= 1972 Individual Speedway World Championship =

Motorcycle speedway world championship season

Seasons
- ← 1971 1973 →

The 1972 Individual Speedway World Championship was the 27th edition of the official World Championship to determine the world champion rider.

The 1972 final attendance at Wembley Stadium was 75,000. New Zealander Ivan Mauger joined Barry Briggs on four title wins (2nd only behind Ove Fundin) by defeating Bernt Persson in a run-off after both riders finished on 13 points.

In heat five, Briggs was involved in an accident which all but ended his speedway career. Going into the first turn his front wheel was hit by Bernt Persson's bike which caused him to fall. He was then hit by the Russian riders Grigory Khlinovsky and Valery Gordeev. Briggs suffered a severe hand injury and lost the index finger on his left hand which caused him to temporarily retire from racing. Briggs had been considered one of the pre-meeting favourites and his favouritism had been firmed when he had beaten fellow New Zealander Ivan Mauger in heat 2.

To the boos of the 75,000 strong Wembley crowd, FIM referee Georg Traunspurger did not exclude Persson. Defending champion Ole Olsen was unlucky not to retain his title because in his first ride (heat 4) while challenging Swede Christer Löfqvist he fell and would score no points. He won his next four rides to finish in a clear third place.

Before the final, the Russian riders had three of their bikes stolen and had to borrow equipment to compete.

== First round ==
Qualification results.

=== Continental qualifying ===
- Riders progress to Continental quarter-finals

Date	Venue	Winner	2nd	3rd
7 May	(Socialist Federal Republic of Yugoslavia) Kovinar Stadium, Maribor	(Czechoslovakia) Petr Ondrašík	(Czechoslovakia) Jan Verner	(Hungary) Sandor Csato
11 May	(Italy) Stadio Moretti, Udine	(Socialist Federal Republic of Yugoslavia) Draško Oreško	(Austria) Gunther Walla	(Bulgaria) Nedialko Nedialkov

== Second round ==
=== Norwegian qualifying ===
- 19 September 1971
- (Norway) Sandnes Idrettspark, Sandnes
- Top 9 (+3 seeded) to Nordic qualification 1972

Pos.	Rider	Points
1	Reidar Eide	15
2	Dag Lovaas	13
3	Svein Kaasa	12
4	Tormod Langli	11
5	Odd Fossengen	11
6	Jan Terje Gravningen	10
7	Dagfinn Dahl	9
8	Edgar Stangeland	8
9	Oyvind S. Berg	7
10	Johnny Larsen	6
11	Nils Otto Haraldsen	5
12	Kjell Thomas Skjëveland	4
13	Eidar Egedius	4
14	Helge Langli	3
15	Ole Fjötland	

=== Finnish qualifying (top 9) ===
- (Finland) (3 rounds) First (+2 seeded riders) to Nordic qualification 1972
- R1 (9 Aug '71, Eteläpuisto, Tampere)
- R2 (28 Aug '71, Kärpänen Speedway, Lahti)
- R3 (12 Sep '71 Eteläpuisto, Tampere)

Pos.	Rider	Points	Points
1	Matti Olin	8+6+8	16
2	Kalevi Lahtinen	4+8+0	12
3	Hannu Känkänen	3+4+6	10
4	Reima Lohkovuori	6+2+3	9
5	Heikki Ahonen	0+3+4	7
6	Kari Vuoristo	2+1+0	3
7	Matti Touru	0+0+2	2
8	Ari Hiljanen	1+0+0	1
9	Rauli Mäkinen	0+0+1	1

=== British/Commonwealth preliminaries ===
- Top riders to British/Commonwealth qualifiers

Date	Venue	Winner	2nd	3rd
15 April	Kingsmead Stadium, Canterbury	Bob Young	Malcolm Ballard	Brian Foote
16 April	Rye House Stadium, Hoddesdon	Dave Kennett	Bob Humphreys	Barry Crowson
21 April	East of England Arena, Peterborough	Geoff Maloney	Phil Crump	Kevin Holden
27 April	Holker Street, Barrow-in-Furness	John Harrhy	Alan Wilkinson	Malcolm Shakespeare
28 April	Derwent Park, Workington	Alan Knapkin	George Major	Russ Dent

=== Continental quarter-finals ===
- Top 16 to Continental semi-finals

Date	Venue	Winner	2nd	3rd
21 May	(Hungary) Borsod Volán Stadion, Miskolc	(Hungary) Janosh Szőke	(Soviet Union) Oleg Dzyadyk	(Soviet Union) Aleksandr Pavlov
21 May	(Czechoslovakia) Pavlovický Stadion, Liberec	(Soviet Union) Viktor Trofimov	(Soviet Union) Yury Dubinin	(Poland) Jan Mucha
21 May	(West Germany) Abensberger Stadion, Abensberg	(Poland) Henryk Glucklich	(Czechoslovakia) Jan Holub I	(Soviet Union) Grigory Khlinovsky
21 May	(Poland) Stadion żużlowy, Gorzów Wielkopolski	(Poland) Edward Jancarz	(Poland) Zenon Plech	(Soviet Union) Valery Gordeev

=== Swedish qualification ===
- Top 6 in each heat to Nordic qualification

(27 April, Gubbängens IP Stockholm)
Pos	Rider	Points
1	Anders Michanek	14
2	Karl-Erik Claesson	13
3	Hasse Holmqvist	13
4	Lars-Inge Hultberg	12
5	Bo Wirebrand	10
6	Göte Nordin	9
7	Åke Dovhed	9
8	Dirk van der Voet	7
9	Tommy Nilsson	6
10	Jan-Inge Karlsson	5
11	Bertil Andersson	5
12	Åke Andersson	5
13	Sune Eriksson	5
14	Harald Sandberg	3
15	Sune Stark	3
16	Bengt Brannefors	0
17	Kjell Marrsson (res)	0

(30 April, Målilla (Motorbana) Målilla)
Pos	Rider	Points
1	Jan Simensen	12
2	Tommy Johansson	12
3	Per-Olof Söderman	11
4	Torbjörn Harrysson	11
5	Christer Sjösten	10
6	Stephan Johansson	9
7	Anders Jansson	9
8	Roy Dantanus	9
9	Berndt Johansson	7
10	Willy Karlsson	7
11	Bengt Olsson	7
12	Floyd Ohlsson	5
13	Lars-Olov Karlsson	4
14	Anders Lövgren	4
15	Claes-Ingvar Svensson	2
16	Curt Nyqvist	0
17	Kalle Lindgren (res)	0

(1 May, Motorbanen Hagalund Lindesberg)
Pos	Rider	Points
1	Bernt Persson	15
2	Sören Sjösten	14
3	Lars Jansson	13
4	Bengt Larsson	12
5	Hans Johansson	11
6	Tommy Wedén	9
7	Stefan Salmonsson	9
8	Casimir Nilsson	8
9	Sigvard Johansson	6
10	Therje Henriksson	6
11	Lars Jennefors	5
12	Lars-Åke Andersson	4
13	Sören Karlsson	4
14	Inge Gustavsson	4
15	Hans Engzell	1
16	Leif Söderberg	0

(1 May, Gamla Galgberget Visby)
Pos	Rider	Points
1	Christer Löfqvist	15
2	Tommy Jansson	13
3	Leif Enecrona	13
4	Rolf Johansson	12
5	Bengt Jansson	12
6	Claes Löfstrand	8
7	Ragnar Holm	8
8	Bo Magnusson	7
9	Käll Haage	7
10	Håkan Karlsson	6
11	Torbjörn Karlsson	4
12	Kenneth Selmosson	4
13	Kurt Sigurdh	3
14	Börje Klingberg	3
15	Reine Södergren	1
16	Ove Helander	0

== Third round ==
=== British/Commonwealth qualifiers ===
- Top 32 to British/Commonwealth semi-finals

Date	Venue	Winner	2nd	3rd
20 May	The Shay, Halifax	Eric Boocock	Bob Kilby	Ray Wilson
20 May	King's Lynn Stadium, King's Lynn	Terry Betts	Malcolm Simmons	Howard Cole
20 May	Hyde Road, Manchester	Ivan Mauger	Chris Pusey	Jim McMillan
22 May	Reading Stadium, Reading	Ronnie Moore	Dave Jessup	Mick Bell
22 May	County Ground Stadium, Exeter	Howard Cole	Bob Kilby	Barry Briggs
25 May	Oxford Stadium, Oxford	Terry Betts	Garry Middleton	Malcolm Simmons
25 May	Owlerton Stadium, Sheffield	Arnie Haley	Ivan Mauger	Bobby Beaton
25 May	Wimbledon Stadium, London	Ronnie Moore	Bob Andrews	Barry Briggs
25 May	Foxhall Stadium, Ipswich	David Kennett	John Harrhy	George Hunter
26 May	Hackney Wick Stadium, London	Geoff Curtis	Barry Thomas	Chris Pusey
26 May	Monmore Green, Wolverhampton	Dave Gifford	Peter Collins	Norman Hunter
27 May	Abbey Stadium, Swindon	Barry Briggs	Martin Ashby	Phil Crump
27 May	Dudley Wood Stadium, Dudley	Bob Andrews	Arnie Haley	Bob Kilby
27 May	Brandon Stadium, Coventry	Nigel Boocock	Tony Lomas	John Louis
30 May	Wimborne Road, Poole	Nigel Boocock	Geoff Curtis	Howard Cole
2 June	Hampden Park, Glasgow	Bobby Beaton	Jim McMillan	John Louis
2 June	Somerton Park, Newport	Bruce Cribb	Tony Clarke	Mike Broadbanks
6 June	Leicester Stadium, Leicester	Dave Jessup	Ivan Mauger	Malcolm Shakespeare

=== Nordic qualifying ===
- Top 5 in each heat to Nordic final

(11 May, Gislaved Motorbana, Gislaved)
Pos	Rider	Points
1	(Sweden) Bernt Persson	15
2	(Sweden) Tommy Jansson	13
3	(Sweden) Torbjörn Harrysson	12
4	(Sweden) Leif Enecrona	12
5	(Sweden) Christer Löfqvist	11
6	(Sweden) Jan Simensen	10
7	(Norway) Odd Fossengen	9
8	(Sweden) Karl-Erik Claesson	8
9	(Norway) Svein Kaasa	7
10	(Denmark) Jörn Mogensen	6
11	(Sweden) Claes Löfstrand	5
12	(Norway) Tormod Langli	4
13	(Finland) Kari Vuoristo	3
14	(Denmark) Preben Bollerup	3
15	(Denmark) Kurt Bögh	2
16	(Norway) Hans Erik Fuglerud	0

(11 May, Avestavallen, Avesta
Pos	Rider	Points
1	(Sweden) Hasse Holmqvist	15
2	(Sweden) Sören Sjösten	12
3	(Sweden) Tommy Johansson	12
4	(Sweden) Göte Nordin	12
5	(Norway) Dag Lövaas	12
6	(Sweden) Bengt Larsson	10
7	(Sweden) Lars Jansson	8
8	(Norway) Edgar Stangeland	7
9	(Denmark) Henning Hansen	6
10	(Denmark) Fred Hansen	6
11	(Denmark) Erik Tillgaard	6
12	(Sweden) Bo Wirebrand	5
13	(Finland) Hannu Känkänen	5
14	(Sweden) Lars-Inge Hultberg	2
15	(Norway) Niels Heraldsen	1
16	(Norway) Knud Heia	0

(12 May, Gamla Ryd Motorstadion, Linköping)
Pos	Rider	Points
1	(Sweden) Anders Michanek	15
2	(Norway) Reidar Eide	14
3	(Sweden) Bengt Jansson	13
4	(Sweden) Per-Olof Söderman	11
5	(Norway) Öyvind Berg	11
6	(Sweden) Christer Sjösten	10
7	(Denmark) Bent Nörregaard-Jensen	10
8	(Sweden) Hans Johansso	7
9	(Denmark) Krause Kjaer	6
10	(Sweden) Ragnar Holm	6
11	(Sweden) Tommy Wedén	6
12	(Denmark) Nils Schelde	4
13	(Sweden) Stephan Johansson	3
14	(Norway) Dagfinn Dahl	3
15	(Norway) Kjell Skievelan	1
16	(Finland) Matti Olin	0

=== Continental semi-finals ===
- 3 June
- (Czechoslovakia) Markéta Stadium, Prague
- Top 8 to Continental final

Pos.	Rider	Points
1	(Poland) Edward Jancarz	15
2	(Czechoslovakia) Milan Špinka	11
3	(Poland) Zenon Plech	10
4	(Soviet Union) Anatolij Kuzmin	10
5	(Soviet Union) Viktor Trofimov	9
6	(Czechoslovakia) Petr Ondrašík	9
7	(Soviet Union) Vladimir Baturin	8
8	(Soviet Union) Valerij Gordeev	8
9	(Soviet Union) Anatolij Mironov	8
10	(Soviet Union) Yury Dubinin	8
11	(Czechoslovakia) Václav Verner (res)	8
12	(Poland) Ryszard Dziatkowiak	7
13	(Poland) Antoni Woryna	4
14	(Soviet Union) Gennadij Ivanov	3
15	(Poland) Jan Mucha	2
16	(Czechoslovakia) Stanislav Kubíček	0
17	(Poland) Zdzislaw Dobrucki	0
18	(Czechoslovakia) Zdenek Novotny (res)	0

- 4 June
- (Poland) Polonia Bydgoszcz Stadium, Bydgoszcz
- Top 8 to Continental final

Pos.	Rider	Points
1	(Poland) Marek Cieslak	15
2	(Poland) Paweł Waloszek	13
3	(Poland) Henryk Glücklich	11
4	(Soviet Union) Viktor Kalmykov	11
5	(Poland) Zbigniew Friedek	11
6	(Soviet Union) Grigory Khlinovsky	10
7	(Soviet Union) Vladimir Paznikov	8
8	(Poland) Jerzy Szczakiel	8
9	(Poland) Andrzej Koselski (res)	8
10	(Soviet Union) Alexander Pavlov	6
11	(Soviet Union) Oleg Dziadyk	6
12	(Czechoslovakia) Jan Verner	6
13	(Czechoslovakia) Miroslav Verner	3
14	(Hungary) Janos Szöke	2
15	(Czechoslovakia) Jan Holub I	1
16	(Poland) Benedykt Kosek (res)	1
17	(Hungary) Istvan Sziraczky	0

== Fourth round ==
=== British/Commonwealth semi-finals ===
- 20 June
- (England) Leicester Stadium, Leicester
- Top 8 to British/Commonwealth final

Pos.	Rider	Points
1	(England) Terry Betts	14+3
2	(New Zealand) Ronnie Moore	14+2
3	(England) Arnie Haley	13
4	(Australia) Garry Middleton	12
5	(New Zealand) Barry Briggs	11
6	(England) John Louis	8
7	(England) Trevor Hedge	8
8	(Scotland) George Hunter (res)	8
9	(England) Nigel Boocock	6
10	(Australia) Geoff Curtis	6
11	(England) Chris Pusey	6
12	(Australia) Phil Crump	4
13	(England) Dave Younghusband	4
14	(Scotland) Bobby Beaton	2
15	(England) Pete Smith	2
16	(England) Tony Clarke	1
17	(Wales) Howard Cole	0

- 22 June
- (England) Owlerton Stadium, Sheffield
- Top 8 to British/Commonwealth final

Pos.	Rider	Points
1	(New Zealand) Ivan Mauger	15
2	(Scotland) Jim McMillan	13
3	(Australia) John Boulger	12
4	(England) Martin Ashby	10
5	(England) Ray Wilson	10
6	(England) Eric Boocock	10
7	(England) Dave Jessup	9
8	(England) Peter Collins	9
9	(England) Norman Hunter	9
10	(England) Tony Lomas	4
11	(England) Bob Kilby	4
12	(England) John Harrhy	4
13	(England) Bob Andrews	4
14	(England) Barry Thomas	3
15	(England) Mick Bell	2
16	(England) Mike Broadbank	2

=== Nordic Final ===
- 1 June 1972
- (Sweden) Norrköping Motorstadion
- First 8 to European Final plus 1 reserve

Pos.	Rider	Heat Scores	Total
1	(Sweden) Bengt Jansson	3,2,3,3,3	14
2	(Sweden) Anders Michanek	3,3,3,1,3	13
3	(Denmark) Ole Olsen	3,2,2,3,2	12
4	(Sweden) Bernt Persson	1,2,3,2,3	11
5	(Sweden) Hasse Holmqvist	2,3,2,2,2	11
6	(Sweden) Christer Löfqvist	3,3,3,0,1	10
7	(Sweden) Jan Simensen	2,0,2,3,3	10
8	(Norway) Reidar Eide	1,3,1,2,2	9
9	(Sweden) Tommy Jansson	2,1,2,3,E	8
10	(Norway) Dag Lovaas	1,1,1,2,0	5
11	(Sweden) Tommy Johansson	0,1,0,1,2	4
12	(Norway) Øyvind S. Berg	1,0,0,1,1	3
13	(Sweden) Göte Nordin	0,2,1,0,-	3
14	(Sweden) Leif Enecrona	0,0,1,1,1	3
15	(Sweden) Per Olof Söderman	2,0,0,0,0	2
16	(Sweden) Sören Sjösten	0,1,0,0,-	1
R1	(Sweden) Christer Sjösten	E	0
R2	(Sweden) Runo Wedin	0	0

=== Continental Final ===
- 25 June 1972
- (Soviet Union) Dombay Motodrom, Cherkessk
- First 8 to European Final plus 1 reserve

Pos.	Rider	Heat Scores	Total
1	(Soviet Union) Viktor Trofimov	2,3,3,3,3	14
2	(Soviet Union) Viktor Kalmykov	3,3,3,2,2	13
3	(Soviet Union) Anatoly Kuzmin	2,2,2,3,3	12
4	(Soviet Union) Valery Gordeev	3,1,1,3,3	11
5	(Czechoslovakia) Milan Špinka	1,3,3,2,1	10
6	(Soviet Union) Grigory Khlinovsky	3,2,F,1,3	9
7	(Poland) Paweł Waloszek	0,3,2,2,2	9
8	(Soviet Union) Aleksandr Pavlov	2,2,2,1,2	9
9	(Poland) Zenon Plech	F,2,2,3,F	7
10	(Soviet Union) Anatoly Mironov	1,1,1,2,1	6
11	(Poland) Zygfryd Friedek	X,1,1,1,2	5
12	(Czechoslovakia) Petr Ondrašík	3,X,0,0,1	4
13	(Soviet Union) Vasily Baturin	F,X,3,X,0	3
14	(Poland) Marek Cieślak	0,1,1,1,0	3
15	(Poland) Henryk Glucklich	2,E,X,0,X	2
16	(Poland) Edward Jancarz	1,X,E,E,1	2
R1	(Soviet Union) Gennady Kurilenko	1,0,0,X	1
R2	(Soviet Union) Vladimir Kubanov	0,0,0	0

== Fifth round ==
=== British/Commonwealth Final ===
- 2 August 1972
- (England) Brandon Stadium, Coventry
- First 5 to World Final

Placing	Rider	Total	1	2	3	4	5	6	7	8	9	10	11	12	13	14	15	16	17	18	19	20	Pts	Pos	21
1	(New Zealand) (6) Ivan Mauger	14		3				3			3							2			3		14	1	
2	(England) (12) Nigel Boocock	12			3					2		2			3						2		12	2	
3	(New Zealand) (4) Barry Briggs	11	1							3				3				1				3	11	3	3
4	(England) (8) John Louis	11		2						1			3			3			2				11	4	E
5	(England) (9) Eric Boocock	10			2		2						1					3		2			10	5	3
6	(Scotland) (2) Jim McMillan	10	3					1				3				0				3			10	6	2
7	(England) (15) Terry Betts	9				3			2			1						0	3				9	7	
8	(England) (10) Ray Wilson	7			T			2						1			3		1				7	8	
9	(England) (11) Dave Jessup	7			1				3		T					2						1	7	9	
10	(Australia) (13) John Boulger	7				0	3							2		1					1		7	10	
11	(England) (3) Martin Ashby	6	2						1				2				1				0		6	11	
12	(England) (16) Arnold Haley	5				1				0	1						2			1			5	12	
13	(Australia) (5) Garry Middleton	4		1			1					0					0					2	4	13	
14	(England) (1) Peter Collins	3	0				E				2				1				0				3	14	
15	(England) (7) Trevor Hedge	2		0					E					0	2					0			2	15	
16	(New Zealand) (14) Ronnie Moore	2				2		E					0		0							0	2	16	
R1	(England) (R1) Pete Bailey	0			0																		0	R1	
R2	(England) (R2) Norman Hunter	0									F												0	R2	
Placing	Rider	Total	1	2	3	4	5	6	7	8	9	10	11	12	13	14	15	16	17	18	19	20	Pts	Pos	21

m - exclusion for exceeding two minute time allowance • t - exclusion for touching the tapes • x - other exclusion • e - retired or mechanical failure • f - fell • ns - non-starter • nc - non-classify

gate A - inside	gate B	gate C	gate D - outside

=== European Final ===
- 3 September 1972
- (Poland) Olympic Stadium, Wrocław
- First 11 to World Final plus 1 reserve

Placing	Rider	Total	1	2	3	4	5	6	7	8	9	10	11	12	13	14	15	16	17	18	19	20	Pts	Pos	21
1	(Poland) (12) Paweł Waloszek	13			3					1		3			3						3		13	1	
2	(Denmark) (8) Ole Olsen	11		3						3			2			1			2				11	2	
3	(Sweden) (13) Anders Michanek	11				3	3							1		3					1		11	3	
4	(Soviet Union) (16) Aleksandr Pavlov	10				1				0	3						3			3			10	4	
5	(Soviet Union) (4) Anatoly Kuzmin	10	2							2				3				3				0	10	5	
6	(Soviet Union) (3) Grigory Khlinovsky	9	3						3				3				0				0		9	6	
7	(Sweden) (10) Christer Löfqvist	8			2			1						2			2		1				8	7	
8	(Soviet Union) (11) Viktor Trofimov	8			1				2		2					2						1	8	8	
9	(Sweden) (2) Bernt Persson	7	1					3				1				0				2			7	9	
10	(Soviet Union) (6) Valery Gordeev	7		2				2			E							1			2		7	10	
11	(Soviet Union) (14) Viktor Kalmykov	7				2		F					1		2							2	7	11	
12	(Sweden) (5) Jan Simensen	6		F			2					0					1					3	6	12	
13	(Czechoslovakia) (15) Milan Špinka	5				0			1			2						0	2				5	13	
14	(Sweden) (9) Bengt Jansson	3			0		E						0					2		1			3	14	
15	(Sweden) (1) Hasse Holmqvist	2	F				E				1				1				0				2	15	
16	(Norway) (7) Reidar Eide	0		E					0					0	0					0			0	16	
R1	(Sweden) (R1) Tommy Jansson	0																					0	R1	
R2	(Poland) (R2) Zenon Plech	0																					0	R2	
Placing	Rider	Total	1	2	3	4	5	6	7	8	9	10	11	12	13	14	15	16	17	18	19	20	Pts	Pos	21

m - exclusion for exceeding two minute time allowance • t - exclusion for touching the tapes • x - other exclusion • e - retired or mechanical failure • f - fell • ns - non-starter • nc - non-classify

gate A - inside	gate B	gate C	gate D - outside

== World Final ==
- 16 September 1972
- (England) Wembley Stadium, London
- Referee: (West Germany) Georg Traunspurger

Placing	Rider	Total	1	2	3	4	5	6	7	8	9	10	11	12	13	14	15	16	17	18	19	20	Pts	Pos	21
1	(New Zealand) (6) Ivan Mauger	13		2				3			2							3			3		13	1	3
2	(Sweden) (13) Bernt Persson	13				2	3							3		3					2		13	2	2
3	(Denmark) (16) Ole Olsen	12				F				3	3						3			3			12	3	
4	(Sweden) (15) Christer Löfqvist	11				3			2			3						0	3				11	4	
5	(England) (14) John Louis	11				1		2					3		2							3	11	5	
6	(Soviet Union) (7) Aleksandr Pavlov	8		1					3					0	3					1			8	6	
7	(Sweden) (4) Anders Michanek	8	X							2				2				2				2	8	7	
8	(Poland) (3) Paweł Waloszek	6	3						1				0				1				1		6	8	
9	(Soviet Union) (8) Viktor Trofimov	6		0						0			2			2			2				6	9	
10	(England) (12) Nigel Boocock	6			2					1		2			1						0		6	10	
11	(Soviet Union) (10) Viktor Kalmykov	6			1			1						1			2		1				6	11	
12	(Soviet Union) (11) Anatoly Kuzmin	4			3				0		0					1						0	4	12	
13	(Soviet Union) (1) Grigory Khlinovsky	4	2				1				1				0				0				4	13	
14	(New Zealand) (5) Barry Briggs	3		3			F					-					-					-	3	14	
15	(England) (2) Eric Boocock	2	X					0				0				0				2			2	15	
16	(Soviet Union) (9) Valery Gordeev	2			0		0						1					1		0			2	16	
R1	(Sweden) (R1) Jan Simensen	2					2										0						2	R1	
R2	(Scotland) (R2) Jim McMillan	2										1										1	2	R2	
Placing	Rider	Total	1	2	3	4	5	6	7	8	9	10	11	12	13	14	15	16	17	18	19	20	Pts	Pos	21

m - exclusion for exceeding two minute time allowance • t - exclusion for touching the tapes • x - other exclusion • e - retired or mechanical failure • f - fell • ns - non-starter • nc - non-classify

gate A - inside	gate B	gate C	gate D - outside
