= 1976 Speedway World Team Cup =

17th edition of the annual motorcycle speedway World Cup competition

Seasons
- ← 1975 1977 →

The 1976 Speedway World Team Cup was the 17th edition of the FIM Speedway World Team Cup to determine the team world champions.

The final took place at the White City Stadium in London. Australia became only the fourth country to win the title. They ended the run of England by knocking them out in the British qualifying round.

== Qualification ==
=== British (& Commonwealth) Round ===
- 16 May
- (England) Foxhall Stadium, Ipswich
- Referee: (Sweden) R. Randborg

Placing	Team / Rider name	Total	1	2	3	4	5	6	7	8	9	10	11	12	13	14	15	16	Pts	17	18	19	20
1	Australia	40	3	6	9	11	13	16	19	21	23	26	28	31	34	36	38	40		40	40	40	40
1	(1) John Boulger	9				2				2				3				2	9
1	(2) Phil Crump	10			3				3				2				2		10
1	(3) Billy Sanders	12		3				3				3			3				12
1	(4) Phil Herne	9	3				2				2					2			9
1	(17) Bob Humphreys	0																	0
2	England	35	2	4	4	7	10	12	14	17	20	22	22	24	26	29	32	35		35	35	35	35
2	(9) John Louis	8			F		3					2						3	8
2	(10) Peter Collins	11				3		2			3						3		11
2	(11) Dave Jessup	8		2						3			F			3			8
2	(12) Malcolm Simmons	8	2						2					2	2				8
2	(19) Martin Ashby	0																	0
3	Scotland	12	0	1	2	3	4	4	5	5	6	7	10	10	10	11	12	12		12	12	12	12
3	(13) Jim McMillan	3		1					1		1							0	3
3	(14) Bobby Beaton	2	0							0		1					1		2
3	(15) George Hunter	0			F			-						-		-			0
3	(16) Brian Collins	5				1	1						3		F				5
3	(20) Willie Templeton	2			1			0						0		1			2
4	New Zealand	8	1	1	3	3	3	4	4	5	5	5	6	7	7	7	7	8		8	8	8	8
4	(5) Bruce Cribb	4	1					1					1					1	4
4	(6) Larry Ross	1		0			0							1			0		1
4	(7) Dave Gifford	0				0			0			0				0			0
4	(8) Colin Farquharson	3			2					1	F				F				3
4	(18) Jack Millen	0																	0
Placing	Team / Rider name	Total	1	2	3	4	5	6	7	8	9	10	11	12	13	14	15	16	Pts	17	18	19	20

M - exclusion for exceeding two-minute time allowance • T - exclusion for touching the tapes • X - other exclusion • E - retired or mechanical failure • F - fell

Helmet colours were permanent for each team (Red, Blue, White and Yellow/Black). Colours in diagrams indicate gate positions:
gate A – inside	gate B	gate C	gate D – outside

- Australia to Final

=== Scandinavian Round ===
- 30 May
- (Finland) Eteläpuisto, Tampere

1st	2nd	3rd	4th
Sweden - 41; Bengt Jansson - 12; Anders Michanek - 12; Bernt Persson - 12; Tommy Nilsson - 5 Sören Karlsson - 0	Norway - 27; Dag Lovaas - 8 Reidar Eide - 7 Edgar Stangeland- 7 Audun Ove Olsen - 4 Øyvind S. Berg - 1	Denmark - 14; Finn Thomsen - 6 Mike Lohmann - 5 Leif Berlin - 1 Alf Busk - 1 Finn Rune Jensen - 1	Finland - 14; Ila Teromaa - 7 Kai Niemi - 4 Veli-Pekka Teromaa - 2 Markku Helminen - 1 Ari Koponen - 0

- Sweden to Final

=== Continental Round ===
Quarterfinal

- 13 July
- (Italy) Castiglione Olona Speedway, Varese

1st	2nd	3rd	4th
West Germany - 34; Hans Wassermann - 12; Alois Wiesböck - 9 Christoph Betzl - 7 Georg Gilgenreiner - 6	Italy - 32; Paolo Noro - 11; Giuseppe Marzotto - 8 Luigi Bazan- 7 Mauro Ferraccioli - 5 Sandro Pastorelli - 1	Netherlands - 19; Henny Kroeze - 7 Henk Steman - 7 Frits Koning - 4 Tonny Egges - 1 Frits Koppe - 0	Austria - 10; Hubert Fischbacher - 4 Josef Haider - 4 Peter Sattler - 1 Manfred Trisko - 1 Alex Taudtmann - 0

- West Germany and Italy to Continental Semifinal

Quarterfinal

- 13 July
- (Socialist Federal Republic of Yugoslavia) Matija Gubec Stadium, Krško

1st	2nd	3rd	4th
Czechoslovakia - 42; Josef Minarik - 12; Jan Hadek - 9 Jan Klokocka - 8 Petr Kucera - 8 Vaclav Hejl - 5	Hungary - 25+3; Istvan Sziraczki - 10; Laszlo Zahoran - 6 Pal Perenyi- 5 Janos Szöeke - 4 Janos Jakab - 0	Bulgaria - 25+2; Nikolai Manev - 8 Angel Eftimov - 7 Orlin Janakiev - 7 Ivan Dupalov - 3 Christo Simeonov - 0	Yugoslavia - 2 Franc Sauperl - 2 Stefan Kekec - 0 Krešo Omerzel - 0 Joze Mausar - 0 Franc Pribovsek - 0

- Czechoslovakia and Hungary to Continental Semifinal

Semifinal

- 26 June
- (West Germany) Ellermühle Stadium, Landshut

1st	2nd	3rd	4th
West Germany - 44; Egon Müller - 12; Christoph Betzl - 11; Hans Wassermann - 11; Alois Wiesböck - 10; Georg Gilgenreiner - 0	Czechoslovakia - 33; Jiří Štancl - 11; Josef Minarik - 8 Jan Hadek- 6 Jan Klokocka - 5 Petr Ondrašík - 3	Italy - 13; Giuseppe Marzotto - 7 Luigi Bazan - 3 Paolo Noro - 2 Mauro Ferraccioli - 1 Francesco Barbetta - 0	Hungary - 6 Istvan Sziraczky - 3 Pal Perenyi - 2 Laszlo Zahoran - 1 Janos Jakab - 0 Janos Szöeke - 0

- West Germany and Czechoslovakia to Continental Final

Continental Final

- 3 July
- (Czechoslovakia) Slaný Speedway Stadium, Slaný

Placing	Team / Rider name	Total	1	2	3	4	5	6	7	8	9	10	11	12	13	14	15	16	Pts	17	18	19	20
1	Poland	30	3	5	8	9	10	13	15	17	18	19	20	23	25	26	28	30		30	30	30	30
1	(13) Edward Jancarz	7		2					2		1							2	7
1	(14) Zenon Plech	8	3							2		1					2		8
1	(15) Jerzy Rembas	10			3			3						3		1			10
1	(16) Marek Cieślak	2				1	-						1		-				2
1	(20) Jan Mucha	3					1								2				3
2	Soviet Union	28	3	4	5	7	10	11	13	14	14	17	18	21	24	24	27	28		28	28	28	28
2	(1) Vladimir Gordeev	7				2				1				3				1	7
2	(2) Valery Gordeev	7			1				2				1				3		7
2	(3) Grigory Khlinovsky	8		1				1				3			3				8
2	(4) Viktor Trofimov	6	3				3				F					-			6
2	(17) Mikhail Starostin	0														0			0
3	Czechoslovakia	24	2	4	4	5	6	6	9	9	12	14	16	18	18	21	21	24		24	24	24	24
3	(13) Jiří Štancl	11		2					3		3							3	11
3	(14) Jan Hadek	2	2							0		-					0		2
3	(15) Josef Minarik	3			0			0						-		3			3
3	(16) Jan Klokocka	4				1	1						2		-				4
3	(20) Václav Verner	4										2		2	0				4
4	West Germany	14	0	0	3	3	3	6	6	8	10	10	10	10	11	13	14	14		14	14	14	14
4	(5) Egon Müller	3	0					3					0					E	3
4	(6) Alois Wiesböck	1		0			0							-			1		1
4	(7) Christoph Betzl	2				0			0			-				2			2
4	(8) Hans Wassermann	8			3					2	2				1				8
4	(18) Georg Gilgenreiner	0										0		0					0
Placing	Team / Rider name	Total	1	2	3	4	5	6	7	8	9	10	11	12	13	14	15	16	Pts	17	18	19	20

M - exclusion for exceeding two-minute time allowance • T - exclusion for touching the tapes • X - other exclusion • E - retired or mechanical failure • F - fell

Helmet colours were permanent for each team (Red, Blue, White and Yellow/Black). Colours in diagrams indicate gate positions:
gate A – inside	gate B	gate C	gate D – outside

- Poland and Soviet Union to Final

== World Final ==
- 19 September
- (England) White City Stadium, London
- Att: 9,000
- Referee: (West Germany) Gunther Sober

Placing	Team / Rider name	Total	1	2	3	4	5	6	7	8	9	10	11	12	13	14	15	16	Pts	17	18	19	20
1	Australia	31	2	4	7	10	10	13	13	15	17	17	19	21	24	25	28	31		31	31	31	31
1	(9) John Boulger	6			3		F					0						3	6
1	(10) Phil Crump	11				3		3			2						3		11
1	(11) Billy Sanders	7		2						2			2			1			7
1	(12) Phil Herne	7	2						0					2	3				7
1	(19) Garry Middleton	0																	0
2	Poland	28	3	4	4	5	8	10	11	14	15	18	21	21	22	25	27	28		28	28	28	28
2	(5) Edward Jancarz	9	3					2					3					1	9
2	(6) Zenon Plech	6		1			3							F			2		6
2	(7) Marek Cieślak	7				1			-			3				3			7
2	(8) Jerzy Rembas	5			0					3	1				1				5
2	(18) Bolesław Proch	1							1										1
3	Sweden	26	1	4	6	8	9	10	13	13	16	17	17	20	22	24	24	26		26	26	26	26
3	(13) Anders Michanek	11		3					3		3							2	11
3	(14) Bengt Jansson	1	1							F		-					-		1
3	(15) Bernt Persson	8			2			1						3		2			8
3	(16) Lars-Åke Andersson	5				2	1						E		2				5
3	(20) Christer Löfqvist	1										1					E		1
4	Soviet Union	11	0	0	1	1	3	3	5	6	6	8	9	10	10	10	11	11		11	11	11	11
4	(1) Viktor Trofimov	0				0				-				-				-	0
4	(2) Valery Gordeev	5			1				2				1				1		5
4	(3) Grigory Khlinovsky	2		0				0				2			0				2
4	(4) Vladimir Gordeev	2	0				2				0					0			2
4	(17) Vladimir Paznikov	2								1				1				0	2
Placing	Team / Rider name	Total	1	2	3	4	5	6	7	8	9	10	11	12	13	14	15	16	Pts	17	18	19	20

M - exclusion for exceeding two-minute time allowance • T - exclusion for touching the tapes • X - other exclusion • E - retired or mechanical failure • F - fell

Helmet colours were permanent for each team (Red, Blue, White and Yellow/Black). Colours in diagrams indicate gate positions:
gate A – inside	gate B	gate C	gate D – outside

== See also ==
- 1976 Individual Speedway World Championship
- 1976 Speedway World Pairs Championship
