= Zenon Plech =

Polish speedway rider (1953–2020)

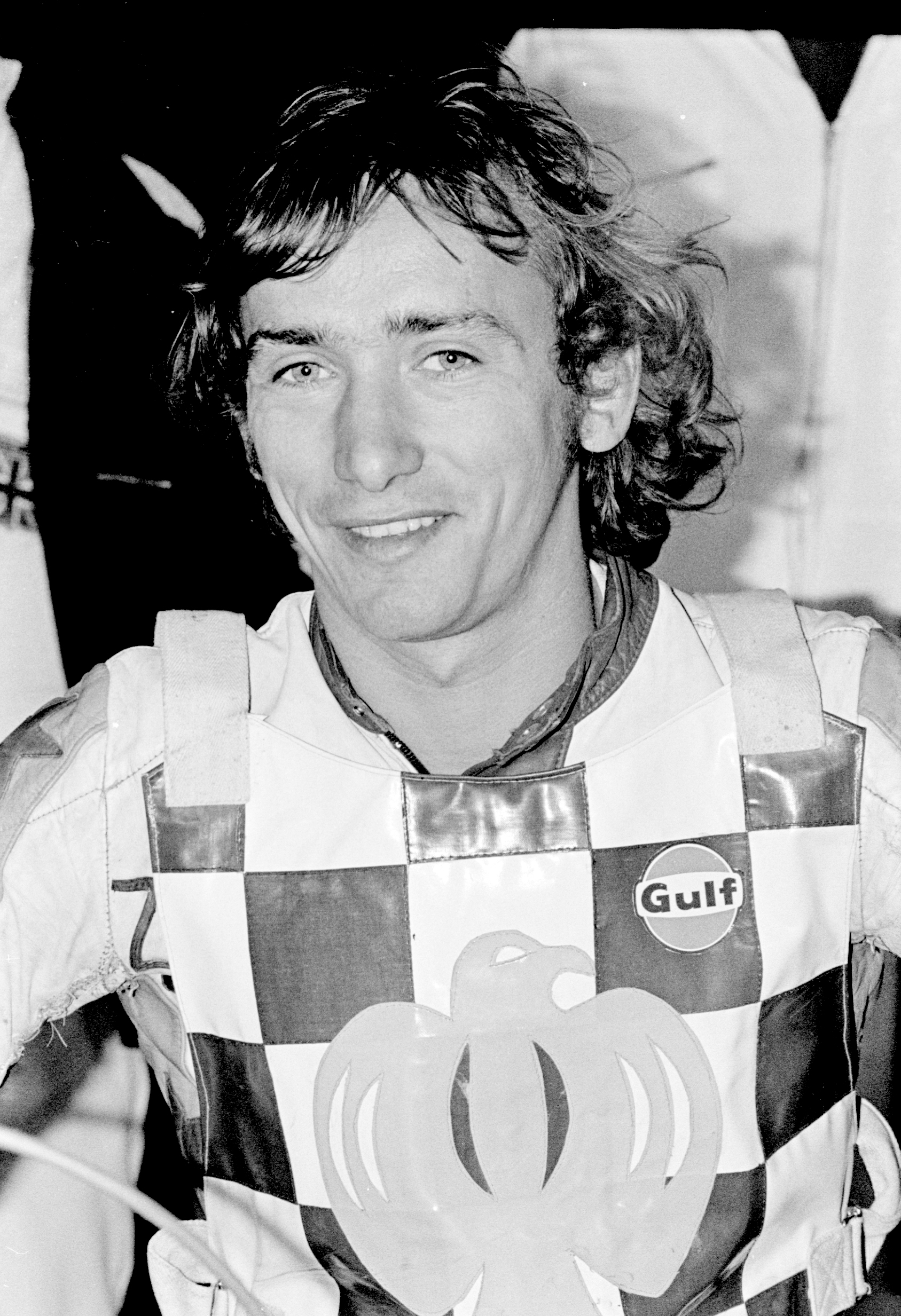
- Born: 1 January 1953; Zwierzyn, Poland
- Died: 25 November 2020 (aged 67); Gdańsk, Poland
- Nationality: Polish

Career history

Poland
- 1970–1976: Gorzów
- 1977–1987: Gdańsk

Great Britain
- 1975–1976, 1979–1981: Hackney Hawks
- 1982: Sheffield Tigers

Individual honours
- 1972, 1974, 1979, 1984, 1985: Polish Champion
- 1980, 1983: Continental Champion
- 1973, 1974, 1978: Poland Golden Helmet Winner
- 1971: Poland Silver Helmet Winner

Team honours
- 1973, 1975, 1976, 1985: Polish League Champion

Zenon Plech (1 January 1953 – 25 November 2020) was a Polish international motorcycle speedway rider. He finished third in the Speedway World Championship in 1973 and as the runner-up in 1979. He earned 76 international caps for the Poland national speedway team.

== Career ==
Plech won the Polish National Championship five times (1972, 1975, 1979, 1985 and 1986) and runner-up twice (1981 and 1983). He also was a member of the Poland team to take third place in the World Team Cup in 1972 and 1981.

Plech's third place in the 1973 World Final at the Silesian Stadium in Chorzów, Poland was controversial. On the last lap of Heat 19, Soviet rider Grigory Khlinovsky had attempted to pass Plech for the lead going into the back straight. As he was passed by the Russian, Plech lost control of his bike and fell. Despite protests from riders and the Soviet officials, and taking no other eyewitness account into consideration, the referee assigned to the meeting by the FIM simply took Plech's word that Khlynovski had knocked him off his bike. England's Peter Collins was awarded the heat win, Plech was awarded 2nd despite not actually finishing the race, while another Russian, Valery Gordeev, was awarded third place despite also not finishing when he crashed into Plech's fallen bike.

The result of the two points Plech gained for second place allowed Plech to finish a clear third in the championship. The ruling, with Khlynovski excluded, should have seen Collins as the only point scorer as he was the only rider to finish, and Plech scoring no points after failing to finish. This would have resulted in Plech only finishing the championship on ten points and in a fifth place tie with Khlynovski. Had the Russian not been excluded and had been awarded the heat win as many, including World Champions Ivan Mauger and Ole Olsen, believe should have been the case, he would have ended on 13 points. This would have put him in the run-off for the title with winner Jerzy Szczakiel (Poland) and defending champion Mauger.

Plech rode for Hackney Hawks between 1975 and 1981 missing two seasons in 1977 and 1978 after being drafted into the Polish Army although Hackney operated "Zenon Plech (Rider Replacement)" for the entire 1977 season. He then rode briefly for Sheffield Tigers in the British League.

== World Final Appearances ==
=== Individual World Championship ===
- 1973 – (Poland) Chorzów, Silesian Stadium – 3rd – 12pts
- 1974 – (Sweden) Gothenburg, Ullevi – 8th – 8pts
- 1975 – (England) London, Wembley Stadium – 14th – 4pts
- 1976 – (Poland) Chorzów, Silesian Stadium – 5th – 11pts
- 1979 – (Poland) Chorzów, Silesian Stadium – 2nd – 13pts
- 1980 – (Sweden) Gothenburg, Ullevi – 15th – 1pt
- 1981 – (England) London, Wembley Stadium – 15th – 3pts
- 1983 – (West Germany) Norden, Motodrom Halbemond – 15th – 1pt

=== World Pairs Championship ===
- 1973 – (Sweden) Borås, Ryavallen (with Zbigniew Marcinkowski) – 3rd – 21pts (14)
- 1974 – (England) Manchester, Hyde Road (with Edward Jancarz) – 5th – 18pts (12)
- 1976 – (Sweden) Eskilstuna, Eskilstuna Motorstadion (with Edward Jancarz) – 7th – 10pts (3)
- 1979 – (Denmark) Vojens, Vojens Speedway Center (with Edward Jancarz) – 3rd – 20pts (7)
- 1980 – (Socialist Federal Republic of Yugoslavia) Krško, Matija Gubec Stadium (with Edward Jancarz) – 2nd – 22pts (7)
- 1981 – (Poland) Chorzów, Silesian Stadium (with Edward Jancarz) – 3rd – 21pts (15)

=== World Team Cup ===
- 1972 – (West Germany) Olching, Olching Speedwaybahn (with Henryk Glücklich / Paweł Waloszek / Zdzisław Dobrucki / Marek Cieślak) – 3rd – 21pts (7)
- 1973 – (England) London, Wembley Stadium (with Paweł Waloszek / Edward Jancarz / Jerzy Szczakiel / Jan Mucha) – 4th – 8pts (5)
- 1974 – (Poland) Chorzów, Silesian Stadium (with Jan Mucha / Andrzej Jurczyński / Andrzej Tkocz / Jerzy Szczakiel) – 3rd – 13pts (4)
- 1975 – (West Germany) Norden, Motodrom Halbemond (with Henryk Glucklich / Edward Jancarz / Marek Cieślak / Jerzy Rembas) – 4th – 9pts (0)
- 1976 – (England) London, White City Stadium (with Edward Jancarz / Marek Cieślak / Jerzy Rembas / Boleslaw Proch) – 2nd – 28pts (6)
- 1978 – (West Germany) Landshut, Ellermühle Speedway Stadium (with Edward Jancarz / Marek Cieślak / Jerzy Rembas / Andrzej Huszcza) – 3rd – 16+3pts (1)
- 1979 – (England) London, White City Stadium (with Piotr Pyszny / Robert Słaboń / Marek Cieślak / Andrzej Tkocz) – 4th – 11pts (4)
- 1980 – (Poland) Wrocław, Olympic Stadium (with Roman Jankowski / Andrzej Huszcza / Edward Jancarz / Jerzy Rembas) – 3rd – 15pts (5)
- 1984 – (Poland) Leszno (with Roman Jankowski / Zenon Kasprzak / Leonard Raba / Boleslaw Proch) – 4th – 8pts (4)

== After retirement ==
Plech became the coach of clubs from Gdańsk, Gorzów Wielkopolski and Wrocław. He was a manager of Polish national team which finished second in the 2001 Speedway World Cup Final behind Australia at Wrocław's Olympic Stadium. He was the coach of Polonia Bydgoszcz and Wybrzeże Gdańsk U-16 team.

Plech was also a speedway commentator for Polish television.
