= 1975 Speedway World Team Cup =

16th edition of the annual motorcycle speedway World Cup competition

Seasons
- ← 1974 1976 →

The 1975 Speedway World Team Cup was the 16th edition of the FIM Speedway World Team Cup to determine the team world champions.

The final took place at Motodrom Halbemond in Norden, Lower Saxony, West Germany. The title was won by England for the fifth consecutive year and sixth time in total. The sixth win took brought them level with Sweden for the record of most wins.

== Qualification ==
=== British (& Commonwealth) Round ===
- 14 July
- (England) Smallmead Stadium, Reading

Placing	Team / Rider name	Total	1	2	3	4	5	6	7	8	9	10	11	12	13	14	15	16	Pts	17	18	19	20
1	England	37	2	4	5	7	10	12	14	17	20	23	25	28	31	34	37	37		37	37	37	37
1	(9) Ray Wilson	7			1		3					3						0	7
1	(10) Peter Collins	10				2		2			3						3		10
1	(11) Dave Jessup	10		2						3			2			3			10
1	(12) John Louis	10	2						2					3	3				10
1	(19) Malcolm Simmons	0																	0
2	Australia	24	1	4	6	7	9	9	12	13	13	15	16	17	18	19	21	24		24	24	24	24
2	(13) John Boulger	9		3					3		F							3	9
2	(14) Phil Crump	6	1							1		2					2		6
2	(15) Phil Herne	4			2			0						1		1			4
2	(16) Billy Sanders	5				1	2						1		1				5
2	(20) Bob Humphreys	0																	0
3	New Zealand	21	3	4	4	4	5	8	9	9	11	11	14	14	16	18	19	21		21	21	21	21
3	(5) Ivan Mauger	11	3					3					3					2	11
3	(6) Barry Briggs	3		1			1							0			1		3
3	(7) Bruce Cribb	3				0			1			-				2			3
3	(8) Gary Peterson	4			0					E	2				2				4
3	(18) Larry Ross	0										0							0
4	Scotland	14	0	0	3	6	6	7	7	9	10	11	11	13	13	13	13	14		14	14	14	14
4	(1) Jim McMillan	8				3				2				2				1	8
4	(2) Bobby Beaton	3			3				F				0				-		3
4	(3) George Hunter	2		0				1				1			0				2
4	(4) Brian Collins	1	0				0				1					0			1
4	(17) Jim Gallacher	0															0		0
Placing	Team / Rider name	Total	1	2	3	4	5	6	7	8	9	10	11	12	13	14	15	16	Pts	17	18	19	20

M - exclusion for exceeding two-minute time allowance • T - exclusion for touching the tapes • X - other exclusion • E - retired or mechanical failure • F - fell

Helmet colours were permanent for each team (Red, Blue, White and Yellow/Black). Colours in diagrams indicate gate positions:
gate A – inside	gate B	gate C	gate D – outside

- England to Final

=== Scandinavian Round ===
- 8 June
- (Sweden) Målilla (Motorbana), Målilla
- Att: 2,200

1st	2nd	3rd	4th
Sweden - 38; Tommy Johansson - 12; Bernt Persson - 10; Tommy Jansson - 9 Sören Sjösten - 4 Jan Simensen - 3	Denmark - 25; Ole Olsen - 10; Jan Rene Henningsen - 6 Kurt Bøgh- 5 Leif Berlin - 4 Finn Thomsen - 0	Norway - 17; Øyvind S. Berg - 7 Dag Lovaas - 7 Reidar Eide - 3 Jan Terje Gravningen - 0 Helge Langli - 0	Finland - 16; Ila Teromaa - 6 Kai Niemi - 4 Markku Helminen - 3 Pekka Paljakka - 2 Kari Vuoristo - 1

- Sweden to Final

=== Continental Round ===
Quarter Final

- 8 June
- (Italy) San Savino Speedway Park, Civitanova Marche

1st	2nd	3rd	4th
West Germany - 33; Hans Wassermann - 11; Christoph Betzl - 7 Fritz Baur - 6 Georg Gilgenreiner - 5 Jan Käter - 4	Austria - 26; Josef Haider - 8 Herbert Szerecs - 8 Hubert Fischbacher- 5 Adi Funk - 5	Italy - 22; Giuseppe Marzotto - 11; Francesco Biginato - 6 Luigi Bazan - 2 Dario Casarsa - 2 Armando Terenzani - 1	Netherlands - 15; Henny Kroeze - 9 Henk Steman - 3 Frits Koppe - 2 Piet Seur - 1 Tonny Egges - 0

- West Germany and Austria to Continental Semifinal

Quarter Final

- 8 June
- (Hungary) Gázvezeték Street Sports Complex, Debrecen

1st	2nd	3rd	4th
Czechoslovakia - 32; Jan Klokocka - 12; Josef Minarik - 7 Jan Verner - 6 Vaclav Hejl - 4 Jan Hadek - 3	Hungary - 31; Istvan Sziraczky - 10; Janos Berki - 9 Pal Perenyi- 7 Janos Szoeke - 5	Bulgaria - 24; Peter Petkov - 8 Angel Eftimov - 6 Orlin Janakiev - 6 Christo Simeonov - 4 Nikolai Manev - 0	Yugoslavia - 8 Stefan Kekec - 4 Djuro Fleten - 2 Josip Francic - 1 Joze Milov - 1

- Czechoslovakia and Hungary to Continental Semifinal

Continental Semifinal

- 29 June
- (West Germany) Hansa Stadium, Bremen

1st	2nd	3rd	4th
Czechoslovakia - 40; Václav Verner - 12; Jan Klokocka - 11; Jiří Štancl - 9 Josef Minarik - 5 Petr Kucera - 3	West Germany - 32; Egon Müller - 10; Christoph Betzl - 8 Hans Wassermann- 8 Fritz Baur - 4 Georg Gilgenreiner - 2	Austria - 12; Walter Grubmuler - 6 Adi Funk - 4 Josef Haider - 2 Alex Taudtmann - 0 Herbert Szerecs - 0	Hungary - 11; Janos Jakab - 4 Istvan Sziraczky - 4 Pal Perenyi - 2 Janos Berki - 1 Janos Szoeke - 0

- Czechoslovakia and West Germany to Continental Final

Continental Final

- 12 July
- (Czechoslovakia) Slaný Speedway Stadium, Slaný

Placing	Team / Rider name	Total	1	2	3	4	5	6	7	8	9	10	11	12	13	14	15	16	Pts	17	18	19	20
1	Soviet Union	32	3	5	8	8	10	11	11	13	14	17	20	22	23	26	29	32		32	32	32	32
1	(5) Vladimir Gordeev	10	3					1					3					3	10
1	(6) Valery Gordeev	9		2			2							2			3		9
1	(7) Grigory Khlinovsky	6				F			X			3				3			6
1	(8) Viktor Trofimov	7			3					2	1				1				7
1	(18) Mikhail Starostin	0																	0
2	Poland	28	1	2	4	7	7	10	13	16	18	20	21	24	24	27	28	28		28	28	28	28
2	(13) Marek Cieślak	6		1					3		2							0	6
2	(14) Zenon Plech	7	1							3		2					1		7
2	(15) Henryk Glücklich	11			2			3						3		3			11
2	(16) Jerzy Rembas	4				3	0						1		F				4
2	(20) Edward Jancarz	0																	0
3	Czechoslovakia	26	3	5	5	6	9	11	12	14	15	15	15	18	20	22	24	26		26	26	26	26
3	(1) Jiří Štancl	8				1				2				3				2	8
3	(2) Jan Hadek	3			0				1				-				2		3
3	(3) Václav Verner	6		2				2				0			2				6
3	(4) Jan Klokocka	9	3				3				1					2			9
3	(17) Petr Kucera	0											0						0
4	West Germany	10	1	1	3	3	4	4	4	5	7	8	8	8	9	9	9	10		10	10	10	10
4	(9) Egon Müller	5			2		1					1						1	5
4	(10) Christoph Betzl	2				0		0			2						0		2
4	(11) Fritz Baur	1		F						1			0			-			1
4	(12) Hans Wassermann	2	1						0					0	1				2
4	(19) Georg Gilgenreiner	0														0			0
Placing	Team / Rider name	Total	1	2	3	4	5	6	7	8	9	10	11	12	13	14	15	16	Pts	17	18	19	20

M - exclusion for exceeding two-minute time allowance • T - exclusion for touching the tapes • X - other exclusion • E - retired or mechanical failure • F - fell

Helmet colours were permanent for each team (Red, Blue, White and Yellow/Black). Colours in diagrams indicate gate positions:
gate A – inside	gate B	gate C	gate D – outside

* Soviet Union and Poland to Final

== World Final ==
- 21 September
- (West Germany) Motodrom Halbemond, Norden
- Att: 20,000
- Referee: (West Germany) Georg Traunspurger

Placing	Team / Rider name	Total	1	2	3	4	5	6	7	8	9	10	11	12	13	14	15	16	Pts	17	18	19	20
1	England	41	0	3	6	9	12	13	15	18	21	23	26	29	32	35	38	41		41	41	41	41
1	(13) Malcolm Simmons	11		3					2		3							3	11
1	(14) John Louis	8	0							3		2					3		8
1	(15) Martin Ashby	10			3			1						3		3			10
1	(16) Peter Collins	12				3	3						3		3				12
1	(20) Dave Jessup	0																	0
2	Soviet Union	29	3	4	6	6	8	10	13	15	17	20	21	22	24	25	27	29		29	29	29	29
2	(1) Vladimir Gordeev	5				T				2				1				2	5
2	(2) Valery Gordeev	8			2				3				1				2		8
2	(3) Grigory Khlinovsky	8		1				2				3			2				8
2	(4) Viktor Trofimov	8	3				2				2					1			8
2	(17) Mikhail Starostin	0																	0
3	Sweden	16	2	4	4	6	7	10	10	11	12	12	14	14	14	14	15	16		16	16	16	16
3	(5) Anders Michanek	8	2					3					2					1	8
3	(6) Tommy Jansson	4		2			1							0			1		4
3	(7) Bernt Persson	2				2			0			0				0			2
3	(8) Sören Sjösten	1			0					1	-								1
3	(18) Sören Karlsson	1									1								1
4	Poland	9	1	1	2	3	3	3	4	4	4	5	5	7	7	9	9	9		9	9	9	9
4	(9) Henryk Glücklich	2			1		0					1						0	2
4	(10) Edward Jancarz	1				1		0			0						0		1
4	(11) Zenon Plech	0		0						0			-			-			0
4	(12) Marek Cieślak	4	1						1					2	0				4
4	(19) Jerzy Rembas	2											0			2			2
Placing	Team / Rider name	Total	1	2	3	4	5	6	7	8	9	10	11	12	13	14	15	16	Pts	17	18	19	20

M - exclusion for exceeding two-minute time allowance • T - exclusion for touching the tapes • X - other exclusion • E - retired or mechanical failure • F - fell

Helmet colours were permanent for each team (Red, Blue, White and Yellow/Black). Colours in diagrams indicate gate positions:
gate A – inside	gate B	gate C	gate D – outside

== See also ==
- 1975 Individual Speedway World Championship
- 1975 Speedway World Pairs Championship
