= 1974 Speedway World Team Cup =

15th edition of the annual motorcycle speedway World Cup competition

Seasons
- ← 1973 1975 →

The 1974 Speedway World Team Cup was the 15th edition of the FIM Speedway World Team Cup to determine the team world champions.

The final took place at Stadion Śląski, Chorzów in Poland. The title was won by England for the fourth consecutive year and fifth time in total. However they previously rode as Great Britain when they had the benefit of using Commonwealth riders The fifth win took them ahead of Poland (on four titles) and one behind Sweden (on six titles).

== Qualification ==
=== British (& Commonwealth) round ===
- 11 August
- (England) Foxhall Stadium, Ipswich

| Pos. | National team | Pts. | Riders |
|---|---|---|---|
| 1 | England | 41 | John Louis 12; Terry Betts 10; Dave Jessup 10; Peter Collins 9 |
| 2 | Australia | 31 | Phil Crump 10; Billy Sanders 9 John Boulger 7 Bob Valentine 5 |
| 3 | Scotland | 17 | George Hunter 8 Bobby Beaton 6 Jim McMillan 2 Bert Harkins 1 |
| 4 | New Zealand | 6 | Graeme Stapleton 3 Ronnie Moore 2 Bruce Cribb 1 Dave Gifford 0 Robin Adlington 0 |

=== Scandinavian round ===
- 3 June
- (Norway) Geiteryggen Speedwaybane, Skien

| Pos. | National team | Pts. | Riders |
|---|---|---|---|
| 1 | Sweden | 39 | Anders Michanek 12; Christer Löfqvist 10; Bengt Jansson 9 Tommy Johansson 8 |
| 2 | Norway | 24 | Edgar Stangeland 7 Oyvind S. Berg 6 Ulf Lovaas 6 Reidar Eide 4 Dag Lovaas 1 |
| 3 | Denmark | 20 | Ole Olsen 9 Nes Nielsen 4 Preben Rosenkilde 3 Leif Berlin 2 Finn Thomsen 2 |
| 4 | Finland | 13 | Matti Olin 7 Pekka Paljakka 3 Reino Santala 2 Veli-Pekka Teromaa 1 Kari Vuoristo 0 |

=== Continental round ===
Quarter-Final

- 9 June
- (West Germany) Breitwangbahn, Bopfingen

| Pos. | National team | Pts. | Riders |
|---|---|---|---|
| 1 | West Germany | 43 | Josef Angermüller 12; Egon Müller 12; Manfred Poschenreider 12; Jan Käter 7 |
| 2 | Austria | 35 | Josef Haider 9 Hubert Fischbacher 9 Josef Bössner 9 Helmut Schippl 8 |
| 3 | Yugoslavia | 15 | Stefan Kekec 4 Josip Francic 4 Vlado Kocuvan 4 Radovan Toplisek 3 |
| 4 | Italy | 3 | Annibale Pretto 2 Francesco Biginato 1 Giuseppe Marzotto 0 Dario Corsarsa 0 Stefano Quacencan 0 |

Quarter Final

- 9 June
- (Hungary) Borsod Volán Stadion, Miskolc

| Pos. | National team | Pts. | Riders |
|---|---|---|---|
| 1 | Hungary | 41 | Janos Szoeke 12; Istvan Sziraczki 11; Janos Berki 9 Sandor Csatho 9 |
| 2 | Czechoslovakia | 37 | Karel Vobornik 11; Václav Verner 10; Jan Verner 9 Vaclav Hejl 7 |
| 3 | Bulgaria | 12 | Peter Petkov 5 Peter Iliev 3 Alexander Kostov 2 Angel Eftimov 2 |
| 4 | Hungary II | 6 | Janos Uveges 2 Gyula Oszko 2 Laszlo Zahoran 2 Janos Jakab 0 |

Hungary II replaced Romania

Semi-Final

- 29 June
- (West Germany) Altes Stadion, Abensberg

| Pos. | National team | Pts. | Riders |
|---|---|---|---|
| 1 | West Germany | 39 | Egon Müller 11; Manfred Poschenreider 11; Christoph Betzl 8 Jan Käter 6 Josef Angermüller 3 |
| 2 | Czechoslovakia | 37 | Jiří Štancl 0 Milan Špinka 0 Václav Verner 0 Jan Hadek 0 |
| 3 | Austria | 17 | Hubert Fischbacher 5 Josef Haider 5 Josef Bössner 4 Helmut Schippl 3 |
| 4 | Hungary | 6 | Istvan Sziraczki 3 Janos Szoeke 1 Pal Perenyi 1 Sandor Csatho 1 Laszlo Domokocs 0 |

Final

- 6 July
- (Czechoslovakia) Slaný Speedway Stadium, Slaný

| Pos. | National team | Pts. | Riders |
|---|---|---|---|
| 1 | Soviet Union | 38 | Valery Gordeev 12; Vladimir Gordeev 9 Grigori Khlinovsky 9 Vladimir Zaplechny 5 Anatoly Kuzmin 3 |
| 2 | Poland | 31 | Zenon Plech 10; Ryszard Fabiszewski 9 Jan Mucha 6 Edward Jancarz 6 |
| 3 | Czechoslovakia | 19 | Jan Holub I 5 Jan Hadek 5 Milan Špinka 3 Václav Verner 3 Jan Klokocka 3 |
| 4 | West Germany | 8 | Josef Angermüller 4 Egon Müller 3 Jan Käter 1 Manfred Poschenreider 0 |

== World final ==
- 15 September
- Silesian Stadium, Chorzów

| Pos. | National team | Pts. | Riders |
|---|---|---|---|
| 1st | England | 42 | Peter Collins - 12; John Louis - 12; Dave Jessup - 10; Malcolm Simmons - 8 Ray Wilson - dnr |
| 2nd | Sweden | 31 | Sören Sjösten - 10; Anders Michanek - 9 Tommy Jansson 7 Christer Löfqvist 5 Tommy Johansson dnr |
| 3rd | Poland | 13 | Jan Mucha - 4 Zenon Plech - 4 Andrzej Jurczyński - 3 Andrzej Tkocz - 2 Jerzy Szczakiel - 0 |
| 4th | Soviet Union | 10 | Mikhail Krasnov - 5 Valery Gordeev - 4 Viktor Kalmykov - 1 Anatoly Kuzmin - 0 Mikhail Starostin - dnr |

== See also ==
- 1974 Individual Speedway World Championship
- 1974 Speedway World Pairs Championship
