= 1972 Speedway World Team Cup =

13th edition of the annual motorcycle speedway World Cup competition

Seasons
- ← 1971 1973 →

The 1972 Speedway World Team Cup was the 13th edition of the FIM Speedway World Team Cup to determine the team world champions.

The final took place at the Olching Speedwaybahn in Olching, West Germany. The title was won by Great Britain for the third time.

== Qualifying ==
=== Scandinavian round ===
- 25 June
- (Norway) Nærbø Idrettslunden, Nærbø

Pos.	National team	Pts.	Riders
1	Sweden	37	Hasse Holmqvist 10; Christer Löfqvist 10; Jan Simensen 9 Bernt Persson 8
2	Denmark	25	Ole Olsen 11; Kurt Bøgh 7 Bent Nørregaard-Jensen 5 Nils Schelde 1 Henning Hansen 1
3	Norway	23	Reidar Eide 9 Odd Fossengen 4 Dag Løvaas 4 Edgar Stangeland 3 Svein Kaasa 3
4	Finland	11	Hannu Känkänen 3 Kari Vuoristo 3 Haki Ahonen 3 Kakio Leppåsalko 1 Pekka Paljakka 1

=== Continental round ===
Quarter-Final

- 11 June
- (Socialist Federal Republic of Yugoslavia) Mladost Stadum, Prelog

Pos.	National team	Pts.	Riders
1	Czechoslovakia	48	Jiří Štancl 12; Jan Holub I 12; Václav Verner 12; Petr Ondrašík 6 Miloslav Verner 6
2	Bulgaria	23	Peter Iliev 8 Nedjelko Nedjelkov 7 Peter Kostov 5 Angel Eftimov 3
3	Yugoslavia	22	Drasko Orsic 7 Evald Babic 6 Vlado Miler 6 Josip Francic 3
4	Yugoslavia II	3	Milija Stojkovic 1 Stefan Kekec 1 Janez Tomazic 1 Jose Lazbaher 0

Quarter Final

- 18 June
- (West Germany) Rodenbach Motodrom, Rodenbach

Pos.	National team	Pts.	Riders
1	West Germany	39	Manfred Poschenreider 12; Rudi Kastl 11; Josef Angermüller 9 Jan Käter 7
2	Austria	17	Gunther Walla 7 Heinz Zimmermann 4 Josef Haider 4 Alex Taudtmann 2
3	Hungary	17	Ferencs Radacsi 7 Barnabas Gyepes 5 Pal Perenyi 4 Sandor Csatho 1
4	Scandinavian Select	23	Jorn Mogensen 10; Stefan Salomonsson 6 Stefan Johansson 6 Erik Tilgaard 1

- Austria awarded 2nd place because they had more heat winners than Hungary (2 to 0).
- East Germany withdrew and were replaced by Scandinavian Select who were ineligible to qualify for the next round.

Semi-Final

- 1 July
- (Czechoslovakia) Slaný Speedway Stadium, Slaný

Pos.	National team	Pts.	Riders
1	Czechoslovakia	0	Milan Špinka 12; Zdeněk Majstr 9 Petr Ondrašík 9 Václav Verner 9 Jiří Štancl 8
2	West Germany	0	Josef Angermüller 9 Jan Käter 8 Manfred Poschenreider 8 Rudolf Kastl 7
3	Bulgaria	0	Nedjelko Nedjelkov 4 Peter Iliev 3 Peter Petkov 3 Alexander Kostov 0
4	Austria	0	Josef Haider 5 Gunther Walla 1 Alex Taudtmann 1 Michael Laussegger 1 Heinz Zimmermann 0

Final

- 23 July
- (Soviet Union) Leningrad Speedway Stadium, Leningrad

Pos.	National team	Pts.	Riders
1	Poland	40	Zenon Plech 12; Henryk Glücklich 10; Paweł Waloszek 7 Edward Jancarz 6 Jerzy Gryt 5
2	Soviet Union	33	Anatoli Kuzmin 11; Georgi Ivanov 9 Grigori Khlinovsky 6 Viktor Kalmikov 6 Gennady Kurilenko 1
3	Czechoslovakia	13	Jan Holub I 5 Zdeněk Majstr 3 Petr Ondrašík 3 Milan Špinka 1 Jiří Štancl
4	West Germany	9	Josef Angermüller 3 Jan Käter 3 Manfred Poschenreider 2 Helmut Reiter 1 Rudolf Kastl 0

== World final ==
- 24 September
- (West Germany) Olching Speedwaybahn

Pos.	National team	Pts.	Riders
1st	Great Britain	36	Ivan Mauger - 11; John Louis - 9 Ray Wilson - 8 Terry Betts - 8 Ronnie Moore - dnr
2nd	Soviet Union	21	Anatoly Kuzmin - 6 Viktor Kalmykov - 5 Viktor Trofimov - 5 Grigory Khlinovsky - 5 Valery Gordeev - dnr
3rd	Poland	21	Zenon Plech - 7 Henryk Glücklich - 6 Paweł Waloszek - 5 Zdzisław Dobrucki - 3 Marek Cieślak - 0
4th	Sweden	18	Christer Löfqvist - 6 Anders Michanek - 4 Tommy Jansson 4 Jan Simensen 3 Göte Nordin 1

Run-off for silver
Soviet Union 7 (Kalmykov 3, Kuzmin 2, Khlinovsky 1, Trofimov 1) bt Poland 5 (Waloszek 3, Plech 2, Glücklich 0, Dobrucki 0)

== See also ==
- 1972 Individual Speedway World Championship
- 1972 Speedway World Pairs Championship
