= Anders Michanek =

Swedish speedway rider

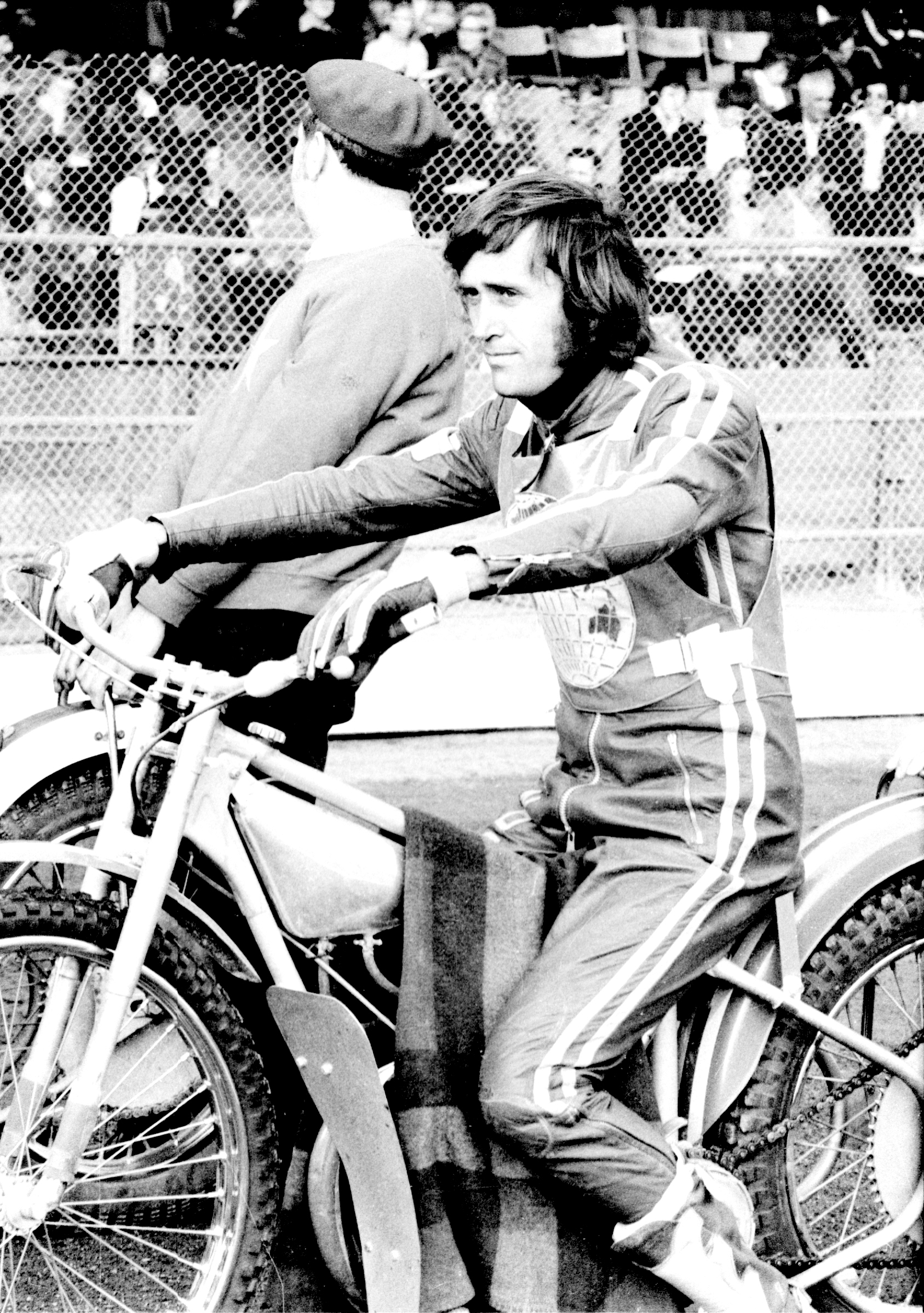
- Anders Michanek at the 1975 Intercontinental Final
- Born: 30 May 1943 (age 83); Stockholm, Sweden
- Nationality: Swedish

Career history

Sweden
- 1965–1966, 1984–1985: Gamarna
- 1967–1983: Getingarna
- 1989: Rospiggarna

Great Britain
- 1967: Long Eaton Archers
- 1968: Leicester Lions
- 1970: Newcastle Diamonds
- 1971–1973, 1975, 1981: Reading Racers
- 1977: Cradley Heathens
- 1979: Ipswich Witches

Individual honours
- 1974: World Champion
- 1977: Long Track World Champion
- 1972, 1975, 1976, 1978, 1982: Swedish Champion
- 1973: European Final winner
- 1967, 1973: Brandonapolis
- 1973: Pride of the East
- 1973: Blue Riband
- 1973: Spring Classic
- 1967: Olympique
- 1973: Superama
- 1973: Golden Gauntlets

Team honours
- 1973, 1974, 1975: World Pairs Champion
- 1970: World Team Champion
- 1973: British League Champion
- 1965, 1970, 1974, 1975: Swedish Pairs Champion
- 1967, 1969, 1974, 1978, 1979, 1980, 1981: Allsvenskan Champion
- 1982, 1983: Elitserien Champion
- 1965: Allsvenskan Div 2 Champion
- 1972: Spring Gold Cup Winner

Anders Michanek (born 30 May 1943) is a Swedish Speedway rider. In 1974 he won the Speedway World Championship in his Swedish homeland with a maximum score of 15 points. He earned 101 caps for the Sweden national speedway team.

== Career ==
Michanek was born on 30 May 1943 in Stockholm, Sweden. He had a successful career riding in the British League. He initially signed for the Long Eaton Archers in 1967 before going on to ride for various clubs including Leicester Lions, Newcastle Diamonds, Reading Racers, Ipswich Witches and Cradley Heathens.

Michaenk won the Speedway World Team Cup with Sweden in 1970.

During the 1971 Swedish final, Michanek refused to participate in a re-run for the title and was disqualified. Michanek and Göte Nordin both finished on 14 points and in the race off Michanek beat Nordin after the latter pulled out of the race, claiming that he saw a red light to stop the race. The match referee ordered a re-run but Michanek refused to take part claiming there was no red light. The incident resulted in violence between rival supporters and was headline news in Sweden. Michanek contemplated retirement from the sport but continued to ride. Spurred on by the incident he went on to win the Swedish title the following year and then won four more during his career.

In 1973, Michanek won the 1973 Speedway World Pairs Championship partnering Tommy Jansson in Borås.

Michanek won the World Final in 1974 at the Ullevi Stadium in Gothenburg, and won the Swedish Individual Championship several times. He also successfully defended his world pairs crown in 1974 at the Hyde Road Speedway in Manchester with Sören Sjösten. He won for a third time in succession in 1975 in Wrocław, Poland, with Tommy Jansson again.

When Michanek finished second behind Denmark's Ole Olsen in the 1975 World Final at London's Wembley Stadium, it was reported that he was relieved to have relinquished his world title as he had not enjoyed the pressure of being the World Champion. Reports also told that he only started to enjoy the 1975 Final after finishing third in his opening heat behind Olsen and Russian rider Viktor Trofimov knowing that from that point he was not likely to repeat his 1974 win. This was reflected when he came out and won his final four races to finish 2 points behind the undefeated Olsen in second place.

In 1977, Michanek won the Long Track World Championship in Aalborg, Denmark.

== World final appearances ==
=== Individual World Championship ===
- 1967 – (England) London, Wembley Stadium – 6th – 9pts
- 1968 – (Sweden) Gothenburg, Ullevi – 7th – 9pts
- 1970 – (Poland) Wrocław, Olympic Stadium – 9th – 7pts
- 1971 – (Sweden) Gothenburg, Ullevi – 5th – 11pts
- 1972 – (England) London, Wembley Stadium – 7th – 8pts
- 1973 – (Poland) Chorzów, Silesian Stadium – 10th – 6pts
- 1974 – (Sweden) Gothenburg, Ullevi – Winner – 15pts
- 1975 – (England) London, Wembley Stadium – 2nd – 13pts
- 1976 – (Poland) Chorzów, Silesian Stadium – Reserve – 2pts
- 1977 – (Sweden) Gothenburg, Ullevi – 8th – 8pts
- 1978 – (England) London, Wembley Stadium – 10th – 7pts

=== World Pairs Championship ===
- 1971 – (Poland) Rybnik, Rybnik Municipal Stadium (with Bernt Persson) – 3rd – 22pts (13)
- 1972 – (Sweden) Ryavallen Borås (with Bengt Jansson) – 4th – 22pts (15+2)
- 1973 – (Sweden) Ryavallen, Borås (with Tommy Jansson) – Winner – 24pts (15)
- 1974 – (England) Manchester, Hyde Road (with Sören Sjösten) – Winner – 28pts (14)
- 1975 – (Poland) Wrocław, Olympic Stadium (with Tommy Jansson) – Winner – 24pts (17)
- 1977 – (England) Manchester, Hyde Road (with Bernt Persson) – 2nd – 18pts (16)

=== World Team Cup ===
- 1968 – (England) London, Wembley Stadium (with Ove Fundin / Bengt Jansson / Olle Nygren / Torbjörn Harrysson) – 2nd – 30pts (7)
- 1969 – (Poland) Rybnik, Rybnik Municipal Stadium (with Bengt Jansson / Sören Sjösten / Ove Fundin / Torbjörn Harrysson) – 4th – 12pts (7)
- 1970 – (England) London, Wembley Stadium (with Ove Fundin / Bengt Jansson / Sören Sjösten) – Winner – 42pts (10)
- 1971 – (Poland) Wrocław, Olympic Stadium (with Bernt Persson] / Sören Sjösten/ Bengt Jansson / Leif Enecrona) – 4th – 18pts (9)
- 1972 – (West Germany) Olching, Olching Speedwaybahn (with Tommy Jansson / Christer Lofqvist / Jan Simensen / Göte Nordin) – 4th – 18pts (4)
- 1973 – (England) London, Wembley Stadium (with Bernt Persson / Bengt Jansson / Tommy Jansson) – 2nd – 31pts (11)
- 1974 – (Poland) Chorzów, Silesian Stadium (with Sören Sjösten / Tommy Jansson / Christer Lofqvist) – 2nd – 31pts (9)
- 1975 – (West Germany) Norden, Motodrom Halbemond (with Tommy Jansson / Bernt Persson / Sören Sjösten / Sören Karlsson) – 3rd – 17pts (8)
- 1976 – (England) London, White City Stadium (with Bernt Persson / Lars-Åke Andersson / Bengt Jansson / Christer Löfqvist) – 3rd – 26pts (11)
- 1977 – (Poland) Wrocław, Olympic Stadium (with Bengt Jansson / Tommy Nilsson / Bernt Persson / Sören Karlsson) – 4th – 11pts (5)

=== Long Track World Championship ===
- 1977 – (Denmark) Aalborg – Winner
- 1979 – (Czech Republic) Mariánské Lázně – 2nd
- 1981 – (Socialist Federal Republic of Yugoslavia) Gornja Radgona – 3rd
