= Bernt Persson =

Swedish speedway rider (1946–2020)

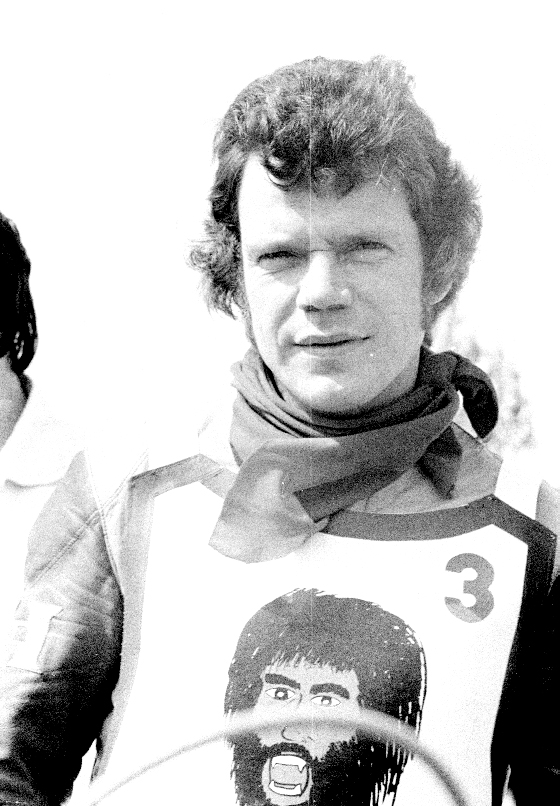
- Born: 24 June 1946; Eskilstuna, Sweden
- Died: 21 September 2020 (aged 74)
- Nickname: Bernie
- Nationality: Swedish

Career history

Great Britain
- 1965, 1967: Edinburgh Monarchs
- 1968: Coatbridge Monarchs
- 1969-1973, 1975-1977: Cradley Heathens/United
- 1978: Sheffield Tigers

Sweden
- 1963-1968, 1977-1983: Smederna
- 1965: Vargarna
- 1969-1976: Indianerna
- 1985-1986: Tuna Rebels

Individual honours
- 1977: Swedish Champion

Team honours
- 1977: Allsvenskan Champion
- 1972, 1973: Allsvenskan Div 2 (West) Champion
- 1985: Allsvenskan Div 2 (North) Champion
- 1967: Allsvenskan Div 3 (West) Champion

Bernt Eveart Persson (24 June 1946 - 20 September 2020) was a Swedish international motorcycle speedway rider. He earned 102 caps for the Sweden national speedway team.

== Career ==
Persson started his career in the Swedish Speedway Team Championship riding for Smederna but came to prominence racing in the British leagues from 1965 to 1978. In 1965, after competing in the Brandonapolis at Coventry, he signed to race for the Edinburgh Monarchs for the latter part of the 1965 British League season.

Persson was unable to ride for Edinburgh in 1966 because he was serving in the Swedish army but returned in 1967. During 1967, he established himself as one of the world's leading riders finishing 9th in the 1967 Individual Speedway World Championship final.

Persson joined Cradley Heathens/United in 1969 and spent five years at the Dudley Wood Stadium in his first spell with the club.

Persson's greatest achievement was finishing runner up in the 1972 Speedway World Championship. After tying with the legendary Ivan Mauger on 13 points, during the 1972 Individual Speedway World Championship final, held on 16 September at Wembley Stadium, he lost the run-off and missed out on becoming the world champion.

Persson went on to win three medals at the Speedway World Cup (1973, 1975 and 1977) and became Swedish Champion in 1977.

== World Final Appearances ==
=== Individual World Championship ===
- 1967 - (England) London, Wembley Stadium - 9th - 6pts
- 1968 - (England) London, Wembley Stadium - 16th - 1pt
- 1971 - (Sweden) Gothenburg, Ullevi - 6th - 9pts
- 1972 - (England) London, Wembley Stadium - 2nd - 13pts
- 1973 - (Poland) Chorzów, Silesian Stadium - 16th - 0pts
- 1975 - (England) London, Wembley Stadium - 10th - 5pts
- 1977 - (Sweden) Göteborg, Ullevi - 11th - 6pts
- 1978 - (England) London, Wembley Stadium - Reserve - did not ride

=== World Pairs Championship ===
- 1971 - (Poland) Rybnik, Rybnik Municipal Stadium (with Anders Michanek) - 3rd - 22pts (9)
- 1972 - (Sweden) Borås (with Hasse Holmqvist) - 3rd - 22pts (13+3)
- 1976 - (Sweden) Eskilstuna, Eskilstuna Motorstadion (with Bengt Jansson) - 3rd - 22pts (11)
- 1977 - (England) Manchester, Hyde Road (with Anders Michanek) - 2nd - 18pts (2)

=== World Team Cup ===
- 1971 - (Poland) Wrocław, Olympic Stadium (with Anders Michanek / Sören Sjösten / Bengt Jansson] / Leif Enecrona) - 4th - 18pts (0)
- 1973 - (England) London, Wembley Stadium (with Anders Michanek / Bengt Jansson / Tommy Jansson) - 2nd - 31pts (9)
- 1975 - (West Germany) Norden, Motodrom Halbemond (with Anders Michanek / Tommy Jansson / Sören Sjösten / Sören Karlsson) - 3rd - 17pts (2)
- 1976 - (England) London, White City Stadium (with Anders Michanek / Bengt Jansson / Lars-Åke Andersson / Christer Löfqvist) - 3rd - 26pts (8)
- 1977 - (Poland) Wrocław, Olympic Stadium (with Bengt Jansson / Anders Michanek / Tommy Nilsson / Sören Karlsson) - 4th - 11pts (4)
