= 1973 Speedway World Team Cup =

14th edition of the annual motorcycle speedway World Cup competition

Seasons
- ← 1972 1974 →

The 1973 Speedway World Team Cup was the 14th edition of the FIM Speedway World Team Cup to determine the team world champions.

The final took place at Wembley Stadium in London. The title was won by Great Britain for the third consecutive year and fourth time in total. The fourth win drew Britain level with Poland on four titles won but Sweden remained ahead on the number of titles won with six.

== Qualification ==
=== Scandninavian round ===
- 24 June
- (Denmark) Fredericia Speedway Stadium, Fredericia

Pos.	National team	Pts.	Riders
1	Sweden	37	Anders Michanek 11; Tommy Jansson 9 Bernt Persson 9 Bengt Jansson 8
2	Norway	35	Ulf Løvaas 10; Edgar Stangeland 10; Dag Løvaas 8 Øyvind S. Berg 7
3	Denmark	23	Ole Olsen 12; Kurt Bøgh 4 Jens-Erik Krause-Kjaer 4 Arne Andrease 3
4	Finland	1	Reino Santala 1 Ari Hiljanen 0 Kari Vuoristo 0 Ilkka Teromaa 0 Veli-Pekka Teromaa 0

=== Continental round ===
Quarter-Final

- 17 June
- (Hungary) Gázvezeték Street Sports Complex, Debrecen

Pos.	National team	Pts.	Riders
1	West Germany	45	Josef Angermüller 12; Manfred Poschenreider 12; Hans Siegl 10; Egon Müller 6 Jan Käter 5
2	Hungary	24	Barnabas Gyepes 7 Janos Berki 7 Pal Perenyi 6 Ferenc Radacsi 3 Tibor Danka 1
3	Czechoslovakia II	21	Miroslav Rosulek; Jan Klokocka; Petr Kucera; Jan Holub; Karel Vobornik
4	Austria	6	Josef Bössner 3 Heinz Zimmermann 2 Josef Haider 1 Walter Detter 0

- Czechoslovakia II replaced Italy

Quarter-Final

- 17 June
- (Socialist Federal Republic of Yugoslavia) Kovinar Stadium, Maribor

Pos.	National team	Pts.	Riders
1	Czechoslovakia	47	Milan Špinka 12; Jiří Štancl 12; Petr Ondrašík 12; Miloslav Verner 11
2	Bulgaria	24	Peter Petkov 8 Peter Iliev 6 Angel Eftimov 6 Peter Kostov 4
3	Yugoslavia	15	Vlado Miler 6 Stefan Kekec 4 Alojz Vurzer 3 Milovan Stankovic 2
4	Austria II	10	Walter Grubmüller 4 Josef Scharl 3 Michael Lausegger 3 Alex Taudtmann 0

Austria II replaced East Germany

Semi-Final

- 30 June
- (Czechoslovakia) Markéta Stadium, Prague

Pos.	National team	Pts.	Riders
1	Czechoslovakia	43	Jiří Štancl 12; Milan Špinka 9 Petr Ondrašík 9 Jan Klokocka 6 Václav Verner 6
2	Hungary	24	Pal Perenyi 8 Janos Berki 7 Istvan Sziraczky 6 Barnabas Gyepes 3
3	West Germany	17	Hans Siegl 8 Egon Müller 7 Manfred Poschenreider 2 Jan Käter 1
4	Bulgaria	11	Angel Eftimov 4 Peter Petkov 3 Peter Iliev 2 Nedjelko Nedjelkov 2

Final

- 5 August
- (Soviet Union) Trud Stadium, Balakovo

Pos.	National team	Pts.	Riders
1	Soviet Union	35	Valery Gordeev 11; Grigory Khlinovsky 9 Viktor Kalmikov 7 Yury Dubinin 6 Vladimir Paznikov 2
2	Poland	31	Edward Jancarz 9 Zenon Plech 9 Jan Mucha 8 Ryszard Fabiszewski 4 Paweł Waloszek 1
3	Czechoslovakia	23	Jiří Štancl 7 Petr Ondrašík 7 Milan Špinka 5 Zdeněk Majstr 4
4	Hungary	6	Janos Berki 4 Ferenc Radacsi 1 Laszlo Zahoran 1 Jozsef Szabo 0 Istvan Sziraczki 0

== World final ==
- 15 September
- (England) Wembley Stadium, London

Pos.	National team	Pts.	Riders
1st	Great Britain	37	Peter Collins - 12; John Louis - 9 Ray Wilson - 8 Terry Betts - 8 Dave Jessup - dnr
2nd	Sweden	31	Anders Michanek - 11; Bernt Persson - 9 Bengt Jansson 6 Tommy Jansson 5 Sören Sjösten dnr
3rd	Soviet Union	20	Valery Gordeev - 7 Vladimir Paznikov - 5 Grigory Khlinovsky - 4 Aleksandr Pavlov - 2 Viktor Trofimov - 2
4th	Poland	8	Zenon Plech - 5 Edward Jancarz - 2 Paweł Waloszek - 1 Jerzy Szczakiel - 0 Jan Mucha - dnr

== See also ==
- 1973 Individual Speedway World Championship
- 1973 Speedway World Pairs Championship
