= Malcolm Simmons (speedway rider) =

British speedway rider

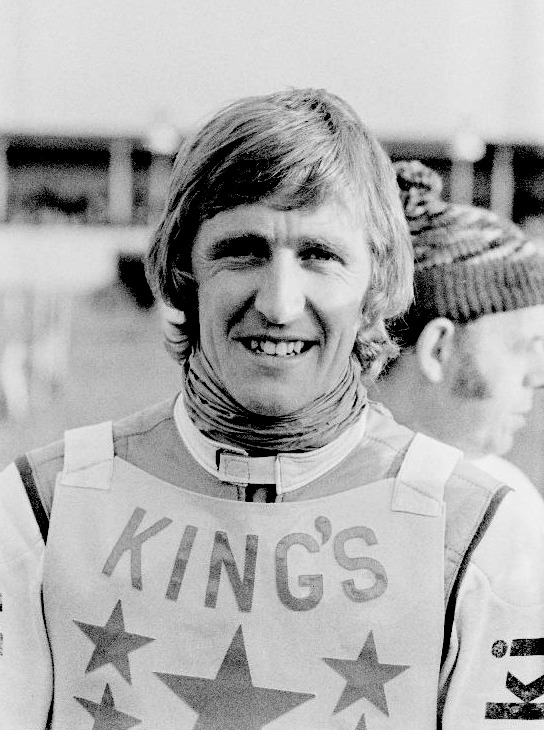
- Born: 20 March 1946; Tonbridge, England
- Died: 25 May 2014 (aged 68)
- Nickname: Simmo
- Nationality: British (English)

Career history
- 1963: Hackney Hawks
- 1964-1967: West Ham Hammers
- 1968-1974, 1986, 1993: King's Lynn Stars
- 1975-1980: Poole Pirates
- 1981-1984: Wimbledon Dons
- 1985: Swindon Robins
- 1986-1987: Hackney Kestrels
- 1989: Arena Essex Hammers

Individual honours
- 1976: British Champion
- 1974: Spring Classic
- 1975, 1976, 1977, 1978: Blue Riband
- 1976: Internationale
- 1976: Littlechild Trophy
- 1977: Superama
- 1977: Southern Masters
- 1982: The Laurels

Team honours
- 1973, 1974, 1975, 1977: World Team Cup Winner
- 1976, 1977, 1978: World Pairs Champion
- 1965: British League Champion
- 1965: British League KO Cup Winner
- 1965, 1966, 1967: London Cup
- 1973: Spring Gold Cup

Malcolm Simmons (20 March 1946 – 25 May 2014) was a motorcycle speedway rider from England. He earned 73 international caps for the England national speedway team and five caps for the Great Britain team.

== Career ==
Simmons was born in Tonbridge, Kent. After starting in second-half races at New Cross, he made his Provincial League debut at Hackney Hawks in 1963 aged seventeen but was unable to break into the Hackney team regularly so moved to the newly re-opened West Ham Hammers for the 1964 season. In 1965 Simmons won a British League and British League Knockout Cup double with West Ham. In 1968, he moved to the King's Lynn Stars and stayed there for the next seven seasons. He was consistently at the top of the Stars averages and scored over 2112 points for the club.

Simmons signed for the Poole Pirates in 1975 from King's Lynn. In his first season for Poole in 31 league matches, he achieved 16 maximum scores (15 full and 1 paid) and he became the first Poole rider to secure a ten-point average in the British League. Simmons topped the Pirates averages for the next six years and he came to be affectionately known by the Poole fans as 'Super Simmo'. In 1979, the Pirates were taken over by new owners and Simmons became unsettled, asking for a transfer in 1980. At a pairs event at Poole that year, Simmons was accused by the Poole management of not trying and he was subsequently sacked by the club.

Simmons moved to Wimbledon in 1981, where he spent four seasons and moved to the Swindon Robins for one season in 1985. Simmons signed for former club Hackey, now renamed Hackney Kestrels, in 1986 for two years before he suffered a bad shoulder injury. He then made a couple of short come-backs at Arena Essex and King's Lynn.

Simmons captained England and Great Britain at full international level. He finished runner-up to Peter Collins in the 1976 Speedway World Championship, but became World Pairs Champion with John Louis the same year. He again became World Pairs Champion in 1977 with Peter Collins, and again in 1978 with Gordon Kennett. Simmons became British Champion in 1976. He won the World Team Cup on four occasions—1973, 1974, 1975 and 1977—once with Great Britain and three times with England.

Simmons signed as a rider for Mildenhall in 2001 to ride occasionally in the Conference League, aged 56.

== World Final Appearances ==
=== Individual World Championship ===
- 1975 - (England) London, Wembley Stadium - 7th - 10pts
- 1976 - (Poland) Chorzów, Silesian Stadium - 2nd - 13pts
- 1978 - (England) London, Wembley Stadium - 6th - 10pts

=== World Pairs Championship ===
- 1976 - (Sweden) Eskilstuna, Snälltorpet (with John Louis) - Winner - 27pts (10)
- 1977 – (England) Manchester, Hyde Road (with Peter Collins) – Winner – 28pts (13)
- 1978 - (Poland) Chorzów, Silesian Stadium (with Gordon Kennett) - Winner - 24pts (15+3)
- 1979 - (Denmark) Vojens, Speedway Center (with Michael Lee) - 2nd - 24pts (9)

=== World Team Cup ===
- 1973* - (England) London, Wembley Stadium (with Peter Collins / Ray Wilson / Terry Betts) - Winner - 37pts (8)
- 1974 - (Poland) Chorzów, Silesian Stadium (with Peter Collins / John Louis / Dave Jessup) - Winner - 42pts (8)
- 1975 - (West Germany) Norden, Motodrom Halbemond (with Peter Collins / Martin Ashby / John Louis) – Winner – 41pts (11)
- 1977 - (Poland) Wrocław, Olympic Stadium (with Peter Collins / Michael Lee / Dave Jessup / John Davis) - Winner - 37pts (9)
- 1978 - (West Germany) Landshut, Ellermühle Stadium (with Dave Jessup / Peter Collins / Gordon Kennett / Michael Lee) - 2nd - 27pts (8)

* 1973 for Great Britain. All others for England.
