= Anatoly Kuzmin (speedway rider) =

Soviet speedway rider

- Born: 3 March 1950; Ufa, Russian SFSR, Soviet Union
- Died: 7 January 1978 (aged 27)
- Nationality: Russian

Career history

Soviet Union
- 1968: Ufa
- 1969–1988: Daugavpils

Individual honours
- 1972: Speedway World Championship finalist
- 1972: Soviet championship bronze

Team honours
- 1971: World Cup silver

Anatoly Kuzmin (3 March 1950 – 7 January 1978) was a Soviet international speedway rider.

== Speedway career ==
Kuzmin reached the final of the Speedway World Championship in the 1972 Individual Speedway World Championship. He was one of six Russians that competed in the 1972 World final after strong performances in the Continental final and European final.

When Kuzmin was drafted into the army in 1969, he moved to Daugavpils and became part of the Lokomotiv Daugavpils team from 1969 to 1988. He won the Latvian Championship in 1976 and 1977. He also won the bronze medal at the Soviet Union championship in 1972.

Kuzmin died in a car accident on 7 January 1978.

== World final appearances ==
=== Individual World Championship ===
- 1972 – (England) London, Wembley Stadium – 12th – 4pts

=== World Pairs Championship ===
- 1973 - (Sweden) Borås (with Vladimir Gordeev) - 4th - 20pts

=== World Team Cup ===
- 1971 - (Poland) Wrocław, Olympic Stadium (with Vladimir Smirnov / Vladimir Gordeev / Viktor Trofimov / Grigory Khlinovsky) - 2nd - 22pts (3)
- 1972 - (Germany) Olching, (with Viktor Trofimov / Grigory Khlinovsky / Viktor Kalmykov) - 2nd - 21 + 7pts (6 +2)
- 1974 - (Poland) Chorzów, Stadion Śląski, Chorzów (with Valery Gordeev / Mikhail Krasnov / Viktor Kalmykov) - 4th - 10pts (0)
