= John Louis (speedway rider) =

British motorcycle speedway rider (1941–2024)

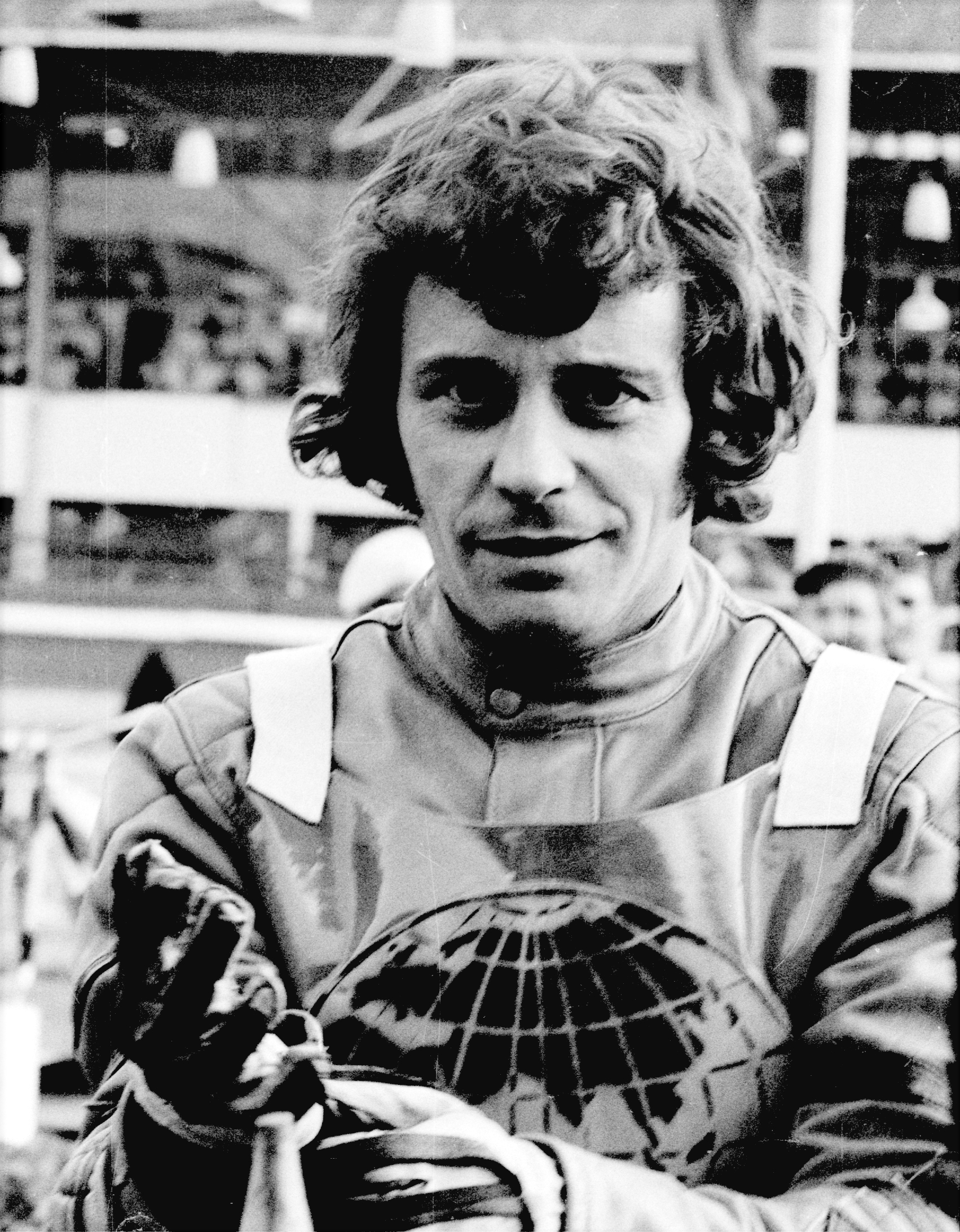
- Born: 14 June 1941; Ipswich, England
- Died: April 2024 (aged 82)
- Nickname: Tiger
- Nationality: British (English)

Career history
- 1970–1980: Ipswich Witches
- 1970: Newport Wasps
- 1981–1982: Halifax Dukes
- 1983–1984: King's Lynn Stars

Individual honours
- 1971: British League Div II Riders' Champion
- 1975: British Champion
- 1976: Southern Riders' Champion
- 1979: British League Riders' Champion
- 1971, 1978, 1979: Second City Trophy
- 1972, 1979: Star of Anglia
- 1974: Superama
- 1975: Pride of the East
- 1975, 1978: Golden Sovereign
- 1975: Golden Gauntlets

Team honours
- 1970, 1971: British League Div II KO Cup winner
- 1972, 1974, 1975: World Team Cup Winner
- 1975, 1976: British League Champion
- 1976, 1978: British League KO Cup winner
- 1976: World Pairs Champion
- 1976, 1977: British League Pairs Champion
- 1976: Spring Gold Cup

John Charles Louis (14 June 1941 – April 2024) was an English international motorcycle speedway rider. He was the father of Great Britain International Chris Louis. He earned 54 international caps for the England national speedway team and four caps for the Great Britain team. He later managed the England national team from 1994 to 1998.

== Career history ==
John Charles Louis was born in Ipswich on 14 June 1941. He started his motorcycling career in scrambling and was tempted to have a go at speedway when Ipswich re-opened in 1969. He made his debut in 1970 and by the following year topped the national Second Division averages. He won the British League Division Two Riders Championship, held at Hackney Wick Stadium on 2 October 1971 and was a leading rider in the division, competing in the silver helmet races.

In 1972, Ipswich gained admission to the top flight by purchasing West Ham's licence and Louis spearheaded the Witches team, making his World Final debut at London's Wembley Stadium in 1972, finishing in fifth place.

Louis finished fourth at the 1974 World Final at the Ullevi Stadium in Gothenburg, Sweden and improved to third in the 1975 World Final at Wembley - becoming the first British rider to stand on the World Championship podium since Peter Craven in 1962. Louis was part of the Great Britain Speedway World Team Cup winning team of 1972 and England's 1974 and 1975 winning teams.

Louis was also the British Champion in 1975 (Chris Louis would win the British Championship in 1998 and 2000 making them the first father-son to do so).

The following year, Louis was the World Pairs Champion in 1976 with Malcolm Simmons and finished sixth in his last World Final appearance in Poland. He also captained Ipswich to the British League title in 1975 and 1976 and the British League Pairs Championship with Billy Sanders during 1976 and 1977.

Louis won the British League Riders' Championship, held at Hyde Road on 20 October 1979. In 1981, Louis joined Halifax, spending two seasons at The Shay before signing for a season at King's Lynn in 1983.

== Retirement and death ==
Louis retired from riding in 1984 and became the promoter of the Ipswich Witches. He retired as the promoter of Ipswich in 2019.

Louis died in 5th April 2024, at the age of 82.

== World Final appearances ==
=== Individual World Championship ===
- 1972 – (England) London, Wembley Stadium – 5th – 11pts
- 1974 – (Sweden) Gothenburg, Ullevi – 4th – 9pts
- 1975 – (England) London, Wembley Stadium – 3rd – 12pts + 3pts
- 1976 – (Poland) Chorzów, Silesian Stadium – 6th – 9pts

=== World Pairs Championship ===
- 1975 – (Poland) Wrocław, Olympic Stadium (with Peter Collins) – 4th – 20pts (13)
- 1976 – (Sweden) Eskilstuna, Snälltorpet (with Malcolm Simmons) – Winner – 27pts (17)

=== World Team Cup ===
- 1972* – (West Germany) Olching, Olching Speedwaybahn (with Ivan Mauger / Ray Wilson / Terry Betts) Winner – 36pts (9)
- 1974 – (Poland) Chorzów, Silesian Stadium (with Peter Collins / Malcolm Simmons / Dave Jessup) Winner – 42pts (12)
- 1975 – (West Germany) Norden, Motodrom Halbemond (with Malcolm Simmons / Martin Ashby / Peter Collins) – Winner – 41pts (8)

* 1972 for Great Britain. All others for England.
