= Aleksandr Pavlov (speedway rider) =

Soviet Union motorcycle speedway rider

- Born: Soviet Union
- Nationality: Russian

Career history

Soviet Union
- 1969–1970: Vladivostok

Individual honours
- 1972, 1973: Speedway World Championship finalist
- 1969, 1970: Russian championship silver

Team honours
- 1973: World Team Cup bronze

Aleksandr Pavlov (born 1962) is a former international speedway rider from the Soviet Union.

== Speedway career ==
Pavlov reached the final of the Speedway World Championship in the 1972 Individual Speedway World Championship and the 1973 Individual Speedway World Championship. He was one of six Russians that competed in the 1972 World final after strong performances in the Continental final and European final.

Pavlov twice won the silver medal at the Russian national championship in 1969 and 1970.

== World final appearances ==
=== Individual World Championship ===
- 1972 – (England) London, Wembley Stadium – 6th – 8pts
- 1973 – (Poland) Chorzów, Silesian Stadium – 13th – 4 pts

=== World Team Cup ===
- 1973 - (England) London, Wembley Stadium (with Vladimir Paznikov / Valery Gordeev / Viktor Trofimov / Grigory Khlinovsky) - 3rd - 20pts (7)
