= Halbemond =

- Municipality
- Flag Coat of arms

- Location of Halbemond within Aurich district
- Interactive map of Halbemond
- Location within Germany Location within Lower Saxony
- Coordinates: 53°34′N 07°16′E
- Country: Germany
- State: Lower Saxony
- District: Aurich
- Municipal assoc.: Hage

Government
  - Mayor: Hermann Gronewold (SPD)

Area
  - Total: 6.55 km^{2} (2.53 sq mi)
- Elevation: 1 m (3.3 ft)

Population (2025-12-31)
  - Total: 992
  - Density: 151/km^{2} (392/sq mi)
- Time zone: UTC+01:00 (CET)
  - Summer (DST): UTC+02:00 (CEST)
- Postal codes: 26524
- Dialling codes: 0 49 36
- Vehicle registration: AUR

Halbemond is a municipality in the district of Aurich, in Lower Saxony, Germany. It is home to the Motodrom Halbemond, one of Europe's largest speedway stadiums.
