= Viktor Kalmykov =

Soviet speedway rider

- Born: Soviet Union
- Nationality: Soviet/Russian

Career history

Soviet Union
- 1966–1977: Balakovo

Individual honours
- 1972: Speedway World Championship finalist
- 1977: Russian championship silver

Viktor Kalmykov is a former international speedway rider from the Soviet Union.

== Speedway career ==
Kalmykov reached the final of the Speedway World Championship in the 1972 Individual Speedway World Championship. He was one of six Russians that competed in the 1972 World final after strong performances in the Continental final and European final.

Kalmykov won the silver medal in the Russian national championship in 1977.

== World final appearances ==
=== Individual World Championship ===
- 1972 – (England) London, Wembley Stadium – 11th – 6pts

=== World Team Cup ===
- 1972 - (West Germany) Olching, (with Viktor Trofimov / Grigory Khlinovsky / Anatoly Kuzmin) - 2nd - 21 + 7pts (5 + 3)
- 1974 - (Poland) Chorzów, Stadion Śląski, Chorzów (with Valery Gordeev / Mikhail Krasnov / Anatoly Kuzmin) - 4th - 10pts
