= Jan Simensen =

Swedish speedway rider

- Born: 26 July 1944 (age 82); Lammhult, Sweden
- Nationality: Swedish

Career history

Sweden
- 1964-1965, 1973-1977: Dackarna
- 1966: Masarna
- 1967-1972: Lejonen

Great Britain
- 1970: Cradley Heathens
- 1971-1972: Coventry Bees
- 1972: Wolverhampton Wolves

Individual honours
- 1972: Speedway World Championship finalist

Team honours
- 1968: Allsvenskan Div 2 Champion
- 1971: Midland Cup

Jan Simensen (born 26 July 1944) is a former motorcycle speedway rider from Sweden. He earned 25 caps for the Sweden national speedway team.

== Speedway career ==
Simensen rode in the top tier of British Speedway from 1970 until 1972, riding for Cradley Heathens, Coventry Bees and Wolverhampton Wolves.

Simensen competed in the final of the Speedway World Championship in the 1972 Individual Speedway World Championship.

== World Final appearances ==
=== Individual World Championship ===
- 1972 - (England) London, Wembley Stadium - Reserve - 2pts

=== World Team Cup ===
- 1972 - (West Germany) Olching, Olching Speedwaybahn (with Tommy Jansson / Anders Michanek / Christer Lofqvist / Göte Nordin) 4th - 18pts (3)
