= Valery Gordeev =

Soviet speedway rider

- Born: 28 August 1952 (age 74); Balakovo, Soviet Union
- Nationality: Soviet

Career history

Soviet Union
- 1970–1989: Balakovo

Individual honours
- 1975, 1977, 1978 1986, 1987: Soviet Champion
- 1971, 1977: Russian Champion
- 1973: Continental champion
- 1971, 1972, 1973, 1975, 1976: Speedway World Championship finalist

Team honours
- 1973: World Team Cup bronze

Valery Dmitrievich Gordeev (born 28 August 1952 in Balakovo, Soviet Union) is a former Soviet international motorcycle speedway rider.

== Career ==
Gordeev reached the finals of the Speedway World Championship five times in 1971, 1972, 1973, 1975 and 1976. He also won the Continental Speedway final in 1973.

Gordeev won the Soviet Championship on five occasions in 1975, 1977, 1978, 1986 and 1987 and the Russian Championship twice, in 1971 and 1977.

In 1973, Gordeev was part of the Soviet team that secured the bronze medal at the 1973 Speedway World Team Cup.

In 1977, Cradley Heathens made an attempt to sign the Gordeev brothers but despite the difficulties involved in gaining clearance to race in England.

== Family ==
Gordeev's older brother Vladimir is also a former rider who reached the World Final on three occasions.

== World Final appearances ==
=== Individual World Championship ===
- 1972 - (England) London, Wembley Stadium - 16th - 2pts
- 1973 - (Poland) Chorzów, Silesian Stadium - 8th - 7pts
- 1975 - (England) London, Wembley Stadium - 13th - 4pts
- 1976 - (Poland) Chorzów, Silesian Stadium - 15th - 1pt

=== World Team Cup ===
- 1973 - (England) London, Wembley Stadium (with Vladimir Paznikov / Grigory Khlinovsky / Viktor Trofimov / Aleksandr Pavlov) - 3rd - 20pts (7)
- 1974 - (Poland) , Chorzów, Silesian Stadium (with Vladimir Paznikov / Mikhail Krasnov / Viktor Kalmykov / Anatoly Kuzmin) - 4th - 10pts (4)
- 1975 – (West Germany) Norden, Motodrom Halbemond (with Vladimir Gordeev / Grigory Khlinovsky / Viktor Trofimov) – 2nd – 29pts (8)
- 1976 - (England) London, White City Stadium (with Viktor Trofimov / Grigory Khlinovsky / Vladimir Gordeev / Vladimir Paznikov) - 4th - 11pts (5)
- 1981 - (West Germany) Olching, Speedway Stadion Olching (with Mikhail Starostin / Viktor Kuznetsov / Nikolay Kornev / Anatoly Maksimov) - 4th - 3pts (0)
