= Grigory Khlinovsky =

Soviet speedway rider (born 1947)

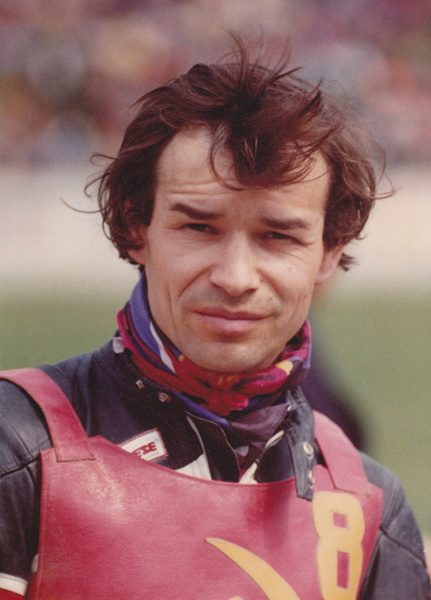
- Born: 11 November 1947 (age 79); Rivne, Soviet Union
- Nationality: Soviet / Ukrainian

Individual honours
- 1972, 1973, 1974: Speedway World Championship finalist

Team honours
- 1971, 1972: World Team Cup silver
- 1973: World Team Cup bronze

Grigory Alexandrovich Khlinovsky (born 11 November 1947) is a Ukrainian former international motorcycle speedway rider. He represented the Soviet Union.

== Speedway career ==
Khlinovsky reached the final of the Speedway World Championship on three consecutive years, in the 1972 Individual Speedway World Championship,< 1973 Individual Speedway World Championship and the 1974 Individual Speedway World Championship. He was one of six Russians that competed in the 1972 World final after strong performances in the Continental final and European final.

In 1971, Khlinovsky was part of the Soviet team that secured the silver medal at the 1971 Speedway World Team Cup and a bronze at the 1973 Speedway World Team Cup. He also competed in the 1974 world pairs final.

Khlinovsky was the senior coach of "Signal" team (Rivne) (1982-1989). Under his leadership "Signal" became the champion of the USSR for three times in a row (1985-1987). He was the senior coach of KAMAZ (Rivne) in 1990 and Signal (Rivne) in 1991. He is the honored coach of Ukraine, referee of the national category.

== World final appearances ==
=== Individual World Championship ===
- 1972 – (England) London, Wembley Stadium – 13th – 4pts
- 1973 – (Poland) Chorzów, Silesian Stadium – 5th – 10pts
- 1974 – (Sweden) Gothenburg, Ullevi – 10th – 6pts

=== World Pairs Championship ===
- 1974 – (England) Manchester, Hyde Road (with Vladimir Gordeev) – 6th – 10pts

=== World Team Cup ===
- 1971 - (Poland) Wrocław, Olympic Stadium (with Vladimir Smirnov / Vladimir Gordeev / Viktor Trofimov / Anatoly Kuzmin) - 2nd - 22pts (8)
- 1972 - (Germany) Olching, (with Anatoly Kuzmin / Viktor Trofimov / Viktor Kalmykov) - 2nd - 21 + 7 pts (5 + 1)
- 1973 - (England) London, Wembley Stadium (with Vladimir Paznikov / Valery Gordeev / Viktor Trofimov / Aleksandr Pavlov) - 3rd - 20pts (7)
- 1976 - (England) London, White City Stadium (with Viktor Trofimov / Valery Gordeev / Vladimir Gordeev / Vladimir Paznikov) - 4th - 11pts (2)
