= Ray Wilson (speedway rider) =

British motorcycle speedway rider

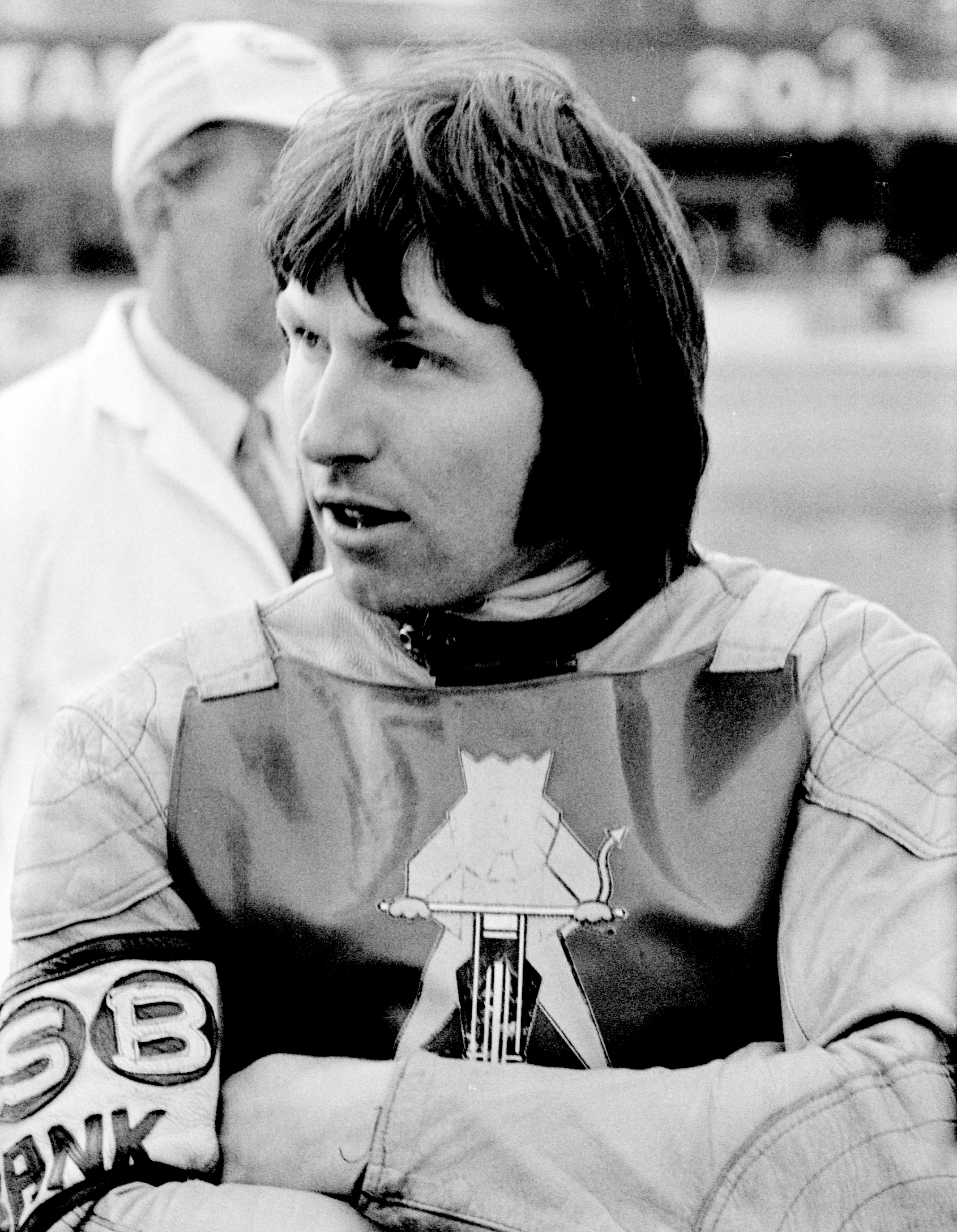
- Born: 12 March 1947 (age 79); Merton, Surrey, England
- Nationality: British (English)

Career history
- 1963–1967: Long Eaton Archers
- 1968–1976: Leicester Lions
- 1977–1979: Birmingham Brummies

Individual honours
- 1973: British Champion
- 1972: Blue Riband
- 1969: Brandonapolis

Team honours
- 1971, 1972, 1973, 1974: World Team Cup winner
- 1972: World Pairs champion
- 1972, 1974: Midland Cup

Raymond Wilson (born 12 March 1947) is a British former international motorcycle speedway rider. He was World Pairs Champion in 1972 and British Speedway Champion in 1973, and was also England Team Captain for five years in the early 1970s. He was the first Englishman to record a maximum score in a World Team Cup Final. He earned 72 international caps for the England national speedway team and 36 caps for the Great Britain team.

== Domestic career ==
Wilson was born on 12 March 1947 in Merton, Surrey, England. He was born to a speedway family because his father Ron Wilson was a speedway rider for Leicester and Oxford in the early 1950s.competed in cycle speedway for Leicester Monarchs before following his father into a career in motorcycle speedway. He first rode at Leicester Stadium in 1962 after a league meeting and after occasional visits to the training track at Rye House and further second-half rides at Long Eaton in 1963, made his competitive debut in 1963 for Long Eaton Archers, coming in as an emergency replacement against Stoke Potters. He was included in the Archers team in 1964, although the season was interrupted by a broken leg. In 1965, he rode with the Archers in the new British League, and in 1966 he rode in every league match for the Archers, finishing the season with an average of 8.6. He then raced in Australia over the Winter and in 1967, his performances improved again, averaging 10.36 per match. He also reached the British Final, scoring ten points and qualifying for the World Final, where he finished in eighth place.

Wilson followed the Long Eaton promotion when they moved to Leicester to open the Leicester Lions. He stayed with the Lions for nine seasons, scoring over four thousand points (including bonus points) and earned a testimonial in 1974. He toured Australia with England for the test series in the winter of 1969. For the final three seasons of his career he joined the Birmingham Brummies.

Outside speedway, Wilson ran his own haulage company.

Wilson is currently enjoying the role of Ambassador to his home town team, Leicester.

== International career ==
Wilson first rode for England in 1966 against Scotland, and in 1967 rode in test matches against Sweden and Poland. He was part of England's line-up for the 1967 World Team Cup, becoming the youngest Englishman to feature in a World Team Cup final at the age of 20, and was part of the England team that toured Australia in 1967/8.

1967 also saw Wilson appear in his first of four World Championship finals. In 1970, he was captain of Leicester and was a regularly represented his nation.

In 1972, Wilson became World Pairs Champion with partner Terry Betts.

Wilson captained Great Britain when they won the World Team Cup in 1973, and was also a member of the winning teams in 1971, 1972 and 1974 (the latter for England). His maximum score in 1971 led to him gaining the nickname "World Cup Willy".

== World Final appearances ==
=== Individual World Championship ===
- 1967 – (England) London, Wembley Stadium - 8th - 7pts
- 1971 – (Sweden) Gothenburg, Ullevi - 4th - 11pts
- 1973 – (Poland) Chorzów, Silesian Stadium - 14th - 5pts
- 1975 – (England) London, Wembley Stadium

=== World Pairs Championship ===
- 1968* – (West Germany) Illerstadion, Kempten (with Geoff Mudge) - 2nd - 21pts (9)
- 1972 – (Sweden) Ryavallen, Borås (with Terry Betts) - Winner - 24pts (15+3)

* Unofficial World Championships.

=== World Team Cup ===
- 1967* – (Sweden) Malmö, Malmö Stadion (with Eric Boocock / Barry Briggs / Ivan Mauger / Colin Pratt) - 3rd= - 19pts (4)
- 1970* – (England) London, Wembley Stadium (with Ivan Mauger / Barry Briggs / Nigel Boocock / Eric Boocock) - 2nd - 31pts (4)
- 1971* – (Poland) Wrocław, Olympic Stadium (with Jim Airey / Ivan Mauger / Barry Briggs / Ronnie Moore) - Winner - 37pts (12)
- 1972* – (West Germany) Olching, Olching Speedwaybahn (with Ivan Mauger / Terry Betts / John Louis) - Winner - 36pts (8)
- 1973* – (England) London, Wembley Stadium (with Malcolm Simmons / Peter Collins / Terry Betts) – Winner – 37pts (8)
- 1974 – (Poland) Chorzów, Silesian Stadium (with Peter Collins / John Louis / Dave Jessup / Malcolm Simmons) - Winner - 42pts (dnr)

* 1967–1973 for Great Britain. All others for England.
