= Peter Collins (speedway rider) =

British world champion motorcycle speedway rider

Peter Collins MBE
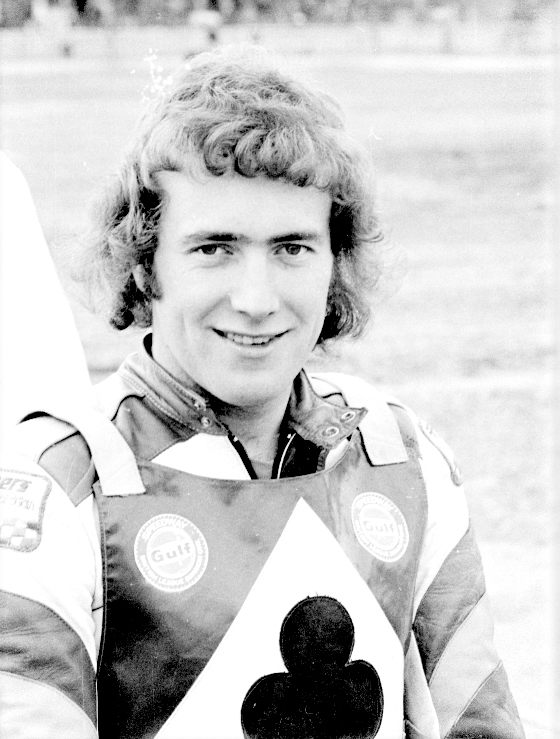
- Born: 24 March 1954 (age 72); Manchester, England
- Nationality: British (English)

Career history
- 1971: Rochdale Hornets
- 1971–1986: Belle Vue Aces

Individual honours
- 1976: World Champion
- 1979: British Champion
- 1974, 1975: British League Riders' Champion
- 1973: British Under-21 Champion
- 1974: European Final winner
- 1974, 1975, 1984: Northern Riders Champion
- 1974, 1978: Internationale
- 1974, 1975: Bass Yorkshire Open
- 1975, 1976, 1979: Silver Plume
- 1976: Pride of the East
- 1976: Olympique
- 1976: Daily Mirror Grand Prix
- 1976: Scottish Open Champion
- 1976, 1977: Intercontinental Champion
- 1974, 1977: Golden Sovereign
- 1976, 1979: Manpower Trophy
- 1976: Golden Gauntlets
- 1977: Skol Masters
- 1978: Superama

Team honours
- 1971, 1972, 1982: British League Champion
- 1972, 1973, 1975: British League KO Cup winner
- 1973, 1974, 1975, 1977, 1980: World Team Cup Winner
- 1977, 1980, 1983, 1984: World Pairs Champion
- 1984: British League Pairs Champion
- 1975, 1976, 1977, 1978: Northern Trophy
- 1983: British League Cup

Peter Spencer Collins MBE (born 24 March 1954) is an English former speedway rider who spent his whole career (1971–1986) with the Belle Vue Aces, the team he supported as a child.

During his career, Collins won ten World Championships in speedway competition (one Individual, four Pairs and five World Team Cups) making him the most successful British rider in history. At retirement, he had earned 118 international caps for the England national speedway team (a record) and nine caps for Great Britain.

== Early life ==
Collins was born on 24 March 1954 at the Davyhulme Hospital in Urmston, Manchester. He worked at a market garden while at school to save up for a bike, and spent two years as an apprentice fitter with Shell before leaving to concentrate on his speedway career.

== Career ==
=== Belle Vue Aces ===
In 1971, Collins rode for Belle Vue and the now defunct Rochdale Hornets on loan (Belle Vue's nursery team). He rode his first full season for the Aces in 1972 attaining an average of 8.44 in British League matches while still only eighteen years of age. In addition, the Aces won the league and cup double that year. He won the British League Riders' Championship in 1974 and 1975.

Collins won the British Speedway Championship in 1979.

=== World Individual championships ===
In 1973, Collins qualified for his first Speedway World Championship in Chorzów, Poland. He again qualified for the World Final in 1974 finishing in equal fourth place with a creditable nine points. He did however win the British League Riders Championship (BLRC) at Hyde Road. The 1975 World Final was held at Wembley but resulted in disappointment for Collins who again finished just off the podium. The 1976 final proved to be the highlight of his career however as he became World Champion with fourteen points in Katowice, Poland. In 1977 however, he was injured whilst riding at his home track, badly breaking his leg. He attempted to defend his title, in extreme pain and unable to walk without crutches; he narrowly missed out, finishing second.

=== World Pairs Championships ===
Collins won four World Pairs Championship titles during his career, all with different partners, whilst riding for Great Britain or England. The 1977 title was won on his home Belle Vue (Manchester) track with Malcolm Simmons. In 1980, he partnered Dave Jessup to victory in Krško, Yugoslavia. Yorkshireman Kenny Carter was his partner in Gothenburg in 1983 whilst he was paired up with fellow Mancunian Belle Vue Ace Chris Morton for his final pairs title in 1984 at Lonigo in Italy. He also finished second with Carter to the American pairing of Bobby Schwartz and Dennis Sigalos in the 1982 World Pairs Final in Sydney.

England's win in the 1983 World Pairs Final was considered lucky. Collins was lucky to be allowed to re-start Heat 10 against Denmark (Erik Gundersen and Hans Nielsen) after video replays suggested that he had simply mis-judged the slick Ullevi track going into the first turn after the start and had fallen causing the race to be stopped. With Collins luckily still in the race, the extra two points England gained as a result of their 5–0 win over the Danes (Nielsen had a tape exclusion on the re-run while Gundersen had an engine failure after comfortably leading for 2¾ laps) would prove crucial as England defeated Australian pair Billy Sanders and Gary Guglielmi by just one point to win the title. Ironically, later in the meeting Sanders (to that point undefeated on the day) had like Collins fallen on the slick track in turn 1 of their heat against the West Germans. Although he had let Collins re-start after falling, the FIM referee of the meeting, Australian Sam Bass, had no hesitation in excluding his fellow countryman from the re-run which was ultimately won by Guglielmi. With the West Germans out of form at Ullevi it was likely Australia would have scored a 5–1 result had Sanders not been excluded. Ultimately, both decisions by Bass helped England secure their record 6th World Pairs title.

=== World Team Cup ===
Collins was a five-time World Team Cup champion. His first title came with Great Britain in 1973 at Wembley just two weeks after his World Final debut in Poland. His four other wins came riding for England in 1974 (Wrocław, Poland), 1975 (Norden, West Germany), 1977 (Wrocław) and 1980 (Wrocław). He also finished second in 1978 (Landshut, West Germany), 1983 (Vojens, Denmark) and 1984 (Leszno, Poland).

== After Speedway ==
On his retirement, Collins became part of the team responsible for saving the club following the sale of the Hyde Road stadium, and taking the team back to their then original home on Kirkmanshulme Lane. He also became a respected television commentator with Sky Sports.

In November 2001, Collins was awarded an MBE for services to motorcycle racing.

== Family ==
Collins has four brothers all of whom were speedway riders, Les (who finished second behind Bruce Penhall in the 1982 World Final in Los Angeles), Phil, Neil and Stephen. With his wife Angela, he has a son and daughter. His son Chris and nephew Aidan were also riders but have both retired from the sport.

== World final appearances ==
=== Individual World Championship ===
- 1973 – (Poland) Chorzów, Silesian Stadium – 12th – 6pts
- 1974 – (Sweden) Gothenburg, Ullevi – 6th – 9pts
- 1975 – (England) London, Wembley Stadium – 5th – 10pts
- 1976 – (Poland) Chorzów, Silesian Stadium – Winner – 14pts
- 1977 – (Sweden) Gothenburg, Ullevi – 2nd – 13pts
- 1979 – (Poland) Chorzów, Silesian Stadium – 11th – 6pts
- 1980 – (Sweden) Gothenburg, Ullevi – 7th – 8pts
- 1982 – (United States) Los Angeles, Memorial Coliseum – 13th – 5pts

=== World Pairs Championship ===
- 1974 – (England) Manchester, Hyde Road (with Dave Jessup) – 4th – 20pts (12)
- 1975 – (Poland) Wrocław, Olympic Stadium (with John Louis) – 4th – 20pts (7)
- 1977 – (England) Manchester, Hyde Road (with Malcolm Simmons) – Winner – 28pts (15)
- 1980 – (Socialist Federal Republic of Yugoslavia) Krško, Matija Gubec Stadium (with Dave Jessup) – Winner – 29pts (14)
- 1982 – (Australia) Sydney, Liverpool City Raceway (with Kenny Carter) – 2nd – 22pts (15)
- 1983 – (Sweden) Gothenburg, Ullevi (with Kenny Carter) – Winner – 25pts (10)
- 1984 – (Italy) Lonigo, Santa Marina Stadium (with Chris Morton) – Winner – 27pts (13)

=== World Team Cup ===
- 1973* – (England) London, Wembley Stadium (with Malcolm Simmons / Ray Wilson / Terry Betts) – Winner – 37pts (12)
- 1974 – (Poland) Chorzów, Silesian Stadium (with John Louis / Dave Jessup / Malcolm Simmons) – Winner – 42pts (12)
- 1975 – (West Germany) Norden, Motodrom Halbemond (with Malcolm Simmons / Martin Ashby / John Louis) – Winner – 41pts (12)
- 1977 – (Poland) Wrocław, Olympic Stadium (with Malcolm Simmons / Michael Lee / Dave Jessup / John Davis) – Winner – 37pts (10)
- 1978 – (West Germany) Landshut, Stadion Ellermühle (with Malcolm Simmons / Dave Jessup / Michael Lee / Gordon Kennett) – 2nd – 27pts (6)
- 1980 – (Poland) Wrocław, Olympic Stadium (with Dave Jessup / Chris Morton / Michael Lee) – Winner – 40pts (10)
- 1983 – (Denmark) Vojens, Speedway Center (with Kenny Carter / Michael Lee / Dave Jessup / Chris Morton) – 2nd – 29pts (1)
- 1984 – (Poland) Leszno, Alfred Smoczyk Stadium (with Chris Morton / Simon Wigg / Phil Collins / Neil Collins) – 2nd – 24pts (2)

* 1973 for Great Britain. All others for England.

== World Longtrack ==
- 1974 (Germany) Scheeßel - 7th - 11pts
- 1975 (Socialist Federal Republic of Yugoslavia) Gornja Radgona - 9th - 11pts
- 1976 Did not compete
- 1977 Semi-final
- 1978 (Germany) Mühldorf - 3rd - 24pts
- 1979 (Czech Republic) Mariánské Lázně - 12th - 7pts
- 1980 (Germany) Scheeßel - 12th - 7pts
- 1981 (Socialist Federal Republic of Yugoslavia) Gornja Radgona - 9th - 10pts
- 1982 (Denmark) Esbjerg - 5th - 15pts
- 1983 Semi-final
- 1984 (Germany) Herxheim - 4th - 16pts
- 1985 (Denmark) Esbjerg - 3rd - 18pts
- 1986 (Germany) Pfarrkirchen - 2nd - 18pts
- 1987 Semi-final

== European Grasstrack Championship ==
=== Finals ===
1978 (England) Hereford - 8th - 15pts
