= Terry Betts =

British motorcycle speedway rider

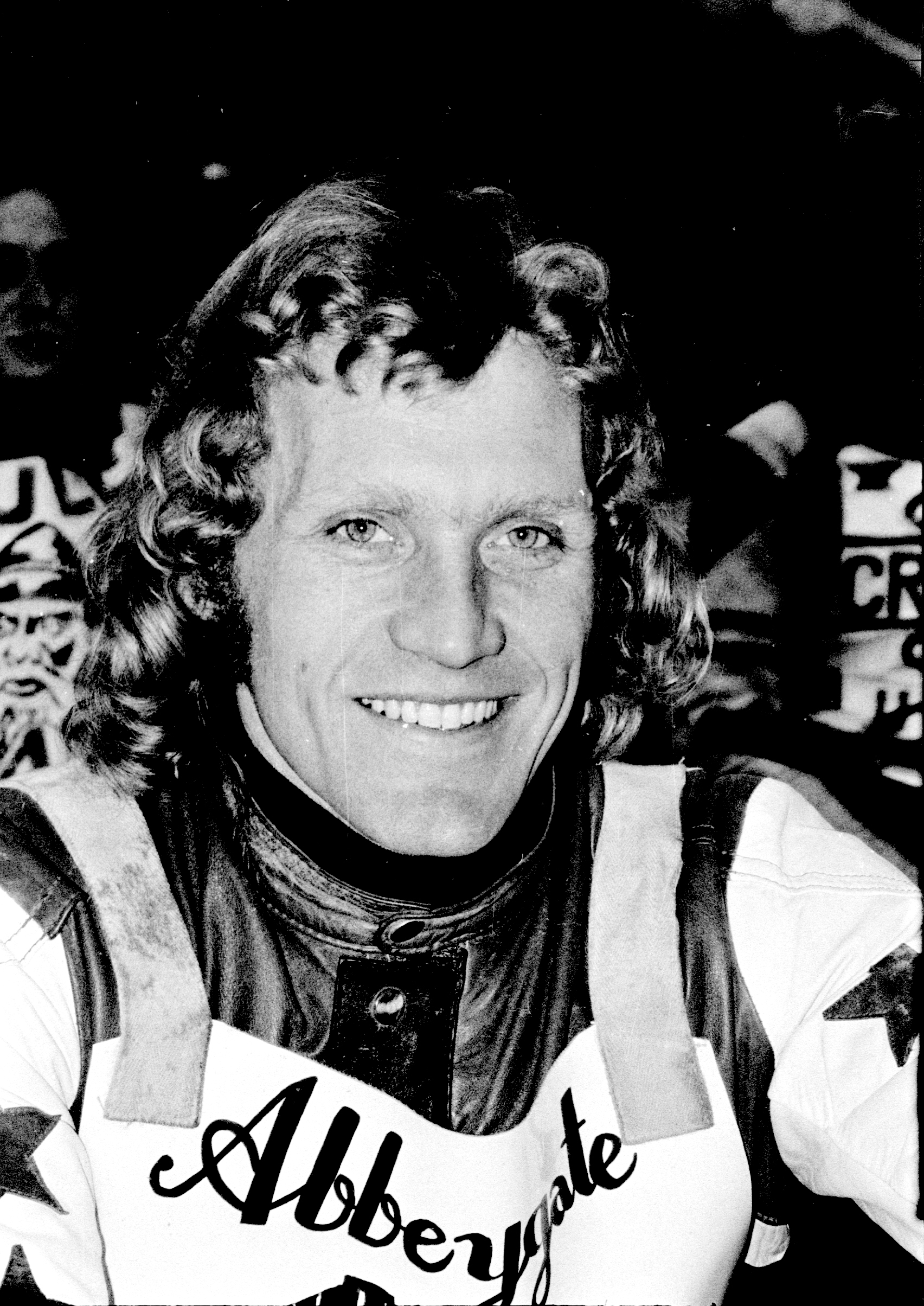
- Born: 15 September 1943 (age 83); Harlow, England
- Nationality: British (English)

Career history
- 1960–1963: Norwich Stars
- 1961: Wolverhampton Wolves
- 1965: Long Eaton Archers
- 1966–1978: King's Lynn Stars
- 1979: Reading Racers

Individual honours
- 1970, 1971: Southern Riders Champion
- 1977: Littlechild Trophy

Team honours
- 1972, 1973: World Team Cup Winner
- 1972: World Pairs Champion
- 1977: British League KO Cup Winner
- 1963: National Trophy
- 1973: Spring Gold Cup Winner

Terence Arnold Betts (born 15 September 1943 in Harlow, Essex, England) is a former international speedway rider who reached the final of the Speedway World Championship in 1974. He became World Pairs Champion with Ray Wilson in 1972 and was a member of the Great Britain team that won the World Team Cup in 1972 and 1973.

== Career summary ==
Betts began his career with the Norwich Stars in 1960 but joined the King's Lynn Stars in 1965 after the closure of Norwich. He remained there for the majority of his career, spending one season with Reading Racers before he retired on the eve of the 1980 season. He was awarded a testimonial meeting in 1975 after ten years of continuous service to the club. Betts was a regular England international.

At retirement, Betts had earned 55 international caps for England national speedway team and 19 caps for Great Britain.

In 2005, Betts was voted as the greatest King's Lynn Stars rider of all time by the club's fans.

== World Final Appearances ==
=== Individual World Championship ===
- 1974 - (Sweden) Gothenburg, Ullevi - 12th - 6pts

=== World Pairs Championship ===
- 1972 - (Sweden) Borås (with Ray Wilson) - Winner - 24pts (9)

=== World Team Cup ===
- 1966 - (Poland) Wrocław, Olympic Stadium (with Barry Briggs / Nigel Boocock / Ivan Mauger / Colin Pratt) - 4th - 8pts (0)
- 1972 - (West Germany) Olching, Olching Speedwaybahn (with Ivan Mauger / Ray Wilson / John Louis) Winner - 36pts (8)
- 1973 - (England) London, Wembley Stadium (with Malcolm Simmons / Ray Wilson / Peter Collins) – Winner – 37pts (9)
