= Dave Gifford =

British/New Zealander motorcycle speedway rider

- Born: 18 April 1944 (age 82); Herne Bay, England
- Nickname: Giffy
- Nationality: New Zealander/British

Career history
- 1965–1970: Newcastle Diamonds
- 1972–1973: Wolverhampton Wolves
- 1973–1974: Coatbridge Tigers
- 1974: Hull Vikings
- 1975–1978: Berwick Bandits

David John Gifford (born 18 April 1944) is a former international motorcycle speedway rider from New Zealand and Great Britain. He earned 19 international caps for the New Zealand national speedway team and two caps for the Great Britain national speedway team.

== Biography ==
Gifford was born in Herne Bay but emigrated to New Zealand in 1953. He arrived back in the United Kingdom in 1965, with fellow rider Rim Malskaitis and began his British leagues career riding for Newcastle Diamonds during the 1965 British League season.

Gifford raced for Newcastle from 1965 to 1970, regularly riding alongside his teammate Ivan Mauger and eventually becoming the Newcastle captain. When Newcastle closed at the end of the 1970 British League season, he decided to spend 1971 racing in California.

Gifford returned to British speedway in 1972, joining his old boss Mike Parker at Wolverhampton Wolves but left during 1973 to join Coatbridge Tigers. He topped the Coatbridge Tigers averages in 1973.

In 1975, Gifford joined the Berwick Bandits where he spent his final four seasons in British speedway. After his speedway career he returned to New Zealand, where he restored old speedway bikes and exhibited bikes, memorabilia and trophies.
