= Bob Humphreys (speedway rider) =

Australian speedway rider

- Born: 7 January 1946 (age 80); Liverpool, New South Wales, Australia
- Nationality: Australian

Career history
- 1971–1974: King's Lynn Stars
- 1975–1979: Reading Racers
- 1978–1981: Milton Keynes Knights
- 1980–1981, 1984: Swindon Robins
- 1984–1985: Arena Essex Hammers

Team honours
- 1979: National League Pairs winner
- 1973, 1977: Spring Gold Cup winner

Robert Allen Humphreys (born 7 January 1946) is a former motorcycle speedway rider from Australia.

== Career ==
Humphreys started his British leagues career during the 1971 British League season, where he rode for King's Lynn Stars. He rode for King's Lynn for four years before signing for Reading Racers for the 1975 British League season.

With Reading, Humphreys completed five seasons from 1975 to 1979 and doubled up with Milton Keynes Knights in the National league. In 1978, he averaged an impressive 10.59. He won the National League Pairs, partnering Andy Grahame for Milton Keynes, during the 1979 National League season. Humphreys finished his career riding with Arena Essex Hammers.

Humphreys also earned 12 full caps for the Australia national speedway team.
