= Hyde Road (speedway) =

Stadium in Manchester, England

Coordinates: 53°27′50″N 2°11′41″W

Hyde Road Stadium, in Manchester, England, often referred to as Belle Vue was the home of the Belle Vue Aces speedway team. The stadium's capacity was 40,000 and it was built in 1928 and used until demolished in 1987. It was claimed, incorrectly, to have been the first purpose-built speedway track in Britain.

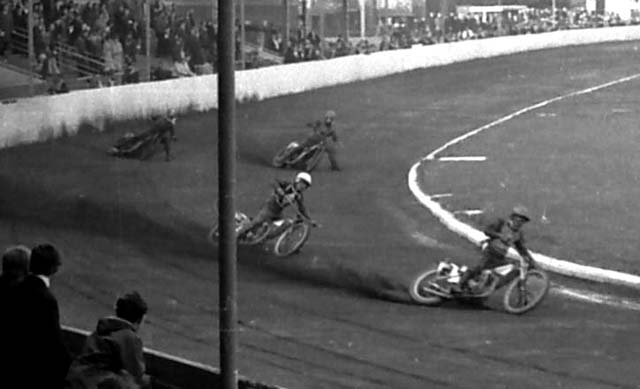
Belle Vue Aces in 1963

== History ==
Part of the complex of buildings and attractions that formed Belle Vue Zoological Gardens the Hyde Road stadium was originally constructed in 1886, as an athletics ground. It was named after Hyde Road, a road which begins at the east end of Ardwick Green South in Ardwick and runs east towards Hyde. At the boundary between Gorton and Denton it continues as Manchester Road.

In 1928, the owners of the gardens decided to convert the stadium for use as a speedway venue. It was already used at that time as a football ground for the Manchester Central F.C. The opening speedway meeting here was staged on 23 March 1929, when Arthur Franklyn won the Golden Helmet. Following the announcement that Stuart Bamforth had sold the stadium for redevelopment, the last speedway meeting was staged on 1 November 1987, when a double header took place. Firstly, Belle Vue narrowly defeated the Coventry Bees in a second leg replay of the League Cup Final, but lost the tie on aggregate, before losing to the Cradley Heath Heathens in the final league match ever raced at Hyde Road. Speedway returned to Belle Vue Greyhound stadium and remained there.

Some of the more famous riders who rode at Hyde Road, either for international meetings, as a Belle Vue Ace, or as a visiting team rider include Speedway World Champions Jack Young, Peter Craven, Ronnie Moore, Ove Fundin, Barry Briggs, Ivan Mauger, Ole Olsen, Peter Collins, Anders Michanek, Egon Müller, Michael Lee, Bruce Penhall, Erik Gundersen, and Hans Nielsen.

The speedway at Hyde Road was 382 metres (418 yards) in length.

The site of the old Hyde Road stadium is now the site of the British Car Auctions Ltd.

== Speedway World Finals ==
Hyde Road hosted the Final of the World Pairs Championship in 1974 and 1977.

=== World Pairs Championship ===
- 1974 - Sweden (Anders Michanek / Sören Sjösten) - 28pts
- 1977 - England (Peter Collins / Malcolm Simmons) - 28pts

== Other sports use ==
Several other sports used the ground including amateur soccer club, Manchester Central F.C., baseball, and the rugby league where Broughton Rangers crossed from Salford to play at Belle Vue from 1933 until the club's demise in 1955 having renamed as Belle Vue Rangers in 1946.
