= Motodrom Halbemond =

Stadium in Halbemond, Germany

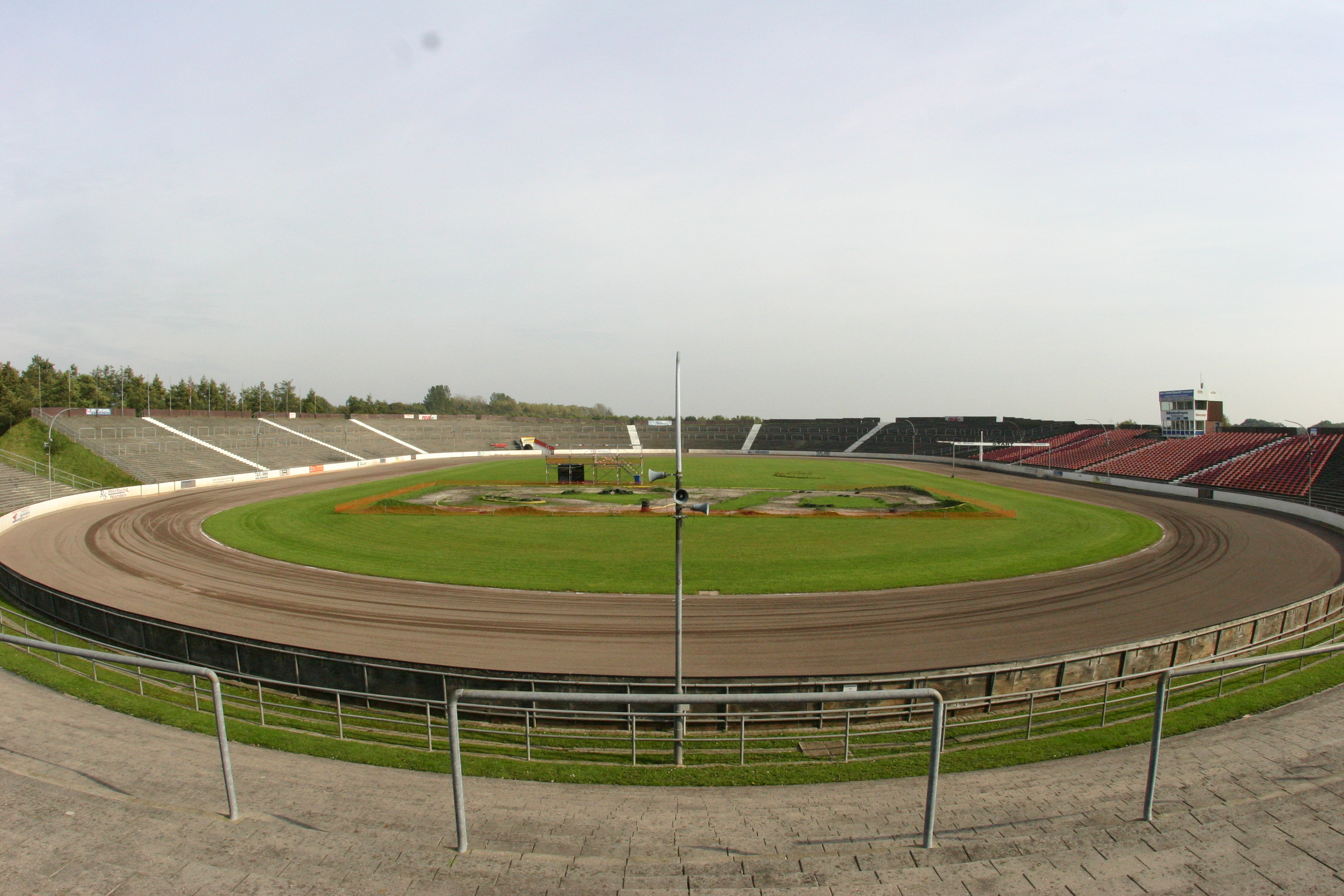
- The stadium in 2008
- Location: Nadörster Str. 27 26524 Halbemond, Germany
- Coordinates: 53°34′23″N 7°16′11″E
- Capacity: 34,000
- Opened: 1972
- Length: 0.396 km

The Motodrom Halbemond is a 34,000-capacity motorcycle speedway stadium in Halbemond, located about 5 kilometres southeast of Norden, Germany. There is a motocross course adjacent to the stadium directly east of the Motodrom. The venue is used by the speedway team MC Norden, who compete in the German Bundesliga.

== History ==
The Motodrom was first used as a sports facility in 1972. It hosted the final of the 1975 Speedway World Team Cup.

In 1983, the stadium underwent significant renovation in time to host the 1983 Individual Speedway World Championship. The final attracted a record 50,000 crowd and German rider Egon Müller became the world champion.

During the 1990s public interest in speedway in Germany waned, which resulted in the track lying idle for several years. Since the turn of the millennium, speedway has taken place regularly again, including international competitions and German Individual Speedway Championship events.

In 2010, the track hosted the 2010 Team Speedway Junior European Championship,
