= Czechoslovakia national speedway team =

Czechoslovakian national motorcycle speedway team

Czechoslovakia
- SWC Wins: 0 Best result World Cup silver medal (1963)

The Czechoslovakia national speedway team were one of the teams that competed in international team motorcycle speedway.

== History ==
The Czechoslovakian speedway team (which consisted predominantly of Czech Republic riders) competed in the inaugural Speedway World Team Cup during the 1960 Speedway World Team Cup and won the bronze medal after finishing third in the final. Throughout the history of World Team Cup, the team were regular World Cup contenders from 1960 until their final World Cup in 1992. They reached the final on fourteen occasions, winning the silver medal in 1963 and two more bronze medals in 1977 and 1979.

In addition to the four medals at the World Cup, the team won a bronze medal at the Speedway World Pairs Championship. The pair of Antonín Kasper Jr. and Roman Matoušek won the medal at the 1986 Speedway World Pairs Championship.

Following the Dissolution of Czechoslovakia at the end of 1992, the riders then competed for their new speedway nations of the Czech Republic and Slovakia.

== Major world finals ==
=== World team Cup ===
| Year | Venue | Standings (Pts) | Riders | Pts |
|---|---|---|---|---|
| 1960 | (Sweden); Göteborg; Ullevi | 1. Sweden (44); 2. England (30); 3. Czechoslovakia (15); 4. Poland (7) | Antonín Kasper Sr. | 5 |
| 1960 | (Sweden); Göteborg; Ullevi | 1. Sweden (44); 2. England (30); 3. Czechoslovakia (15); 4. Poland (7) | Luboš Tomíček Sr. | 4 |
| 1960 | (Sweden); Göteborg; Ullevi | 1. Sweden (44); 2. England (30); 3. Czechoslovakia (15); 4. Poland (7) | Jaroslav Machač | 3 |
| 1960 | (Sweden); Göteborg; Ullevi | 1. Sweden (44); 2. England (30); 3. Czechoslovakia (15); 4. Poland (7) | František Richter | 3 |
| 1961 | (Poland); Wrocław; Stadion Olimpijski | 1. Poland (32); 2. Sweden (31); 3. England (21); 4. Czechoslovakia (12) | Luboš Tomíček Sr. | 7 |
| 1961 | (Poland); Wrocław; Stadion Olimpijski | 1. Poland (32); 2. Sweden (31); 3. England (21); 4. Czechoslovakia (12) | Antonín Kasper Sr. | 4 |
| 1961 | (Poland); Wrocław; Stadion Olimpijski | 1. Poland (32); 2. Sweden (31); 3. England (21); 4. Czechoslovakia (12) | Bohumír Bartoněk | 1 |
| 1961 | (Poland); Wrocław; Stadion Olimpijski | 1. Poland (32); 2. Sweden (31); 3. England (21); 4. Czechoslovakia (12) | Stanislav Svoboda | 0 |
| 1962 | (Czech Republic); Slaný; Slaný Speedway | 1. Sweden (36); 2. (United Kingdom) Great Britain (24); 3. Poland (20); 4. Czechoslovakia (16) | Luboš Tomíček Sr. | 7 |
| 1962 | (Czech Republic); Slaný; Slaný Speedway | 1. Sweden (36); 2. (United Kingdom) Great Britain (24); 3. Poland (20); 4. Czechoslovakia (16) | Bedřich Slaný | 4 |
| 1962 | (Czech Republic); Slaný; Slaný Speedway | 1. Sweden (36); 2. (United Kingdom) Great Britain (24); 3. Poland (20); 4. Czechoslovakia (16) | Jaroslav Volf | 3 |
| 1962 | (Czech Republic); Slaný; Slaný Speedway | 1. Sweden (36); 2. (United Kingdom) Great Britain (24); 3. Poland (20); 4. Czechoslovakia (16) | Karel Průša | 2 |
| 1962 | (Czech Republic); Slaný; Slaný Speedway | 1. Sweden (36); 2. (United Kingdom) Great Britain (24); 3. Poland (20); 4. Czechoslovakia (16) | Bohumír Bartoněk | 0 |
| 1963 | (Austria); Vienna; Stadion Wien | 1. Sweden (37); 2. Czechoslovakia (27); 3. (United Kingdom) Great Britain (25); 4. Poland (7) | Antonín Kasper Sr. | 10 |
| 1963 | (Austria); Vienna; Stadion Wien | 1. Sweden (37); 2. Czechoslovakia (27); 3. (United Kingdom) Great Britain (25); 4. Poland (7) | Stanislav Kubíček | 7 |
| 1963 | (Austria); Vienna; Stadion Wien | 1. Sweden (37); 2. Czechoslovakia (27); 3. (United Kingdom) Great Britain (25); 4. Poland (7) | Miroslav Šmíd | 7 |
| 1963 | (Austria); Vienna; Stadion Wien | 1. Sweden (37); 2. Czechoslovakia (27); 3. (United Kingdom) Great Britain (25); 4. Poland (7) | Luboš Tomíček Sr. | 5 |
| 1968 | (England); London; Wembley | 1. (United Kingdom) Great Britain (40); 2. Sweden (30); 3. Poland (19); 4. Czechoslovakia (7) | Antonín Kasper Sr. | 3 |
| 1968 | (England); London; Wembley | 1. (United Kingdom) Great Britain (40); 2. Sweden (30); 3. Poland (19); 4. Czechoslovakia (7) | Luboš Tomíček Sr. | 2 |
| 1968 | (England); London; Wembley | 1. (United Kingdom) Great Britain (40); 2. Sweden (30); 3. Poland (19); 4. Czechoslovakia (7) | Jaroslav Volf | 1 |
| 1968 | (England); London; Wembley | 1. (United Kingdom) Great Britain (40); 2. Sweden (30); 3. Poland (19); 4. Czechoslovakia (7) | Jan Holub I | 1 |
| 1970 | (England); London; Wembley | 1. Sweden (42); 2. (United Kingdom) Great Britain (31); 3. Poland (20); 4. Czechoslovakia (3) | Václav Verner | 3 |
| 1970 | (England); London; Wembley | 1. Sweden (42); 2. (United Kingdom) Great Britain (31); 3. Poland (20); 4. Czechoslovakia (3) | Jiří Štancl | 0 |
| 1970 | (England); London; Wembley | 1. Sweden (42); 2. (United Kingdom) Great Britain (31); 3. Poland (20); 4. Czechoslovakia (3) | Miloslav Verner | 0 |
| 1970 | (England); London; Wembley | 1. Sweden (42); 2. (United Kingdom) Great Britain (31); 3. Poland (20); 4. Czechoslovakia (3) | Luboš Tomíček Sr. | 0 |
| 1970 | (England); London; Wembley | 1. Sweden (42); 2. (United Kingdom) Great Britain (31); 3. Poland (20); 4. Czechoslovakia (3) | Jan Holub I | 0 |
| 1970 | (England); London; Wembley | 1. Sweden (42); 2. (United Kingdom) Great Britain (31); 3. Poland (20); 4. Czechoslovakia (3) | Zdeněk Majstr | 0 |
| 1977 | (Poland); Wrocław; Stadion Olimpijski | 1. England (37); 2. Poland (25); 3. Czechoslovakia (23); 4. Sweden (11) | Jiří Štancl | 8 |
| 1977 | (Poland); Wrocław; Stadion Olimpijski | 1. England (37); 2. Poland (25); 3. Czechoslovakia (23); 4. Sweden (11) | Václav Verner | 5 |
| 1977 | (Poland); Wrocław; Stadion Olimpijski | 1. England (37); 2. Poland (25); 3. Czechoslovakia (23); 4. Sweden (11) | Jan Verner | 5 |
| 1977 | (Poland); Wrocław; Stadion Olimpijski | 1. England (37); 2. Poland (25); 3. Czechoslovakia (23); 4. Sweden (11) | Aleš Dryml Sr. | 5 |
| 1978 | (West Germany); Landshut; Stadion Ellermühle | 1. Denmark (37); 2. England (27); 3. Poland (19); (Czech Republic) Czechoslovakia (18) | Jiří Štancl | 9 |
| 1978 | (West Germany); Landshut; Stadion Ellermühle | 1. Denmark (37); 2. England (27); 3. Poland (19); (Czech Republic) Czechoslovakia (18) | Jan Verner | 5 |
| 1978 | (West Germany); Landshut; Stadion Ellermühle | 1. Denmark (37); 2. England (27); 3. Poland (19); (Czech Republic) Czechoslovakia (18) | Aleš Dryml Sr. | 2 |
| 1978 | (West Germany); Landshut; Stadion Ellermühle | 1. Denmark (37); 2. England (27); 3. Poland (19); (Czech Republic) Czechoslovakia (18) | Václav Verner | 2 |
| 1979 | (England); London; White City Stadium | 1. New Zealand (35); 2. Denmark (31); 3. Czechoslovakia (19); 4. Poland (11) | Jiří Štancl | 6 |
| 1979 | (England); London; White City Stadium | 1. New Zealand (35); 2. Denmark (31); 3. Czechoslovakia (19); 4. Poland (11) | Aleš Dryml Sr. | 5 |
| 1979 | (England); London; White City Stadium | 1. New Zealand (35); 2. Denmark (31); 3. Czechoslovakia (19); 4. Poland (11) | Zdeněk Kudrna | 4 |
| 1979 | (England); London; White City Stadium | 1. New Zealand (35); 2. Denmark (31); 3. Czechoslovakia (19); 4. Poland (11) | Václav Verner | 4 |
| 1980 | (Poland); Wrocław; Stadion Olimpijski | 1. England (40); 2. United States (29); 3. Poland (15); 4. Czechoslovakia (12) | Jiří Štancl | 4 |
| 1980 | (Poland); Wrocław; Stadion Olimpijski | 1. England (40); 2. United States (29); 3. Poland (15); 4. Czechoslovakia (12) | Petr Ondrašík | 3 |
| 1980 | (Poland); Wrocław; Stadion Olimpijski | 1. England (40); 2. United States (29); 3. Poland (15); 4. Czechoslovakia (12) | Václav Verner | 3 |
| 1980 | (Poland); Wrocław; Stadion Olimpijski | 1. England (40); 2. United States (29); 3. Poland (15); 4. Czechoslovakia (12) | Aleš Dryml Sr. | 1 |
| 1980 | (Poland); Wrocław; Stadion Olimpijski | 1. England (40); 2. United States (29); 3. Poland (15); 4. Czechoslovakia (12) | Zdeněk Kudrna | 1 |
| 1982 | (England); London; White City Stadium | 1. United States (37); 2. Denmark (24); 3. West Germany (18); 4. Czechoslovakia (17) | Aleš Dryml Sr. | 7 |
| 1982 | (England); London; White City Stadium | 1. United States (37); 2. Denmark (24); 3. West Germany (18); 4. Czechoslovakia (17) | Václav Verner | 6 |
| 1982 | (England); London; White City Stadium | 1. United States (37); 2. Denmark (24); 3. West Germany (18); 4. Czechoslovakia (17) | Jiří Štancl | 4 |
| 1982 | (England); London; White City Stadium | 1. United States (37); 2. Denmark (24); 3. West Germany (18); 4. Czechoslovakia (17) | Petr Ondrašík | 0 |
| 1982 | (England); London; White City Stadium | 1. United States (37); 2. Denmark (24); 3. West Germany (18); 4. Czechoslovakia (17) | Antonín Kasper Jr. | 0 |
| 1983 | (Denmark); Vojens; Vojens Speedway Center | 1. Denmark (37); 2. England (29); 3. United States (27); 4. Czechoslovakia (3) | Jiří Štancl | 2 |
| 1983 | (Denmark); Vojens; Vojens Speedway Center | 1. Denmark (37); 2. England (29); 3. United States (27); 4. Czechoslovakia (3) | Václav Verner | 1 |
| 1983 | (Denmark); Vojens; Vojens Speedway Center | 1. Denmark (37); 2. England (29); 3. United States (27); 4. Czechoslovakia (3) | Antonín Kasper Jr. | 0 |
| 1983 | (Denmark); Vojens; Vojens Speedway Center | 1. Denmark (37); 2. England (29); 3. United States (27); 4. Czechoslovakia (3) | Aleš Dryml Sr. | 0 |
| 1983 | (Denmark); Vojens; Vojens Speedway Center | 1. Denmark (37); 2. England (29); 3. United States (27); 4. Czechoslovakia (3) | Petr Ondrašík | 0 |
| 1987 | Prague; Markéta Stadium | 1. Denmark (46); 2. England (31); 3. United States (26); 4. Czechoslovakia (17) | Roman Matoušek | 9 |
| 1987 | Prague; Markéta Stadium | 1. Denmark (46); 2. England (31); 3. United States (26); 4. Czechoslovakia (17) | Zdeněk Schneiderwind | 3 |
| 1987 | Prague; Markéta Stadium | 1. Denmark (46); 2. England (31); 3. United States (26); 4. Czechoslovakia (17) | Antonín Kasper Jr. | 3 |
| 1987 | Prague; Markéta Stadium | 1. Denmark (46); 2. England (31); 3. United States (26); 4. Czechoslovakia (17) | Petr Vandírek | 2 |
| 1987 | Prague; Markéta Stadium | 1. Denmark (46); 2. England (31); 3. United States (26); 4. Czechoslovakia (17) | Lubomír Jedek | 0 |
| 1990 | (Czechoslovakia); Pardubice; Svítkov Stadion | 1. United States (37); 2. England (34); 3. Denmark (30); 4. Czechoslovakia (19) | Zdeněk Tesař | 6 |
| 1990 | (Czechoslovakia); Pardubice; Svítkov Stadion | 1. United States (37); 2. England (34); 3. Denmark (30); 4. Czechoslovakia (19) | Bohumil Brhel | 6 |
| 1990 | (Czechoslovakia); Pardubice; Svítkov Stadion | 1. United States (37); 2. England (34); 3. Denmark (30); 4. Czechoslovakia (19) | Roman Matoušek | 3 |
| 1990 | (Czechoslovakia); Pardubice; Svítkov Stadion | 1. United States (37); 2. England (34); 3. Denmark (30); 4. Czechoslovakia (19) | Antonín Kasper Jr. | 3 |
| 1990 | (Czechoslovakia); Pardubice; Svítkov Stadion | 1. United States (37); 2. England (34); 3. Denmark (30); 4. Czechoslovakia (19) | Vladimír Kalina | 1 |

=== World Pairs finals ===
- 1969 (5th)
- 1970 (5th)
- 1971 (4th)
- 1972 (6th)
- 1973 (6th)
- 1974 (7th)
- 1977 (4th)
- 1978 (4th)
- 1981 (4th)
- 1982 (7th)
- 1984 (6th)
- 1986 (bronze)
- 1987 (5th)
- 1989 (7th)
- 1990 (4th)
- 1991 (5th)

== International caps ==
Since the advent of the Speedway Grand Prix era, international caps earned by riders is largely restricted to international competitions, whereas previously test matches between two teams were a regular occurrence.

| Rider | Caps |
|---|---|
| Bartoněk, Bohumir | |
| Brhel, Bohumil | 10 |
| Dryml Sr., Aleš | 32 |
| Hádek, Bořivoj | 1 |
| Hádek, Jan | |
Havelka, Rudolf
| Holub I, Jan | 12 |
| Holub II, Jan | |
| Hradecký, Ladislav | 4 |
| Jedek, Lubomír | |
| Kalina, Vladimír | 4 |
| Karnas, Pavel | 10 |
| Kasper Jr., Antonín | 42 |
| Kasper Sr., Antonín | 13 |
| Kubíček, Stanislav | |
| Kudrna, Zdeněk | 9 |
| Machač, Jaroslav | |
| Majstr, Zdeněk | |
| Mareš, Pavel | |
| Matoušek, Roman | 26 |
| Ondrašík, Petr | 26 |
| Průša, Karel | |
| Richter, František | |
| Schneiderwind, Zdeněk | |
| Slaný, Bedřich | |
| Šmíd, Miroslav | |
| Sova, Emil | 7 |
| Špinka, Milan | 10 |
| Štancl, Jiří | 39 |
| Svoboda, Stanislav | |
| Tesař, Zdeněk | 13 |
| Tomíček Sr., Luboš | |
| Urban, Stanislav | 13 |
| Vandírek, Petr | 32 |
| Verner, Jan | 9 |
| Verner, Miloslav | |
| Verner, Václav | 42 |
| Volf, Jaroslav | |
