= Karel Průša =

Czech speedway rider (1938–2019)

- Born: 7 May 1938; Czechoslovakia
- Died: 14 August 2019 (aged 81)
- Nationality: Czech

Career history

Czechoslovakia
- 1957–1963: Ústí nad Labem
- 1967–1968: Prague

Individual honours
- 1963: Czechoslovak championship silver

Team honours
- 1962: Speedway World Team Cup finalist

Karel Průša (7 May 1938 – 14 August 2019) was a Czech international speedway rider.

== Speedway career ==
Průša began his speedway career riding at the Flóra Stadium in Žatec, after being introduced to the sport by his older brother Josef Průša, who was also a speedway rider.

Průša reached the final of the Speedway World Team Cup in the 1962 Speedway World Team Cup.

The following year in 1963, Průša took the silver medal behind Luboš Tomíček Sr. in the Czechoslovak Individual Championship.

Like many Czech riders of the time, the Czechoslovak authorities rarely allowed riders to compete for British league teams but they did allow club sides such as Prague to tour the United Kingdom, which allowed Průša to race in Britain in 1967 and 1968, where he starred alongside Antonín Kasper Sr. and Antonín Šváb Sr.

== World final appearances ==
=== World Team Cup ===
- 1962 – (Czech Republic) Slaný (with Bedřich Slaný / Bohumír Bartoněk / Jaroslav Volf / Luboš Tomíček Sr.) – 4th – 16pts (2)
