= Golden Helmet of Pardubice =

Speedway competition

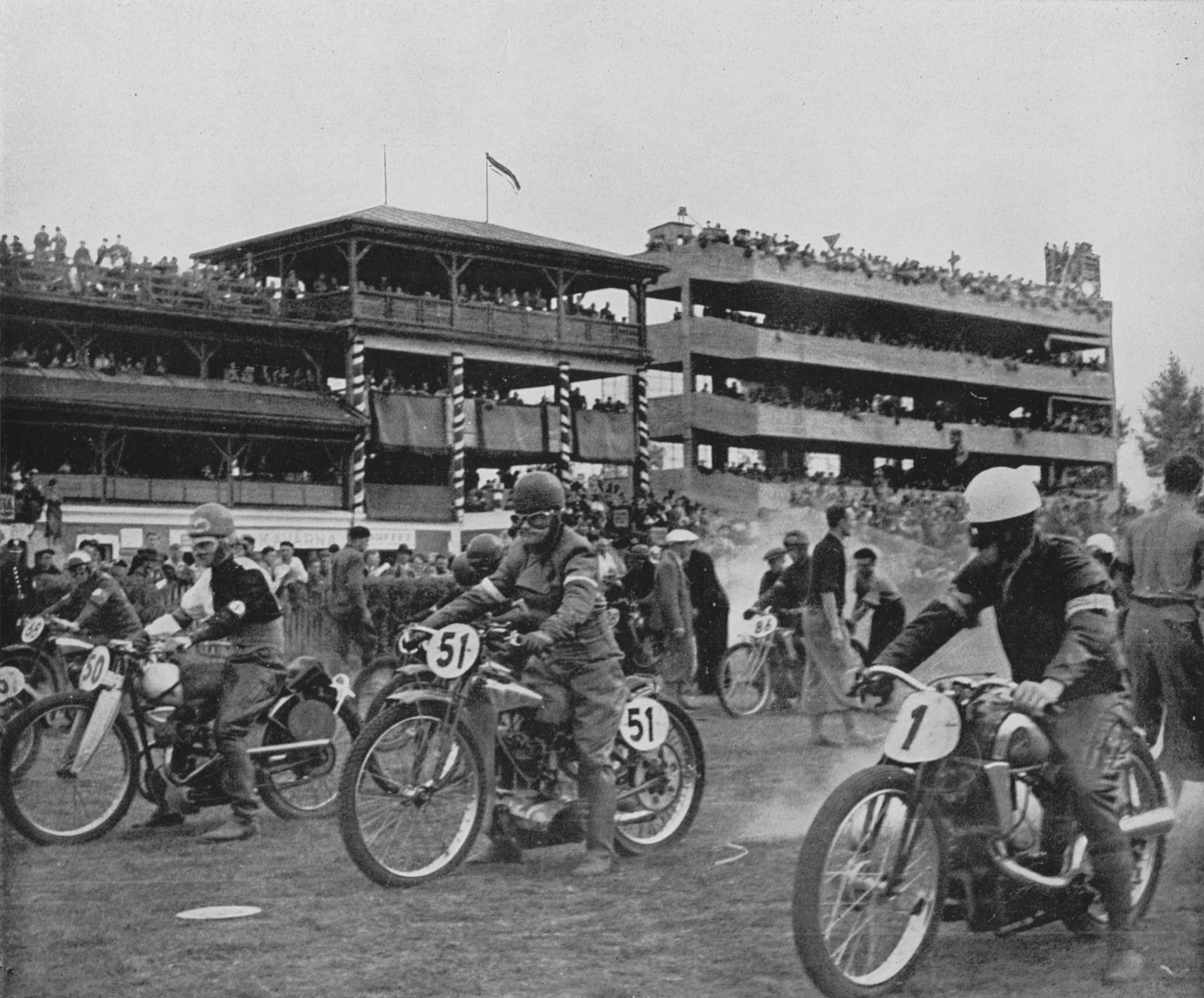
- Golden Helmet of Pardubice in 1938
- Sport: Motorcycle speedway
- Founded: 1929
- Most recent champion: Timo Lahti
- Most titles: Ole Olsen (7 times)

The Golden Helmet of Pardubice (Czech: Zlatá přilba) is a motorcycle speedway competition hosted annually in Pardubice, the Czech Republic. It is the oldest motorcycle speedway race in Europe and is considered prestigious.

== History ==
The race was established by three motorsport enthusiasts František Hladěna, Adolf Trnka and Ladislav Polák in 1929. The first 15 events of the Golden Helmet race were held on the 2.4 km (1.5 mi) long turf racetrack of Velká pardubická Steeplechase in Pardubice, from 1929 to 1963. On several occasions the event attracted more than 100,000 fans, but also five riders suffered mortal injuries competing on this dangerous grass track, including Luboš Tomíček Sr..

Since 1964, the race has been held on the standard flat oval cinder track of the Svítkov Stadium in Pardubice.

== Race format ==
In the first round, 24 riders are divided into four groups of six. Three riders advance from each group to the quarterfinal stage, where they join 12 seeded riders. In the quarterfinal, the same format sees three riders from each group progressing to the semi final. In the semi final two groups of six riders race three times with the top three riders from each group progressing to the final. The wide track of Pardubice enables up to six riders to compete in the event instead of the conventional four.

== Past winners ==
| Year | Date of Competition | Winner | Nation. | Runner-up | Nation. | 3rd place | Nation. |
| 1. | 29.09.1929 | Zdeněk Pohl | (Czechoslovakia) | Robert Uvíra | (Czechoslovakia) | Josef Hájek | (Czechoslovakia) |
| 2. | 31.08.1930 | Josef Antun Štrban | (Socialist Federal Republic of Yugoslavia) | Hans Hieronymus | (Germany) | Míťa Vychodil | (Czechoslovakia) |
| 3. | 06.09.1931 | Rudi Klein | (Germany) | Josef Riha | (Austria) | Antun Uroić | (Socialist Federal Republic of Yugoslavia) |
| 4. | 25.09.1932 | Hans Mayer | (Austria) | Hans Winkler | (Germany) | Josef Antun Štrban | (Socialist Federal Republic of Yugoslavia) |
| 5. | 01.10.1933 | Hans Walter Buttler | (Germany) | Erich Bertram | (Germany) | Hans Winkler | (Germany) |
| 6. | 02.09.1934 | Gerrit van Dijk | (Netherlands) | Hermann Gunzenhauser | (Germany) | Arend Hartman | (Netherlands) |
| 7. | 15.09.1935 | Herman Gunzenhauser | (Germany) | Erich Bertram | (Germany) | Leopold Killmeyer | (Austria) |
| 8. | 27.09.1936 | Herman Gunzenhauser | (Germany) | Hans Walter Buttler | (Germany) | Erich Bertram | (Germany) |
| 9. | 04.09.1938 | František Juhan | (Czechoslovakia) | Václav Stanislav | (Czechoslovakia) | Jan Lucák | (Czechoslovakia) |
The race was not run in 1939 - 1946 due to German occupation of Czechoslovakia (1938 - 1945).
| 10. | 07.09.1947 | Hugo Rosák | (Czechoslovakia) | Karl Killmeyer | (Austria) | Miloslav Špinka | (Czechoslovakia) |
| 11. | 04.09.1949 | Fritz Dirtl | (Austria) | Hugo Rosák | (Czechoslovakia) | Gerrit van Dijk | (Netherlands) |
| 12. | 09.09.1951 | Jan Lucák | (Czechoslovakia) | Hans Zierk | (East Germany) | Antonín Švarc | (Czechoslovakia) |
The race was not run in 1952 - 1960 due to lack of support to Speedway competitions from communist government in Czechoslovakia at that time.
| 13. | 20.08.1961 | Oldřich Klaudinger | (Czechoslovakia) | Jiří Jasanský | (Czechoslovakia) | Ervín Krajčovič | (Czechoslovakia) |
| 14. | 16.09.1962 | Josef Seidl | (Germany) | Jaroslav Machač | (Czechoslovakia) | Antonín Šváb Sr. | (Czechoslovakia) |
| 15. | 15.09.1963 | Antonín Kasper Sr. | (Czechoslovakia) | Martin Tatum | (United Kingdom) | Ervín Krajčovič | (Czechoslovakia) |
| 16. | 06.09.1964 | Igor Plechanov | (Soviet Union) | Antonín Kasper Sr. | (Czechoslovakia) | Boris Samorodov | (Soviet Union) |
| 17. | 12.09.1965 | Farit Šajnurov | (Soviet Union) | Stanislav Kubíček | (Czechoslovakia) | Antonín Kasper Sr. | (Czechoslovakia) |
| 18. | 18.09.1966 | Igor Plechanov | (Soviet Union) | Barry Briggs | (New Zealand) | Boris Samorodov | (Soviet Union) |
| 19. | 10.09.1967 | Ove Fundin | (Sweden) | Barry Briggs | (New Zealand) | Antonín Kasper Sr. | (Czechoslovakia) |
| 20. | 20.10.1968 | Leif Enecrona | (Sweden) | Ove Fundin | (Sweden) | František Ledecký | (Czechoslovakia) |
| 21. | 18.09.1969 | Gennady Kurilenko | (Soviet Union) | Valeri Klementiev | (Soviet Union) | Miloslav Verner | (Czechoslovakia) |
| 22. | 27.09.1970 | Ole Olsen | (Denmark) | Miloslav Verner | (Czechoslovakia) | Vladimir Gordeev | (Soviet Union) |
| 23. | 19.09.1971 | Ole Olsen | (Denmark) | Jim Airey | (Australia) | Hans Jürgen Fritz | (East Germany) |
| 24. | 01.10.1972 | Ole Olsen | (Denmark) | Ivan Mauger | (New Zealand) | Genadij Ivanov | (Soviet Union) |
| 25. | 22.09.1973 | Milan Špinka | (Czechoslovakia) | Ole Olsen | (Denmark) | Ivan Mauger | (New Zealand) |
| 26. | 22.09.1974 | Jiří Štancl | (Czechoslovakia) | Ivan Mauger | (New Zealand) | Genadij Ivanov | (Soviet Union) |
| 27. | 05.10.1975 | Ole Olsen | (Denmark) | Ivan Mauger | (New Zealand) | Jiří Štancl | (Czechoslovakia) |
| 28. | 03.10.1976 | Jiří Štancl | (Czechoslovakia) | Ole Olsen | (Denmark) | Ivan Mauger | (New Zealand) |
| 29. | 02.10.1977 | Ole Olsen | (Denmark) | Jiří Štancl | (Czechoslovakia) | Aleš Dryml Sr. | (Czechoslovakia) |
| 30. | 01.10.1978 | Jiří Štancl | (Czechoslovakia) | Michael Lee | (United Kingdom) | Ole Olsen | (Denmark) |
| 31. | 30.09.1979 | Ole Olsen | (Denmark) | Michael Lee | (United Kingdom) | Jiří Štancl | (Czechoslovakia) |
| 32. | 28.09.1980 | Ole Olsen | (Denmark) | Aleš Dryml Sr. | (Czechoslovakia) | Bobby Schwartz | (United States) |
| 33. | 27.09.1981 | Jiří Štancl | (Czechoslovakia) | Aleš Dryml Sr. | (Czechoslovakia) | Viktor Kuznetsov | (Soviet Union) |
| 34. | 26.09.1982 | Jiří Štancl | (Czechoslovakia) | Roman Jankowski | (Poland) | Aleš Dryml Sr. | (Czechoslovakia) |
| 35. | 25.09.1983 | Dennis Sigalos | (United States) | Jiří Štancl | (Czechoslovakia) | Ole Olsen | (Denmark) |
| 36. | 23.09.1984 | John Davis | (United Kingdom) | Lance King | (United States) | Jiří Štancl | (Czechoslovakia) |
| 37. | 22.09.1985 | Erik Gundersen | (Denmark) | Antonín Kasper Jr. | (Czechoslovakia) | Simon Wigg | (United Kingdom) |
| 38. | 21.09.1986 | Erik Gundersen | (Denmark) | Kelvin Tatum | (United Kingdom) | Sam Ermolenko | (United States) |
| 39. | 27.09.1987 | Hans Nielsen | (Denmark) | Kelvin Tatum | (United Kingdom) | Per Jonsson | (Sweden) |
| 40. | 02.10.1988 | Per Jonsson | (Sweden) | Roman Matoušek | (Czechoslovakia) | Jeremy Doncaster | (United Kingdom) |
| 41. | 24.09.1989 | Jeremy Doncaster | (United Kingdom) | Roman Matoušek | (Czechoslovakia) | Tony Olsson | (Sweden) |
| 42. | 30.09.1990 | Jeremy Doncaster | (United Kingdom) | Antonín Kasper Jr. | (Czechoslovakia) | Zdeněk Tesař | (Czechoslovakia) |
| 43. | 29.09.1991 | Antonín Kasper Jr. | (Czechoslovakia) | Ronnie Correy | (United States) | Jeremy Doncaster | (United Kingdom) |
| 44. | 27.09.1992 | Tony Rickardsson | (Sweden) | Antonín Kasper Jr. | (Czechoslovakia) | Mitch Shirra | (New Zealand) |
| 45. | 03.10.1993 | Tony Rickardsson | (Sweden) | Leigh Adams | (Australia) | Armando Castagna | (Italy) |
| 46. | 11.09.1994 | Simon Wigg | (United Kingdom) | Chris Louis | (United Kingdom) | Tony Rickardsson | (Sweden) |
| 47. | 04.09.1995 | Tony Rickardsson | (Sweden) | Tomáš Topinka | (Czech Republic) | Hans Nielsen | (Denmark) |
| 48. | 29.09.1996 | Tomáš Topinka | (Czech Republic) | Simon Wigg | (United Kingdom) | Chris Louis | (United Kingdom) |
| 49. | 05.10.1997 | Ryan Sullivan | (Australia) | Tony Rickardsson | (Sweden) | Mark Loram | (United Kingdom) |
| 50. | 04.10.1998 | Hans Nielsen | (Denmark) | Tony Rickardsson | (Sweden) | Brian Andersen | (Denmark) |
| 51. | 03.10.1999 | Leigh Adams | (Australia) | Tony Rickardsson | (Sweden) | Ryan Sullivan | (Australia) |
| 52. | 15.10.2000 | Leigh Adams | (Australia) | Greg Hancock | (United States) | Todd Wiltshire | (Australia) |
| 53. | 07.10.2001 | Leigh Adams | (Australia) | Marian Jirout | (Czech Republic) | Mark Loram | (United Kingdom) |
| 54. | 06.10.2002 | Jason Crump | (Australia) | Matej Zagar | (Slovenia) | Lee Richardson | (United Kingdom) |
| 55. | 27.09.2003 | Ryan Sullivan | (Australia) | Jason Crump | (Australia) | Lee Richardson | (United Kingdom) |
| 56. | 26.09.2004 | Leigh Adams | (Australia) | Aleš Dryml Jr. | (Czech Republic) | Hans N. Andersen | (Denmark) |
| 57. | 02.10.2005 | Scott Nicholls | (United Kingdom) | Nicki Pedersen | (Denmark) | Aleš Dryml Jr. | (Czech Republic) |
| 58. | 17.10.2006 | Jason Crump | (Australia) | Hans N. Andersen | (Denmark) | Nicki Pedersen | (Denmark) |
| 59. | 10.10.2007 | Andreas Jonsson | (Sweden) | Rune Holta | (Poland) | Kenneth Bjerre | (Denmark) |
| 60. | 05.10.2008 | Hans N. Andersen | (Denmark) | Leigh Adams | (Australia) | Matej Ferjan | (Hungary) |
| 61. | 04.10.2009 | Rune Holta | (Poland) | Grzegorz Walasek | (Poland) | Davey Watt | (Australia) |
| 62. | 03.10.2010 | Nicki Pedersen | (Denmark) | Fredrik Lindgren | (Sweden) | Andreas Jonsson | (Sweden) |
| 63. | 02.10.2011 | Rune Holta | (Poland) | Antonio Lindbäck | (Sweden) | Piotr Pawlicki | (Poland) |
| 64. | 14.10.2012 | Grzegorz Walasek | (Poland) | Fredrik Lindgren | (Sweden) | Hans N. Andersen | (Denmark) |
| 65. | 29.9.2013 | Darcy Ward | (Australia) | Greg Hancock | (United States) | Przemysław Pawlicki | (Poland) |
| 66. | 05.10.2014 | Chris Holder | (Australia) | Fredrik Lindgren | (Sweden) | Jurica Pavlic | (Croatia) |
| 67. | 20.09.2015 | Jurica Pavlic | (Croatia) | Troy Batchelor | (Australia) | Martin Smolinski | (Germany) |
| 68. | 19.09.2016 | Emil Sayfutdinov | (Russia) | Rune Holta | (Poland) | Martin Smolinski | (Germany) |
| 69. | 01.10.2017 | Václav Milík Jr. | (Czech Republic) | Rune Holta | (Poland) | Max Fricke | (Australia) |
| 70. | 30.09.2018 | Jason Doyle | (Australia) | Martin Vaculík | (Slovakia) | Václav Milík Jr. | (Czech Republic) |
| 71. | 06.10.2019 | Jason Doyle | (Australia) | Andžejs Ļebedevs | (Latvia) | Patryk Dudek | (Poland) |
| 72. | 04.10.2020 | Jason Doyle | (Australia) | Jan Kvěch | (Czech Republic) | Brady Kurtz | (Australia) |
| 73. | 03.10.2021 | Patryk Dudek | (Poland) | Jason Doyle | (Australia) | Timo Lahti | (Finland) |
| 74. | 25.09.2022 | Dan Bewley | (United Kingdom) | Václav Milík | (Czech Republic) | Rasmus Jensen | (Denmark) |
| 75. | 24.09.2023 | Timo Lahti | (Finland) | Jakub Jamróg | (Poland) | Dimitri Berge | (France) |
| 76. | 06.10.2024 | Rasmus Jensen | (Denmark) | Robert Chmiel | (Poland) | Mathias Pollestad | (Norway) |
| 77. | 12.09.2025 | Dimitri Bergé | (France) | Andžejs Ļebedevs | (Latvia) | Rasmus Jensen | (Denmark) |
| 78. | 4.10.2026 | Jan Kvěch | (Czech Republic) | Andžejs Ļebedevs | (Latvia) | Kai Huckenbeck | (Germany) |

== Statistics ==
Multiple Golden Helmet winners

Below is a list of multiple Golden Helmet winners.

| Rider | Nation | Golden Helmets |
|---|---|---|
| Ole Olsen | (Denmark) | 7 |
| Jiří Štancl | (Czechoslovakia) | 5 |
| Leigh Adams | (Australia) | 4 |
| Tony Rickardsson | (Sweden) | 3 |
| Jason Doyle | (Australia) | 3 |
| Herman Gunzenhauser | (Germany) | 2 |
| Igor Plechanov | (Soviet Union) | 2 |
| Erik Gundersen | (Denmark) | 2 |
| Hans Nielsen | (Denmark) | 2 |
| Jeremy Doncaster | (United Kingdom) | 2 |
| Ryan Sullivan | (Australia) | 2 |
| Jason Crump | (Australia) | 2 |
| Rune Holta | (Poland) | 2 |

Golden Helmet by Countries

| | Country | Riders | Total |
|---|---|---|---|
| 1 | Denmark | 6 | 14 |
| 2 | Czechoslovakia | 8 | 13 |
| 2 | Australia | 6 | 13 |
| 3 | Sweden | 5 | 7 |
| 4 | United Kingdom | 5 | 6 |
| 5 | Soviet Union | 3 | 4 |
| 5 | Poland | 3 | 4 |
| 6 | Czech Republic | 3 | 3 |
| 6 | Nazi Germany | 2 | 3 |
| 7 | Austria | 2 | 2 |
| 7 | Germany | 2 | 2 |
| 8 | Yugoslavia | 1 | 1 |
| 8 | Netherlands | 1 | 1 |
| 8 | United States | 1 | 1 |
| 8 | Croatia | 1 | 1 |
| 8 | Russia | 1 | 1 |
| 8 | Finland | 1 | 1 |
| 8 | France | 1 | 1 |

Speedway world champions winning Golden Helmet

Below is a list of Speedway World Champions who have also won Golden Helmet of Pardubice.

| Rider | Nation | Golden Helmets | World Championships |
|---|---|---|---|
| Ole Olsen | (Denmark) | 7 | 3 |
| Tony Rickardsson | (Sweden) | 3 | 6 |
| Jason Doyle | (Australia) | 3 | 1 |
| Hans Nielsen | (Denmark) | 2 | 4 |
| Erik Gundersen | (Denmark) | 2 | 3 |
| Jason Crump | (Australia) | 2 | 3 |
| Ove Fundin | (Sweden) | 1 | 5 |
| Nicki Pedersen | (Denmark) | 1 | 3 |
| Per Jonsson | (Sweden) | 1 | 1 |
| Chris Holder | (Australia) | 1 | 1 |
