= 1960 Speedway World Team Cup =

Inaugural edition of the annual motorcycle speedway World Cup competition

Seasons
- ← none 1961 →

1960 Speedway World Team Cup was the first edition of the FIM Speedway World Team Cup to determine the team world champions. The final took place in Gothenburg, Sweden. The World Champion title was won by Sweden team (44 pts) who beat England (30 pts), Czechoslovakia (15 pts) and Poland (7 pts).

Sweden's reigning World Champion Ove Fundin went through the entire World Team Cup undefeated. This feat would not be matched until Australia's Jason Crump went through the 2001 Speedway World Cup undefeated. To honour Fundin's deeds in 1960, the winners of the current Speedway World Cup (which replaced the Team World Cup in 2001) receive the Ove Fundin Trophy.

== Qualification ==
Alf Jonsson helped Sweden wn the semi final but waa unable to take his place in the final after breaking his leg in a British league match. He was replaced in the final by Björn Knutson.

=== Scandinavian Round ===
- 9 June
- (Denmark) Odense Athletics Stadium, Odense
- Att: 6,000

1st	2nd	3rd	4th
Sweden - 43; Ove Fundin - 12; Rune Sörmander - 11; Olle Nygren - 10; Alf Jonsson - 10	Denmark - 25; Arne Pander - 10; Hans P. Boiisen - 7 Kurt W. Petersen - 6 Svend Nissen - 2 Poul Wissing - 0	Norway - 21; Aage Hansen - 11; Rolf Mellerud - 3 Nils Paulsen - 3 Rolf Westerberg - 3 Sverre Harrfeldt - 1	Finland - 7 Kalevi Lahtinen - 3 Antti Pajari - 2 Timo Laine - 1 Valle Seliverstov - 1 Aulis Lethonen - 0

* Sweden to Final

=== British Round ===
- R1: 18 July - (England) Wimbledon Stadium, London

1st	2nd	3rd	4th
England - 35; Peter Craven - 12; Nigel Boocock - 9 Ron How - 8 Eric Williams - 6	New Zealand - 28; Barry Briggs - 11; Ronnie Moore - 11; Ron Johnston - 5 Trevor Redmond - 1 Bob Duckworth - 0	Australia - 18; Jack Young - 6 Peter Moore - 5 Chum Taylor - 4 Jack Geran - 2 Aub Lawson - 1	Challengers - 15; Ken McKinlay - 7 George White - 5 Bob Andrews - 2 Neil Street - 1 Ronnie Genz - 0

- R2: 21 July - (England) Oxford Stadium, Oxford

1st	2nd	3rd	4th
New Zealand - 27; Ronnie Moore - 11; Barry Briggs - 9 Ron Johnston - 4 Bob Duckworth - 3 Trevor Redmond - 0	England - 24; Peter Craven - 12; Eric Williams - 5 Ron How - 4 Ken McKinlay - 3 Gordon McGregor - 0	Challengers - 23; Mike Broadbank - 7 Ronnie Genz - 7 Nigel Boocock - 5 George White - 4	Australia - 22; Chum Taylor - 10; Jack Biggs - 4 Peter Moore - 3 Jack Geran - 3 Jack Young - 2

- R3: 5 August - (England) Abbey Stadium, Swindon

1st	2nd	3rd	4th
England - 33; Peter Craven - 12; Ron How - 11; Bob Andrews - 5 Ken McKinlay - 4 Ian Williams - 1	Challengers - 28; Mike Broadbank - 9 Peter Moore - 8 Nigel Boocock - 6 Eric Williams - 5	New Zealand - 23; Ronnie Moore - 9 Barry Briggs - 5 Ron Johnston - 5 Bob Duckworth - 4	Australia - 12; Chum Taylor - 5 Ray Cresp - 3 Aub Lawson - 3 Jack Young - 1 Neil Street - 0

- R4: 10 August - (England) Hyde Road, Manchester

1st	2nd	3rd	4th
England - 42; Ken McKinlay - 12; Peter Craven - 11; Ron How - 10; Nigel Boocock - 9	New Zealand - 28; Ronnie Moore - 11; Ron Johnston - 6 Bob Duckworth - 6 Barry Briggs - 5	Australia - 20; Jack Young - 8 Ray Cresp - 6 Chum Taylor - 5 Peter Moore - 1 Aub Lawson - 0	Challengers - 6 Eric Williams - 3 Dick Fisher - 1 Arthur Wright - 1 George White - 1 Tony Robinson - 0

Team	Points	R1	R2	R3	R4
England	134	35	24	33	42
New Zealand	106	28	27	23	28
Australia	72	18	22	12	20
Challengers	72	15	23	28	6

* England to Final

=== Central European Round ===
- 31 July
- (Czechoslovakia) Plzeň speedway track, Plzeň

1st	2nd	3rd	4th
Czechoslovakia - 47; Stanislav Svoboda - 12; František Richter - 12; Luboš Tomíček Sr. - 12; Antonín Kasper Sr. - 11	West Germany - 26; Josef Hofmeister - 9 Alfred Aberl - 8 Josef Seidl - 7 Hans Jager - 2	Austria - 13; Ferdinand Troner - 5 Josef Bössner - 3 Kurt Schwingenschlogl - 3 Erich Luther - 1 Leopold Dolanski - 1	Netherlands - 8 Hans van der Sluis - 3 Tonny Kroeze - 3 Thei Bisschops - 2

* Czechoslovakia to Final

=== East European Round ===
The round was canceled and Poland were awarded the round by the F.I.M when their opponents failed to contest the round. East Germany, Hungary and Yugoslavia were eliminated.

== World Final ==
- 2 September 1960
- (Sweden) Ullevi, Gothenburg
- Attendance: 11,500

Pos.	National team	Pts.	Riders
1st	Sweden	44	Rune Sörmander - 11 (3,2,3,3); Ove Fundin - 12 (3,3,3,3); Olle Nygren - 12 (3,3,3,3); Björn Knutson - 9 (3,E,3,3) res. Göte Nordin - NS
2nd	England	30	Peter Craven - 8 (2,2,2,2); Ron How - 7 (2,3,2,-); Ken McKinlay - 8 (2,3,1,2); Nigel Boocock - 1 (1,0,-,-) res. George White - 6 (-,-,2,2/2)
3rd	Czechoslovakia	15	Luboš Tomíček Sr. - 4 (0,2,1,1); Jaroslav Machač - 3 (1,1,1,0); František Richter - 3 (1,1,1,F); Antonín Kasper Sr. - 5 (2,0,2,1) res. Bohumír Bartoněk - NS
4	Poland	7	Konstanty Pociejkewicz - 3 (1,2,E,0); Marian Kaiser - 2 (0,1,0,1); Mieczysław Połukard - 2 (0,1,0,1); Jan Malinowski - 0 (E,0,F,0) res. Bronislaw Rogal - 0 (0)

== See also ==
- Motorcycle speedway
- 1960 Individual Speedway World Championship
