= Omer Kaleshi =

Macedonian painter (1932–2022)

- Born: 1932; Srbica, Kičevo, North Macedonia
- Died: 17 April 2022 (aged 89–90)
- Education: Mimar Sinan Fine Arts University
- Occupation: Painter

Omer Kaleshi (1932 – 17 April 2022) was an Albanian painter and visual artist.

== Biography ==
Born in the village of Srbica, Kičevo in North Macedonia, he had Albanian heritage. He began as a visual artist in Istanbul, Turkey, studying at the Mimar Sinan Fine Arts University. He lived in Paris, France. He made multiple paintings and was a talented artist from a small village in Kićevo, North Macedonia. His family had moved to Srbitsa from a village called Kaleshe before he was born.

== Sources ==
- Ag Apolloni: I live to paint. Symbol, No 12/2017.
- Ismail Kadare: Arti si mëkat. Tiranë, Onufri, 2015.
