= Miloslav Špinka =

Czech motorcycle speedway rider (1919 – 2009)

- Born: 3 December 1919; Czechoslovakia
- Died: 26 April 2009 (aged 89)
- Nationality: Czech

Career history

Czechoslovakia
- 1958, 1960–1962: Pardubice
- 1959: Ústí nad Labem
- 1970: Rudá Hvězda Praha

Individual honours
- 1950, 1956: Czechoslovak championship silver
- 1947: Golden Helmet of Pardubice bronze

Miloslav Špinka (3 December 1919 – 26 April 2009) was a Czech motorcycle speedway rider. He earned international caps for the Czechoslovakia national speedway team.

== Biography ==
Špinka came to prominence after winning the bronze medal at the Golden Helmet of Pardubice. He also took part in ice races and won the first post-war competition in Czechoslovakia, held in 1947 on Kamencové jezero in Chomutov.

In 1950 and 1956, Špinka was runner-up in the Czech Republic Individual Speedway Championship and in 1956, was called up to the Czechoslovak speedway national team, where he remained a member until 1961.

On 31 May 1959, Špinka was the first Czechoslovak rider to win the qualifying round of the individual world championships, winning the quarter final during the 1959 Individual Speedway World Championship, held at Stražišče Sports Park in Kranj.

In 1959 and 1961, Špinka advanced to the semi-finals of the individual European Long Track Championships. He was a pioneer of this discipline in the country, winning all competitions in this type of sport until 1956.

In the late 1950s, Špinka promoted ice speedways in the Soviet Union and last appeared in a speedway competition at the age of 51, on the track in Marianske Lazne.

After he retired, Špinka remained involved in speedway as a member of the Pardubice Automotoklub Zlatá přilba.

== Family ==
Špinka's son Milan was also an international speedway rider.
