= Jan Lucák =

Czech speedway rider

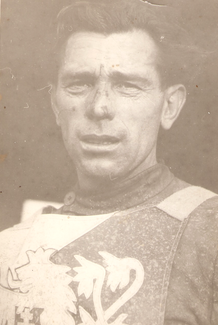
- Lucák in c. 1950
- Born: 20 July 1912; Strýčkovice, Austria-Hungary
- Died: 10 March 1997 (aged 84)
- Nationality: Czech

Career history

Czechoslovakia

Individual honours
- 1954: Czechoslovak Championship silver
- 1949, 1955: Czechoslovak Championship bronze
- 1951: Golden Helmet of Pardubice

Jan Lucák (20 July 1912 – 10 March 1997) was a Czech motorcycle speedway rider. He was capped by the Czechoslovak national speedway team.

== Career ==
Lucák was born on 20 July 1912 in Strýčkovice. He began a career connected with racing when he took on an apprenticeship at the Prague company of the Šulc brothers, who imported British motorcycles of the BSA brand. He participated in his first race at the age of 20 at a competition in Tábor. He also raced road racing and speedway. In the 1930s, he was a factory driver for the Ogar company and in 1935 he competed in the Swedish Grand Prix on a Velocette motorcycle. In 1935, he was the first winner of the 300-turn race in Hořice on an Ogar motorcycle in the 250 class. He became a Jawa factory rider in 1940, but World War II interrupted his activities.

At the beginning of the fifties, Lucák finished road racing, focusing only on speedway. Lucák along with Hugo Rosák was refused permission to leave Czechoslovakia during the 1950 Individual Speedway World Championship. In 1951, he won the prestigious Golden Helmet of Pardubice on a motorcycle with a JAP engine.

Lucák won the silver medal at the 1954 Czechoslovak Individual Speedway Championship. This was in-between two bronze medals won in 1949 and 1955 respectively.

Lucák died on 10 March 1997. In 2012, he was given a commemorative plaque in Strýčkovice.
