= Czech Republic Individual Speedway Championship =

Motorcycle speedway championship

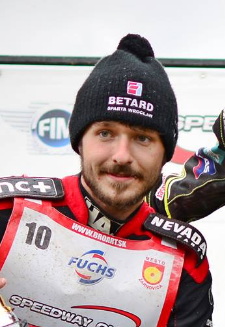
- Vaclav Milik Jr., eight time winner
- Sport: Motorcycle speedway
- Founded: 1949
- Most titles: Jiří Štancl (12)

The Czech Republic Individual Speedway Championship is a motorcycle speedway championship held each year to determine the Czech Republic national champion.

== History ==
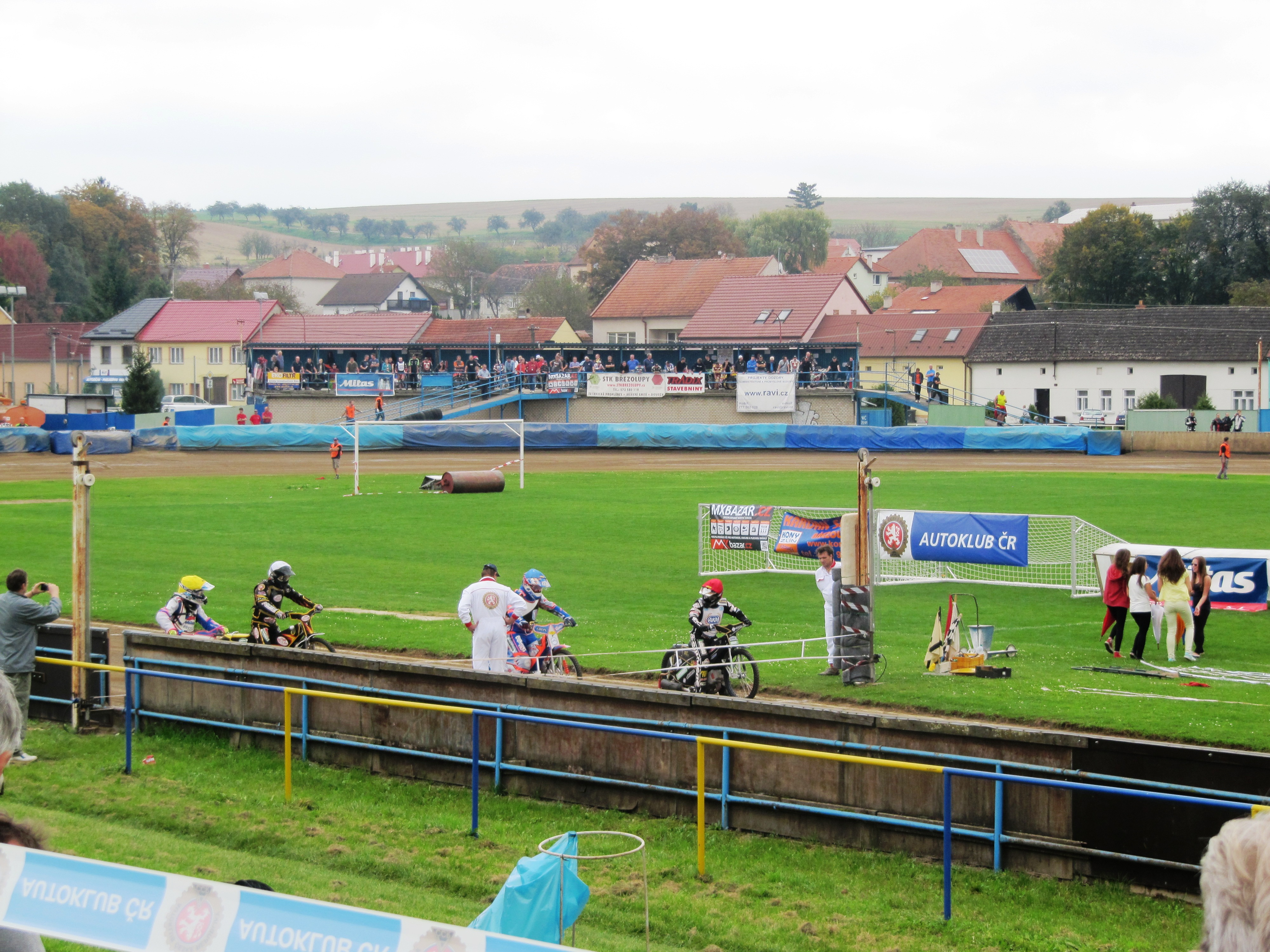
The second leg of the 2014 final on 11 October at Březolupy Speedway

It was first staged in 1949, and was known as the Czechoslovakia Individual Speedway Championship until 1992, when the country then divided into the Czech Republic and Slovakia. Jiří Štancl is the most successful rider having won the title 12 times, including ten years in a row from 1972 to 1981.

== Past winners ==
Year	Winner	2nd	3rd	Ref
1949	Hugo Rosák	Rudolf Havelka	Jan Lucák	
1950	Rudolf Havelka	Miloslav Špinka	Hugo Rosák	
1951–1953 not held
1954	Hugo Rosák	Jan Lucák	Rudolf Havelka	
1955	Hugo Rosák	Rudolf Havelka	Jan Lucák	
1956	Hugo Rosák	Miloslav Špinka	Rudolf Havelka	
1957	Rudolf Havelka	Josef Kysilka	Hugo Rosák	
1958	Richard Janíček	Luboš Tomíček Sr.	Zdeněk Dominik	
1959	František Richter	Jaroslav Machač	Luboš Tomíček Sr.	
1960	Jaroslav Machač	Antonín Kasper Sr.	Luboš Tomíček Sr.	
1961	Luboš Tomíček Sr.	František Richter	Antonín Kasper Sr.	
1962	Luboš Tomíček Sr.	Bedřich Slaný	František Richter	
1963	Luboš Tomíček Sr.	Karel Průša	Rudolf Havelka	
1964	Luboš Tomíček Sr.	Jaroslav Volf	Antonín Kasper Sr.	
1965	Luboš Tomíček Sr.	Pavel Mareš	Antonín Kasper Sr.	
1966	Antonín Šváb Sr.	Antonín Kasper Sr.	Luboš Tomíček Sr.	
1967	Antonín Šváb Sr.	Antonín Kasper Sr.	Luboš Tomíček Sr.	
1968	Jan Holub I	Luboš Tomíček Sr.	Antonín Šváb Sr.	
1969	Jan Holub I	František Ledecký	Karel Průša	
1970	Jiří Štancl	Václav Verner	Jan Holub I	
1971	Václav Verner	Jiří Štancl	Miloslav Verner	
1972	Jiří Štancl	Petr Ondrašík	Milan Špinka	
1973	Jiří Štancl	Petr Ondrašík	Milan Špinka	
1974	Jiří Štancl	Milan Špinka	Petr Ondrašík	
1975	Jiří Štancl	Petr Kučera	Václav Verner	
1976	Jiří Štancl	Václav Verner	Jan Verner	
1977	Jiří Štancl	Václav Verner	Jan Verner	
1978	Jiří Štancl	Václav Verner	Jan Verner	
1979	Jiří Štancl	Zdeněk Kudrna	Petr Ondrašík	
1980	Jiří Štancl	Václav Verner	Petr Ondrašík	
1981	Jiří Štancl	Aleš Dryml Sr.	Václav Verner	
1982	Aleš Dryml Sr.	Jiří Štancl	Petr Ondrašík	
1983	Jiří Štancl	Petr Ondrašík	Aleš Dryml Sr.	
1984	Aleš Dryml Sr.	Antonín Kasper Jr.	Petr Ondrašík	
1985	Antonín Kasper Jr.	Aleš Dryml Sr.	Jiří Štancl	
1986	Antonín Kasper Jr.	Roman Matoušek	Lubomír Jedek	
1987	Antonín Kasper Jr.	Petr Vandírek	Zdeněk Schneiderwind	
1988	Roman Matoušek	Antonín Kasper Jr.	Zdeněk Schneiderwind	
1989	Petr Vandírek	Zdeněk Tesař	Antonín Kasper Jr.	
1990	Antonín Kasper Jr.	Zdeněk Tesař	Petr Vandírek	
1991	Václav Milík Sr.	Bohumil Brhel	Lubomír Jedek	
1992	Bohumil Brhel	Antonín Kasper Jr.	Petr Vandírek	
1993	Bohumil Brhel	Petr Vandírek	Antonín Kasper Jr.	
1994	Antonín Kasper Jr.	Petr Vandírek	Václav Milík Sr.	
1995	Zdeněk Tesař	Antonín Šváb Jr.	Tomáš Topinka	
1996	Tomáš Topinka	Antonín Kasper Jr.	Bohumil Brhel	
1997	Antonín Kasper Jr.	Bohumil Brhel	Václav Milík Sr.	
1998	Bohumil Brhel	George Štancl	Antonín Kasper Jr.	
1999	Michal Makovský	Antonín Šváb Jr.	Bohumil Brhel	
2000	Bohumil Brhel	Pavel Ondrašík	Marián Jirout	
2001	Bohumil Brhel	Antonín Šváb Jr.	Marián Jirout	
2002	Antonín Kasper Jr.	Bohumil Brhel	Antonín Šváb Jr.	
2003	Tomáš Topinka	Adrian Rymel	Antonín Šváb Jr.	
2004	Bohumil Brhel	Adrian Rymel	Aleš Dryml Jr.	
2005	Lukáš Dryml	Josef Franc	Zdeněk Simota	
2006	Adrian Rymel	Josef Franc	Zdeněk Simota	
2007	Martin Vaculík	Josef Franc	Adrian Rymel	
2008	Lukáš Dryml	Aleš Dryml Jr.	Luboš Tomíček Jr.	
2009	Lukáš Dryml	Josef Franc	Matěj Kůs	
2010	Matěj Kůs	Lukáš Dryml	Hynek Štichauer	
2011	Aleš Dryml Jr.	Tomáš Suchánek	Matěj Kůs	
2012	Václav Milík Jr.	Lukáš Dryml	Matěj Kůs	
2013	Aleš Dryml Jr.	Václav Milík Jr.	Josef Franc	
2014	Václav Milík Jr.	Josef Franc	Matěj Kůs	
2015	Václav Milík Jr.	Matěj Kůs	Josef Franc	
2016	Václav Milík Jr.	Josef Franc	Matěj Kůs	
2017	Josef Franc	Eduard Krčmář	Zdeněk Simota	
2018	Josef Franc	Václav Milík Jr.	Eduard Krčmář	
2019	Václav Milík Jr.	Eduard Krčmář	Jan Kvěch	
2020	Eduard Krčmář	Václav Milík Jr.	Josef Franc	
2021	Václav Milík Jr.	Josef Franc	Petr Chlupáč	
2022	Václav Milík Jr.	Jan Kvěch	Eduard Krčmář	
2023	Václav Milík Jr.	Adam Bednář	Daniel Klíma	
2024	Jan Kvěch	Jan Macek	Jaroslav Vaníček	
2025	Jan Kvěch	Václav Milík Jr.	Daniel Klíma	

== See also ==
- Sport in the Czech Republic
- Czech Republic national speedway team
- Czech Republic Team Speedway Championship
