= Srbica (disambiguation) =

Srbica is a former name of the municipality of Skenderaj in the Mitrovica District of Kosovo.

Srbica may also refer to:

- Srbica, Kičevo, North Macedonia

== See also ==
- Srbice (disambiguation)
