= Srbice =

Srbice may refer to places in the Czech Republic:

- Srbice (Domažlice District), a municipality and village in the Plzeň Region
- Srbice (Teplice District), a municipality and village in the Ústí nad Labem Region
- Srbice, a village and part of Mochtín in the Plzeň Region
- Srbice, a village and part of Votice in the Central Bohemian Region

== See also ==
- Srbica (disambiguation)
