= Luboš Tomíček =

Luboš Tomíček may refer to:

- Luboš Tomíček Sr. (1934–1968), Czech speedway rider
- Luboš Tomíček Jr. (born 1986), Czech speedway rider
