= Jan Malinowski =

Polish speedway rider (1931–2018)

- Born: 24 April 1931; Grudziądz, Poland
- Died: 1 May 2018 (aged 87)
- Nationality: Polish

Career history
- 1950: Unia Grudziądz
- 1951: Unia Leszno
- 1952, 1954–1957: Gwardia/Polonia Bydgoszcz
- 1958–1968: Stal Rzeszów

Individual honours
- 1959: Polish silver medal

Team honours
- 1960.: Speedway World Team Cup
- 1951, 1955, 1960, 1961: Polish League Winner

Jan Malinowski (24 April 1931 – 1 May 2018) was an international speedway rider from Poland.

== Speedway career ==
Malinowski finished runner-up in the Polish Individual Speedway Championship in 1959. He was part of the Polish team that reached the final of the 1960 Speedway World Team Cup.

Malinowski toured the United Kingdom with the Polish national team during 1960.

Malinowski died in 2018.

== World final appearances ==
=== World Team Cup ===
- 1960 - (Sweden) Gothenburg, Ullevi (with Konstanty Pociejkewicz / Mieczysław Połukard / Marian Kaiser) - 4th - 7pts (0)
