= 1974 Speedway World Pairs Championship =

5th official edition of the World motorcycle speedway Pairs Championship

1974 World Pairs Championship

Seasons
- ← 1973 1975 →

The 1974 Speedway World Pairs Championship was the fifth official FIM Speedway World Pairs Championship. The final took place at the Hyde Road Speedway in Belle Vue, Manchester, England. The championship was won by Sweden (28 points) from Australia (23 pts) and New Zealand (21 pts). Host nation England, represented by Peter Collins and Dave Jessup, finished 4th with 21 points.

Swedish rider Anders Michanek, who successfully defended his World Pairs crown at this meeting, completed the double later in 1974 when he won the Individual World Championship.

== Semifinal 1 ==
- (Socialist Federal Republic of Yugoslavia) Mladost Stadum, Prelog
- 26 May

Placing	Pair / Rider Name	Total	1	2	3	4	5	6	7	8	9	10	11	12	13	14	15	16	17	18	19	20	21
1	Poland	28							10							20							28
1	(5) Zenon Plech	13		3			2			3					2				X			3
1	(6) Edward Jancarz	15		2			3			2					3				3			2
2	Soviet Union	26							8							18							26
2	(13) Vladimir Gordeev	15				3			3			2				3			2		2
2	(14) Viktor Kalmykov	11				X			2			3				2			1		3
3	Czechoslovakia	24							8							14							24
3	(1) Jiri Stancl	12	3			2				1			2				2			2
3	(2) Milan Spinka	12	2			1				0			3				3			3
4	Yugoslavia	12							2							8							12
4	(3) Evald Babic	1	1				-				-			-				-			-
4	(4) Josip Francic	11	0				1				3			3				3			1
5	Hungary	12							4							6							12
5	(11) Janos Szöke	6			3				1				0		0			0					2
5	(12) Istvan Sziraczky	6			X				0				1		1			1					3
6	Austria	9							5							7							9
6	(9) Hubert Fischbacher	9			2			3				1		1			1					1
6	(10) Helmut Schippl	0			F			-				-		-			-					-
7	Italy	9							4							7							9
7	(7) Francesco Biginato	8		1				2			2					1				1			1
7	(8) Sandro Pastorelli	1		0				1			0					0				0			0
Placing	Pair / Rider Name	Total	1	2	3	4	5	6	7	8	9	10	11	12	13	14	15	16	17	18	19	20	21

m - exclusion for exceeding two minute time allowance • t - exclusion for touching the tapes • x - other exclusion • e - retired or mechanical failure • f - fell
ns - non-starter • nc - non-classify

gate A - inside	gate B	gate C	gate D - outside

== Semifinal 2 ==
- (West Germany) Rodenbach Motodrom, Rodenbach
- 26 May

Placing	Pair / Rider Name	Total	1	2	3	4	5	6	7	8	9	10	11	12	13	14	15	16	17	18	19	20	21
1	Australia	28							9							19							28
1	(11) Phil Crump	16			3				3				3		3			1					3
1	(12) John Boulger	12			2				1				2		2			3					2
2	New Zealand	22							9							16							22
2	(7) Ivan Mauger	15		3				3			2					3				3			1
2	(8) Barry Briggs	7		1				2			1					1				2			0
3	Sweden	20							8							15							20
3	(3) Anders Michanek	10	2				1				0			3				2			2
3	(4) Tommy Jansson	10	3				2				3			1				0			1
4	Denmark	18							6							12							18
4	(13) Ole Olsen	16				3			2			3				2			3		3
4	(14) Finn Thomsen	2				1			0			1				0			0		0
5	Norway	15							5							11							15
5	(5) Reidar Eide	11		2			3			3					1				1			1
5	(6) Dag Lövaas	4		0			0			2					0				2			0
6	Scotland	14							2							6							14
6	(9) Jim McMillan	9			0			1				2		2			1					3
6	(10) George Hunter	5			1			0				0		0			2					2
7	West Germany	9							3							5							9
7	(1) Gerhard Uhlenbrock	8	0			2				1			1				3			1
7	(2) Jürgen Hehlert	1	1			0				0			0				0			0
Placing	Pair / Rider Name	Total	1	2	3	4	5	6	7	8	9	10	11	12	13	14	15	16	17	18	19	20	21

m - exclusion for exceeding two minute time allowance • t - exclusion for touching the tapes • x - other exclusion • e - retired or mechanical failure • f - fell
ns - non-starter • nc - non-classify

gate A - inside	gate B	gate C	gate D - outside

== World final ==
- (England) Hyde Road, Manchester
- 13 July

Placing	Pair / Rider Name	Total	1	2	3	4	5	6	7	8	9	10	11	12	13	14	15	16	17	18	19	20	21
1	Sweden	28							10							18							28
1	(13) Anders Michanek	14				3			2			2				3			2		2
1	(14) Sören Sjösten	14				2			3			1				2			3		3
2	Australia	23							10							17							23
2	(3) John Boulger	9	2				2				1			1				2			1
2	(4) Phil Crump	14	3				3				3			2				3			0
3	New Zealand	21							5							11							21
3	(9) Barry Briggs	4			0			E				0		0			2					2
3	(10) Ivan Mauger	17			2			3				3		3			3					3
4	England	20							5							15							20
4	(11) Peter Collins	12			1				1				3		3			1					3
4	(12) Dave Jessup	8			3				0				2		2			0					1
5	Poland	18							8							11							18
5	(7) Edward Jancarz	6		2				2			0					0				2			0
5	(8) Zenon Plech	12		3				1			2					1				3			2
6	Soviet Union	10							2							8							10
6	(5) Vladimir Gordeev	4		1			1			2					0				0			0
6	(6) Grigory Khlinovsky	6		0			0			3					1				1			1
7	Czechoslovakia	6							2							4							6
7	(1) Jan Hadek	3	0			0				1			1				1			0
7	(2) Jan Holub I	3	1			1				0			0				0			1
Placing	Pair / Rider Name	Total	1	2	3	4	5	6	7	8	9	10	11	12	13	14	15	16	17	18	19	20	21

m - exclusion for exceeding two minute time allowance • t - exclusion for touching the tapes • x - other exclusion • e - retired or mechanical failure • f - fell
ns - non-starter • nc - non-classify

gate A - inside	gate B	gate C	gate D - outside

== See also ==
- 1974 Individual Speedway World Championship
- 1974 Speedway World Team Cup
- motorcycle speedway
- 1974 in sports
