= Rudolf Havelka =

Czech speedway rider

- Born: 1 May 1927; Sezemice, Czechoslovakia
- Died: 14 April 2007 (aged 79); Pardubice, Czech Republic
- Nationality: Czech

Career history

Czechoslovakia
- 1962–1963: Pardubice

Individual honours
- 1950, 1957: Czechoslovak champion

Rudolf Havelka (1 May 1927 – 14 April 2007) was a Czech speedway rider. He represented the Czechoslovakia national speedway team.

== Speedway career ==
Havelka was champion of Czechoslovakia on two occasions after winning the Czechoslovak Championship in 1950 and 1957.
