= Edmund Migoś =

Polish speedway rider

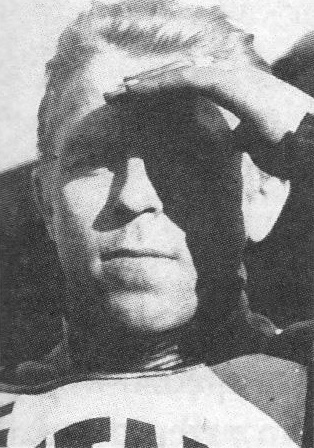
- Born: 20 August 1937; Poland
- Died: 3 September 2006 (aged 69); Gorzów Wielkopolski, Poland
- Nationality: Polish

Career history
- 1963-1971: Stal Gorzów Wielkopolski

Individual honours
- 1970: Polish Champion

Team honours
- 1966: Speedway World Team Cup gold medal
- 1968, 1970: Speedway World Team Cup bronze medal
- 1969: Polish League Champion

Edmund Migoś (1937-2006) was an international speedway rider from Poland.

== Speedway career ==
Migoś won a gold medal in the Speedway World Team Cup in the 1966 Speedway World Team Cup and two bronze medals in 1968 and 1970.

Migoś toured the United Kingdom with the Polish national team in 1966 and 1967.

In 2019, a monument was erected in Migoś' honour in Gorzów.

== World final appearances ==
=== Individual World Championship ===
- 1970 – (Poland) Wrocław, Olympic Stadium – Reserve – 4pts

=== World Team Cup ===
- 1966 - (Poland) Wrocław, Olympic Stadium (with Andrzej Pogorzelski / Andrzej Wyglenda / Antoni Woryna / Marian Rose) - Winner - 41pts - (did not ride)
- 1968 - (England) London, Wembley Stadium (with Edward Jancarz / Paweł Waloszek / Andrzej Wyglenda / Henryk Glücklich) - 3rd - 19pts (8)
- 1970 - (England) London, Wembley Stadium (with Jan Mucha / Paweł Waloszek / Antoni Woryna / Henryk Glücklich) - 3rd - 20pts (4)
