= František Juhan =

Czech motorcycle racer

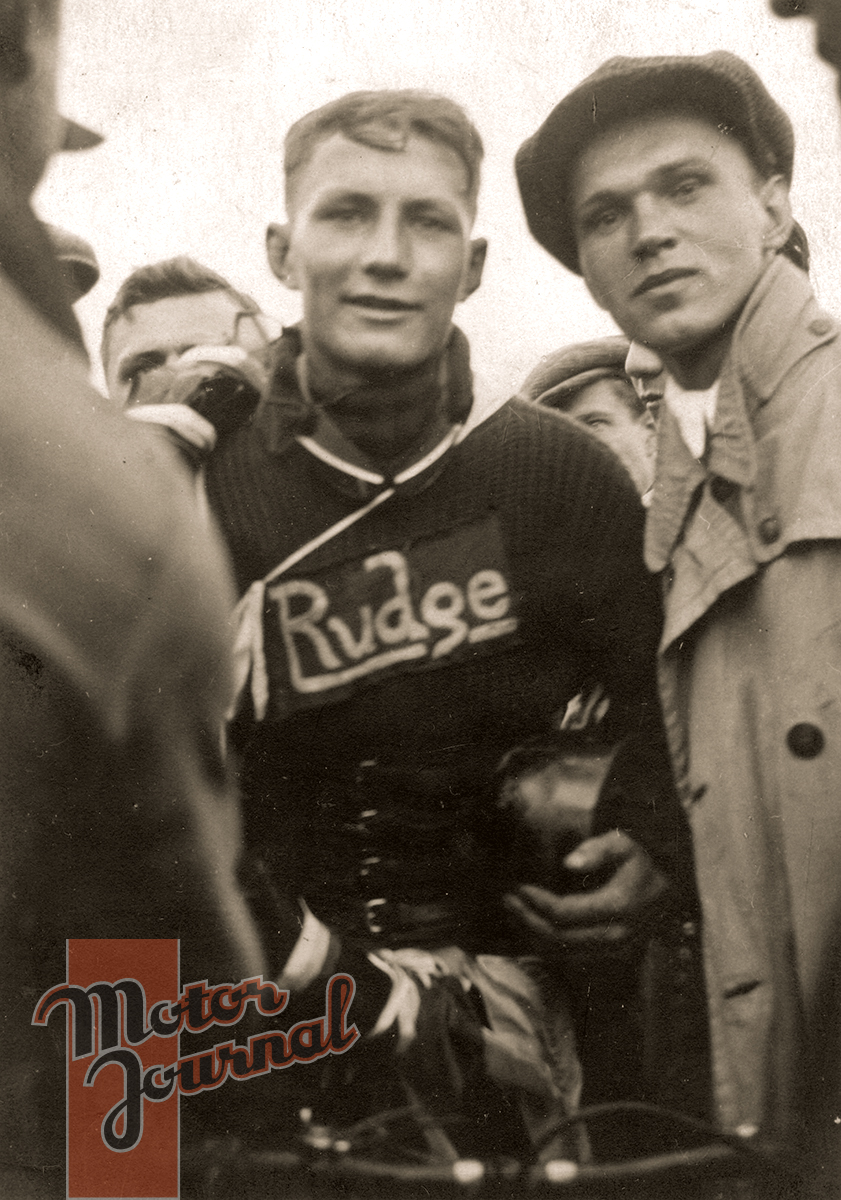
- Born: 4 May 1914; Prague, Bohemia, Austria-Hungary
- Died: 15 November 1992 (aged 78)
- Nationality: Czech

Individual honours
- 1938: Golden Helmet of Pardubice

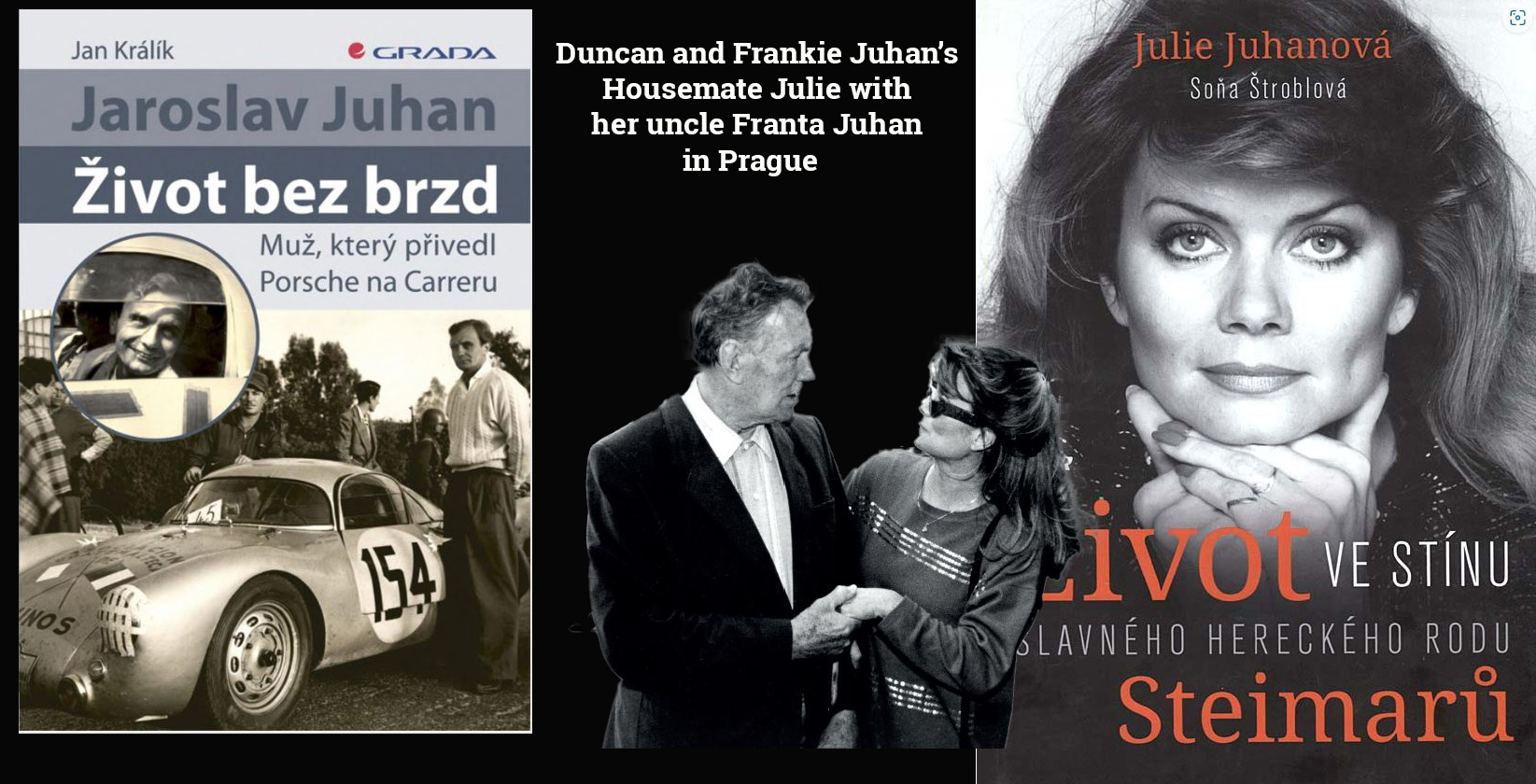
František, Julie and Jaroslav Juhan

František (Franta) Juhan (4 May 1914 – 15 November 1992) was a Czech motorcycle racer in speedway, road racing and trials.

== Career ==
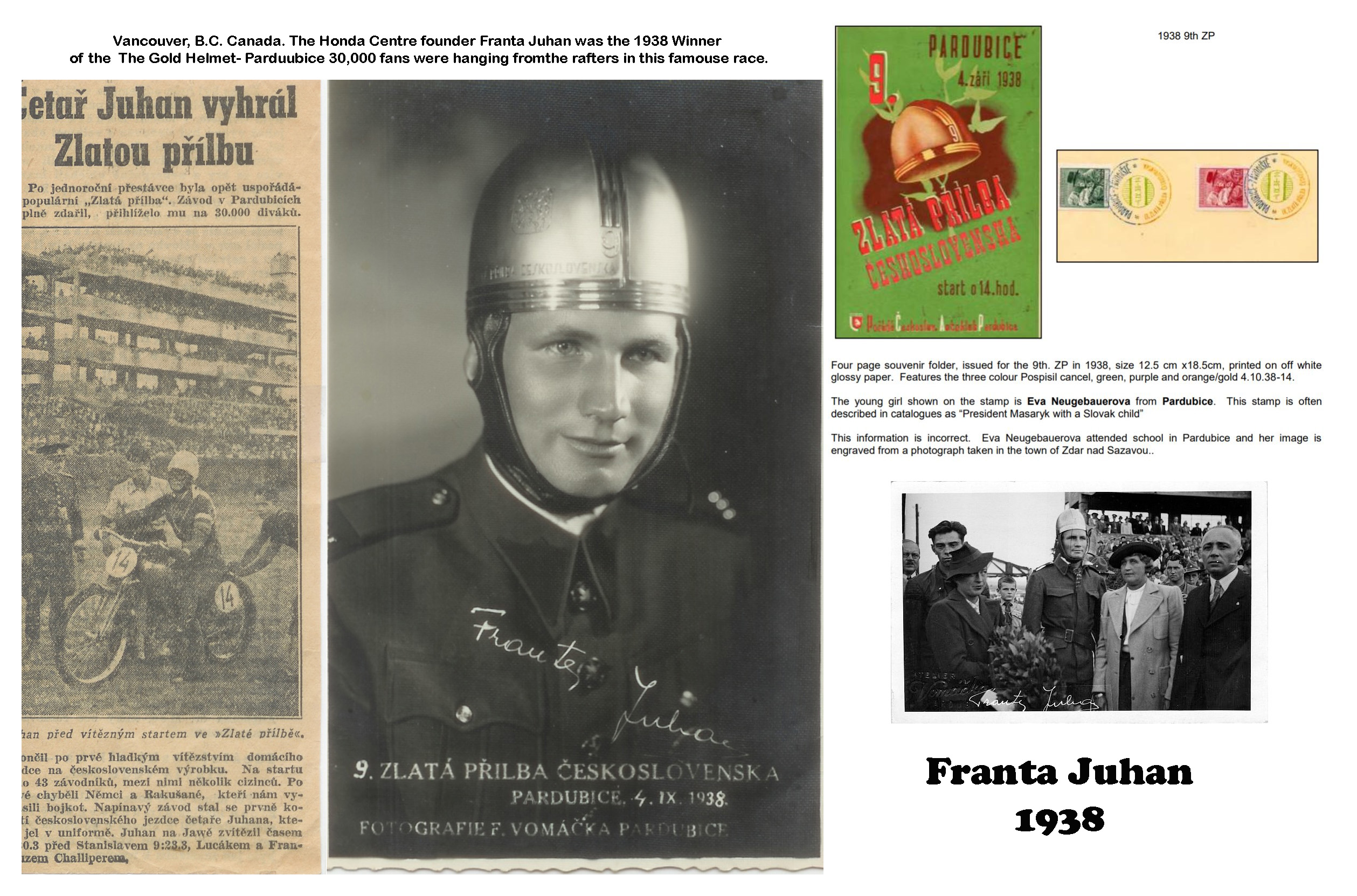
František Juhan with Gold helmet from Pardubice in 1938

Juhan has won the Golden Helmet of Pardubice in 1938 and was a member of the 1937 medal-winning Czechoslovak Six Days Trials Team.

Juhan was the brother of the famous Porsche racer and Pan America champion Jaroslav Juhan. Jaroslav won for Porsche also raced a Ferrari Testarossa 250TR in 1958 at Le Mans.

In Jaraslov's book "Life Without Brakes The man who brought Porsche to the Carrera" by Jan Králík and published Grada Publishing, there is a section on Juhan.

Juhan raced most of the historic brands of the era including Jawa, Vincent, Gilera, Moto Guzzi and MV Agusta.

Juhan immigrated to Vancouver in Canada, where he became a businessman. He founded the award-winning Honda Centre in 1965. His son Frankie Juhan continued to run the shop after his father died and both František and Frankie were inducted into the Greater Vancouver Motorsports Pioneers Society in 2018.

Juhan raced in the Isle of Man TT in 1935 and 1938. In 1938 he raced a Velocette.

In 1948, Juhan won the Grand Prix of Europe in Bern (Switzerland), riding a Velocette KTT 350 in which he set a new lap record.

The Juhan family were all winners, František Juhan and his son Frankie Juhan in Motorcycles and Jaroslav Juhan on four wheels with Ferrari and Porsche,
