= Ray Cresp =

Australian speedway rider (1928–2022)

- Born: 25 August 1928; Melbourne, Australia
- Died: 20 August 2022 (aged 93); Australia
- Nationality: Australian

Career history
- 1956: Eastbourne Eagles
- 1956: Wembley Lions
- 1957: Oxford Cheetahs
- 1958, 1960-1962: Ipswich Witches
- 1959: Poole Pirates
- 1962: Norwich Stars
- 1963: St Austell Gulls
- 1964: West Ham Hammers
- 1965, 1966: Long Eaton Archers

Individual honours
- 1961: Speedway World Championship finalist

Raymond Maurice Cresp (25 August 1928 - 20 August 2022) was an international speedway rider from Australia. He earned four international caps for the Australia national speedway team and six caps for the Great Britain national speedway team.

== Speedway career ==
Cresp was a professional boxer as a teenager before taking up road racing and moto cross. He was mentored by Jack Biggs before he moved to the UK in 1956. He rode in the top tier of British Speedway from 1956 to 1966, riding for various clubs. He gained four Australian caps and six British caps (when riders from Oceania were allowed to represent Britain.

Cresp reached the final of the Speedway World Championship in the 1961 Individual Speedway World Championship.

Cresp was a builder by trade and when he returned to Australia he enjoyed fly-fishing. He died in 2022.

== World final appearances ==
=== Individual World Championship ===
- 1961 – (Sweden) Malmö, Malmö Stadion - 14th - 3pts
