= Speedway World Team Cup =

Annual motorcycle speedway World Championship team event

FIM Speedway Team World Cup
- Sport: Motorcycle speedway
- Founded: 1960
- Folded: 2000
- Replaced by: Speedway World Cup
- Continent: World

The Speedway World Team Cup was an annual speedway event held each year in different countries. The competition started in 1960 and was replaced with the Speedway World Cup in 2001.

== Format ==
From 1960 until 1985, each team consisted of four riders and a reserve. A final meeting was held after qualifying rounds, the winner being decided on total points scored in that final meeting. In 1986, the teams that qualified for the 'final' raced three meetings, the winner of each meeting being awarded three points, second place awarded two points, and third place awarded a point. The total points gained over the three meetings determined the champion. In 1987, the three meeting system was used again, but this time the aggregate points scored by the individual riders were added together to determine the champion. 1988 saw the championship revert to the original format. In 1994, the World Pairs Championship was merged with the World Team Cup and this system was used until 1999 when it once gain reverted to the original format. In 2001, the competition was relaunched as the Speedway World Cup.

== Winners ==
Year	Venue	Winners	2nd place	3rd place
1960	(Sweden) Ullevi; Gothenburg	Sweden 44; Ove Fundin (12); Olle Nygren (12); Rune Sörmander (11); Björn Knutson (9); Göte Nordin (dnr)	England 30; Peter Craven (8); Ken McKinlay (8); Ron How (7); George White (6); Nigel Boocock (1)	Czechoslovakia 15; Antonín Kasper Sr. (5); Luboš Tomíček Sr. (4); Jaroslav Machač (3); František Richter (3); Bohumír Bartoněk (dnr)
1961	(Poland) Stadion Olimpijski; Wrocław	Poland 32; Marian Kaiser (10); Henryk Żyto (7); Florian Kapała (6); Mieczysław Połukard (5); Stanisław Tkocz (4)	Sweden 30; Ove Fundin (11); Björn Knutson (7); Per Tage Svensson (7); Rune Sörmander (4); Sören Sjösten (2)	England 15; Peter Craven (8); Bob Andrews (6); Ken McKinlay (4); Ron How (3); Cyril Maidment (dnr)
1962	(Czechoslovakia) Slaný Speedway; Slaný	Sweden 36; Björn Knutson (10); Sören Sjösten (10); Ove Fundin (9); Göte Nordin (4); Rune Sörmander (3)	(United Kingdom) Great Britain 24; Ronnie Moore (10); Barry Briggs (8); Peter Craven (6); Ron How (0); Cyril Maidment (0)	Poland 20; Marian Kaiser (9); Florian Kapała (5); Joachim Maj (4); Paweł Waloszek (4); Mieczysław Połukard (2)
1963	(Austria) Stadion Wien; Vienna	Sweden 37; Björn Knutson (11); Per Olof Söderman (10); Ove Fundin (7); Göte Nordin (5); Rune Sörmander (4)	Czechoslovakia 27; Antonín Kasper Sr. (10); Stanislav Kubíček (7); Miroslav Šmíd (5); Luboš Tomíček Sr. (5); Zdeněk Kovář (dnr)	(United Kingdom) Great Britain 25; Barry Briggs (12); Peter Craven (8); Dick Fisher (4); Leo McAuliffe (1); Peter Moore (0)
1964	(West Germany) Abensberg Speedwaystadion; Abensberg	Sweden 34; Björn Knutson (11); Göte Nordin (10); Rune Sörmander (7); Ove Fundin (6); Sören Sjösten (0)	Soviet Union 25; Igor Plekhanov (8); Gennady Kurilenko (8); Yuri Chekranov (6); Boris Samorodov (3); Viktor Trofimov (dnr)	(United Kingdom) Great Britain 21; Barry Briggs (9); Ken McKinlay (7); Nigel Boocock (3); Ron How (2); Brian Brett (0)
1965	(West Germany) Illerstadion; Kempten	Poland 38; Andrzej Wyglenda (11); Andrzej Pogorzelski (11); Antoni Woryna (9); Zbigniew Podlecki (7); Paweł Waloszek (dnr)	Sweden 33; Björn Knutson (11); Bengt Jansson (8); Ove Fundin (8); Göte Nordin (6); Leif Larsson (dnr)	(United Kingdom) Great Britain 18; Ken McKinlay (7); Nigel Boocock (6); Jimmy Gooch (3); Barry Briggs (1); Charlie Monk (1)
1966	(Poland) Stadion Olimpijski; Wrocław	Poland 41; Marian Rose (12); Andrzej Wyglenda (11); Antoni Woryna (10); Andrzej Pogorzelski (8); Edmund Migoś (dnr)	Soviet Union 25; Boris Samorodov (9); Viktor Trofimov (6); Igor Plekhanov (6); Farid Szajnurov (4); Yuri Chekranov (dnr)	Sweden 22; Björn Knutson (11); Leif Enecrona (4); Göte Nordin (3); Ove Fundin (2); Leif Larsson (2)
1967	(Sweden) Malmö Stadion; Malmö	Sweden 32; Göte Nordin (11); Bengt Jansson (9); Torbjörn Harrysson (6); Ove Fundin (6); Per Olof Söderman (dnr)	Poland 26; Antoni Woryna (10); Andrzej Wyglenda (9); Jerzy Trzeszkowski (4); Zbigniew Podlecki (3); Andrzej Pogorzelski (0)	(United Kingdom) Great Britain 19; Barry Briggs (8); Eric Boocock (5); Ray Wilson (4); Ivan Mauger (2); Colin Pratt (0) Soviet Union 19; Igor Plekhanov (9); Viktor Trofimov (4); Boris Samorodov (3); Gabdrakhman Kadyrov (2); Farid Szajnurov (1)
1968	(England) Wembley Stadium; London	(United Kingdom) Great Britain 40; Ivan Mauger (12); Nigel Boocock (10); Martin Ashby (8); Barry Briggs (7); Norman Hunter (3)	Sweden 30; Ove Fundin (11); Bengt Jansson (7); Anders Michanek (7); Olle Nygren (3); Torbjörn Harrysson (2)	Poland 19; Edmund Migoś (8); Edward Jancarz (6); Andrzej Wyglenda (2); Henryk Glücklich (2); Paweł Waloszek (1)
1969	(Poland) Rybnik Municipal Stadium; Rybnik	Poland 31; Andrzej Wyglenda (11); Edward Jancarz (11); Stanisław Tkocz (4); Henryk Glücklich (3); Andrzej Pogorzelski (2)	(United Kingdom) Great Britain 27; Ivan Mauger (9); Barry Briggs (8); Nigel Boocock (5); Martin Ashby (5); Pete Smith (dnr)	Soviet Union 23; Vladimir Smirnov (9); Gennady Kurilenko (8); Valeri Klementiev (5); Yury Dubinin (1); Viktor Trofimov (0)
1970	(England) Wembley Stadium; London	Sweden 42; Ove Fundin (11); Bengt Jansson (11); Anders Michanek (10); Sören Sjösten (10); Bernt Persson (dnr)	(United Kingdom) Great Britain 31; Barry Briggs (11); Ivan Mauger (9); Eric Boocock (5); Ray Wilson (4); Nigel Boocock (2)	Poland 20; Jan Mucha (6); Antoni Woryna (5); Edmund Migoś (4); Henryk Glücklich (3); Paweł Waloszek (2)
1971	(Poland) Stadion Olimpijski; Wrocław	(United Kingdom) Great Britain 37; Ray Wilson (12); Ivan Mauger (10); Jim Airey (9); Barry Briggs (6); Ronnie Moore (dnr)	Soviet Union 22; Grigory Khlinovsky (8); Vladimir Smirnov (7); Vladimir Gordeev (4); Anatoly Kuzmin (3); Viktor Trofimov (dnr)	Poland 19; Paweł Waloszek (5); Henryk Glücklich (4); Antoni Woryna (4); Edward Jancarz (4); Andrzej Wyglenda (2)
1972	(West Germany) Olching Speedwaybahn; Olching	(United Kingdom) Great Britain 36; Ivan Mauger (11); John Louis (9); Ray Wilson (8); Terry Betts (8); Ronnie Moore (dnr)	Soviet Union 21; Anatoly Kuzmin (6); Grigory Khlinovsky (5); Viktor Kalmykov (5); Viktor Trofimov (5); Valery Gordeev (dnr)	Poland 21; Zenon Plech (7); Henryk Glücklich (6); Paweł Waloszek (5); Zdzisław Dobrucki (3); Marek Cieślak (0)
1973	(England) Wembley Stadium; London	(United Kingdom) Great Britain 37; Peter Collins (12); Terry Betts (9); Ray Wilson (8); Malcolm Simmons (8); Dave Jessup (dnr)	Sweden 31; Anders Michanek (11); Bernt Persson (9); Bengt Jansson (6); Tommy Jansson (5); Sören Sjösten (dnr)	Soviet Union 20; Valery Gordeev (7); Vladimir Paznikov (5); Grigory Khlinovsky (4); Aleksandr Pavlov (2); Viktor Trofimov (2)
1974	(Poland) Silesian Stadium; Chorzów	England 42; Peter Collins (12); John Louis (12); Dave Jessup (10); Malcolm Simmons (8); Ray Wilson (dnr)	Sweden 31; Sören Sjösten (10); Anders Michanek (9); Tommy Jansson (7); Christer Löfqvist (5); Tommy Johansson (dnr)	Poland 13; Zenon Plech (4); Jan Mucha (4); Andrzej Jurczyński (3); Andrzej Tkocz (2); Jerzy Szczakiel (0)
1975	(West Germany) Motodrom Halbemond; Norden	England 41; Peter Collins (12); Malcolm Simmons (11); Martin Ashby (10); John Louis (8); Dave Jessup (dnr)	Soviet Union 29; Valery Gordeev (8); Grigory Khlinovsky (8); Viktor Trofimov (8); Vladimir Gordeev (5); Mikhail Starostin (dnr)	Sweden 17; Anders Michanek (8); Tommy Jansson (4); Bernt Persson (2); Sören Sjösten (2); Sören Karlsson (1)
1976	(England) White City Stadium; London	Australia 31; Phil Crump (11); Billy Sanders (7); Phil Herne (7); John Boulger (6); Garry Middleton (dnr)	Poland 28; Edward Jancarz (8); Marek Cieślak (8); Zenon Plech (8); Jerzy Rembas (5); Bolesław Proch (1)	Sweden 26; Anders Michanek (11); Bernt Persson (8); Lars-Åke Andersson (5); Bengt Jansson (5); Christer Löfqvist (1)
1977	(Poland) Stadion Olimpijski; Wrocław	England 37; Peter Collins (10); Dave Jessup (9); Michael Lee (9); John Davis (6); Malcolm Simmons (3)	Poland 25; Edward Jancarz (10); Bogusław Nowak (6); Jerzy Rembas (6); Marek Cieślak (2); Ryszard Fabiszewski (1)	Czechoslovakia 23; Jiří Štancl (8); Václav Verner (5); Jan Verner (5); Aleš Dryml Sr. (5); Petr Ondrašík (dnr)
1978	(West Germany) Stadion Ellermühle; Landshut	Denmark 37; Hans Nielsen (11); Ole Olsen (10); Mike Lohmann (9); Finn Thomsen (7); Kristian Præstbro (dnr)	England 27; Malcolm Simmons (8); Peter Collins (6); Dave Jessup (5); Michael Lee (5); Gordon Kennett (3)	Poland 15; Edward Jancarz (6); Marek Cieślak (5); Jerzy Rembas (3); Zenon Plech (1); Andrzej Huszcza (1)
1979	(England) White City Stadium; London	New Zealand 35; Larry Ross (11); Mitch Shirra (10); Ivan Mauger (9); Bruce Cribb (5); Roger Abel (dnr)	Denmark 31; Ole Olsen (12); Hans Nielsen (9); Mike Lohmann (6); Finn Thomsen (4); Bo Petersen (0)	Czechoslovakia 19; Jiří Štancl (6); Aleš Dryml Sr. (5); Zdeněk Kudrna (4); Václav Verner (4); Petr Ondrašík (dnr)
1980	(Poland) Stadion Olimpijski; Wrocław	England 40; Chris Morton (11); Michael Lee (11); Peter Collins (10); Dave Jessup (8); John Davis (dnr)	United States 29; Bruce Penhall (12); Scott Autrey (9); Dennis Sigalos (5); Bobby Schwartz (3); Ron Preston (0)	Poland 15; Zenon Plech (5); Roman Jankowski (5); Edward Jancarz (3); Andrzej Huszcza (2); Jerzy Rembas (0)
1981	(West Germany) Olching Speedwaybahn; Olching	Denmark 36; Hans Nielsen (11); Erik Gundersen (9); Tommy Knudsen (9); Ole Olsen (6); Finn Thomsen (1)	England 29; Chris Morton (11); Kenny Carter (9); John Davis (5); Dave Jessup (3); Gordon Kennett (1)	(West Germany) Germany 28; Egon Müller (10); Karl Maier (8); Georg Hack (5); Georg Gilgenreiner (5); Alois Wiesböck (dnr)
1982	(England) White City Stadium; London	United States 34; Bruce Penhall (10); Kelly Moran (10); Bobby Schwartz (9); Shawn Moran (8); Scott Autrey (0)	Denmark 27; Hans Nielsen (11); Erik Gundersen (7); Preben Eriksen (4); Tommy Knudsen (1); Ole Olsen (1)	(West Germany) Germany 18; Karl Maier (7); Georg Hack (5); Egon Müller (5); Georg Gilgenreiner (1); Alois Wiesböck (0)
1983	(Denmark) Vojens Speedway Center; Vojens	Denmark 37; Erik Gundersen (12); Hans Nielsen (11); Ole Olsen (7); Peter Ravn (7); Finn Thomsen (0)	England 29; Michael Lee (11); Kenny Carter (8); Chris Morton (7); Dave Jessup (2); Peter Collins (1)	United States 27; Dennis Sigalos (9); Bobby Schwartz (6); Lance King (6); Kelly Moran (6); Rick Miller (dnr)
1984	(Poland) Alfred Smoczyk Stadium; Leszno	Denmark 44; Erik Gundersen (12); Bo Petersen (12); Hans Nielsen (11); Preben Eriksen (9); Peter Ravn (dnr)	England 24; Simon Wigg (9); Phil Collins (7); Chris Morton (4); Peter Collins (2); Neil Collins (2)	United States 20; Shawn Moran (6); Kelly Moran (5); Lance King (5); Bobby Schwartz (2); John Cook (2)
1985	(United States) Veterans Memorial Stadium; Long Beach	Denmark 37; Tommy Knudsen (12); Erik Gundersen (10); Hans Nielsen (10); Preben Eriksen (5); Bo Petersen (0)	United States 35; Shawn Moran (11); Bobby Schwartz (11); Lance King (9); Sam Ermolenko (3); John Cook (1)	England 13; Jeremy Doncaster (6); Kelvin Tatum (3); Phil Collins (2); Richard Knight (2); John Davis (0)
1986 championship decided on points of three of three meetings – 1st = 3pts, 2nd = 2pts, 3rd = 1pt.
1986	(Sweden) Ullevi; Gothenburg (Denmark) Vojens Speedway Center; Vojens (England) Odsal Stadium; Bradford	Denmark 130 (47 + 37 + 46); Hans Nielsen (35); Erik Gundersen (33); Tommy Knudsen (33); Jan O. Pedersen (20); John Jørgensen (8)	United States 4 (76); Shawn Moran (27); Sam Ermolenko (22); Lance King (19); Bobby Schwartz (5); Rick Miller (2)	England 3 (81); Simon Wigg (6); Chris Morton (3); Kelvin Tatum (2); Jeremy Doncaster (2); Marvyn Cox (0)
1987 championship decided on aggregate scores of three meetings.
1987	(Denmark) Fredericia Stadion; Fredericia (England) Brandon Stadium; Coventry (Czechoslovakia) Marketa Stadium; Prague	Denmark 130 (47 + 37 + 46); Hans Nielsen (38); Erik Gundersen (33); Jan O. Pedersen (32); Tommy Knudsen (27); John Jørgensen (dnr)	England 101 (37 + 33 + 31); Simon Wigg (29); Kelvin Tatum (25); Jeremy Doncaster (24); Simon Cross (21); Marvyn Cox (0)	United States 93 (24 + 43 + 26); Shawn Moran (23); Rick Miller (22); Sam Ermolenko (20); Kelly Moran (14); Lance King (8); John Cook (6)
1988	(United States) Veterans Memorial Stadium; Long Beach	Denmark 44; Hans Nielsen (14); Jan O. Pedersen (12); Erik Gundersen (8); Tommy Knudsen (8); John Jørgensen (2)	United States 32; Sam Ermolenko (13); Shawn Moran (8); Lance King (6); Kelly Moran (5); Rick Miller (0)	Sweden 22; Per Jonsson (9); Jimmy Nilsen (5); Tony Olsson (4); Henrik Gustafsson (4); Conny Ivarsson (0)
1989	(England) Odsal Stadium; Bradford	England 48; Jeremy Doncaster (13); Kelvin Tatum (12); Paul Thorp (12); Simon Wigg (11); Simon Cross (0)	Denmark 34; Hans Nielsen (11); Gert Handberg (9); John Jørgensen (7); Brian Karger (7); Erik Gundersen (0)	Sweden 30; Mikael Blixt (10); Per Jonsson (8); Tony Olsson (7); Erik Stenlund (5); Jimmy Nilsen (0)
1990	(Czechoslovakia) Svítkov Stadion; Pardubice	United States 37; Kelly Moran (12); Sam Ermolenko (11); Shawn Moran (10); Billy Hamill (4); Rick Miller (0)	England 34; Kelvin Tatum (11); Jeremy Doncaster (8); Simon Wigg (8); Gary Havelock (5); Marvyn Cox (2)	Denmark 30; Hans Nielsen (13); Brian Karger (5); John Jørgensen (4); Tommy Knudsen (4); Bo Petersen (4)
1991	(Denmark) Vojens Speedway Center; Vojens	Denmark 51; Jan O. Pedersen (15); Hans Nielsen (14); Tommy Knudsen (13); Gert Handberg (8); Brian Karger (1)	Sweden 30; Per Jonsson (9); Henrik Gustafsson (7); Jimmy Nilsen (7); Tony Rickardsson (7); Peter Nahlin (dnr)	United States 28; Sam Ermolenko (9); Billy Hamill (9); Greg Hancock (6); Rick Miller (4); Ronnie Correy (0)
1992	(Sweden) Kumla Speedway; Kumla	United States 39; Greg Hancock (11); Sam Ermolenko (10); Billy Hamill (10); Ronnie Correy (5); Bobby Ott (3)	Sweden 33; Henrik Gustafsson (12); Per Jonsson (11); Tony Rickardsson (7); Peter Nahlin (2); Jimmy Nilsen (1)	England 31; Martin Dugard (12); Gary Havelock (7); Mark Loram (7); Kelvin Tatum (3); Joe Screen (2)
1993	(England) Brandon Stadium; Coventry	United States 40; Sam Ermolenko (13); Billy Hamill (10); Greg Hancock (9); Josh Larsen (5); Bobby Ott (3)	Denmark 38; Hans Nielsen (13); Tommy Knudsen (12); John Jørgensen (8); Brian Karger (5); Brian Andersen (dnr)	Sweden 28; Tony Rickardsson (9); Peter Karlsson (7); Per Jonsson (6); Henrik Gustafsson (6); Peter Nahlin (dnr)
From 1994 the World Pairs Championship merged into the World Team Cup.
1994	(Germany) Holsteinring Brokstedt; Brokstedt	Sweden 23; Tony Rickardsson (13); Henrik Gustafsson (11); Mikael Karlsson (–)	Poland 20; Tomasz Gollob (16); Jacek Gollob (4); Dariusz Śledź (0)	Denmark 17; Tommy Knudsen (12); Hans Nielsen (5); Jan Stæchmann (0)
1995	(Poland) Polonia Bydgoszcz Stadium; Bydgoszcz	Denmark 28; Tommy Knudsen (15); Hans Nielsen (13); Brian Karger (0)	England 22; Mark Loram (11); Chris Louis (11); Steve Schofield (–)	United States 19; Sam Ermolenko (9); Greg Hancock (8); Billy Hamill (2)
1996	(Germany) Rhein-Main Arena; Diedenbergen	Poland 27; Tomasz Gollob (15); Sławomir Drabik (12); Piotr Protasiewicz (0)	Russia 22; Rinat Mardanshin (13); Oleg Kurguskin (5); Sergey Darkin (4)	Denmark 21; Brian Andersen (16); Jesper B. Jensen (4); Nicki Pedersen (1)
1997	(Poland) Stadion Żużlowy Centrum; Piła	Denmark 27; Hans Nielsen (14); Tommy Knudsen (13); Jesper B. Jensen (–)	Poland 25; Tomasz Gollob (13); Piotr Protasiewicz (12); Jacek Krzyżaniak (0)	Sweden 21; Tony Rickardsson (17); Jimmy Nilsen (3); Peter Karlsson (1)
1998	(Denmark) Vojens Speedway Center; Vojens	United States 28; Billy Hamill (16); Greg Hancock (12); Sam Ermolenko (–)	Sweden 24; Jimmy Nilsen (13); Peter Karlsson (6); Tony Rickardsson (5)	Denmark 23; Hans Nielsen (10); Brian Andersen (9); Brian Karger (4)
From 1999 format reverted to four riders per team plus reserve.
1999	(Czech Republic) Svítkov Stadion; Pardubice	Australia 51; Leigh Adams (14); Jason Crump (13); Ryan Sullivan (12); Jason Lyons (10); Todd Wiltshire (2)	Czech Republic 35; Aleš Dryml Jr. (10); Bohumil Brhel (9); Michal Makovský (8); Antonín Kasper Jr. (8); Antonín Šváb Jr. (0)	United States 29; Sam Ermolenko (16); Greg Hancock (6); Billy Hamill (6); Josh Larsen (2); Ronnie Correy (0)
2000	(England) Brandon Stadium; Coventry	Sweden 40; Tony Rickardsson (16); Peter Karlsson (12); Henrik Gustafsson (10); Mikael Karlsson (2); Niklas Klingberg (0)	England 40; Joe Screen (12); Mark Loram (11); Chris Louis (8); Carl Stonehewer (5); Martin Dugard (4)	United States 35; Greg Hancock (16); Billy Hamill (10); John Cook (7); Sam Ermolenko (2); Brent Werner (0)

=== Medal classification ===
Pos	National Team	Gold	Silver	Bronze	Total
1.	Denmark	11	4	4	19
2.	Great Britain/England	9	12	8	29
3.	Sweden	8	8	7	23
4.	Poland	5	5	8	18
5.	United States	5	4	7	16
6.	Australia	2	–	–	2
7.	New Zealand	1	–	–	1
8.	Soviet Union/Russia	–	6	3	9
9.	Czechoslovakia/Czech Republic	–	2	3	5
10.	Germany	–	–	2	2

== See also ==
- Speedway World Pairs Championship
- Speedway World Cup
- Team Speedway Junior World Championship (U-21)
- List of world cups and world championships
