= Srbice (Domažlice District) =

- Municipality
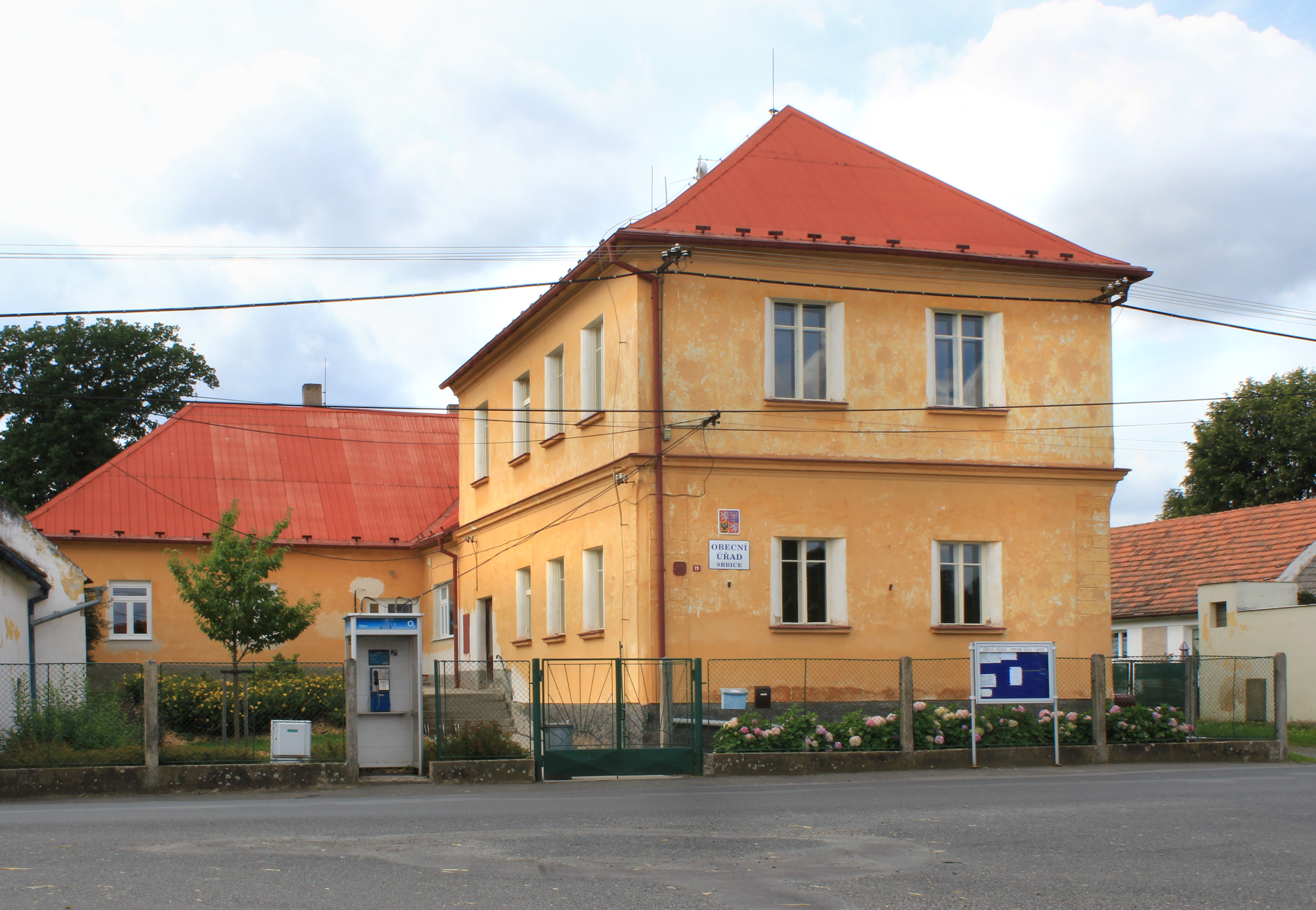
- Municipal office

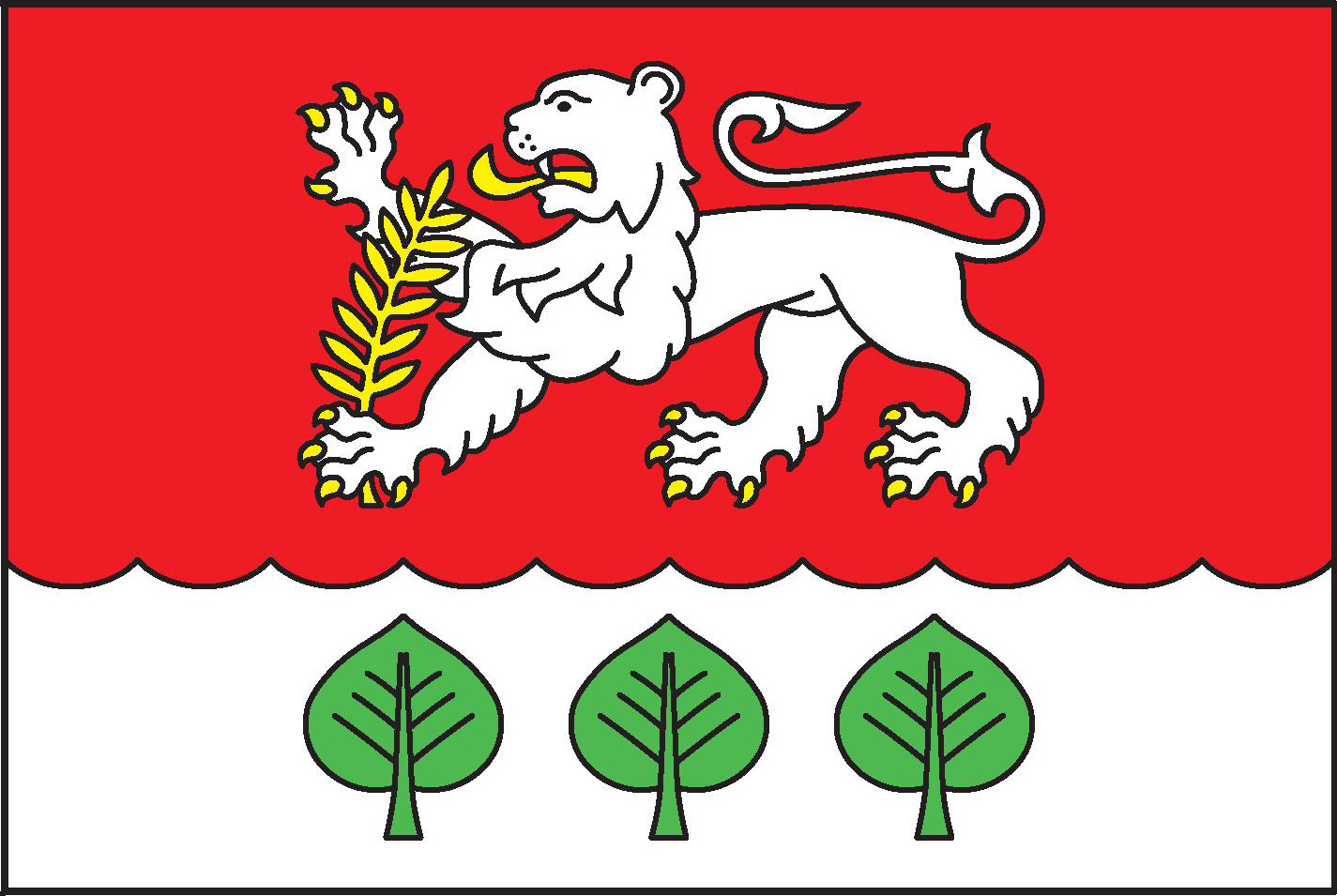
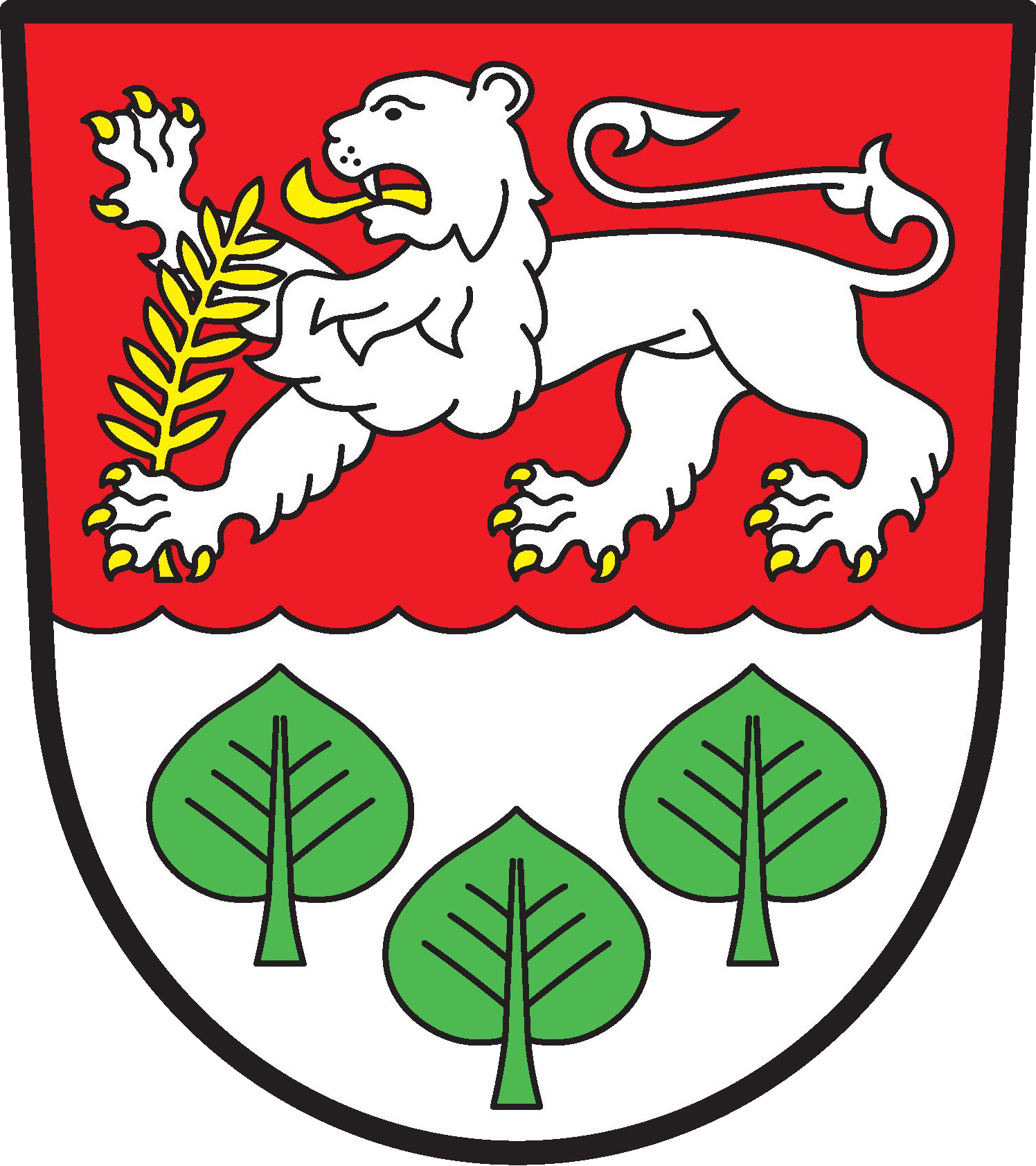
- Flag Coat of arms

- Location in the Czech Republic
- Coordinates: 49°30′30″N 13°7′7″E
- Country: Czech Republic
- Region: Plzeň
- District: Domažlice
- First mentioned: 1226

Area
  - Total: 13.84 km^{2} (5.34 sq mi)
- Elevation: 433 m (1,421 ft)

Population (2026-01-01)
  - Total: 406
  - Density: 29.3/km^{2} (76.0/sq mi)
- Time zone: UTC+1 (CET)
  - Summer (DST): UTC+2 (CEST)
- Postal code: 345 43
- Website: www.obecsrbice.cz

Srbice is a municipality and village in Domažlice District in the Plzeň Region of the Czech Republic. It has about 400 inhabitants.

Srbice lies approximately 16 kilometres (10 mi) north-east of Domažlice, 33 km (21 mi) south-west of Plzeň, and 114 km (71 mi) south-west of Prague.

== Administrative division ==
Srbice consists of four municipal parts (in brackets population according to the 2021 census):

- Srbice (178)
- Háje (15)
- Strýčkovice (121)
- Těšovice (76)

== Demographics ==
Historical population
Year	Pop.	±%
1869	858	—
1880	943	+9.9%
1890	978	+3.7%
1900	924	−5.5%
1910	1,026	+11.0%
1921	980	−4.5%
1930	922	−5.9%
1950	710	−23.0%
1961	706	−0.6%
1970	603	−14.6%
1980	500	−17.1%
1991	435	−13.0%
2001	398	−8.5%
2011	373	−6.3%
2021	390	+4.6%
Source: Censuses

== Notable people ==
- Jan Lucák (1912–1997), motorcycle speedway rider
