= Hugo Rosák =

Czech speedway rider

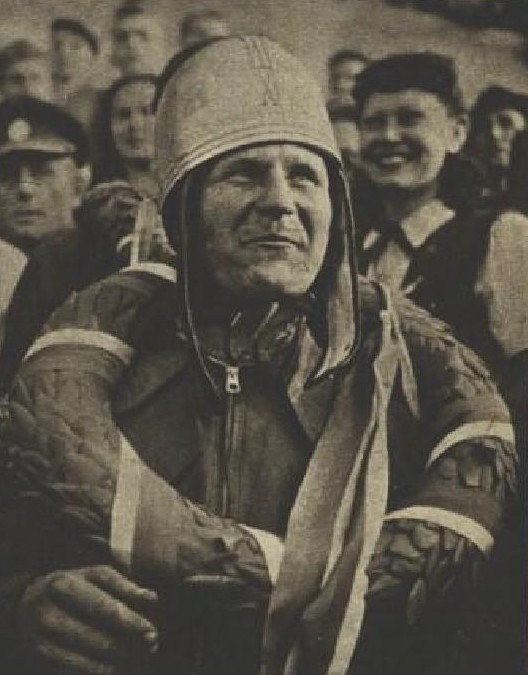
- Born: 16 October 1916; Konárovice, Bohemia, Austria-Hungary
- Died: 5 August 1982 (aged 65)
- Nationality: Czech

Individual honours
- 1949, 1954, 1955, 1956: Czechoslovak champion

Hugo Rosák (16 October 1916 – 5 August 1982) was a Czech speedway rider.

== Speedway career ==
Rosák was champion of Czechoslovakia on four occasions after winning the Czechoslovak Championship in 1949, 1954, 1955 and 1956.

Rosák, along with Jan Lucák, was refused permission to leave Czechoslovakia during the 1950 Individual Speedway World Championship.
