= Jan Holub I =

Czech speedway rider (1942–2018)

- Born: 12 August 1942; České Budějovice, Protectorate of Bohemia and Moravia
- Died: 18 February 2018 (aged 75); České Budějovice, Czech Republic
- Nationality: Czech

Career history

Czechoslovakia
- 1968: Prague
- 1969: Slaný

Great Britain
- 1969-1970: Exeter Falcons

Individual honours
- 1968, 1969: Czechoslovak champion

Jan Holub I (12 August 1942 – 18 February 2018) was a Czech motorcycle speedway rider. He was capped 12 times by the Czechoslovak national speedway team.

== Speedway career ==
Holub was a two times champion of the Czechoslovakia, winning the 1968 and 1969 Czechoslovak Individual Speedway Championship.

In 1967, Holub was part of the Prague team that toured the United Kingdom and 1968, where he starred alongside Antonín Kasper Sr. and Antonín Šváb Sr.

Holub rode in the top tier of British Speedway riding for Exeter Falcons from 1969 until 1970.

Holub reached three Speedway World Pairs Championship finals, the third was in 1974 when partnered Jan Hádek to the final at the 1974 Speedway World Pairs Championship, which was won by Sweden.

In 1977, the Bristol Bulldogs team manager Pat Tapson unsuccessfully asked the Czech authorities to allow Holub and Jan Hádek to compete in the British leagues.

== World Final appearances ==
=== World Pairs Championship ===
- 1969 - (Sweden) Stockholm (with Zdeněk Majstr) - 5th - 12pts (8)
- 1972 - (Sweden) Borås (with Jiří Štancl) - 6th - 12pts (5)
- 1974 – (England) Manchester, Hyde Road (with Jan Hádek) – 7th – 6pts (3)

=== World Team Cup ===
- 1968 - (England) London, Wembley Stadium (with Antonín Kasper Sr. / Luboš Tomíček Sr. / Jaroslav Volf) - 4th - 7pts
- 1970 - (England) London, Wembley Stadium (with Zdeněk Majstr / Jiří Štancl / Miloslav Verner / Václav Verner) - 4th - 3pts
