= Miroslav Šmíd (speedway rider) =

Czech speedway rider

- Born: Czechoslovakia
- Nationality: Czech

Career history
- 1968: Czechoslovakia

Prague

Team honours
- 1963: Speedway World Team Cup silver medal / finalist

Miroslav Šmíd is a Czech former international speedway rider.

== Speedway career ==
Šmíd won a silver medal at the Speedway World Team Cup in the 1963 Speedway World Team Cup.

Like many Czech riders of the time, the Czechoslovak authorities rarely allowed riders to compete for British league teams, but they did allow club sides such as Prague to tour the United Kingdom, which allowed Šmíd to race in Britain in 1968, where he starred alongside Antonín Kasper Sr. and Antonín Šváb Sr. and drew attention as the rider to watch out for on the tour following a strong World Championship qualifying campaign.

== World final appearances ==
=== World Team Cup ===
- 1963 - (Austria) Vienna, Stadion Wien (with Stanislav Kubíček / Luboš Tomíček Sr. / Antonín Kasper Sr. - 2nd - 27pts (5)
