= Stanislav Svoboda (speedway rider) =

Czech speedway rider

- Born: 27 August 1919; Czechoslovakia
- Died: 1992 (aged 72-73)
- Nationality: Czech

Career history

Czechoslovakia
- 1959–1960: Ústí nad Labem

Individual honours
- 1959, 1960: Continental finalist

Team honours
- 1961: Speedway World Team Cup finalist

Stanislav Svoboda (1919–1992) was an international speedway rider from Czechoslovakia.

== Speedway career ==
Svoboda reached the final of the Speedway World Team Cup in the 1961 Speedway World Team Cup. He was twice a Continental Speedway Finalist in 1959 and 1960.

== World final appearances ==
=== World Team Cup ===
- 1961 - (Poland) Wrocław, Olympic Stadium (with Antonín Kasper Sr. / Bohumír Bartoněk / Luboš Tomíček Sr.) - 4th - 1pts (0)
