= Petr Ondrašík =

Slovak speedway rider (born 1951)

- Born: 8 October 1951 (age 75); Brezolupy, Czechoslovakia
- Nationality: Czechoslovakian

Career history

Czechoslovakia
- 1972–1985: Rudá Hvězda Praha

Great Britain
- 1980: Wolverhampton Wolves
- 1983: Birmingham Brummies

Individual honours
- 1972, 1973, 1983: Czech National silver

Petr Ondrašík (born 8 October 1951) is a Slovak former international motorcycle speedway rider. He earned 26 caps for the Czechoslovakia national speedway team.

== Career ==
Ondrašík reached the World Final four times. He finished runner-up three times in the Czech speedway Championship.

In 1974, Ondrašík represented his country in a test series against England.

Ondrašík rode in the United Kingdom for the Wolverhampton Wolves (1980), Eastbourne Eagles (1983) and the Birmingham Brummies (1983).

== Family ==
Petr, the father of former Trelawny Tigers rider Pavel Ondrašík, is now an international referee.

== World Final appearances ==
=== Individual World Championship ===
- 1978 - (England) London, Wembley Stadium - 16th - 0pts
- 1979 - (Poland) Chorzów, Silesian Stadium - Reserve - did not ride
- 1980 - (Sweden) Gothenburg, Ullevi - 16th - 0pts
- 1984 - (Sweden) Gothenburg, Ullevi - 13th - 3pts

=== World Pairs Championship ===
- 1973 - (Sweden) Borås (with Jiří Štancl) - 6th - 11pts (2)

=== World Team Cup ===
- 1980 - (Poland) Wrocław, Olympic Stadium (with Jiří Štancl / Zdeněk Kudrna / Aleš Dryml / Václav Verner) - 4th - 12pts (3)
- 1982 - (England) London, White City Stadium (with Jiří Štancl / Aleš Dryml / Václav Verner / Antonín Kasper, Jr.) - 4th - 17pts (0)
- 1983 - (Denmark) Vojens, Speedway Center (with Jiří Štancl / Aleš Dryml / Václav Verner / Antonín Kasper, Jr.) - 4th - 3pts (0)
