= Jaroslav Machač =

Czech speedway rider (born 1926)

- Born: 1926; Czechoslovakia
- Nationality: Czech

Career history

Czechoslovakia
- 1958–1969: Rudá Hvězda Praha

Individual honours
- 1960: Czechoslovakian champion
- 1960, 1969: European Longtrack Championship finalist

Team honours
- 1960: Speedway World Team Cup bronze medal

Jaroslav Machač (born 1926) is a former international speedway rider from Czechoslovakia.

== Speedway career ==
Machač reached the final of the Speedway World Team Cup in the 1960 Speedway World Team Cup. He was champion of Czechoslovakia in 1960 after winning the Czechoslovakian Championship, and reached two European Longtrack Championship finals in 1960 and 1969.

== World final appearances ==
=== World Team Cup ===
- 1960 - (Sweden) Gothenburg, Ullevi (with František Richter / Luboš Tomíček Sr. / Antonín Kasper Sr. / Bohumír Bartoněk) - 3rd - 15pts (4)

=== Individual Ice Speedway World Championship ===
- 1969 - (West Germany) Inzell, 7th - 8pts
- 1970 - (Sweden) Nässjö, 10th - 6pts
