= František Richter =

Czech speedway rider (1931–2020)

- Born: 27 August 1931; Czechoslovakia
- Died: 27 March 2020 (aged 88)
- Nationality: Czech

Career history

Czechoslovakia
- 1958–1959: KAMK Karlovy Vary
- 1960–19: Žatec
- ?: Mariánské Lázně

Individual honours
- 1959: Czechoslovakian champion
- 1960: European Longtrack Championship finalist

Team honours
- 1960: Speedway World Team Cup bronze medal

František Richter (27 August 1931 – 27 March 2020) was a Czech international speedway rider.

== Speedway career ==
Richter reached the final of the inaugural Speedway World Team Cup at the 1960 Speedway World Team Cup, winning a bronze medal.

Richter was champion of Czechoslovakia in 1959 after winning the Czechoslovakian Championship.

== World final appearances ==
=== World Team Cup ===
- 1960 - (Sweden) Gothenburg, Ullevi (with Jaroslav Machač / Luboš Tomíček Sr. / Antonín Kasper Sr. / Bohumír Bartoněk) - 3rd - 15pts (4)
