= Srbica, Kičevo =

Srbica Србица Sërbicë
- Village
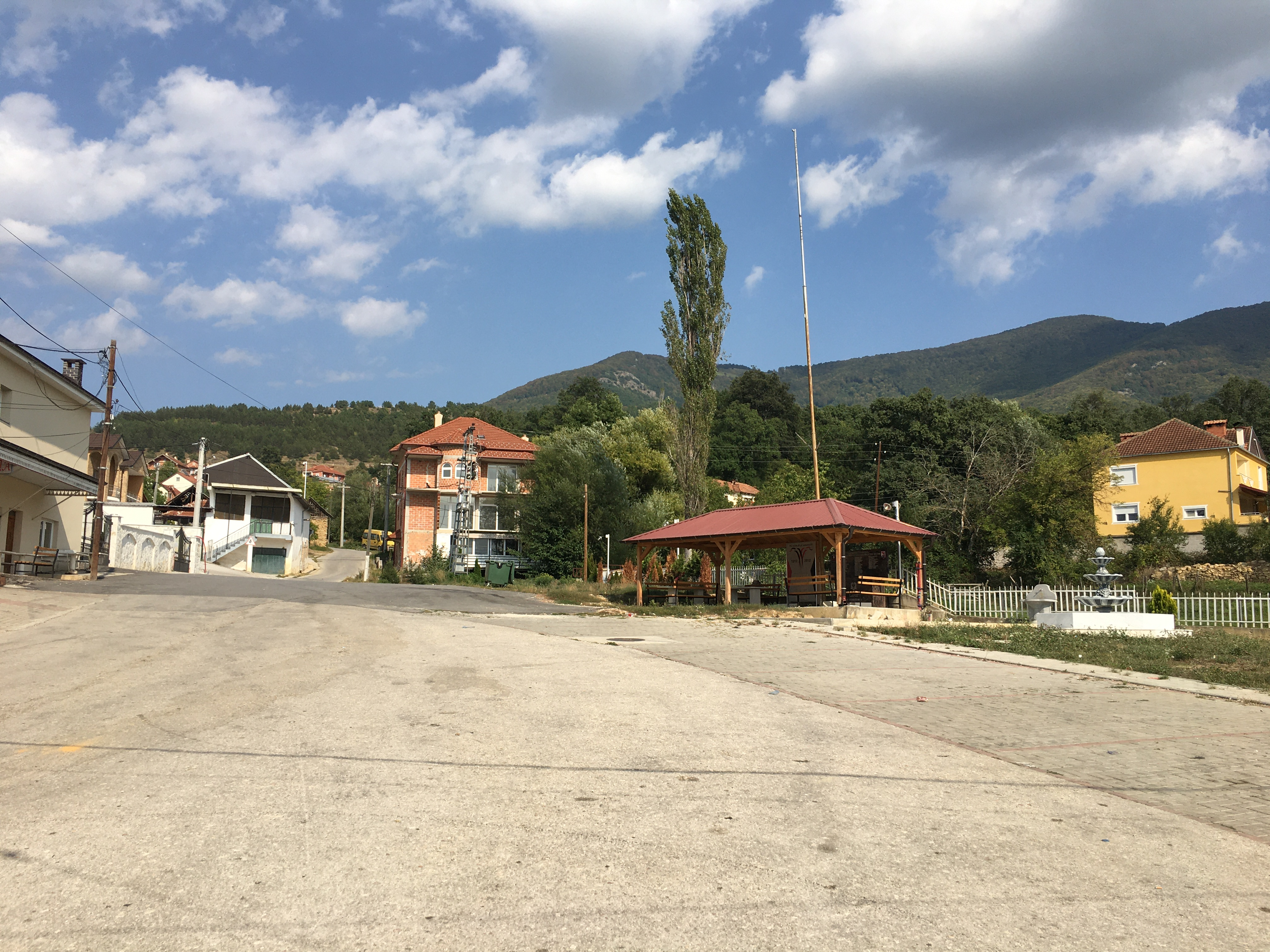
- Center of the village

- Location within North Macedonia
- Coordinates: 41°35′17″N 21°01′51″E
- Country: North Macedonia
- Region: Southwestern
- Municipality: Kičevo

Population (2021)
  - Total: 796
- Time zone: UTC+1 (CET)
  - Summer (DST): UTC+2 (CEST)
- Car plates: KI
- Website: .

Srbica (Macedonian: Србица, Albanian: Sërbicë) is a village in the municipality of Kičevo, North Macedonia. It used to be the largest village of the former municipality of Oslomej.

== History ==
After the capture of the village by Partisan forces, 49 Albanians from the village were executed by the incoming communist forces.

== Demographics ==
The village is attested in the 1467/68 Ottoman tax registry (defter) for the Nahiyah of Kırçova. The village had a total of 83 houses, excluding bachelors (mucerred).

According to the 1942 Albanian census, Srbica was inhabited by a total of 1176 Muslim Albanians.

As of the 2021 census, Srbica had 796 residents with the following ethnic composition:

- Albanians 761
- Persons for whom data are taken from administrative sources 35

According to the 2002 census, the village had a total of 1,862 inhabitants. Ethnic groups in the village include:

- Albanians – 1,859
- Others – 3

== Notable people ==
- Hasan Kaleshi, Albanologist and professor at the University of Pristina.
