= Bohumír Bartoněk =

Czech speedway rider

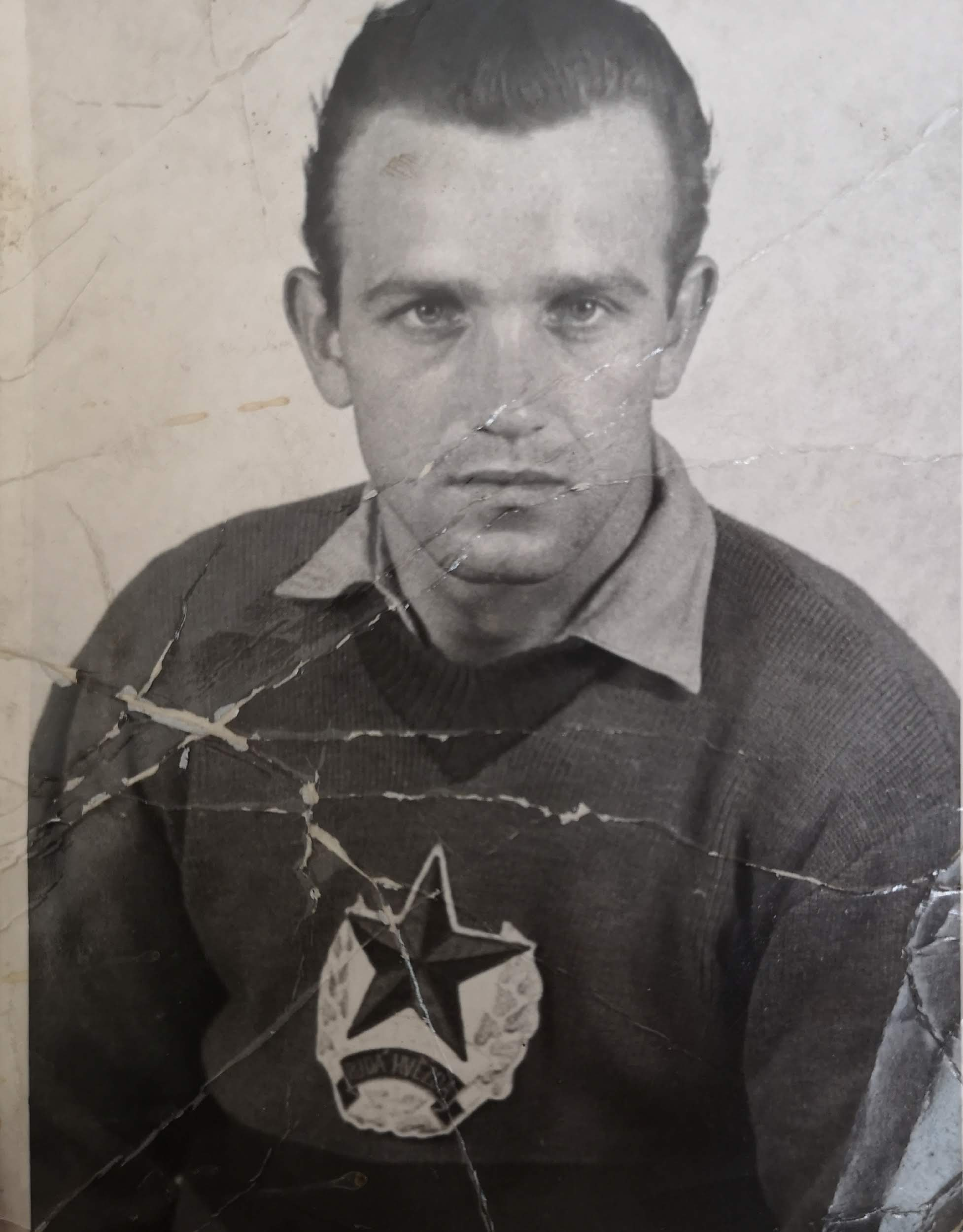
- Born: 10 May 1939 (age 87); Protectorate of Bohemia and Moravia
- Nationality: Czech

Career history

Czechoslovakia
- 1958–1966: Rudá Hvězda Praha

Individual honours
- 1959, 1961: Continental finalist

Team honours
- 1960: Speedway World Team Cup bronze medal
- 1961, 1962: Speedway World Team Cup finalist

Bohumír Bartoněk (born 10 May 1939) is a Czech former international speedway rider.

== Speedway career ==
Bartoněk reached the 1959 Continental Speedway final as part of the 1959 Individual Speedway World Championship.

Bartoněk helped Czechoslovakia reach the final of the inaugural Speedway World Team Cup at the 1960 Speedway World Team Cup, where he won a bronze medal despite not riding because he was the official reserve rider. He was twice a Continental Speedway Finalist in 1959 and 1961.

== World final appearances ==
=== World Team Cup ===
- 1960 - (Sweden) Gothenburg, Ullevi (with František Richter / Luboš Tomíček Sr. / Antonín Kasper Sr.) - 3rd - 15pts (dnr)
- 1961 - (Poland) Wrocław, Olympic Stadium (with Antonín Kasper Sr. / Stanislav Svoboda / Luboš Tomíček Sr.) - 4th - 1pts (7)
- 1962 - (Czechoslovakia) Slaný, Slaný Speedway Stadium (with Bedřich Slaný / Karel Průša / Jaroslav Volf / Luboš Tomíček Sr.) - 4th - 16pts (0)
