= Antonín Kasper Sr. =

Czech speedway rider

- Born: 31 October 1932; Prague, Czechoslovakia
- Died: 12 November 2017 (aged 85)
- Nationality: Czech

Career history

Czechoslovakia
- 1963–1968: Rudá Hvězda Praha

Great Britain
- 1968–1969: Coventry Bees
- 1970: West Ham Hammers

Individual honours
- 1963: Golden Helmet of Pardubice

Team honours
- 1963: Speedway World Team Cup silver medal
- 1960: Speedway World Team Cup bronze medal
- 1968: British League Champion
- 1969: Midland Cup

Antonín Kasper Sr. (31 October 1932 – 12 November 2017) was an international Motorcycle speedway rider from Czechoslovakia. He earned 13 international caps for the Czechoslovakia national speedway team.

== Speedway career ==
Kasper won two medals at the Speedway World Team Cup in 1960 and 1963. He also won the prestigious Golden Helmet of Pardubice in 1963.

In 1967, Kasper was part of the Prague team that toured the United Kingdom and 1968, where he starred alongside Antonín Šváb Sr.

Kasper rode in the top tier of British Speedway, joining the Coventry Bees for the 1968 British League season. He stayed with the Midlands club in 1969 before switching to West Ham Hammers for the 1970 British League season.

== World final appearances ==
=== World Team Cup ===
- 1960 - (Sweden) Gothenburg, Ullevi (with Jaroslav Machač / František Richter / Luboš Tomíček Sr. / Bohumír Bartoněk) - 3rd - 15pts (5)
- 1961 - (Poland) Wrocław, Olympic Stadium (with Luboš Tomíček Sr. / Stanislav Svoboda / Bohumír Bartoněk) - 4th - 12pts (4)
- 1963 - (Austria) Vienna, Stadion Wien (with Stanislav Kubíček / Miroslav Šmíd / Luboš Tomíček Sr. - 2nd - 27pts (10)
- 1968 - (England) London, Wembley Stadium (with Luboš Tomíček Sr. / Jaroslav Volf / Jan Holub I) - 4th' - 7pts (3)

=== Individual Ice Speedway World Championship ===
- 1966 - (Soviet Union) 2 rounds, 7th - 30pts
- 1968 - (Soviet Union) 2 rounds, 7th - 33pts
- 1969 - (West Germany) Inzell, 6th - 9pts
- 1970 - (Sweden) Nässjö, 14th - 3pts

== Family ==
Kasper's son Antonín Jr. (1962-2006) was also an international speedway rider.
