= Stanislav Kubíček =

Czech speedway rider

- Born: 23 May 1940 (age 86); České Budějovice, Protectorate of Bohemia and Moravia
- Nationality: Czech

Career history

Czechoslovakia
- 1961–1962: KV České Budějovice

Individual honours
- 1974, 1976: World Long Track finalist

Team honours
- 1963: Speedway World Team Cup silver medal

Stanislav Kubíček (born 23 May 1940) is a Czech former speedway rider.

== Speedway career ==
Kubíček reached the final of the Speedway World Team Cup in the 1963 Speedway World Team Cup. He has also reached the final of the Individual Speedway Long Track World Championship on two occasions in 1974 and 1976.

Like many Czech riders of the time, the Czechsolovak authorities rarely allowed riders to compete for British league teams, but they did allow club sides such as Prague to tour the United Kingdom, which allowed Kubíček to race in Britain in 1967.

== World final appearances ==
=== World Team Cup ===
- 1963 – (Austria) Vienna, Stadion Vienna (with Antonín Kasper Sr. / Miroslav Šmíd / Luboš Tomíček Sr. - 2nd - 27pts (7)

=== World Longtrack Championship ===
- 1974 – (West Germany) Scheeßel 16th - 2 pts
- 1976 – (Czech Republic) Mariánské Lázně 17th - 1pt

=== Individual Ice Speedway World Championship ===
- 1966 – (Soviet Union) 2 rounds, 8th - 27 pts
- 1967 – (Soviet Union) 3 rounds, 10th - 30 pts
- 1968 – (Soviet Union) 2 rounds, 14th - 13pts
- 1970 – (Sweden) Nässjö, 15th - 1pt
- 1974 – (Sweden) Nässjö, 11th – 5pts
- 1975 – (Soviet Union) Moscow, 15th – 5pts
- 1976 – (Netherlands) Assen, 11th – 9pts
