= Luboš Tomíček Sr. =

Czech speedway rider

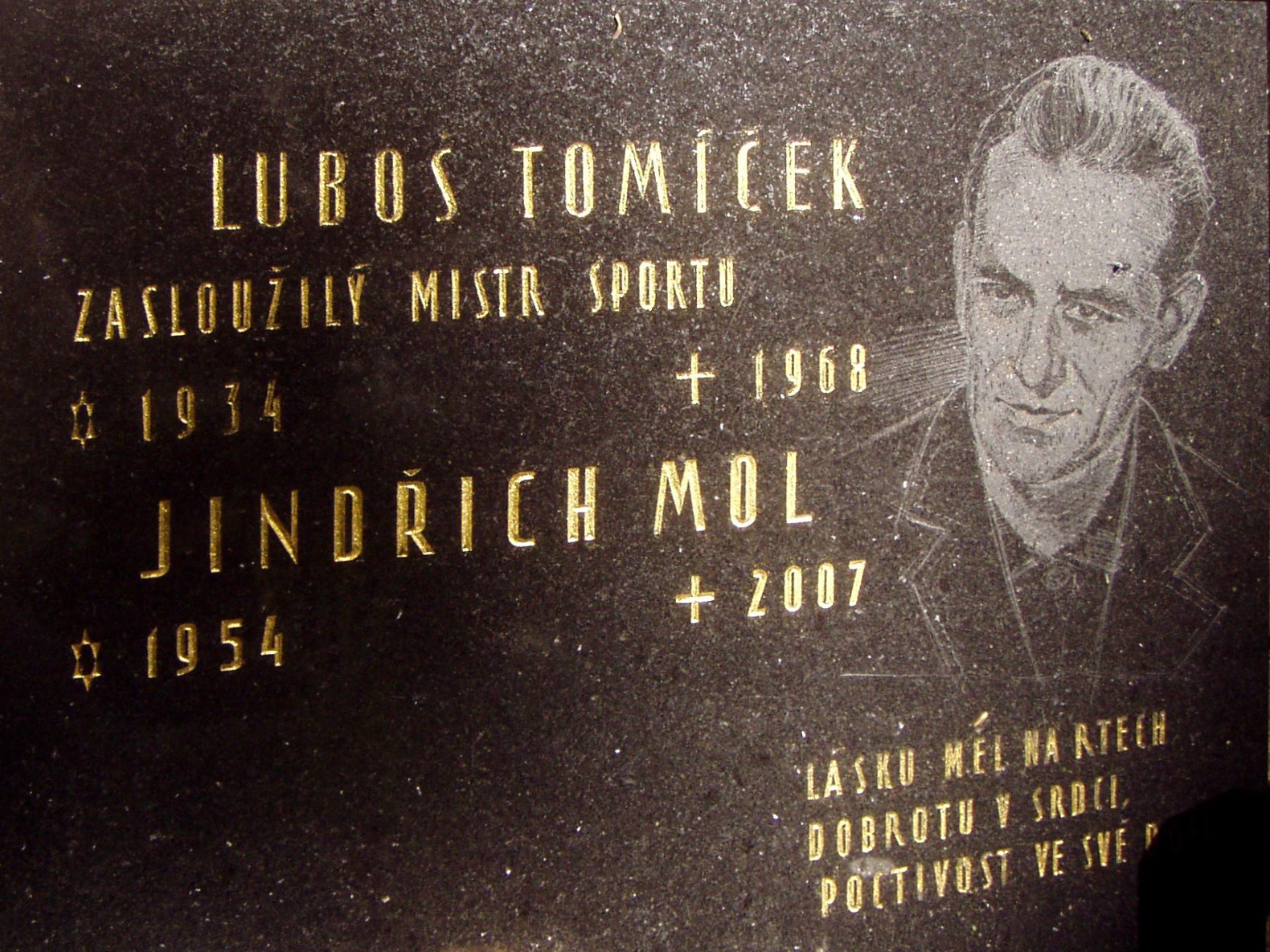
- Grave of Luboš Tomíček Sr.
- Born: 16 August 1934; Czechoslovakia
- Died: 21 October 1968 (aged 34); Pardubice, Czechoslovakia
- Nationality: Czech

Career history

Czechoslovakia
- 1958-1968: Rudá Hvězda Praha

Individual honours
- 1961, 1962, 1963, 1964, 1965: Czechoslovak champion
- 1964: Speedway World Championship finalist

Luboš Tomíček, Sr. (16 August 1934 – 21 October 1968) was a Czech speedway rider.

== Speedway career ==
Tomíček reached the final of the Speedway World Championship in the 1965 Individual Speedway World Championship. He was also the captain of the Czechoslovak team and champion of Czechoslovakia five times from 1961 until 1965 after winning the Czechoslovak Championship.

Like many Czech riders of the time, the Czechoslovak authorities rarely allowed riders to compete for British league teams but they did allow club sides such as Prague to tour the United Kingdom, which allowed Tomíček to race in Britain in 1967, where he was captained the Prague team.

During the 1968 Golden Helmet of Pardubice, Tomíček was killed in an accident after falling directly under the wheels of the speedway rider behind him. An annual memorial event has been held in his memory since.

== World final appearances ==
=== Individual World Championship ===
- 1965 – (England) London, Wembley Stadium – 16th – 2pts

=== World Team Cup ===
- 1960 - (Sweden) Gothenburg, Ullevi (with Jaroslav Machač / František Richter / Antonín Kasper Sr.) - 3rd - 15pts (4)
- 1961 - (Poland) Wrocław, Olympic Stadium (with Antonín Kasper Sr. / Stanislav Svoboda / Bohumír Bartoněk) - 4th - 12pts (7)
- 1962 - (Czechoslovakia) Slaný, Slaný Speedway Stadium (with Bedřich Slaný / Karel Průša / Jaroslav Volf / Bohumír Bartoněk) - 4th - 16pts (7)
- 1963 - (Austria) Vienna, Stadion Wien (with Stanislav Kubíček / Miroslav Šmíd / Antonín Kasper Sr. - 2nd - 27pts (5)
- 1968 - (England) London, Wembley Stadium (with Antonín Kasper Sr. / Jaroslav Volf] / Jan Holub I) - 4th' - 7pts (2)

== Family ==
Tomíček's grandson Luboš Jr. (born 1986) was also an international speedway rider.

== See also ==
- Rider deaths in motorcycle speedway
