= Broadbent =

- Pronunciation: English: /ˈbrɔːdbɛnt/
- Language: English

Origin
- Language: English
- Derivation: " brad " (broad) + "beonet" (bent grass/rushes/reeds)
- Meaning: "broad, bent rushes/reeds"

Other names
- Variant form: Brodbent

Broadbent is an Old English toponymic surname deriving from the location 'Broadbent' near Oldham, Lancashire, describing "broad, bent rushes or reeds".

Notable people with the surname include:

- Adele Broadbent (born 1968), New Zealand children's author
- Alan Broadbent (born 1947), New Zealand–born jazz pianist and composer
- Albert Broadbent (1934–2006), English footballer
- Albert Broadbent (1867–1912), English activist for vegetarianism, writer, lecturer and restauretur
- Ambrose B. Broadbent (1885–1952), American lawyer and politician
- Anne Broadbent, Canadian mathematician
- Annie Broadbent (1908–1996), British artistic gymnast
- Arthur Broadbent (1879–1958), English cricketer
- Benjamin Broadbent (disambiguation), several people
- Betty Broadbent (1909–1983), American woman famous for having more than 550 tattoos
- Bob Broadbent (1924–1993), English cricketer
- Christopher Bowers-Broadbent (born 1945), English organist and composer
- Dan Broadbent (born 1985), English cricketer
- Daniel Broadbent (born 1990), British footballer
- Donald Broadbent (1926–1993), English psychologist
- Edith Hacon née Broadbent (1875–1952) Scottish suffragist from Dornoch, a World War One nursing volunteer, as well as an international socialite.
- Edward Broadbent (disambiguation), several people
- Edmund Hamer Broadbent (1861–1945) English missionary and author
- Ewen Broadbent (1924–1993), British civil servant
- Frank Broadbent (1909–1983), English architect
- Gary Broadbent (born 1976) English rugby league player
- George Robert Broadbent (1863–1947), Australian cyclist and map publisher
- Graham Broadbent (born 1965), British film producer
- Harry Broadbent (disambiguation), several people
- Holly Broadbent Sr. (1894–1977), American orthodontist and father of Holly Broadbent Jr.
- Holly Broadbent Jr. (1928–2009), American orthodontist and son of Holly Broadbent Sr.
- Hydeia Broadbent (1984–2024), American HIV activist
- Jack Broadbent (rugby league) (born 2000), English rugby league footballer
- Jack Broadbent (musician) (born 1988), British blues rock guitarist, singer, and songwriter
- Jane Broadbent (born 1952), British academic
- Jeffrey Broadbent (born 1944), American professor
- Jillian Broadbent (born 1948), Australian businesswoman
- Jim Broadbent (born 1949), English actor
- Jimmy Broadbent (born 1991), English racing driver and social media personality
- Joanne Broadbent (born 1965), Australian cricketer
- John Broadbent (disambiguation), several people
- J. Leslie Broadbent (1891–1935), American religious leader
- Kendall Broadbent (1837–1911) English-Australian zoologist and explorer
- Matthew Broadbent (born 1990), Australian rules footballer
- Michael Broadbent (1927–2020), English wine critic and auctioneer
- Paul Broadbent (born 1968), English rugby league player
- Peter Broadbent (disambiguation), several people
- Punch Broadbent (1892–1971), Canadian ice hockey player
- Reuben Broadbent (1817–1909), American architect
- Richard Broadbent (born 1953), English businessman
- Robert Broadbent (1904–1986), Australian cyclist
- Russell Broadbent (born 1950), Australian politician
- Sylvia M. Broadbent (1932–2015), American anthropologist
- Thomas Broadbent (disambiguation), several people
- William Broadbent (disambiguation), several people
- Walter Broadbent (1868–1951), English physician

== See also ==
- Broadbent Arena, a multi-purpose arena in Louisville, Kentucky
- Broadbent, Oregon
