= 1973 Individual Speedway World Championship =

Motorcycle speedway world championship season

Seasons
- ← 1972 1974 →

The 1973 Individual Speedway World Championship was the 28th edition of the official World Championship to determine the world champion rider.

The 1973 World Final was won by Polish rider Jerzy Szczakiel following a run-off in with defending champion Ivan Mauger after both riders had finished on 13 points. On the second lap of the run-off, Mauger fell in turn 3 after trying a risky passing move leaving Szczakiel to win easily. Another Polish rider, Zenon Plech finished third. Rank outsider Szczakiel, who had finished last with no points scored in his only other World Final appearance in Sweden in 1971, rode the meeting of his life and was only beaten in his final two rides before defeating Mauger in the run-off.

The final, held at the Silesian Stadium in Chorzów, Poland, is believed to have been held in front of the largest crowd in world speedway history, estimated to be around 130,000, though some reports put the size of the crowd as anywhere from 90,000 to 120,000. The previous record for a final was 95,000 during the 1938 Individual Speedway World Championship at Wembley.

== Format changes ==
The format of the Championship changed for the 1973 event. This time the Polish riders were allowed five places in the World Final to be held in Poland. All other nations had to go through the European Final route to provide the remaining 11 riders for the World Final.

== First round ==
=== British/Commonwealth preliminaries ===
- Riders progress to British/Commonwealth qualifiers

Date	Venue	Winner	2nd	3rd
29 April	Arlington Stadium, Eastbourne	Gordon Kennett	Paul Gachet	Bobby McNeil
29 April	Boston Sports Stadium, Boston	Graeme Stapleton	John Dews	Russ Osborne
2 May	Odsal Stadium, Bradford	Neil Street	Billy Sanders	Rick France
7 May	Earle Street, Crewe	Mitch Graham	Arthur Price	Les Owen
7 May	Birchfield Ladbroke Stadium, Birmingham	Jim Ryman	Bob Paulson	Ted Howgego

== Second round ==
=== Norwegian qualifying ===
- 10 September 1972
- (Norway) Gamle Stadion, Sandefjord
- Top 12 to Nordic qualification 1973

Pos.	Rider	Points
1	Ulf Lövaas	14
2	Dag Lövaas	12
3	Odd Fossengen	11
4	Helge Langli	11
5	Svein Kaasa	9
6	Oyvind S. Berg	9
7	Edgar Stangeland	9
8	Reidar Eide	9
9	Tormod Langli	8
10	Hans Erik Fuglerud	7
11	Johnny Larsen	7
12	Per Hetland	5
13	Svein Lökken	3
14	Kjell Gimre	3
15	Jan Jacobsen	2
16	Öyvind Rökeberg	0

=== Finnish qualifying (top 10) ===
- (Finland) (3 rounds) First (+1 seeded riders) to Nordic qualification 1973
- R1 (? '72, Kärpänen Speedway, Lahti)
- R2 (26 Aug '72, Kärpänen Speedway, Lahti)
- R3 (? '72, Eteläpuisto, Tampere)

Pos.	Rider	Points	Total (best 2)
1	Matti Olin	8+8+0	16
2	Hannu Känkänen	4+6+8	14
3	Kalevi Lahtinen	6+0+6	12
4	Heikki Ahonen	1+3+4	7
5	Kari Vuoristo	3+2+0	5
6	Pekka Paljakka	0+4+0	4
7	Matti Touru	0+0+3	3
8	Tapio Leppasalko	2+1+0	3
9	Jouko Naskali	0+0+2	2
10	Timo Naskali	0+0+1	1

=== Swedish qualifying ===
- Top 8 in each heat to Nordic qualification

(1 May, Gamla Galgberget, Visby)
Pos	Rider	Points
1	Lars Jansson	14
2	Bernt Persson	12
3	Christer Löfqvist	10
4	Jan Simensen	9
5	Sven Nilsson	9
6	Kenneth Selmosson	9
7	Bo Wirebrand	9
8	Karl-Erik Claesson	9
9	Conny Samuelsson	8
10	Håkan Karlsson	7
11	Sören Karlsson	6
12	Bengt Olsson	6
13	Anders Lövgren	4
14	Peter Smith	3
15	Lars Larsson	3
16	Leif Mellberg	2

(1 May, Målilla (Motorbana), Målilla)
Pos	Rider	Points
1	Sören Sjösten	14
2	Bengt Jansson	13
3	Anders Michanek	11
4	Stefan Johansson	11
5	Tommy Johansson	10
6	Leif Johansson	10
7	Bengt Larsson	7
8	Stefan Salmonsson	7
9	Anders Jansson	6
10	Sigvard Johansson	6
11	Roy Dantanus	5
12	Lars-Inge Hultberg	5
13	Tomas Johansson	5
14	Therje Henriksson	4
15	Steve Johansson	4
16	Åke Andersson	2
17	Bertil Andersson	0

(5 May, Motorbanen Hagalund, Lindesberg)
Pos	Rider	Points
1	Hasse Holmqvist	14
2	Tommy Jansson	12
3	Tomas Pettersson	10
4	Stephan Johansson	10
5	Leif Enecrona	9
6	Tommy Nilsson	9
7	Göte Nordin	9
8	Christer Sjösten	8
9	Rolf Johansson	7
10	Åke Dovhed	6
11	Käll Haage	6
12	Lennart Johansson	5
13	Willy Karlsson	4
14	Per-Åke Gerhardsson	4
15	Börje Klingberg	3
16	Hans Johansson	3

=== Continental qualifying ===
- Rider progress to Continental quarter-finals

Date	Venue	Winner	2nd	3rd
29 April	(Socialist Federal Republic of Yugoslavia) Mladost Stadum, Prelog	(Czechoslovakia) Zdenek Majstr	(Czechoslovakia) Evzen Erban	(Austria) Jozef Haider
6 May	(West Germany) Motodrom Halbemond, Norden	(Czechoslovakia) Jan Hadek	(Czechoslovakia) Jiri Dominik	(Netherlands) Henny Kroeze

=== British/Commonwealth qualifiers ===
- Top riders progress to British/Commonwealth semi-finals

Date	Venue	Winner	2nd	3rd
12 May	King's Lynn Stadium, King's Lynn	John Louis	Terry Betts	Malcolm Simmons
14 May	Reading Stadium, Reading	Martin Ashby	Mick Bell	Geoff Curtis
16 May	Wimborne Road, Poole	Pete Smith	Ray Wilson	Terry Betts
17 May	Owlerton Stadium, Sheffield	Jim McMillan	Arnie Haley	Doug Wyer
18 May	Monmore Green, Wolverhampton	George Hunter	Ray Wilson	Gary Peterson
18 May	Hackney Wick Stadium, London	Terry Betts	Bob Valentine	Barry Thomas
19 May	The Shay, Halifax	John Boulger	Eric Boocock	Bill Andrew
19 May	Dudley Wood Stadium, Dudley	John Louis	Bruce Cribb	Colin Gooddy
19 May	Abbey Stadium, Swindon	Jim McMillan	Doug Wyer	Tony Davey
19 May	Hyde Road, Manchester	Ivan Mauger	Chris Pusey	Eric Broadbelt
21 May	County Ground Stadium, Exeter	Ivan Mauger	Martin Ashby	Bob Coles
22 May	Leicester Stadium, Leicester	John Boulger	Ray Wilson	Bob Kilby
23 May	Somerton Park, Newport	Eric Boocock	Roy Trigg	Gary Peterson
24 May	Wimbledon Stadium, London	Peter Collins	Norman Hunter	Ian Turner
24 May	Oxford Stadium, Oxford	Bob Kilby	Malcolm Ballard	Eric Boocock
25 May	Cliftonhill, Coatbridge	Mick Bell	John Boulger	Chris Julian
26 May	Brandon Stadium, Coventry	Nigel Boocock	Ray Wilson	Bob Kilby
29 May	Foxhall Stadium, Ipswich	Ivan Mauger	Tony Davey	Mick Bell

== Third round ==
=== Continental quarter-finals ===
- Top 32 to Continental semi-finals

Date	Venue	Winner	2nd	3rd
10 May	(Czechoslovakia) Svítkov Stadium, Pardubice	(Soviet Union) Vladimir Zapleshny	(Czechoslovakia) Jiří Štancl	(Czechoslovakia) Miloslav Verner
20 May	(Hungary) Borsod Volán Stadion, Miskolc	(Soviet Union) Grigory Khlinovsky	(Soviet Union) Viktor Trofimov	(Soviet Union) Aleksandr Pavlov
20 May	(West Germany) Breitenthal Stadium, Krumbach	(Czechoslovakia) Milan Špinka	(Soviet Union) Vladimir Paznikov	(Czechoslovakia) Jan Holub I
20 May	(Socialist Federal Republic of Yugoslavia) Matija Gubec Stadium, Krško	(Soviet Union) Anatoly Kuzmin	(Soviet Union) Vladimir Gordeev	(Czechoslovakia) Petr Ondrašík

=== British/Commonwealth semi-finals ===
- 5 June
- (England) Leicester Stadium, Leicester
- Top 8 to British/Commonwealth final

Pos.	Rider	Points
1	(New Zealand) Ivan Mauger	14
2	(England) John Louis	13
3	(England) Chris Pusey	12
4	(Scotland) Jim Mcmillan	10
5	(England) Rick France	9
6	(England) Peter Collins	9
7	(Australia) Bob Valentine	8
8	(England) Tony Davey	8
9	(Australia) Garry Middleton	8
10	(England) Alan Wilkinson	7
11	(England) Doug Wyer	7
12	(England) Arnie Haley	6
13	(Australia) Bob Humphreys	6
14	(England) Eric Broadbelt	2
15	(England) Bob Kilby	1
16	(England) Nigel Boocock	0

- 7 June
- (England) Wimbledon Stadium, London
- Top 8 to British final

Pos.	Rider	Points
1	(Australia) John Boulger	14
2	(England) Martin Ashby	13
3	(England) Eric Boocock	10
4	(England) Malcolm Simmons	10
5	(England) Ray Wilson	10
6	(England) Terry Betts	10
7	(England) Mick Bell	9
8	(England) Pete Smith	9
9	(England) Roy Trigg	7
10	(England) Gary Peterson	5
11	(England) Barry Thomas	5
12	(England) Malcolm Ballard	5
13	(England) Geoff Maloney	4
14	(Scotland) George Hunter	3
15	(New Zealand) Bruce Cribb	3
16	(New Zealand) Bill Andrew	1

=== Nordic qualification ===
- Top 5 from each meeting to Nordic final

(17 May, (Sweden) Gubbängens IP, Stockholm)
Pos	Rider	Points
1	(Sweden) Bengt Jansson	15
2	(Sweden) Anders Michanek	14
3	(Sweden) Göte Nordin	13
4	(Norway) Dag Lövaas	12
5	(Sweden) Lars Jansson	11
6	(Sweden) Karl-Erik Claesson	9
7	(Sweden) Kenneth Selmosson	8
8	(Sweden) Sören Sjösten	8
9	(Denmark) Arne Andreasen	7
10	(Denmark) Erik Tillgaard	6
11	(Sweden) Sven Nilsson	4
12	(Norway) Hans Fuglerud	4
13	(Norway) Svein Lökken	4
14	(Denmark) Jörn Mogensen	3
15	(Sweden) Rolf Johansson (res)	1
16	(Finland) Heikki Ahonen	1
17	(Norway) Öystein Mellerud	0

(27 May, (Norway) Grenland Arena, Skien)
Pos	Rider	Points
1	(Sweden) Bernt Persson	15
2	(Sweden) Tommy Jansson	13
3	(Norway) Odd Fossengen	12
4	(Norway) Öyvind Berg	12
5	(Sweden) Tommy Johansson	11
6	(Sweden) Leif Enecrona	11
7	(Sweden) Tomas Pettersson	8
8	(Denmark) Krause Kjaer	8
9	(Sweden) Bengt Larsson	7
10	(Norway) Ulf Lövaas	7
11	(Norway) Helge Langli	5
12	(Denmark) Preben Bollerup	4
13	(Sweden) Stefan Johansson	3
14	(Sweden) Stefan Salmonsson	3

(27 May, (Denmark) Selskov Stadium, Hillerod)
Pos	Rider	Points
1	(Denmark) Ole Olsen	15
2	(Sweden) Christer Löfqvist	14
3	(Sweden) Jan Simensen	13
4	(Sweden) Hasse Holmqvist	11
5	(Sweden) Christer Sjösten	11
6	(Norway) Edgar Stangeland	11
7	(Sweden) Bo Wirebrand	7
8	(Norway) Jan Terje Gravningen	7
9	(Sweden) Stephan Johansson	7
10	(Denmark) Kurt Bögh	6
11	(Sweden) Tommy Nilsson	6
12	(Denmark) Bent Nörregaard-Jensen	4
13	(Sweden) Leif Johansson	3
14	(Norway) Tormod Langli	2
15	(Norway) Per Herland	1
16	(Finland) Matti Olin	1

== Fourth round ==
=== Continental semi-finals ===
- 2 June
- (West Germany) Rodenbach Motodrom, Rodenbach
- Top 8 to Continental final

Pos.	Rider	Points
1	(Soviet Union) Grigory Khlinovsky	13
2	(Soviet Union) Valerij Gordeev	13
3	(Czechoslovakia) Václav Verner	12
4	(Czechoslovakia) Milan Špinka	12
5	(Soviet Union) Vladimir Paznikov	12
6	(Soviet Union) Viktor Trofimov	7
7	(Soviet Union) Alexander Pavlov	7
8	(West Germany) Josef Angermüller	7
9	(Soviet Union) Oleg Dziadyk	7
10	(Czechoslovakia) Jan Klokocka	7
11	(West Germany) Manfred Poschenreider	6
12	(Czechoslovakia) Jan Holub I	6
13	(Soviet Union) Georgij Ivanov	4
14	(Czechoslovakia) Miroslav Rosulek	3
15	(Soviet Union) Vladimir Tchistiakov (res)	1
16	(Soviet Union) Yury Dubinin	0
17	(Soviet Union) Petr Safarik	0
18	(West Germany) Otto Barth (res)	0

- 2 June
- (Czechoslovakia) Slaný Speedway Stadium, Slaný
- Top 8 to Continental final

Pos.	Rider	Points
1	(Soviet Union) Vladimir Gordeev	15
2	(Czechoslovakia) Jiří Štancl	13
3	(Soviet Union) Anatolij Kuzmin	12
4	(Soviet Union) Vladimir Zaplechny	11
5	(Czechoslovakia) Zdeněk Majstr	11
6	(Czechoslovakia) Karel Vobornik	10
7	(Czechoslovakia) Miroslav Verner	10
8	(Czechoslovakia) Petr Ondrašík	8
9	(Czechoslovakia) Petr Kucera	6
10	(Soviet Union) Nikolai Aksjonov	5
11	(Soviet Union) Gregorij Markatanov	4
12	(Netherlands) Henny Kroeze	4
13	(Soviet Union) Nikolaj Kornev	4
14	(East Germany) Gerhard Uhlenbrock	3
15	(Austria) Josef Bössner	2
16	(Hungary) Pal Pereny	1

=== British/Commonwealth Final ===
- 21 June 1973
- (England) Owlerton Stadium, Sheffield
- First 8 to British-Nordic Final

Placing	Rider	Total	1	2	3	4	5	6	7	8	9	10	11	12	13	14	15	16	17	18	19	20	Pts	Pos	21
1	(England) (15) Ray Wilson	15				3			3			3						3	3				15	1	
2	(Australia) (10) Bob Valentine	12			3			3						2			2		2				12	2	3
3	(England) (13) Peter Collins	12				2	3							3		2					2		12	3	2
4	(Australia) (3) John Boulger	12	2						1				3				3				3		12	4	1
5	(New Zealand) (2) Ivan Mauger	10	3					1				3				3				T			10	5	
6	(England) (7) Eric Boocock	9		2					2					0	3					2			9	6	
7	(England) (8) Tony Davey	9		3						2			2			1			1				9	7	
8	(England) (16) Rick France	9				1				2	2						1			3			9	8	
9	(England) (6) John Louis	7		F				0			3							3			1		7	9	
10	(England) (4) Martin Ashby	6	1							3				1				1				0	6	10	
11	(Australia) (5) Garry Middleton	5		1			0					1					0					3	5	11	
12	(England) (14) Peter Smith	5				0		2					1		1							1	5	12	
13	(England) (9) Terry Betts	4			1		2						F					F		1			4	13	
14	(England) (11) Mick Bell	4			2				0		0					0						2	4	14	
15	(England) (1) Malcolm Simmons	2	0				1				1				0				0				2	15	
16	(Scotland) (12) Jim McMillan	2			0					0		0			2						0		2	16	
R1	(England) (R1) Chris Pusey	0																					0	R1	
Placing	Rider	Total	1	2	3	4	5	6	7	8	9	10	11	12	13	14	15	16	17	18	19	20	Pts	Pos	21

m - exclusion for exceeding two minute time allowance • t - exclusion for touching the tapes • x - other exclusion • e - retired or mechanical failure • f - fell • ns - non-starter • nc - non-classify

gate A - inside	gate B	gate C	gate D - outside

=== Nordic Final ===
- 6 June 1973
- (Sweden) Norrköping Motorstadion, Norrköping
- First 8 to British-Nordic Final

Placing	Rider	Total	1	2	3	4	5	6	7	8	9	10	11	12	13	14	15	16	17	18	19	20	Pts	Pos	21
1	(Denmark) (6) Ole Olsen	15		3				3			3							3			3		15	1	
2	(Sweden) (5) Bengt Jansson	14		2			3					3					3					3	14	2	
3	(Sweden) (7) Anders Michanek	13		1					3					3	3					3			13	3	
4	(Sweden) (8) Bernt Persson	12		0						3			3			3			3				12	4	
5	(Sweden) (3) Tommy Jansson	10	3						1				2				2				2		10	5	
6	(Sweden) (4) Jan Simensen	9	1							2				2				2				2	9	6	
7	(Norway) (13) Reidar Eide	9				3	2							1		2					1		9	7	
8	(Sweden) (11) Göte Nordin	8			3				2		1					1						1	8	8	3
9	(Sweden) (1) Christer Löfqvist	8	2				1				2				1				2				8	9	F
10	(Sweden) (9) Lars Jansson	5			2		0						1					0		2			5	10	
11	(Sweden) (12) Christer Sjösten	4			F					E		2			2						0		4	11	
12	(Norway) (10) Øyvind S. Berg	4			1			1						0			1		1				4	12	
13	(Norway) (2) Dag Lovaas	3	F					2				1				0				0			3	13	
14	(Sweden) (15) Hasse Holmqvist	3				2			0			0						1	0				3	14	
15	(Sweden) (16) Tommy Johansson	1				1				E	E						-			-			1	15	
16	(Norway) (14) Odd Fossengen	0				0		0					0		0							0	0	16	
R1	(Sweden) (R1) Leif Enecrona	1															0			1			1	R1	
Placing	Rider	Total	1	2	3	4	5	6	7	8	9	10	11	12	13	14	15	16	17	18	19	20	Pts	Pos	21

m - exclusion for exceeding two minute time allowance • t - exclusion for touching the tapes • x - other exclusion • e - retired or mechanical failure • f - fell • ns - non-starter • nc - non-classify

gate A - inside	gate B	gate C	gate D - outside

== Fifth round ==
=== British/Commonwealth/Nordic Final ===
- 1 August 1973
- (England) Brandon Stadium, Coventry
- First 8 to European Final

Placing	Rider	Total	1	2	3	4	5	6	7	8	9	10	11	12	13	14	15	16	17	18	19	20	Pts	Pos	21
1	(Sweden) (13) Anders Michanek	14				3	3							2		3					3		14	1	
2	(Denmark) (8) Ole Olsen	11		T						3			3			2			3				11	2	
3	(New Zealand) (4) Ivan Mauger	11	1							2				3				3				2	11	3	
4	(Sweden) (2) Tommy Jansson	10	2					3				2				1				2			10	4	
5	(Australia) (7) John Boulger	10		2					3					1	3					1			10	5	
6	(England) (11) Peter Collins	9			3				2		3					0						1	9	6	
7	(England) (16) Ray Wilson	9				E				1	2						3			3			9	7	
8	(Sweden) (15) Bernt Persson	9				2			E			3						2	2				9	8	
9	(Australia) (1) Bob Valentine	8	3				2				0				2				1				8	9	
10	(Norway) (6) Reidar Eide	5		1				2			1							1			0		5	10	
11	(Sweden) (14) Göte Nordin	5				1		1					2		1							0	5	11	
12	(Sweden) (10) Bengt Jansson	3			2			F						F			1		E				3	12	
13	(Sweden) (9) Jan Simensen	2			1		0						1					0		0			2	13	
14	(England) (12) Tony Davey	1			0					0		0			0						1		1	14	
15	(England) (3) Eric Boocock	0	0						T				-				-				-		0	15	
DQ	(England) (5) John Louis	10		3			1					1					2					3	10	DQ	
R1	(Australia) (R1) Garry Middleton	2											T				0				2		2	R1	
Placing	Rider	Total	1	2	3	4	5	6	7	8	9	10	11	12	13	14	15	16	17	18	19	20	Pts	Pos	21

m - exclusion for exceeding two minute time allowance • t - exclusion for touching the tapes • x - other exclusion • e - retired or mechanical failure • f - fell • ns - non-starter • nc - non-classify

gate A - inside	gate B	gate C	gate D - outside

=== Continental Final ===
- 23 June 1973
- (Soviet Union) Leningrad Speedway Stadium, Leningrad
- First 8 to European Final plus 1 reserve

Placing	Rider	Total	1	2	3	4	5	6	7	8	9	10	11	12	13	14	15	16	17	18	19	20	Pts	Pos	21
1	(Soviet Union) (15) Valery Gordeev	13				3			3			2						2	3				13	1	
2	(Soviet Union) (4) Grigory Khlinovsky	12	2							3				3				1				3	12	2	
3	(Soviet Union) (16) Vladimir Zapleshny	12				2				2	2						3			3			12	3	
4	(Soviet Union) (6) Vladimir Gordeev	11.5		3				3			1/2							3			2		11.5	4	
5	(Soviet Union) (1) Viktor Trofimov	11.5	3				3				1/2				3				2				11.5	5	
6	(Soviet Union) (12) Aleksandr Pavlov	11			3					0		3			2						3		11	6	
7	(Soviet Union) (8) Anatoly Kuzmin	10		2						1			3			3			1				10	7	
8	(Soviet Union) (11) Vladimir Paznikov	10			1				2		3					2						2	10	8	
9	(Czechoslovakia) (9) Jiri Stancl	8			2		2						2					0		2			8	9	
10	(Czechoslovakia) (3) Petr Ondrašík	5	1						1				0				2				1		5	10	
11	(Czechoslovakia) (14) Milan Špinka	5				1		2					1		X							1	5	11	
12	(Czechoslovakia) (13) Václav Verner	4				0	1							2		1					0		4	12	
13	(Czechoslovakia) (5) Miloslav Verner	3		1			0					1					1					0	3	13	
14	(West Germany) (7) Josef Angermüller	3		0					0					1	1					1			3	14	
15	(Czechoslovakia) (10) Karol Vobornik	1			0			1						0			0		0				1	15	
16	(Czechoslovakia) (2) Petr Kučera	0	0					0				0				0				0			0	16	
Placing	Rider	Total	1	2	3	4	5	6	7	8	9	10	11	12	13	14	15	16	17	18	19	20	Pts	Pos	21

m - exclusion for exceeding two minute time allowance • t - exclusion for touching the tapes • x - other exclusion • e - retired or mechanical failure • f - fell • ns - non-starter • nc - non-classify

gate A - inside	gate B	gate C	gate D - outside

== Sixth round ==
=== Polish qualifiers ===
- The top five finishers in the Golden Helmet, during the 1973 Polish speedway season gained nominations for the World final.

=== European Final ===
- 19 August 1973
- (West Germany) Abensberger Stadion, Abensberg
- First 11 to World Final plus 1 reserve

Placing	Rider	Total	1	2	3	4	5	6	7	8	9	10	11	12	13	14	15	16	17	18	19	20	Pts	Pos	21
1	(Sweden) (7) Anders Michanek	15		3					3					3	3					3			15	1	
2	(New Zealand) (5) Ivan Mauger	14		2			3					3					3					3	14	2	
3	(Soviet Union) (13) Vladimir Paznikov	12				3	2							1		3					3		12	3	
4	(Sweden) (4) Bernt Persson	10	0							3				2				3				2	10	4	
5	(Soviet Union) (9) Vladimir Zapleshny	9			3		0						2					2		2			9	5	
6	(England) (16) Peter Collins	9				2				2	3						2			E			9	6	
7	(Soviet Union) (14) Valery Gordeev	8				F		3					3		1							1	8	7	
8	(Denmark) (11) Ole Olsen	8			2				2		2					2						-	8	8	
9	(Soviet Union) (1) Grigory Khlinovsky	7	1				1				0				2				3				7	9	
10	(Australia) (3) John Boulger	7	3						1				1				1				1		7	10	
11	(England) (2) Ray Wilson	6	2					2				F				1				1			6	11	
12	(Sweden) (6) Bengt Jansson	6		1				1			1							1			2		6	12	
13	(Soviet Union) (15) Aleksandr Pavlov	4				1			0			2						0	1				4	13	
14	(Czechoslovakia) (8) Jiri Stancl	2		0						0			0			0			2				2	14	
15	(Soviet Union) (12) Viktor Trofimov	2			0					1		1			0						0		2	15	
16	(Soviet Union) (10) Anatoly Kuzmin	1			1			0						0			0		0				1	16	
R1	(East Germany) (R1) Otto Barth	0																				0	0	R1	
Placing	Rider	Total	1	2	3	4	5	6	7	8	9	10	11	12	13	14	15	16	17	18	19	20	Pts	Pos	21

m - exclusion for exceeding two minute time allowance • t - exclusion for touching the tapes • x - other exclusion • e - retired or mechanical failure • f - fell • ns - non-starter • nc - non-classify

gate A - inside	gate B	gate C	gate D - outside

== World Final ==
=== Final Controversy ===
The Final was surrounded by controversy, with decisions made by Georg Traunspurger, the referee assigned to the meeting by the FIM, seeming to favour the Polish riders. One of his decisions was to have 2nd reserve Andrzej Wyglenda of Poland race in Heat 16 in front of 1st reserve Tommy Jansson of Sweden (after Bernt Persson of Sweden was unable to ride), making it four Polish riders in the race. In the race, second placed Edward Jancarz, who led for the first three laps, seemed to let Zenon Plech take the lead in the final turn, allowing Plech, who had more points at that stage of the meeting, to collect another three points for the win.

His most controversial decision was to exclude Soviet rider Grigory Khlinovsky from heat 19. Khlinovsky had attempted to pass on the inside of Zenon Plech for the lead going into the back straight of the last lap. As he was passed by the Russian, Plech lost control of his bike and fell. Despite protests from riders and the Soviet officials Khlinovsky was excluded and England's Peter Collins, who was in 3rd place at the time of the crash, was awarded the heat win, Plech, who didn't actually finish the race, was awarded 2nd. The result of the two points he gained for second place allowed Plech to finish a clear third in the championship. Had Khlinovsky been the winner of the heat, he would have ended on 13 points, which would have put him in the run-off for the title with Szczakiel and Mauger.

British television commentator Dave Lanning called the ruling "The craziest piece of speedway regulations in the history of World Championship racing", before adding that "It seems to me that the authorities here in Katowice are making up the rules to suit themselves to get their boys a world title."

=== Final result ===
- 2 September 1973
- (Poland) Silesian Stadium, Chorzów
- Referee: (West Germany) Georg Traunspurger

Placing	Rider	Total	1	2	3	4	5	6	7	8	9	10	11	12	13	14	15	16	17	18	19	20	Pts	Pos	21
1	(Poland) (16) Jerzy Szczakiel	13				3				3	3						2			2			13	1	3
2	(New Zealand) (8) Ivan Mauger	13		3						1			3			3			3				13	2	F
3	(Poland) (6) Zenon Plech	12		2				3			2							3			2		12	3	
4	(Denmark) (7) Ole Olsen	11		1					2					3	2					3			11	4	
5	(Soviet Union) (3) Grigory Khlinovsky	10	2						3				2				3				X		10	5	
6	(Soviet Union) (2) Vladimir Paznikov	8	3					1				2				1				1			8	6	
7	(Poland) (4) Paweł Waloszek	8	1							2				1				1				3	8	7	
8	(Soviet Union) (12) Valery Gordeev	7			2					0		1			3						1		7	8	
9	(Poland) (11) Jan Mucha	7			1				1		1					2						2	7	9	
10	(Sweden) (1) Anders Michanek	6	0				3				X				1				2				6	10	
11	(Poland) (9) Edward Jancarz	6			3		1						0					2		0			6	11	
12	(England) (13) Peter Collins	6				1	0							2		0					3		6	12	
13	(Australia) (14) John Boulger	6				2		2					1		0							1	6	13	
14	(England) (5) Ray Wilson	5		F			2					3					0					F	5	14	
15	(Soviet Union) (10) Vladimir Zapleshny	2			0			0						0			1		1				2	15	
16	(Sweden) (15) Bernt Persson	0				F			0			R						-	-				0	16	
R1	(Poland) (R1) Andrzej Wyglenda	0																0					0	R1	
R2	(Sweden) (R2) Tommy Jansson	0																	0				0	R2	
Placing	Rider	Total	1	2	3	4	5	6	7	8	9	10	11	12	13	14	15	16	17	18	19	20	Pts	Pos	21

m - exclusion for exceeding two minute time allowance • t - exclusion for touching the tapes • x - other exclusion • e - retired or mechanical failure • f - fell • ns - non-starter • nc - non-classify

gate A - inside	gate B	gate C	gate D - outside
