= 1974 Individual Speedway World Championship =

Motorcycle speedway world championship season

Seasons
- ← 1973 1975 →

The 1974 Individual Speedway World Championship was the 29th edition of the official World Championship to determine the world champion rider.

Sweden's own Anders Michanek scored a 15-point maximum to claim his only Individual world title in front of a capacity crowd at the Ullevi stadium in Gothenburg. Four time champion Ivan Mauger finished second on 11 points after winning a run-off with Swede Sören Sjösten who also scored 11. With the defending champion Jerzy Szczakiel not qualifying after finishing last in the 2nd Continental Semi-final, the only other World Champion in the field was Denmark's Ole Olsen who suffered a horror night, finishing second in his first ride before falling in his second and not being able to contest the rest of the meeting.

== Format changes ==
The format of the Championship changed for the 1974 event. This time the Swedish riders were allowed five places in the World Final to be held in Sweden. All other nations had to go through the European Final route to provide the remaining 11 riders for the World Final.

== First round ==
=== British/Commonwealth preliminaries ===
- Riders progress to British/Commonwealth qualifying

| Date | Venue | Winner | 2nd | 3rd |
|---|---|---|---|---|
| 1 April | Quibell Park Stadium, Scunthorpe | Reg Luckhurst | Russ Osborne | Mike Hiftle |
| 5 April | Derwent Park, Workington | Alan Cowland | Dave Gatenby | Brian Clark |
| 21 April | Arlington Stadium, Eastbourne | Phil Herne | Mike Sampson | Mike Cake |
| 22 April | Earle Street, Crewe | Carl Glover | Mike Broadbanks | Richard Greer |
| 23 April | Ellesmere Port Stadium, Ellesmere Port | Barry Crowson | Richard May | Ken Eyre |

== Second round ==
=== Continental qualifying ===
- Riders progress to Continental quarter-finals

| Date | Venue | Winner | 2nd | 3rd |
|---|---|---|---|---|
| 1 May | (West Germany) Hansa Stadium, Bremen | (Czechoslovakia) Jan Klokočka | (West Germany) Egon Müller | (Netherlands) Henny Kroeze |
| 5 May | (Italy) La Favorita, Sarego | (Hungary) Sandor Csatho | (West Germany) Christoph Betzl | (Bulgaria) Angel Eftimov |

=== British/Commonwealth qualifying ===
| Date | Venue | Winner | 2nd | 3rd |
|---|---|---|---|---|
| 29 April | County Ground Stadium, Exeter | Ivan Mauger | Barry Briggs | Phil Herne |
| 30 April | Leicester Stadium, Leicester | Terry Betts | Malcolm Simmons | Dave Jessup |
| 1 May | Wimborne Road, Poole | Peter Collins | Dave Jessup | Eric Broadbelt |
| 1 May | The Boulevard, Hull | John Boulger | Nigel Boocock | Jim McMillan |
| 2 May | Owlerton Stadium, Sheffield | Bob Valentine | Bob Paulson | Ray Wilson |
| 2 May | Oxford Stadium, Oxford | Bob Kilby | Malcolm Simmons | Eric Boocock |
| 2 May | Foxhall Stadium, Ipswich | John Louis | Nigel Boocock | Billy Sanders |
| 4 May | King's Lynn Stadium, King's Lynn | Malcolm Simmons | Ivan Mauger | Tony Davey |
| 4 May | The Shay, Halifax | Eric Boocock | Kevin Holden | Rick France |
| 9 May | Wimbledon Stadium, London | Barry Briggs | Neil Cameron | Richard May |
| 10 May | Monmore Green, Wolverhampton | Billy Sanders | Rick France | George Hunter |
| 10 May | Somerton Park, Newport | Phil Crump | Ray Wilson | Geoff Mudge |
| 10 May | Hackney Wick Stadium, London | John Louis | Barry Thomas | Bob Kilby |
| 11 May | Dudley Wood Stadium, Dudley | Billy Sanders | Bruce Cribb | John Boulger |
| 11 May | Brandon Stadium, Coventry | Bob Valentine | Nigel Boocock | Gordon Kennett |
| 11 May | Hyde Road, Manchester | Chris Pusey | Bob Kilby | Barry Crowson |
| 15 May | Abbey Stadium, Swindon | John Louis | Martin Ashby | Eric Broadbelt |

== Third round ==
=== Norwegian qualifying ===
- 14 October 1973
- (Norway) Geiteryggen Speedwaybane, Skien
- Top 8 to Nordic final 1974

| Pos. | Rider | Points |
|---|---|---|
| 1 | Dag Lovaas | 14 |
| 2 | Edgar Stangeland | 12 |
| 3 | Kjell Gimre | 12 |
| 4 | Oyvind S. Berg | 11 |
| 5 | Ulf Lovaas | 10 |
| 6 | Odd Fossengen | 10 |
| 7 | Jan Terje Gravningen | 10 |
| 8 | Svein Loken | 10 |
| 9 | Nils Otto Haraldsen | 8 |
| 10 | Helge Langli | 8 |
| 11 | Jon Odegaard | 5 |
| 12 | Dagfinn Dahl | 4 |
| 13 | Hans Erik Fuglerud | 3 |
| 14 | Per Hetland | 2 |
| 15 | Stein Roar Pedersen | 1 |
| 16 | Regnar Olaisen | 1 |

=== Finnish qualifying ===
- (Finland) Turku Hippodrome, Turku)
- First (+2 seeded riders) to Nordic final 1975

| Pos. | Rider | Points |
|---|---|---|
| 1 | Matti Olin | 15 |
| 2 | Ilkka Teromaa | 14 |
| 3 | Reino Santala | 12 |
| 4 | Kari Vuoristo | 11 |
| 5 | Rauli Mäkinen | 11 |
| 6 | Pekka Paljakka | 9 |
| 7 | Markku Helminen | 9 |
| 8 | Ari Hiljanen | 8 |
| 9 | Timo Naskali | 7 |
| 10 | Esko Myllari | 5 |
| 11 | Pekka Kortelainen | 4 |
| 12 | Jouko Naskali | 3 |
| 13 | Jukka Ahonen | 2 |
| 14 | Jukka Hautamäki | 2 |
| 15 | Harry Paranko | 1 |
| 16 | Veli-Pekka Teromaa | 12 (disq) |

=== Danish final ===
- Top 4 to Nordic final

=== Continental quarter-finals ===
- Top 32 riders to Continental semi-finals

| Date | Venue | Winner | 2nd | 3rd |
|---|---|---|---|---|
| 18 May | (Czechoslovakia) Markéta Stadium, Prague | (Soviet Union) Mikhail Krasnov | (Soviet Union) Viktor Trofimov | (Soviet Union) Vladimir Zapleshny |
| 19 May | (Socialist Federal Republic of Yugoslavia) Ilirija Sports Park, Ljubljana | (Poland) Zenon Plech | (Poland) Edward Jancarz | (Netherlands) Henny Kroeze |
| 19 May | (West Germany) Breitenthal Stadium, Krumbach | (Poland) Henryk Glücklich | (Poland) Jerzy Szczakiel | (West Germany) Manfred Poschenreider |
| 19 May | (Hungary) Hajdú Volán Stadion, Debrecen | (Soviet Union) Grigory Khlinovsky | (Poland) Andrzej Jurczyński | (Poland) Marek Cieślak |

=== British/Commonwealth semi-finals ===
- 21 May
- (England) Leicester Stadium, Leicester
- Top 8 to British/Commonwealth final

| Pos. | Rider | Points |
|---|---|---|
| 1 | (England) John Louis | 14 |
| 2 | (England) Peter Collins | 13 |
| 3 | (England) Reg Wilson | 12 |
| 4 | (Australia) Bob Valentine | 10 |
| 5 | (New Zealand) Barry Briggs | 9 |
| 6 | (England) Martin Ashby | 9 |
| 7 | (New Zealand) Ivan Mauger | 9 |
| 8 | (Australia) Billy Sanders | 9 |
| 9 | (England) Doug Wyer | 7 |
| 10 | (England) Chris Pusey | 6 |
| 11 | (Australia) Phil Herne | 5 |
| 12 | (England) Barry Crowson | 4 |
| 13 | (Scotland) George Hunter | 4 |
| 14 | (England) Bob Kilby | 3 |
| 15 | (England) Eric Broadbelt | 3 |
| 16 | (England) Arnie Haley | 2 |

- 30 May
- (England) Owlerton Stadium, Sheffield
- Top 8 to British/Commonwealth final

| Pos. | Rider | Points |
|---|---|---|
| 1 | (England) Dave Jessup | 15 |
| 2 | (England) Ray Wilson | 13 |
| 3 | (Scotland) Jim McMillan | 12 |
| 4 | (England) Malcolm Simmons | 11 |
| 5 | (Australia) John Boulger | 10 |
| 6 | (England) Terry Betts | 10 |
| 7 | (England) Eric Boocock | 8 |
| 8 | (Scotland) Bobby Beaton | 8 |
| 9 | (England) Barry Thomas | 8 |
| 10 | (England) Nigel Boocock | 8 |
| 11 | (England) Rick France | 6 |
| 12 | (England) Kevin Holden | 4 |
| 13 | (England) Tony Davey | 3 |
| 14 | (Australia) Phil Crump | 3 |
| 15 | (New Zealand) Bruce Cribb | 1 |
| 16 | (England) Gordon Kennett | 0 |

== Fourth round ==
=== Continental semi-finals ===
- 2 June
- (Poland) Olympic Stadium, Wrocław
- Top 8 to Continental final

| Pos. | Rider | Points |
|---|---|---|
| 1 | (Poland) Edward Jancarz | 14 |
| 2 | (Soviet Union) Vladimir Gordeev | 14 |
| 3 | (Soviet Union) Michail Krasnov | 13 |
| 4 | (Poland) Zbigniew Filipiak | 11 |
| 5 | (Poland) Jan Mucha | 9 |
| 6 | (Poland) Ryszard Fabiszewski | 9 |
| 7 | (Poland) Zenon Plech | 9 |
| 8 | (Soviet Union) Vladimir Zaplechny | 8 |
| 9 | (Soviet Union) Viktor Trofimov | 6 |
| 10 | (Czechoslovakia) Miloslav Špinka | 6 |
| 11 | (Czechoslovakia) Jiří Štancl | 5 |
| 12 | (Poland) Paweł Waloszek | 4 |
| 13 | (Czechoslovakia) Jan Hadek | 4 |
| 14 | (Soviet Union) Vladimir Nesterov | 3 |
| 15 | (Netherlands) Henny Kroeze | 3 |
| 16 | (Poland) Boguslaw Nowak | 2 |

- 2 June
- (West Germany) Motodrom Halbemond, Norden
- Top 8 to Continental final

| Pos. | Rider | Points |
|---|---|---|
| 1 | (Poland) Henryk Glücklich | 12 |
| 2 | (Soviet Union) Michail Starostin | 12 |
| 3 | (Poland) Marek Cieślak | 11 |
| 4 | (Soviet Union) Valerij Gordeev | 10 |
| 5 | (Soviet Union) Grigory Khlinovsky | 10 |
| 6 | (Soviet Union) Anatolij Kuzmin | 10 |
| 7 | (Poland) Bernard Jąder | 9 |
| 8 | (Soviet Union) Alexander Pavlov | 9 |
| 9 | (Poland) Andrzej Jurczyński | 8 |
| 10 | (Poland) Zdzisław Dobrucki | 7 |
| 11 | (West Germany) Manfred Poschenreider | 6 |
| 12 | (Czechoslovakia) Václav Verner | 6 |
| 13 | (West Germany) Josef Angermüller | 4 |
| 14 | (Hungary) Pal Perenyi | 4 |
| 15 | (Hungary) Sándor Domokos | 2 |
| 16 | (Poland) Jerzy Szczakiel | 0 |
| 17 | (West Germany) Rudolf Weindl | 0 |
| 18 | (West Germany) Kazimierz Bentke | 0 |

=== British/Commonwealth Final ===
- 12 June 1974
- (England) Brandon Stadium, Coventry
- First 10 to British-Nordic Final plus 1 reserve

| Placing | Rider | Total | 1 | 2 | 3 | 4 | 5 | 6 | 7 | 8 | 9 | 10 | 11 | 12 | 13 | 14 | 15 | 16 | 17 | 18 | 19 | 20 | Pts | Pos | 21 |
|---|---|---|---|---|---|---|---|---|---|---|---|---|---|---|---|---|---|---|---|---|---|---|---|---|---|
| 1 | (England) (14) Eric Boocock | 13 | | | | 3 | | 3 | | | | | 2 | | 2 | | | | | | | 3 | 13 | 1 | |
| 2 | (England) (11) Terry Betts | 12 | | | 3 | | | | 3 | | 2 | | | | | 2 | | | | | | 2 | 12 | 2 | |
| 3 | (England) (8) Dave Jessup | 11 | | 3 | | | | | | 1 | | | 3 | | | 1 | | | 3 | | | | 11 | 3 | |
| 4 | (Australia) (5) John Boulger | 10 | | 2 | | | 3 | | | | | 3 | | | | | 2 | | | | | 0 | 10 | 4 | |
| 5 | (New Zealand) (13) Ivan Mauger | 9 | | | | 2 | E | | | | | | | 3 | | 3 | | | | | 1 | | 9 | 5 | |
| 6 | (England) (1) Nigel Boocock | 8 | 2 | | | | 2 | | | | 0 | | | | 3 | | | | 1 | | | | 8 | 6 | |
| 7 | (Scotland) (7) Jim McMillan | 8 | | 1 | | | | | 2 | | | | | 1 | 1 | | | | | 3 | | | 8 | 7 | |
| 8 | (England) (12) Peter Collins | 8 | | | 0 | | | | | 3 | | 2 | | | 0 | | | | | | 3 | | 8 | 8 | |
| 9 | (England) (16) John Louis | 8 | | | | 0 | | | | 0 | 3 | | | | | | 3 | | | 2 | | | 8 | 9 | |
| 10 | (England) (4) Ray Wilson | 7 | 1 | | | | | | | 2 | | | | T | | | | 3 | | | | 1 | 7 | 10 | |
| 11 | (New Zealand) (6) Barry Briggs | 6 | | 0 | | | | 1 | | | 1 | | | | | | | 2 | | | 2 | | 6 | 11 | |
| 12 | (Australia) (10) Billy Sanders | 5 | | | 1 | | | 2 | | | | | | 1 | | | 1 | | 0 | | | | 5 | 12 | |
| 13 | (England) (15) Malcolm Simmons | 5 | | | | 1 | | | E | | | 1 | | | | | | 1 | 2 | | | | 5 | 13 | |
| 14 | (England) (9) Reg Wilson | 4 | | | 2 | | 1 | | | | | | X | | | | | F | | 1 | | | 4 | 14 | |
| 15 | (Australia) (2) Bob Valentine | 3 | 3 | | | | | X | | | | F | | | | E | | | | - | | | 3 | 15 | |
| 16 | (England) (3) Martin Ashby | 2 | 0 | | | | | | 1 | | | | 1 | | | | 0 | | | | 0 | | 2 | 16 | |
| R1 | (England) (R1) Frank Smith | 0 | | | | | | | | | | | | 0 | | | | | | | | | 0 | R1 | |
| R2 | (England) (R2) Roger Hill | 0 | | | | | | | | | | | | | | | | | | 0 | | | 0 | R2 | |
| Placing | Rider | Total | 1 | 2 | 3 | 4 | 5 | 6 | 7 | 8 | 9 | 10 | 11 | 12 | 13 | 14 | 15 | 16 | 17 | 18 | 19 | 20 | Pts | Pos | 21 |

m - exclusion for exceeding two minute time allowance • t - exclusion for touching the tapes • x - other exclusion • e - retired or mechanical failure • f - fell • ns - non-starter • nc - non-classify

| gate A - inside | gate B | gate C | gate D - outside |

=== Nordic Final ===
- 9 June 1974
- (Finland) Eteläpuisto, Tampere
- First 6 to British-Nordic Final plus 1 reserve

| Pos. | Rider | Heat Scores | Total |
|---|---|---|---|
| 1 | (Denmark) Ole Olsen | 3,3,3,3,3 | 15 |
| 2 | (Norway) Dag Lövaas | 3,3,3,3,2 | 14 |
| 3 | (Finland) Matti Olin | 2,2,2,2,3 | 11 |
| 4 | (Denmark) Bent Nørregaard-Jensen | 3,1,2,2,2 | 10 |
| 5 | (Norway) Reidar Eide | ef,2,3,3,1 | 9 |
| 6 | (Finland) Kari Vuoristo | 0,2,2,2,3 | 9 |
| 7 | (Norway) Øyvind S. Berg | 2,1,3,1,1 | 8 |
| 8 | (Norway) Edgar Stangeland | 2,3,0,1,2 | 8 |
| 9 | (Denmark) Preben Rosenkilde | 1,1,0,3,2 | 7 |
| 10 | (Norway) Jan Terje Gravningen | 1,3,2,0,ef | 6 |
| 11 | (Norway) Ulf Lovaas | 1,ef,-,2,3 | 6 |
| 12 | (Denmark) Kaj Kristensen | 3,0,1,0,1 | 5 |
| 13 | (Finland) Pekka Paljakka | 1,0,1,1,1 | 4 |
| 14 | (Norway) Svein Lokken | 2,1,1,0,0 | 4 |
| 15 | (Norway) Kjell Gimre | 0,2,1,0,0 | 3 |
| 16 | (Denmark) Nils Nilsen | ef,-,-,-,- | 0 |
| R1 | (Finland) Antti Eklund | f,0,0,1,0 | 1 |

== Fifth round ==
=== Swedish qualification ===
- Top 5 in each heat to Swedish final

(1 May, Gamla Galgberget Visby)
| Pos | Rider | Points |
|---|---|---|
| 1 | Christer Löfqvist | 15 |
| 2 | Bengt Jansson | 12 |
| 3 | Tomas Pettersson | 12 |
| 4 | Sven Nilsson | 11 |
| 5 | Hasse Holmqvist | 11 |
| 6 | Tommy Nilsson | 9+3 |
| 7 | Bengt Larsson | 9+2 |
| 8 | Lars-Åke Andersson | 8 |
| 9 | Roy Dantanus | 8 |
| 10 | Jan Johansson | 7 |
| 11 | Sven-Olov Lindh | 4 |
| 12 | Benny Ekberg | 4 |
| 13 | Willy Karlsson | 4 |
| 14 | Rolf Johansson | 2 |
| 15 | Åke Andersson | 2 |
| 16 | Claes-Ingvar Svensson | 1 |
| 17 | Kjell Bergström | 1 |

(1 May, Målilla (Motorbana) Målilla)
| Pos | Rider | Points |
|---|---|---|
| 1 | Tommy Johansson | 15 |
| 2 | Bo Wirebrand | 12 |
| 3 | Christer Sjösten | 11 |
| 4 | Tommy Jansson | 10 |
| 5 | Sören Karlsson | 10 |
| 6 | Käll Haage | 9 |
| 7 | Olle Nygren | 7 |
| 8 | Berndt Johansson | 7 |
| 9 | Leif Johansson | 7 |
| 10 | Richard Hellsén | 6 |
| 11 | Eddie Davidsson | 6 |
| 12 | Tommy Wedén | 6 |
| 13 | Hans Johansson | 6 |
| 14 | Karl-Fredrik Lindgren | 4 |
| 15 | Ragnar Holm | 2 |
| 16 | Kenneth Selmosson | 1 |
| 17 | Stefan Hjort | 1 |

(1 May, Gislaved Motorbana Gislaved)
| Pos | Rider | Points |
|---|---|---|
| 1 | Sören Sjösten | 15 |
| 2 | Bernt Persson | 14 |
| 3 | Therje Henriksson | 12 |
| 4 | Leif Enecrona | 11 |
| 5 | Karl-Erik Claesson | 11 |
| 6 | Stephan Johansson | 10 |
| 7 | Lars Jansson | 9 |
| 8 | Stefan Salmonsson | 8 |
| 9 | Lars Larsson | 6 |
| 10 | Börje Klingberg | 5 |
| 11 | Peter Smith | 5 |
| 12 | Lars-Inge Hultberg | 5 |
| 13 | Conny Samuelsson | 4 |
| 14 | Leif Mellberg | 2 |
| 15 | Åke Dovhed | 2 |
| 16 | Anders Lövgren | 1 |
| 17 | Sven-Erik Andersson | 0 |
| 18 | Håkan Karlsson | 0 |

=== Continental Final ===
- 23 June 1974
- (Soviet Union) Anatoly Stepanov Stadium, Tolyatti
- First 8 to European Final

| Placing | Rider | Total | 1 | 2 | 3 | 4 | 5 | 6 | 7 | 8 | 9 | 10 | 11 | 12 | 13 | 14 | 15 | 16 | 17 | 18 | 19 | 20 | Pts | Pos | 21 |
|---|---|---|---|---|---|---|---|---|---|---|---|---|---|---|---|---|---|---|---|---|---|---|---|---|---|
| 1 | (Soviet Union) (10) Vladimir Gordeev | 12 | | | 3 | | | 3 | | | | | | 1 | | | 3 | | 2 | | | | 12 | 1 | |
| 2 | (Soviet Union) (1) Mikhail Starostin | 11 | 3 | | | | 3 | | | | 0 | | | | 2 | | | | 3 | | | | 11 | 2 | |
| 3 | (Poland) (4) Zenon Plech | 11 | F | | | | | | | 3 | | | | 3 | | | | 3 | | | | 2 | 11 | 3 | |
| 4 | (Soviet Union) (11) Mikhail Krasnov | 10 | | | 2 | | | | 3 | | 2 | | | | | 3 | | | | | | 0 | 10 | 4 | |
| 5 | (Soviet Union) (3) Anatoly Kuzmin | 10 | 2 | | | | | | 2 | | | | 3 | | | | 0 | | | | 3 | | 10 | 5 | |
| 6 | (Poland) (7) Jan Mucha | 9 | | 2 | | | | | 1 | | | | | E | 3 | | | | | 3 | | | 9 | 6 | |
| 7 | (Poland) (13) Edward Jancarz | 9 | | | | 3 | X | | | | | | | 2 | | 2 | | | | | 2 | | 9 | 7 | |
| 8 | (Soviet Union) (14) Grigory Khlinovsky | 8 | | | | 1 | | 1 | | | | | 2 | | 1 | | | | | | | 3 | 8 | 8 | |
| 9 | (Poland) (5) Ryszard Fabiszewski | 8 | | 3 | | | 2 | | | | | 1 | | | | | 1 | | | | | 1 | 8 | 9 | |
| 10 | (Soviet Union) (15) Valery Gordeev | 7 | | | | 2 | | | 0 | | | 3 | | | | | | 2 | E | | | | 7 | 10 | |
| 11 | (Soviet Union) (6) Vladimir Zapleshny | 6 | | 1 | | | | 0 | | | 3 | | | | | | | 1 | | | 1 | | 6 | 11 | |
| 12 | (Poland) (16) Marek Cieślak | 5 | | | | 0 | | | | 1 | 1 | | | | | | 2 | | | 1 | | | 5 | 12 | |
| 13 | (Poland) (8) Henryk Glücklich | 3 | | 0 | | | | | | 2 | | | X | | | 1 | | | X | | | | 3 | 13 | |
| 14 | (Soviet Union) (9) Aleksandr Pavlov | 3 | | | 0 | | 1 | | | | | | 0 | | | | | E | | 2 | | | 3 | 14 | |
| 15 | (Poland) (12) Bernard Jąder | 3 | | | 1 | | | | | 0 | | 2 | | | 0 | | | | | | 0 | | 3 | 15 | |
| 16 | (Poland) (2) Zbigniew Filipiak | 2 | E | | | | | 2 | | | | 0 | | | | 0 | | | | 0 | | | 2 | 16 | |
| R1 | (West Germany) (R1) Josef Angermüller | 0 | | | | | | | | | | | | | | | | | | | | | 0 | R1 | |
| Placing | Rider | Total | 1 | 2 | 3 | 4 | 5 | 6 | 7 | 8 | 9 | 10 | 11 | 12 | 13 | 14 | 15 | 16 | 17 | 18 | 19 | 20 | Pts | Pos | 21 |

m - exclusion for exceeding two minute time allowance • t - exclusion for touching the tapes • x - other exclusion • e - retired or mechanical failure • f - fell • ns - non-starter • nc - non-classify

| gate A - inside | gate B | gate C | gate D - outside |

=== British/Commonwealth/Nordic Final ===
- 4 August 1974
- (Denmark) Speedway Center, Fredericia
- First 8 to European Final

| Placing | Rider | Total | 1 | 2 | 3 | 4 | 5 | 6 | 7 | 8 | 9 | 10 | 11 | 12 | 13 | 14 | 15 | 16 | 17 | 18 | 19 | 20 | Pts | Pos | 21 |
|---|---|---|---|---|---|---|---|---|---|---|---|---|---|---|---|---|---|---|---|---|---|---|---|---|---|
| 1 | (Denmark) (8) Ole Olsen | 14 | | 3 | | | | | | 3 | | | 3 | | | 3 | | | 2 | | | | 14 | 1 | |
| 2 | (New Zealand) (5) Ivan Mauger | 13 | | 2 | | | 2 | | | | | 3 | | | | | 3 | | | | | 3 | 13 | 2 | |
| 3 | (England) (16) John Louis | 10 | | | | 3 | | | | 0 | 3 | | | | | | 2 | | | 2 | | | 10 | 3 | |
| 4 | (England) (2) Terry Betts | 10 | 3 | | | | | 3 | | | | 1 | | | | 2 | | | | 1 | | | 10 | 4 | |
| 5 | (England) (12) Peter Collins | 10 | | | 3 | | | | | 1 | | 2 | | | 3 | | | | | | 1 | | 10 | 5 | |
| 6 | (England) (9) Dave Jessup | 10 | | | 2 | | E | | | | | | 2 | | | | | 3 | | 3 | | | 10 | 6 | |
| 7 | (United States) (4) Scott Autrey | 9 | 2 | | | | | | | 2 | | | | 1 | | | | 2 | | | | 2 | 9 | 7 | |
| 8 | (Norway) (7) Dag Lovaas | 9 | | 1 | | | | | 3 | | | | | 3 | 2 | | | | | E | | | 9 | 8 | |
| 9 | (Australia) (1) John Boulger | 8 | 1 | | | | 3 | | | | 1 | | | | E | | | | 3 | | | | 8 | 9 | |
| 10 | (Scotland) (6) Jim McMillan | 8 | | 0 | | | | 2 | | | 2 | | | | | | | 1 | | | 3 | | 8 | 10 | |
| 11 | (Norway) (13) Reidar Eide | 7 | | | | 1 | 1 | | | | | | | 2 | | 1 | | | | | 2 | | 7 | 11 | |
| 12 | (Denmark) (14) Bent Nørregaard-Jensen | 6 | | | | 2 | | 1 | | | | | 1 | | 1 | | | | | | | 1 | 6 | 12 | |
| 13 | (England) (15) Nigel Boocock | 2 | | | | 0 | | | 1 | | | 0 | | | | | | E | 1 | | | | 2 | 13 | |
| 14 | (Finland) (11) Matti Olin | 1 | | | 1 | | | | 0 | | 0 | | | | | 0 | | | | | | 0 | 1 | 14 | |
| 15 | (England) (3) Eric Boocock | 0 | F | | | | | | - | | | | - | | | | - | | | | - | | 0 | 15 | |
| 16 | (Finland) (10) Kari Vuoristo | 0 | | | 0 | | | 0 | | | | | | 0 | | | 0 | | - | | | | 0 | 16 | |
| R1 | (England) (R1) Ray Wilson | 3 | | | | | | | 2 | | | | | | | | 1 | | | | | | 3 | R1 | |
| R2 | (Norway) (R2) Øyvind S. Berg | 0 | | | | | | | | | | | 0 | | | | | | | | 0 | | 0 | R2 | |
| Placing | Rider | Total | 1 | 2 | 3 | 4 | 5 | 6 | 7 | 8 | 9 | 10 | 11 | 12 | 13 | 14 | 15 | 16 | 17 | 18 | 19 | 20 | Pts | Pos | 21 |

m - exclusion for exceeding two minute time allowance • t - exclusion for touching the tapes • x - other exclusion • e - retired or mechanical failure • f - fell • ns - non-starter • nc - non-classify

| gate A - inside | gate B | gate C | gate D - outside |

== Sixth round ==
=== Swedish Finals ===
- Top 5 from 3 meetings progress to World final
- R1 (28 May, Gubbängens IP, Stockholm)
- R2 (29 May, Norrköping Motorstadion, Norrköping)
- R3 (30 May, Ullevi, Gothenburg)

| Pos. | Rider | R1 | R2 | R3 | Total |
|---|---|---|---|---|---|
| 1 | Anders Michanek | 12 | 15 | 15 | 42 |
| 2 | Sören Sjösten | 15 | 14 | 12 | 41 |
| 3 | Christer Löfqvist | 12 | 12 | 11 | 35 |
| 4 | Bengt Jansson | 11 | 8 | 14 | 33 |
| 5 | Tommy Johansson | 11 | 12 | 10 | 33 |
| 6 | Tommy Jansson | 10 | 9 | 13 | 32 |
| 7 | Sören Karlsson | 5 | 11 | 7 | 23 |
| 8 | Hasse Holmqvist | 8 | 9 | 6 | 23 |
| 9 | Tommy Pettersson | 7 | 9 | 6 | 22 |
| 10 | Bernt Persson | 9 | 5 | 6 | 20 |

| Pos. | Rider | R1 | R2 | R3 | Total |
|---|---|---|---|---|---|
| 11 | Bo Wirebrand | 7 | 4 | 5 | 15 |
| 12 | Christer Sjösten | 4 | 5 | 5 | 14 |
| 13 | Karl-Erik Claesson | 1 | 2 | 5 | 8 |
| 14 | Sven Nilsson | 4 | 2 | 2 | 8 |
| 15 | Stephan Johansson | 1 | 2 | 2 | 5 |
| 16 | Tommy Nilsson | 3 | 2 | - | 5 |
| 17 | Käll Haage | - | - | 2 | 1 |
| 18 | Therje Henriksson | 0 | 0 | 0 | 0 |
| 19 | Leif Enecrona | 0 | - | - | 0 |

=== European Final ===
- Top 11 to World final
- 31 August 1974
- (England) Wembley Stadium, London

| Placing | Rider | Total | 1 | 2 | 3 | 4 | 5 | 6 | 7 | 8 | 9 | 10 | 11 | 12 | 13 | 14 | 15 | 16 | 17 | 18 | 19 | 20 | Pts | Pos | 21 |
|---|---|---|---|---|---|---|---|---|---|---|---|---|---|---|---|---|---|---|---|---|---|---|---|---|---|
| 1 | (England) (15) Peter Collins | 13 | | | | 3 | | | 2 | | | 3 | | | | | | 3 | 2 | | | | 13 | 1 | 3 |
| 2 | (Denmark) (2) Ole Olsen | 13 | 3 | | | | | 3 | | | | 2 | | | | 3 | | | | 2 | | | 13 | 2 | 2 |
| 3 | (New Zealand) (4) Ivan Mauger | 13 | 2 | | | | | | | 3 | | | | 3 | | | | 2 | | | | 3 | 13 | 3 | 1 |
| 4 | (Soviet Union) (8) Vladimir Gordeev | 11 | | 2 | | | | | | 2 | | | 3 | | | 1 | | | 3 | | | | 11 | 4 | |
| 5 | (England) (12) John Louis | 10 | | | 3 | | | | | 0 | | 1 | | | 3 | | | | | | 3 | | 10 | 5 | |
| 6 | (Poland) (14) Zenon Plech | 10 | | | | 2 | | 2 | | | | | 2 | | 2 | | | | | | | 2 | 10 | 6 | |
| 7 | (England) (11) Dave Jessup | 8 | | | E | | | | 3 | | 3 | | | | | 2 | | | | | | 0 | 8 | 7 | |
| 8 | (Norway) (7) Dag Lovaas | 7 | | 3 | | | | | 1 | | | | | 0 | E | | | | | 3 | | | 7 | 8 | |
| 9 | (Soviet Union) (16) Grigory Khlinovsky | 7 | | | | F | | | | 1 | 2 | | | | | | 3 | | | 1 | | | 7 | 9 | |
| 10 | (England) (5) Terry Betts | 6 | | 0 | | | 3 | | | | | 0 | | | | | 2 | | | | | 1 | 6 | 10 | |
| 11 | (Soviet Union) (13) Mikhail Krasnov | 6 | | | | 1 | 1 | | | | | | | 2 | | 0 | | | | | 2 | | 6 | 11 | |
| 12 | (Poland) (10) Edward Jancarz | 5 | | | 2 | | | 1 | | | | | | 1 | | | 1 | | 0 | | | | 5 | 12 | |
| 13 | (United States) (6) Scott Autrey | 3 | | 1 | | | | 0 | | | 1 | | | | | | | 0 | | | 1 | | 3 | 13 | |
| 14 | (Soviet Union) (9) Mikhail Starostin | 2 | | | 1 | | 0 | | | | | | 0 | | | | | 1 | | 0 | | | 2 | 14 | |
| 15 | (Soviet Union) (3) Anatoly Kuzmin | 1 | 0 | | | | | | 0 | | | | 1 | | | | 0 | | | | 0 | | 1 | 15 | |
| 16 | (Poland) (1) Jan Mucha | 0 | - | | | | - | | | | - | | | | - | | | | - | | | | 0 | 16 | |
| R1 | (Scotland) (R1) Jim McMillan | 2 | 1 | | | | | | | | 0 | | | | | | | | 1 | | | | 2 | R1 | |
| R2 | (Australia) (R2) John Boulger | 3 | | | | | 2 | | | | | | | | 1 | | | | | | | | 3 | R2 | |
| Placing | Rider | Total | 1 | 2 | 3 | 4 | 5 | 6 | 7 | 8 | 9 | 10 | 11 | 12 | 13 | 14 | 15 | 16 | 17 | 18 | 19 | 20 | Pts | Pos | 21 |

m - exclusion for exceeding two minute time allowance • t - exclusion for touching the tapes • x - other exclusion • e - retired or mechanical failure • f - fell • ns - non-starter • nc - non-classify

| gate A - inside | gate B | gate C | gate D - outside |

== World Final ==
- 6 September 1974
- (Sweden) Ullevi, Gothenburg.

| Placing | Rider | Total | 1 | 2 | 3 | 4 | 5 | 6 | 7 | 8 | 9 | 10 | 11 | 12 | 13 | 14 | 15 | 16 | 17 | 18 | 19 | 20 | Pts | Pos | 21 |
|---|---|---|---|---|---|---|---|---|---|---|---|---|---|---|---|---|---|---|---|---|---|---|---|---|---|
| 1 | (Sweden) (10) Anders Michanek | 15 | | | 3 | | | 3 | | | | | | 3 | | | 3 | | 3 | | | | 15 | 1 | |
| 2 | (New Zealand) (1) Ivan Mauger | 11 | 2 | | | | 2 | | | | 3 | | | | 2 | | | | 2 | | | | 11 | 2 | 3 |
| 3 | (Sweden) (13) Sören Sjösten | 11 | | | | 3 | 3 | | | | | | | 1 | | 1 | | | | | 3 | | 11 | 3 | 2 |
| 4 | (United Kingdom) (16) John Louis | 9 | | | | 1 | | | | 3 | 0 | | | | | | 2 | | | 3 | | | 9 | 4 | |
| 5 | (Sweden) (8) Bengt Jansson | 9 | | 2 | | | | | | 1 | | | 3 | | | 3 | | | R | | | | 9 | 5 | |
| 6 | (United Kingdom) (15) Peter Collins | 9 | | | | 2 | | | 2 | | | 2 | | | | | | 2 | 1 | | | | 9 | 6 | |
| 7 | (Sweden) (7) Tommy Johansson | 8 | | 3 | | | | | 0 | | | | | 0 | 3 | | | | | 2 | | | 8 | 7 | |
| 8 | (Poland) (11) Zenon Plech | 8 | | | 0 | | | | 3 | | 1 | | | | | 2 | | | | | | 2 | 8 | 8 | |
| 9 | (Sweden) (4) Christer Löfqvist | 8 | 3 | | | | | | | 2 | | | | 2 | | | | 1 | | | | R | 8 | 9 | |
| 10 | (Soviet Union) (6) Grigory Khlinovsky | 6 | | 1 | | | | 0 | | | 2 | | | | | | | 3 | | | F | | 6 | 10 | |
| 11 | (Norway) (12) Dag Lövaas | 6 | | | 1 | | | | | 0 | | 3 | | | 1 | | | | | | 1 | | 6 | 11 | |
| 12 | (United Kingdom) (5) Terry Betts | 6 | | 0 | | | 1 | | | | | 1 | | | | | 1 | | | | | 3 | 6 | 12 | |
| 13 | (United Kingdom) (14) Dave Jessup | 5 | | | | 0 | | 2 | | | | | 2 | | 0 | | | | | | | 1 | 5 | 13 | |
| 14 | (Soviet Union) (2) Mikhail Krasnov | 3 | 1 | | | | | 1 | | | | R | | | | 0 | | | | 1 | | | 3 | 14 | |
| 15 | (Denmark) (9) Ole Olsen | 2 | | | 2 | | F | | | | | | - | | | | | - | | - | | | 2 | 15 | |
| 16 | (Soviet Union) (3) Vladimir Gordeev | 0 | 0 | | | | | | F | | | | - | | | | - | | | | - | | 0 | 16 | |
| R1 | (Sweden) (R1) Tommy Jansson | 3 | | | | | | | 1 | | | | 0 | | | | 0 | | | | 2 | | 3 | R1 | |
| R2 | (Poland) (R2) Edward Jancarz | 1 | | | | | | | | | | | 1 | | | | | 0 | | 0 | | | 1 | R2 | |
| Placing | Rider | Total | 1 | 2 | 3 | 4 | 5 | 6 | 7 | 8 | 9 | 10 | 11 | 12 | 13 | 14 | 15 | 16 | 17 | 18 | 19 | 20 | Pts | Pos | 21 |

m - exclusion for exceeding two minute time allowance • t - exclusion for touching the tapes • x - other exclusion • e - retired or mechanical failure • f - fell • ns - non-starter • nc - non-classify

| gate A - inside | gate B | gate C | gate D - outside |
