= William Broadbent (disambiguation) =

William Broadbent may refer to:

- William Broadbent (1825–1907), English neurologist
- William Broadbent (minister) (1755–1827), English Unitarian minister
- William Broadbent, 3rd Baronet (1904–1987), of the Broadbent baronets

== See also ==
- William Broadbent Luddington (1843–1888), English Primitive Methodist missionary
- Broadbent
