= Broadbelt =

Broadbelt is a surname. Notable people with the surname include:

- Eric Broadbelt (born 1947), British speedway rider
- Linda Broadbelt, American chemical engineer
- Richie Broadbelt (born 1938), Canadian ice hockey goaltender

== See also ==
- Broadbent, surname
