= John Broadbent (disambiguation) =

John Broadbent (1872–1938) was a British Army officer and Conservative politician.

John Broadbent may also refer to:

- John Raymond Broadbent (Quartermaster-General) (1893–1972), Australian Army officer, Quartermaster-General
- John Raymond Broadbent (Major General) (1914–2006), Australian Army officer, C.O. 17/18 Bt.
- Sir John Broadbent, 2nd Baronet (1865–1946), English physician
- Ed Broadbent (John Edward Broadbent, 1936–2024), Canadian politician and political scientist

== See also ==
- Broadbent
