= Thomas Broadbent =

Thomas Broadbent may refer to:

- Thomas Harold Broadbent Maufe (1898–1942), English recipient of the Victoria Cross
- Thomas Biggin Broadbent (1793–1817), English preacher
- Tom Broadbent (Australian footballer) (born 1936), Australian rules footballer for Fitzroy
- Tom Broadbent (English footballer) (born 1992), association football player
