= Jerzy Szczakiel =

Polish speedway rider (1949–2020)

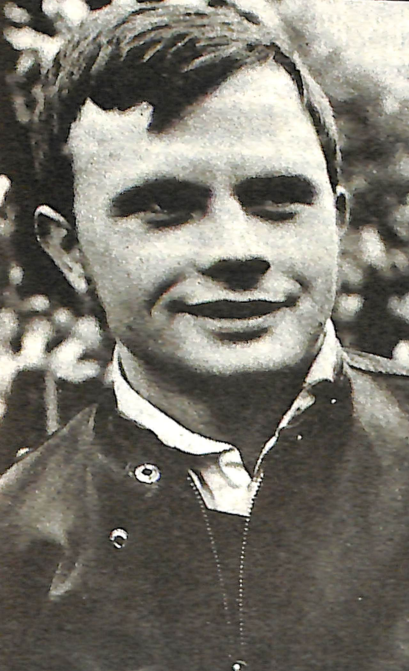
- Born: 28 January 1949; Grudzice, Poland
- Died: 1 September 2020 (aged 71); Opole, Poland
- Nationality: Polish

Career history
- 1967–1979: Opole

Individual honours
- 1973: World Champion
- 1969: Poland Silver Helmet Winner

Team honours
- 1971: World Pairs Champion

Jerzy Szczakiel (28 January 1949 – 1 September 2020) was a Polish speedway rider. He was one of three Polish nationals to have won the Speedway World Championship, the others being 2010 World champion Tomasz Gollob and the 2019 Speedway Grand Prix winner and 2019 World Champion, Bartosz Zmarzlik.

== Career ==
Szczakiel first appeared in a World Final in 1970 at the Olympic Stadium in Wrocław, Poland where he was a reserve for the Final but did not ride on the day. He rode in the World Final in 1971 at the Ullevi Stadium in Gothenburg, Sweden, where he failed to score in his five rides. Szczakiel's next (and last) World Final was in 1973 at the Silesian Stadium in Chorzów, Poland. In front of the largest crowd in world speedway history (estimated to be around 130,000), he scored 13 points, winning his first three rides and finishing second in his last two. He won the title after a run-off with the defending champion Ivan Mauger of New Zealand after both riders tied on 13 points. Mauger fell in the run-off, leaving Szczakiel to finish unchallenged and win the championship. Fellow countryman Zenon Plech finished third. Before the meeting, Szczakiel was considered a rank outsider to win the championship with all eyes on Mauger, 1971 champion Ole Olsen, Plech and Swede Anders Michanek.

In an amazing turn around of form, just two weeks after winning the World Championship, Szczakiel represented Poland in the final of the 1973 Speedway World Team Cup at the Wembley Stadium in London, where he could not come to grips with the notoriously difficult Wembley track and failed to score a point from his four rides. He finished a distant last in his first race, retired with engine failure in his next two (both times while running last), and was excluded from his last race for breaking the tapes at the start. The Poles finished in last place in the Final behind winners Great Britain, runners-up Sweden, and the third placed USSR. Four time World Champion Barry Briggs from New Zealand reported during commentary for ITV of the WTC Final that Szczakiel had a major crash in practice three days earlier when he went over his bikes handlebars in turn one and lacerated his leg, severing a blood vessel. Briggs also helped secure a pair of bikes for the Final as Szczakiel's crashed bike was the only one he had available. Briggs and fellow ITV commentator Dave Lanning surmised that the Pole's confidence was shot following his practice crash which accounted for his poor showing at Wembley, though Lanning was far more scathing of the reigning World Champion.

In defence of his World title, Szczakiel was seeded straight to the Continental Semi-final at the Motodrom Halbemond in Norden, West Germany. There, he finished 16th and last having failed to score a point and thus failing to qualify for both the Continental Final in Togliatti, Italy, as well as the 1974 World Final in Gothenburg.

Szczakiel was also winner of the World Pairs Championship with Andrzej Wyglenda in 1971. He scored 15 points in the final, held at the Rybnik Municipal Stadium in Rybnik, Poland.

As a measure of Szczakeil's skill as a rider, between 1971 and 1973 he raced Ivan Mauger 13 times - and won 6, including beating him twice in the 1973 World Final.

At home in Poland, Szczakiel rode for first division team Kolejarz Opole in the Pierwsza Liga in 1970's. He continued to ride for Opole until his forced retirement from a back injury in 1980. He stayed involved with the team as Manager until 1986 and became an honorary member of the club.

== Restrictions ==
During his career, while other Polish riders such as Zenon Plech and Edward Jancarz were seemingly free to travel the world representing Poland in speedway, Polish authorities would not allow the 1973 World Champion to race anywhere but in Europe and only on rare occasions did he compete in Britain. Following his 1973 World title win, Szczakiel was invited by fellow World Champions Ivan Mauger and Barry Briggs to join their troupe (Ole Olsen, Scott Autrey, Chris Pusey and Bert Harkins) on a world tour to the USA, Australia and their native New Zealand. Polish authorities had other ideas however and vetoed his participation (but allowed both Plech and Jancarz to go on the tour).

After his retirement, when asked about not being allowed to compete outside of Europe, Szczakiel said:

I was prevented from racing league speedway in England. I could race in Europe, but wasn't allowed to stay in England and live there. But I'm not complaining, I saw Western Europe, met some fantastic people and made good friends. I really enjoyed that time and if I could turn the clock back, I would not change a thing.

== Personal life ==
Szczakiel was married and had three children. In later life, he worked as a shoe importer.

== World Final Appearances ==
=== Individual World Championship ===
- 1970 – (Poland) Wrocław, Olympic Stadium - Reserve - Did not ride
- 1971 – (Sweden) Gothenburg, Ullevi - 15th - 0pts
- 1973 – (Poland) Chorzów, Silesian Stadium - winner - 13pts+3pts

=== World Pairs Championship ===
- 1971 – (Poland) Rybnik, Rybnik Municipal Stadium (with Andrzej Wyglenda) - winner - 30pts (15)

=== World Team Cup ===
- 1973 – (England) London, Wembley Stadium (with Pawel Waloszek / Edward Jancarz / Zenon Plech / Jan Mucha) - 4th - 8pts (0)
- 1974 – (Poland) Chorzów, Silesian Stadium (with Zenon Plech / Jan Mucha / Andrzej Jurczyński / Andrzej Tkocz) - 3rd - 13pts (0)
