= Richard May (speedway rider) =

British motorcycle speedway racer (born 1944)

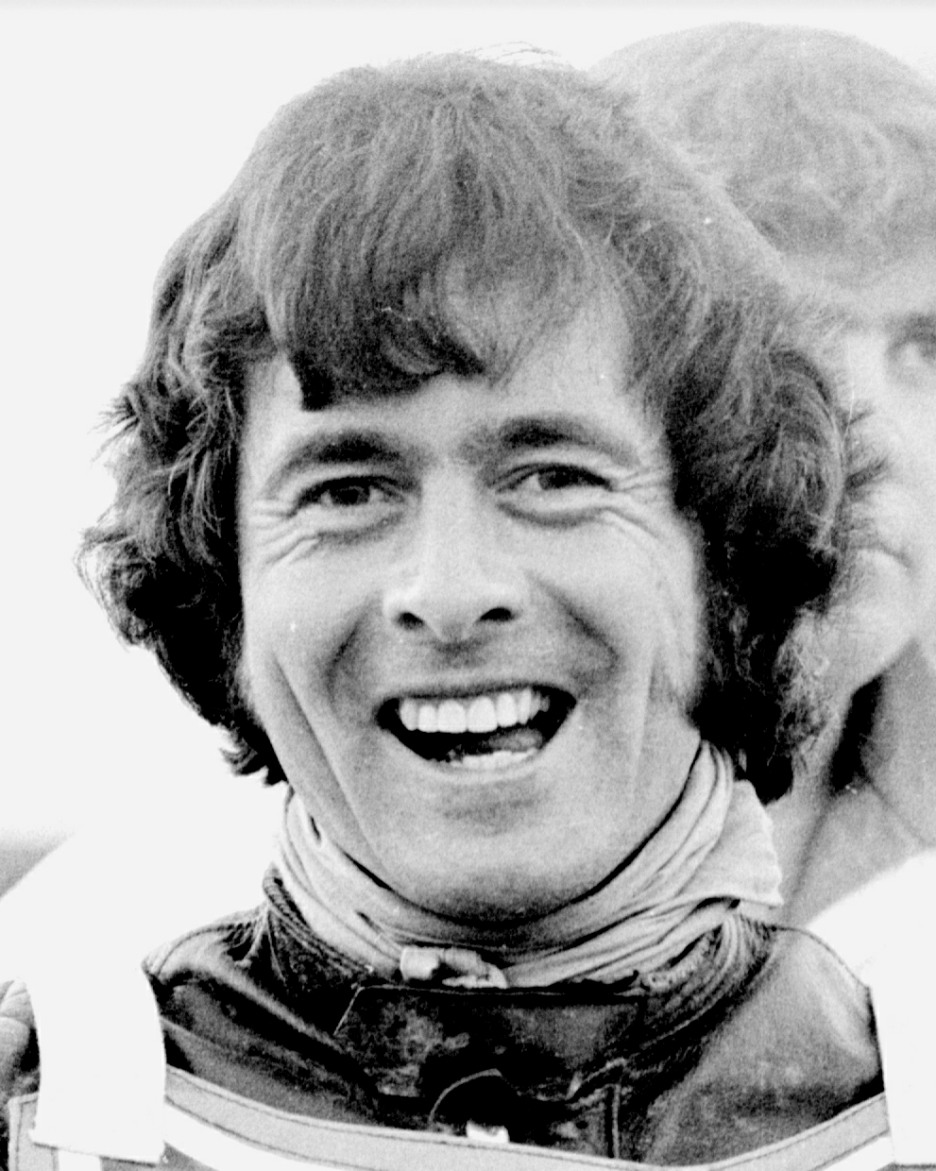
- Richard May, speedway rider.
- Born: 8 May 1944; Southampton, England

Career history
- 1969–1973, 1975: Reading Racers
- 1974, 1976–1977: Poole Pirates

Team honours
- 1973: British League
- 1972: Spring Gold Cup

Charles Richard May (born 8 May 1944 in Southampton, England) was a motorcycle speedway rider that rode for Reading Racers and Poole Pirates between 1969 and 1977.

== Career ==
"Dickie" May was the Southern Centre 350cc Solo Grasstrack champion in 1967. In 1970 he was part of the Young England side that faced a Young Sweden side in the Division 2 Test Series tour In 1971 he won the Golden Helmet from Ken McKinlay.

May joined Reading Racers in 1969 and spent five seasons with them, culminating in winning the 1973 British League, along with regular riders Anders Michanek, Dag Lövaas, Geoff Curtis, Mick Bell and Bernie Leigh. He also rode for Poole Pirates. While riding for the Pirates, he competed in the preliminary round of the British Qualifiers of the 1974 Individual Speedway World Championship and was the leading bonus point scorer that year for Poole.

Speedway writer Arnie Gibbons (author of Tears and Glory ISBN 9780955845505) wrote in the Speedway Plus article "We had Joy, We Had Fun" that after a meet on 5 October 1970, May had become his first speedway hero after scoring a 12 point full maximum which helped the Reading Racers beat Eastbourne.
