= Mikhail Krasnov =

Soviet speedway rider

- Born: Soviet Union
- Died: November 1979
- Nationality: Russian

Career history

Balakovo

Individual honours
- 1974: Speedway World Championship finalist

Mikhail Krasnov (died November 1979) was an international speedway rider from the Soviet Union.

== Speedway career ==
Krasnov was a leading Soviet Union international during the early 1970s reaching the final of the Speedway World Championship in the 1974 Individual Speedway World Championship. He was also part of the Soviet Union team that reached the World Cup Final.

Krasnov died in November 1979.

== World final appearance s ==
=== Individual World Championship ===
- 1974 – (Sweden) Gothenburg, Ullevi – 14th – 3pts

=== World Team Cup ===
- 1974 - (Poland) Chorzów, Stadion Śląski, Chorzów (with Valery Gordeev / Viktor Kalmykov / Anatoly Kuzmin) - 4th - 10pts
