= Broadbent sign =

- Differential diagnosis: Adhesive pericarditis

Broadbent sign is a clinical sign in which the 11th and 12th ribs are indrawn during systolic phase of a heartbeat, with narrowing of the intercostal space posteriorly, which is seen in case adhesive pericarditis due to pericardial adhesions to the diaphragm.

During diseased status of adhesive pericarditis, the pericardium of the heart may adhere not only to the central tendon of diaphragm, but also to a large area of muscular portion of diaphragm as well as anterior chest wall. Thus when the heart contracts, the adhesion portion may be dragged inward and downward (if the main contraction force is toward central tendon of diaphragm). Besides, absent palpable apical impulse can also be detected in the case of adhesive pericarditis.

The sign is named after Walter Broadbent, and was published in his first paper in 1895, although it may have been inspired by his father, Sir William Broadbent.
