= Jane Broadbent =

Pro-vice-chancellor and provost at the University of Roehampton (born 1952)

Jane Broadbent (born 3 March 1952) is the pro-vice-chancellor and provost at the University of Roehampton.

== Biography ==
Broadbent was born on 3 March 1952 in Barnsley, England. Prior to her appointment at Roehampton University, Broadbent held the position of Senior Vice-Principal (Academic Affairs) at Royal Holloway, University of London.

Her published academic work includes more than 60 refereed publications and has focussed on performance management, with particular reference to the UK public sector and the Private Finance Initiative (PFI). Her work has been funded by the Chartered Institute of Management Accountants and the Australian Research Council.

She is editor of the journal Public Money and Management and holds the following positions:

- Vice-Chair, Research Board of Association of Chartered Certified Accountants
- Associate editor, Accounting, Auditing & Accountability Journal
- Associate editor, British Accounting Review
- Associate editor, Journal of Accounting & Organisational Change
- Editorial Board Member, Critical Perspectives on Accounting
