= Broadbent inverted sign =

- Specialty: Cardiology
- Diagnostic method: Left ventricular hypertrophy

The Broadbent inverted sign is a clinical sign in which pulsation is seen on the postero-lateral wall of the left side of the chest in time with cardiac systole. This was originally thought to be due to an aneurysm of the left atrium, but is now known to be more commonly associated with left ventricular hypertrophy. The sign is named after Sir William Broadbent.
