= Walter Broadbent =

Walter Broadbent FRCP (4 August 1868 – 17 October 1951) was an English physician remembered for describing the Broadbent sign of constrictive pericarditis.

== Biography ==
Walter Broadbent was born in London in 1868, the son of Sir William Broadbent. He was educated at Harrow School, Trinity College, Cambridge and St Mary's Hospital, London. He graduated in 1893. His first paper, published in 1895, described the Broadbent sign.

He was consulting physician to the Royal Sussex County Hospital, to the Royal Alexandra Hospital for Children, and to the Lady Chichester Hospital for Nervous Diseases at Hove.

In 1896, he married Edith, daughter of John Monroe, justice of the High Court of Justice in Ireland. They had two sons and two daughters. His grandson, George Walter Broadbent, inherited the Broadbent baronetcy as the 4th Baronet.

Broadbent died at Henfield, Sussex, at age 83.
