= Jeffrey Broadbent =

American sociologist

Jeffrey Praed Broadbent (born in 1944) is an emeritus professor in the Department of Sociology at the University of Minnesota whose academic focus includes comparative sociology; environmental sociology; Japanese society; political networks; political sociology and social movements. He is also a member of the Institute for Global Studies at the University of Minnesota.

== Education ==
Broadbent received a B.A. (1974) in religious studies-Buddhism at the University of California, Berkeley, an M.A. (1975) in Regional Studies—Japan at Harvard University, and a Ph.D. (1982) in sociology at Harvard University.

== Academic career ==
From 1988 to 1989, Broadbent was a grantee of the Japan-United States Educational Commission (a Fulbright Program), and was a Fulbright-Hays scholar from 1989 to 1990. He received the Social Science Research Council's Abe Fellowship for 2005–6. Broadbent was awarded two academic prizes for his book, Environmental Politics in Japan: Networks of Power and Protest, the best book award from the Section on Environmental Sociology of the American Sociological Association (2000) and the Masayoshi Ōhira Memorial Prize in Japan (2001) The book received positive reviews.

== Selected publications ==
- Broadbent, J. (2024). “Power and Theory: Toward a Multidimensional Explanation of the Dynamic Political Field.” Journal of Political Power (17) 3.
- Broadbent, J.; Brockman, V. (2011). East Asian Social Movements. New York: Springer.
- Broadbent, J. (1998). Environmental Politics in Japan: Networks of Power and Protest. Cambridge: Cambridge University Press. ISBN 0521665744
- Knoke, David; Franz Pappi; Jeffrey Broadbent, Yutaka Tsujinaka (1996). Comparing Policy Networks: Labor Politics in the U.S., Germany, and Japan. Cambridge: Cambridge University Press. ISBN 0521499275
