= Vladimir Zapleshny =

Soviet speedway rider

- Born: Soviet Union
- Nationality: Russian

Career history

Soviet Union
- 1968–1975: Vladivostok

Individual honours
- 1973: Speedway World Championship finalist
- 1972: Soviet championship silver

Vladimir Zapleshny is a former international speedway rider from the Soviet Union.

== Speedway career ==
Zapleshny reached the final of the Speedway World Championship in the 1973 Individual Speedway World Championship. He was one of four Russians that competed in the 1973 World final after strong performances in the Continental final and European final. During the 1973 Continental final, he took the bronze medal and remarkably was one of the seven Russians that took the first seven places.

Zapleshny won the silver medal at the Soviet Union championship in 1972.

== World final appearances ==
=== Individual World Championship ===
- 1973 – (Poland) Chorzów, Silesian Stadium – 15th – 2pts
