= Arthur Broadbent =

English cricketer

Arthur Broadbent (7 June 1879 – 19 July 1958) was an English first-class cricketer, who played six games for Yorkshire and Scotland from 1907 to 1912. A right arm fast medium bowler, he took 16 wickets at 34.06 each, with a best of 4 for 61 and, as a right-handed lower order batsman, scored 141 runs at 14.1, with a best of 32 and one catch.

Born in Armley, Leeds, Broadbent played for Leeds CC from 1898 to 1905, occasionally acting as twelfth man for Yorkshire. Broadbent joined Uddingston, Scotland, in 1906, taking over 500 wickets up to 1909, and in 1911, he took 105 wickets. Broadbent played for the Yorkshire second XI from 1908 to 1910. He joined Aberdeenshire as an amateur in 1912, and continued to play for them until 1928. He was appointed captain in 1924, and served on their committees from 1913 to 1936. He was a fine all-rounder in league cricket.

He became a publican in Aberdeen. Broadbent died there aged 79, in July 1958.
