= George Robert Broadbent =

George Robert Broadbent (3 November 1863 – 28 October 1947), was an Australian cycling champion and map publisher.

Broadbent was born in Ashby, Victoria, the son of George Adam Broadbent, (who migrated from Lancashire), and his wife Elizabeth, née Ruffhead. The family moved to North Melbourne and Broadbent attended the Errol Street school. On leaving school, he became a draper, like his father, and became an early bicycling and bicycle-racing enthusiast.

Broadbent held most Victorian and Australian cycling road records at various times. Two performances on solid tyres—203 miles (327 km) in 24 hours on a penny-farthing, and 100 miles (161 km) in 6 hours 20 minutes on a 'safety' bicycle—were never surpassed. The Australian Cyclist periodical described him 'the finest road rider that Australia has ever produced'. Broadbent won the five–mile Australasian championship for 1893-4 and the five-mile Victorian championship in 1894–5.

Broadbent married Louisa Santy at Richmond, Victoria on 29 December 1887.

Broadbent was a foundation councillor of the League of Victorian Wheelmen in October 1893. He contested the first Warrnambool-Melbourne race in 1895, and was active in the Good Roads Movement. In 1896 he issued a road map of Victoria, 'prepared ... after some sixteen years riding and touring in all parts of the Colony', which indicated general topography, distances, and roads classified as 'good', 'fair' or 'ridden with difficulty'. It became Victoria's standard road map.

Broadbent bought a steam-driven motor car in 1898, contributed regularly to the Argus and Australasian on both cycling and touring and, in December 1903, attended the meeting which established the (Royal) Automobile Club of Victoria. Broadbent was an active member of the Great Ocean Road Trust created in 1919 to establish a road from Barwon Heads to Warrnambool. Broadbent retired in December 1937; he was one of fifteen surviving founders to be elected life-members of the Royal Automobile Club of Victoria in May 1947.

Broadbent died at his home in Hawthorn, Victoria on 28 October 1947; he was survived by three sons and six of his seven daughters. His second son Robert Arthur (also an amateur and professional cycling champion) represented Australia at the 1924 Paris Olympic Games, succeeded him as tourist manager of the R.A.C.V. and established R. A. Broadbent-Tourist Publications in 1963. His youngest son Edward Albert took over Broadbent's Official Road Guides Co. in 1945.
