= Edward Broadbent =

Edward Broadbent could refer to:

- Ed Broadbent (1936–2024), Canadian politician
- Edward Broadbent (British Army officer) (1875–1944), British Army officer

== See also ==
- Edmund Hamer Broadbent (1861–1945), English Christian missionary
