= William Broadbent =

English neurologist (1835–1907)

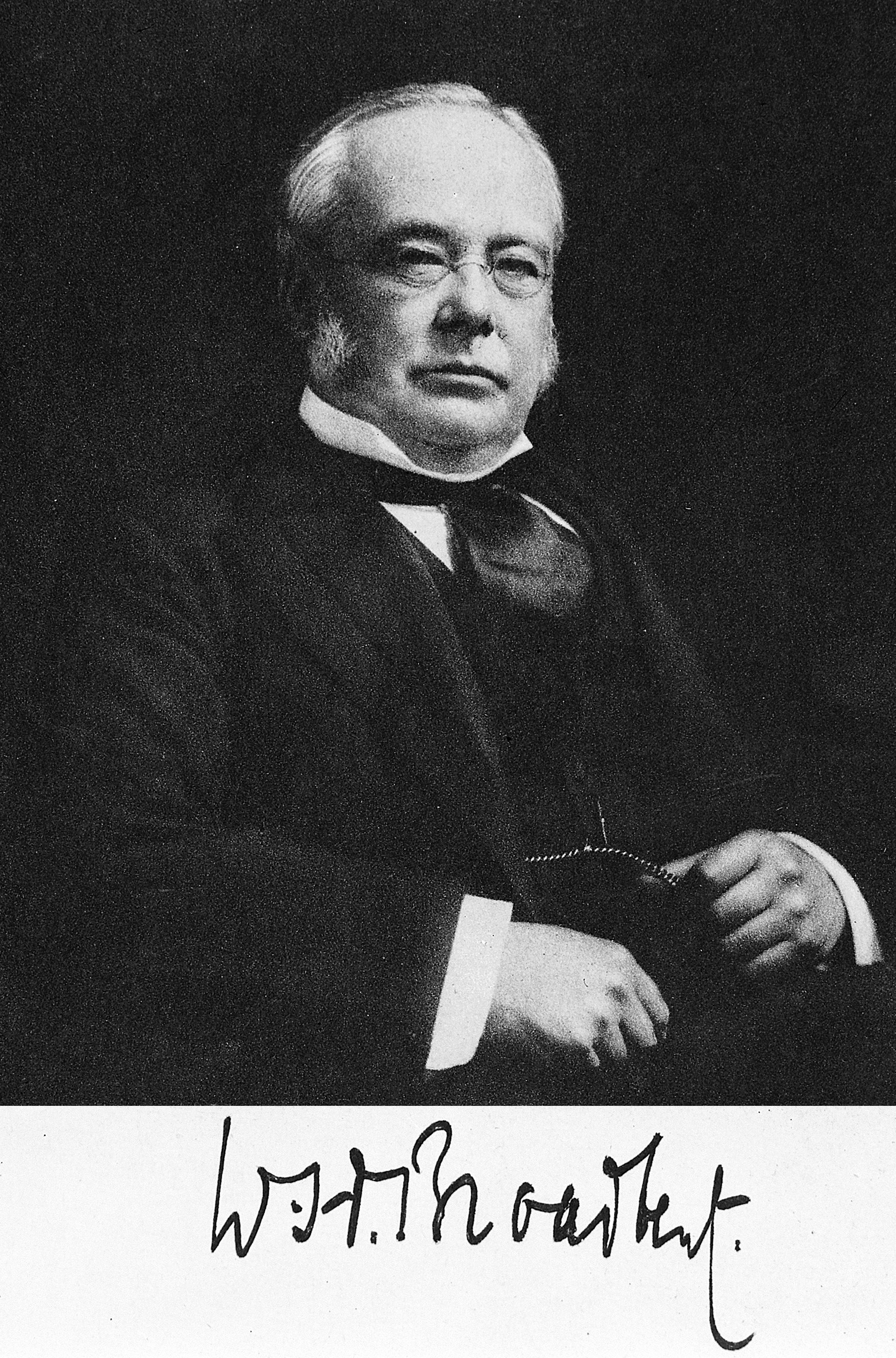

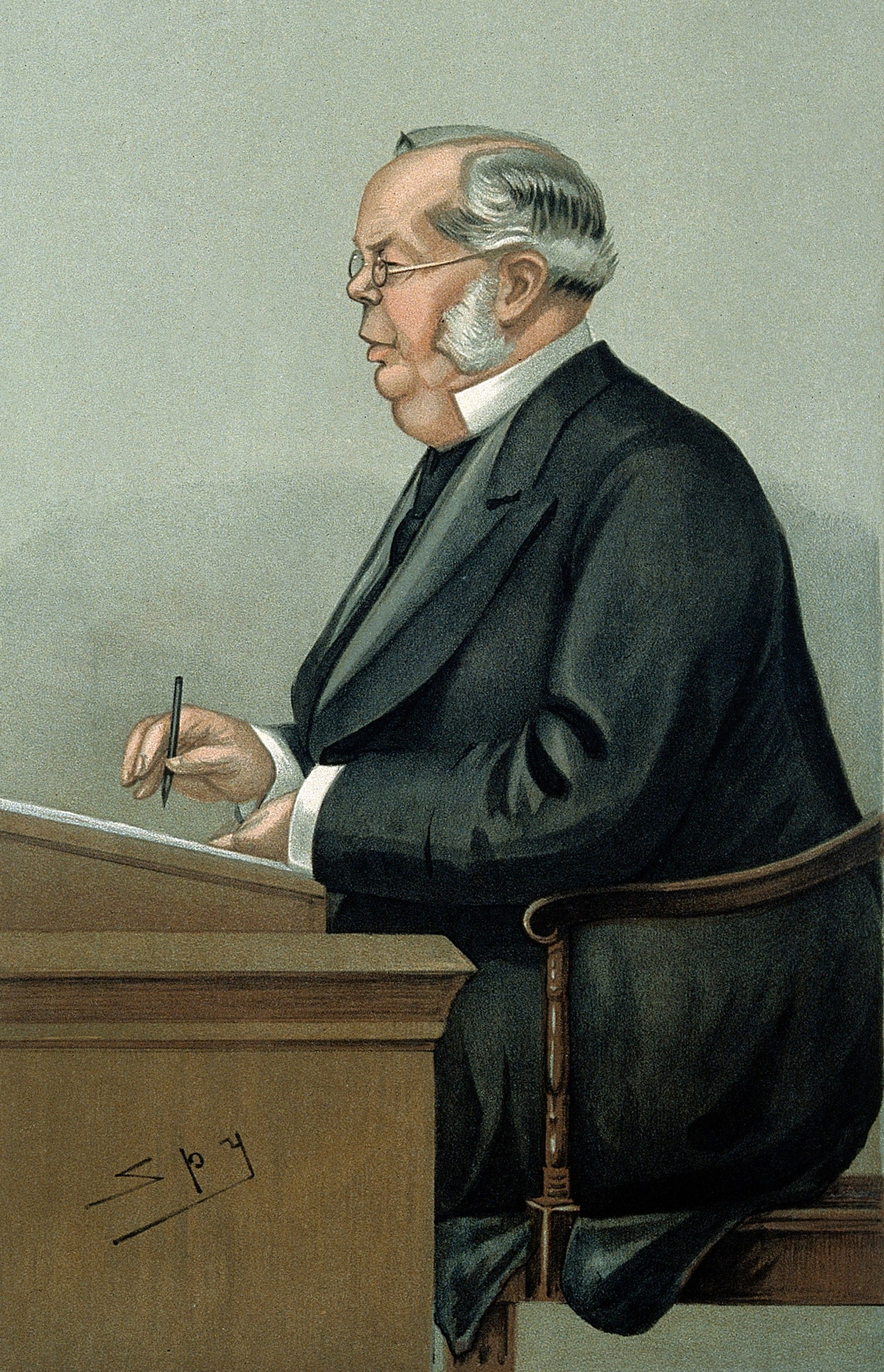
Broadbent as caricatured by Spy (Leslie Ward) in Vanity Fair, October 1902

Sir William Henry Broadbent, 1st Baronet KCVO FRS FRCP (23 January 1835 – 10 July 1907) was an English neurologist who was a leading British authority in the field of cardiology and neurology. He also performed research involving diseases such as tuberculosis and cancer. In 1881 he was elected President of the London Medical Society and in 1887 President of the Clinical Society of London. Broadbent was a Physician-Extraordinary to Queen Victoria and Physician-in-Ordinary to King Edward VII and the Prince of Wales.

== Early life and education ==
Broadbent was born at Longwood Edge in Lindley, now part of Huddersfield, West Yorkshire. He was the eldest of seven children born to John Broadbent, a wool manufacturer and prominent Wesleyan, and Esther (née Butterworth). His younger brother was Colonel John Edward Broadbent CB JP.

He was educated at Huddersfield College before he decided to study medicine. He was apprenticed to a doctor in Manchester before studying medicine at Owens College, and the Royal School of Medicine in Manchester. He studied in Paris in 1857 and returned in 1858 to pass the M.B. examination at Manchester.

== Career ==
In 1859, Broadbent took up a junior post at St Mary's Hospital, London, with which he was associated for much of his career (1859–1896). The next year he was elected physician to the London Fever Hospital. In 1865, he was promoted to physician in charge of patients at St. Mary's, and full physician in 1871. It was through his work at St. Mary's that Broadbent earned his reputation as an expert pathologist and outstanding clinical teacher. His areas of expertise included neurology and cardiology, as well as cancer and typhoid.

The months of November 1891 to October 1892 were critically important to Broadbent and his career, and gave him a narrow involvement in a notorious series of crimes. In November to December 1891 Broadbent was involved in saving the life of Prince George (the future King George V) from typhoid fever. At about the same time that he was involved in this he was sent a mysterious letter accusing him of murdering a prostitute named Matilda Clover the previous October with poison. This letter demanded a huge blackmail amount to avoid ruin. Broadbent wisely sent the letter to Scotland Yard. In January 1892, he was sent for by the Royal Family in an attempt to save Albert Victor, Duke of Clarence and Avondale, the older son of the Prince and Princess of Wales and "heir presumptive" to the throne of England. The Prince, known as "Prince Eddy" to the public (and nicknamed "Collars and Cuffs" due to some wardrobe choices he made) had caught a virulent strain of influenza. Broadbent tried everything he could to save the Duke, but on 14 January 1892 the Duke died. However, the Prince of Wales sent Broadbent a letter thanking him for his endeavours, that preserved for him and his wife one of their sons.

Then, in the late spring, Broadbent was informed of a police investigation into the deaths of a series of prostitutes in the Stepney and Lambeth areas of London that began in October 1891 and continued until April 1892. One of the victims was Matilda Clover, who had been classified as having died of natural causes, but the letter from the blackmailer to Broadbent gave details showing the woman had been poisoned.

An arrest was made in June 1892 of Dr Thomas Neill Cream for blackmailing another physician named Harper. Subsequently this was changed to a charge of murder for the poisoning of Matilda Clover. The trial of the defendant occurred in October 1892, with the charges including the attempted blackmail of Broadbent, and Broadbent's appearance as a witness. Cream was found guilty and sentenced to death, being hanged in November 1892.

Broadbent was a Physician-Extraordinary to Queen Victoria and Physician-in-Ordinary to King Edward VII and the Prince of Wales. In 1904, he was listed honorary medical staff at King Edward VII's Hospital for Officers.

== Honours ==
Broadbent received honorary doctorates from the universities of Edinburgh, where he obtained a M.D. with the thesis 'On the connection between diseases of the heart and apoplexy', St. Andrews, Leeds, McGill and Toronto.

Broadbent was created a baronet, of Brook Street and Longwood, in 1893. He was appointed a Knight Commander of the Royal Victorian Order in March 1901.

== Personal life ==
Broadbent married Eliza Harpin in 1863, and had three sons and three daughters:

- Mary Ethel (1864 – 10 March 1954)
- John Francis Harpin (16 October 1865 – 27 January 1946)
- William Herbert (10 April 1867 – 17 May 1867)
- Walter (4 August 1868 – 17 October 1951)
- Gertrude (1870 – 2 August 1905)
- Eliza Madeleine (1872 – 17 December 1949)

His sons John and Walter also became physicians.

He died at his home in London in 1907, following an eighth-month illness that began with pneumonia. His eldest son succeeded him in the baronetcy.

== Associated eponyms ==
- Broadbent apoplexy: A type of stroke caused by a cerebral haemorrhage into the ventricular system.
- Broadbent sign: Recession of the intercostal spaces (near the eleventh and twelfth ribs on the left side of the back) as a sign of adherent pericardium (this sign was first described by his son, Walter Broadbent, in 1895).
- Broadbent inverted sign: Pulsations synchronising with ventricular systole on the posterior lateral wall of the chest in gross dilatation of the left atrium.
- Broadbent law: Medical law that states "lesions of the upper segment of the motor tract cause less marked paralysis of muscles that habitually produce bilateral movements than of those that commonly act independently of the opposite side".

== Selected writings ==
- Cancer: A New Method of Treatment (London, 1866)
- The Practice of Medicine, (revised by Sir William Broadbent; 7th ed., London 1875)
- The Pulse (largely a reproduction of the Croonian Lectures, 1887), (London, 1890)
- Heart Disease, With Special Reference to Prognosis and Treatment, (with John Francis Harpin Broadbent), (London, 1897)

== Works cited ==
- Biography of Willam Henry Broadbent
- Stone, R. W. (Winter 1991). The Criminoligist. 4. Vol. 15. Barry Rose Law Periodicals. pp. 224–244. "Jeffrey Bloomfield, 'The Doctor wrote some letters'"

Baronetage of the United Kingdom
New creation	Baronet (of Brook Street and Longwood); 1893–1907	Succeeded by John Broadbent
