= Peter Broadbent =

Peter Broadbent may refer to:

- Pete Broadbent (born 1952), Bishop of Willesden in the Church of England
- Peter Broadbent (footballer) (1933–2013), English international footballer
- Peter Broadbent (conductor) MBE, English choral conductor
