= Sir John Broadbent, 2nd Baronet =

English physician (1865–1946)

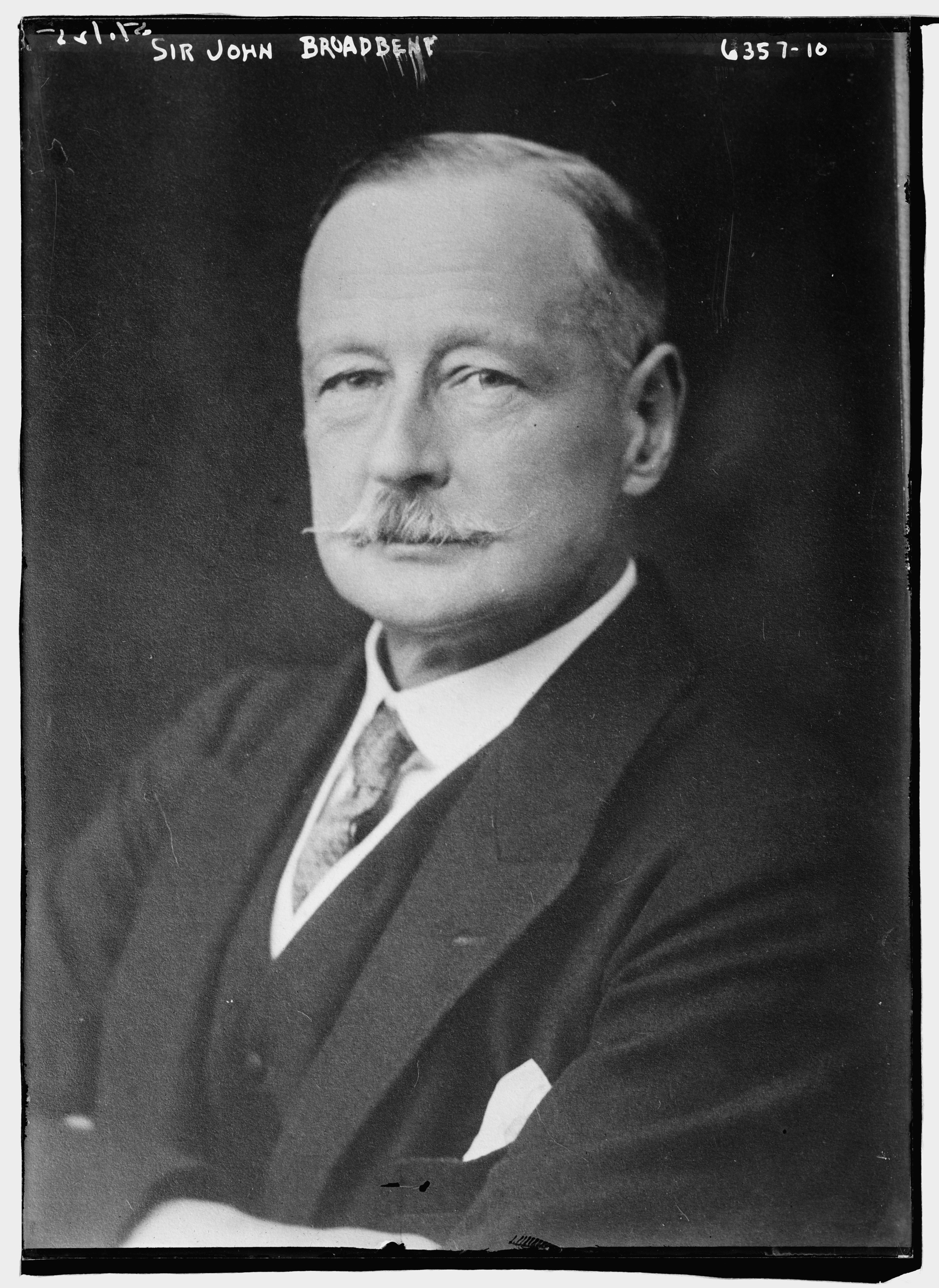
Sir John Broadbent in 1925

Sir John Francis Harpin Broadbent, 2nd Baronet, FRCP (16 October 1865 – 21 January 1946) was an English physician at St Mary's Hospital, London.

He was the elder son of the neurologist Sir William Henry Broadbent, 1st Baronet and his wife Eliza née Harpin. John was educated at Rugby School and Hertford College, Oxford. He entered St. Mary's Hospital while his father was still an active staff member. He was dean of the Medical School from 1910 to 1920. In 1908 he was secretary of the Section of Medicine at the Sheffield Meeting of the British Medical Association.

With his father William, John wrote Heart Disease and Aneurism of the Aorta in 1897, fourth edition in 1906.

He contributed the Rheumatism and Heart articles for the 1911 Encyclopædia Britannica.

== See also ==
- Broadbent baronets

Baronetage of the United Kingdom
Preceded by William Broadbent	Baronet (of Longwood and Brook Street); 1907–1946	Succeeded by William Francis Broadbent
