= Tommy Johansson (speedway rider) =

Swedish speedway rider

- Born: 21 October 1950 (age 76); Tveta, Sweden
- Nationality: Swedish

Career history

Sweden
- 1967-1970, 1972-1979: Dackarna
- 1971: Bysarna
- 1980-1982, 1984: Skepparna

Great Britain
- 1971: Newport Wasps
- 1972: Ipswich Witches
- 1975: Hull Vikings

Individual honours
- 1973: Swedish Championship
- 1974: Speedway World Championship finalist

Team honours
- 1971: Allsvenskan Champion
- 1972: Allsvenskan Div 2 East Champion
- 1967, 1968: Allsvenskan Div 3 East Champion

Leif Tommy Johansson (born 21 October 1950) is a former motorcycle speedway rider from Sweden. He earned 32 caps for the Sweden national speedway team.

== Speedway career ==
Johansson is a former champion of Sweden, winning the Swedish Championship in 1973. He reached the final of the Speedway World Championship during the 1974 Individual Speedway World Championship.

Johansson rode in the top tier of British Speedway from 1971 until 1975, riding for various clubs. He rode for Newport Wasps, Ipswich Witches and Hull Vikings.

== World Final Appearances ==
=== Individual World Championship ===
- 1974 - (Sweden) Gothenburg, Ullevi - 7th - 8pts
