= Pete Smith (speedway rider, born 1942) =

English motorcycle speedway rider

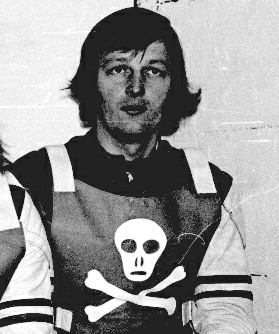
- Pete Smith (Poole Pirate)
- Born: 11 July 1942 (age 84); Hanworth, England
- Nationality: British (English)

Career history
- 1962-1977: Poole Pirates

Team honours
- 1969: British League Champion
- 1963, 1964: Provincial Southern League Winner

Peter Arthur Smith (born 11 July 1942, in Hanworth, England) is a former international motorcycle speedway rider from England, who spent his entire career with the Poole Pirates. He earned seven international caps for the England national speedway team and two caps for the Great Britain team.

== Career ==
Smith began riding speedway motorcycles at the training track at Rye House Stadium in the early 1960s. In 1962, Smith took part in a number of second-half meetings at Wimborne Road and made his first full appearance for Poole at a challenge match at Rye House. He continued to improve at Poole and by 1968, Smith had become the Pirates third heat-leader. Poole won the British League championship in 1969 and Smith rose to the number one position at the club with an average of 9.52. Smith also made his first international appearances for England in 1969 against Australia, New Zealand and Scotland. He was made Poole's captain in 1971 and continued to ride for the club until his retirement from the sport in 1977.

Smith made 620 appearances for Poole Pirates during his 15 years career establishing a club record.
