= Thomas Biggin Broadbent =

English preacher

- Born: 17 March 1793; Warrington
- Died: 9 November 1817 (aged 24)
- Occupation: Preacher

Thomas Biggin Broadbent (1793–1817), was an English preacher.

== Life ==
Broadbent was the only child of William Broadbent and was born at Warrington on 17 March 1793. He entered Glasgow College in November 1809. After graduating in April 1813, he became classical tutor in the Unitarian academy at Hackney, an office he filled till 1816, preaching latterly at Prince's Street Chapel, Westminster, during a vacancy. His pulpit powers were remarkable. Resigning his London work, he returned to Warrington to pursue his ministerial training as his father's assistant. He died of apoplexy on 9 November 1817.

== Writings ==
He prepared for the press, in 1816, portions (1 and 2 Cor., 1 Tim., and Titus) of Thomas Belsham's Epistles of Paul the Apostle, published in four volumes in 1822. He also edited the fourth edition (1817) of the "Improved Version" of the New Testament, originally published in 1808 under Belsham's superintendence. Two of his sermons, published posthumously in 1817, reached a second edition.
