= Harry Broadbent =

Harry Broadbent may refer to:

- Harry Frank Broadbent (1910–1958), British pilot
- Punch Broadbent (1892–1971), Canadian ice hockey player
- Harry Broadbent (born 1975), British keyboardist, member of Kula Shaker
