= Tom Broadbent (Australian footballer) =

Australian rules footballer (born 1936)

Personal information
- Full name: Thomas Broadbent
- Born: 12 November 1936 (age 89)
- Original team: Sandgate
- Height: 180 cm (5 ft 11 in)
- Weight: 73 kg (161 lb)

Playing career^{1}
Years	Club	Games (Goals)
1957	Fitzroy	1 (0)
- ^{1} Playing statistics correct to the end of 1957.

Thomas Broadbent (born 12 November 1936) is a former Australian rules footballer who played with Fitzroy in the Victorian Football League (VFL).

Broadbent, a full-forward from Sandgate, had only a brief stint at Fitzroy. He played in Fitzroy's win over Richmond at Brunswick Street Oval in round 15 and didn't feature again.

He was a dual winner of the Queensland Australian National Football League leading goal-kicker award, with 72 goals in 1953 and 86 goals in 1960. A member of Sandgate's 1956 premiership side, Broadbent was regularly picked for the Queensland interstate team in the 1950s. He captained Queensland when he was just 20 years of age and on one occasion kicked a nine-goal haul against New South Wales.
