= William Broadbent (minister) =

William Broadbent (28 August 1755 – 1 December 1827, Latchford), was an English Unitarian minister.

== Life ==
William Broadbent, the son of William and Elizabeth Broadbent, was born 28 August 1755. He was educated for the ministry at Daventry Academy from August 1777 to June 1782, first under Thomas Robins, who resigned the divinity chair in June 1781 from loss of voice, and afterwards under Thomas Belsham. Broadbent became classical tutor to the academy in August 1782, and in January 1784 he exchanged this appointment for that of tutor in mathematics, natural philosophy, and logic. Belsham resigned the divinity chair in June 1789, having become a Unitarian, and the academy was removed in November to Northampton. Broadbent continued to act as tutor till the end of 1791, when he became minister at Warrington (he took out his licence on 18 Jan. 1792), and removed to Cockey Moor. At this time his views were of the average Daventry type. But at Warrington he re-examined his theological convictions, and becoming a Unitarian of the Belsham school, he succeeded in carrying nearly all his congregation with him. Broadbent from his eighteenth year kept up a close friendship with Belsham; some fragments of their correspondence are published in Williams's chaotic Memoirs of Belsham (1833, 8vo). Biblical exegesis was Broadbent's favourite study, and textual interpretation played a prominent part in his preaching. He resigned his Warrington charge in the spring of 1822, induced by broken health and the depressing effects of the loss of his son. He died at Latchford, near Warrington, on 1 December 1827, and was buried in the Warrington chapel on 6 December.

His son was Thomas Biggin Broadbent.
