= Benjamin Broadbent =

Benjamin Broadbent may refer to:

- Ben Broadbent (born 1965), British economist
- Benjamin Broadbent (builder) (1813–1862), English master builder, stonemason and architect
