= Public Money & Management =

- Discipline: Accounting, Business and management
- Language: English
- Edited by: Andrew Massey

Publication details
- History: 1981–present
- Publisher: Routledge
- Frequency: 8/year

Standard abbreviations
- ISO 4: Public Money Manag.

Indexing
- ISSN: 0954-0962 (print); 1467-9302 (web)

Links
- Journal homepage

Public Money & Management is a peer-reviewed academic journal that was established by the Chartered Institute of Public Finance and Accountancy in 1981 as Public Money to be "an independent journal to promote discussion of public sector policy making". The journal obtained its current title in 1988. It is published by Routledge and the editor-in-chief is Andrew Massey.
