= Broadbent baronets =

Baronetcy in the Baronetage of the United Kingdom

- Escutcheon of the Broadbent baronets of Longwood and Brook Street
- Creation date: 1893
- Status: dormant
- Motto: To excel always

The Broadbent Baronetcy, of Longwood in the Parish of Huddersfield in the West Riding of the County of York, and of Brook Street, in the Parish of St George Hanover Square in the County of London, is a title in the Baronetage of the United Kingdom. It was created on 10 August 1893 for the noted physician William Broadbent, personal physician to Queen Victoria. The title descended from father to son until the death of his grandson, the third Baronet, in 1987. The late Baronet was succeeded by his first cousin once removed, the fourth Baronet. He was the grandson of Walter Broadbent, third son of the first Baronet.

As of 2023 the baronetcy is considered dormant.

== Broadbent baronets, of Longwood and Brook Street (1893) ==
- Sir William Henry Broadbent, 1st Baronet (1835–1907)
- Sir John Broadbent, 2nd Baronet (1865–1946)
- Sir William Francis Broadbent, 3rd Baronet (1904–1987)
- Sir George Walter Broadbent, 4th Baronet (1935–1992)
- Andrew George Broadbent, presumed 5th Baronet (born 1963). He succeeded his father in 1992, but his name is not on the Official Roll. His heir is his cousin Charles Richard Broadbent (born 1968).

Baronetage of the United Kingdom
Preceded by Ingram baronets	Broadbent baronets of Longwood and Brook Street; 10 August 1893	Succeeded by Knill baronets
