= Bob Valentine (speedway rider) =

Australian speedway rider (1940–2026)

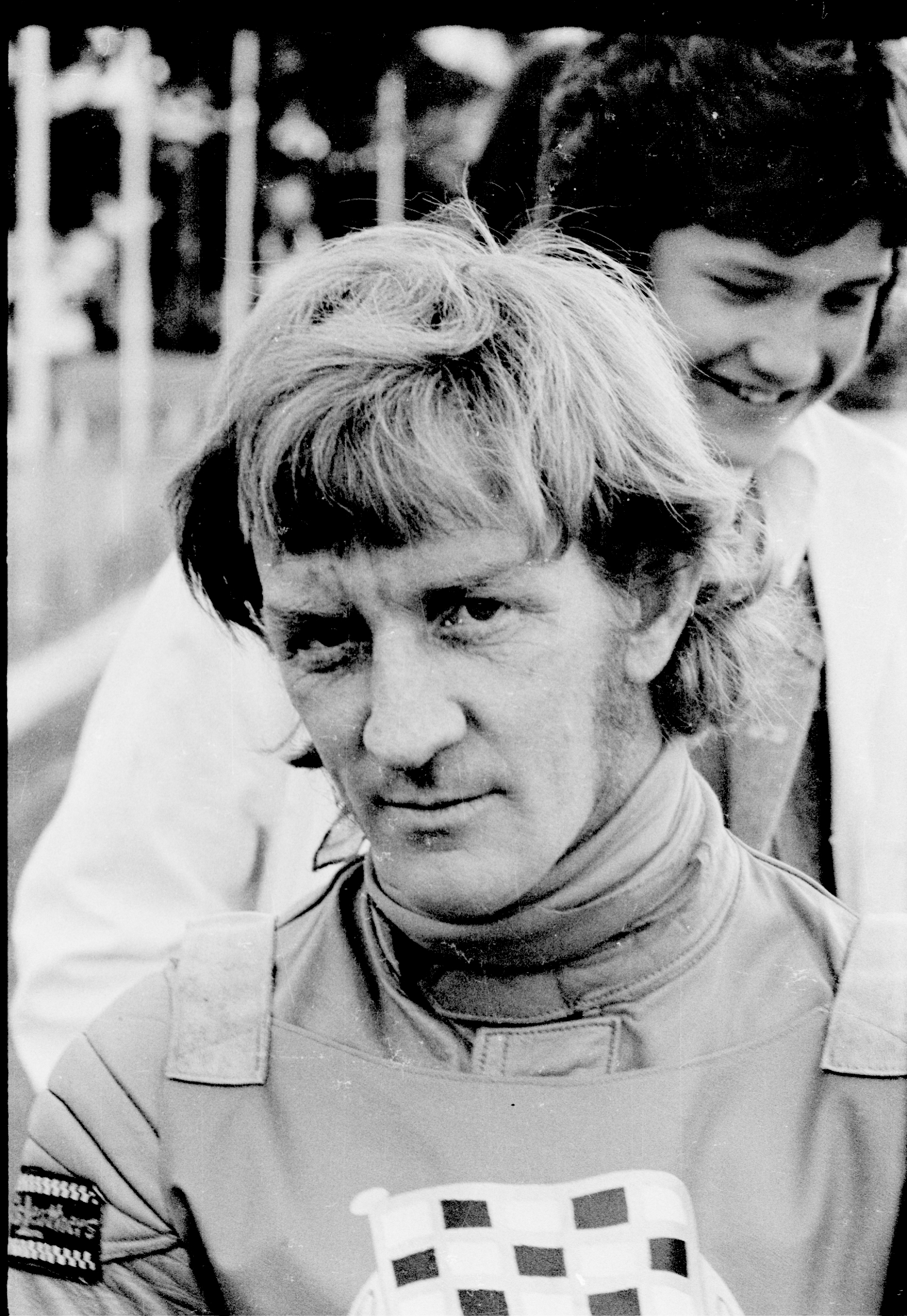
- Born: 19 April 1940; Newcastle, New South Wales, Australia
- Died: 20 January 2026 (aged 85); Australia
- Nationality: Australian

Career history
- 1970: Workington Comets
- 1970–1974: Sheffield Tigers
- 1975: Coventry Bees
- 1976: Birmingham Brummies
- 1977: Cradley Heathens

Individual honours
- 1973, 1974: British Speedway Championship finalist
- 1973: NSW State Champion

Team honours
- 1974: British League KO Cup winner
- 1973, 1974: Northern Trophy

Robert John Valentine (19 April 1940 – 20 January 2026) was an Australian international motorcycle speedway rider.

== Speedway career ==
Valentine joined Workington Comets in 1970 and rode in the top two tiers of British Speedway from 1970 to 1977, riding for various clubs. He was a finalist at the British Speedway Championship in 1973 and 1974.

Valentine earned 24 caps for the Australia national speedway team.

== Death ==
Valentine died in Australia on 20 January 2026, at the age of 85.
