= Bob Kilby =

British speedway rider

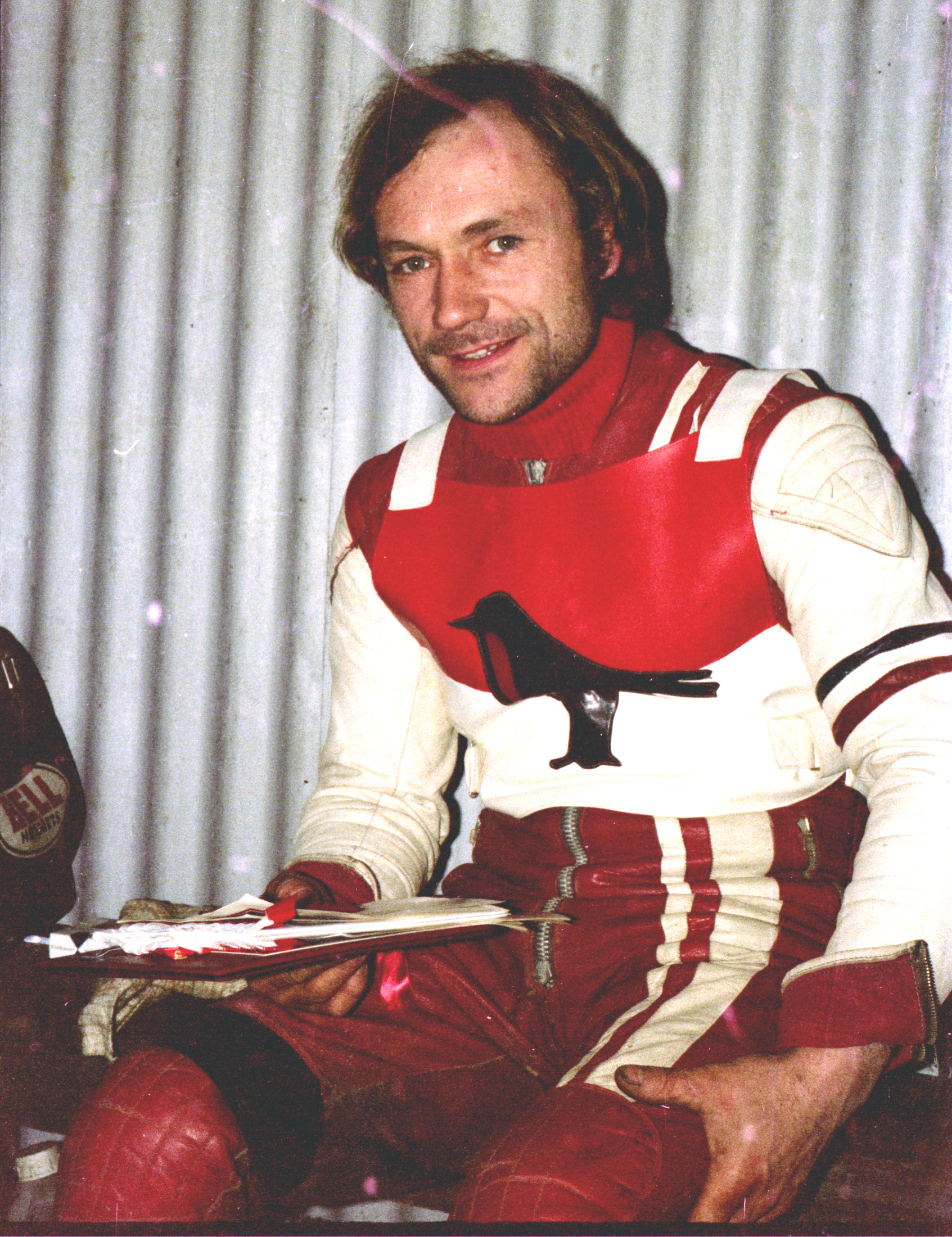
- Born: 23 September 1944; Swindon, England
- Died: 11 January 2009 (aged 64); Swindon, England
- Nationality: British (English)

Career history
- 1964–1970, 1975–1980, 1983: Swindon Robins
- 1971–1973: Exeter Falcons
- 1973–1974: Oxford Rebels

Team honours
- 1967: British League Winner
- 1967, 1968: Midland Cup Winner

Robert Stanley Kilby (23 September 1944 – 11 January 2009) was a motorcycle speedway rider from England, who rode for the Swindon Robins, Oxford Rebels and Exeter Falcons. He earned 37 international caps for the England national speedway team and five caps for the Great Britain team.

== Speedway career ==
From the start of his career in 1964 to its end in 1983, Kilby rode some 2,226 times over 556 meetings, and amassed a total of 4,192 points. He was a member of the Robins' British League title-winning team of 1967.

Kilby also won the Midland Cup on two occasions with the club in 1967 and 1968. He returned to Swindon in 1975 after two seasons with the Oxford Rebels.

Kilby died on 11 January 2009 at his home in Stratton St Margaret, Swindon.

Kilby's son, Lee, wrote a biography of his father "To the Heart of Kilb".
