= Rick France =

British motorcycle speedway rider (1938–2024)

- Born: 12 July 1938; Birmingham, England
- Died: 24 January 2024 (aged 85)
- Nationality: British (English)

Career history
- 1960-1972: Coventry Bees
- 1961: Middlesbrough Bears
- 1962: Leicester Hunters
- 1963: Wolverhampton Wolves
- 1973: Sheffield Tigers
- 1974-1975: Halifax Dukes

Individual honours
- 1967: Speedway World Championship finalist

Team honours
- 1968: British League Champion
- 1967: British League KO Cup Winner
- 1963: Provincial League Champion
- 1966, 1969, 1970: Midland Cup
- 1973: Northern Trophy

Derek Edward Rick France (12 July 1938 – 24 January 2024) was an international motorcycle speedway rider from England.

== Speedway career ==
France reached the final of the Speedway World Championship in the 1967 Individual Speedway World Championship.

France rode in the top tier of British Speedway from 1960 to 1975, riding primarily for Coventry Bees. He was capped by the England national speedway team once and Great Britain four times.

== World final appearances ==
=== Individual World Championship ===
- 1967 – (England) London, Wembley Stadium – 12th – 5pts

== Death ==
France died on 24 January 2024, at the age of 85.
