= Crewe Stadium =

Former multi-use stadium

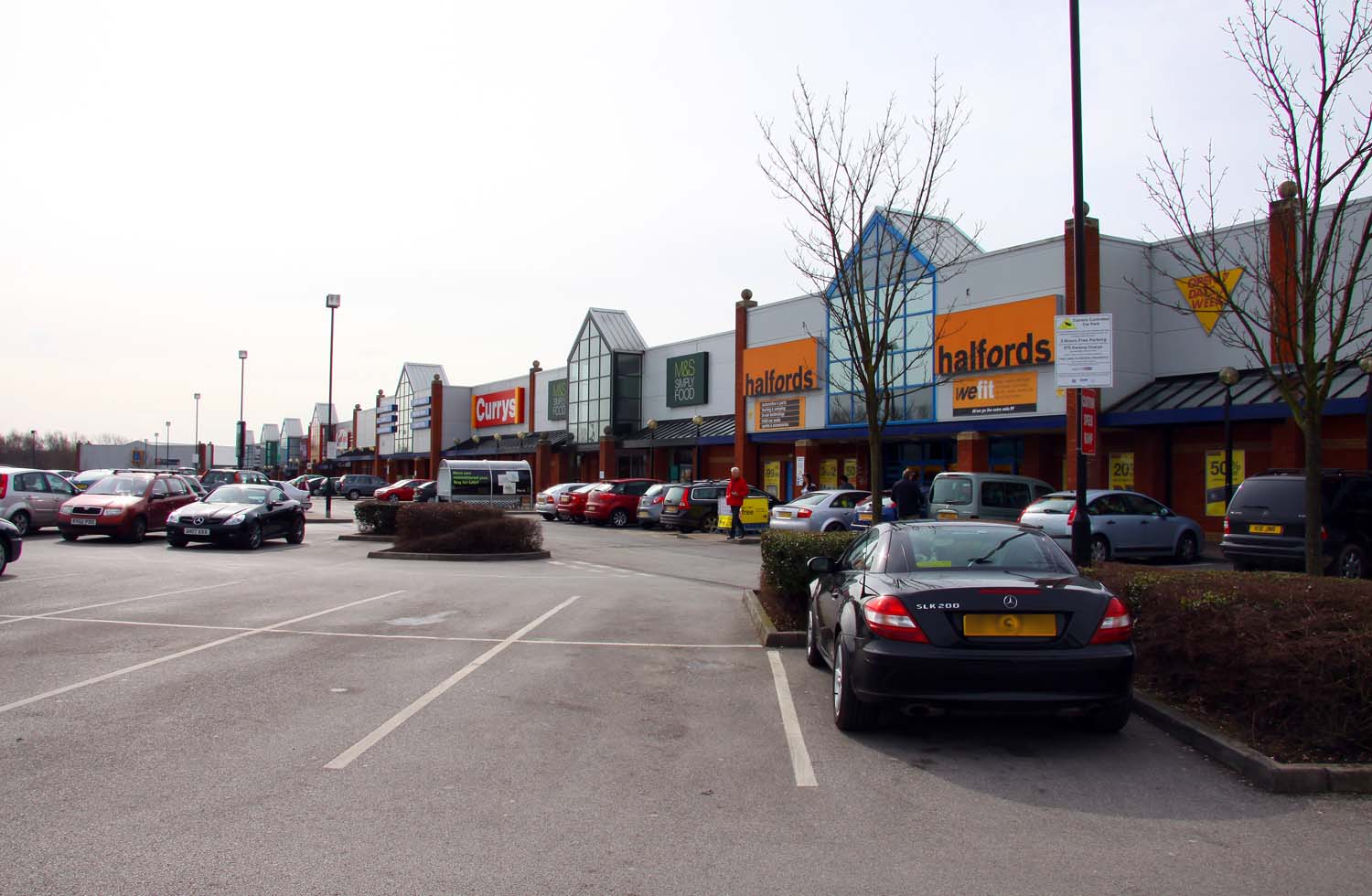
- Retail park on the site of the former Crewe Stadium (2010)
- Interactive map of Crewe Stadium
- Location: Crewe, Cheshire, England
- Coordinates: 53°05′45″N 2°26′04″W

Construction
- Opened: 1898
- Closed: 1993

Crewe Stadium, also known by several other names including, Earle Street, LMR Sports Ground and BR Sports Ground, was a stadium in Crewe, Cheshire, England. Located north of Crewe railway station, it was used for speedway and stock car racing. The track was redeveloped in 1993 and is now the site of a retail park.

== History ==
A motorcycle speedway track operated for a short time in the late 1920s / early 1930s, at the London Midland Region (L.M.R) Sports Ground, as it was known at the time. Previously also used as a cycling and athletics track, it encircled a cricket pitch that was used by Crewe Alexandra cricket club from 1898 (following its relocation from the Alexandra Recreation Ground on Nantwich Road), and by its successor, Crewe LMR Cricket Club until 1975.

In 1969, Maurice Littlechild of Allied Presentations formed a speedway team to compete at the Sports Ground. The set up costs exceeded £10,000 and the team were given the nickname the Crewe Kings. The team ran from 1969 until 1975, when it closed down due to financial difficulties.

The track was a 434-metre-long (475 yd) banked shale surfaced oval and was built on what was previously an athletics ground.

During the closed season of 1970–71 the track was shortened to 397 metres (434 yards).

From 1981, BriSCA Formula 2 Stock Cars raced at the stadium and the following year from 1982, BriSCA F1 Stock Cars promoted by a local businessman called Jim Barrie started to race at the stadium. The F2 World Final was held in 1993, the biggest Oval Track the F2's raced on. It also hosted V8 Hotstox, and various other forms of oval motor sport including National Hot Rods, Banger racing, Ministox and Rebels. The very last meeting held was on 11 December 1993.

On 17 September 2010, the speedway team and stadium was commemorated, with a plaque unveiling at the Kings Arms on Earle Street.
