= Eric Broadbelt =

English speedway rider (born 1947)

- Born: 8 December 1947 (age 78); Blackpool, England
- Nationality: British (English)

Career history
- 1967–1973: Belle Vue Aces
- 1968–1969: Belle Vue Colts
- 1970: Rochdale Hornets
- 1974–1977: Poole Pirates
- 1978: Halifax Dukes
- 1979–1981: Sheffield Tigers
- 1982: Swindon Robins
- 1982, 1983: Edinburgh Monarchs
- 1983, 1986: Long Eaton Invaders
- 1985: Barrow Blackhawks
- 1985: Glasgow Tigers

Individual honours
- 1981: British Championship finalist

Team honours
- 1971, 1972, 1973: British League Champion
- 1972, 1973: British League KO Cup Winner
- 1968, 1969: British League Division Two Champion
- 1969: British League Division Two KO Cup Winner
- 1979: Northern Trophy

Eric Melvyn Broadbelt (born 8 December 1947) is a former international speedway rider from England and Great Britain.

== Speedway career ==
Broadbelt a product of the Manchester training school, began his British league career riding for the Belle Vue Aces during the 1967 British League season. He won the league title with Manchester club in both 1970, 1971 and 1972 and the British League KO Cup in 1972 and 1973.

After a hugely successful career with Belle Vue, Broadbelt joined Poole Pirates for the 1974 British League season and stayed with the south coast club for three seasons. He then moved north to ride for Halifax in 1978 and Sheffield for 1979 and 1980.

Broadbelt reached the final of the British Speedway Championship in 1981. He spent five more seasons riding for various clubs but only made a handful of appearances for most of them before retiring in 1986.

At retirement, Broadbelt had earned 17 international caps for the England national speedway team and 14 caps for Great Britain.
