= Chris Pusey (speedway rider) =

British motorcycle speedway rider

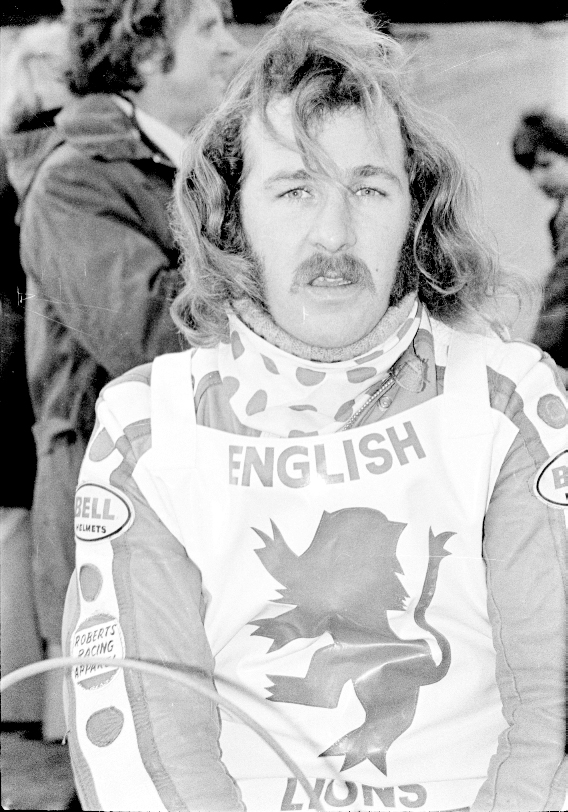
- Born: 28 March 1950; Maghull, Sefton, Merseyside
- Died: October 2002 (aged 52)
- Nationality: British (English)

Career history
- 1967–1974: Belle Vue Aces
- 1975–1978: Halifax Dukes
- 1980: Weymouth Wildcats
- 1981: Workington Comets

Individual honours
- 1970, 1975, 1976: British Championship finalist

Team honours
- 1970, 1971, 1972: British League Champion
- 1972, 1973: British League KO Cup Winner

Christopher Frederick Pusey (28 March 1950 – October 2002) was an international motorcycle speedway rider from England. He earned 51 international caps for the England national speedway team.

== Speedway career ==
Pusey attended Ormonde High School and participated in grasstrack before beginning his British leagues career, making a single appearance for Belle Vue Aces during the 1967 British League season.

Pusey rode for Belle Vue in the top tier of British Speedway from 1968 to 1974 and built his average up over the years to peak at an impressive 10.55 in 1973. He was part of the league winning team that won three consecutive championships from 1970 to 1972.

In 1975, Pusey joined the Halifax Dukes becoming their leading rider for three seasons. He reached the final of the British Speedway Championship on three occasions in 1970, 1975 and 1975.
