= East German Individual Speedway Championship =

East German motorcycle speedway championship

- Sport: Motorcycle speedway
- Founded: 1962
- Folded: 1990
- Most titles: Diethelm Triemer (7)

The East German Individual Speedway Championship was the national individual motorcycle speedway championship of East Germany. It was first held in 1962 and continued until 1990, the year of German reunification.

== History ==
The inaugural championship was held in 1962 and was won by Jürgen Hehlert. Hehlert won a second title in 1966 and remained one of East Germany's leading international riders before defecting to West Germany in 1972. He continued his career in the West and represented West Germany in 1974.

Jochen Dinse won six titles between 1963 and 1973, including three consecutive championships from 1963 to 1965. Hans Jürgen Fritz won three successive titles from 1970 to 1972. Dieter Tetzlaff won five titles, including three consecutively from 1978 to 1980.

Diethelm Triemer finished runner-up in 1980 before winning seven consecutive championships from 1981 to 1987, a competition record. His winning run ended in 1988, when a tyre failure in the final championship round at Neubrandenburg cost him the chance of an eighth successive title and left him with the bronze medal.

The final East German championship was held in 1990 and was won by Mike Ott. An Ostdeutsche Bahnmeisterschaft was staged over two rounds in 1991 following German reunification, but it was unofficial and is not counted as an East German championship.

== Past winners ==
Year	Venues	Winner	Second	Third
1962	4 rounds Brieske; Meißen; Stralsund; Neubrandenburg	Jürgen Hehlert	Günter Schelenz	Wolfgang Krug
1963	4 rounds Stralsund; Neubrandenburg; Brieske; Meißen	Jochen Dinse	Günter Schelenz	Jürgen Rudolph
1964	3 rounds Güstrow; Neubrandenburg; Meißen	Jochen Dinse	Günter Schelenz	Hans Jürgen Fritz
1965	2 rounds Neubrandenburg; Brieske	Jochen Dinse	Hans Jürgen Fritz	Jürgen Hehlert
1966	2 rounds Neubrandenburg; Rostock	Jürgen Hehlert	Bruno Bülau	Günter Schelenz
1967	4 rounds Güstrow; Rostock; Meißen; Brieske	Jochen Dinse	Peter Liebing	Jürgen Hehlert
1968	4 rounds Stralsund; Rostock; Güstrow; Meißen	Jochen Dinse	Gerhard Uhlenbrock	Jürgen Hehlert
1969	6 rounds Neubrandenburg; Güstrow; Rostock; Meißen; Brieske; Stralsund	Peter Liebing	Jochen Dinse	Gerhard Uhlenbrock
1970	6 rounds Brieske; Güstrow; Rostock; Meißen; Neubrandenburg; Stralsund	Hans Jürgen Fritz	Jürgen Hehlert	Peter Liebing
1971	6 rounds Meißen; Brieske; Güstrow; Rostock; Neubrandenburg; Stralsund	Hans Jürgen Fritz	Jürgen Hehlert	Jochen Dinse
1972	6 rounds Neubrandenburg; Brieske; Güstrow; Rostock; Stralsund; Meißen	Hans Jürgen Fritz	Clemens Bever	Dieter Tetzlaff
1973	6 rounds Güstrow; Rostock; Neubrandenburg; Stralsund; Brieske; Meißen	Jochen Dinse	Clemens Bever	Peter Liebing
1974	5 rounds Güstrow; Meißen; Neubrandenburg; Stralsund; Rostock	Dieter Tetzlaff	Hans Jürgen Fritz	Wilfried Schneider
1975	5 rounds Neubrandenburg; Stralsund; Meißen; Güstrow; Rostock	Clemens Bever	Dieter Tetzlaff	Rolf Perner
1976	5 rounds Güstrow; Stralsund; Meißen; Neubrandenburg; Rostock	Dieter Tetzlaff	Clemens Bever	Jochen Dinse
1977	5 rounds Stralsund; Güstrow; Neubrandenburg; Meißen; Rostock	Hartmut Ernst	Clemens Bever	Dieter Tetzlaff
1978	5 rounds Neubrandenburg; Stralsund; Güstrow; Meißen; Rostock	Dieter Tetzlaff	Werner Mell	Joachim Mell
1979	6 rounds Neubrandenburg; Stralsund; Güstrow; Lübbenau; Meißen; Rostock	Dieter Tetzlaff	Dietmar Lieschke	Clemens Bever
1980	5 rounds Neubrandenburg; Rostock; Stralsund; Leipzig; Güstrow	Dieter Tetzlaff	Diethelm Triemer	Dietmar Lieschke
1981	5 rounds Güstrow; Neubrandenburg; Rostock; Leipzig; Meißen	Diethelm Triemer	Clemens Bever	Dieter Tetzlaff
1982	6 rounds Leipzig; Meißen; Neubrandenburg; Stralsund; Güstrow; Rostock	Diethelm Triemer	Werner Mell	Dietmar Lieschke
1983	6 rounds Leipzig; Meißen; Neubrandenburg; Güstrow; Rostock; Lübbenau	Diethelm Triemer	Jürgen Schumann	Thomas Fröbel
1984	5 rounds Leipzig; Ludwigslust; Güstrow; Neubrandenburg; Meißen	Diethelm Triemer	Norbert Gümmer	Thomas Fröbel
1985	5 rounds Güstrow; Neubrandenburg; Leipzig; Meißen; Ludwigslust	Diethelm Triemer	Ralf Peters	Herbert Mussehl
1986	5 rounds Leipzig; Güstrow; Neubrandenburg; Meißen; Ludwigslust	Diethelm Triemer	Joachim Mell	Ralf Peters
1987	3 rounds Güstrow; Neubrandenburg; Lübbenau	Diethelm Triemer	Herbert Mussehl	Ralf Peters
1988	4 rounds Leipzig; Güstrow; Lübbenau; Neubrandenburg	Herbert Mussehl	Thomas Fröbel	Diethelm Triemer
1989	4 rounds Güstrow; Meißen; Neubrandenburg; Lübbenau	Joachim Mell	Mike Ott	Ralf Peters
1990	4 rounds Teterow; Neubrandenburg; Stralsund; Güstrow	Mike Ott	Thomas Diehr	Thomas Hopp

== See also ==
- German Individual Speedway Championship
- East German Team Speedway Championship
- East Germany national speedway team
- Sport in East Germany
