= Boris Samorodov =

Soviet speedway rider

- Born: 26 September 1931; Rybinsk, Yaroslavl Oblast, Soviet Union
- Died: 13 February 2016 (aged 84)
- Nationality: Russian

Career history

Soviet Union
- 1960–1967: Ufa

Individual honours
- 1967: Ice World Champion
- 1963, 1964: Speedway World Championship finalist
- 1962, 1964: Soviet Champion

Boris Alexandrovich Samorodov (1931-2016) was an international speedway rider from the Soviet Union.

== Speedway career ==
Samorodov became a World Champion after winning the gold medal at the 1967 Individual Ice Speedway World Championship. He also reached the final of the Speedway World Championship in the 1963 Individual Speedway World Championship.

Samorodov was twice the champion of the Soviet Union, winning the title in 1962 and 1964. In 1964, he was part of the Soviet Union team that toured Britain for the first time and later that year he reached his second world final, after reaching the final of the 1964 Individual Speedway World Championship, on 11 September, which was held at the Ullevi in Sweden. He finished fourth just missing out on the podium. In 1965, he toured the United Kingdom again as part of the Soviet Union national team.

== World final appearances ==
=== Individual Ice Speedway World Championship ===
- 1966 - (Soviet Union) 2 rounds, 5th - 35pts
- 1967 – (Soviet Union) Ufa & Moscow – Champion – 57pts
- 1968 - (Soviet Union) 2 rounds, 3rd - 51pts
- 1969 - (West Germany) Inzell, 5th - 10pts
- 1973 – (West Germany) Inzell, 2nd – 25pts
- 1974 – (Sweden) Nässjö, 5th – 10pts

=== Individual World Championship ===
- 1963 – (England) London, Wembley Stadium – 4th – 11pts
- 1964 - (Sweden) Gothenburg, Ullevi - 4th - 11pts

=== World Team Cup ===
- 1964 - (West Germany) Abensberg, Abensberg Stadion (with Igor Plekhanov / Gennady Kurilenko / Yuri Chekranov) - 2nd - 25pts (3)
- 1966 - (Poland) Wrocław, Olympic Stadium (with Viktor Trofimov / Igor Plekhanov / Farid Szajnurov) - 2nd - 25pts (10)
- 1967 - (Sweden) Malmö, Malmö Stadion (with Igor Plekhanov / Gabdrakhman Kadyrov / Viktor Trofimov / Farid Szajnurov) - 3rd= - 19pts (3)
