= Antonín Šváb =

Antonín Šváb may refer to:

- Antonín Šváb Sr. (1932–2014), Czech speedway rider
- Antonín Šváb Jr. (born 1974), Czech speedway rider
