= 1970 Individual Ice Speedway World Championship =

Seasons
- ← 1969 1971 →

The 1970 Individual Ice Speedway World Championship was the fifth edition of the World Championship.

The winner was Antonín Šváb Sr. of the Czechoslovakia.

== Final ==
- March 8
- SWE Nassjo

Pos.	Rider	Points	Details
1	(Czechoslovakia) Antonín Šváb Sr.	15	
2	(Soviet Union) Gabdrakhman Kadyrov	14	
3	(Sweden) Kurt Westlund	12+3	
4	(Sweden) Conny Samuelsson	12+2	
5	(Soviet Union) Valery Katyuzhansky	9	
6	(Soviet Union) Yury Dubinin	9	
7	(Scotland) Andy Ross	9	
8	(Soviet Union) Jury Lombockiy	8	
9	(Sweden) Hans Juhansson	6	
10	(Czechoslovakia) Jaroslav Machač	6	
11	(West Germany) Hans Siegl	6	
12	(Bulgaria) Petar Petkov	5	
13	(Sweden) Yngve Nilsson	4	
14	(Czechoslovakia) Antonín Kasper Sr.	3	
15	(Czechoslovakia) Stanislav Kubíček	1	
16	(Finland) Esko Koponen	1	
R1	(Sweden) Olle Ahnström	0	
