= 1968 Individual Ice Speedway World Championship =

Motorcycle ice speedway race

Seasons
- ← 1967 1969 →

The 1968 Individual Ice Speedway World Championship was the third edition of the World Championship.

The winner was Gabdrakhman Kadyrov of the Soviet Union for the second time.

== Final ==
- (Soviet Union) Stroitel Stadium, Salavat, 20–21 February
- (Soviet Union) Stroitel Stadium, Ufa, 24–25 February

Pos.	Rider	Points	Details
1	(Soviet Union) Gabdrakhman Kadyrov	54	
2	(Soviet Union) Vladimir Tsybrov	52	
3	(Soviet Union) Boris Samorodov	51	
4	(Soviet Union) Yury Dudorin	48	
5	(Czechoslovakia) Antonín Šváb Sr.	44	
6	(East Germany) Hans Jürgen Fritz	35	
7	(Czechoslovakia) Antonín Kasper Sr.	33	
8	(Sweden) Kurt Westlund	36	
9	(East Germany) Peter Liebing	25	
10	(Bulgaria) Stojan Hristov	18	
11	(West Germany) Peter Knott	18	
12	(Mongolia) Jalbugiin Serjbudee	17	
13	(Sweden) Yngve Nilsson	15	
14	(Czechoslovakia) Stanislav Kubíček	13	
15	(Finland) Esko Koponen	10	
16	(Finland) Reimo Lohkovuori	6	
R1	(Finland) Juhani Taipale	2	
