= 1966 Individual Ice Speedway World Championship =

World ice speedway event

Seasons
- ← none 1967 →

The 1966 Individual Ice Speedway World Championship was the first edition of the World Championship.

The winner was Gabdrakhman Kadyrov of the Soviet Union. Kadyrov had previously won the 1964 European Ice Speedway Championship, the predecessor to this competition.

== Final ==
- (Soviet Union) Stroitel Stadium, Ufa, February 19–20
- (Soviet Union) Lenin Stadium, Moscow, February 24–25

Pos.	Rider	Points
1	(Soviet Union) Gabdrakhman Kadyrov	43
2	(Soviet Union) Viktor Kuznetsov	39
3	(Czechoslovakia) Antonín Šváb Sr.	39
4	(Soviet Union) Yuri Chekranov	35
5	(Soviet Union) Boris Samorodov	35
6	(Soviet Union) Yury Dudorin	34
7	(Czechoslovakia) Antonín Kasper Sr.	30
8	(Czechoslovakia) Stanislav Kubíček	27
9	(Sweden) Kurt Westlund	23
10	(East Germany) Peter Liebing	21
11	(Finland) Jukko Naskali	18
12	(Austria) Helmut Walch	14
13	(West Germany) Peter Knott	10
14	(Poland) Mieczysław Połukard	9
15	(Sweden) Leif Enecrona	7
16	(Socialist Federal Republic of Yugoslavia) Drasko Perko	6
R	(Finland) Matti Koivula	6
