= NVent Schroff =

German electronic cabinet manufacturer

nVent Schroff GmbH
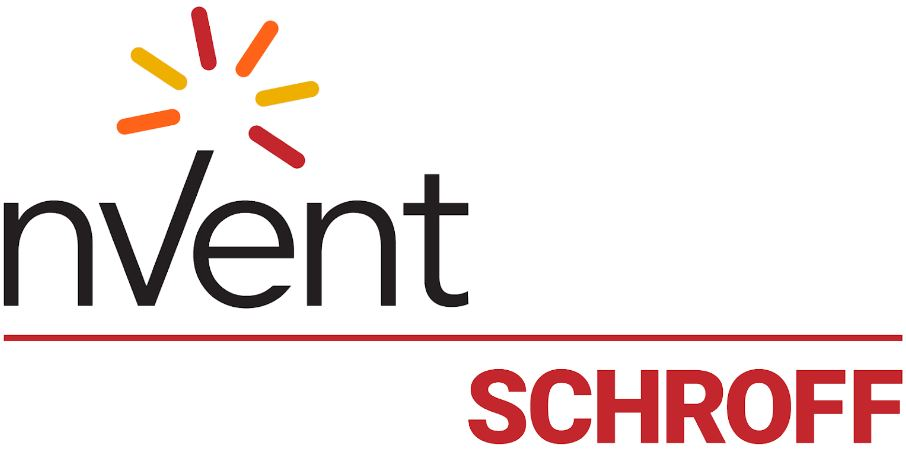
- Type: Gesellschaft mit beschränkter Haftung (GmbH) Subsidiary
- Industry: Electronic housing
- Founded: 1962; 64 years ago
- Founder: Gunther Schroff
- Headquarters: Straubenhardt, (BW), Germany
- Area served: Worldwide
- Key people: Mustafa Karabuz, Volker Haag
- Products: Electrical cabinets, housings, chassis and related components
- Number of employees: 650 (2018)
- Parent: nVent Electric (nVent)
- Website: schroff.nvent.com

Schroff is a German manufacturer of electrical and electronic cabinets, housings devices and associated components. Its products include cabinets, housings, chassis and related components for multiple markets such as telecommunications, data centers and traffic management.

Schroff was founded in 1962 and is headquartered in Straubenhardt near Pforzheim. It has been part of the American-British company nVent Electric (nVent) since 2018 after its previous owner Pentair was split into two companies. nVent employs 11,000 people worldwide, of which about 1,500 are part of the Schroff brand.

The company operates in accordance with the ISO 9001 standards and is certified to OHSAS 18001. and ISO 14001 Schroff is one of the largest employers in the Karlsruhe/Pforzheim region.

== History ==
Schroff was founded in 1962 by Gunther Schroff. In the early years Schroff only manufactured power supplies.

By the mid-1960s the Schroff Europac Rack was the main product of the 19 inch division. Rapid acceptance of Schroff electronic housing products in the major electronics markets of the U.S. and Japan made Schroff the standard for electronic design.

Through its participation in international standardization groups such as the IEC, Schroff pioneer of 19-inch racks, and also for the standard dimensions of the rack unit (RU) and division unit (TE).

Schroff was part of British conglomerate Pentair from 1994 until 2018. On April 30, 2018 Pentair split into two companies, and Schroff became part of the British nVent electric company.

== Locations ==
The main work of the Straubenhardt facility is administration, development, metal processing, special tool manufacture, painting, plating, the manufacture and assembly of electronics components.

In addition to production in Straubenhardt, Schroff has other production facilities in France and Poland as well as sales and integration centers worldwide.

=== Production ===
Company	Location	Number of employees	Production Area
Schroff GmbH	Straubenhardt, Germany	ca. 800	49.000 m²
Schroff SAS	Betschdorf, France	ca. 320	20.000 m²
Pentair Poland Sp. z o.o.	Dzierżoniów, Poland	ca. 96	9.500 m²

As of June 2018

=== Sales and Integration Centers ===
- Schroff UK Ltd. in England
- Schroff Scandinavia AB in Sweden and Finland
- Schroff S.R.L. in Italy
- Schroff GmbH/S.p.z.o.o. in Warsaw, Poland
- Hoffman Schroff Pte. Ltd. in Singapore
- Schroff K.K. in Yokohama, Japan.

Other manufacturing and solution centers owned by Pentair in the United States, Mexico, Brazil, China, India and Poland.

== Products ==
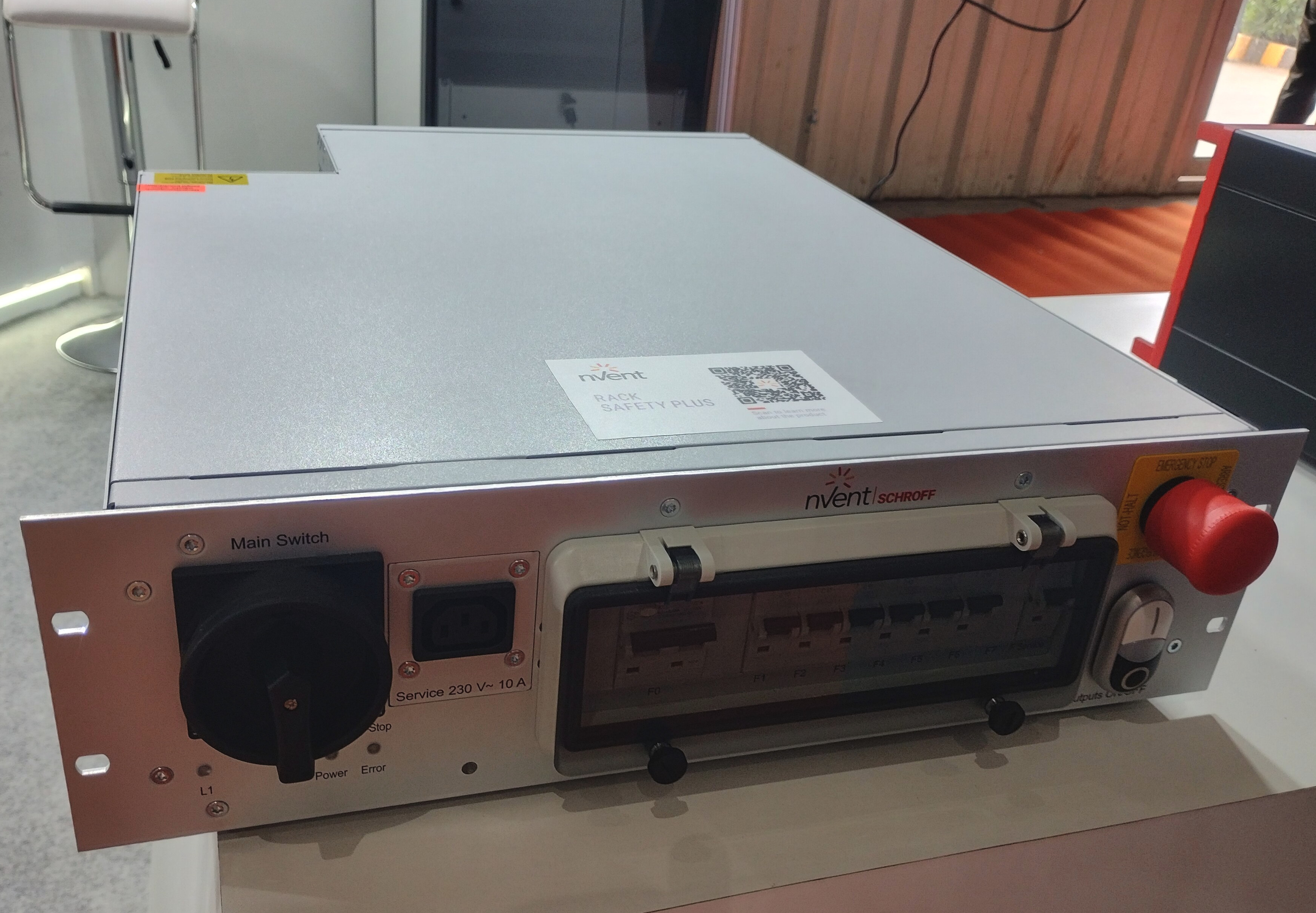
A NVent Schroff product: Rack Safety Plus, in Electronica 2025, BIEC

Schroff, creates cabinets, cases and racks for industries including telecommunications, data and network technology, defense technology, aviation, railway, and traffic technology. Products include:

- Industrial, electronic, networking, and server cabinets for indoor and outdoor applications
- 19" table and tower cases, 19" racks, and enclosures, wall cases
- Front panels, plug-in modules, subracks and printed circuit boards
- Power supplies for measurement and control technology
- Climate control such as 19" fan trays, 19" blowers, filtered fans, heaters, heat exchangers, cooling devices
- Racks and systems such as AdvancedTCA, AdvancedMC, MicroTCA, CompactPCI, VMEbus, VME64x bus and disk drive units
- Backplanes, test adapters, and power strips for electronics industry

== See also ==
- Electrical enclosure
- NVent Hoffman
- Pentair
