= 1972 Individual Ice Speedway World Championship =

Motorcycle ice speedway race

Seasons
- ← 1971 1973 →

The 1972 Individual Ice Speedway World Championship was the seventh edition of the World Championship.

The winner was Gabdrakhman Kadyrov of the Soviet Union for the fifth time.

== Final ==
- March 5
- SWE Nassjo

Pos.	Rider	Points	Details
1	(Soviet Union) Gabdrakhman Kadyrov	15	
2	(Czechoslovakia) Antonín Šváb Sr.	14	
3	(Soviet Union) Vladimir Paznikov	12+3	
4	(Sweden) Bernt Harrfeldt	12+2	
5	(Soviet Union) Konstantin Demakhin	11	
6	(Soviet Union) Yury Dudorin	8	
7	(Soviet Union) Vladimir Tsybrov	7	
8	(Sweden) Kurt Westlund	6	
9	(Sweden) Hans Johansson	6	
10	(Soviet Union) Yury Dubinin	6	
11	(Sweden) Karl-Evar Vattmann	5	
12	(Soviet Union) Vladimir Chekushev	5	
13	(Sweden) Conny Samuelsson	5	
14	(Czechoslovakia) Jan Verner	4	
15	(Sweden) Sven Sigurd	3	
16	(Sweden) Per Lennart Eriksson	1	
