= Andy Ross (speedway rider) =

British speedway rider

- Born: 3 April 1940; Scotland
- Died: 3 September 2006 (aged 66)
- Nationality: British (Scottish)

Career history
- 1969: Rayleigh Rockets
- 1970, 1971: Peterborough Panthers
- 1970: Oxford Cheetahs

Individual honours
- 1969, 1970: Ice Speedway World finalist

Andrew Ross (3 April 1940 – 3 September 2006) was an international speedway rider from Scotland.

== Speedway career ==
Ross was a finalist at the Individual Ice Speedway World Championship in the 1969 Individual Ice Speedway World Championship and the 1970 Individual Ice Speedway World Championship. He was also a prominent grasstrack rider and won the British title in 1968.

Ross rode in the British League of British Speedway from 1969 to 1971 and was the first captain of the Peterborough Panthers.

Ross died in a shooting accident in Scotland on 3 September 2006.

== World final appearances ==
=== Individual Ice Speedway World Championship ===
- 1969 - (West Germany) Inzell, 11th - 5pts
- 1970 - (Sweden) Nässjö, 7th - 9pts
