= Nässjö IF =

- City: Nässjö, Sweden
- League: Allsvenskan
- Founded: 22 November 1899; 125 years ago
- Home arena: Stinsen Arena

Nässjö IF, full name Nässjö Idrottsförening, is a sports club in Nässjö, Sweden, mostly active with playing bandy. The club colours are blue and yellow, but the team uniforms are often in blue and white. The club was founded in 1899. The club is playing the home games at Stinsen Arena, which is named for Lennart "Stinsen" Israelsson, who donated 1 million SEK to the project.

The club has played in the second level bandy league in Sweden, Allsvenskan, since the start of the present Allsvenskan in 2007. In 1949, the club won the Swedish Championship of bandy.

== History ==
In the first year of bandy league system in Sweden, 1930–31, Nässjö entered in Division 1 Södra together with Djurgårdens IF, IF Göta, IFK Strängnäs, IFK Uppsala, IK Göta, Linköpings AIK, and Örebro SK and finished 4th.

== Honours ==
=== Domestic ===
- Swedish Champions:
  - Winners (1): 1949
  - Runners-up (2): 1939, 1953
