= 1967 Individual Ice Speedway World Championship =

World ice speedway event

Seasons
- ← 1966 1968 →

The 1967 Individual Ice Speedway World Championship was the second edition of the World Championship.

The winner was Boris Samorodov of the Soviet Union. Samorodov had previously won the 1965 European Ice Speedway Championship, the predecessor to this competition.

== Final ==
- (Soviet Union) Stroitel Stadium, Ufa, 25–26 February
- (Soviet Union) Lenin Stadium, Moscow, 1 March
- (Soviet Union) Leningrad Speedway Stadium, Leningrad, 3 March

Pos.	Rider	Points
1	(Soviet Union) Boris Samorodov	57
2	(Soviet Union) Vyacheslav Dubinin	50
3	(Soviet Union) Vladimir Tsybrov	41
4	(Czechoslovakia) Antonín Šváb Sr.	43
5	(Soviet Union) Gabdrakhman Kadyrov	39
6	(Soviet Union) Vsevolod Nerytov	41
7	(Poland) Norbert Świtała	32
8	(Sweden) Kurt Westlund	32
9	(Czechoslovakia) Pavel Mareš	31
10	(Czechoslovakia) Stanislav Kubíček	30
11	(Socialist Federal Republic of Yugoslavia) Draško Perko	26
12	(West Germany) Peter Knott	20
13	(East Germany) Hans Jürgen Fritz	10
14	(Austria) Helmut Walch	9
15	(Sweden) Olle Ahnström	7
16	(Sweden) Jan Ekeroth	7
R1	(Sweden) Leif Enecrona	1
R2	(East Germany) Eberhard Kammler	0
