= Gabdrakhman Kadyrov =

Soviet speedway rider

- Born: 27 January 1941; Shatura, Moscow Oblast, Soviet Union
- Died: 31 July 1993 (aged 52); Sochi, Russia

Career history
- 1967-69: Bashkortostan

Individual honours
- 1966, 1968, 1969, 1971, 1972, 1973: Ice World Champion

Team honours
- 1967: Speedway World Team Cup bronze medal

Gabdrakhman Kadyrov (27 January 1941 - 31 July 1993) was an international speedway rider from the Soviet Union. His nationality was described as being a Tatar and his mother came from Bashkortostan but he was born in Shatura.

== Speedway career ==
Kadyrov was one of the all-time great Ice Speedway riders. He won the inaugural Individual Ice Speedway World Championship in 1966, and went on to be the champion of the world six times in total, after winning again in 1966, 1968, 1969, 1971, 1972 and 1973.

Kadyrov won a silver medal at the Speedway World Team Cup in the 1967 Speedway World Team Cup. He was known as Gab and earned the nickname 'The Beatle' by his fellow Soviet riders because of his hair cut resembling The Beatles at the time. He was a metal craftsman by trade. In 1964, he was part of the Soviet Union team that toured Britain for the first time. In 1965, he toured the United Kingdom as part of the Soviet Union national team again.

== World final appearances ==
=== Individual Ice World Championship ===
- 1966 - (Soviet Union) 2 rounds - 1st - 43pts
- 1967 - (Soviet Union) 3 rounds - 5th - 39pts
- 1968 - (Soviet Union) 2 rounds - 1st - 54pts
- 1969 - (West Germany) Inzell - 1st - 14pts
- 1970 - (Sweden) Nässjö - 2nd - 14pts
- 1971 - (West Germany) Inzell - 1st - 29pts
- 1972 - (Sweden) Nässjö - 1st - 15pts
- 1973 - (West Germany) Inzell - 1st - 29pts
- 1974 - (Sweden) Nässjö - 3rd - 13pts

=== World Team Cup ===
- 1967 - (Sweden) Malmö, Malmö Stadion (with Igor Plekhanov / Boris Samorodov / Viktor Trofimov / Farid Szajnurov) - 3rd= - 19pts (2)
