= 1969 Individual Ice Speedway World Championship =

Championship motorcycle racing on ice

Seasons
- ← 1968 1970 →

The 1969 Individual Ice Speedway World Championship was the fourth edition of the World Championship.

The winner was Gabdrakhman Kadyrov of the Soviet Union for the third time.

== Final ==
- March 9
- FRG Inzell

Pos.	Rider	Points	Details
1	(Soviet Union) Gabdrakhman Kadyrov	14	
2	(Soviet Union) Yury Lombockiy	13	
3	(Soviet Union) Vladimir Tsybrov	12+3	
4	(Czechoslovakia) Antonín Šváb Sr.	12+F	
5	(Soviet Union) Boris Samorodov	10	
6	(Czechoslovakia) Antonín Kasper Sr.	9	
7	(Czechoslovakia) Jaroslav Machač	8	
8	(Sweden) Kurt Westlund	8	
9	(Sweden) Yngve Nilsson	7	
10	(West Germany) Peter Knott	5	
11	(Scotland) Andy Ross	5	
12	(Sweden) Sven Rendlund	4	
13	(West Germany) Josef Aigner	3	
R1	(Sweden) Conny Samuelsson	7	
R2	(Sweden) Olle Ahnström	2	
R3	(Sweden) Krister Ajnhorm	1	
R4	(East Germany) Fred Aberl	0	
