= IFK Strängnäs =

Swedish sports club

- Full name: Idrottsföreningen kamraterna Strängnäs
- Sport: track and field athletics, handball, orienteering bandy, parasports (earlier)
- Founded: 1899
- Based in: Strängnäs, Sweden

IFK Strängnäs is a sports club in Strängnäs, Sweden, established in 1899. The club runs track and field athletics, handball, disabled sports, orienteering, earlier even bandy. The men's bandy team played in the Swedish top division in 1931 and 1932.

== History ==
In the first year of bandy league system in Sweden, 1930–31, IFK Strängnäs entered in Division 1 Södra together with Djurgårdens IF, IF Göta, IFK Uppsala, IK Göta, Linköpings AIK, Nässjö IF, and Örebro SK and finished 6th.
