= Jürgen Hehlert =

East German speedway rider

- Born: 15 April 1941 (age 85); Rostock, Germany
- Nationality: German

Career history

East Germany
- 1967: Güstrow

West Germany
- ?: Rodenbach
- 1980: Cloppenburg

Great Britain
- 1974: Hull Vikings

Individual honours
- 1962, 1966: East German Champion

Jürgen Hehlert (born 15 April 1941) is a former international motorcycle speedway rider from East Germany. He earned international caps for both the East Germany national speedway team and later the West Germany national speedway team, after he defected.

== Speedway career ==
Hehlert was a two times champion of East Germany, winning the East German Championship in 1962 (which was the first post-World War II) German championship) and again in 1966.

Hehlert only rode one season in the United Kingdom, riding for Hull Vikings, during the 1974 British League Division Two season. He was released by Hull to be replaced by German rider Josef Angermüller.

Hehlert was credited with being partly responsible for the renovation of the track at the Günter Harder Stadion and in 1970 and reached the Continental final of the 1970 Speedway World Team Cup with the East Germany national speedway team after winning both the quarter final and semi final.

In 1972, Hehlert defected from the East to the West, settling in Hanau in Hesse and later rode for MSC Rodenbach in the German Team Speedway Championship He would also represent the West German national team.
