= NVent Hoffman =

Industrial enclosure manufacturing company

nVent Hoffman
- Formerly: Eldon Enclosures
- Type: Subsidiary
- Industry: Electrical enclosures
- Founded: 1922; 104 years ago
- Fate: Acquired
- Successor: nVent Electric
- Products: Enclosure systems, terminal boxes, human-machine interface, thermal management
- Parent: nVent Electric
- Website: www.nvent.com/hoffman

nVent Hoffman, previously known as Eldon Enclosures, is an industrial enclosure manufacturing company that has been a subsidiary of nVent Electric since 2019. It manufactures and distributes enclosure systems and thermal management for electronic systems such as in data centers.

== History ==
Pre-2019 Eldon logo.

Pre-2019 headquarters in Madrid, Spain.

Founded in 1922 in Nässjö, Sweden, the original company, was called Elekto Ljus & Kraft, the name changed to AB Eldon-Verken in 1948. Eldon is a portmanteau of the Swedish words el (electrical) and don (device).

Initially building electrical installation equipment and selling radios, the latest invention at the time, they soon began manufacturing a junction box designed for the use with electric ovens.

In 1963, the first acquisition was made with the take-over of their biggest competitor, Elektriska Osterman AB. Four years later, the Eldon-Osterman companies have merged under the common name of Eldon AB.

In 1967, the company expanded abroad, by opening sales offices in several European Countries, starting with the UK and Belgium.

The Dutch subsidiary was inaugurated in 1970 in the north of the Netherlands, in Drachten.

In 1999, Eldon AB was sold to EQT AB and in 2006, the new management team acquired the majority shareholding from EQT.

In July 2019, Eldon Enclosures was acquired by nVent Electric for $130 million in cash, and renamed to nVent Hoffman.

Prior to the nVent acquisition, Eldon Enclosures was headquartered in Madrid, Spain. Product manufacturing was developed in several European production facilities and a plant in Umargam, India. The company had 6 distribution centers and was present in 45 countries.

== Products ==
nVent HOFFMAN offers several ranges of products:

- Floor Standing Enclosures
- Wall Mounted Enclosures
- Terminal Boxes
- Human Machine Interface
- Thermal Management
- Cable Management
- General Accessories
- Power Distribution
- Panel Shop Automation

== See also ==
- NVent Schroff
- Pentair
