= Leif Enecrona =

Swedish speedway rider

- Born: 5 March 1940; Stockholm, Sweden
- Died: 11 April 2003 (aged 63)
- Nationality: Swedish

Career history

Sweden
- 1961-1966: Gamarna
- 1967-1978: Getingarna

Great Britain
- 1966: Long Eaton Archers

Individual honours
- 1968: Swedish Champion
- 1968: Golden Helmet of Pardubice

Team honours
- 1967, 1969, 1974, 1978: Allsvenskan Champion
- 1965: Allsvenskan Div 2 Champion
- 1962: Allsvenskan Div 3 Champion

Leif Enecrona (5 March 1940 – 11 April 2003) is a former international motorcycle speedway rider who reached the finals of the Speedway World Championship three times. He earned 16 caps for the Sweden national speedway team.

== Career ==
Enecrona rode for Gamarna from 1961 to 1966, winning the Allsvenskan Division 2 in 1965 and then for Getingarna from 1967 to 1978 winning the Allsvenskan four times. Enecrona had a brief spell in the United Kingdom, riding for the Long Eaton Archers during the 1966 British League season, where he averaged 7.68.

Enecrona won the Swedish Championship in 1968.

== World Final appearances ==
=== Individual World Championship ===
- 1966 - (Sweden) Gothenburg, Ullevi - 7th - 8pts
- 1967 - (England) London, Wembley Stadium - Reserve - did not ride
- 1971 - (Sweden) Göteborg, Ullevi - 12th - 4pts

=== World Team Cup ===
- 1966 - (Poland) Wrocław, Olympic Stadium (with Björn Knutson / Ove Fundin / Göte Nordin / Leif Larsson) - 3rd - 22pts (4)
- 1971 - (Poland) Wrocław, Olympic Stadium (with Anders Michanek / Bernt Persson / Sören Sjösten / Bengt Jansson) - 4th - 18pts (3)

=== Individual Ice Speedway World Championship ===
- 1966 - (Soviet Union) Ufa/Moscow - 15th - 7pts
- 1967 - (Soviet Union) Ufa/Moscow/Leningrad - Reserve - 1pt
