= Stinsen Arena =

Indoor bandy venue in Nässjö, Sweden

Coordinates: 57.6406°N 14.6801°E

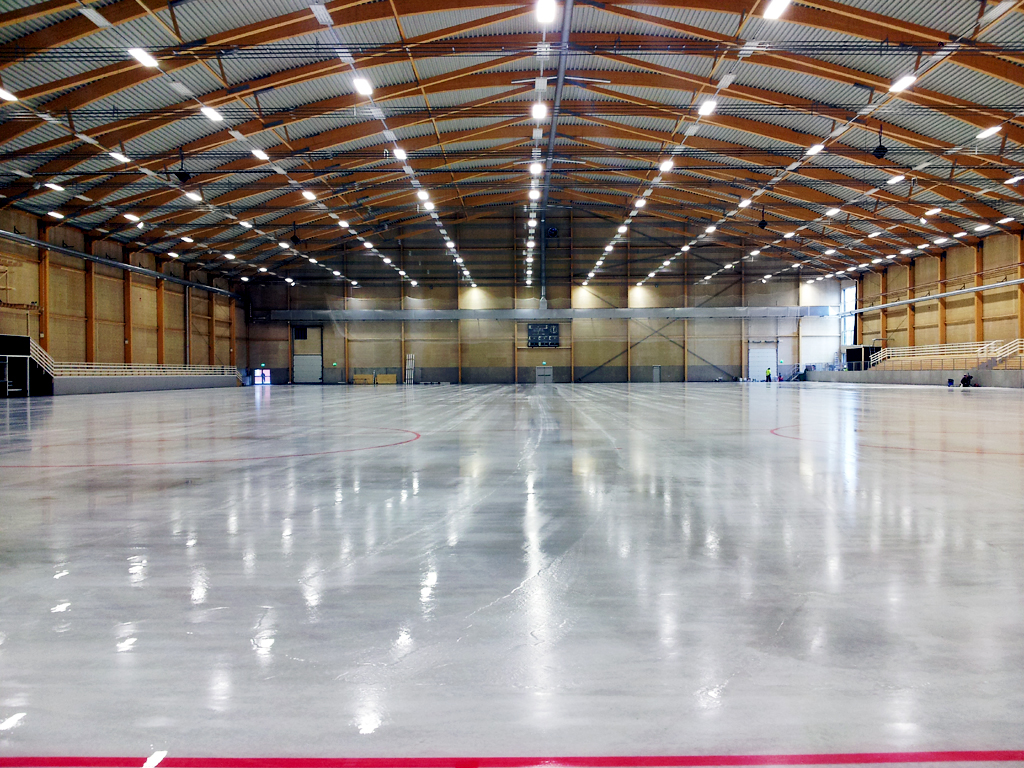
- Interactive map of Stinsen Arena
- Location: Nässjö, Sweden
- Owner: Nässjö Municipality
- Capacity: 2 000 (bandy games); 4 500 (concert)
- Type: indoor bandy venue

Construction
- Opened: 6 October 2012

Tenants
- Nässjö IF; Malmbäcks IF

Stinsen Arena is an indoor bandy venue in Nässjö, Sweden. Construction began on 27 April 2012, and the arena was opened on 6 October 2012.

The first game inside the arena was played on 11 October 2012 when Nässjö IF lost, 2–7, to Vetlanda BK.
