= NVent Electric =

British multinational electrical equipment company

nVent Electric plc
- Type: Public
- Traded as: NYSE: NVT; S&P 400 component
- Industry: Electrical equipment
- Predecessor: Pentair
- Founded: May 1, 2018; 8 years ago
- Headquarters: London, United Kingdom; Minneapolis, Minnesota, U.S.
- Key people: Beth A. Wozniak (CEO)
- Products: Electrical connection and protection systems
- Brands: CADDY, ERICO, HOFFMAN, ILSCO, SCHROFF, TRACER
- Revenue: ▲US$3.89 billion (2025)
- Net income: ▲US$710 million (2025)
- Number of employees: 11,000 (2025)
- Subsidiaries: NVent Hoffman; NVent Schroff
- Website: nvent.com

NVent Electric plc (stylized as nVent) is an American-British multinational company providing electrical connection and enclosure products. The company designs, manufactures, markets, and services products used to connect, protect, and manage electrical systems in commercial, industrial, residential, infrastructure, and data center applications.

NVent is headquartered in London, with its United States operational office headquartered in Minneapolis, Minnesota, United States.

== History ==
nVent was established when Pentair separated its electrical business in 2018, creating nVent Electric plc as an independent, publicly traded entity. nVent began trading on the New York Stock Exchange on May 1, 2018, under the ticker symbol NVT.

Following the spin-off, nVent pursued a strategy of targeted acquisitions and portfolio reshaping. In 2019, it acquired Eldon Enclosures, a Swedish manufacturer of electrical enclosures, expanding its product portfolio and distribution network across EMEA.

In August 2024, nVent announced an agreement to sell its thermal management business, including the Raychem and Tracer brands, to funds managed by Brookfield Asset Management for approximately US$1.7 billion, as part of its strategy to focus on core electrical connection and protection offerings.

In March 2025, nVent announced the acquisition of the Electrical Products Group business of Avail Infrastructure Solutions for approximately US$975 million, adding switchgear, bus systems, and control building products. The transaction was completed in May 2025.

In October of 2026, nVent acquired Maverick Power. Maverick Power is a leading manufacturer of engineered power distribution and infrastructure solutions for data centers.

== Operations ==
nVent operates primarily through two major business segments:

- Electrical and Fastening products – including CADDY, ERICO, and ILSCO brands, which offer electrical connectors, grounding and bonding systems, and mechanical fastening products.
- Enclosures and Protection products – under brands such as HOFFMAN and SCHROFF, offering electrical enclosures, cabinets, and related thermal and safety solutions.

The company serves customers across multiple sectors, including industrial automation, data centers, power utilities, renewable energy, telecommunications, and commercial construction. nVent has manufacturing and sales operations in over 30 countries, including facilities in the United States, Germany, the Netherlands, and China.

== See also ==
- Electrical enclosure
- Heat tracing
