= Hans Jürgen Fritz =

German speedway rider

- Born: 2 June 1941; Nazi Germany
- Died: 24 August 1996 (aged 55)
- Nationality: German

Career history

East Germany
- 1964–1966: Neubrandenburg
- 1967–1974: Güstrow

Individual honours
- 1970, 1971, 1972: East German champion
- 1970: Continental Champion
- 1970: Speedway World Championship finalist

Team honours
- 1968, 1972, 1973, 1974: East German league champion

Hans Jürgen Fritz (2 June 1941 – 24 August 1996) was an international speedway rider from East Germany.

== Speedway career ==
Fritz reached the final of the Speedway World Championship in the 1970 Individual Speedway World Championship.

Fritz was three times champion of East Germany after winning the German Individual Speedway Championship in 1970, 1971 and 1972.

Fritz rode for MC Neubrandenburg and MC Güstrow, winning the East German Team Speedway Championship with the latter, four times in 1968, 1972, 1973 and 1974.

== World final appearances ==
=== Individual World Championship ===
- 1970 – (Poland) Wrocław, Olympic Stadium – 12th – 5pts

=== Individual Ice Speedway World Championship ===
- 1967 - (Soviet Union) 3 rounds, 13th - 10pts
- 1968 - (Soviet Union) 2 rounds, 6th - 35pts
