= 1971 Individual Ice Speedway World Championship =

Motorcycle ice speedway race

Seasons
- ← 1970 1972 →

The 1971 Individual Ice Speedway World Championship was the sixth edition of the World Championship.

The winner was Gabdrakhman Kadyrov of the Soviet Union for the fourth time.

== Final ==
- March 6–7
- FRG Inzell

Pos.	Rider	Points	Details
1	(Soviet Union) Gabdrakhman Kadyrov	29	
2	(Soviet Union) Vladimir Chekushev	25	
3	(Czechoslovakia) Milan Špinka	21	
4	(Soviet Union) Valery Katyuzhansky	18	
5	(Soviet Union) Vladimir Tsybrov	18	
6	(Soviet Union) Yury Dudorin	18	
7	(Sweden) Sven Sigurd	18	
8	(Sweden) Kurt Westlund	18	
9	(Sweden) Conny Samuelsson	16	
10	(Sweden) Bernt Harrfeldt	13	
11	(Soviet Union) Aleksandr Shcherbakov	12	
12	(Sweden) Hasse Holmqvist	11	
13	(West Germany) Hans Siegl	9	
14	(West Germany) Christoph Betzl	4	
15	(Sweden) Tommy Johansson	4	
16	(Czechoslovakia) Václav Verner	3	
R1	(West Germany) Alfred Döhr	1	
R2	(East Germany) Otto Barth	1	
