= Antonín Šváb Sr. =

Czech speedway rider

- Born: 12 June 1932; Czechoslovakia
- Died: 21 November 2014 (aged 82)
- Nationality: Czech

Career history

Czechoslovakia
- 1960: Ústí nad Labem
- 1968–1971: Rudá Hvězda Praha

Individual honours
- 1970: Ice Speedway World Champion
- 1972: Ice Speedway silver medal
- 1966: Ice Speedway bronze medal
- 1968, 1972: European Longtrack finalist

Antonín Šváb Sr. (12 June 1932 – 21 November 2014) was a Czech international speedway rider, representing Czechoslovakia.

== Speedway career ==
Antonín Šváb Sr. was an Individual Ice Speedway World Championship world champion winning the 1970 Individual Ice Speedway World Championship.

Like many Czech riders of the time, the Czechoslovak authorities rarely allowed riders to compete for British league teams but they did allow club sides such as Prague to tour the United Kingdom, which allowed Šváb to race in Britain in 1967. In 1968 he returned to tour Britain, where he starred alongside Antonín Kasper Sr.

Šváb died in 2014.

== World final appearances ==
=== Individual Ice World Championship ===
- 1966 - (Soviet Union) 2 rounds - 3rd - 39pts
- 1967 - (Soviet Union) 3 rounds - 4th - 43pts
- 1968 - (Soviet Union) 2 rounds - 5th - 44pts
- 1969 - (West Germany) Inzell - 4th - 12pts
- 1970 - (Sweden) Nässjö - 1st - 15pts
- 1972 - (Sweden) Nässjö - 2nd - 14pts
- 1973 - (West Germany) Inzell - 10th - 13pts

== World Longtrack Championship ==
- 1968 (West Germany) Mühldorf (7th) 10pts
- 1972 (West Germany) Mühldorf (6th) 14pts

== Family ==
Šváb's son Antonín Jr. was also an international speedway rider.
