= Straubenhardt =

- Municipality
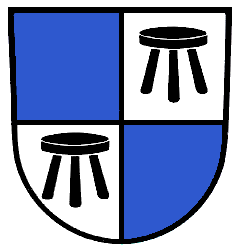
- Coat of arms

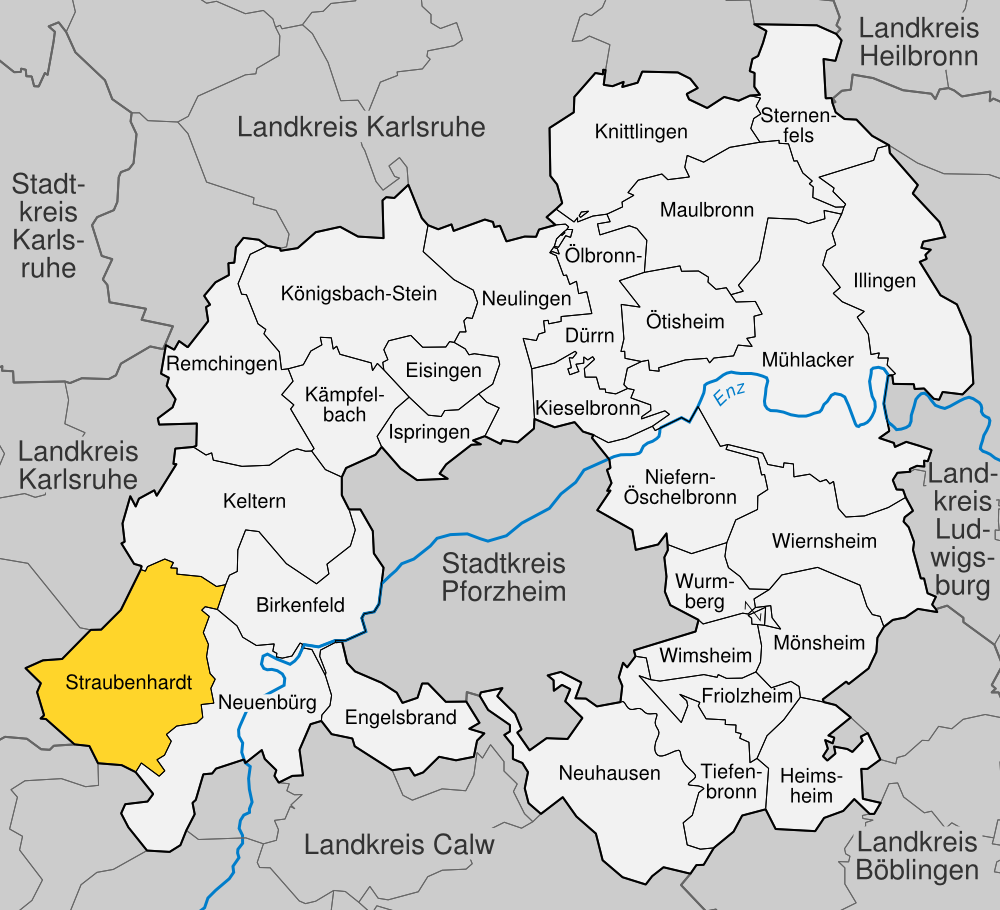
- Location of Straubenhardt within Enzkreis district
- Interactive map of Straubenhardt
- Location within Germany Location within Baden-Württemberg
- Coordinates: 48°50′43″N 8°32′45″E
- Country: Germany
- State: Baden-Württemberg
- Admin. region: Karlsruhe
- District: Enzkreis
- Subdivisions: 6

Government
  - Mayor (2021–29): Helge Viehweg (SPD)

Area
  - Total: 33.08 km^{2} (12.77 sq mi)
- Elevation: 438 m (1,437 ft)

Population (2025-12-31)
  - Total: 11,317
  - Density: 342.1/km^{2} (886.1/sq mi)
- Time zone: UTC+01:00 (CET)
  - Summer (DST): UTC+02:00 (CEST)
- Postal codes: 75334
- Dialling codes: 07082, 07248 (Langenalb)
- Vehicle registration: PF
- Website: www.straubenhardt.de

Straubenhardt (German pronunciation: [ˈʃtʁaʊbn̩haʁt]) is a municipality in the Enz district, in Baden-Württemberg, Germany. It is situated 21 km southeast of Karlsruhe, and 14 km west of Pforzheim.

== Municipality arrangement ==
The municipality Straubenhardt consists of the former municipalities Conweiler, Feldrennach, Langenalb, Ottenhausen and Schwann. Conweiler, Feldrennach, Ottenhausen and Schwann were part of Württemberg, while Langenalb was part of Baden. Only the respective villages belonged to the former municipalities Conweiler and Schwann. The former municipality Feldrennach consisted of the villages Feldrennach and Pfinzweiler as well as the houses Hasenstock-Sägmühle. The former municipality Langenalb was composed of the village Langenalb and the houses Bitzenhühlersägmühle, Brücklessägmühle, Dampfsägmühle, the dwellings Feldrennachersägmühle, Heinzensägmühle as well as Maisenmühle. The municipality Ottenhausen was formed by the village Ottenhausen, the weekend community Hardthof and the houses Hochmühle.

Despite initial plans to also incorporate the village Dennach, on whose premises the name-giving fortress Straubenhardt was located, these plans were scrapped last minute and Dennach was awarded to Neuenbürg.

Ottenhausen absorbed the hamlet Rudmersbach which was mentioned initially in 1292 as 'Rutmerspach'

== History ==
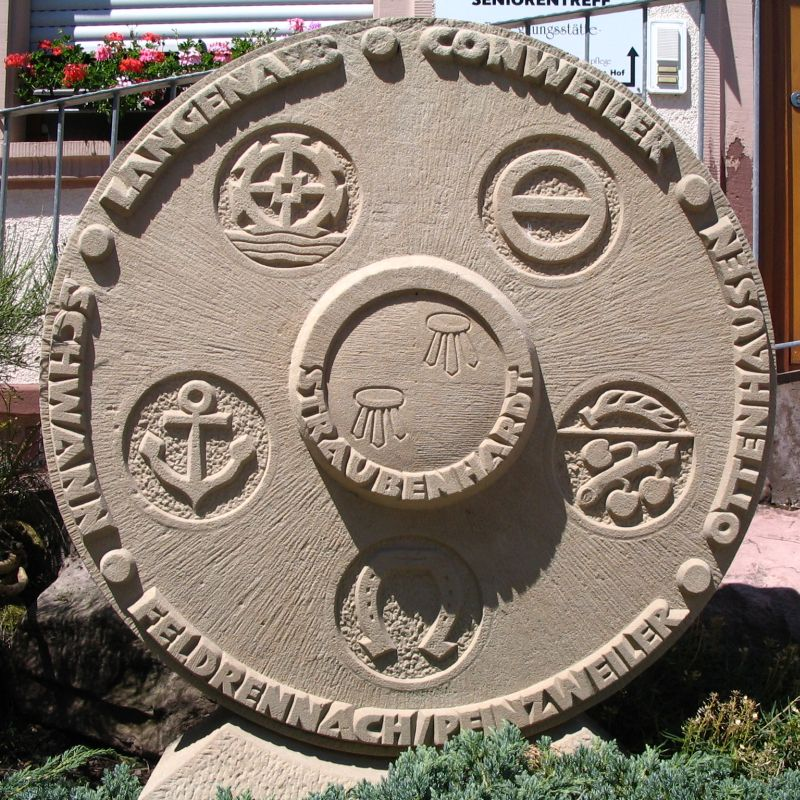
Stone with coat of arms for all subdivisions

Around the year 1000 the Counts of Calw had a fortress built near today's village of Neuenbürg-Dennach. The fortress was called Straubenhardt after the inhospitable area (Alemannic: "Struben Hardt" - rough forest). The castellan soon took on the name of the fortress. Starting 1320 the castle and its surrounding areas came increasingly under the domination of the House of Württemberg. The Schmalensteiners who were related by marriage to the Lords of Straubenhardt and who also lived at the fortress, therefore joined a Federation of the Knights under the leadership of Wolf von Eberstein. In 1367 the Federation of the Knights committed an assault on Count Eberhard II of Württemberg while he was staying in Wildbad. It is not clear whether this happened at the present Bad Wildbad or at Bad Teinach. However, the description of his escape route indicated that it indeed happened at today's Bad Wildbad. The Count was able to flee to the fortress Zavelstein. In retaliation, and due to further differences, Count Eberhard II occupied the fortress Straubenhardt sometime between 1374 and 1381 and had it destroyed. After the destruction of their fortress the nobles of Straubenhardt moved their residence to Schwann and built a castle there. Schwann was the center of an administrative district and jurisdiction of the nobles of Straubenhardt and the family of Schmalenstein. The family Straubenhardt became extinct in 1442 and the sovereignty of the properties slowly moved towards Württemberg and Baden. It is suspected that the nobles of Straubenhardt initiated the foundation of the villages Conweiler, Feldrennach, Langenalb, Schwann as well as Arnbach, Dennach, Dobel, Neusatz and Rotensol. The discovery of a relief of the hunting goddess Diana, found in the wall of the rectory of Ottenhausen, indicates an early Roman settlement in this area. Ottenhausen which consists of the older village Rudmersbach and the newer part Ottenhausen was first documentary mentioned in 1262 with the name 'Rutmerspach'. Pfinzweiler which was mentioned in 1328 as hamlet 'uff dr Pfinz' was abandoned during the Thirty Years' War. The reestablishment of Pfinzweiler in 1713 can be traced back to 7 citizens of Feldrennach and one person from Conweiler.

On December 1, 1973, today's municipality Straubenhardt was created by the merger of the municipalities Conweiler, Schwann, Pfinzweiler-Feldrennach. On January 1, 1974 Ottenhausen joined Straubenhardt by a voluntary agreement and on January 1, 1975 Langenalb was incorporated by the order of the Baden-Wuerttemberg Municipal Reform Act . By nomenclature and adoption of the Straubenhardt coat of arms the historical connection to the earlier nobles of Straubenhardt was restored.

=== Coat of Arms of all Subdivisions ===
Conweiler

Feldrennach & Pfinzweiler

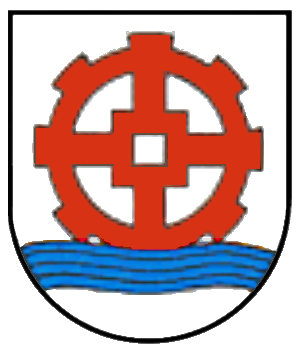
Langenalb

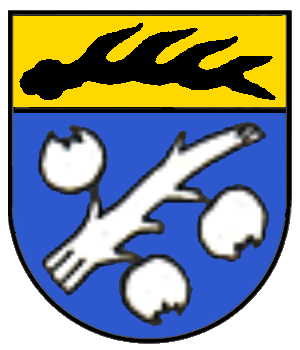
Ottenhausen

Schwann

=== Mayors ===
Until the year 1973 each of the five formerly independent subdivisions elected their own mayor.

- 1974 to 1991: Walter Weissinger (SPD)
- since 1991: Willi Rutschmann (CDU)
- since 2013: Helge Viehweg (SPD)

=== Municipal Council ===
The municipal elections in Straubenhardt on June 7, 2009 resulted in the following distribution of seats:

CDU	27,5%	−3,2	5 Seats	−1
SPD	28,7%	−1,5	5 Seats	±0
FW	25,1%	−0,4	5 Seats	±0
Grüne Liste	18,7%	+18,7	3 Seats	+3
