= Motodrom am Cottaweg =

Stadium in Leipzig, Germany

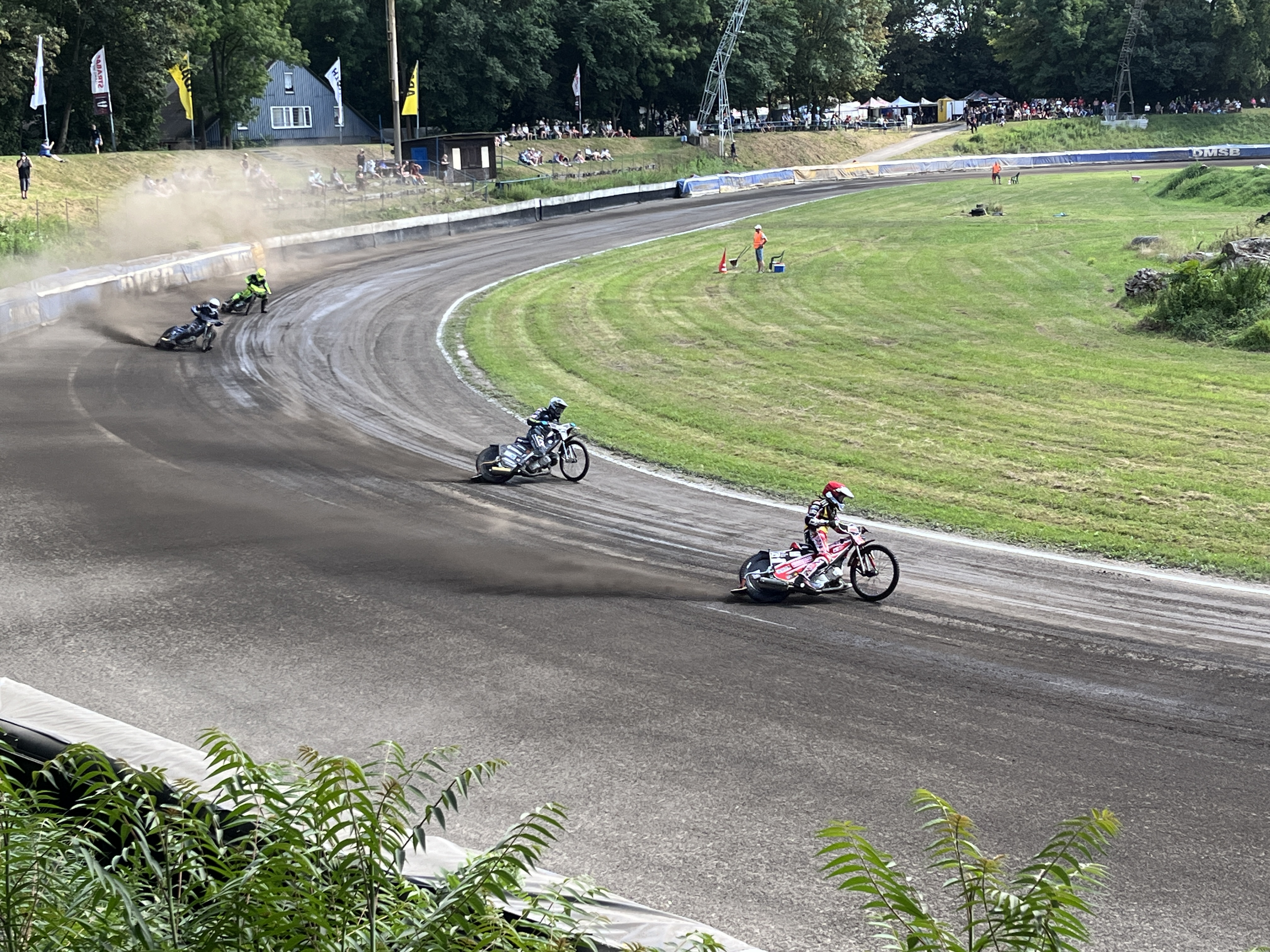
- North German Track Championship taking place in 2024 at the Motodrom
- Location: Cottaweg 04177 Leipzig, Germany
- Coordinates: 51°20′54″N 12°20′13″E
- Capacity: 3,000
- Opened: 11 May 1975
- Length: 0.395 km

The Motodrom am Cottaweg is a motorcycle speedway stadium on the west side of the Neue Luppe in Leipzig. It is surrounded by forest and located on the Cottaweg road, adjacent (on the north side) of the BSV Schönau football ground. The venue is used by the speedway club called Motorsport Club Post Leipzig e.V.

== History ==
Some time after World War II, the site was used for motocross and it was not until 1975 that the Leipzig City Council gave permission for a motorcycle speedway track to be built. The track opened on 11 May 1975. The East German Speedway Championship was held at the motodrom during May 1978.

The stadium hosted what was arguably the most important event in its history, when it held a qualifying round of the Speedway World Team Cup in 1991.

On 12 May 1996, the 395 metre track record was broken by Ryan Sullivan, who recorded 69.88 sec.
