= Lübbenau Speedway =

German motorcycle speedway team

MSC Jugend Lübbenau

Club information
- Track address: Glück Auf Speedwaystadion
- Country: Germany
- League: East German Championship

Major team honours
East German Championship runner-up	1980
East German Championship bronze	1977, 1982

Lübbenau Speedway is a German motorcycle speedway club called MSC Jugend Lübbenau and a speedway track known as the Glück Auf Speedwaystadion, which is located approximately 8 kilometres west of Lübbenau, off the L526 (51°51′26″N 13°51′49″E).

== History ==
The team called MSC Jugend Lübbenau participated in the East German Team Championship from 1977 to 1990. They won the silver medal in the 1980 Championship and won two bronze medals in 1977 and 1982 respectively. They were known as BKW Jugend Lübbenau at the time, carrying the local powerplant name for advertising purposes.

On 26 June 1988, the 330 metres track record was broken by Toni Kasper who recorded 62.5 sec.
