= Stroitel Stadium (Ufa) =

Stadium in Ufa, Russia

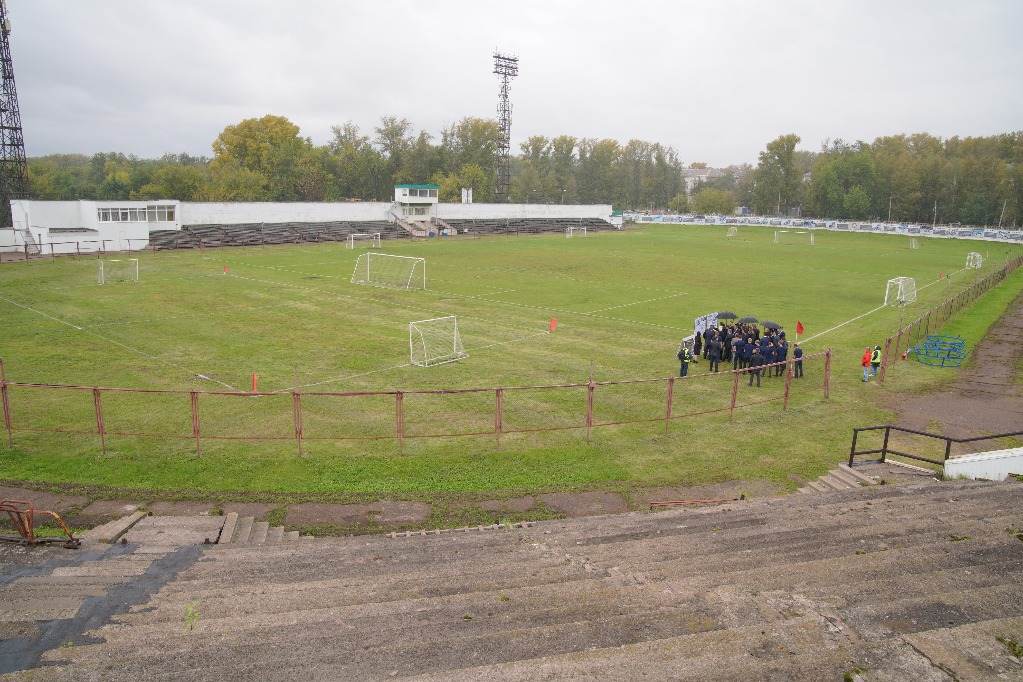
- 2019 view of the stadium
- Location: Aleksandra Nevskogo Ulitsa, 17, Ufa, Republic of Bashkortostan, Russia, 450000
- Coordinates: 54°49′02″N 56°05′42″E
- Opened: 1959

Stroitel Stadium (Russian: Стадион Строитель) is a sports stadium in Ufa. It is located north of the centre of the city, off the Aleksandra Nevskogo Ulitsa street in Neftekhimikov (Petrochemists') Park.

The stadium is primarily an Ice speedway venue and has hosted major ice speedway events. It is also used for ice skating and in the summer for association football. Since the closure of the Trud Stadium in Ufa in 2005, it is the only venue that hosts speedway in the city.

== History ==
The stadium opened in 1959 and once hosted motorcycle speedway but changes to the track resulted in it only being used for ice speedway. It was the venue for qualifying rounds of the Speedway World Championship in 1963 and the qualifying rounds of the Speedway World Team Cup in 1965 and 1967.

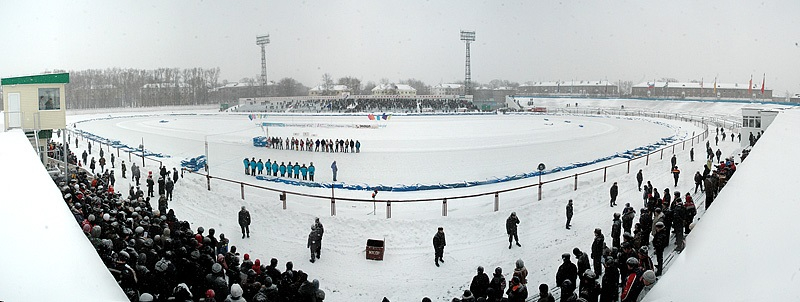
Pre-meeting parade for an ice speedway meeting

As an ice speedway venue, the stadium has hosted multiple rounds of the Individual Ice Speedway World Championship from the very first World championship in 1966 to 2012. It has also held the final of the Individual Ice Speedway European Championship in 2010, 2013, 2016, 2017 and 2019.

Over the last three decades the stadium has required modernisation and plans were drawn up by Mayor Sergey Grekov in November 2021 (as part of the 450th jubilee of Ufa) to modernise the stadium at the cost of 1.7 billion rubles.

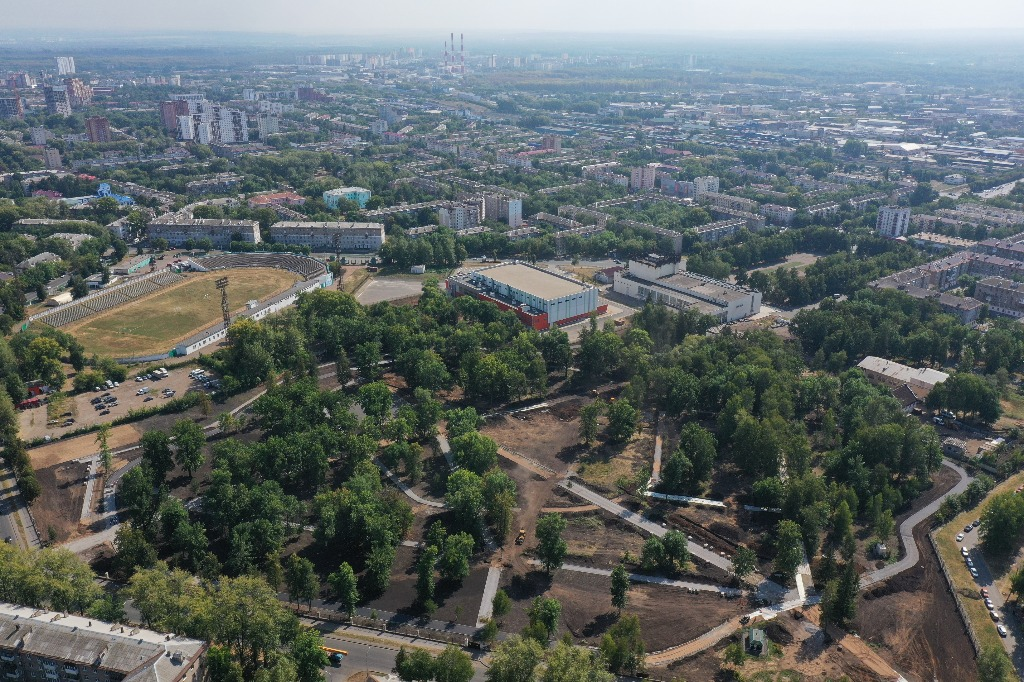
Aerial view

Since 2022, the stadium has been restricted to domestic use following the Fédération Internationale de Motocyclisme ban on Russian motorcycle riders, teams, officials, and competitions, as a result of the 2022 Russian invasion of Ukraine.

== See also ==
Ufa Speedway
