= Günter Harder Stadion =

Former stadium in Neubrandenburg, East Germany

- Interactive map of Günter Harder Stadion
- Location: 17033 Neubrandenburg, Germany
- Coordinates: 53°33′34″N 13°16′05″E

Construction
- Opened: 1949
- Closed: circa.1996

The Günter Harder Stadion was an multi purpose stadium in Neubrandenburg, Germany. The stadium was located on the eastern outskirts of the town, between the Demminer Straße and the Alfred-Lythall-Straße. The speedway team MC Neubrandenburg raced at the stadium and were champions of East Germany in 1988.

== History ==
The stadium was built in 1949 (in East Germany) and held first division football games. It received the name the Günter Harder Stadion in 1951, in honour of Günter Harder, a maritime police officer who was shot dead on 24 March 1951. He served as a symbolic figure in East Germany.

SC Neubrandenburg played many fixtures at the stadium, including during the 1963–64 season, which resulted in promotion to the top division of East German football the following year, the (1964–65 DDR-Oberliga).

A motorcycle speedway track was constructed around the football pitch in 1958 and was expanded in order to meet international standards. It reopened on 8 May 1962. The stadium was selected as the venue for the qualifying rounds of the 1964 Individual Speedway World Championship and the 1965 Individual Speedway World Championship.

The speedway team MC Neubrandenburg competed at the stadium from 1958 to 1996, taking part in the East German Team Speedway Championship and they won the Championship in 1988. The team were named MC Hydro Nord Neubrandenburg and then MC Geothermie Neubrandenburg for advertising purposes.

The stadium fell into disrepair and the speedway team folded in circa.1996. The stadium was later demolished and was eventually replaced by a parking garage, constructed in May 2022. In 2023, the stadium site was marked with a bronze sculpture.
