= Nässjö =

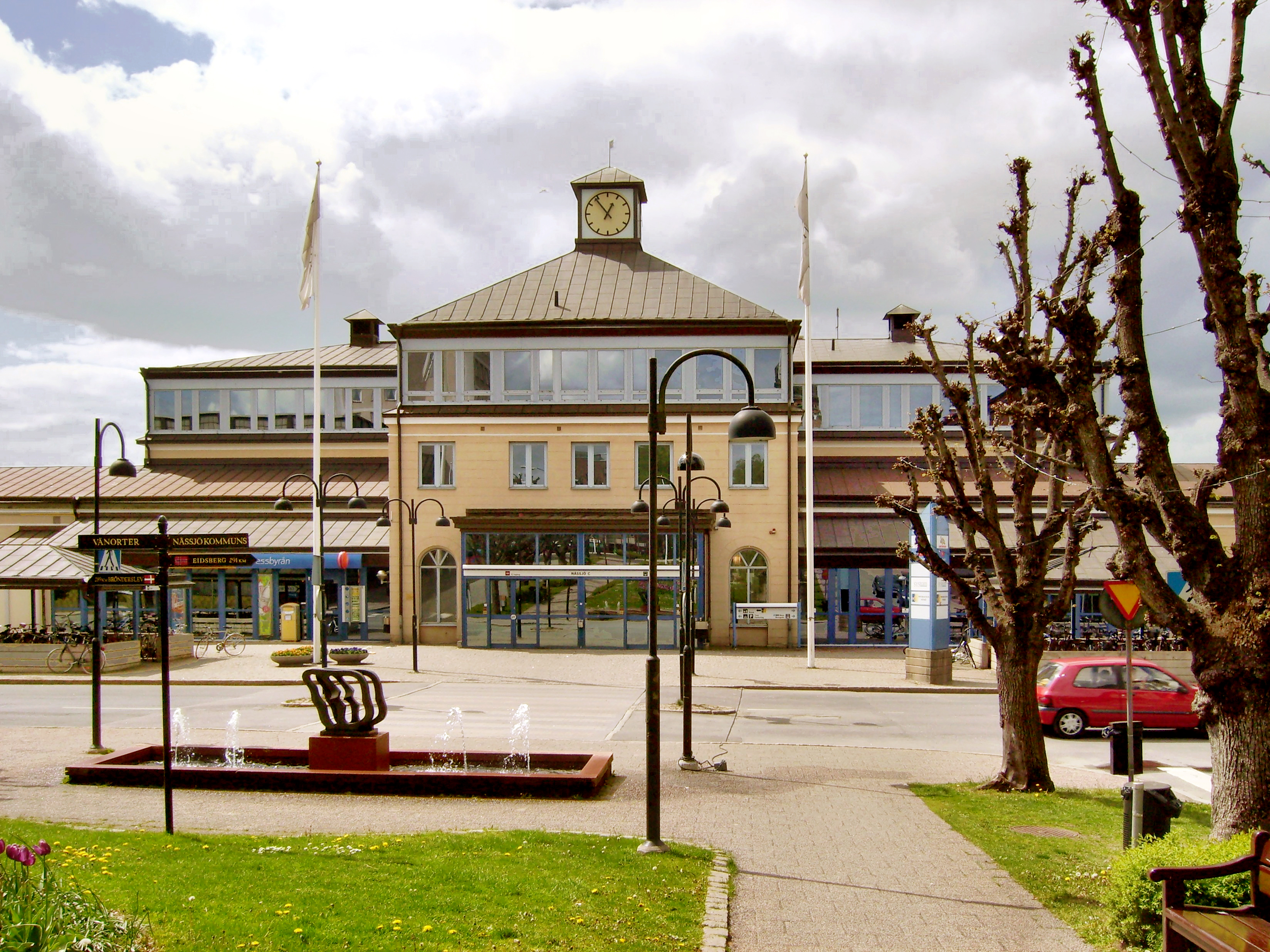
- Nässjö railway station

- Location within Jönköping Location within Sweden
- Coordinates: 57°39′N 14°41′E
- Country: Sweden
- Province: Småland
- County: Jönköping County
- Municipality: Nässjö Municipality

Area
  - Total: 11.44 km^{2} (4.42 sq mi)

Population (31 December 2010)
  - Total: 16,678
  - Density: 1,458/km^{2} (3,780/sq mi)
- Time zone: UTC+1 (CET)
  - Summer (DST): UTC+2 (CEST)

Nässjö (Swedish pronunciation: [ˈnɛ̂ɧːœ]) is a locality and the seat of Nässjö Municipality, Jönköping County, Sweden with 31,782 inhabitants in 2024.

== History ==
For many years, Nässjö was a rural village with agriculture as the dominant occupation. The turning point was the construction of the Swedish railway system. The southern main line railway, finished in 1864, passed through Nässjö. Later, other railways were inaugurated, whereby Nässjö, due to its geographical location in the country, became an important junction. A line to Katrineholm was opened in 1874, and that year also the opening of the Oskarshamn line; the one to Halmstad in 1882; to Kalmar in 1914. Today, Nässjö is the only Swedish junction where railways in six different directions meet.

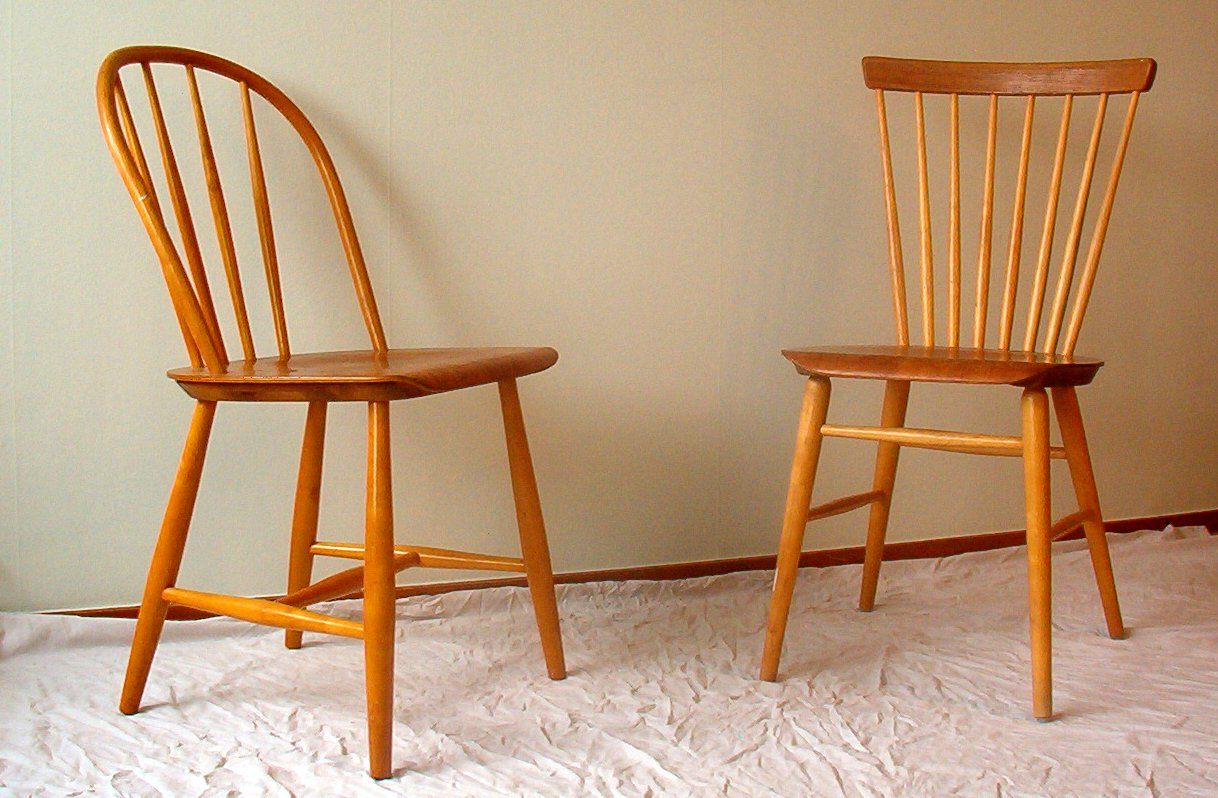
Swedish Windsor chairs

As a result, industries moved to Nässjö, and the population increased. The most important industries were wood industries due to the forest covered Småland province area, at a time when it had become possible to factory manufacture the wooden chair (a.k.a. Windsor chair). Nässjö attempted to get a charter, which was granted in 1914, making it one of the now defunct Cities of Sweden. It is since 1971 instead the seat of the much larger Nässjö Municipality.

Its population continued to increase throughout the 20th century. In the 1940s production of electrical installation equipment began, and the industry Eldon AB was for a long time the largest industry of the town.

The rock band Backyard Babies and metal band Kongh hail from Nässjö. The head of the largest ponzi scheme in the Nordic countries, Winclub/Wincapita, Mr Hannu Kailajärvi was arrested in Nässjö on December 10, 2008, after reportedly having lived there for some time.

== Geography ==
Climate data for Nässjö 1961-1990
Month	Jan	Feb	Mar	Apr	May	Jun	Jul	Aug	Sep	Oct	Nov	Dec	Year
Mean daily maximum °C (°F)	−1.4 (29.5)	−1.2 (29.8)	3.8 (38.8)	8.6 (47.5)	15.2 (59.4)	19.0 (66.2)	20.1 (68.2)	19.1 (66.4)	14.5 (58.1)	9.3 (48.7)	3.4 (38.1)	−0.2 (31.6)	9.2 (48.5)
Daily mean °C (°F)	−3.9 (25.0)	−4.0 (24.8)	−1.1 (30.0)	3.2 (37.8)	9.1 (48.4)	13.3 (55.9)	14.4 (57.9)	13.6 (56.5)	9.7 (49.5)	5.8 (42.4)	1.0 (33.8)	−2.4 (27.7)	4.9 (40.8)
Mean daily minimum °C (°F)	−6.4 (20.5)	−6.8 (19.8)	−6.0 (21.2)	−2.2 (28.0)	2.9 (37.2)	7.5 (45.5)	8.7 (47.7)	8.2 (46.8)	4.9 (40.8)	2.2 (36.0)	−1.6 (29.1)	−4.7 (23.5)	0.6 (33.0)
Source 1: SMHI Open Data
Source 2: SMHI Monthly Data 2002–2018

== Sport ==
Nässjö Motorstadion is a motorcycle speedway and flat track speedway venue located on the south west edge of the locality on Skogsvallen. The stadium hosts the NK Nässjö speedway team that has competed in the Swedish Speedway Team Championship and won the second division in 1997. The facility has hosted important events, including qualifying rounds of the Speedway World Championship in 1983, 1986 and 1991.

== Image gallery ==
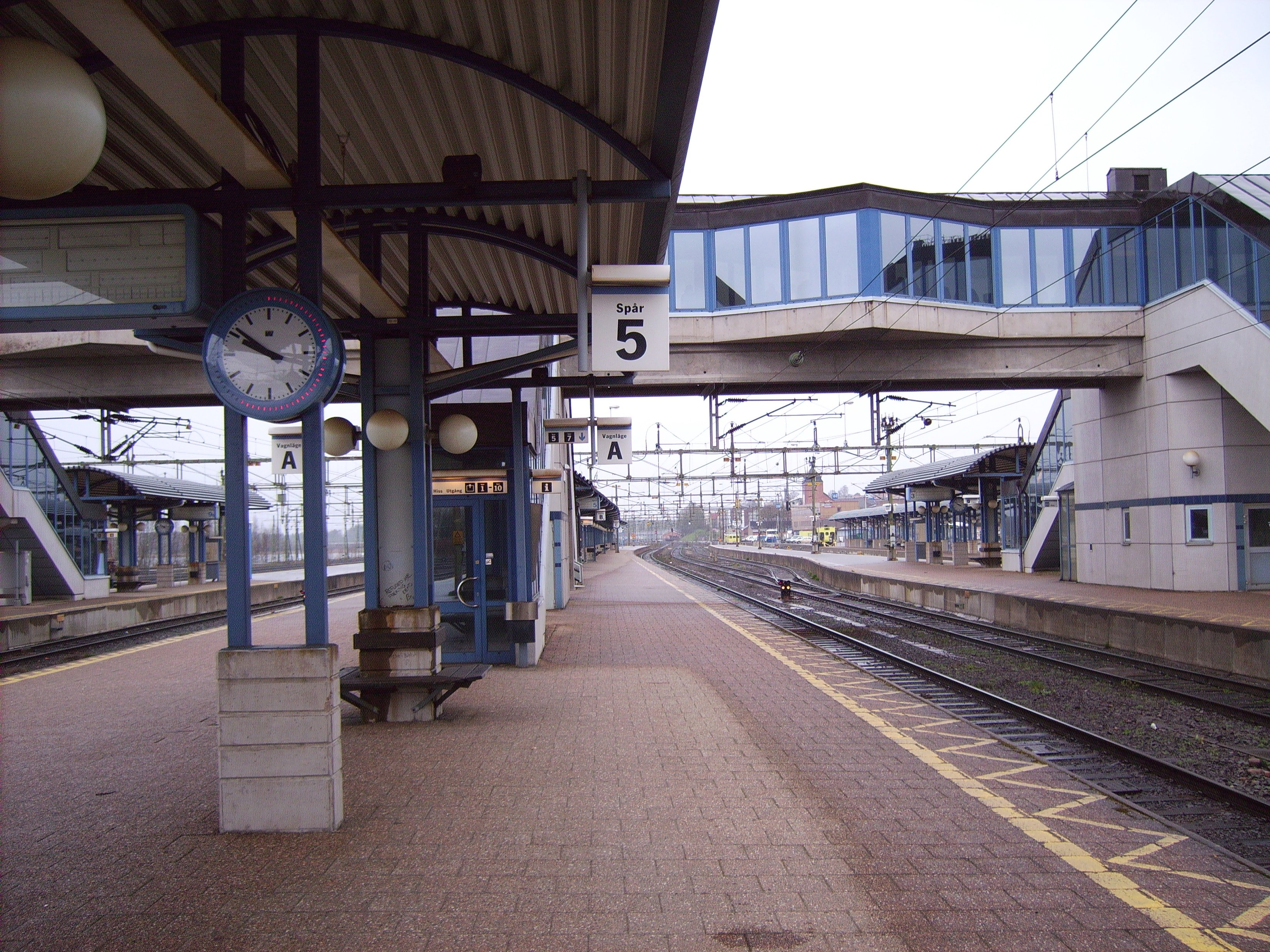
Nässjö Railway Station

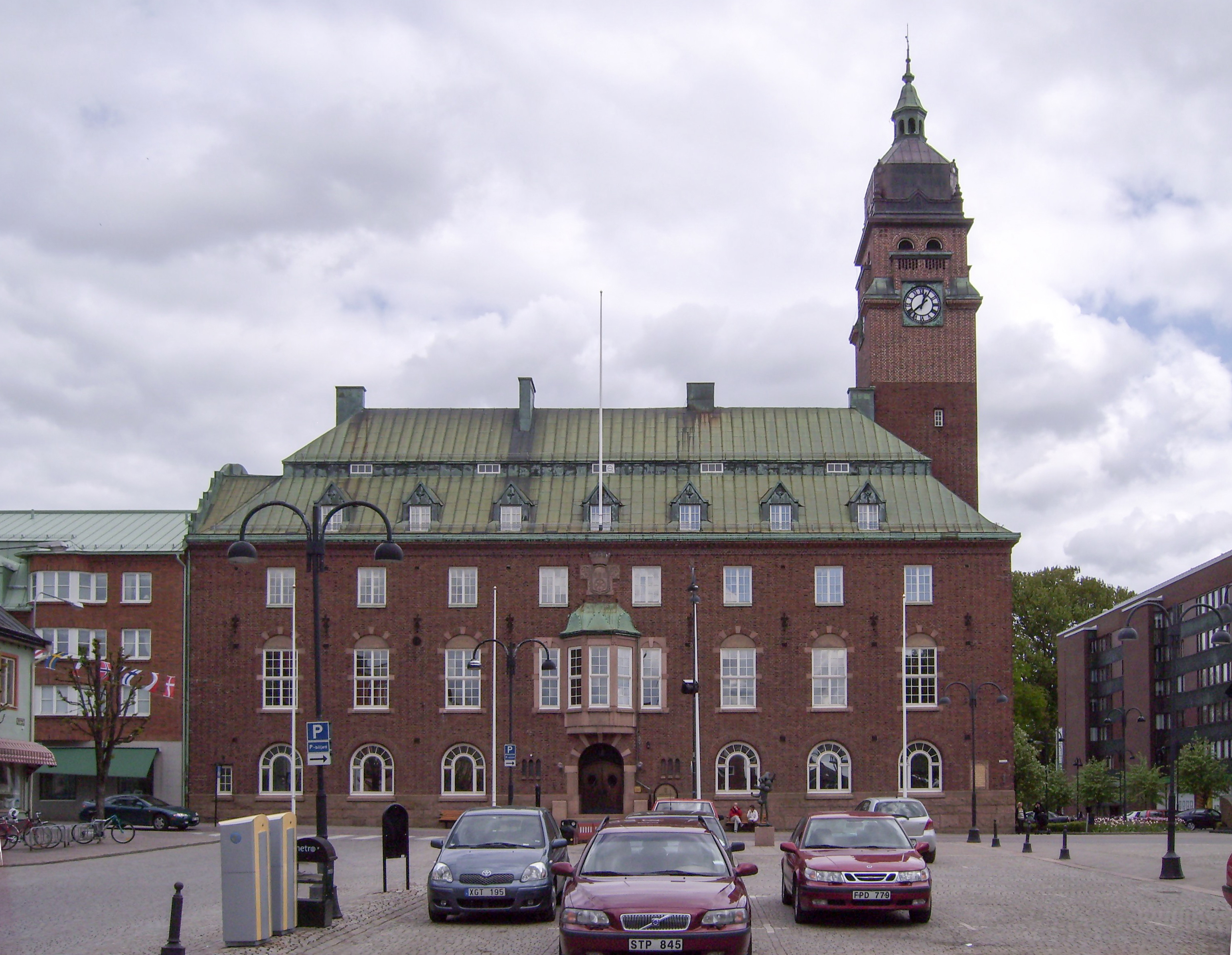
Nässjö City Hall

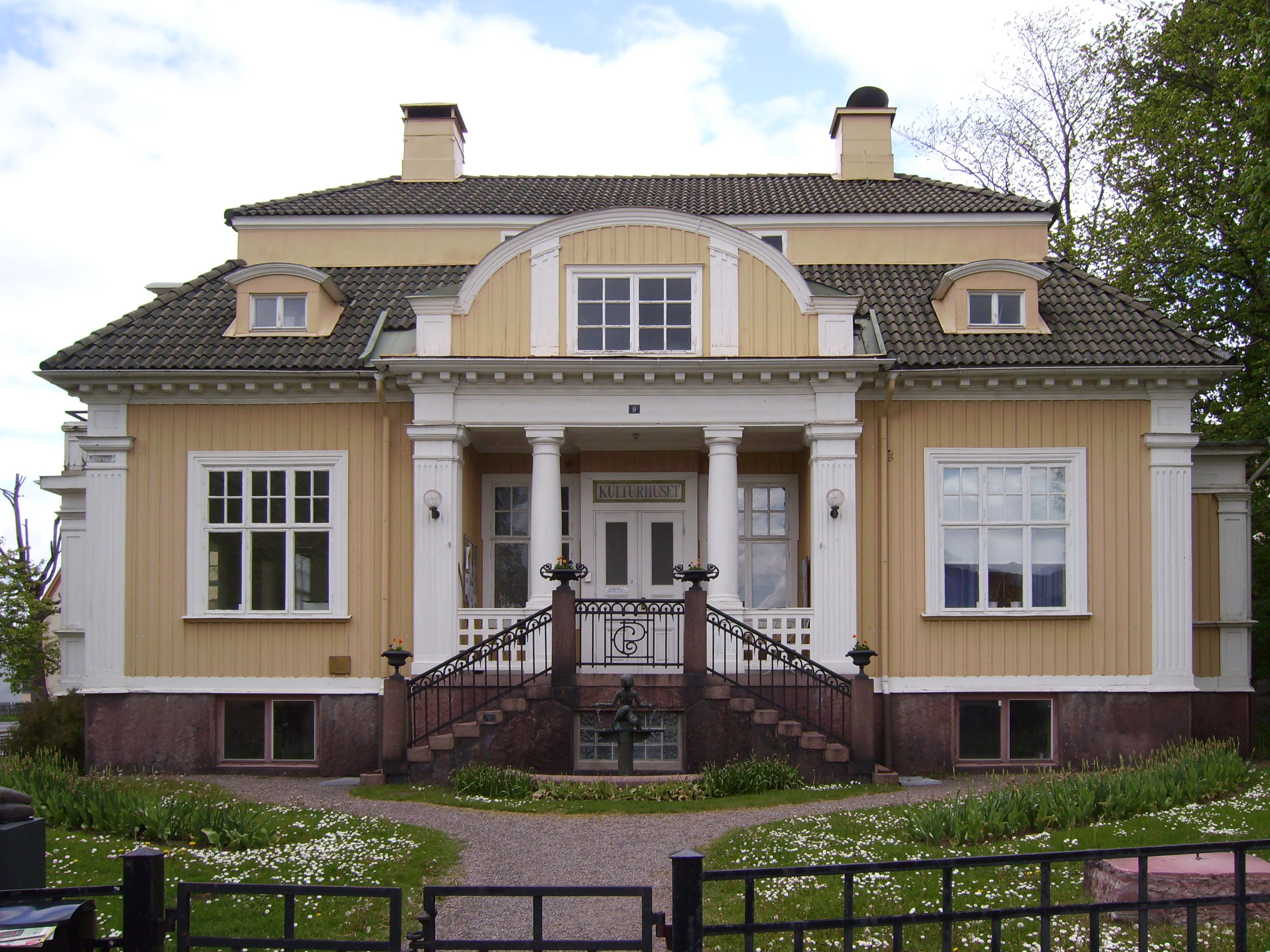
The House of Culture

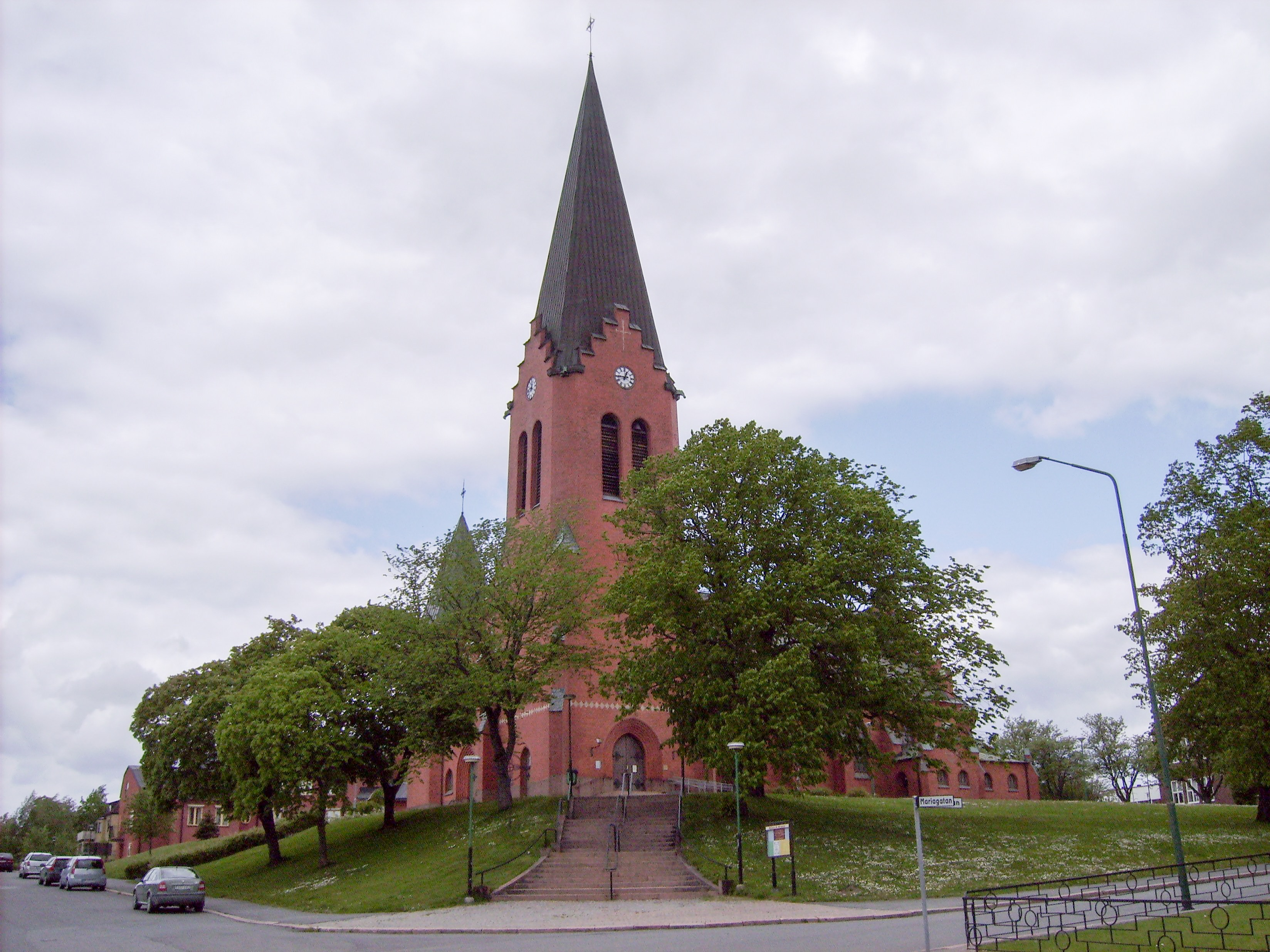
Nässjö Church

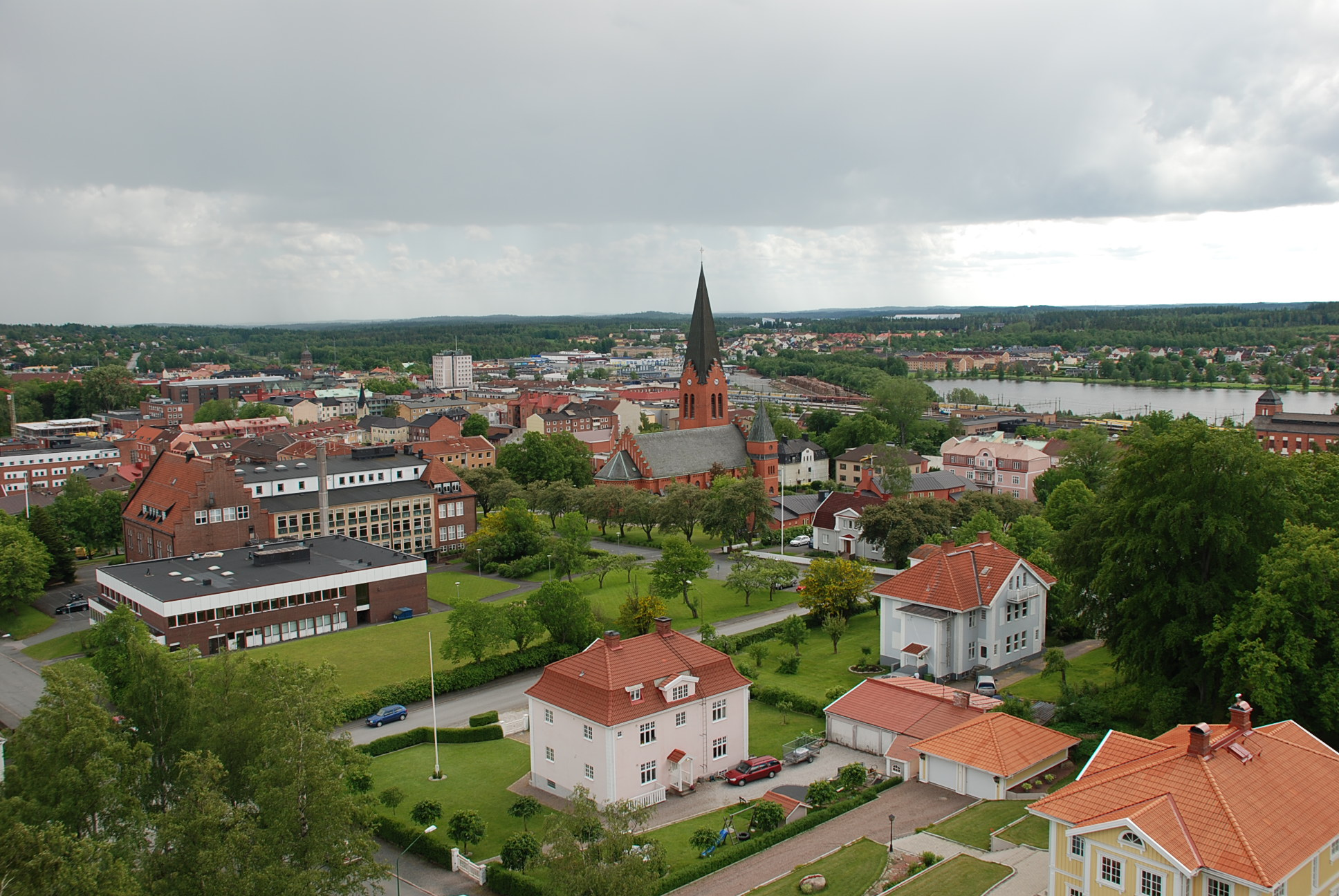
View of Nässjö from the water tower

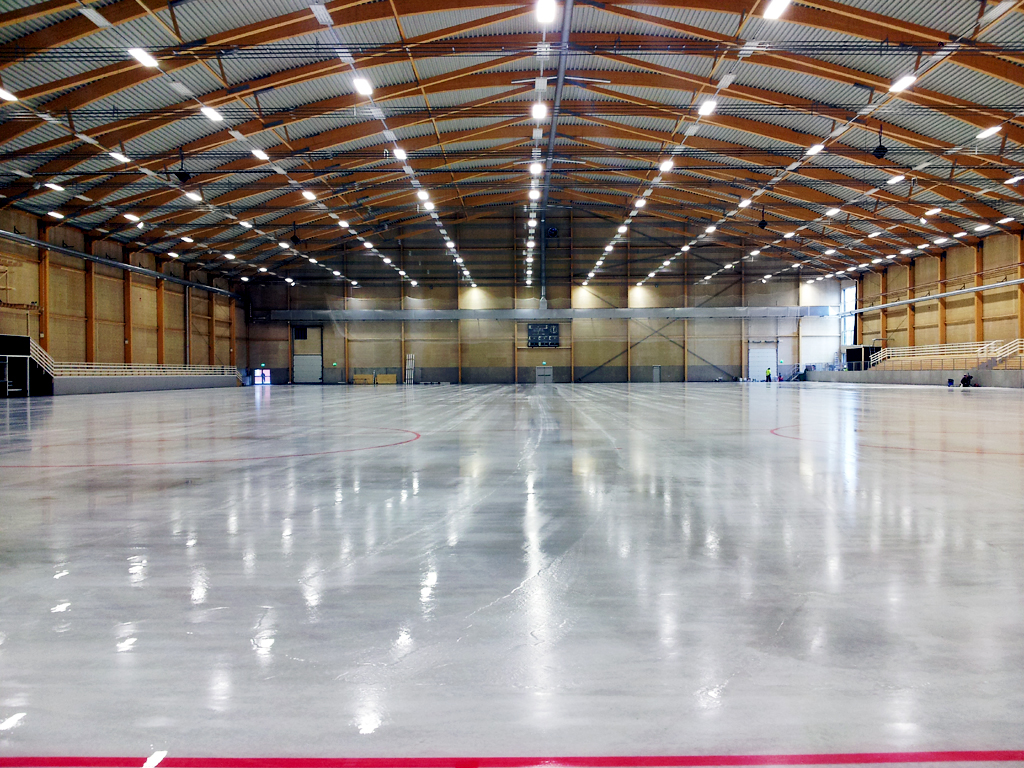
Stinsen Arena, bandy venue
