= European Athletics Championships =

International athletics tournament

- Status: active
- Genre: sports event
- Frequency: biennial (every 4 years pre-2010)
- Location: various
- Years active: active for 92 years
- Inaugurated: 1934
- Most recent: 2026
- Organiser: European Athletic Association
- Website: european-athletics.com
- 2026

The European Athletics Championships is a biennial (from 2010, pre-2010 if every 4 years) athletics event organised by the European Athletic Association and is recognised as the elite continental outdoor athletics championships for Europe.

== Editions ==
First held, for men only, in 1934 in Turin, and separately for women for the first time in Vienna in 1938, the Championships took place every four years following the end of the World War II, with the exception of the 1969 and 1971 editions, becoming a joint men's and women's competition from the third edition in 1946 in Oslo. Since 2010, they have been organised every two years, and when they coincide with the Summer Olympics, the marathon and racewalking events are not contested. From 2016, a half-marathon event has been held in those Olympic years, and both the marathon and half-marathon events held as part of the Championships also function as the principle European elite team events at those distances.

The championships were long dominated by Eastern Bloc countries, especially the Soviet Union and East Germany, but Great Britain now tops the all-time medal table.

In 2018 and 2022, the European Athletics Championships formed part of the quadrennial multi-sport European Championships, a new event designed and held by individual European sports federations. In 2022, European Athletics announced its intention to withdraw from the multi-sport event for 2026.

The 2020 edition set for Charlety Stadium in Paris was cancelled due to the COVID-19 pandemic, making this the first cancellation of the event since the 1942 championship was abandoned due to World War II. The event was not moved to an alternative date, with Munich continuing as the scheduled host in 2022.

An indoor equivalent, the European Athletics Indoor Championships, is organised by the European Athletic Association in odd numbered years.

While the European Games of 2015 featured athletics, as did the Games in 2023, these events are not editions of the European Athletics Championships. Instead, from 2023, the European Games athletics program consists of alternating editions of the biennial European Athletics Team Championships, a national team championships also arranged by European Athletics which includes European Games medals for individuals.

Notes: ♂ – men, ♀ – women

| Ed. | Year | Host city | Host country | Date | Venue | Events | Nations | Athletes | Top of the medal table |
|---|---|---|---|---|---|---|---|---|---|
| 1 | 1934 ♂ | Turin | Italy | 7–9 September | Stadio Benito Mussolini | 22 | 23 | 226 | Germany |
| 2 | 1938 ♂ | Paris | France | 3–5 September | Stade Olympique de Colombes | 23 | 23 | 272 | Germany |
| 2 | 1938 ♀ | Vienna | Germany (Note: Germany had annexed Austria in March 1938.) | 17–18 September | Praterstadion | 9 | 14 | 80 | Germany |
| 3 | 1946 | Oslo | Norway | 22–25 August | Bislett Stadium | 33 | 20 | 353 | Sweden |
| 4 | 1950 | Brussels | Belgium | 23–27 August | Heysel Stadium | 34 | 24 | 454 | (United Kingdom) Great Britain |
| 5 | 1954 | Bern | Switzerland | 25–29 August | Stadion Neufeld | 35 | 28 | 686 | Soviet Union |
| 6 | 1958 | Stockholm | Sweden | 19–24 August | Stockholm Olympic Stadium | 36 | 26 | 626 | Soviet Union |
| 7 | 1962 | Belgrade | Yugoslavia | 12–16 September | Stadion JNA | 36 | 29 | 670 | Soviet Union |
| 8 | 1966 | Budapest | Hungary | 30 August – 4 September | Népstadion | 36 | 30 | 769 | East Germany |
| 9 | 1969 | Piraeus | Greece | 16–21 September | Karaiskakis Stadium | 38 | 30 | 674 | East Germany |
| 10 | 1971 | Helsinki | Finland | 10–15 August | Olympiastadion | 38 | 29 | 857 | East Germany |
| 11 | 1974 | Rome | Italy | 2–8 September | Stadio Olimpico | 39 | 29 | 745 | East Germany |
| 12 | 1978 | Prague | Czechoslovakia | 29 August – 3 September | Stadion Evžena Rošického | 40 | 29 | 1004 | Soviet Union |
| 13 | 1982 | Athens | Greece | 6–12 September | Olympiakó Stàdio | 41 | 29 | 756 | East Germany |
| 14 | 1986 | Stuttgart | West Germany | 26–31 August | Neckarstadion | 43 | 31 | 906 | Soviet Union |
| 15 | 1990 | Split | Yugoslavia | 26 August – 2 September | Stadion Poljud | 43 | 33 | 952 | East Germany |
| 16 | 1994 | Helsinki | Finland | 7–14 August | Olympiastadion | 44 | 44 | 1113 | Russia |
| 17 | 1998 | Budapest | Hungary | 18–23 August | Népstadion | 46 | 44 | 1259 | (United Kingdom) Great Britain |
| 18 | 2002 | Munich | Germany | 6–11 August | Olympiastadion | 46 | 48 | 1244 | Russia |
| 19 | 2006 | Gothenburg | Sweden | 7–13 August | Ullevi | 47 | 48 | 1288 | Russia |
| 20 | 2010 | Barcelona | Spain | 27 July – 1 August | Estadi Olímpic Lluís Companys | 47 | 50 | 1323 | France |
| 21 | 2012 | Helsinki | Finland | 27 June – 1 July | Olympiastadion | 42 | 50 | 1230 | Germany |
| 22 | 2014 | Zürich | Switzerland | 12–17 August | Letzigrund | 47 | 50 | 1439 | (United Kingdom) Great Britain |
| 23 | 2016 | Amsterdam | Netherlands | 6–10 July | Olympic Stadium | 44 | 50 | 1329 | Poland |
| 24 | 2018 (Note: Part of the 2018 European Championships) | Berlin | Germany | 7–12 August | Olympiastadion | 48 | 49 (Note: Not including the ANA Athletes and the ART refugee athlete (DNS).) | 1439 | (United Kingdom) Great Britain |
| — | 2020 | Paris | France | 26–30 August | Stade Sébastien Charléty | Cancelled due to COVID-19 pandemic | | | |
| 25 | 2022 (Note: Part of the 2022 European Championships) | Munich | Germany | 15–21 August | Olympiastadion | 48 | 48 | 1495 | Germany |
| 26 | 2024 | Rome | Italy | 7–12 June | Stadio Olimpico | 47 | 48 | 1559 | Italy |
| 27 | 2026 | Birmingham | Great Britain | 10–16 August | Alexander Stadium | 50 | 49 | 1645 | Italy |
| 28 | 2028 | Chorzów | Poland | 3–8 June | Stadion Śląski | | | | |
| 29 | 2030 | Helsinki | Finland | | Olympiastadion | | | | |

== All-time medal table ==
Updated after the 2026 European Athletics Championships.

Former countries are pointed in italic. Team medals in half marathon and marathon are not included into this table (see European Half Marathon Cup and European Marathon Cup).

| Rank | Nation | Gold | Silver | Bronze | Total |
|---|---|---|---|---|---|
| 1 | (United Kingdom) Great Britain | 135 | 106 | 113 | 354 |
| 2 | Soviet Union | 120 | 110 | 101 | 331 |
| 3 | East Germany | 90 | 83 | 66 | 239 |
| 4 | Germany | 76 | 79 | 74 | 229 |
| 5 | France | 73 | 77 | 79 | 229 |
| 6 | Italy | 65 | 59 | 63 | 187 |
| 7 | Poland | 59 | 66 | 68 | 193 |
| 8 | Russia | 49 | 50 | 51 | 150 |
| 9 | Finland | 37 | 30 | 42 | 109 |
| 10 | Netherlands | 37 | 30 | 34 | 101 |
| 11 | West Germany | 36 | 44 | 51 | 131 |
| 12 | Spain | 36 | 30 | 41 | 107 |
| 13 | Sweden | 34 | 45 | 42 | 121 |
| 14 | Ukraine | 24 | 30 | 26 | 80 |
| 15 | Norway | 23 | 17 | 22 | 62 |
| 16 | Hungary | 19 | 25 | 24 | 68 |
| 17 | Greece | 17 | 11 | 11 | 39 |
| 18 | Czechoslovakia | 16 | 16 | 27 | 59 |
| 19 | Belgium | 16 | 16 | 15 | 47 |
| 20 | Portugal | 16 | 16 | 12 | 44 |
| 21 | Switzerland | 14 | 19 | 19 | 52 |
| 22 | Bulgaria | 12 | 16 | 14 | 42 |
| 23 | Turkey | 12 | 10 | 10 | 32 |
| 24 | Belarus | 10 | 13 | 12 | 35 |
| 25 | Croatia | 10 | 4 | 3 | 17 |
| 26 | Romania | 8 | 22 | 10 | 40 |
| 27 | Czech Republic | 8 | 14 | 13 | 35 |
| 28 | Ireland | 7 | 10 | 8 | 25 |
| 29 | Yugoslavia | 6 | 6 | 3 | 15 |
| 30 | Denmark | 4 | 7 | 4 | 15 |
| 31 | Estonia | 4 | 6 | 5 | 15 |
| 32 | Latvia | 4 | 3 | 4 | 11 |
| 33 | Slovenia | 4 | 2 | 3 | 9 |
| 34 | Lithuania | 3 | 4 | 6 | 13 |
| 35 | Austria | 3 | 2 | 6 | 11 |
| 36 | Israel | 3 | 2 | 5 | 10 |
| 37 | Iceland | 3 | 1 | 1 | 5 |
| 38 | Serbia | 2 | 8 | 4 | 14 |
| 39 | Slovakia | 2 | 5 | 1 | 8 |
| – | Authorised Neutral Athletes^{[1]} | 1 | 3 | 2 | 6 |
| 40 | Albania | 1 | 1 | 0 | 2 |
| 41 | Azerbaijan | 0 | 2 | 2 | 4 |
| 42 | Luxembourg | 0 | 2 | 0 | 2 |
| 43 | Montenegro | 0 | 1 | 1 | 2 |
| 44 | Moldova | 0 | 0 | 1 | 1 |
| Totals (44 entries) | | 1,099 | 1,103 | 1,099 | 3,301 |

- ^[1] ANA was the name, under which Russian athletes competed in the 2016 and 2018 Championships. Their medals were not included in the official medal table.

As of 2026, Andorra, Armenia, Bosnia and Herzegovina, Cyprus, Georgia, Gibraltar, Kosovo, Liechtenstein, Malta, Monaco, North Macedonia and San Marino have yet to win a medal. Saar competed once in 1954 European Athletics Championships without winning a medal. FR Yugoslavia competed twice in 1998 and 2002 European Athletics Championships, also without winning a medal.

== Multiple winners ==
Boldface denotes active athletes and highest medal count among all athletes (including these who not included in these tables) per type.

Sprinter Dina Asher-Smith holds the record for most gold medals, with eight, followed by discus thrower Sandra Elkasević (Perković) of Croatia and middle-distance runner Jakob Ingebrigtsen of Norway with seven gold medals.

=== Men ===
| Rank | Athlete | Country | Events | From | To | Gold | Silver | Bronze | Total |
|---|---|---|---|---|---|---|---|---|---|
| 1 | **Jakob Ingebrigtsen** | Norway | 1500 m / 5000 m | 2018 | 2026 | **7** | – | – | 7 |
| 2 | **Zharnel Hughes** | (United Kingdom) Great Britain | 100 m / 200 m / 4 × 100 m relay / Mixed 4 × 100 m relay | 2018 | 2026 | 6 | 2 | – | 8 |
| 3 | **Matthew Hudson-Smith** | (United Kingdom) Great Britain | 400 m / 4 × 400 m relay | 2014 | 2026 | 5 | 3 | 1 | **9** |
| 4 | Roger Black | (United Kingdom) Great Britain | 400 m / 4 × 400 m relay | 1986 | 1994 | 5 | 1 | – | 6 |
| 4 | Mo Farah | (United Kingdom) Great Britain | 5000 m / 10,000 m | 2006 | 2014 | 5 | 1 | – | 6 |
| 4 | Harald Schmid | West Germany | 400 m hurdles / 4 × 400 m relay | 1978 | 1986 | 5 | 1 | – | 6 |
| 7 | Mahiedine Mekhissi-Benabbad | France | 3000 m steeplechase / 1500 m | 2010 | 2018 | 5 | – | – | 5 |
| 7 | **Karsten Warholm** | Norway | 400 m hurdles / 4 × 400 m mixed relay | 2018 | 2026 | 5 | – | – | 5 |
| 9 | Christophe Lemaitre | France | 100 m / 200 m / 4 × 100 m relay | 2010 | 2014 | 4 | 2 | 2 | 8 |
| 10 | Kevin Borlée | Belgium | 400 m / 4 × 400 m relay | 2010 | 2022 | 4 | 2 | 1 | 7 |

=== Women ===
| Rank | Athlete | Country | Events | From | To | Gold | Silver | Bronze | Total |
|---|---|---|---|---|---|---|---|---|---|
| 1 | **Dina Asher-Smith** | (United Kingdom) Great Britain | 100 m / 200 m / 4 × 100 m relay / Mixed 4 × 100 m relay | 2016 | 2026 | **8** | 2 | 1 | **11** |
| 2 | **Sandra Elkasević (Perković)** | Croatia | Discus throw | 2010 | 2024 | 7 | – | – | 7 |
| 3 | **Femke Broeders-Bol** | Netherlands | 400 m / 800 m / 400 m hurdles / 4 × 400 m relay / 4 × 400 m mixed relay | 2022 | 2026 | 6 | – | 2 | 8 |
| 4 | Marita Koch | East Germany | 400 m / 4 × 400 m relay | 1978 | 1986 | 6 | – | – | 6 |
| 5 | Irena Szewińska (Kirszenstein) | Poland | 100 m / 200 m / 400 m / 4 × 100 m relay / 4 × 400 m relay / Long jump | 1966 | 1978 | 5 | 1 | 4 | 10 |
| 6 | Fanny Blankers-Koen | Netherlands | 100 m / 200 m / 80 m hurdles / 4 × 100 m relay | 1938 | 1950 | 5 | 1 | 2 | 8 |
| 7 | Marlies Göhr | East Germany | 100 m / 200 m / 4 × 100 m relay | 1978 | 1986 | 5 | 1 | 1 | 7 |
| 8 | Grit Breuer | East Germany; Germany | 400 m / 4 × 400 m relay | 1990 | 2002 | 5 | 1 | – | 6 |
| 8 | Heike Drechsler | East Germany; Germany | 200 m / Long jump | 1986 | 1998 | 5 | 1 | – | 6 |
| 10 | **Amy Hunt** | (United Kingdom) Great Britain | 100 m / 200 m / 4 × 100 m relay / Mixed 4 × 100 m relay | 2024 | 2026 | 5 | – | – | 5 |

== Multiple medallists ==
A total of 13 men and 17 women have won six or more medals at the competition. Dina Asher-Smith has won the most total medals, with eleven, followed by Irena Szewińska with ten. Matthew Hudson-Smith has won the most medals on the men's side, with nine.

=== Men ===
| Name | Country | Total | Gold | Silver | Bronze | Years |
|---|---|---|---|---|---|---|
| Matthew Hudson-Smith | (United Kingdom) Great Britain | 9 | 5 | 3 | 1 | 2014–2026 |
| Zharnel Hughes | (United Kingdom) Great Britain | 8 | 6 | 2 | 0 | 2018–2026 |
| Christophe Lemaitre | France | 8 | 4 | 2 | 2 | 2010–2014 |
| Jakob Ingebrigtsen | Norway | 7 | 7 | 0 | 0 | 2018–2026 |
| Kevin Borlée | Belgium | 7 | 4 | 2 | 1 | 2010–2022 |
| Roger Black | (United Kingdom) Great Britain | 6 | 5 | 1 | 0 | 1986–1994 |
| Mo Farah | (United Kingdom) Great Britain | 6 | 5 | 1 | 0 | 2006–2014 |
| Harald Schmid | West Germany | 6 | 5 | 1 | 0 | 1978–1986 |
| Pietro Mennea | Italy | 6 | 3 | 2 | 1 | 1971–1978 |
| Martyn Rooney | (United Kingdom) Great Britain | 6 | 3 | 2 | 1 | 2010–2018 |
| Jonathan Borlée | Belgium | 6 * | 3 | 1 * | 2 | 2010–2022 |
| Linford Christie | (United Kingdom) Great Britain | 6 | 3 | 1 | 2 | 1986–1994 |
| Jimmy Vicaut | France | 6 * | 1 | 3 | 2 * | 2010–2022 |

* including one medal in the relay event in which he participated in the heats only

=== Women ===
| Name | Country | Total | Gold | Silver | Bronze | Years |
|---|---|---|---|---|---|---|
| Dina Asher-Smith | (United Kingdom) Great Britain | 11 | 8 | 2 | 1 | 2016–2026 |
| Irena Szewińska (Kirszenstein) | Poland | 10 | 5 | 1 | 4 | 1966–1978 |
| Femke Broeders-Bol | Netherlands | 8 | 6 | 0 | 2 | 2022–2026 |
| Fanny Blankers-Koen | Netherlands | 8 | 5 | 1 | 2 | 1938–1950 |
| Renate Stecher (Meissner) | East Germany | 8 | 4 | 4 | 0 | 1969–1974 |
| Dafne Schippers | Netherlands | 8 | 4 | 3 | 1 | 2012–2018 |
| Sandra Elkasević (Perković) | Croatia | 7 | 7 | 0 | 0 | 2010–2024 |
| Marlies Göhr | East Germany | 7 | 5 | 1 | 1 | 1978–1986 |
| Lieke Klaver | Netherlands | 7 | 3 | 0 | 4 | 2022–2026 |
| Gina Lückenkemper | Germany | 7 | 2 | 2 | 3 | 2016–2026 |
| Myriam Soumaré | France | 7 | 1 | 3 | 3 | 2010–2014 |
| Marita Koch | East Germany | 6 | 6 | 0 | 0 | 1978–1986 |
| Grit Breuer | East Germany; Germany | 6 | 5 | 1 | 0 | 1990–2002 |
| Heike Drechsler | East Germany; Germany | 6 | 5 | 1 | 0 | 1986–1998 |
| Anita Włodarczyk | Poland | 6 | 4 | 1 | 1 | 2010–2024 |
| Irina Privalova | Russia | 6 | 3 | 2 | 1 | 1994–1998 |
| Yevgeniya Sechenova | Soviet Union | 6 | 2 | 2 | 2 | 1946–1950 |

=== Most golds in a single championships ===
British sprinter Amy Hunt became the first and, to date, only athlete to win four gold medals at a single championships; taking the gold at the 2026 European Athletics Championships in the women's 100 metres, the women's 200 metres, the mixed 4 x 100 m relay, and the women's 4 x 100 m relay.

Prior to Hunt's achievement, the most decorated athlete in a single Championship was Dutch legend Fanny Blankers-Koen who achieved four medals, three golds across the women's 100 m, 200 m and 80 m hurdles and one silver, the women's 4 x 100 m relay at the 1950 European Athletics Championships.

=== Most medals in the same event ===
A total of 24 men and 14 women have won four or more medals in the same event. Sandra Elkasević (Perković) of Croatia is the only athlete, male or female, to win the same event (the women's discus throw) seven times (between 2010 and 2024). Only one athlete of each sex, Matt Hudson-Smith and Dina Asher-Smith, have won four medals in two different events, in his case the 400 metres and the 4 x 400 metres relay, in hers the 200 metres and the 4 x 100 metres relay.

==== Men ====
| No | G/S/B | Athlete | Country | Years | Event |
|---|---|---|---|---|---|
| 5 | (3/2/0) | Igor Ter-Ovanesyan | Soviet Union | 1958–1971 | Long jump |
| 5* | (3/1*/1) | Jonathan Borlée | Belgium | 2010–2022 | 4 × 400 m relay |
| 5 | (3/1/1) | Kevin Borlée | Belgium | 2010–2022 | 4 × 400 m relay |
| 5 | (2/2/1) | Matthew Hudson-Smith | (United Kingdom) Great Britain | 2014–2026 | 4 × 400 m relay |
| 4 | (4/0/0) | Steve Backley | (United Kingdom) Great Britain | 1990–2002 | Javelin throw |
| 4 | (4/0/0) | Colin Jackson | (United Kingdom) Great Britain | 1990–2002 | 110 m hurdles |
| 4 | (4/0/0) | Jakob Ingebrigtsen | Norway | 2018–2026 | 5000 m |
| 4 | (4/0/0) | Jānis Lūsis | Soviet Union | 1962–1974 | Javelin throw |
| 4 | (4/0/0) | Mahiedine Mekhissi-Benabbad | France | 2010–2018 | 3000 m steeplechase |
| 4 | (4/0/0) | Armand Duplantis | Sweden | 2018–2026 | Pole vault |
| 4 | (4/0/0) | Miltiadis Tentoglou | Greece | 2018–2026 | Long jump |
| 4 | (4/0/0) | Karsten Warholm | Norway | 2018–2026 | 400 m hurdles |
| 4 | (4/0/0) | Gianmarco Tamberi | Italy | 2016–2026 | High jump |
| 4 | (3/1/0) | Dylan Borlée | Belgium | 2016–2024 | 4 × 400 m relay |
| 4 | (3/1/0) | Mo Farah | (United Kingdom) Great Britain | 2006–2014 | 5000 m |
| 4 | (3/1/0) | Matthew Hudson-Smith | (United Kingdom) Great Britain | 2014–2026 | 400 m |
| 4 | (3/0/1) | Adam Kszczot | Poland | 2010–2018 | 800 m |
| 4 | (3/0/1) | Renaud Lavillenie | France | 2010–2018 | Pole vault |
| 4 | (3/0/1) | Wojciech Nowicki | Poland | 2016–2024 | Hammer throw |
| 4 | (3/0/1) | David Storl | Germany | 2010–2018 | Shot put |
| 4 | (2/2/0) | Viktor Saneyev | Soviet Union | 1969–1978 | Triple jump |
| 4* | (1/2/1*) | Jimmy Vicaut | France | 2010–2022 | 4 × 100 m relay |
| 4 | (1/2/1) | Bence Halász | Hungary | 2018–2026 | Hammer throw |
| 4 | (0/3/1) | Gerd Kanter | Estonia | 2006–2016 | Discus throw |
| 4 | (0/2/2) | Alexander Kosenkow | Germany | 2002–2014 | 4 × 100 m relay |
| 4 | (0/1/3) | Lothar Milde | East Germany | 1962–1971 | Discus throw |

* including one medal in the relay event in which he participated in the heats only

==== Women ====
| No | G/S/B | Athlete | Country | Years | Event |
|---|---|---|---|---|---|
| 7 | (7/0/0) | Sandra Elkasević (Perković) | Croatia | 2010–2024 | Discus throw |
| 6 | (4/1/1) | Anita Włodarczyk | Poland | 2010–2024 | Hammer throw |
| 5 | (3/1/1) | Gesa Felicitas Krause | Germany | 2012–2026 | 3000 m steeplechase |
| 5 | (2/3/0) | Katerina Stefanidi | Greece | 2014–2024 | Pole vault |
| 4 | (4/0/0) | Nadezhda Chizhova | Soviet Union | 1966–1974 | Shot put |
| 4 | (4/0/0) | Heike Drechsler | East Germany; Germany | 1986–2002 | Long jump |
| 4* | (3*/1/0) | Asha Philip | (United Kingdom) Great Britain | 2014–2024 | 4 × 100 m relay |
| 4 | (3/1/0) | Dina Asher-Smith | (United Kingdom) Great Britain | 2016–2026 | 4 × 100 m relay |
| 4 | (3/0/1) | Nafissatou Thiam | Belgium | 2014–2024 | Heptathlon |
| 4 | (2/1/1) | Malaika Mihambo | Germany | 2016–2024 | Long jump |
| 4 | (2/1/1) | Dina Asher-Smith | (United Kingdom) Great Britain | 2016–2026 | 200 m |
| 4 | (1/3/0) | Floria Gueï | France | 2012–2018 | 4 × 400 m relay |
| 4 | (1/1/2) | Barbora Špotáková | Czech Republic | 2010–2022 | Javelin throw |
| 4 | (1/1/2) | Linda Stahl | Germany | 2010–2016 | Javelin throw |
| 4 | (0/1/3) | Shanice Craft | Germany | 2014–2026 | Discus throw |

* including one medal in the relay event in which she participated in the heats only

== Most appearances ==
A total of 50 men and 44 women have at least 6 appearances.

=== Men ===
| No | Name | Country | Years | Events |
|---|---|---|---|---|
| 7 | Jesús Ángel García | Spain | 1994–2018 | 50 km walk |
| 7 | Zoltán Kővágó * | Hungary | 1998–2018 | Discus throw |
| 7 | Jesús España | Spain | 2002–2018 | 5000 m / Half marathon / Marathon |
| 7 | Gerd Kanter | Estonia | 2002–2018 | Discus throw |
| 7 | Marian Oprea | Romania | 2002–2018 | Triple jump |
| 7 | David Söderberg | Finland | 2002–2018 | Hammer throw |
| 7 | Daniele Meucci | Italy | 2006–2024 | 5000 m / 10,000 m / Half marathon / Marathon |
| 7 | Eivind Henriksen | Norway | 2010–2024 | Hammer throw |
| 7 | Asmir Kolašinac | Serbia | 2010–2024 | Shot put |
| 7 | Apostolos Parellis | Cyprus | 2010–2024 | Discus throw |
| 7 | Dimitrios Tsiamis | Greece | 2010–2024 | Triple jump |
| 7 | Andreas Vojta | Austria | 2010–2024 | 1500 m / 5000 m / 10,000 m / Half marathon |
| 6 | Abdon Pamich | Italy | 1954–1971 | 20 km walk / 50 km walk |
| 6 | Ludvík Daněk | Czechoslovakia | 1962–1978 | Discus throw |
| 6 | Nenad Stekić | Yugoslavia | 1969–1990 | Long jump |
| 6 | Virgilijus Alekna | Lithuania | 1994–2014 | Discus throw |
| 6 | Dwain Chambers * | (United Kingdom) Great Britain | 1998–2014 | 100 m / 4 × 100 m relay |
| 6 | Serhiy Lebid | Ukraine | 1998–2014 | 5000 m / 10,000 m |
| 6 | Nicola Vizzoni | Italy | 1998–2014 | Hammer throw |
| 6 | Szymon Ziółkowski | Poland | 1998–2014 | Hammer throw |
| 6 | João Vieira | Portugal | 1998–2018 | 20 km walk / 50 km walk |
| 6 | Gregory Sedoc | Netherlands | 2002–2016 | 110 m hurdles |
| 6 | Johan Wissman | Sweden | 2002–2016 | 200 m / 400 m / 4 × 100 m relay |
| 6 | Hamza Alić | Bosnia and Herzegovina | 2002–2018 | Shot put |
| 6 | Fabrizio Donato | Italy | 2002–2018 | Triple jump |
| 6 | Ángel David Rodríguez | Spain | 2002–2018 | 100 m / 4 × 100 m relay |
| 6 | Konstantinos Filippidis | Greece | 2006–2018 | Pole vault |
| 6 | Kafétien Gomis | France | 2006–2018 | Long jump |
| 6 | Mustafa Mohamed | Sweden | 2006–2022 | 3000 m steeplechase / 10,000 m / Half marathon / Marathon |
| 6 | Jonathan Borlée | Belgium | 2010–2022 | 200 m / 400 m / 4 × 400 m relay |
| 6 | Kevin Borlée | Belgium | 2010–2022 | 400 m / 4 × 400 m relay |
| 6 | Javier Cienfuegos | Spain | 2010–2022 | Hammer throw |
| 6 | Stefano La Rosa | Italy | 2010–2022 | 5000 m / 10,000 m / Half marathon / Marathon |
| 6 | Renaud Lavillenie | France | 2010–2022 | Pole vault |
| 6 | Andriy Protsenko | Ukraine | 2010–2022 | High jump |
| 6 | Jimmy Vicaut | France | 2010–2022 | 100 m / 4 × 100 m relay |
| 6 | Eusebio Cáceres | Spain | 2010–2024 | Long jump |
| 6 | Konstantinos Douvalidis | Greece | 2010–2024 | 110 m hurdles |
| 6 | Henrik Ingebrigtsen | Norway | 2010–2024 | 1500 m / 5000 m |
| 6 | Marcel Lomnický | Slovakia | 2010–2024 | Hammer throw |
| 6 | Tiidrek Nurme | Estonia | 2010–2024 | 5000 m / Half marathon / Marathon |
| 6 | Tuomas Seppänen | Finland | 2010–2024 | Hammer throw |
| 6 | Jakub Vadlejch | Czech Republic | 2010–2024 | Javelin throw |
| 6 | Jan Veleba | Czech Republic | 2010–2024 | 100 m / 4 × 100 m relay |
| 6 | Polat Kemboi Arıkan | Turkey | 2012–2024 | 5000 m / 10,000 m / Half marathon |
| 6 | Thomas Barr | Ireland | 2012–2024 | 400 m hurdles / 4 × 400 m relay / 4 × 400 m mixed relay |
| 6 | Andrius Gudžius | Lithuania | 2012–2024 | Discus throw |
| 6 | Gianmarco Tamberi | Italy | 2012–2024 | High jump |
| 6 | Robert Urbanek | Poland | 2012–2024 | Discus throw |
| 6 | Vladimir Vukicevic | Norway | 2012–2024 | 110 m hurdles |

* including participation at one European Championships at which he was disqualified for a doping offence

=== Women ===
| No | Name | Country | Years | Events |
|---|---|---|---|---|
| 9 | Mélina Robert-Michon | France | 1998–2026 | Discus throw |
| 8 | Martina Ratej | Slovenia | 2006–2024 | Javelin throw |
| 7 | Krisztina Papp | Hungary | 2002–2018 | 5000 m / 10,000 m / Half marathon |
| 7 | Martina Hrašnová | Slovakia | 2002–2024 | Hammer throw |
| 7 | Dragana Tomašević | Serbia | 2006–2022 | Discus throw |
| 7 | Sandra Elkasević (Perković) | Croatia | 2010–2024 | Discus throw |
| 6 | Helena Fibingerová | Czechoslovakia | 1969–1986 | Shot put |
| 6 | Heike Drechsler (Daute) | East Germany; Germany | 1982–2002 | Long jump / 200 m |
| 6 | Fernanda Ribeiro | Portugal | 1986–2010 | 3000 m / 10,000 m / Marathon |
| 6 | Felicia Țilea-Moldovan * | Romania | 1990–2010 | Javelin throw |
| 6 | Nuria Fernández | Spain | 1998–2014 | 800 m / 1500 m / 5000 m |
| 6 | Ruth Beitia | Spain | 2002–2016 | High jump |
| 6 | Berta Castells | Spain | 2002–2016 | Hammer throw |
| 6 | Merja Korpela | Finland | 2002–2016 | Hammer throw |
| 6 | Dana Velďáková | Slovakia | 2002–2016 | Triple jump |
| 6 | Inês Henriques | Portugal | 2002–2022 | 20 km walk / 35 km walk / 50 km walk |
| 6 | Barbora Špotáková | Czech Republic | 2002–2022 | Javelin throw |
| 6 | Ásdís Hjálmsdóttir | Iceland | 2006–2018 | Javelin throw |
| 6 | Kathrin Klaas | Germany | 2006–2018 | Hammer throw |
| 6 | Éva Orbán | Hungary | 2006–2018 | Hammer throw |
| 6 | Olha Saladukha | Ukraine | 2006–2018 | Triple jump |
| 6 | Patricia Sarrapio | Spain | 2006–2018 | Triple jump |
| 6 | Fionnuala McCormack | Ireland | 2006–2022 | 3000 m steeplechase / 10,000 m / Marathon |
| 6 | Patrícia Mamona | Portugal | 2010–2022 | Triple jump |
| 6 | Sara Moreira | Portugal | 2010–2022 | 5000 m / 10,000 m / Half marathon / Marathon |
| 6 | Madara Palameika | Latvia | 2010–2022 | Javelin throw |
| 6 | Jamile Samuel | Netherlands | 2010–2022 | 100 m / 200 m / 4 × 100 m relay |
| 6 | Tina Šutej | Slovenia | 2010–2022 | Pole vault |
| 6 | Ivana Vuleta (Španović) | Serbia | 2010–2022 | Long jump |
| 6 | Bianca Ghelber (Perie) | Romania | 2010–2024 | Hammer throw |
| 6 | Karoline Bjerkeli Grøvdal | Norway | 2010–2024 | 3000 m steeplechase / 5000 m / 10,000 m / Half marathon |
| 6 | Airinė Palšytė | Lithuania | 2010–2024 | High jump |
| 6 | Anna Ryzhykova (Yaroshchuk) | Ukraine | 2010–2024 | 400 m hurdles / 4 × 400 m relay |
| 6 | Anita Włodarczyk | Poland | 2010–2024 | Hammer throw |
| 6 | Anne Zagré | Belgium | 2010–2024 | 100 m hurdles / 4 × 100 m relay |
| 6 | Iga Baumgart-Witan | Poland | 2012–2024 | 400 m / 4 × 400 m relay |
| 6 | Mirela Demireva | Bulgaria | 2012–2024 | High jump |
| 6 | Luiza Gega | Albania | 2012–2024 | 1500 m / 3000 m steeplechase |
| 6 | Mujinga Kambundji | Switzerland | 2012–2024 | 100 m / 200 m / 4 × 100 m relay |
| 6 | Line Kloster | Norway | 2012–2024 | 400 m / 400 m hurdles / 4 × 400 m relay |
| 6 | Līna Mūze | Latvia | 2012–2024 | Javelin throw |
| 6 | Irina Rodrigues | Portugal | 2012–2024 | Discus throw |
| 6 | Katerina Stefanidi | Greece | 2012–2024 | Pole vault |
| 6 | Justyna Święty-Ersetic | Poland | 2012–2024 | 400 m / 4 × 400 m relay |

* including participation at one European Championships at which she was disqualified for a doping offence

== See also ==
- European Athletics Indoor Championships
- European Running Championships
- International Athletics Championships and Games
- List of European Athletics Championships medalists (men)
- List of European Athletics Championships medalists (women)
- List of European records in athletics
- List of stripped European Athletics Championships medals
- 4 × 400 metres relay at European Championships
- World Para Athletics European Championships
