= 4 × 400 metres relay at European Championships =

The 4 × 400 metres relay (athletics track event) has been included in European Athletics Championships since 1934 in Turin for men and since 1969 in Athens for women. There are 13 countries that have won medals, with Great Britain being the most successful country, with a total of 9 gold and 18 overall medals.

== Men ==
=== List of medalists ===
Championship	Gold	Silver	Bronze
(Kingdom of Italy) 1934 Turin	Germany	France	Sweden
(France) 1938 Paris	Germany	(United Kingdom) Great Britain	Sweden
(Norway) 1946 Oslo	France	(United Kingdom) Great Britain	Sweden
(Belgium) 1950 Brussels	(United Kingdom) Great Britain	Italy	Sweden
(Switzerland) 1954 Bern	France	West Germany	Finland
(Sweden) 1958 Stockholm	(United Kingdom) Great Britain	West Germany	Sweden
(Socialist Federal Republic of Yugoslavia) 1962 Belgrade	West Germany	(United Kingdom) Great Britain	Switzerland
(Hungary) 1966 Budapest	Poland	West Germany	East Germany
(Greece) 1969 Athens	France	Soviet Union	West Germany
(Finland) 1971 Helsinki	West Germany	Poland	Italy
(Italy) 1974 Rome	(United Kingdom) Great Britain	West Germany	Finland
(Czech Republic) 1978 Prague	West Germany	Poland	(Czech Republic) Czechoslovakia
(Greece) 1982 Athens	West Germany	(United Kingdom) Great Britain	Soviet Union
(Germany) 1986 Stuttgart	(United Kingdom) Great Britain	West Germany	Soviet Union
(Socialist Federal Republic of Yugoslavia) 1990 Split	(United Kingdom) Great Britain	West Germany	East Germany
(Finland) 1994 Helsinki	(United Kingdom) Great Britain	France	Russia
(Hungary) 1998 Budapest	(United Kingdom) Great Britain	Poland	Spain
(Germany) 2002 Munich	(United Kingdom) Great Britain	Russia	France
(Sweden) 2006 Gothenburg	France	(United Kingdom) Great Britain	Poland
(Spain) 2010 Barcelona	Russia	(United Kingdom) Great Britain	Belgium
(Finland) 2012 Helsinki	Belgium	(United Kingdom) Great Britain	Germany
(Switzerland) 2014 Zurich	(United Kingdom) Great Britain	Russia	Poland
(Netherlands) 2016 Amsterdam	Belgium	Poland	(United Kingdom) Great Britain
(Germany) 2018 Berlin	Belgium	(United Kingdom) Great Britain	Spain
(Germany) 2022 Munich	(United Kingdom) Great Britain	Belgium	France
(Italy) 2024 Rome	Belgium	Italy	Germany
(United Kingdom) 2026 Birmingham	Italy	(United Kingdom) Great Britain	Netherlands

=== Medal table ===
	Country	Gold	Silver	Bronze	Total
1	(United Kingdom) Great Britain	10	9	1	20
2	Germany*	6	6	3	15
3	France	4	2	2	8
4	Belgium	4	1	1	6
5	Poland	1	4	2	7
6	Russia**	1	3	3	7
7	Italy	1	2	1	4
8	Sweden	-	-	5	5
9	East Germany; Finland; Spain	-	-	2	2
12	(Czech Republic) Czechoslovakia; Switzerland; Netherlands	-	-	1	1

*Germany's medals includes results by West Germany
**Russia's medals includes results by the Soviet Union

== Women ==
=== List of medalists ===
Championship	Gold	Silver	Bronze
(Greece) 1969 Athens	(United Kingdom) Great Britain	France	West Germany
(Finland) 1971 Helsinki	East Germany	West Germany	Soviet Union
(Italy) 1974 Rome	East Germany	Finland	Soviet Union
(Czech Republic) 1978 Prague	East Germany	Soviet Union	Poland
(Greece) 1982 Athens	East Germany	(Czech Republic) Czechoslovakia	Soviet Union
(Germany) 1986 Stuttgart	East Germany	West Germany	Poland
(Socialist Federal Republic of Yugoslavia) 1990 Split	East Germany	Soviet Union	(United Kingdom) Great Britain
(Finland) 1994 Helsinki	France	Russia	Germany
(Hungary) 1998 Budapest	Germany	Russia	(United Kingdom) Great Britain
(Germany) 2002 Munich	Germany	Russia	Poland
(Sweden) 2006 Gothenburg	Russia	Belarus	Poland
(Spain) 2010 Barcelona	Russia	Germany	(United Kingdom) Great Britain
(Finland) 2012 Helsinki	Ukraine	France	Czech Republic
(Switzerland) 2014 Zurich	France	Ukraine	(United Kingdom) Great Britain
(Netherlands) 2016 Amsterdam	(United Kingdom) Great Britain	France	Italy
(Germany) 2018 Berlin	Poland	France	(United Kingdom) Great Britain
(Germany) 2022 Munich	Netherlands	Poland	(United Kingdom) Great Britain
(Italy) 2024 Rome	Netherlands	(Republic of Ireland) Ireland	Belgium
(United Kingdom) 2026 Birmingham	Netherlands	(United Kingdom) Great Britain	Italy

=== Medal table ===
	Country	Gold	Silver	Bronze	Total
1	East Germany	6	-	-	6
2	Netherlands	3	-	-	3
3	Russia*	2	5	3	10
4	France	2	4	-	6
5	Germany**	2	3	2	7
6	(United Kingdom) Great Britain	2	1	6	9
7	Ukraine	1	1	-	2
8	Poland	1	1	4	6
9	Czech Republic***	-	1	1	2
10	Finland; Belarus (Republic of Ireland) Ireland	-	1	-	1
13	Italy	-	-	2	2
14	Belgium	-	-	1	1

*Russia's medals include results by the Soviet Union
**Germany's medals include results by West Germany
***Medals of the Czech republic include results by Czechoslovakia

== See also ==
- List of athletics events
- Sport of athletics
- Track and field
