= 2028 European Athletics Championships =

28th European Athletics Championships
- Dates: 3–8 June
- Host city: Chorzów, Poland
- Venue: Silesian Stadium
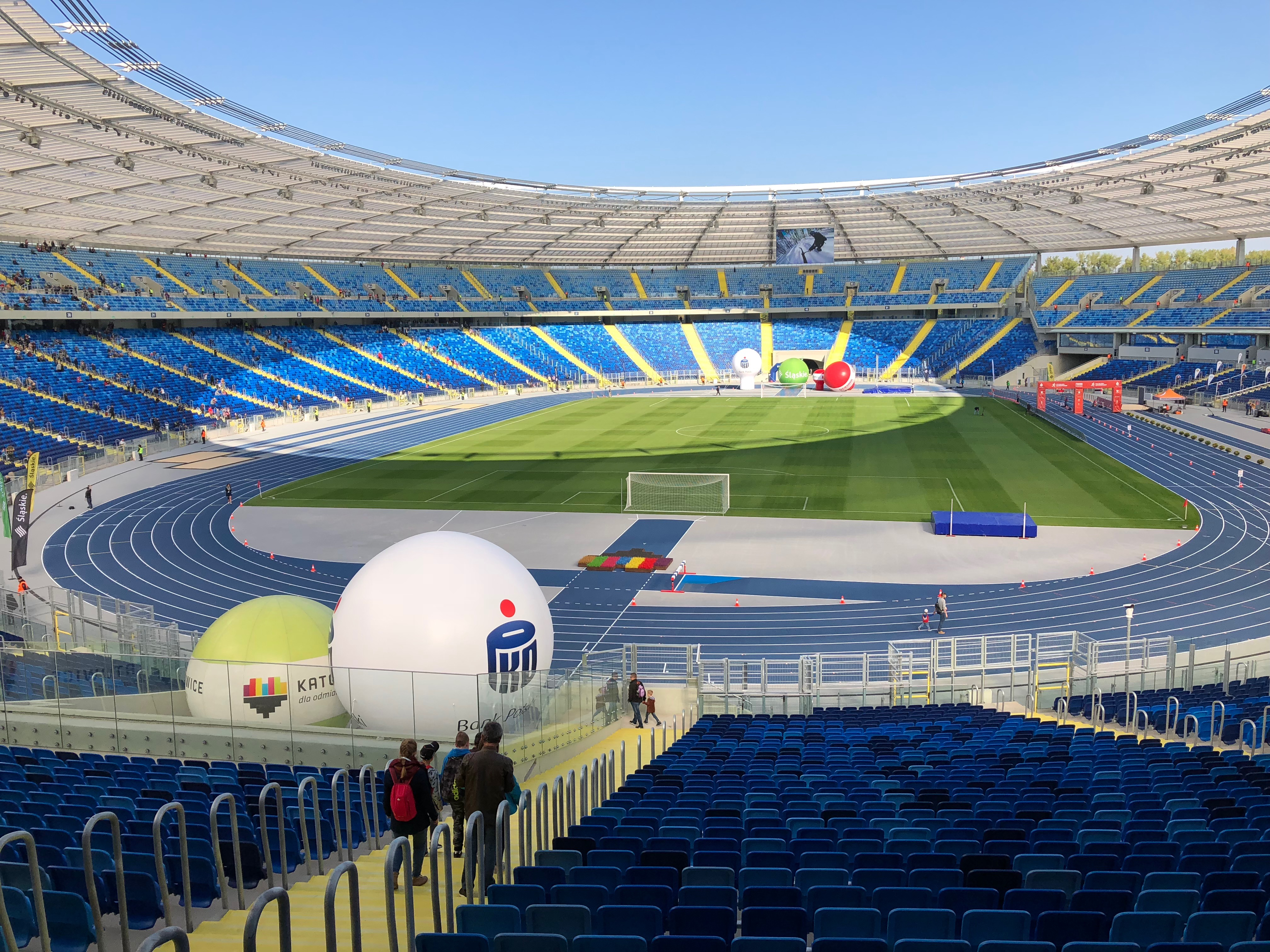
- Level: Senior
- Type: Outdoor
- Events: 50

The 28th European Athletics Championships will be held from 3 to 8 June 2028 at the Silesian Stadium in Chorzów, Poland.

This is the first time that Poland will have staged the European Athletics Championships although Chorzów hosted the 2021 World Athletics Relays and the 2021 European Athletics Team Championships Super League, hosts Diamond League meeting since 2022, and athletics events of the 2023 European Games. Stadion Śląski was rebuilt between 2009 and 2017 and has a fully covered capacity of 55,211.

On 30 May 2021, the European Athletic Association (EAA), the Polish Athletic Association (PZLA) and the Silesian Voivodeship signed a Letter of Intent for hosting the 2028 European Athletics Championships. Katowice-Silesia previously bid for the 2024 edition which was awarded to Rome.
