= Silesian Stadium =

Stadium in Chorzów, Poland

Coordinates: 50°17′18″N 18°58′23″E

- Stadion Śląski
- "Kocioł Czarownic" (Witches' Cauldron)

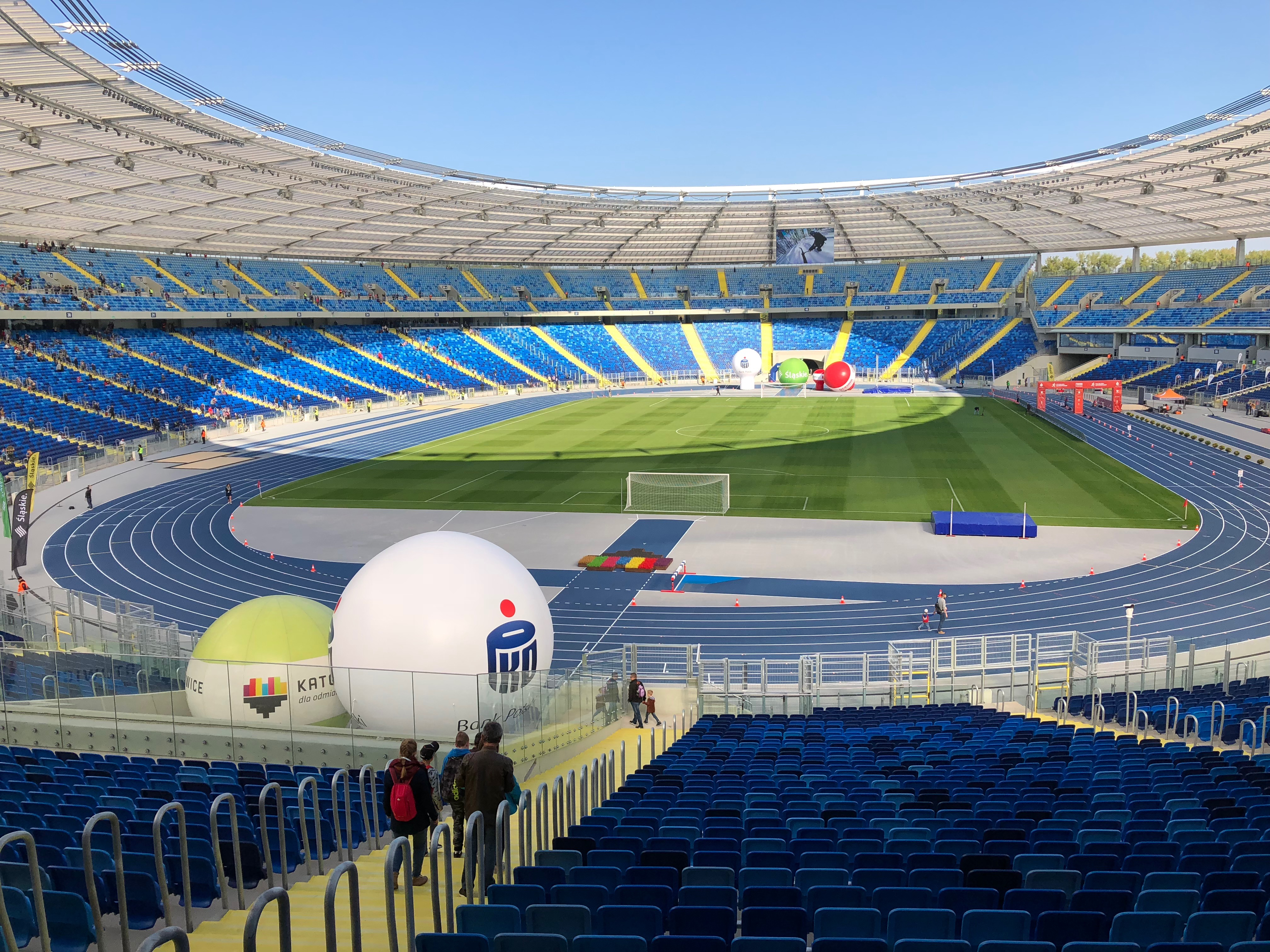
- UEFA Category 4 Stadium
- Interactive map of Silesian Stadium
- Full name: Silesian Stadium
- Location: ul. Katowicka 10; 41-500 Chorzów; Silesia, Poland
- Owner: Silesian Regional Assembly
- Operator: Stadion Śląski Sp. z o.o.
- Capacity: 54,378
- Surface: Grass
- Record attendance: 130,000 (1973 Speedway World Championship; 2 September 1973)
- Field size: 105 x 68 m

Construction
- Built: 1951–1956
- Opened: 22 July 1956; 1 October 2017
- Expanded: 2009–2017
- Cost: c. 650 million PLN c. 155 million €
- Architect: GMP Architekten

Tenants
- Ruch Chorzów; Poland national football team (1956–2009, 2018– )

Website
- Official Website

The Silesian Stadium (Polish: Stadion Śląski; Polish: [ˈstadjɔn ˈɕlɔ̃skʲi]) is a sport stadium located on the premises of Silesian Park in Chorzów, Poland. The stadium has a fully covered capacity of 54,378, after refurbishment completed in October 2017. The stadium hosted many Poland national football team matches and for many decades was Poland's national stadium. After the National Stadium in Warsaw was completed, the Silesian Stadium lost that role. The stadium was not in operation between 2009 and 2017 due to its ongoing reconstruction.

Silesian Stadium is a UEFA Category 4 stadium and hosts the annual Kamila Skolimowska Memorial, a Diamond League meeting. The stadium hosted the athletics events of the 2023 European Games and is set to host the 2028 European Athletics Championships.

== History ==
In 1950, as a part of an ambitious project to build Silesian Park, plans for Silesian Stadium were drawn up by Julian Brzuchowski. Construction began in 1951, and the stadium opened in 1956. The stadium was inaugurated on 22 July 1956 with a match against East Germany.

In 1993, the stadium officially was branded as Polish national stadium, due to the state of the venue in Warsaw. The stadium regularly hosted football matches, as well as concerts and other events.

=== Modernization ===
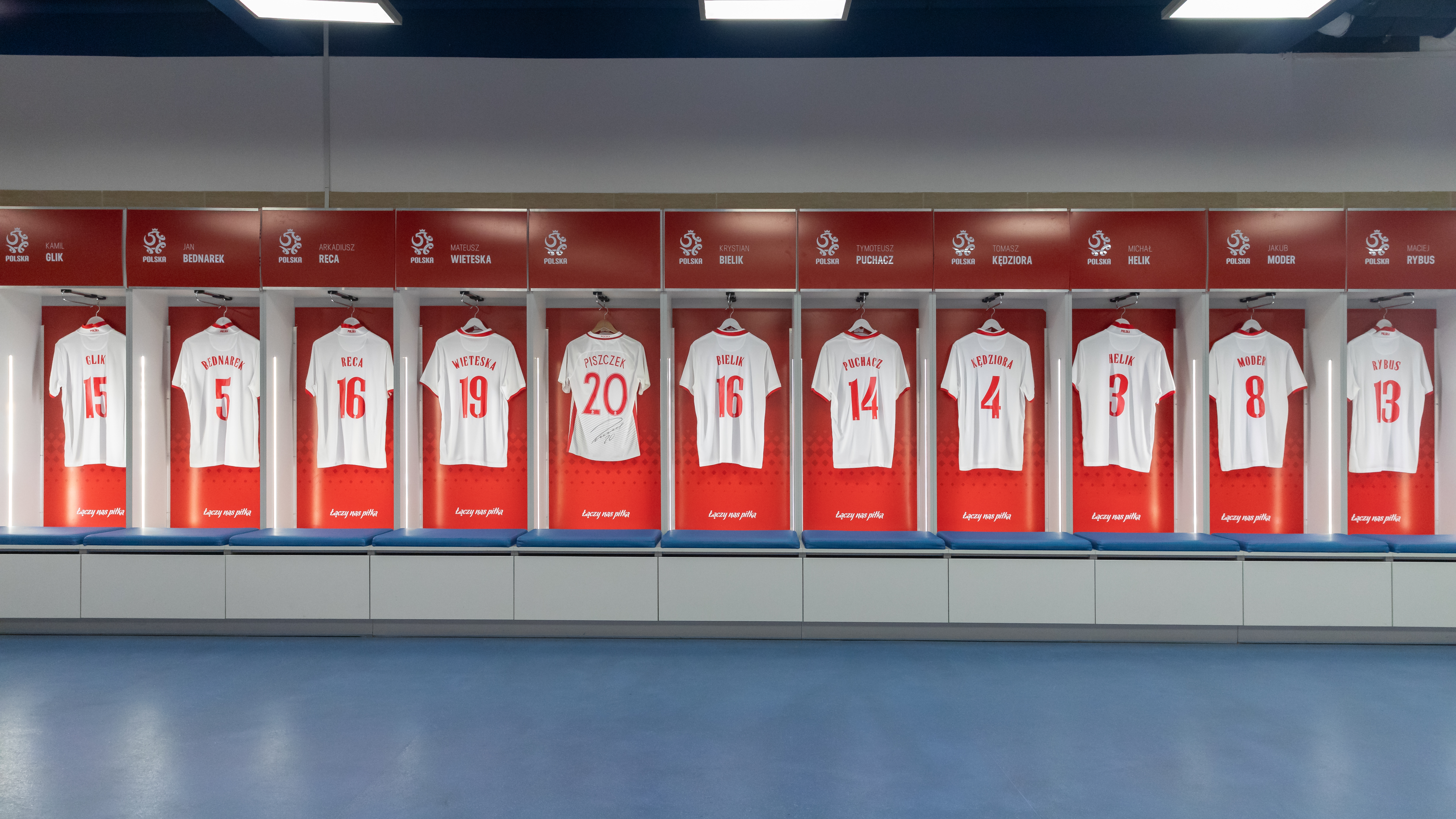
Football jerseys of the Polish national team in the locker room of the stadium

Beginning in 2009, the stadium underwent modernization in order to be a host stadium for UEFA Euro 2012 tournament. The rebuild included the construction of a 43,000 square metre roof, new stands, lighting, video screens and an improved sound system. The new roof collapsed in 2011 significantly delaying the project, which was finally completed in 2017.

The speedway track has been replaced with a traditional track that will allow Chorzów to host international athletics events.

Though originally planned to be completed by autumn 2011 for 415 million złoty, the finishing touches were only completed in 2017 costing around 650 million złoty.

The venue was also shortlisted as the Polish candidate for UEFA Euro 2020.

== Events ==
=== Football ===
==== Poland national football team ====
===== Before renovation =====
No.	Date	Match	Result	Turnout
1	22 July 1956	Poland – East Germany	0–2	90,000
2	20 October 1957	Poland – Soviet Union	2–1	93,000
3	11 May 1958	Poland – (Republic of Ireland) Ireland	2–2	80,000
4	14 September 1958	Poland – Hungary	1–3	90,000
5	28 June 1959	Poland – Spain	2–4	71,469
6	8 November 1959	Poland – Finland	6–2	22,000
7	26 June 1960	Poland – Bulgaria	4–0	25,000
8	25 June 1961	Poland – Yugoslavia	1–1	57,000
9	5 November 1961	Poland – Denmark	5–0	12,000
10	10 October 1962	Poland – Northern Ireland	0–2	31,496
11	2 June 1963	Poland – Romania	1–1	40,000
12	23 May 1965	Poland – Scotland	1–1	67,462
13	3 May 1966	Poland – Hungary	1–1	95,000
14	5 July 1966	Poland – England	0–1	70,000
15	21 May 1967	Poland – Belgium	3–1	57,050
16	24 April 1968	Poland – Turkey	8–0	17,000
17	30 October 1968	Poland – (Republic of Ireland) Ireland	1–0	18,000
18	7 September 1969	Poland – Netherlands	2–1	85,000
19	14 October 1970	Poland – Albania	3–0	8,507
20	6 June 1973	Poland – England	2–0	73,714
21	26 September 1973	Poland – Wales	3–0	70,181
22	10 September 1975	Poland – Netherlands	4–1	70,409
23	24,March 1976	Poland – Argentina	1–2	60,000
24	21 September 1977	Poland – Denmark	4–1	80,000
25	29 October 1977	Poland – Portugal	1–1	80,000
26	4 April 1979	Poland – Hungary	1–1	60,000
27	2 May 1979	Poland – Netherlands	2–0	71,298
28	26 September 1979	Poland – East Germany	1–1	63,938
29	6 June 1980	Poland – Czechoslovakia	1–1	45,000
30	2 May 1981	Poland – East Germany	1–0	74,000
31	2 September 1981	Poland – West Germany	0–2	70,000
32	22 May 1983	Poland – Soviet Union	1–1	69,044
33	11 September 1985	Poland – Belgium	0–0	68,978
34	16 November 1985	Poland – Italy	1–0	20,000
35	19 October 1988	Poland – Albania	1–0	35,000
36	11 October 1989	Poland – England	0–0	32,423
37	25 October 1989	Poland – Sweden	0–2	12,000
38	29 May 1993	Poland – England	1–1	65,000
39	2 April 1997	Poland – Italy	0–0	32,000
40	31 May 1997	Poland – England	0–2	32,000
41	27 May 1998	Poland – Russia	3–1	7,000
42	31 March 1999	Poland – Sweden	0–1	28,860
43	1 September 2001	Poland – Norway	3–0	42,500
44	6 October 2001	Poland – Ukraine	1–1	20,900
45	29 March 2003	Poland – Hungary	0–0	42,200
46	10 September 2003	Poland – Sweden	0–2	18,500
47	8 September 2004	Poland – England	1–2	38,000
48	3 September 2005	Poland – Austria	3–2	40,000
49	31 May 2006	Poland – Colombia	1–2	40,000
50	11 October 2006	Poland – Portugal	2–1	38,199
51	17 November 2007	Poland – Belgium	2–0	41,450
52	1 June 2008	Poland – Denmark	1–1	35,000
53	11 October 2008	Poland – (Czech Republic) Czechia	2–1	38,293
54	5 September 2009	Poland – Northern Ireland	1–1	38,914
55	14 October 2009	Poland – Slovakia	0–1	4,500

===== After renovation =====
No.	Date	Match	Result	Turnout
1	27 March 2018	Poland – South Korea	3–2	53,129
2	11 October 2018	Poland – Portugal	2–3	48,783
3	14 October 2018	Poland – Italy	0–1	41,692
4	11 November 2020	Poland – Ukraine	2–0	0 (Note: The match was played without an audience due to pandemic restrictions due to the COVID-19 pandemic throughout Poland.)
5	18 November 2020	Poland – Netherlands	1–2	0
6	29 March 2022	Poland – Sweden	2–0	54,078
7	6 June 2025	Poland – Moldova	2–0	36,357
8	7 September 2025	Poland – Finland	3–1	50,897
9	9 October 2025	Poland – New Zealand	1–0	30,412

==== All-time results ====
As of match played 9 October 2025

Team	Played	Won	Drawn	Lost	GF	GA	GD
Poland	64	29	18	17	104	64	+40

==== Club football ====
Numerous Ekstraklasa matches have been played - mostly by the local team Ruch Chorzów, especially for the Great Silesian Derby matches against neighbours Górnik Zabrze due to extra interest from the fans. As it used to be the only national stadium with such a large capacity in the country for numerous years, Polish Cup matches have been frequently hosted there too, especially the final matches.

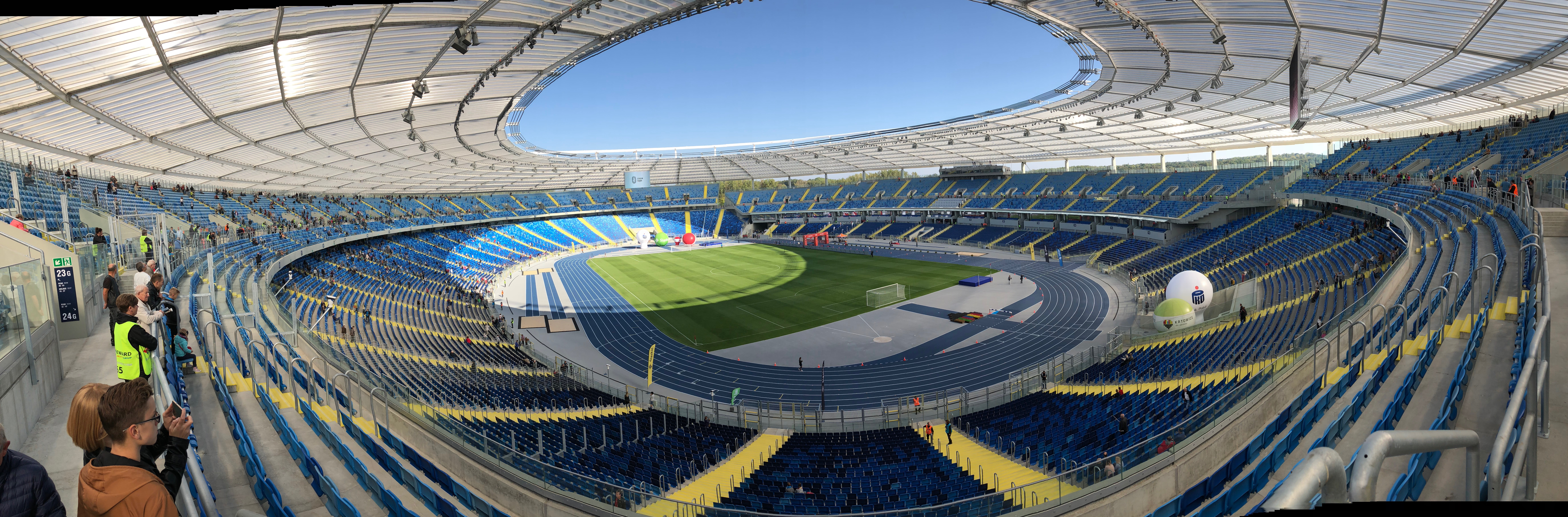
Panorama of the Silesian Stadium, 2017

==== Youth football ====
KS Stadion Śląski Chorzów is a youth football academy club, specializing in youth development.

=== Speedway ===
The football pitch at the Silesia Stadium used to be surrounded by a 384 metres (420 yards) long Motorcycle speedway track. The first World Final held at the stadium in 1973, was run in front of the largest crowd in world speedway history. English speedway 'golden boy' Peter Collins won the 1976 World Final at Silesian.

Ivan Mauger won the 1979 World Final at the stadium. Silesian also hosted the Final of the 1974 Speedway World Team Cup, won by England, as well as the Final of both the 1978 and 1981 World Pairs Championships.

The stadium hosted the final round of the Individual Speedway European Championship on 21 September 2024.

=== Track and field ===
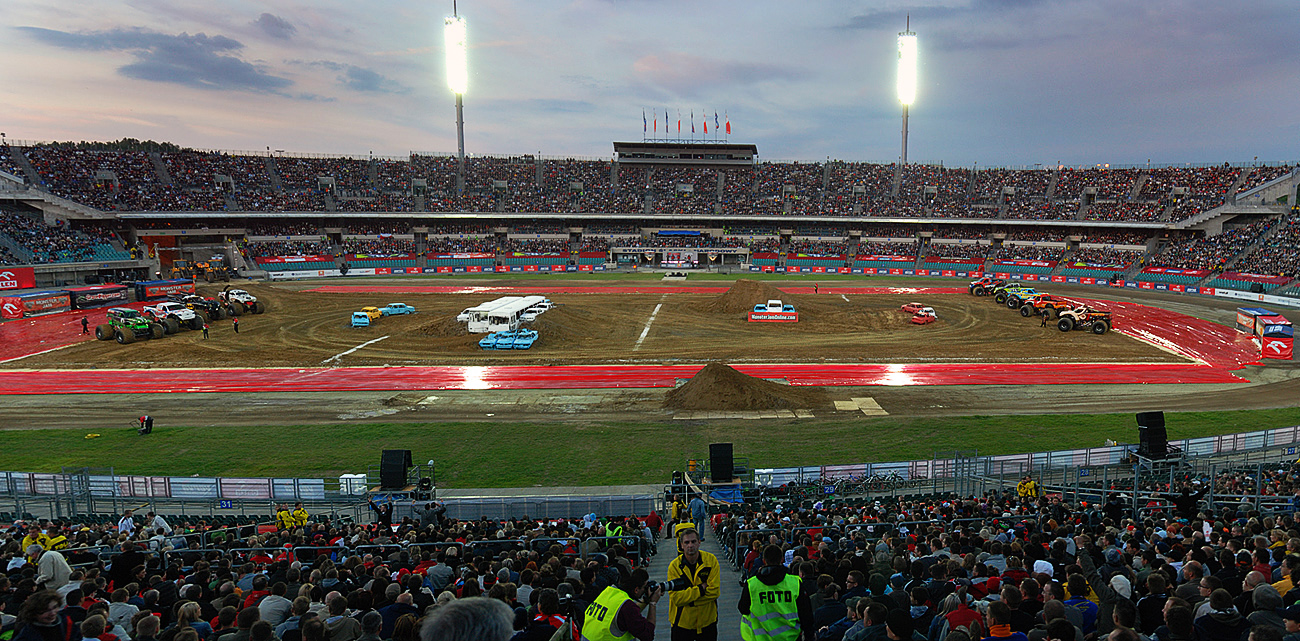
Orlen Monster Jam on Silesian Stadium before modernization

In 1967, the Silesian Stadium hosted the Polish Athletics Championships. In 1969, during an athletics tournament between Poland, East Germany and Soviet Union, Nadezhda Chizhova became the first woman in history to break the 20 metre barrier in shot put, setting the world record at 20.09m. In 2010, an official bid to organize the World Athletics Championships in Chorzów was submitted, however, the city lost to Beijing in the selection process.

Between 9–12 June 2018, the 11th Polish Summer Special Olympics Games took place at the Silesian Stadium. On 22 August 2018, the stadium was chosen to host the Kamila Skolimowska Memorial, which attracted 41,200 spectators.

In May 2021, Silesian Stadium hosted the 2021 World Athletics Relays and European Team Championships Super League.

=== Concerts and other events ===
Silesian Stadium has hosted large music concerts in its history by many artists and groups including The Rolling Stones, Metallica, Guns N' Roses, AC/DC, U2, Pearl Jam, Linkin Park, Iron Maiden, Red Hot Chili Peppers, Genesis, The Police, Behemoth, Rammstein, Slipknot, Machine Head.

In 2009, it was the venue of performances by Monster Jam, and again in 2018.

== See also ==
- Chorzów
- Silesian Park
- List of football stadiums in Poland
- Lists of stadiums
