= Nordic Speedway final =

Motorcycle speedway competition

The Nordic Championships was a Motorcycle speedway final sanctioned by the FIM. In 1952 it became a qualifying round for the Speedway World Championship. From 1995 to 2001 it was known as the Scandinavian final.

== Format ==
- To Continental final, 1953–1954
- To European final, 1955–1965, 1967, 1969, 1972
- To British Nordic final, 1966, 1968, 1970–1971, 1973–1974
- To Intercontinental final, 1975–1990, 1995–2001
- To World semi final, 1991–1994

== Winners ==
Year	Venue	Winner	Runner-up	3rd place
1948	(Denmark) Copenhagen	(Norway) Basse Hveem		
1949	(Denmark) Copenhagen	(Norway) Basse Hveem		
1950	(Finland) Helsinki	(Norway) Basse Hveem		
1951	(Denmark) Næstved	(Norway) Basse Hveem		
1952	(Norway) Oslo	(Norway) Basse Hveem	(Sweden) Bo Andersson	(Sweden) Rune Sörmander
1953	(Norway) Oslo	(Sweden) Dan Forsberg	(Norway) Basse Hveem	(Sweden) Olle Nygren
1954	(Norway) Oslo	(Sweden) Olle Nygren	(Sweden) Rune Sörmander	(Sweden) Georg Dunneborn
1955	(Norway) Trondheim	(Sweden) Ove Fundin	(Norway) Henry Andersen	(Norway) Basse Hveem
1956	(Sweden) Linköping	(Sweden) Dan Forsberg	(Sweden) Ulf Ericsson	(Sweden) Rune Sörmander
1957	(Norway) Oslo	(Norway) Aage Hansen	(Sweden) Per Olof Söderman	(Sweden) Rune Sörmander
1958	(Sweden) Växjö	(Sweden) Rune Sörmander	(Sweden) Ove Fundin	(Sweden) Olle Nygren
1959	(Finland) Turku	(Sweden) Rune Sörmander	(Norway) Aage Hansen	(Sweden) Arne Carlsson
1960	(Norway) Oslo	(Sweden) Olle Nygren	(Sweden) Göte Nordin	(Norway) Aage Hansen
1961	(Sweden) Gislaved	(Sweden) Ove Fundin	(Denmark) Arne Pander	(Sweden) Björn Knutson
1962	(Denmark) Hillerød	(Sweden) Björn Knutson	(Sweden) Göte Nordin	(Sweden) Ove Fundin
1963	(Sweden) Växjö	(Sweden) Ove Fundin	(Sweden) Björn Knutson	(Sweden) Göte Nordin
1964	(Denmark) Odense	(Sweden) Björn Knutson	(Sweden) Ove Fundin	(Sweden) Göte Nordin
1965	(Norway) Skien	(Sweden) Sören Sjösten	(Sweden) Ove Fundin	(Sweden) Leif Enecrona
1966	(Denmark) Hillerød	(Finland) Kalevi Lahtinen	(Denmark) Ole Olsen	(Norway) Sverre Harrfeldt
1967	(Denmark) Hillerød	(Sweden) Ove Fundin	(Norway) Sverre Harrfeldt	(Sweden) Leif Enecrona
1968	(Denmark) Hillerød	(Norway) Reidar Eide	(Norway) Øyvind S. Berg	(Norway) Odd Fossengen
1969	(Sweden) Linköping	(Sweden) Torbjörn Harrysson	(Sweden) Sören Sjösten	(Sweden) Ove Fundin
1970	(Sweden) Eskilstuna	(Sweden) Göte Nordin	(Sweden) Sören Sjösten	(Sweden) Anders Michanek
1971	(Denmark) Hillerød	(Denmark) Ole Olsen	(Norway) Reidar Eide	(Denmark) Bent Nørregaard-Jensen
1972	(Sweden) Norrköping	(Sweden) Bengt Jansson	(Sweden) Anders Michanek	(Denmark) Ole Olsen
1973	(Sweden) Norrköping	(Denmark) Ole Olsen	(Sweden) Bengt Jansson	(Sweden) Anders Michanek
1974	(Finland) Tampere	(Denmark) Ole Olsen	(Norway) Dag Lövaas	(Finland) Matti Olin
1975	(Norway) Skien	(Denmark) Ole Olsen	(Sweden) Tommy Jansson	(Norway) Dag Lövaas
1976	(Sweden) Norrköping	(Denmark) Ole Olsen	(Sweden) Anders Michanek	(Sweden) Bengt Jansson
1977	(Finland) Tampere	(Denmark) Ole Olsen	(Finland) Ila Teromaa	(Denmark) Finn Thomsen
1978	(Sweden) Norrköping	(Denmark) Ole Olsen	(Sweden) Bernt Persson	(Denmark) Finn Thomsen
1979	(Sweden) Norrköping	(Sweden) Jan Andersson	(Denmark) Hans Nielsen	(Denmark) Finn Thomsen
1980	(Norway) Skien	(Denmark) Hans Nielsen	(Denmark) Ole Olsen	(Denmark) Finn Thomsen
1981	(Sweden) Norrköping	(Denmark) Tommy Knudsen	(Denmark) Hans Nielsen	(Denmark) Ole Olsen
1982	(Denmark) Fjelsted	(Denmark) Hans Nielsen	(Denmark) Erik Gundersen	(Denmark) Bo Petersen
1983	(Norway) Elgane	(Denmark) Hans Nielsen	(Denmark) Erik Gundersen	(Denmark) Ole Olsen
1984	(Sweden) Norrköping	(Denmark) Hans Nielsen	(Denmark) Erik Gundersen	(Sweden) Mikael Blixt
1985	(Denmark) Fjelsted	(Denmark) Tommy Knudsen	(Sweden) Jan Andersson	(Denmark) Erik Gundersen
1986	(Sweden) Kumla	(Denmark) Hans Nielsen	(Sweden) Jimmy Nilsen	(Denmark) Jan O. Pedersen
1987	(Sweden) Norrköping	(Denmark) Erik Gundersen	(Denmark) Hans Nielsen	(Denmark) Peter Ravn
1988	(Norway) Sandnes	(Denmark) Hans Nielsen	(Denmark) Erik Gundersen	(Denmark) Jan O. Pedersen
1989	(Finland) Tampere	(Denmark) Hans Nielsen	(Denmark) Jan O. Pedersen	(Denmark) Erik Gundersen
1990	(Sweden) Linköping	(Denmark) Jan O. Pedersen	(Sweden) Per Jonsson	(Sweden) Henrik Gustafsson
1991	(Denmark) Brovst	(Denmark) Hans Nielsen	(Denmark) Jan O. Pedersen	(Sweden) Jimmy Nilsen
1992	(Norway) Elgane	(Sweden) Tony Rickardsson	(Sweden) Per Jonsson	(Denmark) Brian Karger
1993	(Finland) Seinäjoki	(Denmark) Tommy Knudsen	(Sweden) Per Jonsson	(Sweden) Tony Rickardsson
1994	(Sweden) Eskilstuna	(Denmark) Hans Nielsen	(Denmark) Tommy Knudsen	(Sweden) Tony Rickardsson
1995	(Denmark) Brovst	(Sweden) Stefan Andersson	(Sweden) Peter Karlsson	(Denmark) John Jørgensen
1996	(Norway) Elgane	(Sweden) Jimmy Nilsen	(Denmark) Brian Andersen	(Sweden) Mikael Karlsson
1997	(Finland) Hyvinkää	(Sweden) Peter Nahlin	(Denmark) Jesper B Jensen	(Sweden) Stefan Dannö
1998	(Sweden) Norrköping	(Denmark) John Jørgensen	(Sweden) Peter Karlsson	(Sweden) Mikael Karlsson
1999	(Denmark) Holsted	(Norway) Rune Holta	(Denmark) Jesper B Jensen	(Denmark) Gert Handberg
2000	(Norway) Elgane	(Norway) Rune Holta	(Norway) Lars Gunnestad	(Denmark) Nicki Pedersen
2001	(Finland) Pori	(Finland) Kai Laukkanen	(Sweden) Andreas Jonsson	(Sweden) Stefan Andersson

=== Medal classification ===
Rank	National Team	Gold	Silver	Bronze	Total
1.	Denmark	22	16	18	56
2.	Sweden	21	25	26	72
3.	Norway	9	8	5	22
4.	Finland	2	1	1	4

== See also ==
- Speedway World Championship
- Speedway Grand Prix
- Motorcycle speedway
