= 2024 Norwegian speedway season =

2024 season of motorcycle speedway in Norway

The 2024 Norwegian Speedway season is the 2024 season of motorcycle speedway in Norway. The season will run from early March to late October.

== Individual ==
=== Norwegian Individual Speedway Championship ===
The 2024 Norwegian Individual Speedway Championship is the 2024 version of Norwegian Individual Speedway Championship. Final of this event is scheduled to take place on 29 June in Kristiansand.

Pos.	Rider	Club	Total
1			
2			
3			
4			
5			
6			
7			
8			
9			
10			
11			
12			
13			
14			
15			
16			
17			
18			

== Pairs ==
=== Norwegian Pairs Speedway Championship ===
The 2024 Norwegian Pairs Speedway Championship is the 2024 version of Norwegian Pairs Speedway Championship. Final of this event is scheduled to take place on 25 May in Oslo.

== Team ==
=== Team Championship ===
The 2024 1. Divisjon is the 2024 edition of the Team Norwegian Championship to determine the gold medal winner (champion of Norway). Teams finishing second and third were awarded silver and bronze medals respectively.

=== 1. Divisjon ===
The 1. Divisjon season will run from 11 May to 18 August.

Pos	Team	P	#1	#2	#3	#4	Pts
1	Elgane MK						
2	NMK Kristiansand						
3	Oslo MK						
4	Grenland Speedway Skien						
5	Mjøsa SK						

==== Calendar ====
#	Date	Place	Winner	2nd place	3rd place	4th place	Notes
1	May 11	Elgane	Elgane MK (33 pts)	Oslo MK (32 pts)	NMK Kristiansand (20 pts)	Mjøsa SK (18 pts)	
2	May 12	Kristiansand	Oslo MK (34 pts)	Elgane MK (31 pts)	Grenland MSK (21 pts)	NMK Kristiansand (18 pts)	
3	June 15	Skien					
4	August 17	Mjøsa					
5	August 18	Oslo					

== Squads ==
Elgane MK

- (Norway) Glenn Moi
- (Norway) Tage Skretting
- (Norway) Tommy Thu
- (Norway) Geir Thoresen
- (Norway) Imre Vigre

NMK Kristiansand

- (Norway) Magnus Klipper
- (Norway) Lars Kristian Topstad
- (Norway) Jarle Køhn Skjæveland
- (Norway) Benjamin Emil Nielsen
- (Norway) Kim Andre Olsen
- (Sweden) Alexander Jacobsson Sundkvist

Oslo MK

- (Norway) Truls Kamhaug
- (Norway) Vetle Martinsen
- (Norway) Jarle Evensen
- (Norway) Benjamin Boo Nielsen
- (Denmark) Kenneth Jürgensen

Grenland Speedway Skien

- (Norway) Kenneth Klipper Smith
- (Norway) Jarle Skjæveland
- (Norway) Kim Olsen
- (Norway) Tomasz Fryza
- (Norway) Kim Andre Olsen
- (Norway) Bjørn-Olav Orndal
- (Norway) Yannick Hinz

Mjøsa SK

- (Norway) Emil Rindal
- (Norway) Lars Kristian Topstad
- (Norway) Rafael Evensen
- (Norway) Jørgen Lystad
- (Norway) Magnus Klipper
- (Norway) Bjørn-Olav Orndal
- (Sweden) Henrik Fernström
