= Norway national speedway team =

Norwegian national motorcycle speedway team

Norway
- SWC Wins: 0 World Pairs bronze (1968, 1991)

The Norway national speedway team are one of the teams that compete in international team motorcycle speedway.

== History ==
The Norwegian speedway team competed in the inaugural Speedway World Team Cup in 1960, finishing third in the Scandinavian round at Odense, Denmark. The team consisted of Aage Hansen, Rolf Mellerud, Nils Paulsen, Rolf Westerberg and Sverre Harrfeldt.

From 1960 to 1985, the team failed to qualify from their qualifying group during the World Cup, due to the fact that they were drawn together in qualifying with two of the world's strongest speedway nations, Denmark and Sweden. They did however win a bronze medal at the 1968 Speedway World Pairs Championship.

The World Team Cup system changed in 1986 but it was not until the 1991 Speedway World Team Cup that the team progressed from qualifying to round two. During the same year of 1991, the team equalled their greatest feat, when winning a bronze medal at the 1991 Speedway World Pairs Championship.

The nation reached their first and only World Cup final to date in 1995. In recent years, the nation has failed to qualify for the World Cup but did compete in the semi finals of the 2022 Speedway of Nations and reached the 2022 European Pairs Speedway Championship final.

== Major tournament finals ==
=== World Team Championships ===
Year	Venue	Standings (Pts)	Riders	Pts
1995	(Poland); Göteborg; Polonia Bydgoszcz Stadium	1. Denmark (28); 2. (England) Great Britain (22); 3. United States (19); 4. Sweden (19); 5. Australia (14); 6. Poland (13); 7. Norway (11)	Lars Gunnestad	8
1995	(Poland); Göteborg; Polonia Bydgoszcz Stadium	1. Denmark (28); 2. (England) Great Britain (22); 3. United States (19); 4. Sweden (19); 5. Australia (14); 6. Poland (13); 7. Norway (11)	Rune Holta	3
1995	(Poland); Göteborg; Polonia Bydgoszcz Stadium	1. Denmark (28); 2. (England) Great Britain (22); 3. United States (19); 4. Sweden (19); 5. Australia (14); 6. Poland (13); 7. Norway (11)	Arnt Førland	0

=== World Pairs Championship ===
Year	Venue	Standings (Pts)	Riders	Pts
1968	(West Germany); Kempten; Kempten Speedway	1. Sweden (24); 2. (United Kingdom) Great Britain (12); 3. Norway (16); 4. West Germany B (12); 5. West Germany A (10); 6. Denmark (6)	Odd Fossengen	11
1968	(West Germany); Kempten; Kempten Speedway	1. Sweden (24); 2. (United Kingdom) Great Britain (12); 3. Norway (16); 4. West Germany B (12); 5. West Germany A (10); 6. Denmark (6)	Øyvind S. Berg	5
1973	(Sweden); Borås; Ryavallen	1. Sweden (24); 2. Denmark (21); 3. Poland (21); 4. Soviet Union (20); 5. Norway (17); 6. Czechoslovakia (11); 7. New Zealand (10)	Reidar Eide	9
1973	(Sweden); Borås; Ryavallen	1. Sweden (24); 2. Denmark (21); 3. Poland (21); 4. Soviet Union (20); 5. Norway (17); 6. Czechoslovakia (11); 7. New Zealand (10)	Dag Lövaas	8
1991	(Poland); Poznań; Olimpia Poznań Stadium	1. Denmark (28); 2. Sweden (24); 3. Norway (19); 4. Germany (18); 5. Czech Republic (18); 6. Italy (10); 7. Poland (9)	Lars Gunnestad	11
1991	(Poland); Poznań; Olimpia Poznań Stadium	1. Denmark (28); 2. Sweden (24); 3. Norway (19); 4. Germany (18); 5. Czech Republic (18); 6. Italy (10); 7. Poland (9)	Einar Kyllingstad	8
1991	(Poland); Poznań; Olimpia Poznań Stadium	1. Denmark (28); 2. Sweden (24); 3. Norway (19); 4. Germany (18); 5. Czech Republic (18); 6. Italy (10); 7. Poland (9)	Tor Einar Hielm	-

=== European Pairs Championships ===
Year	Venue	Standings (Pts)	Riders	Pts
2022	(Denmark); Slangerup; Slangerup Speedway Center	1. Denmark (26); 2. Czech Republic (23); 3. Poland (21); 4. Sweden (18); 5. Latvia (17); 6. (United Kingdom) Great Britain (15); 7. Norway (6)	Truls Kamhaug	3
2022	(Denmark); Slangerup; Slangerup Speedway Center	1. Denmark (26); 2. Czech Republic (23); 3. Poland (21); 4. Sweden (18); 5. Latvia (17); 6. (United Kingdom) Great Britain (15); 7. Norway (6)	Lasse Fredriksen	3
2022	(Denmark); Slangerup; Slangerup Speedway Center	1. Denmark (26); 2. Czech Republic (23); 3. Poland (21); 4. Sweden (18); 5. Latvia (17); 6. (United Kingdom) Great Britain (15); 7. Norway (6)	Glenn Moi	1

== International caps (as of 2022) ==
Since the advent of the Speedway Grand Prix era, international caps earned by riders is largely restricted to international competitions, whereas previously test matches between two teams were a regular occurrence. This means that the number of caps earned by a rider has decreased in the modern era.

Rider	Caps
Andersen, Henry	
Berg, Øyvind S.	14
Egedius, Einar	2
Eide, Reidar	17
Faafeng, Jonny	2
Arnt Førland, Arnt	
Fossengen, Odd	8
Gimre, Kjell	1
Godal, Tom	2
Gramstad, Rolf	5
Gravningen, Jan Terje	5
Gunnestad, Lars	22
Hansen, Aage	22
Hansen, Bjorn	4
Hansen, Per Arne	1
Haarfeldt, Henry	1
Haarfeldt, Sverre	7
Haugvalstad, Jorn	2
Holta, Rune	
Hveem, Basse	11
Kaasa, Svein	5
Kamhaug, Truls	
Kyllingstad, Einar	16
Langli, Helge	4
Langli, Tormod	7
Lövaas, Dag	9
Lövaas, Ulf	6
Ødegaard, Jon	3
Olsen, Audun Ove	6
Paulsen, Nils	12
Pedersen, Sigvart	3
Pedersen, Stein Roar	1
Skretting, Trond Helge	3
Stangeland, Edgar	10

== See also ==
- Speedway Grand Prix of Norway
- motorcycle speedway
