= 1991 Speedway World Team Cup =

32nd edition of the annual motorcycle speedway World Cup competition

Seasons
- ← 1990 1992 →

The 1991 Speedway World Team Cup was the 32nd edition of the FIM Speedway World Team Cup to determine the team world champions.

The final was staged at Vojens Speedway Center, Denmark and the host nation Denmark won a ninth title, once again drawing level with England's record. It was also Hans Nielsen's ninth gold medal having taken part in all of Denmark's title wins from 1978 until 1991.

== First round ==
- 22 April 1991
- (Germany) Motodrom am Cottaweg, Leipzig

1st	2nd	3rd
Netherlands - 29; Robert Jan Munnecom - 14; Rene Elzinga - 6 Rob Steman - 5 Ron Koppe - 4	Yugoslavia - 28; Gregor Pintar - 16; Gerhard Lekse - 9 Krešo Omerzel - 3	East Germany - 27; Thomas Diehr - 15; Thomsen Hopp - 10; Herbert Mussehl - 1 Thomas Koch - 1

4th	5th
France - 18; Christophe Dubernard - 11; David Ochocki - 7 Christian Ianotto - 0	Bulgaria - 16; Zdravko Iordanov - 9 Nikolai Manev - 7

- 28 April 1991
- (Socialist Federal Republic of Yugoslavia) Matija Gubec Stadium, Krško

1st	2nd	3rd
Yugoslavia - 33; Gregor Pintar - 15; Krešo Omerzel - 12; Gerhard Lekse - 6	Bulgaria - 27; Georgy Petranov - 12; Zdravko Iordanov - 9 Nikolai Manev - 6	East Germany - 22; Thomas Diehr - 11; Herbert Mussehl - 6 Roland Sass - 5

4th	5th
Netherlands - 19; Rene Elzinga - 8 Ron Koppe - 8 Robert Jan Munnecom - 3	France - 19; David Ochocki - 11; Christophe Dubernard - 7 Christian Ianotto - 1

Yugoslavia to second round.

== Second round ==
- 19 May 1991
- (Italy) Santa Marina Stadium, Lonigo

1st	2nd	3rd
Italy - 31; Armando Castagna (2,2,3,1,2,3) - 13; Valentino Furlanetto (2,3,2,3) - 10; Armando Dal Chiele (1,1,3,2,1,0) - 8	Norway - 28; Lars Gunnestad (3,3,3,3,3,3) - 18; Einar Kyllingstad (x,3,2,2,1,x) - 8 Tor Einar Hielm (1,0,x,1) - 2	Austria - 26; Franz Leitner (3,2,2,3,1,2) - 13; Andreas Bossner (3,1,1,3,0,1) - 9 Heinrich Schatzer (0,1,1,2) - 4

4th	5th
Poland - 25; Piotr Świst (3,2,2,2,2,3) - 14; Tomasz Gollob (1,1,0,1,3,2) - 8 Dariusz Śledź (1,2,0,0) - 3	Yugoslavia - 9 Krešo Omerzel (2,x,0,3,2) - 7 Gregor Pintar (0,0,1,1,x,0) - 2 Gerhard Lekse (0,0,0,0,e,0) - 0

- 26 May 1991
- (Poland) Tarnów Speedway Stadium, Tarnów

1st	2nd	3rd
Norway - 36; Lars Gunnestad - 16; Einar Kyllingstad - 14; Tor Einar Hielm - 2	Poland - 30; Piotr Świst - 14; Tomasz Gollob- 11; Jacek Rempala - 5	Italy - 26; Armando Dal Chiele - 12; Armando Castagna - 9 Valentino Furlanetto - 5

4th	5th
Austria - 17; Andreas Bossner - 9 Heinrich Schatzer - 5 Franz Leitner - 3	Yugoslavia - 10; Gregor Pintar - 5 Gerhard Lekse - 5 Krešo Omerzel - 0

Norway to third round.

== Third round ==
- 7 July 1991
- (Germany) Rhein-Main Arena, Diedenbergen

1st	2nd	3rd	4th
Hungary - 38; Zoltán Hajdú (3,2,3,0,0) - 8 Zoltán Adorján (3,2,3,1,2) - 11; József Petrikovics (2,0,3,2,3) - 10; Róbert Nagy (2,0,-,-,1) - 3 Sándor Tihanyi (-,-,3,3,-) - 6	Germany - 33; Klaus Lausch (3,3,1,3,0) - 10; Gerd Riss (3,1,2,3,2) - 11; Tommy Dunker (1,3,0,2,2) - 8 Robert Barth (2,0,2,-,-) - 4 Andre Pollehn (-,-,-,e,e,) - 0	Norway - 28; Lars Gunnestad (2,3,3,2,3) - 13; Einar Kyllingstad (1,1,1,0,1) - 4 Tor Einar Hielm (0,1,2,3,1) - 7 Arnt Førland (0,1,1,1,1) - 4	Finland - 21; Vesa Ylinen (1,3,2,1,1) - 8 Juha Moksunen (1,0,2,t,-) - 3 Olli Tyrväinen (e,-,2,e,-) - 2 Tomi Havu (0,0,-,0,-) - 0 Mika Pellinen (2,2,0,1,3) - 8

- 14 July 1991
- (Hungary) Gázvezeték Street Sports Complex, Debrecen

Placing	Team / Rider name	Total	1	2	3	4	5	6	7	8	9	10	11	12	13	14	15	16	Pts	17	18	19	20
1	Hungary	53	2	5	8	10	13	16	19	22	25	28	31	33	36	39	42	44		46	49	51	53
1	(9) Zoltán Adorján	14			3		3					3						2	11		3
1	(10) Zoltán Hajdú	10				2		3			3						-		8				2
1	(11) József Petrikovics	14		3						3			3			3			12	2
1	(12) Sándor Tihanyi	10	2						3					-	3				8			2
1	(19) Róbert Nagy	5												2			3		5
2	Germany	27	3	4	6	6	8	9	9	10	12	12	14	15	16	16	18	18		19	21	24	27
2	(5) Klaus Lausch	7	3					1					2					0	6	1
2	(6) Gerd Riss	9		1			2							1			2		6			3
2	(7) Robert Barth	3				0			0			-				-			0				3
2	(8) Andre Pollehn	8			2					1	2				1				6		2
2	(18) Peter Schroeck	0										E				E			0
4	Norway	26	0	0	1	4	4	6	8	10	10	12	13	16	18	20	21	24		24	24	25	26
4	(1) Lars Gunnestad	11				3				2				3				3	11		E
4	(2) Einar Kyllingstad	6			1				2				1				1		5				1
4	(3) Tor Einar Hielm	6		0				2				2			2				6	0
4	(4) Arnt Førland	3	0				0				-					2			2			1
4	(17) Odd Pettersen	0									0								0
4	Finland	14	1	3	3	4	5	5	6	6	7	8	8	8	8	9	9	10		13	14	14	14
4	(13) Vesa Ylinen	8		2					1		1							1	5	3
4	(14) Juha Moksunen	1	1							E		-					0		1			0
4	(15) Janne Moksunen	0			0			E						-		-			0				0
4	(16) Tomi Havu	3				1	1						0		0				2		1
4	(20) Mika Pellinen	2										1		0		1			2
Placing	Team / Rider name	Total	1	2	3	4	5	6	7	8	9	10	11	12	13	14	15	16	Pts	17	18	19	20

M - exclusion for exceeding two-minute time allowance • T - exclusion for touching the tapes • X - other exclusion • E - retired or mechanical failure • F - fell

Helmet colours were permanent for each team (Red, Blue, White and Yellow/Black). Colours in diagrams indicate gate positions:
gate A – inside	gate B	gate C	gate D – outside

Hungary to fourth round.

== Fourth round ==
- 24 August 1991
- (Czechoslovakia) Svítkov Stadium, Pardubice

Placing	Team / Rider name	Total	1	2	3	4	5	6	7	8	9	10	11	12	13	14	15	16	Pts	17	18	19	20
1	Sweden	49	3	5	8	11	14	17	20	22	25	28	28	31	32	32	35	38		40	43	46	49
1	(9) Henrik Gustafsson	15			3		3					3						3	12			3
1	(10) Per Jonsson	15				3		3			3						3		12				3
1	(11) Tony Rickardsson	6		2						2			0			-			4	2
1	(12) Jimmy Nilsen	13	3						3					3	1				10		3
1	(19) Peter Nahlin	0														0			0
2	Australia	35	2	5	7	8	9	10	12	15	17	18	19	21	24	27	28	29		32	34	34	35
2	(1) Leigh Adams	4				1				-				2				1	4		-
2	(2) Shane Bowes	6			2				2				1				1		6			0
2	(3) Troy Butler	5		-				1				1			-				2	3
2	(4) Craig Hodgson	9	2				1				2					3			8				1
2	(17) Steve Regeling	11		3						3					3				9		2
4	Czechoslovakia	21	0	1	2	4	4	6	7	8	9	11	14	15	15	17	17	17		18	19	21	21
4	(5) Zdeněk Tesař	7	0					2					3					0	5			2
4	(6) Antonín Kasper Jr.	3		1			0							1			-		2	1
4	(7) Václav Milík Sr.	7				2			1			2				2			7				0
4	(8) Petr Vandírek	4			1					1	1				0				3		1
4	(18) Vladimír Kalina	0															0		0
4	Hungary	15	1	1	1	1	3	3	3	3	3	3	5	5	7	8	10	12		12	12	13	15
4	(13) Zoltán Adorján	3		0					0		0							2	2			1
4	(14) Zoltán Hajdú	1	1							0		0					-		1		0
4	(15) József Petrikovics	1			0			0						-		1			1	-
4	(16) Sándor Tihanyi	8				0	2						2		2				6				2
4	(20) Antal Kocso	2												0			2		2	0
Placing	Team / Rider name	Total	1	2	3	4	5	6	7	8	9	10	11	12	13	14	15	16	Pts	17	18	19	20

M - exclusion for exceeding two-minute time allowance • T - exclusion for touching the tapes • X - other exclusion • E - retired or mechanical failure • F - fell

Helmet colours were permanent for each team (Red, Blue, White and Yellow/Black). Colours in diagrams indicate gate positions:
gate A – inside	gate B	gate C	gate D – outside

Sweden to World final.

== World final ==
- 14 September 1991
- (Denmark) Speedway Center, Vojens

Placing	Team / Rider name	Total	1	2	3	4	5	6	7	8	9	10	11	12	13	14	15	16	Pts	17	18	19	20
1	Denmark	51	3	6	9	12	15	18	20	23	26	28	31	32	34	37	40	43		44	47	48	51
1	(9) Hans Nielsen	14			3		3					2						3	11		3
1	(10) Jan O. Pedersen	15				3		3			3						3		12				3
1	(11) Tommy Knudsen	13		3						3			3			3			12			1
1	(12) Gert Handberg	8	3						2					1	2				8	-
1	(19) Peter Nahlin	1																	0	1
2	Sweden	30	0	1	2	4	5	6	7	9	11	11	12	15	18	19	21	22		25	27	29	30
2	(1) Per Jonsson	9				2				2				3				1	8				1
2	(2) Tony Rickardsson	7			1				1				1				2		5			2
2	(3) Henrik Gustafsson	7		1				1				0			3				5		2
2	(4) Jimmy Nilsen	7	0				1				2					1			4	3
2	(17) Peter Nahlin	0																	0
4	United States	28	2	4	4	4	6	8	11	11	12	15	17	19	20	20	21	21		23	23	26	28
4	(5) Sam Ermolenko	9	2					2					2					0	6			3
4	(6) Billy Hamill	9		2			2							2			1		7				2
4	(7) Greg Hancock	6				0			3			3				0			6		0
4	(8) Ronnie Correy	0			0					0	-				-				0	-
4	(18) Rick Miller	4									1				1				2	2
4	England	11	1	1	3	4	4	4	4	5	5	6	6	6	6	8	8	10		10	11	11	11
4	(13) Marvyn Cox	3		0					0		-							2	2		1
4	(14) Gary Havelock	3	1							1		1					0		3			0
4	(15) Martin Dugard	4			2			0						0		2			4				0
4	(16) Chris Louis	1				1	0						0		-				1	0
4	(20) Paul Thorp	0									0				0				0
Placing	Team / Rider name	Total	1	2	3	4	5	6	7	8	9	10	11	12	13	14	15	16	Pts	17	18	19	20

M - exclusion for exceeding two-minute time allowance • T - exclusion for touching the tapes • X - other exclusion • E - retired or mechanical failure • F - fell

Helmet colours were permanent for each team (Red, Blue, White and Yellow/Black). Colours in diagrams indicate gate positions:
gate A – inside	gate B	gate C	gate D – outside

== See also ==
- 1991 Individual Speedway World Championship
- 1991 Speedway World Pairs Championship
