= Lova =

Lova may refer to:

- 868 Lova, a main-belt asteroid
- Chevrolet Lova (disambiguation), subcompact automobiles
- Lova Adrien Marie Rakotoniaina, a Malagasy politician
- Lova Boy, a recording artist and entrepreneur from Belize
- Lova Ladiva, French drag queen
- Lova Lova an album from the French pop group Superbus
- Lova Lundin (born 29 October 1998) is a Swedish footballer
- Lova Marline, Malagasy bryologist
- Lova Moor (Marie-Claude Jourdain; born 1946), a French dancer and singer

== See also ==
- Lovas (disambiguation)
- Ole Ivar Lovaas (1927–2010), Norwegian-American clinical psychologist
