= Norwegian Individual Speedway Championship =

National speedway competition

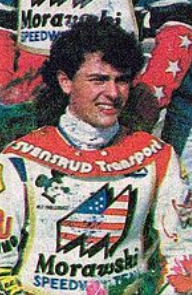
- Sport: Motorcycle speedway
- Founded: 1938
- Most titles: Lars Gunnestad (pictured above) (10 wins)

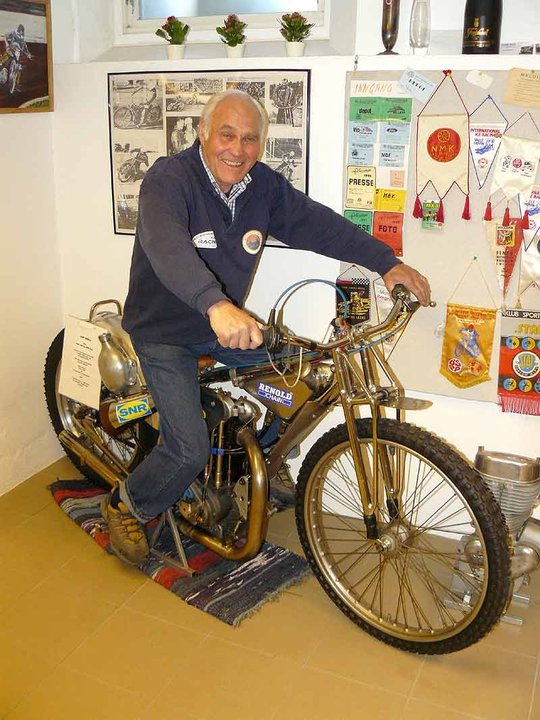
Aage Hansen, seven times champion, pictured in 2010

The Individual Speedway Norwegian Championship is an annual speedway event held each year organised by the Norges Motorsportforbund (NMF). The first championship was held in 1938 in Trondheim and saw Ragnar C. Erichsen as winner.

== History ==
Lars Gunnestad has won the highest number of championships with ten victories between 1988 and 2003.

The final of the Norwegian Championship regularly doubled up as the Norwegian qualification round for the Speedway World Championship from 1952 until 1975.

If the Norwegian final was held in the Summer months, the qualification would be for the following year's World Championship.

== Key ==
Unless stated all riders are Norwegian.

== Past winners ==
The list is incomplete

| Year | Venue | Winners | 2nd place | 3rd place |
| 1938 | Leangen Travbane, Trondheim | Ragnar C. Erichsen; NMK Oslo | Leiv Samsing; NMK Oslo | Harald Wiik Hansen; NMK Oslo |
| 1939 | Hamar Idrettsplassen, Hamar | Sverre Gjølmesli; NMK Trondheim | Alf Kristian Hjort | Basse Hveem |
| 1940 | Oslo | Basse Hveem; NMK Oslo | Harald Wiik Hansen; NMK Oslo | Leiv Samsing; NMK Oslo |
1941-1945, no championship held due to World War II
| 1946 | Tempebanen, Trondheim | Leiv Samsing; NMK Oslo | Harald Wiik Hansen; NMK Oslo | Edvin Fredriksen; NMK Drammen |
| 1947 | Lisleby Speedway, Fredrikstad | Basse Hveem; NMK Oslo | Henry Andersen; NMK Oslo | Sverre Gjølmesli; NMK Trondheim |
| 1948 | Dælenenga idrettspark, Oslo | Basse Hveem; NMK Oslo | Leiv Samsing; NMK Oslo | Werner "Gnomen" Lorentzen; NMK Oslo |
| 1949 | Jessheim Speedway Stadion, Jessheim | Basse Hveem; NMK Oslo | Thorleif Andreassen; NMK Oslo | Odd Samsing; NMK Oslo |
| 1950 | Tønsberg Stadion, Tønsberg | Henry Andersen; NMK Oslo | Basse Hveem; NMK Oslo | Sverre Gjølmesli; NMK Trondheim |
| 1951 | Sandnes Idrettspark, Sandnes | Basse Hveem; NMK Oslo | Henry Andersen; NMK Oslo | Werner "Gnomen" Lorentzen; NMK Oslo |
| 1952 | Lerkendal Stadion, Trondheim | Basse Hveem; NMK Oslo | Henry Andersen; NMK Oslo | Reidar Kristoffersen; NMK Oslo |
| 1953 | Lerkendal Stadion, Trondheim | Basse Hveem; NMK Oslo | Reidar Kristoffersen; NMK Oslo | Sverre Gjølmesli; NMK Trondheim |
| 1954 | Briskebyen Utstillingsplassen, Hamar | Reidar Kristoffersen; NMK Oslo | Rolf Westerberg; NMK Oslo | Nils Paulsen; NMK Romerike |
1955, cancelled due to bad weather, Lillehammer
| 1956 | Geiteryggen Speedwaybane, Skien | Aage Hansen; NMK Oslo | Rolf Westerberg; NMK Oslo | Reidar Kristoffersen; NMK Oslo |
| 1957 | Tønsberg Stadion, Tønsberg | Aage Hansen; NMK Oslo | Reidar Kristoffersen; NMK Oslo | Fred Roger Steen; Jørstadmoen |
| 1958 | Dælenenga idrettspark, Oslo | Aage Hansen; NMK Oslo | Nils Paulsen; NMK Oslo | Reidar Kristoffersen; NMK Oslo |
| 1959 | Geiteryggen Speedwaybane, Skien | Aage Hansen; NMK Oslo | Rolf Westerberg; NMK Oslo | Torbjørn Nygaard; NMK Grenland |
| 1960 | Idda Idrettsplassen, Kristiansand | Aage Hansen; NMK Romerike | Øystein Mellerud; NMK Oslo | Sverre Harrfeldt; NMK Oslo |
| 1961 | Krohnsminde Stadion, Bergen | Aage Hansen; NMK Oslo | Sverre Harrfeldt; NMK Oslo | Reidar Kristoffersen; NMK Oslo |
| 1962 | Marienlyst Stadion, Drammen | Sverre Harrfeldt; NMK Oslo | Aage Hansen; NMK Oslo | Jon Ødegaard; NMK Sandnes & Jæren |
| 1963 | Kadettangen, Sandvika | Aage Hansen; NMK Oslo | Sverre Harrfeldt; Asker & Bærum | Nils Paulsen; NMK Oslo |
| 1964 | Kadettangen, Sandvika | Sverre Harrfeldt; NMK Oslo | Nils Paulsen; NMK Oslo | Per J. Aulie; NMK Oslo |
| 1965 | Dælenenga idrettspark, Oslo | Sverre Harrfeldt; NMK Oslo | Per J. Aulie; NMK Oslo | Johnny Faafeng; NMK Kristiansand |
| 1966 | Krohnsminde Stadion, Bergen | Sverre Harrfeldt; NMK Oslo | Reidar Eide; NMK Sandnes og Jæren | Per J. Aulie; NMK Oslo |
| 1967 | Sandnes Idrettspark, Sandnes | Reidar Eide; NMK Stavanger | Øyvind S. Berg; NMK Oslo | Odd Fossengen; NMK Oslo |
| 1968 | Kongsberg Idrettsparken, Kongsberg | Reidar Eide; NMK Stavanger | Øyvind S. Berg; NMK Oslo | Per J. Aulie; NMK Oslo |
| 1969 | Krohnsminde Stadion, Bergen | Reidar Eide; NMK Stavanger | Øyvind S. Berg; NMK Oslo | Edgar Stangeland; NMK Sandnes & Jæren |
| 1970 | Geiteryggen Speedwaybane, Skien | Reidar Eide; NMK Stavanger | Ulf Lövaas; NMK Tønsberg | Svein Kaasa; NMK Grenland |
| 1971 | Sandnes Idrettspark, Sandnes | Reidar Eide; NMK Stavanger | Dag Lövaas; NMK Tønsberg | Svein Kaasa; NMK Grenland |
| 1972 | Gamle Stadion, Sandefjord | Ulf Lövaas; NMK Tønsberg | Dag Lövaas; NMK Tønsberg | Odd Fossengen; NMK Oslo |
| 1973 | Geiteryggen Speedwaybane, Skien | Dag Lövaas; NMK Tønsberg | Edgar Stangeland; NMK Sandnes & Jæren | Kjell Gimre; NMK Sandnes & Jæren |
| 1974 | Idrettslunden, Nærbø | Dag Lövaas; NMK Tønsberg | Edgar Stangeland; NMK Sandnes & Jæren | Ulf Lövaas; NMK Tønsberg |
| 1975 | Geiteryggen Speedwaybane, Skien | Jan Terje Gravningen; NMK Kongsberg | Helge Langli; NMK Grenland | Audun Ove Olsen; NMK Sandnes & Jæren |
| 1976 | Idrettslunden, Nærbø | Edgar Stangeland; NMK Sandnes & Jæren | Øyvind S. Berg; NMK Oslo | Helge Langli; NMK Grenland |
| 1977 | Geiteryggen Speedwaybane, Skien | Audun Ove Olsen; NMK Sandnes & Jæren | Øyvind S. Berg; NMK Oslo | Stein Roar Pedersen; NMK Sandnes & Jæren |
| 1978 | Idrettslunden, Nærbø | Kjell Gimre; NMK Sandnes & Jæren | Audun Ove Olsen; NMK Sandnes & Jæren | Trond Helge Skretting; NMK Sandnes & Jæren |
| 1979 | Geiteryggen Speedwaybane, Skien | Audun Ove Olsen; NMK Sandnes & Jæren | Jørn Haugvaldstad; NMK Sandnes & Jæren | Toralf Holen; NMK Grenland |
| 1980 | Idrettslunden, Nærbø | Dag Håland; NMK Sandnes & Jæren | Geir Aasland; NMK Sandnes & Jæren | Toralf Holen; NMK Grenland |
| 1981 | Geiteryggen Speedwaybane, Skien | Audun Ove Olsen; NMK Sandnes & Jæren | Dag Håland; NMK Sandnes & Jæren | Geir Aasland; NMK Sandnes & Jæren |
| 1982 | Elgane, Varhaug | Trond Helge Skretting; NMK Sandnes & Jæren | Geir Aasland; NMK Sandnes & Jæren | Sigvart Pedersen; NMK Sarpsborg |
| 1983 | Geiteryggen Speedwaybane, Skien | Dag Håland; NMK Sandnes & Jæren | Roy Otto; Elgane MK | Tormod Langli; NMK Grenland |
| 1984 | Elgane, Varhaug | Einar Kyllingstad; NMK Sandnes & Jæren | Tormod Langli; NMK Grenland | Kurt Ueland; NMK Sandnes & Jæren |
| 1985 | Frogner stadion, Oslo | Einar Kyllingstad; NMK Sandnes & Jæren | Ingvar Skogland; NMK Sandnes & Jæren | Roy Otto; NMK Sandnes & Jæren |
| 1986 | Geiteryggen Speedwaybane, Skien | Arne Svendsen; NMK Oslo | Arnt Førland; NMK Sarpsborg | Robert Langeland; NMK Drammen |
| 1987 | Elgane, Varhaug | Tor Einar Hielm; NMK Sandnes & Jæren | Arnt Førland; NMK Sarpsborg | Jan Arild Slatta; NMK Drammen |
| 1988 | Vinsvollbanen, Hokksund | Lars Gunnestad; NMK Drammen | Tor Einar Hielm; NMK Sandnes & Jæren | Arnt Førland; NMK Oslo |
| 1989 | Frogner stadion, Oslo | Arnt Førland; NMK Oslo | Lars Gunnestad; NMK Drammen | Robert Langeland; NMK Drammen |
| 1990 | Elgane, Varhaug | Lars Gunnestad; NMK Drammen | Kjell Øyvind Sola; Elgane MK | Willy Tjessem; NMK Stavanger |
| 1991 | Geiteryggen Speedwaybane, Skien | Lars Gunnestad; NMK Drammen | Einar Kyllingstad; NMK Sandnes & Jæren | Rune Holta; NMK Sandnes & Jæren |
| 1992 | Elgane, Varhaug | Lars Gunnestad; NMK Drammen | Arnt Førland; NMK Oslo | Rune Holta; NMK Sandnes & Jæren |
| 1993 | Geiteryggen Speedwaybane, Skien | Lars Gunnestad; NMK Drammen | Einar Kyllingstad; NMK Sandnes & Jæren | Rune Holta; NMK Sandnes & Jæren |
| 1994 | Riska Speedway, Hommersåk | Rune Holta; NMK Sandnes & Jæren | Arnt Førland; NMK Oslo | Tor Einar Hielm; Riska MK |
| 1995 | Vinsvollbanen, Hokksund | Lars Gunnestad; NMK Drammen | Rune Holta; NMK Sandnes & Jæren | Arnt Førland; NMK Oslo |
| 1996 | Series of 4 rounds (Riska, Rudskogen, Geiteryggen, Elgane) | Rune Holta; NMK Sandnes & Jæren | Trygve Jensen; NMK Sandnes & Jæren | Kjell H. Tønnessen; Riska MSK |
| 1997 | Series of 3 rounds (Konnerud, Elgane, Basserudåsen) | Rune Holta; NMK Sandnes & Jæren | Bernt Enge Larsen; NMK Oslo | Kenneth Borgenhaug; NMK Drammen |
| 1998 | Series of 4 rounds (Riska, Elgane, Basserudåsen, Lunner) | Lars Gunnestad; NMK Drammen | Kjell H. Tønnessen; Riska MK | Kenneth Borgenhaug; NMK Drammen |
| 1999 | Elgane, Varhaug | Lars Gunnestad; NMK Drammen | Rune Holta; NMK Sandnes & Jæren | Bjørn G. Hansen; NMK Drammen |
| 2000 | Lunner, Oslo | Rune Holta; NMK Sandnes & Jæren | Lars Gunnestad; NMK Drammen | Kjell H. Tønnessen; Riska MK |
| 2001 | Elgane, Varhaug | Lars Gunnestad; NMK Drammen | Rune Holta; NMK Sandnes & Jæren | Bjørn G. Hansen; NMK Drammen |
| 2002 | Elgane, Varhaug | Mikke Bjerk; MSK Riska | Rune Sola; Riska MK | Bjørn G. Hansen; NMK Oslo |
| 2003 | Basserudåsen, Kongsberg | Lars Gunnestad; NMK Drammen | Bjørn G. Hansen; NMK Oslo | Marius Røkeberg; NMK Drammen |
| 2004 | Riska Speedway, Hommersåk | Arnt Førland; Elgane MK | Rune Sola; Riska MK | Mikke Bjerk; Elgane MK |
| 2005 | Vinsvollbanen, Hokksund | Arnt Førland; Elgane MK | Mikke Bjerk; Elgane MK | Marius Røkeberg; NMK Drammen |
| 2006 | Elgane, Varhaug | Rune Sola; Riska MK | Mikke Bjerk; Elgane MK | Carl Johan Raugstad; Riska MK |
| 2007 | Geiteryggen Speedwaybane, Skien | Rune Sola; Riska MSK | Carl Johan Raugstad; Riska MSK | Marius Røkeberg; NMK Drammen |
| 2008 | Elgane, Varhaug | Rune Sola; Riska MSK | Carl Johan Raugstad; Riska MSK | Mikke Bjerk; Elgane MK |
| 2009 | Lunner, Oslo | Rune Sola; Riska MK | Henrik Bauer Hansen; Oslo MK | Inge Bjerk; Elgane MK |
| 2010 | Riska Speedway, Hommersåk | Rune Sola; Riska MSK | Carl Johan Raugstad; Riska MSK | Lars Daniel Gunnestad; NMK Drammen |
| 2011 | Vinsvollbanen, Hokksund | Lars Daniel Gunnestad; NMK Drammen | Thomas Gunnestad; NMK Drammen | Mikke Bjerk; Elgane MK |
| 2012 | Sørlandsparken, Kristiansand | Thomas Gunnestad; NMK Drammen | Mikke Bjerk; Elgane MK | Pierre Moen; NMK Kristiansand |
| 2013 | Geiteryggen Speedwaybane, Skien | Mikke Bjerk; Elgane MK | Rune Sola; Riska MSK | Patrick Herold; Riska MSK |
| 2014 | Riska Speedway, Hommersåk | Mikke Bjerk; Elgane MK | Rune Sola; Riska MSK | Carl Johan Raugstad; Riska MSK |
| 2015 | Elgane, Varhaug | Mikke Bjerk; Elgane MK | Glenn Moi; Elgane MK | Rune Sola; Riska MSK |
| 2016 | Sørlandsparken, Kristiansand | Glenn Moi; Elgane MK | Carl Johan Raugstad; Riska MSK | Jarle Skjæveland; Riska MSK |
| 2017 | By speedwaybane, Brumunddal | Glenn Moi; Elgane MK | Truls Kamhaug; Oslo MK | Jarle Skjæveland; Grenland MSK |
| 2018 | Lunner, Oslo | Lasse Fredriksen; Elgane MK | Glenn Moi; Elgane MSK | Truls Kamhaug; Oslo MK |
| 2019 | Geiteryggen Speedwaybane, Skien | Glenn Moi; Elgane MK | Lasse Fredriksen; Elgane MSK | Truls Kamhaug; Oslo MK |
| 2020 | Lunner, Oslo | Mathias Pollestad; Riska MSK | Lasse Fredriksen; Elgane MK | Glenn Moi; Elgane MSK |
| 2021 | Elgane, Varhaug | Lasse Fredriksen | Mathias Pollestad | Glenn Moi |
| 2022 | Geiteryggen Speedwaybane, Skien | (Denmark) Tim Sørensen | Glenn Moi | Truls Kamhaug |
| 2023 | By speedwaybane, Brumunddal | Glenn Moi | Truls Kamhaug | (Sweden) Ludvig Hamrin |
| 2024 | Sørlandsparken, Kristiansand | Truls Kamhaug; Oslo MK | Glenn Moi; Elgane MSK | Magnus Klipper; NMK Kristiansand |

== See also ==
- Norway national speedway team
- Speedway Grand Prix of Norway
