= British Nordic speedway final =

Motorcycle speedway competition

The British Nordic final was a short lived Motorcycle speedway final sanctioned by the FIM as a qualifying round for the Speedway World Championship.

Introduced to the World Championship in the 1966, it served as a qualifying round for the European final, which was in turn the final qualifying round for the World final. The race consisted of British, Commonwealth and Scandinavian riders but in 1974 riders from the United States also competed. The Intercontinental final was inaugurated in 1975 effectively replacing this event.

== Winners ==
| Year | Venue | Winner | Runner-up | 3rd place |
| 1966 | (England) Sheffield; Owlerton Stadium | (New Zealand) Barry Briggs | (New Zealand) Ivan Mauger | (England) Nigel Boocock |
| 1968 | (England) London; West Ham Stadium | (New Zealand) Ivan Mauger | (England) Nigel Boocock | (Norway) Reidar Eide |
| 1970 | (England) Coventry; Brandon Stadium | (Sweden) Sören Sjösten | (Denmark) Ole Olsen | (New Zealand) Barry Briggs |
| 1971 | (Scotland) Glasgow; Hampden Park | (New Zealand) Ivan Mauger | (England) Ole Olsen | (England) Ray Wilson |
| 1973 | (England) Coventry; Brandon Stadium | (Sweden) Anders Michanek | (Denmark) Ole Olsen | (New Zealand) Ivan Mauger |
| 1974 | (Denmark) Fredericia; Fredericia Stadium | (Denmark) Ole Olsen | (New Zealand) Ivan Mauger | (England) John Louis |

== See also ==
- Speedway World Championship
- Motorcycle speedway
