= Aage Hansen =

Norwegian speedway rider (1935–2023)

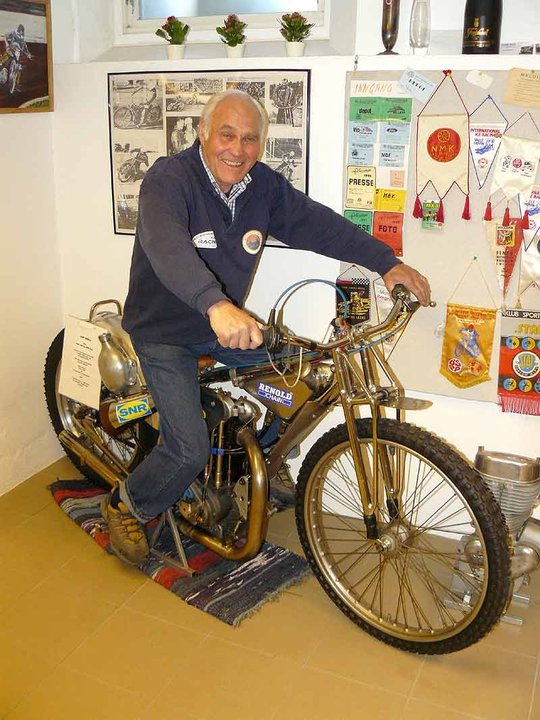
- Hansen in 2010
- Born: 13 April 1935; Skreia, Toten, Norway
- Died: 15 November 2023 (aged 88); Asker, Norway
- Nationality: Norwegian

Career history
- 1957: Ipswich Witches

Individual honours
- 1956, 1957, 1958, 1959, 1960, 1961, 1963: Norwegian Championship
- 1957: Nordic Champion
- 1957: Speedway World Championship finalist

Aage Hansen (13 April 1935 – 15 November 2023) was a Norwegian international motorcycle speedway rider. He earned 22 caps for the Norway national speedway team.

== Speedway career ==
Hansen was a seven-time champion of Norway, winning the Norwegian Championship all years between 1956 - 1961, as well as in 1963. He also was the Nordic Speedway Champion in 1957, and won the Nordic Team Speedway Championship together with Sverre Harrfeldt in 1966.

Hansen also won two silver medals in the Norwegian Longtrack Championship in 1956 and 1963, and was a Nordic Longtrack Team Champion together with Leif Hveem in 1956.

Hansen reached the final of the Speedway World Championship in the 1957 Individual Speedway World Championship, a meeting in which he was recovering from a dislocated knee.

Hansen rode in the top tier of British Speedway for just one season, riding for Ipswich Witches during the 1957 Speedway National League, where he averaged 8.17.

== Death ==
Hansen died in Asker, Norway on 15 November 2023, at the age of 88.

== World final appearances ==
=== Individual World Championship ===
- 1957 - (England) London, Wembley Stadium - 12th - 4pts
