= Lovas =

Lovas is an old and frequent Hungarian Jewish family name, meaning "horseback rider". Many families with such surname can be found in Israel too.

Lovas may refer to:

== Places ==
- Lovas, Croatia
- Lovas, Hungary
- Lovaș, a tributary of the river Ciobănuș in Harghita County, Romania

== People ==
- Antal Lovas (1884–?), Hungarian long-distance runner
- Miklós Lovas (born 1931), a Hungarian discoverer of minor planets and comets
- Petra Lovas (born 1980), Hungarian table tennis player
- Phil Lovas (born c. 1968), American politician

== Astronomy ==
- 93P/Lovas, a comet discovered by Miklós Lovas

== See also ==
- Lova (disambiguation)
- Løvaas, a Norwegian surname (also written Lovaas)
