= Løvaas =

Løvaas, Lövaas or Lovaas is a Norwegian surname. Notable people with the surname include:

- Birger Løvaas (1901–1977), Norwegian actor and comedian
- Dag Lövaas, also Dag Løvaas (born 1951), Norwegian motorcycle speedway rider
- Kari Løvaas (1939–2025), Norwegian opera singer
- Kårstein Eidem Løvaas (born 1967), Norwegian politician
- Ole Ivar Lovaas, also Ole Ivar Løvaas (1927–2010), Norwegian-American clinical psychologist and professor
- Ulf Lövaas, also Ulf Løvaas (born 1947), Norwegian motorcycle speedway rider, brother of Dag
