= Rakotoniaina =

Rakotoniaina is a Malagasy surname.

== People ==
- Justin Rakotoniaina (1933 – 2001), Malagasy diplomat and politician
- Pety Rakotoniaina (born 1962), Malagasy politician
- Lova Adrien Marie Rakotoniaina, Malagasy politician
