= Rune Sola =

Norwegian motorcycle speedway rider (born 1984)

- Born: 1985 (age 40–41)
- Nationality: Norwegian

Career history

Norway
- 2006-2009: Riska

Denmark
- 2002: Brovst
- 2005–2006: Outrup
- 2007: Holstebro

Sweden
- 2002: Norspeed

Individual honours
- 2006-2010: Norwegian Champion

Rune Sola (born 1985) is a former motorcycle speedway from Norway.

== Career ==
Sola began riding at the age of 13.

Sola rode in 2004 Speedway Grand Prix of Norway. He is a five-time champion of Norway, having won the Individual Speedway Norwegian Championship from 2006 to 2010.

== Results ==
=== Speedway Grand Prix ===
2004 SGP
| | Grand Prix | Pos. | Pts. | Heats | Draw |
|---|---|---|---|---|---|
| 1 (1) | (Norway) Hamar | 22 | 2 | (1,1) | 24 |

| permanent speedway rider |
| wild card, track reserve or qualified reserve |
| rider not classified (track reserve who did not start) |

=== World Championships ===
- Individual World Championship (Speedway Grand Prix)
  - 2004 - 40th place (2 points in one event)
- Team U-19 World Championship
  - 2005 - 3rd place in Qualifying Round 2

=== European Championships ===
- Individual European Championship
  - 2007 - 15th place in Semi-Final B

== See also ==
- Norway national speedway team
- List of Speedway Grand Prix riders
