= Arnt Førland =

Norwegian motorcycle speedway rider

- Born: 10 July 1964 (age 62); Sandnes, Norway
- Nationality: Norwegian

Career history

Norway
- 1986–1987: NMK Sarpsborg
- 1988–1995: NMK Oslo
- 2004–2005: Elgane

Sweden
- 1990–1998, 2001–2003, 2013: Valsarna
- 2001: Karlstad
- 2002–2003: Kavaljererna

Individual honours
- 1989, 2004, 2005: Norwegian Championship

Team honours
- 1998: Swedish Elitserien Champion

Arnt Førland (born 10 July 1964) is a Norwegian former international motorcycle speedway rider, who rode in 2004 Speedway Grand Prix of Norway and is a three-time Norwegian champion. He represented the Norway national speedway team during the final of the 1995 Speedway World Team Cup.

== Career ==
In 1989, Førland won the Scandinavian Longtrack championship.

Førland was a three-time champion of Norway, winning the Norwegian Championship in 1989, 2004 and 2005. As part of the Speedway World Championships, he competed in the Nordic Speedway final on multiple occasions.

On 29 September 2013, Førland was taken to hospital following a serious crash, riding for his Swedish team Valsarna during the 2013 Swedish speedway season.

=== Speedway Grand Prix result ===
2004 Speedway Grand Prix Final Championship standings (Riding No 23)
Race no.	Grand Prix	Pos.	Pts.	Heats	Draw No
9 /9	(Norway) Norwegian SGP	18	4	(1,2,1)	23

permanent speedway rider
wild card, track reserve or qualified reserve
rider not classified (track reserve who did not start)

== See also ==
- Norway national speedway team
- List of Speedway Grand Prix riders
