= Svein Kaasa =

Norwegian speedway rider

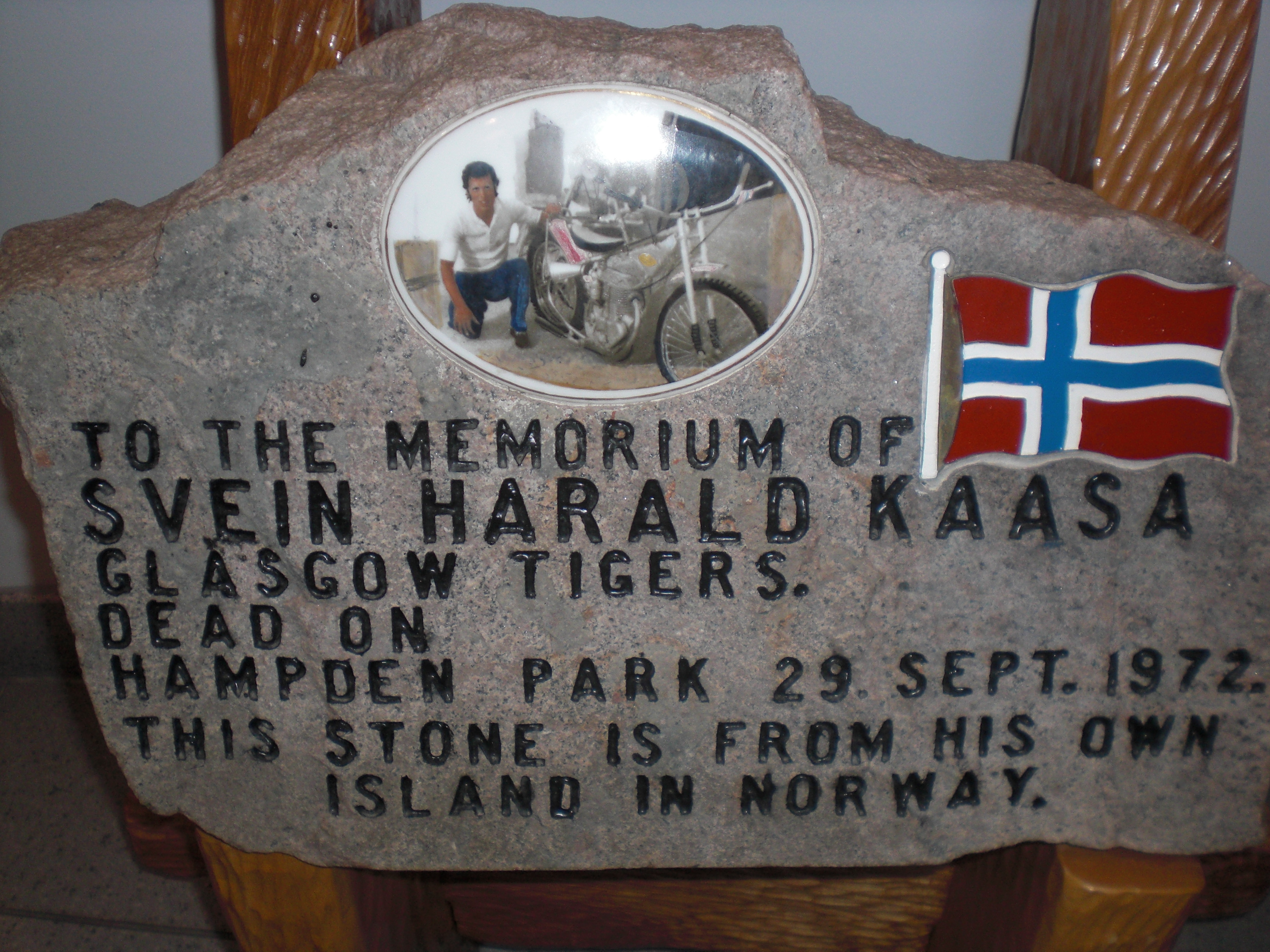
- Stone memorial at Glasgow speedway track
- Born: 16 April 1947; Akkerhaugen, Norway
- Died: 29 September 1972 (aged 25); Glasgow, Scotland
- Nationality: Norwegian

Career history
- 1972: Oxford Rebels
- 1972: Glasgow Tigers

Individual honours
- 1970, 1971: Norwegian championship bronze medalist

Svein Harald Kaasa (16 April 1947 – 29 September 1972) was an international motorcycle speedway rider from Norway who was killed during a race meeting. He earned five caps for the Norway national speedway team.

== Career ==
Kaasa, a draughtsman by trade won the bronze medal at consecutive Norwegian Championships in 1970 and 1971. He joined the Oxford Rebels team for the 1972 British League season, which was the top tier of speedway in Britain at the time. He struggled to find form and was released at which point he moved to league rivals Glasgow Tigers.

On 29 September 1972, Kaasa was riding for Glasgow for the fifth time. In the 11th heat of the meeting at Hampden Park, he touched the rear wheel of Martin Ashby, which threw him from his bike and he was then crushed on the safety fence by his bike. He suffered serious head injuries and medical staff attempted to resuscitate him, but he died on the track.

There is a memorial made from Norwegian stone at the Glasgow Tigers track in his memory.

== See also ==
- Rider deaths in motorcycle speedway
