= Trond Helge Skretting =

Norwegian speedway rider

- Born: 11 March 1959 (age 67); Varhaug, Norway
- Nationality: Norwegian

Career history
- 1979: Wolverhampton Wolves
- 1981: Halifax Dukes

Individual honours
- 1982: Norwegian Championship

Trond Helge Skretting (born 11 March 1959) is a former speedway rider from Norway. He earned three caps for the Norway national speedway team.

== Speedway career ==
Skretting is a former champion of Norway, winning the Norwegian Championship in 1982.

Skretting trialled with Birmingham Brummies in 1977. He rode in the top tier of British Speedway in 1979 and 1981, riding for Wolverhampton Wolves and Halifax Dukes respectively.
