= Grenland Speedway Arena =

Stadium in Skien, Norway

- Location: Voldsvegen 192, 3739 Skien, Norway
- Coordinates: 59°10′59″N 9°34′14″E

Grenland Speedway Arena also known as the Geiteryggen Speedwaybane is a motorcycle speedway track in Skien, Norway. It is located on the south west edge of the municipality, adjacent to Skien Airport, Geiteryggen, off the Voldsvegen road. The stadium is used by the Grenland Speedwayklub.

== History ==
The stadium has been selected as the venue for multiple qualifying rounds of the Speedway World Championship starting in 1965. It has also been the venue for rounds of the Speedway World Team Cup in 1974, 1977, 1985, 1986 and 1987 and the Speedway World Pairs Championship in 1978.

The Norwegian Individual Speedway Championship is regularly held at the track, it has been held on 17 occasions from 1956 to the latest in 2022. The track also holds an annual family event.
