= Kjell Gimre =

Norwegian speedway rider

- Born: 8 October 1946 (age 80); Sandnes, Norway
- Nationality: Norwegian

Career history
- 1971, 1972: Exeter Falcons
- 1972: Glasgow Tigers
- 1973: Coatbridge Tigers

Individual honours
- 1978: Norwegian Championship

Kjell Arvid Gimre (born 8 October 1946) is a former motorcycle speedway rider from Norway. He earned one cap for the Norway national speedway team.

== Speedway career ==
Gimre is a former champion of Norway, winning the Norwegian Championship in 1978.

In 1971, Gimre signed for Newport on a one month trial. He then rode in the top tier of British Speedway from 1971 until 1973, riding for Exeter, Glasgow and Coatbridge.
