= 2022 European Pairs Speedway Championship =

Motorcycle racing competition

The 2022 European Pairs Speedway Championship was the 19th edition of the European Pairs Speedway Championship. the final was held in Slangerup, Denmark on 27 August.

The second semi final was held at the Mâcon speedway track in Mâcon in France on 23 July, where defending champions France were eliminated, along with Italy and the Netherlands. The first semi final was held at the Nagyhalász Speedway Ring in Nagyhalasz, Hungary 8 July and saw Slovenia, Ukraine, Hungary and Finland eliminated.

The title was won by Denmark for the first time.

== Final ==
Position	team	Riders	Points
1	Denmark	Rasmus Jensen (13), Michael Jepsen Jensen (13), Jonas Seifert-Salk (dnr)	26
2	Czech Republic	Václav Milík Jr. (14), Jan Kvěch (9), Daniel Klíma (dnr)	23
3	Poland	Grzegorz Zengota (13), Norbert Krakowiak (8), Kacper Pludra (dnr)	21
4	Sweden	Victor Palovaara (12), Mathias Thörnblom (5), Joel Andersson (1)	18
5	Latvia	Jevgeņijs Kostigovs (10), Daniils Kolodinskis (7)	17
6	(United Kingdom) Great Britain	Tom Brennan (7), Chris Harris (7), Leon Flint (1)	15
7	Norway	Truls Kamhaug (3), Lasse Fredriksen (2), Glenn Moi (1)	6

== See also ==
- 2022 Speedway European Championship
