= 1991 Speedway World Pairs Championship =

22nd edition of the World motorcycle speedway Pairs Championship

1991 World Pairs Championship

Seasons
- ← 1990 1992 →

The 1991 Speedway World Pairs Championship was the twenty-second FIM Speedway World Pairs Championship, held on 20 July 1991. The final took place in Poznań, Poland. The championship was won by Denmark (28 points) who beat Sweden (24 points) and Norway (19 points).

== Semi final 1 ==
- (Czechoslovakia) Svítkov Stadium, Pardubice
- 16 June

Pos.	Team	Rider	Points
1	Sweden (27 pts)	Per Jonsson	14
1	Sweden (27 pts)	Henka Gustafsson	13
2	Norway (20 pts)	Lars Gunnestad	14
2	Norway (20 pts)	Einar Kyllingstad	6
3	Czechoslovakia (20 pts)	Bohumil Brhel	16
3	Czechoslovakia (20 pts)	Zdeněk Tesař	4
3	Czechoslovakia (20 pts)	Antonín Kasper Jr.	0
4	England (19 pts)	Kelvin Tatum	9
4	England (19 pts)	Gary Havelock	6
4	England (19 pts)	Jeremy Doncaster	4
5	Australia (18 pts)	Glenn Doyle	8
5	Australia (18 pts)	Todd Wiltshire	5
5	Australia (18 pts)	Leigh Adams	5
6	Hungary (16 pts)	Zoltán Adorján	8
6	Hungary (16 pts)	Sándor Tihanyi	8
7	Austria (6 pts)	Franz Leitner	5
7	Austria (6 pts)	Andreas Bössner	1
7	Austria (6 pts)	Toni Pilotto	0

== Semi final 2 ==
- (Germany) Rottalstadion, Pocking
- 16 June

Pos.	Team	Rider	Points
1	Denmark (26 pts)	Hans Nielsen	14
1	Denmark (26 pts)	Tommy Knudsen	12
2	Italy (20+3 pts)	Armando Castagna	16+3
2	Italy (20+3 pts)	Valentino Furlanetto	4
3	Germany (20+2 pts)	Gerd Riss	12
3	Germany (20+2 pts)	Klaus Lausch	7+2
3	Germany (20+2 pts)	Tommy Dunker	1
4	United States (19 pts)	Ronnie Correy	12
4	United States (19 pts)	Sam Ermolenko	7
5	New Zealand (17 pts)	Mitch Shirra	15
5	New Zealand (17 pts)	Gary Allan	2
6	Soviet Union (14 pts)	Rif Saitgareev	9
6	Soviet Union (14 pts)	Oleg Kurguskin	5
6	Soviet Union (14 pts)	Mikhail Starostin	0
7	Finland (10 pts)	Juha Moksunen	5
7	Finland (10 pts)	Vesa Ylinen	5

== World final ==
- (Poland) Olimpia Poznań Stadium, Poznań
- 20 July

Pos.	Team	Rider	Points
1st	Denmark (28 pts)	Hans Nielsen	14
1st	Denmark (28 pts)	Jan O. Pedersen	14
1st	Denmark (28 pts)	Tommy Knudsen	—
2nd	Sweden (24 pts)	Henrik Gustafsson	9
2nd	Sweden (24 pts)	Jimmy Nilsen	8
2nd	Sweden (24 pts)	Per Jonsson	7
3rd	Norway (19 pts)	Lars Gunnestad	11
3rd	Norway (19 pts)	Einar Kyllingstad	8
3rd	Norway (19 pts)	Tor Einar Hielm	—
4	Germany (18 pts)	Gerd Riss	9
4	Germany (18 pts)	Klaus Lausch	9
4	Germany (18 pts)	Tommy Dunker	—
5	Czechoslovakia (18 pts)	Bohumil Brhel	12
5	Czechoslovakia (18 pts)	Roman Matoušek	6
5	Czechoslovakia (18 pts)	Zdeněk Tesař	0
6	Italy (10 pts)	Armando Castagna	9
6	Italy (10 pts)	Valentino Furlanetto	1
6	Italy (10 pts)	Fabrizio Vesprini	0
7	Poland (9 pts)	Ryszard Dołomisiewicz	5
7	Poland (9 pts)	Piotr Świst	3
7	Poland (9 pts)	Wojciech Załuski	1

== See also ==
- 1991 Individual Speedway World Championship
- 1991 Speedway World Team Cup
- motorcycle speedway
- 1991 in sports
