= Maier Arena Tønsberg =

Norwegian speed skating arena

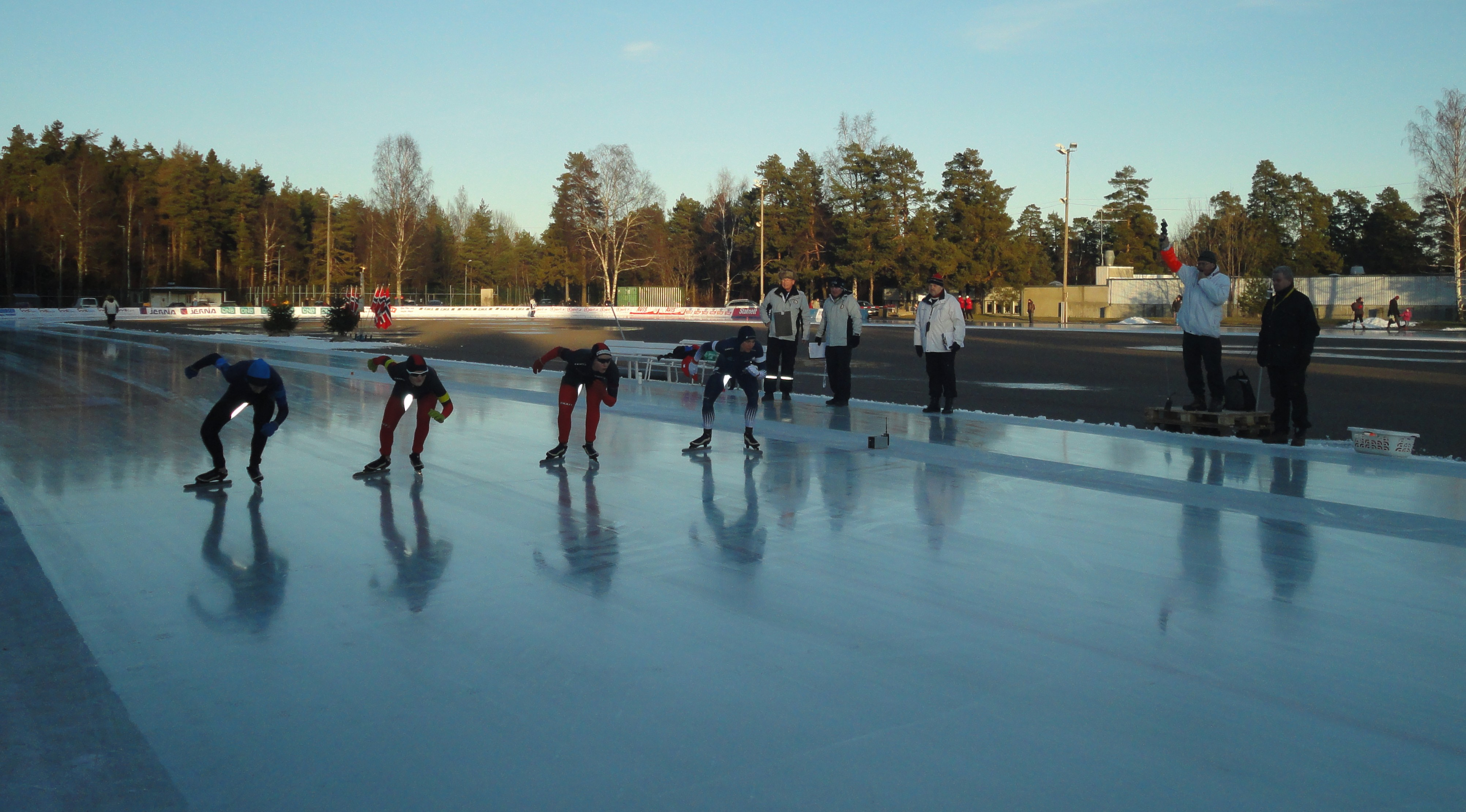
- Interactive map of Maier Arena Tønsberg
- Former names: Tønsberg Stadion and Tønsberg Kunstisbane
- Location: Stadion, 3111 Tønsberg, Norway
- Coordinates: 59°16′58″N 10°24′38″E
- Field size: 400 metres

Construction
- Opened: 27 January 1924
- Renovated: 1996 (changed to artificial)

The Maier Arena Tønsberg (formerly the Tønsberg Stadion and Tønsberg Kunstisbane) is a stadium and artificial ice skating rink in Tønsberg, used for long-track speed skating. The track was previously also used for athletics. It is the home track for the speed skating group of Tønsberg's Gymnastics Association and the rink is located 57 meters above sea level.

== History ==
The arena opened on 27 January 1924 for speed skating.

Tønsberg Stadion (as it was known at the time) hosted motorcycle speedway, when it held the finals of the 1950 and 1957 Norwegian Individual Speedway Championship.

The most important event to be held at the stadium was the 1961 World Allround Speed Skating Championships for Women.

In 1996, the natural ice rink was converted into an artificial rink.

In 2002, the rink organised the Norwegian sprint championship.

In 2012, the rink organised the Norwegian all-round championship.

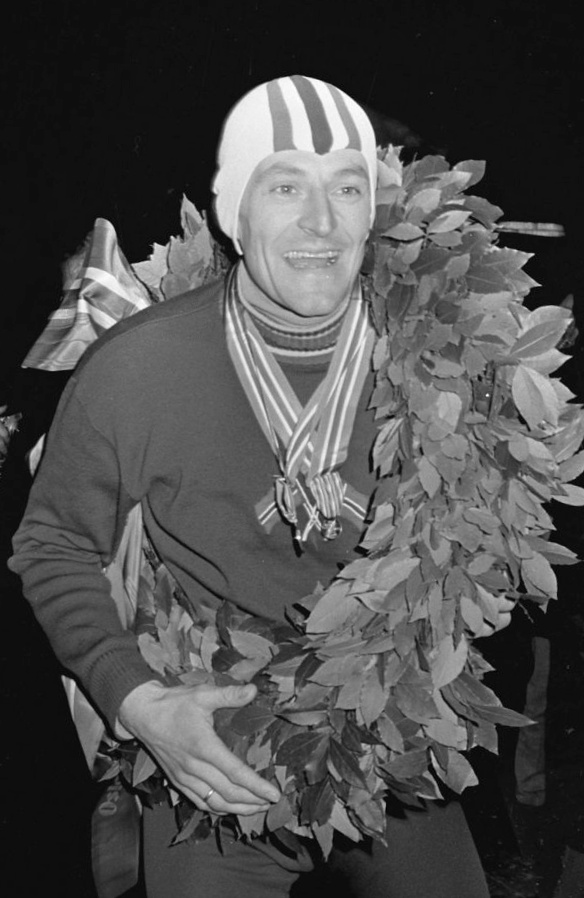
Fred Anton Maier

In 2015, the stadium was renamed, taking the name of Tønsberg's Gymnastics Association's Olympic champion Fred Anton Maier, who died later that year. A statue of Maier was erected at the stadium's south entrance.

== Major Championships ==
- 1926 - National Championships NK all-round men
- 1938 - National Championships NK all-round women
- 1949 - National Championships NK all-round men
- 1961 - World Allround Women's World Championships
- 1964 - National Championships NK all-round men
- 1972 - National Championships all-round men
