= Tormod Langli =

Norwegian speedway rider

- Born: 25 June 1952 (age 74); Porsgrunn, Norway
- Nationality: Norwegian

Career history
- 1976: Newport
- 1977–1978: Bristol Bulldogs
- 1979–1980: Halifax Dukes

Individual honours
- 1984: Norwegian Championship silver medal
- 1983: Norwegian Championship bronze medal

Tormod Langli (born 25 June 1952) is a former motorcycle speedway rider from Norway. He earned 7 caps for the Norway national speedway team.

== Career ==
Langli made his British leagues debut in 1976, when he joined the Newport Wasps for the 1976 British League season. The following season, he moved to ride for the Bristol Bulldogs. Also in 1977, he represented the Norway national speedway team during the 1977 Speedway World Pairs Championship and the 1977 Speedway World Team Cup. He established himself as a heat leader for Bristol and rode for them in 1978.

Langli spent the 1979 and 1980 seasons with Halifax Dukes after being signed for club record £7,000, by which time he was one of the leading riders in Norway and represented them in 1979 Speedway World Pairs Championship and 1979 Speedway World Team Cup.

Further World Cup appearances arrived in 1983 Speedway World Team Cup and 1984 Speedway World Team Cup, in addition to riding for Norway in the 1983 Speedway World Pairs Championship and 1984 Speedway World Pairs Championship. He also won two medals at the Norwegian Individual Speedway Championship; a bronze medal in 1983 and a silver medal in 1984.

== Family ==
Langli's brother Helge was also a Norwegian international rider.
