= Tor Einar Hielm =

Norwegian speedway rider

- Born: Norway
- Nationality: Norwegian

Career history
- 2001: Riska MSK

Individual honours
- 1987: Norwegian Championship

Team honours
- 1991: Speedway World Pairs Championship bronze medal

Tor Einar Hielm is a former international speedway rider from Norway.

== Speedway career ==
Hielm was a champion of Norway, winning the Norwegian Championship in 1987.

Hielm reached the final of the Speedway World Pairs Championship in the 1991 Speedway World Pairs Championship winning a bronze medal, in addition to competing in the Nordic Speedway final on multiple occasions.

== World Final appearances ==
- 1991 - (Poland) Poznań, Olimpia Poznań Stadium (with Lars Gunnestad / Einar Kyllingstad) - 3rd - 19pts
