= 1966 Individual Speedway World Championship =

Motorcycle speedway world championship season

Seasons
- ← 1965 1967 →

The 1966 Individual Speedway World Championship was the 21st edition of the official World Championship to determine the world champion rider.

In the final in Gothenburg New Zealander Barry Briggs equalled the record of Ove Fundin by winning his fourth World title. Norwegian Sverre Harrfeldt took silver and Pole Antoni Woryna took bronze. Ivan Mauger, a 26-year-old New Zealander who had won the European Final qualifier finished fourth.

== Format changes ==
The format of the Championship changed for the 1966 event. With the final to be held in Sweden, six riders from Sweden would be eligible for the World Final by finishing in the top six of the Swedish finals. The remaining Scandinavian riders were pooled in with the British and Commonwealth riders and then the Continental riders, who ultimately would have only 10 places for the World Final.

Two Swedish finals were held during 1966, the three race qualifying for the World Final and another held on 7 October that was separate from the World Championship.

== First round ==
Qualification results.

=== British & Commonwealth qualifying ===
- Top 32 to British & Commonwealth semi-finals

Date	Venue	Winner	2nd	3rd
20 May	Somerton Park, Newport	Nigel Boocock	Jon Erskine	Jack Biggs
20 May	White City, Glasgow	Ron Mountford	Charlie Monk	Eric Boocock
21 May	Old Meadowbank, Edinburgh	George Hunter	Doug Templeton	Norman Hunter
21 May	Brandon Stadium, Coventry	Nigel Boocock	Jim Lightfoot	Bill Andrew
21 May	Hyde Road, Manchester	Brian Brett	Jon Erskine	Cyril Maidment
21 May	Wimbledon Stadium, London	Reg Luckhurst	Bob Dugard	Bob Paulson
23 May	Brough Park, Newcastle	Ivan Mauger	Brian Brett	Mike Broadbank
23 May	County Ground Stadium, Exeter	Ron Mountford	Martin Ashby	Trevor Hedge
24 May	Long Eaton Stadium, Long Eaton	Ray Wilson	Eric Boothroyd	Ivan Mauger
24 May	West Ham Stadium, London	Barry Briggs	Norman Hunter	Malcolm Simmons
25 May	King's Lynn Stadium, King's Lynn	David Crane	Cyril Maidment	Peter Moore
25 May	Wimborne Road, Poole	Bill Andrew	Geoff Mudge	Doug Templeton
26 May	Oxford Stadium, Oxford	Eric Boocock	Jimmy Gooch	Jim Lightfoot
26 May	Owlerton Stadium, Sheffield	Billy Bales	Barry Briggs	Charlie Monk
27 May	Hackney Wick Stadium, London	Colin Pratt	Mike Broadbank	Ivan Mauger
27 May	Monmore Green, Wolverhampton	Ken McKinlay	Terry Betts	Peter Jarman
28 May	Dudley Wood Stadium, Dudley	Ivor Brown	Peter Vandenberg	Colin Gooddy
28 May	The Shay, Halifax	Eric Boocock	Eric Boothroyd	Colin Pratt
28 May	Abbey Stadium, Swindon	Barry Briggs	Martin Ashby	Arne Pander

== Second round ==
=== British & Commonwealth semi-finals ===
- 13 June
- (England) Dudley Wood Stadium, Dudley
- Top 8 to British final

Pos.	Rider	Points
1	(England) Trevor Hedge	12+3
2	(England) Colin Pratt	12+2
3	(England) Mike Broadbank	11+3
4	(England) Norman Hunter	11+2
5	(England) Eric Boocock	11+1
6	(England) Dave Younghusband	11+0
7	(England) Nigel Boocock	10
8	(Scotland) Ken McKinlay	10
9	(England) Martin Ashby	9
10	(England) Cyril Maidment	6
11	(Australia) Geoff Mudge	5
12	(England) Reg Luckhurst	4
13	(New Zealand) Bill Andrew	3
14	(England) Bob Paulson	3
15	(England) Eric Boothroyd	2
16	(England) Ray Wilson	0
17	(England) Ronnie Genz (res)	0

- 15 June
- (England) The Shay, Halifax
- Top 8 to British final

Pos.	Rider	Points
1	(New Zealand) Barry Briggs	15
2	(England) Ron Mountford	12
3	(Australia) Peter Moore	10+3
4	(England) Roy Trigg	10+2
5	(England) Jimmy Gooch	10+1
6	(England) Brian Brett	10+0
7	(Scotland) George Hunter	9
8	(New Zealand) Ivan Mauger	9
9	(England) Terry Betts	7
10	(Australia) Peter Vandenberg	6
11	(Denmark) Arne Pander	5
12	(England) Jim Lightfoot	5
13	(England) Jon Erskine	4
14	(Australia) Charlie Monk	4
15	(Scotland) Doug Templeton	2
16	(England) Colin Gooddy	2

=== Continental qualifying ===
- Top 32 to Continental semi-finals

Date	Venue	Winner	2nd	3rd
8 May	(West Germany) Abensberger Stadion, Abensberg	(Poland) Joachim Maj	(Poland) Andrzej Wyglenda	(Poland) Andrzej Pogorzelski
8 May	(East Germany) Meissen Speedway Stadium, Meissen	(Poland) Jan Mucha	(Poland) Edmund Migoś	(Poland) Marian Rose
8 May	(Hungary) Borsod Volán Stadion, Miskolc	(Poland) Jerzy Trzeszkowski	(Poland) Zbigniew Podlecki	(Soviet Union) Farid Szajnurov
8 May	(Socialist Federal Republic of Yugoslavia) Gradski stadion, Osijek	(Soviet Union) Gennady Kurilenko	(Poland) Stanisław Tkocz	(Poland) Antoni Woryna

=== Norwegian qualifying ===
- 28 October 1965
- (Norway) Dælenenga idrettspark, Oslo
- Top 5 to Nordic Final 1966

Pos.	Rider	Points
1	Sverre Harrfeldt	15
2	Per Aulie	14
3	Johnny Faafeng	13
4	Thorbjorn Nygaard	12
5	Rolf Westerberg	10
6	Thorbjorn Aulie	10
7	Svein Johnsen	8
8	Ivar Arne Hoffgaard	8
9	Hans R. Gaarder	6
10	Olav Aaen	6
11	Einar Egedius	6
12	Svein Svensrud	4
13	Arne Thorbjornsen	2
14	Jan Terje Gravningen	2
15	Svein Tollefsen	2
16	Lars Skjellfoss	1

=== Finnish qualifying ===
- 30 July 1965
- (Finland) Kärpänen Speedway, Lahti
- Top 3 (+1 seeded) to Nordic final 1966

Pos.	Rider	Points
1	Kalevi Lahtinen	15
2	Matti Olin	14
3	Heikki Kaprali	12
4	Esko Koponen	12
5	Antero Salasto	10
6	Jouko Naskali	9
7	Timo Sinkkonene	8
8	Reima Lohkovuori	8
9	Veikko Vesa	7
10	Eero Mantila	6
11	Reijo Tolviander	6
12	Juhani Taipale	5
13	Toivo Skytta	3
14	Teijo Naskali	3
15	Teuvo Morjavaara	2
16	Martti Myllyntausta	0

== Third round ==
=== British & Commonwealth Final ===
- 27 June 1966
- (England) Wimbledon Stadium, London
- First 8 to British/Commonwealth/Scandinavian Final plus 1 reserve

Placing	Rider	Total	1	2	3	4	5	6	7	8	9	10	11	12	13	14	15	16	17	18	19	20	Pts	Pos	21
1	(New Zealand) (3) Barry Briggs	12	3						3				3				3				F		12	1	
2	(New Zealand) (8) Ivan Mauger	11		3						1			2			3			2				11	2	
3	(England) (7) Colin Pratt	10		0					2					3	2					3			10	3	
4	(England) (9) Mike Broadbank	9			3		3						0					1		2			9	4	
5	(Scotland) (1) George Hunter	9	0				2				3				3				1				9	5	
6	(England) (6) Nigel Boocock	9		2				0			2							2			3		9	6	
7	(England) (15) Brian Brett	8				0			1			1						3	3				8	7	3
8	(Scotland) (4) Ken McKinlay	8	2							3				0				0				3	8	8	2
9	(England) (16) Eric Boocock	8				3				2	1						1			1			8	9	1
10	(England) (2) Trevor Hedge	8	1					2				3				2				F			8	10	0
11	(England) (5) Ron Mountford	7		1			0					2					2					2	7	11	
12	(England) (13) Roy Trigg	7				2	1							1		1					2		7	12	
13	(England) (14) Norman Hunter	6				1		3					1		0							1	6	13	
14	(England) (10) Jimmy Gooch	5			2			1						2			0		0				5	14	
15	(England) (12) Dave Younghusband	2			0					E		E			1						1		2	15	
16	(Australia) (11) Peter Moore	1			1				0		0					0						0	1	16	
R1	(England) (R1) Martin Ashby	0																					0	R1	
R2	(England) (R2) Terry Betts	0																					0	R2	
Placing	Rider	Total	1	2	3	4	5	6	7	8	9	10	11	12	13	14	15	16	17	18	19	20	Pts	Pos	21

m - exclusion for exceeding two minute time allowance • t - exclusion for touching the tapes • x - other exclusion • e - retired or mechanical failure • f - fell • ns - non-starter • nc - non-classify

gate A - inside	gate B	gate C	gate D - outside

=== Nordic Final ===
- 19 May 1966
- (Denmark) Selskov Stadium, Hillerød
- First 7 to British/Commonwealth/Scandinavian Final plus 1 reserve

Pos.	Rider	Points
1	(Finland) Kalevi Lahtinen	14
2	(Denmark) Ole Olsen	13
3	(Norway) Sverre Harrfeldt	12
4	(Denmark) Paul Wissing	12
5	(Finland) Matti Olin	12
6	(Norway) Nils Paulsen	8
7	(Norway) Jonny Faafeng	8
8	(Norway) Torbjörn Nygaard	7
9	(Norway) Per Aulie	7
10	(Denmark) Börge Christiansen	7
11	(Denmark) Jan Holm-Nielsen	4
12	(Denmark) Preben Andreasen	4
13	(Finland) Heikki Kaprali	4
14	(Denmark) Jörgen Mogensen	3
15	(Denmark) Kurt Bøgh	2
16	(Finland) Jouko Naskali	1
17	(Denmark) Erik Kastebo	1

=== Continental Semi-finals ===
- 22 May
- (Soviet Union) Trud Stadium, Balakovo
- Top 8 to Continental final

Pos.	Rider	Points
1	(Soviet Union) Gennady Kurilenko	13
2	(Poland) Antoni Woryna	11
3	(Poland) Marian Rose	10
4	(Poland) Konstanty Pociejkewicz	10
5	(Poland) Stanislaw Tkocz	10
6	(Poland) Edmund Migos	10
7	(Soviet Union) Viktor Trofimov	10
8	(Soviet Union) Boris Samorodov	9
9	(Poland) Marian Kaiser	8
10	(Soviet Union) Vladimir Sokolov	7
11	(Poland) Jan Mucha	6
12	(East Germany) Peter Leibing	4
13	(Czechoslovakia) Antonín Šváb Sr.	4
14	(Czechoslovakia) Luboš Tomíček Sr.	3
15	(Czechoslovakia) Jan Holub I	3
16	(East Germany) Hans Jürgen Fritz	0

- 22 May
- (Poland) Rybnik Municipal Stadium, Rybnik
- Top 8 to Continental final

Pos.	Rider	Points
1	(Poland) Andrzej Pogorzelski	14
2	(Poland) Joachim Maj	12
3	(Czechoslovakia) Pavel Mareš	12
4	(Poland) Pawel Waloszek	10
5	(Poland) Andrzej Wyglenda	10
6	(Czechoslovakia) Stanislav Kubíček	9
7	(Czechoslovakia) Jaroslav Volf	8
8	(Soviet Union) Igor Plechanov	8
9	(Poland) Jerzy Trzeszkowski	
10	(Poland) Zbigniew Podlecki	
11	(Soviet Union) Gabdrakhman Kadyrov	
12	(Soviet Union) Farid Szajnurov	
13	(Czech Republic) Bohumír Bartoněk	
14	(West Germany) Manfred Poschenreider	
15	(Czech Republic) Václav Průša	
16	(Soviet Union) Vladimir Kornev	

== Fourth round ==
=== Swedish Qualifying ===
- 24 April, Gamla Motorstadion, Målilla
- Top 8 to Swedish final

Pos.	Rider	Points
1	Per Olof Söderman	15
2	Karl-Erik Andersson	13
3	Olle Nygren	13
4	Bengt Brannefors	10
5	Bo Josefsson	10
6	Gunnar Malmqvist	8
7	Willy Friberg	7
8	Bengt Larsson	
9	Bo Magnusson	6
10	Therje Henriksson	6
11	Sune Stark	5
12	Jan Simensen	5
13	Bengt Svensson	5
14	Conny Samuelsson	4
15	Arne Hansson	3
16	Sven Sigurd	1

- 1 May, Gamla Speedway Track, Visby
- Top 8 to Swedish final

Pos.	Rider	Points
1	Leif Enecrona	14
2	Göte Nordin	15
3	Leif Larsson	11
4	Torbjörn Harrysson	10
5	Arne Carlsson	10
6	Björn Knutson	9
7	Bengt Jansson	9
8	Kurt Westlund	8
9	Bernt Persson	7
10	Anders Michanek	7
11	Nils Ringström	5
12	Hasse Holmqvist	4
13	Yngve Nilsson	3
14	Ryno Westergren	3
15	Sture Lindblom	2
16	Per-Åke Gerhardsson	2
17	Leif Söderberg	1
18	Lars Jansson	1

=== Continental Final ===
- 25 June 1966
- (Czechoslovakia) Slaný Speedway Stadium, Slaný
- First 9 to European Final plus 1 reserve

Placing	Rider	Total	1	2	3	4	5	6	7	8	9	10	11	12	13	14	15	16	17	18	19	20	Pts	Pos	21
1	(Poland) (14) Andrzej Pogorzelski	12				3		3					1		2							3	12	1	
2	(Poland) (12) Antoni Woryna	11			2					3		2			3						1		11	2	
3	(Poland) (13) Konstanty Pociejkewicz	11				2	2							3		2					2		11	3	
4	(Poland) (11) Marian Kaiser	10			0				3		2					3						2	10	4	
5	(Poland) (2) Edmund Migoś	10	3					2				3				0				2			10	5	
6	(Soviet Union) (1) Igor Plechanov	10	2				3				1				1				3				10	6	
7	(Poland) (9) Pawel Waloszek	10			3		1						2					3		1			10	7	
8	(Poland) (7) Stanisław Tkocz	9		3					1					2	0					3			9	8	3
9	(Czechoslovakia) (6) Pavel Mareš	9		2				1			3							X			3		9	9	2
10	(Poland) (8) Marian Rose	9		1						2			3			1			2				9	10	
11	(Soviet Union) (3) Viktor Trofimov	5	1						2				0				2				0		5	11	
12	(Poland) (16) Joachim Maj	4				0				1	0						3			0			4	12	
13	(Poland) (10) Andrzej Wyglenda	3			1			F						1			1		0				3	13	
14	(Czechoslovakia) (4) Stanislav Kubíček	2	0							0				0				2				0	2	14	
15	(Soviet Union) (5) Boris Samorodov	2		0			0					1					0					1	2	15	
16	(Soviet Union) (15) Gennady Kurilenko	1				1			0			0						0	0				1	16	
R1	(Czechoslovakia) (R1) Jaroslav Volf	0																					0	R1	
Placing	Rider	Total	1	2	3	4	5	6	7	8	9	10	11	12	13	14	15	16	17	18	19	20	Pts	Pos	21

m - exclusion for exceeding two minute time allowance • t - exclusion for touching the tapes • x - other exclusion • e - retired or mechanical failure • f - fell • ns - non-starter • nc - non-classify

gate A - inside	gate B	gate C	gate D - outside

=== British/Commonwealth/Scandinavian Final ===
- 14 July 1966
- (England) Owlerton Stadium, Sheffield
- First 7 to European Final plus 1 reserve

Placing	Rider	Total	1	2	3	4	5	6	7	8	9	10	11	12	13	14	15	16	17	18	19	20	Pts	Pos	21
1	(New Zealand) (14) Barry Briggs	15				3		3					3		3							3	15	1	
2	(New Zealand) (11) Ivan Mauger	13			3				3		3					3						1	13	2	
3	(England) (8) Nigel Boocock	12		3						3			2			1			3				12	3	
4	(Norway) (13) Sverre Harrfeldt	10				E	3							2		2					3		10	4	
5	(Scotland) (12) George Hunter	10			2					2		3			1						2		10	5	
6	(Scotland) (7) Ken McKinlay	10		1					1					3	2					3			10	6	
7	(England) (15) Colin Pratt	10				2			2			2						3	1				10	7	
8	(England) (5) Mike Broadbank	9		2			1					1					3					2	9	8	
9	(England) (6) Brian Brett	6		0				2			1							2			1		6	9	
10	(Finland) (4) Kalevi Lahtinen	6	2							1				1				1				1	6	10	
11	(Denmark) (3) Ole Olsen	5	3						F				0				2				0		5	11	
12	(Norway) (2) Torbjörn Nygaard	3	1					1				0				1				0			3	12	
13	(Denmark) (16) Nils Paulsen	3				1				0	0						E			2			3	13	
14	(Norway) (9) Jonny Faafeng	2			1		0						1					0		0			2	14	
15	(Denmark) (10) Paul Wissing	1			0			0						0			1		E				1	15	
16	(Denmark) (1) Börge Christiansen	0	F				-				-				-				-				0	16	
R1	(England) (R1) Eric Boocock	0					2				2				0				2				0	R1	
R2	(Australia) (R2) Gordon Guasco	0																					0	R2	
Placing	Rider	Total	1	2	3	4	5	6	7	8	9	10	11	12	13	14	15	16	17	18	19	20	Pts	Pos	21

m - exclusion for exceeding two minute time allowance • t - exclusion for touching the tapes • x - other exclusion • e - retired or mechanical failure • f - fell • ns - non-starter • nc - non-classify

gate A - inside	gate B	gate C	gate D - outside

== Fifth round ==
=== Swedish Final ===
- Top 6 to World final

Date	Venue	Winner	2nd	3rd
31 May	Ryavallen, Borås	Bengt Brannefors	Björn Knutson	Karl-Erik Andersson
1 June	Ryd Motorstadion, Linköping	Björn Knutson	Per-Olof Söderman	Torbjörn Harrysson
2 June	Ullevi, Gothenburg	Björn Knutson	Torbjörn Harrysson	Leif Larsson

Pos.	Rider	Points
1	Björn Knutson	41
2	Torbjörn Harrysson	35
3	Leif Enecrona	33
4	Leif Larsson	33
5	Per Olof Söderman	32
6	Göte Nordin	31
7	Bengt Brannefors	27
8	Olle Nygren	26
9	Gunnar Malmqvist	25

Pos.	Rider	Points
10	Bernt Persson	18
11	Karl-Erik Andersson	14
12	Bengt Larsson	13
13	Therje Henriksson	7
14	Bo Josefsson	5
15	Bengt Jansson	4
16	Willy Friberg	4
17	Kurt Westlund	4
18	Arne Carlsson	3

=== European Final ===
- 3 September 1966
- (England) Wembley Stadium, London
- First 10 to World Final plus 1 reserve

Placing	Rider	Total	1	2	3	4	5	6	7	8	9	10	11	12	13	14	15	16	17	18	19	20	Pts	Pos	21
1	(New Zealand) (14) Ivan Mauger	14				2		3					3		3							3	14	1	
2	(New Zealand) (16) Barry Briggs	13				3				2	3						3			2			13	2	
3	(Poland) (12) Antoni Woryna	11			1					3		3			2						2		11	3	
4	(Norway) (11) Sverre Harrfeldt	10			2				3		1					3						1	10	4	
5	(England) (1) Nigel Boocock	10	2				2				2				1				3				10	5	
6	(Soviet Union) (5) Igor Plechanov	10		1			3					2					2					2	10	6	
7	(England) (10) Mike Broadbank	9			3			2						2			1		1				9	7	
8	(Poland) (13) Stanisław Tkocz	8				F	1							3		1					3		8	8	
9	(Poland) (15) Andrzej Pogorzelski	8				1			2			1						2	2				8	9	
10	(Poland) (8) Marian Kaiser	7		3						E			2			2			0				7	10	
11	(Scotland) (6) Ken McKinlay	6		2				1			0							3			0		6	11	
12	(Poland) (3) Konstanty Pociejkewicz	5	3						F				1				0				1		5	12	
13	(Poland) (2) Edmund Migoś	4	1					0				0				0				3			4	13	
14	(England) (7) Brian Brett	3		0					1					1	0					1			3	14	
15	(Scotland) (4) George Hunter	2	0							1				0				1				E	2	15	
16	(England) (9) Colin Pratt	0			0		0						E					0		0			0	16	
R1	(Poland) (R1) Pawel Waloszek	0																					0	R1	
Placing	Rider	Total	1	2	3	4	5	6	7	8	9	10	11	12	13	14	15	16	17	18	19	20	Pts	Pos	21

m - exclusion for exceeding two minute time allowance • t - exclusion for touching the tapes • x - other exclusion • e - retired or mechanical failure • f - fell • ns - non-starter • nc - non-classify

gate A - inside	gate B	gate C	gate D - outside

== World Final ==
- 23 September 1966
- (Sweden) Ullevi, Gothenburg

Placing	Rider	Total	1	2	3	4	5	6	7	8	9	10	11	12	13	14	15	16	17	18	19	20	Pts	Pos
1	(New Zealand) (16) Barry Briggs	15				3				3	3						3			3			15	1
2	(Norway) (11) Sverre Harrfeldt	14			3				3		2					3						3	14	2
3	(Poland) (1) Antoni Woryna	13	3				3				1				3				3				13	3
4	(New Zealand) (9) Ivan Mauger	11			2		1						3					3		2			11	4
5	(Sweden) (4) Torbjörn Harrysson	10	2							2				2				2				2	10	5
6	(Sweden) (7) Göte Nordin	9		3					2					3	F					1			9	6
7	(Sweden) (14) Leif Enecrona	8				2		1					2		2							1	8	7
8	(Soviet Union) (13) Igor Plechanov	8				1	2							1		2					2		8	8
9	(Poland) (2) Stanisław Tkocz	7	1					3				2				1				0			7	9
10	(Sweden) (3) Björn Knutson	5	E						1				1				E				3		5	10
11	(Poland) (12) Marian Kaiser	5			0					0		3			1						1		5	11
12	(Poland) (6) Andrzej Pogorzelski	5		2				2			0							1			0		5	12
13	(England) (8) Mike Broadbank	4		1						1			0			0			2				4	13
14	(Sweden) (10) Leif Larsson	3			1			0						0			2		0				3	14
15	(England) (15) Nigel Boocock	2				0			0			1						0	1				2	15
16	(Sweden) (5) Per Olof Söderman	1		0			X					0					1					0	1	16
R1	(Scotland) (R1) Ken McKinlay	0																					0	R1
R2	(Sweden) (R2) Bengt Brannefors	0																					0	R2
Placing	Rider	Total	1	2	3	4	5	6	7	8	9	10	11	12	13	14	15	16	17	18	19	20	Pts	Pos

m - exclusion for exceeding two minute time allowance • t - exclusion for touching the tapes • x - other exclusion • e - retired or mechanical failure • f - fell • ns - non-starter • nc - non-classify

gate A - inside	gate B	gate C	gate D - outside
