= Leif Larsson (speedway rider) =

Swedish speedway rider

- Born: 16 February 1938; Östhammar, Sweden
- Nationality: Swedish

Career history

Sweden
- 1959-1962: Monarkerna
- 1963-1966: Getingarna
- 1968-1969: Indianerna

Great Britain
- 1962: Ipswich Witches

Individual honours
- 1965: Speedway World Championship finalist

Team honours
- 1963, 1964, 1965, 1966: Allsvenskan Champion

Leif Ragnar Larsson (born 16 February 1938) is a former international Motorcycle speedway rider from Sweden. He earned 14 caps for the Sweden national speedway team.

== Speedway career ==
Larsson reached the final of the Speedway World Championship in the 1965 Individual Speedway World Championship. He also earned 14 caps for the Sweden national speedway team.

Larsson rode in the top tier of British Speedway in 1962, riding for Ipswich Witches.

== World final appearances ==
=== Individual World Championship ===
- 1961 – (Sweden) Malmö, Malmö Stadion – Reserve – Did not Ride
- 1965 – (England) London, Wembley Stadium – 11th – 5pts
- 1966 - (Sweden) Gothenburg, Ullevi - 14th - 3pts

=== World Team Cup ===
- 1966 - (Poland) Wrocław, Olympic Stadium (with Björn Knutson / Leif Enecrona / Göte Nordin / Ove Fundin) - 3rd - 22pts (2)
