= Audun Ove Olsen =

Norwegian speedway rider

- Born: 30 May 1951 (age 75); Sandnes, Norway
- Nationality: Norwegian

Career history
- 1976, 1980: Birmingham Brummies

Individual honours
- 1977, 1979, 1981: Norwegian Championship

Audun Ove Olsen (born 30 May 1951) is a former speedway rider from Norway. He earned six caps for the Norway national speedway team.

== Speedway career ==
Ove Olsen is a three times champion of Norway, winning the Norwegian Championship in 1977, 1979 and 1981.

Ove Olsen rode in the top tier of British Speedway in 1976 and 1980, riding for Birmingham Brummies.
