= Krohnsminde =

Sports area in Bergen, Norway

Coordinates: 60°22′33″N 5°20′29″E

Krohnsminde kunstgressbane
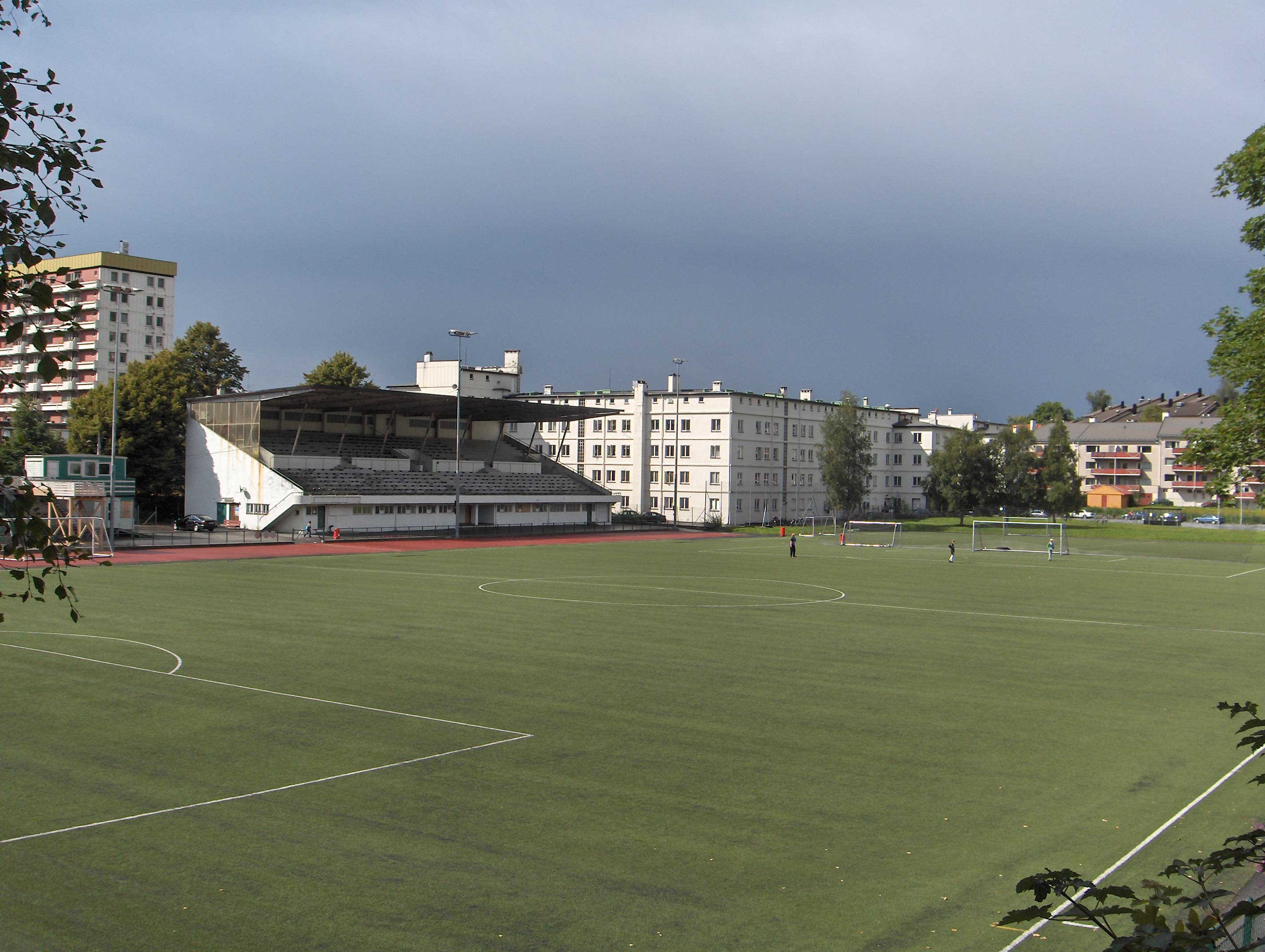
- Interactive map of Krohnsminde kunstgressbane
- Location: Danmarks plass, Bergen
- Owner: Bergen Municipality
- Field size: 105 x 68 m

Construction
- Built: 1930-1947
- Opened: 1947

Krohnsminde kunstgressbane or Krohnsminde Idrettsplass is a municipality-owned sports ground and football stadium located in the city of Bergen, Norway, near Danmarks plass in the borough of Årstad.

== History ==
The terrace was designed by the architect Ole Landmark and finished in 1947. The venue has hosted the Norwegian Athletics Championships in 1950, 1957 and 1961. In 1956, Gordon Pirie set a World Cup record in the 5,000 meters with a time of 13:36.8, and the Norwegian Skating Championships were added to Krohnsminde the year before, in 1955, but due to the weather, two exercises - 1,500 and 10,000 meters had to be moved to Voss. A hall was also built adjacent to the facility where, among other things, several Norwegian boxing championships were arranged.

There was a motorcycle speedway track around the football pitch during the 1960s, when the venue was known as the Krohnsminde Stadion. It held the final of the Norwegian Individual Speedway Championship in 1961, 1966 and 1969, in addition to a qualifying round of the Speedway World Championship in 1965.

In the 1991 season, it hosted the 11 home matches for Fyllingen in the Norwegian Premier League. The official crowd record at Krohnsminde is 11,918 spectators, set on 23 June 1991 when Fyllingen met Brann in a local derby. But when Varegg met Rosenborg in the cup's quarter-finals in September 1971, the number of spectators was probably well over 20,000. The gates were blown up, and the counting devices stopped working. The exact number of spectators was therefore never recorded.

From the 2005 season up to and including the 2007 season, the pitch was used as the home pitch for Løv-Ham Football, which also had office facilities at the sports ground. Krohnsminde is used today by a number of other football clubs, including Ny-Krohnborg IL, SK Trane and Baune SK. During the day, the track is used by nearby schools. The western terrace of Krohnsminde kunstgressbane was demolished in November/December 2008 to make room for a new hospital building.
