= 1968 Speedway World Pairs Championship =

Inaugural edition of the World motorcycle speedway Pairs Championship

Seasons
- ← none 1969 →

The 1968 Speedway World Pairs Championship was the unofficial FIM Speedway World Pairs Championship. The final took place at the Illerstadion in Kempten, West Germany. The championship was won by Sweden (24 points) who beat Great Britain (21 points) and Norway (16 points). Although unofficial at the time it is now regarded as being a major event and is included in all speedway lists.

== Final ==
- (West Germany) Illerstadion, Kempten
- 1 September

Pos.	Team	Rider	Points
1st	Sweden - 24	Ove Fundin (3,3,3,3,2)	14
1st	Sweden - 24	Torbjörn Harrysson (2,2,2,1,3)	10
2nd	Great Britain - 21	Geoff Mudge (1,3,3,3,2)	12
2nd	Great Britain - 21	Ray Wilson (0,2,2,2,3)	9
3rd	Norway - 16	Odd Fossengen (3,3,1,1,3)	11
3rd	Norway - 16	Øyvind S. Berg (2,1,0,0,2)	5
4	West Germany B - 12	Peter Barth (1,2,2,3,1)	9
4	West Germany B - 12	Rudolf Kastl (0,0,1,2,0)	3
5	West Germany A - 10	Manfred Poschenreider (f,3,3,2,0)	8
5	West Germany A - 10	Fred Aberl (-,1,0,0,1)	2
6	Denmark - 6	Jens Hauser (1,2,0,1,0)	4
6	Denmark - 6	Kurt W. Petersen (0,0,1,0,1)	2

== See also ==
- 1968 Individual Speedway World Championship
- 1968 Speedway World Team Cup
- motorcycle speedway
- 1968 in sports
