= Helge Langli =

Norwegian speedway rider

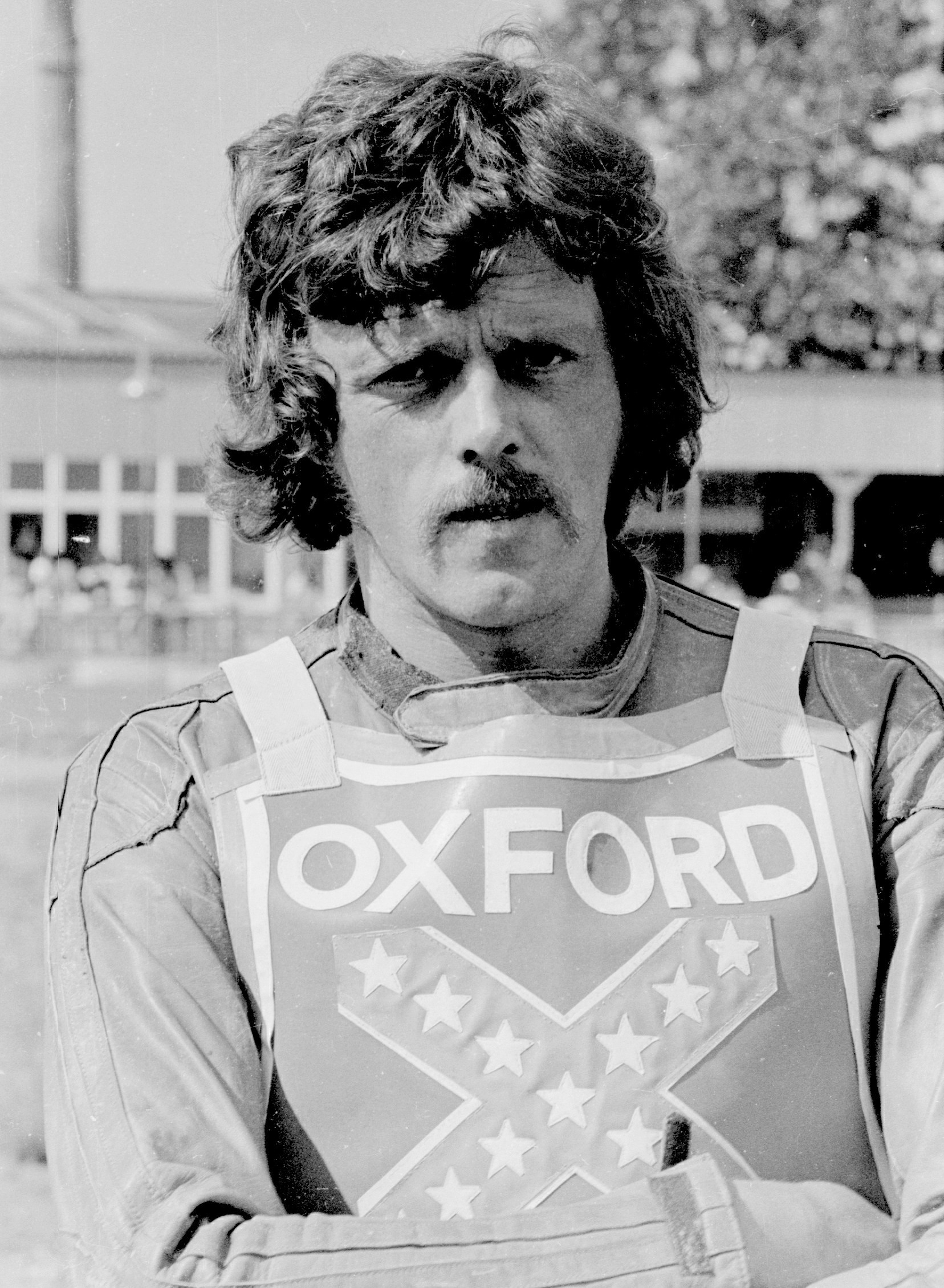
- Born: 22 November 1944 (age 81); Porsgrunn, Norway
- Nationality: Norwegian

Career history

Norway
- 1975–1976: NMK Grenland

Great Britain
- 1969: Newcastle Diamonds
- 1975: Oxford Rebels

Individual honours
- 1975: Norwegian Championship silver medal
- 1976: Norwegian Championship bronze medal

Helge Trygue Langli (born 22 November 1944) is a former motorcycle speedway rider from Norway. He earned 4 caps for the Norway national speedway team.

== Career ==
Langli made his British leagues debut in 1969, when he joined the Newcastle Diamonds for the 1969 British League season.

Langli did not ride in Britain again until 1975 when he joined the Oxford Rebels for the 1975 British League season as a replacement for Hasse Holmqvist. His 1975 season at Oxford ended slightly early after he fell down a flight of stairs. His appearances for his country included participating in the 1975 Speedway World Team Cup and he finished runner-up in the Norwegian Individual Speedway Championship the same year.

== Family ==
Langli's younger brother Tormod was also a Norwegian international rider.
