= 1957 Individual Long Track European Championship =

International motorcycle racing competition

1957 Long Track European Championship

The 1957 Individual Long Track European Championship was the first edition of the Long Track European Championship. The event was held on 15 September 1957 in Stockholm, Sweden.

The title was won by Basse Hveem of Norway.

== Venues ==
- 1st semi-final - Plattling, August 4, 1957
- 2nd semi-final - Vaasa on August 11, 1957
- Final - Stockholm, September 15, 1957

== Final Classification ==
Pos	Rider	Pts
1	(Norway) Basse Hveem	16
2	(West Germany) Josef Hofmeister	14
3	(Norway) Egil Bratvold	14
4	(Finland) Kauko Jousanen	8
5	(Finland) Aulis Tuominen	12
6	(Sweden) Birger Forsberg	9
7	(Denmark) Arne Pander	10
8	(West Germany) Lasse Pettersson	8
9	(Finland) Kalevi Lahtinen	7
10	(Finland) Eino Kylmakorpi	6
11	(Sweden) Tage Nyholm	6
12	(Sweden) Sven Fahlén	4
13	(Sweden) Bert Lindarw	4
14	(Sweden) Joel Jansson	3
15	(Netherlands) Piet van Aartsen	3
16	(Norway) Rolf Westerberg	2
17	(Finland) Ilmo Terrace	2
18	(Norway) Gunnar Hilsen	1
