= Nils Paulsen =

Norwegian speedway rider

- Born: 1935; Norway
- Died: 2017 (aged 81–82); Norway
- Nationality: Norwegian

Career history
- 1956: Leicester Hunters
- 1965: Glasgow Tigers
- 1966: Exeter Falcons

Individual honours
- 1958, 1964: Norwegian Championship silver medal
- 1954, 1963: Norwegian Championship bronze medal

Nils Kristian Paulsen (1935–2017) was a Norwegian international motorcycle speedway rider. He earned 12 caps for the Norway national speedway team.

== Speedway career ==
Paulsen won two silver medals (1958 and 1964) and two bronze medals (1954 and 1963) at the Norwegian Individual Speedway Championship.

Paulsen rode in the British Speedway leagues in 1965 for Glasgow and in 1966 for Exeter.
