= Chevrolet Lova =

The Chevrolet Lova may refer to:

- a rebadge of the Chevrolet Aveo (T200), sold in China 2006–2010
- Chevrolet Lova RV, a subcompact MPV sold in China 2016–2019
