= Øyvind S. Berg =

Norwegian speedway rider

- Born: 8 October 1943; Askim, Norway
- Died: January 2008 (aged 64)
- Nationality: Norwegian

Career history
- 1967: Edinburgh Monarchs
- 1968-1970: Glasgow Tigers
- 1971-1972: Oxford Cheetahs
- 1974: Poole Pirates

Individual honours
- 1967, 1968, 1969, 1976, 1977: Norwegian Championship runner-up

Team honours
- 1968: World Pairs bronze medal

Øyvind Sandem Berg (8 October 1943 – January 2008) was an international motorcycle speedway rider from Norway. He earned 14 caps for the Norway national speedway team.

== Speedway career ==
Berg was a five-time runner-up in the Norwegian Championship in 1967, 1968, 1969, 1976 and 1977.

Berg joined Edinburgh Monarchs in 1967 and then rode for Glasgow Tigers 1968 until 1970, Oxford from 1971 to 1972 and finally Poole in 1974.

== World Final appearances ==
=== World Pairs Championship ===
- 1968 - (West Germany) Kempten (with Odd Fossengen) - 3rd - 16pts (11)

* Unofficial World Championships.
