= Odd Fossengen =

Norwegian speedway rider

- Born: 27 February 1945; Nes, Norway
- Died: 29 December 2017 (aged 72); Oslo, Norway
- Nickname: Oddy
- Nationality: Norwegian

Career history
- 1968-1974: Poole Pirates

Individual honours
- 1967, 1972: Norwegian Championship bronze

Team honours
- 1969: British League Champion

Odd Kristian Fossengen (27 February 1945 – 29 December 2017) was an international motorcycle speedway rider from Norway. He earned eight caps for the Norway national speedway team.

== Career summary ==
Fossengen signed for the Poole Pirates in 1968, following a successful trial with the club and he proved to be a popular signing with the Poole supporters. He continued to ride for Poole for seven years.

Fossengen won the bronze medal on two occasions at the Norwegian Individual Speedway Championship, in 1967 and 1972.

In 1968, Fossengen finished third in the World Pairs Final with Øyvind S. Berg.

Fossengen's only major league honour came in 1969, with Poole winning the British League Championship. In May 1974, Fossengen's speedway career ended after he suffered a badly broken thigh. He was hit by his compatriot Ulf Lovaas' bike while riding for Poole against Oxford.

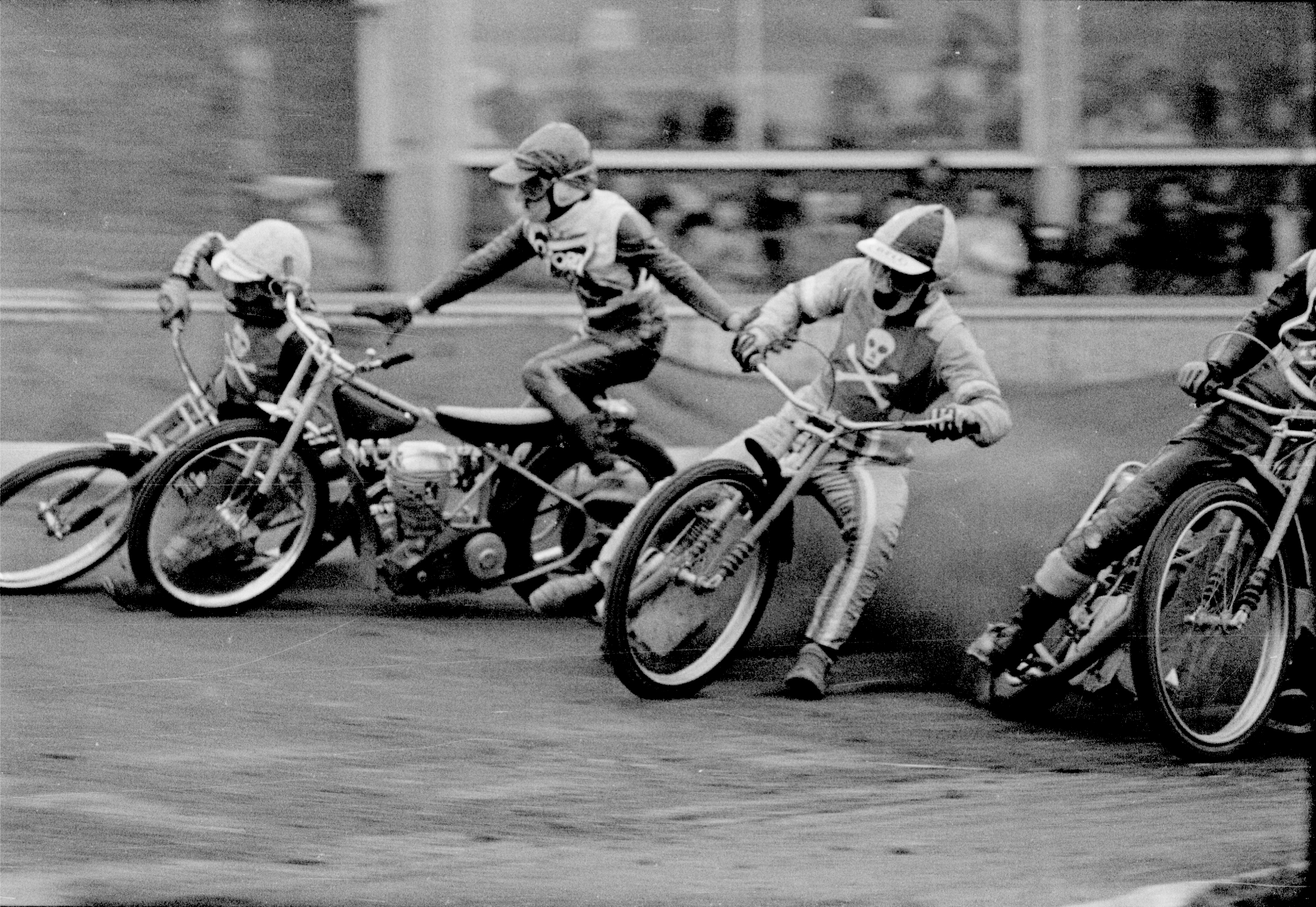
The collision at Oxford that finished his career

== Retirement ==
Fossengen moved back to Oslo in 1974 and worked for a firm selling and repairing hydraulic machinery for seven years. He then set up his own firm selling and repairing compressed air machinery.

Fossengen suffered a massive heart attack on 27 December 2017 and died on 29 December 2017. He is survived by his wife, Susan, and their three daughters, Kirsty, Katrina and Annika.

== World Final appearances ==
=== World Pairs Championship ===
- 1968* - (West Germany) Kempten (with Øyvind S. Berg) - 3rd - 16pts (11)

* Unofficial World Championships.
