= Truls Kamhaug =

Norwegian speedway rider (born 1999)

- Born: 7 January 1999 (age 27); Norway
- Nationality: Norwegian

Career history

Norway
- 2017–2024: Oslo MK

Sweden
- 2019: Masarna
- 2024–2025: Solkatterna

Individual honours
- 2024: Norwegian champion

Truls Kamhaug (born 7 January 1999) is a speedway rider from Norway, he is a Norwegian national champion and has represented the Norway national speedway team.

== Speedway career ==
Kamhaug came to prominence when he represented his nation Norway during the 2022 European Pairs Speedway Championship. His best achievement previously was winning the silver medal at the 2017 Norwegian Individual Speedway Championship.

He rode for Masarna during the 2019 Swedish speedway season and signed for Solkatterna for the 2024 Swedish speedway season.

In 2024, Kamhaug's career was the best yet after he won the Norwegian Individual Championship and competed in the 2024 Speedway European Championship, in addition to representing Norway at both the 2024 Speedway of Nations and the 2024 European Team Speedway Championship
