= Ulf Lövaas =

Norwegian speedway rider

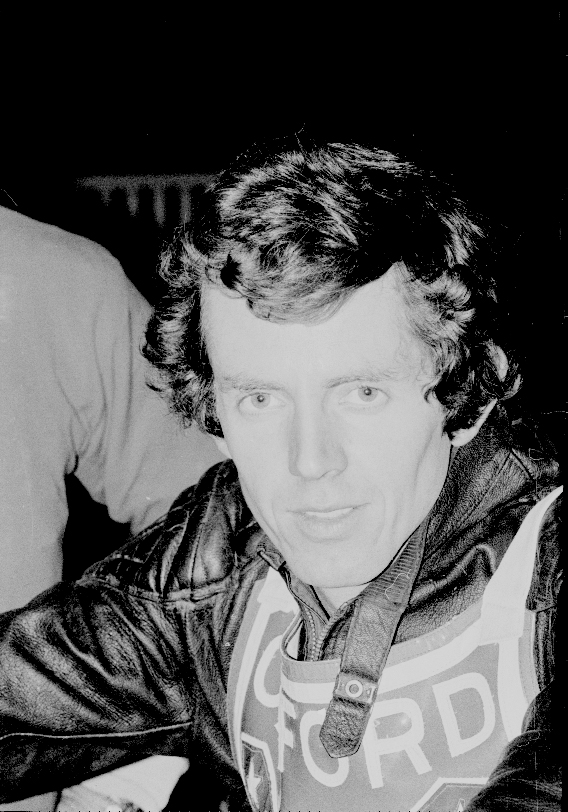
- Born: 24 March 1947 (age 79); Holmestrand, Norway
- Nationality: Norwegian

Career history
- 1973: Cradley United
- 1974: Oxford Rebels

Individual honours
- 1972: Norwegian Champion

Ulf Lövaas (born 24 March 1947 in Holmestrand, Norway) is a former international motorcycle speedway rider from Norway. He earned 6 caps for the Norway national speedway team.

== Family ==
Lövaas' brother Dag was also a speedway rider.

== Career ==
Lövaas was a national champion, winning the Norwegian Individual Speedway Championship in 1972, as a NMK Tønsberg rider.

Lövaas represented Norway in World Team Cup and earned six caps for the Norway national speedway team.

In Great Britain, Lövaas rode for two seasons, in 1973 for Cradley Heathens and 1974 for Oxford Rebels. His brother Dag also rode for Oxford Rebels in 1975.
