= Geiteryggen =

Hill in Norway

Coordinates: 59.0283°N 11.6339°E

Geiteryggen is a mountain ridge in the municipality of Hol in Buskerud, Norway. It is located north of the lake of Strandavatnet. The tourist cabin of Geiterygghytta is situated at the foot of the ridge.
