= Jan Terje Gravningen =

Norwegian speedway rider

- Born: 21 September 1945 (age 81); Kongsberg, Norway
- Nationality: Norwegian

Career history
- 1973: Halifax Dukes
- 1976, 1977: Birmingham Brummies

Individual honours
- 1975: Norwegian Championship

Jan Terje Gravningen (born 21 September 1945) is a former motorcycle speedway rider from Norway. He earned five caps for the Norway national speedway team.

== Speedway career ==
Gravningen was champion of Norway, winning the Norwegian Championship in 1975.

Gravningen rode in the top tier of British Speedway from 1973 until 1977, riding for the Halifax Dukes and Birmingham Brummies.
