= Odd Pettersen =

Norwegian footballer (1926–2008)

Personal information
- Full name: Odd Willy Peterson
- Date of birth: 29 December 1926
- Date of death: 6 July 2008 (aged 81)
- Position: Midfielder

Senior career*
Years	Team	Apps	(Gls)
- Sarpsborg FK

International career
1954	Norway	1	(0)
- * Club domestic league appearances and goals

Odd Willy Pettersen (29 December 1926 – 6 July 2008) was a Norwegian footballer. He played in one match for the Norway national football team in 1954.
