= Elgane =

Stadium near Varhaug, Norway

- Location: Elgane, 4360 Varhaug, Norway
- Coordinates: 58°36′18″N 5°44′30″E

Elgane is a motorcycle speedway and motocross stadium near Varhaug in Norway. The stadium is situated approximately 6 kilometres east of Varhaug, on the Elgane road. The venue has previously been listed as being part of Stavanger but although both are in Rogaland county, Elgane is 50 kilometres south of Stavanger. The facility is run by the Motorsykkel Elgane Klubb and is one of Norway's leading motorcycle speedway venues.

== History ==
Initially the venue was used by the team NMK Stavanger until MK Elgane took over the running of the facility.

It was and still is, a significant venue for important motorcycle speedway events. It held qualifying rounds of the Speedway World Championship, starting in 1979 and qualifying rounds of the Speedway World Team Cup in 1982 and 1992.

The track held the final of the 1994 Speedway Under-21 World Championship.

Additionally, it was the only Norwegian track to host the Intercontinental final in 1995 and has been selected for the final of the Norwegian Individual Speedway Championship on 15 occasions from 1982 to 2021.
