= Lova Adrien Marie Rakotoniaina =

Malagasy politician

Lova Adrien Marie Rakotoniaina is a Malagasy politician. A member of the National Assembly of Madagascar, he was elected as a member of the Tiako I Madagasikara party in the 2007 Malagasy parliamentary elections. He represents the constituency of Miandrivazo.
