= Lasse Fredriksen =

Norwegian speedway rider

- Born: 8 June 1997 (age 29); Varhaug, Norway
- Nationality: Norwegian

Career history

Great Britain
- 2022–2024: Edinburgh
- 2025: Plymouth

Sweden
- 2022, 2024: Valsarna
- 2025: Griparna

Denmark
- 2015–2016: Grindsted
- 2018: Esbjerg

Individual honours
- 2018, 2021: Norwegian champion

Lasse Fredriksen (born 8 June 1997) is a Norwegian speedway rider, he is a two time Norwegian national champion.

== Speedway career ==
In 2018 and 2021, Fredriksen won the Norwegian Individual Speedway Championship.

Fredriksen began his British speedway career riding for the Edinburgh Monarchs in the SGB Championship 2022. He had previously agreed to ride for the Monarchs during the 2020 season but the season was cancelled due to the COVID-19 pandemic, and the following year in 2021, he encountered work permit issues. He helped Valsarna win the Allsvenskan during the 2022 Swedish Speedway season.

In 2023 and 2024, Fredriksen re-signed for Edinburgh for the SGB Championship 2023 and SGB Championship 2024 seasons.

Fredriksen joined Plymouth Gladiators for the SGB Championship 2025.
