= Glenn Moi =

Norwegian speedway rider

- Born: 27 September 1996 (age 30); Norway
- Nationality: Norwegian

Career history

Norway
- 2015–2020: Elgane MK

Sweden
- 2018: Kavaljererna
- 2022: Örnarna
- 2019, 2022–2025: Valsarna

Individual honours
- 2016, 2017, 2019, 2023: Norwegian champion

Glenn Moi (born 27 September 1996) is a speedway rider from Norway, he is a three times Norwegian national champion.

== Speedway career ==
In 2016, 2017 and 2019, Moi won the Norwegian Individual Speedway Championship.

Moi represented Norway during the 2022 European Pairs Speedway Championship and the 2022 Speedway of Nations and the 2024 Speedway of Nations.

In 2023, Moi won his fourth national championship.
