= Dag Lövaas =

Norwegian speedway rider

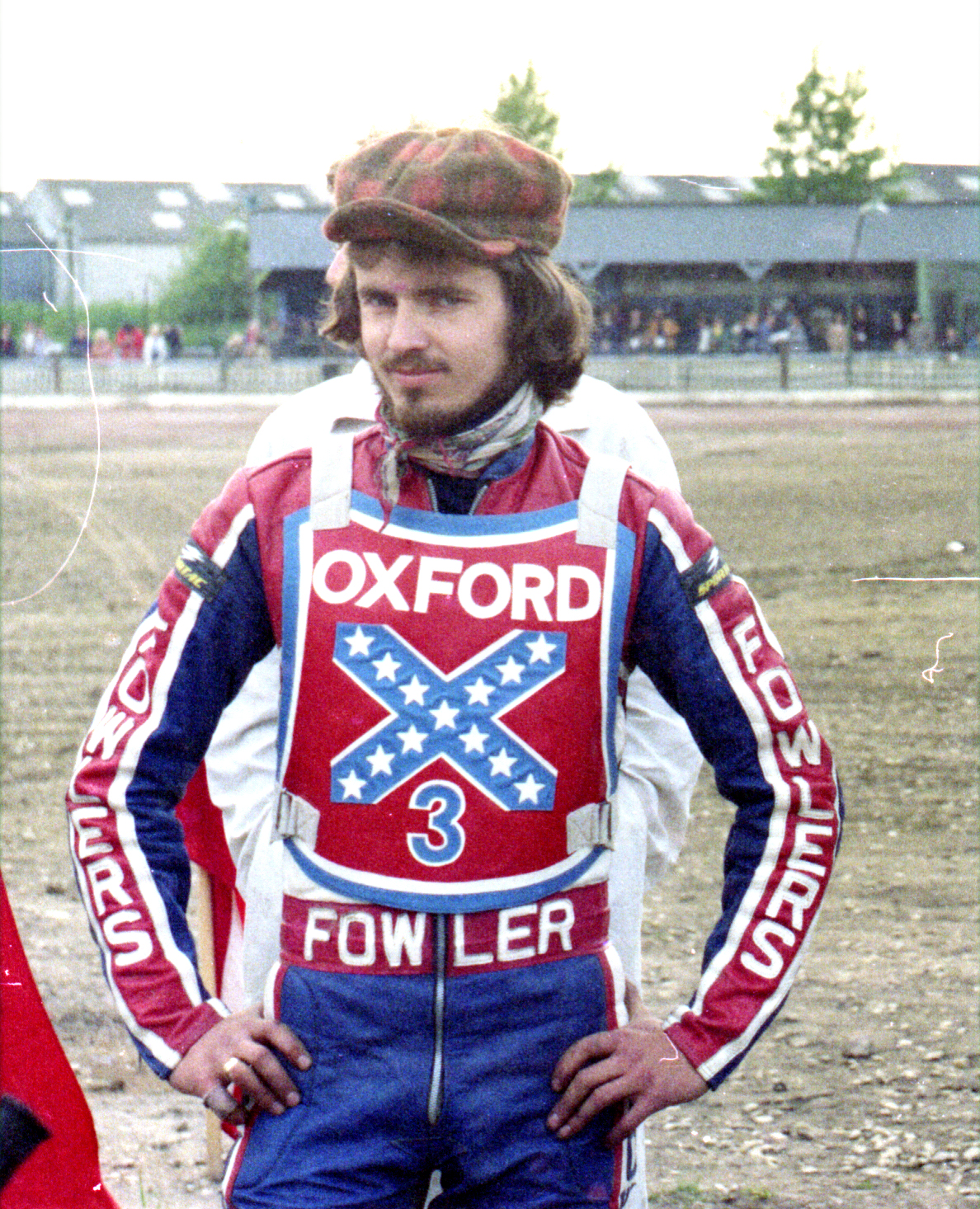
- Born: 25 February 1951 (age 75); Holmestrand, Norway
- Nationality: Norwegian

Career history
- 1970: Newcastle Diamonds
- 1971-1973: Reading Racers
- 1974: Hackney Hawks
- 1975: Oxford Rebels
- 1976: White City Rebels

Individual honours
- 1973, 1974: Norwegian Champion

Team honours
- 1973: British League winner
- 1972: Spring Gold Cup winner
- 1975: Midland Cup winner

Dag Lövaas (born 25 February 1951 in Holmestrand, Norway) is a former international motorcycle speedway rider, who reached the finals of the Speedway World Championship in 1974. He earned 9 caps for the Norway national speedway team.

== Family ==
Lövaas' brother Ulf was also a speedway rider.

== Career summary ==
Lövaas was twice Norwegian champion, winning the Norwegian Individual Speedway Championship in 1973 and 1974, as a NMK Tønsberg rider.

In Great Britain, Lövaas started his career with Newcastle Diamonds in 1970. He won the British League in 1973 with Reading Racers finishing with the fifth highest average in the league. When Reading closed for a year, he moved to the Hackney Hawks in 1974, finishing the season with the highest recorded average in the Hawks' history.

Lövaas then rode for Oxford Rebels (photo) in 1975, winning the Midland Cup and then moved with the team and the promoters Danny Dunton and Robert Dugard to become the White City Rebels in 1976. Dag had been keen to ride at Oxford, a track he loved and was disappointed at the move to the London stadium in 1976. On deciding not to return to England in 1977, White City were granted a 'Dag Lovaas (Rider Replacement)' facility for the entire season, in which they ended up as champions.

== World Final appearances ==
=== Individual World Championship ===
- 1974 - (Sweden) Gothenburg, Ullevi - 11th place - 5 points

=== World Pairs Championship ===
- 1973 - (Sweden) Borås (with Reidar Eide) - 5th - 17pts (8)
