= Reidar Eide =

Norwegian speedway rider

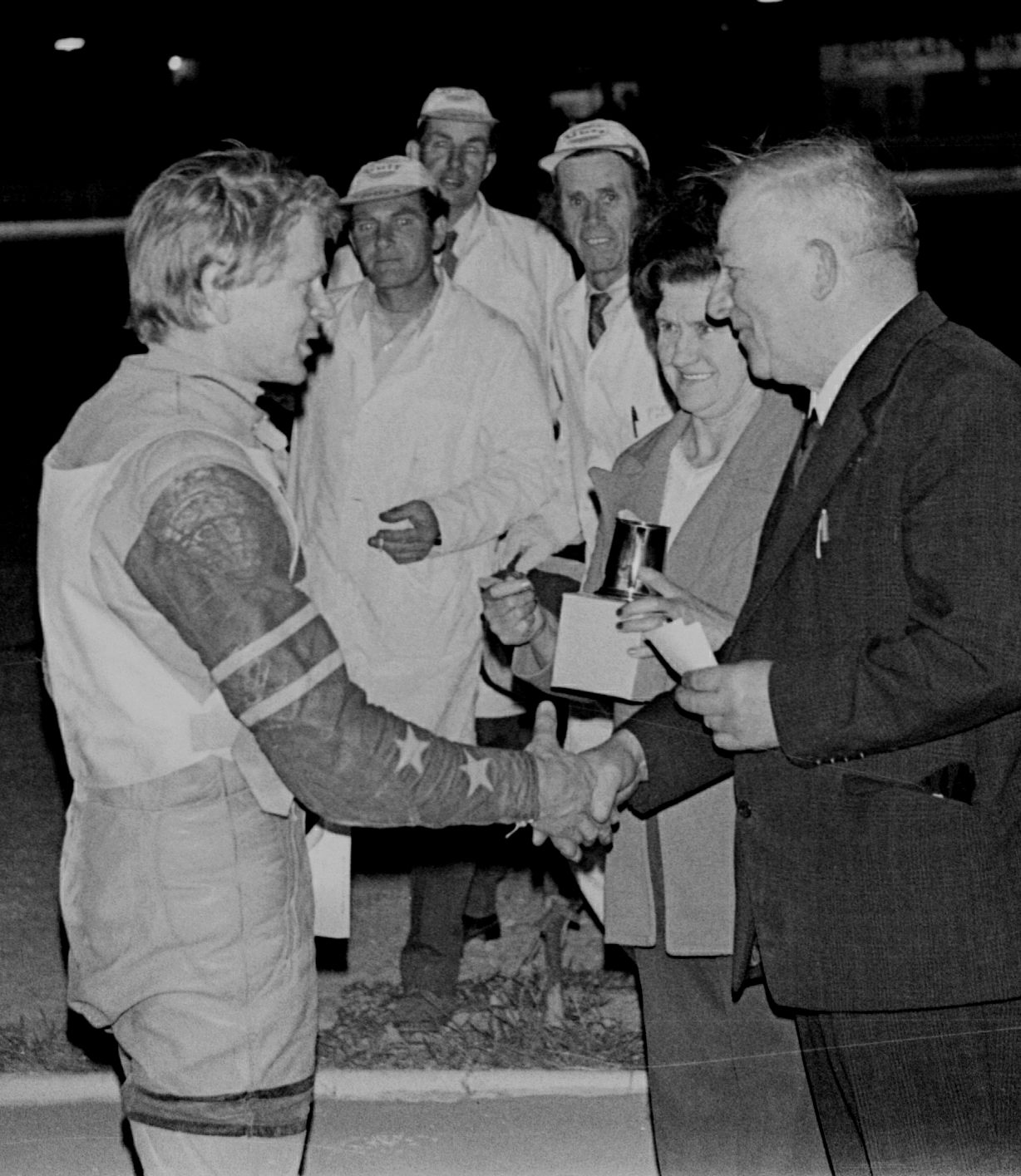
- Born: 6 November 1940; Høyland Municipality, Norway
- Died: February 1999 (aged 58); Thailand
- Nationality: Norwegian

Career history
- 1966-1967: Edinburgh Monarchs
- 1968-1969: Coatbridge Monarchs
- 1970: Wembley Lions
- 1971: Poole Pirates
- 1972: Sheffield Tigers
- 1973-1975: Newport
- 1976-1977: Leicester Lions
- 1978: Exeter Falcons
- 1979-1980: Reading Racers
- 1980: Swindon Robins
- 1980: Eastbourne Eagles
- 1980: Wolverhampton Wolves

Individual honours
- 1967, 1968, 1969, 1970, 1971: Norwegian Champion
- 1968: Nordic Champion
- 1969: Scottish Open Champion

Team honours
- 1974, 1975, 1978: Spring Gold Cup Winner

Reidar Eide (6 November 1940 – February 1999) was a Norwegian motorcycle speedway rider, who was champion of Norway on five occasions.

== Biography ==
Born in Høyland Municipality, Eide took up speedway in 1957. He rode for Stavanger in 1960 and made his British League debut in 1966 for Edinburgh Monarchs, where he set the track record, and during his career also rode in several other countries including Poland, Czechoslovakia, East Germany, West Germany, Sweden, Denmark, and Finland. In 1967, he averaged 8.99 points per match, scoring seven full maximum scores and averaged just over 9 in 1968. In 1969, for Coatbridge Monarchs, he averaged over 10. Gaining a reputation for being difficult to deal with, over the next three seasons he moved on to Wembley Lions, Poole Pirates, and Sheffield Tigers, before signing for Newport Wasps in 1973. He maintained his high scoring for Newport, averaging over 9 in the 1973, 74 and 75 league seasons.

In 1976, Eide moved on to Leicester Lions, averaging over 7.5 before a broken leg ended his season. The following season, lacking fitness, his level of performance had dropped, taking seven rides to score his first point, and only averaging just over 3 points from six matches. In 1978 he moved on to Exeter Falcons, where he once again showed his true form, before moving on to Reading Racers the following year. In 1980, his last year in British speedway, he rode for Reading, Wolverhampton Wolves, Swindon Robins, and one match for Eastbourne Eagles.

Eide won the Norwegian Championship for five successive years between 1967 and 1971, and won the Nordic Championship in 1972. He finished in thirteenth place in the 1968 World Championship Final, and finished fifth (with Dag Lövaas) in the 1973 World Pairs final. He represented Norway and a combined Norway/Denmark team in international matches between 1969 and 1973.

Eide also skied competitively, representing Sandnes IL.

After speedway, Eide became a pig farmer. He died in February 1999 from brucellosis.

== World final appearances ==
=== Individual World Championship ===
- 1968 - (Sweden) Gothenburg, Ullevi - 13th - 3pts

=== World Pairs Championship ===
- 1973 - (Sweden) Borås (with Dag Lövaas) - 5th - 17pts (9)
