= Sverre Harrfeldt =

Norwegian speedway rider

- Born: 23 November 1937 (age 88); Oslo, Norway
- Nationality: Norwegian

Career history
- 1963-1964: Wimbledon Dons
- 1965-1968, 1970: West Ham Hammers
- 1971: Wembley Lions

Individual honours
- 1965: London Riders' Champion
- 1962, 1964, 1965, 1966: Norwegian Champion

Team honours
- 1965: British League Champion
- 1965: British League KO Cup Winner
- 1965, 1966, 1967: London Cup

Sverre Olav Harrfeldt (born 23 November 1937, Oslo) is a former speedway rider from Norway. He earned seven caps for the Norway national speedway team.

== Career ==
Harrfeldt finished second in the 1966 World championships beaten in race 9 by Barry Briggs the eventual champion.

Harrfeldt started his British leagues career riding for Wimbledon Dons during the 1963 Speedway National League season. After two seasons with Wimbledon, he joined the West Ham Hammers where he won the league and cup double. He was the leading rider at West Ham for a five year period and recorded two ten plus average seasons.

Harrfeldt later rode for Wembley Lions. In 1972, Wembley sent their entire team out on loan due to extra football fixtures stopping the speedway at Wembley and Harrfeldt moved to Oxford Cheetahs but did not continue racing.

== World Final Appearances ==
=== Individual World Championship ===
- 1963 - (England) London, Wembley Stadium - 6th - 10pts
- 1966 - (Sweden) Gothenburg, Ullevi - 2nd - 14pts
