= Rolf Westerberg =

Norwegian speedway driver

- Born: Norway
- Nationality: Norwegian

Individual honours
- 1957, 1961: Long Track World Championship finalist
- 1954, 1956, 1959: Norwegian Championship silver medal

Rolf Westerberg is a former speedway rider from Norway. He won the silver medal on three occasions at the Norwegian Individual Speedway Championship in 1954, 1956 and 1959.

Westerberg reached the final of the Individual Speedway Long Track World Championship in 1957 and 1961.
