= Einar Kyllingstad =

Norwegian speedway rider

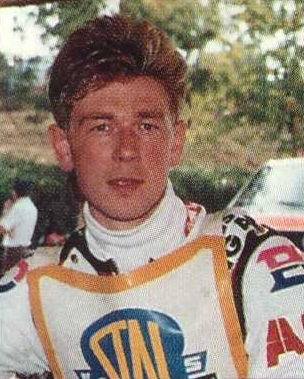
- Born: 17 July 1965 (age 61); Bryne, Norway
- Nationality: Norwegian

Career history

Great Britain
- 1985: Reading Racers
- 1986, 1987: King's Lynn Stars
- 1988: Oxford Cheetahs
- 1988: Sheffield Tigers

Sweden
- 1990–1999: Rospiggarna

Individual honours
- 1984, 1985: Norwegian Championship

Team honours
- 1991: World Pairs Championship (bronze medal)
- 1995, 1997: Elitserien Champion
- 1994: Allsvenskan Winner

Einar Kyllingstad (born 17 July 1965) is a Norwegian former speedway rider.

== Speedway career ==
Kyllingstad hailed from Salte. Growing up on a farm, he began riding a moped as a child, and competitive speedway at the age of 17. He attended a vocational course in mechanics, and while still living1 in Norway, he was a farmhand for his brother-in-law.

Kyllingstad is a two times champion of Norway, winning the Norwegian Championship in 1984 and 1985. He earned 16 caps for the Norway national speedway team.

In 1985, Kyllingstad signed for Reading Racers. He had visited several clubs in late 1984 to gauge various contract offers. In British speedway, Kyllingstad would earn "an annual salary far exceeding that of a regular industrial labourer in Norway". Kyllingstad then rode in the top tier of British Speedway from 1985 until 1988, riding for the King's Lynn Stars, Oxford Cheetahs and Sheffield Tigers.

In 1989, Kyllingstad settled in Hallstavik, Sweden. He was disillusioned with the speedway milieu in England, which he described as "too harsh", claiming that his manager tried to pressure him to continue racing after Kyllingstad crashed and sustained a concussion. As a "coincidence" he came in contact with the speedway club Rospiggarna and raced for them for several years. By 1997, he still earned a normal fulltime salary from speedway, combined with working in a paper factory during offseason.

Riding for Norway in the World Championships, Kyllingstad (together with Lars Gunnestad) became the first Norwegian rider to reach the final series of the World Pairs Championship, in 1991.
