= Basse Hveem =

Norwegian speedway rider

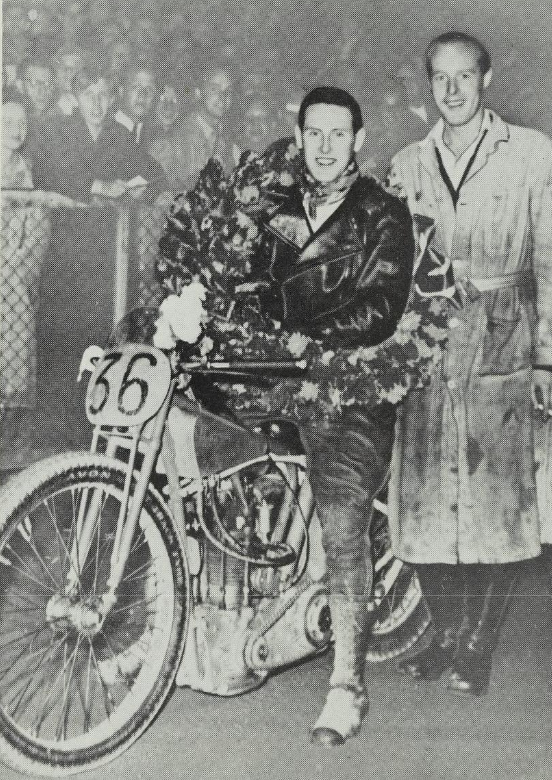
- Born: 29 March 1920; Oslo, Norway
- Died: 23 July 1964 (aged 44)
- Nationality: Norwegian

Career history
- 1953: West Ham Hammers

Individual honours
- 1957: European Longtrack Champion
- 1953: Continental Champion
- 1940, 1947, 1948, 1949, 1951, 1952, 1953: Norwegian Championship
- 1952: Nordic Champion

Leif Hveem known as Basse Hveem (29 March 1920 – 23 July 1964) was an international motorcycle speedway rider from Norway.

== Speedway career ==
Hveem won the gold medal at the European Longtrack Champion in the 1957 Individual Long Track European Championship.

In 1953, Hveem won the second Continental Speedway Final, but crashed out of the world championship after breaking his collar-bone.

Hveem was champion of Norway seven times in 1940, 1947, 1948, 1949, 1951, 1952 and 1953. He was also the Norwegian Longtrack Champion in 1947, 1948, 1949, 1951, 1953, 1955, 1956, 1957 and the Scandinavian Longtrack Champion in 1946, 1947, 1948, 1949, 1950, 1951, 1956, 1957.

Hveem rode a few meetings in the top tier of British Speedway in 1953, riding for West Ham Hammers.
