= 1986 Speedway World Team Cup =

27th edition of the annual motorcycle speedway World Cup competition

Seasons
- ← 1985 1987 →

The 1986 Speedway World Team Cup was the 27th edition of the FIM Speedway World Team Cup to determine the team world champions.

A new format was started in 1986 whereby teams were seeded into groups, with Group 1 containing the leading nations competing over three legs to determine the champions. A promotion and relegation system was in place for the groups. Denmark won all three legs and therefore easily won their fourth consecutive title (and sixth in total) equalling Sweden's six titles and moving into equal second place in the all-time list. It was also Hans Nielsen's sixth gold medal having taken part in all of Denmark's title wins.

== Group 4 ==
Day	Venue	Winner
Teams ranked 13–16
4 May	(Socialist Federal Republic of Yugoslavia) Krško	Austria
22 June	(Norway) Skien	Austria
18 August	(Netherlands) Amsterdam	Norway
7 September	(Austria) Wiener Neustadt	Austria

- Winner promoted to Group 3 in 1987

Round 1

- 4 May 1986
- (Socialist Federal Republic of Yugoslavia) Matija Gubec Stadium, Krško

First	Second	Third	Fourth
Austria - 43; Siegfried Eder (2,0,-,X,-) - 2 Heinrich Schatzer (3,3,3,2,3) - 14; Toni Pilotto (3,2,0,3,2) - 10; Adi Funk (3,2,2,1,-) - 8 Walter Nebel (-,-,3,-,3/3) - 9	Netherlands - 37; Frits Koppe (1,1,-,3,2) - 7 Rob Steman (1,3,1,-,-) - 4 Leo Bathoorn (2,2,1,-,1) - 6 Henk Steman (2,3,1,0,-) - 6 Henny Kroeze (-,-,3,3/3,3/1) - 13	Norway - 25; Per Magne Levang (0,-,-,2,-) - 2 Ingvar Skogland (0,2,-,0,1) - 3 Willy Tjessem (2,1,0,2,2) - 7 Arnt Førland (3,3,2,2,0) - 10; Jan Arild Slaata (-,X,2,0,1) - 3	Yugoslavia - 13; Zvone Gerjevic (1,-,0,0,-) - 1 Artur Horvat (1,0,-,1,0) - 2 Albert Kocmut (0,0,-,-,0) - 0 Zvonko Pavlic (0,1,3,0,2) - 6 Krešo Omerzel (-,0,2/1,1,0) - 4

Round 2

- 22 June 1986
- (Norway) Geiteryggen Speedwaybane, Skien

First	Second	Third	Fourth
Austria - 44; Heinrich Schatzer - 13; Adi Funk - 11; Walter Nebel - 11; Siegfried Eder - 9 Toni Pilotto - NS	Netherlands - 37; Henny Kroeze - 14; Frits Koppe - 11; Rob Steman - 8 Henk Steman - 2 Leo Bathoorn - 2	Norway - 28; Thor Halvorsroed - 9 Willy Tjessem - 8 Ingvar Skogland - 6 Arnt Førland - 4 Per Magne Levang - 1	Yugoslavia - 11; Krešo Omerzel - 4 Lazar Caba - 4 Zvone Gerjevic - 2 Zdravko Tominac - 1

Round 3

- 18 August 1986
- (Netherlands) Olympic Stadium, Amsterdam

First	Second	Third	Fourth
Norway - 41; Ingvar Skogland - 13; Einar Kyllingstad - 12; Tor Einar Hielm - 8 Arnt Førland - 6 Willy Tjessem - 2	Austria - 36; Walter Nebel - 13; Siegfried Eder - 9 Toni Pilotto - 8 Robert Funk - 4 Adi Funk - 2	Netherlands - 36; Henny Kroeze - 14; Frits Koppe - 10; Henk Steman - 8 Leo Bathoorn - 2 Robert Jan Munnecom - 0	Yugoslavia - 2* Piet Seur* - 2 Ron van Dam* - 2 Joze Zibert - 2 Wil Stroes* - 1

- 3 Yugoslav riders did not arrive at Amsterdam, and were then banned from appearing in the Wiener Neustadt round by the Yugoslav Federation. At Amsterdam they were replaced by Dutch reserves, whose points did not count in the Yugoslav team score.

Round 4

- 7 September 1986
- (Austria) Stadion Wiener Neustadt, Wiener Neustadt

First	Second	Third	Fourth
Austria - 54; Walter Nebel (3,3,3,3,3) - 15; Toni Pilotto (3,1,-,1,-) - 5 Siegfried Eder (3,2,-,3,3) - 11; Robert Funk (3,3,2,-,-) - 8 Heinrich Schatzer (-,-,3/3,3,3/3) - 15	Netherlands - 33; Frits Koppe (2,3,2,2,2) - 11; Henk Steman (1,1,-,2,-) - 4 Rob Steman (1,1,1,-,1) - 4 Leo Bathoorn (1,0,-,1,-) - 2 Henny Kroeze (-,-,2/3,3,2/2) - 12	Norway - 29; Jan Arild Slaata (0,-,1,-,1) - 2 Tor Einar Hielm (2,3,2,1,1) - 9 Robert Langeland (2,2,1,2,1) - 8 Arnt Førland (2,2,E,2,2) - 8 Thor Halversroed (-,2,-,F,-) - 2	Yugoslavia - 4 Franc Kalin (1,1,0,F,0) - 1 Joze Zibert (0,0,0,0,0) - 0 Gregor Pintar (0,0,1,0,0) - 1 Gorazd Gorjup (F,0,0,1,0) - 1

== Group 3 ==
Day	Venue	Winner
Teams ranked 9–12
22 June	(Italy) Lonigo	Italy
10 August	(Finland) Tampere	Finland
7 September	(Hungary) Debrecen	Hungary

- Winner promoted to Group 2 in 1987 ; 4th relegated to Group 4 in 1987

Round 1

- 22 June 1986
- (Italy) Santa Marina Stadium, Lonigo

First	Second	Third	Fourth
Italy - 44; Armando Castagna - 14; Valentino Furlanetto - 13; Armando Dal Chiele - 9 Gianni Famari - 8	Finland - 42; Kai Niemi - 14; Juha Moksunen - 11; Ari Koponen - 10; Olli Tyrväinen - 7 Roy Malminheimo - 0	Hungary - 22; József Petrikovics - 6 Zoltán Adorján - 6 László Bódi - 5 János Balogh - 4 Sándor Tihanyi - 1	New Zealand - 12; Larry Ross - 7 David Bargh - 3 Kym Mauger - 1 Derek MacKay - 1

Round 2

- 10 August 1986
- (Finland) Eteläpuisto, Tampere

First	Second	Third	Fourth
Finland - 41; Kai Niemi - 12; Juha Moksunen - 10; Olli Tyrväinen - 9 Vesa Ylinen - 7 Ari Koponen - 3	Italy - 32; Armando Castagna - 10; Paolo Salvatelli - 8 Armando Dal Chiele - 7 Mariano Castagna - 6 Valentino Furlanetto - 1	Hungary - 30; József Petrikovics - 11; László Bódi - 10; János Balogh - 7 Atilla Kovacs - 2 Zoltán Hajdú - 0	New Zealand - 17; David Bargh - 11; Larry Ross - 6 Alan Mason - 0 Kym Mauger - 0

Round 3

- 7 September 1986
- (Hungary) Gázvezeték Street Sports Complex, Debrecen

First	Second	Third	Fourth
Hungary - 35; Sándor Tihanyi - 13; József Petrikovics - 8 János Balogh - 6 Antal Kocso - 6 László Bódi - 2	Finland - 31; Kai Niemi - 11; Ari Koponen - 9 Olli Tyrväinen - 6 Juha Moksunen - 5 Vesa Ylinen - 0	Italy - 29; Valentino Furlanetto - 8 Gianni Famari - 8 Armando Dal Chiele - 7 Paolo Salvatelli - 6 Ottoviano Righetto - 0	New Zealand - 24; Larry Ross - 11; David Bargh - 9 Alan Mason - 4 Derek MacKay - 0

== Group 2 ==
Day	Venue	Winner
Teams ranked 5–8
4 May	(West Germany) Krumbach	Australia
22 June	(Czechoslovakia) Žarnovica	Czechoslovakia
10 August	(West Germany) Norden	Czechoslovakia
6 September	(Poland) Leszno	Poland

- Winner promoted to Group 1 in 1987 ; 4th relegated to Group 3 in 1987

Round 1

- 4 May 1986
- (West Germany) Breitenthal Speedway Stadium, Krumbach

First	Second	Third	Fourth
Australia - 49; Phil Crump (3,3,3,-,2) - 11; Steve Regeling (3,3,3,1,3) - 13; Steve Baker (3,3,1,2,3) - 12; David Cheshire (1,3,3,3,1) - 11; Mark Carlson (-,-,-,2,-) - 2	Czechoslovakia - 29; Roman Matoušek (2,2,1,3,2) - 10; Antonín Kasper Jr. (2,1,0,-,2) - 5 Stanislav Urban (1,-,3,2,2) - 8 Petr Vandírek (1,0,-,3,0) - 4 Lubomír Jedek (-,0,2,X,-) - 2	West Germany - 22; Egon Müller (2,0,2,E,3) - 7 Karl Maier (0,1,0,3,3) - 7 Klaus Lausch (1,1,0,1,-) - 3 Gerd Riss (0,2,2,0,1) - 5 Hans Faltermeier (-,-,-,-,0) - 0	Poland - 20; Wojciech Żabiałowicz (0,1,1,1,1) - 4 Roman Jankowski (3,2,0,2,0) - 7 Andrzej Huszcza (0,0,1,0,1) - 2 Zenon Kasprzak (2,2,2,1,E) - 7 Maciej Jaworek - NS

Round 2

- 22 June 1986
- (Czechoslovakia) Speedway Žarnovica, Zarnovica

First	Second	Third	Fourth
Czechoslovakia - 33; Roman Matoušek - 9 Stanislav Urban - 9 Antonín Kasper Jr. - 8 Petr Vandírek - 6 Lubomír Jedek - 1	Poland - 32; Zenon Kasprzak - 12; Roman Jankowski - 9 Janusz Stachyra - 6 Maciej Jaworek - 4 Wojciech Żabiałowicz - 1	West Germany - 28; Karl Maier - 13; Gerd Riss - 10; Heinz Huber - 3 Hans Faltermeier - 2 Klaus Lausch - 0	Australia - 27; Steve Baker - 9 Steve Regeling - 7 Phil Crump - 7 Dave Jackson - 2 Alan Rivett - 2

Round 3

- 10 August 1986
- (West Germany) Motodrom Halbemond, Norden

First	Second	Third	Fourth
Czechoslovakia - 43; Antonín Kasper Jr. - 12; Stanislav Urban - 11; Petr Vandírek - 11; Lubomír Jedek - 11	Australia - 30; Steve Baker - 11; Steve Regeling - 7 Phil Crump - 7 Mark Fiora - 5	West Germany - 24; Karl Maier - 8 Klaus Lausch - 7 Gerd Riss - 6 Hans Faltermeier - 3 Peter Hehlert - 0	Poland - 22; Andrzej Huszcza - 7 Zenon Plech - 7 Roman Jankowski - 4 Zenon Kasprzak - 4

Round 4

- 6 September 1986
- (Poland) Alfred Smoczyk Stadium, Leszno

First	Second	Third	Fourth
Poland - 42; Andrzej Huszcza - 12; Ryszard Dołomisiewicz - 11; Zenon Kasprzak - 9 Roman Jankowski - 9 Grzegorz Dzikowski - 1	Czechoslovakia - 30; Lubomír Jedek - 7 Petr Vandírek - 7 Pavel Karnas - 7 Stanislav Urban - 6 Antonín Kasper Jr. - 3	Australia - 29; Steve Baker - 11; Steve Regeling - 7 Phil Crump - 7 Mark Fiora - 3 Dave Jackson - 1	West Germany - 18*; Gerd Riss - 9 Hans Faltermeier - 6 Klaus Lausch - 3 Michal Stachyra (guest) - 1

== World final group ==
Day	Venue	Winner
Teams ranked 1–4
7 August	(Sweden) Gothenburg	Denmark
8 August	(Denmark) Vojens	Denmark
17 August	(England) Bradford	Denmark

- 4th relegated to Group 2 in 1987

=== Round 1 ===
- 7 August 1986
- (Sweden) Ullevi, Gothenburg
- Att: 4,083
- Ref: Jorgen Jensen (Den)

Placing	Team / Rider name	Total	1	2	3	4	5	6	7	8	9	10	11	12	13	14	15	16	Pts	17	18	19	20
1	Denmark	39	0	3	4	6	8	8	11	14	17	20	21	24	26	29	30	30		33	34	37	39
1	(13) Erik Gundersen	11		3					3		3							0	9				2
1	(14) Hans Nielsen	10	0							3		3					1		7			3
1	(15) Tommy Knudsen	8			1			F						3		3			7		1
1	(16) Jan O. Pedersen	10				2	2						1		2				7	3
1	(20) John Jørgensen	0																	0
2	Sweden	35	3	4	5	7	8	10	12	13	14	16	19	20	22	25	28	29		29	32	34	35
2	(5) Jan Andersson	11	3					2					3					1	9			2
2	(6) Jimmy Nilsen	9		1			1							1			3		6		3
2	(7) Per Jonsson	10				2			2			2				3			9				1
2	(8) Tommy Nilsson	5			1					1	1				2				5	0
2	(18) Erik Stenlund	0																	0
3	England	29	1	3	6	9	12	13	13	14	15	15	17	17	18	19	21	24		26	28	29	29
3	(1) Simon Wigg	7				3				1				E				3	7				0
3	(2) Neil Evitts	8			3				0				2				2		7			1
3	(3) Jeremy Doncaster	2		2				-				0			-				2	-
3	(4) Chris Morton	8	1				3				1					1			6		2
3	(17) Kelvin Tatum	4						1							1				2	2
4	United States	17	2	2	2	2	2	5	7	7	7	9	9	11	11	11	11	13		14	14	14	17
4	(9) Bobby Schwartz	4			0		0					2						2	4			0
4	(10) Sam Ermolenko	3				0		3			0						F		3		0
4	(11) Lance King	1		0						E			0			0			0	1
4	(12) Shawn Moran	9	2						2					2	0				6				3
4	(19) Rick Miller	0																	0
Placing	Team / Rider name	Total	1	2	3	4	5	6	7	8	9	10	11	12	13	14	15	16	Pts	17	18	19	20

M - exclusion for exceeding two-minute time allowance • T - exclusion for touching the tapes • X - other exclusion • E - retired or mechanical failure • F - fell

Helmet colours were permanent for each team (Red, Blue, White and Yellow/Black). Colours in diagrams indicate gate positions:
gate A – inside	gate B	gate C	gate D – outside

=== Round 2 ===
- 8 August 1986
- (Denmark) Speedway Center, Vojens
- Att: 13,000
- Ref: C Ringstrom (Swe)

Placing	Team / Rider name	Total	1	2	3	4	5	6	7	8	9	10	11	12	13	14	15	16	Pts	17	18	19	20
1	Denmark	48	3	6	9	10	13	16	18	19	21	24	27	30	31	34	36	39		41	44	46	48
1	(5) Erik Gundersen	14	3					3					3					3	12				2
1	(6) Hans Nielsen	13		3			3							3			2		11			2
1	(7) Tommy Knudsen	12				1			2			3				3			9		3
1	(8) Jan O. Pedersen	1			-					1	-				-				1	-
1	(18) John Jørgensen	8			3						2				1				6	2
2	United States	29	2	4	4	6	6	8	11	13	14	14	14	15	18	19	22	22		23	25	28	29
2	(9) Bobby Schwartz	0			F		E					-						-	0	-
2	(10) Sam Ermolenko	11				2		2			1						3		8			3
2	(11) Lance King	7		2						2			F			1			5		2
2	(12) Shawn Moran	10	2						3					1	3				9				1
2	(19) Rick Miller	1										0						0	0	1
3	England	23	1	1	1	1	3	4	4	7	7	8	9	11	11	13	14	16		19	20	20	23
3	(1) Simon Wigg	10				0				3				2				2	7				3
3	(2) Neil Evitts	0				X			0				-				-		0		-
3	(3) Jeremy Doncaster	1		0				1				-			0				1	-
3	(4) Chris Morton	5	1				2				0					2			5			0
3	(17) Kelvin Tatum	7										1	1				1		3	3	1
4	Sweden	19	0	1	3	6	7	7	8	8	11	13	15	15	17	17	17	18		18	18	19	19
4	(13) Jan Andersson	7		1					1		3							1	6			1
4	(14) Jimmy Nilsen	2	0							0		2					F		2		0
4	(15) Tommy Nilsson	2			2			0						-		0			2	-
4	(16) Per Jonsson	8				3	1						2		2				8				0
4	(20) Erik Stenlund	0												F					0	0
Placing	Team / Rider name	Total	1	2	3	4	5	6	7	8	9	10	11	12	13	14	15	16	Pts	17	18	19	20

M - exclusion for exceeding two-minute time allowance • T - exclusion for touching the tapes • X - other exclusion • E - retired or mechanical failure • F - fell

Helmet colours were permanent for each team (Red, Blue, White and Yellow/Black). Colours in diagrams indicate gate positions:
gate A – inside	gate B	gate C	gate D – outside

=== Round 3 ===
- 17 August 1986
- (England) Odsal Stadium, Bradford
- Att: 3,585
- Ref: R Randborg (Swe)

Placing	Team / Rider name	Total	1	2	3	4	5	6	7	8	9	10	11	12	13	14	15	16	Pts	17	18	19	20
1	Denmark	42	3	3	5	7	8	11	14	17	20	23	23	26	29	31	33	35		38	38	41	42
1	(13) Erik Gundersen	8		0					3		3							2	8		E
1	(14) Hans Nielsen	12	3							3		3					2		11				1
1	(15) Tommy Knudsen	13			2			3						3		2			10			3
1	(16) Jan O. Pedersen	9				2	1						0		3				6	3
1	(20) John Jørgensen	0																	0
2	United States	30	0	3	4	5	8	10	11	11	13	15	17	17	18	18	21	21		22	25	27	30
2	(1) Bobby Schwartz	1				1				0				0				-	1	-
2	(2) Sam Ermolenko	9			1				1				2				3		7			2
2	(3) Lance King	11		3				2				2			1				8				3
2	(4) Shawn Moran	8	0				3				2					F			5		3
2	(17) Rick Miller	1																0	0	1
3	England	29	1	3	6	9	11	11	11	12	13	13	16	17	17	20	21	24		26	28	29	29
3	(5) Simon Wigg	7	1					0					3					3	7				E
3	(6) Chris Morton	7		2			2							1			1		6			1
3	(7) Kelvin Tatum	8				3			0			F				3			6		2
3	(8) Jeremy Doncaster	7			3					1	1				-				5	2
3	(18) Marvyn Cox	0													0				0
4	Sweden	19	2	3	3	3	3	4	6	8	8	9	10	12	14	15	15	16		16	17	17	19
4	(9) Per Jonsson	3			0		0					1						1	2		1
4	(10) Erik Stenlund	1				E		1			-						0		1	-
4	(11) Jimmy Nilsen	5		1						2			1			1			5			0
4	(12) Jan Andersson	10	2						2					2	2				8				2
4	(19) Tony Olsson	0									0								0	0
Placing	Team / Rider name	Total	1	2	3	4	5	6	7	8	9	10	11	12	13	14	15	16	Pts	17	18	19	20

M - exclusion for exceeding two-minute time allowance • T - exclusion for touching the tapes • X - other exclusion • E - retired or mechanical failure • F - fell

Helmet colours were permanent for each team (Red, Blue, White and Yellow/Black). Colours in diagrams indicate gate positions:
gate A – inside	gate B	gate C	gate D – outside

=== Final standings ===
Pos	Team	1st	2nd	3rd	4th	Match Pts	Table Pts
1	Denmark	3	0	0	0	129	9
2	United States	0	2	0	1	76	4
3	England	0	0	3	0	81	3
4	Sweden	0	1	0	2	73	2

== See also ==
- 1986 Individual Speedway World Championship
- 1986 Speedway World Pairs Championship
