= 1985 Speedway World Team Cup =

26th edition of the annual motorcycle speedway World Cup competition

Seasons
- ← 1984 1986 →

The 1985 Speedway World Team Cup was the 26th edition of the FIM Speedway World Team Cup to determine the team world champions.

The final took place at the Veterans Memorial Stadium (Long Beach), in California, United States. Denmark won their third consecutive title (and fifth in total) surpassing Poland's four titles and moving into third place in the all-time list.

== Qualification stage 1 ==
Day	Venue	Winner
stage 1
12 May	(England) Bradford	England
12 May	(Norway) Skien	Denmark
12 May	(Italy) Civitanova	Czechoslovakia
12 May	(West Germany) Olching	West Germany
22 May	(Poland) Gorzów	Poland

=== Commonwealth round ===
- 12 May 12, 1985
- (England) Odsal Stadium, Bradford
- Att: 8,000
- Ref: J M Price (GB)

* 1st & 2nd to Intercontinental Final

Placing	Team / Rider name	Total	1	2	3	4	5	6	7	8	9	10	11	12	13	14	15	16	Pts	17	18	19	20
1	England	42	2	5	8	11	13	15	16	19	22	25	28	31	34	37	40	42		42	42	42	42
1	(13) Phil Collins	9		3					1		3							2	9
1	(14) Kenny Carter	11	2							3		3					3		11
1	(15) Jeremy Doncaster	11			3			2						3		3			11
1	(16) Kelvin Tatum	11				3	2						3		3				11
1	(20) Chris Morton	0																	0
2	Australia	21	3	5	6	7	7	10	12	12	12	13	15	17	18	20	21	21		21	21	21	21
2	(5) Phil Crump	8	3					3					2					0	8
2	(6) Steve Regeling	5		2			E							2			1		5
2	(7) Steve Baker	6				1			2			1				2			6
2	(8) Rod Hunter	1			1					0	-				-				1
2	(18) Stan Bear	1									E				1				1
3	New Zealand	17	0	1	1	1	2	3	6	8	10	10	11	12	14	14	16	17		17	17	17	17
3	(1) Ivan Mauger	4				0				2				1				1	4
3	(2) Mitch Shirra	6			T				3				1				2		6
3	(3) Larry Ross	4		1				1				0			2				4
3	(4) Kym Mauger	1	0				1				-					-			1
3	(17) Alan Mason	2									2					0			2
4	Finland	16	1	1	3	5	8	8	8	9	10	12	12	12	12	13	13	16		16	16	16	16
4	(9) Kai Niemi	10			2		3					2						3	10
4	(10) Ari Koponen	3				2		0			1						0		3
4	(11) Olli Tyrväinen	2		0						1			0			1			2
4	(12) Juha Moksunen	1	1						0					0	0				1
4	(19) Aki Ala-Riihimaki	0																	0
Placing	Team / Rider name	Total	1	2	3	4	5	6	7	8	9	10	11	12	13	14	15	16	Pts	17	18	19	20

M - exclusion for exceeding two-minute time allowance • T - exclusion for touching the tapes • X - other exclusion • E - retired or mechanical failure • F - fell

Helmet colours were permanent for each team (Red, Blue, White and Yellow/Black). Colours in diagrams indicate gate positions:
gate A – inside	gate B	gate C	gate D – outside

=== Scandinavian round ===
- 12 May 1985
- (Norway) Geiteryggen Speedwaybane, Skien

* 1st & 2nd to Intercontinental Final

1st	2nd	3rd	4th
Denmark - 43; Erik Gundersen - 12; Bo Petersen - 12; Preben Eriksen - 11; Jan O. Pedersen - 5 Tommy Knudsen - 3	Sweden - 33; Jan Andersson - 10; Tommy Nilsson - 8 Per Jonsson - 6 Jimmy Nilsen - 6 Pierre Brannefors - 3	Netherlands - 11; Frits Koppe - 5 Henny Kroeze - 3 Henk Steman - 3 Leo Bathoorn - 0 Wil Stroes - 0	Norway - 8 Dag Haaland - 3 Einar Kyllingstad - 2 Roy Otto - 2 Ingvar Skogland - 1 Arnt Førland - 0

=== Continental round ===
- 12 May 1985
- (Italy) San Savino Speedway Park, Civitanova Marche

* 1st & 2nd to Continental Semi-Final

1st	2nd	3rd	4th
Czechoslovakia - 36; Václav Verner - 12; Antonín Kasper Jr. - 10; Aleš Dryml Sr. - 9 Zdenek Schneiderwind - 5	Italy - 35; Armando Castagna - 10; Armando Dal Chiele - 9 Ottaviano Righetto - 8 Giorgio Zaramella - 8	Hungary - 24; Zoltán Adorján - 8 Sándor Tihanyi - 6 Zoltan Hajdu - 5 Istvan Bodi - 4 Zsolt Papp - 1	Yugoslavia - 1 Zvonko Pavlic - 1 Zvone Gerjevic - 0 Artur Horvat - 0 Franc Zagar - 0 Joze Zibert - 0

- 12 May 1985
- (West Germany) Olching Speedwaybahn, Olching
- Att: 6,000

* 1st & 2nd to Continental Semi-Final

1st	2nd	3rd	4th
West Germany - 46; Klaus Lausch - 12; Karl Maier - 12; Egon Müller - 8 Peter Wurtele - 8 Gerd Riss - 6	Poland - 29; Maciej Jaworek - 8 Wojciech Żabiałowicz - 8 Andrzej Huszcza - 6 Jerzy Rembas - 4 Zenon Plech - 3	Austria - 16; Heinrich Schatzer - 7 Toni Pilotto - 6 Siegfried Eder - 2 Adi Funk - 1	Bulgaria - 5 Nikolai Manev - 2 Stanislav Tzankov - 2 Vesselin Markov - 1 Angel Eftimov - 0 Orlin Janakiev - 0

Semifinal

- 22 May 1985
- (Poland) Edward Jancarz Stadium, Gorzów
- Att: 18,000

* 1st & 2nd to Continental Final

Placing	Team / Rider name	Total	1	2	3	4	5	6	7	8	9	10	11	12	13	14	15	16	Pts	17	18	19	20
1	Poland	31	2	4	5	7	10	12	13	15	17	19	20	22	25	28	31	31		31	31	31	31
1	(5) Jerzy Rembas	3	2					-					1					-	3
1	(6) Andrzej Huszcza	10		2			3							2			3		10
1	(7) Zenon Plech	3				2			1			-				-			3
1	(8) Grzegorz Dzikowski	8			1					2	2				3				8
1	(18) Piotr Pyszny	7						2				2				3		F	7
2	Czechoslovakia	29	0	0	2	5	7	8	8	11	12	15	18	21	23	25	26	29		29	29	29	29
2	(1) Antonín Kasper Jr.	12				3				3				3				3	12
2	(2) Václav Verner	6			2				0				3				1		6
2	(3) Lubomir Jedek	0		0				-				-			-				0
2	(4) Aleš Dryml Sr.	3	0				2				1					-			3
2	(17) Jiří Štancl	8						1				3			2	2			8
3	West Germany	23	3	6	9	10	10	13	16	17	20	21	21	21	21	22	22	23		23	23	23	23
3	(9) Egon Muller	4			3		E					1						-	4
3	(10) Karl Maier	7				1		3			3						E		7
3	(11) Klaus Lausch	5		3						1			0			1			5
3	(12) Peter Wurtele	6	3						3					0	-				6
3	(19) Georg Hack	1													0			1	1
4	Italy	13	1	2	2	2	3	3	5	5	5	5	7	8	9	9	11	13		13	13	13	13
4	(13) Armando Castagna	5		1					2		0							2	5
4	(14) Armando Dal Chiele	1	1							F		-					-		1
4	(15) Giorgio Zaramella	1			0			0						1		E			1
4	(16) Ottaviano Righetto	3				0	-						2		1				3
4	(20) Valentino Furlanetto	3					1					0					2		3
Placing	Team / Rider name	Total	1	2	3	4	5	6	7	8	9	10	11	12	13	14	15	16	Pts	17	18	19	20

M - exclusion for exceeding two-minute time allowance • T - exclusion for touching the tapes • X - other exclusion • E - retired or mechanical failure • F - fell

Helmet colours were permanent for each team (Red, Blue, White and Yellow/Black). Colours in diagrams indicate gate positions:
gate A – inside	gate B	gate C	gate D – outside

== Qualification stage 2 ==
Day	Venue	Winner
Stage 2
22 June	(Denmark) Vojens	Denmark
7 July	(West Germany) Neustadt	Sweden

=== Intercontinental Final ===
- 22 June 1985
- DEN Speedway Center, Vojens
- Att: 12,000
- Ref: Mel Price

* Winner to Final; 2nd & 3rd to Continental Final

Placing	Team / Rider name	Total	1	2	3	4	5	6	7	8	9	10	11	12	13	14	15	16	Pts	17	18	19	20
1	Denmark	37	3	5	8	11	13	14	17	20	23	26	29	31	34	36	37	37		37	37	37	37
1	(5) Bo Petersen	7	3					1					3					X	7
1	(6) Preben Eriksen	7		2			2							2			1		7
1	(7) Tommy Knudsen	11				3			3			3				2			11
1	(8) Erik Gundersen	12			3					3	3				3				12
1	(18) John Jørgensen	0																	0
2	England	27	0	3	5	7	10	13	14	16	17	19	20	20	20	23	25	27		27	27	27	27
2	(9) Kelvin Tatum	9			2		3					2						2	9
2	(10) Chris Morton	8				2		3			1						2		8
2	(11) Jeremy Doncaster	9		3						2			1			3			9
2	(12) Kenny Carter	1				E			1					0	-				1
2	(19) Phil Collins	0													X				0
3	Sweden	19	1	2	3	3	4	6	8	9	11	11	11	14	16	16	16	19		19	19	19	19
3	(13) Jan Andersson	8		1					2		2							3	8
3	(14) Jimmy Nilsen	2	1							1		0					-		2
3	(15) Tommy Nilsson	6			1			2						3		0			6
3	(16) Per Jonsson	1				0	1						0		-				1
3	(20) Pierre Brannefors	2													2		0		2
4	Australia	13	2	2	2	3	3	3	3	3	3	4	6	7	8	9	12	13		13	13	13	13
4	(1) Phil Crump	2				1				0				1				-	2
4	(2) Steve Regeling	5			F				0				2				3		5
4	(3) Steve Baker	1		0				0				-			1				1
4	(4) Rod Hunter	3	2				0				0					1			3
4	(17) Stan Bear	2										1						1	2
Placing	Team / Rider name	Total	1	2	3	4	5	6	7	8	9	10	11	12	13	14	15	16	Pts	17	18	19	20

M - exclusion for exceeding two-minute time allowance • T - exclusion for touching the tapes • X - other exclusion • E - retired or mechanical failure • F - fell

Helmet colours were permanent for each team (Red, Blue, White and Yellow/Black). Colours in diagrams indicate gate positions:
gate A – inside	gate B	gate C	gate D – outside

=== Continental Final ===
- 7 July 1985
- (West Germany) Anton Treffer Stadion, Neustadt
- Att: 8,000

* 1st & 2nd to Final

Placing	Team / Rider name	Total	1	2	3	4	5	6	7	8	9	10	11	12	13	14	15	16	Pts	17	18	19	20
1	Sweden	40	1	4	5	8	10	13	16	19	22	24	27	30	32	35	37	40		40	40	40	40
1	(5) Jan Andersson	10	1					3					3					3	10
1	(6) Tommy Nilsson	10		3			2							3			2		10
1	(7) Jimmy Nilsen	11				3			3			2				3			11
1	(8) Per Jonsson	9			1					3	3				2				9
1	(18) Pierre Brannefors	0																	0
2	England	31	2	2	5	5	6	8	10	12	14	17	19	21	24	26	29	31		31	31	31	31
2	(13) Phil Collins	4		-					2		2							-	4
2	(14) Kenny Carter	10	2							2		3					3		10
2	(15) Jeremy Doncaster	9			3			2						2		2			9
2	(16) Kelvin Tatum	1				F	1						-		-				1
2	(20) Chris Morton	7		F									2		3			2	7
3	Czechoslovakia	17	3	3	5	7	7	8	8	9	10	11	12	13	14	15	16	17		17	17	17	17
3	(9) Antonín Kasper Jr.	4			2		0					1						1	4
3	(10) Lubomir Jedek	4				2		-			1						1		4
3	(11) Aleš Dryml Sr.	3		X						1			1			1			3
3	(12) Václav Verner	4	3						0					1	-				4
3	(19) Jiří Štancl	2						1							1				2
4	Poland	7	0	2	2	3	6	6	7	7	7	7	7	7	7	7	7	7		7	7	7	7
4	(1) Zenon Plech	1				1				-				0				0	1
4	(2) Wojciech Żabiałowicz	1			0				1				0				-		1
4	(3) Grzegorz Dzikowski	2		2				F				0			0				2
4	(4) Andrzej Huszcza	3	0				3				0					0			3
4	(17) Maciej Jaworek	0								0							0		0
Placing	Team / Rider name	Total	1	2	3	4	5	6	7	8	9	10	11	12	13	14	15	16	Pts	17	18	19	20

M - exclusion for exceeding two-minute time allowance • T - exclusion for touching the tapes • X - other exclusion • E - retired or mechanical failure • F - fell

Helmet colours were permanent for each team (Red, Blue, White and Yellow/Black). Colours in diagrams indicate gate positions:
gate A – inside	gate B	gate C	gate D – outside

== World Final ==
- 10 August 1985
- (United States) Long Beach, Veterans Memorial Stadium
- Att: 18,000

Placing	Team / Rider name	Total	1	2	3	4	5	6	7	8	9	10	11	12	13	14	15	16	Pts	17	18	19	20
1	Denmark	37	0	3	5	7	10	12	15	18	20	22	25	28	31	34	37	37		37	37	37	37
1	(5) Bo Petersen	0	F					-					-					-	0
1	(6) Tommy Knudsen	12		3			3							3			3		12
1	(7) Erik Gundersen	10				2			3			2				3			10
1	(8) Hans Nielsen	10			2					3	2				3				10
1	(18) Preben Eriksen	5						2					3					0	5
2	United States	35	3	4	7	10	12	15	17	17	20	23	25	27	29	30	32	35		35	35	35	35
2	(9) Shawn Moran	11			3		2					3						3	11
2	(10) Bobby Schwartz	11				3		3			3						2		11
2	(11) John Cook	1		1						F			-			-			1
2	(12) Lance King	9	3						2					2	2				9
2	(19) Sam Ermolenko	3											2			1			3
3	England	13	0	2	2	2	2	3	4	5	6	7	8	8	9	11	11	13		13	13	13	13
3	(13) Jeremy Doncaster	6		2					1		1							2	6
3	(14) Phil Collins	2	T							1		1					0		2
3	(15) Kelvin Tatum	3			0			1						0		2			3
3	(16) Richard Knight	2				0	-						1		1				2
3	(20) John Davis	0					0												0
4	Sweden	10	2	2	3	4	5	5	5	7	7	7	7	8	8	8	9	10		10	10	10	10
4	(1) Jan Andersson	5				1				2				1				1	5
4	(2) Jimmy Nilsen	2			1				0				0				1		2
4	(3) Per Jonsson	0		0				0				-			-				0
4	(4) Tommy Nilsson	3	2				1				0					0			3
4	(17) Pierre Brannefors	0										X			0				0
Placing	Team / Rider name	Total	1	2	3	4	5	6	7	8	9	10	11	12	13	14	15	16	Pts	17	18	19	20

M - exclusion for exceeding two-minute time allowance • T - exclusion for touching the tapes • X - other exclusion • E - retired or mechanical failure • F - fell

Helmet colours were permanent for each team (Red, Blue, White and Yellow/Black). Colours in diagrams indicate gate positions:
gate A – inside	gate B	gate C	gate D – outside

== See also ==
- 1985 Individual Speedway World Championship
- 1985 Speedway World Pairs Championship
