= 1981 Speedway World Team Cup =

22nd edition of the annual motorcycle speedway World Cup competition

Seasons
- ← 1980 1982 →

The 1981 Speedway World Team Cup was the 22nd edition of the FIM Speedway World Team Cup to determine the team world champions.

The final took place at the Olching Speedwaybahn in Olching, West Germany. Denmark won their second title. Ominously for the rest of the world the team contained a youthful Hans Nielsen and Erik Gundersen.

== Qualification stage 1 ==
| Day | Venue | Winner |
Stage 1
| 17 May | (England) Reading | England |
| 17 May | (West Germany) Brokstedt | West Germany |
| 17 May | (Hungary) Debrecen | (Soviet Union) USSR |
| 28 May | (Finland) Tampere | Denmark |
| 26 June | (Italy) Badia Polesine | (Soviet Union) USSR |

=== Commonwealth round ===
- 17 May
- (England) Smallmead Stadium, Reading
- Referee: (Sweden) C. Ringstrom
- Att: 7,000

| Placing | Team / Rider name | Total | 1 | 2 | 3 | 4 | 5 | 6 | 7 | 8 | 9 | 10 | 11 | 12 | 13 | 14 | 15 | 16 | Pts | 17 | 18 | 19 | 20 |
| 1 | England | 36 | 3 | 5 | 8 | 9 | 11 | 13 | 15 | 17 | 19 | 22 | 24 | 27 | 30 | 33 | 34 | 36 | | 36 | 36 | 36 | 36 |
| 1 | (9) Dave Jessup | 10 | | | 3 | | 2 | | | | | 3 | | | | | | 2 | 10 |
| 1 | (10) Gordon Kennett | 6 | | | | 1 | | 2 | | | 2 | | | | | | 1 | | 6 |
| 1 | (11) Chris Morton | 9 | | 2 | | | | | | 2 | | | 2 | | | 3 | | | 9 |
| 1 | (12) Michael Lee | 11 | 3 | | | | | | 2 | | | | | 3 | 3 | | | | 11 |
| 1 | (19) John Davis | 0 | | | | | | | | | | | | | | | | | 0 |
| 2 | United States | 32 | 2 | 5 | 7 | 9 | 10 | 13 | 13 | 16 | 17 | 18 | 21 | 22 | 24 | 26 | 29 | 32 | | 32 | 32 | 32 | 32 |
| 2 | (5) Bruce Penhall | 11 | 2 | | | | | 3 | | | | | 3 | | | | | 3 | 11 |
| 2 | (6) Bobby Schwartz | 8 | | 3 | | | 1 | | | | | | | 1 | | | 3 | | 8 |
| 2 | (7) Dennis Sigalos | 3 | | | | 2 | | | F | | | 1 | | | | - | | | 3 |
| 2 | (8) Scott Autrey | 8 | | | 2 | | | | | 3 | 1 | | | | 2 | | | | 8 |
| 2 | (18) Kelly Moran | 2 | | | | | | | | | | | | | | 2 | | | 2 |
| 3 | Australia | 20 | 1 | 1 | 1 | 4 | 7 | 8 | 11 | 12 | 12 | 14 | 15 | 17 | 17 | 17 | 19 | 20 | | 20 | 20 | 20 | 20 |
| 3 | (13) Phil Crump | 4 | | 0 | | | | | 3 | | 0 | | | | | | | 1 | 4 |
| 3 | (14) John Titman | 6 | 1 | | | | | | | 1 | | 2 | | | | | 2 | | 6 |
| 3 | (15) Danny Kennedy | 0 | | | 0 | | | - | | | | | | - | | X | | | 0 |
| 3 | (16) Billy Sanders | 7 | | | | 3 | 3 | | | | | | 1 | | 0 | | | | 7 |
| 3 | (20) Gary Guglielmi | 3 | | | | | | 1 | | | | | | 2 | | | | | 3 |
| 4 | New Zealand | 8 | 0 | 1 | 2 | 2 | 2 | 2 | 3 | 3 | 6 | 6 | 6 | 6 | 7 | 8 | 8 | 8 | | 8 | 8 | 8 | 8 |
| 4 | (1) Ivan Mauger | 0 | | | | 0 | | | | 0 | | | | 0 | | | | - | 0 |
| 4 | (2) Mitch Shirra | 2 | | | 1 | | | | 1 | | | | - | | | | 0 | | 2 |
| 4 | (3) Bruce Cribb | 1 | | 1 | | | | 0 | | | | 0 | | | - | | | | 1 |
| 4 | (4) Larry Ross | 1 | 0 | | | | 0 | | | | - | | | | | 1 | | | 1 |
| 4 | (17) Tony Briggs | 4 | | | | | | | | | 3 | | 0 | | 1 | | | 0 | 4 |
| Placing | Team / Rider name | Total | 1 | 2 | 3 | 4 | 5 | 6 | 7 | 8 | 9 | 10 | 11 | 12 | 13 | 14 | 15 | 16 | Pts | 17 | 18 | 19 | 20 |

M - exclusion for exceeding two-minute time allowance • T - exclusion for touching the tapes • X - other exclusion • E - retired or mechanical failure • F - fell

Helmet colours were permanent for each team (Red, Blue, White and Yellow/Black). Colours in diagrams indicate gate positions:
| gate A – inside | gate B | gate C | gate D – outside |

* England & USA to Intercontinental Final

=== Scandinavian round ===
- 28 May
- (Finland) Eteläpuisto, Tampere

| 1st | 2nd | 3rd | 4th |
|---|---|---|---|
| Denmark - 37; Hans Nielsen - 11; Bo Petersen - 10; Erik Gundersen - 8 Tommy Knudsen - 8 | Sweden - 30; Jan Andersson - 10; Hans Danielsson - 8 Richard Hellsen - 6 Tommy Nilsson - 6 | Finland - 19; Ari Koponen - 5 Kai Niemi - 5 Olli Tyrväinen - 4 Pekka Hautamaki - 3 Veijo Tuoriniemi - 2 | Norway - 10; Rolf Gramstad - 8 Dag Haaland - 2 Jorn Haugvalstad - 0 Yngve Madland - 0 Roy Otto - 0 |

* Denmark & Sweden to Intercontinental Final

=== Continental round ===
- 17 May
- (West Germany) Holsteinring, Brokstedt

| Placing | Team / Rider name | Total | 1 | 2 | 3 | 4 | 5 | 6 | 7 | 8 | 9 | 10 | 11 | 12 | 13 | 14 | 15 | 16 | Pts | 17 | 18 | 19 | 20 |
| 1 | West Germany | 43 | 2 | 5 | 8 | 11 | 11 | 14 | 17 | 20 | 23 | 26 | 29 | 32 | 34 | 37 | 40 | 43 | | 43 | 43 | 43 | 43 |
| 1 | (13) Egon Müller | 12 | | 3 | | | | | 3 | | 3 | | | | | | | 3 | 12 |
| 1 | (14) Georg Hack | 11 | 2 | | | | | | | 3 | | 3 | | | | | 3 | | 11 |
| 1 | (15) Alois Wiesböck | 12 | | | 3 | | | 3 | | | | | | 3 | | 3 | | | 12 |
| 1 | (16) Georg Gilgenreiner | 8 | | | | 3 | 0 | | | | | | 3 | | 2 | | | | 8 |
| 1 | (20) Waldemar Bacik | 0 | | | | | | | | | | | | | | | | | 0 |
| 2 | (Netherlands) Nederlands | 24 | 3 | 5 | 7 | 9 | 12 | 12 | 14 | 16 | 16 | 18 | 19 | 19 | 19 | 20 | 22 | 24 | | 24 | 24 | 24 | 24 |
| 2 | (9) Henny Kroeze | 9 | | | 2 | | 3 | | | | | 2 | | | | | | 2 | 9 |
| 2 | (10) Frits Koppe | 4 | | | | 2 | | 0 | | | - | | | | | | 2 | | 4 |
| 2 | (11) Rudi Muts | 6 | | 2 | | | | | | 2 | | | 1 | | | 1 | | | 6 |
| 2 | (12) Henk Steman | 5 | 3 | | | | | | 2 | | | | | 0 | 0 | | | | 5 |
| 2 | (19) Wil Stroes | 0 | | | | | | | | | 0 | | | | | | | | 0 |
| 3 | Austria | 22 | 0 | 1 | 2 | 3 | 5 | 7 | 8 | 8 | 10 | 11 | 13 | 15 | 18 | 20 | 21 | 22 | | 22 | 22 | 22 | 22 |
| 3 | (1) Adi Funk | 4 | | | | 1 | | | | 0 | | | | 2 | | | | 1 | 4 |
| 3 | (2) Herbert Szerecs | 5 | | | 1 | | | | 1 | | | | 2 | | | | 1 | | 5 |
| 3 | (3) Walter Grubmuler | 7 | | 1 | | | | 2 | | | | 1 | | | 3 | | | | 7 |
| 3 | (4) Heinrich Schatzer | 6 | 0 | | | | 2 | | | | 2 | | | | | 2 | | | 6 |
| 3 | (17) Robert Funk | 0 | | | | | | | | | | | | | | | | | 0 |
| 4 | Bulgaria | 7 | 1 | 1 | 1 | 1 | 2 | 3 | 3 | 4 | 5 | 5 | 5 | 6 | 7 | 7 | 7 | 7 | | 7 | 7 | 7 | 7 |
| 4 | (5) Nikolai Manev | 2 | 1 | | | | | 1 | | | | | 0 | | | | | 0 | 2 |
| 4 | (6) Orlin Janakiev | 2 | | 0 | | | 1 | | | | | | | 1 | | | 0 | | 2 |
| 4 | (7) Veselin Markov | 0 | | | | 0 | | | 0 | | | 0 | | | | 0 | | | 0 |
| 4 | (8) Angel Eftimov | 3 | | | 0 | | | | | 1 | 1 | | | | 1 | | | | 3 |
| 4 | (18) Zachari Zachariev | 0 | | | | | | | | | | | | | | | | | 0 |
| Placing | Team / Rider name | Total | 1 | 2 | 3 | 4 | 5 | 6 | 7 | 8 | 9 | 10 | 11 | 12 | 13 | 14 | 15 | 16 | Pts | 17 | 18 | 19 | 20 |

M - exclusion for exceeding two-minute time allowance • T - exclusion for touching the tapes • X - other exclusion • E - retired or mechanical failure • F - fell

Helmet colours were permanent for each team (Red, Blue, White and Yellow/Black). Colours in diagrams indicate gate positions:
| gate A – inside | gate B | gate C | gate D – outside |

* West Germany & Netherlands to Continental Semi-Final

- 17 May
- (Hungary) Gázvezeték Street Sports Complex, Debrecen

| Placing | Team / Rider name | Total | 1 | 2 | 3 | 4 | 5 | 6 | 7 | 8 | 9 | 10 | 11 | 12 | 13 | 14 | 15 | 16 | Pts | 17 | 18 | 19 | 20 |
| 1 | Soviet Union | 39 | 2 | 5 | 7 | 9 | 12 | 14 | 16 | 19 | 22 | 24 | 27 | 29 | 31 | 33 | 36 | 39 | | 39 | 39 | 39 | 39 |
| 1 | (1) Mikhail Starostin | 10 | | | | 2 | | | | 3 | | | | 2 | | | | 3 | 10 |
| 1 | (2) Grigory Khlinovsky | 10 | | | 2 | | | | 2 | | | | 3 | | | | 3 | | 10 |
| 1 | (3) Valery Gordeev | 9 | | 3 | | | | 2 | | | | 2 | | | 2 | | | | 9 |
| 1 | (4) Viktor Kuznetsov | 10 | 2 | | | | 3 | | | | 3 | | | | | 2 | | | 10 |
| 1 | (17) Anatoly Maksimov | 0 | | | | | | | | | | | | | | | | | 0 |
| 2 | Hungary | 37 | 3 | 5 | 8 | 9 | 11 | 14 | 17 | 19 | 21 | 24 | 26 | 27 | 30 | 33 | 35 | 37 | | 37 | 37 | 37 | 37 |
| 2 | (13) Zoltan Hajdu | 9 | | 2 | | | | | 3 | | 2 | | | | | | | 2 | 9 |
| 2 | (14) Istvan Sziraczki | 10 | 3 | | | | | | | 2 | | 3 | | | | | 2 | | 10 |
| 2 | (15) Zoltán Adorján | 10 | | | 3 | | | 3 | | | | | | 1 | | 3 | | | 10 |
| 2 | (16) Ferenc Farkash | 3 | | | | 1 | - | | | | | | 2 | | - | | | | 3 |
| 2 | (20) Janos Oresko | 5 | | | | | 2 | | | | | | | | 3 | | | | 5 |
| 3 | Italy | 14 | 1 | 2 | 3 | 6 | 6 | 7 | 8 | 9 | 9 | 10 | 11 | 11 | 12 | 13 | 14 | 14 | | 14 | 14 | 14 | 14 |
| 3 | (9) Mauro Ferraccioli | 1 | | | 1 | | 0 | | | | | - | | | | | | 0 | 1 |
| 3 | (10) Giuseppe Marzotto | 5 | | | | 3 | | 1 | | | 0 | | | | | | 1 | | 5 |
| 3 | (11) Armando Dal Chiele | 3 | | 1 | | | | | | 1 | | | 1 | | | - | | | 3 |
| 3 | (12) Giovanni Brizzolari | 3 | 1 | | | | | | 1 | | | | | 0 | 1 | | | | 3 |
| 3 | (19) Gianni Famari | 2 | | | | | | | | | | 1 | | | | 1 | | | 2 |
| 4 | (Socialist Federal Republic of Yugoslavia) Yugoslavia | 6 | 0 | 0 | 0 | 0 | 1 | 1 | 1 | 1 | 2 | 2 | 2 | 5 | 5 | 5 | 5 | 6 | | 6 | 6 | 6 | 6 |
| 4 | (5) Vlado Kocuvan | 1 | 0 | | | | | 0 | | | | | 0 | | | | | 1 | 1 |
| 4 | (6) Stefan Kekec | 4 | | 0 | | | 1 | | | | | | | 3 | | | 0 | | 4 |
| 4 | (7) Darko Tominac | 0 | | | | 0 | | | 0 | | | - | | | | 0 | | | 0 |
| 4 | (8) Krešo Omerzel | 1 | | | - | | | | | - | 1 | | | | 0 | | | | 1 |
| 4 | (18) Ladislav Smidt | 0 | | | 0 | | | | | 0 | | 0 | | | | | | | 0 |
| Placing | Team / Rider name | Total | 1 | 2 | 3 | 4 | 5 | 6 | 7 | 8 | 9 | 10 | 11 | 12 | 13 | 14 | 15 | 16 | Pts | 17 | 18 | 19 | 20 |

M - exclusion for exceeding two-minute time allowance • T - exclusion for touching the tapes • X - other exclusion • E - retired or mechanical failure • F - fell

Helmet colours were permanent for each team (Red, Blue, White and Yellow/Black). Colours in diagrams indicate gate positions:
| gate A – inside | gate B | gate C | gate D – outside |

* Soviet Union & Hungary to Continental Semi-Final

Semifinal

- 28 June 28
- (Italy) Stadio Ottorino Verzaro, Badia Polesine

| 1st | 2nd | 3rd | 4th |
|---|---|---|---|
| Soviet Union - 33; Mikhail Starostin - 10; Viktor Kuznetsov - 9 Anatoly Maksimov - 9 Grigory Khlinovsky - 5 | West Germany - 32; Karl Maier - 11; Georg Hack - 10; Frits Bauer - 4 Georg Gilgenreiner - 3 Egon Müller - 3 | Hungary - 18; Istvan Sziraczki - 9 Ferenc Farkash - 4 Laszlo Meszaros - 2 Janos Oresko - 2 Zoltán Adorján - 1 | Netherlands - 13; Henny Kroeze - 5 Frits Koppe - 4 Rudi Muts - 2 Henk Steman - 2 |

* Soviet Union & West Germany to Continental Final

== Qualification stage 2 ==
| Day | Venue | Winner |
Stage 2
| 26 June | (England) King's Lynn | Denmark |
| 7 July | (Soviet Union) Leningrad | West Germany |

=== Continental Final ===
- 11 July
- (Soviet Union) Leningrad Speedway Stadium, Leningrad

| Placing | Team / Rider name | Total | 1 | 2 | 3 | 4 | 5 | 6 | 7 | 8 | 9 | 10 | 11 | 12 | 13 | 14 | 15 | 16 | Pts | 17 | 18 | 19 | 20 |
| 1 | West Germany | 32 | 2 | 4 | 5 | 6 | 6 | 9 | 12 | 15 | 18 | 19 | 22 | 25 | 26 | 26 | 29 | 32 | | 32 | 32 | 32 | 32 |
| 1 | (1) Karl Maier | 10 | | | | 1 | | | | 3 | | | | 3 | | | | 3 | 10 |
| 1 | (2) Alois Wiesböck | 1 | | | 1 | | | | - | | | | - | | | | - | | 1 |
| 1 | (3) Georg Hack | 7 | | 2 | | | | 3 | | | | 1 | | | 1 | | | | 7 |
| 1 | (4) Georg Gilgenreiner | 3 | - | | | | 0 | | | | 3 | | | | | 0 | | | 3 |
| 1 | (17) Egon Müller | 11 | 2 | | | | | | 3 | | | | 3 | | | | 3 | | 11 |
| 2 | Soviet Union | 27 | 3 | 6 | 9 | 11 | 13 | 14 | 15 | 17 | 17 | 19 | 21 | 21 | 23 | 24 | 26 | 27 | | 27 | 27 | 27 | 27 |
| 2 | (9) Grigory Khlinovsky | 8 | | | 3 | | 2 | | | | | 2 | | | | | | 1 | 8 |
| 2 | (10) Anatoly Maksimov | 5 | | | | 2 | | 1 | | | - | | | | | | 2 | | 5 |
| 2 | (11) Viktor Kuznetsov | 8 | | 3 | | | | | | 2 | | | 2 | | | 1 | | | 8 |
| 2 | (12) Mikhail Starostin | 6 | 3 | | | | | | 1 | | | | | X | 2 | | | | 6 |
| 2 | (19) Georgy Ivanov | 0 | | | | | | | | | 0 | | | | | | | | 0 |
| 3 | Czechoslovakia | 21 | 0 | 1 | 3 | 3 | 4 | 4 | 6 | 6 | 8 | 11 | 11 | 13 | 16 | 18 | 19 | 21 | | 21 | 21 | 21 | 21 |
| 3 | (13) Aleš Dryml Sr. | 7 | | 1 | | | | | 2 | | 2 | | | | | | | 2 | 7 |
| 3 | (14) Václav Verner | 4 | 0 | | | | | | | X | | 3 | | | | | 1 | | 4 |
| 3 | (15) Milan Špinka | 2 | | | 2 | | | F | | | | | | - | | - | | | 2 |
| 3 | (16) Zdeněk Kudrna | 0 | | | | 0 | - | | | | | | X | | - | | | | 0 |
| 3 | (20) Jiří Štancl | 8 | | | | | 1 | | | | | | | 2 | 3 | 2 | | | 8 |
| 4 | Poland | 14 | 1 | 1 | 1 | 4 | 7 | 9 | 9 | 9 | 10 | 10 | 11 | 11 | 11 | 14 | 14 | 14 | | 14 | 14 | 14 | 14 |
| 4 | (5) Edward Jancarz | 4 | 1 | | | | | 2 | | | | | 1 | | | | | 0 | 4 |
| 4 | (6) Zenon Plech | 3 | | F | | | 3 | | | | | | | F | | | - | | 3 |
| 4 | (7) Roman Jankowski | 6 | | | | 3 | | | F | | | 0 | | | | 3 | | | 6 |
| 4 | (8) Jerzy Rembas | 1 | | | E | | | | | T | 1 | | | | 0 | | | | 1 |
| 4 | (18) Marek Kepa | 0 | | | | | | | | | | | | | | | 0 | | 0 |
| Placing | Team / Rider name | Total | 1 | 2 | 3 | 4 | 5 | 6 | 7 | 8 | 9 | 10 | 11 | 12 | 13 | 14 | 15 | 16 | Pts | 17 | 18 | 19 | 20 |

M - exclusion for exceeding two-minute time allowance • T - exclusion for touching the tapes • X - other exclusion • E - retired or mechanical failure • F - fell

Helmet colours were permanent for each team (Red, Blue, White and Yellow/Black). Colours in diagrams indicate gate positions:
| gate A – inside | gate B | gate C | gate D – outside |

* West Germany & Soviet Union to World Final

=== Intercontinental Final ===
- 28 July
- (England) Norfolk Arena, King's Lynn
- Referee: (Australia) Sam Bass

| Placing | Team / Rider name | Total | 1 | 2 | 3 | 4 | 5 | 6 | 7 | 8 | 9 | 10 | 11 | 12 | 13 | 14 | 15 | 16 | Pts | 17 | 18 | 19 | 20 |
| 1 | Denmark | 31 | 0 | 2 | 2 | 2 | 5 | 7 | 10 | 13 | 15 | 18 | 21 | 24 | 26 | 27 | 28 | 31 | | 31 | 31 | 31 | 31 |
| 1 | (1) Ole Olsen | 9 | | | | 0 | | | | 3 | | | | 3 | | | | 3 | 9 |
| 1 | (2) Tommy Knudsen | 7 | | | 0 | | | | 3 | | | | 3 | | | | 1 | | 7 |
| 1 | (3) Erik Gundersen | 9 | | 2 | | | | 2 | | | | 3 | | | 2 | | | | 9 |
| 1 | (4) Hans Nielsen | 6 | 0 | | | | 3 | | | | 2 | | | | | 1 | | | 6 |
| 1 | (17) Preben Eriksen | 0 | | | | | | | | | | | | | | | | | 0 |
| 2 | England | 30 | 2 | 2 | 5 | 8 | 10 | 11 | 13 | 14 | 17 | 19 | 19 | 20 | 23 | 26 | 28 | 30 | | 30 | 30 | 30 | 30 |
| 2 | (9) Michael Lee | 9 | | | 3 | | 2 | | | | | 2 | | | | | | 2 | 9 |
| 2 | (10) Chris Morton | 9 | | | | 3 | | 1 | | | 3 | | | | | | 2 | | 9 |
| 2 | (11) Steve Bastable | 4 | | E | | | | | | 1 | | | - | | | 3 | | | 4 |
| 2 | (12) Dave Jessup | 8 | 2 | | | | | | 2 | | | | | 1 | 3 | | | | 8 |
| 2 | (19) Kenny Carter | 0 | | | | | | | | | | | 0 | | | | | | 0 |
| 3 | United States | 26 | 3 | 6 | 8 | 10 | 10 | 13 | 14 | 16 | 17 | 18 | 20 | 22 | 23 | 25 | 25 | 26 | | 26 | 26 | 26 | 26 |
| 3 | (5) Bruce Penhall | 9 | 3 | | | | | 3 | | | | | 2 | | | | | 1 | 9 |
| 3 | (6) Kelly Moran | 5 | | 3 | | | 0 | | | | | | | 2 | | | 0 | | 5 |
| 3 | (7) Bobby Schwartz | 6 | | | | 2 | | | 1 | | | 1 | | | | 2 | | | 6 |
| 3 | (8) Dennis Sigalos | 6 | | | 2 | | | | | 2 | 1 | | | | 1 | | | | 6 |
| 3 | (18) Scott Autrey | 0 | | | | | | | | | | | | | | | | | 0 |
| 4 | Sweden | 9 | 1 | 2 | 3 | 4 | 5 | 5 | 5 | 5 | 5 | 5 | 6 | 6 | 6 | 6 | 9 | 9 | | 9 | 9 | 9 | 9 |
| 4 | (13) Anders Michanek | 1 | | 1 | | | | | 0 | | - | | | | | | | - | 1 |
| 4 | (14) Jan Andersson | 4 | 1 | | | | | | | 0 | | 0 | | | | | 3 | | 4 |
| 4 | (15) Richard Hellsen | 1 | | | 1 | | | 0 | | | | | | 0 | | 0 | | | 1 |
| 4 | (16) Tommy Nilsson | 3 | | | | 1 | 1 | | | | | | 1 | | 0 | | | | 3 |
| 4 | (20) Hans Danielsson | 0 | | | | | | | | | 0 | | | | | | | 0 | 0 |
| Placing | Team / Rider name | Total | 1 | 2 | 3 | 4 | 5 | 6 | 7 | 8 | 9 | 10 | 11 | 12 | 13 | 14 | 15 | 16 | Pts | 17 | 18 | 19 | 20 |

M - exclusion for exceeding two-minute time allowance • T - exclusion for touching the tapes • X - other exclusion • E - retired or mechanical failure • F - fell

Helmet colours were permanent for each team (Red, Blue, White and Yellow/Black). Colours in diagrams indicate gate positions:
| gate A – inside | gate B | gate C | gate D – outside |

* Denmark & England to World Final

== World Final ==
- 16 August
- (West Germany) Olching Speedwaybahn, Olching
- Referee: (Sweden) C. Bergstrom

| Placing | Team / Rider name | Total | 1 | 2 | 3 | 4 | 5 | 6 | 7 | 8 | 9 | 10 | 11 | 12 | 13 | 14 | 15 | 16 | Pts | 17 | 18 | 19 | 20 |
| 1 | Denmark | 36 | 3 | 5 | 8 | 10 | 13 | 16 | 17 | 20 | 23 | 26 | 28 | 29 | 31 | 33 | 35 | 36 | | 36 | 36 | 36 | 36 |
| 1 | (13) Ole Olsen | 6 | | 2 | | | | | 1 | | 3 | | | | | | | - | 6 |
| 1 | (14) Hans Nielsen | 11 | 3 | | | | | | | 3 | | 3 | | | | | 2 | | 11 |
| 1 | (15) Erik Gundersen | 9 | | | 3 | | | 3 | | | | | | 1 | | 2 | | | 9 |
| 1 | (16) Tommy Knudsen | 9 | | | | 2 | 3 | | | | | | 2 | | 2 | | | | 9 |
| 1 | (20) Finn Thomsen | 1 | | | | | | | | | | | | | | | | 1 | 1 |
| 2 | England | 29 | 0 | 3 | 4 | 7 | 9 | 10 | 12 | 14 | 16 | 17 | 18 | 21 | 21 | 24 | 27 | 29 | | 29 | 29 | 29 | 29 |
| 2 | (5) Dave Jessup | 3 | E | | | | | 1 | | | | | - | | | | | 2 | 3 |
| 2 | (6) Chris Morton | 11 | | 3 | | | 2 | | | | | | | 3 | | | 3 | | 11 |
| 2 | (7) Kenny Carter | 9 | | | | 3 | | | 2 | | | 1 | | | | 3 | | | 9 |
| 2 | (8) John Davis | 5 | | | 1 | | | | | 2 | 2 | | | | E | | | | 5 |
| 2 | (18) Gordon Kennett | 1 | | | | | | | | | | | 1 | | | | | | 1 |
| 3 | West Germany | 28 | 2 | 2 | 4 | 5 | 6 | 8 | 11 | 12 | 13 | 15 | 18 | 20 | 23 | 24 | 25 | 28 | | 28 | 28 | 28 | 28 |
| 3 | (9) Karl Maier | 8 | | | 2 | | 1 | | | | | 2 | | | | | | 3 | 8 |
| 3 | (10) Georg Hack | 5 | | | | 1 | | 2 | | | 1 | | | | | | 1 | | 5 |
| 3 | (11) Georg Gilgenreiner | 5 | | 0 | | | | | | 1 | | | 3 | | | 1 | | | 5 |
| 3 | (12) Egon Müller | 10 | 2 | | | | | | 3 | | | | | 2 | 3 | | | | 10 |
| 3 | (19) Alois Wiesböck | 0 | | | | | | | | | | | | | | | | | 0 |
| 4 | Soviet Union | 3 | 1 | 2 | 2 | 2 | 2 | 2 | 2 | 2 | 2 | 2 | 2 | 2 | 3 | 3 | 3 | 3 | | 3 | 3 | 3 | 3 |
| 4 | (1) Valery Gordeev | 0 | | | | 0 | | | | 0 | | | | 0 | | | | 0 | 0 |
| 4 | (2) Mikhail Starostin | 0 | | | 0 | | | | 0 | | | | F | | | | - | | 0 |
| 4 | (3) Viktor Kuznetsov | 2 | | 1 | | | | 0 | | | | 0 | | | 1 | | | | 2 |
| 4 | (4) Nikolay Kornev | 1 | 1 | | | | - | | | | - | | | | | | E | | 1 |
| 4 | (17) Anatoly Maksimov | 0 | | | | | 0 | | | | 0 | | | | | | 0 | | 0 |
| Placing | Team / Rider name | Total | 1 | 2 | 3 | 4 | 5 | 6 | 7 | 8 | 9 | 10 | 11 | 12 | 13 | 14 | 15 | 16 | Pts | 17 | 18 | 19 | 20 |

M - exclusion for exceeding two-minute time allowance • T - exclusion for touching the tapes • X - other exclusion • E - retired or mechanical failure • F - fell

Helmet colours were permanent for each team (Red, Blue, White and Yellow/Black). Colours in diagrams indicate gate positions:
| gate A – inside | gate B | gate C | gate D – outside |

== See also ==
- 1981 Individual Speedway World Championship
- 1981 Speedway World Pairs Championship
