= 1984 Speedway World Pairs Championship =

15th edition of the World motorcycle speedway Pairs Championship

1984 World Pairs Championship

Seasons
- ← 1983 1985 →

The 1984 Speedway World Pairs Championship was the fifteenth FIM Speedway World Pairs Championship. The final took place in Lonigo, Italy. The championship was won by England (27 points). Silver medal was won by Denmark who beat New Zealand after Run-Off (both 25 points).

== Preliminary round ==
- (West Germany) Anton Treffer Stadion, Neustadt an der Donau
- 13 May

Placing	Pair / Rider Name	Total	1	2	3	4	5	6	7	8	9	10	11	12	13	14	15	16	17	18	19	20	21	22
1	Hungary	27 +3							10							18							27
1	(13) Sándor Tihanyi	15				3			2			2				2			3		3
1	(14) József Petrikovics	12				2			3			3				1			1		2			3
2	West Germany	27 +2							10							17							27
2	(7) Peter Wuertele	17		3				3			3					3				3			2	2
2	(8) Stefan Deser	10		2				2			1					0				2			3
3	Norway	17 +3							7							14							17
3	(3) Dag Haaland	10	3				3				0			2				2			0			3
3	(4) Einar Kyllingstad	7	0				1				2			3				0			1
4	Bulgaria	17 +2							4							11							17
4	(1) Rudolf Valentinov	11	2			1				3			2				2			1
4	(2) Veselin Markov	6	1			0				1			1				3			0				2
5	(Netherlands) Nederlands	16							3							9							16
5	(5) Frits Koppe	10		1			2			0					3				2			2
5	(6) Henk Steman	6		0			E			2					1				0			3
6	Austria	15							5							10							15
6	(11) Siegfried Eder	13			3				1				3		2			3					1
6	(12) Adi Funk	2			1				0				0		F			1					0
7	(Socialist Federal Republic of Yugoslavia) Yugoslavia	6							3							4							6
7	(9) Joze Zibert	0			0			0				-		0			0					0
7	(10) Kreso Omerzel	6			2			1				F		1			1					1
Placing	Pair / Rider Name	Total	1	2	3	4	5	6	7	8	9	10	11	12	13	14	15	16	17	18	19	20	21	22

m - exclusion for exceeding two minute time allowance • t - exclusion for touching the tapes • x - other exclusion • e - retired or mechanical failure • f - fell
ns - non-starter • nc - non-classify

gate A - inside	gate B	gate C	gate D - outside

== Semifinal 1 ==
- (Denmark) Fjelsted Speedway Stadium, Harndrup
- 3 June

Pos.	Team	Rider	Points
1st	Denmark (25 pts)	Hans Nielsen	13
1st	Denmark (25 pts)	Erik Gundersen	12
2nd	United States (24 pts)	Dennis Sigalos	14
2nd	United States (24 pts)	Shawn Moran	10
3rd	New Zealand (23 pts)	Mitch Shirra	14
3rd	New Zealand (23 pts)	Ivan Mauger	9
4	Sweden (20 pts)	Jan Andersson	15
4	Sweden (20 pts)	Björn Andersson	5
5	Finland (17 pts)	Kai Niemi	11
5	Finland (17 pts)	Ari Koponen	6
6	Hungary (11 pts)	József Petrikovics	9
6	Hungary (11 pts)	Sándor Tihanyi	2
7	Bulgaria (6 pts)	Nikolaj Manev	3
7	Bulgaria (6 pts)	Veselin Markov	3

== Semifinal 2 ==
- (Czechoslovakia) Svítkov Stadium, Pardubice
- 3 June

Pos.	Team	Rider	Points
1st	England (30 pts)	Peter Collins	16
1st	England (30 pts)	Chris Morton	14
2nd	Australia (22 pts)	Gary Guglielmi	14
2nd	Australia (22 pts)	Billy Sanders	8
3rd	Czechoslovakia (19+3 pts)	Jiří Štancl	13+3
3rd	Czechoslovakia (19+3 pts)	Antonin Kasper, Jr.	6
4	Poland (19+2 pts)	Zenon Plech	10+2
4	Poland (19+2 pts)	Andrzej Huszcza	9
5	West Germany (17 pts)	Klaus Lausch	11
5	West Germany (17 pts)	Stefan Deser	6
6	Netherlands (13 pts)	Henny Kroeze	8
6	Netherlands (13 pts)	Frits Koppe	5
7	Norway (5 pts)	Tormod Langli	5
7	Norway (5 pts)	Einar Kyllingstad	0

== World final ==
- (Italy) Santa Marina Stadium, Lonigo
- 17 June

Placing	Pair / Rider Name	Total	1	2	3	4	5	6	7	8	9	10	11	12	13	14	15	16	17	18	19	20	21
1	England	27							9							17							27
1	(9) Chris Morton	14			3			3				2		2			2					2
1	(10) Peter Collins	13			2			1				3		1			3					3
2	Denmark	25							7							17							25
2	(3) Hans Nielsen	15+3	3				2				2			3				3			2
2	(4) Erik Gundersen	10	2				0				3			2				E			3
3	New Zealand	25							9							17							25
3	(13) Ivan Mauger	9+2				2			1			3				E			1		2
3	(14) Mitch Shirra	16				3			3			2				3			2		3
4	United States	19							7							17							19
4	(1) Bobby Schwartz	11	2			2				2			3				1			1
4	(2) Shawn Moran	8	3			X				3			2				0			0
5	Australia	14							6							8							14
5	(7) Billy Sanders	6		1				3			0					0				2			0
5	(8) Gary Guglielmi	8		0				2			1					1				3			1
6	Czechoslovakia	10							2							4							10
6	(11) Aleš Dryml Sr.	5			1				0				0		1			2					1
6	(12) Jiří Štancl	5			0				1				1		0			3					0
7	Italy	6							2							4							6
7	(5) Armando Castagna	5		1			1			1					1				1			0
7	(6) Armando Dal Chiele	1		0			0			0					0				0			1
Placing	Pair / Rider Name	Total	1	2	3	4	5	6	7	8	9	10	11	12	13	14	15	16	17	18	19	20	21

m - exclusion for exceeding two minute time allowance • t - exclusion for touching the tapes • x - other exclusion • e - retired or mechanical failure • f - fell
ns - non-starter • nc - non-classify

gate A - inside	gate B	gate C	gate D - outside

== See also ==
- 1984 Individual Speedway World Championship
- 1984 Speedway World Team Cup
- motorcycle speedway
- 1984 in sports
