= 1983 Speedway World Pairs Championship =

14th edition of the World motorcycle speedway Pairs Championship

1983 World Pairs Championship

Seasons
- ← 1982 1984 →

The 1983 Speedway World Pairs Championship was the fourteenth FIM Speedway World Pairs Championship. The final took place on 18 June at the Ullevi Stadium in Gothenburg, Sweden.

England won their sixth World Pairs Championship after Kenny Carter and Peter Collins scored 25 points. Australia, represented by Billy Sanders and Gary Guglielmi finished second on 24 points, while the two men who would go on to dominate Motorcycle Speedway for the next six years, Hans Nielsen and Erik Gundersen, rode Denmark to third place with 19 points.

Heading into Heat 16 of the Final, Billy Sanders was the only unbeaten rider. He won the start from Guglielmi and out of form West German pair Egon Müller and Karl Maier when he unbelievably fell in turn 2 of the first lap. Although Guglielmi went on to win the re-run of the heat, the points lost as a result of Sanders exclusion ultimately cost Australia its first (and only) World Pairs Championship. While Australian referee Sam Bass had no hesitation in excluding Sanders, he had earlier allowed Peter Collins to re-start after video replays suggested that he fell with no help in the first turn of Heat 10 against Denmark. England went on to a 5–0 score in the heat after Nielsen was excluded from the re-start for falling off his bike over the tapes and Gundersen suffered engine failure a lap from the flag while leading the race.

Defending champions Dennis Sigalos and Bobby Schwartz (USA), finished fourth with 18 points. The USA had also won the World Pairs in 1981 with Bruce Penhall and Schwartz.

== Preliminary round ==
- (Socialist Federal Republic of Yugoslavia) Ilirija Sports Park, Ljubljana

Pos.	Team	Rider	Points
1st	Hungary - 27	Zoltan Hajdu	14
1st	Hungary - 27	Zoltan Adorjan	13
2nd	Netherlands - 21	Henny Kroeze	13
2nd	Netherlands - 21	Frits Koppe	8
3rd	Bulgaria - 20	Nikolaj Manev	15
3rd	Bulgaria - 20	Veselin Markov	5
4	Italy - 18	Armando Dal Chiele	9
4	Italy - 18	Valentino Furlanetto	9
5	Yugoslavia - 17	Kreso Omerzel	14
5	Yugoslavia - 17	Joze Zibert	3
6	Austria - 15	Adi Funk	10
6	Austria - 15	Robert Funk	5
7	Yugoslavia B - 8	Zvonko Pavlic	5
7	Yugoslavia B - 8	Artur Horvat	3

== Semifinal 1 ==
- (Poland) Olympic Stadium, Wrocław
- 5 June

Placing	Pair / Rider Name	Total	1	2	3	4	5	6	7	8	9	10	11	12	13	14	15	16	17	18	19	20	21
1	New Zealand	27							10							19							27
1	(7) Ivan Mauger	14		2				2			3					2				2			3
1	(8) Larry Ross	13		3				3			1					3				1			2
2	Australia	25							6							16							25
2	(5) Billy Sanders	15		0			3			3					3				3			3
2	(6) Gary Guglielmi	10		1			2			2					2				2			1
3	Denmark	23							6							13							23
3	(3) Hans Nielsen	13	3				1				2			3				2			2
3	(4) Erik Gundersen	10	2				0				0			2				3			3
4	Czechoslovakia	19							10							16							19
4	(13) Jiri Stancl	11				3			3			3				1			0		1
4	(14) Aleš Dryml	8				2			2			2				0			2		0
5	Poland	14							2							7							14
5	(1) Roman Jankowski	11	1			1				1			3				3			2
5	(2) Zenon Plech	3	0			0				0			1				2			0
6	Netherlands	9							4							7							9
6	(11) Henny Kroeze	9			3				1				2		1			1					1
6	(12) Henk Steman	0			0				0				0		E			0					T
7	Bulgaria	8							4							6							8
7	(9) Veselin Markov	4			1			0				1		1			1					0
7	(10) Nikolaj Manev	4			2			1				0		0			0					1
Placing	Pair / Rider Name	Total	1	2	3	4	5	6	7	8	9	10	11	12	13	14	15	16	17	18	19	20	21

m - exclusion for exceeding two minute time allowance • t - exclusion for touching the tapes • x - other exclusion • e - retired or mechanical failure • f - fell
ns - non-starter • nc - non-classify

gate A - inside	gate B	gate C	gate D - outside

== Semifinal 2 ==
- (West Germany) Hansa Stadium, Bremen
- 5 June

Placing	Pair / Rider Name	Total	1	2	3	4	5	6	7	8	9	10	11	12	13	14	15	16	17	18	19	20	21	22
1	United States	28							8							18							28
1	(1) Bobby Schwartz	13	2			2				2			2				2			3
1	(2) Dennis Sigalos	15	1			3				3			3				3			2
2	England	25							8							16							25
2	(3) Peter Collins	10	0				2				3			2				2			1
2	(4) Kenny Carter	15	3				3				2			1				3			3
3	West Germany	21 +3							9							15							21
3	(9) Egon Müller	14			3			3				2		3			F					3		3
3	(10) Karl Maier	7			2			1				1		0			1					2
4	Finland	21 +E							6							14							21
4	(13) Kai Niemi	8				1			2			0				3			2		0
4	(14) Ari Koponen	13				0			3			3				2			3		2			E
5	Hungary	13							7							9							13
5	(7) Zoltan Adorjan	8		3				2			1					0				1			1
5	(8) Zoltan Hajdu	5		2				0			0					1				0			2
6	Norway	10							2							6							10
6	(11) Tormod Langli	9			0				1				1		3			1					3
6	(12) Dag Haaland	1			1				F				0		0			0					0
7	Italy	8							2							6							8
7	(5) Armando Dal Chiele	3		0			0			0					1				1			1
7	(6) Valentino Furlanetto	5		1			1			1					2				0			F
Placing	Pair / Rider Name	Total	1	2	3	4	5	6	7	8	9	10	11	12	13	14	15	16	17	18	19	20	21	22

m - exclusion for exceeding two minute time allowance • t - exclusion for touching the tapes • x - other exclusion • e - retired or mechanical failure • f - fell
ns - non-starter • nc - non-classify

gate A - inside	gate B	gate C	gate D - outside

== World final ==
- (Sweden) Ullevi, Gothenburg
- 18 June
- Referee: (Australia) Sam Bass

Placing	Pair / Rider Name	Total	1	2	3	4	5	6	7	8	9	10	11	12	13	14	15	16	17	18	19	20	21
1	England	25							10							18							25
1	(9) Kenny Carter	15			2			3				3		2			2					3
1	(10) Peter Collins	10			3			2				2		1			1					1
2	Australia	24							10							17							24
2	(3) Billy Sanders	15	3				3				3			3				E			3
2	(4) Gary Guglielmi	9	2				2				1			0				3			1
3	Denmark	19							10							14							19
3	(13) Hans Nielsen	11				2			3			T				1			3		2
3	(14) Erik Gundersen	8				3			2			E				3			0		0
4	United States	18							2							10							18
4	(1) Dennis Sigalos	10	0			X				3			1				3			3
4	(2) Bobby Schwartz	8	1			1				2			2				0			2
5	Sweden	16							6							10							16
5	(7) Jan Andersson	12		3				1			2					2				1			3
5	(8) Pierre Brannefors	4		2				0			0					0				0			2
6	West Germany	12							2							8							12
6	(11) Karl Maier	6			0				1				3		0			2					X
6	(12) Egon Müller	6			1				0				0		3			1					1
7	New Zealand	11							2							6							11
7	(5) Larry Ross	4		0			1			1					1				1			0
7	(6) Ivan Mauger	7		1			0			X					2				2			2
Placing	Pair / Rider Name	Total	1	2	3	4	5	6	7	8	9	10	11	12	13	14	15	16	17	18	19	20	21

m - exclusion for exceeding two minute time allowance • t - exclusion for touching the tapes • x - other exclusion • e - retired or mechanical failure • f - fell
ns - non-starter • nc - non-classify

gate A - inside	gate B	gate C	gate D - outside

== See also ==
- 1983 Individual Speedway World Championship
- 1983 Speedway World Team Cup
- motorcycle speedway
- 1983 in sports
