= 1985 Speedway World Pairs Championship =

16th edition of the World motorcycle speedway Pairs Championship

1985 World Pairs Championship

Seasons
- ← 1984 1986 →

The 1985 Speedway World Pairs Championship was the sixteenth FIM Speedway World Pairs Championship. The final took place in Rybnik, Poland. The championship was won by Denmark (29 points) who beat England (27 pts) and United States (22 pts).

The 1985 World Pairs Final was the last World Championship final appearance of legendary New Zealand rider Ivan Mauger. In a career lasting almost 30 years, Mauger had won 15 World Championships, including a record 6 Individual World Championships, 4 World Team Cups, 3 Long Track World Championships and 2 World Pairs Championships.

== Preliminary round ==
- (Netherlands) Stichting Baansport Blijham, Blijham
- 21 April

Pos.	Team	Rider	Points
1st	Italy (26 pts)	Armando Castagna	17
1st	Italy (26 pts)	Valentino Furlanetto	9
2nd	Netherlands (24 pts)	Henny Kroeze	17
2nd	Netherlands (24 pts)	Frits Koppe	7
3rd	Hungary (19+3 pts)	Zoltán Adorján	13+3
3rd	Hungary (19+3 pts)	Zoltan Hajdu	6
4	Norway (19+2 pts)	Roy Otto	10+2
4	Norway (19+2 pts)	Einar Kyllingstad	9
5	Austria (17 pts)	Heinrich Schatzer	13
5	Austria (17 pts)	Toni Pilotto	4
6	Bulgaria (11 pts)	Orlin Janakiev	8
6	Bulgaria (11 pts)	Stanislav Tzankov	3
7	Yugoslavia (10 pts)	Artur Kocmut	6
7	Yugoslavia (10 pts)	Krešo Omerzel	4

== Semifinal 1 ==
- (West Germany) Motodrom Halbemond, Norden
- 26 May

Pos.	Team	Rider	Points
1st	Denmark (28 pts)	Erik Gundersen	16
1st	Denmark (28 pts)	Tommy Knudsen	12
2nd	Australia (24 pts)	Phil Crump	13
2nd	Australia (24 pts)	Steve Regeling	11
3rd	New Zealand (24 pts)	Mitch Shirra	14
3rd	New Zealand (24 pts)	Ivan Mauger	10
4	West Germany (19 pts)	Karl Maier	14
4	West Germany (19 pts)	Klaus Lausch	5
5	Austria (12 pts)	Heinrich Schatzer	8
5	Austria (12 pts)	Toni Pilotto	4
6	Netherlands (11 pts)	Henny Kroeze	7
6	Netherlands (11 pts)	Frits Koppe	4
7	Hungary (8 pts)	Zoltán Adorján	5
7	Hungary (8 pts)	Zoltan Hajdu	3

== Semifinal 2 ==
- (England) Odsal Stadium, Bradford
- 1 June

Pos.	Team	Rider	Points
1st	United States (27 pts)	Shawn Moran	15
1st	United States (27 pts)	Bobby Schwartz	12
2nd	England (24 pts)	Kenny Carter	13
2nd	England (24 pts)	Kelvin Tatum	11
3rd	Sweden (21 pts)	Jan Andersson	14
3rd	Sweden (21 pts)	Per Jonsson	7
4	Italy (17 pts)	Armando Castagna	9
4	Italy (17 pts)	Valentino Furlanetto	8
5	Finland (15 pts)	Kai Niemi	12
5	Finland (15 pts)	Ari Koponen	3
6	Czechoslovakia (14 pts)	Antonin Kasper, Jr.	9
6	Czechoslovakia (14 pts)	Aleš Dryml Sr.	5
7	Norway (8 pts)	Einar Kyllingstad	7
7	Norway (8 pts)	Roy Otto	1

== World final ==
- (Poland) Rybnik Municipal Stadium, Rybnik
- 15 June

Placing	Pair / Rider Name	Total	1	2	3	4	5	6	7	8	9	10	11	12	13	14	15	16	17	18	19	20	21
1	Denmark	29							10							19							29
1	(13) Erik Gundersen	16				3			3			3				2			2		3
1	(14) Tommy Knudsen	13				2			2			1				3			3		2
2	England	27							10							17							27
2	(9) Kenny Carter	14			3			2				2		2			2					3
2	(10) Kelvin Tatum	13			2			3				0		3			3					2
3	United States	22							6							16							22
3	(1) Bobby Schwartz	11	2			0				2			3				1			3
3	(2) Shawn Moran	11	3			1				3			2				0			2
4	New Zealand	15							4							10							15
4	(7) Ivan Mauger	8		0				1			3					E				1			3
4	(8) Mitch Shirra	7		3				0			2					1				0			1
5	Sweden	14							2							7							14
5	(11) Jan Andersson	10			0				1				1		3			3					2
5	(12) Per Jonsson	4			1				0				0		1			2					0
6	Australia	11							6							9							11
6	(5) Steve Regeling	6		2			1			1					0				1			1
6	(6) Phil Crump	5		1			2			0					2				0			0
7	Poland	8							4							6							8
7	(3) Andrzej Huszcza	4	0				3				1			0				0			F
7	(4) Grzegorz Dzikowski	4	1				0				0			1				1			1
Placing	Pair / Rider Name	Total	1	2	3	4	5	6	7	8	9	10	11	12	13	14	15	16	17	18	19	20	21

m - exclusion for exceeding two minute time allowance • t - exclusion for touching the tapes • x - other exclusion • e - retired or mechanical failure • f - fell
ns - non-starter • nc - non-classify

gate A - inside	gate B	gate C	gate D - outside

== See also ==
- 1985 Individual Speedway World Championship
- 1985 Speedway World Team Cup
- motorcycle speedway
- 1985 in sports
