= 1982 Speedway World Pairs Championship =

13th edition of the World motorcycle speedway Pairs Championship

1982 World Pairs Championship

Seasons
- ← 1981 1983 →

The 1982 Speedway World Pairs Championship was the thirteenth FIM Speedway World Pairs Championship. The final took place in Sydney, Australia, at the Liverpool City Raceway.

The championship was won by Dennis Sigalos and Bobby Schwartz of the United States, who were undefeated on the night. Peter Collins and Kenny Carter of England finished second, with Hans Nielsen and Ole Olsen of Denmark third. As the host nation, Australia was seeded directly to the Final and were represented by Australian Champion Billy Sanders and Australian championship runner up Gary Guglielmi, both Sydney based riders who were riding on their home track. Australia finished in a disappointing fourth place.

Despite motorcycle speedway having its origins in Australia as far back as the 1910s, the 1982 World Pairs Final was the first time Australia had held a Speedway World Final. 1982 was also the only time the World Pairs Championship was held outside of England or Europe.

== Preliminary round ==
- (Socialist Federal Republic of Yugoslavia) Matija Gubec Stadium, Krško
- 2 May

Pos.	Team	Rider	Points
1st	Hungary - 24	Zoltan Adorjan	13
1st	Hungary - 24	Zoltan Hajdu	11
2nd	Italy - 21	Armando Dal Chiele	12
2nd	Italy - 21	Francesko Biginato	9
3rd	Bulgaria - 20	Nikolaj Manev	10
3rd	Bulgaria - 20	Veselin Markov	10
4	Netherlands - 20	Henny Kroeze	7
4	Netherlands - 20	Rudy Muts	13
5	Yugoslavia - 18	Stefan Kekec	9
5	Yugoslavia - 18	Vlado Kocuvan	9
6	Austria - 17	Adi Funk	10
6	Austria - 17	Herbert Scherecz	7
7	Switzerland - 6	Romano Reutimann	5
7	Switzerland - 6	Paul Kaspar	1

== Semifinal 1 ==
- (Denmark) Vojens Speedway Center, Vojens
- 5 June

Placing	Pair / Rider Name	Total	1	2	3	4	5	6	7	8	9	10	11	12	13	14	15	16	17	18	19	20	21
1	Denmark	28							10							20							28
1	(7) Ole Olsen	16		3				3			3					2				3			2
1	(8) Erik Gundersen	12		2				2			2					3				2			1
2	New Zealand	24							10							18							24
2	(1) Ivan Mauger	16	3			3				3			3				3			1
2	(2) Larry Ross	8	2			2				1			1				2			0
3	Finland	23							10							15							23
3	(11) Kai Niemi	15			2				2				2		3			3					3
3	(12) Ari Koponen	8			3				3				0		0			2					0
4	Sweden	21							6							11							21
4	(5) Jan Andersson	13		1			3			2					2				3			2
4	(6) Tommy Nilsson	8		0			2			0					1				2			3
5	West Germany	11							2							9							11
5	(9) Egon Müller	9			1			1				3		3			1					0
5	(10) Georg Gilgenreiner	2			0			0				1		E			0					1
6	Italy	11							2							6							11
6	(3) Francesco Biginato	6	1				1				1			1				1			1
6	(4) Armando Dal Chiele	5	0				0				0			2				F			3
7	Bulgaria	8							2							5							8
7	(13) Nikolaj Manev	6				0			1			2				1			E		2
7	(14) Veselin Markov	2				1			0			0				0			1		0
Placing	Pair / Rider Name	Total	1	2	3	4	5	6	7	8	9	10	11	12	13	14	15	16	17	18	19	20	21

m - exclusion for exceeding two minute time allowance • t - exclusion for touching the tapes • x - other exclusion • e - retired or mechanical failure • f - fell
ns - non-starter • nc - non-classify

gate A - inside	gate B	gate C	gate D - outside

== Semifinal 2 ==
- (Czechoslovakia) Markéta Stadium, Prague
- 5 June

Placing	Pair / Rider Name	Total	1	2	3	4	5	6	7	8	9	10	11	12	13	14	15	16	17	18	19	20	21
1	England	29							9							19							29
1	(7) Peter Collins	14		2				1			3					3				3			2
1	(8) Kenny Carter	15		3				3			2					2				2			3
2	United States	26							10							20							26
2	(11) Bruce Penhall	11			2				3				2		2			2					0
2	(12) Dennis Sigalos	15			3				2				3		3			3					1
3	Czechoslovakia	22							6							12							22
3	(5) Aleš Dryml	14		1			3			3					1				3			3
3	(6) Petr Ondrasik	8		0			2			2					0				2			2
4	Hungary	14							3							10							14
4	(9) Zoltan Hajdu	4			1			0				1		1			0					1
4	(10) Zoltan Adorjan	10			0			2				2		3			3					0
5	Poland	12							4							8							12
5	(13) Edward Jancarz	11				3			1			3				1			0		3
5	(14) Zenon Plech	1				E			0			0				0			1		E
6	Norway	12							6							8							12
6	(1) Dag Haaland	6	2			1				F			1				2			0
6	(2) Roy Otto	6	1			2				1			0				1			1
7	Netherlands	11							4							7							11
7	(3) Henny Kroeze	9	3				1				X			2				1			2
7	(4) Rudy Muts	2	0				E				1			E				0			1
Placing	Pair / Rider Name	Total	1	2	3	4	5	6	7	8	9	10	11	12	13	14	15	16	17	18	19	20	21

m - exclusion for exceeding two minute time allowance • t - exclusion for touching the tapes • x - other exclusion • e - retired or mechanical failure • f - fell
ns - non-starter • nc - non-classify

gate A - inside	gate B	gate C	gate D - outside

== World final ==
- (Australia) Liverpool City Raceway, Sydney
- 11 December
- Referee: (Australia) Sam Bass

Placing	Pair / Rider Name	Total	1	2	3	4	5	6	7	8	9	10	11	12	13	14	15	16	17	18	19	20	21
1	United States	30							10							20							30
1	(11) Bobby Schwartz	12			2				2				2		2			2					2
1	(12) Dennis Sigalos	18			3				3				3		3			3					3
2	England	22							6							12							22
2	(5) Kenny Carter	7		0			1			2					0				2			2
2	(6) Peter Collins	15		2			3			3					1				3			3
3	Denmark	21							6							16							21
3	(13) Hans Nielsen	11				3			1			3				2			1		1
3	(14) Ole Olsen	10				2			0			2				3			0		3
4	Australia	16							4							13							16
4	(3) Billy Sanders	11	2				2				3			2				E			2
4	(4) Gary Guglielmi	5	0				0				1			3				1			X
5	Finland	16							9							12							16
5	(7) Kai Niemi	12		3				2			2					1				3			1
5	(8) Ari Koponen	4		1				3			0					E				0			0
6	New Zealand	13							5							7							13
6	(1) Larry Ross	5	1			1				1			0				X			2
6	(2) Mitch Shirra	8	3			0				0			1				3			1
7	Czechoslovakia	8							2							4							8
7	(9) Aleš Dryml	3			0			1				1		0			1					0
7	(10) Jiří Štancl	5			1			0				0		1			2					1
Placing	Pair / Rider Name	Total	1	2	3	4	5	6	7	8	9	10	11	12	13	14	15	16	17	18	19	20	21

m - exclusion for exceeding two minute time allowance • t - exclusion for touching the tapes • x - other exclusion • e - retired or mechanical failure • f - fell
ns - non-starter • nc - non-classify

gate A - inside	gate B	gate C	gate D - outside

== See also ==
- 1982 Individual Speedway World Championship
- 1982 Speedway World Team Cup
- motorcycle speedway
- 1982 in sports
