= 1979 Speedway World Pairs Championship =

10th edition of the World motorcycle speedway Pairs Championship

1979 World Pairs Championship

Seasons
- ← 1978 1980 →

The 1979 Speedway World Pairs Championship was the tenth FIM Speedway World Pairs Championship. The final took place in Vojens, Denmark. The championship was won by host Denmark (25 points) who beat England (24 points) and Poland (20 points).

== Preliminary round ==
- (Bulgaria) Targovishte Speedway Stadium, Targovishte
- May 13

Pos.	Team	Rider	Points
1st	Hungary - 23+3	?	?
1st	Hungary - 23+3	?	?
2nd	Austria - 23+2	?	?
2nd	Austria - 23+2	?	?
3rd	Finland - 22	?	?
3rd	Finland - 22	?	?
4	Netherlands - 21	?	?
4	Netherlands - 21	?	?
5	Italy - 19	?	?
5	Italy - 19	?	?
6	Bulgaria - 10	?	?
6	Bulgaria - 10	?	?
7	Yugoslavia - 8	?	?
7	Yugoslavia - 8	?	?

== Semifinal 1 ==
- (West Germany) Ellermühle Speedway Stadium, Landshut
- 9 June

Placing	Pair / Rider Name	Total	1	2	3	4	5	6	7	8	9	10	11	12	13	14	15	16	17	18	19	20	21
1	Australia	28							10							20							28
1	(11) Phil Crump	16			3				3				2		3			3					2
1	(12) John Titman	12			2				2				3		2			0					3
2	Finland	23							9							15							23
2	(5) Kai Niemi	15		3			3			3					1				2			3
2	(6) Ila Teromaa	8		2			1			2					0				1			2
3	England	20							5							12							20
3	(3) Michael Lee	13	3				2				3			E				2			3
3	(4) Gordon Kennett	7	0				0				1			3				1			2
4	Sweden	14							8							10							14
4	(1) Jan Andersson	7	1			2				0			1				3			0
4	(2) Bernt Persson	7	2			3				1			0				0			1
5	West Germany	14							4							8							14
5	(7) Georg Hack	11		0				3			2					2				3			1
5	(8) Waldemar Bacik	3		1				E			0					0				2			0
6	Netherlands	13							4							9							13
6	(9) Rudi Muts	8			0			2				3		X			2					1
6	(10) Frits Koppe	5			1			1				E		2			1					0
7	Norway	13							2							9							13
7	(13) Tormod Langli	10				1			1			2				3			3		0
7	(14) Reidar Eide	3				0			0			1				1			0		1
Placing	Pair / Rider Name	Total	1	2	3	4	5	6	7	8	9	10	11	12	13	14	15	16	17	18	19	20	21

m - exclusion for exceeding two minute time allowance • t - exclusion for touching the tapes • x - other exclusion • e - retired or mechanical failure • f - fell
ns - non-starter • nc - non-classify

gate A - inside	gate B	gate C	gate D - outside

== Semifinal 2 ==
- (Socialist Federal Republic of Yugoslavia) Ilirija Sports Park, Ljubljana
- 10 June

Placing	Pair / Rider Name	Total	1	2	3	4	5	6	7	8	9	10	11	12	13	14	15	16	17	18	19	20	21
1	Poland	26							9							16							26
1	(13) Edward Jancarz	16				3			3			2				3			2		3
1	(14) Zenon Plech	10				2			1			0				2			3		2
2	New Zealand	25							6							15							25
2	(11) Ivan Mauger	13			1				E				3		3			3					3
2	(12) Larry Ross	12			3				2				1		2			2					2
3	United States	22							5							14							22
3	(9) Kelly Moran	8			0			0				1		2			3					2
3	(10) Bruce Penhall	14			2			3				3		3			2					1
4	Czechoslovakia	18							7							13							18
4	(7) Jiri Stancl	11		3				2			2					0				3			1
4	(8) Jan Verner	7		1				1			3					1				1			0
5	Hungary	15							6							12							15
5	(1) Istvan Sziraczky	11	3			1				3			2				0			2
5	(2) Laszlo Meszaros	4	2			0				1			0				1			0
6	Austria	13							7							10							13
6	(5) Adi Funk	10		2			3			2					1				0			2
6	(6) Frits Koppe	3		E			2			0					0				1			0
7	Yugoslavia	6							2							4							6
7	(3) Franc Zagar	5	1				0				1			1				1			1
7	(4) Vlado Kocuvan	1	0				1				0			0				0			E
Placing	Pair / Rider Name	Total	1	2	3	4	5	6	7	8	9	10	11	12	13	14	15	16	17	18	19	20	21

m - exclusion for exceeding two minute time allowance • t - exclusion for touching the tapes • x - other exclusion • e - retired or mechanical failure • f - fell
ns - non-starter • nc - non-classify

gate A - inside	gate B	gate C	gate D - outside

== World final ==
- (Denmark) Speedway Center, Vojens
- 23 June

American Kelly Moran did not start, because he was injured at official practice. His replacement Steve Gresham and the reserve rider Ron Preston were stuck at Heathrow Airport in England, forcing Penhall to ride alone.

Placing	Pair / Rider Name	Total	1	2	3	4	5	6	7	8	9	10	11	12	13	14	15	16	17	18	19	20	21
1	Denmark	25							8							15							25
1	(11) Ole Olsen	15			2				3				2		3			2					3
1	(12) Hans Nielsen	10			1				2				0		2			3					2
2	England	24							10							19							24
2	(1) Malcolm Simmons	9	2			2				2			3				0			0
2	(2) Michael Lee	15	3			3				3			1				3			2
3	Poland	20							6							15							20
3	(7) Edward Jancarz	13		1				3			3					2				3			1
3	(8) Zenon Plech	7		2				0			1					3				1			0
4	Australia	19							6							13							19
4	(9) Phil Crump	13			3			2				1		3			2					2
4	(10) John Titman	6			W			1				2		1			1					1
5	United States	14							6							8							14
5	(5) Bruce Penhall	14		3			3			1					1				3			3
5	(6) *Kelly Moran	-0					-			-					-				-			-
6	New Zealand	12							2							5							12
6	(13) Ivan Mauger	6				0			1			E				X			2		3
6	(14) Larry Ross	6				1			0			3				E			E		2
7	Finland	7							1							5							7
7	(3) Ila Teromaa	0	0				F				-			-				-			-
7	(4) Kai Niemi	7	1				X				2			2				1			1
Placing	Pair / Rider Name	Total	1	2	3	4	5	6	7	8	9	10	11	12	13	14	15	16	17	18	19	20	21

m - exclusion for exceeding two minute time allowance • t - exclusion for touching the tapes • x - other exclusion • e - retired or mechanical failure • f - fell
ns - non-starter • nc - non-classify

gate A - inside	gate B	gate C	gate D - outside

== See also ==
- 1979 Individual Speedway World Championship
- 1979 Speedway World Team Cup
- motorcycle speedway
- 1979 in sports
