= 1986 Speedway World Pairs Championship =

17th edition of the World motorcycle speedway Pairs Championship

1986 World Pairs Championship

Seasons
- ← 1985 1987 →

The 1986 Speedway World Pairs Championship was the seventeenth FIM Speedway World Pairs Championship. The final took place at the Rottalstadion in Pocking, West Germany. The championship was won by Denmark who beat United States after Run-Off (both 46 points). Bronze medal was won by Czechoslovakia (32 points).

== Semifinal 1 ==
- (Italy) Santa Marina Stadium, Lonigo
- 11 May

Pos.	Team	Rider	Points
1st	England (49 pts)	Simon Wigg	27
1st	England (49 pts)	Kenny Carter	22
2nd	United States (41 pts)	Shawn Moran	25
2nd	United States (41 pts)	Bobby Schwartz	16
3rd	Australia (41 pts)	Phil Crump	22
3rd	Australia (41 pts)	Steve Regeling	19
4	Italy (37 pts)	Armando Castagna	21
4	Italy (37 pts)	Valentino Furlanetto	16
5	Hungary (29 pts)	Zoltán Adorján	17
5	Hungary (29 pts)	Sándor Tihanyi	12
6	Italy B (29 pts)	Paolo Salvatelli	21
6	Italy B (29 pts)	Francisco Biginato	8
7	Austria (15 pts)	Toni Pilotto	12
7	Austria (15 pts)	Heinrich Schatzer	3
8	Netherlands (14 pts)	Frits Koppe	12
8	Netherlands (14 pts)	Henny Kroeze	4
9	Norway (11 pts)	Ingvar Skogland	6
9	Norway (11 pts)	Arnt Forland	5

== Semifinal 2 ==
- (Czechoslovakia) Svítkov Stadium, Pardubice
- 18 May

Pos.	Team	Rider	Points
1st	Denmark (52 pts)	Hans Nielsen	27
1st	Denmark (52 pts)	Erik Gundersen	25
2nd	Sweden (45 pts)	Jan Andersson	24
2nd	Sweden (45 pts)	Tommy Nilsson	23
3rd	Czechoslovakia (39 pts)	Roman Matoušek	22
3rd	Czechoslovakia (39 pts)	Antonín Kasper Jr.	17
4	New Zealand (34.5 pts)	Mitch Shirra	17.5
4	New Zealand (34.5 pts)	Larry Ross	17
5	Poland (30.5 pts)	Roman Jankowski	16.5
5	Poland (30.5 pts)	Wojciech Żabiałowicz	14
6	Finland (30 pts)	Kai Niemi	19
6	Finland (30 pts)	Ari Koponen	11
7	Yugoslavia (20 pts)	Krešo Omerzel	12
7	Yugoslavia (20 pts)	Zvonko Pavlic	8
8	Bulgaria (14 pts)	Nikolaj Manev	7
8	Bulgaria (14 pts)	Angel Jeftimov	7
9	France (8 pts)	Patrice Blondy	6
9	France (8 pts)	Thierry Hilaire	2

== World final ==
- (West Germany) Rottalstadion, Pocking
- 11 June

Pos.	Team	Rider	Points
1st	Denmark (46+5 pts)	Hans Nielsen (5,4,5,4,4,5)	27+5
1st	Denmark (46+5 pts)	Erik Gundersen (e,5,e,5,5,4)	19
2nd	United States (46+4 pts)	Kelly Moran (3,5,3,5,4,3)	23+4
2nd	United States (46+4 pts)	Sam Ermolenko (4,4,4,4,5,2)	23
3rd	Czechoslovakia (32 pts)	Antonín Kasper Jr. (1,5,5,5,5,1)	22
3rd	Czechoslovakia (32 pts)	Roman Matoušek (2,1,4,x,3,0)	10
4	Sweden (32 pts)	Jan Andersson (4,3,5,1,2,2)	17
4	Sweden (32 pts)	Tommy Nilsson (5,1,1,2,3,3)	15
5	New Zealand (32 pts)	Larry Ross (3,3,3,3,4,4)	20
5	New Zealand (32 pts)	Mitch Shirra (4,2,2,4,x,x)	12
6	West Germany (27 pts)	Karl Maier (3,4,4,3,3,5)	22
6	West Germany (27 pts)	Klaus Lausch (2,0,0,1,1,1)	5
7	England (23 pts)	Jeremy Doncaster (5,2,2,1,0,2)	12
7	England (23 pts)	Simon Wigg (0,3,0,3,2,3)	11
8	Italy (15 pts)	Valentino Furlanetto (1,1,0,0,1,5)	8
8	Italy (15 pts)	Armando Castagna (0,0,1,2,0,4)	7
9	Australia (15 pts)	Phil Crump (2,2,3,0,2,1)	10
9	Australia (15 pts)	Steve Regeling (1,0,2,2,f,-)	5

== See also ==
- 1986 Individual Speedway World Championship
- 1986 Speedway World Team Cup
- motorcycle speedway
- 1986 in sports
