= 1981 Speedway World Pairs Championship =

12th edition of the World motorcycle speedway Pairs Championship

1981 World Pairs Championship

Seasons
- ← 1980 1982 →

The 1981 Speedway World Pairs Championship was the twelfth FIM Speedway World Pairs Championship. The final took place in Chorzów, Poland. The championship was won by United States first time (23 points). American pair beat New Zealand (22 points) and Poland (21 points).

The win by American's Bruce Penhall and Bobby Schwartz was the first time an American team or riders had won a World Championship in speedway since Jack Milne had won the 1937 World Final at the Wembley Stadium in London, England. Later in 1981 Penhall would go on to win the Individual World Final at Wembley.

== Preliminary round ==
- (Socialist Federal Republic of Yugoslavia) Mladost Stadum, Prelog
- 3 May

| Pos. | Team | Rider | Points |
|---|---|---|---|
| 1st | Norway – 21+3 | Rolf Gramstad | 17 |
| 1st | Norway – 21+3 | Ingvar Hauverstad | 4 |
| 2nd | Yugoslavia – 21+2 | Stefan Kekec | 15 |
| 2nd | Yugoslavia – 21+2 | Vlado Kocuvan | 6 |
| 3rd | Austria – 20 | Adi Funk | 9 |
| 3rd | Austria – 20 | Herbert Szerecz | 11 |
| 4 | Netherlands – 19 | Henny Kroeze | 6 |
| 4 | Netherlands – 19 | Frits Koppe | 13 |
| 5 | Hungary – 18 | Zoltán Adorján | 16 |
| 5 | Hungary – 18 | Isztvan Sziracky | 2 |
| 6 | Bulgaria – 13 | Angel Jeftimov | 8 |
| 6 | Bulgaria – 13 | Nikolaj Manev | 5 |
| 7 | Switzerland – 11 | M.Gerard | 8 |
| 7 | Switzerland – 11 | F.Ender | 3 |

== Semifinal 1 ==
- (West Germany) Motodrom Halbemond, Norden
- 7 June

| Placing | Pair / Rider Name | Total | 1 | 2 | 3 | 4 | 5 | 6 | 7 | 8 | 9 | 10 | 11 | 12 | 13 | 14 | 15 | 16 | 17 | 18 | 19 | 20 | 21 | 22 |
| 1 | West Germany | 23 +3 | | | | | | | 6 | | | | | | | 13 | | | | | | | 23 |
| 1 | (7) Egon Müller | 13 | | 0 | | | | 3 | | | 3 | | | | | 2 | | | | 2 | | | 3 | 3 |
| 1 | (8) Georg Gilgenreiner | 10 | | 2 | | | | 1 | | | 2 | | | | | 0 | | | | 3 | | | 2 |
| 2 | England | 23 +2 | | | | | | | 9 | | | | | | | 18 | | | | | | | 23 |
| 2 | (13) Chris Morton | 12 | | | | 2 | | | 3 | | | 2 | | | | 3 | | | 0 | | 2 |
| 2 | (14) Dave Jessup | 11 | | | | 3 | | | 1 | | | 3 | | | | 1 | | | 3 | | 0 | | | 2 |
| 3 | New Zealand | 23 +1 | | | | | | | 10 | | | | | | | 14 | | | | | | | 23 |
| 3 | (3) Ivan Mauger | 15 | 3 | | | | 3 | | | | 1 | | | 2 | | | | 3 | | | 3 | | | 1 |
| 3 | (4) Larry Ross | 8 | 2 | | | | 2 | | | | 0 | | | 1 | | | | 2 | | | 1 |
| 4 | Sweden | 20 | | | | | | | 5 | | | | | | | 14 | | | | | | | 20 |
| 4 | (5) Jan Andersson | 10 | | 3 | | | 0 | | | 3 | | | | | 2 | | | | 2 | | | 0 |
| 4 | (6) Richard Hellsén | 10 | | 1 | | | 1 | | | 1 | | | | | 3 | | | | 1 | | | 3 |
| 5 | Finland | 17 | | | | | | | 5 | | | | | | | 9 | | | | | | | 17 |
| 5 | (9) Kai Niemi | 10 | | | 3 | | | 2 | | | | 1 | | E | | | 3 | | | | | 1 |
| 5 | (10) Ari Koponen | 7 | | | E | | | 0 | | | | 0 | | 3 | | | 2 | | | | | 2 |
| 6 | Norway | 11 | | | | | | | 5 | | | | | | | 9 | | | | | | | 11 |
| 6 | (11) Rolf Gramstad | 8 | | | 2 | | | | 2 | | | | 2 | | E | | | 1 | | | | | 1 |
| 6 | (12) Audun Ove Olsen | 3 | | | 1 | | | | 0 | | | | 1 | | 1 | | | 0 | | | | | 0 |
| 7 | (Netherlands) Nederlands | 9 | | | | | | | 2 | | | | | | | 7 | | | | | | | 9 |
| 7 | (1) Henny Kroeze | 7 | 1 | | | E | | | | 2 | | | 3 | | | | E | | | 1 |
| 7 | (2) Frits Koppe | 2 | E | | | 1 | | | | 0 | | | 0 | | | | 1 | | | E |
| Placing | Pair / Rider Name | Total | 1 | 2 | 3 | 4 | 5 | 6 | 7 | 8 | 9 | 10 | 11 | 12 | 13 | 14 | 15 | 16 | 17 | 18 | 19 | 20 | 21 | 22 |

m - exclusion for exceeding two minute time allowance • t - exclusion for touching the tapes • x - other exclusion • e - retired or mechanical failure • f - fell
ns - non-starter • nc - non-classify

| gate A - inside | gate B | gate C | gate D - outside |

== Semifinal 2 ==
- (Italy) Giavera del Montello Municipal Stadium, Treviso
- 7 June

| Placing | Pair / Rider Name | Total | 1 | 2 | 3 | 4 | 5 | 6 | 7 | 8 | 9 | 10 | 11 | 12 | 13 | 14 | 15 | 16 | 17 | 18 | 19 | 20 | 21 | 22 |
| 1 | Denmark | 29 | | | | | | | 10 | | | | | | | 20 | | | | | | | 29 |
| 1 | (9) Ole Olsen | 17 | | | 3 | | | 3 | | | | 2 | | 3 | | | 3 | | | | | 3 |
| 1 | (10) Hans Nielsen | 12 | | | 2 | | | 2 | | | | 3 | | 2 | | | 2 | | | | | 1 |
| 2 | (United States) USA | 22 +3 | | | | | | | 8 | | | | | | | 14 | | | | | | | 22 |
| 2 | (3) Bruce Penhall | 13 | 3 | | | | 1 | | | | 3 | | | 1 | | | | 2 | | | 3 | | | 3 |
| 2 | (4) Bobby Schwartz | 9 | 2 | | | | 2 | | | | 2 | | | 0 | | | | 1 | | | 2 |
| 3 | Czechoslovakia | 22 +2 | | | | | | | 8 | | | | | | | 15 | | | | | | | 22 |
| 3 | (5) Aleš Dryml Sr. | 15 | | 3 | | | 3 | | | 3 | | | | | 2 | | | | 2 | | | 2 | | 2 |
| 3 | (6) Jan Verner | 7 | | 2 | | | 0 | | | 1 | | | | | 1 | | | | 3 | | | 0 |
| 4 | Australia | 22 +1 | | | | | | | 6 | | | | | | | 14 | | | | | | | 22 |
| 4 | (11) Billy Sanders | 11 | | | 0 | | | | 3 | | | | 3 | | 0 | | | 3 | | | | | 2 | 1 |
| 4 | (12) John Titman | 11 | | | 1 | | | | 2 | | | | 2 | | 3 | | | 0 | | | | | 3 |
| 5 | Italy | 14 | | | | | | | 2 | | | | | | | 8 | | | | | | | 14 |
| 5 | (7) Giuseppe Marzotto | 7 | | 0 | | | | 0 | | | 1 | | | | | 2 | | | | 3 | | | 1 |
| 5 | (8) Mauro Ferraccioli | 7 | | 1 | | | | 1 | | | 0 | | | | | 3 | | | | 2 | | | 0 |
| 6 | Austria | 9 | | | | | | | 4 | | | | | | | 7 | | | | | | | 9 |
| 6 | (1) Adi Funk | 8 | 1 | | | 3 | | | | 2 | | | 0 | | | | 1 | | | 1 |
| 6 | (2) Walter Grübmüller | 1 | 0 | | | 0 | | | | 0 | | | 1 | | | | 0 | | | 0 |
| 7 | (Socialist Federal Republic of Yugoslavia) Yugoslavia | 8 | | | | | | | 4 | | | | | | | 6 | | | | | | | 8 |
| 7 | (13) Stefan Kekec | 7 | | | | 2 | | | 1 | | | 1 | | | | 1 | | | 1 | | 1 |
| 7 | (14) Vlado Kocuvan | 1 | | | | 1 | | | 0 | | | 0 | | | | 0 | | | 0 | | 0 |
| Placing | Pair / Rider Name | Total | 1 | 2 | 3 | 4 | 5 | 6 | 7 | 8 | 9 | 10 | 11 | 12 | 13 | 14 | 15 | 16 | 17 | 18 | 19 | 20 | 21 | 22 |

m - exclusion for exceeding two minute time allowance • t - exclusion for touching the tapes • x - other exclusion • e - retired or mechanical failure • f - fell
ns - non-starter • nc - non-classify

| gate A - inside | gate B | gate C | gate D - outside |

== World final ==
- 20 June 1981
- (Poland) Silesian Stadium, Chorzów

| Placing | Pair / Rider Name | Total | 1 | 2 | 3 | 4 | 5 | 6 | 7 | 8 | 9 | 10 | 11 | 12 | 13 | 14 | 15 | 16 | 17 | 18 | 19 | 20 | 21 |
| 1 | United States | 23 | | | | | | | 8 | | | | | | | 16 | | | | | | | 23 |
| 1 | (1) Bruce Penhall | 14 | 3 | | | E | | | | 3 | | | 3 | | | | 3 | | | 2 |
| 1 | (2) Bobby Schwartz | 9 | 2 | | | 3 | | | | 0 | | | 2 | | | | 1 | | | 1 |
| 2 | New Zealand | 22 | | | | | | | 5 | | | | | | | 12 | | | | | | | 22 |
| 2 | (3) Ivan Mauger | 12 | 0 | | | | 1 | | | | 3 | | | 2 | | | | 3 | | | 3 |
| 2 | (4) Larry Ross | 10 | 1 | | | | 3 | | | | 2 | | | 0 | | | | 2 | | | 2 |
| 3 | Poland | 21 | | | | | | | 9 | | | | | | | 15 | | | | | | | 21 |
| 3 | (7) Zenon Plech | 15 | | 3 | | | | 3 | | | 1 | | | | | 3 | | | | 3 | | | 2 |
| 3 | (8) Edward Jancarz | 6 | | 1 | | | | 2 | | | 0 | | | | | 2 | | | | 0 | | | 1 |
| 4 | Czechoslovakia | 18 | | | | | | | 4 | | | | | | | 11 | | | | | | | 18 |
| 4 | (5) Aleš Dryml Sr. | 12 | | 2 | | | 0 | | | 2 | | | | | 3 | | | | 3 | | | 2 |
| 4 | (6) Jan Verner | 6 | | 0 | | | 2 | | | 1 | | | | | 1 | | | | 2 | | | 0 |
| 5 | Denmark | 17 | | | | | | | 10 | | | | | | | 13 | | | | | | | 17 |
| 5 | (11) Ole Olsen | 10 | | | 3 | | | | 3 | | | | 1 | | 2 | | | 1 | | | | | 0 |
| 5 | (12) Hans Nielsen | 7 | | | 2 | | | | 2 | | | | 0 | | 0 | | | 0 | | | | | 3 |
| 6 | England | 17 | | | | | | | 2 | | | | | | | 11 | | | | | | | 17 |
| 6 | (9) Dave Jessup | 7 | | | E | | | 0 | | | | 3 | | 3 | | | 0 | | | | | 1 |
| 6 | (10) Chris Morton | 10 | | | 1 | | | 1 | | | | 2 | | 1 | | | 2 | | | | | 3 |
| 7 | West Germany | 3 | | | | | | | 3 | | | | | | | 3 | | | | | | | 3 |
| 7 | (13) Egon Müller | 2 | | | | 2 | | | X | | | - | | | | - | | | - | | - |
| 7 | (14) Georg Gilgenreiner | 1 | | | | 1 | | | F | | | - | | | | - | | | - | | - |
| Placing | Pair / Rider Name | Total | 1 | 2 | 3 | 4 | 5 | 6 | 7 | 8 | 9 | 10 | 11 | 12 | 13 | 14 | 15 | 16 | 17 | 18 | 19 | 20 | 21 |

m - exclusion for exceeding two minute time allowance • t - exclusion for touching the tapes • x - other exclusion • e - retired or mechanical failure • f - fell
ns - non-starter • nc - non-classify

| gate A - inside | gate B | gate C | gate D - outside |

== See also ==
- 1981 Individual Speedway World Championship
- 1981 Speedway World Team Cup
- motorcycle speedway
- 1981 in sports
