= 1983 Australian Individual Speedway Championship =

Australian motorcycle speedway championship

The 1983 Australian Individual Speedway Championship was held at Speedway Park in Adelaide, South Australia on 21 January 1983.

Sydney rider Billy Sanders won his fifth Australian Championship and his record fourth in a row.

Sanders caused a stir when he famously told the unruly crowd that after the reception he got he might consider changing nationalities. He then told the crowd to "Get Stuffed" at the end of his victory speech while being unfairly booed following the unpopular decision by Adelaide-based meeting referee Sam Bass to exclude crowd favourite Phil Crump from their heat 14 clash which ultimately Crump the title. Sanders had won the start, but Crump had moved under him in turn 2 and sent the Sydney rider crashing into the concrete wall. To that point of the meeting, Crump had easily won his previous heats as well as twice breaking the 3 lap track record, while Sanders, who was also undefeated, had only just won his opening race after trailing Gary Guglielmi until finally passing him in the final turn. Ironically, in the re-run of the heat after Crump's exclusion Sanders would lower Crump's new track record by 5/100th's of a second with a new time of 51.22 for 3 laps of the 430 metres (470 yards) long clay surfaced track.

The leading local rider was Steve Baker who finished 8th with 7 points. Later in the year Baker would win the 1983 European (World) Under-21 Championship in Italy.

== 1983 Australian Solo Championship ==
- Australian Championship
- 21 January 1983
- Virginia, South Australia - Speedway Park
- Referee: (Australia) Sam Bass
- Qualification: The top two riders go through to the Overseas Final in Manchester, England.

Pos.	Rider	Points	Details
Gold	Billy Sanders ( (New South Wales) )	15	(3,3,3,3,3)
Silver	Glyn Taylor ( (Western Australia) )	13	(3,2,2,3,3)
Bronze	Phil Crump ( (Victoria (state)) )	12	(3,3,3,X,3)
4	Gary Guglielmi ( (New South Wales) )	11+3	(2,1,3,2,3+3)
5	Rod Hunter ( (Victoria (state)) )	11+2	(2,2,2,3,2+2)
6	Danny Kennedy ( (Victoria (state)) )	8	(1,1,3,3,0)
7	Les Sawyer ( (Western Australia) )	8	(1,3,1,2,1)
8	Steve Baker ( (South Australia) )	7	(3,0,2,0,2)
9	Mark Fiora ( (South Australia) )	7	(2,2,0,1,2)
10	John Titman ( (Queensland) )	7	(X,2,1,2,2)
11	Steve Regeling ( (Queensland) )	6	(0,3,0,2,1)
12	David Jackson ( (Northern Territory) )	4	(1,2,0,1,0)
13	Dean Johnson ( (Tasmania) )	4	(0,1,1,2,1)
14	Rod Ashton ( (Queensland) )	4	(2,0,1,1,0)
15	Kevin O'Connell ( (South Australia) ) (Res)	2	(-,-,2,-,-)
16	Wayne Baxter ( (Northern Territory) )	1	(0,0,0,0,1)
17	Tony Boyle ( (South Australia) ) (Res)	1	(1,-,-,-,-)
18	Chris Higgs ( (Tasmania) )	0	(0,0,0,0,0)

== See also ==
- Australia national speedway team
- Sport in Australia
- Motorcycle Speedway
