= Gary Guglielmi =

Australian speedway rider

- Born: 14 February 1958 (age 68); Sydney, New South Wales
- Nationality: Australian

Career history
- 1977–1984: Coventry Bees
- 1978, 1980: Boston Barracudas

Team honours
- 1978, 1979: British League Champion
- 1981: British League Cup Winner
- 1978, 1979, 1981, 1982: Midland Cup Winner

Gary Graham Christopher Guglielmi (born 14 February 1958 in Sydney, New South Wales) is a former Australian international Speedway rider who represented Australia in both test matches and in the World Pairs Championship. Guglielmi is of Maltese descent.

== Career ==
Guglielmi partnered fellow Sydney rider Billy Sanders in the 1982, 1983 and 1984 World Pairs Finals. The pair finished in fourth place in 1982 at their home track of Liverpool City Raceway in Sydney while improving to finish second in 1983 at the Ullevi Stadium in Gothenburg, Sweden. This could have easily been a World Championship win for Guglielmi had Sanders, who was otherwise undefeated on the day (and the track record holder at Ullevi), not fallen in turn two on lap one of Heat 16 when the Aussie pair faced the out of form West Germans Egon Müller and Karl Maier. Sanders had won the start from Guglielmi but was excluded (by Australian referee Sam Bass) for causing the race to be stopped. Guglielmi then easily won the re-run from the Germans and Australia ultimately finished one point behind England pair Peter Collins and Kenny Carter. They then finished in fifth place in 1984 at the Pista Speedway in Lonigo, Italy. 1984 would be the last time Guglielmi represented Australia in a Speedway World Pairs Championship Final.

Guglielmi rode in the United Kingdom for the Boston Barracudas and the Coventry Bees until 1984 when he was banned for a year by the Australian speedway authorities and served a prison sentence after being convicted of a drugs offence in Australia.

Guglielmi finished second behind Sanders in the 1982 Australian Solo Championship at the Claremont Speedway in Perth, and finished fourth in 1983 at Adelaide's Speedway Park behind Sanders, Glyn Taylor and Phil Crump.

== Personal life ==
Guglielmi later married the widow of Billy Sanders.

== World Final appearances ==
=== World Pairs Championship ===
- 1982 – (Australia) Sydney, Liverpool City Raceway (with Billy Sanders) – 4th – 16pts (5)
- 1983 – (Sweden) Gothenburg, Ullevi (with Billy Sanders) – 2nd – 24pts (9)
- 1984 – (Italy) Lonigo, Pista Speedway (with Billy Sanders) – 5th – 14pts (8)
