= Dennis Sigalos =

American speedway rider

- Born: August 16, 1959 (age 67); Garden Grove, California, United States

Career history
- 1979–1980: Hull Vikings
- 1981–1983, 1985: Ipswich Witches
- 1984: Wolverhampton Wolves

Individual honours
- 1980: Peter Craven Memorial winner
- 1980: Daily Mirror Grand Prix
- 1983: Golden Helmet of Pardubice
- 1982: Embassy British Open
- 1982: Littiechild Trophy
- 1983: Star of Anglia

Team honours
- 1982: World Pairs Champion
- 1981: British League KO Cup winner

Arthur Dennis Sigalos (born August 16, 1959) is an American former professional motorcycle speedway rider. He earned 52 caps for the United States national speedway team.

== Career ==
Born in Garden Grove, California, Sigalos was a rising star in speedway racing during the late 1970s. Sigalos served notice that he was a coming rider when he finished third in the 1980 American Final held on a makeshift track at the Anaheim Stadium in Los Angeles (the meeting was held on November 16, 1979), only missing a place in the Intercontinental Final when beaten in a runoff.

Earlier in 1979, Sigalos had made his debut in the British Leagues after signing with the Hull Vikings. He stayed in Hull for two years before joining the Ipswich Witches from 1981 to 1983. He then signed with the Wolverhampton Wolves for 1984.

In 1980, Sigalos rode in the European Under-21 Championship Final at the Rottalstadion in Pocking, West Germany. After being excluded from his first ride, he showed his class by eventually finishing 3rd with 11 points after defeating future triple World Champion Erik Gundersen in a runoff. The European U/21 Championship was renamed the World U/21 Championship in 1988. Sigalos also won the Peter Craven Memorial Trophy at the Hyde Road Speedway in Manchester in 1980.

Sigalos joined Ipswich Witches from Hull Vikings in 1981 after a record £35,000 deal which included fellow American John Cook. The pair helped the Witches win the Knockout Cup.

Sigalos' first serious attempt as a challenger for the Speedway World Championship came in 1981. He qualified to ride in the 1981 Intercontinental Final at Vojens in Denmark, but on a difficult night where the notorious Vojens weather struck, Sigalos could only manage 15th place and 1 point from his 5 rides and he failed to qualify for a place in the World Final at the Wembley Stadium. His childhood friend Bruce Penhall signalled his intentions for the World Championship by mastering the conditions with a 15-point maximum before going on to win the first of two consecutive World Championships.

Sigalos' first appearance in a World Final came in 1982 when he finished a strong third at the Los Angeles Memorial Coliseum behind winner Bruce Penhall and England's Les Collins (who was the only rider on the night to defeat defending champion Penhall). He made his second and last World Final in 1983 in West Germany, but struggled on the day and finished in 8th place having scored 8 points.

Sigalos became World Pairs Champion with Bobby Schwartz in November 1982 at the Liverpool City Raceway in Sydney, Australia. The pair could not repeat their 1982 success in the 1983 Final at Ullevi in Gothenburg, Sweden, finishing 4th.

The 1982 World Pairs Championship Final in Sydney was Sigalos' crowning achievement in speedway. In a totally dominant performance he was the only unbeaten rider on the night, easily defeating such riders as Ole Olsen, Hans Nielsen, Peter Collins, Kenny Carter, and local favourite Billy Sanders. His partner and team captain "Boogaloo" Bobby Schwartz proved his worth by finishing second to Sigalos in each of their six heats. The US riders won each of their heats with a 5-1 pointscore giving them a perfect 30 points for the night as they successfully defended the title won in 1981 by Schwartz and Bruce Penhall. By finishing the Final undefeated, and with the ending of the World Pairs Championship after 1993, Sigalos remains one of only three riders to achieve the feat, the others being Ivan Mauger in 1969 and Ole Olsen who did it in 1973 and 1975. 1982 was also the only time that the Pairs Championship was won with a maximum possible score. Both Sigalos and Schwartz attribute their dominance in Australia to the Carlisle tyres they imported especially for the meeting. Using the tyres, the American pair were never beaten out of the gates and rarely had any serious competition on the night.

Sigalos was runner up in the AMA National Speedway Championship in 1981 and 1982 and finished second and third for the United States in the 1980 and 1983 World Team Cups. Unfortunately he missed a place on the US Team when they won the 1982 World Team Cup Final at the White City Stadium in London.

In 1983, Sigalos became the first American to win the prestigious Golden Helmet of Pardubice in Czechoslovakia. As of 2014 he remains the only American rider to have won the Polish Golden Helmet.

After badly breaking his leg in a crash during the 1984 American Final at the Veterans Memorial Stadium in Long Beach, Sigalos retired from speedway riding at the relatively young age of 25, though he continues to be active in speedway in Southern California. Sigalos had won the 1983 American Final at the same venue with a 15-point maximum. He did make a short lived comeback with his former team Ipswich in 1985, but he retired for good shortly after.

== World final appearances ==
=== Individual World Championship ===
- 1982 - (United States) Los Angeles, Memorial Coliseum – 3rd – 12pts
- 1983 - (Germany) Norden, Motodrom Halbemond – 8th – 8pts

=== World Pairs Championship ===
- 1982 - (Australia) Sydney, Liverpool City Raceway (with – Bobby Schwartz) – Winner – 30pts (18)
- 1983 - (Sweden) Gothenburg, Ullevi (with – Bobby Schwartz) – 4th – 18pts (10)

=== World Team Cup ===
- 1980 - (Poland) Wrocław, Olympic Stadium (with Bruce Penhall / Scott Autrey / Bobby Schwartz / Ron Preston) – 2nd – 29pts (5)
- 1983 - (Denmark) Vojens, Speedway Center (with Bobby Schwartz / Lance King / Kelly Moran) – 3rd – 27pts (9)

=== Individual Under-21 World Championship ===
- 1980 - (West Germany) Pocking, Rottalstadion – 3rd – 11+3pts
