= Larry Ross (speedway rider) =

New Zealand motorcycle speedway rider

- Born: 15 June 1954 (age 72); Christchurch, New Zealand
- Nationality: New Zealander

Career history
- 1975–1980: Wimbledon Dons
- 1981–1984: Belle Vue Aces
- 1985: Halifax Dukes
- 1986: Bradford Dukes

Individual honours
- 1977: London Riders' Champion
- 1980: The Laurels
- 1976, 1977, 1978, 1979, 1980, 1985, 1988, 1989, 1990: New Zealand Champion
- 2006: New Zealand Long Track Champion

Team honours
- 1979: World Team Cup
- 1982: British League Champion
- 1979: Spring Gold Cup Winner
- 1983: British League Cup Winner

Larry Ross (born 15 June 1954) is a New Zealand former motorcycle speedway rider. He earned 26 caps for the New Zealand national speedway team.

== Life ==
Ross was born on 15 June 1954 in Christchurch, New Zealand.

== Career summary ==
Ross began riding at the Templeton track in Christchurch in 1972. He moved to England in 1975 and joined the Wimbledon Dons, where he spent six seasons from 1975 until 1980. He was a protege of the legendary Ivan Mauger. While riding at Plough Lane, he won the London Riders' Championship in 1977 and the London Cup three times. He also topped the team averages twice.

In 1979, Ross was a member of the New Zealand national speedway team, which won the World Team Cup. He was also a non-riding reserve for the 1979 World Final (won for a record 6th time by fellow Kiwi rider Ivan Mauger).

In 1980, Ross was third in the British League Riders' Championship and the following year he rode in the World Championship final at Wembley. In 1981, he switched from Wimbledon to join Belle Vue Aces and helped win the league title during the 1982 British League season. He left Belle Vue to join Halifax Dukes on loan for the 1985 British League season.

From 1977 to 1986, Ross rode in eight finals of the World Pairs Championship with Ivan Mauger and Mitch Shirra. Riding with Mauger he was runner-up in 1978 and in 1981.

During his long career, Ross won the New Zealand Championship a record nine times.

In 2006, Ross came out of retirement to win the New Zealand long track championship.

== World Final appearances ==
=== Individual World Championship ===
- 1979 – (Poland) Chorzów, Silesian Stadium - reserve - did not ride
- 1981 – (England) London, Wembley Stadium - 13th - 4pts

=== World Pairs Championship ===
- 1977 – (England) Manchester, Hyde Road (with Ivan Mauger) - 5th - 17pt (1)
- 1978 – (Poland) Chorzów, Silesian Stadium (with Ivan Mauger) - 2nd - 24pt (12)
- 1979 – (Denmark) Vojens, Vojens Speedway Center (with Ivan Mauger) - 6th - 12pt (6)
- 1980 – (Socialist Federal Republic of Yugoslavia) Krško, Matija Gubec Stadium (with Ivan Mauger) - 5th - 16pt (5)
- 1981 – (Poland) Chorzów, Silesian Stadium (with Ivan Mauger) - 2nd - 22pt (10)
- 1982 – (Australia) Sydney, Liverpool City Raceway (with Mitch Shirra) - 6th - 13pt (8)
- 1983 – (Sweden) Gothenburg, Ullevi (with Ivan Mauger) - 7th - 11pt (4)
- 1986 – (West Germany) Pocking, Rottalstadion (with Mitch Shirra) - 5th - 32pt (20)

=== World Team Cup ===
- 1979 – (England) London, White City (with Ivan Mauger / Mitch Shirra / Bruce Cribb / Roger Abel) - Winner - 35pt (11)
