= Steve Regeling =

Australian speedway rider

- Born: 2 October 1959 (age 67); Mount Isa, Queensland, Australia
- Nationality: Australian

Current club information
- Career status: Retired

Career history
- 1980-1983: Leicester Lions
- 1980: Workington Comets
- 1981: Boston Barracudas
- 1984-1988: Kings Lynn Stars
- 1988: Ipswich Witches
- 1988-1991: Exeter Falcons
- 1992-1993: Middlesbrough Bears

Individual honours
- 1987: Australian Champion
- 1985, 1987, 1988: Queensland State Champion

Team honours
- 1985, 1986: Australian Best Pairs Champion

Steven Grae Regeling (born 2 October 1959) is an Australian former motorcycle speedway rider who rode in the British League for Leicester Lions in the early 1980s and later for Kings Lynn Stars, before riding for several years in the National League for the Exeter Falcons and Middlesbrough Bears. He won the Australian Championship in 1987.

== Biography ==
Regeling was born in 1959 in Mount Isa, Queensland, Australia. His initial experience was in short track racing, in which his father and older brother had also competed. He then moved into speedway in Brisbane in the late 1970s with the famous Brisbane Exhibition Ground being his home track.

Regeling was signed by Martin Rogers for the Leicester Lions in 1980, but suffered a broken leg at Swindon at the start of the season. After recovering he was loaned out to the National League team Workington Comets, and impressive performances saw him recalled to ride for the Lions before the season ended. After being loaned out to Boston Barracudas in 1981, where he averaged 8.51 from 18 matches, he became a regular rider for the Lions in the two years that followed, until the club folded.

Regeling then moved on to the King's Lynn Stars in 1984 and also represented Australia at international level.

After finishing fourth in 1986, Regeling won the Australian championship in 1987 and finished runner-up to Phil Crump the following year.

Regeling later rode for the Exeter Falcons, for whom he was the number one rider for the whole of the 1990 season. At the end of the 1991, season he requested a transfer and moved to Middlesbrough, where his success continued, averaging over 8.7 in the 1992 season with two full maximum scores. His final season in Britain was in 1993.

Regeling represented Australia on numerous occasions in test matches at both home and abroad, and also in World Championship competitions such as the World Pairs Championship and World Team Cup.

== Career record ==
=== British leagues ===
Year	Team	League	Matches	Rides	Points	Bonus	Total	Average
1980	Workington Comets	National	13	39	14	4	18	4.51
1980	Leicester Lions	British	6	13	11	2	13	4.00
1981	Boston Barracudas	National	42	179	341	38	379	8.47
1981	Leicester Lions	British	12	30	20	5	25	3.33
1982	Leicester Lions	British	39	147	154	33	187	5.09
1983	Leicester Lions	British	42	168	208	42	250	5.95
1984	Kings Lynn Stars	British	54	221	334	31	365	6.61
1985	Kings Lynn Stars	British	38	148	198	31	229	6.19
1986	Kings Lynn Stars	British	37	137	136	25	161	4.70
1987	Kings Lynn Stars	British	40	165	240	25	265	6.42
1988	Kings Lynn Stars	British	1	4	4	2	6	6.00
1988	Ipswich Witches	British	15	60	71	10	81	5.40
1988	Exeter Falcons	National	14	80	144	14	158	7.90
1988	Sheffield Tigers	British	3	13	16	1	17	5.23
1988	Bradford Dukes	British	1	6	7	0	7	4.67
1989	Exeter Falcons	National	42	227	514	39	553	9.74
1990	Exeter Falcons	National	34	184	458	11	469	10.20
1991	Exeter Falcons	British League Div 2	21	97	199	13	212	8.74
1992	Middlesbrough Bears	British League Div 2	22	121	269	7	276	9.12
1993	Middlesbrough Bears	British League Div 2	41	207	378	23	401	7.75

== World Final Appearances ==
=== World Pairs Championship ===
- 1985 - (Poland) Rybnik, Rybnik Municipal Stadium (with Phil Crump) - 6th - 11pts (6)
- 1986 - (West Germany) Pocking, Rottalstadion (with Phil Crump) - 9th - 15pts (5)
- 1987 - (Czech Republic) Pardubice, Svítkov Stadion (with Steve Baker) - 7th - 21pts (5)

=== World Team Cup ===
Regeling was part of the Australia team in 1991. They finished second to eventual runners-up Sweden in the group stage, with Regeling top scorer for the team with 11 points.
