= Henk Steman =

Dutch speedway rider

- Born: 12 September 1948 (age 78); Voorburg, Netherlands
- Nationality: Dutch

Career history
- 1974: Oxford Rebels
- 1978: Bristol Bulldogs

Individual honours
- 1976, 1981, 1987: Dutch champion

Henk Steman (born 12 September 1948) is a former motorcycle speedway rider from the Netherlands. He earned 27 caps for the Netherlands national speedway team.

== Career ==
Steman came to prominence after joining the Oxford Rebels for the 1974 British League season. Although he had a poor season he soon became one of the leading riders in the Netherlands after becoming the Dutch champion, when winning the national title in 1976. He returned for another British league campaign for the 1978 British League season with the Bristol Bulldogs.

Steman represented the Netherlands national team for 15 years of World Cups from 1975 to 1988. He also rode for the Netherlands in the Speedway World Pairs Championship.

Steman also won two more national titles in 1981 and 1987.

== Family ==
Steman's brother Rob was also an international speedway rider.
