= West Germany national speedway team =

West Germany national motorcycle speedway team

West Germany
- SWC Wins: 0

The West Germany national speedway team were one of the teams that competed in international team motorcycle speedway.

== History ==
The West German speedway team competed in the inaugural Speedway World Team Cup in 1960, finishing second in the Central European Round. The following year in 1961, the East Germany national speedway team competed in their first World Cup and competed as a separate nation from West Germany.

In 1977, West Germany won a bronze medal in the Speedway World Pairs Championship but they struggled to progress through the World Cup rounds and it was not until the 1981 Speedway World Team Cup that they finally reached a final. Another appearance in the final came the following year in 1982.

The team became part of the Germany national speedway team in 1991, following the events that led to the German reunification between 1989 and 1991.

== Major tournament finals ==
=== World Team Championships ===
Year	Venue	Standings (Pts)	Riders	Pts
1981	(West Germany); Olching; Olching Speedwaybahn	1. Denmark (36); 2. England (29); 3. West Germany (28); 4. Soviet Union (3)	Egon Müller	10
1981	(West Germany); Olching; Olching Speedwaybahn	1. Denmark (36); 2. England (29); 3. West Germany (28); 4. Soviet Union (3)	Karl Maier	8
1981	(West Germany); Olching; Olching Speedwaybahn	1. Denmark (36); 2. England (29); 3. West Germany (28); 4. Soviet Union (3)	Georg Hack	5
1981	(West Germany); Olching; Olching Speedwaybahn	1. Denmark (36); 2. England (29); 3. West Germany (28); 4. Soviet Union (3)	Georg Gilgenreiner	5
1981	(West Germany); Olching; Olching Speedwaybahn	1. Denmark (36); 2. England (29); 3. West Germany (28); 4. Soviet Union (3)	Alois Wiesböck	0
1982	(England); London; White City Stadium	1. United States (37); 2. Denmark (24); 3. West Germany (18); 4. Czechoslovakia (17)	Karl Maier	7
1982	(England); London; White City Stadium	1. United States (37); 2. Denmark (24); 3. West Germany (18); 4. Czechoslovakia (17)	Egon Müller	5
1982	(England); London; White City Stadium	1. United States (37); 2. Denmark (24); 3. West Germany (18); 4. Czechoslovakia (17)	Georg Hack	5
1982	(England); London; White City Stadium	1. United States (37); 2. Denmark (24); 3. West Germany (18); 4. Czechoslovakia (17)	Georg Gilgenreiner	1
1982	(England); London; White City Stadium	1. United States (37); 2. Denmark (24); 3. West Germany (18); 4. Czechoslovakia (17)	Alois Wiesböck	0

=== World Pairs Championship ===
Year	Venue	Standings (Pts)	Riders	Pts
1968	(West Germany); Kempten; Kempten Speedway	1. Sweden (24); 2. (United Kingdom) Great Britain (12); 3. Norway (16); 4. West Germany B (12); 5. West Germany A (10); 6. Denmark (6)	Peter Barth	9 (B)
1968	(West Germany); Kempten; Kempten Speedway	1. Sweden (24); 2. (United Kingdom) Great Britain (12); 3. Norway (16); 4. West Germany B (12); 5. West Germany A (10); 6. Denmark (6)	Rudolf Kastl	3 (B)
1968	(West Germany); Kempten; Kempten Speedway	1. Sweden (24); 2. (United Kingdom) Great Britain (12); 3. Norway (16); 4. West Germany B (12); 5. West Germany A (10); 6. Denmark (6)	Manfred Poschenreider	8 (A)
1968	(West Germany); Kempten; Kempten Speedway	1. Sweden (24); 2. (United Kingdom) Great Britain (12); 3. Norway (16); 4. West Germany B (12); 5. West Germany A (10); 6. Denmark (6)	Fred Aberl	2 (A)
1975	(Poland); Wrocław; Stadion Olimpijski	1. Sweden (24); 2. Poland (23); 3. Denmark (20); 4. England (20); 5. Australia (19); 6. West Germany (10); 7. Austria (10)	Christoph Betzl	6
1975	(Poland); Wrocław; Stadion Olimpijski	1. Sweden (24); 2. Poland (23); 3. Denmark (20); 4. England (20); 5. Australia (19); 6. West Germany (10); 7. Austria (10)	Fritz Baur	4
1977	(England); Manchester; Hyde Road	1. England (28); 2. Sweden (18); 3. West Germany (18); 4. Czechoslovakia (17); 5. New Zealand (17); 6. Finland (14); 7. Australia (12)	Egon Müller	11
1977	(England); Manchester; Hyde Road	1. England (28); 2. Sweden (18); 3. West Germany (18); 4. Czechoslovakia (17); 5. New Zealand (17); 6. Finland (14); 7. Australia (12)	Hans Wassermann	7
1978	(Poland); Chorzów; Stadion Śląski	1. England (24); 2. New Zealand (24); 3. Denmark (21); 4. Czechoslovakia (18); 5. Poland (15); 6. West Germany (13); 7. Sweden (11)	Georg Hack	8
1978	(Poland); Chorzów; Stadion Śląski	1. England (24); 2. New Zealand (24); 3. Denmark (21); 4. Czechoslovakia (18); 5. Poland (15); 6. West Germany (13); 7. Sweden (11)	Hans Wassermann	5
1981	(Poland); Chorzów; Stadion Śląski	1. United States (28); 2. New Zealand (22); 3. Poland (21); 4. Czechoslovakia (18); 5. Denmark (17); 6. England (9); 7. West Germany (3)	Egon Müller	2
1981	(Poland); Chorzów; Stadion Śląski	1. United States (28); 2. New Zealand (22); 3. Poland (21); 4. Czechoslovakia (18); 5. Denmark (17); 6. England (9); 7. West Germany (3)	Georg Gilgenreiner	1
1983	(Sweden); Göteborg; Ullevi	1. England (25); 2. Australia (24); 3. Denmark (19); 4. United States (18); 5. Sweden (16); 6. West Germany (12); 7. New Zealand (11)	Karl Maier	6
1983	(Sweden); Göteborg; Ullevi	1. England (25); 2. Australia (24); 3. Denmark (19); 4. United States (18); 5. Sweden (16); 6. West Germany (12); 7. New Zealand (11)	Egon Müller	6
1986	(West Germany); Pocking; Rottalstadion	1. Denmark (46); 2. United States (46); 3. Czechoslovakia (32); 4. Sweden (32); 5. New Zealand (32); 6. West Germany (27); 7. England (23); 8. Italy (15); 9. Australia (15)	Karl Maier	22
1986	(West Germany); Pocking; Rottalstadion	1. Denmark (46); 2. United States (46); 3. Czechoslovakia (32); 4. Sweden (32); 5. New Zealand (32); 6. West Germany (27); 7. England (23); 8. Italy (15); 9. Australia (15)	Klaus Lausch	5
1988	(England); Bradford; Odsal Stadium	1. Denmark (45); 2. England (41); 3. United States (39); 4. New Zealand (32); 5. Sweden (26); 6. Hungary (25); 7. Italy (21); 8. West Germany (21); 9. Poland (17)	Gerd Riss	17
1988	(England); Bradford; Odsal Stadium	1. Denmark (45); 2. England (41); 3. United States (39); 4. New Zealand (32); 5. Sweden (26); 6. Hungary (25); 7. Italy (21); 8. West Germany (21); 9. Poland (17)	Tommy Dunker	4
1989	(Poland); Leszno; Alfred Smoczyk Stadium	1. Denmark (48); 2. Sweden (44); 3. England (37); 4. West Germany (36); 5. Finland (31); 6. Hungary (22); 7. Czechoslovakia (25); 8. Italy (15); 9. Poland (11)	Karl Maier	22
1989	(Poland); Leszno; Alfred Smoczyk Stadium	1. Denmark (48); 2. Sweden (44); 3. England (37); 4. West Germany (36); 5. Finland (31); 6. Hungary (22); 7. Czechoslovakia (25); 8. Italy (15); 9. Poland (11)	Gerd Riss	14
1990	(West Germany); Landshut; Ellermühle Stadium	1. Denmark (43); 2. Australia (41); 3. Hungary (33); 4. Sweden (33); 5. New Zealand (32); 6. United States (28); 7. Czechoslovakia (21); 8. England (20); 9. West Germany (15)	Klaus LauschZ	15
1990	(West Germany); Landshut; Ellermühle Stadium	1. Denmark (43); 2. Australia (41); 3. Hungary (33); 4. Sweden (33); 5. New Zealand (32); 6. United States (28); 7. Czechoslovakia (21); 8. England (20); 9. West Germany (15)	Gerd Riss	0

== International caps ==
Caps limited to West Germany only (East Germany and unified Germany not included).

Rider	Caps
Angermüller, Josef	14
Betzl, Chritophh	24
Deser, Stefan	2
Hack, Georg	26
Lausch, Klaus	27
Maier, Karl	38
Mouncer, Rob	1
Muller, Egon	44
Pelzmann, Carsten	1
Pollehn, Andre	4
Riss, Gerd	22
Schroeck, Peter	1
Wassermann, Hans	15
Wiesböck, Alois	24
Würtele, Peter	6

== See also ==
- German Individual Speedway Championship
- German Speedway Championship
- Germany national speedway team
- East Germany national speedway team
