= Frits Koppe =

Dutch speedway rider

- Born: 1 February 1953 (age 73); Voorburg, Netherlands
- Nationality: Dutch

Career history
- 1978: King's Lynn Stars

Individual honours
- 1977, 1985: Dutch champion

Frits Koppe (born 1 February 1953) is a former motorcycle speedway rider from the Netherlands. He earned 21 caps for the Netherlands national speedway team.

== Career ==
Koppe came to prominence in 1977 after he became the Dutch champion, when winning the national title. This led to him being signed by the King's Lynn Stars for the 1978 British League season and rode in a cup semi-final.

Despite only spending the one season in the British leagues, Koppe represented the Netherlands national team for 12 years of World Cups from 1975 to 1981 and 1984 to 1986. He also rode for the Netherlands in the Speedway World Pairs Championship and would ride for them 21 times in total. He would also capture a second national title in 1985.
