= Netherlands national speedway team =

Netherlands national motorcycle speedway team

Netherlands
- SWC Wins: 0

The Netherlands national speedway team are one of the teams that compete in international team motorcycle speedway.

== History ==
The Dutch speedway team first competed in international competition in test matches during 1937, although the Netherlands national long track team had already held test matches.

The team competed at the inaugural Speedway World Team Cup, finishing fourth in the Central European round at the 1960 Speedway World Team Cup. However, they did not participate in the World Cup again until the 1975 Speedway World Team Cup.

From 1975, the team competed in nearly every World Team Cup until 2001, when the competition was rebranded the Speedway World Cup. However, the team struggled to fair any better than reaching the quarter final stage and since 2001, the team have failed to qualify for the World Cup and have been overshadowed by the Longtrack team, who have been world champions three times in 2013, 2016 and 2023.

== International caps ==
Since the advent of the Speedway Grand Prix era, international caps earned by riders is largely restricted to international competitions, whereas previously test matches between two teams were a regular occurrence.

Rider	Caps
Bangma, Henk	4
Bathoorn, Leo	
Bisschops, Thei	
Bos, Henk	
Dolman, Bob	
Egges, Tonny	
Eijbergen, Erik	
Elzinga, Rene	
Geurtz, Ralph	
Groen, Emiel	
Groen, Jim	
Groen, Maik	
Koning, Frits	
Koppe, Frits	21
Koppe, Ron	
Kroeze, Henny	26
Kroeze, Tonny	
Munnecom, Robert Jan	
Muts, Rudi	18
Pijper, Theo	2
Seur, Piet	10
Steman, Henk	27
Steman, Rob	10
Stroes, Wil	
van Dam, Ron	
van Deijk, Jan	
van der Sluis, Hans	
Verbrugge, Patrick	
Verbrugge, Roy	
