= Yugoslavia national speedway team =

Yugoslavian national motorcycle speedway team

Yugoslavia
- SWC wins: 0 Best result World Pairs finalists (1970, 1971, 1980)

The Yugoslavia national speedway team were one of the teams that competed in international team motorcycle speedway.

== History ==
The Yugoslavian speedway team first competed in the Speedway World Team Cup during the 1962 Speedway World Team Cup, finishing second in the central European round. Throughout the history of World Team Cup, the team were regular World Cup competitors from 1962 until their final World Cup in 1992. However, they were one of the weaker nations and failed to reach the latter stages of the competition.

Following the breakup of Yugoslavia, the riders then competed for their new speedway nations, primarily Croatia and Slovenia.

== Major world finals ==
=== World Pairs Championship ===
Year	Venue	Standings (Pts)	Riders	Pts
1970	(Sweden); Malmö; Malmö Stadion	1. New Zealand (28); 2. Sweden (25); 3. England (19); 4. Scotland (18); 5. Czechoslovakia (11); 6. (Socialist Federal Republic of Yugoslavia) Yugoslavia (7); 7. Denmark (nc)	Drago Perko	6
1970	(Sweden); Malmö; Malmö Stadion	1. New Zealand (28); 2. Sweden (25); 3. England (19); 4. Scotland (18); 5. Czechoslovakia (11); 6. (Socialist Federal Republic of Yugoslavia) Yugoslavia (7); 7. Denmark (nc)	Ivan Kos	1
1971	(Poland); Rybnik; Rybnik Municipal Stadium	1. Poland (30); 2. New Zealand (25); 3. Sweden (22); 4. Czechoslovakia (17); 5. Scotland (16); 6. (Socialist Federal Republic of Yugoslavia) Yugoslavia (10); 7. Austria (6)	Ivan Molan	5
1971	(Poland); Rybnik; Rybnik Municipal Stadium	1. Poland (30); 2. New Zealand (25); 3. Sweden (22); 4. Czechoslovakia (17); 5. Scotland (16); 6. (Socialist Federal Republic of Yugoslavia) Yugoslavia (10); 7. Austria (6)	Drasco Orsic	5
1980	(Socialist Federal Republic of Yugoslavia); Krško; Matija Gubec Stadium	1. England (29); 2. Poland (22); 3. Denmark (21); 4. Sweden (18); 5. New Zealand (16); 6. Finland (14); 7. (Socialist Federal Republic of Yugoslavia) Yugoslavia (6)	Stefan Kekeč	6
1980	(Socialist Federal Republic of Yugoslavia); Krško; Matija Gubec Stadium	1. England (29); 2. Poland (22); 3. Denmark (21); 4. Sweden (18); 5. New Zealand (16); 6. Finland (14); 7. (Socialist Federal Republic of Yugoslavia) Yugoslavia (6)	Vladislav Kočuvan	0

== International caps ==
Since the advent of the Speedway Grand Prix era, international caps earned by riders is largely restricted to international competitions, whereas previously test matches between two teams were a regular occurrence.

Rider	Caps
Babic, Evald	
Babič, Franc	
Caba, Lazar	
Džudović, Slobodan (Srb)	
Fleten, Đuro	
Frančić, Josip	
Gerjevic, Zvone	
Hauptmann, Igor	
Horvat, Artur	
Kalisnik, Milan	
Kekeč, Stefan	
Klasnetic, Damijan	
Kocmut, Albert	
Kočuvan, Vladislav	
Kos, Ivan	
Kosmut, Manfred	
Lazbaher, Jose	
Lekse, Gerhard (S)	
Joze Mavsar, Joze	
Medved, Valentin	
Miler, Vlado	
Milov, Joze	
Molan, Ivan	
Omerzel, Krešo (S)	
Orsic, Drasko	
Pavlic, Zvonko	
Perko, Drago	
Peterca, Martin (S)	2
Pintar, Gregor (S)	
Posedi, Ivan	
Pribovsek, Franc	
Regvart, Drago	
Sauperl, Franc	
Smidt, Ladislav	
Stanković, Milovan (Srb)	
Stojković, Milija (Srb)	
Tomazic, Janez	
Tominac, Darko	
Tomanic, Zdravko	
Toplisek, Radovan	
Vobujak, Ivan	
Visocnik, Joze	
Vurzer, Alojz	
Vrbnjak, Ivan	
Zagar, Franc	
Zibert, Joze	

Key

- (S) Slovenian
- (C) Croatian
- (Srb) Serbian
