= Henny Kroeze =

Dutch motorcycle racer

- Born: 11 March 1952 (age 74); Zenderen, Netherlands
- Nationality: Dutch

Career history
- 1974-1977: Halifax Dukes
- 1978: Bristol Bulldogs
- 1979-1980: Sheffield Tigers

Individual honours
- 1983, 1987: Finalist; Individual Speedway World Championship
- 1972, 1974, 1975 1978, 1980, 1982, 1983 1984, 1985, 1986: Dutch National Championship

Team honours
- 1979: Northern Trophy Winner

Hendrikus Constantinus Jozef Kroeze (born 11 March 1952) is a former Dutch motorcycle speedway rider. He earned 26 caps for the Dutch national speedway team.

== Career ==
Kroeze is a ten-time Dutch speedway champion. He was also finalist in the Individual Speedway World Championship twice; in 1983 and 1987.

Kroeze rode for Halifax Dukes from 1974 to 1977.

Since his retirement from racing, Kroeze has taken over Hell on Wheels, a Wall of death carnival side show.

== World Final Appearances ==
=== Individual World Championship ===
- 1983 - (Germany) Norden, Motodrom Halbemond - reserve - did not ride
- 1987 - (Netherlands) Amsterdam, Olympic Stadium - 16th - 1pt
