= 1991 Individual Speedway World Championship =

Motorcycle speedway world championship season

Seasons
- ← 1990 1992 →

The 1991 Individual Speedway World Championship was the 46th edition of the official World Championship to determine the world champion rider.

Diminutive Danish rider Jan O. Pedersen won his first and only World Championship with a 15-point maximum from his five rides, the last time a rider would have a perfect score in the Final. Local favourite Tony Rickardsson finished second with 12 points, with triple champion Hans Nielsen of Denmark finishing third on 11 points after defeating fellow Dane Tommy Knudsen in a run-off. Defending champion Per Jonsson finished in ninth place with 7 points.

== First round ==
=== British qualifiers ===
- Top 32 to British-Semi finals

== Second round ==
=== Australian qualification ===
| Date | Championship | Venue | Winner | 2nd | 3rd |
|---|---|---|---|---|---|
| 17 Nov '90 | Northern Territory | Tennant Creek Speedway | Wayne Bridgeford | Glen Baxter | Trevor O'Brien |
| 1 Dec '90 | Queensland | Mac's Speedway, Mackay | Troy Butler | Darren Winkler | Alan Rivett |
| 23 Dec '90 | Victorian | Olympic Park, Mildura | Leigh Adams | Jason Lyons | Phil Crump |
| 26 Dec '90 | New South Wales | Newcastle Motordrome, Tomago | Craig Boyce | Todd Wiltshire | Stephen Davies |
| 28 Dec '90 | Western Australian | Claremont Speedway, Perth | Glenn Doyle | David Cheshire | Michael Carter |
| 29 Dec '90 | South Australian | Riverview Speedway, Murray Bridge | Shane Parker | Damon Richardson | Brett Tomkins |
| 19 Jan 1991 | Last Chance | Arunga Park Speedway, Alice Springs | Shane Bowes | Scott Norman | Mark Lemon |

=== New Zealand qualification ===
| Date | Championship | Venue | Winner | 2nd | 3rd |
|---|---|---|---|---|---|
| ?? | South Island Final | Ruapuna Speedway, Christchurch | Mark Lyndon | ?? | ?? |
| ?? | North Island Final | Gisborne Speedway, Gisborne | David Bargh | ?? | ?? |

=== British semi-finals ===
- Top 16 to British final

== Third round ==
=== Continental preliminary round ===
- Riders progress to Continental quarter-finals

| Date | Venue | Winner | 2nd | 3rd |
|---|---|---|---|---|
| 4 May | (Poland) Olympic Stadium, Wrocław | (Czechoslovakia) Jan Holub II | (Czechoslovakia) Václav Verner | (Soviet Union) Oleg Kurguskin |
| 5 May | (Austria) Stadion Wiener Neustadt | (Poland) Dariusz Śledź | (Czechoslovakia) Zdeněk Schneiderwind | (Austria) Andreas Bössner |
| 5 May | (Germany) Anton Treffer Stadion, Neustadt | (Germany) Karl Maier | (Soviet Union) Mikhail Starostin | (Germany) Robert Barth |
| 5 May | (Socialist Federal Republic of Yugoslavia) Ilirija Sports Park, Ljubljana | (Socialist Federal Republic of Yugoslavia) Gregor Pintaro | (Italy) Fabrizzio Vesprini | (Germany) Markus Jans |

=== Swedish qualification ===
- Top 8 in each heat to Swedish final

(3 May, Nässjö Motorstadion, Nässjö)
| Pos | Rider | Points |
|---|---|---|
| 1 | Mikael Blixt | 13 |
| 2 | Conny Ivarsson | 11 |
| 3 | Jimmy Nilsen | 11 |
| 4 | Erik Stenlund | 10 |
| 5 | Mikael Karlsson | 10 |
| 6 | Tony Olsson | 9 |
| 7 | Mikael Ritterwall | 9 |
| 8 | Mikael Löfqvist | 8 |
| 9 | Niklas Karlsson | 7 |
| 10 | Olli Tyrväinen | 6 |
| 11 | Magnus Oscarsson | 6 |
| 12 | Patrik Karlsson | 6 |
| 13 | Christer Rohlén | 5 |
| 14 | Kenneth Nyström | 4 |
| 15 | Mikael Olsson | 4 |
| 16 | Joakim Karlsson | 1 |

(4 May, Tallhult Motorstadion, Hagfors)
| Pos | Rider | Points |
|---|---|---|
| 1 | Per Jonsson | 13 |
| 2 | Mikael Teurnberg | 13 |
| 3 | Tony Rickardsson | 13 |
| 4 | Henrik Gustafsson | 11 |
| 5 | Peter Karlsson | 11 |
| 6 | Claes Ivarsson | 9 |
| 7 | Peter Nahlin | 8 |
| 8 | Stefan Dannö | 7+3 |
| 9 | Dennis Löfqvist | 7+2 |
| 10 | Kenneth Lindby | 7+1 |
| 11 | Jörgen Johansson | 6 |
| 12 | Göran Flood | 5 |
| 13 | Robert Johansson | 4 |
| 14 | Anders Kling | 1 |
| 15 | Jimmy Engman | 1 |
| 16 | Lillebror Johansson | 0 |

=== Australian Final ===
- First 3 (+ *Leigh Adams seeded) to Commonwealth Final

=== New Zealand Final ===
- 14 February 1991
- (New Zealand) Awapuni Speedway, Gisborne
- First 2 to Commonwealth final

| Pos. | Rider | Total |
|---|---|---|
| 1 | David Bargh | 15 |
| 2 | Chris Martin | 14 |
| 3 | Mark Thorpe | 12 |
| 4 | John Tuffley | 11 |
| 5 | Justin Monk | 10 |
| 6 | Michael Long | 10 |
| 7 | Greg Fisher | 8 |
| 8 | John Roberts | 7 |
| 9 | Nathan Murray | 5 |
| 10 | Ricky Bennett | 5 |
| 11 | Jacqui Mauger | 5 |
| 12 | Dean Sullivan | 5 |
| 13 | Nick Young | 4 |
| 14 | Michael Hollow | 3 |
| 15 | Gary Marsh | 3 |
| 16 | Steve Etches | 0 |

=== British Final ===
- Top 10 to Commonwealth final plus 1 reserve

== Fourth round ==
=== Danish Final ===
- 19 May 1991
- (Denmark) Fladbro Speedway, Randers
- First 6 to Nordic final plus 1 reserve

| Pos. | Rider | Total |
|---|---|---|
| 1 | Jan O. Pedersen | 15 |
| 2 | Tommy Knudsen | 14 |
| 3 | Hans Nielsen | 12+3 |
| 4 | John Jörgensen | 12+2 |
| 5 | Gert Handberg | 10 |
| 6 | Bo Petersen | 9 |
| 7 | Jan Jacobsen | 8 |
| 8 | Brian Karger | 6 |
| 9 | Jan Staechmann | 6 |
| 10 | Jens-Henry Nielsen | 6 |
| 11 | Allan Johansen | 6 |
| 12 | Tom P. Knudsen | 5 |
| 13 | Per Sorensen | 4 |
| 14 | Jan Pedersen | 3 |
| 15 | Lars Munkedal | 3 |
| 16 | Lars-Henrik Jörgensen | 1 |

=== Finnish qualifying ===
- (Finland)
- Vesa Ylinen & Juha Moksunen seeded to Nordic final

=== Norwegian Final ===
- (Norway) Elgane Speedway, Varhaug
- 19 Aug 1990, top 1 (+1 seeded) to Nordic final 1991

| Pos. | Rider | Points |
|---|---|---|
| 1 | Lars Gunnestad | 15 |
| 2 | Kjell Øyvind Sola | 13 |
| 3 | Willy Tjessem | 12 |
| 4 | Robert Langeland | 11 |
| 5 | Atle Knutsen | 11 |
| 6 | Odd Pettersen | 11 |
| 7 | Jorn Arve Arda | 9 |
| 8 | Gjermund Aas | 9 |
| 9 | Bjorn Ivar Fauske | 5 |
| 10 | Marten Tunheim | 5 |
| 11 | Ingvar Hvamstad | 4 |
| 12 | Rolf Netland | 4 |
| 13 | Arnt Førland | 3 |
| 14 | Nils Mellomstrand | 1 |
| 15 | Anders Bjorkqvist | 1 |
| 16 | Per Erga | 0 |

=== Swedish Final ===
- (Sweden) 3 rounds, top 5 to Nordic final plus 1 reserve
- R1 (14 May, Kumla Motorstadion, Kumla)
- R2 (15 May, Ljungheden, Västervik)
- R3 (2 June, Gubbängens IP, Stockholm)

| Pos. | Rider | Scores | Total |
|---|---|---|---|
| 1 | Henrik Gustafsson | 15+14+11 | 40 |
| 2 | Per Jonsson | 11+11+14 | 37 |
| 3 | Tony Rickardsson | 12+12+9 | 33 |
| 4 | Jimmy Nilsen | 13+12+8 | 33 |
| 5 | Mikael Blixt | 8+9+12 | 29 |
| 6 | Erik Stenlund | 11+6+10 | 27 |
| 7 | Conny Ivarsson | 3+11+12 | 26 |
| 8 | Peter Karlsson | 8+8+7 | 23 |
| 9 | Stefan Dannö | 10+5+4 | 19 |
| 10 | Claes Ivarsson | 4+3+11 | 18 |
| 11 | Tony Olsson | 2+7+6 | 15 |
| 12 | Mikael Karlsson | 5+5+5 | 15 |
| 13 | Mikael Teurnberg | 7+1+5 | 13 |
| 14 | Peter Nahlin | 3+9+1 | 13 |
| 15 | Mikael Löfqvist | 5+4+1 | 10 |
| 16 | Mikael Ritterwall | 3+3+2 | 8 |

=== Continental quarter-finals ===
- Top 32 to Continental semi-finals

| Date | Venue | Winner | 2nd | 3rd |
|---|---|---|---|---|
| 1 June | (Poland) Rybnik Municipal Stadium, Rybnik | (Poland) Eugeniusz Skupień | (Hungary) Róbert Nagy | (Poland) Ryszard Dołomisiewicz |
| 2 June | (Germany) Günter Harder Stadion, Neubrandenburg | (Hungary) Zoltán Adorján | (Czechoslovakia) Václav Milík Sr. | (Hungary) Antal Kocso |
| 2 June | (Hungary) Borsod Volán Stadion, Miskolc | (Hungary) Zoltan Hajdu | (Poland) Tomasz Gollob | (Italy) Armando Castagna |
| 2 June | (Germany) Pfaffenhofen Speedway, Pfaffenhofen | (Czechoslovakia) Bohumil Brhel | (Soviet Union) Mikhail Starostin | (Poland) Jarosław Olszewski |

=== American Final ===
- 2 March 1991
- (United States) Veterans Memorial Stadium, Long Beach
- First 5 to Overseas final plus 1 reserve

| Pos. | Rider | Total |
|---|---|---|
| 1 | Rick Miller | 15 |
| 2 | Sam Ermolenko | 14 |
| 3 | Ronnie Correy | 13 |
| 4 | Kelly Moran | 11 |
| 5 | Billy Hamill | 10+3 |
| 6 | Bobby Ott | 10+2 |
| 7 | Gary Hicks | 9 |
| 8 | Bobby Schwartz | 7 |
| 9 | Mike Faria | 7 |
| 10 | Greg Hancock | 6 |
| 11 | Lance King | 5 |
| 12 | Louis Kossuth | 4 |
| 13 | Steve Lucero | 3 |
| 14 | Brad Oxley | 3 |
| 15 | Andy Northrup | 2 |
| 16 | Josh Larsen (Res) | 1 |
| 17 | John Kehoe | 0 |

=== Commonwealth Final ===
- 2 June 1991
- (England) Norfolk Arena, King's Lynn
- First 11 to Overseas final plus 1 reserve

| Pos. | Rider | Total |
|---|---|---|
| 1 | (England) Jeremy Doncaster | 14 |
| 2 | (Australia) Leigh Adams | 10+3 |
| 3 | (England) Joe Screen | 10+2 |
| 4 | (England) Paul Thorp | 10+1 |
| 5 | (England) Kelvin Tatum | 9 |
| 6 | (Australia) Glenn Doyle | 9 |
| 7 | (England) Neil Collins | 8 |
| 8 | (England) Gary Havelock | 8 |
| 9 | (Australia) Todd Wiltshire* | 7 |
| 10 | (England) Andy Smith | 7 |
| 11 | (New Zealand) Mitch Shirra | 7 |
| 12 | (England) Chris Louis | 6 |
| 13 | (England) Sean Wilson | 5 |
| 14 | (New Zealand) Gary Allan | 4 |
| 15 | (England) Martin Dugard | 4 |
| 16 | (Australia) Craig Boyce | 1 |

* Todd Wiltshire replaced Glyn Taylor

== Fifth round ==
=== Continental semi-finals ===
- 22 June
- (Germany) Ellermühle Speedway Stadium, Landshut
- Top 7 to World semi-final

| Pos. | Rider | Points |
|---|---|---|
| 1 | (Italy) Armando Castagna | 15 |
| 2 | (Czechoslovakia) Roman Matoušek | 14 |
| 3 | (Germany) Gerd Riss | 11+3 |
| 4 | (Soviet Union) Mikhail Starostin | 11+2 |
| 5 | (Poland) Wojciech Zaluski | 10 |
| 6 | (Czechoslovakia) Vladimir Kalina | 9 |
| 7 | (Czechoslovakia) Petr Vandírek | 8+3 |
| 8 | (Germany) Klaus Lausch | 8+2 |
| 9 | (Hungary) Zoltan Hajdu | 8+1 |
| 10 | (Czechoslovakia) Pavel Karnas | 7 |
| 11 | (Germany) Robert Barth | 6 |
| 12 | (Czechoslovakia) Bohumil Brhel | 4 |
| 13 | (Poland) Tomasz Gollob | 3 |
| 14 | (Hungary) Robert Csillik | 3 |
| 15 | (Hungary) Csaba Hell | 2 |
| 16 | (Poland) Jaroslaw Olszewski | 1 |

- 23 June
- (Italy) Santa Marina Stadium, Lonigo
- Top 7 to World semi-final

| Pos. | Rider | Points |
|---|---|---|
| 1 | (Poland) Ryszard Dolomisiewicz | 12 |
| 2 | (Hungary) Zoltán Adorján | 11+3 |
| 3 | (Hungary) Róbert Nagy | 11+2 |
| 4 | (Soviet Union) Rif Saitgareev | 11+1 |
| 5 | (Poland) Václav Milík Sr. | 11+0 |
| 6 | (Czechoslovakia) Zdeněk Schneiderwind | 10 |
| 7 | (Hungary) József Petrikovics | 10 |
| 8 | (Czechoslovakia) Antonín Kasper Jr. | 9 |
| 9 | (Hungary) Antal Kocso | 8 |
| 10 | (Poland) Piotr Swist | 8 |
| 11 | (Soviet Union) Oleg Kurguskin | 5 |
| 12 | (Austria) Franz Leitner | 3 |
| 13 | (Hungary) Zoltan Kovacs | 3 |
| 14 | (Czechoslovakia) Lubomir Jedek | 3 |
| 15 | (Poland) Eugeniusz Skupien | 2 |
| 16 | (Germany) Tommy Dunker | 1 |
| 17 | (Poland) Miroslaw Kowalik (res) | 1 |

=== Nordic Final ===
- 23 June 1991
- (Denmark) Nordjylland Speedway Center, Brovst
- First 9 to World Semi-final plus 1 reserve

| Pos. | Rider | Total |
|---|---|---|
| 1 | (Denmark) Hans Nielsen | 13 |
| 2 | (Denmark) Jan O. Pedersen | 12 |
| 3 | (Sweden) Jimmy Nilsen | 11 |
| 4 | (Sweden) Henrik Gustafsson | 10 |
| 5 | (Sweden) Per Jonsson | 9 |
| 6 | (Norway) Lars Gunnestad | 9 |
| 7 | (Denmark) Gert Handberg | 8 |
| 8 | (Denmark) Tommy Knudsen | 8 |
| 9 | (Sweden) Mikael Blixt | 8 |
| 10 | (Sweden) Tony Rickardsson | 7+3 |
| 11 | (Norway) Einar Kyllingstad | 7+2 |
| 12 | (Finland) Vesa Ylinen | 7+1 |
| 13 | (Denmark) Bo Petersen | 4 |
| 14 | (Denmark) John Jörgensen | 4 |
| 15 | (Finland) Juha Moksunen | 1 |
| 16 | (Norway) Tor Einar Hielm | 1 |

=== Overseas Final ===
- 23 June 1991
- (England) Odsal Stadium, Bradford
- First 9 to World Semi-final plus 1 reserve

| Pos. | Rider | Total |
|---|---|---|
| 1 | (England) Kelvin Tatum | 13 |
| 2 | (United States) Sam Ermolenko | 12+3 |
| 3 | (United States) Billy Hamill | 12+2 |
| 4 | (England) Andy Smith | 11 |
| 5 | (England) Paul Thorp | 10 |
| 6 | (United States) Ronnie Correy | 9 |
| 7 | (England) Jeremy Doncaster | 7 |
| 8 | (New Zealand) Mitch Shirra | 7 |
| 9 | (United States) Kelly Moran | 7 |
| 10 | (Australia) Todd Wiltshire | 6+3 |
| 11 | (Australia) Glenn Doyle | 6+2 |
| 12 | (England) Joe Screen | 5 |
| 13 | (United States) Rick Miller | 4 |
| 14 | (England) Gary Havelock | 4 |
| 15 | (Australia) Leigh Adams | 4 |
| 16 | (England) Neil Collins | 3 |

== Sixth round ==
=== World Semi-Finals ===
- 11 August 1991
- (Soviet Union) Rivne Speedway Stadium, Rivne
- First 8 to World final plus 1 reserve

| Pos. | Rider | Points |
|---|---|---|
| 1 | (United States) Billy Hamill | 12 |
| 2 | (Sweden) Jimmy Nilsen | 11 |
| 3 | (Sweden) Per Jonsson | 10+3 |
| 4 | (England) Paul Thorp | 10+2 |
| 5 | (Czechoslovakia) Roman Matoušek | 9 |
| 6 | (Italy) Armando Castagna | 9 |
| 7 | (England) Jeremy Doncaster | 9 |
| 8 | (New Zealand) Mitch Shirra | 9 |
| 9 | (Sweden) Mikael Blixt | 8+3 |
| 10 | (Sweden) Henrik Gustafsson | 8+2 |
| 11 | (Czechoslovakia) Vladimír Kalina | 7 |
| 12 | (Norway) Lars Gunnestad | 6 |
| 13 | (Hungary) Zoltán Adorján | 4 |
| 14 | (Czechoslovakia) Petr Vandírek | 4 |
| 15 | (Czechoslovakia) Antonín Kasper, Jr. (Res) | 2 |
| 16 | (Hungary) Róbert Nagy | 1 |
| 17 | (Soviet Union) Rif Saitgareev | 1 |

- 18 August 1991
- (Germany) Abensberger Stadion, Abensberg
- First 8 to World final plus 1 reserve

| Pos. | Rider | Points |
|---|---|---|
| 1 | (Denmark) Hans Nielsen | 15 |
| 2 | (Denmark) Jan O. Pedersen | 14 |
| 3 | (Denmark) Tommy Knudsen | 12 |
| 4 | (United States) Sam Ermolenko | 11 |
| 5 | (Sweden) Tony Rickardsson* | 10 |
| 6 | (United States) Ronnie Correy | 8 |
| 7 | (England) Kelvin Tatum | 8 |
| 8 | (Germany) Gerd Riss | 8 |
| 9 | (Denmark) Gert Handberg | 7+3 |
| 10 | (Hungary) József Petrikovics | 7+2 |
| 11 | (United States) Kelly Moran | 6 |
| 12 | (Poland) Wojciech Załuski | 5 |
| 13 | (Czechoslovakia) Václav Milík, Sr. | 3 |
| 14 | (Czechoslovakia) Zdeněk Schneiderwind | 3 |
| 15 | (Germany) Klaus Lausch | 2 |
| 16 | (Soviet Union) Mikhail Starostin | 1 |

* First reserve Tony Rickardsson replaced injured qualifier Andy Smith

== World final ==
- 31 August 1991
- (Sweden) Ullevi, Gothenburg

=== Classification ===
| Placing | Rider | Total | 1 | 2 | 3 | 4 | 5 | 6 | 7 | 8 | 9 | 10 | 11 | 12 | 13 | 14 | 15 | 16 | 17 | 18 | 19 | 20 | Pts | Pos |
|---|---|---|---|---|---|---|---|---|---|---|---|---|---|---|---|---|---|---|---|---|---|---|---|---|
| 1 | (Denmark) (15) Jan O. Pedersen | 15 | | | | 3 | | | 3 | | | 3 | | | | | | 3 | 3 | | | | 15 | 1 |
| 2 | (Sweden) (6) Tony Rickardsson | 12 | | 2 | | | | 3 | | | 3 | | | | | | | 2 | | | 2 | | 12 | 2 |
| 3 | (Denmark) (1) Hans Nielsen | 11+3 | 2 | | | | 3 | | | | 1 | | | | 3 | | | | 2 | | | | 11 | 3 |
| 4 | (Denmark) (2) Tommy Knudsen | 11+2 | 3 | | | | | 1 | | | | 1 | | | | 3 | | | | 3 | | | 11 | 4 |
| 5 | (Sweden) (3) Jimmy Nilsen | 10 | 0 | | | | | | 2 | | | | 2 | | | | 3 | | | | 3 | | 10 | 5 |
| 6 | (England) (10) Paul Thorp | 10 | | | 3 | | | 2 | | | | | | 2 | | | 2 | | 1 | | | | 10 | 6 |
| 7 | (United States) (16) Sam Ermolenko | 9 | | | | 2 | | | | 3 | 2 | | | | | | 0 | | | 2 | | | 9 | 7 |
| 8 | (England) (13) Kelvin Tatum | 8 | | | | 1 | 2 | | | | | | | 3 | | 2 | | | | | 0 | | 8 | 8 |
| 9 | (Sweden) (4) Per Jonsson | 7 | 1 | | | | | | | 2 | | | | 0 | | | | 1 | | | | 3 | 7 | 9 |
| 10 | (United States) (5) Ronnie Correy | 6 | | 3 | | | 0 | | | | | 0 | | | | | 1 | | | | | 2 | 6 | 10 |
| 11 | (Italy) (8) Armando Castagna | 6 | | 1 | | | | | | 1 | | | 3 | | | 1 | | | 0 | | | | 6 | 11 |
| 12 | (United States) (12) Billy Hamill | 6 | | | 2 | | | | | - | | 2 | | | 1 | | | | | | 1 | | 2 | 12 |
| 13 | (New Zealand) (7) Mitch Shirra | 4 | | 0 | | | | | 0 | | | | | 1 | 2 | | | | | 1 | | | 4 | 13 |
| 14 | (England) (11) Jeremy Doncaster | 2 | | | 1 | | | | 1 | | 0 | | | | | 0 | | | | | | 0 | 2 | 14 |
| 15 | (Czech Republic) (9) Roman Matoušek | 2 | | | 0 | | 1 | | | | | | 1 | | | | | 0 | | 0 | | | 2 | 15 |
| 16 | (Germany) (14) Gerd Riss | 1 | | | | 0 | | 0 | | | | | 0 | | 0 | | | | | | | 1 | 1 | 16 |
| | (Sweden) (17) Mikael Blixt | 0 | | | | | | | | 0 | | | | | | | | | | | | | 0 | |
| | (Denmark) (18) Gert Handberg | 0 | | | | | | | | | | | | | | | | | | | | | 0 | |
| Placing | Rider | Total | 1 | 2 | 3 | 4 | 5 | 6 | 7 | 8 | 9 | 10 | 11 | 12 | 13 | 14 | 15 | 16 | 17 | 18 | 19 | 20 | Pts | Pos |

m - exclusion for exceeding two minute time allowance • t - exclusion for touching the tapes • x - other exclusion • e - retired or mechanical failure • f - fell • ns - non-starter • nc - non-classify

| gate A - inside | gate B | gate C | gate D - outside |

| Pos. | Rider | Heat Scores | Total |
|---|---|---|---|
| 1 | (Denmark) Jan O. Pedersen | (3,3,3,3,3) | 15 |
| 2 | (Sweden) Tony Rickardsson | (2,3,3,2,2) | 12 |
| 3 | (Denmark) Hans Nielsen | (2,3,1,3,2) | 11+3 |
| 4 | (Denmark) Tommy Knudsen | (3,1,1,3,3) | 11+2 |
| 5 | (Sweden) Jimmy Nilsen | (0,2,2,3,3) | 10 |
| 6 | (England) Paul Thorp | (3,2,2,2,1) | 10 |
| 7 | (United States) Sam Ermolenko | (2,3,2,0,2) | 9 |
| 8 | (England) Kelvin Tatum | (1,2,3,2,0) | 8 |
| 9 | (Sweden) Per Jonsson | (1,2,0,1,3) | 7 |
| 10 | (United States) Ronnie Correy | (3,0,0,1,2) | 6 |
| 11 | (Italy) Armando Castagna | (1,1,3,1,0) | 6 |
| 12 | (United States) Billy Hamill | (2,X,2,1,1) | 6 |
| 13 | (New Zealand) Mitch Shirra | (0,0,1,2,1) | 4 |
| 14 | (Czech Republic) Roman Matoušek | (0,1,1,0,0) | 2 |
| 15 | (England) Jeremy Doncaster | (1,1,0,0,0) | 2 |
| 16 | (Germany) Gerd Riss | (0,0,0,0,1) | 1 |
| R1 | (Sweden) Mikael Blixt | (-,0,-,-,-) | 0 |
| R2 | (Denmark) Gert Handberg | (-,-,-,-,-) | - |
