= New Zealand Solo Championship =

New Zealand motorcycle speedway championship

New Zealand Championship
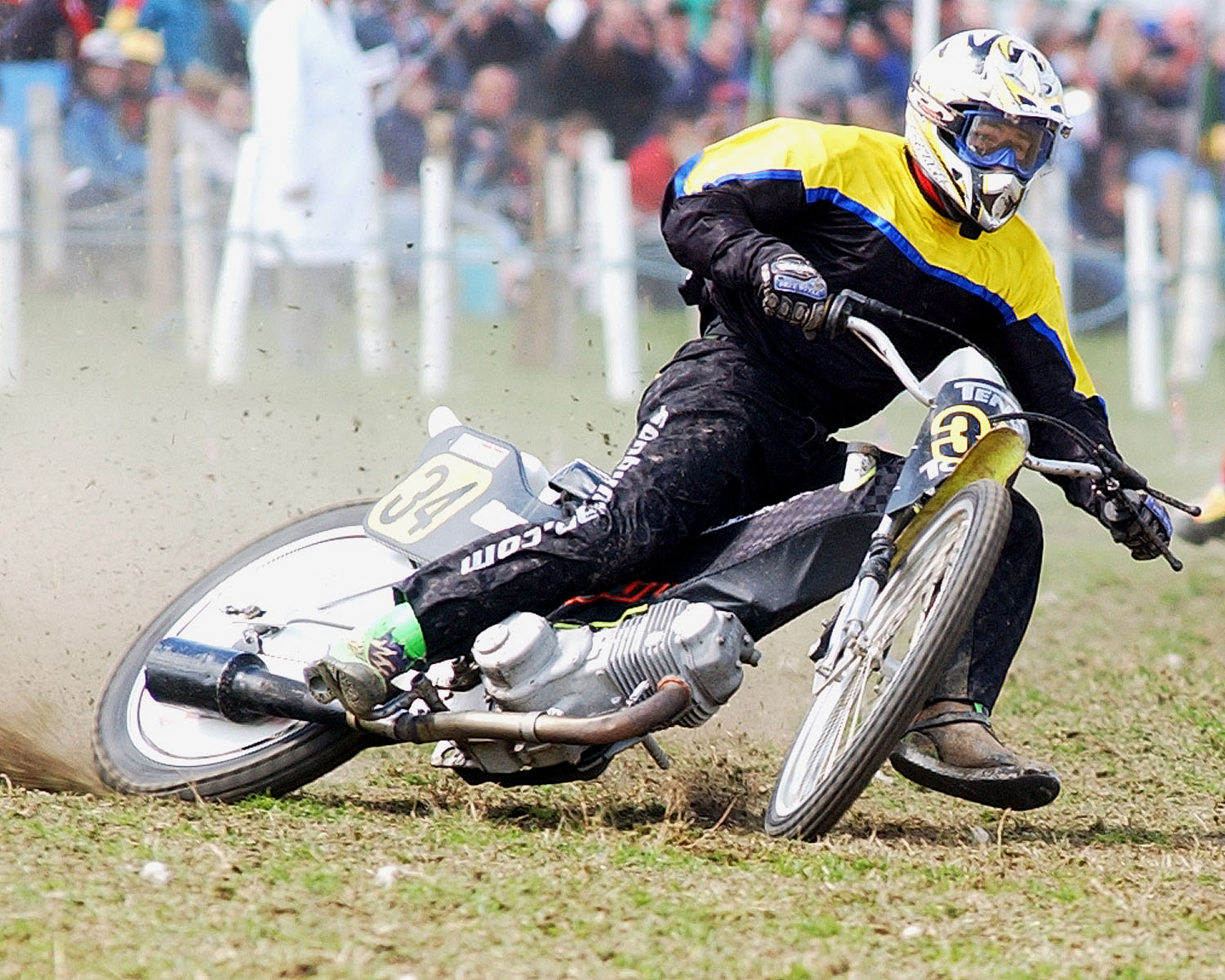
- Jason Bunyan, ten time winner
- Sport: motorcycle speedway
- Founded: 1929
- Most titles: Jason Bunyan (10)

The New Zealand Solo Championship is the annual individual motorcycle speedway championship of New Zealand. The championship has been running since 1929, although the event has not been held during various years.

== History ==
Throughout the history of the championship, New Zealand has produced some of the best riders of all-time. Ronnie Moore, the first world champion from the country in 1958, became the champion of the New Zealand on four occasions. Two legendary riders Ivan Mauger and Barry Briggs, who won ten world individual titles between them, only won four national championships because they spent significant parts of their careers based in England and did not always compete.

From 1979, the final of the New Zealand Solo Championship regularly doubled up as the New Zealand qualification round for the Speedway World Championship, although during various years this has not always been the case due to factors like licensing.

Since the early 1990s, the standard of speedway in New Zealand has decreased significantly and no rider has managed to win a competition of note.

== Key ==
- Unless stated, all riders are from New Zealand
- (wc) indicates that it was a world championship qualifier

== Past winners ==
Year	Venue	Winner	Runner-up	3rd place
1929	Kilbirnie Speedway	Dave Managh		
1930	Kilbirnie Speedway	Alf Mattson	Harry Mangham	Eddie Naylor
1931	Western Springs Stadium	Alf Mattson	Wally Kilmister	
	1932 not held			
1933	Monica Park	Charlie Blacklock	Norm Grey	
	1934 to 1935 not held			
1936	Monica Park	Wally Kilmister	Wally Rhodes	
	1937-1940 not held			
1941	Western Springs Stadium	Charlie Buchanan	Ron Seed	Henry Falls
	1942-1944 not held due to World War II			
1945	Western Springs Stadium	Jack Hunt	Ron Seed	Norman Morgan
1946	Western Springs Stadium	Len Perry	Norman Morgan	George Mudgway
1947	Western Springs Stadium	Gil Craven ( (England) )	Harold Fairhurst	George Mudgway
1948	Western Springs Stadium	Jack Hunt	Len Perry	Alf Clarkin
1949	Palmerston North Showgrounds	Harold Fairhurst	Gil Craven ( (England) )	Bruce Abernethy
1950	Hutt Speedway	Bruce Abernethy	Alf Clarkin	Trevor Redmond
1951	Aranui Speedway	Bruce Abernethy	Jack Parker ( (England) )	Peter Dykes
1952	Tahuna Park Speedway	Ron Johnston	Mick Holland	Maury Dunn / Norman Parker ( (England) )
1953	Not held			
1954	Western Springs Stadium	Harold Fairhurst	Merv Neil	Gerald Jackson ( (England) )
1955	Not held			
1956	Aranui Speedway	Ronnie Moore	Eric Williams ( (Wales) )	Ron Mountford ( (England) )
1957	Not held			
1958	Rotorua Speedway	Maury Dunn	Jules Benson	Goog Allen
1959	Rotorua Speedway	Barry Briggs	Ivan Mauger	Len Jelaca
1960	Western Springs Stadium	Ray New	Maury Dunn	Bryce Subritzky
1961	Rotorua Speedway	Ray New	Maury Dunn	Bob Anderson
1962	Palmerston North Showgrounds	Ronnie Moore	Merv Neil	Ken McKinlay ( (Scotland) )
1963	Palmerston North Showgrounds	Barry Briggs	Ronnie Moore	Geoff Mardon
1964	Western Springs Stadium	Geoff Mardon	Peter Moore ( (Australia) )	Bob Andrews
1965	Ruapuna Speedway	Murray Burt	Allan Brown	Jack Hart
1966	Waiwakaiho Speedway	Bob Andrews	Murray Burt	Bryce Subritzky
1967	Ruapuna Speedway	Howard Cole ( (England) )	Doug Templeton ( (Scotland) )	Ronnie Moore
1968	Ruapuna Speedway	Ronnie Moore	Frank Shuter	Bob Andrews
1969	Palmerston North Showgrounds	Ronnie Moore	Bob Andrews	Goog Allen / Bill Andrew / Howard Cole
1970	Western Springs Stadium	Chris Bailey ( (England) )	Bill Andrew	Bryce Subritzky
1971	Ruapuna Speedway	Frank Shuter	Allan Brown	Roger Wright
1972	Ruapuna Speedway	Bruce Cribb	Roger Wright	Graeme Stapleton
1973	Western Springs Stadium	Gary Peterson	Bob Andrews	Graeme Stapleton
1974	Ruapuna Speedway	Ivan Mauger	Ronnie Moore	Barry Briggs
1975	Palmerston North Showgrounds	Dave Morton ( (England) )	John Davis ( (England) )	Craig Pendlebury ( (England) )
1976	Meeanee Speedway	Larry Ross	Colin Farquharson	Paul Church
1977	Stratford Speedway	Larry Ross	Graeme Stapleton	Robin Adlington
1978	Penlee Speedway	Larry Ross	Barry Briggs	Mike Fullerton
1979	Ruapuna Speedway (wc)	Larry Ross	Mitch Shirra	Ivan Mauger
1980	Western Springs Stadium (wc)	Larry Ross	David Bargh	Tony Briggs
1981	Meeanee Speedway (wc)	Ivan Mauger	Mitch Shirra	Larry Ross
1982	Western Springs Stadium	Mitch Shirra	John Goodall	David Bargh
1983	Ruapuna Speedway (wc)	Mitch Shirra	Larry Ross	David Bargh
1984	Penlee Speedway	Mitch Shirra	Larry Ross	David Bargh
1985	Ruapuna Speedway	Larry Ross	Alan Mason	Roger Wright
1986	Awapuni Speedway (wc)	David Bargh	Larry Ross	Mitch Shirra
1987	Western Springs Stadium (wc)	David Bargh	Mitch Shirra	Larry Ross
1988	Ruapuna Speedway (wc)	Larry Ross	David Bargh	Gary Allan
1989	Western Springs Stadium (wc)	Larry Ross	Gary Allan	Mark Thorpe
1990	Ruapuna Speedway (wc)	Larry Ross	Mark Thorpe	Craig Wilkie
1991	Awapuni Speedway (wc)	David Bargh	Chris Martin	Mark Thorpe
1992	Meeanee Speedway (wc)	Gary Allan	Mark Thorpe	Paul Atkins
1993	Ruapuna Speedway (wc)	Mark Thorpe	Mark Lyndon	Andy Walker
1994	Stratford Speedway (wc)	Mark Thorpe	Tony Nagel	Mark Jamieson
1995	Kihikihi Speedway	Andy Walker	Nathan Murray	Robert Davidson
1996	Ruapuna Speedway	Mark Thorpe	Graham Hartshorne	Mark Jamieson
1997	Stratford Speedway	Chris Penny	Robert Price	Graham Hartshorne
1998	Meeanee Speedway	Paul Atkins	Mark Jamieson	Michael Long
1999	Ruapuna Speedway	Mark Jamieson	Andy Walker	David Bargh
2000	Awapuni Speedway	David Bargh	Kris Jemmet	Sean Cox
2001	Ruapuna Speedway	Graham Hartshorne	Daniel McKinlay	Scott Boyce
2002	Kihikihi Speedway	Andrew Appleton ( (England) )	Nathan Murray	Graham Hartshorne
2003	Ruapuna Speedway	Sam Taylor	Blair McKinlay	John Tuffley
2004	Te Marua Speedway	Jason Bunyan ( (England) )	Simone Terenzani ( (Italy) )	Craig Ramsay
2005	Awapuni Speedway	Jason Bunyan ( (England) )	Glen Phillips ( (England) )	Attila Stefani ( (Hungary) )
2006	Rosebank Speedway	Jason Bunyan ( (England) )	Mattia Carpanese ( (Italy) )	Daniele Tessari ( (Italy) )
2007	Ruapuna Speedway	Andrew Bargh	Dale Finch	Jason Bunyan ( (England) )
2008	Oreti Park Speedway	Jason Bunyan ( (England) )	Larry Ross	Andrew Bargh
2009	Arena Manawatu	Jason Bunyan ( (England) )	Jade Mudgway	Larry Ross
2010	Oreti Park Speedway	Jason Bunyan ( (England) )	Grant Tregoning	Larry Ross
2011	Rosebank Speedway	Grant Tregoning	Jason Bunyan ( (England) )	Ritchie Hawkins ( (England) )
2012	Moore Park Speedway	Jason Bunyan ( (England) )	Grant Tregoning	Dale Finch
2013	Rosebank Speedway	Jason Bunyan ( (England) )	Dale Finch	Sean Mason
2014	Oreti Park Speedway	Jason Bunyan ( (England) )	Grant Tregoning	Sean Mason
2015	Moore Park Speedway	James Sarjeant ( (England) )	Hayden Sims	Dale Finch
2016	Rosebank Speedway	Jason Bunyan ( (England) )	Bradley Wilson-Dean	Sean Mason
2017	Oreti Park Speedway	Bradley Wilson-Dean	Grant Tregoning	Dale Finch
2018	Moore Park Speedway	Bradley Wilson-Dean	Andrew Aldridge	Ryan Terry-Daley
2019	Rosebank Speedway	Bradley Wilson-Dean	Dylan Hancock	Ryan Terry-Daley
2020	Oreti Park Speedway	Bradley Wilson-Dean	Andrew Aldridge	Ryan Terry-Daley
2021	Moore Park Speedway	Ben Whalley	Andrew Aldridge	George Congreve
	2022 not held			
2023	Oreti Park Speedway	George Congreve	Ben Whalley	Finn Reed
2024	Oreti Park Speedway	Bradley Wilson-Dean	George Congreve	Ben Whalley
2025	Moore Park Speedway	Ben Whalley	George Congreve	Hayden Brookland
2026	Oreti Park Speedway	George Congreve	Ryan Colvin	Finn Reed

== See also ==
- New Zealand national speedway team
- Sport in New Zealand
