= Mitch Shirra =

New Zealand speedway rider

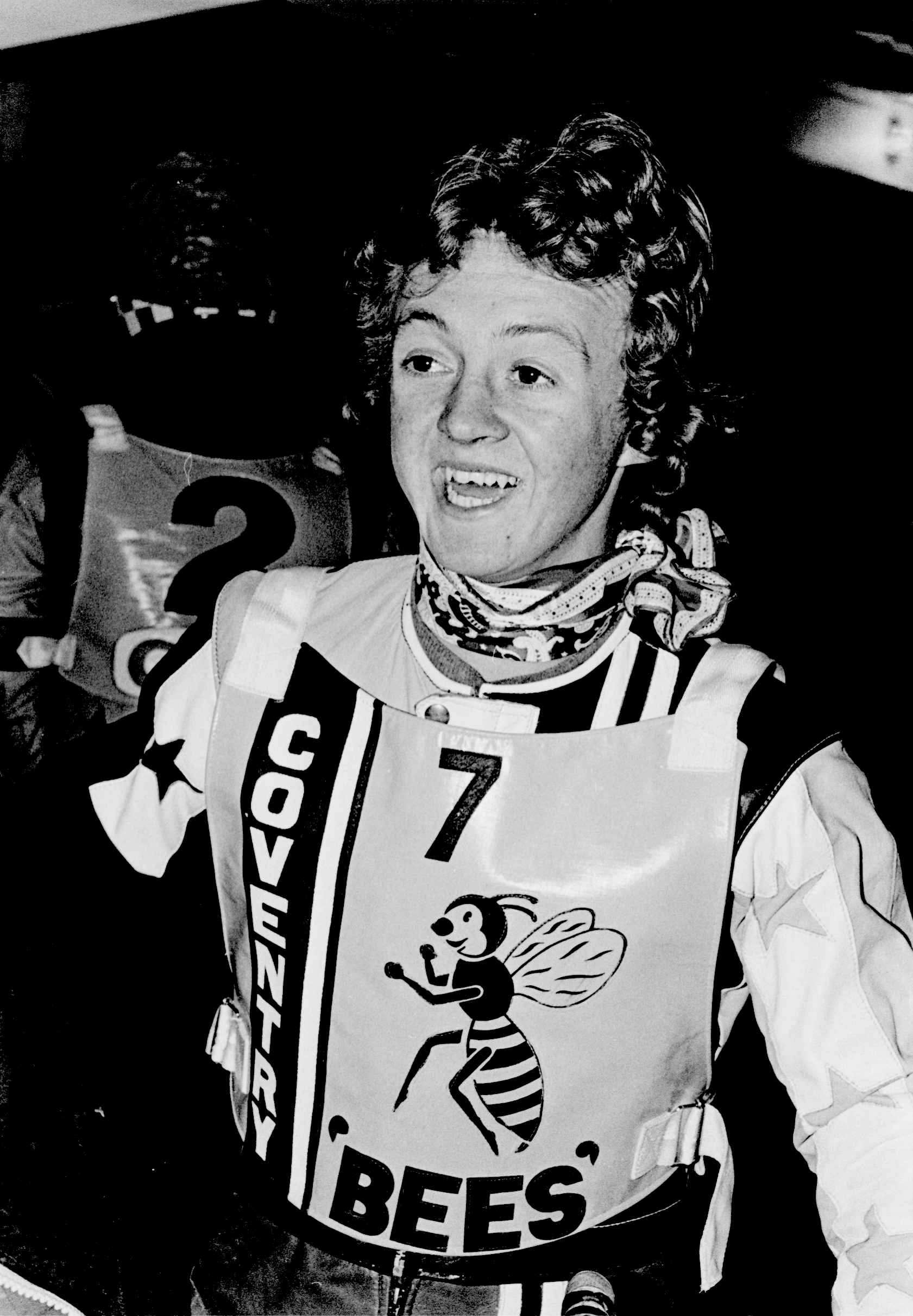
- Born: 27 September 1959 (age 67); Auckland, New Zealand
- Nationality: New Zealander

Career history
- 1975-1982: Coventry Bees
- 1975: Coatbridge Tigers
- 1983-1986, 1988-1989, 1991: Reading Racers
- 1987, 1992: Swindon Robins
- 1993-1994: Ipswich Witches

Individual honours
- 1978: Australasian Champion
- 1980: Brandonapolis
- 1981: Olympique
- 1982, 1983, 1984: New Zealand Champion
- 1984: Scottish Open Champion
- 1984: Blue Riband
- 1987: Overseas Champion
- 1991: New Zealand Long Track GP
- 1991: Australian Long Track GP

Team honours
- 1979: World Team Cup
- 1978, 1979: British League Champion
- 1978: British League Pairs Champion
- 1976, 1977, 1978, 1979, 1981, 1982: Midland Cup
- 1980: Midland League
- 1981: British League Cup

Mitchell Owen Shirra (born 27 September 1958 in Auckland) is a New Zealand former motorcycle speedway rider who rode with the Coventry Bees, Reading Racers, Swindon Robins and Ipswich Witches in the British League. During his career, he rode as and was better known as Mitch Shirra. He earned 17 caps for the New Zealand national speedway team.

== Career ==
Shirra began riding at the Kembla Grange Speedway in New South Wales in 1973 at the age of 14 (he lied about his age in order to race as riders had to be at least 16 years old), although he would consider the Liverpool Speedway in Sydney as his home track. Early in his career this actually led him to ride as an Australian rider, though by the late 1970s when his true age and nationality was revealed he would be considered a New Zealand rider.

In 1975, Shirra joined the Coventry Bees and was loaned out to the Coatbridge Tigers for a year. From 1976 to 1982, he rode for Coventry then transferred to the Reading Racers. In 1987, he was loaned out to the Swindon Robins but returned to Reading in 1988–1989. In 1990 he was banned from the British League for a season for bringing the sport into disrepute after failing two drug tests. Controversy about the decision soon followed and the ban was lifted by the speedway control board. After three months, Shirra returned to racing for the remainder of the 1990 season. He returned to race for Reading in 1991, Swindon in 1992, the Ipswich Witches in 1993 and 1994 he was awarded best club rider that season.

In February 1978, Shirra won his first championship meeting when he took out the Australasian Championship at the Western Springs Speedway in Auckland.

Shirra won the British League Pairs Championship in 1978 with Ole Olsen. That same year, Coventry Bees won the British league title with Shirra riding at number 3.

In 1979, Shirra was a member of the New Zealand team with Larry Ross, Bruce Cribb, Roger Abel and Ivan Mauger which won the World Team Cup at the White City Stadium in London.

Shirra won the Brandonapolis at Coventry in 1980, and won the Dutch Golden Helmet at Veenoord in 1982. He was also on the rostrum at the Golden Helmet of Pardubice where he finished in 3rd place. Shirra left Coventry to join Reading Racers for the 1983 season.

Shirra competed in his first individual World Final in 1983 at the Motodrom Halbemond in Norden, West Germany where he finished in 11th place having scored seven points. He was again a World Finalist in 1984 at the Ullevi Stadium in Gothenburg, Sweden where he scored ten points for a career best fifth place. He would go on to ride in another five World Finals during his career (1986, 1987, 1989, 1991 and 1992). He was sixth at the Munich Olympic Stadium in 1989.

In 1984, Shirra finished third in the World Pairs Championship with Ivan Mauger in Lonigo, Italy. Devastation soon followed his success towards the end of 1984. During an open meeting at Western Springs in Auckland, Shirra sustained a shattered pelvis and femur along with internal injuries. It was feared he would not return to racing but after a lengthy recovery he did return, and continued to have much success and countless podium finishes at a British/European and international level. One of his biggest wins would come when he won the Overseas Final at the Odsal Stadium in Bradford in 1987. In 1988, he controversially was seeded through to the Commonwealth final by the New Zealand ACU, despite failing to qualify from the New Zealand round of the world championship.

In 1990, Shirra was named as the team manager for the World All-Stars team who took on England in a three match Sidecar speedway series ran in England. The World team consisted mostly of those from his native New Zealand as well as Australia.

In 1992, Shirra finished second in the Long Track World Championship, finishing only one point behind Switzerland's Marcel Gerhard. During 1991/92, Shirra to date is the only rider to win all three race meetings at the Australasian Long track series (Albion Park Paceway in Brisbane, the Bathurst Showgrounds and the Addington Raceway in Christchurch).

Shirra is also a three-time New Zealand Champion, having won the title in 1982 (Western Springs), 1983 (Ruapuna Speedway), and 1984 (Penlee Speedway). He finished runner-up in the NZ Championship in 1979, 1981 and 1987, while finishing third in 1986.

== World final appearances ==
=== Individual World Championship ===
- 1983 - (Germany) Norden, Motodrom Halbemond - 11th - 7pts
- 1984 - (Sweden) Gothenburg, Ullevi - 5th - 10pts
- 1986 - (Poland) Chorzów, Silesian Stadium - 16th - 1pt
- 1987 - (Netherlands) Amsterdam, Olympic Stadium - 9th - 12pts
- 1989 - (Germany) Munich, Olympic Stadium - 6th - 10pts
- 1991 - (Sweden) Gothenburg, Ullevi - 13th - 4pts
- 1992 - (Poland) Wrocław, Olympic Stadium - 13th - 6pts

=== World Pairs Championship ===
- 1982 - (Australia) Sydney, Liverpool City Raceway (with Larry Ross*) - 6th - 13pt (8)
- 1984 - (Italy) Lonigo, Pista Speedway (with Ivan Mauger) - 3rd - 25pt (16)
- 1985 - (Poland) Rybnik, Rybnik Municipal Stadium (with Ivan Mauger) - 4th - 15pt (7)
- 1986 - (West Germany) Pocking, Rottalstadion (with Larry Ross) - 5th - 32pt (12)
- 1987 - (Czech Republic) Pardubice, Svítkov Stadion (with David Bargh) - 4th - 36pt (16)
- 1988 - (England) Bradford, Odsal Stadium (with Alan Rivett**) - 4th - 32pt (24)
- 1992 - (Italy) Lonigo, Pista Speedway (with David Bargh, Mark Thorpe) - 6th - 14pt (12)

* Australian rider and meeting reserve Phil Herne rode one race as Larry Ross had bike trouble
** Australian rider Alan Rivett replaced the injured David Bargh

=== World Team Cup ===
- 1979 - (England) London, White City Stadium (with Ivan Mauger / Larry Ross / Bruce Cribb / Roger Abel) - Winner - 35pts (10)

=== Long track World Championship ===
- 1991 - CZE Mariánské Lázně - 5th
- 1992 - GER Pfarrkirchen - 2nd
- 1993 - GER Mühldorf - 8th
