= Kihikihi =

Town in Waikato, New Zealand

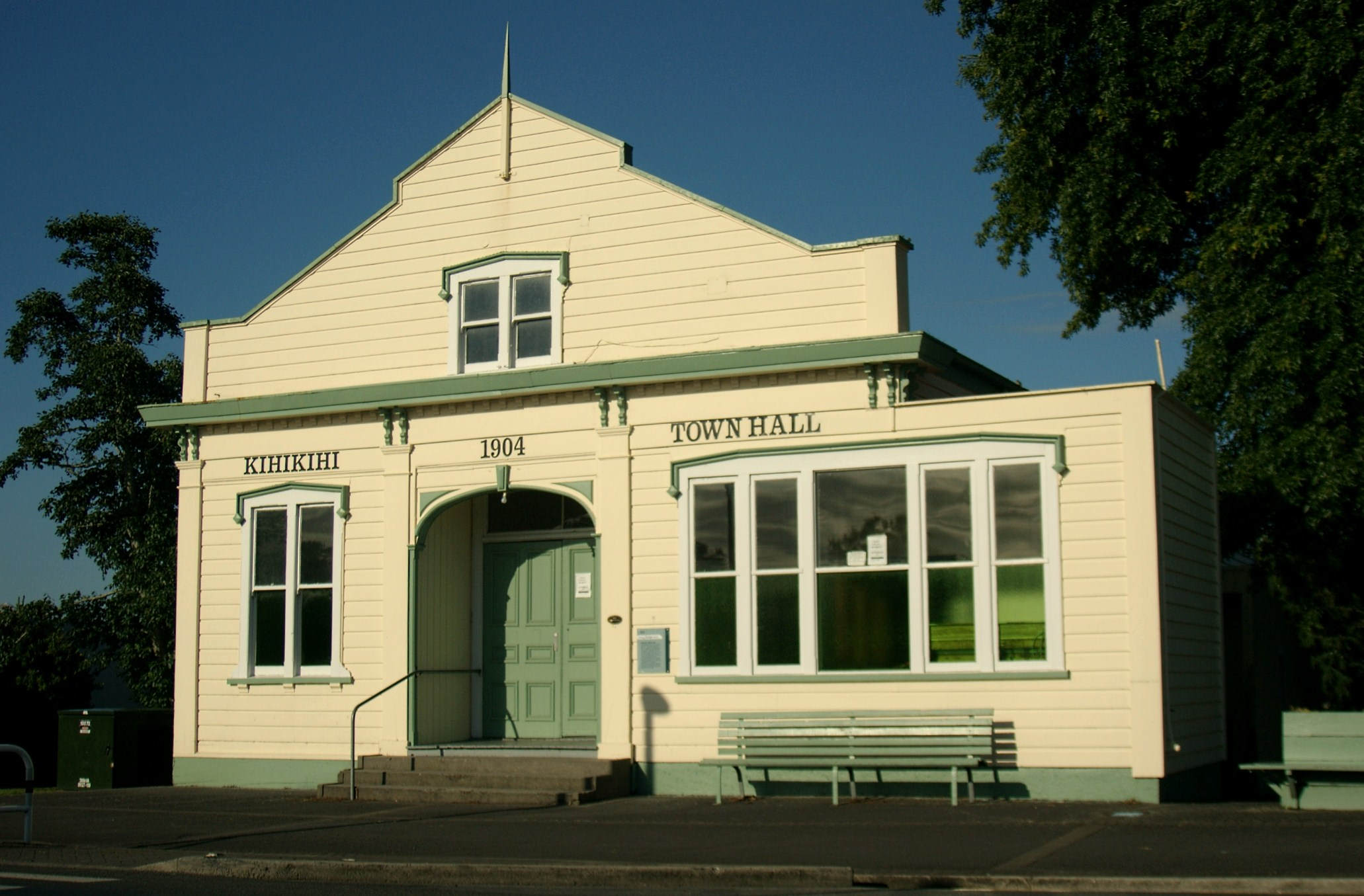
- Kihikihi Town Hall (c. 1904)
- Interactive map of Kihikihi
- Coordinates: 38°2′S 175°21′E
- Country: New Zealand
- Region: Waikato
- District: Waipā District
- Ward: Te Awamutu General Ward
- Community: Te Awamutu Community
- Electorates: Taranaki-King Country; Hauraki-Waikato (Māori)

Government
  - Territorial Authority: Waipā District Council
  - Regional council: Waikato Regional Council
  - Mayor of Waipa: Mike Pettit
  - Taranaki-King Country MP: Barbara Kuriger
  - Hauraki-Waikato MP: Hana-Rawhiti Maipi-Clarke

Area
  - Total: 8.80 km^{2} (3.40 sq mi)

Population (June 2025)
  - Total: 3,820
  - Density: 434/km^{2} (1,120/sq mi)

Kihikihi, a small town located in the Waikato region of the North Island of New Zealand, serves as a satellite community of Te Awamutu, five kilometres to the north, and lies 35 kilometres south of Hamilton. The estimated population was 3,820 as of June 2025.

Kihikihi is a Māori-language word meaning "cicada"; the name imitates the sound made by the insect.

== History ==
Kihikihi in the 19th century was described as a "border settlement" or a "frontier town" by James Cowan, ruined in the 1880s by the "Great Wet Peace" with the partition of the King Country and land-buying from Māori.

== Demographics ==
Kihikihi covers 8.80 km^{2} (3.40 sq mi) and had an estimated population of 3,820 as of June 2025, with a population density of 434 people per km^{2}.

Historical population
Year	Pop.	±% p.a.
2006	2,361	—
2013	2,409	+0.29%
2018	2,754	+2.71%
2023	3,456	+4.65%
The 2006 population is for a larger area of 10.09 km^{2}. Source:

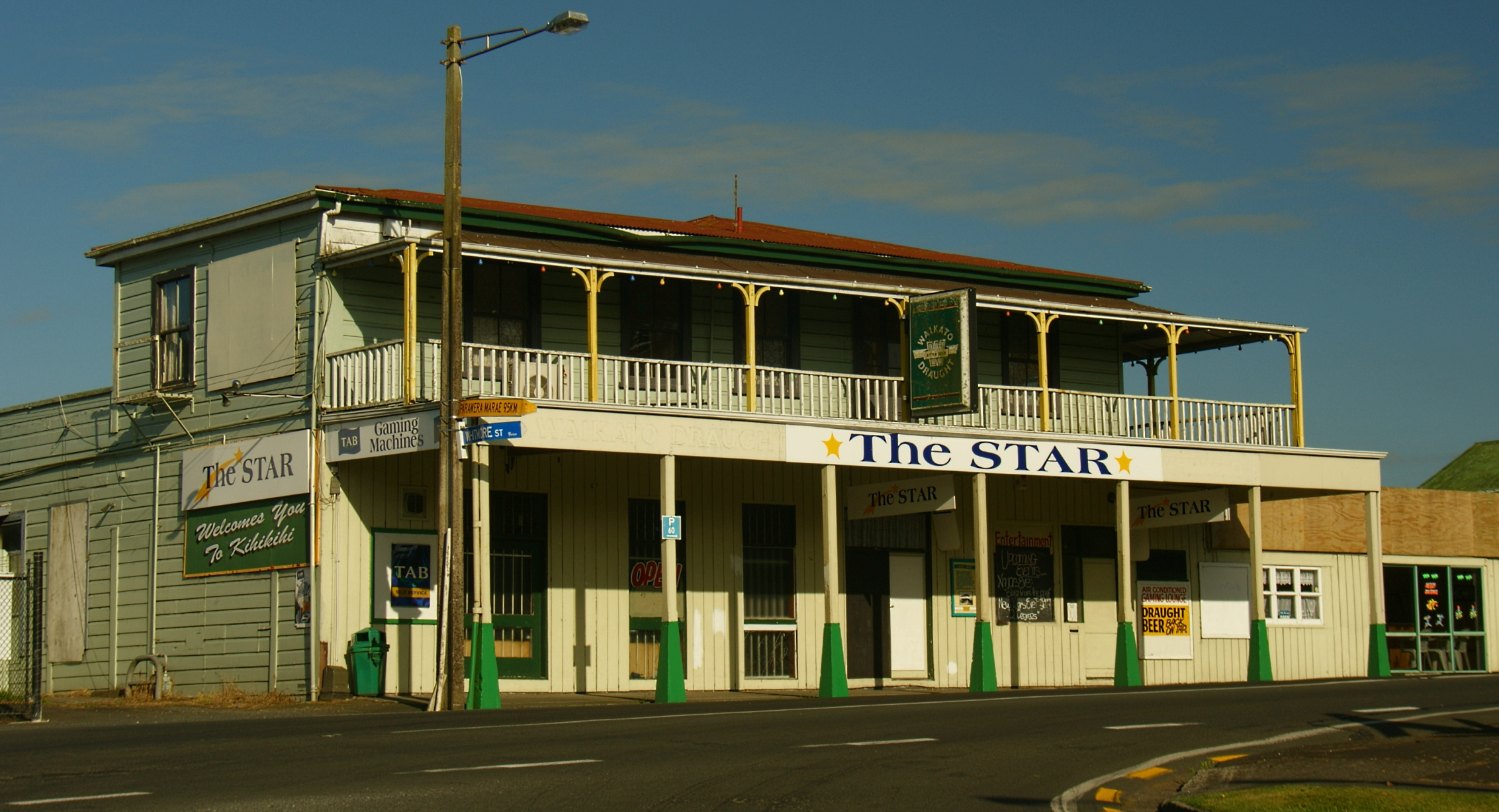
Kihikihi Star Hotel (c.1883)

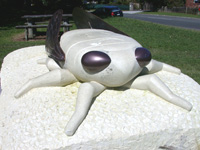
The Kihikihi cicada statue

Kihikihi had a population of 3,456 in the 2023 New Zealand census, an increase of 702 people (25.5%) since the 2018 census, and an increase of 1,047 people (43.5%) since the 2013 census. There were 1,698 males, 1,749 females, and 9 people of other genders in 1,212 dwellings. 2.9% of people identified as LGBTIQ+. The median age was 34.2 years (compared with 38.1 years nationally). There were 777 people (22.5%) aged under 15 years, 690 (20.0%) aged 15 to 29, 1,494 (43.2%) aged 30 to 64, and 498 (14.4%) aged 65 or older.

People could identify as more than one ethnicity. The results were 79.3% European (Pākehā); 30.1% Māori; 3.6% Pasifika; 5.2% Asian; 0.5% Middle Eastern, Latin American and African New Zealanders (MELAA); and 2.0% other, which includes people giving their ethnicity as "New Zealander". English was spoken by 95.8%, Māori by 6.9%, Samoan by 0.3%, and other languages by 6.9%. No language could be spoken by 2.9% (e.g. too young to talk). New Zealand Sign Language was known by 0.5%. The percentage of people born overseas was 15.4, compared with 28.8% nationally.

Religious affiliations were 26.2% Christian, 1.5% Hindu, 0.1% Islam, 2.1% Māori religious beliefs, 0.7% Buddhist, 0.5% New Age, 0.1% Jewish, and 1.1% other religions. People who answered that they had no religion were 60.4%, and 7.4% of people did not answer the census question.

Of those at least 15 years old, 462 (17.2%) people had a bachelor's or higher degree, 1,554 (58.0%) had a post-high school certificate or diploma, and 666 (24.9%) people exclusively held high school qualifications. The median income was $45,600, compared with $41,500 nationally. 243 people (9.1%) earned over $100,000 compared to 12.1% nationally. The employment status of those at least 15 was 1,533 (57.2%) full-time, 321 (12.0%) part-time, and 66 (2.5%) unemployed.

Individual statistical areas
Name	Area (km^{2})	Population	Density (per km^{2})	Dwellings	Median age	Median income
St Leger	6.56	624	95	222	40.8 years	$55,200
Kihikihi Central	2.24	2,829	1,263	990	33.2 years	$43,900
New Zealand					38.1 years	$41,500

== People ==
John Rochford (1832–1893), a railroad surveyor, died in the Star Hotel and is buried in the Kihikihi Cemetery.

Rewi Maniapoto (1807–1894), a Māori chief, lived in Kihikihi.

== Archaeological sites ==
20 archaeological sites have been identified in the town, 9 of which are listed by Heritage New Zealand -

- c1868 Alpha Hotel
- 1879 Major Jackson's House
- 1881 Christ Church (Anglican)
- 1883 Star Hotel
- 1894 Rewi Maniapoto Memorial and Reserve
- 1904 Town Hall
- 1907 Constable's House and Police Station
- 1920 World War One Memorial
- 94 Lyon St

Under the Reserves Act 1977, a management plan for some of the historic area was drawn up for Waipā District Council.

== Education ==
Kihikihi School is a co-educational state primary school for Year 1 to 8 students, with a roll of 161 as of July 2026 Kihikihi is a dual medium Kura, meaning there is an Aoraki stream taught in English, and a Rumaki stream taught entirely in Te Reo Māori. It opened in 1873, and moved to its current site in 1884. It was destroyed by fire in 1938, and rebuilt in 1952.

== Transport ==
Kihikihi is on SH3. An infrequent bus service operated by GoBus links it to Te Awamutu and Hamilton. The Kihikihi Trail cycleway to Te Awamutu opened in 2017.

== Sport ==
Kihikihi Speedway is a motorcycle speedway venue located on Grey Street. The track races various types of cars, such as stock cars, superstocks, midgets, sprint cars, sidecars and saloons, in addition to motorcycle speedway. and has been a significant venue for important motorcycle speedway events, including qualifying rounds of the Speedway World Championship and finals of the New Zealand Solo Championship.
