= New Zealand national speedway team =

New Zealand national motorcycle speedway team

New Zealand

World Championships
Team (SWC)	1979
Pairs	1969, 1970

The New Zealand national speedway team are one of the teams in international motorcycle speedway. The team were champions of the world having won the sports premier team competition in 1979.

== History ==
The New Zealand team competed in the inaugural Speedway World Team Cup in 1960 and the following World Cup in 1961. However, in 1962 their leading riders rode for the British team. This format continued until 1974, when New Zealand reverted to the competing as their own nation. The team were arguably denied the opportunity of winning the World Cup, because they had two of the all-time greats in Ivan Mauger and Barry Briggs within their ranks. New Zealand riders were part of the British teams that won the World Cup in 1968, 1971 and 1972.

The team became the world champions after winning the 1979 Speedway World Team Cup at White City, with a team consisting of Ivan Mauger, Larry Ross, Mitch Shirra, Bruce Cribb and reserve Roger Abel.

Despite the World Cup success, the team began to experience a decline in the number and quality of riders from New Zealand and this led to the team failing to field a team in various years of the Speedway World Team Cup. The situation did not improve for the rebranded Speedway World Cup in 2001 or the Speedway of Nations introduced in 2018.

Additionally, they won the defunct Speedway World Pairs Championship twice, in 1969 and 1970.

== Major tournament wins ==
=== World Team Championship ===
Year	Venue	Standings (Pts)	Riders	Pts
1979	(England); London; White City Stadium	1. New Zealand (35); 2. Denmark (31); 3. Czechoslovakia (19); 4. Poland (11)	Larry Ross	11
1979	(England); London; White City Stadium	1. New Zealand (35); 2. Denmark (31); 3. Czechoslovakia (19); 4. Poland (11)	Mitch Shirra	10
1979	(England); London; White City Stadium	1. New Zealand (35); 2. Denmark (31); 3. Czechoslovakia (19); 4. Poland (11)	Ivan Mauger	13
1979	(England); London; White City Stadium	1. New Zealand (35); 2. Denmark (31); 3. Czechoslovakia (19); 4. Poland (11)	Bruce Cribb	5

=== World Pairs Championship ===
Year	Venue	Standings (Pts)	Riders	Pts
1969	(Sweden); Stockholm; Gubbängens IP	1. New Zealand (28); 2. Sweden (27); 3. England (21); 4. Denmark (15); 5. Czechoslovakia (12); 6. East Germany (9); 7. Bulgaria (9)	Ivan Mauger	18
1969	(Sweden); Stockholm; Gubbängens IP	1. New Zealand (28); 2. Sweden (27); 3. England (21); 4. Denmark (15); 5. Czechoslovakia (12); 6. East Germany (9); 7. Bulgaria (9)	Bob Andrews	10
1970	(Sweden); Malmö; Malmö Stadion	1. New Zealand (28); 2. Sweden (25); 3. England (19); 4. Scotland (18); 5. Czechoslovakia (11); 6. (Socialist Federal Republic of Yugoslavia) Yugoslavia (7); 7. Denmark (nc)	Ronnie Moore	16
1970	(Sweden); Malmö; Malmö Stadion	1. New Zealand (28); 2. Sweden (25); 3. England (19); 4. Scotland (18); 5. Czechoslovakia (11); 6. (Socialist Federal Republic of Yugoslavia) Yugoslavia (7); 7. Denmark (nc)	Ivan Mauger	12

== International caps (as of 2022) ==
Since the advent of the Speedway Grand Prix era, international caps earned by riders is largely restricted to international competitions, whereas previously test matches between two teams were a regular occurrence. This means that the number of caps earned by a rider has decreased in the modern era.

Rider	Caps
Abel, Roger	1
Adlington, Robin	8
Allan, Gary	2
Allan, Goog	2
Anderson, Cliff	1
Anderson, Bob	2
Andrew, Bill	15
Andrews, Bob	27
Bargh, Dave	8
Black, Tom	1
Bock, Kevin	1
Boyle, Frank	4
Briggs, Barry	49
Briggs, Tony	4
Briggs, Wayne	5
Brown, Allan	6
Max Brown	1
Brown, Wayne	3
Campbell, Dick	6
Church, Paul	2
Clark, Peter	12
Clements, Brian	2
Coombes, Graham	1
Cribb, Bruce	22
Duckworth, Bob	8
Dunn, Maury	16
Dykes, Peter	5
Farquharson, Colin	4
Gifford, Dave	19
Goodall, John	7
Holland, Mick	3
Johnston, Ron	16
Lawrie, John	1
McKee, Colin	5
McKeown, Brian	3
Mardon, Geoff	10
Martin, Chris	2
Mason, Alan	4
Mauger, Ivan	43
Mauger, Kym	5
Millen, Jack	2
Moore, Ronnie	50
Neil, Merv	15
New, Charlie	2
Ovenden, Bruce	1
Peterson, Gary	21
Redmond, Trevor	17
Rivett, Alan	1
Ross, Larry	26
Shearer, Terry	2
Shirra, Mitch	17
Shuter, Frank	14
Smith, Graeme	2
Stapleton, Graeme	20
Subritzky, Bryce	28
Sweetman, Tommy*	1
Thorpe, Mark	2
Timmo, Rick	19
Tucker, Colin	2
Whitaker, Dave	4
Wright, Roger	8

Riders marked with an asterisk represented New Zealand but were not New Zealanders.

== See also ==
- New Zealand Solo Championship
