= Andrew Bargh =

New Zealand speedway rider

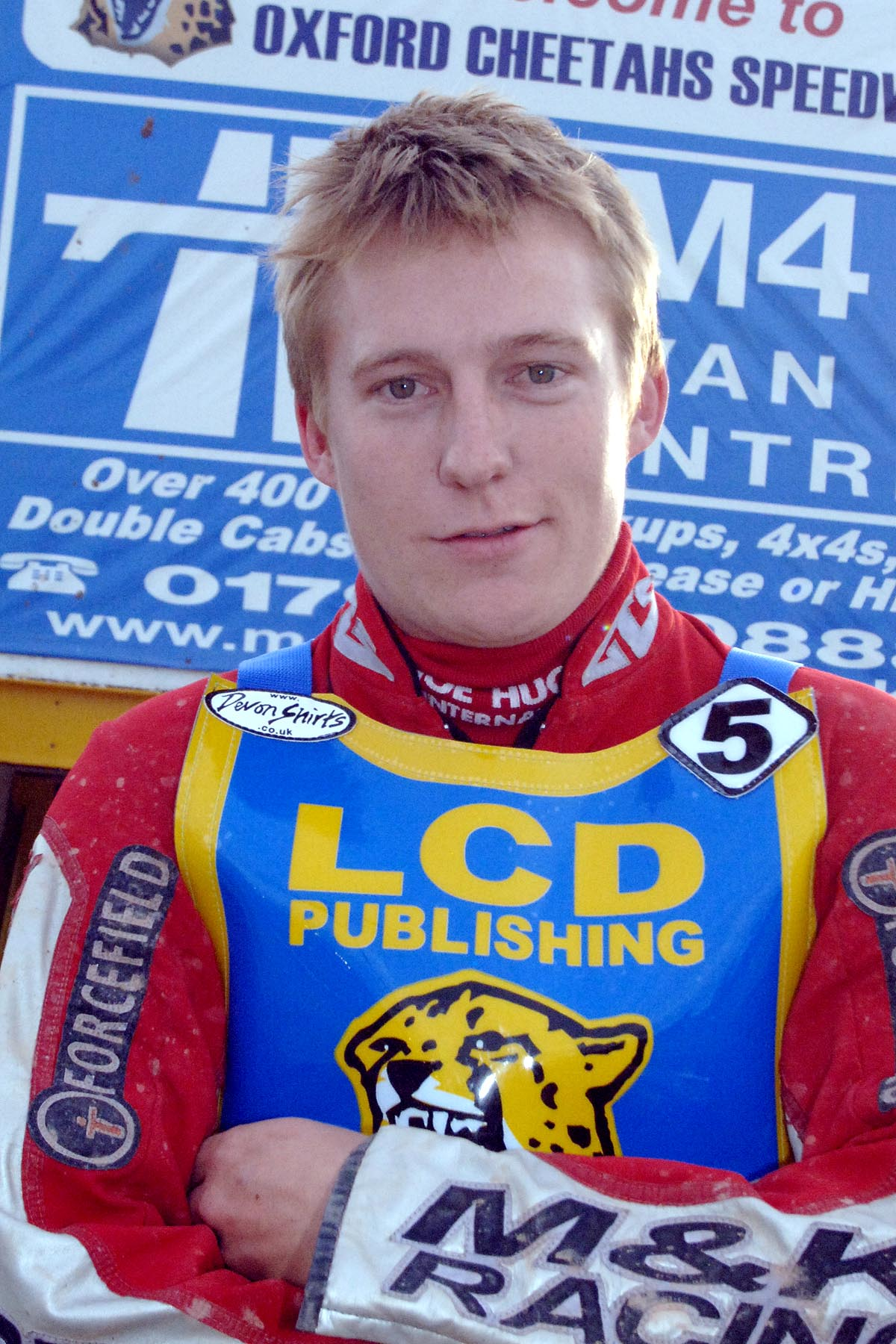
- Born: 15 April 1986 (age 40); Napier, New Zealand
- Nationality: New Zealander

Career history
- 2005: Wimbledon Dons
- 2005: Mildenhall Fen Tigers
- 2006-2008: Isle of Wight Islanders
- 2007: Oxford Lions

Individual honours
- 2007: New Zealand Champion
- 2005: New Zealand U21 champion

Andrew Lawrence Bargh (born 15 April 1986) is a New Zealand former motorcycle speedway rider. He is a former national champion of New Zealand.

== Speedway career ==
Bargh started his British leagues career in 2005 after doubling up with the Wimbledon Dons and the Mildenhall Fen Tigers for the 2005 Speedway Conference League. In 2005, he also became the New Zealand Under 21 champion. The following season in 2006, he rode for the Mildenhall Academy before joining the Isle of Wight Islanders in the Premier League for the 2007 season. He would also ride for Oxford Lions during their ill-fated 2007 campaign.

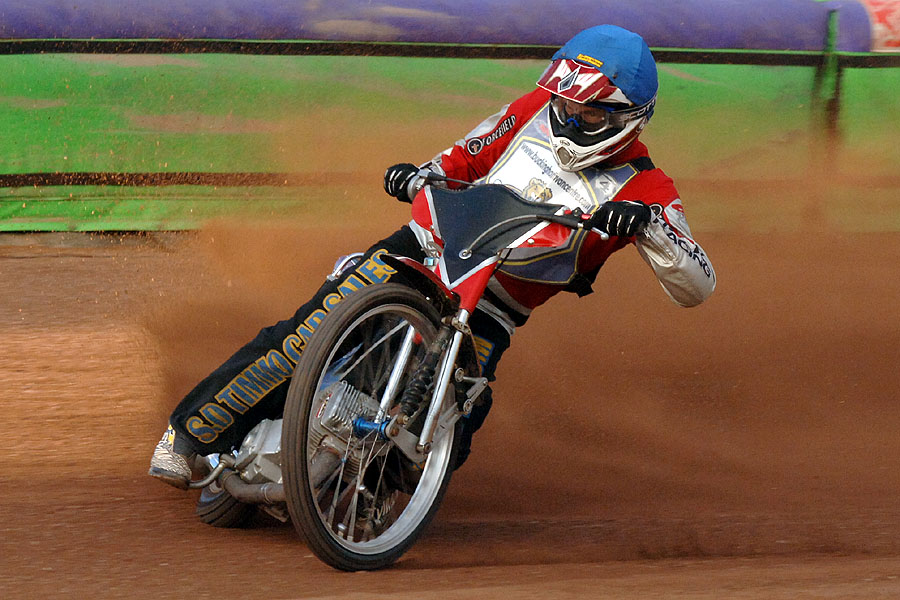
Bargh riding for Oxford in 2007

Bargh became champion of New Zealand, winning the New Zealand Championship in 2007.

Bargh's final season was with the Isle of Wight during the 2008 Premier League speedway season. He finished third in the 2008 New Zealand Championship when attempting to retain his title.

== Family ==
Bargh's uncle David was a four-time New Zealand speedway champion.
