= Bruce Abernethy (speedway rider) =

New Zealand speedway rider (1926–1999)

- Born: 14 May 1926; Wellington, New Zealand
- Died: 2 April 1999 (aged 72); New Zealand

Career history

Great Britain
- 1948–1951: Wembley Lions

Individual honours
- 1950, 1951: New Zealand champion

Team honours
- 1949, 1950, 1951: National League (UK)
- 1949, 1950, 1951: London Cup

Bruce Mackenzie Abernethy (14 May 1926 – 2 April 1999) was a motorcycle speedway rider from New Zealand.

== Career ==
Abernethy purchased his first motorcycle in 1946 and competed in beach racing and hill climbs before taking up speedway when the Hutt speedway track in Lower Hutt opened in December 1947. During his first season, he was approached by Wally Kilmister who arranged for him to ride for the Wembley Lions in the 1948 Speedway National League. He was loaned out for most of the year to the Rayleigh Rockets team which competed in some third division challenge matches. From 1949 to 1951, he was included in the Wembley team and helped the team win three consecutive league titles in 1949, 1950 and 1951. He broke the Wembley track record in 1951.

Abernethy won the New Zealand Speedway Championship in 1950 and 1951 and although he didn't ride in the UK after 1951, he continued to compete in New Zealand until 1959.

In 1964 and 1965, Abernethy drove a Cooper Climax in the Tasman Series.
