= Frank Shuter (speedway rider) =

New Zealand speedway rider

- Born: 17 June 1943; Rotorua, New Zealand
- Died: 12 July 1997 (aged 54); California, United States
- Nationality: New Zealander

Career history

Great Britain
- 1965-1968: Swindon Robins
- 1969-1970, 1972: Poole Pirates
- 1973-1974: Exeter Falcons

United States
- 1976: LA Sprockets

Individual honours
- 1971: New Zealand Champion

Team honours
- 1967, 1969, 1974: British League Champion
- 1967, 1968: Midland Cup Winner

Franklin John Shuter (17 June 1943 – 12 July 1997) was a New Zealand motorcycle speedway rider. He rode with, and was League champion with each of the Swindon Robins, the Poole Pirates and the Exeter Falcons in the British League. He earned 14 caps for the New Zealand national speedway team.

== Biography ==
Shuter was born in Rotorua but spent most of his early life in Christchurch after his parents moved there in 1952. His father Frank, was one of the South Island's leading motor racing drivers. In the early 1960s Shuter drove his father's cars in races at Tahuna Beach, Ruapuna and Wigram. He also competed in motocross events.

Shuter began riding speedway at the Templeton Speedway in Christchurch in 1963. He moved to England in 1965 and joined the Swindon Robins. In 1969 he was transferred to the Poole Pirates. In late 1970 he returned to New Zealand and had a break from speedway for a year. Shuter won the New Zealand Championship in 1971. He returned to England in 1972 and rode for Poole again. The following year, he was transferred to the Exeter Falcons. When Exeter won the League Championship in 1974, he became the first rider to win three league medals with different clubs. He retired from riding in the British League at the end of 1974 and moved to Israel. While living there he rode for a Rest of the World team v. U.S.A. in March 1976. He then moved to California to ride for the LA Sprockets in the American League. He was injured in a track accident and retired from speedway in May 1976.

== Personal life ==
In the late 1970s, Shuter lived Los Angeles. He established an engineering machining business called All Right Machining in Los Angeles which worked on engines and transmissions for aircraft companies. He later moved the business to Hemet, and in 1996, he sold it to the Stillen Company. He died in a traffic accident on 12 July 1997.
