= Tom Black (speedway rider) =

New Zealand speedway rider

- Born: 11 July 1941 (age 85); Christchurch, New Zealand
- Nationality: New Zealander

Career history
- 1973, 1974: Teesside Tigers
- 1974: Leicester Lions

Thomas John Black (born 11 July 1941) is a former motorcycle speedway rider from New Zealand. He earned one cap for the New Zealand national speedway team.

== Career ==
Black began racing in the mid-1960s, and he won the South Island Championship in 1969 and 1970. He rode in the third Test of 1969/70 against England at Christchurch and also rode for New Zealand against Sweden in 1972.

In 1973, Black travelled to England where he rode for Teesside Tigers, but only rode in seven meetings before his season was ended by a broken collarbone and arm. After regaining his fitness in the 1973/74 New Zealand season, he returned to the United Kingdom in 1974 to ride for Leicester Lions. Disappointing results for Leicester saw him return to Teesside, but in his first match back for the team he suffered a broken ankle, ending his British league career. He continued to ride in New Zealand for several years before retiring.
