= Bradley Wilson-Dean =

New Zealand speedway rider

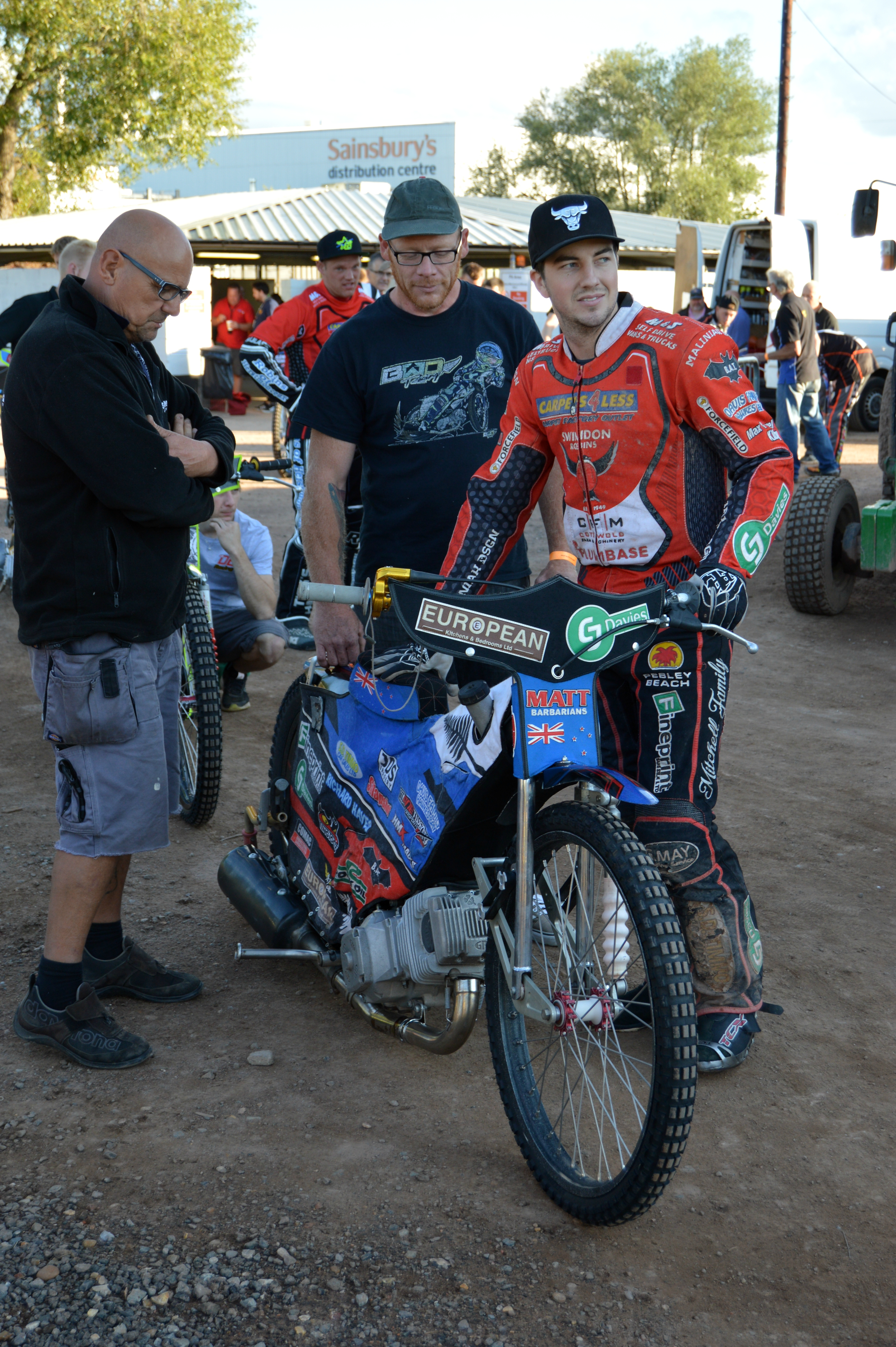
- Bradley Wilson-Dean at Rye House, 2017
- Born: 26 October 1994 (age 32); Hastings, New Zealand
- Nationality: New Zealander

Career history
- 2015: Eastbourne Eagles
- 2016, 2018: Somerset Rebels
- 2017-2019: Peterborough Panthers
- 2017: Swindon Robins
- 2019: Workington Comets
- 2022: Newcastle Diamonds

Individual honours
- 2017, 2018, 2019, 2020, 2024: New Zealand Champion
- 2014, 2015: New Zealand U21 Champion
- 2023: US Open Speedway Champion

Team honours
- 2018: SGB Championship Fours

Bradley Wilson-Dean (born 26 October 1994) is a New Zealand motorcycle speedway rider. He is a five-time champion of New Zealand.

== Career ==
Wilson-Dean began riding speedway at the age of 12 in New Zealand and progressed to riding 500cc machines in 2011 when he was 15. The same year, he rode in The FIM Speedway Youth Gold Trophy in Norrköping where he placed fourth.

In 2015, Wilson-Dean joined the Eastbourne Eagles in the National League, where he achieved a 9.83 average for the season and was the team's top scorer. The following year, Wilson-Dean rode for the Somerset Rebels in the Premier League of British Speedway and in 2017, he rode in the SGB Premiership for the Swindon Robins. In 2018, he rode for the Somerset team in the Premiership.

In 2017 and 2018, Wilson-Dean also rode in the SGB Championship for the Peterborough Panthers, and he stayed with them in 2019 when the Panthers moved up to the Premiership. He was part of the Peterborough team that won the SGB Championship Fours, which was held on 1 July 2018, at the Media Prime Arena. He had also signed to ride for the Workington Comets in the SGB Championship 2019 but the club folded before the season began. He was injured midway during the season and returned to New Zealand to recuperate.

In 2020, Wilson-Dean signed for the Somerset Rebels and the Peterborough Panthers but had to withdraw before the season began due to injury. In 2022, he joined the Newcastle Diamonds but only rode in three meetings before being sidelined with injury. He had also signed for the second league Polish team, Kolejarz Rawicz but did not ride in any meetings.

In 2021, Wilson-Dean won his fourth successive New Zealand Solo Championship. In September 2023, he won the US Open Speedway Championship at the Champion Speedway in New York.

In 2024, Wilson-Dean won his fifth New Zealand title.
