= Bob Andrews (speedway rider) =

British-New Zealand speedway rider (1935–2026)

- Born: 27 October 1935; Edmonton, London, England
- Died: 17 May 2026 (aged 90); Auckland, New Zealand
- Nationality: British (English) / New Zealander

Career history
- 1954–1955: California Poppies
- 1956–1964: Wimbledon Dons
- 1965: Wolverhampton Wolves
- 1968–1969 1971–1972: Cradley Heathens
- 1970: Hackney Hawks

Individual honours
- 1960, 1961, 1962, 1964: Speedway World Championship finalist
- 1966: New Zealand Champion

Team honours
- 1969: World Pairs Champion
- 1956, 1958, 1959, 1960, 1961: National League Champion
- 1956, 1959, 1960, 1962: National Trophy winner
- 1954: Southern Area League Champion
- 1959: Britannia Shield

Robert Thomas Andrews (27 October 1935 – 17 May 2026) was an international motorcycle speedway rider from England and New Zealand. Andrews was capped by England 21 times, Great Britain 12 times and later was capped 27 times for the New Zealand national speedway team.

== Speedway career ==
Andrews was a leading rider in the 1960s and reached the final of the Speedway World Championship on four occasions in 1960, 1961, 1962 and 1964.

Andrews rode in the top tier of British Speedway from 1956–1970, riding for California Poppies, Wimbledon Dons, Wolverhampton Wolves, Cradley Heathens and Hackney Hawks.

Andrews later emigrated to New Zealand and gained international caps for the country and rode the last of his World finals in New Zealand colours.

== Death ==
Andrews died on 17 May 2026 at the age of 90.

== World final appearances ==
=== Individual World Championship ===
- 1960 – (England) London, Wembley Stadium – 17th – 2pts
- 1961 – (Sweden) Malmö, Malmö Stadion – 5th – 10pts
- 1962 – (England) London, Wembley Stadium – 6th – 9pts
- 1964 – (Sweden) Gothenburg, Ullevi – 13th – 4pts

=== World Pairs Championship ===
- 1969* – (Sweden) Stockholm, Gubbängens IP (with Ivan Mauger) – Winner – 28pts (10)

* Unofficial World Championships.

=== World Team Cup ===
- 1961* – (Poland) Wrocław, Olympic Stadium (with Ron How / Peter Craven / Ken McKinlay) – 3rd – 21pts (6)

* 1961 for England.
