= 2026 National Development League speedway season =

Third tier of 2026 British speedway season

- League: National Development League
- NDL Champions: Edinburgh Academy
- Knockout Cup: not held
- Riders' Championship: not held
- Highest average: Jody Scott
- Division/s above: 2026 SGB Premiership; 2026 SGB Championship

The 2026 National Development League was the third division/tier of British motorcycle speedway for the 2026 season. It is a semi-professional development league, containing mainly the junior sides of SGB Premiership and SGB Championship clubs. Oxford Chargers were the defending champions having won the title in 2025.

== Summary ==
Four of six 2025 clubs returned for the 2026 edition. The two other teams were King's Lynn Young Stars, who stepped up from the 2025 NT and the newly named Buxton Bulls (formerly Buxton Hitmen) returned to British speedway. Two teams dropped out, the Belle Vue Colts and the Scunthorpe/Sheffield combination. The league and trophy points limit was set at 42.

Locations of the 2026 National Development League teams

== NDL ==
=== League table ===
Pos.	Club	M	Home			Away			F	A	B	Pts	+/−
Pos.	Club	M	W	D	L	W	D	L	F	A	B	Pts	+/−
1	Edinburgh Academy (C)	10	5	0	0	5	0	0	553	346	5	25	+207
2	Leicester Lions Cubs	10	3	0	2	1	1	3	447	453	2	11	-6
3	King's Lynn Young Stars	10	2	1	2	2	0	3	444	456	2	11	-12
4	Oxford Chargers	10	3	0	2	1	0	4	444	453	2	10	-9
5	Middlesbrough Tigers	10	3	0	2	1	0	4	410	489	2	10	-79
6	Buxton Bulls	10	3	0	2	0	0	5	399	500	2	8	-101

=== Fixtures and results ===
Home \ Away	BUX	EDI	KL	LEI	MID	OXF
Buxton		33–57	51–39	40–50	57–33	51–38
Edinburgh	59–31		55–35	65–25	57–33	51–39
Kings Lynn	49–41	37–53		45–45	56–34	38–52
Leicester	61–29	37–53	40–50		53–37	56–34
Middlesbrough	56–34	36–54	35–55	53–37		45–44
Oxford	58–32	40–49	50–40	47–43	42–48	

Updated to match(es) played on unknown. Source:
Legend: Blue = home team win; Yellow = draw; Red = away team win.

== Leading averages ==
	Rider	Team	Average
1	(England) Jody Scott	Oxford	11.04
2	(Australia) Jordy Loftus	Edinburgh	10.45
3	(England) Simon Lambert	King's Lynn	10.36
4	(England) Freddy Hodder	Leicester	10.13
5	(England) Vinnie Foord	Edinburgh	9.88
6	(England) Nathan Ablitt	Middlesbrough	9.70
7	(England) James Shanes	Edinburgh	9.65
8	(England) Jake Mulford	King's Lynn	9.58
9	(New Zealand) Ben Whalley	Edinburgh	9.54
10	(Australia) Dayle Wood	Edinburgh	9.30

- averages include all league fixtures, min 4 matches

== Squads and final averages ==
Minimum 2 matches

=== Buxton Bulls ===
- (England) Alfie Bowtell 8.57
- (England) Jack Roberts 7.13
- (England) Luke Harris 6.95
- (England) Jack Smith (C) 6.82
- (England) Arran Butcher 5.05
- (England) Jack Shimelt 3.59
- (England) Will Boraston 2.57
- (England) Ryan Ashcroft 0.00

=== Edinburgh Monarchs Academy ===
- (Australia) Jordy Loftus 10.45
- (England) Vinnie Foord 9.88
- (England) James Shanes 9.65
- (New Zealand) Ben Whalley 9.54
- (Australia) Dayle Wood 9.30
- (England) Jamie Halder 7.92
- (Australia) Anika Loftus 1.68

=== King's Lynn Young Stars ===
- (England) Simon Lambert (C) 10.36
- (England) Jake Mulford 9.58
- (England) Dan Gilkes 7.33
- (England) Mickie Simpson 6.84
- (England) Ollie Binns 5.92
- (England) Kyran Lyden 2.93
- (England) Sam Woods 2.29
- (England) Connor King 1.71

=== Leicester Lion Cubs ===
- (England) Freddy Hodder 10.13
- (England) Ryan Ingram 8.43
- (England) Max Perry 8.27
- (England) Ben Morley (C) 7.29
- (England) Tom Spencer 6.86
- (England) Seth Norman 6.32
- (England) Eli Meadows 3.91

=== Middlesbrough Tigers ===
- (England) Nathan Ablitt 9.70
- (Scotland) Ace Pijper 8.95
- (England) Charlie Southwick 6.43
- (New Zealand) Jade Mudgway 6.13
- (England) Alex Spooner 5.19
- (Scotland) Stene Pijper 4.76
- (England) Harry Sadler 4.18
- (England) Kai Ward 2.50

=== Oxford Chargers ===
- (England) Jody Scott (C) 11.04
- (England) Senna Summers 8.64
- (England) Harry Fletcher 7.30
- (England) Darryl Ritchings 7.22
- (England) Ashton Vale 6.67
- (England) Max Broadhurst 1.44
- (England) Mason Watson 1.33

== See also ==
- List of United Kingdom speedway league champions
- Knockout Cup (speedway)
