= Ben Whalley =

New Zealand speedway rider

- Born: 27 January 2003 (age 23); Christchurch, New Zealand

Career history
- 2026: Edinburgh Monarchs Academy
- 2026: Plymouth Gladiators

Individual honours
- 2021, 2025: New Zealand champion
- 2023: New Zealand under-21 champion

Ben Whalley (born 27 January 2003) is a New Zealand speedway rider.

== Career ==
Whalley started riding junior speedway at the Moore Park track in Christchurch in 2013. He progressed to riding a 500cc bike in December 2017. He won the 2020-21 New Zealand Solo Championship at the age of 18 and became the youngest rider ever to win the title. The following season, he won the New Zealand Under 21 championship. In 2024, he moved to Australia to race there. He returned briefly to Christchurch for the 2024-25 New Zealand Solo Championship which he won.

Whalley began his British league career, signing for Edinburgh Monarchs Academy in the 2026 National Development League speedway season, In June, he joined the Plymouth Gladiators in the 2026 SGB Championship.
