= Alf Mattson =

New Zealand speedway rider

- Born: 28 August 1911; Auckland, New Zealand
- Died: 27 May 2001 (aged 89); Auckland, New Zealand
- Nationality: New Zealander

Career history

Great Britain
- 1931: Leicester Stadium
- 1931: Lea Bridge
- 1932–1933: Coventry

Individual honours
- 1930, 1931: New Zealand champion

Alfred William Mattson (28 August 1911 – 27 May 2001) was a motorcycle speedway rider from New Zealand.

== Career ==
In 1930 and 1931, Mattson became twice champion of New Zealand after winning the New Zealand Solo Championship. He was one of the early speedway pioneer riders who travelled to the United Kingdom from New Zealand. He started racing in the British leagues during the 1931 Speedway Southern League, when riding for Leicester Stadium but soon transferred to Lea Bridge following the demise of the Leicester team. He later rode for Coventry.
