= Gil Craven =

British motorcycle speedway rider

- Born: 30 May 1917; Ilford, East London, England
- Died: circa 1990
- Nationality: British (English)

Career history
- 1939: West Ham Hammers
- 1948–1951: Cradley Heath Cubs/Heathens

Individual honours
- 1947: New Zealand champion

Team honours
- 1951: Central Shield

Gilbert Francis Craven (30 May 1917 – circa 1990) was an international motorcycle speedway rider from England. He earned one international cap for the England national speedway team and was champion of New Zealand.

== Biography ==
Craven started riding aged 18, just before World War II and following his older brother Malcolm Craven into the sport. He had previously served on a ship during the Spanish Civil War.

Craven began his speedway career with West Ham Hammers in 1939 as a novice in their training school and won the Jack Milne Trophy at Degenham. During his novice year Craven would appear for both Wembley Lions and Glasgow as a guest before making his West ham debut in August, where he scored four points.

With the outbreak of war, Craven's speedway career was halted and he worked as a ship's engineer in the merchant navy before spending time in the United States. He returned to speedway in 1947, winning the New Zealand Solo Championship and then in January 1948 he was a reserve in test series for England in Australia. During the 1948 Speedway National League Division Three he was wanted by Wembley and then contracted to Birmingham Brummies before ending up riding for the Cradley Heath Cubs (later Heathens), topping the team's averages with an impressive 9.52.

Although Craven rode well during the 1948 season, the year was overshadowed by tragedy because Gilbert and Malcolm's oldest brother Reginald Orram Craven was killed making his debut for Yarmouth Bloaters. He continued to ride for Cradley Heath for four seasons from 1948 to 1951 and became the club captain and represented England against Scotland in 1951. He left Cradley in late 1951 because he emigrated to New Zealand along with motorcycle racer Frank Desborough, to set up a motor repair business.
