= Oreti Park Speedway =

Speedway stadium in Invercargill, New Zealand

- Location: Pit Road, Oreti 9879, New Zealand
- Coordinates: 46°26′26″S 168°14′55″E
- Opened: 14 April 1974
- Length: 0.408 km (0.254 mi)

Oreti Park Speedway is a motorcycle speedway venue, located approximately 10 kilometres west from the centre of Invercargill, adjacent to the Oreti Beach.

== History ==
During the 1960s, two speedway enthusiasts Harry Robinson and Brian Mitchell identified a piece of land adjacent to a karting facility, that could be cleared and used for a track. They agreed a lease with the council and began construction, which turned out to be a very slow process due to a shortage of funds.

The track finally opened on 14 April 1974 and saw conventional speedway racing (known as Solos in Australia and New Zealand), sidecars and midget car racing. International riders, which included the legendary Ivan Mauger were attracted to race on the circuit and the reputation of the venue grew. An event called the meeting of world champions was a particular noted meeting in the calendar.

The track became a significant venue for important events, including a qualifying round of the Speedway World Championship in 1976 and 1983 but the club activities ended in the Spring of 1985 and the track laid dormant for 15 years.

The speedway returned, re-opening on 4 March 2000 and once again became a significant venue for speedway. It went on to host the New Zealand Solo Championship in 2008, 2010, 2014, 2017, 2020, 2023, 2024, and 2026.
