= Roger Wright (speedway rider) =

New Zealand speedway rider

- Born: 8 January 1945 (age 81); Christchurch, New Zealand
- Nationality: New Zealander

Career history
- 1969: Rayleigh Rockets
- 1972: Hackney Hawks
- 1972-1975: Teesside Tigers
- 1975-1977: Workington Comets
- 1978-1981, 1983: Berwick Bandits

Team honours
- 1980: National League KO Cup Winner

Roger Wright (born 8 January 1945) is a New Zealand former motorcycle speedway rider. He earned 8 caps for the New Zealand national speedway team.

== Career ==
Wright began riding in 1963 at the age of 19 at the Templeton track in Christchurch. His first success was winning the South Island Championship during the 1966-1967 season.

In 1969, Wright went to the UK to ride for the Rayleigh Rockets in the British League Division Two. He had a good debut season but returned home and stayed in Christchurch for the next two years. In 1972, after winning the South Island Championship again and finishing second in the New Zealand Speedway Championship he was offered a place in the Hackney Hawks division one team. He lost his place in this team early in the season but was loaned out to the second division side the Teesside Tigers, where he established himself as one of the team's top scorers.

For the next decade, Wright was based in the north of England and had spells with Teesside, Workington and Berwick in the second division. He continued to return home to New Zealand during the UK off season, and rode in 15 New Zealand Championships. The last was in 1985 where, at the age of 40, he finished third.
