= Roger Abel (speedway rider) =

New Zealand speedway rider (born 1954)

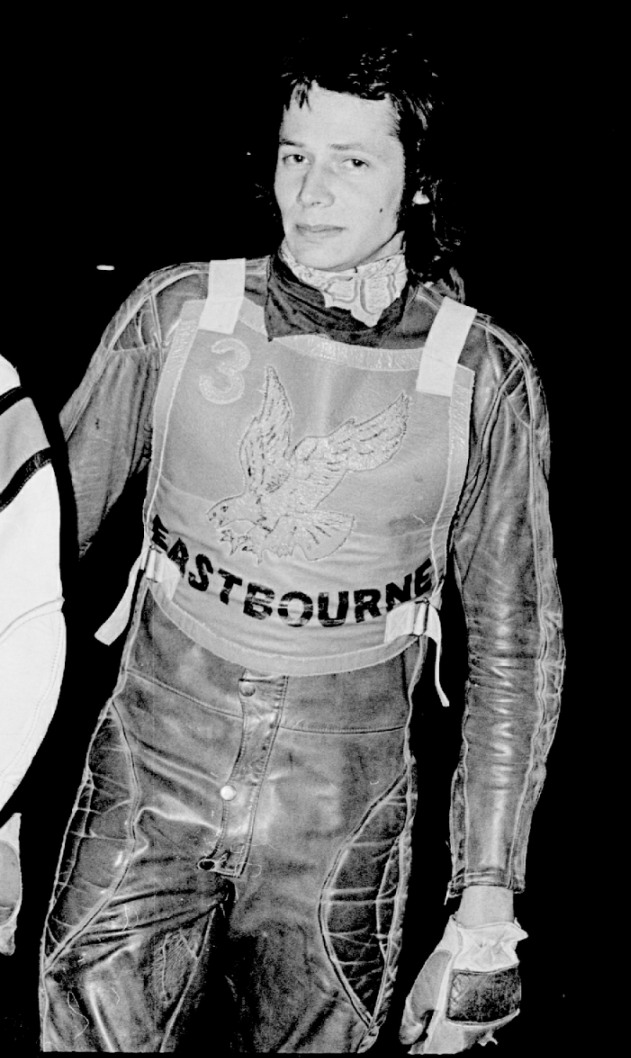
- Born: 8 April 1954 (age 72); Christchurch, New Zealand

Career history
- 1976-1979: Eastbourne Eagles
- 1977: Poole Pirates
- 1977: White City Rebels
- 1978: Reading Racers
- 1979: Canterbury Crusaders

Team honours
- 1979: Speedway World Team Cup gold medal
- 1977: National League Champion
- 1977, 1978: National League KO Cup Winner

Roger John Abel (born 8 April 1954) is a former international speedway rider from New Zealand. He earned one cap for the New Zealand national speedway team.

== Speedway career ==
Abel won a gold medal at the Speedway World Team Cup in the 1979 Speedway World Team Cup. He was the reserve for the New Zealand team, and although unused, he received the medal as one of the five named riders and was at the event ready to ride as a replacement in any heat called upon He rode in the top tier of British Speedway from 1976 to 1979, riding for Eastbourne Eagles, Poole Pirates, White City Rebels, Reading Racers and Canterbury Crusaders.

== World final appearances ==
=== World Team Cup ===
- 1979 - (England) London, White City Stadium (with Ivan Mauger / Larry Ross / Mitch Shirra / Bruce Cribb) - Winner - 35pts
