= 2026 SGB Championship =

Second tier of 2026 British speedway season

- League: SGB Championship
- No. of competitors: 9
- Champions: Poole Pirates
- Knockout Cup: Berwick Bandits
- BSN Series: Poole Pirates
- Pairs: Oxford Cheetahs
- Riders' Championship: Josh Pickering
- Highest average: Josh Pickering
- Division/s above: SGB Premiership
- Division/s below: 2026 NDL

The 2026 SGB Cab Direct Championship season was the 79th season of the second tier of British Speedway and the ninth known as the SGB Championship.

Poole Pirates were the defending league champions and Knockout Cup champions, while Redcar Bears were the defending BSN Series champions.

== Summary ==
The same nine clubs from 2025 competed in the 2026 Championship. The format remained the same with each team racing against each other twice (home and away), meaning a total of 16 fixtures each during the season. The Knockout Cup and the BSN Series also returned, both following the same formats as in 2025. The Oxford promotion only entered teams for the Championship and NDL.

The top four teams qualified for the playoffs, staged over two semi-finals and a final. The points limit for team building remained at 40 points with only one rider above an 8 average allowed in each team.

Locations of the 2026 SGB Championship teams

== League ==
=== Regular season ===
Pos.	Club	M	Home			Away			F	A	B	Pts	+/−
Pos.	Club	M	W	D	L	W	D	L	F	A	B	Pts	+/−
1	Poole Pirates **(Q)**	16	8	0	0	2	2	4	823	616	8	30	+207
2	Glasgow Tigers **(Q)**	16	7	1	0	2	1	5	727	689	6	26	+38
3	Scunthorpe Scorpions **(Q)**	16	7	1	0	1	1	6	748	691	6	24	+57
4	Edinburgh Monarchs **(Q)**	16	6	2	0	1	2	5	719	720	4	22	-1
5	Berwick Bandits	16	8	0	0	0	0	8	704	735	3	19	-31
6	Redcar Bears	16	6	0	2	1	0	7	706	734	4	18	-28
7	Plymouth Gladiators	16	6	0	2	1	0	7	686	751	3	17	-65
8	Workington Comets	16	4	1	3	1	0	7	673	765	2	13	-92
9	Oxford Cheetahs	16	5	1	2	0	0	8	665	750	0	11	-85

==== Fixtures and results ====
Home \ Away	BER	EDI	GLA	OXF	PLY	POL	RED	SCU	WOR
Berwick		53–36	46–44	53–37	49–41	47–43	46–44	56–34	56–34
Edinburgh	49–41		45–45	54–36	52–28	47–43	57–33	45–45	49–41
Glasgow	52–38	45–45		43–23	49–41	47–43	48–42	50–40	48–42
Oxford	52–38	50–40	41–49		48–42	45–45	46–44	51–39	43–47
Plymouth	55–35	43–47	49–41	50–39		47–43	34–56	49–41	49–41
Poole	60–30	52–38	55–35	60–30	59–31		54–36	58–31	61–29
Redcar	47–43	49–41	51–39	46–44	51–39	39–51		42–48	46–44
Scunthorpe	59–31	61–29	49–41	52–38	57–33	45–45	53–37		50–40
Workington	48–42	45–45	39–51	48–42	43–45	39–51	47–43	46–44	

Source: https://britishspeedway.co.uk/2026-championship-table-fixtures-results/
Legend: Blue = home team win; Yellow = draw; Red = away team win.

=== Play Offs ===
**Semi Finals**
1	**Poole Pirates**	**57**	39	96
4	Edinburgh Monarchs	33	**33**	66
3	**Scunthorpe Scorpions**	**53**	39	92
2	Glasgow Tigers	37	**51**	88

**Grand Final**
**Poole Pirates**	41	**49**	90+6
Scunthorpe Scorpions	**49**	41	90+3

Home team scores are in bold
Overall aggregate scores are in red

=== Final ===
First Leg

2 October

Scunthorpe Scorpions; Josh Pickering 13; Michael Palm Toft 13; Ryan Ingram 10; Luke Harrison 7 Connor Mountain 5 Nathan Ablitt 1 Jacob Hook 0	49–41	Poole Pirates; Zach Cook 8 Cooper Rushen 7 Lewis Kerr 7 Richard Lawson 6 Slater Lightcap 6 William Cairns 6 Kyle Newman 1	Eddie Wright Raceway; Referee(s): Michael Breckon

Second Leg

7 October

Poole Pirates; Richard Lawson 12; Zach Cook 11; Kyle Newman 10; Cooper Rushen 9 William Cairns 5 Slater Lightcap 2 Lewis Kerr 0	49–41	Scunthorpe Scorpions; Josh Pickering 12; Michael Palm Toft 9 Jordan Jenkins 7 Connor Mountain 7 Luke Harrison 4 Ryan Ingram 2 Nathan Ablitt 0	Poole Stadium; Referee(s): Paul Carrington

Super Heat

7 October	Poole Pirates; Zach Cook 4 Richard Lawson 2	6–3	Scunthorpe Scorpions; Josh Pickering 3 Michael Palm Toft 0

== Knockout Cup ==
The 2026 SGB Championship Knockout Cup (sponsored by MAXiCab) was the 58th edition of the Knockout Cup for tier two teams and the 9th edition under the SGB Championship Knockout Cup name.

**Round One**
**Poole Pirates**	**61**	40	101
Scunthorpe Scorpions	29	**50**	79

**Quarter Finals**
Oxford Cheetahs	**39**	34	73
**Poole Pirates**	49	**55**	104
**Berwick Bandits**	**58**	42	100
Workington Comets	32	**48**	80
Edinburgh Monarchs	39	**45**	84
**Redcar Bears**	**51**	45	96
**Plymouth Gladiators**	43	**51**	92
Glasgow Tigers	**47**	39	88

**Semi Finals**
Poole Pirates	**47**	35	82
**Berwick Bandits**	43	**55**	98
Redcar Bears	**47**	42	89
**Plymouth Gladiators**	43	**48**	91

**Final**
Berwick Bandits	**58**	45	103
Plymouth Gladiators	32	**45**	77

Home team scores are in bold
Overall aggregate scores are in red

=== Final ===
First Leg

26 September

Berwick Bandits; Reid Battye 15; Nick Morris 13; Peter Kildemand 11; Victor Palovaara 9 Jye Etheridge 6 Jack Smith 4 Jordan Jenkins r/r	58–32	Plymouth Gladiators; Ben Barker 11; Joe Thompson 6 Scott Nicholls 6 Danny King 4 Daniel Klíma 2 Anže Grmek 2 Ben Whalley 1	Shielfield Park; Referee(s): Mick Bates

Second Leg

10 October

Plymouth Gladiators; Ben Barker 12; Danny King 10; Joe Thompson 10; Anže Grmek 7 Vinnie Foord (guest) 4 Ben Whalley 2 Scott Nicholls 0	45–45	Berwick Bandits; Nick Morris 13; Jordan Jenkins 11 ictor Palovaara 8 Reid Battye 7 Jye Etheride 6 Senna Summer (guest) 0 Peter Kildemand 0	Plymouth Coliseum; Referee(s): Chris Durno

== BSN Series ==
=== Group Stage ===
Scottish Group

Fixtures

Home \ Away	BER	EDB	GLA
Berwick		57–33	49–41
Edinburgh	54–36		45–45
Glasgow	51–39	41–49	

Updated to match(es) played on unknown. Source:
Legend: Blue = home team win; Yellow = draw; Red = away team win.

Table

Pos.	Club	M	Home			Away			F	A	B	Pts	+/−
Pos.	Club	M	W	D	L	W	D	L	F	A	B	Pts	+/−
1	Edinburgh **(Q)**	4	1	1	0	1	0	1	181	179	1	**6**	+2
2	Berwick **(Q)**	4	2	0	0	0	0	2	181	179	1	**5**	+2
3	Glasgow	4	1	0	1	0	1	1	178	182	1	**4**	-4

Northern Group

Fixtures

Home \ Away	RED	SCU	WOR
Redcar		58–32	48–42
Scunthorpe	50–40		43–47
Workington	42–48	49–41	

Updated to match(es) played on unknown. Source:
Legend: Blue = home team win; Yellow = draw; Red = away team win.

Table

Pos.	Club	M	Home			Away			F	A	B	Pts	+/−
Pos.	Club	M	W	D	L	W	D	L	F	A	B	Pts	+/−
1	Redcar **(Q)**	4	2	0	0	1	0	1	194	166	2	**8**	+28
2	Workington	4	1	0	1	1	0	1	180	180	1	**5**	0
3	Scunthorpe	4	1	0	1	0	0	2	166	194	0	**2**	-28

Southern Group

Fixtures

Home \ Away	OXF	PLY	POL
Oxford		55–35	51–39
Plymouth	57–32		42–48
Poole	52–37	47–43	

Updated to match(es) played on unknown. Source:
Legend: Blue = home team win; Yellow = draw; Red = away team win.

Table

Pos.	Club	M	Home			Away			F	A	B	Pts	+/−
Pos.	Club	M	W	D	L	W	D	L	F	A	B	Pts	+/−
1	Poole **(Q)**	4	2	0	0	1	0	1	186	173	2	**8**	+13
2	Oxford	4	2	0	0	0	0	2	175	183	0	**4**	-8
3	Plymouth	4	1	0	1	0	0	2	187	192	1	**3**	-5

Knockout Stages

**Semi-finals**
**Redcar**	**58**	34	94
Berwick	31	**55**	86
**Poole**	44	**60**	104
Edinburgh	**46**	30	76

**Final**
Redcar	**48**	38	86
**Poole**	42	**52**	94

Home team scores are in bold
Overall aggregate scores are in red

=== Final ===
First Leg

22 September

Redcar Bears; Charles Wright 11; Jake Allen 10; Jake Mulford 6 Ace Pijper 6 Simon Lambert 6 Jason Edwards 5 Jody Scott 4	48–42	Poole Pirates; Zach Cook 12; Richard Lawson 7 William Cairns 7 Lewis Kerr 6 Cooper Rushen 6 Kyle Newman 4 Jordy Loftus (guest) 0	Ecco Arena; Referee(s): Willie Dishington

Second Leg

23 September

Poole Pirates; Zach Cook 11; Richard Lawson 10; Cooper Rushen 7 William Cairns 7 Kyle Newman 6 Lewis Kerr 6 Slater Lightcap 5	52–38	Redcar Bears; Charles Wright 14; Jake Allen 9 Jake Mulford 5 Jason Edwards 4 Jody Scott 3 Ace Pijper 3 Simon Lambert 0	Poole Stadium; Referee(s): Christina Turnbull

== Pairs Championship ==
The 2026 edition of the SGB Championship Pairs took place on Wednesday 2 September, at Wimborne Road, Poole. The competition was won by the Oxford Cheetahs, their first major honour since returning to the sport in 2022.

Qualifying heats

Pos	Team	Pts	Riders
1	Oxford Cheetahs	26	Sam Masters 14, Anders Rowe 12
2	Poole Pirates	23	Richard Lawson 12, Zach Cook 11
3	Berwick Bandits	20	Peter Kildemand 13, Nick Morris 7
4	Glasgow Tigers	19	Leon Flint 12, Chris Harris 7
5	Plymouth Gladiators	17	Danny King 12, Ben Barker 5
6	Scunthorpe Scorpions	17	Josh Pickering 15, Luke Harrison 2
7	Redcar Bears	16	Charles Wright 13, Jason Edwards 3
8	Edinburgh Monarchs	14	Dan Thompson 10, Kye Thomson 4
9	Workington Comets	10	Troy Batchelor 6, Drew Kemp 4

Semi-finals

Team One	Team Two	Score	Result
Oxford	Glasgow	6-3	Masters 4, Harris 3, Rowe 2, Flint 0
Berwick	Poole	5-4	Cook 4, Morris 3, Kildemand 2, Lawson 0

Final

Team One	Team Two	Score	Result
Oxford	Berwick	6-3	Masters 4, Morris 3, Rowe 2, Kildemand 0

== Riders' Championship ==
The 2026 edition of the SGB Championship Riders Championship took place on Saturday 12 September at Owlerton Stadium, Sheffield. The event was won by Josh Pickering, who scored a maximum during the qualifying heats and then won the final. Defending champion Chris Harris took second.

Pos.	Rider	Pts	Total	SF	Final
1	(Australia) Josh Pickering (Scunthorpe)	3,3,3,3,3	15	-	3
2	(England) Chris Harris (Glasgow)	0,3,2,2,3	10	3	2
3	(Australia) Zach Cook (Poole)	2,2,2,2,2	10	2	1
4	(Australia) Sam Masters (Oxford)	2,3,3,3,3	14	-	0
5	(Denmark) Peter Kildemand (Berwick)	3,2,3,2,2	12	1	
6	(Australia) Luke Killeen (Oxford)	1,2,1,3,3	10	0	
7	(England) Richard Lawson (Poole)	3,3,0,3,0	9		
8	(England) Dan Thompson (Edinburgh)	2,0,3,0,2	7		
9	(Australia) Kye Thomson (Edinburgh)	3,1,1,1,1	7		
10	(England) Danny King (Plymouth)	2,2,1,1,1	7		
11	(Denmark) Jonas Jeppesen (Workington)	1,1,2,2,R	6		
12	(England) Drew Kemp (Workington)	1,0,1,1,2	5		
13	(England) Leon Flint (Glasgow)	0,F,2,1,1	4		
14	(England) Jody Scott (Redcar)	0,1,0,0,1	2		
15	(England) Simon Lambert (Redcar)	1,1,0,R,0	2		
16	(Australia) Justin Sedgmen (Edinburgh)	0,0,0,0,0	0		

== Leading averages ==
	Rider	Team	Average
1	(Australia) Josh Pickering	Scunthorpe	10.69
2	(Australia) Sam Masters	Oxford	9.46
3	(England) Charles Wright	Redcar	9.12
4	(England) Richard Lawson	Poole	9.11
5	(Australia) Zach Cook	Poole	9.04
6	(Denmark) Nicolai Klindt	Redcar	9.00
7	(England) Chris Harris	Glasgow	8.97
8	(Denmark) Peter Kildemand	Berwick	8.66
9	(England) Danny King	Plymouth	8.60
10	(England) Scott Nicholls	Plymouth	8.59

- averages include league, play offs, knockout cup & bsn series, min 6 matches

== Squads ==
=== Berwick Bandits ===
- (Denmark) Peter Kildemand 8.66
- (Australia) Nick Morris 8.50
- (Australia) Jye Etheridge (C) 7.53
- (England) Jordan Jenkins 7.12
- (Australia) Reid Battye 6.58
- (Sweden) Victor Palovaara 6.52
- (Norway) Lasse Fredriksen 5.49
- (England) Jack Smith 4.43

=== Edinburgh Monarchs ===
- (Australia) Kye Thomson 8.52
- (England) Dan Thompson 8.04
- (Australia) Justin Sedgmen 7.71
- (Italy) Paco Castagna (C) 6.48
- (Sweden) Jonatan Grahn 6.25
- (Australia) Jordy Loftus 3.83
- (Australia) Mitchell Cluff 3.73

=== Glasgow Tigers ===
- (England) Chris Harris (C) 8.97
- (England) Leon Flint 8.51
- (England) Kyle Howarth 8.41
- (Denmark) Kevin Juhl Pedersen 6.53
- (Germany) Mario Hausl 4.39
- (England) Freddy Hodder 4.38
- (England) Sam Hagon 4.04

=== Oxford Cheetahs ===
- (Australia) Sam Masters (C) 9.46
- (England) Anders Rowe 6.87
- (Australia) Luke Killeen 6.36
- (Australia) Mitchell McDiarmid 6.05
- (England) Edward Kennett 5.16
- (Germany) Erik Riss 5.00
- (Australia) Dayle Wood 4.78
- (England) Darryl Ritchings 4.19

=== Plymouth Gladiators ===
- (England) Danny King 8.60
- (England) Scott Nicholls 8.59
- (England) Ben Barker (C) 7.82
- (England) Joe Thompson 7.00
- (Czech Republic) Daniel Klíma 5.82
- (Slovenia) Anze Grmek 4.17
- (England) Tom Spencer 1.74
- (New Zealand) Ben Whalley 1.14

=== Poole Pirates ===
- (England) Richard Lawson 9.11
- (Australia) Zach Cook (C) 9.04
- (England) Lewis Kerr 7.97
- (England) Will Cairns 7.08
- (England) Cooper Rushen 6.57
- (England) Kyle Newman 6.55
- (United States) Slater Lightcap 5.67
- (Australia) Fraser Bowes 4.33

=== Redcar Bears ===
- (England) Charles Wright 9.12
- (Denmark) Nicolai Klindt 9.00
- (England) Jody Scott 7.35
- (Australia) Jake Allen 7.02
- (England) Jason Edwards (C) 6.91
- (England) Jake Mulford 6.33
- (Scotland) Ace Pijper 5.64
- (England) Simon Lambert 4.75
- (England) Jordan Jenkins 4.55

=== Scunthorpe Scorpions ===
- (Australia) Josh Pickering (C) 10.69
- (Denmark) Michael Palm Toft 6.95
- (England) Luke Harrison 6.58
- (England) Connor Mountain 6.39
- (England) Dan Gilkes 5.53
- (England) Simon Lambert 5.48
- (England) Nathan Ablitt 5.42
- (England) Ryan Ingram 4.31
- (Australia) Jacob Hook 3.79

=== Workington Comets ===
- (England) Craig Cook 9.05
- (Denmark) Jonas Jeppesen 8.50
- (Australia) Troy Batchelor (C) 7.82
- (Australia) Tate Zischke 7.25
- (England) Drew Kemp 7.06
- (England) Vinnie Foord 4.08
- (Denmark) Niklas Holm Jakobsen 3.81
- (England) Max Perry 3.37
- (England) Jamie Etherington 1.00

== See also ==
- List of United Kingdom speedway league champions
- Knockout Cup (speedway)
