= Kihikihi Speedway =

Speedway stadium in Kihikihi, New Zealand

- Location: 53 Grey Street, Kihikihi 3800, New Zealand
- Coordinates: 38°02′17″S 175°21′30″E
- Length: 0.36 km (0.22 mi)

Kihikihi Speedway is a motorcycle speedway venue in Waikato, New Zealand, on the eastern edge of Kihikihi on Grey Street. The track races cars including stock cars, superstocks, midgets, sprint cars, sidecars and saloons in addition to motorcycles. The track is 360 metres.

== History ==
The facility has been the site of qualifying rounds of the Speedway World Championship, the first in 1982.

It has also held the final of the New Zealand Solo Championship in 1995 and 2002.
