= Rosebank Speedway =

Speedway stadium in Auckland, New Zealand

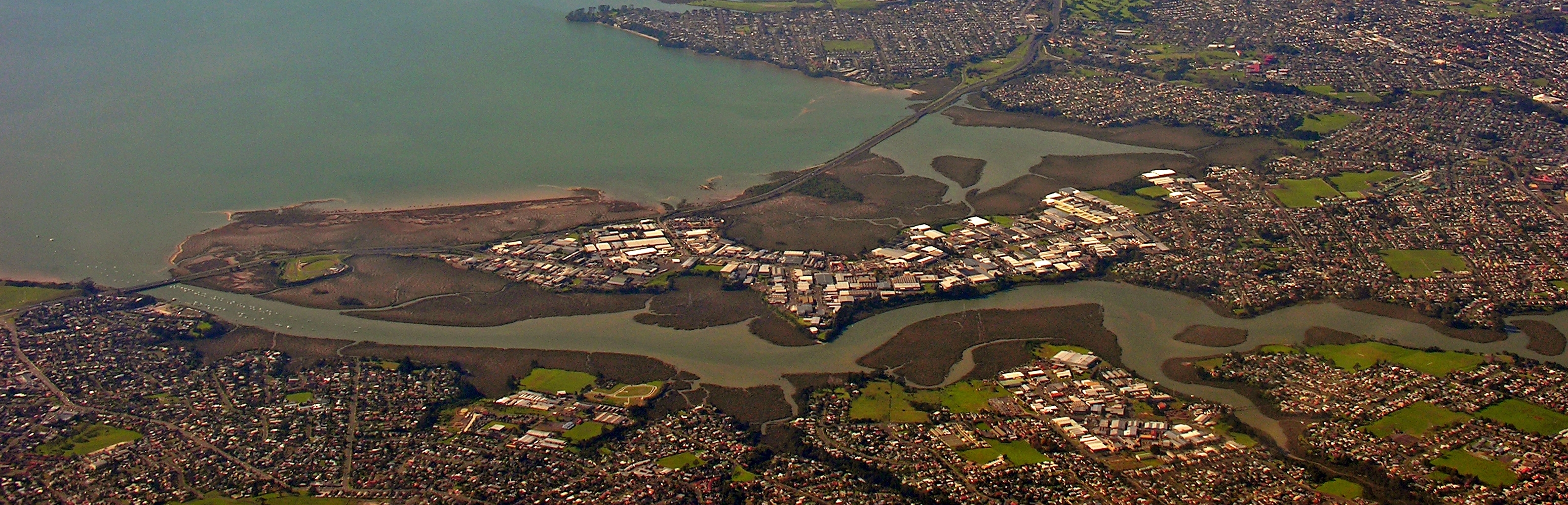
- The track can be seen on the left, by the bridge that crosses the Whau River
- Location: 126 Patiki Road, Avondale, Auckland 1026, New Zealand
- Coordinates: 36°51′47″S 174°39′45″E
- Website: https://rosebankspeedway.kiwi.nz/
- Length: 0.320 km (0.199 mi)

Rosebank Speedway is a motorcycle speedway venue approximately 2 kilometres north of the centre of Rosebank, Auckland. It is located in the Rosebank Park Domain, on the Patiki Road. The track also races sidecars and flattracks and has a smaller track inside the 320m circuit for junior racing.

The track is a significant venue for important motorcycle speedway events and has held the final of the New Zealand Solo Championship in 2006, 2011, 2013, 2016 and 2019.
