= George Congreve =

New Zealand speedway rider

- Born: 30 December 1999 (age 26); Christchurch, New Zealand

Career history
- 2022: Newcastle Diamonds
- 2023: Mildenhall Fen Tigers

Individual honours
- 2022, 2026: New Zealand champion
- 2019, 2020, 2021: New Zealand under-21 champion

Team honours
- 2023: Knockout Cup

George Congreve (born 30 December 1999) is a New Zealand speedway rider.

== Career ==
Congreve started riding speedway at the age of 12, at the Moore Park track in Christchurch. He began riding 500cc machines when he was 16, and he won the New Zealand Under 21 championship three times in 2018-19, 2019-20 and 2020-21.

Congreve was third at the 2020-21 New Zealand Solo Championship, and became the national champion in the 2022-23 season. In 2022, he began his British league career, signing for Newcastle Diamonds in the SGB Championship 2022, but unfortunately, the team withdrew from the league in June, leaving Congreve without a club. He did, however, continue to ride as a member of the Weymouth Wildcats team in meetings at the Isle of Wight.

Congreve joined Mildenhall Fen Tigers for the 2023 National Development League speedway season, and the Wightlink Warriors in the Nora League. He helped Mildenhall win the Knockout Cup.

In February 2026, Congreve won the New Zealand Solo Championship for a second time.
