= Bill Andrew =

New Zealand speedway rider and jockey

- Born: 13 December 1940 (age 85); Palmerston North, New Zealand
- Nationality: New Zealander

Career history
- 1962, 1964: Newcastle Diamonds
- 1965–1966, 1968: Poole Pirates
- 1970–1971: Newport Wasps
- 1973: Halifax Dukes

Individual honours
- 1965–1966: Johnny Thompson Memorial Trophy

Team honours
- 1964: Provincial League Champion

Errol Campbell Andrew (born 13 December 1940 in Palmerston North) is a New Zealand former motorcycle speedway rider and jockey. During his career as a jockey, he rode as E. C. Andrew, but when he was riding speedway he was known as Bill Andrew. He earned 15 international caps for the New Zealand national speedway team and 7 caps for Great Britain national speedway team.

== Speedway career ==
Andrew began riding at the Palmerston North Showgrounds track in 1961. He rode for the Newcastle Diamonds in the Provincial League in 1962 and 1964. He rode in the British League for the Poole Pirates from 1965 to 1968. He then had two years with the Newport Wasps. His final season was with the Halifax Dukes.

Andrew rode in two British Championship finals in 1965 and 1968 and was a member of the 1966 Great Britain team for a home and away test series with Poland. In 1966, he also rode in the Wills Internationale and the British League Riders' Championship. He was runner-up in the 1970 New Zealand Championship. From 1962 to 1973, he rode for New Zealand in team competitions in the United Kingdom and at home.

== Horse racing career ==
Andrew rode as a jockey in New Zealand and in England. When he was living in Somerset in the early 1970s he rode in steeplechase events for the Kennard Organisation. He also rode for John Richards and Stan Wright.
