= Awapuni Speedway =

Speedway stadium in Gisborne, New Zealand

- Location: Awapuni Road, Awapuni, Gisborne 4071, New Zealand
- Coordinates: 38°40′13″S 177°59′01″E
- Length: 0.389 km (0.242 mi)

Awapuni Speedway or Gisborne Speedway is a motorcycle speedway venue, located approximately 4 kilometres south west from the centre of Gisborne, on Awapuni Road, adjacent to the Awapuni Links golf course. The track races various types of cars, including sidecars, midgets, saloons, stockcars, streetstocks, in addition to motorcycle speedway.

== History ==
The track became a significant venue for important motorcycle speedway events, including qualifying rounds of the Speedway World Championship, the first in 1981.

It has also held the final of the New Zealand Solo Championship in 1986, 1991 and 2005.

The facility is currently called the Eastern Group Raceway due to its ownership.
