= Gary Allan (speedway rider) =

New Zealand speedway rider

- Born: 21 June 1967 (age 59); Manchester, England
- Nationality: New Zealander

Career history
- 1988–1991: Poole Pirates
- 1992: King's Lynn Stars
- 1993: Swindon Robins

Individual honours
- 1992: New Zealand Champion
- 1993: Second Division Riders' Champion

Gary Karl Allan (born 21 June 1967) is a British born former international speedway rider from New Zealand. He earned two caps for the New Zealand national speedway team.

== Speedway career ==
Allan was introduced to speedway by his father Gordon “Goog” Allan who rode for the Newcastle Diamonds from 1964 to 1968. His older brother Glenn was also a speedway rider. The family moved from New Zealand to Brisbane when he was 14 and he began riding speedway there when he was 17. In 1987, he was the inaugural winner of the Australian Under-21 Championship.

In February 1988, Allan also won the New Zealand under 21 Championship before moving to the UK to ride for the Poole Pirates in the National League. He broke his leg in his first season with the Pirates, but returned in 1989 and stayed with the team until 1991. The following year, he was loaned out by Poole to the Kings Lynn Stars and his final year in 1993 was with the Swindon Robins. This proved to be his most successful season. As the team’s number one rider, he achieved an 8.93 average, which put him among the top-ten riders in the league that year and he won the British League Division Two Riders Championship, held on 25 September at the Norfolk Arena. He defeated Mick Poole in a run off for the title after both riders finished on 13 points.

Although he was born in Manchester, and represented Australia in a test match with England in 1986, Allan decided to ride for New Zealand from 1988 onwards because he considered himself to be a New Zealander and held a New Zealand passport. He represented New Zealand at international level and won the New Zealand Championship in 1992.
