= Moore Park Speedway =

Speedway stadium in West Melton, New Zealand

- Location: Weedons Ross Road, West Melton 7676, New Zealand
- Coordinates: 43°28′34″S 172°23′06″E
- Length: 0.320 km (0.199 mi)

Moore Park Speedway is a motorcycle speedway venue approximately 5 kilometres north of West Melton. Located on Weedons Ross Road, it is adjacent to West Melton airfield. The track also hosts sidecar and flattrack races and includes a smaller track inside the 320 m circuit for junior racing.

The track is a significant venue for important motorcycle speedway events and has hosted the final of the New Zealand Solo Championship in 2012, 2015, 2018, and 2021.
