= David Bargh =

New Zealand speedway rider

- Born: 14 March 1962 (age 64); Martinborough, New Zealand
- Nationality: New Zealander

Career history
- 1978-1981, 1984, 1990-1992: Newcastle Diamonds
- 1980-1981: Hull Vikings
- 1982-1983: Sheffield Tigers
- 1985-1989: Coventry Bees
- 1991: Belle Vue Aces

Individual honours
- 1986, 1987, 1991, 2000: New Zealand Champion
- 1991: Div 2 League Riders' Runner-up

Team honours
- 1987: British League Champion
- 1985, 1987: British League Cup Winner

David Andrew Bargh (born 14 March 1962) is a former speedway rider from New Zealand. He earned 8 caps for the New Zealand national speedway team.

== Speedway career ==
Bargh is a four times champion of New Zealand, winning the New Zealand Championship in 1986, 1987, 1991 and 2000. He was runner up in the European Speedway Under 21 Championship in 1983.

Bargh rode in the top tier of British Speedway from 1978 until 1991, riding primarily for the Newcastle Diamonds. He was the subject to an unsuccessful attempt by Bradford Dukes to sign him in 1988.

== World Final appearances ==
=== World Pairs Championship ===
- 1987 - (Czech Republic) Pardubice, Svítkov Stadion (with Mitch Shirra) - 4th - 36pt (20)
- 1992 - (Italy) Lonigo, Santa Marina Stadium (with Mitch Shirra / Mark Thorpe) - 6th - 14pts

== Family ==
Bargh's nephew Andrew was a New Zealand champion in 2007.
