= Mark Thorpe =

New Zealand speedway rider

- Born: 26 March 1969 (age 57); Christchurch, New Zealand
- Nationality: New Zealander

Career history
- 1989-1994: Newcastle Diamonds
- 1994: Bradford Dukes
- 1995, 1996: Swindon Robins

Individual honours
- 1993, 1994, 1996: New Zealand Champion

Mark Andrew Thorpe (born 26 March 1969) is a former speedway rider from New Zealand. He earned 2 caps for the New Zealand national speedway team.

== Speedway career ==
Thorpe is a three times champion of New Zealand, winning the New Zealand Championship in 1993, 1994 and 1996.

Thorpe rode in the top tier of British Speedway from 1989 until 1996. After winning the under-21 New Zealand national title, he joined the Newcastle Diamonds in 1989, where he stayed for six years.

== World Final appearances ==
=== World Pairs Championship ===
- 1992 - (Italy) Lonigo, Santa Marina Stadium (with Mitch Shirra / David Bargh) - 6th - 14pts
