= Norman Morgan =

Welsh rugby player (born 1935)

- Full name: Norman Henry Morgan
- Born: 26 March 1935 (age 91) Monmouthshire, Wales
- School: Llanhilleth Secondary School

Rugby union career
- Position: Fullback
Senior career
Years	Team	Apps	(Points)
1955–62	Newport	209	(951)
International career
Years	Team	Apps	(Points)
1960	Wales	3	(14)

Norman Henry Morgan (born 26 March 1935) is a Welsh former international rugby union player.

Raised in Llanhilleth, Morgan was a left-footed fullback and played his early rugby with the British Army during national service, before joining Newport in 1955. He played over 200 games for Newport, scoring 951 points.

Morgan won three Wales caps in the 1960 Five Nations Championship, debuting against Scotland at home. He was the match-winner in his next appearance, against Ireland at Lansdowne Road, with a successful sideline conversion after captain Onllwyn Brace scored a try nine-minutes from the end, giving them a 10–9 victory.

== See also ==
- List of Wales national rugby union players
