= Ruapuna Speedway =

Speedway race track

CMG Motors Ruapuna Speedway
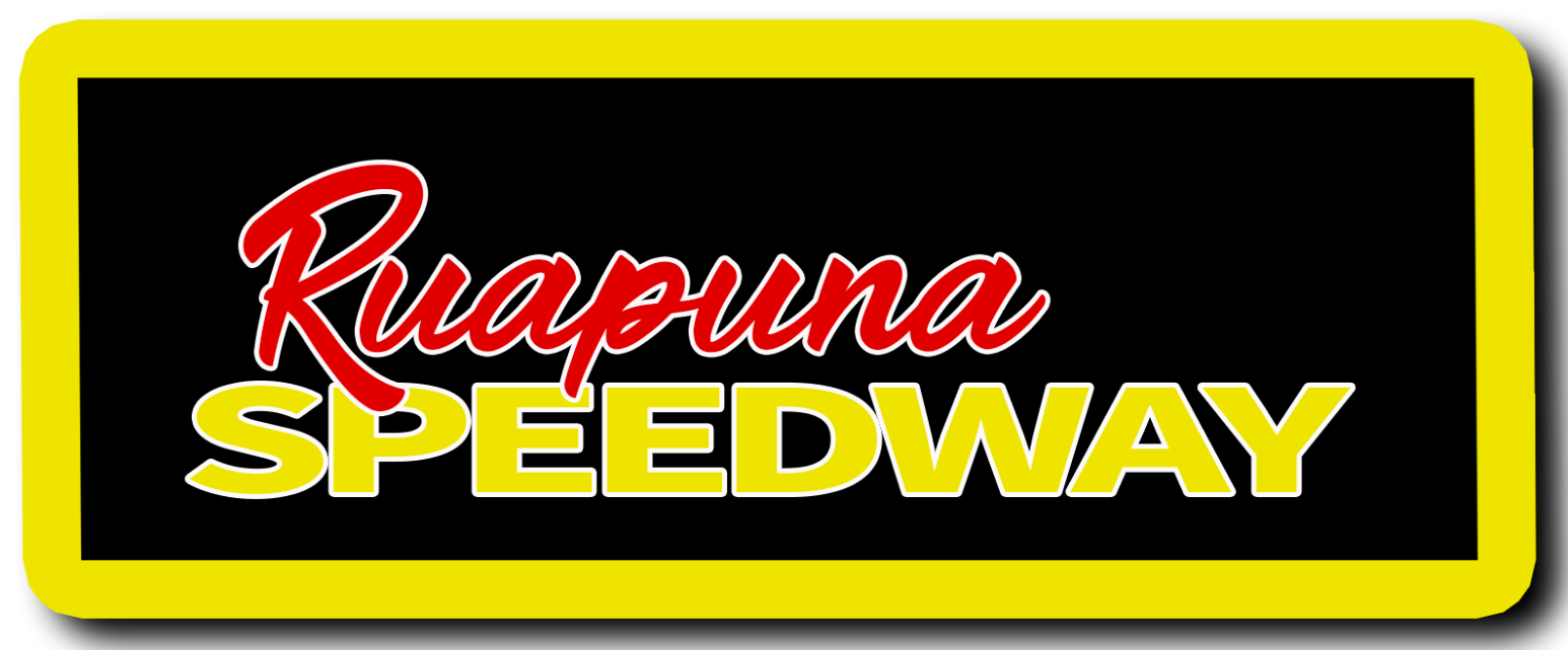
- Location: Christchurch, New Zealand
- Coordinates: 43°31′50″S 172°28′47″E
- Operator: Christchurch Speedway Association
- Opened: 1962
- Former names: Templeton Speedway
- Major events: Hydraulink War of the Wings; BT Race 4 Mates; Sprintcar Gold Cup; Sprintcar Salute to Goodie; Midget Gold Cup; All Associated New Zealand Championships (when rostered)
- Website: ruapunaspeedway.co.nz

1/4 mile oval
- Surface: clay
- Length: 0.25 mi (0.40 km)

Ruapuna Speedway is a 1/4 mile dirt track located in Christchurch adjacent to Euromarque Motorsport Park. Currently known as CMG Motors Ruapuna Speedway for sponsorship reasons, and Formerly known as Templeton Speedway, Ruapuna is New Zealand's only purely open wheel speedway. Despite having a large history with motorcycle classes over past years, the track shifted towards a purely open wheel speedway focus. Motorcycles now sit permanently at Moore Park Speedway. Ruapuna has hosted many prestigious events including New Zealand Championships, the Sprintcar & Midget Gold Cups, and the BT Race 4 Mates. The track has pulled in many international competitors to race at the track across multiple classes and is a well known facility within New Zealand and Internationally.

== History ==
In 1959, the Aranui Speedway-based near the centre of Christchurch's ever growing CBD was forced to close and was subsequently torn down to make way for housing developments. To ensure the future of speedway continued in Christchurch, the Christchurch Speedway Association was formed and construction began on a new track at the Templeton Domain. The new Templeton Speedway opened on April 29th, 1962, with a daytime race meeting. The track faced issues with the foundation and racing did not return until the mid portion of February 1963. Templeton hosted its first night time meeting at its return. The 1980s beckoned a new era for the now renamed Ruapuna Speedway taking on many important New Zealand championships, including four New Zealand Sprintcar and Solo Championships. Ruapuna has continued to grow in fields and crowd numbers with new promotions ideas like Carnival Fireworks Night and Speedweek adding to the tally. Ruapuna Speedway hosted the 2022/23 New Zealand Sprintcar Championship and held a sold-out crowd.

== Events ==
=== Sprintcar Gold Cup ===
Beginning in the 2001/02 New Zealand Speedway Season, the Sprintcar Gold Cup began as a prestigious event for all Sprintcar drivers around New Zealand and the world to tick off their bucket list. The event has drawn many large names from across New Zealand, Australia and the United States, including former winners Buddy Kofoid, Allan Wakeling, Trevor Green, Jamie Larsen, Jonathan Allard, and Joel Myers Jr.

The 2024 edition of the event paid out $20,000 to win as a part of the inaugural Ruapuna Speedway Speedweek, tallying up 20% of the $100,000 prize pool. $60,000 was paid out during the combined Gold Cup / Salute to Goodie feature with the winner taking $20,000 and the remaining $40,000 being split between the rest of the field. The $20,000 sum is one of the largest amounts ever paid out to a winner of a New Zealand Speedway event, while the $60,000 overall prize pool was the largest amount offered by a club run Sprintcar event in New Zealand.

==== Sprintcar Gold Cup Champions ====
Season
Season	Winner	Race No.	Second Place	Third Place
2025-26	(United States) Joel Myers Jr	2NZ	(United States) Jonathan Allard	(Australia) Jock Goodyer
2024-25	(United States) Joel Myers Jr	3NZ	(New Zealand) Jamie Duff	(New Zealand) Matthew Leversedge
2023-24	(United States) Joel Myers Jr	1NZ	(United States) Jonathan Allard	(New Zealand) Michael Pickens
2022-23	(New Zealand) Stephen Taylor	9N	(New Zealand) Connor Rangi	(New Zealand) Jamie Duff
2021-22	(United States) Jonathan Allard	11USA	(New Zealand) Jamie Larsen	(New Zealand) Jamie Duff
2020-21	(United States) Jonathan Allard	2NZ	(New Zealand) Matthew Leversedge	(New Zealand) Stephen Taylor
2019-20	(United States) Buddy Kofoid	1NZ	(New Zealand) Jamie Duff	(New Zealand) Matt Honeywell
2018-19	(United States) Buddy Kofoid	8USA	(New Zealand) Jamie Larsen	(New Zealand) Rodney Wood
2017-18	(New Zealand) Jamie McDonald	71A	(New Zealand) Jamie Larsen	(New Zealand) Matt Honeywell
2016-17	(United States) Jonathan Allard	2NZ	(New Zealand) Dean Brindle	(New Zealand) Daniel Eggleton
2015-16	(New Zealand) Jamie Larsen	3NZ	(New Zealand) Jamie McDonald	(New Zealand) Jamie Duff
2014-15	(New Zealand) Jamie McDonald	3NZ	(New Zealand) Dean Brindle	(New Zealand) Jamie Duff
2013-14	(New Zealand) Jamie Larsen	82M	(New Zealand) Jamie McDonald	(New Zealand) Dean Brindle
2012-13	(New Zealand) Jamie Duff	19A	(New Zealand) Jamie McDonald	(New Zealand) Ray Baughan
2011-12	(New Zealand) Jamie Duff	19A	(New Zealand) Allan Woods	(New Zealand) Matt Honeywell
2010-11	(New Zealand) Colin Entwistle	68M	(New Zealand) Ian Easton	(New Zealand) Jamie McDonald
2009-10	(New Zealand) Allan Wakeling	27A	(United States) Ricky Logan	(New Zealand) Jamie McDonald
2008-09	(United States) Bill Rose	5USA	(New Zealand) Allan Wakeling	(New Zealand) Kevin Freeman
2007-08	(United States) Ricky Logan	10USA	(New Zealand) Dean Brindle	(United States) Steve Buckwalter
2005-06	(Australia) Trevor Green		(Australia) Garry Brazier	(New Zealand) Greg Clemence
2004-05	(New Zealand) Colin Entwistle	68M	(New Zealand) Kevin Clive	(New Zealand) Gerard Ness
2003-04	(New Zealand) Allan Wakeling	27A	(New Zealand) Tommy Rusher	(New Zealand) Phil Game
2002-03	(New Zealand) Phil Game	77A	(New Zealand) Allan Wakeling	(New Zealand) Gerard Ness
2001-02	(United States) PJ Chesson	1USA	(United States) Bud Kaeding	(New Zealand) Allan Wakeling

=== Midget Gold Cup ===
As Midget car racing grew at Ruapuna in the late 2010s and early 2020s, a new initiative to form a similar event to the Sprintcar Gold Cup, but for Midgets became apparent. The event on its inaugural run drew many North Island cars who travelled down for the event. While the event is yet to score an international competitor, it remains one of the most hotly contested events on the New Zealand Midget car calendar.

==== Midget Gold Cup Champions ====
Season
Season	Winner	Race No.	Second Place	Third Place
2025-26	(New Zealand) Alec Insley	71A	(New Zealand) Brad Mosen	(New Zealand) Mitch Fabish
2024-25	(New Zealand) Jeremy Webb	88C	(New Zealand) Regan Tyler	(New Zealand) Luke McClymont
2023-24	(New Zealand) Alec Insley	71A	(New Zealand) Jack Low	(New Zealand) Jeremy Webb

=== New Zealand Championships ===
Ruapuna Speedway, like all Speedway New Zealand officiated tracks around the country, are placed into a rotation for specific New Zealand Championships. Ruapuna has played host to many New Zealand Championships as well as multiple New Zealand Grand Prix's and South Island Championships all for varying classes. Ruapuna's first New Zealand Title was in 1964 and most recent in 2025.

==== New Zealand Sprintcar Championships Held ====
Season	Winner
2022/23	(New Zealand) Daniel Thomas
2016/17	(New Zealand) Jamie Larsen
2011/12	(United States) Sammy Swindell
2005/06	(New Zealand) Kerry Jones
2003/04	(New Zealand) Allan Wakeling
2001/02	(New Zealand) Allan Wakeling
1999/00	(New Zealand) Allan Wakeling
1997/98	(New Zealand) Allan Wakeling
1995/96	(New Zealand) Kerry Jones
1992/93	(New Zealand) Kerry Jones
1985/86	(New Zealand) Ronald Hobbs
1983/84	(New Zealand) Roger Gleeson
1981/82	(New Zealand) Selwyn Everett
1979/80	(New Zealand) Roger Bertram
1976/77	(New Zealand) Harry Pierson
1974/75	(New Zealand) Peter Annan
1973/74	(New Zealand) Peter Annan
1970/71	(New Zealand) Peter Annan

==== New Zealand Midget Championships Held ====
Season	Winner
2023/24	(New Zealand) Brad Mosen
2019/20	(New Zealand) Michael Pickens
2014/15	(New Zealand) Brad Mosen
2012/13	(New Zealand) Michael Pickens
2006/07	(New Zealand) Michael Pickens
2001/02	(New Zealand) Michael Kendall
1994/95	(New Zealand) Matt Thompson
1989/90	(New Zealand) Graham Standring
1981/82	(New Zealand) Owen Shaw
1977/78	(New Zealand) Ted Tracey
1972/73	(New Zealand) Barry Butterworth
1970/71	(New Zealand) Eddie James
1969/70	(New Zealand) Eddie James
1967/68	(New Zealand) Edwin Murray

==== New Zealand TQ Championships Held ====
Season	Winner
2024/25	(New Zealand) Jeremy Webb
2018/19	(New Zealand) Jeremy Webb
2013/14	(New Zealand) Duane Todd
2009/10	(New Zealand) Glen Durie
2002/03	(New Zealand) Stephen Harker
1991/92	(New Zealand) Dick Webb
1983/84	(New Zealand) Stephen Todd
1980/81	(New Zealand) Wayne Denovan
1975/76	(New Zealand) Paul Sutherland
1968/69	(New Zealand) Brian Prestidge
1965/66	(New Zealand) Clive Rhodes

==== New Zealand Solo Championships Held ====
Season	Winner
2006/07	(New Zealand) Andrew Bargh
2002/03	(New Zealand) Sam Taylor
2000/01	(New Zealand) Graham Hartshorn
1998/99	(New Zealand) Mark Jamieson
1995/96	(New Zealand) Mark Thorpe
1992/93	(New Zealand) Mark Thorpe
1989/90	(New Zealand) Larry Ross
1987/88	(New Zealand) Larry Ross
1984/85	(New Zealand) Larry Ross
1982/83	(New Zealand) Mitch Shirra
1978/79	(New Zealand) Larry Ross
1973/74	(New Zealand) Ivan Mauger
1971/72	(New Zealand) Bruce Cribb
1970/71	(New Zealand) Frank Shuter
1967/68	(New Zealand) Ronnie Moore
1966/67	(United Kingdom) Howard Cole
1964/65	(New Zealand) Murray Burt

==== New Zealand Sidecar Championships Held ====
Season	Winner
2013/14	(New Zealand) Paul Humphrey / Ben Franklin
2005/06	(New Zealand) Nick Edmonds / Paul James
1995/96	(New Zealand) John Hannon / Jason Wallis
1987/88	(New Zealand) Robert Vandenberg / Ken Dommett
1979/80	(New Zealand) Bruce Turner / Bruce Heglin
1976/77	(New Zealand) Graham Pullan / David Molyneau
1974/75	(New Zealand) Les Dwight Jr / Steve Unwin
1973/74	(New Zealand) Les Dwight Sr / Graham Pullan
1971/72	(New Zealand) Les Dwight Jr / Gavin Cox
1969/70	(New Zealand) Dave Tomkins / Lloyd Tomkins

==== New Zealand Minisprint Championships Held ====
Season	Winner
2004/05	(New Zealand) Dave Kerr
2001/02	(New Zealand) Shaun Cooke
1998/99	(New Zealand) Kevin Jamieson
1994/95	(New Zealand) Richard Battersby

=== Other Events ===
Ruapuna Speedway is a key host to the Hydraulink War of the Wings Sprintcar series, hosting upwards of two rounds per year. Additionally, for all but one year of its tenure, Ruapuna has played host to the BT Race 4 Mates. The 'BT' is a series of heat races and a feature race for Midgets and TQs dedicated to Bryce Townsend. Multiple North Island competitors come down for this event with over 25 cars registered for the 2026 edition. Another staple on the calendar is Carnival Fireworks Night, a November/December regular on the calendar holding racing, carnival rides and fireworks at the end of the night.

Ruapuna also hosted a $100,000 Speedweek, where multiple large events took place over 4 days of racing within the span of 8 days. The New Zealand Sprintcar Grand Prix headlined the first two days, while The Sprintcar & Midget Gold Cups headlined the final two days. The Midget Eliminator, Wingless Sprint Rumble, Salute to Goodie and BT Race 4 Mates were all supporting the inaugural event as major races. The second event hosted both Gold Cups, the Salute to Goodie, Midget Eliminator and Wingless Sprint Rumble as usual, joined by the TQ 20 Lapper and Lightning Sprint Clay Cup. This event took place during the 2023/24 and 2024/25 seasons before it was split up into two separate events for the 2025/26 season. Speedweek is expected to return for the 2026/27 season featuring the Sprintcar & Midget Gold Cups, Wingless Sprint Rumble, BT Race 4 Mates, Midget Eliminator and both the South Island Midget and Sprintcar titles.

== Promotions ==
Ruapuna Speedway is well known for their increased promotions presence in recent years. Recent events like Carnival Fireworks Night, $100,000 Speedweek, Last Man Standing Sprintcar Race and the King of the South Midget Eliminator have all been highly successful promotional ideas from the track. The track runs a bi-weekly TV Show labelled 'Methanol Madness', currently hosted by Louise Smith and AJ Batt, reviewing and previewing the racing at Ruapuna each week. Hero cards are available every race meeting for fans to collect and get autographs from drivers.

== Visiting Drivers ==
Ruapuna Speedway has played host to many visiting drivers and riders from other parts of New Zealand, Australia, the United States and the United Kingdom. Many overseas drivers have taken on the Ruapuna events early into their career, before moving up the ranks in their home country. Notable drivers / riders that have raced at Ruapuna Speedway include:

- (United States) Joel Myers Jr
- (Australia) Marcus Dumesny
- (United States) Jonathan Allard
- (United States) Tanner Holmes
- (United States) Kaleb Montgomery
- (United States) Brenham Crouch
- (United States) Buddy Kofoid
- (United States) Sammy Swindell
- (United States) AJ Foyt
- (New Zealand) Michael Pickens
- (United States) Zach Daum
- (United States) Zeb Wise
- (Australia) Jock Goodyer
- (United States) Spencer Bayston

== Track Records ==
As of November 2026, the current track records at Ruapuna Speedway are as follows:

Category	Time	Number	Driver	Date
Oval (1962-Present): 0.40 km
Sprintcars	0:12.315	2NZ	(United States) Joel Myers Jr	November 14th, 2026
Lightning Sprints	0:13.854	8C	(New Zealand) Liam Astle	April 6th, 2024
Midgets	0:14.057	1NZ	(New Zealand) Aaron Hodgson	November 14th, 2026
TQ Midgets	0:15.186	67A	(New Zealand) Kaleb Currie	January 21st, 2021
Wingless Sprints	0:15.846	5M	(New Zealand) Luke McClymont	April 22nd, 2022

== Track Awards ==
=== Speedway New Zealand ===
Year	Category	Nominated work	Result
2026	Best Media Support	Methanol Madness	Nominated
2026	Promotional Event of the Year	Ruapuna Speedway USA Invasion	Nominated
2026	Volunteer Speedway of the Year	Ruapuna Speedway	Nominated
2026	Community Initiative of the Year	Ruapuna Speedway "A Night On Us"	Won
2025	Volunteer Speedway of the Year	Ruapuna Speedway	Won
2025	Promotional Event of the Year	Ruapuna Speedway Speedweek	Nominated
2025	Best Media Support	Methanol Madness	Nominated
2025	Promotional Item of the Year	Temporary Tattoos	Nominated
2025	Community Initiative of the Year	Ruapuna Crowd Engagement	Nominated
2024	Volunteer Speedway of the Year	Ruapuna Speedway	Won
2024	Online Presence of the Year	Ruapuna Speedway	Won
2023	Event of the Year	New Zealand Sprintcar Championship	Won
2021	Promotional Event of the Year	Carnival Fireworks Night	Won
2015	Speedway T-shirt of the Year	Sprintcar 40th Anniversary T-shirt	Won
2015	Promotional Item of the Year	Collectors (Hero) Cards	Won
2014	Speedway Poster of the Year	NZ TQ Championship Poster	Won
2014	Promotional Item of the Year	Mail Drop Cards	Won (Note: Shared with Oreti Park Speedway)
2014	Speedway T-shirt of the Year	NZ Sidecar Championship T-shirt	Won
2010	Best Presented Club Speedway Facility	Ruapuna Speedway	Won
2010	Best Website	Ruapuna Speedway	Won
