= Jack Milne Cup =

American speedway event

The Jack Milne Cup is a speedway competition held in Costa Mesa, California in the United States.

It is run annually in honour of the 1937 World Speedway Champion Jack Milne. It is one of five major events held annually at the Costa Mesa Speedway.

== Past winners ==
Year	Winner	Runner Up	Third
1998	Bobby Schwartz
1999	Gary Hicks	Scott Brant	Andy Northrup
2000	Charlie Venegas	Shawn McConnell	Andy Northrup
2001	Gary Hicks	Josh Larsen	Bobby Schwartz
2002	Scott Brant	Josh Larsen	Eddie Castro
2003	Scott Brant	Gary Hicks	Randy DiFrancesco
2004	Mike Faria	Scott Brant	Chris Manchester
2005	Mike Faria	Chris Manchester	Ryan Fisher
2006	Charlie Venegas	Mike Faria	Bobby Schwartz
2007	Mike Faria	Gary Hicks	Ricky Wells
2008	Bobby Schwartz	Shawn McConnell	Jimmy Fishback
2009	Shawn McConnell	Jimmy Fishback	Tommy Hedden
2010	Shawn McConnell	Bobby Schwartz	Buck Blair
2011	Mike Faria	Billy Hamill	Jimmy Fishback
2012	Billy Janniro	Charlie Venegas	Shawn McConnell
2013	Billy Janniro	Tyson Burmeister	Jason Ramirez
2014	Billy Hamill	Max Ruml	Buck Blair
2015	Max Ruml	Aaron Fox	Broc Nicol
2016	Austin Novratil	Gino Manzares	Luke Becker
2017	Gino Manzares	Gage Geist	Aaron Fox
2018	Austin Novratil	Broc Nicol	Tyson Burmeister
2019	Max Ruml	Dillon Ruml	Billy Janniro
2020 to 2021 not held due to the COVID-19 pandemic
2022	Max Ruml	Gino Manzares	Billy Janniro
2023	Billy Janniro	Broc Nicol	Max Ruml
