= 2003 AMA National Speedway Championship =

Motorcycle racing competition

Seasons
- ← 2002 2004 →

The 2003 AMA National Speedway Championship Series was staged over two rounds, which were both held at Auburn on July 25 and September 26. Greg Hancock won the title for the fourth time, his first since 2000.

== Event format ==
Over the course of 20 heats, each rider raced against every other rider once. The field was then split into sections of four riders, with the top four entering the 'A' Final. Points were then awarded depending on where a rider finished in each final. The points in the 'A' Final were awarded thus, 20, 18, 16 and 14. Bonus points for were also awarded.

== Classification ==
| Pos. | Rider | Points | (United States) | (United States) |
| 1 | Greg Hancock* | 35 | 14 | 21 |
| 2 | Ryan Fisher | 35 | 19 | 16 |
| 3 | Billy Janniro | 34 | 16 | 18 |
| 4 | Billy Hamill | 33 | 21 | 12 |
| 5 | Mike Faria | 25 | 11 | 14 |
| 6 | Scott Brant | 20 | 12 | 8 |
| 7 | Bart Bast | 20 | 9 | 11 |
| 8 | Bobby Hedden | 19 | 10 | 9 |
| 9 | Chris Manchester | 18 | 8 | 10 |
| 10 | Charlie Venegas | 12 | 7 | 5 |
| 11 | Eddie Castro | 11 | 5 | 6 |
| 12 | Tommy Hedden | 10 | 6 | 4 |
| 13 | Bryan Yarrow | 8 | 1 | 7 |
| 14 | Eric Carrillo | 6 | 3 | 3 |
| 15 | Bobby Schwartz | 5 | 4 | 1 |
| 16 | Cam Rafferty | 2 | 2 | – |
| 17 | Bartek Bardecki | 2 | – | 2 |
| 18 | Mark Carillo | 0 | – | 0 |
| 19 | JJ Martynse | 0 | – | 0 |
| 20 | Chris Kerr | 0 | 0 | – |

- Greg Hancock beat Ryan Fisher in a run-off to claim the title.
