= 2016 AMA National Speedway Championship =

Motorcycle racing competition

Seasons
- ← 2015 2017 →

The 2016 AMA National Speedway Championship Series was staged over four rounds, held at Costa Mesa (May 22), Ventura (June 25), Industry (August 13) and Auburn (September 16). It was won by Billy Janniro, who beat Max Ruml and Dillon Ruml. It was the seventh title of Janniro's career, and his fourth in-a-row.

== Event format ==
Over the course of 20 heats, each rider races against every other rider once. The top eight scorers then reach the semi-finals, with first and second in those semi-finals reaching the final. Points are scored for every ride taken, including the semi-finals and final.

== Classification ==
Pos.	Rider	Points	(United States)	(United States)	(United States)	(United States)
1	Billy Janniro	77	21	18	17	21
2	Max Ruml	63	12	18	16	17
3	Dillon Ruml	46	6	15	12	13
4	Gino Manzares	43	18	6	8	11
5	Aaron Fox	42	8	7	16	11
6	Luke Becker	41	4	15	10	12
7	Bart Bast	40	14	10	7	9
8	Broc Nicol	40	9	13	9	9
9	Austin Novratil	31	12	9	10	–
10	Tommy Hedden	25	9	4	5	7
11	Charlie Venegas	22	6	–	9	7
12	Gage Geist	19	3	4	6	6
13	Kurtis Hamill	18	4	5	6	3
14	Mike Faria	11	4	2	3	2
15	Eddie Castro	8	–	8	–	–
16	Bryan Yarrow	7	–	–	–	7
17	Shawn McConnell	6	6	–	–	–
18	Ryan Bast	5	1	4	–	–
19	Dalton Leedy	4	–	0	1	3
20	Tyson Talkington	3	–	–	3	–
21	Rick Valdez	0	–	0	–	0
22	Charles Ermolenko	0	–	0	–	–
