= 2004 AMA National Speedway Championship =

Motorcycle racing competition

Seasons
- ← 2003 2005 →

The 2004 AMA National Speedway Championship Series was staged over three rounds, which were held at Auburn (August 6), Victorville (August 7) and Auburn (September 24). Greg Hancock won the title for a fifth time, and for the second time in succession.

== Event format ==
Over the course of 20 heats, each rider raced against every other rider once. The field was then split into sections of four riders, with the top four entering the 'A' Final. Points were then awarded depending on where a rider finished in each final. The points in the 'A' Final were awarded thus, 20, 18, 16 and 14. Bonus points for were also awarded.

== Classification ==
Pos.	Rider	Points	(United States)	(United States)	(United States)
1	Greg Hancock	58	21	17	20
2	Billy Hamill	56	17	20	19
3	Billy Janniro	52	18	18	16
4	Chris Manchester	40	14	12	14
5	Mike Faria	37	11	14	12
6	Bobby Hedden	33	12	10	11
7	Bart Bast	23	7	9	7
8	Tommy Hedden	21	8	8	5
9	Scott Brant	21	11	10	–
10	Charlie Venegas	21	6	5	10
11	Bryan Yarrow	19	9	1	9
12	Eric Carrillo	19	4	7	8
13	Eddie Castro	19	5	6	8
14	Tom Sephton	11	2	3	6
15	Chris Kerr	7	–	4	3
16	Shawn Harmatiuk	5	3	2	–
17	Bobby Schwartz	1	1	–	–
18	Mark Carillo	1	–	–	1
19	Bartek Bedecki	0	–	–	0
20	Matt Browne	0	–	0	–
