= 2014 AMA National Speedway Championship =

Motorcycle racing competition

Seasons
- ← 2013 2015 →

The 2014 AMA National Speedway Championship Series was staged over four rounds, which were held at Costa Mesa (June 7), Ventura (June 28), Industry (August 9) and Auburn (September 19). Billy Janniro took the title, his fifth in total, winning all four rounds.

== Event format ==
Over the course of 20 heats, each rider raced against every other rider once. The top eight scorers then reached the semi-finals, with first and second in those semi-finals reaching the final. Points were scored for every ride taken, including the semi-finals and final.

== Classification ==
Pos.	Rider	Points	(United States)	(United States)	(United States)	(United States)
1	Billy Janniro	81	21	18	21	21
2	Bart Bast	51	10	10	15	16
3	Max Ruml	51	14	17	13	7
4	Charlie Venegas	50	15	–	18	17
5	Tommy Hedden	35	6	7	11	11
6	Buck Blair	32	13	9	10	–
7	Broc Nicol	31	5	10	9	7
8	Eddie Castro	28	5	10	7	6
9	Austin Novratil	26	3	11	–	12
10	Bryce Starks	23	6	8	–	9
11	Jason Ramirez	20	3	4	8	5
12	Gino Manzares	19	–	19	–	–
13	Tyson Burmeister	18	15	–	3	–
14	Tyson Talkington	16	3	4	3	6
15	Shawn McConnell	15	9	–	6	–
16	Russell Green	15	4	1	6	4
17	Chris Kerr	12	–	–	1	11
18	Rocco Scopellite	9	–	4	4	1
19	Bobby Schwartz	7	5	–	2	–
20	Dan Faria	4	–	2	–	2
21	Travis Henderson	3	–	3	–	–
22	Mike Faria	3	1	–	–	2
23	JT Mabry	1	–	–	–	1
24	PJ Byrne	0	–	0	–	–
