= United States Speedway National Championship =

Motorcycle sport competition

- Sport: Motorcycle speedway
- Founded: 1998
- Most titles: Mike Bast (7)

The United States Speedway National Championship is an annual speedway championship to decide one of the two national champions of the United States. The Championship has always been staged at Costa Mesa Speedway and dates back to 1969. Since 1998 when Costa Mesa promoters split from the AMA, the competition has run completely separately from the AMA National Speedway Championship. It is not affiliated to the FIM.

== Roll of honour ==
Year	Winner
1969	Steve Bast
1970	Rick Woods
1971	Mike Bast
1972	Rick Woods
1973	Mike Bast
1974	Steve Bast
1975	Mike Bast
1976	Mike Bast
1977	Mike Bast
1978	Mike Bast
1979	Mike Bast
1980	Bruce Penhall
1981	Bruce Penhall
1982	Shawn Moran
1983	Kelly Moran
1984	Kelly Moran
1985	Alan Christian
1986	Bobby Schwartz
1987	Brad Oxley
1988	Steve Lucero
1989	Bobby Schwartz
1990	Mike Faria
1991	Mike Faria
1992	Chris Manchester
1993	Sam Ermolenko
1994	Sam Ermolenko
1995	Greg Hancock
1996	Steve Lucero
1997	Mike Faria
1998	Bart Bast
1999	Brad Oxley
2000	Charlie Venegas
2001	Chris Manchester
2002	Billy Hamill
2003	Scott Brant
2004	Billy Janniro
2005	Chris Manchester
2006	Charlie Venegas
2007	Billy Hamill
2008	Billy Janniro
2009	Ricky Wells
2010	Billy Janniro
2011	Billy Janniro
2012	Billy Hamill
2013	Billy Hamill
2014	Bryan Yarrow
2015	Aaron Fox
2016	Aaron Fox
2017	Broc Nicol
2018	Billy Janniro
2019	Billy Janniro
2020	Broc Nicol
2021	Not Staged
2022	Max Ruml
2023	Max Ruml
2024	Max Ruml
