= 2002 AMA National Speedway Championship =

Motorcycle racing competition

Seasons
- ← 2001 2003 →

The 2002 AMA National Speedway Championship Series was staged over three rounds, which were held at San Bernardino (August 14), Auburn (August 16) and Auburn (September 20). Billy Hamill successfully retained the title.

== Event format ==
Over the course of 20 heats, each rider raced against every other rider once. The field was then split into sections of four riders, with the top four entering the 'A' Final. Points were then awarded depending on where a rider finished in each final. The points in the 'A' Final were awarded thus, 20, 18, 16 and 14. Bonus points for were also awarded.

== Classification ==
| Pos. | Rider | Points | (United States) | (United States) | (United States) |
| 1 | Billy Hamill | 55 | 21 | 14 | 20 |
| 2 | Billy Janniro | 53 | 18 | 16 | 19 |
| 3 | Mike Faria | 42 | 9 | 19 | 14 |
| 4 | Eddie Castro | 36 | 14 | 10 | 12 |
| 5 | Greg Hancock | 36 | 16 | 20 | – |
| 6 | Scott Brant | 34 | 12 | 11 | 11 |
| 7 | Chris Manchester | 33 | 11 | 10 | 12 |
| 8 | Bobby Hedden | 24 | 1 | 5 | 18 |
| 9 | Bart Bast | 24 | 6 | 9 | 9 |
| 10 | Josh Larsen | 20 | 7 | 7 | 6 |
| 11 | Ryan Fisher | 18 | 10 | 8 | 0 |
| 12 | Alan Christian | 13 | – | 6 | 7 |
| 13 | Tommy Hedden | 12 | 5 | 2 | 5 |
| 14 | Bobby Schwartz | 12 | 4 | 4 | 4 |
| 15 | Gary Hicks | 8 | 8 | – | 0 |
| 16 | Bryan Yarrow | 8 | 0 | – | 8 |
| 17 | Chris Kerr | 6 | – | 3 | 3 |
| 18 | Eric Carillo | 4 | 3 | 1 | – |
| 19 | Randy DiFrancesco | 2 | 2 | – | – |
| 20 | Bobby Krips | 0 | 0 | – | – |
