= 2017 AMA National Speedway Championship =

Motorcycle racing competition

The 2017 AMA National Speedway Championship Series was staged over four rounds, held at Ventura (June 17), Santa Maria (July 29), Industry (August 12) and Auburn (September 16). It was won by Billy Janniro, who beat Max Ruml and Broc Nicol. It was the eighth title of Janniro's career, and his fifth in-a-row.

== Event format ==
Over the course of 20 heats, each rider races against every other rider once. The top eight scorers then reach the semi-finals, with first and second in those semi-finals reaching the final. Points are scored for every ride taken, including the semi-finals and final.

== Classification ==
Pos.	Rider	Points	(United States)	(United States)	(United States)	(United States)
1	Billy Janniro	72	16	20	16	20
2	Max Ruml	65	16	14	18	17
3	Broc Nicol	52	7	17	20	8
4	Gino Manzares	50	11	13	15	11
5	Luke Becker	45	19	13	–	13
6	Dillon Ruml	41	12	9	11	9
7	Aaron Fox	33	8	1	11	13
8	Austin Novratil	30	8	12	10	–
9	Gage Geist	24	6	9	5	4
10	Eddie Castro	23	12	7	2	2
11	Russell Green	21	5	6	7	3
12	Daniel Faria	20	4	6	5	5
13	Tommy Hedden	17	–	4	7	6
14	Ryan Fisher	11	11	–	–	–
15	Bart Bast	10	–	–	–	10
16	Bryan Yarrow	7	–	–	–	7
17	Bobby Schwartz	6	0	–	6	–
18	Charlie Venegas	6	–	–	–	6
19	Robbie Sauer	4	2	1	1	–
20	Tyson Talkington	3	–	3	–	–
21	Neil Facchini	3	–	–	3	–
22	Kurtis Hamill	3	–	–	–	3
23	Hayley Perrault	1	1	0	–	–
24	Blake Borello	1	–	1	–	–
25	Rich Schafer	1	–	1	–	–
26	Louie Mersaroli	1	–	–	–	1
27	River McDougal	0	–	0	–	–
28	Brad Sauer	0	–	–	0	–
