= 2009 AMA National Speedway Championship =

Motorcycle racing competition

Seasons
- ← 2008 2010 →

The 2009 AMA National Speedway Championship Series

Greg Hancock won his eighth national title.

== Event format ==
Over the course of 12 elimination races, 20 heats each rider raced against every other rider once. The riders get placed in a main event according to their earned points. The championship was run over three rounds at the Costa Mesa Speedway in Costa Mesa, California and the Gold Country Fairgrounds in Auburn, California.

== The Final Classification ==
Pos.	Rider	Points	CMS	AUB	AUB
Gold	Greg Hancock	62	20+1	20	20+1
Silver	Billy Janniro	53	18	18+1	16
Bronze	Bart Bast	40	10	16	14
4	Charlie Venegas	38	8	12	19
5	Kenny Ingalls	31	16	5	10
6	Bryan Yarrow	27	5	10	12
7	Eddie Castro	27	9	9	9
8	Ricky Wells	26	12	14	—
9	Tommy Hedden	25	3	11	11
10	Matt Becker	15	—	7	8
11	Gary Hicks	14	14	—	—
12	Greg Hooten	13	—	6	7
13	Tyson Burmeister	13	—	8	5
14	Jimmy Fishback	11	11	—	—
15	Mark Carrillo	9	—	3	6
16	Shawn McConnell	7	7	—	—
17	Bobby Schwartz	6	6	—	—
18	Bryce Starks	5	—	4	1
19	Alex Marrcucci	4	—	2	2
20	Buck Blair	4	4	—	—
21	Kelly Kerrigan	4	—	—	4
22	Mike Faria	2	2	—	—
23	Nate Perkins	2	1	1	—
