= 2005 AMA National Speedway Championship =

Motorcycle racing competition

Seasons
- ← 2004 2006 →

The 2005 AMA National Speedway Championship Series was staged over three rounds, which were held at Auburn (September 1), Industry Hills (September 2) and Auburn (October 7). Greg Hancock won the title for a sixth time, and for the third time in succession.

== Event format ==
Over the course of 20 heats, each rider raced against every other rider once. The field was then split into sections of four riders, with the top four entering the 'A' Final. Points were then awarded depending on where a rider finished in each final. The points in the 'A' Final were awarded thus, 20, 18, 16 and 14. Bonus points for were also awarded.

== Classification ==
Pos.	Rider	Points	(United States)	(United States)	(United States)
1	Greg Hancock	62	21	21	20
2	Billy Hamill	55	18	18	19
3	Charlie Venegas	46	16	14	16
4	Ryan Fisher	38	14	10	14
5	Bart Bast	30	11	7	12
6	Mike Faria	29	12	12	5
7	Nate Perkins	25	10	4	11
8	Tommy Hedden	23	5	8	10
9	Bryan Yarrow	22	4	16	2
10	Buck Blair	22	8	11	3
11	Bobby Schwartz	22	6	9	7
12	Eddie Castro	21	9	3	9
13	Chris Kerr	16	1	7	8
14	Shawn Harmatiuk	8	7	1	–
15	Jimmy Fishback	8	3	5	–
16	Justin Boyle	6	–	–	6
17	John Cook	4	–	–	4
18	Billy Hiles	4	2	2	–
19	JJ Martynse	1	–	–	1
