= 2008 AMA National Speedway Championship =

Motorcycle racing competition

Seasons
- ← 2007 2009 →

The 2008 AMA National Speedway Championship Series was staged over three rounds, which were held at Costa Mesa (June 7), Auburn (July 25) and Auburn (September 20). Defending champion Billy Hamill only raced in the opening round. In his absence, Billy Janniro won the title for the first time, winning all three rounds in the process. It was the first time neither Greg Hancock or Billy Hamill had won the title since Mike Faria in 1997.

== Event format ==
Over the course of 20 heats, each rider raced against every other rider once. The field was then split into sections of four riders, with the top four entering the 'A' Final. Points were then awarded depending on where a rider finished in each final. The points in the 'A' Final were awarded thus, 21, 18, 16 and 14. Bonus points were also awarded.

== Classification ==
Pos.	Rider	Points	(United States)	(United States)	(United States)
1	Billy Janniro	62	21	21	20
2	Bart Bast	42	10	18	14
3	Bryan Yarrow	38	3	16	19
4	Mike Faria	38	14	12	12
5	Ricky Wells	35	16	9	10
6	Charlie Venegas	35	12	14	9
7	Kenny Ingalls	25	5	4	16
8	Tommy Hedden	23	4	8	11
9	Jimmy Fishback	22	11	11	–
10	Nate Perkins	20	6	6	8
11	Buck Blair	19	9	10	–
12	Billy Hamill	18	18	–	–
13	Bobby Schwartz	9	8	1	–
14	JJ Martynse	8	–	3	5
15	JT Mabry	7	–	–	7
16	Ben Essary	7	–	7	–
17	Shawn McConnell	7	7	–	–
18	Greg Hooten, Jr.	6	–	–	6
19	Eddie Castro	6	–	2	4
20	Tim Gomez	5	–	5	–
21	Ivan Sevart	3	–	–	3
22	Devin Defreece	2	–	–	2
23	Travis Henderson	2	2	–	–
24	Bryce Starks	1	–	–	1
25	Neil Facchini	1	1	–	–
