= 2007 AMA National Speedway Championship =

Motorcycle racing competition

Seasons
- ← 2006 2008 →

The 2007 AMA National Speedway Championship Series was staged over three rounds, which were held at Costa Mesa (June 2), Auburn (June 11) and Auburn (August 31). Billy Hamill took the title, his third in total, winning two of the rounds in the process.

== Event format ==
Over the course of 20 heats, each rider raced against every other rider once. The field was then split into sections of four riders, with the top four entering the 'A' Final. Points were then awarded depending on where a rider finished in each final. The points in the 'A' Final were awarded thus, 21, 18, 16 and 14.

== Classification ==
Pos.	Rider	Points	(United States)	(United States)	(United States)
1	Billy Hamill	60	18	21	21
2	Greg Hancock	55	21	16	18
3	Bart Bast	40	8	18	14
4	Charlie Venegas	39	14	9	16
5	Mike Faria	38	16	11	11
6	Tommy Hedden	35	11	14	10
7	Buck Blair	31	12	7	12
8	Bryan Yarrow	22	10	12	–
9	Bobby Schwartz	20	4	8	8
10	Nate Perkins	16	6	3	7
11	Shaun Harmatiuk	16	0	10	6
12	Ricky Wells	16	7	5	4
13	Eddie Castro	12	5	4	3
14	Greg Hooten, Jr.	9	–	–	9
15	Josh Larsen	9	9	–	–
16	Kenny Ingalls	8	0	6	2
17	JT Mabry	7	–	2	5
18	Shawn McConnell	3	3	–	–
19	Tim Gomez	2	2	–	–
20	Ryan Fisher	1	1	–	–
21	Josh West	1	0	1	0
22	Gary Hicks	1	1	–	–
