= 2013 AMA National Speedway Championship =

Motorcycle racing competition

Seasons
- ← 2012 2014 →

The 2013 AMA National Speedway Championship Series was staged over three rounds, which were held at Ventura (June 19), Victorville (September 22) and Auburn (September 27). Billy Janniro took the title, his fourth in total, winning two of the rounds in the process.

== Event format ==
Over the course of 20 heats, each rider raced against every other rider once. The top eight scorers then reached the semi-finals, with first and second in those semi-finals reaching the final. Points were scored for every ride taken, including the semi-finals and final.

== Classification ==
| Pos. | Rider | Points | (United States) | (United States) | (United States) |
| 1 | Billy Janniro | 56 | 21 | 14 | 21 |
| 2 | Billy Hamill | 54 | 18 | 18 | 18 |
| 3 | Gino Mazares | 42 | 17 | 14 | 11 |
| 4 | Max Ruml | 36 | 9 | 18 | 9 |
| 5 | Aaron Fox | 30 | 12 | 9 | 9 |
| 6 | Charlie Venegas | 28 | 5 | 9 | 14 |
| 7 | Bryan Yarrow | 21 | 4 | 7 | 10 |
| 8 | Eddie Castro | 21 | 10 | 6 | 5 |
| 9 | Buck Blair | 16 | 11 | 5 | – |
| 10 | Tommy Hedden | 16 | 7 | 4 | 5 |
| 11 | Bart Bast | 15 | – | – | 15 |
| 12 | Bryce Starks | 15 | 4 | 5 | 6 |
| 13 | Mike Faria | 12 | – | 7 | 5 |
| 14 | Tyson Burmeister | 11 | – | 11 | – |
| 15 | Josh Larsen | 10 | 10 | – | – |
| 16 | Jason Ramirez | 10 | 3 | 7 | – |
| 17 | Tyson Talkington | 8 | 1 | 4 | 3 |
| 18 | Bob Hicks | 7 | 3 | – | 4 |
| 19 | Bobby Schwartz | 2 | 2 | – | – |
| 20 | Kevin Chapman | 2 | – | 1 | 1 |
| 21 | Jamison Dilkey | 1 | – | 0 | 1 |
| 22 | Davey Shaw | 0 | – | 0 | – |
