= 2023 AMA National Speedway Championship =

Motorcycle racing competition

The 2023 AMA National Speedway Championship Series was staged over three rounds, held at Bakersfield (June 24), Industry Hills (August 5) and Auburn, California (September 16).

The title was won by Max Ruml, with Broc Nicol finishing second and 11-time champion Billy Janniro completing the podium. It was the second time Ruml had won the title, after also taking top honours in 2021

== Event format ==
Over the course of 20 heats, each rider raced against every other rider once. The top eight scorers then reached the semi-finals, with first and second in those semi-finals reaching the final. Points were scored for every ride taken, including the semi-finals and final.

== Final classification ==
Pos.	Rider	Points	(United States)	(United States)	(United States)
1	Max Ruml	59	19	21	19
2	Broc Nicol	47	15	19	13
3	Billy Janniro	44	15	10	19
4	Louie Mersaroli	38	10	15	13
5	Dillon Ruml	34	20	–	14
6	Slater Lightcap	30	7	10	13
7	Alex Martin	21	5	7	9
8	Russell Green	20	–	10	10
9	Blake Borello	18	11	7	–
10	Eddie Castro	14	5	4	5
11	Rheten Todd	13	6	7	–
12	Wilbur Hancock	13	6	5	2
13	Tim Gomez	11	–	11	–
14	Chris Kerr	10	10	–	–
15	Brad Sauer	9	2	5	2
16	Justin Almon	7	1	3	3
17	Timmy Dion	6	–	–	6
18	Michael Wells	6	5	–	1
19	Charlie Tirana	5	–	–	5
20	Daniel Faria	4	–	–	4
21	Austin Novratil	2	0	2	–
22	Greg Moore	2	1	1	–
23	Eloy Medellin	1	–	1	–
24	Rees Todd	0	0	–	–
25	Bobby Schwartz	0	–	0	–
