= 2012 AMA National Speedway Championship =

Motorcycle racing competition

Seasons
- ← 2011 2013 →

The 2012 AMA National Speedway Championship Series was staged over a single round, which was held at Auburn on September 28. Billy Hamill took the title, his fifth in total, dropping just one point in his opening ride.

== Event format ==
Over the course of 20 heats, each rider raced against every other rider once. The top eight scorers then reached the semi-finals, with first and second in those semi-finals reaching the final. The final positions were decided upon the placing in that final.

== Classification ==
- 28 September 2012
- (United States) Auburn

Pos.	Rider	Points	Details
1	Billy Hamill	23	(2,3,3,3,3,3,6)
2	Charlie Venegas	22	(3,3,3,3,3,3,4)
3	Bryan Yarrow	14	(3,2,3,0,2,2,2)
4	Gino Manzares	14	(1,3,3,3,2,2,0)
5	Bart Bast	11	(3,1,1,3,2,1)
6	Billy Janniro	10	(0,3,2,2,3,0)
7	Tommy Hedden	9	(3,2,1,2,1,0)
8	Aaron Fox	9	(2,0,2,1,3,1)
9	Bob Hicks	7	(2,0,1,2,2)
10	Alex Marcucci	7	(0,2,2,2,1)
11	Bryce Starks	4	(0,1,2,0,1)
12	Dan Faria	4	(1,1,0,1,1,)
13	Greg Hooten, Jr.	3	(2,0,0,1,-)
14	Charles Ermolenko	2	(0,2,0,0,0,)
15	Bobby Schwartz	2	(0,1,1,0,0)
16	Eddie Castro	1	(1,0,0,0,0)
