= 2018 AMA National Speedway Championship =

Motorcycle racing competition

The 2018 AMA National Speedway Championship Series was staged over four rounds, held at Prairie City (April 28), Ventura (June 23), Santa Maria (July 28) and Industry (August 11). It was won by Billy Janniro, who beat Luke Becker and Austin Novratil. It was the ninth title of Janniro's career, taking him clear of Greg Hancock on the all-time list, and his sixth in-a-row.

== Event format ==
Over the course of 20 heats, each rider races against every other rider once. The top eight scorers then reach the semi-finals, with first and second in those semi-finals reaching the final. Points are scored for every ride taken, including the semi-finals and final.

== Classification ==
Pos.	Rider	Points	(United States)	(United States)	(United States)	(United States)
1	Billy Janniro	78	18	20	20	20
2	Luke Becker	67	19	20	17	11
3	Austin Novratil	65	16	15	14	20
4	Dillon Ruml	45	10	10	13	12
5	Jimmy Fishback	42	7	7	16	12
6	Aaron Fox	35	8	5	10	12
7	Bart Bast	29	4	11	8	6
8	Russell Green	29	8	6	9	6
9	Tommy Hedden	28	5	11	8	4
10	Jason Ramirez	16	6	7	–	3
11	Broc Nicol	15	15	–	–	–
12	Tim Gomez	15	3	0	6	6
13	Eddie Castro	14	1	6	5	2
14	Daniel Faria	14	4	7	3	–
15	Max Ruml	11	–	–	–	11
16	Tyson Burmeister	10	10	–	–	–
17	Blake Borello	8	–	–	3	5
18	Samuel Ramirez	7	–	7	–	–
19	Charlie Venegas	7	–	–	–	7
20	Michael Wells	5	–	3	2	–
21	Bryan Yarrow	3	3	–	0	–
22	Kurtis Hamill	3	–	3	–	–
23	Mike Lane	1	–	–	1	–
24	Mike Miller	1	–	–	1	–
25	Hayley Perrault	0	–	0	–	–
26	William McCloskey	1	0	0	–	1
27	Jeremy Estes	0	0	–	–	–
28	Eloy Medellin Jr.	0	–	–	–	0
