= 2015 AMA National Speedway Championship =

Motorcycle racing competition

Seasons
- ← 2014 2016 →

The 2015 AMA National Speedway Championship Series was staged over four rounds, which were held at Costa Mesa (May 30), Ventura (June 27), Industry (August 8) and Auburn (September 18). Billy Janniro took the title, his sixth in total, winning two of the four rounds.

== Event format ==
Over the course of 20 heats, each rider raced against every other rider once. The top eight scorers then reached the semi-finals, with first and second in those semi-finals reaching the final. Points were scored for every ride taken, including the semi-finals and final.

== Classification ==
| Pos. | Rider | Points | (United States) | (United States) | (United States) | (United States) |
| 1 | Billy Janniro | 76 | 16 | 20 | 21 | 19 |
| 2 | Max Ruml | 60 | 12 | 20 | 16 | 12 |
| 3 | Bart Bast | 51 | 9 | 11 | 11 | 20 |
| 4 | Broc Nicol | 40 | 14 | 16 | 10 | – |
| 5 | Dillon Ruml | 36 | 7 | 9 | 9 | 11 |
| 6 | Aaron Fox | 35 | 18 | – | 17 | – |
| 7 | Luke Becker | 34 | 3 | 12 | 8 | 11 |
| 8 | Tommy Hedden | 32 | 5 | 10 | 7 | 10 |
| 9 | Charlie Venegas | 32 | 6 | 1 | 13 | 12 |
| 10 | Buck Blair | 21 | 6 | 10 | 5 | – |
| 11 | Russell Green | 20 | 4 | 4 | 5 | 7 |
| 12 | Billy Hamill | 18 | 18 | – | – | – |
| 13 | Bob Hicks | 14 | – | – | 6 | 8 |
| 14 | Tyson Talkington | 14 | 4 | 1 | 4 | 5 |
| 15 | Shawn McConnell | 10 | 6 | 4 | – | – |
| 16 | Gage Geist | 10 | 4 | 2 | – | 4 |
| 16 | Bryan Yarrow | 9 | – | – | – | 9 |
| 17 | Jason Ramirez | 8 | – | 8 | 0 | – |
| 18 | Bryce Starks | 8 | 4 | 4 | – | – |
| 19 | Rocco Scopellite | 7 | 1 | 6 | – | – |
| 20 | Austin Novratil | 4 | – | – | 4 | – |
| 21 | Dan Faria | 4 | – | – | 1 | 3 |
| 22 | Tyler Warren | 4 | – | – | 1 | 3 |
| 23 | David Mersaroli | 2 | – | – | – | 2 |
| 24 | Jamison Dilkey | 1 | – | 0 | – | 1 |
| 25 | Dryden Gayle | 0 | – | 0 | – | – |
| 26 | Mike Dalbey | 0 | – | – | 0 | – |
