= 2019 AMA National Speedway Championship =

Motorcycle racing competition

The 2019 AMA National Speedway Championship Series was staged over three rounds, held at Ventura (June 15), Industry (August 10), and Auburn (September 21). It was won by Billy Janniro, who beat Max Ruml and Gino Manzares. It was the tenth title of Janniro's career, and his seventh in-a-row.

== Event format ==
Over the course of 20 heats, each rider races against every other rider once. The top eight scorers then reach the semi-finals, with first and second in those semi-finals reaching the final. Points are scored for every ride taken, including the semi-finals and final.

== Classification ==
Pos.	Rider	Points	(United States)	(United States)	(United States)
1	Billy Janniro	59	21	18	20
2	Max Ruml	46	12	17	17
3	Gino Manzares	36	13	14	9
4	Russell Green	30	15	5	10
5	Bart Bast	25	9	5	11
6	Austin Novratil	24	8	16	–
7	Colton Hicks	20	6	14	–
8	Aaron Fox	20	–	–	20
9	Samuel Ramirez	18	11	4	3
10	Blake Borello	18	3	6	9
11	Tim Gomez	17	5	6	6
12	Tommy Hedden	17	0	9	8
13	Dillon Ruml	15	15	–	–
14	Eddie Castro	14	5	5	4
15	Bob Hicks	12	3	9	–
16	Daniel Faria	11	2	6	3
17	Jason Ramirez	10	7	2	1
18	Bryan Yarrow	8	–	–	8
19	Anthony Dion	5	–	–	5
20	Bobby Schwartz	2	–	2	–
