= Costa Mesa Speedway =

Motorsports venue in California, US

Coordinates: 33°40′06″N 117°53′59″W

Orange County, Ca
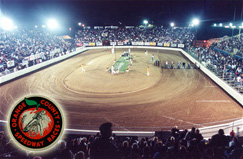
- Location: Orange County Fair and Event Center, 88 Fair Drive, Costa Mesa, CA 92626
- Capacity: 6,500
- Owner: International Speedway, Inc.
- Operator: International Speedway, Inc.
- Opened: 1969
- Major events: USA National Championship; Jack Milne Cup; Fair Derby; Warren Russell Cup

oval - 185 yds. on the pole 1/10 mile Width: Straight 33' Corners: 48'
- Surface: Clay base with decomposed granite surface

Costa Mesa Speedway in Costa Mesa, California, US, is a major motorsports venue credited with the renaissance of motorcycle speedway racing in Southern California. The 185 yards (169 metres) long track hosts both Solo and Sidecar speedway.

== History ==
In 1968, 1937 Speedway World Champion Jack Milne and motorcycle enthusiast Harry Oxley teamed up to promote motorcycle racing at the Orange County Fairgrounds (OC Fair & Event Center). Interest in motorcycle speedway racing was minimal for the first two years, but the sport soon enjoyed a rapid increase in popularity.

When Costa Mesa Speedway opened its doors in the summer of 1969, it was at the height of the surfer craze in Southern California; skateboarding, BMX and motocross were becoming popular with the state's middle class. As such, races at the Costa Mesa Speedway became standing room only at the weekly events by 1971. Top riders including World Champions with 13 titles between them Ivan Mauger (6 times) and Barry Briggs (4 times) from New Zealand and Ole Olson (3 time WC) from Denmark soon made the trip over to challenge the new American speedway riders.

The stadium was a significant venue for important events, including qualifying rounds of the Speedway World Championship, starting in 1977.

In 1981, Orange County native Bruce Penhall won his first Speedway World Championship at the famous Wembley Stadium in England, becoming the first American to do so since Jack Milne in 1937 (Milne had led an American 1-2-3 in 1937, defeating Wilbur Lamoreaux and his younger brother Cordy Milne). Penhall would repeat as World Champion in 1982 when he won at the Los Angeles Memorial Coliseum, the only time the World Final was ever held outside of England or Europe before the advent of the Speedway Grand Prix series in 1995. Two other Orange County natives finished in high places in the 1982 World Final, with Dennis Sigalos finishing in third place and Kelly Moran finishing fourth.

The popularity of the sport in North America peaked in the late 1970s and remained strong through the end of the century; it has waned somewhat since then. It has remained popular enough to spawn smaller tracks in California, among them tracks in Auburn, Industry and Victorville. European teams closely monitor the talent at these tracks and many riders are recruited by such teams.

Costa Mesa Speedway has enjoyed a host of track announcers over the years including Bruce Flanders, current announcer Terry Clanton and Motorcycle Hall of Fame inductee Larry Huffman, well known in Southern California radio markets for his "high-powered" motorsports advertising.

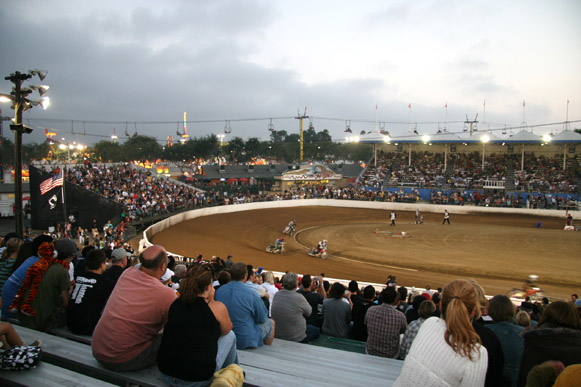
The 2008 Costa Mesa Speedway Fair Derby

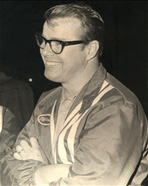
Co-Founder Harry Oxley

== Notable Costa Mesa Speedway Riders ==
Past/Current World Speedway Champions (American):

- Jack Milne (1937)
- Bruce Penhall (1981, 1982)
- Sam Ermolenko (1993)
- Billy Hamill (1996)
- Greg Hancock (1997, 2011, 2014, 2016)

Other Notable American Speedway Riders:

- Cordy Milne, Rick Woods, Kelly Moran, Shawn Moran, Bobby Ott, Scott Autrey, Scott Brant, John Cook, Billy Gray, Lance King, Josh Larsen, Rick Miller, Ron Preston, Dennis Sigalos,

More Current 1st Division American Riders:

- Bobby Schwartz, Charlie Venegas, Billy Janniro, Billy Hamill, Greg Hancock, Ryan Fisher, Ricky Wells,
