= 2022 AMA National Speedway Championship =

Motorcycle racing competition

The 2022 AMA National Speedway Championship Series was staged over three rounds, held at Bakersfield (June 25), Industry Hills (August 13) and Auburn, California (September 19).

The title was won by Billy Janniro, who beat defending champion Max Ruml. Janniro failed to win any round, with Ruml claiming all three, however he accumulated one more point throughout the series. Aaron Fox took third place to complete the podium.

It was the 11th time Janniro won the title, taking him three clear of Greg Hancock in the all-time rankings. It was also the fifth time Ruml had finished second.

== Event format ==
Over the course of 20 heats, each rider raced against every other rider once. The top eight scorers then reached the semi-finals, with first and second in those semi-finals reaching the final. Points were scored for every ride taken, including the semi-finals and final.

== Final classification ==
Pos.	Rider	Points	(United States)	(United States)	(United States)
1	Billy Janniro	56	19	18	19
2	Max Ruml	55	16	20	19
3	Aaron Fox	41	14	12	15
4	Gino Manzares	39	13	16	10
5	Louie Mersaroli	29	12	7	10
6	Blake Borello	24	6	8	10
7	Rheten Todd	22	9	6	7
8	Bart Bast	20	6	5	9
9	Austin Novratil	17	6	11	–
10	Russell Green	17	–	10	7
11	Alex Martin	17	9	3	5
12	Slater Lightcap	17	3	9	5
13	Tyler Warren	14	3	4	7
14	Chris Kerr	12	12	–	–
15	Jonathan Oakden	6	0	3	3
16	Daniel Faria	5	5	–	–
17	Charles Ermolenko	5	–	–	5
18	Rees Todd	5	1	0	4
19	Randy DiFrancesco	4	4	–	–
20	Tim Gomez	4	–	4	–
21	Greg Moore	3	–	–	3
22	Eddie Castro	0	–	0	–
23	Shawn McConnell	0	–	0	–
24	Timmy Dion	0	–	–	0
