= 2006 AMA National Speedway Championship =

Motorcycle racing competition

Seasons
- ← 2005 2007 →

The 2006 AMA National Speedway Championship Series was staged over three rounds, which were held at Costa Mesa (August 5), Auburn (September 1) and Auburn (October 7). Greg Hancock won the title to equal Mike Bast's all-time record. It was also Hancock's fourth successive AMA title.

== Event format ==
Over the course of 20 heats, each rider raced against every other rider once. The field was then split into sections of four riders, with the top four entering the 'A' Final. Points were then awarded depending on where a rider finished in each final. The points in the 'A' Final were awarded thus, 20, 18, 16 and 14. Bonus points for were also awarded.

== Classification ==
Pos.	Rider	Points	(United States)	(United States)	(United States)
1	Greg Hancock	57	15	21	21
2	Billy Hamill	53	16	19	18
3	Mike Faria*	45	18	11	16
4	Charlie Venegas	45	20	16	9
5	Tommy Hedden	33	7	12	14
6	Eddie Castro	29	11	8	10
7	Bryan Yarrow	28	6	14	8
8	Bart Bast	27	5	10	12
9	Nate Perkins	27	9	7	11
10	Shawn McConnell	21	8	6	7
11	Bobby Schwartz	19	12	3	4
12	Shaun Harmatiuk	16	1	9	6
13	Josh Larsen	15	10	5	–
14	Buck Blair	12	3	4	5
15	Gary Hicks	5	4	1	–
16	Josh West	3	–	–	3
17	Wieslaw Oskiewwicz	2	2	–	–
18	JJ Martynse	2	–	2	–
19	Ivan Severt	2	–	–	2
20	TJ Fowler	1	0	–	1
21	George Fox	0	0	–	–

- Mike Faria won a run-off against Charlie Venegas to take third place in the Championship.
