= 2025 AMA National Speedway Championship =

Motorcycle racing competition

The 2025 AMA National Speedway Championship Series was staged over three rounds, with the opening two rounds held at Industry Hills on August 2 and August 9 and the final round held at Auburn on September 20.

Broc Nicol successfully defending the title he won in 2024.

The first round was won by former two-time champion Max Ruml, who finished ahead of Nicol and Slater Lightcap. However, Ruml and Nicol both scored 20 points on the night, leaving them tied at the top of the standings. Ruml also won the second and third rounds, however he accumulated less points than Nicol and finished as the runner-up.

== Event format ==
Over the course of 20 heats, each rider raced against every other rider once. The top eight scorers then reached the semi-finals, with first and second in those semi-finals reaching the final. Points were scored for every ride taken, including the semi-finals and final.

== Final classification ==
Pos.	Rider	Points	(United States)	(United States)	(United States)
1	Broc Nicol	60	20	20	20
2	Max Ruml	57	20	19	18
3	Slater Lightcap	41	14	12	15
4	Billy Janniro	38	12	16	10
5	Jimmy Fishback	23	11	12	–
6	Levi Leutz	23	7	5	11
7	Wilbur Hancock	22	2	9	11
8	Timmy Dion	21	10	5	6
9	Justin Almon	18	6	5	7
10	Alex Martin	17	9	8	–
11	Chris Kerr	16	–	5	11
12	Tim Gomez	14	11	3	–
13	Austin Novratil	13	–	13	–
14	Darren Armbruster	12	5	2	5
15	Daniel Faria	6	–	–	6
16	Nick Hohlbein	6	3	3	–
17	Rees Todd	5	–	–	5
18	Gregory Moore	5	–	1	4
19	Sammy Tetrault	4	–	–	4
20	Mike Fillebrown	3	3	–	–
21	Jordan Vanderham	2	2	0	–
22	Eddie Castro	2	2	–	–
23	Anthony Dion	2	–	–	2
24	Luke Whitcomb	1	1	–	–
25	Chase Kangas	1	–	–	1
