= 2011 AMA National Speedway Championship =

Motorcycle racing competition

Seasons
- ← 2010 2012 →

The 2011 AMA National Speedway Championship Series was staged over a single round, which was held at Auburn on September 30. Billy Janniro took the title, his third in total, scoring a maximum in the process.

== Event format ==
Over the course of 20 heats, each rider raced against every other rider once. The top eight scorers then reached the semi-finals, with first and second in those semi-finals reaching the final. The final counted for double points, with the overall positions decided upon the total points scored in the meeting.

== Classification ==
- 30 September 2011
- (United States) Auburn

| Pos. | Rider | Points | Details |
|---|---|---|---|
| 1 | Billy Janniro | 24 | (3,3,3,3,3,3,6) |
| 2 | Bryan Yarrow | 20 | (3,2,3,2,3,3,4) |
| 3 | Charlie Venegas | 15 | (3,3,2,3,0,2,2) |
| 4 | Bart Bast | 12 | (3,3,3,0,2,1) |
| 5 | Tommy Hedden | 12 | (2,2,2,3,3) |
| 6 | Greg Hooten, Jr. | 11 | (2,1,3,3,1,1) |
| 7 | Charles Ermolenko | 9 | (0,2,2,2,1,2,0) |
| 8 | Bobby Schwartz | 9 | (1,2,2,2,2,0) |
| 9 | JT Martynse | 5 | (1,0,0,1,3) |
| 10 | JT Mabry | 5 | (2,1,1,1,-) |
| 11 | Alex Marcucci | 4 | (1,1,0,1,1) |
| 12 | Bryce Starks | 3 | (0,0,1,0,2) |
| 13 | Devin Defreece | 3 | (0,1,0,1,1) |
| 14 | Dan Faria | 2 | (2,0,0,0,0) |
| 15 | Chris Kerr | 2 | (0,0,0,0,2) |
