= 2013 Speedway World Cup =

54th edition of the annual motorcycle speedway World Cup competition

Speedway World Cup
- Venue: Prague
- Location: Czech Republic
- Start date: 13 July
- End date: 20 July
- Nations: 8

Champions
- Poland

The 2013 FIM Speedway World Cup (SWC) was the thirteenth FIM Speedway World Cup, the annual international speedway world championship tournament. It took place between 13 July and 20 July 2013 and involved eight national teams. Six teams were seeded through to the tournament and two qualification rounds were held in April and May 2011 to determine the final two places.

== Qualification ==
The top six nations from the 2012 Speedway World Cup (Poland, Denmark, Sweden, Great Britain, Australia and Russia) were granted automatic qualification, with the remaining two places divided among two qualifying rounds. Qualifying Round One was hosted in Daugavpils, Latvia and Qualifying Round Two was hosted in Miskolc, Hungary.

- Qualifying Round One
- (Latvia) Stadium Lokomotīve, Daugavpils
- 1 May 2013

National team	Pts	Scorers
Latvia	45	Andžejs Ļebedevs 15, Kjasts Puodžuks 11, Maksims Bogdanovs 13, Vjačeslavs Giruckis 6
Slovenia	30	Matej Žagar 20, Aleksander Čonda 4, Maks Gregoric 3, Matic Voldrih 3
Germany	28	Martin Smolinski 13, Kevin Wölbert 8, Tobias Busch 5, Max Dilger 2
Ukraine	22	Aleksandr Loktaev 9, Andrey Karpov 7, Stanislav Melnichuk 4, Andrey Kobrin 2

- Qualifying Round Two
- (Hungary) Borsod Volán Stadion, Miskolc
- 20 May 2013

National team	Pts	Scorers
United States	38	Ryan Fisher 14, Ricky Wells 12, Gino Manzares 6, Billy Janniro 6
Hungary	32	Norbert Magosi 9, József Tabaka 9, László Szatmári 7, Roland Benko 7
Italy	31	Guglielmo Franchetti 10, Paco Castagna 8, Nicolas Vincentin 7, Nicolás Covatti 6
France	20	Mathieu Trésarrieu 7, Sebastien Trésarrieu 7, Dimitri Bergé 5, Richard De Biasi 1

=== Qualified teams ===
Team	Qualified as	Finals appearance	Last appearance	2012 place
Czech Republic	Host	12th	2012	7
Denmark	2012 SWC top six	13th	2012	1
Australia	2012 SWC top six	13th	2012	2
Russia	2012 SWC top six	12th	2012	3
Sweden	2012 SWC top six	13th	2012	4
Poland	2012 SWC top six	13th	2012	5
Great Britain	2012 SWC top six	10th	2012	6
Latvia	QR 1 Winner	—	—	—
United States	QR 2 Winner	13th	2011	9

== Tournament ==
Semifinals
July 13 — Częstochowa
Poland	48
Australia	34
Latvia	27
Russia	14
July 15 — King's Lynn
Denmark	48
Great Britain	35
United States	24
Sweden	18

Race-off
July 18 — Prague
Australia	36
United States	31
Latvia	29
Great Britain	28

Final
July 20 — Prague
Poland	41
Denmark	40
Australia	33
Czech Republic	12

== Semi-finals ==
National team	Pts	Scorers
Poland	48	Jarosław Hampel 14, Krzysztof Kasprzak 13, Maciej Janowski 13, Patryk Dudek 8
Australia	34	Darcy Ward 14, Troy Batchelor 12, Jason Doyle 7, Davey Watt 1
Latvia	27	Maksims Bogdanovs 11, Kjasts Puodžuks 9, Andžejs Ļebedevs 7, Vjačeslavs Giruckis 0
Russia	14	Andrey Kudriashov 7, Vladimir Borodulin 4, Ilya Chalov 2, Viktor Kulakov 1

National team	Pts	Scorers
Denmark	48	Nicki Pedersen 13, Niels Kristian Iversen 12, Michael Jepsen Jensen 12, Kenneth Bjerre 11
Great Britain	35	Tai Woffinden 18, Chris Harris 12, Craig Cook 4, Edward Kennett 1
United States	24	Greg Hancock 16, Ricky Wells 4, Ryan Fisher 3, Gino Manzares 1
Sweden	18	Peter Ljung 11, Daniel Nermark 5, Dennis Andersson 2, Jonas Davidsson 0

== Race off ==
National team	Pts	Scorers
Australia	36	Darcy Ward 13, Jason Doyle 8, Cameron Woodward 8, Troy Batchelor 7
United States	31	Greg Hancock 20, Ryan Fisher 8, Ricky Wells 3, Gino Manzares 0
Latvia	29	Kjasts Puodžuks 10, Maksims Bogdanovs 9, Andžejs Ļebedevs 5, Vjačeslavs Giruckis 5
Great Britain	28	Tai Woffinden 14, Chris Harris 7, Lewis Bridger 4, Ben Barker 3

== World Cup final ==
=== Results ===
Pos.	National team	Pts.
1	Poland	41
2	Denmark	40
3	Australia	33
4	Czech Republic	12

=== Scorers ===
- Poland 41 - Jarosław Hampel [C] (15), Maciej Janowski (12) Krzysztof Kasprzak (7), Patryk Dudek (7)
- Denmark 40 - Niels Kristian Iversen (12), Kenneth Bjerre (11), Nicki Pedersen (10), Michael Jepsen Jensen (7)
- Australia 33 - Darcy Ward (9), Troy Batchelor [C] (11), Cameron Woodward (8), Jason Doyle (5)
- Czech Republic 12 - Aleš Dryml Jr. [C] (7), Václav Milík Jr. (3), Lukáš Dryml (1), Josef Franc (1)

== Final classification ==
Pos.	National team	Pts.
Gold	Poland	41
Silver	Denmark	40
Bronze	Australia	33
4	Czech Republic	12
5	United States	31
6	Latvia	29
7	Great Britain	28
8	Sweden	18
9	Russia	14

== See also ==
- 2013 Speedway Grand Prix
