= 2024 AMA National Speedway Championship =

Motorcycle racing competition

The 2024 AMA National Speedway Championship Series was staged over three rounds, held at Bakersfield (June 22), Industry Hills (August 3) and Auburn, California (September 21).

The title was won by Broc Nicol, who claimed all three rounds of the championship. Defending champion Max Ruml finished second with 11-time winner Billy Janniro taking the final place on the podium. It was the first time Nicol had won the title.

== Event format ==
Over the course of 20 heats, each rider raced against every other rider once. The top eight scorers then reached the semi-finals, with first and second in those semi-finals reaching the final. Points were scored for every ride taken, including the semi-finals and final.

== Intermediate classification ==
Pos.	Rider	Points	(United States)	(United States)	(United States)
1	Broc Nicol	55	20	15	20
2	Max Ruml	53	14	19	20
3	Billy Janniro	49	19	15	15
4	Alex Martin	33	12	12	9
5	Blake Borello	27	5	8	14
6	Chris Kerr	28	12	11	5
7	Slater Lightcap	22	10	12	–
8	Bart Bast	21	4	5	12
9	Louie Mersaroli	20	8	8	4
10	Russell Green	19	7	6	6
11	Timmy Dion	18	4	5	9
12	Eddie Castro	17	1	7	9
13	Charlie Trana	14	10	4	–
14	Austin Novratil	12	10	2	–
15	Daniel Faria	5	–	–	5
16	Justin Almon	4	–	4	–
17	Tim Gomez	3	–	3	–
18	Greg Moore	3	0	–	3
19	Darren Armbruster	3	–	–	3
20	Wilbur Hancock	2	2	–	–
21	Tisiah Prout	2	–	–	2
22	Jordan Vanderham	1	–	1	–
23	John Peters	0	–	–	0
