= 2010 AMA National Speedway Championship =

Motorcycle racing competition

Seasons
- ← 2009 2011 →

The 2010 AMA National Speedway Championship Series . The title was won by Billy Janniro, his second in total.

== Event format ==
Over the course of 12 elimination races, 20 heats each rider raced against every other rider once. The riders get placed in a main event according to their earned points.

== The Final Classification ==
Pos.	Rider	Points	AUB	AUB
Gold	Billy Janniro	41	20	20+1
Silver	Charlie Venegas	37	18+1	18
Bronze	Bart Bast	28	14	14
4	Bryan Yarrow	27	11	16
5	Tommy Hedden	24	12	12
6	Eddie Castro	18	10	8
7	Bobby Schwartz	18	7	11
8	Scott Brant	16	16	-
9	Alex Marcucci	12	2	10
10	Kelly Kerrigan	11	5	6
11	Bryce Starks	9	-	9
12	Tyson Burmeister	9	9	-
13	Jimmy Fishback	8	8	-
14	Brad Pappalardo	8	4	4
15	Russell Green	8	—	8
16	J.J.Martynse	6	1	5
17	Greg Hooten	6	6	—
18	Dan Faria	3	3	-
19	Thomas Reich	3	—	3
20	Devin Defreece	2	-	2
