= 2021 AMA National Speedway Championship =

Motorsport in Owego, New York

The 2021 AMA National Speedway Championship Series was staged over two rounds, held at Owego, New York (September 5) and Auburn, California (September 25). Three rounds were initially scheduled, however the first round at Greene, New York was cancelled due to poor track conditions. It was also the first championship since 2019, after the 2020 series was not held due to the COVID-19 pandemic.

It was won by Max Ruml, who beat Gino Manzares and Billy Janniro to the title. It was the first time Ruml had won the title, having previously finished as runner-up on four occasions.

== Event format ==
Over the course of 20 heats, each rider raced against every other rider once. The top eight scorers then reached the semi-finals, with first and second in those semi-finals reaching the final. Points were scored for every ride taken, including the semi-finals and final.

== Final Classification ==
Pos.	Rider	Points	(United States)	(United States)
1	Max Ruml	38	21	17
2	Gino Manzares	36	16	20
3	Billy Janniro	30	14	16
4	Austin Novratil	19	16	3
5	Blake Borello	19	12	7
6	Charlie Venegas	16	–	16
7	Jonathan Oakden	13	10	3
8	Spencer Portararo	13	9	4
9	Aaron Fox	11	–	11
10	Bart Bast	10	–	10
11	Louie Mersaroli	9	–	9
12	Russell Green	8	–	8
13	Brian Hollenbeck	8	5	3
14	Len McBride	7	7	–
15	Redmond Bohannon	6	6	–
16	Mike Cortose	6	6	–
17	Daniel Faria	5	–	5
18	Anthony Dion	5	–	5
19	Dave Oakden	5	4	1
20	Jerry Harman	3	3	–
21	David Meldrum	3	3	–
22	Dalton Oakden	2	2	–
23	Alex Heath	1	1	–
24	Pat Cliff	1	1	–
