= 2008 North American Under 21 World Qualifier =

Seasons
- ← 2007 2009 →

The 2008 North American Under 21 World Qualifier speedway event took place on August 29 in Auburn, California. The two qualifiers were Ricky Wells and Kenny Ingalls.

== Results ==
Pos.	Rider	Points	Details
1	(New Zealand) Ricky Wells	15	(3,3,3,3,3)
2	(United States) Kenny Ingalls	14	(3,3,2,3,3)
3	(United States) Alex Marcucci	12	(2,2,3,3,2)
4	(United States) JT Mabry	9	(1,1,3,3,1)
5	(United States) Jason Ramirez	9	(0,3,3,2,1)
6	(United States) Tim Gomez	9	(2,2,0,2,3)
7	(United States) Russell Green	8	(3,2,2,1,0)
8	(United States) Casey Donholt	8	(2,1,1,2,2)
9	(United States) Bryce Staks	8	(3,1,0,1,3)
10	(United States) Ben Essary	7	(1,0,1,3,2)
11	(United States) Ricky Felicio	7	(2,2,2,0,1)
12	(United States) Travis Henderson	5	(1,1,0,2,2)
13	(United States) Jay Ricketts	2	(0,0,0,1,1)
14	(United States) Tom Fehrman	2	(0,1,1,0,0)
15	(United States) Tori Hubbert	1	(0,0,1,0,0)
16	(United States) John Randolf	1	(0,1,0,0,0)
