= North American Under 21 World Qualifier =

Motorcycle speedway competition for teenagers and young adults

The North American Under 21 World Qualifier (usually referred to as the U.S. Under 21 Championship) is an annual speedway event held each year to qualify for a spot in the qualifying round of the World Under 21 Championships since 2003. The current US Champion is Bryce Starks.

== Age Limits ==
The minimum age of a rider to compete is 16 years of age (starting on the date of the rider's birthday). The maximum age is 21 years of age (finishing at the end of the year in which the rider celebrates his 21st birthday).

== Previous Winner ==
Year	Venue	Winners	Runner-up	3rd place
2003	(United States) Victorville, CA	Eric Carrillo	Bryan Yarrow	Ryan Fisher
2004	(United States) City of Industry, CA	Justin Boyle	TJ Fowler	Eric Carrillo
2005	(United States) Victorville, CA	Skyler Greyson	Dario Galvin	Tim Gomez
2006	(United States) City of Industry, CA	Neil Facchini	Dale Facchini	TJ Fowler
2007	(United States) Auburn, CA	Ricky Wells	Alex Marcucci	Kenny Ingalls
2008	(United States) Auburn, CA	Ricky Wells	Kenny Ingalls	Alex Marcucci
2009	(United States) Auburn, CA	Bryce Starks	Jason Ramirez	Russell Green
Year	Venue	Winners	Runner-up	3rd place

== See also ==
- United States national speedway team
