= Scott Brant =

Scott Brant may refer to:

- Scott Brant (cricketer) (born 1983), Zimbabwean cricketer
- Scott Brant (speedway rider) (born 1968), American professional speedway rider
