= Rick Woods =

Rick Woods may refer to:

- Rick Woods (speedway rider) (1948–2012), American international speedway racer
- Rick Woods (American football) (born 1959), American football safety
