= 2007 North American Under 21 World Qualifier =

2007 U21 Qualifier

Seasons
- ← 2006 2008 →

The 2007 North American Under 21 World Qualifier motorcycle speedway competition took place on 24 August in Auburn, California. The champion was Ricky Wells.

Pos.	Rider	Points
1	(New Zealand) Ricky Wells	14
2	(United States) Alex Marcucci	13
3	(United States) Kenny Ingalls	11
4	(United States) Mikey Buman	11
5	(United States) Greg Hooten	10
6	(United States) Dale Facchini	10
7	(United States) Travis Henderson	10
8	(United States) JT Mabry	9
9	(United States) Scott York	7
10	(United States) John Marquez	7
11	(United States) Steven Reece	6
12	(United States) RJ Becerra	4
13	(United States) Ronny Woodsford	4
14	(United States) Justin Boyle	2
15	(United States) Tom Fehrman	0
16	(United States) Michelle Fehrman	0
