= AMA National Speedway Championship =

American motorcycle championship

- Sport: Motorcycle speedway
- Founded: 1925
- Most titles: Billy Janniro (11)

The AMA National Speedway Championship is an annual speedway championship to decide the American Motorcyclist Association (AMA) national speedway champion. This event is separate from the (SRA) United States National Championships.

== Roll of honour ==
Year	Winner	Runner-Up	Third
1925	Sprouts Elder		
1926	Not Held		
1927	Art Pecher		
1928-1929	Not Held		
1930	Miny Waln		
1931	Miny Waln		
1932	Miny Waln		
1933	Wilbur Lamoreaux		
1934	Cordy Milne		
1935	Cordy Milne		
1937	Benny Kaufman		
1938-1945	Not Held		
1946	Wilbur Lamoreaux		
1947	Cordy Milne		
1948-1967	Not Held		
1968	Rick Woods		
1969	Steve Bast (14)	John Carter (13)	Rick Woods (11)
1970	Rick Woods (15)	Steve Bast (13)	Mike Bast (11)
1971	Mike Bast (13)	Mike Konle (13)	Larry Shaw (12)
1972	Rick Woods (15)	Scott Autrey (13)	Mike Bast (13)
1973	Mike Bast (14)	Mike Curoso (13)	Larry Shaw (12)
1974	Steve Bast (13)	Jeff Sexton (12)	Mike Bast (10)
1975	Mike Bast (15)	Dubb Ferrell (12)	Steve Nutter (11)
1976	Mike Bast (14)	Larry Shaw (13)	Bruce Penhall (12)
1977	Mike Bast (14)	Bruce Penhall (13)	Steve Bast (13)
1978	Mike Bast (13)	Gene Woods (12)	Bobby Schwartz (11)
1979	Mike Bast (15)	Alan Christian (13)	Larry Costa (12)
1980	Bruce Penhall (15)	Alan Christian (11)	Dubb Ferrell (11)
1981	Bruce Penhall (14)	Mike Bast (12)	John Sandona (12)
1982	Shawn Moran (14)	Mike Faria (12)	Dubb Ferrell (11)
1983	Kelly Moran (14)	Mike Faria (13)	Dubb Ferrell (11)
1984	Kelly Moran (14)	Bobby Schwartz (13)	John Sandona (11)
1985	Alan Christian (14)	Bobby Schwartz (12)	Mike Faria (11)
1986	Bobby Schwartz (14)	Robert Pfetzing (14)	Gary Hicks (10)
1987	Brad Oxley (14)	Bobby Ott (14)	Steve Lucero (12)
1988	Steve Lucero (12)	Phil Collins ( (United Kingdom) ) (11)	Sam Ermolenko (10)
1989	Bobby Schwartz (14)	Billy Hamill (13)	Phil Collins ( (United Kingdom) ) (13)
1990	Mike Faria (13)	Alan Christian (13)	Billy Hamill (12)
1991	Mike Faria (14)	Steve Lucero (13)	Robert Pfetzing (12)
1992	Chris Manchester (15)	Bobby Schwartz (13)	Steve Lucero (11)
1993	Sam Ermolenko (15)	Chris Manchester (12)	Charlie Venegas (11)
1994	Sam Ermolenko (14)	Josh Larsen (13)	Gary Hicks (12)
1995	Greg Hancock (13)	Bobby Schwartz (13)	Steve Lucero (12)
1996	Steve Lucero (18)	Mike Faria (17)	Louis Kossuth (11)
1997	Mike Faria (15)	Greg Hancock (14)	Charlie Venegas (13)
1998	Greg Hancock (14)	Bart Bast (12)	Mike Faria (12)
1999	Billy Hamill	Charlie Venegas	Mike Faria
2000	Greg Hancock	Charlie Venegas	Billy Hamill
2001	Billy Hamill	Billy Janniro	Ryan Fisher
2002	Billy Hamill (55)	Billy Janniro (53)	Mike Faria (42)
2003	Greg Hancock (35+3)	Ryan Fisher (35+2)	Billy Janniro (34)
2004	Greg Hancock (58)	Billy Hamill (56)	Billy Janniro (52)
2005	Greg Hancock (62)	Billy Hamill (55)	Charlie Venegas (46)
2006	Greg Hancock (57)	Billy Hamill (53)	Mike Faria (45)
2007	Billy Hamill (60)	Greg Hancock (55)	Bart Bast (49)
2008	Billy Janniro (62)	Bart Bast (42)	Bryan Yarrow (38)
2009	Greg Hancock (62)	Billy Janniro (53)	Bart Bast (40)
2010	Billy Janniro (41)	Charlie Venegas (37)	Bart Bast (28)
2011	Billy Janniro (24)	Bryan Yarrow (20)	Charlie Venegas (15)
2012	Billy Hamill (23)	Charlie Venegas (22)	Bryan Yarrow (14)
2013	Billy Janniro (56)	Billy Hamill (54)	Gino Manzares (42)
2014	Billy Janniro (81)	Bart Bast (51+3)	Max Ruml (51+2)
2015	Billy Janniro (76)	Max Ruml (60)	Bart Bast (51)
2016	Billy Janniro (77)	Max Ruml (63)	Dillon Ruml (46)
2017	Billy Janniro (72)	Max Ruml (65)	Broc Nicol (52)
2018	Billy Janniro (78)	Luke Becker (67)	Austin Novratil (65)
2019	Billy Janniro (59)	Max Ruml (46)	Gino Manzares (36)
2020	Not Held		
2021	Max Ruml (38)	Gino Manzares (36)	Billy Janniro (30)
2022	Billy Janniro (56)	Max Ruml (55)	Aaron Fox (41)
2023	Max Ruml (59)	Broc Nicol (47)	Billy Janniro (44)
2024	Broc Nicol (55)	Max Ruml (53)	Billy Janniro (49)
2025	Broc Nicol (60)	Max Ruml (57)	Slater Lightcap (41)

== Medals classification ==
(Since 1968)

Pos	Rider	Gold	Silver	Bronze	Total
1.	Billy Janniro	11	3	5	19
2.	Greg Hancock	8	2		10
3.	Mike Bast	7	1	3	11
4.	Billy Hamill	4	4	2	10
5.	Mike Faria	3	3	5	11
6.	Rick Woods	3		1	4
7.	Max Ruml	2	7		9
8.	Bobby Schwartz	2	4	1	7
9.	Steve Lucero	2	1	3	6
10.	Steve Bast	2	1	1	4
	Bruce Penhall	2	1	1	4
	Broc Nicol	2	1	1	4
13.	Sam Ermolenko	2		1	3
14.	Kelly Moran	2			2
15.	Alan Christian	1	3		4
16.	Chris Manchester	1	1		2
17.	Shawn Moran	1			1
	Brad Oxley	1			1
