= United States national speedway team =

United States national motorcycle speedway team

United States
- Nation color: White
- SWC Wins: 5 (1982, 1990, 1992, 1993, 1998)

World Championships
Team (SWC)	5	4	7
Pairs	3	2	3

The United States national speedway team are an international motorcycle speedway team governed by the American Motorcyclist Association. They compete in the major international speedway competitions, including the Speedway World Cup and Speedway of Nations and the former events the Speedway World Team Cup and the Speedway World Pairs Championship.

== History ==
After Jack Milne and his brother Cordy Milne had finished first and third at the 1937 World Final (with another American Wilbur Lamoreaux finishing second), the U.S. went into the speedway wilderness until the early 1970s, when international riders such as world champions Barry Briggs and Ivan Mauger from New Zealand began visiting the Costa Mesa Speedway in Los Angeles. Scott Autrey's appearance in the 1976 World Final in Poland, was the first American appearance since Ernie Roccio had finished 15th in 1951.

Autrey, who in the mid-1970s had campaigned hard and successfully to have American riders included in the Speedway World Championship, signalled an American resurgence in speedway and was soon followed by others, such as 1981 and 1982 world champion Bruce Penhall, brothers Kelly and Shawn Moran, Bobby Schwartz, Dennis Sigalos, Lance King, 1993 Individual Speedway World Championship world champion Sam Ermolenko, Rick Miller, 1996 world champion Billy Hamill, and four times world champion Greg Hancock all going on to be regarded as some of the world's best speedway riders.

== Major tournament wins ==
=== Speedway World Cup ===
The team has won the Speedway World Team Cup on five occasions, including their first win in 1982 which gave the U.S. the "Triple Crown" of speedway by winning the Individual, World Pairs and World Team Cup in the same year. The U.S. were a major force in the early 1990s, winning 3 out of 4 tournaments. Key riding members of the title wins include Billy Hamill (4 wins), Sam Ermolenko and Greg Hancock (both 3 wins).

The finals of both the 1985 and 1988 World Team Cups were held at the Veterans Memorial Stadium in Long Beach, California.

Year	Venue	Standings (Pts)	Riders	Pts
1982	(United Kingdom); London; White City Stadium	1. United States (37); 2. Denmark (24); 3. West Germany (18); 4. (Czech Republic) Czechoslovakia (17)	Kelly Moran	10
1982	(United Kingdom); London; White City Stadium	1. United States (37); 2. Denmark (24); 3. West Germany (18); 4. (Czech Republic) Czechoslovakia (17)	Bruce Penhall	10
1982	(United Kingdom); London; White City Stadium	1. United States (37); 2. Denmark (24); 3. West Germany (18); 4. (Czech Republic) Czechoslovakia (17)	Bobby Schwartz	9
1982	(United Kingdom); London; White City Stadium	1. United States (37); 2. Denmark (24); 3. West Germany (18); 4. (Czech Republic) Czechoslovakia (17)	Shawn Moran	8
1982	(United Kingdom); London; White City Stadium	1. United States (37); 2. Denmark (24); 3. West Germany (18); 4. (Czech Republic) Czechoslovakia (17)	Scott Autrey	0
1990	(Czech Republic); Pardubice; Svítkov Stadion	1. United States (37); 2. England (34); 3. Denmark (30); 4. (Czech Republic) Czechoslovakia (19)	Kelly Moran	12
1990	(Czech Republic); Pardubice; Svítkov Stadion	1. United States (37); 2. England (34); 3. Denmark (30); 4. (Czech Republic) Czechoslovakia (19)	Sam Ermolenko	11
1990	(Czech Republic); Pardubice; Svítkov Stadion	1. United States (37); 2. England (34); 3. Denmark (30); 4. (Czech Republic) Czechoslovakia (19)	Shawn Moran	10
1990	(Czech Republic); Pardubice; Svítkov Stadion	1. United States (37); 2. England (34); 3. Denmark (30); 4. (Czech Republic) Czechoslovakia (19)	Billy Hamill	4
1990	(Czech Republic); Pardubice; Svítkov Stadion	1. United States (37); 2. England (34); 3. Denmark (30); 4. (Czech Republic) Czechoslovakia (19)	Rick Miller	0
1992	(Sweden); Kumla; Kumla Speedway	1. United States (39); 2. Denmark (33); 3. England (31); 4. Sweden (17)	Greg Hancock	11
1992	(Sweden); Kumla; Kumla Speedway	1. United States (39); 2. Denmark (33); 3. England (31); 4. Sweden (17)	Sam Ermolenko	10
1992	(Sweden); Kumla; Kumla Speedway	1. United States (39); 2. Denmark (33); 3. England (31); 4. Sweden (17)	Billy Hamill	10
1992	(Sweden); Kumla; Kumla Speedway	1. United States (39); 2. Denmark (33); 3. England (31); 4. Sweden (17)	Ronnie Correy	5
1992	(Sweden); Kumla; Kumla Speedway	1. United States (39); 2. Denmark (33); 3. England (31); 4. Sweden (17)	Bobby Ott	3
1993	(England); Coventry; Brandon Stadium	1. United States (40); 2. Denmark (38); 3. Sweden (28); 4. England (14)	Sam Ermolenko	11
1993	(England); Coventry; Brandon Stadium	1. United States (40); 2. Denmark (38); 3. Sweden (28); 4. England (14)	Bobby Ott	11
1993	(England); Coventry; Brandon Stadium	1. United States (40); 2. Denmark (38); 3. Sweden (28); 4. England (14)	Billy Hamill	10
1993	(England); Coventry; Brandon Stadium	1. United States (40); 2. Denmark (38); 3. Sweden (28); 4. England (14)	Greg Hancock	10
1993	(England); Coventry; Brandon Stadium	1. United States (40); 2. Denmark (38); 3. Sweden (28); 4. England (14)	Josh Larsen	-
1998	(Denmark); Vojens; Vojens Speedway Center	1. United States (28); 2. Sweden (24); 3. Denmark (23); 4. Poland (17); 5. Germany (14); 6. Czech Republic (14); 7. Hungary (6)	Billy Hamill	16+1
1998	(Denmark); Vojens; Vojens Speedway Center	1. United States (28); 2. Sweden (24); 3. Denmark (23); 4. Poland (17); 5. Germany (14); 6. Czech Republic (14); 7. Hungary (6)	Greg Hancock	12+5
1998	(Denmark); Vojens; Vojens Speedway Center	1. United States (28); 2. Sweden (24); 3. Denmark (23); 4. Poland (17); 5. Germany (14); 6. Czech Republic (14); 7. Hungary (6)	Sam Ermolenko	-

==== Titles ====
Preceded by Denmark	World Champions; 1982 (1st title)	Succeeded by Denmark
Preceded by England	World Champions; 1990 (2nd title)	Succeeded by Denmark
Preceded by Denmark	World Champions; 1992 (3rd title); 1993 (4th title)	Succeeded by Sweden
Preceded by Denmark	World Champions; 1998 (5th title)	Succeeded by Australia

=== World Pairs Championship ===
Year	Venue	Standings (Pts)	Riders	Pts
1981	(Poland); Chorzów; Stadion Śląski	1. United States (28); 2. New Zealand (22); 3. Poland (21); 4. (Czech Republic) Czechoslovakia (18); 5. Denmark (17); 6. England (9); 7. West Germany (3)	Bruce Penhall	14
1981	(Poland); Chorzów; Stadion Śląski	1. United States (28); 2. New Zealand (22); 3. Poland (21); 4. (Czech Republic) Czechoslovakia (18); 5. Denmark (17); 6. England (9); 7. West Germany (3)	Bobby Schwartz	9
1982	(Australia); Sydney; Liverpool City Raceway	1. United States (30); 2. England (22); 3. Denmark (21); 4. Australia (16); 5. Finland (16); 6. New Zealand (13); 7. (Czech Republic) Czechoslovakia (8)	Dennis Sigalos	18
1982	(Australia); Sydney; Liverpool City Raceway	1. United States (30); 2. England (22); 3. Denmark (21); 4. Australia (16); 5. Finland (16); 6. New Zealand (13); 7. (Czech Republic) Czechoslovakia (8)	Bobby Schwartz	12
1992	(Italy); Lonigo; Santa Marina Stadium	1. United States (23+3); 2. England (23+2); 3. Sweden (22); 4. Italy (18); 5. Denmark (16); 6. New Zealand (14); 7. Australia (10)	Greg Hancock	11+3
1992	(Italy); Lonigo; Santa Marina Stadium	1. United States (23+3); 2. England (23+2); 3. Sweden (22); 4. Italy (18); 5. Denmark (16); 6. New Zealand (14); 7. Australia (10)	Sam Ermolenko	9
1992	(Italy); Lonigo; Santa Marina Stadium	1. United States (23+3); 2. England (23+2); 3. Sweden (22); 4. Italy (18); 5. Denmark (16); 6. New Zealand (14); 7. Australia (10)	Ronnie Correy	3

== International caps (as of 2022) ==
Since the advent of the Speedway Grand Prix era, international caps earned by riders is largely restricted to international competitions, whereas previously test matches between two teams were a regular occurrence. This means that the number of caps earned by a rider has decreased in the modern era.

Rider	Caps
Autrey, Scott	22
Bast, Bart	3
Bast, Steve	5
Burmesiter, Tyson	1
Chrisco, Keith	1
Cook, John	49
Correy, Ronnie	23
Curoso, Mike	1
Ermolenko, Charles	9
Ermolenko, Sam	51
Faria, Mike	7
Fisher, Ryan	8
Green, Randy	3
Gresham, Steve	20
Hamill, Billy	29
Hancock, Greg	39
Ingalls, Kenny	3
Ingels, Eddie	3
Janniro, Billy	11
Keeter, DeWayne	2
Kerr, Chris	3
King, Lance	47
Kosta, Larry	4
Lamoreaux, Wilbur	3
Larsen, Josh	11
Lucero, Steve	3
Manchester, Chris	3
Miller, Rick	34
Milne, Cordy	3
Milne, Jack	3
Moran, Kelly	47
Moran, Shawn	74
Nicol, Doug	4
Odom, Donny	1
Ott, Bobby	15
Oxley, Brad	12
Penhall, Bruce	34
Pfetzing, Robert	9
Preston, Ron	14
Pyeatt, Denny	10
Schwartz, Bobby	74
Sigalos, Dennis	52
Venegas, Charlie	1
Wells, Ricky	4
Werner, Brent	15
Woods, Rick	3

== See also ==
- AMA National Speedway Championship
- United States Speedway National Championship
