= DeWayne Keeter =

American dirt-track and motorcycle speedway rider

- Born: October 15, 1944; Ventura County, United States
- Died: May 1, 1975 (aged 30); Torrance, California

Career history
- 1969: Leicester Lions

DeWayne Keeter (October 15, 1944 – May 3, 1975) was an American dirt-track and motorcycle speedway rider. He earned two caps for the United States national speedway team.

== Career ==
Involved in motorcycle racing since the mid-1960s, Keeter had raced in speedway in the United States for only around six months before signing for Leicester Lions in 1969, becoming the first American rider to compete in the British League. Shortly before making his debut for Lions, he was seriously injured in a crash that resulted in five broken ribs, a punctured lung, and concussion, but despite this he averaged close to five points per match, including a paid maximum score.

After the 1969 season, Keeter returned to the United States where he continued to compete in dirt track racing, also riding in speedway in Australia in the early 1970s.

Keeter was critically injured in a crash at Ascot Park in California on May 1, 1975, dying two days later aged 30.
