= 1979 AMA National Speedway Championship =

Motorcycle racing competition

The 1979 AMA National Speedway Championship series was held at Champion Speedway in Owego, New York. Promoters Jack Crawford and Joe Biesecker also owned the track.
