= Brad Oxley =

American speedway rider

- Born: 6 October 1959 (age 67); Lynwood, California, United States

Career history
- 1981–1982: Wimbledon Dons

Individual honours
- 1987: North American Champion
- 1999: USA Champion

Harry Bradley Oxley (born 6 October 1959) is a former speedway rider from the United States. He earned 12 caps for the United States national speedway team.

== Speedway career ==
Oxley became a North American champion after winning the AMA National Speedway Championship in 1987. Twelve years later, he became the United States champion after winning the United States Individual Speedway Championship in 1999.

Oxley rode in the top tier of British Speedway from 1981 to 1982, riding for Wimbledon Dons.
