= Robert Pfetzing =

American speedway rider

- Born: 4 October 1959 (age 67); Santa Ana, California, United States
- Nationality: American

Career history
- 1984, 1987, 1989: Wolverhampton Wolves
- 1988: Bradford Dukes

Individual honours
- 1986: United States National Championships silver
- 1991: United States National Championships bronze

Robert Pfetzing (born 4 October 1959) is an American former international speedway rider. He earned 9 caps for the United States national speedway team.

== Speedway career ==
Pfetzing rode in the top tier of British Speedway from 1984 to 1989, riding for Wolverhampton Wolves and Bradford Dukes.

Pfetzing reached the Overseas final as part of the Speedway World Championship during the 1988 Individual Speedway World Championship and has twice been on the podium at the United States National Championships.
