= 2009 North American Under 21 World Qualifier =

The 2009 North American Under 21 World Qualifier was a motorcycle speedway qualifying tournament held on August 21, 2009, in Auburn, California. The event determined the North American representative for the Individual Speedway Junior World Championship.

== Format ==
The championship was decided by a main event final, rather than by cumulative points from the preliminary rounds. The winner, Bryce Starks, qualified for the Individual Speedway Junior World Championship.

== Results ==
=== Classification ===
Listed in overall finishing order (not by preliminary round points):

Pos.	Rider	Points	Details
1	(United States) Bryce Starks	7	(2,1,2,2)
2	(United States) Jason Ramirez	11	(2,3,3,3)
3	(United States) Russell Green	9	(3,2,1,3)
4	(United States) Alex Marcucci	10	(3,3,2,2)
5	(United States) Philip Harmatiuk	6	(1,2,2,1)
6	(United States) Ben Essary	3	(0,0,3,0)
7	(United States) Gino Manzares	12	(3,3,3,3)
8	(United States) Brad Pappalardo	6	(1,2,1,2)
9	(United States) Michelle Fehrman	3	(2,1,0,0)
10	(United States) Tori Hubbert	2	(0,1,0,1)
11	(United States) Skyler Greyson	2	(0,0,1,1)
12	(United States) Casey Cornilsen	1	(1,0,-,-)
13	(United States) John Gauthreaux	0	(0,0,0,0)

=== Semi-finals ===
Semi-final 1

Pos.	Rider
1	(United States) Russell Green
2	(United States) Bryce Starks
3	(United States) Ben Essary
4	(United States) Gino Manzares

Semi-final 2

Pos.	Rider
1	(United States) Jason Ramirez
2	(United States) Alex Marcucci
3	(United States) Philip Harmatiuk
4	(United States) Brad Pappalardo

=== Final ===
Pos.	Rider
1	(United States) Bryce Starks
2	(United States) Jason Ramirez
3	(United States) Russell Green
4	(United States) Alex Marcucci

== See also ==
- North American Under 21 World Qualifier
- Individual Speedway Junior World Championship
