= 2006 North American Under 21 World Qualifier =

Seasons
- ← 2005 2007 →

The 2006 North American Under 21 World Qualifier, a speedway event held each year to qualify for a spot in the qualifying round of the Individual Speedway Junior World Championship, was held on December 16, 2006, at the City of Industry in California. The event was won by Neil Facchini who thus became US Under-21 National Champion, but he was too old to compete in the world championship of 2007, so it was the second placed rider Dale Facchini who entered for that event.

Pos.	Rider	Points	Details
1	(United States) Neil Facchini (Note: Too old to compete in the World Under 21 Championships Qualifier.)	15	(3,3,3,3,3)
2	(United States) Dale Facchini	12	(2,3,3,2,2)
3	(United States) TJ Fowler (Note: Did not attend the World Under 21 Championships Qualifier.)	12	(3,3,3,2,1)
4	(United States) Kenny Ingalls	11	(2,2,2,3,2)
5	(United States) Dario Galvin	11	(2,3,2,1,3)
6	(United States) Brian Starr	10	(3,0,2,3,2)
7	(United States) Tim Gomez	9	(3,2,F,1,3)
8	(United States) JT Mabry	9	(1,1,3,1,1)
9	(United States) Casey Donholt	7	(1,2,1,0,3)
10	(United States) J.J. Martynse	6	(1,1,2,2,0)
11	(United States) Alex Marcucci	4	(1,0,1,0,2)
12	(United States) John Marquez	4	(0,1,1,2,0)
13	(United States) Travis Henderson	4	(2,2,0,F,0)
14	(United States) Brian Hollenbeck	3	(0,1,1,R,1)
15	(United States) Ronny Woodsford	2	(0,0,0,1,1)
16	(United States) Tori Hubbert	1	(0,0,F,1,0)
