= Mike Bast =

American speedway rider

- Born: 6 January 1953 (age 73); Los Angeles, California, United States
- Nationality: American

Individual honours
- 1971, 1973 1975, 1976 1977, 1978 1979: North American Champion

Michael Joseph Alvin Bast (born 6 January 1953) is a former speedway rider from the United States.

== Speedway career ==
Bast is a seven-time North American champion, winning the AMA National Speedway Championship in 1971, 1973, 1975, 1976, 1977, 1978 and 1979.

== Family ==
Bast's older brother Steve was also a North American speedway champion and his cousin Bart was a US Champion.
