= Steve Bast =

American speedway rider

- Born: 25 December 1951; Van Nuys, Los Angeles, USA
- Died: 30 October 2007 (aged 55); Auburn, California, USA
- Nationality: American

Career history
- 1970: Wembley Lions

Individual honours
- 1969, 1974: North American Champion

Steven Roger Bast (1951–2007) was an international speedway rider from the United States. He earned five caps for the United States national speedway team.

== Speedway career ==
Bast was a two-time North American champion, winning the AMA National Speedway Championship in 1969 and 1974.

Bast rode in the top tier of British Speedway in 1970, riding for the Wembley Lions

== Family ==
Bast's younger brother Mike was a seven-time North American speedway champion and his cousin Bart was a US Champion.
