= Steve Lucero =

Former USA speedway rider

- Born: June 29, 1964 (age 62); San Pablo, California, U.S.
- Nationality: American

Career history
- 1984: Eastbourne Eagles
- 1984: Wolverhampton Wolves

Individual honours
- 1988, 1996: North American Champion

Steve Lucero (born June 29, 1964) is an American former speedway rider. He earned three caps for the United States national speedway team.

== Speedway career ==
Lucero is a two-time North American champion, winning the AMA National Speedway Championship in 1988 and 1996.

Lucero rode in the top tier of British Speedway in 1984, riding for the Eastbourne Eagles and the Wolverhampton Wolves.
