= Bruce Penhall =

American speedway rider

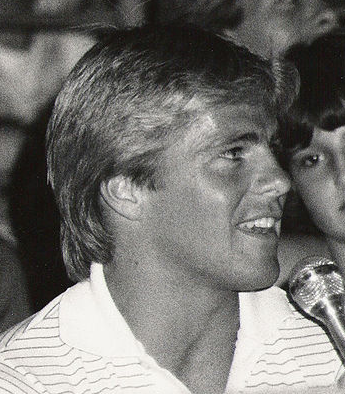
- Bruce Penhall in 1981
- Born: May 10, 1957 (age 69); Balboa Island, California, U.S.

Career history
- 1978-1982: Cradley Heath Heathens

Individual honours
- 1981, 1982: World Champion
- 1980, 1981: North American Champion
- 1981: Intercontinental Champion
- 1978: Skol Masters
- 1979: The Laurels
- 1981, 1982: Yorkshire TV Trophy
- 1981: Blue Riband
- 1981: Brandonapolis

Team honours
- 1981: World Pairs Champion
- 1982: World Team Cup winner
- 1981: British League Champion
- 1979, 1980, 1982: British League Knockout Cup
- 1982: British League Cup
- 1978: British League Pairs Champion
- 1980: Midland Cup

Bruce Lee Penhall (born May 10, 1957) is an American former professional motorcycle speedway racer who later starred in television and in film. He was the World Speedway Champion in 1981 and 1982 and rode for the successful Cradley Heath Heathens speedway team in the United Kingdom. He retired from speedway racing the night he won his second World Championship in 1982 in front of his home crowd at the Los Angeles Memorial Coliseum.

In his relatively short career, Penhall appeared in seven World Finals in all speedway competitions, including riding for the United States in the World Pairs Championship and the World Team Cup. He would win four World Championships in total, adding the 1981 World Pairs and 1982 World Team Cup to his individual titles.

== Speedway career ==
Penhall first rode speedway when he was 16 at Irwindale Raceway on the American west coast. From novice status, he quickly established himself in the US National Championships, twice finishing in the top three positions. In 1976 he toured Israel and in 1977 Australia and New Zealand, before being lured to Cradley Heath Heathens in 1978 by Dan McCormick and Derek Pugh.

On his Dudley Wood debut against Sheffield in a challenge match, Penhall notched just a single point. Never again in his British career would he score less than four for the Heathens. In his second match - his league debut - he scored nine; within a month he clocked double figures and topped the scorechart for the first time with 13; in July he took over as club captain following the departure of Bruce Cribb and hit his first Heathens maximum; and by the end of the year he had achieved a season average of over 9.00 points per match.

In 1979 Penhall won the Master of Speedway competition around Europe, as well as becoming the first American holder of the Golden Helmet match race championship. He was runner-up to John Louis in the British League Riders' Championship and led Cradley to Inter-League Cup success and their highest-ever league position. By 1980 there were more cup victories, along with SWAPA Overseas Rider of the Year, American National Champion, a first World Final appearance (scoring nine points).

Also in 1979, Penhall rode in the World Pairs Championship Final at the Vojens Speedway Center in Denmark. Originally to be partnered by Kelly Moran (the pair had finished second in their semi-final round to qualify) until Moran had to withdraw due to injuries from a practice crash, Steve Gresham was called in as Moran's replacement. However, Gresham was left stranded at the Heathrow Airport in London (as was a hurried third replacement Ron Preston), Penhall was forced to ride the meeting with the reserve riders as teammates. He would score 14 out of a possible 18 points with four wins and two third places to finish in 5th place.

The 1981 season was Penhall's all-conquering year. At the last World Final held at the famous Wembley Stadium, 92,500 people witnessed Penhall come from behind to pip both former World Champion Ole Olsen of Denmark and later another Dane Tommy Knudsen on the finish line. His only loss of the night was finishing second to England's Kenny Carter when he only needed to finish third to clinch the title. Penhall became the first American to win the World Championship since Jack Milne had won the second ever title at Wembley in 1937. As a previous World Championship winner at Wembley, Milne was a special guest of the meeting and saw Penhall break America's 43-year drought.

Also in 1981, Penhall partnered with fellow American Bobby Schwartz to win the World Pairs Championship in Chorzów, Poland, and alongside fellow 1981 World Finalist Erik Gundersen of Denmark (himself a future multiple World Champion), led Cradley all the way to their first ever league title victory, topping the individual league averages on the way. On top of a clean sweep of all the SWAPA personality awards was a special citation from US President Ronald Reagan.

However, Penhall had less than one year left in speedway before moving on, firstly to the world of Hollywood movies and later to powerboat racing (where he would become a world champion again). In 1982 he won the World Team Cup with the USA at the White City Stadium in London.

Penhall caused a stir at the 1982 Overseas Final, also at White City. Heat 19 of the event involved 4 riders from the USA (brothers Kelly and Shawn Moran, Penhall and his childhood friend Dennis Sigalos). Penhall, having already scored enough points to qualify for the World Final, deliberately finished last in the heat (ending his chance of winning the meeting) to allow Kelly Moran and Sigalos to also qualify for the Intercontinental Final in Vetlanda, Sweden. English commentator Dave Lanning called it a circus, but also noted that it wasn't an unprecedented happening, claiming that riders from other nations had previously done similar in order to help their countrymen qualify.

=== 1982 World Final ===
Penhall went on to achieve his one last speedway ambition which was to win the Individual World Final on his home soil in America. He did this by winning his last 4 rides (after finishing 2nd in his first) and finishing with 14 points for the night. He then did what many expected and effectively retired from international speedway on the podium as reigning World Champion.

Heat 14 of the 1982 World Final proved the most controversial of the night. After a slow start which saw Penhall and Kenny Carter in 3rd and 4th places behind 1976 World Champion Peter Collins and Australian Phil Crump, both riders fought their way past Crump and into 2nd and 3rd behind Collins. Carter moved under Penhall into 2nd place at the end of the 2nd lap, and both riders proceeded to bump each other down the front straight with Carter emerging in front. Carter then went wide through turn 1 which allowed Penhall to come back underneath him. Carter then fell coming onto the back straight and went through the fence causing the race to be stopped. Norwegian referee Torrie Kittlesen then excluded Carter from the race for causing the stoppage. Carter protested, claiming that Penhall had hit him in the corner causing him to come off his bike and walked back to the start line in an effort to stop the re-run going ahead without him. Officials and his manager Ivan Mauger were then forced to remove Carter from the track.

Although not shown in the television broadcast of the event, amateur video footage shot from the stands in turns 1 & 2 vindicated Kittlesen's decision. The footage showed that Penhall and Carter did not touch in the turn and that Carter had gone down on his own, though years later the debate still rages on about who was at fault.

Penhall went on to win the re-run from Collins and Crump. In a twist, the result in the re-run ultimately cost Collins' younger brother Les the World Championship in what was his first and only World Final appearance. Had Penhall finished second in Heat 14 behind Peter Collins, and with later results, he and Les Collins could have finished with 13 points each which would have seen the pair in a runoff for the championship. Les Collins had inflicted Penhall's only loss of the meeting when he out-rode the American in Heat 4 in what many believe was a major upset. Additionally, if Penhall had been excluded from Heat 14 and not Carter, Les Collins would likely have won the title as he had finished with 2 point lead over third placed Dennis Sigalos.

== Acting ==
Penhall was well known for his role as Cadet/Officer Bruce Nelson in the final season of the NBC television series CHiPs and in the role of Bruce Christian in the 1989 film Savage Beach and five of the movie's sequels, including Hard Hunted (1993). Penhall reprised his role as Bruce Nelson in the 1998 TNT television movie CHiPs '99 and has made guest appearances on shows such as Just Men!, The Facts of Life and Renegade.

Penhall's debut in CHiPs came in the season 6 episode "Speedway Fever", which mainly concentrated on his character Nelson winning the 1982 World Final at the LA Coliseum. Scenes were shot in the pits in between races and actual footage of the final was shown in the episode.

In 1999, Penhall was inducted into the A.M.A. Motorcycle Hall of Fame. In 2008, he took over as joint promoter, along with Jeffrey Immediato, of speedway racing events at 'The Grand at Industry Hills' race track in City of Industry, California.

== Personal ==
In 1985, Penhall travelled to Sydney, Australia to read the lesson at the funeral of rider Billy Sanders after the Australian champion died by suicide at his home in Ipswich, England. The two riders were close friends and Penhall is the godfather of Sanders' children Dean and Belinda. In a sad twist, Dean Sanders, who was 10 years old and in school just 10 miles from the Sanders' Ipswich home when his father took his own life, would later also die by suicide.

Penhall's son Connor (born 1990) was killed by a drunk driver in 2012 while working on a freeway. Penhall later got a tattoo in memory of his late son. Penhall is still involved with speedway in Southern California and also makes semi-regular appearances at big race meetings in the UK and Europe such as Speedway Grand Prix events.

== Awards ==
Penhall was inducted into the Motorsports Hall of Fame of America in 2011.

== World Final appearances ==
=== Individual World Championship ===
- 1980 - (Sweden) Gothenburg, Ullevi - 5th - 9pts
- 1981 - (England) London, Wembley - Winner - 14pts
- 1982 - (United States) Los Angeles, Memorial Coliseum - Winner - 14pts

=== World Pairs Championship ===
- 1979 - (Denmark) Vojens, Speedway Center (with Kelly Moran*) - 5th - 14pts (14)
- 1981 - (Poland) Chorzów, Silesian Stadium (with Bobby Schwartz) - Winner - 23pts (14)

* Kelly Moran was to have ridden but was injured in practice. Both replacements, Steve Gresham and Ron Preston, were stranded at Heathrow Airport in London due to a pilots strike.

=== World Team Cup ===
- 1980 - (Poland) Wrocław, Olympic Stadium (with Scott Autrey / Dennis Sigalos / Bobby Schwartz / Ron Preston) - 2nd - 29pts (12)
- 1982 - (England) London, White City Stadium (with Kelly Moran / Bobby Schwartz / Shawn Moran / Scott Autrey) - Winner - 34pts (10)

== Filmography ==
Year	Title	Role	Notes
1982–83	CHiPs	Officer Bruce Nelson	18 episodes
1984	The Facts Of Life	Steve Garland	Episode: "All or Nothing"
1985	The Love Boat	Neil Bonhoff	Episode: "Instinct/Unmade for Each Other/BOS"
1986	Body Count	Dave Calloway	Feature film
1988	Picasso Trigger	Hondo	Feature film
1989	Savage Beach	Bruce Christian	Feature film
1990	Guns	Bruce Christian	Feature film
1991	Do or Die	Bruce Christian	Feature film
1993	Hard Hunted	Bruce Christian	Feature film
1993	Fit to Kill	Bruce Christian	Feature film
1993	Enemy Gold	Chris Cannon	Feature film
1994	The Dallas Connection	Chris Cannon	Feature film
1995	Renegade	Donny	Episode: "Offshore Thunder"
1998	CHiPs '99	Sgt. Bruce Nelson	Television film
