= Rick Woods (speedway rider) =

American speedway rider

- Born: June 11, 1948; Newport Beach, California, USA
- Died: September 1, 2012 (aged 64)
- Nationality: American

Career history
- 1973: Newport Wasps

Individual honours
- 1968, 1970, 1972: North American Champion

Rick Woods (June 11, 1948 – September 1, 2012) was an international speedway rider from the United States. He earned three caps for the United States national speedway team.

== Speedway career ==
Woods was a three times North American champion, winning the AMA National Speedway Championship in 1968, 1970 and 1972. He rode in the top tier of British Speedway in 1973, riding for Newport Wasps.
