= Chris Manchester =

American speedway rider

- Born: 28 June 1973 (age 53); Kansas, United States

Career history
- 1994-1997, 1999, 2003: Belle Vue Aces
- 2003: Somerset Rebels

Individual honours
- 1992: North American Champion
- 2000, 2005: United States Champion

Chris Manchester (born 28 June 1973) is a former speedway rider from the United States. He earned 3 caps for the United States national speedway team.

== Speedway career ==
Manchester is a former North American Champion, winning the AMA National Speedway Championship in 1992. He also won the United States Champion in 2000 and 2005.

Manchester rode in the top tier of British Speedway from 1994 until 2003, riding primarily for the Belle Vue Aces but did race one season for Somerset Rebels in 2003.
