= Scott Brant (speedway rider) =

American speedway rider

- Born: December 14, 1968 (age 57); Hayward, California, U.S.

Individual honours
- 2003: USA National Champion
- 2002, 2003: Jack Milne Cup
- 2003: Warren Russel Cup
- 1982, 1984: Northern California Junior Champion

Scott Brant (born 14 December 1968) is an American former professional speedway rider.

== Career ==
Brant is nicknamed "The Dominator". Brant began racing speedway when he was eight years-old. He was the Northern California junior champion in 1982 and 1984. Further success came in the Bruce Penhall Classic in 1993.

The pinnacle of Brant's career was winning the United States Speedway National Championship in 2003. The same year he won the Jack Milne Cup, 25 Lap Classic Winner and Warren Russell Cup.
