= Dillon Ruml =

American speedway rider

- Born: 4 March 1999 (age 27); Orange, California, U.S.

Career history
- 2021: Plymouth Gladiators
- 2022: Oxford Cheetahs

Individual honours
- 2018, 2019: AMA Best Pairs Speedway National Champion

Dillon Ruml (born 4 March 1999) is a speedway rider from the United States.

== Speedway career ==
Ruml was the AMA Best Pairs Speedway National Champion in 2018 and 2019. In 2021, he joined the Plymouth Gladiators for his first season in British speedway, riding in the SGB Championship 2021. In 2022, Ruml signed for the Oxford Cheetahs for the 2022 season. The Cheetahs were returning to action after a 14-year absence from British Speedway. He was named rider of the year for the Cheetahs but was released at the end of the season due to difficulties over the points limit for 2023.

== Family ==
Ruml is the younger brother of fellow Speedway rider Max Ruml.
