= Ricky Wells =

American speedway rider

- Born: 27 July 1991 (age 35); Auckland, New Zealand
- Nationality: New Zealander, American

Career history

Great Britain
- 2009: Coventry Bees
- 2010: Stoke Potters
- 2011–2013, 2015: Wolverhampton Wolves
- 2011: Plymouth Devils
- 2012–2013: Sheffield Tigers
- 2014–2016: Workington Comets
- 2017: Rye House Rockets
- 2017–2019: Edinburgh Monarchs
- 2018: Leicester Lions
- 2019: Belle Vue Aces
- 2019: Poole Pirates
- 2020–2021: Glasgow Tigers
- 2022: Berwick Bandits

Denmark
- 2016: Holstebro

Individual honours
- 2009: USA National Champion
- 2007, 2008: Under 21 National Champion
- 2004, 2005: Youth National Champion
- 2003, 2004, 2006: Gumball Rally Champion
- 2003, 2005: California Youth Champion
- 2007: Fair Derby Champion
- 2008: Victorville Track Champion

Team honours
- 2007, 2008: High Desert Pairs Champion

Ricky Wells (born 27 July 1991 in Auckland, New Zealand), is an American international motorcycle speedway rider. He was the 2009 USA National Champion and a two time U.S. Under 21 National Champion. He has been an international rider for the USA in the Speedway World Cup.

== Career ==
Wells made his first appearance in the World Under 21 Championships in 2008 by winning the 2007 U.S. Under 21 National Championship. He scored nine points in Qualifying Round 1 held in Norden, Germany which qualified him to move onto Semi-Final Round 1 held in Rye House. Only scoring six points which did not qualify him to move onto The Final Round.

Wells came home and won the 2008 U.S. Under 21 National Championship also which placed him in the 2009 World Under 21 Championships. Scoring 9, and beating off Pawel Zmarzlik and Kozza Smith in a race-off, in Qualifying Round 3 held in Rye House Stadium moved him into Semi-Final 2 held in Kumla. In Kumla, Ricky scored 5 and again was in a race-off situation, in which he beat Justin Sedgmen and Patrik Pawlaszczyk to securing a reserve spot in the Final held in Goričan. Through the injury off Przemyslaw Pawlicki, Wells was awarded a place in the main line-up of the Final, where he scored two points, finishing in 16th place, ahead of Ludvig Lindgren.

On 19 September 2009, Wells won the United States Individual Speedway Championship, winning all of his heat races and the main event. The same season Wells rode for Elite League team Coventry Bees and for the Stoke Potters in the Premier League in 2010 on loan from Coventry. In 2011, he rode for the Elite Shield-winning Wolverhampton Wolves team in the Elite League and Plymouth Devils in the Premier. He has remained with Wolves until the end of 2013, while also riding for Sheffield Tigers in the Premier League. In 2018, he signed for Leicester Lions.

In 2020, when the speedway season was cancelled because of the COVID-19 pandemic, Wells worked at Amazon.

In 2022, Wells rode for the Berwick Bandits in the SGB Championship 2022.

== Honours ==
=== World Championships ===
- Team World Championship (Speedway World Cup)
  - 2009 - 4th place in the Qualifying Round 2
- Individual Under-21 World Championship
  - 2008 - 12th placed in the Semi-Final One
  - 2009 - (Croatia) Goričan - 16th place (2 pts)
