= Ryan Fisher =

American speedway rider

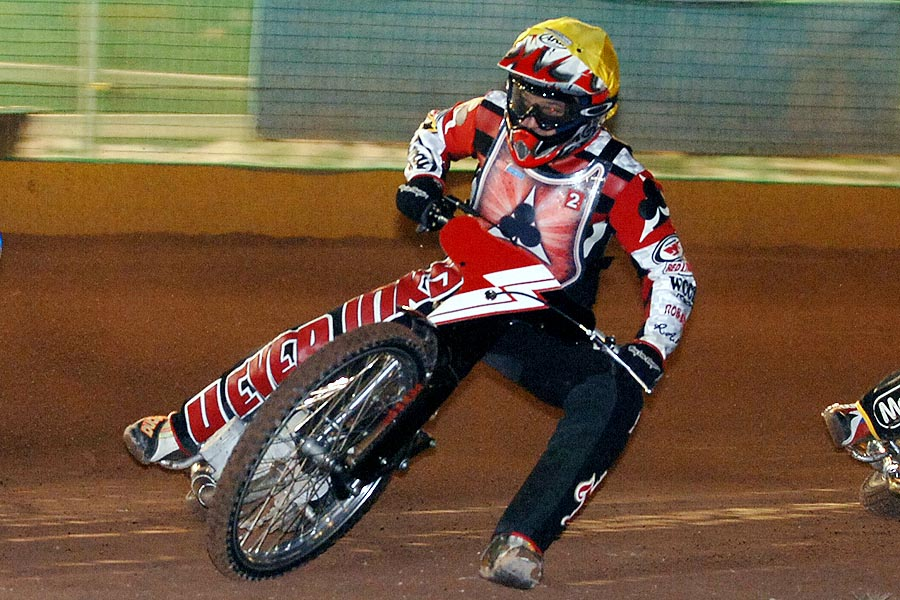
- Fisher riding for Belle Vue in 2007
- Born: 7 September 1983 (age 43); Riverside, California, USA
- Nickname: Flyin' Ryan; The Fish
- Nationality: American

Career history

Great Britain
- 2002–2003, 2011: Coventry Bees
- 2004: Oxford Cheetahs
- 2007: Belle Vue Aces
- 2008–2010, 2016: Edinburgh Monarchs
- 2009: Swindon Robins
- 2012, 2015: Plymouth Devils
- 2013–2014: Peterborough Panthers

Sweden
- 2003: Rospiggarna

Denmark
- 2012: Fjelsted
- 2013: Outrup

Individual honours
- 1996, 1997, 1998: US Junior National Champion
- 1996, 1997: California State Junior Champion

Team honours
- 2003: German Pairs Champion
- 2008, 2010: Premier League Champions
- 2008: Premier Trophy Winners

Ryan Scott Fisher (born 7 September 1983 in Riverside, California) is an American former international motorcycle speedway rider. He earned 8 caps for the United States national speedway team.

== Career ==
Fisher won the US Junior Championship three times before riding in the United Kingdom for Coventry Bees during the 2002 Elite League speedway season. After spending a second season with Coventry, he joined the Oxford Cheetahs in 2004. In between in 2003, he reached the final of the 2003 Speedway Under-21 World Championship.

Fisher did not ride in Britain again until 2007 when he joined the Belle Vue Aces. In 2008, he rode for the Edinburgh Monarchs in the Premier League and the following season doubled up riding for the Edinburgh and Swindon Robins in the Elite League.

In 2011, Fisher moved full-time back into the Elite League, with the Coventry Bees. In 2012, he rode in the Premier League for Plymouth Devils, and has signed to ride for Peterborough Panthers in the Elite League in 2013 and 2014.

Fisher retired from the sport after a final season riding the Edinburgh Monarchs in 2016.
