= Gino Manzares =

American speedway rider (born 1993)

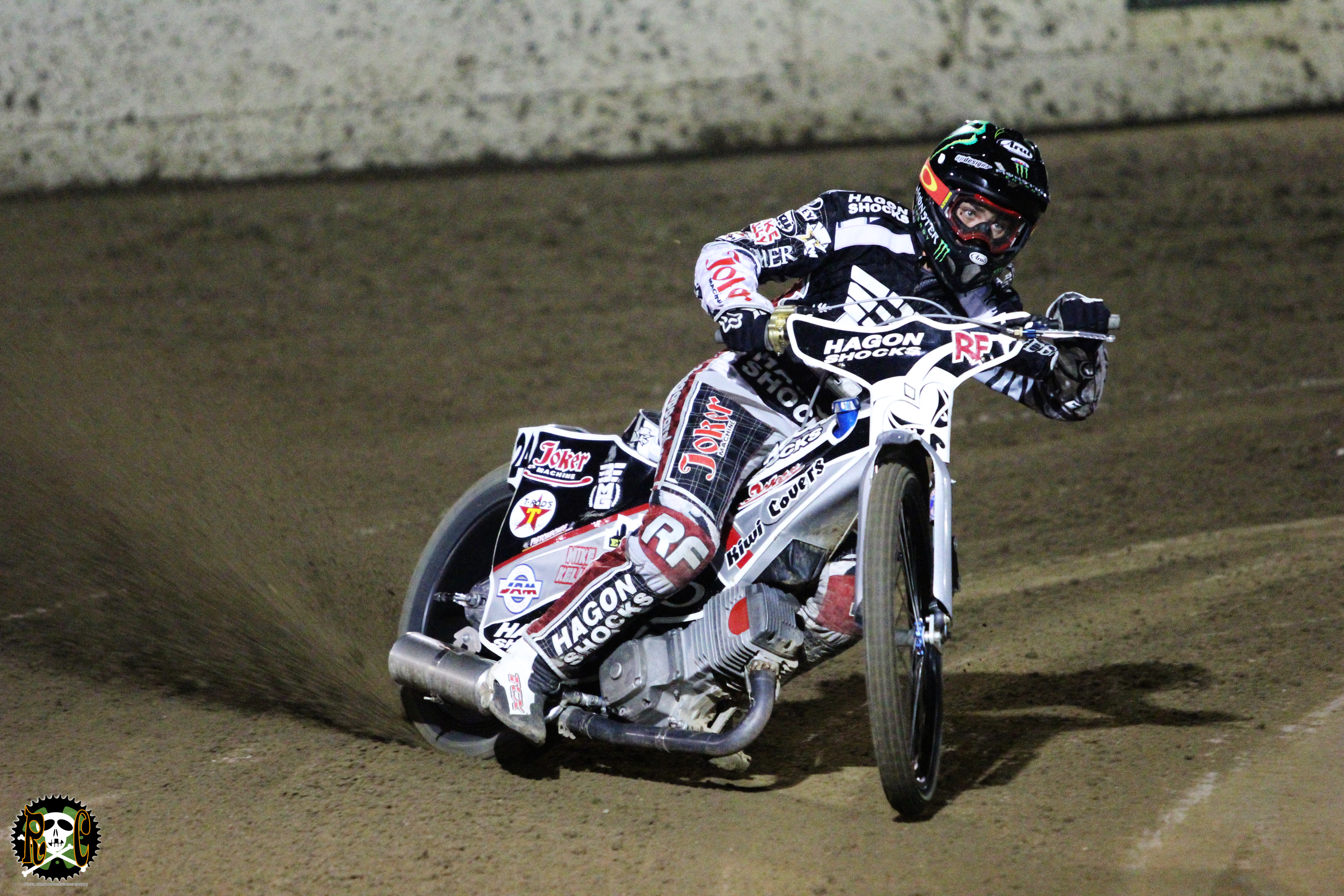
- Born: August 15, 1993 (age 33); Anaheim, California, United States
- Nationality: American (United States)

Career history

Great Britain
- 2014-2015: Ipswich Witches
- 2018: Scunthorpe Scorpions

Sweden
- 2023: Njudungarna
- 2025: Örnarna

Giovanni Manzares (born 15 August 1993) is a speedway rider from the United States.

== Career ==
Manzares has won three medals at the AMA National Speedway Championship, silver in 2021 and two bronze in 2013 and 2019. In addition to this success, he has won the 2013 AMA Speedway Long Track National Championship and 2012 AMA U21 US Speedway National Championship. He also reached the final of the 2014 Speedway Under-21 World Championship.

Manzares began his British racing career riding for Ipswich Witches in the 2014 Premier League speedway season finishing with a 6.02 average. He also competed for Ipswich in 2015, finishing with a 5.43 average. He returned to British speedway in 2018 when he signed for the Scunthorpe Scorpions. In the 2021 North American final, he crashed and suffered serious injuries which included two broken vertebrae, a collapsed lung and fractured hip and pelvis.

Following a long recovery, Manzares returned to racing for the 2023 season signing for Swedish team Elit Vetlanda Speedway and for Örnarna in 2024.
