= Broc Nicol =

American speedway rider

- Born: April 22, 1998 (age 28); Torrance, California, U.S.

Career history
- 2018-2019: Sheffield Tigers
- 2019: King's Lynn Stars
- 2021: Wolverhampton Wolves
- 2021-2022: Glasgow Tigers

Individual honours
- 2017, 2020: United States Champion

Broc Nicol (born April 22, 1998) is a speedway rider from the United States.

== Career ==
Nicol won the United States Championship twice in 2017 and 2020.

Nicol began his British racing career riding for Sheffield Tigers in 2018. The following season, he remained with Sheffield but also rode in the top tier of British Speedway for King's Lynn Stars.

Nicol signed for Glasgow Tigers for the 2020 season but it was cancelled because of the COVID-19 pandemic.

In 2021, Nicol rode for the Wolverhampton Wolves in the SGB Premiership 2021, in addition to the Glasgow Tigers in the SGB Championship 2021. The following season in 2022, he rode for Glasgow again in the SGB Championship 2022.
