= Chris Kerr (speedway rider) =

American speedway rider

- Born: June 28, 1984 (age 42); Auburn, United States
- Nickname: The Tiger

Career history
- 2006-2008: Redcar
- 2007, 2009-2010: Wolverhampton
- 2009: Newport
- 2011: Birmingham

Team honours
- 2007: Young Shield Winner

Christopher Robert Kerr (born 28 June 1984 in Auburn, California) is an American former motorcycle speedway rider. He represented the USA in the 2007 Speedway World Cup. He earned three caps for the United States national speedway team.

== Career ==
Kerr first rode in the United Kingdom when he appeared with the 2005 USA Dream Team tour. He signed with the Redcar Bears in the British 2006 Premier League. In 2009, he rode for the Wolverhampton Wolves in the Elite League and doubled up with the Newport Wasps in the Premier League.

In 2010, Kerr rode for Wolves before one final season in 2011 with Birmingham.
