= Billy Hamill =

American speedway rider

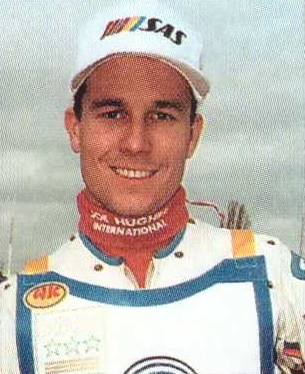
- Born: May 23, 1970 (age 56); Arcadia, California, U.S.

Career history

Great Britain
- 1990–1996: Cradley Heathens
- 1997: Belle Vue Aces
- 1998–2000, 2002–2003: Coventry Bees
- 2005: Oxford Cheetahs
- 2006–2007: Wolverhampton Wolves

Poland
- 1992: Rybnik
- 1994–1995: Gorzów
- 1996–2000, 2004: Grudziądz
- 2001–2003: Zielona Góra

Sweden
- 1991, 1993–2006: Smederna
- 2007: Masarna

Individual honours
- 1996: World Champion
- 1999, 2000, 2001, 2002, 2007, 2012: North American Champion
- 2002, 2007, 2012, 2013: USA Champion
- 1995: Austrian Grand Prix Champion
- 1996: Danish Grand Prix Champion
- 1996: Swedish Grand Prix Champion
- 2000, 2001: Czech Grand Prix Champion
- 2000: European Grand Prix Champion

Team honours
- 1990, 1992, 1993, 1998: World Team Cup Winner
- 2000, 2005: Craven Shield Winner
- 1990: Premiership Winner
- 1995: Premier League Fours Winner
- 1992: Danish League Champion
- 2004: German League Champion
- 2004: Italian League Champion
- 1997, 2002: Polish Div Two Champion

William Gordon Hamill (born 23 May 1970) is an American international motorcycle speedway rider. He is a former Speedway World Champion, winning the title in 1996 and earned 29 caps for the United States national speedway team.

== Career ==
=== Early career ===
Hamill was born on 23 May 1970 in California, United States. He began junior speedway in California in 1983, eventually turning professional in 1986. In 1990, he left California to race for Cradley Heathens in the British League, joining fellow Californian and friend Greg Hancock. In his debut season of racing in Europe, Hamill won his first FIM Gold Medal as the USA won the World Team Cup.

=== 1991–1995 ===
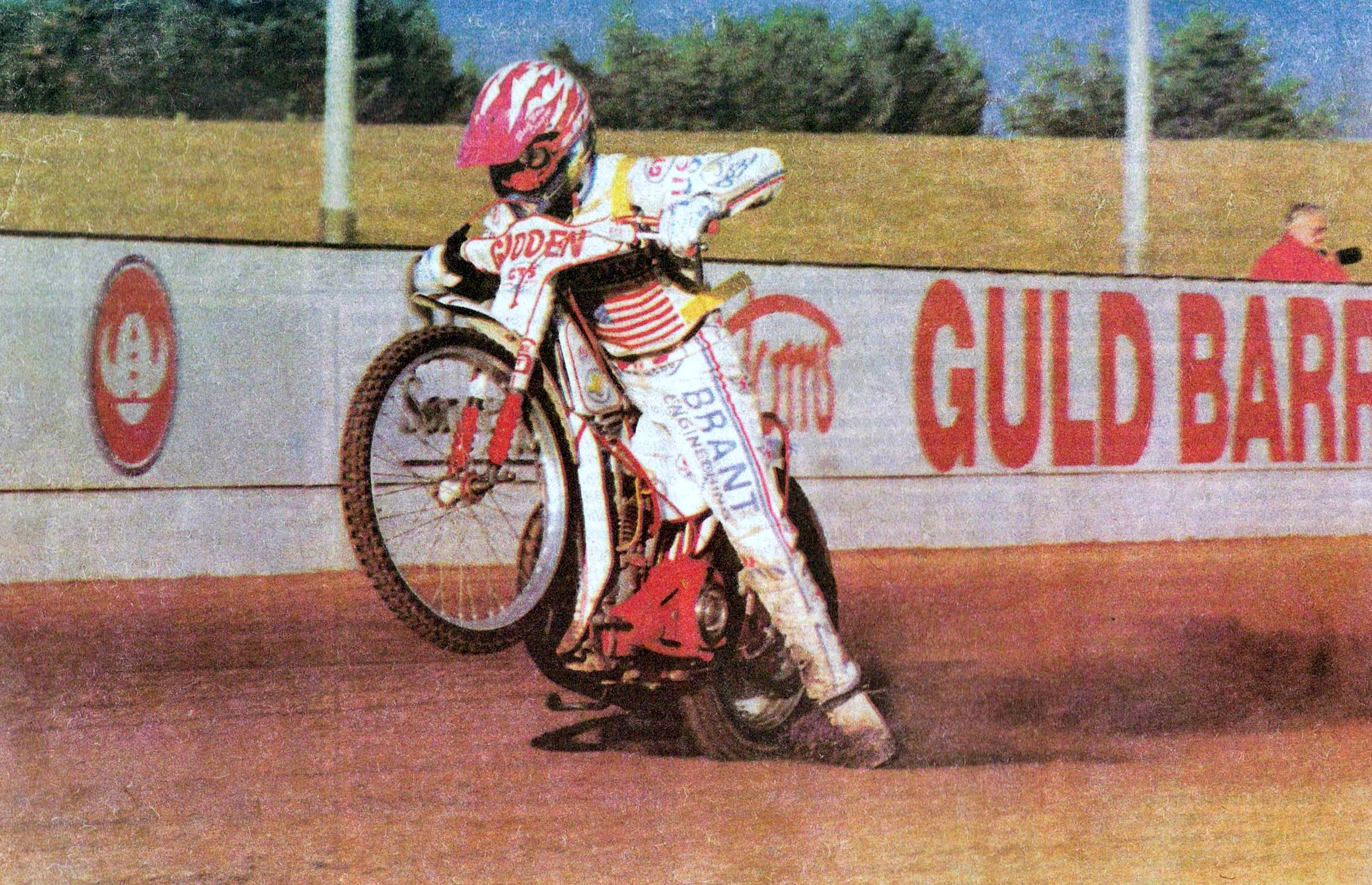
Hamill in 1991

In 1991, Hamill again rode for the Heathens and was named captain and he also made his World Final debut at the Ullevi Stadium in Gothenburg scoring six points. The 1992 World Championship campaign was cut short for Hamill after breaking his wrist at the Overseas final at Coventry's Brandon stadium, however he was still a major part of the Heathens season, again averaging over eight points. He was also part of the USA team which won the world team cup for a second time, in Kumla, Sweden, scoring ten points. 1993 saw a belated return to Cradley for Hamill who went on to make his second world final appearance in Pocking, Germany which was won by fellow American Sam Ermolenko. He once again won the World team Cup as the USA regained their title in Coventry. In 1994, Hamill missed out on a place in the World Final in Vojens, Denmark, losing out in run off at the semi-final stage to Greg Hancock.

1995 saw a change in the Speedway World Championship with a Grand Prix system now in place. As he had only been seeded as first reserve for the series, Hamill only managed two rides in the opening round in Wrocław, Poland. However, he won the second round in Wiener Neustadt, Austria, and eventually finished fifth in the series, won by Denmark's Hans Nielsen. He also finished top of the British League averages in 1995.

=== World title (1996) ===
The 1996 season again saw Hamill riding for the Heathens (though now they were riding at Stoke's Loomer Road stadium as they had been evicted from their Dudley Wood home) and again he topped the British league averages. In the Grand Prix, Hamill joined forces with Cradley teammate Hancock to create Team Exide. Hamill had been the main challenger to defending champion Nielsen all season and went into the final round in Vojens needing to beat the Dane by at least ten points. The odds were stacked in Nielsen's favour riding in his home country, but he could only make the B final, eventually finishing on fourteen points for the evening. Hamill won the A final collecting twenty-five points and therefore becoming USA's fourth Speedway World Champion.

=== 1997–1999 ===
In 1997, Hamill had to leave Cradley Heathens as the team folded, and he joined the Belle Vue Aces in Britain's Elite League. The defence of his World title started off promisingly with a second place in the opening round in Prague behind fellow American and Team Exide race partner Greg Hancock. Unfortunately for Hamill this was to be an indication of how the season was to map out as he trailed his countryman all season to finish with the Silver Medal, as Hancock became the third American World Speedway Champion in five years. Although happy with how he had performed in the defence of his title, Hamill was determined to regain his title in 1998.

The 1998 season saw another new British Elite League team (the Coventry Bees) and another promising start to his Grand Prix campaign finishing second and then third in the opening two rounds. However the latter part of the season Hamill slipped down the Grand Prix placings going into the last round in Bydgoszcz with no chance of claiming the title. Worse was to follow though as Hamill was injured in a controversial collision with Australia's Jason Crump, leaving Hamill nursing a broken back. Ironically with Hamill unable to take part in the rest of the meeting, Crump and Hamill finished level on sixty-two points and Crump snatched the final seeded place for the 1999 Grand Prix series on a countback. The silver lining to the season was a fourth World Team Cup win with team USA, in Vojens Denmark.

Hamill had recovered from his injuries in time for the 1999 campaign although he did not return for Coventry until a month into the season. A change in format for the Grand Prix series from sixteen to twenty-four riders also meant he was granted a seeded place into the series. Hamill struggled after returning injury and found points hard to come by for most of the season. However, in the final round of the Grand Prix, signs of returning to his best were clear as he finished fifth in Vojens and during the Speedway Grand Prix Qualification he won the GP Challenge, which ensured that he claimed a permanent slot for the 2000 Grand Prix.

=== 2000–2002 ===
2000 saw Hamill fully recovered from his back injuries and again challenging the world's best. He won the opening round of the Grand Prix series in Prague and the final round in Bydgoszcz, the very same place where he had suffered his injuries two years previous. He finished the series in second place on ninety-five points, just seven behind eventual champion Mark Loram.

Hamill went into the 2001 season having joined Team Roberts and highly optimistic that he could regain the World Title. But the opening two rounds of the season where both on "temporary" tracks within bigger soccer style stadiums. These man-made tracks did not complement Hamill's style and he picked up only eight out of a possible fifty points. He did have a strong finish to the season winning again in Prague and finishing fourth in Bydgoszcz, yet after such a promising 2000 campaign Hamill was disappointed to finish sixth overall in 2001.

The United States national speedway team had qualified for the 2001 Speedway World Cup Final at the Olympic Stadium in Wrocław, though Hamill originally wasn't part of the team. This changed two days before the final when Sam Ermolenko fell in his final ride of the Race-off and was injured and unable to take his place in the World Cup Final. Hamill answered the call and joined teammates Greg Hancock, Brent Werner, Billy Janniro and John Cook in Poland. Despite having to ride Ermolenko's bike as his own was unavailable, Hamill led the team with 13 points on the night, the US finished fifth and last in the final.

2002 turned out to be Hamill's swansong in the Grand Prix. Five of the tracks in the now ten round series were temporary tracks and he struggled to really challenge the medal positions. A third place in the penultimate round in Vojens showed he could still mix it with the best. Even though he had qualified by right for the 2003 series, he declined the opportunity to take part and the final round in Sydney Australia turned out to be his last ever Grand Prix.

=== 2003–2008 ===
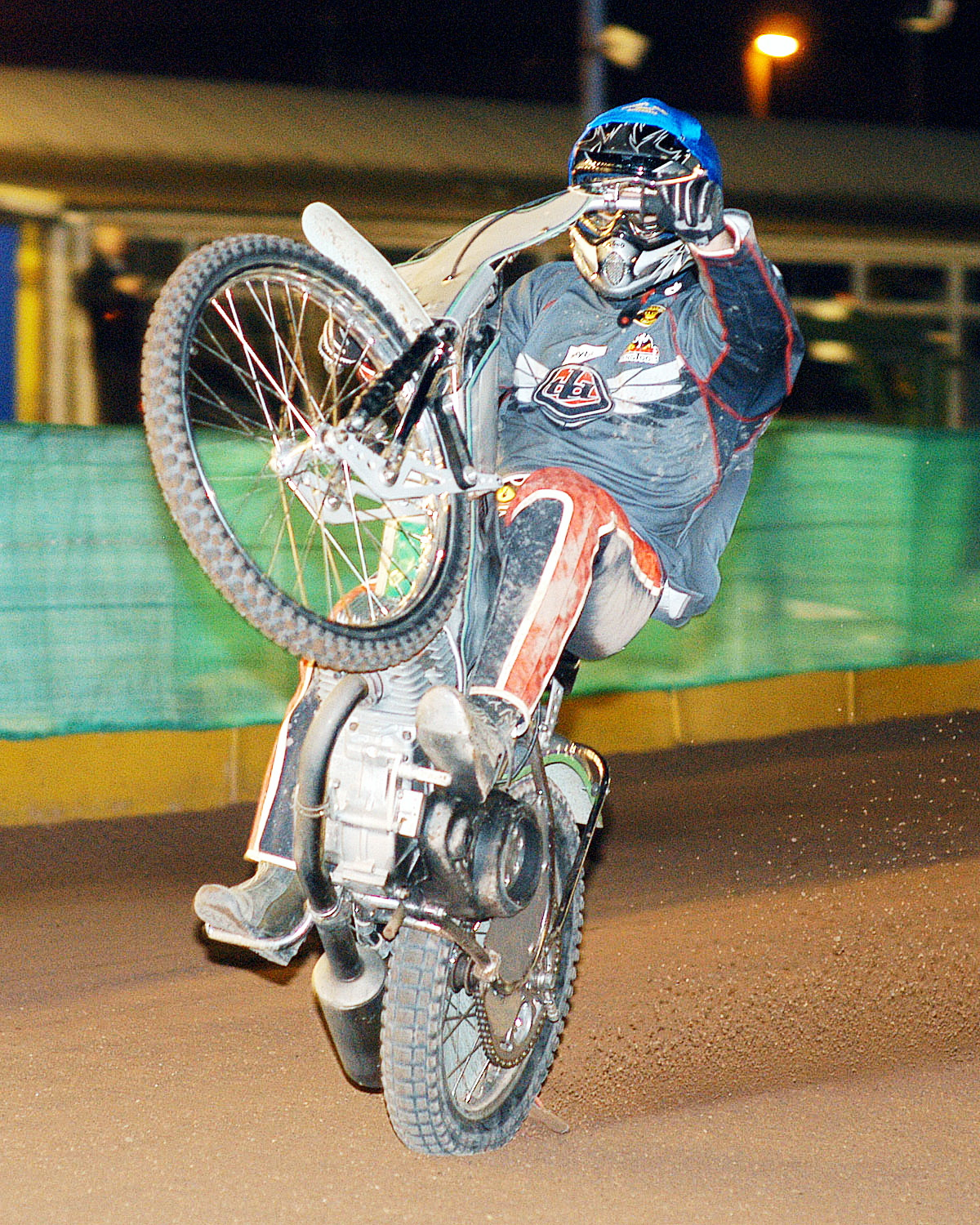
Hamill performs a wheelie at Oxford

After retiring from the Grand Prix series, Hamill concentrated on his league racing in Britain, Sweden and Poland. He rode one more season for the Coventry Bees before moving on to the Oxford Cheetahs and then on to Cradley Heath's bitter rivals the Wolverhampton Wolves in 2006 and 2007.

2007 saw Hamill became USA National Champion for the fifth time, defeating Greg Hancock. Hamill retired from racing in Europe at the end of the 2007 and returned to his home in California. He started racing in the 2008 Californian season but was injured in a race fall and has missed most of the season.

Hamill returned to international competition in 2012, scoring ten points in the USA's victory in the first round of the Speedway World Cup. In September 2012, he became the US champion for the sixth time.

=== USA Team Manager ===
In 2013, Hamill became the Manager of Team USA Speedway and successfully guided the team through to Event 2 of the Monster Energy FIM Speedway World Cup at King's Lynn after topping the scorecard at the qualifying round in Miskolc, Hungary.

Hamill has organised the Gumball Rally for infant through to teenage riders, as well as running the Billy Hamill Speedway Academy, attempting to make USA a dominant force in World Speedway again in the future.

== World final appearances ==
=== Individual World Championship ===
- 1991 – (Sweden) Gothenburg, Ullevi - 12th - 6pts
- 1993 – (Germany) Pocking, Rottalstadion - 10th - 7pts
- 1994 – (Denmark) Vojens, Speedway Center - Reserve - 1pt

=== World Team Cup ===
- 1990 – (Czechoslovakia) Pardubice, Svítkov Stadion - Winner - 37pts (4)
- 1991 – (Denmark) Vojens, Speedway Center - 3rd - 28pts (9)
- 1992 – (Sweden) Kumla, Kumla Speedway - Winner - 39pts (10)
- 1993 – (England) Coventry, Brandon Stadium - Winner - 40pts (10)
- 1994 – (Germany) Brokstedt, Holsteinring Brokstedt - 5th - 17+1pts (0)
- 1995 – (Poland) Bydgoszcz, Polonia Bydgoszcz Stadium - 3rd - 19+3pts (2)
- 1998 – (Denmark) Vojens, Speedway Center - Winner - 28pts (16)
- 1999 – (Czechoslovakia) Pardubice, Svítkov Stadion - 3rd - 29+3pts (6)
- 2000 – (England) Coventry, Brandon Stadium - 3rd - 35pts (10)

=== World Cup ===
- 2001 – (Poland) Wrocław, Olympic Stadium - 5th - 30pts (13)

== Speedway Grand Prix results ==
Year	Position	Points	Best Finish	Notes
1995	5th	80	Winner	Won Austrian Grand Prix
1996	1st	113	Winner	Won Swedish and Danish Grand Prix
1997	2nd	101	2nd	Second in Czech Republic, British and Polish Grand Prix
1998	9th	62	2nd	Second Czech Republic Grand Prix
1999	18th	35	5th	
2000	2nd	95	Winner	Won Czech Republic and Polish Grand Prix
2001	6th	91	Winner	Won Czech Republic Grand Prix
2002	9th	95	4th	
