= Max Ruml =

American speedway rider

- Born: 15 March 1997 (age 29); Orange, California, U.S.

Career history
- 2018: Edinburgh Monarchs

Individual honours
- 2020: North American Champion
- 2021, 2023: USA National Champion

Maxwell Ruml (born 15 March 1997) is a Motorcycle speedway rider from the United States.

== Speedway career ==
Ruml rode in the SGB Championship 2018 of British Speedway in 2018, riding for Edinburgh Monarchs, until his release during July 2018.

Ruml became North American champion in 2020. He then followed it up by winning the USA National Speedway Championship in 2021 and 2023.

Ruml is the older brother of fellow Speedway rider Dillon Ruml.
