= Mike Faria =

American speedway rider

- Born: 4 March 1957 (age 69); Reno, Nevada, U.S.
- Nationality: American

Career history
- 1988: Belle Vue Aces
- 1995: Edinburgh Monarchs
- 1996: Scottish Monarchs

Individual honours
- 1990, 1991, 1997: North American Champion

Mike Faria (born 4 March 1957) is an American former speedway rider. He earned 7 caps for the United States national speedway team.

== Speedway career ==
Faria is a three times North American champion, winning the AMA National Speedway Championship in 1990, 1991 and 1997.

Faria rode in the top tier of British Speedway from 1988 until 1996, riding for various clubs, the first of which was Belle Vue Aces in 1988. Faria remained a Belle Vue asset but signed for Edinburgh Monarchs in 1995.
