= Eddie Castro (speedway rider) =

American speedway rider

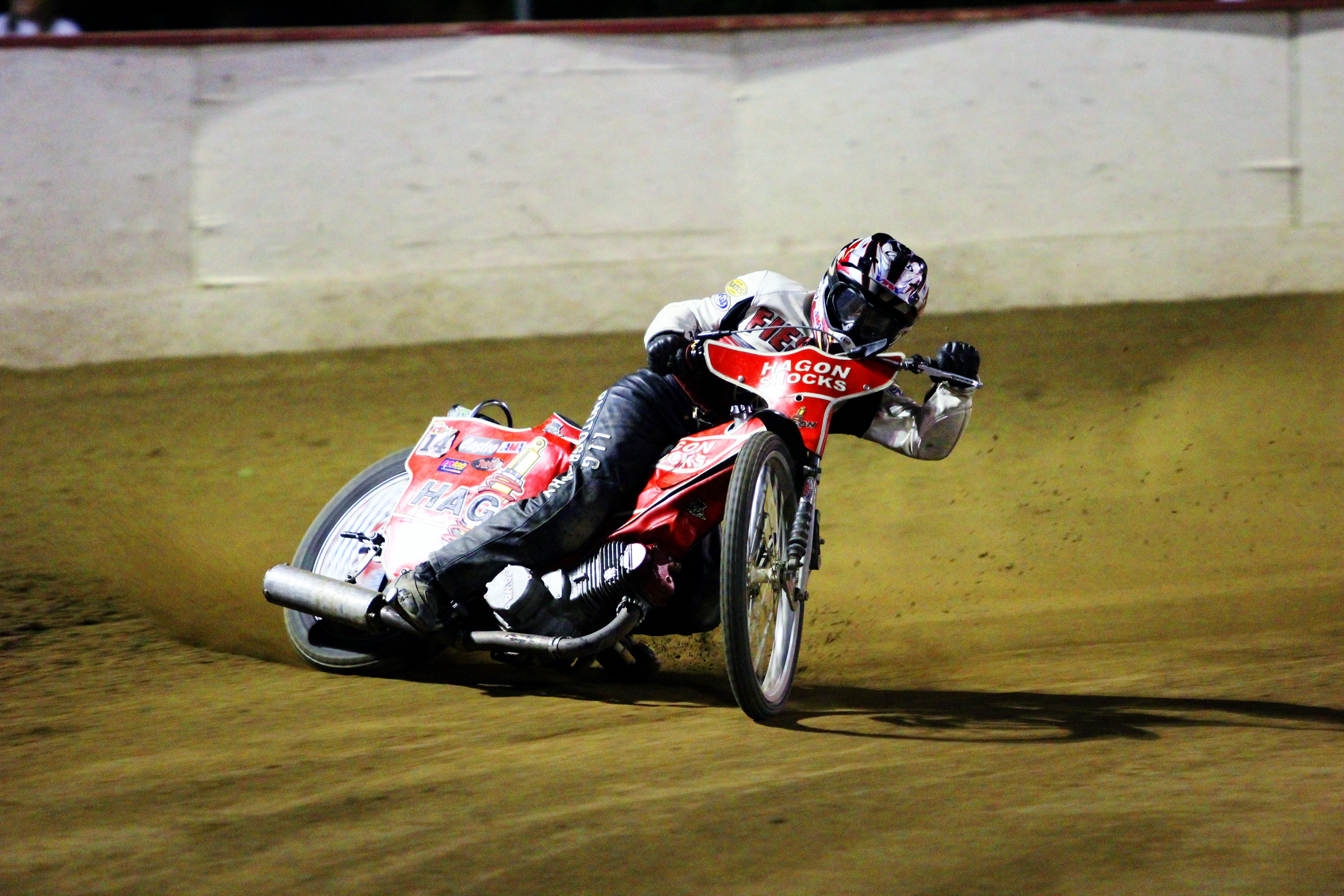
- Castro in 2013
- Born: 24 February 1959 (age 67); Ojai, California
- Nationality: American

Eddie Castro (born in Ojai, California, 24 February 1959), known as 'Fast Eddie', is a former Speedway rider who has raced regularly in the AMA National Speedway Championship, finishing fourth in 2002 (tied with Greg Hancock) and sixth in the 2010 competition.

== Career ==
Castro made his debut in 1980, and has since competed in several prestigious competitions, including the Jack Milne Cup and the Fair Derby, winning the latter in 2009. He also won the Spring Classic handicap in March 1999.

Castro raced in the UK with the Dream Team in 2010, and as captain of the American touring team in 2011.
