= Bobby Schwartz =

American speedway rider

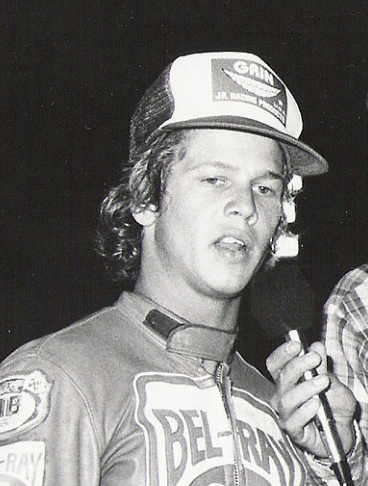
- Born: August 10, 1956 (age 70); Santa Barbara, California, U.S.

Career history
- 1979: Cradley Heathens
- 1980–1983: Reading Racers
- 1984 & 1992: Eastbourne Eagles
- 1985: Wolverhampton Wolves
- 1986: King's Lynn Stars

Individual honours
- 1986, 1989: North American Champion
- 1979, 1982: Blue Riband
- 1979: Daily Mirror Golden Hammer
- 1980: Geoff Curtis Memorial Trophy
- 1985: Littlechild Trophy

Team honours
- 1980: British League Champion
- 1979: KO Cup winner
- 1981, 1982: World Pairs Champion
- 1982: Speedway World Team Cup Winner

Robert Benjamin Schwartz (born August 10, 1956) is an American professional motorcycle speedway rider. He became World Pairs Champion with Bruce Penhall in 1981 and Dennis Sigalos in 1982. He earned 74 caps for the United States national speedway team.

== Career ==
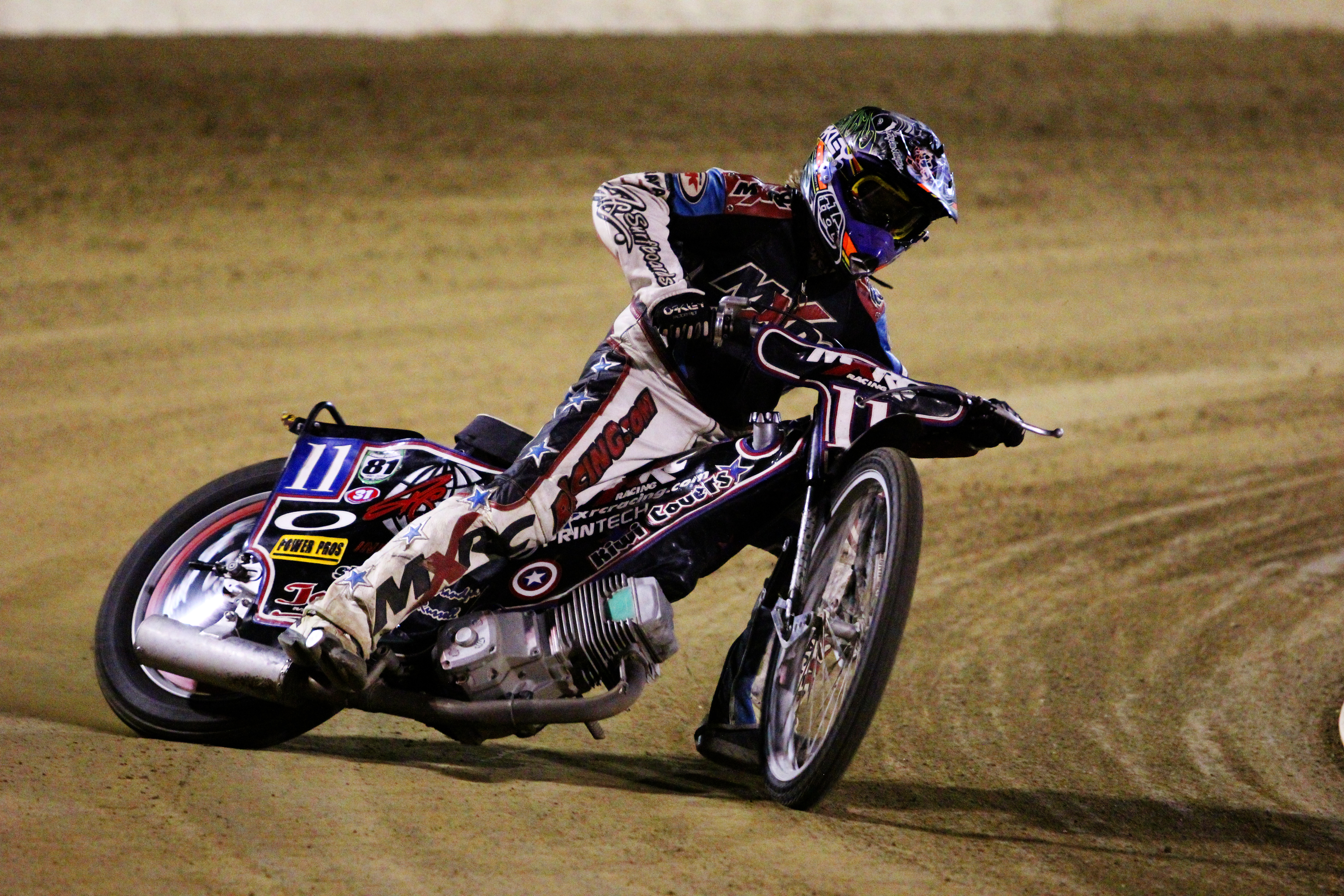
Schwartz in action

Born in Santa Barbara, California, Schwartz was introduced to speedway by the boss of his local bike shop, ex-rider Sonny Nutter. His father bought him a Jawa motorcycle for his 17th birthday and he was soon progressing around the Irwindale Raceway in California.

It took a few years before Schwartz was persuaded to come to England though, despite many approaches. He came with a sparkling reputation as one of America's brightest young stars, and that was enhanced by the recommendation by none other than Bruce Penhall. He finally came to ride in England for Cradley Heath Heathens during the 1979 British League season.

After reaching the 1979 Intercontinental final at the White City Stadium, Schwartz progressed from novice British league reserve to an out and out heatleader who was regularly competing with and beating the very best. It was all no surprise though, after he scored 11 points from four rides in his Dudley Wood debut meeting. There followed a successful partnership with his friend, Penhall, as the two knew each other's track style almost as well as they knew their own. He helped Cradley win the British League Knockout Cup in his first season with them.

Schwartz left Cradley to join Reading Racers for the 1980 British League season, a season in which Reading won the league title. After riding for Wolverhampton Wolves in 1985, he refused to take a pay cut for the 1986 season and left to join King's Lynn Stars.

Schwartz, together with Penhall on the 1981 World pairs title and Schwartz repeated this with a different partner, Dennis Sigalos in 1982. He also won the World team Cup with the US team in 1982. He was US team captain from 1983 to 1987 and US National Champion in 1986 and 1989.

Schwartz continues to ride in the US to this day. He has regularly competed on the tiny Californian circuits.

== World Final appearances ==
=== World Pairs Championship ===
- 1981 - (Poland) Chorzów, Silesian Stadium (with Bruce Penhall) – Winner – 23pts (9)
- 1982 - (Australia) Sydney, Liverpool City Raceway (with Dennis Sigalos) – Winner – 30pts (12)
- 1983 - (Sweden) Gothenburg, Ullevi (with Dennis Sigalos) – 4th – 18pts (8)
- 1984 - (Italy) Lonigo, Santa Marina Stadium (with Shawn Moran) – 4th – 19pts (11)
- 1985 - (Poland) Rybnik, Rybnik Municipal Stadium (with Shawn Moran) – 3rd – 22pts (11)

=== World Team Cup ===
- 1980 - (Poland) Wrocław, Olympic Stadium (with Bruce Penhall / Scott Autrey / Dennis Sigalos / Ron Preston) – 2nd – 29pts (3)
- 1982 - (England) London, White City (with Bruce Penhall / Kelly Moran / Shawn Moran / Scott Autrey) – Winner – 37pts (9)
- 1983 - (Denmark) Vojens, Speedway Center (with Dennis Sigalos / Lance King / Kelly Moran) – 3rd – 27pts (6)
- 1984 - (Poland) Leszno, Alfred Smoczyk Stadium (with Shawn Moran / Kelly Moran / Lance King / John Cook) – 3rd – 20pts (2)
- 1985 - (United States) Long Beach, Veterans Memorial Stadium (with Shawn Moran / John Cook / Lance King / Sam Ermolenko) – 2nd – 35pts (11)
- 1986 - (Sweden) Gothenburg, Ullevi, (Denmark) Vojens, Speedway Center, (England) Bradford, Odsal Stadium (with Shawn Moran / Sam Ermolenko / Lance King / Rick Miller) - 2nd - 76pts (5)
