= Charlie Venegas =

American speedway rider

- Born: February 12, 1967 (age 59); Vallejo, California, U.S.

Career history

Great Britain
- 1996: Long Eaton Invaders
- 1996–1997: Belle Vue Aces

Individual honours
- 2000, 2006: USA National Champion
- 2000, 2006: Jack Milne Cup
- 1993, 1994, 1995: USA Ice Champion
- 1991, 1994, 1995, 1998: Indoor Ice Race World Champion

Team honours
- 1993, 1994, 1995: Indoor Ice World Cup

Charlie Venegas (born February 12, 1967) is an American professional speedway rider. He represented the United States national speedway team in the 2007 Speedway World Cup

== Career ==
Venegas has been USA National Champion twice and has been successful at ice speedway, becoming Indoor Ice Race World Champion four times and lifting the Indoor Ice World Cup three times with USA.

In 1996, Venegas signed for Long Eaton Invaders to ride in the British leagues. Later during the same season he signed for Belle Vue Aces on loan.
