= Bart Bast =

American speedway rider

- Born: 4 June 1967 (age 59); California, United States

Career history
- 1989: Swindon Robins

Individual honours
- 1998: USA Champion

Barton Peter Bast (born 4 June 1967) is a former speedway rider from the United States. He earned three caps for the United States national speedway team.

== Speedway career ==
Bast became the United States champion in 1998 after winning the United States Individual Speedway Championship.

Bast rode in the top tier of British Speedway in 1989, riding for the Swindon Robins. During the same season he had initially been refused a work permit following an attempt by Wolverhampton Wolves to sign him.

== Family ==
Bast's cousins Mike and Steve were both North American champions.
