= Billy Janniro =

American speedway rider

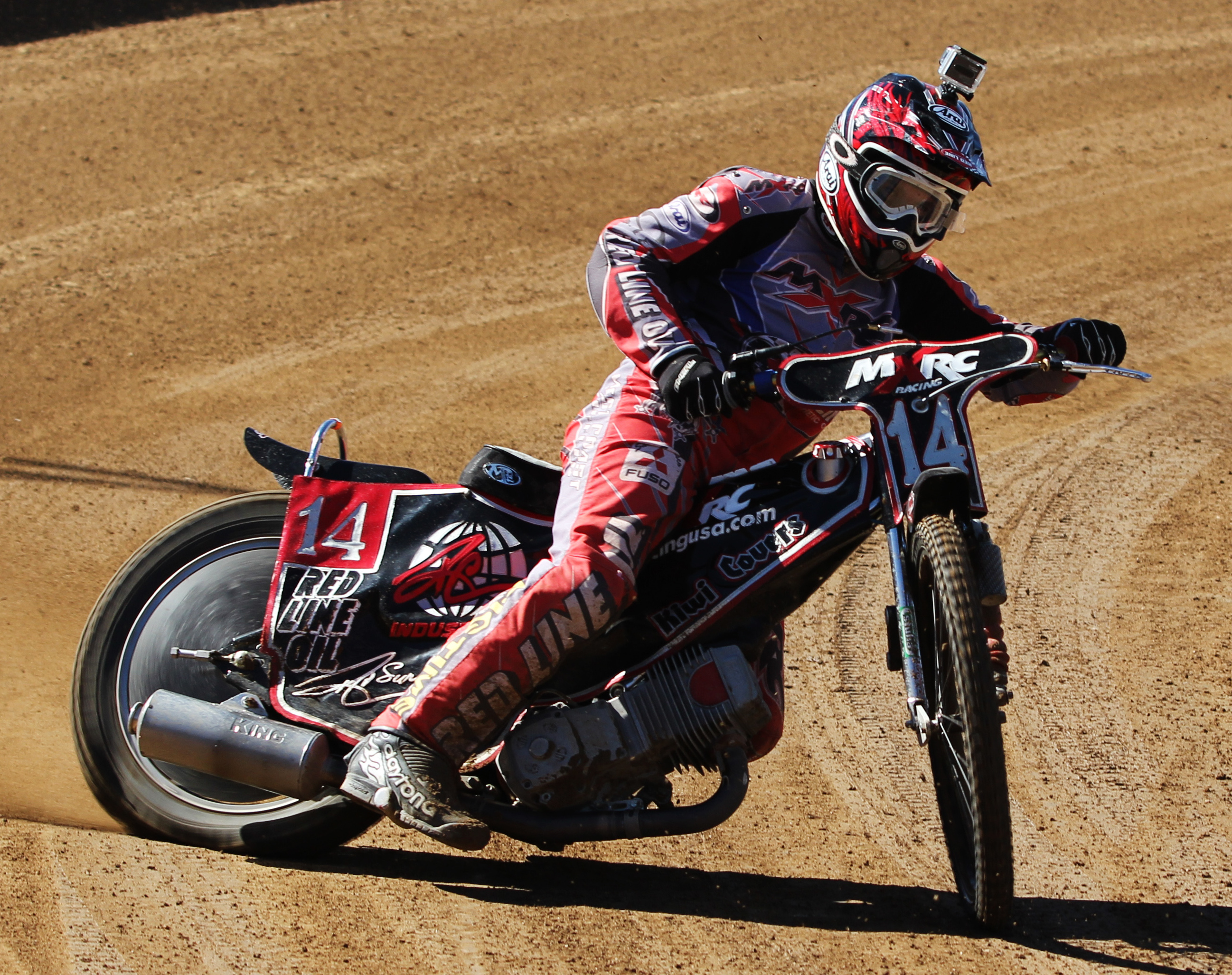
- Born: July 3, 1980 (age 46); Benicia, United States
- Nickname: The Kid

Career history

Great Britain
- 2001-2008: Coventry Bees
- 2005: Peterborough Panthers

Poland
- 2003: Zielona Góra

Sweden
- 2003: Valsarna
- 2004: Smederna

Individual honours
- 2008, 2010, 2011 2013, 2014, 2015 2016, 2017, 2018 2019: North American Champion
- 2004, 2008, 2010 2011, 2018, 2019: USA Champion
- 2009: California Long Track Champion
- 2010, 2011, 2012 2017: California State Champion

Team honours
- 2005, 2007: Elite League Champion
- 2006, 2007: Elite League KO Cup Winner
- 2007, 2008: Craven Shield Winner

Billy Mitchell Janniro (born 30 July 1980 in Benicia, California, United States) is a former motorcycle speedway rider from the United States. He earned 11 caps for the United States national speedway team.

== Career ==
Billy "The Kid" Janniro first rode in the British leagues for the Coventry Bees in 2001. He rode for Coventry for eight seasons but did also have one season with Peterborough Panthers.

Janniro also represented the US in the 2001 Speedway World Cup Final at the Olympic Stadium in Wrocław, Poland.

Janniro is a ten-time winner of the AMA National Speedway Championship, having won the title in 2008, 2010, 2011, 2013, 2014, 2015, 2016, 2017, 2018 and 2019 and a six times USA Champion. He is also a five-time winner of the California State Championship 2010, 2011, 2012, 2014, 2017 and winner - Longtrack Championship in 2009.

Janniro won the Elite League with Coventry in 2005 and 2007, the Elite League Knockout Cup in 2006 and 2007 with the Bees and the Craven Shield in 2007 and 2008.

== World Final Appearances ==
=== Speedway World Cup ===
- 2001 - (Poland) Wrocław, Olympic Stadium - 5th - 30pts (1)
