= Soviet Union national speedway team =

Soviet Union national motorcycle speedway team

Soviet Union
- SWC Wins: 0 Best result World Cup silver medal (1964, 1966, 1971, 1972, 1975)

The Soviet Union national speedway team were one of the leading nations who competed in international team motorcycle speedway.

== History ==
The Soviet Union speedway team (which consisted predominantly of Russian riders but also Ukrainian, Latvian and Belarus riders) first competed in the 1961 edition of the Speedway World Team Cup, where they finished second in the East European round. Throughout the history of World Team Cup, the team were regular World Cup contenders from 1961 until their final World Cup in 1983. They reached the final on 12 occasions, winning the silver medal five times, in 1964, 1966, 1971, 1972, 1975 and the bronze medals three times, in 1967, 1969 and 1973.

The team also reached the final of the Speedway World Pairs Championship in 1973 and 1974.

Following the Dissolution of the Soviet Union at the end of 1991, the riders then competed for their new speedway nations of the Russia, Ukraine and Latvia.

== Major world finals ==
=== World team Cup ===
Year	Venue	Standings (Pts)	Riders	Pts
1964	(West Germany); Abensberg; Abensberg Speedwaystadion	1. Sweden (34); 2. Soviet Union (25); 3. (United Kingdom) Great Britain (21); 4. Poland (16)	Igor Plekhanov	8
1964	(West Germany); Abensberg; Abensberg Speedwaystadion	1. Sweden (34); 2. Soviet Union (25); 3. (United Kingdom) Great Britain (21); 4. Poland (16)	Gennady Kurilenko	8
1964	(West Germany); Abensberg; Abensberg Speedwaystadion	1. Sweden (34); 2. Soviet Union (25); 3. (United Kingdom) Great Britain (21); 4. Poland (16)	Yuri Chekranov	6
1964	(West Germany); Abensberg; Abensberg Speedwaystadion	1. Sweden (34); 2. Soviet Union (25); 3. (United Kingdom) Great Britain (21); 4. Poland (16)	Boris Samorodov	3
1965	(West Germany); Kempten; Kempten Speedway	1. Poland (38); 2. Sweden (34); 3. (United Kingdom) Great Britain (18); 4. Soviet Union (7)	Gennady Kurilenko	2
1965	(West Germany); Kempten; Kempten Speedway	1. Poland (38); 2. Sweden (34); 3. (United Kingdom) Great Britain (18); 4. Soviet Union (7)	Yuri Chekranov	2
1965	(West Germany); Kempten; Kempten Speedway	1. Poland (38); 2. Sweden (34); 3. (United Kingdom) Great Britain (18); 4. Soviet Union (7)	Vladimir Sokolov	2
1965	(West Germany); Kempten; Kempten Speedway	1. Poland (38); 2. Sweden (34); 3. (United Kingdom) Great Britain (18); 4. Soviet Union (7)	Igor Plekhanov	1
1965	(West Germany); Kempten; Kempten Speedway	1. Poland (38); 2. Sweden (34); 3. (United Kingdom) Great Britain (18); 4. Soviet Union (7)	Viktor Trofimov	0
1966	(Poland); Wrocław; Stadion Olimpijski	1. Poland (40); 2. Soviet Union (26); 3. Sweden (22); 4. (United Kingdom) Great Britain (8)	Boris Samorodov	10
1966	(Poland); Wrocław; Stadion Olimpijski	1. Poland (40); 2. Soviet Union (26); 3. Sweden (22); 4. (United Kingdom) Great Britain (8)	Igor Plekhanov	6
1966	(Poland); Wrocław; Stadion Olimpijski	1. Poland (40); 2. Soviet Union (26); 3. Sweden (22); 4. (United Kingdom) Great Britain (8)	Viktor Trofimov	6
1966	(Poland); Wrocław; Stadion Olimpijski	1. Poland (40); 2. Soviet Union (26); 3. Sweden (22); 4. (United Kingdom) Great Britain (8)	Farid Szajnurov	4
1967	(Sweden); Malmö; Malmö Stadion	1. Sweden (32); 2. Poland (26); 3. (United Kingdom) Great Britain (19); 4. Soviet Union (19)	Igor Plekhanov	9
1967	(Sweden); Malmö; Malmö Stadion	1. Sweden (32); 2. Poland (26); 3. (United Kingdom) Great Britain (19); 4. Soviet Union (19)	Viktor Trofimov	4
1967	(Sweden); Malmö; Malmö Stadion	1. Sweden (32); 2. Poland (26); 3. (United Kingdom) Great Britain (19); 4. Soviet Union (19)	Boris Samorodov	3
1967	(Sweden); Malmö; Malmö Stadion	1. Sweden (32); 2. Poland (26); 3. (United Kingdom) Great Britain (19); 4. Soviet Union (19)	Gabdrakhman Kadyrov	2
1967	(Sweden); Malmö; Malmö Stadion	1. Sweden (32); 2. Poland (26); 3. (United Kingdom) Great Britain (19); 4. Soviet Union (19)	Farid Szajnurov	1
1969	(Poland); Rybnik; Rybnik Municipal Stadium	1. Poland (31); 2. (United Kingdom) Great Britain (23); 3. Soviet Union (23); 4. Sweden (12)	Vladimir Smirnov	9
1969	(Poland); Rybnik; Rybnik Municipal Stadium	1. Poland (31); 2. (United Kingdom) Great Britain (23); 3. Soviet Union (23); 4. Sweden (12)	Gennady Kurilenko	8
1969	(Poland); Rybnik; Rybnik Municipal Stadium	1. Poland (31); 2. (United Kingdom) Great Britain (23); 3. Soviet Union (23); 4. Sweden (12)	Valeri Klementiev	5
1969	(Poland); Rybnik; Rybnik Municipal Stadium	1. Poland (31); 2. (United Kingdom) Great Britain (23); 3. Soviet Union (23); 4. Sweden (12)	Yury Dubinin	1
1969	(Poland); Rybnik; Rybnik Municipal Stadium	1. Poland (31); 2. (United Kingdom) Great Britain (23); 3. Soviet Union (23); 4. Sweden (12)	Viktor Trofimov	0
1971	(Poland); Wrocław; Stadion Olimpijski	1. (United Kingdom) Great Britain (37); 2. Soviet Union (22); 3. Poland (19); 4. Sweden (18)	Grigory Khlinovsky	8
1971	(Poland); Wrocław; Stadion Olimpijski	1. (United Kingdom) Great Britain (37); 2. Soviet Union (22); 3. Poland (19); 4. Sweden (18)	Vladimir Smirnov	7
1971	(Poland); Wrocław; Stadion Olimpijski	1. (United Kingdom) Great Britain (37); 2. Soviet Union (22); 3. Poland (19); 4. Sweden (18)	Vladimir Gordeev	4
1971	(Poland); Wrocław; Stadion Olimpijski	1. (United Kingdom) Great Britain (37); 2. Soviet Union (22); 3. Poland (19); 4. Sweden (18)	Anatoly Kuzmin	3
1972	(West Germany); Olching; Olching Speedwaybahn	1. (United Kingdom) Great Britain (36); 2. Soviet Union (21); 3. Poland (21); 4. Sweden (18)	Anatoly Kuzmin	6
1972	(West Germany); Olching; Olching Speedwaybahn	1. (United Kingdom) Great Britain (36); 2. Soviet Union (21); 3. Poland (21); 4. Sweden (18)	Viktor Trofimov	5
1972	(West Germany); Olching; Olching Speedwaybahn	1. (United Kingdom) Great Britain (36); 2. Soviet Union (21); 3. Poland (21); 4. Sweden (18)	Viktor Kalmykov	5
1972	(West Germany); Olching; Olching Speedwaybahn	1. (United Kingdom) Great Britain (36); 2. Soviet Union (21); 3. Poland (21); 4. Sweden (18)	Grigory Khlinovsky	5
1973	(England); London; Wembley	1. (United Kingdom) Great Britain (37); 2. Sweden (31); 3. Soviet Union (20); 4. Poland (8)	Valery Gordeev	7
1973	(England); London; Wembley	1. (United Kingdom) Great Britain (37); 2. Sweden (31); 3. Soviet Union (20); 4. Poland (8)	Vladimir Paznikov	5
1973	(England); London; Wembley	1. (United Kingdom) Great Britain (37); 2. Sweden (31); 3. Soviet Union (20); 4. Poland (8)	Grigory Khlinovsky	4
1973	(England); London; Wembley	1. (United Kingdom) Great Britain (37); 2. Sweden (31); 3. Soviet Union (20); 4. Poland (8)	Aleksandr Pavlov	2
1973	(England); London; Wembley	1. (United Kingdom) Great Britain (37); 2. Sweden (31); 3. Soviet Union (20); 4. Poland (8)	Viktor Trofimov	2
1974	(Poland); Chorzów; Silesian Stadium	1. England (42); 2. Sweden (31); 3. Poland (13); 4. Soviet Union (10)	Mikhail Krasnov	5
1974	(Poland); Chorzów; Silesian Stadium	1. England (42); 2. Sweden (31); 3. Poland (13); 4. Soviet Union (10)	Valery Gordeev	4
1974	(Poland); Chorzów; Silesian Stadium	1. England (42); 2. Sweden (31); 3. Poland (13); 4. Soviet Union (10)	Viktor Kalmykov	1
1974	(Poland); Chorzów; Silesian Stadium	1. England (42); 2. Sweden (31); 3. Poland (13); 4. Soviet Union (10)	Anatoly Kuzmin	0
1975	(West Germany); Norden; Motodrom Halbemond	1. England (41); 2. Soviet Union (29); 3. Sweden (16); 4. Poland (9)	Valery Gordeev	8
1975	(West Germany); Norden; Motodrom Halbemond	1. England (41); 2. Soviet Union (29); 3. Sweden (16); 4. Poland (9)	Grigory Khlinovsky	8
1975	(West Germany); Norden; Motodrom Halbemond	1. England (41); 2. Soviet Union (29); 3. Sweden (16); 4. Poland (9)	Viktor Trofimov	8
1975	(West Germany); Norden; Motodrom Halbemond	1. England (41); 2. Soviet Union (29); 3. Sweden (16); 4. Poland (9)	Vladimir Gordeev	5
1976	(England); London; White City Stadium	1. Australia (31); 2. Poland (28); 3. Sweden (26); 4. Soviet Union (11)	Valery Gordeev	5
1976	(England); London; White City Stadium	1. Australia (31); 2. Poland (28); 3. Sweden (26); 4. Soviet Union (11)	Grigory Khlinovsky	2
1976	(England); London; White City Stadium	1. Australia (31); 2. Poland (28); 3. Sweden (26); 4. Soviet Union (11)	Vladimir Gordeev	2
1976	(England); London; White City Stadium	1. Australia (31); 2. Poland (28); 3. Sweden (26); 4. Soviet Union (11)	Vladimir Paznikov	2
1976	(England); London; White City Stadium	1. Australia (31); 2. Poland (28); 3. Sweden (26); 4. Soviet Union (11)	Viktor Trofimov	0
1981	(West Germany); Olching; Olching Speedwaybahn	1. Denmark (36); 2. England (29); 3. West Germany (28); 4. Soviet Union (3)	Viktor Kuznetsov	2
1981	(West Germany); Olching; Olching Speedwaybahn	1. Denmark (36); 2. England (29); 3. West Germany (28); 4. Soviet Union (3)	Nikolay Kornev	1
1981	(West Germany); Olching; Olching Speedwaybahn	1. Denmark (36); 2. England (29); 3. West Germany (28); 4. Soviet Union (3)	Anatoly Maksimov	0
1981	(West Germany); Olching; Olching Speedwaybahn	1. Denmark (36); 2. England (29); 3. West Germany (28); 4. Soviet Union (3)	Mikhail Starostin	0
1981	(West Germany); Olching; Olching Speedwaybahn	1. Denmark (36); 2. England (29); 3. West Germany (28); 4. Soviet Union (3)	Valery Gordeev	0

=== World Pairs finals ===
- 1973 (4th)
- 1974 (6th)

== International caps ==
Since the advent of the Speedway Grand Prix era, international caps earned by riders is largely restricted to international competitions, whereas previously test matches between two teams were a regular occurrence.

Rider	Caps
Aas, Rene (E)	5
Chekranov, Yuri	
Drobyazko, Leonid	
Dubinin, Yury	
Dyuzhev, Sergey	
Gordeev, Valery	
Gordeev, Vladimir (G)	
Kadyrov, Gabdrakhman	
Kalmykov, Viktor	
Khlinovsky, Grigory (U)	
Klementiev, Valeri	
Kornev, Nikolay	
Krasnov, Mikhail	
Kurilenko, Gennady (U)	
Kuzmin, Anatoly	
Kuznetsov, Viktor	
Maksimov, Anatoly	
Nerytov, Vsevolod	
Pavlov, Aleksandr	
Paznikov, Vladimir	
Plekhanov, Igor	
Rozhanchuk, Vladimir	
Saitgareev, Rif	
Samorodov, Boris	
Shilo, Viktor	
Smirnov, Vladimir	
Sokolov, Vladimir (U)z	
Starostin, Mikhail	
Szajnurov, Farid	
Trofimov, Vladimir (U)	
Trofimov, Viktor	

Key

- Russian unless stated
- (E) - Estonian
- (G) - Georgian
- (L) - Latvian
- (U) - Ukrainian
