= 1965 Individual Speedway World Championship =

Motorcycle speedway world championship season

1965 Speedway World Championship

Seasons
- ← 1964 1966 →

The 1965 Individual Speedway World Championship was the 20th edition of the official World Championship to determine the world champion rider.

Björn Knutson won the world title scoring 14 points out of a possible 15 in the final at Wembley with Russian Igor Plekhanov defeating four times champion Ove Fundin in the silver medal run-off.

== First round ==
Qualification results.

=== Norwegian qualifying ===
- 25 October 1964
- (Norway) Kadettangen, Sandvika
- Top 5 (+2 seeded) to Nordic qualification 1965

Pos.	Rider	Points
1	Sverre Harrfeldt	15
2	Nils Paulsen	13
3	Per Jakob Aulie	13
4	Knut Syrrist	12
5	Henry Harrfeldt	10
6	Bjarne Sorenby	9
7	Thorbjorn Aulie	7
8	Thorbjorn Nygaard	7
9	Ivar A. Hoffgaard	7
10	Johnny Faafeng	6
11	Oyvind S. Berg	5
12	Reidar Eide	5
13	Svein Johansen	3
14	Olav Aaen	3
15	Kjell H. Helgsen	2
16	Hans Age Trovik	1
17	Svein Svensrud	1

=== Finnish qualifying ===
- 28 August 1964
- (Finland) Kärpänen Speedway, Lahti
- Top 3 (+2 seeded) to Nordic qualification 1965

Pos.	Rider	Points
1	Kalevi Lahtinen	15
2	Timo Laine	14
3	Matti Olin	13
4	Esko Koponen	12
5	Olavi Turunen	10
6	Antero Salasto	9
7	Veikko Metsahuone	8
8	Timo Sinkkonen	8
9	Heikki Kaprali	6
10	Jouko Naskali	6
11	Juhani Taipale	5
12	Reijo Tolviander (res)	4
13	Erkki Hannula	3
14	Reima Lohkovuori	3
15	Toimi Skytta (res)	3
16	Veikko Vesa	2
17	Martti Myllynausta	0
18	Jarmo Bahne	0

=== Swedish qualifying ===
- Top 16 to Nordic qualifying

Date	Venue	Winner	2nd	3rd
25 April	Vetlanda Motorstadion, Vetlanda	Bo Josefsson	Leif Enecrona	Rune Sörmander
28 April	Ryavallen, Borås	Ove Fundin	Per Olof Söderman	Björn Knutson
1 May	Gamla Speedway Track, Visby	Bengt Jansson	Bo Josefsson	Hasse Holmqvist

Pos.	Rider	Points
1	Bo Josefsson	28
2	Bengt Jansson	26
3	Björn Knutson	23
4	Ove Fundin	23
5	Per-Olof Söderman	23
6	Sören Sjösten	22
7	Bo Magnusson	19
8	Hasse Holmqvist	19
9	Leif Enecrona	19
10	Rune Sörmander	18
11	Göte Nordin	18
12	Gunnar Malmqvist	16
13	Leif Larsson	14
14	Bengt Svensson	14

Pos.	Rider	Points
15	Bengt Brannefors	14
16	Runo Wedin	13
17	Curt Eldh	9
18	Sven Sigurd	9
19	Kurt Westlund	9
20	Hans Utterström	6
21	Inge Gustafsson	5
22	Arne Hansson	4
23	Nils Ringström	3
24	Karl-Erik Andersson	3
25	Leif Söderberg	1
26	Per-Tage Svensson	0
27	Lars Jansson	0

=== Continental qualifying ===
- Top 32 to Continental semi-finals

Date	Venue	Winner	2nd	3rd
9 May	(Austria) Liebenauer Stadium, Graz	(Poland) Andrzej Wyglenda	(Czechoslovakia) Jaroslav Volf	(Poland) Antoni Woryna
9 May	(Socialist Federal Republic of Yugoslavia) Ilirija Sports Park, Ljubljana	(Soviet Union) Gennady Kurilenko	(Poland) Jan Mucha	(Poland) Andrzej Pogorzelski
9 May	(Hungary) Borsod Volán Stadion, Miskolc	(Czechoslovakia) Luboš Tomíček Sr.	(Soviet Union) Yuri Chekranov	(Poland) Pawel Waloszek
9 May	(East Germany) Gunter Harder Stadion, Neubrandenburg	(Poland) Zbigniew Podlecki	(Soviet Union) Boris Samorodov	(Czechoslovakia) Rudolf Havelka

=== British & Commonwealth preliminary round ===
- Top 11 riders to qualifying round

Date	Venue	Winner	2nd	3rd
13 May	Cleveland Park, Middlesbrough	Goog Allan	Russ Dent	Harry Bastable
15 May	Rayleigh Weir Stadium, Rayleigh	Tommy Sweetman	Ken Adams	Des Lukehurst
22 May	Foxhall Stadium, Ipswich	Tommy Sweetman	Howdy Byford	Ken Adams
26 May	Central Park, Cowdenbeath	Russ Dent	Bruce Ovenden	Graham Coombes
6 June	King's Lynn Stadium, King's Lynn	Harry Bastable	Pete Smith	Maurie McDermott

== Second round ==
=== Nordic qualification ===
- 11 May
- (Norway) Geiteryggen Speedwaybane, Skien
- Top 8 to Nordic final

Pos.	Rider	Points
1	Björn Knutson	15
2	Sverre Harrfeldt	14
3	Leif Enecrona	13
4	Ove Fundin	12
5	Bengt Brannefors	9
6	Gunnar Malmqvist	9
7	Bo Magnusson	9
8	Henry Harrfeldt	7
9	Thorbjörn Nygaard	7
10	Curt Eldh	7
11	Nils Paulsen	5
12	Runo Wedin	4
13	Ivar Hoffgard	3
14	Olavi Turunen	3
15	Timo Laine	2
16	Heikki Kaprali	0

- 27 May
- (Denmark) Selskov Stadium, Hillerød
- Top 8 to Nordic final

Pos.	Rider	Points
1	Leif Larsson	14
2	Per-Olof Söderman	13
3	Hasse Holmqvist	12
4	Sören Sjösten	12
5	Kalevi Lahtinen	11
6	Bengt Jansson	11
7	Bo Josefsson	10
8	Sven Sigurd	9
9	Hans G. Kristensen	6
10	Bengt Svensson	6
11	Ove Pedersen	4
12	Erik Kastebo	4
13	Matti Olin	3
14	Per Jakob Aulie	2
15	Jens Ring (res)	2
16	Knut Syrrist	1
17	Bent Jensen	0
18	Göte Nordin	dns

=== Continental semi-finals ===
- 23 May
- (West Germany) Abensberger Stadion, Abensberg
- Top 8 to Continental final

Pos.	Rider	Points
1	Pawel Waloszek	13
2	Igor Plekhanov	13
3	Andrzej Wyglenda	12
4	Jaroslav Volf	11
5	Luboš Tomíček Sr.	11
6	Antoni Woryna	10
7	Valentin Moiseev	9
8	Stanislav Kubicek	7
9	Jurij Chekranov	
10	Vladimir Sokolov	
11	František Ledecký	
12	Jerzy Trzeszkowski	
13	Gabdrakhman Kadyrov	
14	Miloslav Šmíd	
15	Pal Perenyi	

- 23 May
- (Soviet Union) Army Sports Club Stadium, Lviv
- Top 8 to Continental final

Pos.	Rider	Points
1	Pavel Mareš	15
2	Jan Mucha	11
3	Zbigniew Podlecki	11
4	Florian Kapala	10
5	Marian Rose	10
6	Joachim Maj	10
7	Gennadij Kurilenko	10
8	Andrzej Pogorzelski	9
9	Antonín Kasper Sr.	8
10	Boris Samorodov	6
11	Antonín Šváb Sr.	6
12	Jurij Olenev	5
13	Rudolf Havelka	4
14	Lew Krajev	3
15	Konstantij Krishtal	0
16	Viktor Trofimov	0

=== British & Commonwealth qualifying round ===
- Top 32 to British semi-finals

Date	Venue	Winner	2nd	3rd
12 June	Brandon Stadium, Coventry	Nigel Boocock	Jack Kitchen	Rick France
12 June	Abbey Stadium, Swindon	Barry Briggs	Mike Broadbanks	Martin Ashby
12 June	Hyde Road, Manchester	Cyril Maidment	Gordon McGregor	Dick Fisher
14 June	County Ground Stadium, Exeter	Barry Briggs	Trevor Hedge	Geoff Mudge
14 June	Brough Park, Newcastle	Charlie Monk	Brian Brett	Ivan Mauger
15 June	West Ham Stadium, London	Roy Trigg	Norman Hunter	Ken McKinlay
16 June	Long Eaton Stadium, Long Eaton	Barry Briggs	Jim Lightfoot	Jack Kitchen
17 June	Owlerton Stadium, Sheffield	Nigel Boocock	Clive Featherby	Billy Bales
17 June	Oxford Stadium, Oxford	Jimmy Gooch	Ron How	Colin Pratt
18 June	Somerton Park, Newport	Peter Vandenberg	Reg Luckhurst	Cyril Maidment
18 June	White City, Glasgow	Charlie Monk	Bluey Scott	Ivan Mauger
18 June	Hackney Wick Stadium, London	Ron How	Roy Trigg	Colin Pratt
18 June	Monmore Green, Wolverhampton	Trevor Hedge	Peter Jarman	Nigel Boocock
19 June	Wimbledon Stadium, London	Trevor Hedge	Bob Andrews	Jack Biggs
19 June	The Shay, Halifax	Jimmy Gooch	Ronnie Genz	Eric Boocock
19 June	Dudley Wood Stadium, Dudley	Charlie Monk	Jim Airey	John Hart
19 July	Old Meadowbank, Edinburgh	Maury Mattingley	Gordon Guasco	Brian Craven
23 July	Wimborne Road, Poole	Ronnie Genz	Geoff Mudge	Roy Trigg

== Third round ==
=== British & Commonwealth semi finals ===
- 28 July
- (England) Wimborne Road, Poole
- Top 8 to British final

Pos.	Rider	Points
1	(England) Nigel Boocock	13
2	(New Zealand) Barry Briggs	11
3	(England) Jimmy Gooch	11
4	(Scotland) Ken McKinlay	11
5	(England) Ronnie Genz	10
6	(England) Reg Luckhurst	10
7	(England) Mike Broadbanks	10
8	(Australia) Gordon Guasco	9
9	(England) Norman Hunter	9
10	(Australia) Geoff Mudge	7
11	(England) Jack Kitchen	6
12	(Australia) Jim Airey	6
13	(England) Colin Pratt	3
14	(England) Clive Featherby	2
15	(Australia) Bluey Scott	1
16	(Scotland) Gordon McGregor	1

- 30 July
- (Scotland) White City, Glasgow
- Top 8 to British final

Pos.	Rider	Points
1	(Australia) Charlie Monk	14
2	(England) Trevor Hedge	14
3	(England) Brian Brett	13
4	(New Zealand) Ivan Mauger	11
5	(England) Colin Gooddy	10
6	(New Zealand) Bill Andrew	9
7	(England) Bob Andrews	8
8	(Australia) Peter Vandenberg	8
9	(England) Cyril Maidment	7
10	(England) Dave Younghusband	7
11	(England) Roy Trigg	7
12	(England) Eric Boocock	4
13	(England) Jim Lightfoot	3
14	(England) Alan Cowland	3
15	(England) Rick France	2
16	(England) Billy Bales	0
17	(England) Martin Ashby	0

=== Nordic Final ===
- 28 June 1965
- (Norway) Geiteryggen Speedwaybane, Skien
- First 8 to European Final

Pos.	Rider	Heat Scores	Total
1	(Sweden) Soren Sjosten		14
2	(Sweden) Ove Fundin		12
3	(Sweden) Leif Enecrona		11
4	(Sweden) Björn Knutson		11
5	(Sweden) Bengt Jansson		11
6	(Sweden) Gunnar Malmqvist		11
7	(Norway) Sverre Harrfeldt		10
8	(Sweden) Leif Larsson		9
9	(Sweden) Per Olof Söderman		7
10	(Sweden) Bo Magnusson		5
11	(Finland) Kalevi Lahtinen		4
12	(Norway) Henry Harrfeldt		4
13	(Sweden) Bo Josefsson		3
14	(Norway) Sven Sigurd		2
15	(Sweden) Bengt Brannefors		0
16	(Sweden) Hasse Holmqvist		0

=== Continental Final ===
- 13 June 1965
- (Poland) Olympic Stadium, Wrocław
- First 8 to European Final plus 1 reserve

Placing	Rider	Total	1	2	3	4	5	6	7	8	9	10	11	12	13	14	15	16	17	18	19	20	Pts	Pos
1	(Poland) (15) Andrzej Wyglenda	12				1			3			2						3	3				12	1
2	(Soviet Union) (2) Igor Plekhanov	12	2					3				1				3				3			12	2
3	(Poland) (14) Andrzej Pogorzelski	11				0		2					3		3							3	11	3
4	(Poland) (12) Antoni Woryna	10			3					3		0			2						2		10	4
5	(Czechoslovakia) (1) Luboš Tomíček Sr.	10	3				3				1				1				2				10	5
6	(Poland) (7) Pawel Waloszek	9		3					2					3	0					1			9	6
7	(Czechoslovakia) (13) Antonín Kasper Sr.	8				3	2							1		1					1		8	7
8	(Poland) (6) Marian Rose	8		1				1			3							0			3		8	8
9	(Czechoslovakia) (5) Pavel Mareš	8		2			0					3					1					2	8	9
10	(Poland) (9) Joachim Maj	7			2		1						0					2		2			7	10
11	(Soviet Union) (3) Gennady Kurilenko	6	1						1				1				3				0		6	11
12	(Poland) (8) Zbigniew Podlecki	6		0						1			2			2			1				6	12
13	(Poland) (10) Jan Mucha	5			1			0						2			2		0				5	13
14	(Czechoslovakia) (11) Jaroslav Volf	3			0				0		2					0						1	3	14
15	(Czechoslovakia) (4) Stanislav Kubíček	3	0							2				0				1				0	3	15
16	(Soviet Union) (16) Valentin Moiseev	2				2				0	0						0			0			2	16
R1	(Poland) (R1) Florian Kapała	0																					0	R1
Placing	Rider	Total	1	2	3	4	5	6	7	8	9	10	11	12	13	14	15	16	17	18	19	20	Pts	Pos

m - exclusion for exceeding two minute time allowance • t - exclusion for touching the tapes • x - other exclusion • e - retired or mechanical failure • f - fell • ns - non-starter • nc - non-classify

gate A - inside	gate B	gate C	gate D - outside

== Fourth round ==
=== British & Commonwealth Final ===
- 31 August 1965
- (England) West Ham Stadium, London
- first 8 to World Final plus 1 reserve

Placing	Rider	Total	1	2	3	4	5	6	7	8	9	10	11	12	13	14	15	16	17	18	19	20	Pts	Pos	21
1	(New Zealand) (8) Barry Briggs	13		1						3			3			3			3				13	1	
2	(England) (2) Nigel Boocock	11	3					3				E				2				3			11	2	3
3	(Scotland) (4) Ken McKinlay	11	2							2				3				2				2	11	3	2
4	(England) (10) Brian Brett	10			3			2						1			2		2				10	4	
5	(England) (12) Reg Luckhurst	10			2					0		3			2						3		10	5	
6	(England) (11) Jimmy Gooch	10			1				2		3					1						3	10	6	
7	(England) (7) Mike Broadbanks	9		2					0					2	3					2			9	7	3
8	(Australia) (15) Gordon Guasco	9				3			1			1						3	1				9	8	2
9	(Australia) (5) Charlie Monk	8		3			2					2					1					X	8	9	
10	(England) (16) Trevor Hedge	7				2				1	F						3			1			7	10	
11	(New Zealand) (3) Bob Andrews	6	1						3				1				0				1		6	11	
12	(New Zealand) (14) Ivan Mauger	5				1		0					2		1							1	5	12	
13	(England) (6) Colin Gooddy	4		0				1			M							1			2		4	13	
14	(Australia) (9) Peter Vandenberg	3			E		3						0					0		0			3	14	
15	(New Zealand) (1) Bill Andrew	1	E				0				1				0				0				1	15	
16	(England) (13) Ronnie Genz	1				E	1							0		F					0		1	16	
R1	(England) (R1) Norman Hunter	0																					0	R1	
Placing	Rider	Total	1	2	3	4	5	6	7	8	9	10	11	12	13	14	15	16	17	18	19	20	Pts	Pos	21

m - exclusion for exceeding two minute time allowance • t - exclusion for touching the tapes • x - other exclusion • e - retired or mechanical failure • f - fell • ns - non-starter • nc - non-classify

gate A - inside	gate B	gate C	gate D - outside

=== European Final ===
- 26 June 1965
- (Czechoslovakia) Slaný Speedway Stadium, Slaný
- First 8 to World Final plus 1 reserve

Placing	Rider	Total	1	2	3	4	5	6	7	8	9	10	11	12	13	14	15	16	17	18	19	20	Pts	Pos	21
1	(Sweden) (3) Ove Fundin	14	3						3				2				3				3		14	1	3
2	(Sweden) (8) Björn Knutson	14		2						3			3			3			3				14	2	2
3	(Poland) (9) Antoni Woryna	11			3		1						1					3		3			11	3	
4	(Poland) (14) Andrzej Pogorzelski	10				3		3					0		3							1	10	4	
5	(Soviet Union) (10) Igor Plekhanov	10			2			2						3			2		1				10	5	
6	(Poland) (6) Andrzej Wyglenda	9		3				1			1							2			2		9	6	
7	(Sweden) (13) Bengt Jansson	8				0	3							2		2					1		8	7	
8	(Sweden) (16) Soren Sjosten	8				2				2	2						1			1			8	8	
9	(Czechoslovakia) (7) Luboš Tomíček Sr.	7		1					1					1	2					2			7	9	
10	(Sweden) (15) Leif Larsson	7				1			2			3						1	0				7	10	
11	(Poland) (1) Marian Rose	7	1				E				3				2				1				7	11	
12	(Czechoslovakia) (4) Antonín Kasper Sr.	6	2							1				0				0				3	6	12	
13	(Sweden) (5) Per Olof Söderman	5		0			2					1					0					2	5	13	
14	(Sweden) (12) Gunnar Malmqvist	3			1					E		2			0						0		3	14	
15	(Sweden) (2) Leif Enecrona	1	0					0				E				1				0			1	15	
16	(Poland) (11) Pawel Waloszek	0			0				0		0					0						0	0	16	
R1	(Czechoslovakia) (R1) Pavel Mareš	0																					0	R1	
Placing	Rider	Total	1	2	3	4	5	6	7	8	9	10	11	12	13	14	15	16	17	18	19	20	Pts	Pos	21

m - exclusion for exceeding two minute time allowance • t - exclusion for touching the tapes • x - other exclusion • e - retired or mechanical failure • f - fell • ns - non-starter • nc - non-classify

gate A - inside	gate B	gate C	gate D - outside

== World Final ==
- 18 September 1965
- (England) Wembley Stadium, London

Placing	Rider	Total	1	2	3	4	5	6	7	8	9	10	11	12	13	14	15	16	17	18	19	20	Pts	Pos	21
1	(Sweden) (12) Björn Knutson	14			2					3		3			3						3		14	1	
2	(Soviet Union) (15) Igor Plekhanov	13				3			3			2						2	3				13	2	3
3	(Sweden) (4) Ove Fundin	13	2							2				3				3				3	13	3	2
4	(New Zealand) (13) Barry Briggs	10				2	3							1		3					1		10	4	
5	(Sweden) (10) Bengt Jansson	10			3			1						2			2		2				10	5	
6	(England) (5) Brian Brett	9		3			0					1					3					2	9	6	
7	(Sweden) (14) Sören Sjösten	9				1		3					3		2							0	9	7	
8	(England) (2) Nigel Boocock	8	3					0				0				2				3			8	8	
9	(Poland) (6) Andrzej Pogorzelski	7		2				2			3							0			F		7	9	
10	(Poland) (11) Antoni Woryna	6			1				2		2					0						1	6	10	
11	(Sweden) (3) Leif Larsson	5	1						0				2				F				2		5	11	
12	(England) (9) Reg Luckhurst	4			0		2						1					1		0			4	12	
13	(Scotland) (7) Ken McKinlay	4		0					1					0	1					2			4	13	
14	(England) (8) Jimmy Gooch	3		1						1			0			1			0				3	14	
15	(Poland) (16) Andrzej Wyglenda	2				0				0	1						1			0			2	15	
16	(Czechoslovakia) (1) Luboš Tomíček Sr.	2	0				1				0				0				1				2	16	
R1	(England) (R1) Mike Broadbank	0																					0	R1	
R2	(Poland) (R2) Marian Rose	0																					0	R2	
Placing	Rider	Total	1	2	3	4	5	6	7	8	9	10	11	12	13	14	15	16	17	18	19	20	Pts	Pos	21

m - exclusion for exceeding two minute time allowance • t - exclusion for touching the tapes • x - other exclusion • e - retired or mechanical failure • f - fell • ns - non-starter • nc - non-classify

gate A - inside	gate B	gate C	gate D - outside
