= 1963 Individual Speedway World Championship =

Motorcycle speedway world championship season

Seasons
- ← 1962 1964 →

The 1963 Individual Speedway World Championship was the 18th edition of the official World Championship to determine the world champion rider.

Ove Fundin extended his record by winning a fourth world crown. Fellow Sweden Björn Knutson finished second and Barry Briggs took the bronze medal.

== First round ==
Qualification results.

=== Swedish qualifying ===
- Top 16 to Nordic qualifying

Date	Venue	Winner	2nd	3rd
28 April	Vetlanda Motorstadion, Vetlanda	Björn Knutson	Ove Fundin	Per Tage Svensson
1 May	Gamla Speedway Track, Visby	Rune Sörmander	Ove Fundin	Willihard Thorsson
5 May	Gamla Motorstadion, Målilla	Per Olof Söderman	Arne Carlsson	Göran Norlén

Pos.	Rider	Points
1	Björn Knutson	26
2	Arne Carlsson	24
3	Ove Fundin	23
4	Per-Olof Söderman	22
5	Göran Norlén	22
6	Sören Sjösten	20
7	Willihard Thomsson	20
8	Per-Tage Svensson	19
9	Rune Sörmander	18
10	Olle Nygren	16
11	Leif Larsson	16
12	Bernt Nilsson	15

Pos.	Rider	Points
13	Bengt Brannefors	13
14	Åke Andersson	13
15	Kjell Svensson	13
16	Göte Nordin	13
17	Inge Gustafsson	13
18	Curt Eldh	13
19	Per-Åke Lundgren	9
20	Evert Andersson	9
21	Bengt Jansson	9
22	Thorvald Karlsson	8
23	Curt Nyqvist	2
24	Göran Carlsson	0

=== Norwegian qualifying ===
- 21 October 1962
- (Norway) Marienlyst Stadion, Drammen
- Top 5 to Nordic qualification 1963

Pos.	Rider	Points
1	Sverre Harrfeldt	15
2	Aage Hansen	14
3	Jon Odegaard	12
4	Tore Svaleng	11
5	Per Jakob Aulie	10
6	Svein Johansen	9
7	Rolf Westerberg	9
8	Bjarne Sorenby	6
9	Reidar Eide	5
10	Oystein Mellerud	5
11	Reidar Larsen	4
12	Reidar Bakken	4
13	Johnny Faafeng	3
14	Egil H. Kruke	1

=== Finnish qualifying ===
- 27 July 1962
- (Finland) Eteläpuisto, Tampere
- Top 4 to Nordic qualification 1963

Pos.	Rider	Points
1	Timo Laine	15
2	Kalevi Lahtinen	14
3	Esko Koponen	13
4	Olavi Turunen	12
5	Martti Assinen	11
6	Antero Salasto	10
7	Yrjo Vuori	7
8	Keijo Sarubin	6
9	Seppo Virtanen	6
10	Osmo Hokkanen	5
11	Kari Ala Sippola	5

=== British & Commonwealth Provincial qualifying ===
- Top 16 riders to British Provincial final

Date	Venue	Winner	2nd	3rd
10 June	Brough Park, Newcastle upon Tyne	Ivan Mauger	Brian Craven	Brian Brett
10 June	County Ground Stadium, Exeter	Len Silver	Peter Vandenberg	Ross Gilbertson
11 June	Cornish Stadium, St Austell	George Hunter	John Hart	John Dews
11 June	New Cross Stadium, London	Ivor Brown	Reg Luckhurst	Wayne Briggs
11 June	Long Eaton Stadium, Long Eaton	Charlie Monk	Graham Warren	Chris Julian
12 June	Wimborne Road, Poole	Brian Brett	Ross Gilbertson	Reg Luckhurst
12 June	Hackney Wick Stadium, London	Norman Hunter	Trevor Hedge	Colin Pratt
13 June	Owlerton Stadium, Sheffield	Jack Kitchen	Graham Warren	Clive Featherby
13 June	Cleveland Park, Middlesbrough	Peter Vandenberg	Eric Boothroyd	Eric Boocock
14 June	Monmore Green, Wolverhampton	Ivan Mauger	George Hunter	Maury Mattingley
15 June	Dudley Wood Stadium, Dudley	Ivor Brown	Maury Mattingley	Cliff Cox
15 June	Sun Street Stadium, Hanley	Jack Kitchen	Colin Pratt	Peter Jarman
15 June	Rayleigh Weir Stadium, Rayleigh	Clive Featherby	Ken Adams	Tommy Roper
15 June	Old Meadowbank, Edinburgh	Doug Templeton	Jimmy Squibb	Wayne Briggs

=== Continental qualifying ===
- Top 32 to Continental semi-final

Date	Venue	Winner	2nd	3rd
9 May	(Czechoslovakia) Great Strahov Stadium, Prague	(Soviet Union) Igor Plekhanov	(Czechoslovakia) Antonín Kasper Sr.	(Poland) Henryk Żyto
12 May	(Austria) Linzer Stadion, Linz	(Czechoslovakia) Luboš Tomíček Sr.	(Socialist Federal Republic of Yugoslavia) Evald Babic	(West Germany) Manfred Poschenreider
12 May	(Soviet Union) Stroitel Stadium, Ufa	(Soviet Union) Farid Szajnurov	(Poland) Andrzej Pogorzelski	(Czechoslovakia) Miroslav Šmíd
12 May	(Socialist Federal Republic of Yugoslavia) Stražišče Sports Park, Kranj	(Soviet Union) Boris Samorodov	(Soviet Union) Gennady Kurilenko	(Poland) Marian Kaiser

== Second round ==
=== Nordic qualification ===
- 10 May
- (Denmark) Selskov Stadium, Hillerød
- Top 8 to Nordic final

Pos.	Rider	Points
1	Ove Fundin	14
2	Per-Olof Söderman	12
3	Olle Nygren	12
4	Sören Sjösten	10
5	Åke Andersson	10
6	Kurt W. Petersen	10
7	Arne Pander	9
8	Timo Laine	7
9	Willihard Thomsson	7
10	Kjell Svensson	7
11	Kalevi Lahtinen	6
12	Bengt Brannefors	5
13	Jon Ödegaard	4
14	Erik Kastebo	4
15	Martti Assinen	3
16	Olavi Turunen	0

- 6 June
- (Norway) Dælenenga idrettspark, Oslo
- Top 8 to Nordic final

Pos.	Rider	Points
1	Göte Nordin	14
2	Björn Knutson	13
3	Göran Norlén	11
4	Bernt Nilsson	11
5	Arne Carlsson	10
6	Sverre Harrfeldt	9
7	Per-Tage Svensson	8
8	Leif Larsson	8
9	Rune Sörmander	8
10	Paul Wissing	8
11	Per Aulie	6
12	Nils Paulsen	5
13	Reidar Eide	4
14	Cato Agner	2

=== British Provincial final ===
- 22 June, Old Meadowbank, Edinburgh
- Top 9 riders to British national league round

Pos.	Rider	Points
1	Ivan Mauger	14
2	Eric Boothroyd	13
3	George Hunter	12
4	Jack Kitchen	11
5	Brian Brett	10
6	Len Silver	9
7	Peter Vandenberg	9
8	Maury Mattingley	8
9	Doug Templeton	7

Pos.	Rider	Points
10	Eric Boocock	6
11	Charlie Monk	6
12	Reg Luckhurst	5
13	Ivor Brown	5
14	Ross Gilbertson	3
15	Clive Featherby	1
16	Cliff Cox	1
17	Colin Pratt	0

=== Continental semi-finals ===
- 3 June
- (West Germany) Abensberger Stadion, Abensberg
- Top 8 to Continental final

Pos.	Rider	Points
1	(West Germany) Josef Hofmeister	15
2	(Soviet Union) Boris Samorodov	14
3	(Poland) Pawel Waloszek	12
4	(Poland) Marian Kaiser	10
5	(Czechoslovakia) Luboš Tomíček Sr.	9
6	(Soviet Union) Vitalij Sjilo	8
7	(Poland) Marian Rose	8
8	(West Germany) Manfred Poschenreider	8
9	(Socialist Federal Republic of Yugoslavia) Franc Babic	8
10	(Czechoslovakia) Bohumír Bartoněk	6
11	(West Germany) Heinrich Sprenger	6
12	(Poland) Marek Kepa	5
13	(Czechoslovakia) Karel Průša	5
14	(Socialist Federal Republic of Yugoslavia) Borek Regvart	3
15	(Czechoslovakia) Antonin Novak	3
16	(West Germany) Alfred Aberl	0

3 June

- (Soviet Union) Army Sports Club Stadium, Lviv
- Top 8 to Continental final

Pos.	Rider	Points
1	(Poland) Stanisław Tkocz	14
2	(Soviet Union) Igor Plekhanov	13
3	(Poland) Henryk Żyto	12
4	(Czechoslovakia) Zdeněk Kovář	10
5	(Czechoslovakia) Antonín Kasper Sr.	10
6	(Poland) Joachim Maj	9
7	(Poland) Andrzej Pogorzelski	9
8	(Soviet Union) Yuri Chekranov	8
9	(Czechoslovakia) Stanislav Kubicek	7
10	(Poland) Mieczyslaw Polukard	6
11	(Soviet Union) Farid Szajnurov	6
12	(Soviet Union) Viktor Kuznecov	5
13	(Czechoslovakia) Miroslav Smid	4
14	(Poland) Bronislaw Rogal	3
15	(Czechoslovakia) Jan Holub I (res)	3
16	(Poland) Edmund Migos	2
17	(Czechoslovakia) Frantisek Ledecky	dns

== Third round ==
=== British & Commonwealth national league round ===
- Top 16 to British & Commonwealth finals

Date	Venue	Winner	2nd	3rd
29 June	Brandon Stadium, Coventry	Ron Mountford	Doug Templeton	Jack Geran
1 July	Wimbledon Stadium, London	Mike Broadbanks	Ron How	Bob Andrews
2 July	Banister Court Stadium, Southampton	Barry Briggs	Dick Fisher	Peter Craven
4 July	Oxford Stadium, Oxford	Peter Craven	Barry Briggs	Ken McKinlay
5 July	Abbey Stadium, Swindon	Mike Broadbanks	Ron How	Nigel Boocock
10 July	Hyde Road, Manchester	Ken McKinlay	Dick Fisher	Brian Brett
12 July	The Firs Stadium, Norwich	Peter Craven	Peter Moore	Jimmy Gooch

=== Nordic Final ===
- 9 June 1963
- (Sweden) Växjö Motorstadion, Växjö
- First 8 to European Final

Pos.	Rider	Heat Scores	Total
1	(Sweden) Ove Fundin	3,3,3,3,3	15
2	(Sweden) Björn Knutson		12
3	(Sweden) Göte Nordin		12
4	(Norway) Sverre Harrfeldt		11
5	(Sweden) Arne Carlsson		9
6	(Sweden) Per Tage Svensson		9
7	(Sweden) Bernt Nilsson		9
8	(Sweden) Per Olof Söderman		8
9	(Sweden) Göran Norlén		8
10	(Finland) Timo Laine		8
11	(Sweden) Rune Sörmander		7
12	(Sweden) Sören Sjösten		5
13	(Sweden) Leif Larsson		3
14	(Sweden) Åke Andersson		2
15	(Denmark) Kurt W. Petersen		1
16	(Sweden) Olle Nygren		0
R1	(Denmark) Arne Pander		0

=== Continental Final ===
- 23 June 1963
- (Poland) Olympic Stadium, Wrocław
- First 8 to European Final plus 1 reserve

Placing	Rider	Total	1	2	3	4	5	6	7	8	9	10	11	12	13	14	15	16	17	18	19	20	Pts	Pos
1	(Poland) (13) Stanisław Tkocz	15				3	3							3		3					3		15	1
2	(Soviet Union) (9) Boris Samorodov	12			2		2						3					3		2			12	2
3	(Czechoslovakia) (14) Antonín Kasper Sr.	11				2		3					1		3							2	11	3
4	(Poland) (16) Joachim Maj	9				0				3	3						3			E			9	4
5	(Poland) (1) Marian Kaiser	9	3				1				2				E				3				9	5
6	(Soviet Union) (2) Igor Plekhanov	9	0					2				2				2				3			9	6
7	(Czechoslovakia) (12) Luboš Tomíček Sr.	9			1					2		3			2						1		9	7
8	(Poland) (10) Henryk Żyto	9			3			1						1			2		2				9	8
9	(West Germany) (4) Josef Hofmeister	9	1							1				2				2				3	9	9
10	(Czechoslovakia) (3) Stanislav Kubíček	8	2						2				2				F				2		8	10
11	(Poland) (7) Pawel Waloszek	6		3					1					E	1					1			6	11
12	(Poland) (15) Andrzej Pogorzelski	4				1			3			E						0					4	12
13	(Poland) (8) Marian Rose	4		2						0			0			1			1				4	13
14	(West Germany) (6) Manfred Poschenreider	3		1				0			1							1			0		3	14
15	(Soviet Union) (5) Yuri Chekranov	2		0			0					1					1					0	2	15
16	(Soviet Union) (11) Vitalij Shilo	1			0				0		0					0						1	1	16
Placing	Rider	Total	1	2	3	4	5	6	7	8	9	10	11	12	13	14	15	16	17	18	19	20	Pts	Pos

m - exclusion for exceeding two minute time allowance • t - exclusion for touching the tapes • x - other exclusion • e - retired or mechanical failure • f - fell • ns - non-starter • nc - non-classify

gate A - inside	gate B	gate C	gate D - outside

== Fourth round ==
=== British & Commonwealth Finals ===
Three events with the top 8 accumulated scorers going through to World Final.

Date	Venue	Winner	2nd	3rd
22 July	Wimbledon Stadium, London	Peter Craven	Barry Briggs	Nigel Boocock
23 July	Banister Court Stadium, Southampton	Barry Briggs	Peter Craven	Peter Moore
26 July	The Firs Stadium, Norwich	Barry Briggs	Peter Craven	Leo McAuliffe

Pos.	Rider	Points
1	(England) Peter Craven	42
2	(New Zealand) Barry Briggs	41
3	(England) Nigel Boocock	31
4	(Wales) Leo McAuliffe	31
5	(England) Ron How	29
6	(England) Jim Lightfoot	27
7	(England) Dick Fisher	27
8	(New Zealand) Peter Moore	26

Pos.	Rider	Points
9	(United Kingdom) Tadeusz Teodorowicz	23
10	(England) Ron Mountford	18
11	(England) Bob Andrews	17
12	(England) Mike Broadbanks	15
13	(England) Cyril Maidment	13
14	(Scotland) Ken McKinlay	12
15	(Australia) Neil Street	6
16	(Scotland) Doug Templeton	2

=== European Final ===
- 28 August 1963
- (Sweden) Ullevi, Gothenburg
- First 8 to World Final

Placing	Rider	Total	1	2	3	4	5	6	7	8	9	10	11	12	13	14	15	16	17	18	19	20	Pts	Pos
1	(Sweden) (8) Björn Knutson	15		3						3			3			3			3				15	1
2	(Sweden) (5) Ove Fundin	13		1			3					3					3					3	13	2
3	(Sweden) (2) Per Olof Söderman	10	3					2				2				1				2			10	3
4	(Sweden) (1) Arne Carlsson	10	2				2				3				1				2				10	4
5	(Soviet Union) (11) Boris Samorodov	9			3				3		1					2						0	9	5
6	(Norway) (14) Sverre Harrfeldt	9				F		3					1		3							2	9	6
7	(Sweden) (7) Göte Nordin	9		2					2					0	2					3			9	7
8	(Sweden) (16) Per Tage Svensson	9				3				2	2						1			1			9	8
9	(Czechoslovakia) (3) Antonín Kasper Sr.	8	1						1				2				2				2		8	9
10	(Poland) (13) Henryk Żyto	7				1	X							3		0					3		7	10
11	(Soviet Union) (6) Igor Plekhanov	4		0				1			0							3			0		4	11
12	(Sweden) (4) Bernt Nilsson	4	0							1				2				0				1	4	12
13	(Poland) (12) Stanisław Tkocz	4			2					0		1			F						1		4	13
14	(Poland) (15) Marian Kaiser	4				2			0			0						1	1				4	14
15	(Czechoslovakia) (9) Luboš Tomíček Sr.	3			0		1						0					2		0			3	15
16	(Poland) (10) Joachim Maj	2			1			0						1			0		0				2	16
R1	(West Germany) (R1) Josef Hofmeister	0																					0	R1
Placing	Rider	Total	1	2	3	4	5	6	7	8	9	10	11	12	13	14	15	16	17	18	19	20	Pts	Pos

m - exclusion for exceeding two minute time allowance • t - exclusion for touching the tapes • x - other exclusion • e - retired or mechanical failure • f - fell • ns - non-starter • nc - non-classify

gate A - inside	gate B	gate C	gate D - outside

== World Final ==
- 14 September 1963
- (England) Wembley Stadium, London

Placing	Rider	Total	1	2	3	4	5	6	7	8	9	10	11	12	13	14	15	16	17	18	19	20	Pts	Pos
1	(Sweden) (9) Ove Fundin	14			3		3						2					3		3			14	1
2	(Sweden) (8) Björn Knutson	13		2						2			3			3			3				13	2
3	(New Zealand) (12) Barry Briggs	12			1					3		3			3						2		12	3
4	(Soviet Union) (11) Boris Samorodov	11			0				3		3					2						3	11	4
5	(Sweden) (13) Göte Nordin	10				3	2							3		1					1		10	5
6	(Norway) (3) Sverre Harrfeldt	10	2						2				1				2				3		10	6
7	(England) (1) Nigel Boocock	8	3				1				1				2				1				8	7
8	(Wales) (16) Leo McAuliffe	7				2				E	2						3			0			7	8
9	(England) (10) Ron How	7			2			3						F			F		2				7	9
10	(England) (6) Peter Craven	6		3				1			F							2			0		6	10
11	(Australia) (7) Peter Moore	6		1					1					1	1					2			6	11
12	(Sweden) (5) Per Olof Söderman	5		0			0					2					1					2	5	12
13	(England) (4) Dick Fisher	5	1							1				2				0				1	5	13
14	(England) (2) Jim Lightfoot	4	E					2				1				0				1			4	14
15	(Sweden) (14) Per Tage Svensson	1				1		F					0		0							0	1	15
16	(Sweden) (15) Arne Carlsson	1				0			0			0						1	0				1	16
R1	(United Kingdom) (R1) Tadeusz Teodorowicz	0																					0	R1
R2	(England) (R2) Ron Mountford	0																					0	R2
Placing	Rider	Total	1	2	3	4	5	6	7	8	9	10	11	12	13	14	15	16	17	18	19	20	Pts	Pos

m - exclusion for exceeding two minute time allowance • t - exclusion for touching the tapes • x - other exclusion • e - retired or mechanical failure • f - fell • ns - non-starter • nc - non-classify

gate A - inside	gate B	gate C	gate D - outside
