= 1966 Speedway World Team Cup =

7th edition of the annual motorcycle speedway World Cup competition

Seasons
- ← 1965 1967 →

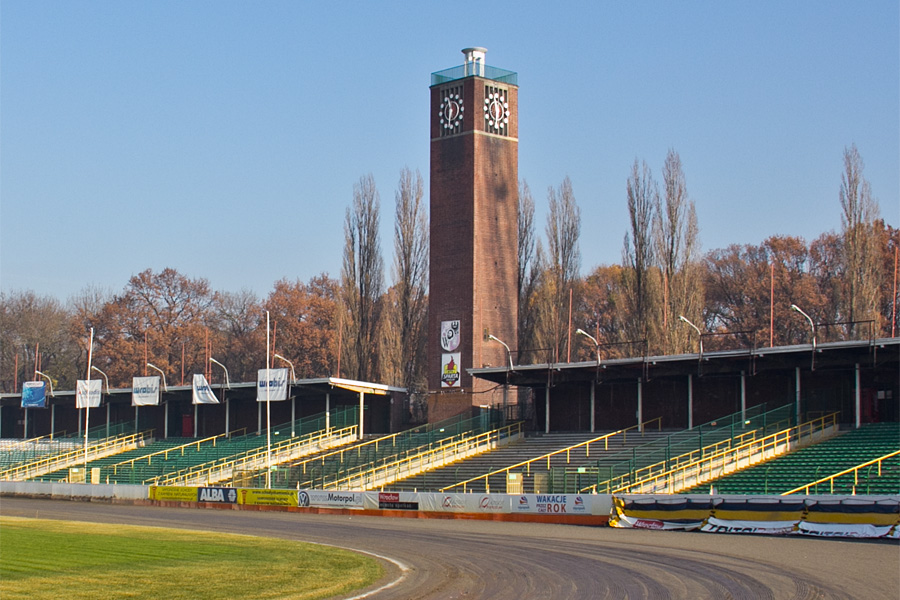
The venue of the 1966 final in Wrocław was known as the General Karol Świerczewski stadium at the time.

The 1966 Speedway World Team Cup was the seventh edition of the FIM Speedway World Team Cup to determine the team world champions.

The final took place in Wrocław, Poland. The title was won by Poland for the third time.

== Qualification ==
=== Continental Semi-Final ===
- 31 July
- (East Germany) Glück-Auf Stadion, Senftenberg

Pos.	National team	Pts.	Riders
1	East Germany	32	Jochen Dinse 10; Bruno Bülau 9 Hans Jürgen Fritz 7 Gerhard Uhlenbrock 6
2	Hungary	31	Barnabas Gyepes 11; Ferenc Radasci 10; Janos Bernath 5 Istvan Pasztor 5
3	Yugoslavia	26	Milovan Stankovic 12; Valentin Medved 5 Franc Babic 5 Drago Perko 4
4	Austria	6	Alfred Sitzwoh 2 Helmut Walch 2 Gunther Walla 2 Kurt Schwingenschlogl 0

=== Continental Final ===
- 14 August
- (Soviet Union) Army Sports Club Stadium, Lviv

Pos.	National team	Pts.	Riders
1	Poland	38	Marian Rose 12; Antoni Woryna 10; Paweł Waloszek 9 Andrzej Wyglenda 7
2	Soviet Union	31	Boris Samorodov 11; Farid Szajnurov 8 Viktor Trofimov 8 Gennady Kurilenko 2 Vladimir Sokolov 2
3	Czechoslovakia	25	Antonín Kasper Sr. 7 Antonín Šváb Sr. 7 Luboš Tomíček Sr. 6 Pavel Mares 5
4	East Germany	1	Bruno Bülau 1 Jochen Dinse 0 Hans Jürgen Fritz 0 Gerhard Uhlenbrock 0

- Great Britain and Sweden seeded to final.

== World final ==
- September 11
- (Poland) Wrocław, General Karol Świerczewski Stadium

Pos.	National team	Pts.	Riders
1st	Poland	40	Andrzej Wyglenda - 11 (3,2,3,3); Antoni Woryna - 11 (3,2,3,3); Marian Rose - 10 (1,3,3,3); Andrzej Pogorzelski - 8 (3,3,2,ef); Edmund Migoś - NS
2nd	Soviet Union	26	Boris Samorodov - 10 (2,3,2,3); Igor Plekhanov - 6 (2,1,1,2); Viktor Trofimov - 6 (2,2,1,1); Farid Szajnurov - 4 (2,1,0,1); Yuri Chekranov - NS
3rd	Sweden	22	Bjorn Knutson - 11 (3,3,3,2); Leif Enecrona - 4 (1,2,1,-); Göte Nordin - 3 (1,1,1,0); Ove Fundin - 2 (ef,-,0,2); Leif Larsson - 2 (-,0,-,2)
4	Great Britain	8	Nigel Boocock - 4 (F,1,2,1); Ivan Mauger - 3 (0,ef,2,1); Barry Briggs - 1 (1,0,0,ef); Terry Betts - 0 (0,0,-,0); Colin Pratt - 0 (-,-,0,-)

== See also ==
- 1966 Individual Speedway World Championship
