= 1964 Speedway World Team Cup =

5th edition of the annual motorcycle speedway World Cup competition

Seasons
- ← 1963 1965 →

1964 Speedway World Team Cup was the fifth edition of the FIM Speedway World Team Cup to determine the team world champions.

The final took place in Abensberg, West Germany. The World Champion title was won by Sweden (34 pts) who beat Soviet Union (27 pts), Great Britain (21 pts) and Poland (16 pts).

== Format ==
Qualifying round
Kraków, Poland (details)
Poland | 45
Czechoslovakia | 33
West Germany | 14
Austria | 4
Svetozarevo, Yugoslavia (details)
Soviet Union | 40
Bulgaria | 24
Yugoslavia | 12
East Germany | 12

Semifinals
Hillerød, Denmark (details)
Sweden | 44
Denmark | 27
Finland | 15
Norway | 10
Lviv, Soviet Union (details)
Soviet Union | 37
Poland | 34
Czechoslovakia | 23
Yugoslavia | 2

Final
Abensberg, West Germany (details)
Sweden | 34
Soviet Union | 25
Great Britain* | 21
Poland | 16

* Great Britain seeded to the final

== Qualification ==
=== Continental Semi-Final 1 ===
- May 25
- (Poland) Kraków Speedway Stadium, Kraków

| Pos. | National team | Pts. | Riders |
|---|---|---|---|
| 1st | Poland | 45 | Andrzej Wyglenda - 12 (3,3,3,3); Andrzej Pogorzelski - 12 (3,3,3,3); Zbigniew Podlecki - 11; Marian Kaiser - 10; Edmund Migoś - NS |
| 2nd | Czechoslovakia | 33 | Stanislav Kubíček - 9 Antonín Kasper Sr. - 8 Karel Průša - 8 Jaroslav Volf - 8 Frantisek Ledecky - NS |
| 3rd | West Germany | 14 | Manfred Poschenreider - 6 Alfred Aberl - 3 Alois Frach - 3 Otto Lantenhammer - 2 Sebastian Wiesent - NS |
| 4 | Austria | 4 | Kurt Schwingenschlögl - 2 Gunther Walla - 1 Ludwig Löscher - 1 Ernst Glassner - 0 |

=== Continental Semi-Final 2 ===
- May 25
- (Socialist Federal Republic of Yugoslavia) Stadion Automoto Drustvo Svetozarevo

| Pos. | National team | Pts. | Riders |
|---|---|---|---|
| 1st | Soviet Union | 48 | Igor Plekhanov - 12 (3,3,3,3); Boris Samorodov - 12 (3,3,3,3); Gennady Kurilenko - 12 (3,3,3,3); Vitaly Shilo - 12 (3,3,3,3) |
| 2nd | Bulgaria | 24 | Milko Pejkov - 8 Gavril Macev - 8 Simeon Lukanov - 4 Krasimir Sokolov - 4 |
| 3rd | Yugoslavia | 12 | Slobodan Dzudovic - 5 Valentin Medved - 3 Drago Perko - 2 Drago Regvard - 2 |
| 4 | East Germany | 12 | Günther Schelenz - 5 Jochen Dinse - 5 Peter Hehlert - 2 Jürgen Hehlert - NS |

=== Scandinavian Round ===
- June 6
- (Denmark) Selskov Stadium, Hillerød

| Pos. | National team | Pts. | Riders |
|---|---|---|---|
| 1st | Sweden | 44 | Björn Knutson - 12 (3,3,3,3); Göte Nordin - 12 (3,3,3,3); Rune Sörmander - 12 (3,3,3,3); Per Tage Svensson - 6 Per Olof Söderman - 2 |
| 2nd | Denmark | 27 | Kurt W. Petersen - 9 Paul Wissing - 7 John S. Andersen - 6 Hans P. Boysen - 5 Ole Kläbel - NS |
| 3rd | Finland | 15 | Kalevi Lahtinen - 7 Ilkka Helminen - 5 Matti Olin - 3 Taisto Mattila - 0 Veikko Metsähuone - NS |
| 4 | Norway | 10 | Reidar Eide - 5 Per Aulie - 3 Cato Agnor - 1 Jonny Faafeng - 1 Henry Harrfeldt - NS |

=== Continental Final ===
- (Soviet Union) Army Sports Club Stadium, Lviv

(Yugoslavia replaced Bulgaria)

| Pos. | National team | Pts. | Riders |
|---|---|---|---|
| 1st | Soviet Union | 37 | Igor Plekhanov - 12 (3,3,3,3); Boris Samorodov - 11; Gennady Kurilenko - 8 Yuri Chekranov - 6 Gabdrakhman Kadyrov - NS |
| 2nd | Poland | 34 | Andrzej Wyglenda - 10; Andrzej Pogorzelski - 9 Zbigniew Podlecki - 9 Marian Kaiser - 4 Antoni Woryna - 2 |
| 3rd | Czechoslovakia | 23 | Antonín Kasper Sr. - 8 Stanislav Kubíček - 5 Jaroslav Volf - 5 Psvel Mares - 3 Frantisek Ledecky - 2 |
| 4 | Yugoslavia | 2 | Franc Babic - 1 Valentin Medved - 1 Drago Perko - 0 Drago Regvard - 0 Ivan Molan - NS |

== World final ==
- (West Germany) Abensberg, Abensberg Speedwaystadion

| Pos. | National team | Pts. | Riders |
|---|---|---|---|
| 1st | Sweden | 34 | Björn Knutson - 11 (3,3,2,3); Göte Nordin - 10 (3,2,2,3); Rune Sörmander - 7 (3,2,2,0); Ove Fundin - 6 (0,-,3,3); Sören Sjösten - 0 (-,0,-,-) |
| 2nd | Soviet Union | 25 | Igor Plekhanov - 8 (2,3,1,2); Gennady Kurilenko - 8 (2,1,3,2); Yuri Chekranov - 6 (2,2,1,1); Boris Samorodov - 3 (2,1,0,0); Viktor Trofimov - NS |
| 3rd | Great Britain | 21 | Barry Briggs - 9 (3,3,1,2); Ken McKinlay - 7 (1,3,3,0); Nigel Boocock - 3 (1,1,1,-); Ron How - 2 (1,-,0,1); Brian Brett - 0 (-,0,-,0) |
| 4 | Poland | 16 | Andrzej Wyglenda - 8 (0,2,3,3); Andrzej Pogorzelski - 3 (0,0,2,1); Zbigniew Podlecki - 3 (1,1,1,0); Marian Rose - 2 (-,0,0,2); Marian Kaiser - 0 (0,-,-,-) |

== See also ==
- 1964 Individual Speedway World Championship
- motorcycle speedway
