= 1961 Individual Speedway World Championship =

Motorcycle speedway world championship season

Seasons
- ← 1960 1962 →

The 1961 Individual Speedway World Championship was the 16th edition of the official World Championship to determine the world champion rider.

The final was held outside of Wembley and England for the first time when on the 15 September Ove Fundin retained his title in his home country of Sweden. It was the first time a rider had won three titles and Sweden produced a clean sweep of podium places with Björn Knutson and Göte Nordin finishing second and third.

== First round ==
Qualification results.

=== Norwegian qualifying ===
- 25 June 1960
- (Norway) Idda Idrettsplassen, Kristiansand
- Top 5 to Nordic qualification 1961

Pos.	Rider	Points
1	Aage Hansen	15
2	Oystein Mellerud	13+3
3	Sverre Harrfledt	13+2
4	Rolf Westerberg	12
5	Oddvar Kristiansen	9
6	Gunnar Skvetne	8
7	Jon Odegaard	8
8	Arne Kristiansen	7
9	Bjarne Sörenbye	7
10	Fred Roger Steen	7
11	Reidar Bakken	6
12	Egil H. Kruke	4
13	Egil Bratvold	4
14	Ole Rostad	3
15	Reidar Eide	2
16	Egil Otto Tobiasen	1

=== Finnish qualifying ===
- 25 September 1960
- (Finland) Eteläpuisto, Tampere
- First 5 (+seeded riders) to Nordic qualification 1961

Pos.	Rider	Points
1	Kalevi Lahtinen	15
2	Olavi Turunen	13
3	Timo Laine	11
4	Yrjö Vuorio	11
5	Antti Pajari	10
6	Antero Salasto	10
7	Ilkka Helminen	8
8	Esko Koponen	7
9	Pertti Petersohn	6
10	Martti Assinen	6
11	Raimo Orastie	5
12	Nils Staaf	5
13	Jan Ulfingman	4
14	Valle Seliverstov	4
15	Heikki Yli Orvola	3
16	Osmo Hokkanen	2

=== Swedish qualifying ===
- Top 15 to Nordic qualifying

Date	Venue	Winner	2nd	3rd
30 April	Vetlanda Motorstadion, Vetlanda	Ove Fundin	Rune Sörmander	Göran Norlen
1 May	Gamla Speedway Track, Visby	Ove Fundin	Björn Knutson	Arne Carlsson
4 May	Nya Ullevi, Gothenburg	Sören Sjösten	Rune Sörmander	Evert Andersson

Pos.	Rider	Points
1	Ove Fundin	30
2	Rune Sörmander	26
3	Björn Knutson	22
4	Evert Andersson	21
5	Arne Carlsson	21
6	Göran Norlén	19
7	Per-Tage Svensson	19
8	Sören Sjösten	19
9	Bert Lindarw	19
10	Joel Jansson	18
11	Leif Larsson	18
12	Göte Nordin	17
13	Bernt Nilsson	16
14	Åke Andersson	15
15	Curt Eldh	15

Pos.	Rider	Points
16	Olle Segerström	13
17	Inge Gustafsson	9
18	Göran Carlsson	7
19	Kjell Lutteman	7
20	Thore Kindstrand	6
21	Thorvald Karlsson	5
22	Curt Nyqvist	4
23	Kjell Svensson	3
24	Bo Magnusson	1
25	Per-Åke Lundgren	1
26	Hans Hallberg	0
27	Bengt Brannefors	0
28	Olle Andersson IV	0

=== British & Commonwealth qualifying ===
- Top 64 riders to British & Commonwealth 2nd Round

Date	Venue	Winner	2nd	3rd
22 May	County Ground, Exeter	Eric Hockaday	Jim Lightfoot	Pete Lansdale
24 May	Wimborne Road, Poole	Maury Mattingley	Tony Lewis	Ken Middleditch
25 May	Cleveland Park Stadium, Middlesbrough	Dick Campbell	Peter Vandenberg	Geoff Mudge
26 May	Monmore Green Stadium, Wolverhampton	Graham Warren	Harry Edwards	Eric Hockaday
26 May	Rayleigh Weir Stadium, Rayleigh	Johnny Fitzpatrick	Gil Goldfinch	Ken Adams
26 May	Pennycross Stadium, Plymouth	Jack Scott	Tony Lewis	Chris Julian
27 May	Old Meadowbank, Edinburgh	Jim Lightfoot	Doug Templeton	Dick Campbell
27 May	Dudley Wood Stadium, Dudley	Harry Bastable	Ivor Brown	Peter Vandenberg
1 June	Owlerton Stadium, Sheffield	Clive Featherby	Clive Cox	George Hunter
3 June	Hanley Greyhound Stadium, Hanley	Maury Mattingley	Ken Adams	Stan Stevens

=== Continental qualifying ===
- Top 32 to Continental semi-finals

Date	Venue	Winner	2nd	3rd
28 May	(Poland) Gwardia Sports Club Stadium, Poznań	(Czechoslovakia) Bohumír Bartoněk	(Czechoslovakia) Bedřich Slaný	(Poland) Stanisław Tkocz
28 May	(Czechoslovakia) Pavlovičky Stadion, Liberec	(Poland) Bronislaw Idzikowski	(Soviet Union) Farid Szajnurov	(Soviet Union) Igor Plekhanov
28 May	(Socialist Federal Republic of Yugoslavia) Matija Gubec Stadium, Krško	(Poland) Konstanty Pociejkewicz	(Czechoslovakia) Bohumil Rednek	(Poland) Henryk Żyto
28 May	(West Germany) Abensberger Stadion, Abensberg	(West Germany) Josef Hofmeister	(Poland) Marian Kaiser	(Czechoslovakia) Antonín Kasper Sr.

== Second round ==
=== British & Commonwealth 2nd round ===
- Top 32 riders to British & Commonwealth semi-finals

Date	Venue	Winner	2nd	3rd
3 July	Wimbledon Stadium, London	Ronnie Moore	Ron How	Jim Tebby
4 July	Banister Court Stadium, Southampton	Peter Craven	Barry Briggs	Ray Cresp
5 July	New Cross Stadium, London	Bob Andrews	Split Waterman	Ken McKinlay
6 July	Oxford Stadium, Oxford	Jack Young	Ronnie Genz	Mike Broadbanks
6 July	Foxhall Stadium, Ipswich	Peter Moore	Johnny Chamberlain	Ray Cresp
7 July	Leicester Stadium, Leicester	Ronnie Moore	Ken McKinlay	Danny Dunton
8 July	Abbey Stadium, Swindon	Cyril Maidment	Tadeusz Teodorowicz	Neil Street
8 July	Brandon Stadium, Coventry	Peter Moore	Bob Duckworth	Bob Andrews
8 July	The Firs Stadium, Norwich	Billy Bales	Mike Broadbanks	Split Waterman
8 July	Hyde Road, Manchester	Peter Craven	Gerald Jackson	Eric Williams

=== Nordic Qualifying ===
- 26 May
- (Norway) Dælenenga idrettspark, Oslo
- Top 8 to Nordic final

Pos.	Rider	Points
1	Ove Fundin	15
2	Björn Knutson	14
3	Aage Hansen	13
4	Arne Carlsson	12
5	Bernt Nilsson	11
6	Göran Norlén	11
7	Leif Larsson	
8	Joel Jansson	7
9	Reidar Kristoffersen	6
10	Kurt W Petersen	6
11	Sverre Harrfeldt	5
12	Torbjörn Nygaard	5
13	Paul Wissing	2
14	Nils Paulsen	2
15	Gunnar Skjetne	2
16	Jon Ödegaard	1

- 28 May
- (Finland) Helsinki Velodrome, Helsinki
- Top 8 to Nordic final

Pos.	Rider	Points
1	Per-Tage Svensson	14
2	Rune Sörmander	13
3	Arne Pander	12
4	Evert Andersson	11
5	Göte Nordin	11
6	Kalevi Lahtinen	10
7	Sören Sjösten	9
8	Rolf Westerberg	8
9	Timo Laine	7
10	Yrjö Vuorio	7
11	Antti Pajari	6
12	Åke Andersson	3
13	Curt Eldh	3
14	Bert Lindarw	3
15	Olavi Turunen	2
16	Esko Koponen	1

=== Continental semi-finals ===
- 17 June
- (Austria) Linzer Stadion, Linz
- Top 8 to Continental final

Pos.	Rider	Points
1	Josef Hofmeister	15
2	Antonín Kasper Sr.	13
3	Marian Kaiser	12
4	Konstanty Pociejkewicz	11
5	Stanislaw Rurarz	10
6	Bernard Kacperak	10
7	Henryk Zyto	8
8	Kazimierz Bentke	8
9	Valent Medved	7
10	Pawel Waloszek	6
11	Jan Malinowski	6
12	Bohumil Rendek	5
13	Zdeněk Dominik	4
14	Jaroslav Volf Jr.	4
15	Johan Hartl	1
16	Jaroslav Volf Sr.	0

- 18 June
- (Poland) Army Stadium, Warsaw
- Top 8 to Continental final

Pos.	Rider	Points
1	Stanislaw Tkocz	14
2	Mieczyslaw Polukard	13
3	Florian Kapala	13
4	Joachim Maj	12
5	Bronislaw Idzikowski	11
6	Igor Plekhanov	11
7	Bohumír Bartoněk	10
8	Bedřich Slaný	8
9	Stefan Kepa	7
10	Adolf Słaboń	4
11	Milan Špinka	4
12	Libor Dušánek	4
13	Jan Kusiak	2
14	Miloslav Ráliš	2
15	Stanislav Kubíček	2
16	Farid Szajnurov	2

== Third round ==
=== British & Commonwealth Semi finals ===
- Top 16 to British final

Date	Venue	Winner	2nd	3rd
31 July	Wimbledon Stadium, London	Ronnie Moore	Barry Briggs	Bob Andrews
1 August	Banister Court Stadium, Southampton	Ron How	Peter Craven	Cyril Maidment
5 August	Hyde Road, Manchester	Ronnie Moore	Doug Davies	Nigel Boocock
5 August	The Firs Stadium, Norwich	Barry Briggs	Peter Craven	Billy Bales

Pos.	Rider	Points
1	(New Zealand) Ronnie Moore	29
2	(New Zealand) Barry Briggs	29
3	(England) Peter Craven	28
4	(England) Cyril Maidment	24
5	(Australia) Peter Moore	22
6	(England) Bob Andrews	21
7	(Scotland) Ken McKinlay	21
8	(England) Mike Broadbank	21
9	(England) Ron How	20
10	(England) Nigel Boocock	19
11	(Australia) Jack Scott	19
12	(South Africa) Doug Davies	18
13	(Australia) Neil Street	18
14	(Australia) Jack Young	18
15	(England) Ronnie Genz	18
16	(Australia) Ray Cresp	17

Pos.	Rider	Points
17	(Australia) Johnny Chamberlain	16
18	(Australia) Chum Taylor	16
19	(England) Billy Bales	15
20	(England) Split Waterman	15
21	(England) Jimmy Squibb	9
22	(United Kingdom) Tadeusz Teodorowicz	8
23	(England) Dick Fisher	8
24	(Australia) Jack Biggs	7
25	(Australia) Jack Geran	7
26	(Wales) Eric Williams	7
27	(England) Jim Tebby	5
28	(England) Alby Golden	5
29	(England) Tony Lewis	4
30	(Wales) Ian Williams	4
31	(England) Nick Nicholls	4
32	(New Zealand) Bob Duckworth	0

=== Nordic Final ===
- 11 June 1961
- (Sweden) Gislaved Motorbana, Gislaved
- First 8 to European Final

Pos.	Rider	Total
1	(Sweden) Ove Fundin	14
2	(Denmark) Arne Pander	13
3	(Sweden) Björn Knutson	13
4	(Sweden) Per Tage Svensson	12
5	(Sweden) Evert Andersson	10
6	(Sweden) Göte Nordin	10
7	(Sweden) Leif Larsson	8
8	(Sweden) Rune Sörmander	8
9	(Sweden) Göran Norlén	7
10	(Sweden) Arne Carlsson	7
11	(Sweden) Soren Sjosten	6
12	(Sweden) Joel Jansson	5
13	(Sweden) Bernt Nilsson	3
14	(Finland) Timo Laine	2
15	(Norway) Rolf Westerberg	1
16	(Sweden) Curt Eldh	2
R1	(Norway) Aage Hansen	dnr
R1	(Finland) Kalevi Lahtinen	dnr

=== Continental Final ===
- 23 July 1961
- (Czechoslovakia) Slaný Speedway Stadium, Slaný
- First 7 to European Final, Josef Bössner seeded to European final

Placing	Rider	Total	1	2	3	4	5	6	7	8	9	10	11	12	13	14	15	16	17	18	19	20	Pts	Pos	21
1	(Poland) (2) Florian Kapała	14	3					3				3				2				3			14	1	
2	(Soviet Union) (1) Igor Plekhanov	14	2				3				3				3				3				14	2	
3	(Poland) (6) Stanisław Tkocz	12		2				2			2							3			3		12	3	
4	(Poland) (8) Henryk Żyto	10		3						1			3			1			2				10	4	
5	(West Germany) (7) Josef Hofmeister	9		1					3					3	0					2			9	5	
6	(Poland) (12) Konstanty Pociejkewicz	9			2					2		1			2						2		9	6	
7	(Poland) (4) Kaziemirz Bentke	8	1							X				2				2				3	8	7	
8	(Poland) (15) Marian Kaiser	7				3			2			2						X	-				7	8	
9	(Poland) (11) Mieczysław Połukard	7			X				1		1					3						2	7	9	
10	(Poland) (14) Joachim Maj	7				2		1					2		1							1	7	10	
11	(Czechoslovakia) (16) Antonín Kasper Sr.	7				1				3	0						2			1			7	11	
12	(Czechoslovakia) (10) Bedřich Slaný	6			3			0						1			1		1				6	12	
13	(Poland) (9) Stanislaw Rurarz	5			1		2						1					1		0			5	13	
14	(Poland) (3) Bronislaw Idzikowski	3	0						0				0				3				0		3	14	
15	(Czechoslovakia) (13) Bohumír Bartoněk	1				X	0							0		E					1		1	15	
16	(Poland) (5) Bernard Kacperak	1		0			1					E					0					0	1	16	
R1	(Poland) (R1) Stefan Kepa	0																					0	R1	
Placing	Rider	Total	1	2	3	4	5	6	7	8	9	10	11	12	13	14	15	16	17	18	19	20	Pts	Pos	21

m - exclusion for exceeding two minute time allowance • t - exclusion for touching the tapes • x - other exclusion • e - retired or mechanical failure • f - fell • ns - non-starter • nc - non-classify

gate A - inside	gate B	gate C	gate D - outside

== Fourth round ==
=== European Final ===
- 26 August 1961
- (Austria) Praterstadion, Vienna
- First 7 to World Final plus 1 reserve

Placing	Rider	Total	1	2	3	4	5	6	7	8	9	10	11	12	13	14	15	16	17	18	19	20	Pts	Pos	21
1	(Sweden) (8) Ove Fundin	15		3						3			3			3			3				15	1	
2	(Sweden) (11) Björn Knutson	14			3				3		3					2						3	14	2	
3	(Soviet Union) (3) Igor Plekhanov	11	3						2				1				3				2		11	3	
4	(Sweden) (4) Rune Sörmander	10	2							1				3				3				1	10	4	
5	(Poland) (6) Florian Kapała	10		2				3			2							2			1		10	5	
6	(Poland) (12) Stanisław Tkocz	10			1					0		3			3						3		10	6	
7	(Sweden) (15) Göte Nordin	9				3			1			2						1	2				9	7	
8	(West Germany) (16) Josef Hofmeister	9				2				2	1						1			3			9	8	
9	(Sweden) (5) Leif Larsson	8		1			2					1					2					2	8	9	
10	(Poland) (9) Henryk Żyto	7			2		3						2					F		-			7	10	
11	(Sweden) (2) Evert Andersson	6	1					2				0				1				2			6	11	
12	(Sweden) (10) Per Tage Svensson	3			0			1						2			0		0				3	12	
13	(Sweden) (14) Göran Norlén	2				0		0					0		2							0	2	13	
14	(Poland) (7) Mieczysław Połukard	1		0					0					1	-					-			1	14	
15	(Poland) (13) Marian Kaiser	1				1	F							E		E					0		1	15	
16	(Poland) (1) Kaziemirz Bentke	0	NS				NS				NS				NS				NS				0	16	
R1	(Austria) (R1) Josef Bössner	3					1								1					1			3	R1	
R2	(Austria) (R2) Johan Hartl	0	0																				0	R2	
Placing	Rider	Total	1	2	3	4	5	6	7	8	9	10	11	12	13	14	15	16	17	18	19	20	Pts	Pos	21

m - exclusion for exceeding two minute time allowance • t - exclusion for touching the tapes • x - other exclusion • e - retired or mechanical failure • f - fell • ns - non-starter • nc - non-classify

gate A - inside	gate B	gate C	gate D - outside

=== British Final ===
- 2 September 1961
- (England) Wembley Stadium, London
- First 9 to World final plus 1 reserve

Placing	Rider	Total	1	2	3	4	5	6	7	8	9	10	11	12	13	14	15	16	17	18	19	20	Pts	Pos	21
1	(New Zealand) (7) Barry Briggs	15		3					3					3	3					3			15	1	
2	(England) (3) Peter Craven	14	3						2				3				3				3		14	2	
3	(New Zealand) (12) Ronnie Moore	12			3					3		3			2						1		12	3	
4	(Scotland) (5) Ken McKinlay	9		0			3					2					1					3	9	4	
5	(England) (1) Ron How	9	2				2				2				0				3				9	5	
6	(England) (4) Bob Andrews	9	1							2				2				3				1	9	6	
7	(Australia) (16) Ray Cresp	8				1				1	3						2			1			8	7	
8	(England) (15) Mike Broadbanks	7				3			1			1						0	2				7	8	
9	(England) (14) Cyril Maidment	7				2		3					1		1							0	7	9	
10	(England) (9) Ronnie Genz	7			1		1						2					1		2			7	10	
11	(Australia) (6) Jack Young	7		1				1			1							2			2		7	11	
12	(South Africa) (11) Doug Davies	5			0				0		0					3						2	5	12	
13	(Australia) (8) Neil Street	5		2						0			0			2			1				5	13	
14	(Australia) (2) Peter Moore	3	0					2				1				0				0			3	14	
15	(Australia) (10) Jack Scott	2			2			0						0			0		0				2	15	
16	(England) (13) Nigel Boocock	1				0	0							1		0					0		1	16	
R1	(Australia) (R1) Chum Taylor	0																					0	R1	
R2	(England) (R2) Split Waterman	0																					0	R2	
Placing	Rider	Total	1	2	3	4	5	6	7	8	9	10	11	12	13	14	15	16	17	18	19	20	Pts	Pos	21

m - exclusion for exceeding two minute time allowance • t - exclusion for touching the tapes • x - other exclusion • e - retired or mechanical failure • f - fell • ns - non-starter • nc - non-classify

gate A - inside	gate B	gate C	gate D - outside

== World Final ==
- 15 September 1961
- (Sweden) Malmö Stadion, Malmö

Placing	Rider	Total	1	2	3	4	5	6	7	8	9	10	11	12	13	14	15	16	17	18	19	20	Pts	Pos	21
1	(Sweden) (6) Ove Fundin	14		3				3			3							3			2		14	1	
2	(Sweden) (4) Björn Knutson	12	3							3				3				F				3	12	2	3
3	(Sweden) (13) Göte Nordin	12				2	2							2		3					3		12	3	2
4	(New Zealand) (15) Barry Briggs	12				1			3			3						2	3				12	4	1
5	(England) (2) Bob Andrews	10	2					2				2				1				3			10	5	
6	(New Zealand) (16) Ronnie Moore	10				3				1	2						2			2			10	6	
7	(Poland) (3) Florian Kapała	8	0						2				2				3				1		8	7	
8	(Sweden) (7) Rune Sörmander	7		2					1					0	3					1			7	8	
9	(England) (9) Ron How	7			2		3						1					1		0			7	9	
10	(England) (8) Peter Craven	6		F						2			3			0			1				6	10	
11	(Scotland) (10) Ken McKinlay	5			3			F						1			1		E				5	11	
12	(England) (12) Cyril Maidment	4			1					0		1			2						0		4	12	
13	(Soviet Union) (1) Igor Plekhanov	4	1				0				1				0				2				4	13	
14	(Australia) (5) Ray Cresp	3		F			1					0					F					2	3	14	
15	(Poland) (11) Stanisław Tkocz	3			0				0		0					2						1	3	15	
16	(England) (14) Mike Broadbank	2				0		1					0		1							0	2	16	
R1	(Australia) (R1) Jack Young	0																					0	R1	
R2	(Sweden) (R2) Leif Larsson	0																					0	R2	
Placing	Rider	Total	1	2	3	4	5	6	7	8	9	10	11	12	13	14	15	16	17	18	19	20	Pts	Pos	21

m - exclusion for exceeding two minute time allowance • t - exclusion for touching the tapes • x - other exclusion • e - retired or mechanical failure • f - fell • ns - non-starter • nc - non-classify

gate A - inside	gate B	gate C	gate D - outside
