= 1965 Speedway World Team Cup =

6th edition of the annual motorcycle speedway World Cup competition

Seasons
- ← 1964 1966 →

1965 Speedway World Team Cup was the sixth edition of the FIM Speedway World Team Cup to determine the team world champions.

The final took place at the Illerstadion in Kempten, West Germany. The World Champion title was won by Poland.

== Format ==
Qualifying round
Olching, West Germany (details)
Poland | 39
Czechoslovakia | 32
West Germany | 21
Austria | 4
Meissen, East Germany (details)
Soviet Union | 45
Poland* | 25
East Germany | 13
East Germany II* | 11

Semifinals
Odense, Denmark (details)
Sweden | 45
Norway | 23
Finland | 19
Denmark | 9
Ufa, Soviet Union (details)
Poland | 37
Soviet Union | 30
Czechoslovakia | 27
East Germany | 2

Final
Kempten, West Germany (details)
Poland | 38
Sweden | 33
Great Britain** | 18
Soviet Union | 7

* Replacement teams not eligible to qualify
** Great Britain seeded to the final

== Qualification ==
=== Continental Semi-Final 1 ===
- 1 August
- (West Germany) Olching Speedwaybahn, Olching

| Pos. | National team | Pts. | Riders |
|---|---|---|---|
| 1st | Poland | 39 | Zbigniew Podlecki – 11; Jan Mucha – 10; Paweł Waloszek – 10; Joachim Maj – 8 |
| 2nd | Czechoslovakia | 32 | Luboš Tomíček Sr. – 10; Antonín Kasper Sr. – 8 Pavel Mares – 7 Jaroslav Volf – 7 Frantisek Ledecky – NS |
| 3rd | West Germany | 21 | Heinrich Sprenger – 6 Manfred Poschenreider – 5 Otto Lantenhammer – 5 Rainer Jüngling – 3 Fred Aberl – 2 |
| 4 | Austria | 4 | Kurt Schwingenschlögl – 2 Johann Kühr – 2 Alfred Rinzner – 0 Günther Walla – 0 |

=== Continental Semi-Final 2 ===
- 1 August
- (East Germany) Meissen Speedway Stadium, Meissen

| Pos. | National team | Pts. | Riders |
|---|---|---|---|
| 1st | Soviet Union | 48 | Igor Plekhanov – 12 (3,3,3,3); Gennady Kurilenko – 12 (3,3,3,3); Vladimir Sokolov – 12 (3,3,3,3); Yuri Chekranov – 9 Gabdrakhman Kadyrov – NS |
| 2nd | Poland* | 25 | Adolf Slabon – 9 Konstanty Pociejkewicz – 8 Bogdan Jaroszewicz – 5 Piotr Bruzda – 3 Wladislaw Wawszczyk – 0 |
| 3rd | East Germany | 13 | Jochen Dinse – 6 Jürgen Hehlert – 4 Hans Jürgen Fritz – 2 Heino Niemann – 1 Peter Liebing – 0 |
| 4 | East Germany II* | 11 | Bruno Bülau – 5 Günther Schelenz – 4 Jürgen Rudolph – 1 Peter Hehlert – 1 Jochen Hetmank – NS |

=== Scandinavian Round ===
- 14 May
- (Denmark) Odense Athletics Stadium, Odense

| Pos. | National team | Pts. | Riders |
|---|---|---|---|
| 1st | Sweden | 45 | Bengt Jansson – 12 (3,3,3,3); Bo Josefsson – 12 (3,3,3,3); Per Olof Söderman – 12 (3,3,3,3); Bjorn Knutson – 9 |
| 2nd | Norway | 23 | Henry Harrfeldt – 7 Per Aulie – 6 Sverre Harrfeldt – 6 Nils Paulsen – 4 |
| 3rd | Finland | 19 | Timo Laine – 8 Kalevi Lahtinen – 7 Matti Olin – 3 Olavi Turunen – 1 Heikki Kaprali – 0 |
| 4 | Denmark | 9 | Erik Kastebo – 5 Svend Nissen – 2 John S. Andersen – 1 Einar Hansen – 1 |

=== Continental Final ===
- 22 August
- (Soviet Union) Stroitel Stadium, Ufa

| Pos. | National team | Pts. | Riders |
|---|---|---|---|
| 1st | Poland | 37 | Andrzej Wyglenda – 11 (3,2,3,3); Andrzej Pogorzelski – 11 (3,3,3,2); Zbigniew Podlecki – 9 (2,3,3,1); Antoni Woryna – 6 (3,1,0,2); Paweł Waloszek – NS |
| 2nd | Soviet Union | 30 | Igor Plekhanov – 10 (3,2,2,3); Yuri Chekranov – 9 (2,3,2,2); Gennady Kurilenko – 5 (1,1,2,1); Viktor Trofimov – 5 (-,2,1,2); Vladimir Sokolov – 1 (1,-,-,-) |
| 3rd | Czechoslovakia | 27 | Jaroslav Volf – 10 (2,3,2,3); Luboš Tomíček Sr. – 7 (1,2,3,1); Antonín Kasper Sr. – 5 (0,1,1,3); Stanislav Kubíček – 5 (2,1,1,1); Pavel Mares – NS |
| 4 | East Germany | 2 | Jochen Dinse – 1 (0,0,1,0); Günther Schelenz – 1 (1,0,0,0); Hans-Jürgen Fritz – 0 (0,0,0,0); Jürgen Hehlert – 0 (0,0,0,0); Heino Niemann – NS |

== World final ==
- 5 September
- (West Germany) Illerstadion, Kempten

| Pos. | National team | Pts. | Riders |
|---|---|---|---|
| 1st | Poland | 38 | Andrzej Wyglenda – 11 (3,3,3,2); Andrzej Pogorzelski – 11 (3,3,3,2); Antoni Woryna – 9 (1,2,3,3); Zbigniew Podlecki – 7 (1,2,2,2); Paweł Waloszek – NS |
| 1st | Sweden | 34 | Bjorn Knutson – 11 (3,3,2,3); Ove Fundin – 8 (ef,3,2,3); Bengt Jansson – 8 (1,2,3,2); Göte Nordin – 6 (2,1,2,1); Leif Larsson – NS |
| 3rd | Great Britain | 18 | Ken McKinlay – 7 (2,1,1,3); Nigel Boocock – 6 (3,2,0,1); Jimmy Gooch – 3 (-,1,1,1); Barry Briggs – 1 (F,1,0,-); Charlie Monk – 1 (1,0,-,-) |
| 4 | Soviet Union | 7 | Gennady Kurilenko – 2 (2,0,0,0); Yuri Chekranov – 2 (2,r,-,-); Vladimir Sokolov – 2 (0,1,1,0); Igor Plekhanov – 1 (0,F,1,0); Viktor Trofimov – 0 (-,-,0,0) |

== See also ==
- 1965 Individual Speedway World Championship
