= 1964 Individual Speedway World Championship =

Motorcycle speedway world championship season

Seasons
- ← 1963 1965 →

The 1964 Individual Speedway World Championship was the 19th edition of the official World Championship to determine the world champion rider.

The final was held on 11 September at the Ullevi in Sweden.

New Zealander Barry Briggs secured his third world title with a five race 15 point maximum. Igor Plekhanov the Soviet Union captain won the silver medal after winning the ride off against four times champion Ove Fundin.

== First round ==
Qualification results.

=== Swedish qualifying ===
- Top 16 to Nordic qualifying

| Date | Venue | Winner | 2nd | 3rd |
|---|---|---|---|---|
| 26 April | Vetlanda Motorstadion, Vetlanda | Björn Knutson | Sören Sjösten | Arne Carlsson |
| 1 May | Gamla Speedway Track, Visby | Göte Nordin | Bernt Nilsson | Ove Fundin |
| 14 May | Hammarby IP, Stockholm | Björn Knutson | Sören Sjösten | Göte Nordin |

| Pos. | Rider | Points |
|---|---|---|
| 1 | Björn Knutson | 29 |
| 2 | Göte Nordin | 26 |
| 3 | Sören Sjösten | 26 |
| 4 | Ove Fundin | 23 |
| 5 | Arne Carlsson | 21 |
| 6 | Bernt Nilsson | 19 |
| 7 | Leif Larsson | 18 |
| 8 | Bengt Brannefors | 17 |
| 9 | Per-Olof Söderman | 16 |
| 10 | Willihard Thomsson | 16 |
| 11 | Gunnar Malmqvist | 16 |
| 12 | Hasse Holmqvist | 15 |

| Pos. | Rider | Points |
|---|---|---|
| 13 | Bo Magnusson | 15 |
| 14 | Bengt Jansson | 15 |
| 15 | Rune Sörmander | 13 |
| 16 | Per-Tage Svensson | 13 |
| 17 | Åke Andersson | 11 |
| 18 | Olle Nygren | 11 |
| 19 | Lars Jansson | 9 |
| 20 | Curt Eldh | 9 |
| 21 | Leif Enecrona | 9 |
| 22 | Inge Gustafsson | 7 |
| 23 | Sven Sigurd | 5 |
| 24 | Runo Wedin | 1 |

=== Norwegian qualifying ===
- 20 October 1963
- (Norway) Kadettangen, Sandvika
- Riders progress to Nordic qualification 1964

| Pos. | Rider | Points |
|---|---|---|
| 1 | Aage Hansen | 15 |
| 2 | Sverre Harrfeldt | 14 |
| 3 | Nils Paulsen | 13 |
| 4 | Reidar Eide | 11 |
| 5 | Cato Agnor | 10 |
| 6 | Henry Harrfeldt | 8 |
| 7 | Bjarne Sorenby | 8 |
| 8 | Olav Aaen | 7 |
| 9 | Johnny Faafeng | 7 |
| 10 | Per Jakob Aulie | 6 |

=== Finnish qualifying ===
- 19 July 1963
- (Finland) Kärpänen Speedway, Lahti
- Riders progress to Nordic qualification 1964

| Pos. | Rider | Points |
|---|---|---|
| 1 | Timo Laine | 15 |
| 2 | Kalevi Lahtinen | 14 |
| 3 | Matti Olin | 12 |
| 4 | Esko Koponen | 8 |
| 5 | Antero Salasto | 8 |
| 6 | Ilkka Helminen | 7 |
| 7 | Martti Assinen | 6 |
| 8 | Olavi Turunen | 6 |
| 9 | Veikko Metsahuone | 5 |
| 10 | Kari Ala Sippola | 5 |

=== Continental qualifying ===
- Top 32 to Continental semi-finals

| Date | Venue | Winner | 2nd | 3rd |
|---|---|---|---|---|
| 1 May | (East Germany) Gunter Harder Stadion, Neubrandenburg | (Poland) Andrzej Pogorzelski | (Soviet Union) Boris Samorodov | (Poland) Edmund Migoś |
| 1 May | (Czechoslovakia) Mšeno Speedway Stadium, Mšeno | (Czechoslovakia) Antonín Kasper Sr. | (Poland) Zbigniew Podlecki | (Czechoslovakia) Rudolf Havelka |
| 10 May | (Hungary) Borsod Volán Stadion, Miskolc | (Poland) Marian Rose | (Poland) Antoni Woryna | (Czechoslovakia) Bohumír Bartoněk |
| 10 May | (Socialist Federal Republic of Yugoslavia) Igralište na Kajzerici, Zagreb | (Poland) Andrzej Wyglenda | (Soviet Union) Witalij Szyło | (Soviet Union) Gennady Kurilenko |

== Second round ==
=== Nordic qualifying ===
- 31 May
- (Sweden) Gislaved Motorbana, Gislaved
- Top 8 to Nordic final

| Pos. | Rider | Points |
|---|---|---|
| 1 | Per-Olof Söderman | 14 |
| 2 | Sverre Harrfeldt | 12 |
| 3 | Ove Fundin | 11 |
| 4 | Göte Nordin | 11 |
| 5 | Bernt Nilsson | 11 |
| 6 | Rune Sörmander | 11 |
| 7 | Bengt Brannefors | 9 |
| 8 | Gunnar Malmqvist | 8 |
| 9 | Reidar Eide | 5 |
| 10 | Bo Magnusson | 5 |
| 11 | Olavi Turunen | 5 |
| 12 | Jonny Faafeng | 4 |
| 13 | Poul Wissing | 4 |
| 14 | Henry Harrfeldt | 4 |
| 15 | Per Jakob Aulie | 3 |
| 16 | Niels Paulsen | 1 |

- 31 May
- (Finland) Kärpänen Speedway, Lahti
- Top 8 to Nordic final

| Pos. | Rider | Points |
|---|---|---|
| 1 | Björn Knutson | 14 |
| 2 | Arne Carlsson | 12 |
| 3 | Per-Tage Svensson | 12 |
| 4 | Sören Sjösten | 12 |
| 5 | Hasse Holmqvist | 11 |
| 6 | Leif Larsson | 11 |
| 7 | Willihard Thomsson | 9 |
| 8 | Bengt Jansson | 8 |

=== Continental semi-finals ===
- 6 June
- (Soviet Union) Army Sports Club Stadium, Lviv
- Top 8 to Continental final

| Pos. | Rider | Points |
|---|---|---|
| 1 | Andrzej Wyglenda | 13 |
| 2 | Andrzej Pogorzelski | 12 |
| 3 | Gennadij Kurilenko | 12 |
| 4 | Stanislav Kubíček | 10 |
| 5 | Boris Samorodov | 9 |
| 6 | Jaroslav Volf | 9 |
| 7 | Konstantin Krishtal | 9 |
| 8 | Miroslav Šmíd | 9 |
| 9 | Pavel Mareš | 9 |
| 10 | Edmund Migoś | 7 |
| 11 | Władimir Sokołow | 7 |
| 12 | Paweł Waloszek | 5 |
| 13 | Jochen Dinse | 4 |
| 14 | Marian Kaiser | 3 |
| 15 | Witalij Szyło | 2 |
| 16 | Václav Průša | 1 |

- 7 June
- (Poland) Army Stadium, Warsaw
- Top 8 to Continental final

| Pos. | Rider | Points |
|---|---|---|
| 1 | Antoni Woryna | 15 |
| 2 | Zbigniew Podlecki | 12 |
| 3 | Igor Plechanov | 11 |
| 4 | Marian Rose | 11 |
| 5 | Joachim Maj | 11 |
| 6 | Jurij Chekranov | 10 |
| 7 | Antonín Kasper Sr. | 9 |
| 8 | Rudolf Havelka | 9 |
| 9 | Kazimierz Bentke | 8 |
| 10 | Gabdrakhman Kadyrov | 6 |
| 11 | Viktor Kuznetsov | 6 |
| 12 | Valentin Moiseev | 4 |
| 13 | František Ledecký | 3 |
| 14 | Antonín Šváb Sr. | 3 |
| 15 | Miloslav Wagner | 2 |
| 16 | Bohumír Bartoněk | 0 |

== Third round ==
=== British & Commonwealth Qualifying ===
- Top 16 to British & Commonwealth Final

| Date | Venue | Winner | 2nd | 3rd |
|---|---|---|---|---|
| 21 June | Rye House Stadium, Hoddesdon | Les Owen | Tich Read | Sándor Lévai |
| 18 July | Abbey Stadium, Swindon | Brian Brett | Jimmy Gooch | Barry Briggs |
| 23 July | Oxford Stadium, Oxford | Ron How | Ken McKinlay | Jimmy Gooch |
| 25 July | Brandon Stadium, Coventry | Bryan Elliott | Mike Broadbank | Bob Andrews |
| 27 July | Wimbledon Stadium, London | Ron How | Bob Andrews | Nigel Boocock |
| 1 August | Hyde Road, Manchester | Barry Briggs | Cyril Maidment | Trevor Hedge |
| 1 August | The Firs Stadium, Norwich | Brian Brett | Nigel Boocock | Jim Lightfoot |
| 4 August | West Ham Stadium, London | Barry Briggs | Brian Brett | Nigel Boocock |

| Pos. | Rider | Points |
|---|---|---|
| 1 | (England) Brian Brett | 43 |
| 2 | (New Zealand) Barry Briggs | 42 |
| 3 | (England) Nigel Boocock | 39 |
| 4 | (New Zealand) Bob Andrews | 38 |
| 5 | (England) Mike Broadbank | 37 |
| 6 | (England) Cyril Maidment | 36 |
| 7 | (England) Ron How | 34 |
| 8 | (Scotland) Ken McKinlay | 32 |
| 9 | (England) Dick Fisher | 32 |
| 10 | (England) Trevor Hedge | 31 |
| 11 | (England) Bryan Elliott | 30 |
| 12 | (England) Jim Lightfoot | 30 |
| 13 | (United Kingdom) Tadeusz Teodorowicz | 30 |
| 14 | (England) Ron Mountford | 30 |
| 15 | (England) Jimmy Gooch | 29 |
| 16 | (England) Billy Bales | 28 |
| 17 | (England) Ronnie Genz | 26 |

| Pos. | Rider | Points |
|---|---|---|
| 18 | (England) Colin Gooddy | 26 |
| 19 | (Wales) Leo McAuliffe | 25 |
| 20 | (England) Norman Hunter | 22 |
| 21 | (Scotland) Gordon McGregor | 21 |
| 22 | (England) Martin Ashby | 20 |
| 23 | (England) Alf Hagon | 19 |
| 24 | (Australia) Ray Cresp | 16 |
| 25 | (England) Gerry Jackson | 15 |
| 26 | (England) Reg Luckhurst | 15 |
| 27 | (England) Rick France | 12 |
| 28 | (England) Reg Trott | 11 |
| 29 | (England) Les Owen | 11 |
| 30 | (England) John Debbage | 11 |
| 31 | (Australia) Jack Geran | 10 |
| 32 | (England) Bob Dugard | 8 |
| 33 | (Hungary) Sándor Lévai | 8 |
| 34 | (England) Tich Read | 5 |

=== Nordic Final ===
- 14 June 1964
- (Denmark) Odense Athletics Stadium, Odense
- First 8 to European Final plus 1 reserve

| Pos. | Rider | Total |
|---|---|---|
| 1 | (Sweden) Björn Knutson | | 15 |
| 2 | (Sweden) Ove Fundin | 14 |
| 3 | (Sweden) Göte Nordin | 11 |
| 4 | (Sweden) Arne Karlson | 10 |
| 5 | (Sweden) Per Olof Söderman | 10 |
| 6 | (Sweden) Rune Sörmander | 9 |
| 7 | (Sweden) Per Tage Svensson | 9 |
| 8 | (Sweden) Sören Sjösten | 8 |
| 9 | (Sweden) Gunnar Malmqvist | 8 |
| 10 | (Sweden) Leif Larsson | 7 |
| 11 | (Sweden) Hasse Holmqvist | 5 |
| 12 | (Sweden) Bernt Nilsson | 4 |
| 13 | (Sweden) Willihard Thomsson | 3 |
| 14 | (Sweden) Bengt Jansson | 3 |
| 15 | (Sweden) Bengt Brannefors | 2 |
| 16 | (Norway) Sverre Harrfeldt | 2 |

=== Continental Final ===
- 20 June 1964
- (Czechoslovakia) Slaný Speedway Stadium, Slaný
- First 8 to European Final plus 1 reserve

| Placing | Rider | Total | 1 | 2 | 3 | 4 | 5 | 6 | 7 | 8 | 9 | 10 | 11 | 12 | 13 | 14 | 15 | 16 | 17 | 18 | 19 | 20 | Pts | Pos |
|---|---|---|---|---|---|---|---|---|---|---|---|---|---|---|---|---|---|---|---|---|---|---|---|---|
| 1 | (Soviet Union) (10) Igor Plekhanov | 13 | | | 3 | | | 3 | | | | | | 3 | | | 2 | | 2 | | | | 13 | 1 |
| 2 | (Czechoslovakia) (11) Jaroslav Volf | 12 | | | 1 | | | | 3 | | 2 | | | | | 3 | | | | | | 3 | 12 | 2 |
| 3 | (Soviet Union) (12) Boris Samorodov | 12 | | | 2 | | | | | 3 | | 2 | | | 2 | | | | | | 3 | | 12 | 3 |
| 4 | (Poland) (2) Zbigniew Podlecki | 11 | 1 | | | | | 2 | | | | 3 | | | | 2 | | | | 3 | | | 11 | 4 |
| 5 | (Soviet Union) (16) Yuri Chekranov | 10 | | | | 3 | | | | 0 | 3 | | | | | | 3 | | | 1 | | | 10 | 5 |
| 6 | (Soviet Union) (7) Gennady Kurilenko | 10 | | 3 | | | | | 2 | | | | | 2 | 1 | | | | | 2 | | | 10 | 6 |
| 7 | (Czechoslovakia) (15) Antonín Kasper Sr. | 9 | | | | 2 | | | 0 | | | 1 | | | | | | 3 | 3 | | | | 9 | 7 |
| 8 | (Poland) (4) Andrzej Wyglenda | 8 | 3 | | | | | | | 2 | | | | 0 | | | | 1 | | | | 2 | 8 | 8 |
| 9 | (Czechoslovakia) (1) Stanislav Kubíček | 8 | 2 | | | | 1 | | | | 1 | | | | 3 | | | | 1 | | | | 8 | 9 |
| 10 | (Poland) (3) Marian Rose | 6 | 0 | | | | | | 1 | | | | 2 | | | | 1 | | | | 2 | | 6 | 10 |
| 11 | (Poland) (9) Andrzej Pogorzelski | 5 | | | 0 | | 2 | | | | | | 3 | | | | | 0 | | 0 | | | 5 | 11 |
| 12 | (Poland) (13) Antoni Woryna | 5 | | | | 0 | 3 | | | | | | | 1 | | 1 | | | | | 0 | | 5 | 12 |
| 13 | (Czechoslovakia) (6) Miroslav Šmíd | 5 | | 1 | | | | 1 | | | 0 | | | | | | | 2 | | | 1 | | 5 | 13 |
| 14 | (Czechoslovakia) (5) Rudolf Havelka | 3 | | 2 | | | 0 | | | | | 0 | | | | | 0 | | | | | 1 | 3 | 14 |
| 15 | (Poland) (14) Joachim Maj | 2 | | | | 1 | | 0 | | | | | 1 | | 0 | | | | | | | 0 | 2 | 15 |
| 16 | (Soviet Union) (8) Konstantin Kristal | 1 | | 0 | | | | | | 1 | | | 0 | | | 0 | | | 0 | | | | 1 | 16 |
| R1 | (Czechoslovakia) (R1) Pavel Mareš | 0 | | | | | | | | | | | | | | | | | | | | | 0 | R1 |
| R2 | (Czechoslovakia) (R2) František Ledecký | 0 | | | | | | | | | | | | | | | | | | | | | 0 | R2 |
| R3 | (Czechoslovakia) (R3) Milan Wágner | 0 | | | | | | | | | | | | | | | | | | | | | 0 | R3 |
| Placing | Rider | Total | 1 | 2 | 3 | 4 | 5 | 6 | 7 | 8 | 9 | 10 | 11 | 12 | 13 | 14 | 15 | 16 | 17 | 18 | 19 | 20 | Pts | Pos |

m - exclusion for exceeding two minute time allowance • t - exclusion for touching the tapes • x - other exclusion • e - retired or mechanical failure • f - fell • ns - non-starter • nc - non-classify

| gate A - inside | gate B | gate C | gate D - outside |

== Fourth round ==
=== British & Commonwealth Final ===
- Top 8 to World Final
- 29 August 1964
- (England) Wembley Stadium, London
- First 8 to World Final plus 1 reserve

| Placing | Rider | Total | 1 | 2 | 3 | 4 | 5 | 6 | 7 | 8 | 9 | 10 | 11 | 12 | 13 | 14 | 15 | 16 | 17 | 18 | 19 | 20 | Pts | Pos | 21 |
|---|---|---|---|---|---|---|---|---|---|---|---|---|---|---|---|---|---|---|---|---|---|---|---|---|---|
| 1 | (New Zealand) (15) Barry Briggs | 15 | | | | 3 | | | 3 | | | 3 | | | | | | 3 | 3 | | | | 15 | 1 | |
| 2 | (Scotland) (9) Ken McKinlay | 14 | | | 3 | | 3 | | | | | | 3 | | | | | 2 | | 3 | | | 14 | 2 | |
| 3 | (England) (7) Ron How | 12 | | 3 | | | | | 2 | | | | | 3 | 2 | | | | | 2 | | | 12 | 3 | |
| 4 | (England) (6) Cyril Maidment | 11 | | 1 | | | | 3 | | | 3 | | | | | | | 1 | | | 3 | | 11 | 4 | |
| 5 | (England) (16) Mike Broadbanks | 11 | | | | 2 | | | | 3 | 2 | | | | | | 3 | | | 1 | | | 11 | 5 | |
| 6 | (New Zealand) (3) Bob Andrews | 10 | 3 | | | | | | 1 | | | | 2 | | | | 2 | | | | 2 | | 10 | 6 | |
| 7 | (England) (8) Nigel Boocock | 8 | | 2 | | | | | | 1 | | | 0 | | | 3 | | | 2 | | | | 8 | 7 | |
| 8 | (England) (5) Dick Fisher | 7 | | F | | | 2 | | | | | 1 | | | | | 1 | | | | | 3 | 7 | 8 | |
| 9 | (England) (2) Jim Lightfoot | 6 | 2 | | | | | 0 | | | | 2 | | | | 2 | | | | 0 | | | 6 | 9 | |
| 10 | (England) (12) Trevor Hedge | 5 | | | 2 | | | | | 2 | | 0 | | | 0 | | | | | | 1 | | 5 | 10 | |
| 11 | (England) (4) Ron Mountford | 5 | 1 | | | | | | | 0 | | | | 2 | | | | 0 | | | | 2 | 5 | 11 | |
| 12 | (England) (10) Jimmy Gooch | 4 | | | 0 | | | 2 | | | | | | 1 | | | 0 | | 1 | | | | 4 | 12 | |
| 13 | (Australia) (14) Bryan Elliott | 4 | | | | F | | 1 | | | | | 1 | | 1 | | | | | | | 1 | 4 | 13 | |
| 14 | (England) (11) Billy Bales | 3 | | | 1 | | | | 0 | | 1 | | | | | 1 | | | | | | 0 | 3 | 14 | |
| 15 | (England) (1) Brian Brett | 2 | 0 | | | | X | | | | 0 | | | | 2 | | | | 0 | | | | 2 | 15 | |
| 16 | (United Kingdom) (13) Tadeusz Teodorowicz | 2 | | | | 1 | 1 | | | | | | | 0 | | 0 | | | | | 0 | | 2 | 16 | |
| R1 | (England) (R1) Ronnie Genz | 0 | | | | | | | | | | | | | | | | | | | | | 0 | R1 | |
| R2 | (England) (R2) Colin Gooddy | 0 | | | | | | | | | | | | | | | | | | | | | 0 | R2 | |
| Placing | Rider | Total | 1 | 2 | 3 | 4 | 5 | 6 | 7 | 8 | 9 | 10 | 11 | 12 | 13 | 14 | 15 | 16 | 17 | 18 | 19 | 20 | Pts | Pos | 21 |

m - exclusion for exceeding two minute time allowance • t - exclusion for touching the tapes • x - other exclusion • e - retired or mechanical failure • f - fell • ns - non-starter • nc - non-classify

| gate A - inside | gate B | gate C | gate D - outside |

=== European Final ===
- 28 June 1964
- (Poland) Olympic Stadium, Wrocław
- First 8 to World Final plus 1 reserve

| Placing | Rider | Total | 1 | 2 | 3 | 4 | 5 | 6 | 7 | 8 | 9 | 10 | 11 | 12 | 13 | 14 | 15 | 16 | 17 | 18 | 19 | 20 | Pts | Pos |
|---|---|---|---|---|---|---|---|---|---|---|---|---|---|---|---|---|---|---|---|---|---|---|---|---|
| 1 | (Poland) (10) Zbigniew Podlecki | 15 | | | 3 | | | 3 | | | | | | 3 | | | 3 | | 3 | | | | 15 | 1 |
| 2 | (Sweden) (5) Björn Knutson | 13 | | 3 | | | 2 | | | | | 3 | | | | | 2 | | | | | 3 | 13 | 2 |
| 3 | (Soviet Union) (3) Boris Samorodov | 11 | 3 | | | | | | 3 | | | | 3 | | | | 1 | | | | 1 | | 11 | 3 |
| 4 | (Sweden) (8) Ove Fundin | 11 | | 2 | | | | | | 3 | | | 1 | | | 3 | | | 2 | | | | 11 | 4 |
| 5 | (Soviet Union) (12) Igor Plekhanov | 11 | | | 2 | | | | | 2 | | 2 | | | 3 | | | | | | 2 | | 11 | 5 |
| 6 | (Poland) (6) Andrzej Wyglenda | 10 | | 0 | | | | 2 | | | 2 | | | | | | | 3 | | | 3 | | 10 | 6 |
| 7 | (Czechoslovakia) (11) Jaroslav Volf | 10 | | | 1 | | | | 2 | | 3 | | | | | 2 | | | | | | 2 | 10 | 7 |
| 8 | (Soviet Union) (9) Gennady Kurilenko | 9 | | | 0 | | 3 | | | | | | 2 | | | | | 2 | | 2 | | | 9 | 8 |
| 9 | (Sweden) (7) Göte Nordin | 6 | | 1 | | | | | 1 | | | | | 1 | 2 | | | | | 1 | | | 6 | 9 |
| 10 | (Sweden) (16) Rune Sörmander | 6 | | | | 2 | | | | 0 | 1 | | | | | | 0 | | | 3 | | | 6 | 10 |
| 11 | (Czechoslovakia) (13) Antonín Kasper Sr. | 6 | | | | 3 | 0 | | | | | | | 2 | | 1 | | | | | 0 | | 6 | 11 |
| 12 | (Sweden) (4) Per Tage Svensson | 3 | 2 | | | | | | | 1 | | | | 0 | | | | 0 | | | | 0 | 3 | 12 |
| 13 | (Sweden) (2) Sören Sjösten | 3 | 1 | | | | | 1 | | | | 1 | | | | 0 | | | | 0 | | | 3 | 13 |
| 14 | (Soviet Union) (15) Yuri Chekranov | 2 | | | | 1 | | | 0 | | | 0 | | | | | | 1 | 0 | | | | 2 | 14 |
| 15 | (Sweden) (1) Arne Karlson | 2 | 0 | | | | 1 | | | | 0 | | | | 0 | | | | 1 | | | | 2 | 15 |
| 16 | (Sweden) (14) Per Olof Söderman | 2 | | | | 0 | | 0 | | | | | 0 | | 1 | | | | | | | 1 | 2 | 16 |
| R1 | (Czechoslovakia) (R1) Stanislav Kubíček | 0 | | | | | | | | | | | | | | | | | | | | | 0 | R1 |
| R2 | (Sweden) (R2) Gunnar Malmqvist | 0 | | | | | | | | | | | | | | | | | | | | | 0 | R2 |
| Placing | Rider | Total | 1 | 2 | 3 | 4 | 5 | 6 | 7 | 8 | 9 | 10 | 11 | 12 | 13 | 14 | 15 | 16 | 17 | 18 | 19 | 20 | Pts | Pos |

m - exclusion for exceeding two minute time allowance • t - exclusion for touching the tapes • x - other exclusion • e - retired or mechanical failure • f - fell • ns - non-starter • nc - non-classify

| gate A - inside | gate B | gate C | gate D - outside |

== World Final ==
- 11 September 1964
- (Sweden) Ullevi, Gothenburg

| Placing | Rider | Total | 1 | 2 | 3 | 4 | 5 | 6 | 7 | 8 | 9 | 10 | 11 | 12 | 13 | 14 | 15 | 16 | 17 | 18 | 19 | 20 | Pts | Pos | 21 |
|---|---|---|---|---|---|---|---|---|---|---|---|---|---|---|---|---|---|---|---|---|---|---|---|---|---|
| 1 | (New Zealand) (6) Barry Briggs | 15 | | 3 | | | | 3 | | | 3 | | | | | | | 3 | | | 3 | | 15 | 1 | |
| 2 | (Soviet Union) (14) Igor Plekhanov | 13 | | | | 3 | | 2 | | | | | 3 | | 3 | | | | | | | 2 | 13 | 2 | 3 |
| 3 | (Sweden) (5) Ove Fundin | 13 | | 2 | | | 3 | | | | | 2 | | | | | 3 | | | | | 3 | 13 | 3 | 2 |
| 4 | (Soviet Union) (15) Boris Samorodov | 11 | | | | 1 | | | 3 | | | 3 | | | | | | 2 | 2 | | | | 11 | 4 | |
| 5 | (Sweden) (9) Björn Knutson | 10 | | | 3 | | 2 | | | | | | 1 | | | | | 1 | | 3 | | | 10 | 5 | |
| 6 | (England) (16) Ron How | 10 | | | | 2 | | | | 3 | 2 | | | | | | 2 | | | 1 | | | 10 | 6 | |
| 7 | (England) (1) Cyril Maidment | 8 | 2 | | | | 1 | | | | 1 | | | | 1 | | | | 3 | | | | 8 | 7 | |
| 8 | (Soviet Union) (3) Gennady Kurilenko | 7 | 3 | | | | | | 2 | | | | F | | | | 1 | | | | 1 | | 7 | 8 | |
| 9 | (England) (2) Nigel Boocock | 6 | 0 | | | | | 1 | | | | 0 | | | | 3 | | | | 2 | | | 6 | 9 | |
| 10 | (England) (10) Mike Broadbank | 6 | | | 2 | | | E | | | | | | 3 | | | E | | 1 | | | | 6 | 10 | |
| 11 | (Scotland) (12) Ken McKinlay | 6 | | | 1 | | | | | E | | 1 | | | 2 | | | | | | 2 | | 6 | 11 | |
| 12 | (Poland) (13) Andrzej Wyglenda | 4 | | | | 0 | 0 | | | | | | | 2 | | 2 | | | | | 0 | | 4 | 12 | |
| 13 | (New Zealand) (4) Bob Andrews | 4 | 1 | | | | | | | 2 | | | | 1 | | | | 0 | | | | 0 | 4 | 13 | |
| 14 | (Poland) (8) Zbigniew Podlecki | 3 | | 0 | | | | | | 1 | | | 2 | | | 0 | | | 0 | | | | 3 | 14 | |
| 15 | (Czechoslovakia) (11) Jaroslav Volf | 3 | | | 0 | | | | 1 | | 0 | | | | | 1 | | | | | | 1 | 3 | 15 | |
| 16 | (England) (7) Dick Fisher | 1 | | 1 | | | | | 0 | | | | | 0 | E | | | | | 0 | | | 1 | 16 | |
| R1 | (England) (R1) Jim Lightfoot | 0 | | | | | | | | | | | | | | | | | | | | | 0 | R1 | |
| R2 | (Sweden) (R2) Göte Nordin | 0 | | | | | | | | | | | | | | | | | | | | | 0 | R2 | |
| Placing | Rider | Total | 1 | 2 | 3 | 4 | 5 | 6 | 7 | 8 | 9 | 10 | 11 | 12 | 13 | 14 | 15 | 16 | 17 | 18 | 19 | 20 | Pts | Pos | 21 |

m - exclusion for exceeding two minute time allowance • t - exclusion for touching the tapes • x - other exclusion • e - retired or mechanical failure • f - fell • ns - non-starter • nc - non-classify

| gate A - inside | gate B | gate C | gate D - outside |
