= Björn Knutson =

Swedish speedway rider

- Born: 27 April 1938 (age 88); Norrköping, Sweden
- Nationality: Swedish

Career history

Sweden
- 1957–1966: Vargarna

Great Britain
- 1959–1963: Southampton Saints
- 1964: West Ham Hammers

Individual honours
- 1965: World Champion
- 1962, 1963: European Champion
- 1962, 1964: Nordic Champion
- 1961, 1963: Swedish Champion
- 1965: European Long Track Champion
- 1960, 1962, 1963: Pride of the East winner
- 1964: The Laurels

Team honours
- 1960, 1962, 1963, 1964: World Team Cup
- 1962: National League Champion
- 1961: National League KO Cup Winner
- 1961: National Trophy Winner
- 1960, 1961: Allsvenskan Champion
- 1964: Allsvenskan Div 2 Champion

Björn Knutson commonly spelt Knutsson (born 27 April 1938 in Sweden) is a former motorcycle speedway rider who won the Speedway World Championship in 1965 and was a four-time winner of the World Team Cup. He gained the nickname 'The Crown Prince' for his speedway success. He earned 42 caps for the Sweden national speedway team.

== Career ==
Knutson also won the Speedway Swedish Individual Championship in 1961 and 1963.

Knutson first rode in Great Britain after signing for Southampton Saints, during the 1959 Speedway National League. He topped the team's averages in 1960 and became one of the league's leading riders during the period. He outscored his teammate New Zealand's Barry Briggs at Southampton in both 1962 and 1963, at a time when Briggs was in the middle of winning his four world championships. He finished his British league career with West Ham Hammers, at the end of the 1964 Speedway National League season.

== World Final Appearances ==
=== Individual World Championship ===
- 1961 - (Sweden) Malmö, Malmö Stadion - 2nd - 12pts + 3pts
- 1962 - (England) London, Wembley Stadium - 4th - 10pts + 2pts
- 1963 - (England) London, Wembley Stadium - 2nd - 13pts
- 1964 - (Sweden) Gothenburg, Ullevi - 5th - 10pts
- 1965 - (England) London, Wembley Stadium - Winner - 14pts
- 1966 - (Sweden) Gothenburg, Ullevi - 10th - 5pts

=== World Team Cup ===
- 1960 - (Sweden) Gothenburg, Ullevi (with Ove Fundin / Rune Sörmander / Olle Nygren) - Winner - 44pts (9)
- 1961 - (Poland) Wrocław, Olympic Stadium (with Rune Sörmander / Ove Fundin / Per Tage Svensson / Soren Sjosten) - 2nd - 30pts (7)
- 1962 - (Czechoslovakia) Slaný, Slaný Speedway Stadium (with Ove Fundin / Sören Sjösten / Göte Nordin / Rune Sörmander) - Winner - 36pts (10)
- 1963 - (Austria) Vienna, Stadion Wien (with Ove Fundin / Per Olof Söderman / Göte Nordin / Rune Sörmander) - Winner - 37pts (11)
- 1964 - (West Germany) Abensberg, Abensberg Stadion (with Ove Fundin / Göte Nordin / Rune Sörmander / Sören Sjösten) - Winner - 34pts (11)
- 1965 - (West Germany) Kempten (with Ove Fundin / Bengt Jansson / Göte Nordin) - 2nd - 33pts (11)
- 1966 - (Poland) Wrocław, Olympic Stadium (with Ove Fundin / Leif Enecrona / Göte Nordin / Leif Larsson) - 3rd - 22pts (11)
