= Göte Nordin =

Swedish speedway rider

- Born: 2 July 1935; Hofors, Sweden
- Died: 21 November 2023 (aged 88); Falun, Sweden
- Nationality: Swedish

Career history

Sweden
- 1952-1954: Vikingarna
- 1955-1958, 1960-1967: Getingarna
- 1968-1971: Kaparna
- 1972-1973: Smederna

Great Britain
- 1960: Belle Vue Aces
- 1962: Norwich Stars
- 1964: Wimbledon Dons
- 1966: Newport Wasps
- 1967-1969: Poole Pirates
- 1969: Coventry Bees
- 1971: Wembley Lions
- 1972: Halifax Dukes

Individual honours
- 1965, 1971: Swedish Championship
- 1970: Nordic Champion
- 1961: Speedway World Championship bronze medal
- 1966, 1967: Internationale

Team honours
- 1962, 1963, 1964, 1967: World Team Cup
- 1963, 1964, 1965, 1966, 1967, 1968, 1970, 1973: Allsvenskan Champion
- 1953, 1962: Allsvenskan Div 2 Champion
- 1960: Britannia Shield

Göte Nordin (2 July 1935 – 21 November 2023) was a former motorcycle speedway rider from Sweden. He earned 45 caps for the Sweden national speedway team.

== Speedway career ==
Nordin was a two times champion of Sweden, winning the Swedish Championship in 1965 and 1971. He reached the final of the Speedway World Championship on four occasions (1961, 1962, 1963 and 1966), finishing third in the 1961 Individual Speedway World Championship.

Nordin helped Sweden win the World Team Cup in 1962, 1963, 1964 and 1967. He won the Swedish League title on eight occasions with three clubs.

Nordin won the 1971 Swedish final after Anders Michanek refused to pariticpate in a re-run for the title and was disqualified. Both riders finished on 14 points and in the race-off Michanek beat Nordin after the latter pulled out of the race, claiming that he saw a red light to stop the race. The match referee ordered a re-run but Michanek refused to take part claiming there was no red light. The incident resulted in violence between rival supporters and was headline news in Sweden.

Nordin rode in the top tier of British Speedway from 1966 until 1972, riding for various clubs despite problems with restrictions for overseas riders in the league. He rode for Belle Vue Aces, Norwich Stars, Wimbledon Dons, Newport Wasps, Poole Pirates, Coventry Bees, Wembley Lions and Halifax Dukes.

== World Final Appearances ==
=== Individual World Championship ===
- 1961 - (Sweden) Malmö, Malmö Stadion - 3rd - 12pts + 2pts
- 1962 - (England) London, Wembley Stadium - 8th - 9pts
- 1963 - (England) London, Wembley Stadium - 5th - 10pts
- 1964 - (Sweden) Gothenburg, Ullevi - Reserve - Did not ride
- 1966 - (Sweden) Gothenburg, Ullevi - 6th - 9pts
- 1971 - (Sweden) Gothenburg, Ullevi - Reserve - Did not ride

=== World Team Cup ===
- 1962 - (West Germany) Slaný (with Ove Fundin / Sören Sjösten / Björn Knutson / Rune Sörmander) - Winner - 36pts (4)
- 1963 - (Austria) Vienna, Stadion Wien (with Ove Fundin / Per Olof Söderman / Björn Knutson / Rune Sörmander) - Winner - 37pts (6)
- 1964 - (West Germany) Abensberg, Abensberg Stadion (with Ove Fundin / Björn Knutson / Rune Sörmander / Sören Sjösten) - Winner - 34pts (10)
- 1965 - (West Germany) Kempten, Illerstadion (with Ove Fundin / Bengt Jansson / Björn Knutson) - 2nd - 33pts (6)
- 1966 - (Poland) Wrocław, Olympic Stadium (with Ove Fundin / Leif Enecrona / Björn Knutson / Leif Larsson) - 3rd - 22pts (3)
- 1967 - (Sweden) Malmö, Malmö Stadion (with Ove Fundin / Bengt Jansson / Torbjörn Harrysson) - Winner - 32pts (11)
- 1972 - (West Germany) Olching, Olching Speedwaybahn (with Tommy Jansson / Anders Michanek / Christer Lofqvist / Jan Simensen) 4th - 18pts (1)

=== World Pairs Championship ===
- 1969* - (Sweden) Stockholm, Gubbängens IP (with Ove Fundin) - 2nd - 27pts (12)

* Unofficial World Championships.
