= Igor Plekhanov =

Soviet speedway rider

- Born: 26 July 1933
- Died: 2 August 2007 (aged 74)

Career history

Soviet Union
- 1959–1968: Ufa

Individual honours
- 1964, 1965: World Championship silver
- 1964: Continental champion
- 1960, 1961, 1963, 1965, 1968: Soviet Champion
- 1960, 1961, 1962: Russian champion

Igor Alexandrovich Plekhanov (Russian: Игорь Александрович Плеханов; 26 July 1933 in Ufa, Russian SFSR – 2 August 2007) was a Soviet speedway rider who finished second in the Speedway World Championship in 1964 and 1965.

== History ==
Plekhanov was the first Soviet rider to appear in a Speedway World Championship world final during the 1961 Individual Speedway World Championship. He would go on to finish runner-up in the world championship in both 1964 and in 1965, when he defeated four times champion Ove Fundin in the silver medal run-off.

Plekhanov was a five-times Soviet Champion in 1960, 1961, 1963, 1965 and 1968 Additionally, he won the first three editions of the Russian national championship from 1960 to 1962. In 1964, he was part of the Soviet Union team that toured Britain for the first time. and later that year, he reached his third world final; the 1964 Individual Speedway World Championship held on 11 September at the Ullevi in Sweden. He captained the national team the following year in 1965 as part of the Soviet Union national team.

Plekhanov later coached the Soviet Union national speedway team from 1970 until 1972.

== World Final appearances ==
=== Individual World Championship ===
- 1961 - (Sweden) Malmö, Malmö Stadion - 13th - 4pts
- 1962 - (England) London, Wembley Stadium - 10th - 7pts
- 1964 - (Sweden) Gothenburg, Ullevi - 2nd - 13pts
- 1965 - (England) London, Wembley Stadium - 2nd - 13pts
- 1966 - (Sweden) Göteborg, Ullevi - 8th - 8pts
- 1967 - (England) London, Wembley Stadium - 4th - 12pts
- 1968 - (Sweden) Göteborg, Ullevi - Reserve - Did not ride

=== World Team Cup ===
- 1964 - (West Germany) Abensberg, Abensberg Stadion (with Boris Samorodov / Gennady Kurilenko / Yuri Chekranov) - 2nd - 25pts (8)
- 1965 - (West Germany) Kempten (with Yuri Chekranov / Gennady Kurilenko / Vladimir Sokolov / Viktor Trofimov) - 4th - 7pts (1)
- 1966 - (Poland) Wrocław, Olympic Stadium (with Viktor Trofimov / Boris Samorodov / Farid Szajnurov) - 2nd - 25pts (6)
- 1967 - (Sweden) Malmö, Malmö Stadion (with Boris Samorodov / Gabdrakhman Kadyrov / Viktor Trofimov / Farid Szajnurov) - 3rd= - 19pts (9)
