= Zbigniew Podlecki =

Polish speedway rider

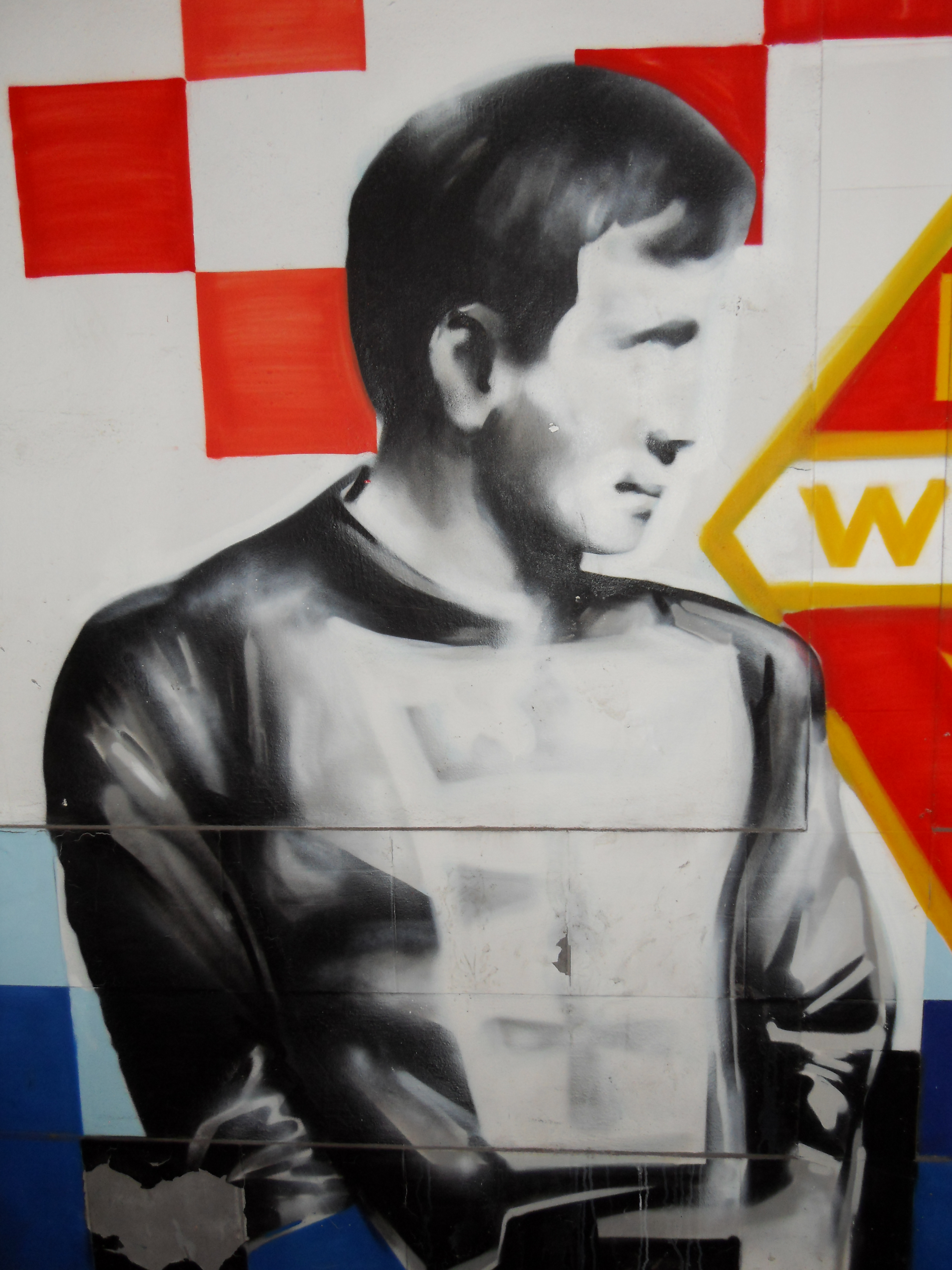
- Born: 19 January 1940; Vilnius, Lithuania
- Died: 8 January 2009 (aged 68); Gdańsk, Poland
- Nationality: Polish

Career history

Poland
- 1958-1972: Gdańsk

Individual honours
- 1964: European Champion

Team honours
- 1965: World Team Cup

Zbigniew Podlecki (19 January 1940 – 8 January 2009) was a Polish motorcycle speedway rider who won Team World Champion title in 1965. He was born in Vilnius, Lithuania.

== Career ==
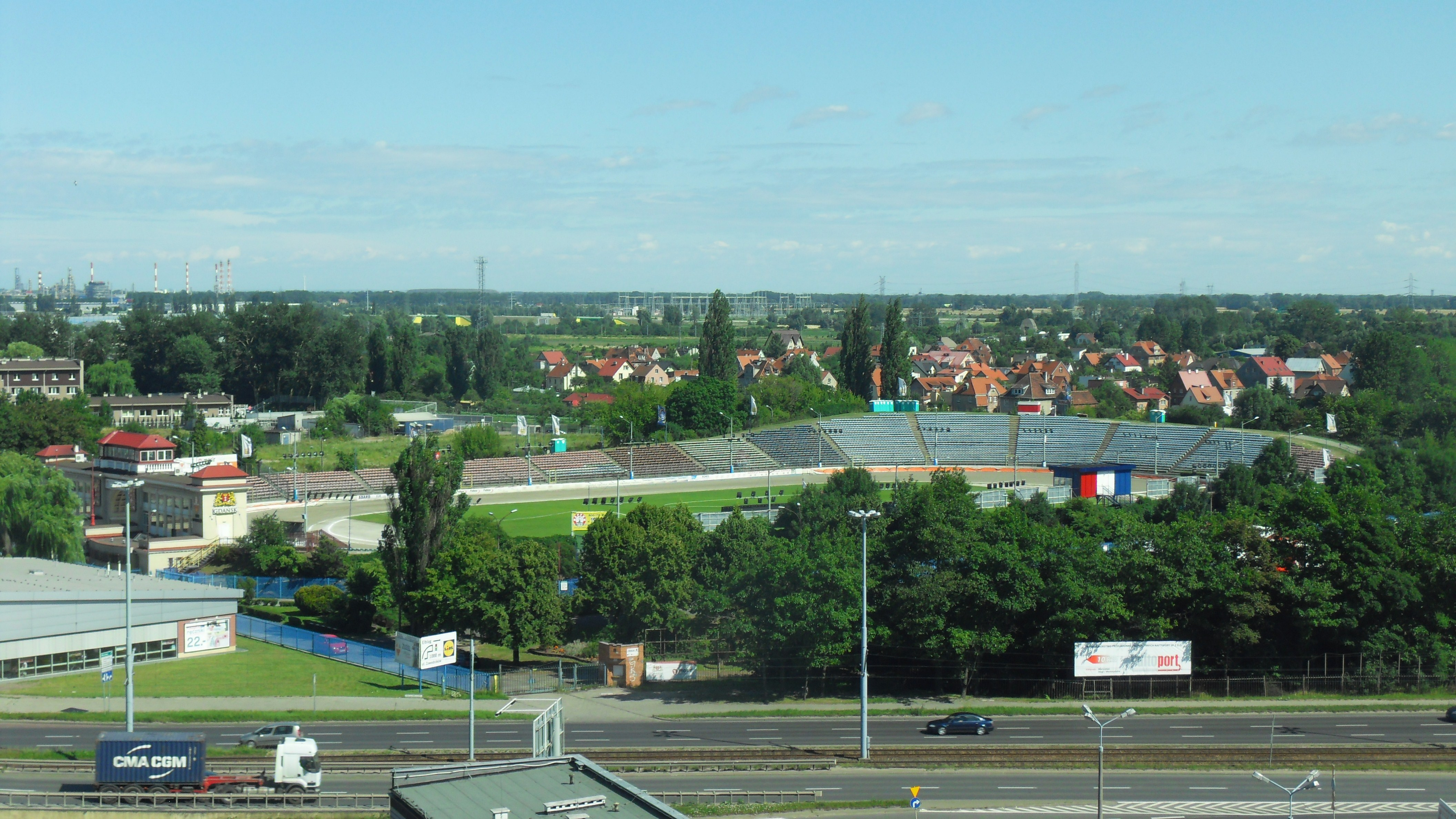
The stadium named after him

Podlecki began riding as a 19-year-old, during the 1959 Polish speedway season for LPŻ Neptun Gdańsk. The team then became Legia Gdańsk and he helped them to a second place finish in the top division of the Polish leagues. In 1962, the team became Wybrzeże Gdańsk, for which it is still known today.

Podlecki was called up to the Poland national speedway team in 1964 and also in 1964 he won the Individual Speedway European Championship in Wrocław, before reaching the World final in Gothenburg. The following year, he helped Poland win the 1965 Speedway World Team Cup. Podlecki toured the United Kingdom with the Polish national team in 1966.

Podlecki's career ended during the 1972 Polish speedway season, when on 19 August, returning from his parents house he had a car accident after trying to avoid a pedestrian who had run out into the road. The crash left him with paralysis from the waist down.

Podlecki died in Gdańsk in January 2009 and after a resolution of the Gdańsk City Council and with the agreement of his team Wybrzeże Gdańsk, the stadium was renamed in his honour and it is now called the Zbigniew Podlecki Stadium.

== World Final Appearances ==
=== Individual World Championship ===
- 1964 - (Sweden) Gothenburg, Ullevi - 14th - 3pts
- 1969 - (England) London, Wembley Stadium - Reserve - 3pts

=== World Team Cup ===
- 1964 - (West Germany) Abensberg, Abensberg Stadion (with Andrzej Pogorzelski / Andrzej Wyglenda / Marian Kaiser / Marian Rose) - 4th - 16pts (3)
- 1965 - (West Germany) Kempten (with Andrzej Wyglenda / Antoni Woryna / Andrzej Pogorzelski) - Winner - 28pts (7)
- 1967 - (Sweden) Malmö, Malmö Stadion (with Jerzy Trzeszkowski / Andrzej Pogorzelski / Andrzej Wyglenda / Antoni Woryna) - 2nd - 26pts (3)

== See also ==
- Poland national speedway team
- Speedway in Poland
