= Valeri Klementiev =

Soviet Union motorcycle speedway rider

- Born: 5 August 1946; Lipetsk, Soviet Union
- Died: 7 April 1971 (aged 24); Zelenokumsk, Soviet Union
- Nationality: Russian

Career history

Soviet Union
- 1968–1970: Tbilisi

Individual honours
- 1969: Speedway World Championship finalist
- 1969: European Champion
- 1969: Soviet championship silver

Valeri Klementiev (5 August 1946 – 7 April 1971) was a Russian speedway rider. He represented the Soviet Union.

== Speedway career ==
Klementiev became a European Champion, after winning the gold medal at the 1969 European Final. He also reached the final of the Speedway World Championship in the 1969 Individual Speedway World Championship.

Klemetiev won the silver medal at the Soviet Union championship in 1969 and also won the European final in 1969. He qualified for the European final and then the world final as part of the 1970 Individual Speedway World Championship.

Klementiev was killed at a young age during a race on 7 April 1971 in Russia.

== World final appearances ==
=== Individual World Championship ===
- 1969 – (England) London, Wembley Stadium – 13th – 4pts
- 1970 - (Poland) Wrocław, Olympic Stadium - 6th - 8pts

=== World Team Cup ===
- 1969 - (Poland) Rybnik, Rybnik Stadium (with Viktor Trofimov / Vladimir Smirnov / Gennady Kurilenko / Yury Dubinin) - 3rd - 23pts (5)

== See also ==
- Rider deaths in motorcycle speedway
