= Yury Dubinin (speedway rider) =

Soviet speedway rider

- Born: Soviet Union
- Nationality: Russian

Career history

Soviet Union
- 1967–1991: Novosibirsk

Individual honours
- 1969: Soviet Champion
- 1969: Russian champion

Team honours
- 1969: Speedway World Team Cup bronze medal

Yury Dubinin is a Soviet former international speedway rider.

== Speedway career ==
Dubinin was twice a Soviet junior champion and was the Champion of the Soviet Union in 1969. Dubinin completed the double by winning the Russian national championship in 1969.

Also in 1969, Dubinin won a bronze medal at the Speedway World Team Cup in the 1969 Speedway World Team Cup. He qualified for the European final as part of the 1970 Individual Speedway World Championship.

== World final appearances ==
=== World Team Cup ===
- 1969 - (Poland) Rybnik, Rybnik Municipal Stadium (with Viktor Trofimov / Vladimir Smirnov / Gennady Kurilenko / Valeri Klementiev) - 3rd - 23pts (1)

=== Individual Ice Speedway World Championship ===
- 1970 - (Sweden) Nässjö, 6th - 9pts
- 1972 – (Sweden) Nässjö, 10th – 6pts

== Family ==
Dubinin's brother Vyacheslav won the silver medal at the 1967 Individual Ice Speedway World Championship and both of Yury's sons Igor and Vladimir were speedway riders.
