= Viktor Trofimov =

Soviet speedway rider (1938–2013)

- Born: 22 March 1938; Leningrad, Soviet Union
- Died: 1 October 2013 (aged 75); Rivne, Ukraine
- Nationality: Soviet

Career history

Soviet Union
- 1967–1979: Rivne

Individual honours
- 1972, 1975: Speedway World Championship finalist
- 1972: Continental champion
- 1967: Soviet Champion

Team honours
- 1966, 1971, 1972, 1975: World Team Cup silver

Viktor Ivanovich Trofimov (Russian: Виктор Иванович Трофимов) (22 March 1938 – 1 October 2013) was a Soviet international speedway rider.

== Career ==
Trofimov born in Leningrad, Soviet Union. reached the final of the Speedway World Championship in 1972 and 1975.

Trofimov also finished on the rostrum of the World Team Cup nine times between 1965 and 1976 but never won a gold medal. He achieved four silver (1966, 1971, 1972, 1975) and three bronze (1967, 1969, 1973) medals. In 1965, he toured the United Kingdom as part of the Soviet Union national team, it was only the second ever tour of the UK by the Soviet Union.

Trofimov was the champion of the Soviet Union, winning the title in 1967. He won the Continental Speedway final in 1972.

In the speedway team championship of the USSR, Trofimov rode for 18 years for the team Rivne and won two bronze medals. His first race was on 30 April 1960 and last was on 15 October 1995. After the dissolution of the Soviet Union, Trofimov remained in Ukraine and his son Vladimir Trofimov and grandson Viktor Trofimov Jr. would both go on to represent the Ukraine national speedway team. He toured the United Kingdom with the Soviet team in 1976.

In September 2011, a book was published about the sports career of Trofimov titled English "RADUGA" Viktor Trofimov.

== World Final appearances ==
=== Individual World Championship ===
- 1972 - (England) London, Wembley Stadium - 9th - 6pts
- 1975 - (England) London, Wembley Stadium - 8th - 8pts

=== World Team Cup ===
- 1965 - (West Germany) Kempten (with Yuri Chekranov / Gennady Kurilenko / Vladimir Sokolov / Igor Plekhanov) - 4th - 7pts (0)
- 1966 - (Poland) Wrocław, Olympic Stadium (with Boris Samorodov / Igor Plekhanov / Farid Szajnurov) - 2nd - 25pts (6)
- 1967 - (Sweden) Malmö, Malmö Stadion (with Igor Plekhanov / Boris Samorodov / Farid Szajnurov) - 3rd= - 19pts (4)
- 1969 - (Poland) Rybnik, Rybnik Municipal Stadium (with Gennady Kurilenko / Vladimir Smirnov / Valeri Klementiev / Yury Dubinin) - 3rd - 23pts (0)
- 1971 - (Poland) Wroclaw, Olympic Stadium (with Grigory Khlinovsky / Vladimir Gordeev / Vladimir Smirnov / Anatoly Kuzmin) - 2nd - 22pts - Reserve -
- 1972 - (West Germany) Olching, (with Anatoly Kuzmin / Grigory Khlinovsky / Viktor Kalmykov) - 2nd - 21 + 7 pts (5 + 1)
- 1973 - (England) London, Wembley Stadium (with Aleksandr Pavlov / Vladimir Gordeev / Vladimir Paznikov / Grigory Khlinovsky) - 3rd - 20pts (2)
- 1975 - (West Germany) Norden, Motodrom Halbemond (with Vladimir Gordeev / Valery Gordeev / Grigory Khlinovsky) – 2nd – 29pts (8)
- 1976 - (England) London, White City Stadium (with Valery Gordeev / Grigory Khlinovsky / Vladimir Gordeev) - 4th - 11pts (0)

* 1967 - No run-off was held for 3rd place. Bronze medals were awarded to both Great Britain and Soviet Union
