= Gennady Kurilenko =

Soviet Union/Ukrainian motorcycle speedway rider

- Born: c. 1944; Lviv, Soviet Union
- Died: 16 February 2013
- Nationality: Soviet Union / Ukrainian

Career history

Soviet Union
- 1962, 1967–1970, 1974–1975: Ufa
- 1963–1966: Lviv
- 1971–1973: Balakovo

Individual honours
- 1964: Speedway World Championship finalist
- 1968: Continental Champion
- 1970: Soviet Champion

Gennady Kurilenko (c. 1944 – 16 February 2013) was a Ukrainian speedway rider. He represented the Soviet Union.

== Speedway career ==
Kurilenko reached the final of the Speedway World Championship in the 1964 Individual Speedway World Championship by virtue of qualifying through the Continenetal rounds at Zagreb, Lviv and Slaný.

Kurilenko was the champion of the Soviet Union, winning the title in 1970. He had previously won the Continental Speedway final in 1968.

In 1964, Kurilenko was part of the Soviet Union team that toured Britain for the first time and was a metal craftsman by trade at the time and later that year he reached his first world final; the 1964 Individual Speedway World Championship, held on 11 September at the Ullevi in Sweden. In 1965, he toured the United Kingdom as part of the Soviet Union national team again.

== World final appearances ==
=== Individual World Championship ===
- 1964 – (Sweden) Gothenburg, Ullevi – 8th – 7pts
- 1968 – (Sweden) Gothenburg, Ullevi - 4th - 11pts + 2pts
- 1970 – (Poland) Wrocław, Olympic Stadium - 14th - 2pts

=== World Team Cup ===
- 1964 – (West Germany) Abensberg, Abensberg Stadion (with Boris Samorodov / Igor Plekhanov / Yuri Chekranov) - 2nd - 25pts (8)
- 1965 – (West Germany) Kempten (with Yuri Chekranov / Igor Plekhanov / Vladimir Sokolov / Viktor Trofimov) - 4th - 7pts (2)
- 1969 – (Poland) Rybnik, Rybnik Stadium (with Viktor Trofimov / Vladimir Smirnov / Valeri Klementiev / Yury Dubinin) - 3rd - 23pts (8)
