= Farid Szajnurov =

Soviet Union motorcycle speedway rider

- Born: Soviet Union
- Nationality: Russian

Career history

Soviet Union
- 1959–1971: Ufa

Individual honours
- 1959, 1966: Soviet Champion
- 1966: Russian champion

Team honours
- 1966: World Cup silver medal
- 1967: World Cup bronze medal

Farid Szajnurov is a former international speedway rider from the Soviet Union.

== Speedway career ==
Szajnurov won a silver medal at the Speedway World Team Cup in the 1966 Speedway World Team Cup. The following year, he was part of the Soviet team that won the bronze medal at the 1967 Speedway World Team Cup.

Szajnurov was the first Champion of the Soviet Union in 1959 and later won the title a second time in 1966. He also won the Russian national championship in 1966.

== World final appearances ==
=== World Team Cup ===
- 1966 - (Poland) Wrocław, Olympic Stadium (with Boris Samorodov / Igor Plekhanov / Viktor Trofimov) - 2nd - 25pts (4)
- 1967 - (Sweden) Malmö, Malmö Stadion (with Boris Samorodov / Gabdrakhman Kadyrov / Viktor Trofimov / Igor Plekhanov) - 3rd= - 19pts (1)
