= Yuri Chekranov =

Soviet speedway rider

- Born: 31 October 1943; Ufa, Soviet Union
- Died: 16 December 2021 (aged 78); Ufa, Russia
- Nationality: Russian

Career history

Soviet Union
- 1963: Ufa

Individual honours
- 1963: Russian champion

Team honours
- 1964: Speedway World Team Cup silver medal

Yuri Andreevich Chekranov (Russian: Юрий Андреевич Черканов; 31 October 1943 – 16 December 2021) was an international speedway rider from the Soviet Union.

== Speedway career ==
In 1963, Chekranov won the Russian national championship.

Chekranov reached the final of the Speedway World Team Cup in the 1964 Speedway World Team Cup where he won a silver medal.

In 1964, Chekranov was part of the Soviet Union team that toured Britain for the first time and was a motor mechanic by trade at the time.

In 1965, Chekranov toured the United Kingdom as part of the Soviet Union national team again.

== World final appearances ==
=== World Team Cup ===
- 1964 - (West Germany) Abensberg Stadion, Abensberg (with Boris Samorodov / Igor Plekhanov / Gennady Kurilenko) - 2nd - 25pts (6)
- 1965 - (West Germany) Illerstadion, Kempten (with Gennady Kurilenko / Igor Plekhanov / Vladimir Sokolov / Viktor Trofimov) - 4th - 7pts (2)

=== Individual Ice Speedway World Championship ===
- 1966 (Soviet Union) 2 rounds, 4th
