= Vladimir Sokolov (speedway rider) =

Soviet speedway rider

- Nationality: Soviet Union (Ukrainian)

Career history

Soviet Union
- 1959–1962: Ufa
- 1963–1969: Salavat

Team honours
- 1965: Speedway World Team Cup finalist

Vladimir Sokolov is a former international speedway rider from the Ukrainian SSR, Soviet Union.

== Speedway career ==
Sokolov reached the final of the Speedway World Team Cup in the 1965 Speedway World Team Cup.

Sokolov twice won the bronze medal at the Soviet Union championship in 1965 and 1966.

In 1965, Sokolov toured the United Kingdom as part of the Soviet Union national team, it was only the second ever tour of the UK by the Soviet Union.

== World final appearances ==
=== World Team Cup ===
- 1965 - (West Germany) Kempten (with Yuri Chekranov / Igor Plekhanov / Gennady Kurilenko / Viktor Trofimov) - 4th - 7pts (2)
