= Wack Hofmeister Stadium =

Stadium in Abensberg, Germany

- Location: Stadionstraße 17, 93326 Abensberg, Germany
- Coordinates: 48°49′04″N 11°51′08″E
- Length: 0.398 km

The Wack Hofmeister Stadium formerly the Altes Stadion Abensberg (the Old Stadium) is a motorcycle speedway and association football stadium located slightly east of the centre of Abensberg in Germany.

It hosts the speedway team MSC Abensberg and the football team TSV Abensberg 1862.

== History ==
The stadium has hosted international matches for the West Germany national speedway team and in 1964, held the Speedway World Team Cup final.

Also referred to as the Motorstadion Abensberg, the venue hosted the 1985 Individual Speedway Junior European Championship. It was won by Per Jonsson on 14 July 1985, who later became a world champion. The most prestigious speedway event to be held at the track was the first ever Speedway Grand Prix of Germany in 1995, which formed part of the World Championship. The 1995 Speedway Grand Prix of Germany was won by the Dane Tommy Knudsen.

In 2022, the stadium was renamed in honour of former speedway rider Josef Hofmeister (nicknamed Wack Hofmeister).
