= 1967 British League season =

British speedway season

- League: British League
- Season: 1967
- No. of competitors: 19
- Champions: Swindon Robins
- Knockout Cup: Coventry Bees
- Individual: Barry Briggs
- London Cup: West Ham Hammers
- Midland Cup: Swindon Robins
- Highest average: Barry Briggs

The 1967 British League season was the 33rd season of the top tier of speedway in the United Kingdom and the third season known as the British League.

== Summary ==
The league was made up of the same 19 teams that competed in the previous year. Swindon Robins led by the world champion Barry Briggs won their first top-tier league title but were pushed all the way by Coventry Bees and West Ham Hammers. Swindon finished with four riders with averages over eight, Briggs topped the entire league with 11.05 but the contributions from Martin Ashby (8.83), Bob Kilby (8.61) and Mike Broadbank (8.55) were pivotal in the Swindon's success. Coventry Bees gained some consolation for finishing runner-up two seasons running by winning the Knockout Cup.

== Final table ==
		M	W	D	L	F	A	Pts
1	Swindon Robins	36	24	0	12	1536	1266	48
2	Coventry Bees	36	22	2	12	1524	1275	46
3	West Ham Hammers	36	21	3	12	1514	1288	45
4	Edinburgh Monarchs	36	20	2	14	1485	1318	42
5	Hackney Hawks	36	20	1	15	1402	1400	41
6	Poole Pirates	36	17	3	16	1462	1339	37
7	Halifax Dukes	36	18	1	17	1456	1347	37
8	Wolverhampton Wolves	36	18	1	17	1423	1376	37
9	Sheffield Tigers	36	18	1	17	1333.5	1470.5	37
10	Newcastle Diamonds	36	18	0	18	1386	1417	36
11	Wimbledon Dons	36	16	3	17	1392	1409	35
12	Newport Wasps	36	17	1	18	1387	1413	35
13	Glasgow Tigers	36	16	2	18	1343	1457	34
14	Oxford Cheetahs	36	16	1	19	1368.5	1432.5	33
15	Exeter Falcons	36	16	0	20	1384.5	1418.5	32
16	Belle Vue Aces	36	16	0	20	1333.5	1463.5	32
17	Long Eaton Archers	36	14	3	19	1322	1481	31
18	Cradley Heath Heathens	36	12	0	24	1262	1533	24
19	King's Lynn Stars	36	11	0	25	1297	1505	22

M = Matches; W = Wins; D = Draws; L = Losses; Pts = Total Points

== Fixtures & results ==
Home \ Away	BV	COV	CH	ED	EX	GLA	HAC	HAL	KL	LE	ND	NW	OX	PP	SHE	SWI	WH	WIM	WOL
Belle Vue Aces		43–35	48–30	35–43	43–35	47–31	46–31	45–33	46–32	34–44	47–31	44–32	39–38	40–38	37–41	43–35	34–43	40–38	45–33
Coventry Bees	44–31		56–22	48–30	46–32	56–22	51–27	56–22	57–21	44–34	54–24	41–36	57–21	46–32	54–24	37–41	47–31	44–34	44–33
Cradley Heathens	54–24	36–41		34–44	47–30	37–41	44–34	36–42	39–39	45–33	37–41	35–43	38–39	40–37	42–36	46–31	42–35	46–32	41–37
Edinburgh Monarchs	56–22	49–29	59–19		55–23	38–40	45–33	45–33	49–28	46–32	47–31	50–28	47–31	45–32	50–28	50–28	39–39	46–31	45–33
Exeter Falcons	41–36	36–42	54–24	51–27		50–28	49–29	43–35	50–28	46–32	51–27	38–40	50–28	47–31	61–17	48–30	42–36	42–36	44–34
Glasgow Tigers	36–41	42–35	46–32	41–37	42–34		48–30	43–35	48–30	50–28	36–42	43–34	44–34	39–39	49–29	35–43	32–46	40–38	57–21
Hackney Hawks	45–33	42–36	48–30	42–35	50–28	39–39		43–35	54–24	42–36	46–31	44–34	40–38	44–34	49–29	45–33	41–37	57–21	53–25
Halifax Dukes	47–31	39–39	38–39	42–36	49–29	45–33	43–35		61–17	43–35	54–24	60–18	52–26	52–26	46–32	42–36	48–29	52–26	44–34
King's Lynn Stars	53–24	47–31	47–31	36–42	48–29	42–35	35–43	45–33		55–23	43–35	35–42	44–34	44–34	36–42	46–32	34–44	43–35	38–40
Long Eaton Archers	42–36	32–46	50–28	40–38	52–26	38–40	44–34	40–38	40–38		40–38	41–36	45–33	40–38	47–31	41–37	39–39	39–39	39–39
Newcastle Diamonds	43–35	51–27	40–38	45–32	45–33	56–22	58–20	34–44	43–35	40–38		47–31	44–33	40–38	49–29	32–46	54–24	46–32	40–38
Newport Wasps	42–36	39–39	55–22	38–40	43–35	44–34	56–22	41–37	49–29	50–28	45–33		50–28	37–41	53–25	38–40	41–37	46–32	52–26
Oxford Cheetahs	44–34	38–39	51–27	45–33	47.5–30.5	41–36	55–23	55–23	47–31	46–32	49–29	56–22		39–39	44–34	46–32	43–34	36–42	40–38
Poole Pirates	38–40	48–30	45–33	39–39	42–36	48–30	43–34	47–31	57–21	57–21	45–33	45–33	52–25		48–30	48–30	46–31	40–38	41–37
Sheffield Tigers	43.5–34.5	41–37	48–27	59–19	53–25	44–34	46–32	43–35	45–33	47–31	41–37	47–31	42–36	41–37		43–35	33–45	39–39	40–37
Swindon Robins	51–27	47–31	44–33	46–32	56–22	52–26	55–23	52–26	44–34	47–31	53–24	52–26	53–25	42–35	51–27		50–28	47–31	45–33
West Ham Hammers	53–25	48–30	52–26	51–27	48–30	51–27	37–40	46–32	42–36	45–33	49–28	60–18	52–26	44–34	54–24	44–34		43–35	43–35
Wimbledon Dons	41–37	35–42	43–35	46–32	45–33	43–34	42–36	44–33	42–36	42–35	43–35	48–29	43–35	42–36	47–31	38–39	39–39		52–26
Wolverhampton Wolves	47–31	45–33	51–27	40–38	47–31	58–20	38–39	46–32	51–27	48–27	42–36	43–35	49–28	45–32	49–29	42–35	43–35	40–38	

Legend: Blue = home team win; Yellow = draw; Red = away team win.

== Top Ten Riders (League averages) ==
	Rider	Nat	Team	C.M.A.
1	Barry Briggs	(New Zealand)	Swindon	11.05
2	Charlie Monk	(Australia)	Glasgow	10.72
3	Nigel Boocock	(England)	Coventry	10.43
4	Ray Wilson	(England)	Long Eaton	10.43
5	Eric Boocock	(England)	Halifax	10.38
6	Sverre Harrfeldt	(Norway)	West Ham	10.30
7	Torbjörn Harrysson	(Sweden)	Newport	10.05
8	Gote Nordin	(Sweden)	Poole	10.00
9	Bengt Jansson	(Sweden)	Hackney	9.86
10	Terry Betts	(England)	King's Lynn	9.70

== Knockout Cup ==
The cup was won by Coventry Bees.

== Riders' Championship ==
Barry Briggs won the British League Riders' Championship for the third consecutive year, held at Hyde Road on 21 October.

Pos.	Rider	Heat Scores	Total
1	(New Zealand) Barry Briggs	3 3 3 3 3	15
2	(England) Nigel Boocock	2 3 3 3 3	14
3	(England) Ray Wilson	3 3 3 2 1	12
4	(Sweden) Torbjörn Harrysson	2 0 3 3 2	10
5	(England) Eric Boocock	3 3 2 2 0	10
6	(New Zealand) Ivan Mauger	1 2 2 3 2	10
7	(Sweden) Olle Nygren	1 2 2 1 3	9
8	(Sweden) Bengt Jansson	3 1 0 1 3	8
9	(Sweden) Göte Nordin	1 1 2 2 0	6
10	(Sweden) Ove Fundin	2 0 0 2 2	6
11	(Australia) Charlie Monk	2 0 1 1 2	6
12	(Australia) Jim Airey	ef 2 1 1 1	5
13	(Scotland) Ken McKinlay	0 2 1 0 1	4
14	(England) Terry Betts	1 1 1 0 1	4
15	(New Zealand) Wayne Briggs	0 1 0 r n	1
16	(England) Roy Trigg	0 0 0 0 0	0
17	(England) Brian Brett (res)	0 - - - -	0

- ef=engine failure, f=fell, exc=excluded

== Final leading averages ==
	Rider	Nat	Team	C.M.A.
1	Barry Briggs	(New Zealand)	Swindon	11.05
2	Nigel Boocock	(England)	Coventry	10.52
3	Charlie Monk	(Australia)	Glasgow	10.50
4	Ray Wilson	(England)	Long Eaton	10.43
5	Eric Boocock	(England)	Halifax	10.29
6	Sverre Harrfeldt	(Norway)	West Ham	10.25
7	Torbjörn Harrysson	(Sweden)	Newport	10.05
8	Göte Nordin	(Sweden)	Poole	9.99
9	Bengt Jansson	(Sweden)	Hackney	9.87
10	Terry Betts	(England)	King's Lynn	9.74
11	Ove Fundin	(Sweden)	Belle Vue	9.65
12	Arne Pander	(Denmark)	Oxford	9.57
13	Ken McKinlay	(Scotland)	West Ham	9.53
14	Olle Nygren	(Sweden)	Wimbledon	9.52
15	Roy Trigg	(England)	Oxford	9.37
16	Ivan Mauger	(New Zealand)	Newcastle	9.32
17	Hasse Holmqvist	(Sweden)	Wolverhampton	9.29
18	Bernt Persson	(Sweden)	Edinburgh	9.19
19	Dave Younghusband	(England)	Halifax	9.12
20	Jim Airey	(Australia)	Wolverhampton	9.08

== London Cup ==
West Ham won the three team London Cup for the third consecutive year.

Pos	Team	P	W	D	L	F	A	Pts
1	West Ham Hammers	4	4	0	0	230	154	8
2	Wimbledon Dons	4	1	0	3	181	202	2
3	Hackney Hawks	4	1	0	3	164	219	2

Home \ Away	HAC	WH	WIM
Hackney		42–54	50–46
West Ham	57–39		60–36
Wimbledon	62–33	37–59	

Legend: Blue = home team win; Yellow = draw; Red = away team win.

== Midland Cup ==
Swindon won the Midland Cup, which consisted of six teams.

First round

Team one	Team two	Score
Long Eaton	Oxford	40–37, 35–43
Cradley	Wolverhampton	40–38, 29–49

Semi final round

Team one	Team two	Score
Swindon	Oxford	48–30, 40–38
Wolverhampton	Coventry	38–40, 29–49

Final

First leg

27 September 1967

Swindon Barry Briggs 12 Mike Broadbank 12 Martin Ashby 11 Mike Keen 5 Bob Kilby 5 Frank Shuter 3 Pete Munday 3	51–27	Coventry Nigel Boocock 11 Rick France 5 Les Owen 5 Ron Mountford 4 Col Cottrell 1 Roger Hill 1 Clive Hitch 0

Abbey Stadium

Second leg

4 October 1967

Coventry Nigel Boocock 11 Les Owen 9 Rick France 8 Col Cottrell 7 Roger Hill 6 Tom Ridley 0 Clive Hitch 0	41–37	Swindon Barry Briggs 14 Martin Ashby 8 Mike Broadbank 6 Bob Kilby 4 Pete Munday 2 Mike Keen 2 Frank Shuter 1

Brandon Stadium

Swindon won on aggregate 88–68

== Riders & final averages ==
Belle Vue

- (Sweden) Ove Fundin 9.65
- (Sweden) Sören Sjösten 9.03
- (England) Cyril Maidment 8.32
- (England) Tommy Roper 7.83
- (England) Norman Nevitt 6.42
- (Hungary) Sándor Lévai 5.89
- (England) Eric Broadbelt 3.56
- (England) Jim Yacoby 3.31
- (New Zealand) Paul O'Neal 2.75
- (Australia) John Woodcock 2.72
- (Australia) Garry Middleton 2.60
- (England) Dave Hardy 2.55

Coventry

- (England) Nigel Boocock 10.52
- (England) Rick France 8.97
- (England) Ron Mountford 8.66
- (England) Col Cottrell 6.33
- (England) Les Owen 6.25
- (England) Clive Hitch 4.89
- (England) Roger Hill 4.08
- (England) Chris Harrison 3.23

Cradley

- (England) Ivor Brown 7.54
- (England) Brian Brett 7.34
- (Sweden) Tommy Bergqvist 7.32
- (England) Chris Julian 7.04
- (Australia) Jack Scott 6.37
- (New Zealand) Graham Coombes 6.04
- (Australia) Jack Biggs 5.67
- (England) Alan Totney 3.76
- (England) Ken Wakefield 3.39
- (England) Peter Wrathall 3.16
- (England) Dave Schofield 2.60

Edinburgh

- (Sweden) Bernt Persson 9.19
- (Norway) Reidar Eide 8.99
- (Scotland) George Hunter 8.13
- (Norway) Oyvind Berg 6.50
- (Scotland) Doug Templeton 6.46
- (Scotland) Bill Landels 5.84
- (Scotland) Bert Harkins 5.31
- (Scotland) Brian Black 5.14
- (Scotland) Brian Collins 3.56

Exeter

- (Sweden) Gunnar Malmqvist 8.21
- (New Zealand) Wayne Briggs 7.83
- (England) Jimmy Squibb 7.38
- (Australia) Neil Street 7.25
- (England) Colin Gooddy 6.78
- (Australia) Jack Geran 6.66
- (Sweden) Per Gerhardsson 6.57
- (England) Tommy Sweetman 6.42
- (Canada) Chris Blewett 5.55
- (England) Mike Cake 3.90
- (England) Tim Bungay 3.28

Glasgow

- (Australia) Charlie Monk 10.50
- (Sweden) Bo Josefsson 6.90
- (New Zealand) Alf Wells 6.47
- (England) Maury Mattingley 6.41
- (Scotland) Willie Templeton 6.36
- (England) Russ Dent 5.98
- (Norway) Jonny Faafeng 5.40
- (Scotland) Jimmy McMillan 4.68
- (Scotland) Bill McMillan 4.00
- (Sweden) Nils Ringstrom 3.80
- (Australia) Brian Whaley 3.07

Hackney

- (Sweden) Bengt Jansson 9.87
- (England) Colin Pratt 8.95
- (New Zealand) Colin McKee 6.25
- (England) Les McGillivray 5.82
- (England) Gerry Jackson 5.33
- (England) Malcolm Brown 5.05
- (England) Gary Everett 4.97
- (England) Brian Davies 4.66

Halifax

- (England) Eric Boocock 10.29
- (England) Dave Younghusband 9.12
- (England) Eric Boothroyd 8.42
- (Australia) Dennis Gavros 6.00
- (Australia) Bert Kingston 4.78
- (Australia) Greg Kentwell 4.76
- (England) Maury Robinson 4.34
- (Australia) Bob Jameson 4.14
- (Australia) Les Bentzen 2.75

King's Lynn

- (England) Terry Betts 9.74
- (England) David Crane 7.95
- (England) Clive Featherby 6.27
- (Australia) Peter Moore 6.05
- (Wales) Howard Cole (Kid Bodie) 5.72
- (Poland) Ted Laessing 4.39
- (England) Stan Stevens 4.00
- (England) John Mills 3.39
- (England) John Poyser 2.73
- (Australia) Doug White 2.73

Long Eaton

- (England) Ray Wilson 10.43
- (Sweden) Anders Michanek 8.74
- (England) Jim Lightfoot 7.10
- (Australia) John Boulger 5.77
- (England) Norman Storer 4.82
- (England) Vic White 3.97
- (England) John Poyser 2.92
- (England) Ian Champion 2.72

Newcastle

- (New Zealand) Ivan Mauger 9.32
- (Denmark) Ole Olsen 7.54
- (England) Mike Watkin 6.10
- (England) Alan Butterfield 6.04
- (England) Russ Dent 6.00
- (England) Peter Kelly 5.98
- (New Zealand) Goog Allan 5.93
- (New Zealand) Dave Gifford 5.63
- (Australia) Alan Paynter 1.65

Newport

- (Sweden) Torbjorn Harrysson 10.05
- (England) Jimmy Gooch 8.27
- (England) Jon Erskine 6.63
- (England) Alby Golden 6.29
- (Wales) Cyril Francis 6.08
- (Wales) Bob Hughes 4.76
- (England) John Bishop 4.24

Oxford

- (Denmark) Arne Pander 9.57
- (England) Roy Trigg 9.37
- (England) Colin Gooddy 8.29
- (England) Eddie Reeves 7.51
- (England) Des Lukehurst 6.06
- (Wales) Leo McAuliffe 4.95
- (New Zealand) Rick Timmo 4.68
- (England) Maury McDermott 4.00
- (England) Peter Seaton 2.40

Poole

- (Sweden) Göte Nordin 9.99
- (Australia) Geoff Mudge 8.25
- (England) Ronnie Genz 8.00
- (England) Tony Lewis 8.00
- (England) Pete Smith 6.29
- (England) Norman Strachan 5.91
- (New Zealand) Bruce Cribb 4.94
- (England) Geoff Penniket 4.68

Sheffield

- (Sweden) Bengt Larsson 7.08
- (England) Arnold Haley 7.04
- (England) John Hart 6.97
- (England) Bob Paulson 6.65
- (England) Alan Jay 6.22
- (England) John Dews 6.02
- (England) Billy Bales 5.82
- (England) George Major 5.45
- (England) Eric Hockaday 3.78

Swindon

- (New Zealand) Barry Briggs 11.05
- (England) Martin Ashby 8.83
- (England) Bob Kilby 8.61
- (England) Mike Broadbank 8.55
- (New Zealand) Frank Shuter 4.46
- (England) Mike Keen 4.41
- (England) Pete Munday 4.25

West Ham

- (Norway) Sverre Harrfeldt 10.25
- (Scotland) Ken McKinlay 9.53
- (England) Norman Hunter 7.54
- (England) Malcolm Simmons 7.09
- (England) Brian Leonard 7.03
- (England) George Barclay 4.76
- (England) Stan Stevens 4.46
- (England) Tony Clarke 4.36
- (England) Dai Evans 0.80

Wimbledon

- (Sweden) Olle Nygren 9.52
- (England) Trevor Hedge 8.49
- (England) Reg Luckhurst 8.23
- (England) Bob Dugard 6.00
- (England) Jim TebbyJ 5.86
- (England) Alan Cowland 5.23
- (Australia) Garry Middleton 4.56
- (Sweden) Leif Soderberg 3.19
- (New Zealand) Murray Burt 2.06

Wolverhampton

- (Sweden) Hasse Holmqvist 9.29
- (Australia) Jim Airey 9.08
- (Netherlands) Peter Vandenberg 8.21
- (England) Pete Jarman 7.92
- (England) James Bond 5.56
- (England) Dave Hemus 5.04
- (England) Brian Maxted 4.72
- (England) Mick Handley 1.95

== See also ==
- List of United Kingdom Speedway League Champions
- Knockout Cup (speedway)
