= 1969 Individual Speedway World Championship =

Motorcycle speedway world championship season

Seasons
- ← 1968 1970 →

The 1969 Individual Speedway World Championship was the 24th edition of the official World Championship to determine the world champion rider.

The final was sponsored by the Sunday Mirror and held at Wembley. Ivan Mauger retained his title and won £1,000 in prize money. Barry Briggs finished second again after beating Sören Sjösten in a run-off for silver.

== Format changes ==
The format of the Championship changed again for the 1969 event. This time the Swedish riders were pooled with the Continental and European sections that would provide 10 riders for the World Final, while the British and Commonwealth riders would supply 6 riders for the World Final to be held at Wembley Stadium in London.

== First round ==
Qualification results.

=== Norwegian qualifying ===
- 13 October 1968
- (Norway) Kongsberg Idrettsparken, Kongsberg
- Top 4 (+2 seeded) to Nordic qualification 1969

Pos.	Rider	Points
1	Reidar Eide	15
2	Oyvind S. Berg	14
3	Per Aulie	13
4	Ulf Lovaas	10
5	Einar Egedius	9
6	Odd Fossengen	9
7	Helge Langli	9
8	Jan Terje Gravningen	8
9	Thorbjorn Nygaard	8
10	Svein Kaasa	6
11	Edgar Stangeland	6
12	Sverre Holm	3
13	Kjell P. Skaeveland	3
14	Per H. Hansen	2
15	Kare Heia	2
16	Thorbjorn Olsen	2

=== Finnish qualifying (top 8) ===
- (2 rounds) 2 Aug & 21 Sep 1968
- (Finland) Eteläpuisto, Tampere & Kärpänen Speedway, Lahti
- Top 3 (+seeded riders) to Nordic qualification 1969

Pos.	Rider	Points	Total
1	Matti Olin	8+8	16
2	Reima Lohkovuori	6+4	10
3	Jouko Naskali	0+6	6
4	Esko Koponen	4+2	6
5	Jorma Taipale	3+0	3
6	Kauko Reima	0+3	3
7	Juhani Lappi	2+1	3
8	Olavi Tutunen	1+0	1

=== Swedish qualification ===
- Top 8 in each heat to Nordic qualification

25 April, Ullevi, Gothenburg
Pos	Rider	Points
1	Ove Fundin	15
2	Bengt Brannefors	14
3	Bengt Larsson	13
4	Bo Josefsson	12
5	Conny Samuelsson	10
6	Hans Hallberg	10
7	Benny Lundström	9
8	Sune Stark	7
9	Nils Ringström	7
10	Börje Melin	6
11	Inge Gustafsson	6
12	Willy Friberg	5
13	Ryno Westergren	3
14	Olle Åhnström	2
15	Reine Södergren	1
16	Sören Backlund	0

27 April, Vetlanda Motorstadion
Pos	Rider	Points
1	Bengt Jansson	15
2	Gunnar Malmqvist	14
3	Bengt Svensson	12
4	Sven-Inge Svensson	11
5	Runo Wedin	11
6	Tommy Johansson	9
7	Bo Magnusson	8
8	Jan Simensen	9
9	Åke Andersson	6
10	Sonny Widergren	6
11	Birger Aniander	5
12	Sixten Carlberg	4
13	Jan Strid	4
14	Lennart Michanek	3
15	Arne Hansson	3
16	Lars Jennefors	1

28 April, Ryavallen, Borås
Pos	Rider	Points
1	Bernt Persson	14
2	Göte Nordin	13
3	Per-Olof Söderman	13
4	Sören Sjösten	10
5	Håkan Karlsson	9
6	Olle Nygren	8
7	Börje Olsson	8
8	Bengt Andersson	8
9	Sigvard Johansson	8
10	Per Sjöholm	7
11	Allan Dahlöf	7
12	Stig Pettersson	4
13	Hans Johansson	4
14	Yngve Nilsson	3
15	Käll Haage	3
16	Lennart Karlsson	1

29 April, Avestavallen, Avesta
Pos	Rider	Points
1	Leif Enecrona	12
2	Hasse Holmqvist	11
3	Anders Michanek	11
4	Leif Larsson	8
5	Sven Sigurd	8
6	Christer Löfqvist	8
7	Per-Åke Gerhardsson	6
8	Therje Henriksson	6
9	Tommy Bergqvist	5
10	Lars Jansson	5
11	Egon Stengarn	4
12	Rolf Karlsson	3
13	Lars Eriksson	2
14	Hans Utterström	2
15	Curt Nyqvist	1
16	Jan Holmqvist	0

=== Continental qualifying ===
- Top 32 to Continental semi-finals

Date	Venue	Winner	2nd	3rd
11 May	(West Germany) Speedway Stadion, Ruhpolding	(Poland) Antoni Woryna	(Poland) Edward Jancarz	(West Germany) Manfred Poschenreider
11 May	(Socialist Federal Republic of Yugoslavia) Matija Gubec Stadium, Krško	(Poland) Jerzy Trzeszkowski	(Poland) Zdislaw Dobrucki	(Soviet Union) Gennady Kurilenko
11 May	(Hungary) Borsod Volán Stadion, Miskolc	(Soviet Union) Vladimir Smirnov	(Poland) Zbigniew Podlecki	(Poland) Paweł Waloszek
11 May	(East Germany) Paul Greifzu Stadium, Stralsund	(Soviet Union) Viktor Trofimov	(Poland) Zygmunt Pytko	(East Germany) Jürgen Hehlert

=== British/Commonwealth qualifying ===
- Top 32 to British/Commonwealth semi-finals

Date	Venue	Winner	2nd	3rd
17 May	The Shay, Halifax	Eric Boocock	Charlie Monk	Reg Luckhurst
17 May	Cliftonhill, Coatbridge	Jim McMillan	Bert Harkins	Trevor Hedge
19 May	Brough Park, Newcastle	Eric Boocock	Ray Wilson	Dave Gifford
19 May	County Ground Stadium, Exeter	Barry Briggs	Martin Ashby	Tony Clarke
20 May	Leicester Stadium, Leicester	Martin Ashby	Howard Cole	John Boulger
20 May	West Ham Stadium, London	Norman Hunter	Stan Stevens	Ken McKinlay
21 May	Wimborne Road, Poole	Geoff Mudge	Ivan Mauger	Pete Smith
22 May	Oxford Stadium, Oxford	Eddie Reeves	Pete Smith	Mike Broadbanks
22 May	Wimbledon, London	Ronny Moore	Tony Clarke	Ivan Mauger
22 May	Owlerton Stadium, Sheffield	Arnold Haley	Jim Airey	Nigel Boocock
23 May	Somerton Park, Newport	Sándor Lévai	Frank Shuter	Reg Luckhurst
23 May	Hampden Park, Glasgow	Charlie Monk	Barry Briggs	Jim McMillan
23 May	Hackney Wick Stadium, London	Colin Pratt	Garry Middleton	Pete Smith
23 May	Monmore Green, Wolverhampton	Nigel Boocock	James Bond	Norman Hunter
24 May	Hyde Road, Manchester	Ivan Mauger	Ray Wilson	Chris Pusey
24 May	Brandon Stadium, Coventry	Nigel Boocock	Norman Hunter	Coll Cottrell
1 June	King's Lynn Stadium, King's Lynn	Terry Betts	Malcolm Simmons	Martin Ashby
9 June	Dudley Wood Stadium, Dudley	Roy Trigg	Bob Andrews	James Bond
11 June	Abbey Stadium, Swindon	Barry Briggs	Jim Airey	Clive Hitch

== Second round ==
=== Nordic qualification ===
1 May, (Sweden) Gamla Speedway Track Visby
Pos	Rider	Points
1	Sören Sjösten	13
2	Bernt Persson	13
3	Hasse Holmqvist	13
4	Bengt Larsson	12
5	Gunnar Malmqvist	12
6	Runo Wedin	10
7	Öyvind S. Berg	10
8	Therje Henriksson	8
9	Christer Löfqvist	8
10	Börje Olsson	5
11	Conny Samuelsson	4
12	Bent Nörregaard-Jensen	4
13	Torbjörn Karlsson	4
14	Svein Kaasa	2
15	Jan Höijvind	1
16	Reima Lohkovuori	0

1 May, (Sweden) Kumla Motorstadion Kumla
Pos	Rider	Points
1	Bengt Jansson	13
2	Per-Olof Söderman	13
3	Jan Simensen	13
4	Nils Ringström	12
5	Reidar Eide	11
6	Anders Michanek	11
7	Bengt Andersson	8
8	Sven Sigurd	8
9	Kurt Bögh	7
10	Hans Hallberg	6
11	Ulf Lövaas	5
12	Sven-Inge Svensson	4
13	Bengt Brannefors	3
14	Esko Koponen	2
15	Godtfred Andreasen	2
16	Helge Langli	1

1 May, (Sweden) Gislaved Motorbana Gislaved
Pos	Rider	Points
1	Ove Fundin	15
2	Göte Nordin	14
3	Ole Olsen	13
4	Bo Josefsson	12
5	Odd Fossengen	11
6	Bengt Svensson	10
7	Benny Lundström	8
8	Tommy Johansson	8
9	Sigvard Johansson	6
10	Sune Stark	6
11	Per-Åke Gerhardsson	4
12	Jens Ring	4
13	Matti Olin	3
14	Per Aulie	2
15	Håkan Karlsson	1
16	Leif Enecrona	0

=== Continental semi-finals ===
- 7 June
- (Czechoslovakia) Slaný Speedway Stadium, Slaný
- Top 8 to Continental final

Pos.	Rider	Points
1	(Poland) Antoni Woryna	13
2	(Poland) Zbigniew Podlecki	11
3	(Poland) Andrzej Wyglenda	11
4	(Poland) Jan Mucha	10
5	(Poland) Edward Jancarz	10
6	(Poland) Stanislaw Tkocz	9
7	(Poland) Pawel Waloszek	9
8	(Czechoslovakia) Jan Holub I	9
9	(West Germany) Manfred Poschenreider	8
10	(Soviet Union) Vladimir Smirnov	7
11	(Czechoslovakia) Miloslav Verner	7
12	(Czechoslovakia) František Ledecký	7
13	(East Germany) Hans Jürgen Fritz	3
14	(Hungary) Janos Szöke	3
15	(Soviet Union) Vjatjeslav Baturin	2
16	(Czechoslovakia) Antonín Kasper Sr.	1

- 8 June
- (Poland) Polonia Bydgoszcz Stadium, Bydgoszcz
- Top 8 to Continental final

Pos.	Rider	Points
1	(Poland) Jerzy Trzeszkowski	14
2	(Poland) Henryk Glucklich	13
3	(Poland) Andrzej Pogorzelski	11
4	(Soviet Union) Valerij Klementiev	11
5	(Soviet Union) Gennadij Kurilenko	9
6	(Poland) Zygmunt Pytko	9
7	(Poland) Zbigniew Dobrucki	9
8	(Czechoslovakia) Karel Průša	9
9	(East Germany) Gerhard Uhlenbrock	7
10	(Czechoslovakia) Václav Verner	6
11	(Soviet Union) Boris Tschechanvitsch	6
12	(Czechoslovakia) Jaroslav Volf	5
13	(Soviet Union) Viktor Trofimov	5
14	(Czechoslovakia) Jiří Štancl	4
15	(East Germany) Peter Liebing	2
16	(Socialist Federal Republic of Yugoslavia) Drago Perko	0

=== British semi-finals ===
- 24 June
- (England) Leicester Stadium, Leicester
- Top 8 to British final

Pos.	Rider	Points
1	(New Zealand) Barry Briggs	14
2	(Australia) Charlie Monk	11
3	(England) Reg Luckhurst	11
4	(Scotland) Jim McMillan	10
5	(England) Trevor Hedge	10
6	(Australia) Garry Middleton	9
7	(Wales) Howard Cole	8
8	(England) Norman Hunter	8
9	(New Zealand) Ronnie Moore	7
10	(England) Arnie Haley	7
11	(England) James Bond	7
12	(England) Clive Hitch	6
13	(England) Cyril Maidment	5
14	(Australia) Jim Airey	4
15	(Scotland) Bert Harkins	2
16	(England) Colin Gooddy	1

- 26 June
- (England) Owlerton Stadium, Sheffield
- Top 8 to British final

Pos.	Rider	Points
1	(New Zealand) Ivan Mauger	14
2	(England) Ray Wilson	14
3	(England) Tommy Roper	12
4	(England) Nigel Boocock	11
5	(England) Roy Trigg	11
6	(England) Eric Boocock	11
7	(Scotland) Ken McKinlay	7
8	(England) Colin Pratt	7
9	(England) Martin Ashby	6
10	(Australia) Geoff Mudge	6
11	(New Zealand) Bruce Cribb	6
12	(England) Terry Betts	5
13	(England) Tony Clarke	5
14	(England) Pete Smith	3
15	(Australia) John Boulger	1
16	(England) Bob Andrews	1

== Third round ==
=== Nordic Final ===
- 4 June 1969
- (Sweden) Linköping Motorstadion Ryd, Linköping
- First 8 to European Final

Placing	Rider	Total	1	2	3	4	5	6	7	8	9	10	11	12	13	14	15	16	17	18	19	20	Pts	Pos	21
1	(Sweden) (1) Torbjörn Harrysson	14	3				3				3				2				3				14	1	3
2	(Sweden) (3) Sören Sjösten	14	2						3				3				3				3		14	2	2
3	(Sweden) (12) Ove Fundin	14			3					3		3			3						2		14	3	1
4	(Norway) (14) Reidar Eide	12				3		3					2		1							3	12	4	
5	(Sweden) (6) Bernt Persson	10		3				2			2							2			1		10	5	
6	(Sweden) (2) Hasse Holmqvist	10	1					1				2				3				3			10	6	
7	(Sweden) (4) Bengt Jansson	9	0							2				3				3				1	9	7	
8	(Sweden) (11) Per Olof Söderman	9			2				2		1					2						2	9	8	
9	(Sweden) (8) Bo Josefsson	6		2						1			1			0			2				6	9	3
10	(Sweden) (13) Gunnar Malmqvist	6				1	2							2		1					0		6	10	2
11	(Sweden) (10) Bengt Larsson	5			1			0						1			2		1				5	11	
12	(Sweden) (7) Jan Simensen	2		0					1					0	0					1			2	12	
13	(Denmark) (16) Ole Olsen	2				2				0	-						0			-			2	13	
14	(Norway) (5) Odd Fossengen	2		0			0					1					1					0	2	14	
15	(Sweden) (9) Göte Nordin	1			0		1						0					-		-			1	15	
16	(Sweden) (15) Nils Ringstrom	0				0			0			0						0	0				0	16	
R1	(Sweden) (R1) Runo Wedin	3																1		2			3	R1	
R2	(Sweden) (R2) Bengt Svensson	0									0									0			0	R2	
Placing	Rider	Total	1	2	3	4	5	6	7	8	9	10	11	12	13	14	15	16	17	18	19	20	Pts	Pos	21

m - exclusion for exceeding two minute time allowance • t - exclusion for touching the tapes • x - other exclusion • e - retired or mechanical failure • f - fell • ns - non-starter • nc - non-classify

gate A - inside	gate B	gate C	gate D - outside

=== Continental Final ===
- 27 June 1969
- (Soviet Union) Stroitel Stadion, Ufa
- First 8 to European Final plus 1 reserve

Placing	Rider	Total	1	2	3	4	5	6	7	8	9	10	11	12	13	14	15	16	17	18	19	20	Pts	Pos	21
1	(Poland) (7) Antoni Woryna	11		2					3					1	2					3			11	1	
2	(Poland) (16) Andrzej Wyglenda	10				0				3	3						2			2			10	2	
3	(Poland) (2) Edward Jancarz	10	3					2				3				2				0			10	3	
4	(Soviet Union) (14) Valeri Klementiev	9				3		E					0		3							3	9	4	
5	(Poland) (1) Henryk Glucklich	9	0				3				2				1				3				9	5	
6	(Poland) (9) Zbigniew Podlecki	9			3		2						3					0		1			9	6	
7	(Poland) (6) Jan Mucha	9		1				3			1							1			3		9	7	
8	(Poland) (13) Andrzej Pogorzelski	9				2	0							2		3					2		9	8	
9	(Soviet Union) (8) Gennady Kurilenko	9		3						2			2			1			1				9	9	
10	(Poland) (4) Jerzy Trzeszkowski	9	2							1				3				2				1	9	10	
11	(Poland) (5) Stanisław Tkocz	8		E			1					2					3					2	8	11	
12	(Czechoslovakia) (15) Jan Holub I	8				1			1			1						3	2				8	12	
13	(Poland) (3) Paweł Waloszek	6	1						2				1				1				1		6	13	
14	(Poland) (10) Zygmunt Pytko	3			2			1						E			0		E				3	14	
15	(Poland) (12) Zdislaw Dobrucki	0			F					0		E			E						E		0	15	
16	(Czechoslovakia) (11) Karel Prusa	0			E				0		E					-						-	0	16	
R1	(East Germany) (R1) Gerhard Ulenbrock	0														0						0	0	R1	
Placing	Rider	Total	1	2	3	4	5	6	7	8	9	10	11	12	13	14	15	16	17	18	19	20	Pts	Pos	21

m - exclusion for exceeding two minute time allowance • t - exclusion for touching the tapes • x - other exclusion • e - retired or mechanical failure • f - fell • ns - non-starter • nc - non-classify

gate A - inside	gate B	gate C	gate D - outside

== Fourth round ==
=== British/Commonwealth Final ===
- 5 August 1969
- (England) West Ham Stadium, London
- First 6 to World Final plus 1 reserve

Placing	Rider	Total	1	2	3	4	5	6	7	8	9	10	11	12	13	14	15	16	17	18	19	20	Pts	Pos	21
1	(New Zealand) (9) Barry Briggs	15			3		3						3					3		3			15	1	
2	(England) (3) Nigel Boocock	13	3						3				2				3				2		13	2	3
3	(New Zealand) (6) Ronnie Moore	13		3				2			3							2			3		13	3	2
4	(New Zealand) (2) Ivan Mauger	11	0					3				3				3				2			11	4	
5	(Scotland) (4) Ken McKinlay	11	2							3				2				1				3	11	5	
6	(Wales) (11) Howard Cole	9			2				1		2					2						2	9	6	
7	(England) (16) Arnold Haley	8				3				2	1						2			X			8	7	3
8	(England) (7) Eric Boocock	8		1					2					1	3					1			8	8	2
9	(Australia) (13) Garry Middleton	8				2	2							3		1					T		8	9	1
10	(Australia) (10) Charlie Monk	6			1			1						0			1		3				6	10	
11	(England) (8) Martin Ashby	4		0						1			1			X			2				4	11	
12	(England) (5) Trevor Hedge	4		2			1					1					0					0	4	12	
13	(Scotland) (14) Jim McMillan	4				1		0					0		2							1	4	13	
14	(England) (15) Colin Pratt	3				E			T			2						0	1				3	14	
15	(England) (1) Ray Wilson	3	1				F				1				1				0				3	15	
16	(England) (12) Roy Trigg	1			0					E		0			0						1		1	16	
R1	(England) (R1) James Bond	0							0														0	R1	
R2	(England) (R2) Clive Hitch	0																					0	R2	
R3	(England) (R3) Martin Ashby	0																					0	R3	
Placing	Rider	Total	1	2	3	4	5	6	7	8	9	10	11	12	13	14	15	16	17	18	19	20	Pts	Pos	21

m - exclusion for exceeding two minute time allowance • t - exclusion for touching the tapes • x - other exclusion • e - retired or mechanical failure • f - fell • ns - non-starter • nc - non-classify

gate A - inside	gate B	gate C	gate D - outside

=== European Final ===
- 24 August 1969
- (West Germany) Olching Speedwaybahn, Olching
- First 10 to World Final plus 1 reserve

Placing	Rider	Total	1	2	3	4	5	6	7	8	9	10	11	12	13	14	15	16	17	18	19	20	Pts	Pos	21
1	(Soviet Union) (13) Valeri Klementiev	12				0	3							3		3					3		12	1	
2	(Poland) (15) Edward Jancarz	12				2			3			3						2	2				12	2	
3	(Sweden) (2) Torbjörn Harrysson	11	3					3				2				2				1			11	3	
4	(Poland) (4) Andrzej Pogorzelski	11	1							3				2				3				2	11	4	
5	(Poland) (5) Andrzej Wyglenda	9		3			1					1					1					3	9	5	
6	(Sweden) (3) Sören Sjösten	9	2						0				3				2				2		9	6	
7	(Poland) (16) Henryk Glucklich	8				1				0	1						3			3			8	7	
8	(Sweden) (6) Hasse Holmqvist	8		2				2			3							1			0		8	8	
9	(Sweden) (7) Ove Fundin	8		1					1					1	3					2			8	9	
10	(Poland) (8) Jan Mucha	8		0						2			2			1			3				8	10	
11	(Poland) (14) Zbigniew Podlecki	7				3		1					1		1							1	7	11	
12	(Sweden) (11) Bengt Jansson	5			3				2		0					0						0	5	12	
13	(Poland) (1) Antoni Woryna	5	0				2				2				0				1				5	13	
14	(Sweden) (12) Bernt Persson	5			1					1		0			2						1		5	14	
15	(Norway) (10) Reidar Eide	2			2			0						0			0		0				2	15	
16	(Sweden) (9) Per Olof Söderman	0			0		0						0					0		0			0	16	
Placing	Rider	Total	1	2	3	4	5	6	7	8	9	10	11	12	13	14	15	16	17	18	19	20	Pts	Pos	21

m - exclusion for exceeding two minute time allowance • t - exclusion for touching the tapes • x - other exclusion • e - retired or mechanical failure • f - fell • ns - non-starter • nc - non-classify

gate A - inside	gate B	gate C	gate D - outside

== World Final ==
- 13 September 1969
- (England) Wembley Stadium, London

Placing	Rider	Total	1	2	3	4	5	6	7	8	9	10	11	12	13	14	15	16	17	18	19	20	Pts	Pos	21
1	(New Zealand) (11) Ivan Mauger	14			3				3		3					3						2	14	1	
2	(New Zealand) (16) Barry Briggs	11				3				2	2						1			3			11	2	3
3	(Sweden) (5) Sören Sjösten	11		3			F					2					3					3	11	3	2
4	(England) (2) Nigel Boocock	10	3					2				3				1				1			10	4	
5	(Sweden) (9) Hasse Holmqvist	10			2		1						3					2		2			10	5	
6	(Poland) (6) Edward Jancarz	9		1				1			1							3			3		9	6	
7	(Sweden) (7) Ove Fundin	9		2					2					2	3					0			9	7	
8	(Scotland) (13) Ken McKinlay	7				1	3							3		0					0		7	8	
9	(Poland) (14) Andrzej Pogorzelski	7				0		3					1		2							1	7	9	
10	(Poland) (3) Jan Mucha	7	1						0				2				2				2		7	10	
11	(New Zealand) (15) Ronnie Moore	6				2			1			1						1	1				6	11	
12	(Poland) (8) Henryk Glücklich	5		0						0			0			2			3				5	12	
13	(Soviet Union) (12) Valeri Klementiev	4			0					3		X			F						1		4	13	
14	(Sweden) (1) Torbjörn Harrysson	4	2				2				F				-				-				4	14	
15	(Poland) (4) Andrzej Wyglenda	2	0							1				1				0				0	2	15	
16	(Wales) (10) Howard Cole	1			1			0						0			0		0				1	16	
R1	(Poland) (R1) Zbigniew Podlecki	3													1				2				3	R1	
R2	(England) (R2) Arnold Haley	0																					0	R2	
Placing	Rider	Total	1	2	3	4	5	6	7	8	9	10	11	12	13	14	15	16	17	18	19	20	Pts	Pos	21

m - exclusion for exceeding two minute time allowance • t - exclusion for touching the tapes • x - other exclusion • e - retired or mechanical failure • f - fell • ns - non-starter • nc - non-classify

gate A - inside	gate B	gate C	gate D - outside
