= 1967 Individual Speedway World Championship =

Motorcycle speedway world championship season

Seasons
- ← 1966 1968 →

The 1967 Individual Speedway World Championship was the 22nd edition of the official World Championship to determine the world champion rider.

At Wembley in front of a 70,000 crowd Ove Fundin won a record fifth title, one year after Barry Briggs had equalled his record in 1966. Fellow Swede Bengt Jansson took silver and New Zealander Ivan Mauger took bronze, improving on his fourth-place position the previous year.

== Format changes ==
The format of the Championship changed for the 1967 event. It reverted to the 1965 system whereby riders from the European Final and British/Commonwealth Final would qualify for the World Final to be held at Wembley Stadium in London. However the European Final would now see 10 riders qualifying for the final.

== First round ==
Qualification results.

=== Norwegian qualifying ===
- 23 October 1966
- (Norway) Krohnsminde, Bergen
- Top 6 to Nordic qualification 1967

Pos.	Rider	Points
1	Sverre Harrfeldt	15
2	Reidar Eide	13
3	Per J. Aulie	12
4	Aage Hansen	11
5	Oyvind S. Berg	11
6	Johnny Faafeng	9
7	Knut Syrrist	9
8	Svein Svendsrud	8
9	Sven Tollefsen	7
10	Arne N. Larsen	4
11	Jan Terje Gravningen	4
12	Hans R. Gaarder	4
13	Ole Todnem	3
14	Tore Christensen	2
15	Kjell Gimre	0
16	Helge Langli	0

=== Finnish qualifying ===
- (2 rounds) 25 August & 30 June 1966
- (Finland) Kärpänen Speedway, Lahti & Eteläpuisto, Tampere
- Top 3 (+seeded riders) to Nordic qualification 1967

Pos.	Rider	Points	Total
1	Olavi Turunen	15+10	10+
2	Matti Olin	13+11	10+
3	Kalevi Lahtinen	9+15	9+
4	Esko Koponen	6+13	6 +
5	Heikki Kaprali	12+9	4+
6	Jouko Naskali	11+10	4+
7	Timo Laine	7+11	3+
8	Jorma Taipale	10+3	2+
9	Timo Sinkkonen	8+6	0
10	Reima Kohkovuori	5+8	0
11	Reijo Tolviander	4+7	0
12	Matti Myllyntausta	7+0	0
13	Keijo Reima	-+7	0
14	Esko Mantila	4+0	0
15	Kauko Reima	-+4	0
16	Matti Sylväsalo	-+2	0
17	Pekka Peltonen	1+0	0
18	Matti Ackmann	0+1	0

+Points awarded for top six only (8, 6, 4, 3, 2, 1)

=== Swedish Qualifying ===
- 23 April, Gamla Motorstadion, Målilla
- Top 8 to Nordic qualification

Pos.	Rider	Points
1	Ove Fundin	15
2	Olle Nygren	14
3	Per-Olof Söderman	11
4	Gunnar Malmqvist	10
5	Bo Josefsson	10
6	Conny Samuelsson	9
7	Sven Sigurd	9
8	Sune Stark	8
9	Karl-Erik Andersson	8
10	Sören Sjösten	8
11	Bengt Brannefors	8
12	Åke Andersson	3
13	Bo Magnusson	3
14	Therje Henriksson	2
15	Jan Simensen	2
16	Willy Friberg	0

- 1 May, Gamla Speedway Track, Visby
- Top 8 to Nordic qualification

Pos.	Rider	Points
1	Bernt Persson	13
2	Göte Nordin	12
3	Hasse Holmqvist	11
4	Anders Michanek	11
5	Bengt Jansson	10
6	Lars Jansson	10
7	Bengt Larsson	9
8	Leif Enecrona	9
9	Bengt Svensson	7
10	Torbjörn Harrysson	6
11	Runo Wedin	6
12	Jan Svensson	5
13	Egon Stengarn	4
14	Yngve Nilsson	4
15	Sune Ohlsson	2
16	Per-Åke Gerhardsson	1
17	Nils Ringström	0

=== Continental qualifying ===
- Top 32 to continental semi-finals

Date	Venue	Winner	2nd	3rd
7 May	(East Germany) Meissen Speedway Stadium, Meissen	(East Germany) Jürgen Hehlert	(Czechoslovakia) Antonín Kasper Sr.	(Poland) Zbigniew Podlecki
7 May	(Hungary) Borsod Volán Stadion, Miskolc	(Poland) Edmund Migoś	(Czechoslovakia) Jan Holub I	(Poland) Andrzej Pogorzelski
7 May	(West Germany) Abensberger Stadion, Abensberg	(Poland) Joachim Maj	(Poland) Pawel Waloszek	(Soviet Union) Gabdrakhman Kadyrov
7 May	(Socialist Federal Republic of Yugoslavia) Kovinar Stadium, Maribor	(Poland) Andrzej Wyglenda	(Poland) Jerzy Trzeszkowski	(Soviet Union) Sergej Lyatosinsky

== Second round ==
=== British qualifying ===
- Top 32 to British semi-finals

Date	Venue	Winner	2nd	3rd
12 May	Somerton Park, Newport	Eric Boocock	Roy Trigg	Ray Wilson
12 May	Hackney Wick Stadium, London	Ivan Mauger	Colin Pratt	Malcolm Brown
12 May	King's Lynn Stadium, King's Lynn	Terry Betts	Reg Luckhurst	Dave Younghusband
13 May	Old Meadowbank, Edinburgh	George Hunter	Ray Wilson	Bert Harkins
13 May	Abbey Stadium, Swindon	Charlie Monk	Martin Ashby	Geoff Mudge
13 May	Dudley Wood Stadium, Dudley	Ivor Brown	Chris Julian	Norman Hunter
15 May	County Ground Stadium, Exeter	Nigel Boocock	Eric Boocock	Martin Ashby
16 May	West Ham Stadium, London	Rick France	Reg Luckhurst	Ken McKinlay
17 May	Wimborne Road, Poole	Ronnie Genz	Geoff Mudge	Barry Briggs
18 May	Owlerton Stadium, Sheffield	Nigel Boocock	John Dews	Martin Ashby
18 May	Oxford Stadium, Oxford	Roy Trigg	Eddie Reeves	Peter Moore
18 May	Wimbledon Stadium, London	Reg Luckhurst	Trevor Hedge	Dave Younghusband
19 May	Monmore Green, Wolverhampton	Ken McKinlay	Barry Briggs	Jim Airey
19 May	White City, Glasgow	Charlie Monk	Bob Kilby	Maury Mattingley
20 May	Hyde Road, Manchester	Ronnie Genz	Cyril Maidment	Colin Pratt
20 May	Brandon Stadium, Coventry	Nigel Boocock	Rick France	Alf Wells
20 May	The Shay, Halifax	Dave Younghusband	Eric Boocock	Ken McKinlay
22 May	Brough Park, Newcastle	Ivan Mauger	George Hunter	Bob Kilby
23 May	Long Eaton Stadium, Long Eaton	Ray Wilson	Bert Harkins	Tommy Roper

=== Nordic qualification ===
- 4 May
- (Sweden) Vetlanda Motorstadion, Vetlanda
- Top 8 to Nordic final

Pos.	Rider	Points
1	Ove Fundin	15
2	Per-Olof Söderman	14
3	Göte Nordin	12
4	Sven Sigurd	11
5	Gunnar Malmqvist	11
6	Anders Michanek	10
7	Lars Jansson	10
8	Leif Enecrona	8
9	Jonny Faafeng	7
10	Paul Wissing	6
11	Reidar Eide	6
12	Odd Fossengen	3
13	Einar Egedius	3
14	Matti Olin	1
15	Jouko Naskali	1
16	Timo Sinkkonen	0

- 4 May
- (Denmark) Selskov Stadium, Hillerød
- Top 8 to Nordic final

Pos.	Rider	Points
1	Olle Nygren	15
2	Bengt Larsson	14
3	Bengt Jansson	13
4	Sverre Harrfeldt	11
5	Hasse Holmqvist	11
6	Bernt Persson	10
7	Per Aulie	10
8	Ole Olsen	7
9	Kurt Bögh	6
10	Bo Josefsson	5
11	Kalevi Lahtinen	5
12	Conny Samuelsson	4
13	Öyvind S. Berg	3
14	Godtfred Andreasen	3
15	Sune Stark	2
16	Heikki Kaprali	1

=== Continental semi-finals ===
- 21 May
- (Soviet Union) Trud Stadium, Balakovo
- Top 8 to Continental final

Pos.	Rider	Points
1	(Poland) Andrzej Wyglenda	13
2	(Soviet Union) Boris Samorodov	13
3	(Soviet Union) Gennady Kurilenko	11
4	(East Germany) Jochen Dinse	10
5	(Poland) Stanislaw Ruarz	10
6	(East Germany) Jürgen Hehlert	9
7	(Poland) Jerzy Trzeszkowski	9
8	(Czechoslovakia) Miloslav Verner	9
9	(Czechoslovakia) Antonín Kasper Sr.	8
10	(Soviet Union) Sergej Ljatosinskij	7
11	(Soviet Union) Farid Szajnurov	6
12	(Hungary) Barnabas Gyepes	5
13	(Poland) Zbigniew Podlecki	4
14	(Czechoslovakia) Karel Průša	3
15	(Soviet Union) Gennadij Vianov	1
16	(Socialist Federal Republic of Yugoslavia) Drago Perko	0

- 21 May
- (Czechoslovakia) Slaný Speedway Stadium, Slaný
- Top 8 to Continental final

Pos.	Rider	Points
1	(Poland) Antoni Woryna	11
2	(Soviet Union) Igor Plechanov	11
3	(Czechoslovakia) Jan Holub I	10
4	(Poland) Pawel Waloszek	10
5	(Czechoslovakia) Pavel Mareš	10
6	(Poland) Edmund Migos	10
7	(Poland) Andrzej Pogorzelski	9
8	(Czechoslovakia) Luboš Tomíček Sr.	9
9	(Czechoslovakia) Antonín Šváb Sr.	9
10	(Soviet Union) Viktor Trofimov	8
11	(Soviet Union) Vladimir Smirnov	7
12	(Poland) Konstanty Pociejkewicz	5
13	(Poland) Joachim Maj	5
14	(Poland) Stanislaw Tkocz	2
15	(Soviet Union) Gabdrachman Kadyrov	2
16	(Czechoslovakia) Karel Buřič	1

== Third round ==
=== British/Commonwealth semi-finals ===
- 13 July
- (England) Wimbledon Stadium, London
- Top 8 to British final

Pos.	Rider	Points
1	(New Zealand) Barry Briggs	15
2	(England) Trevor Hedge	11
3	(England) Terry Betts	11
4	(England) Roy Trigg	11
5	(England) Ray Wilson	10
6	(New Zealand) Ivan Mauger	10
7	(England) Cyril Maidment	9
8	(England) Nigel Boocock	9
9	(Australia) Geoff Mudge	8
10	(England) Ivor Brown	7
11	(Scotland) Ken McKinlay	6
12	(England) Mike Watkin	4
13	(England) Alf Wells	2
14	(England) Dave Younghusband	2
15	(England) Chris Julian	1
16	(England) Jimmy Squibb	1

- 13 July
- (England) Owlerton Stadium, Sheffield
- Top 8 to British final

Pos.	Rider	Points
1	(England) Reg Luckhurst	13
2	(England) Eric Boocock	13
3	(England) Colin Pratt	10
4	(England) Mike Broadbanks	10
5	(England) Martin Ashby	10
6	(England) Rick France	9
7	(Australia) Jim Airey	9
8	(Scotland) George Hunter	9
9	(Australia) Charlie Monk	8
10	(England) Bob Kilby	7
11	(England) Norman Hunter	6
12	(England) Ronnie Genz	5
13	(England) Alan Cowland	3
14	(Scotland) Bert Harkins	3
15	(Australia) Neil Street	2
16	(England) Arnie Haley	2

=== Nordic Final ===
- 4 June 1967
- (Denmark) Selskov Stadium, Hillerød
- First 8 to European Final plus 1 reserve

Placing	Rider	Total	1	2	3	4	5	6	7	8	9	10	11	12	13	14	15	16	17	18	19	20	Pts	Pos	21
1	(Sweden) (7) Ove Fundin	15		3					3					3	3					3			15	1	
2	(Norway) (11) Sverre Harrfeldt	13			2				2		3					3						3	13	2	
3	(Sweden) (8) Leif Enecrona	11		1						2			3			2			3				11	3	
4	(Sweden) (13) Bernt Persson	10				3	2							2		0					3		10	4	
5	(Sweden) (2) Olle Nygren	9	2					3				3				1				0			9	5	
6	(Sweden) (9) Bengt Jansson	9			1		3						1					3		1			9	6	
7	(Sweden) (16) Anders Michanek	9				2				0	2						3			2			9	7	
8	(Sweden) (12) Gunnar Malmqvist	7			0					3		1			2						1		7	8	
9	(Sweden) (1) Lars Jansson	7	3				1				1				1				1				7	9	
10	(Sweden) (15) Bengt Larsson	7				F			1			2						2	2				7	10	
11	(Sweden) (3) Per Olof Söderman	6	-						0				2				2				2		6	11	
12	(Sweden) (4) Göte Nordin	4	0							1				1				0				2	4	12	
13	(Denmark) (6) Ole Olsen	3		2				X			0							1			0		3	13	
14	(Sweden) (14) Sven Sigurd	3				1		2					F		-							-	3	14	
15	(Sweden) (10) Hasse Holmqvist	3			3			F						-			-		-				3	15	
16	(Norway) (5) Per J.Aulie	2		0			-					0					1					1	2	16	
R1	(Norway) (R1) Johnny Faafeng	0	1				0																0	R1	
R2	(Denmark) (R2) Kurt Bøgh	0												0			0		0			0	0	R2	
Placing	Rider	Total	1	2	3	4	5	6	7	8	9	10	11	12	13	14	15	16	17	18	19	20	Pts	Pos	21

m - exclusion for exceeding two minute time allowance • t - exclusion for touching the tapes • x - other exclusion • e - retired or mechanical failure • f - fell • ns - non-starter • nc - non-classify

gate A - inside	gate B	gate C	gate D - outside

=== Continental Final ===
- 20 August 1967
- (Germany) Illerstadion, Kempten
- First 8 to European Final plus 1 reserve

Placing	Rider	Total	1	2	3	4	5	6	7	8	9	10	11	12	13	14	15	16	17	18	19	20	Pts	Pos	21
1	(Poland) (9) Andrzej Wyglenda	14			3		2						3					3		3			14	1	
2	(Poland) (6) Jerzy Trzeszkowski	14		3				3			3							2			3		14	2	
3	(Soviet Union) (13) Igor Plechanov	12				2	3							3		2					2		12	3	
4	(Poland) (8) Andrzej Pogorzelski	11		1						3			2			3			2				11	4	
5	(Poland) (1) Antoni Woryna	10	3				1				2				1				3				10	5	
6	(Czechoslovakia) (7) Jan Holub I	10		2					1					2	3					2			10	6	
7	(Czechoslovakia) (11) Luboš Tomíček Sr.	9			2				2		1					1						3	9	7	
8	(East Germany) (3) Jochen Dinse	8	2						3				X				3				0		8	8	
9	(Poland) (14) Stanislaw Rurarz	7				1		1					1		2							2	7	9	
10	(Poland) (12) Edmund Migoś	6			1					1		3			E						1		6	10	
11	(Poland) (15) Pawel Waloszek	5				3			0			1						1	E				5	11	
12	(Czechoslovakia) (16) Antonín Šváb Sr.	4				0				2	0						2			0			4	12	
13	(Czechoslovakia) (5) Miloslav Verner	3		0			0					2					1					0	3	13	
14	(East Germany) (2) Jürgen Hehlert	2	1					0				0				0				1			2	14	
15	(Soviet Union) (4) Boris Samorodov	1	0							0				0				0				1	1	15	
16	(Soviet Union) (10) Gennady Kurilenko	0			0			X						-			-		-				0	16	
R1	(Czechoslovakia) (R1) Antonín Kasper Sr.	4						2						1			E		1				4	R1	
Placing	Rider	Total	1	2	3	4	5	6	7	8	9	10	11	12	13	14	15	16	17	18	19	20	Pts	Pos	21

m - exclusion for exceeding two minute time allowance • t - exclusion for touching the tapes • x - other exclusion • e - retired or mechanical failure • f - fell • ns - non-starter • nc - non-classify

gate A - inside	gate B	gate C	gate D - outside

== Fourth round ==
=== British/Commonwealth Final ===
- 22 August 1967
- (England) West Ham Stadium, London
- First 6 to World Final plus 1 reserve

Placing	Rider	Total	1	2	3	4	5	6	7	8	9	10	11	12	13	14	15	16	17	18	19	20	Pts	Pos	21
1	(New Zealand) (6) Barry Briggs	15		3				3			3							3			3		15	1	
2	(New Zealand) (12) Ivan Mauger	13			2					3		3			3						2		13	2	
3	(England) (13) Eric Boocock	12				3	3							3		2					1		12	3	
4	(England) (11) Colin Pratt	11			3				3		1					1						3	11	4	
5	(England) (2) Rick France	11	2					2				2				3				2			11	5	
6	(England) (16) Ray Wilson	10				0				2	2						3			3			10	6	
7	(England) (15) Mike Broadbank	9				2			1			1						2	3				9	7	
8	(Australia) (14) Jim Airey	8				1		1					3		1							2	8	8	
9	(England) (1) Nigel Boocock	7	3				2				0				0				2				7	9	
10	(England) (5) Reg Luckhurst	6		2			1					0					2					1	6	10	
11	(England) (3) Martin Ashby	5	1						2				2				0				0		5	11	
12	(England) (10) Roy Trigg	5			1			0						2			1		1				5	12	
13	(England) (7) Terry Betts	3		E					0					E	2					1			3	13	
14	(England) (4) Trevor Hedge	3	0							1				1				1				0	3	14	
15	(England) (9) Cyril Maidment	1			0		0						1					0		0			1	15	
16	(Scotland) (8) George Hunter	1		1						0			0			E			0				1	16	
R1	(Australia) (R1) Charlie Monk	0																					0	R1	
R2	(Australia) (R2) Geoff Mudge	0																					0	R2	
Placing	Rider	Total	1	2	3	4	5	6	7	8	9	10	11	12	13	14	15	16	17	18	19	20	Pts	Pos	21

m - exclusion for exceeding two minute time allowance • t - exclusion for touching the tapes • x - other exclusion • e - retired or mechanical failure • f - fell • ns - non-starter • nc - non-classify

gate A - inside	gate B	gate C	gate D - outside

=== European Final ===
- 27 August 1967
- (Poland) Olympic Stadium, Wrocław
- First 10 to World Final plus 1 reserve

Placing	Rider	Total	1	2	3	4	5	6	7	8	9	10	11	12	13	14	15	16	17	18	19	20	Pts	Pos	21
1	(Poland) (11) Andrzej Wyglenda	14			2				3		3					3						3	14	1	
2	(Poland) (5) Andrzej Pogorzelski	13		3			2					3					3					2	13	2	
3	(Soviet Union) (9) Igor Plechanov	12			0		3						3					3		3			12	3	
4	(Poland) (1) Antoni Woryna	10	3				1				1				2				3				10	4	
5	(Sweden) (16) Bernt Persson	9				3				2	2						1			1			9	5	
6	(Poland) (7) Jerzy Trzeszkowski	8		2					1					E	3					2			8	6	
7	(Sweden) (10) Ove Fundin	8			1			0						3			2		2				8	7	
8	(Sweden) (6) Anders Michanek	8		1				2			0							2			3		8	8	
9	(Sweden) (3) Bengt Jansson	8	2						2				2				0				2		8	9	
10	(East Germany) (2) Jochen Dinse	7	0					3				2				2				F			7	10	3
11	(Czechoslovakia) (12) Jan Holub I	7			3					1		1			1						1		7	11	2
12	(Sweden) (14) Leif Enecrona	5				2		1					1		0							1	5	12	
13	(Norway) (8) Sverre Harrfeldt	3		0						3			E			E			E				3	13	
14	(Sweden) (4) Olle Nygren	3	1							0				2				F				0	3	14	
15	(Sweden) (15) Gunnar Malmqvist	3				1			0			0						1	1				3	15	
16	(Czechoslovakia) (13) Luboš Tomíček Sr.	2				0	0							1		1					0		2	16	
R1	(Sweden) (R1) Lars Jansson	0																					0	R1	
R2	(Poland) (R2) Stanislaw Rurarz	0																					0	R2	
Placing	Rider	Total	1	2	3	4	5	6	7	8	9	10	11	12	13	14	15	16	17	18	19	20	Pts	Pos	21

m - exclusion for exceeding two minute time allowance • t - exclusion for touching the tapes • x - other exclusion • e - retired or mechanical failure • f - fell • ns - non-starter • nc - non-classify

gate A - inside	gate B	gate C	gate D - outside

== World Final ==
- 16 September 1967
- (England) Wembley Stadium, London

Placing	Rider	Total	1	2	3	4	5	6	7	8	9	10	11	12	13	14	15	16	17	18	19	20	Pts	Pos	21
1	(Sweden) (7) Ove Fundin	14		3					3					3	2					3			14	1	3
2	(Sweden) (5) Bengt Jansson	14		2			3					3					3					3	14	2	2
3	(New Zealand) (16) Ivan Mauger	13				3				3	3						2			2			13	3	
4	(Soviet Union) (14) Igor Plechanov	12				2		3					3		3							1	12	4	
5	(New Zealand) (6) Barry Briggs	11		1				2			2							3			3		11	5	
6	(Sweden) (8) Anders Michanek	9		0						2			2			3			2				9	6	
7	(England) (11) Eric Boocock	9			3				2		1					1						2	9	7	
8	(England) (3) Ray Wilson	7	3										1				1				2		7	8	
9	(Poland) (9) Andrzej Pogorzelski	6			2		2						0					1		1			6	9	
10	(Sweden) (2) Bernt Persson	6	2					1				1				2				X			6	10	
11	(Poland) (12) Antoni Woryna	5			1					1		2			1						0		5	11	
12	(England) (15) Rick France	5				1			1			0						2	1				5	12	
13	(England) (10) Colin Pratt	4			0			0						1			0		3				4	13	
14	(Poland) (13) Jerzy Trzeszkowski	3				F	0							2		0					1		3	14	
15	(Poland) (1) Andrzej Wyglenda	2	1				1				0				0				0				2	15	
16	(East Germany) (4) Jochen Dinse	0	F							0				0				0				0	0	16	
R1	(England) (R1) Mike Broadbank	0																					0	R1	
R2	(Sweden) (R2) Leif Enecrona	0																					0	R2	
Placing	Rider	Total	1	2	3	4	5	6	7	8	9	10	11	12	13	14	15	16	17	18	19	20	Pts	Pos	21

m - exclusion for exceeding two minute time allowance • t - exclusion for touching the tapes • x - other exclusion • e - retired or mechanical failure • f - fell • ns - non-starter • nc - non-classify

gate A - inside	gate B	gate C	gate D - outside
