= 1968 Individual Speedway World Championship =

Motorcycle speedway world championship season

Seasons
- ← 1967 1969 →

The 1968 Individual Speedway World Championship was the 23rd edition of the official World Championship to determine the world champion rider.

Ivan Mauger won his first World title. Fellow countryman Barry Briggs finished second and Pole Edward Jancarz took the bronze medal.

== Format changes ==
The format of the Championship changed again for the 1968 event. It reverted to the 1966 system whereby six riders from the Swedish section would qualify for the World Final direct to be held in Sweden. All other nations had to go through various events to establish the other ten riders to qualify for the final.

== First round ==
Qualification results.

=== British/Commonwealth qualifying ===
- Top 32 to British/Commonwealth semi-finals

Date	Venue	Winner	2nd	3rd
25 May	King's Lynn Stadium, King's Lynn	Malcolm Simmons	Terry Betts	Ray Wilson
25 May	The Shay, Halifax	Jim Airey	Dave Younghusband	Greg Kentwell
25 May	Brandon Stadium, Coventry	Nigel Boocock	Norman Hunter	Dave Hemus
25 May	Hyde Road, Manchester	Ivan Mauger	Tommy Roper	Charlie Monk
27 May	Brough Park, Newcastle	Ivan Mauger	Barry Briggs	Bert Harkins
27 May	County Ground Stadium, Exeter	Martin Ashby	Jimmy Squibb	Eric Boocock
28 May	West Ham Stadium, London	Norman Hunter	Nigel Boocock	Ivan Mauger
28 May	Leicester Stadium, Leicester	Bill Andrew	Bob Kilby	John Boulger
29 May	Wimborne Road, Poole	John Boulger	Bill Andrew	Geoff Mudge
30 May	Oxford Stadium, Oxford	Colin Gooddy	Terry Betts	Ronnie Genz
30 May	Wimbledon Stadium, London	Martin Ashby	Nigel Boocock	Trevor Hedge
30 May	Owlerton Stadium, Sheffield	Charlie Monk	Colin Pratt	John Dews
31 May	Monmore Green, Wolverhampton	James Bond	Jim Airey	Peter Vandenberg
31 May	Hackney Wick Stadium, London	Barry Briggs	Colin Pratt	Les McGillivray
31 May	Somerton Park, Newport	Cyril Francis	Chris Julian	Eric Boothroyd
31 May	White City, Glasgow	Bob Kilby	Bert Harkins	Jim McMillan
1 June	Dudley Wood Stadium, Dudley	Bill Andrew	Trevor Hedge	Reg Luckhurst
1 June	Abeey Stadium, Swindon	Barry Briggs	Bob Kilby	Mike Broadbanks
1 June	Cliftonhill, Coatbridge	Martin Ashby	Ray Wilson	Colin Pratt

=== Continental qualifying ===
- Top 32 to Continantal semi-finals

Date	Venue	Winner	2nd	3rd
4 May	(East Germany) Meissen Speedway Stadium, Meissen	(Soviet Union) Boris Samorodov	(Czechoslovakia) Jan Holub I	(Poland) Antoni Woryna
5 May	(Socialist Federal Republic of Yugoslavia) Stadion Automoto Drustvo Svetozarevo	(Soviet Union) Gennady Kurilenko	(Poland) Joachim Maj	(Soviet Union) Yuri Chekranov
5 May	(Hungary) Borsod Volán Stadion, Miskolc	(Poland) Konstanty Pociejkewicz	(Poland) Henryk Glucklich	(Soviet Union) Viktor Trofimov
5 May	(West Germany) Abensberger Stadion, Abensberg	(Poland) Jan Mucha	(Soviet Union) Igor Plekhanov	(Czechoslovakia) Luboš Tomíček Sr.

== Second round ==
=== Norwegian qualifying (top 8) ===
- 1 October 1967 (elimination format)
- (Norway) Sandnes Idrettspark, Sandnes
- Top 8 to Nordic final 1968

Pos.	Rider	time/note
1	Reidar Eide	1.21.1
2	Oyvind S. Berg	1.22.6
3	Odd Fossengen	1.24.0
4	Sverre Harrfeldt	1.24.0
5	Einar Egedius	sf 1.24.5
6	Sven Svensrud	sf 1.28.2
7	Ulf Lovaas	sf fell
8	Thorbjorn Nygaard	sf fell

=== Finnish qualifying (top 8) ===
- (2 rounds) ? & 30 Aug 1967
- (Finland) Eteläpuisto, Tampere & Kärpänen Speedway, Lahti
- Top 3 to Nordic final 1968

Pos.	Rider	Points	Total
1	Matti Olin	6+8	14+3
2	Kalevi Lahtinen	8+6	14+2
3	Veikko Metsahuone	4+3	7
4	Jouko Naskali	0+4	4
5	Reijo Tolviander	3+1	4
6	Reima Lohkovouri	0+2	2
7	Olavi Turunen	2+0	2
8	Timo Sinkkonen	1+0	1

=== British/Commonwealth semi-finals ===
- 27 June
- (England) Owlerton Stadium, Sheffield
- Top 8 to British final

Pos.	Rider	Points
1	(New Zealand) Barry Briggs	14
2	(New Zealand) Bill Andrew	13
3	(England) Norman Hunter	13
4	(England) Nigel Boocock	11
5	(England) Mike Broadbank	10
6	(Australia) Peter Vandenberg	10
7	(England) Dave Younghusband	9
8	(Scotland) Jim McMillan	
9	(Australia) Jim Airey	7
10	(England) Colin Pratt	6
11	(England) Bob Andrews	6
12	(England) Tommy Roper	5
13	(England) Arnie Haley	3
14	(England) Chris Julian	3
15	(England) Jimmy Squibb	2
16	(Scotland) Bert Harkins	1

- 2 July
- (England) Wimborne Road, Poole
- Top 8 to British final

Pos.	Rider	Points
1	(New Zealand) Ivan Mauger	14
2	(England) Martin Ashby	14
3	(England) Terry Betts	12
4	(Australia) Charlie Monk	10
5	(England) Ray Wilson	10
6	(England) Eric Boocock	9
7	(England) Trevor Hedge	9
8	(Australia) Geoff Mudge	9
9	(England) Reg Luckhurst	8
10	(England) James Bond	7
11	(England) Colin Gooddy	7
12	(Australia) John Boulger	3
13	(New Zealand) Wayne Briggs	3
14	(Australia) Greg Kentwell	3
15	(England) Eric Boothroyd	1
16	(England) Bob Kilby	1

== Third round ==
=== British/Commonwealth Final ===
- 11 July 1968
- (England) Wimbledon Stadium, London
- First 10 to British-Nordic Final plus 1 reserve

Placing	Rider	Total	1	2	3	4	5	6	7	8	9	10	11	12	13	14	15	16	17	18	19	20	Pts	Pos	21
1	(New Zealand) (12) Ivan Mauger	15			3					3		3			3						3		15	1	
2	(New Zealand) (14) Barry Briggs	14				3		3					3		2							3	14	2	
3	(England) (5) Eric Boocock	13		3			3					2					3					2	13	3	
4	(England) (11) Martin Ashby	10			1				3		2					3						1	10	4	
5	(England) (6) Trevor Hedge	10		2				2			3							3			0		10	5	
6	(England) (10) Nigel Boocock	9			2			1						1			2		3				9	6	
7	(England) (13) Norman Hunter	9				1	2							3		2					1		9	7	
8	(Scotland) (4) Jim McMillan	8	3							1				2				2				0	8	8	
9	(England) (1) Terry Betts	7	2				1				1				1				2				7	9	
10	(England) (3) Dave Younghusband	6	1						0				2				1				2		6	10	
11	(Australia) (15) Geoff Mudge	6				2			1			1						1	1				6	11	
12	(Australia) (8) Charlie Monk	5		1						2			1			1			0				5	12	
13	(England) (16) Mike Broadbanks	3				0				0	E						0			3			3	13	
14	(England) (2) Ray Wilson	2	0					0				0				0				2			2	14	
15	(Australia) (9) Peter Vandenberg	1			0		0						0					0		1			1	15	
16	(New Zealand) (7) Bill Andrew	0		F					-					-	-					-			0	16	
R1	(England) (R1) Reg Luckhurst	2							2						F								2	R1	
R2	(Australia) (R2) Jim Airey	0												X						0			0	R2	
Placing	Rider	Total	1	2	3	4	5	6	7	8	9	10	11	12	13	14	15	16	17	18	19	20	Pts	Pos	21

m - exclusion for exceeding two minute time allowance • t - exclusion for touching the tapes • x - other exclusion • e - retired or mechanical failure • f - fell • ns - non-starter • nc - non-classify

gate A - inside	gate B	gate C	gate D - outside

=== Nordic Final ===
- 2 June 1968
- (Denmark) Selskov Stadium, Hillerød
- First 6 to British-Nordic Final, plus 1 reserve

Placing	Rider	Total	1	2	3	4	5	6	7	8	9	10	11	12	13	14	15	16	17	18	19	20	Pts	Pos	21
1	(Norway) (10) Reidar Eide	14			3			3						3			2		3				14	1	
2	(Norway) (1) Øyvind S. Berg	13	3				3				2				3				2				13	2	
3	(Norway) (11) Odd Fossengen	12			1				3		3					3						2	12	3	
4	(Norway) (5) Sverre Harrfeldt	11		3			1					1					3					3	11	4	
5	(Denmark) (2) Ole Olsen	11	2					2				2				2				3			11	5	
6	(Denmark) (9) Godtfred Andreasen	11			2		2						2					3		2			11	6	
7	(Norway) (3) Per J.Aulie	9	1						2				3				0				3		9	7	
8	(Norway) (16) Ole Todnem	9				3				3	1						1			1			9	8	
9	(Denmark) (15) Kurt Bøgh	7				F			1			3						2	1				7	9	
10	(Denmark) (13) Preben Moller Christensen	6				2	0							2		0					2		6	10	
11	(Denmark) (8) Jens Ring	6		2						2			1			1			0				6	11	
12	(Norway) (14) Helgie Langlie	3				F		0					-		2							1	3	12	
13	(Finland) (4) Matti Olin	3	0							1				1				1				0	3	13	
14	(Norway) (6) Eidar Egedius	2		1				1			E							F			-		2	14	
15	(Finland) (7) Timo Laine	1		0					0					0	1					0			1	15	
16	(Finland) (12) Jouko Naskali	0			0					0		0			0						0		0	16	
R1	(Denmark) (R1) Per Ehlert	1																			1		1	R1	
Placing	Rider	Total	1	2	3	4	5	6	7	8	9	10	11	12	13	14	15	16	17	18	19	20	Pts	Pos	21

m - exclusion for exceeding two minute time allowance • t - exclusion for touching the tapes • x - other exclusion • e - retired or mechanical failure • f - fell • ns - non-starter • nc - non-classify

gate A - inside	gate B	gate C	gate D - outside

=== Continental semi-finals ===
- 26 May
- (Czechoslovakia) Mšeno Speedway Stadium, Mšeno
- Top 8 to Continental final

Pos.	Rider	Points
1	(Czechoslovakia) Luboš Tomíček Sr.	15
2	(Poland) Konstanty Pociejkewicz	12
3	(Poland) Jerzy Trzeszkowski	11
4	(Poland) Pawel Waloszek	11
5	(Soviet Union) Igor Plechanov	11
6	(Poland) Jan Mucha	10
7	(Soviet Union) Vladimir Smirnov	10
8	(Poland) Jan Pytko	9
9	(Czechoslovakia) Miloslav Verner	7
10	(Soviet Union) Gabdrachman Kadyrov	6
11	(Poland) Henryk Glücklich	5
12	(Soviet Union) Boris Zechanovitsch	5
13	(Czechoslovakia) Miroslav Šmíd	2
14	(Czechoslovakia) Antonín Kasper Sr.	2
15	(East Germany) Hans Jürgen Fritz (res)	2
16	(Hungary) Barnabas Gyepes	1
17	(Czechoslovakia) Jaroslav Volf (res)	1
18	(Soviet Union) Viktor Trofimov	0

- 26 May
- (Poland) Rybnik Municipal Stadium, Rybnik
- Top 8 to Continental final

Pos.	Rider	Points
1	(Poland) Antoni Woryna	13
2	(Poland) Joachim Maj	13
3	(Poland) Andrzej Wyglenda	12
4	(Soviet Union) Boris Samorodov	10
5	(Soviet Union) Gennadij Kurilenko	10
6	(Poland) Jerzy Padewski	9
7	(Czechoslovakia) Jan Holub I	8
8	(Poland) Edward Jancarz	8
9	(East Germany) Gerhard Uhlenbrock	8
10	(Soviet Union) Jurij Chekranov	6
11	(East Germany) Jochen Dinse	5
12	(Soviet Union) Farid Szajnurov	5
13	(East Germany) Jürgen Hehlert	4
14	(Czechoslovakia) Antonín Šváb Sr.	4
15	(Poland) Stanislaw Tkocz	3
16	(Czechoslovakia) Frantisek Ledecky	1

== Fourth round ==
=== Swedish Qualifying ===
- 28 April, Gamla Motorstadion, Målilla
- Top 8 to Swedish final

Pos.	Rider	Points
1	Ove Fundin	14
2	Bengt Jansson	13
3	Anders Michanek	11
4	Gunnar Malmqvist	11
5	Per-Olof Söderman	10
6	Bernt Persson	9
7	Tommy Johansson	9
8	Bengt Svensson	9
9	Conny Samuelsson	8
10	Leif Larsson	6
11	Sven-Inge Svensson	6
12	Sören Enander	6
13	Allan Dahlöf	4
14	Runo Wedin	3
15	Jan Holmqvist	3
16	Bo Magnusson	

- 1 May, Gamla Speedway Track, Visby
- Top 8 to Swedish final

Pos.	Rider	Points
1	Sören Sjösten	14
2	Torbjörn Harrysson	14
3	Olle Nygren	12
4	Göte Nordin	12
5	Bengt Larsson	10
6	Christer Löfqvist	9
7	Bo Josefsson	9
8	Therje Henriksson	9
9	Hasse Holmqvist	6
10	Sven Sigurd	4
11	Jan Svensson	4
12	Lars Jansson	4
13	Karl-Erik Andersson	3
14	Bengt Brannefors	3
15	Åke Andersson	3
16	Sixten Karlberg	2
17	Jan Stridh	2

=== British/Commonwealth/Nordic Final ===
- 6 August 1968
- (England) West Ham Stadium, London
- First 8 to European Final plus 1 reserve

Placing	Rider	Total	1	2	3	4	5	6	7	8	9	10	11	12	13	14	15	16	17	18	19	20	Pts	Pos	21
1	(New Zealand) (11) Ivan Mauger	15			3				3		3					3						3	15	1	
2	(England) (5) Nigel Boocock	13		3			3					3					2					2	13	2	3
3	(Norway) (16) Reidar Eide	13				2				3	2						3			3			13	3	2
4	(England) (7) Martin Ashby	11		2					2					3	3					1			11	4	
5	(Norway) (15) Sverre Harrfeldt	10				3			0			1						3	3				10	5	
6	(England) (9) Terry Betts	10			2		1						3					2		2			10	6	
7	(England) (1) Trevor Hedge	9	3				2				1				2				1				9	7	
8	(England) (3) Eric Boocock	7	2						1				2				1				1		7	8	
9	(England) (13) Norman Hunter	6				1	0							1		1					3		6	9	
10	(New Zealand) (12) Barry Briggs	6			1					F		2			1						2		6	10	
11	(Norway) (10) Odd Fossengen	5			0			3						2			0		0				5	11	
12	(Scotland) (8) Jim McMillan	5		0						2			1			0			2				5	12	
13	(Norway) (6) Øyvind S. Berg	4		1				2			0							1			0		4	13	
14	(Denmark) (2) Ole Olsen	4	1					1				0				2				F			4	14	
15	(England) (4) Dave Younghusband	1	0							1				0				0				F	1	15	
16	(Norway) (14) Godtfred Andreasen	0				0		0					0		-							-	0	16	
R1	(Norway) (R1) Per J.Aulle	1													0							1	1	R1	
R2	(Australia) (R2) Geoff Mudge	0																					0	R2	
Placing	Rider	Total	1	2	3	4	5	6	7	8	9	10	11	12	13	14	15	16	17	18	19	20	Pts	Pos	21

m - exclusion for exceeding two minute time allowance • t - exclusion for touching the tapes • x - other exclusion • e - retired or mechanical failure • f - fell • ns - non-starter • nc - non-classify

gate A - inside	gate B	gate C	gate D - outside

=== Continental Final ===
- 21 June 1968
- (Soviet Union) Stroitel Stadium, Ufa
- First 8 to European Final plus 1 reserve

Placing	Rider	Total	1	2	3	4	5	6	7	8	9	10	11	12	13	14	15	16	17	18	19	20	Pts	Pos	21
1	(Soviet Union) (2) Gennady Kurilenko	12	3					1				3				3				2			12	1	
2	(Poland) (6) Paweł Waloszek	10		2				3			3							2			0		10	2	
3	(Soviet Union) (16) Vladimir Smirnov	10				3				0	2						2			3			10	3	
4	(Poland) (15) Edward Jancarz	10				2			1			1						3	3				10	4	
5	(Poland) (13) Jerzy Trzeszkowski	10				1	3							3		2					1		10	5	
6	(Poland) (12) Antoni Woryna	9			2					2		2			1						2		9	6	
7	(Soviet Union) (11) Igor Plekhanov	8			3				3		0					0						2	8	7	3
8	(Poland) (3) Konstanty Pociejkewicz	8	2						0				F				3				3		8	8	2
9	(Poland) (7) Jerzy Padewski	8		3					2					0	3					F			8	9	1
10	(Czechoslovakia) (9) Jan Holub I	7			1		1						3					1		1			7	10	
11	(Poland) (1) Andrzej Wyglenda	7	1				2				1				2				1				7	11	
12	(Poland) (8) Zygmunt Pytko	6		0						3			2			1			0				6	12	
13	(Soviet Union) (10) Boris Samorodov	6			0			2						1			1		2				6	13	
14	(Poland) (5) Jan Mucha	4		1			0					0					0					3	4	14	
15	(Poland) (4) Joachim Maj	4	0							1				2				0				1	4	15	
16	(Czechoslovakia) (14) Luboš Tomíček Sr.	1				0		0					1		0							0	1	16	
R1	(East Germany) (R1) Gerhard Ulenbrock	0																					0	R1	
R2	(Czechoslovakia) (R2) Václav Verner	0																					0	R2	
Placing	Rider	Total	1	2	3	4	5	6	7	8	9	10	11	12	13	14	15	16	17	18	19	20	Pts	Pos	21

m - exclusion for exceeding two minute time allowance • t - exclusion for touching the tapes • x - other exclusion • e - retired or mechanical failure • f - fell • ns - non-starter • nc - non-classify

gate A - inside	gate B	gate C	gate D - outside

== Fifth round ==
=== Swedish Final ===
- Top 6 to World final, 1 reserve

Date	Venue	Winner	2nd	3rd
27 May	Malmö Stadion, Malmö	Gunnar Malmqvist	Anders Michanek	Hasse Holmqvist
28 May	Ullevi, Gothenburg	Bernt Persson	Gunnar Malmqvist	Torbjörn Harrysson
30 May	Ryd Motorstadion, Linköping	Ove Fundin	Bengt Jansson	Gunnar Malmqvist

Pos.	Rider	Points
1	Gunnar Malmqvist	38
2	Ove Fundin	35
3	Torbjörn Harrysson	31
4	Bernt Persson	30
5	Anders Michanek	29
6	Hasse Holmqvist	28
7	Bengt Jansson	27
8	Bengt Larsson	25
9	Sören Sjösten	23

Pos.	Rider	Points
10	Therje Henriksson	22
11	Bo Josefsson	15
12	Bengt Svensson	15
13	Christer Löfqvist	14
14	Olle Nygren	10
15	Tommy Johansson	9
16	Per Olof Söderman	8
17	Conny Samuelsson	2
18	Runo Wedin	1

=== European Final ===
- 25 August 1968
- (Poland) Olympic Stadium, Wrocław
- First 10 to World Final plus 1 reserve

Placing	Rider	Total	1	2	3	4	5	6	7	8	9	10	11	12	13	14	15	16	17	18	19	20	Pts	Pos	21
1	(Poland) (3) Paweł Waloszek	13	3						2				3				2				3		13	1	
2	(Poland) (5) Antoni Woryna	11		3			3					3					X					2	11	2	
3	(Poland) (16) Jerzy Trzeszkowski	11				2				2	2						3			2			11	3	
4	(New Zealand) (11) Ivan Mauger	10			1				3		1					2						3	10	4	
5	(New Zealand) (8) Barry Briggs	9		1						3			1			3			1				9	5	
6	(Soviet Union) (1) Gennady Kurilenko	9	2				2				3				0				2				9	6	
7	(Norway) (14) Reidar Eide	8				3		1					0		3							1	8	7	
8	(Poland) (10) Edward Jancarz	8			3			3						2			F		-				8	8	
9	(England) (12) Nigel Boocock	7			2					1		0			2						2		7	9	
10	(England) (2) Martin Ashby	6	1					2				1				1				1			6	10	3
11	(Soviet Union) (9) Igor Plekhanov	6			0		0						2					3		1			6	11	2
12	(Soviet Union) (6) Vladimir Smirnov	5		2				0			E							2			1		5	12	
13	(England) (4) Trevor Hedge	3	0							0				3				0				0	3	13	
14	(England) (7) Terry Betts	2		0					0					1	1					0			2	14	
15	(Norway) (13) Sverre Harrfeldt	2				1	1							F		-					-		2	15	
16	(Poland) (15) Konstanty Pociejkewicz	0				0			-			-						-	-				0	16	
R1	(Poland) (R1) Jerzy Padewski	7							1			2						1	3				7	R1	
R2	(Czechoslovakia) (R2) Václav Verner	0																					0	R2	
Placing	Rider	Total	1	2	3	4	5	6	7	8	9	10	11	12	13	14	15	16	17	18	19	20	Pts	Pos	21

m - exclusion for exceeding two minute time allowance • t - exclusion for touching the tapes • x - other exclusion • e - retired or mechanical failure • f - fell • ns - non-starter • nc - non-classify

gate A - inside	gate B	gate C	gate D - outside

== World Final ==
- 6 September 1968
- (Sweden) Ullevi, Gothenburg

Placing	Rider	Total	1	2	3	4	5	6	7	8	9	10	11	12	13	14	15	16	17	18	19	20	Pts	Pos	21
1	(New Zealand) (6) Ivan Mauger	15		3				3			3							3			3		15	1	
2	(New Zealand) (5) Barry Briggs	12		2			2					3					3					2	12	2	
3	(Poland) (7) Edward Jancarz	11		1					3					1	3					3			11	3	3
4	(Soviet Union) (9) Gennady Kurilenko	11			2		3						3					1		2			11	4	2
5	(Poland) (4) Paweł Waloszek	10	F							2				3				2				3	10	5	
6	(Sweden) (12) Torbjörn Harrysson	10			3					3		2			1						1		10	6	
7	(Sweden) (1) Anders Michanek	9	3				1				2				2				1				9	7	
8	(Sweden) (10) Hasse Holmqvist	9			1			2						2			2		2				9	8	
9	(Sweden) (15) Ove Fundin	7				3			0			1						0	3				7	9	
10	(Sweden) (11) Gunnar Malmqvist	7			0				2		1					3						1	7	10	
11	(England) (2) Martin Ashby	5	2					1				0				2				0			5	11	
12	(Poland) (16) Antoni Woryna	5				2				1	R						1			1			5	12	
14	(Norway) (8) Reidar Eide	3		0						0			2			1			F				3	14	
13	(Poland) (3) Jerzy Trzeszkowski	4	1						1				0				0				2		4	13	
15	(Sweden) (14) Bernt Persson	1				E		0					1		0							0	1	15	
16	(England) (13) Nigel Boocock	1				1	0							0		X					E		1	16	
R1	(Soviet Union) (R1) Igor Plekhanov	0																					0	R1	
R2	(Sweden) (R2) Bengt Jansson	0																					0	R2	
Placing	Rider	Total	1	2	3	4	5	6	7	8	9	10	11	12	13	14	15	16	17	18	19	20	Pts	Pos	21

m - exclusion for exceeding two minute time allowance • t - exclusion for touching the tapes • x - other exclusion • e - retired or mechanical failure • f - fell • ns - non-starter • nc - non-classify

gate A - inside	gate B	gate C	gate D - outside
