= Wimbledon Internationale =

British motorcycle speedway competition

- Category: motorcycle speedway
- Country: United Kingdom
- Inaugural season: 1961
- Folded: 1982

The Wimbledon Internationale sponsored by Embassy was an individual motorcycle speedway event that was hosted annually at Wimbledon Stadium in London, England.

== History ==
The event was first run during July 1961, as compensation to the British public for losing the rights to host the Speedway World Championship every year. The first final of the event was awarded to Harringay Stadium by the Fédération Internationale de Motocyclisme but passed to Wimbledon permanently from 1962. The event was significant because it attracted entries from most of the world's leading riders. In 1961, there were ten qualifying events.

It was discontinued after the 1981 edition.

== Past winners ==
Year	First	Second	Third
1961	(Sweden) Ove Fundin	(New Zealand) Ronnie Moore	(England) Peter Craven
1962	(Sweden) Ove Fundin	(New Zealand) Barry Briggs	(England) Peter Craven
1963	(Sweden) Ove Fundin	(Sweden) Björn Knutson	(Norway) Sverre Harrfeldt
1964	(New Zealand) Barry Briggs	(Scotland) Ken McKinlay	(Sweden) Ove Fundin
1965	(Australia) Charlie Monk	(Sweden) Björn Knutson	(Sweden) Göte Nordin
1966	(Sweden) Göte Nordin	(New Zealand) Barry Briggs	(Sweden) Ove Fundin
1967	(Sweden) Göte Nordin	(Sweden) Torbjörn Harrysson	(New Zealand) Ivan Mauger
1968	(England) Nigel Boocock	(Sweden) Bengt Jansson	(New Zealand) Barry Briggs
1969	(England) Trevor Hedge	(New Zealand) Ivan Mauger	(New Zealand) Barry Briggs
1970	(New Zealand) Ivan Mauger	(England) Trevor Hedge	(New Zealand) Ronnie Moore
1971	(New Zealand) Ivan Mauger	(Australia) Garry Middleton	(New Zealand) Ronnie Moore
1972	(New Zealand) Ivan Mauger	(New Zealand) Ronnie Moore	(Sweden) Bengt Jansson
1973	(Denmark) Ole Olsen	(Sweden) Anders Michanek	(Sweden) Tommy Jansson
1974	(England) Peter Collins	(England) Ray Wilson	(Denmark) Ole Olsen
1975	(Denmark) Ole Olsen	(Australia) Phil Crump	(England) Ray Wilson
1976	(England) Malcolm Simmons	(England) Chris Morton	(England) Michael Lee
1977	(Poland) Edward Jancarz	(New Zealand) Larry Ross	(Australia) Phil Crump
1978	(England) Peter Collins	(England) Malcolm Simmons	(England) John Davis
1979	(England) Michael Lee	(England) John Davis	(Poland) Edward Jancarz
1980	(England) Dave Jessup	(United States) Bruce Penhall	(Denmark) Hans Nielsen
1981	(Denmark) Hans Nielsen	(England) Kenny Carter	(Sweden) Jan Andersson
