= London Riders' Championship =

British motorcycle speedway competition

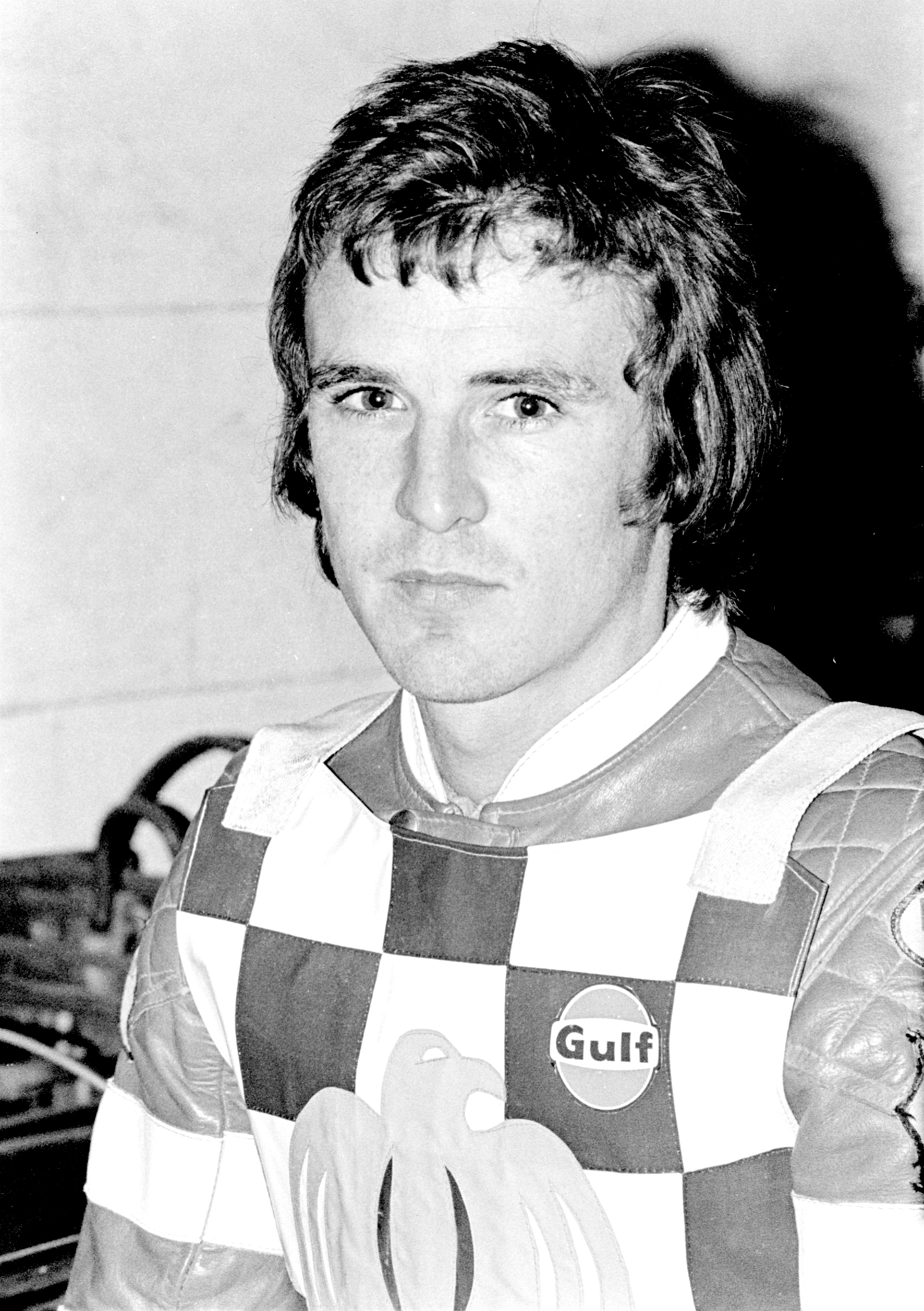
- Barry Thomas, twice winner
- Sport: motorcycle speedway
- Founded: 1930
- Folded: 1997
- Country: United Kingdom

The London Riders' Championship was an individual motorcycle speedway competition for top riders of teams from London. It was a prestigious competition, especially in its early days.

== History ==
The event was introduced in 1930. It was considered a prestigious competition, especially in its early days due to the fact that the leading teams in British speedway at the time were all from London. However, as the number of teams from London dwindled, so did interest in the competition. The last competition was held in 1983.

An attempted revival of the Championship was made in 2011 at the Arena Essex Raceway speedway track in Purfleet, Essex, where the riders taking part represented not their current clubs, but long-defunct London clubs including West Ham Hammers, New Cross Rangers, Wembley Lions and Walthamstow Wolves. It was staged there as the track, home of the Lakeside Hammers was the closest track to London staging speedway at the time. However, the meeting was abandoned after only a few heats due to heavy rain and was never restaged.

== Past winners ==
| Year | Winner | Team | Venue |
| 1930 | Jack Ormston ( (England) ) | Wembley Lions | Crystal Palace Exhibition Grounds |
| 1931 | Joe Francis ( (England) ) | Crystal Palace Glaziers | Crystal Palace Exhibition Grounds |
Championship suspended 1932-1933
| 1934 | Tom Farndon ( (England) ) | New Cross Lambs | New Cross Stadium |
| 1935 | Tom Farndon ( (England) ) | New Cross Lambs | New Cross Stadium |
| 1936 | Vic Huxley ( (Australia) ) | Wimbledon Dons | New Cross Stadium |
| 1937 | Jack Milne ( (United States) ) | New Cross Rangers | New Cross Stadium |
| 1938 | Eric Chitty ( (Canada) ) | West Ham Hammers | New Cross Stadium |
| 1939 | Jack Milne ( (United States) ) | New Cross Rangers | New Cross Stadium |
Championship suspended 1939-1944
| 1945 | Ron Johnson ( (Australia) ) | unattached | New Cross Stadium |
| 1946 | Ron Johnson ( (Australia) ) | New Cross Rangers | New Cross Stadium |
| 1947 | Vic Duggan ( (Australia) ) | Harringay Racers | New Cross Stadium |
| 1948 | Split Waterman ( (England) ) | Wembley Lions | New Cross Stadium |
| 1949 | Alec Statham ( (England) ) | Wimbledon Dons | New Cross Stadium |
| 1950 | Cyril Roger ( (England) ) | New Cross Rangers | New Cross Stadium |
| 1951 | Aub Lawson ( (Australia) ) | West Ham Hammers | New Cross Stadium |
| 1952 | Ronnie Moore ( (New Zealand) ) | Wimbledon Dons | New Cross Stadium |
| 1953 | Jack Young ( (Australia) ) | West Ham Hammers | Harringay Stadium |
| 1954 | Jack Young ( (Australia) ) | West Ham Hammers | West Ham Stadium |
| 1955 | Barry Briggs ( (New Zealand) ) | Wimbledon Dons | Wimbledon Stadium |
| 1956 | Brian Crutcher ( (England) ) | Wembley Lions | Wembley Stadium |
Championship suspended 1957-1962
| 1963* | Norman Hunter ( (England) ) | Hackney Hawks | Hackney Wick Stadium |
| 1964 | Mike Broadbanks ( (England) ) | Swindon Robins | West Ham Stadium |
| 1965 | Sverre Harrfeldt ( (Norway) ) | West Ham Hammers | Hackney Wick Stadium |
| 1966 | Norman Hunter ( (England) ) | West Ham Hammers | Hackney Wick Stadium |
| 1967 | Colin Pratt ( (England) ) | Hackney Hawks | Hackney Wick Stadium |
| 1968 | Colin Pratt ( (England) ) | Hackney Hawks | Hackney Wick Stadium |
| 1969 | Trevor Hedge ( (England) ) | Wimbledon Dons | Hackney Wick Stadium |
| 1970 | Trevor Hedge ( (England) ) | Wimbledon Dons | Hackney Wick Stadium |
| 1971 | Bengt Jansson ( (Sweden) ) | Hackney Hawks | Hackney Wick Stadium |
| 1972 | Ronnie Moore ( (New Zealand) ) | Wimbledon Dons | Hackney Wick Stadium |
| 1973 | Barry Thomas ( (England) ) | Hackney Hawks | Hackney Wick Stadium |
| 1974 | Barry Thomas ( (England) ) | Hackney Hawks | Hackney Wick Stadium |
| 1975 | Dave Jessup ( (England) ) | Leicester Lions | Hackney Wick Stadium |
| 1976 | Gordon Kennett ( (England) ) | White City Rebels | Hackney Wick Stadium |
| 1977 | Larry Ross ( (New Zealand) ) | Wimbledon Dons | Hackney Wick Stadium |
| 1978 | Keith White ( (England) ) | Hackney Hawks | Hackney Wick Stadium |
Championship suspended 1979
| 1980 | Finn Thomsen ( (Denmark) ) | Hackney Hawks | Hackney Wick Stadium |
Championship suspended 1981
| 1982 | Kai Niemi ( (Finland) ) | Wimbledon Dons | Wimbledon Stadium |
| 1983 | Bo Petersen ( (Denmark) ) | Hackney Hawks | Hackney Wick Stadium |
| 1988 | Andy Galvin ( (England) ) | Hackney Kestrels | Hackney Wick Stadium |
| 1996 | Billy Hamill ( (United States) ) | Cradley & Stoke | London Stadium |

* 1963 - Provincial League London Riders Championship
