= Howard Cole (speedway rider) =

Welsh motorcycle racer

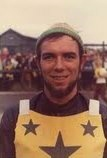
- Born: 29 December 1943 (age 82); Cardiff, Wales
- Nickname: Kid Bodie
- Nationality: British (Welsh)

Career history
- 1961: Wolverhampton Wolves
- 1962–1963: Stoke Potters
- 1964–1965: Long Eaton Archers
- 1966, 1973-1974: Cradley Heathens/United
- 1967–1972: King's Lynn Stars

Individual honours
- 1967: New Zealand Champion
- 1964: Ace of Herts Trophy
- 1969: Pride of the East

Team honours
- 1973: Pottinger Best Pairs Trophy

George Howard Cole (born 29 December 1943) in Cardiff, Wales is a former international motorcycle speedway rider. For much of his career, he was known as Kid Brodie and did not ride under his birth name.

== Career summary ==
Cole first appeared at the age of three in a short British Pathe film titled Child Motorcyclist 1948.

Cole began riding speedway in 1961 for the Wolverhampton Wolves when he was 17. Because he was still at Wolverhampton Grammar School at the time, he rode under the nom de plume "Kid Bodie" so that the school would not find out. He also used the nom de plume because he had been a mascot for the Wolverhampton and Birmingham teams in the early 1950s and did not want this to be known at the time. The following year, he transferred to Stoke and rode for the Potters until he broke his arm in 1963. In 1964-1965, he rode for the Long Eaton Archers. In 1966, he joined the Cradley Heathens for a year. He then had six years with the King's Lynn Stars before rejoining Cradley for two seasons in 1973–1974. He qualified for and rode in the 1969 World Final at Wembley.

Cole also rode in three British Championship finals from 1969 to 1971 and won the New Zealand Championship in Christchurch in 1967. He regularly rode in New Zealand and Australia during the English winter months and represented England in team contests in the United Kingdom, Australia and New Zealand. At retirement, he had earned ten international caps for the England national speedway team and one cap for Great Britain. With no Welsh national team, Welsh riders were eligible to ride for England.

After retiring from speedway, Cole moved to live in Sydney. He graduated with a teaching degree in 1978 and taught at Sydney Grammar Prep School until his retirement in 2003.

== World Final Appearances ==
- 1969 – (England) London, Wembley Stadium – 16th – 1 pt
