= Jerzy Trzeszkowski =

Polish speedway rider

- Born: 10 January 1945; Wełecz, Poland
- Nationality: Polish

Career history

Poland
- 1963-1974: Wrocław

Great Britain
- 1978: Swindon Robins

Sweden
- 1977-1981: Kaparna

Individual honours
- 1967, 1968: Speedway World Championship finalist

Team honours
- 1980: Allsvenskan Div 2 (South) Champion

Jerzy Trzeszkowski (born 10 January 1945) is a former international motorcycle speedway rider from Poland. He earned 24 international caps for the Poland national speedway team.

== Speedway career ==
Trzeszkowski reached the final of the Speedway World Championship on two occasions in the 1967 Individual Speedway World Championship and the 1968 Individual Speedway World Championship. He toured the United Kingdom with Poland for the first time in 1967.

Trzeszkowski rode in the top tier of British Speedway, riding for Swindon Robins, with fellow Pole Leonard Raba, during the 1978 British League season.

== World final appearances ==
=== Individual World Championship ===
- 1967 – (England) London, Wembley Stadium – 14th – 3pts
- 1968 – (Sweden) Gothenburg, Ullevi – 14th – 3pts

=== World Team Cup ===
- 1967 - (Sweden) Malmö, Malmö Stadion (with Antoni Woryna / Andrzej Wyglenda / Andrzej Pogorzelski / Zbigniew Podlecki) - 2nd - 26pts (4)
