= Hasse Holmqvist =

Swedish speedway rider

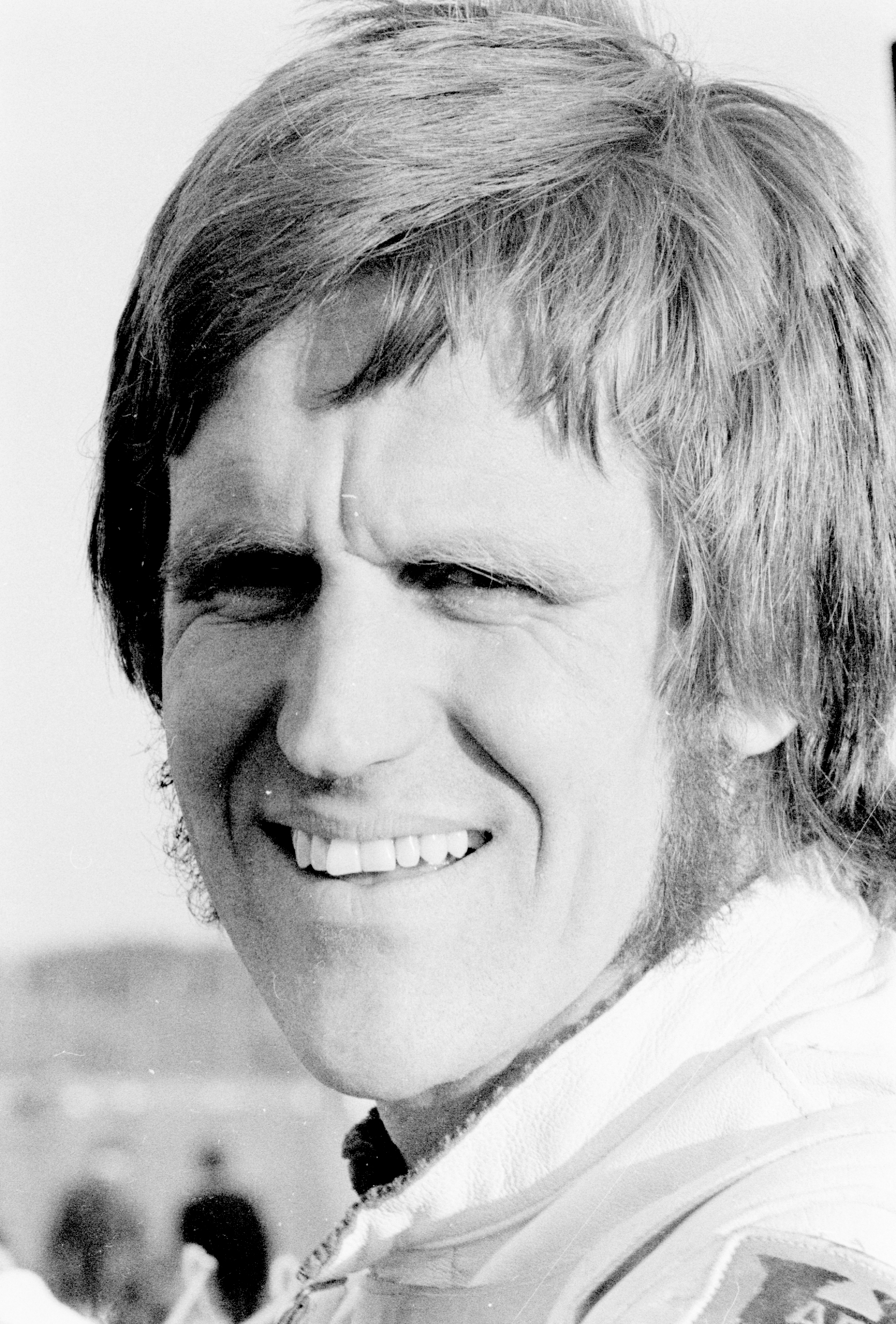
- Born: 18 June 1945 (age 81); Avesta, Sweden
- Nationality: Swedish

Career history

Sweden
- 1962-1963: Folkare
- 1964-1965, 1969-1971: Masarna
- 1966-1967: Taxarna
- 1968-1969, 1971-1972: Vargarna
- 1973-1981, 1983: Indianerna

Great Britain
- 1967-1968: Wolverhampton Wolves
- 1970, 1973, 1975: Oxford Cheetahs

Individual honours
- 1968, 1969: Speedway World Championship finalist

Team honours
- 1973: Allsvenskan Div 2 West Champion

Hans Ulof Holmqvist (born 18 June 1945) is a Swedish former motorcycle speedway rider. During his career, he was known as Hasse Holmqvist. He earned 30 caps for the Sweden national speedway team.

== Speedway career ==
Holmqvist was a leading speedway rider in the late 1960s. He reached the final of the Speedway World Championship in the 1968 Individual Speedway World Championship and the 1969 Individual Speedway World Championship.

Hulmqvist won the silver medal in 1975 and bronze medal in 1968 at the Swedish Championship.

Hulmqvist rode in the top tier of British Speedway from 1967 until 1975. He rode for Wolverhampton Wolves from 1967 to 1968 and Oxford Cheetahs in 1970, 1973 and 1975.

== World final appearances ==
=== Individual World Championship ===
- 1968 – (Sweden) Gothenburg, Ullevi – 8th – 9pts
- 1969 – (England) London, Wembley Stadium – 5th – 10pts

=== World Pairs Championship ===
- 1972 - (Sweden) Borås, Ryavallen (with Bernt Persson) - 3rd - 22pts (9)

=== Individual Ice Speedway World Championship ===
- 1971 (West Germany) Inzell, 12th – 11pts
