= Bengt Brannefors =

Swedish motorcycle speedway rider (1936–2008)

- Born: 31 May 1936; Gothenburg, Sweden
- Died: January 2008 (aged 71)
- Nationality: Swedish

Career history

Sweden
- 1953–1971, 1974: Kaparna
- 1972–1973: Vargarna

Great Britain
- 1961: Oxford Cheetahs
- 1961: New Cross Rangers
- 1962: Ipswich Witches
- 1970–1971: Newport Wasps
- 1971: Wolverhampton Wolves

Team honours
- 1968, 1970: Swedish league championship

Bengt Brannefors (31 May 1936 – January 2008) was a Swedish motorcycle speedway rider. He earned 20 international caps for the Sweden national speedway team.

== Biography ==
Brannefors began his speedway career racing for Kaparna during the 1953 Swedish speedway season. He was part of the Kaparna team that secured two league championships in 1968 and 1970.

Brannefors' performances in Sweden were noticed by the British teams, which resulted in New Cross Rangers signing him for the 1961 Speedway National League season. However, his time at New Cross was short because promoter Johnnie Hoskins dropped him. He moved to ride a couple of times for Oxford Cheetahs before joining Ipswich Witches for the 1962 season but again only rode a few matches because Ipswich withdrew from the league.

Brannefors continued to ride in Sweden and made several attempts to return to Britain but league restrictions and issues over overseas riders caused various problems in securing a team, despite interest from clubs. He finally returned to ride for Newport Wasps during the 1970 British League season. Unfortunately he continued to have issues with external matters and was subject to work permit problems during the season. The problems he encountered were somewhat responsible for being unable to gain consistency in Britain, which affected his average.

The following season in 1971, Brannefors rode for Newport and Wolverhampton Wolves, which was his last in the United Kingdom. He rode for Vargarna before completing one more season with Kaparna in 1974.

== Family ==
His son Pierre Brannefors was also a professional speedway rider.
