= Nigel Boocock =

British motorcycle speedway rider (1937–2015)

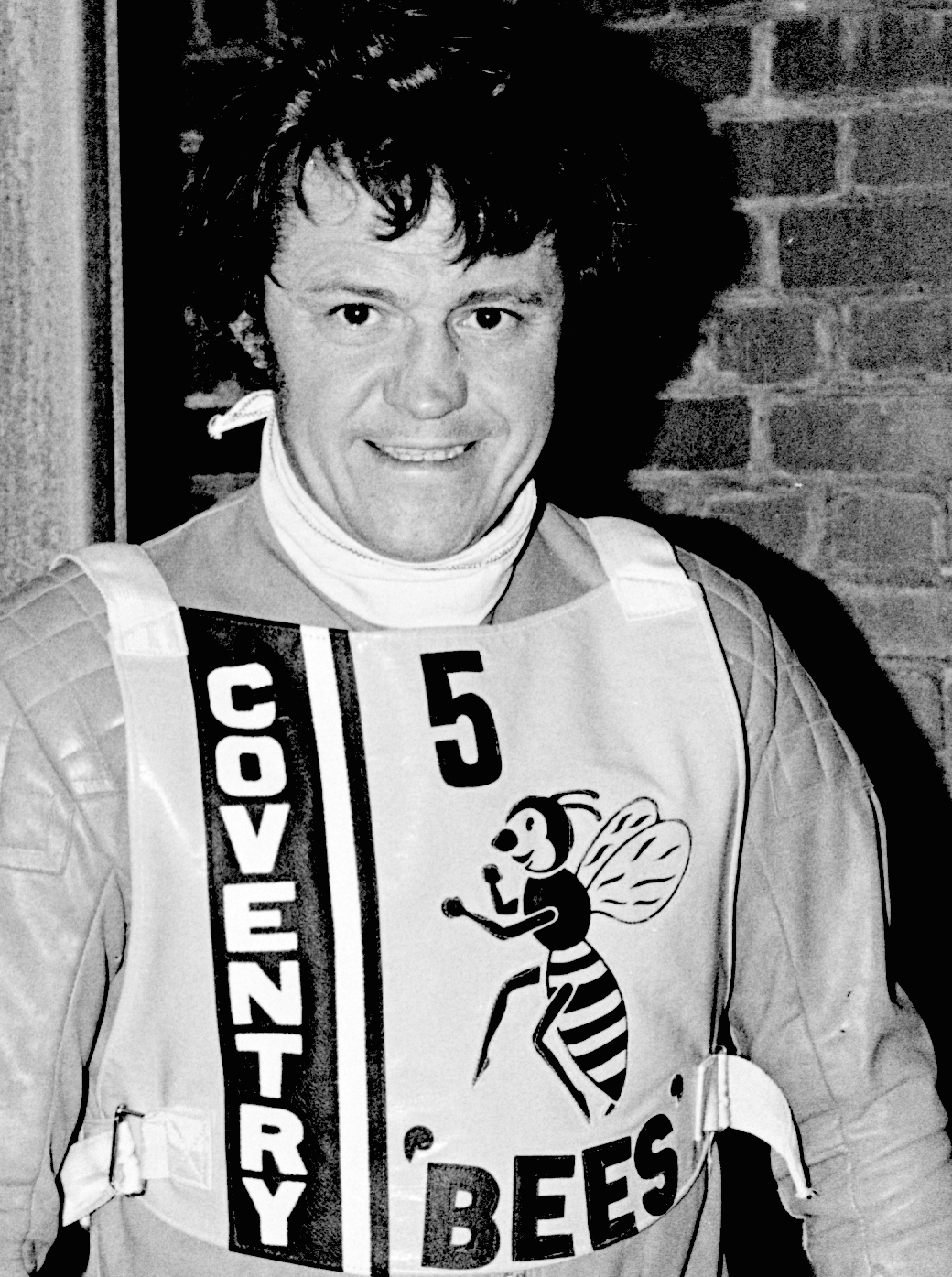
- Born: 17 September 1937; Wakefield, England
- Died: 3 April 2015 (aged 77); Queensland, Australia

Career history
- 1955–1957: Bradford Tudors
- 1957: Birmingham Brummies
- 1958: Ipswich Witches
- 1959–1976: Coventry Bees
- 1977–1978: Bristol Bulldogs
- 1979–1980: Exeter Falcons
- 1979: Canterbury Crusaders
- 1980: Swindon Robins

Individual honours
- 1962, 1968: Midland Riders' Champion
- 1966: The Laurels
- 1966: Brandonapolis
- 1968: Internationale
- 1969: South Australian Champion

Team honours
- 1968: World Cup winner
- 1960, 1969, 1970: World Cup silver
- 1964, 1965: World Cup bronze
- 1969, 1970: World Pairs bronze
- 1968: British League
- 1967: BL KO Cup
- 1960, 1966, 1969, 1970, 1971, 1976: Midland Cup
- 1961: Central Shield

Nigel Boocock (17 September 1937 – 3 April 2015) was a motorcycle speedway rider from England. who appeared in eight Speedway World Championship finals. He holds the record number of caps for Great Britain (64) and the record for total number of caps, when including England (154).

== Career ==
Born in Wakefield, England, Boocock started his career with the Bradford Tudors during the 1955 season and stayed there until the end of the 1957 season (Bradford replaced Birmingham Brummies during August of the 1957 season).

After spending the 1958 season with the Ipswich Witches, Boocock moved in 1959 to the Coventry Bees. He found a permanent home with the Bees and spent the next eighteen seasons with them. His career also took off in terms of success and was regularly called up to represent his country. In his first season with the Bees he topped the Coventry averages and won the Midland Cup in 1960.

As one of Coventry's leading riders Boocock was called up by England for the 1960 Speedway World Team Cup, taking a silver medal at the event. He would reach multiple Speedway World Championship finals from 1963 to 1972 and was the World Pairs bronze medal winner in 1969 and 1970, the latter with his brother Eric. Two further bronze medals came in the World Team Cup (1964 and 1965) before his career best achievement, winning the World Cup with Great Britain in 1968 at Wembley.

On the domestic front, Boocock won the British League Championship in 1968 and five more Midland Cup wins.

Boocock was known for the blue leathers he raced in, when most other riders wore black leathers – he was nicknamed "Little Boy Blue". He appeared with brother Eric Boocock in the 1970 Speedway World Pairs Championship finals, finishing in third place.

At retirement, Boocock had earned 90 international caps for the England national speedway team and 64 caps for Great Britain (a record) for a combined total of 154 caps (also a record).

== Personal life ==
Boocock married Cynthia Boon in 1958, and they had three children, Victoria, Darren and Mandy. He and Cynthia retired to Australia, which he had visited on numerous occasions with British Lions and England teams during the English winter months. For some time, they lived in Maroubra (Sydney), NSW.

In 2006, Boocock, who continued to support junior speedway and speedway in general, joined former World Champion Ivan Mauger, and other guests such as John Boulger and Bill Wigzell, Australian flagman Glen Dix, and former Rowley Park Speedway promoter Kym Bonython for the official opening of a junior speedway track on the infield of one of Australia's premier motorcycle speedways, the Gillman Speedway in Adelaide. Bonython officially opened the 111-metre-long track, with Boocock and Boulger acting as starting marshals for the night.

In 2008, Boocock's son Darren, a former rider and Coventry Bees mascot, and his wife Sharon were killed in a road accident in Yorkshire.

Boocock died on 3 April 2015, aged 77.

== World final appearances ==
=== Individual World Championship ===
- 1956 – (England) London, Wembley Stadium – Reserve, did not ride
- 1962 – (England) London, Wembley Stadium – Reserve, did not ride
- 1963 – (England) London, Wembley Stadium – 7th – 8pts
- 1964 – (Sweden) Gothenburg, Ullevi – 9th – 6pts
- 1965 – (England) London, Wembley Stadium – 8th – 8pts
- 1966 – (Sweden) Göteborg, Ullevi – 15th – 2pt
- 1968 – (Sweden) Göteborg, Ullevi – 16th – 1pt
- 1969 – (England) London, Wembley Stadium – 4th – 10pts
- 1971 – (Sweden) Göteborg, Ullevi – 9th – 6pts
- 1972 – (England) London, Wembley Stadium – 10th – 6pts

=== World Pairs Championship ===
- 1969*- (Sweden) Stockholm, Gubbängens IP (with Martin Ashby) – 3rd – 21pts (11)
- 1970 – (Sweden) Malmö, Malmö Stadion (with Eric Boocock) – 3rd – 19pts (6)

* Unofficial World Championships.

=== World Team Cup ===
- 1960*- (Sweden) Göteborg, Ullevi (with Peter Craven / Ron How / Ken McKinlay / George White) – 2nd – 30pts (1)
- 1964 – (West Germany) Abensberg, Abensberg Stadion (with Barry Briggs / Ron How / Ken McKinlay / Brian Brett) – 3rd – 21pts (3)
- 1965 – (West Germany) Kempten (with Barry Briggs / Charlie Monk / Ken McKinlay / Jimmy Gooch) – 3rd – 18pts (6)
- 1966 – (Poland) Wrocław, Olympic Stadium (with Barry Briggs / Terry Betts / Ivan Mauger / Colin Pratt) – 4th – 8pts (4)
- 1968 – (England) London, Wembley Stadium (with Ivan Mauger / Barry Briggs / Martin Ashby / Norman Hunter) – Winner – 40pts (10)
- 1969 – (Poland) Rybnik, Rybnik Municipal Stadium (with Martin Ashby / Ivan Mauger / Barry Briggs) – 2nd – 27pts (5)
- 1970 – (England) London, Wembley Stadium (with Ivan Mauger / Barry Briggs / Eric Boocock / Ray Wilson) – 2nd – 31pts (2)

* 1960 for England. All others for Great Britain.
