= Gunnar Malmqvist =

Swedish speedway rider

- Born: 25 December 1940 (age 85); Sweden
- Nationality: Swedish

Career history

Sweden
- 1961–1970, 1972–1976: Njudungarna

Great Britain
- 1967: Exeter Falcons

Individual honours
- 1968: Speedway World Championship finalist

Team honours
- 1976: Allsvenskan Champion
- 1966, 1975: Allsvenskan Div 2 Champion

Gunnar Malmqvist (born 25 December 1940) is a Swedish former motorcycle speedway rider. He earned 13 caps for the Sweden national speedway team.

== Speedway career ==
Malmqvist was a leading speedway rider in the late 1960s. He reached the final of the Speedway World Championship in the 1968 Individual Speedway World Championship. He won the Swedish Speedway Championship for pair racing together with Conny Samuelsson.

Malmqvist rode in the top tier of British Speedway during the 1967 British League season, riding for Exeter Falcons. The same year, he was selected for the Swedish side for their UK tour.

== World final appearances ==
=== Individual World Championship ===
- 1968 – (Sweden) Gothenburg, Ullevi – 10th – 7pts
