= Torbjörn Harrysson =

Swedish speedway rider

- Born: 14 July 1943; Visby, Sweden
- Died: 15 August 2010 (aged 67)
- Nationality: Swedish

Career history

Sweden
- 1965: Taxarna
- 1966-1969: Vargarna
- 1972: Bysarna

Great Britain
- 1967, 1968: Newport Wasps

Individual honours
- 1966, 1968, 1969: Speedway World Championship finalist
- 1969: Nordic Champion

Team honours
- 1967: World Team Cup Winner
- 1968: World Pairs Champion
- 1972: Allsvenskan Champion

Torbjörn Harrysson (1943-2010) was a Swedish motorcycle speedway rider. He earned 26 caps for the Sweden national speedway team.

== Speedway career ==
Harrysson was a leading speedway rider in the 1960s. He reached the final of the Speedway World Championship on three occasions; in the 1966 Individual Speedway World Championship, 1968 Individual Speedway World Championship and the 1969 Individual Speedway World Championship.

Harrysson won the silver medal in 1968 and bronze medal in 1967 at the Swedish Championship.

Harrysson helped Sweden win the World Team Cup in 1967 as well as the Speedway World Pairs Championship in 1968.

Harrysson rode in the top tier of British Speedway from 1967 until 1968, riding for Newport Wasps.

== World Final Appearances ==
=== Individual World Championship ===
- 1966 - (Sweden) Gothenburg, Ullevi - 5th - 10pts
- 1968 – (Sweden) Gothenburg, Ullevi – 6th – 10pts
- 1969 - (England) London, Wembley Stadium - 14th - 4pts

=== World Pairs Championship ===
- 1968* - (West Germany) Kempten (with Ove Fundin) - Winner - 24pts (10)

* Unofficial World Championships.

=== World Team Cup ===
- 1967 - (Sweden) Malmö, Malmö Stadion (with Ove Fundin / Göte Nordin / Bengt Jansson) - Winner - 32pts (6)
- 1968 - (England) London, Wembley Stadium (with Ove Fundin / Anders Michanek / Olle Nygren / Bengt Jansson) - 2nd - 30pts (2)
