= Martin Ashby =

English speedway rider (1944–2026)

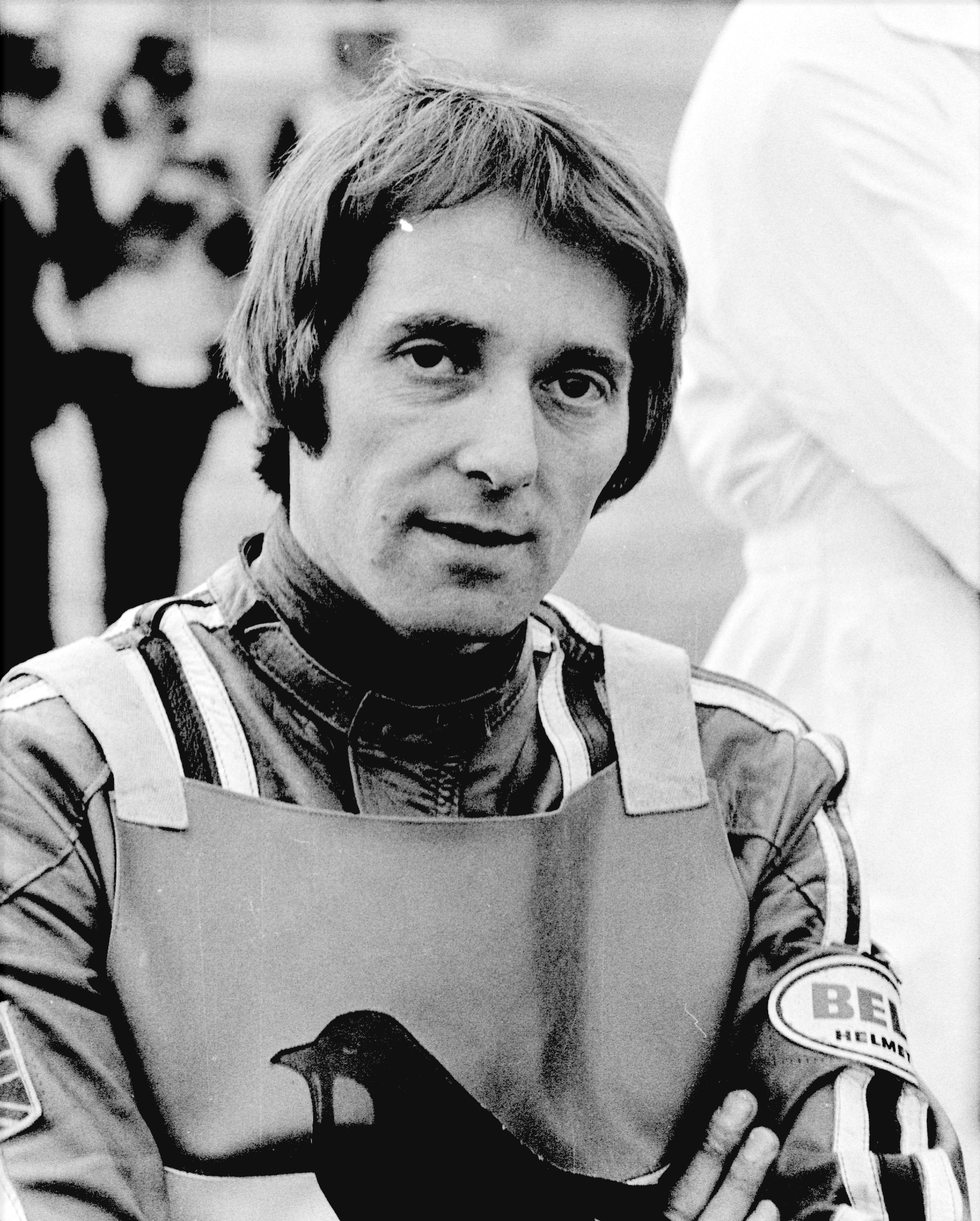
- Born: 5 February 1944; Marlborough, Wiltshire, England
- Died: 16 September 2026 (aged 82)
- Nationality: British (English)

Career history
- 1961-1967, 1971-1979: Swindon Robins
- 1968-1970: Exeter Falcons
- 1980: Reading Racers

Individual honours
- 1968: Scottish Open Champion
- 1966, 1974: Pride Of The Midlands Winner
- 1975: Superama
- 1976: The Laurels

Team honours
- 1968, 1975: World Team Cup Winner
- 1967, 1980: British League Champion
- 1967: Midland Cup

Henry Martin Ashby (5 February 1944 – 16 September 2026) was an English international motorcycle speedway rider, who reached the final of the Speedway World Championship in 1968. He also finished third in the Speedway World Pairs Championship in 1969, with Nigel Boocock and was a member of the Great Britain team that won the World Team Cups in 1968 and 1975.

== Career ==
Ashby began his career with the Swindon Robins in 1961 but was moved on to the Exeter Falcons in 1968 by the speedway rider control committee. Three years later, he returned to Swindon, and remained there for the rest of his career, apart from a short spell at Reading Racers in 1980 where he helped secure the title. Ashby was a regular England international. Ashby held the club record for most appearances (641) and points total (5,4765½) until 2008 when Leigh Adams overtook the points record.

He was a British Finalist on ten occasions (1967, 1968, 1969, 1970, 1971, 1972, 1973, 1974, 1975, 1977). He won the Speedway World Team Cup in 1968, with Great Britain and 1975, with England. He earned 49 England caps and 21 Great Britain caps.

Ashby's last season in the British leagues was a league winning season with the Reading Racers, during the 1980 British League season.

== Personal life and death ==
Henry Martin Ashby was born in Marlborough, England on 5 February 1944.

After retiring, Ashby ran a motorcycle workshop: repairs, and tuning etc. in his hometown.

Ashby died at home on 16 September 2026, aged 82.

His brother, David, was a teammate for several years at Swindon.

== World Final appearances ==
=== Individual World Championship ===
- 1968 – (Sweden) Gothenburg, Ullevi – 11th – 5pts
- 1975 – (England) London, Wembley Stadium – Reserve – did not ride

=== World Pairs Championship ===
- 1969* – (Sweden) Stockholm, Gubbängens IP (with Nigel Boocock) – 3rd – 21pts (10)

* Unofficial World Championships.

=== World Team Cup ===
- 1968* – (England) London, Wembley Stadium (with Ivan Mauger / Nigel Boocock / Barry Briggs / Norman Hunter) – Winner – 40pts (8)
- 1969* -– (Poland) Rybnik, Rybnik Municipal Stadium (with Nigel Boocock / Ivan Mauger / Barry Briggs) – 2nd – 27pts (5)
- 1975 – (West Germany) Norden, Motodrom Halbemond (with Malcolm Simmons / Peter Collins / John Louis) – Winner – 41pts (10)

* 1968 and 1969 for Great Britain. All others for England.
