= Colin Pratt =

English speedway rider (1938–2021)

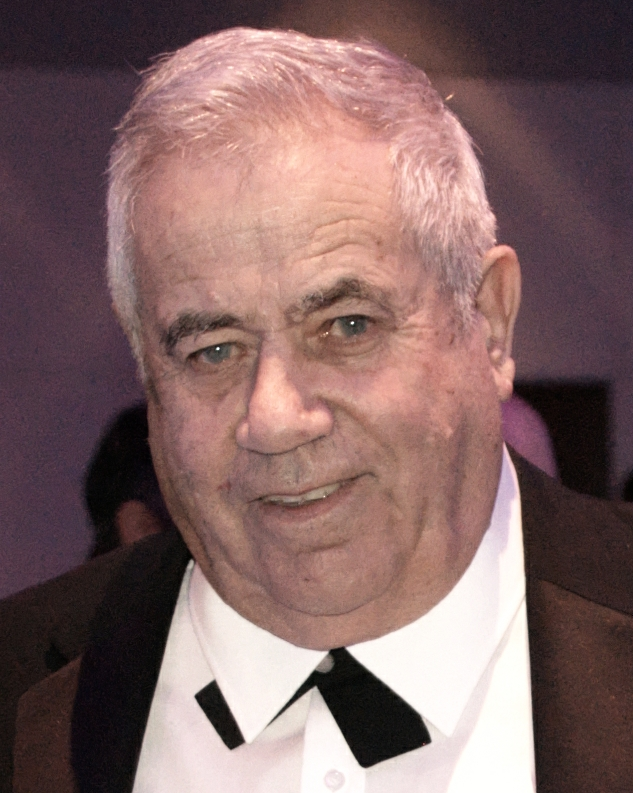
- Pratt in 2018
- Born: 10 October 1938; Hoddesdon, Hertfordshire, England
- Died: 2 October 2021 (aged 82)
- Nationality: British (English)

Career history
- 1957: Rye House Roosters
- 1959: Yarmouth Bloaters
- 1960: Southampton Saints
- 1961: Poole Pirates
- 1961–1963: Stoke Potters
- 1964: Swindon Robins
- 1964–1969: Hackney Hawks
- 1970: Cradley Heathens

Individual honours
- 1966: Pride of the East winner
- 1967, 1968: London Riders Champion
- 1969: Southern Riders Champion

Colin George Pratt (10 October 1938 – 2 October 2021) was a British motorcycle speedway rider and later promoter of the Coventry Bees who compete in the British Elite League. He earned 14 international caps for the England national speedway team and 7 caps for the Great Britain team. He was later the manager of the Great Britain national team from 1979 to 1980 and from 1986 to 1993.

== Racing career ==
Born in Hoddesdon, Hertfordshire, Pratt lived near to Mike Broadbank from whom he bought his first speedway bike at the age of 19, and practised at the nearby Rye House track. After his National Service, he returned to the Rye House training track in 1960 and had his first competitive rides, reaching the final of the Whitsun Trophy. He was signed by the Southampton Saints, where he made his National League debut against Oxford. A broken wrist sustained at Swindon brought his debut season to an early end. He had only second-half rides for Southampton in 1961, and was loaned to Poole Pirates for whom he rode in three matches, Ipswich Witches (two matches), and then Stoke Potters where he started to score well, with paid 15 points against Wolverhampton and a 12-point maximum against Cradley Heath.

In 1962, Pratt scored 177 points from 34 matches for the Potters, and improved further in 1963, scoring 141 points in his first 12 matches and winning all five races to win the Gerry Hussey Memorial Trophy at Rye House, breaking the track record during the meeting. He moved on to the Swindon Robins before joining the Hackney Hawks in 1964. He rode for the Hawks for six years until the 1970 season when he moved to the Cradley Heathens. However, he was forced to retire after he was involved in a road crash near Lokeren in Belgium. Five riders and officials died. Pratt was riding as a guest for the West Ham Hammers against a Danish select side in the Netherlands (in which he gained a five ride maximum). He sustained three broken bones in his neck and was warned by doctors that if he rode again and broke it he would be paralysed. After deciding the risk was too great, he retired.

Pratt was also a full England international and rode in two World Team Cup finals. He also qualified for the final of the Speedway World Championship in 1967. It was as a Hackney rider that he won the London Riders' Championship in 1967 and again in 1968.

== Promoter and team manager ==
Pratt became co-promoter at the Rye House Rockets with former boss Len Silver in 1979. In 1983, he spent a season as team manager at King's Lynn Stars before becoming promoter at Cradley Heath in 1984. He stayed at Cradley until 1996 where he became co-promoter of the ill-fated London Lions, based at the Hawks' previous stadium, Hackney Wick. By now, it had been redeveloped and renamed the London Stadium.

The promotion closed after one season so Pratt moved to the Bradford Dukes as team manager. In 1998, the opportunity arose to join the Coventry Bees as promoter and Pratt has been there ever since in promoter/co-promoter and team manager roles.

Pratt also had two spells as the Great Britain team manager from 1979 to 1980 and with Eric Boocock from 1986 to 1993). He has won sixteen major trophies as a manager or promoter. He has served several terms on the British Speedway Promoters' Association management committee.

== Personal life ==
Pratt died on 2 October 2021, at the age of 82 from cancer.

== World Final Appearances ==
=== Individual World Championship ===
- 1967 - (England) London, Wembley Stadium - 13th - 4pts

=== World Team Cup ===
- 1966 - (Poland) Wrocław, Olympic Stadium (with Barry Briggs / Terry Betts / Ivan Mauger / Nigel Boocock) - 4th - 8pts (0)
- 1967 - (Sweden) Malmö, Malmö Stadion (with Ray Wilson / Barry Briggs / Ivan Mauger / Eric Boocock) - 3rd= - 19pts (0)
