= James Bond (speedway rider) =

British former motorcycle speedway rider

- Born: 5 July 1938 (age 88); Sutton Coldfield, England
- Nationality: British (English)

Career history
- 1963-1971: Wolverhampton Wolves
- 1971-1972: Swindon Robins
- 1974: Long Eaton Archers

Team honours
- 1963: Provincial League Champions

John James Bond (born 5 July 1938) is a former motorcycle speedway rider from England, who rode for Wolverhampton Wolves, Swindon Robins, and Long Eaton Archers.

== Biography ==
Bond was born in Sutton Coldfield in 1938. He competed in cycle speedway for Sutton Coldfield Stars before taking up the motorized form. He undertook his national service in 1960, joining the Royal Corps of Signals and training as a despatch rider before joining the Royal Signals Motorcycle Display Team, performing around the UK and at Madison Square Gardens.

Bond first rode in speedway as a junior in 1961, moving into the Wolverhampton Wolves team in 1963, the year that the Wolves won the Provincial League. Nicknamed "007" in reference to his fictional namesake, he was a regular member of the Wolves team until 1971 when he moved to the Swindon Robins. After two seasons with the Robins, he spent a season with the Long Eaton Archers before retiring at the end of 1974.

Bond represented England against Australia in 1969. He won the first indoor speedway event to be staged in Leicester, the Midland Riders Championship at the Granby Halls in 1971.

== Career record ==
All figures relate to the British League.

Year	Team	Matches	Rides	Points	Bonus	Total	Average	Full Maximum	Paid Maximum
1965	Wolverhampton Wolves	20	80	47	20	67	3.35		
1966	Wolverhampton Wolves	31	112	125	28	153	5.46		
1967	Wolverhampton Wolves	27	92	106	22	128	5.57		
1968	Wolverhampton Wolves	37	159	237	34	271	6.82		1
1969	Wolverhampton Wolves	37	154	248	36	284	7.38		1
1970	Wolverhampton Wolves	37	143	161	29	190	5.32		
1971	Wolverhampton Wolves	3	11	7	2	9	3.27		
1971	Swindon Robins	17	49	33	9	42	3.43		
1972	Swindon Robins	13	36	24	8	32	3.56		
1974	Long Eaton Archers^{†}	21	69	57	13	70	4.06		1

^{†}Division two
