= Bengt Larsson (speedway rider) =

Swedish speedway rider

- Born: 25 December 1946; Mariestad, Sweden
- Nationality: Swedish

Career history

Sweden
- 1964–1978: Örnarna

Great Britain
- 1967–1971, 1973, 1976: Sheffield Tigers

Team honours
- 1973: Northern Trophy
- 1969, 1976: Allsvenskan Div 2 Champion

Bengt Larsson (born 25 December 1946) is a former motorcycle speedway rider from Sweden. He was capped 26 times by the Sweden national speedway team.

== Career ==
Larsson started racing in the British leagues during the 1967 British League season, when riding for the Sheffield Tigers, and he made an immediate impact by topping the team's averages in his first season in Britain. He would remain with Sheffield throughout his entire British career, with his last season being the 1976 British League season.

In his native Sweden, Larsson was also loyal to Örnarna in the Swedish Speedway Team Championship from 1964 until 1978.
