= Bo Josefsson =

Swedish speedway rider

- Born: 11 July 1940 (age 86); Forserum, Sweden
- Nationality: Swedish

Career history

Sweden
- 1962–1968: Njudungarna
- 1969–1976: Lejonen

Great Britain
- 1967–1968: Glasgow Tigers

Individual honours
- 1967: Swedish Championship silver

Team honours
- 1966: Allsvenskan Div 2 Champion
- 1974: Allsvenskan Div 2A Champion

Bo Josefsson (born 11 July 1940) is a former international motorcycle speedway rider from Sweden. He earned 13 caps for the Sweden national speedway team.

== Speedway career ==
Josefsson won the silver medal at the 1967 Swedish Championship. He rode in the top tier of British Speedway in 1967, riding for Glasgow Tigers but returned home in August. He did however ride another season for Glasgow in 1968.
