= Norman Hunter (speedway rider) =

British motorcycle speedway rider

- Born: 21 February 1940 (age 86); Willesden, London, England
- Nationality: British (English)

Career history
- 1962: Leicester Hunters
- 1963: Hackney Hawks
- 1964–68: West Ham Hammers
- 1969–1972: Wolverhampton Wolves
- 1972–1976: Swindon Robins

Individual honours
- 1963, 1966: London Riders' Championship
- 1969: Midland Riders' Championship

Team honours
- 1965: British League Champion
- 1965: British League KO Cup winner
- 1965, 1966, 1967: London Cup winner
- 1968: World Team Cup winner

Norman Frederick Hunter (born 21 February 1940 in Willesden, London) is a former motorcycle speedway rider who won the London Riders' Championship in 1963 and again in 1966 and the Midland Riders' Championship in 1969. He was also a member of the Great Britain national speedway team that won the World Team Cup in 1968.

== Biography ==
Hunter worked as an electrician and was a successful cycle speedway rider with Wembley before, winning scores of honours. After taking up motorcycle speedway in 1961 at the Rye House track, his first team place was with the Leicester Hunters in 1962, reaching the Provincial League Riders Final in his first season. He then joined the newly formed Hackney Hawks in 1963, captaining the team in their first season, and won the London Riders' Championship at the first attempt. He then moved on to the West Ham Hammers in 1964 and it was with them he won The London Riders' Championship again in 1966.

Hunter was also a part of the West Ham team that won the inaugural British League championship in 1965. He later rode with the Wolverhampton Wolves and for Swindon Robins.

Hunter represented England on ten occasions, and Great Britain on ten, all between 1965 and 1971, including the World Team Cup in 1968.

After retiring from racing, Hunter was appointed to a technical adviser role for Leicester Lions in 1981, taking over management of the team the following year.

== World final appearances ==
=== World Team Cup ===
- 1968 – (England) London, Wembley Stadium (with Ivan Mauger / Nigel Boocock / Martin Ashby / Barry Briggs) – Winner – 40pts (3)
