= Reg Luckhurst =

English international speedway rider

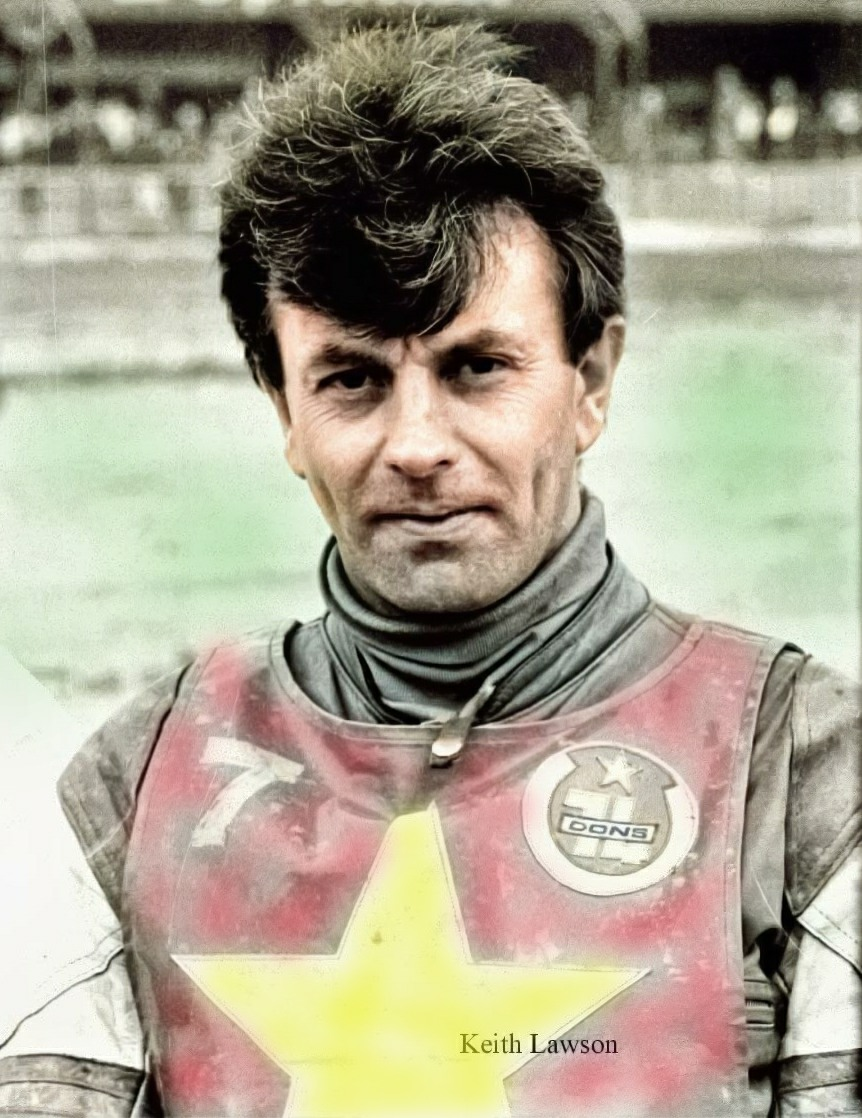
- Born: 11 November 1935 (age 91); Ashford, Kent, England
- Nationality: British (English)

Career history
- 1960: Edinburgh Monarchs
- 1960-1961: New Cross Rangers
- 1962-1963: Southampton Saints
- 1964, 1971: West Ham Hammers
- 1965-1970, 1973-1975: Wimbledon Dons
- 1976: Canterbury Crusaders

Individual honours
- 1965: Speedway World Championship finalist

Team honours
- 1962: National League Champion
- 1968, 1969, 1970: British League KO Cup winner
- 1968, 1969, 1970, 1974: London Cup Winner

Reginald Thomas Luckhurst (born 11 November 1935) is a former international motorcycle speedway rider from England. He earned four international caps for the England national speedway team and seven caps for the Great Britain team.

== Speedway career ==
Luckhurst reached the final of the Speedway World Championship in the 1965 Individual Speedway World Championship.

Luckhurst rode in the top tier of British Speedway from 1959 to 1976, riding for various clubs. He was capped by England four times and Great Britain seven times.

== World final appearances ==
=== Individual World Championship ===
- 1965 – (England) London, Wembley Stadium – 12th – 4pts

== Music ==
Luckhurst recorded a couple of singles in the early 1970s. They were "Your Cheatin' Heart" bw "Was it Rain" for the Decca label and "In the Misty Moonlight" bw "Home" for the Crystal label.
