= Trevor Hedge =

British motorcycle speedway rider

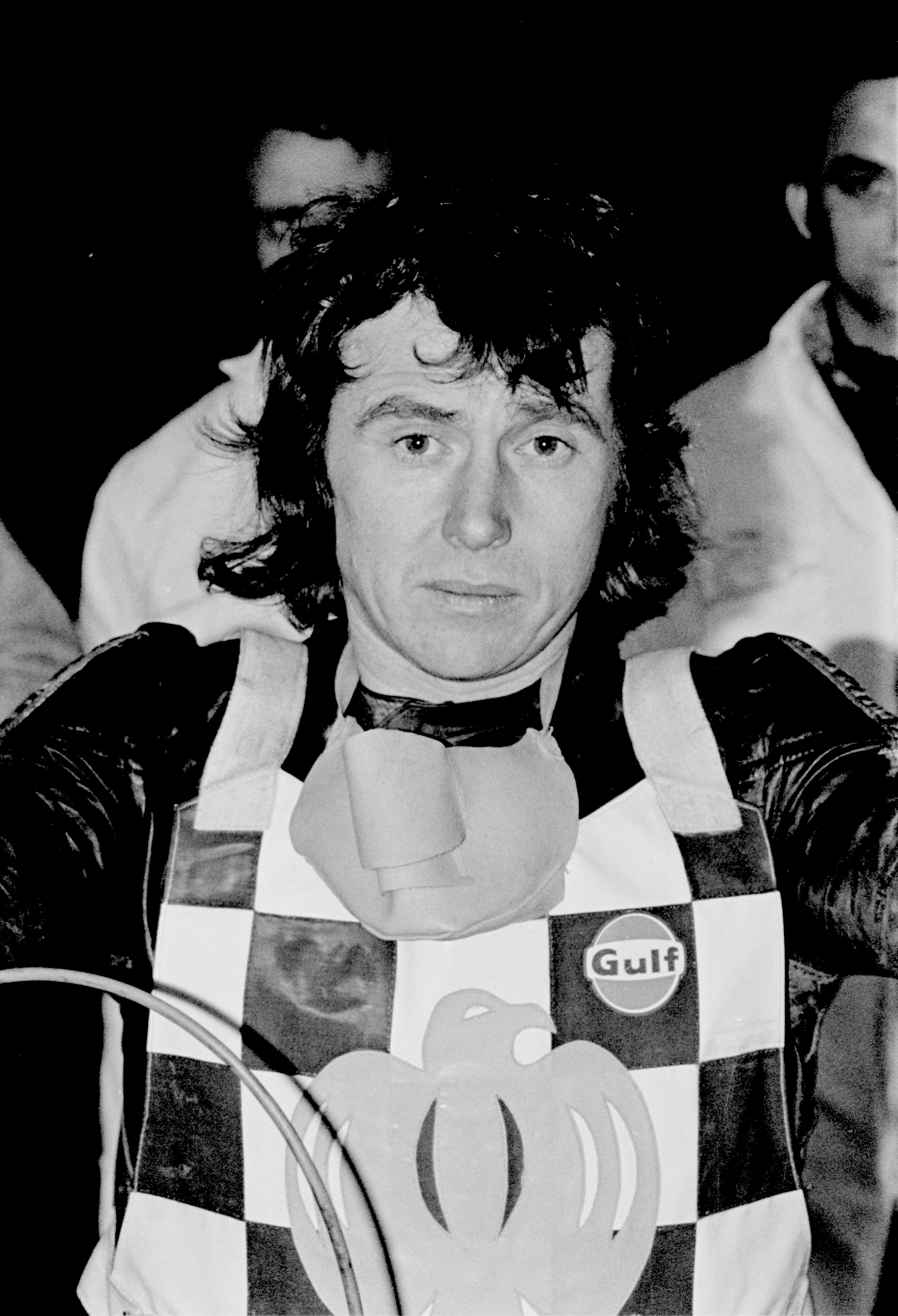
- Born: 3 August 1943 (age 83); Diss, England
- Nationality: British (English)

Career history
- 1961–1964: Norwich Stars
- 1962: Leicester Hunters
- 1963, 1976–1977: Hackney Hawks
- 1963: Oxford Cheetahs
- 1965–1974: Wimbledon Dons
- 1975: King's Lynn Stars

Individual honours
- 1969: Internationale
- 1969, 1970: London Riders' Champion

Team honours
- 1968, 1969, 1970: British League KO Cup Winner
- 1968, 1969, 1970, 1974: London Cup Winner

Trevor John Hedge (born 3 August 1943) is an English former motorcycle speedway rider.

== Career ==
Hedge was born on 3 August 1943 in Diss, Norfolk, England. Before taking up speedway, Hedge was a cycle speedway champion.

Hedge began his British leagues career riding a few times for Norwich Stars during the 1961 Speedway National League season. The following season, he doubled up with Norwich and Leicester Hunters, the latter in the Provincial league. He began to improve his average in 1963 while at Hackney and was averaging 8.00 with Norwich during the 1963 Speedway National League season.

After another strong season with Norwich, Hedge was allocated to the Wimbledon Dons, on the creation of the new British League in 1965. It was at Wimbledon that he experienced the best years of his career, winning the London Riders' Championship twice in succession in 1969 and 1970 and the Internationale in 1969. In addition to the individual success, he won the British League Knockout Cup three times and the London Cup four times.

Hedge reached the final of the Speedway World Championship in 1970.

At retirement, Hedge had earned 16 international caps for the England national speedway team and 17 caps for Great Britain.

== World Final Appearances ==
- 1970 – (Poland) Wrocław, Olympic Stadium - 16th - 0pts
