= 1971 Speedway World Team Cup =

12th edition of the annual motorcycle speedway World Cup competition

Seasons
- ← 1970 1972 →

The 1971 Speedway World Team Cup was the 12th edition of the FIM Speedway World Team Cup to determine the team world champions.

The final took place at Stadion Olimpijski (Wrocław) in Poland. The title was won by Great Britain for the second time.

== Qualifying ==
=== British round ===
- Great Britain (including Commonwealth riders) seeded to World Final.

=== Scandinavian round ===
- 20 June
- (Denmark) Fredericia Speedway Stadium, Fredericia

Pos.	National team	Pts.	Riders
1	Sweden	41	Anders Michanek 11; Bernt Persson 11; Bengt Jansson 10; Sören Sjösten 7 Leif Enecrona 2
2	Denmark	33	Ole Olsen 12; Neils Weiss 8 Bent Nørregaard-Jensen 7 Kurt Bøgh 6 Jorn Mogensen 0
3	Norway	21	Reidar Eide 6 Ulf Lovaas 6 Odd Fossengen 5 Oyvind S. Berg 3 Svein Kaasa 1
4	Finland	1	Matti Olin 1 Erkki Hannula 0 Reima Lohkovuori 0 Jouko Naskali 0 Tapio Leppasalko 0

=== Continental round ===
==== Quarter-Final ====
- 13 June
- (Socialist Federal Republic of Yugoslavia) Kovinar Stadium, Maribor

Pos.	National team	Pts.	Riders
1	Soviet Union	46	Viktor Trofimov 9 Gennady Kurilenko 9 Anatoly Kuzmin 9 Aleksandr Pavlov 9 Grigori Khlinovsky 8
2	Yugoslavia	23	Vlado Kocuvan 7 Ivan Molan 6 Drasko Orsic 6 Vlado Miler 4
3	Bulgaria	15	Nedelko Nedelkov 6 Peter Iliev 4 Alexander Kostov 4 Alexej Antonov 1
4	Italy	12	Annibale Pretto 9 Gianni Pizzo 1 Giuseppe Pizzo 1 Franco Rupil 1

==== Quarter-final ====
- 13 June
- (West Germany) Rodenbach Motodrom, Rodenbach

Pos.	National team	Pts.	Riders
1	East Germany	40	Peter Liebing 11; Hans Jürgen Fritz 11; Dieter Tetzlaff 10; Jochen Dinse 0
2	West Germany	36	Manfred Poschenreider 12; Rudolf Kastl 9 Josef Angermüller 8 Jan Käter 7
3	Austria	11	Josef Haider 5 Heinz Zimmermann 4 Gunther Walla 1 Herbert Prosi 1 Alex Taudtmann 0
4	Hungary	9	Pal Perenyi 3 Barnabas Gyepes 3 Sandor Csatho 2 Ferenc Radacsi 1 Janos Szoeke 0

==== Semi-Final ====
- 4 July
- (West Germany) Illerstadion, Kempten

Pos.	National team	Pts.	Riders
1	Soviet Union	36	Vladimir Gordeev 12; Grigori Khlinovsky 12; Aleksandr Pavlov 7 Gennady Kurilenko 5 Viktor Trofimov 0
2	East Germany	30	Dieter Tetzlaff 10; Hans Jürgen Fritz 9 Peter Liebing 8 Jochen Dinse 2 Horst Krüger 1
3	West Germany	25	Manfred Poschenreider 9 Jan Käter 7 Josef Angermüller 5 Dieter Dauderer 4
4	Yugoslavia	5	Ivan Molan 3 Vlado Miler 1 Drasko Orsic 0 Vlado Kocuvan 0

==== Final ====
- 25 August
- (Soviet Union) Leningrad Speedway Stadium, Leningrad

Pos.	National team	Pts.	Riders
1	Soviet Union	46	Vladimir Gordeev 12; Vladimir Smirnov 11; Georgi Ivanov 11; Gennady Kurilenko 11
2	Poland	30	Edward Jancarz 9 Henryk Glücklich 9 Andrzej Wyglenda 8 Jerzy Szczakiel 4
3	Czechoslovakia	10.5	Pavel Mareš 3.5; Miloslav Verner 3 Jiří Štancl 2 Jan Holub I 2 Václav Verner 0
4	East Germany	9.5	Dieter Tetzlaff 5 Peter Liebing 2 Hans-Jürgen Fritz 1.5; Horst Krüger 1 Jochen Dinse 0

== World final ==
- 26 September
- (Poland) Olympic Stadium

Pos.	National team	Pts.	Riders
1st	Great Britain	37	Ray Wilson - 12; Ivan Mauger - 10; Jim Airey - 9 Barry Briggs - 6 Ronnie Moore - dnr
2nd	Soviet Union	22	Grigory Khlinovsky - 8 Vladimir Smirnov - 7 Vladimir Gordeev - 4 Anatoly Kuzmin - 3 Viktor Trofimov - dnr
3rd	Poland	19	Paweł Waloszek - 5 Henryk Glücklich - 4 Antoni Woryna - 4 Edward Jancarz - 4 Andrzej Wyglenda - 2
4th	Sweden	18	Anders Michanek - 9 Sören Sjösten - 3 Bengt Jansson 3 Leif Enecrona 3 Bernt Persson 0

== See also ==
- 1971 Individual Speedway World Championship
- 1971 Speedway World Pairs Championship
