= 1970 Individual Speedway World Championship =

Motorcycle speedway world championship season

Seasons
- ← 1969 1971 →

The 1970 Individual Speedway World Championship was the 25th edition of the official World Championship to determine the world champion rider.

Ivan Mauger became the first rider to win the title in three consecutive years, his five ride 15 point maximum took him to third in the all-time list behind Ove Fundin and Barry Briggs. The Poles Paweł Waloszek and Antoni Woryna took silver and bronze respectively in their home nation at the Olympic Stadium.

== Format changes ==
The format of the Championship changed again for the 1970 event. This time the Polish riders were allowed six places in the World Final to be held in Poland. All other nations had to go through the European Final route to provide the remaining 10 riders for the World Final.

== First round ==
Qualification results.

=== Swedish qualifying ===
- Top 8 in each heat to Swedish semi-finals

26 April, Gamla Motorstadion, Målilla
Pos	Rider	Points
1	Bengt Jansson	15
2	Conny Samuelsson	12
3	Therje Henriksson	11
4	Tommy Johansson	10
5	Lennart Michanek	10
6	Åke Andersson	10
7	Bengt Brannefors	9
8	Bengt Svensson	8
9	Hasse Holmqvist	7
10	Per-Åke Gerhardsson	6
11	Inge Gustafsson	5
12	Lars-Åke Andersson	5
13	Anders Jansson	3
14	Yngve Nilsson	3
15	Kenneth Selmosson	3
16	Börje Olsson	1

1 May, Gamla Speedway Track, Visby
Pos	Rider	Points
1	Leif Enecrona	14
2	Göte Nordin	14
3	Olle Nygren	13
4	Christer Löfqvist	12
5	Lars Jansson	10
6	Tommy Bergqvist	9
7	Bo Magnusson	9
8	Rolf Johansson	7
9	Hans Hallberg	6
10	Dirk van der Voet	6
11	Benny Lundström	5
12	Håkan Karlsson	4
13	Torbjörn Karlsson	3
14	Börje Melin	3
15	Sune Stark	3
16	Roger Gullbrandsgård	2

3 May, Vetlanda Motorstadion, Vetlanda
Pos	Rider	Points
1	Anders Michanek	15
2	Bo Josefsson	14
3	Sven-Inge Svensson	12
4	Sven Sigurd	10
5	Bengt Larsson	10
6	Bengt Andersson	9
7	Karl-Erik Claesson	9
8	Leif Johansson	8
9	Gunnar Malmqvist	8
10	Sigvard Johansson	7
11	Egon Stengarn	5
12	Per Sjöholm	3
13	Nils Ringström	3
14	Curt Nyqvist	3
15	Sonny Widergren	2
16	Torbjörn Runesson	1
17	Lars-Göran Däldebring	0

22 May, Ryd Motorstadion, Linköping
Pos	Rider	Points
1	Sören Sjösten	15
2	Bernt Persson	14
3	Ove Fundin	13
4	Per-Olof Söderman	12
5	Jan Simensen	10
6	Hans Johansson	9
7	Runo Wedin	9
8	Käll Haage	8
9	Göran Jansson	8
10	Anders Jansson	8
11	Leif Söderberg	5
12	Lars Jennefors	4
13	Lars Åhnström	1
14	Benny Ekberg	1
15	Olle Åhnström	0

=== British/Commonwealth qualifying ===
- Top 32 to British semi-finals

Date	Venue	Winner	2nd	3rd
25 April	Brandon Stadium, Coventry	Nigel Boocock	Bruce Cribb	Peter Vandenberg
25 April	King's Lynn Stadium, King's Lynn	Ronnie Moore	Wayne Briggs	Terry Betts
25 April	Hyde Road, Manchester	Chris Pusey	Tommy Roper	Cyril Maidment
27 April	Brough Park, Newcastle	Barry Briggs	Jim Airey	Rick Timmo
27 April	County Ground Stadium, Exeter	Ivan Mauger	Bob Kilby	Martin Ashby
28 April	West Ham Stadium, London	Ivan Mauger	Bob Kilby	Charlie Monk
28 April	Leicester Stadium, Leicester	Ray Wilson	John Boulger	Graham Plant
29 April	Wimborne Road, Poole	Trevor Hedge	Pete Smith	Gordon Guasco
30 April	Wimbledon Stadium, London	Eric Boocock	Ronnie Moore	Trevor Hedge
30 April	Owlerton Stadium, Sheffield	Jim Airey	Les Sharpe	Nigel Boocock
30 April	Oxford Stadium, Oxford	Jim McMillan	John Boulger	Tony Clarke
1 May	Monmore Green, Wolverhampton	Nigel Boocock	Martin Ashby	Norman Hunter
1 May	Hackney Wick Stadium, London	Barry Briggs	Ronnie Moore	Jimmy Gooch
1 May	Hampden Park, Glasgow	Charlie Monk	Colin McKee	Jim McMillan
1 May	Somerton Park, Newport	Bill Andrew	Norman Strachan	Jim Airey
2 May	Abbey Stadium, Swindon	Barry Briggs	Bob Kilby	Ray Wilson
2 May	The Shay, Halifax	Arnold Haley	Les Sharpe	Eric Boocock
2 May	Dudley Wood Stadium, Dudley	Colin Pratt	Bob Andrews	Jack Biggs
13 May	Brandon Stadium, Coventry	Nigel Boocock	Ken McKinlay	Rick France

== Second round ==
=== Norwegian qualifying ===
- 15 October 1969
- (Norway) Krohnsminde Stadion, Bergen
- Top 2 (+2 seeded) to Nordic final 1970

Pos.	Rider	Points
1	Reidar Eide	15
2	Oyvind S. Berg	14
3	Edgar Stangeland	12
4	Per Aulie	12
5	Dag Lövaas	11
6	Einar Egedius	8
7	Nils Otto Haraldsen	7
8	Jon Hovind	7
9	Hans Olav Schia	6
10	Kjell Ttomas Skjäveland	5

=== Finnish qualifying (top 7) ===
- (2 rounds) 1 Aug & ?? 1969
- (Finland) Eteläpuisto, Tampere & Kärpänen Speedway, Lahti
- First to Nordic final 1970

Pos.	Rider	Points	Total
1	Kalevi Lahtinen	8+8	16
2	Matti Olin	6+6	12
3	Timo Laine	4+1	5
4	Jorma Taipale	0+4	4
5	Olavi Turunen	1+3	4
6	Reima Lohkovuori	2+2	4
7	Jouko Naskali	3+0	3

=== Swedish semi-finals ===
- 25 May, Ryavallen, Borås
- Top 4 to Nordic final

Pos.	Rider	Points
1	Sören Sjösten	14
2	Anders Michanek	14
3	Olle Nygren	14
4	Bengt Larsson	12
5	Per-Olof Söderman	10
6	Käll Haage	10
7	Lars Jansson	10
8	Leif Enecrona	9
9	Conny Samuelsson	9
10	Sven-Inge Svensson	5
11	Karl-Erik Claesson	5
12	Rolf Johansson	4
13	Sigvard Johansson	4
14	Hans Johansson	3
15	Åke Andersson	1
16	Bo Magnusson	0
17	Egon Stengarn (res)	0

- 28 May, Ullevi, Gothenburg
- Top 4 to Nordic final

Pos.	Rider	Points
1	Ove Fundin	14
2	Göte Nordin	14
3	Bengt Brannefors	13
4	Bengt Jansson	12
5	Bo Josefsson	10
6	Therje Henriksson	9
7	Bernt Persson	9
8	Jan Simensen	9
9	Bengt Svensson	6
10	Christer Löfqvist	6
11	Tommy Bergqvist	5
12	Runo Wedin	5
13	Sven Sigurd	3
14	Tommy Johansson	3
15	Per-Åke Gerhardsson (res)	2
16	Lennart Michanek	1
17	Bengt Andersson	1

=== Continental qualifying ===
- Top 32 to Continental semi-finals

Date	Venue	Winner	2nd	3rd
9 May	(East Germany) Meissen Speedway Stadium, Meissen	(Czechoslovakia) Jan Holub I	(Soviet Union) Valery Gordeev	(East Germany) Peter Liebing
10 May	(Hungary) Borsod Volán Stadion, Miskolc	(Czechoslovakia) Václav Verner	(Czechoslovakia) Jaroslav Volf	(Soviet Union) Viktor Trofimov
10 May	(Austria) Liebenauer Stadium, Graz	(Soviet Union) Vladimir Gordeev	(Czechoslovakia) Zdenek Majstr	(East Germany) Jochen Dinse
10 May	(Socialist Federal Republic of Yugoslavia) Igralište na Kajzerici, Zagreb	(Czechoslovakia) Pavel Mares	(Soviet Union) Boris Cehanovich	(East Germany) Jürgen Hehlert

=== British/Commonwealth semi-finals ===
- 19 May
- (England) Leicester Stadium, Leicester
- Top 8 to British/Commonwealth final

Pos.	Rider	Points
1	(New Zealand) Ivan Mauger	15
2	(New Zealand) Ronnie Moore	14
3	(Wales) Howard Cole	12
4	(England) Nigel Boocock	10
5	(England) Trevor Hedge	10
6	(England) Terry Betts	10
7	(Australia) Jim Airey	9
8	(England) Arnie Haley	9
9	(England) Bob Kilby	8
10	(England) Reg Luckhurst	5
11	(Scotland) George Hunter	4
12	(New Zealand) Bill Andrew (res)	4
13	(New Zealand) Wayne Briggs	3
14	(England) Cyril Maidment	2
15	(England) John Dews	2
16	(New Zealand) Rick Timmo	2
17	(Australia) Jack Biggs	1
18	(Australia) Gordon Guasco	2

- 21 May
- (England) Owlerton Stadium, Sheffield
- Top 8 to British Commonwealth final

Pos.	Rider	Points
1	(New Zealand) Barry Briggs	13
2	(Scotland) Jim McMillan	11
3	(England) Ray Wilson	11
4	(England) Roy Trigg	10
5	(Australia) Charlie Monk	10
6	(England) Chris Pusey	10
7	(Australia) John Boulger	9
8	(England) Martin Ashby	9
9	(England) Bob Andrews	8
10	(England) Tommy Roper	8
11	(Australia) Les Sharpe	7
12	(Scotland) Ken McKinlay	4
13	(England) Eric Boocock	3
14	(England) Tony Clarke	3
15	(England) Colin MCKee	2
16	(England) Colin Pratt	2

== Third round ==
=== Continental semi-finals ===
- 6 June
- (Czechoslovakia) Svítkov Stadium, Pardubice
- Top 8 to Continental final

Pos.	Rider	Points
1	(Soviet Union) Valerij Klementiev	15
2	(Soviet Union) Vladimir Smirnov	11
3	(Soviet Union) Yury Dubinin	10
4	(Soviet Union) Viktor Trofimov	10
5	(Czechoslovakia) Jiří Štancl	10
6	(East Germany) Hans Jürgen Fritz	9
7	(Soviet Union) Nikołaj Aksenov	9
8	(Soviet Union) Grigory Khlinovsky	9
9	(Czechoslovakia) Antonín Šváb Sr.	8
10	(Czechoslovakia) Václav Verner	8
11	(Czechoslovakia) Jaroslav Volf	5
12	(Soviet Union) Viktor Pavlov	5
13	(Czechoslovakia) Jan Holub I	5
14	(East Germany) Hans Martens	2
15	(East Germany) Peter Liebing	1
16	(Hungary) Pal Perenyi	0

- 7 June
- (Poland) Polonia Bydgoszcz Stadium, Bydgoszcz
- Top 8 to Continental final

Pos.	Rider	Points
1	(Soviet Union) Gennadij Kurilenko	14
2	(Soviet Union) Valerij Gordeev	12
3	(Soviet Union) Vladimir Kononovich	11
4	(Soviet Union) Viktor Kalmykov	11
5	(Czechoslovakia) Zdeněk Majstr	10
6	(East Germany) Jürgen Hehlert	10
7	(East Germany) Dieter Tetzlaff	10
8	(Soviet Union) Boris Cehanovich	9
9	(Soviet Union) Gabdrakhman Kadyrov	7
10	(East Germany) Gerhard Uhlenbrock	6
11	(Austria) Josef Bössner	5
12	(East Germany) Jochen Dinse	4
13	(Czechoslovakia) Miloslav Verner	4
14	(Soviet Union) Jurij Lambotskij	1
15	(Czechoslovakia) Pavel Mareš	dns
16	(Czechoslovakia) Frantisek Ledecky	dns

=== British/Commonwealth Final ===
- 9 June 1970
- (England) West Ham Stadium, London
- First 8 to British-Nordic Final

Placing	Rider	Total	1	2	3	4	5	6	7	8	9	10	11	12	13	14	15	16	17	18	19	20	Pts	Pos
1	(New Zealand) (13) Ivan Mauger	14				2	3							3		3					3		14	1
2	(New Zealand) (4) Ronnie Moore	13	3							3				2				2				3	13	2
3	(New Zealand) (3) Roy Trigg	12+3	1						3				3				3				2		12	3
4	(England) (2) Arnold Haley	12+2	2					3				3				2				2			12	4
5	(New Zealand) (6) Barry Briggs	10		3				0			3							3			1		10	5
6	(England) (16) Trevor Hedge	9				3				1	2						2			1			9	6
7	(Australia) (7) Jim Airey	8		0					1					1	3					3			8	7
8	(Australia) (14) John Boulger	8				1		2					1		2							2	8	8
9	(England) (11) Nigel Boocock	7			3				2		0					1						1	7	9
10	(England) (12) Chris Pusey	6			2					2		2			0						0		6	10
11	(Australia) (1) Charlie Monk	5	0				2				1				1				1				5	11
12	(England) (8) Martin Ashby	5		1						0			2			0			2				5	12
13	(England) (10) Ray Wilson	5			0			1						0			1		3				5	13
14	(Wales) (5) Howard Cole	2		2			0					0					0					0	2	14
15	(England) (9) Terry Betts	2			1		1						0					0		X			2	15
16	(Scotland) (15) Jim McMillan	2				0			0			1						1	0				2	16
	(England) (17) Bob Kilby	0																					0	
	(England) (18) Tommy Roper	0																					0	
Placing	Rider	Total	1	2	3	4	5	6	7	8	9	10	11	12	13	14	15	16	17	18	19	20	Pts	Pos

m - exclusion for exceeding two minute time allowance • t - exclusion for touching the tapes • x - other exclusion • e - retired or mechanical failure • f - fell • ns - non-starter • nc - non-classify

gate A - inside	gate B	gate C	gate D - outside

=== Nordic Final ===
- 4 June 1970
- (Sweden) Snälltorpet, Eskilstuna
- First 8 to British-Nordic Final

Placing	Rider	Total	1	2	3	4	5	6	7	8	9	10	11	12	13	14	15	16	17	18	19	20	Pts	Pos	21
1	(Sweden) (7) Göte Nordin	15		3					3					3	3					3			15	1	
2	(Sweden) (2) Sören Sjösten	12	3					3				3				1				2			12	2	
3	(Sweden) (12) Anders Michanek	11			3					1		2			2						3		11	3	
4	(Sweden) (13) Bengt Larsson	10				1	3							2		3					1		10	4	
5	(Norway) (3) Reidar Eide	10	2						2				3				1				2		10	5	
6	(Sweden) (5) Ove Fundin	9		2			E					1					3					3	9	6	
7	(Denmark) (16) Ole Olsen	9				3				T	3						2			1			9	7	
8	(Sweden) (11) Bengt Jansson	9			2				1		2					2						2	9	8	
9	(Norway) (8) Øyvind Berg	8		1						2			2			0			3				8	9	
10	(Norway) (4) Odd Fossengen	7	1							3				1				1				1	7	10	
11	(Sweden) (6) Bengt Brannefors	6		0				2			1							3			0		6	11	
12	(Denmark) (15) Bent Nørregaard-Jensen	6				2			0			0						2	2				6	12	
13	(Denmark) (1) Niels Weis Sorensen	3	F				2				0				1				0				3	13	
14	(Norway) (9) Dag Lovaas	3			1		1						1					0		0			3	14	
15	(Sweden) (14) Olle Nygren	1				0		1					0		0							0	1	15	
16	(Finland) (10) Matti Olin	1			0			0						0			0		1				1	16	
Placing	Rider	Total	1	2	3	4	5	6	7	8	9	10	11	12	13	14	15	16	17	18	19	20	Pts	Pos	21

m - exclusion for exceeding two minute time allowance • t - exclusion for touching the tapes • x - other exclusion • e - retired or mechanical failure • f - fell • ns - non-starter • nc - non-classify

gate A - inside	gate B	gate C	gate D - outside

== Fourth round ==
=== British Nordic Final ===
- 1 July 1970
- (England) Brandon Stadium, Coventry
- First 8 to European Final

Placing	Rider	Total	1	2	3	4	5	6	7	8	9	10	11	12	13	14	15	16	17	18	19	20	Pts	Pos
1	(Sweden) (2) Sören Sjösten	14	3					3				2				3				3			14	1
2	(Denmark) (13) Ole Olsen	13				2	3							3		2					3		13	2
3	(New Zealand) (14) Barry Briggs	12				3		2					1		3							3	12	3
4	(New Zealand) (11) Ronnie Moore	11			3				3		3					0						2	11	4
5	(New Zealand) (3) Ivan Mauger	10	0						2				3				3				2		10	5
6	(Australia) (5) Jim Airey	10		3			1					3					2					1	10	6
7	(Sweden) (1) Bengt Jansson	10	2				2				2				1				3				10	7
8	(Sweden) (4) Anders Michanek	9	1							3				2				3				0	9	8
9	(Sweden) (9) Ove Fundin	7			1		0						2					2		2			7	9
10	(England) (7) Trevor Hedge	6		1					1					1	2					1			6	10
11	(Australia) (12) John Boulger	4			2					0		1			0						1		4	11
12	(England) (16) Arnold Haley	4				0				2	1						1			0			4	12
13	(Sweden) (8) Göte Nordin	4		2						1			0			1			E				4	13
14	(Norway) (10) Reidar Eide	3			F			1						0			0		2				3	14
15	(England) (15) Roy Trigg	2				1			0			0						0	1				2	15
16	(Sweden) (6) Bengt Larsson	1		0				0			0							1			0		1	16
R1	(England) (R1) Nigel Boocock	0																					0	R1
R2	(Norway) (R2) Øyvind Berg	0																					0	R2
Placing	Rider	Total	1	2	3	4	5	6	7	8	9	10	11	12	13	14	15	16	17	18	19	20	Pts	Pos

m - exclusion for exceeding two minute time allowance • t - exclusion for touching the tapes • x - other exclusion • e - retired or mechanical failure • f - fell • ns - non-starter • nc - non-classify

gate A - inside	gate B	gate C	gate D - outside

=== Continental Final ===
- 2 June 1970
- (West Germany) Abensberger Stadion, Abensberg
- First 8 to European Final

Placing	Rider	Total	1	2	3	4	5	6	7	8	9	10	11	12	13	14	15	16	17	18	19	20	Pts	Pos
1	(East Germany) (9) Hans Jürgen Fritz	10			2		3						3					2					10	1
2	(Soviet Union) (10) Valeri Klementiev	9			3			2						1			3						9	2
3	(Czechoslovakia) (7) Zdenek Majstr	8		2					3					3	0								8	3
4	(Soviet Union) (15) Yury Dubinin	8				3			0			2						3					8	4
5	(Soviet Union) (1) Gennady Kurilenko	8	2				1				3				2								8	5
6	(Soviet Union) (2) Vladimir Kononovich	7	3					1				0				3							7	6
7	(Soviet Union) (12) Vladimir Gordeev	6			0					0		3			3								6	7
8	(Soviet Union) (16) Viktor Kalmykov	6				0				3	1						2						6	8
9	(Czechoslovakia) (5) Jiri Stancl	6		3			2					1					0						6	9
10	(Soviet Union) (11) Grigory Khlinovsky	6			1				2		2					1							6	10
11	(East Germany) (14) Dieter Tetzlaff	6				2		3					0		1								6	11
12	(East Germany) (8) Jürgen Hehlert	5		0						1			2			2							5	12
13	(Soviet Union) (13) Boris Cehanovich	4				1	0							2		1							4	13
14	(Soviet Union) (6) Nikolay Aksenov	1		1				0			0							0					1	14
15	(Soviet Union) (4) Nikolay Smirnov	0	F							-				-				-					0	15
16	(Soviet Union) (3) Viktor Trofimov	0	F						-				-				-						0	16
R1	(Czechoslovakia) (R1) Antonín Šváb Sr.	4	1						1				1				1						4	R1
R2	(Soviet Union) (R2) Gabdrakhman Kadyrov	3	0							2				0				1					3	R2
Placing	Rider	Total	1	2	3	4	5	6	7	8	9	10	11	12	13	14	15	16	17	18	19	20	Pts	Pos

m - exclusion for exceeding two minute time allowance • t - exclusion for touching the tapes • x - other exclusion • e - retired or mechanical failure • f - fell • ns - non-starter • nc - non-classify

gate A - inside	gate B	gate C	gate D - outside

== Fifth round ==
=== European Final ===
- 20 July 1970
- (Soviet Union) Leningrad Speedway Stadium, Leningrad
- First 10 to World Final

Placing	Rider	Total	1	2	3	4	5	6	7	8	9	10	11	12	13	14	15	16	17	18	19	20	Pts	Pos
1	(New Zealand) (4) Ivan Mauger	14	2							3				3				3				3	14	1
2	(Soviet Union) (1) Vladimir Gordeev	11	3				0				3				2				3				11	2
3	(Soviet Union) (10) Gennady Kurilenko	11			1			3						2			3		2				11	3
4	(Sweden) (12) Sören Sjösten	11			2					2		3			3						1		11	4
5	(Denmark) (5) Ole Olsen	11		2			3					2					2					2	11	5
6	(New Zealand) (11) Barry Briggs	10			3				3		1					3						0	10	6
7	(Sweden) (3) Anders Michanek	9	0						2				3				1				3		9	7
8	(Soviet Union) (2) Valeri Klementiev	8	1					2				1				1				3			8	8
9	(England) (15) Trevor Hedge	6				3			0			0						2	1				6	9
10	(Soviet Union) (13) Yury Dubinin	6				2	2							0		2					0		6	10
11	(New Zealand) (7) Ronnie Moore	5		3					1					1	F					-			5	11
12	(East Germany) (6) Hans Jürgen Fritz	5		0				1			2							0			2		5	12
13	(Soviet Union) (14) Vladimir Kononovich	5				1		0					2		1							1	5	13
14	(Soviet Union) (9) Viktor Kalmykov	5			0		1						1					1		2			5	14
15	(Australia) (8) Jim Airey	2		1						1			0			0			0				2	15
16	(Czechoslovakia) (16) Zdenek Majstr	1				0				0	0						0			1			1	16
R1	(Sweden) (R1) Bengt Jansson	0																					0	R1
R2	(Soviet Union) (R2) Yury Lombockiy	0																		0			0	R2
Placing	Rider	Total	1	2	3	4	5	6	7	8	9	10	11	12	13	14	15	16	17	18	19	20	Pts	Pos

m - exclusion for exceeding two minute time allowance • t - exclusion for touching the tapes • x - other exclusion • e - retired or mechanical failure • f - fell • ns - non-starter • nc - non-classify

gate A - inside	gate B	gate C	gate D - outside

=== Polish qualifying ===
- 6 seeded to World Final
- 1 Alfred Smoczyk Stadium, Leszno, 14 Jun; 2 Hasiok, Świętochłowice, 16 June; 3 Rybnik Municipal Stadium, 26 Jun; 4 Polonia Bydgoszcz Stadium, 3 Jul; 5 Stadion żużlowy Gorzów, 10 Jul; 6 Stadion Kolejarz, Opole, 31 Jul; 7 Olympic Stadium, Wrocław, 7 Aug; 8 Stadion Wybrzeże, Gdańsk, 9 Aug

Pos.	Rider	1	2	3	4	5	6	7	8	Total
1	(Poland) Jan Mucha	6	14	12	13	12	8	6	13	72
2	(Poland) Pawel Waloszek	9	12	11	6	12	11	12	13	71
3	(Poland) Andrzej Wyglenda	8	12	9	14	14	5	10	9	68
4	(Poland) Antoni Woryna	9	5	14	10	8	12	10	5	63
5	(Poland) Henryk Glucklich	12	9	3	9	9	6	12	7	58
6	(Poland) Jerzy Szczakiel	11	12	8	11	6	7	3	ns	58
7	(Poland) Zygfryd Friedek	7	7	9	7	10	12	11	ns	56
8	(Poland) Jozef Jarmula	6	11	10	8	6	6	ns	13	54
9	(Poland) Stanislaw Kasa	10	4	8	9	8	7	7	6	49
10	(Poland) Edmund Migoś	7	4	5	9	7	9	11	1	48
11	(Poland) Zygmunt Pytko	7	3	8	3	ns	7	10	+0	38
12	(Poland) Stanislaw Skowron	6	4	5	3	0	11	6	ns	35
13	(Poland) Henryk Żyto	8	8	4	5	ns	5	0	4	34
14	(Poland) Jerzy Trzeszkowski	0	7	7	0	5	ns	ns	12	31
15	(Poland) Piotr Bruzda	7	2	2	1	7	5	3	5	29
16	(Poland) Stanisław Tkocz	5	4	5	9	3	ns	ns	ns	26
17	(Poland) Zbigniew Podlecki	ns	ns	ns	ns	ns	2	5	11	18
18	(Poland) Jerzy Gryt	ns	ns	ns	ns	ns	6	5	ns	11
19	(Poland) Wiktor Waloszek	ns	ns	ns	ns	ns	ns	3	7	10
20	(Poland) Jerzy Padewski	ns	ns	ns	ns	8	ns	ns	ns	8
21	(Poland) Leszek Marsz	ns	ns	ns	ns	ns	ns	ns	8	8

== World Final ==
- 6 September 1970
- (Poland) Olympic Stadium, Wrocław

Placing	Rider	Total	1	2	3	4	5	6	7	8	9	10	11	12	13	14	15	16	17	18	19	20	Pts	Pos
1	(New Zealand) (10) Ivan Mauger	15			3			3						3			3		3				15	1
2	(Poland) (16) Paweł Waloszek	14				3				3	3						2			3			14	2
3	(Poland) (1) Antoni Woryna	13	3				3				2				3				2				13	3
4	(Sweden) (15) Sören Sjösten	9				2			3			1						3	0				9	4
5	(Poland) (2) Henryk Glücklich	9	2					2				3				2				0			9	5
6	(Soviet Union) (13) Valeri Klementiev	8				0	1							1		3					3		8	6
7	(New Zealand) (11) Barry Briggs	7			2				1		0					1						3	7	7
8	(Poland) (14) Andrzej Wyglenda	7				1		0					3		2							1	7	8
9	(Sweden) (4) Anders Michanek	7	0							1				2				2				2	7	9
10	(Denmark) (7) Ole Olsen	6		3					2					0	E					1			6	10
11	(Poland) (9) Jan Mucha	6			1		2						0					1		2			6	11
12	(East Germany) (3) Hans Jürgen Fritz	5	1						0				1				1				2		5	12
13	(Soviet Union) (6) Vladimir Gordeev	5		2				1			1							0			1		5	13
14	(Soviet Union) (12) Gennady Kurilenko	2			F					2		F			-						-		2	14
15	(Poland) (8) Zygfryd Friedek	2		F						0			2			F			-				2	15
16	(England) (5) Trevor Hedge	0		E			E					F					R					-	0	16
R1	(Poland) (R1) Edmund Migoś	4										2			1				1		F	0	4	R1
R2	(Poland) (R2) Jerzy Szczakiel	0																					0	R2
Placing	Rider	Total	1	2	3	4	5	6	7	8	9	10	11	12	13	14	15	16	17	18	19	20	Pts	Pos

m - exclusion for exceeding two minute time allowance • t - exclusion for touching the tapes • x - other exclusion • e - retired or mechanical failure • f - fell • ns - non-starter • nc - non-classify

gate A - inside	gate B	gate C	gate D - outside
