= 1970 Speedway World Team Cup =

11th edition of the annual motorcycle speedway World Cup competition

Seasons
- ← 1969 1971 →

The 1970 Speedway World Team Cup was the 11th edition of the FIM Speedway World Team Cup to determine the team world champions.

The final took place at Wembley Stadium in London. The title was won by Sweden for the sixth time.

== Qualification ==
=== British Round ===
Great Britain seeded to World Final (Commonwealth riders eligible for British team)

=== Scandinavian Round ===
- June 14
- (Sweden) Ljungheden, Västervik
- Att: 1,450

1st	2nd	3rd	4th
Sweden - 39; Ove Fundin - 12; Anders Michanek - 12; Bengt Jansson - 10; Per Olof Söderman - 4 Kjell Haage - 1	Norway - 32; Odd Fossengen - 9 Øyvind S. Berg - 8 Reidar Eide - 8 Edgar Stangeland - 7 Dag Lovaas - ns	Denmark - 25; Ole Olsen - 9 Neils Weiss - 6 Kurt Bøgh - 5 Bent Nørregaard-Jensen - 5 Jörn Mogensen - ns	Finland - 0 Erkki Hannula - 0 Reima Lohkovuori - 0 Jouko Naskali - 0 Matti Olin - 0 Markku Tarkkanen - 0

* Sweden to World Final

=== Continental Round ===
==== Quarterfinal 1 ====
- 21 June
- (Socialist Federal Republic of Yugoslavia) Gradski stadion, Crikvenica

1st	2nd	3rd	4th
Czechoslovakia - 48; Miloslav Verner - 12; Zdeněk Majstr - 12; Jiří Štancl - 12; Václav Verner - 12; Jan Klokocka - ns	Yugoslavia - 28; Drago Regvart; Drago Perko; Ivan Molan; Drasko Orsic; Jose Visocnik	Bulgaria - 20; Alexander Kostov; Peter Petkov; Petr Iliev; Georgi Macev	Italy - 4 Gianni Pizzo; Giovanni Pizzo; Annibale Pretto; Gilberto Roncolato

- Czechoslovakia and Yugoslavia to Semifinal

==== Quarterfinal 2 ====
- 21 June
- (West Germany) Speedway Stadion, Ruhpolding

1st	2nd	3rd	4th
East Germany - 44; Hans Jürgen Fritz - 12; Jürgen Hehlert - 11; Dieter Tetzlaff - 11; Peter Liebing - 7 Gerhard Uhlenbrock - 3	Hungary - 26; Pal Perenyi - 8 Barnabas Gyepes - 7 Sandor Csatho - 6 Ferenc Radacsi - 5	West Germany - 18; Rudolf Kastl - 6 Christoph Betzl - 6 Josef Angermüller - 6 Alois Wiesböck - 0 Dieter Dauderer - 0	Austria - 8 Günther Walla - 3 Josef Haider - 3 Alfred Rinzner - 1 Helmut Schippl - 1

- East Germany and Hungary to Semifinal

==== Semifinal ====
- 5 July
- (East Germany) Güstrow Speedway Stadium, Güstrow
- Att: 12,000

Draw 1. (Socialist Federal Republic of Yugoslavia) → (East Germany) B

1st	2nd	3rd	4th
East Germany - 45; Hans Jürgen Fritz - 12; Jürgen Hehlert - 12; Dieter Tetzlaff - 12; Peter Liebing - 7 Gerhard Uhlenbrock - 2	Czechoslovakia - 27; Jiří Štancl - 8 Zdeněk Majstr - 7 Václav Verner - 7 Jan Klokocka - 5 Jaroslav Volf - ns	East Germany B - 16; Jochen Dinse - 6 Kurt Martens - 4 Klaus Volker - 4 Horst Kruger - 2 Wilfried Schneider - ns	Hungary - 8 Pal Perenyi - 3 Sandor Csatho - 2 Barnabas Gyepes - 2 Ferenc Radacsi - 1

- East Germany and Czechoslovakia to Continental Final

==== Continental Final ====
- 26 July
- (Czechoslovakia) Slaný Speedway Stadium, Slaný
- Att: 7,000

Placing	Team / Rider name	Total	1	2	3	4	5	6	7	8	9	10	11	12	13	14	15	16	Pts	17	18	19	20
1	Czechoslovakia	32	1	4	4	6	8	11	12	15	17	19	21	23	26	28	29	32		32	32	32	32
1	(5) Václav Verner	9	1					3					2					3	9
1	(6) Zdeněk Majstr	8		3			2							2			1		8
1	(7) Jiří Štancl	7				2			1			2				2			7
1	(8) Jan Holub I	8			0					3	2				3				8
1	(18) Miloslav Verner	0																	0
2	Poland	29	0	2	4	7	7	7	10	11	14	15	18	21	23	26	27	29		29	29	29	29
2	(1) Paweł Waloszek	9				3				1				3				2	9
2	(2) Andrzej Wyglenda	9			2				3				3				1		9
2	(3) Jan Mucha	5		2				0				1			2				5
2	(4) Zygfryd Friedek	6	0				0				3					3			6
2	(17) Henryk Glücklich	0																	0
3	Soviet Union	18	3	4	4	7	8	11	11	12	15	16	16	16	17	18	18	18		18	18	18	18
3	(9) Valeri Klementiev	2			0		1					1						0	2
3	(10) Vladimir Gordeev	9				3		3			3						0		9
3	(11) Gennady Kurilenko	3		1						1			0			1			3
3	(12) Yury Dubinin	4	3						0					0	1				4
3	(19) Vladimir Kononovich	0																	0
4	East Germany	16	0	2	3	3	5	5	7	9	10	11	11	11	11	11	13	16		16	16	16	16
4	(13) Hans Jürgen Fritz	8		2					2		1							3	8
4	(14) Jürgen Hehlert	5	0							2		1					2		5
4	(15) Dieter Tetzlaff	1			1			0						0		0			1
4	(16) Peter Liebing	2				0	2						0		0				2
4	(20) Gerhard Uhlenbrock	0																	0
Placing	Team / Rider name	Total	1	2	3	4	5	6	7	8	9	10	11	12	13	14	15	16	Pts	17	18	19	20

M - exclusion for exceeding two-minute time allowance • T - exclusion for touching the tapes • X - other exclusion • E - retired or mechanical failure • F - fell

Helmet colours were permanent for each team (Red, Blue, White and Yellow/Black). Colours in diagrams indicate gate positions:
gate A – inside	gate B	gate C	gate D – outside

* Czechoslovakia and Poland to World Final

== World Final ==
- 19 September
- (England) Wembley Stadium, London
- Att: 35,000

1st	2nd	3rd	4th
Sweden - 42; 13.Bengt Jansson (3,3,2,3) - 11; 14.Ove Fundin (2,3,3,3) - 11; 15.Anders Michanek (3,2,3,2) - 10; 16.Sören Sjösten (2,3,2,3) - 10; 20.Bernt Persson - ns	Great Britain - 31; 1.Ivan Mauger (3,3,2,1) - 9; 2.Barry Briggs (3,2,3,3) - 11; 3.Nigel Boocock (1,-,1,-) - 2; 4.Eric Boocock (2,2,1,-) - 5; 17.Ray Wilson (-,-,2,-,2/f) - 4	Poland - 20; 5.Antoni Woryna (1,0,3,1) - 5; 6.Jan Mucha (1,1,2,2) - 6; 7.Paweł Waloszek (1,1,0,-) - 2; 8.Edmund Migoś (2,1,t,1) - 4; 18.Henryk Glücklich (-,1,-,2) - 3	Czechoslovakia - 3; 9.Zdeněk Majstr (0,0,0,-) - 0; 10.Václav Verner (0,1,1,1) - 3; 11.Miloslav Verner (0,f,-,0) - 0; 12.Jiří Štancl (0,0,0,0) - 0; 19.Jan Holub I - (-,-,0,0) - 0

== See also ==
- 1970 Individual Speedway World Championship
- 1970 Speedway World Pairs Championship
