= 1969 Speedway World Team Cup =

10th edition of the annual motorcycle speedway World Cup competition

Seasons
- ← 1968 1970 →

The 1969 Speedway World Team Cup was the tenth edition of the FIM Speedway World Team Cup to determine the team world champions.

The final took place at the Rybnik Municipal Stadium in Rybnik, Poland. The host nation won the title for the fourth time.

== Qualification ==
=== British Round ===
Great Britain was seeded to the Final (Commonwealth riders eligible for the British team)

=== Scandinavian Round ===
- 5 June
- (Denmark) Speedway Center, Fredericia

1st	2nd	3rd	4th
Sweden – Bernt Persson ? ? ?	Norway – Øyvind S. Berg; Reidar Eide ? ?	Denmark – ? ? ? ?	Finland – ? ? ? ?

* Sweden to Final

=== Contmnental Round ===
Continental Semifinal

- June 15
- (Socialist Federal Republic of Yugoslavia) Kovinar Stadium, Maribor

1st	2nd	3rd	4th
East Germany – 41; Gerhard Uhlenbrock – 12; Jochen Dinse – 10; Hans Jürgen Fritz – 10; Peter Liebing – 9	West Germany – 23; Manfred Poschenreider – 10; Rudolf Kastl – 7 Dieter Dauderer – 4 Rainer Jüngling – 2	Hungary – 16; Ferenc Radacsi – 6 Janos Szoeke – 5 Sandor Csatho – 4 Istvan Redoczi – 1	Yugoslavia – 15; Drago Perko – 8 Milovan Stanković – 4 Joze Visocnik – 2 Milija Stojković – 1

* East Germany to Continental Final

Continental Final

- August 3
- (Soviet Union) Leningrad Speedway Stadium, Leningrad
- Att: 9,000

Placing	Team / Rider name	Total	1	2	3	4	5	6	7	8	9	10	11	12	13	14	15	16	Pts	17	18	19	20
1	Soviet Union	41	0	3	6	8	11	14	17	20	22	24	27	30	32	35	38	41		41	41	41	41
1	(9) Gennady Kurilenko	11			3		3					2						3	11
1	(10) Vladimir Smirnov	10				2		3			2						3		10
1	(11) Valeri Klementiev	12		3						3			3			3			12
1	(12) Yury Dubinin	8	E						3					3	2				8
1	(19) Viktor Trofimov	0																	0
2	Poland	35	3	5	7	10	12	14	14	16	19	22	24	26	29	31	33	35		35	35	35	35
2	(1) Zbigniew Podlecki	9				3				2				2				2	9
2	(2) Antoni Woryna	4			2				F				2				-		4
2	(3) Edward Jancarz	10		2				2				3			3				10
2	(4) Andrzej Wyglenda	10	3				2				3					2			10
2	(17) Henryk Glücklich	2															2		2
3	East Germany	10	2	2	3	3	4	4	5	6	7	7	8	9	10	10	10	10		10	10	10	10
3	(13) Peter Liebing	2		0					1		1							0	2
3	(14) Jochen Dinse	3	2							1		0					F		3
3	(15) Gerhard Uhlenbrock	2			1			0						1		0			2
3	(16) Hans Jürgen Fritz	3				0	1						1		1				3
3	(20) Dieter Tetzlaff	0																	0
4	Czechoslovakia	9	0	1	1	2	2	3	5	5	5	6	6	6	6	7	8	9		9	9	9	9
4	(5) Karel Prusa	2	F					1					0					1	2
4	(6) Jan Holub I	2		1			0							0			1		2
4	(7) Miloslav Verner	5				1			2			1				1			5
4	(8) Frantisek Ledecky	0			0					E	0				E				0
4	(18) Jiří Štancl	0																	0
Placing	Team / Rider name	Total	1	2	3	4	5	6	7	8	9	10	11	12	13	14	15	16	Pts	17	18	19	20

M - exclusion for exceeding two-minute time allowance • T - exclusion for touching the tapes • X - other exclusion • E - retired or mechanical failure • F - fell

Helmet colours were permanent for each team (Red, Blue, White and Yellow/Black). Colours in diagrams indicate gate positions:
gate A – inside	gate B	gate C	gate D – outside

* Soviet Union and Poland to Final

== World Final ==
- 21 September
- (Poland) Rybnik Municipal Stadium, Rybnik
- Att: 45,000

Placing	Team / Rider name	Total	1	2	3	4	5	6	7	8	9	10	11	12	13	14	15	16	Pts	17	18	19	20
1	Poland	31	3	5	5	6	9	11	14	16	16	16	19	22	25	25	28	31		31	31	31	31
1	(5) Edward Jancarz	11	3					2					3					3	11
1	(6) Andrzej Wyglenda	11		2			3							3			3		11
1	(7) Stanisław Tkocz	4				1			3			0				F			4
1	(8) Henryk Glücklich	3			F					-	-				3				3
1	(18) Andrzej Pogorzelski	2								2	0								2
2	(United Kingdom) Great Britain	27	2	5	7	7	7	8	10	11	14	17	17	19	21	24	25	27		27	27	27	27
2	(1) Martin Ashby	5				0				1				2				2	5
2	(2) Nigel Boocock	5			2				2				F				1		5
2	(3) Ivan Mauger	9		3				1				3			2				9
2	(4) Barry Briggs	8	2				F				3					3			8
2	(17) Pete Smith	0																	0
3	Soviet Union	23	0	1	4	6	8	11	12	15	17	19	20	20	20	20	22	23		23	23	23	23
3	(9) Gennady Kurilenko	8			3		2					2						1	8
3	(10) Vladimir Smirnov	9				2		3			2						2		9
3	(11) Valeri Klementiev	5		1						3			1			F			5
3	(12) Yury Dubinin	1	F						1					0	-				1
3	(19) Viktor Trofimov	0													0				0
4	Sweden	12	1	1	2	5	6	6	6	6	7	8	10	11	12	12	12	12		12	12	12	12
4	(13) Bengt Jansson	1		0					0		1							0	1
4	(14) Sören Sjösten	2	1							0		1					0		2
4	(15) Ove Fundin	2			1			0						1		-			2
4	(16) Anders Michanek	7				3	1						2		1				7
4	(20) Torbjörn Harrysson	0																	0
Placing	Team / Rider name	Total	1	2	3	4	5	6	7	8	9	10	11	12	13	14	15	16	Pts	17	18	19	20

M - exclusion for exceeding two-minute time allowance • T - exclusion for touching the tapes • X - other exclusion • E - retired or mechanical failure • F - fell

Helmet colours were permanent for each team (Red, Blue, White and Yellow/Black). Colours in diagrams indicate gate positions:
gate A – inside	gate B	gate C	gate D – outside

== See also ==
- 1969 Individual Speedway World Championship
- 1969 Speedway World Pairs Championship
