= 1971 Individual Speedway World Championship =

Motorcycle speedway world championship season

Seasons
- ← 1970 1972 →

The 1971 Individual Speedway World Championship was the 26th edition of the official World Championship to determine the world champion rider.

Ole Olsen became the first Danish winner of the Championship. His 15-point maximum denied Ivan Mauger from winning a fourth consecutive title. Mauger won the silver medal run-off against Bengt Jansson.

== Format changes ==
The format of the Championship changed again for the 1971 event. This time the Swedish riders were allowed six places in the World Final to be held in Sweden. All other nations had to go through the European Final route to provide the remaining 10 riders for the World Final.

== First round ==
Qualification results.

=== British/Commonwealth qualifying ===
- Top 32 to British/Commonwealth semi-finals

Date	Venue	Winner	2nd	3rd
17 April	The Shay, Halifax	Dave Younghusband	Ronnie Moore	Bill Andrew
17 April	Abbey Stadium, Swindon	Barry Briggs	Martin Ashby	George Hunter
19 April	Reading Stadium, Reading	Ivan Mauger	Jim Airey	Howard Cole
19 April	County Ground Stadium, Exeter	Eric Boocock	Bob Kilby	Dave Younghusband
20 April	West Ham Stadium, London	Reg Luckhurst	Nigel Boocock	Greg Kentwell
20 April	Leicester Stadium, Leicester	Ray Wilson	Tommy Roper	John Boulger
21 April	Wimborne Road, Poole	Barry Briggs	Tony Lomas	Martin Ashby
22 April	Wimbledon Stadium, London	Garry Middleton	John Boulger	Ronnie Moore
22 April	Owlerton Stadium, Sheffield	Eric Boocock	Brian Leonard	Jim Airey
22 April	Oxford Stadium, Oxford	Martin Ashby	Colin Gooddy	Charlie Monk
23 April	Monmore Green, Wolverhampton	Terry Betts	Bob Andrews	Ivan Mauger
23 April	Hampden Park, Glasgow	Howard Cole	Eric Broadbelt	Norman Hunter
24 April	Hyde Road, Manchester	Ivan Mauger	George Hunter	Sándor Lévai
24 April	Brandon Stadium, Coventry	Tony Lomas	Alan Cowland	Col Cottrell
24 April	King's Lynn Stadium, King's Lynn	Malcolm Simmons	Ray Wilson	Terry Betts
26 April	Dudley Wood Stadium, Dudley	Roy Trigg	Garry Middleton	Peter Jarman
28 April	Brandon Stadium, Coventry	Tony Lomas	Bruce Cribb	Ken McKinlay
30 April	Hackney Wick Stadium, London	Barry Thomas	Garry Middleton	Bob Kilby
30 April	Somerton Park, Newport	Sándor Lévai	Nigel Boocock	Bill Andrew

== Second round ==
=== Norwegian qualifying ===
- 20 September 1970
- (Norway) Geiteryggen Speedwaybane, Skien
- Top 1 (+6 seeded) to Nordic final 1971

Pos.	Rider	Points
1	Reidar Eide	15
2	Ulf Lovaas	12
3	Svein Kaasa	11
4	Einar Egedius	11
5	Odd Fossengen	10
6	Jan Terje Gravningen	10
7	Jon Odegaard	10
8	Jorn Flatha	9
9	Dag Lovaas	6
10	Dagfinn Dahl	6
11	Johnny Larsen	5
12	Kjell Todnem	5
13	Nils O. Haraldsen	3
14	Thorbjorn Nygaard	3
15	Ragnar Olaisen	2
16	Leif O. Jorgensen	2

=== Finnish qualifying (top 8) ===
- (2 rounds) 11 Aug & 25 Aug 1970
- (Finland) Kärpänen Speedway, Lahti & Eteläpuisto, Tampere
- Top 2 to Nordic final 1971

Pos.	Rider	Points	Total
1	Kalevi Lahtinen	8+8	16
2	Matti Olin	6+6	12
3	Jouko Naskali	2+3	5
4	Erkki Hannula	4+0	4
5	Pekka Kulmala	0+4	4
6	Reima Lohkovuori	3+1	4
7	Timo Sinkkonen	0+2	2
8	Olavi Turunen	1+0	1

=== Continental qualifying ===
- Top 32 to Continental semi-finals

Date	Venue	Winner	2nd	3rd
8 May	(Italy) Stadio Moretti, Udine	(Soviet Union) Aleksandr Pavlov	(Poland) Jerzy Szczakiel	(Soviet Union) Viktor Trofimov
9 May	(Czechoslovakia) Markéta Stadium, Prague	(East Germany) Hans Jürgen Fritz	(Czechoslovakia) Jiří Štancl	(East Germany) Peter Liebing
9 May	(Hungary) Borsod Volán Stadion, Miskolc	(Czechoslovakia) Jan Holub I	(Soviet Union) Vladimir Smirnov	(Poland) Henryk Glucklich
9 May	(West Germany) Abensberger Stadion, Abensberg	(Poland) Jan Mucha	(Poland) Andrzej Wyglenda	(Poland) Antoni Woryna

=== British/Commonwealth semi-finals ===
- 18 May
- (England) West Ham Stadium, London
- Top 8 to British/Commonwealth final

Pos.	Rider	Points
1	(New Zealand) Ronnie Moore	15
2	(Australia) John Boulger	13
3	(New Zealand) Barry Briggs	12
4	(England) Bob Kilby	10
5	(England) Arnie Haley	9
6	(England) Martin Ashby	9
7	(Australia) Geoff Curtis	8
8	(Australia) Garry Middleton	7
9	(England) Tommy Roper	7
10	(New Zealand) Bruce Cribb	6
11	(England) Roy Trigg	5
12	(Scotland) Ken McKinlay	3
13	(Scotland) George Hunter	2
14	(England) Colin Gooddy	2
15	(England) Ian Turner	1
16	(England) Stan Stevens (res)	0
17	(England) Alan Sage (res)	0

- 20 May
- (England) Owlerton Stadium, Sheffield
- Top 8 to British/Commonwealth final

Pos.	Rider	Points
1	(New Zealand) Ivan Mauger	14
2	(England) Ray Wilson	14
3	(England) Nigel Boocock	13
4	(England) Eric Boocock	13
5	(Wales) Howard Cole	10
6	(Scotland) Bert Harkins	9
7	(England) Tony Lomas	9
8	(England) Dave Younghusband	8
9	(England) Bob Andrews	8
10	(England) Malcom Simmons	7
11	(England) Terry Betts	4
12	(England) Norman Storer	4
13	(Hungary) Sándor Lévai	3
14	(England) Alan Cowland	2
15	(Australia) Charlie Monk	1
16	(England) Tony Clarke	

== Third round ==
=== British/Commonwealth Final ===
- 16 June 1971
- (England) Brandon Stadium, Coventry
- First 12 to British-Nordic Final

Placing	Rider	Total	1	2	3	4	5	6	7	8	9	10	11	12	13	14	15	16	17	18	19	20	Pts	Pos
1	(New Zealand) (7) Ivan Mauger	14		3					3					3	3					2			14	1
2	(New Zealand) (2) Barry Briggs	13	3					2				2				3				3			13	2
3	(England) (6) Tony Lomas	12		0				3			3							3			3		12	3
4	(Scotland) (16) Bert Harkins	9				2				2	2						3			0			9	4
5	(England) (15) Ray Wilson	8				3			1			3						1	0				8	5
6	(England) (5) Martin Ashby	8		2			2					1					1					2	8	6
7	(New Zealand) (9) Ronnie Moore	7			1		0						3					2		1			7	7
8	(England) (13) Dave Younghusband	7				0	3							1		2					1		7	8
9	(England) (11) Bob Kilby	7			2				2		1					1						1	7	9
10	(England) (4) Eric Boocock	6	0							3				0				T				3	6	10
11	(Australia) (12) Jim Airey	6			3					1		0			2						0		6	11
12	(England) (8) Nigel Boocock	6		1						X			2			0			3				6	12
13	(Wales) (10) Howard Cole	6			0			1						2			2		1				6	13
14	(Australia) (1) Geoff Curtis	6	2				1				0				1				2				6	14
15	(Australia) (3) John Boulger	4	1						0				1				0				2		4	15
16	(England) (14) Arnold Haley	1				1		0					0		0							0	1	16
	(New Zealand) (17) Bill Andrew	0																0					0	
	(Australia) (18) Garry Middleton	0																					0	
Placing	Rider	Total	1	2	3	4	5	6	7	8	9	10	11	12	13	14	15	16	17	18	19	20	Pts	Pos

m - exclusion for exceeding two minute time allowance • t - exclusion for touching the tapes • x - other exclusion • e - retired or mechanical failure • f - fell • ns - non-starter • nc - non-classify

gate A - inside	gate B	gate C	gate D - outside

=== Nordic Final ===
- 6 June 1971
- (Denmark) Selskov Stadium, Hillerød
- First 4 to British/Commonwealth-Nordic Final

Placing	Rider	Total	1	2	3	4	5	6	7	8	9	10	11	12	13	14	15	16	17	18	19	20	Pts	Pos	21
1	(Denmark) (5) Ole Olsen	14		3			3					3					3					2	14	1	
2	(Norway) (1) Reidar Eide	12	3				2				2				3				2				12	2	
3	(Denmark) (11) Bent Nørregaard-Jensen	11			2				T		3					3						3	11	3	
4	(Denmark) (12) Kurt Bøgh	11			3					3		2			1						2		11	4	
5	(Norway) (4) Odd Fossengen	10	2							2				3				3				F	10	5	
6	(Denmark) (7) Niels Weiss Sorensen	10		1					2					2	2					3			10	6	
7	(Norway) (6) Øyvind S. Berg	10		2				2			1							2			3		10	7	
8	(Denmark) (3) Jorn Morgensen	9	0						3				3				2				1		9	8	
9	(Denmark) (2) Bjarne Nyegaard	8	1					3				1				2				1			8	9	
10	(Denmark) (10) Preben Rosenkilde	6			1			0						1			1		3				6	10	
11	(Norway) (9) Svein Kaasa	6			0		1						2					1		2			6	11	
12	(Finland) (14) Kalevi Lahtinen	5				3		1					0		0							1	5	12	
13	(Norway) (8) Edgar Stangeland	4		0						1			1			1			1				4	13	
14	(Norway) (13) Dag Lovaas	2				2	0							0		0					0		2	14	
15	(Finland) (16) Matti Olin	1				1				0	0						0			0			1	15	
16	(Norway) (15) Jan Terje Gravningen	1				0			1			F						-	-				1	16	
R1	(Denmark) (R1) Flemming Larsen	0																0	0				0	R1	
Placing	Rider	Total	1	2	3	4	5	6	7	8	9	10	11	12	13	14	15	16	17	18	19	20	Pts	Pos	21

m - exclusion for exceeding two minute time allowance • t - exclusion for touching the tapes • x - other exclusion • e - retired or mechanical failure • f - fell • ns - non-starter • nc - non-classify

gate A - inside	gate B	gate C	gate D - outside

=== Continental semi-finals ===
- 5 June
- (East Germany) Güstrow Speedway Stadium, Güstrow
- Top 8 to Continental final

Pos.	Rider	Points
1	(East Germany) Hans Jürgen Fritz	14
2	(Poland) Henryk Glücklich	11
3	(Czechoslovakia) Jan Holub I	11
4	(Poland) Piotr Bruzda	10.5
5	(Poland) Stanislaw Kasa	10
6	(East Germany) Dieter Tetzlaff	10
7	(East Germany) Horst Krüger	9
8	(Czechoslovakia) Jiří Štancl	8
9	(Soviet Union) Vladimir Smirnov	7.5
10	(Soviet Union) Viktor Kalmykov	6
11	(Hungary) Janos Szöke	6
12	(East Germany) Peter Liebing	6
13	(East Germany) Clemens Bever	6
14	(Poland) Zbigniew Podlecki	3
15	(Czechoslovakia) Zbynek Novotny	2
16	(Hungary) Ferenc Radacsi	0

- 6 June
- (Poland) Stadion żużlowy, Gorzów Wielkopolski
- Top 8 to Continental final

Pos.	Rider	Points
1	(Soviet Union) Gennadij Kurilenko	11
2	(Poland) Jerzy Szczakiel	11
3	(Soviet Union) Vladimir Gordeev	11
4	(Soviet Union) Grigorij Khlynovski	11
5	(Soviet Union) Anatolij Kuzmin	10
6	(Soviet Union) Viktor Trofimov	10
7	(Poland) Jan Mucha	10
8	(Poland) Paweł Waloszek	9+3
9	(Soviet Union) Alexander Pavlov	9+2
10	(Poland) Andrzej Wyglenda	7
11	(Czechoslovakia) Pavel Mares	6
12	(Czechoslovakia) Miroslav Verner	5
13	(Poland) Antoni Woryna	4
14	(Czechoslovakia) Václav Verner	3
15	(Poland) Jerzy Trzeszkowski	3
16	(Czechoslovakia) Milan Špinka	0

== Fourth round ==
=== Swedish qualifying ===
- Top 4 in each heat to Swedish final

(1 May, Gamla Speedway Track, Visby)
Pos	Rider	Points
1	Bengt Jansson	15
2	Leif Enecrona	14
3	Bo Wirebrand	12
4	Tommy Jansson	11
5	Börje Ohlsson	11
6	Therje Henriksson	10
7	Kenneth Selmosson	7
8	Bengt Olsson	7
9	Bengt Svensson	5
10	Lars-Åke Andersson	5
11	Tommy Johansson	5
12	Bertil Andersson	4
13	Åke Andersson	3
14	Casimir Nilsson	2
15	Egon Stengarn	1
16	Roger Gullbrandsgård	0

(1 May, Gislaved Motorbana, Gislaved)
Pos	Rider	Points
1	Göte Nordin	15
2	Bernt Persson	13
3	Hasse Holmqvist	11
4	Rolf Johansson	10
5	Käll Haage	9
6	Claes Löfstrand	9
7	Christer Sjösten	8
8	Leif Johansson	7
9	Bo Magnusson	7
10	Karl-Erik Claesson	7
11	Göran Jansso	6
12	Torbjörn Karlsson	5
13	Nils Eriksson	5
14	Börje Meli	5
15	Torbjörn Runesson	2
16	Hans Engzell	1

(2 May, Gamla Motorstadion, Målilla)
Pos	Rider	Points
1	Sören Sjösten	15
2	Anders Michanek	11
3	Runo Wedin	11
4	Sven-Inge Svensson	10
5	Christer Löfqvist	10
6	Jan Simensen	10
7	Hans Johansson	10
8	Sune Stark	9
9	Inge Gustavsson	8
10	Tommy Bergqvist	8
11	Ingemar Thillander	6
12	Anders Jansson	5
13	Lennart Johansson	3
14	Ove Helander	2
15	Anders Lövgre	1
16	Börje Klingberg	1

(3 May, Malmö Stadion, Malmö)
Pos	Rider	Points
1	Per-Olof Söderman	14
2	Olle Nygren	13
3	Bo Josefsson	13
4	Lars Jansson	13
5	Bengt Larsson	11
6	Willy Karlsson	10
7	Berndt Johansson	9
8	Sigvard Johansson	8
9	Håkan Karlsson	7
10	Jan-Inge Karlsson	5
11	Tommy Wedén	5
12	Harald Andersson	4
13	Lars Jennefors	3
14	Roland Karlsson	2
15	Arne Hansson (res)	2
16	Ragnar Holm	1
17	Sven-Olov Lindh	0

=== British/Commonwealth/Nordic Final ===
- 30 July 1971
- (Scotland) Hampden Park, Glasgow
- First 8 to European Final

Placing	Rider	Total	1	2	3	4	5	6	7	8	9	10	11	12	13	14	15	16	17	18	19	20	Pts	Pos
1	(New Zealand) (2) Ivan Mauger	14	3					3				3				3				2			14	1
2	(England) (6) Ray Wilson	13		3				2			3							2			3		13	2
3	(Denmark) (9) Ole Olsen	11			2		3						2					3		1			11	3
4	(England) (12) Nigel Boocock	11			3					3		2			2						1		11	4
5	(Australia) (1) Jim Airey	9	2				2				0				3				2				9	5
6	(England) (16) Eric Boocock	9				1				1	2						2			3			9	6
7	(England) (4) Tony Lomas	9	1							2				3				1				2	9	7
8	(New Zealand) (11) Ronnie Moore	9			0				3		1					2						3	9	8
9	(New Zealand) (10) Barry Briggs	7			1			0						F			3		3				7	9
10	(England) (8) Dave Younghusband	7		2						0			3			1			1				7	10
11	(Denmark) (13) Kurt Bøgh	6				2	0							2		0					2		6	11
12	(Norway) (14) Reidar Eide	4				3		1					0		-							0	4	12
13	(England) (15) Martin Ashby	3				0			2			1						0	0				3	13
14	(Scotland) (3) Bert Harkins	3	0						1				1				1				0		3	14
15	(England) (5) Bob Kilby	2		1			1					0					0					-	2	15
16	(Denmark) (7) Bent Nørregaard-Jensen	1		0					0					1	0					0			1	16
R1	(Norway) (R1) Odd Fossengen	1													1								1	R1
R2	(Australia) (R2) John Boulger	1																				1	1	R2
Placing	Rider	Total	1	2	3	4	5	6	7	8	9	10	11	12	13	14	15	16	17	18	19	20	Pts	Pos

m - exclusion for exceeding two minute time allowance • t - exclusion for touching the tapes • x - other exclusion • e - retired or mechanical failure • f - fell • ns - non-starter • nc - non-classify

gate A - inside	gate B	gate C	gate D - outside

=== Continental Final ===
- 26 June 1971
- (Czechoslovakia) Slaný Speedway Stadium, Slaný
- First 8 to European Final plus 1 reserve

Placing	Rider	Total	1	2	3	4	5	6	7	8	9	10	11	12	13	14	15	16	17	18	19	20	Pts	Pos	21
1	(Poland) (14) Henryk Glucklich	10				1		3					3		3							0	10	1	3
2	(Poland) (12) Jan Mucha	10			0					3		3			2						2		10	2	2
3	(Soviet Union) (7) Gennady Kurilenko	10		1					3					2	1					3			10	3	1
4	(Poland) (15) Jerzy Szczakiel	10				2			1			1						3	3				10	4	0
5	(Soviet Union) (11) Grigory Khlinovsky	9			3				0		0					3						3	9	5	
6	(Soviet Union) (3) Viktor Trofimov	9	0						2				1				3				3		9	6	
7	(Czechoslovakia) (1) Jiří Štancl	9	3				1				3				0				2				9	7	
8	(Soviet Union) (13) Valery Gordeev	9				3	2							3		1					X		9	8	
9	(Poland) (4) Pawel Waloszek	9	2							2				1				2				2	9	9	
10	(Soviet Union) (5) Anatoly Kuzmin	8		2			3					2					F					1	8	10	
11	(Czechoslovakia) (2) Jan Holub I	7	1					2				0				2				2			7	11	
12	(East Germany) (6) Horst Krüger	6		3				0			2							1			F		6	12	
13	(East Germany) (8) Dieter Tetzlaff	4		0						1			2			0			1				4	13	
14	(Poland) (10) Stanislaw Kasa	3			2			1						F			-		-				3	14	
15	(East Germany) (16) Hans Jürgen Fritz	1				0				0	1						F			-			1	15	
16	(Poland) (9) Piotr Bruzda	1			1		0						0					0		0			1	16	
R1	(Czechoslovakia) (R1) Miloslav Verner	3															2		0	1			3	R1	
Placing	Rider	Total	1	2	3	4	5	6	7	8	9	10	11	12	13	14	15	16	17	18	19	20	Pts	Pos	21

m - exclusion for exceeding two minute time allowance • t - exclusion for touching the tapes • x - other exclusion • e - retired or mechanical failure • f - fell • ns - non-starter • nc - non-classify

gate A - inside	gate B	gate C	gate D - outside

== Fifth round ==
=== Swedish Finals ===
- Three races held on
- R1, 1 June at Snälltorpet, Eskilstuna
- R2, 2 June at Norrköping Motorstadion, Norrköping
- R3, 3 June in Gubbängens IP, Stockholm
- Top 6 to World Final & 1 reserve

Pos.	Rider	R1	R2	R3	Total
1	Anders Michanek	14	15	12	41
2	Bengt Jansson	11	11	14	36
3	Bernt Persson	11	14	9	34
4	Leif Enecrona	12	8	11	31
5	Tommy Jansson	10	10	10	30
6	Sören Sjösten	8	7	14	29
7	Göte Nordin	3	12	13	28
8	Hasse Holmqvist	8	10	8	26
9	Lars Jansson	9	7	7	23

Pos.	Rider	R1	R2	R3	Total
10	Olle Nygren	8	5	6	19
11	Bo Wirebrand	4	4	7	15
12	Runo Wedin	4	7	4	15
13	Bo Josefsson	5	4	2	11
14	Sven-Inge Svensson	5	2	3	10
15	Per Olof Söderman	5	3	1	9
16	Herje Henriksson	-	1	0	1
17	Rolf Johansson	0	0	-	0

=== European Final ===
- 21 August 1971
- (England) Wembley Stadium, London
- First 10 to World Final plus 1 reserve

Placing	Rider	Total	1	2	3	4	5	6	7	8	9	10	11	12	13	14	15	16	17	18	19	20	Pts	Pos	21
1	(New Zealand) (13) Ivan Mauger	14				3	2							3		3					3		14	1	
2	(England) (7) Ray Wilson	12		3					3					X	3					3			12	2	3
3	(Denmark) (9) Ole Olsen	12			3		3						3					3		E			12	3	2
4	(England) (16) Nigel Boocock	12				2				3	3						2			2			12	4	X
5	(England) (3) Eric Boocock	10	2						2				2				3				1		10	5	
6	(Australia) (12) Jim Airey	9			2					2		3			T						2		9	6	
7	(Poland) (4) Jerzy Szczakiel	7	3							1				2				1				0	7	7	
8	(New Zealand) (14) Ronnie Moore	7				1		3					1		1							1	7	8	
9	(Soviet Union) (5) Vladimir Gordeev	6		2			0					0					1					3	6	9	3
10	(Czechoslovakia) (2) Jiří Štancl	6	0					2				1				2				1			6	10	2
11	(England) (11) Tony Lomas	6			1				0		2					1						2	6	11	1
12	(Poland) (8) Henryk Glucklich	4		1						X			0			0			3				4	12	
13	(Soviet Union) (6) Grigory Khlinovsky	4		0				1			1							2			0		4	13	
14	(Soviet Union) (1) Viktor Trofimov	4	1				1				0				0				2				4	14	
15	(Poland) (15) Jan Mucha	4				F			1			2						F	1				4	15	
16	(Soviet Union) (10) Gennady Kurilenko	1			0			0						1			0		0				1	16	
R1	(New Zealand) (R1) Barry Briggs	2													2								2	R1	
R2	(Poland) (R2) Pawel Waloszek	0																					0	R2	
Placing	Rider	Total	1	2	3	4	5	6	7	8	9	10	11	12	13	14	15	16	17	18	19	20	Pts	Pos	21

m - exclusion for exceeding two minute time allowance • t - exclusion for touching the tapes • x - other exclusion • e - retired or mechanical failure • f - fell • ns - non-starter • nc - non-classify

gate A - inside	gate B	gate C	gate D - outside

== World Final ==
- 10 September 1971
- (Sweden) Ullevi, Gothenburg
- Referee: (West Germany) Georg Traunspurger

Placing	Rider	Total	1	2	3	4	5	6	7	8	9	10	11	12	13	14	15	16	17	18	19	20	Pts	Pos
1	(Denmark) (14) Ole Olsen	15				3		3					3		3							3	15	1
2	(New Zealand) (7) Ivan Mauger	12+3		3					1					3	2					3			12	2
3	(Sweden) (13) Bengt Jansson	12+3				2	3							1		3					3		12	3
4	(England) (3) Ray Wilson	11	3						3				1				3				1		11	4
5	(Sweden) (4) Anders Michanek	11	2							2				2				3				2	11	5
6	(Sweden) (12) Bernt Persson	9			3					1		2			1						2		9	6
7	(Australia) (5) Jim Airey	8		2			1					3					2					0	8	7
8	(Sweden) (11) Sören Sjösten	8			2				2		2					1						1	8	8
9	(England) (1) Nigel Boocock	6	1				2				1				0				2				6	9
10	(New Zealand) (10) Ronnie Moore	5			1			2						0			1		1				5	10
11	(England) (6) Eric Boocock	4		0				0			3							1			0		4	11
12	(Sweden) (9) Leif Enecrona	4			0		0						0					2		2			4	12
13	(Czech Republic) (2) Jiří Štancl	3	0					1				1				0				1			3	13
14	(Sweden) (16) Tommy Jansson	1				1				0	0						0			0			1	14
15	(Poland) (15) Jerzy Szczakiel	0				0			0			0						0	0				0	15
16	(Soviet Union) (8) Vladimir Gordeev	Dsq		1						3			2			2			3				11	16
	(Sweden) (17) Göte Nordin	0																					0	
	(England) (18) Tony Lomas	0																					0	
Placing	Rider	Total	1	2	3	4	5	6	7	8	9	10	11	12	13	14	15	16	17	18	19	20	Pts	Pos

m - exclusion for exceeding two minute time allowance • t - exclusion for touching the tapes • x - other exclusion • e - retired or mechanical failure • f - fell • ns - non-starter • nc - non-classify

gate A - inside	gate B	gate C	gate D - outside

Note : Vladimir Gordeev was disqualified after illegal additives were found in his fuel.
