= 1968 Speedway World Team Cup =

9th edition of the annual motorcycle speedway World Cup competition

Seasons
- ← 1967 1969 →

The 1968 Speedway World Team Cup was the ninth edition of the FIM Speedway World Team Cup to determine the team world champions.

The final took place at Wembley Stadium in London. The title was won by for the first time by the Great Britain national speedway team. The previous eight editions had all been won by Sweden (five wins) or Poland (three wins).

== Qualification ==
=== Continental Semi-Final ===
- 16 June
- (East Germany) Paul Greifzu Stadium, Stralsund

Pos.	National team	Pts.	Riders
1	East Germany	47	Jochen Dinse 12; Jürgen Hehlert 12; Gerhard Uhlenbrock 12; Hans Jürgen Fritz 11
2	Hungary	18	Barnabas Gyepes 8 Istvan Radoczi 5 Janos Bernath 4 Ferenc Radacsi 1
3	West Germany	18	Manfred Poschenreider 6 Heinrich Sprenger 5 Rudolf Kastl 5 Dieter Dauderer 2
4	Yugoslavia	13	Ivan Molan 5 Franc Babic 4 Valentin Medved 2 Drago Perko 2

=== Continental Final ===
- 28 June
- (Czechoslovakia) Slaný Speedway Stadium, Slaný

Pos.	National team	Pts.	Riders
1	Poland	43	Andrzej Wyglenda 12; Paweł Waloszek 12; Antoni Woryna 12; Henryk Glucklich 6 Jerzy Padewski 1
2	Czechoslovakia	26	Jan Holub I 9 Jaroslav Volf 8 Frantisek Ledecky 6 Miloslav Verner 3 Antonín Šváb Sr. 0
3	Soviet Union	19	Viktor Trofimov 7 Vladimir Smirnov 6 Yuri Chekranov 4 Igor Plechanov 1 Gennady Kurilenko 1
4	East Germany	8	Hans Jürgen Fritz 3 Jochen Dinse 2 Gerhard Uhlenbrock 2 Jürgen Hehlert 1

- Great Britain (which included riders from Australia and New Zealand) and Sweden were seeded to the final.

- WORLD FINAL
- 21 September
- (England) London, Wembley Stadium

Pos.	National team	Pts.
1	Great Britain	40
2	Sweden	30
3	Poland	19
4	Czechoslovakia	7

== World final ==
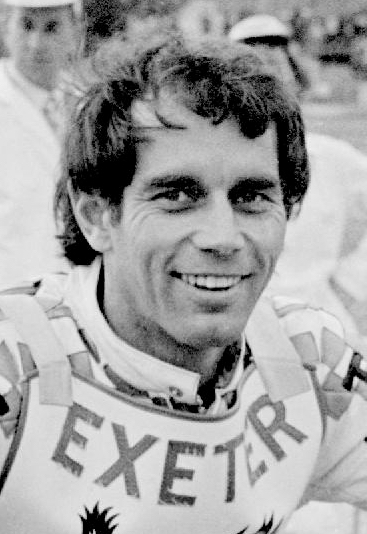
The recently crowned world individual champion Ivan Mauger from New Zealand helped Great Britain win their first World Cup.

- 21 September
- (England) Wembley Stadium

Pos.	National team	Pts.	Riders
1st	Great Britain	40	Ivan Mauger - 12; Nigel Boocock - 10; Martin Ashby - 8 Barry Briggs - 7 Norman Hunter - 3
2nd	Sweden	30	Ove Fundin - 11; Bengt Jansson - 7 Anders Michanek - 7 Olle Nygren - 3 Torbjörn Harrysson - 2
3rd	Poland	19	Edmund Migoś - 8 Edward Jancarz - 6 Andrzej Wyglenda - 2 Henryk Glücklich - 2 Paweł Waloszek - 1
4th	Czechoslovakia	7	Antonín Kasper Sr. - 3 Luboš Tomíček Sr. - 2 Jan Holub I 1 Jaroslav Volf 1

== See also ==
- 1968 Individual Speedway World Championship
- 1968 Speedway World Pairs Championship
