= 1967 Speedway World Team Cup =

8th edition of the annual motorcycle speedway World Cup competition

Seasons
- ← 1966 1968 →

The 1967 Speedway World Team Cup was the eighth edition of the FIM Speedway World Team Cup to determine the team world champions.

The final took place in Malmö, Sweden. The title was won by Sweden for the fifth time from defending champions Poland. Great Britain and the Soviet Union drew for third place on 19 points each.

== Qualification ==
=== Continental Semi-Final ===
- 11 June
- (Socialist Federal Republic of Yugoslavia) Kajzerica, Zagreb

Pos.	National team	Pts.	Riders
1	East Germany	47	Peter Liebing 12; Jochen Dinse 12; Bruno Bülau 12; Jürgen Hehlert 11
2	Hungary	30	Barnabas Gyepes 6 Janos Bernath 6 Ferenc Radacsi 5 Istvan Regoczi 3
3	Yugoslavia	16	Valentin Medved 6 Franc Babic 5 Milovan Stankovic 2 Drago Perko 2 Drago Regvart 1
4	West Germany	13	Heinrich Sprenger 6 Dieter Dauderer 3 Rudolf Kastl 2 Rainer Jungling 1 Alfred Aberl 1

=== Continental Final ===
- 25 June
- (Soviet Union) Stroitel Stadium, Ufa

Pos.	National team	Pts.	Riders
1	Soviet Union	37	Viktor Trofimov 11; Igor Plechanov 10; Boris Samorodov 9 Farid Szajnurov 4 Gennady Kurilenko 3
2	Poland	36	Antoni Woryna 12; Andrzej Pogorzelski 11; Paweł Waloszek 9 Marian Rose 4
3	Czechoslovakia	18	Antonín Kasper Sr. 6 Antonín Šváb Sr. 4 Luboš Tomíček Sr. 4 Jan Holub I 0
4	East Germany	5	Jürgen Hehlert 3 Bruno Bülau 1 Jochen Dinse 1 Peter Liebing 0

=== Scandinavian round ===
- 13 August
- (Denmark) Fredericia Speedway Stadium, Fredericia

Pos.	National team	Pts.	Riders
1	Sweden	44	Ove Fundin 12; Göte Nordin 12; Bengt Jansson 11; Bernt Persson 9
2	Denmark	24	Paul Wissing 10; Ole Olsen 6 Godtfred Andersen 4 Kurt Bogh 4 Borge Christiansen 0
3	Norway	18	Oyvind S. Berg 6 Jonny Faafeng 5 Per Aulie 4 Thorbjörn Nygaard 3 Niels Tontum 0
4	Finland	10	Kalevi Lahtinen 7 Matti Olin 2 Jouko Naskali 1 Olavi Turunen 0 Reijo Tolviander 0

- Great Britain (which included riders from Australia and New Zealand) were seeded to the final.

== World final ==
- September 1
- (Sweden) Malmö Stadion

Pos.	National team	Pts.	Riders
1st	Sweden	32	Göte Nordin – 11; Bengt Jansson – 9 Torbjörn Harrysson – 6 Ove Fundin – 6 Per Olof Söderman – dnr
2nd	Poland	26	Antoni Woryna – 10; Andrzej Wyglenda – 9 Jerzy Trzeszkowski – 4 Zbigniew Podlecki – 3 Andrzej Pogorzelski – 0
3rd	Great Britain	19	Barry Briggs – 8 Eric Boocock – 5 Ivan Mauger – 2 Ray Wilson – 4 Colin Pratt – 0
3rd	Soviet Union	19	Igor Plekhanov – 9 Viktor Trofimov – 4 Boris Samorodov – 3 Gabdrakhman Kadyrov 2 Farid Szajnurov 1

* Great Britain and Soviet Union equal 3rd place

== See also ==
- 1967 Individual Speedway World Championship
