= 1969 Speedway World Pairs Championship =

2nd edition of the World motorcycle speedway Pairs Championship

1969 World Pairs Championship

Seasons
- ← 1968 1970 →

The 1969 Speedway World Pairs Championship was the unofficial World Best Pairs Championship FIM. The final took place in Stockholm, Sweden. The championship was won by New Zealand (28 points) who beat Sweden (27 points) and England (21 points).

== Western Zone Semifinal ==
- (England) Wimbledon Stadium, London
- 14 August

Pos.	Team	Rider	Points
1st	England – 20+3	5.Nigel Boocock (2,3,2,3,3)	13+3
1st	England – 20+3	6.Trevor Hedge (3,2,1,1,f)	7
2nd	New Zealand – 20+2	9.Ivan Mauger (1,1,3,2,1)	8
2nd	New Zealand – 20+2	10.Ronnie Moore (2,3,2,3,2)	12+2
3rd	Denmark – 18	11.Ole Olsen (3,3,3,3,3)	15
3rd	Denmark – 18	12.Bent Nørregaard-Jensen (0,0,0,1,2)	3
4	Scotland – 13	7.Jim McMillan (0,2,3,2,3)	10
4	Scotland – 13	8.Ken McKinlay (1,0,0,x,2)	3
5	Australia – 10	1.Charlie Monk (2,2,1,0,0)	3
5	Australia – 10	2.Jim Airey (1,1,0,1,2)	5
6	Norway – 9	3.Reidar Eide (3,1,2,0,0)	6
6	Norway – 9	4.Øyvind S. Berg (0,0,1,1,1)	3

== European Semifinal ==
- (East Germany) Meissen Speedway Stadium, Meissen
- 31 August

Pos.	Team	Rider	Points
1st	Czechoslovakia – 23+3	Jan Holub I	15
1st	Czechoslovakia – 23+3	Zdeněk Majstr	8
2nd	East Germany – 23+2	Jochen Dinse	12
2nd	East Germany – 23+2	Gerhard Uhlenbrock	11
3rd	Bulgaria – 16	Petr Petkov	?
3rd	Bulgaria – 16	Petar Iliev	?
4	Yugoslavia – ?	?	?
4	Yugoslavia – ?	?	?
5	Hungary – ?	?	?
5	Hungary – ?	?	?
6	Romania – ?	?	?
6	Romania – ?	?	?

== Final ==
- (Sweden) Gubbängens IP, Stockholm
- 25 September

Placing	Pair / Rider Name	Total	1	2	3	4	5	6	7	8	9	10	11	12	13	14	15	16	17	18	19	20	21
1	New Zealand	28							10							20							28
1	(5) Ivan Mauger	18		3			3			3					3				3			3
1	(6) Bob Andrews	10		2			2			2					2				2			0
2	Sweden	27							10							20							27
2	(9) Ove Fundin	15			3			3				3		3			1					2
2	(10) Göte Nordin	12			2			2				2		2			3					1
3	England	21							10							14							21
3	(1) Nigel Boocock	11	3			3				1			2				0			2
3	(2) Martin Ashby	10	2			2				0			1				2			3
4	Denmark	15							5							9							15
4	(11) Ole Olsen	11			1				3				3		1			3					2
4	(12) Bent Nørregaard-Jensen	4			0				1				0		0			0					3
5	Czechoslovakia	12							2							4							12
5	(3) Jan Holub	8	1				1				1			1				1			3
5	(4) Zdeněk Majstr	4	0				0				0			T				2			2
6	East Germany	9							3							5							9
6	(13) Gerhard Uhlenbrock	8				1			2			F				1			3		1
6	(14) Jochen Dinse	1				E			0			1				0			F
7	Bulgaria	8							2							4							8
7	(7) Petr Petkov	6		1				1			1					1				2			0
7	(8) Petar Iliev	2		0				0			0					0				1			1
Placing	Pair / Rider Name	Total	1	2	3	4	5	6	7	8	9	10	11	12	13	14	15	16	17	18	19	20	21

m - exclusion for exceeding two minute time allowance • t - exclusion for touching the tapes • x - other exclusion • e - retired or mechanical failure • f - fell
ns - non-starter • nc - non-classify

gate A - inside	gate B	gate C	gate D - outside

== See also ==
- 1969 Individual Speedway World Championship
- 1969 Speedway World Team Cup
- motorcycle speedway
- 1969 in sports
