= German Individual Speedway Championship =

Annual German national speedway competition

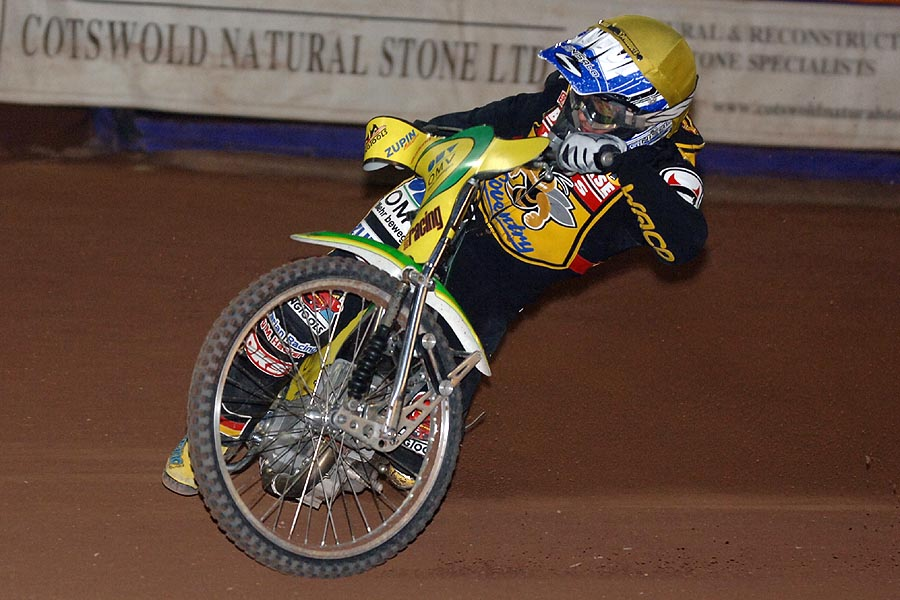
- Sport: Motorcycle speedway
- Founded: 1962
- Most titles: Martin Smolinski (pictured above) (8 times)

The German Individual Speedway Championship is a Motorcycle speedway championship held each year to determine the German national champion.

== History ==
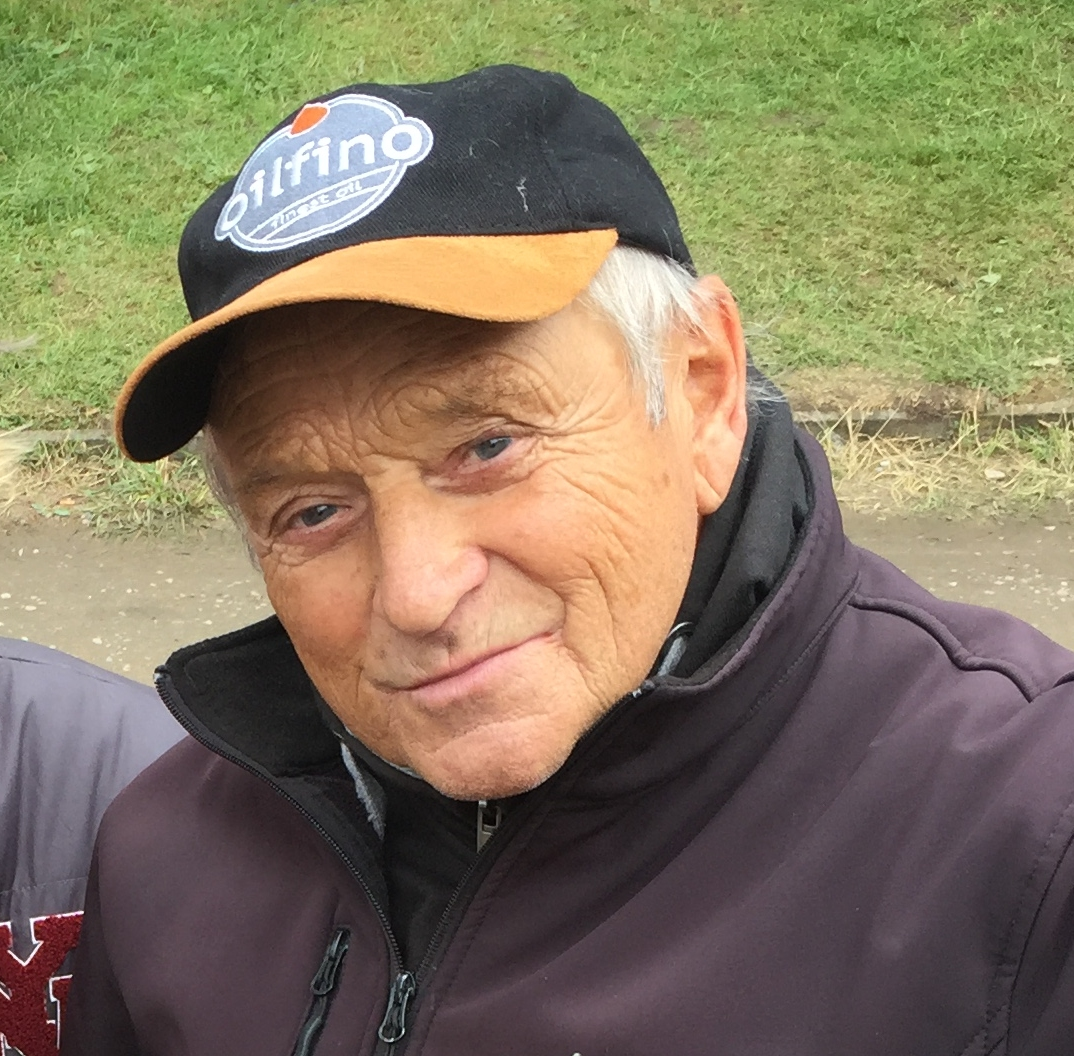
Egon Müller, first champion of West Germany and five times champion, pictured in 2018

Before the German reunification champions of West Germany and East Germany were declared. The first German champion was crowned in 1962, when Jürgen Hehlert won the East German Championship.

== Past winners ==
=== East Germany ===
Year	Winners	Runner-up	3rd place
1962	Jürgen Hehlert	Gunter Schelenz	Wolfgang Krug
1963	Jochen Dinse	Gunter Schelenz	Jurgen Rudolph
1964	Jochen Dinse	Gunter Schelenz	Hans Jürgen Fritz
1965	Jochen Dinse	Hans Jürgen Fritz	Jürgen Hehlert
1966	Jürgen Hehlert	Bruno Bulau	Gunter Schelenz
1967	Jochen Dinse	Peter Liebing	Jürgen Hehlert
1968	Jochen Dinse	Gerhard Uhlenbrock	Jürgen Hehlert
1969	Peter Liebing	Jochen Dinse	Gerhard Uhlenbrock
1970	Hans Jürgen Fritz	Jürgen Hehlert	Peter Liebing
1971	Hans Jürgen Fritz	Jürgen Hehlert	Jochen Dinse
1972	Hans Jürgen Fritz	Clemens Bever	Dieter Tetzlaff
1973	Jochen Dinse	Clemens Bever	Peter Liebing
1974	Dieter Tetzlaff	Hans Jürgen Fritz	Wilfried Schneider
1975	Clemens Bever	Dieter Tetzlaff	Rolf Perner
1976	Dieter Tetzlaff	Clemens Bever	Jochen Dinse
1977	Hartmut Ernst	Clemens Bever	Dieter Tetzlaff
1978	Dieter Tetzlaff	Werner Mell	Joachim Mell
1979	Dieter Tetzlaff	Dietmar Lieschke	Clemens Bever
1980	Dieter Tetzlaff	Diethelm Triemer	Dietmar Lieschke
1981	Diethelm Triemer	Clemens Bever	Dieter Tetzlaff
1982	Diethelm Triemer	Werner Mell	Dietmar Liechke
1983	Diethelm Triemer	Jurgen Schumann	Thomas Frobel
1984	Diethelm Triemer	Norbert Gummer	Thomas Frobel
1985	Diethelm Triemer	Ralf Peters	Herbert Mussehl
1986	Diethelm Triemer	Joachim Mell	Ralf Peters
1987	Diethelm Triemer	Herbert Mussehl	Ralf Peters
1988	Herbert Mussehl	Thomas Frobel	Diethelm Triemer
1989	Joachim Mell	Mike Ott	Ralf Peters
1990	Mike Ott	Thomas Diehr	Thomas Hopp
1991	Thomas Diehr	Herbert Mussehl	Frank Leonhardt

=== West Germany ===
Before 1979 the West German Individual Championship was only held on Grasstrack and/or Long track.

Year	Venue	Winner	Runner-up	3rd place
1979	Olching	Egon Müller	Georg Hack	Christian Brandt
1980	Norden	Georg Gilgenreiner	Egon Müller	Josef Aigner
1981	Pocking	Egon Müller	Karl Maier	Georg Hack
1982	Bremen	Josef Aigner	Egon Müller	Georg Hack
1983	Landshut	Egon Müller	Karl Maier	Stefan Deser
1984	Diedenbergen	Egon Müller	Klaus Lausch	Karl Maier
1985	Landshut	Egon Müller	Klaus Lausch	Gerd Riss
1986	Neuenknick	Gerd Riss	Klaus Lausch	Karl Maier
1987	Pocking	Tommy Dunker	Gerd Riss	Karl Maier
1988	Brokstedt	Klaus Lausch	Tommy Dunker	Karl Maier
1989	Norden	Klaus Lausch	Andre Pollehn	Tommy Dunker
1990	Neustadt	Klaus Lausch	Tommy Dunker	Andre Pollehn

=== Germany ===
Post 1990

Year	Venue	Winners	Runner-up	3rd place	Ref
1991	5 rounds	Zoltán Adorján (Hungary)	Gerd Riss	Klaus Lausch	
1992	Norden	Gerd Riss	Robert Barth	Jörg Pingel	
1993	Neubrandenburg	Marvyn Cox (United Kingdom)	Gerd Riss	Mike Ott	
1994	Ludwigslust	Gerd Riss	Marvyn Cox (United Kingdom)	Andre Pollehn	
1995	Meissen	Marvyn Cox (United Kingdom)	Gerd Riss	Robert Barth	
1996	Stralsund	Gerd Riss	Robert Barth	Robbie Kessler	
1997	Brokstedt	Todd Wiltshire (Australia)	Matthias Kröger	Robbie Kessler	
1998	Güstrow	Todd Wiltshire (Australia)	Steffen Mell	Aleš Dryml (Czech Republic)	
1999	Olching	Mirko Wolter	Gerd Riss	Robert Barth	
2000	Brokstedt	Robert Barth	Matthias Kröger	Lukas Dryml (Czech Republic)	
2001	Stralsund	Robert Barth	Aleš Dryml (Czech Republic)	Mirko Wolter	
2002	Norden	Mirko Wolter	Robbie Kessler	Martin Smolinski	
2003	Landshut	Mathias Schultz	Matthias Kröger	Christian Hefenbrock	
2004	3 rounds	Mirko Wolter	Mathias Schultz	Christian Hefenbrock	
2005	Brokstedt	Mathias Schultz	Christian Hefenbrock	Jörg Pingel	
2006	Herxheim	Christian Hefenbrock	Tobias Kroner	Thomas Stange	
2007	Stralsund	Martin Smolinski	Mathias Schultz	Tobias Kroner	
2008	Diedenbergen	Kevin Wölbert	Martin Smolinski	Richard Speiser	
2009	Landshut	Martin Smolinski	Christian Hefenbrock	Frank Facher	
2010	Brokstedt	Martin Smolinski	Tobias Kroner	Tobias Busch	
2011	Güstrow	Kevin Wölbert	Kai Huckenbeck	Martin Smolinski	
2012	Teterow	Tobias Kroner	Christian Hefenbrock	Kevin Wölbert	
2013	Berghaupten	Kai Huckenbeck	Mathias Schultz	Martin Smolinski	
2014	Brokstedt	Kai Huckenbeck	Martin Smolinski	Tobias Kroner	
2015	Wolfslake	Martin Smolinski	Kevin Wölbert	Tobias Busch	
2016	Stralsund	Martin Smolinski	Kevin Wölbert	Mathias Schultz	
2017	Olching	Kai Huckenbeck	Kevin Wölbert	Max Dilger	
2018	Güstrow	Martin Smolinski	Kai Huckenbeck	Erik Riss	
2019	Abensberg	Martin Smolinski	Erik Riss	Kevin Wölbert	
2020	cancelled due to COVID-19 pandemic				
2021	Stralsund	Martin Smolinski	Kai Huckenbeck	Norick Blödorn	
2022	Herxheim	Norick Blödorn	Kevin Wölbert	René Deddens	
2023	Güstrow	Kevin Wölbert	Valentin Grobauer	Marius Hillebrand	
2024	Pocking	Erik Riss	Kevin Wölbert	Patrick Hyek	
2025	4 rounds	Norick Blödorn	Kevin Wölbert	Valentin Grobauer	

== See also ==
- German Team Speedway Championship
- Germany national speedway team
- East Germany national speedway team
- West Germany national speedway team
