= Güstrow Speedway Stadium =

Stadium in Güstrow, Germany

- Location: Plauer Chaussee 4, 18273 Güstrow, Germany
- Coordinates: 53°47′10″N 12°12′17″E
- Capacity: 8,000
- Opened: 20 October 1963
- Length: 0.298 km (0.185 mi)

The Güstrow Speedway Stadium (German: Speedwaystadion Güstrow) is an 8,000-capacity speedway stadium in Güstrow, Germany. The stadium is located on the eastern outskirts of the town, just off the Plauer Chaussee 4.

The speedway track has a circumference of 298 metres and is home to the speedway team MC Güstrow.

== History ==
In 1963, Fritz Suhrbier was attributed as to creating the stadium from an old sand and waste area. He constructed a motocross course with a speedway track inside the motocross course. Diethelm Triemer, an East German international rider, officiated at the first race on 20 October 1963.

in 1970, the stadium hosted a Continental Semi final of the 1970 Speedway World Team Cup.

Being in East Germany the stadium suffered from political isolation because of the Iron Curtain but many years later in 2008, it was selected to host the semi final of the Team Speedway Junior European Championship.

Piotr Protasiewicz set a track record time of 56.5 seconds on 12 August 2007.

From 2014 to 2019, the stadium hosted one of the finals of the Individual Speedway European Championship. It did not hold the event in 2020 due to the COVID-19 pandemic. However, it returned in 2021 and been held every year since.
