= Zdeněk Majstr =

Czech speedway rider

- Born: 11 February 1948 (age 78); Most, Czechoslovakia
- Nationality: Czech

Individual honours
- 1973: World Longtrack finalist

Team honours
- 1969: World Pairs finalist
- 1970: World Team Cup finalist

Zdeněk Majstr (born 11 February 1948) is a Czech former speedway rider.

== Early life ==
Majstr was born on 11 February 1948 in Most. In 1953, his family moved to Slaný. He trained as an agricultural machinery repairman at the secondary vocational school in Slaný.

== Speedway career ==
Majstr partnered Jan Holub I to the World Pairs final at the 1969 Speedway World Pairs Championship. He was also part of the Czechoslovak team that reached the final of the 1970 Speedway World Team Cup.

Like many Czech riders of the time, the Czechsolovak authorities rarely allowed riders to compete for British league teams but they did allow sides such as Young Czechoslovakia to tour the United Kingdom, which allowed Majstr to race in Britain in 1969 and 1970.

Majstr reached the final of the Continental Speedway final in 1970, as part of the 1970 Individual Speedway World Championship.

== World Final appearances ==
=== World Pairs Championship ===
- 1969 - (Sweden) Stockholm (with Jan Holub I) - 5th - 12pts (4)

=== World Team Cup ===
- 1970 - (England) London, Wembley Stadium (with Jan Holub I / Jiří Štancl / Miloslav Verner / Václav Verner) - 4th

=== World Longtrack Championship ===
- 1973 - (Norway) Oslo (13th) 3pts
