= Bengt Jansson =

Swedish speedway rider (born 1943)

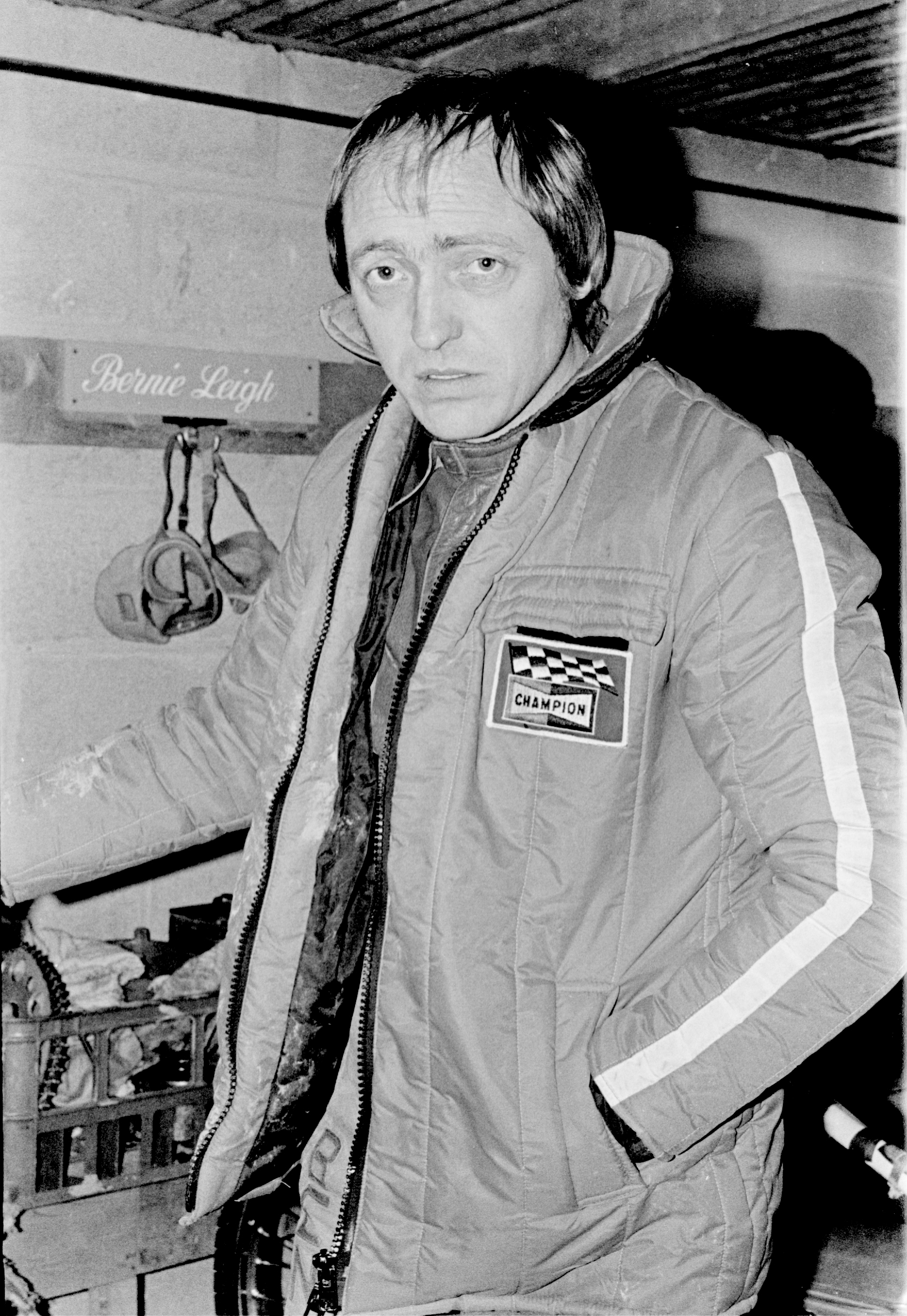
- Born: 9 January 1943 (age 83); Stockholm, Sweden
- Nickname: Benga, Banger
- Nationality: Swedish

Career history

Sweden
- 1960–1969: Getingarna
- 1970–1972: Kaparna
- 1973–1978: Smederna
- 1979–1982: Skepparna
- 1983–1989: Rospiggarna

Great Britain
- 1964: West Ham Hammers
- 1966: Edinburgh Monarchs
- 1967–1973: Hackney Hawks
- 1975, 1977: Reading Racers
- 1978: Birmingham Brummies

Individual honours
- 1972: Nordic Champion
- 1971: London Riders' Champion

Team honours
- 1967, 1970: World Team Cup Winner
- 1971: British League KO Cup Winner
- 1963, 1964, 1965, 1966, 1967, 1969, 1970, 1973, 1977: Allsvenskan Champion
- 1962, 1979: Allsvenskan Div 2 Champion
- 1988: Division 1 Champion
- 1966, 1967: Swedish Pairs Champion
- 1971, 1973: London Cup
- 1977: Spring Gold Cup

Bengt Gustaf Jansson (born 9 January 1943 in Stockholm, Sweden) is a former international motorcycle speedway rider from Sweden. He earned 107 caps for the Sweden national speedway team.

== Career ==
Jansson was runner up in the 1967 World Final to fellow countryman Ove Fundin after losing a race-off and finished third in 1971, again after a run-off.

Jansson rode in Britain for West Ham Hammers, Edinburgh Monarchs, Hackney Hawks, Reading Racers, and finally the Birmingham Brummies. It was as a Hackney rider he won the 1971 London Riders' Championship.

Jansson joined Reading Racers in 1975.

== World final appearances ==
=== Individual World Championship ===
- 1965 - (England) London, Wembley Stadium - 4th - 10pts
- 1967 - (England) London, Wembley Stadium - 2nd - 14pts + 2pts
- 1968 - (Sweden) Gothenburg, Ullevi - Reserve - did not ride
- 1971 - (Sweden) Gothenburg, Ullevi - 3rd - 12pts + 2pts
- 1974 - (Sweden) Gothenburg, Ullevi - 5th - 9pts
- 1977 - (Sweden) Gothenburg, Ullevi - 6th - 9pts

=== World Pairs Championship ===
- 1970 - (Sweden) Malmö, Malmö Stadion (with Ove Fundin) - 2nd - 25pts (10)
- 1972 - (Sweden) Borås, Ryavallen (with Anders Michanek) - 4th - 22pts (7)
- 1976 - (Sweden) Eskilstuna, Snälltorpet (with Bernt Persson) - 3rd - 22pts (11)

=== World Team Cup ===
- 1965 - (West Germany) Kempten, Illerstadion (with Björn Knutson / Ove Fundin / Göte Nordin) - 2nd - 33pts (8)
- 1967 - (Sweden) Malmö, Malmö Stadion (with Ove Fundin / Göte Nordin / Torbjörn Harrysson) - Winner - 32pts (9)
- 1968 - (England) London, Wembley Stadium (with Ove Fundin / Anders Michanek / Olle Nygren / Torbjörn Harrysson) - 2nd - 30pts (7)
- 1969 - (Poland) Rybnik, Rybnik Municipal Stadium (with Sören Sjösten / Ove Fundin / Anders Michanek / Torbjörn Harrysson) - 4th - 12pts (1)
- 1970 - (England) London, Wembley Stadium (with Ove Fundin / Anders Michanek / Sören Sjösten) - Winner - 42pts (11)
- 1971 - (Poland) Wrocław, Olympic Stadium (with Anders Michanek / Bernt Persson / Sören Sjöstenn / Leif Enecrona) - 4th - 18pts
- 1973 - (England) London, Wembley Stadium (with Anders Michanek / Bernt Persson / Tommy Jansson) - 2nd - 31pts (6)
- 1976 - (England) London, White City Stadium (with Anders Michanek / Bernt Persson / Lars-Åke Andersson / Christer Löfqvist) - 3rd - 26pts (1)
- 1977 - (Poland) Wrocław, Olympic Stadium (with Anders Michanek / Tommy Nilsson / Bernt Persson / Sören Karlsson) - 4th - 11pts (2)
