= Giovanni Pizzo =

Italian artist (1934–2022)

- Born: 1934; Veroli
- Died: 2022 (aged 87–88); Rome
- Movement: Arte programmata, Op art
- Spouse: Lucia di Luciano

Giovanni Pizzo (Veroli, 1934 – Rome, 2022) was an Italian artist and one of the representatives of the Arte programmata movement. His work intersected with scientific methodologies, emphasizing logical-mathematical processes and visual perception.For Pizzo, art was a form of research conducted through systematic, programmed processes, which he initially developed in notebooks before transferring them to canvas. Today, his approach to merging art, science, and technology is referenced in discussions about the history of computers and digital art.

Together with his wife and fellow artist Lucia di Luciano, Pizzo participated in the Nove Tendencije 3 exhibition in 1965, in Zagreb, Croatia. He participated in VIII Quadriennale d’Arte di Roma (1960), Esposizione Universale di Montreal (1968), VI Biennale Romana (1968), Biennale Internazionale di Barcellona (1992), etc.

== Early life and education ==
Pizzo studied at the Academy of Fine Arts and the French Academy in Rome, where he developed a structured approach to art, influenced by geometric principles and logical processes. He held his first solo exhibition at La Fontanina Gallery in Syracuse in 1958. In 1956, he married Lucia di Luciano, who later became his artistic collaborator.

== Gruppo 63 and Operativo R ==
In 1963, Pizzo and di Luciano, in collaboration with Lia Drei and Francesco Guerrieri, co-founded Gruppo 63 - an avant-garde art collective that sought to fuse art, architecture, and scientific research. The group exhibited in Rome, Florence, and Livorno, but broke up later that year due to internal conflicts.

After the group's dissolution, Pizzo and di Luciano, along with Carlo Carchietti, Franco Di Vito, and Mario Rulli, formed Operativo R. Their manifesto, the "Theory of Operationalism", published in Marcatré, established their approach to creating art through systematic, logical-mathematical processes. Despite their goals, Operativo R eventually disbanded due to differing views, prompting Pizzo to refine his individual approach to programmed art.

== Arte Programmata ==
The 1960s were a time of profound cultural and artistic transformation, characterized by the emergence of movements such as Kinetic Art, Minimalism, and Pop Art. During this period, Arte Programmata arose in Italy as a movement that aimed to integrate art and technology. Known as "programmed art," it emphasized a structured and methodical approach to artistic creation, grounded in logical and mathematical principles. Pizzo and di Luciano actively participated in the movement when they exhibited at the Nove Tendencije 3 exhibition (1965). Their involvement was beneficial for the development and recognition of Arte Programmata, and helped to position their work within a broader context of contemporary artistic exploration.

In 1966, they presented individual installations at Galleria Numero in Rome, supported by a sound environment composed by Pietro Grossi. Art critics including Giulio Carlo Argan, Umbro Appolonio, Lea Vergine, Palma Bucarelli and Giancarlo Politi recognized their exploration of the intersection between scientific reasoning and visual perception.

Pizzo and di Luciano's objective of making the operational processes behind their art visually accessible brought them to foster an educational dialogue connecting scientific logic with aesthetic experience, ultimately creating a "metalanguage" that enabled viewers to engage with the underlying structures and meanings of their visual compositions.

=== Operationalism and Visual Perception ===
"Operationalism", a concept articulated by Percy W. Bridgman in 1926, emphasizes that ideas are defined by the operations associated with them. For Pizzo, the operational process leading to the form was more fundamental than the form itself, embodying the principles of operationalism and aiming to establish an interaction between art and cognition.

Pizzo's artistic exploration unfolded through various phases, each consisting of operational steps that facilitate the movement of images across space and time. Each phase was first documented in his notebooks and featured a distinct perceptual quality designed to enhance viewer engagement through logical and mathematical planning, allowing for precise control over aesthetic operations. He used Morgan's Paint (acrylic) and Indian ink to achieve distinct color variations on canvas. Ultimately, visual perception was shaped by the position and function of elements within the overall structure.

=== Sign Gestalt ===
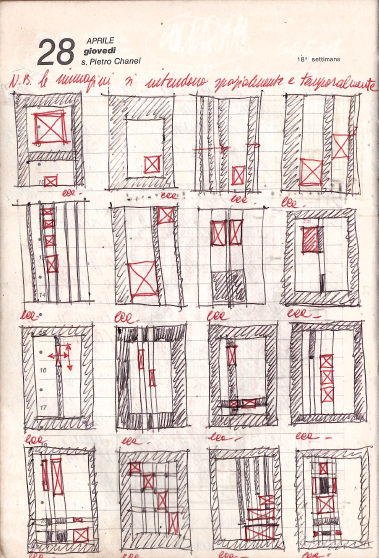
Giovanni Pizzo's notebook page, 1977

Giovanni Pizzo was using the combinatory method to generate his works, primarily titled "Sign Gestalt". These works explore the gestalt possibilities inherent in modules, phase structures, geometric forms, and mathematical concepts. Each piece features arrangements that demonstrate various potentials of visual elements. The positioning of these elements changes, creating dynamic interactions between visual components and color.

== Contribution and Legacy ==
In addition to his artistic endeavors, Pizzo co-founded the Spazio Documento cultural association, which has been active since 1981. Similar to his wife, he is currently experiencing a resurgence in interest, leading to increased attention from critics and collectors. This re-emergence highlights their contributions to the art world and prompts discussions about the relevance of their approaches within contemporary artistic practices.

== Solo Exhibitions (selection) ==
- 2024: GIOVANNI PIZZO. Works from the 60s to 2022, 10 A.M. ART Gallery, Milano; Lucia Di Luciano, Giovanni Pizzo: Arte Programmata - NFT's Point Zero, Ras Al Khaimah Art, Ras Al Khaimah (UAE)
- 2023: Giovanni Pizzo: Sign Gestalt. Riquadrare la storia, Sala 1, Rome
- 2022: Lucia Di Luciano & Giovanni Pizzo. Programirana umjetnost, “Josip Račić” Studio of the National Museum of Modern Art, Zagreb; Lucia di Luciano, Giovanni Pizzo – Programirana umjetnost 1964. – 1977, Kolekcija Marinko Sudac, Varaždin City Museum, Varaždin
- 2015: Sistematiche Operazionali, Galleria 10 A.M. ART, Milan; Sistematiche Operazionali, Spectra Konkret, Graz
- 2013: Sign Gestalt 1961 - 1970, Montrasio Arte, Milan
- 2007: Combinatorie, Arte Programmata anni ’60, Galleria Nazionale d’Arte Moderna, Rome
- 2004: Contrappunti, Galleria 8+1, Venice – Mestre
- 2002: Giovanni Pizzo, MLAC, Museo Laboratorio di Arte Contemporanea - Università "La Sapienza", Rome
- 1993: Alternanze Cromatiche, Galleria l’Ariete, Rome; Giovanni Pizzo, Studio d’informazione Estetica Concreto, Calasetta
- 1986: Giovanni Pizzo, Galleria Arte Struktura, Milan
- 1985: Poetica del Colore nelle Strutture Combinatorie, Centro Culturale Spaziodocumento, Rome
- 1976: Giovanni Pizzo, Galleria Disque Rouge, Bruxelles
- 1966: Per una Ricerca Estetico - Operazionale come Metalinguaggio, Galleria Numero, Rome and Florence
- 1965: Per una Scelta Operativa, Galleria Numero, Rome
- 1958: Galleria la Fontanina, Syracuse

== Collections ==
Works by Giovanni Pizzo are held in the following collections:

- Galleria Nazionale d'Arte Moderna (GNAM), Rome
- Museo d'Arte Moderna e Contemporanea di Trento e Rovereto, Rovereto
- Museo de Arte Contemporáneo de Buenos Aires (MACBA), Buenos Aires
- 10 A.M. ART Gallery, Milan
- Avantgarde Gallery, Zagreb
