= Barry Briggs =

New Zealand speedway rider (born 1934)

Barry Briggs MBE
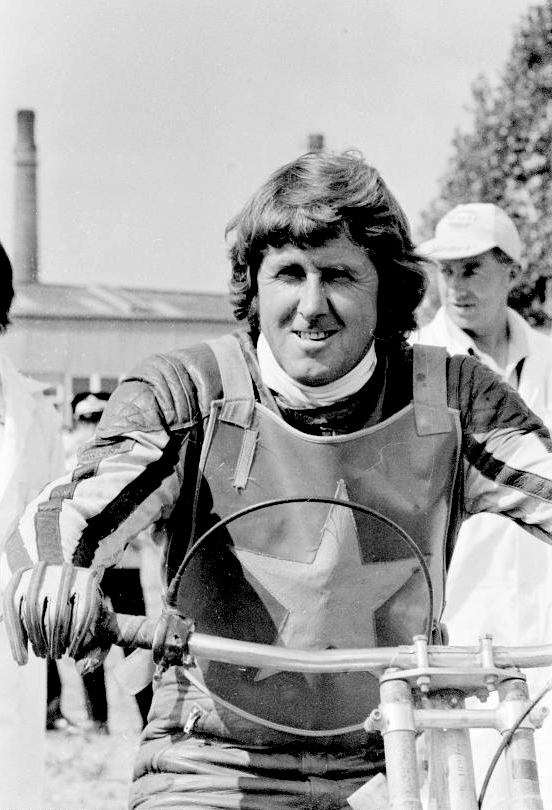
- Born: 30 December 1934 (age 91); Christchurch, New Zealand
- Nationality: New Zealander

Career history
- 1952–1959, 1974-1975: Wimbledon Dons
- 1960: New Cross Rangers
- 1961–1963: Southampton Saints
- 1964–1972: Swindon Robins
- 1976: Hull Vikings

Individual honours
- 1957, 1958, 1964, 1966: World Champion
- 1959, 1963: New Zealand Champion
- 1961, 1964, 1965, 1966, 1967, 1969: British Champion
- 1965, 1966, 1967, 1968, 1969, 1970: British League Riders Champion
- 1955: London Riders' Champion
- 1958: Southern Riders' Champion
- 1964, 1966, 1967, 1970: Midland Riders' Champion
- 1967: Scottish Open Champion
- 1958, 1961, 1965: Pride of the Midlands winner
- 1960, 1963, 1964: Pride of the South winner
- 1961, 1963, 1965: The Laurels
- 1966: Olympique
- 1964: Internationale

Team honours
- 1968, 1971: World Team Cup
- 1954, 1955, 1956, 1958, 1962: National League Champion
- 1967: British League Champion
- 1961: National League KO Cup Winner
- 1953, 1956, 1961: National Trophy Winner
- 1967, 1968: Midland Cup Winner
- 1974: London Cup Winner
- 1954: RAC Cup Winner

Barry Briggs MBE (born 30 December 1934) is a New Zealand former speedway rider.

== Career ==
Briggs won the World Individual Championship title four times: in 1957, 1958, 1964 and 1966. He appeared in a record 17 consecutive World Individual finals (1954–70), and a record 18 in all, during which he scored a record 201 points. He also won the London Riders' Championship in 1955 whilst riding for the Wimbledon Dons. He is also a six-time winner of the British Championship. He won the first final in 1961 and then dominated the sixties titles by winning in 1964, 1965, 1966, 1967, and 1969. Briggs also twice won his home title, the New Zealand Championship, winning in 1959 and again in 1963.

Briggs also created a domestic record by winning the British League Riders Championship for six consecutive years from 1965 to 1970, representing the Swindon Robins.

Briggs retired from British league racing in 1972 after an accident during Heat 5 of the World Final at Wembley Stadium with Swedish rider Bernt Persson. As a result of the accident, Briggs lost the index finger of his left hand, but returned in 1974, then announcing in 1975 that this would be his last season but actually returning for another year with Hull Vikings, retiring for a final time in 1976.

During the early to mid-1970s, Briggs was one of a number of World Champion riders (along with fellow kiwi Ivan Mauger and Denmark's Ole Olsen) as well as a number of others such as Edward Jancarz and Zenon Plech from Poland and England's Chris Pusey, who embarked on world tours to Australia, his native New Zealand and the USA. Their trips to the US, primarily the Costa Mesa Speedway in Los Angeles, helped spark the American motorcycle speedway scene which had been dormant on the world stage since the pre-World War II days of 1937 World Champion Jack Milne, his brother Cordy Milne and Wilbur Lamoreaux.

== After retirement ==
In 1973, Briggs was awarded an MBE for his services to sport and in 1990 he was inducted into the New Zealand Sports Hall of Fame. From 17 March 2010, Briggs took part in a John o' Groats to Land's End bike ride to raise money for the BBC's Sport Relief.

In retirement, Briggs became the mentor to many young riders who went on to race in World Finals including fellow Kiwi Mitch Shirra. He also lent his voice to television, becoming a speedway commentator in the United Kingdom, Europe and the United States of America.

== World final appearances ==
=== Individual World Championship ===
- 1954 – (England) London, Wembley Stadium – 6th – 9pts
- 1955 – (England) London, Wembley Stadium – 3rd – 12+2pts
- 1956 – (England) London, Wembley Stadium – 7th – 10pts
- 1957 – (England) London, Wembley Stadium – Winner – 14pts + 3pts
- 1958 – (England) London, Wembley Stadium – Winner – 15pts
- 1959 – (England) London, Wembley Stadium – 3rd – 11+3pts
- 1960 – (England) London, Wembley Stadium – 6th – 9pts
- 1961 – (Sweden) Malmö, Malmö Stadion – 4th – 12pts + 1pt
- 1962 – (England) London, Wembley Stadium – 2nd – 13pts
- 1963 – (England) London, Wembley Stadium – 3rd – 12pts
- 1964 – (Sweden) Gothenburg, Ullevi – Winner – 15pts
- 1965 – (England) London, Wembley Stadium – 4th – 10pts
- 1966 – (Sweden) Gothenburg, Ullevi – Winner – 15pts
- 1967 – (England) London, Wembley Stadium – 5th – 11pts
- 1968 – (Sweden) Gothenburg, Ullevi – 2nd – 12pts
- 1969 – (England) London, Wembley Stadium – 2nd – 11pts + 3pts
- 1970 – (Poland) Wrocław, Olympic Stadium – 7th – 7pts
- 1972 – (England) London, Wembley Stadium – 14th – 3pts

=== World Pairs Championship ===
- 1971 – (Poland) Rybnik, Rybnik Municipal Stadium (with Ivan Mauger) – 2nd – 25pts (13)
- 1974 – (England) Manchester, Hyde Road (with Ivan Mauger) – 3rd – 21pts (4)
- 1976 – (Sweden) Eskilstuna, Eskilstuna Motorstadion (with Ivan Mauger) – 5th – 15pts (7)

=== World Team Cup ===
- 1962 – (Czechoslovakia) Slaný (with Ronnie Moore / Peter Craven / Ron How / Cyril Maidment) – 2nd – 24pts (8)
- 1963 – (Austria) Vienna, Stadion Wien (with Peter Craven / Dick Fisher / Peter Moore) – 3rd – 25pts (12)
- 1964 – (West Germany) Abensberg, Abensberg Stadion (with Ron How / Ken McKinlay / Nigel Boocock / Brian Brett) – 3rd – 21pts (9)
- 1965 – (West Germany) Kempten (with Charlie Monk / Nigel Boocock / Ken McKinlay / Jimmy Gooch) – 3rd – 18pts (1)
- 1966 – (Poland) Wrocław, Olympic Stadium (with Nigel Boocock / Terry Betts / Ivan Mauger / Colin Pratt) – 4th – 8pts (1)
- 1967 – (Sweden) Malmö, Malmö Stadion (with Ray Wilson / Eric Boocock / Ivan Mauger / Colin Pratt) – 3rd= – 19pts (8)
- 1968 – (England) London, Wembley Stadium (with Ivan Mauger / Nigel Boocock / Martin Ashby / Norman Hunter) – Winner – 40pts (7)
- 1969 – (Poland) Rybnik, Rybnik Municipal Stadium (with Martin Ashby / Nigel Boocock / Ivan Mauger) – 2nd – 27pts (8)
- 1970 – (England) London, Wembley Stadium (with Ivan Mauger / Nigel Boocock / Eric Boocock / Ray Wilson) – 2nd – 31pts (11)
- 1971 – (Poland) Wroclaw, Olympic Stadium (with Jim Airey / Ray Wilson / Ivan Mauger / Ronnie Moore) – Winner – 37pts (6)

Note: Briggs rode for Great Britain in the World Team Cup from 1962

=== World Longtrack Final ===
- 1971 – (Norway) Oslo (6th) 10pts
- 1975 – (Socialist Federal Republic of Yugoslavia) Radgona (4th) 19pts
- 1976 – (Czech Republic) Mariánské Lázně (11th) 7pts
