= Gerhard Uhlenbrock =

British motorcycle speedway rider

- Born: 5 May 1941 (age 85); Rostock, Germany
- Nationality: German

Career history

East Germany
- 1967: Rostock

Great Britain
- 1973: Coventry Bees

Individual honours
- 1968: East German championship silver
- 1969: East German championship bronze

Gerhard Uhlenbrock (born 5 May 1941) is a former motorcycle speedway rider from East Germany. He earned eight international caps for the East German national speedway team. He later defected and rode for the West German national speedway team.

== Biography ==
Uhlenbrock, born in Rostock, represented his country at the Speedway World Cup on four occasions, in 1966, 1968, 1969 and 1970.

In addition to the World Cup, Uhlenbrock reached the final of the 1969 Speedway World Pairs Championship, where he rode with Jochen Dinse, finishing sixth at the Gubbängens IP in Sweden.

Uhlenbrock won silver and bronze medals in the East German championship in 1968 and 1969 respectively.

In the British leagues, Uhlenbrock's career was restricted to just one season, riding for Coventry Bees during the 1973 British League season, where he posted a disappointing 2.53 league average for the season and suffered four broken ribs in a crash at Leicester Stadium.

After he defected, Uhlenbrock rode for the West German national team during the 1974 Speedway World Pairs Championship.
