= East Germany national speedway team =

East Germany national motorcycle speedway team

East Germany
- SWC Wins: 0

The East Germany national speedway team were one of the teams that competed in international team motorcycle speedway.

== History ==
The East German speedway team competed in the second edition of the Speedway World Team Cup in 1961, finishing fourth in the East European Round. This was one year after the West German team, who competed at the inaugural Speedway World Team Cup in 1960.

East Germany would contest the every World Cup until 1972 but as one of the smaller speedway nations failed to progress to the later rounds.

In 1969, East Germany reached the final of the Speedway World Pairs Championship.

The team became part of the Germany national speedway team in 1991, following the events that led to the German reunification between 1989 and 1991.

== Major tournament finals ==
=== World Pairs Championship ===
Year	Venue	Standings (Pts)	Riders	Pts
1969	(Sweden); Stockholm; Gubbängens IP	1. New Zealand (28); 2. Sweden (27); 3. England (21); 4. Denmark (15); 5. Czechoslovakia (12); 6. East Germany (9); 7. Bulgaria (9)	Gerhard Uhlenbrock	8
1969	(Sweden); Stockholm; Gubbängens IP	1. New Zealand (28); 2. Sweden (27); 3. England (21); 4. Denmark (15); 5. Czechoslovakia (12); 6. East Germany (9); 7. Bulgaria (9)	Jochen Dinse	1

== International caps ==
Caps limited to East Germany only (West Germany and unified Germany not included).

Rider	Caps
Beckmeyer, Matthias	
Bever, Clemens	
Bocke, Andreas	
Bülau, Bruno	
Busch, Mario	
Diehr, Thomas	
Dinse, Jochen	
Engel, Thomas	
Ernst, Hartmut	
Frenzel, Walter	
Fritz, Hans Jürgen	
Fröbel, Thomas	
Gümmer, Norbert	
Gunther, Wilhelm	
Hegenbarth, Mathias	
Hehlert, Jürgen	
Hehlert, Peter	
Hey, Olaf	
Hopp, Thomas	
Jenning, Mike	
Koch, Thomas	
Kohl, Josef	
Lagoda, Tom	
Liebing, Peter	
Lieschk, Dietmar	
Mell, Joachim	
Mell, Werner	
Miessner, Bodo	
Mussehl, Herbert	
Nicolas, Bernhard	
Niemann, Heino	
Ott, Mike	
Peters, Ralf	
Raschke, Jürgen	
Rudolph, Jürgen	
Sass, Roland	
Schelenz, Gunther	
Schneider, Wilfried	
Schumann, Jürgen	
Suchland, Helmut	
Tetzlaff, Dieter	
Triemer, Diethlem	
Uhlenbrock, Gerhard	8

== See also ==
- German Individual Speedway Championship
- German Speedway Championship
- Germany national speedway team
- West Germany national speedway team
