= Peter Liebing =

British motorcycle speedway rider

- Born: 12 February 1939 (age 87); Meissen, East Germany
- Nationality: German

Career history

East Germany
- 1967: Meissen

Individual honours
- 1969: East German champion
- 1967: East German championship silver
- 1970, 1973: East German championship bronze

Peter Liebing (born 12 February 1939) is a former motorcycle speedway rider from East Germany. He earned international caps for the East German national speedway team and was the champion of East Germany in 1969.

== Biography ==
Liebing, born in Meissen, represented his country at the Speedway World Cup on three occasions, in 1969, 1970 and 1971.

Liebing became the champion of East Germany in 1969 and also won silver (1967) and bronze medals (1970 and 1973) in the East German championship.

Liebing also competed in ice speedway, reaching the finals of the 1966 Individual Ice Speedway World Championship and 1968 Individual Ice Speedway World Championship.
