= Bulgaria national speedway team =

Bulgarian national motorcycle speedway team

Bulgaria
- SWC wins: 0

The Bulgaria national speedway team were one of the teams that competed in international team motorcycle speedway.

== History ==
The Bulgarian speedway team first competed at the Speedway World Team Cup during its second edition, finishing fourth in the Central European round at the 1961 Speedway World Team Cup. From 1961, the team competed in almost every World Team Cup until 1992, when the team began to struggle to field a competitive team.

Since 2001, when the competition was rebranded the Speedway World Cup the team have not competed at the World Cup and have only appeared once in international fixtures during 2010. As of 2017, the sport was almost dormant, with only one track in Shumen, although there were ten others in a derelict state.

The greatest achievement of the team was reaching the final of the Speedway World Pairs Championship in 1969.

== Major tournament finals ==
=== World Pairs Championship ===
Year	Venue	Standings (Pts)	Riders	Pts
1969	(Sweden); Stockholm; Gubbängens IP	1. New Zealand (28); 2. Sweden (27); 3. England (21); 4. Denmark (15); 5. (Czech Republic) Czechoslovakia (12); 6. East Germany (9); 7. Bulgaria (9)	Petr Petkov	6
1969	(Sweden); Stockholm; Gubbängens IP	1. New Zealand (28); 2. Sweden (27); 3. England (21); 4. Denmark (15); 5. (Czech Republic) Czechoslovakia (12); 6. East Germany (9); 7. Bulgaria (9)	Petar Iliev	2

== International caps ==
Since the advent of the Speedway Grand Prix era, international caps earned by riders is largely restricted to international competitions, whereas previously test matches between two teams were a regular occurrence.

Rider	Caps
Grigory Adarov	
Plamen Aleksandrov	
Alexej Antonov	
Dimitri Bajev	
Nikolai Cvetkov	
Boris Damjanov	
Ivan Dupalov	
Angel Eftimov	
Petar Iliev	
Zdravko Iordanov	
Atanasz Janakiev	
Orlin Janakiev	
Zacharia Jordanov	
Alexander Kostov	
Deter Kostov	
Peter Kostov	
Simeon Lukanov	
Gavril Macev	
Georgi Macev	
Milen Manev	
Nikolai Manev	
Ivan Marenov	
Veselin Markov	
Nedelko Nedelkov	
Nikolai Parvanov	
Milko Pejkov	
Petr Petkov	
Georgi Petranov	
Christov Simeonov	
Krasimir Sokolov	
Aleksander Stojanov	
Todor Stojanov	
Atanas Stojanov	
Stanislav Tzankov	
Rudolf Valentinov	
Galio Velickov	
Zachari Zachariev	

== See also ==
- Speedway in Bulgaria
