= Leningrad Speedway Stadium =

Former stadium in Saint Petersburg, Russia

- Location: Prospekt Toreza, 71 А, Мототрек, Saint Petersburg, Russia, 194223
- Coordinates: 60°01′32″N 30°19′53″E
- Opened: 1963

Leningrad Speedway Stadium was a former motorcycle speedway in Saint Petersburg. It was located north of the centre of the city, adjacent west of the Sosnovka Park, off the Ulitsa Vitkovskogo road. Today it is a site for motorcycle training and motorcycle trials riding.

== History ==
The stadium opened in 1963 and hosted a series of major motorcycle speedway events. It was the venue for the Continental final of the 1969 Speedway World Team Cup. Further Speedway World Cup rounds were held in 1971, 1978 and 1981.

The stadium also hosted significant stages of the Speedway World Championship in 1970, 1973, 1975 and 1976 and the final of the Speedway Under-21 World Championship in 1979.

The stadium remained active throughout the 1980s and 1990s but became in need of renovation before ceasing activities sometime during the 2000s. Igor Marko set the track record of 68.05 seconds on 16 July 2000 and the Neva Speedway team competed in the Finnish team championship during 2000 because the Russian championship did not take place.

The speedway club known as Neva Speedway remain active and have plans to return speedway to the stadium, which in principle is still able to host speedway if renovation takes place. Neva Leningrad (also known as Barricade Leningrad from 1978 to 1990) regularly participated in the Soviet Union Championship from its inaugural year of 1962 through to 1990. The team disbanded shortly before the city's change of name from Leningrad to Saint Petersburg and the dissolution of the Soviet Union. The team were twice champions of the Soviet Union, winning the title in 1966 and 1971.
