= Diethelm Triemer =

East German speedway rider

- Born: 23 July 1954 (age 72); Woltersdorf, East Germany
- Nationality: German

Career history

East Germany
- 1984: Güstrow

Individual honours
- 1981, 1982, 1983, 1984, 1985, 1986, 1987: East German Champion

Diethelm Triemer (born 23 July 1954) is a former international speedway rider from East Germany.

== Speedway career ==
Triemer was a seven times champion of East Germany, winning the East German Championship for seven consecutive years from 1981 until 1987. He was also the East German Longtrack champion in 1980, 1982 and 1983.
