= Pavel Mareš (speedway rider) =

Czech speedway rider

- Born: 20 January 1943; Ústí nad Labem, Czechoslovakia
- Died: 4 June 2023 (aged 80)
- Nationality: Czech

Career history

Czechoslovakia
- 1964: Rudá Hvězda Praha

Individual honours
- 1965: Czechoslovak final silver medal

Team honours
- 1971: World Pairs finalist

Pavel Mareš (20 January 1943 – 4 June 2023) was a Czech speedway rider.

== Speedway career ==
Mareš won the silver medal in the 1965 Czechoslovak Individual Speedway Championship. He also partnered Václav Verner to the World Pairs final at the 1971 Speedway World Pairs Championship where they finished just outside the medals in fourth place behind winners Poland.

Mareš also raced in ice speedway and participated in the 1967 Individual Ice Speedway World Championship.

Like many Czech riders of the time, the Czechsolovak authorities rarely allowed riders to compete for British league teams, but they did allow club sides such as Prague to tour the United Kingdom, which allowed Mareš to race in Britain in 1967 and again in 1971. By 1974, he was a recognised name in speedway circles in the United Kingdom despite not being able to ride in the British leagues.

== World Final appearances ==
=== World Pairs Championship ===
- 1971 – (Poland) Rybnik, Rybnik Municipal Stadium (with Václav Verner) – 4th – 17pts (8)
