= Dieter Tetzlaff =

East German speedway rider

- Born: 13 January 1944 (age 82); Germany
- Nationality: German

Career history

East Germany
- 1967–1974: Güstrow

Individual honours
- 1974, 1976, 1978 1979, 1980: East German Champion

Team honours
- 1968, 1972, 1973, 1974: East German league champion

Dieter Tetzlaff (born 13 January 1944) is a former international speedway rider from East Germany.

== Speedway career ==
Tetzlaff was a five times champion of East Germany, winning the East German Championship on five occasions in 1974, 1976, 1978, 1979 and 1980.

Tetzlaff rode for MC Güstrow, winning the East German Team Speedway Championship four times in 1968, 1972, 1973 and 1974.
