= Sweden national speedway team =

Swedish national motorcycle speedway team

Sweden
- Nation colour: Yellow
- SWC Wins: 11 (1952, 1963, 1964, 1967, 1970, 1994, 2000, 2003, 2004, 2015)

The Sweden national speedway team are one of the major teams in international motorcycle speedway.

== History ==
The Sweden speedway team has won the Speedway World Team Cup and Speedway World Cup on ten occasions and were a major force in the opening years of the tournament, winning four out of the first five, between 1960 and 1964. Key riders of the period were Ove Fundin, Rune Sörmander, Björn Knutson, Göte Nordin and Sören Sjösten.

The cup eluded them for 23 years between 1971 and 1993, but they regained the trophy in 1994, when Tony Rickardsson, Henrik Gustafsson and Mikael Karlsson were successful. Sweden bookended the original World Team Cup, winning the inaugural final at the Ullevi Stadium at home in Göteborg, in 1960 before winning the last World Team Cup in 2000 at the Brandon Stadium in Coventry, England.

They also went on to win in 2003 and 2004 and 2015. Additionally, they won the defunct Speedway World Pairs Championship five times, in 1968, 1973, 1974, 1975 and 1993.

== Major tournament wins ==
=== World Team Championships ===
Year	Venue	Standings (Pts)	Sweden Riders and Pts	
1960	(Sweden); Göteborg; Ullevi	1. Sweden (44); 2. England (30); 3. (Czech Republic) Czechoslovakia (15); 4. Poland (7)	Ove Fundin	12
1960	(Sweden); Göteborg; Ullevi	1. Sweden (44); 2. England (30); 3. (Czech Republic) Czechoslovakia (15); 4. Poland (7)	Olle Nygren	12
1960	(Sweden); Göteborg; Ullevi	1. Sweden (44); 2. England (30); 3. (Czech Republic) Czechoslovakia (15); 4. Poland (7)	Rune Sörmander	11
1960	(Sweden); Göteborg; Ullevi	1. Sweden (44); 2. England (30); 3. (Czech Republic) Czechoslovakia (15); 4. Poland (7)	Björn Knutson	9
1960	(Sweden); Göteborg; Ullevi	1. Sweden (44); 2. England (30); 3. (Czech Republic) Czechoslovakia (15); 4. Poland (7)	Göte Nordin	-
1962	(Czech Republic); Slaný; Slaný Stadium	1. Sweden (36); 2. (United Kingdom) Great Britain (24); 3. Poland (20); 4. (Czech Republic) Czechoslovakia (16)	Björn Knutson	10
1962	(Czech Republic); Slaný; Slaný Stadium	1. Sweden (36); 2. (United Kingdom) Great Britain (24); 3. Poland (20); 4. (Czech Republic) Czechoslovakia (16)	Sören Sjösten	10
1962	(Czech Republic); Slaný; Slaný Stadium	1. Sweden (36); 2. (United Kingdom) Great Britain (24); 3. Poland (20); 4. (Czech Republic) Czechoslovakia (16)	Ove Fundin	9
1962	(Czech Republic); Slaný; Slaný Stadium	1. Sweden (36); 2. (United Kingdom) Great Britain (24); 3. Poland (20); 4. (Czech Republic) Czechoslovakia (16)	Göte Nordin	4
1962	(Czech Republic); Slaný; Slaný Stadium	1. Sweden (36); 2. (United Kingdom) Great Britain (24); 3. Poland (20); 4. (Czech Republic) Czechoslovakia (16)	Rune Sörmander	3
1963	(Austria); Vienna; Stadion Wien	1. Sweden (37); 2. (Czech Republic) Czechoslovakia (27); 3. (United Kingdom) Great Britain (25); 4. Poland (7)	Bjorn Knutson	11
1963	(Austria); Vienna; Stadion Wien	1. Sweden (37); 2. (Czech Republic) Czechoslovakia (27); 3. (United Kingdom) Great Britain (25); 4. Poland (7)	Per Olof Söderman	10
1963	(Austria); Vienna; Stadion Wien	1. Sweden (37); 2. (Czech Republic) Czechoslovakia (27); 3. (United Kingdom) Great Britain (25); 4. Poland (7)	Ove Fundin	7
1963	(Austria); Vienna; Stadion Wien	1. Sweden (37); 2. (Czech Republic) Czechoslovakia (27); 3. (United Kingdom) Great Britain (25); 4. Poland (7)	Göte Nordin	6
1963	(Austria); Vienna; Stadion Wien	1. Sweden (37); 2. (Czech Republic) Czechoslovakia (27); 3. (United Kingdom) Great Britain (25); 4. Poland (7)	Rune Sörmander	3
1964	(West Germany); Abensberg; Abensberg Stadion	1. Sweden (34); 2. Soviet Union (25); 3. (United Kingdom) Great Britain (21); 4. Poland (16)	Björn Knutson	11
1964	(West Germany); Abensberg; Abensberg Stadion	1. Sweden (34); 2. Soviet Union (25); 3. (United Kingdom) Great Britain (21); 4. Poland (16)	Göte Nordin	10
1964	(West Germany); Abensberg; Abensberg Stadion	1. Sweden (34); 2. Soviet Union (25); 3. (United Kingdom) Great Britain (21); 4. Poland (16)	Rune Sörmander	7
1964	(West Germany); Abensberg; Abensberg Stadion	1. Sweden (34); 2. Soviet Union (25); 3. (United Kingdom) Great Britain (21); 4. Poland (16)	Ove Fundin	6
1964	(West Germany); Abensberg; Abensberg Stadion	1. Sweden (34); 2. Soviet Union (25); 3. (United Kingdom) Great Britain (21); 4. Poland (16)	Sören Sjösten	0
1967	(Sweden); Malmö; Malmö Stadion	1. Sweden (32); 2. Poland (26); 3. (United Kingdom) Great Britain (19); = Soviet Union (19)	Göte Nordin	11
1967	(Sweden); Malmö; Malmö Stadion	1. Sweden (32); 2. Poland (26); 3. (United Kingdom) Great Britain (19); = Soviet Union (19)	Bengt Jansson	9
1967	(Sweden); Malmö; Malmö Stadion	1. Sweden (32); 2. Poland (26); 3. (United Kingdom) Great Britain (19); = Soviet Union (19)	Ove Fundin	6
1967	(Sweden); Malmö; Malmö Stadion	1. Sweden (32); 2. Poland (26); 3. (United Kingdom) Great Britain (19); = Soviet Union (19)	Torbjörn Harrysson	6
1967	(Sweden); Malmö; Malmö Stadion	1. Sweden (32); 2. Poland (26); 3. (United Kingdom) Great Britain (19); = Soviet Union (19)	Per Olof Söderman	-
1970	(England); London; Wembley Stadium	1. Sweden (42); 2. (United Kingdom) Great Britain (31); 3. Poland (20); 4. (Czech Republic) Czechoslovakia (3)	Ove Fundin	11
1970	(England); London; Wembley Stadium	1. Sweden (42); 2. (United Kingdom) Great Britain (31); 3. Poland (20); 4. (Czech Republic) Czechoslovakia (3)	Bengt Jansson	11
1970	(England); London; Wembley Stadium	1. Sweden (42); 2. (United Kingdom) Great Britain (31); 3. Poland (20); 4. (Czech Republic) Czechoslovakia (3)	Anders Michanek	10
1970	(England); London; Wembley Stadium	1. Sweden (42); 2. (United Kingdom) Great Britain (31); 3. Poland (20); 4. (Czech Republic) Czechoslovakia (3)	Sören Sjösten	10
1970	(England); London; Wembley Stadium	1. Sweden (42); 2. (United Kingdom) Great Britain (31); 3. Poland (20); 4. (Czech Republic) Czechoslovakia (3)	Bernt Persson	-
1994	(Germany); Brokstedt; Holsteinring Brokstedt	1. Sweden (23); 2. Poland (20); 3. Denmark (17); 4. Australia (17); 5. (United States) USA (17); 6. Germany (16); = England (16)	Tony Rickardsson	12+2
1994	(Germany); Brokstedt; Holsteinring Brokstedt	1. Sweden (23); 2. Poland (20); 3. Denmark (17); 4. Australia (17); 5. (United States) USA (17); 6. Germany (16); = England (16)	Henrik Gustafsson	11+2
1994	(Germany); Brokstedt; Holsteinring Brokstedt	1. Sweden (23); 2. Poland (20); 3. Denmark (17); 4. Australia (17); 5. (United States) USA (17); 6. Germany (16); = England (16)	Mikael Karlsson	-
2000	(England); Coventry; Brandon Stadium	1. Sweden (40); 2. England (40); 3. (United States) USA (35); 4. Australia (29)	Tony Rickardsson	16
2000	(England); Coventry; Brandon Stadium	1. Sweden (40); 2. England (40); 3. (United States) USA (35); 4. Australia (29)	Henrik Gustafsson	12+2
2000	(England); Coventry; Brandon Stadium	1. Sweden (40); 2. England (40); 3. (United States) USA (35); 4. Australia (29)	Peter Karlsson	10+1
2000	(England); Coventry; Brandon Stadium	1. Sweden (40); 2. England (40); 3. (United States) USA (35); 4. Australia (29)	Mikael Karlsson	2
2000	(England); Coventry; Brandon Stadium	1. Sweden (40); 2. England (40); 3. (United States) USA (35); 4. Australia (29)	Niklas Klingberg	0
2003	(Denmark); Vojens; Vojens Speedway Center	1. Sweden (62); 2. Australia (57); 3. Denmark (53); 4. Poland (49); 5. (United Kingdom) Great Britain (44)	Mikael Max	19+2
2003	(Denmark); Vojens; Vojens Speedway Center	1. Sweden (62); 2. Australia (57); 3. Denmark (53); 4. Poland (49); 5. (United Kingdom) Great Britain (44)	Andreas Jonsson	12
2003	(Denmark); Vojens; Vojens Speedway Center	1. Sweden (62); 2. Australia (57); 3. Denmark (53); 4. Poland (49); 5. (United Kingdom) Great Britain (44)	Peter Karlsson	10
2003	(Denmark); Vojens; Vojens Speedway Center	1. Sweden (62); 2. Australia (57); 3. Denmark (53); 4. Poland (49); 5. (United Kingdom) Great Britain (44)	Peter Ljung	10
2003	(Denmark); Vojens; Vojens Speedway Center	1. Sweden (62); 2. Australia (57); 3. Denmark (53); 4. Poland (49); 5. (United Kingdom) Great Britain (44)	David Ruud	5
2004	(England); Poole; Poole Stadium	1. Sweden (49); 2. (United Kingdom) Great Britain (48); 3. Denmark (32); 4. Poland (23)	Peter Karlsson	12
2004	(England); Poole; Poole Stadium	1. Sweden (49); 2. (United Kingdom) Great Britain (48); 3. Denmark (32); 4. Poland (23)	Tony Rickardsson	12
2004	(England); Poole; Poole Stadium	1. Sweden (49); 2. (United Kingdom) Great Britain (48); 3. Denmark (32); 4. Poland (23)	Antonio Lindbäck	9
2004	(England); Poole; Poole Stadium	1. Sweden (49); 2. (United Kingdom) Great Britain (48); 3. Denmark (32); 4. Poland (23)	Mikael Max	9
2004	(England); Poole; Poole Stadium	1. Sweden (49); 2. (United Kingdom) Great Britain (48); 3. Denmark (32); 4. Poland (23)	Andreas Jonsson	7
2015	(Denmark); Vojens; Vojens Speedway Center	1. Sweden (34); 2. Denmark (32); 3. Poland (27); 4. Australia (26)	Andreas Jonsson	12
2015	(Denmark); Vojens; Vojens Speedway Center	1. Sweden (34); 2. Denmark (32); 3. Poland (27); 4. Australia (26)	Freddie Lindgren	11
2015	(Denmark); Vojens; Vojens Speedway Center	1. Sweden (34); 2. Denmark (32); 3. Poland (27); 4. Australia (26)	Antonio Lindbäck	7
2015	(Denmark); Vojens; Vojens Speedway Center	1. Sweden (34); 2. Denmark (32); 3. Poland (27); 4. Australia (26)	Linus Sundström	4

==== Titles ====
Preceded by Inaugural Champions	World Champions; 1960 (1st title)	Succeeded by Poland
Preceded by Poland	World Champions; 1962 (2nd title); 1963 (3rd title); 1964 (4th title)	Succeeded by Poland
Preceded by Poland	World Champions; 1967 (5th title)	Succeeded by (United Kingdom) Great Britain
Preceded by Poland	World Champions; 1970 (6th title)	Succeeded by (United Kingdom) Great Britain
Preceded by United States	World Champions; 1994 (7th title)	Succeeded by Denmark
Preceded by Australia	World Champions; 2000 (8th title)	Succeeded by Australia
Preceded by Australia	World Champions; 2003 (9th title); 2004 (10th title)	Succeeded by Poland
Preceded by Denmark	World Champions; 2015 (11th title)	Succeeded by Poland

=== World Pairs Championship ===
Year	Riders
1968	Ove Fundin & Torbjörn Harrysson
1973	Anders Michanek & Tommy Jansson
1974	Anders Michanek & Sören Sjösten
1975	Anders Michanek & Tommy Jansson
1993	Tony Rickardsson, Per Jonsson & Henrik Gustafsson

== International caps (as of 2022) ==
Since the advent of the Speedway Grand Prix era, international caps earned by riders is largely restricted to international competitions, whereas previously test matches between two teams were a regular occurrence. This means that the number of caps earned by a rider has decreased in the modern era.

Rider	Caps
Andersson, Åke	7
Andersson, Bengt Olof	2
Andersson, Björn	10
Andersson, Daniel	1
Andersson, Jan	39
Andersson, Stefan	6
Bengtsson, Lennart	5
Bergqvist, Tommy	2
Blixt, Mikael	18
Brannefors, Bengt	20
Brannefors, Pierre	14
Carlsson, Arne	17
Danielsson, Hasse	15
Dannö, Roland	10
Dannö, Stefan	5
Davidsson, Jan-Olov	9
Davidsson, Jonas	14
Enecrona, Leif	16
Eriksson, Anders	8
Eriksson, Freddie	1
Forsberg, Birger	19
Forsberg, Dan	17
Fundin, Ove	99
Gerhardsson, Per Ake	1
Gustafsson, Henka	50
Harrysson, Torbjörn	26
Hellsen, Richard	22
Henriksson, Terje	3
Holmqvist, Hasse	30
Hultberg, Lars-Inge	1
Hultgren, Jurgen Per Gunnar	2
Ivarsson, Conny	40
Jansson, Bengt	107
Jansson, Lars	8
Jansson, Tommy	52
Johansson, Jorgen	12
Johansson, Tommy	32
Johansson, Lillebror	5
Johansson, Stefan	3
Johansson, Uno Ingemar	3
Jonasson, Thomas	4
Jonsson, Alfe Folke	10
Jonsson, Andreas	26
Jonsson, Per	65
Josefsson, Bo	13
Karlsson, Magnus	1
Karlsson, Niklas	4
Karlsson, Peter	40
Karlsson, Sören	29
Karlsson, Sune	7
Klingberg, Börje	5
Klingberg, Niklas	11
Knutson, Björn	42
Larsson, Bengt	26
Larsson, Leif	14
Lindbäck, Antonio	17
Lindgren, Freddie	19
Ljung, Peter	6
Löfqvist, Christer	42
Löfqvist, Dennis	7
Malmqvist, Gunnar	13
Max, Mikael	21
Michanek, Anders	101
Nahlin, Peter	32
Nermark, Daniel	5
Nilsen, Jimmy	53
Nilsson, Tommy	65
Nordin, Göte	45
Nygren, Olle	90
Nystrom, Kenneth	6
Olsson, Tony	26
Persson, Bernt	102
Pettersson, Tommy	7
Rickardsson, Tony	43
Ringstrom, Nils	4
Rohlén, Christer	2
Ruud, David	6
Salomonsson, Stefan	5
Samuelsson, Conny	9
Segerstrom, Olle	2
Simensen, Jan	25
Sjösten, Christer	8
Sjösten, Sören	76
Smith, Peter	1
Soderberg, Leif	1
Söderman, Peo	44
Sörmander, Rune	66
Stenlung, Erik	25
Svensson, Per Tage	14
Teurnberg, Mikael	9
Wahlmann, Leif	2
Wedin, Runo	1
Wirebrand, Bo	16
Zetterström, Magnus	3
