= Jochen Dinse =

German speedway rider

- Born: 3 September 1941; Germany
- Died: 8 December 2016 (aged 75)
- Nationality: Germany

Career history

East Germany
- 1965–1967: Meissen

Individual honours
- 1963, 1964, 1965, 1967, 1968, 1973: East German champion
- 1967: Speedway World Championship finalist

Jochen Dinse (3 September 1941 - 8 December 2016) was an international speedway rider from East Germany.

== Speedway career ==
Dinse reached the final of the Speedway World Championship in the 1967 Individual Speedway World Championship.

Dinse was a six-time champion of East Germany after winning the German Individual Speedway Championship and East German Longtrack Champion in 1974 and 1975.

Dinse died in 2016.

== World final appearances ==
=== Individual World Championship ===
- 1967 – (England) London, Wembley Stadium – 16th – 0pts

=== World Pairs Championship ===
- 1969 - (Sweden) Stockholm (with Gerhard Uhlenbrock) - 6th - 9pts (1)
