= British League Knockout Cup 1965 =

1965 British League Knockout Cup
Tournament details
- Country: England

Final positions
- Champions: West Ham Hammers
- Runners-up: Exeter Falcons

The British League Knockout Cup 1965 was the 27th edition of the Knockout Cup. It was the first time that it was called the British League Knockout Cup following a reorganisation of speedway in the United Kingdom. West Ham Hammers won the cup and therefore secured the league and cup double.

== First round ==
4 May

Long Eaton Archers	51–45	Halifax Dukes
(Australia) Ray Cresp 15*		(England) Dave Younghusband 14+1

8 May

Edinburgh Monarchs	49–46	Hackney Hawks
(New Zealand) Colin McKee 15*		(England) Gerry Jackson 15

== Round two ==
28 June

Exeter Falcons	63–33	Belle Vue Aces
(England) Colin Gooddy 15*		(England) Cyril Maidment 13

28 June

Newcastle Diamonds	45–51	Swindon Robins
(England) Mike Watkin 8+3		(New Zealand) Barry Briggs 15*

29 June

Long Eaton Archers	50–45	Coventry Bees
(England) Ray Wilson 10+1		(England) Nigel Boocock 14+1* (England) Jim Lightfoot 14+1*

29 June

West Ham Hammers	56–40	Newport Wasps
(Scotland) Ken McKinlay 13+2*		(Australia) Jack Biggs 12

30 June

Poole Pirates	4–2a	Edinburgh Monarchs
	Abandoned after heat one

2 July

Glasgow Tigers	64–32	Sheffield Tigers
(England) Maury Mattingley 14 (Australia) Charlie Monk 14		(England) Jack Kitchen 16

8 July

Oxford Cheetahs	35–43	Wimbledon Dons
(Denmark) Arne Pander 13	Ran over 13 heats, Result Stands	(England) Trevor Hedge 12

14 July

Poole Pirates	51–45	Edinburgh Monarchs
(Australia) Geoff Mudge 13 (England) Ronnie Genz 13		(Sweden) Olle Nygren 15

24 July

Cradley Heath Heathens	43–53	Wolverhampton Wolves
(England) John Hart 15		(Australia) Jim Airey 14 (England) Bob Andrews 14

== Third round ==
3 August

West Ham Hammers	48–48	Wimbledon Dons
(Scotland) Ken McKinlay 15*		(Sweden) Olle Nygren 12*

9 August

Exeter Falcons	68–28	Long Eaton Archers
(Australia) Jack Geran 15*		(England) Ray Wilson 9

11 August

Poole Pirates	45–51	Wolverhampton Wolves
(New Zealand) Bill Andrew 16		(England) Bob Andrews 13

13 August

Glasgow Tigers	49–46	Swindon Robins
(Australia) Charlie Monk 15*		(New Zealand) Barry Briggs 13 (New Zealand) Mike Broadbank 13

Third Round Replay

14 August

Wimbledon Dons	47–49	West Ham Hammers
(Sweden) Olle Nygren 14+1		(Scotland) Ken McKinlay 13+2

== Semi-final ==
6 September

Exeter Falcons	59–37	Wolverhampton Wolves
(England) Alan Cowland 14		(England) Pete Jarman 13

10 September

Glasgow Tigers	43–50	West Ham Hammers
(Australia) Charlie Monk 12		(Scotland) Ken McKinlay 14

== Final (First Leg) ==
5 October

West Ham Hammers	63–33	Exeter Falcons

=== Scorers ===
West Ham Hammers

- 1) (Scotland) Ken McKinlay 2* 2* 2* 3 2* – 11 (4)*
- 2) (England) Reg Trott 3 3 3 1 2* – 12 (1)
- 3) (Norway) Sverre Harrfeldt 3 3 3 3 3 – 15*
- 4) (England) Brian Leonard 1 1 2 0 0 – 4
- 5) (England) Norman Hunter Ef 3 3 3 3 – 12
- 6) (England) Malcolm Simmons 2 2* 2* Ef 3 – 9 (2)
- 7) (England) Tony Clarke 0 0 – 0

Exeter Falcons

- 1) (England) Colin Gooddy 0 1 0 2 2 – 6
- 2) (England) Des Lukehurst 1 1* 1 1* 1 – 5 (2)
- 3) (England) Jimmy Squibb 2 0 1 1 0 – 4
- 4) (England) lan Cowland 0 0 1 0 0 – 1
- 5) (Canada) Chris Blewett 1 F N N N – 1
- 6) (Australia) Jack Geran 3 2 2 2 1 – 10
- 7) (Wales) Ivor Hughes 2 3 0 1* 1* – 7 (2)

=== Heat by Heat ===
- Ht 01: Trott, McKinlay, Lukehurst, Gooddy 75.4
- Ht 02: Harrfeldt, Squibb, Leonard, Cowland 73.8
- Ht 03: Trott, Hughes, Lukehurst, Clarke (f rem) 76.4
- Ht 04: Harrfeldt, McKinlay, Gooddy, Squibb 75.2
- Ht 05: Geran, Simmons, Blewett (f rem), Hunter (ef) 75.8
- Ht 06: Trott, McKinlay, Squibb, Cowland 76.2
- Ht 07: Harrfeldt, Geran, Leonard, Blewett (f) 75.4
- Ht 08: Hunter, Simmons, Lukehurst, Gooddy 75.4
- Ht 09: Hughes, Leonard, Cowland, Clarke 77.6
- Ht 10: McKinlay, Geran, Trott, Hughes 76.0
- Ht 11: Hunter, Simmons, Squibb, Cowland 75.2
- Ht 12: Harrfeldt, Gooddy, Lukehurst, Leonard 77.4
- Ht 13: Hunter, Geran, Hughes, Simmons (ef) 76.2
- Ht 14: Harrfeldt, McKinlay, Lukehurst, Cowland 76.2
- Ht 15: Simmons, Trott, Geran, Squibb 76.8
- Ht 16: Hunter, Gooddy, Hughes, Leonard 77.2

== Final (Second Leg) ==
11 October

Exeter Falcons	45–51	West Ham Hammers

=== Scorers ===
Exeter Falcons

- 1) (England) Colin Gooddy Ef 3 2 3 2* – 10 (1)
- 2) (England) Des Lukehurst 2 3 1* 0 0 – 6 (1)
- 3) (Australia) Jack Geran 2 Ef Ef 2 3 -7
- 4) (Canada) Chris Blewett Ret 1 3 Fx N – 4
- 5) (England) lan Cowland 0 2 1* 3 Ef – 6 (1)
- 6) (England) Jimmy Squibb 1 1* 2 2* 2 – 8 (2)
- 7) (Wales) Ivor Hughes 2* 0 2 – 4 (1)

West Ham Hammers

- 1) (Scotland) Ken McKinlay 3 1* 3 3 3 – 13 (1)
- 2) (England) Reg Trott 1 1 0 N 1 – 3
- 3) (Norway) Sverre Harrfeldt 3 2 3 3 3 – 14
- 4) (England) Brian Leonard 1 0 2 0 F – 3
- 5) (England) Norman Hunter 3 3 2 Ef 1 – 9
- 6) (England) Malcolm Simmons 2* 2* 1* 1 1 – 7 (3)
- 7) (England) Tony Clarke 0 1* 1 – 2 (1)

=== Heat by Heat ===
- Ht 01: McKinlay, Lukehurst, Trott, Gooddy (ef) 75.0
- Ht 02: Harrfeldt, Geran, Leonard, Blewett (ret) 74.8
- Ht 03: Lukehurst, Hughes, Trott, Clarke 75.2 5 1 9 9
- Ht 04: Gooddy, Harrfeldt, McKinlay, Geran (ef) 74.0
- Ht 05: Hunter, Simmons, Squibb, Cowland 75.0
- Ht 06: Harrfeldt, Gooddy, Lukehurst, Leonard 74.2
- Ht 07: Hunter, Simmons, Blewett, Geran (ef) 75.2
- Ht 08: McKinlay, Cowland, Squibb, Trott 75.8
- Ht 09: Blewett, Leonard, Clarke, Hughes 75.6
- Ht 10: Gooddy, Hunter, Simmons, Lukehurst 74.6
- Ht 11: Harrfeldt, Squibb, Cowland, Leonard 75.0
- Ht 12: McKinlay, Geran, Clarke, Blewett (f exc) 75.4
- Ht 13: Cowland, Squibb, Simmons, Hunter (ef) 76.8
- Ht 14: Geran, Gooddy, Trott, Leonard (f) 75.8
- Ht 15: Harrfeldt, Squibb, Simmons, Lukehurst 75.0
- Ht 16: McKinlay, Hughes, Hunter, Cowland (ef) 76.0

== See also ==
- 1965 British League season
- Knockout Cup (speedway)
