= British League Knockout Cup 1967 =

1967 British League Knockout Cup
Tournament details
- Country: England

Final positions
- Champions: Coventry Bees
- Runners-up: West Ham Hammers

The British League Knockout Cup 1967 was the 29th edition of the Knockout Cup. The cup was won by Coventry Bees.

== First round ==
22 April

Belle Vue Aces	50 - 46	Wimbledon Dons
(England) Tommy Roper 14		(England) Trevor Hedge 16

22 April

Cradley Heath Heathens	P - P	Long Eaton Archers

22 April

Edinburgh Monarchs	56 - 40	Sheffield Tigers
(Scotland) Bill Landels 14		(England) Arnie Haley 16

19 June

Cradley Heath Heathens	45 - 51	Long Eaton Archers
(England) Ivor Brown 10 (2) (New Zealand) Graham Coombes 11 (1)		(England) Ray Wilson 15* (Sweden) Anders Michanek 15*

== Second round ==
3 June

Swindon Robins	61 - 35	Exeter Falcons
(England) Bob Kilby 18*		(Australia) Neil Street 10 (1)

6 June

West Ham Hammers	67 - 29	Glasgow Tigers
(Norway) Sverre Harrfeldt 14 (1)* (Scotland) Ken McKinlay 13.5 (1.5) (England) Malcolm Simmons 10.5 (2.5)		(Scotland) Jim McMillan 8

9 June

Kings Lynn Stars	47 - 36	Belle Vue Aces
(England) Terry Betts 15*	Meeting abandoned after heat 14 by the referee, heats 15 & 16 raced without the supervision of the referee. Official score is the result at heat 14.	(Scotland) Norman Nevitt 8 (1) (Hungary) Sándor Lévai 8 (1)

10 June

Coventry Bees	50 - 46	Newcastle Diamonds
(England) Nigel Boocock 15*		(New Zealand) Ivan Mauger 16

14 June

Poole Pirates	60 - 36	Halifax Dukes
(Sweden) Göte Nordin 15*		(England) Dave Younghusband 14

16 June

Hackney Hawks	53 - 43	Oxford Cheetahs
(England) Colin Pratt 14 (1)*		(England) Eddie Reeves 13 (2)

24 June

Edinburgh Monarchs	54 - 42	Wolverhampton Wolves
(Norway) Oyvind Berg 10 (2)		(Australia) Jim Airey 14 (1)

4 July

Long Eaton Archers	54 - 42	Newport Wasps
(Sweden) Anders Michanek 17		(Sweden) Torbjörn Harrysson 15

== Third round ==
21 July

Hackney Hawks	53 - 42	Poole Pirates
(Sweden) Bengt Jansson 15*		(Sweden) Göte Nordin 12 (England) Ronnie Genz 11 (1) (Australia) Geoff Mudge 11 (1)

1 August

Long Eaton Archers	44 - 52	Edinburgh Monarchs
(England) Ray Wilson 17		(Sweden) Bernt Persson 14

1 August

West Ham Hammers	51 - 45	Swindon Robins
(Norway) Sverre Harrfeldt 14 (Scotland) Ken McKinlay 14		(New Zealand) Barry Briggs 14

2 August

Coventry Bees	58.5 - 37.5	Kings Lynn Stars
(England) Ron Mountford 13		(England) Terry Betts 16.5

== Semi-final ==
5 September

West Ham Hammers	51 - 45	Hackney Hawks
(Norway) Sverre Harrfeldt 14		(England) Colin Pratt 16

13 September

Coventry Bees	58 - 38	Edinburgh Monarchs
(England) Nigel Boocock 15*		(Norway) Reidar Eide 11

== Final (First Leg) ==
23 September

Coventry Bees	57 - 39	West Ham Hammers

Scorers Coventry Bees

- 1) (England) Nigel Boocock 2* 2 2 3 3 - 12 (1)
- 2) (England) Les Owen 3 3 1* 0 2* - 9 (2)
- 3) (England) Roger Hill 2 0 1 1* 0 - 4 (1)
- 4) (England) Rick France F Ef 3 2 3 - 8
- 5) (England) Col Cottrell 2* 2 1 2* 1 - 8 (2)
- 6) (England) Ron Mountford 3 1* 3 3 3 - 13 (1)
- 7) (England) Clive Hitch 2* 1 - 3 (1)

West Ham Hammers

- 1) (Scotland) Ken McKinlay 1 3 3 3 3 2 - 15
- 2) (England) Malcolm Simmons 0 Ef 0 TS TS - 0
- 3) (England) Norman Hunter 3 1 0 2 2 1 - 9
- 4) (England) Tony Clarke 1 TS 2 0 TS - 3
- 5) (Norway) Sverre Harrfeldt 1 3 2 1 1* 0 - 8 (1)
- 6) (England) Brian Leonard 0 2* 1* 0 0 0 - 3 (2)
- 7) (England) George Barclay 1 0 - 1

Heat by Heat

- Ht 01: Owen, Boocock, McKinlay, Simmons 67.8
- Ht 02: Hunter, Hill, Clarke, France (f) 69.0
- Ht 03: Owen, Hitch, Barclay, Simmons (ef) 70.2
- Ht 04: McKinlay, Boocock, Hunter, Hill 68.0
- Ht 05: Mountford, Cottrell, Harrfeldt, Leonard 69.4
- Ht 06: McKinlay, Boocock, Owen, Hunter 69.0
- Ht 07: Harrfeldt, Leonard, Hill, France (ef) 70.0
- Ht 08: McKinlay, Cottrell, Mountford, Simmons 70.0
- Ht 09: France, Clarke, Hitch, Barclay 71.0
- Ht 10: Boocock, Harrfeldt, Leonard, Owen 70.0
- Ht 11: Mountford, Hunter, Cottrell, Clarke 70.2
- Ht 12: McKinlay, France, Hill, Leonard 70.2
- Ht 13: Mountford, Cottrell, Harrfeldt, Leonard 70.6
- Ht 14: Boocock, Hunter, Harrfeldt, Hill 71.0
- Ht 15: Mountford, Owen, Hunter, Leonard 71.6
- Ht 16: France, McKinlay, Cottrell, Harrfeldt 69.6

== Final (Second Leg) ==
26 September

West Ham Hammers	49 - 47	Coventry Bees

Scorers West Ham Hammers

- 1) (Scotland) Ken McKinlay 3 1* 3 1 1* - 9 (2)
- 2) (England) Malcolm Simmons 0 3 2* 3 3 - 11 (1)
- 3) (England) Norman Hunter Ef 2 3 2 2 - 9
- 4) (England) Tony Clarke 1 0 2 0 2 - 5
- 5) (Norway) Sverre Harrfeldt FNS N N N N - 0
- 6) (England) Brian Leonard 3 1* 3 2 2* - 11 (2)
- 7) (England) Stan Stevens 0 0 2 0 1 1* - 4 (1)

Coventry Bees

- 1) (England) Nigel Boocock 2 3 3 3 3 - 14
- 2) (England) Les Owen 1* 2 0 1 0 - 4 (1)
- 3) (England) Roger Hill 2* F 0 0 N - 2 (1)
- 4) (England) Rick France 3 1 3 2 3 - 12
- 5) (England) Col Cottrell 2 1* 0 0 1 - 4 (1)
- 6) (England) Ron Mountford 1* 2 2 3 1 - 9 (1)
- 7) (England) Clive Hitch 1* 1 0 - 2 (1)

Heat by Heat Heat by Heat

- Ht 01: McKinlay, Boocock, Owen, Simmons 73.0
- Ht 02: France, Hill, Clarke, Hunter (ef) 74.0
- Ht 03: Simmons, Owen, Hitch, Stevens 74.6
- Ht 04: Boocock, Hunter, McKinlay, Hill (f) 73.8
- Ht 05: Leonard, Cottrell, Mountford, Stevens, Harrfeldt (f ns) 74.4
- Ht 06: McKinlay, Simmons, France, Hill 74.6
- Ht 07: Hunter, Mountford, Cottrell, Clarke 75.0
- Ht 08: Boocock, Stevens, Leonard, Owen 75.2
- Ht 09: France, Clarke, Hitch, Stevens 75.4
- Ht 10: Simmons, Mountford, McKinlay, Cottrell 74.8
- Ht 11: Leonard, France, Stevens, Hill 75.2
- Ht 12: Boocock, Hunter, Owen, Clarke 75.2
- Ht 13: Mountford, Leonard, Stevens, Cottrell 76.0
- Ht 14: France, Hunter, McKinlay, Owen 75.4
- Ht 15: Simmons, Leonard, Mountford, Hitch 75.2
- Ht 16: Boocock, Clarke, Cottrell, Harrfeldt (ns) 75.8

== See also ==
- List of United Kingdom Speedway League Champions
- Knockout Cup (speedway)
