= Alan Molyneux =

English speedway rider

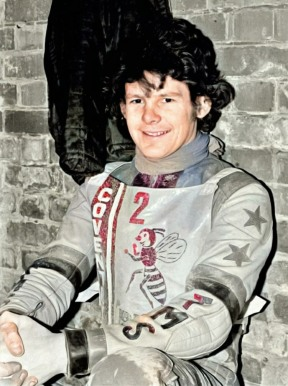
- Speedway rider
- Born: 12 August 1950 (age 76); Derby, England
- Nationality: British (English)

Career history
- 1973–1974, 1982–1983, 1985: Long Eaton Invaders
- 1974: Cradley Heathens
- 1975: Stoke Potters
- 1975–1980: Coventry Bees
- 1981: Sheffield Tigers
- 1982: Birmingham Brummies

Individual honours
- 1979: British Championship finalist

Team honours
- 1978, 1979: British League Champion
- 1976, 1977, 1978, 1979: Midland Cup
- 1980: Midland League

Alan Reginald Molyneux (born 12 August 1950) is a former motorcycle speedway rider from England. He earned one international cap for the England national speedway team.

== Speedway career ==
Molyneux reached the final of the British Speedway Championship in 1979. He rode in the top tier of British Speedway from 1973 to 1985, riding for various clubs.

Molyneux left Long Eaton Archers in 1974 to join Stoke Potters. However, he achieved most of his domestic success riding for Coventry Bees, winning two league championships with the Midllands club. He averaged 8.06 in 1978. He also won four consecutive Midland Cups from 1976 to 1979.

Molyneux retired in 1983, but made a brief comeback in 1985 for Long Eaton to help them over injury problems.

== After speedway ==
Molyneux went back to the Nottingham lace industry for 17 years until the trade died out and took up employment at a factory making caravan interiors. He is married to Linda, and they live in Long Eaton. They have two children and grandchildren. Apart from the occasional visit to stadiums to watch, Molyneux makes model speedway bikes.
