= Ron Mountford =

British motorcycle speedway rider (1927–1993)

Ronald George Mountford
- Born: 31 May 1927; Birmingham, England
- Died: 18 March 1993 (aged 65)
- Nationality: British (English)

Career history
- 1950-1957: Birmingham Brummies
- 1957-1968, 1970-1972: Coventry Bees

Individual honours
- 1954: Midland Riders' Champion
- 1962: Speedway World Championship finalist

Team honours
- 1968: British League Champion
- 1967: British League KO Cup winner
- 1953, 1954, 1955, 1960, 1966, 1971: Midland Cup
- 1961: Central Shield

Ronald George Mountford (1927-1993) was an international motorcycle speedway rider from England. He earned 25 international caps for the England national speedway team and 4 caps for the Great Britain team.

== Speedway career ==
Mountford was a leading rider in the 1950s and 1960s and reached the final of the Speedway World Championship in the 1962 Individual Speedway World Championship.

Mountford rode in the top tier of British Speedway from 1950 to 1972, riding for Birmingham Brummies and Coventry Bees.

During 1957, Mountford was suspended by the Auto Cyclist Union, along with Birmingham teammate Eric Boothroyd for riding in South Africa.

In 1966, Mountford was made the club captain at Coventry.

== World final appearances ==
=== Individual World Championship ===
- 1962 - (England) London, Wembley Stadium - 16th - 2pts
- 1963 - (England) London, Wembley Stadium - Reserve - Did not ride
