= British League Knockout Cup =

Knockout Cup competition

- Formerly: National Trophy
- Sport: Speedway
- Founded: 1965
- Folded: 1994
- Replaced by: Premier League Knockout Cup (1995 & 1996 only) and then Elite League Knockout Cup (1997)
- Country: United Kingdom

The British League Knockout Cup was a speedway Knockout Cup competition in the United Kingdom governed by the Speedway Control Board (SCB) in conjunction with the British Speedway Promoters' Association (BSPA), that was staged between 1965 and 1994. The teams from the top division of league racing, the British League, took part. A similar competition was held for clubs in leagues that succeeded the British League, including the Elite League Knockout Cup and the Premier League Knockout Cup.

== Rules ==
This competition was run on the knockout principle; teams drawn together race home and away matches, with the aggregate score deciding the result. In the event of the aggregate score being level, the teams again race home and away.

== Winners ==
Year	Winners	Runners-up
British League Knockout Cup
1965	West Ham Hammers	Exeter Falcons
1966	Halifax Dukes	Wimbledon Dons
1967	Coventry Bees	West Ham Hammers
1968	Wimbledon Dons	Wolverhampton Wolves
1969	Wimbledon Dons	Sheffield Tigers
1970	Wimbledon Dons	Belle Vue Aces
1971	Hackney Hawks	Cradley Heath Heathens
1972	Belle Vue Aces	Hackney Hawks
1973	Belle Vue Aces	Reading Racers
1974	Sheffield Tigers	Ipswich Witches
1975	Belle Vue Aces	Leicester Lions
1976	Ipswich Witches	King's Lynn Stars
1977	King's Lynn Stars	Reading Racers
1978	Ipswich Witches	Belle Vue Aces
1979	Cradley Heath Heathens	Hull Vikings
1980	Cradley Heath Heathens	Belle Vue Aces
1981	Ipswich Witches	Birmingham Brummies
1982	Cradley Heath Heathens	Belle Vue Aces
1983	Cradley Heath Heathens	Coventry Bees
1984	Ipswich Witches	Belle Vue Aces
1985	Oxford Cheetahs	Ipswich Witches
1986	Oxford Cheetahs & Cradley Heath Heathens*	
1987	Cradley Heath Heathens	Coventry Bees
1988	Cradley Heath Heathens	Coventry Bees
1989	Cradley Heath Heathens	Wolverhampton Wolves
1990	Reading Racers	Bradford Dukes
1991	Bradford Dukes	Cradley Heath Heathens
1992	Bradford Dukes	Reading Racers
1993	Bradford Dukes	Arena Essex Hammers
1994	Eastbourne Eagles	Cradley Heath Heathens

* The first leg of the final at Cradley was drawn, and the second leg at Oxford was cancelled due to bad weather. The official result was declared a draw and both teams shared the Knockout Cup that year.

== See also ==
Knockout Cup (speedway) for full list of winners and competitions
