= Col Cottrell =

British motorcycle speedway rider

- Born: 21 March 1942; Daventry, England
- Died: 1 April 1982 (aged 40); Coventry, England
- Nationality: British (English)

Career history
- 1962-1971: Coventry Bees
- 1971: Oxford Cheetahs

Team honours
- 1968: British League Champion
- 1967: Knockout Cup Winner
- 1966, 1969, 1970: Midland Cup Winner

Colin Richard Cottrell (born 21 March 1942 – 1 April 1982) was an international motorcycle speedway rider from England. He earned one international cap for the England national speedway team.

== Biography ==
Cottrell was a product of the Coventry Speedway training school and first rode in the British speedway leagues for Coventry Bees during the 1962 Speedway National League. He would spend the majority of his career with the West Midlands club, riding for ten seasons from 1962 to 1971, although during his first two years he struggled to break into the Coventry team.

By 1964, Cottrell had improved his average to the extent that he began to ride regularly in the team. By 1965, he was a firm crowd favourite, despite not being able to be traced before the 1965 season got underway (he had been posted to Yorkshire by the Forestry Commission). His good form continued, which remained the case for the next four seasons. Successes included winning the Midland Cup during the 1966 British League season, where he topped scored in the second leg of the final, a Knockout Cup win in 1967 and two more Midland Cup wins in 1969 and 1970 respectively. His finest moment came when he was called up to the England team for the match against Russia in July 1968.

During the 1970 season, Cottrell experienced a loss of form and shortly after the start of the 1971 season he was dropped by manager Charles Ochiltree. This led to his Coventry career coming to an end after he transferred to Oxford Cheetahs.

Cottrell died in 1982 after suffering from leukaemia.

Cottrell had a wife, Wendy and two daughters Sarah Louise and Charlotte Emma.
