= Maury Mattingley =

British motorcycle speedway rider

- Born: 22 October 1923; Totton, Hampshire, England
- Died: 8 November 2007 (aged 84); Southampton, England
- Nationality: British (English)

Career history
- 1952–1957: Southampton Saints
- 1958–1961: Coventry Bees
- 1961–1962: Plymouth Bulldogs
- 1963: Wolverhampton Wolves
- 1964–1967: Glasgow Tigers
- 1968: Poole Pirates

Individual honours
- 1963: Scottish Open

Team honours
- 1963: League champion (tier 2)
- 1956: National Trophy (tier 2)
- 1960: Midland Cup

Maurice William Mattingley (22 October 1923 – 8 November 2007) was a motorcycle speedway rider from England.

== Biography ==
Mattingley, born in Totton, Hampshire, began his British leagues career riding for Southampton Saints during the 1952 Speedway Southern League season and he became an instant success with the team. He was an integral part of the Southampton team over the next six years and helped them win the 1956 division two National Trophy.

In 1958, Mattingley left Southampton to join the Coventry Bees and won the Midland Cup with them in 1960. After four years at Coventry, he joined Plymouth Bulldogs in 1961 and posted an impressive 9.38 average.

In 1963, Mattingley joined Wolverhampton Wolves and the year turned out to be arguably his best, when he won the league title with the team, won the prestigious Scottish Open Championship and performed well in the British round of the 1963 Individual Speedway World Championship. Despite the success that he achieved in 1963, he teamed up with the Glasgow Tigers in 1964 and spent four years with the Scottish club and became their team captain. Remarkably for the era, he commuted by air from Southampton to Glasgow for matches.

Mattingley continued to run his engineering business in Southampton and returned south to race for one final season in 1968 with the Poole Pirates.
