= 1988 British League season =

British motorcycle speedway season

- League: British League
- No. of competitors: 11
- Champions: Coventry Bees
- Knockout Cup: Cradley Heath Heathens
- Individual: Jan O. Pedersen
- Highest average: Hans Nielsen
- Division/s below: 1988 National League

The 1988 British League season was the 54th season of the top tier of speedway in the United Kingdom and the 24th known as the British League.

== Summary ==
Coventry Bees won the league for the second successive year and again by a 16-point margin. The Bees also reached the Knockout Cup final losing to Cradley Heath. Remarkably it was Cradley's seventh Cup win in 10 years. With the League Cup scrapped the Coventry team had less fixtures to ride and their pairing of Tommy Knudsen and Kelvin Tatum were once again the catalyst for the seasons success finishing 2nd and 4th respectively in the averages. Hans Nielsen topped the averages again for the sixth consecutive season.

== Final table ==
Pos	Team	PL	W	D	L	BP	Pts
1	Coventry Bees	40	31	2	7	18	82
2	Belle Vue Aces	40	26	1	13	13	66
3	Cradley Heath Heathens	39	22	1	16	15	60
4	Oxford Cheetahs	40	20	6	14	13	59
5	Reading Racers	40	20	3	17	12	55
6	Sheffield Tigers	39	19	2	18	8	48
7	Swindon Robins	40	17	1	22	8	43
8	Wolverhampton Wolves	40	15	3	22	8	41
9	King's Lynn Stars	40	14	3	23	7	38
10	Ipswich Witches	39	13	0	26	4	30
11	Bradford Dukes	39	10	0	29	2	22

M = Matches; W = Wins; D = Draws; L = Losses; Pts = Total Points

== Fixtures and results ==
=== A fixtures ===
Home \ Away	BV	BRA	COV	CH	IPS	KL	OX	RR	SHE	SWI	WOL
Belle Vue		61–29	42.5–46.5	47–42	50–40	48–42	47–43	54–36	55–35	53–37	51–39
Bradford	42–48		46–44	50–40	49–41	50–40	44–46	43–47	43–47	48–42	46–43
Coventry	48–42	61–29		55–35	46–44	56–34	51–39	45–45	47–43	50–40	52–38
Cradley Heath	48–42	57–33	43–47		42–48	53–37	39–51	47–43	52–38	51–39	48–42
Ipswich	52–38	46–44	36–54	40–50		46–44	44–46	47–43	37–53	52–38	46–44
King's Lynn	51–39	56–34	36–54	49–41	48–42		45–45	42–48	48–42	45–45	53–37
Oxford	45–45	49–41	46–44	49–41	54–36	53–37		45–45	49–41	49–41	45–45
Reading	48–42	52–38	43–47	46–44	53–37	42–48	46–44		53–37	56–34	60–29
Sheffield	53–37	48–42	35–55	45–45	53–37	46–44	45–45	41–49		48–42	49–41
Swindon	39–51	57–33	44–46	39–50	41–49	48–42	43–47	48–42	53–37		53–37
Wolverhampton	47–43	63–27	47–43	39–51	50–40	50–40	48–42	45–45	53–37	42–48	

Legend: Blue = home team win; Yellow = draw; Red = away team win.

=== B fixtures ===
Home \ Away	BV	BRA	COV	CH	IPS	KL	OX	RR	SHE	SWI	WOL
Belle Vue		61–29	53–37	48–42	58–32	58–32	49–41	51–39	51.5–38.5	65–25	46–44
Bradford	40–50		40–50	43–47	n–h	62–28	46–44	41–49	49–41	42–48	57–33
Coventry	46–44	57–33		46–44	50–40	55–35	45–45	56–34	59–31	65–25	44–46
Cradley Heath	50–40	48–41	42–48		57–33	55–35	48–42	47–43	62–28	55–35	53–37
Ipswich	40–50	50–40	40–50	48–41		47–43	42–38	49–38	42–48	42–47	47–43
King's Lynn	56–34	51–39	40–50	44–46	46–44		53–37	42–48	41–49	50–39	46–44
Oxford	50–40	53–33	38–51	43–47	53–37	53.5–36.5		47–42	54–36	41–49	42–48
Reading	43–47	63–2	48–42	49–41	48–42	56–33	42–48		43–7	53–37	49–41
Sheffield	44–46	53–37	42–48	n–h	51–39	58–32	46–43	48–41		60–30	48–42
Swindon	44–46	46–44	40–49	46–44	51–39	40–49	47.5–42.5	46–44	46–44		46–44
Wolverhampton	51–39	64–26	51–39	47–43	52–38	45–45	37–53	47–43	44–46	42–48	

Legend: Blue = home team win; Yellow = draw; Red = away team win.

== British League Knockout Cup ==
The 1988 Speedway Star British League Knockout Cup was the 50th edition of the Knockout Cup for tier one teams. Cradley Heath Heathens were the winners for the third successive year if including the tied 1986 final.

First round

Date	Team one	Score	Team two
09/07	King's Lynn	47-43	Ipswich
08/07	Ipswich	34-55	King's Lynn
23/06	Sheffield	43-47	Cradley Heath
18/06	Cradley Heath	51-39	Sheffield
03/06	Belle Vue	53-37	Bradford
28/05	Bradford	36-54	Belle Vue

Quarter-finals

Date	Team one	Score	Team two
13/08	King's Lynn	40-50	Cradley Heath
10/08	Cradley Heath	53-37	King's Lynn
19/07	Coventry	53-37	Reading
15/07	Belle Vue	53-37	Wolverhampton
14/07	Oxford	48-42	Swindon
11/07	Reading	49-41	Coventry
11/07	Wolverhampton	45-45	Belle Vue

Semi-finals

Date	Team one	Score	Team two
14/10	Belle Vue	48-42	Cradley Heath
13/10	Oxford	38-49	Coventry
08/10	Coventry	44-46	Oxford
14/09	Cradley Heath	49-41	Belle Vue

Final

First leg

22 October 1988

Coventry Bees Tommy Knudsen 11 Kelvin Tatum 11 Rick Miller 6 John Jørgensen 5 Andy Hackett 5 David Clarke 2 Neville Tatum 0	40 - 50	Cradley Heath Alan Grahame 13 Jan O. Pedersen 11 Simon Cross 9 Erik Gundersen 8 David Walsh 7 Gert Handberg 1 Wayne Garratt 1

Brandon Stadium

Second leg

23 October 1988

Cradley Heath Alan Grahame 10 Gert Handberg 9 Simon Cross 8 Erik Gundersen 8 Jan O. Pedersen 7 David Walsh 5 Wayne Garratt 3	50 - 40	Coventry Bees Tommy Knudsen 13 John Jørgensen 9 Andy Hackett 6 David Clarke 6 Kelvin Tatum 5 Rick Miller 1 Neville Tatum 0

Dudley Wood Stadium

Cradley Heath were declared Knockout Cup Champions, winning on aggregate 100-80.

== Riders' Championship ==
Jan O. Pedersen won the British League Riders' Championship. It was the held at Belle Vue Stadium on 9 October.

Pos.	Rider	Heat Scores	Total
1	(Denmark) Jan O. Pedersen	3 2 3 3 3	14
2	(Denmark) Erik Gundersen	3 3 3 1 3	13
3	(Denmark) Hans Nielsen	0 3 3 3 3	12+3
4	(England) Chris Morton	2 2 3 2 3	12+2
5	(United States) Shawn Moran	1 3 2 2 2	10
6	(England) Richard Knight	2 3 1 2 1	9
7	(United States) Ronnie Correy	1 2 2 3 1	9
8	(England) Simon Wigg	2 1 0 3 2	8
9	(England) Kelvin Tatum	2 0 2 2 1	7
10	(Sweden) Per Jonsson	3 2 0 0 0	5
11	(England) Gary Havelock	1 1 0 1 2	5
12	(Sweden) Jan Andersson	1 1 1 1 1	5
13	(United States) Kelly Moran	0 0 2 1 2	5
14	(Denmark) Brian Karger	3 1 1 0 0	5
15	(Denmark) Tommy Knudsen	0 1 0	1
16	(England) Paul Smith (res)	0 0	0
17	(England) Carl Stonehewer (res)	0 0	0
18	(England) Jeremy Doncaster	0 0 0	0

- ef=engine failure, f=fell, x=excluded r-retired

== Leading final averages ==
Rider	Team	Average
(Denmark) Hans Nielsen	Oxford	11.03
(Denmark) Tommy Knudsen	Coventry	10.08
(Denmark) Erik Gundersen	Cradley Heath	10.06
(England) Kelvin Tatum	Coventry	10.04
(Denmark) Jan O. Pedersen	Cradley Heath	9.88
(United States) Shawn Moran	Sheffield	9.51
(United States) Sam Ermolenko	Wolverhampton	9.40
(England) Jeremy Doncaster	Ipswich	9.34
(England) Chris Morton	Belle Vue	9.01
(England) Steve Bastable	Bradford	9.00

== Riders & final averages ==
Belle Vue

- (England) Chris Morton 9.01
- (United States) Mike Faria 8.18
- (Denmark) Peter Ravn 7.70
- (England) Paul Thorp 7.22
- (Sweden) Roland Danno 6.92
- (England) Andy Smith 6.83
- (England) Paul Smith 4.97
- (England) Glenn Hornby 3.12

Bradford

- (England) Gary Havelock 8.30
- (England) Neil Evitts 7.44
- (England) Sean Willmott 6.02
- (United States) Rob Pfetzing 5.67
- (England) Michael Graves 5.29
- (United States) Randy Green 5.15
- (Finland) Olli Tyrväinen 4.64
- (England) Anthony Hulme 3.57

Coventry

- (Denmark) Tommy Knudsen 10.08
- (England) Kelvin Tatum 10.04
- (Denmark) John Jørgensen 7.49
- (United States) Rick Miller 7.02
- (England) Neville Tatum 5.00
- (England) David Clarke 4.85
- (England) Andy Hackett 4.79

Cradley Heath

- (Denmark) Erik Gundersen 10.06
- (Denmark) Jan O. Pedersen 9.88
- (England) Simon Cross 8.22
- (England) Alan Grahame 6.92
- (Denmark) Gert Handberg 5.10
- (England) David Walsh 4.50
- (England) Wayne Garratt 3.45

Ipswich

- (England) Jeremy Doncaster 9.34
- (Finland) Kai Niemi 6.87
- (Italy) Armando Castagna 6.75
- (England) Carl Blackbird 6.19
- (Germany) Gerd Riss 6.07
- (Australia) Steve Regeling 5.40
- (Italy) Paolo Salvatelli 4.97
- (England) Robbie Fuller 2.50
- (England) Nigel Flatman 2.40
- (England) Jonathan Cooper 1.45

King's Lynn

- (United States) Lance King 7.75
- (England) John Davis 7.69
- (England) Richard Knight 7.45
- (Denmark) Bo Petersen 7.26
- (Denmark) Allan Johansen 6.33
- (Australia) Stephen Davies 6.24
- (England) Gordon Kennett 6.00
- (England) Adrian Stevens 3.90
- (England) Roger Horspool 1.28

Oxford

- (Denmark) Hans Nielsen 11.03
- (England) Simon Wigg 8.64
- (England) Marvyn Cox 7.24
- (England) Martin Dugard 6.97
- (England) Nigel De'ath 4.32
- (England) Alastair Stevens 3.91
- (England) Jon Surman 3.81
- (Denmark) Lars Munkedal 2.80
- (England) Peter Lloyd 2.65

Reading

- (Sweden) Per Jonsson 8.98
- (Sweden) Jan Andersson 8.93
- (New Zealand) Mitch Shirra 8.20
- (Sweden) Tony Olsson 6.95
- (England) Malcolm Holloway 5.63
- (England) Dave Mullett 5.22
- (England) Gary Tagg 3.09
- (England) Rodney Payne 2.81

Sheffield

- (United States) Shawn Moran 9.51
- (United States) Kelly Moran 8.67
- (England) Neil Collins 7.16
- (England) Peter Carr 5.78
- (England) Sean Wilson 5.30
- (England) Ian Stead 4.58
- (United States) Randy Green 4.00
- (England) Gordon Whitaker 3.60
- (Italy) Valentino Furlanetto 3.60
- (Norway) Einar Kyllingstad 3.38

Swindon

- (Sweden) Peter Nahlin 7.68 (6 matches only)
- (Denmark) Brian Karger 7.48
- (England) Andrew Silver 7.23
- (Sweden) Jimmy Nilsen 7.22
- (Sweden) Erik Stenlund 6.56
- (Sweden) Richard Hellsen 5.94
- (England) Alun Rossiter 5.87
- (England) Gary Chessell 5.41

Wolverhampton

- (United States) Sam Ermolenko 9.40
- (Denmark) Bo Petersen 7.67
- (United States) Ronnie Correy 7.24
- (Denmark) Jan Stæchmann 6.11
- (Denmark) Preben Eriksen 5.94
- (England) Andy Grahame 5.73
- (England) Andy Phillips 5.51
- (Denmark) Lars Munkedal 5.46
- (Denmark) Peter Glanz 4.42

== See also ==
- List of United Kingdom Speedway League Champions
- Knockout Cup (speedway)
