= 2005 Elite League speedway season =

British motorcycle speedway season

- League: Sky Sports Elite League
- Champions: Coventry Bees
- Knockout Cup: Belle Vue Aces
- Craven Shield: Oxford Silver Machine
- Individual: Nicki Pedersen
- Pairs: Swindon Robins
- Highest average: Nicki Pedersen
- Division/s below: Premier League; Conference League

The 2005 Elite League speedway season was the 71st season of the top division of speedway in the United Kingdom and governed by the Speedway Control Bureau (SCB), in conjunction with the British Speedway Promoters' Association (BSPA).

== Season summary ==
In 2005, the league consisted of ten teams, with the title being decided by a play-off between the top four.

Belle Vue Aces topped the regular season table and won the Knockout Cup. Their world champion rider Jason Crump was in superb form throughout the season. Fellow Australian Leigh Adams topped the league averages for Swindon for arguably the second consecutive season but it was Coventry Bees that experienced their first title success since the glory days of the late 1980s.

Coventry had finished bottom of the table during the previous season and with the exception of finishing runner-up in 2003 had been starved of success. The club made a change that proved instrumental, they brought in Scott Nicholls from Ipswich and supported by Andreas Jonsson and Chris Harris the team defeated Belle Vue in the Elite League Play off final.

== League ==
=== Final table ===
Pos		M	W	D	L	F	A	Pts	Bon	Tot
1	Belle Vue Aces	36	24	0	12	1766	1520	48	13	61
2	Coventry Bees	36	23	0	13	1739	1605	46	13	59
3	Peterborough Panthers	36	21	2	23	1709	1598	44	12	56
4	Eastbourne Eagles	36	19	1	16	1658	1646	39	10	49
5	Poole Pirates	36	18	1	17	1666	1647	37	10	47
6	Ipswich Witches	36	16	3	17	1661	1672	35	9	44
7	Swindon Robins	36	17	2	17	1617	1675	36	7	43
8	Wolverhampton Wolves	36	14	2	20	1682	1647	30	10	40
9	Oxford Silver Machine	36	11	1	24	1550	1773	23	3	26
10	Arena Essex Hammers	36	11	0	25	1539	1804	22	3	25

= Qualified for Play Offs

=== 'A' Fixtures ===
Home \ Away	AE	BV	COV	EAS	IPS	OX	PET	PP	SWI	WOL
Arena Essex Hammers		43–47	42–51	43–47	57–39	41–49	48–42	61–30	53–42	52–41
Belle Vue Aces	63–30		49–41	49–41	50–43	63–28	58–38	55–37	40–32	53–42
Coventry Bees	53–40	38–53		52–41	47–49	51–43	44–51	47–43	54–40	55–39
Eastbourne Eagles	52–42	53–37	42–51		48–45	55–39	51–40	44–46	56–40	45–45
Ipswich Witches	53–41	48–41	51–42	41–50		56–38	45–45	44–49	55–40	51–44
Oxford Silver Machine	46–48	43–52	40–54	50–41	48–46		49–46	49–41	41–49	50–45
Peterborough Panthers	52–39	52–39	52–43	52–43	40–55	48–42		40–50	55–41	47–43
Poole Pirates	55–40	53–41	57–36	50–44	47–43	54–41	52–41		54–40	46–44
Swindon Robins	53–38	46–44	49–41	48–44	49–44	46–43	46–44	45–45		48–42
Wolverhampton Wolves	49–47	40–50	48–45	46–47	47–43	55–38	55–40	56–38	57–33	

Legend: Blue = home team win; Yellow = draw; Red = away team win.

=== 'B' Fixtures ===
Home \ Away	AE	BV	COV	EAS	IPS	OX	PET	PP	SWI	WOL
Arena Essex Hammers		41–51	42–51	43–47	49–41	47–46	39–54	51–44	52–42	36–60
Belle Vue Aces	47–48		51–44	59–35	64–29	52–43	36–39	53–42	52–41	58–38
Coventry Bees	54–42	49–42		58–37	44–46	54–39	53–43	49–44	51–45	48–41
Eastbourne Eagles	56–37	46–43	43–46		58–38	57–35	48–42	46–40	55–39	49–41
Ipswich Witches	64–30	43–47	40–54	55–38		54–40	46–46	51–45	42–42	50–42
Oxford Silver Machine	49–41	41–54	42–52	49–41	45–47		43–47	46–44	51–42	47–43
Peterborough Panthers	61–32	48–42	48–42	62–31	50–43	52–30		48–42	53–43	51–39
Poole Pirates	52–38	53–41	46–47	50–40	44–46	46–44	44–46		50–40	52–43
Swindon Robins	58–35	53–39	47–43	44–46	52–41	54–38	47–43	53–39		48–42
Wolverhampton Wolves	63–31	39–51	38–55	49–41	59–34	45–45	55–41	54–42	53–40	

Legend: Blue = home team win; Yellow = draw; Red = away team win.

=== Play-offs ===
Semi-final decided over one leg. Grand Final decided by aggregate scores over two legs.

Semi-finals

- Belle Vue Aces 53-40 Eastbourne Eagles
- Coventry Bees 55-41 Peterborough Panthers

Final

First leg

19 September 2005

Coventry Bees Sebastian Ułamek 11 Scott Nicholls 10 Morten Risager 9 Billy Janniro 8 Joonas Kylmäkorpi 8 Chris Harris 5 Martin Smolinski 3	54 - 41	Belle Vue Aces Jason Crump 21 Joe Screen 9 Andy Smith 4 Simon Stead 4 Rusty Harrison 2 Jason Lyons 1 R/R

Brandon Stadium

Second leg

26 September 2005

Belle Vue Aces Jason Crump 10 Joe Screen 9 Andy Smith 9 Simon Stead 7 Jason Lyons 4 Rusty Harrison 3 R/R	42 - 47	Coventry Bees Scott Nicholls 11 Chris Harris 9 Billy Janniro 8 Morten Risager 6 Sebastian Ułamek 5 Joonas Kylmäkorpi 4 Martin Smolinski 4

Belle Vue Stadium

The Coventry Bees were declared League Champions, winning on aggregate 101-83.

== Elite League Knockout Cup ==
The 2005 Elite League Knockout Cup was the 67th edition of the Knockout Cup for tier one teams. Belle Vue Aces were the winners of the competition.

First round

Date	Team one	Score	Team two
21/04	Swindon	60-36	Poole
20/04	Poole	51-41	Swindon
07/04	Ipswich	55-40	Wolverhampton
04/04	Wolverhampton	37-53	Ipswich

Quarter-finals

Date	Team one	Score	Team two
15/06	Arena Essex	51-40	Ipswich
12/06	Swindon	55-39	Coventry
26/05	Ipswich	52-42	Arena Essex
21/05	Eastbourne	59-36	Peterborough
20/05	Coventry	51-41	Swindon
19/05	Oxford	49-41	Belle Vue
16/05	Belle Vue	59-35	Oxford
13/05	Peterborough	56-37	Eastbourne

Semi-finals

Date	Team one	Score	Team two
21/09	Arena Essex	52-41	Eastbourne
18/08	Swindon	37-35	Belle Vue
27/07	Belle Vue	61-32	Swindon
23/07	Eastbourne	55-40	Arena Essex

Final

First leg

1 October 2005

Eastbourne Eagles Nicki Pedersen 17 Adam Shields 10 Davey Watt 9 Dean Barker 5 Andrew Moore 5 Daniel Giffard 0 R/R	46 - 44	Belle Vue Aces Jason Crump 16 Jason Lyons 9 Joe Screen 8 Andy Smith 7 Simon Stead 3 Rusty Harrison 1 R/R

Arlington Stadium

Second leg

3 October 2005

Belle Vue Aces Jason Crump 16 Joe Screen 12 Jason Lyons 11 Simon Stead 5 Andy Smith 5 Rusty Harrison 4 R/R	53 - 37	Eastbourne Eagles Nicki Pedersen 11 Adam Shields 7 Davey Watt 6 Travis McGowan 5 Oliver Allen4 Andrew Moore 4 R/R

Belle Vue Stadium

The Belle Vue Aces were declared Knockout Cup Champions, winning on aggregate 97-83.

== Craven Shield ==
- End of season competition

First Round Group A

Team one	Team two	Score
Arena Essex	Ipswich	53–40, 41–49
Poole	Ipswich	58–33, 50–47
Arena Essex	Poole	52–41, n–h

First Round Group B

Team one	Team two	Score
Wolverhampton	Swindon	58–36, 40–54
Oxford	Swindon	41–34, 46–44
Oxford	Wolverhampton	48–42, 45–51

Semi-final 1

Team one	Team two	Team three	Score
Peterborough	Coventry	Poole	38–36–34
Poole	Coventry	Peterborough	38–34–35
Coventry	Peterborough	Poole	34–34–40

Semi-final 2

Team one	Team two	Team three	Score
Eastbourne	Belle Vue	Oxford	37–26–27
Oxford	Belle Vue	Eastbourne	42–32–34
Belle Vue	Eastbourne	Oxford	34–36–38

Final

Team one	Team two	Team three	Score
Eastbourne	Oxford	Poole	41–40–27
Poole	Eastbourne	Oxford	35–34–39
Oxford	Eastbourne	Poole	36–39–33

== Riders' Championship ==
Nicki Pedersen won the Riders' Championship. The final was held in Swindon on 28 August.

Pos.	Rider	Pts	Total	SF	Final
1	(Denmark) Nicki Pedersen	1 3 3 2 3	12	x	3
2	(England) Scott Nicholls	0 3 3 2 2	10	2	2
3	(Sweden) Peter Karlsson	3 1 3 1 2	10	3	1
4	(Denmark) Bjarne Pedersen	3 1 2 3 3	12	x	0
5	(Denmark) Charlie Gjedde	3 1 1 3 3	11	1	
6	(England) Lee Richardson	2 0 3 2 3	10	0	
7	(United States) Greg Hancock	2 3 2 0 2	9		
8	(Australia) Jason Crump	2 2 0 2 2	8		
9	(Poland) Krzysztof Kasprzak	0 3 1 3 1	8		
10	(United States) Billy Hamill	3 2 0 - -	5		
11	(England) Mark Loram	2 2 0 1 0	5		
12	(Czech Republic) Aleš Dryml Jr.	0 1 0 3 0	4		
13	(England) David Howe	1 2 0 0 1	4		
14	(Australia) Davey Watt	1 0 2 1 0	4		
15	(Sweden) Freddie Lindgren	0 0 2 1 1	4		
16	(England) Simon Stead	1 0 1 0 1	3		

== Pairs ==
The Elite League Pairs Championship was held at the East of England Arena on 27 March and was won by Swindon Robins for the second consecutive year.

Group A
Pos	Team	Pts	Riders
1	Arena Essex	26	Rickardsson 15, Havelock 11
2	Wolves	19	Max 11, Howe 8
3	Eastbourne	18	Pedersen N 15, Norris 3
4	Poole	17	Sullivan 8, Pedersen B 9
5	Oxford	10	Hancock 10, McGowan 0

Group B
Pos	Team	Pts	Riders
1	Swindon	27	Adams 14, Richardson 13
2	Belle Vue	18	Crump 9, Screen 9
3	Wolves	19	Max 11, Howe 8
4	Ipswich	16	Andersen 9, Protasiewicz 7
5	Coventry	15	Nicholls 13, Jonsson 2
6	Peterborough	14	Karlsson 10, Ermolenko 4

Semi finals

- Belle Vue 5 Arena Essex 4 - Rickardsson, Screen, Crump, Havelock
- Swindon 7 Wolves 2 - Adams, Richardson, Max Howe

Final

- Swindon 6 Belle Vue 3 - Adams, Crump, Richardson, Screen

== Leading final averages ==
Rider	Team	Average
(Australia) Leigh Adams	Swindon	10.42
(Australia) Jason Crump	Belle Vue	10.35
(Denmark) Nicki Pedersen	Eastbourne	10.30
(England) Scott Nicholls	Coventry	9.45
(Sweden) Peter Karlsson	Peterborough	9.48
(Denmark) Hans Andersen	Ipswich	9.44
(Sweden) Mikael Max	Wolverhampton	9.39
(United States) Greg Hancock	Oxford	9.32
(Denmark) Bjarne Pedersen	Poole	9.27
(England) Lee Richardson	Swindon	8.85

== Riders & final averages ==
Arena Essex

- (Sweden) Tony Rickardsson 10.06
- (England) Mark Loram 8.14
- (England) Gary Havelock 6.43
- (England) Leigh Lanham 6.21
- (Poland) Roman Povazhny 6.05
- (Russia) Sergei Darkin 5.94
- (England) Paul Hurry 5.66
- (Poland) Adam Skórnicki 5.09
- (United States) Josh Larsen 4.96
- (Poland) Piotr Świst 4.48
- (England) Phil Morris 4.20

Belle Vue

- (Australia) Jason Crump 10.35
- (Denmark) Kenneth Bjerre 7.87
- (England) Joe Screen 7.69
- (England) Simon Stead 7.35
- (Australia) Jason Lyons 6.95
- (England) Andy Smith 6.36
- (England) James Wright 5.09
- (Australia) Rusty Harrison 4.43
- (England) Steve Masters 1.50
- (England) Krister Marsh 1.43

Coventry

- (England) Scott Nicholls 9.45
- (Sweden) Andreas Jonsson 8.76
- (Finland) Joonas Kylmäkorpi 7.20
- (Poland) Sebastian Ułamek 7.20
- (United States) Billy Janniro 6.79
- (Australia) Rory Schlein 6.43
- (Denmark) Morten Risager 6.22
- (Czech Republic) Tomáš Topinka 6.00
- (Sweden) Daniel Davidsson 4.20

Eastbourne

- (Denmark) Nicki Pedersen 10.30
- (England) David Norris 7.75
- (Australia) Davey Watt 7.22
- (Australia) Adam Shields 7.11
- (England) Dean Barker 6.45
- (England) Oliver Allen 4.76
- (England) Andrew Moore 4.65
- (Denmark) Steen Jensen 2.56

Ipswich

- (Denmark) Hans N. Andersen 9.44
- (England) Chris Louis 8.43
- (Poland) Piotr Protasiewicz 7.91
- (Poland) Robert Miskowiak 6.99
- (Sweden) Kim Jansson 5.91
- (Poland) Mariusz Puszakowski 5.27
- (England) Danny King 3.82
- (Australia) Kevin Doolan 3.28
- (Poland) Karol Baran 3.16

Oxford

- (United States) Greg Hancock 9.32
- (United States) Billy Hamill 7.95
- (Denmark) Niels Kristian Iversen 7.45
- (Australia) Travis McGowan 6.36
- (Denmark) Jesper B. Jensen 6.24
- (Sweden) Henka Gustaffson 6.22
- (Sweden) Stefan Andersson 5.09
- (Denmark) Tom P. Madsen 4.15
- (Poland) Tomasz Bajerski 4.00
- (Czech Republic) Luboš Tomíček Jr. 3.06
- (England) Chris Mills 2.67
- (Germany) Tobias Kroner 1.28

Peterborough

- (Sweden) Peter Karlsson 9.48
- (Czech Republic) Aleš Dryml Jr. 8.19
- (Denmark) Jesper B. Jensen 7.38
- (Finland) Joonas Kylmäkorpi 7.21
- (Czech Republic) Lukáš Dryml 7.10
- (United States) Sam Ermolenko 6.62
- (Denmark) Henning Bager 6.05
- (Sweden) Daniel Davidsson 2.95
- (England) Paul Lee 2.05

Poole

- (Denmark) Bjarne Pedersen 9.27
- (Poland) Krzysztof Kasprzak 8.13
- (Australia) Ryan Sullivan 7.78
- (Sweden) Antonio Lindbäck 7.38
- (Slovenia) Matej Ferjan 6.26
- (England) Edward Kennett 5.28
- (England) Ricky Ashworth 4.35
- (England) Ray Morton 3.69
- (Sweden) Tobias Johansson 2.13

Swindon

- (Australia) Leigh Adams 10.42
- (England) Lee Richardson 8.85
- (Denmark) Charlie Gjedde 8.48
- (Sweden) Jonas Davidsson 4.59
- (Denmark) Mads Korneliussen 4.38
- (France) Sebastien Tresarrieu 4.10
- (Sweden) Sebastian Aldén 3.93
- (Sweden) Peter Ljung 3.89
- (England) Oliver Allen 3.76
- (England) Tommy Allen 1.67

Wolverhampton

- (Denmark) Mikael Max 8.82
- (Sweden) Freddie Lindgren 7.44
- (England) David Howe 6.98
- (Australia) Steve Johnston 6.65
- (United States) Ronnie Correy 6.36
- (Sweden) Magnus Karlsson 5.61
- (Poland) Krzysztof Pecyna 5.23

== See also ==
- Speedway in the United Kingdom
- List of United Kingdom Speedway League Champions
- Knockout Cup (speedway)
