= Jim Lightfoot =

Jim Lightfoot may refer to:

- Jim Ross Lightfoot, U.S. Representative from Iowa
- Jim Lightfoot (speedway rider), English speedway rider
