= 1987 British League season =

British motorcycle speedway season

- League: British League
- No. of competitors: 12
- Champions: Coventry Bees
- Knockout Cup: Cradley Heathens
- League Cup: Coventry Bees
- Individual: Hans Nielsen
- Pairs: Oxford Cheetahs
- Midland Cup: Cradley Heathens
- Highest average: Hans Nielsen
- Division/s below: 1987 National League

The 1987 British League season was the 53rd season of the top tier of speedway in the United Kingdom and the 23rd known as the British League.

== Summary ==
Coventry Bees comfortably won the league finishing 16 points clear of Cradley Heath. The same five main riders who made up the 1986 team rode through the 1987 season but crucially four of them improved on their 1986 averages. Tommy Knudsen and Kelvin Tatum both hit over 10, while Rick Miller and David Bargh both improved by about 2 points on average. John Jørgensen also remained consistent for the Bees. Coventry also won the League Cup but lost to Cradley in the final of the Knockout Cup. The double defending champions Oxford Cheetahs were forced to release Simon Wigg to Hackney and Per Sorensen because of the 45 point limit. They finished second from bottom despite Hans Nielsen topping the averages once again.

The second leg replay of the League Cup final was the last ever meeting held at Hyde Road.

== Final table ==
Pos	Team	PL	W	D	L	BP	Pts
1	Coventry Bees	22	19	3	0	11	52
2	Cradley Heath Heathens	22	13	1	8	9	36
3	Swindon Robins	22	12	2	8	7	33
4	Sheffield Tigers	22	13	0	9	6	32
5	Bradford Dukes	22	10	3	9	7	30
6	Ipswich Witches	22	10	3	9	6	29
7	Reading Racers	22	11	2	9	4	28
8	Belle Vue Aces	22	10	1	11	5	26
9	Hackney Kestrels	22	7	3	12	3	20
10	Wolverhampton Wolves	22	6	2	14	3	17
11	Oxford Cheetahs	22	6	1	15	3	16
12	King's Lynn Stars	22	4	1	17	2	11

M = Matches; W = Wins; D = Draws; L = Losses; Pts = Total Points

== Fixtures and results ==
Home \ Away	BV	BRA	COV	CH	HAC	IPS	KL	OX	RR	SHE	SWI	WOL
Belle Vue		46–32	39–39	37–41	45–33	43–35	42–36	42–36	41–37	44–34	41–36	38–40
Bradford	53–25		29–49	42–36	49–29	39–39	46–32	52–26	47–31	47–31	44–34	53–24
Coventry	46–32	53–25		44–34	50–28	44–34	50–28	44–34	42–36	48–30	42–36	45–33
Cradley Heath	47–31	39–39	38–40		43–35	44–34	43–35	43–35	41–37	45–32	50–27	52–26
Hackney	35–43	39–39	34–44	41–36		38–38	43–35	40–38	40–38	37–40	40–38	45–33
Ipswich	38–40	42–36	39–39	41–37	50–28		50–27	42–36	46–32	33–45	37–41	43–35
King's Lynn	46–32	42–36	34–44	29–49	44–34	36–42		43–35	35–43	34–44	23–55	39–39
Oxford	43–35	41–37	35–43	40–38	35–43	38–40	44–34		36–42	40–38	38–40	47–31
Reading	40–38	49–29	39–39	40–38	51–27	41–37	53–25	40–38		40–38	36.5–41.5	41–37
Sheffield	42–36	42–36	36–42	41–37	46–32	46–32	42–36	43–35	40–37		42–36	55–23
Swindon	41–37	48–30	36–42	36–42	39–39	41–37	48–30	42–36	39–39	48–29		40–38
Wolverhampton	42–36	35–42	37–41	34–44	43–35	33–45	44–34	39–39	46–32	42–35	36–42	

Legend: Blue = home team win; Yellow = draw; Red = away team win.

== British League Knockout Cup ==
The 1987 Speedway Star British League Knockout Cup was the 49th edition of the Knockout Cup for tier one teams. Cradley Heath Heathens were the winners for the second successive year if including the tied 1986 final.

First round

Date	Team one	Score	Team two
10/07	Hackney	48-42	Bradford
10/07	Oxford	51-39	Belle Vue
04/07	Kings Lynn	41-49	Sheffield
13/06	Swindon	47-43	Wolverhampton
04/06	Sheffield	51-39	Kings Lynn
01/06	Wolverhampton	44-46	Swindon
30/05	Belle Vue	47-43	Oxford
30/05	Bradford	49-41	Hackney

Quarter-finals

Date	Team one	Score	Team two
15/09	Bradford	41-49	Cradley Heath
15/08	Swindon	43-47	Reading
07/08	Oxford	48-42	Ipswich
06/08	Ipswich	47-43	Oxford
05/08	Cradley Heath	55-35	Bradford
27/07	Reading	48-41	Swindon
13/07	Sheffield	48-42	Coventry
11/07	Coventry	51-38	Sheffield

Semi-finals

Date	Team one	Score	Team two
30/09	Coventry	48-42	Reading
30/09	Oxford	47-43	Cradley Heath
16/09	Cradley Heath	39-33 A	Oxford
07/09	Reading	47-43	Coventry

Final

First leg

20 October 1987

Coventry Bees Tommy Knudsen 17 John Jørgensen 8 David Bargh 8 David Clarke 6 Wayne Broadhurst 3 Rick Miller 3 Kelvin Tatum 0 (inj)	45 - 45	Cradley Heath David Walsh 12 Erik Gundersen 11 Jan O. Pedersen 11 Simon Cross 8 Jan Jakobsen 2 Paul Fry 1 Nigel Leaver 0

Brandon Stadium

Second leg

21 October 1987

Cradley Heath Erik Gundersen 11 Jan O. Pedersen 11 David Walsh 11 Simon Cross 9 Paul Fry 4 Jan Jakobsen 2 Nigel Leaver 1	49 - 41	Coventry Bees Tommy Knudsen 16 Kelly Moran (guest) 7 David Bargh 7 John Jørgensen 5 David Clarke 3 Rick Miller 3 Wayne Broadhurst 3

Dudley Wood Stadium

Cradley Heath were declared Knockout Cup Champions, winning on aggregate 94-86.

== League Cup ==
The League Cup was contested as a league format. Coventry Bees won the final over two legs defeating Belle Vue Aces 84–72 on aggregate. It was the last time that the competition was contested.

Qualifying table

Pos	Team	PL	W	D	L	Pts
1	Coventry Bees	22	16	1	5	43
2	Oxford Cheetahs	22	14	2	6	39
3	Belle Vue Aces	22	14	1	7	38
4	Cradley Heathens	22	14	0	8	36
5	Sheffield Tigers	22	13	2	7	33
6	Reading Racers	22	12	1	9	31
7	Swindon Robins	22	9	2	11	26
8	Wolverhampton Wolves	22	9	1	12	23
9	Bradford Dukes	22	8	2	12	22
10	Hackney Kestrels	22	6	2	14	17
11	King's Lynn Stars	22	5	1	16	12
11	Ipswich Witches	22	4	1	17	10

Results

Home \ Away	BV	BRA	COV	CH	HAC	IPS	KL	OX	RR	SHE	SWI	WOL
Belle Vue		51–27	43–34	41–37	49–29	44–34	50–28	41–37	50–28	39–39	45–33	60–18
Bradford	38–40		41–37	37–41	38–40	48–30	44–34	48–30	37–41	39–39	42–36	42–36
Coventry	43–35	50–28		52–26	47–31	54–24	53–25	44–34	43–35	47–31	40–38	47–31
Cradley Heath	40–38	43–35	38–40		52–26	47–31	44–34	37–41	41–37	44–34	40–38	48–30
Hackney	33–45	39–39	39–39	43–35		39–38	51–27	38–40	38–40	35–43	40–38	43–35
Ipswich	38–40	38–39	40–38	38–40	50–28		38–39	43–35	37–41	38–40	41–37	39–39
King's Lynn	37–41	42–36	36–42	37–41	41–37	43–34		39–39	36–42	27–50	33–45	50–28
Oxford	45–33	42–36	37–41	40–38	43–35	48–30	43–35		44–34	42–36	40–38	44–34
Reading	45–33	45–32	34–44	41–37	43–35	48–30	47–30	33–45		38–40	41–37	51–27
Sheffield	45–31	38–40	44–34	38–40	45–33	45–32	45–33	42–36	43–35		43–35	43–34
Swindon	42–36	45–33	36–42	40–38	44–34	44–34	46–32	39–39	39–39	45–33		45–33
Wolverhampton	42–36	48–30	46–32	37–41	42–35	45–33	51–27	38–40	49–29	45–33	40–38	

Legend: Blue = home team win; Yellow = draw; Red = away team win.

Semi-finals

Team one	Team two	Scores
Oxford	Belle Vue	42–36, 34–44
Coventry	Cradley Heath	45–33, 42–36

Final

Date	Team one	Score	Team two
15/09	Coventry	41–37	Belle Vue
18/10	Belle Vue	41–37	Coventry

Replay first leg

24 October 1987

Coventry Bees Tommy Knudsen 11 Kelvin Tatum 11 Rick Miller 8 David Bargh 7 John Jørgensen 6 David Clarke 3 Wayne Broadhurst 0	46 - 32	Belle Vue Peter Ravn 11 Paul Thorp 7 Andy Smith 5 Chris Morton 4 Kenny McKinna 4 Glen Hornby 1 David Blackburn 0

Brandon Stadium

Replay second leg

1 November 1987

Belle Vue Chris Morton 14 Peter Ravn 11 Kenny McKinna 8 Richard Knight 4 Glen Hornby 2 David Blackburn 1 Bernie Collier 0	40 - 38	Coventry Bees David Bargh 10 Tommy Knudsen 8 Kelvin Tatum 8 Rick Miller 5 John Jørgensen 4 David Clarke 3 Wayne Broadhurst 0

Hyde Road

Coventry were declared League Cup winners, winning on aggregate 84-72.

== Riders' Championship ==
Hans Nielsen won the British League Riders' Championship for the second successive year. It was the held at Hyde Road on 12 October, shortly before the venue closed for good.

Pos.	Rider	Heat Scores	Total
1	(Denmark) Hans Nielsen	3 2 3 3 3	14
2	(England) Chris Morton	3 3 1 3 3	13
3	(United States) Kelly Moran	2 2 2 2 3	11+3
4	(England) Kelvin Tatum	2 3 2 2 2	11+2
5	(Denmark) Tommy Knudsen	TX 2 3 3 2	10
6	(England) Richard Knight	3 1 1 3 2	10
7	(Sweden) Jan Andersson	1 1 3 2 3	10
8	(New Zealand) Mitch Shirra	1 3 3 0 1	8
9	(England) Simon Wigg	1 2 2 1 1	7
10	(Denmark) Jan O. Pedersen	2 3 0 1 0	6
11	(England) Sean Willmott	2 1 1 1 1	6
12	(Sweden) Jimmy Nilsen	0 TX 0 2 2	4
13	(Denmark) Preben Eriksen	1 0 2 1 0	4
14	(Denmark) Erik Gundersen	3 0 0 0 1	4
15	(England) Bernie Collier (res)	0 0 1 1 0 0	2
16	(England) Louis Carr	0 - - - - -	0
17	(United States) Shawn Moran	0 0 0 0 0	0

- ef=engine failure, f=fell, x=excluded r-retired

== Pairs ==
The British League Pairs Championship was held at Smallmead Stadium on 12 July and was won by Oxford for the third consecutive year.

Group A
Pos	Team	Pts	Riders
1	Cradley	17	Pedersen 9 Gundersen 8
2	Belle Vue	14	Thorp 10; Morton 4
3	Sheffield	12	Moran S 12; Carr 0
4	King's Lynn	11	Knight 6 Regeling 5

Group B
Pos	Team	Pts	Riders
1	Oxford	17	Nielsen 12; Grahame 5
2	Swindon	16	Shirra 9 Nilsen 7
3	Hackney	14	Galvin 8 Wigg 6
4	Bradford	5	King 3 Evitts 2

Group C
Pos	Team	Pts	Riders
1	Wolves	14	Eriksen 9 Ermolenko 5
2	Coventry	14	Tatum 8 Knudsen 6
3	Reading	13	Jonsson 7 Andersson 6
4	Ipswich	13	Doncaster 8 Niemi 5

Semi Final
Pos	Team	Pts	Riders
1	Swindon	16	Shirra 8, Nilsen 8
2	Oxford	14	Nielsen 12 Grahame 2
3	Cradley	13	Pedersen 7, Gundersen 6
4	Wolverhampton	11	Ermolenko 11, Eriksen 0

Final

In the final Nilsen fell and was excluded and Shirra touched the tapes and was excluded, leaving Nielsen and Grahame to complete a 7-0 (pts) uncontested heat.

== Leading final averages ==
Rider	Team	Average
(Denmark) Hans Nielsen	Oxford	11.38
(Denmark) Erik Gundersen	Cradley Heath	10.44
(Denmark) Tommy Knudsen	Coventry	10.25
(England) Kelvin Tatum	Coventry	10.06
(United States) Sam Ermolenko	Wolverhampton	9.86
(England) Jeremy Doncaster	Ipswich	9.67
(Sweden) Jimmy Nilsen	Swindon	9.61
(Denmark) Jan O. Pedersen	Cradley Heath	9.60
(United States) Shawn Moran	Sheffield	9.47
(England) Simon Wigg	Hackney	9.38

== Midland Cup ==
Cradley Heath won the Midland Cup. The competition consisted of six teams.

First round

Team one	Team two	Score
Reading	Swindon	38–39, 37–41
Wolverhampton	Cradley	38–39, 31–47

Semi final round

Team one	Team two	Score
Coventry	Swindon	48–30, 36–42
Cradley	Oxford	43–35, 40–38

=== Final ===
Because of cancellations due to bad weather the final of the competition doubled up as the Knockout Cup final (see above for details).

== Riders & final averages ==
Belle Vue

- (England) Chris Morton 8.92
- (England) Paul Thorp 8.41
- (Denmark) Peter Ravn 8.38
- (England) Andy Smith 6.35
- (Scotland) Kenny McKinna 5.82
- (England) Carl Blackbird 5.55
- (England) David Blackburn 3.92
- (England) Glenn Hornby 2.65

Bradford

- (England) Neil Evitts 8.58
- (United States) Lance King 8.47
- (England) Sean Willmott 7.35
- (England) Gary Havelock 7.31
- (England) Steve Bastable 5.73
- (United States) Randy Green 5.71
- (England) Michael Graves 4.97
- (England) Anthony Hulme 1.48

Coventry

- (Denmark) Tommy Knudsen 10.25
- (England) Kelvin Tatum 10.06
- (United States) Rick Miller 8.20
- (Denmark) John Jørgensen 7.80
- (New Zealand) David Bargh 7.46
- (England) David Clarke 3.44
- (England) Andy Hackett 2.58
- (England) Wayne Broadhurst 2.18
- (England) Darren Slater 2.13

Cradley Heath

- (Denmark) Erik Gundersen 10.44
- (Denmark) Jan O. Pedersen 9.60
- (England) Simon Cross 9.33
- (England) David Walsh 5.10
- (England) Alan Grahame 4.94
- (Denmark) Jan Jakobsen 3.94
- (England) Dean Barker 3.79
- (England) Paul Fry 3.47
- (England) Wayne Garratt 1.18

Hackney

- (England) Simon Wigg 9.38
- (Sweden) Roland Danno 7.03
- (England) Andy Galvin 6.10
- (Denmark) Allan Johansen 5.60
- (England) Malcolm Simmons 5.40
- (England) Alan Mogridge 5.22
- (England) Barry Thomas 5.20
- (England) Mark Loram 5.08

Ipswich

- (England) Jeremy Doncaster 9.67
- (Italy) Armando Castagna 8.00
- (Finland) Kai Niemi 7.61
- (Germany) Gerd Riss 6.39
- (England) Andy Hines 5.03
- (England) Louis Carr 4.58
- (England) Martin Hagon 4.05
- (England) Robbie Fuller 3.97
- (England) Jamie Luckhurst 2.20

King's Lynn

- (England) Richard Knight 8.35
- (United States) John Cook 6.67
- (Australia) Steve Regeling 6.42
- (England) Ian Barney 6.25
- (England) Andy Campbell 5.34
- (Australia) Stephen Davies 5.27
- (Norway) Einar Kyllingstad 4.94
- (Australia) Mick Poole 4.93
- (England) Ray Morton 4.39

Oxford

- (Denmark) Hans Nielsen 11.38
- (England) Marvyn Cox 8.53
- (England) Andy Grahame 7.87
- (Denmark) Jens Rasmussen 5.68
- (England) Nigel De'ath 4.39
- (England) Kevin Smart 3.72
- (England) Alastair Stevens 3.63
- (England) Jon Surman 3.04

Reading

- (Sweden) Per Jonsson 9.34
- (Sweden) Jan Andersson 8.99
- (England) John Davis 6.95
- (Sweden) Tony Olsson 6.60
- (Denmark) Peter Glanz 6.45
- (England) Malcolm Holloway 6.02
- (England) Gary Tagg 2.57
- (England) Rodney Payne 1.33

Sheffield

- (United States) Shawn Moran 9.47
- (United States) Kelly Moran 9.23
- (England) Neil Collins 7.59
- (England) Peter Carr 7.26
- (England) Sean Wilson 5.50
- (England) Ian Stead 4.72
- (England) Adrian Stevens 3.88

Swindon

- (Sweden) Jimmy Nilsen 9.61
- (New Zealand) Mitch Shirra 9.36
- (England) Andrew Silver 7.35
- (Sweden) Richard Hellsen 6.73
- (Denmark) Brian Karger 6.55
- (England) Alun Rossiter 6.37
- (Sweden) Conny Ivarsson 5.73
- (England) Matthew Cross 1.54
- (New Zealand) Stephen Rose 0.63

Wolverhampton

- (United States) Sam Ermolenko 9.86
- (Denmark) Preben Eriksen 7.28
- (United States) Ronnie Correy 6.33
- (Denmark) Jan Stæchmann 6.01
- (Denmark) Lars Munkedal 5.48
- (England) Andy Phillips 4.74
- (England) Chris Cobby 3.20
- (England) Andy Sumner 1.26
- (Denmark) Torben Hansen 0.40

== See also ==
- List of United Kingdom Speedway League Champions
- Knockout Cup (speedway)
