= Krzysztof Pecyna =

Polish speedway rider

- Born: 14 September 1978 (age 48); Piła, Poland
- Nationality: Polish

Career history

Poland
- 1996-1998, 2003, 2008-2010, 2013: Piła
- 1999-2000, 2002, 2004: Gdańsk
- 2001: Leszno
- 2005: Gorzów
- 2006: Gniezno
- 2009: Krosno
- 2011: Ostrów
- 2012: Opole

Great Britain
- 2005, 2006: Wolverhampton Wolves

Denmark
- 2010: Vojens

Sweden
- 2000: Vargarna
- 2000-2001: Piraterna

Krzysztof Pecyna (born 14 September 1978) is a former motorcycle speedway rider from Poland.

== Speedway career ==
Pecyna began his career riding for Polonia Piła in 1996 and would continue to have a significant link to the club, riding until 1998 and then returning in 2003, from 2008 to 2010 and 2013, the last being his final season in speedway before retiring.

Pecyna rode in the top tier of British Speedway riding for the Wolverhampton Wolves during the 2005 Elite League speedway season and 2006 Elite League speedway season.
