= 2010 Elite League speedway season =

British motorcycle speedway season

- League: Sky Sports Elite League
- Champions: Coventry Bees
- Knockout Cup: Poole Pirates
- Elite Shield: Wolverhampton Wolves
- Individual: Freddie Lindgren
- Pairs: Coventry Bees
- Highest average: Freddie Lindgren
- Division/s below: 2010 Premier League; 2010 National League

The 2010 Elite League speedway season (also known as the Sky Sports Elite League for sponsorship reasons) was the 76th season of the top division of UK speedway and the 14th since its establishment in 1997.

== Summary ==
The first fixtures of the season took place on 29 March and the season ended on 27 October. The Wolverhampton Wolves were the defending champions from 2009.

The negative side of playoffs was experienced during the 2010 season when Coventry Bees claimed the title. Coventry had finished in the fourth and final play off spot, 26 points behind regular season table winners Poole Pirates, who in turn had finished 20 points ahead of their nearest rivals racking up 78 points in total. Coventry went on to win their semi final and then defeat Poole in the final. Although Poole won the Knockout Cup there was a distinct feeling of an injustice. Poole's Australian contingent of Chris Holder, Darcy Ward, Davey Watt and Jason Doyle had been consistent all season except during the play off final and Coventry's Polish duo of Krzysztof Kasprzak and Przemysław Pawlicki both hit great form on the night.

== League table ==
| Pos | Club | M | Home | | | | Away | | | | | F | A | +/- | Pts |
| Pos | Club | M | 3W | 2W | D | L | 4W | 3W | D | 1L | L | F | A | +/- | Pts |
|---|---|---|---|---|---|---|---|---|---|---|---|---|---|---|---|
| 1 | Poole Pirates | 32 | 16 | 0 | 0 | 0 | 5 | 2 | 0 | 4 | 5 | 1667 | 1278 | | 78 |
| 2 | Wolverhampton Wolves | 32 | 15 | 1 | 0 | 0 | 0 | 3 | 1 | 3 | 9 | 1527 | 1432 | | 61 |
| 3 | Peterborough Panthers | 32 | 12 | 2 | 0 | 2 | 2 | 1 | 0 | 2 | 11 | 1495 | 1464 | | 53 |
| 4 | Coventry Bees | 32 | 9 | 2 | 1 | 4 | 2 | 4 | 0 | 0 | 10 | 1469 | 1475 | | 52 |
| 5 | Lakeside Hammers | 32 | 11 | 2 | 1 | 2 | 1 | 1 | 1 | 1 | 12 | 1447 | 1503 | | 48 |
| 6 | Swindon Robins | 32 | 8 | 2 | 0 | 6 | 1 | 2 | 2 | 2 | 9 | 1476 | 1493 | | 44 |
| 7 | Eastbourne Eagles | 32 | 9 | 3 | 2 | 2 | 0 | 1 | 0 | 3 | 12 | 1406 | 1533 | | 41 |
| 8 | Belle Vue Aces | 32 | 10 | 2 | 1 | 3 | 0 | 1 | 0 | 2 | 13 | 1413 | 1539 | | 40 |
| 9 | Ipswich Witches | 32 | 4 | 5 | 0 | 7 | 0 | 0 | 1 | 2 | 13 | 1386 | 1569 | | 26 |

Key:
Championship play-offs
Relegation play-offs

Home: 3W = Home win by 7 points or more; 2W = Home win by between 1 and 6 points
Away: 4W = Away win by 7 points or more; 3W = Away win by between 1 and 6 points; 1L = Away loss by 6 points or less
M = Meetings; D = Draws; L = Losses; F = Race points for; A = Race points against; +/- = Race points difference; Pts = Total Points

=== 'A' Fixtures ===
| Home \ Away | BV | COV | EAS | IPS | LH | PET | PP | SWI | WOL |
|---|---|---|---|---|---|---|---|---|---|
| Belle Vue Aces | | 51–41 | 59–36 | 55–37 | 57–38 | 51–41 | 36–55 | 51–39 | 47–43 |
| Coventry Bees | 42–48 | | 53–40 | 50–44 | 53–40 | 41–51 | 39–54 | 49–46 | 44–46 |
| Eastbourne Eagles | 55–41 | 50–40 | | 45–45 | 45–45 | 47–43 | 49–41 | 43–47 | 45–48 |
| Ipswich Witches | 51–42 | 45–47 | 49–43 | | 43–50 | 50–43 | 44–46 | 46–47 | 50–43 |
| Lakeside Hammers | 54–40 | 59–32 | 53–43 | 49–43 | | 58–37 | 53–40 | 55–40 | 51–44 |
| Peterborough Panthers | 51–41 | 50–40 | 43–47 | 51–42 | 56–39 | | 47–43 | 57–36 | 57–36 |
| Poole Pirates | 59–36 | 63–29 | 63–29 | 63–30 | 70–24 | 54–39 | | 58–35 | 57–35 |
| Swindon Robins | 57–38 | 42–48 | 60–36 | 56–36 | 44–46 | 54–39 | 44–52 | | 51–45 |
| Wolverhampton Wolves | 50–43 | 56–38 | 46–44 | 54–39 | 56–38 | 55–40 | 50–43 | 50–42 | |

Legend: Blue = home team win; Yellow = draw; Red = away team win.

=== 'B' Fixtures ===
| Home \ Away | BV | COV | EAS | IPS | LH | PET | PP | SWI | WOL |
|---|---|---|---|---|---|---|---|---|---|
| Belle Vue Aces | | 37–53 | 55–35 | 51–44 | 47–37 | 56–38 | 48–44 | 39–53 | 45–45 |
| Coventry Bees | 65–27 | | 58–35 | 52–44 | 51–41 | 58–34 | 53–42 | 45–45 | 52–43 |
| Eastbourne Eagles | 57–35 | 56–39 | | 50–42 | 53–40 | 56–37 | 48–42 | 47–43 | 49–41 |
| Ipswich Witches | 48–42 | 41–49 | 47–43 | | 49–43 | 50–46 | 33–59 | 56–37 | 44–46 |
| Lakeside Hammers | 49–44 | 49–41 | 49–41 | 55–37 | | 39–51 | 43–46 | 45–45 | 49–41 |
| Peterborough Panthers | 54–40 | 44–46 | 57–36 | 50–39 | 51–42 | | 49–44 | 51–42 | 57–35 |
| Poole Pirates | 55–37 | 58–35 | 61–31 | 52–40 | 56–33 | 50–39 | | 51–41 | 53–39 |
| Swindon Robins | 57–35 | 44–46 | 50–34 | 53–40 | 51–44 | 47–49 | 40–53 | | 48–45 |
| Wolverhampton Wolves | 56–39 | 50–40 | 61–29 | 57–38 | 56–37 | 50–43 | 50–40 | 55–40 | |

Legend: Blue = home team win; Yellow = draw; Red = away team win.

== Championship play-offs ==
Semi-finals

Leg 1

13 September 2010 | report | Wolverhampton Wolves | 44.5 – 44.5 | Poole Pirates | Monmore Green, Wolverhampton; Referee(s): Craig Ackroyd
Freddie Lindgren 14.5 | Bjarne Pedersen 10

13 September 2010 | report | Coventry Bees | 52 – 38 | Peterborough Panthers | Brandon stadium, Brandon
Krzysztof Kasprzak 10+1 | Rory Schlein 10

Leg 2

20 September 2010 | Poole Pirates | 53 – 41 | Wolverhampton Wolves | Referee(s): Mick Bates
Bjarne Pedersen 13 | Freddie Lindgren 14+1

20 September 2010 | Peterborough Panthers | 44 - 49 | Coventry Bees | Referee(s): Jim Lawrence
Krzysztof Buczkowski 14+1 | Chris Harris 13

Grand final

First leg

27 September 2010; 19.30 | Coventry Bees | 51 - 39 | Poole Pirates | Referee(s): Daniel Holt

| 1 | Krzysztof Kasprzak | 3, 2, 3, X, 3 | 11 |
| 2 | Richard Sweetman | 1, 1', 1 | 3+1 |
| 3 | Ben Barker | 0, 3, 0, X | 3 |
| 4 | Edward Kennett | 2, 2', 2, 1' | 7+2 |
| 5 | Chris Harris | 2', 1', 1', 3, X | 7+3 |
| 6 | Lewis Bridger | 3, 2, 1, 2, 2 | 10 |
| 7 | Przemysław Pawlicki | 2', 3, 3, 2 | 10+1 |
Manager: Alun Rossiter

| 1 | Chris Holder | 2, 0, 3, 2, X | 7 |
| 2 | Darcy Ward | X, 1, F, 0 | 1 |
| 3 | Artur Mroczka | 1, 0, 0 | 1 |
| 4 | Bjarne Pedersen | 3, 3, 4^, 3, 2 | 15 |
| 5 | Davey Watt | 0, 3, 3, X | 6 |
| 6 | Leon Madsen | 0, 0, 1, 3 | 4 |
| 7 | Jason Doyle | 1, 1, 2, 1, F | 5 |
Manager: Neil Middleditch

Second leg

4 October 2010; 19.30 | Poole Pirates | 40 (79) - 50 (101) | Coventry Bees | Referee(s): Peter Clarke

| 1 | Chris Holder | 1, 2, 1, 1, 0 | 5 |
| 2 | Darcy Ward | 3, 1', 2, 0 | 6+1 |
| 3 | Artur Mroczka | 2', 0, 0 | 2+1 |
| 4 | Bjarne Pedersen | 3, 2, 2, 0, 1 | 8 |
| 5 | Davey Watt | 3, 2', 3, 0 | 8+1 |
| 6 | Leon Madsen | 2, 3, 0, 1, 1 | 7 |
| 7 | Jason Doyle | 0, 1, 0, 3 | 4 |
Manager: Neil Middleditch

| 1 | Krzysztof Kasprzak | 2, 3, 2, 3, 3 | 13 |
| 2 | Richard Sweetman | 0, 1, 1, 1' | 3+1 |
| 3 | Ben Barker | 1, 0, 0, 2' | 3+1 |
| 4 | Edward Kennett R/R |
| 5 | Chris Harris | Fx, 3, 3, 3, 2', 2' | 13+2 |
| 6 | Lewis Bridger | 1, 0, 0, 1 | 2 |
| 7 | Przemysław Pawlicki | 3, 2, 1, 3, 2', 2, 3 | 16+1 |
Manager: Alun Rossiter

Coventry were declared Elite League Champions, on Aggregate 101-79.

== Elite League Knockout Cup ==
The 2010 Elite League Knockout Cup was the 72nd edition of the Knockout Cup for tier one teams. Poole Pirates were the winners of the competition.

First round

| Date | Team one | Score | Team two |
|---|---|---|---|
| 12/04 | Wolverhampton | 56-39 | Ipswich |
| 08/04 | Ipswich | 43-46 | Wolverhampton |

Quarter-finals

| Date | Team one | Score | Team two |
|---|---|---|---|
| 10/06 | Swindon | 49-41 | Peterborough |
| 17/09 | Peterborough | 58-37 | Swindon |
| 05/07 | Belle Vue | 50-40 | Poole |
| 21/07 | Poole | 57-35 | Belle Vue |
| 19/07 | Coventry | 48-42 | Wolverhampton |
| 30/09 | Wolverhampton | 51-43 | Coventry |
| 23/09 | Eastbourne | 53-41 | Lakeside |
| 24/09 | Lakeside | 45-45 | Eastbourne |

Semi-finals

| Date | Team one | Score | Team two |
|---|---|---|---|
| 13/10 | Poole | 58-36 | Peterborough |
| 11/10 | Peterborough | 43-50 | Poole |
| 11/10 | Wolverhampton | 44-46 | Eastbourne |
| 10/10 | Eastbourne | 63-29 | Wolverhampton |

=== Final ===
First leg

24 October 2010

Eastbourne; Matej Žagar 11; Joonas Kylmakorpi 10; Cameron Woodward 9 Lewis Bridger 9 Simon Gustafsson 7 Ricky Kling 3 | 49 - 41 | Poole; Chris Holder 10; Davey Watt 9 Darcy Ward 6 Leon Madsen 6 Jason Doyle 5 Bjarne Pedersen 4 Artur Mroczka 1 | Arlington Stadium

Second leg

27 October 2010

Poole; Bjarne Pedersen 12; Chris Holder 11; Leon Madsen 11; Darcy Ward 9 Davey Watt 7 Jason Doyle 4 | 54 - 41 | Eastbourne; Joonas Kylmakorpi 14; Lewis Bridger 9 Cameron Woodward 7 Matej Žagar 6 Simon Gustafsson 5 Ricky Kling 0 | Wimborne Road

The Poole Pirates were declared Knockout Cup Champions, winning on aggregate 95-90.

== Riders' Championship ==
Freddie Lindgren won the Riders' Championship. The final was held at East of England Arena on 16 October.

| Pos. | Rider | Pts | Total | SF | Final |
|---|---|---|---|---|---|
| 1 | (Sweden) Freddie Lindgren | 3 2 0 3 3 | 11 | x | 3 |
| 2 | (England) Chris Harris | 2 3 3 2 3 | 13 | x | 2 |
| 3 | (Denmark) Kenneth Bjerre | 3 2 0 3 2 | 10 | 2 | 1 |
| 4 | (Denmark) Bjarne Pedersen | 3 0 1 3 3 | 10 | 3 | 0 |
| 5 | (Australia) Chris Holder | 3 0 3 1 1 | 8 | 1 | |
| 6 | (England) Scott Nicholls | 2 3 2 1 2 | 10 | 0 | |
| 7 | (England) Simon Stead | 1 2 1 2 2 | 8 | | |
| 8 | (Finland) Kauko Nieminen | 1 2 2 0 3 | 8 | | |
| 9 | (Denmark) Niels Kristian Iversen | 2 1 3 2 | 8 | | |
| 10 | (Denmark) Hans Andersen | 0 0 2 3 2 | 7 | | |
| 11 | (Finland) Joonas Kylmäkorpi | 0 1 3 2 0 | 6 | | |
| 12 | (England) Danny King | 1 3 2 0 0 | 6 | | |
| 13 | (Sweden) Peter Karlsson | 0 3 1 - 1 | 5 | | |
| 14 | (England) Tai Woffinden | 2 1 0 0 1 | 4 | | |
| 15 | (Australia) Cameron Woodward | 0 1 0 1 1 | 3 | | |
| 16 | (Poland) Krzysztof Kasprzak | 1 0 1 1 - | 3 | | |
| 17 | (England) Lewis Kerr (res) | 0 | 0 | | |

== Pairs ==
The Elite League Pairs Championship was held at the Foxhall Stadium on 4 September and was won by Coventry Bees.

| Pos | Team | Pts | Riders |
|---|---|---|---|
| 1 | Coventry | 26 | Kasprzak 14, Harris 12 |
| 2 | Poole | 23 | Pedersen 12, Holder 11 |
| 3 | Lakeside | 22 | Shields 12, Davidsson 10 |
| 4 | Peterborough | 20 | Bjerre 10, Iversen 10 |
| 5 | Swindon | 18 | Zengota 11, Korneliussen 7 |
| 6 | Ipswich | 17 | King 9, Nicholls 8 |
| 7 | Wolves | 15 | Klindt 12, Haines 3 |
| 8 | Eastbourne | 13 | Kling 9, Woodward 4 |
| 9 | Belle Vue | 8 | Wright J 6, Sitera 2 |

Semi finals

- Eastbourne 7 Peterborough 2 - Harris, Kasprzak, Iversen, Bjerre
- Poole 7 Lakeside 2 - Holder, Pedersen, Shields, Jacobs

Final

- Coventry 5 Poole 4 - Kasprzak, Harris, Holder, Pedersen

== Final leading averages ==
| Rider | Team | Average |
|---|---|---|
| (Sweden) Freddie Lindgren | Wolverhampton | 10.23 |
| (Australia) Leigh Adams | Swindon | 9.90 |
| (Denmark) Kenneth Bjerre | Peterborough | 9.62 |
| (England) Lee Richardson | Lakeside | 9.35 |
| (England) Scott Nicholls | Ipswich | 9.34 |
| (Poland) Krzysztof Kasprzak | Coventry | 9.02 |
| (Denmark) Bjarne Pedersen | Poole | 8.83 |
| (England) Chris Harris | Coventry | 8.80 |
| (Denmark) Hans Andersen | Belle Vue | 8.70 |
| (Australia) Chris Holder | Poole | 8.58 |

== Riders & final averages ==
Belle Vue

- (Denmark) Hans Andersen 8.70
- (Sweden) Peter Karlsson 7.44
- (Denmark) Patrick Hougaard 6.77
- (England) Leigh Lanham 6.11
- (Denmark) Ulrich Østergaard 6.08
- (England) James Wright 5.73
- (Australia) Josh Grajczonek 4.66
- (Scotland) William Lawson 4.47
- (Germany) Tobias Kroner3.87
- (England) Ricky Ashworth 3.73
- (Czech Republic) Filip Šitera 2.80

Coventry

- (Poland) Krzysztof Kasprzak 9.02
- (England) Chris Harris 8.80
- (England) Edward Kennett 7.25
- (Poland) Przemysław Pawlicki 7.08
- (Australia) Rory Schlein 7.00
- (England) Ben Barker 6.56
- (England) Lewis Bridger 6.29
- (Australia) Richard Sweetman 6.11
- (Australia) Aaron Summers 4.39
- (England) Josh Auty 3.65
- (Czech Republic) Filip Šitera 3.38

Eastbourne

- (Slovenia) Matej Žagar 8.29
- (Finland) Joonas Kylmakorpi 7.56
- (Australia) Cameron Woodward 7.26
- (Sweden) Simon Gustafsson 6.27
- (Poland) Tomasz Jędrzejak 6.04
- (Czech Republic) Lukáš Dryml 5.93
- (Sweden) Ricky Kling 5.44
- (England) Chris Schramm 4.61
- (Poland) Dawid Lampart 4.34

Ipswich

- (England) Scott Nicholls 9.34
- (England) Danny King 7.39
- (Sweden) Linus Sundstrom 6.79
- (Poland) Robert Miśkowiak 6.56
- (Czech Republic) Aleš Dryml Jr. 6.07
- (Poland) Dawid Stachyra 5.83
- (England) Oliver Allen 5.67
- (Poland) Krzysztof Słaboń 5.03
- (Denmark) Claus Vissing 3.71
- (Australia) Kozza Smith 3.69
- (England) Ritchie Hawkins 3.61
- (England) Carl Wilkinson 2.11

Lakeside

- (England) Lee Richardson 9.35
- (Poland) Krzysztof Kasprzak 8.17
- (Australia) Adam Shields 7.64
- (Sweden) Jonas Davidsson 6.87
- (Sweden) Peter Ljung 6.10
- (Finland) Kauko Nieminen 5.96
- (Sweden) Daniel Davidsson 5.49
- (England) Chris Neath 5.29
- (England) Paul Hurry 4.73
- (England) Stuart Robson 4.64

Peterborough

- (Denmark) Kenneth Bjerre 9.62
- (Denmark) Niels Kristian Iversen 7.93
- (Australia) Troy Batchelor 7.48
- (Australia) Rory Schlein 7.25
- (Poland) Krzysztof Buczkowski 6.39
- (Poland) Norbert Kosciuch 5.04
- (England) Lewis Bridger 4.90
- (Denmark) Ulrich Østergaard 4.46
- (France) Mathieu Trésarrieu 3.95
- (England) Craig Cook 2.38

Poole

- (Denmark) Bjarne Pedersen 8.83
- (Australia) Chris Holder 8.58
- (Australia) Davey Watt 8.01
- (Australia) Darcy Ward 7.93
- (Poland) Artur Mroczka 6.89
- (Denmark) Leon Madsen 6.74
- (Australia) Jason Doyle 6.25

Swindon

- (Australia) Leigh Adams 9.90
- (England) Simon Stead 8.21
- (Denmark) Mads Korneliussen 6.81
- (Poland) Maciej Janowski 6.62
- (Poland) Grzegorz Zengota 6.52
- (Sweden) Thomas H. Jonasson 5.91
- (Denmark) Morten Risager 4.39
- (Australia) Cory Gathercole 3.86
- (Australia) Justin Sedgmen 3.55

Wolverhampton

- (Sweden) Freddie Lindgren 10.23
- (England) Tai Woffinden 7.54
- (Denmark) Nicolai Klindt 6.91
- (Poland) Adam Skórnicki 6.89
- (Australia) Ty Proctor 6.72
- (England) Joe Screen 6.52
- (Australia) Matthew Wethers 5.30
- (Sweden) Ludvig Lindgren 5.26
- (England) Joe Haines 3.55

== See also ==
- Speedway in the United Kingdom
- List of United Kingdom Speedway League Champions
- Knockout Cup (speedway)
