= Brian Leonard (speedway rider) =

British speedway rider

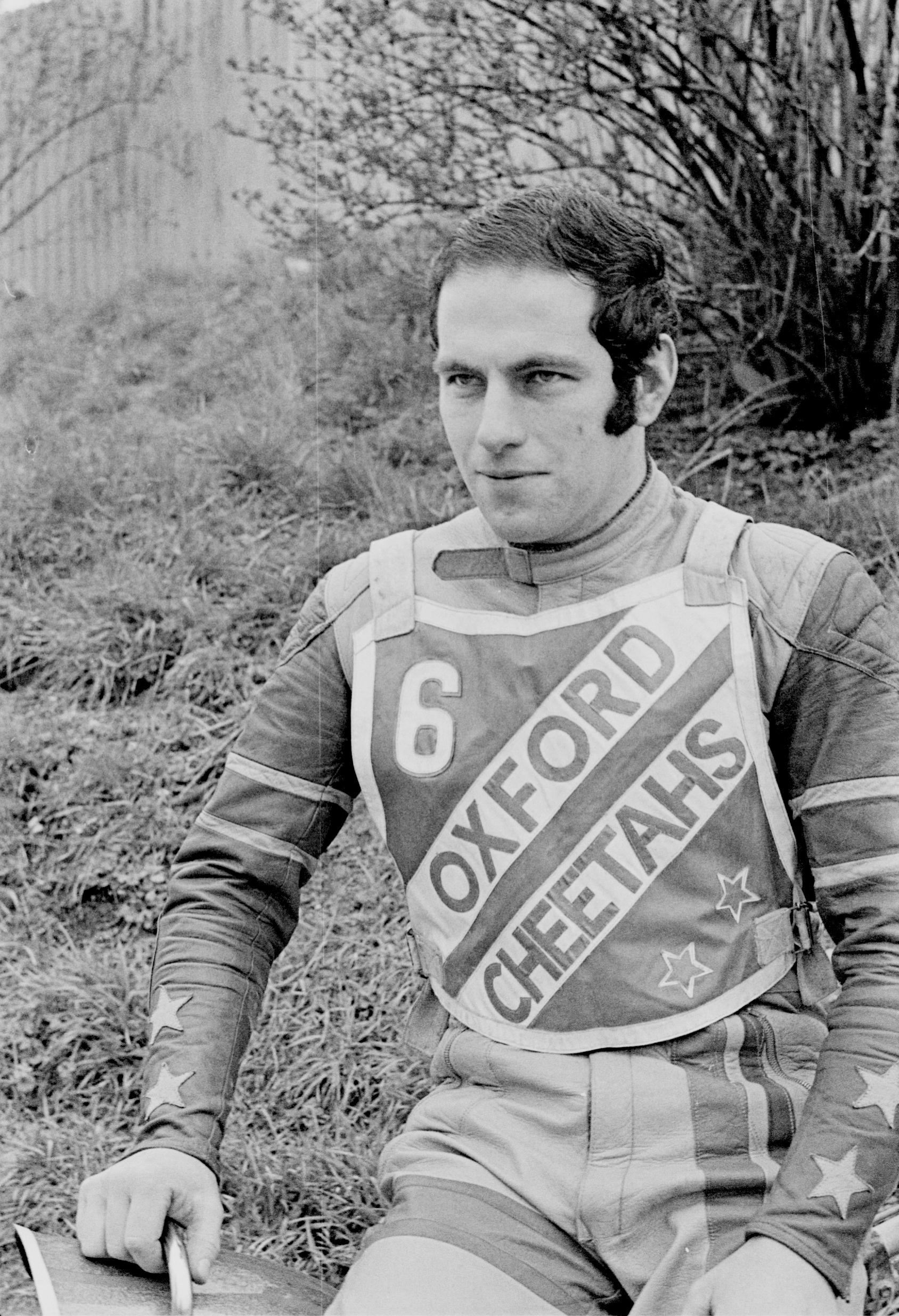
- Born: 19 February 1946 (age 80); Newbury, England
- Nationality: British (English)

Career history
- 1962-1965: Poole Pirates
- 1962, 1972-1974, 1976: Swindon Robins
- 1965-1969: West Ham Hammers
- 1969: Hackney Hawks
- 1970: Newport Wasps
- 1970-1971: Wembley Lions
- 1975, 1976: Leicester Lions
- 1976-1978: Oxford Cheetahs

Team honours
- 1965: British League Winner
- 1965: British League Knockout Cup KO Cup Winner
- 1965, 1966, 1967: London Cup Winner

Brian John Leonard (born 19 February 1946) is a former motorcycle speedway rider from England.

== Career ==
Born in Newbury, Leonard followed his father Maurice into speedway. He started his career with second half rides at Oxford in 1962, and made his league debut later that year, riding for Poole Pirates and Swindon Robins. His first two years in speedway were marred by injury, suffering two collarbone breaks, and he missed four and a half months in 1963 with two broken bones in his left leg.

In 1965, Leonard signed for West Ham Hammers, where he steadily improved, averaging over seven points per match in the 1967 season. After a spell with Hackney Hawks in 1969, he moved on to Wembley Lions in 1970 but in 1972 Wembley sent their entire team out on loan due to extra football fixtures stopping the speedway at Wembley and Leonard moved to Newport Wasps. He moved to Swindon Robins in 1972, but by 1974 his average had dropped below four points. He was signed by Leicester Lions in 1975 but released after a poor run of results, due in part to a back injury, which led to his retirement from the sport. He returned in 1976 and fared better after dropping down to the National League with Oxford Cheetahs, averaging over seven points. The following year, he scored less well, and after two matches in 1978 he retired.
