= Lars Munkedal =

Danish speedway rider

- Born: 3 March 1967 (age 59); Copenhagen, Denmark
- Nationality: Danish

Career history

Denmark
- 1986: Fjelsted
- 1987–1991: Slangerup

Great Britain
- 1987–1988, 1990–1991: Wolverhampton Wolves
- 1988: Oxford Cheetahs
- 1989: Edinburgh Monarchs
- 1991: Middlesbrough Bears

Sweden
- 1986: Dackarna

Individual honours
- 1985: Danish U21 bronze

Team honours
- 1986: Allsvenskan Winner

Lars Munkedal (born 3 March 1967) is a former motorcycle speedway rider from Denmark. He earned four caps for the Denmark national speedway team.

== Career ==
Munkedal came to prominence when he won the bronze medal in the 1985 Danish U21 Championship, during the 1985 Danish speedway season.

Munkedal made his British leagues debut during the 1987 British League season, when he rode for Wolverhampton Wolves. In 1988, he rode for Wolverhampton and Oxford Cheetahs. He went on to ride for Edinburgh and Middlesbrough as well.
