= Ivor Hughes (speedway rider) =

Welsh speedway rider

- Born: 28 February 1939; Welshpool, Powys, Wales
- Died: 23 August 1966 (aged 27)
- Nationality: British (Welsh)

Career history
- 1964: Wolverhampton Wolves
- 1964–1966: Cradley Heathens
- 1965: Exeter Falcons
- 1965: Long Eaton Archers

Ivor John Hughes (28 February 1939 – 23 August 1966) was a motorcycle speedway rider from Wales, who rode for the Cradley Heath Heathens team during the 1960s.

== Career ==
Born in Middletown, near Welshpool Hughes started motorcycling with the local Clive Motorcycle Club, being a founder member, before turning to speedway with the purchase of a JAP machine at the end 1963 and after-the-meeting rides at Stoke.

During June 1964, Hughes made his first team appearance riding for Wolverhampton Wolves and then joined Cradley. By the end of 1965 he achieved an average of 2.89 for Cradley and 6.00 for Exeter Falcons. His breakthrough year was 1966 and on 21 May, he top scored for Cradley and challenged the three time World champion (soon to be 4) Barry Briggs for the Silver Sash. On 10 August in a match against Swedish team Vagarna he beat the current world champion at the time Björn Knutson in a scratch race.

Hughes would never fulfil his potential because ten days later going into the final heat of the match against Sheffield Tigers he was involved in a crash with Bob Paulson and Jack Kitchen at the Dudley Wood Stadium on Saturday 20 August 1966 in the final heat of the British League match against Sheffield Tigers. He suffered a serious head injury and died three days later in hospital.

After his death, Cradley started a fund for his family and an Ivor Hughes Memorial Trophy was presented annually in his honour by the Cradley club, either raced for or awarded.

Hughes' off-track occupation was a plumber in his home town of Berriew, Powys, Wales.

== See also ==
Rider deaths in motorcycle speedway
