= Kim Jansson =

Swedish speedway rider

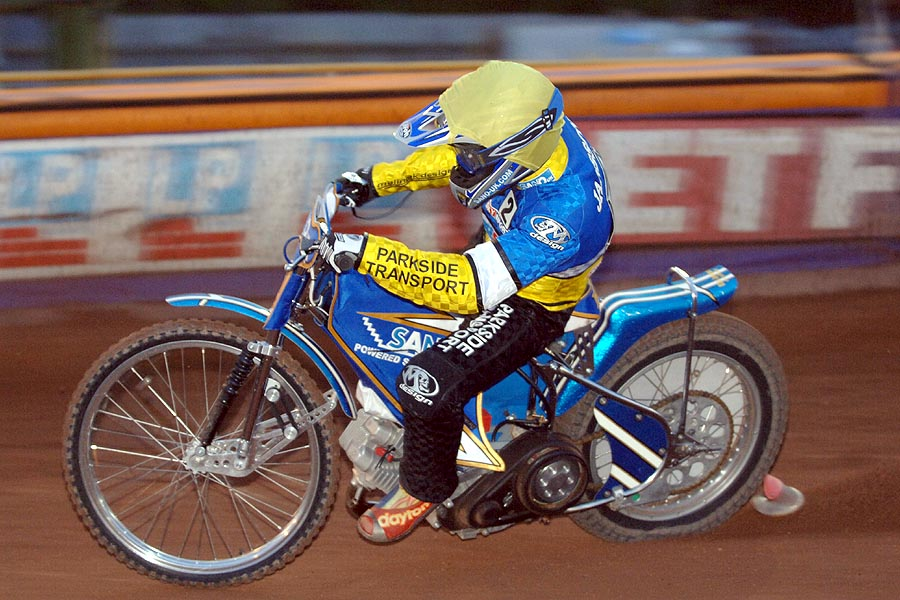
- Jansson in action
- Born: 30 October 1981 (age 45); Gothenburg, Sweden
- Nationality: Swedish

Career history

Sweden
- 2001-2003: Kaparna
- 2002-2003: Gastarna
- 2008: Team Bikab

Great Britain
- 2002-2007: Ipswich Witches

Poland
- 2006-2007: Gorzów
- 2008: Gniezno

Team honours
- 2003: Swedish Elitserien Champion

Kim Patrik Jansson (born 30 October 1981) is a former motorcycle speedway rider from Sweden.

== Speedway career ==
Jansson rode in the top tier of British Speedway riding for the Ipswich Witches from 2002 to 2007, in the Elite League.

On 16 August 2008, Jansson crashed during a race in Sweden, while riding for Team Bikab against Filbyterna that left him paralysed.
