= Jim Lightfoot (speedway rider) =

English speedway rider (1933–2023)

- Born: 11 November 1933; Coventry, England
- Died: 4 March 2023 (aged 89)
- Nationality: British (English)

Career history
- 1953–1966: Coventry Bees
- 1967: Long Eaton Archers

Individual honours
- 1963: Speedway World Championship finalist

Team honours
- 1954: Northern Shield
- 1960, 1966: Midland Cup
- 1961: Central Shield

James Arthur Lightfoot (11 November 1933 – 4 March 2023) was an international Motorcycle speedway rider from England. He earned one international cap for the England national speedway team and three caps for the Great Britain team.

== Speedway career ==
Lightfoot reached the final of the Speedway World Championship in the 1963 Individual Speedway World Championship.

Lightfoot rode in the top tier of British Speedway from 1953 to 1966, riding for Coventry Bees. Jim was born within 4 miles of Coventry's Brandon Stadium and captained his team for a number of years.

Lightfoot helped Coventry win the Midland Cup on two occasions in 1960 and 1966.

In the latter part of 1966 following a long career for Coventry, Lightfoot decided for a change and wanted a transfer to Cradley Heathens, which was refused by the Control Board. He subsequently signed for the Long Eaton Archers to compete in the 1967 British League season but after a single season at the club retired from speedway.

Lightfoot died on 4 March 2023.

== World final appearances ==
=== Individual World Championship ===
- 1963 – (England) London, Wembley Stadium – 14th – 4pts
- 1964 – (Sweden) Gothenburg, Ullevi – Reserve – Did not ride
