= Tony Clarke (speedway rider) =

English motorcycle speedway rider

- Born: 6 July 1940; Kensal Green, London
- Died: 2 May 2014 (aged 73); South London
- Nationality: British (English)

Career history
- 1965, 1967-1970: West Ham Hammers
- 1966: Oxford Cheetahs
- 1971: Wembley Lions
- 1972: Newport Wasps
- 1973: Wimbledon Dons
- 1973-1975: Wolverhampton Wolves

Team honours
- 1965: British League
- 1965: Knockout Cup
- 1965, 1967: London Cup
- 1973: Midland Cup

Anthony Brian Clarke (6 July 1940 – 2 May 2014) was an international motorcycle speedway rider from England. He earned eleven international caps for the England national speedway team and two caps for Great Britain.

== Biography ==
Clarke was born in 1940 in Kensal Green, London during World War II. In early 1965, the West Ham Hammers promoter Tommy Price spotted Clarke training at Rye House and duly signed him. He began racing during the 1965 British League season for the Hammers and had a good first season averaging 4.48 but more importantly was part of the team that won the treble. He was transferred to Oxford Cheetahs for the 1966 season before returning to West Ham in 1967.

In 1967, Clarke helped West Ham secure a third consecutive London Cup and by 1969 had earned a British Lions tour of Australia and New Zealand, built his average up to 8.49 and been made team captain of West Ham.

Clarke's West Ham career came to an end after the 1970 season and he joined London rivals Wembley Lions in 1971. In 1972 Wembley sent their entire team out on loan due to extra football fixtures stopping the speedway at Wembley and Clarke moved to Newport Wasps.

Clarke's career took a sinister turn. During the 1972 Individual Speedway World Championship, the Russian riders had three of their bikes stolen and had to borrow equipment to compete. Clarke and his brother Terrence were involved in the theft acting as a fence and both received prison sentences.

Clarke joined Wimbledon Dons for the remainder of the 1973 season and finally Wolverhampton from 1973 to 1975. He won the Midland Cup with Wolves in 1973.
