= Wayne Garratt =

- Born: 30 October 1968; Halesowen, England
- Died: 28 September 1992 (aged 23)
- Nationality: British (English)

Career history
- Cradley Heathens: 1986–1991
- Arena Essex Hammers: 1989–1990
- Newcastle Diamonds: 1992

Wayne Malcolm Garratt (30 October 1968 in Halesowen, England – 28 September 1992) was a speedway rider from the United Kingdom.

== Career summary ==
Garratt was also a junior grasstrack champion at the age of six. He started his speedway career with the Cradley Heathens in the British League on his 16th birthday and earned the nickname 'Bodger'.

Garratt showed a lot of promise, but due to the points limit restrictions he was loaned to the Arena Essex Hammers in the National League for two seasons. He was recalled to Cradley again in 1991 but was forced out again by the points limit for 1992. He received a ban from July 1991 until the end of the season following a track altercation with Neil Collins.

However, in 1992, whilst on loan with the Newcastle Diamonds, Garratt was involved in a crash at Brough Park on Sunday 13 September and was rushed to hospital and placed on a life support machine. Garratt died after 15 days and never having regained consciousness. His body was transported back to the West Midlands.

== See also ==
Rider deaths in motorcycle speedway
