= Coventry Bees =

English motorcycle speedway team

Club information
- Track address: Brandon Stadium
- Country: England
- Founded: 1928
- Closed: 2018
- Website: www.savecoventryspeedway.com

Club facts
- Colours: Yellow and Black
- Track size: 301 metres (329 yd)
- Track record time: 57.6 seconds
- Track record holder: Chris Harris

Major team honours
| League Champions | 1968, 1978, 1979, 1987, 1988, 2005, 2007, 2010 |
| Knockout Cup Winners | 1967, 2006, 2007 |
| League Cup Winners | 1981, 1985, 1987 |
| Craven Shield | 1997, 2000, 2007, 2008 |
| British Pairs champions | 1978, 2008, 2010 |
| National League Div 2 | 1953 |
| Midland Cup Winners | 1952, 1960, 1966, 1969, 1970, 1971, 1976, 1977, 1978, 1979, 1981, 1982 |
| Midland League Winners | 1980 |
| Midland Dev League | 2016 |

Coventry Bees were a motorcycle speedway team that existed from 1929 to 2018. They raced at Brandon Stadium, Brandon near Coventry, England. They are eight times champions of Britain.

== History ==
=== Origins and 1920s ===
The first speedway in Coventry arrived during the inaugural year of UK speedway on 21 July 1928, at the Lythalls Lane Stadium. The racing was organised by Midlands Speedways (a Manchester company) with a series of open and challenge events. In September 1928, rival venue Brandon Stadium began to host events. The first match to feature a Coventry team was an away fixture to Liverpool on 24 October 1928.

The first league speedway saw Coventry (based at Brandon Stadium) compete in the 1929 Speedway Southern League, which was the inaugural season of the Southern League. The team featuring some of the most famous names the era, including Jack Parker and Tom Farndon finished third behind Stamford Bridge Pensioners.

=== 1930s ===
After the 1930 season, the team disbanded following financial difficulties experienced by the owners Motordromes Ltd. They did however return mid-way through the 1931 season to replace Leicester Stadium, who were liquidated in late May.

Coventry were founder members of the National League from 1932 to 1933. The team were all set to return to action in 1934, but the Brandon proprietor C. W. East suddenly put the stadium up for sale. Despite challenges matches taking place during 1934 and 1936, league speedway would not return to Coventry for 15 years.

=== 1940s ===
Coventry was devastated during the war and it was not until 1948 that speedway returned under Coventry Stadium Ltd. Jack Parker became the technical adviser and a team entered the 1948 Speedway National League Division Three. The club also became known as The Bees and Charles Ochiltree became the team manager. In 1949 the Bees competed in the second division.

=== 1950s ===
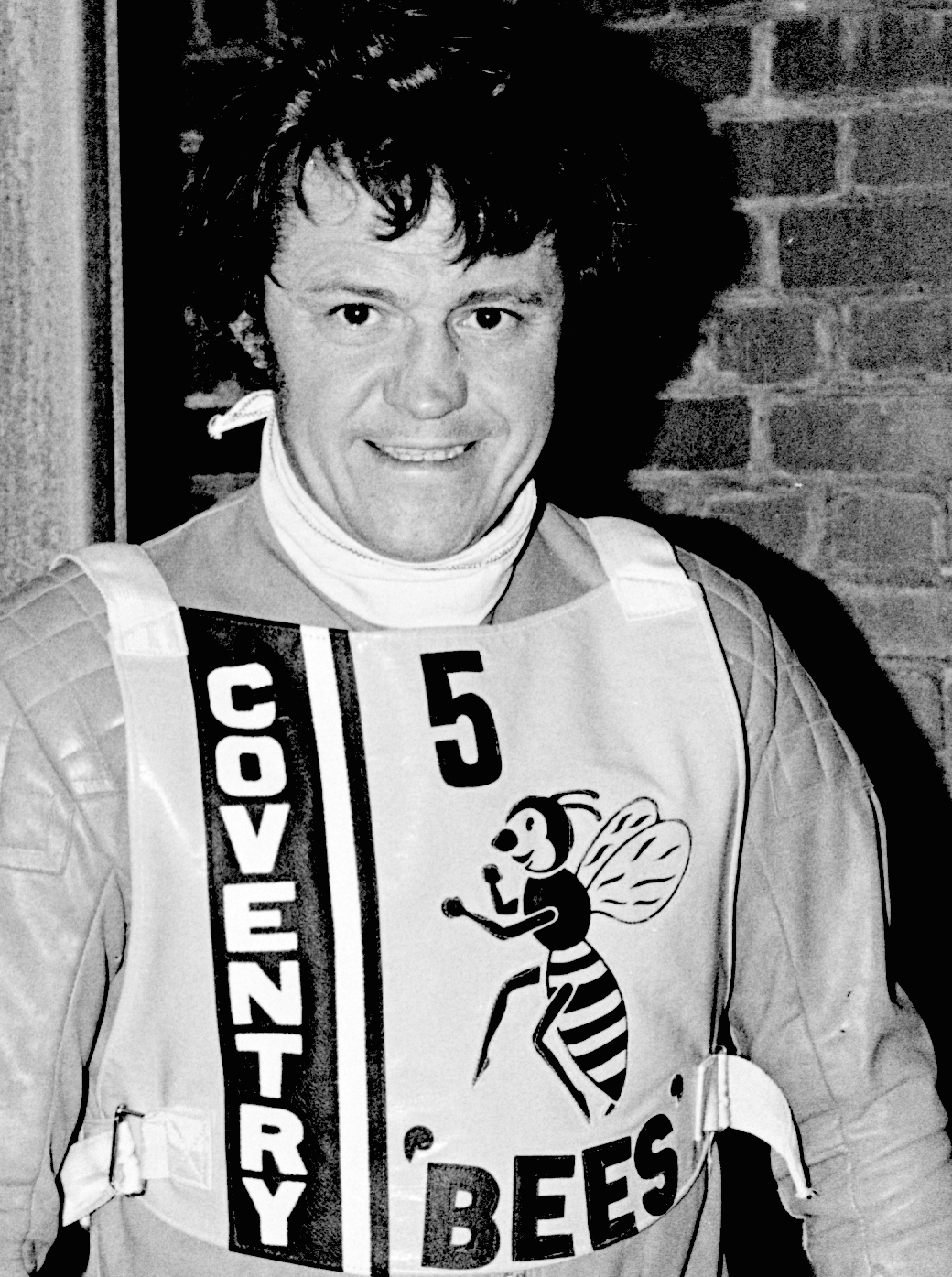
Nigel Boocock signed from Ipswich in 1959

After two solid seasons in 1950 and 1951, the team won their first of eleven Midland Cups in 1952. The Bees then won the 1953 Speedway National League Division Two league title, with the team including riders Charlie New and Stan Williams. The Bees continued to compete in the second division, finishing runner-up in 1955 before they took their place in Division 1 in 1957. Per Olof Söderman, Ron Mountford and Jim Lightfoot emerged as leading riders for the club, and Nigel Boocock was signed from Ipswich.

=== 1960s ===
After a second Midland Cup win in 1960, the Bees experienced limited success, even after joining the new revamped British League in 1965. However, finally in 1967 the team won the British League Knockout Cup 1967 and finished runners-up to Swindon Robins in the league. The following season for the 1968 British League, the Bees signed Czech rider Antonín Kasper Sr. to support Nigel Boocock and Ron Mountford and the consistency of other riders such as Col Cottrell, Les Owen and Rick France resulted in the Bees becoming UK champions for first time.

=== 1970s ===
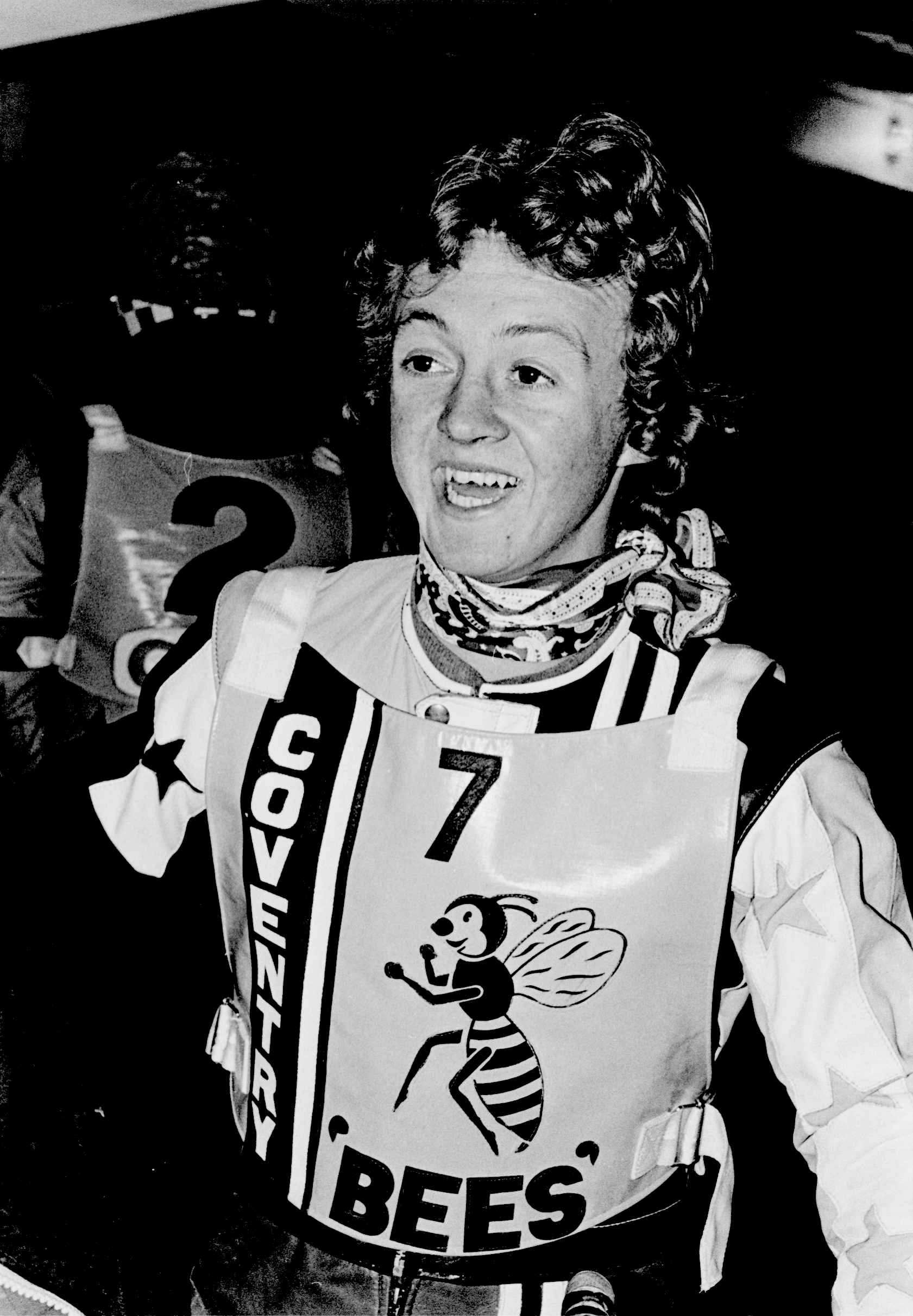
Mitch Shirra

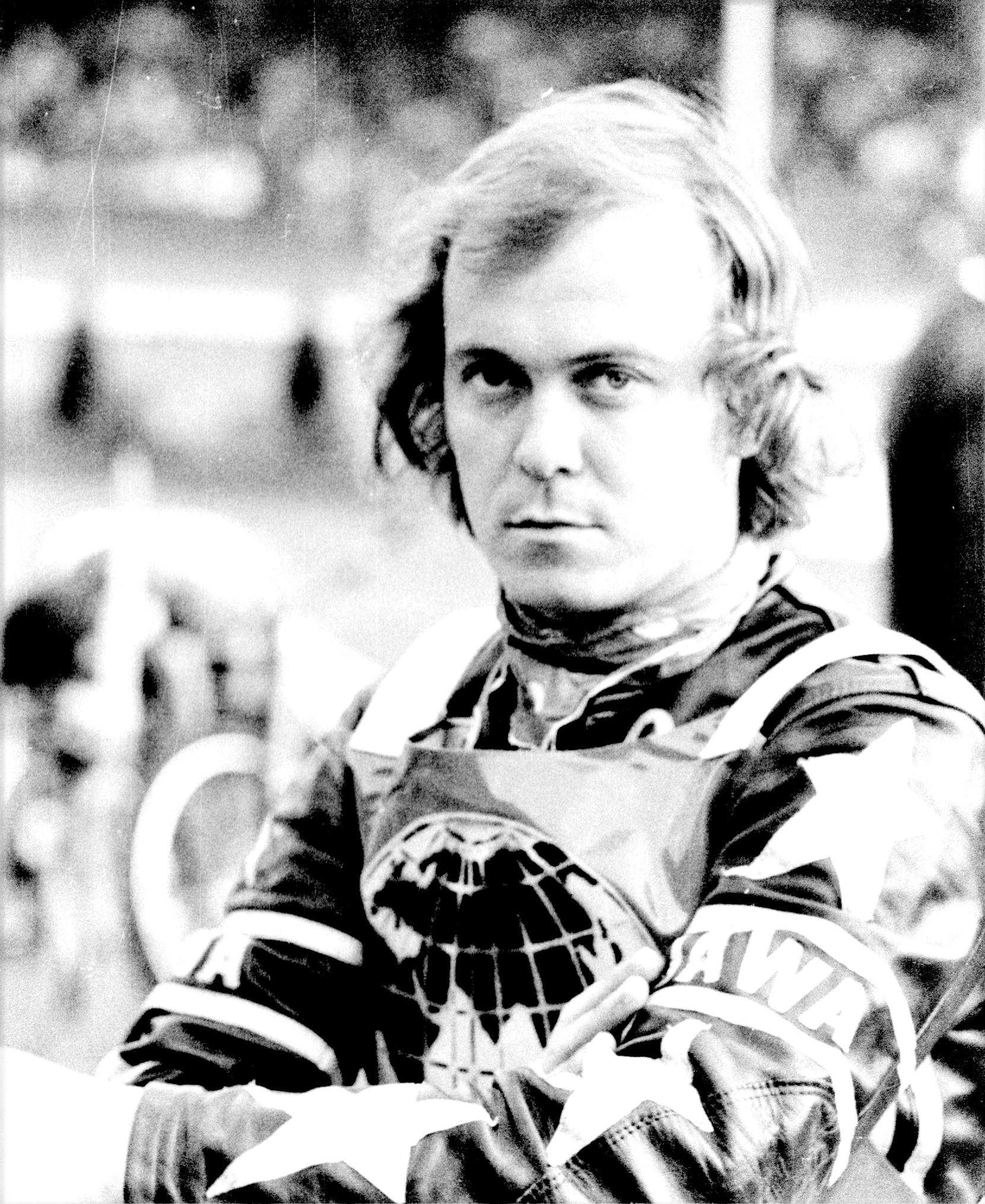
Ole Olsen

Despite winning a third consecutive Midland Cup in 1971 the Bees experienced several poor seasons. In an attempt to bring back success they signed the world champion Ole Olsen in 1976 and the Bees results began to improve. The team won back to back league titles in 1978 and 1979. Olsen was imperious, with Mitch Shirra and Alan Molyneux adding vital support, as did two Danes Alf Busk and 17 year-old Tommy Knudsen.

=== 1980s ===
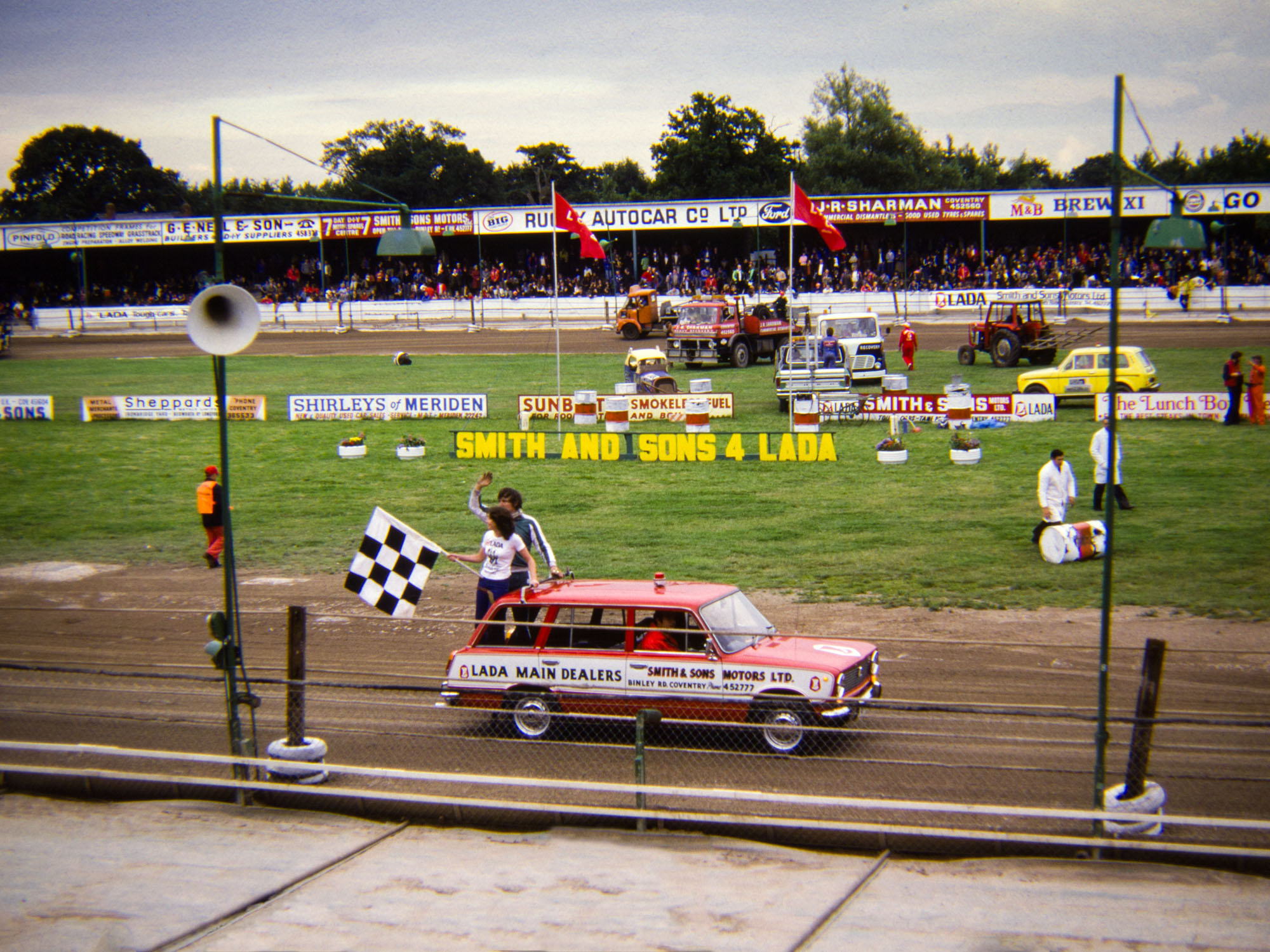
Brandon Stadium in 1980

The 1980s saw smaller successes, with League Cup wins in 1981 and 1985 and Midland Cup wins in 1981 and 1982 but the Bees fell short when it came to challenging for the league title.

Tommy Knudsen became the number 1 rider and the club signed Kelvin Tatum, Rick Miller and John Jørgensen in an attempt to compete with Oxford Cheetahs and Cradley Heath Heathens. The consistency of the four riders helped the Bees claim back to back league titles (1987 & 1988) for a second time in the club's history.

Charles Ochiltree continued to promote the speedway as he had done way back in the 1950s under Allan Sanderson's company Midland Sports Stadiums. Ochiltree was now managing director of the company.

=== 1990s ===
The club's fortunes somewhat declined during the 1990s, with the Bees achieving a best place finish of 3rd during the 1998 Elite League speedway season. They did however claim a Craven Shield win in 1997. Many riders came in and out of the team with the pick of them being Hans Nielsen, Brian Andersen, Greg Hancock and Billy Hamill.

=== 2000s ===
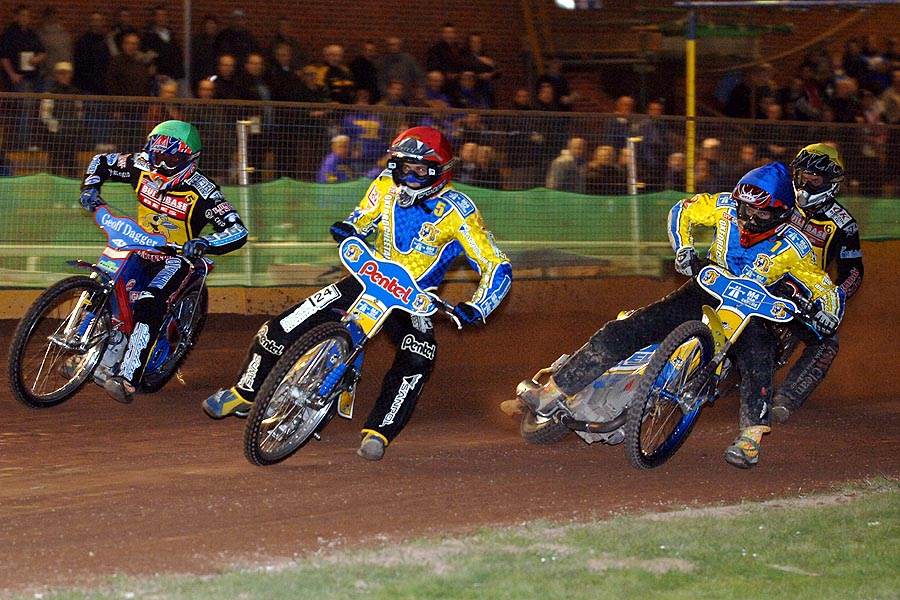
Coventry versus Oxford in 2007

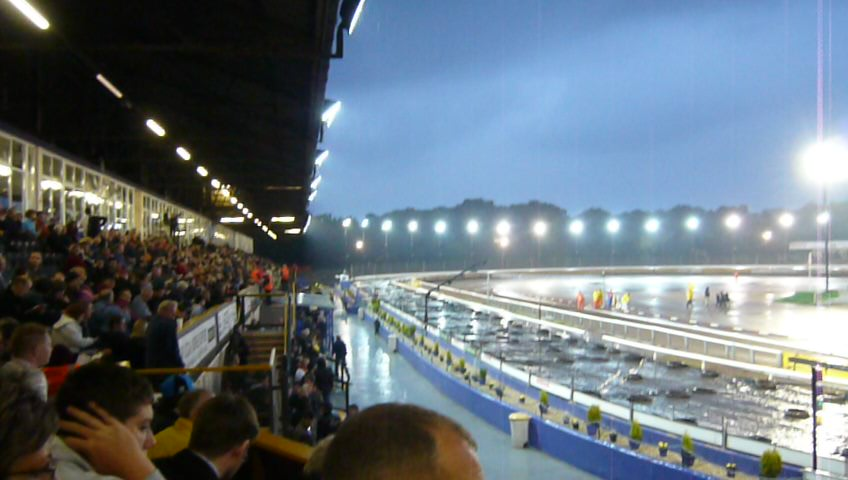
Brandon Stadium, 2009

The American pairing of Hancock and Hamill led Coventry into the new millennium and the Bees results were solid, twice finishing 3rd in 2001 and 2002 before finishing runner-up behind Poole Pirates in 2003. After a terrible 2004 campaign changes were made with Scott Nicholls coming in to support number 1 Andreas Jonsson. The pair were well supported by other new signings Joonas Kylmäkorpi and Sebastian Ułamek, which resulted in the Bees becoming the 2005 champions.

On 28 October 2007, the Bees lifted the Elite League Knockout Cup for the second year running, defeating the Swindon Robins in the final, completing a clean sweep of all three major trophies, having already annexed the Craven Shield by beating Swindon Robins and the Poole Pirates over the three leg final and winning the league title. Scott Nicholls remained with the team from 2005 and was well supported by Chris Harris.

=== 2010s ===
In 2010, the Bees won the Elite League Championship, defeating the Poole Pirates in both legs of the play-off grand finals. The 2010 triumph was the eighth and last time that Coventry would be crowned champions of Britain.

The 2011 season brought continual problems starting on 24 November 2010, when changes to the rules for rider averages made at the AGM of the BSPA saw the Bees and Peterborough Panthers walk out of the meeting, resulting in the BSPA omitting both teams from the 2011 season for failing to declare their intent to compete. However, four months later on 8 April 2011, the BSPA reversed the decision. Later, captain Edward Kennett was banned for six months, after it was deemed his silencer was ‘illegal’, with Kennett blaming a fellow team member. Then on 21 September, the Bees were put up for sale by owner Avtar Sandhu. Businessman Mick Horton and Colin Pratt took over the team.

Five more seasons of Elite League racing ensued, including a play-off final in 2014 before the racing ceased due to the closure of Brandon Stadium.

== Closure ==
On 26 February 2017 it was announced by the BSPA that the club had had its licence frozen because they were unable to satisfy the BSPA that they could fulfil a full season of league racing. This was primarily due to having an agreement with Leicester Lions to only use their stadium for a handful of fixtures and not having any guarantees of being able to return to Brandon Stadium for the remaining fixtures.

The Bees were reformed to compete in the junior 2018 National League speedway season, with home meetings being staged at Leicester, but once again became homeless in 2019 as the Leicester promotion decided to run their own National League junior team. Brandon Stadium today lies derelict with several planning applications having been made for redevelopment. Many club enthusiasts, supported by the local council, have campaigned for the return of speedway and stock car racing to the stadium.

In early 2022, an organisation advocating the return of motorsport to the site, Save Coventry Speedway, proposed to the council that speedway be restored to the stadium, along with a museum and restaurant. In January 2024, Brandon Estates appeal for planning application to redevelop the site was dismissed by the Inspector.

== Notable riders ==
- (Denmark) Brian Andersen
- (Denmark) Hans Andersen
- (England) Nigel Boocock
- (Denmark) Alf Busk
- (Australia) Dicky Case
- (England) Col Cottrell
- (England) Simon Cross
- (England) Tom Farndon
- (England) Rick France
- (Australia) Gary Guglielmi
- (United States) Billy Hamill
- (United States) Greg Hancock
- (England) Chris Harris
- (Sweden) Andreas Jonsson
- (Denmark) John Jørgensen
- (Czech Republic) Antonín Kasper Sr.
- (Poland) Krzysztof Kasprzak
- (Denmark) Tommy Knudsen
- (England) Jim Lightfoot
- (Scotland) Ken McKinlay
- (Australia) Garry Middleton
- (United States) Rick Miller
- (England) Alan Molyneux
- (England) Ron Mountford
- (England) Nick Nicholls
- (England) Scott Nicholls
- (Denmark) Hans Nielsen
- (Sweden) Olle Nygren
- (Denmark) Ole Olsen
- (England) Les Owen
- (England) Jack Parker
- (England) Lee Richardson
- (Australia) Rory Schlein
- (New Zealand) Mitch Shirra
- (England) Andy Smith
- (Sweden) Per Olof Söderman
- (Czechoslovakia) Jiří Štancl
- (England) Kelvin Tatum
- (Australia) Jack Young

== Season summary ==
Extended content

| Year and league | Position | Notes |
|---|---|---|
| 1929 Speedway Southern League | 3rd | |
| 1930 Speedway Southern League | 6th | |
| 1931 Speedway Southern League | 10th | |
| 1932 Speedway National League | 7th | |
| 1933 Speedway National League | 7th | |
| 1948 Speedway National League Division Three | 8th | |
| 1949 Speedway National League Division Two | 12th | |
| 1950 Speedway National League Division Two | 4th | |
| 1951 Speedway National League Division Two | 4th | |
| 1952 Speedway National League Division Two | 2nd | Midland Cup |
| 1953 Speedway National League Division Two | 1st | Div 2 champions |
| 1954 Speedway National League | 8th | |
| 1955 Speedway National League | 2nd | |
| 1956 Speedway National League | 5th | |
| 1957 Speedway National League | 8th | |
| 1958 Speedway National League | 7th | |
| 1959 Speedway National League | 3rd | |
| 1960 Speedway National League | 9th | Midland Cup |
| 1961 Speedway National League | 3rd | |
| 1962 Speedway National League | 3rd | |
| 1963 Speedway National League | 4th | |
| 1964 Speedway National League | 2nd | |
| 1965 British League season | 3rd | |
| 1966 British League season | 2nd | Midland Cup |
| 1967 British League season | 2nd | Knockout Cup winners |
| 1968 British League season | 1st | champions |
| 1969 British League season | 14th | Midland Cup |
| 1970 British League season | 3rd | Midland Cup |
| 1971 British League season | 3rd | Midland Cup |
| 1972 British League season | 10th | |
| 1973 British League season | 15th | |
| 1974 British League season | 15th | |
| 1975 British League season | 16th | |
| 1976 British League season | 4th | Midland Cup |
| 1977 British League season | 8th | Midland Cup |
| 1978 British League season | 1st | champions, Midland Cup |
| 1979 British League season | 1st | champions, Midland Cup |
| 1980 British League season | 4th | |
| 1981 British League season | 5th | League cup winners, Midland Cup |
| 1982 British League season | 4th | Midland Cup |
| 1983 British League season | 3rd | |
| 1984 British League season | 12th | |
| 1985 British League season | 3rd | League Cup winners |
| 1986 British League season | 5th | |
| 1987 British League season | 1st | champions, League Cup winners |
| 1988 British League season | 1st | champions |
| 1989 British League season | 5th | |
| 1990 British League season | 8th | |
| 1991 British League season | 7th | |
| 1992 British League season | 8th | |
| 1993 British League season | 5th | |
| 1994 British League season | 4th | |
| 1995 Premier League speedway season | 15th | |
| 1996 Premier League speedway season | 10th | |
| 1997 Elite League speedway season | 8th | Craven Shield winners |
| 1998 Elite League speedway season | 3rd | |
| 1999 Elite League speedway season | 4th | |
| 2000 Elite League speedway season | 4th | Craven Shield winners |
| 2001 Elite League speedway season | 3rd | |
| 2002 Elite League speedway season | 3rd | |
| 2003 Elite League speedway season | 2nd | |
| 2004 Elite League speedway season | 10th | |
| 2005 Elite League speedway season | 2nd | PO Champions |
| 2006 Elite League speedway season | 4th | Knockout Cup winners |
| 2007 Elite League speedway season | 1st | champions, Knockout Cup & Craven Shield winners |
| 2008 Elite League speedway season | 6th | Craven Shield winners |
| 2009 Elite League speedway season | 4th | |
| 2010 Elite League speedway season | 4th | PO Champions |
| 2011 Elite League speedway season | 5th | |
| 2012 Elite League speedway season | 8th | |
| 2013 Elite League speedway season | 10th | |
| 2014 Elite League speedway season | 3rd | PO Final |
| 2015 Elite League speedway season | 2nd | PO Semi |
| 2016 Elite League | 7th | |

== Season summary (juniors) ==
Extended content

Coventry Storm made their competitive debut in the 2013 National League season. The Bees had previously run a team in the third tier of British speedway in 2004, under the name Coventry Cougars. The initial team line-up was Joe Jacobs, James Sarjeant, Oliver Greenwood, Brendan Johnson, Richard Franklin, Trevor Heath, and Martin Knuckey, but a broken wrist for Greenwood saw Robert Branford replace him, with Tommy Fenwick also replacing Heath.

| Year and league | Position | Notes |
|---|---|---|
| 2004 Speedway Conference League | N/A | Cougars, Conference Trophy only |
| 2013 National League speedway season | 5th | Storm |
| 2014 National League speedway season | 2nd | Storm |
| 2015 National League speedway season | 4th | Storm |
| 2016 National League speedway season | 10th | Storm |
| 2018 National League speedway season | 5th | Bees |

== See also ==
- Category:Coventry Bees riders
