= British League =

British motorcycle speedway league

- Formerly: replaced the National League and Provincial League
- Sport: Speedway
- Founded: 1965
- Folded: 1994 replaced by Elite League
- Competitors: Varied
- Country: United Kingdom

The British League was the main motorcycle speedway league in Britain from its formation in 1965 until 1995 when British speedway was restructured. It initially had a single division, with a second division starting in 1968 (which was renamed the New National League in 1975 and subsequently the National League).

The British League was formed in 1965 following the merger of the National League and the Provincial League. Matches were held over a series of races, with two riders from each team taking part in each race. In 1995 it was replaced by the Premier League for two years before the sport was restructured into three tiers with the formation of the Elite League in 1997. The Championship was decided on a league table basis.

== Champions ==
Season	Champions	Second	Third
1965	West Ham Hammers	Wimbledon Dons	Coventry Bees
1966	Halifax Dukes	Coventry Bees	Swindon Robins
1967	Swindon Robins	Coventry Bees	West Ham Hammers
1968	Coventry Bees	Hackney Hawks	Exeter Falcons
1969	Poole Pirates	Belle Vue Aces	Wimbledon Dons
1970	Belle Vue Aces	Wimbledon Dons	Coventry Bees
1971	Belle Vue Aces	Leicester Lions	Coventry Bees
1972	Belle Vue Aces	Reading Racers	King's Lynn Stars
1973	Reading Racers	Sheffield Tigers	King's Lynn Stars
1974	Exeter Falcons	Belle Vue Aces	Ipswich Witches
1975	Ipswich Witches	Belle Vue Aces	Newport
1976	Ipswich Witches	Belle Vue Aces	Exeter Falcons
1977	White City Rebels	Exeter Falcons	Reading Racers
1978	Coventry Bees	Belle Vue Aces	Hull Vikings
1979	Coventry Bees	Hull Vikings	Cradley Heath Heathens
1980	Reading Racers	Hackney Hawks	Belle Vue Aces
1981	Cradley Heathens	Ipswich Witches	Swindon Robins
1982	Belle Vue Aces	Cradley Heathens	Ipswich Witches
1983	Cradley Heath Heathens	Ipswich Witches	Coventry Bees
1984	Ipswich Witches	Belle Vue Aces	Cradley Heath Heathens
1985	Oxford Cheetahs	Sheffield Tigers	Coventry Bees
1986	Oxford Cheetahs	Cradley Heathens	Wolverhampton Wolves
1987	Coventry Bees	Cradley Heathens	Swindon Robins
1988	Coventry Bees	Belle Vue Aces	Cradley Heath Heathens
1989	Oxford Cheetahs	Wolverhampton Wolves	Cradley Heath Heathens
1990	Reading Racers	Wolverhampton Wolves	Belle Vue Aces
1991	Wolverhampton Wolves	Bradford Dukes	Cradley Heath Heathens
1992	Reading Racers	Bradford Dukes	Poole Pirates
1993	Belle Vue Aces	Wolverhampton Wolves	Eastbourne Eagles
1994	Poole Pirates	Eastbourne Eagles	Wolverhampton Wolves

== See also ==
- List of United Kingdom Speedway League Champions
- List of United Kingdom Speedway League Riders' champions
- British League Riders' Championship
