= Midland Cup (speedway) =

British motorcycle speedway competition

- Sport: Speedway
- Founded: 1951
- Folded: 1987
- Country: United Kingdom

The Midland Cup was a motorcycle speedway competition held in the United Kingdom from 1951 to 1987, that was restricted to teams from the Midlands area.

The competition was a significant competition at the time, due to the speedway teams from the Midlands being some of the leading teams in the United Kingdom (particularly in the 1980s).

== Midland Cup ==
Season	Champions	Runner-Up	Ref
1951	Leicester	Birmingham	
1952	Coventry	Birmingham	
1953	Birmingham	Coventry	
1954	Birmingham	Coventry	
1955	Birmingham	Leicester	
1960	Coventry	Leicester	
1966	Coventry	Wolverhampton	
1967	Swindon	Coventry	
1968	Swindon	Leicester	
1969	Coventry	Leicester	
1970	Coventry	Leicester	
1971	Coventry	Leicester	
1972	Leicester	Wolverhampton	
1973	Wolverhampton	Leicester	
1974	Leicester	Wolverhampton	
1975	Oxford	Wolverhampton	
1976	Coventry	Wolverhampton	
1977	Coventry	Cradley Heath	
1978	Coventry	Leicester	
1979	Coventry	Leicester	
1980	Cradley Heath	Coventry	
1981	Coventry	Cradley Heath	
1982	Coventry	Cradley Heath	
1983	Cradley Heath	Coventry	
1984	Cradley Heath	Swindon	
1985	Oxford	Cradley Heath	
1986	Oxford	Coventry	
1987	Cradley Heath	Wolverhampton	

Discontinued
