= Dirt track racing in Australia =

Auto racing performed on clay or dirt surfaced oval tracks in Australia

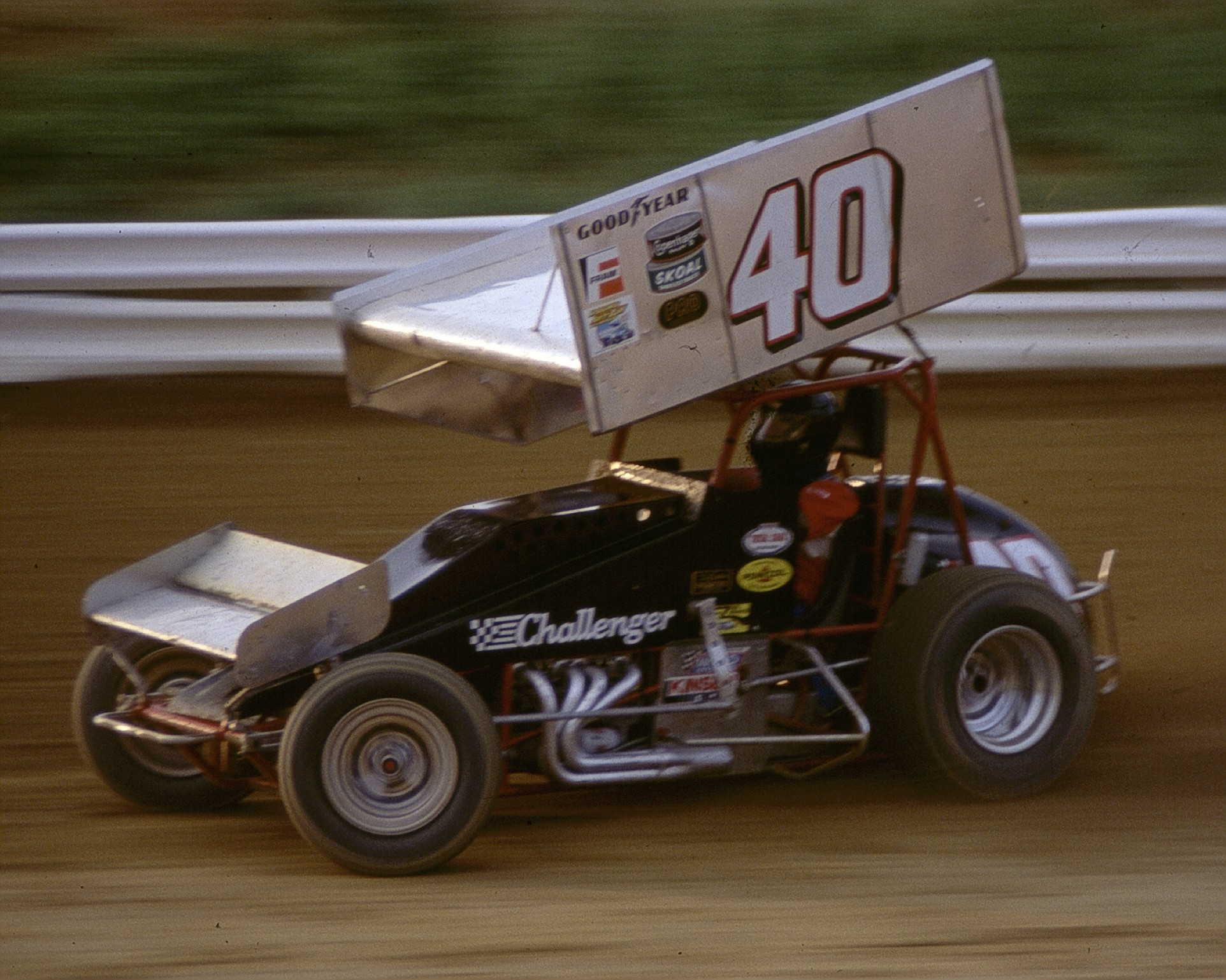
Winged sprint car

Dirt track racing is a type of auto racing performed on clay or dirt surfaced oval tracks in Australia. The seasons tend to be from September to April. There are a large number of tracks available Australia wide, with some of the most popular ones being Perth Motorplex, Bunbury Speedway, Speedway City, Premier Speedway Warrnambool (Sungold Stadium) and Sydney Speedway (trading as Valvoline Raceway). The richest and best known Speedway series in Australia is the World Series Sprintcars. The series was conceived by Adelaide based sedan driver and promoter John Hughes in 1986 as an Australian version of the famous World of Outlaws (WoO) series run in the United States since 1978. The most recent season was the 2014–15 World Series Sprintcars season.

There is also a single meeting Australian Sprintcar Championship which is run over 12 rounds during the Australian Speedway season (as of 2013–14). The Australian Sprintcar Championship has been contested every year since 1963. Only open to Australian Sprint Car drivers, the Championship is for winged 410ci cars. It is contested at a different track each season, on a state-by-state rotational basis. The 2015 Championship was held at Western Australia's Bunbury Speedway. The 2016 title will be held at Victoria's Premier Speedway. The most successful driver of the Championship's history is Garry Rush with 10 wins. Another popular annual event is the Australian Super Sedan Championship.

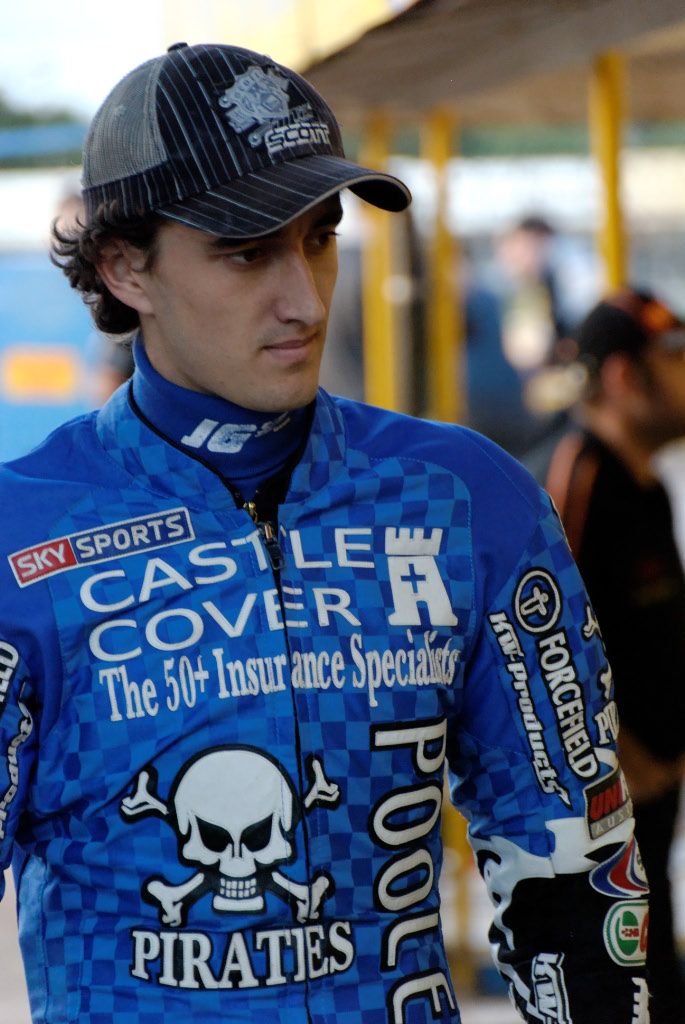
Chris Holder - Australian speedway rider and captain of the Australian team

The composition of the dirt on tracks has an effect on the amount of grip available. Tracks can be composed of any of the following materials; clay, dirt, sand, Dolomite, crushed granite and crusher dust. Some tracks are also banked or semi-banked, although most are flat. The Ultimate Sprintcar Championship (USC) recently announced a new television show which will be broadcast on 7mate, which is the most comprehensive free-to-air deal in the history of a few premier Sprintcar venues. It will run from early November 2015 until the end of April 2016. The new program will be known as "Ultimate Sprintcar".

== Motorcycle Speedway returns to Australia ==
Despite Australia being the birthplace of motorcycle speedway in 1923, and producing two World Champions since 2002 in Jason Crump (2004, 2006 and 2009) and Chris Holder (2012), as well as dual Under-21 World Champion Darcy Ward (2009, 2010), the Speedway Grand Prix of Australia has not returned to the Speedway Grand Prix calendar as of 2014.

This is set to change from 2015 with Docklands Stadium in Melbourne, a 53,359-seat stadium with a retractable roof and movable seating, signing a 5-year deal to host the event. Eithad is mostly used by the Australian Football League so a temporary track (early estimates put it at approximately 350 metres (380 yards) long) will need to be installed for the 2015 event scheduled to be held on 24 October (after the end of the 2015 AFL season). The Grand Prix is set to be the 12th and final round of the 2015 Speedway Grand Prix series. Triple World Champion Jason Crump and ten time Australian Champion Leigh Adams will serve as Australian SGP ambassadors in 2015. The Australia national speedway team are one of the major teams in international motorcycle speedway with the country regarded as the birthplace of the sport in the 1920s. The current team is managed by former rider Mark Lemon, (who also managers the Australia national under-21 speedway team) and captained by 2012 World Champion Chris Holder. Australia finished 3rd in the 2014 Speedway World Cup Final on 2 August in Poland.

Of the 15 permanent riders of the SGP, as of 2025, 4 of them are Australian (among the other ones, there are 2 Poles, 2 British, 2 Danish, 1 Swedish, 1 Latvian, 1 Czech, 1 Slovak and 1 German):

- Brady Kurtz
- Jack Holder
- Max Fricke
- Jason Doyle

== Popular events ==
Some of the more notable and popular dirt track races include:

- World Series Sprintcars
- Australian Late Model Championship
- Australian Speedcar Championship
- Australian Sprintcar Championship
- Australian Super Sedan Championship
- Australian Street Stock Championship
- Australian Compact Speedcar Championship
- Australian Individual Speedway Championship
- Australian Sidecar Speedway Championship
- Australian Speedcar Grand Prix
- Grand Annual Sprintcar Classic
- Australian Sprintcar Grand Prix
- Kings Challenge
- National Super Sedan Series
- Sidecar Grand Slam

== Types of classes ==
There are several types of classes in Australian speedway including:

- Sprintcars
- Compact Speedcars (known as TQ Midgets elsewhere)
- Motorcycle speedway
- Sidecar speedway
- Stockcars
- Speedcars (known as Midgets elsewhere)
- VSC Standard Saloons
- VSC Sport Sedans
- Late model
- Open sportsman
- Demolition derbies
- Wingless Sprints
- Formula 500
- Legend Cars
- Monster trucks
- Mod Lites
- V8 Dirt Modifieds
- SSA Street Stocks
- SSA Production Sedans
- SSA Junior Sedans
- SSA National 4s
- SSA Modified Sedans
- SSA Super Sedans

== Venues ==
=== New South Wales ===
- Lismore Speedway
- Loxford Park Speedway
- Newcastle Entertainment Centre
- Sydney Speedway

=== Northern Territory ===
- Arunga Park Speedway
- Katherine Speedway
- Nhulunbuy Speedway
- Northline Speedway
- Tennant Creek Speedway

=== Queensland ===
- Brisbane Exhibition Ground

=== South Australia ===
- Borderline Speedway
- Gillman Speedway
- Murray Bridge Speedway
- Sidewinders U/16 Speedway
- Speedway City
- Wayville Showgrounds

=== Victoria ===
- Avalon Raceway
- Olympic Park Speedway

=== Western Australia ===
- Bunbury Speedway
- Perth Motorplex
