= 2014–15 World Series Sprintcars season =

The 2014–15 World Series Sprintcars (known as the Enzed World Series Sprintcars due to sponsorship) was the 28th running of the World Series Sprintcars in Australia. It ran over 13 rounds from 26 December 2014 until 21 February 2015.

Mount Gambier driver Steven Lines was the defending champion from 2013 to 2014, and looked to defend his title from the likes of multiple Australian champions Max Dumesny, Brooke Tatnell and James McFadden, as well as a host of Australia's top drivers, along with drivers (especially during the start of the season) from the World of Outlaws in the United States, which are in the winter off-season. However, it was Tatnell who won his 9th championship title, after Dave Murcott – who had led Tatnell by 80 points going into the final race at Perth Motorplex – crashed out of the race with 5 laps remaining. Tatnell finished the race in 3rd place, and as a result, claimed the championship by 27 points.

It was the last major sprintcar title for Shane Krikke, the Western Australia-based car owner for Tatnell; Krikke died in June 2016 of cancer.

== Schedule ==
| Round | Track | City/State | Track Length | Date |
|---|---|---|---|---|
| 1 | Speedway City | Virginia, SA | 430 m | 26 December 2014 |
| 2 | Murray Bridge Speedway | Murray Bridge, SA | 360 m | 27 December 2014 |
| 3 | Borderline Speedway | Mount Gambier, SA | 372 m | 28 December 2014 |
| 4 | Avalon Raceway | Lara, Vic | 390 m | 30 December 2014 |
| 5 | Premier Speedway | Warrnambool, Vic | 410 m | 1 January 2015 |
| 6 | Brisbane International Speedway | Brisbane, Qld | 400 m | 4 January 2015 |
| 7 | Brisbane International Speedway | Brisbane, Qld | 400 m | 9 & 10 January 2015 |
| 8 | Murray Bridge Speedway | Murray Bridge, SA | 360 m | 30 January 2015 |
| 9 | Atwell Park Speedway | Albany, WA | 450 m | 6 February 2015 |
| 10 | Perth Motorplex | Kwinana Beach, WA | 500 m | 7 February 2015 |
| 11 | Bunbury Speedway | Bunbury, WA | 530 m | 11 February 2015 |
| 12 | Perth Motorplex | Kwinana Beach, WA | 500 m | 21 February 2015 |

== Races ==
| Round | Time Trials | Car No. | Fast Time | C-Main | Car No. | B-Main | Car No. | A-Main | Car No. | Report |
|---|---|---|---|---|---|---|---|---|---|---|
| 1 | Luke Dillon | S81 | 12.605 | Daryl Clayden | W45 | Brooke Tatnell | W2 | David Murcott | A1 | |
| 2 | Steven Caruso | S10 | 11.538 | Colin Brooks | S62 | David Murcott | A1 | Matt Egel | W53 | |
| 3 | Bradley Keller | S19 | 11.128 | Taylor Milling | W25 | Steven Lines | W3 | Brooke Tatnell | W2 | |
| 4 | James McFadden | NQ25 | 11.949 | Daryl Clayden | W45 | Jye O'Keeffe | V42 | David Murcott | A1 | |
| 5 | Luke Dillon | S81 | 10.901 | Luke Nash | V84 | Danny Holtgraver | Q36 | Jamie Veal | V35 | |
| 6 | Donny Schatz | US15 | 11.828 | Not Held | | Matt Egel | W53 | Donny Schatz | US15 | |
| 7 | Donny Schatz | US15 | 11.956 | Tim Kaeding | N99 | Brooke Tatnell | W2 | Donny Schatz | US15 | |
| 8 | Ryan Jones | S63 | 11.701 | Dylan Jenkin | S51 | Chad Ely | S22 | Steven Lines | W3 | |
| 9 | Ryan Farrell | W26 | 12.335 | Not Held | | Andrew Wright | N78 | Steven Lines | W3 | |
| 10 | Jamie Veal | V35 | 13.842 | Not Held | | Ian Madsen | T10 | Dave Murcott | A1 | |
| 11 | Jamie Veal | V35 | 13.100 | Not Held | | Brent Aprile | NQ42 | James McFadden | NQ25 | |
| 12 | Kyle Hirst | W17 | 13.830 | Not Held | | Ryan Farrell | W26 | Kerry Madsen | N29 | |

Note: In Australia, car numbers are preceded by State of Origin identification.

== See also ==
- Sprint car racing
