= Borderline Speedway =

The Bullring
- Location: Princess Highway, Glenburnie, South Australia
- Coordinates: 37°51′16″S 140°52′01″E
- Capacity: 8,000
- Owner: Borderline Speedway Inc.
- Operator: Borderline Speedway Inc.
- Opened: 1957
- Major events: Australian Sprintcar Championship; Australian Super Sedan Championship; Australian Solo Championship; Australian Street Stock Championship; Australian Modified Production Car Championship; Australian Late Model Championship; World Series Sprintcars; National Super Sedan Series; Kings Challenge; Easter Sprintcar Trail

Oval
- Surface: Clay
- Length: 0.231 miles (0.372 km)
- Race lap record: 00:10.227 (Jamie Veal, , 31/03/2018, Sprintcar)

Borderline Speedway, is a dirt track racing venue in the Australian state of South Australia located in the locality of Glenburnie, South Australia about 8 kilometres (5.0 mi) east of the city of Mount Gambier. Racing at the speedway generally takes place between November and May.

== History ==
Borderline Speedway was opened on 23 February 1957 with stock car racing supported by local motorbike races. The South East Racing Car Club took over the promotion of the speedway in 1961 and six years later production car racing was introduced as were the Super Modifieds (later known as Sprintcars).

The speedway received its first safety fence in 1970 and the light towers were replaced with a single light tower on the infield. To improve lighting, this was soon joined by a second infield light tower.

The old Super Modifieds were phased out and Sprintcars first hit the track in 1977. The next improvement to the speedway came during the mid-1980s when clay was added to the 372 metres (407 yards) track affectionately known as "The Bullring". This unfortunately saw the end of Motorcycle speedway and Sidecar speedway as a regular on the program at Borderline, but two new categories were introduced, the Formula 500's and Street Stocks.

The pit area was expanded in 1985 to accommodate extra vehicles and over $100,000 worth of improvements to the speedway were completed by December 1987.

From 1980, Borderline has been the South Australian venue for the Easter Sprintcar Trail (the other tracks used generally being Victorian tracks Premier Speedway in Warrnambool and the Avalon Raceway in Lara) with some of the biggest names in Australian sprintcar racing taking part including multiple Australian champions Garry Rush, George and Brooke Tatnell (NSW), Max Dumesny and Brett Lacey (Vic), as well as Mount Gambier's own Bill Barrows (the current president of the speedway), David Veal and Steven Lines.

Borderline Speedway was awarded the Australian Sprintcar Championship in 1995, the first time the title had been held in South Australia outside of the state capital Adelaide. The event was a huge success with a crowd of just on 7,500 witnessing Sydney's Garry Brazier retaining his national crown from Brooke Tatnell and 10-time champion Garry Rush. The success of the event saw the introduction of the Kings Challenge which has become an annual event on the Australian calendar since 1995. Traditionally run on the Friday night before the Grand Annual Sprintcar Classic in Warrnambool, the $10,000 to win event was moved to the Thursday night to accommodate the Classic's move to a 3-day event in 2014. With the Kings Challenge running prior to the Classic, the event attracts the best sprintcar drivers from Australia and the United States.

In 2007, Borderline Speedway celebrated its 50th year of continuous operation.

Borderline is also a regular stop for the World Series Sprintcars, and is run as the 3rd meeting of "Speedweek" during the series following Speedway City in Adelaide, Murray Bridge Speedway, and followed by Avalon Raceway and Premier Speedway. The speedway is also a regular venue for the National Super Sedan Series as well as the Sidecar Grand Slam series. Prior to the series demise in 2000, Borderline also hosted rounds of David Tapp's Australian Speedway Masters Series which saw some of Australia's best Solo riders such as Jason Crump, Leigh Adams, Craig Boyce and Ryan Sullivan take on the world's best including World Champions Sam Ermolenko, Billy Hamill and Greg Hancock (USA), Tony Rickardsson (Sweden), Mark Loram, Simon Wigg and Kelvin Tatum (England).

Since hosting the national sprintcar title in 1995, Borderline has also hosted the Australian Super Sedan Championship, Australian Street Stock Championship, Australian Modified Production Car Championship, Australian Late Model Championship, and in 2007 hosted the 5th and final round of the Australian Solo Championship. The event (and the championship) was won by Australia's reigning Speedway World Champion Jason Crump.

== Track information ==
Length - 372 metres (407 yards), 1 metre out from the pole line
Width - 15 metres
Banking - 1.4 metres
Surface - Clay
Safety Fence - 1.2 metre concrete wall with 1.5 metre high weld-mesh topped with 1.6 metre chain mesh above with 1 metre at 45 degree angle to infield with cable attached
Spectator Fence - 2.4 metres high cyclone mesh - 3.6 metres beyond catch fence
Noise Level - 95dba. Effective mufflers are enforced.

== Lap records ==
as of 26 December 2015

=== Cars ===
- 410 Sprintcars: 10.642 - Jamie Veal ( (Victoria (state)) ), 28 December 2014
- Formula 500: 13.10 - Brock Hallett ( (South Australia) ), 28 March 2009
- Speedcars: 13.30 - Steven Graham ( (New South Wales) ), 21 November 1998
- Hot rod: 13.67 - Damian Eve ( (South Australia) ), 2 January 1998
- Super Sedans: 13.47 - Dave Gartner ( (South Australia) ), 21 March 2015
- V8 Dirt Modified: 14.09 - Glen Goonan ( (South Australia) ), 20 November 2004
- V6 Sprints: 14.76 - Steven Agars ( (South Australia) ), 12 December 1998
- Super Rods: 14.81 - Greg Cocayn ( (Tasmania) ), 2 February 2000
- Wingless Sprints: 14.81 - Todd Wigzell ( (South Australia) ), 9 January 2010
- Sportsmans: 15.20 - Barry Ross ( (South Australia) ), 22 April 2000
- Modified Productions: 15.52 - Greg Gartner ( (South Australia) ), 26 February 2000
- AMCA Nationals: 16.17 - Brain Chadwick ( (South Australia) ), 20 November 1999
- Street Stocks: 16.43 - Jason Duell ( (South Australia) ), 22 February 2003
- Junior Sedans: 17.80 - Steven Lines ( (South Australia) ), 20 November 1999

=== Bikes ===
(4 laps clutch start)

- Solos: 58.60 - Billy Hamill ( (United States) ), 15 January 2000
- Sidecars: 1:02.01 - Mark Plaisted ( (South Australia) ) / Sam Gilbert ( (South Australia) ), 12 January 2013
