= Street stocker =

Speedway car type from Australia

A street stocker is a production based speedway car formula raced in every state in Australia. Most are old-style sedans which are cheap to build and maintain. The most competitive series is the Sydney Street Stocker Championship raced at Parramatta City Raceway.

Various speedway boards under the NASR (Australian Speedway National Board) run to their own rules, but they are similar. For example, an ASCF car could run in the RSA championship with minor modifications. Considered the backbone of Australian speedway racing, as it is easily affordable by many. Large fields are commonplace.

Some of the core rules are:

- Sedans only
- No multiple overhead camshafts and only two valves per cylinder
- The vehicle must be in sound condition with all original panels used
- All glass and external mirrors must be removed along with any ornamentation and trim
- The radiator may be relocated inside the car subject to safety rules
- A maximum capacity 30 litre fuel tank must be fitted. The factory tank must be removed.
- Suspension modifications are allowed. Standard mounts must be used.
- The engine must be no larger than 274 ci. No V8s or rotaries.
- No forced induction
- Internal engine modifications are allowed with restrictions
- One single or dual throat carburettor
- Wings are permitted within limits

List of ASCF national champions.

== See also ==
- Oval track
- Short track motor racing
- Dirt track racing in Australia
