= Sydney Speedway =

Racing venue in Eastern Creek, New South Wales

Sydney International Speedway
Sydney II
- Location: 394 Ferrers Road, Eastern Creek NSW
- Coordinates: 33.8189°S 150.8690°E
- Capacity: 10,000
- Operator: Sydney Dragway
- Broke ground: 2021
- Opened: 2022
- Former names: Eastern Creek Speedway
- Major events: World Series Sprintcars; Australian Sprintcar Championship; Australian Speedcar Championship; Australian Super Sedan Championship; Australian Late Model Championship; National Super Sedan Series; World of Outlaws; NSW Sprintcar Championship

Oval
- Surface: Clay
- Length: 0.311 mi (0.500 km)
- Banking: Semi-banked
- Race lap record: 0:11.500 (Sammy Walsh, Rocket Industries, 2017, 410 Sprintcar)

Sydney International Speedway, known as Sydney II as its successor to the original circuit, is a dirt track racing venue held near the shutdown area of Sydney Dragway in Eastern Creek. Like the original, it is about 500m (0.311 miles) in length (489m at the lowest line, 511m near the wall).

The name "Sydney II" differentiates it from the former Sydney Speedway (known commercially as Valvoline Raceway and formerly as Parramatta Speedway, and often referenced as Sydney Speedway I to differentiate with its successor) on the site of the Granville Showgrounds in Sydney, marking the second consecutive round with Supercars paired with sprint car racing.

== History ==
Speedway racing had taken place at the Granville Showgrounds during the 1930s with races using the existing ½-mile harness racing track. However, with speedway already established at the Sydney Showground Speedway and Sydney Sports Ground, as well as racing at the nearby Cumberland Oval, racing at Granville was short-lived.

The new 460-metre-long (500-yard) clay surfaced oval was the brainchild of former Sydney driver Sid Hopping, who wanted to give Sydney a track purpose-built for the new, faster breed of American-style sprintcars. Sydney's two other tracks at the time, the Showground and the Liverpool Speedway, did run sprintcars, though the Showground was deemed too narrow while Liverpool had changed from dirt to bitumen in 1974, which suited the sedans, but not so much the Super Modifieds (later to become sprintcars) and Speedcars.

The clay track at the Granville Showgrounds was laid out and first practices took place in January 1977 to test out the track. Hopping and his partner Bert Wilder ran meetings on Friday nights so as not to compete with the Showground or Liverpool, which raced on Saturday nights. From its opening, the new speedway became known as the premier sprintcar track in Australia, a title it still enjoys as of 2015. With its wide open spaces (the track itself has no actual safety fence, with the old trotting track forming a barrier between the track and the outside safety fence) and short straights, Parramatta City Raceway was home to some of the country's best drivers, including multiple Australian Champions Garry Rush, George and Brooke Tatnell, Bob Tunks, and Skip Jackson, as well as other top drivers including Bob "The Streak" Blacklaw, former motocross star Stephen Gall. and John Walsh.

Since its opening, the speedway has hosted the Australian Sprintcar Championship on six occasions (1978, 1992, 1997, 2002, 2008, 2017), as well as the Australian Speedcar Championship (1988, 1994, 2006) and the Australian Super Sedan Championship (2003). It also hosted rounds of David Tapp's Australian Speedway Masters Series for Solos (in a rare visit to the track) and in 2004 became the first speedway outside of North or Central America to host the famed World of Outlaws sprintcar series, which featured some of America's best taking on the locals. The winner of the event was Outlaws 'King' and regular visitor to both Australia and Parramatta, Steve Kinser. The event eventually forced local sprintcar authorities to consider switching from a 372 ci engine formula to the more familiar 410ci formula used by sprintcars elsewhere. Valvoline Raceway has also been the venue for the Australian Sprintcar Grand Prix since its inception in 1979 as well as hosting the Australian Speedcar Grand Prix in 1997, 1998, 2001 and 2011. In 2015, the track hosted the Speed Energy Formula Off-Road truck racing series, popularly known as the Stadium Super Trucks, as a support event for the Ultimate Sprintcar Championship; Sheldon Creed went on to win the first (and only) Formula Off-Road race held at Valvoline Raceway.

Wayne Fisher set the very first one-lap record on 9 December 1977 with a time of 16.70 seconds. On 1 April 2017, Sammy Walsh set the current the one-lap record with an 11.500.

== Closure and Sydney II ==
In October 2019, it was announced Sydney Speedway is to close to make way for a Sydney Metro West maintenance facility. The NSW Government promised to rebuild the speedway in a different location in Sydney.

In December 2020, the new Sydney International Speedway within the Western Sydney Parklands at Eastern Creek was approved, and construction began in 2021. The new speedway is located south of the Sydney Motorsport Park and next to the chute at Sydney Dragway.

Sydney Speedway officially closed on the 10 April 2021. A final farewell was given to the event, held at the carpark of the venue.

Sydney II, originally known as Eastern Creek Speedway, was originally set to open on 25 February 2022, but with weather delays, opened on 12 March 2022 with a 35-lap sprint car feature won by Jamie Veal, shortened to 18 laps because of curfew. It is located at 394 Ferrers Road, Eastern Creek in New South Wales. Sydney II hosted the 2023 Australian Speedcar Championship won by United States Auto Club star Brady Bacon. In 2025, a sprint car meeting will be held as part of the 2025 Supercars Championship.

== Midnite Spares ==
Parramatta City Raceway was used during filming for scenes of the 1983 Australian movie Midnite Spares about a young sprintcar driver, Steve Hall, who had returned to Sydney from Queensland to team up with his father on both the track and in his dad's towing business, only to find that his dad had gone missing (presumed and later confirmed murdered) and his business partner being pressured into becoming part of a 'midnite spares' network for stolen cars. A number of scenes were shot at the speedway with a number of drivers having cameo appearances (as themselves) including Garry Rush, George Tatnell, Terry Becker, and Bob Blacklaw. Local driver Rob Worthington stood in for lead actor James Laurie during the racing scenes.

During filming for the movie, focus puller David Brostoff was killed when he was hit by a sprintcar driven by Steve Brazier Jr. The movie was dedicated to the memory of Brostoff.

== Lap records ==
As of November 2015 all are 1 lap with a rolling start.

- 410 Sprintcars: 11.500 – (New South Wales) Sammy Walsh, 1 April 2017
- Speedcars: 14.349 – (New South Wales) Craig Brady, 26 January 2001
- Late model: 14.523 – (South Australia) Daryl Grimson, 26 March 2011
- Litre Sprints: 14.568 – (New South Wales) Andrew Wright, 12 June 1999
- Super Sedans: 15.739 – (New South Wales) John Pyne, 16 October 1999
- V8 Dirt Modifieds: 15.982 – (United States) Tim Fuller, 2 November 1996
- Wingless Sprints: 16.819 – (Victoria (state)) Andy Hibbert, 27 January 2012
- AMCA Nationals: 18.127 – (New South Wales) Luke Pyne, 6 February 1999
