= National Super Sedan Series =

The National Super Sedan Series was a Dirt track racing series held in Australia for Super Sedans and was sanctioned by the national controlling body, the Australian Saloon Car Federation (ASCF).

Inaugurated in 2006, the series was separate to the Australian Super Sedan Championship. The winner of the 2006 series was Queensland driver Wayne Randall. Queensland drivers have dominated the series since its inception winning all bar the 2011–12 series. Darren Kane is the series most successful driver. The 2008/09 Australian Champion has won the NSSS on five occasions with one second- and one third-place finish.

The series generally ran from January to April each year with races at tracks such as the Perth Motorplex, Speedway City in Adelaide, Borderline Speedway in Mount Gambier, Murray Bridge Speedway, Valvoline Raceway in Sydney and the Archerfield Speedway in Brisbane.

South Australian veteran Bill Miller, who in his families tradition in Super Sedans drives a pink coloured car as did his mother Joan (who started racing in a Mini at Adelaide's old Rowley Park Speedway in the 1960s) and older brother Stephen, is the only driver to have driven in every single round of the National Super Sedan Series since its inception in 2006.

The 2014/2015 series was the last time the National Super Sedan Series was held.

== Winners since 2006 ==
Year	Winner	Runner-up	3rd place
2006	Wayne Randall (Qld)	Jamie McHugh (Qld)	John Leslight (NSW)
2006–07	Wayne Randall (Qld)	Michael Gee (Qld)	John Leslight (NSW)
2007–08	Michael Doblo (Qld)	Wayne Brims (NSW)	Jamie McHugh (Qld)
2008–09	Darren Kane (Qld)	Matt Pascoe (Qld)	Marc Giancola (WA)
2009–10	Matt Pascoe (Qld)	Darren Kane (Qld)	Dave Gartner (SA)
Year	Winner	Runner-up	3rd place
2010–11	Darren Kane (Qld)	Trent Wilson (Qld)	Brad Smith (Tas)
2011–12	Brad Smith (Tas)	Steve Jordan (Qld)	Darren Kane (Qld)
2012–13	Darren Kane (Qld)	Matt Pascoe (Qld)	Lachlan Onley (NSW)
2013–14	Darren Kane (Qld)	Matt Pascoe (Qld)	Mick Nicola (Vic)
2014–15	Darren Kane (Qld)	Dave Gartner (SA)	Kodee Brown (WA)

== See also ==
- Sport in Australia
