= Grenville Anderson =

Australian racing driver (1951–2004)

- Nationality: Australia
- Born: 26 November 1951
- Died: 31 May 2004 (aged 52)

Championship titles
- 1975/76, 1977/78, 1979/80, 1992/93: Australian Super Sedan Championship

Grenville Anderson (26 November 1951 – 31 May 2004) was an Australian auto racing driver, considered one of the icons of Australian sedan racing. He was the first driver in Australian speedway history to win four Australian Super Sedan Championships. Anderson began his racing career in a 1957 Vauxhall Velox at the old Surfers Paradise Speedway and steadily progressed to an XU-1 Torana. In 1975, Anderson’s father purchased a stroker motor from Bill Mann and success was instant with wins throughout New South Wales and Queensland. NSW North Coast businessman Peter Croke bought the XU-1 and kept Anderson on as the driver. The combination won the 1976 Australian Title at Rowley Park, placed fourth a year later in Tasmania while also winning the NSW Title at Goulburn and took out features in Newcastle, Uralla, Lismore and Toowoomba.Anderson won his second Australian Title in 1978 at the Claremont Speedway in Perth and finished second in 1979 at Toowoomba bouncing back to claim the 1980 Title at Bagot Park in the Northern Territory. Anderson rolled his Torana while defending his title at Newcastle in 1981 and in 1982 Anderson scaled down his racing commitments, driving the second car out of the Croke stable to second place in the Australian Championship at Brooklyn in Victoria.Croke became disillusioned with the way sedan racing was turning in Australia and it took eight long years before Anderson returned to speedway in 1989. Not long after another successful partnership was formed with car owner Murray Gegg, of Murray’s race parts in Nerang. The Chevrolet Camaro was replaced by a CJ Rayburn Chassis built by Nick Girdlestone with a Holden Commodore body and a Mann engine. The car was fast and set track records at Brisbane, Lismore, Newcastle and Canberra culminating in winning the 1993 Australian Championship at Latrobe in Tasmania and the East Coast Grand National. He died on 31 May 2004 as a consequence of injuries he sustained at the then Archerfield Speedway, now Brisbane International Speedway, on 8 May 1993, some 11 years earlier. Anderson, who was running hot laps in practice for the 1993/94 Australian Championship for which he was the defending champion and favourite to win his fifth title, climbed the concrete wall between turns 1 and 2, and rode along the top of the wall for approximately 30 metres. As the wall ended into the pits his car flipped onto the right hand side and struck a concrete retaining wall on the driver's side with his head striking the wall. Grenville preferred using a motocross style helmet over using the traditional style of racing helmet used at the time.

In 2007, Anderson was one of the first ten people inducted into the Australian Speedway Hall of Fame.

== Australian Super Sedan Title ==
After spending over a decade not finishing on the Aussie title podium, Anderson was the class of the field in the 1991/92 title at Adelaide's Speedway Park, with most believing that only trouble in the Final would prevent him winning his fourth National crown. Car trouble put him out halfway through the Final which was eventually won by reigning South Australian Champion and local Speedway Park hotshot Brad Scotcher. Anderson made up for his Adelaide failure the next year, winning his record fourth Australian Championship in Latrobe, Tasmania.

- Winner in 1975/76 at Rowley Park Speedway in Adelaide, South Australia
- Winner in 1977/78 at Claremont Speedway in Perth, Western Australia
- 2nd in 1978/79 at Charlton Raceway in Toowoomba, Queensland
- Winner in 1979/80 at Bagot Park in Darwin, Northern Territory
- Winner in 1992/93 at Latrobe Speedway in Latrobe, Tasmania

== Winners of Grenville Anderson East Coast Grand National ==
- 2010 – Tania Smith driving a Danny Smith built Rocket racecar
- 2011 – Darren Kane driving the Ian Boettcher sponsored Dominator racecar
- 2023 - Matt Pascoe.
