= Australian Late Model Championship =

Dirt track racing championship

The Australian Late Model Championship is a Dirt track racing championship held each year to determine the Australian Late model national champion. The championship is held over a single meeting (usually on consecutive nights) and has run annually since the 2001/02 season and is awarded to a different state of Australia each year.

The first championship was run at the Quit Motorplex (later renamed Perth Motorplex) in Kwinana Beach, Western Australia and was won by veteran Queensland driver Allan Butcher.

Western Australia's Brad Blake holds the record having won 5 of the 14 championships run until 2015. Blake also finished second in the championship on 3 occasions

The 2014/15 Australian championship was held at the Lucas Oil Kingaroy Speedway in Kingaroy, Queensland. Queensland driver and former Australian Super Sedan Champion Darren Kane won his first national Late Model championship.

The 2015/16 championship was scheduled to be held at the Perth Motorplex on 15–16 January 2016.

== Winners since 2002 ==
Year	Venue	City/State	Winner	Runner-up	3rd place
2001/02	Quit Motorplex	Kwinana Beach, WA	Allan Butcher (Qld)	Brad Blake (WA)	Brad Ludlow (WA)
2002/03	Quit Motorplex	Kwinana Beach, WA	Ryan Halliday (WA)	Brad Blake (WA)	Brad Ludlow (WA)
2003/04	Quit Motorplex	Kwinana Beach, WA	Brad Blake (WA)	Marc Giancola (WA)	Jaron Crane (WA)
2004/05	Quit Motorplex	Kwinana Beach, WA	Bruce Trenaman (WA)	Michael Hebditch (ACT)	Brad Ludlow (WA)
2005/06	Perth Motorplex	Kwinana Beach, WA	Brad Blake (WA)	Ryan Halliday (WA)	Brad Ludlow (WA)
2006/07	Perth Motorplex	Kwinana Beach, WA	Brad Blake (WA)	Warren Oldfield (WA)	Brad Ludlow (WA)
2007/08	Perth Motorplex	Kwinana Beach, WA	Brad Ludlow (WA)	Ben Ludlow (WA)	Ron Miller ( (United States) )
2008/09	Perth Motorplex	Kwinana Beach, WA	Marc Giancola (WA)	Brad Blake (WA)	Ben Ludlow (WA)
Year	Venue	City/State	Winner	Runner-up	3rd place
2009/10	Manjimup Speedway	Manjimup, WA	Marc Giancola (WA)	Bert Vosbergen (WA)	Jac Dolmans Jr. (WA)
2010/11	Timmis Speedway	Mildura, Vic	Brad Blake (WA)	Blair Grainger (Qld)	Mat Crimmins (SA)
2011/12	Sydney Speedway	Sydney, NSW	Steve Francis ( (United States) )	Jamie Oldfield (WA)	Michael Holmes (WA)
2012/13	Bunbury Speedway	Bunbury, WA	Steve Francis ( (United States) )	Craig Vosbergen (WA)	Warren Oldfield (WA)
2013/14	Borderline Speedway	Mount Gambier, SA	Brad Blake (WA)	Daryl Grimon (SA)	David Robertson (NSW)
2014/15	Kingaroy Speedway	Kingaroy, Qld	Darren Kane (Qld)	Jamie Oldfield (WA)	Ben Nicastri (NSW)
2015/16	Perth Motorplex	Kwinana Beach, WA	Kodee Brown (WA)	Ryan Halliday (WA)	Kye Blight (WA)
2016/17	Premier Speedway	Warrnambool, Vic	Callum Harper (Tas)	David Doherty (NSW)	Paul Stubber (WA)
2017/18	River View Speedway	Murray Bridge, SA	Darren Kane (Qld)	Craig Vosbergen (WA)	Ryan Alexander (SA)
2018/19	Parramatta Raceway	Sydney, NSW	Paul Stubber (WA)	Cameron Pearson (Vic)	Jay Cardy (WA)
2019/20	Perth Motorplex	Kwinana Beach, WA	Kye Blight (WA)	Craig Vosbergen (WA)	Warren Oldfield (WA)
2020/21	Premier Speedway	Warrnambool, Vic			

== See also ==
- Motorsport in Australia
