= Open sportsman =

Form of automobile racing

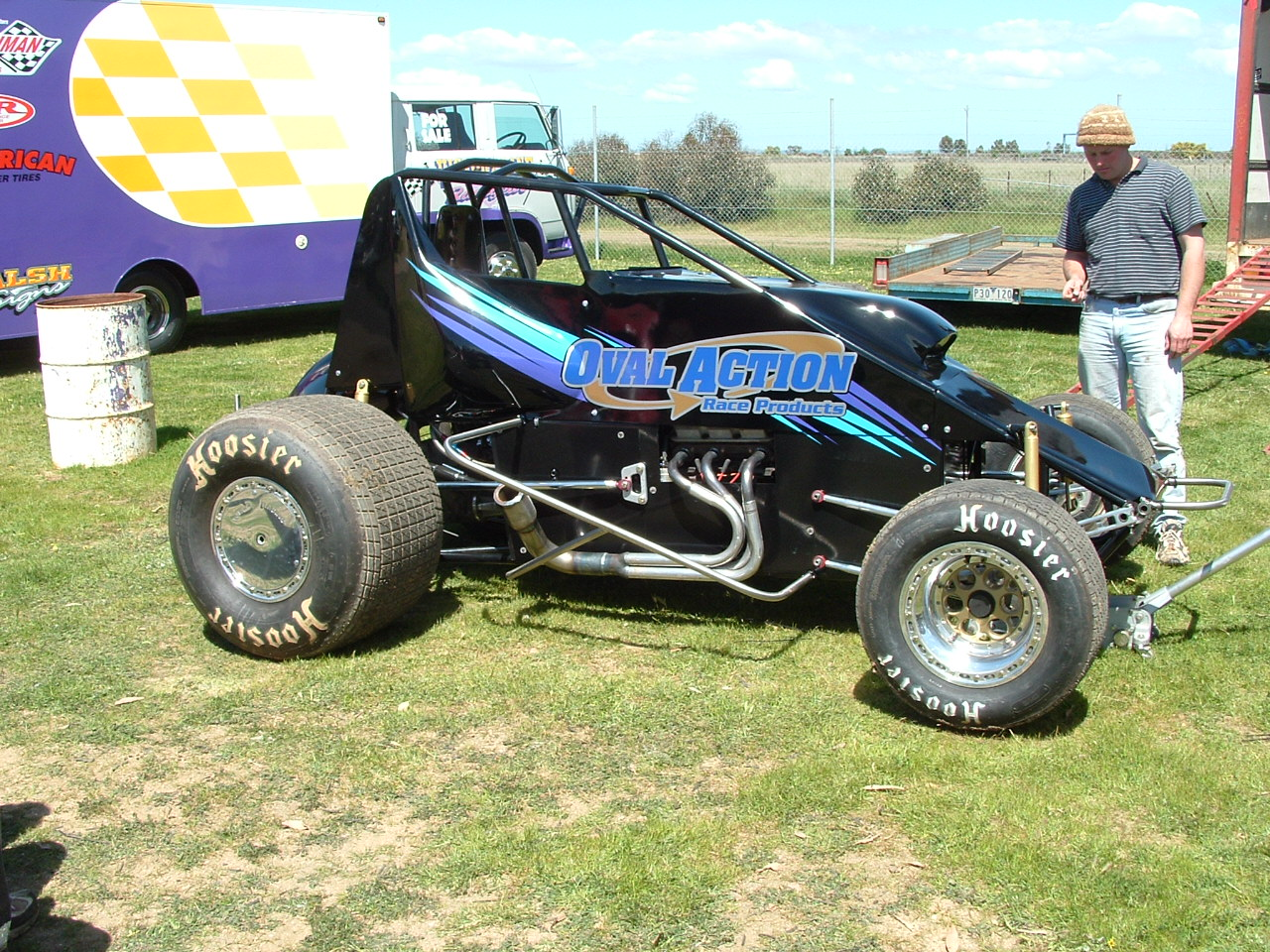
NOS Sprints 'Wingless V6 Sprintcar'

Open sportsman racing is a form of automobile racing found mainly in southwest Victoria held on dirt track speedways of approximately one quarter-mile in length.

== NOS Sprints ==
NOS Sprints (National Open Sportsman Sprints), or "Sporties", as they are referred to by racers, are automobiles that have been based on sprintcar chassis but with the use of a cheaper alternative Buick V6 3.8L pre-ecotec engine. NOS Sprints do not use wings or aerofoils and so look like a wingless sprintcar USAC.

== The early years ==
In 1964 sportsmans were born, they were basically cut down versions of cars from the era, using side-valve Ford engines and steel bodies.

Super Modifieds began in the 1970s, which used V8 engines such as the 283 cu in (4,640 cc) Chevy and 272 cu in (4,460 cc) Customline engines. This division soon turned into sprintcars in the mid 70's. Standard sportsmans however continued to use smaller six-cylinder engines.

During the 1980s, there became another tear-away division called Limited Sportsmans, these were mainly run in the Wimmera and Mallee regions and are still quite a strong class today in Western Victoria and across the border into South Australia.

NOS Sprints however continued to use more and more sprintcar components such as quick-change diffs and chrome-moly custom built chassis. It was around the year 2000 where open sportsmans decided to change race-direction to further utilise second hand parts from sprintcars. This change has been very beneficial to the class. During this year there was the introduction of the Buick V6 engine to phase out the currently used Holden and Ford inline six-cylinder motors. The political shift from open sportsman, which were a VSC (Victorian Speedway Commission) sanctioned class, to breaking away to form NOS Sprints under the SCCA, was due to a desire by the controlling group of competitors within Victoria wishing to exclude the competition of the 4.0-litre Ford inline six, which was due to be given full competition approval, after a two-year trial by one competitor to prove it to be cost effective and fair competition to the Buick and Holden motors. This one key point, of banning all other makes of engine, whilst not necessarily making it any more cost effective, does separate it from other more highly rated speedway classes such as F500 (600cc microsprints) and sprintcars. As of season 2007–2008, NOS Sprints will have phased out the inline motors completely, sticking with stock standard VN-VR Commodore engines.

== The engine ==
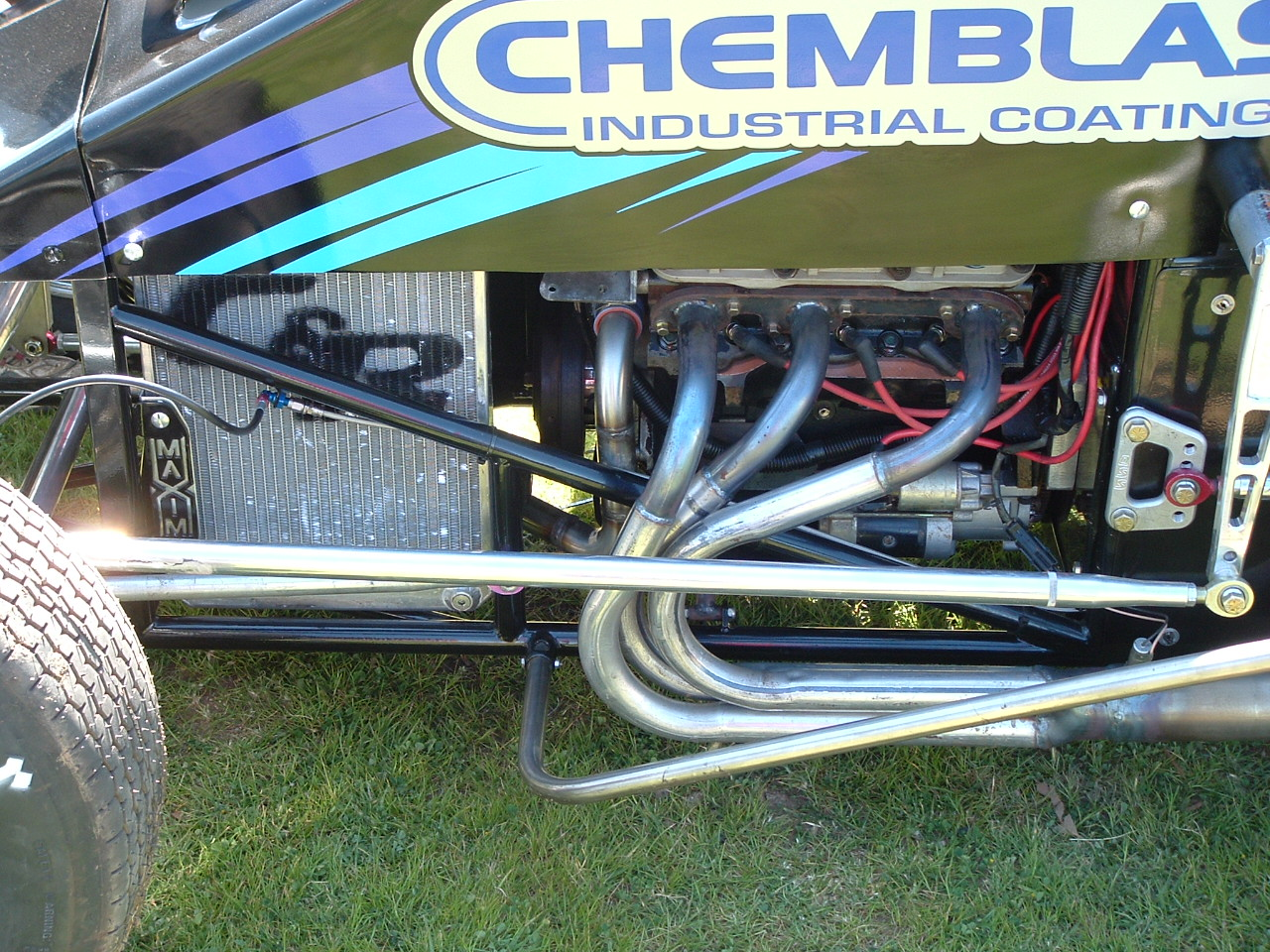
Side view of 3800 cc V6 engine

The Holden/Buick V6 engine has been chosen due to its strong power with little modifications. This in turn has created racing NOS Sprints a very cheap and good entry level class to start speedway racing. Custom made engine spacer plates and cotton-reel adapters have now been made and can be bought off the shelf, these components allow the Buick V6 block to turn into a Chevy block pattern allowing easy bolt-in to standard sprintcar engine plates.

The cotton-reel adaptor fills the gap between the V6 flexplate and starter motor and adapts straight to sprintcar driveshaft uni-joint. Every other component on the cars are modern sprintcar parts. With the Holden V6 adapter, the driver simply locks the quick-change diff into gear, then flicks an ignition "on" switch and holds down their starter button. The car will then engage the starter motor turning the engine crank and driveline projecting the car forwards, once the cars has cranked to enough speed the engine will fire and the car will be in gear ready to race.

Modifications allowed to the engine are; changing the injectors or modifying them to be able to run methanol fuel, relocating the throttle body from the rear of the engine to the top of the plenum chamber, using custom built extractor type exhaust manifolds and finally modifying the computer chip to run a maximum rev limiter of 6000 rpm and tuning the fuel maps to suit the new extractors and the methanol fuel.

== Where NOS Sprints race ==
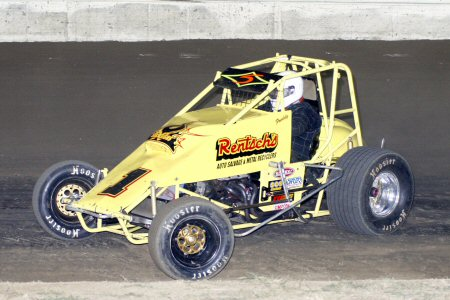
Racing in 2006

Sporties race across the western part of Victoria during the summer months across tracks such as:

Speedway	Location	Track length
Avalon Raceway	Geelong	390 m (0.24 mi)
Redline Raceway	Ballarat	420 m (0.26 mi)
Simpson Speedway	Simpson	400 m (0.25 mi)
Western Speedway	Hamilton	446 m (0.277 mi)
Laang Speedway	Laang	280 m (0.17 mi)
Blue Ribbon Raceway	Horsham	410 m (0.25 mi)
Darlington Speedway	Mortlake	380 m (0.24 mi)
Premier Speedway	Warrnambool	410 m (0.25 mi)
Southern 500 Speedway	Portland	370 m (0.23 mi)
Borderline Speedway	Mount Gambier (South Australia)	370 m (0.23 mi)
Sonic Speedway	Swan Hill	420 m (0.26 mi)

There has also been some interest from other tracks in the future such as:

Speedway	Location	Track length
Rushworth Speedway	Rushworth	m
Rolling Thunder Raceway	Bacchus Marsh	520 m (0.32 mi)

== See also ==
- Sprint car racing
- United States Automobile Club
- Dirt track racing in Australia
