= Rowley Park Speedway =

Former dirt track racing venue

The Place Where Champions Gather The Brick Pit The Butter Box
- Location: Torrens Road, Brompton, South Australia
- Coordinates: 34°53′36″S 138°34′36″E
- Capacity: 15,000
- Owner: Soccer Association of South Australia
- Operator: Wal Watson (1949–1951); Alf Shields (1951–1954); Kym Bonython (1954–1973); The Consortium consisting of Kevin Fischer, Cec Eichler, Rex Sendy and Ray Skipper (1973/74); Racing Drivers Association of South Australia (1974–1979)
- Opened: 21 December 1949
- Closed: 6 April 1979
- Major events: Australian Sprintcar Championship; Australian Speedcar Championship; Australian Super Sedan Championship; Australian Solo Championship; Australian Sidecar Championship; Rick Harvey Memorial; Harry Neale Memorial; Golden Fleece 50 Lap Speedcar Derby; Australasian Solo Final; Various SA Championships

Oval
- Surface: Dolomite
- Length: 0.222 mi (0.358 km)
- Race lap record: 0:14.8 (Jimmy Sills ( (United States) ) / Steve brazier ( (Australia) ), 1978, Sprintcar)

Rowley Park Speedway is a former dirt track racing venue that was located on Torrens Road in Brompton, South Australia and supplanted the Kilburn speedway (1946–1951) on Churchill Road, and the earlier Camden motordrome (1935–1941) on the Bay Road. The speedway ran continually during Australia's speedway seasons (usually October to April) from its opening meeting on 21 December 1949 until its last meeting on 6 April 1979.

== History ==
Rowley Park was originally conceived in 1948 by a group of Kilburn Speedway Speedcar drivers who were disgruntled with its Melbourne-based promoters Kirjon Speedway. The Soccer Association of South Australia owned the site of a former "pughole" (South Australian term for a clay pit or brick pit) on Torrens Rd. at Brompton named Rowley Park which was located only 5 km from the city and the original plan was for the land to be the home of soccer in South Australia. It was purchased by, and named after Ted Rowley, an English-born dentist who moved to Adelaide from Kalgoorlie in 1908 where he had forged a reputation as being Western Australia's best goalkeeper. However, the Soccer Association had received bad press regarding its failure to grow grass on the site. Rowley Park also had a tendency to flood during winter as the bottom of "The Brick Pit" was below the level of the water table, which made playing soccer virtually impossible.

The Soccer Association then obtained a lease on Hindmarsh Oval from the Hindmarsh Council but, as owners of Rowley Park, were keen to make money from it rather than let it sit unused. The initial lease for the speedway was £26 per meeting plus a toll of one penny per head through the gate, based on a minimum of 23 race meetings per season.

The speedway was originally shaped with four distinct corners and the safety fence was almost rectangular in shape and was nicknamed "The Butter Box". The first meeting at Rowley Park took place on Wednesday 21 December 1949. The original promoter of Rowley Park Speedway was Wal Watson, one of the group of disgruntled drivers who brought about the new speedway. In 1951 Watson sold the lease to former Sydney solo rider and speedcar driver of the 1930s, Alf Shields, who had moved his family to Adelaide. During his time as promoter, Shields also regularly drove speedcars at his own track. Shields ran and gradually improved the speedway until 1954 when he sold the lease to local entrepreneur Kym Bonython. For the next 20 years Bonython, who had first attended speedway as a young boy in the late 1920s at the Wayville Showgrounds, successfully set about making Rowley Park Speedway the place to be in Adelaide on a Friday night during the summer.

In 1953 the track surface was changed from shell grit and brick pipe clay to dolomite, which was ideal for both cars and bikes at the time. In 1955 the track was given a more oval shape and its length became 358 metres (392 yards), with a circumference of 402 metres (440 yards) (the track length would not be changed again). A safety catch fence was also added on top of the existing safety fence, which was re-shaped to follow the track in 1955. The catch fencing was upgraded again in 1965 and lasted until the track's closing in 1979. The chain mesh used in the catch fence was of such a heavy gauge steel that it was then transferred and used at the new Speedway Park track that opened in November 1979, while the catch fence itself was sold to the similar sized (372 metres (407 yards)) Borderline Speedway in Mount Gambier.

Under the promotion of Bonython and his company Speedway Pty Ltd, Rowley Park Speedway began attracting crowds every Friday night upwards of 15,000. This era was aptly named "The golden era of speedway" in Australia with large crowds attending meetings in other cities around Australia such as (Sydney Showground), (BrisbaneEkka) and Perth Claremont Speedway. "Friday night is Speedway night" was the publicity slogan Bonython used for Rowley Park, as was a cartoon, with the words "Almost everybody goes to Rowley Park on Friday nights", which showed everyone from a grandmother to ambulance drivers (complete with a bandaged patient on a stretcher), and a jockey all making their way into the speedway. In January 1963 a reported crowd of 20,000 "Pie Eaters" (Bonython's nickname for the regular speedway crowd) packed into the speedway to see Australia's first Demolition Derby. The South Australia Police were called in to handle traffic and hundreds of fans were turned away as the 'House Full' signs went up. The derby itself had 100 entrants and lasted for over 75 minutes.

Another of Bonython's ideas was to import overseas drivers and riders to race full seasons at Rowley Park. His first import was speedcar driver Dick Brown from the US, then in 1957–58 Bonython contracted Bob Tattersall from Streator, Illinois, in the United States, arguably the most popular American speedcar driver ever to race in Australia, and the winner of the 1969 USAC National Midget Series. Unlike other American drivers or overseas solo riders who had raced in Australia until that point, whose fees had been paid for by various promoters ensuring they would appear at tracks around the country, Bonython was forced to pay Tattersall himself when others showed a lack of interest. Tattersall's crowd-pleasing performances at Rowley Park soon had other promoters changing their tunes though. "Tats" as he was known, made his international debut racing a V8/60 at Rowley Park, but ended his first night in hospital after an accident in the speedcar feature race where he hit the turn 3 fence, causing him to miss the next month's racing. One of his races at Rowley Park has gone down in history, and will forever be remembered by all those who witnessed it. During the feature of the 50 Lap Australian Speedcar Derby on 2 February 1962, Tattersall's car lost its inside (left) front wheel on lap 26, but showed his enormous skill by driving the next 20 laps (approx. 7 km!) on three wheels. Legend has Tats winning that race, though the reality was that he retired only 3 laps from the finish with engine failure and the win being taken by local driver Ron Wood. After 13 years racing in Australia, his final win 'down under' came on 13 February 1970 at Rowley Park. Born in 1924, Tattersall died of cancer at his home in Streator in 1971, having been first diagnosed with the disease in Adelaide shortly after his final race there.

For the 1959–60 season, Bonython also went all out and paid for Peter Craven, the 1955 World Champion from England, to be based at the speedway for the Australian season. At Rowley Park Craven would be regularly matched against the 1951 and 1952 World Champion, Adelaide's own Jack Young and would become a crowd favourite at the speedway. Another import was in the very next season in 1960–61, when a young solo rider from Christchurch in New Zealand named Ivan Mauger raced the Australian season primarily at Rowley Park. Mauger would go on to win a record six individual Speedway World Championships, and 15 World titles overall with wins in World Pairs, Teams and Long Track championships before retiring in 1986. It was while competing at Rowley Park that Mauger became friends with Jack Young, the rider he regards as his speedway idol. Mauger would later credit Young with setting him on the path to becoming a World Champion. To supplement his income while living in Adelaide so he would be able to support his young family, Bonython also found Mauger work as a Truck driver.

Kym Bonython also brought out American speedcar driver Jimmy Davies in 1963. During his short time in Australia (he was killed in a crash in 1966 at the Santa Fe Speedway in Chicago), Davies compiled a remarkable record, especially at Rowley Park. He won three of his four races on debut at the speedway on 11 January 1963 and set a new 15 lap record. Overall he won 31 of his 34 starts at Rowley Park, while placing second in the other 3 starts. Davies' major wins in Adelaide included the South Australian Speedcar Championship in 1963 and 1964, as well as the "Rick Harvey Memorial".

During the early 1970s, Kym Bonython saw that crowds at the speedway were starting to drop. This was due to competing attractions such as television. Prior to this, there had actually been little competition for the spectators money. The Six o'clock swill was still in effect until 1967 in South Australia (pubs were forced to close at 6 PM), cricket was still played during the daytime, Harness racing was held on Saturday nights at Wayville and later Globe Derby Park, at the time Greyhound racing was banned in Adelaide, while television was still in its infancy. Keen to further his interests in the art world, Bonython moved his family to Sydney and bought an art gallery and sold the lease on Rowley Park to a consortium of local former race drivers – Kevin Fischer, Cec Eichler, Rex Sendy and Ray Skipper, thus ending a successful 20 years as Rowley Park's promoter. The consortium only ran the show for one season (1973–74) before it was taken over by the Racing Drivers' Association of South Australia. The RDA would run the speedway from 1974 until the track closed in 1979. After Bonython sold the lease he made a number of appearances at the speedway until it closed with people continually asking him to come back, though he was never tempted knowing that times had changed.

Bonython himself wasn't just the promoter and director of Rowley Park Speedway. He was also a speedcar driver who had considerable success winning the South Australian Championship in 1960. He was also involved in some of the more spectacular crashes seen at the speedway, though luckily he didn't suffer any serious injuries at the wheel in an era when driver safety wasn't a major concern and major injuries or even death was accepted as just part of the sport (during the 1960s, an average of 1.9 drivers and riders lost their lives in Australian speedway each season).

In addition to the various state and national championships held at the speedway, it also held two memorial race meetings for the Speedcars. These were the "Harry Neale Memorial" and the "Rick Harvey Memorial", both named for popular drivers at Rowley Park during the 1950s. Neale, nicknamed "The Black Prince", was South Australia's most successful driver who won the Australian Speedcar Championship in 1953, 1954, 1955, 1956, 1958 and 1959, as well as the Australian Speedcar Grand Prix and Speedcar World Derby in 1958. Neale was killed in a crash at Perth's Claremont Speedway on 6 February 1959 at the age of 39. Harvey, a motorcycle cop with the South Australian Police, died in a road accident in 1956 while on duty. Harvey, who was 27 at the time of his death, was killed along with his partner, Constable John Raggatt, and a third motorcyclist, Giovanni Cragnolin. When speedway racing in Adelaide moved to Speedway Park in 1979, the Harry Neale and Rick Harvey Memorials were run there for many years.

Rowley Park Speedway's long-time Clerk of Course was Glen Dix, who would later become internationally famous as the man who waved the checkered flag at the Australian Grand Prix during its years in Adelaide (1985–1995). Dix was first involved at the speedway in 1952–53 when he 'pencilled' information for 5KA radio announcer Bill Evans who broadcast the feature races live. Dix became the Assistant Clerk of Course in 1953–54, before becoming Clerk of Course from 1954 to 1955, a position he would hold for ten years. For the first few years he also controlled the bike races until the Speedway Riders' Association selected their own starter. As a flagman, Dix became famous for waving the checkered flag in the same enthusiastic manner for every car that crossed the finish line, no matter whether the driver finished in first or last place, a trait he continued at the Formula One Grand Prix meetings.

Due to the growing number of complaints from residents about noise and the on-street parking, with some of the residents having friends on the Adelaide City Council who began placing restrictions on the speedway such as parking, noise and time constraints, as well as the track becoming too small for the faster cars appearing on the scene (primarily the Sprintcars which had evolved from the old Modified Rods), the speedway was closed after the 23rd meeting of the 1978–79 season, which was held on 6 April 1979. Ironically, exactly the same reasons would see the end of the Sydney Showground Speedway just a year later. Speedway continued in Adelaide the following season with the opening of the new Speedway Park complex located adjacent to the Adelaide International Raceway in Virginia, approximately 25 km north of Adelaide, while in 1981 a new motorcycle-only speedway named North Arm Speedway was opened in the industrial suburb of Gillman. Speedway Park is still in operation as at 2015, now under the name of "Speedway City", while North Arm continued until 1997 when the Government of South Australia which owned the land the speedway was on, reclaimed it, leaving Adelaide without an operating motorcycle speedway for the first time since 1926. This would be rectified in 1998 with the opening of what is generally regarded as the best motorcycle-only speedway in Australia, Gillman Speedway.

At Rowley Park's final meeting, the feature race winners were: Graham Mason (Stock Rods), Bill Wigzell (Sprintcar), George Tatnell (Speedcar), Tony Orlando (Saloon Cars), Leigh Wingard (Sidecar stars) and Lou Sansom (Solos). Also on hand to farewell the speedway was former track promoter Kym Bonython, who, while sitting in a Speedcar for an interview by Sydney-based Channel 10 television compare Steve Raymond (who was also the track announcer at the Liverpool Speedway in Sydney where his brother Mike Raymond was not only a Channel 7 motor racing commentator, but also the Liverpool track promoter), was hit twice in the face with a cream pie by his long-time friend George Tatnell (also from Sydney). With cream covering his face, race suit and his special helmet complete with drawings of naked ladies, Bonython laughed and said "I didn't know Tatnell was there. I knew he was on the grounds which was dangerous enough."

Rowley Park was unique in Australian speedway in that it was in a city suburb where there were houses overlooking the venue. Some of the local residents in neighbouring streets would profit by turning their yards into makeshift car parks and charge speedway patrons to park there. Most of those whose home overlooked the speedway either watched the action for nothing from their rooftops or erected small grandstands for friends to also watch, something that those running the speedway never complained about. Not all local residents were fans of the speedway though as evidenced by the complaints to the local council. At one time Kym Bonython allegedly asked a lady whose house overlooked the Speedway if he could paint a sign promoting Rowley Park on the wall of her home which overlooked the speedway (and formed part of the fence of her property). Bonython was told in no uncertain terms that permission would not be granted.

== Australian championships ==
Rowley Park Speedway was the host venue for a number of Australian Championships in its 30-year history. These include:

- Australian Modified Sprintcar Championship – 1973
- Australian Speedcar Championship – 1975
- Australian Super Sedan Championship – 1976
- Australian Solo Championship – 1966, 1967, 1972
- Australian Sidecar Championship – 1952, 1959, 1960, 1964, 1973, 1978

Additionally, Rowley Park hosted the Australasian Final as part of the qualification for the Speedway World Championship (Solo's) in 1979. The Australasian Final saw riders from Australia and New Zealand and was won by Sydney rider Billy Sanders. In 1976, Rowley Park had hosted the Southern Zone Final as the Australian qualifying round of the inaugural Australasian Final. Phil Crump won the Southern Zone from Sydney riders John Langfield and Phil Herne with Adelaide's John Boulger finishing fourth. Boulger would go on to win the first ever Australasian Final at the Western Springs Stadium in Auckland, NZ a week later.

== Track announcers ==
Rowley Park had a number of track announcers during its 30-year history. Among those who lent their voices were Mel Cameron (father of long time Adelaide radio personality Grant Cameron), Noel O'Conner, Brian Lamprell, Warwick Prime and Jim Chamings. The final announcers at the speedway were David Sabine and media personality Rob Kelvin. Kelvin, who joined Adelaide television station NWS9 in 1979 and would go on to be Nine's Nightly News anchor from 1983 until his semi-retirement in late 2010. Sabine would also go on to commentate at the new Speedway Park when it opened, before retiring and being replaced by John Trenorden in the early 1980s.

== Today ==
Today the Kym Bonython Housing Estate sits on the site of the former Rowley Park Speedway. A raised plaque sits at the entrance to the estate depicting the Rowley Park Speedway logo. The plaque reads:

Placed by the S.A. speedway supporters, this plaque serves as a reminder that Rowley Park Speedway operated on this site for thirty years. Unveiled jointly by Kym Bonython A.C. D.F.C. A.F.C. and the Mayor of Hindmarsh, Florence Pens. 14 September 1991.

The plaque was removed after it was destroyed by vandals. It was replaced in 2014.

== Fatalities ==
Rowley Park Speedway operated in an era when safety was not the main concern of anyone involved. It wasn't until the early 1970s that safety roll cages for the open wheeled cars and seat belts became compulsory. Until the addition of the roll cage to the cars, Speedcar and TQ drivers, plus bike riders, were most at risk of serious injury or death. If a Speedcar or TQ rolled, the driver was at risk of death or serious injury as his or her head was usually well above the height of the rear roll bar. Also, until seat belts became compulsory in the 1970s, drivers often raced without a seat belt or nothing more than a lap sash, leading to drivers sometimes being thrown from their cars. It wasn't until the late 1960s that fireproof racing suits became compulsory. Before then, drivers often raced in overalls and some even raced in shorts and T-shirts. Bike riders were at risk of hitting the safety fence with no protection but a crash helmet and leathers (there were no Air Fences in those days), as well as being run over by closely following bikes (or in the case of a tumbling sidecar, having the bike land on a fallen rider).

This lack of safety unfortunately led to there being nine deaths at the speedway during its 30-year run. Those who lost their lives at Rowley Park are:

- Brian Bennett ( (Australia) ) – Sidecar (15 November 1957)
- Steve Howman ( (Australia) ) – Speedcar (2 January 1959)
- Arn Sunstrom ( (Australia) ) – Speedcar (23 January 1959)
- Gerry Hussey ( (England) ) – TQ (6 March 1959)
- Kon Lang ( (Australia) ) – TQ (9 November 1962)
- Peter Stirling ( (Australia) ) – Solo (17 December 1965)
- Harley Dillon ( (Australia) ) – Speedcar (25 February 1966)
- Harry Denton ( (Australia) ) – Solo (3 November 1967)
- Jimmy Gavros ( (Australia) ) – Solo (23 January 1970)

While all deaths at the speedway were tragic, the death of Gerry Hussey in a TQ (Three Quarter Midget) on 6 March 1959 was particularly so. Hussey, a popular English Solo star and member of many English test teams that rode in Australia during the late 1950s and placed 9th in the 1958 World Final at Wembley, fell in love with TQ racing and competed regularly at Rowley Park. He was due to sail back to England the day after his fatal crash to resume his British League solo career. Hussey was the only international visitor to lose his life competing at Rowley Park.

== Famous competitors ==
Some of the competitors who raced at Rowley Park Speedway between 1949 and 1979 include:

- Ian "Zeke" Agars ( (Australia) ) (Sprintcar)
- Jim Airey ( (Australia) ) (Solo)
- Grenville Anderson ( (Australia) ) (Saloon car) †
- Bill Barrows ( (Australia) ) (Sprintcar)
- Graham Benneche ( (Australia) ) (Saloon Car)
- Ivar Benneche ( (Australia) ) (Saloon Car)
- Kym Bonython ( (Australia) ) (Speedcar) †
- Eric Boocock ( (England) ) (Solo)
- Nigel Boocock ( (England) ) (Solo) †
- John Boulger ( (Australia) ) (Solo)
- Len Bowes ( (Australia) ) (Sidecar)
- Jack Brabham ( (Australia) ) (Speedcar) †
- Joe Braendler ( (Australia) ) (Speedcar) †
- Steve Brazier ( (Australia) ) (Sprintcar)
- Frank "Satan" Brewer* ( (New Zealand) / (United States) ) (Speedcar) †
- Dick Brown ( (United States) ) (Speedcar) †
- Peter Collins ( (England) ) (Solo)
- Peter Craven ( (England) ) (Solo) †
- John Crowhurst ( (Australia) ) (Saloon Car) †
- Phil Crump ( (Australia) ) (Solo)
- Jimmy Davies ( (United States) ) (Speedcar) †
- Johnny Fenton ( (Australia) ) (Speedcar)
- Ove Fundin ( (Sweden) ) (Solo)
- Gordon Guasco ( (Australia) ) (Solo) †
- Rick Harvey ( (Australia) ) (Speedcar) †
- Col Hennig ( (Australia) ) (Speedcar)
- Phil Herreen ( (Australia) ) (Speedcar/Sprintcar)
- Dean Hogarth ( (Australia) ) (Speedcar)
- Gerry Hussey ( (England) ) (Solo/TQ) †
- Ken I'Anson ( (Australia) ) (Sidecar)
- Gordon Kennett ( (England) ) (Solo)
- Bob Lane ( (Australia) ) (TQ/Speedcar) †
- Dud Lambert ( (Australia) ) (Speedcar) †
- Michael Lee ( (England) ) (Solo)
- Bob Leverenz ( (Australia) ) (Solo) †
- Ivan Mauger ( (New Zealand) ) (Solo) †
- Ken McKinlay ( (Scotland) ) (Solo) †
- Anders Michanek ( (Sweden) ) (Solo)
- Charlie Monk ( (Australia) ) (Solo) †
- Chris Morton ( (England) ) (Solo)
- John Moyle ( (Australia) ) (Super Modified/Sprintcar)
- Neil Munro ( (Australia) ) (Sidecar)
- Dennis Nash ( (Australia) ) (Sidecar)
- Harry Neale ( (Australia) ) (Speedcar) †
- Göte Nordin ( (Sweden) ) (Solo)
- Ole Olsen ( (Denmark) ) (solo)
- Tony Orlando ( (Australia) ) (Saloon Car)
- Brian Schultz ( (Australia) ) (Sidecar) †
- Jack Scott ( (Australia) ) (Solo) †
- Jim Silvy ( (Australia) ) (TQ/Speedcar) †
- Ray Revell ( (Australia) ) (Speedcar) †
- Garry Rush ( (Australia) ) (Super Modified/Sprintcar)
- Billy Sanders ( (Australia) ) (Solo) †
- Lou Sansom ( (Australia) ) (Solo)
- Marshall Sargent ( (United States) ) (Super Modified) †
- Rex Sendy ( (Australia) ) (Speedcar) †
- Alf Shields ( (Australia) ) (Speedcar) †
- Mitch Shirra ( (New Zealand) ) (Solo)
- Jimmy Sills ( (United States) ) (Sprintcar)
- Malcolm Simmons ( (England) ) (Solo) †
- Ray Skipper ( (Australia) ) (Super Modified)
- Rune Sörmander ( (Sweden) ) (Solo)
- George Tatnell ( (Australia) ) (Speedcar/Sprintcar) †
- Bob Tattersall ( (United States) ) (Speedcar) †
- Chum Taylor ( (Australia) ) (Solo)
- Deane Taylor ( (Australia) ) (Sidecar)
- Ron "Sleepy" Tripp ( (United States) ) (Speedcar)
- Bill Wigzell ( (Australia) ) (Solo/Speedcar/Super Modified/Sprintcar) †
- Jack Young ( (Australia) ) (Solo) †

† – Deceased
* Frank "Satan" Brewer was from New Zealand but Australian promoters billed him as being from the United States to bring in bigger crowds

== Track records in 1955–56 ==
- Solo (3 laps clutch start): 49- 4/5 secs – Jack Young ( (Australia) )
- Sidecar (3 laps clutch start): 56- 2/5 secs – Jim Davies ( (Australia) )
- Sidecar (4 laps clutch start): 75 secs – Don Willison ( (Australia) )
- Speedcar (4 laps rolling start): 1 min 10-1/5 secs – Joe Blow (Gordon Schubert) ( (Australia) )
- Speedcar (10 laps rolling start): 2 min 56-3/5 secs – Roy Sands ( (Australia) )
- Stockcar (20 laps rolling start): 7min 23-3/5 sec – Ted Fulgrabe ( (Australia) )

== Track records 1978–79 ==
Final Season

- Sprintcar (1 lap rolling start): 0:14.8 – Jimmy Sills ( (United States) ) / Steve Brazier ( (Australia) )
- Solo (3 laps clutch start): 0:45.6 – John Boulger ( (Australia) ) / Phil Crump ( (Australia) ) / Gordon Kennett ( (England) )
- Sidecar (3 laps clutch start): 0:50.1 – Leigh Wingard ( (Australia) ) / John Gertig ( (Australia) )
- Speedcar (6 laps rolling start): 1:33.8 – Phil Herreen ( (Australia) ) / Bill Wigzell ( (Australia) )
- Saloon Cars (8 laps rolling start): 2:08.5 – "Big Bad" John Crowhurst ( (Australia) ) / Tony Orlando ( (Australia) )
