= Kings Challenge =

The Kings Challenge is an annual dirt track racing meeting held in Australia for Sprintcars. The meeting is held at the 372 metres (407 yards) long Borderline Speedway in Mount Gambier, South Australia.

After the success of the 1995 Australian Sprintcar Championship at the speedway, the first Kings Challenge was held in 1995 and was won by Sydney-based driver Brooke Tatnell.

Traditionally run on the Friday night before the Grand Annual Sprintcar Classic at the Premier Speedway in Warrnambool (Victoria), the $10,000 to win event was moved to the Thursday night to accommodate the Classic's move to a 3-day event in 2014. With the Kings Challenge running prior to the Classic, the event attracts the best sprintcar drivers from Australia and the United States.

Brooke Tatnell (1995), Skip Jackson (1998), Danny Lasoski (2001) and Donny Schatz (2002) are the only drivers to have won the Kings Challenge / Sprintcar Classic double in the same year.

== Winners since 1995 ==
Year	Winner
1995	Brooke Tatnell (NSW)
1996	not held (rain)
1997	Gary Brazier (NSW)
1998	Skip Jackson (NSW)
1999	Phil Gressman (United States)
Year	Winner
2000	Donny Schatz (United States)
2001	Danny Lasoski (United States)
2002	Donny Schatz (United States)
2003	Donny Schatz (United States)
2004	Daryn Pittman (United States)
2005	Donny Schatz (United States)
2006	Robbie Farr (NSW)
2007	Daryn Pittman (United States)
2008	Robbie Farr (NSW)
2009	not held (rain)
Year	Winner
2010	Robbie Farr (NSW)
2011	James McFadden (Qld)
2012	Jason Johnson (United States)
2013	Robbie Farr (NSW)
2014	Steven Lines (SA)
2015	Kerry Madsen (NSW)*

- Kerry Madsen became a naturalised United States citizen and is officially an Iowa driver for World of Outlaws. Australian sprint car racing uses State of Origin, where he is listed as NSW in his entry.

== See also ==
- Australian Sprintcar Championship
- Grand Annual Sprintcar Classic
- World Series Sprintcars
