= Western Sydney International Dragway =

Race track in Sydney, Australia

Coordinates: 33°48′50″S 150°52′17″E

Sydney Dragway
- Location: Ferrer's Road, Eastern Creek, New South Wales, Australia
- Opened: February 2004; 22 years ago
- Former names: Western Sydney International Dragway
- Website: www.sydneydragway.com.au

Sydney Dragway, also known as WSID for its former name, Western Sydney International Dragway, is a quarter mile drag racing facility in Eastern Creek, New South Wales, Australia, adjacent to Sydney Motorsport Park and Sydney Speedway. The track supports quarter mile, eighth mile and 1000-foot racing.

The dragway was built for $30 million, and opened in February 2004. WSID is based on international specifications.

The drag strip runs from north to south, with covered spectator seating on the western side; and grass bank seating areas on the eastern side of the track. The return road runs along the western side, passing through a burnout pad located in front of the covered seating. Staging lanes are behind the control tower and office facilities, with racers driving under the tower to the starting line.

== Events ==
WSID hosts a large variety of events, ranging from international Top Fuel dragster meetings through to burnout events and Street Meets, where the public can bring their own cars to the track to race. Street Meets are held every Wednesday night, except on public holidays.

Sydney Dragway has operated under International Hot Rod Association (IHRA) sanctioning, Australian National Drag Racing Association (ANDRA) sanctioning and dual sanctioning at different times.

Also held at the dragway was Iqon, an inaugural Australian exclusive event by Q-Dance.
