= Murray Bridge Speedway =

Dirt track racing venue

It's Your Speedway, SA!
- Location: Kennett Road, Murray Bridge, South Australia
- Coordinates: 35°7′3″S 139°17′35″E
- Capacity: 8,000
- Owner: Murray Bridge Sporting Car Club and Motorcycle Club
- Operator: Made Too Go
- Broke ground: 1958
- Opened: 1958
- Former names: Riverview Speedway
- Major events: World Series Sprintcars, Ultimate Sprintcar Championship, Ultimate Pink Night, Australia Day Sprintcar Stampede, Bill Wigzell Battle of the Bridge, Australasian 50 Lap Speedcar Championship, Demo Derby World Record Attempt, 360 Sprintcar Allstars, Wingless Sprints 60 Lapper

Oval
- Surface: Dolomite and Clay
- Length: 0.223 miles (0.360 km)
- Race lap record: 0.10.787 (Ryan Jones, , 2011, 410 Sprintcar)

The Murray Machining & Sheds Murray Bridge Speedway (formerly Riverview Speedway) is a Dirt track racing venue that is located in the town of Murray Bridge, South Australia, only 66 km from Adelaide. Racing at the speedway generally takes place between September and April meetings held on Saturday nights. Racing has been held at the venue continuously since opening in 1958.

== History ==
Murray Bridge based car dealer, and known South Australian speedway identity Kevin Fischer, along with Les Schulz, a dry cleaner, started Riverview Speedway in 1958 on the relatively unpopulated eastern side of the Murray River. The track was cut into the side of a hill which provided spectators with an unimpeded view of the entire track.

The speedway itself has changed significantly over the years, gradually growing in size to cope with the speed of the cars. In 1977 the track was increased to 300 metres (330 yards). While the track was generally good, there were often complaints from the Super Sedan drivers that the tight nature of the track produced processional racing (also many believed they could not fully exploit the power of their cars on the short track). During the mid-late 1980s and through most of the 1990s this saw most of the top South Australian drivers based at Adelaide's 430 metres (470 yards) long Speedway Park rarely race at Murray Bridge. The surface of the track was crushed dolomite which suited both bikes and cars, though it wasn't uncommon to see smoke billowing from overheated car tyres in a 15 or 20 lap feature race, especially from the Hot Rods. Also during the 1980s, the small size of the track saw the sports most popular category Sprintcars not race at Riverview.

Riverview would remain a 300-metre track until 1999 when the Murray Bridge Sporting Car Club and Motorcycle Club decided that to compete successfully it needed a track long enough to attract Sprintcar and Speedcar racing, as well as one capable of top level sedan racing. In order to do this the track was lengthened and widened to its present 360 metres (390 yards) length with 6° of banking, and clay was added to the dolomite surface. Due to the location of the track, a massive amount of earthworks was needed to fill in what was a 15m drop beyond the back straight (western side) to allow for the addition of 60 metres worth of track. During this time the pit area (located outside of turns 3 & 4) was enlarged to be able to house more cars for the expected championship and high-profile meetings of the future.

Since its beginning, Riverview Speedway has run both bikes and cars during their meetings with the track being a regular stop for numerous Australian championships including Sprintcars (360 and 410), Speedcars, Super Sedans, Street Stocks, Modified Production (Modifieds), Hot Rods, Solos (Senior and Under-21), Sidecars and Formula 500's, as well as many South Australian State titles (the national Sprintcar, Speedcar and Super Sedan titles were not awarded to Murray Bridge until after 1999), and the World Series Sprintcars. Unfortunately due to the addition of clay to the track surface in 1999, Solos and Sidecars have been seen less and less at the speedway.

Until approximately 2007 Riverview also had a smaller, 130 metres (140 yards) junior track (also made of dolomite) for Under-16 speedway riders on its infield from the early 1980s. The riders were those who usually rode at Adelaide's Sidewinders Speedway, with meetings usually taking place before the main meeting started. The junior track was replaced by a concrete Burnout pad.

On 12 November 2011, Riverview Speedway hosted the 2011 World Sidecar Speedway Championship, the first time the track hosted a World Championship event. New South Wales based rider Darrin Treloar and his Murray Bridge-based passenger Jesse Headland won the World championship. Headland was the defending champion of the event having won the title as passenger to his father Mick Headland at the Brandon Stadium in Coventry, England, in 2010.

Outside of Speedway racing, Murray Bridge Speedway has attempted to set a new World Record for the most Demolition Cars entered in a single Demolition Derby event. Previous attempts include: 2018 (79 cars); 2019 (113 cars); 2021 (123 cars).

== Australian Championships ==
Since its opening in 1958, the Riverview Speedway has played host to numerous Australian Championships for both bikes and cars.

- Australian Formula 500 Championship - 1971, 1977, 1985, 1993, 2001, 2017
- Australian Solo Championship - 1988, 1998, 2001
- Australian Sidecar Championship - 1990, 1997, 2000, 2002, 2005
- Australian Under-21 Solo Championship - 1992
- Australian AMCA Nationals Championship - 2015
- Australian Junior Sedan Championship - 2005, 2011
- Australian Late Model Championship - 2018
- Australian Modified Sedan Championship - 1997, 2003, 2006, 2017
- Australian Modlites Championship - 2021
- Australian Super Sedan Championship - 2004, 2014
- Australian Sprintcar Championship - 2005, 2025
- Australian 360 Sprintcar Championship - 2006, 2008, 2009, 2010, 2011, 2012, 2014, 2022*
- Australian Street Stock Championship - 2008
- Australian Speedcar Championship - 2009, 2018, 2025*
- Australian V8 Dirt Modified Championship - 2003, 2007
- Australian Wingless Sprint Championship - 2022*

== Lap Records ==
as of April 2021

- 410 Sprintcars: 0.10.787 - Ryan Jones ( (South Australia) ), 22 October 2011
- 360 Sprintcars: 00.11.41 - Luke Dillon ( (South Australia) ), 8 November 2014
