= Australian Street Stock Championship =

The Australian Street Stock Championship is a Dirt track racing championship held each year to determine the Australian national champion. The championship is held over a single meeting (usually on consecutive nights) and has run annually since the 1989/90 season and is awarded to a different state of Australia each year by the national controlling body, the Australian Saloon Car Federation (ASCF).

As of 2013/14, the championship has not been held in either New South Wales or Queensland. The championship is generally run at country tracks and only twice (1992 and 2012) has it been held in a state capital city, that being the Northline Speedway in Darwin.

The first championship was run at the Premier Speedway in Warrnambool, Victoria and was won by Waikerie based South Australian driver Neil Hoffman.

The 2014/15 championship was held at the Kalgoorlie International Speedway in Kalgoorlie, Western Australia on 28 February and 1 March. South Australia's Anthony Beare won his 2nd national championship leading home former three time national champion Brad McClure of Victoria with another Victorian Mick Dann finishing third.

The 2015/16 championship will be held at the Redline Speedway in Ballarat, Victoria on 12–13 March 2006.

== Winners since 1989/90 ==
Year	Venue	City/State	Winner	Runner-up	3rd place
1989/90	Premier Speedway	Warrnambool, Vic	Neil Hoffman (SA)	Glen Watts (Vic)	Bob O'Rourke (SA)
Year	Venue	City/State	Winner	Runner-up	3rd place
1990/91	Esperance Speedway	Esperance, WA	Kevin Puls (WA)	Murray Penn (WA)	Wayne Thompson (WA)
1991/92	Northline Speedway	Darwin, NT	Darren Pickert (SA)	Wayne Cullenane (NT)	Graeme Moule (NT)
1992/93	Riverland Speedway	Renmark, SA	Neil Hoffman (SA)	Wayne Heinrich (SA)	Mark Jennings (SA)
1993/94	Latrobe Speedway	Latrobe, Tas	Todd Auton (Tas)	Paul Horman (Vic)	Shayne Waddington (Tas)
1994/95	Timmis Speedway	Mildura, Vic	Mark Jennings (SA)	Leanne Wella (SA)	Wayne Thompson (WA)
1995/96	Esperance Speedway	Esperance, WA	Brad Blake (WA)	Brian Jackson (WA)	Michael Holmes (WA)
1996/97	Arunga Park Speedway	Alice Springs, NT	David Gartner (SA)	N/A	N/A
1997/98	Borderline Speedway	Mount Gambier, SA	David Gartner (SA)	Matthew Neilson (SA)	Robert Gorman (Vic)
1998/99	Latrobe Speedway	Latrobe, Tas	Todd Auton (Tas)	Brad Kennedy (WA)	Barry Edwards (SA)
1999/2000	Redline Speedway	Ballarat, Vic	Daniel Barton (Vic)	Peter Lincoln (Vic)	Mick Dann (Vic)
Year	Venue	City/State	Winner	Runner-up	3rd place
2000/01	Collie Speedway	Collie, WA	Barry Edwards (SA)	Mick Dann (Vic)	Wayne Thomson (WA)
2001/02	Arunga Park Speedway	Alice Springs, NT	Mathew Neilson (SA)	Jason Duell (SA)	Andrew Cox (SA)
2002/03	Borderline Speedway	Mount Gambier, SA	Steven Lines (SA)	Jamie Jennings (SA)	Mathew Neilson (SA)
2003/04	Latrobe Speedway	Latrobe, Tas	Todd Auton (Tas)	Steven Lines (SA)	Greg Lynd (Tas)
2004/05	Bunbury Speedway	Bunbury, WA	Jamie Oldfield (WA)	Jason Oldfield (WA)	Warren Oldfield (WA)
2005/06	Timmis Speedway	Mildura, Vic	Brad McClure (Vic)	Scott Bull (Vic)	Anthony Beare (SA)
2006/07	Arunga Park Speedway	Alice Springs, NT	Anthony Beare (SA)	Jeremy Weston (SA)	Donald Irving (Vic)
2007/08	Riverview Speedway	Murray Bridge, SA	Michael Hamon (WA)	Troy Neilson (Vic)	Matt Amato (WA)
2008/09	Carrick Speedway	Carrick, Tas	Brad McClure (Vic)	Mick Dann (Vic)	Troy Russell (Tas)
2009/10	Ellenbrook Speedway	Ellenbrook, WA	Jamie Oldfield WA)	Troy Neilson (Vic)	Damien Amato (WA)
Year	Venue	City/State	Winner	Runner-up	3rd place
2010/11	Timmis Speedway	Mildura, Vic	Brad McClure (Vic)	Michael Clarke	Robert Wakefield (WA)
2011/12	Northline Speedway	Darwin, NT	Michael Hamon (WA)	Mick Dann (Vic)	Steven Gartner (SA)
2012/13	Borderline Speedway	Mount Gambier, SA	Robbie Faux (Vic)	Anthony Beare (SA)	Jason Duell (SA)
2013/14	Carrick Speedway	Carrick, Tas	Robbie Faux (Vic)	Michael Clarke (Vic)	Matt Templar (Tas)
2014/15	Kalgoorlie International Speedway	Kalgoorlie, WA	Anthony Beare (SA)	Brad McClure (Vic)	Mick Dann (Vic)

== See also ==
- Motorsport in Australia
- List of Australian motor racing series
