= Australian Super Sedan Championship =

The Australian Super Sedan Championship is a Dirt track racing championship held each year to determine the Australian national champion. The championship is held over a single meeting (usually on consecutive nights) and has run annually since the 1971/72 season and is awarded to a different state of Australia each year by the national controlling body, Speedway Sedans Australia (SSA).

The first championship was run in Australia's capital city of Canberra at the now closed Fraser Park Speedway (later renamed Tralee Speedway) and was won by Kevin Dalton of Victoria.

The championship is separate to the National Super Sedan Series which ran from 2006 until 2015.

Tasmanian born driver Darren Kane holds the record for the most titles with five to his name. Winning his most recent title in the 2023/24 season in Albany, WA

New South Wales driver Grenville Anderson (1951–2004), has four titles to his name – 1975/76 (Rowley Park Speedway in Adelaide, South Australia), 1977/78 (Claremont Speedway in Perth, Western Australia), 1979/80 (Bagot Park in Darwin, Northern Territory), and 1992/93 (Latrobe Speedway in Latrobe, Tasmania). Anderson also finished second in 1978/79 at the Charlton Speedway in Toowoomba, Queensland, and was easily the quickest driver at the 1991/92 championship at Speedway Park in Adelaide, not losing a race until a crash in his final heat saw his car severely damaged. Born in 1951, Anderson died in 2004 as a result of head injuries he sustained during a crash when running hot laps at Brisbane's Archerfield Speedway before the first night of the 1993/94 Australian Championships where he was the defending champion.

Queenslander Matty Pascoe also has four titles to his name

The current (2024/25) Australian Super Sedan champion is Joel Berkley who won his first crown at Murray bridge, SA on the 16th of March 2025.

== Winners since 1971 ==
Year	Venue	City/State	Winner	Runner-up	3rd place
1971/72	Tralee Speedway	Canberra, ACT	Kevin Dalton (VIC)	Alan Butcher (QLD)	David House (NSW)
1972/73	Liverpool Speedway	Sydney, NSW	David House (NSW)	Peter Crick (NSW)	Paul Ash (NSW)
1973/74	Northern Park	Melbourne, Vic	David Wignall (NSW)	Russell Hoffman (QLD)	David House (NSW)
1974/75	Charlton Raceway	Toowoomba, Qld	David House (NSW)	Kevin Drew (QLD)	Neville Harper (TAS)
1975/76	Rowley Park Speedway	Adelaide, SA	Grenville Anderson (NSW)	Peter Timberlake (Vic)	David House (NSW)
1976/77	Carrick Speedway	Carrick, Tas	Allan Blake (WA)	Merv Hargreaves (QLD)	Howie Fiedler (QLD)
1977/78	Claremont Speedway	Perth, WA	Grenville Anderson (NSW)	Frank Ashmore (VIC)	Ben Ludlow (WA)
1978/79	Charlton Raceway	Toowoomba, QLD	Russell Hoffman (QLD)	Grenville Anderson (NSW)	Phil Marshall (QLD)
1979/80	Bagot Park	Darwin, NT	Grenville Anderson (NSW)	Nev Pezutti (NSW)	Daran Munro (QLD)
Year	Venue	City/State	Winner	Runner-up	3rd place
1980/81	Newcastle Motordrome	Newcastle, NSW	Alan Butcher (QLD)	Adrian Anderson (NSW)	John Leslight (NSW)
1981/82	Melbourne Speedbowl	Melbourne, VIC	John Cartwright (NSW)	Cees Hendriks (TAS)	John Leslight (NSW)
1982/83**	Avalon Raceway; Premier Speedway; Speedway Park	Lara, Vic; Warrnambool, Vic; Virginia, SA	Cees Hendriks (TAS)	Graham Lilford (NSW)	Chas Kelly (TAS)
1983/84#	Speedway Park	Virginia, SA	Chris Blunden (SA)	Steve Stewart (SA)	Gary Chippendall (VIC)
1984/85	Melbourne Speedbowl	Melbourne, VIC	Tony Grinstead (VIC)	Peter Timberlake (VIC)	Gary Chippendall (VIC)
1985/86	Speedway Park	Virginia, SA	Peter Aylett (TAS)	Mark Weaver (VIC)	Kym Cottrell (SA)
1986/87	Hobart Speedway	New Norfolk, TAS	Michael Long (TAS)	Peter Aylett (TAS)	Gary Reuter (SA)
1987/88	Archerfield Speedway	Brisbane, QLD	Ian Marshall (QLD)	John Pyne (NSW)	Tony Broso (NSW)
1988/89	Claremont Speedway	Perth, WA	John Singleton (WA)	Peter Brook (WA)	Peter Drew (SA)
1989/90	Newcastle Motordrome	Newcastle, NSW	John Pyne (NSW)	Peter Garratt (NSW)	Stu Robertson (NSW)
Year	Venue	City/State	Winner	Runner-up	3rd place
1990/91	Bendigo Raceway	Bendigo, VIC	Tony Grinstead (VIC)	Wayne Randall (QLD)	Nick Girdlestone (QLD)
1991/92	Speedway Park	Virginia, SA	Brad Scotcher (SA)	John Leslight (NSW)	Allan Baker (NSW)
1992/93	Latrobe Speedway	Latrobe, TAS	Grenville Anderson (NSW)	Allan Baker (NSW)	Ron Pyne (NSW)
1993/94	Archerfield Speedway	Brisbane, QLD	John McGeorge (QLD)	Ron Pyne (NSW)	John Pyne (NSW)
1994/95	Claremont Speedway	Perth, WA	Ron Pyne (NSW)	John Leslight (NSW)	Ian Marshall (QLD)
1995/96	Newcastle Motordrome	Newcastle, NSW	John Pyne (NSW)	Steve Francis ( (United States) )	Stuart Robertson (NSW)
1996/97	Northline Speedway	Darwin, NT	Peter Logue (VIC)	John Pyne (NSW)	Robert Gray (WA)
1997/98	Premier Speedway	Warrnambool, VIC	Mick Nicola SNR (VIC)	Allan Baker (NSW)	Peter Logue (VIC)
1998/99	Borderline Speedway	Mount Gambier, SA	Ron Pyne (NSW)	Darren Kane (QLD)	Mick Nicola SNR (VIC)
1999/2000	Hobart Speedway	New Norfolk, TAS	Ron Pyne (NSW)	Darren Kane (QLD)	Bill Miller (SA)
Year	Venue	City/State	Winner	Runner-up	3rd place
2000/01	Rockhampton Speedway	Rockhampton, QLD	Peter Logue (VIC)	Allan Baker (NSW)	John Pyne (NSW)
2001/02	Attwell Park Speedway	Albany, WA	Mick Nicola SNR(VIC)	Peter Logue (VIC)	Jamie McHugh (QLD)
2002/03	Parramatta City Raceway	Sydney, NSW	Mick Nicola SNR (VIC)	John Leslight (NSW)	Wayne Brims (NSW)
2003/04	Riverview Speedway	Murray Bridge, SA	Darren Kane (QLD)	Jarrod Harper (TAS)	David Nichols (TAS)
2004/05	Latrobe Speedway	Latrobe, TAS	Kevin Purton (TAS)	Mick Nicola SNR (VIC)	Jarrod Harper (TAS)
2005/06	Charlton Raceway	Toowoomba, QLD	Kevin Purton (TAS)	John Leslight (NSW)	Lucas Roberts (VIC)
2006/07	Perth Motorplex	Kwinana Beach, WA	Michael Gee (QLD)	Marc Giancola (WA)	Wayne Randall (QLD)
2007/08	Timmis Speedway	Mildura, VIC	Jamie McHugh (QLD)	Steve Jordan (QLD)	Jarrod Harper (TAS)
2008/09	Lismore Speedway	Lismore, NSW	Darren Kane (QLD)	Wayne Brims (NSW)	Brad Smith (TAS)
2009/10	Speedway City	Virginia, SA	Jamie McHugh (QLD)	Dave Gartner (SA)	Wayne Randall (QLD)
Year	Venue	City/State	Winner	Runner-up	3rd place
2010/11	Latrobe Speedway	Latrobe, TAS	Steve Jordan (QLD)	Jamie McHugh (QLD)	Darren Kane (QLD)
2011/12	Brisbane International Speedway	Brisbane, QLD	Jarrod Harper (TAS)	Lachlan Onley (NSW)	Matty Pascoe (QLD)
2012/13	Perth Motorplex	Kwinana Beach, WA	Matty Pascoe (QLD)	Lachlan Onley (NSW)	Jamie Oldfield (WA)
2013/14	Riverview Speedway	Murray Bridge, SA	Kodee Brown (WA)	Lachlan Onley (NSW)	Darren Kane (QLD)
2014/15	Latrobe Speedway	Latrobe, TAS	Matty Pascoe (QLD)	Kodee Brown (WA)	Darren Kane (QLD)
2015/16	Rockhampton Speedway	Rockhampton, QLD	Callum Harper (TAS)	Dave Gartner (SA)	Darren Kane (QLD)
2016/17	Attwell Park	Albany, WA	Darren Kane (QLD)	Dave Gartner (SA)	Matty Pascoe (QLD)
2017/18	Parramatta City Raceway	Sydney, NSW	Callum Harper (TAS)	Matty Pascoe (QLD)	Darren Kane (QLD)
2018/19	Heartland Raceway	Moama, NSW	Matty Pascoe (QLD)	Ryan Alexander (SA)	Callum Harper (TAS)
Year	Venue	City/State	Winner	Runner-up	3rd place
2019/20	Borderline Raceway	Glenburnie, SA	Darren Kane (QLD)	Ryan Alexander (SA)	Matty Pascoe (QLD)
2020/21	Not Run Due to Covid				
2021/22	Gulf Western & Independent Oils Raceway	Latrobe, TAS	Matty Pascoe (QLD)	Matt Williams (QLD)	Callum Harper (TAS)
2022/23	Mothar Mountain Raceway	Gympie, Qld	Trent Wilson (QLD)	Justin Randall (QLD)	Matt Williams (QLD)
2023/24	Attwell Park Speedway	Albany, WA	Darren Kane (QLD)	Dustin Higgs (WA)	Dave Gartner (SA)
2024/25	Murray Bridge Speedway	Murray Bridge, SA	Joel Berkley(QLD)	Mick Nicola JNR (VIC)	Dylan Barrow (VIC)

** 1982-83 Championship was run over 3 rounds with an overall winner, runner up and 3rd place decided on points
## 1983-84 The name was changed from National Super Sedan – Open Division to Super Sedans

== See also ==
- Motorsport in Australia
