= Eastern Creek, New South Wales =

Eastern Creek
- Suburb
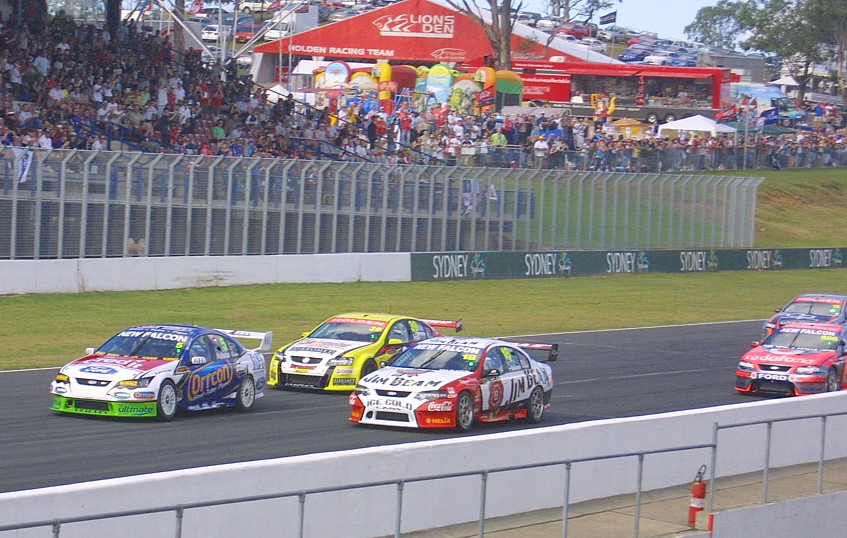
- Car racing at Sydney Motorsport Park, Eastern Creek

- Interactive map of Eastern Creek
- Country: Australia
- State: New South Wales
- City: Sydney
- LGA: City of Blacktown
- Location: 39 km (24 mi) west of Sydney CBD

Government
  - State electorates: Badgerys Creek; Mount Druitt; Prospect
  - Federal division: McMahon
- Elevation: 46 m (151 ft)

Population
  - Total: 874 (2021 census)
- Postcode: 2766
Suburbs around Eastern Creek
Rooty Hill	Doonside	Arndell Park
Minchinbury Erskine Park	Eastern Creek	Huntingwood
Kemps Creek	Horsley Park	Prospect

Eastern Creek is a suburb of Sydney, in the state of New South Wales, Australia. Eastern Creek is located 39 kilometres (24 mi) west of the Sydney central business district, in the Blacktown local government area and is part of the Greater Western Sydney region.

Eastern Creek is west of the Prospect Reservoir and is most notable for containing Sydney Motorsport Park (previously known as Eastern Creek Raceway), the Western Sydney International Dragway, and the former site of Wonderland Sydney amusement park.

== History ==
The origin of the suburb's name lies in the fact the eastern branch of South Creek became known as Eastern Creek. The village that then grew where the road crossed the creek became known as Eastern Creek.

== Population ==
In the 2021 Census, there were 874 people in Eastern Creek. 60.1% of people were born in Australia and 56.6% of people spoke only English at home. The most common responses for religion were Catholic 27.2% and No Religion 20.7%.

== Commercial areas ==
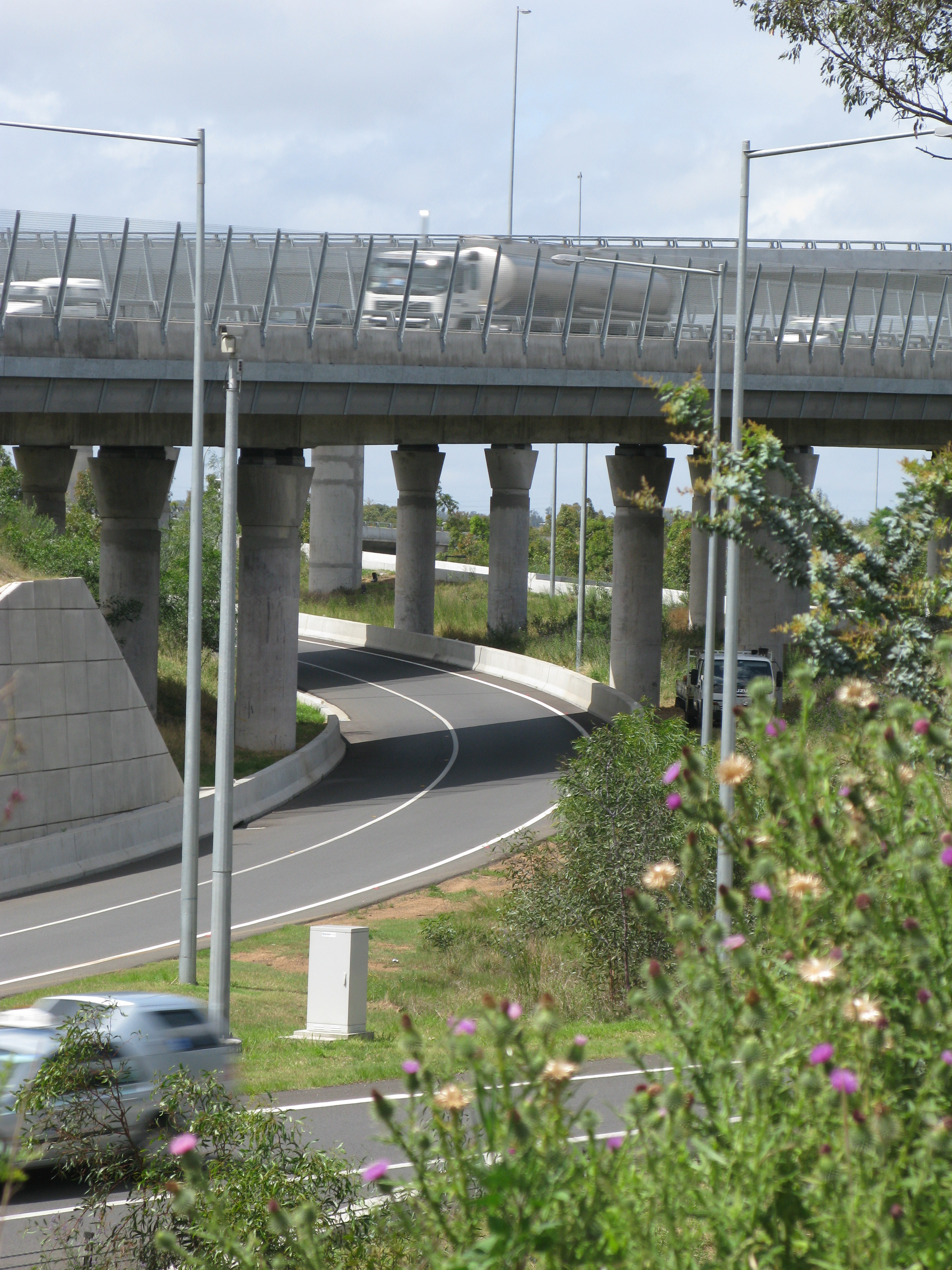
Light Horse Interchange

Eastern Creek features many industrial developments and often the description 'Eastern Creek Area' also includes the industrial developments in the neighbouring suburbs of Arndell Park and Huntingwood. With this in mind most statistics and demographic information is not available for this suburb by itself. The Eastern Creek Resource Recovery Park (waste management centre) and Recycling Centre also takes up a large part of the suburb. The Eastern Creek Resource Recovery Park is one of Greater Sydney's principal non-putrescible landfills, whereas the Lucas Heights Resource Recovery Park is Sydney's only remaining putrescible landfill.

== Recreation ==
Sydney Motorsport Park has hosted V8 Supercars events and hosted the Top Gear Festival on 8 and 9 March 2014. The Western Sydney International Dragway is located next to it.

Wonderland Sydney was a large amusement park that operated here between 1985 and 2004. Wonderland is now the site of a business park called Interchange Park.

The Western Sydney Parklands lies to the west of the suburb. Prospect Nature Reserve is situated to the east of the suburb, which provides recreational needs.

A new outlet shopping center in the northern residential portion of the suburb, named DFO Eastern Creek, (Note: Formerly known as Eastern Creek Quarter (ECQ Outlet)) first opened in June 2020, receiving multiple expansion projects and eventually a large outlet revision. The shopping centre houses a wide variety of restaurants, fashion brands, and entertainment facilities. Vicinity Centres acquired ownership of the then-ECQ Outlet for $351 million AUD and rebranded it as a part of the Direct Factory Outlet (DFO) shopping centre brand.
