= World Series Sprintcars =

Australian car racing series

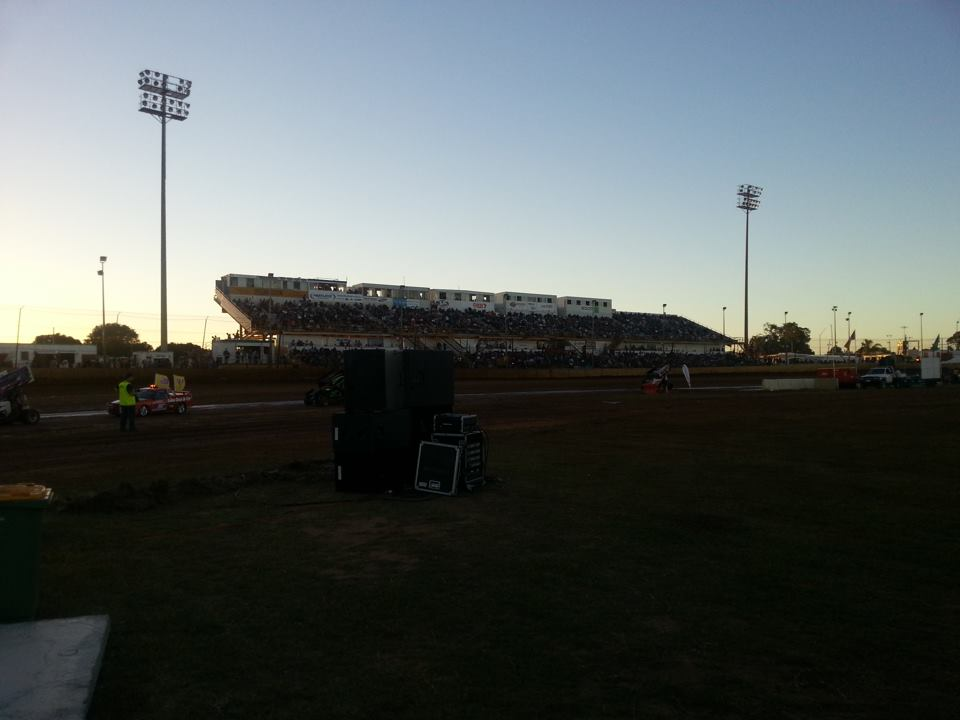
Bunbury Speedway during the 2013-14 series

World Series Sprintcars was a dirt track racing series held in Australia for Sprintcars. It was the richest and best known Speedway series in Australia. The series was last run in 2019/20 summer season. The COVID-19 pandemic was the originally cited reason for the series cancellation. Multiple attempts to restart the series have failed. The series has been replaced by multiple Sprintcar State Series.

== History ==
The series was conceived by Adelaide based sedan driver and promoter John Hughes in 1986 as an Australian version of the famous World of Outlaws (WoO) series run in the United States since 1978. The WSS is separate from the single meeting Australian Sprintcar Championship and is currently run over 12 rounds during the Australian Speedway season. The championship is open to drivers of any nationality, and is usually held from December until February. As it is held during the North American off-season, many visiting stars from North America will make visits, some even racing the majority of races before the North American season begins.

The first ever World Series Sprintcars (WSS) meeting was held in Perth at the now defunct Claremont Speedway on 1 December 1987. Originally each meeting was held on a single night, though for the past number of years each meeting is run over two nights, with Time Trials, heat races and a Preliminary B then A main on the first night with more heats, three qualifying Top eight shootout races (a three-round knockout—first round 5th-8th take another round of time trials, with the top two advancing, second round elimination race features 3rd and 4th facing the two advancing from the first round, again with the top two advancing, and the run for the pole featuring the two fastest facing the two that advanced in the second round); the format is different from the Dash format used by the Outlaws where the 8-10 fastest participating in a short race to determine the pole), the C Main, B Main and then the A Main (final) in a format similar to most sprintcar races.

Speedway City in Adelaide has held the most WSS rounds with over 55. The Archerfield Speedway in Brisbane is second on the list with 50 rounds hosted.

Like the Australian Sprintcar Championship, the WSS has been dominated by drivers from New South Wales. Of the 26 series held since 1987, 16 drivers from NSW have won. Victorian driver Max Dumesny with seven series titles, foreign driver Darryn Pitman (Oklahoma, United States) with one win, 2011–12 champion James McFadden from Queensland (born in the Northern Territory), and 2013–14 champion Steven Lines from South Australia are the only non-NSW drivers to win the title. Although Dumesny is originally from Victoria, he has been based in Sydney since the mid-1990s. Darryn Pitman's win in 2002/03 is the only title by a foreign driver and the only time anyone other than an Australian has won the series title (the North American World of Outlaws season-opening meet in Barberville, Florida, USA will sometimes conflict with the final race of this series).

Sydney driver Brooke Tatnell has won a record eight series since first contesting races in the inaugural series run in 1987. Brooke is also part of the only father and son combination to ever win the series with his father, former national Speedcar and Sprintcar champion George Tatnell, winning the first two series run in 1987/88 and 1988/89. George Tatnell also finished second in 1989/90, the year Dumesny won his first series.

Visiting American drivers who have been or are regular competitors in World Series Sprintcars include Jack Hewitt, Danny Smith, Joey Saldana, Darryn Pitman, Donny Schatz, Jason Johnson and Shane Stewart. Others who have competed in select races while touring Australia include Sprintcar racings "King" Steve Kinser, his younger brother Randy Kinser and Tim Green.

The 2013–14 World Series Sprintcars is sponsored by New Zealand based hydraulic hose and lubricant company Enzed. The series started on 26 December 2013 at Speedway City in Adelaide, and finished with the Grand Final on 22 February 2014 at the Perth Motorplex. Steven Lines from Mount Gambier in South Australia won his first ever World Series Sprintcars championship.

The 2014-15 World Series Sprintcars is set to start at Speedway City on 24 December 2014, with the 13th and final round on 21 February 2015 at the Perth Motorplex.

== Winners since 1987 ==
Year	Winner	Runner-up	3rd place
1987–88	George Tatnell (QLD)	Brett Lacey (Vic)	Garry Rush (NSW)
1988–89	George Tatnell (NSW)	Max Dumesny (Vic)	Brett Lacey (Vic)
1989–90	Max Dumesny (Vic)	George Tatnell (NSW)	Garry Rush (NSW)
1990–91	Max Dumesny (Vic)	Jack Hewitt ( (United States) )	Danny Smith ( (United States) )
1991–92	Brad Heywood (NSW)	Max Dumesny (Vic)	Jack Hewitt ( (United States) )
1992–93	Max Dumesny (Vic)	Garry Brazier (NSW)	David Anderson (Vic)
1993–94	Garry Brazier (NSW)	Brooke Tatnell (NSW)	Garry Rush (NSW)
1994–95	Brooke Tatnell (NSW)	Danny Smith ( (United States) )	Garry Rush (NSW)
1995–96	Brooke Tatnell (NSW)	Joey Saldana ( (United States) )	Peter Murphy (NSW)
1996–97	Skip Jackson (NSW)	Brooke Tatnell (NSW)	Danny Smith ( (United States) )
1997–98	Skip Jackson (NSW)	Brooke Tatnell (NSW)	Trevor Green (SA)
1998–99	Skip Jackson (NSW)	Randy Hannagan ( (United States) )	Garry Brazier (NSW)
1999–00	Brooke Tatnell (NSW)	Donny Schatz ( (United States) )	Skip Jackson (NSW)
2000–01	Brooke Tatnell (NSW)	Max Dumesny (Vic)	Skip Jackson (NSW)
2001–02	Max Dumesny (Vic)	Donny Schatz ( (United States) )	Bradley Furr ( (United States) )
2002–03	Daryn Pittman ( (United States) )	Robbie Farr (NSW)	Max Dumesny (Vic)
2003–04	Max Dumesny (Vic)	Jason Johnson ( (United States) )	Brooke Tatnell (NSW)
2004–05	Max Dumesny (Vic)	Robbie Farr (NSW)	Shane Stewart ( (United States) )
2005–06	Brooke Tatnell (NSW)	Max Dumesny (Vic)	Jason Johnson ( (United States) )
2006–07	Max Dumesny (Vic)	Jason Johnson ( (United States) )	David Murcott (Tas)
2007–08	Brooke Tatnell (NSW)	Robbie Farr (NSW)	Max Dumesny (Vic)
2008–09	Brooke Tatnell (NSW)	Robbie Farr (NSW)	Max Dumesny (Vic)
2009–10	Brooke Tatnell (NSW)	Robbie Farr (NSW)	Max Dumesny (Vic)
2010–11	Robbie Farr (NSW)	David Murcott (Tas)	Jason Johnson ( (United States) )
2011–12	James McFadden (Qld)	Brooke Tatnell (NSW)	Jason Johnson ( (United States) )
2012–13	James McFadden (Qld)	Shane Stewart ( (United States) )	Steven Lines (SA)
2013–14	Steven Lines (SA)	Brooke Tatnell (NSW)	James McFadden (Qld)
2014–15	Brooke Tatnell (NSW)	David Murcott (Tas)	James McFadden (Qld)
2015–16	Jamie Veal (VIC)	Brooke Tatnell (NSW)	Steven Lines (SA)
2016–17	James McFadden (VIC)	Jamie Veal (VIC)	Brooke Tatnell (NSW)
2017–18	James McFadden (VIC)	Jamie Veal (VIC)	Carson Macedo ( (United States) )
2018–19	Steves Lines (SA)	Kerry Madsen (NSW)	James McFadden (VIC)
2019–20	James McFadden (VIC)	Kerry Madsen (NSW)	Brooke Tatnell (NSW)
2020-21	Not held due to COVID-19 Pandemic in Australia		
2021-22	Not held due to COVID-19 Pandemic in Australia		

=== Total championships ===
	Driver	Titles	Seasons
1	(Australia) Brooke Tatnell	9	1995, 1996, 2000, 2001, 2006, 2008, 2009, 2010, 2015
2	(Australia) Max Dumesny	7	1990, 1991, 1993, 2002, 2004, 2005, 2007
3	(Australia) James McFadden	5	2012, 2013, 2017, 2018, 2020
4	(Australia) Skip Jackson	3	1997, 1998, 1999
5	(Australia) Steven Lines	2	2014, 2019
5	(Australia) George Tatnell	2	1988, 1989
7	(Australia) Jamie Veal	1	2016
7	(Australia) Robbie Farr	1	2011
7	(United States) Daryn Pittman	1	2003
7	(Australia) Garry Brazier	1	1994
7	(Australia) Brad Heywood	1	1992

== 2022-23 schedule ==
Rnd	Date	Circuit	City	State	Winner
South Australia and Victoria Series
1	26 December 2022	Murray Bridge Speedway	Murray Bridge	South Australia	
2	28 December 2022	Borderline Speedway	Glenburnie	South Australia	
3	30 December 2022	Avalon Raceway	Lara	(Victoria (state)) Victoria	
4	1 January 2023	Premier Speedway	Allansford	(Victoria (state)) Victoria	
Western Australia Series
1	26 December 2022	Perth Motorplex	Kwinana Beach	Western Australia	
2	28 December 2022	Perth Motorplex	Kwinana Beach	Western Australia	
3	1 January 2023	Bunbury Speedway	Bunbury	Western Australia	
4	2 January 2023	Perth Motorplex	Kwinana Beach	Western Australia	
5	7 January 2023	Ellenbrook Speedway	Bullsbrook	Western Australia	
6	14 January 2023	Bunbury Speedway	Bunbury	Western Australia	
7	21 January 2023	Perth Motorplex	Kwinana Beach	Western Australia	
New South Wales and Queensland Series
1	4 January 2023	Eastern Creek Speedway	Eastern Creek	New South Wales	
2	6–7 January 2023	Eastern Creek Speedway	Eastern Creek	New South Wales	
3	11 January 2023	Archerfield Speedway	Acacia Ridge	Queensland	
4	13–14 January 2023	Archerfield Speedway	Acacia Ridge	Queensland	
5	17 January 2023	Lismore Speedway	Lismore	New South Wales	
6	20–21 January 2023	Toowoomba Speedway	Toowoomba	Queensland	

== Rules and regulations ==
The Australian Speedway Rules and Regulations book is full of rules that Sprintcar drivers, teams, owners, vehicles and venues must abide by. There are eight sections of rules and regulations (not including the forms and guidelines) in the book, and they are listed below:

- Part 1, Administrative and general requirements.

- Part 2, Pre Race requirements.

- Part 3, Technical.

- Part 4, Race procedures.

- Part 5, Officials and their duties.

- Part 6, Drugs and alcohol.

- Part 7, Behavior, fines, penalties and protests.

- Part 8, Judicial procedures.

For the more specific details of the rules and regulations, the full book can be found and downloaded here

== See also ==
- Sport in Australia
