= Adelaide Motorsport Park =

Dirt track racing venue in South Australia

Speedway City
The Greatest Show on Dirt
- Location: Supple Road, Virginia, South Australia
- Coordinates: 34°41′50″S 138°33′33″E
- Capacity: 10,000
- Operator: Owned by and Operated by Bob Sincock with Wendy Turner as Manager.
- Broke ground: 1978
- Opened: 2 November 1979
- Former names: Speedway Park (1979–1996); Speedway City (1997–2016)
- Major events: World Series Sprintcars; Australian Sprintcar Championship; Australian Sprintcar Masters; Australian Speedcar Championship; Australian Super Sedan Championship; Australian Solo Championship; Australian Sidecar Championship; National Super Sedan Series; Speedcar Pro Series

Oval
- Surface: Clay
- Length: 0.267 mi (0.430 km)
- Race lap record: 0:11.60 (Matt Egel, Muir Motorsport, 2015, 410 Sprintcar)

The Adelaide Motorsport Park, known as Speedway Park from 1979 to 2001 and Speedway City from 1997 to 2016, is a dirt track racing venue located 26 km north of Adelaide in Virginia, South Australia, adjacent to the Adelaide International Raceway.

== History ==
Speedway Park came about due to the closure of Rowley Park Speedway following the 1978/79 speedway season. Rowley Park had run in the Adelaide suburb of Brompton since 1949 but had closed for such reasons as the track becoming too small for the faster cars appearing on the scene, and the local residents complaining about the noise; while the speedway was located less than 5 km from the Adelaide city centre, parking was mostly street-based, which brought more complaints from residents.

The land for the new speedway was located 26 km north of Adelaide near the town of Virginia which from 1969 to 1974 had hosted speedway at the local showgrounds called Thunderbird Speedway, while the neighbouring Adelaide International Raceway as part of its 2.41 km road racing circuit had an 805 metres (880 yards) paved oval, which had also been used for speedway during the mid-1970s. Speedway Park's new neighbours were and still are market garden's which meant noise complaints were non-existent while ample on-site parking also did away with parking restrictions. Unfortunately though, the new location so far north of Adelaide severely contrasted with the old Rowley Park site which was centrally located and was readily accessible by public transport, something that Speedway City can not offer. Though for a number of years this was barely a factor as the new track was well patronised.

The Speedway Park track itself is a 430 metres (470 yards) long clay surfaced oval track with a width of 16 metres (17 yards) and a camber of 1.2 metres. The track is surrounded by a 6'0" high concrete retaining wall with another 3 metres of catch fencing located on top of the wall. Beyond the track fence is a 3.5-metre safety zone surrounded by a 1 metre high chain mesh safety fence. Spectators are not permitted beyond the smaller fence, although when an accident on track occurs and a red flag is shown it is not uncommon to see kids at the catch fence to get a closer look at the crashed car. The venue has the capacity to hold more than 10,000 spectators and this has been pushed to the limit on numerous occasions.

The speedway was originally run and promoted by the Racing Drivers Association of South Australia and after a lot of hard work, the track held its first official meeting on 2 November 1979. Its opening meeting saw the track officially opened by the Minister for Transport, Recreation & Sport, the Hon. Michael M. Wilson MP. Unlike Rowley Park which had a dolomite surface, Speedway City has a clay surface which specifically suited the car racing categories such as Sprintcars, Speedcars and Super Sedans with their wide racing tyres, but was not so popular with the Solo and Sidecar riders who felt the sticky clay track and the solid concrete retaining wall made racing more dangerous than it needed to be. This often led to criticism that even for championship bike meetings the surface was prepared more for the supporting car events than it was for the bikes. 1985 was the last year that the bikes ran regularly at the speedway, although the sidecars did make a few appearances during the 1990s. From 1985 the bikes raced at the motorcycle only North Arm Speedway (opened in 1981) located in the industrial suburb of Gillman.

During the mid-1980s the RDA sold the promoting rights to MJS Promotions, run by Mike Powell and John Hughes, then a local Grand National sedan competitor and in 1987 the founder of the World Series Sprintcars. Under MJS the speedway was then managed by Malcolm Cribb, it became known as Winfield Speedway Park due to a naming rights deal with cigarette manufacturer Winfield. This saw the speedway join other venues around Australia with track sponsorship from Winfield including Perth's Claremont Speedway, Sydney's Liverpool City Raceway and the Motordrome in Newcastle.

On 1 November 1985 Speedway Park held the first ever Australian Sprintcar Masters to coincide with the running of the first ever Australian Formula One Grand Prix being run on the then new Adelaide Street Circuit. The Masters was won by World of Outlaws driver Randy Kinser of the United States in his JPS-sponsored Gambler Sprintcar from local favourite Bill Barrows. Kinser was in Australia in 1985/86 as part of JPS Team Kinser which consisted of older brother Steve Kinser and cousins Mark and Kelly, with another cousin, Karl, being the crew chief. During the Sprintcar Masters a couple of the visiting Formula One drivers including Renault drivers Derek Warwick and Patrick Tambay were given the chance to do a few 'hot laps' in one of the sprintcars. The governing body of Formula One, the Paris-based FIA, was not impressed, and Warwick received a hefty fine for his laps. Tambay escaped sanction as he had done his laps on the Friday night while Warwick did his laps before the start of Saturday nights action. This actually broke FIA regulations which did not allow a Formula One driver to drive another race car within 24 hours of the start of a Grands Prix without written permission. Among other visitors was triple World Drivers' Champion Jackie Stewart, who reportedly described Sprintcar racing as the "Most exciting form of motorsport in the world".

The speedway has held numerous Australian championships, starting with the Australian Sprintcar Championship in its opening 1979 season which was won by Sydney based driver Steve Brazier. Other titles held at the speedway include the Australian Speedcar Championship, the Australian Super Sedan Championship. The speedway also held the Australian Sidecar Championship in 1982, and in 1983 the venue held the Australian Solo Championship where winner Billy Sanders from Sydney famously told the unruly crowd to "Get Stuffed" in his acceptance speech (Sanders clashed with fellow unbeaten rider and crowd favourite Phil Crump in Heat 17 resulting in the Victorian rider's exclusion from the race). The venue has also hosted various South Australian championships, including the Sprintcar, Speedcar, Super Sedan, Street Stock, Solo, Sidecar, and Formula 500 state titles.

During its so far 35 years of existence, Speedway City has only had two fatal accidents. The first was on 25 January 1985 when local solo rider Kevin O'Connell crashed and hit the concrete wall between turns 3 and 4 at speed and was killed instantly. O'Connell's death was the catalyst that saw the end of bikes at the speedway and the permanent move to North Arm. The speedway suffered its second (and hopefully last) fatality in 1993 when Speedcar driver (and 1981 SA Solo Champion) Tony Boyle crashed on 22 January. Although he survived the accident itself, Boyle died eight days later in hospital from complications relating to the accident.

From 2001 to 2016 Speedway City was owned by former Speedcar driver Bob Sincock and Managed by Wendy Turner. The venue also had a name change in 1996 when Speedway Park was renamed Speedway City. The venue then became known as Truckworks Speedway City but that sponsorship finished at the end of the 2009/10 season. Starting in 2016, long time Adelaide based Super Sedan driver Bill Miller took over as the promoter of the venue. Miller's tenure also saw the venue have its 3rd name as it has now been renamed Adelaide Motorsport Park.

On 28 January 2012 Speedway City hosted the 50th Anniversary Australian Sprintcar Championship with NSW driver (and defending champion) Brooke Tatnell winning his 5th Australian Championship and following in the footsteps of his late father George Tatnell who won the 1988 championship at the speedway. A then 16-year-old Brooke Tatnell had made his Australian Championship debut at Speedway Park in 1988, making the 40 lap Final before a mid-race crash took him out of the event.

Speedway management would later honour George Tatnell following his death from cancer in 2007 with the annual "George Tatnell Cup" for Sprintcars. Tatnell and long time Rowley Park promoter Kym Bonython have also been honoured with the naming of the two stands in turns 1 and 2 as the George Tatnell Stand and the Kym Bonython Stand respectively.

== Track announcers ==
From its first meeting in 1979, the track announcers at the new speedway were the announcers from Rowley Park, David Sabine and media personality Rob Kelvin. Sabine would retire in the early 1980s and his place was taken variously by John Trenorden and Gary Hoffman. When MJS Promotions took control Kelvin was retained and joined by Brian Lamprell, a previous Rowley Park announcer. Kelvin and Lamprell teamed together until Lamprell moved interstate at the end of the 1991 season. He was replaced by John Cobby who joined Kelvin in the announcers booth around 1990. Rob Kelvin, who became the NWS9 Nightly News anchor from 1983, would commentate until the early 1990s. Cobby, a former motocross rider and the son of former Sprintcar driver Rick Cobby and the younger brother of current driver Jamie Cobby, continues to be the Speedway City lead announcer as of 2015. For over 20 years, the infield commentator who generally performed MC duties for podium presentations at championship or high-profile events as well as giving reports on cars/drivers that had either crashed or suffered mechanical failure was the popular Mal "Rosie" Rosenzweig. At the end of each meeting, Rosenzweig would always tell the spectators to have a safe journey home and remind them that the racing takes place on the racetrack, not on the road.

== Australian Championships ==
Since opening in 1978, Speedway Park/City has hosted various Australian Championships. These include:

- Australian Sprintcar Championship – 1980, 1988, 2000, 2014
- Australian Speedcar Championship – 1981, 1986, 1992, 2000, 2002*, 2003, 2004, 2014
- Australian Sidecar Championship – 1982
- Australian Solo Championship – 1983
- Australian Super Sedan Championship – 1983**, 1984, 1986, 1992, 2010
- Australian Hot Rod Championship – 1989

* 2002 Australian Speedcar Championship was sanctioned by NASR and not Speedcars Australia as previous.
** Speedway Park hosted the final round of a three-round Australian Super Sedan Championship in 1983. Other rounds were held at the Avalon Raceway and Premier Speedway in Victoria.

== Track Information ==
Length – 430 metres (470 yards), 1 metre out from the pole line
Width – 16 metres
Banking – 1.2 metres
Surface – Clay
Safety Fence – 1.8-metre concrete wall with 3.0-metre-high weld-mesh topped with 1.6-metre chain mesh above with 1 metre at a 45-degree angle to infield with cable attached
Spectator Fence – 1.0-metre-high cyclone mesh – 3.5 metres beyond catch fence
Lighting – TV Quality – 72 × 1500-watt Metal Halide (mounted on 18 poles in banks of 4).

== Famous competitors ==
Some of the famous competitors who have raced at Speedway City since its opening in 1979 include:

- Ian "Zeke" Agars ( (Australia) ) (Sprintcar)
- Grenville Anderson ( (Australia) ) (Super Sedan) †
- Alf Barbagallo ( (Australia) ) (Sprintcar)
- Steve Baker ( (Australia) ) (Solo)
- Bill Barrows ( (Australia) ) (Sprintcar)
- Ray Bishop ( (Australia) ) (Speedcar)
- Chris Blunden ( (Australia) ) (Super Sedan/Sprintcar)
- John Boulger ( (Australia) ) (Solo/Sprintcar/Speedcar)
- Don Bowey ( (Australia) ) (Formula 500)
- Ken Bowey ( (Australia) ) (Formula 500)
- Garry Brazier ( (Australia) ) (Sprintcar)
- Steve Brazier ( (Australia) ) (Sprintcar)
- Peter Carr ( (England) ) (Solo)
- Adam Clarke ( (Australia) ) (Speedcar)
- Peter Collins ( (England) ) (Solo)
- Phil Crump ( (Australia) ) (Solo)
- Garry Dillon ( (Australia) ) (Speedcar)
- Max Dumesny ( (Australia) ) (Sprintcar)
- Warrenne Ekins ( (Australia) ) (Speedcar)
- Robbie Farr ( (Australia) ) (Sprintcar)
- Mark Fiora ( (Australia) ) (Solo)
- Wally Francombe ( (Australia) ) (Super Sedan) †
- Trevor Green ( (Australia) ) (Speedcar/Sprintcar)
- Gary Guglielmi ( (Australia) ) (Solo)
- Phil Herreen ( (Australia) ) (Speedcar)
- Jim Irwin ( (Australia) ) (Sidecar)
- Jack Hewitt ( (United States) ) (Sprintcar)
- John Hughes ( (Australia) ) (Super Sedan/Grand National)
- John Jørgensen ( (Denmark) ) (Solo)
- Clarry Jones ( (Australia) ) (Sidecar)
- Kelly Kinser ( (United States) ) (Sprintcar)
- Mark Kinser ( (United States) ) (Sprintcar)
- Randy Kinser ( (United States) ) (Sprintcar)
- Steve Kinser ( (United States) ) (Sprintcar)
- Cory Kruseman ( (United States) ) (Speedcar)
- Dud Lambert ( (Australia) ) (Speedcar) †
- Danny Lasoski ( (United States) ) (Sprintcar)
- Phil March ( (Australia) ) (Speedcar/Sprintcar)
- Cary McCarthy ( (Australia) ) (Super Sedan/Grand National)
- Dean McCarthy ( (Australia) ) (Super Sedan)
- Mick McKeon ( (Australia) ) (Solo)
- Rick Miller ( (United States) ) (Solo)
- Shawn Moran ( (United States) ) (Solo)
- Garry Rush ( (Australia) ) (Sprintcar)
- Billy Sanders ( (Australia) ) (Solo) †
- Donny Schatz ( (United States) ) (Sprintcar)
- Brian Schultz ( (Australia) ) (Sidecar)
- Brad Scotcher ( (Australia) ) (Super Sedan)
- Mitch Shirra ( (New Zealand) ) (Solo)
- Danny Smith ( (United States) ) (Sprintcar)
- Steve Stewart (Speedcar/Super Sedan/Grand National)6 Times SA Sedan Champion and SA Speedcar Champion. One of South Australia's most successful Speedway Driver often underrated.
- Brooke Tatnell ( (Australia) ) (Sprintcar)
- George Tatnell ( (Australia) ) (Speedcar/Sprintcar) †
- Glyn Taylor ( (Australia) ) (Solo)
- John Titman ( (Australia) ) (Solo)
- Ron "Sleepy" Tripp ( (United States) ) (Speedcar)
- Bill Wigzell ( (Australia) ) (Speedcar) †
- Terry Wigzell ( (Australia) ) (Speedcar/Sprintcar)
- Doug Wyer ( (England) ) (Solo)

† – Deceaced Bill Miller Super Sedan

== Lap records ==
as of June 2016. All are 1 lap with a rolling start.

- 410 Sprintcars: 11.60 – (South Australia) Matt Egel, 5 February 2015
- 360 Sprintcars: 12.17 – (South Australia) Brendan Quinn, 15 November 2014
- V6 Sprints: 13.91 – (South Australia) Aiden Hall, 20 April 2014
- Formula 500: 14.11 – (South Australia) Brock Hallett, 3 December 2011
- Speedcars: 14.117 – (Western Australia) Todd Waddell, 15 November 2014
- Late model: 14.47 – (South Australia) Matt Crimmins, 5 February 2015
- Super Sedans: 14.71 – (South Australia) Ryan Alexander, 9 April 2016
- Wingless Sprints: 14.94 – (South Australia) Todd Wigzell, 20 April 2014
- AMCA Nationals: 16.32 – (South Australia) Jake Armstrong, 23 April 2016
- Legend Cars: 17.53 – (New South Wales) Tyson Williams, 27 March 2016
- Street Stocks: 18.32 – (South Australia) Darren Flatman, 23 March 2010
- Junior Sedans: 19.14 – (South Australia) Kooper Grieg, 23 April 2016

With the exception of the Solos and Sidecars which have not raced at the track since the early 1990s, the longest standing current track record at Speedway City is the 2 lap Speedcar record of 29.2 held by Sydney driver Rod Bowen. The record was set on 30 January 1998.
