= Avalon Raceway =

Auto racing track in Lara, Victoria, Australia

The Place for Pace
- Location: 210 Old Melbourne Road, Lara, Victoria
- Coordinates: 38°0′49″S 144°27′20″E
- Capacity: 10,000
- Operator: Corio Park PIL
- Broke ground: 1976
- Opened: 1976
- Major events: World Series Sprintcars; Australian Speedcar Championship; Australian Super Sedan Championship; Australian Sidecar Championship; Australian Speedcar Grand Prix; Easter Sprintcar Trail
- Website: http://avalonraceway.com.au/

Oval
- Surface: Clay Sand Mix
- Length: 0.242 miles (0.390 km)
- Race lap record: 0:10.930 (Steven Lines, , 2011, Sprintcar)

Avalon Raceway is a dirt track racing venue located in Lara, Victoria, Australia. The track is based on a clay sand mix, is oval shaped and is 390 metres (430 yards) in length.

== History ==
The track opened in 1976 thanks to the efforts of brothers Doug and Norm Drew, drivers from the area who like others needed a venue to race at after the closure of Torquay Speedway. Early on the big attraction to the new Speedway were the bikes with such Solo riders as World Champions Ole Olsen, Ivan Mauger and Barry Briggs battling Australian riders such as Victorian favourite Phil Crump. Sidecars were also a big draw and the Speedway hosted the 1980 Australian Sidecar Championship as well as numerous Victorian Sidecar title meetings.

The introduction of clay to the track surface in the early 1990s saw bike racing off the program at Avalon Raceway. Sprint car racing had been the biggest draw in Australian speedway since the late 1970s and the clay surface suited this type of oval track racing. Since this time Avalon has been a regular of the World Series Sprintcars and was also the home of the Australian Speedcar Grand Prix from 2003 until 2010. The WSS date is often an international affair, as the event occurs days after Christmas Day and United States-based drivers often participate during their off-season. NASCAR stars Christopher Bell and Kyle Larson, World of Outlaws star Brad Sweet, and Knoxville Nationals winner Jason Johnson have participated in sprint car races at this circuit during their off-season.

The outright lap record is held by South Australian driver Steven Lines from Mount Gambier, with a time of 10.930 seconds, set on 12 November 2011, in a 410 Sprintcar.

The track is governed by Speedway Australia, the main governing body for Speedway tracks in Australia.

Common classes here include Sprintcars, Speedcars, Formula 500 and Junior Sedans

== Lap Records ==
As of February 2014. All have a 1 lap rolling start.

- 410 Sprintcars: 0:10.930 – Steven Lines – 12 November 2011
- 360 Sprintcars: 0:12.54 – M. Reed – 11 January 2014
- Speedcars: 0:13:70 – Michael Pickens – 19 March 2005
- Formula 500: 0:13.98 – L. Williams – 21 February 2009
- Super Sedans: 0:14:90 – Peter Nicola – 1 January 2005
- Super Rods: 0:15:48 – L. Podger – 12 March 2005
- Wingless Sprints: 0:15.60 – L. Weel – 29 March 2014
- GP Midgets: 0:15:83 – D. Meyers – 19 December 2009
- V8 Dirt Modifieds: 0:15:93 – L. Hobson – 23 March 1981
- National Rods: 0:15.93 – L. Hobson – 23 March 1991
- Modified Production: 00:16:01 – J. Drew – 30 March 2007
- Street Stocks: 0:18.09 – M. Dann – 1 April 2006
