= Perth Motorplex =

Motorsport venue in Perth, Western Australia

Coordinates: 32°13′0″S 115°47′18″E

Perth Motorplex is a motorsport venue located at Kwinana Beach, Western Australia. It caters mainly for drag racing and speedway, although other events are held there regularly. Over 275,000 patrons attend the venue each year to many varied events. The Perth Motorplex holds rounds of the World Series Sprintcars championship.

== History ==
Perth Motorplex (formerly Quit Motorplex for naming rights reasons) opened in 2000. It replaced the Claremont Speedway which was run at the Claremont Showground from 1927, and the Ravenswood Raceway Drag Racing strip. Many Claremont loyalists were unhappy with the change saying it destroyed almost 75 years of heritage as were many Ravenswood fans. Nonetheless, the changes suited a growing population in Perth as the racetrack at Claremont was situated literally across the road from housing estates. Also, the owner of the Claremont Showgrounds, the Royal Agricultural Society of Western Australia, while not wishing to lose their long time tenant, wanted to re-develop the main arena, which doubled as the speedway, into a fully grassed oval suitable for the Perth Royal Show and other outdoor festivals and concerts as well as for sports such as Australian rules football and cricket.

The Motorplex actually brought drag racing some 45 kilometres (28 mi) closer to Perth than Ravenswood, while for speedway fans the Motorplex saw the sport leave the city and move 26 kilometres (16 mi) south.

=== Speedway ===
In the Western Australian tradition of having longer tracks than most of those in Australia, the Motorplex Speedway is a 540-metre (1/3 mi), 500-metre (550-yard), dirt oval (in contrast to Claremont which was 586 metres or 641 yards in length), and since its opening has hosted the Australian Sprint Car, Speedcar (midget), Super Sedan (dirt late model) Championships, as well as hosting rounds of the Speedcar Pro Series. It also hosts various Western Australian state championship meetings. Since the 2024-25 season, the Perth Motorplex hosts the country's richest sprint car event, the High Limit Racing Perth International, the first race in Australia to pay over 100,000 AUD and run days after Boxing Day featuring visiting North American sprint car stars against Australian drivers, which creates Australia's "Month of Money" from the High Limit in Western Australia to the Grand Annual Sprintcar Classic in Victoria on Australia Day weekend.

On the inside of the main speedway track is a 420-metre (460-yard) Motorcycle speedway track that is rarely used for anything other than staging of race cars before events and for demolition derbies.

Bikes generally run at the 142-metre (155-yard) Pinjar Park Speedway located north of Perth near the Barbagallo Raceway. The bike track did host rounds of the 2001, 2002 and 2005 Western Australian Solo Championships.

=== Drag Racing ===
In 2021, Australian National Drag Racing Association announced the establishment of an annual Australian Drag Racing Championship series, with Perth's drag strip as one of five venues across the country to host a round in the inaugural season.

== Motorvation ==
Motorvation, an annual car show in January, presents display-only parades called supercruises, elite car exhibitions, drag racing challenges, burnout competitions and a beauty contest called Miss Motorvation. Vehicle entries are limited to about 600. Motorvation was invented by Rob Woodcock and Phil Cockayne who also started Perth City Street Machine Club.
