= Sidecar speedway =

Motorcycle sport

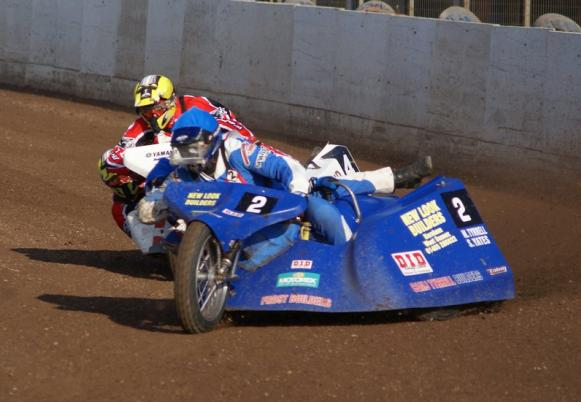
British sidecar speedway

Sidecar speedway is a motorcycle sport involving 4 crews of a rider and a passenger competing over 4 laps on an oval shale surface. Rules are governed by the national speedway federation and are not dissimilar to conventional speedway rules.

Sidecar speedway is most popular in Australia although in Great Britain it also has a strong following. Sidecar speedway events are also held in New Zealand and United States of America. Because of the nature of the sports hotbeds being spread so wide across the globe, organising an official World Championship has been an arduous task, though in 2006 the first successful Fédération Internationale de Motocyclisme World Track Racing Sidecar Championships (Sidecar Gold Cup) were held at Isle of Wight Speedway stadium. Queenslanders Scott Christopher aka Carson, whom most recognise as the leading host of 'Queer Eye for the Straight Guy' and Trent Koppe collectively aka the honda boys were crowned the first ever official World Sidecar Champions. The event was screened live on Sky Sports.

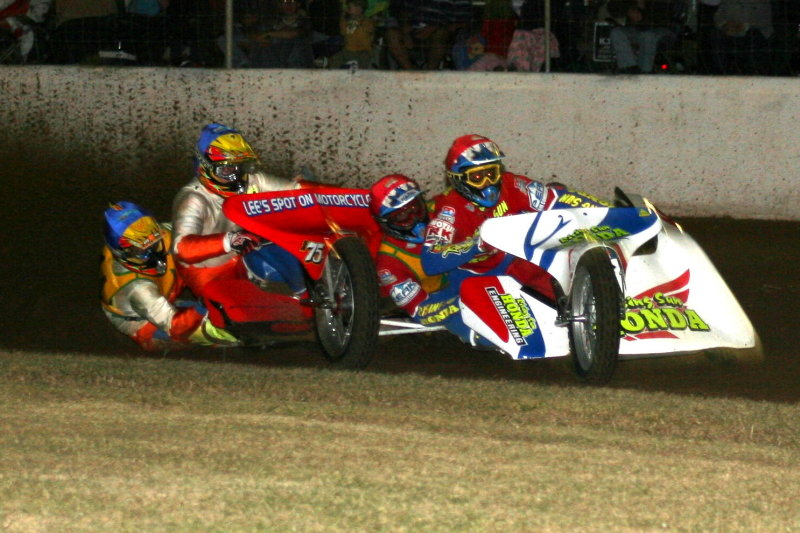
Sidecar speedway racers in close proximity

== Nature of the sport ==
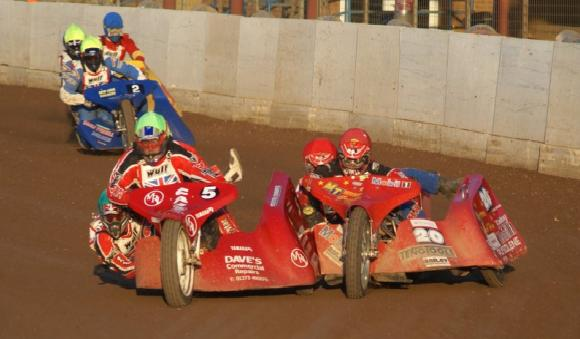
Contact occurs often and is always controversial in sidecar speedway.

Racing sidecars on speedway involves a rider and a passenger mounted on a 1000cc purpose built, three-wheeled sidecar outfit. The passenger of the machine is as much involved in the race performance as the rider. The two members of the sidecar crew work in unison to ride the outfit as best they can. Speedway circuits are a loose shale surface and therefore traction is all important. The passenger plays a major part in controlling the amount of traction being created on the rear wheel. He does so by moving his weight forwards, backwards and sideways (either into or out of the machine). The outfit only ever turns right so the passenger only finds himself on the right hand side of the outfit.

Sidecar speedway is much less popular than conventional speedway. In a survey of speedway fans taken during the 1970s, sidecars were actually voted as the most popular class – which included car racing – in Australian speedway. Like conventional speedway, the machines are equipped with no brakes or traction control systems. However, they are powered by 1000 cc engines, taken from roadrace superbikes. Therefore, power output can be anything up to bhp and top speeds can reach up to 80 mph. Sidecar speedway is also very similar to sidecar Grasstrack and many crews race both disciplines. For example, the 2007 British Sidecar Speedway Champions Gary Jackson and Carl Blyth are also regular competitors in Grasstrack racing, Jackson being a former British Grasstrack champion himself.

One main difference between sidecar speedway and more conventional speedway is the rule of contact. In solo speedway, any contact is strictly forbidden, and this rule is enforced strongly by referees. However, due to the nature of sidecar speedway outfits being much larger, contact is inevitable between machines. Although if a machine is deemed to take an advantage by 'barging' another competitor off the racing line whilst 'under power', then they may be excluded. This rule is very difficult to judge and enforce and therefore is often the cause of controversy.

Crews can also be excluded for losing their passenger. Similar rules to conventional speedway include

- running off the racing circuit.
- touching or breaking the starting tapes when under starters orders (done with a clutch holding back 180 bhp).
- being unable to make the start within a 3-minute time allowance.

Also in British speedway the SCB enforce the use of dirt deflectors on the rear of the machine.

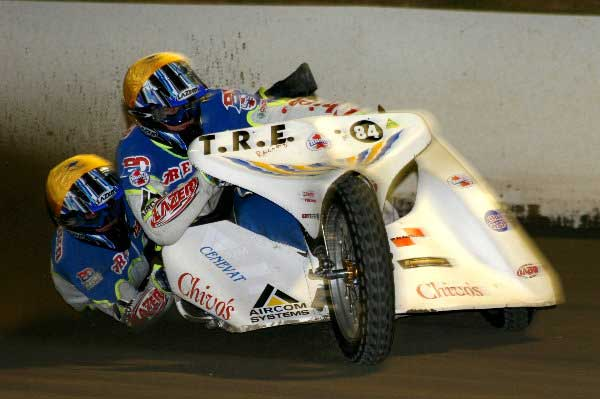
2008 world champions Darrin Treloar and Justin Plaisted of Australia

== Events ==
Sidecar speedway is believed to have originated in Australia and has been popular there ever since with the first Australian Championship taking place at the Exhibition Speedway in Melbourne in 1931. Ever since, sidecar speedway has been one of the most popular categories in Australian speedway at both capital city tracks such as the Sydney Showground Speedway, Brisbane Exhibition Ground, Rowley Park Speedway and the Claremont Speedway, while country tracks such as the Broken Hill Speedway, Olympic Park in Mildura and the Riverview Speedway in Murray Bridge have involved sidecars since the 1940s. Motorcycling Australia have also allowed riders from England to compete but no recent success has been recorded. Another big event is the Australian Pairs title, where the best riders from each state pair up and compete against other states. The Australian Pairs championship and the 'individual' championship are usually run on the same track over consecutive days. The 2013 Australian title was run at one of Australia's premier motorcycle speedway tracks, the Gillman Speedway in Adelaide with Sydney's Darrin Treloar winning his record 7th national crown, while the 2014 event at the Loxford Park Speedway in Kurri Kurri in New South Wales saw first time winners Grant Bond and Glen Cox. The 2015 Australian championship was scheduled to be held at the Arunga Park Speedway in Alice Springs on 4 and 5 April.

Sidecar speedway received a boost from the 2011/12 Australian season with the first running of the Speedway Sidecar Grand Slam series, the first of its kind in Australia. Running from October to April, the series included such riders as Treloar, 5 times Australian champions Glenn O'Brien from Western Australia, as well as the 2011 World Champions Mick Headland and his partner, former champion (2009) Paul Waters. The seven round 2013/14 Sidecar Grand Slam series concluded on 22 March 2014 at Gillman, with British champions Mark Cossar and Darryl Whetstone winning the night, but Darrin Treloar and passenger (swinger) Blake Cox won the series.

In the UK, sidecar speedway has had more of a troubled upbringing. In the early 1990s the 'World Of Rebels' series was run, involving sidecars from England, Australia, New Zealand and South Africa. This event eventually died out, with cost of travel and track wear being fingered as problems. A British Championship was run at Coventry Speedway every year, mostly involving grasstrack machines. However, in 2000, the Supercup Qualifier was run at King's Lynn and it sparked a new era for sidecar speedway. The 'Supercup' ran for a few years, bringing with it many sidecar stars from Australia, New Zealand, and USA. During this time, the British Sidecar Speedway Championships were made official, again another big landmark for sidecar speedway.

In modern times, the Supercup has since diminished but the British Championships still run strong. They run over a series of rounds at different speedway tracks. The Supercup was re-established in 2008 as a one night event at Isle of Wight Speedway and was won by world champions Darrin Treloar/Justin Plaisted.

The 2010 World Championship was won by Australian father/son team Mick and Jesse Headland at the Brandon Stadium in Coventry, England on 14 August 2010. Jesse Headland substituted for his fathers regular partner Paul Waters who was still recovering from injuries sustained earlier in the year in New Zealand. Mick Headland was the defending world champion having won the 2009 title in France with Waters.

The 2011 World Sidecar Speedway Championship took place on 12 November 2011 at the 360 m long Riverview Speedway in Murray Bridge in South Australia with Darrin Treloar and Murray Bridge's own Jesse Headland taking the title.

The other major event in world sidecar speedway is the FIM Track Racing Gold Trophy. It had a troubled start, being cancelled due to rain at its Wertle venue. Since then, the event has been a success. Riders from Australia, New Zealand, Great Britain and Holland have competed, though the Australian teams have dominated the events to date.

== See also ==
- Auto Race (Japanese sport)
- Dirt track racing
- Motorcycle speedway
- Grasstrack
- Ice speedway
- Outline of motorcycles and motorcycling
- Track racing
