= Kerry Madsen =

Australian racing driver

Kerry Madsen (3 December 1971) is an Australian sprintcar driver who has raced with the World of Outlaws in both his home country, and predominantly the United States. For years, the Saint Mary's, New South Wales, Australia native has driven a 410 winged sprintcar.

Madsen is from St Marys, New South Wales, Australia; a suburb of Sydney. Though he was born in Christchurch, New Zealand. He has been driving a sprintcar since the 1990s, and has had success in both America and Australia.

Madsen has been involved with numerous race teams over the years, but is now involved with the Keneric Racing team. For a few seasons in Australia, he drove for the 92.9 Kendrick Race team, sponsored by Bob Gavranich from Perth, Western Australia. Together, the two joined, and have formed a team to race in America. The Keneric Racing 92, owned by Bob Gavranich, is running the World of Outlaws circuit in America. However, they are not competing for points in the WoO, they plan on attending at least 60 Outlaw races, including races all over the country. Kerry "THE MADMAN" Madsen is the current Australian Sprintcar champion for two years in a row 2016 and 2017. Brother Ian Madsen came second in this years (2017) Australian Sprintcar Championship in Sydney

== Career results ==
=== 1991 ===
- Started Racing Sprintcars in 1990–91
- Won his first race at Parramatta City Raceway in his opening season
- Raced a Non-Wing sprintcar at Eldora Speedway in the $10,000 to win Four Crown Nationals - Finished 10th in the A-Main

=== 1992 ===
- Raced at the $50,000 to Win Kings Royal at Eldora Speedway - Finished 11th in the B-Main

=== 1993 ===
- Won his first race on American soil at KC-Raceway in July 1993

=== 1995 ===
- Raced the Ohio Speedweek making all A-Features except the final night at Attica Raceway Park

=== 1997 ===
- Finished 2nd in the Australian Sprintcar Championship at Bunbury Speedway in Western Australia

=== 1998 ===
- Won his first feature race at Knoxville Raceway in June in the #99 car.

=== 1999 ===
- Finished 2nd in the Australian Sprintcar Championship at Premier Speedway in Warrnambool
- Won the $4000 to win Danny Young Memorial at Iowa State Fair Speedway in May
- Won another race at Knoxville Raceway
- Finished 23rd in the D-Main of the $100,000 to win Knoxville Nationals in the 2a car.

=== 2000 ===
- Raced 6 World Series Sprintcars races in January finishing with two third placing's and four top ten finishes.
- Finished 10th in the C-Main of the Knoxville Nationals in the VanderEcken 10v car.

=== 2001 ===
- Won his first World Series Sprintcars A-Main at Brisbane International Raceway in January.
- Won at Knoxville Raceway on the weekend preceding the Nationals.
- Made his first Knoxville Nationals A-Feature finishing 19th in the #82 Gunder car.
- Had 3 feature wins at Parramatta City Raceway in five starts at the end of 2001.
- Won the 22nd Australian Sprintcar Grand Prix at Parramatta City Raceway in December

=== 2002 ===
- Finished 6th at the $50,000 to Win at Parramatta City Raceway in January.
- Finished 4th in the Australian Title at Parramatta City Raceway in February.
- Had 3 Feature race wins at Knoxville Raceway.
- Finished 24th in the Knoxville Nationals A-Feature in the #82 Gunder car.

=== 2003 ===
- Won the Australian Sprintcar Championship at Premier Speedway Warrnambool in January in his own #29 car.
- Finished 2nd in the Knoxville Raceway Track Championship.
- Finished 17th in the Knoxville Nationals A-Feature in the #82 Gunder car.
- Rounded out the year with 10 Feature race wins, helped by 5 late season wins at Parramatta City Raceway

=== 2004 ===
- Won the World of Outlaws Down Under Preliminary at Parramatta City Raceway.
- Opened the year with two race victories at Parramatta City Raceway
- Finished 2nd to Max Dumesny at the Grand Annual Sprintcar Classic.
- Finished the year with three more race wins at Parramatta City Raceway in the A1 car.

=== 2005 ===
- Won the World of Outlaws Down Under Preliminary at Parramatta City Raceway.
- Finished 3rd in the World of Outlaws Down Under A-Main.
- Won the $30,000 to Win Grand Annual Sprintcar Classic at Premier Speedway Warrnambool.
- Won 5 races at Knoxville Raceway.
- Won the Knoxville Raceway Track Championship

=== 2006 ===
- Won at Bay Park Speedway in New Zealand.
- Won 9 feature races for the year.

=== 2007 ===
- Won his 2nd Grand Annual Sprintcar Classic at Premier Speedway Warrnambool.
- Won his 1st World of Outlaws A-Feature at Volusia Speedway Park in the Helm #11H car.
- Finished 23rd in the $50,000 to win Kings Royal at Eldora Speedway.
- Won his 2nd World of Outlaws A-Feature at Perris Auto Speedway in October.
- Won his 2nd World Series Sprintcars A-Main at the Perth Motorplex in the Leisk #29 car.
- Won the World of Outlaws Kevin Gobrecht 'Rookie of the Year' Award.

=== 2008 ===
- Won his third straight Grand Annual Sprintcar Classic.
- Won the $10,000 to win World Challenge race at the Knoxville Nationals.
- Finished 14th in the $50,000 to Win Gold Cup at Skagit Speedway in the Vermeer #55 car.
- Finished 2nd at $10,000 to Win World of Outlaws A-Feature at Heartland Park Topeka.
- Finished a career high 6th in the World of Outlaws Championship points standings.

=== 2009 ===
- Won his third World Series Sprintcars A-Main at Parramatta City Raceway in the Vermeer #55 car.
- Finished 3rd in the Grand Annual Sprintcar Classic at Premier Speedway Warrnambool.
- Won the All Stars A-Feature at the Belleville High Banks.
- Won his first race for Kendrick Racing at the Manjimup Speedway in the #92 Kendrick car.

=== 2011 ===
- Finished 2nd in the Australian Sprintcar Championship at the Premier Speedway in Warrnambool.

=== 2014 ===
- Won his first kings Royal at Eldora speedway in Ohio for 50 thousand dollars
- Won his first Iron Man at I55 speedway
- got the world record for closest win by 5000s of a second

=== 2015 ===
- Won the $10,000 to win Kings Challenge at the Borderline Speedway in Mount Gambier in January.

=== 2016 ===
- Won the 2016 Australian Sprintcar Title.

=== 2017 ===
- Won the 2017 Australian Sprintcar Title.

=== 2018 ===
- Won the 2018 Australian Sprintcar Title

=== 2019 ===
- Won 360 Knoxville Nationals and first 360 win

=== 2026 ===
- Won his first High Limit Racing feature at Lucas Oil Speedway
