= Australian Sprintcar Grand Prix =

The Australian Sprintcar Grand Prix is an annual dirt track racing meeting held in Australia for Sprintcars. The meeting is traditionally held at the Sydney Speedway (formerly the Parramatta City Raceway) and was first staged in the 1978/79 season.

The first Australian Sprintcar Grand Prix was held in 1978/79 and was won by Sydney-based driver Garry Rush.

The race is currently known as the Valvoline Australian Sprintcar Grand Prix due to sponsorship from oil company Valvoline.

The current champion is California sprint car driver Brad Sweet. The reigning World of Outlaws champion has won the event three times, most recently on 26 December 2019.

== Winners since 1978/79 ==
| Year | Winner |
| 1978/79 | Garry Rush (NSW) |
| Year | Winner |
| 1979/80 | Bob Blacklaw (NSW) |
| 1980/81 | Bob Blacklaw (NSW) |
| 1981/82 | Not held |
| 1982/83 | Rick Unger ( (United States) ) |
| 1983/84 | Garry Rush (NSW) |
| 1984/85 | Danny Smith ( (United States) ) |
| 1985/86 | Danny Smith ( (United States) ) |
| 1986/87 | Max Dumesny (Vic) |
| 1987/88 | Bob Tunks (NSW) |
| 1988/89 | Not held |
| Year | Winner |
| 1989/90 | Brooke Tatnell (NSW) |
| 1990/91 | Brooke Tatnell (NSW) |
| 1991/92 | Steve Kinser ( (United States) ) |
| 1992/93 | Steve Kinser ( (United States) ) |
| 1993/94 | Skip Jackson (NSW) |
| 1994/95 | Brooke Tatnell (NSW) |
| 1995/96 | Joey Saldana ( (United States) ) |
| 1996/97 | Steve Kinser ( (United States) ) |
| 1997/98 | Garry Rush (NSW) |
| 1998/99 | Brooke Tatnell (NSW) |
| Year | Winner |
| 1999/2000 | Robbie Farr (NSW) |
| 2000/01 | Max Dumesny (Vic) |
| 2001/02 | Kerry Madsen (NSW) |
| 2002/03 | Joey Saldana ( (United States) ) |
| 2003/04 | Joey Saldana ( (United States) ) |
| 2004/05 | Donny Schatz ( (United States) ) |
| 2005/06 | Donny Schatz ( (United States) ) |
| 2006/07 | Donny Schatz ( (United States) ) |
| 2007/08 | Donny Schatz ( (United States) ) |
| 2008/09 | Steve Kinser ( (United States) ) |
| Year | Winner |
| 2009/10 | Donny Schatz ( (United States) ) |
| 2010/11 | Garry Brazier (NSW) |
| 2011/12 | Jason Meyers ( (United States) ) |
| 2012/13 | Ian Madsen (NSW) |
| 2013/14 | Kraig Kinser ( (United States) ) |
| 2014/15 | Brad Sweet ( (United States) ) |
| 2015/16 | Brad Sweet ( (United States) ) |
| 2016/17 | Robbie Farr (NSW) |
| 2017/18 | Robbie Farr (NSW) |
| 2017/18 | Marcus Dumesny (NSW) |
| 2019/20 | Brad Sweet ( (United States) |

== See also ==
- Australian Sprintcar Championship
- Grand Annual Sprintcar Classic
- World Series Sprintcars
