= Australian Speedway Masters Series =

Annual motorcycle races

The Australian Speedway Masters Series (also known as the International Speedway Masters Series and the Series 500) was an annual Motorcycle speedway series of races held each Australian speedway season between 1995 and 2000.

The first of its type for motorcycle speedway in Australia, the competition featured the best riders from Australia racing against the best riders from around the world. The series was the brainchild of promoter and television commentator David Tapp who did most of the ground work as well as providing the television commentary.

After being run over 13 rounds in 1995, the years 1996, 1997 and 1998 saw the series run over 10 rounds, 1999 was run over 11 rounds and the final series in 2000 was run over 13 rounds. Events were run in the traditional 20 Heat format with Semi-finals and an "A Final". Although Australian riders won the series from 1996 to 2000, incredibly in the inaugural 13 round series in 1995 saw no local rider won a round.

The inaugural Series 500 meeting was run at the Bunbury Speedway in Western Australia and was won by multiple Long Track World Champion Simon Wigg who was right at home on the 530 metres (580 yards) long track. Bunbury also hosted Round 1 of the 1996 series and in a repeat of 1995 Simon Wigg emerged victorious.

The then reigning World Champion, Sweden's Tony Rickardsson was the inaugural series winner in 1995.

== Notable Riders ==
Some of the riders who competed in the Speedway Masters Series between 1995 and 2000 include:

- (Australia) Leigh Adams
- (Australia) Craig Boyce
- (United Kingdom) Marvyn Cox
- (Australia) Jason Crump
- (Australia) Glenn Doyle
- (United States) Charles Ermolenko
- (United States) Sam Ermolenko
- (United States) Billy Hamill
- (United States) Greg Hancock
- (Sweden) Peter Karlsson
- (United Kingdom) Mark Loram
- (Australia) Shane Parker
- (Australia) Mick Poole
- (Sweden) Tony Rickardsson
- (United Kingdom) Joe Screen
- (United Kingdom) Andy Smith
- (Denmark) Jan Stæchmann
- (Czech Republic) George Štancl
- (Australia) Ryan Sullivan
- (Poland) Piotr Świst
- (United Kingdom) Kelvin Tatum
- (New Zealand) Mark Thorpe
- (Czech Republic) Tomáš Topinka
- (Finland) Olli Tyrväinen
- (Australia) Craig Watson
- (United Kingdom) Simon Wigg
- (Australia) Todd Wiltshire
- (Norway) Rune Holta

== Tracks ==
Some of the tracks used in the Speedway Masters Series included:

- Avalon Raceway
- Borderline Speedway
- Brisbane Exhibition Ground
- Bunbury Speedway
- Claremont Speedway
- Fraser Park Speedway
- Gosford Speedway
- Newcastle Motordrome
- Olympic Park Speedway
- Olympic Park Stadium
- Parramatta City Raceway
- Premier Speedway
- Rockhampton Showground
- Wayville Showgrounds

== Series 500 winners ==
Year	No. of Rounds	Winner	Runner-up	3rd place
1995	(Australia) 13	(Sweden) Tony Rickardsson (197 pts)	(United Kingdom) Simon Wigg (193 pts)	(United States) Sam Ermolenko (189 pts)
1996	(Australia) 10	(Australia) Craig Boyce (162 pts)	(United States) Sam Ermolenko (138 pts)	(Sweden) Tony Rickardsson (136 pts)
1997	(Australia) 10	(Australia) Leigh Adams (194 pts)	(Australia) Craig Boyce (160 pts)	(United States) Greg Hancock (128 pts)
1998	(Australia) 10	(Australia) Leigh Adams (139 pts)	(Australia) Ryan Sullivan (131 pts)	(Australia) Todd Wiltshire (126 pts)
1999	(Australia) 10	(Australia) Jason Crump (212 pts)	(Australia) Leigh Adams (168 pts)	(Australia) Todd Wiltshire (160 pts)
2000	(Australia) 13	(Australia) Leigh Adams (246 pts)	(Australia) Todd Wiltshire (195 pts)	(United States) Billy Hamill (170 pts)

== See also ==
- Sport in Australia
