= Jack Hewitt =

American racing driver (born 1951)

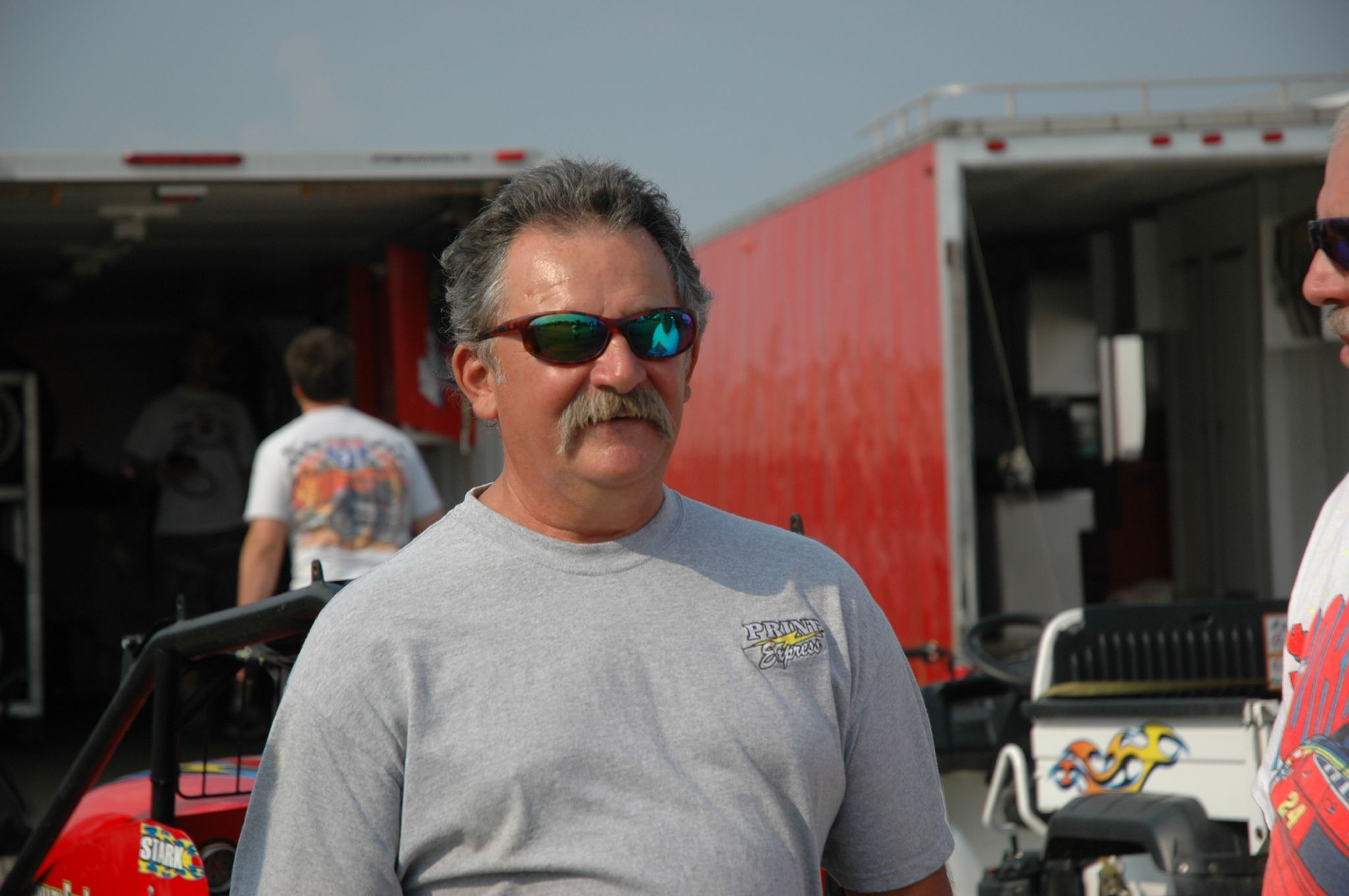
- Hewitt in 2007 at the Hewitt Classic
- Born: Jack Hewitt; July 8, 1951 (age 75); Troy, Ohio, U.S.
- Achievements: 1986, 1987 USAC Silver Crown Series Champion; 1985 All Star Circuit of Champions Champion; 1985 Ohio Sprint Speedweek Champion; 1983, 1990, 1991, 1997, 1998 4-Crown Nationals Wingless Sprint Winner; 1986, 1988, 1989, 1991, 1994, 1995, 1996, 1998 4-Crown Nationals Silver Crown Winner; 1987, 1993, 1998 4-Crown Nationals Midget Winner; 1996, 1997, 1998 4-Crown Nationals Modified Winner; 1983, 1995 Tony Hulman Classic Winner; 1986, 1988, 1989 Hoosier Hundred Winner; 1990 Brad Doty Classic Winner; 1991 Belleville Midget Nationals Winner
- Awards: National Sprint Car Hall of Fame Inductee (2002)

IndyCar Series career
- 2 races run over 1 year
- 2014 position: 34th
- Best finish: 34th (1998)
- First race: 1998 Indianapolis 500 (Indianapolis)
- Last race: 1998 New England 200 (Loudon)
Wins	Podiums	Poles
0	0	0
- Statistics up to date as of July 14, 2023.

Jack Hewitt (born July 8, 1951), is an American former professional dirt track racing driver. He is a two-time USAC Silver Crown Series champion and an All Star Circuit of Champions champion.

== Racing career ==
Hewitt was a two-time champion in the USAC Silver Crown Series in 1986 and 1987 and is second all-time in Silver Crown wins list with 23. In the USAC National Sprint Car series, he is fourth in all-time wins with 46. He also won the All Star Circuit of Champions championship in 1985 and his 56 wins in that series place him in the top-five all-time.

== Personal life ==
Hewitt is the son of Sprint Car legend Don Hewitt.

== Racing career ==
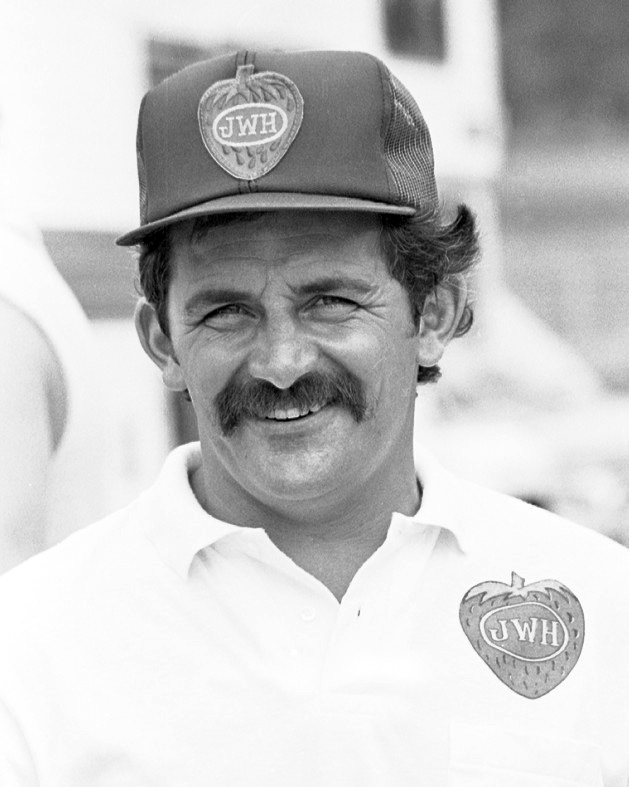
Jack Hewitt in 1986

Hewitt began his sprint car racing career in 1975 at Eldora Speedway, taking three wins in his inaugural season.

Hewitt raced in the 1998 Indianapolis 500, placing twelfth. After his venture into IndyCars, he returned to sprint cars until he had a very serious crash in 2002 from which he was lucky to escape with his life.

On September 26, 1998, Hewitt won the USAC Sprint, USAC Midget, USAC Silver Crown, and UMP Modified features at Eldora Speedway. By doing so he became the first and only driver to win all four divisions of racing at the 4-Crown Nationals held at Eldora Speedway in Rossburg, Ohio.

Hewitt also made several trips to Australia during his career. He first appeared as part of the four man USA sedan teams that raced mainly at the Liverpool Speedway and Newcastle Motordrome during the late 1970s and early 1980s (while sometimes also driving Sprintcars). He won he 1980 Marlboro Grand National 100 lap event at Liverpool and later in the decade returned to Australia as a Sprintcar driver, winning the Grand Annual Sprintcar Classic at the Premier Speedway in Victoria in 1991 where he defeated fellow American Danny Smith, and leading Australian driver Max Dumesney.

== Honors and awards ==
- Hewitt was inducted in the National Sprint Car Hall of Fame in 2002.
- Hewitt is honored with an annual car race called the Jack Hewitt Classic at Waynesfield Raceway Park in Waynesfield, Ohio. The Jack Hewitt Classic has been held in years past at the Kokomo Speedway in Kokomo, Indiana, and also at Attica Raceway Park in Attica, Ohio

== Motorsports Career Results ==
(key)

=== USAC Silver Crown Series ===
Year	Wins	Finish	Points
1978	0		
1980	0		
1981	0	3rd	
1982	0		
1983	0	14th	
1984	0		
1985	0	6th	
1986	6	1st	
1987	2	1st	
1988	2	2nd	
1989	2	4th	
1990	1		
1991	1		
1992	0	4th	
1993	2	5th	
1994	1	5th	
1995	2	3rd	
1996	1	7th	
1997	0	9th	
1998	1	7th	
1999	1	3rd	
2000	1	11th	
2001	0		
2002	0	49th	
2014	0	50th	

=== All Star Circuit of Champions ===
Year	Wins	Finish	Points
1980	2	2nd	2772
1983	1	9th	1014
1984	5	8th	1036
1985	12	1st	3654
1986	8	4th	3219
1987	2	6th	2682
1988	7	6th	2845
1989	10	4th	2900

=== World of Outlaws ===
Year	Wins	Finish	Points
1978	0	5th	2698
1979	1	9th	4380
1980	0	11th	2910
1982	2	13th	2692
1989	0	14th	3675

=== American open-wheel racing ===
(key) (Races in bold indicate pole position; races in italics indicate fastest lap)

==== Indy Racing League ====
Indy Racing League results
Year	Team	Chassis	No.	Engine	1	2	3	4	5	6	7	8	9	10	11	Rank	Points	Ref
1998	PDM Racing	G-Force GF01B	18	Oldsmobile	WDW	PHX	INDY; 12	TXS	NHA; 25	DOV	CLT	PPIR	ATL	TX2	LVS	34th	23	
