= Newcastle Motordrome =

Dirt track racing venue in Tomago, New South Wales

- Location: Old Punt Road, Tomago, New South Wales, Australia
- Coordinates: 32°49′19″S 151°42′24″E
- Capacity: 15,000
- Operator: Peter Gurbiel (1977–1983. 1984–1998); Barry Lewis (1983–1984); David Lander (1998–2002)
- Broke ground: 1977
- Opened: 1977
- Closed: 14 July 2002
- Former names: Jerilderie Park Speedway; Newcastle International Motordrome; Winfield Newcastle Motordrome; Wynn's Newcastle Motordrome
- Major events: Australian Sprintcar Championship; Australian Speedcar Championship; Australian Speedcar Grand Prix; Australian Solo Championship; Australian Sidecar championship World Series Sprintcars; Australian Super Sedan Championship; Australian Formula 500 Championship

Oval
- Surface: dolomite and clay mix Asphalt (early-mid-1980s only)
- Length: 0.249 mi (0.400 km)

Newcastle Motordrome was a dirt track racing venue located on the Old Punt Road in Tomago, New South Wales, just north of the Hunter River and 12 kilometres (7.5 mi) north of the city of Newcastle. The ¼-mile speedway operated from its opening in 1977 until it was sold in 2002. The site of the Motordrome is now warehouses and light industrial factories.

== History ==
Even though some believe Motorcycle Speedway was started in the Hunter Region of NSW in Maitland in 1923, motorcycle racing of the same nature was occurring on showgrounds and cinder circuits in Australia and overseas well before 1923. For instance in the Newcastle area, racing was held at the still operating Newcastle Showground as early as 1919, though it wasn't until 1973 with the opening of Jerilderie Park Speedway, later to become the Newcastle Motordrome, that Newcastle had a dedicated speedway track that wasn't a showground although there was a short-lived 1/2 mile showground Speedway track at Hamilton in Newcastle as early as 1926 and Midget cars often made the trip from Sydney to Newcastle to race at a Speedway track on Union St.

The Motordrome was originally opened as Jerilderie Park Speedway and run and promoted by Peter Gurbiel, who also ran the Tralee Speedway in Australia's capital city Canberra, and quickly became the centre of speedway racing in country NSW with the track hosting many Australian Championships including the Australian Sprintcar Championship (1983), Australian Solo Championship (1989), Australian Speedcar Championship (1995/96), Australian Sidecar championship (1991), Australian Super Sedan Championship (1980/81, 1989/90 and 1995/96) as well as hosting the Australian Speedcar Grand Prix in 1999, various NSW State championships and rounds of the World Series Sprintcars.

Events at the Motordrome, especially for the Sprintcars, Solo Test matches with Australia facing visiting teams such as England and various "Rest of the World" teams, and big Sedan tests against visiting American teams often brought in capacity crowds of 15,000 people proving the popularity of the sport in the region.

Categories to regularly run at the Motordrome during its 25-year existence were Sprintcars, Speedcars, Super Sedans, Solos, Sidecars, Grand National Sedans, Compact Speedcars and Litre Sprints

The speedway originally had a dolomite and clay mix surface, but was paved during the early to mid-1980s before the asphalt was dug up and the original surface was restored. During the time the track was asphalt a smaller motorcycle track was placed on the infield, the track running just inside asphalt track, but when the asphalt was dug up the bikes once again raced on the 400 metres (440 yards) D-shaped main track.

The Motordrome was also the site of the first ever visit by an official sporting team from the USSR to the Hunter Region of NSW when on 8 December 1990 the Russians took on a strong NSW team in what was known as the Tooheys International Solo Challenge. Led by captain Rinat Mardanshin, Oleg Kurguskin, the late Rif Saitgareev, and runner up in the 1990 Under-21 World Championship Rene Aas, it was the Soviet's first defeat on their 1990/91 Australian tour as they came up against a NSW lineup including Newcastle's own 1990 World #3 Todd Wiltshire, as well as that season's Australian Solo Champion Craig Boyce and 1989 Australia #2 Stephen Davies. Despite being undefeated on their Australian tour to that point after meetings in North Queensland and the Northern Territory, the Russians were expected to lose heavily to the almost test strength NSW but were in the challenge right up until the final heat of the night when Wiltshire and Boyce shut out Kurguskin and Saitgareev 5–1 to give NSW a hard-fought 49–41 win in trying (damp) conditions.

Other famous competitors to race at the Motordrome during its life included World of Outlaws legend Steve Kinser of the USA, his brother Randy and cousin Mark, Indianapolis 500 winner Johnny Rutherford, as well as Australian speedway legends Bernie Whalan Garry Rush, George Tatnell and his son, Brooke Tatnell, Max Dumesny, Steve Brazier and his son Garry Brazier, brothers Ron and John Pyne from nearby Kurri Kurri, Grenville Anderson, Billy Sanders, Phil Crump and Leigh Adams.

The Newcastle Motordrome, originally known as the Jerilderie Park Speedway, was also known during its lifetime as the Newcastle International Motordrome. Due to sponsorship the venue was also known as the Winfield Newcastle Motordrome and finally the Wynn's Newcastle Motordrome.

In a sport where death or severe injury is often an accepted risk (especially to the motorcycle racers), the Newcastle Motordrome bucked the trend and never saw a fatal accident, though in 1975, when the speedway was still Jerilderie Park, it was where the career of the 1954 and 1959 Speedway World Champion Ronnie Moore of New Zealand ended when he crashed and was in a coma for several weeks after.

The speedway held its last meeting on Sunday 14 July 2002 after promoter David Lander sold the freehold for the site for a reported A$2.5 million to the ATB Morton development group ending 25 years of successful speedway at the venue.

== Famous competitors ==
Some of the famous competitors who raced at the Newcastle Motordrome include:

- Rene Aas ( (Soviet Union) ) (Solo)
- Leigh Adams ( (Australia) ) (Solo)
- Grenville Anderson ( (Australia) ) (Super Sedan/Grand National)†
- Bob Blacklaw ( (Australia) ) (Sprintcar)
- John Boulger ( (Australia) ) (Solo)
- Craig Boyce ( (Australia) ) (Solo)
- Steve Brazier ( (Australia) ) (Super Modified/Sprintcar)
- Barry Briggs ( (New Zealand) ) (Solo)
- Kenny Carter ( (England) ) (Solo)
- Peter Collins ( (England) ) (Solo)
- Rodney Combs ( (United States) ) (Super Sedan/Grand National)
- Jason Crump ( (Australia) ) (Solo)
- Phil Crump ( (Australia) ) (Solo)
- Glenn Doyle ( (Australia) ) (Solo)
- Max Dumesny ( (Australia) ) (Formula 500/Sprintcar)
- Sam Ermolenko ( (United States) ) (Solo)
- Ove Fundin ( (Sweden) ) (Solo)
- Per Jonsson ( (Sweden) ) (Solo)
- Mel Kenyon ( (United States) ) (Speedcar)
- Steve Kinser ( (United States) ) (Sprintcar)
- Oleg Kurguskin ( (Soviet Union) ) (Solo)
- Rinat Mardanshin ( (Soviet Union) ) (Solo)
- Ivan Mauger ( (New Zealand) ) (Solo)
- Gary Moon ( (Australia) ) (Sidecar)
- Shawn Moran ( (United States) ) (Solo)
- Hans Nielsen ( (Denmark) ) (Solo)
- Ole Olsen ( (Denmark) ) (Solo)
- Shane Parker ( (Australia) ) (Solo)
- Bruce Penhall ( (United States) ) (Solo)
- Zenon Plech ( (Poland) ) (Solo)
- Mick Poole ( (Australia) ) (Solo)
- John Pyne ( (Australia) ) (Super Sedan/Grand National)
- Ron Pyne ( (Australia) ) (Super Sedan/Grand National)
- Mick Markham (AUS) (superSedan/Hotrods/Spintcars)†
- Bob Brewer (AUS) (Super Sedan)
- Tony Rickardsson ( (Sweden) ) (Solo)
- Garry Rush ( (Australia) ) (Super Modified/Speedcar/Sprintcar)
- Johnny Rutherford ( (United States) ) (Speedcar)
- Rif Saitgareev ( (Soviet Union) ) (Solo) †
- Billy Sanders ( (Australia) ) (Solo) †
- Bobby Schwartz ( (United States) ) (Solo)
- Mitch Shirra ( (New Zealand) ) (Solo)
- Michail Starostin ( (Soviet Union) ) (Solo)
- Brooke Tatnell ( (Australia) ) (Sprintcar)
- George Tatnell ( (Australia) ) (Sprintcar/Speedcar) †
- Darrin Treloar ( (Australia) ) (Sidecar)
- Ron "Sleepy" Tripp ( (United States) ) (Speedcar)
- Bob Tunks ( (Australia) ) (Sprintcar)
- Simon Wigg ( (England) ) (Solo)
- "Big" Ed Wilbur ( (United States) ) (Super Sedan/Grand National)
- Todd Wiltshire ( (Australia) ) (Solo)

† – Deceased
