= Jac Haudenschild =

American automobile racing driver

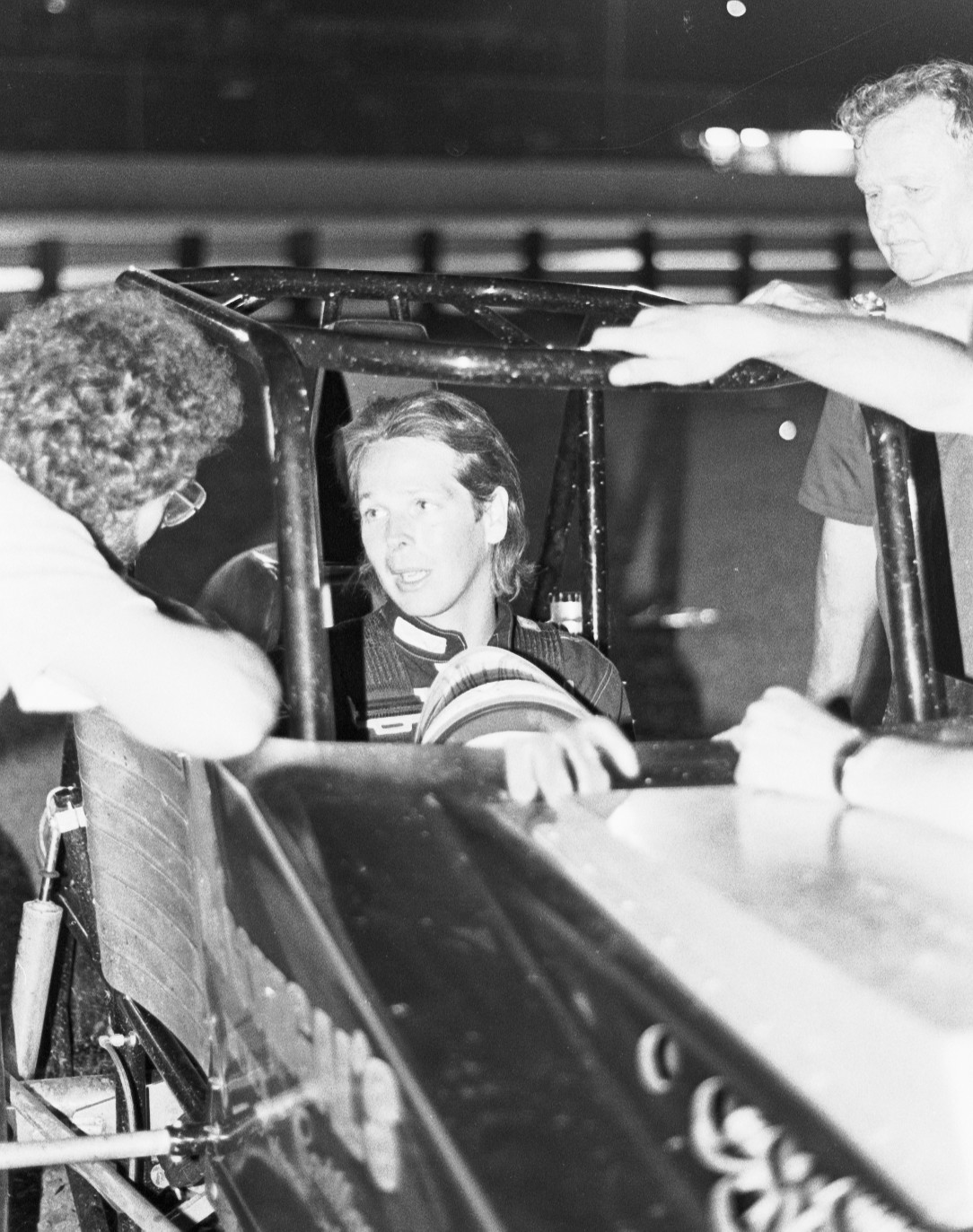
Haudenschild talking with his pit crew

Jac Haudenschild (born April 7, 1958) is an American racing driver. Nicknamed "The Wild Child" for his daring driving style, he is most famous for driving winged sprint cars with the World of Outlaws.

== Early life ==
Haudenschild was born in Wooster, Ohio in 1958. He grew up watching his father John (and later his brother Ed) race modifieds and sprint cars.

== Racing career ==
Haudenschild has accumulated over 300 wins in more than 40 years behind the wheel, including 72 with the World of Outlaws (11th all-time in that series) and six with the USAC Sprint Car series. His best points finish with the World of Outlaws was second in 1995, finishing only 142 points behind Dave Blaney. He is one of only four drivers to have won both World of Outlaws and USAC races at Eldora Speedway.

=== 1970s ===
Haudenschild began racing sprint cars at the age of 15 in 1974 at tracks near his hometown of Wooster, Ohio. His first sprint car win came in his sophomore season in 1975 at Lakeville Speedway.

=== 1980s ===
Haudenschild's first ever non-wing sprint car win came in 1981 at Lawrenceburg Speedway, driving for car owner Bob Hampshire. That same year, he won the Grand Annual Sprintcar Classic, the largest sprint car race in Australia.

In 1982, Haudenschild won 30 A-main features with Bob Hampshire, and got his first opportunity to drive for a major, sponsored team in the Gambler house car owned by C. K. Spurlock and sponsored by Kenny Rogers. He went on to repeat as winner of the Grand Annual Sprintcar Classic that year.

Haudenschild nabbed his first major win in the United States in 1987 at the Kings Royal at Eldora Speedway.

=== 1990s ===
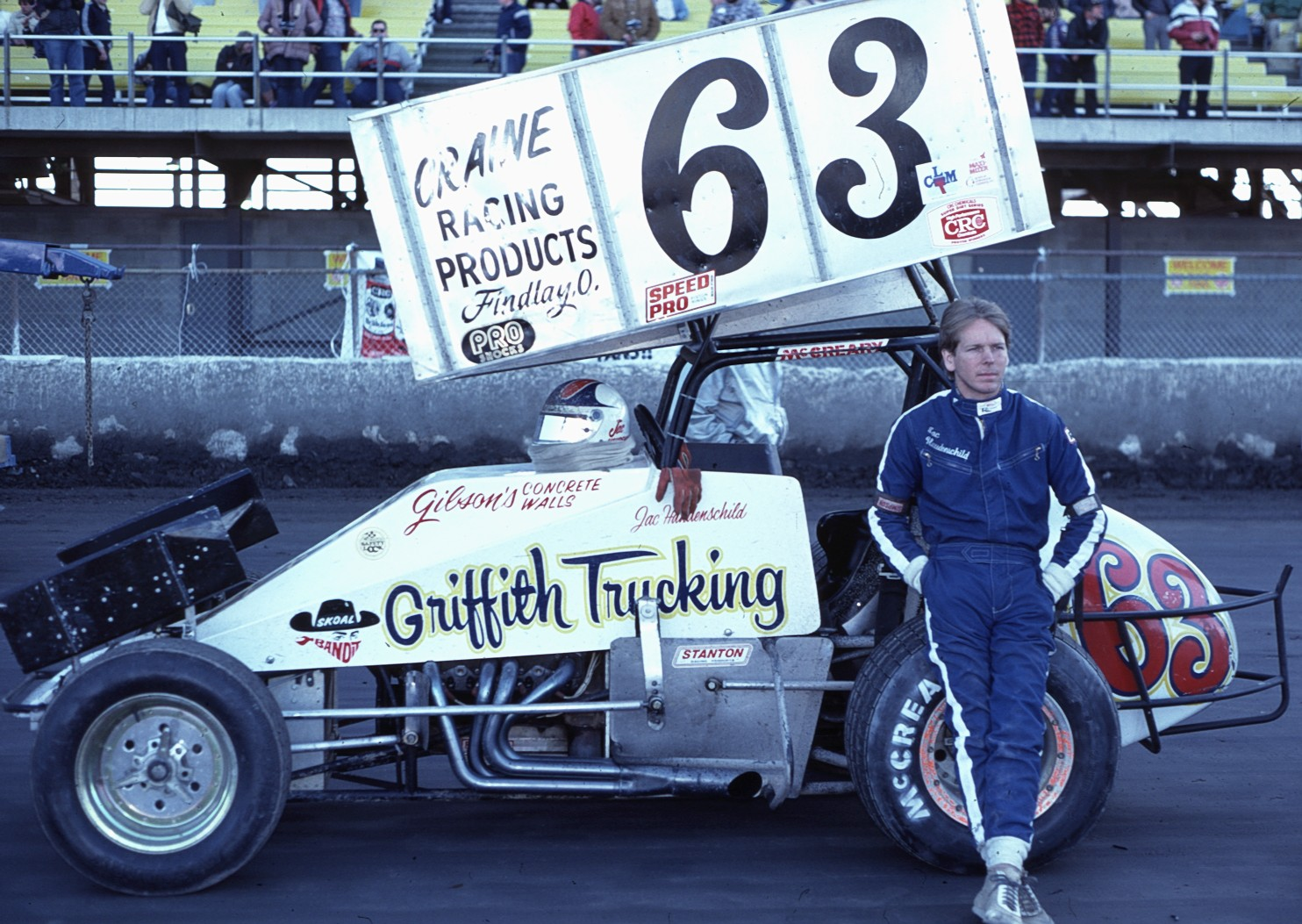
Haudenschild standing beside his sprint car at the Syracuse Mile

Haudenschild spent much of the '90s driving for car owner Jack Elden, with whom he would achieve some of his biggest wins. In 1993, he joined Elden to drive the famous Pennzoil #22. That year, Haudenschild captured the inaugural $100,000-to-win Historical Big One race at Eldora Speedway. He would go on to win the Kings Royal two more times in the Elden #22 in 1994 and 1998, and followed that up with Gold Cup wins at Silver Dollar Speedway in 1998 and 1999, as well as the $50,000-to-win Front Row Challenge as Oskaloosa Speedway in 1999.

=== 2000s ===
Haudenschild's richest win came in 2003 at the Mopar Million at Eldora Speedway. Driving for car owner Larry Woodward, Haudenschild beat 138 other non-wing sprint car drivers to take the $200,000-to-win payout. The race featured a million dollar purse and included ten heats and six features, beginning with an F-main.

2008 brought a third $50,000 Gold Cup win in a season where Haudenschild claimed his 50th World of Outlaws win as well as his first win in Canada at Castrol Raceway.

Since 2008, Haudenschild has driven for a number of car owners including Lon Carnahan, Dennis Roth, Paul Silva, Jamie Miller, Pete Grove, Gus Wasson, Richard Hoffman, and Tom and Sherry Leidig.

Haudenschild retired from driving in 2021 but still attends races as a spectator.

== Awards & Accomplishments ==
- National Sprint Car Hall of Fame, 2009 inductee
- Kings Royal: 1987, 1994, 1998
- Grand Annual Sprintcar Classic: 1981, 1982
- Historical Big One: 1993
- Gold Cup Race of Champions: 1998, 1999, 2008
- Mopar Million: 2003

== Personal life ==
Haudenschild married Patty Sweeney, daughter of Max Sweeney, step-daughter of Bob Hogle, and granddaughter of Tommy Driscoll, in 1992. His son Sheldon is following the family tradition in racing sprint cars, and joined the World of Outlaws series full-time in 2017.
