= Hydraulink War of the Wings =

Dirt track racing series in New Zealand

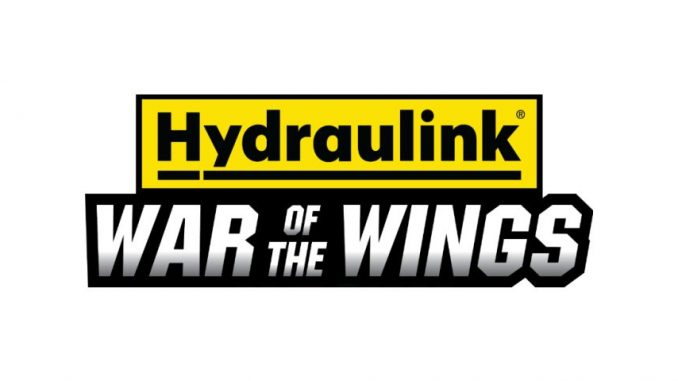
- Category: Dirt track racing
- Country: New Zealand
- Inaugural season: 1997-98
- Tyre suppliers: Hoosier
- Drivers' champion: (New Zealand) Matthew Leversedge
- Teams' champion: (New Zealand) Matthew Leversedge Motorsport
- Official website: https://www.warofthewingssprintcars.co.nz

The Hydraulink War of the Wings (also known as WOW) is a New Zealand based dirt track racing series, with championship rounds held throughout the South Island. Founded in 1997, the tour has grown to become a consistent fixture on the New Zealand Speedway calendar and has attracted numerous drivers from international racing backgrounds. In 2016 and again in 2018 the War of the Wings was the winner of the 'Best Speedway Series' category at the New Zealand Speedway Awards.

== Origins ==
In 1997 Sprint Car Racing in the South Island was in a perilous state. Just a handful of cars could be depended on to 'hit the track'. A group of enthusiasts headed by Brian Barclay, Alistair Kelso and Allan Batt put their energy into forming a 'mini' series that would run at Ruapuna, Dunedin, Ellesmere and Ashburton. Slowly but surely the numbers and enthusiasm grew and in time Cromwell became a destination as did Nelson, Invercargill, Blenheim and Woodford Glen.

There have been a couple of seasons when the War of the Wings has been sidelined, primarily by the cessation of the original South Island Sprint Car Association, and the 2010-11 events fell victim to the Christchurch earthquakes.

In 2007 the Sprint car Association was re-ignited and plans were put in place to 'grow' the series by putting up an irresistible amount of prize and travel incentives.

== Sporting regulations ==
War of the Wings is run at venues licensed by Speedway New Zealand, the major governing body of Speedway in NZ, as well as venues licensed by the Circle Track Racing Association (CTRA).

=== Race day format ===
War of the Wings race day formats go as follows: 30 minutes before racing begins, Time Trials are held to determine the lineups of the heat races along with giving out points for the fastest time. The program then continues as scheduled, with War of the Wings Heat Races 1,2 and 3 mixed in amongst the support classes. Eventually, the meeting generally rounds off with the War of the Wings Feature race.

== Cars ==
The Hydraulink War of the Wings series currently includes the Winged Sprintcar class. This class features a 410ci Engine.

== Tracks ==
War of the Wings tracks
Track	Surface Type	Length	Location	Region	Season(s)	Races held

== Records ==
=== Champions ===
Season
Season	Winner	Race No.	Second Place	Third Place
2025-26	(New Zealand) Matthew Leversedge	78c	(New Zealand) Dyllan Forsey	(New Zealand) Zack Sokol
2024-25	(New Zealand) Connor Rangi	57n	(United States) Joel Myers Jr	(New Zealand) Dyllan Forsey
2023-24	(United States) Joel Myers Jr	46USA	(New Zealand) Connor Rangi	(New Zealand) Dyllan Forsey
2022-23	(United States) Joel Myers Jr	46c	(New Zealand) Matt Anderson	(New Zealand) Jacob McIntyre
2021-22	(New Zealand) Connor Rangi	57n	(New Zealand) Stephen Taylor	(New Zealand) Steve Duff Jr
2020-21	(New Zealand) Jamie Duff	19c	(New Zealand) Connor Rangi	(New Zealand) Caleb Baughan
2019-20	(New Zealand) Caleb Baughan	59c	(New Zealand) Alicia Hill	(New Zealand) Paddy North
2018-19	(New Zealand) Jamie Duff	19t	(New Zealand) Connor Rangi	(New Zealand) Sam O'Callaghan
2017-18	(New Zealand) Jamie Duff	19t	(New Zealand) Connor Rangi	(New Zealand) Daniel Anderson
2016-17	(New Zealand) Jamie Duff	19t	(New Zealand) Matt Honeywell	(New Zealand) Luke Keegan
2015-16 (Note: Woods, Baughan and Honeywell tied on points.)	(Australia) Allan Woods	28aus	(New Zealand) Ray Baughan	(New Zealand) Matt Honeywell
2014-15 (Note: Scott & Sullivan tied on points.)	(New Zealand) Matt Honeywell	64c	(New Zealand) Jason Scott	(New Zealand) Brett Sullivan
2013-14	(New Zealand) Jason Scott	88t	(New Zealand)	(New Zealand)
2012-13	(New Zealand) Ray Baughan	95c	(New Zealand)	(New Zealand)
2011-12	(United States) Barry Martinez	66aus	(New Zealand)	(New Zealand)
2009-10	(New Zealand) Jamie Duff	19t	(New Zealand)	(New Zealand)
2008-09	(New Zealand) Danny Mayson	97c	(New Zealand)	(New Zealand)
2007-08	(New Zealand) Kevin Freeman	75n	(New Zealand)	(New Zealand)
2004-05	(New Zealand) Jeremy Harley		(New Zealand)	(New Zealand)
2003-04	(New Zealand) Kevin Clive	4c	(New Zealand)	(New Zealand)
2002-03	(New Zealand) Kevin Freeman	75n	(New Zealand)	(New Zealand)
2001-02	(New Zealand) Nigel Brown		(New Zealand)	(New Zealand)
2000-01	(New Zealand) Jeremy Harley		(New Zealand)	(New Zealand)
1999-00	(New Zealand) Daryl Wright		(New Zealand)	(New Zealand)
1998-99	(New Zealand) Steve Duff	15c	(New Zealand)	(New Zealand)
1997-98	(New Zealand) Bruce Pluck		(New Zealand)	(New Zealand)

== Hydraulink War of the Wings Wins ==
All figures correct end of 2023-24 season.

Key
**Bold**	Hydraulink War of the Wings Champion

Hydraulink War of the Wings Feature Race Winners
Rank	Country	Driver	Wins	Active
1	New Zealand	**Jamie Duff**	30	2009–present

== Awards and nominations ==
Year	Award	Category	Result
2018	New Zealand Speedway Awards	Series of the Year	Winner
2016	New Zealand Speedway Awards	Series of the Year	Winner
