= Australian Sprintcar Championship =

Dirt track racing competition

The Australian Sprintcar Championship is a dirt track racing championship held each year to determine the Australian national champion for winged sprint car racing. The single championship meeting runs in either late January or early February and has been held each year since the Windsor RSL Speedway in Sydney hosted the first championship in 1963. After the first nine championship meetings were held in New South Wales, the Sprintcar Control Council of Australia (SCCA) now holds the meeting in a different state on a rotational basis, with 1972 seeing the first championship held outside of NSW at the Premier Speedway in Warrnambool, Victoria. The Australian Sprintcar Title is only open to Australian drivers and is run and sanctioned by the SCCA.

Traditionally it was the most prestigious race in Australia to become the country's national champion, as it is restricted to Australian drivers only. However, the race has lost its prestige even to locals because of its closed status of domestic drivers only, compared to major national championships in tennis, golf, and speedcars, which are open to internationals. In 1984, Garry Rush said the Grand Annual Sprintcar Classic, founded in 1973, had surpassed the Australian Championship because it was a "national open" because of his rivalry with international drivers Danny Smith of Indiana (which Rush won seven Grand Annuals to six by Smith) and Jac Haudenschild of Ohio (who won two Grand Annuals) in the Grand Annual, while neither Smith nor Haudenschild could participate in the Australian Championship.

I don’t think I’ve made any secret of the fact that I regard (The Grand Annual) as the most important on the sprint car calendar. It brings greater satisfaction than winning the national title.

In addition, two races founded in 2024 have gained increasing exposure to sprintcar racing in Australia, the invitation-only NAPA Sprintcars in the City, held in Adelaide, South Australia during the Supercars Adelaide Grand Final, and the high-paying High Limit Racing International: Perth in Western Australia, an open race held days after Boxing Day. Both races also feature domestic drivers and those from New Zealand, United States, and Canada, establishing a higher sense of prestige because of visiting international stars. The Adelaide race, Grand Annual, and High Limit Perth pay more than the Australian Championship in addition to being open to non-Australian drivers.

== History ==
The championship has gone by different names over its 52 years as in that time Sprintcars have evolved from crude modified 'hot rods' to the dual winged, 410 cubic inch engined cars of today. The majority of race cars and engines are imported from the US, although some local chassis builders still exist. Sprintcars themselves are modular, with many combinations of chassis and engine possible. Equipment is highly specialised. Wheels, suspension, wings, drive train and fuel tank all bolt to a chassis.

From 1963 to 1964 the title was known as the Australian Sportsman Hot rod Championship. In 1965 this changed to the Australian Hot Rod Championship. This was again changed in 1966 to the National Super Modified Championship but the 1965 name re-appeared in 1967. From 1968 to 1970 the meeting was known as the Australian Super Modified Championship while from 1971 to 1978 the title was then called the Australian Modified Sprintcar Championship before changing one more time in 1979 to its current name, the Australian Sprintcar Championship.

The Australian championship, along with the Grand Annual Sprintcar Classic held exclusively at Warrnambool's Premier Speedway, are seen the two most prestigious single Sprintcar meetings on the Australian speedway calendar. Another prestigious race is the Australian Sprintcar Grand Prix held annually at the Sydney Speedway, and the High Limit Racing International at the Perth Motorplex in Kwinana Beach, Western Australia, which is Australia's highest paying motorsport event at 110,000 AUD for the winner.

The championship is separate to Australia's national Sprintcar series, the World Series Sprintcars which has been running since 1987. Unique restrictions apply to the Australian Championship. Only Australian residents and citizens are eligible to participate; foreign drivers are not eligible to participate in this event, which led to Garry Rush's reference how the Grand Annual has surpassed the Australian Championship, owing to its status as the national open.

Retired Sydney based driver Garry Rush holds the record with ten Australian championship wins and 18 podium finishes between 1966 and 1998. New South Wales based drivers have dominated the title with 36 wins from 52 championships. Six drivers were from Victoria, three each from South Australia and Western Australia, two winners have been from Queensland, and one from Tasmania.

While many successful Australian Sprintcar drivers started out racing Speedcars, only three drivers have ever won both the Australian Sprintcar Championship and the Australian Speedcar Championship. They being Sydney drivers George Tatnell and Robert Farr, and Adelaide's Phil March. Victorian driver Max Dumesny, who won the championship in 1991, 1998 and 2002, was also the Australian Formula 500 Champion in 1981 and 1983, and is the only driver to achieve the Formula 500-Sprintcar double. Dumesny is also the son-in-law of former racer Sid Moore, having married Moore's daughter, Melinda, herself a former Sprintcar driver, in 1992.

On 25–28 January 2012 Speedway City in Adelaide hosted the 50th Anniversary Australian Sprintcar Championship. Sydney driver Brooke Tatnell won his 5th Australian championship and repeated the feat of his late father George Tatnell who won his only Australian Sprintcar Title at the track in 1988 (the 1988 meeting was also the younger Tatnell's first appearance in the championship at just 16 years of age). George and Brooke Tatnell are one of only two father-son combinations to win the championship, the other being Sydney's Steve and Garry Brazier

The 2014 Australian Champion was former Tasmanian driver David Murcott who won his first national championship after finishing third in 2012 and second in 2013. The 2014 championship was held at the Latrobe Speedway in Latrobe, Tasmania. Murcott, who is based in Victoria, became the first Tasmanian driver to win the Australian Sprintcar Championship.

The 2015-16 Australian championship was held at the Premier Speedway in Warrnambool, Victoria on 29–31 January 2016. Sydney's Kerry Madsen won his second Australian title (having won his first also in Warrnambool in 2003) from Brooke Tatnell with Jamie Veal finishing 3rd.

== Winners since 1963 ==
Year	Venue	City/State	Winner	Runner-up	3rd place
1963	Windsor RSL Speedway	Sydney, NSW	Bill Willis (Vic)	Ray Forrest (NSW)	Graeme McCubbin (Vic)
1964	Windsor RSL Speedway	Sydney, NSW	Dick Briton (NSW)	Bill Willis (Vic)	George Polley (NSW)
1965	Windsor RSL Speedway	Sydney, NSW	Bill Warner (NSW)	Dick Briton (NSW)	Graeme McCubbin (Vic)
1966	Westmead Speedway	Sydney, NSW	Dick Briton (NSW)	Bill Warner (NSW)	Garry Rush (NSW)
1967	Westmead Speedway	Sydney, NSW	Dick Briton (NSW)	Garry Rush (NSW)	Ray Brett (NSW)
1968	Sydney Showground Speedway	Sydney, NSW	Bob Tunks (NSW)	Ray Brett (NSW)	Tony Ward (NSW)
1969	Morisset Speedway	Morisset, NSW	Jim Winterbottom (NSW)	Ray Skipper (SA)	Peter Dickerson (NSW)
Year	Venue	City/State	Winners	Runner-up	3rd place
1970	Morisset Speedway	Morisset, NSW	Bill Wigzell (SA)	David Lander (NSW)	Les Harrower (Vic)
1971	Sydney Showground Speedway	Sydney, NSW	Dick Briton (NSW)	Joe Scruise (NSW)	Les Harrower (Vic)
1972	Premier Speedway	Warrnambool, Vic	Graeme McCubbin (Vic)	Phil Hereen (SA)	Wayne Fisher (NSW)
1973	Rowley Park Speedway	Adelaide, SA	John Moyle (SA)	Allan Jones (SA)	Ron Clark (Vic)
1974	Fraser Park Speedway	Canberra, ACT	Jim Winterbottom (NSW)	Les Harrower (Vic)	Ron Smith (Vic)
1975	Brisbane Exhibition Ground	Brisbane, Qld	Dick Briton (NSW)	Graeme McCubbin (Vic)	Garry Rush (NSW)
1976	Latrobe Speedway	Latrobe, Tas	Noel Bradford (WA)	Graeme McCubbin (Vic)	David Conlin (Vic)
1977	Bunbury Speedway	Bunbury, WA	Garry Rush (NSW)	Noel Bradford (WA)	George Tatnell (NSW)
1978	Parramatta City Raceway	Sydney, NSW	Garry Rush (NSW)	Jimmy Sills ( (United States) )	Steve Brazier (NSW)
1979	Premier Speedway	Warrnambool, Vic	Steve Brazier (NSW)	Bill Wigzell (SA)	Tim Moncrieff (Tas)
Year	Venue	City/State	Winners	Runner-up	3rd place
1980	Speedway Park	Virginia, SA	Steve Brazier (NSW)	Alf Barbagallo (WA)	Graeme McCubbin (Vic)
1981	Brisbane Exhibition Ground	Brisbane, Qld	Garry Rush (NSW)	Bill Barrows (SA)	Dick Briton (NSW)
1982	Tralee Speedway	Canberra, ACT	Garry Rush (NSW)	Bob Kelly (QLD)	Ian Sams (NSW)
1983	Newcastle Motordrome	Newcastle, NSW	Garry Rush (NSW)	Brett Lacey (Vic)	Ray Lacey (Vic)
1984	Rockhampton Speedway	Rockhampton, Qld	Garry Rush (NSW)	George Tatnell (NSW)	John Walsh (NSW)
1985	Claremont Speedway	Perth, WA	Ron Krikke (WA)	Lee Foster (WA)	Max Dumesny (Vic)
1986; Jan	Premier Speedway	Warrnambool, Vic	Garry Rush (NSW)	Bob Tunks (NSW)	Ian Lewis (Vic)
1987 Nov 1986	Northline Speedway	Darwin, NT	Brett Lacey (Vic)	Steve Brazier (NSW)	Garry Rush (NSW)
1988	Speedway Park	Virginia, SA	George Tatnell (NSW)	Garry Rush (NSW)	Max Dumesny (Vic)
1989	Tralee Speedway	Canberra, ACT	Garry Rush (NSW)	George Tatnell (NSW)	Brett Lacey (Vic)
Year	Venue	City/State	Winners	Runner-up	3rd place
1990	Archerfield Speedway	Brisbane, Qld	Garry Rush (NSW)	Max Dumesny (Vic)	George Tatnell (NSW)
1991	Carrick Speedway	Carrick, Tas	Max Dumesny (Vic)	David Anderson (Vic)	Brooke Tatnell (NSW)
1992	Parramatta City Raceway	Sydney, NSW	Garry Rush (NSW)	Max Dumesny (Vic)	Rod Bowen (NSW)
1993	Claremont Speedway	Perth, WA	Ron Krikke (WA)	Garry Brazier (NSW)	Mark Wells (WA)
1994	Premier Speedway	Warrnambool, Vic	Garry Brazier (NSW)	Brooke Tatnell (NSW)	Robert Farr (NSW)
1995	Borderline Speedway	Mount Gambier, SA	Garry Brazier (NSW)	Brooke Tatnell (NSW)	Garry Rush (NSW)
1996	Archerfield Speedway	Brisbane, Qld	Todd Wanless (Qld)	Paul Lindberg (Qld)	Garry Rush (NSW)
1997	Parramatta City Raceway	Sydney, NSW	Garry Brazier (NSW)	Kerry Madsen (NSW)	Peter Murphy (NSW)
1998	Bunbury Speedway	Bunbury, WA	Max Dumesny (Vic)	Garry Rush (NSW)	Skip Jackson (NSW)
1999	Premier Speedway	Warrnambool, Vic	Phil March (SA)	Kerry Madsen (NSW)	Max Dumesny (Vic)
Year	Venue	City/State	Winners	Runner-up	3rd place
2000	Speedway Park	Virginia, SA	Garry Brazier (NSW)	Max Dumesny (Vic)	Nathan MacDonald (Qld)
2001	Brisbane International Raceway	Brisbane, Qld	Skip Jackson (NSW)	Garry Brazier (NSW)	Max Dumesny (Vic)
2002	Parramatta City Raceway	Sydney, NSW	Max Dumesny (Vic)	Robert Farr (NSW)	Brooke Tatnell (NSW)
2003	Premier Speedway	Warrnambool, Vic	Kerry Madsen (NSW)	Garry Brazier (NSW)	Brooke Tatnell (NSW)
2004	Bunbury Speedway	Bunbury, WA	Robert Farr (NSW)	Max Dumesny (Vic)	Mark Wells (WA)
2005	Riverview Speedway	Murray Bridge, SA	Brooke Tatnell (NSW)	Ryan Farrell (WA)	Cameron Gessner (Qld)
2006	Brisbane International Raceway	Brisbane, Qld	Brooke Tatnell (NSW)	Max Dumesny (Vic)	Cameron Gessner (Qld)
2007	Latrobe Speedway	Latrobe, Tas	Brooke Tatnell (NSW)	Max Dumesny (Vic)	Robert Farr (NSW)
2008	Parramatta City Raceway	Sydney, NSW	Garry Brazier (NSW)	Robert Farr (NSW)	Ian Loudoun (NSW)
2009	Perth Motorplex	Perth, WA	Garry Brazier (NSW)	Trevor Green (SA)	Ryan Farrell (WA)
Year	Venue	City/State	Winners	Runner-up	3rd place
2010	Northline Speedway	Darwin, NT	James McFadden (NT)	Stephen Bell (Vic)	Jamie Maiolo (WA)
2011	Premier Speedway	Warrnambool, Vic	Brooke Tatnell (NSW)	Kerry Madsen (NSW)	Steven Lines (SA)
2012	Speedway City	Virginia, SA	Brooke Tatnell (NSW)	Shaun Dobson (Tas)	David Murcott (Tas)
2013	Brisbane International Raceway	Brisbane, Qld	James McFadden (NT)	David Murcott (Tas)	Steven Lines (SA)
2014	Latrobe Speedway	Latrobe, Tas	David Murcott (Tas)	Robert Farr (NSW)	Trevor Green (SA)
2015	Bunbury Speedway	Bunbury, WA	David Murcott (Tas)	Steven Lines (SA)	Jamie Veal (Vic)
2016	Premier Speedway	Warrnambool, Vic	Kerry Madsen (NSW)	Brooke Tatnell (NSW)	Jamie Veal (Vic)
2017	Valvoline Raceway	Sydney, NSW	Kerry Madsen (NSW)	Ian Madsen (NSW)	Robert Farr (NSW)
2018	Borderline Speedway	Mount Gambier, SA	Kerry Madsen (NSW)	James McFadden (NT)	Matt Egel (SA)
2019	Archerfield Speedway	Brisbane, Qld	Andrew Scheuerle (Qld)	James McFadden (NT)	Jamie Veal (Vic)
Year	Venue	City/State	Winners	Runner-up	3rd place
2020	Gulf Western & Independent Oils Raceway	Latrobe, Tas	Jamie Veal (Vic)	Marcus Dumesny (NSW)	Kerry Madsen (NSW)
2021	Perth Motorplex	Kwinana Beach, WA			
2022	Archerfield Speedway	Brisbane, Qld	Marcus Dumesny (NSW)	Jamie Veal (Vic)	Jock Goodyer (Tas)
2023	Perth Motorplex	Kwinana Beach, WA	Jock Goodyer (Tas)	Lachlan McHugh (Qld)	Callum Williamson (WA)
2024	Premier Speedway	Warrnambool, Vic	Lachlan McHugh (Qld)	Jamie Veal (Vic)	Jock Goodyer (Tas)
2025	Murray Bridge Speedway	Murray Bridge, SA	James Mcfadden (NT)	Lachlan McHugh (Qld)	Kerry Madsen (NSW)
2026 Jan	Borderline Speedway	Mount Gambier, SA	Jock Goodyer (Tas)	James Mcfadden (NT)	Ryan Newton (QLD)
2026/2027 Nov 2026	Toowoomba Speedway	Charlton, QLD			

• The 1987 race was held, and the 2027 race is scheduled, in November of the previous year. The Australian sprint car racing season is legally a July to June calendar because of the nature of the seasons in the Southern Hemisphere, where the summer features international drivers in other races.

== Australian 360 Sprintcar Championship ==
Since the early 2000s, Sprintcar racing in Australia has seen a shift into two divisions. This is down to the different cubic capacity of the engines used. The top division runs 410 cui (6.7 Litre) engines while those who use the smaller 360 cui (6.0 Litre) engines race in their own division. While the two divisions mix at regular track meetings, the 360 Sprintcars have their own state and national championships. Robbie Farr and Jamie Veal are the only drivers to have won both the open and 360 Championships, Farr having won the open championship in 2004 and the 360 championship in 2013 and Veal the 360 championship in 2017 and the open championship in 2020.

The current (2017) Australian Champion is Victoria's Jamie Veal who won the title at the Perth Motorplex in Perth, Western Australia.

=== Winners since 2004 ===
Year	Venue	City/State	Winner	Runner-up	3rd place
2004	Timmis Speedway	Mildura, Vic	Stephen Bell (Vic)	Alan Barlee (Vic)	Tony Moule (ACT)
2005	Timmis Speedway	Mildura, Vic	Not Held		
2006	Murray Bridge Speedway	Murray Bridge, SA	Jamie Cobby (SA)	Darryl Wright (SA)	Carl Downing (WA)
2007	Kalgoorlie International Speedway	Kalgoorlie, WA	Tony Moule (Vic)	Shaun Bradford (WA)	Rob Adley (WA)
2008	Murray Bridge Speedway	Murray Bridge, SA	Ryan Jones (SA)	Stephen Bell (Vic)	Darren Hickman (Vic)
2009	Murray Bridge Speedway	Murray Bridge, SA	Ryan Jones (SA)	Rick Barrand (Vic)	Alan Barlee (NT)
Year	Venue	City/State	Winners	Runner-up	3rd place
2010	Murray Bridge Speedway	Murray Bridge, SA	Alan Barlee (NT)	Darren Hickman (Vic)	Darryl Wright (SA)
2011	Murray Bridge Speedway	Murray Bridge, SA	Ryan Jones (SA)	Michael Lovegrove (SA)	Mark Caruso (SA)
2012	Murray Bridge Speedway	Murray Bridge, SA	Ryan Jones (SA)	Craig Vanderstelt (SA)	Brendan Guerin (SA)
2013	Bunbury Speedway	Bunbury, WA	Robbie Farr (NSW)	Luke Dillon (SA)	Matthew Reed (Vic)
2014	Murray Bridge Speedway	Murray Bridge, SA	Chad Ely (SA)	Daniel Harding (WA)	Mark Caruso (SA)
2015	Northline Speedway	Darwin, NT	Ryan Farrell (WA)	Ben Atkinson (NT)	Shaun Bradford (WA)
2016	Borderline Speedway	Mount Gambier, SA	Luke Dillon (SA)	Matthew Reed (Vic)	Cameron Gessner (WA)
2017	Perth Motorplex	Perth, WA	Jamie Veal (Vic)	Luke Dillon (SA)	Jason Kendrick (WA)

== See also ==
- Motorsport in Australia
