= Australian Formula 500 Championship =

The Australian Formula 500 Championship is an annual dirt track racing championship meeting held in Australia for Formula 500 cars. Formula 500's in Australia evolved from the old TQ's (Three Quarter Speedcar Midget) of the 1950s and 1960s.

The first Australian Championship was held on 28 December 1964 at the Point Pass Speedway and was won by South Australian driver Bob Lane.

A 40 and 50 year reunion for the event was held in November 2004 and 2014.

The current Australian Champion is Liam Williams who won the title at the Gunnedah Speedway in New South Wales.

The championship was known as the Australian TQ Championship from 1964-1976, after which it was renamed the Australian Formula 500 Championship.

The 2017 Australian Championship was held at the Murray Bridge Speedway in Murray Bridge, SA on 17 April and was won by Queensland's Liam Williams who won his 3rd national championship.

== Winners since 1964 ==
Year	Venue	City/State	Winner
1964/65	Point Pass Speedway	Point Pass, SA	Bob Lane (SA)
1965/66	Myrtleford Speedway	Myrtleford, Vic	Kevin Yeomans (Vic)
1966/67	Latrobe Speedway	Latrobe, Tas	Les Redpath (Tas)
1967/68	Carina Speedway	Bundaberg, Qld	Jack Threadgate (NSW)
1968/69	Myrtleford Speedway	Myrtleford, Vic	Bob Haag (Vic)
Year	Venue	City/State	Winner
1969/70	Latrobe Speedway	Latrobe, Tas	Jack Threadgate (NSW)
1970/71	Riverview Speedway	Murray Bridge, SA	Viv Wilks (SA)
1971/72	Premier Speedway	Warrnambool, Vic	Viv Wilks (SA)
1972/73	Latrobe Speedway	Latrobe, Tas	Ken Redpath (Tas)
1973/74	Claremont Speedway	Perth, WA	John Andersson (WA)
1974/75	Carina Speedway	Bundaberg, Qld	John Andersson (WA)
1975/76	Heddon Greta Speedway	Kurri Kurri, NSW	Ken Nielson (WA)
1976/77	Riverview Speedway	Murray Bridge, SA	John Andersson (WA)
1977/78	Arunga Park Speedway	Alice Springs, NT	George Higgs (WA)
1978/79	Fraser Park Speedway	Canberra, ACT	William Broadwood (WA)
Year	Venue	City/State	Winner
1979/80	Western International Raceway	Melbourne, Vic	Max Dumesny (Vic)
1980/81	Hobart Speedway	Bridgewater, Tas	LLoyd Thornley (NSW)
1981/82	Bibra Lake Speedway	Perth, WA	Max Dumesny (Vic)
1982/83	Archerfield Speedway	Brisbane, Qld	LLoyd Thornley (NSW)
1983/84	Newcastle Motordrome	Newcastle, NSW	Don Bowey (SA)
1984/85	Riverview Speedway	Murray Bridge, SA	Don Bowey (SA)
1985/86	Arunga Park Speedway	Alice Springs, NT	Vince Chapman (WA)
1986/87	Bibra Lake Speedway	Perth, WA	Vince Chapman (WA)
1987/88	Tralee Speedway	Canberra, ACT	LLoyd Thornley (NSW)
1988/89	Sonic Raceway	Swan Hill, Vic	Clive Baxter (NT)
Year	Venue	City/State	Winner
1989/90	Carrick Speedway	Carrick, Tas	Roy Urpeth (NSW)
1990/91	Cairns International Speedway	Cairns, Qld	Graeme Odger (Qld)
1991/92	Wagga International Speedway	Wagga Wagga, NSW	Michael Pronger (Qld)
1992/93	Riverview Speedway	Murray Bridge, SA	Don Bowey (SA)
1993/94	Arunga Park Speedway	Alice Springs, NT	Don Bowey (SA)
1994/95	Goulburn Speedway	Goulburn, NSW	Tony Pryor (NSW)
1995/96	Western Speedway	Hamilton, Vic	Tony Pryor (NSW)
1996/97	Latrobe Speedway	Latrobe, Tas	Philip Woodberry (Tas)
1997/98	Bunbury Speedway	Bunbury, WA	Trevor Harding (WA)
1998/99	Cairns International Speedway	Cairns, Qld	Luke Dillon (SA)
Year	Venue	City/State	Winner
1999/2000	Newcastle Motordrome	Newcastle, NSW	Luke Dillon (SA)
2000/01	Riverview Speedway	Murray Bridge, SA	Luke Dillon (SA)
2001/02	Arunga Park Speedway	Alice Springs, NT	Jason Loveday (SA)
2002/03	Goulburn Speedway	Goulburn, NSW	Lee Dillon (SA)
2003/04	Premier Speedway	Warrnambool, Vic	Darren Mollenoyux (Vic)
2004/05	Latrobe Speedway	Latrobe, Tas	Matt Brown (WA)
2005/06	Esperance Motor Raceway	Esperance, WA	Ben Devlin (WA)
2006/07	Maryborough Speedway	Maryborough, Qld	Ben McLeod (Vic)
2007/08	Lismore Speedway	Lismore, NSW	Michael Pronger (Qld)
2008/09	Tolmer Speedway	Bordertown, SA	Brock Hallett (Qld)
Year	Venue	City/State	Winner
2009/10	Arunga Park Speedway	Alice Springs, NT	Daniel Harding (WA)
2010/11	Goulburn Speedway	Goulburn, NSW	Liam Williams (Vic)
2011/12	Laang Speedway	Laang, Vic	Jessica Moulden (Vic)
2012/13	Carrick Speedway	Carrick, Tas	Marcus Kelly (Tas)
2013/14	Perth Motorplex Speedway	Kwinana Beach, WA	Brock Hallett (SA)
2014/15	Rockhampton Speedway	Rockhampton, Qld	Dylan Willsher (Vic)
2015/16	Gunnedah speedway	Gunnedah, NSW	Liam Williams (Qld)
2016/17	Riverview Speedway	Murray Bridge, SA	Liam Williams (Qld)

== See also ==
- Motorsport in Australia
- List of Australian motor racing series
