= 1990 NASCAR Christmas 400 =

NASCAR event in Melbourne, Australia

Race details
- Exhibition race in the 1990 NASCAR Winston Cup Series season Race 2 of 6 in the 1991 Victorian Health Australian NASCAR Championships season
- Date: 2 December 1990
- Location: Calder Park Thunderdome in Melbourne, Australia
- Course: Permanent racing facility
- Course length: 1.142 miles (1.801 km)
- Distance: 112 laps, 127.9 mi (201.7 km)

Pole position
Driver	Dick Trickle	Team III Racing

Most laps led
Driver	Terry Labonte	Hagan Racing
- Laps: 89

Winner
No. 94	Terry Labonte	Hagan Racing

The 1990 NASCAR Christmas 400 was a non-championship exhibition NASCAR Winston Cup Series race run at the Calder Park Thunderdome in Melbourne, Australia on 2 December 1990 and the third and final running of the NASCAR Australian Exhibition. The race also counted as the second round of the 1991 Victorian Health Australian NASCAR Championships season. The Australian Exhibition had previously been held twice in 1988, with Neil Bonnett winning the Goodyear NASCAR 500 and Morgan Shepherd winning the NASCAR Christmas 500.

Less NASCAR drivers from the United States competed than in the previous races, although Winston Cup drivers such as Dick Trickle, Terry Labonte, and Ken Schrader competed as well as NASCAR Winston West Series drivers such as Terry Fisher, Ron Esau, and J. C. Danielsen. 24 of the 36 drivers entered were Australia natives, most notably Allan Grice, Max Dumesny, and Terry Byers.

Labonte, driving an Oldsmobile Delta 88 for Hagan Racing, won the race, which was shortened by rain to 112 laps, followed by Schrader in second, Esau in third, Fisher in fourth, and Clay Young in fifth.

== Report ==
=== Background ===
The Thunderdome is a purpose-built 1.801 km (1.119 mi) quad-oval speedway located on the grounds of Calder Park Raceway. It was originally known as the Goodyear Thunderdome to reflect the naming rights sponsorship bought by the Goodyear Tire and Rubber Company. With its "double dogleg" front stretch and the start/finish line located on a straight section rather than the apex of a curve, the Thunderdome is technically a quad-oval in shape, though since its opening it has generally been referred to as a tri-oval. The track, modelled on a scaled down version of the famous Charlotte Motor Speedway, has 24° banking on Turns 1, 2, 3 and 4 while the front stretch is banked at 4° and the back straight at 6°.

==== Entry list ====
No.	Driver	Manufacturer
1	(Australia) Terri Sawyer	Pontiac
2	(United States) Rodney Combs	Oldsmobile
02	(Australia) Neville Harper	Pontiac
3	(Australia) Allan Grice	Holden
5	(Australia) Max Dumesny	Pontiac
05	(United States) Clay Young	Pontiac
6	(Australia) John Lawes	Oldsmobile
7	(Australia) Barry Blake	Buick
8	(Australia) Fred Seery	Holden
9	(United States) J. C. Danielsen	Ford
09	(United States) Terry Fisher	Pontiac
10	(Australia) Nick Girdlestone	Chevrolet
11	(Australia) Robin Best	Ford
12	(United States) Ken Schrader	Ford
14	(Australia) Gene Cook	Chevrolet
16	(Australia) Steve Harrington	Holden
22	(Australia) Barry Graham	Pontiac
23	(Australia) Ian Thomas	Oldsmobile
24	(United States) Dick Trickle	Oldsmobile
26	(Australia) Terry Byers	Pontiac
27	(Australia) Kim Jane	Pontiac
31	(Australia) Craig Lawless	Oldsmobile
36	(United States) Mike Oliver	Ford
43	(Australia) Paul Freestone	Pontiac
55	(Australia) George Elliot	Chevrolet
56	(United States) Ron Esau	Oldsmobile
69	(Australia) Charlie Kovacs	Chevrolet
71	(Australia) Winston Badcock	Pontiac
73	(United States) Phil Barkdoll	Oldsmobile
74	(United States) Mike Potter	Pontiac
77	(Australia) Steve Cosson	Oldsmobile
83	(United States) Jerry Bowers	Ford
86	(Australia) Trevor Oliver	Pontiac
88	(Australia) Tony Howlett	Chevrolet
91	(Australia) Walter Giles	Buick
94	(United States) Terry Labonte	Oldsmobile

== Qualifying ==
Dick Trickle, driving an Oldsmobile Delta 88 for Team III Racing, won the pole for the race. Rodney Combs qualified in second, followed by Terry Labonte, Fred Seery, and Robin Best. 31 drivers would make the field, with five failing to qualify, those being Gene Cook, Barry Graham, Craig Lawless, Winston Badcock, and Trevor Oliver.

=== Top ten qualifiers ===
Grid	#	Driver	Manufacturer
1	24	(United States) Dick Trickle	Oldsmobile
2	2	(United States) Rodney Combs	Oldsmobile
3	94	(United States) Terry Labonte	Oldsmobile
4	8	(Australia) Fred Seery	Holden
5	11	(Australia) Robin Best	Ford
6	12	(United States) Ken Schrader	Ford
7	6	(Australia) John Lawes	Oldsmobile
8	77	(Australia) Steve Cosson	Oldsmobile
9	73	(United States) Phil Barkdoll	Oldsmobile
10	55	(Australia) George Elliot	Chevrolet

== Race results ==
Note: Points statistics are missing and status statistics are incomplete

Fin	St	#	Driver	Manufacturer	Laps	Led	Status
1	3	94	Terry Labonte	Oldsmobile	112	89	Running
2	6	12	Ken Schrader	Ford	112	0	Running
3	19	56	Ron Esau	Oldsmobile	112	0	Running
4	13	09	Terry Fisher	Pontiac	112	0	Running
5	14	05	Clay Young	Pontiac	112	0	Running
6	5	11	Robin Best	Ford	112	0	Running
7	26	23	Ian Thomas	Oldsmobile	112	0	Running
8	9	73	Phil Barkdoll	Oldsmobile	111	0	Running
9	18	5	Max Dumesny	Pontiac	111	0	Running
10	20	26	Terry Byers	Pontiac	111	0	Running
11	29	69	Charlie Kovacs	Chevrolet	111	0	Running
12	31	3	Allan Grice	Holden	111	0	Running
13	8	77	Steve Cosson	Oldsmobile	110	0	Running
14	2	2	Rodney Combs	Oldsmobile	110	15	Running
15	7	6	John Lawes	Oldsmobile	108	0	
16	28	88	Tony Howlett	Chevrolet	105	0	
17	11	36	Mike Oliver	Ford	103	0	
18	21	7	Barry Blake	Buick	101	0	
19	4	8	Fred Seery	Holden	99	0	
20	25	91	Walter Giles	Buick	97	0	
21	23	9	J. C. Danielsen	Ford	93	0	
22	15	83	Jerry Bowers	Ford	92	0	Running
23	22	16	Steve Harrington	Holden	90	0	
24	27	43	Paul Freestone	Pontiac	88	0	
25	1	24	Dick Trickle	Oldsmobile	81	8	Transmission
26	30	02	Neville Harper	Pontic	73	0	
27	10	55	George Elliot	Chevrolet	69	0	
28	24	10	Nick Girdlestone	Chevrolet	58	0	Engine
29	16	74	Mike Potter	Pontiac	52	0	Mechanical
30	17	1	Terri Sawyer	Pontiac	19	0	
31	12	27	Kim Jane	Pontiac	3	0	Engine
