= Tralee Speedway =

Former dirt track racing venue in Jerrabomberra, New South Wales

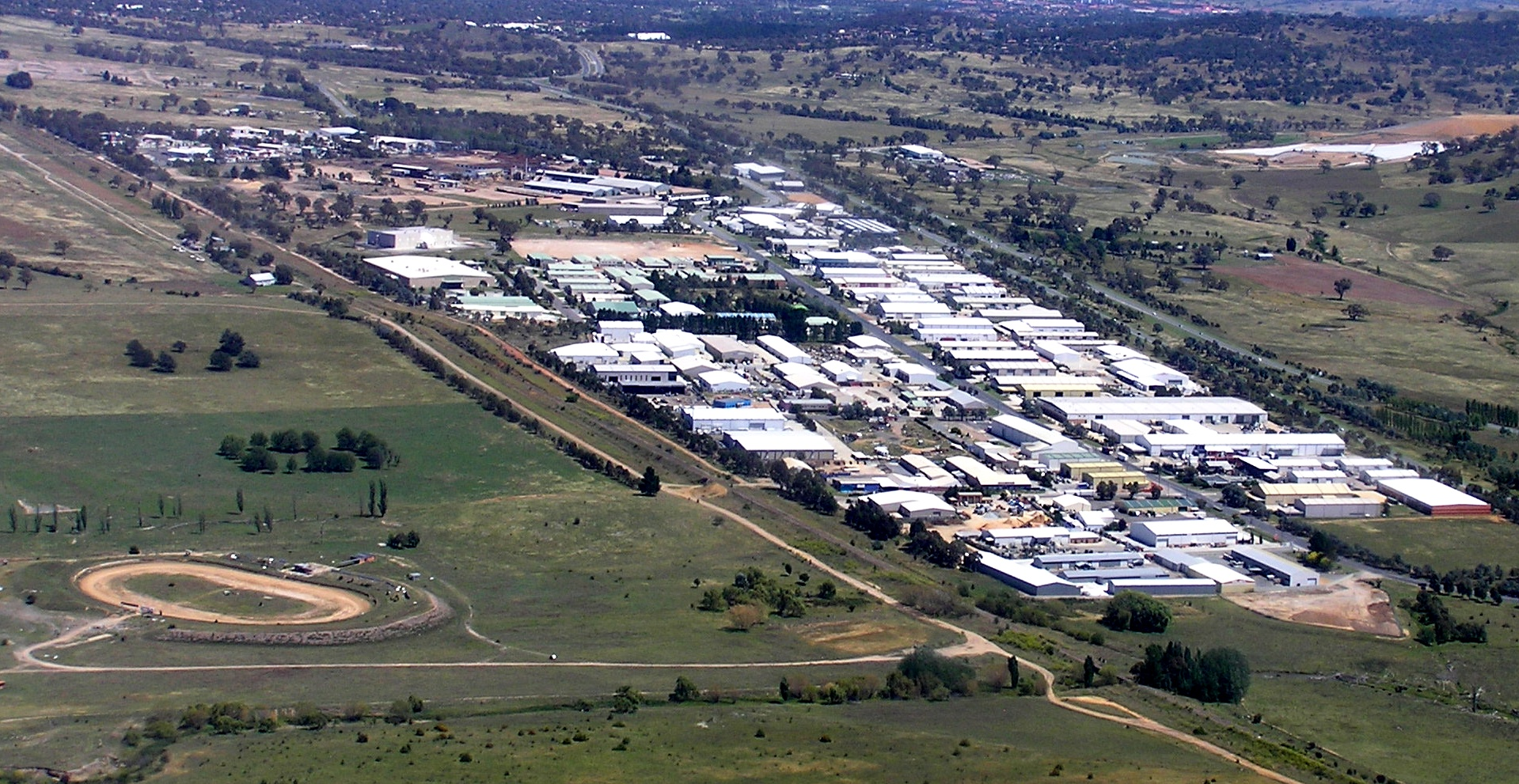
- Aerial view of Hume (ACT) and Tralee Speedway in 2008. The ACT/NSW border runs between Hume and the Speedway
- Location: Jerrabomberra, New South Wales
- Coordinates: 35°23′22″S 149°10′47″E
- Capacity: 10,000
- Opened: 21 June 1970
- Closed: 1997
- Former names: Fraser Park Raceway Pepsi Power Dome
- Major events: Australian Super Sedan Championship (1971-72); Australian Modified Sprintcar Championship (1974); Australian Sprintcar Championship (1982, 1989); Australian Formula 500 Championship (1979, 1988)

Speedway
- Surface: Dolomite and clay mix (1970-1974); Asphalt (1974-1978); Clay (1978-1997)
- Length: 0.254 miles (0.410 km)

Tralee Speedway was a dirt track racing venue located in Jerrabomberra on the New South Wales side of the ACT/NSW border near Canberra, the capital city of Australia.

== History ==
Tralee Speedway opened in 1970 and was a D-shaped oval made of a dolomite and clay mix. Many types of cars raced at Tralee – super modifieds, Sprintcars, Speedcars, three quarter midgets (TQs, later to be named Formula 500s), stock cars, Solos, Sidecars, and productions sedans.

During the 1970s, Tralee Speedway was best known for its high-quality production sedan racing, producing several national and state champions in this category, including Australian champions David House (2 x Australian champion), Dave Wignall and Brian "Stormin" Norman. The speedway holds the distinction of hosting the first ever Australian Super Sedan Championship in 1971–72, won by Kevin Dalton of Victoria from Alan Butcher of Queensland and David House.

In 1974, Tralee staged the Australian Modified Sprintcar Championship. The event was won by Jim Winterbottom (father of V8 Supercars driver Mark Winterbottom) from Victoria's Les Harrower and Ron Smith. By 1979, the title was renamed the Australian Sprintcar Championship and in 1982 was once again held at Tralee Speedway. Legendary Australian Sprintcar driver Garry Rush won the 4th of his 10 national titles from Bob Kelly (Qld) and Ian Samms (NSW). Tralee hosted its final Australian Sprintcar Championship in 1989, With Garry Rush again victorious, winning his 8th national crown from defending champion George Tatnell (NSW) and 1987 national champion Brett Lacey from Victoria.

Many well known drivers from the Liverpool Speedway in Sydney also raced at Tralee including sedan aces Peter Graham, Peter Crick, Bruce Maxwell, Brian Callaghan, Rick Hunter, and super modified stars Gary Rush, Dick Britton, Jim Winterbottom, Steve Brazier, George Tatnell and Sid Hopping. Other notable drivers from this era include Peter Taunton, Howard Revell, brothers Bob and Harry Bink, Ron Shepherd, Bob Rawlings, Max Kennerly, Ken Barlow, John Lange, Roger Emerton, John Forman, Bill Martin (from Cooma) and Bill Martin (from Goulburn).

The USA Sedan teams returned to race for many seasons at Tralee and the "USA vs. Australia" battles were popular with race fans. Another popular visitor was American Sprintcar great Gary Patterson (promoted in Australia as "The Hostile Hippy"), who proved to be unbeatable on nearly every occasion. Other US stars to race at Tralee were Indianapolis 500 winner Johnny Rutherford, 1975 and 1976 USAC National Midget Champion Ron "Sleepy" Tripp, Larry Rice, and Mel Kenyon. Three time Speedway World Champion Ole Olsen from Denmark was a visitor to the speedway.

Mike Clyne's Ford Mustang racing down main straight at Tralee

=== Bitumen and back to clay ===
In the 1974 the track was surfaced with bitumen. This changed the nature of the racing, producing faster lap speeds but less exciting racing. It also restricted the classes of racing that could be held at the speedway, and a motorcycle track was built into the infield so that bikes were still able to run at the speedway. With crowds not as big as hoped, the bitumen was dug up after the 1977/78 season and the track reverted to a clay surface, suitable for cars but still not for bikes which still used the infield track until that was removed in 1980. Following the removal of the infield track, bikes raced on the main track.

To coincide with the change in track surface in 1974, Tralee Speedway was renamed as the Fraser Park Raceway.

The Speedway hosted the ACT Solo Championship on occasions during the 1980s. Future Australian Solo Champion and 1990 World Finalist Todd Wiltshire won his first senior Speedway championships winning the ACT title in 1987 and 1988 at Tralee.

Tralee Speedway also hosted the Australian Formula 500 Championship in both 1979 and 1988. The 1979 event was won by William Broadwood of Western Australia, while NSW driver Lloyd Thorley won his 3rd and last national title at the speedway in 1988.

The Southern corner at Tralee

As a result of many washed-out nights, due to unseasonable rain and noise restrictions imposed after constant complaints from nearby Hume residents, the track closed in 1997.

== Future ==
Today, Tralee Speedway complex is long closed and will be part of a new suburban development.

Speedway in Canberra is now held at the 420 metres (460 yards) ACT Speedway located south east of the Canberra Airport in Fairbairn, though unlike Tralee the ACT Speedway rarely hosts national championship meetings.
