= Bunbury Speedway =

Motorsport venue in Bunbury, Western Australia

- Location: Lot 300 South Western Highway, Bunbury Western Australia
- Coordinates: 33°23′1″S 115°41′0″E
- Capacity: ~10,000
- Operator: Bunbury Car Club
- Opened: 1972

Oval
- Surface: Clay
- Length: 0.530 km (0.329 mi)
- Race lap record: 0:12.958 (Max Dumsney, Max Dumsney Racing, 2004)

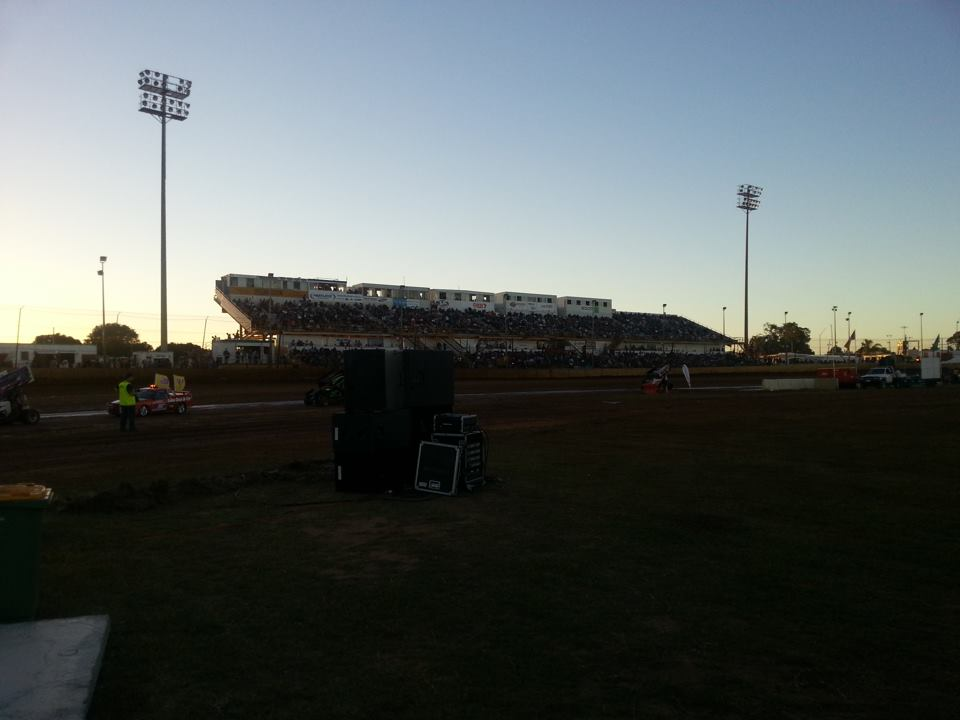
The main straight during a 2014 meeting.

The Bunbury Speedway is a motorsport venue located in Bunbury, Western Australia. It features a 530 metres (580 yards) dirt oval track.

The track is a significant contributor to the sport of speedway in Australia and each year it hosts the Krikke Boys Memorial Race as well as other significant titles including a round of the World Series Sprintcars and the Speedcar Pro Series.

Bunbury has hosted motorcycle speedway, including Round 1 of the 2005/06 Western Australian Solo Championship, as well as the opening rounds of the 1995 and 1996 Australian Speedway Masters Series – both rounds being won by English star Simon Wigg.

Other Australian Speedway Championships held at the speedway include the Australian Sprintcar Championship (1977, 1998, 2004 and 2015), Australian Formula 500 Championship (1998), and the Australian Street Stock Championship in 2004/05.

It is operated by the Bunbury Car Club who built have held the lease on the venue since 1972. The Krikke family are also major contributors to the running of the venue and the promotion of events.

The track has long been a popular venue for local families in the summer months, although in recent years a deterioration in the overall professional appearance and level of investment in facilities has been a topic of conversation. Some have also expressed disappointment at the removal of crowd seating and space for sponsors' corporate boxes.
