= Grand Annual Sprintcar Classic =

Australian sprint car racing event

The Grand Annual Sprintcar Classic is an Australian dirt Sprint car racing meet that takes place at the Sungold Stadium Premier Speedway in Warrnambool, Victoria every year in late January. The classic traditionally takes place one week before the Australian Sprintcar Championship.

The event was first run in 1973 and was won by Ian "Zeke" Agars from Adelaide, who drove a Straight-six Holden-powered supermodified to victory in the 40 lap final.

Sydney racer, ten time Australian champion Garry Rush, has the best record in the event claiming seven victories in an international rivalry with Indiana driver Danny Smith, a six time winner, with Ohio star Jac Haudenschild winning two more during the time. In 1984, Rush noted the Grand Annual has become more prestigious than the Australian Sprintcar Championship because the former is restricted to Australians, while the Grand Annual was open to all comers, which Speed Sport deemed in a 2023 article the sport's "national open" in Australia:

I don’t think I’ve made any secret of the fact that I regard (The Grand Annual) as the most important on the sprint car calendar. It brings greater satisfaction than winning the national title.

Because of its mid-summer date, when the North American season has not started, drivers from the United States will often arrive to race in the December and January races on the Australian Sprintcar Tours. Ten Americans have won the Grand Annual, including Knoxville Nationals winners Danny Lasoski and Donny Schatz, the only two drivers to have won both major races on the calendar. As with the Australian Championship, drivers from New South Wales have dominated the event with 18 wins. The home state of Victoria had to wait until the 20th running of the event to have a home winner with Warrnambool's own Max Dumesny winning in 1992.

The race is regarded as the largest car count in sprint car racing. In the 2015 meeting, 107 cars participated, compared to the previous August's Knoxville Nationals, where 105 cars were entered.

In 2021, the race was billed as 50 for Fifty, as a replacement race for the Grand Annual similar to The One and Only at the Capitani Classic at Knoxville Raceway in Iowa, a replacement for the Knoxville Nationals. Officials cancelled the Grand Annual in name only because of interstate and international travel restrictions. The 50 for Fifty was named for the 50th season of racing at the track, for the Grand Annual's 50 lap distance. It was a Grand Annual without the name.

The race pays $60,000 (AUD) for the win, second only in the 2025-26 season to High Limit International in Perth. The track announced that with sponsorship from The Flying Horse Bar and Brewery, the winner's share will be bumped up the next two years; for 2027, the winner's prize will be $75,000, and in 2028, the race will pay $100,000 to win, the second six-figure winner's cheque in Australian sprintcars.

== Winners since 1973 ==
Year	Winners	Runner-up	3rd place
1973	Zeke Agars (SA)	Gerry Clarke (Tas)	Allan Jones (SA)
1974	Bill Wigzell (SA)	Kevin Yeoman (Vic)	Don Pollock (NSW)
1975	Sid Hopping (NSW)	Graeme McCubbin (Vic)	Bill Wigzell (SA)
1976	Garry Rush (NSW)	Bob Aylesbury (SA)	Steve Brazier (NSW)
1977	Garry Rush (NSW)	Steve Brazier (NSW)	Jimmy Sills (Calif)
1978	Jimmy Sills (Calif)	Les Harrower (Vic)	Steve Brazier (NSW)
1979	Garry Rush (NSW)	Graeme McCubbin (Vic)	Steve Brazier (NSW)
Year	Winners	Runner-up	3rd place
1980	Garry Rush (NSW)	Steve Brazier (NSW)	Graeme McCubbin (Vic)
1981	Jac Haudenschild (Ohio)	Bill Barrows (SA)	Noel Bradford (WA)
1982	Jac Haudenschild (Ohio)	Garry Rush (NSW)	Brett Lacey (Vic)
1983	Danny Smith (Ind)	Garry Rush (NSW)	Jack Hewitt (Ohio)
1984	Garry Rush (NSW)	Danny Smith (Ind)	Bill Barrows (SA)
1985	Danny Smith (Ind)	Garry Rush (NSW)	Sid Moore (NSW)
1986	Garry Rush (NSW)	John Walsh (NSW)	Bill Barrows (SA)
1987	Danny Smith (Ind)	Garry Rush (NSW)	Ian Lewis (Vic)
1988	Danny Smith (Ind)	Garry Rush (NSW)	Max Dumesny (Vic)
1989	Danny Smith (Ind)	Max Dumesny (Vic)	Phil March (SA)
Year	Winners	Runner-up	3rd place
1990	Garry Rush (NSW)	Max Dumesny (Vic)	George Tatnell (NSW)
1991	Jack Hewitt (Ohio)	Danny Smith (Ind)	Max Dumesny (Vic)
1992	Max Dumesny (Vic)	Garry Rush (NSW)	Danny Smith (Ind)
1993	Garry Brazier (NSW)	Garry Rush (NSW)	Max Dumesny (Vic)
1994	Max Dumesny (Vic)	Mike Ward (Tenn)	Garry Rush (NSW)
1995	Brooke Tatnell (NSW)	Max Dumesny (Vic)	Garry Brazier (NSW)
1996	Danny Smith (Ind)	Greg Hodnett (Penn)	Garry Rush (NSW)
1997	Trevor Green (SA)	Skip Jackson (NSW)	Garry Rush (NSW)
1998	Skip Jackson (NSW)	Trevor Green (SA)	Phil March (SA)
1999	Brooke Tatnell (NSW)	Garry Brazier (NSW)	Max Dumesny (Vic)
Year	Winners	Runner-up	3rd place
2000	Danny Lasoski (Mo)	Chad Kemenah (Ohio)	Skip Jackson (NSW)
2001	Donny Schatz (NDak)	Danny Smith (Ind)	Danny Lasoski (Mo)
2002	Donny Schatz (NDak)	Max Dumesny (Vic)	Danny Smith (Ind)
2003	Joey Saldana (Ind)	Max Dumesny (Vic)	Brooke Tatnell (NSW)
2004	Max Dumesny (Vic)	Kerry Madsen (NSW)	Brooke Tatnell (NSW)
2005	Kerry Madsen (NSW)	Shane Stewart (Okla)	Donny Schatz (NDak)
2006	Abandoned after C Main due to Rain. Ben Atkinson (NT) led points after first night.		
2007	Kerry Madsen (NSW)	Brooke Tatnell (NSW)	Shane Stewart (Okla)
2008	Kerry Madsen (NSW)	Jason Johnson (La.)	Max Dumesny (VIC)
2009	Brooke Tatnell (NSW)	Shane Stewart (Okla)	Kerry Madsen (NSW)
Year	Winners	Runner-up	3rd place
2010	Shane Stewart (Okla)	Brooke Tatnell (NSW)	Ryan Farrell (WA)
2011	Steven Lines (SA)	Brooke Tatnell (NSW)	Jason Johnson (La)
2012	Ian Loudoun (NSW)	Craig Dollansky (Minn)	Kerry Madsen (NSW)
2013	Steven Lines (SA)	Terry McCarl (Iowa)	Brooke Tatnell (NSW)
2014	Tim Kaeding (Calif)	Max Dumesny (Vic)	Jamie Veal (Vic)
2015	Kyle Hirst (Calif)	Brooke Tatnell (NSW)	Grant Anderson (NSW)
2016	Jamie Veal (Vic)	Kerry Madsen (NSW)	Robbie Farr (Qld)
2017	James McFadden (Vic)	Darren Mollenoyux (Vic)	Brooke Tatnell (NSW)
2018	Corey McCullagh (Vic)	Carson Macedo (Calif)	Brooke Tatnell (NSW)
2019	Robbie Farr (Qld)	Jamie Veal (Vic)	Kerry Madsen (NSW)
2020	James McFadden (Vic)	Jamie Veal (Vic)	Kerry Madsen (NSW)
2021; 50 for Fifty	James McFadden (Vic)	Jamie Veal (Vic)	Darren Mollenoyux (Vic)
2022	Lachlan Mchugh (Qld)	James McFadden (Vic)	Corey McCullagh (Vic)
2023	Brock Hallett (Qld)	Sheldon Haudenschild (Ohio)	Lachlan Mchugh (Qld)
2024	Aaron Reutzel (Tex)	Brock Hallett (Qld)	Lachlan Mchugh (Qld)
2025	James McFadden (Vic)	Cory Eliason (Calif)	Jamie Veal (Vic)
2026	Aaron Reutzel (Tex)	Lachlan Mchugh (Qld)	Brock Hallett (Qld)

== See also ==
- Sport in Australia
