= Max Dumesny =

Australian professional Sprintcar driver

- Nationality: Australian
- Born: 12 July 1959 (age 67) Nullawarre, Victoria, Australia

World Series Sprintcars career
- Current team: Max Dunesny Motorsport
- Car number: V5
- Best finish: 1st in 1989/90, 1990/91, 1992/93, 2001/02, 2003/04, 2004/05, 2006/07

Previous series
- 1979-1982 1983- 1990-1998 1996: Formula 500 Sprintcars; Australian NASCAR 5.0L Touring cars

Championship titles
- 1980, 1982 1992, 1998, 2001 1992/93: Australian Formula 500 Championship; Australian Sprintcar Championship Australian NASCAR Championship; Victorian Sprintcar Championship; SA Sprintcar Championship; Queensland Sprintcar Championship

Awards
- 1992 1992, 1994, 2004: Australian Speedcar Grand Prix; Grand Annual Sprintcar Classic
- Statistics up to date as of 16 January 2013.

Maxwell Stewart Dumesny (born 12 July 1959, in Nullawarre, Victoria) is an Australian professional Sprintcar driver. Dumesny was born and raised in Victoria but has resided in Nelson, New South Wales since the mid-1990s, although his Sprintcar carries the number V5 (for Victoria #5) that he has used throughout his career, although he has changed that to Australia 1 when he has won both the Australian Formula 500 and Australian Sprintcar Championships.

== Career ==
=== Junior Classes ===
Dumesny started his career on motorbikes and it was generally believed that he would go on to a national scrambles career, but fate intervened on a dark night not far from home when riding his motorcycle he struck a cow that had wandered onto the road.

After recovering from injuries sustained in the crash, Dumesny decided a career on four wheels was probably a safer bet than one on two wheels and he started racing speedway in a Formula 500 at his local track, the Premier Speedway in Warrnambool. He proved to be a sensation on the 1/4-mile speedway and ended up winning the 1980 Australian Formula 500 Championship at the Western International Speedway in Melbourne, and repeating the success in 1982 at the Bibra Lake Speedway in Perth.

=== Sprintcars ===
Dumesny switched to Sprintcars in 1983/84 and had his first major win that season when he won the 1983 Wayne Fisher Memorial at the Parramatta City Raceway in Sydney. In 1984, Dumesny linked with Melbourne based motor and racing expert John Sidney, driving for Sidney's OTR (Oval Track Racing) and started driving an Australian made OTR Defender Sprintcar with instant success, winning both the Victorian and South Australian championships.

Dumesny's record in Sprintcars in Australia is almost second to none. He has won multiple state titles around the country, including eight Victorian championships, as well as the South Australian, New South Wales, and Queensland championships. In 1991, he became the only driver to win the Australian Sprintcar and Australian Formula 500 Championships when he won the Sprintcar title at the Carrick Speedway in Tasmania. He added a second and third national Sprintcar title in 1998 and 2002 respectively. Dumesny is also a seven-time winner of the World Series Sprintcars held in Australia, winning his first championship in 1989/90 while at his former home track in Warrnambool he has won three Grand Annual Sprintcar Classics. Dumesny's win in the 1992 Classic was the first time in the race's then 20-year history that a Victorian driver had won the event. In the years prior to his 1992 win, he had finished third in 1988 and 1991, and second in 1989 and 1990. Dumesny finished second behind American Tim Kaeding in the 2014 Classic.

Dumesny has also won 32 feature races in the Easter Sprintcar Trail, a three event series held annually on the Easter long weekend at the Borderline Speedway in Mount Gambier, South Australia, and various tracks in Victoria, usually the Premier Speedway in Warrnambool, and the Avalon Raceway in Lara near Geelong.

Early in his Sprintcar career, Dumesny also travelled to the United States to race in selected World of Outlaws events as well as the famed Knoxville Nationals. His biggest success overseas came in 1985 when he won the Race of States at the 1985 Knoxville Nationals, becoming the first Australian to win the race. Since then, along with a number of other Australian drivers including his son Mitchell, he has been a regular visitor to Knoxville.

On 16 May 1992, Dumesny continued to show his versatility when he swapped his Sprintcar for a Speedcar and won the 34th Australian Speedcar Grand Prix held at the famous Sydney Showground Speedway joining such drivers as A. J. Foyt, Steve Kinser, Sleepy Tripp, Garry Rush and George Tatnell as winners of the annual event.

=== Sedan Racing ===
Dumesny, his longtime backer John Sidney along with longtime (and current) major sponsor Valvoline (sponsorship secured in 1988) branched out in other forms of motorsport in the early 1990s when Max drove a JSR (John Sidney Racing) prepared Oldsmobile Cutlass in the Australian NASCAR Championship, winning the 1992/93 national championship. He had first competed in NASCAR in 1990 in the NASCAR Christmas 400 at the Calder Park Thunderdome, where he finished ninth. Dumesny would remain competitive in NASCAR, later switching to drive a Chevrolet Monte Carlo. In 2002, he co-drove with Jamie Whincup at the 2002 Queensland 500.

Dumesny also raced a JSR prepared Ford Falcon in the 1996 Australian Touring Car Championship. Dumesny finished the championship in 16th place and also raced the Falcon to 12th place in the 1996 AMP Bathurst 1000 partnered with Kerry Baily from Tasmania.

=== Complete Australian Touring Car results ===
(key) (Races in bold indicate pole position) (Races in italics indicate fastest lap)

Year	Team	Car	1	2	3	4	5	6	7	8	9	10	11	12	13	DC	Points
1996	John Sidney Racing	Ford EF Falcon	ECR	SAN	BAT	SYM	CAL; 14	WIN; Ret	LAK	WAN	MAL; 12	ORA; DNS	SAN; 11	BAT; 12		16th	13
2002	Garry Rogers Motorsport	Holden VX Commodore	ADE	PHI	ECR	HID	CAN	BAR	ORA	WIN	QLD; 20	BAT	SUR	PUK	SAN	63rd	26

== Personal life ==
Dumesny has been married to Melinda since 1986. Melinda Dumesny is the daughter of Australian Sprintcar Driver Sid Moore. Together they have four children (Mitchell, Michaela, Matt & Marcus). Both Melinda and Mitchell Dumesny, like Max, are Sprintcar drivers. Max Dumesny Motorsport also is the official agent of Continental AG's speedway tyre division in Australia. His daughter Michaela is also following the speedway tradition and has raced sprintcars, both with and without wings, before moving to Bloomington, Indiana (United States) to attend Indiana University.

In a 2014 video interview for the Sydney Speedway's YouTube channel, Dumesny confessed that after starting in Formula 500's he thought his career would last "about 5 years" before he got out, got married and had kids who would never know he had raced. By the time of the interview Dumesny had spent over 35 years in the sport and all four of his children now raced speedway.

In 2015, the Speedway Racing Association of Victoria (SRA) granted Life Membership to Dumesny and allocated his racing number "V5" to be only used by a "Dumesny".

== Major wins ==
- World Series Sprintcars - 1989/90, 1990/91, 1992/93, 2001/02, 2003/04, 2004/05, 2006/07
- Australian Sprintcar Championship - 1991, 1998, 2002
- Australian Superspeedway Championship (NASCAR) - 1992/93
- Grand Annual Sprintcar Classic - 1992, 1994, 2004
- Australian Formula 500 Championship - 1980, 1982
- Race of States at the Knoxville Nationals - 1985
- Australian Speedcar Grand Prix - 1992
- Victorian Sprintcar Championship (8 times)
- South Australian Sprintcar Championship - 1984, 1985, 1986, 1989, 1993, 2002
- New South Wales Sprintcar Championship - 1984, 2008, 2014
- Queensland Sprintcar Championship
- Australian Sprintcar Masters
- Australian Sprintcar Stampede
- Easter Sprintcar Trail (32 Feature wins)
- Krikke Boys Shootout - 2004, 2006, 2007

Sporting positions
Preceded by George Elliot	Winner of the Australian NASCAR Championship; 1992–93	Succeeded by Barry Graham
