= Garry Rush =

Australian motor racing driver

Garry Frederick Rush (born July 5, 1944) is a retired Australian professional motor racing driver. Born in the New South Wales town of Camden, he competed in Sprint cars, Speedcars, NASCAR, Formula Ford and Touring cars in a 40 year career. Rush won a record 10 Australian Sprintcar Championships and seven Grand Annual Sprintcar Classics at Premier Speedway, Warrnambool.

== Australian Racing Career ==
Rush started racing near his residence of Auburn, New South Wales in a Stock Rod at Westmead Speedway in 1964. After crashing out of several events, he accepted a drive in a midget speedcar. He moved up to a Super Modified and won the 1966 NSW championship.

In his 28 appearances in the Sprintcar national championships between the years of 1966 and 1998, Rush won ten titles. He was runner-up three times and finished third on five occasions, resulting in finishing on the podium over 64 percent of the time.

== Other Racing ==
Rush raced in a 1988 NASCAR Winston Cup Series exhibition race (the 1988 Goodyear NASCAR 500) at Calder Park Thunderdome in Melbourne, Victoria. Rush competed in several Bathurst 1000, with a best finish of ninth.

Rush spent some time racing Sprintcars and Super Modifieds in the United States. He helped bring some American drivers to race in Australia.

After retiring from racing, Rush became a part-owner Granville Speedway (now Sydney Speedway).

== Halls of Fame ==
Rush was inducted into the Australian Speedway Hall of Fame in 2007 and the Australian Motor Sports Hall of Fame in 2016.
