= Sprint car racing =

Auto racing with small, open-wheel, high-power vehicles

Sprint cars are open-wheel race cars, designed primarily for the purpose of running on short oval, circular dirt or paved tracks. Historically known simply as "big cars," distinguishing them from "midget cars," sprint car racing is popular primarily in the United States and Canada, as well as in Australia, New Zealand, and South Africa.

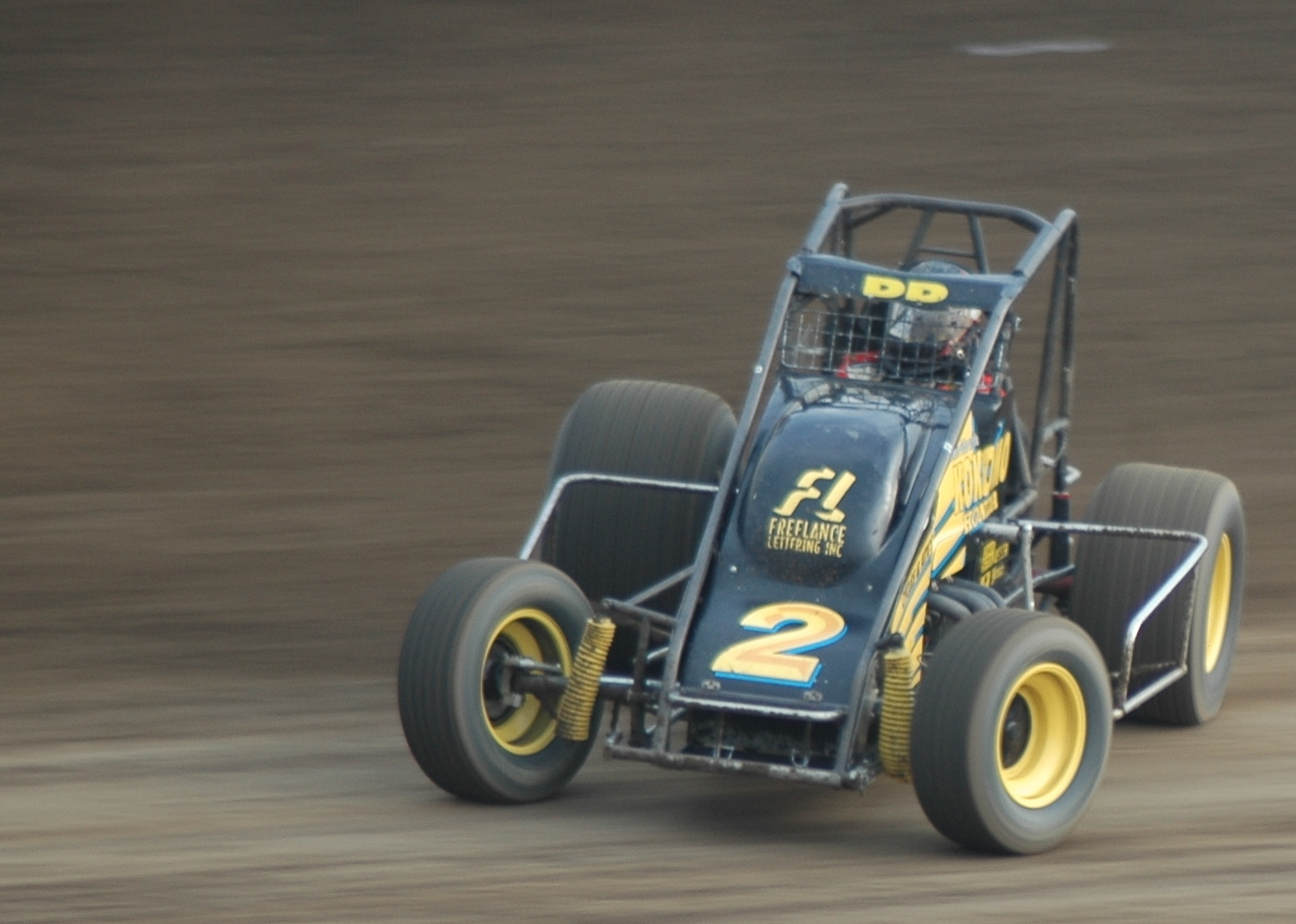
Dave Darland racing at Kokomo Speedway in 2007

Sprint cars have very high power-to-weight ratios, with weights of approximately 1,400 pounds (640 kg) (including the driver) and power outputs of over 900 horsepower (670 kW), which give them a power-to-weight ratio besting that of contemporary F1 cars. Typically, they are powered by a naturally aspirated, methanol-injected overhead valve American V8 engine with a displacement of 410 cu in (6.7 L) and capable of engine speeds of 9000 rpm. Depending on the mechanical setup (engine, gearing, shocks, etc.) and the track layout, these cars can achieve speeds in excess of 160 miles per hour (260 km/h). A lower-budget and very popular class of sprint cars uses 360 cu in (5.9 L) engines that produce up to 775 horsepower. Sprint cars do not utilize a transmission but have an in-or-out gearbox and quick-change rear differentials for occasional gearing changes. As a result, they do not have electric starters (or even electrical systems other than a ignition magneto) and require a push to be started. The safety record of sprint car racing in recent years has been greatly improved by the use of roll cages, and, especially on dirt tracks, wings, which increase surface traction to protect the drivers.

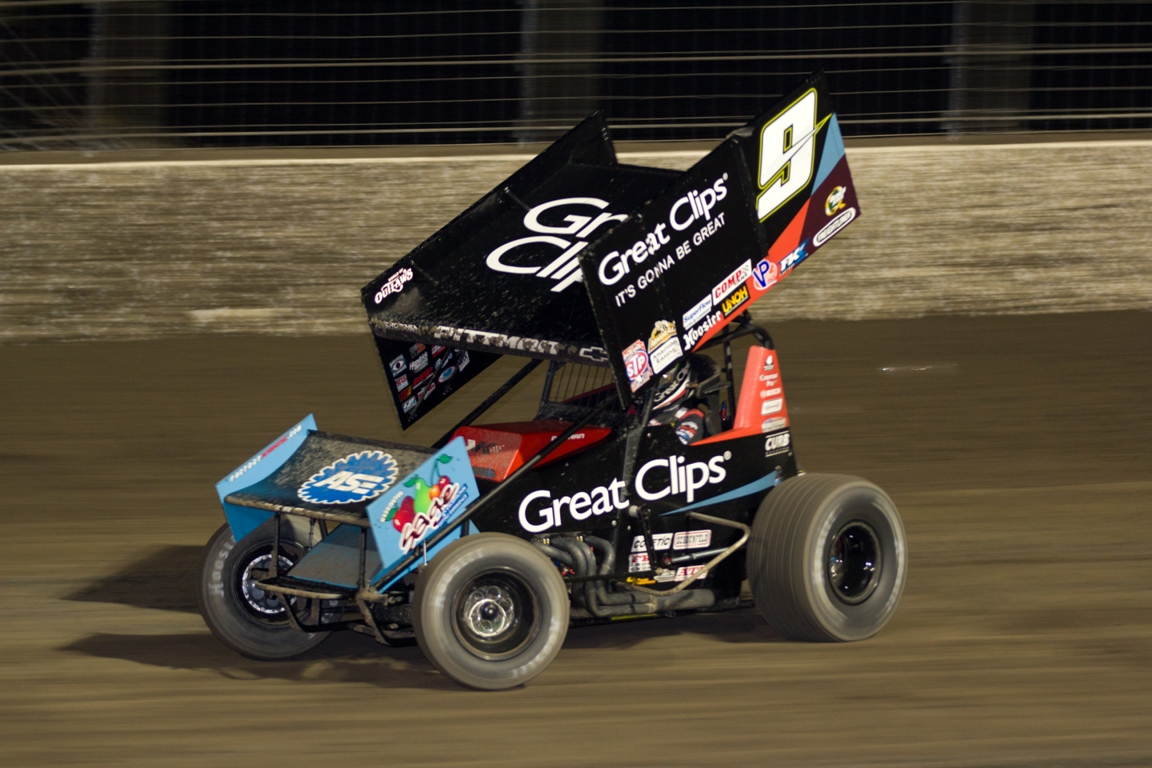
Daryn Pittman's 2013 World of Outlaws winged sprint car

Many IndyCar Series and NASCAR drivers used sprint car racing as an intermediate stepping stone on their way to more high-profile divisions, including Indianapolis 500 winners A. J. Foyt, Mario Andretti, Johnny Rutherford, Parnelli Jones, Johnnie Parsons, Al Unser Sr., and Al Unser Jr., as well as NASCAR Cup Series champions Jeff Gordon, Tony Stewart and Kyle Larson.

The National Sprint Car Hall of Fame & Museum, located in Knoxville, Iowa, features exhibits highlighting the history of both winged and wingless sprint cars.

== Wingless sprint cars ==
There are several sanctioning bodies for wingless sprint cars. The United States Automobile Club (USAC) became the USAC/California Racing Association (USAC/CRA) after taking over the Sprint Car Racing Association (SCRA). The USAC/CRA remains popular on the West Coast, East Coast and in Indiana. However, historical lack of leadership in much of the US has resulted in a large number of groups and sanctioning bodies supporting wingless sprint cars.

Wingless sprint cars are considered the traditional sprint cars, dating back to the first sprint cars in the 1930s and 1940s. Today, traditional and winged sprint cars are essentially the same vehicle, with many wingless cars having "stub outs" in the frame for attaching wings. They generally use the same 410 cubic inches (6,700 cc) and 360 cubic inches (5,900 cc) aluminum engines as their winged counterparts; many local tracks have rules mandating steel blocks and some 305 cubic inches (5,000 cc) displacements, in order to help control costs. Some newer regional groups, specifically POWRi and Elite have chosen to allow open engines with no limit to engine size. Their tuning and gearing are different for performance at lower RPMs than winged cars. Chassis set ups and tires are also different.

While they do not have the same top speed as a winged car because they lack downforce for improved traction, traditional cars are thought by many to be more entertaining to watch. Their relative lack of grip creates different driving characteristics than their winged counterparts, causing them to be more difficult to control through the corners. This, and the lack of roll-over protection a wing provides, makes them more prone to spectacular accidents.

== Winged sprint cars ==
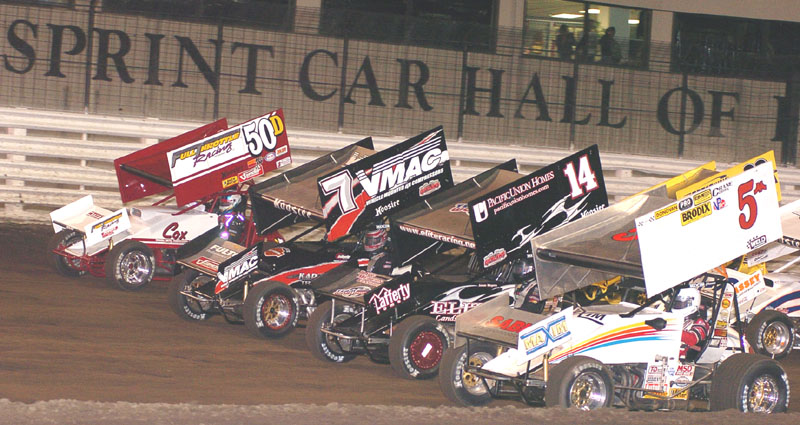
World of Outlaws drivers make a four-abreast lap at the Knoxville Raceway

The world's first small-track winged race car was driven by Jim Cushman at the Columbus Motor Speedway (Ohio) in 1958. Cushman drove with his winged super-modified (wing created by Gene and Floyd Miller) in several races and even won with it, starting a new trend of winged cars in sprint and super-modified racing. By 1959, up to half of the field was racing with a wing at Columbus Motor Speedway. In the early 1970s, many sprint car drivers began to put wings with sideboards on both the front and top of their cars. The added wings increase the downforce generated on the car, with the opposite direction of the sideboards helping to turn the car in the corners. The increased traction makes the car faster and easier to control.

The wing also affects safety. The added downforce lessens the likelihood of going airborne. When cars do go airborne, the wings contact the ground first and break off or crumple upon hitting the ground, lessening the impact on the driver and the car. For these reasons, winged cars are safer to drive. Often teams are able to replace the wing during the ensuing stoppage and are able to continue once the race resumes.

In 1978, Ted Johnson formed the promotional body for winged sprint cars called the World of Outlaws. Racing throughout the United States from February to November, the World of Outlaws is the premier dirt sprint car racing series. Famous tracks featured in the series included the Eldora Speedway in Rossburg, Ohio, the Lernerville Speedway in Sarver, Pennsylvania, the Knoxville Raceway in Knoxville, Iowa and Williams Grove Speedway in Mechanicsburg, Pennsylvania. Each August, the Knoxville Raceway holds the Knoxville Nationals.

In 1987, Australia followed suit with its own national series for winged sprint cars called the World Series Sprintcars, founded by Adelaide based sedan driver and Speedway Park track promoter John Hughes. Famous Australian tracks used in the WSS have included Speedway Park/City in Adelaide, South Australia, Claremont Speedway and later Perth Motorplex in Perth, Western Australia, Valvoline Raceway in Sydney, New South Wales, Archerfield Speedway in Brisbane, Queensland, and the Premier Speedway (home of the Grand Annual Sprintcar Classic) in Warrnambool, Victoria. There is also a single meeting Australian Sprintcar Championship which has been run since 1963 and has been run under various class names before finally settling on the Australian Sprintcar Championship in 1979. While non-Australian drivers are free to race in the WSS and other meetings including the various state championships, only Australian drivers are permitted in the Australian Championship meeting.

The Grand Annual Sprintcar Classic at Warrnambool is the largest sprint car meeting in the world; in the 2014–15 season, the 2015 Classic race outdrew the Knoxville Nationals in entries.

Until the early 2000s, sprint cars in Australia were restricted to 6,200 cc (380 cu in) V8 engines as opposed to the 410 cu in (6.7 L) engines used in the United States and New Zealand. Brian Healey, the Sacramento-based Australian who owned Parramatta City Raceway, pushed for the change in 2003 to follow both nations to 410 cu in (6.7 L). Today, Australia follows the standard 410 cu in (6.7 L) formula, and has both the 410 cu in (6.7 L) and 360 cu in (5.9 L) formulae. Both formulae have separate Australian Championship meetings.

== Midget cars ==
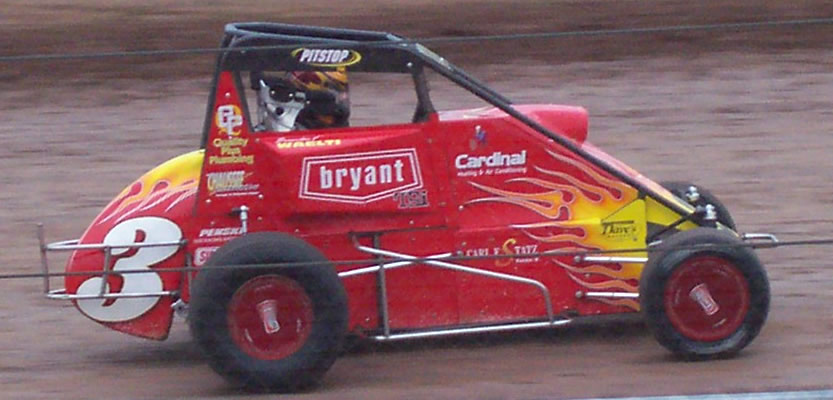
Midget sprint car

Midget cars are smaller versions of a full size sprint car, normally non-wing only. Midgets date back to the 1930s as a very common form of sprint car racing, still very popular today and also sanctioned by USAC, POWRI, and others. They are powered by four-cylinder engines developing around 350 horsepower (260 kW), but are only similar to their larger cousins in appearance.

== Mini sprint ==
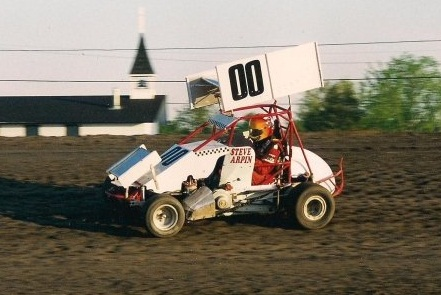
Mini sprint car

Mini sprints are similarly sized to midget cars, but have upright-style chassis and center-mounted, chain-driven four-cylinder motorcycle engines with displacements between 750 and 1200 cc.

== Micro sprints ==
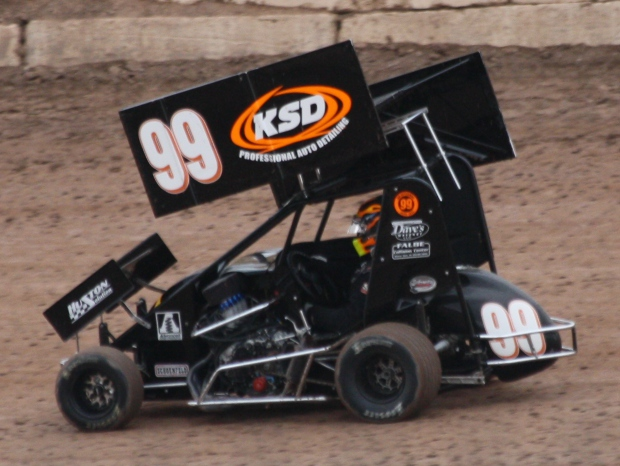
Winged micro sprint

Micro sprints are small racecars that are smaller versions of full sprint cars. A starter class for striving sprint car enthusiasts. 250/270cc single-cylinder two-cycle and 600 cc are the most popular micro sprint classes. They run side-mounted 600 cc motorcycle engines developing around 140 hp and are chain driven. They have chassis and bodies styled like those of full-sized sprint cars or midgets. Micro sprints are generally run on small dirt tracks that are usually a fifth of a mile or less in size, though they sometimes run on larger tracks. They can be either raced with or without wings; the latter are sometimes called "micro midgets" or "600 cc sprints". The general minimum weights for the cars to pass tech is 775 lbs for winged and 725 lbs for non-wing. Micro sprints are generally a cheaper alternative than racing mini sprints or midget sprints, but they can be as expensive as full-sized sprint cars.

== SpeedSTR ==
The SpeedSTR is a 1,250-pound open wheel car with a 72-inch wheelbase -- essentially a self-starting Midget. Originally powered by a 250 horsepower Dodge Neon engine, the division has transitioned to the K20 C1 Honda Turbo.

== Outlaw karts ==
Outlaw karts are go karts with roll cages and wings. They are some of the cheapest race cars that are very competitive, costing around $5,000. Most tracks are one sixth of a mile or less. Outlaw karts run side-mounted engines of various types. The beginner boxstock and boxstock divisions run pull start clone motors and are usually for the younger drivers first getting their start. The intermediate division run 250 cc dirt bike engines with the drivers or teams having the choice of running a four-stroke or a two-stroke. At some tracks, the intermediate division has to run a harder compound of tire. The biggest division in outlaw karts is the open division. The opens can run 450 cc four strokes, 500 cc two strokes, or 550 cc four-strokes. The 450 cc and 500 cc motors are the more popular options because the 550 cc motors are not run at all tracks, and the tracks that do run them make the kart weigh extra. The weight range for the karts is 150 lb to 500 lb.

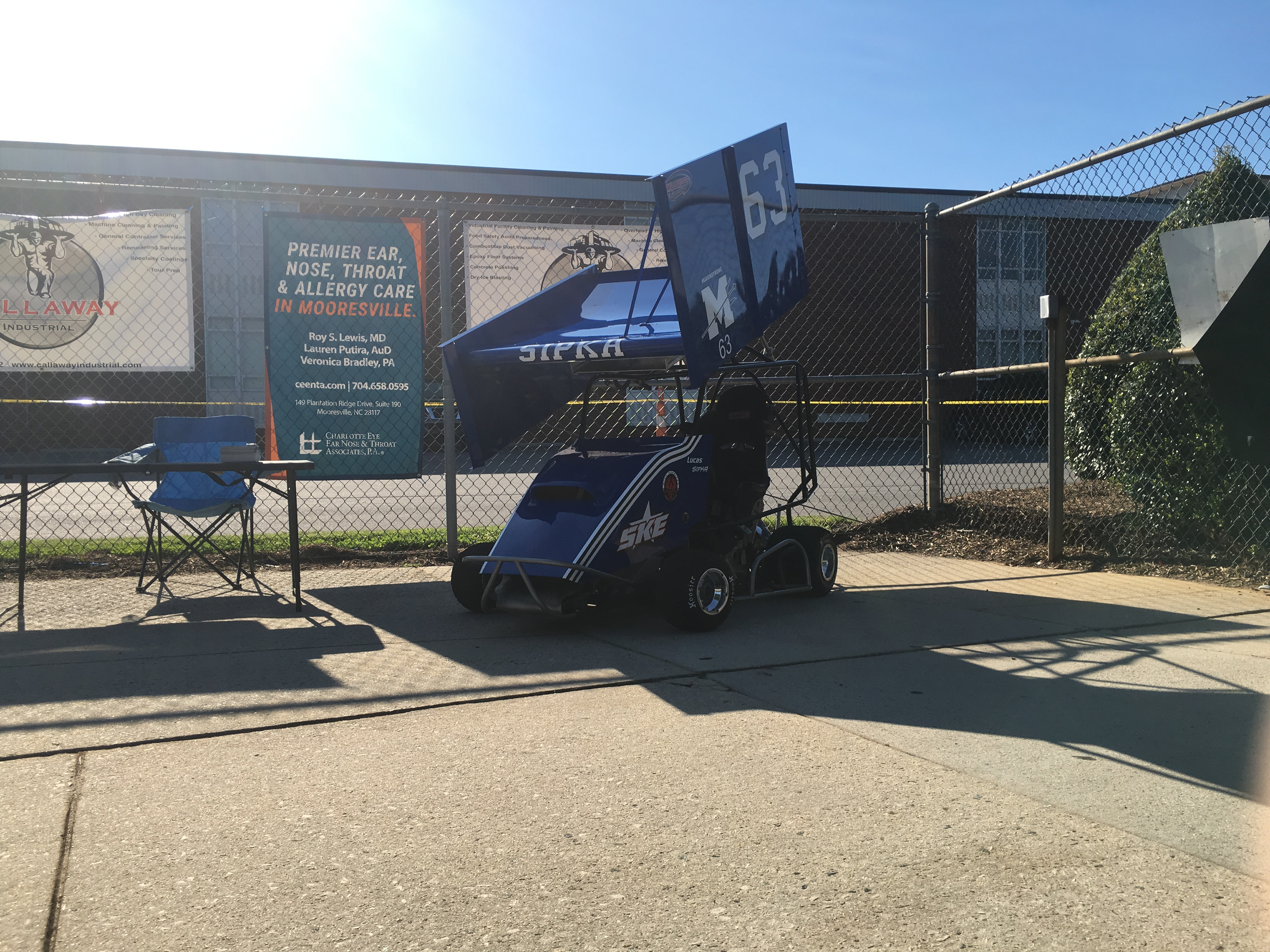
Outlaw kart

== Sanctioning bodies ==
The NOS Energy Drink World of Outlaws (WoO) is a division of 410ci (6.7L) winged sprint cars that run all over the United States and have a few events in Canada. The cars have 15-inch (380 mm) wide right rear tires and 410 cubic inch engines with mechanical fuel injection. These sprint cars have no batteries or starters in them, necessitating push starts by a quad or truck. They also do not have flywheels, clutches or transmissions, but the direct drive systems can be engaged or disengaged from the cockpits. This is done both for weight reasons and tradition. Another tradition the WoO has pertaining their "A-main" (the last race of the event) is to have the cars line up four wide just before starting the race as a salute to fans in attendance, giving rise to the popular PA message "you want the best, now you have them four abreast".

The All Star Circuit of Champions (ASCoC) is an American motorsports sanctioning body of winged sprint car racing founded in 1970. The series sanctions 410ci sprint car races in Ohio, Indiana, Pennsylvania, Michigan, Illinois, Wisconsin, New York, and Florida. On average the series runs 40 races per year, starting February and ending in October each year.

The United States Automobile Club (USAC) National Sprint Car Championship is a division of wingless 410 cubic inch sprint cars that run throughout the United States on asphalt and dirt tracks. The USAC also sanctions regional 360ci wingless sprint car series: the USAC East Coast Sprint Cars, USAC Southwest Sprint Cars, and USAC West Coast Sprint Cars.

The United Racing Company (URC) is a division for winged sprint cars that run mainly in the northeastern part of the United States in Pennsylvania, New Jersey, and Delaware. The URC started in 1948 with 11 races in its season. It slowly progressed to 28 races. The URC uses a 360 cubic inch (5.9 L) engine which generates approximately 650 horsepower (480 kW). They race with alcohol fuel and use mechanical fuel injection (MFI) to deliver it into the combustion chamber.

The American Sprint Car Series (ASCS) sanctions both winged and wingless sprint car racing within the United States. ASCS winged cars use a 360 cubic inch engine which lead to fans calling the cars "360s". The series was started by racing promoter Emmett Hahn. The series national headquarters were located in Tulsa, Oklahoma for much of its history, but moved to Concord, North Carolina in 2024 following World Racing Group's purchase of the series. The all-time leader in wins for the series is Texan Gary Wright with 127 A main victories under his belt. Engine rules for the non-wing cars vary by series with some having unlimited displacement engines.

The International Motor Contest Association (IMCA) was organized in 1915, and is currently the oldest active auto racing sanctioning body in the United States. It sanctions traditional 305 non-winged and winged sprint cars under the IMCA RaceSaver Sprint Car class.

In Australia, sprint car racing is controlled by the Sprintcar Control Council of Australia (SCCA) who sanction the Australian Championships and the World Series Sprintcar series as well as the various state championships and other meetings held around the country.

== Wingless sprint car series ==
Series	Engine	Founded	Countries	Locations
AMSOIL USAC National Sprint Car Championship	410 ci	1956	(United States)	Indiana, Arizona, California, Florida, Illinois, Iowa, Nebraska, New Jersey, New York, Ohio, Pennsylvania
USAC/CRA AMSOIL Sprint Car Series	410 ci	2004	(United States)	California, Arizona
USAC Midwest Wingless Racing Association	410 ci	2020	(United States)	Iowa, Kansas, Missouri
POWRi WAR Sprint League	410 ci	2012	(United States)	Missouri
Buckeye Outlaw Sprint Series	410 ci	2011	(United States)	Ohio, Indiana, Pennsylvania
Michigan Traditional Sprints	410 ci	2006	(United States)	Michigan, Pennsylvania
Midwest Sprint Car Series	410ci	2001	(United States)	Illinois, Indiana
500 Sprint Car Tour	410 ci	2022	(United States)	Indiana, Michigan, Ohio, Tennessee
USAC East Coast Sprint Cars	360 ci	2018	(United States)	Delaware, New Jersey, New York, Pennsylvania, Virginia
USAC Southwest Sprint Cars	360 ci	1991–2020	(United States)	Arizona, Nevada, New Mexico
USAC West Coast Sprint Cars	360 ci	2009	(United States)	California
New Mexico Motor Racing Association	360 ci	1946	(United States)	New Mexico, Texas
Heartland Racing Association	360 ci	2006	(United States)	Minnesota, South Dakota, Iowa
Heart of the West Racing Series	360 ci	2013	(United States)	Minnesota, South Dakota, Wyoming
UMSS Traditional Sprint Car Series	360 ci	2011	(United States)	Minnesota, Wisconsin
Northern Renegades	360 ci	2017	(United States)	Minnesota
Northern California Modified Association	360 ci	1988	(United States)	California
Hunt Magnetos Sprint Car Series	360 ci (Spec)		(United States)	California
Ultimate Sprint Car Series	360 ci	2024	(United States)	California
V8 Non-wing Sprints Australia	346 ci	2016	(Australia)	Queensland, Victoria, Western Australia
ASCS Desert Non-Wing Sprints	??? ci	2019	(United States)	Arizona
ASCS Elite Non-Wing Sprints	305 ci Unlimited (2018+)	2014	(United States)	Texas, Oklahoma, Arkansas
ASCS Elite North Non-Wing Sprints	Unlimited	2020	(United States)	Colorado, Texas
Northeast Wingless Sprint Cars	Crate	2015	(United States)	New Jersey, New York
RUSH Sprint Car Series	Crate	2018	(United States)	Ohio, Pennsylvania
Wingless Sprint Series	360	2016		Oregon
Wisconsin Wingless Sprint Series	Crate	2015	(United States)	Wisconsin
Australian Wingless Sprint Racing	V6		(Australia)	New South Wales, Northern Territory, Queensland, South Australia, Tasmania, Victoria, Western Australia
New Zealand Wingless Sprint Racing	V6		(New Zealand)	Christchurch, Auckland, Tauranga, Invercargill

== Winged sprint car series ==
Series	Engine	Founded	Countries	Locations
World of Outlaws Sprint Car Series	410 ci	1978	(United States)	19 states
High Limit Racing	410 ci	2022	(United States)	California, Illinois, Indiana, Iowa, Kansas, Nebraska, New Jersey, Ohio, Pennsylvania, South Dakota
All Star Circuit of Champions	410 ci	1970–2023; 2025–	(United States)	Ohio, Indiana, Michigan, New York, Pennsylvania
National Sprint League (ended)	410 ci	2014–2016	(United States)	Iowa, Missouri, Illinois, Minnesota, Nebraska, Wisconsin, South Dakota
POWRi 410 Outlaw Sprint League	410 ci	2022	(United States)	Missouri, Kansas, Illinois, Indiana, Iowa, Kentucky, Oklahoma, Texas
IRA Outlaw Sprint Series	410 ci	1967	(United States)	Illinois, Wisconsin
King of the West 410 Sprint Car Series	410 ci	1960	(United States)	California, Oregon, Washington
Midwest Open Wheel Association Sprint Car Series	410 ci		(United States)	Illinois, Iowa,
Northern Outlaws Sprint Association	410 ci	1994	(United States) (Canada)	Manitoba, Minnesota, North Dakota
Ohio Valley Sprint Car Association	410 ci	2010	(United States)	Ohio, West Virginia
Fremont/Attica Sprint Title	410 & 305 ci	2009	(United States)	Ohio, Michigan, Pennsylvania
Ohio Sprint Car Series	410 ci	2016	(United States)	Ohio
Must See Racing	410 ci	2008	(United States)	Michigan, Ohio, Illinois, Idaho
American Sprint Car Series	360 ci	1992	(United States)	Arizona, Arkansas, Iowa, Kansas, Minnesota, Missouri, Montana, Nebraska, New Mexico, Oklahoma, South Dakota, Tennessee, Texas
Great Lakes Super Sprints	360 ci	2015	(United States) (Canada)	Indiana, Michigan, Ohio, Canada
POWRi Desert Wing Sprint League	360 ci	2020	(United States)	New Mexico, Arizona
Sprint Car Challenge Tour	360 ci	2017	(United States)	California
Civil War Sprint Car Series	360 ci	1993	(United States)	California
Empire Super Sprints	360 ci	1983	(United States) (Canada)	New Jersey, New York, Ontario, Pennsylvania, Quebec
Midwest Sprintcar Association	360 ci	1996	(United States)	Wisconsin
Nebraska 360 Sprint Series	360 ci		(United States)	Iowa, Kansas, Nebraska, South Dakota
Patriot Sprint Tour	360 ci	2003	(United States) (Canada)	New York, Ohio, Pennsylvania, Ontario
Southern Ontario Sprints	360 ci	1996	(Canada)	Ontario
Southern Sprint Car Shootout Series	360 ci	2016	(United States)	Florida
Sprint Cars of New England	360 ci	2004	(United States)	New Hampshire, Vermont
Sprints on Dirt	360 ci		(United States) (Canada)	Indiana, Michigan, Ohio, Ontario
United Racing Club	360 ci	1948	(United States)	Delaware, New Jersey, New York, Pennsylvania
United Sprint Car Series	360 ci	1997	(United States)	Alabama, Arkansas, Georgia, Mississippi, Missouri, North Carolina, South Carolina, Tennessee
Upper Midwest Sprint Car Series	360 ci	2009	(United States)	Iowa, Minnesota, Wisconsin
World Series Sprintcars	410 ci	1987	(Australia)	New South Wales, Queensland, South Australia, Western Australia, Victoria
Oval Superstars Tour	410 ci	2016	(New Zealand)	North Island including Wellington, Palmerston North, Napier, Stratford, Huntly
Ultimate Sprintcar Championship	410 ci	2014	(Australia)	New South Wales, Queensland, South Australia, Victoria
Sprintcar All Stars	360 ci	2007	(Australia)	New South Wales, South Australia, Victoria
Hydraulink War of the Wings	410 ci	1997	(New Zealand)	South Island including Nelson, Christchurch, Cromwell, Invercargill, Greymouth, Ellesmere
Daltons Sprintcar Summer Slam	410 ci		(New Zealand)	South Island including Nelson, Christchurch, Cromwell, Invercargill
Outlaw Sprintcar Masters Series	410 ci	2023	(New Zealand)	North Island including Gisborne, Kihikihi, Napier, Auckland
Sprint Car Power Tour	410 ci	2026	(Australia)	East Coast including: Sydney, Toowoomba, Mildura, Tolmer

== Sprint Car World Championship ==
Despite over 50 years of sprint car racing, the category has only ever held one unofficial "world championship". This was in 1987 at the ⅓ mile (586 metres (641 yd)) Claremont Speedway in Perth, Western Australia. The event attracted a collection of drivers from Australia, NZ, Canada, and South Africa, as well as several World of Outlaws drivers. Australian veteran Garry Rush from Sydney, a 10-time winner of the Australian Sprintcar Championship, was the winner.

== Television coverage ==
=== United States ===
Wingless cars were televised first when USAC had an ESPN television contract. The first national live television deal with winged sprint cars came on The Nashville Network (TNN) in 1992–93 and again in 1993–94 with a winter-based series in Arizona, which featured Mike Joy calling the action. Live coverage of the Knoxville Nationals on The Nashville Network began in 1995. A year later, a next-day tape deal with CBS for one race at Eldora Speedway aired while TNN coverage expanded. By 2000, CBS (which owned TNN at the time) announced TNN would air 15 live events, including the King's Royal at Eldora Speedway and the Knoxville Nationals. By the 2001 season, plans were to cover 18 live races, but midway through the season MTV Networks closed the CBS motorsports operations. This move relegated the remainder of the World of Outlaws season to tape delay races. A tape delayed deal with Speed Channel followed for the next season. Television coverage began on the Outdoor Channel in 2003. Events are usually tape delayed for two weeks or more. The Knoxville Nationals were on Speed Channel. The 2004 Knoxville Nationals did not air as bad weather postponed the event, and there was not enough space for Speed to air the event, won by Kraig Kinser. In 2003, Johnson sold his organization to DIRT Motorsports. Because of complaints about DIRT Motorsports and the lack of television coverage, Northwest Sprint Tour owner Fred Brownfield formed the National Sprint Tour as a rival to the World of Outlaws Sprint for the 2006 season. Notable teams in the NST included Steve Kinser Racing (No. 11), Roth Motorsports (sometimes known as the "Beef Packers" team) (No. 83), Tony Stewart Racing (No. 20). After Brownfield Promotions' owner Fred Brownfield was killed in a crash, Kinser and principals of two other teams purchased the entire Brownfield promotion. That series folded after the 2006 season, while the Northwest tour, a regional tour, was sold. The SuperClean Summer of Money aired on ESPN2 starting in mid June 2008 with the World of Outlaws at Knoxville Raceway and for eight weeks straight leading up to the Knoxville Nationals which were live on Speed. In 2015, the World of Outlaws had several races broadcast on CBS Sports Network. Knoxville Raceway has their weekly series as well as World of Outlaws and National Sprint League events on MavTV. USAC currently has some races televised on MavTV, primarily through Jack Slash Media's Dirty 30 highlights program. Other series such as the Lucas Oil ASCS Sprint Car Series, King of the West Sprint Cars, King of the Wing Pavement Sprint Cars, and several weekly regional series on MavTV.

=== Australia ===
In Australia, the World Series Sprintcars was formerly televised on free-to-air channel One HD.

=== New Zealand ===
In New Zealand, the Hydraulink War of the Wings is streamed only by RJPTV on a pay per video program. However Sprintcar racing can be seen from Western Springs in Auckland or the Bay per View from Baypark Speedway the biggest Sprintcar track in New Zealand

== Safety aspects ==
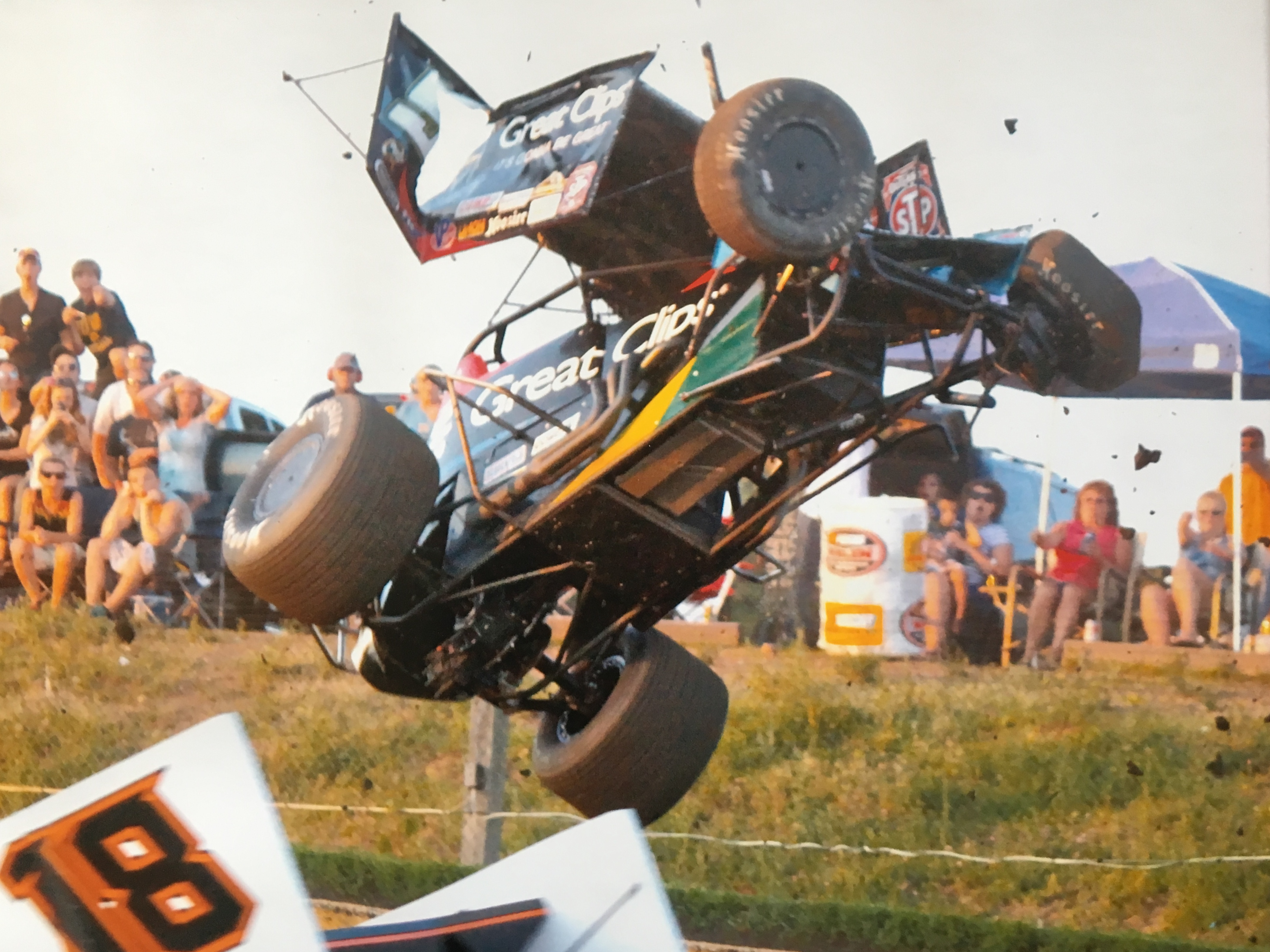
A World of Outlaws sprint car flips down the backstretch at Cedar Lake Speedway, Wisconsin

Safety in sprint car racing has continuously evolved over the years as the cars have gotten faster and teams look to garner any advantage with weight and horsepower. While many regulations are centered around the class or division, each sanctioning body typically has a section in its rulebook dedicated to safety. These can vary between sanctioning bodies, and many even set safety standards for those hosting an event.

Some of the most common safety requirements placed on the teams are: an emergency shut-off switch, a quick-detach steering wheel, aluminum seats with high impact head rests with shock absorbing materials, fire resistant suits, underwear, shoes, and gloves, a full face helmet meeting that meets or exceeds a specified Snell or SFI rating, safety harness (most common is a 5-point harness) that meets a specified SFI rating, a neck restraint that meets a given safety rating, and at any time the car and equipment may be subject to inspection. The various SFI and Snell ratings may differ between sanctioning bodies, and many rule books include additional safety recommendations to be used at team or driver discretion.

As for those hosting an event the sanctioning body will often place mandatory safety requirements on the facility including guard rails, retaining walls, concrete walls, and electronic caution lights. It is also typically the facility's responsibility of having an ambulance on site that meets DOT standards, fire equipment and staff, properly licensed medical staff and equipment, track communications, and safety equipment such as tow trucks. It is common for a facility to be visited prior to an event for inspection and updates be made prior to the event taking place.

== See also ==
- List of National Sprint Car Hall of Fame inductees
- Oval Superstars Tour
- Australian Sprintcar Grand Prix
- Open sportsman
- Similar formulae of short oval auto racing popular in the United Kingdom:
  - BriSCA Formula 1 Stock Cars
  - BriSCA Formula 2 Stock Cars
  - Superstox
  - V8 Hotstox
- Hydraulink War of the Wings
