= TRX =

TRX may refer to:

== Transportation ==
- Honda TRX250R, a 1980s ATV
- Honda TRX450R, a 2000s and 2010s ATV
- Michelin TRX, a car tire
- Nissan Pintara TRX
- TraXion, a defunct Danish railway company
- Yamaha TRX850, a sports motorcycle
- Ram 1500 TRX, a production model 4x4 performance truck from Stellantis

== Other ==
- Total prescriptions (TRx), see Pharmaceutical marketing
- TRX, an identifier for Thioredoxin
- TRX System, suspension training
- Tun Razak Exchange, Kuala Lumpur, Malaysia
- Tron (cryptocurrency)

== See also ==
- TRX1 (disambiguation)
