= Australasian Safari =

Off-road motor sport racing event held in Australia (1985–2014)

- Category: Off Road Rally
- Country: Western Australia
- Inaugural event: 1985
- Folded: 2014
- Official Website: Australasian Safari

The Australasian Safari was an off-road motor sport racing event held in Australia between 1985 and 2014.

== History ==
The Australasian Safari was first run in 1985 and held under the International Sporting Code of FIM and from 1999, the General Competition Rules of Motorcycling Australia.

It was usually held around the end of August, in the Australian winter, and covered approximately 5,500 kilometres, mostly through the Outback in just over a week. Like the Dakar Rally, the vehicle classes involved were motorcycles and cars, however there were no truck class. From 2008, a quad class was introduced.

The event grew in size and scope for the first few years. In 1988, Australia's Bicentennial year, the event was tagged "The Big One" and was expanded to cover 10,000 km in 15 days, with a start in Alice Springs and traveling across the Tanami Desert, through the Kimberley region into Darwin, across the Gulf Country of far northwest Queensland and an eventual finish in Sydney. Out of 196 starting vehicles, only 96 finished the race.

Initially known as the Wynn's Safari for commercial reasons, the event was renamed in 1989 to the Australian Safari, and to the Australasian Safari in 2008. From 2007 the event was hosted in Western Australia.

Between 1994 and 1997 the event was included in the FIA Cross-Country Rally World Cup. It was last held in 2014 after Tourism Western Australia withdrew its funding for the event.

== Results ==
Year	Auto - Winner	Moto - Winner	Quad - Winner	Ref
1985	Andrew Cowan Mitsubishi Pajero	Steve Chapman Honda XR600	-	
1986	Andrew Cowan Mitsubishi Pajero	Allan Cunnynghame Yamaha XT 600	-	
1987	Doug Stewart Mitsubishi Pajero	Steve Chapman Honda XR 600	-	
1988	Ross Dunkerton Mitsubishi Pajero	Michael Goddard Honda NXR 650	-	
1989	David Officer Mitsubishi Pajero	Steve Chapman Honda XR600	-	
1990	Kenjiro Shinozuka Mitsubishi Pajero	John Hederics Honda XR600	-	
1991	David Officer Mitsubishi Triton	John Hederics Honda XR600	-	
1992	Reg Owen Nissan Patrol	John Hederics Honda XR600	-	
1993	Ian Swan Nissan Patrol	Michael Goddard Kawasaki KLX 650R	-	
1994	Jean-Pierre Fontenay Mitsubishi Pajero	John Hederics Honda XR600	-	
1995	Doug Manwaring Nissan Patrol	John Hederics Honda XR600	-	
1996	Bruce Garland Holden Jackaroo	John Hederics Honda XR600	-	
1997	Mikhail Naryshkin Mitsubishi Pajero	Andy Haydon KTM 640 LC4	-	
1998	Cancelled		-	
1999	Bruce Garland Holden Jackaroo	Stephen Greenfield Honda XR600	-	
2000	Bruce Garland Holden Jackaroo	Andy Caldecott KTM 660	-	
2001	Bruce Garland Holden Jackaroo	Andy Caldecott KTM 660	-	
2002	Bruce Garland Holden Jackaroo	Andy Caldecott KTM 660	-	
2003	John Hederics Nissan Patrol	Andy Caldecott KTM 660	-	
2004	John Hederics Holden Rodeo	J Cunningham Honda XR650	-	
2005	Cancelled		-	
2006	Cancelled		-	
2007	Hederics/Williams Holden Rodeo	Grabham Honda CRF450X	-	
2008	Riley/Doble Mitsubishi Pajero	Grabham Honda CRF450X	John Maragozidis Polaris Outlaw IRS	
2009	Riley/Doble Mitsubishi Pajero	Jacob Smith Honda CRF450X	Josef Machacek Yamaha Raptor 700R	
2010	Craig Lowndes/Kees Weel Holden Rodeo	Ben Grabham KTM 530 EXC	Paul Smith Honda TRX 700XX	
2011	Riley/Doble Mitsubishi Pajero	Todd Smith Honda CRF450X	John Maragozidis MMR Interceptor 850	
2012	Hederics/Weel Holden Colorado	Jake Smith Honda CRF450X	Paul Smith Honda TRX700XX	
2013	Trigg/Olholm Toyota Hilux	Rodney Faggotter Yamaha WR450F	Heath Young KTM 690 Rally	
2014	McShane/Hayes Toyota Tacoma	Rodney Faggotter Yamaha WR450F	John Maragozidis MMR Interceptor 850	

== See also ==
- Baja 1000
- Budapest-Bamako
- Dakar Rally
- Finke Desert Race
- Offroad racing
- Plymouth-Banjul Challenge
