= Eurorail =

Eurorail can refer to:

- Eurail, a company that sells passes and tickets for European railroads
- Eurorail, freight operator in Belgium
- Eurorails, a popular variation of the Empire Builder board game
- Privatbanen Sønderjylland, a defunct Danish railway company also known as "EuroRail"
