= Craig Lowndes =

Australian racing driver (born 1974)

Craig Lowndes OAM
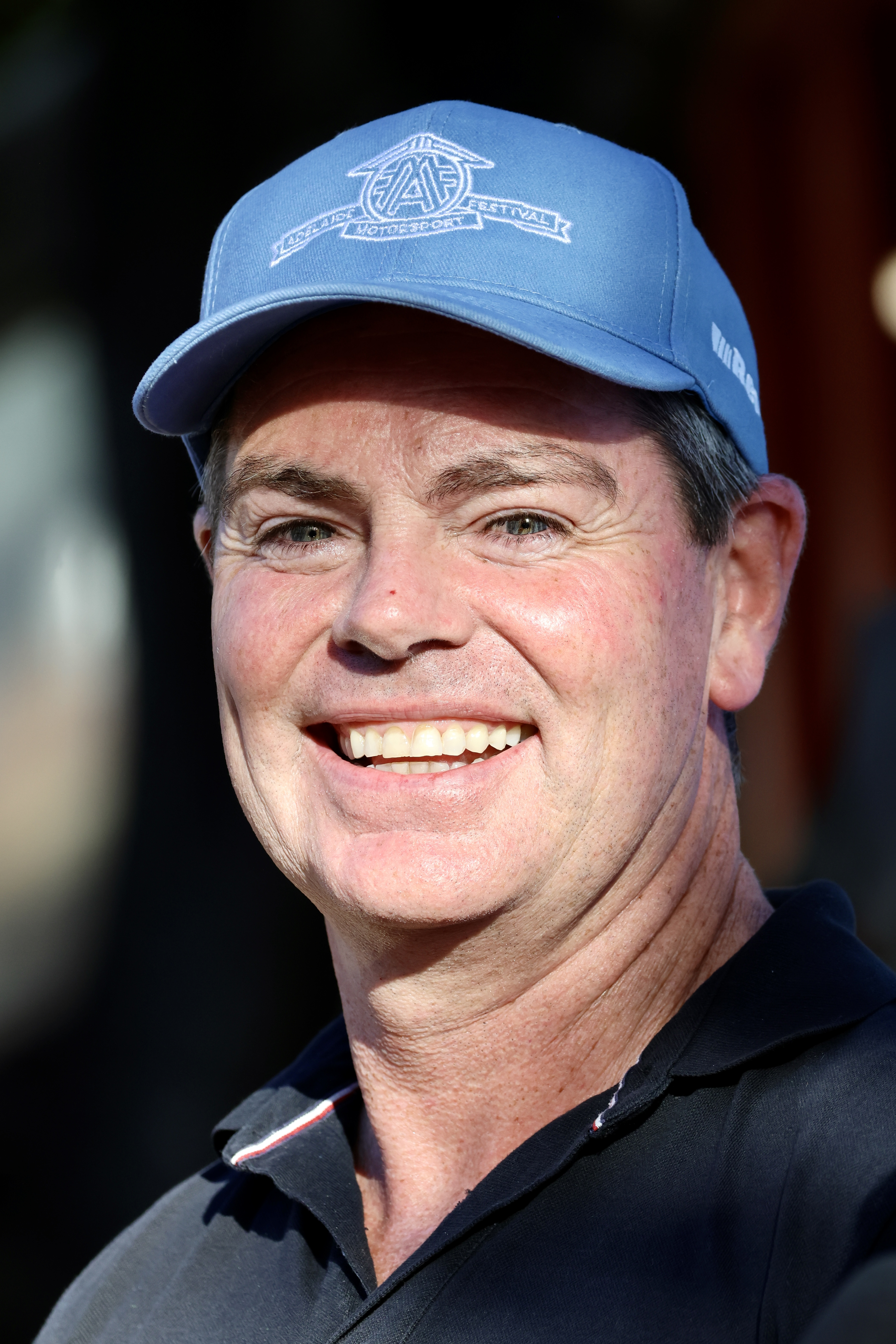
- Lowndes at the 2026 Adelaide Motorsport Festival
- Born: Craig Andrew Lowndes; 21 June 1974 (age 52); Melbourne, Victoria, Australia
- Spouse(s): Natalie Lowndes (m. 1997; sep. 2011) Lara Lowndes (m. 2015; sep. 2025)
- Children: 2
- Awards: Full list

Supercars Championship career
- Current team: Team 18 (Endurance race co-driver)
- Championships: 3 (1996, 1998, 1999)
- Races: 681
- Wins: 110
- Podiums: 266
- Pole positions: 42
- 2020 position: NC (0 pts)

Craig Andrew Lowndes OAM (born 21 June 1974) is an Australian racing car driver in the Repco Supercars Championship racing for Team 18. He is also a TV commentator.

Lowndes is a three-time V8 Supercar champion, a five-time Barry Sheene Medalist, and a seven-time winner of Australia's most prestigious motor race, the Bathurst 1000 and two-time winner of the Bathurst 12 Hour.

On 6 July 2018, Lowndes announced his intention to step down from full-time driving at the end of the 2018 season, continuing as a co-driver. As of 2026, he participates in his 33rd consecutive Bathurst 1000.

Lowndes also voices Conrod in Roary the Racing Car in both the UK and US.

== Racing career ==
Lowndes began his racing career at age nine, driving go-karts and riding dirt bikes.

=== Early career ===
Lowndes moved up to race cars in 1991, driving a Van Diemen in the Motorcraft Formula Ford "Driver to Europe" Series. Despite the car being several years old and receiving minimal sponsorship, Lowndes achieved almost immediate success. Lowndes won the Australian Formula Ford Championship in 1993 which qualified him for the Formula Ford Festival in England that same year, where he finished third. In 1994, he moved up to Australia's top rank of open wheel racing, Formula Brabham. His success in Formula Brabham driving an ageing Cheetah Mk9 against much more modern cars was rewarded with the Australian Silver Star.

=== Holden Racing Team ===
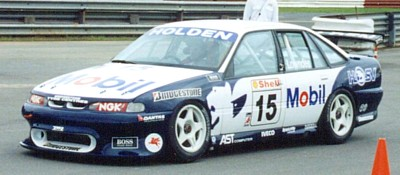
1996 HRT Commodore

In 1994, Lowndes joined the Holden Racing Team as a test driver. Having looked sufficiently promising in his maiden outings with the team, Lowndes was drafted into the No. 015 Commodore with Brad Jones for the 1994 Sandown 500. It was expected to be a one-off performance as Rickard Rydell from the BTCC was to join the team for Bathurst. However, Rydell was forced to stay home for family reasons, handing Lowndes a second opportunity to impress the team.

After a gruelling double-stint by Jones, Lowndes began the final stint of the race as the closest challenger to the dominant DJR Falcon of John Bowe. With eleven laps to go, Lowndes stunned the touring car establishment by overtaking Bowe on the outside of Griffins Bend. Bowe retook the lead a lap later when Lowndes was unsettled by lapped traffic. Nevertheless, second was an impressive achievement for a rookie driver. Lowndes won fans in pit lane when he later admitted that his passing move on Bowe was simply a case of missing his brake marker.

It would be almost a year before Lowndes would find himself back behind the driver's seat for HRT. Having been retained as their official test driver for 1995, Lowndes was forced to sit on the sidelines as the team persisted with their experienced line-up of Tomas Mezera and Peter Brock. At the season-ending endurance events, Lowndes was back behind the wheel and immediately impressed by taking his maiden pole position at the Sandown 500. His race would end in the gravel trap at Turn 1 after a spirited battle with veteran Glenn Seton. The rookie would prove his speed was no flash in the pain just a few short weeks later when he stormed to pole at the Bathrust 1000. His HRT Commodore would DNF early on in the race when both cars experienced oil pressure problems and eventual engine failure. The team had seen enough, however, and for the 1996 season Lowndes replaced Tomas Mezera.

In his first full season as an Australian Touring Car driver, Lowndes again surprised the establishment, winning the championship by 79 points from reigning champion, John Bowe. He also won both the Sandown and Bathurst races with teammate Greg Murphy, a rare treble. His Bathurst 1000 victory made him the youngest-ever winner of the race, and with Murphy, the youngest-ever driver pairing to win the Bathurst 1000. His unprecedented success prompted team owner Tom Walkinshaw to sign him to a ten-year management deal:

"We signed a deal earlier this year to get me overseas in 1997. Under the terms of the arrangement, he has got seven years to put me into F1. It's pretty rare for a young Australian to get a deal like this, although it's not so unusual in Europe for young drivers to get picked up at an early age."

=== Formula 3000 ===
At the end of 1996, Lowndes left Australia for Europe to pursue his F1 dream with Walkinshaw. A successful F3 test prompted both Lowndes and Walkinshaw to skip the category altogether in favour of the heavier yet faster F3000 series. Super Nova team boss David Sears was impressed with Lowndes, but his insistence on a two-year commitment wasn't to Walkinshaw's liking and ultimately led to the Scotsman signing Lowndes to the RSM Marko Team in the 1997 International Formula 3000 Championship. Lowndes would partner the highly rated Colombian Juan Pablo Montoya.

Qualifying an impressive sixth on debut at Silverstone, Lowndes' rookie season in the category ultimately proved underwhelming, his best finish of 4th in Enna paling in comparison to Montoya's three wins and 2nd in the championship. Commenting on his time at RSM Marko, Lowndes would describe the experience as markedly different from his time at HRT:

"There was one engineer who engineered both cars and (Montoya) drove the car very differently to what I did. They basically made the cars the same and very similar in set-ups and I just had to deal with it."

Despite his struggles, Lowndes was determined to carry on, but with sponsors reluctant to fund another season he duly returned to Australia and HRT.

=== Australian return ===
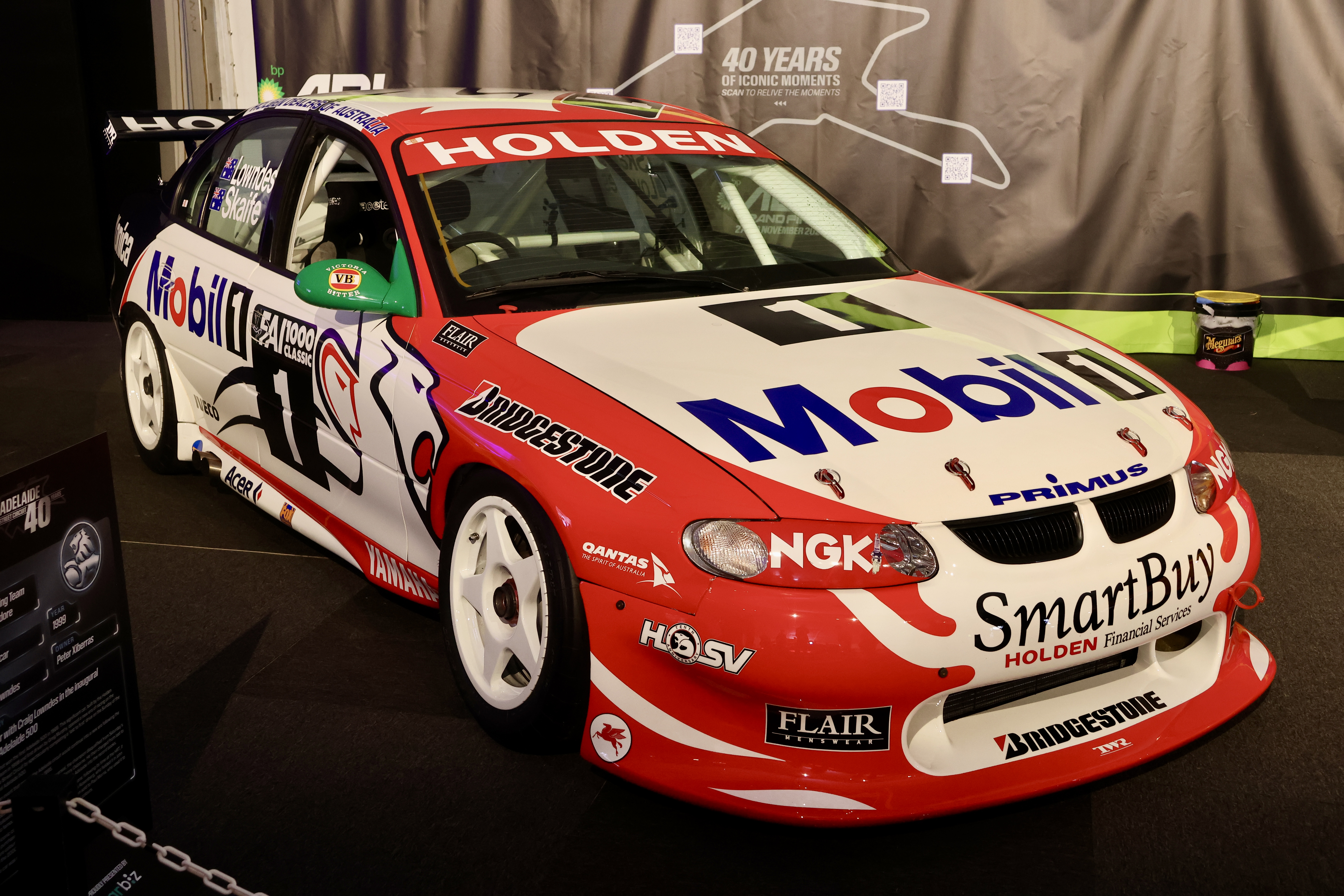
Holden Commodore (VT) of Lowndes on display at the 2025 Adelaide 500

Upon his return to Australia, Lowndes again won the 1997 Sandown 500 for HRT, partnered by New Zealander Greg Murphy. In 1998, he resumed his full-time race seat with the Holden Racing Team (at the expense of Murphy) alongside new teammate and former champion Mark Skaife. Picking up where he left off, Lowndes went on to win his second consecutive Championship.

In 1998, Lowndes flirted with a potential trans-pacific move to the American CART series. Although he tested with Team KOOL Green's Indy Lights outfit (with both he and fellow V8 Supercar regular Jason Bright setting competitive times, the latter for PacWest), Lowndes eventually decided to stay in Australia.

A third title would follow in 1999 with Lowndes finishing off the podium only once in the first 18 races. In the first full year of campaigning the new Holden VT Commodore, Lowndes had amassed a large lead by the time the series arrived for Round 8 at Calder Park Raceway. Having duly won the first sprint race, a poor start by Lowndes saw him bogged down in the field and subsequently tapped by another car which resulted in a spectacular roll over. Despite missing the following round at Symmons Plains Raceway due to injury, Lowndes still managed to clinch the Championship at the Bathurst Classic, finishing second in the final round of the season.

Lowndes began the 2000 season the favorite to win a 4th straight title. In a surprise move, Lowndes' race engineer Rob Starr was moved to the sister car of Skaife. Lowndes struggled with reliability and consistency throughout the season and finished 3rd, behind teammate Mark Skaife and Garth Tander, with three round wins including the Queensland 500. HRT team manager Jeff Grech described the Lowndes/Skaife rivalry as "... insanely competitive. To be honest with you, they both had fun at the expense of my sanity."

=== Ford ===
In 2001, Lowndes caused a stir among race fans when he jumped ship from Holden to arch-rival manufacturer Ford, signing with a new team headed up by former driver Fred Gibson. Gibson had a successful track record as a team owner/manager, having spear-headed Nissan's domination of the ATCC in the early 1990s with, ironically, Mark Skaife. This partnership lasted for two years in which time Lowndes finished seventh and 11th in the championship. The relationship proved unsuccessful due to reliability issues with the Ford Falcon race car and behind-the-scenes uncertainty over the team's direction. Despite the setbacks, Lowndes garnered an admiration from fans for his positive attitude and demeanour. Gibson Motorsport was renamed to 00 Motorsport (pronounced "double-o", being Lowndes' racing number) after a change of management. Lowndes's black and silver Falcon was affectionately referred to as the "green-eyed monster" for the bright green covers over the headlights.

=== Ford Performance Racing ===
Lowndes signed with the factory-sponsored Ford Performance Racing team for the 2003 season. The season saw Lowndes improve from the previous two seasons and managed a fifth place in the championship including his first round win since the Queensland 500 in 2000 and the first with Ford. The season proved inconsistent and reliability issues started setting in throughout the season causing Lowndes to miss out on a chance for the title. 2004 would be Lowndes worst championship year, reliability became a big issue in the FPR garage throughout the season. Lowndes finished 20th in the championship, causing him to leave the team at the end of 2004.

=== Triple Eight Race Engineering ===
Lowndes joined Triple Eight Race Engineering in 2005 and enjoyed his most successful season since switching to Ford. He had the most round victories and the most pole positions of any driver in the championship, and finished second in the final standings behind champion Russell Ingall. At the Bathurst 1000 that year, after qualifying on pole, he spent much time in the pits after two separate incidents which severely damaged his Falcon including a wheel that smashed into his windscreen.

At the V8 Gala Awards, Lowndes was awarded the Barry Sheene Medal, an award akin to Most Valuable Player which is voted on by a team of panellists from the Australian media, motorsport magazines, television commentators and former drivers. This award was first introduced in 2003, in honour of the late Barry Sheene.

=== 2006–2008 ===
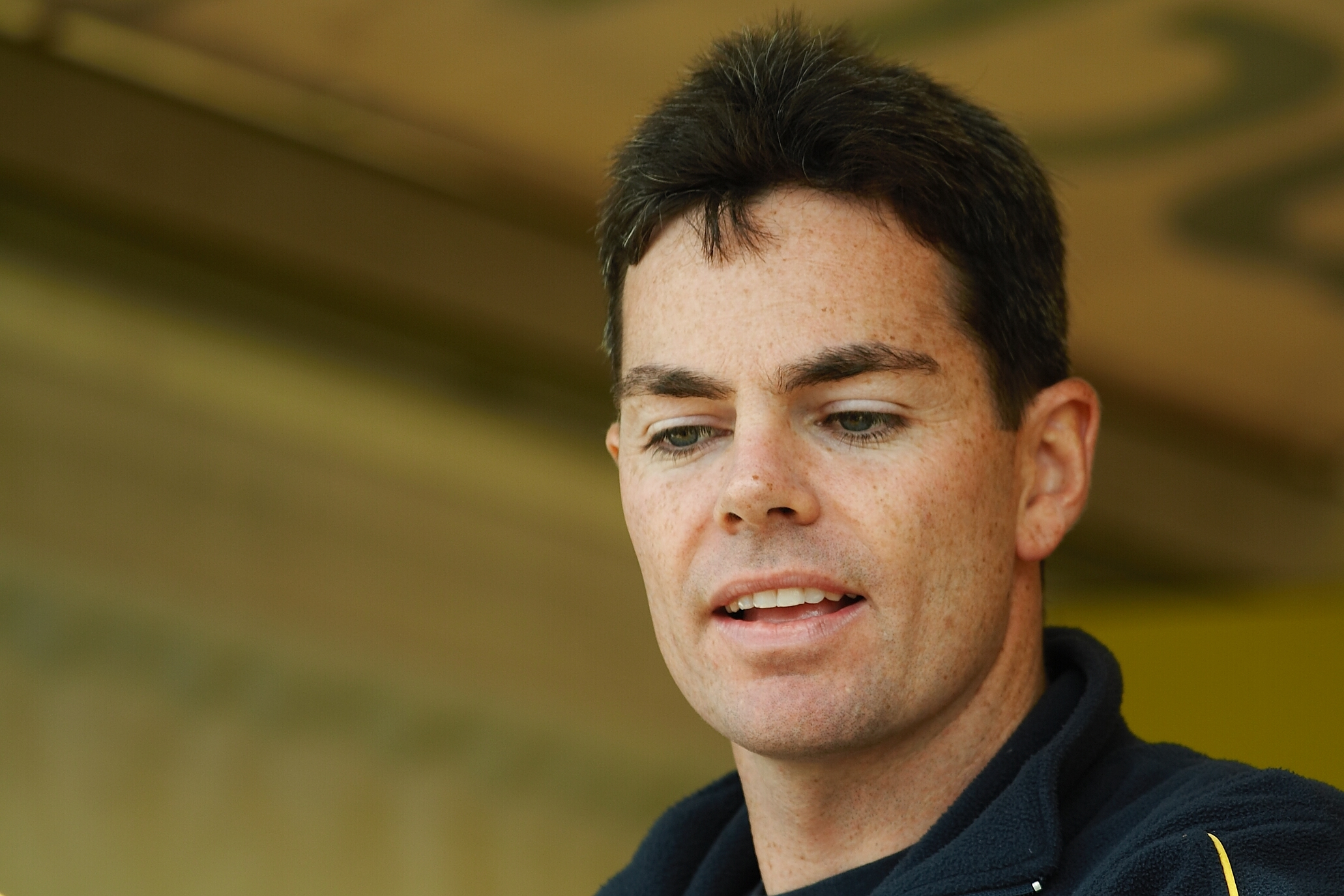
Lowndes in 2006

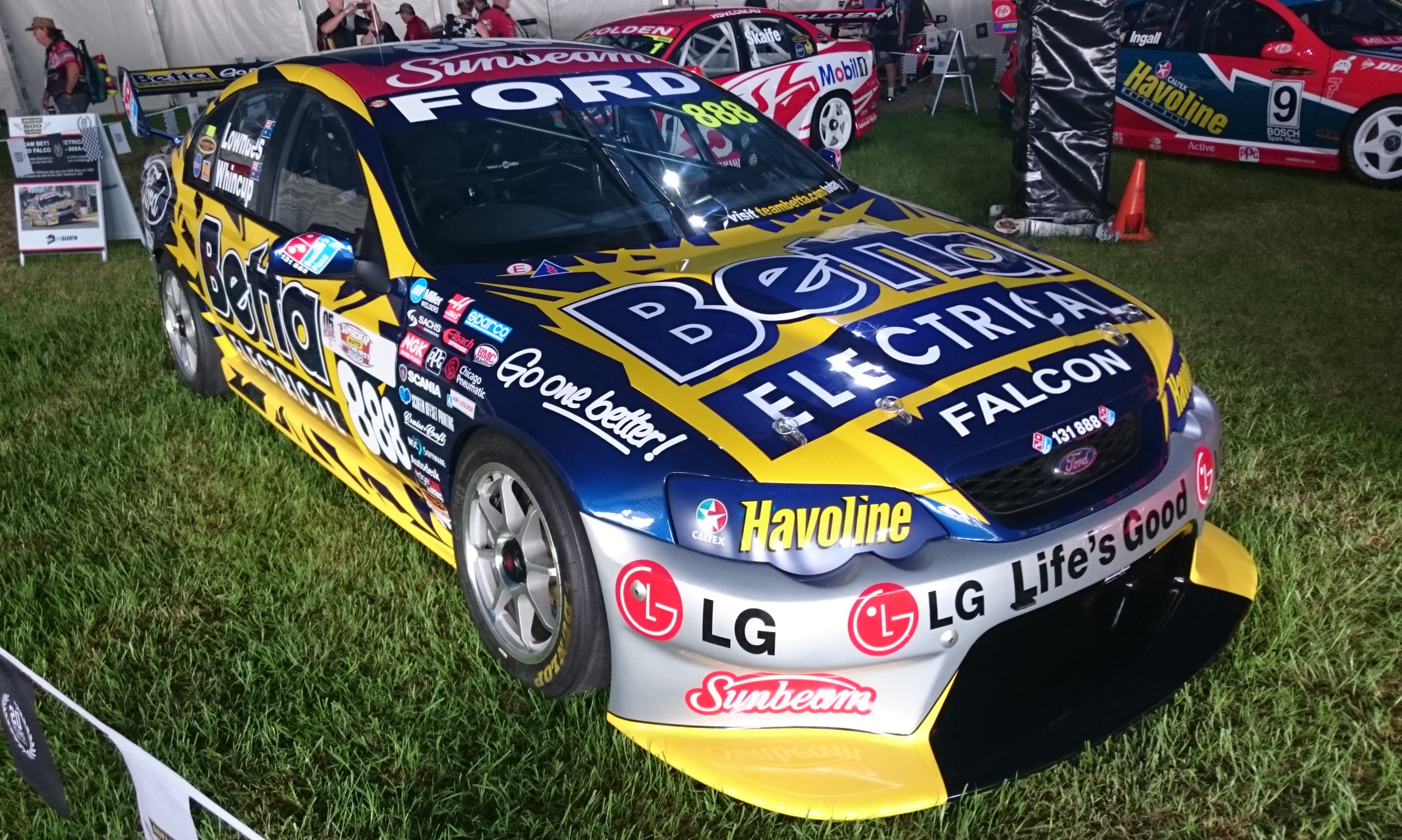
The Ford Falcon BA with which Lowndes and Jamie Whincup won the 2006 Supercheap Auto Bathurst 1000. The car is pictured in 2018.

Lowndes was a contender for the championship right up until the last race, being level on points with Rick Kelly. The two fought one of the closest non-staged finishes in Bathurst 1000 history on 8 October 2006, with Lowndes winning over Kelly by just half a second. It was his first Bathurst win since 1996 and Ford's first since 1998. The win was a very emotional one for Lowndes, being the first Bathurst 1000 held since the death of his long-time mentor Peter Brock at a road rally the month before. As winners of the Bathurst 1000, the inaugural Peter Brock Trophy was presented to Lowndes and his teammate, Jamie Whincup.

Lowndes eventually finished second in the 2006 V8 Supercar season. After complaining of having been "unfairly" held up for up to six seconds a lap by Rick Kelly's teammates over the first two races, Lowndes was level on championship points with Kelly after race 2 (of 3) in the final round. In the deciding race Kelly crashed into Lowndes heading into the hairpin resulting in a lengthy pit stop to repair Lowndes' vehicle. Kelly received a drive-through penalty and went on to finish the race in 18th position and seal the championship victory, while Lowndes finished the race 31st.

Lowndes and Triple Eight Racing lodged a protest and a hearing was set up. The protest was dismissed after a long hearing and Rick Kelly was confirmed as the 2006 champion. Lowndes and Triple Eight Racing decided not to appeal that decision and proclaim themselves the "Moral Champions" for the 2006 season. Lowndes won the Barry Sheene Medal for the second year in a row.

Lowndes had three victories in 2007, the sixth round at Hidden Valley Raceway, and both the endurance races: the Sandown 500 and the Bathurst 1000. He finished third place in the championship, while his teammate, Jamie Whincup, finished second. In 2008, Lowndes and Whincup won the Bathurst 1000 for a third time in a row, becoming only the third pairing in the history of the Bathurst 1000 to achieve it, after Peter Brock and Jim Richards (1978–80) and Peter Brock and Larry Perkins (1982–84).

=== 2009 ===
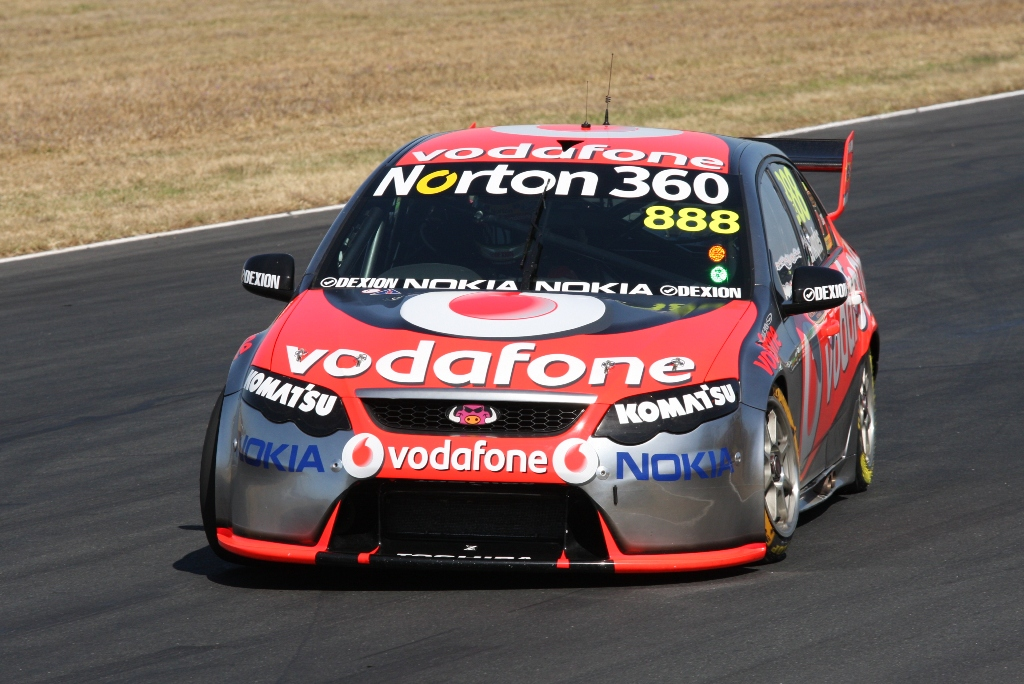
The Ford Falcon of Craig Lowndes at Queensland Raceway, 23 August 2009.

In 2009, Lowndes started the year with a brand new Ford FG Falcon. Despite winning races in Winton, the Gold Coast and Barbagallo, he was unable to match his teammate and finished the year fourth in the standings. Being once again paired up with Whincup in the enduros but suffered the heartbreak of losing the race lead on the final lap of the L&H Phillip Island 500 due to a delaminating tyre. Heading to Bathurst on the verge of making history, they failed in their bid to win a fourth consecutive Bathurst title, due to a drive-thru penalty and a clutch problem.

=== 2010 ===
In 2010, Team Vodafone switched to Holden Commodores as Ford cut sponsorship. Lowndes placed fourth in the championship with podiums in Abu Dhabi, Bahrain, Queensland Raceway and Winton. Partnering five-time champion Mark Skaife, Lowndes won the Bathurst 1000 for the fifth time, as well as the Phillip Island 500. His first solo victory for the season came during the Falken Tasmania Challenge at Symmons Plains.

=== 2011-12 ===
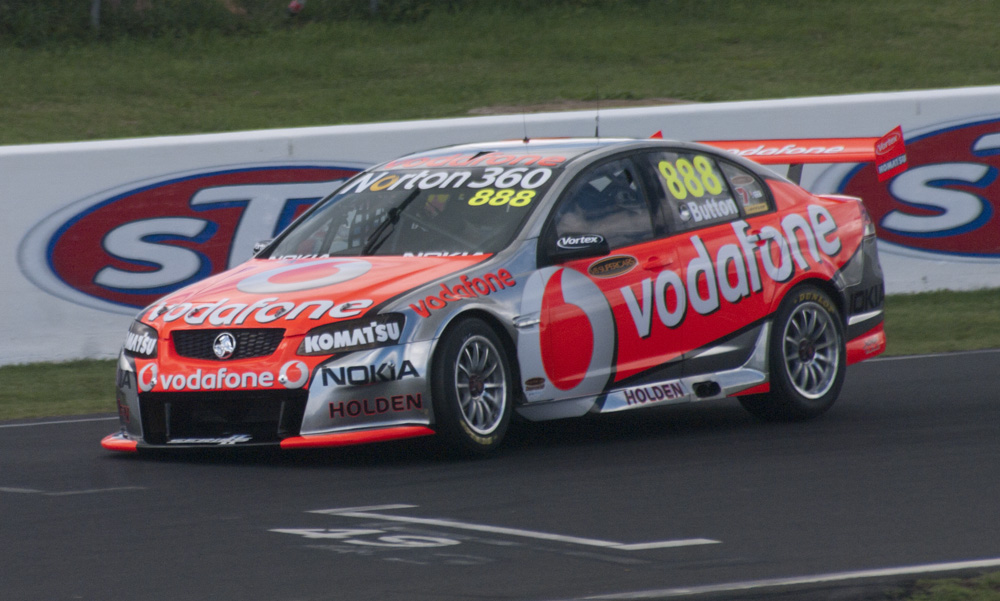
Lowndes placed 2nd in the 2011 V8 Supercars Championship, racing with Triple Eight Race Engineering

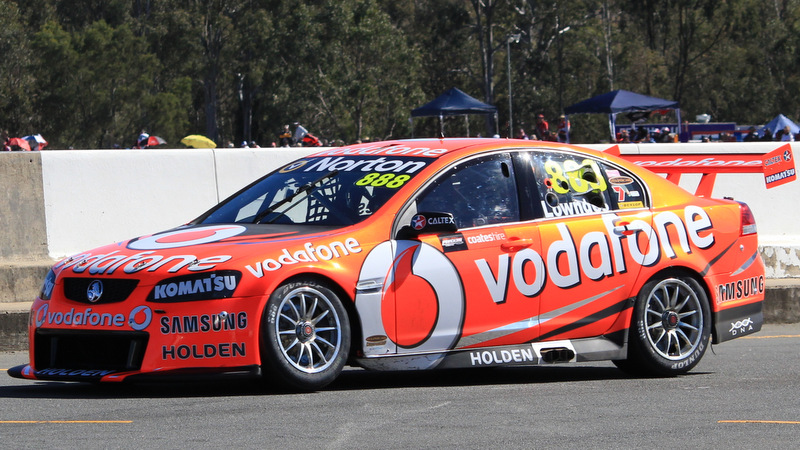
Lowndes racing at the 2012 Coates Hire Ipswich 300

2011 was Lowndes' most competitive season in five years, narrowly finishing second in the championship to teammate Whincup. He achieved five pole positions, a clean sweep of the Queensland Raceway round, another Phillip Island 500 crown with Mark Skaife and second place at Bathurst. Lowndes finished off the year by winning the Sydney 500, and taking out the Barry Sheene Medal for the third time. He backed up his campaign in 2011 by again finishing second to Whincup the following season. 2012 saw Lowndes net seven race victories in the championship, including his fifth Sandown 500 title with teammate Warren Luff.

=== 2013 ===
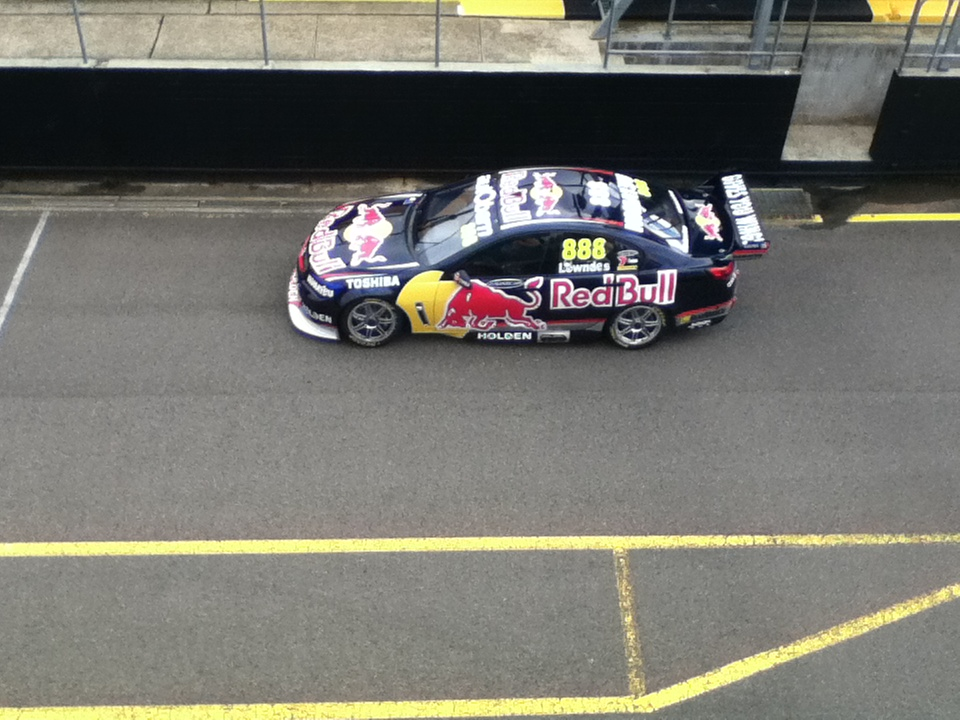
Lowndes during pre-season testing at the Sydney Motorsport Park in 2013

In the 2013 season opener in Adelaide, Lowndes won by a record margin of over 20.5 seconds in Race 1, while coming in third in Race 2. Lowndes' race 1 victory marked the first win under V8 Supercar's new "Car of the Future" regulations, as well as the 90th of his career, equalling all-time rival Mark Skaife. Along with his Triple Eight Racing teammate Jamie Whincup, Lowndes had continued to dominate in the 2013 season, scoring race wins at Adelaide, Barbagallo Raceway, Hidden Valley Raceway, and also winning Race 1 at Gold Coast with co-driver Warren Luff. He ended the season in second for the third consecutive year, all behind Jamie Whincup.

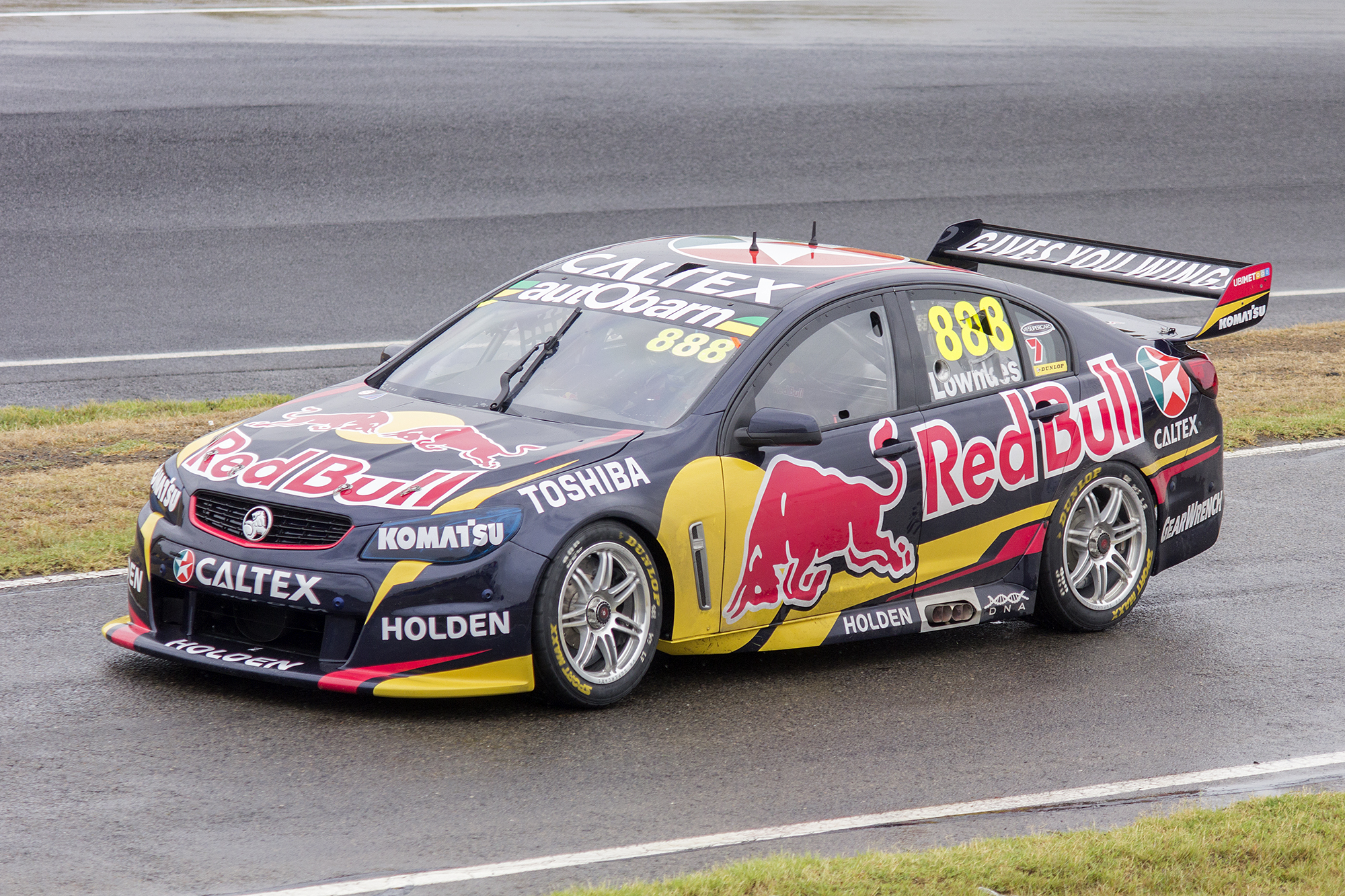
Lowndes at the Sydney Motorsport Park in 2014 during pre-season testing.

=== 2015 ===
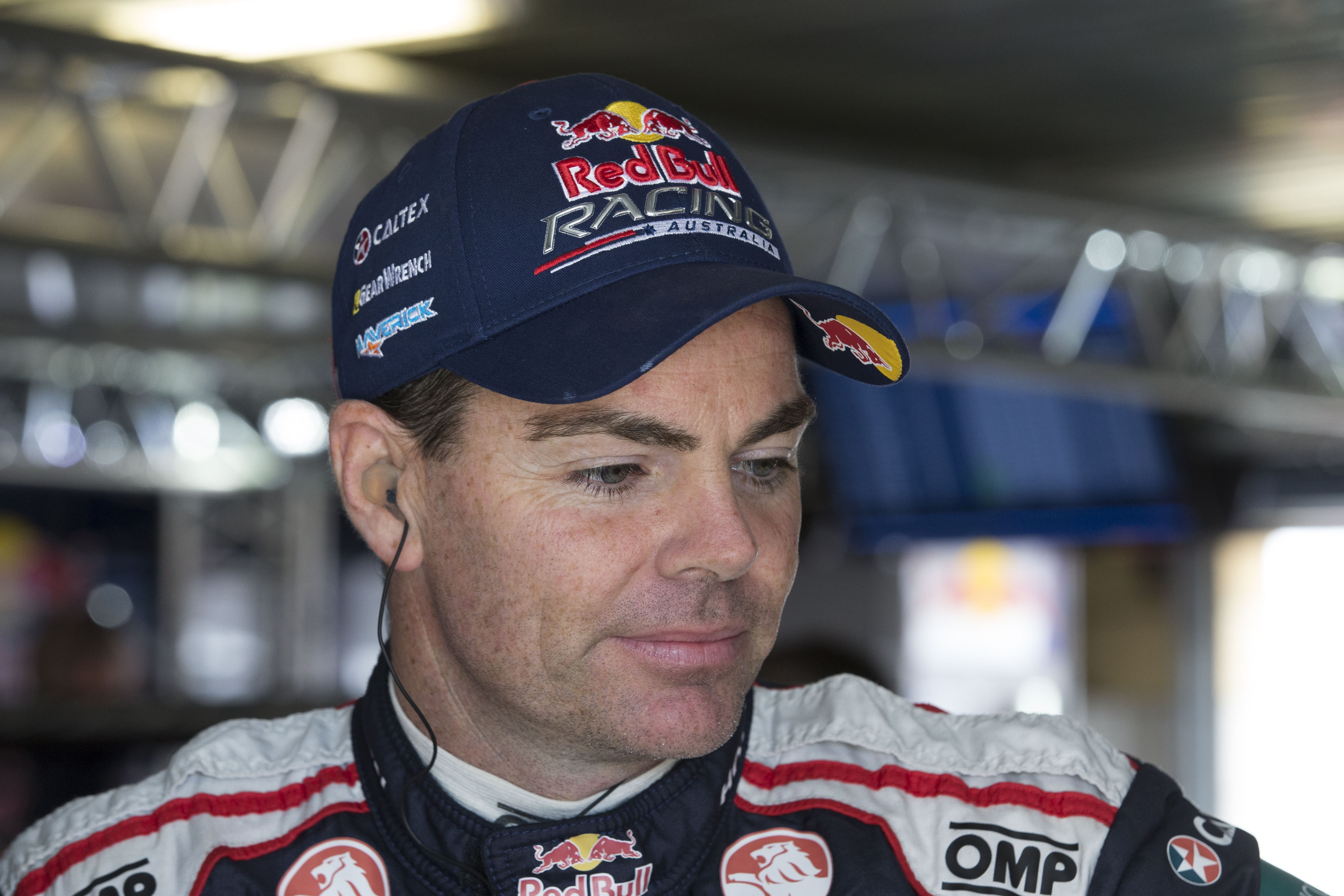
Lowndes in 2015

In 2015, Lowndes became the first driver to reach 100 race wins in the V8 Supercar championship. He capped off a brilliant campaign by placing second in the championship and winning his sixth Supercheap Auto Bathurst 1000 with Steven Richards. In doing so, he equalled all-time greats Mark Skaife and Larry Perkins in terms of number of victories at Mount Panorama, and now stands alone with a record 13th podium at the event. He also scored his 5th Barry Sheene Medal and won the Most Popular Driver award for the third year in succession (since its inception in 2013).

=== 2016 ===
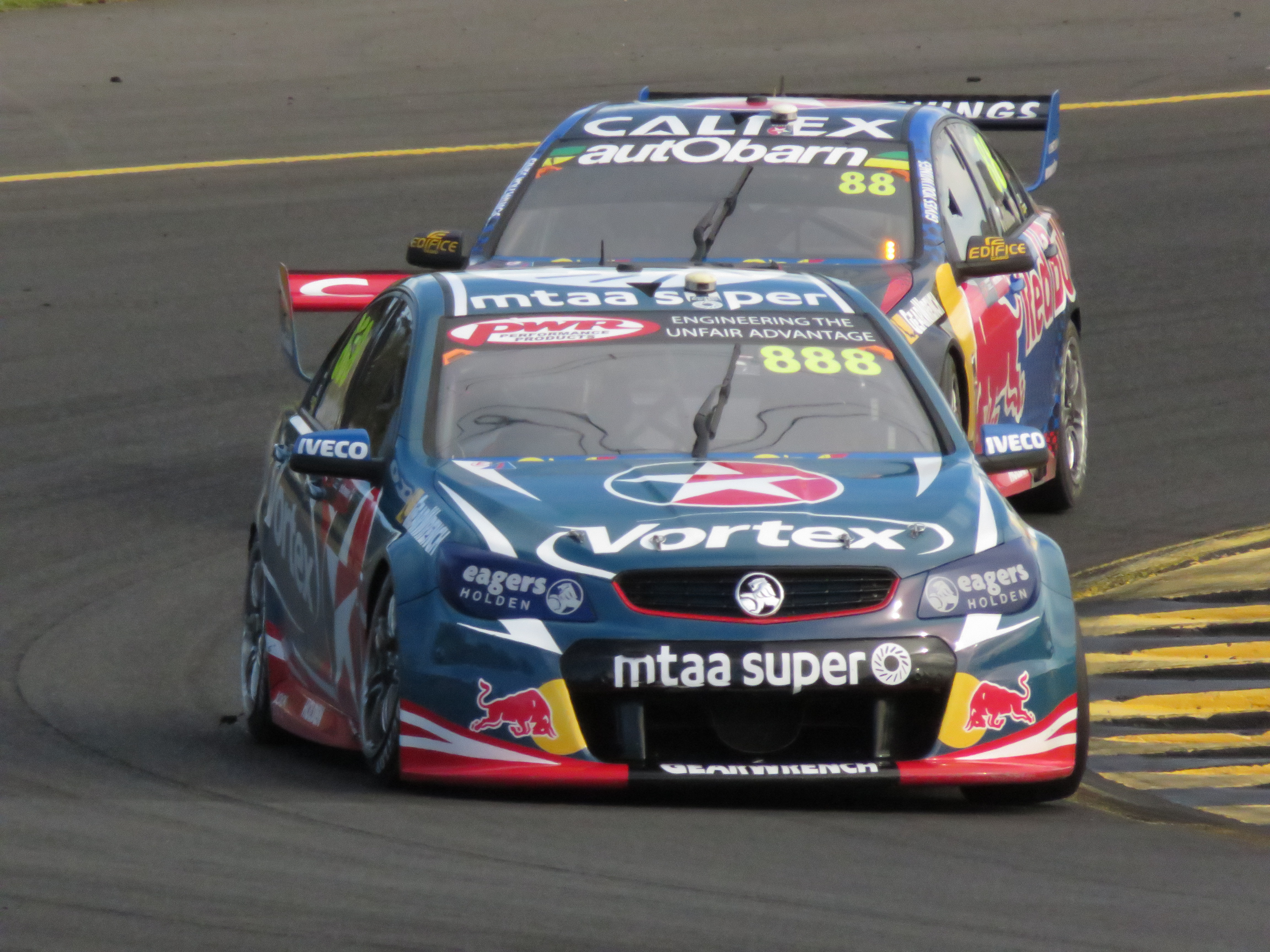
Lowndes in his 600th championship race at the 2016 Sydney SuperSprint

In 2016, Lowndes rejoined long-time Triple Eight Race Engineering technical director Ludo Lacroix as his Engineer under Team Vortex livery Lowndes won his first race of the year at the Perth SuperSprint, where he charged through the field after taking on a two-stop strategy. At the Sydney SuperSprint, Lowndes became the first driver to enter 600 championship races, and after leading the first half of the race, finished second to Whincup, who in the process became the second driver after Lowndes to win 100 races.

=== 2017 ===
2017 saw the continuation of Team Vortex running alongside the newly named Red Bull Holden Racing Team. Despite race wins from both reigning champion Van Gisbergen and crowned champion Whincup, Lowndes for the first time in his career suffered a winless season and also was unable to record a podium finish. Despite the tough season and disappointing outcome of 10th in the championship (his lowest since 2004 and lowest ever with Triple Eight), Lowndes denied retirement and announced his intention to continue racing in 2018.

=== 2018 ===
In January, Lowndes peeled back the covers of the Autobarn Lowndes Racing Holden ZB Commodore in which he would compete in 2018, and also confirmed he would once again be partnered by Steven Richards in the Pirtek Enduro Cup. At Tasmania, Lowndes took his first victory in nearly two years, recording the 106th win of his career in the second leg of the 2018 Tasmania SuperSprint. On 5 July, during the press conference at the Townsville 400, Lowndes announced that he will retire from full-time competition at the end of the 2018 championship. He will remain with Triple Eight Race Engineering as an endurance driver.

On 7 October 2018, Lowndes won his seventh Bathurst 1000 in a record time of 6 hours 1 minute with co-driver Steven Richards. The win equals Steven's father Jim Richards' total of 7 wins. Lowndes and Richards won the Pirtek Enduro Cup award after a strong showing throughout the campaign, including podiums at Sandown and the Gold Coast alongside his Bathurst win. Lowndes is the second driver to win the cup more than once.

2022 onwards

Lowndes continues to race in the Supercars Championship enduro rounds, co-driving in the Supercheap Auto backed 'wildcard' outfit. A program designed to support a young and upcoming driver to step up to the main game in the iconic Bathurst 1000 and lead in event. Previously the Sandown 500 but moving to Tailem Bend from 2025. Stepping in to the program in 2022, it has been the launching pad for previous teammates Declan Fraser, Zane Goddard, Cooper Murray and in 2025 Zach Bates. In 2026, Lowndes Joined Team 18, in a wildcard with Bayley Hall.

== Off-road racing ==
In 2010, Lowndes ventured off-road to compete in the Australasian Safari with a Holden Colorado at his disposal. He won the Rally Raid at his first attempt with a margin of over one hour back to second place. Former V8 Supercar team owner, Kees Weel was co-driver. Lowndes crashed out of the lead of the Safari the following year.

Lowndes participated in the 2021 Finke Desert Race's Prologue, driving a UTV with Triple Eight team principal Mark Dutton as his co-driver. Three years later, he made his official Finke debut in a Chevrolet ZR2 Silverado alongside Dale Moscott. Lowndes won the Prologue and set a new record for the first leg (Alice Springs to Finke) in a production vehicle with a time of 2 hours, 56 minutes, and 692 seconds. However, he was forced to retire on the return leg when the upper control arm's ball joint broke. He returned to Finke in 2026 with the Silverado, winning the Production 4WD class as the only entrant to complete the race.

== Bathurst 12 Hour ==
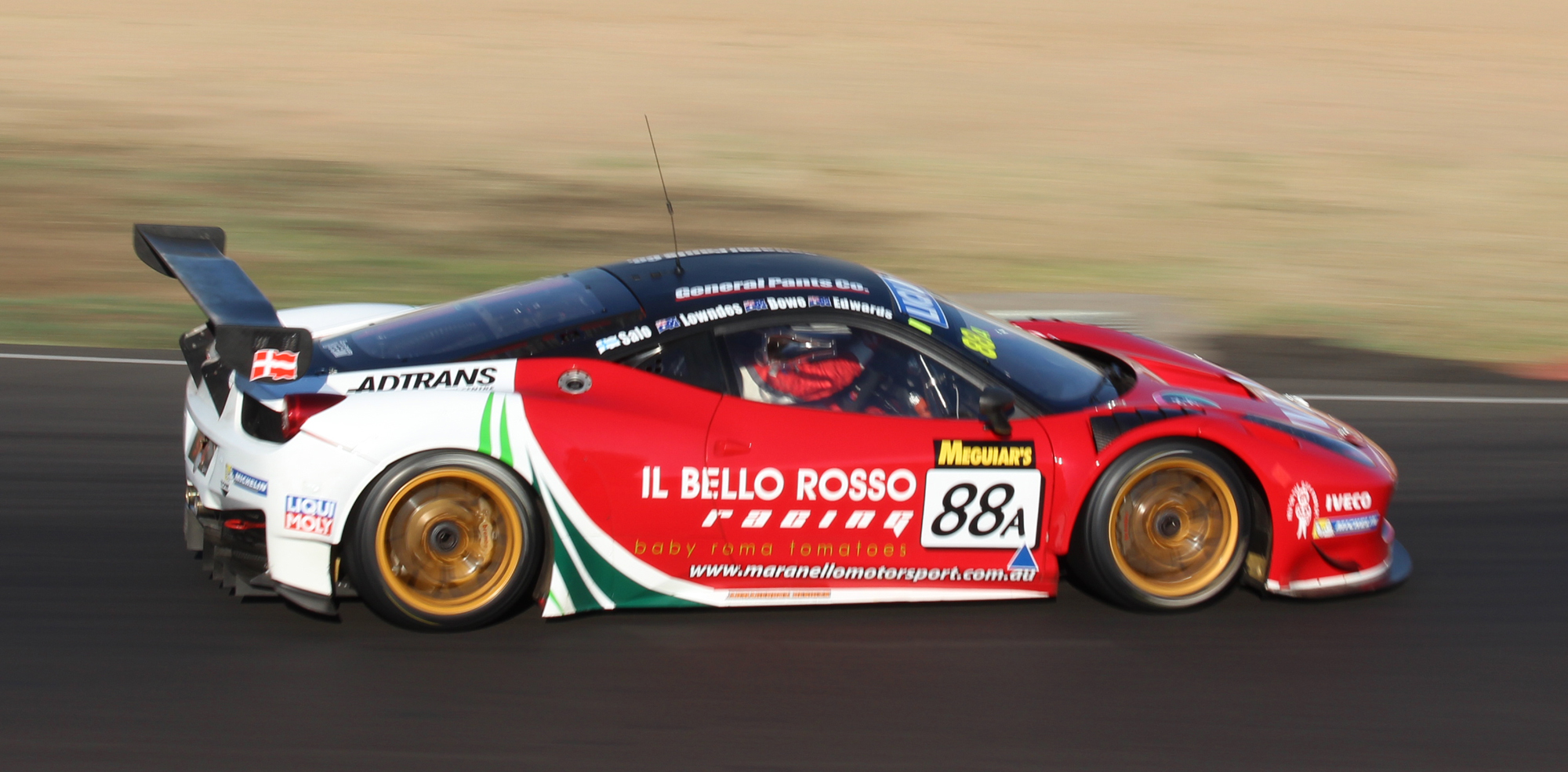
Lowndes at the 2014 Liqui Moly Bathurst 12 Hour

Lowndes' first competitive race at Bathurst was in the 1994 James Hardie 12 Hour for production cars. Sharing a Nissan Pulsar SSS with John and Phil Morriss, Lowndes finished 14th outright and first in Class B.

Since the Bathurst 12 Hour race was changed to allow FIA GT3 cars in 2011, Lowndes has been a regular competitor in the race. In 2011, he finished second outright in an Audi R8 LMS GT3 driving for famed German endurance racing team and multiple 24 Hours of Le Mans winners Joest Racing. In 2012 he failed to finish, again driving an Audi R8, this time for another German team Phoenix Racing, while he also failed to finish in 2013, again in an R8.

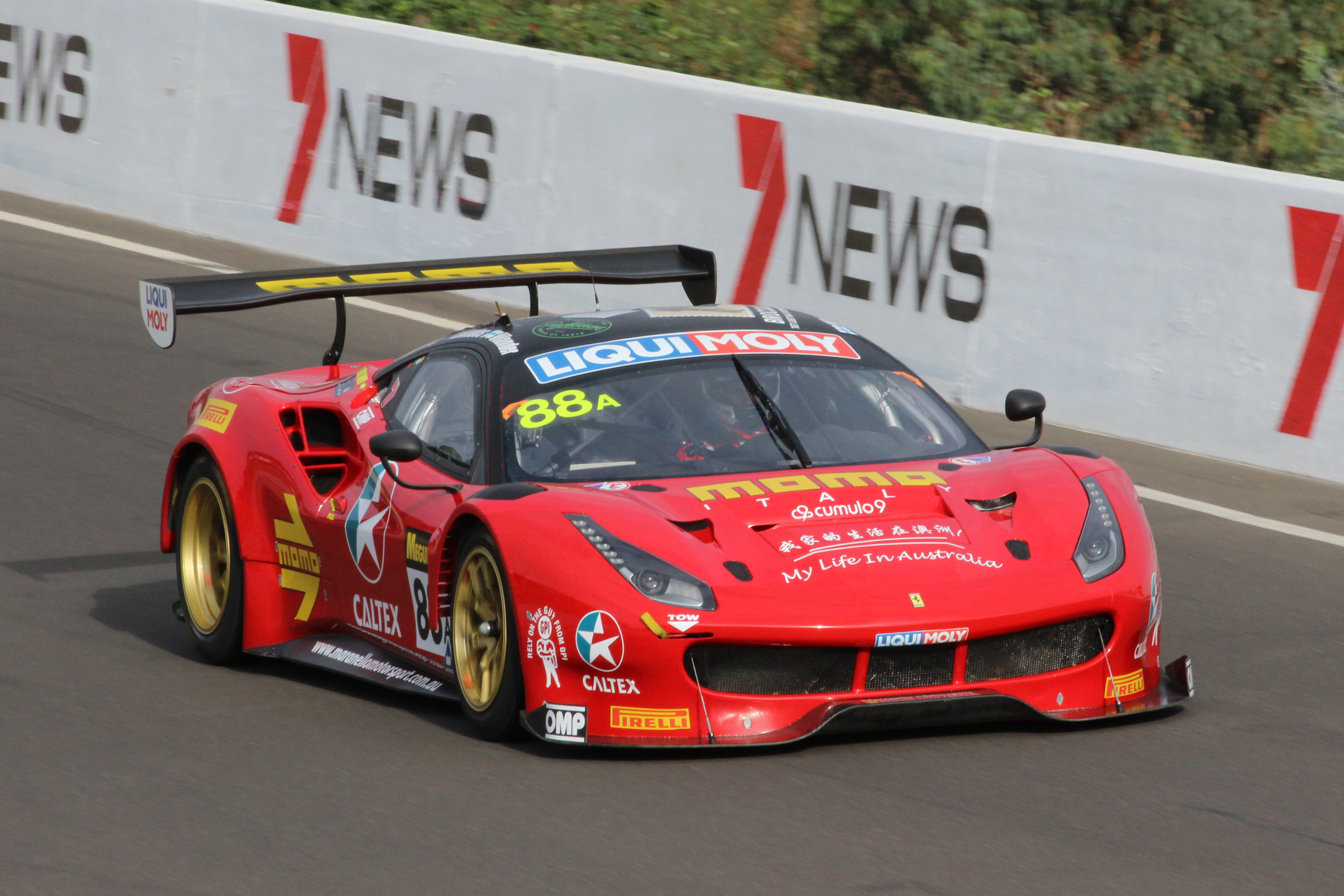
The race-winning Ferrari 488 GT3 of Toni Vilander, Craig Lowndes and Jamie Whincup at the 2017 Liqui Moly Bathurst 12 Hour

Lowndes finally won the race in 2014 driving a Ferrari 458 GT3 for Maranello Motorsport alongside fellow Aussies John Bowe and Peter Edwards, and ex-Formula One driver, Mika Salo of Finland.

On 5 February 2017, Lowndes again drove for Maranello Motorsport to win the 2017 Liqui Moly Bathurst 12 Hour in a Ferrari 488 GT3 alongside Triple Eight teammate Jamie Whincup and another Finnish driver Toni Vilander.

More recently, Lowndes has been a pillar of the Scott Taylor Motorsport entry driving a Mercedes-AMG GT3.

== Awards and honours ==
Among all his other achievements, Lowndes has claimed nine 500 kilometre V8 Supercar/ATCC endurance titles (six Sandown 500 victories, two Phillip Island 500 crowns and one Queensland 500 win). He is also the first driver in ATCC/V8SC history to win 100 races and holds the record for the most Bathurst 1000 podiums with 14.

On 11 June 2012, Lowndes received the Medal of the Order of Australia in the Queen's Birthday Honours List for his success in motorsport and contribution to the broader Australian community, "particularly through road safety education programs and charitable organisations."

In 2018, Lowndes was also recognised in the prestigious Australian Institute of Sport Performance Awards, as the ABC Sports Personality of the Year. On 16 March 2019, Lowndes was inducted into the Australian Motor Sport Hall of Fame.

== Racing record ==
=== Career summary ===
Season	Series	Position	Car	Team
1991	Motorcraft Formula Ford Driver to Europe Series	16th	Van Diemen RF85 Ford	Craig Lowndes
1991	"Champion of Winton" Formula Ford Series	**1st**	Van Diemen RF85 Ford	Craig Lowndes
1992	Motorcraft Formula Ford Driver to Europe Series	5th	Van Diemen RF85 Ford; Reynard FF88 Ford	Northern Tuning Services
1993	Australian Formula Ford Championship	**1st**	Van Diemen RF93 Ford	Craig Lowndes
1994	Australian Drivers' Championship	4th	Cheetah Mk9 Holden	Brian Sampson
1994	Australian Silver Star	**1st**	Cheetah Mk9 Holden	Brian Sampson
1996	Australian Touring Car Championship	**1st**	Holden VR Commodore	Holden Racing Team
1997	International Formula 3000 Championship	17th	Lola T96/50 Zytek	RSM Marko
1998	Australian Touring Car Championship	**1st**	Holden VS Commodore; Holden VT Commodore	Holden Racing Team
1999	Shell Championship Series	**1st**	Holden VT Commodore	Holden Racing Team
2000	Shell Championship Series	**3rd**	Holden VT Commodore	Holden Racing Team
2001	Shell Championship Series	11th	Ford AU Falcon	Gibson Motorsport
2002	V8 Supercar Championship Series	7th	Ford AU Falcon	Gibson Motorsport
2003	V8 Supercar Championship Series	5th	Ford BA Falcon	Ford Performance Racing
2004	V8 Supercar Championship Series	20th	Ford BA Falcon	Ford Performance Racing
2005	V8 Supercar Championship Series	**2nd**	Ford BA Falcon	Triple Eight Race Engineering
2006	V8 Supercar Championship Series	**2nd**	Ford BA Falcon	Triple Eight Race Engineering
2007	V8 Supercar Championship Series	**3rd**	Ford BF Falcon	Triple Eight Race Engineering
2008	V8 Supercar Championship Series	4th	Ford BF Falcon	Triple Eight Race Engineering
2009	V8 Supercar Championship Series	4th	Ford FG Falcon	Triple Eight Race Engineering
2010	V8 Supercar Championship Series	4th	Holden VE Commodore	Triple Eight Race Engineering
2011	International V8 Supercars Championship	**2nd**	Holden VE Commodore	Triple Eight Race Engineering
2012	International V8 Supercars Championship	**2nd**	Holden VE Commodore	Triple Eight Race Engineering
2013	International V8 Supercars Championship	**2nd**	Holden VF Commodore	Triple Eight Race Engineering
2013	Australian GT Championship	28th	Audi R8 LMS Ultra	Melbourne Performance Centre
2014	International V8 Supercars Championship	4th	Holden VF Commodore	Triple Eight Race Engineering
2014	Australian GT Championship	24th	Chevrolet Camaro GT3	Interislander
2015	International V8 Supercars Championship	**2nd**	Holden VF Commodore	Triple Eight Race Engineering
2016	International V8 Supercars Championship	4th	Holden VF Commodore	Triple Eight Race Engineering
2017	Virgin Australia Supercars Championship	10th	Holden VF Commodore	Triple Eight Race Engineering
2017	Australian Tourist Trophy	**1st**	Ferrari 488 GT3	Maranello Motorsport
2018	Virgin Australia Supercars Championship	4th	Holden ZB Commodore	Triple Eight Race Engineering
2019	Virgin Australia Supercars Championship	25th	Holden ZB Commodore	Triple Eight Race Engineering
2020	Virgin Australia Supercars Championship	NC	Holden ZB Commodore	Triple Eight Race Engineering
2021	Repco Supercars Championship	31st	Holden ZB Commodore	Triple Eight Race Engineering
2022	Supercars Championship	37th	Holden ZB Commodore	Triple Eight Race Engineering
2023	Supercars Championship	43rd	Chevrolet Camaro ZL1	Triple Eight Race Engineering
2024	Supercars Championship	32nd	Chevrolet Camaro ZL1	Triple Eight Race Engineering
2025	Supercars Championship	28th	Chevrolet Camaro ZL1	Triple Eight Race Engineering

=== Supercars Championship results ===
Supercars results
Year	Team	Car	1	2	3	4	5	6	7	8	9	10	11	12	13	14	15	16	17	18	19	20	21	22	23	24	25	26	27	28	29	30	31	32	33	34	35	36	37	38	39	Position	Points
1996	Holden Racing Team	Holden VR Commodore	EAS; R1; 2	EAS; R2; 1	**EAS**; **R3**; **1**	SAN; R4; 1	**SAN**; **R5**; **4**	SAN; R6; 3	BAT; R7; 4	BAT; R8; Ret	BAT; R9; 10	**SYM**; **R10**; **1**	**SYM**; **R11**; **1**	**SYM**; **R12**; **1**	PHI; R13; 1	PHI; R14; Ret	PHI; R15; DNS	**CAL**; **R16**; **1**	**CAL**; **R17**; **Ret**	CAL; R18; 7	LAK; R19; 1	**LAK**; **R20**; **1**	**LAK**; **R21**; **1**	**BAR**; **R22**; **1**	**BAR**; **R23**; **1**	**BAR**; **R24**; **1**	MAL; R25; 1	**MAL**; **R26**; **1**	**MAL**; **R27**; **5**	ORA; R28; 2	ORA; R29; 2	ORA; R30; Ret										1st	423
1998	Holden Racing Team	Holden VS Commodore	SAN; R1; 2	SAN; R2; 1	SAN; R3; 1	SYM; R4; 3	SYM; R5; 1	SYM; R6; 1	LAK; R7; 6	LAK; R8; 4	LAK; R9; 4	PHI; R10; 2	PHI; R11; 1	PHI; R12; 2	WIN; R13; 4	WIN; R14; 3	WIN; R15; Ret	MAL; R16; 3	MAL; R17; 3	MAL; R18; 1	BAR; R19; 1	BAR; R20; 1	BAR; R21; 1	CAL; R22; 1	CAL; R23; 2	CAL; R24; C	HID; R25; 1	HID; R26; DNS	HID; R27; 6	ORA; R28; 1	ORA; R29; 1	ORA; R30; 1										1st	992
1999	Holden Racing Team	Holden VT Commodore	EAS; R1; 3	EAS; R2; 2	EAS; R3; 1	ADE; R4; 1	BAR; R5; 1	BAR; R6; 1	BAR; R7; 1	PHI; R8; 2	PHI; R9; 2	PHI; R10; 1	HID; R11; 3	HID; R12; 3	HID; R13; Ret	SAN; R14; 2	SAN; R15; 2	SAN; R16; 1	QLD; R17; 3	QLD; R18; 1	QLD; R19; 5	CAL; R20; 1	CAL; R21; Ret	CAL; R22; DNS	SYM; R23	SYM; R24	SYM; R25	WIN; R26; 16	WIN; R27; 7	WIN; R28; 5	ORA; R29; 2	ORA; R30; 2	ORA; R31; 2	QLD; R32; 3	BAT; R33; 2							1st	1918
2000	Holden Racing Team	Holden VT Commodore	**PHI**; **R1**; **1**	**PHI**; **R2**; **Ret**	BAR; R3; 1	**BAR**; **R4**; **1**	**BAR**; **R5**; **1**	ADE; R6; 1	**ADE**; **R7**; **Ret**	EAS; R8; 2	EAS; R9; 3	EAS; R10; 18	**HID**; **R11**; **2**	HID; R12; 22	HID; R13; Ret	CAN; R14; 13	CAN; R15; 10	CAN; R16; 1	**QLD**; **R17**; **1**	**QLD**; **R18**; **1**	**QLD**; **R19**; **1**	WIN; R20; 4	WIN; R21; 5	WIN; R22; 17	ORA; R23; 2	ORA; R24; Ret	ORA; R25; 9	**CAL**; **R26**; **3**	CAL; R27; 4	CAL; R28; 7	QLD; R29; 1	**SAN**; **R30**; **2**	SAN; R31; 4	SAN; R32; 4	BAT; R33; 6							3rd	1310
2001	Gibson Motorsport	Ford AU Falcon	PHI; R1; 3	PHI; R2; 2	ADE; R3; 1	**ADE**; **R4**; **Ret**	EAS; R5; 12	EAS; R6; 5	HID; R7; 20	HID; R8; Ret	HID; R9; DNS	CAN; R10; 2	CAN; R11; 6	CAN; R12; Ret	BAR; R13; 6	BAR; R14; 6	BAR; R15; 5	CAL; R16; 13	CAL; R17; 15	CAL; R18; 14	**ORA**; **R19**; **2**	ORA; R20; 7	QLD; R21; Ret	WIN; R22; Ret	WIN; R23; 19	BAT; R24; 17	PUK; R25; 24	PUK; R26; 10	PUK; R27; 8	SAN; R28; 2	SAN; R29; 3	SAN; R30; 1										11th	1991
2002	Gibson Motorsport	Ford AU Falcon	ADE; R1; 4	ADE; R2; 4	PHI; R3; 12	PHI; R4; Ret	EAS; R5; 9	EAS; R6; 3	EAS; R7; 2	HDV; R8; 6	HDV; R9; Ret	HDV; R10; Ret	CAN; R11; 9	CAN; R12; 16	CAN; R13; 3	BAR; R14; 5	BAR; R15; 28	BAR; R16; 17	ORA; R17; 12	ORA; R18; 7	WIN; R19; 25	WIN; R20; Ret	QLD; R21; 6	BAT; R22; 5	SUR; R23; 3	SUR; R24; 2	PUK; R25; 8	PUK; R26; 9	PUK; R27; Ret	SAN; R28; 7	SAN; R29; 17											7th	1051
2003	Ford Performance Racing	Ford BA Falcon	ADE; R1; Ret	ADE; R1; 7	PHI; R3; 1	EAS; R4; 2	WIN; R5; 10	BAR; R6; 6	BAR; R7; Ret	BAR; R8; 17	HDV; R9; 28	HDV; R10; 27	HDV; R11; 15	QLD; R12; 6	ORA; R13; 2	SAN; R14; 16	BAT; R15; 2	SUR; R16; 15	SUR; R17; 9	PUK; R18; 16	PUK; R19; 12	PUK; R20; 18	EAS; R21; 6	EAS; R22; 4																		5th	1756
2004	Ford Performance Racing	Ford BA Falcon	ADE; R1; Ret	ADE; R2; Ret	EAS; R3; 2	PUK; R4; 8	PUK; R5; 29	PUK; R6; Ret	HDV; R7; 12	HDV; R8; 5	HDV; R9; 9	BAR; R10; 21	BAR; R11; Ret	BAR; R12; DNS	QLD; R13; Ret	WIN; R14; 27	ORA; R15; 19	ORA; R16; 26	SAN; R17; 18	BAT; R18; 2	SUR; R19; 4	SUR; R20; Ret	SYM; R21; 6	SYM; R22; 6	SYM; R23; 13	EAS; R24; 2	EAS; R25; 3	EAS; R26; Ret														20th	1182
2005	Triple Eight Race Engineering	Ford BA Falcon	ADE; R1; 3	ADE; R2; 2	PUK; R3; 14	PUK; R4; 5	PUK; R5; Ret	BAR; R6; 21	BAR; R7; 3	BAR; R8; Ret	EAS; R9; 2	EAS; R10; 1	SHA; R11; 4	SHA; R12; Ret	SHA; R13; Ret	HDV; R14; 3	HDV; R15; 32	HDV; R16; 11	QLD; R17; 1	ORA; R18; 9	ORA; R19; 4	SAN; R20; 1	BAT; R21; 15	SUR; R22; 2	SUR; R23; 1	SUR; R24; 1	SYM; R25; 5	SYM; R26; 3	SYM; R27; 3	PHI; R28; 1	PHI; R29; 3	PHI; R30; 15										2nd	1865
2006	Triple Eight Race Engineering	Ford BA Falcon	ADE; R1; 1	**ADE**; **R2**; **Ret**	PUK; R3; 5	PUK; R4; 17	PUK; R5; 2	BAR; R6; 3	BAR; R7; 14	BAR; R8; 2	WIN; R9; 2	WIN; R10; 8	WIN; R11; 1	HDV; R12; 4	HDV; R13; 3	HDV; R14; 1	QLD; R15; 4	QLD; R16; 5	QLD; R17; 4	ORA; R18; 2	ORA; R19; 2	ORA; R20; 1	SAN; R21; 3	BAT; R22; 1	SUR; R23; 11	SUR; R24; 7	SUR; R25; 14	SYM; R26; 27	SYM; R27; 9	SYM; R28; 7	BHR; R29; 9	BHR; R30; 5	BHR; R31; 3	PHI; R32; 4	PHI; R33; 3	PHI; R34; 29						2nd	3271
2007	Triple Eight Race Engineering	Ford BF Falcon	ADE; R1; 13	ADE; R2; 11	BAR; R3; 4	BAR; R4; 8	BAR; R5; 8	PUK; R6; 14	PUK; R7; 7	PUK; R8; 4	WIN; R9; 18	WIN; R10; 6	WIN; R11; 5	EAS; R12; 9	EAS; R13; 4	EAS; R14; 2	HDV; R15; 3	HDV; R16; 1	**HDV**; **R17**; **1**	QLD; R18; 5	QLD; R19; 3	QLD; R20; 2	ORA; R21; 7	ORA; R22; 1	**ORA**; **R23**; **14**	SAN; R24; 1	BAT; R25; 1	SUR; R26; 3	SUR; R27; 24	SUR; R28; 7	BHR; R29; Ret	BHR; R30; 5	BHR; R31; 1	SYM; R32; 5	SYM; R33; 6	SYM; R34; 5	PHI; R35; 4	PHI; R36; 6	PHI; R37; 3			3rd	592
2008	Triple Eight Race Engineering	Ford BF Falcon	ADE; R1; 3	ADE; R2; Ret	EAS; R3; 7	EAS; R4; 3	EAS; R5; 8	HAM; R6; 19	HAM; R7; 14	HAM; R8; 7	BAR; R29; 5	BAR; R10; 4	BAR; R11; 4	SAN; R12; 3	SAN; R13; 1	**SAN**; **R14**; **DNS**	HDV; R15; 5	HDV; R16; 4	HDV; R17; Ret	QLD; R18; 28	QLD; R19; 12	QLD; R20; 7	WIN; R21; 1	**WIN**; **R22**; **5**	WIN; R23; 6	PHI; QR; 1	**PHI**; **R24**; **2**	BAT; R25; 1	SUR; R26; 6	SUR; R27; 9	SUR; R28; 9	BHR; R29; 2	BHR; R30; 3	BHR; R31; 3	SYM; R32; 6	SYM; R33; 2	SYM; R34; 2	ORA; R35; 2	ORA; R36; 5	ORA; R37; 3		4th	2871
2009	Triple Eight Race Engineering	Ford FG Falcon	ADE; R1; 19	ADE; R2; 4	HAM; R3; 24	HAM; R4; Ret	WIN; R5; 1	WIN; R6; 1	SYM; R7; 7	SYM; R8; 10	HDV; R9; 6	HDV; R10; 3	TOW; R11; 4	TOW; R12; 9	SAN; R13; 3	SAN; R14; 5	QLD; R15; Ret	QLD; R16; 2	PHI; QR; 18	PHI; R17; 2	BAT; R18; 5	SUR; R19; 4	SUR; R20; 4	SUR; R21; 1	**SUR**; **R22**; **13**	PHI; R23; 28	PHI; R24; 7	**BAR**; **R25**; **6**	BAR; R26; 1	SYD; R27; 19	SYD; R28; Ret											4th	2592
2010	Triple Eight Race Engineering	Holden VE Commodore	YMC; R1; 2	YMC; R2; 5	BHR; R3; 3	BHR; R4; 12	ADE; R5; 19	ADE; R6; 16	HAM; R7; 4	HAM; R8; 19	QLD; R9; 2	QLD; R10; 5	WIN; R11; 2	WIN; R12; 2	HDV; R13; 7	HDV; R14; 5	TOW; R15; 26	TOW; R16; Ret	PHI; QR; 2	PHI; R17; 1	BAT; R18; 1	SUR; R19; 2	SUR; R20; 10	SYM; R21; 1	SYM; R22; Ret	SAN; R23; 8	SAN; R24; 11	SYD; R25; Ret	SYD; R26; 6													4th	2669
2011	Triple Eight Race Engineering	Holden VE Commodore	**YMC**; **R1**; **7**	YMC; R2; 21	ADE; R3; 3	ADE; R4; 12	HAM; R5; 2	HAM; R6; 10	BAR; R7; 2	BAR; R8; 4	BAR; R9; 4	**WIN**; **R10**; **11**	WIN; R11; 7	HID; R12; 3	HID; R13; 2	TOW; R14; 4	**TOW**; **R15**; **2**	**QLD**; **R16**; **1**	**QLD**; **R17**; **1**	**QLD**; **R18**; **1**	PHI; QR; 6	PHI; R19; 1	BAT; R20; 2	SUR; R21; Ret	SUR; R22; 20	SYM; R23; 2	SYM; R24; 5	SAN; R25; 6	SAN; R26; 4	SYD; R27; 1	SYD; R28; 2											2nd	3133
2012	Triple Eight Race Engineering	Holden VE Commodore	**ADE**; **R1**; **4**	ADE; R2; 5	SYM; R3; 5	**SYM**; **R4**; **Ret**	HAM; R5; 4	HAM; R6; 4	BAR; R7; 3	BAR; R8; 6	BAR; R9; 6	PHI; R10; 15	**PHI**; **R11**; **2**	HID; R12; 4	HID; R13; 1	TOW; R14; 5	TOW; R15; 2	**QLD**; **R16**; **1**	QLD; R17; 1	SMP; R18; 1	**SMP**; **R19**; **2**	SAN; QR; 7	SAN; R20; 1	BAT; R21; 3	SUR; R22; 6	SUR; R23; 6	YMC; R24; 8	YMC; R25; 11	YMC; R26; 11	WIN; R27; 2	WIN; R28; 1	SYD; R29; 1	SYD; R30; 2									2nd	3522
2013	Triple Eight Race Engineering	Holden VF Commodore	ADE; R1; 1	ADE; R2; 3	SYM; R3; 26	SYM; R4; 10	SYM; R5; 11	PUK; R6; 3	PUK; R7; 16	PUK; R8; 4	PUK; R9; 9	BAR; R10; 1	BAR; R11; 8	BAR; R12; 2	COA; R13; 2	COA; R14; 2	COA; R15; 2	COA; R16; 5	HID; R17; 26	HID; R18; 3	HID; R19; 1	TOW; R20; 4	TOW; R21; 7	QLD; R22; 4	QLD; R23; 12	QLD; R24; 6	WIN; R25; 21	WIN; R26; 12	WIN; R27; 10	SAN; QR; 3	SAN; R28; 2	BAT; R29; 3	**SUR**; **R30**; **1**	SUR; R31; 8	PHI; R32; 8	PHI; R33; 1	PHI; R34; 3	SYD; R35; 15	SYD; R36; 5			2nd	2966
2014	Triple Eight Race Engineering	Holden VF Commodore	ADE; R1; 2	**ADE**; **R2**; **1**	ADE; R3; 2	SYM; R4; 8	SYM; R5; 5	SYM; R6; 1	WIN; R7; 8	WIN; R8; 16	WIN; R9; 7	PUK; R10; 3	PUK; R11; 16	PUK; R12; 10	PUK; R13; 20	BAR; R14; 6	**BAR**; **R15**; **1**	**BAR**; **R16**; **2**	HID; R17; 2	HID; R18; 2	**HID**; **R19**; **17**	TOW; R20; Ret	TOW; R21; 6	TOW; R22; 23	**QLD**; **R23**; **2**	QLD; R24; 2	QLD; R25; 2	SMP; R26; 3	SMP; R27; 11	SMP; R28; 9	SAN; QR; 7	SAN; R29; 4	BAT; R30; 10	SUR; R31; 17	SUR; R32; 11	PHI; R33; 2	PHI; R34; 2	PHI; R35; 10	SYD; R36; 13	SYD; R37; 20	SYD; R38; 17	4th	2659
2015	Triple Eight Race Engineering	Holden VF Commodore	ADE; R1; 4	ADE; R2; 3	ADE; R3; 9	**SYM**; **R4**; **1**	**SYM**; **R5**; **1**	**SYM**; **R6**; **6**	BAR; R7; 3	BAR; R8; 5	BAR; R9; 2	WIN; R10; 12	WIN; R11; 8	WIN; R12; 3	HID; R13; 18	HID; R14; 1	HID; R15; 15	TOW; R16; 14	TOW; R17; 9	QLD; R18; 3	**QLD**; **R19**; **2**	QLD; R20; 2	SMP; R21; 5	SMP; R22; 10	SMP; R23; 10	SAN; QR; 23	SAN; R24; 13	BAT; R25; 1	SUR; R26; 3	SUR; R27; 4	PUK; R28; 4	PUK; R29; Ret	PUK; R30; 2	PHI; R31; 1	PHI; R32; 3	PHI; R33; 1	SYD; R34; 15	SYD; R35; 7	SYD; R36; 6			2nd	3008
2016	Triple Eight Race Engineering	Holden VF Commodore	ADE; R1; 7	ADE; R2; 10	ADE; R3; 13	SYM; R4; 5	SYM; R5; 2	PHI; R6; 6	PHI; R7; 5	BAR; R8; 1	BAR; R9; 3	WIN; R10; 15	WIN; R11; 8	HID; R12; 11	HID; R13; 3	TOW; R14; 12	TOW; R15; 10	QLD; R16; 3	QLD; R17; 1	SMP; R18; 6	SMP; R19; 2	SAN; QR; 12	SAN; R20; 8	BAT; R21; 16	SUR; R22; 6	SUR; R23; 4	PUK; R24; 16	PUK; R25; 15	PUK; R26; 4	PUK; R27; 6	SYD; R28; 8	SYD; R29; 9										4th	2770
2017	Triple Eight Race Engineering	Holden VF Commodore	ADE; R1; 8	ADE; R2; 10	SYM; R3; 3	SYM; R4; 4	PHI; R5; 12	PHI; R6; 23	BAR; R7; 7	BAR; R8; 8	WIN; R9; 6	WIN; R10; 15	HID; R11; 7	HID; R12; 6	TOW; R13; 6	TOW; R14; 10	QLD; R15; 5	QLD; R16; 6	SMP; R17; 7	SMP; R18; 24	SAN; QR; DNF	SAN; R19; 11	BAT; R20; 11	SUR; R21; 7	SUR; R22; 4	PUK; R23; 8	PUK; R24; 4	NEW; R25; Ret	NEW; R26; Ret													10th	2160
2018	Triple Eight Race Engineering	Holden ZB Commodore	ADE; R1; 9	ADE; R2; 7	MEL; R3; 16	MEL; R4; Ret	MEL; R5; 6	MEL; R6; 12	SYM; R7; 2	**SYM**; **R8**; **1**	PHI; R9; 4	PHI; R10; 7	BAR; R11; 5	BAR; R12; 3	WIN; R13; 13	WIN; R14; 12	HID; R15; 7	HID; R16; 10	TOW; R17; 4	TOW; R18; 4	QLD; R19; 3	QLD; R20; 8	SMP; R21; 4	BEN; R22; 10	BEN; R23; 8	SAN; QR; 10	SAN; R24; 3	BAT; R25; 1	SUR; R26; 2	SUR; R27; C	PUK; R28; 11	PUK; R29; 4	NEW; R30; 23	NEW; R31; 11								4th	3225
2019	Triple Eight Race Engineering	Holden ZB Commodore	ADE; R1	ADE; R2	MEL; R3	MEL; R4	MEL; R5	MEL; R6	SYM; R7	SYM; R8	PHI; R9	PHI; R10	BAR; R11	BAR; R12	WIN; R13	WIN; R14	HID; R15	HID; R16	TOW; R17	TOW; R18	QLD; R19	QLD; R20	BEN; R21	BEN; R22	PUK; R23	PUK; R24	BAT; R25; 4	SUR; R26; 1	SUR; R27; 2	SAN; QR; 1	**SAN**; **R28**; **1**	NEW; R29	NEW; R30									25th	828
2020	Triple Eight Race Engineering	Holden ZB Commodore	ADE; R1	ADE; R2	MEL; R3	MEL; R4	MEL; R5	MEL; R6	SMP1; R7	SMP1; R8	SMP1; R9	SMP2; R10	SMP2; R11	SMP2; R12	HID1; R13	HID1; R14	HID1; R15	HID2; R16	HID2; R17	HID2; R18	TOW1; R19	TOW1; R20	TOW1; R21	TOW2; R22	TOW2; R23	TOW2; R24	BEN1; R25	BEN1; R26	BEN1; R27	BEN2; R28	BEN2; R29	BEN2; R30	BAT; R31; Ret									NC	0
2021	Triple Eight Race Engineering	Holden ZB Commodore	BAT1; R1	BAT1; R2	SAN; R3	SAN; R4	SAN; R5	SYM; R6	SYM; R7	SYM; R8	BEN; R9	BEN; R10	BEN; R11	HID; R12	HID; R13	HID; R14	TOW1; R15	TOW1; R16	TOW2; R17	TOW2; R18	TOW2; R19	SMP1; R20	SMP1; R21	SMP1; R22	SMP2; R23	SMP2; R24	SMP2; R25	SMP3; R26	SMP3; R27	SMP3; R28	SMP4; R29	SMP4; R30	BAT2; R31; 4									31st	240
2022	Triple Eight Race Engineering	Holden ZB Commodore	SYD; R1	SYD; R2	SYM; R6	SYM; R7	SYM; R8	MEL; R6	MEL; R7	MEL; R8	MEL; R9	WAN; R10	WAN; R11	WAN; R12	WIN; R13	WIN; R14	WIN; R15	HID; R16	HID; R17	HID; R18	TOW; R19	TOW; R20	BEN; R21	BEN; R22	BEN; R23	SAN; R24	SAN; R25	SAN; R26	PUK; R27	PUK; R28	PUK; R29	BAT; R30; 8	SUR; R31	SUR; R32	ADE; R33	ADE; R34						37th	180
2023	Triple Eight Race Engineering	Chevrolet Camaro ZL1	NEW; R1	NEW; R2	MEL; R3	MEL; R4	MEL; R5	MEL; R6	BAR; R7	BAR; R8	BAR; R9	SYM; R10	SYM; R11	SYM; R12	HID; R13	HID; R14	HID; R15	TOW; R16	TOW; R17	SMP; R18	SMP; R19	BEN; R20	BEN; R21	BEN; R22	SAN; R23; 10	BAT; R24; 24	SUR; R25	SUR; R26	ADE; R27	ADE; R28												43rd	222
2024	Triple Eight Race Engineering	Chevrolet Camaro ZL1	BAT1; R1	BAT1; R2	MEL; R3	MEL; R4	MEL; R5	MEL; R6	TAU; R7	TAU; R8	BAR; R9	BAR; R10	HID; R11	HID; R12	TOW; R13	TOW; R14	SMP; R15	SMP; R16	BEN; R17	BEN; R18	SAN; R19; 5	BAT; R20; 14	SUR; R21	SUR; R22	ADE; R23	ADE; R24																32nd	348
2025	Triple Eight Race Engineering	Chevrolet Camaro ZL1	SYD; R1	SYD; R2	SYD; R3	MEL; R4	MEL; R5	MEL; R6	MEL; R7	TAU; R8	TAU; R9	TAU; R10	SYM; R11	SYM; R12	SYM; R13	BAR; R14	BAR; R15	BAR; R16	HID; R17	HID; R18	HID; R19	TOW; R20	TOW; R21	TOW; R22	QLD; R23	QLD; R24	QLD; R25	BEN; R26; 16	BAT; R27; 10	SUR; R28	SUR; R29	SAN; R30	SAN; R31	ADE; R32	ADE; R33	ADE; R34						28th	228
2026	Team 18	Chevrolet Camaro ZL1	SMP; R1	SMP; R2	SMP; R3	MEL; R4	MEL; R5	MEL; R6	MEL; R7	TAU; R8	TAU; R9	TAU; R10	CHR; R11	CHR; R12	CHR; R13	SYM; R14	SYM; R15	SYM; R16	BAR; R17	BAR; R18	BAR; R19	HID; R20	HID; R21	HID; R22	TOW; R23	TOW; R24	TOW; R25	QLD; R26	QLD; R27	QLD; R28	BEN; R28	BAT; R30	SUR; R31	SUR; R32	SAN; R33	SAN; R34	ADE; R35	ADE; R36	ADE; R37				

=== Bathurst 1000 results ===
Year	Team	Car	Co-driver	Position	Laps
1994	Holden Racing Team	Holden Commodore VP	(Australia) Brad Jones	**2nd**	161
1995	Holden Racing Team	Holden Commodore VR	(New Zealand) Greg Murphy	DNF	10
1996	Holden Racing Team	Holden Commodore VR	(New Zealand) Greg Murphy	**1st**	161
1997	Holden Racing Team	Holden Commodore VS	(New Zealand) Greg Murphy	DNF	38
1998	Holden Racing Team	Holden Commodore VT	(Australia) Mark Skaife	6th	159
1999	Holden Racing Team	Holden Commodore VT	(Australia) Cameron McConville	**2nd**	161
2000	Holden Racing Team	Holden Commodore VT	(Australia) Mark Skaife	6th	161
2001	Gibson Motorsport	Ford Falcon AU	(Australia) Neil Crompton	17th	156
2002	00 Motorsport	Ford Falcon AU	(Australia) Neil Crompton	DNF	127
2003	Ford Performance Racing	Ford Falcon BA	(Australia) Glenn Seton	**2nd**	161
2004	Ford Performance Racing	Ford Falcon BA	(Australia) Glenn Seton	**2nd**	161
2005	Triple Eight Race Engineering	Ford Falcon BA	(France) Yvan Muller	15th	151
2006	Triple Eight Race Engineering	Ford Falcon BA	(Australia) Jamie Whincup	**1st**	161
2007	Triple Eight Race Engineering	Ford Falcon BF	(Australia) Jamie Whincup	**1st**	161
2008	Triple Eight Race Engineering	Ford Falcon BF	(Australia) Jamie Whincup	**1st**	161
2009	Triple Eight Race Engineering	Ford Falcon FG	(Australia) Jamie Whincup	5th	161
2010	Triple Eight Race Engineering	Holden Commodore VE	(Australia) Mark Skaife	**1st**	161
2011	Triple Eight Race Engineering	Holden Commodore VE	(Australia) Mark Skaife	**2nd**	161
2012	Triple Eight Race Engineering	Holden Commodore VE	(Australia) Warren Luff	**3rd**	161
2013	Triple Eight Race Engineering	Holden Commodore VF	(Australia) Warren Luff	**3rd**	161
2014	Triple Eight Race Engineering	Holden Commodore VF	(New Zealand) Steven Richards	10th	161
2015	Triple Eight Race Engineering	Holden Commodore VF	(New Zealand) Steven Richards	**1st**	161
2016	Triple Eight Race Engineering	Holden Commodore VF	(New Zealand) Steven Richards	16th	156
2017	Triple Eight Race Engineering	Holden Commodore VF	(New Zealand) Steven Richards	11th	160
2018	Triple Eight Race Engineering	Holden Commodore ZB	(New Zealand) Steven Richards	**1st**	161
2019	Triple Eight Race Engineering	Holden Commodore ZB	(Australia) Jamie Whincup	4th	161
2020	Triple Eight Race Engineering	Holden Commodore ZB	(Australia) Jamie Whincup	DNF	32
2021	Triple Eight Race Engineering	Holden Commodore ZB	(Australia) Jamie Whincup	4th	161
2022	Triple Eight Race Engineering	Holden Commodore ZB	(Australia) Declan Fraser	8th	161
2023	Triple Eight Race Engineering	Chevrolet Camaro Mk.6	(Australia) Zane Goddard	24th	141
2024	Triple Eight Race Engineering	Chevrolet Camaro Mk.6	(Australia) Cooper Murray	14th	161
2025	Triple Eight Race Engineering	Chevrolet Camaro Mk.6	(Australia) Zach Bates	10th	161
2026	Team 18	Chevrolet Camaro Mk.6	(Australia) Bayley Hall	10th	161

=== Complete International Formula 3000 results ===
(key) (Races in bold indicate pole position) (Races in italics indicate fastest lap)

Year	Entrant	1	2	3	4	5	6	7	8	9	10	DC	Points
1997	RSM Marko	SIL; 14	PAU; Ret	HEL; Ret	NÜR; Ret	PER; 4	HOC; Ret	A1R; Ret	SPA; Ret	MUG; 21	JER; 9	**17th**	**3**

=== Complete Bathurst 12 Hour results ===
Year	Team	Co-drivers	Car	Class	Laps	Overall position	Class position
1994	(Australia) John Morriss	(Australia) John Morriss (Australia) Phil Morriss	Nissan Pulsar SSS	B	236	14th	**1st**
2011	(Germany) Joest Racing; Audi Australia	(Australia) Mark Eddy (Australia) Warren Luff	Audi R8 LMS GT3	A	292	**2nd**	**2nd**
2012	(Germany) Phoenix Racing	(Australia) Mark Eddy (Australia) Warren Luff	Audi R8 LMS GT3	A	156	DNF	DNF
2013	(Australia) Rod Salmon	(Australia) Warren Luff (Australia) Rod Salmon	Audi R8 LMS GT3	A	162	DNF	DNF
2014	(Australia) Maranello Motorsport	(Australia) John Bowe (Australia) Peter Edwards (Finland) Mika Salo	Ferrari 458 GT3	A	296	**1st**	**1st**
2017	(Australia) Maranello Motorsport	(Finland) Toni Vilander (Australia) Jamie Whincup	Ferrari 488 GT3	AP	290	**1st**	**1st**
2018	(Australia) YNA Autosport	(France) Côme Ledogar (New Zealand) Shane van Gisbergen	McLaren 650S GT3	APP	119	DNF	DNF
2019	(Australia) Triple Eight Race Engineering	(Australia) Jamie Whincup (New Zealand) Shane van Gisbergen	Mercedes-AMG GT3	APP	312	4th	4th
2020	(New Zealand) Earl Bamber Motorsport	(New Zealand) Earl Bamber (Belgium) Laurens Vanthoor	Porsche 911 GT3 R	Pro	312	9th	8th
2022	(Australia) Scott Taylor Motorsport	(Australia) Geoff Emery (Australia) Alex Davison (Australia) Scott Taylor	Porsche 911 GT3 R	C	276	9th	**1st**
2023	(Australia) Scott Taylor Motorsport	(Australia) Geoff Emery (Australia) Alex Davison (Australia) Scott Taylor	Mercedes-AMG GT3	PA	177	DNF	DNF
2024	(Australia) Scott Taylor Motorsport	(Australia) Thomas Randle (Australia) Cam Waters	Mercedes-AMG GT3 Evo	Pro	275	7th	7th

== Personal life ==
September 2025 Lowndes announced he and Lara had separated.

2021 Lowndes was publicly disgraced after confirming a three year online affair with a catfish woman he had never met.

Lowndes claimed he was ashamed, in a bad place and was getting help

In 2011, Lowndes confirmed his amicable separation from his previous marriage.

Lowndes has confirmed in social media posts and his website, that he has entered into a new relationship

== Bibliography ==
- West, Luke (20 August 2021). The Immortals of Australian Motor Racing: The Local Heroes (Part of the 7-volume comprehensive sports collection). Immortals of Australian Sport (7-book series). Gelding Street Press. ISBN 978-1-925946-98-7.

Sporting positions
Preceded by John Bowe	Winner of the Australian Touring Car Championship; 1996	Succeeded by Glenn Seton
Preceded by Larry Perkins; Russell Ingall	Winner of the Bathurst 1000; 1996 (with Greg Murphy)	Succeeded by Geoff Brabham; David Brabham
Preceded by Glenn Seton	Winner of the Australian Touring Car Championship; 1998 & 1999	Succeeded by Mark Skaife
Preceded by None	Winner of the Clipsal 500; 1999	Succeeded by Garth Tander
Preceded by Mark Skaife; Todd Kelly	Winner of the Bathurst 1000; 2006, 2007 & 2008 (with Jamie Whincup)	Succeeded by Garth Tander; Will Davison
Preceded by Garth Tander; Will Davison	Winner of the Bathurst 1000; 2010 (with Mark Skaife)	Succeeded by Garth Tander; Nick Percat
Preceded by None	Winner of the V8 Supercars Endurance Cup; 2013 (with Warren Luff)	Succeeded by Jamie Whincup; Paul Dumbrell
Preceded by Bernd Schneider; Thomas Jäger; Alexander Roloff	Winner of the Bathurst 12 Hour; 2014 (with Peter Edwards & John Bowe & Mika Salo)	Succeeded by Katsumasa Chiyo; Wolfgang Reip; Florian Strauss
Preceded by Chaz Mostert; Paul Morris	Winner of the Bathurst 1000; 2015 (with Steven Richards)	Succeeded by Will Davison; Jonathon Webb
Preceded by Álvaro Parente; Shane van Gisbergen; Jonathon Webb	Winner of the Bathurst 12 Hour; 2017 (with Toni Vilander & Jamie Whincup)	Succeeded by Robin Frijns; Stuart Leonard; Dries Vanthoor
Preceded by David Reynolds; Luke Youlden	Winner of the Bathurst 1000; 2018 (with Steven Richards)	Succeeded by Scott McLaughlin; Alexandre Prémat
Preceded by Chaz Mostert; Steve Owen	Winner of the Enduro Cup; 2018 & 2019 (with Steven Richards & Jamie Whincup)	Succeeded by Matt Payne; Garth Tander
Awards and achievements
Preceded by Marcos Ambrose	Barry Sheene Medal; 2005 and 2006	Succeeded by Jamie Whincup
Preceded by James Courtney	Barry Sheene Medal; 2011	Succeeded by Mark Winterbottom
Preceded by Mark Winterbottom	Barry Sheene Medal; 2013	Succeeded by Scott McLaughlin
Preceded by Jason Richards	Peter Brock Medal; 2013	Succeeded by Neal Bates
Preceded by Scott McLaughlin	Barry Sheene Medal; 2015	Succeeded by Scott McLaughlin
Records
Preceded by Mark Skaife; 42 wins (1987 – 2011)	Most ATCC round wins 49 (1996 – 2015), 43rd win at the 2012 Sydney Telstra 500	Succeeded by Jamie Whincup; 50 wins (2002 – present)
Preceded by Mark Skaife; 90 wins (1987 – 2011)	Most ATCC race wins 105 (1996 – 2015), 91st win at the 2013 Chill Perth 360	Succeeded by Jamie Whincup; 114 wins (2002 – present)
