= Honda TRX 700XX =

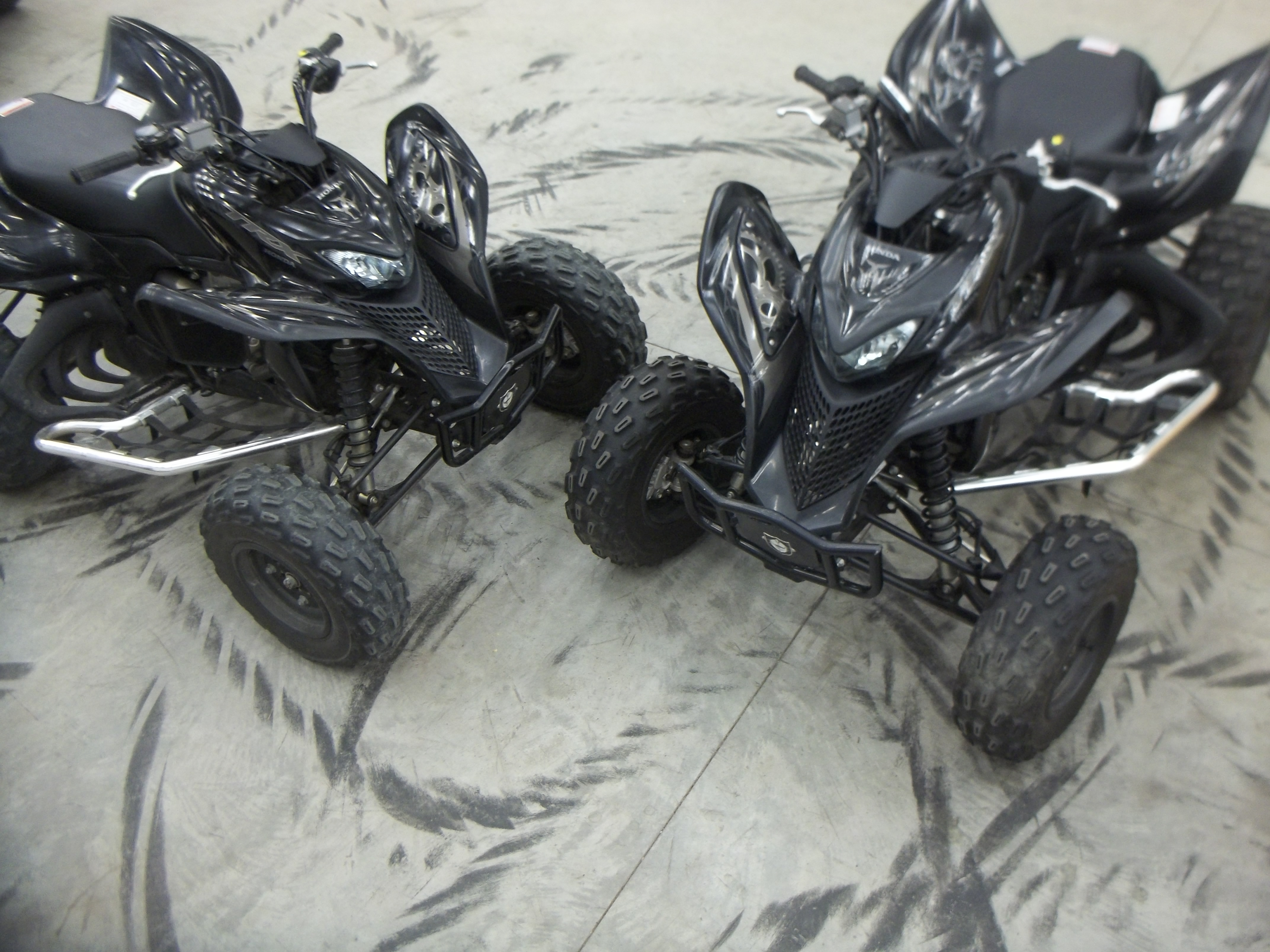

Overview
- Also called: "700XX'
- Production: 2008–2009

Body and chassis
- Related: Honda TRX450R; Honda TRX250R

Powertrain
- Engine: 686cc liquid-cooled four-stroke

The Honda TRX 700XX is an ATV (All Terrain Vehicle) or quad bike. The Honda 700XX is Honda's first generation of the 700XX and is powered by a 686 cc (41.9 cu in) single cylinder, 4 valve, electronically fuel injected engine (approximately 53 hp), with electric start and a 5-speed manual transmission with a 1-speed reverse. Top speed approximately 86 MPH. Manufactured from 2008–2009.
