= Ray Revell =

Australian speedcar driver

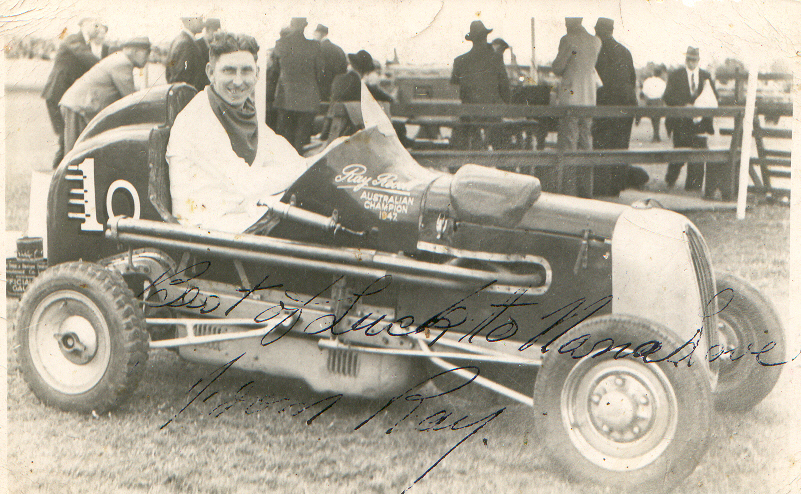
Ray Revell in the midget known as Q1 in 1948.

Raymond Stephen Henry Revell (9 March 1911 – 18 November 1968) is recognized as one of Australia's most respected speedcar (midget) drivers. He was an inaugural inductee into the Australian Speedway Hall of Fame in 2007, and the Australian Motor Sport Hall of Fame in 2016.

Between 1936 and 1964, Revell amassed over 116 career feature race victories, including 5 World Championships/ Derby events (1942, 1948, 1950, 1952, 1956) and 7 Australian Championships (1946, 1949, 1950, 1951, 1952, 1953, 1957).

Ray Revell raced in New South Wales, Queensland, Victoria, South Australia, Western Australia and the United States of America. Revell won his first race in America driving for film star Lana Turner

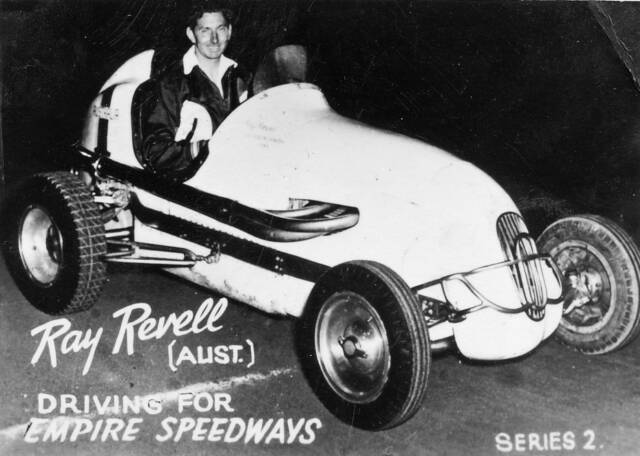
Promotional Photo of Ray Revell

Ray Revell modified his oval track speedcar to run on road courses, most notably Mt Panorama, Bathurst and Strath Pine Airstrip in Queensland. Revell's 'Rocket Car', with rockets attached to the rear of his A Model Speedcar Q18, was renowned for drawing crowds to speedway.

Revell was known for being the first Australian to race an Offenhauser in Australia. Revell purchased the car from millionaire businessman and philanthropist Howard Keck and shipped the car to Australia for the 1949–50 season.

In the post War years, Revell was often matched against international drivers in a series of short races. These races featured Americans Perry Grimm and Cal Niday, Englishman Bill Reynolds, New Zealander Reece Discombe and American/New Zealander Frank "Satan" Brewer.

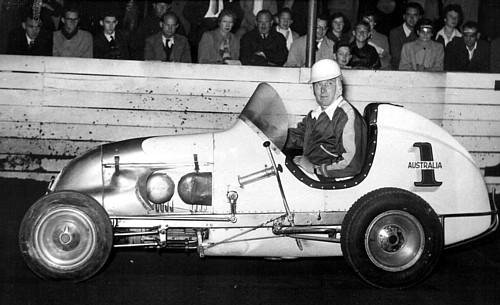
Ray Revell - Australia 1 Offy

Revell regularly captained the Australian Speedcar Team in races against the US and New Zealand. Revell also conducted "Match Races" in his midget against speedway motor bike star Andy Menzies.

Revell was best known for his Speedcar racing, but he also participated in promoting Stock Cars racing and was the winner of the first Stock Car race in Australia

Speedcar Historian Bill Lawler wrote that Revell was "the undisputed winningest driver at both the Sydney Showground (54 wins) and the Sydney Sports Ground (28 wins). Revell also mastered the tight ¼ mile Brisbane Exhibition Ground Speedway and is in 5th place in all-time winners there."

A street in the suburb of Gordon in the Australian Capital Territory bears his name.

== New South Wales & Queensland Speedcar/Midget Feature Race Victories ==
Date	State	Venue	Laps	Event	Car #	Engine
1941
Jul-20	Sydney NSW	Sports Ground	8		23	Fiat
Oct-04	Sydney NSW	Sports Ground	8		23	Fiat
Dec-06	Sydney NSW	Sports Ground	10		23	Fiat
1942						
April	Sydney NSW	Sports Ground	15	World Speedcar Championship	23	Plymouth
1946
Mar-15	Brisbane Qld	Exhibition Speedway	10		Q18	
Mar-22	Brisbane Qld	Exhibition Speedway	10		Q18	
Apr-05	Brisbane Qld	Exhibition Speedway	10	Queensland Speedcar Championship	Q18	
Sep-07	Brisbane Qld	Exhibition Speedway	10	Golden Helmet	Q1	
Sep-14	Brisbane Qld	Exhibition Speedway	12	Feature Race	Q1	
Sep-28	Brisbane Qld	Exhibition Speedway	10	Silver Sash Race	Q1	
Oct-05	Brisbane Qld	Exhibition Speedway	10	Golden Helmet (Rolling Start) & Scratch Race (Clutch Start)	Q1	
Oct-12	Brisbane Qld	Exhibition Speedway	10	Golden Helmet (Rolling Start) & Scratch Race (Clutch Start)	Q1	
Oct-19	Brisbane Qld	Exhibition Speedway	10		Q1	
Nov-01	Brisbane Qld	Exhibition Speedway	10	Golden Helmet Scratch Race	Q1	
Nov-09	Sydney NSW	Showground	9		Q1	
Nov-16	Sydney NSW	Showground	9		Q1	
Nov-30	Brisbane Qld	Exhibition Speedway	10	Golden Helmet Scratch Race	Q1	
Dec-07	Brisbane Qld	Exhibition Speedway	10	Feature Race	Q1	
Dev-21	Brisbane Qld	Exhibition Speedway	12	Feature Race	Q1	
Dec-28	Sydney NSW	Showground	9	Australian Speedcar Championship	Q1	
Dec-28	Sydney NSW	Showground	9	(2 races)	Q1	
1947
Jan-04	Sydney NSW	Showground	9		Q1	
Feb-01	Sydney NSW	Showground	9	New South Wales Speedcar Championship	Q1	
Feb-08	Brisbane Qld	Exhibition Speedway	8	Speedcar Feature Race	Q1	
Feb-22	Brisbane Qld	Exhibition Speedway	10		Q1	
May-05	Brisbane Qld	Exhibition Speedway	10	Speedcar Feature Scratch Race	Q1	
May-10	Brisbane Qld	Exhibition Speedway	10	2.5 Mile Feature Race	Q1	
Oct-18	Brisbane Qld	Exhibition Speedway	21	Feature Race	Q1	
Nov-01	Sydney NSW	Showground	9	New South Wales Speedcar Championship	Q1	
Nov-29	Sydney NSW	Showground	9		Q1	
1948
Jan-17	Sydney NSW	Showground	9	Feature Race	Q1	
Apr-10	Sydney NSW	Showground	20	World Speedcar Championship	Q1	Ford
Nov-27	Sydney NSW	Showground	9		Q1	
Dec-27	Sydney NSW	Showground	9		Q1	
1949
Jan-15	Sydney NSW	Showground	9		Q1	
Mar-05	Brisbane Qld	Exhibition Speedway	10	dead-heated with John Maxwell	Australia 1	offenhauser
Mar-18	Brisbane Qld	Exhibition Speedway	12	Queensland Speedcar Championship	Australia 1	offenhauser
Apr-02	Brisbane Qld	Exhibition Speedway	20	Australian Speedcar Championship	Australia 1	offenhauser
Oct-07	Sydney NSW	Sports Ground	12		Australia 1	offenhauser
Oct-08	Sydney NSW	Showground	9		Australia 1	offenhauser
Oct-14	Sydney NSW	Sports Ground	12		Australia 1	offenhauser
Oct-22	Sydney NSW	Showground	9	Feature Race	Australia 1	offenhauser
Oct-29	Sydney NSW	Showground	9		Australia 1	offenhauser
Nov-04	Sydney NSW	Sports Ground	9		Australia 1	offenhauser
Nov-05	Sydney NSW	Showground	15	New South Wales Speedcar Championship	Australia 1	offenhauser
Dec-03	Sydney NSW	Showground	9		Australia 1	offenhauser
Dec-16	Sydney NSW	Showground	12		Australia 1	offenhauser
1950
Jan-02	Windsor NSW	Windsor Speedway	9		7	offenhauser
Feb-11	Brisbane Qld	Exhibition Speedway	10	Feature Race	Australia 1	offenhauser
Feb-25	Sydney NSW	Showground	9	New South Wales Speedcar Championship	6	offenhauser
Apr-01	Brisbane Qld	Exhibition Speedway	30	World Speedcar Championship	Australia 1	offenhauser
Apr-15	Sydney NSW	Showground	15	Australian Speedcar Championship	7	offenhauser
Nov-17	Sydney NSW	Sports Ground	10		7	offenhauser
Nov-18	Sydney NSW	Showground	9		7	offenhauser
Nov-25	Sydney NSW	Showground	15	New South Wales Speedcar Championship	7	offenhauser
Dec-09	Sydney NSW	Showground	9		7	offenhauser
1951
Apr-07	Sydney NSW	Sports Ground	15	Sydney Cup	6	offenhauser
Apr-14	Sydney NSW	Sports Ground	15	Australian Speedcar Championship	6	offenhauser
1952
Feb-02	Sydney NSW	Showground	9		7	offenhauser
Mar-01	Brisbane Qld	Exhibition Speedway	10	Golden Helmet	Australia 1	offenhauser
Mar-08	Brisbane Qld	Exhibition Speedway	10	Feature Race	Australia 1	offenhauser
Apr-05	Brisbane Qld	Exhibition Speedway	10		Australia 1	offenhauser
Apr-19	Brisbane Qld	Exhibition Speedway	20	Australian Speedcar Championship	Australia 1	offenhauser
Apr-27	Brisbane Qld	Exhibition Speedway	30	World Speedcar Derby	Australia 1	offenhauser
May-03	Brisbane Qld	Exhibition Speedway	10	Golden Helmet	Australia 1	offenhauser
Oct-03	Sydney NSW	Sports Ground	8	Season Opener	Australia 1	offenhauser
Oct-10	Sydney NSW	Sports Ground	8		Australia 1	offenhauser
Oct-24	Sydney NSW	Sports Ground	12	Feature Race	Australia 1	offenhauser
Nov-07	Sydney NSW	Sports Ground	8		Australia 1	offenhauser
Nov-22	Sydney NSW	Showground	9	Feature Race	Australia 1	offenhauser
Nov-29	Sydney NSW	Showground	9		Australia 1	offenhauser
Dec-06	Sydney NSW	Showground	9	Feature Race	Australia 1	offenhauser
Dec-13	Sydney NSW	Showground	9		Australia 1	offenhauser
Dec-20	Sydney NSW	Showground	9	Feature Race	Australia 1	offenhauser
Dec-26	Sydney NSW	Sports Ground	10		Australia 1	offenhauser
1953
Jan-09	Sydney NSW	Sports Ground	9		Australia 1	offenhauser
Feb-07	Sydney NSW	Showground	9	Speedcar Feature Race	Australia 1	offenhauser
Feb-28	Sydney NSW	Showground	9	Speedcar Feature Race (Police Derby)	Australia 1	offenhauser
Mar-07	Sydney NSW	Showground	15	Australian Speedcar Championship	Australia 1	offenhauser
Mar-14	Sydney NSW	Showground	9		Australia 1	offenhauser
Mar-20	Sydney NSW	Sports Ground	12		Australia 1	offenhauser
Oct-09	Sydney NSW	Showground	10		Australia 1	offenhauser
Oct-23	Sydney NSW	Sports Ground	10	Speedcar Feature Race	Australia 1	offenhauser
Oct-30	Sydney NSW	Sports Ground	10		Australia 1	offenhauser
Nov-06	Sydney NSW	Sports Ground	10		Australia 1	offenhauser
Nov-14	Sydney NSW	Showground	9		Australia 1	offenhauser
Nov-28	Sydney NSW	Showground	9		Australia 1	offenhauser
Dec-19	Sydney NSW	Showground	9	Golden Helmet	Australia 1	offenhauser
Dec-26	Sydney NSW	Showground	9		Australia 1	offenhauser
1954
Jan-01	Sydney NSW	Sports Ground	10		Australia 1	offenhauser
Jan-30	Sydney NSW	Showground	9		Australia 1	offenhauser
Feb-06	Sydney NSW	Showground	9		Australia 1	offenhauser
Feb-19	Sydney NSW	Sports Ground	10		Australia 1	offenhauser
Feb-26	Sydney NSW	Sports Ground	10	Golden Helmet	Australia 1	offenhauser
Mar-06	Sydney NSW	Showground	9		Australia 1	offenhauser
Mar-19	Sydney NSW	Sports Ground	10		Australia 1	offenhauser
Apr-09	Sydney NSW	Sports Ground	18	Speedcar Handicap Race	Australia 1	offenhauser
Oct-29	Sydney NSW	Sports Ground	10	Speedcar Feature Race	Australia 1	offenhauser
Nov-05	Sydney NSW	Sports Ground	15		Australia 1	offenhauser
Dec-18	Sydney NSW	Showground	9		Australia 1	offenhauser
1955
Oct-08	Sydney NSW	Showground	9		65	Holden
Nov-26	Sydney NSW	Showground	9		65	Holden
1956
May-26	Brisbane Qld	Exhibition Speedway	30	World Speedcar Derby	Australia 1	offenhauser
Jun-16	Queensland	Rockhampton	6	Rocky Speedcar Title	Australia 1	offenhauser
Nov-10	Sydney NSW	Showground	15	Sydney Cup	Australia 1	offenhauser
Nov-17	Sydney NSW	Showground	10		Australia 1	offenhauser
Nov-24	Sydney NSW	Showground	12		Australia 1	offenhauser
1957
Jan-19	Sydney NSW	Showground	20	Australian Speedcar Championship	Australia 1	offenhauser
Feb-02	Sydney NSW	Showground	12		Australia 1	offenhauser
Feb-09	Sydney NSW	Showground	12		Australia 1	offenhauser
Feb-16	Sydney NSW	Showground	10		Australia 1	offenhauser
Mar-14	Queensland	Toowoomba Speedway	10	Darling Downs Championship	Australia 1	offenhauser
Mar-16	Sydney NSW	Showground	12		Australia 1	offenhauser
Mar-30	Brisbane Qld	Exhibition Speedway	10		Australia 1	offenhauser
May-04	Sydney NSW	Showground	12		Australia 1	offenhauser
Jun-15	Brisbane Qld	Exhibition Speedway	20		Australia 1	offenhauser
Jun-22	Brisbane Qld	Exhibition Speedway	30	Brisbane Cup	Australia 1	offenhauser
1958
No Wins
1959
No Wins
1960
Feb-06	Sydney NSW	Showground	15		Australia 1	offenhauser
1961
No Wins
1962
Dec-08	Sydney NSW	Showground	25		Australia 1	offenhauser

== Legacy ==
Ray's son Howard was a successful Speedcar driver who became known as the Marathon Man because of his success in 100 lap races.

Grandson Craig also competed in Speedcars without achieving any feature race wins, but has had victory as a car owner.

Grandson Glenn won the 1994 NSW Speedcar Championship (44 years after Ray won the same title for the 3rd time in 1950), .
