= Australian Motor Sport Hall of Fame =

Coordinates: 37°52′30″S 145°02′28″E

The Australian Motor Sport Hall of Fame was established by the Confederation of Australian Motor Sport "to give recognition to those who have brought greatness to motor sport in all its many disciplines, over the entire history of the sport in Australia." The Hall of Fame is strongly supported by Motorcycling Australia (MA), Karting Australia, the Australian National Drag Racing Association (ANDRA), Speedway Australia, the Australian Grand Prix Corporation and V8 Supercars. The Hall of Fame will cover motor racing, motorcycling, rallying, off-road, drag racing, karting and speedway.

The Hall of Fame Committee comprises respected members of all disciplines within the sport plus experienced journalists with a strong knowledge of motor sport's history and its participants. In March 2016, there were 30 inaugural inductees into the Fame. In 2017 another 20 inductees were added to the HoF. Twenty-one new members were inducted in 2018. Thirteen have been named for 2019, including a few high-profile sprint car and Supercars champions.

== Inductees ==
Year	Name	Discipline	Career highlights
2016	Troy Bayliss	Motorcycle racing	Three times World Superbike Champion.
2016	Colin Bond	Rallying	Three times Australian Rally Champion, Bathurst 500 Champion, Australian Touring Car Champion.
2016	Jack Brabham	Formula One	Three time Formula One World Champion.
2016	Peter Brock	Touring car racing	Won the Bathurst 1000 endurance race nine times, the Sandown 500 touring car race nine times and the Australian Touring Car Champion three times.
2016	Mark Burrows	Off-road racing	Seven times Australian Off-Road Champion and five Finke Desert Race wins.
2016	Kel Carruthers	Motorcycle racing	1969 250cc World Champion, Isle of Man 250TT Champion.
2016	James Courtney	Karting	Two times World Karting Champion, V8 Supercars Champion.
2016	Jason Crump	Motorcycle racing	3 times Speedway World Champion.
2016	Mick Doohan	Motorcycle racing	Five consecutive Premier Class F.I.M. World Championships from 1994 through to 1998 inclusive.
2016	Ross Dunkerton	Rallying	Five times Australian Rally Champion and Asia-Pacific Rally Champion.
2016	Harry Firth	Touring car racing	Bathurst 1000 winner and patriarch of the Holden Dealer Racing Team.
2016	Stephen Gall	Motorcycle racing	Five times Australian Motocross Champion, 4 times Mr. Motocross, Australian Speedcar Championship.
2016	Wayne Gardner	Motorcycle racing	1987 500cc World Champion.
2016	Gregg Hansford	Motorcycle racing	Ten times Grand Prix winner, Bathurst 1000 winner.
2016	Phil Irving	Formula One	Designer of Repco Formula 1 World Champion Engine.
2016	Bob Jane	Touring car racing	Bathurst 1000 and Australian Touring Car Champion, Australian NASCAR founder and motor racing circuit owner.
2016	Dick Johnson	Touring car racing	Five time Australian Touring Car Champion and three-time Bathurst 1000 winner.
2016	Alan Jones	Formula One	Formula One World Champion in 1980.
2016	Jeff Leisk	Motorcycle racing	World Junior Motocross Champion, Two times Australian Motocross Champion.
2016	Ash Marshall	Drag racing	Australian drag racing pioneer.
2016	Frank Matich	Open-wheel racing	Australian open-wheel and motorsport engineering icon.
2016	Allan Moffat	Touring car racing	Four time Australian Touring Car Champion and four time Bathurst 1000 winner.
2016	"Gelignite Jack" Murray	Rallying	REDeX Trial winner, London to Sydney Marathon pioneer.
2016	Ray Revell	Speedway	Five times Australian Speedcar Champion.
2016	Garry Rush	Speedway	Ten times Australian Sprintcar Champion.
2016	Norman ‘Wizard’ Smith	Land speed	Australian land speed record pioneer.
2016	Casey Stoner	Motorcycle racing	Two times MotoGP World Champion.
2016	Donald Kingsley Thompson	Motor sport administration	Co-founder and inaugural President, Confederation of Australian Motor Sport.
2016	Lionel van Praag	Motorcycle racing	1936 Speedway World Champion – the first motorsport World Champion.
2016	Jack Young	Motorcycle racing	Two time Speedway World Champion.
2017	Leigh Adams	Motorcycle racing	Ten times Australian Solo Champion, 1992 World Under-21 Solo Champion.
2017	Kevin Bartlett	Open-wheel racing	Two times Australian Drivers' Champion, Macau Grand Prix and Bathurst 1000 winner.
2017	Neal Bates	Rallying	Four times Australian Rally Champion.
2017	Possum Borne	Rallying	Multiple New Zealand, Australian and Asia-Pacific rally champion.
2017	Keith Campbell	Motorcycle racing	1957 FIM 350cc world champion - Australia's first motorcycling road racing world champion.
2017	Troy Corser	Motorcycle racing	Two times World Superbike Champion, one time Australian Superbike Champion and AMA Superbike Champion.
2017	Lex Davison	Open-wheel racing	Four time Australian Grand Prix winner.
2017	Frank Gardner	Touring car racing	Three time British Saloon Car Champion.
2017	John Large	Motor sport administration	Longest running President of the Confederation of Australian Motor Sport (1983-1994).
2017	Larry Perkins	Touring car racing	Six time Bathurst 1000 winner, Australian Formula Ford, Formula 2 and European Formula Three Champion.
2017	Tom Phillis	Motorcycle racing	1961 FIM 125cc world champion.
2017	John Pizarro	Karting	Fifteen time Australian Karting champion.
2017	Jim Read	Drag racing	Seventeen time National champion, sixteen time Australian champion - first Australian to break 7, 6 and 5 second ¼ mile.
2017	Jim Richards	Touring car racing	Four time Australian Touring Car Champion, seven time Bathurst 1000 and eight time Targa Tasmania winner, Australian AUSCAR and NASCAR champion, three time Australian Nations Cup Champion and two time Touring Car Masters champion.
2017	Ken Rumble	Motorcycle racing	Four time Australian scrambles champion.
2017	Vern Schuppan	Sports car racing	1983 24 Hours of Le Mans winner, 1983 All Japan Endurance Champion, two times Macau Grand Prix winner and 1976 Indianapolis 500 Rookie of the Year.
2017	Mark Skaife	Touring car racing	Five time Australian Touring Car Champion, three time Australian Drivers' Champion, six time Bathurst 1000 winner.
2017	Johnny Stewart	Speedway	Three time Australian Speedcar Champion.
2017	Ron Tauranac	Design and Engineering	Formula One car designer and engineer with Cooper and Brabham. Co-founder of Ralt cars.
2017	Coral Taylor	Rallying	Three times Australian Rally Champion as a navigator.
2017	Arthur George "Bluey" Wilkinson	Motorcycle racing	1938 Speedway World Champion.
2018	Frank Arthur	Motorcycle racing	1929 Star Riders' Champion
2018	John Bowe	Touring car racing	
2018	David Brabham		
2018	Geoff Brabham		
2018	Jeremy Burgess		
2018	Greg Carr	Rallying	
2018	Graeme Cowin	Drag racing	
2018	Mick Doohan	Motorcycle racing	
2018	Garry Flood	Motorcycle racing	
2018	John Harvey (racing driver)		
2018	Ken Kavanagh	Motorcycle racing	
2018	Frank Kilfoyle	Rallying	
2018	Aub Lawson	Motorcycle racing	
2018	Craig Martin	Off-road racing	
2018	Mat Mladin	Motorcycle racing	
2018	Drew Price	Kart racing	
2018	Mike Raymond		
	Billy Sanders	Motorcycle racing	
	Tim Schenken		
	George Tatnell	Speedway racing	
	Mark Webber	Formula One	
