= Privatbanen Sønderjylland =

Former Danish railway company

Privatbanen Sønderjylland ApS
- Company type: Anpartsselskab
- Industry: Rail transport
- Founded: 5 April 1997
- Defunct: 27 March 2001
- Fate: Bankruptcy
- Headquarters: Tønder, Denmark
- Website: www.eurorail.dk (Wayback Machine archive)

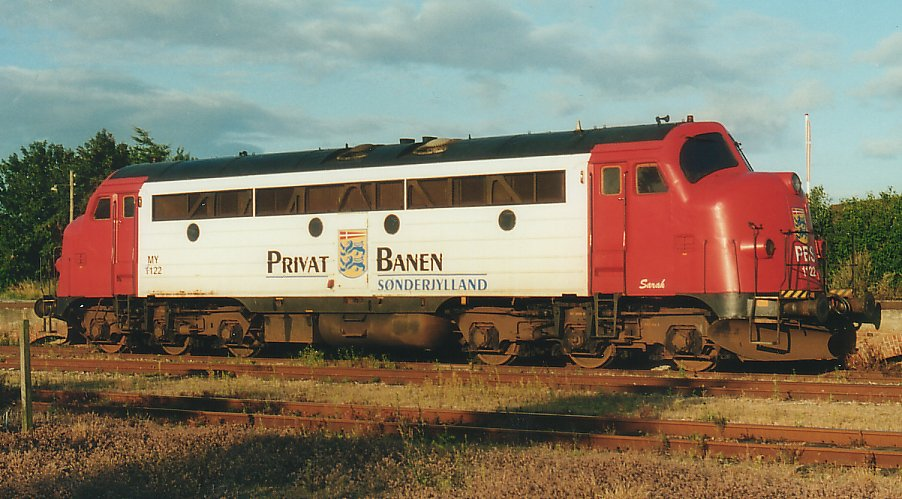
PBS class MY 1122, photographed in Tønder.

Privatbanen Sønderjylland ApS (abbreviated PBS, also known under the byname EuroRail) was a Danish railway operating company that existed between 1997 and 2001. Unlike other Danish railway companies at the time, PBS was an attempt to provide railway service on a purely commercial basis and entirely unsubsidised. Headquartered in Tønder in South Jutland, the company specialised in freight transport around most of Jutland.

Noted for its numerous battles with bureaucracy, the company was partially successful in getting otherwise closed freight lines up and running again. Motive power was obtained primarily through buying second-hand diesel locomotives from DSB, and a number of freight cars were leased from NS, the Dutch railways.

After several attempts to save the company, PBS was declared bankrupt in 2001. A new company, TraXion, was established and based on the remains of PBS, but was also commercially unsuccessful.
