= Norman Leslie Smith =

Australian racing driver

Norman Leslie Smith, also known by his pseudonym "Wizard", (13 July 1890 – 1 October 1958) was an Australian professional motor racing driver, known for his speed racing records. The Brisbane Times hailed him as "Australia's fastest motor driver".

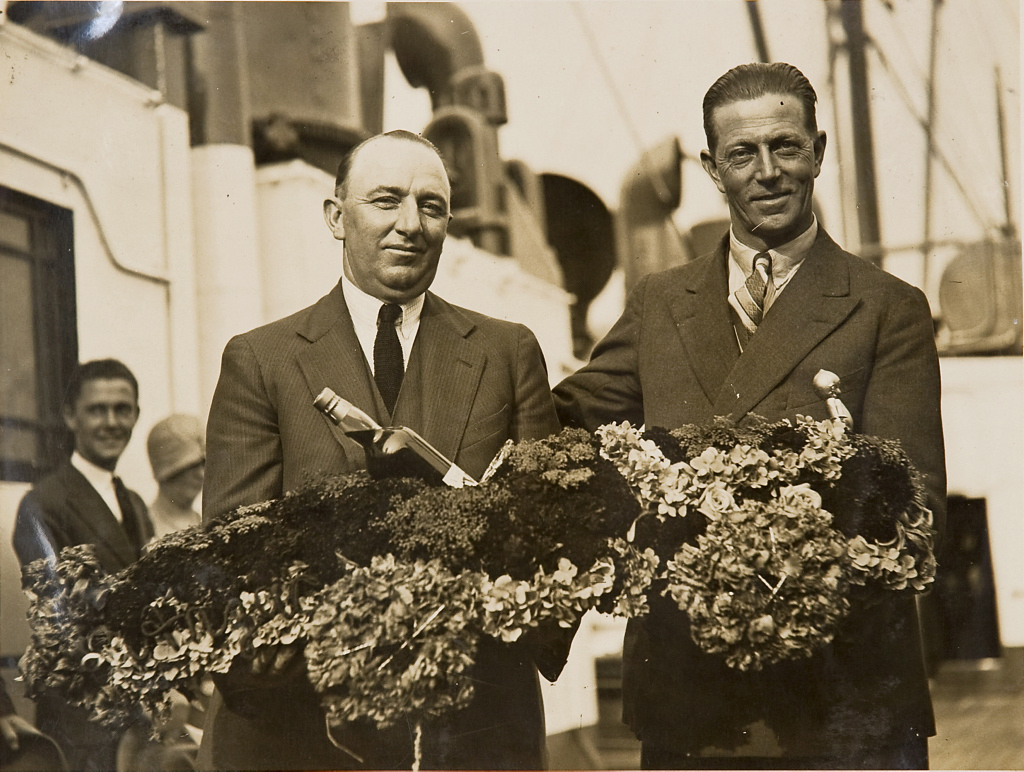

== Early life ==
Norman Leslie Smith was born on 13 July 1890 in Richmond, Sydney, Australia to Bill Smith and his spouse Cecilia, the youngest of nine children. Both his parents were farmers. Smith was a protege of motor vehicle importer Issac Phizackerley.

== Career ==
Never fear, I will break the world’s record no matter what the conditions are, and, if the gods are good, I will smash it to bits.

— Norman Smith

In World War I, Smith served as a driver at Melbourne, setting off on 22 December 1916, aboard the ship HMAT Persic, A34. After capturing his third major championship, the Alpine Rally in Victoria, Smith became known as "Wizard" Smith or "the Wizard". During his career as a competitive motor racer, Smith drove over 20,000 miles. Driving at incredible speeds never reached before, Smith held the national record for most distance speed records broken in Australia during his time. Among others, he broke a long distance driving record previously set by John "Iron Man" Burton. He was such a fast driver that he made an "express [train] look like a goods train" after driving significantly faster than it. Smith could reportedly drive on for days with little sleep.

In March 1930, Smith filed a request to be allowed to continue naming his race car Anzac. His request was denied on the grounds that it was a breach of the Australian law. In addition to driving, Smith also penned journal entries for newspapers like The Sun and The Sunday Times.

== Personal life ==
Smith wed Harriett Ann Russ on 15 April 1911. According to The Brisbane Times, Smith was "very softly spoken" and was also an "exceptionally careful driver". In October 1932, he filed a lawsuit against Smith's Weekly for libel. The case ended with Smith winning and being compensated £1000 in damages.
