= TraXion =

Danish railway company

TraXion A/S
- Company type: Aktieselskab
- Industry: Rail transport
- Founded: 2001
- Defunct: 1 November 2002
- Fate: Bankruptcy
- Headquarters: Padborg, Denmark
- Website: www.traxion.dk (Wayback Machine archive)

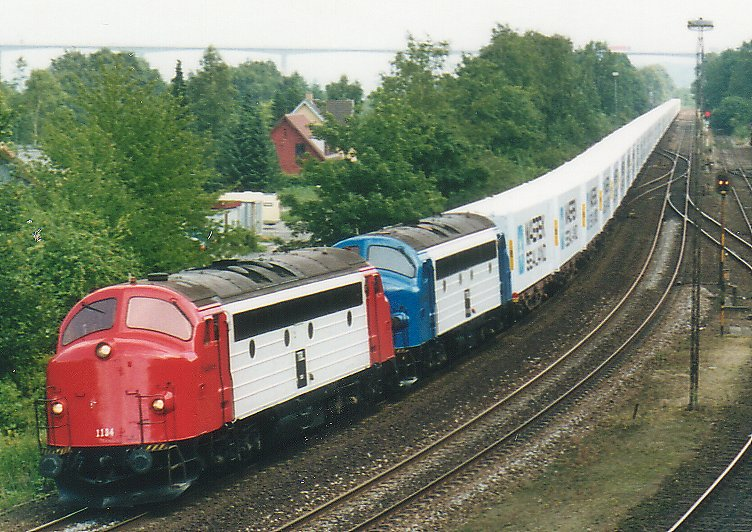
A TraXion container train near Vejle, 2001.

TraXion A/S (abbreviated TRX) was a Danish railway operating company that existed between 2001 and 2002. As an attempt to continue the activities of the bankrupt Privatbanen Sønderjylland (PBS/EuroRail), the company specialised in freight transport and operated on an independent commercial basis, as opposed to the approach of ownership of railway companies by the state or local authorities which is more prevalent in Denmark.

Based in Padborg, Southern Jutland, TraXion was formed in late March 2001 by former PBS manager Erik Panduro. Initially leasing motive power from the remains of PBS, the company later bought locomotives from DSB, the Danish national railway company. Their most prominent task was the transport of containers between Tinglev and Aarhus; other activities included hauling trains for track construction work.

As a result of the loss of the container transport task in 2002 and a sudden increase of insurance premiums, the company was declared bankrupt on 1 November 2002.
