= TRX1 =

TRX1 may refer to:

- TRX1, an identifier for MLL (gene)
- TRX1, an identifier for Thioredoxin
- TRX1, an immune-related disease treatment developed by Tolerx
