= Honda TRX450R =

All-terrain vehicle produced by Honda from 2004 to 2014

The TRX 450R is high performance All-terrain vehicle manufactured by Honda powersports. It was produced from 2004 to 2014.

== Engine ==
While the CRF450R and the TRX450R share the same displacement number, there are very few of the same components between the two engines. Initially, many people were disappointed because the first TRX450R was very weak compared to the CRF450R. Honda claims that it designed the TRX450R engine to produce more torque so that the engine was more suited for ATV purposes. In 2004 and 2005, the only interchangeable part between the ATV and motorcycle engines was the camshaft. In 2006, Honda overhauled the TRX450R engine to make it more similar to its motorcycle variant. This included a more aggressive cam profile, a larger bore with a shortened stroke, a new, short skirt piston and titanium rather than steel valves. In addition, Honda changed the carburetor from a 42 mm Keihin butterfly type to a 40 mm Keihin FCR. This increased the power from about 33 horsepower (25 kW) in the first generation to over 41 horsepower (31 kW) in the second. The first generation engine had a 10.5:1 compression ratio while the second generation had a 12:1 compression ratio.

== Racing ==
Because for many years the four-stroke class displacement limit was 440 cubic centimeters, many racing sanctions bumped this number up to allow the new 450 cc bikes and ATVs to compete.

Along with the introduction of the TRX 450R, Honda announced, after 17 years, it would once again support factory sponsored racing. The 450R would be the first factory sponsored bike out of any of the other ATV manufacturers. Honda's first sponsored rider on the new 450r would be Tim Farr. The sponsored Honda team would compete in the ATVA MX and TT Nationals in the Pro-Production class. The 450r's first national race would be the 2003 Baja 1000.

The 450R was off to a good start even before its public launch. The 450R was first across the line in the ATV class with a total time of 22 hours, 27 minutes, and 24 seconds. With an average speed of 37 mph (60 km/h). In the 2004 National MX races, the 450R would place 3rd overall.

Desert racing, and track racing would not be the only events the 450R would race in. The 450R would also compete in the Grand National Cross Country series although Honda would not sponsor any riders.

== Specifications ==
All specifications are manufacturer-claimed.

	2004/2005 TRX450r	2006/2007/2008 TRX450r	2006/2007/2008 TRX450ER
Engine type	4-Stroke, Liquid-Cooled, SOHC, 4 Valve Cylinder Head, Single-Cylinder		
Displacement	449.70 cc	449.49 cc	
Bore/stroke	94.0 mm x 64.8 mm	96.0 mm x 62.1 mm	
Compression ratio	10.5:1	12:1	
Fuel Carburetion	Keihin 42 mm round-slide w/TPS	Keihin 40 mm flat-slide with trottle position sensor (TPS)	
Transmission	5-speed		
Final drive	O-ring-sealed chain		
Front Tire Size	22 x 7-10 knobby radial		
Rear Tire Size	20 x 10-9 knobby radial		
Length	72.6 in	73.3 in	
Width	46.3 in		
Height	43.6 in	43.3 in	
Seat height	32.8 in	32.6 in	
Front suspension	Independent double-wishbone with Showa shocks, featuring adjustable spring preload, rebound and compression damping		
Front wheel travel	8.4 in		
Rear suspension	Pro-Link with single Showa shock featuring adjustable spring preload, rebound and compression damping		
Rear Wheel Travel	9 in	9.3 in	
Front Brake Type	Dual hydraulic 17 mm discs with twin-piston calipers		
Rear Brake Type	Single hydraulic 19 mm disc with single-piston caliper		
Fuel Tank Capacity	04-07= 3.15 gal/ 08-13= 2.6 gal		
Seat Height	32.5 in	32.3 in	
Dry Weight	162/168 kg R/ER		
Colors	2004: Red 2005: Red or Black	2006: Red or Black	2007: 450R: Red, TRX450ER Red, White, Black/Flame. 2008: Red, White, Black/Blue
Warranty	6 months		
Top Speed	74 mph (everything stock)		

== Model History ==
=== 2005 ===
- Untouched from the 2004 version
- Black plastics color scheme option added

=== 2006 ===
- Electric start models added along with kick start models.
- Engine compression raised from 10.5:1 to 12:1
- Engine bore increased to 96 mm and stroke lowered to 62 mm
- Maximum engine rpm is raised from 9800 to 9850
- New transmission ratios designed for racing applications and trail use
- Swing arm extended to help alleviate the "bucking" of the previous models. The "bucking" should be able to be tuned out with the correct (for the riders weight) spring. And by tuning the compression / rebound.
- Rider position is lowered by 8 mm
- Rear suspension travel is extended from 9 inches (230 mm) to 9.3 inches (240 mm)
- Head light changed to a more "race-derived look".
- Front knuckles changed making the front end "push". Extending the swing arm will affect the front end. = "push"
- Angle of engine changed.

=== 2007 ===
- New White and Black/Flame colors on the electric start version

=== 2008-2014 ===
- New Black/Blue color joins White on the electric start version
- Style of and reposition of the auto decompression feature to other side of cam carrier
- Black Wheels became an option with the Orange Frame/White plastics
- Gas tank capacity decreased to 2.6 Gallons and addition of body plastic over tank.

2014 was the last year of production for the TRX 450R
