= Landy Scott =

American racing driver

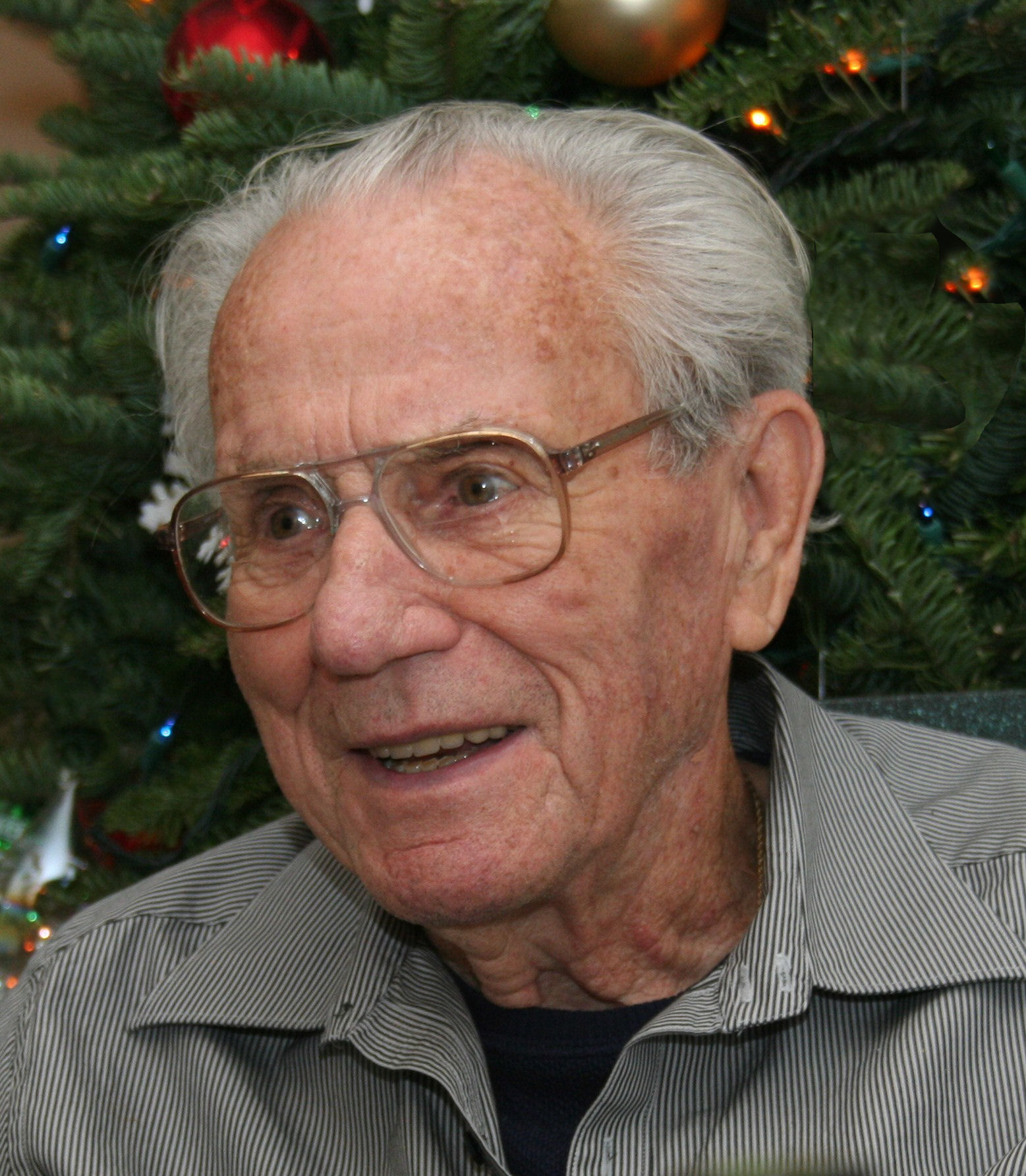
Landy Scott, Christmas 2006

Landis George Scott (June 21, 1919 – November 3, 2014) was an American midget car racing champion. He also served as the President of Badger Midget Auto Racing Association from 1951 to 1959. On July 28, 2024, Landy was inducted into the Badger Midget Auto Racing's Hall of Fame.

== Life ==
Scott was born in the small town of Oconto, Wisconsin, in the northwoods of Wisconsin. His father, George, was a lumberjack. His family moved to Milwaukee in southern Wisconsin at the age of five. Landy's dream of becoming a race driver began as a member of Wally Zale's pit crew. The Japanese had other plans and on December 7, 1941, they attacked of Pearl Harbor. Days later, Landy was a soldier in the United States Army Air Forces. After World War II, Landy took his military mustering out pay and bought his first Midget race car. Landy, a virtual unknown competed against the nation's greatest racing stars of the 1940s and 1950s. Landy drove his #17 midget racer, powered by an unconventional Studebaker engine, on a shoestring budget to victories on oval dirt tracks everywhere.

Over a two-year span (1947–1948) Landy won an incredible twenty feature races, with fourteen second-place finishes and twelve thirds. Landy also won 33 heat races and semi-features. All totaled, Landy had 151 top 3 finishes over that two-year period. In 1947 Landy won an incredible six (6) consecutive Feature races, a Badger Midget Racing record that still stands today (August 2020).

Landy's career highlight was winning the Badger Midget Auto Racing Association's (BMARA) 1947 Championship and eventually becoming the president of BMARA.

Landy's #17 Studebaker powered Kurtis Kraft Midget Race Car, restored by Dave Rumsey (Holland, MI), is now back in the Scott Family where it has won the following awards on the car show circuit:

1st Place, Race Car Division - 2009 Corona Del Mar Coastline Car Classic

3rd Place, Race Car Division - 2010 Del Mar Concours d'Elegance

1st Place, Race Car Division - 2011 Desert Classic Concours d'Elegance (La Quinta, CA)

1st Place, Race Car Division - 2011 Santa Barbara Concours d'Elegance

Greatest Racing Heritage Award - 2011 Santa Barbara Concours d'Elegance

3rd Place, People's Choice Award - 2014 Winter Meet, Los Angeles Chapter, Studebaker Drivers Club

1st Place, Special Interest - 40th Annual (2014) La Palma Studebaker Car Show, Studebaker Drivers Club

Featured car - 2010 Grand National Roadster Show's "The History of the Race Car", Los Angeles, CA

As of June 21, 2023, Landy's famous #17 Midget is on display at the Wisconsin Automotive Museum in Hartford, Wisconsin.

== President of BMARA ==
Between 1951 and 1959, while still racing, Landy served as the President of Badger Midget Auto Racing Association (BMARA). During that time Landy initiated many changes. Here are a few of the changes implemented by Landy during his tenure as the President of Badger.

- Obtained insurance for the drivers paying $1,000 for medical bills or $1,000 life insurance. Prior to that, collections were taken and or BMARA money was used to help those injured or who died.
- Implemented awarding trophies for the Point Standing Champion, later adding additional trophies for the top five positions and beyond. (In previous years champions were not awarded trophies).
- Divided the nightly purse to pay all drivers instead of only the top six, helping teams on a small budget race more often.
- Formed the "Tri-State Agreement" between Illinois, Iowa and Wisconsin to increase the number of cars at each race. Prior to this agreement high fees, charged by various organizations, made it cost prohibitive for drivers to race in other states, so most remained in their home state. Car count increased dramatically after the agreement.
- Implemented a dress code to promote a more uniform and professional appearance of the drivers, crew, and staff.
- Increased the number of local tracks to reduce travel time and cost, with a five track weekly circuit (Sun Prairie, Slinger, Cedarburg, Hales Corners and Milwaukee). Prior to the five track weekly schedule, drivers had to drive thousands of miles a week if they wanted to compete as a full-time race driver.
- Implement a new rule which prohibited a driver from driving in a race within 72 hours of flipping a race car, without a doctor's waiver. Landy was one of the first drivers affected by his own rule when he tried to drive after flipping at Soldier Field without a waiver from a doctor (he didn't drive).

== Death ==
Landy died November 3, 2014, of natural causes at the age of 95.
