= Michael Pickens =

NZ race car driver

Michael Pickens (born 7 January 1983) is a speedway driver from Auckland, New Zealand. He races midgets and sprint cars in New Zealand, Australia and the United States.

Pickens is a ten-time New Zealand Midget Car champion and was the 2021 New Zealand Sprintcar champion. Pickens is often referred to as the Greatest in New Zealand History. He also won the 2015/2016 Australian Speedcar Championship.

Pickens has won races and championships in New Zealand, Australia, and United States in Quarter Midgets, 3/4 Midgets, Midgets, Sprint Cars and Karts.

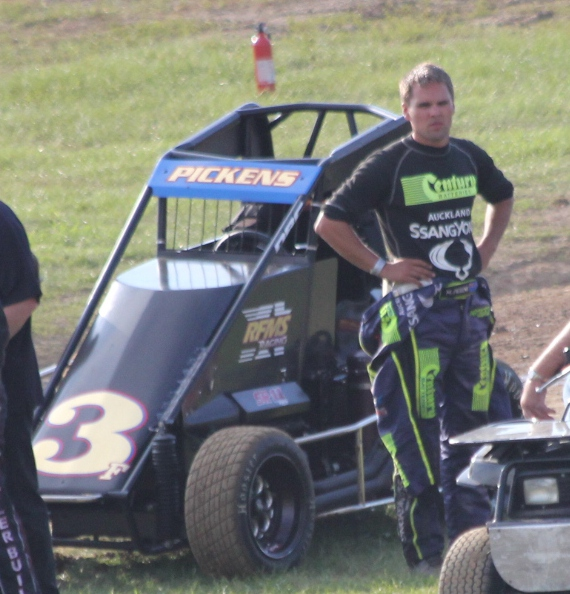
Pickens beside his USAC Midget car (United States) in July 2014

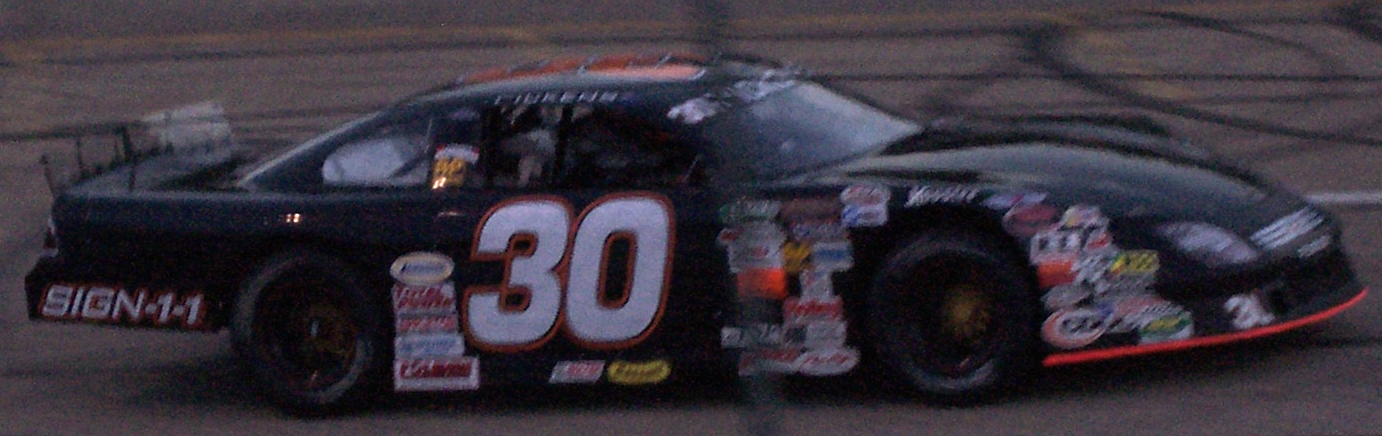
Pickens racing his 2008 ASA Late Model Series car

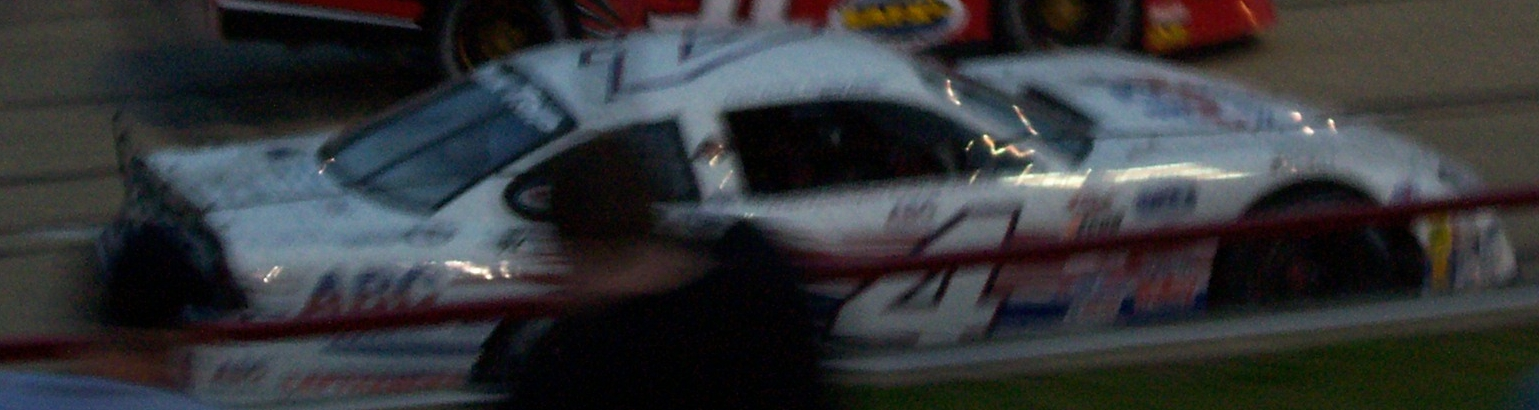
Pickens racing in his late model at Madison International Speedway in 2007

== Racing career ==
In 2005, Pickens competed at the Chili Bowl midget car race at Tulsa, Oklahoma. He won Rookie of the Year honors with an outstanding drive from 19th starting position to a race ending sixth-place finish. He was noticed by some key people at NASCAR NEXTEL Cup's Roush Racing. While not having prior experience on pavement, as there are no pavement ovals in New Zealand, Pickens did compete in the Roush's Driver Development Competition Program in 2005. He made it to the final round of competition and was the last driver be cut.

In 2005, Pickens won the 55th running of the Australian Speedcar Grand Prix held at the Avalon Raceway in Victoria. That year, he also finished second in the Australian Speedcar Championship at the Perth Motorplex. He would later finish third in the 2011 Australian Championship in Lismore, New South Wales. In 2016, he won the Australian Speedcar title at Parramatta Raceway.

Perkins' regular rides in New Zealand are his own #54A CRC King Chassis Midget, and his #54A CRC Sprintcar. His regular Australian drive is with Brett Morris, competing in the Australian Speedcar Championship and the World Midget Series. He also drives in the USA, competing at Midget Week, the Turkey Night Grand Prix and Chili Bowl Nationals.

In the middle of the 2007 U.S. season, Pickens raced for Ken Hendricks' American Speed Association Late Model Team, Urban Force Racing, mainly at Madison International Speedway. He left the team in July (being replaced by Dan Lensing) near the middle of the season, and began running a mixture of midget and pavement car races for various owners.

In the 2008 U.S. racing season, Pickens raced a midget car weekly at Angell Park Speedway and the No. 30 car in ASA Late Model Series events.

== Career highlights ==
2016 Australian Speedcar Champion (and first ever New Zealander to win this title)

2015/16 International Midget Series Overall Winner (and winner of World 30 Lap Derby and 50 Lap Classic)

10 time New Zealand Midget Champion

1 time New Zealand Sprint Car Champion

Multiple winged sprint car feature wins

Multiple track and lap records

Multiple National Series Championship wins

200 A-Main wins in New Zealand including 9 consecutive A-main wins in a row

6 times New Zealand midget Grand Prix win

2 times North Island champion

5 times Barry Butterworth 40 lap winner

Multiple International Series wins over 30, 40 and 50 laps

Multiple Herman Tros shield wins

Multiple USAC/POWRi/Badger feature wins

6 times Chili Bowl A-main qualifier

3rd 2011 Chili Bowl A-main

UMRA TQ feature winner (on debut)

2 times Australian Super Series speedcar Championship winner (midgets)

Australian Grand Prix winner (midgets)

ASA Pavement Late Model Series feature and pole winner

NASCAR Craftsman Truck Driver X finalist

(Most likely outdated information)
