= Liverpool Speedway =

Speedway in New South Wales, Australia

Liverpool Speedway Liverpool International Speedway Liverpool City Raceway
The Place of Pace
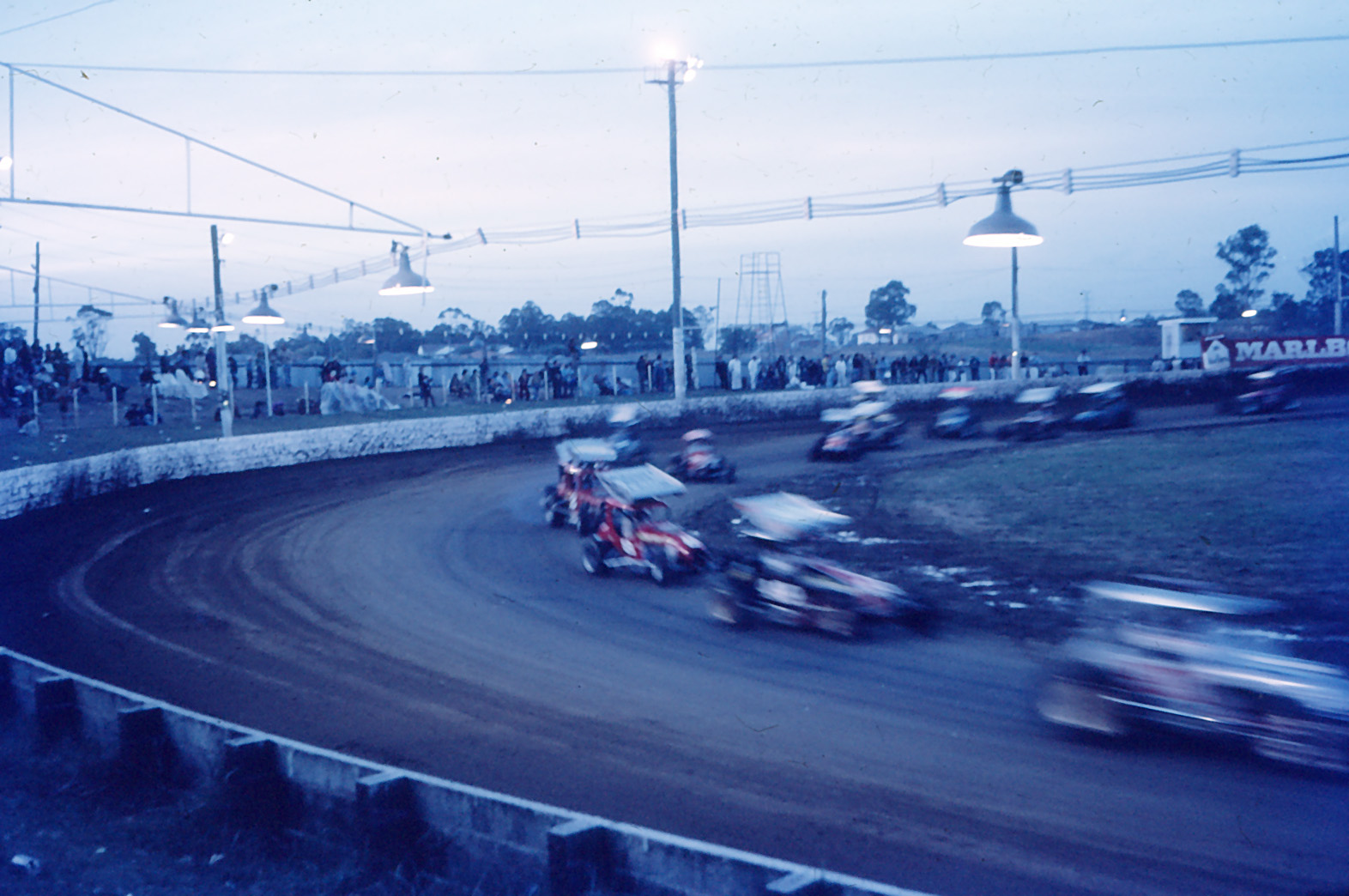
- Liverpool Speedway in 1973
- Location: Cnr of South Liverpool and Wilson Roads, Green Valley, New South Wales
- Coordinates: 33°54′25″S 150°52′2″E
- Capacity: 25,000
- Operator: Mike Raymond and Frank Oliveri
- Opened: 1967
- Closed: 1989
- Former names: Liverpool Speedway (1967-1974); Liverpool International Speedway (1974-1980); Liverpool City Raceway (1980-1989)
- Major events: Australian Speedcar Championship; Australian Solo Championship; Australian Speedway Sidecar Championship; Australian Solo Masters; 1974 & 1989 Best 100Lap Marlboro Grand Nationals br> 1982 Speedway World Pairs Championship; Australian Speedcar Grand Prix; Australasian Solo Final

Speedway
- Surface: Dolomite and clay mix (1967-1974); Asphalt (1974-1984); Clay (1984-1989)
- Length: 0.280 mi (0.450 km)

Motorcycle Oval
- Surface: Dolomite, Crushed Granite
- Length: 0.193 mi (0.310 km)

Liverpool Speedway (also known during its life as Liverpool International Speedway and Liverpool City Raceway) was located in Green Valley, Western Sydney, New South Wales, Australia. Liverpool was officially opened by Frank Oliveri and the Oliveri Family, alongside Ald. E. Smith, the mayor of Liverpool at the time, and ran until its sudden and unexpected closure in 1989. Frank Oliveri would later share track management with track announcer and promoter, Channel 7 television sports presenter Mike Raymond.

The builder of the race circuit is named Douglas Charles Barrett.

== History ==
Liverpool Speedway was officially opened by the Oliveri Family on 14 May 1967. The 450-metre (490 yd) track was D-shaped and was a clay-and-dolomite mix. On the program that first day were Speedcars, TQ's, super modifieds, stock cars and production sedans.

Liverpool was managed and promoted by Channel 7 television sports presenter Mike Raymond and former Liverpool Mayor Frank Oliveri. The speedway was promoted heavily on television and radio. With television personality Raymond in charge, Liverpool was perhaps the best-promoted speedway in Australia during the mid-1970s and through the 1980s.

During the winter of 1974, the management of the speedway announced that the track surface was being changed from clay and dolomite to asphalt. At this time the venue had its first name change when it became known as the "Liverpool International Speedway". Also announced at the time were extensive renovations including a fully enclosed grandstand with a glass-enclosed restaurant, a VIP lounge and a 3-storey control tower, all aimed at increasing the track's spectator capacity to around 35,000. The track was paved in time for the 1974/75 season, but the other proposed works never got off the ground.

Liverpool Speedway's biggest annual event was the Marlboro Grand National 100 Lap race which was first run in 1971 and won by local driver Rick Hunter. The race became the home of specialist pavement racing cars which eventually became known as Grand National's. This event attracted drivers from all around Australia and the United States making it the most prestigious sedan based speedway event ever hosted in Australia at the time other than the annual National Championships and crowds of up to 25,000 people would attend this event.

Grand National Sedans were a new breed of cars developed especially for Liverpool Raceway, though some were easily adapted for the many dirt track speedways around Australia. They were a tube spaceframe chassis with a fuel injected small block V8 engine, similar to a Sprintcar engine and although designed primarily for racing on Liverpool's paved oval the cars competed on dirt or clay around the country including at the Newcastle Motordrome north of Sydney, Parramatta City Raceway in western Sydney, Rowley Park and later Speedway Park in Adelaide, Claremont Speedway in Perth, Premier Speedway in Warrnambool, and Archerfield Speedway in Brisbane.

One of the speedway management's biggest promotions was to annually bring a team of four sedan drivers from America to race at Liverpool in test Matches against the Australian drivers. American drivers such as Gene Welch, "Big Ed" Wilbur and Rodney Combs became regulars in Australia and the action on the track was often described as "World Championship Wrestling on Wheels". The test matches took place both on the dirt track and the pavement with the usually good natured crowd totally against the visiting Americans.

Despite the change in track surface from dirt to asphalt, Speedcars, Sprintcars and other car categories continued to race at the speedway with the track hosting the Australian Speedcar Championship in 1976 and a round of the three race 1977 Australian championship.

In 1975, Mike Raymond and his promotions partner Frank Oliveri attracted then three time Indy 500 champion A. J. Foyt and fellow Indy racer Mel Kenyon to Liverpool to race in VW powered Speedcars in the 21st Australian Speedcar Grand Prix. Foyt passed Kenyon for the lead in mid-race after Kenyon almost spun on oil and tapped the fence. Kenyon still finished 2nd while the USA made it a 1-4 result with Larry Rice and Garry Patterson being the only other drivers to finish on the lead lap. The attendance for the Grand Prix was around 10,000.

Foyt returned to Liverpool for the 22nd Australian Grand Prix in 1976 along with fellow Indy 500 winner Johnny Rutherford and fellow Americans Ron "Sleepy" Tripp and Hank Butcher. All four Americans, along with most of the field, drove the VW powered cars. A.J. Foyt was again the winner this time passing local hero and National Champion George Tatnell in the dying laps. Tatnell was driving his controversial Winfield sponsored "Wedge" Speedcar powered by an off-set Offenhauser engine. Despite Tatnell's over 10 years of racing speedway until that point, his relative inexperience at running on paved ovals compared to Foyt showed when his tyres went off while Foyt was able to keep his tyres fresh enough to push harder in the final laps.

Liverpool, which was renamed in 1980 to become the "Liverpool City Raceway", continued to run the Australian Speedcar Grand Prix on both the asphalt and dirt until 1988 with such winners as 10 time Australian Sprintcar Champion Garry Rush in 1977, Ron "Sleepy" Tripp of the United States in 1983 and 1984, and after the track had reverted to a clay surface, World of Outlaws legend Steve Kinser would swap his Sprintcar for a Speedcar and win in 1986.

Stock Saloons were also a favourite at the track. The cars had to be a pre-1968 production car and they raced the track in a Clockwise direction. In Speedway, either on dirt or bitumen, almost every class of car and the Solo bikes race oval tracks Anti-clockwise. Squealing tyres would become the norm at Liverpool in its 10-year run as a paved speedway.

When it was decided to pave the Speedway in 1974 it was also decided to build a 310 metres (340 yards), dolomite and dirt based motorcycle track on the inside of the pavement track so as to keep both cars and bikes on the same race program. As the new track had no outside safety fence, speedway management had to get special dispensation from the NSW Government to build the track as the NSW Speedway Act stated that no speedway could run without a safety fence. The new track a distinct camber and had two straights due to the back straight being not following the "D" curve of the main track (this also saw the spectators on the back straight about 30 metres back from the track). Previous to this, Solos and sidecars had been run at Liverpool on the main track since the tracks opening after local rider Gordon Guasco convinced Speedway Manager Oliveri to put bikes on the program. Guasco was to lose his life at the track in a crash on 8 November 1970.

The infield motorcycle track hosted many world class solo and sidecar riders during its life, with solo riders like local stars Billy Sanders, John Langfield, Phil Herne, Garry Middleton and Gary Guglielmi mixing it with interstate stars such as Phil Crump, John Boulger and John Titman. Also, World Champions such as Ivan Mauger (New Zealand), Ole Olsen and Hans Nielsen (Denmark) and Americans Bruce Penhall, Bobby Schwartz, Dennis Sigalos and Shawn Moran regularly raced at Liverpool when competing in Australia.

In 1976, Ole Olsen, the reigning World Champion, won the only Australian Solo Championship held at Liverpool, to date the last time a non-Australian won the national title. This was despite protests from other riders who did not believe the Dane should have been eligible to ride in an Australian Championship meeting.

In a major win for the Liverpool City Raceway management and promoters, the track was awarded the 1982 Speedway World Pairs Championship Final. It would prove to be the only time in the 26 years of the World Pairs Championship (1968-1993) that it was ever been held outside of England or Europe. The championship was won by Dennis Sigalos and Bobby Schwartz representing the United States. The pair finished unbeaten over their six heats with Sigalos winning each and Schwartz 2nd each time giving them a 5–1 advantage in each race. They finished on a perfect 30 points (Sigalos 18, Schwartz 12) ahead of Englands Peter Collins and Kenny Carter on 22 (Collins 15, Carter 7) and Denmark's Hans Nielsen and Ole Olsen in third on 21 points (Nielsen 11, Olsen 10). Host nation Australia, represented by local Liverpool riders Billy Sanders (the reigning Australian Champion) and Gary Guglielmi, finished in fourth place on 16 points (Sanders 11, Guglielmi 5). 1982 would prove to be the only time in World Pairs Final history that a pair have won with the maximum possible score.

Following the 1983/84 speedway season the pavement was torn up and the dirt was re-introduced with clay as the main surface, though the bikes continued on their own track as the main tracks clay surface was not suitable for bikes. The Grand Nationals were still popular, but Sprintcars were fast becoming Australia's most popular speedway division. Also popular at Liverpool and through NSW and Queensland was a class known as Compact Speedcars.

=== METRO WEST BMX ===
Liverpool also had a BMX track at the south western end of the venue and hosted many international events. The BMX track was known as "Metro West" BMX track. The track originally had the starting hill in the center of the track. All of the riders would line up just outside the track and win between races, three races full of riders at a time would cross two racing lanes of the track to behind the starting hill. They would then select a golf ball out of a bucket with 1 of 6 numbers written on it, which gave them their starting lane position. Around 1984, the starting hill was moved to the south west corner of the track. The track had fences with advertising signs and was very professionally operated. In the early 1980’s, a tour was organized for group of American riders who toured the country and raced at the venue. Stu Thompson, Greg Hill and Perry Kramer raced at Metro West at various times. One event at Metro West had a $10,000 pro purse which was the highest purse in Australian BMX history at the time.

=== The end ===
By 1989 the speedway was under threat by the so-called urban sprawl, and this led to the reluctant closure of the venue to make way for new housing and a shopping complex now known as the Valley Plaza and for Winnall Reserve, Rugby League Fields, the home of Hinchinbrook Hornets. With the Sydney Showground Speedway at Moore Park not hosting weekly meetings after the 1979/80 season, and Liverpool closing in 1989, this left the more Sprintcar focused Parramatta City Raceway at Granville (opened in 1977) as Sydney's only active major speedway. The bikes continued racing at the poorly attended Nepean Speedway in north western outskirts of Sydney, but otherwise many Sydney based riders such as Craig Boyce, Mick Poole and Stephen Davies were forced to use the popular Newcastle Motordrome as their home track. The Motordrome, which itself closed in 2002, was located approximately 175 km (108 mi) north of Sydney in Newcastle. Currently most Sydney and NSW riders use the motorcycle only Loxford Park Speedway in Kurri Kurri as their home track.

== Classes of Racing ==
The racing classes that were run at the Liverpool Speedway are: Sprintcars, Speedcars, Grand National Sedans, Stock Saloons / Super Sedans, Solos, Sidecars, BMX, Compact Speedcars, GP Midgets, Figure 8 racing, Demolition Derby, Stunt Shows.

== Speedway World Finals ==
=== World Pairs Championship ===
- 1982 - United States (Bobby Schwartz / Dennis Sigalos) - 30pts

== Famous Competitors ==
- Jim Airey ( (Australia) ) (solo)
- Grenville Anderson ( (Australia) ) (sedan) †
- Paul Ash ( (Australia) ) (grand national sedan) †
- John Boulger ( (Australia) ) (solo)
- Steve Brazier ( (Australia) ) (sprintcar/super modified)
- Dick Britton ( (Australia) ) (sprintcar/super modified)
- Brian Callaghan ( (Australia) ) (sedan/speedcar)
- Kenny Carter ( (England) ) (solo) †
- Peter Collins ( (England) ) (solo)
- Rodney Combs ( (United States) ) (sedan)
- Gene Cook ( (Australia) ) (grand national sedan)
- Peter Crick ( (Australia) ) (grand national sedan)
- Phil Crump ( (Australia) ) (solo)
- Max Dumesny ( (Australia) ) (sprintcar)
- Johnny Fenton ( (Australia) ) (speedcar)
- A. J. Foyt ( (United States) ) (speedcar)
- Ove Fundin ( (Sweden) ) (Solo)
- Ray Godsey ( (United States) ) (grand national sedan)
- Barry Graham ( (Australia) ) (sedan/speedcar)
- Gordon Guasco ( (Australia) ) (Solo) †
- John Harvey ( (Australia) ) (speedcar)
- Jack Hewitt ( (United States) ) (grand national sedan)
- Sid Hopping (super modified)
- Mel Kenyon ( (United States) ) (speedcar)
- Mark Kinser ( (United States) ) (sprintcar)
- Kelly Kinser ( (United States) ) (sprintcar)
- Randy Kinser ( (United States) ) (sprintcar)
- Steve Kinser ( (United States) ) (sprintcar/speedcar)
- Ronald Mackay (speedcar)
- Ivan Mauger ( (New Zealand) ) (solo)
- Sid Middlemass ( (Australia) ) (speedcar)
- Rick Miller ( (United States) ) (solo
- Larry Moore ( (United States) ) (sedan)
- Shawn Moran ( (United States) ) (solo)
- Hans Nielsen ( (Denmark) ) (solo)
- Ole Olsen ( (Denmark) ) (solo)
- Gary Patterson ( (United States) ) (sprintcar/super modified/speedcar) †
- Bruce Penhall ( (United States) ) (solo)
- Barry Pinchbeck ( (Australia) ) (speedcar)
- Garry Rush ( (Australia) ) (sprintcar/super modified/speedcar)
- Johnny Rutherford ( (United States) ) (speedcar)
- Mitch Shirra ( (New Zealand) ) (solo)
- Brooke Tatnell ( (Australia) ) (sprintcar)
- George Tatnell ( (Australia) ) (sprintcar/super modified/speedcar) †
- Ron "Sleepy" Tripp ( (United States) ) (speedcar)
- Billy Sanders ( (Australia) ) (solo) †
- Bobby Schwartz ( (United States) ) (solo)
- Mitch Shirra ( (New Zealand) ) (solo)
- Dennis Sigalos ( (United States) ) (solo)
- "Big" Ed Wilbur ( (United States) ) (sedan)

† - Deceased
