= Sleepy Tripp =

American racing driver

- Born: Ron Tripp; August 13, 1953 (age 73) Costa Mesa, California, U.S.

Ron "Sleepy" Tripp (born August 13, 1953) is an American Hall of Fame midget car driver. Tripp got his nickname as a youth when he would fall asleep in his quarter midget car while waiting for his next race to start.

== Midget car career ==
Tripp won the 1975 and 1976 United States Automobile Club (USAC) National Midget championships. He stayed on the national tour for several more years before he started racing in the Western States series, on the West Coast. He consistently placed first or second in the series points, winning championships in 1983, 1985, 1987, 1988, 1990, 1991 and 1992. He reached his 100th win May 2, 1998 at Ventura Raceway. Sleepy sits on top of the Western States feature list with 104 wins.

He also had 59 National Midget car victories, which places him fifth on USAC's all-time National Midget Car series feature winners list. And those 59 National USAC total victories, placing him 11th on USAC's all-time National career feature victory leaders list. His combined National, Western and Regional USAC wins have him the winningest driver in midgets. With over 250 career wins to his name.

== Hall of Fame inductions ==
- 1986 – Inducted in the National Midget Auto Racing Hall of Fame.
- 1999 – Inducted in the 'Daily Pilot Sports' Hall of Fame
- 2000 – Inducted in the Belleville National Midget Auto Racing Museum.
- 2004 – Inducted in the 'Legends of Ascot' Hall of Fame.
- 2015 – Inducted into the USAC 'Hall of Fame'

== History ==
"Sleepy" was born Ronald James Tripp to parents Barbara and Gerald Tripp, August 13, 1953, and he was raised with his older brother, Bob and younger sister, Karen in Costa Mesa, California. Growing up in a racing family had the boys racing at a very young age, winning their way into the record books. The boys raced in Quarter midgets, winning numerous trophies along the way. They then tried their hand in motorcycles, before jumping up to the full-size midget cars. During Sleepy's high school years, he was a wrestler and accomplished football star at Newport Harbor High School, being named MVP and Captain for their 1970 League Championship football season. Last played in July 1971 at the Aloha All Star Football Classic at Honolulu Stadium. Has been married to Erin since Nov 1982, whom he met in New Zealand while racing, they have one daughter, Shay, who is married and has recently made Sleepy and Erin grandparents. Both of Sleepy's parents have since passed and the boys still work together at their family's electrical contracting business.

== USAC years ==
After Sleepy took the 'Rookie of the Year' and USRC 1974 Championship he then headed for the Midwest and tried his luck with USAC, taking 'Rookie of the Year' honors and Championship in 1975 and then again winning the USAC Championship back-to-back in 1976. He was invited to race in Australia during their 1976/77 season, along with Johnny Rutherford (who was that years Indianapolis 500 winner). In turn, Sleepy raced 17-years in either Australia, New Zealand or both. He raced with USAC National series, until he returned to California to race the newly formed USAC Western States Championship, in which he joined car owners George and Gary Zarounian, to dominate the early years, winning the 1983, 85, 87, 88, 90, 91, 92 Championships. During those years, he won 104 features, putting him at the top of the feature win list. His racing career ended after crashing at a USAC/BCRA race at Stockton, California, in 2003.

== New Zealand/Australia ==
First invited to tour 'down-under' through Australia and New Zealand in 1976/77 where he began to win races and fans for nearly two decades. After running his own car for six years, he teamed up with car owner, Danny Lendich, winning many of the prestigious races, such as the 50 Lap Classic, the World 30 Lap Derby, Bob Tattersal Memorial, Ross Goonan Memorial and the City of Auckland Grand Prix. In all, he has 34 feature wins at Western Springs Speedway in Auckland.

Tripp also had success in Australia during the 1970s and 1980s with many feature wins including winning the 1983 and 1984 Australian Speedcar Grand Prix on the paved Liverpool City Raceway, as well as both the Harry Neal and Rick Harvey Memorial's and the 40 Lap Speedcar Derby at Adelaide's Speedway Park. Despite regularly beating the local drivers, Tripp's laid back nature, and his style of car set up and driving which often involved racing with the left (inside) front wheel not even touching the track, proved popular with Australian crowds.

In the 80's, his name and popularity extend motor racing, as there was a racing horse, greyhound and rock band all named 'Sleepy Tripp'. Still today there is a trotter racing down-under with his name.

== Accomplishments ==
- 1974 – USRC 'Rookie' and Champion
- 1975 – USAC 'Rookie' and National Champion
- 1976 – USAC National Champion
- 1976 – Volkswagen 'Driver of the Year' Midget Division
- 1979 – Night Before the 500 Midget race winner
- 1983–85–87–88–90–91–92 – USAC Western States Champion
- 1985 and 1987 Belleville High Banks Nationals Champion
- 1986 – was the youngest driver to be inducted into the National Midget Hall of Fame.
- Won over 250 career feature wins
- 104 USAC Western States Midget wins
- Won 18 USAC Features in the 1988 season
- Won 33 features at Ascot Park – (12 wins coming in 1983–84)
- 3 Time winner of ESPN Thursday Night Thunder Series at Ascot Park – 1989
- Scored his record 132nd win, May 4, 1991 at El Centro, California – to make him the winningest driver in combined USAC (National, Western and Regional) wins
- Won features in four different countries: USA, Canada, Australia and New Zealand
- 9 Time New Zealand '50 Lap Classic' Winner – 1979, 1981, 1982, 1983, 1984, 1985, 1987, 1988, 1994
- 5 Time New Zealand '30 Lap Derby' Winner – 1978, 1981, 1982, 1984, 1987
- 3 Time 'Bob Tattersall Memorial' Winner – 1980, 1981, 1982
- 2 Time 'City of Auckland' Midget Grand Prix Winner – 1983, 1985
- 2 Time 'New Zealand' Midget Car Grand Prix – 1978, 1980
- 2 Time 'Ross Goonan Memorial' – 1977, 1978
- 2 Time Australian Speedcar Grand Prix winner
- Harry Neale Memorial winner (Australia)
- Rick Harvey Memorial winner (Australia)
- 40 Lap Speedcar Derby winner (Australia)

== More Recently ==
On the afternoon of October 7th, 2012, on his way home from a weekend away in Mammoth, he crashed his motorcycle and was airlifted to Antelope Valley Hospital, where he spent a month in the ICU. He was then moved to Brea Kindred Rehab to learn to walk again. Sleepy and Erin spent their 30th wedding anniversary at this facility. He was released to go home the end of January, only to end up at Hoag Hospital with a heart infection, where he spent six weeks on a regimented medicated cleansing at Crystal Cove Rehab. Once the infection was resolved, he was released to go home.

== More Honors ==
- 2013 Grand Marshall for the '73rd Turkey Night Grand Prix', held at Perris Auto Speedway
- 2019 Co-Grand Marshall (with Gary Zarounian) for the '79th Turkey Night Grand Prix, held at Ventura Raceway.
