= Lismore Speedway =

Racing track in NSW, Australia

- Location: Lismore, New South Wales, Australia
- Coordinates: 28.7956°S 153.2742°E
- Operator: Mick and Kim Sauer
- Opened: 1969
- Former names: Lucas Oil Lismore Speedway
- Major events: East Coast Grand National, Australian Speedcar Grand Prix
- Website: lismorespeedway.com.au
- Surface: Clay and sand mix
- Length: 0.4 km (0.25 mi)
- Banking: slight
- Race lap record: 0:10.460 (Luke Oldfield, Sprintcar, 2018, Sprintcars)

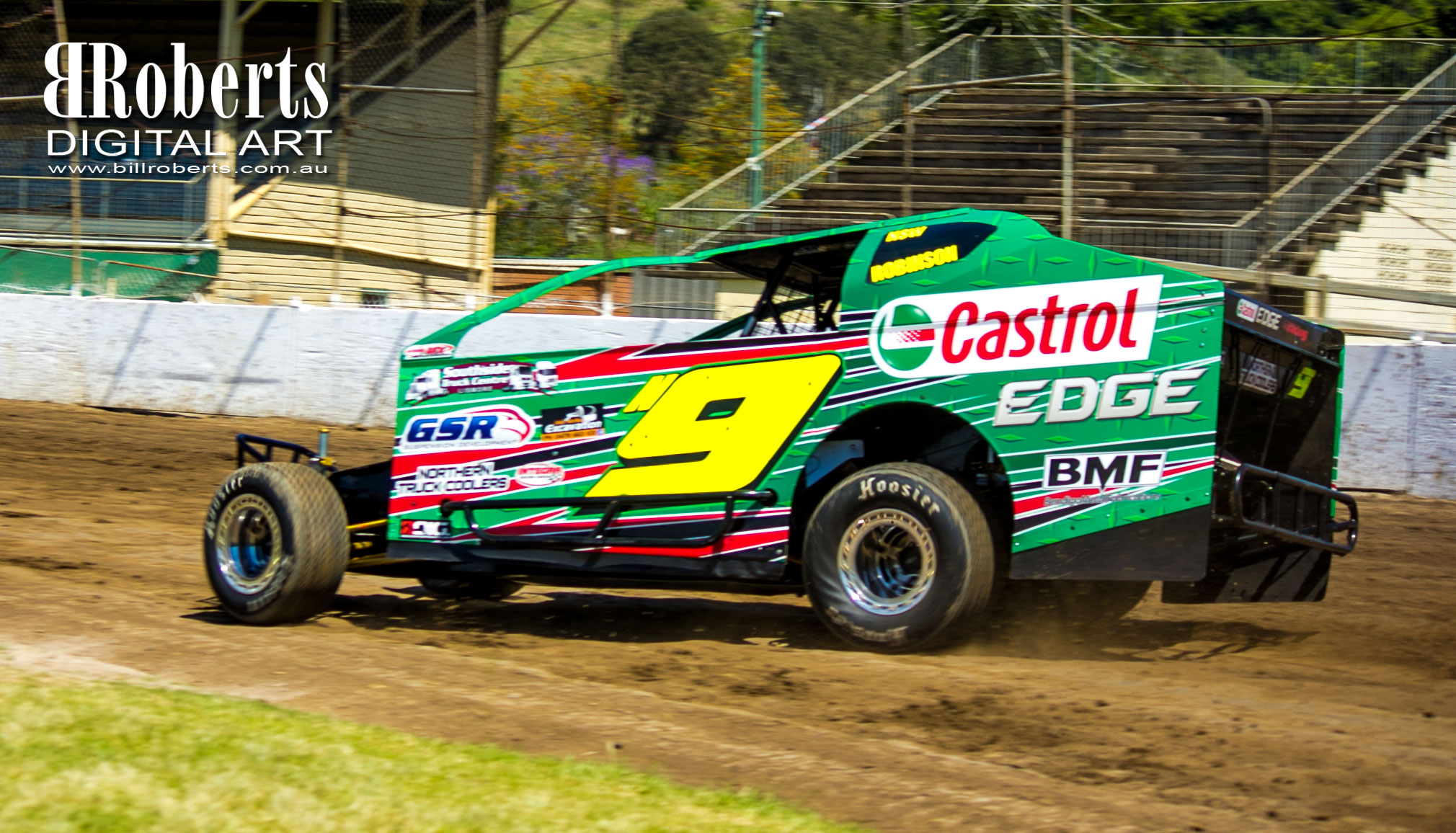
Mark Robinson at Castrol Edge Lismore Speedway

Lismore Speedway (also known as Castrol Edge Lismore Speedway) is a dirt track racing venue located at Lismore Showground Lismore, New South Wales. It hosts a variety of motor sports and other events throughout the year.

The track is often referred to as "The Home of Champions'.

== History ==
The Speedway at its current location at Lismore Showground was founded on 22 November 1969 by Dutton Stibbard and Neil Mansell. The Showground is used for non-racing events such as markets and the regional show. It hosted a baseball game in 1972 and a cricket match in 1994. It was severely impacted by Cyclone Debbie which caused extensive flooding across the region, including flooding the Speedway track and buildings. The facility celebrated its 50th anniversary in 2018.

The track has previously run both motorcycles and sidecars.

Today it hosts a variety of Speedway racing events. These include Sprintcars, Speedcar, Super Sedans, V8 Dirt Modifieds, Late Models and other open wheel and sedan classes. Other entertainment at the track includes monster trucks.

The track suffered from major flooding during the 2022 Lismore floods resulting in the remainder of the 2021/2022 season being cancelled. New promoters, Mick and Kim Sauer, who took over the track from David Lander one week prior to the 2022 Lismore floods, set about restoring and revamping the Speedway with it reopening for the 2022/2023 season on November 5 2022.

In a first for the region, Lismore Speedway ended the 2022/2023 season with a concert by Country Music Star Adam Brand on Sunday June 11 2023. The meeting, held over the 2023 June Long weekend, saw the running of the NSW SSA Junior title on Saturday June 10 and four 50 lap feature races on Sunday June 11 for Production Sedans, Wingless Sprints, AMCA Nationals and RSA Street Stockers in what was possibly a first in Australia.

Lismore Speedway won the Speedway Australia Award for the Most Improved Speedway in Australia for the 2022/2023 season.

== Racing Categories ==
Categories that race at Lismore Speedway include:

- V8 Dirt Modifieds.
- Wingless Sprints.
- AMCA Nationals.
- RSA Street Stockers.
- Junior Sedans (combined).
- SSA Production Sedans.
- SSA Modified Sedans.
- Sprintcars.
- Speedcars (Midgets).
- Compact Speedcars.
- Late Models.
- Formula 500s (F500).
- Legend Cars.

== Feature Events ==
Lismore Speedway regularly hosts the prestigious East Coast Grand National (ECGN) sedan race.

The East Coast Grand National is a sedan event steeped in wonderful history at the Lismore Speedway. The heritage of the race traces back to the mid-seventies. In 2010, Tania Smith took honours in a race that season which honoured the late, great Lismore national titleholder and former ECGN winner, Grenville Anderson. Darren Kane won the 2011 East Coast Grand National from start to finish in a race that went without interruption. Production Sedans contested the 2021 ECGN in 2021. In 2023, Australian Super Sedan Champion Matt Pascoe was crowned the East Coast Grand National Champion at Lismore Speedway.

The track regularly hosts the historic Australian Speedcar Grand Prix (AGP).

The AGP is an annual dirt track racing meeting for Speedcars, also known as Midgets. The AGP has a rich history dating back to 1938, when it was first held at the Sydney Sports Ground. The AGP is one of the most prestigious and coveted titles in Australian speedway racing, attracting some of the best drivers from Australia and overseas. Past winners include legends such as Ray Revell, Bob Tattersall, Andy McGavin, Johnny Stewart, A.J. Foyt, Steve Kinser, Lealand McSpadden, Garry Rush and Max Dumesny.

The winner of the 2023 AGP held at Castrol Edge Lismore Speedway was Rusty Whittaker.

== Title Events ==
The track regularly hosts State and National titles including:

- The 2004/2005 NSW V8 Dirt Modified Title won by Stuart Herne.
- The 2005/2006 Australian V8 Dirt Modified title won by Tim Morse (Vic).
- The 2007/2008 Australian Formula 500 Championship won by Michael Pronger (QLD).
- The 2008/2009 Australian Super Sedan title won by Darren Kane.
- The 2010/2011 Australian V8 Dirt Modified title won by Peter Britten.
- The 2010/2011 Australian Speedcar title won by Davey Ray (US).
- The 2013/2014 Australian V8 Dirt Modified title won by David Clark.
- The 2015/2016 Australian AMCA Nationals title won by Matt Hardy (QLD).
- The Queensland Speedcar State Title for the first time in 2019.
- The 2022/2023 NSW Late Model Title won by Lachlan Onley.
- The 2022/2023 Australian V8 Dirt Modified Title won by Mitch Randall.
- The 2022/2023 NSW Super Sedan Title won by Matt Pascoe.
- The 2022/2023 NSW Modified Sedan Title won by Nathan Macdonald.
- The 2022/2023 NSW Junior Sedan Title won by Jaiden Santin.

== Track ==
The track is 400 metres long on the pole. It is predominantly circular and constructed with a clay and sand mix. The track is 15 metres wide which is designed to provide room for side-by-side racing.

The track boasts two major covered grandstands, a number of uncovered grandstands and catering facilities.

Meetings are often streamed live and available for replay on Clay Per View.

== Lap Records ==
Driver	Date	Laps	Time
Sprintcars
Luke Oldfield	1 April 2018	1	0:10.770
Steve Caunt	9 May 2009	2	0:22.279
David Muir	20 April 2013	6	1:18.419
Matt Brown	9 May 2009	8	1:28.705
Luke Oldfield	1 April 2018	10	1:54.717
Formula 500
Charlie Brown	20 November 2010	1	0:12.826
Nathan Pronger	8 May 2010	8	1:43.006
Chris Alcorn	23 February 2008	20	3:41.63
V8 Dirt Modifieds
Kevin Britten	9 April 2011	1	0:12.902
Luke Oldfield	26 December 2008	2	0:26.68
Luke Oldfield	23 March 2008	6	1:18.64
Jai Stephenson	1 November 2014	8	1:44.267
David Clark	30 March 2013	10	2:10.851
Ray Eggins	24 January 2010	12	3:06.445
Scott Cannon	24 January 2009	15	3:24.78
Mark Robinson	15 March 2014	20	4:53.912
Andrew Pezzutti	26 December 2007	25	6:34.47
Speedcars
Bryan Clauson	31 January 2015	1	0:12.8
Michael Pickens	31 January 2015	2	0:26.1
Sid Whittaker	10 April 2010	6	1:23.394
Ken Stanaway	7 March 2009	8	1:45.64
Hayden Williams	31 January 2015	10	2:11. 6
Matt Smith	18 February 2011	12	2:40.620
Grant Drainey	19 January 2008	15	3:38.91
Michael Kendall	31 January 2014	20	5:07.031
Brad Mosen	31 January 2014	25	6:10.554
Litre Sprints
Mike Davis	20 November 2010	1	0:13.696
Tony Brearley	8 April 2012	2	0:26.661
Kurt Wilson	3 November 2012	6	1:20.073
Kurt Wilson	15 January 2016	8	1:39.835
Craig Smith	5 January 2013	12	2:39.655
Kurt Wilson	22 March 2014	15	3:13.013
Craig Smith	23 March 2013	20	4:31.458
Tony Brearley	7 January 2012	25	5:57.198
Super Sedans
Matt Pascoe	7 June 2008	1	0:13.977
Michael Nicola	25 April 2009	6	1:29.139
Darren Kane	26 March 2011	8	1:49.172
Wayne Randall	29 November 2008	10	2:20.780
Matt Pascoe	21 February 2009	12	3:08.057
Jamie McHugh	8 December 2007	30	7:26.65
Darren Kane	26 March 2011	50	11:49.553
Wingless Sprints
Trent Martin	5 November 2011	1	0:14.439
Robert Mazzer	6 January 2016	8	1:52.8
Mitchell Haynes	16 January 2016	10	2:20. 5
David Eggins	5 January 2013	12	2:59.067
David Eggins	10 April 2010	15	3:35.56
Mitchell Haynes	19 April 2014	20	4:50.573
Kevin Willis	16 January 2016	100	24:49.932
AMCA Nationals
Russ Hardy	26 MArch 2011	1	0:15.053
Russ Hardy	26 March 2011	2	0:29.647
Brayd Stephenson	30 March 2013	8	2:01.706
Brayd Stephenson	7 January 2012	10	2:38.981
Ed Doherty	8 May 2010	1	3:22.38
Shane Newstead	2 November 2013	15	3:54.416
Geoff Hayes	15 November 2014	20	5:06.549
Stuart Hall	9 January 2016	30	7:48.451
Junior Sedans
Ryan Gorton	17 December 2011	1	00:16.8
Mitchell Haynes	26 March 2011	2	00:34.8
Kurt Wilson	7 June 2008	6	01:44.6
Brock Armstrong	7 February 2009	8	02:16.1
Kurt Wilson	1 November 2008	10	02:54.4
Kurt Wilson	23 February 2008	12	03:01.9
Kurt Wilson	4 April 2010	15	04:18.3
Ryan Gorton	17 December 2011	20	05:59.2
