= Angell Park Speedway =

Race track in Sun Prairie, WI

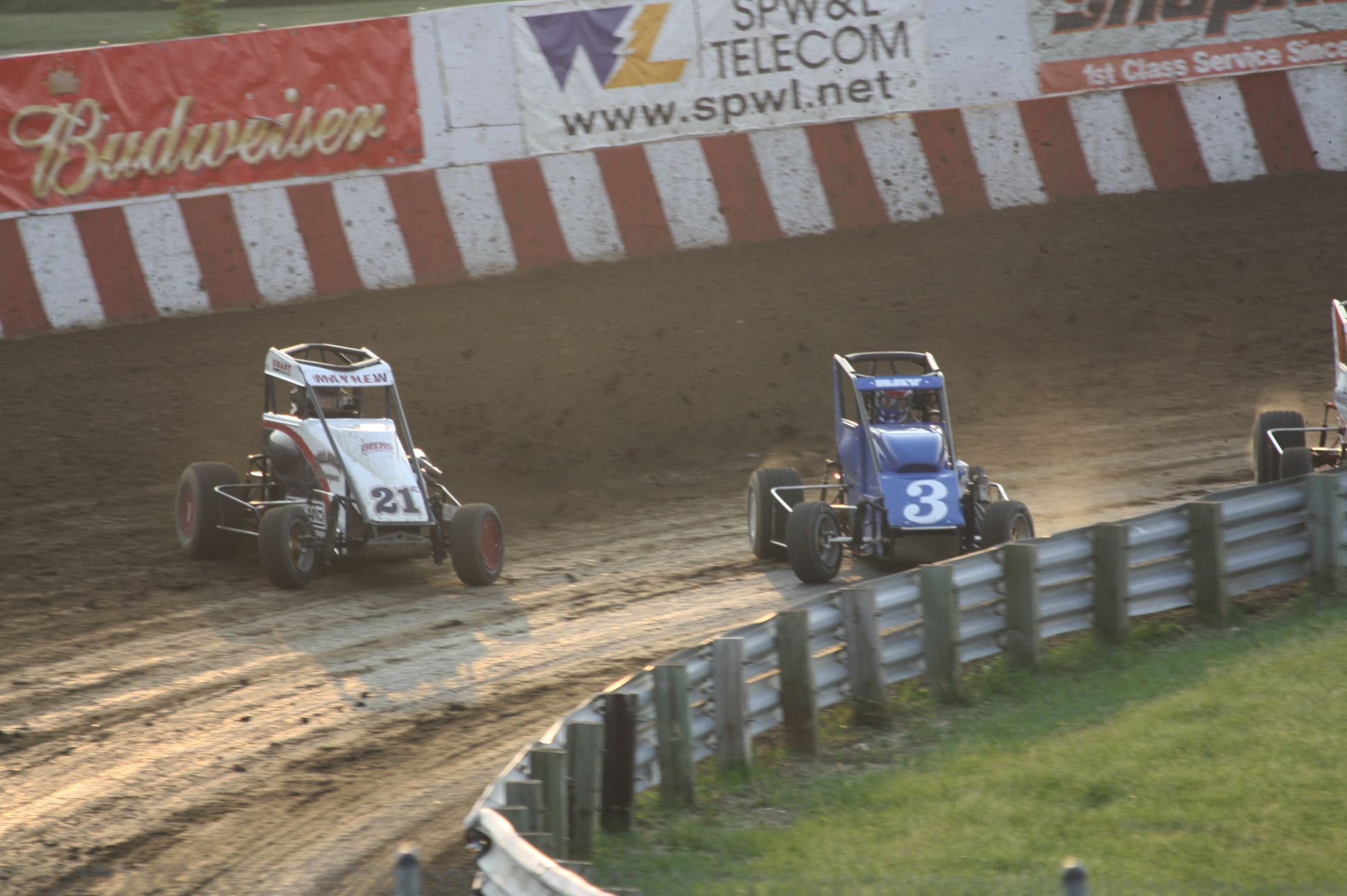
- Location: Sun Prairie, Wisconsin
- Coordinates: 43°10′40″N 89°12′40″W
- Opened: 1936
- Major events: USAC Midgets; IRA Sprint Cars
- Website: http://www.angellpark.net/

Oval
- Surface: Dirt
- Length: 0.34 mi (.54 km)
- Turns: 4
- Race lap record: 14.316 (Bryan Clauson, 2015, USAC Midget)

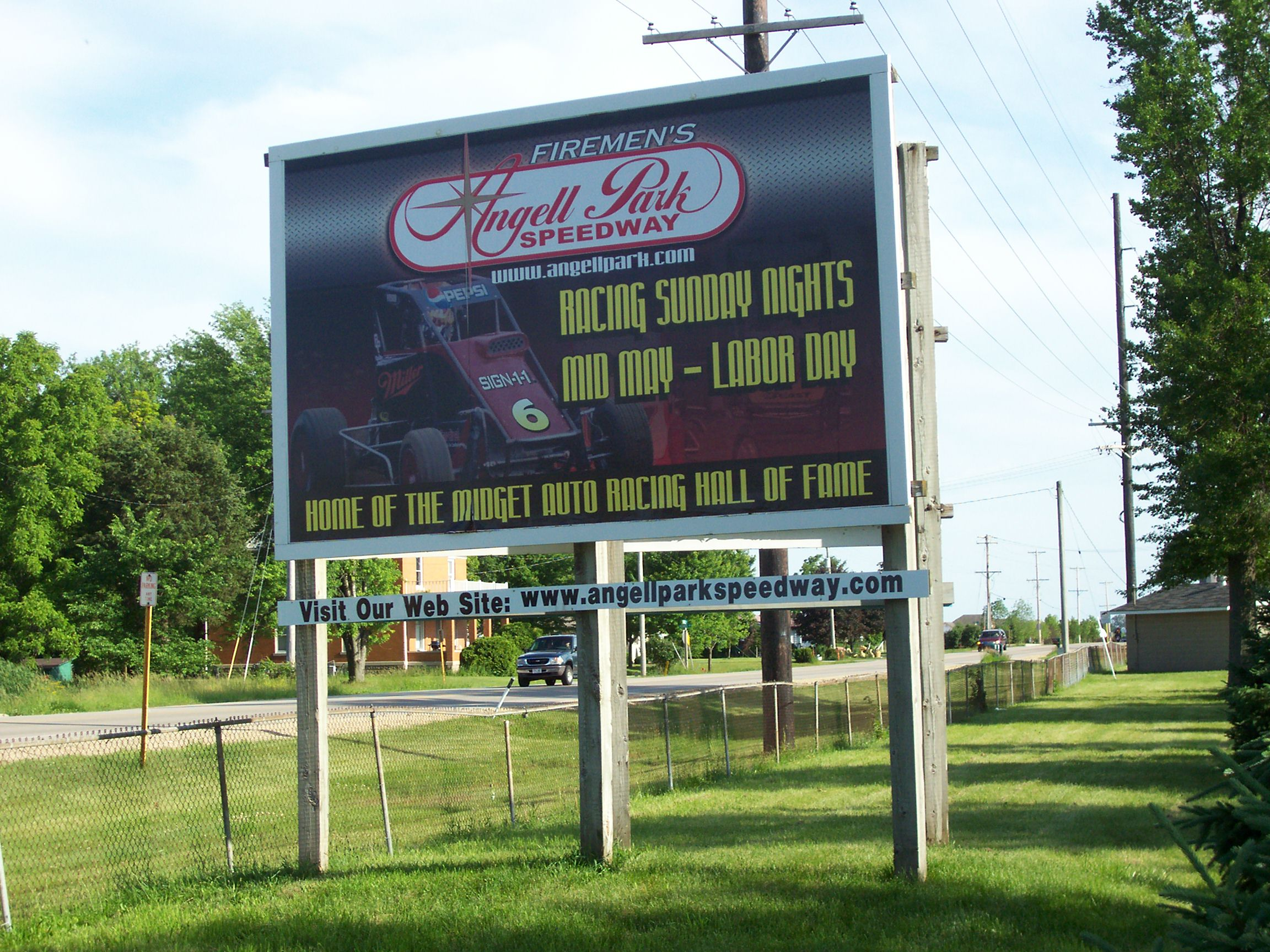
Welcome sign

Angell Park Speedway is a 1/3 mile (0.54 km) dirt racetrack located in Sun Prairie, Wisconsin. The track has been run by the city's fire department since 1903. Racing occurs every Sunday approximately Memorial Day until Labor Day. Special racing events and the weather may alter the schedule. The races were sanctioned by the Badger Midget Auto Racing Association (BMARA), the oldest midget organization in the world. Some events are co-sanctioned by the United States Automobile Club (USAC). BMARA sanctions several midget car events at other nearby tracks. The World of Outlaws held their first sprint car races at the track in August 2016.

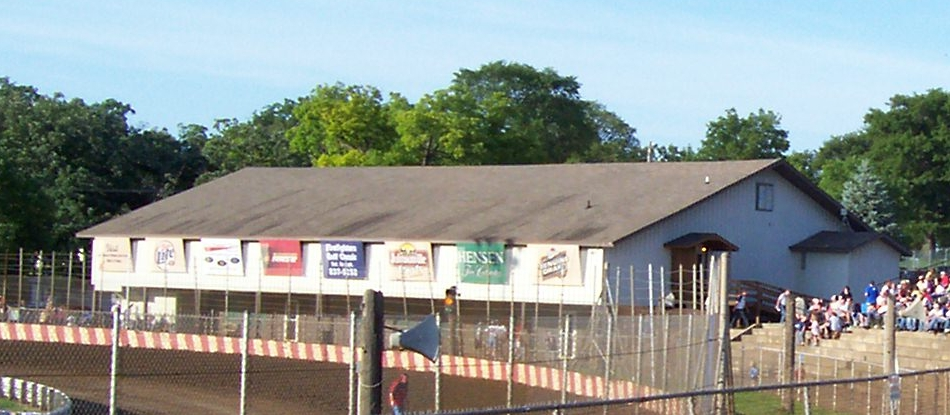
National Midget Auto Racing Hall of Fame building in turn 1

In addition to the racetrack, the facility features the National Midget Auto Racing Hall of Fame, a pavilion, and the Sun Prairie Firemans Park in the Prairie. The park was built by the Sun Prairie community on September 18, 2007, and was dedicated on October 7, 2007. The project was led by Sun Prairie residents Rebecca Ketelson and Anita Holcomb. Leather's and Associates was the project architect.

== History ==
The part was donated by Col. William Angell to the Sun Prairie Fire Department in 1903. The track is nationally known for its midget car races, which began racing in 1936. As of the 2008 season, it is the only track in the United States to host weekly midget car races. The track was closed between 1942 and 1945, since all racing in the United States was halted during World War II.

The Badger Midget Auto Racing Association (BMARA) began sanction at the track in 1946 when racing resumed after World War II. Night racing at Angell Park began in 1948. With the lights installed, Kelly Peters of Lake Forest, IL set fast time, won his heat and captured the first feature race run under the lights. From that point forward, weekly Sunday night racing has been held at the facility except for a few shortened seasons for minor contract disputes in the late 1960s and early 1970s.

The track began hosting its first non-midget car races in 2007 when an occasional touring event was added to its program and by 2010 every race evening featured a class from another track or a touring series. The Angell Park Speedway board and the sanctioning body BMARA had a fall out before the 2010 season. The track ran its own sanction during May 2010. At the end of the month weekly track operation halted for the 2010 season except for special events (two USAC midget weekends and the Fireman's Nationals). The track returned to occasional events in 2011 including BMARA sanction.

The track was closed in 2020 due to the COVID-19 pandemic. In January 2021, Hans Lein and SLS Promotions were announced as promoters of the track. In February 2021, Gregg McKarns was announced as the new promoter of the track instead. McKarns also promotes Madison International Speedway and the ARCA Midwest Tour. Angell Park hosted its first USAC Midget race at the track since 2015 and 47th overall. Tanner Thorson won his seventh race of the season.

== Notable racers ==
Some midget car drivers come from New Zealand and Australia during their country's winter to race during the United States' summer between May and September. The 2008 season featured Michael Pickens from Auckland, New Zealand (who stayed at one of the other driver's house) and Matt Smith from Newcastle, Australia.

Several notable racers raced at the track in its regular weekly series:

- Justin Allgaier
- Tom Bigelow
- A. J. Fike
- Aaron Fike (2002 BMARA champion)
- Stan Fox (1979 BMARA champion)
- Jeff Gordon (four-time NASCAR Cup Series Champion)
- Mel Kenyon
- Michael Pickens (many time New Zealand National Midget champion)
- Landy Scott (1947 BMARA champion and BMARA president from 1951 to 1959)

== Fireman Nationals ==
The track's most notable event is its 50 lap Fireman Nationals midget car event.

- 1982 (overall) Bill Engelhart
- 1983 Kevin Olson
- 1984 Dan Boorse
- 1985 Rich Vogler
- 1986 Kevin Olson (USAC)
- 1987 Kevin Olson (USAC)
- 1988 Kevin Doty (USAC)
- 1989 Kevin Doty (USAC)
- 1990 Kevin Doty (USAC)
- 1991 Stevie Reeves (USAC)
- 1992 Marty Davis
- 1993 Page Jones (Parnelli Jones' son)
- 1994 Kevin Doty
- 1995 Kevin Doty
- 1996 Randy Koch
- 1997 Kevin Olson
- 1998 Kevin Olson
- 1999 Dan Boorse
- 2000 Jay Drake
- 2001 Tracy Hines
- 2002 Tracy Hines
- 2003 Davey Ray
- 2004 Scott Hatton
- 2005 Scott Hatton
- 2006 (rained out)
- 2007 Jerry Coons Jr.
- 2008 Brady Bacon
- 2009 Josh Wise (USAC)
- 2010 Tracy Hines (USAC)
- 2011 (rained out)
- 2012 Caleb Armstrong
- 2013 Zach Daum
- 2014 Tanner Thorson (USAC)
- 2015 Rico Abreu (USAC)
- 2016 Carson Macedo (POWRI) / Robbie Ray (BMARA)
- 2017 Zach Daum
- 2018 Tanner Carrick
- 2019 Logan Seavey (POWRI)
- 2020 not held (COVID)
- 2021 Tanner Thorson (USAC)

Reference (1982-2020):

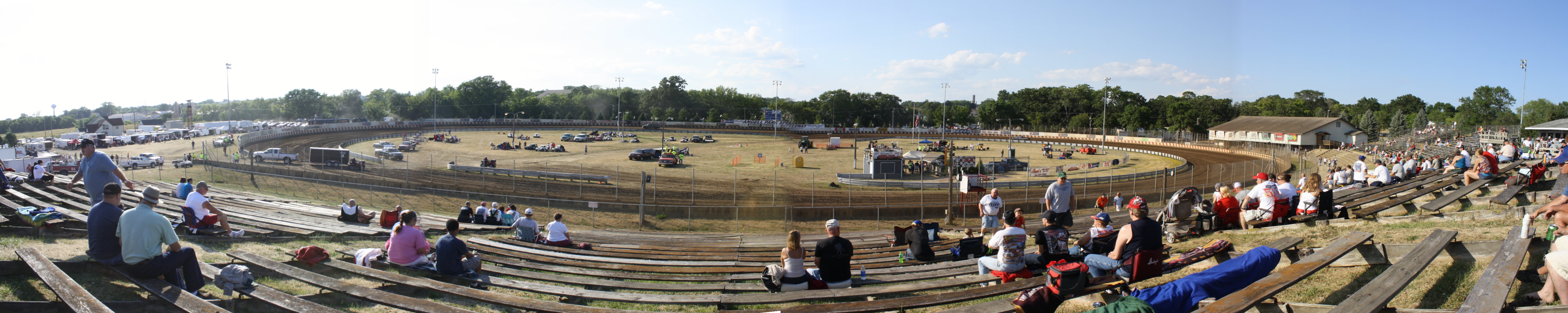
Angell Park Speedway, 2012
