= Australian Speedcar Grand Prix =

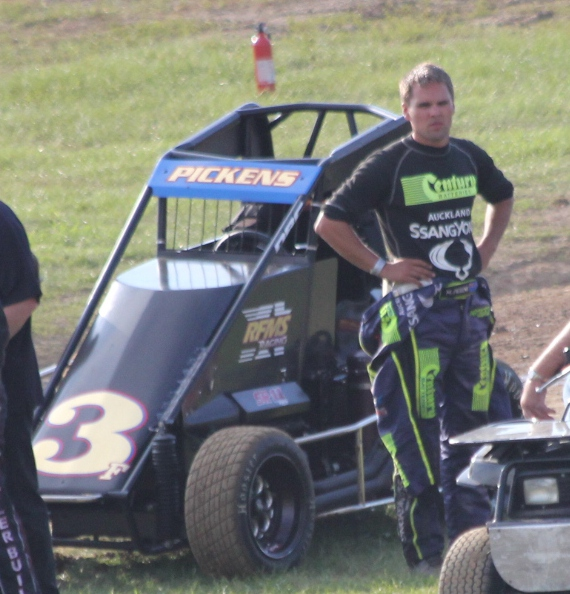
2005 winner Michael Pickens

The Australian Speedcar Grand Prix is an annual dirt track racing meeting held in Australia for Speedcars. The meeting has traditionally been held in Sydney, but on occasions has been held on tracks in Victoria and in 2000 the race was held at Perth's Claremont Speedway, not long before the 1/3-mile Showground track closed.

The first Australian Speedcar Grand Prix was held on 12 March 1938 at the Sydney Sports Ground and was won by Sydney-based driver Les Dillon (Dillon would tragically become the first competitor killed in a crash at the Sports Ground just two months later). The next Speedcar Grand Prix wasn't held until 1947 and was the first of 33 times the race was held at the Sydney Showground until its closure in 1996.

The magical Sydney Showground held the event for 33 times where it was won the first time in 1947 by Ray Revell and the last by Garry Rush in 1996.

Along the way winners included five-time winner Ray Revell, American superstar Bob "Two-Gun" Tattersall (three times winner) five-time winner Andy McGavin, 'Leadfoot' Lenny Brock, Jeff Freeman, Johnny Stewart, Ray Oram, Ken Morton, Englishman Bill Reynolds, Ronald Mackay, Americans Dave Strickland and Jimmy Davies, 'Gorgeous' George Tatnell and Queenslander Danny Davidson.

From 1975 until 1984 when it was held at the Liverpool Speedway in Sydney the Grand Prix was run on asphalt due to Liverpool being a semi-banked 1/4-mile paved track during that time. Liverpool reverted to having a clay surface in 1985 and since 1986 the race has been run on the more traditional dirt track speedways. Drivers from the United States bookend the asphalt Grand Prix years with legendary four time Indianapolis 500 winner A. J. Foyt winning in 1975 and 1976 in a Volkswagen powered car while 1986 National Midget Auto Racing Hall of Fame member Ron "Sleepy" Tripp would win the last two asphalt Grand Prix's in 1983 and 1984, also using a VW powered car.

Of the eleven times the race was held at Liverpool City Raceway the winner's list sees names like Garry Rush, Barry Graham, Stan Lawrence, Barry Pinchbeck, Ron Hutchinson, Ian Saville and American giants Ron 'Sleepy' Tripp and AJ Foyt.

One of the greatest Sprintcar drivers of all time Steve Kinser even won the event in 1986.

In 1990 'the Grand Prix' returned to the Sydney Showground where American Johnny Pearson, Sydney's Aaron Benny and Troy Jenkins and even Victorian Sprintcar hero Max Dumesny drove to victory lane.

In 1994 and 1995 it was held in Wangaratta (Keith Giles WA won) and Heathcote where American Lealand McSpadden was victorious.

As a one off the Sydney Showground closed for the final time in 1996 and fittingly Garry Rush was the victor.

For the next three years NSW drivers had a mortgage on the event as it was held at Parramatta City Raceway and Newcastle Motordrome where Troy Jenkins won twice and Steven Graham once.

In 2000 the final season at Perth's Claremont Speedway saw the only appearance of the AGP outside the East Coast of Australia and Perth supremo Michael Figliomeni was the victor standing alongside Keith Giles as the only West Aussies to win to that point.

Newcastle's Adam Clarke won in 2001 at "PCR" and then the event went to Victoria's Avalon Raceway near Geelong for the next seven years where victors included Darren Jenkins, West Aussie Dene McAllan, Victorian veteran Ian "Fly" Lewis, and West Aussie Keith Giles for the second time.

Victorian star Mark Brown won the first two of his eventual six AGP victories at Avalon before winning the next four of his win-list at Nowra Speedway in NSW.

New Zealand stand out Michael Pickens is the only driver from New Zealand to win the AGP – a feat he achieved at Avalon in 2005.

Newcastle's Matt Smith won at Valvoline Raceway in 2011, Queenslander Anthony Chaffey won at Nowra in 2016, Nathan Smee won in 2017 at Valvoline Raceway, fourth generation racer Reid Mackay won at Gunnedah in 2018 and Matt Smith recorded his second win at Lismore in 2019.

On 1 January 2020 Carson Macedo from California USA racing for the Sean Dyson Complete Racing team won the race making this his 3rd win in Speedcars at Valvoline Raceway during his Speedweek campaign.

On 3 February 2024, former Australian Speedcar champion Kaidon Brown placed another AGP win in the family trophy cabinet, adding to his father Mark Brown’s 6 wins prior. Mark experienced great success in this very race, with 4 wins in a row from 2013 to 2015 at Nowra Speedway, his two prior victories coming at Avalon in 2004 and 2009.

== Winners since 1938 ==
| Year | Venue | City/State | Winner |
| 1938 | Sydney Sports Ground | Sydney, NSW | Les Dillon (NSW) |
| Year | Venue | City/State | Winner |
| 1947 | Sydney Showground Speedway | Sydney, NSW | Ray Revell (NSW) |
| 1948 | Sydney Showground Speedway | Sydney, NSW | Cal Niday ( (United States) ) |
| 1949 | Sydney Showground Speedway | Sydney, NSW | Frank Brewer ( (New Zealand) / (United States) )** |
| Year | Venue | City/State | Winner |
| 1950 | Sydney Showground Speedway | Sydney, NSW | Ray Revell (NSW) |
| 1951 | Sydney Showground Speedway | Sydney, NSW | Ray Revell (NSW) |
| 1952 | Sydney Showground Speedway | Sydney, NSW | Ray Revell (NSW) |
| 1953 | Sydney Showground Speedway | Sydney, NSW | Ray Revell (NSW) |
| 1954 | Sydney Showground Speedway | Sydney, NSW | Andy McGavin (NSW) |
| 1955 | Sydney Showground Speedway | Sydney, NSW | Andy McGavin (NSW) |
| 1956 | Sydney Showground Speedway | Sydney, NSW | Bill Reynolds ( (United Kingdom) ) |
| 1957 | Sydney Showground Speedway | Sydney, NSW | Andy McGavin (NSW) |
| 1958 | Sydney Showground Speedway | Sydney, NSW | Len Brock (NSW) |
| 1959 | Sydney Showground Speedway | Sydney, NSW | Andy McGavin (NSW) |
| Year | Venue | City/State | Winner |
| 1960 | Sydney Showground Speedway | Sydney, NSW | Bob Tattersall ( (United States) ) |
| 1961 | Sydney Showground Speedway | Sydney, NSW | Andy McGavin (NSW) |
| 1962 | Sydney Showground Speedway | Sydney, NSW | Bob Tattersall ( (United States) ) |
| 1963 | Sydney Showground Speedway | Sydney, NSW | Jimmy Davies ( (United States) ) |
| 1964 | Sydney Showground Speedway | Sydney, NSW | Ken Morton (NSW) |
| 1965 | Sydney Showground Speedway | Sydney, NSW | Jeff Freeman (NSW) |
| 1966 | Sydney Showground Speedway | Sydney, NSW | Bob Tattersall ( (United States) ) |
| 1967 | Sydney Showground Speedway | Sydney, NSW | Len Brock (NSW) |
| 1968 | Sydney Showground Speedway | Sydney, NSW | Johnny Stewart (NSW) |
| 1969 | Sydney Showground Speedway | Sydney, NSW | Bob Tattersall ( (United States) ) |
| Year | Venue | City/State | Winner |
| 1970 | Sydney Showground Speedway | Sydney, NSW | Ray Oram (NSW) |
| 1971 | Sydney Showground Speedway | Sydney, NSW | Ronald Mackay (NSW) |
| 1972 | Sydney Showground Speedway | Sydney, NSW | Dave Strickland ( (United States) ) |
| 1973 | Sydney Showground Speedway | Sydney, NSW | George Tatnell (NSW) |
| 1974 | Sydney Showground Speedway | Sydney, NSW | Danny Davidson (Qld) |
| 1975 | Liverpool Speedway | Sydney, NSW | A. J. Foyt ( (United States) ) |
| 1976 | Liverpool Speedway | Sydney, NSW | A. J. Foyt ( (United States) ) |
| 1977 | Liverpool Speedway | Sydney, NSW | Garry Rush (NSW) |
| 1978♦ | Liverpool Speedway | Sydney, NSW | Stan Lawrence (NSW) |
| 1978♦ | Liverpool Speedway | Sydney, NSW | Barry Pinchbeck (NSW) |
| 1979 | Liverpool Speedway | Sydney, NSW | Barry Graham (NSW) |
| Year | Venue | City/State | Winner |
| 1983 | Liverpool Speedway | Sydney, NSW | Ron "Sleepy" Tripp ( (United States) ) |
| 1984 | Liverpool Speedway | Sydney, NSW | Ron "Sleepy" Tripp ( (United States) ) |
| 1986 | Liverpool Speedway | Sydney, NSW | Steve Kinser ( (United States) ) |
| 1987 | Liverpool Speedway | Sydney, NSW | Ron Hutchinson (NSW) |
| 1988 | Liverpool Speedway | Sydney, NSW | Ian Saville (NSW) |
| Year | Venue | City/State | Winner |
| 1990 | Sydney Showground Speedway | Sydney, NSW | Johnny Pearson ( (United States) ) |
| 1991 | Sydney Showground Speedway | Sydney, NSW | Aaron Benny (NSW) |
| 1992 | Sydney Showground Speedway | Sydney, NSW | Max Dumesny (Vic) |
| 1993 | Sydney Showground Speedway | Sydney, NSW | Troy Jenkins (NSW) |
| 1994 | Wangaratta Speedway | Wangaratta, Vic | Keith Giles (WA) |
| 1995 | Heathcote Speedway | Heathcote, Vic | Lealand McSpadden ( (United States) ) |
| 1996 | Sydney Showground Speedway | Sydney, NSW | Garry Rush (NSW) |
| 1997 | Parramatta City Raceway | Sydney, NSW | Troy Jenkins (NSW) |
| 1998 | Parramatta City Raceway | Sydney, NSW | Steven Graham (NSW) |
| 1999 | Newcastle Motordrome | Newcastle, NSW | Troy Jenkins (NSW) |
| Year | Venue | City/State | Winner |
| 2000 | Claremont Speedway | Perth, WA | Michael Figliomeni (WA) |
| 2001 | Parramatta City Raceway | Sydney, NSW | Adam Clarke (NSW) |
| 2003 | Avalon Raceway | Lara, Vic | Darren Jenkins (NSW) |
| 2004 | Avalon Raceway | Lara, Vic | Mark Brown (NSW) |
| 2005 | Avalon Raceway | Lara, Vic | Michael Pickens ( (New Zealand) ) |
| 2006 | Avalon Raceway | Lara, Vic | Dene McAllan (WA) |
| 2008 | Avalon Raceway | Lara, Vic | Ian Lewis (VIC) |
| 2009 | Avalon Raceway | Lara, Vic | Mark Brown (NSW) |
| Year | Venue | City/State | Winner |
| 2010 | Avalon Raceway | Lara, Vic | Keith Giles (NSW) |
| 2011 | Parramatta City Raceway | Granville, NSW | Matt Smith (NSW) |
| 2012 | Nowra Speedway | Nowra, NSW | Mark Brown (NSW) |
| 2013 | Nowra Speedway | Nowra, NSW | Mark Brown (NSW) |
| 2014 | Nowra Speedway | Nowra, NSW | Mark Brown (NSW) |
| 2015 | Nowra Speedway | Nowra, NSW | Mark Brown (NSW) |
| 2016 | Nowra Speedway | Nowra, NSW | Anthony Chaffey (QLD) |
| 2017 | Valvoline Raceway | Parramatta, NSW | Nathan Smee (NSW) |
| 2018 | Gunnedah Speedway | Gunnedah, NSW | Reid Mackay (QLD) |
| 2019 | Lismore Speedway | Lismore, NSW | Matt Smith (NSW) |
| Year | Venue | City/State | Winner |
| 2020 | Valvoline Raceway | Granville, NSW | Carson Macedo (United States) |
| 2023 | Lismore Speedway | Lismore, NSW | Rusty Whittaker (Qld) |
| 2024 | Lismore Speedway | Lismore, NSW | Kaidon Brown (NSW) |

** Frank "Satan" Brewer was from New Zealand but promoters billed him as being from the USA to bring in larger crowds
♦ Two races held in 1978. The first on 1 January and the second on 30 December

== See also ==
- Motorsport in Australia
