= Peter Cunneen =

Australian speedway rider

- Born: 5 July 1926
- Died: 24 November 2007 (aged 81)

Peter Cunneen (5 July 1926 – 24 November 2007) was an Australian speedway driver who competed during the 1950s and 1960s. He won the Australian Speedcar Championship in 1965.

== Career ==
The toughest driver I've raced against? I suppose I would have to say Jeff Freeman, [but] don't get me wrong, Freeman was not as skilled as, say, Peter Cunneen at his peak...

— Three-time Australian Champion, Johnny Stewart

Cunneen raced during a golden age for speedway at the Sydney Showground, competing in 247 feature races at the arena. Cunneen amassed 18 wins, 23 seconds and 29 thirds at the Showground during his career.

Cunneen began his speedway career in the mid-1950s and quickly established himself as one of the country's elite drivers. In 1957, he took 4th place in the NSW Championship, 7th in the Australian Championship and 2nd place in the World Derby. Higher honours did not elude him for long as he claimed both the NSW and QLD Speedcar Championships in 1958.

In 1961, Cunneen competed in the World Derby amongst a host of the era's biggest stars, including state champions, Jack O'Dea (Victoria) and Bruce Rickard (South Australia), and international drivers, Bob Tattersall (USA) and Leroy Warriner (USA). Starting from near the back of the field, Cunneen fought his way through the star-studded line-up to establish a commanding lead. He appeared certain to snare the title when, entering the final lap, a pin sheared in his steering box, sending him careening into the wall of the arena and resulting in one of the most spectacular crashes in Australian Speedway history. Cunneen was thrown from his car, but remained attached to the somersaulting vehicle by his lap belt. Remarkably, he was not seriously injured.

In 1965, at the height of his powers, Cunneen edged out Lew Marshall to become the inaugural winner of the Craven Filter Australian Speedcar Championship. This was the first championship that required drivers to compete across the country and, subsequently, it is considered by some to be the first 'true' Australian Speedcar Championship. In the same year, Cunneen was named as Australian Motorsports Driver of the Year.

Cunneen retired from speedway racing in 1969.

== Achievements ==
- NSW Speedcar Championship (1958)
- QLD Speedcar Championship (1958)
- Australian Speedcar Championship (1965)
- Australian Motorsports Driver of the Year (1965)
