= Australian Speedcar Championship =

The Australian Speedcar Championship is a dirt track motor racing championship held in Australia each year to determine the Australian national champion in Speedcars (otherwise known as midget car racing). The single championship meeting, typically run over two nights in either late January or early February, has been held each year since first being run at the Tracey's Speedway in Melbourne in 1935.

Over the years there have been at times more than one Australian Championship meeting held in Australia (and sometimes in the same city) due to being sanctioned by different governing bodies. There were also times during the 1950s and 1960s when several track promoters around the country staged meetings which they claimed were either an Australian Championship, or sometimes even a World Championship, usually in defiance of not being awarded the right to host the official championship.

While there have been drivers who have won more than one Australian Speedcar Championship, only three drivers have ever won both the national Speedcar championship and the Australian Sprintcar Championship. They are the George Tatnell from Sydney who won the Speedcar title in 1972–73, 1973–74 and 1976–77, plus the Sprintcar championship in 1987–88. Adelaide's Phil March won in his Nissan powered Speedcar in 1985–86, and also won the Sprintcar championship in 1998–99. The third driver was Sydney's Robbie Farr who won the 1997–98 Speedcar title and the 2003–04 Sprintcar championship.

Andy McGavin and Ray Revell from Sydney, with five championships each are the most successful drivers in the championships history (all won before 1964–65). Western Australia's Mike Figliomeni, Warrenne Ekins from Darwin and Adam Clarke from NSW have each won the event four times while five drivers have won the event three times. Twelve drivers from the United States have won the championship.

Australia's first Formula One World Champion Sir Jack Brabham won the event, winning the championship in 1948–49.

The oldest Australian champion was Bob Holt who won the 1998–99 title at the Northline Speedway in Darwin at the age of 58. Holt, originally from Sydney, began racing Speedcars in the early 1960s and was one of the leading competitors at the Sydney Showground during Australian speedway's "golden era".

Unlike other national championship meetings in Australian speedway racing, overseas drivers are permitted in the Australian Speedcar Championship. Ten winners of the title since 2002–03 have been Americans, while one New Zealander Michael Pickens has won the title to date, in 2015–16.

The 2011–12 Australian Speedcar Championship was due to be held on 16–17 March 2012 at the Maryborough Speedway in Maryborough, Queensland. The meeting was cancelled due to inclement weather conditions caused by Cyclone Yasi.

The current (2023–2024) Australian Speedcar Champion is United States driver Justin Grant, who won the title at the Perth Motorplex in WA. The next event is scheduled for the 11th-12th April 2025 at South Australia's Murray Bridge Speedway.

== Winners since 1935 ==
| Year | Venue | City/State | Winner | Runner-up | 3rd place |
| 1935 | | | Bob Finlay (Vic) | | |
| 1935–36 | | | Les Gough (Vic) | | |
| 1936–37 | | | Bert Woodman (SA) | | |
| 1937–38 | | | Harry Shaw (Vic) | | |
| 1938–39 | | | Ted Gray (Vic) | | |
| 1938–39 | | | Beal Simmons (USA) | | |
| 1939–40 | | | Dinny Patterson (NSW) | | |
| 1945–46 | | | Ray Revell (NSW) | | |
| 1947–48 | | | Cal Niday (USA) | | |
| 1948–49 | | | Jack Brabham (NSW) | | |
| 1949–50 | | | Ray Revell (NSW) | | |
| 1950–51 | | | Ray Revell (NSW) | | |
| 1952–53 | | | Ray Revell (NSW) | | |
| 1953–54 | | | Andy McGavin (NSW) | | |
| 1954–55 | | | Andy McGavin (NSW) | | |
| 1955–56 | | | Andy McGavin (NSW) | | |
| 1956–57 | | | Ray Revell (NSW) | | |
| 1957–58 | | | Len Brock (NSW) | | |
| 1958–59 | | | Andy McGavin (NSW) | | |
| 1959–60 | | | Bob Tattersall (USA) | | |
| 1960–61 | | | Andy McGavin (NSW) | | |
| 1961–62 | | | Bob Tattersall (USA) | | |
| 1962–63 | | | Jimmy Davies (USA) | | |
| 1964–65** | Sydney Showground Speedway | Sydney, NSW | Peter Cunneen (NSW) | Lew Marshall (NSW) | Blair Shepherd (Qld) |
| 1965–66** | Sydney Showground Speedway | Sydney, NSW | Johnny Stewart (NSW) | Len Brock (NSW) | Blair Shepherd (Qld) |
| 1966–67** | Sydney Showground Speedway | Sydney, NSW | Johnny Stewart (NSW) | Blair Shepherd (Qld) | Bill Goode (Qld) |
| 1967–68** | Sydney Showground Speedway | Sydney, NSW | Johnny Stewart (NSW) | Howard Revell (NSW) | Barrie Watt (Qld) |
| 1968–69** | Sydney Showground Speedway | Sydney, NSW | Blair Shepherd (Qld) | Bill Goode (Qld) | Barrie Watt (Qld) |
| 1969–70** | Sydney Showground Speedway | Sydney, NSW | Bob Morgan (Qld) | Blair Shepherd (Qld) | Ron Wanless (Qld) |
| Year | Venue | City/State | Winner | Runner-up | 3rd place |
| 1970–71** | Sydney Showground Speedway | Sydney, NSW | Ronald Mackay (NSW) | Johnny Fenton (WA) | Ron Wanless (Qld) |
| 1971–72** | Sydney Showground Speedway | Sydney, NSW | Ronald Mackay (NSW) | Charlie West (WA) | Johnny Fenton (WA) |
| 1972–73** | Sydney Showground Speedway | Sydney, NSW | George Tatnell (NSW) | Col Henning (SA) | Johnny Fenton (WA) |
| 1973–74 | Redline Raceway | Ballarat, Vic | George Tatnell (NSW) | Brian Dillon (Qld) | Johnny Fenton (WA) |
| 1974–75 | Rowley Park Speedway | Adelaide, SA | Johnny Fenton (WA) | Ronald Mackay (NSW) | Greg Anderson (SA) |
| 1975–76 | Liverpool International Speedway | Sydney, NSW | Johnny Fenton (WA) | George Tatnell (NSW) | Ronald Mackay (NSW) |
| 1976–77## | | | George Tatnell (NSW) | Ronald Mackay (NSW) | Johnny Fenton (WA) |
| 1977–78 | Brisbane Exhibition Ground | Brisbane, Qld | Ron Wanless (Qld) | George Tatnell (NSW) | Danny Davidson (Qld) |
| 1978–79 | Claremont Speedway | Perth, WA | Ron Wanless (Qld) | Howard Revell (NSW) | Bill Sutherland (WA) |
| 1979–80## | | | Barry Pinchbeck (NSW) | Johnny Fenton (WA) | |
| Year | Venue | City/State | Winner | Runner-up | 3rd place |
| 1980–81 | Speedway Park | Virginia, SA | Keith Mann (WA) | Steve Stewart (SA) | Terry Wigzell (SA) |
| 1981–82 | Avalon Raceway | Lara, Vic | Keith Mann (WA) | Peter Curtis (NT) | Terry Wigzell (SA) |
| 1982–83 | Archerfield Speedway | Acacia Ridge, Qld | Geoff Pilgrim (WA) | Ian Lewis (Vic) | Ronald Mackay (Qld) |
| 1983–84 | Northline Speedway | Darwin, NT | Keith Mann (WA) | Rex Hodgson (SA) | Danny Davidson (Qld) |
| 1984–85 | Melbourne Speedbowl | Melbourne, Vic | Jim Holden (Qld) | Ray Bishop (Vic) | Jack Porrit (NSW) |
| 1985–86 | Speedway Park | Virginia, SA | Phil March (SA) | Ray Bishop (Vic) | Gary Dillon (SA) |
| 1986–87 | Claremont Speedway | Perth, WA | Tom Watson Sr. (WA) | Gary Dillon (SA) | John Sears (SA) |
| 1987–88 | Parramatta City Raceway | Sydney, NSW | Stephen Gall (NSW) | Paul Lindberg (Qld) | Phil Herreen (SA) |
| 1988–89 | Rockhampton Speedway | Rockhampton, Qld | Graham Jones (WA) | Paul Lindberg (Qld) | Ray Bishop (Vic) |
| 1989–90 | Northline Speedway | Darwin, NT | Warrenne Ekins (NT) | Neville Lance (WA) | Phil Herreen (SA) |
| Year | Venue | City/State | Winner | Runner-up | 3rd place |
| 1990–91 | Claremont Speedway | Perth, WA | Warrenne Ekins (NT) | Graham Jones (WA) | Tom Watson Jnr (WA) |
| 1991–92 | Speedway Park | Virginia, SA | Phil Herreen (SA) | Tom Watson Jnr (WA) | Greg Farrugia (NSW) |
| 1992–93 | Bendigo Raceway | Bendigo, Vic | Warrenne Ekins (NT) | Mike Figliomeni (WA) | Neville Lance (WA) |
| 1993–94 | Parramatta City Raceway | Sydney, NSW | Warrenne Ekins (NT) | Neville Lance (WA) | Rod Bowen (NSW) |
| 1994–95 | Charlton Raceway | Toowoomba, Qld | Mike Figliomeni (WA) | Warrenne Ekins (NT) | Neville Lance (WA) |
| 1995–96 | Claremont Speedway | Perth, WA | Mike Figliomeni (WA) | Warrenne Ekins (NT) | Joe Little (WA) |
| 1996–97 | Newcastle Motordrome | Newcastle, NSW | Craig Brady (NSW) | Troy Jenkins (NSW) | Joe Little (WA) |
| 1997–98 | Avalon Raceway | Lara, Vic | Robbie Farr (NSW) | Troy Jenkins (NSW) | Mark Brown (NSW) |
| 1998–99 | Northline Speedway | Darwin, NT | Bob Holt (NT) | Dave Lambert (NSW) | Toby Gibb (WA) |
| 1999–2000 | Western Auto Raceway | Ballarat, Vic | Mike Figliomeni (WA) | Michael Kendall ( (New Zealand) ) | Shayne Alach ( (New Zealand) ) |
| Year | Venue | City/State | Winner | Runner-up | 3rd place |
| 2000–01 | Speedway Park | Virginia, SA | Adam Clarke (NSW) | Darren Jenkins (NSW) | Craig Brady (NSW) |
| 2000–01 | Archerfield Speedway | Acacia Ridge, Qld | Mike Figliomeni (WA) | Todd Wanless (Qld) | Warrenne Ekins (NT) |
| 2001–02♦ | Speedway City | Virginia, SA | Adam Clarke (NSW) | Brett Morris (NSW) | Joe Little (WA) |
| 2002–03 | Speedway City | Virginia, SA | Cory Kruseman ( (United States) ) | Adam Clarke (NSW) | Craig Brady (NSW) |
| 2003–04 | Speedway City | Virginia, SA | Tony Elliot ( (United States) ) | Brett Morris (NSW) | Lance Beale ( (New Zealand) ) |
| 2004–05 | Perth Motorplex | Perth, WA | Steven Graham (NSW) | Michael Pickens ( (New Zealand) ) | Dene McAllan (WA) |
| 2005–06 | Parramatta City Raceway | Sydney, NSW | Davey Ray ( (United States) ) | Jerry Coons Jnr (USA) | Adam Clarke (NSW) |
| 2006–07 | Toowoomba Speedbowl | Toowoomba, Qld | Jerry Coons Jnr ( (United States) ) | Mark Brown (NSW) | Dene McAllan (WA) |
| 2007–08 | Perth Motorplex | Perth, WA | Davey Ray ( (United States) ) | Scott Glazebrook (WA) | Rick Geneve (WA) |
| 2008–09 | Riverview Speedway | Murray Bridge | Kevin Swindell ( (United States) ) | Brad Kuhn ( (United States) ) | Neville Lance (WA) |
| 2009–10 | Avalon Raceway | Lara, Vic | Nathan Smee (NSW) | Brendan Palmer (QLD) | Sid Whittaker (QLD) |
| Year | Venue | City/State | Winner | Runner-up | 3rd place |
| 2010–11 | Lismore Speedway | Lismore, NSW | Davey Ray ( (United States) ) | Adam Wallis (Qld) | Michael Pickens ( (New Zealand) ) |
| 2011–12 | Maryborough Speedway | Maryborough, Qld | Not Held (inclement weather) | | |
| 2012–13 | Perth Motorplex | Perth, WA | Neville Lance (WA) | Daryl Clayden (WA) | Casey Shuman ( (United States) ) |
| 2013–14 | Speedway City | Virginia, SA | Adam Clarke (NSW) | Alex Bright ( (United States) ) | Ryan Jones (SA) |
| 2014–15 | Premier Speedway | Warrnambool, VIC | Adam Clarke (NSW) | Nathan Smee (NSW) | Alex Bright ( (United States) ) |
| 2015–16 | Valvoline Raceway | Sydney, NSW | Michael Pickens ( (New Zealand) ) | Andrew Felker ( (United States) ) | Alex Bright ( (United States) ) |
| 2016–17 | Archerfield Speedway | Acacia Ridge, Qld | Rico Abreu ( (United States) (California) ) | Brady Bacon ( (United States) (Oklahoma) ) | Nathan Smee ( (New South Wales) NSW) |
| 2017–18 | Murray Bridge Speedway | Murray Bridge, SA | Kaidon Brown ( (New South Wales) ) | Dayne Kingshott ( (Western Australia) ) | Alex Bright ( (United States) ) |
| 2018–19 | Perth Motorplex | Kwinana Beach, WA | Dayne Kingshott ( (Western Australia) ) | Adam Clarke ( (New South Wales) ) | Jason McDougal ( (United States) ) |
| 2019–20 | Premier Speedway | Warrnambool, VIC | Carson Macedo ( (United States) ) | Alex Bright ( (United States) ) | Kaleb Currie ( (New Zealand) ) |
| 2021–22 | Archerfield Speedway | Acacia Ridge, Qld | Matt Smith ( (New South Wales) ) | Kaidon Brown ( (New South Wales) ) | Travis Mills ( (Victoria (state)) ) |
| 2022–23 | Eastern Creek Speedway | Sydney, NSW | Brady Bacon ( (United States) ) | Kaiden Manders ( (Western Australia) ) | Thomas Meseraull ( (United States) ) |
| 2023–24 | Perth Motorplex | Kwinana Beach, WA | Justin Grant ( (United States) ) | Jade Avedisian ( (United States) ) | Michael Pickens ( (New Zealand) ) |

** The championship was run as a national series between 1963/64 and 1971/72 (with the final round always held at the Sydney Showground), following which it reverted to a single championship meeting.
## 1976–77 and 1979–80 Championships were run over three rounds at three different tracks with a pointscore deciding the winner
♦ 2001–02 Championship was sanctioned by NASR and not Speedcars Australia as previous (and after)

== 1977–78 Controversy ==
The 1977/78 championship at the Brisbane Exhibition Ground remains controversial. In the feature race the field, led by defending champion George Tatnell who had built up almost half a lap lead, was under the yellow caution flags with 8 laps remaining due to a stalled car on the narrow track. With the restart imminent, officials erred by switching to the green light half a lap before the field reached the start line, catching out most of the field, including Tatnell. Local driver Ron Wanless powered past Tatnell and built up a winning lead before the Sydney-based driver could respond. Instead of calling for a restart as they should have, officials unbelievably allowed the race to finish, though Wanless was shown the "racing under protest" flag. Post-race Tatnell immediately protested, as did Adelaide driver Rex Hodgson who was third before the restart but was passed at the early green light by another local driver Danny Davidson. The officials failure to restart the race after the green light error led to conspiracy theories that as it was local Brisbane drivers who benefited (at the time, the local bodies assigned officials to national championship meetings), officials had no intention of admitting they were wrong, thus there was no intention of correcting the problem. There was also a theory that going green early was a common practice at the Exhibition Ground and that knowing the local drivers would be ready for it, the locally supplied officials gave the early green to give them an advantage in an effort to have a home town winner. After numerous protests and votes by committee's, Wanless was eventually awarded the win from Tatnell and Davidson. If any body had bothered to read the ASCC rule book of the day the rule clearly said the race could and would be started after a stoppage when the track was clear which was agreed and affirmed at the drivers meeting before the event began, consequently Wanless was declared the winner by the ASCC (Australian Speedcar Control Council) affirming also that the Chief Steward made the correct decision.

== See also ==
- Motorsport in Australia
