= Midget car racing =

Type of racing using midget cars

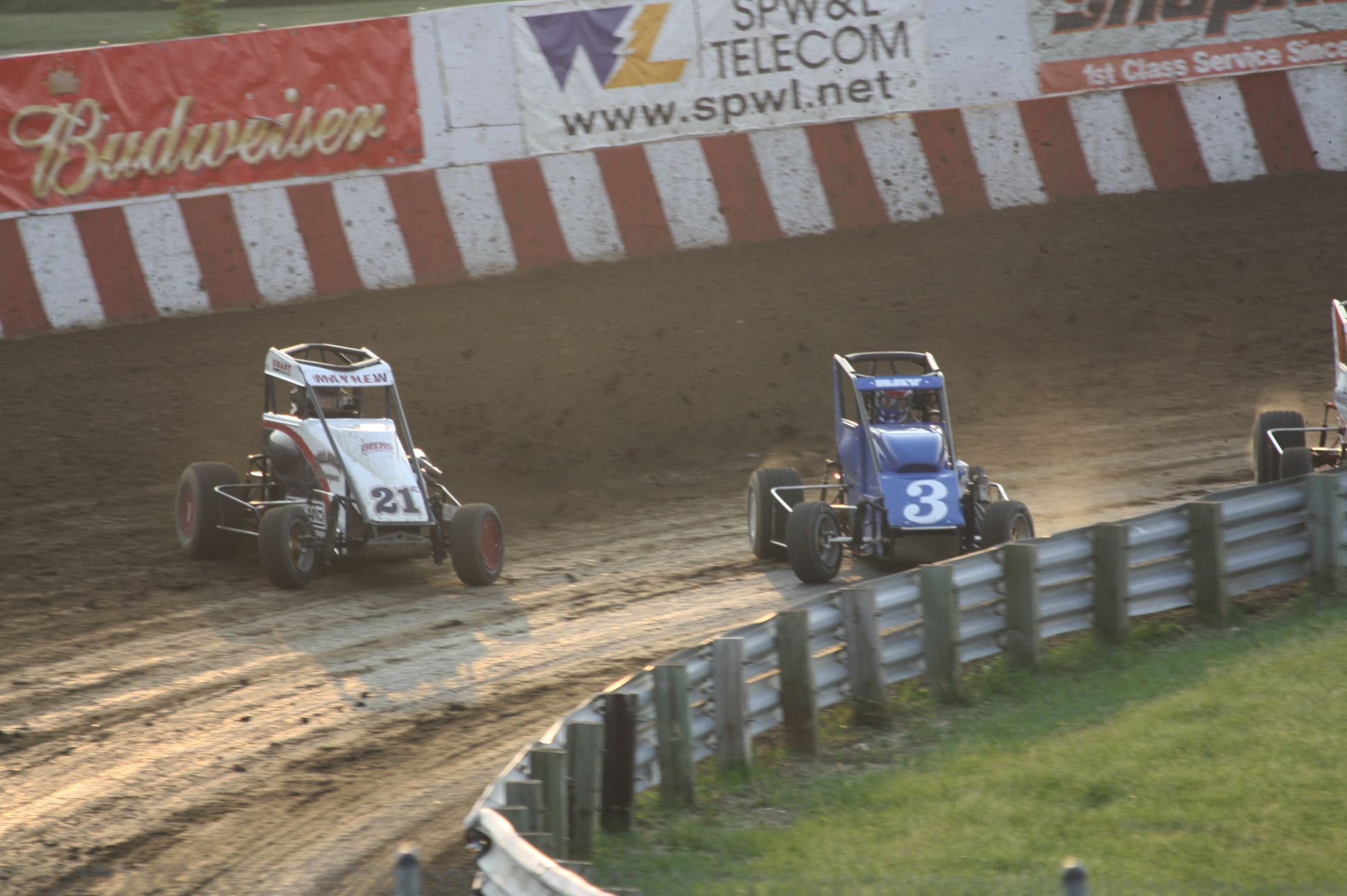
Midget cars racing at Angell Park Speedway in Sun Prairie, Wisconsin

Midget cars, also Speedcars in Australia, is a class of racing cars. The cars are very small, with a very high power-to-weight ratio, and typically use four-cylinder engines. They originated in the United States in the 1930s and are raced on most continents. There is a worldwide tour and national midget tours in the United States, Australia, Argentina and New Zealand.

== Cars ==
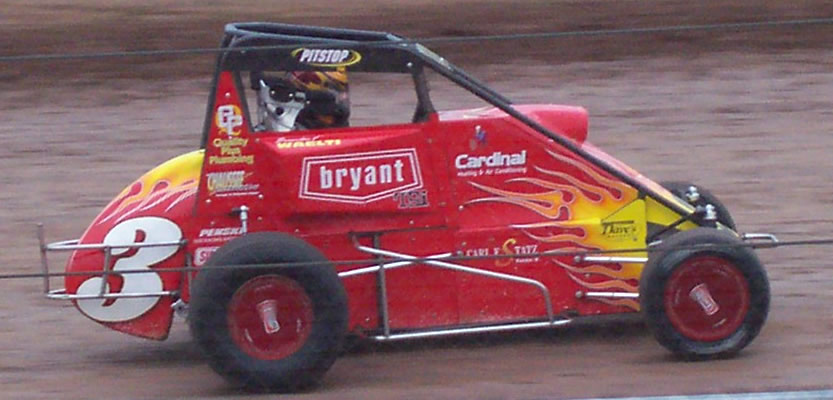
A midget car

Typically, these four-cylinder-engine cars have 300 horsepower (220 kW) to 400 horsepower (300 kW) and weigh 900 pounds (410 kg). The high power and small size of the cars combine to make midget racing quite dangerous; for this reason, modern midget cars are fully equipped with roll cages and other safety features. Some early major midget car manufacturers include Kurtis Kraft (1930s to 1950s) and Solar (1944–46). Midgets are intended to be driven for races of relatively short distances, usually 2.5 to 25 miles (4.0 to 40.2 km). Some events are staged inside arenas, like the Chili Bowl held in early January at the Tulsa Expo Center in Tulsa, Oklahoma. There are midget races in dirt track racing and in asphalt (paved tracks).

There are three-quarter (TQ) midgets which developed from "midget midget" cars of the late 1940s. Quarter midgets are one-quarter the size of a full midget car.

== History ==
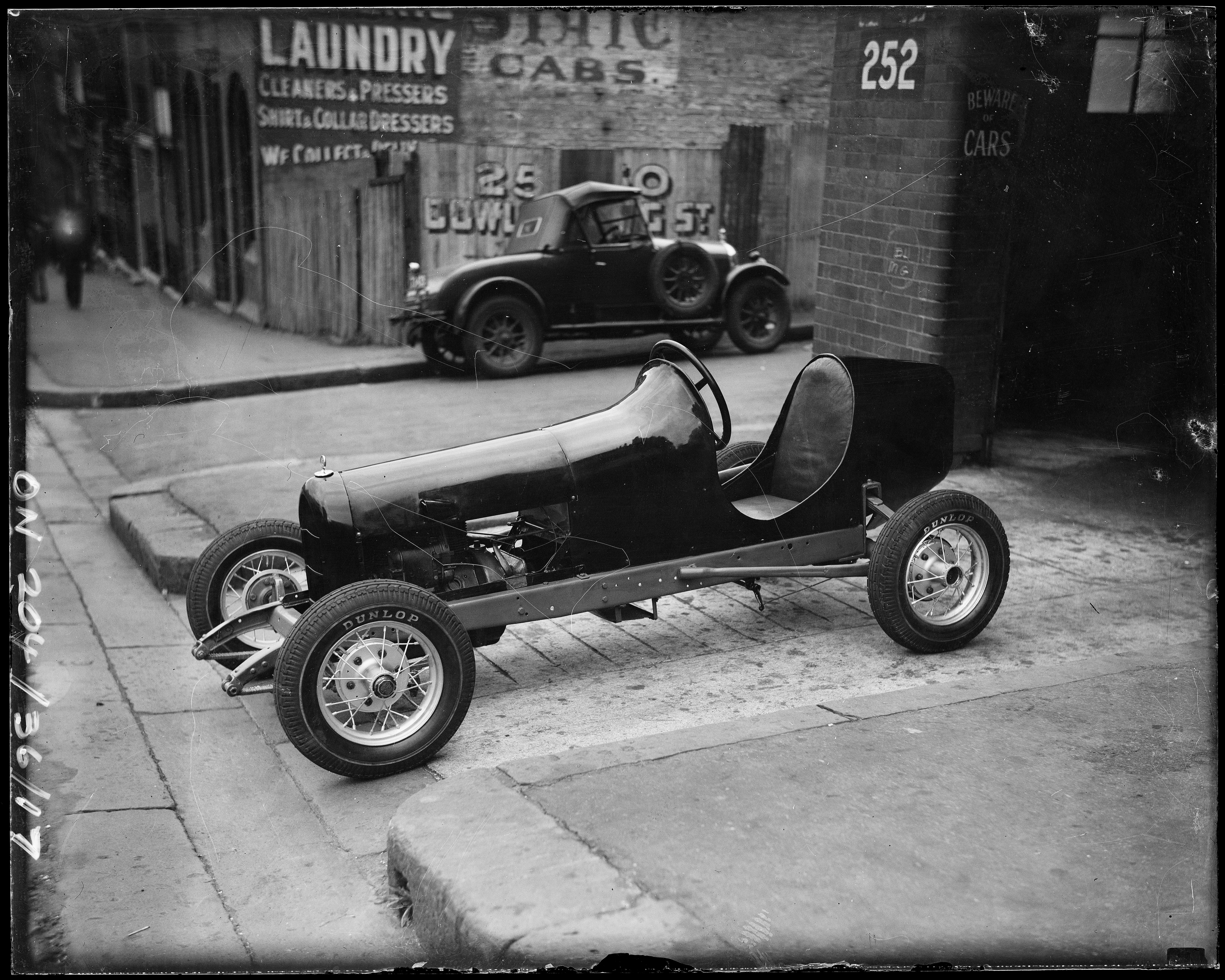
Arch Tuckett's Midget speed car, Sydney, 1934

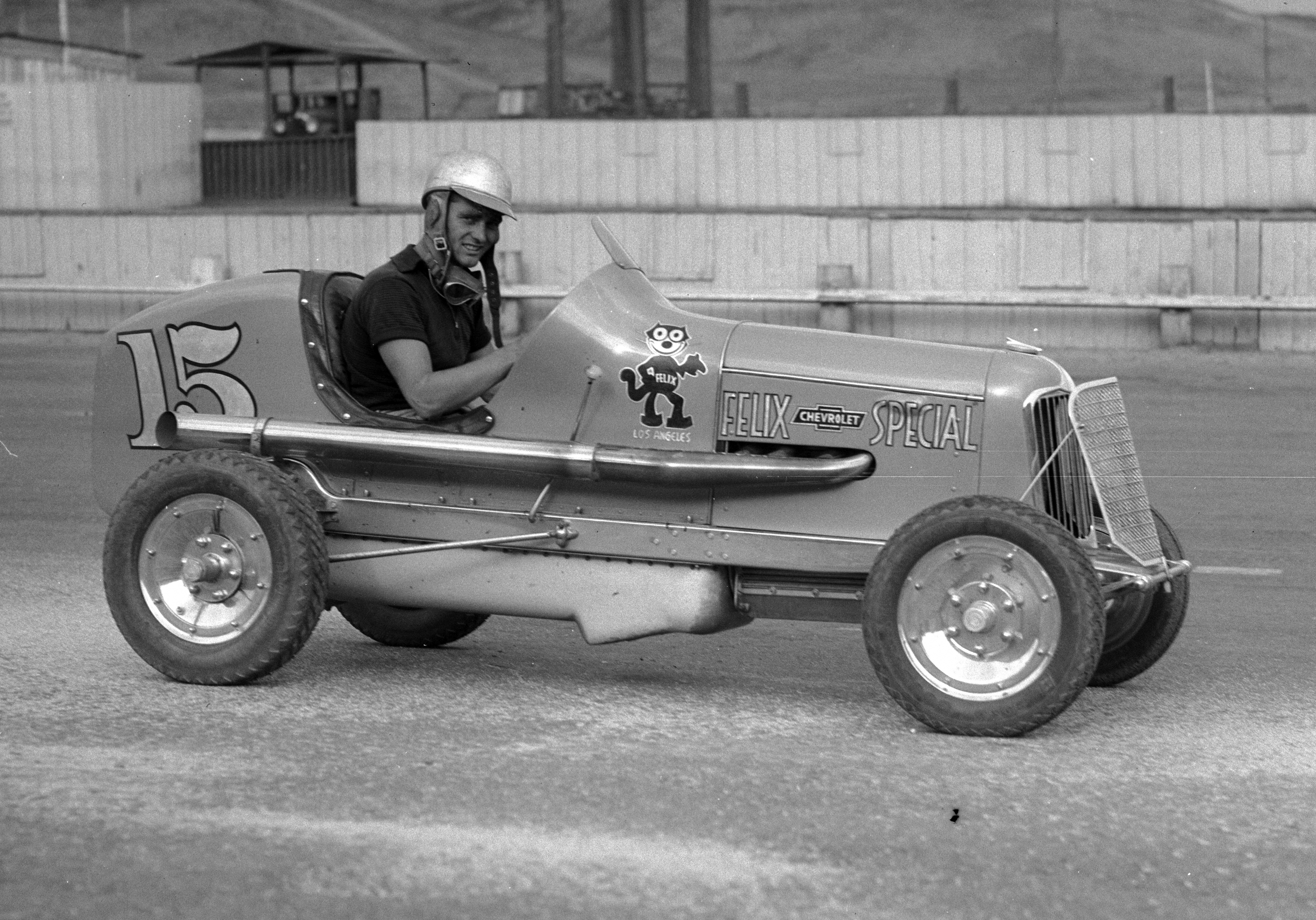
Bob Swanson at the Legion Ascot Speedway in Los Angeles in 1935

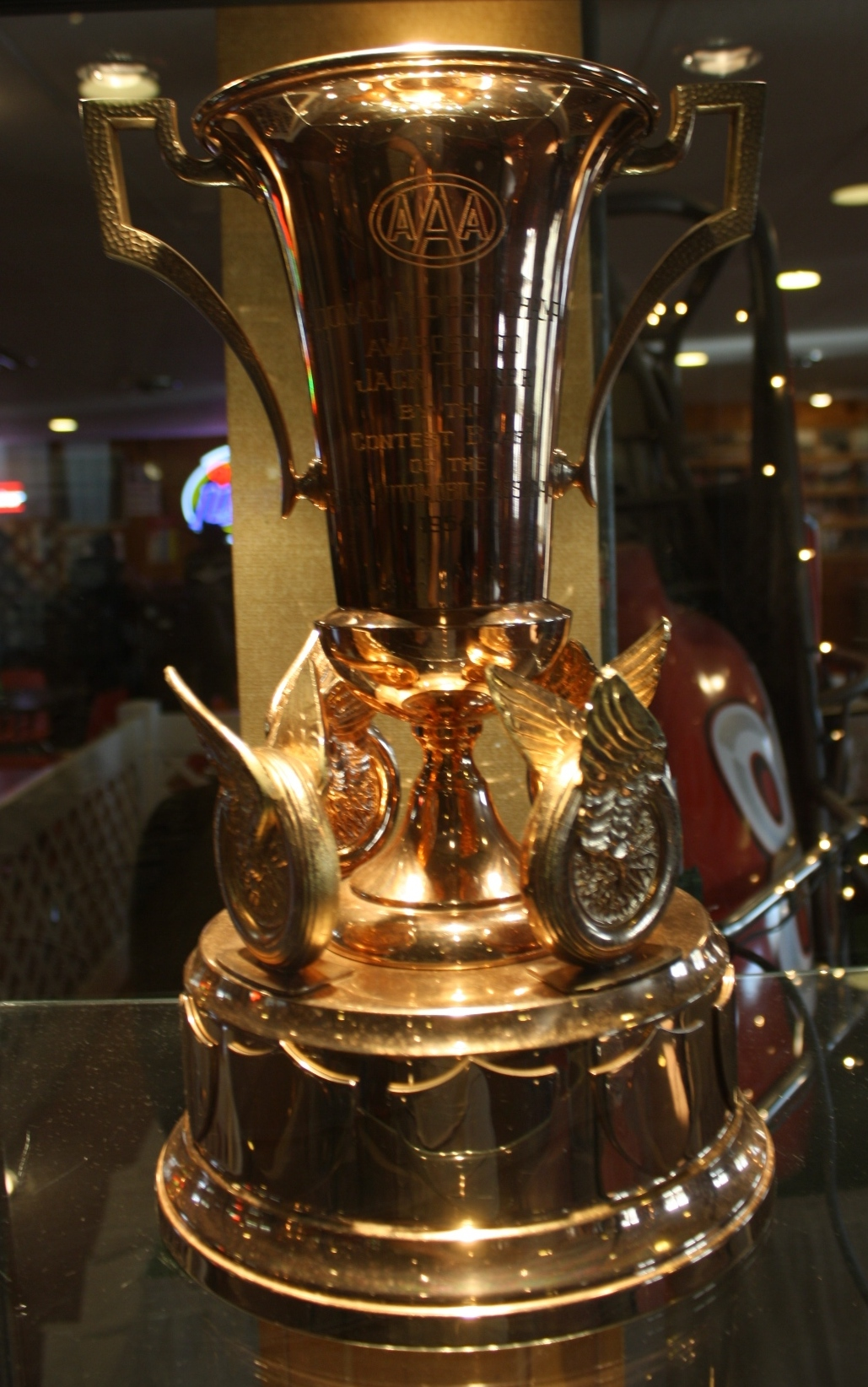
1954 AAA National Midget Championship trophy awarded to Jack Turner

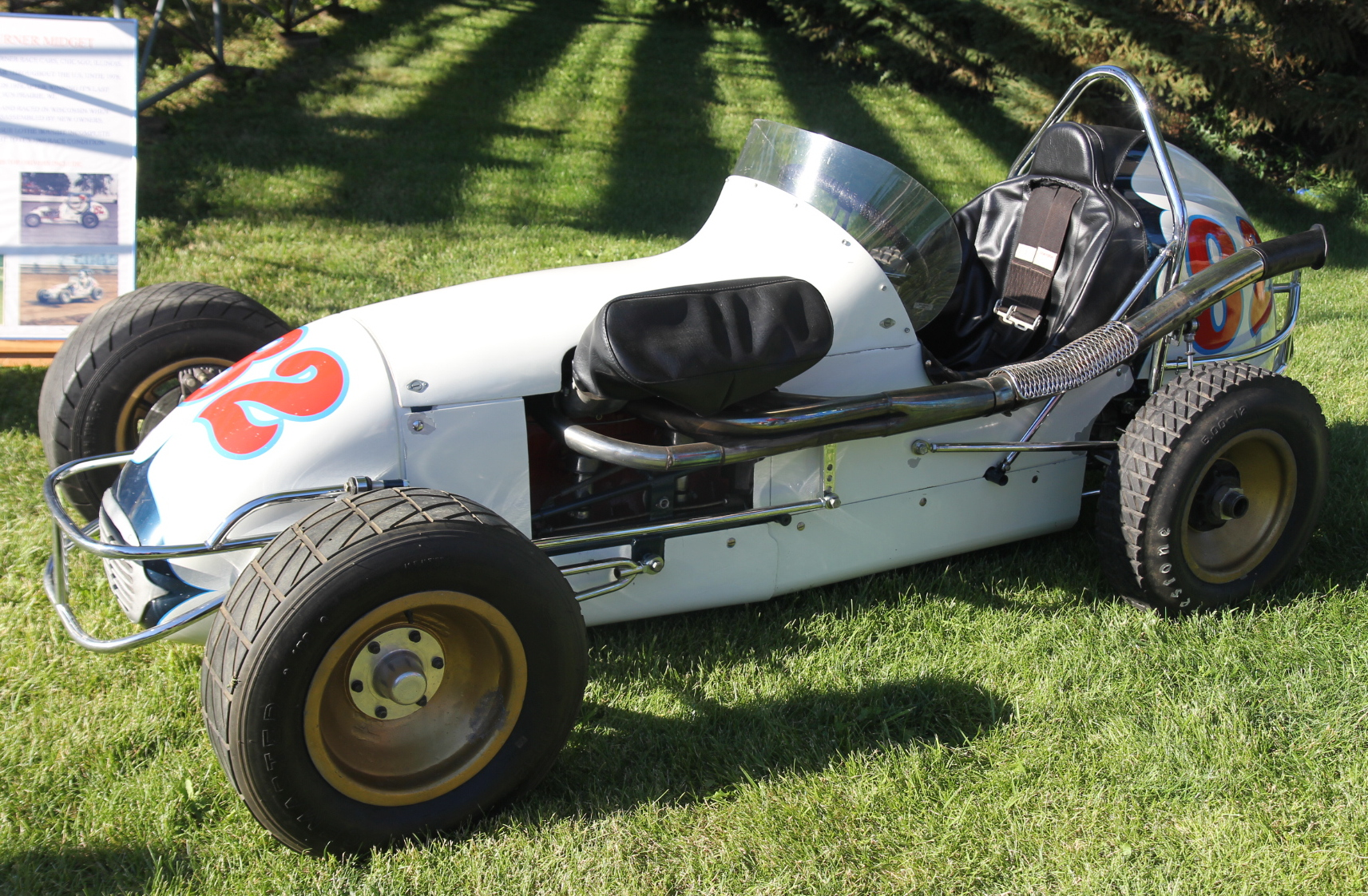
A 1969 Harry Turner midget race car

The first organized Midget car race happened on June 4, 1933. The sports' first regular weekly program began on August 10, 1933 at the Loyola High School Stadium in Los Angeles under the control of the first official governing body, the Midget Auto Racing Association (MARA). After spreading across the country, the sport traveled around the world; first to Australia in 1934 at Melbourne's Olympic Park on December 15, and to New Zealand in 1937. By August 1937, midget cars were racing on a dirt track at Hastings Park in Vancouver, BC, Canada, during the Vancouver Exhibition.

Early midget races were held on board tracks previously used for bicycle racing. When the purpose-built speedway at Gilmore Stadium was completed, racing ended at the school stadium, and hundreds of tracks began to spring up across the United States. Angell Park Speedway in Sun Prairie, Wisconsin (near Madison) is another major track in the United States operating since the first half of the twentieth century.

The AAA Contest Board soon started sanctioning midget races across the country, facing opposition from independent drivers and racetracks. After the AAA withdrew from sanctioning races in 1955, the United States Auto Club took over as the major sanctioning body of midget car racing in the United States. NASCAR had a midget division from 1952 to 1968.

Soon after in Australia, Speedcar racing became popular with the first Australian Speedcar Championship being contested in Melbourne in 1935, its popularity running through the country's "golden era" of the 1950s and 1960s. Australian promoters such as Adelaide's Kym Bonython who ran the Rowley Park Speedway, and Empire Speedways who ran the Brisbane Exhibition Ground and the famous Sydney Showground Speedway, often imported drivers from the US, such as the popular Jimmy Davies. Promoters in Australia during this period often staged races billed as either a "World Speedcar Championship" or "World Speedcar Derby". During this time Speedcars were arguably the most popular category in Australian speedway with crowds of up to 30,000 attending meetings at the Sydney Showground and over 10,000 in Adelaide and Brisbane.

Speedcars continue to race across Australia, with the major events being the annual Australian Speedcar Championship, state championships (held in QLD, NSW, VIC, TAS, SA, WA, and ACT), and blue ribbon events including the Australian Speedcar Grand Prix (first held in 1938), the $20k to win Australasian 50 Lap Speedcar Championship (first held in 1946)(SA), the Sydney 50 Lapper (NSW), Ultimate Speedcar Championship (QLD), the John Day Speedcar Classic (WA), the Beasley Family Memorial (VIC) and more.

In December 2013, POWRi Midget Racing began a 16-event Lucas Oil POWRi Midget World Championship that ran until June 2014. Drivers competed in New Zealand and Australia at the beginning of the 2013–14 season and ended in the United States.

Midget car racing also grew in popularity in the Northeast of the United States, in part due to racers like Bill Schindler and events at tracks like that at Hinchcliffe Stadium.

== Stepping stone to high profile divisions ==
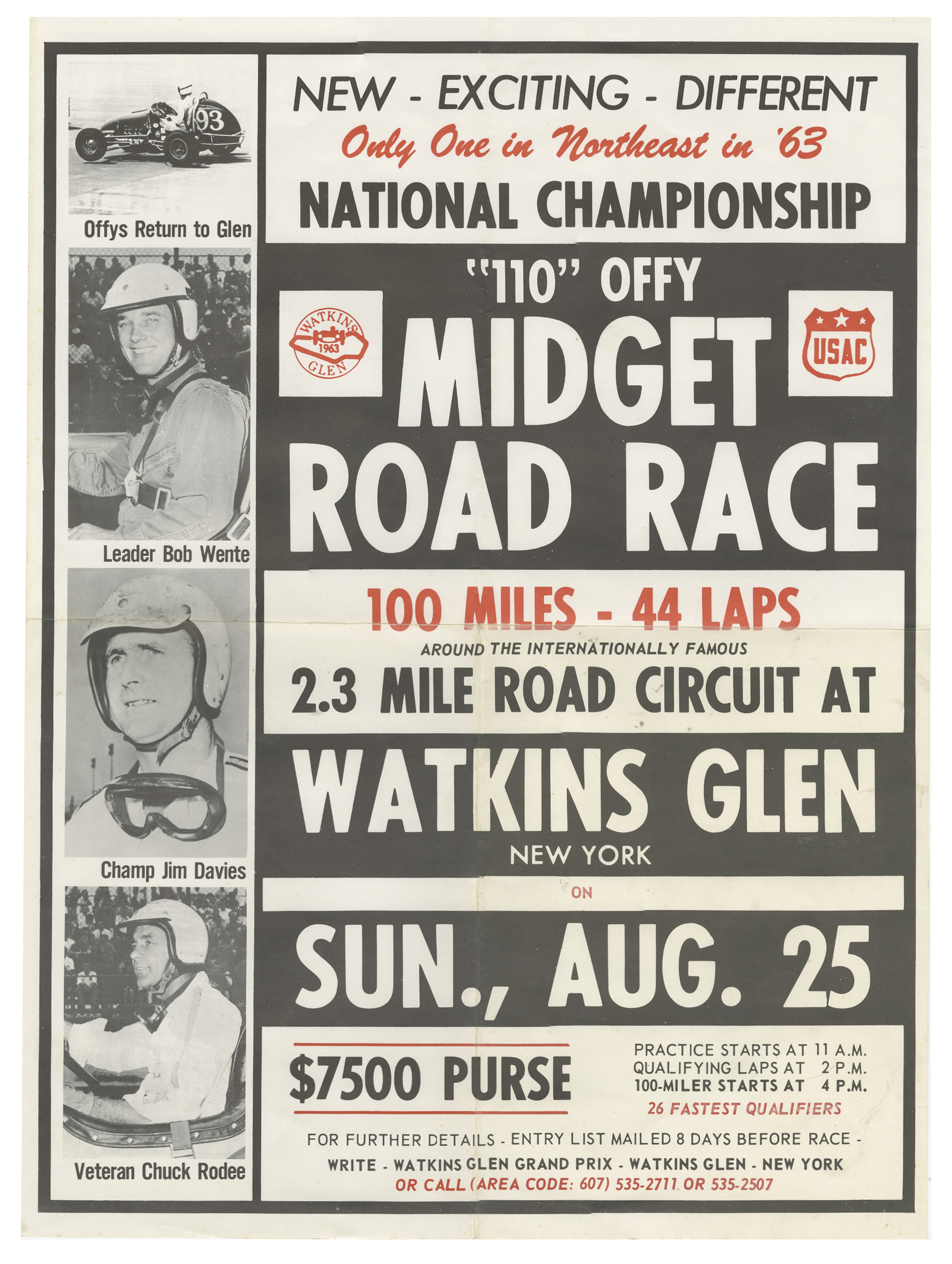
Event poster from a 1963 midget road race held at Watkins Glen; from top to bottom on left: Bob Wente, Jimmy Davies, and Chuck Rodee

Many IndyCar and NASCAR drivers use midget car racing as an intermediate stepping stone on their way to more high-profile divisions, including Tony Stewart, Sarah Fisher, Rodger Ward, A. J. Foyt, Mario Andretti, Johnnie Parsons, Ryan Newman, Kyle Larson, Jeff Gordon, Christopher Bell, Bill Vukovich, and others. Events are sometimes held on weeknights so that popular and famous drivers from other, higher-profiled types of motor racing (who race in those higher-profiled types of racing on the weekends) will be available to compete, and so that it does not conflict with drivers' home tracks.

Australia's Triple Formula One World Drivers' Champion Sir Jack Brabham got his motor racing start in Speedcars on the dirt track ovals in his home town of Sydney. Before going on to become the 1959, 1960 and 1966 World Champion, Brabham was a multiple Australian national and state title winner from 1948 until he turned full time to road racing in 1953.

== Notable midget car races ==
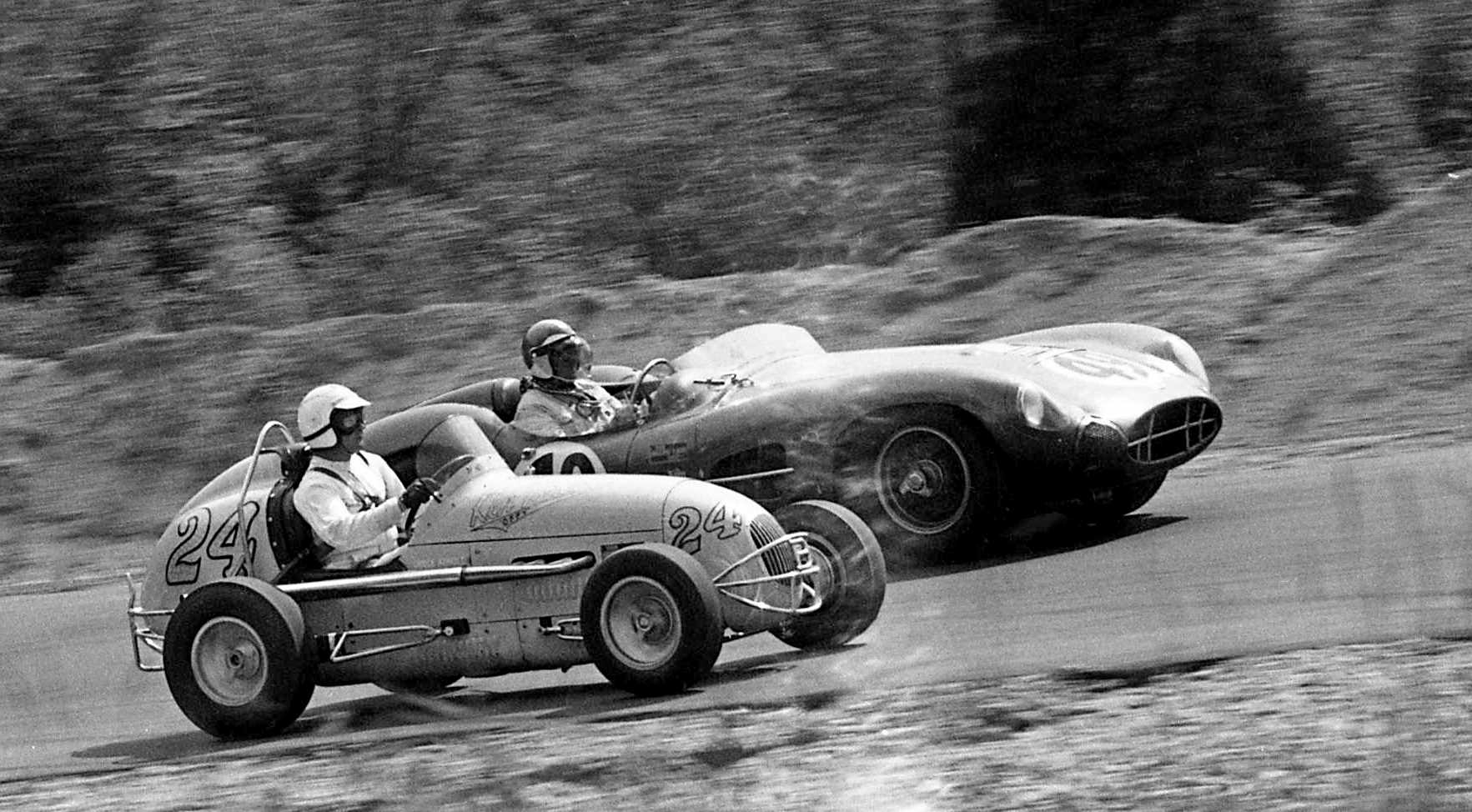
Ward (24) battles George Constantine at Lime Rock Park

In 1959, Lime Rock Park held a famous Formula Libre race, where Rodger Ward shocked the expensive and exotic sports cars by beating them on the road course in an Offenhauser powered midget car, usually used on oval tracks. Ward used an advantageous power-to-weight ratio and dirt-track cornering abilities to steal the win.

=== Notable annual and historic midget car racing events ===
- Chili Bowl – Tulsa Expo Center, Tulsa, Oklahoma
- Fireman Nationals – Angell Park Speedway, Sun Prairie, Wisconsin
- Four Crown Nationals – Eldora Speedway, Allen Township, Darke County, Ohio
- Hut Hundred – Terre Haute Action Track, Terre Haute, Indiana
- Bryan Clauson Classic - Indianapolis Motor Speedway, Speedway, Indiana
- Night before the 500 – O'Reilly Raceway Park, Indianapolis, Indiana
- The Rumble in Fort Wayne – Allen County War Memorial Coliseum Expo Center, Fort Wayne, Indiana
- Turkey Night Grand Prix – Ventura Raceway, Irwindale Speedway
- World 50-lap Classic – Western Springs Stadium, Auckland, New Zealand
- New Zealand Midget Championship – Rotates on various tracks throughout New Zealand
- Australian Speedcar Championship – Rotates on various tracks throughout Australia
- Australian Speedcar Grand Prix – Rotates between tracks throughout eastern Australia
- $20,000 to Win Australasian 50 Lap Speedcar Championship - Murray Bridge Speedway, South Australia
- 50 Lap Speedcar Classic - New South Wales
- John Day Classic – Perth Motorplex Speedway, Kwinana Beach, Western Australia
- Boston Louie Memorial – Seekonk Speedway, Seekonk, Massachusetts
- Bryce Townsend Memorial - Ruapuna Speedway, Christchurch, New Zealand
- Hut Hundred - Terre Haute Action Track, Terre Haute, Indiana (last held 2008)
- Belleville Midget Nationals - Belleville High Banks, Belleville, Kansas (last held 2017)

== Sanctioning bodies ==
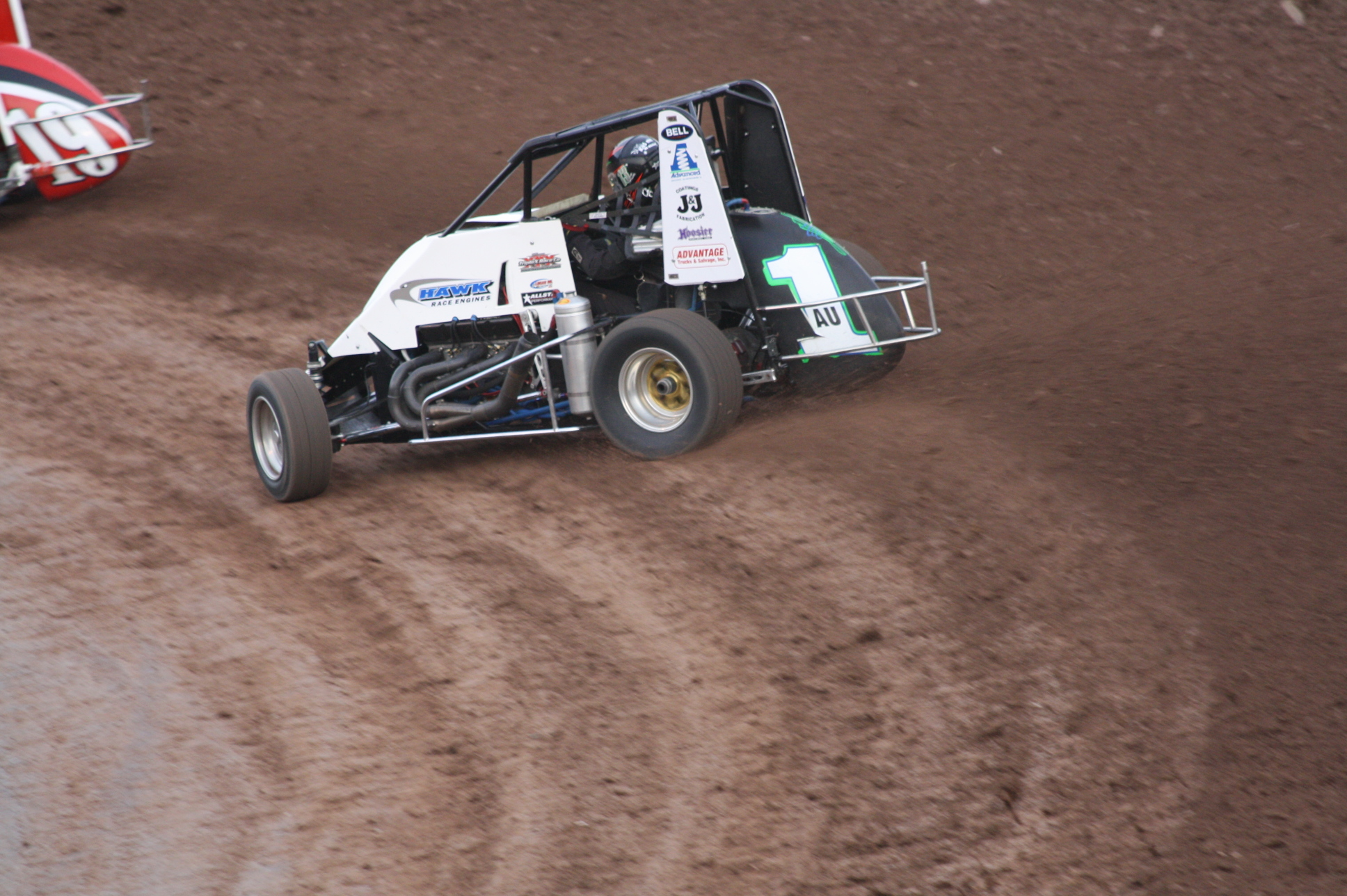
Australian speedcar racer Matt Smith racing his midget car in Beaver Dam, Wisconsin

=== Australia ===
- SpeedcarsAustralia.com – Official website of Australia's Speedcar governing body, Speedcars Australia Inc
- QSRA – Queensland Speedcar Racing Assos. official website
- SAspeedcars.com – South Australian Speedcar Association (covers South Australia & the Northern Territory)
- V.S.D.A – Victorian Speedcar Drivers Association Inc
- wasda.com.au – Western Australian Speedcar Drivers Association (Perth Club)
- Speedcar Association of NSW (Sydney Club)

=== New Zealand ===
- Speedway New Zealand

=== Argentina ===
- Club Midgistas de Sur - Bahía Blanca

=== United Kingdom ===
- Grand Prix Midget Club

=== United States ===
National

- USAC – USAC National Midget Series
- POWRi – POWRi Midget Series

Regional

- BMARA – Badger Midget Auto Racing Association (the oldest sanctioning body)
- POWRi West Lucas Oil Midget Series
- AMRA – Arizona Midget Racing Association
- ARDC – American Racing Drivers Club
- BCRA – Bay Cities Racing Association (co-sanction with POWRi since 2019)
- NEMA – Northeastern Midget Association
- American Three Quarter Midget Racing Association
- STARS– Short Track Auto Racing Series
- RMMRA – Rocky Mountain Midget Racing Association
- SMRS – Southern Midget Racing Series
- IRS – Illini Racing Series
- USSA – United States Speed Association
- WMRA – Washington Midget Racing Association
- SMMS Southern States Midget Series
- Northwest Focus Midget Series

== See also ==
- Australian Speedcar Championship
- Australian Speedcar Grand Prix
- Chili Bowl
- National Midget Auto Racing Hall of Fame
- Shortcar
- SpeedSTR
