= 1965 British League season =

British speedway season

- League: British League
- Season: 1965
- No. of competitors: 18
- Champions: West Ham Hammers
- Knockout Cup: West Ham Hammers
- Individual: Barry Briggs
- London Cup: West Ham Hammers
- Highest average: Nigel Boocock

The 1965 British League season was the 31st season of the top tier of speedway in the United Kingdom. It was also first known as the new British League which was formed in 1965, along with the British Speedway Promoters Association (BSPA). The league was an amalgamation of the National League and the Provincial League.

== Summary ==
Norwich Stars had closed and therefore did not compete and Reg Fearman moved his Middlesbrough promotion to The Shay, which revived the Halifax Dukes who had last competed in the 1951 division 2.

West Ham Hammers were the first ever British League winners. It was their first league success since 1937. The West Ham team included Scot Ken McKinlay who finished the season third with an average of 10.72 and the Norwegian champion Sverre Harrfeldt who finished fifth in the averages. They were supported well by British internationals Norman Hunter and Malcolm Simmons. The West Ham team completed the double winning the British League Knockout Cup. In the final they defeated Exeter Falcons 63–33. The season was not a complete success because during a challenge match at West Ham Stadium a junior rider called David John Wills was killed in a race after a crash. West Ham also won the London Cup but the competition only had three teams competing.

Wimbledon Dons headed by leading Swedish rider Olle Nygren fought West Ham throughout the season and only lost the league by a single point.

== Final table ==
		M	W	D	L	F	A	Pts
1	West Ham Hammers	34	23	1	10	1430	1215	47
2	Wimbledon Dons	34	22	2	10	1396	1245	46
3	Coventry Bees	34	20	0	14	1384	1258	40
4	Oxford Cheetahs	34	19	2	13	1308	1340	40
5	Halifax Dukes	33	18	3	12	1322	1240	39
6	Newport Wasps	34	19	0	15	1360	1288	38
7	Wolverhampton Wolves	34	18	1	15	1429	1216	37
8	Hackney Hawks	34	18	1	15	1327.5	1319.5	37
9	Exeter Falcons	34	18	0	16	1325.5	1323.5	36
10	Poole Pirates	34	17	1	16	1378	1266	35
11	Sheffield Tigers	34	16	2	16	1300	1346	34
12	Newcastle Diamonds	34	16	1	17	1363	1282	33
13	Glasgow Tigers	34	15	1	18	1315	1329	31
14	Belle Vue Aces	34	15	0	19	1328	1312	30
15	Swindon Robins	34	13	2	19	1345	1300	28
16	Cradley Heathens	33	11	1	21	1132	1438	23
17	Edinburgh Monarchs	34	11	0	23	1173	1428	22
18	Long Eaton Archers	34	7	0	27	1107	1534	14

M = Matches; W = Wins; D = Draws; L = Losses; Pts = Total Points

== Fixtures & results ==
Home \ Away	BV	COV	CH	ED	EX	GLA	HAC	HAL	LE	ND	NW	OX	PP	SHE	SWI	WH	WIM	WOL
Belle Vue Aces		44–34	55–23	47–30	43–35	36–42	51–27	45–33	53–25	41–37	55–23	60–18	43–35	55–26	43–35	30–47	44–34	50–28
Coventry Bees	45–31		47–31	58–20	52–26	51–26	42–36	47–30	42–36	45–33	41–36	37–41	47–30	47–30	48–30	39–38	40–38	41–37
Cradley Heathens	42–35	27–51		43–35	42–36	43–35	49–29	n/a	43–35	40–38	35–43	36–42	41–37	39–39	40–38	31–47	29–49	41–37
Edinburgh Monarchs	47–30	31–46	40–38		45–33	36–42	40–38	35–42	38–40	36–41	43–35	47–31	39–38	47–31	40–38	34–44	40–38	42–36
Exeter Falcons	54–24	41–37	51–27	52–26		46–32	54–24	40–38	45–33	44–34	51–27	52–26	42–36	50–28	48–30	46–32	41–37	30–48
Glasgow Tigers	46–32	56–22	53–25	48–30	54–24		59–19	33–44	60–18	42–36	43–35	38–40	49–29	37–41	40–38	46–32	37–41	43–34
Hackney Hawks	48–29	44–34	45–32	50–28	41.5–36.5	54–24		45–33	48–30	59–18	47–31	46–32	43–35	54–24	40–38	40–37	35–43	44–34
Halifax Dukes	50–28	40–38	62–16	48–30	50–27	39–39	44–34		36–41	44–32	42–35	41–36	50–28	43–34	39–39	39–38	39–39	48–30
Long Eaton Archers	41–36	29–49	45–32	52–26	32–44	41–37	38–40	36–41		36–41	32–46	38–39	31–47	37–40	40–37	37–41	34–44	32–45
Newcastle Diamonds	45–33	51–27	42–36	46–32	57–21	48–30	50–28	49–29	50–28		51–27	39–39	41–37	48–30	43–35	46–32	38–40	38–39
Newport Wasps	54–24	47–31	56–22	51–37	45–33	50–28	56–22	46–32	52–26	44–34		44–34	41–37	44–34	41–37	42–36	49–29	41–37
Oxford Cheetahs	41–37	42–36	41–37	48–30	44–34	48–30	42–36	42–36	50–28	40–38	45–32		34–44	41–36	41–37	33–45	38–40	47–31
Poole Pirates	47–29	47–31	52–26	46–32	37–41	49–26	48–30	36–42	59–19	45–33	44–34	42–36		50–28	37–40	51–27	45–33	45–33
Sheffield Tigers	41–37	35–42	40–38	53–25	54–24	42–36	39–39	45–33	53–25	48–30	41–37	47–31	55–23		40–38	37–41	49–29	42–36
Swindon Robins	41–37	45–33	38–40	49–29	46–32	54–24	46–32	38–40	44–34	43–35	48–30	38–40	39–39	52–26		45–33	36–37	42–36
West Ham Hammers	44–34	42–36	40–37	49–29	51–27	47–30	36–42	45–33	60–18	44–34	43–35	43–35	48–30	51–27	48–30		48–30	42–35
Wimbledon Dons	44–32	42–36	52–26	46–30	46–32	49–29	44–34	45–33	63–15	41–36	40–38	39–39	45–33	50–28	41–37	38–40		42–35
Wolverhampton Wolves	51–27	46–32	53–25	44–34	45–33	56–21	44–34	49–29	53–25	47–31	64–14	46–32	38–40	40–38	54–24	39–39	50–28	

Legend: Blue = home team win; Yellow = draw; Red = away team win.

== Top Ten Riders (League Average) ==
	Rider	Nat	Team	C.M.A.
1	Nigel Boocock	(England)	Coventry	11.09
2	Barry Briggs	(New Zealand)	Swindon	10.91
3	Ken McKinlay	(Scotland)	West Ham	10.72
4	Mike Broadbanks	(England)	Swindon	10.54
5	Sverre Harrfeldt	(Norway)	West Ham	10.35
6	Olle Nygren	(Sweden)	Wimbledon	10.31
7	Charlie Monk	(Australia)	Glasgow	10.22
8	Ron How	(England)	Oxford	10.16
9	Arne Pander	(Denmark)	Oxford	10.01
10	Jimmy Gooch	(England)	Oxford	9.97

== Knockout Cup ==
West Ham Hammers won the Knockout Cup and completed the double of league and cup.

== Riders' Championship ==
Barry Briggs won the British League Riders' Championship, held at Hyde Road on 16 October.

Pos.	Rider	Heat Scores	Total
1	(New Zealand) Barry Briggs	3 3 3 2 3	14
2	(England) Jimmy Gooch	2 2 3 3 3	13
3	(England) Cyril Maidment	3 3 3 ef 3	12
4	(Sweden) Olle Nygren	1 3 2 2 3	11
5	(England) Nigel Boocock	1 2 3 3 2	11
6	(Australia) Charlie Monk	2 3 1 2 1	9
7	(New Zealand) Ivan Mauger	3 f 2 1 2	8
8	(England) Pete Jarman	2 1 2 3 ef	8
9	(England) Eric Boocock	2 2 1 1 1	7
10	(England) Colin Gooddy	1 0 1 2 2	6
11	(England) Jack Kitchen	1 1 ef 3 0	5
12	(Scotland) Ken McKinlay	3–2 f -	5
13	(England) Gerry Jackson	0 2 0 0 1	3
14	(England) George Major	0 1 ef 1 1	3
15	(England) Ronnie Genz	0 0 0 ef 2	2
16	(England) Alby Golden	0 1 1 0 0	2
17	(New Zealand) Alf Wells (res)	1 - - - -	1
18	(Wales) Kid Brodie (res)	0 - - - -	0

- ef=engine failure, f=fell, exc=excluded

== Final leading averages ==
	Rider	Nat	Team	C.M.A.
1	Nigel Boocock	(England)	Coventry	11.12
2	Barry Briggs	(New Zealand)	Swindon	10.93
3	Ken McKinlay	(Scotland)	West Ham	10.83
4	Mike Broadbanks	(England)	Swindon	10.48
5	Sverre Harrfeldt	(Norway)	West Ham	10.46
6	Charlie Monk	(Australia)	Glasgow	10.28
7	Olle Nygren	(Sweden)	Wimbledon	10.22
8	Ron How	(England)	Oxford	10.16
9	Arne Pander	(Denmark)	Oxford	10.03
10	Jimmy Gooch	(England)	Oxford	9.90
11	Cyril Maidment	(England)	Belle Vue	9.65
12	Ronnie Genz	(England)	Poole	9.45
13	Eric Boocock	(England)	Halifax	9.43
14	Norman Hunter	(England)	West Ham	9.42
15	George Hunter	(Scotland)	Edinburgh	9.35
16	Ivor Brown	(England)	Cradley Heath	9.27
17	Colin Gooddy	(England)	Exeter	9.24
18	Reg Luckhurst	(England)	Wimbledon	9.14
19	Bill Andrew	(New Zealand)	Poole	9.07
20	Dave Younghusband	(England)	Halifax	9.06

== London Cup ==
Pos	Team	P	W	D	L	F	A	Pts
1	West Ham Hammers	4	2	1	1	196	188	5
2	Hackney Hawks	4	2	0	2	189	194	4
3	Wimbledon Dons	4	1	1	2	190	193	3

Results

Team	Score	Team
Wimbledon	53–43	Hackney
Hackney	52–44	West Ham
West Ham	50–46	Hackney
Hackney	48–47	Wimbledon
Wimbledon	48–48	West Ham
West Ham	54–42	Wimbledon

== Riders & final averages ==
Belle Vue

- (England) Cyril Maidment 9.65
- (England) Dick Fisher 8.06
- (Scotland) Gordon McGregor 7.52
- (Hungary) Sándor Lévai 6.37
- (England) Norman Nevitt 6.03
- (England) Bill Powell 5.50
- (England) Dent Oliver 5.25
- (England) Jim Yacoby 4.12
- (England) Vic White 4.10
- (England) Dave Schofield 1.67

Coventry

- (England) Nigel Boocock 11.12
- (England) Ron Mountford 8.74
- (England) Jim Lightfoot 8.65
- (England) Rick France 6.30
- (England) Col Cottrell 6.00
- (England) Les Owen 4.27
- (England) Chris Harrison 3.08
- (England) Fred Hodder 2.12
- (England) Howie Booton 0.64

Cradley Heath

- (England) Ivor Brown 9.27
- (England) John Hart 7.78
- (England) George Major 7.63
- (England) Eric Hockaday 6.29
- (Wales) Leo McAuliffe 5.87
- (New Zealand) Goog Allan 5.10
- (England) Chris Julian 5.09
- (England) Harry Bastable 4.79
- (England) Tim Bungay 3.35
- (England) John Debbage 3.31
- (Wales) Ivor Hughes 2.89
- (England) Ron Cooper 1.65

Edinburgh

- (Scotland) George Hunter 9.35
- (Scotland) Doug Templeton 7.34
- (New Zealand) Colin McKee 6.61
- (Norway) Henry Harrfeldt 5.42
- (Scotland) Bill Landels 4.94
- (New Zealand) Alf Wells 4.83
- (New Zealand) Wayne Briggs 4.42
- (Scotland) Bert Harkins 4.17
- (Australia) Kevin Torpie 3.88
- (Australia) Ross Nickisson 2.50

Exeter

- (England) Colin Gooddy 9.24
- (England) Jimmy Squibb 7.72
- (Australia) Jack Geran 7.62
- (England) Alan Cowland 7.37
- (Canada) Chris Blewett 6.05
- (England) Tim Bungay 6.00
- (Wales) Ivor Hughes 6.00
- (England) Des Lukehurst 5.78
- (England) Maury McDermott 4.36
- (England) Doug Dearden 3.61

Glasgow

- (Australia) Charlie Monk 10.28
- (Australia) Bluey Scott 7.61
- (Scotland) Willie Templeton 7.16
- (Norway) Nils Paulsen 6.58
- (England) Maury Mattingley 6.12
- (New Zealand) Graham Coombes 5.23
- (Australia) Bruce Ovenden 4.76
- (Scotland) Bill McMillan 4.12

Hackney

- (England) Gerry Jackson 8.69
- (England) Colin Pratt 8.51
- (England) Roy Trigg 7.51
- (England) John Poyser 6.79
- (England) Les McGillivray 6.60
- (England) Howdy Byford 5.49
- (England) Malcolm Brown 5.15
- (England) Brian Davies 5.04
- (England) Sandy McGillivray 3.45

Halifax

- (England) Eric Boocock 9.43
- (England) Dave Younghusband 9.06
- (England) Eric Boothroyd 8.00
- (England) Tommy Roper 7.29
- (England) Bryan Elliott 6.30
- (Australia) Dennis Gavros 4.91
- (Australia) Bert Kingston 4.07
- (England) Ray Day 4.00
- (England) Clive Hitch 3.75
- (Australia) Bob Jameson 2.93

Long Eaton

- (Australia) Ray Cresp 7.96
- (Wales) Howard Cole (Kid Bodie) 6.84
- (England) Norman Storer 6.64
- (England) Ray Wilson 6.55
- (England) Ken Adams 5.19
- (England) Clive Hitch 5.08
- (England) John Mills 4.77
- (England) Paul Sharples 3.45
- (New Zealand) Rim Malskaitis 2.61

Newcastle

- (New Zealand) Ivan Mauger 8.76
- (England) Brian Brett 8.75
- (England) Peter Kelly 7.35
- (England) Brian Craven 7.30
- (England) Mike Watkin 6.23
- (England) Russ Dent 5.92
- (England) Ken Sharples 5.77
- (New Zealand) Goog Allan 5.44
- (New Zealand) Dave Gifford 2.92

Newport

- (Australia) Jack Biggs 9.00
- (England) Dick Bradley 7.90
- (Netherlands) Peter Vandenberg 7.78
- (England) Alby Golden 7.74
- (England) Geoff Penniket 5.88
- (England) Jon Erskine 5.77
- (England) Vic White 5.41
- (Wales) Bob Hughes 4.88

Oxford

- (England) Ron How 10.16
- (Denmark) Arne Pander 10.03
- (England) Jimmy Gooch 9.90
- (England) Maury McDermott 4.53
- (England) Ken Vale 4.51
- (England) John Bishop 4.34
- (England) Eddie Reeves 4.25
- (England) Jimmy Heard 3.83
- (England) Stan Stevens 3.32
- (England) Glyn Chandler 2.45
- (England) John Hook 1.71

Poole

- (England) Ronnie Genz 9.45
- (New Zealand) Bill Andrew 9.07
- (Scotland) Ross Gilbertson 7.76
- (Australia) Geoff Mudge 7.43
- (England) Norman Strachan 6.14
- (England) Pete Smith 5.52
- (England) Pete Munday 3.23
- (New Zealand) Bruce Cribb 3.04
- (England) Pete Swain 0.61

Sheffield

- (England) Jack Kitchen 8.69
- (England) Clive Featherby 8.06
- (England) Billy Bales 7.43
- (England) John Dews 6.05
- (England) David Crane 5.63
- (England) Alan Jay 5.08
- (England) Bob Paulson 4.54

Swindon

- (New Zealand) Barry Briggs 10.93
- (England) Mike Broadbank 10.48
- (England) Martin Ashby 8.83
- (England) Roy Bowers 4.29
- (England) Bob Kilby 4.00
- (England) Mike Keen 3.93
- (England) Pete Sampson 3.24
- (England) Alan Jackson 2.00
- (New Zealand) Frank Shuter 1.47

West Ham

- (Scotland) Ken McKinlay 10.83
- (Norway) Sverre Harrfeldt 10.46
- (England) Norman Hunter 9.42
- (England) Malcolm Simmons 6.56
- (England) Reg Trott 4.65
- (England) Tony Clarke 4.48
- (England) Brian Leonard 3.65
- (England) Ted Ede 2.80
- (England) Ray Wickett 2.40

Wimbledon

- (Sweden) Olle Nygren 10.22
- (England) Reg Luckhurst 9.14
- (England) Trevor Hedge 8.55
- (England) Bob Dugard 6.77
- (England) Jim Tebby 6.01
- (England) John Edwards 4.91
- (England) Mike Coomber 2.60
- (England) Geoff Hughes 1.44

Wolverhampton

- (England) Pete Jarman 8.70
- (England) Bob Andrews 8.33
- (Australia) Jim Airey 8.19
- (England) Tommy Sweetman 7.39
- (Wales) Cyril Francis 7.20
- (Australia) Gordon Guasco 6.98
- (England) Brian Maxted 5.64
- (England) James Bond 4.62

== See also ==
- List of United Kingdom Speedway League Champions
- Knockout Cup (speedway)
