= 1966 British League season =

British speedway season

- League: British League
- Season: 1966
- No. of competitors: 19
- Champions: Halifax Dukes
- Knockout Cup: Halifax Dukes
- Individual: Barry Briggs
- London Cup: West Ham Hammers
- Midland Cup: Coventry Bees
- Northern Cup: Halifax Dukes
- Highest average: Barry Briggs

The 1966 British League season was the 32nd season of the top tier of speedway in the United Kingdom and the second season known as the British League. Halifax Dukes won the league and then secured the league and cup double.

== Summary ==
The League expanded to 19, with a new team, the King's Lynn Stars. Halifax Dukes won the league after 36 games and finished three points clear of Coventry Bees. The Halifax team success was due to the consistency of their riders, in particular Eric Boocock, Eric Boothroyd, Dave Younghusband and Tommy Roper who all scored heavily throughout the season. Halifax also completed the double winning the British League Knockout Cup. In the final, they easily beat Wimbledon Dons.

The four times world champion Barry Briggs topped the averages for Swindon Robins during the same season in which he sealed his fourth world title. The dangers of speedway were highlighted once again however when Welshman Ivor Hughes was killed during the league match riding for Cradley Heath Heathens against Sheffield Tigers on 20 August.

Coventry won the Midland Cup, West Ham the London Cup and Halifax Dukes the Northern Cup.

== Final table ==
		M	W	D	L	F	A	Pts
1	Halifax Dukes	36	27	0	9	1574	1229	54
2	Coventry Bees	36	25	1	10	1548	1255	51
3	Swindon Robins	36	23	0	13	1553	1248	46
4	Wimbledon Dons	36	22	0	14	1485	1314	44
5	Newcastle Diamonds	36	20	0	16	1491.5	1304.5	40
6	Poole Pirates	36	19	2	15	1443	1356	40
7	West Ham Hammers	36	19	1	10	1499.5	1304.5	39
8	Glasgow Tigers	36	18	0	18	1395	1394	36
9	Wolverhampton Wolves	36	17	2	17	1340.5	1461.5	36
10	Exeter Falcons	36	17	1	18	1392.5	1403.5	35
11	Sheffield Tigers	36	17	0	19	1410	1394	34
12	Edinburgh Monarchs	35	17	0	18	1310.5	1413.5	34
13	Belle Vue Aces	36	16	0	20	1362	1443	32
14	Hackney Hawks	36	15	1	20	1347.5	1456.5	31
15	Oxford Cheetahs	36	14	2	20	1291	1510	30
16	King's Lynn Stars	36	15	0	21	1275	1524	30
17	Newport Wasps	36	12	1	23	1319	1486	25
18	Long Eaton Archers	36	12	1	23	1286	1516	25
19	Cradley Heath Heathens	35	10	0	25	1196	1506	20

M = Matches; W = Wins; D = Draws; L = Losses; Pts = Total Points

== Fixtures & results ==
Home \ Away	BV	COV	CH	ED	EX	GLA	HAC	HAL	KL	LE	ND	NW	OX	PP	SHE	SWI	WH	WIM	WOL
Belle Vue Aces		44–34	43–35	43–35	55–23	42–36	49–29	34–44	47–31	51–27	41–37	53–24	51–27	35–43	43–35	43–35	50–28	40–38	53–25
Coventry Bees	46–32		50–28	49–29	53–25	42–36	46–32	52–25	53–25	48–30	45–33	55–23	47–31	44–34	53–25	54–24	42–36	42–36	45–33
Cradley Heathens	48–30	28–50		n/a	33–39	41–37	45–33	27–51	34–43	42–36	44–34	41–37	46–31	31–47	46–32	39–38	33–44	37–41	44–34
Edinburgh Monarchs	42–35	44–34	49–29		42–36	46–31	43–35	37–41	51–27	50–28	50–28	47–31	43–35	42–36	45–33	45–33	42–36	43–35	35.5–42.5
Exeter Falcons	48–30	39–39	49–29	37–41		46–32	45–32	36–41	50–28	42–36	45–33	47–31	53–25	44–33	43–35	48–30	41–37	46–30	51–27
Glasgow Tigers	54–24	41–37	36–29	43–35	45–32		52–26	42–36	53–25	50–28	45–33	46–32	45–33	60–17	42–35	38–40	39–38	48–29	40–38
Hackney Hawks	41–37	38–40	44–34	46–32	43–35	41–37		37–41	42–36	51–27	40–38	43–35	42–36	42.5–34.5	47–31	41–37	39–39	36–42	46–32
Halifax Dukes	52–26	45–33	51–27	54–24	43–35	60–18	44–34		53–25	50–28	38–40	57–21	55–23	41–37	52–26	42–36	41–37	46–32	53–25
King's Lynn Stars	40–38	41–36	40–38	43–32	41–37	45–33	41–37	42–36		43–35	48–29	49–29	37–40	37–41	41–37	33–45	43–35	35–43	47–31
Long Eaton Archers	40–38	37–41	50–27	48–29	48–30	48–30	41–37	35–42	44–33		42–36	43–35	50–28	41–37	40–38	38–39	43–35	34–44	39–39
Newcastle Diamonds	57–21	38–39	53–25	54–24	46.5–31.5	52–26	48–30	43–35	50–28	53–25		45–32	48–30	48–30	41–36	40–38	44–34	47–30	50–28
Newport Wasps	53–25	34–44	45–33	43–35	38–40	38–40	47–31	36–42	43–35	57–21	40–38		44–34	39–39	54–24	44–34	42–36	43–35	43–35
Oxford Cheetahs	40–37	36–42	50–27	42–36	42–36	40–38	50–27	35–42	42–36	51–27	42–36	40–38		39–39	40–38	40–38	35–43	40–37	39–39
Poole Pirates	48–30	49–29	42–35	56–22	48–30	48–30	41–36	40–38	54–23	45–33	35–42	41–37	51–27		55–23	38–40	42.5–35.5	49–28	40–38
Sheffield Tigers	50–28	42–36	54–24	56–22	47–31	49–29	47–31	34–44	55–23	47–31	41–36	58–20	44–34	55–23		40–38	40–38	41–37	48–30
Swindon Robins	53–25	45–33	54–24	52–26	52–26	53–25	46–32	49–29	53–25	44–34	42–33	52–25	60–18	45–33	45–33		45–33	43–35	58–20
West Ham Hammers	44–34	36–42	48–29	50–28	50–28	43–35	45–33	37–41	51–27	52–26	48–30	48–30	51–27	43–35	54–24	41–37		36–42	53–25
Wimbledon Dons	48–30	44–34	45–32	52–26	44–34	48–30	45–33	46–32	56–22	51–27	47–31	46–32	43–35	44–33	49–28	36–42	40–38		51–27
Wolverhampton Wolves	53–25	42–34	46–32	40–38	44–34	45–33	38–40	40–37	41–37	41–37	39–38	45–33	44–34	49–29	49–29	39–38	36–42	42–36	

Legend: Blue = home team win; Yellow = draw; Red = away team win.

== Top ten riders (league averages) ==
	Rider	Nat	Team	C.M.A.
1	Barry Briggs	(New Zealand)	Swindon	11.08
2	Nigel Boocock	(England)	Coventry	10.67
3	Gote Nordin	(Sweden)	Newport	10.53
4	Eric Boocock	(England)	Halifax	10.41
5	Olle Nygren	(Sweden)	Wimbledon	10.32
6	Colin Pratt	(England)	Hackney	9.93
7	Ken McKinlay	(Scotland)	West Ham	9.78
8	Mike Broadbank	(England)	Swindon	9.77
9	Sverre Harrfeldt	(Norway)	West Ham	9.76
10	Trevor Hedge	(England)	Wimbledon	9.64

== Knockout Cup ==
Halifax Dukes won the Knockout Cup and therefore secured the league and cup double.

== Riders' Championship ==
Barry Briggs won the British League Riders' Championship for the second consecutive year, held at Hyde Road on 22 October.

Pos.	Rider	Heat Scores	Total
1	(New Zealand) Barry Briggs	3 3 3 3 3	15
2	(Sweden) Olle Nygren	2 3 3 3 3	14
3	(England) Norman Hunter	3 2 3 2 2	12
4	(New Zealand) Ivan Mauger	3 2 0 3 3	11
5	(England) Ray Wilson	3 3 2 2 exc	10
6	(England) Nigel Boocock	1 3 1 3 -	8
7	(Scotland) George Hunter	0 1 1 2 3	7
8	(New Zealand) Bill Andrew	0 ef 3 1 2	6
9	(England) Jimmy Gooch	1 1 2 1 1	6
10	(Australia) Peter Vandenberg	1 1 ef 1 2	5
11	(England) Terry Betts	2 1 2 ef ef	5
12	(Australia) Charlie Monk	2 F 2 1 ef	5
13	(England) Cyril Maidment	0 2 1 2 ef	5
14	(England) Tommy Sweetman	2 0 ef 0 2	4
15	(England) Eric Boocock	1 2 ef ef ef	3
16	(England) Colin Pratt	0 0 1 0 1	2

- ef=engine failure, f=fell, exc=excluded

== London Cup ==
West Ham successfully defended their London Cup title but once again there were just three teams competing.

Pos	Team	P	W	D	L	F	A	Pts
1	West Ham Hammers	4	3	0	1	216	168	6
2	Wimbledon Dons	4	3	0	1	192.5	191.5	6
3	Hackney Hawks	4	0	0	4	167.5	216.5	0

Home \ Away	HAC	WH	WIM
Hackney		43–53	47.5–48.5
West Ham	63–33		53–42
Wimbledon	52–44	49–47	

Legend: Blue = home team win; Yellow = draw; Red = away team win.

== Midland Cup ==
Coventry won the Midland Cup, which consisted of six teams.

Midland Cup (group 1)

		M	W	D	L	Pts
1	Wolverhampton	4	3	0	1	6
2	Swindon	4	2	0	2	4
3	Cradley Heath	4	1	0	3	2

Midland Cup (group 2)

		M	W	D	L	Pts
1	Coventry	4	3	0	1	6
2	Oxford	4	3	0	1	6
3	Long Eaton	4	0	0	4	0

Home \ Away	CH	SWI	WOL
Cradley		40–38	37–41
Swindon	61–17		52–26
Wolverhampton	44–34	43–35	

Legend: Blue = home team win; Yellow = draw; Red = away team win.

Home \ Away	COV	LE	OX
Coventry		47–31	45–33
Long Eaton	37–41		32–46
Oxford	40–37	50–28	

Legend: Blue = home team win; Yellow = draw; Red = away team win.

Final

First leg

16 September 1966

Wolverhampton Peter Vandenberg 10 Gordon Guasco 9 Cyril Francis 7 Brian Maxted 6 Alan Cowland 5 Dave Hemus 2 Pete Jarman 1	39–39	Coventry Nigel Boocock 14 Rick France 13 Col Cottrell 5 Jim Lightfoot 5 Roger Hill 1 Chris Harrison 1 Tom Ridley 0 Ron Mountford r/r

Monmore Green Stadium

Second leg

19 September 1966

Coventry Col Cottrell 12 Jim Lightfoot 12 Rick France 9 Nigel Boocock 8 Les Owen 6 Roger Hill 2 Chris Harrison 0 Ron Mountford r/r	49–29	Wolverhampton Gordon Guasco 8 Brian Maxted 6 Peter Vandenberg 5 Dave Hemus 4 Cyril Francis 4 Alan Cowland 2 Pete Jarman 0

Brandon Stadium

Coventry won on aggregate 88–68

== Northern Cup ==
- Due to the late entry of Edinburgh and Glasgow, several British league results doubled for the Northern Cup.

		M	W	L	Pts	BP	Total
1	Halifax	10	7	3	7	5	12
2	Sheffield	10	6	4	6	3	9
3	Newcastle	10	5	5	5	3.5	8.5
4	Glasgow	9	5	4	5	0	5
5	Edinburgh	9	3	6	4	1	4
5	Middlesbrough	8	2	6	2	0.5	2.5

Home \ Away	ED	GLA	HAL	MID	NEW	SHE
Edinburgh		46–31	37–41	N/H	50–28	45–33
Glasgow	43–35		42–36	N/H	45–33	42–35
Halifax	54–24	60–18		43–35	45–33	54–24
Middlesbrough	49–29	32–45	32–46		46–32	36–42
Newcastle	54–24	52–26	44–33	46–32		45–32
Sheffield	56–22	49–29	43–35	46–31	39–38	

Legend: Blue = home team win; Yellow = draw; Red = away team win.

== Final leading averages ==
	Rider	Nat	Team	C.M.A.
1	Barry Briggs	(New Zealand)	Swindon	11.12
2	Nigel Boocock	(England)	Coventry	10.54
3	Eric Boocock	(England)	Halifax	10.46
4	Göte Nordin	(Sweden)	Newport	10.44
5	Olle Nygren	(Sweden)	Wimbledon	10.40
6	Colin Pratt	(England)	Hackney	10.00
7	Sverre Harrfeldt	(Norway)	West Ham	9.89
8	Ivan Mauger	(New Zealand)	Newcastle	9.82
9	Ken McKinlay	(Scotland)	West Ham	9.67
10	Mike Broadbank	(England)	Swindon	9.60
11	Trevor Hedge	(England)	Wimbledon	9.39
12	Cyril Maidment	(England)	Belle Vue	9.55
13	Arne Pander	(Denmark)	Oxford	9.53
14	Norman Hunter	(England)	West Ham	9.42
15	Terry Betts	(England)	King's Lynn	9.41
16	Trevor Hedge	(England)	Wimbledon	9.39
17	Eric Boothroyd	(England)	Halifax	9.29
18	Ron Mountford	(England)	Coventry	9.29
19	Charlie Monk	(Australia)	Glasgow	9.27
20	Rick France	(England)	Coventry	9.22

== Riders and final averages ==
Belle Vue

- (England) Cyril Maidment 9.55
- (Hungary) Sándor Lévai 7.79
- (England) Dick Fisher 7.54
- (England) Norman Nevitt 5.86
- (Scotland) Gordon McGregor 5.35
- (England) Bill Powell 5.01
- (England) Jim Yacoby 4.27
- (Wales) Taffy Owen 0.36

Coventry

- (England) Nigel Boocock 10.54
- (England) Ron Mountford 9.29
- (England) Rick France 9.22
- (England) Jim Lightfoot 8.81
- (England) Col Cottrell 5.52
- (England) Les Owen 4.31
- (England) Chris Harrison 3.06
- (England) Roger Hill 2.74
- (England) Tom Ridley 2.12

Cradley Heath

- (England) Ivor Brown 7.88
- (England) Chris Julian 6.51
- (Australia) Chum Taylor 6.32
- (England) Clive Featherby 6.10
- (Wales) Ivor Hughes 5.65
- (Wales) Howard Cole (Kid Brodie) 5.48
- (England) Eric Hockaday 3.64
- (England) Ron Cooper 3.58
- (Austria) Joe Weichlbauer 2.40
- (England) Matt Mattocks 2.33
- (England) Ken Wakefield 2.00

Edinburgh

- (Scotland) George Hunter 8.17
- (Sweden) Bengt Jansson 7.65
- (Scotland) Doug Templeton 7.42
- (Norway) Reidar Eide 5.83
- (Australia) Dudley McKean 5.27
- (Scotland) Bill Landels 5.20
- (Scotland) Bert Harkins 4.81
- (Scotland) Jimmy Tannock 4.55

Exeter

- (England) Tommy Sweetman 9.11
- (Australia) Neil Street 8.23
- (England) Colin Gooddy 7.32
- (England) Jimmy Squibb 6.61
- (Australia) Jack Geran 6.23
- (Canada) Chris Blewett 5.37
- (Poland) Ted Laessing 4.80
- (England) Alan Smith 4.77
- (England) Doug Dearden 2.40

Glasgow

- (Australia) Charlie Monk 9.27
- (New Zealand) Alf Wells 7.47
- (Australia) Bluey Scott 7.06
- (Scotland) Willie Templeton 6.75
- (England) Maury Mattingley 6.35
- (Norway) Jonny Faafeng 5.30
- (Scotland) Bill McMillan 4.95
- (Scotland) Jimmy McMillan 3.54

Hackney

- (England) Colin Pratt 10.00
- (England) Roy Trigg 8.63
- (England) Gerry Jackson 6.81
- (England) Les McGillivray 5.40
- (England) Brian Davies 5.25
- (England) Malcolm Brown 4.58
- (England) Ernie Baker 3.44
- (England) Sandy McGillivray 2.86
- (England) John Poyser 2.00

Halifax

- (England) Eric Boocock 10.46
- (England) Eric Boothroyd 9.29
- (England) Dave Younghusband 8.82
- (England) Tommy Roper 7.54
- (Australia) Bert Kingston 6.00
- (Australia) Bob Jameson 5.38
- (Australia) Dennis Gavros 4.98
- (Australia) Greg Kentwell 4.00
- (England) Maury Robinson 2.33

King's Lynn

- (England) Terry Betts 9.41
- (Australia) Peter Moore 9.18
- (England) David Crane 6.20
- (England) Alan Jay 4.90
- (England) Stan Stevens 4.73
- (England) Alan Smith 3.75
- (England) Howdy Byford 3.55
- (England) Ken Adams 2.61
- (England) John Mills 2.61
- (England) Cyril Crane 2.17

Long Eaton

- (Sweden) Ove Fundin 9.64
- (England) Ray Wilson 8.63
- (Sweden) Leif Enecrona 7.68
- (Australia) Ray Cresp 6.72
- (England) Norman Storer 5.14
- (England) Vic White 4.97
- (England) Dennis Newton 4.96
- (England) John Mills 4.44
- (Sweden) Nils Ringstrom 4.12
- (Australia) Greg Kentwell 4.00

Newcastle

- (New Zealand) Ivan Mauger 9.82
- (England) Peter Kelly 8.05
- (England) Brian Brett 7.74
- (New Zealand) Graham Coombes 6.37
- (England) Mike Watkin 6.11
- (England) Russ Dent 5.82
- (New Zealand) Dave Gifford 4.57
- (England) Alan Butterfield 5.20

Newport

- (Sweden) Gote Nordin 10.44
- (Australia) Jack Biggs 7.23
- (England) Jon Erskine 6.03
- (England) Tim Bungay 5.54
- (England) Geoff Penniket 5.43
- (England) Alby Golden 5.34
- (Wales) Bob Hughes 4.75
- (England) Ken Vale 3.68

Oxford

- (Denmark) Arne Pander 9.53
- (England) Jimmy Gooch 8.14
- (England) Eddie Reeves 5.96
- (England) John Bishop 5.86
- (England) Maury McDermott 5.04
- (England) Des Lukehurst 4.10
- (England) Tony Clarke 3.93
- (England) Peter Seaton 1.00

Poole

- (New Zealand) Bill Andrew 9.12
- (England) Ronnie Genz 8.83
- (Australia) Geoff Mudge 8.22
- (New Zealand) Colin McKee 6.18
- (England) Pete Smith 5.76
- (New Zealand) Wayne Briggs 5.48
- (England) Norman Strachan 5.43
- (New Zealand) Bruce Cribb 4.20

Sheffield

- (England) John Dews 8.12
- (England) Bob Paulson 7.81
- (England) Billy Bales 7.27
- (England) Jack Kitchen 7.16
- (England) George Major 6.86
- (England) John Hart 5.93
- (England) Eric Hockaday 5.70
- (England) Arnold Haley 5.68
- (England) Alan Jay 4.82

Swindon

- (New Zealand) Barry Briggs 11.12
- (England) Mike Broadbank 9.60
- (England) Martin Ashby 9.01
- (England) Clive Hitch 5.88
- (England) Bob Kilby 5.67
- (England) Mike Keen 5.29
- (New Zealand) Frank Shuter 4.48
- (England) Pete Munday 2.48

West Ham

- (Norway) Sverre Harrfeldt 9.89
- (Scotland) Ken McKinlay 9.67
- (England) Norman Hunter 9.42
- (England) Malcolm Simmons 6.14
- (England) Brian Leonard 5.89
- (England) Reg Trott 4.30
- (England) Ted Ede 3.53
- (England) Don Smith 3.00
- (England) Terry Stone 2.32

Wimbledon

- (Sweden) Olle Nygren 10.40
- (England) Trevor Hedge 9.39
- (England) Reg Luckhurst 8.68
- (England) Bob Dugard 6.95
- (England) Jim Tebby 3.97
- (England) Tony Childs 3.23
- (England) Peter Jackson 3.20
- (England) John Edwards 2.88

Wolverhampton

- (Netherlands) Peter Vandenberg 8.67
- (Australia) Gordon Guasco 7.77
- (England) Pete Jarman 6.57
- (England) Alan Cowland 5.47
- (England) James Bond 5.46
- (Wales) Cyril Francis 5.46
- (England) Brian Maxted 5.31
- (England) Dave Hemus 5.14

== See also ==
- List of United Kingdom Speedway League Champions
- Knockout Cup (speedway)
