= British League Knockout Cup 1966 =

British motorcycle speedway event

1966 British League Knockout Cup
Tournament details
- Country: England

Final positions
- Champions: Halifax Dukes
- Runners-up: Wimbledon Dons

The British League Knockout Cup 1966 was the 28th edition of the Knockout Cup. Halifax Dukes won the cup and therefore secured the league and cup double.

== First round ==
June 6

Newcastle Diamonds	54–42	Oxford Cheetahs
(New Zealand) Ivan Mauger 15*		(England) Arne Pander 15

June 7

West Ham Hammers	59–37	Exeter Falcons
(England) Norman Hunter 14 (Norway) Sverre Harrfeldt 14		(England) Gerry Jackson 15

June 8

Kings Lynn Stars	59–37	Wimbledon Dons
(Australia) Peter Moore 12 (England) Terry Betts 12		(England) Trevor Hedge 14 (Sweden) Olle Nygren 12 (2)

== Second round ==
June 11

Halifax Dukes	57–39	Glasgow Tigers
(England) Eric Boocock 14		(Australia) Charlie Monk 13

June 17

Hackney Hawks	48.5 – 47.5	Cradley Heath Heathens
(England) Colin Pratt 15		(England) Ivor Brown 12

July 25

Wimbledon Dons	50–46	Swindon Robins
(Sweden) Olle Nygren 13		(New Zealand) Barry Briggs 18*

July 26

Long Eaton Archers	54–40	Edinburgh Monarchs
(Sweden) Leif Enecrona 14		(Scotland) Doug Templeton 11

July 26

West Ham Hammers	61–35	Wolverhampton Wolves
(Norway) Sverre Harrfeldt 15* (England) Norman Hunter 15*		(Australia) Gordon Guasco 10 (Netherlands) Peter Vandenberg 10

July 27

Poole Pirates	53–43	Newcastle Diamonds
(Australia) Geoff Mudge 12 (1) (England) Ronnie Genz 12 (1)		(New Zealand) Ivan Mauger 21*

July 30

Coventry Bees	55–41	Sheffield Tigers
(England) Nigel Boocock 13 (1) (England) Rick France 12 (1)		(England) John Dews 10

August 13

Belle Vue Aces	60–36	Newport Wasps
(England) Cyril Maidment 15*		(Sweden) Göte Nordin 10

== Third round ==
August 6

Halifax Dukes	52–44	West Ham Hammers
(England) Tommy Roper 13		(Scotland) Ken McKinlay 15

August 12

Hackney Hawks	47–49	Wimbledon Dons
(England) Colin Pratt 14 (1)*		(Sweden) Olle Nygren 13

August 17

Poole Pirates	53–43	Coventry Bees
(New Zealand) Bill Andrew 9 (2) (England) Norman Strachan 9 (2)	Coventry tried to use rider replacement for Jim Lightfoot, but Poole wrongly objected. Match was re run as a consequence	(England) Nigel Boocock 18*

September 10

Belle Vue Aces	47–49	Long Eaton Archers
(England) Cyril Maidment 15*		(England) Ray Wilson 18*

September 14

Poole Pirates	47–49	Coventry Bees
(New Zealand) Bill Andrew 12		(England) Rick France 17 (1)*

== Semi-final ==
September 17

Halifax Dukes	60–36	Belle Vue Aces
(England) Eric Boocock 12 (England) Tommy Roper 10 (2)		(Hungary) Sándor Lévai 12

October 3

Wimbledon Dons	60–36	Coventry Bees
(Sweden) Olle Nygren 15*		(England) Nigel Boocock 16

== Final (First Leg) ==
October 5

Halifax Dukes	69–27	Wimbledon Dons

Scorers
Halifax Dukes

- 1) (England) Eric Boothroyd 3 2* 3 3 1 – 12 (1)
- 2) (Australia) Bob Jameson 1 2 0 2* 1 – 6 (1)
- 3) (England) Dave Younghusband 3 3 3 3 3 – 15*
- 4) (Australia) Dennis Gavros 2* 2* 3 1 1 – 9 (2)
- 5) (England) Tommy Roper 3 1 2* 2* 3 – 11 (2)
- 6) (England) Eric Boocock 2* 3 3 3 3 – 14 (1)*
- 7) (England) Maury Robinson 1* 1 – 2 (1)

Wimbledon Dons

- 1) (England) Jim Tebby 0 Ef 0 0 2 – 2
- 2) (Sweden) Olle Nygren 2 3 2 2 2 – 11
- 3) (England) Trevor Hedge F 1 2 1 2 – 6
- 4) (England) Reg Luckhurst 1 1* 2 0 0 – 4 (1)
- 5) (England) Bob Dugard 1 1 1 1 0 – 4
- 6) (England) Tony Childs 0 0 0 0 0 – 0
- 7) (England) Peter Jackson F 0 – 0

Heat by Heat

- Ht 01: Boothroyd, Nygren, Jameson, Tebby 69.8
- Ht 02: Younghusband, Gavros, Luckhurst, Hedge (f) 70.0
- Ht 03: Nygren, Jameson, Robinson, Jackson (f) 71.0
- Ht 04: Younghusband, Boothroyd, Hedge, Tebby (ef) 70.4
- Ht 05: Roper, Boocock, Dugard, Childs 71.0
- Ht 06: Boothroyd, Hedge, Luckhurst, Jameson 70.4
- Ht 07: Younghusband, Gavros, Dugard, Childs 71.2
- Ht 08: Boocock, Nygren, Roper, Tebby 70.2
- Ht 09: Gavros, Luckhurst, Robinson, Jackson 72.0
- Ht 10: Boothroyd, Jameson, Dugard, Childs 72.0
- Ht 11: Boocock, Roper, Hedge, Luckhurst 71.0
- Ht 12: Younghusband, Nygren, Gavros, Tebby 71.4
- Ht 13: Boocock, Roper, Dugard, Childs 70.8
- Ht 14: Younghusband, Nygren, Boothroyd, Luckhurst 71.0
- Ht 15: Boocock, Hedge, Jameson, Childs 70.0
- Ht 16: Roper, Tebby, Gavros, Dugard 71.8

== Final (Second Leg) ==
October 17

Wimbledon Dons	52–44	Halifax Dukes

Scorers
Wimbledon Dons

- 1) (Sweden) Olle Nygren 3 3 3 3 3 – 15*
- 2) (England) Jim Tebby 1 3 1 0 1 – 6
- 3) (England) Trevor Hedge 2* 2* 3 3 0 – 10 (2)
- 4) (England) Bob Dugard 3 1 3 1 1* – 9 (1)
- 5) (England) Reg Luckhurst 2 2 2 2 2 – 10
- 6) (England) Tony Childs 0 0 0 N N – 0
- 7) (England) Peter Jackson 0 1 1* 0 – 2 (1)

Halifax Dukes

- 1) (England) Eric Boothroyd 2 0 3 2 3 – 10
- 2) (Australia) Bob Jameson 0 1* 1 0 1* – 3 (2)
- 3) (England) Dave Younghusband 1 1 2 3 3 – 10
- 4) (Australia) Dennis Gavros 0 0 2 1 2 – 5
- 5) (England) Tommy Roper 1 0 1* 0 0 – 2 (1)
- 6) (England) Eric Boocock 3 2 2 3 2* – 12 (1)
- 7) (England) Maury Robinson 2 0 – 2

Heat by Heat

- Ht 01: Nygren, Boothroyd, Tebby, Jameson 68.9
- Ht 02: Dugard, Hedge, Younghusband, Gavros 72.4
- Ht 03: Tebby, Robinson, Jameson, Jackson 73.4
- Ht 04: Nygren, Hedge, Younghusband, Boothroyd 71.0
- Ht 05: Boocock, Luckhurst, Roper, Childs 71.1
- Ht 06: Nygren, Younghusband, Tebby, Gavros 72.1
- Ht 07: Hedge, Boocock, Dugard, Roper 71.8
- Ht 08: Boothroyd, Luckhurst, Jameson, Childs 73.2
- Ht 09: Dugard, Gavros, Jackson, Robinson (f rem) 73.2
- Ht 10: Nygren, Boocock, Roper, Tebby 70.9
- Ht 11: Younghusband, Luckhurst, Gavros, Childs 71.6
- Ht 12: Hedge, Boothroyd, Dugard, Jameson 72.4
- Ht 13: Boocock, Luckhurst, Jackson, Roper 73.1
- Ht 14: Nygren, Gavros, Jameson, Hedge 72.8
- Ht 15: Younghusband, Boocock, Tebby, Jackson 72.4
- Ht 16: Boothroyd, Luckhurst, Dugard, Roper 73.2

== See also ==
- 1966 British League season
- Knockout Cup (speedway)
