= Halifax Dukes =

Former British speedway team

Club information
- Track address: The Shay; Shaw Hill; Halifax
- Country: England
- Founded: 1949, 1965
- Closed: 1952, 1985
- League: British League

Club facts
- Colours: Red and Blue with White Elephant
- Track size: 370 metres (400 yd)

Major team honours
League Champions	1966
KO Cup Winner	1966
National Trophy (Div 2) Winner	1950
Northern Cup/Trophy winners	1966/1980

The Halifax Dukes were a speedway team which operated from 1949–1951 and again from 1965 until their closure in 1985 at The Shay Stadium in Halifax. The team were nicknamed the "Dukes" after the local Duke of Wellington's Regiment, whose training depot, Wellesley Barracks, was in Halifax, and used the Regiments elephant symbol on their race jacket.

== History ==
=== Origins ===
Eric Boocock (Halifax) leading Hackney's Gerry Jackson in a British League meeting at Hackney in May 1965

Speedway in Halifax began with a team called Halifax Speedway, who operated out of Thrum Hall between 1928 and 1930. Another team called Halifax Nomads operated racing a few away fixtures in 1948.

=== 1949 to 1952 ===
At the end of the 1948 season Bruce Booth had replaced Johnnie Hoskins on the board of directors at Odsal Boomerangs and in early 1949 he took control of the new Halifax venture, bringing in Eric Langton as technical director. On 8 February 1949 construction began on a new speedway track at The Shay. The team enjoyed good support during the opening season with a crowd of over 18,000 attending one meeting in September. They finished in 4th place.

During 1950, the team won their first silverware winning the National Trophy division 2. However, the season was marred by the death of Jock Shead on 1 July 1950, when riding for Dukes at The Firs Stadium in Norwich. Attendances dropped and at the end of the 1951 season and the club closed. On 31 March 1952, Dukes promoter Bruce Booth announced the end of speedway "while rates and taxation remains at the present levels".

=== 1960s ===
The 1965 Halifax Dukes Standing - Bert Kingston, Tommy Roper, Eric Boocock, Dave Younghusband, Maurice Morley (Team Manager) - Kneeling - Dennis Gavros, Bryan Elliott, Eric Boothroyd (Captain) (from The John Somerville Collection)

After a lengthy absence, the sport returned to The Shay in 1965, when Reg Fearman moved his Middlesbrough promotion.

The 1965 season also saw a major transformation for the sport. Previously the old National and Provincial Leagues had run as separate organisations with the Provincial League initially being unrecognised by the sports controlling authorities, but the gradual decline in numbers of the "official" National League during the early Sixties led to a reconciliation between the two bodies and the merger of the two leagues leading to the establishment of a single British League for the 1965 Season. The new team opened to big attendances as the sport hit another "boom" period and the Dukes finished in a solid fifth place.

The following season the Duke's riders' averages and form improved with Eric Boocock, Dave Younghusband, Eric Boothroyd and Tommy Roper leading the Dukes to a League and KO Cup double in only their second year of operation.

In 1969, the team's captain, local greengrocer Eric Boothroyd retired from riding after a long and successful career to join Reg Fearman as Co-Promoter.

=== 1970s ===
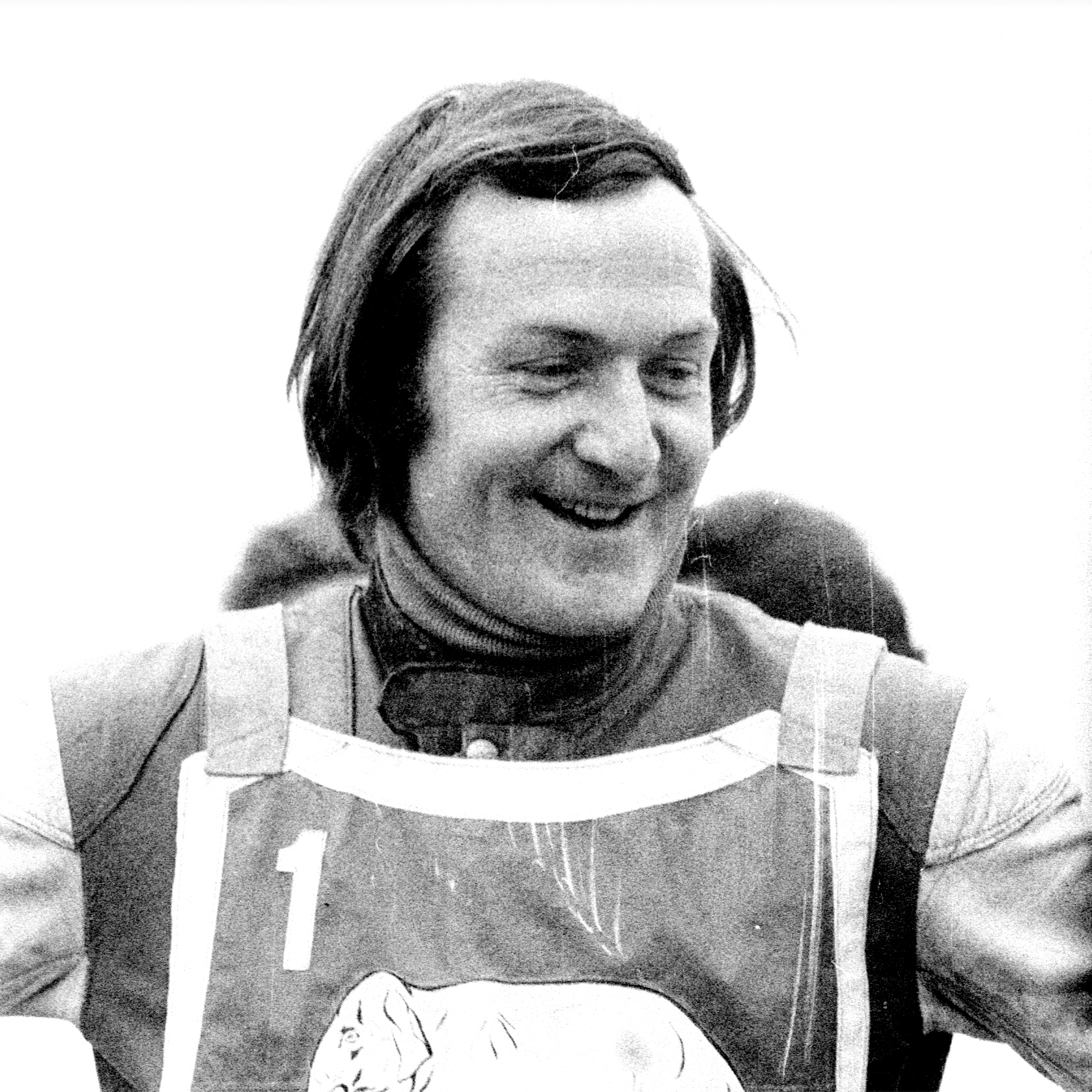
Eric Boocock

Dukes 1970
Standing - Dave Younghusband, Les Sharpe, Eric Boothroyd, Alan Jay, Terry Lee, Colin Mckee, Greg Kentewell, Eric Boocock (on bike)

By the early 1970s, the Dukes were enjoying higher attendances than Halifax Town. On the track the team were producing solid but uninspiring results, with a best league finish of 6th place at both ends of the decade in 1970 and 1979.

Eric Boocock remained the star of the team until his retirement after the 1974 season. Chris Pusey was signed from Belle Vue Aces and his replacement. A young rider called Kenny Carter was brought in for the 1978 British League season and together with Ian Cartwright pushed the team from 12th in 1978 to 6th in 1979.

=== 1980s ===
Despite the efforts of Carter and Cartwright, the Dukes struggled to compete with the big spending clubs of the 1980s, such as the Cradley Heathens and Oxford Cheetahs. Carter did win the British League Riders' Championship held at Hyde Road for two consecutive years in 1981 and 1982, establishing himself as the leading rider at the time. The Dukes found it hard to bring in suitable support for Carter and failed to compete for silverware.

By the mid 1980s, Halifax Dukes and Halifax Town had financial disagreements and in 1986, the Dukes left The Shay and Halifax, moving to Bradford's Odsal Stadium to become the Bradford Dukes.

== Season summary ==
Extended content

Year and league	Position	Notes
1949 Speedway National League Division Three	4th	
1950 Speedway National League Division Two	6th	National Trophy div 2 winners
1951 Speedway National League Division Two	6th	
1965 British League season	5th	
1966 British League season	1st	Champions and Knockout Cup winners
1967 British League season	7th	
1968 British League season	7th	
1969 British League season	4th	
1970 British League season	6th	
1971 British League season	14th	
1972 British League season	12th	
1973 British League season	9th	
1974 British League season	7th	
1975 British League season	10th	
1976 British League season	15th	
1977 British League season	17th	
1978 British League season	12th	
1979 British League season	6th	
1980 British League season	10th	
1981 British League season	7th	
1982 British League season	13th	
1983 British League season	11th	
1984 British League season	14th	
1985 British League season	4th	

== Notable riders ==
- (England) Eric Boocock
- (England) Eric Boothroyd
- (England) Kenny Carter
- (England) Ian Cartwright
- (England) Vic Emms
- (England) Arthur Forrest
- (England) Chris Pusey
- (England) Tommy Roper
- (England) Jock Shead
- (England) Dave Younghusband

== Seasons 1965 to 1971 ==
=== 1965 season ===
Extended content

The new track at the Shay Grounds was a big, fast track laid around the existing Halifax Town football pitch with high banking around all corners - just the recipe for high speeds and exciting racing and a considerable home advantage for the new team.

As a result of the merger of the two leagues prior to the start of the season, a control body had been set up to "equalise" the teams. This was needed because the remaining National League sides had team strengths way above those of the Provincial League teams and a certain redistribution of star riders from the stronger to the weaker sides was recognised by all as a necessity to ensure a competitive league competition. As with all such exercises though, the process was highly contentious as promoters tried to ensure the strongest possible line up and riders, naturally, had preferences about where they wanted to ride.

From a Halifax perspective, the process looked like it had delivered a poor result. Reg Fearman had decided to close his operation at Middlesbrough (performing as a mid-table side in the Provincial League) at the end of 1964, and as a result was able to bring some of those riders to the new Halifax side - these consisted of the up-and coming Dave Younghusband and Eric Boocock, and a steady middle order man in Clive Hitch. He'd also been able to persuade ex-England international Eric Boothroyd (now running a grocer's business in Halifax) to come out of retirement and captain the new side. The rider control process had allocated the Dukes one ex-England international, Bryan Elliott from Coventry and the team was made up by a number of young, inexperienced Australians - Bert Kingston, Bob Jameson and later Dennis Gavros. Most experienced observers predicted a year of struggle for the new team.

This feeling was initially confirmed when the team failed to make an impression in their first away matches at the Belle Vue Aces and Newport Wasps before opening their gates at the Shay to an enormous 5-figure crowd on 17 April. The opposition were the Long Eaton Archers, a team destined to struggle all season long, but with the young Ray Wilson and Kid Bodie both flying round the new circuit and the Dukes hampered by the absence of Bryan Elliott (injured the previous night at Newport) the "Archers" dampened the crowds celebrations by winning 41–36.

Success at the Shay was not long in coming however and the Dukes soon beat off the challenge of the Newport Wasps and Coventry Bees before recording a comfortable 43-34 win over local rivals the Sheffield Tigers. During this period Eric Boocock and Dave Younghusband were establishing themselves as forces to be reckoned with in the new league and Eric Boothroyd and Bryan Elliott (especially away matches) provided plenty of support. Clive Hitch was clearly struggling to come to terms with his new home circuit however and the young Aussies were inconsistent and still finding their feet. A month into the season and it seemed as though the team might hold their own at home, but would continue to struggle away from the Shay. To the encouragement of the promoter however, the good early crowd levels were holding up as the Halifax public took to their new team.

Excitement levels were maintained throughout May and early June as the team embarked on an incredible series of matches with last heat deciders at the Shay. During this period the team forced home 39-39 draws with Swindon Robins and Glasgow Tigers before taking a narrow one-point win 39–38 against future champions, the West Ham Hammers. This was immediately followed by another home draw against ex-National League legends the Wimbledon Dons. Vital league points were slipping away, and the team sank to the lower reaches of the league table.

In the middle of June, the promotion found a way of strengthening the side. Clive Hitch was still struggling to come to terms with the high banking of the Shay track, and was allowed to move on to Long Eaton and in came the much travelled Tommy Roper after spells with Sheffield and Long Eaton earlier in the season. Roper immediately started hitting high scores and was soon an effective fourth heat leader. Boocock and Younghusband were now almost unbeatable round the Shay, and hitting high scores on the team's travels as well. With Dennis Gavros and Bert Kingston beginning to provide regular support from the lower end of the team the "Dukes" were becoming a team to be reckoned with.

Substantial home wins were now becoming the norm, culminating in a 62-16 thrashing of a sorry Cradley Heath Heathens side on 10 July with Boocock, Younghusband, Roper and Elliott all gaining full or paid maximums. A first league away win, 41-36 at Long Eaton provided revenge for the opening night defeat at the Shay, and initiated a run of 4 further away wins (at the Poole Pirates, Edinburgh Monarchs, Swindon Robins and Glasgow Tigers) out of the remaining 7 away matches. Combined with a solid set of home wins during the remainder of the season, the Dukes soared up the table to finally finish in 5th place. This could easily have been 3rd had the away match with Cradley Heath been ridden, but this fixture was left unfulfilled following two rain-offs.

Overall, the weakish looking team at the start gelled over the early part of the season, added some strength in Roper midway through the year and finished almost as strongly as the League Champions, West Ham. Boocock and Younghusband had justified the promotor's faith by developing into established British League stars, and Eric Boothroyd had taken on the mantle of captain with aplomb – both in encouraging the younger riders and in delivering match winning performances in support of the top two. Bryan Elliott had faded slightly after some promising early season performances, but still provided solid second-string support throughout. Tommy Roper provided the catalyst for the late season recovery by delivering a fourth heat leader performance. Of the Aussies, Dennis Gavros had been the pick of the bunch and Bert Kingston had held a team spot all year. Crowd levels were high all year. It was a season for consolidation with the promise of more to come in 1966.

1965 Averages (League and Cup matches) :

Rider	Matches	Rides	Bonus pts	Total points	CMA
Eric Boocock	34	145	15	342	9.43
Dave Younghusband	33	143	15	324	9.06
Eric Boothroyd	34	137	25	274	8.00
Tommy Roper	15	56	19	102	7.29
Bryan Elliott	33	125	39	197	6.30
Dennis Gavros	23	76	20	92	4.84
Bert Kingston	34	111	15	114	4.11
Ray Day	7	19	3	19	4.00
Clive Hitch	18	64	14	60	3.75
Bob Jameson	7	15	2	11	2.93

=== 1966 season ===
Extended content
- finished 1st (54pts) out of 19

At the start of the 1966 season, it looked like the loss of Bryan Elliott who had emigrated to Australia during the winter would weaken the team as the only addition was Greg Kentwell who was yet another in the supply of promising young Aussies that promoter Reg Fearman had tapped into, but he was an unknown quantity in British League terms.

Success therefore looked like depending on the heat leaders from the previous season maintaining their progress, and for last years Aussies (Kingston, Gavros and Jameson) building on their experience from 1965 and taking significant steps forward.

A series of good away performances at the start of the season showed some promise although there was still only patchy support to Boocock, Younghusband and Boothroyd from the rest of the team. However, after a good 41-37 win over last years champions the West Ham Hammers in their first home league encounter, the team surprisingly lost 38-40 in their next match at the Shay to the Newcastle Diamonds. It was a controversial match full of incident - machine failures and falls costing the Dukes dear. The highlight of these early matches was the form shown by captain Eric Boothroyd, but by the end of May the team were languishing in the lower half of the table with the Coventry Bees showing the best early season form to lead the table by 4 points.

June however saw a change in fortune as the team racked up big home wins against Newport Wasps and Long Eaton Archers as well as a first KO cup win 57-39 against the Glasgow Tigers. This was combined with good away wins at Long Eaton, Exeter Falcons and a 41-37 win at the West Ham Hammers where Eric Boocock underlined his progress with a maximum 12 points. Although the contribution from the heat leaders was vital, the improved results from Tommy Roper and the Aussie brigade made the difference. Solid home scoring from Kingston, Gavros and Jameson was being complemented by more effective away form that was now showing in the team results. At the end of June, although Coventry were still 7 points clear, Halifax had shot up the table to joint second with Swindon, Belle Vue and Glasgow.

It began to look as though the bubble might have burst at the start of July when the Dukes lost heavily at both title rivals Coventry Bees (25-52) and Swindon Robins (29-49) in successive weeks - the ex-national sides heat leader strength proving too much even for the emerging Eric Boocock to master. Despite these reverses good home form kept the Dukes in contention, but July ended with further problems with both Eric Boothroyd and Eric Boocock on the injury list.

Despite the lack of the two Erics, sterling performances from Dave Younghusband and Tommy Roper plus significant contributions from guest riders Ron Mountford and Cyril Maidment brought two further away wins at the Oxford Cheetahs and Hackney Hawks. This proved to be the start of a lengthy run of wins for the team which, with a full team again, saw them unbeaten through to the end of September. At this stage the team were still 3 points behind Coventry at the top of the league, but the momentum was with the Dukes and not even the loss of Bert Kingston with a broken ankle in a cup victory over West Ham could dampen the enthusiasm around the team. Meanwhile, Coventry were struggling to maintain their progress following a dispute with their captain Jim Lightfoot which led to him missing a number of crucial matches. The only cloud on the horizon were a couple of official protests after the wins at West Ham (about the use of Kingston at reserve) and Hackney (about the injury to Eric Boothroyd), but the authorities eventually found in favour of the Dukes so the points were secure.

October saw the realisation of the team's and supporters' dreams, where home and away wins against the Belle Vue Aces saw Halifax snatch the league title away from Coventry. Then a massive 69-27 thumping of the Wimbledon Dons in the first leg of the KO cup final made the result of the away leg (a 44-52 defeat) academic as the team went on to scoop up both major competitions – just as West Ham had done the previous year.

1966 culminated in a record run of 15 consecutive league victories with all the team improving their averages and contributing to the success. Eric Boocock established himself as the star rider and made the breakthrough as a regular in the Gt Britain team. Dave Younghusband was a consistent high score all year after some initial problems with new machinery, but it was Eric Boothroyd who came up with a true captain's performance adding over a point on his previous years average. Of the rest, Tommy Roper again proved a remarkably effective "fourth heat leader" scoring particularly well during the second half of the year and Bert Kingston established himself as the best of the Aussie second strings although both Dennis Gavros and Bob Jameson had many notable meetings. Greg Kentwell had only a limited number of opportunities in the team, but had confirmed the promise with which he'd arrived and spent much of the year loaned out to Long Eaton to gain more experience.

1966 Averages (League and Cup matches) :

Rider	Matches	Rides	Bonus pts	Total points	CMA
Eric Boocock	38	161	19	421	10.46
Eric Boothroyd	38	164	36	381	9.29
Dave Younghusband	38	160	5	353	8.83
Tommy Roper	39	158	42	297	7.52
Bert Kingston	32	120	29	180	6.00
Bob Jameson	41	151	38	203	5.38
Dennis Gavros	40	134	31	167	4.99
Greg Kentwell	6	14	3	14	4.00
Maurie Robinson	6	12	1	7	2.33
Ian Wilson	1	2	0	0	0.00

=== 1967 season ===
Extended content
- finished 7th (37pts) out of 19

The successes of the previous year had provided a warm glow for all the supporters that lasted through most of the Winter. Then a cloud appeared on the horizon - in the shape of the dreaded Rider Control Committee.

Other promoters were insistent that the Dukes were too strong and in the interests of keeping the league competitive should release a rider. Various rumours circulated at the start of the year, but Reg Fearman was clearly under pressure to make a concession and after some hard negotiations, Tommy Roper was whipped over the Pennines to bolster the Belle Vue Aces following the retirement of captain Dick Fisher. Halifax were given "permission" to replace him with one of their own assets - Greg Kentwell. However, despite Kentwell's promise of further progress in the coming year, it was effectively replacing a heat leader with a junior. The local supporters were not impressed, and Rider Control Committee members were not welcome in West Yorkshire.

Nevertheless, the team still had the core strength of Eric Boocock, Dave Younghusband and Eric Boothroyd – a match for most. Some hoped that Bert Kingston and maybe Dennis Gavros could progress into the sort of solid scoring second strings that could fill the gap left by Roper.

The season started on 1 April with an away defeat (26-52) at the Swindon Robins, without an ill Dave Younghusband. A narrow (37-41) defeat at the Newport Wasps showed more promise and a win (47-31) in the first home match against the Belle Vue Aces showed that the team would be strong at home, but the return of Tommy Roper in opposition colours was doubly disappointing. He scored only one, but was involved in a crash with Bob Jameson and this put the young Aussie on the Injury List until July.

It was the beginning of May before the Dukes managed an away win (42-36) at Cradley Heath with Dave Youghusband extending his unbeaten run against the Heathens with a fine maximum. This was without Bert Kingston though who'd crashed heavily the previous Saturday in the home win over Glasgow and been diagnosed with a fractured skull which was to sideline him for 3 months. It was followed almost immediately by an upset at home when the Coventry Bees scrambled a draw. It was after a tightly fought contest, partly down to a below par score from Eric Boocock who had been suffering engine problems for some time and spent most of this match on borrowed equipment. Then, as if to underline the inconsistency, the Dukes went to Newcastle two days later and beat a highly rated Diamonds side by 44-34 with Dennis Gavros suddenly finding some away form with 6 paid 8. Unfortunately, this was to be the last away success of the year.

Maurie Robinson and untried Aussie newcomer Les Bentzen had been drafted in to cover for the injured riders, but realistically were hard pressed to match the expected scores from Kingston and Jameson. The scene was thus set for a period of generally strong results at home, but little to show from their travels where the inability of the second-strings to support the top three was leaving the Dukes short of firepower on away tracks.

June saw an early departure out of the KO Cup at the Poole Pirates where, despite track protests and an injury to captain Eric Boothroyd the Dukes lost 36-60. The month also saw the departure of Maurie Robinson from the team with a badly broken thumb following an horrendous smash at the Shay in the match against the Sheffield Tigers where the unlucky (or maybe very lucky) rider hit the fence hard and was thrown into the crowd.

One bright spot throughout this period was the form of Eric Boocock. He had overcome his early machine problems and was now established as a true international star, underlined by his top scoring for Great Britain in the series against Sweden and some magical moments in the following series against Poland (including an 18-point maximum in the home test at Halifax).

By the end of August, the team had established a consistent mid-table position following some solid home performances and despite the loss of Dave Younghusband for four matches with yet another injury. His return to track action at the end of the month however was an unfortunate affair. This was against Cradley Heath at the Shay on a very damp night. After winning his opening ride, Younghusband joined fellow Halifax riders Eric Boocock and Dennis Gavros in walking out of the meeting in protest at the track conditions despite the referee ruling that the match should progress. Halifax were allowed special dispensation to bring Maurie Robinson into the side as a replacement, and the match went ahead with various levels of enthusiasm from the remaining riders. Almost inevitably this led to the Dukes' first and only home defeat of the season by a narrow 38-39 margin, despite the effort of Bob Jameson who top scored with 12 from 6 rides.

In September, Eric Boocock took third place in the British Final (12 pts) at West Ham behind Barry Briggs and Ivan Mauger to qualify for his first world final at Wembley. In the big event, he came away with 6th place on 9 points after winning his first ride and scoring in each of his others.

For the team, however, the season petered out with more home wins (including a 61–17 thrashing of King's Lynn – a record), and yet more away defeats. This culminated in a poor 32-point thrashing at Oxford (23–55) at the end of September where only Eric Boocock with 12 did himself any justice. At least the final home match of the year at the Shay on 7 October produced a good pay night for the Dukes with all the team scoring heavily as the Newport Wasps were despatched 60-18. Only regular to miss out was Greg Kentwell, who had sailed back to Australia a couple of weeks earlier, and fittingly Bert Kingston scored his first league paid maximum for the club in what was to be his last match in England.

Ultimately, the loss of Roper and the seemingly never-ending series of injuries proved too much to overcome. A final league position of 7th was better than 12 other teams could manage, but was a disappointment after so much success the previous year. Of the riders, Eric Boocock had scored much the same as the previous season but had clearly improved further. Dave Younghusband had upped his average and become the team's most effective scorer at the Shay with an average in excess of 11. Eric Boothroyd had dropped back a little, but was still a solid heat leader. The real difference from the previous season lay below these 3 where none of the young Aussies were able to raise their game home and away to make up for the loss of Roper. Kingston had suffered a career-threatening injury almost from the off which eventually led to his retirement from British Speedway. Gavros was inconsistent away but excellent at home. Greg Kentwell had developed into a useful rider and Maurie Robinson had looked promising before also succumbing to the injury blight. Bob Jameson and Les Bentzen had found the year a struggle – particularly on their travels away from the Shay.

1967 Averages (League and Cup matches) :

Rider	Matches	Rides	Bonus pts	Total points	CMA
Eric Boocock	36	159	14	409	10.29
Dave Younghusband	31	128	6	292	9.13
Eric Boothroyd	37	153	23	322	8.42
Dennis Gavros	36	136	36	204	6.00
Bert Kingston	23	77	15	92	4.78
Kentwell Greg	35	132	27	156	4.73
Maurie Robinson	18	59	15	64	4.34
Bob Jameson	26	84	18	87	4.14
Les Bentzen	13	32	5	22	2.75
Others					
John Woodcock	1	2	0	3	6.00
Terry Lee	1	2	0	0	0.00

=== 1968 season ===
Extended content

During the Winter of 1967/8, it looked as though the Dukes would track an almost identical team in 1968 to the 1967 side. Bert Kingston had retired back to Australia, and Les Bentzen decided against another year with the team. Complications then arose in the New Year when Dave Younghusband put in a transfer request, which was eventually resolved by promoter Reg Fearman and later, when Dennis Gavros damaged a wrist in a garage accident that would mean missing the start of the season.

However, Fearman had a ready made temporary replacement in Alan Jay, a useful rider at Sheffield for the past few seasons, but who'd been allowed to leave by the Owlerton management. Other new players included young Australian Les Sharpe, recommended by Aub Lawson, and Greg Kentwell.

The season started at the end of March with another trip to a strong looking Swindon Robins side. The Robins comfortably saw off the Duke's challenge by 48-30, but Eric Boocock inflicted an early defeat on Swindon legend Barry Briggs on his way to 14 points. Boothroyd would score 9 points; however, the rest of the team found the going tough.

April saw the Dukes kick-off the home campaign with a good win against the Wolverhampton Wolves by 49-29 setting a trend for solid, comfortable home wins against Swindon, Belle Vue and Leicester during the rest of the month. Away, the team seemed to find another gear after the Swindon drubbing to go down to relatively narrow defeats at Sheffield, Leicester and the Wimbledon Dons. The top three were piling in the points again and Alan Jay was giving better support where a 10-point haul around his old stomping ground at Owlerton almost brought the Dukes a first away win of the year. Of the Aussies, Greg Kentwell was scoring well at home but didn't yet seem capable of carrying that form onto the away tracks. Bob Jameson was very inconsistent and newcomer Les Sharpe was predictably taking time to find his feet in English speedway.

The end of April saw the Dukes see off a strong-looking Exeter Falcons side in the KO cup 57-50, but were defeated in a league fixture at the Falcons County Ground home a few days later. Dave Younghusband dropped out of the team for domestic reasons, and ultimately the team would manage only 19 points as the home riders ran riot.

Progress in the KO cup was brought to an abrupt end later in May as a full Dukes side lost to the Wolves by 47-60, the team again relying too heavily on their three heat leaders with the rest contributing just 10 points between them.

Early in June, the promotion ran a double header to catch up on some previous rain-offs. The Dukes quickly dispatched the Glasgow Tigers by 50-27 in the first match, and this despite a lowly 4 points from Boocock, who was in the middle of a spell of mechanical trouble with his bikes. The second match brought on the Sheffield Tigers who proceeded to snatch a 39-39 draw and dent the club's previous 100% home record. This time it was Younghusband who was off the pace with only 4 points, and the rest of the side were unable to compensate. The match led to a last heat decider won by "Tigers" star Bob Paulson. Alan Jay contributed a well-earned paid 9 points in what was to be his last home match following the return of a fit again Dennis Gavros.

Just as the Dukes' management were coming to terms with dropping the home point against one set of "Tigers", the trip north to face the Glasgow Tigers in the return match a few days later brought the smiles back on their faces. With Jay getting a couple of wins in his last match for the Dukes, a rare away win from Kentwell and a solid 5 paid 6 from Les Sharpe, there was finally some support for the heat leaders and the Dukes came away with a solid 44-34 victory.

The next couple of months were to prove these hopes unfounded. Dennis Gavros immediately settled into a high scoring run at home with a paid max in his second match against Oxford Cheetahs who were soundly dispatched 56-22 and then scored a full max against King's Lynn "Stars" a couple of matches later. Unfortunately, he couldn't match this on the away tracks, and as before the Dukes were unable to get effective support to the top three. Reserve Maurie Robinson was brought in for a while to replace youngster Les Sharpe and although more effective at the Shay, was also struggling to score significantly on away tracks.

The World Championship rounds had seen four Dukes riders through to the Semis, with Greg Kentwell joining Boocock, Younghusband and Boothroyd, but he found the going at Poole a little too tough and dropped out along with a disappointing performance from skipper Eric Boothroyd. Both Boocock and Younghusband represented Halifax in the British Final at Wimbledon where Eric was in fine form to clinch 3rd place with 13 points behind the formidable New Zealand pair of second place Barry Briggs and champion Ivan Mauger. Dave Younghusband had to fight hard for 6 points to see him through as last qualifier for the next round. This was as far as he went however, scoring just 1 point in the Nordic-British final and, although Boocock qualified easily for the European Final, he went down with travel sickness on his way to the event in Wroclaw, Poland and was unable to compete. A sad end to his world championship hopes.

Mid-Summer saw a plethora of international matches. First against the Russian tourists closely followed by internationals against Sweden and Poland leading up to the newly formed World League. Eric Boocock was now a regular in the England team, and missed a number of Halifax matches due to fixture clashes, and with Younghusband also out for a couple of weeks through illness during July the promotion was kept busy making sure that the Dukes had effective sides out. They were almost undone at the end of July when the Ivan Mauger led Newcastle Diamonds arrived at the Shay and left on the back of a very close 38-40 defeat. Fortunately Eric Boocock was back for this one and scored an impressive 15 point maximum as the Dukes used rider replacement for the missing Younghusband. This included the only defeat of Ivan Mauger all night and an impressive last heat win to snatch the points for the Dukes when he came from the back to beat young Danish newcomer Ole Olsen and experienced Dave Gifford. This match also heralded the return of a rejuvenated Les Sharpe to the team.

A bit of a spat with the landlords, the local Football Club, at the end of August enlivened things for promoter Reg Fearman. They seemed keen to take a bigger share of the proceeds from the healthy crowds still flocking to the Shay every Saturday, but he was able to fall back onto the original contracts and the Town directors backed down before anything serious could transpire.

The remainder of the season then settled down into the familiar pattern of generally comfortable home wins, and equally comfortable away defeats. Exeter, Poole and West Ham kept things reasonably close at the Shay before the Dukes embarked on season ending scoring spree seeing off Coatbridge Monarchs 51-27 and Hackney Hawks 54-24. The final home match was against regular "whipping boys" of the time, Cradley Heath, and the team didn't disappoint racing to a 56-22 win with Gavros, Younghusband and Boocock hitting paid maxima and Greg Kentwell scoring his second consecutive home full maximum to finish the season off in real style.

The reverse was true away from home, with big defeats at Newcastle (28-50) and Coatbridge (26-52) followed by a better performance at Waterden Road where they lost to the Hackney Hawks by 32-46. By co-incidence, the final away match was also against Cradley Heath and the Dukes brought their away campaign to an end with a good 41-37 victory to maintain their unbeaten record against the "Heathens" at Dudley and finish seventh again in the table. Boocock and Younghusband were unbeaten by the home riders and Les Sharpe had a couple of seconds to emphasize his strong performances at the bottom end of the team as the season petered out.

So, all in all, it was an "as you were" year for the Dukes. Seventh place again in the league was respectable and solid performances at home had kept the faithful happy. In the main, the team had avoided the injury plague of the previous year, but the lack of support for the top three away from home meant that a serious challenge for the top of the table never materialised. Boocock, Younghusband and Boothroyd were all slightly down in the averages from 1967, but were still as effective a heat leader trio as most teams could muster. Alan Jay had performed well while deputising for Gavros in the early months and had shown signs of providing the away support required. The promotion tried hard to keep him when Gavros finally returned, but the control board insisted on moving him to Newcastle. As in previous seasons the Aussie contingent were good at home but generally weak away. Dennis Gavros did well to come back mid-season and score competitively from the off, but he couldn't drive on from his 1967 level, and Bob Jameson too seemed to stagnate. The red leathered Greg Kentwell was the one rider to significantly improve his average, and he finished off strongly which augured well for 1969. Les Sharpe too was a much more effective novice than Les Bentzen and his away performances in particular were very encouraging. Maurie Robinson had had another brief fling in the team mid-season, but had failed to establish himself, despite some encouraging meetings here and there.

1968 Averages (League and Cup matches) :

Rider	Matches	Rides	Bonus pts	Total points	CMA
Eric Boocock	32	141	20	356	10.10
Dave Younghusband	33	145	16	304	8.83
Eric Boothroyd	38	161	25	293	7.90
Alan Jay	16	62	10	94	6.06
Greg Kentwell	38	135	23	199	5.90
Dennis Gavros	22	84	15	114	5.43
Les Sharpe	29	97	19	94	3.88
Bob Jameson	38	128	16	120	3.75
Maurie Robinson	15	39	6	36	3.69
Others					
Ian Bottomley	3	7	0	2	1.14
Terry Lee	1	2	0	0	0.00
Guest Riders	2	10	1	26	10.40

=== 1969 season ===
Extended content
- finished 4th (46pts) out of 19

Popular club skipper, Eric Boothroyd, announced that he would retire and join management. Promoter Reg Fearman had been looking to expand his activities in the south, opening a new track at Reading, and Boothroyd' became co-promoter and team manager.

That left a big hole to fill in the team because, although not quite as effective as in previous seasons, Eric had still comfortably held down a heat leader role in the team. The captaincy was quickly handed over to Eric Boocock, expected as ever to lead from the front again in 1969. But any hopes that a "superstar" replacement would be forthcoming were quickly dashed, and instead it was announced that the team would be much the same as the previous year, with the "full-time" return of Alan Jay after impressing in his "temporary" stint at the start of 1968.

So, any hope of zooming up the league table rested on one of the "second-string" trio of Jay, Gavros or Kentwell upping their game and stepping up to the third heat-leader role, or maybe a jump in form from promising young Aussie Les Sharpe, coming back for a second year with the "Dukes".

Then, just before the season started it was announced that ex-Oxford star, Arne Pander would be included in the side at reserve. Not that long ago, he had been a top-liner in the National League, but a recent run of injuries had hit his form and confidence.

As usual the season started with a 34-43 away defeat at Swindon, but there was encouragement in the way that Eric Boocock twice beat Barry Briggs, relieving him of the Silver Sash match race title in the process, and the consensus was that Pander was worth more than a solitary point from his first match.

A series of challenge matches involving Belle Vue and Sheffield followed, with Boocock again to the fore, lowering his own track record in the Sheffield match. There was good support from Dave Younghusband as usual, and a string of double figure scores from "new man" Alan Jay.

A solid first league win, 45-33 at home against Wolves was highlighted by a developing partnership between Boocock and Gavros, and the following week the team lost by only four points at Oxford with Boocock, Younghusband and Pander getting ten points apiece. However, Pander crashed heavily in the second half and damaged his shoulder. It was the last that the "Dukes" were to see of him. Later in the season the authorities declared that match void and handed the match points to Halifax when it was determined that Oxford had fielded an illegal line-up.

The loss of Pander brought Bob Jameson back into the team whose Shay contributions were good. The team, with Boocock scoring heavily everywhere, finally finished April with a couple of good away performances, a fine win at Wolves 41-36 where the heat leaders had good support from Jay, 9 and Gavros, 6 and then a controversial 39-39 draw at West Ham to push the "Dukes" up to 3rd in the League.

May is traditionally World Championship month, with qualifiers across the country, but only Boocock managed the consistency to qualify for the semi-finals.

In this month, Greg Kentwell registered three consecutive full maximums at home against Newcastle, King's Lynn and Newport. Nevertheless, and despite a first ever loss in the league against Cradley Heath by 32-45, The Dukes were still comfortably in 3rd place, one point behind Belle Vue and Cradley in the League as June arrived.

The new month started encouragingly with a 41-37 win at the Glasgow "Tigers", with good returns from Gavros and Kentwell, 7 apiece, in support of Boocock and Younghusband. Good home wins against Wolves (43-35) in the Cup and Swindon (50-28) kept the momentum going but defeats at Belle Vue (28-50) and Exeter where the "Falcons" won by 43-35, despite an incredible 17 point haul by Boocock, held the team back.

At mid term, the "Dukes" were still third in the league but had dropped 6 points behind Belle Vue. Eric Boocock was still unbeaten by an opposing rider round the Shay and averaging over 11 points a match. Younghusband too had been in good form, but tonsillitis problems interrupted his season. Jay had contributed good scores, particularly away and Gavros and Kentwell in particular were dominant around the Shay.

July turned into a frustrating month though. Only one league match at home against Sheffield gave the Dukes a hard-fought 46-32 win and there was a cup win over Coventry (47-31) to cheer, but illness and injury robbed the team of Younghusband, Jay and Sharpe in important matches. As a result, there was a heavy defeat at Wimbledon (24-54) followed by a poor loss at Poole when the "Dukes" fielded a 6-man team, and then a controversial 38-40 loss at Coventry "Bees" when the "Dukes" finally fielded their first team again. Dennis Gavros was the meat in a Coventry first bend sandwich in heat 11 with the match in the balance, and the referee would exclude him as he was stretchered off.

So, the lack of matches and poor away form dropped the "Dukes" down to eighth in the table, just as a resurgent Poole "Pirates" team surged clear at the top of the table after an unbeaten run.

After comfortably seeing off the league leaders by 48-30 at home, the team ran riot 41-37 at Coatbridge to end their unbeaten home record with Boocock scoring another 12 point max and this time ably supported by the rest of the team, with Jay the hero after joining Boocock in a match winning 5-1 at the end.

However, that good form petered out quickly with key defeats at Leicester (29-49) and King's Lynn (37-41) and, for good measure, Sheffield won the Cup Semi-Final showdown at Owlerton on a rain soaked track. To top it all, an under-par performance of 8 points by Boocock in the British Championship ended his World Championship hopes early, despite being in the top three of the League averages for practically the whole year.

At least the "Dukes" shaded what was probably the best match of the season at the Shay by beating title challengers Belle Vue 40-38 on 16 August where Ivan Mauger and Soren Sjosten proved to be formidable opposition. After a tight match it went to a last heat decider but Kentwell's hard fought second place was enough to give "Dukes" the points. This match marked the first time that Boocock had dropped a point to an away rider at the Shay all season - March to 16 August.

So, as September dawned, the Dukes still lay 7th in the table, with matches in hand, but at the top, leaders Poole, had pulled out a ten-point lead over the "Aces" and now seemed uncatchable. This was almost immediately confirmed in the first match in the month which brought a comfortable 49-29 win over Cradley, but also the loss of the flying Greg Kentwell at such a key time with a broken collarbone.

September did finally bring a busy run of fixtures though with the "Dukes" still looking very comfortable at home but, missing Kentwell for most of the month, unable to quite do the business away although there was a creditable 39-39 draw at the Newcastle "Diamonds". It was notable for a first full 12 point max for Alan Jay (against Exeter) and a surge in scoring from Les Sharpe who picked up 12 in an away challenge at Leicester. The League season officially ended with a close 4-point win over Coventry in early October, the match winners being Boocock and Kentwell with a heat 12 5-1.

By then the Dukes had climbed back up the table and ended in a very creditable 4th place on 46 points, equal to Wimbledon, one behind Belle Vue but still seven behind winners Poole.

New captain Eric Boocock did manage to improve further, averaging almost 11 points a match, finishing as top Englishman and behind only world superstars Barry Briggs and Ivan Mauger in the league averages. Dave Younghusband had to overcome some niggling injuries and illness, but he also put 1/2 point on his average. In fact, every Dukes rider improved their average from the previous year.

There were two reasons in the end why Eric Boothroyd was not missed as a rider as much as some had feared. They were Greg Kentwell and Alan Jay. Both of them put themselves up into third heat leader territory, and between them generally came up with the required points. Jay was stronger than Kentwell away from the Shay, but for a long period in the middle of the year, Kentwell was almost as "unbeatable" as the Captain over home shale.

Dennis Gavros also put up his average to over 6, but still ended the year as a "good second-string". Les Sharpe had started steadily and didn't really get going until later in the year, but he finished the season in style and emphasized that the "promise" was still there. To say that Bob Jameson wasn't even in the team at the start of the year, it was maybe a surprise to see only Boocock and Gavros ride more matches for the team. And, when the team were short handed, they'd also been able to "blood" up-and-coming junior Terry Lee who'd rarely let them down either.

1969 Averages (League and Cup matches) :

Rider	Matches	Rides	Bonus pts	Total points	CMA
Eric Boocock	38	167	12	457	10.95
Dave Younghusband	32	122	21	281.5	9.23
Greg Kentwell	33	124	9	234	7.55
Alan Jay	35	145	37	257	7.09
Dennis Gavros	37	145	35	226	6.23
Les Sharpe	34	126	31	164	5.21
Terry Lee	9	27	5	27	4.00
Bob Jameson	36	118	11	110	3.73
Others					
Arne Pander	2	7	1	5	2.86
Ian Bottomley	2	6	0	1	0.67
Bob Tabet	1	2	0	0	0.00
Guest Riders	1	5	0	7	5.60

=== 1970 season ===
Extended content

At first it had looked like the team might be more or less unchanged from the one that had finished 4th in 1969. There were high hopes that any of Kentwell, Jay, Sharpe and Gavros might make that final step into a fully fledged heat leader slot. It was then announced that Dennis Gavros's brother, Jimmy had been killed in a track crash at Rowley Park in Adelaide. Shortly after, Dennis announced his retirement from Speedway. The management persuaded New Zealander Colin Mckee to come back to England, after playing with Edinburgh, Hackney and Poole a few years earlier.

Les Sharpe had made big scores against the visiting English tourists, and scored well almost everywhere, way ahead of previous seasons. It was almost the same with Greg Kentwell, who'd done well in the Australian Test Matches until suffering a bad ankle injury that curtailed his Winter racing.

At the top of the team, Eric Boocock had been retained, and Dave Younghusband had been persuaded not to go to Newcastle, so the "engine room" looked intact. At the other end of the squad, junior Terry Lee was promoted full-time at the expense of the loyal Bob Jameson. He'd had a good season at Middlesbrough the previous year so there was every reason to think that he'd hold his own in the higher division.

The start of the season went pretty well for the "Dukes", and it was immediately evident that the "new" Les Sharpe was going to be a real force to contend with, scoring well home and away in challenge matches. As feared though, Greg Kentwell was finding it harder to manage on his weakened ankle. Big home wins over the Coventry "Bees" (49-29), the Wolverhampton "Wolves" (50-28) and the Swindon "Robins" (49-28) in April set the scene for another year of solid home performances. Boocock was unbeaten by an opponent in the first two, but unbeaten also was Les Sharpe. The Swindon match was raced in damp, heavy conditions and it was Alan Jay who came to the fore with 11 points and a win over Barry Briggs. Away from the Shay, the team had won by 40-37 at Cradley and had only gone down by two points at a strong looking Leicester "Lions" where Boocock had an engine failure in the last heat.

May followed the same pattern with big home wins against West Ham and Newport before Coventry, who put up a much better showing than their first visit, were beaten again in the KO cup at the start of June by 43-35 as Dave Younghusband hit form with a good ten points.

Again, the team went close away from home, but not quite close enough when they lost 38-40 at King's Lynn (where Sharpe had a paid max, but Kentwell and Lee failed to score) and then by 35-43 at Poole where Boocock had a 12-point max, but nobody else could score more than five. All three Halifax riders, Boocock (3), Sharpe(7) and Mckee (2) failed to qualify from a tough Sheffield World Championship semi-final.

By the end of the month the "Dukes" were in 6th place in the league, but had three or four matches in hand on most of the teams above them.

Later in the season, new sensation Les Sharpe started to struggle with illness, though it wasn't clear at first what the problem was. After missing a couple of matches, his return during June was short-lived, and soon after getting married in West Yorkshire he was on the boat home to Australia, having "retired" from British Speedway.

During this difficult spell, the ultimately all-conquering Belle Vue "Aces" arrived at the Shay on 20 June and snatched a 41-37 win where the "Dukes" were handicapped by the loss of Dave Younghusband to an injury in an International match the previous night. This was to be the only home points dropped all year.

For the rest of the year Halifax were allowed to use "Guest" riders in place of the absent Sharpe, but they generally scored at least a couple of points a match less than the absent star, and so, although still comfortable at home, the team struggled to bring back points from their travels. However, the team pulled off a draw at Coventry with Kentwell paid for 11 points, and a win at the Newcastle "Diamonds" where six of the team managed wins on the night. And, out of the last seven away matches, the "Dukes" suffered two point losses at Oxford, Wembley and Hackney and only lost by four at Swindon and West Ham.

Ultimately, the team finished ten point clear at the top of the final league table. Captain Eric Boocock had a strong season, but at the end his average was about half a point down on 1969. Dave Younghusband ended up nearly 1.5 points down on the previous term.

Alan Jay stayed the same as last year, his average almost identical. Greg Kentwell also lost about 1.5 points on the previous year, the foot injury hampering him all year.

Colin Mckee's average was about the same as Gavros from the previous year. Final regular was Terry Lee, promoted from Second Division Middlesbrough, who averaged nearly 4.5 points a match in his first full season of senior racing.

In the absence of Sharpe for so long, Halifax gave opportunities to a number of junior riders, Paul O'Neil just pipping Malcolm Mackay to the title of "best of the rest".

1970 Averages (League and Cup matches) :

Rider	Matches	Rides	Bonus pts	Total points	CMA
Eric Boocock	36	154	14	406	10.55
Les Sharpe	18	77	13	159	8.21
Dave Youghusband	35	139	14	257	7.80
Alan Jay	38	154	25	246	7.04
Colin Mckee	36	131	35	195	5.95
Greg Kentwell	37	142	31	206	5.80
Terry Lee	38	127	25	135.5	4.27
Others;					
Paul O'Neil	3	11	4	15	5.45
Malcolm Mackay	5	14	0	5	1.43
Bob Jameson	2	6	0	4	2.67
Dave Durham	2	6	0	0	0.00
Guest Riders	12	46	12	76	6.61

=== 1971 season ===
Extended content
- finished 14th (34pts) out of 19

Despite the unexpected loss of Aussie sensation Les Sharpe half way through the previous season, the "Dukes" had finished the year in a creditable 6th place in the League Table. So it was reasonable for supporters to expect that, with an adequate replacement from Rider Control, there could be even more success in 1971.

Over the Winter though, these rosy expectations gradually took some significant blows. The Rider Control committee not only failed to find Halifax a replacement for Sharpe, but asked newcomer Colin Mckee to move away to Wimbledon instead, possibly in return for John Dews. There were also rumours that Dave Younghusband wanted away again, this time to Newcastle, a team nearer his North East home. However, they came to naught as the Newcastle promotion packed up and moved down South. The fact that Mckee failed to agree terms with Wimbledon and stayed at home in New Zealand instead was of no great help to Halifax.

The club promotors came up with two new signings for 1971. Firstly they brought in another Aussie in promoting the promising Crewe captain, Paul O'Neil from Div2. He'd been top scorer for the "Kings" in 1970, but it was a big ask to jump straight into Div1 and fill Sharpe's scoring boots. The second newcomer was Chris Bailey, snaffled from the Belle Vue junior ranks, and after a promising Winter where he'd become New Zealand champion there was real hope that he could make the grade. However, both moves were risks, and both moves were based on "potential" rather than proven scoring power.

The rest of the team was pretty familiar. Eric Boocock and Dave Younghusband were back to provide the spearhead, supported by the steady Alan Jay and the unpredictable Aussie Greg Kentwell. Greg was coming back after yet another "hot" close season in Australia, but also on the back of a big crash at the Sydney Showground.

Last man in the team would be young Englishman Terry Lee, back for a second season at reserve, but with high hopes of pushing on after establishing himself the previous year.

Perhaps the biggest change when the circuit re-opened in March was the track itself -- Boothroyd had spent the winter taking it further away from the football field and reshaping it slightly so that it was now an extra 22 yards in length at a 400.

Not too much judging by the result of the first home match, a big 55-23 drubbing of the Poole "Pirates" with Boocock and Jay unbeaten by the opposition, Younghusband taking three wins and encouraging 8 and 6 point contributions from O'Neil and Bailey. During the rest of March there were mixed signals though. A fairly narrow home 41-37 win over Glasgow, and a more encouraging win by the same margin in front of a big crowd over the strong Belle Vue "Aces" in a challenge were decent results, but Bailey broke his wrist in the Belle Vue match and would be out for a while. Away though, the Dukes went down at King's Lynn 25-53, with Boocock getting 13 of them. Although improving at the Swindon "Robins" to lose by just six where Kentwell marked his return to the team with a couple of wins, it tended to confirm that the side would be largely relying heavily on the Boocock/Younghusband partnership again.

At the start of May, after the Ole Olsen led "Wolves" had been beaten 44-34 at the Shay (with Boocock twice heading the redoubtable Olsen), Halifax were in mid-table with Belle Vue again in the lead.

At home, Halifax were solid as ever. No repeats of the Poole massacre, but a 20 point win over West Ham (Younghusband max) in the KO Cup got things off nicely, and then wins over Newport "Wasps" (46-31), Hackney "Hawks" (49-29) and Exeter "Falcons" (44-34) consolidated the start. Away, the "Dukes" were competitive at Poole and Exeter where they lost by eight and four points respectively, without quite threatening to win, but Kentwell's 11 points at the "Falcons" was encouraging. There followed what was to be their only success on the "road" when the team picked up a draw at the Glasgow "Tigers" with a solid all-round performance, led by Boocock, Younghusband and Kentwell. But having lost an eight point lead over the last three heats, even this success had a tinge of frustration about it.

On the individual front, the World Championship British Semi-Finals were held at West Ham and Sheffield in May, Ronnie Moore dominating with 14 points at Custom House, but at Owlerton, a single point separated the first four with Ivan Mauger eventually coming out on top over Ole Olsen and the Boocock brothers. Younghusband also qualified for the final from this one on 8 points.

At the start of June, Halifax had climbed to sixth in the table, still well behind leaders Belle Vue, but handily placed if they could just get "on a roll", avoid injuries and get the best out of Jay, whose recent scoring had been badly affected whilst suffering from a mysterious virus.

However, with only three league fixtures in the whole of June, there was little scope to make headway against the rest, and a 50-28 home win against a decent Wimbledon side in wet conditions which marked the return of Bailey from his wrist injury was the only league success. The "Dons" gained immediate revenge at Plough Lane where they won 48-30, although an 11-point return from Jay at reserve was an encouraging feature. Back in London at the end of the month, Halifax again suffered a heavy defeat, this time 26-52 to the Wembley "Lions" where Boocock (11) and Younghusband (8) picked up all but seven of the team's total.

However, there was some good news in the KO Cup. Nigel Boocock's Coventry "Bees" were dispatched 42-36 in a tight, entertaining fixture at the Shay. A last heat 5-1 from Younghusband and the fighting O'Neil settled it in the home side's favour, and although Boocock (11) and Younghusband (9) were yet again the big hitters, it was two wins from reserve Lee that ultimately proved crucial.

The British Final of the World Championship that month was a strange affair, with twelve of the sixteen riders progressing to the next round. It was won by the dominant Ivan Mauger with 14 points, but both Younghusband (7) and Boocock (6) qualified for the next round.

July started badly for the "Dukes" as they were held at home to a 39-39 draw. Younghusband almost saved the day with 14 points, and Kentwell did well to pick up 9, but with Jim Airey unbeatable, the "Tigers" hung on to take a point. They lost 48-30 at Belle Vue with only Boocock troubling the League Leaders, and 45-33 at Reading where he got better support from Younghusband and O'Neil but the lack of strength in the lower order at away matches was becoming a cause for concern.

Later in July came a 41-37 home win over Belle Vue, where Younghusband beat Ivan Mauger in a last heat decider. This match saw the introduction of young Mike Hiftle, recently transferred from the Aces, who earned 4 points. Hiftle's introduction was at the expense of Terry Lee, who'd finally been released after a string of low away scores appeared to have sapped his confidence.

On 30 July Boocock progressed to the next round of the World Championship from the Nordic-British final at Glasgow with 9 points, but Younghusband with 7 just missed out. The next day at Halifax though, Younghusband was the star with an 18 point maximum for Great Britain as the Swedes were sent packing 63-45.

The trend was set over July and August where the team was solid at home, with good contributions across the board in wins against West Ham(42-36), Oxford (50-28) and Cradley (42-36). Away, support for Boocock and Younghusband was sporadic at best although Jay did come up with 10 points at Cradley, but just at the time that Younghusband suffered a wrist injury that was to finish his season. In a rain affected match at the Oxford "Cheetahs" which the "Dukes" lost 31-46, Boocock weighed in with 17 points.

The KO Cup was still providing a ray of hope for silverware and Halifax progressed to the Semi-Final by gaining revenge over Sheffield with a fine 43-35 win in the middle of August. Jim Airey was again untouchable with 15 points for the visitors, but this time all the Halifax team contributed decent scores on a damp track.

The loss of Younghusband at the end of August was pretty much the end of any League ambitions. The side had already sunk to 14th place in the league. There were rumours that the German Josef Angermuller might be tempted over as a replacement, but continental commitments snuffed out that possibility, and no other continental top-liners seemed to be available. In the end the management continued to use "rider replacement" for the remaining matches where Younghusband's rides were shared out amongst the rest of the team. This worked okay for most of the remaining home matches and gave additional opportunities for the promising Malcolm Mackay, but left the side weak on their travels where Boocock continued to score well, but had only sporadic support from the other riders.

However, one match that it didn't work in was at home to a strong Leicester side in September who were pressing Belle Vue for the title. The "Lions", who had ten heat winners, came away from the Shay with a convincing 44-34 win to inflict the only home defeat on the Dukes all year.

The lack of strength to support Boocock brought the cup run to an end when the Dukes went down 27-50 at the Hackney "Hawks" in the Semi Final. The captain was magnificent, scoring an 18-point maximum, but the next best was 3 points each from Jay, Kentwell and O'Neil.

Individually, Eric Boocock progressed comfortably through the European final at Wembley with 10 points to reach the World Final at Ullevi, Sweden in September. Ole Olsen was a winner on the night, but Boocock finished on four points, although he did manage a win in one heat.

So, after being comprehensively wiped out at Leicester by 57-21, the Dukes brought the season to a close at home by seeing off the challenge of Reading by 46-32 with Boocock and Kentwell both being paid for 14 points. It left the team in 14th position in the league, pretty much where they'd been all the time from mid-season. It was another typical Halifax year. Dominant at home, but pretty poor on their travels. It was the first time that they'd failed to pick up at least one away win and, if anything the support for Boocock and Younghusband had gone backwards, not forwards.

Statistically, Boocock led from the front and finished with a ten point average yet again. Younghusband seemed to regain his mojo and put a point on his average to get back to around the 9 point mark and was unlucky to get injured just when in good form, but after that the stats tell a different story. Jay struggled early on with a virus problem and, although popping in good scores from time to time, by the end, he'd lost a point on last year's average. Kentwell too struggled with an injured shoulder all season and never really looked like becoming the consistent third heat leader that the team so desperately needed.

Newcomer Paul O'Neil proved a gutsy trier, getting good points at home, and some pretty important ones at times too, but many of the first division tracks were new to him so it was no surprise that he couldn't be as effective away from the Shay. At the tail-end of the team, Bailey started well, but the early wrist injury left him playing catch up when he finally got started again, but he did average over four. He produced some sterling rides, but not enough to keep him in the team all season. Mike Hiftle took over mid-season and, despite falling off a lot, was impressive at the Shay. He was equally unimpressive at away tracks but even so, managed to average more than the other two reserves. Last came Malcolm Mackay who was called up from Workington numerous times to cover for injuries and illness and produced some scoring.

1971 Averages (League and Cup matches) :

Rider	Matches	Rides	Bonus pts	Total points	CMA
Eric Boocock	38	175	15	446	10.19
Dave Youghusband	27	110	5	242	8.80
Alan Jay	39	168	29	258	6.14
Greg Kentwell	36	147	27	224	6.10
Paul O'Neil	40	158	27	198	5.01
Malcolm Mackay	20	44	13	57	4.56
Mike Hiftle	19	61	16	68	4.46
Chris Bailey	19	83	15	88	4.24
Terry Lee	21	65	6	61	3.75
Others;					
Russ Dent	2	7	1	6	3.43
Dave Durham	2	4	0	2	2.00
Reg Wilson	1	3	0	1	1.33
Alan Knapkin	1	2	1	4	8.00
John Lynch	1	2	0	1	2.00
Guest Riders	3	15	1	35	9.33
