= Les Sharpe =

Australian motorcycle speedway rider

- Born: 12 July 1944 (age 82); Fremantle, Australia
- Nationality: Australian

Career history
- 1968–1970, 1973: Halifax Dukes

Leslie Charles Sharpe (born 12 July 1944) is a former international motorcycle speedway rider from Australia. He earned eight international caps for the Australia national speedway team and two caps for the Great Britain national speedway team.

== Biography ==
Sharpe, born in Fremantle, began his British leagues career riding for Halifax Dukes during the 1968 British League season. He was recommended to the Halifax manager Reg Fearman by former Australian rider Aub Lawson.

After an improved season with the club in 1969, Sharpe would improve dramatically during the 1970 season recording an average of 8.21, putting him second in the club averages behind Eric Boocock. In July 1970, he would gain a call up for the Great Britain team, which at the time could include Commonwealth riders, for the test matches against Sweden. Despite the successful 1970 season, he chose not to race in Britain from 1971 to 1972, partly due to issues regarding his licence with the Rider Control Committee.

Sharpe returned to Halifax for the 1973 British League season before going back to Australia. He would represent Australia eight times in total.
