= Nottingham Outlaws =

Nottingham Outlaws is the name of:

- Nottingham Outlaws (rugby league team)
- Nottinghamshire County Cricket Club, in one day cricket and Twenty20 Cup games
- Nottingham Outlaws, the name used by Long Eaton Speedway in 1979 and 1980
