= Greg Kentwell =

Australian motorcycle speedway rider

- Born: 1942 (age 83–84); Sydney, Australia
- Nationality: Australian

Career history
- 1966–1972: Halifax Dukes
- 1966: Long Eaton Archers

Greg Kentwell (born 1942) is an Australian former international motorcycle speedway rider. He earned 18 international caps for the Australia national speedway team and one cap for the Great Britain national speedway team.

== Biography ==
Kentwell, born in Sydney, began racing midget cars before taking up speedway in 1957 at the Cumberland Oval in Parramatta, aged just 15. He became a protégé of Lionel Van Praag and began his British leagues career riding for Halifax Dukes during the 1966 British League season.

Kentwell contributed towards the Halifax league and cup double winning season of 1966 despite spending the latter part of the season riding for Long Eaton Archers on loan.

Kentwell spent the rest of his British career riding for Halifax from 1967 to 1972, in which time he was third on the Halifax averages in 1971 with a 7.67 average. In June 1969, he would gain a call up for the Great Britain team, which at the time could include Commonwealth riders, for a match against Sweden.

Kentwell continued to ride in Australia afterwards and would earn 18 test caps in total for his country, including an 18-point maximum against England in December 1967. He retired to concentrate on his plumbing business and later moved to the Sunshine Coast, Queensland and moved into the dredging industry.
