= Jock Shead =

British motorcycle speedway rider

- Born: 22 February 1926; Burnley, England
- Died: 1 July 1950 (aged 24); Norwich, England
- Nationality: British (English)

Career history
- 1947–1949: Odsal Boomerangs
- 1949–1950: Halifax Dukes

John Shead (22 February 1926 – 1 July 1950) was a motorcycle speedway rider from England. During his speedway career he rode as Jock Shead.

== Biography ==
Shead, born in Burnley, began his British leagues career riding for Odsal Boomerangs during the 1947 Speedway National League season. He did not ride in many matches during his novice season and was involved in a crash in September, when he hit the safety fence and somersaulted, escaping with minor injuries. The following season, he began to ride regularly for Odsal but only achieved a 2.78 average.

Shead joined the Halifax Dukes shortly after the start of the 1949 season and improved to a 6.38 average and started to perform consistently for his team. He started 1950 in fine fashion, averaging 8.40 for Halifax and was now a heat leader for the club.

However, on 1 July 1950, British speedway experienced arguably its worst night in history following the death of two riders on the same night. Shead was riding for Halifax Dukes at The Firs Stadium in Norwich and became the third rider in four years to be killed at the Norfolk track. During the semi-final of the National Trophy, Shead's bike collided with another bike and he somersaulted before landing, he was take to hospital but died shortly afterwards. Joe Abbott was killed on the same night in a division 1 fixture.

== See also ==
- Rider deaths in motorcycle speedway
