= Tommy Roper =

British speedway rider

- Born: 6 July 1940 (age 86); Bradford, England
- Nationality: British (English)

Career history
- 1960, 1962: Bradford Panthers
- 1961: Middlesbrough Bears
- 1962–1965: Sheffield Tigers
- 1965: Long Eaton Archers
- 1965–1966, 1972: Halifax Dukes
- 1967–1971: Belle Vue Aces
- 1971: Oxford Cheetahs
- 1974: Hull Vikings

Team honours
- 1966, 1970: British League Champion
- 1966: British League Knockout Cup Winner
- 1966: Northern Cup Winner
- 1963, 1964: Provincial Northern League Champion

Thomas Roper (born 6 July 1940) is a former motorcycle speedway rider from England. He earned four international caps for the England national speedway team.

== Speedway career ==
Roper rode in the top tier of British Speedway from 1965 to 1974, riding for various clubs.

Roper switched from Middlesbrough Bears to Sheffield Tigers in 1962 and would spend four seasons with the South Yorkshire club.

Roper left Sheffield to join Halifax Dukes in 1965 and was an integral part of the Halifax Dukes team that won the double during the 1966 British League season, scoring a season average of 7.54. In 1967, he moved to Belle Vue Aces and was a member of the 1970 title winning team.
