= Eric Boothroyd =

English speedway rider (1927–2022)

- Boothroyd in 1951
- Born: 26 April 1927; Halifax, England
- Died: 16 August 2022 (aged 95); Halifax, England
- Nationality: British (English)

Career history
- 1950: Tamworth Tammies
- 1950: Cradley Heathens
- 1951-1957: Birmingham Brummies
- 1957: Bradford Tudors
- 1958, 1960: Oxford Cheetahs
- 1959: Leicester Hunters
- 1961-1963: Middlesbrough Bears
- 1964: Long Eaton Archers
- 1965-1968: Halifax Dukes

Individual honours
- 1956: Speedway World Championship finalist

Team honours
- 1966: British League Champion
- 1966: British League KO Cup
- 1953, 1954, 1955: Midland Cup
- 1966: Northern Cup

Eric Boothroyd (26 April 1927 – 16 August 2022) was an international motorcycle speedway rider from England.

== Speedway career ==
Boothroyd was introduced to motor bikes by Geoff Duke when he served six years with the 15th Parachute Brigade in Egypt as a despatch rider. He first sat on a speedway bike in 1949 and began his career for Tamworth Tammies during the 1950 Speedway National League Division Three season.

In 1951, Boothroyd joined the Birmingham Brummies and would stay with them for seven years, winning the Midland Cup for three consecutive seasons from 1953 to 1955.

Boothroyd reached the final of the Speedway World Championship in the 1956 Individual Speedway World Championship and during 1957, he was suspended by the Auto Cyclist Union, along with Birmingham teammate Ron Mountford for riding in South Africa.

Over the next three years (1958 to 1960), Boothroyd rode in the top tier for Oxford Cheetahs and Leicester Hunters, before joining Middlesbrough Bears for three seasons, where he was one of the leading riders in the Provincial League.

After a season with Long Eaton, Boothroyd joined his home town club Halifax Dukes in 1965 and starred in their 1966 league and Knockout Cup double.

At retirement, Boothroyd had earned two international caps for the England national speedway team and one cap for Great Britain.

== Management ==
After retiring from riding, Boothroyd later became a promoter and ran his home club Halifax.

== Personal life ==
Boothroyd ran two greengrocer shops and died in 2022.

== World Final Appearances ==
- 1956 - (England) London, Wembley Stadium - 10th - 7pts
