= The Shay =

Sports stadium in Halifax, West Yorkshire, England

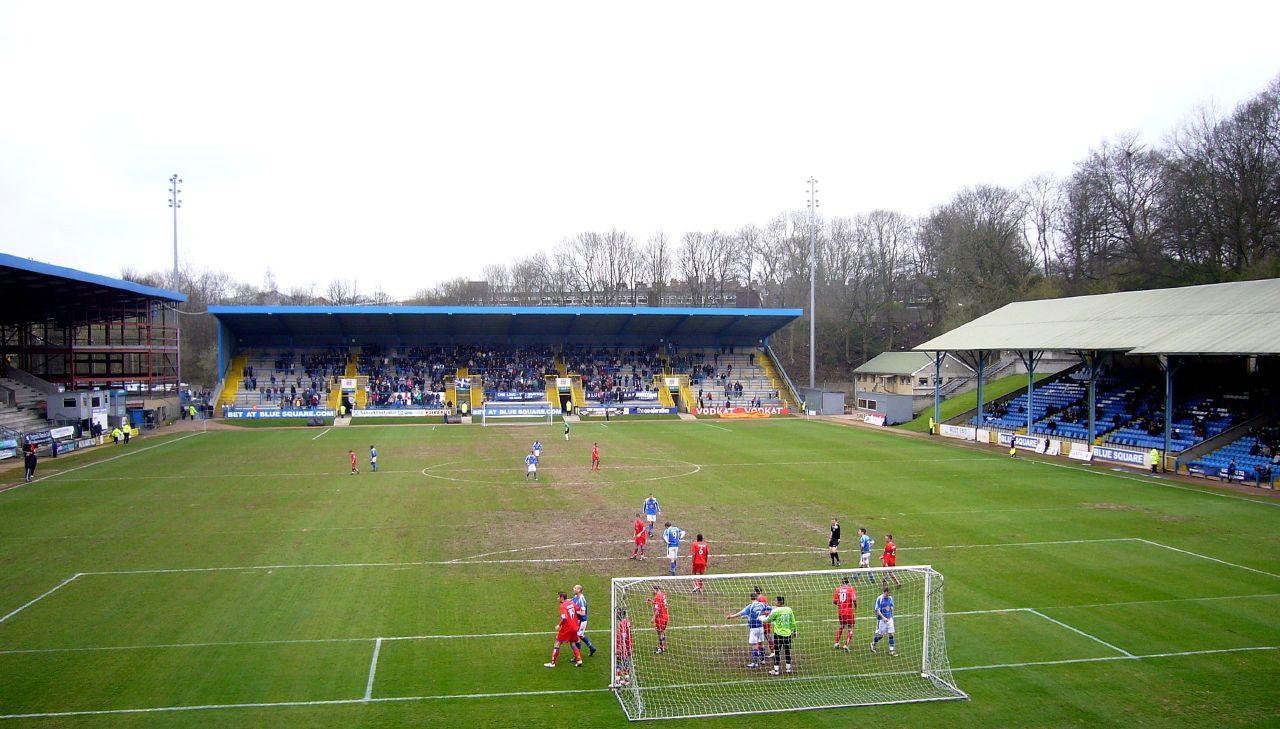
- Interactive map of The Shay
- Full name: The Shay
- Location: Shay Syke, Halifax, West Yorkshire, England, HX1 2YS
- Coordinates: 53°42′58″N 1°51′33″W
- Owner: Calderdale Metropolitan Borough Council
- Operator: FC Halifax Town
- Capacity: 10,401 (5,108 seated) (5,293 declared as safe standing capacity for North and South stands)
- Surface: Grass
- Field size: 110 by 76 yards (101 m × 69 m)

Construction
- Opened: 1921

Tenants
- Football; Halifax Town A.F.C. (1921–2008); FC Halifax Town (2008–present); Rugby League Halifax Panthers (1998–present); Huddersfield Giants (2011); Speedway; Halifax Dukes (1949–1952, 1965–1986)

The Shay is a multi-purpose sports stadium in Halifax, West Yorkshire, England. It is home to the FC Halifax Town association football club and the Halifax Panthers rugby league team.

The stadium is owned by the Calderdale Metropolitan Borough Council, who formerly leased the stadium to the Shay Stadium Trust, a nonprofit organisation set up to preserve the ground as a sports stadium. The council agreed to sell the stadium to Huddersfield Giants owner and local businessman Ken Davy in March 2025, however the sale is yet to be completed.

The Shay lies on the south side of Halifax, about a quarter of a mile from the town centre. The four stands at the stadium include the North Stand, the East Stand, the South Stand and the Skircoat Stand. The North and South stands were built in the mid-1990s. The Skircoat Stand is the oldest stand in the stadium.

== Etymology ==
'Shay' is derived from the old English word 'shaw', which means a small wood, thicket or grove. The two words are used interchangeably in ancient references to the property upon which the stadium was eventually constructed.

== Uses ==
=== Speedway ===
Before the Shay, speedway in Halifax was held at Thrum Hall. However, at the end of the 1948 season Bruce Booth had replaced Johnnie Hoskins on the board of directors at Odsal Boomerangs and in early 1949 he took control of the new Halifax venture, bringing in Eric Langton as technical director. The team would be known as the Halifax Dukes and on 8 February 1949 construction began on a new Motorcycle speedway track at the Shay. This meant that the football pitch had to be reduced in size and each goalpost was moved three yards into the playing area so an agreement was reached by the speedway and football clubs whereby the Halifax Dukes had to pay Halifax Town A.F.C. 10% of all speedway gate receipts.

The first speedway meeting was held on Wednesday 6 April 1949, and the opponents were Yarmouth Bloaters. The track was officially opened by Major R.E. Austin, commanding officer of the Duke of Wellington's Regiment at Halifax. Speedway at the Shay was not popular and poor attendances saw the club struggling financially. On 10 November 1951 speedway promoter Bruce Booth brought midget car racing to the Shay to boost funds. 15,000 spectators attended this one-off venture; 3 times higher that the average speedway gate. On 31 March 1952, Booth announced the end of speedway, "while rates and taxation remains at the present levels."

In November 1962, Middlesbrough speedway promoter Reg Fearman saw the Shay for the first time, and in 1963 he made a formal application to Halifax Town for use of the ground to revive the sport. At the beginning of 1965 work began on constructing the ground and speedway returned. The second time around it proved successful, and remained at the ground for the next twenty years. By the 1970s people valued it greater than football for family entertainment, with the Dukes producing such renowned riders as Eric Boocock and Kenny Carter. Attendances became regularly higher than those of the football club and the Shay often hosted speedway internationals.

In 1986, after disputes over money with Halifax Town, the speedway club moved out of town to neighbouring Bradford and the Odsal Stadium, becoming known as the Bradford Dukes.

The shale surfaced speedway track at the Shay was 370 metres (400 yd) long.

=== Rugby League ===
In 1998 rugby league club Halifax Blue Sox (now the Halifax Panthers) sold their historic home ground Thrum Hall, which had been their home since 1886, for £1.5 million to the retail chain Asda and moved to the Shay.

There have been many top players for Halifax over the years, including internationals, tourists and overseas stars. The leading 36 of these are featured in a "Hall of Fame" in the Weavers Bar at the Shay Stadium.

During 2011, as a result of pitch renovation work at the Kirklees Stadium in Huddersfield, the Huddersfield Giants played three home fixtures of Super League XVI at the Shay. Subject to the completion of the purchase of the stadium by Ken Davy, it is planned for Huddersfield to temporarily occupy the Shay as their home stadium from 2026 onwards while a new stadium is built for the club.

==== 2013 Rugby League World Cup ====
The Shay played host to a Group C game as part of the 2013 World Cup between Tonga and Italy.

No.	Date	Winners	Score	Runners up	Attendance	Competition
1	10 November 2013	Tonga	16-0	Italy	10,266	2013 World Cup

== Structure ==
=== North Stand ===
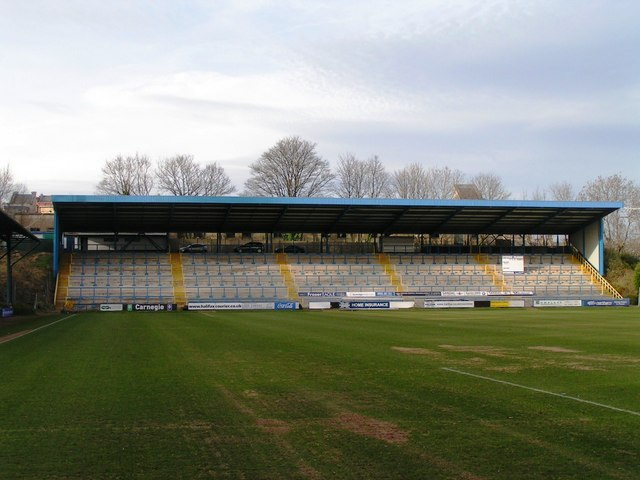
North Stand

The North Stand, a terraced stand, was completed first (before the South Stand), which enabled Halifax Town to return to the Football League when it won the Conference in 1998. The South Stand was completed within the next year.

The stand is usually where away fans are housed. In recent times the stand has been left been unused during Halifax Town matches due to low numbers of away fans travelling to the stadium. For rugby league, the stand is usually open.

=== South Stand ===
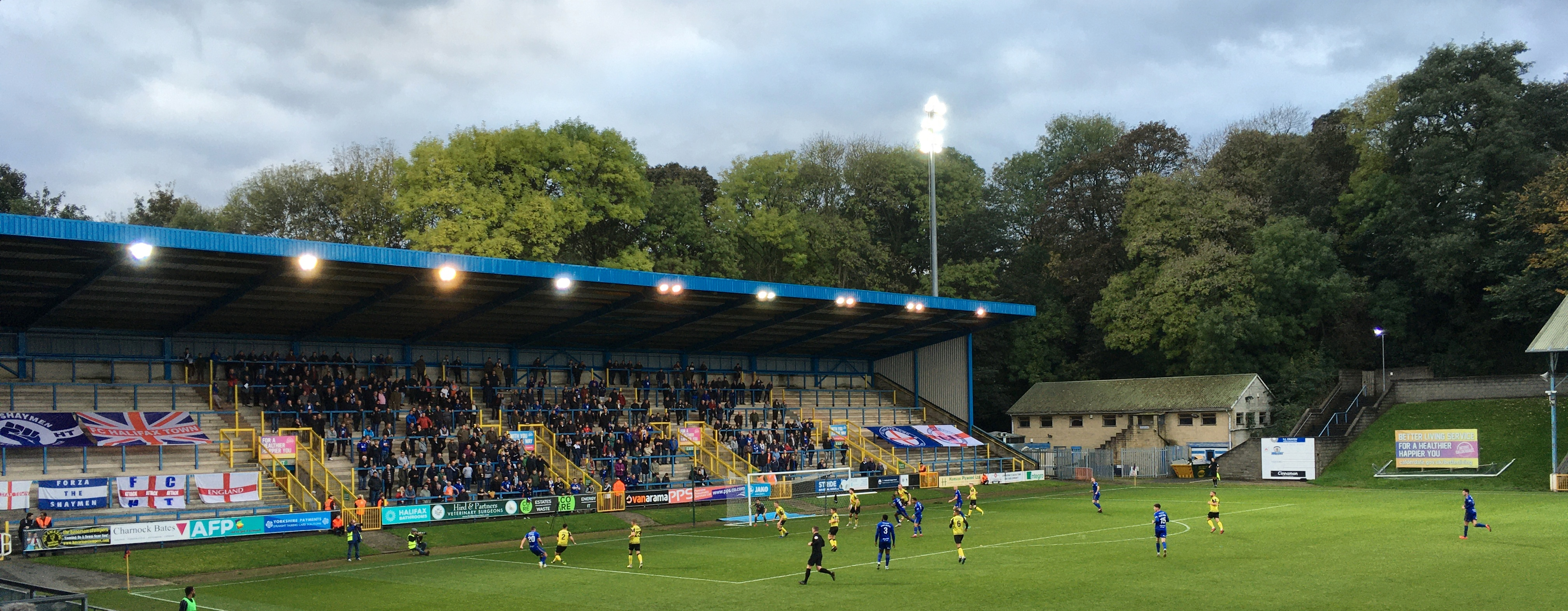
South Stand

The South Stand, also a terraced stand, is generally where the home fans stand, originally being used as the away stand. The stand has a bar in its concourse and catering facilities are situated outside.

=== East Stand ===
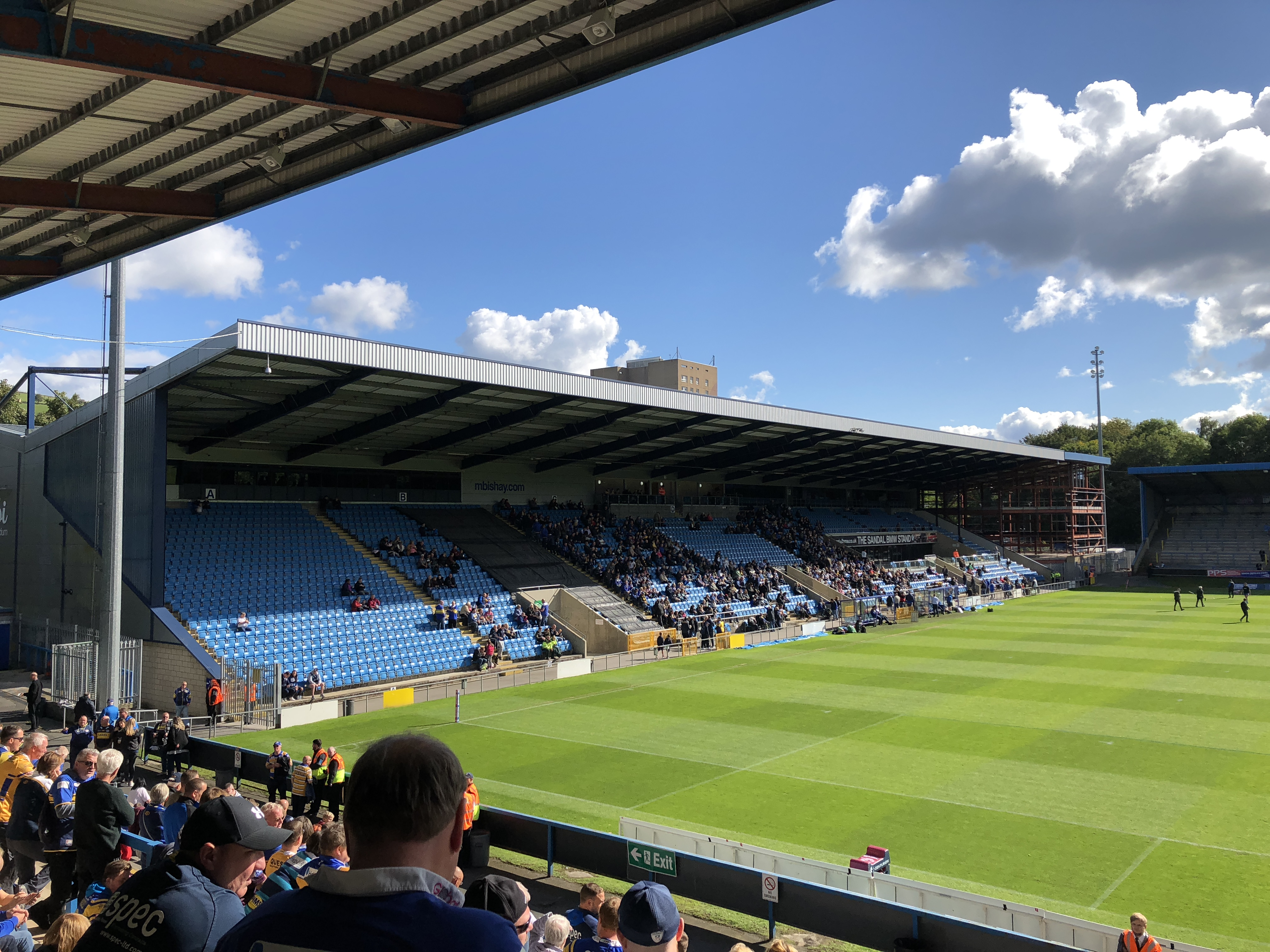
East Stand

The East Stand is now the main stand at the Shay, opening on 28 March 2010 with an all-seater capacity of 3,500, taking the overall ground capacity to over 10,000. There are 11 function rooms, ranging in size to accommodate events for up to 350 guests. Club shops for the local football and rugby teams are also built into the East Stand, as well as new home and away changing rooms, a physio room and new food and beverage kiosks for fans.

After the Family Stand, which stood on the site of the East Stand, had been demolished in 2000, construction on a new East Stand was stopped when Halifax Town were relegated in 2002. The stand remained in an incomplete state until late 2008, when Calderdale Council agreed to put money into completing the stand. The stand was redesigned by Sheffield-based architects Ward McHugh Associates prior to the commencement of works. Main structural work on the stand was completed in December 2009, and the stand was opened in March 2010.

Within the original East Stand designs there were plans for hospitality and media facilities in the south-east corner of the stadium. This stand (which is adjoined to the East Stand and of the same height) has been in a partially constructed state since work halted on the East Stand in 2002. This corner was omitted from the 2008 redesign and subsequent completion of the East Stand.

=== Skircoat West Stand ===
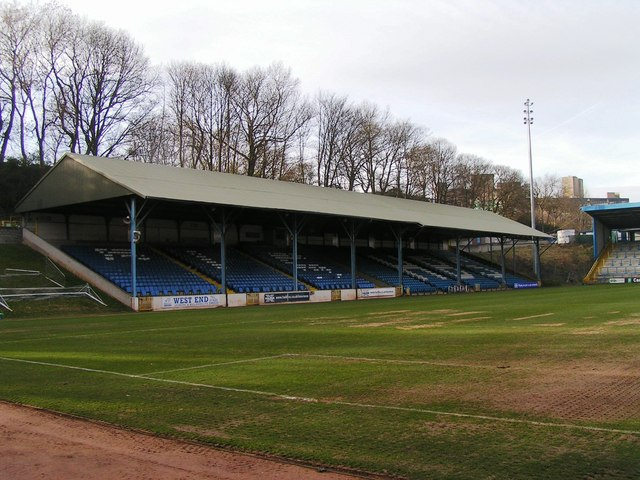
Skircoat (West) Stand

The stand used to be half-seating half-standing but became all-seater in 1998. It is the oldest part of the ground and is not the full length of the pitch. Like the North Stand it was built on the side of a slope and backs onto the main road.

Although no plans for future redevelopment have been confirmed, there has been talk of a new west stand, replacing the current Skircoat Stand. The plan was to build a two-tier stand with shops that backed onto Skircoat Road, however nothing has been officially announced.

== Community usage ==
In June 2007, Shay Stadium Community Football was formed. The community scheme was set up as a non for profit organisation using the stadium as a main hub. The leader of the project was Lee Ashforth who drove the company forwards and set up a committee based on 4 directors who previously had been involved with the Shay Stadium Trust. The company started by delivering sessions aimed at primary school children and delivering holiday courses throughout every school holiday.

There is also a 5-a-side pitch next to the southern turnstiles that can be hired.

Since the company then grew and included nurseries and adult sessions aimed at fitness and socialising. The community scheme also delivers a BTEC education course at 16–18 years of age.
