= Alan Jay =

British motorcycle speedway rider

- Born: 18 January 1941 (age 85); Oxford, England
- Nationality: British (English)

Career history
- 1961–1967: Sheffield Tigers
- 1966: King's Lynn Stars
- 1968–1972: Halifax Dukes
- 1968: Newcastle Diamonds
- 1973–1975: Coventry Bees

Team honours
- 1962, 1963, 1964: Provincial Northern League

Alan Wilfred Lawrence Jay (born 18 January 1941) is a former international motorcycle speedway rider from England. He earned one international cap for the England national speedway team.

== Biography ==
Jay, born in Oxford, began his British leagues career riding for Sheffield Tigers during the 1961 Provincial Speedway League. He remained with Sheffield for seven years and followed the club's move to the British League during that time.

In 1968, Jay was loaned to Halifax Dukes before joining Newcastle Diamonds later that season.

The following season in 1969, Jay signed for Halifax and would spend four more seasons with them, improving his average to 7.16 in 1969. In 1973, he joined Coventry Bees, where he remained until his retirement after the 1975 season.
