= Eric Boocock =

British motorcycle speedway rider

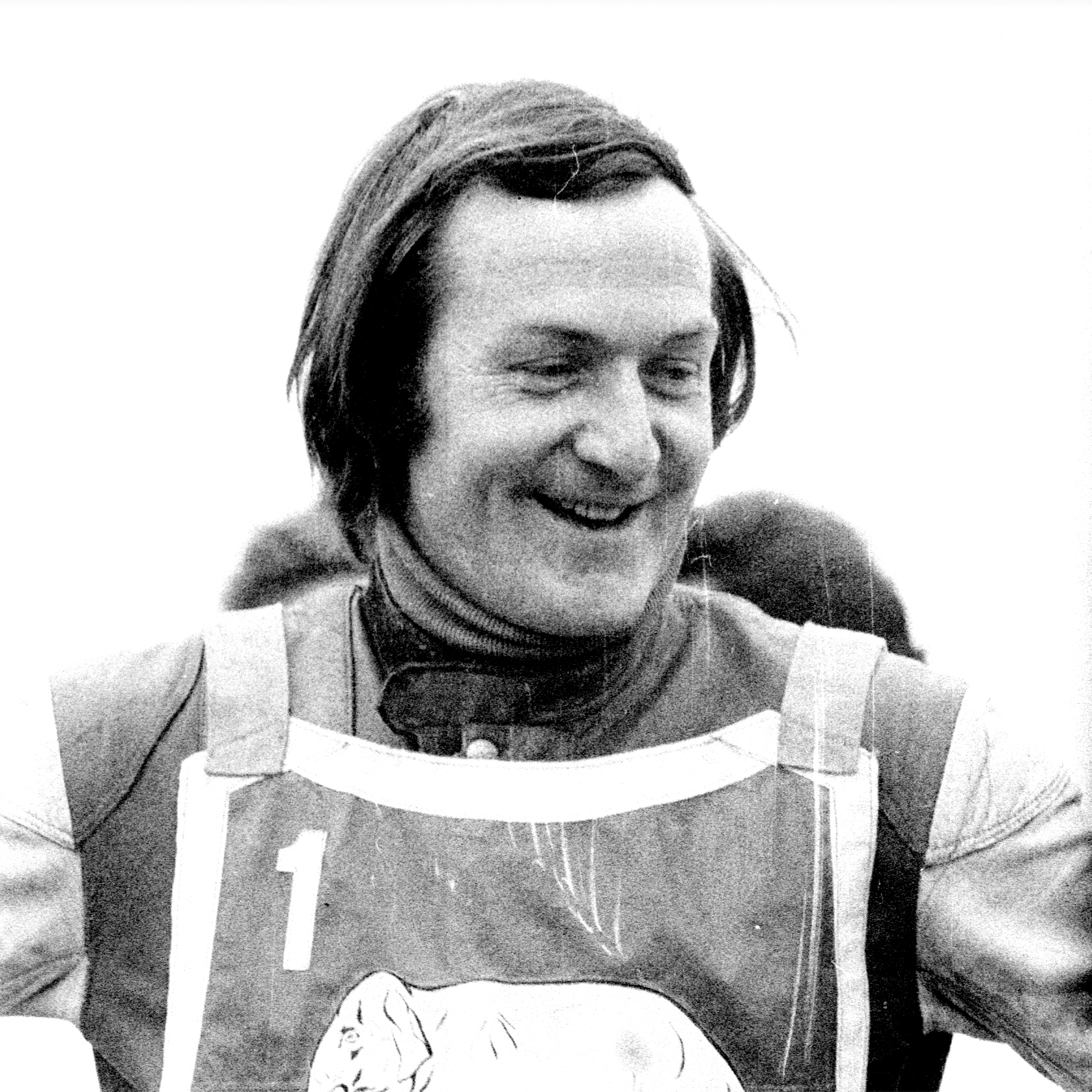
- Born: 28 February 1945 (age 81); Dewsbury, England
- Nationality: British (English)

Career history
- 1961–1964: Middlesbrough Bears
- 1964: Long Eaton Archers
- 1965–1974, 1983: Halifax Dukes

Individual honours
- 1974: British Champion
- 1970: Northern Riders Champion
- 1968: NSW State Champion

Team honours
- 1966: British League Champion
- 1966: British League KO Cup
- 1966: Northern Cup Winner

Eric Henry Boocock (born 28 February 1945 in Dewsbury, England) is a former motorcycle speedway rider who appeared in three Speedway World Championship finals. He was the joint manager of the Great Britain national speedway team with Colin Pratt and earned 53 international caps for the England national speedway team and 37 caps for Great Britain.

== Career ==
Boocock started his career with the Middlesbrough Bears in 1961 and stayed there until the promotion closed in 1964. The promoter, Reg Fearman opened up a speedway track at The Shay in Halifax and moved his Middlesbrough riders there, to form the Halifax Dukes. Boocock spent his entire career with the Dukes from 1965, winning the British League and the KO Cup in 1966. He made three World final appearances and appeared with brother Nigel Boocock in the 1970 Speedway World Pairs Championship finals, finishing in third place. He was also a regular England International rider.

Boocock became British Champion in 1974 after finishing on the rostrum three times previously. The same season, he became the first rider to gain a testimonial meeting for his services to speedway and then retired as a racer at the early age of 29. He appeared again briefly for the Halifax Dukes in 1983 but retired shortly after.

=== Manager and promoter ===
In 1975, Boocock became team manager of the Belle Vue Aces, where he stayed for seven seasons. In 1976, he also helped Peter Collins win the Speedway World Championship by stripping, cleaning and rebuilding his clutch between heats in the final. In 1980, he became coach of England, with Ian Thomas as team manager, winning the World Team Cup and the Speedway World Pairs Championship, and with Michael Lee also becoming World Champion. In 1982, he had a season as England team manager, and in 1986, he was appointed joint manager with Colin Pratt, with whom he spent seven years at the helm.

In 2004, Boocock became co-promoter of the Hull Vikings, and they won the Premier League, the Knock-Out Cup and the Craven Shield. He then went on to be team manager the Belle Vue Aces with Chris Morton. In 2008, he became co-promoter and manager at the Sheffield Tigers. He has served several terms on the British Speedway Promoters' Association management committee.

== World Final Appearances ==
=== Individual World Championship ===
- 1967 – (England) London, Wembley Stadium – 7th – 9pts
- 1971 – (Sweden) Gothenburg, Ullevi – 11th – 4pts
- 1972 – (England) London, Wembley Stadium – 15th – 2pts

=== World Pairs Championship ===
- 1970 – (Sweden) Malmö, Malmö Stadion (with Nigel Boocock) – 3rd – 19pts (13)

=== World Team Cup ===
- 1967 – (Sweden) Malmö, Malmö Stadion (with Ray Wilson / Barry Briggs / Ivan Mauger / Colin Pratt) – 3rd= – 19pts (5)
- 1970 – (England) London, Wembley Stadium (with Ivan Mauger / Barry Briggs / Nigel Boocock / Ray Wilson) – 2nd – 31pts (5)
