= Bob Paulson (speedway rider) =

British motorcycle speedway rider

- Born: 27 March 1942; Basford, Nottingham, England
- Died: 3 November 1982 (aged 40); South Leverton, England
- Nationality: British (English)

Career history
- 1965–1974: Sheffield Tigers

Team honours
- 1974: Knockout Cup
- 1973, 1974: Northern Trophy

Robert Paulson (27 March 1942 – 3 November 1982) was an international motorcycle speedway rider from England. He earned three international caps for the England national speedway team.

== Biography ==
Paulson, born in Basford, Nottingham, began his British leagues career riding for Sheffield Tigers during the 1965 British League season, which was the inaugural season of the new British league. He made a significant impact, averaging 4.54 and becoming a Sheffield regular in his first season.

In just his second season, Paulson was called up by the England team to represent them against Scotland in an international fixture and finished the season second in the Sheffield team averages.

Paulson remained a Sheffield rider for his entire career from 1965 to 1974, spending ten seasons with them and becoming the club captain. During his last season with Sheffield, he finally won a trophy, helping his team to the 1974 Knockout Cup win.

On 3 November 1982, Paulson committed suicide by carbon monoxide poisoning, after the bankruptcy of a company that owed him money for a contract and ongoing depression.
