= Dave Younghusband =

English motorcycle speedway rider

- Born: 4 May 1938 (age 88); Weardale, County Durham, England
- Nationality: British (English)

Career history
- 1962-1964: Middlesbrough Bears
- 1964: Edinburgh Monarchs
- 1965-1972: Halifax Dukes
- 1974: Cradley Heathens

Individual honours
- 1968, 1971: British Championship finalist

Team honours
- 1966: British League Champion
- 1966: British League Knockout Cup Winner
- 1966: Northern Cup Winner

Joseph David Younghusband (born 4 May 1938) is a former motorcycle speedway rider from England. He earned eight international caps for the England national speedway team and three caps for the Great Britain team.

== Speedway career ==
Younghusband started his career racing for Middlesbrough Bears during the 1962 Provincial Speedway League season and improved his average to 7.92 in 1963 and 9.07 in 1964, the latter topping the club's averages.

Younghusband rode in the top tier of British Speedway from 1965-1974, riding for Halifax Dukes from 1965 to 1972. He later rode for Cradley Heathens. He reached the final of the British Speedway Championship in 1968 and 1971.
