= Dick Fisher (speedway rider) =

British motorcycle speedway rider

- Born: 13 January 1933; Lancaster, Lancashire, England
- Died: 30 November 1986 (aged 53); Ellel, Lancashire, England
- Nationality: British (English)

Career history
- 1951: Fleetwood Flyers
- 1953-1966: Belle Vue Aces

Individual honours
- 1963, 1964: Speedway World Championship finalist

Team honours
- 1963: National League Champion
- 1958: National Trophy Winner
- 1957, 1958, 1960: Britannia Shield

Richard Metcalfe Fisher (13 January 1933 – 30 November 1986) was an international motorcycle speedway rider from England.

== Speedway career ==
Fisher reached the final of the Speedway World Championship in the 1963 Individual Speedway World Championship and 1964 Individual Speedway World Championship.

Fisher rode in the top tier of British Speedway from 1953 to 1966, riding for Belle Vue Aces. He started his career at Fleetwood Flyers.

Fisher was capped by the England national speedway team once and Great Britain four times. He was the Belle Vue captain for three seasons and rode for them for 14 consecutive seasons in 264 National League matches and scored 1797 points.

== World final appearances ==
=== Individual World Championship ===
- 1963 – (England) London, Wembley Stadium – 13th – 5pts
- 1964 – (Sweden) Gothenburg, Ullevi – 16th – 1pt

=== World Team Cup ===
- 1963 - (Austria) Vienna, Stadion Wien (with Barry Briggs / Peter Craven / Peter Moore) - 3rd - 25pts (4)
