= Reg Fearman =

Retired motorcycle speedway rider

- Born: 26 April 1933; London, England
- Nationality: British (English)

Career history
- 1949-1951, 1953: West Ham Hammers
- 1952-1953, 1960-1962: Stoke Potters
- 1953-1954, 1956-1957: Leicester Hunters
- 1959: Yarmouth Bloaters

Team honours
- 1960: Northern Cup
- 1961: Northern League

Reginald Arthur Victor Fearman (born 26 April 1933 in London, England) is a former international motorcycle speedway rider and promoter.

== Riding career ==
Fearman, a local lad from Plaistow, first received his speedway licence on his sixteenth birthday, presented to him in front of a forty thousand strong West Ham crowd at the West Ham Stadium in London. He was nicknamed "Fearless Fearman" for his daredevil style of riding.

Fearman first rode at Rye House on 1 August 1948 (scoring eleven points) but was immediately banned by the Speedway Control Board (SCB) and the Auto Cycle Union (ACU) when it was discovered he was still only fifteen years of age. Reg spent most of his career with the West Ham Hammers.

In 1952, after transfer speculation linking him to Liverpool Chads, Fearman joined Stoke Potters.

Fearman retired from racing at the end of 1961 although he had already begun promoting in 1960 with his club Stoke Potters in the newly formed Provincial League.

== Promoting and management career ==
Fearman promoted at multiple tracks from 1960 until his retirement in 1986, including Stoke, Liverpool, Wolverhampton, Middlesbrough, Newcastle and Halifax.

Fearman, along with fellow promoter Ron Wilson, brought back Long Eaton Archers in 1963 but moved the speedway licence to Leicester Stadium because of concerns over increased stock car events damaging the Long Eaton Stadium speedway track.

Fearman promoted the Reading Racers team for their inaugural season in 1968.

Fearman was chairman of the British Speedway Promoters' Association (BSPA) in 1973, 1974, 1975, 1976, 1979, 1983 and 1984. He had previously been the British League Division Two chairman from 1968 until 1972. He also had spells as national team manager for England, when they won the World Team Cup and the World Pairs Championship.
