= Long Eaton Speedway =

Defunct Long Eaton motorcycle speedway teams

Coordinates: 52°53′56″N 1°15′41″W

Club information
- Track address: Long Eaton Stadium; Station Road; Long Eaton; Derbyshire
- Country: England
- Founded: 1950
- Closed: 1997 (revived 2011–2016)

Club facts
- Colours: Red, white and blue
- Track size: 336 metres (367 yd)

Major team honours
National league champions	1984
Premier League fours	1997
Midland Development League	2011

Long Eaton motorcycle speedway teams operated from 1950 until 1997 in Long Eaton, England. Teams have raced at the Long Eaton Stadium as the Long Eaton Archers, Long Eaton Rangers, Nottingham Outlaws and the Long Eaton Invaders. The team briefly returned between 2011 and 2016 but raced in Leicester.

== History ==
=== Origins ===
In April 1929, it was announced that a speedway track under the supervision of F. Hatton, would be constructed inside the greyhound track at Long Eaton Stadium. The first meeting was held on 18 May 1929. The Derby Evening Telegraph described the oval circuit as having four laps to the mile, with straights 35 ft wide (11 m) and the bends 50 ft wide (15 m) 'to allow broadsiding at 60 mph'. After only two meetings the track required additional alterations and did not return to action until 26 October.

Only one meeting took place in 1930, with a special Nottingham versus Leicester fixture on 10 June.

=== 1950s ===
In the Summer of 1949 the Long Eaton Urban Council supported a new scheme to bring speedway back to the stadium. Mr S. Saunders and Arthur Sherlock, directors of Long Eaton Stadium Ltd., stated that facilities could be provided for 15,000 people and the team would be called the "Long Eaton Archers".

Racing returned to Long Eaton on 25 May 1950, with the team racing a series of challenge matches throughout the season. The Archers entered the league system for 1951 and competed in the 1951 Speedway National League Division Three. The following season, the Archers started in the 1952 Speedway Southern League but ran into financial difficulties, with MD Stan Lish needing to raise £1,000 to survive. They closed down after their 31 July fixture.

=== 1960s ===
Eleven years after the last speedway in Long Eaton the "Archers" name was again used when the track re-opened in 1963, with Reg Fearman entering the team in the Provincial League. The team finally completed two entire seasons in 1963 and 1964 before joining the new British League in 1965 but the team struggled in the league finishing last. The 1966 season started with signing of multiple world champion Ove Fundin and the emergence of Ray Wilson as a top rider but problems and a subsequent suspension of Fundin hampered the season. Fearman and fellow promoter Ron Wilson continued to attempt to make the Archers a leading team with the signings of Anders Michanek, Jim Lightfoot and John Boulger but results were not great again. Even worse ensued in 1968 when Wilson and Fearman moved the speedway licence to Leicester Stadium because of concerns over increased stock car events damaging the speedway track.

In 1969 a new promoter and former Leicester rider Ivor Brown re-opened the speedway with a new team name "Long Eaton Rangers", who competed in British League Division Two.

=== 1970s ===
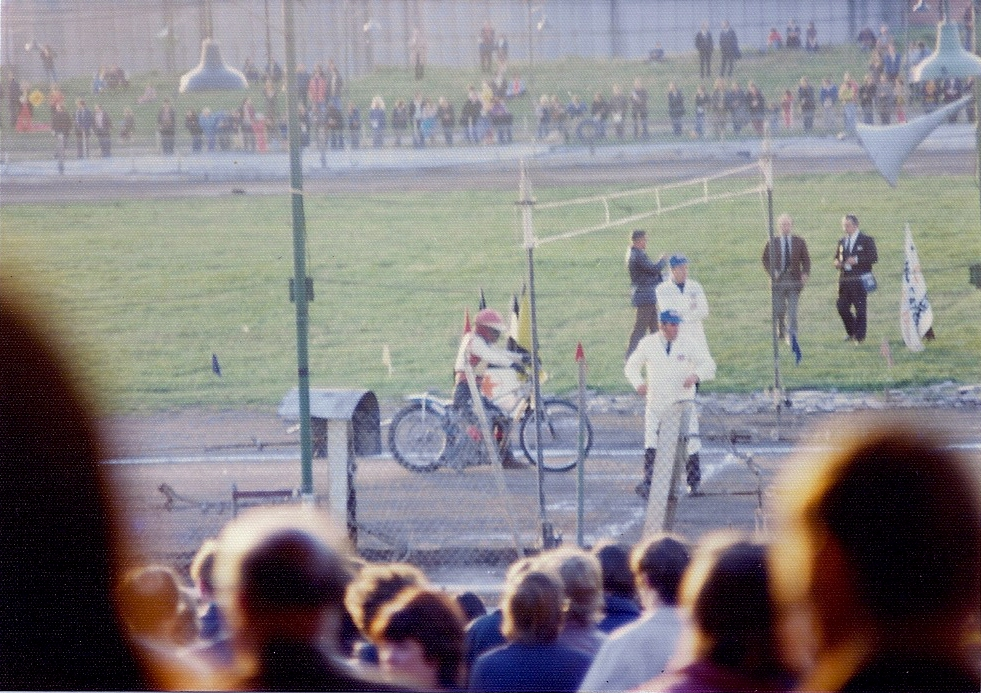
Long Eaton Archers 1974

Despite a solid finish the previous season, the Rangers finished last in 1970 despite the efforts of Malcolm Shakespeare. Slightly better years were experienced from 1971 to 1974 but still with little success. The team reverted to the Archers name in 1974 and number 1 rider Geoff Bouchard's riding provided the highlight of another moderate season. After the season the speedway ceased again, with co-promoter Tony Allsopp quoting poor attendances as the reason for the closure.

The track opened again in 1979 under the promotion of Dan McCormick and his decision to call the team the "Nottingham Outlaws" upset the supporters club. Dave Perks and Mike Sampson starred in their comeback season.

=== 1980s ===
The BSPA refused an application by promoter Maurice Jones to run during 1981 but another revival under Jones, John Turner and stadium leaseholder Keith Barber followed in 1982 as the team was again re-branded, but this time as the "Long Eaton Invaders" – the name was chosen due to the popularity of the Space Invaders arcade game at that time. Riders Alan Molyneux and Dave Perks both returned to the club but results remained poor and the Invaders finished last again in 1983.

In 1984, former rider Vic White was brought in as the team manager and he signed Graham Drury and Chris Pidcock to support Perks, Paul Stead and David Tyler. The Invaders transformed into a league winning side and clinched the club's first silverware by winning the National League title. From being league champions the team dramatically declined in 1985. In 1986, John Turner sold the promotion to Mervyn Porter and the Invaders suffered dreadful results for the remainder of the decade.

=== 1990s ===
A gradual improvement began in 1991 after the signing of Jan Stæchmann, who won the Riders' Championship the same year. In 1993 and 1994, the team finished runner-up, both times behind Glasgow Tigers and then found themselves in the merged Premier League for 1995 and 1996.

The Invaders wisely chose not to join the new Elite League in 1997, a decision which proved fruitful, after they won the fours championship, held on 3 August at the East of England Arena, during the 1997 Premier League speedway season. The team consisted of Carl Stonehewer, Martin Dixon, Brent Werner, Paul Lee and Justin Elkins.

In early 1998 it was announced that the stadium was to be sold (by receivers Grant Thornton, who had control of it since 1995) for housing development and the club would have to vacate immediately. The proposed development never took place.

=== Since 2000 ===
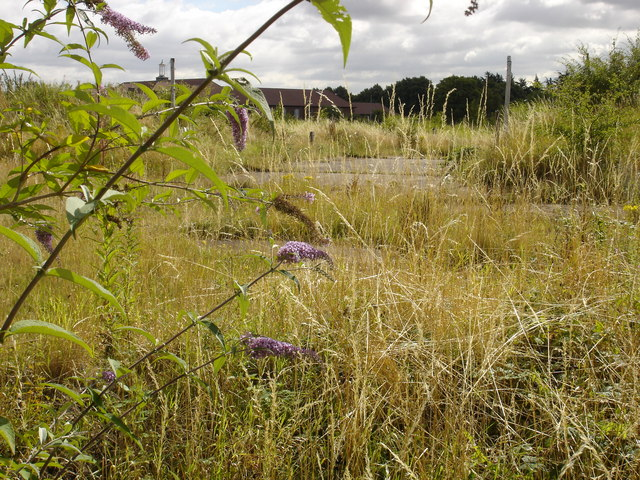
The site of Long Eaton Speedway Stadium in 2008

There was an unsuccessful attempt to reopen the site for speedway racing in 2005. The site was later approved for a residential development with public open spaces by Erewash Borough Council, and is now a housing estate.

The Long Eaton Invaders were revived in 2011, competing in the amateur status Midland League, sharing the Leicester Lions' new track in Beaumont Park Stadium for home matches. They ended the 2011 season as Midland League champions. They continued to compete in the junior leagues until 2016.

== Notable riders ==
- (England) Geoff Bouchard
- (England) Neil Collins
- (England) Martin Dixon
- (Wales) Graham Drury
- (Sweden) Ove Fundin
- (Sweden) Richard Hellsen
- (England) Alan Molyneux
- (England) Dave Perks
- (England) Mike Sampson
- (England) Malcolm Shakespeare
- (Denmark) Jan Stæchmann
- (England) Carl Stonehewer
- (United States) Brent Werner
- (England) Ray Wilson

== Season summary ==
Extended content

Year and league	Position	Notes
1951 Speedway National League Division Three	9th	Archers
1952 Speedway Southern League	N/A	Archers - withdrew, results expunged
1963 Provincial Speedway League	12th	Archers
1964 Provincial Speedway League	11th	Archers
1965 British League season	18th	Archers
1966 British League season	18th	Archers
1967 British League season	17th	Archers
1969 British League Division Two season	10th	Rangers
1970 British League Division Two season	17th	Rangers
1971 British League Division Two season	10th	Rangers
1972 British League Division Two season	16th	Rangers
1973 British League Division Two season	9th	Rangers
1974 British League Division Two season	15th	Archers
1979 National League season	14th	Nottingham Outlaws
1980 National League season	14th	Nottingham Outlaws
1982 National League season	7th	Invaders
1983 National League season	18th	Invaders
1984 National League season	1st	Invaders, champions
1985 National League season	18th	Invaders
1986 National League season	20th	Invaders
1987 National League season	15th	Invaders
1988 National League season	16th	Invaders
1989 National League season	17th	Invaders
1990 National League season	16th	Invaders
1991 British League Division Two season	6th	Invaders
1992 British League Division Two season	9th	Invaders
1993 British League Division Two season	2nd	Invaders
1994 British League Division Two season	2nd	Invaders
1995 Premier League speedway season	18th	Invaders
1996 Premier League speedway season	17th	Invaders
1997 Premier League speedway season	2nd	Invaders, Premier League Four-Team Championship winners
