= 1969 British League season =

British speedway season

- League: British League
- No. of competitors: 19
- Champions: Poole Pirates
- Knockout Cup: Wimbledon Dons
- Individual: Barry Briggs
- London Cup: Wimbledon Dons
- Midland Cup: Coventry Bees
- Highest average: Ivan Mauger
- Division/s below: British League (Div 2)

The 1969 British League season was the 35th season of the top tier of speedway in the United Kingdom and the fifth season known as the British League.

== Summary ==
The 19 competitors were the same as the previous season.

Poole Pirates won their first title. The Pirates were extremely consistent and despite their riders not coming in the top 18 league averages they won the league by a clear 6 points. Pete Smith was their top rider with an average of 9.34 but aided by four other riders (Geoff Mudge (9.05), Odd Fossengen (7.73), Bruce Cribb (7.31) and Gordon Guasco (7.26)) they were able to claim the title. Wimbledon Dons had a much better season than the last, finishing third and managed to retain their British League Knockout Cup crown. Belle Vue Aces finished runner-up, mainly due to the performances of their outstanding World champion rider Ivan Mauger; the New Zealander finished with an average of 11.67 and would also seal his second world title before the end of the season.

== Final table ==
Pos	Team	PL	W	D	L	Pts
1	Poole Pirates	36	26	1	9	53
2	Belle Vue Aces	36	23	1	12	47
3	Wimbledon Dons	36	22	2	12	46
4	Halifax Dukes	36	22	2	12	46
5	Leicester Lions	36	21	2	13	44
6	Sheffield Tigers	36	19	1	16	39
7	Cradley Heath Heathens	36	18	2	16	38
8	Glasgow Tigers	36	17	3	16	37
9	King's Lynn Stars	36	18	0	18	36
10	Swindon Robins	36	18	0	18	36
11	Coatbridge Monarchs	36	17	1	18	35
12	Exeter Falcons	36	16	0	20	32
13	Newcastle Diamonds	36	15	2	19	32
14	Coventry Bees	36	14	3	19	31
15	Oxford Cheetahs	36	15	1	20	31
16	Wolverhampton Wolves	36	13	1	22	27
17	Newport Wasps	36	13	1	22	27
18	West Ham Hammers	36	11	3	22	25
19	Hackney Hawks	36	10	2	24	22

M = Matches; W = Wins; D = Draws; L = Losses; Pts = Total Points

== Fixtures and results ==
Home \ Away	BV	CRA	CM	COV	EX	GLA	HAC	HAL	KL	LEI	ND	NW	OX	PP	SHE	SWI	WH	WIM	WOL
Belle Vue		40–38	52–26	44–33	50–28	43–35	56–22	50–28	54–24	52–26	47–30	53–25	44–34	47–31	44–34	47–31	47–31	55–23	40–38
Cradley	37–41		49–29	45–33	41–37	46–32	49–28	45–32	41–37	39–39	50–28	42–35	41–37	44–33	42–36	45–33	40–38	40–37	42–36
Coatbridge	33–45	42–36		46–32	40–38	49–29	50–28	37–41	43–35	41–37	39–39	53–25	49–29	40–38	44–34	40–38	43–35	47–31	52–26
Coventry	39–39	41–37	48–30		46–32	43–35	51–27	40–38	38–40	40–37	42–36	56–22	60–18	43–35	39–39	38–39	48–30	39–39	48–30
Exeter	40–38	51–27	50–28	44–34		51–27	51–27	43–35	45–33	38–40	40–38	43–35	48–30	38–40	40–38	38–39	44–33	42–36	44–33
Glasgow	45–33	39–39	46–32	42–36	46–32		52–25	37–41	49–29	44–34	54–24	52–26	42–35	39–39	44–33	42–36	52–26	45–33	48–30
Hackney	32–46	47–31	44–34	41–37	40–38	39–38		44–34	37–41	38–40	36–42	47–30	40–38	37–41	42–36	36–42	39–39	42–36	39–39
Halifax	40–38	49–29	49–29	41–37	47–31	47–31	54–24		48–30	44–34	58–20	58–20	58–20	48–30	46–32	50–28	60–18	47–31	45–33
King's Lynn	44–34	42–36	43–35	41–37	49–29	43–34	48–29	41–37		44–34	39–38	49–29	52–26	50–28	35–42	44–34	40–38	38–40	57–21
Leicester	43–35	40–38	44–34	42–35	46–32	47–31	53–25	49–29	40–38		49–29	52–26	54–24	47–31	46–32	48–30	38–40	37–41	58–20
Newcastle	38–39	53–25	41–37	51–26	47–31	41–37	44–34	39–39	46–32	36–42		44–33	56–21	36–41	43–35	44–34	42–36	41–37	41–36
Newport	42–36	46–32	35–43	43–35	36–42	43–35	45–33	48–30	41–36	39–39	51–26		51–27	32–46	47–31	41–37	40–37	36–42	44–34
Oxford	44–34	a–a+	48–30	46–32	46–32	46–32	50–28	a–a+	50–28	38–39	52–26	47–31		38–40	47–31	45–33	43–35	39–39	42–36
Poole	48–29	58–20	42–36	41.5–36.5	43–34	46–32	57–21	44–34	40–38	46–32	44–34	49–29	51–27		51–27	48–29	55–23	43–35	44–34
Sheffield	42–36	52–26	42–36	48–30	47–31	53–25	48–30	40–38	42–36	46–32	53–25	46–32	46–32	50–28		46–32	44–32	45–33	58–20
Swindon	40–36	42–35	38–40	40–38	46–32	35–43	40–38	43–34	41–37	40–38	45–32	54–24	49–29	37–41	40–38		57–20	40–37	43–35
West Ham	38–40	44–34	40–38	32–46	47–31	39–39	41–37	39–39	41–37	41–37	43–35	43–35	38–40	37–41	41–37	40–38		38–40	29–49
Wimbledon	44–34	54–24	47–31	48–30	47–30	48–30	57–20	54–24	52–26	45–33	46–32	62–16	52–26	42–36	49.5–28.5	46–32	59–19		56–22
Wolverhampton	43–35	32–46	44–34	45–33	50–28	38–40	45–33	36–41	41–37	31–47	47–31	55–23	34–44	29–49	42–36	43–35	43–35	41–37	

Legend: Blue = home team win; Yellow = draw; Red = away team win.

+ match awarded to away team

== Top ten riders (league only) ==
	Rider	Nat	Team	C.M.A.
1	Ivan Mauger	(New Zealand)	Belle Vue	11.45
2	Barry Briggs	(New Zealand)	Swindon	11.09
3	Eric Boocock	(England)	Halifax	10.88
4	Nigel Boocock	(England)	Coventry	10.77
5	Ray Wilson	(England)	Leicester	10.48
6	Norman Hunter	(England)	Wolverhampton	10.44
7	Trevor Hedge	(England)	Wimbledon	10.17
8	Ole Olsen	(Denmark)	Newcastle	10.08
9	Jim McMillan	(Scotland)	Glasgow	9.97
10	Martin Ashby	(England)	Exeter	9.96

== British League Knockout Cup ==
The 1969 British League Knockout Cup was the 31st edition of the Knockout Cup for tier one teams. Wimbledon were the winners.

First round

Date	Team one	Score	Team two
10/05	Coatbridge	53–25	Hackney
06/05	Leicester	54–24	Newport
06/05	West Ham	39–39	Kings Lynn
31/05	Kings Lynn	39–39	West Ham
17/06	West Ham	36–42	Kings Lynn

Second round

Date	Team one	Score	Team two
10/07	Sheffield	52–26	Kings Lynn
17/06	West Ham	36–42	Oxford
14/06	Canterbury	51–26	Crayford
14/06	Coventry	46–32	Oxford
14/06	Cradley Heath	41–37	Glasgow
11/06	Poole	43–35	Coatbridge
09/06	Exeter	36–42	Wimbledon
09/06	Newcastle	36–42	Belle Vue
07/06	Halifax	43–35	Wolverhampton

Quarter-finals

Date	Team one	Score	Team two
02/08	Belle Vue	38–40	Sheffield
31/07	Wimbledon	49–29	Poole
21/07	Cradley Heath	41–37	Swindon
05/07	Halifax	47–31	Coventry

Semi-finals

Date	Team one	Score	Team two
27/09	Cradley Heath	36–42	Wimbledon
21/08	Sheffield	43.5-34.5	Halifax

Final

First leg

8 October 1969

Sheffield Tigers Arnie Haley 11 Jim Airey 9 Billy Bales 9 John Dews 5 Dave Baugh 3 Bengt Larsson 2 Reg Wilson 1	40–38	Wimbledon Dons Trevor Hedge 12 Cyril Maidment 10 Reg Luckhurst 8 Ronnie Moore 4 Jim Tebby 3 Bob Dugard 1 Gary Everett 0

Owlerton Stadium

Second leg

9 October 1969

Wimbledon Dons Trevor Hedge 12 Ronnie Moore 12 Reg Luckhurst 9 Jim Tebby 7 Cyril Maidment 6 Bob Dugard 6 Gary Everett 4	56–22	Sheffield Tigers Arnie Haley 9 Jim Airey 9 Bengt Larsson 3 Billy Bales 1 John Dews 0 Dave Baugh 0 Reg Wilson 0

Wimbledon Stadium

Wimbledon Dons were declared Knockout Cup Champions, winning on aggregate 94-62.

== Riders' Championship ==
Barry Briggs won the British League Riders' Championship for the fifth consecutive year, held at Hyde Road on 18 October.

Pos.	Rider	Heat Scores	Total
1	(New Zealand) Barry Briggs	3 3 3 3 2	14
2	(New Zealand) Ivan Mauger	3 3 3 ef 3	12
3	(England) Jim Airey	1 2 3 3 3	12
4	(England) Martin Ashby	1 3 2 3 2	11
5	(England) Eric Boocock	3 2 1 2 2	10
6	(England) Roy Trigg	2 2 2 2 1	9
7	(England) Ray Wilson	0 3 3 2 f	8
8	(England) Trevor Hedge	2 1 2 2 1	8
9	(Hungary) Sándor Lévai	3 0 1 1 2	7
10	(England) Tony Clarke	2 2 0 1 1	6
11	(Denmark) Ole Olsen	ex ef ef 3 3	6
12	(England) Terry Betts	0 0 1 1 3	5
13	(Norway) Reidar Eide	1 1 2 1 0	5
14	(Scotland) Jim McMillan	2 1 0 0 0	3
15	(England) Colin Gooddy	1 0 1 0 r	2
16	(England) Pete Smith	0 1 0 0 1	2
17	(England) James Bond	0	0

- ef=engine failure, f=fell, exc=excluded

== Final leading averages ==
	Rider	Nat	Team	C.M.A.
1	Ivan Mauger	(New Zealand)	Belle Vue	11.67
2	Barry Briggs	(New Zealand)	Swindon	11.12
3	Eric Boocock	(England)	Halifax	11.08
4	Nigel Boocock	(England)	Coventry	10.78
5	Ray Wilson	(England)	Leicester	10.56
6	Ole Olsen	(Denmark)	Newcastle	10.39
7	Norman Hunter	(England)	Wolverhampton	10.35
8	Trevor Hedge	(England)	Wimbledon	10.33
9	Sören Sjösten	(Sweden)	Belle Vue	10.09
10	Reidar Eide	(Norway)	Coatbridge	10.01
11	Jim McMillan	(Scotland)	Glasgow	10.01
12	Martin Ashby	(England)	Exeter	9.97
13	Jim Airey	(England)	Sheffield	9.90
14	Ronnie Moore	(New Zealand)	Wimbledon	9.74
15	Charlie Monk	(Australia)	Glasgow	9.56
16	Reg Luckhurst	(England)	Wimbledon	9.39
17	Dave Younghusband	(England)	Halifax	9.38
18	Terry Betts	(England)	King's Lynn	9.35
19	Pete Smith	(England)	Poole	9.34
20	Roy Trigg	(England)	Cradley Heath	9.27

== London Cup ==
Wimbledon retained the London Cup.

Pos	Team	P	W	D	L	F	A	Pts
1	Wimbledon Dons	4	4	0	0	190	121	8
2	West Ham Hammers	4	1	0	3	154	157	2
3	Hackney Hawks	4	1	0	3	122	188	2

Home \ Away	HAC	WH	WIM
Hackney		40–37	30–47
West Ham	48–30		35–43
Wimbledon	56–22	44–34	

Legend: Blue = home team win; Yellow = draw; Red = away team win.

== Midland Cup ==
Coventry won the Midland Cup, which consisted of six teams.

First round

Team one	Team two	Score
Leicester	Wolverhampton	43–35, 38–40
Oxford	Cradley	39–39, 32–45

Semi final round

Team one	Team two	Score
Cradley	Coventry	37–41, 31–47
Leicester	Swindon	44.5–33.5, 40–38

Final

First leg

7 October 1969

Leicester John Boulger 10 Ray Wilson 7 Graham Plant 7 John Hart 5 Norman Storer 5 Malcolm Brown 5 Dene Davies 1	40–38	Coventry Nigel Boocock 15 Rick France 12 Col Cottrell 6 Roger Hill 5 Les Owen 0 Tony Lomas 0 Antonin Kasper r/r

Leicester Stadium

Second leg

11 October 1969

Coventry Rick France 12 Ken McKinlay (guest) 10 Col Cottrell 9 Tony Lomas 9 Les Owen 3 Roger Hill 1 Antonin Kasper r/r	44–34	Leicester Ray Wilson 10 Malcolm Brown 10 John Boulger 6 Graham Plant 3 John Hart 3 Dene Davies 2 Norman Storer 0

Brandon Stadium
Attendance: 14,000

Coventry won on aggregate 82–74

== Riders & final averages ==
Belle Vue

- (New Zealand) Ivan Mauger 11.67
- (Sweden) Sören Sjösten 10.09
- (England) Tommy Roper 8.58
- (England) Chris Pusey 6.41
- (England) Steve Waplington 5.92
- (England) Dave Hemus 4.60
- (England) Norman Nevitt 4.33
- (England) Bill Powell 4.30
- (England) Ken Eyre 4.14
- (England) Eric Broadbelt 3.84
- (England) Ken Moss 3.56
- (New Zealand) Bill Moulin 3.24

Coatbridge

- (Norway) Reidar Eide 10.01
- (Scotland) Bert Harkins 7.94
- (Scotland) George Hunter 7.14
- (New Zealand) Wayne Briggs 6.39
- (Scotland) Brian Collins 5.93
- (Scotland) Doug Templeton 5.17
- (Scotland) Alec Hughson 4.24
- (Scotland) Alistair Brady 3.82

Coventry

- (England) Nigel Boocock 10.78
- (Czech Republic) Antonín Kasper Sr. 7.55
- (England) Col Cottrell 7.36
- (England) Roger Hill 6.81
- (England) Rick France 6.67
- (England) Tom Ridley 5.54
- (England) Les Owen 5.41
- (England) John Harrhy 4.83
- (England) Tony Lomas 4.74
- (England) Dave Callington 3.28

Cradley Heath

- (England) Roy Trigg 9.27
- (Sweden) Bernt Persson 9.11
- (England) Bob Andrews 7.93
- (England) Chris Bass 5.29
- (New Zealand) Graham Coombes 4.90
- (England) Mike Gardner 4.31
- (England) Ken Wakefield 4.15
- (England) Chris Hawkins 1.29

Exeter

- (England) Martin Ashby 9.97
- (Czech Republic) Jan Holub I 8.12
- (England) Jimmy Squibb 7.31
- (England) Alan Cowland 5.22
- (England) Mike Cake 5.15
- (Canada) Chris Blewett 4.95
- (England) Tim Bungay 4.75
- (Scotland) Ross Gilbertson 4.55
- (England) Phil Woodcock 4.27

Glasgow

- (Scotland) Jimmy McMillan 10.01
- (Australia) Charlie Monk 9.56
- (Norway) Oyvind Berg 8.09
- (England) Russ Dent 5.61
- (Scotland) Willie Templeton 5.01
- (New Zealand) Alf Wells 4.25
- (England) Mike Hiftle 3.41
- (Scotland) Bobby Beaton 2.91

Hackney

- (England) Colin Pratt 7.35
- (Australia) Garry Middleton 7.05
- (Australia) Jack Biggs 6.33
- (England) Jimmy Gooch 6.17
- (England) Les McGillivray 5.45
- (England) Laurie Etheridge 5.10
- (England) Brian Leonard 5.03
- (England) Des Lukehurst 4.88
- (England) Tommy Sweetman 4.50
- (New Zealand) Graeme Smith 3.10

Halifax

- (England) Eric Boocock 11.08
- (England) Dave Younghusband 9.38
- (Australia) Greg Kentwell 7.67
- (England) Alan Jay 7.16
- (Australia) Dennis Gavros 6.23
- (Australia) Les Sharpe 5.33
- (England) Terry Lee 4.00
- (Australia) Bob Jameson 3.76

King's Lynn

- (England) Terry Betts 9.35
- (England) Malcolm Simmons 8.14
- (Wales) Howard Cole (Kid Bodie) 7.72
- (England) Clive Featherby 6.44
- (New Zealand) Allan Brown 4.95
- (England) Alan Bellham 4.89
- (Australia) Peter Bradshaw 4.19

Leicester

- (England) Ray Wilson 10.56
- (Australia) John Boulger 8.76
- (England) John Hart 6.47
- (England) Norman Storer 6.44
- (England) Graham Plant 6.21
- (England) Malcolm Brown 5.16
- (United States) DeWayne Keeter 4.88

Newcastle

- (Denmark) Ole Olsen 10.39
- (New Zealand) Dave Gifford 7.34
- (New Zealand) Gary Peterson 4.80
- (England) Mike Watkin 4.63
- (Norway) Helge Langli 4.27
- (England) Alan Knapkin 4.00
- (England) Dave Schofield 3.47
- (New Zealand) Murray Burt 3.23

Newport

- (Hungary) Sandor Levai 8.34
- (England) Norman Strachan 6.29
- (England) Chris Julian 6.06
- (England) Alby Golden 5.95
- (Wales) Bob Hughes 5.92
- (England) Jon Erskine 5.83
- (Wales) Cyril Francis 4.67
- (New Zealand) Terry Shearer 3.74
- (Norway) Einar Egedius 2.73

Oxford

- (England) Eddie Reeves 8.08
- (England) Colin Gooddy 8.03
- (Wales) Leo McAuliffe 7.24
- (England) Pete Jarman 7.00
- (New Zealand) Rick Timmo 6.65
- (England) George Major 5.27
- (Sweden) Conny Samuelsson 4.17
- (England) Mick Bell 4.00
- (England) David Crane 4.00
- (England) John Bishop 3.61

Poole

- (England) Pete Smith 9.34
- (Australia) Geoff Mudge 9.05
- (Norway) Odd Fossengen 7.73
- (New Zealand) Bruce Cribb 7.31
- (Australia) Gordon Guasco 7.26
- (New Zealand) Frank Shuter 5.55
- (Poland) Ted Laessing 4.50

Sheffield

- (Australia) Jim Airey 9.90
- (England) Arnold Haley 8.62
- (Sweden) Bengt Larsson 8.43
- (England) Bob Paulson 6.00
- (England) Brian Maxted 5.85
- (England) John Dews 5.59
- (England) Billy Bales 5.42
- (England) Dave Baugh 3.80
- (England) Reg Wilson 0.50

Swindon

- (New Zealand) Barry Briggs 11.12
- (England) Bob Kilby 7.78
- (England) Mike Keen 6.71
- (England) Mike Broadbank 6.13
- (England) Clive Hitch 5.43
- (England) Pete Munday 4.87
- (England) Barry Duke 4.76
- (England) Mac Woolford 2.04

West Ham

- (Norway) Sverre Harrfeldt 9.78
- (England) Tony Clarke 8.49
- (Sweden) Olle Nygren 7.91
- (Scotland) Ken McKinlay 7.69
- (England) Stan Stevens 5.30
- (Australia) John Langfield 5.03
- (England) Barry Crowson 4.07
- (England) Martyn Piddock 3.63
- (Denmark) Bent Nørregaard 3.62
- (England) George Barclay 2.20
- (England) Brian Leonard 1.87

Wimbledon

- (England) Trevor Hedge 10.33
- (New Zealand) Ronnie Moore 9.74
- (England) Reg Luckhurst 9.39
- (England) Cyril Maidment 6.56
- (England) Bob Dugard 6.34
- (England) Jim Tebby 6.10
- (England) Gary Everett 5.57
- (England) Peter Murray 3.30

Wolverhampton

- (England) Norman Hunter 10.35
- (England) James Bond 7.38
- (Netherlands) Peter Vandenberg 7.27
- (England) Geoff Ambrose 6.11
- (England) Mick Handley 5.98
- (England) Tommy Sweetman 5.70
- (Sweden) Bengt Andersson 5.22
- (England) Peter Jackson 3.76
- (Wales) Cyril Francis 3.26

== See also ==
- List of United Kingdom Speedway League Champions
- Knockout Cup (speedway)
