= 1968 British League season =

British speedway season

- League: British League
- Season: 1968
- No. of competitors: 19
- Champions: Coventry Bees
- Knockout Cup: Wimbledon Dons
- Individual: Barry Briggs
- London Cup: Wimbledon Dons
- Midland Cup: Swindon Robins
- Highest average: Ivan Mauger
- Division/s below: British League (Div 2)

The 1968 British League season was the 34th season of the top tier of speedway in the United Kingdom and the fourth season known as the British League.

== Summary ==
Edinburgh relocated to become the Coatbridge Monarchs. The Long Eaton team closed its doors, but a new team in Leicester returned to speedway to join the League. Long Eaton promoters Ron Wilson and Reg Fearman moved the speedway licence to Leicester Stadium because of concerns over increased stock car events damaging the Long Eaton Stadium speedway track.

Coventry Bees secured their first title on points difference and after they scored points in the last heat of their last match away at King's Lynn. The title win came after two consecutive years as being runner-up. Coventry's Nigel Boocock was again one of the league's leading riders with his average going well above ten for the fifth consecutive year. He was well supported by Ron Mountford and Czechoslovak star Antonín Kasper Sr. Wimbledon Dons who could only manage a mid table finish went on to win the British League Knockout Cup.

== Final table ==
| | | M | W | D | L | F | A | Pts |
|---|---|---|---|---|---|---|---|---|
| 1 | Coventry Bees | 36 | 22 | 0 | 14 | 1436 | 1369 | 44 |
| 2 | Hackney Hawks | 36 | 21 | 2 | 13 | 1421 | 1383 | 44 |
| 3 | Exeter Falcons | 36 | 20 | 1 | 15 | 1556.5 | 1248.5 | 41 |
| 4 | Sheffield Tigers | 36 | 20 | 1 | 15 | 1463.5 | 1337.5 | 41 |
| 5 | Newcastle Diamonds | 36 | 20 | 0 | 16 | 1454 | 1350 | 40 |
| 6 | West Ham Hammers | 36 | 19 | 1 | 16 | 1454 | 1348 | 39 |
| 7 | Halifax Dukes | 36 | 19 | 1 | 16 | 1424 | 1379 | 39 |
| 8 | Coatbridge Monarchs | 36 | 18 | 1 | 17 | 1404 | 1397 | 37 |
| 9 | Wimbledon Dons | 36 | 18 | 0 | 18 | 1411 | 1384 | 36 |
| 10 | Belle Vue Aces | 36 | 18 | 0 | 18 | 1387 | 1417 | 36 |
| 11 | Swindon Robins | 36 | 17 | 1 | 18 | 1448 | 1353 | 35 |
| 12 | Leicester Lions | 36 | 17 | 1 | 18 | 1373 | 1430 | 35 |
| 13 | Newport Wasps | 36 | 17 | 1 | 18 | 1348 | 1457 | 35 |
| 14 | Cradley Heath Heathens | 36 | 15 | 4 | 17 | 1373 | 1430 | 34 |
| 15 | Oxford Cheetahs | 36 | 17 | 0 | 19 | 1319 | 1487 | 34 |
| 16 | Wolverhampton Wolves | 36 | 16 | 0 | 20 | 1388 | 1413 | 32 |
| 17 | Poole Pirates | 36 | 13 | 2 | 21 | 1327 | 1478 | 28 |
| 18 | King's Lynn Stars | 36 | 13 | 1 | 22 | 1330 | 1473 | 27 |
| 19 | Glasgow Tigers | 36 | 13 | 1 | 22 | 1312 | 1495 | 27 |

M = Matches; W = Wins; D = Draws; L = Losses; Pts = Total Points

== Fixtures & results ==
| Home \ Away | BV | CM | COV | CH | EX | GLA | HAC | HAL | KL | LE | ND | NW | OX | PP | SHE | SWI | WH | WIM | WOL |
|---|---|---|---|---|---|---|---|---|---|---|---|---|---|---|---|---|---|---|---|
| Belle Vue Aces | | 41–37 | 55–23 | 47–31 | 34–44 | 50–28 | 45–33 | 49–29 | 40–38 | 40–38 | 41–37 | 51–27 | 52–26 | 45–33 | 37–41 | 55–23 | 44–34 | 52–26 | 41–37 |
| Coatbridge Monarchs | 41–36 | | 38–40 | 51–27 | 39–39 | 48–30 | 53–25 | 52–26 | 49–29 | 43–35 | 46–32 | 48–30 | 54–24 | 44–34 | 42–36 | 43–35 | 48–30 | 46–32 | 53–23 |
| Coventry Bees | 37–41 | 47–31 | | 53–25 | 43–35 | 48–30 | 41–36 | 46–32 | 47–31 | 45–33 | 43–35 | 46–32 | 56–22 | 49–29 | 44–34 | 43–35 | 42–36 | 50–28 | 45–33 |
| Cradley Heathens | 45–33 | 54–24 | 37–41 | | 42–36 | 53–25 | 46–32 | 37–41 | 46–32 | 36–42 | 38–40 | 42–36 | 50–28 | 43–35 | 42–35 | 39–39 | 40–38 | 44–34 | 49–29 |
| Exeter Falcons | 46–31 | 53–25 | 51–27 | 53–25 | | 50–28 | 51–27 | 58–19 | 59–19 | 56–22 | 47–31 | 53–25 | 50–28 | 52–26 | 50–28 | 49–29 | 41–37 | 49–29 | 51–27 |
| Glasgow Tigers | 44–34 | 38–40 | 47–31 | 39–39 | 36–42 | | 36–42 | 34–44 | 44–34 | 47–31 | 41–37 | 55–23 | 49–29 | 46–32 | 38–40 | 43–35 | 31–47 | 40–38 | 49–29 |
| Hackney Hawks | 48–30 | 40–36 | 42–36 | 43–35 | 43–35 | 47–31 | | 46–32 | 41–37 | 43–35 | 42–36 | 48–30 | 46–32 | 47–31 | 42–35 | 47–31 | 42–36 | 52–26 | 42–36 |
| Halifax Dukes | 52–26 | 51–27 | 42–36 | 56–22 | 43–35 | 50–27 | 54–24 | | 44–34 | 47–31 | 40–38 | 47–31 | 52–26 | 42–36 | 39–39 | 45–33 | 43–35 | 50–28 | 49–29 |
| King's Lynn Stars | 41–37 | 50–28 | 37–41 | 39–39 | 45–33 | 36–42 | 36–42 | 43–35 | | 41–37 | 41–37 | 40–38 | 48–30 | 50–28 | 49–29 | 42–36 | 38–40 | 47–26 | 40–38 |
| Leicester Lions | 44–34 | 40–38 | 37–41 | 50–27 | 40–38 | 43–35 | 39–39 | 41–37 | 48–30 | | 44–34 | 51–27 | 44–34 | 41–37 | 39–37 | 45–33 | 41–37 | 43–35 | 40–38 |
| Newcastle Diamonds | 59–19 | 48–30 | 52–26 | 40–38 | 50–28 | 45–33 | 46–32 | 50–28 | 40–38 | 40–38 | | 53–25 | 41–37 | 43–35 | 46–32 | 46–32 | 49–29 | 49–28 | 40–38 |
| Newport Wasps | 46–32 | 43–35 | 42–36 | 47–31 | 41–37 | 49–29 | 46–32 | 45–33 | 42–36 | 44–33 | 51–27 | | 53–25 | 48–29 | 49–29 | 47–31 | 39–39 | 46–32 | 45–33 |
| Oxford Cheetahs | 43–35 | 43–35 | 41–37 | 30–47 | 43–35 | 42–36 | 45–33 | 51–26 | 43–35 | 43–35 | 41–37 | 54–24 | | 42–36 | 42–36 | 38–40 | 46–32 | 43–35 | 44–34 |
| Poole Pirates | 36–42 | 38–40 | 43–35 | 39–39 | 40–38 | 45–33 | 39–39 | 42–36 | 45–33 | 43–35 | 44–34 | 43–35 | 49–29 | | 43–35 | 38–40 | 41–37 | 45–32 | 42–36 |
| Sheffield Tigers | 54–24 | 46–32 | 51–27 | 53–25 | 44.5–33.5 | 51–27 | 43–35 | 42–36 | 51–27 | 45–33 | 50–27 | 51–27 | 49–29 | 51–27 | | 50–28 | 41–37 | 50–28 | 44–34 |
| Swindon Robins | 56–22 | 57–20 | 43–34 | 36–42 | 50–28 | 61–17 | 36–42 | 48–30 | 51–27 | 43–35 | 38–39 | 54–24 | 45–33 | 53–24 | 47–31 | | 36–42 | 39–38 | 46–32 |
| West Ham Hammers | 41–36 | 43–35 | 46–32 | 39–38 | 48–30 | 36–42 | 41–37 | 42–35 | 48–30 | 50–28 | 44–34 | 50–28 | 41–37 | 45–33 | 48–29 | 37–40 | | 43–35 | 52–25 |
| Wimbledon Dons | 54–24 | 51–26 | 54–24 | 42–36 | 50–28 | 49–29 | 46–32 | 42–35 | 49–29 | 47–31 | 46–31 | 49–29 | 37–41 | 41–37 | 55–22 | 43–34 | 41–37 | | 41–37 |
| Wolverhampton Wolves | 45–32 | 51–27 | 33–44 | 45–33 | 43–35 | 45–33 | 40–38 | 54–24 | 50–28 | 46–31 | 47–31 | 43–34 | 43–35 | 48–30 | 49–29 | 43–35 | 41–37 | 34–44 | |

Legend: Blue = home team win; Yellow = draw; Red = away team win.

== Top Ten Riders (League averages) ==
| | Rider | Nat | Team | C.M.A. |
|---|---|---|---|---|
| 1 | Ivan Mauger | (New Zealand) | Newcastle | 11.40 |
| 2 | Barry Briggs | (New Zealand) | Swindon | 10.88 |
| 3 | Nigel Boocock | (England) | Coventry | 10.79 |
| 4 | Martin Ashby | (England) | Exeter | 10.68 |
| 5 | Charlie Monk | (Australia) | Sheffield | 10.14 |
| 6 | Eric Boocock | (England) | Halifax | 10.13 |
| 7 | Anders Michanek | (Sweden) | Leicester | 10.07 |
| 8 | Norman Hunter | (England) | West Ham | 9.94 |
| 9 | Sverre Harrfeldt | (Norway) | West Ham | 9.88 |
| 10 | Torbjörn Harrysson | (Sweden) | Newport | 9.82 |

== British League Knockout Cup ==
The 1968 British League Knockout Cup was the 30th edition of the Knockout Cup for tier one teams. Wimbledon were the winners.

First round

| Date | Team one | Score | Team two |
|---|---|---|---|
| 27/04 | Coatbridge | 66–42 | Glasgow |
| 27/04 | Halifax | 57–51 | Exeter |
| 16/04 | West Ham | 55–52 | Hackney |

Second round

| Date | Team one | Score | Team two |
|---|---|---|---|
| 01/06 | Belle Vue | 64–44 | West Ham |
| 14/05 | Leicester | 52–56 | Coventry |
| 20/05 | Newcastle | 77–30 | Coatbridge |
| 23/05 | Sheffield | 71–37 | Cradley Heath |
| 25/05 | Swindon | 58–50 | Oxford |
| 23/05 | Wimbledon | 60–48 | Kings Lynn |
| 22/05 | Poole | 56–52 | Newport |
| 17/05 | Wolverhampton | 60–47 | Halifax |

Third round

| Date | Team one | Score | Team two |
|---|---|---|---|
| 17/08 | Belle Vue | 65–42 | Sheffield |
| 26/07 | Poole | 54–54 | Swindon |
| 27/06 | Wimbledon | 64–44 | Newcastle |
| 28/06 | Wolverhampton | 58–50 | Coventry |
| 23/08 replay | Swindon | 60–47 | Poole |

Semi-finals

| Date | Team one | Score | Team two |
|---|---|---|---|
| 20/09 | Wolverhampton | 67–40 | Belle Vue |
| 12/09 | Wimbledon | 80–28 | Swindon |

=== Final ===
First leg

18 October 1968

| Wolverhampton Wolves Hasse Holmqvist 15 Jim Airey 14 Peter Vandenberg 8 James Bond 6 Dave Hemus 6 Doug White 3 Mick Handley 1 Pete Jarman 0 | 53–55 | Wimbledon Dons Olle Nygren 14 Trevor Hedge 12 Reg Luckhurst 10 Bob Dugard 9 Alan Cowland 4 Jim Tebby 3 Peter Murray 3 Garry Middleton 0 |

Monmore Green Stadium

Second leg

31 October 1968

| Wimbledon Dons Trevor Hedge 17 Olle Nygren 14 Reg Luckhurst 12 Garry Middleton 8 Alan Cowland 6 Bob Dugard 2 Jim Tebby 2 Peter Murray 2 | 63–45 | Wolverhampton Wolves Hasse Holmqvist 12 James Bond 10 Peter Vandenberg 8 Jim Airey 7 Mick Handley 5 Pete Jarman 3 Dave Hemus 0 Doug White 0 |

Wimbledon Stadium

Wimbledon Dons were declared Knockout Cup Champions, winning on aggregate 118-98.

== Riders' Championship ==
Barry Briggs won the British League Riders' Championship for the fourth consecutive year, held at Hyde Road on 19 October. Briggs defeated Boocock in a run off for the title.

| Pos. | Rider | Heat Scores | Total |
|---|---|---|---|
| 1 | (New Zealand) Barry Briggs | 3 3 3 2 3 | 14 |
| 2 | (England) Nigel Boocock | 3 3 3 3 2 | 14 |
| 3 | (New Zealand) Ivan Mauger | 2 3 3 3 2 | 13 |
| 4 | (Sweden) Torbjörn Harrysson | 3 2 3 3 f | 11 |
| 5 | (England) Martin Ashby | 3 2 2 1 3 | 11 |
| 6 | (England) Terry Betts | 1 2 1 3 1 | 8 |
| 7 | (Sweden) Sören Sjösten | 2 r 2 1 3 | 8 |
| 8 | (Sweden) Anders Michanek | 0 3 1 2 2 | 8 |
| 9 | (Sweden) Hasse Holmqvist | 2 1 1 2 1 | 7 |
| 10 | (Sweden) Bernt Persson | 1 1 2 2 1 | 7 |
| 11 | (Australia) Charlie Monk | 2 2 0 0 1 | 5 |
| 12 | (England) Norman Hunter | 1 1 ef 0 3 | 5 |
| 13 | (England) Nigel Boocock | ef 0 2 1 2 | 5 |
| 14 | (Sweden) Olle Nygren | 0 1 ef 1 0 | 2 |
| 15 | (England) Colin Pratt | 1 ef 1 0 0 | 2 |
| 16 | (England) Roy Trigg | ef ns 0 0 0 | 0 |

- ef=engine failure, f=fell, exc=excluded

== Final leading averages ==
| | Rider | Nat | Team | C.M.A. |
|---|---|---|---|---|
| 1 | Ivan Mauger | (New Zealand) | Newcastle | 11.37 |
| 2 | Barry Briggs | (New Zealand) | Swindon | 10.87 |
| 3 | Nigel Boocock | (England) | Coventry | 10.74 |
| 4 | Martin Ashby | (England) | Exeter | 10.72 |
| 5 | Anders Michanek | (Sweden) | Leicester | 10.19 |
| 6 | Eric Boocock | (England) | Halifax | 10.17 |
| 7 | Charlie Monk | (Australia) | Sheffield | 10.07 |
| 8 | Sverre Harrfeldt | (Norway) | West Ham | 9.78 |
| 9 | Torbjörn Harrysson | (Sweden) | Newport | 9.82 |
| 10 | Norman Hunter | (England) | West Ham | 9.71 |
| 11 | Ron Mountford | (England) | Coventry | 9.62 |
| 12 | Hasse Holmqvist | (Sweden) | Wolverhampton | 9.58 |
| 13 | Colin Pratt | (England) | Hackney | 9.58 |
| 14 | Terry Betts | (England) | King's Lynn | 9.45 |
| 15 | Malcolm Simmons | (England) | King's Lynn | 9.40 |
| 16 | Ole Olsen | (Denmark) | Newcastle | 9.39 |
| 17 | Ray Wilson | (England) | Leicester | 9.37 |
| 18 | Olle Nygren | (England) | Wimbledon | 9.39 |
| 19 | Bernt Persson | (Sweden) | Edinburgh | 9.28 |
| 20 | Jim Airey | (Australia) | Wolverhampton | 9.24 |

== London Cup ==
Wimbledon won the London Cup.

| Pos | Team | P | W | D | L | F | A | Pts |
|---|---|---|---|---|---|---|---|---|
| 1 | Wimbledon Dons | 4 | 3 | 0 | 1 | 233 | 198 | 6 |
| 2 | West Ham Hammers | 4 | 2 | 1 | 1 | 225 | 207 | 5 |
| 3 | Hackney Hawks | 4 | 0 | 1 | 3 | 189 | 242 | 1 |

| Home \ Away | HAC | WH | WIM |
|---|---|---|---|
| Hackney | | 54–54 | 42–66 |
| West Ham | 59–49 | | 60–48 |
| Wimbledon | 63–44 | 56–52 | |

Legend: Blue = home team win; Yellow = draw; Red = away team win.

== Midland Cup ==
Swindon won the Midland Cup for the second consecutive season. The competition consisted of six teams.

First round

| Team one | Team two | Score |
|---|---|---|
| Oxford | Wolverhampton | 42–36, 41–37 |
| Leicester | Cradley | 45–32, 41–37 |

Semi final round

| Team one | Team two | Score |
|---|---|---|
| Leicester | Cradley | 45–32, 36–42 |
| Swindon | Oxford | 46–32, 39–38 |

Final

First leg

5 October 1968

| Swindon Barry Briggs 11 Bob Kilby 10 Clive Hitch 6 Pete Munday 5 Frank Shuter 5 Mike Keen 5 Mike Broadbank 0 | 42–35 | Leicester Anders Michanek 10 John Boulger 9 Ray Wilson 9 John Hart 5 Graham Plant 2 George Major 0 Norman Storer 0 |

Abbey Stadium

Second leg

15 October 1968

| Leicester Ray Wilson 12 Anders Michanek 10 Norman Storer 6 John Boulger 6 John Hart 3 Graham Plant 3 George Major 2 | 42–36 | Swindon Barry Briggs 9 Frank Shuter 7 Clive Hitch 6 Mike Broadbank 6 Mike Keen 3 Bob Kilby 3 Pete Munday 2 |

Leicester Stadium

Swindon won on aggregate 78–77

== Riders and final averages ==
Belle Vue

- (Sweden) Sören Sjösten 9.13
- (England) Tommy Roper 8.50
- (Hungary) Sándor Lévai 7.40
- (England) Cyril Maidment 7.34
- (England) Bill Powell 5.62
- (England) Norman Nevitt 5.56
- (Wales) Taffy Owen 4.48
- (England) Ken Eyre 4.29
- (England) Chris Pusey 3.65
- (England) Eric Broadbelt 2.78

Coatbridge

- (Sweden) Bernt Persson 9.28
- (Norway) Reidar Eide 9.02
- (Scotland) George Hunter 6.48
- (Scotland) Bert Harkins 6.36
- (Scotland) Doug Templeton 6.05
- (Scotland) Brian Collins 4.39
- (Scotland) Alec Hughson 3.62

Coventry

- (England) Nigel Boocock 10.74
- (England) Ron Mountford 9.62
- (Czech Republic) Antonín Kasper Sr. 7.51
- (England) Col Cottrell 7.09
- (England) Les Owen 6.46
- (England) Rick France 6.13
- (England) Roger Hill 5.46
- (England) Tom Ridley 4.73
- (England) Chris Harrison 3.40
- (England) Dave Callington 1.88

Cradley Heath

- (England) Roy Trigg 8.91
- (England) Bob Andrews 7.70
- (New Zealand) Graham Coombes 6.71
- (England) Chris Julian 6.32
- (Sweden) Lars Jansson 6.20
- (England) Ivor Brown 5.67
- (Sweden) Tommy Bergqvist 5.02
- (England) Ken Wakefield 5.02
- (England) Archie Wilkinson 4.19
- (England) Peter Wrathall 3.62
- (England) Alan Totney 3.16

Exeter

- (England) Martin Ashby 10.72
- (New Zealand) Wayne Briggs 7.70
- (Australia) Neil Street 7.51
- (England) Jimmy Squibb 7.46
- (England) Tommy Sweetman 7.31
- (England) Mike Cake 6.37
- (Canada) Chris Blewett 5.71
- (England) Chris Bass 4.64

Glasgow

- (Scotland) Jimmy McMillan 8.31
- (Norway) Oyvind Berg 7.91
- (New Zealand) Alf Wells 7.43
- (Sweden) Bo Josefsson 6.79
- (England) Russ Dent 5.78
- (Sweden) Lars Jansson 5.68
- (Scotland) Willie Templeton 4.92
- (Scotland) Bill McMillan 4.79
- (Sweden) Åke Andersson 4.17
- (Australia) Brian Whaley 2.37

Hackney

- (England) Colin Pratt 9.58
- (Sweden) Bengt Jansson 8.99
- (England) Les McGillivray 6.74
- (England) Des Lukehurst 6.24
- (Australia) Jack Biggs 6.08
- (England) Malcolm Brown 5.31
- (England) Alan Jackson 4.40
- (England) Gary Everett 4.08
- (England) Laurie Etheridge 3.17

Halifax

- (England) Eric Boocock 10.17
- (England) Dave Younghusband 8.83
- (England) Eric Boothroyd 7.95
- (England) Alan Jay 6.27
- (Australia) Greg Kentwell 5.94
- (Australia) Dennis Gavros 5.43
- (Australia) Les Sharpe 3.88
- (Australia) Bob Jameson 3.75
- (England) Maury Robinson 3.69

King's Lynn

- (England) Terry Betts 9.45
- (England) Malcolm Simmons 9.40
- (England) Clive Featherby 6.11
- (Wales) Howard Cole (Kid Bodie) 5.94
- (England) Brian Davies 5.24
- (England) David Crane 5.10
- (England) Geoff Penniket 4.34
- (England) Alan Bellham 4.29
- (New Zealand) Allan Brown 4.00

Leicester

- (Sweden) Anders Michanek 10.19
- (England) Ray Wilson 9.37
- (Australia) John Boulger 6.62
- (England) George Major 5.51
- (England) John Hart 5.43
- (England) Norman Storer 5.24
- (England) Vic White 4.06
- (England) Graham Plant 2.80
- (England) Roger Mills 2.58

Newcastle'

- (New Zealand) Ivan Mauger 11.37
- (Denmark) Ole Olsen 9.39
- (New Zealand) Dave Gifford 6.86
- (England) Alan Butterfield 6.08
- (New Zealand) Goog Allan 5.76
- (England) Mike Watkin 5.48
- (New Zealand) Alf Wells 5.09
- (England) Alan Jay 5.05
- (Australia) Alan Paynter 3.67
- (New Zealand) Gary Peterson 3.56
- (New Zealand) Murray Burt 2.24

Newport

- (Sweden) Torbjörn Harrysson 9.73
- (England) Jimmy Gooch 7.97
- (England) Jon Erskine 6.56
- (England) Norman Strachan 6.47
- (Wales) Bob Hughes 6.26
- (Wales) Cyril Francis 5.69
- (England) Alby Golden 5.72
- (New Zealand) Terry Shearer 2.00

Oxford

- (England) Ronnie Genz 8.53
- (England) Eddie Reeves 7.32
- (England) Colin Gooddy 6.87
- (Wales) Leo McAuliffe 6.58
- (New Zealand) Rick Timmo 5.52
- (England) John Bishop 4.38
- (England) Peter Seaton 2.77

Poole

- (New Zealand) Bill Andrew 8.32
- (Australia) Geoff Mudge 7.67
- (England) Pete Smith 7.46
- (Norway) Odd Fossengen 6.94
- (New Zealand) Bruce Cribb 5.71
- (Poland) Ted Laessing 5.25
- (England) Maury Mattingley 5.14
- (England) Tim Bungay 4.53
- (England) Tony Lewis 4.36

Sheffield

- (Australia) Charlie Monk 10.07
- (Sweden) Bengt Larsson 7.97
- (England) Arnold Haley 7.54
- (England) Bob Paulson 6.79
- (England) John Dews 6.39
- (England) Brian Maxted 6.13
- (England) Billy Bales 4.76
- (England) Dave Baugh 1.49

Swindon

- (New Zealand) Barry Briggs 10.87
- (England) Mike Broadbank 8.51
- (England) Bob Kilby 8.20
- (England) Mike Keen 6.18
- (England) Clive Hitch 5.99
- (New Zealand) Frank Shuter 5.25
- (England) Pete Munday 4.94
- (England) Peter Jackson 4.29

West Ham

- (Norway) Sverre Harrfeldt 9.78
- (England) Norman Hunter 9.71
- (Scotland) Ken McKinlay 9.11
- (England) Brian Leonard 5.36
- (England) Tony Clarke 4.95
- (England) Stan Stevens 4.46
- (England) George Barclay 3.33
- (England) Barry Crowson 2.57

Wimbledon

- (Sweden) Olle Nygren 9.31
- (England) Trevor Hedge 9.15
- (England) Reg Luckhurst 7.93
- (Australia) Garry Middleton 5.87
- (England) Jim Tebby 5.61
- (England) Alan Cowland 5.49
- (England) Bob Dugard 5.18
- (England) Peter Murray 3.54

Wolverhampton

- (Sweden) Hasse Holmqvist 9.58
- (Australia) Jim Airey 9.24
- (Netherlands) Peter Vandenberg 7.68
- (England) James Bond 6.82
- (England) Pete Jarman 5.97
- (England) Dave Hemus 4.86
- (England) Mick Handley 4.30
- (Australia) Doug White 2.86
- (England) Geoff Ambrose 2.35
- (England) Dave Parry 2.29

== See also ==
- List of United Kingdom Speedway League Champions
- Knockout Cup (speedway)
