= 1972 British League season =

British speedway season

- League: British League
- No. of competitors: 18
- Champions: Belle Vue Aces
- Knockout Cup: Belle Vue Aces
- Individual: Ole Olsen
- Midland Cup: Leicester Lions
- Spring Gold Cup: Reading Racers
- Highest average: Ole Olsen
- Division/s below: British League (Div 2)

The 1972 British League season was the 38th season of the top tier of speedway in the United Kingdom and the eighth season of the British League.

== Summary ==
Ipswich Witches moved up from Division Two but London lost two clubs, when the Wembley Lions closed due to extra football fixtures and West Ham Hammers withrew during the early part of the season, reducing the league to eighteen teams.

Belle Vue Aces won their third consecutive title. Their team was littered with great riders including Ivan Mauger, Sören Sjösten and the young Peter Collins; they were backed up by the consistency of Chris Pusey, Eric Broadbelt, Alan Wilkinson and Ken Eyre, which led to a comfortable title win by a clear 12 points.

Oxford Cheetahs had a bizarre season when they were rebranded as Oxford Rebels following a takeover by a new consortium, which included former riders Bob Dugard and Danny Dunton, Dave Lanning and the famous musician Acker Bilk. The team under performed badly finishing 17th from 18 teams despite the new image. To make matters worse they signed a new Norwegian rider Svein Kaasa, who was quickly transferred to Glasgow following poor results. He died riding for Glasgow towards the end of the season (on 29 September) at Hampden Park. Kasa clipped Martin Ashby's bike in a race and hit the wooden fence receiving fatal injuries.

Leicester won the Midland Cup and Reading won the Spring Gold Cup. There was no London Cup due to there being only two teams following the demise of West Ham and Wembley.

== Final table ==
Pos	Team	PL	W	D	L	Pts
1	Belle Vue Aces	34	31	1	2	63
2	Reading Racers	34	25	1	8	51
3	King's Lynn Stars	34	24	3	7	51
4	Sheffield Tigers	34	23	3	8	49
5	Leicester Lions	34	17	5	12	39
6	Ipswich Witches	34	17	1	16	35
7	Poole Pirates	34	15	2	17	32
8	Hackney Hawks	34	16	0	18	32
9	Wolverhampton Wolves	34	16	0	18	30
10	Coventry Bees	34	14	2	18	28
11	Exeter Falcons	34	13	2	19	28
12	Halifax Dukes	34	13	2	19	28
13	Wimbledon Dons	34	14	0	20	26
14	Glasgow Tigers	34	12	2	20	25
15	Swindon Robins	34	12	1	21	25
16	Cradley Heath Heathens	34	11	3	20	25
17	Oxford Rebels	34	10	0	24	20
18	Newport Wasps	34	9	0	25	18

M = Matches; W = Wins; D = Draws; L = Losses; Pts = Total Points

== Fixtures and results ==
Home \ Away	BV	COV	CH	EX	GLA	HAC	HAL	IPS	KL	LEI	NW	OX	PP	RR	SHE	SWI	WIM	WOL
Belle Vue		47–30	47.5–30.5	59–19	46–32	53–25	56–21	57–21	43–35	52–26	56–22	55–22	51–27	53–25	48–30	45–33	55–23	50–28
Coventry	32–45		49–29	42–36	50–28	47–31	48–30	38–39	49–29	39–39	50–28	59–19	39–39	40–38	38–40	45–33	48–30	43–35
Cradley Heath	29–49	43–34		39–39	40–38	37–41	41–37	35–43	41–37	39–39	60–18	43–35	41–37	33–45	29–49	41–37	46–32	42–36
Exeter	38–40	49–29	51–27		41–37	52–26	35–43	51–27	39–39	38–40	44–34	46.5–31.5	40–38	41–37	35–43	46–32	50–28	42–36
Glasgow	34–44	45–33	39–39	42–35		43–35	45–33	43–35	38–40	39–39	56–22	43–35	51–27	37–41	28–50	43–35	51–27	53–25
Hackney	35–43	48–29	51–27	45–32	51–27		50–28	41–37	37–41	46–32	40–38	60–18	40–37	41–37	38–40	40–38	46–32	45–33
Halifax	39–39	41–37	49–29	42–36	47–30	42–36		37–41	37–41	44–34	40–38	47–31	40–38	41–37	39–39	44–34	44–34	38–40
Ipswich	36–42	44–34	51–27	38–40	45–32	41–36	45–33		39–39	38–40	52–26	43–34	41–36	38–40	31–47	49–29	56–22	41–37
King's Lynn	35–43	42–36	44–34	49–29	46–32	41–37	42–36	44–34		40–38	59–19	50–28	57–21	40–38	42–36	51–27	44–33	43–35
Leicester	38–40	47–31	41–37	44–34	44–34	48–30	46–32	50–28	42–36		42–36	44–34	49–29	39–39	38–40	45–33	47–31	44–34
Newport	31–46	38–40	36–42	40–38	46–32	43–35	41–37	37–41	24–54	41–37		48–29	37–41	32–46	30–48	42–36	42–36	50–28
Oxford	35–43	36–41	45–33	43–35	50–27	47–30	45–33	40–38	33–45	38–40	51–27		36–42	35–42	36–42	43–35	43–35	41–37
Poole	33–44	40–38	53–25	54–24	44–34	51–27	46–32	47–31	35–43	40–38	42–36	49–29		36–42	39–39	45–33	51–27	41–37
Reading	40–37	55–23	45–33	47–31	51–27	48–30	44–34	41–36	49–29	49–29	53–25	43–35	50–28		47–31	44–34	49–29	51–27
Sheffield	37–41	41–37	41–37	52–26	58–20	48–30	45–33	38–39	39–39	40–38	54–24	58–20	56–22	56–22		45–33	58–20	38–40
Swindon	36–42	47–30	42–36	48–30	45–33	38–40	54–24	41–37	44–34	39–39	46–32	43–35	50–28	34–44	38–40		45–33	46–32
Wimbledon	43–34	44–34	46–32	40–37	38–40	40–38	44–33	41–37	37–41	45–33	55–22	41–36	44–34	38–40	43–35	40–38		45–33
Wolverhampton	31–47	42–35	40–38	43–35	48–30	51–27	49–29	38–40	37–41	42–36	44–34	46–32	41–37	42–35	43–35	40–38	52–26	

Legend: Blue = home team win; Yellow = draw; Red = away team win.

== Top ten riders (league averages) ==
	Rider	Nat	Team	C.M.A.
1	Ivan Mauger	(New Zealand)	Belle Vue	11.42
2	Ole Olsen	(Denmark)	Wolverhampton	11.36
3	Eric Boocock	(England)	Halifax	10.53
4	Anders Michanek	(Sweden)	Reading	10.51
5	Bernt Persson	(Sweden)	Cradley Heath	10.50
6	Terry Betts	(England)	King's Lynn	10.46
7	Barry Briggs	(New Zealand)	Swindon	10.38
8	Ronnie Moore	(New Zealand)	Wimbledon	10.31
9	Ray Wilson	(England)	Leicester	10.16
10	Martin Ashby	(England)	Swindon	10.07

== British League Knockout Cup ==
The 1972 Speedway Star British League Knockout Cup was the 34th edition of the Knockout Cup for tier one teams. Belle Vue were the winners.

First round

Date	Team one	Score	Team two
09/05	Ipswich	46–32	Sheffield
08/05	Exeter	48–30	Swindon
06/05	Halifax	42–36	Leicester

Second round

Date	Team one	Score	Team two
03/07	Exeter	50–28	Wimbledon
26/06	Hackney	52–26	Cradley Heath
21/06	Poole	52–26	Halifax
16/06	Newport	42–36	Coventry
16/06	Wolverhampton	38–40	Reading
15/06	Oxford	35–42	Kings Lynn
10/06	Cradley Heath	39–39	Hackney
03/06	Belle Vue	41–37	Glasgow

Quarter-finals

Date	Team one	Score	Team two
31/08	Ipswich	38–40	Reading
05/08	Belle Vue	58–20	Newport
05/08	Kings Lynn	56–22	Exeter
04/08	Hackney	45–33	Poole

Semi-finals

Date	Team one	Score	Team two
27/09	Kings Lynn	38–40	Belle Vue
22/09	Hackney	40–38	Reading

Final

First leg

20 October 1972

Hackney Hawks Bengt Jansson 12 Barry Thomas 9 Geoff Maloney 7 Dave Kennett 6 Eddie Reeves 4 Laurie Etheridge 2 Hugh Saunders 0	40–37	Belle Vue Aces Alan Wilkinson 11 Ivan Mauger 10 Peter Collins 6 Sören Sjösten 6 Chris Pusey 3 Eric Broadbelt 1 Ken Eyre 0

Hackney Wick Stadium

Second leg

25 October 1972

Belle Vue Aces Sören Sjösten 10 Chris Pusey 9 Ivan Mauger 8 Ken Eyre 7 Peter Collins 5 Alan Wilkinson 4 Eric Broadbelt 2	45–33	Hackney Hawks Bengt Jansson 12 Geoff Maloney 10 Barry Thomas 6 Dave Kennett 3 Hugh Saunders 2 Eddie Reeves 0 Laurie Etheridge 0

Hyde Road Stadium

Belle Vue Aces were declared Knockout Cup Champions, winning on aggregate 82-73.

== Riders' Championship ==
Ole Olsen won the British League Riders' Championship, held at Hyde Road on 21 October.

Pos.	Rider	Heat Scores	Total
1	(Denmark) Ole Olsen	3 3 3 3 3	15
2	(England) Martin Ashby	2 3 3 3 3	14
3	(New Zealand) Ronnie Moore	3 3 2 3 2	13
4	(England) John Louis	1 1 3 3 3	11
5	(Sweden) Anders Michanek	3 2 1 2 1	9
6	(England) Terry Betts	2 2 2 1 2	9
7	(New Zealand) Ivan Mauger	3 3 ef ef 2	8
8	(Australia) Garry Middleton	2 2 2 2 0	8
9	(Sweden) Christer Löfqvist	2 0 1 1 3	7
10	(Sweden) Bernt Persson	ef 2 3 ex 1	6
11	(England) Ray Wilson	0 1 2 2 0	5
12	(Sweden) Bengt Jansson	1 0 1 1 1	4
13	(England) Bob Kilby	1 0 0 0 2	3
14	(England) Eric Boocock	0 1 1 0 1	3
15	(England) Nigel Boocock	1 ef 0 1 0	2
16	(Scotland) Jim McMillan (res)	2	2
17	(England) Arnie Haley	0 1 0 0 0	1

- ef=engine failure, f=fell, ex=excluded

== Final leading averages ==
	Rider	Nat	Team	C.M.A.
1	Ole Olsen	(Denmark)	Wolverhampton	11.39
2	Ivan Mauger	(New Zealand)	Belle Vue	11.36
3	Terry Betts	(England)	King's Lynn	10.51
4	Anders Michanek	(Sweden)	Reading	10.51
5	Barry Briggs	(New Zealand)	Swindon	10.38
6	Eric Boocock	(England)	Halifax	10.36
7	Ronnie Moore	(New Zealand)	Wimbledon	10.34
8	Bernt Persson	(Sweden)	Cradley	10.27
9	Ray Wilson	(England)	Leicester	10.14
10	Martin Ashby	(England)	Swindon	10.08
11	Bob Kilby	(England)	Exeter	9.89
12	John Boulger	(Australia)	Leicester	9.46
13	John Louis	(England)	Ipswich	9.39
14	Bengt Jansson	(Sweden)	Hackney	9.38
15	Garry Middleton	(Australia)	Oxford	9.24
16	Nigel Boocock	(England)	Coventry	9.23
17	Howard Cole (a.k.a. Kid Brodie)	(Wales)	King's Lynn	8.94
18	Sören Sjösten	(Sweden)	Belle Vue	8.92
19	Christer Löfqvist	(Sweden)	Poole	8.90
20	Jim McMillan	(Scotland)	Glasgow	8.86

== Midland Cup ==
Leicester won the Midland Cup. The competition consisted of six teams.

First round

Team one	Team two	Score
Oxford	Swindon	44–34, 34–44
Wolverhampton	Cradley	40–38, 39–39
Swindon	Oxford	39–39, 36–41

Semi final round

Team one	Team two	Score
Swindon	Leicester	42–36, 30–48
Coventry	Wolverhampton	41–37, 37–41
Coventry	Wolverhampton	42–36, 33–45

Final

First leg

20 October 1972

Wolverhampton Ole Olsen 14 Jon Erskine 10 Dave Gifford 8 George Hunter 6 Dave Baugh 2 Tom Leadbitter 1 Jan Simensen r/r	41–37	Leicester John Boulger 11 Malcom Shakespeare 8 Ray Wilson 5 Norman Storer 5 Alan Cowland 4 Dave Jessup 4 Malcolm Brown 0

Monmore Green Stadium

Second leg

24 October 1972

Leicester John Boulger 10 Ray Wilson 9 Malcom Shakespeare 6 Alan Cowland 6 Norman Storer 5 Dave Jessup 5 Malcolm Brown 4	45–33	Wolverhampton Jan Simensen 10 Ole Olsen 9 Jon Erskine 7 Dave Gifford 4 Dave Baugh 2 Tom Leadbitter 1 George Hunter r/r

Leicester Stadium

Leicester won on aggregate 82–74

== Spring Gold Cup ==
		M	W	D	L	Pts
1	Reading	8	7	0	1	14
2	King's Lynn	8	5	0	3	10
3	Hackney	8	4	0	4	8
4	Wimbledon	8	3	0	5	6
5	Ipswich	8	1	0	7	2

Home \ Away	HAC	IPS	KL	REA	WIM
Hackney		42–36	32–46	37–41	49–29
Ipswich	34–44		33–45	36–42	43–35
King's Lynn	45–33	42–36		36–42	46–32
Reading	38–40	53–25	50–28		53–25
Wimbledon	41–36	47–30	44–34	38–40	

Legend: Blue = home team win; Yellow = draw; Red = away team win.

== Riders and final averages ==
Belle Vue

- (New Zealand) Ivan Mauger 11.36
- (Sweden) Sören Sjösten 8.92
- (England) Peter Collins 8.44
- (England) Chris Pusey 8.20
- (England) Eric Broadbelt 6.72
- (England) Alan Wilkinson 6.68
- (England) Ken Eyre 5.56
- (England) Paul Tyrer 5.11

Coventry

- (England) Nigel Boocock 9.23
- (England) Tony Lomas 8.10
- (England) John Harrhy 7.07
- (Sweden) Jan Simensen 6.85
- (England) Rick France 5.61
- (England) Roy Carter 5.33
- (England) Roger Hill 5.19
- (England) Les Owen 4.52
- (England) Pete Bailey 4.14

Cradley Heath

- (Sweden) Bernt Persson 10.27
- (England) Bob Andrews 7.30
- (England) Roy Trigg 6.95
- (England) Pete Jarman 4.90
- (England) John Hart 4.61
- (England) Mick Handley 4.57
- (England) Jimmy Squibb 3.73
- (New Zealand) Ian Ross 2.00
- (England) Dave Perks 0.91

Exeter

- (England) Bob Kilby 9.89
- (Norway) Edgar Stangeland 8.23
- (England) Bob Coles 6.29
- (England) Kevin Holden 6.06
- (England) Peter Ingram 5.85
- (New Zealand) Bruce Cribb 5.75
- (England) Dave Hemus 5.28
- (England) Chris Julian 4.89
- (England) Phil Woodcock 4.00
- (England) Clark Facey 1.18

Glasgow

- (Scotland) Jimmy McMillan 8.86
- (Scotland) Bobby Beaton 8.58
- (Scotland) George Hunter 8.41
- (Australia) Charlie Monk 6.91
- (Norway) Svein Kaasa 4.94
- (New Zealand) Robin Adlington 4.00
- (Scotland) Jimmy Gallacher 3.72
- (New Zealand) Paul O'Neal 3.47
- (Norway) Kjell Gimre 2.09
- (Scotland) Jim Beaton 1.82

Hackney

- (Sweden) Bengt Jansson 9.38
- (England) Barry Thomas 7.79
- (England) Dave Kennett 6.38
- (England) Geoff Maloney 6.32
- (England) Hugh Saunders 6.27
- (England) Laurie Etheridge 6.24
- (England) Eddie Reeves 5.78
- (New Zealand) Roger Wright 4.00
- (England) Allan Emmett 3.20

Halifax

- (England) Eric Boocock 10.36
- (Sweden) Göte Nordin 8.16
- (England) Dave Younghusband 7.39
- (England) Alan Jay 5.87
- (Australia) Greg Kentwell 5.70
- (England) Tommy Roper 5.36
- (Australia) John Titman 4.03
- (England) Mike Hiftle 3.57
- (England) Malcolm MacKay 3.53

Ipswich

- (England) John Louis 9.39
- (Sweden) Olle Nygren 7.78
- (Sweden) Tommy Johansson 7.67
- (Hungary) Sándor Lévai 6.96
- (England) Pete Bailey 5.07
- (England) Alan Sage 4.61
- (Australia) Billy Sanders 4.46
- (England) Tony Davey 4.35

King's Lynn

- (England) Terry Betts 10.51
- (Wales) Howard Cole (Kid Bodie) 8.94
- (England) Malcolm Simmons 8.36
- (Australia) Phil Crump 7.30
- (Australia) Bob Humphreys 6.21
- (England) Ian Turner 5.72
- (England) Barry Crowson 5.47
- (England) Arthur Price 4.75
- (England) Clive Featherby 4.33

Leicester

- (England) Ray Wilson 10.14
- (Australia) John Boulger 9.46
- (England) Dave Jessup 8.68
- (England) Norman Storer 4.98
- (England) Malcolm Shakespeare 4.81
- (England) Geoff Ambrose 4.47
- (England) Malcolm Brown 3.93
- (England) Alan Cowland 3.25

Newport

- (England) Ronnie Genz 7.45
- (England) Tony Clarke 7.15
- (England) Graham Plant 6.41
- (Australia) Neil Street 5.28
- (England) Phil Woodcock 4.49
- (Sweden) Bo Wirebrand 4.36
- (Poland) Ted Laessing 3.75
- (England) Barry Duke 3.49

Oxford

- (Australia) Garry Middleton 9.24
- (Norway) Øyvind S. Berg 7.97
- (England) Colin Gooddy 6.49
- (England) Malcolm Ballard 6.25
- (New Zealand) Rick Timmo 5.14
- (Scotland) Ken McKinlay 4.81
- (England) Norman Strachan 4.37
- (Denmark) Preben Rosenkilde 3.64
- (England) John Davis 3.00

Poole

- (Sweden) Christer Löfqvist 8.90
- (England) Pete Smith 8.00
- (Norway) Odd Fossengen 6.71
- (Australia) John Langfield 6.47
- (Scotland) Brian Collins 5.75
- (New Zealand) Frank Shuter 5.42
- (England) Mike Cake 4.66

Reading

- (Sweden) Anders Michanek 10.51
- (Norway) Dag Lövaas 8.78
- (Australia) Geoff Curtis 7.73
- (Australia) Geoff Mudge 7.07
- (England) Richard May 6.38
- (England) Mick Bell 6.24
- (England) Bernie Leigh 5.02
- (New Zealand) Graeme Smith 3.77

Sheffield

- (Norway) Reidar Eide 8.85
- (England) Arnold Haley 8.81
- (England) Doug Wyer 7.46
- (England) Reg Wilson 7.34
- (Scotland) Bert Harkins 7.15
- (Australia) Bob Valentine 7.15
- (England) Bob Paulson 6.33

Swindon

- (New Zealand) Barry Briggs 10.38
- (England) Martin Ashby 10.08
- (England) Norman Hunter 6.08
- (England) Mike Broadbank 4.88
- (England) Brian Leonard 4.62
- (England) Clive Hitch 4.21
- (England) Mike Keen 3.88
- (England) James Bond 3.56
- (England) David Ashby 2.00

Wimbledon

- (New Zealand) Ronnie Moore 10.34
- (England) Trevor Hedge 8.13
- (Sweden) Tommy Jansson 7.45
- (England) John Dews 5.02
- (New Zealand) Graeme Stapleton 4.45
- (England) Peter Murray 3.96
- (England) Jim Tebby 3.53
- (Australia) Neil Cameron 3.26
- (England) Pete Wigley 1.71

Wolverhampton

- (Denmark) Ole Olsen 11.39
- (Sweden) Jan Simensen 7.76
- (England) Norman Hunter 6.67
- (New Zealand) Dave Gifford 5.88
- (England) Tom Leadbitter 4.59
- (England) Jon Erskine 4.04
- (England) Dave Baugh 3.75
- (England) Colin Meredith 1.65

== See also ==
- List of United Kingdom Speedway League Champions
- Knockout Cup (speedway)
