= 1971 British League season =

British motorcycle speedway season

- League: British League
- No. of competitors: 19
- Champions: Belle Vue Aces
- Knockout Cup: Hackney Hawks
- Individual: Ivan Mauger
- London Cup: Hackney Hawks
- Midland Cup: Coventry Bees
- Metropolitan Cup: Hackney Hawks
- Highest average: Ivan Mauger
- Division/s below: British League (Div 2)

The 1971 British League season was the 37th season of the top tier of speedway in the United Kingdom and the seventh season known as the British League.

== Summary ==
Reading Racers moved up from Division 2 after taking the Newcastle Diamonds division 1 licence. Belle Vue Aces retained their title to become the first team to win the title for the second time. The team included three time world champion Ivan Mauger, Swedish international Sören Sjösten, Tommy Roper, Eric Broadbelt, Chris Pusey and a 17 year old Peter Collins in his debut season.

== Final table ==
| Pos | Team | PL | W | D | L | Pts |
|---|---|---|---|---|---|---|
| 1 | Belle Vue Aces | 36 | 25 | 1 | 10 | 51 |
| 2 | Leicester Lions | 36 | 22 | 3 | 11 | 47 |
| 3 | Coventry Bees | 36 | 23 | 0 | 13 | 46 |
| 4 | Sheffield Tigers | 36 | 21 | 1 | 14 | 43 |
| 5 | Swindon Robins | 36 | 19 | 3 | 14 | 40 |
| 6 | Reading Racers | 36 | 18 | 4 | 14 | 41 |
| 7 | Hackney Hawks | 36 | 17 | 4 | 15 | 38 |
| 8 | Newport Wasps | 36 | 19 | 0 | 17 | 37 |
| 9 | Wembley Lions | 36 | 17 | 3 | 16 | 37 |
| 10 | Wimbledon Dons | 36 | 18 | 1 | 17 | 36 |
| 11 | Poole Pirates | 36 | 17 | 2 | 17 | 35 |
| 12 | Wolverhampton Wolves | 36 | 17 | 1 | 18 | 34 |
| 13 | King's Lynn Stars | 36 | 16 | 2 | 18 | 34 |
| 14 | Halifax Dukes | 36 | 16 | 2 | 18 | 32 |
| 15 | Exeter Falcons | 36 | 16 | 0 | 20 | 31 |
| 16 | Glasgow Tigers | 36 | 15 | 1 | 20 | 25 |
| 17 | Oxford Cheetahs | 36 | 12 | 1 | 23 | 20 |
| 18 | Cradley Heath Heathens | 36 | 8 | 4 | 24 | 20 |
| 19 | West Ham Hammers | 36 | 9 | 1 | 26 | 19 |

M = Matches; W = Wins; D = Draws; L = Losses; Pts = Total Points

== Fixtures and results ==
| Home \ Away | BV | COV | CRA | EX | GLA | HAC | HAL | KL | LEI | NW | OX | PP | RR | SHE | SWI | WEM | WH | WIM | WOL |
|---|---|---|---|---|---|---|---|---|---|---|---|---|---|---|---|---|---|---|---|
| Belle Vue | | 43–35 | 46–32 | 51–27 | 46–32 | 42–36 | 48–30 | 42–36 | 35–37 | 48–30 | 61–17 | 46–32 | 46–32 | 48–30 | 55–23 | 59–19 | 55–23 | 59–19 | 49–29 |
| Coventry | 41–37 | | 52–26 | 62–16 | 48–30 | 47–31 | 43–35 | 47–30 | 43–35 | 55–23 | 52–26 | 41–37 | 52–26 | 49–29 | 49–29 | 45–33 | 51–27 | 47–31 | 36–42 |
| Cradley | 33–45 | 44–34 | | 39–38 | 38–40 | 39–39 | 49–29 | 34–44 | 39–39 | 40–37 | 39–39 | 41–37 | 38–40 | 41–37 | 36–42 | 39–39 | 49–29 | 37–41 | 42–36 |
| Exeter | 40–38 | 38–40 | 55–23 | | 52–25 | 42–36 | 41–37 | 42–36 | 36–41 | 40–38 | 52–26 | 49–29 | 45–33 | 43–35 | 36–42 | 47–31 | 52–26 | 46–32 | 37–39 |
| Glasgow | 32–46 | 49–29 | 47–30 | 40–38 | | 52–26 | 39–39 | 35–43 | 47–1 | 41–37 | 54–24 | 37–41 | 51–27 | 41–37 | 50–28 | 45–33 | 54–24 | 49–29 | 41–37 |
| Hackney | 36–42 | 42–36 | 48–30 | 40–38 | 41–37 | | 46–32 | 39–38 | 38–40 | 46–32 | 41–37 | 52–26 | 43–35 | 46–32 | 33–45 | 38–40 | 56–22 | 41–37 | 36–42 |
| Halifax | 41–37 | 43–35 | 42–36 | 44–34 | 41–37 | 49–29 | | 49–29 | 34–44 | 46–32 | 50–28 | 55–23 | 46–32 | 39–39 | 40–38 | 48–30 | 42–36 | 50–28 | 44–34 |
| King's Lynn | 42–36 | 38–40 | 47–31 | 40–38 | 41–37 | 39–39 | 53–25 | | 36–42 | 34–44 | 42–36 | 39–39 | 41–37 | 41.5–35.5 | 44–34 | 48–30 | 42–36 | 42–36 | 37–39 |
| Leicester | 38–40 | 44–33 | 43–35 | 48–30 | 47–31 | 47–30 | 57–21 | 42–36 | | 49–29 | 47–31 | 38–40 | 37–41 | 38–40 | 47–31 | 39–39 | 48–30 | 41–37 | 45–33 |
| Newport | 40–38 | 40–38 | 43–35 | 59–19 | 40–38 | 37–41 | 48–30 | 51–27 | 46–32 | | 43–35 | 44–34 | 43–35 | 40–38 | 47–31 | 40–38 | 48–30 | 42–36 | 42–36 |
| Oxford | 42–36 | 38–40 | 40–38 | 37–41 | 40–38 | 41–37 | 45–31 | 42–36 | 33–45 | 42–36 | | 44–34 | 37–40 | 48–30 | 36–41 | 38–40 | 45–33 | 39–38 | 53–24 |
| Poole | 52–26 | 50–28 | 52–26 | 43–35 | 56–20 | 38–40 | 43–35 | 42–36 | 41–37 | 48–30 | 49–29 | | 39–39 | 38–40 | 40–38 | 44–34 | 46–32 | 36–42 | 45–33 |
| Reading | 38–39 | 49–29 | 42–36 | 42–36 | 49–29 | 38–38 | 45–33 | 48–30 | 44–34 | 41–37 | 48.5–28.5 | 57–21 | | 52–26 | 39–39 | 40–38 | 46–32 | 51–27 | 41–37 |
| Sheffield | 41–37 | 43–35 | 43–35 | 42–36 | 46–32 | 44–34 | 46–32 | 40–38 | 44–34 | 44–34 | 61–17 | 48–30 | 43–35 | | 47–31 | 44–34 | 56–22 | 45.5–32.5 | 50–28 |
| Swindon | 36–41 | 48–30 | 42–36 | 37–41 | 43–35 | 39–39 | 42–36 | 35–43 | 38–40 | 47–31 | 49–29 | 42–36 | 45–33 | 41–37 | | 43–34 | 47–31 | 50–28 | 42–36 |
| Wembley | 30–48 | 37–41 | 51–27 | 54–24 | 44–34 | 50–28 | 52–26 | 47–31 | 39–39 | 45–33 | 44–34 | 37–41 | 46–32 | 45–33 | 43–35 | | 49–29 | 49–29 | 48–30 |
| West Ham | 34–44 | 36–42 | 46–32 | 40–38 | 40–38 | 32–46 | 42–36 | 41–37 | 37–41 | 38–40 | 52–26 | 40–38 | 39–39 | 38–40 | 37–41 | 32–46 | | 41–37 | 43–35 |
| Wimbledon | 43–35 | 50–28 | 40–38 | 46–32 | 47–31 | 33–44 | 48–30 | 41–37 | 40–38 | 52–26 | 52–26 | 47–31 | 40.5–37.5 | 48–30 | 39–39 | 45–33 | 43–34 | | 42–35 |
| Wolverhampton | 39–39 | 35–42 | 43–35 | 53–25 | 43–35 | 43–35 | 43–34 | 35–43 | 32–46 | 49–29 | 43–35 | 42–36 | 40–34 | 44–34 | 38–40 | 44–32 | 46–32 | 45–33 | |

Legend: Blue = home team win; Yellow = draw; Red = away team win.

== Top Ten Riders (League Averages) ==
| | Rider | Nat | Team | C.M.A. |
|---|---|---|---|---|
| 1 | Ivan Mauger | (New Zealand) | Belle Vue | 11.42 |
| 2 | Ray Wilson | (England) | Leicester | 10.97 |
| 3 | Ole Olsen | (Denmark) | Wolverhampton | 10.96 |
| 4 | Jim Airey | (Australia) | Sheffield | 10.70 |
| 5 | Barry Briggs | (New Zealand) | Swindon | 10.64 |
| 6 | Bengt Jansson | (Sweden) | Hackney | 10.21 |
| 7 | Eric Boocock | (England) | Halifax | 10.14 |
| 8 | Anders Michanek | (Sweden) | Reading | 10.03 |
| 9 | Nigel Boocock | (England) | Coventry | 9.95 |
| 10 | Ronnie Moore | (New Zealand) | Wimbledon | 9.93 |

== British League Knockout Cup ==
The 1971 Speedway Star British League Knockout Cup was the 33rd edition of the Knockout Cup for tier one teams. Hackney were the winners.

First round

| Date | Team one | Score | Team two |
|---|---|---|---|
| 08/05 | Halifax | 49–29 | West Ham |
| 08/05 | Swindon | 43–35 | Wimbledon |
| 06/05 | Oxford | 46–32 | Poole |

Second round

| Date | Team one | Score | Team two |
|---|---|---|---|
| 25/06 | Wolverhampton | 43–35 | Belle Vue |
| 21/06 | Reading | 38–40 | Cradley Heath |
| 17/06 | Oxford | 39–38 | Exeter |
| 12/06 | King's Lynn | 46–32 | Newport |
| 11/06 | Glasgow | 43–34 | Leicester |
| 10/06 | Sheffield | 48–30 | Wembley |
| 05/06 | Halifax | 42–36 | Coventry |
| 05/06 | Swindon | 36–42 | Hackney |

Quarter-finals

| Date | Team one | Score | Team two |
|---|---|---|---|
| 14/08 | Halifax | 43–35 | Sheffield |
| 06/08 | Wolverhampton | 45–32 | Oxford |
| 31/07 | King's Lynn | 39–39 | Hackney |
| 31/07 | Cradley Heath | 40–38 | Glasgow |
| 03/09 | Hackney | 49–29 | King's Lynn |

Semi-finals

| Date | Team one | Score | Team two |
|---|---|---|---|
| 17/09 | Hackney | 50–27 | Halifax |
| 06/09 | Cradley Heath | 50–28 | Wolverhampton |

=== Final ===
First leg

4 October 1971

| Cradley Heath Bernt Persson 11 Bob Andrews 9 Mick Handley 7 Pete Jarman 6 John Hart 5 Roy Trigg 3 Cyril Francis 0 | 41–37 | Hackney Hawks Bengt Jansson 10 Barry Thomas 8 Hugh Saunders 8 Garry Middleton 7 Laurie Etheridge 2 Geoff Maloney 1 Eddie Reeves 1 |

Dudley Wood Stadium

Second leg

8 October 1971

| Hackney Hawks Bengt Jansson 12 Garry Middleton 10 Barry Thomas 9 Dave Kennett 9 Hugh Saunders 6 Eddie Reeves 3 Laurie Etheridge 2 | 51–27 | Cradley Heath Howard Cole (guest) 13 Bob Andrews 5 Roy Trigg 3 John Hart 3 Pete Jarman 2 Mick Handley 1 Ralph Waller 0 |

Hackney Wick Stadium

Hackney Hawks were declared Knockout Cup Champions, winning on aggregate 88-68.

== Riders' Championship ==
Ivan Mauger won the British League Riders' Championship, held at Hyde Road on 16 October.

| Pos. | Rider | Heat Scores | Total |
|---|---|---|---|
| 1 | (New Zealand) Ivan Mauger | 3 3 3 3 2 | 14 |
| 2 | (New Zealand) Barry Briggs | 2 2 3 2 3 | 12 |
| 3 | (Scotland) Jim McMillan | 1 3 2 3 3 | 12 |
| 4 | (England) Bob Kilby | 3 0 2 2 3 | 10 |
| 5 | (England) Nigel Boocock | 3 2 1 3 0 | 9 |
| 6 | (England) Eric Boocock | 2 2 1 1 3 | 9 |
| 7 | (Denmark) Ole Olsen | 3 3 2 f fx | 8 |
| 8 | (Sweden) Christer Löfqvist | 2 1 0 3 2 | 8 |
| 9 | (Australia) Jim Airey | 1 1 3 1 1 | 7 |
| 10 | (England) Ray Wilson | 1 3 1 1 f | 6 |
| 11 | (Norway) Reidar Eide | 0 2 3 0 1 | 6 |
| 12 | (Sweden) Anders Michanek | 2 1 0 0 2 | 5 |
| 13 | (New Zealand) Ronnie Moore | 0 1 2 2 0 | 5 |
| 14 | (Hungary) Sándor Lévai | 0 0 1 2 1 | 4 |
| 15 | (England) Terry Betts | 0 0 0 1 1 | 2 |
| 16 | (Scotland) Bert Harkins (res) | 2 - - - - | 2 |
| 17 | (Sweden) Bengt Jansson | 1 0 0 0 0 | 1 |

- ef=engine failure, f=fell, exc=excluded

== Final leading averages ==
| | Rider | Nat | Team | C.M.A. |
|---|---|---|---|---|
| 1 | Ivan Mauger | (New Zealand) | Belle Vue | 11.33 |
| 2 | Ole Olsen | (Denmark) | Wolverhampton | 10.99 |
| 3 | Ray Wilson | (England) | Leicester | 10.94 |
| 4 | Jim Airey | (Australia) | Sheffield | 10.74 |
| 5 | Barry Briggs | (New Zealand) | Swindon | 10.67 |
| 6 | Bengt Jansson | (Sweden) | Hackney | 10.26 |
| 7 | Eric Boocock | (England) | Halifax | 10.19 |
| 8 | Anders Michanek | (Sweden) | Reading | 10.05 |
| 9 | Nigel Boocock | (England) | Coventry | 9.95 |
| 10 | Ronnie Moore | (New Zealand) | Wimbledon | 9.89 |
| 11 | Martin Ashby | (England) | Swindon | 9.76 |
| 12 | Bernt Persson | (Sweden) | Cradley Heath | 9.68 |
| 13 | Terry Betts | (England) | King's Lynn | 9.62 |
| 14 | Malcolm Simmons | (England) | King's Lynn | 9.22 |
| 15 | Trevor Hedge | (England) | Wimbledon | 9.18 |
| 16 | Jim McMillan | (Scotland) | Glasgow | 9.18 |
| 17 | Sören Sjösten | (Sweden) | Belle Vue | 9.11 |
| 18 | Reidar Eide | (Norway) | Poole | 9.10 |
| 19 | Göte Nordin | (Sweden) | Wembley | 9.04 |
| 20 | John Boulger | (Australia) | Leicester | 8.99 |

== London Cup ==
Hackney won the London Cup for only the second time, after previously winning it back in 1936.

| Pos | Team | P | W | D | L | F | A | Pts |
|---|---|---|---|---|---|---|---|---|
| 1 | Hackney Hawks | 4 | 4 | 0 | 0 | 177 | 135 | 8 |
| 2 | West Ham Hammers | 4 | 1 | 0 | 3 | 156 | 156 | 2 |
| 3 | Wimbledon Dons | 4 | 1 | 0 | 3 | 135 | 177 | 2 |

| Home \ Away | HAC | WH | WIM |
|---|---|---|---|
| Hackney | | 40–38 | 53–25 |
| West Ham | 36–42 | | 45–33 |
| Wimbledon | 36–42 | 41–37 | |

Legend: Blue = home team win; Yellow = draw; Red = away team win.

== Midland Cup ==
Coventry won the Midland Cup for the third consecutive year. The competition consisted of six teams.

First round

| Team one | Team two | Score |
|---|---|---|
| Wolverhampton | Swindon | 41–36, 41–35 |
| Oxford | Cradley | 38–40, 33–45 |

Semi final round

| Team one | Team two | Score |
|---|---|---|
| Leicester | Wolverhampton | 41–37, 42–36 |
| Cradley | Coventry | 33–45, 27–51 |

Final

First leg

9 October 1971

| Coventry Tony Lomas 11 Nigel Boocock 10 Ron Mountford 7 Jan Simensen 7 John Haarhy 5 Roger Hill 4 Les Owen 1 | 45–33 | Leicester Ray Wilson 12 John Boulger 11 Alan Cowland 3 Graham Plant 2 Norman Storer 2 Tom Leadbitter 2 Malcolm Brown 1 |

Brandon Stadium

Second leg

12 October 1971

| Leicester John Boulger 12 Ray Wilson 8 Graham Plant 6 Malcolm Shakespeare 6 Norman Storer 5 Alan Cowland 4 Malcolm Brown 0 | 41–37 | Coventry Tony Lomas 8 Ron Mountford 8 Jan Simensen 8 Nigel Boocock 5 Roger Hill 5 Les Owen 3 John Haarhy 0 |

Leicester Stadium

Coventry won on aggregate 82–74

== Metropolitan Gold Cup ==
| | | M | W | D | L | Pts |
|---|---|---|---|---|---|---|
| 1 | Hackney | 6 | 5 | 0 | 1 | 10 |
| 2 | Reading | 6 | 3 | 0 | 3 | 6 |
| 3 | Wimbledon | 6 | 2 | 1 | 3 | 5 |
| 4 | West Ham | 6 | 1 | 1 | 4 | 3 |

| Home \ Away | HAC | REA | WH | WIM |
|---|---|---|---|---|
| Hackney | | 37–41 | 45–33 | 44–34 |
| Reading | 35–43 | | 40–38 | 45–33 |
| West Ham | 35–43 | 40–38 | | 39–39 |
| Wimbledon | 35–43 | 50–28 | 41–37 | |

Legend: Blue = home team win; Yellow = draw; Red = away team win.

== Riders and final averages ==
Belle Vue

- (New Zealand) Ivan Mauger 11.33
- (Sweden) Sören Sjösten 9.11
- (England) Tommy Roper 7.14
- (England) Eric Broadbelt 7.01
- (England) Dave Hemus 6.97
- (England) Peter Collins 6.36
- (England) Chris Pusey 6.30
- (England) Ken Eyre 5.27
- (England) Alan Wilkinson 4.74
- (England) Mike Hiftle 4.50

Coventry

- (England) Nigel Boocock 9.95
- (England) Tony Lomas 7.81
- (Sweden) Jan Simensen 7.66
- (England) Roger Hill 6.16
- (England) Les Owen 5.91
- (England) Ron Mountford 5.59
- (England) John Harrhy 5.07

Cradley Heath

- (Sweden) Bernt Persson 9.68
- (England) Bob Andrews 7.73
- (England) Roy Trigg 7.25
- (England) Mick Handley 6.00
- (England) Pete Jarman 5.57
- (England) Jimmy Squibb 4.66
- (England) John Hart 4.25
- (England) Barry Duke 3.60
- (Sweden) Bengt Andersson 2.10
- (England) Richard Eslick 1.54

Exeter

- (New Zealand) Bruce Cribb 8.92
- (England) Bob Kilby 8.87
- (England) Peter Ingram 6.42
- (New Zealand) Wayne Briggs 5.94
- (England) Chris Julian 5.28
- (Sweden) Tommy Bergqvist 5.10
- (England) Phil Woodcock 4.42
- (England) Bob Coles 4.10

Glasgow

- (Scotland) Jimmy McMillan 9.18
- (Scotland) George Hunter 8.29
- (Scotland) Bobby Beaton 7.27
- (Australia) Charlie Monk 6.99
- (Scotland) Willie Templeton 4.80
- (Scotland) Doug Templeton 4.69
- (Scotland) Bill McMillan 3.46

Hackney

- (Sweden) Bengt Jansson 10.26
- (Australia) Garry Middleton 8.97
- (England) Barry Thomas 7.28
- (England) Laurie Etheridge 5.44
- (England) Hugh Saunders 4.88
- (England) Eddie Reeves 4.81
- (England) Dave Kennett 4.65
- (England) Geoff Maloney 4.49
- (England) Graham Miles 4.36
- (Denmark) Preben Rosenkilde 4.00

Halifax

- (England) Eric Boocock 10.19
- (England) Dave Younghusband 8.80
- (England) Alan Jay 6.11
- (Australia) Greg Kentwell 6.09
- (New Zealand) Paul O'Neal 5.01
- (England) Malcolm MacKay 4.56
- (England) Mike Hiftle 4.46
- (England) Chris Bailey 4.24
- (England) Terry Lee 3.75

King's Lynn

- (England) Terry Betts 9.62
- (England) Malcolm Simmons 9.22
- (Wales) Howard Cole (Kid Bodie) 8.11
- (England) Clive Featherby 5.49
- (England) Ian Turner 5.15
- (England) Barry Crowson 4.93
- (Australia) Bob Humphreys 4.38
- (Australia) Jim Ryman 3.91
- (England) Arthur Price 3.79

Leicester

- (England) Ray Wilson 10.94
- (Australia) John Boulger 8.99
- (England) Graham Plant 8.78
- (England) Alan Cowland 5.47
- (England) Norman Storer 5.08
- (England) Malcolm Brown 4.88
- (England) Malcolm Shakespeare 4.44
- (England) Tom Leadbitter 3.33

Newport

- (Hungary) Sándor Lévai 8.76
- (Sweden) Tommy Johansson 8.03
- (Norway) Edgar Stangeland 7.87
- (New Zealand) Bill Andrew 7.24
- (Poland) Ted Laessing 4.84
- (Wales) Bob Hughes 4.53
- (Sweden) Bengt Brannefors 4.42
- (England) Ronnie Genz 4.38
- (Australia) Dave O'Connor 2.11

Oxford

- (Norway) Øyvind S. Berg 7.60
- (Scotland) Ken McKinlay 6.98
- (England) Colin Gooddy 6.86
- (England) Ronnie Genz 6.77
- (New Zealand) Rick Timmo 6.70
- (England) Tommy Roper 6.55
- (England) Norman Strachan 4.58
- (England) Col Cottrell 3.89
- (England) John Jackson 2.57

Poole

- (Norway) Reidar Eide 9.10
- (Norway) Odd Fossengen 7.76
- (England) Pete Smith 7.76
- (Sweden) Bo Wirebrand 6.03
- (Australia) John Langfield 6.01
- (England) Mike Cake 4.93
- (England) Derek Cook 3.14

Reading

- (Sweden) Anders Michanek 10.05
- (Norway) Dag Lövaas 7.74
- (Australia) Geoff Mudge 7.23
- (Australia) Geoff Curtis 6.74
- (England) Richard May 6.13
- (England) Mick Bell 5.25
- (England) Bernie Leigh 4.75
- (Germany) Josef Angermüller 3.30

Sheffield

- (Australia) Jim Airey 10.74
- (England) Arnold Haley 7.58
- (Sweden) Bengt Larsson 7.04
- (England) Bob Paulson 6.60
- (Australia) Bob Valentine 6.03
- (England) Doug Wyer 5.92
- (England) Reg Wilson 5.11
- (England) Brian Maxted 4.60

Swindon

- (New Zealand) Barry Briggs 10.67
- (England) Martin Ashby 9.76
- (England) Mike Keen 6.63
- (England) Mike Broadbank 4.98
- (England) Clive Hitch 4.78
- (Scotland) Jimmy Gallacher 3.80
- (England) Pete Munday 3.79
- (England) James Bond 3.43

Wembley

- (Sweden) Göte Nordin 9.04
- (Scotland) Bert Harkins 8.28
- (Norway) Sverre Harrfeldt 7.80
- (England) Dave Jessup 7.43
- (England) Tony Clarke 7.23
- (England) Brian Leonard 5.72
- (Sweden) Christer Sjösten 4.21
- (Zimbabwe) Peter Prinsloo 1.33

West Ham

- (Sweden) Christer Löfqvist 8.73
- (Sweden) Olle Nygren 8.14
- (England) Reg Luckhurst 6.51
- (Denmark) Preben Rosenkilde 4.93
- (England) Barry Duke 4.44
- (England) Mick Handley 3.82
- (England) Alan Bellham 3.66
- (England) Alan Sage 3.13
- (England) Stan Stevens 2.98

Wimbledon

- (New Zealand) Ronnie Moore 9.89
- (England) Trevor Hedge 9.18
- (England) Cyril Maidment 6.25
- (England) John Dews 5.31
- (England) Jim Tebby 5.13
- (England) Peter Murray 4.69
- (England) John Bishop 4.19

Wolverhampton

- (Denmark) Ole Olsen 10.99
- (England) Norman Hunter 7.61
- (New Zealand) Gary Peterson 6.87
- (England) Dave Baugh 6.56
- (England) Jon Erskine 5.06
- (England) Bill Powell .4.97
- (England) Geoff Ambrose 4.80
- (Denmark) Niels Weiss 4.75
- (Sweden) Bengt Brannefors 3.43
- (England) George Devonport 2.67

== See also ==
- List of United Kingdom Speedway League Champions
- Knockout Cup (speedway)
