= 1969 British League Division Two season =

British motorcycle speedway season

- League: British League Division Two
- No. of competitors: 16
- Champions: Belle Vue Colts
- Knockout Cup: Belle Vue Colts
- Individual: Geoff Ambrose
- Highest average: Des Lukehurst
- Division/s above: British League (Div 1)

The 1969 British League Division Two season was the second season of second tier motorcycle speedway in Great Britain.

== Summary ==
The league expanded from 10 to 16 teams in its second season. Weymouth Eagles dropped out after just one season. The seven new entrants included three newly created teams called the Crewe Kings, Doncaster Stallions and the Rochester Bombers. The King's Lynn Starlets who were the reserve side of the Stars also entered, along with Ipswich Witches who returned to league action (their first since 1962), the Long Eaton Rangers (formerly the Archers), and the Eastbourne Eagles (first since 1959). The Rochester Bombers team moved to Romford from 10 May, after the local council refused to give permission for racing and became known as the Romford Bombers. Former Leicester rider Ivor Brown re-opened the speedway at Long Eaton Stadium.

Belle Vue Colts completed the league and cup double, which included retaining their league title. Ken Eyre and Eric Broadbelt were once again instrumental in helping the Colts win again and they were backed up well by Chris Bailey and Bill Moulin.

== Final table ==
Pos	Team	PL	Home					Away					Pts
Pos	Team	PL	W	D	L	F	A	W	D	L	F	A	Pts
1	Belle Vue Colts	30	14	0	1	785	380	9	1	5	609	558	47
2	Reading Racers	30	13	1	1	678	481	6	0	9	543	622	39
3	Rochester/Romford Bombers	30	11	0	4	649	517	8	1	6	573	592	39
4	Crayford Highwaymen	30	15	0	0	730	434	4	0	11	544.5	621.5	38
5	Rayleigh Rockets	30	12	1	2	671	495	4	1	10	540	625	34
6	Canterbury Crusaders	30	13	2	0	695	471	2	0	13	529	634	32
7	Crewe Kings	30	14	0	1	754	377	1	0	14	503	662	30
8	Eastbourne Eagles	30	13	0	2	651.5	505.5	1	2	12	483	680	30
9	Middlesbrough Teessiders	30	10	1	4	661	509	4	0	11	493	674	29
10	Long Eaton Rangers	30	11	0	4	631	533	3	1	11	475.5	651.5	29
11	Ipswich Witches	30	13	0	2	630	534	1	1	13	491	672	27
12	Doncaster Stallions	30	9	0	6	602	568	3	0	12	463	700	24
13	Nelson Admirals	30	10	2	3	604.5	560.5	1	0	14	459	704	24
14	Berwick Bandits	30	10	0	5	630.5	528.5	1	1	13	484.5	676.5	23
15	Plymouth Devils	30	9	0	6	629	534	0	0	15	375	792	18
16	King's Lynn Starlets	30	6	1	8	576	582	2	0	13	449	708	17

== Fixtures and results ==
Home \ Away	BV	BER	CAN	CRA	CK	DON	EAS	IPS	KL	LE	MID	NEL	PLY	RAY	REA	ROC
Belle Vue		53–24	52–26	45–33	57–21	48–30	60–18	57–21	52–25	61–17	58–20	49–29	57–20	45–32	53–24	38–40
Berwick	34–44		50–28	22–54	43–35	45–32	41–36	40–38	53–25	33.5–41.5	42–36	55–22	55–22	37–41	36–41	44–33
Canterbury	41–36	51–27		46–32	45–33	49–29	39–39	39–39	55–22	52–26	46–32	51–27	52–26	44–33	43–35	42–35
Crayford	44–34	42–35	39–38		44–34	53–24	51–26	55–22	54–24	52–26	53–25	41–37	56–21	51–27	50–28	45–33
Crewe	34–44	51–26	48–30	53–24		56–22	57–21	52–26	56–21	32–10	42–36	54–24	61–17	43–35	62–16	53–25
Doncaster	36–41	39–38	45–32	42–36	47–31		43–35	41–36	40–36	38–40	35–42	43–32	51–37	37–41	36–42	29–49
Eastbourne	44–34	52–24	35–40	49.5–28.5	43–34	47–30		40–36	39–37	47–31	45–33	41–37	47–30	41–36	45–33	36–42
Ipswich	42–36	40–38	40–37	41–37	42–36	50–28	39–38		38–39	41–36	36–41	41–37	57–21	41–37	41–36	36–42
King's Lynn	33–45	48–29	41–37	38–40	29–48	34–43	38–38	41–35		43–34	36–42	37–40	46–31	43–34	31–46	38–40
Long Eaton	34–44	43–35	40–38	43–35	47–31	47–30	48–30	45–33	50–26		36–42	48–29	47–29	43–35	28–50	32–46
Middlesbrough	37–41	39–39	55–23	42–36	48–30	52–26	45–33	42–36	45–33	38–40		49–29	54–24	36–42	37–41	42–36
Nelson	24–54	39.5–37.5	24–54	36–42	41–37	45–33	45–33	43–35	50–27	38–38	52–25		43–35	39–39	41–37	44–34
Plymouth	36–42	34–44	40–38	40–38	49–28	37–40	38–40	42–35	35–42	51–27	45–33	55–23		49–29	42–36	36–39
Rayleigh	36–42	55–23	39–38	36–41	47–31	46–31	42–36	52–26	52–25	43–35	42–36	43–35	57–21		42–36	39–39
Reading	39–39	43–35	43–35	47–31	40–36	53–25	49–27	45–33	46–32	41–37	49–29	54–23	51–21	40–38		38–40
Rochester/Romford	44–33	47–30	43–35	41–37	40–38	38–40	45–33	38–40	43–35	41–37	57–21	43–35	58–20	36–41	35–42	

Legend: Blue = home team win; Yellow = draw; Red = away team win.

== British League Division Two Knockout Cup ==
The 1969 British League Division Two Knockout Cup was the second edition of the Knockout Cup for tier two teams. Belle Vue Colts were the winners of the competition.

First round

Date	Team one	Score	Team two
12/06	Ipswich	55-23	Plymouth
11/06	Belle Vue	55-22	King's Lynn
08/06	Eastbourne	37-40	Rayleigh
12/06	Middlesbrough	49-29	Nelson
09/06	Crewe	49-29	Doncaster
14/06	Canterbury	51-26	Crayford
12/06	Long Eaton	48-29	Berwick
12/06	Romford	38-38	Reading
07/07	Reading	44-34	Romford

Quarter-finals

Date	Team one	Score	Team two
16/07	Belle Vue	58-20	Ipswich
19/07	Rayleigh	43-34	Middlesbrough
14/07	Crewe	44-33	Canterbury
17/07	Long Eaton	42-35	Reading

Semi-finals

Date	Team one	Score	Team two
06/08	Belle Vue	55-23	Rayleigh
08/09	Crewe	58-20	Long Eaton

=== Final ===
First leg

22 September 1969

Crewe Kings Geoff Curtis 10 Colin Tucker 9 Barry Meeks 8 Ian Bottomley 8 Paul O'Neil 6 Pete Saunders 1 Dave Parry 0	42 – 36	Belle Vue Colts Ken Moss 10 Chris Bailey 10 Steve Waplington 5 Mike Hiftle 4 Taffy Owen 4 Eric Broadbelt 3 Ken Eyre R/R

Earle Street

Second leg

24 September 1969

Belle Vue Colts Eric Broadbelt 14 Chris Bailey 11 Mike Hiftle 11 Ken Moss 8 Steve Waplington 6 Taffy Owen 5 Ken Eyre R/R	55 – 23	Crewe Kings Geoff Curtis 9 Paul O'Neil 9 Dave Parry 2 Colin Tucker 1 Ian Bottomley 1 Pete Saunders 1 Barry Meeks 0

Hyde Road Stadium

Belle Vue Colts were declared Knockout Cup Champions, winning on aggregate 91–65.

== Riders' Championship ==
Geoff Ambrose won the Rider's Championship, held at Hackney Wick Stadium on 26 September.

Pos.	Rider	Pts	Total
1	(England) Geoff Ambrose	2 3 3 3 3	14
2	(England) Mick Bell	2 3 2 3 3	13
3	(Scotland) Ross Gilbertson	3 3 3 2 2	13
4	(England) Maury Robinson	3 2 3 1 2	11
5	(England) Reg Trott	3 1 2 2 1	9
6	(England) Peter Murray	3 2 1 3 ef	9
7	(England) Martyn Piddock (res)	1 3 1 3	8
8	(England) Phil Woodcock (res)	1 2 1 3 ef	7
9	(New Zealand) Paul O'Neil (res)	0 ef 2 2 2	6
10	(Australia) Geoff Curtis	ex 3 0 0 3	6
11	(England) Colin Sanders	1 1 1 2 0	5
12	(England) Pete Wrathall	f 1 2 1 1	5
13	(England) Dave Schofield	ex 1 1 0 2	4
14	(England) Ted Spittles	2 0 0 1 1	4
15	(England) Ian Turner	1 2 r 0 0	3
16	(England) Terry Lee	2 fex	2
17	(England) Eric Broadbelt	fex	0
18	(England) Dingle Brown	0 0 0 ex 0	0
19	(England) George Devonport	0 f	0

- f=fell, r-retired, ex=excluded, ef=engine failure

== Final leading averages ==
	Rider	Nat	Team	C.M.A.
1	Des Lukehurst	(England)	Romford/Rochester	11.52
2	Graeme Smith	(New Zealand)	Rayleigh	10.74
3	Tony Lomas	(England)	Long Eaton	10.49
4	Peter Murray	(England)	Canterbury	10.35
5	Ross Gilbertson	(Scotland)	Romford/Rochester	10.10
5	Geoff Curtis	(Australia)	Crewe	10.10
7	Geoff Ambrose	(England)	Crayford	10.03

== Riders' final averages ==
Belle Vue Colts

- Ken Eyre 9.84
- Eric Broadbelt 9.74
- Chris Bailey 8.25
- Bill Moulin 8.19
- Mike Hiftle 8.00
- Ken Moss 7.94
- Steve Waplington 7.94
- Taffy Owen 7.08
- Peter Thompson 6.67
- Colin Goad 5.17

Berwick

- Maury Robinson 9.32
- Mark Hall 8.03
- Peter Kelly 7.93
- Bernie Lagrosse/Roy Williams 6.89
- Brian Black 6.12
- Ken Omand 4.73
- Andy Meldrum 4.60
- Ian Paterson 4.19
- Terry Holmes 3.53
- Alex Nichol 3.43
- Grieves Davidson 3.06
- Colin Robertson 2.74
- Bill Maxwell 1.67

Canterbury

- Peter Murray 10.35
- Martyn Piddock 9.80
- Ken Vale 8.71
- Graham Miles 6.89
- John Hibben 6.57
- Barry Thomas 6.03
- Jake Rennison 5.33
- Dave Percy 4.69
- Graham Banks 4.61
- Jim Crowhurst 4.56
- Brian Foote 4.00
- Gerald Reardon 3.70
- Neville Brice 3.69

Crayford

- Geoff Ambrose 10.03
- Archie Wilkinson 8.56
- Tony Childs 8.24
- Chris Harrison 6.51
- Mick Steel 6.44
- Colin Clark 6.17
- Tony Armstrong 5.26
- Judd Drew 4.33

Crewe

- Geoff Curtis 10.10
- Paul O'Neal 8.88
- Barry Meeks 7.56
- Ian Bottomley 7.03
- Dave Parry 6.76
- Peter Seaton 6.46
- Colin Tucker 6.34
- Pete Saunders 5.92
- Glyn Blackburn 4.14

Doncaster

- Terry Shearer 9.68
- Dave Baugh 8.76
- Guy Hawkes 7.00
- Chris Hawkins 6.38
- Derek Timms 5.77
- Alan Bridgett 5.72
- George Devonport 5.22
- Doug Wyer 3.82
- Stuart Ulph 3.73
- Neil Glover 2.18

Eastbourne

- Barry Crowson 9.93
- Reg Trott 8.70
- Alby Golden 7.88
- Hugh Saunders 7.00
- Dave Jessup 6.62
- Derek Cook 5.32
- Laurie Sims 4.99
- Cec Platt 4.60
- John Hedderick 4.15
- Tony Hall 4.00
- Joe Robson 3.76
- Ray Boughtflower 2.67

Ipswich

- John Harrhy 7.87
- Pete Bailey 7.74
- Ted Spittles 7.61
- Ron Bagley 7.34
- Ernie Baker 6.38
- Dennis Wasden 5.30
- Neville Slee 4.81
- Gil Farmer 4.19
- Mike Coomber 4.09
- Bernie Aldridge 3.88

King's Lynn

- George Barclay 9.18
- Ken Vale 7.33
- Ian Turner 7.16
- Peter Seaton 7.00
- Arthur Price 6.57
- Tony Featherstone 5.29
- Peter Maxted 5.07
- John Ingamells 4.05
- Russ Osborne 3.76
- John Knock 2.40
- Chris Blythe 1.75
- Nigel Spindler 1.33

Long Eaton

- Tony Lomas 10.49
- Geoff Penniket 8.26
- Peter Wrathall 7.78
- Malcolm Shakespeare 6.88
- Glyn Chandler 6.36
- Roy Carter 5.57
- Pat Adaway 4.98
- Peter Gay 4.82
- Gil Farmer 4.52
- Bernie Hornby 2.13

Middlesbrough

- Terry Lee 9.28
- Tom Leadbitter 8.97
- Roger Mills 7.19
- Pete Reading 6.02
- Dave Durham 5.43
- Bruce Forrester 5.13
- Tim Swales 4.75
- Paul O'Neal 4.57

Nelson

- Murray Burt 8.00
- Dave Schofield 8.00
- Alan Knapkin 7.25
- Stuart Riley 5.71
- Sid Sheldrick 5.16
- Dai Evans 4.64
- Peter Thompson 4.29
- Paul Sharples 3.26
- Jack Lee 2.76
- Dave Beacon 1.83

Plymouth

- Colin Sanders 7.17
- Bob Coles 6.37
- Dave Whittaker 6.18
- Chris Roynon 6.11
- Keith Marks 5.24
- John Hammond 4.33
- Ian Gills 4.21
- Clark Facey 2.42

Rayleigh

- Graeme Smith 10.74
- Laurie Etheridge 8.53
- Mike Gardner 7.81
- Geoff Maloney 7.43
- Roger Wright 7.28
- Dingle Brown 7.17
- Terry Stone 6.18
- Dennis Mannion 5.50
- Barry Lee 4.39
- Ian Champion 4.25
- Bob Newman 3.90

Reading

- Mick Bell 9.04
- Richard May 7.96
- Mike Vernam 7.79
- Alan Jackson 7.47
- Ian Champion 6.64
- Phil Pratt 6.33
- Dene Davies 6.18
- Bob Tabet 5.46
- Bernie Leigh 5.05

Rochester/Romford

- Des Lukehurst 11.52
- Ross Gilbertson 10.10
- Phil Woodcock 9.17
- Brian Davies 7.28
- Tony George 5.93
- Brian Foote 5.48
- Frank Wendon 4.99
- Ian Gills 4.64
- Charlie Benham 3.40
- Chris Yeatman 3.20

== See also ==
- List of United Kingdom Speedway League Champions
- Knockout Cup (speedway)
