= 1968 British League Division Two season =

British motorcycle speedway season

- League: British League Division Two
- No. of competitors: 10
- Champions: Belle Vue Colts
- Knockout Cup: Canterbury Crusaders
- Individual: Graham Plant
- Highest average: Mick Handley
- Division/s above: British League (Div 1)

The 1968 British League Division Two season was the inaugural season of a second tier of motorcycle speedway in Great Britain.

== Summary ==
The formation of a new division 2 was a success and attracted five new clubs to league speedway, the Nelson Admirals from Nelson in Lancashire, the Crayford Highwaymen from east London, the Canterbury Crusaders from Kent, the Berwick Bandits from Scotland and the Reading Racers. Additionally three other clubs, Middlesbrough, Plymouth and Rayleigh returned to league action having previously competed in the old defunct Provincial League and Weymouth returned after a 13-year absence.

Belle Vue Aces, members of the first division, fielded a reserve side known as Belle Vue Colts and won the first league title. Colt's riders Taffy Owen, Ken Eyre, Eric Broadbelt and John Woodcock all scored heavily and ended with impressive averages. Canterbury in their first season of existence won the division 2 Knockout Cup beating another new team Reading in the final.

== Final table ==
| Pos | Team | PL | Home | | | | | Away | | | | | Pts |
| Pos | Team | PL | W | D | L | F | A | W | D | L | F | A | Pts |
|---|---|---|---|---|---|---|---|---|---|---|---|---|---|
| 1 | Belle Vue Colts | 18 | 9 | 0 | 0 | 464 | 236 | 5 | 0 | 4 | 348 | 346 | 28 |
| 2 | Nelson Admirals | 18 | 9 | 0 | 0 | 426 | 271 | 2 | 0 | 7 | 309 | 391 | 22 |
| 3 | Middlesbrough Teessiders | 18 | 8 | 0 | 1 | 399 | 299 | 2 | 1 | 6 | 312 | 388 | 21 |
| 4 | Plymouth Devils | 18 | 9 | 0 | 0 | 421 | 280 | 1 | 0 | 8 | 283 | 413 | 20 |
| 5 | Rayleigh Rockets | 18 | 8 | 0 | 1 | 399 | 294 | 1 | 1 | 7 | 301 | 397 | 19 |
| 6 | Crayford Highwaymen | 18 | 8 | 0 | 1 | 435 | 260 | 0 | 1 | 8 | 278 | 420 | 17 |
| 7 | Canterbury Crusaders | 18 | 7 | 1 | 1 | 377 | 322 | 1 | 0 | 8 | 268 | 432 | 17 |
| 8 | Reading Racers | 18 | 6 | 1 | 2 | 388 | 313 | 0 | 1 | 8 | 287 | 412 | 14 |
| 9 | Weymouth Eagles | 18 | 5 | 2 | 2 | 379 | 319 | 0 | 0 | 9 | 275 | 421 | 12 |
| 10 | Berwick Bandits | 18 | 5 | 0 | 4 | 367 | 328 | 0 | 0 | 9 | 261 | 435 | 10 |

== Fixtures and results ==
| Home \ Away | BV | BER | CAN | CRA | MID | NEL | PLY | RAY | REA | WEY |
|---|---|---|---|---|---|---|---|---|---|---|
| Belle Vue | | 54–24 | 55–23 | 57–21 | 46–31 | 42–36 | 48–30 | 46–31 | 53–25 | 63–15 |
| Berwick | 28–49 | | 52–26 | 44–33 | 38–40 | 37–41 | 37–41 | 47–31 | 41–34 | 43–33 |
| Canterbury | 38–39 | 40–37 | | 40–37 | 42–36 | 46–32 | 43–35 | 39–39 | 45–33 | 44–34 |
| Crayford | 43–33 | 57–21 | 57–21 | | 37–41 | 50–27 | 51–27 | 49–28 | 50–28 | 41–34 |
| Middlesbrough | 40–37 | 43–34 | 51–27 | 48–30 | | 35–42 | 47–31 | 40–37 | 45–33 | 50–28 |
| Nelson | 46–32 | 54–23 | 40–37 | 46–32 | 43–35 | | 55–21 | 46–31 | 53–25 | 43–35 |
| Plymouth | 43–35 | 43–35 | 47–31 | 54–24 | 53–25 | 50–28 | | 48–30 | 42–36 | 41–36 |
| Rayleigh | 37–40 | 51–26 | 45–33 | 46–30 | 41–36 | 48–30 | 40–34 | | 44–34 | 47–31 |
| Reading | 37–40 | 45–33 | 37–41 | 46–32 | 39–39 | 41–37 | 50–28 | 44–34 | | 49–29 |
| Weymouth | 34–43 | 48–28 | 48–29 | 39–39 | 49–29 | 42–36 | 42–36 | 38–40 | 39–39 | |

Legend: Blue = home team win; Yellow = draw; Red = away team win.

== Top five riders (league averages) ==
| | Rider | Nat | Team | C.M.A. |
|---|---|---|---|---|
| 1= | Mick Handley | (England) | Crayford | 10.22 |
| 1= | Mike Cake | (England) | Plymouth | 10.22 |
| 3 | Chris Bass | (Australia) | Plymouth | 9.91 |
| 4 | Dave Schofield | (England) | Nelson | 9.82 |
| 5 | Taffy Owen | (Wales) | Belle Vue | 9.59 |

== British League Division Two Knockout Cup ==
The 1968 British League Division Two Knockout Cup was the first edition of the Knockout Cup for tier two teams and coincided with the newly formed league.

Previously the tier two and tier three teams had competed in the National Trophy until 1964, and although they held their own finals during some years it only served as qualification for the main competition. Canterbury Crusaders were the winners of the competition.

First round

| Date | Team one | Score | Team two |
|---|---|---|---|
| 26/08 | Reading | 52-44 | Rayleigh |

Quarter-finals

| Date | Team one | Score | Team two |
|---|---|---|---|
| 10/08 | Canterbury | 56-37 | Crayford |
| 22/08 | Middlesbrough | 53-41 | Nelson |
| 26/08 | Reading | 52-44 | Plymouth |
| 24/08 | Berwick | 45-51 | Belle Vue |

Semi-finals

| Date | Team one | Score | Team two |
|---|---|---|---|
| 30/09 | Reading | 56-40 | Belle Vue |
| 07/09 | Canterbury | 64-31 | Middlesbrough |

=== Final ===
First leg

12 October 1968

| Canterbury Crusaders Peter Murray 14 Barry Crowson 14 Martyn Piddock 13 John Hibben 10 Graham Miles 7 Ken Vale 2 Pat Flanagan 0 | 60 – 36 | Reading Racers Vic White 11 John Poyser 8 Ian Champion 6 Stuart Wallace 4 Phil Pratt 3 Ted Spittles 2 Dene Davies 2 |

Kingsmead Stadium

Second leg

14 October 1968

| Reading Racers John Poyser 17 Vic White 11 Ted Spittles 9 Stuart Wallace 3 Dene Davies 2 Phil Pratt 1 Ian Champion 1 | 44 – 52 | Canterbury Crusaders Peter Murray 14 Barry Crowson 12 John Hibben 8 Graham Miles 6 Ken Vale 6 Martyn Piddock 5 Dave Grimley (guest) 1 |

Reading Stadium

Canterbury were declared Knockout Cup Champions, winning on aggregate 112–80.

== Riders' Championship ==
Graham Plant aged just 19, won the Rider's Championship. The final was held at Hackney Wick Stadium on 27 September. Several riders were involved in a crash, which resulted in Chris Bailey (broken wrist) and Barry Crowson (suspected fractured thigh bone) going to hospital. However, Crowson after receiving an all-clear rode for his parent club West Ham Hammers the following evening.

| Pos. | Rider | Pts | Total |
|---|---|---|---|
| 1 | (England) Graham Plant | 3 3 2 2 3 | 13 |
| 2 | (England) Ken Eyre | 2 3 3 3 1 | 12 |
| 3 | (New Zealand) Graeme Smith | 1 2 3 2 3 | 11 |
| 4 | (England) Mick Handley | ex 3 2 3 3 | 11 |
| 5 | (New Zealand) Murray Burt | 3 f 3 2 3 | 11 |
| 6 | (New Zealand) Allan Brown | ex 2 3 3 2 | 10 |
| 7 | (England) Mike Cake | 3 1 1 3 2 | 10 |
| 8 | (England) Tony Lomas | 2 2 0 1 2 | 7 |
| 9 | (England) John Poyser | 2 r 1 2 1 | 6 |
| 10 | (Australia) John Woodcock | f 2 2 ef 1 | 5 |
| 11 | (England) Dave Schofield | 1 1 1 1 1 | 5 |
| 12 | (England) Martyn Piddock | 0 0 2 1 2 | 5 |
| 13 | (England) Barry Crowson | 2 3 f | 5 |
| 14 | (England) Chris Bailey | 3 f f | 3 |
| 15 | (England) Barry Duke (res) | 1 1 ef | 2 |
| 16 | (New Zealand) Roy Williams | 1 1 0 0 0 | 2 |
| 17 | (Wales) Taffy Owen | 0 1 0 0 0 | 1 |
| 18 | (England) Mike Vernam (res) | 0 0 0 | 0 |

- f=fell, r-retired, ex=excluded, ef=engine failure

== Leading final averages ==
| | Rider | Nat | Team | C.M.A. |
|---|---|---|---|---|
| 1 | Mick Handley | (England) | Crayford Highwaymen | 10.48 |
| 2 | Mike Cake | (England) | Plymouth | 10.22 |
| 3 | Chris Bass | (Australia) | Plymouth | 10.15 |
| 4 | Peter Murray | (England) | Canterbury | 10.05 |
| 5 | Allan Brown | (New Zealand) | Middlesbrough | 9.63 |

== Riders & final averages ==
Belle Vue Colts

- Taffy Owen 9.35
- Ken Eyre 8.94
- Eric Broadbelt 8.15
- John Woodcock 8.15
- Chris Bailey 7.74
- Ken Moss 6.33
- Peter Thompson 5.93
- Brian Bentley 5.49

Berwick

- Bill McMillan 9.12
- Roy Williams 7.85
- Brian Whaley 7.69
- Brian Black 6.81
- Mark Hall 6.59
- Lex Milloy 5.89
- Grieves Davidson 4.53
- Alex Nichol 3.51
- Tom Blackwood 3.37
- Colin Robertson 2.71

Canterbury

- Peter Murray 10.05
- Barry Crowson 8.44
- Ken Vale 8.00
- Martyn Piddock 7.96
- John Hibben 6.85
- Tyburn Gallows 4.91
- Pat Flanagan 4.61
- Chris Raines 4.57
- Frank Wendon 4.30
- Barry Lee 3.15

Crayford

- Mick Handley 10.48
- Tony Childs 7.68
- Derek Timms 6.54
- Colin Clark 6.05
- Dai Evans 5.88
- Geoff Ambrose 5.87
- Stuart Riley 5.12
- Tony Armstrong 4.31

Middlesbrough

- Allan Brown 9.63
- Graham Plant 8.54
- Graham Edmonds 8.31
- Tom Leadbitter 6.82
- Terry Lee 6.78
- Paul O'Neal 6.07
- Pete Reading 4.75
- Alan Palmer 3.25
- John Spilsbury 2.09

Nelson

- Dave Schofield 9.54
- Alan Paynter 9.10
- Murray Burt 8.76
- Gary Peterson 8.14
- Terry Shearer 6.76
- Dave Beacon 5.79
- Jack Winstanley 5.51
- Paul Sharples 4.15

Plymouth

- Mike Cake 10.22
- Chris Bass 10.15
- Phil Woodcock 6.67
- Tony George 6.13
- Dave Whittaker 6.08
- Keith Marks 5.69
- Frank Payne 5.07
- Chris Roynon 4.75
- Ian Gills 3.23

Rayleigh

- Graeme Smith 7.55
- Mike Gardner 7.49
- Dennis Mannion 7.44
- Dingle Brown 6.48
- Laurie Etheridge 6.20
- Geoff Maloney 6.06
- Terry Stone 6.03
- Colin Tucker 3.09

Reading

- John Poyser 9.29
- Ian Champion 6.91
- Joe Weichlbauer 6.88
- Ted Spittles 6.68
- Stuart Wallace 6.20
- Dene Davies 5.39
- Ian Bottomley 4.91
- Phil Pratt 4.59

Weymouth

- Tony Lomas 9.39
- Mike Vernam 7.94
- Barry Duke 7.71
- Chris Yeatman 6.14
- Mick Steel 5.08
- Roy Carter 4.58
- Adrian Degan 3.05
- Phil Arnold 2.72

== See also ==
- List of United Kingdom Speedway League Champions
- Knockout Cup (speedway)
