= West Ham Bombers =

West Ham Bombers may refer to:

- Romford Bombers
- West Ham Hammers
