= Brooklands Stadium =

Former multi-purpose stadium

- Location: Brooklands Road, Romford, East London England
- Coordinates: 51°34′57″N 0°10′18″E
- Opened: 1921
- Closed: 1977

Brooklands Stadium was a multi-purpose stadium, now demolished, used for football and for motorcycle speedway in Romford, Essex. The stadium was located on Brooklands Road

== Origins ==
In 1921, farmland was converted into a cricket ground by the Romford Cricket Club. The site was originally known as the Romford or Brooklyn Sports Ground and used by both the Romford Cricket and Tennis clubs, in addition to holding athletics events. It was purchased by the Romford Sports Ground Ltd in September 1926 for £3,000 and leased to the Cricket and Tennis clubs.

== Football ==
In 1929, the Romford F.C. club was re-established and they took over the use of the Brooklands Stadium, joining the London League. By 1975, the club had developed Brooklands considerably in anticipation of eventually being elected to the Football League and had large debts to show for it, and had to sell Brooklands in 1975 but remained there until 1977.

== Speedway ==
When the Rochester Bombers were refused permission to continue racing at Rochester Stadium in 1969, they were moved to Brooklands by the speedway promotion of Wally Mawdsley and Pete Lansdale. They changed their name to Romford Bombers and held their first meeting on 29 May 1969 in front of 3,000 spectators. The team spent two more seasons in the British League Division Two, finishing in eighth and twelfth places respectively.

The promotion was quite successful but one vociferous local resident obtained a court order closing the track to speedway due to noise pollution.

== Closure ==
It was demolished to make way for housing in 1977. The gabled stand was removed and taken to Kingsmead Stadium.
