= Doncaster Stallions =

Former British speedway team

Club information
- Track address: Doncaster Greyhound Track
- Country: England
- Founded: 1969
- Closed: 1970

Club facts
- Track size: 320 metres (350 yd)

The Doncaster Stallions also known as the Doncaster Dragons were a motorcycle speedway team who operated from Doncaster Greyhound Track, York Road, Doncaster, for two seasons in 1969 to 1970.

== History ==
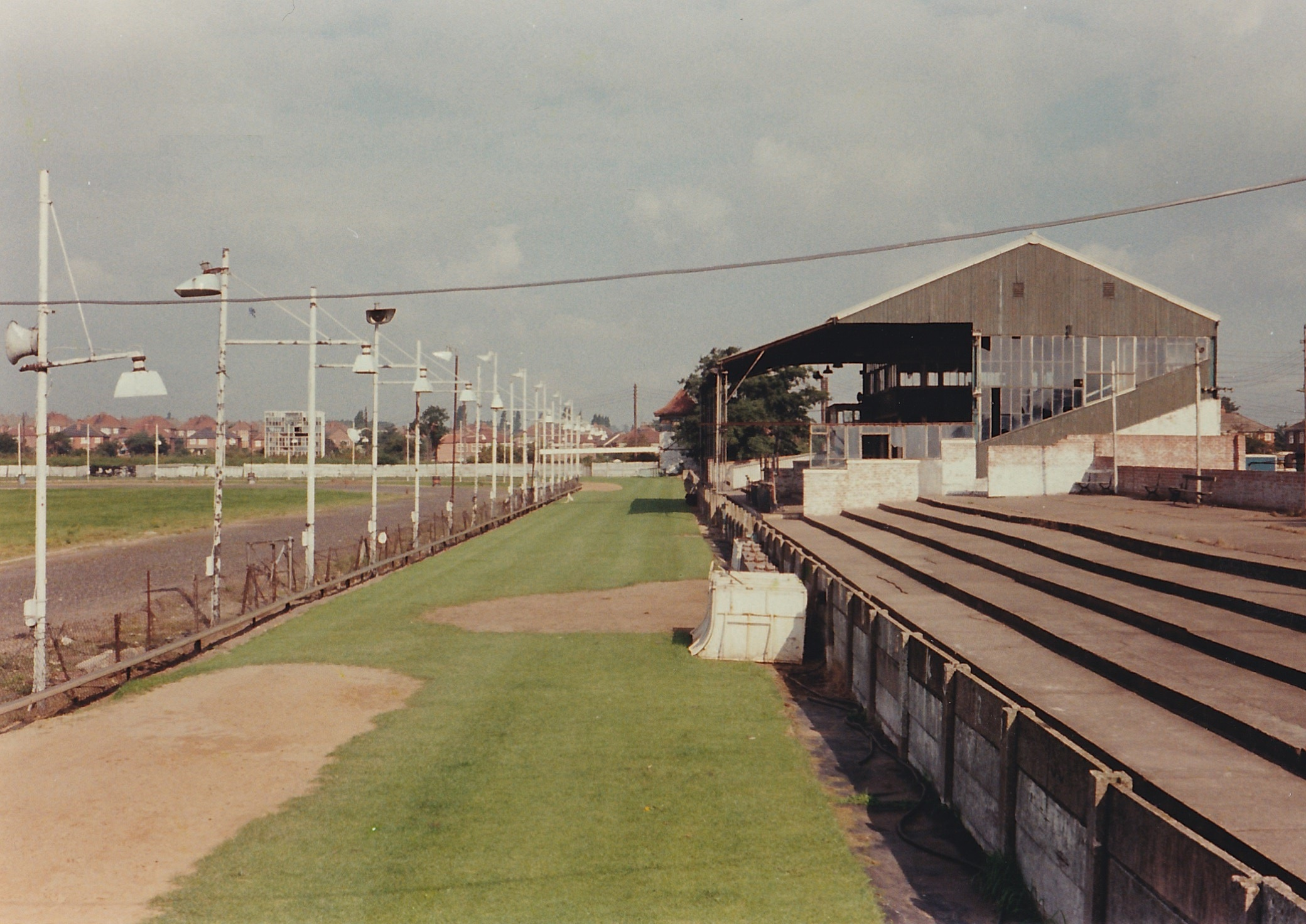
The speedway track on the left side of the grassed greyhound track

The speedway team joined the league system in 1969 and spent both seasons in British League Division Two. During the 1969 British League Division Two season the first home fixture was held on Sunday 27 April; the team eventually finished 12th in the league table.

For their second season they were known as Doncaster Dragons and Gordon McGregor was the rider coach. The Dragons finished 15th from 17 teams in the 1970 British League Division Two season.

In January 1971, the promotion made a successful application to transfer the speedway licence to the Birchfield Ladbroke Stadium. All of the riders were also transferred to the Birmingham Brummies team.

== Season summary ==
Year and league	Position	Notes
1969 British League Division Two season	12th	
1970 British League Division Two season	15th	

== See also ==
- Category:Doncaster Stallions riders
