= Des Lukehurst =

British speedway rider

- Born: 6 May 1937 (age 89); Romney Marsh, Kent, England
- Nationality: British (English)

Career history
- 1963: New Cross Rangers
- 1963: Long Eaton Archers
- 1964–1965, 1969, 1970: Exeter Falcons
- 1966–1967: Oxford Cheetahs
- 1968–1969: Hackney Hawks
- 1969: Wolverhampton Wolves
- 1969–1970: Romford Bombers
- 1970: Wembley Lions

Desmond Herbert Lukehurst (born 6 May 1937) known as Des Lukehurst is an English former motorcycle speedway rider.

== Career ==
Lukehurst rode in the top two tiers of British Speedway from 1965 to 1970, riding for various clubs.

In 1969, Luckhurst topped the league averages during the 1969 British League Division Two season after joining Romford Bombers. The following season in 1970, he rode for the Romford Bombers in addition to the Wembley Lions.
