= Dene Davies =

Australian speedway rider

- Born: 23 January 1947 (age 79); Hindmarsh, South Australia
- Nationality: Australia

Current club information
- Career status: Retired

Career history
- 1968: Leicester Lions
- 1968-1970: Reading Racers
- 1971: Teesside Teessiders
- 1971: Romford Bombers

Dene Davies (born 23 January 1947 in Hindmarsh, South Australia) is a retired Australian motorcycle speedway rider.

== Career ==
Davies competed in sidecar racing with his brother in Australia, and then in scrambling, in which became a close friend of John Boulger, who later encouraged him to travel to England to try to establish himself as a speedway rider.

Davies had first taken up speedway in 1966, and had several races at Adelaide's Rowley Park Speedway in 1966 and 1967. Davies travelled to Britain where he signed for the newly formed Leicester Lions in 1968, initially riding in the junior team. After one appearance in the British League for Leicester, he was loaned out to Reading Racers, also in their inaugural season, getting injured in his first match for the team, but averaging over five points from eighteen matches, also making one further appearance for Leicester in the Midland Cup Final. He stayed with Reading in 1969 and 1970, before moving to Teesside Teessiders in 1971, also riding for Romford Bombers that year, his last in British speedway.
