= Nelson Admirals =

Defunct British speedway team

Club information
- Track address: Seedhill Stadium; Carr Road; Nelson; Lancashire
- Country: England
- Founded: 1967
- Closed: 1970

Club facts
- Colours: Blue & White
- Track size: 360 yards (330 m)
- Track record time: 63.0 seconds
- Track record date: 13/07/1969
- Track record holder: Alan Paynter

The Nelson Admirals were a motorcycle speedway team who operated from Seedhill Stadium in Nelson, Lancashire, England, from 1967 to 1970.

== History ==
During March 1967, promoter Mike Parker applied for a speedway licence for Seedhill Stadium and the stadium duly hosted racing starting on 29 July 1967.

The following season, Nelson were founder members of British League Division Two in 1968 and finished runners-up in its inaugural season. The following season the team finished 13th.

In June 1970, halfway through the season, promoters Les Whaley, Mike Parker and Bill Bridgett moved the British League Division Two side across the Pennines to Bradford. Parker moved the team following difficulties in finding available race days for speedway and stock car racing.

== Season summary ==
Year and league	Position	Notes
1968 British League Division Two season	2nd	
1969 British League Division Two season	13th	
1970 British League Division Two season	N/A	operation moved to Bradford
