= Taffy Owen =

British speedway rider (1935–2021)

- Born: 22 November 1935; Anglesey, Wales
- Died: 26 August 2021 (aged 85); Manchester, England
- Nationality: British (Welsh)

Career history
- 1965, 1971, 1974, 1976: Sheffield Tigers
- 1965–1969: Belle Vue Aces
- 1968–1969: Belle Vue Colts
- 1970: Rochdale Hornets
- 1970–1976: Workington Comets
- 1972: Oxford Rebels
- 1977: Newcastle Diamonds

Team honours
- 1968, 1969: British League Division Two Champion
- 1969: British League Division Two KO Cup Winner

Owen Ellis Owen (22 November 1935 – 26 August 2021), known as Taffy Owen, was an international speedway rider from Wales.

== Speedway career ==
Owen rode in the top tier of British Speedway from 1965 to 1977, riding for various clubs. He made his debut for Belle Vue Aces in 1965.

In 1968, Owen finished fifth in the league averages during the 1968 British League Division Two season, riding for Belle Vue Colts. He continued to score heavily throughout his career hitting a 8+ average for Workington Comets from 1974 to 1976.

Owen's last season in British speedway was with Newcastle Diamonds in the 1977 National League season.
