= Mike Cake =

British speedway rider

- Born: 4 April 1946 (age 80); Parkstone, Poole, England
- Nationality: British (English)

Career history
- 1967–1969: Exeter Falcons
- 1968: Plymouth Devils
- 1970–1972, 1974: Poole Pirates
- 1974–1975: Peterborough Panthers

Individual honours
- 1968: Leading average

Michael Anthony Cake (born 4 April 1946) is a former motorcycle speedway rider from England.

== Speedway career ==
Cake rode in the top two tiers of British Speedway from 1967 to 1975, riding for various clubs.

In 1967, Cake started riding for Exeter Falcons, after being called into the team following an injury crisis. In 1968, he returned the leading greensheet average (jointly with Mick Handley) and second highest actual average during the 1968 British League Division Two season, when riding for the Plymouth Devils. Cake joined Poole Pirates in 1970 and spent four seasons with the club.
