= Romford Bombers =

British motorcycle speedway team

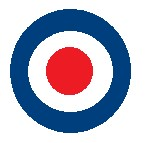

Club information
- Track address: Brooklands Stadium; Brooklands Road; Mawneys; Romford; Essex
- Country: England
- Founded: 1969
- Closed: 1971

Club facts
- Colours: Red, White and Blue
- Track size: 375 yards (343 m)

The Romford Bombers formerly the Rochester Bombers were a speedway team which operated from 1969 until their closure in 1971.

== History ==
In December 1968, rival companies became interested in promoting speedway at the Rochester Stadium, which had only ever held speedway open meetings back in 1932. The Exeter Falcons promotion led by Wally Mawdsley called Enterprises Ltd. and Allied Presentations led by Maurice Littlerchild and Len Silver both entered into negotiations with the stadium owners. In January 1969, the stadium owners agreed to holding speedway and the British Speedway Promoters issued a licence. The team who would be known as the Rochester Bombers, would consist largely of the disbanded Weymouth Eagles team.

Rochester Bombers started their league campaign at the beginning of the 1969 British League Division Two season but the Kent council suddenly ruled against permission to use the facility for speedway, despite the Rochester Town Council being in agreement with the speedway. The club promoters Wally Mawdsley and Pete Lansdale were "left far from satisfied" and started to seek a new venue. The last fixture with the team known as Rochester was on 10 May 1969. A new site was quickly found at the Brooklands Stadium on Brooklands Road, the team changed their name to Romford Bombers and the opening fixture on 29 May, saw 3,000 spectators attend. The team finished the season in a respectable third place.

The team spent two more seasons in the British League Division Two, finishing in eighth and twelfth places respectively.

The promotion was quite successful but one vociferous local resident obtained a court order closing the track due to noise pollution. The promotion transferred to the West Ham Stadium and renamed the team the West Ham Bombers for the 1972 season but were forced to close in May of that year after only seven meetings at the stadium in Custom House. Their place in the league was taken by the non-league team running at Barrow-In-Furness, who later renamed themselves as the Barrow Bombers.

== Season summary ==
Year and league	Position	Notes
1969 British League Division Two season	3rd	started season as the Rochester Bombers
1970 British League Division Two season	8th	
1971 British League Division Two season	12th	
