= Alan Cowland =

- Born: 17 March 1941; St. Austell, Cornwall, England
- Died: January 2005 (aged 64); Wellingborough, Northamptonshire, England
- Nationality: British (English)

Career history
- 1962–1965, 1969: Exeter Falcons
- 1966: Wolverhampton Wolves
- 1967–1968, 1973: Wimbledon Dons
- 1970–1972: Leicester Lions
- 1973, 1974–1975: Hull Vikings
- 1973: Newport Wasps
- 1974: Workington Comets
- 1976: Peterborough Panthers
- 1976: Mildenhall Fen Tigers

Team honours
- 1962: Provincial League KO Cup winner
- 1968: British League KO Cup winner
- 1968: London Cup
- 1972: Midland Cup

Alan Edward Cowland (17 March 1941 – January 2005) was a motorcycle speedway rider, who represented England and Great Britain.

== Biography ==
Born in St. Austell, Cornwall, Cowland got his first taste of speedway at Rye House in 1962, and was part of the Exeter Falcons Provincial League/British League team between 1962 and 1965, and represented Great Britain against an Overseas team and England against Scotland in 1964. After spells with Wolverhampton Wolves and Wimbledon Dons, he signed for Leicester Lions in 1970, spending three seasons with the team, and winning the Midland Pairs Handicap trophy (with Graham Plant) in 1971.

By the end of the 1972 season, Cowland's average had dropped to just over three points and in 1973 he dropped down to the second division with Hull Vikings, representing the 'Young England' team against Australasia that year. In 1974, he moved on to Workington Comets and had a few rides in the first division with Hull, moving to the Vikings on a full-time basis in 1975. After seasons with Mildenhall Fen Tigers and Peterborough Panthers in which his average steadily declined, he retired in 1976.

During his career, Cowland also raced in the Netherlands, Denmark, Germany, Poland, Czechoslovakia, Austria and Rhodesia, and learned to speak German, French, and Czech.

Cowland also worked as a toolmaker/turner, and after speedway ran a car dealership in Wellingborough. He was found hanged in his garage in Wellingborough in January 2005.
