= Graeme Smith (speedway rider) =

New Zealand speedway rider

- Born: 14 November 1947 (age 79); Palmerston North, New Zealand
- Nationality: New Zealander

Career history
- 1968–1969: Rayleigh Rockets
- 1968–1969: Hackney Wick Wolves
- 1970–1971: Canterbury Crusaders
- 1972: Sunderland Stars
- 1972: Reading Racers

Team honours
- 1970: League champion (tier 2)

Graeme john Smith (born 14 November 1947) is a former motorcycle speedway rider from New Zealand. He earned two international caps for the New Zealand national speedway team.

== Biography ==
Smith, born in Palmerston North, New Zealand, began his British leagues career riding for Rayleigh Rockets during the 1968 British League Division Two season season. He made an immediate impact topping the Rockets league averages and being made the club captain. He also made two appearances for Hackney Hawks in division 1.

The following season in 1969, Smith improved further, averaging an impressive 10.74 for the Rockets, which was the second highest in the entire league for the season. He also broke into the Hackney first team for the season. He failed his driving test the same season for reportedly two wheel cornering. In September 1969, he represented a Young Austrlasians team against England.

Canterbury Crusaders promoter Johnnie Hoskins signed Smith for the 1970 British League Division Two season and also brought back Barry Crowson to the club. The signings propelled Canterbury to the league title and Smith once again finished second in the entire league averages and was rewarded by taking the captaincy of the Crusaders. Smith also set the track record around Kingsmead Stadium in July 1970, recording 74 seconds and won the Tweedmouth Trophy.

Smith married on 2 August 1970 but then suffered a leg injury and was later subject to a Speedway Control Board suspension at the start of the 1971 season, due to remarks he made to a track official. Smith had gained significant status at Canterbury but had a troubled season, threatening to retire and struggling to overcome earlier injuries.

Smith left Canterbury in early 1972 to join Sunderland Stars and Reading Racers in their respective divisions, in what turned out to be his last season in British speedway because he returned to New Zealand with his wife and young daughter.
