= Murray Burt =

New Zealand speedway rider

- Born: 15 August 1943; Christchurch, New Zealand
- Died: 24 September 2023 (aged 80); Christchurch, New Zealand
- Nationality: New Zealander

Career history
- 1967: Wimbledon Dons
- 1967-1969: Newcastle Diamonds
- 1968, 1969: Nelson Admirals

Individual honours
- 1965: New Zealand Champion

Murray Burt (15 August 1943 – 24 September 2023) was a New Zealand former motorcycle speedway rider.

== Speedway career ==
Burt began riding at the Templeton track in Christchurch in 1962 on a speedway bike he had purchased from Barry Briggs. His older brother Selwyn, who was also a speedway rider, helped him when he began riding. In 1965, he won the New Zealand Speedway Championship and in 1966 was runner up to Bob Andrews.

In 1967, Burt trialed for the Wimbledon Dons and won a team place. Later in the season, he was loaned out to the Newcastle Diamonds. In 1968 and 1969, he rode for Newcastle in the first division and for the Nelson Admirals in the second division. In August 1969, he broke his leg in a speedway accident and this ended his motorcycle career.

In the 1970s, Burt drove speedway midget cars finishing third in the New Zealand Midget Championship in the 1972-73 and 1973-74 seasons. He also drove saloon cars for one season at the Woodford Glen Speedway in 1975.
