= Ken Eyre (speedway rider) =

British speedway rider (born 1946)

- Born: 17 July 1946 (age 80); Buxton, England
- Nationality: British (English)

Career history
- 1968–1969: Belle Vue Colts
- 1968–1972: Belle Vue Aces
- 1973–1974: Wolverhampton Wolves

Individual honours
- 1968: Second Division Riders runner-up

Team honours
- 1970, 1971, 1972: British League Champion
- 1972: British League KO Cup Winner
- 1968, 1969: British League Division Two Champion
- 1969: British League Division Two KO Cup Winner
- 1973: Midland Cup

Kenneth Eyre (born 17 July 1946) is a former motorcycle speedway rider from England.

== Speedway career ==
Eyre rode in the top tier of British Speedway from 1968 to 1974, riding primarily for Belle Vue Aces. He was an integral part of the Belle Vue team that won three consecutive league titles in 1970, 1971 and 1972.

Eyre joined Wolverhampton Wolves in 1973, and rode for them for two seasons.
