= Roger Hill (speedway rider) =

British motorcycle speedway rider

- Born: 9 March 1944 (age 82); Coventry, England
- Nationality: British (English)

Career history
- 1965–1975: Coventry Bees

Team honours
- 1968: league champion (tier 1)
- 1967: Knockout Cup
- 1966, 1969 1970, 1971: Midland Cup

Roger Alan Hill (born 9 March 1944) is a former international motorcycle speedway rider from England. He earned one international cap for the England national speedway team.

== Biography ==
Hill, born in Coventry, only ever rode for one team and that was his home city team, the Coventry Bees. He began his British leagues career for the Midlands team during the 1965 British League season. His first full season with Coventry was in 1966, and he helped the team win the Midland Cup.

Hill experienced more success the following two seasons, as a member of the Knockout Cup winning team of 1967 and league champion team of 1968. By 1971, he had increased his average and won three successive Midland Cups with the Bees. In 1972, he crashed and suffered facial lacerations, a broken arm and broken pelvis. This led to limited action over the next three seasons.

In 1975, Hill had his 11th and final season with the club because he had previously suffered serious injuries and his form had deserted him, resulting in retirement.
