= Tony Lomas =

British former motorcycle speedway rider (born 1943)

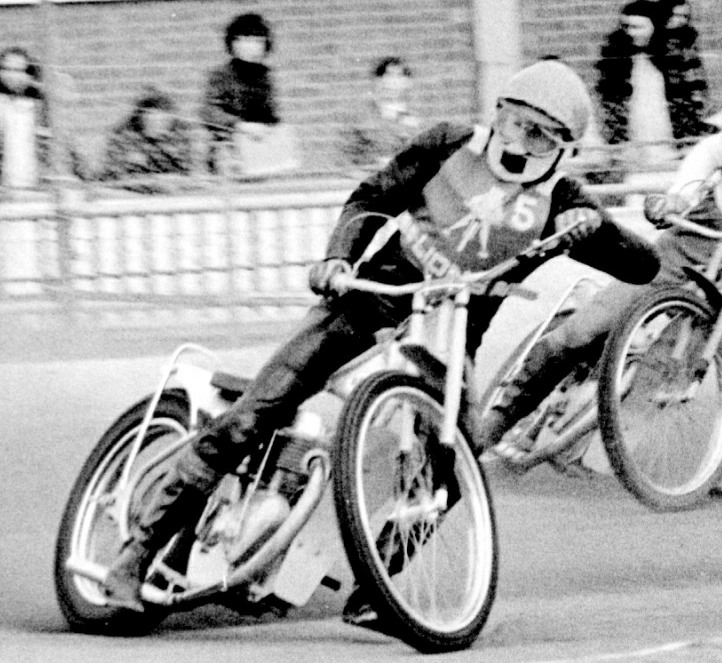
- Lomas in action during 1975
- Born: 10 May 1943 (age 83); Coventry, Warwickshire, England
- Nationality: British (English)

Career history
- 1968: Weymouth Eagles
- 1969: Long Eaton Rangers
- 1968-1972: Coventry Bees
- 1973: Oxford Rebels
- 1973-1974: Exeter Falcons
- 1975-1976: Leicester Lions
- 1978-1979: Stoke Potters

Team honours
- 1974: British League Winner
- 1969, 1970, 1971: Midland Cup Winner

Anthony Carl Lomas (born 10 May 1943) is a former motorcycle speedway rider from England. He earned 12 international caps for the England national speedway team.

== Biography ==
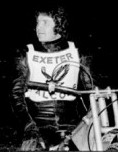
Tony Lomas

Born in Coventry, Lomas took up speedway at a Coventry training school in 1967 and after being signed by Coventry Bees was loaned out to Weymouth Eagles in Division Two of the British League in 1968, also riding for his parent club in one league match that year. He averaged over nine points in his first season, in which he also finished eighth in the Second Division Riders Championship, and in 1969, riding for Long Eaton Rangers, his average rose to almost 10.5 in division two and over 4.7 for Coventry in division one.

From 1969 to 1971, Lomas helped Coventry win three consecutive Midland Cup titles.

By 1971, Lomas had improved further and made his debut for England against Scotland, and for the British Lions against Australia, and was also reserve in the World Final. In 1972, he averaged over eight points per match for Coventry and rode in further test matches for England. In 1973, he left Coventry, riding for Oxford Rebels before moving on to Exeter Falcons and riding in the championship-winning team of 1974. In 1975 he signed for Leicester Lions where he spent two seasons, but with his level of performance dropping, he dropped down to the National League in 1978 with Stoke Potters. He rode for Stoke again in 1979, retiring before the season ended.

== World Final appearances ==
=== Individual World Championship ===
- 1971 - (Sweden) Gothenburg, Ullevi - Reserve - Did not ride
