= Mick Handley =

British speedway rider

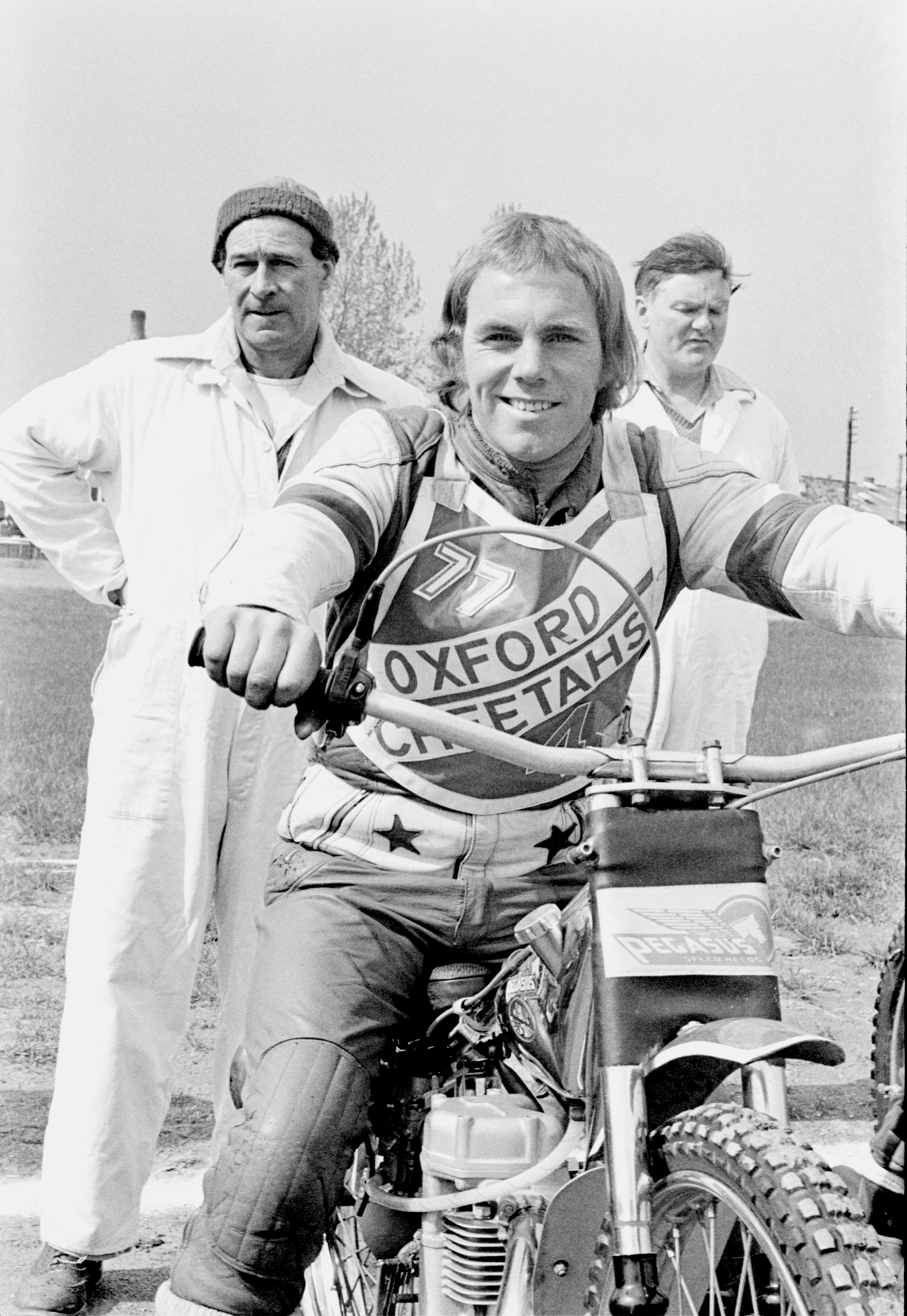
- Born: 29 December 1946 (age 79); Dudley, West Midlands, England
- Nationality: British (English)

Career history
- 1966–1970: Wolverhampton Wolves
- 1968: Crayford Highwaymen
- 1971: West Ham Hammers
- 1971–1972: Cradley Heathens
- 1973, 1975: Chesterton/Stoke
- 1973: Long Eaton Rangers
- 1973–1975: Swindon Robins
- 1976–1982: Oxford Cheetahs
- 1978: Scunthorpe Saints

Michael Handley (born 29 December 1946 Dudley) known as Mick Handley is a former Motorcycle speedway rider from England.

== Speedway career ==
Handley was about 16 when he bought a speedway bike, which he used to push across fields to a cycle speedway track where he started to learn to ride. When he first rode at Cradley in second half rides, he had no transport and he would push the bike the two miles from home to the track, which he did several times before a lift was organised for him. A neighbour would give him lifts to Wolverhampton until he had an ultimatum to decide on which club he would ride for. As Wolves were about to tour in Italy and offered him a place on the team, he signed without hesitation.

Handley rode in the top two tiers of British Speedway from 1966 to 1982, riding for various clubs.

Starting his career at Wolverhampton Wolves, where he spent five seasons, Handley was transferred in controversial circumstances to West Ham Hammers in 1971. In-between in 1968, he topped the league averages during the 1968 British League Division Two season, riding for the Crayford Highwaymen.

When Oxford Speedway was rescued from closure in 1976, Handley was one of the first riders to represent the reformed Oxford Cheetahs under promoters Harry Bastable and Tony Allsopp. He continued to ride for the Cheetahs for seven years despite a serious crash in 1980 when he sustained serious leg injuries.

== After speedway ==
Handley had still remained a builder by trade throughout his career and returned to housebuilding full time after hanging up his leathers. He lives in Dudley with wife, Arlene, and is a father.
