= Graham Plant =

British motorcycle speedway rider

- Born: 15 December 1949 (age 76); Leicester, England
- Nationality: British (English)

Career history
- 1968–1971: Leicester Lions
- 1968: Middlesbrough Teessiders
- 1972–1973: Newport Wasps
- 1974–1977, 1979: Halifax Dukes
- 1980–1981, 1983: Milton Keynes Knights

Individual honours
- 1968: Second Division Riders Champion
- 1969: British Under-21 Champion

Graham W Plant (born 15 December 1949) is a former motorcycle speedway rider from England. He won the Second Division Riders Championship in 1968. He earned five international caps for the England national speedway team and one cap for the Great Britain team.

== Biography ==
Born in Leicester, Plant is the son of former speedway rider Wilf Plant, and began racing in his teens, initially in go-kart and sidecar racing.

After practicing at King's Lynn Stadium, Plant had his first speedway races in second half events at Long Eaton Speedway in 1967. In 1968, he joined second division Middlesbrough Teessiders on loan from Leicester Lions, and impressive performances (he averaged 8.54 over the season) also led to appearances in the first division for the Lions. Aged just 19, he won the British League Division Two Riders Championship, held at Hackney Wick Stadium on 27 September 1968.

In 1969, Plant rode full-time for the Lions, averaging 6.21 over the season, including one full maximum score. Also in 1969, he won the British Under 21 Championship. By 1971, he was one of the Lions' top riders, averaging 8.78 over the season, and he represented England in international competition and finished third in the Rhodesian Open Championship. In 1972 he moved to Newport Wasps, where he stayed for two seasons before moving on to Halifax Dukes, where he stayed until 1979, although he made no appearances in 1978 and only rode in only a handful of matches in 1979, before retiring. This was partly due to his problems associated to a broken leg suffered in 1976.

Plant returned in 1980 with National League team the Milton Keynes Knights where he raced in 1980 and 1981, when his season was cut short after a loss of form and a falling-out with the team management. He returned briefly for the Knights in 1983, before retiring for the final time.
