= Peter Murray (speedway rider) =

British speedway rider

- Born: 18 March 1948 (age 78); Wimbledon, London
- Nationality: British (English)

Career history
- 1967–1972, 1973: Wimbledon Dons
- 1968–1969, 1973–1974: Canterbury Crusaders
- 1973: Reading Racers
- 1973: Swindon Robins

Team honours
- 1968, 1969, 1970: Knockout Cup (tier 1)
- 1968: Knockout Cup (tier 2)
- 1968, 1969, 1970: London Cup

Peter Murray (born 18 March 1948) is a former English motorcycle speedway rider.

== Biography ==
Murray, born in Wimbledon, London, began his British leagues career making an appearance for Wimbledon Dons during the 1967 British League season season. The following season he established himself in both division 1 with Wimbledon and division 2 with Canterbury Crusaders.

Murray had the distinction of winning both the division 1 and 2 Knockout Cups in 1968. Additionally he won the London Cup with Wimbledon that year.

Arguably, Murray's breakthrough year was 1969 because he topped the Canterbury team averages with an impressive 10.35, an average that was the fourth highest in the league. In addition, he won a second Knockout Cup and London Cup with Wimbledon. He left Canterbury the following season, missing out on their league title success, but gained consolation with a third consecutive Knockout Cup and London Cup with Wimbledon.

After a couple more seasons with the London team, Murray returned to Canterbury in 1973, a season which saw him win the Invicta Ludorum Trophy

Murray retired during the 1974 season.
