= 1963 Provincial Speedway League =

British motorcycle speedway season

- League: Provincial League
- No. of competitors: 13
- Champions: Wolverhampton Wolves
- Knockout Cup: Cradley Heathens
- Individual: Ivan Mauger
- Northern League: Sheffield Tigers
- Midland League: Cradley Heathens
- Southern League: Poole Pirates
- Highest average: George Hunter
- Division/s above: 1963 National League

The 1963 Provincial Speedway League was the fourth season of the Provincial League in the United Kingdom. Thirteen speedway teams took part.

== Season summary ==
Thirteen teams competed again as in 1962, despite the loss of four teams. At the start of the year Neath had folded, and their place was taken by the new track at St Austell. After finishing at the bottom of the table the previous year, Bradford and Leicester were no longer running due to financial difficulties and Plymouth had also withdrawn. Long Eaton returned to competitive racing after 12 years under Reg Fearman, and Rayleigh returned under new ownership after a missing the 1962 season. New Cross Rangers would have made it 14 teams after returning but closed down in August, never to re-open.

Speedway returned to Hackney Wick Stadium after an absence of 25 years under the promotion of Mike Parker and Reg Fearman.

Wolverhampton won the league but there was controversy at the end of the year when Wolverhampton refused to move up to the National League, which was dwindling in numbers. This would lead to the Provincial League running outside of the jurisdiction of the Speedway Control Board for the 1964 season.

Cradley Heath won the Knockout Cup and the Midland League Championship, while Poole won the Southern League Championship and Sheffield the Northern League Championship.

== League ==
=== Final table ===
Pos	Team	M	W	D	L	Pts
1	Wolverhampton Wolves	24	15	1	8	31
2	Stoke Potters	24	14	1	9	29
3	Poole Pirates	24	14	0	10	28
4	Sheffield Tigers	24	14	0	10	28
5	St Austell Gulls	24	13	2	9	28
6	Newcastle Diamonds	24	13	1	10	27
7	Exeter Falcons	24	12	1	11	25
8	Edinburgh Monarchs	24	12	1	11	25
9	Cradley Heath Heathens	24	11	1	12	23
10	Hackney Hawks	24	10	1	13	21
11	Middlesbrough Bears	24	9	2	13	20
12	Long Eaton Archers	24	7	2	15	16
13	Rayleigh Rockets	24	5	1	18	11

M = Matches; W = Wins; D = Draws; L = Losses; Pts = Total Points

- New Cross Rangers resigned in mid-season – record expunged.

=== Fixtures and results ===
Home \ Away	CH	ED	EX	HAC	LE	MID	NEW	NC	PP	RAY	SA	SHE	STO	WOL
Cradley Heath		47–31	42–36	46–31	53–24	36–42	53–25	44–34	42–36	47–31	36–36	41–37	52–26	57–21
Edinburgh	48–30		44–34	55–23	59.5–18.5	44–34	43–35	n/a	43–35	46–32	44–34	41–37	54–24	54–24
Exeter	46–32	50–28		49–29	47–30	55–23	51–27	48–30	47–31	45–33	47–31	48–29	45–33	38–40
Hackney	45–33	42–36	40–37		46–32	43–34	42–35	n/a	44–34	39–39	54–24	37–41	34–43	40–38
Long Eaton	43–34	41–37	38–39	47–31		41–36	36–42	n/a	46–32	44–33	38–40	41–37	27.5–50.5	39–39
Middlesbrough	54–24	42–35	39–39	49–29	40–38		40–38	51–27	37–41	47–30	39–39	43–34	43–35	35–38
Newcastle	45–33	39–39	42–36	47–31	38–31	49–29		47–31	50–28	56–22	40–37	+	26–52	42–36
New Cross	n/a	n/a	n/a	n/a	44–32	41–36	44–34		37–41	n/a	38–39	42–35	35–43	35–43
Poole	55–23	48–30	43–34	60–18	54–24	49–29	51–27	51–27		52–26	44–34	43–35	54–24	47–31
Rayleigh	38–40	38–36	42–36	36–41	41–37	46–32	40–38	n/a	36–42		34–44	32–43	38–39	38–40
St Austell	47–31	58–19	41–37	42–36	49–29	44–34	42–36	53–25	45–33	48–30		37–41	49–29	48–30
Sheffield	41–37	45–33	46–32	49–29	50–28	59–19	37–41	49–27	55–23	54–23	44–34		46–32	56–22
Stoke	50–27	44–34	52–26	45–33	39–39	50–28	36–42	48–29	43–35	55–23	50–26	43–35		42–36
Wolverhampton	39–38	42–36	47–31	39–38	42–36	44–33	44–30	43–35	44–34	44–34	40–38	43–35	43–35	

Legend: Blue = home team win; Yellow = draw; Red = away team win.

+Newcastle awarded win

=== Top five riders (league only) ===
	Rider	Nat	Team	C.M.A.
1	George Hunter	(Scotland)	Edinburgh	11.09
2	Ivan Mauger	(New Zealand)	Newcastle	10.42
3	Ivor Brown	(England)	Cradley	10.30
4	Jimmy Squibb	(England)	New Cross/Exeter	10.30
5	Clive Featherby	(England)	Sheffield	10.05

== Provincial League Knockout Cup ==
The 1963 Provincial League Knockout Cup was the fourth edition of the Knockout Cup for the Provincial League teams. Cradley Heathens were the winners.

First round

Date	Team one	Score	Team two
30/04	New Cross	58–37	St Austell
03/06	Rayleigh	35–61	Stoke
18/06	Long Eaton	43–52	Newcastle
20/06	Middlesbrough	58–38	Wolverhampton
20/06	Sheffield	57–39	Exeter
03/07	Poole	50–46	Edinburgh

Second round

Date	Team one	Score	Team two
08/07	Newcastle	65–31	Middlesbrough
10/07	Hackney	54–42	New Cross
10/07	Poole	44–52	Sheffield
05/08	Cradley Heath	55–41	Stoke

Semi-finals

Date	Team one	Score	Team two
12/08	Newcastle	60–36	Hackney
31/08	Cradley Heath	61–35	Sheffield

=== Final ===
First leg

30 September 1963

Newcastle Peter Kelly 13 Mike Watkin 12 Jack Winstanley 6 Ray Day 6 Russ Dent 6 Dennis Jenkins 6 Milton Cazely 1	50–45	Cradley Heath Ivor Brown 14 Harry Bastable 12 John Edwards 9 Derek Timms 5 Alan Totney 4 Ivor Davies 1 John Hart 0

Brough Park Stadium

Second leg

12 October 1963

Cradley Heath Ivor Brown 15 John Hart 15 John Edwards 13 Derek Timms 8 Harry Bastable 6 Alan Totney 6 Joe Westwood 1	64–32	Newcastle Peter Kelly 10 Bob Duckworth 8 Mike Watkin 6 Jack Winstanley 3 Ray Day 3 Maury Robinson 2 Dennis Jenkins 0

Dudley Wood Stadium

== Supplementary leagues ==
Northern League

Team	PL	W	D	L	Pts
Sheffield	6	4	0	2	8
Edinburgh	6	3	1	2	7
Newcastle	6	2	1	3	5
Middlesbrough	6	2	0	4	4

Southern League

Team	PL	W	D	L	Pts
Poole	8	6	0	2	12
Exeter	8	5	0	3	10
New Cross	8	5	0	3	10
Hackney	8	3	0	5	6
Rayleigh	8	1	0	7	2

Home \ Away	ED	MID	NEW	SHE
Edinburgh		52–26	58–20	47–31
Middlesbrough	45–33		51–26	38–39
Newcastle	39–39	46–31		41–36
Sheffield	47–31	46–32	46–31	

Legend: Blue = home team win; Yellow = draw; Red = away team win.

Home \ Away	EX	HAC	NC	PP	RAY
Exeter		56–22	53–25	34–44	54–24
Hackney	36–42		40–38	33–45	44–33
New Cross	45–32	45–33		40–38	40–36
Poole	48–30	53–24	47–31		50–28
Rayleigh	28–50	32–43	35–43	41–37	

Legend: Blue = home team win; Yellow = draw; Red = away team win.

Midland League

Team	PL	W	D	L	Pts
Cradley Heath	6	5	0	1	10
Stoke	6	4	0	2	8
Long Eaton	6	2	0	4	4
Wolverhampton	6	1	0	5	2

Home \ Away	CH	LE	STO	WOL
Cradley Heath		45–33	53–25	41–37
Long Eaton	34–44		32–46	40–37
Stoke	38–40	50–28		40–38
Wolverhampton	50–28	37–40	35–39	

Legend: Blue = home team win; Yellow = draw; Red = away team win.

== Riders' Championship ==
Ivan Mauger won the Riders' Championship. The final was held at Hyde Road on 28 September.

Pos.	Rider	Pts	Total
1	(New Zealand) Ivan Mauger	3,2,3,3	11+3
2	(England) Jack Kitchen	3,2,3,3	11+2
3	(Scotland) Ross Gilbertson	1,3,3,2	9+3+1
4	(Scotland) George Hunter	1,2,3,3	9+4+0
5	(Australia) Ray Cresp	3,1,2,3	9+2
6	(England) Clive Featherby	3,2,2,2	9+1
7	(England) Maury Mattingley	2,3,2,2	9+0
8	(Scotland) Doug Templeton	3,2,3,0	8
9	(England) Ivor Brown	2,1,2,3	8
10	(Australia) Geoff Mudge	1,3,2,1	7
11	(England) Eric Boocock	2,1,1,3	7
12	(England) Jimmy Squibb	2,3,0,1	6
13	(England) Rick France	2,3,0,0	5
14	(England) Ron Bagley	3,0,1,1	5
15	(Australia) Charlie Monk	0,0,3,2	5
16	(England) Colin Pratt	2,2,0,0	4
17	(England) Cliff Cox	1,0,2,1	3
18	(England) Les McGillivray	1,0,0,2	3
19	(England) George Major	0,1,0,2	3
20	(New Zealand) Trevor Redmond	0,1,1,	3
21	(England) John Hart	0,2,0,0	2
22	(England) Ken Adams	0,0,1,1	2
23	(England) Maury McDermott	1,0,1,0	2
24	(England) Norman Hunter	0,1,1,0	2

== Riders & final averages ==
Cradley Heath

- (England) Ivor Brown 10.30
- (England) John Hart 7.84
- (England) Harry Bastable 6.04
- (England) John Edwards 5.98
- (England) Alan Totney 5.55
- (England) Ivor Davies 5.26
- (England) Derek Timms 4.71
- (England) John Belcher 3.70
- (England) Joe Westwood 2.00

Edinburgh

- (Scotland) George Hunter 11.09
- (New Zealand) Wayne Briggs 9.21
- (Scotland) Doug Templeton 9.19
- (Scotland) Willie Templeton 8.09
- (Australia) Ken Cameron 7.64
- (New Zealand) Alf Wells 5.13
- (Scotland) Jimmy Tannock 4.36
- (Scotland) Bill Landels 3.58
- (Australia) Dudley McKean 3.36
- (Scotland) Bill McMillan 2.85

Exeter

- (England) Len Silver 9.58
- (England) Alan Cowland 8.40
- (England) Cliff Cox 8.29
- (England) Francis Cann 7.79
- (England) Pete Lansdale 6.94
- (England) Howdy Byford 5.88
- (England) Dennis Day 5.29
- (England) Pat Flanagan 4.73
- (Scotland) George Summers 4.00
- (England) Gordon Bailey 3.29

Hackney

- (England) Norman Hunter 10.04
- (England) Trevor Hedge 6.67
- (England) Jimmy Heard 6.53
- (New Zealand) Colin McKee 6.47
- (England) Tich Read (George Snailum) 5.70
- (England) Malcolm Simmons 5.33
- (England) John Poyser 4.52
- (England) Pete Sampson 4.27
- (England) Wal Morton 3.77
- (England) Ronnie Rolfe 3.76

Long Eaton

- (Australia) Charlie Monk 9.11
- (England) Danny Dunton 7.80
- (Australia) Bluey Scott 7.16
- (England) Gil Goldfinch 5.58
- (England) Jon Erskine 5.87
- (England) Norman Storer 5.03
- (England) Ken Vale 4.99
- (England) Slant Payling 4.65
- (England) Vic White 4.23
- (England) Tony Eadon 3.75
- (England) Geoff Penniket 3.64

Middlesbrough

- (England) Eric Boothroyd 9.63
- (England) Eric Boocock 8.50
- (England) Dave Younghusband 7.92
- (Guernsey) Johnny Fitzpatrick 6.08
- (England) Clive Hitch 6.08
- (England) John Mills 4.00
- (Australia) Kevin Torpie 3.46
- (England) Allan Butterfield 3.19

Newcastle

- (New Zealand) Ivan Mauger 10.42
- (England) Brian Craven 9.29
- (New Zealand) Bob Duckworth 6.44
- (England) Peter Kelly 6.00
- (England) Mike Watkin 5.84
- (England) Russ Dent 3.50
- (England) Jack Winstanley 3.45
- (New Zealand) Ivan Crozier 2.74

New Cross (withdrew mid-season)

- (England) Jimmy Squibb 9.93
- (England) Stan Stevens 6.72
- (England) Bob Dugard 6.59
- (England) John Dugard 5.16
- (England) Geoff Penniket 5.11
- (England) Reg Reeves 4.67
- (England) Des Lukehurst 3.28
- (England) Eddie Reeves 1.85
- (England) Terry Stone 1.82

Poole

- (Scotland) Ross Gilbertson 9.92
- (Australia) Geoff Mudge 8.98
- (England) Tony Lewis 8.42
- (England) Norman Strachan 7.19
- (England) Pete Smith 5.35
- (England) Tim Bungay 5.31
- (England) Keith Whipp 3.89
- (England) Pete Munday 3.79

Rayleigh

- (England) Les McGillivray 8.47
- (England) Maury McDermott 7.76
- (England) Stan Clark 6.15
- (England) Vic Ridgeon 5.97
- (England) Derek Strutt 5.75
- (England) Harry Edwards 5.74
- (England) Roy Bowers 4.62
- (England) Sandy McGillivray 3.20
- (England) John Mills 2.73

St Austell

- (New Zealand) Trevor Redmond 8.50
- (England) Chris Julian 7.88
- (England) George Major 6.93
- (Australia) Ray Cresp 6.56
- (Canada) Chris Blewett 5.81
- (England) Glyn Chandler 5.44
- (England) Ray Wickett 5.02
- (England) Bob Warner 4.00

Sheffield

- (England) Clive Featherby 10.05
- (England) Jack Kitchen 9.91
- (England) Tommy Roper 7.43
- (England) Ron Bagley 7.10
- (England) Dent Oliver 6.78
- (England) Alan Jay 5.70
- (England) Tony Robinson 5.64
- (England) John Dews 5.61
- (England) Vic Lonsdale (Jack Thorp) 5.57
- (England) Ken Handscombe 2.67

Stoke

- (England) Colin Pratt 9.67
- (England) Pete Jarman 9.13
- (England) Ken Adams 7.47
- (England) Eric Hockaday 7.44
- (Wales) Howard Cole (Kid Bodie) 5.57
- (England) Ron Sharp 4.81
- (England) Roy Bowers 4.47
- (England) Ray Harris 4.14
- (Hungary) Sándor Lévai 2.92

Wolverhampton

- (England) Tommy Sweetman 8.50
- (England) Maury Mattingley 7.88
- (Australia) Graham Warren 7.59
- (England) Dave Hemus 6.93
- (England) Rick France 6.56
- (England) Ernie Baker 5.49
- (Wales) Cyril Francis 5.44
- (England) James Bond 5.02
- (England) Les Jenkins 5.81

== See also ==
- List of United Kingdom Speedway League Champions
- Knockout Cup (speedway)
