= 1964 Provincial Speedway League =

British motorcycle speedway season

- League: Provincial League
- No. of competitors: 12
- Champions: Newcastle Diamonds
- Knockout Cup: Newport Wasps
- Individual: Ivan Mauger
- Northern League: Sheffield Tigers
- Southern League: Poole Pirates
- Highest average: Ivan Mauger
- Division/s above: 1964 National League

The 1964 Provincial Speedway League was the fifth and final season of the Provincial League in the United Kingdom. Twelve speedway teams took part. A second division of British speedway would not return until 1968.

== Season summary ==
The 1964 season started in controversy which led to the Provincial League running 'black'. Officially the 1964 Provincial League season did not exist.

Wolverhampton Wolves refused to move up to the National League after winning the Provincial League title in 1963. The two leagues could not agree about the situation which led to the Provincial League being outlawed by the Speedway Control Board.

All National League riders were forbidden to ride on Provincial League tracks. Provincial League riders were warned by the Speedway Control Board that they were in breach of ACU regulations and could be suspended from all competitive racing. They were also barred from the Speedway World Championship.

The Stoke Potters, St Austell Gulls and Rayleigh Rockets all withdrew from the league for various reasons before the season started. The Sunderland Stars joined the league but then withdrew after riding only three matches. However Glasgow Tigers and the Newport Wasps joined and completed the season.

Newcastle Diamonds won the final Provincial League and their first title. In the early season supplementary league competitions, Sheffield and Poole won the Northern and Southern leagues respectively.

== League ==
=== Final table ===
Pos	Team	M	W	D	L	Pts
1	Newcastle Diamonds	22	17	0	5	34
2	Hackney Hawks	22	15	1	6	31
3	Wolverhampton Wolves	22	12	1	9	25
4	Newport Wasps	22	11	1	10	23
5	Edinburgh Monarchs	22	10	2	10	22
6	Exeter Falcons	22	10	1	11	21
7	Poole Pirates	22	10	1	11	21
8	Sheffield Tigers	22	9	2	11	20
9	Middlesbrough Bears	22	9	2	11	20
10	Cradley Heath Heathens	22	8	1	13	17
11	Long Eaton Archers	22	8	0	14	16
12	Glasgow Tigers	22	6	2	14	14

M = Matches; W = Wins; D = Draws; L = Losses; Pts = Total Points

- Sunderland Saints withdrew after three matches and had their record expunged, although they complete their fixtures in the early season Northern League event.

=== Fixtures and results ===
Home \ Away	CH	ED	EX	GLA	HAC	LE	MID	ND	NW	PP	SHE	WOL
Cradley Heath		43–35	37–41	42–36	36–42	42–36	57–21	41–37	42–36	47–31	41–36	38–40
Edinburgh	44–34		43–35	39–39	45–33	53–22	48–30	38–40	46–32	38–40	52.5–24.5	52–26
Exeter	43–35	45–33		43–35	47–31	48–30	52–26	34–44	46–32	54–24	0–0	38–40
Glasgow	41–37	37–41	41–36		42–36	44–34	37–41	31–46	40–38	39–39	44–34	35–42
Hackney	47–31	53–25	43–34	49–29		47–31	55–23	42–36	39–39	53–25	52–26	42–36
Long Eaton	43–35	32–46	36–42	45–33	38–40		54–24	41–37	44–34	40–38	44–34	40–38
Middlesbrough	39–39	39–39	41–37	41–37	40–38	49–29		34–44	43–35	47–31	45–33	53–25
Newcastle	40–38	49–29	55–23	51–26	37–41	45–33	53–25		48–30	51–27	42–36	44–34
Newport	48–30	42–36	50–28	48–30	51–27	54–23	55–23	33–45		47–31	47–31	44–33
Poole	42–36	42–36	41–37	43–35	35–43	55–23	50–28	41–37	37–41		56–22	43–35
Sheffield	55–23	48–30	56–22	42–36	47–31	44–34	51–27	33–45	50–28	48–30		39–39
Wolverhampton	42–36	42–36	40–38	39–38	33–45	49–29	49–29	37–40	57–21	45–33	50–28	

Legend: Blue = home team win; Yellow = draw; Red = away team win.

=== Top five riders (league only) ===
	Rider	Nat	Team	C.M.A.
1	Ivan Mauger	(New Zealand)	Newcastle	11.54
2	Charlie Monk	(Australia)	Glasgow	10.88
3	Ivor Brown	(England)	Cradley	10.39
4	George Hunter	(Scotland)	Edinburgh	10.31
5	Colin Pratt	(England)	Hackney	10.19

== Provincial League Knockout Cup ==
The 1964 Provincial League Knockout Cup was the fifth edition of the Knockout Cup for the Provincial League teams. Newport Wasps were the winners.

First round

Date	Team one	Score	Team two
18/05	Cradley Heath	51–45	Edinburgh
15/06	Newcastle	53–43	Poole
16/06	Long Eaton	54–42	Middlesbrough
17/06	Glasgow White City	59–37	Sheffield

Second round

Date	Team one	Score	Team two
03/07	Hackney	50–46	Exeter
13/07	Newcastle	62–34	Wolverhampton
17/07	Glasgow White City	46–49	Newport
18/07	Cradley Heath	51–45	Long Eaton

Semi-finals

Date	Team one	Score	Team two
21/08	Newport	56–40	Hackney
19/09	Cradley Heath	54–42	Newcastle

=== Final ===
first leg

25 September 1964

Newport Wasps Peter Vandenberg 13 Dick Bradley 13 Jon Erskine 10 Alby Golden 8 Bob Hughes 5 Vic White 5 Geoff Penniket 4	58–38	Cradley Heath Ivor Brown 12 Harry Bastable 7 George Major 6 John Hart 6 Alan Totney 4 Eric Hockaday 3 John Edwards 0

Somerton Park

second leg

24 October 1964

Cradley Heath Ivor Brown 15 John Edwards 13 John Hart 12 Harry Bastable 7 Eric Hockaday 5 Alan Totney 5 Matt Mattocks 0	57–39	Newport Wasps Peter Vandenberg 11 Dick Bradley 9 Alby Golden 8 Jon Erskine 4 Geoff Penniket 4 Bob Hughes 3 Vic White 0

Dudley Wood Stadium

== Supplementary leagues ==
Northern League

Team	PL	W	D	L	Pts
Sheffield	10	8	0	2	16
Edinburgh	10	5	1	4	11
Newcastle	10	5	1	4	11
Glasgow	10	5	0	5	10
Middlesbrough	10	4	0	6	8
Sunderland	10	2	0	8	4

Southern League

Team	PL	W	D	L	Pts
Poole	12	8	0	4	16
Cradley Heath	12	7	0	5	14
Exeter	12	6	1	5	13
Newport	12	6	0	6	12
Hackney	12	6	0	6	12
Long Eaton	12	5	0	7	10
Wolverhampton	12	3	0	9	6

Home \ Away	ED	GLA	MID	ND	SHE	SUN
Edinburgh		56–21	49–29	50–28	36–41	57–21
Glasgow	41–37		44–34	53–25	49–29	50–28
Middlesbrough	40–37	46–32		37–40	34–44	39–38
Newcastle	39–39	46–29	41–37		40–38	53–25
Sheffield	46–32	59–19	52–26	57–21		58–20
Sunderland	30–47	48–30	24–53	39–37	37–41	

Legend: Blue = home team win; Yellow = draw; Red = away team win.

Home \ Away	CH	EX	HAC	LE	NW	PP	WOL
Cradley Heath		50–28	41–37	48–30	42–36	37–41	41–37
Exeter	60–18		52–26	55–23	42–36	41–37	56–21
Hackney	43–34	42–35		41–37	44–34	52–25	53–25
Long Eaton	37–41	39–37	49.5–27.5		42–36	41–36	36–41
Newport	38–40	45–33	45–33	52–25		40–38	40–37
Poole	50–28	48–30	45–33	57–21	43–35		49–29
Wolverhampton	50–28	31–47	53–25	38–40	38–39	26–52	

Legend: Blue = home team win; Yellow = draw; Red = away team win.

== Riders' Championship ==
Ivan Mauger won the Riders' Championship for the second successive year. The final was held at Hyde Road on 26 September.

Pos.	Rider	Pts	Total
1	(New Zealand) Ivan Mauger	2,3,2,3,3	13+3
2	(Australia) Charlie Monk	1,3,3,3,3	13+2
3	(England) Roy Trigg	3,2,2,2,3	12+3
4	(England) Peter Kelly	3,3,2,2,2	12+2
5	(England) Peter Jarman	1,2,3,2,3	11
6	(England) Ivor Brown	1,1,3,3,1	9
7	(England) Ken Sharples	2,3,1,1,2	9
8	(New Zealand) Bill Andrew	3,0,2,3,0	8
9	(England) Colin Pratt	3,0,0,2,2	7
10	(England) Jimmy Squibb	2,1,0,1,2	6
11	(New Zealand) Trevor Redmond	0,2,1,1,1	5
12	(Australia) Peter Vandenberg	1,0,3,1,0	5
13	(Scotland) George Hunter	0,2,1,0,1	4
14	(Australia) Norman Storer	2,0,0,0,1	3
15	(Australia) Bluey Scott	0,1,1,0,0	2
16	(England) Jon Erskine	0,0,0,0,0	0

== Riders & final averages ==
Cradley Heath

- (England) Ivor Brown 10.39
- (England) George Major 9.01
- (England) John Hart 8.06
- (England) Eric Hockaday 7.37
- (England) Harry Bastable 5.33
- (England) Alan Totney 4.44
- (England) John Edwards 4.57
- (England) Derek Timms 3.27
- (England) Glyn Chandler 3.00
- (England) Fred Priest 2.29
- (Wales) Ivor Hughes 1.00
- (England) Frank Holmes 0.57

Edinburgh

- (Scotland) George Hunter 10.31
- (Scotland) Doug Templeton 9.19
- (New Zealand) Wayne Briggs 8.62
- (Scotland) Willie Templeton 6.17
- (New Zealand) Alf Wells 5.25
- (Scotland) Bill Landels 5.07
- (Scotland) Jimmy Tannock 4.48
- (Australia) Kevin Torpie 4.08
- (Scotland) Bert Harkins 4.00
- (Scotland) Alec Hughson 3.43

Exeter

- (England) Jimmy Squibb 9.71
- (England) Len Silver 9.55
- (England) Tim Bungay 8.71
- (England) Alan Cowland 8.24
- (Canada) Chris Blewett 7.33
- (England) Cliff Cox 6.57
- (England) David Crane 6.15
- (England) Des Lukehurst 5.49
- (England) Maury McDermott 5.36
- (England) Terry Stone 5.33
- (England) Howdy Byford 5.03
- (England) Ray Wickett 4.50
- (England) Pat Flanagan 3.41

Glasgow

- (Australia) Charlie Monk 10.88
- (New Zealand) Trevor Redmond 7.74
- (England) Maury Mattingley 7.53
- (England) Chris Julian 6.67
- (Scotland) Red Monteith 4.00
- (New Zealand) Graham Coombes 3.64
- (Scotland) Bill McMillan 3.59
- (Australia) Bruce Ovenden 3.05
- (England) Terry Stone 2.70
- (England) Vic Ridgeon 2.12

Hackney

- (England) Colin Pratt 10.19
- (England) Roy Trigg 10.04
- (England) Les McGillivray 8.84
- (England) Len Silver 8.57
- (England) John Poyser 6.57
- (England) Jimmy Heard 4.80
- (England) Brian Davies 4.68
- (England) Peter Jackson 4.50
- (England) Dennis Day 3.78
- (England) Sandy McGillivray 3.40
- (England) Malcolm Brown 2.00

Long Eaton

- (England) Eric Boothroyd 8.82
- (England) Eric Boocock 8.80
- (England) Slant Payling 8.00
- (England) Ray Wilson 7.17
- (England) Norman Storer 7.02
- (England) Ken Adams 6.59
- (Wales) Howard Cole (Kid Bodie) 6.05
- (England) Ron Sharp 4.28
- (England) John Mills 4.10
- (England) Ken Vale 3.67

Middlesbrough

- (England) Dave Younghusband 9.07
- (England) Eric Boocock 8.50
- (Australia) Bluey Scott 7.37
- (England) Clive Hitch 5.68
- (England) Ray Day 4.84
- (Australia) Kevin Torpie 4.00
- (England) John Butterfield 3.95
- (England) Ken Handscombe 2.91
- (England) Slant Payling 2.83
- (England) Fred Greenwell 2.57
- (England) Jack Swales 1.47

Newcastle

- (New Zealand) Ivan Mauger 11.54
- (England) Ken Sharples 8.66
- (England) Peter Kelly 8.64
- (New Zealand) Bill Andrew 8.36
- (England) Mike Watkin 6.84
- (England) Russ Dent 5.52
- (New Zealand) Goog Allan 4.65
- (England) Jack Winstanley 3.78
- (England) Maury Robinson 2.67

Newport

- (England) Alby Golden 9.20
- (Netherlands) Peter Vandenberg 8.85
- (England) Dick Bradley 8.23
- (England) Jon Erskine 7.28
- (England) Geoff Penniket 6.60
- (Wales) Bob Hughes 5.30
- (England) Vic White 4.31
- (England) Fred Powell 4.00
- (England) Ray Harris 2.70

Poole

- (Scotland) Ross Gilbertson 8.22
- (Australia) Geoff Mudge 8.39
- (Australia) Chum Taylor 8.13
- (England) Norman Strachan 6.34
- (England) Tony Lewis 6.20
- (England) Tim Bungay 5.74
- (England) Pete Smith 4.96
- (England) Pete Munday 4.69
- (England) Brian Leonard 3.50

Sheffield

- (England) Jack Kitchen 9.96
- (England) Clive Featherby 9.07
- (England) John Dews 8.59
- (England) Dent Oliver 6.56
- (England) Tommy Roper 6.43
- (England) Alan Jay 5.37
- (England) Ron Bagley 4.23
- (England) Ken Handscombe 3.74

Wolverhampton

- (England) Pete Jarman 9.54
- (England) Tommy Sweetman 8.71
- (Wales) Cyril Francis 7.60
- (England) Dave Hemus 7.43
- (Australia) Jim Airey 5.81
- (Australia) Gordon Guasco 5.76
- (New Zealand) Colin McKee 5.57
- (England) James Bond 5.20
- (England) Harry Edwards 3.51
- (England) Chris Harrison 3.00

== See also ==
- List of United Kingdom Speedway League Champions
- Knockout Cup (speedway)
