= 1970 British League season =

British motorcycle speedway season

- League: British League
- No. of competitors: 19
- Champions: Belle Vue Aces
- Knockout Cup: Wimbledon Dons
- Individual: Barry Briggs
- London Cup: Wimbledon Dons
- Midland Cup: Coventry Bees
- Highest average: Ivan Mauger
- Division/s below: British League (Div 2)

The 1970 British League season was the 36th season of the top tier of speedway in the United Kingdom and the sixth season known as the British League.

== Summary ==
Wembley Lions under the promotion of Trevor Redmond and Bernard Cottrel entered the British league having bought the licence – and inherited the riders – from the Coatbridge Monarchs. It was the first time since 1956 that Wembley would compete in the league.

Belle Vue Aces secured their first British League title. The Manchester team were once again led by the brilliant Ivan Mauger who would secure a third consecutive world champion title before the end of the season. He topped the averages with 11.18 as the team finished ten points ahead of their nearest rivals Wimbledon Dons. The Dons found some consolation when winning their third consecutive British League Knockout Cup.

== Final table ==
| Pos | Team | PL | W | D | L | Pts |
|---|---|---|---|---|---|---|
| 1 | Belle Vue Aces | 36 | 27 | 2 | 7 | 56 |
| 2 | Wimbledon Dons | 36 | 22 | 2 | 12 | 46 |
| 3 | Coventry Bees | 36 | 22 | 1 | 13 | 45 |
| 4 | Leicester Lions | 36 | 21 | 0 | 15 | 42 |
| 5 | Poole Pirates | 36 | 20 | 0 | 16 | 40 |
| 6 | Halifax Dukes | 36 | 19 | 1 | 16 | 39 |
| 7 | Sheffield Tigers | 36 | 18 | 3 | 15 | 39 |
| 8 | Glasgow Tigers | 36 | 18 | 1 | 17 | 37 |
| 9 | Wolverhampton Wolves | 36 | 16 | 2 | 18 | 34 |
| 10 | Exeter Falcons | 36 | 16 | 1 | 19 | 34 |
| 11 | Hackney Hawks | 36 | 15 | 2 | 19 | 33 |
| 12 | King's Lynn Stars | 36 | 16 | 0 | 20 | 32 |
| 13 | Oxford Cheetahs | 36 | 16 | 0 | 20 | 32 |
| 14 | Wembley Lions | 36 | 15 | 2 | 19 | 32 |
| 15 | Cradley Heath Heathens | 36 | 15 | 1 | 20 | 31 |
| 16 | Swindon Robins | 36 | 14 | 2 | 20 | 30 |
| 17 | Newcastle Diamonds | 36 | 15 | 0 | 21 | 30 |
| 18 | West Ham Hammers | 36 | 14 | 2 | 20 | 30 |
| 19 | Newport Wasps | 36 | 12 | 0 | 24 | 24 |

M = Matches; W = Wins; D = Draws; L = Losses; Pts = Total Points

== Fixtures and results ==
| Home \ Away | BV | CRA | COV | EX | GLA | HAC | HAL | KL | LEI | ND | NW | OX | PP | SHE | SWI | WEM | WH | WIM | WOL |
|---|---|---|---|---|---|---|---|---|---|---|---|---|---|---|---|---|---|---|---|
| Belle Vue | | 54–23 | 49–29 | 50–28 | 48–30 | 44.5–33.5 | 51–27 | 41–37 | 40–38 | 54–24 | 55–22 | 49–29 | 53–25 | 44–34 | 43–35 | 48–28 | 54–24 | 54–24 | 51–27 |
| Cradley | 34–44 | | 40.5–37.5 | 42–35 | 47–31 | 47–31 | 37–40 | 41–36 | 33–44 | 40–38 | 42–36 | 49–29 | 46–32 | 37–41 | 51–27 | 37–40 | 42–36 | 44–34 | 37–38 |
| Coventry | 40–37 | 51–27 | | 54–24 | 53–25 | 44–33 | 39–39 | 59–19 | 45–33 | 47–31 | 52–26 | 50–28 | 41–37 | 53–25 | 46–32 | 47–31 | 55–23 | 48–29 | 56–22 |
| Exeter | 39–39 | 42–36 | 54–24 | | 44–34 | 54–24 | 45–33 | 57–21 | 51–27 | 41–37 | 42–36 | 37–41 | 43–35 | 43–35 | 46–32 | 47–31 | 46–32 | 41–37 | 49–29 |
| Glasgow | 43–34 | 44–34 | 45–33 | 43–35 | | 53–24 | 45–33 | 47–31 | 41–37 | 48–30 | 59–19 | 44–34 | 48–30 | 44–34 | 39–39 | 45–33 | 43–35 | 43–35 | 58–20 |
| Hackney | 44–34 | 48–30 | 52–26 | 48–30 | 47–30 | | 40–38 | 40–38 | 40–38 | 42–36 | 47–31 | 40–38 | 36–42 | 42–36 | 42–36 | 52–26 | 38–40 | 39–39 | 41–37 |
| Halifax | 37–41 | 45–33 | 49–29 | 52–26 | 42–36 | 43–35 | | 46–32 | 42–36 | 47–31 | 55–23 | 54–24 | 56–22 | 46–32 | 49–28 | 47.5–30.5 | 51–27 | 44–34 | 50–28 |
| King's Lynn | 35–43 | 43–35 | 34–44 | 46–32 | 46–32 | 46–32 | 40–38 | | 37–41 | 40–38 | 51–27 | 48–30 | 42–35 | 41–37 | 42–36 | 49–29 | 56–22 | 37–41 | 41–37 |
| Leicester | 41–37 | 44–34 | 38–40 | 42–35 | 41–37 | 47–31 | 40–38 | 34–43 | | 48–30 | 52–26 | 40–38 | 42–36 | 46–32 | 40–38 | 45–33 | 48–30 | 43–35 | 40–38 |
| Newcastle | 32–46 | 40–38 | 40–38 | 52–26 | 55–23 | 40–38 | 38–40 | 56–22 | 44–34 | | 45–33 | 37–41 | 40–38 | 48–30 | 42–36 | 42–36 | 50–28 | 48–30 | 45–33 |
| Newport | 37–41 | 34–44 | 34–44 | 41–37 | 37–41 | 41–37 | 42–36 | 40–38 | 35–43 | 43–35 | | 49–28 | 37–41 | 38–40 | 44–34 | 45–33 | 45–33 | 34–44 | 42–36 |
| Oxford | 37–41 | 38–40 | 41–37 | 46–32 | 43–35 | 50–28 | 40–38 | 42–36 | 48–30 | 46–32 | 36–42 | | 50–28 | 51–27 | 49–29 | 42–36 | 39.5–38.5 | 32–46 | 42–36 |
| Poole | 40–38 | 49–29 | 42–36 | 44–33 | 41–37 | 51–27 | 43–35 | 39–38 | 45–32 | 48–30 | 35–43 | 51–27 | | 43–34 | 48–30 | 37–41 | 44–34 | 41–37 | 44–34 |
| Sheffield | 40–38 | 39–39 | 34–44 | 44.5–33.5 | 44–34 | 47–31 | 47–31 | 46–32 | 45–33 | 51–27 | 51–27 | 50–28 | 38–40 | | 46–32 | 43–35 | 39–39 | 48–30 | 45–33 |
| Swindon | 38–40 | 33–45 | 42–36 | 57–21 | 40–38 | 41–37 | 41–37 | 40–37 | 43–35 | 51–27 | 56–22 | 43–34 | 37–41 | 39–39 | | 48–29 | 43–35 | 38–40 | 48–30 |
| Wembley | 39–39 | 42–36 | 41–37 | 45–33 | 42–36 | 41–37 | 40–38 | 38–40 | 37–41 | 40–38 | 45–33 | 42–36 | 40–38 | 38–39 | 41–37 | | 47–31 | 41–37 | 39–39 |
| West Ham | 35–43 | 55–23 | 37–41 | 41–36 | 41–37 | 42–36 | 41–37 | 48–30 | 44–34 | 51–27 | 46–32 | 40–38 | 47–30 | 37–41 | 37–41 | 47–31 | | 39–39 | 45–33 |
| Wimbledon | 44–33 | 44–33 | 51–27 | 61–17 | 45–33 | 40–38 | 48–30 | 48–29 | 42–36 | 50–28 | 54–24 | 49–29 | 50–28 | 50–28 | 44–34 | 43–34 | 48–30 | | 48–30 |
| Wolverhampton | 33–45 | 52–26 | 43–35 | 43–35 | 41–37 | 39–39 | 49–29 | 52–26 | 38–40 | 47–31 | 40–38 | 42–36 | 48–30 | 45–33 | 46–32 | 45–33 | 46–31 | 42–36 | |

Legend: Blue = home team win; Yellow = draw; Red = away team win.

== Top ten riders (league averages) ==
| | Rider | Nat | Team | C.M.A. |
|---|---|---|---|---|
| 1 | Ivan Mauger | (New Zealand) | Belle Vue | 11.23 |
| 2 | Anders Michanek | (Sweden) | Newcastle | 10.91 |
| 3 | Jim Airey | (Australia) | Sheffield | 10.82 |
| 4 | Ray Wilson | (England) | Leicester | 10.77 |
| 5 | Nigel Boocock | (England) | Coventry | 10.67 |
| 6 | Eric Boocock | (England) | Halifax | 10.59 |
| 7 | Barry Briggs | (New Zealand) | Swindon | 10.56 |
| 8 | Ole Olsen | (Denmark) | Wolverhampton | 10.27 |
| 9 | Jim McMillan | (Scotland) | Glasgow | 10.26 |
| 10 | Martin Ashby | (England) | Exeter | 10.14 |

== British League Knockout Cup ==
The 1970 Speedway Star British League Knockout Cup was the 32nd edition of the Knockout Cup for tier one teams. Wimbledon Dons were the winners for the third consecutive year. It was the first time that the competition was sponsored by the Speedway Star.

First round

| Date | Team one | Score | Team two |
|---|---|---|---|
| 23/04 | Wimbledon | 44–34 | Hackney |
| 21/04 | Exeter | 51–27 | King's Lynn |
| 21/04 | West Ham | 29–49 | Belle Vue |

Second round

| Date | Team one | Score | Team two |
|---|---|---|---|
| 06/06 | Halifax | 43–35 | Coventry |
| 06/06 | Swindon | 44–34 | Wolverhampton |
| 05/06 | Newport | 35–43 | Leicester |
| 01/06 | Newcastle | 41–37 | Wembley |
| 28/05 | Oxford | 38–40 | Poole |
| 28/05 | Sheffield | 44–34 | Glasgow |
| 28/05 | Wimbledon | 49–29 | Cradley Heath |
| 23/05 | Belle Vue | 49–29 | Exeter |
| 07/05 | Romford | 48–30 | Reading |

Quarter-finals

| Date | Team one | Score | Team two |
|---|---|---|---|
| 25/07 | Belle Vue | 56–22 | Poole |
| 22/07 | Swindon | 46–32 | Leicester |
| 02/07 | Sheffield | 41–37 | Halifax |
| 25/06 | Wimbledon | 46–32 | Newcastle |

Semi-finals

| Date | Team one | Score | Team two |
|---|---|---|---|
| 24/09 | Wimbledon | 44–34 | Swindon |
| 23/09 | Belle Vue | 40–38 | Sheffield |

=== Final ===
First leg

15 October 1970

| Wimbledon Dons Trevor Hedge 12 Ronnie Moore 11 Cyril Maidment 6 Jim Tebby 6 Reg Luckhurst 5 Bob Dugard 4 Peter Murray 4 | 46–31 | Belle Vue Aces Tommy Roper 10 Ivan Mauger 8 Chris Pusey 6 Sören Sjösten 4 Ken Eyre 2 Steve Waplington 1 Mike Hiftle 0 |

Wimbledon Stadium

Second leg

24 October 1970

| Belle Vue Aces Ivan Mauger 12 Sören Sjösten 10 Tommy Roper 6 Mike Hiftle 6 Dave Hemus 4 Chris Pusey 3 Ken Eyre 3 | 44–34 | Wimbledon Dons Ronnie Moore 13 Trevor Hedge 10 Reg Luckhurst 5 Cyril Maidment 2 Jim Tebby 2 Bob Dugard 1 Peter Murray 1 |

Hyde Road Stadium

Wimbledon Dons were declared Knockout Cup Champions, winning on aggregate 80-75.

== Riders' Championship ==
Barry Briggs won the British League Riders' Championship for the sixth consecutive year, held at Hyde Road on 17 October. He won a three way run off for the title.

| Pos. | Rider | Heat Scores | Total |
|---|---|---|---|
| 1 | (New Zealand) Barry Briggs | 3 3 1 3 3 | 13+3 |
| 2 | (Sweden) Anders Michanek | 3 2 3 3 2 | 13+2 |
| 3 | (England) Eric Boocock | 2 3 2 3 3 | 13+1 |
| 4 | (New Zealand) Ronnie Moore | 3 2 3 3 1 | 12 |
| 5 | (New Zealand) Ivan Mauger | 3 1 3 ex 3 | 10 |
| 6 | (England) Nigel Boocock | 2 3 1 2 2 | 10 |
| 7 | (Australia) Jim Airey | 2 3 2 1 1 | 9 |
| 8 | (England) Martin Ashby | 0 1 1 2 3 | 7 |
| 9 | (Norway) Reidar Eide | 2 1 2 1 1 | 7 |
| 10 | (England) Ray Wilson | 0 2 0 2 1 | 5 |
| 11 | (Sweden) Bernt Persson | 1 1 0 1 2 | 5 |
| 12 | (Denmark) Ole Olsen | 1 2 2 0 0 | 5 |
| 13 | (England) Terry Betts | 0 0 0 2 2 | 4 |
| 14 | (Australia) Charlie Monk | 1 0 3 0 0 | 4 |
| 15 | (Sweden) Olle Nygren | 0 0 1 0 0 | 1 |
| 16 | (Sweden) Hasse Holmqvist | 1 0 0 0 0 | 1 |
| 17 | (Hungary) Sándor Lévai (res) | 1 - - - - | 1 |

- ef=engine failure, f=fell, exc=excluded

== Final leading averages ==
| | Rider | Nat | Team | C.M.A. |
|---|---|---|---|---|
| 1 | Ivan Mauger | (New Zealand) | Belle Vue | 11.18 |
| 2 | Anders Michanek | (Sweden) | Newcastle | 10.88 |
| 3 | Jim Airey | (Australia) | Sheffield | 10.86 |
| 4 | Ray Wilson | (England) | Leicester | 10.80 |
| 5 | Nigel Boocock | (England) | Coventry | 10.66 |
| 6 | Eric Boocock | (England) | Halifax | 10.54 |
| 7 | Barry Briggs | (New Zealand) | Swindon | 10.53 |
| 8 | Jim McMillan | (Scotland) | Glasgow | 10.27 |
| 9 | Ole Olsen | (Denmark) | Wolverhampton | 10.25 |
| 10 | Martin Ashby | (England) | Exeter | 10.09 |
| 11 | Trevor Hedge | (England) | Wimbledon | 9.97 |
| 12 | Ronnie Moore | (New Zealand) | Wimbledon | 9.95 |
| 13 | Bob Kilby | (England) | Swindon | 9.68 |
| 14 | Sören Sjösten | (Sweden) | Belle Vue | 9.66 |
| 15 | Bengt Jansson | (Sweden) | Hackney | 9.49 |
| 16 | Bruce Cribb | (New Zealand) | Exeter | 9.47 |
| 17 | Olle Nygren | (Sweden) | West Ham | 9.36 |
| 18 | John Boulger | (Australia) | Leicester | 9.34 |
| 19 | Bernt Persson | (Sweden) | Cradley Heath | 9.29 |
| 20 | Terry Betts | (England) | King's Lynn | 922 |

== London Cup ==
Wimbledon won the London Cup for the third consecutive year.

| Pos | Team | P | W | D | L | F | A | Pts |
|---|---|---|---|---|---|---|---|---|
| 1 | Wimbledon Dons | 4 | 3 | 0 | 1 | 178 | 133 | 6 |
| 2 | Hackney Hawks | 4 | 2 | 0 | 2 | 174 | 138 | 4 |
| 3 | West Ham Hammers | 4 | 1 | 0 | 3 | 129 | 182 | 2 |

| Home \ Away | HAC | WH | WIM |
|---|---|---|---|
| Hackney | | 56–22 | 37–41 |
| West Ham | 33–45 | | 32–46 |
| Wimbledon | 42–36 | 35–42 | |

Legend: Blue = home team win; Yellow = draw; Red = away team win.

== Midland Cup ==
Coventry won the Midland Cup for the second consecutive year. The competition consisted of six teams.

First round

| Team one | Team two | Score |
|---|---|---|
| Wolverhampton | Cradley | 42–36, 35–43 |
| Oxford | Swindon | 37–41, 32–46 |

Semi final round

| Team one | Team two | Score |
|---|---|---|
| Cradley | Coventry | 43–35, 29–49 |
| Swindon | Leicester | 36–41, 33–45 |

Final

First leg

10 October 1970

| Coventry Nigel Boocock 10 Ken McKinlay 9 Rick France 9 Col Cottrell 8 Les Owen 6 Roger Hill 2 Tony Lomas 2 | 46–32 | Leicester Ray Wilson 10 John Boulger 9 Graham Plant 6 John Hart 6 Norman Storer 1 Malcolm Brown 0 Alan Cowland 0 |

Brandon Stadium

Second leg

13 October 1970

| Leicester John Boulger 12 Ray Wilson 11 Graham Plant 6 John Hart 5 Malcolm Brown 4 Norman Storer 3 Alan Cowland 0 | 41–37 | Coventry Tony Lomas 10 Ken McKinlay 8 Nigel Boocock 7 Les Owen 5 Col Cottrell 5 Roger Hill 2 John Harrhy 0 |

Leicester Stadium

Coventry won on aggregate 83–73

== Riders & final averages ==
Belle Vue

- (New Zealand) Ivan Mauger 11.18
- (Sweden) Sören Sjösten 9.66
- (England) Tommy Roper 7.91
- (England) Chris Pusey 7.31
- (England) Dave Hemus 5.79
- (England) Eric Broadbelt 5.33
- (England) Ken Eyre 5.33
- (England) Mike Hiftle 4.25
- (England) Steve Waplington 3.52

Coventry

- (England) Nigel Boocock 10.66
- (Scotland) Ken McKinlay 8.50
- (England) Rick France 7.78
- (England) Les Owen 6.08
- (England) Tony Lomas 5.91
- (England) Roger Hill 5.90
- (England) Col Cottrell 5.66
- (England) Ron Mountford 1.58

Cradley Heath

- (Sweden) Bernt Persson 9.29
- (England) Roy Trigg 8.45
- (England) Colin Pratt 7.75
- (Sweden) Jan Simensen 7.51
- (England) Chris Bass 4.38
- (England) Jimmy Squibb 4.09
- (England) Mike Gardner 3.50
- (England) Ken Wakefield 2.65

Exeter

- (England) Martin Ashby 10.09
- (New Zealand) Bruce Cribb 9.47
- (Czech Republic) Jan Holub I 6.81
- (England) Chris Julian 6.09
- (Australia) Neil Street 5.30
- (Sweden) Bengt Andersson 5.21
- (England) Bob Coles 4.81
- (England) Phil Woodcock 4.62

Glasgow

- (Scotland) Jimmy McMillan 10.27
- (Australia) Charlie Monk 8.53
- (Norway) Oyvind Berg 7.79
- (Scotland) Doug Templeton 5.36
- (Scotland) Willie Templeton 5.33
- (Scotland) Bobby Beaton 5.33
- (Scotland) Bill McMillan 3.64
- (Scotland) Alistair Brady 1.85
- (Scotland) Brian Murray 1.64

Hackney

- (Sweden) Bengt Jansson 9.49
- (Australia) Garry Middleton 8.20
- (Australia) Jack Biggs 6.08
- (England) Bob Andrews 6.01
- (England) Jimmy Gooch 5.96
- (England) Laurie Etheridge 4.83
- (England) Les McGillivray 4.71
- (England) Barry Thomas 3.59

Halifax

- (England) Eric Boocock 10.54
- (Australia) Les Sharpe 8.21
- (England) Dave Younghusband 7.80
- (England) Alan Jay 7.04
- (New Zealand) Colin McKee 5.95
- (Australia) Greg Kentwell 5.80
- (England) Terry Lee 4.27

King's Lynn

- (England) Terry Betts 9.22
- (Wales) Howard Cole (Kid Bodie) 8.49
- (England) Malcolm Simmons 7.58
- (New Zealand) Allan Brown 5.05
- (England) Alan Bellham 4.97
- (England) Clive Featherby 4.44
- (England) Ian Turner 4.36
- (England) Arthur Price 4.32
- (England) David Crane 3.31

Leicester

- (England) Ray Wilson 10.80
- (Australia) John Boulger 9.34
- (England) Graham Plant 6.72
- (England) Norman Storer 5.71
- (England) John Hart 5.04
- (England) Malcolm Brown 4.76
- (England) Alan Cowland 4.51
- (England) Tom Leadbitter 3.43

Newcastle

- (Sweden) Anders Michanek 10.88
- (Scotland) George Hunter 7.88
- (New Zealand) Dave Gifford 6.62
- (Australia) Geoff Curtis 5.15
- (England) Mike Watkin 4.30
- (England) Russ Dent 4.06
- (Norway) Dag Lövaas 3.91

Newport

- (Hungary) Sándor Lévai 8.45
- (New Zealand) Bill Andrew 7.78
- (Norway) Edgar Stangeland 6.38
- (Sweden) Bengt Brannefors 4.57
- (Wales) Bob Hughes 4.34
- (England) Jon Erskine 4.09
- (England) Norman Strachan 3.91
- (England) Brian Leonard 3.77
- (Scotland) Ross Gilbertson 2.24

Oxford

- (Sweden) Hasse Holmqvist 9.10
- (England) Ronnie Genz 7.03
- (England) Colin Gooddy 6.66
- (England) Pete Jarman 6.48
- (New Zealand) Rick Timmo 6.38
- (England) Eddie Reeves 5.89
- (England) Mick Bell 4.76
- (England) Peter Seaton 2.82

Poole

- (Australia) Geoff Mudge 7.93
- (Australia) Gordon Guasco 7.72
- (Norway) Odd Fossengen 7.39
- (England) Pete Smith 7.29
- (England) Mike Cake 5.84
- (Poland) Ted Laessing 4.76
- (New Zealand) Frank Shuter 4.70
- (England) Mike Vernam 2.36

Sheffield

- (Australia) Jim Airey 10.86
- (England) Arnold Haley 8.88
- (Sweden) Bengt Larsson 7.03
- (England) Bob Paulson 5.32
- (England) John Dews 5.20
- (England) Brian Maxted 4.27
- (England) Dave Baugh 3.23
- (England) Doug Wyer 2.54

Swindon

- (New Zealand) Barry Briggs 10.53
- (England) Bob Kilby 9.68
- (England) Clive Hitch 5.58
- (England) Barry Duke 5.26
- (England) Pete Munday 4.57
- (England) Mike Keen 4.34
- (England) John Bishop 3.45

Wembley

- (Norway) Reidar Eide 9.10
- (Sweden) Ove Fundin 7.93
- (Scotland) Bert Harkins 7.31
- (New Zealand) Wayne Briggs 5.85
- (England) Dave Jessup 4.76
- (England) Brian Leonard 4.17
- (England) Des Lukehurst 3.82
- (England) Tim Bungay 3.26
- (Sweden) Bengt Andersson 2.43

West Ham

- (Sweden) Olle Nygren 9.36
- (Sweden) Christer Löfqvist 7.82
- (England) Tony Clarke 7.45
- (Australia) Peter Bradshaw 5.62
- (England) Stan Stevens 5.38
- (Norway) Sverre Harrfeldt 4.63
- (England) Martyn Piddock 4.61
- (Australia) Garry Hay 4.25
- (Czech Republic) Antonín Kasper Sr. 4.15
- (England) Barry Crowson 3.56

Wimbledon

- (England) Trevor Hedge 9.97
- (New Zealand) Ronnie Moore 9.95
- (England) Reg Luckhurst 7.74
- (England) Cyril Maidment 6.67
- (England) Jim Tebby 6.34
- (England) Gary Everett 5.93
- (England) Peter Murray 4.25
- (England) Bob Dugard 3.78
- (England) Nigel Rackett 2.33

Wolverhampton

- (Denmark) Ole Olsen 10.25
- (England) Norman Hunter 7.33
- (Netherlands) Peter Vandenberg 6.62
- (England) James Bond 5.31
- (England) Mick Handley 5.29
- (England) Geoff Ambrose 5.23
- (England) Jon Erskine 5.12
- (England) Peter Jackson 4.07

== See also ==
- List of United Kingdom Speedway League Champions
- Knockout Cup (speedway)
