= 1962 Provincial Speedway League =

British motorcycle speedway season

- League: Provincial League
- No. of competitors: 13
- Champions: Poole Pirates
- Knockout Cup: Exeter Falcons
- Individual: Len Silver
- Northern League: Sheffield Tigers
- Southern League: Poole Pirates
- Midland League: Wolverhampton Wolves
- Highest average: Ivor Brown
- Division/s above: 1962 National League

The 1962 Provincial Speedway League was the third season of the Provincial League.

== Summary ==
Thirteen speedway teams took part. Bradford, at their new venue at Greenfields Stadium, returned to the league after missing the previous season due to delays building their new track. The league season proved to be disastrous for Bradford and the club folded at the end of the year. New team Neath Welsh Dragons joined the league and Leicester joined after dropping down from the National League. Neath, near Port Talbot in Wales, was not a successful venue and many of their fixtures were raced at St. Austell. Rayleigh Rockets withdrew with promoters Wally Mawdsley and Pete Lansdale citing falling gates and rider wage demands.

Poole won the league championship for the second year in a row. The Neath Welsh Dragons achieved what was described as the impossible by finishing second in the league standings.

The supplementary cup competitions were won by Sheffield, Poole and Wolverhampton respectively.

== League ==
=== Final table ===
Pos	Team	M	W	D	L	Pts
1	Poole Pirates	24	17	0	7	34
2	Neath Welsh Dragons	24	14	1	9	29
3	Exeter Falcons	24	14	0	10	28
4	Stoke Potters	24	14	0	10	28
5	Edinburgh Monarchs	24	12	2	10	26
6	Plymouth Devils	24	12	2	10	26
7	Sheffield Tigers	24	12	1	11	25
8	Cradley Heath Heathens	24	12	0	12	24
9	Newcastle Diamonds	24	12	0	12	24
10	Wolverhampton Wolves	24	11	1	12	23
11	Middlesbrough Bears	24	11	0	13	22
12	Leicester Hunters	24	6	0	18	12
13	Bradford Panthers	24	5	1	18	11

M = Matches; W = Wins; D = Draws; L = Losses; Pts = Total Points

=== Fixtures and results ===
Home \ Away	BRA	CH	ED	EX	LEI	MID	ND	NEW	PLY	PP	SHE	STO	WOL
Bradford		45–33	32–46	29–49	49–28	44–34	32–46	38–40	42–36	34–41	39–39	41–37	34–43
Cradley Heath	50–28		43–35	45–32	48–30	44–34	38–40	52–26	49–29	40–38	56–22	36–42	46–32
Edinburgh	51–26	50–28		48–29	47–31	41–37	42–36	48–29	38–39	37–41	40–38	43–34	34–44
Exeter	57–21	56–22	44–34		51–27	49–29	43–34	60–18	44–34	43–35	46–32	45–33	61–14
Leicester	56–22	37–41	30–45	48–30		40–38	32–44	51–27	32–46	32–45	37–41	48–30	51.5–26.5
Middlesbrough	48–29	42–36	54–24	55–23	51–27		49–29	37–31	49–29	34–44	44–34	50–28	41–37
Neath	51–27	34–44	42–36	34–44	50–28	49–29		44–34	47–31	36–42	41–36	50–28	47–31
Newcastle	51–27	45–32	40–38	51–26	46–30	35–43	37–40		47–29	40–38	44.5–31.5	41–37	28–50
Plymouth	44–34	45–33	39–39	42–36	41–37	46–32	39–39	38–37		43–34	42–36	43–25	55–22
Poole	55–23	54–23	47–30	58–19	54–24	47–31	38–40	54–24	45–32		48–30	52–25	62–16
Sheffield	45–33	47–31	36–42	43–35	49–29	49–29	49–29	54–24	54–23	42–36		46–32	61–15
Stoke	53–24	47–31	46–32	45–33	60–18	41–36	42–35	43–35	41–36	45–33	46–32		44–33
Wolverhampton	56–22	40–36	39–39	52–26	55–23	46–32	45–33	36–42	50–28	37–40	48–30	33–45	

Legend: Blue = home team win; Yellow = draw; Red = away team win.

=== Top five riders (league only) ===
	Rider	Nat	Team	C.M.A.
1	Ivor Brown	(England)	Cradley	10.21
2	Clive Featherby	(England)	Sheffield	10.21
3	Eric Boothroyd	(England)	Middlesbrough	10.15
4	Geoff Mudge	(Australia)	Poole	10.04
5	Jimmy Squibb	(England)	Plymouth	9.74

== Provincial League Knockout Cup ==
The 1962 Provincial League Knockout Cup was the third edition of the Knockout Cup for the Provincial League teams. Exeter Falcons were the winners.

First round

Date	Team one	Score	Team two
18/06	Newcastle	74–22	Sheffield
21/06	Middlesbrough	66–30	Cradley Heath
22/06	Leicester	32–64	Poole
22/06	Bradford	57–39	Neath
23/06	Edinburgh	71–25	Wolverhampton

Second round

Date	Team one	Score	Team two
11/08	Edinburgh	54–42	Middlesbrough
11/08	Stoke	61–31	Newcastle
14/08	Bradford	44–52	Poole
27/08	Exeter	53–43	Plymouth

Semi-finals

Date	Team one	Score	Team two
10/09	Exeter	57–39	Edinburgh
15/09	Stoke	49–47	Poole

=== Final ===
Date	Team one	Score	Team two
20/10	Stoke	60–36	Exeter
22/10	Exeter	70–26	Stoke

== Supplemetary leagues ==
Northern League

Team	PL	W	D	L	Pts
Sheffield	8	6	1	1	13
Middlesbrough	8	4	0	4	8
Edinburgh	8	4	0	4	8
Newcastle	8	4	0	4	8
Bradford	8	1	1	6	3

Southern League

Team	PL	W	D	L	Pts
Poole	6	6	0	0	12
Exeter	6	2	1	3	5
Plymouth	6	2	1	3	5
Neath	6	1	0	5	2

Home \ Away	BRA	ED	MID	NEW	SHE
Bradford		39–39	38–39	41–37	38–40
Edinburgh	47–31		39–38	53–25	39–39
Middlesbrough	42–35	46–32		35–43	48–30
Newcastle	48–30	44–32	40–38		37.5–39.5
Sheffield	55–22	56–22	48–30	59–19	

Legend: Blue = home team win; Yellow = draw; Red = away team win.

Home \ Away	EX	ND	PLY	PP
Exeter		51–26	39–39	38–40
Neath	34–44		41–37	31–47
Plymouth	43–35	46–32		35–39
Poole	52–25	56–22	51–26	

Legend: Blue = home team win; Yellow = draw; Red = away team win.

Midland League

Team	PL	W	D	L	Pts
Wolverhampton	6	4	0	2	8
Cradley Heath	6	3	0	3	6
Leicester	6	3	0	3	6
Stoke	6	2	1	4	5

Home \ Away	CH	LEI	STO	WOL
Cradley Heath		50–28	49–29	56–22
Leicester	44–34		42–36	41–37
Stoke	42–36	42–36		34–44
Wolverhampton	40–38	43–35	56–22	

Legend: Blue = home team win; Yellow = draw; Red = away team win.

== Riders' Championship ==
Len Silver won the Riders' Championship. The final was held at Hyde Road on 22 September in front of 20,000 spectators. Four riders finished on 11 points forcing a race off.

Pos.	Rider	Pts	Total
1	(England) Len Silver	2 3 3 3	11+3
2	(New Zealand) Wayne Briggs	3 2 3 3	11+2
3	(England) Brian Craven	3 3 2 3	11+1
4	(England) Guy Allott	3 2 3 3	11+0
5	(Australia) Geoff Mudge	2 2 2 3	9
6	(England) Ron Bagley	3 2 2 2	9
7	(England) Norman Hunter	3 3 1 2	9
8	(Scotland) Doug Templeton	1 1 3 3	8
9	(New Zealand) Brian McKeown	2 3 1 1	7
10	(England) Ivor Brown	1 3 1 2	7
11	(England) Pete Lansdale	1 1 1 3	6
12	(England) Eric Hockaday	1 3 0 2	6
13	(England) Jimmy Squibb	f 2 2 2	6
14	(England) Clive Featherby	3 f 1 1	5
15	(England) Cliff Cox	0 2 2 1	5
16	(New Zealand) Bill Andrew	0 2 3 0	5
17	(Australia) Graham Warren	1 0 0 2	3
18	(Scotland) George Hunter	2 1 - -	3
19	(England) Eric Boothroyd	2 0 1 0	3
20	(New Zealand) Trevor Redmond	2 ef 1 0	3
21	(England) Eric Boocock	1 1 0 0	2
22	(Scotland) Willie Templeton	0 1 0 ef	1
23	(Australia) Charlie Monk	0 1 0 0	1
24	(England) Howdy Byford (res)	0 0 1	1
25	(England) Ernie Baker (res)	0 1	1
26	(England) Reg Duval	0 - - - -	0

- f=fell, r-retired, exc=excluded, ef=engine failure

== Riders & final averages ==
Bradford

- (England) Tommy Roper 7.10
- (England) Reg Duval 6.23
- (England) Geoff Pymar 5.89
- (England) Peter Kelly 5.82
- (England) Wal Morton 5.66
- (England) Dave Gerrard 5.60
- (England) Ray Day 5.40
- (England) Stuart Hickman 3.56
- (England) Dennis Jenkins 3.40
- (England) Malcolm Bruce 2.67

Cradley Heath

- (England) Ivor Brown 10.21
- (England) Harry Bastable 7.91
- (England) John Hart 6.80
- (England) Ivor Davies 6.59
- (England) Nick Nicholls 6.56
- (England) Stan Stevens 6.45
- (England) Derek Timms 5.49
- (England) Alan Totney 3.82
- (England) George Bewley 3.13

Edinburgh

- (Scotland) Doug Templeton 9.36
- (New Zealand) Wayne Briggs 8.45
- (Scotland) Dick Campbell 7.05
- (Scotland) George Hunter 7.66
- (Scotland) Willie Templeton 6.67
- (New Zealand) Alf Wells 6.24
- (Scotland) Jimmy Cox 4.44
- (Australia) Dudley McKean 3.94
- (Scotland) Jimmy Tannock 3.80

Exeter

- (England) Len Silver 8.97
- (England) Pete Lansdale 8.00
- (England) Howdy Byford 7.31
- (England) Francis Cann 6.68
- (England) Eric Howe 6.20
- (England) Dennis Day 6.04
- (England) Alan Cowland 5.64

Leicester

- (England) Norman Hunter 7.85
- (England) Eric Hockaday 7.25
- (England) Derek Strutt 6.58
- (England) Rick France 6.36
- (England) Vic White 6.24
- (England) Slant Payling 5.57
- (England) Harry Edwards 5.35
- (England) Bil Osborne 4.50
- (England) Trevor Hedge 4.46
- (England) John Poyser 3.59

Middlesbrough

- (England) Eric Boothroyd 10.15
- (New Zealand) Brian McKeown 8.83
- (Guernsey) Johnny Fitzpatrick 7.38
- (England) Eric Boocock 6.36
- (England) Clive Hitch 5.49
- (England) Dave Younghusband 4.33
- (Australia) Kevin Torpie 3.20
- (England) Bob Webb 2.18

Neath

- (New Zealand) Trevor Redmond 9.43
- (Australia) Charlie Monk 7.74
- (South Africa) Howdy Cornell 7.47
- (England) Roy Taylor 7.44
- (England) Jon Erskine 6.73
- (England) George Major 5.78
- (England) Glyn Chandler 5.26
- (England) Fred Powell 2.46

Newcastle

- (England) Brian Craven 9.60
- (England) Gil Goldfinch 7.76
- (New Zealand) Bill Andrew 6.70
- (England) Mike Watkin 6.38
- (England) Don Wilkinson 6.15
- (England) Vic Lonsdale (Jack Thorp) 5.79
- (New Zealand) Ivan Crozier 5.09
- (England) Pete Sampson 4.25
- (South Africa) George Glen 4.05
- (England) Russ Dent 3.20

Plymouth

- (England) Jimmy Squibb 9.74
- (England) Cliff Cox 8.87
- (England) Chris Julian 7.31
- (Canada) Chris Blewett 6.84
- (England) Maury Mattingley 5.96
- (England) Bert Roger 5.63
- (England) Ivor Toms 3.25
- (Scotland) George Summers 2.87
- (England) Ray Wickett 2.42

Poole

- (Australia) Geoff Mudge 10.04
- (England) Tony Lewis 9.30
- (Scotland) Ross Gilbertson 8.41
- (England) Tim Bungay 7.78
- (England) Roy Trigg 7.54
- (England) Norman Strachan 6.74
- (England) Bobby Croombs 6.05
- (England) Pete Munday 3.25

Sheffield

- (England) Clive Featherby 10.21
- (England) Tony Robinson 9.60
- (England) Guy Allott 9.58
- (England) Ron Bagley 7.98
- (England) Ronnie Rolfe 6.11
- (Australia) Derrol Melbin 3.76
- (England) John Dews 3.35
- (England) Jack Winstanley 3.30
- (England) Alan Jay 2.97

Stoke

- (England) Eric Hockaday 8.69
- (England) Ken Adams 8.67
- (England) Pete Jarman 7.95
- (England) Jimmy Heard 7.65
- (England) Colin Pratt 6.20
- (England) Ron Sharp 5.66
- (England) John Edwards 4.93
- (Wales) Howard Cole (Kid Bodie) 4.56
- (England) Bill Wainwright 3.43
- (England) Ray Harris 3.38

Wolverhampton

- (England) Tommy Sweetman 8.67
- (Australia) Graham Warren 8.13
- (England) Ernie Baker 7.28
- (England) Vic Ridgeon 6.52
- (Wales) Cyril Francis 6.26
- (England) Derek Strutt 6.16
- (England) Les Jenkins 4.70
- (England) Bill Bridgett 4.47
- (England) Erol Brook 3.85
- (England) Terry Stone 1.47

== See also ==
- List of United Kingdom Speedway League Champions
- Knockout Cup (speedway)
