= Dave Hemus =

British motorcycle speedway rider

- Born: 10 June 1938; Birmingham, England
- Died: March 2022 (aged 83)
- Nationality: British (English)

Career history
- 1963–1968: Wolverhampton Wolves
- 1969–1971, 1973: Belle Vue Aces
- 1972: Exeter Falcons

Team honours
- 1970, 1971: league champion (tier 1)
- 1963: league champion (tier 2)

David John Hemus (born 10 June 1938 – March 2022) was an international motorcycle speedway rider from England. He earned one international cap for the Great Britain national speedway team.

== Biography ==
Hemus, born in Birmingham, started as a cycle speedway rider before moving up to motorcycle speedway in 1962, riding a couple of matches for Wolverhampton Wolves during the latter part of the season after being signed by Bill Bridgett for £25. He was then appointed as a full-time member of the track maintenance staff. He began his British leagues career riding for the Wolves during the 1963 Provincial Speedway League. The season ended in success after the team won the Provincial League title. The following season in 1964, he improved his average to 7.43.

Hemus suffered a compound fracture of his left leg in late 1964, which forced him to miss the entire 1965 season. Hemus would continue to ride for Wolves for six years in total, until the end of the 1968 season and made 134 official appearances.

In 1969, Hemus was allocated to the Newport Wasps by the British League Promoters' Association but he eventually joined Belle Vue Aces for the season. He was part of the Belle Vue team that won the league title during the 1970 British League season and 1971 British League season. After winning the league twice with the Manchester club, he spent the winter in Rhodesia before being forced to leave Belle Vue, due to the points limits. He was allocated to Ipswich Witches but then joined Exeter Falcons for the 1972 season. His final season was in 1973, and when he opted not to join the Oxford Rebels he only managed a few rides for Belle Vue before emigrating to Rhodesia.

Hemus died in March 2022.
