= Brian McKeown (speedway rider) =

New Zealand speedway rider

- Born: 12 June 1927; Christchurch, New Zealand
- Died: 24 February 1998 (aged 70); Christchurch, New Zealand

Career history
- 1952–1954, 1963: Southampton Saints
- 1962–1963: Middlesbrough Bears

Individual honours
- 1953: Geoff Revett Trophy

Brian Robert McKeown (12 June 1927 – 24 February 1998) was a New Zealand international motorcycle speedway rider. He earned 3 caps for the New Zealand national speedway team.

== Speedway career ==
McKeown began riding speedway at the Aranui stadium in Christchurch, New Zealand, on 4 February 1950. He made good progress in the following two years and in the 1951–52 season was included in the Canterbury team which competed in the New Zealand speedway league. In 1952, he decided to give up his work as a carpenter and go to England. When he arrived he did not have an offer of a team place but after a successful trial was signed by the Southampton Saints. He made his debut on 27 May and he proved to be one of the finds of the season in the Southern League, achieving an average of over 8 points a match. To supplement his income, he worked on road works laying tarmac and during the summer to save money he camped under the stands at Southampton with two other Saints riders, Ern Brecknell and Mike Tams.

In 1953, McKeown made his international debut for New Zealand in the series against England at the second test at Bristol, but in September that year he broke his leg in a fall. In 1954, he was late starting the season because of his leg injury but was again the top scorer in the Southampton side that year. In November, on his way home to New Zealand, he stopped off at Perth and rode at the Claremont track. He them moved to Adelaide and rode at Rowley Park for a few weeks. On 31 December he rode in a meeting in Melbourne.

For the next seven years, McKeown lived in Christchurch where he ran a newspaper delivery business. He continued to ride speedway in New Zealand and won the Canterbury Championship in 1955–56 and 1956–57. He also represented New Zealand in the two tests with England at Christchurch in 1956. Somewhat surprisingly in 1962 at the age of 34 he decided to return to England and ride for the Middlesbrough Bears in the Provincial League. He quickly regained his old form and had a successful season finishing ninth overall in the Provincial League averages. The following year began promisingly with the prospect of another season with Middlesbrough, and he was also called up by the Southampton Saints to provide injury cover. However, at the start of the season he was sidelined for a few weeks with motor problems. When he did return, he scored well in three meetings for Middlesbrough before being involved in a crash in a second half race with Wayne Briggs at Southampton. He suffered a double fracture of his left leg in the accident which was career ending. In 1964 he managed the Newport Wasps team.

== Later life ==
After this, McKeown returned to New Zealand and settled in the suburb of New Brighton in Christchurch where he set up a lawn mower repair business. From 1966 to 1972, he was the referee at the Templeton speedway track and officiated at a number of national championships and test matches during this period.
