= Provincial League Riders' Championship =

- Sport: Speedway
- Founded: 1960
- Folded: 1965
- Country: United Kingdom

Notes
- replaced by the British League Division Two Riders Championship Replaced; Southern Area League Riders' Championship

The Provincial League Riders Championship was a contest between the top riders (or two riders) with the highest average points total from each speedway club competing in the Provincial League in the United Kingdom. Held in each year that the league existed - between 1960 and 1964. The competition was superseded by the British League Division Two Riders Championship in 1968. The Provincial League had merged with the National League in 1965, to form the British League.

== Past winners ==
Year	Winner	Team	Venue
1960	(New Zealand) Trevor Redmond	Bristol Bulldogs	Cradley Heath
1961	(England) Reg Reeves	Rayleigh Rockets	Harringay
1962	(England) Len Silver	Exeter Falcons	Belle Vue
1963	(New Zealand) Ivan Mauger	Newcastle Diamonds	Belle Vue
1964	(New Zealand) Ivan Mauger	Newcastle Diamonds	Belle Vue

== See also ==
- List of United Kingdom Speedway League Riders' champions
- Speedway Provincial League
