= Hackney Speedway =

Defunct motorcycle speedway team in London

Club information
- Track address: Hackney Wick Stadium; Waterden Road; Hackney; London
- Country: England
- Founded: 1935
- Closed: 1996
- League: National League; Provincial League; British League; Premier League

Major team honours
| KO Cup tier 1 winners | 1971 |
| National League tier 2 champions | 1938, 1988 |
| KO Cup tier 2 winners | 1984, 1988 |
| London Cup | 1936, 1971, 1973, 1979, 1981, 1986, 1989 |
| Pairs championship | 1991 |

Hackney Speedway opened in 1935 at Hackney Wick Stadium, Waterden Road, London, and operated until 1996. The team raced under various names, known as Hackney Wick Wolves, Hackney Hawks, Hackney Kestrels and London Lions.

== History ==
=== Origins & 1930s ===
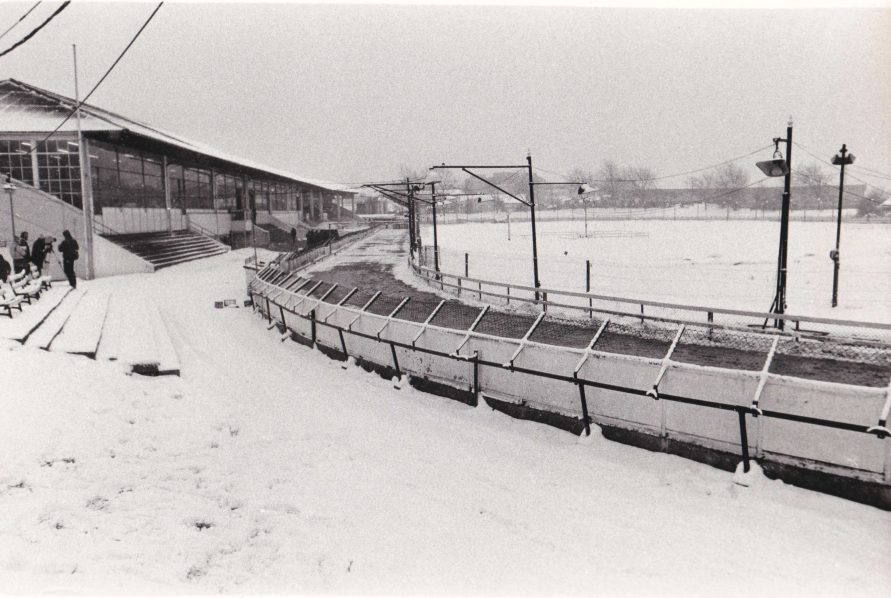
Hackney Wick Stadium in 1979

A turbulent 1935 season for Lea Bridge and Walthamstow Wolves resulted in the relocation of the speedway into Hackney Stadium, with the team riding as the Hackney Wick Wolves. The track measuring 310 metres, was granted a licence by the Speedway Control Board.

The first meeting was held on 26 April 1935, although the first official meeting was a week later on 3 May, when Hackney lost to the New Cross Lambs in the National League. Australian Dicky Case starred for the team that finished 5th in the league. The following season was overshadowed by the death of Hackney rider Dusty Haigh on 15 May 1936, he died from a broken skull in a crash at the track after falling whilst in the lead and being struck by another rider's machine. Meanwhile, Dicky Case qualified for the first ever Speedway World Championship final at Wembley in 1936, but decided to retire at the end of the 1937 season.

Crowds were not large enough to support top level speedway so, in 1938, Hackney swapped licences with the Bristol Bulldogs and dropped down to the second tier. This meant the big name stars at the Wick went too. However, the Wolves won the 1938 Speedway National League Division Two that season, led by their number 1 rider Frank Hodgson who averaged 10.06. The speedway ceased during 1939 following the suspension of the league due to the outbreak of World War II.

=== 1960s ===
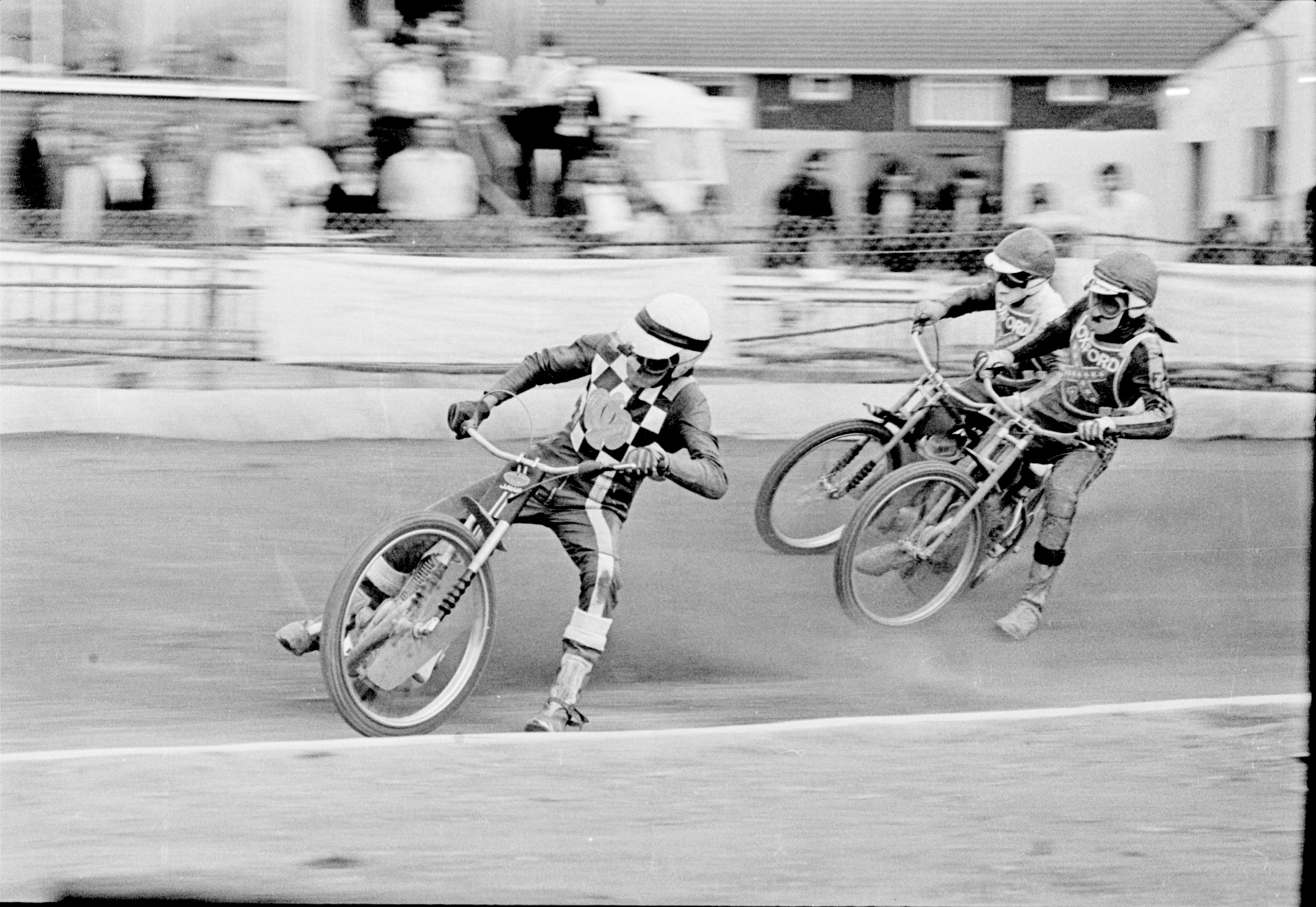
Hackney Hawks at Oxford circa.1974

Hackney Stadium did not host speedway again until 1963 when the Hackney Hawks were formed by promoters Mike Parker and Reg Fearman, the team joined the Provincial League and finished 10th in their debut season in the 1963 Provincial Speedway League. The promotion was then sold to rider/promoter Len Silver who was the club's promoter for the next twenty seasons. The riders and track staff marched onto the track to the sound of the theme tune of the film The Magnificent Seven and that tune inspires more memories for Hackney Hawks fans than anything else. The Hawks were closely linked with sister track the Rayleigh Rockets and latterly the Rye House Rockets. The Hawks finished runner-up to Newcastle Diamonds in 1964 before becoming founder members of the new British League in 1965. Swede Bengt Jansson was brought into the club and together with Colin Pratt they nearly won the 1968 league title, only losing out on points difference to Coventry Bees.

=== 1970s ===
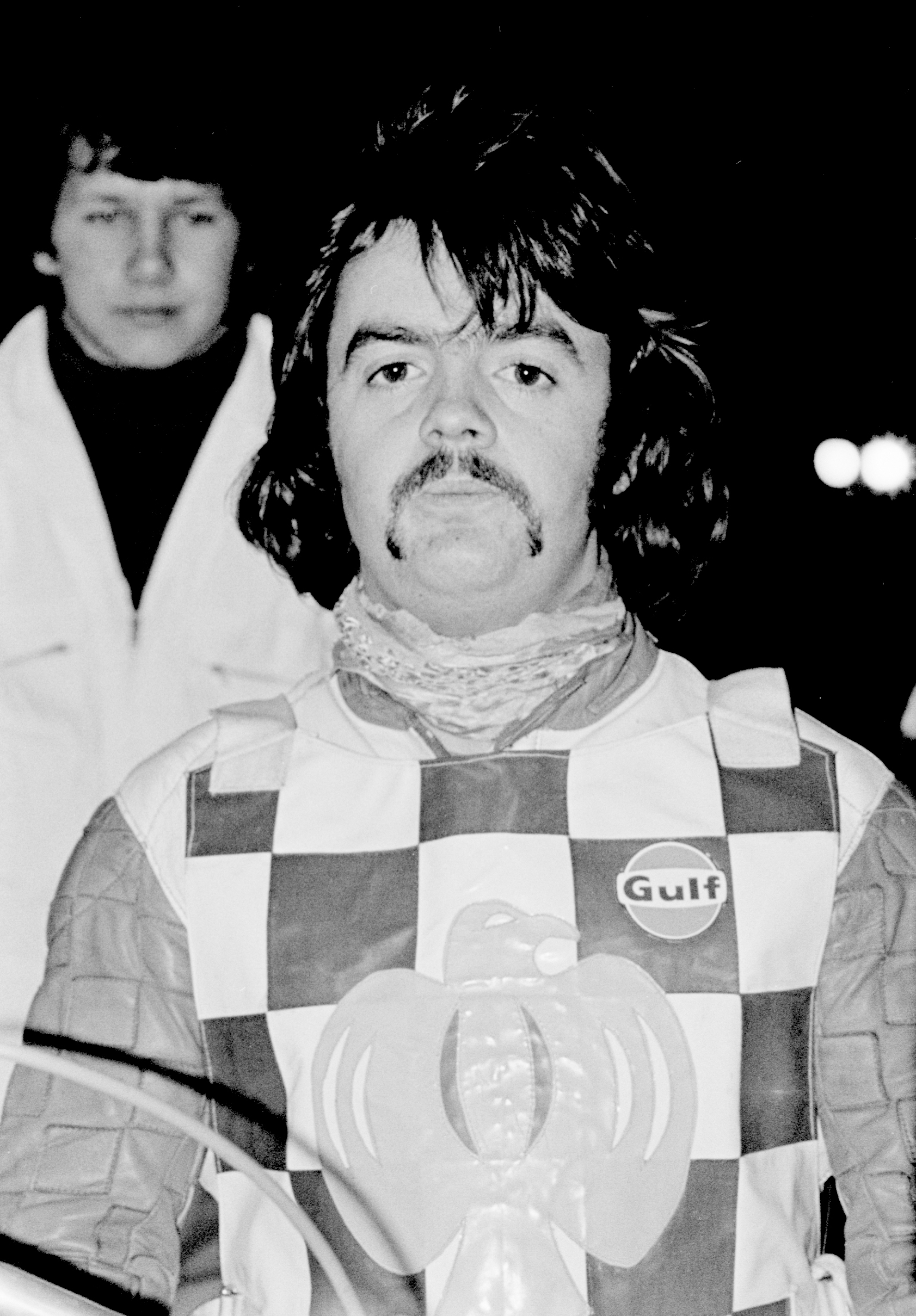
Dave Morton

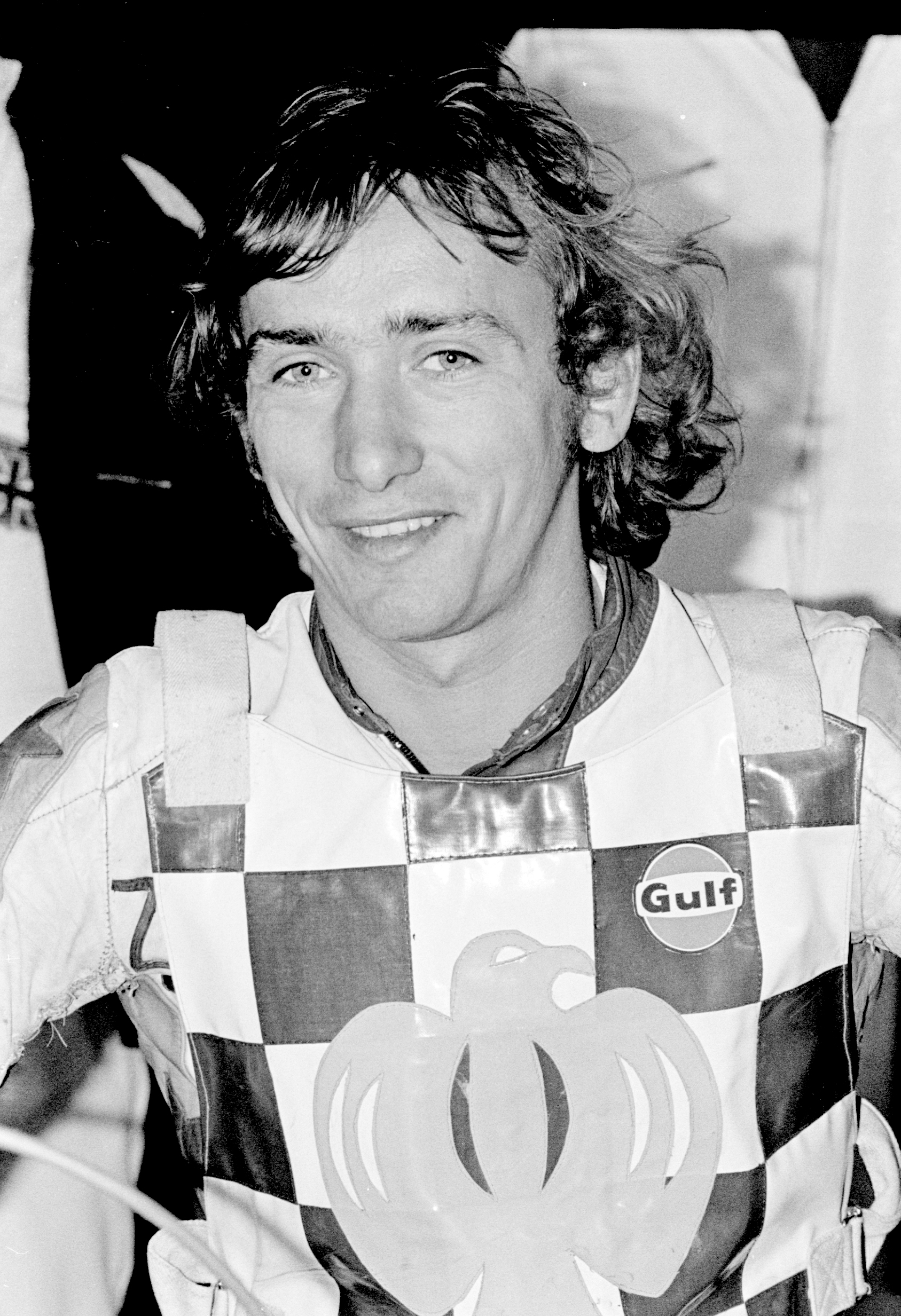
Zenon Plech

In 1971, Hackney won their first major honour when they beat Cradley Heath Heathens to win the British League Knockout Cup. The team also won the London Cup in 1971 and 1973.

The remainder of the decade was relatively average with a best finish of 7th in 1976. Riders leading the team during the period included Dag Lövaas, Dave Morton and Zenon Plech. The decade ended tragically after popular rider Vic Harding was killed on 8 June 1979, whilst racing for the team. A Vic Harding Memorial Trophy meeting was held in his memory in the seasons following his death.

=== 1980s ===
The team finished runner-up again during the 1980 British League season with Danish duo Bo Petersen and Finn Thomsen adding valuable support to Plech. At the completion of the 1983 British League season there was major disruption after Oxford Cheetahs bought Len Silver's division 1 licence. This led to the Crayford Kestrels promotion transferring their licence to race at Hackney because their home at Crayford & Bexleyheath Stadium had closed. The team became known as the Hackney Kestrels.

During their first season as the Kestrels in the 1984 National League season and led by Barry Thomas and Trevor Banks, the team finished 4th and won the Knockout Cup (div 2).

The Kestrels competed in the highest league for a one-off season in 1987 and signed Simon Wigg but dropped back down again in 1988. The decision proved to be wise as the Kestrels won the Division 2 League Championship, winning twenty-six of their thirty league matches and the Knockout Cup for the second time, beating the Wimbledon Dons on aggregate in the final. Young English riders Mark Loram, Andy Galvin and Chris Louis starred.

=== 1990s ===
A 5th-place finish in 1990 and a pairs success by Steve Schofield and Andy Galvin was followed by the team reverting to the Hawks nickname for the 1991 season. Unfortunately promoter Derek Howes withdrew the team from the league mid-season, citing injuries and the recession.

Hackney Stadium underwent financial turmoil followed by significant development from 1991 to 1994, with a new £14 million scheme to develop the neglected stadium. The new stadium opened in October 1995 but went into receivership the same evening. Under the receivers a new speedway promotion arrived when Ivan Henry and Terry Russell moved their Arena Essex Hammers team to Hackney and rode as the London Lions. Team manager for that season was former Hackney rider Colin Pratt. The Lions finished the season in ninth place (out of nineteen), At the end of the 1996 season, there was no stadium owner and speedway was never seen at the stadium again.

=== 2010s ===
The Hackney Hawks name was revived again during the 2011 National League speedway season (third-tier league), as a joint promotion between the promotions at Lakeside and Rye House with the Hawks home matches being divided between the two parent tracks.

== Season summary ==
Extended content

| Year and league | Position | Notes |
|---|---|---|
| 1935 Speedway National League | 5th | As the Hackney Wick Wolves |
| 1936 Speedway National League | 5th | |
| 1937 Speedway National League | 5th | |
| 1938 Speedway National League Division Two | 1st | champions |
| 1939 Speedway National League Division Two | 2nd+ | + when league was suspended |
| 1963 Provincial Speedway League | 10th | As the Hackney Hawks |
| 1964 Provincial Speedway League | 2nd | |
| 1965 British League season | 8th | |
| 1966 British League season | 14th | |
| 1967 British League season | 5th | |
| 1968 British League season | 2nd | |
| 1969 British League season | 19th | |
| 1970 British League season | 11th | |
| 1971 British League season | 7th | Knockout Cup winners |
| 1972 British League season | 8th | |
| 1973 British League season | 16th | |
| 1974 British League season | 9th | |
| 1975 British League season | 17th | |
| 1976 British League season | 7th | |
| 1977 British League season | 16th | |
| 1978 British League season | 19th | |
| 1979 British League season | 18th | |
| 1980 British League season | 2nd | |
| 1981 British League season | 8th | |
| 1982 British League season | 7th | |
| 1983 British League season | 7th | |
| 1984 National League season | 4th | AsHackney Kestrels Knockout Cup winners |
| 1985 National League season | 5th | |
| 1986 National League season | 13th | |
| 1987 British League season | 9th | |
| 1988 National League season | 1st | Champions & Knockout Cup winners |
| 1989 National League season | 6th | |
| 1990 National League season | 5th | Pairs Championship |
| 1996 Premier League speedway season | 9th | As London Lions |
| 2011 National League speedway season | 5th | Raced at Lakeside and Rye House only |

== Notable riders ==
- (Australia) Leigh Adams
- (England) Trevor Banks
- (Australia) Dicky Case
- (England) Andy Galvin
- (England) Dusty Haigh
- (Denmark) Morian Hansen
- (England) Vic Harding
- (England) Frank Hodgson
- (England) Norman Hunter
- (England) Gerry Jackson
- (Sweden) Bengt Jansson
- (England) Mark Loram
- (England) Chris Louis
- (Norway) Dag Lövaas
- (England) Les McGillivray
- (Australia) Garry Middleton
- (United States) Cordy Milne
- (England) Dave Morton
- (Denmark) Bo Petersen
- (Poland) Zenon Plech
- (England) Colin Pratt
- (England) Steve Schofield
- (England) Len Silver
- (England) Malcolm Simmons
- (England) Barry Thomas
- (Denmark) Finn Thomsen
- (England) Roy Trigg
- (England) Simon Wigg
