= Malcolm Brown (speedway rider) =

British speedway rider (born 1935)

- Born: 4 April 1935 (age 91); Walthamstow, London, England
- Nationality: British (English)

Career history
- 1964–1968: Hackney Hawks
- 1969–1974: Leicester Lions

Team honours
- 1972, 1974: Midland Cup

Malcolm Brown (born 4 April 1935) is a former motorcycle speedway rider from England, who rode for Hackney Hawks and Leicester Lions in the 1960s and 1970s.

== Biography ==
Born in Walthamstow, Brown began speedway racing at Rye House, signing for the Hackney Hawks in 1964, and was an ever-present for Hackney in the 1966, 1967, and 1968 seasons. In that era, he also sang regularly in Working Men's Clubs in East London. He moved to the Leicester Lions in 1969, and was a mainstay of the team between 1969 and 1974. He won the Midland Cup on two occasions in 1972 and 1974. He retired from racing after the 1974 season, although he did return to Leicester for a second half event in 1977.

Brown moved to Rhodesia in the mid-1970s, where he promoted speedway at Bulawayo. He also ran his own Z International nightclub, where he performed as a singer and comedian. The end of colonial rule, as Rhodesia became Zimbabwe, saw Brown return to the UK, where he opened the Raffles club in St Austell. In 1988 he relocated again, this time to Florida, where he set up a cleaning company. Through his neighbour, Burt Reynolds, Brown got a small part in the TV series B.L. Stryker, and went on to appear in films such as Illtown and Do You Wanna Know a Secret?. In 2005, he recorded an album, On Track, with proceeds going to help fund the National Speedway Museum.

== Career record ==
All figures relate to the British League.

Year	Team	Matches	Rides	Points	Bonus	Total	Average
1965	Hackney	19	59	60	16	76	5.15
1965	Sheffield	1	4	2	0	2	2.00
1966	Hackney	38	145	147	19	166	4.58
1967	Hackney	39	141	158	20	178	5.05
1968	Hackney	37	134	158	20	178	5.31
1969	Leicester	38	117	127	24	151	5.16
1970	Leicester	38	127	129	22	151	4.76
1971	Leicester	36	118	122	22	144	4.88
1972	Leicester	35	116	96	18	114	3.93
1973	Leicester	36	125	125	21	146	4.67
1974	Leicester	29	87	49	8	57	2.62
