= Cradley Heathens =

Former motorcycle speedway team

Club information
- Track address: Dudley Wood Stadium (1947–1995); Monmore Green Stadium (2010–2015)
- Country: England
- Founded: 1947, 2010
- Closed: 1995, 2019

Club facts
- Colours: Green, white and red

Major team honours
British champions	1981, 1983
Knockout Cup (tier 1)	1979, 1980, 1982, 1983, 1986 (shared), 1987, 1988, 1989
British League Cup (tier 1)	1982, 1984, 1986 (shared)
Pairs championship (tier 1)	1978
Midland Cup (tier 1)	1980, 1983, 1984, 1987
Fours championship (tier1)	1995
Provincial KO Cup (tier 2)	1961, 1963
Inter League KO Cup	1979
Inter League Fours	1980
National League (tier 3)	2013, 2014
National League KO Cup (tier 3)	2013, 2014
National Shield (tier 3)	2011, 2012, 2013, 2014
National League Fours (tier 3)	2011, 2013, 2014
National League Pairs (tier 3)	2013

Cradley Heathens were a motorcycle speedway team from Dudley, England. The team was founded in 1947 and competed primarily at the top level of British speedway at Dudley Wood Stadium until its closure in 1995. The team was revived as Dudley Heathens in 2010, competing in the National League, reverting to the Cradley Heathens name in 2013 but ceased operating after the 2019 season.

== History ==
=== Origins & 1940s ===
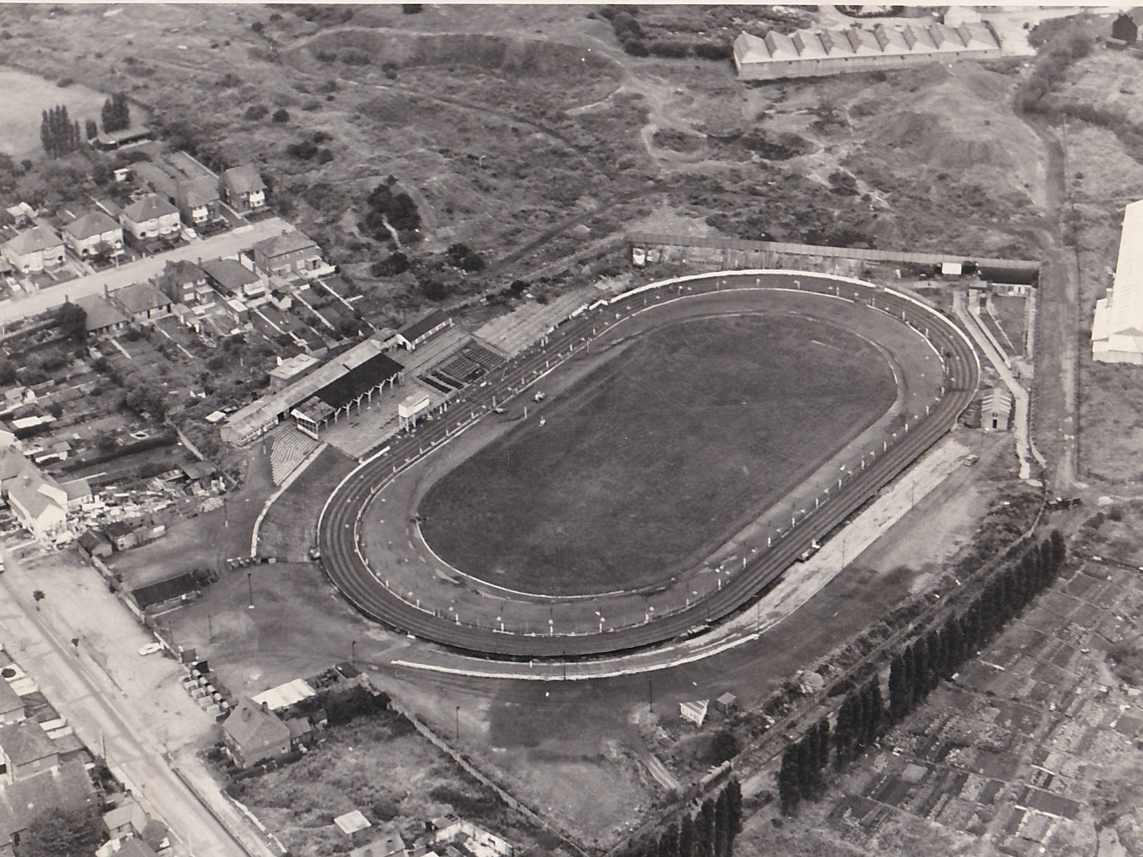
Dudley Wood Stadium circa 1950

In 1917, Cradley Heath St Lukes Football Club found farmland that was suitable for a pitch and constructed a basic football ground and stadium east of the Dudley Wood Road. Due to financial issues, members of the club formed Cradley Sports Enterprise, who constructed speedway and greyhound tracks around the pitch.

The Cradley Heath speedway team was formed for the 1947 season, with the team name taken from Dudley Wood stadium's proximity to Cradley Heath town centre, though it lies in the borough of Dudley, centred about 3 miles (4.8 km) away. At the time of formation the two towns were in different counties - Staffordshire and Worcestershire, but both towns are now part of the county of West Midlands. Riding as the Cradley Heath Cubs they competed in their first match away to Hanley Potters on 8 May 1947. They first raced at Dudley Wood Stadium on 21 June 1947 against Wombwell Colliers. The Cubs would finish runner-up in their inaugural league season to Eastbourne Eagles, only missing out on the title on points difference. The team finished runner-up again in 1948 before a change in the club's nickname and division ensued for 1949. Having gained promotion from the National League Division Three to the National League Division Two, they adopted the name of Cradley Heathens.

=== 1950s ===
The Heathens raced in division 2 from 1950 to 1952 before they were forced to disband following the withdrawal of the promoter Eli Sumner due to financial issues. The track reopened seven years later in 1959 for one unlicensed meeting.

=== 1960s ===
In 1960 the Heathens entered the newly formed Provincial League under the promotion of Morris Jephcott. The club won their first major silverware in 1961, winning the Provincial League Knockout Cup (the second division cup). Watched by 10,000 in the home leg, they defeated Edinburgh Monarchs in the September two-legged final, with Ivor Brown and Harry Bastable scoring heavily.

Ivor Brown topped the league averages in 1962 before the team secured a second Knockout Cup title during the 1963 season, defeating Newcastle Diamonds in the final.

After one more season in division 2, the Heathens were founder members of the new British League (the top division of British speedway). The Heathens struggled for the next few years, managing a best placed finish of 7th in 1969.

=== 1970s ===
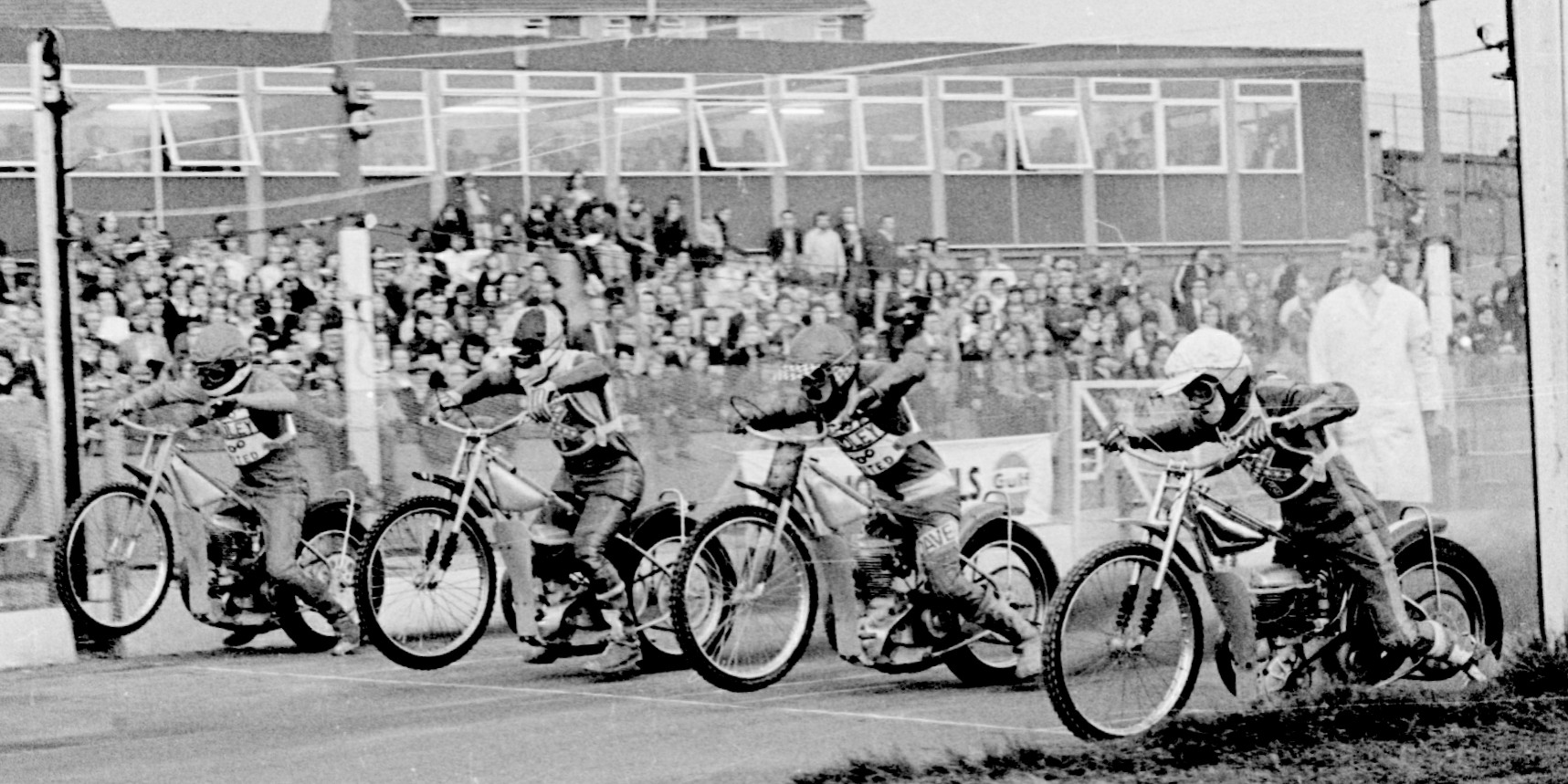
Russ Osborne and Dave Perks race for Cradley in 1975

The Heathens continued to find the British League a challenge, continually finishing in the lower half of the league table despite the performances of Bernt Persson, Bob Andrews and Roy Trigg. From 1973 to 1976 they rode under the name Cradley United but results only marginally improved.

The United name was dropped for the 1977 season and Cradley signed former world champion Anders Michanek. The season resulted in a much improved 7th place finish, which was then followed in 1978 by new signings; Bruce Penhall replacing Michanek at number 1 and Alan Grahame arriving from Birmingham. The Heathens won their first top division silverware in 1978 (jointly with Coventry Bees), winning the British League Pairs Championship held at Foxhall Stadium on 12 October. The meeting was abandoned after 14 heats due to fog but the result stood, with Steve Bastable and Penhall claiming the honours.

The decade ended with further success when the team won the 1979 Knockout Cup, a season which also saw the arrival of the 19-year-old Dane Erik Gundersen.

=== 1980s ===
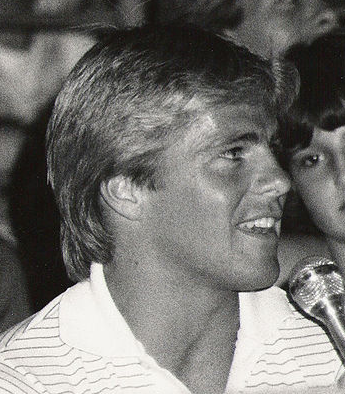
Bruce Penhall

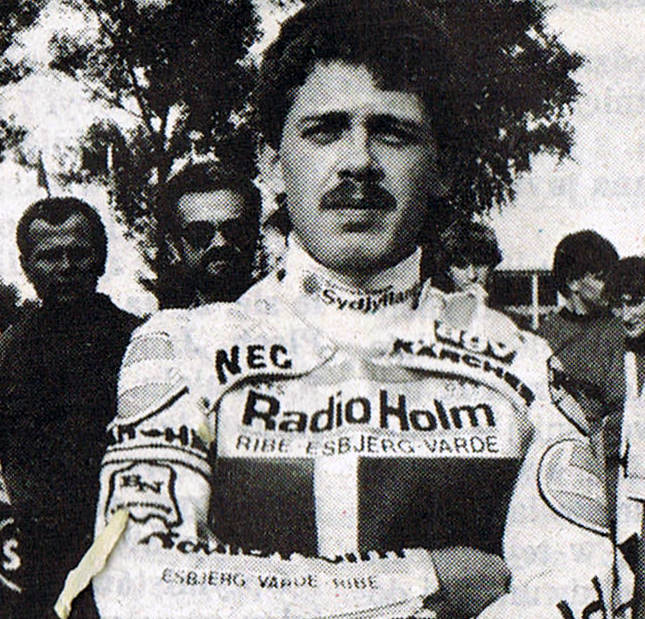
Erik Gundersen

The golden years of Cradley speedway arrived during the 1980s, the club won two league titles (1981 and 1983), a further seven Knockout Cups from 1980 to 1989 and four Midland Cups.

Along with Oxford Cheetahs and Coventry Bees, the three teams dominated British speedway during the decade. Cradley developed a reputation for discovering young talent, which included Americans Penhall, Bobby Schwartz and Lance King, Danes Gundersen and Jan O. Pedersen, along with homegrown talents such as Grahame, Phil Collins, Simon Wigg and Simon Cross. Individual success would also come for these riders, Penhall won back-to-back world titles in 1981 and ’82, Gundersen winning three in 1984, ’85 and ’89, and Pedersen adding his own in 1991. The 1980s promotion teams consisted of Dan McCormick, followed by Peter Adams in 1981 and then he was replaced by former rider Colin Pratt, who joined in 1984.

=== 1990s ===
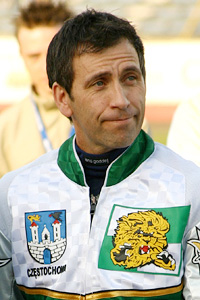
Greg Hancock

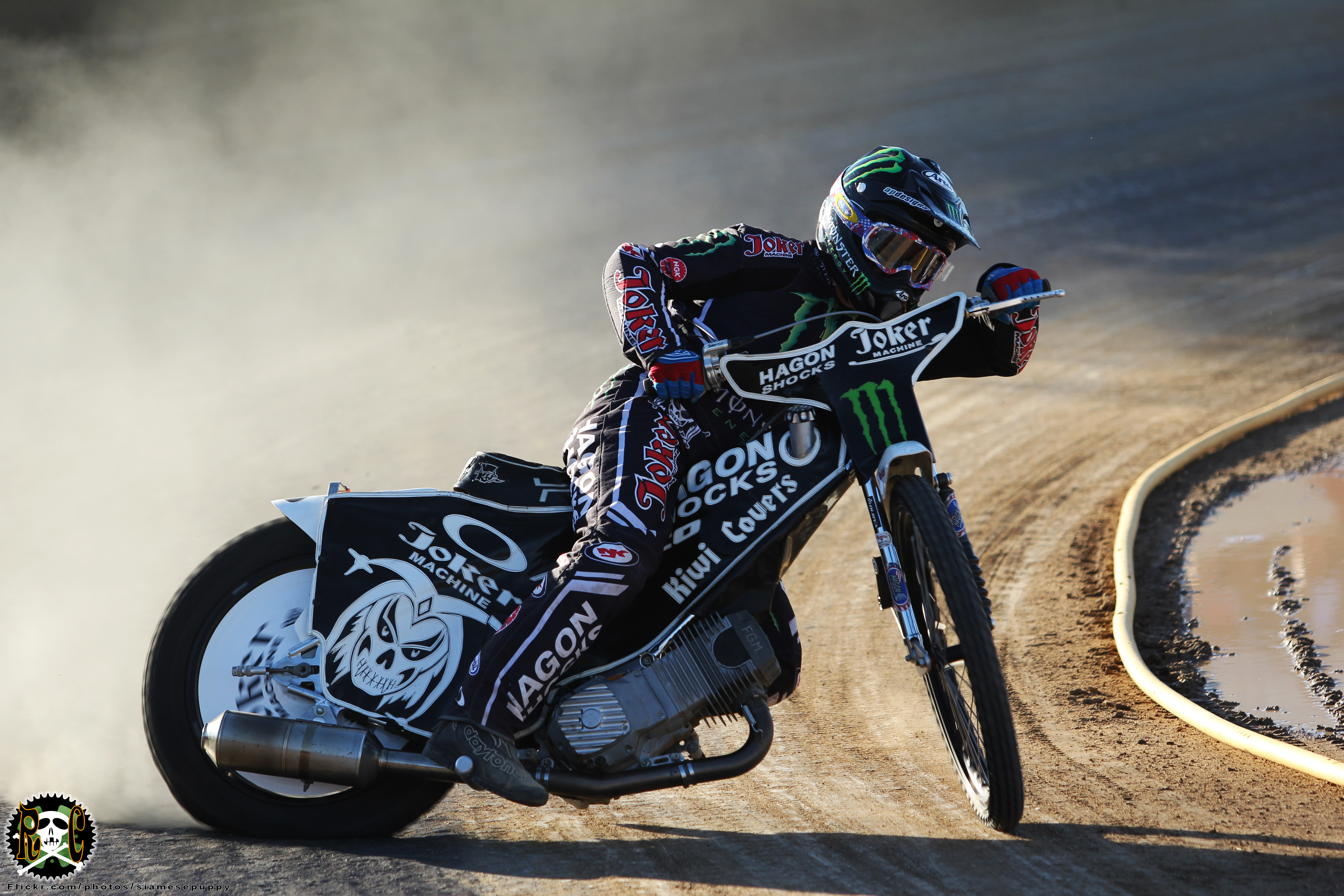
Billy Hamill

The club had operated continuously at top flight level from 1965 but the decade started without Gundersen, who had suffered a horrific accident on 17 September 1989, leaving him partially paralyzed. The club dipped back into the American talent pool and signed future world champions Greg Hancock in 1989 and Billy Hamill in 1990. The club's fortunes however would begin to fade both on and off the track, heat leader Pedersen was also forced to retire prematurely less than a year after winning his world title due to a back injury, and property developers began to mount pressure on the club due to the high value of the stadium’s land. Some success was experienced when in 1995, Hancock, Hamill, Cross and Scott Smith won the Premier League Four-Team Championship, which was held on 6 August 1995, at the East of England Arena.

Unfortunately after the 1995 season, the team were evicted by the new landlords, who had bought the stadium to redevelop into housing. The team survived for one additional year, competing at the Loomer Road Stadium in Stoke in 1996, under the name 'Cradley and Stoke' Heathens, following a merger with the Stoke Potters.

=== 2010s ===
Supporters of the club continued to campaign to resurrect speedway in the local area and plans were submitted to Dudley Council for a new site in 2009. The Birmingham promoter, Tony Mole and Bob Edwards (on behalf of supporters group, CRASH – Cradley Raising Aid Saving Heathens) led the planning application and an online petition to show support for the application which was linked from the Cradley Heath speedway website.

The team returned in 2010 as the Dudley Heathens, competing in the third tier National League, with home meetings initially shared between two stadiums – Monmore Green (home track of Wolverhampton) and the Perry Barr Stadium (home track of Birmingham). The team manager was Will Pottinger, and the club was promoted by Sky Sports speedway presenter Nigel Pearson, and then by Chris Van Straaten & Gary Patchett.

Between 2011 and 2014 home matches were solely at Monmore Green and the team experienced considerable success as a third tier team, winning the league and cup double in both 2013 and 2014, in addition to various other trophies.

The Heathens raced at Perry Barr Stadium in Birmingham for the 2015 season Monmore Green during 2016. Max Clegg won the Riders' Championship during the 2016 National League speedway season.

The team's final season was the 2019 National League speedway season, in which the Heathens finished in fourth place.

=== 2020s ===
A team bearing the Heathens name has operated under the NORA umbrella on the Isle of Wight from 2021 and also at Iwade Speedway in 2024. In 2022 the A.R.H Heathens won the Michael Richardson Trophy and followed this by winning the Vince Mapley Trophy in 2023, in 2025 The Heathens won both The Steve Piper Memorial Trophy and regained The Vince Mapley Trophy. In addition to these successes the Junior Heathens have been successful too under the NORA auspices winning trophies in 2023, 2024 and 2025.

== Season summary ==
Extended content

Year	League	Position	Trophies	Notes
1947	1947 Speedway National League Division Three	Runner-Up		rode as Cubs
1948	1948 Speedway National League Division Three	Runner-Up		rode as Cubs
1949	1949 Speedway National League Division Two	4th	Midland Cup (2 teams)	
1950	1950 Speedway National League Division Two	3rd	Midland Cup (2 teams)	
1951	1951 Speedway National League Division Two	15th	Central Shield	
1952	1952 Speedway National League Division Two	4th		
-	closure -	-	-	-
1960	1960 Provincial Speedway League	6th		
1961	1960 Provincial Speedway League	4th	Provincial League KO Cup	
1962	1962 Provincial Speedway League	8th		
1963	1963 Provincial Speedway League	9th	Provincial League KO Cup, Midland League	
1964	1964 Provincial Speedway League	10th		All 12 tracks unlicensed by ACU
1965	1965 British League season	16th		top tier
1966	1966 British League season	19th	Wooden Spoon	
1967	1967 British League season	18th		
1968	1968 British League season	14th		
1969	1969 British League season	7th		
1970	1970 British League season	15th		
1971	1971 British League season	18th		
1972	1972 British League season	16th		
1973	1973 British League season	18th	rode as United	
1974	1974 British League season	13th	rode as United	
1975	1975 British League season	11th	rode as United	
1976	1976 British League season	9th	rode as United	
1977	1977 British League season	7th		
1978	1978 British League season	5th		
1979	1979 British League season	3rd	Knockout Cup, Inter-League Cup	
1980	1980 British League season	5th	Knockout Cup, Midland Cup	
1981	1981 British League season	Winner		
1982	1982 British League season	Runner-Up	Knockout Cup, League Cup, Premiership	
1983	1983 British League season	Winner	Knockout Cup, Midland Cup	
1984	1984 British League season	3rd	League Cup, Midland Cup, Premiership	
1985	1985 British League season	7th	Premiership	
1986	1986 British League season	Runner-Up	Knockout Cup, League Cup	
1987	1987 British League season	Runner-Up	Knockout Cup, Midland Cup, Brit Trophy	
1988	1988 British League season	3rd	Knockout Cup, Premiership	
1989	1989 British League season	3rd	Knockout Cup, Premiership	
1990	1990 British League season	7th	Premiership	
1991	1991 British League season	3rd		
1992	1992 British League season	4th		
1993	1993 British League season	11th		
1994	1994 British League season	9th		
1995	1995 Premier League speedway season	3rd	Premier League Fours	
1996	1996 Premier League speedway season	5th		Operating from Chesterton, Stoke, rode as Cradley & Stoke Heathens
-	closure -	-	-	-
2010	2010 National League speedway season	3rd		Operating from Perry Barr and Monmore Green
2011	2011 National League speedway season	7th	National Shield, National League Fours	Operating from Monmore Green
2012	2012 National League speedway season	2nd	National Shield	Operating from Monmore Green, finished 1st in regular season table
2013	2013 National League speedway season	1st	National Shield, National League Pairs & Fours, National League Knockout Cup	Operating from Monmore Green
2014	2014 National League speedway season	1st	National League Fours, National League Knockout Cup	Operating from Monmore Green
2015	2015 National League speedway season	3rd		
2016	2016 National League speedway season	4th		
2017	2017 National League speedway season	7th		
2018	2018 National League speedway season	N/a		National trophy only
2019	2019 National League speedway season	4th		

The club also operated a junior team in the British Junior League in the years 1986 to 1992 inclusive, being Runners-Up in 1986 and Winners in 1991.

== Club honours ==
British League
Champions: 1981, 1983

Knockout Cup (Div 1)
Winners: 1979, 1980, 1982, 1983, 1986+, 1987, 1988, 1989 (+shared with Oxford)

Knockout Cup (Div 2)
Winners: 1961, 1963

League Cup
Winners: 1982, 1984, 1986+ (+shared with Oxford)

Inter-League Cup
Winners: 1979

Premiership
A season-opening challenge match, held over two legs, between the previous year's League and KO Cup winners (similar to English football's Charity Shield).

Winners: 1982, 1984, 1985, 1988, 1989, 1990

Inter-League Four Team Tournament
Winners: 1980

Premier League Four Team Tournament
Winners: 1995

Midland Cup/Lge/Shield
Winners: 1950, 1951, 1963, 1980, 1983, 1984, 1987

National League

- National Shield - 2011, 2012 and 2013
- National League Fours Winners - 2011, 2013 and 2014
- National League Pairs Winners - 2013
- National League Champions - 2013 and 2014
- National League Knock Out Cup - 2013 and 2014

== Notable riders ==
- (New Zealand) Bob Andrews
- (England) Harry Bastable
- (England) Steve Bastable
- (England) Geoff Bennett
- (Australia) John Boulger
- (England) Ivor Brown
- (England) Max Clegg
- (England) Gil Craven
- (England) Phil Collins
- (New Zealand) Bruce Cribb
- (England) Simon Cross
- (England) Alan Grahame
- (England) Andy Grahame
- (Denmark) Erik Gundersen
- (Denmark) Gert Handberg
- (England) John Hart
- (England) Alan Hunt
- (United States) Lance King
- (United States) Billy Hamill
- (United States) Greg Hancock
- (Sweden) Anders Michanek
- (Denmark) Jan O. Pedersen
- (United States) Bruce Penhall
- (Sweden) Bernt Persson
- (England) Colin Pratt
- (United States) Bobby Schwartz
- (England) Roy Trigg
- (England) Simon Wigg

== Individual honours ==
Extended content

World Champion

- (United States) Bruce Penhall - 1981, 1982
- (Denmark) Erik Gundersen - 1984, 1985, 1988
- (Denmark) Jan O. Pedersen - 1991
- (United States) Billy Hamill - 1996

Under-21 World Champion

- (Denmark) Gert Handberg - 1989

Long Track World Champion

- (Sweden) Anders Michanek - 1977
- (Denmark) Erik Gundersen - 1984, 1986

British Under-21 Champion

- (England) Phil Collins - 1978
- (United Kingdom) Scott Smith - 1992

Intercontinental Champion

- (United States) Bruce Penhall - 1981
- (Denmark) Erik Gundersen - 1986, 1987
- (Denmark) Jan O. Pedersen - 1988

Overseas Champion

- (England) Phil Collins - 1983
- (United States) Lance King - 1984
- (England) Simon Cross - 1988

British League Riders Champion

- (Denmark) Erik Gundersen - 1983, 1985
- (Denmark) Jan O. Pedersen - 1988

National League Riders Champion

- (United Kingdom) Lee Smart - 2010

American Champion

- (United States) Bruce Penhall - 1980, 1981
- (United States) Greg Hancock - 1995

Danish Champion

- (Denmark) Erik Gundersen - 1983, 1984, 1985, 1986, 1989
- (Denmark) Jan O. Pedersen - 1988
- (Denmark) Gert Handberg - 1992

Swedish Champion

- (Sweden) Bernt Persson - 1977

Scottish Open Champion

- (England) Phil Collins - 1983
- (United States) Greg Hancock - 1991, 1992

Australasian Champion

- (Australia) John Boulger - 1976

South Australian Champion

- (Australia) John Boulger - 1974, 1975, 1976

Western Australian Champion

- (England) Simon Cross - 1987

Victorian Champion (Aust)

- (England) Roy Trigg - 1969, 1970

== See also ==
- Category:Cradley Heathens riders
