= Jon Erskine =

British motorcycle speedway rider

- Born: 9 February 1942 (age 84); Salisbury, England
- Nationality: British (English)

Career history
- 1962: Neath Welsh Dragons
- 1963: Long Eaton Archers
- 1964–1970: Newport Wasps
- 1970–1973: Wolverhampton Wolves

Team honours
- 1964: Provincial League KO Cup
- 1973: Midland Cup

Jonathan G. Erskine (born 9 February 1942) is a former international motorcycle speedway rider from England. He earned one international cap for the England national speedway team and two caps for the Great Britain team.

== Biography ==
Erskine, born in Salisbury began his British leagues career riding for Neath Welsh Dragons during the 1962 Provincial Speedway League, recording a solid 6.73 average. He helped the team finish second in the league standings, but the team would then fold, forcing Erskine to find a new club for 1963, which was the Long Eaton Archers who were returning to league speedway after a 12-year absence.

In 1964, Erskine found his true home, signing for the Newport Wasps, who raced at Somerton Park, in time for the 1964 Provincial Speedway League. He also made his international debut for England in 1964 and would become a fan's favourite. He became the team captain and rode for the club for seven years from 1964 to 1970. He also introduced a training School.

Erskine's career at Newport finished on a sour note during 1970, after he had been sacked but he joined the Wolverhampton Wolves midway through the season.

In 1972, partnering world champion Ole Olsen, the pair won the Midland Best Pairs. During his fourth season for Wolverhampton in 1973, he was involved in a crash and his heart stopped. Doctors managed to revive him but it spelled the end of his career. He did however pick up a winners medal when Wolves went on to win the Midland Cup.

== Family ==
His father Mike Erskine (1914–1985) was a professional speedway rider.
