= Peter Kelly (speedway rider) =

British motorcycle speedway rider

- Born: 7 May 1935; Manchester England
- Died: 2 January 2023 (aged 87); Christchurch, New Zealand
- Nationality: British

Career history
- 1960–1961: Stoke Potters
- 1961–1962: Belle Vue Aces
- 1962: Bradford Panthers
- 1963–1967, 1969–1970: Newcastle Diamonds
- 1969, 1970–1971: Berwick Bandits

Team honours
- 1964: league champion (tier 2)
- 1960: Northern Cup
- 1961: Northern League

Peter Frederick Kelly (7 May 1935 – 2 January 2023) was an international motorcycle speedway rider from England. He earned one international cap for the England national speedway team.

== Biography ==
Kelly, born in Manchester, first appeared in the British leagues in 1959, riding for Yarmouth Bloaters but only began to race regularly for the Stoke Potters during the 1960 Provincial Speedway League season. The following season, he stayed with Stoke but also raced in the top league with Belle Vue Aces.

Kelly raced with Belle Vue and Bradford Panthers in 1962 before sealing a move to Newcastle Diamonds in 1963. At Newcastle, he made significant progress in terms of form from 1963 to 1967 and twice averaged over eight. He helped Newcastle win the 1964 Provincial Speedway League title.

At the beginning of the 1968 season, Kelly announced his retirement from speedway, largely due to a serious crash he was involved in at Hackney.

Kelly reversed his decision in 1969, returning to race for Berwick Bandits for three seasons from 1969 to 1971, under the promotion of Liz and Ken Taylor.

Kelly later emigrated to New Zealand, where he died in 2023.
