= Wayne Briggs =

New Zealand speedway rider

- Born: 24 June 1944 (age 82); Christchurch, New Zealand
- Nationality: New Zealander

Career history
- 1961-1965: Edinburgh Monarchs
- 1966: Poole Pirates
- 1967-1968, 1971: Exeter Falcons
- 1969: Coatbridge Monarchs
- 1970: Wembley Lions

Wayne Briggs (born 24 June 1944 in Christchurch) is a New Zealand former motorcycle speedway rider and a younger brother of Barry Briggs. He earned 5 caps for the New Zealand national speedway team.

== Career ==
Briggs rode in the Provincial League with the Edinburgh Monarchs from 1961–1964 and 1965 in the British League. He then moved south and rode for Poole in 1966 and Exeter between 1967 and 1968. In 1969, he rejoined the Monarchs who were now based in Coatbridge. In 1970, he rode for Wembley and his final season was with Exeter.

In 1962, Briggs tied for first place in the Provincial League Riders' Championship, held at Hyde Road on 22 September, during the 1962 Provincial Speedway League season. In the four rider race off for the title Briggs led until being caught by Len Silver, who won the title from Briggs. He was regarded as a promising prospect for the future but a series of accidents and injuries affected his career.

In 1968 and 1969, Briggs represented the New Zealand national speedway team in test series against the Great Britain national speedway team.
