= Mike Watkin =

British motorcycle speedway rider

- Born: 1 November 1943; Gilsland, Northumberland, England
- Nationality: British (English)

Career history
- 1962–1970, 1975: Newcastle Diamonds
- 1972: Barrow Happy Faces

Team honours
- 1964: League champion (tier 2)

Michael Watkin (born 1 November 1943) is a former international motorcycle speedway rider from England. He earned one international cap for the England national speedway team and one cap for the Great Britain team.

== Biography ==
Watkin, born in Gilsland, Northumberland, was first noticed at the 1961/62 winter training school by his tutor and the Newcastle Diamonds captain Don Wilkinson. Watkin began his British leagues career riding for Newcastle, later that season, during the 1962 Provincial Speedway League campaign. He would spend the majority of his career with the north-east club, riding for them for nine consecutive seasons from 1962 to 1970.

Watkin won the 1964 Provincial Speedway League title and contributed towards the Newcastle team averaging 6.84 that season. In 1971, Newcastle dropped out of the league and most of Newcastle's riders were allocated to Reading Racers but Watkin along with George Hunter and Russ Dent were left without a club for 1971.

In 1972, Watkin joined Barrow Happy Faces as a rider-coach. He left speedway to concentrate on his car sales business, called the Mike Watkin Motor Company at the Parkside Garage on Welbeck Road. However, he returned for one more season with Newcastle, when the new National League was created in 1975. He retired because of a series of operations for a leg injury but was given a benefit meeting by Newcastle in 1978.
