= Norman Storer =

British former motorcycle speedway rider (born 1933)

- Born: 25 June 1933 (age 93); Ridgeway, Derbyshire, England
- Nationality: British (English)

Career history
- 1963-1967: Long Eaton Archers
- 1968-1975: Leicester Lions

Team honours
- 1972, 1974: Midland Cup

Norman Harry Storer (born 5 June 1933) is a former motorcycle speedway rider from England.

== Career ==
Born in Ridgeway, Derbyshire, Storer was experienced in other disciplines of motorcycle racing before speedway, starting with trials in 1950 and later road racing and scrambles. He rode in the 1959 Thruxton 500 mile endurance road race, partnering Chris Vincent on a BSA Road Rocket, finishing in seventh place.

A crash during 1959 resulted in two broken wrists, leaving Storer with a problem with his right hand, after which he took up grasstrack as a result. He began his speedway career in 1963 with Long Eaton Archers, becoming one of the team's top riders by the following year, and staying with them when they joined the British League in 1965.

Storer represented England national speedway team in 1964 against Scotland, and Great Britain in 1965 against an Overseas team, both in Provincial League representative teams. He transferred with the Long Eaton promotion to Leicester Lions in 1968, and stayed with Leicester until his retirement in 1975. His long service was recognised with a testimonial meeting alongside his Leicester captain Ray Wilson in 1974.
