= Vic White =

British speedway rider, promoter and manager (1932–2024)

- Born: 20 May 1932; Hackney, London
- Died: 22 May 2024 (aged 92)
- Nationality: British (English)

Career history
- 1959: Ipswich Witches
- 1960-1961: Cradley Heathens
- 1962: Leicester Hunters
- 1963, 1966-1967: Long Eaton Archers
- 1964-1965: Newport Wasps
- 1965: Belle Vue Aces
- 1968: Leicester Lions
- 1968: Reading Racers

Team honours
- 1961, 1964: Provincial League KO Cup

Victor Harry White (20 May 1932 – 22 May 2024) was an English motorcycle speedway rider, promoter and team manager.

== Biography ==
White was born in Hackney in 1932, and took up speedway in 1956. After gaining experience on training tracks, White made his competitive debut in 1959 for Ipswich in the Southern Area League, and went on to ride for Cradley Heath in 1960 and 1961. He then moved on to Leicester Hunters who he rode for (and captained) until 1963, when he moved to the Long Eaton Archers.

After riding for Newport Wasps in 1964 and 1965, also riding for Belle Vue Aces in 1965, White returned to Long Eaton in 1966. In 1968, he moved with the promotion to the newly formed Leicester Lions, retiring during the season but soon returning, finishing the season with Reading Racers. He was the only rider to ride for both the Hunters and the Lions.

Retiring from racing for good at the end of the 1968 season, White worked in promotion and team management, working with Long Eaton, Scunthorpe Scorpions, Leicester, Cradley Heath, and Coventry Bees.

White's son Keith followed him into a career in speedway, riding under Vic's management at Leicester in the 1970s.

White served as President of the World Speedway Riders' Association in 1998, later serving as secretary and treasurer. He died on 22 May 2024, two days after his 92nd birthday.
