= Trevor Redmond =

New Zealand speedway rider

- Born: 16 June 1927; Christchurch, New Zealand
- Died: 17 September 1997 (aged 70); Glastonbury, England
- Nationality: New Zealander

Career history
- 1950-1951: Aldershot Shots
- 1951-1956: Wembley Lions
- 1957: Bradford Tudors
- 1959: Swindon Robins
- 1960: Bristol Bulldogs
- 1961: Wolverhampton Wolves
- 1962: Neath Welsh Dragons
- 1963: St Austell Gulls
- 1964: Glasgow Tigers

Individual honours
- 1960: Provincial League Riders' Champion
- 1961: Scottish Open Champion

Team honours
- 1952, 1953: National League Champions
- 1954: National Trophy Winner
- 1954: London Cup Winner
- 1960: Provincial League KO Cup Winner

Trevor John Redmond (16 June 1927 – 17 September 1997) was a motorcycle speedway rider from New Zealand. He earned 17 caps for the New Zealand national speedway team and 11 caps for the South African national team. Redmond also opened a speedway track in Neath, Wales in 1962, and later became a promoter of stock car and hot rod racing, mainly in southwest England, through his Autospeed organisation.

== Career ==
=== Rider ===
Redmond started riding speedway in 1949 at the Aranui track in Christchurch. He moved to the UK when he won a team place with the newly formed Aldershot Shots in 1950. He was successful enough to attract the Wembley Lions to sign him in 1951, following an unsuccessful attempt by Walthamstoe to sign him. He remained at Wembley until their closure in 1956. Whilst with the Lions, Redmond qualified for two World Championship finals.

A season in non-league speedway followed in 1957, but in 1958, Redmond did not ride at all, instead he opened a track in Cornwall at St Austell. He returned to racing for a spell with the Swindon Robins and moved onto the Bristol Bulldogs in 1960. As a Bristol rider, Redmond won the Provincial League Riders' Championship, held at Dudley Wood Stadium on 24 September 1960.

The Bristol track closed at the end of that season, and in 1961, Redmond had a brief spell with the Wolverhampton Wolves. In subsequent years, he was rider and promoter of league teams at Neath,(1962,) St. Austell,(1963) and Glasgow,(1964-65.) He was one of only two riders to appear in all five Provincial League Riders Championship Finals, being winner in 1960, and a disappointed Runner-Up in 1961 after a broken chain in his final ride cost him the title.

=== Promoter ===
In 1958, Redmond promoted at St Austell, on an open licence, and in 1961, he also promoted open meetings in Dublin (Shelbourne). In 1962, he opened a track in Neath, Wales. The team was named the Neath Welsh Dragons and operated in the Speedway Provincial League. The team finished in second place, which was considered a remarkable achievement by the speedway press. Neath folded at the start of the 1963 season, so Redmond took the St Austell Gulls into the Provincial League. In 1964 he continued to both ride and promote, but this time with the Glasgow Tigers, which he reopened and operated from the White City Stadium. He stopped finally riding in 1964, but continued to promote the club until the start of the 1967 season. In 1970, Redmond was influential in the reopening of speedway at Wembley Stadium, with the return of the Wembley Lions. He was later a member of the FIM and was involved in the administration of international speedway, and he managed New Zealand speedway teams. He promoted motor racing at several tracks in southern England, including St Austell, Newton Abbot, St Day, Weymouth, Reading, and two events at Wembley Stadium. He died at his home in Glastonbury in 1997.

== World final appearances ==
- 1952 - (England) London, Wembley Stadium - Res - Did not ride
- 1954 - (England) London, Wembley Stadium - 13th - 5pts

Redmond set up the business Autospeed and opened tracks in Newton Abbot and St Austell where they raced Bangers, Hot Rods and stock cars. Autospeed were the first to run Auto Rods which were to become the Saloon Stock Cars. They were also the first to run SuperRods which started as Jags and Fords as big engined Hotrods.
