= Neath Welsh Dragons =

Welsh motorcycle speedway team

Club information
- Track address: Neath Abbey Stadium; Monastery Road; Neath Abbey; Neath
- Country: Wales
- Founded: 1962
- Closed: 1962
- League: Provincial League

Club facts
- Track size: 375 yards (343 m)

The Neath Welsh Dragons were a short-lived speedway team who operated from Neath Abbey Stadium, in Neath, Wales, in 1962.

== History ==
The speedway circuit was opened by former speedway rider Trevor Redmond, who had hoped that he could attract some of the best Welsh riders at the time.

The Dragons were members of the Provincial League for one season and finished runners-up in the 1962 Provincial Speedway League. The feat of finishing second was described as achieving the impossible.

The description 'stadium' is misleading because the venue was literally an oval with a cinder track with banking for spectators. The west side of the Neath Abbey was so close to the banking that the Abbey ruins looked as though they formed part of the stadium. Monastery Road at the time was situated slightly different to where it is today (it now bends to the West instead of the East). The stadium was opened to Stock car racing as early as 1954.

Attendances were poor and several home meetings were staged at St Austell Gulls' Cornish Stadium due to lack of floodlighting.

== Season summary ==
Year and league	Position	Notes
1962 Provincial Speedway League	2nd	
