= Norman Strachan =

British motorcycle speedway rider

- Born: 18 September 1934 (age 92); Poole, Dorset, England
- Died: 17th June 2026; Poole, Dorset, England
- Nationality: British (English)

Career history
- 1953–1956, 1958–1967, 1973: Poole Pirates
- 1968–1970: Newport Wasps
- 1971–1972: Oxford Cheetahs/Rebels
- 1973–1974: Coatbridge Tigers
- 1973: Long Eaton Rangers

Team honours
- 1955, 1961, 1962: League champion (tier 2)
- 1955: Knockout Cup (tier 2)
- 1962, 1963, 1964: Provincial Southern League Champion

Norman Edward Strachan (born 18 September 1934) is a former motorcycle speedway rider from England.

== Biography ==
Strachan, born in Poole, was a cycle speedway rider before he learned how to ride speedway at the Matcham's Park training facilities. He began his British leagues career riding for Poole Pirates during the 1953 Speedway National League Division Two season.

Strachan built up his reputation at Poole and would become a fan's favourite at the club and helped the Pirates win the double of league and Knockout Cup in 1955 but suffered a serious hand injury working in a local sawmill in 1956.

The injury affected Strachan's speedway career for the next few seasons and it was not until 1960 that he returned to regular action. In 1962, he was described as an enigma because of his contrasting form and contributed towards Poole's two consecutive Provincial League titles in 1961 and 1962.

Strachan made 303 appearances for Poole from 1953 to 1967 and was inducted into the Hall of fame in 1994. In 1968, he left Poole when he was allocated to the Newport Wasps and rode for them for three seasons before moving on to Oxford Cheetahs in 1971.

Strachan retired after the 1974 season, by which time he had also ridden for Coatbridge Tigers and Long Eaton Rangers.
