= Russ Dent =

British motorcycle speedway rider

- Born: July 22, 1940 (age 86); Consett, England
- Died: March 8, 2025 (aged 84–85)
- Nationality: British (English)

Career history
- 1961–1967, 1970: Newcastle Diamonds
- 1967–1969: Glasgow Tigers
- 1971: Halifax Dukes
- 1971–1974: Sunderland Stars
- 1972: Wolverhampton Wolves

Team honours
- 1964: Provincial League Champion

Allan Russell Dent (born 22 July 1940) was a former international motorcycle speedway rider from England. He earned one international cap for the England national speedway team.

== Biography ==
Dent began his British leagues career riding for Newcastle Diamonds during the newly formed 1965 British League season. Halfway through the 1967 season he moved north of the border to join the Scottish club Glasgow Tigers on loan. He returned to Newcastle for the start of the 1970 Season. In 1971, Newcastle dropped out of the league and most of Newcastle's riders were allocated to Reading Racers but Dent along with George Hunter and Mike Watkin were left without a club.

Dent dropped down to the British League Division Two in 1971, after joining the Sunderland Stars and made an immediate impact, topping the team's averages for the season. He spent fours years at Sunderland becoming their team captain and earning the nickname 'The Skipper'. He scored 931 points with 61 bonus points, broke the Hull track record and won 1971 Teesside Farewell Trophy and the 1973 Northern Star Championship. He represented England against Scotland in 1974.
