= Charlie Monk (speedway rider) =

Australian speedway rider

- Born: 5 February 1940 (age 86); Adelaide, Australia
- Nationality: Australian

Career history
- 1962: Neath Welsh Dragons
- 1963: Long Eaton Archers
- 1964-1967, 1969-1972: Glasgow Tigers
- 1968: Sheffield Tigers
- 1973-1976: Halifax Dukes
- 1977: Edinburgh Monarchs
- 1978: Barrow Furness Flyers

Individual honours
- 1965: Internationale
- 1971: South Australian Champion

Team honours
- 1965: Speedway World Team Cup bronze medal

Warren Edric Monk (born 5 February 1940) is an Australian former international motorcycle speedway rider. He earned 26 international caps for the Australia national speedway team and 15 caps for the Great Britain national speedway team.

== Speedway career ==
Monk won a bronze medal at the Speedway World Team Cup in the 1965 Speedway World Team Cup when he represented Great Britain (during the time period when Oceania riders were allowed to represent Britain). Also in 1965, he won the prestigious Wimbledon Internationale.

After a season with the Neath Welsh Dragons in 1962, Monk signed for Long Eaton Archers but rode primarily for Glasgow Tigers in the top tier of British Speedway riding. From 1973 to 1976, he rode for Halifax Dukes.

In 1977, Monk signed for Edinburgh.

Monk was a four-time British/Commonwealth finalist and also represented Scotland in test matches.

== World final appearances ==
=== World Team Cup ===
- 1965 - (West Germany) Kempten* (with Barry Briggs / Nigel Boocock / Ken McKinlay / Jimmy Gooch) - 3rd - 18pts (1)

*Note: Monk rode for Great Britain in the World Team Cup
