= John Dews =

British motorcycle racer (1945–1995)

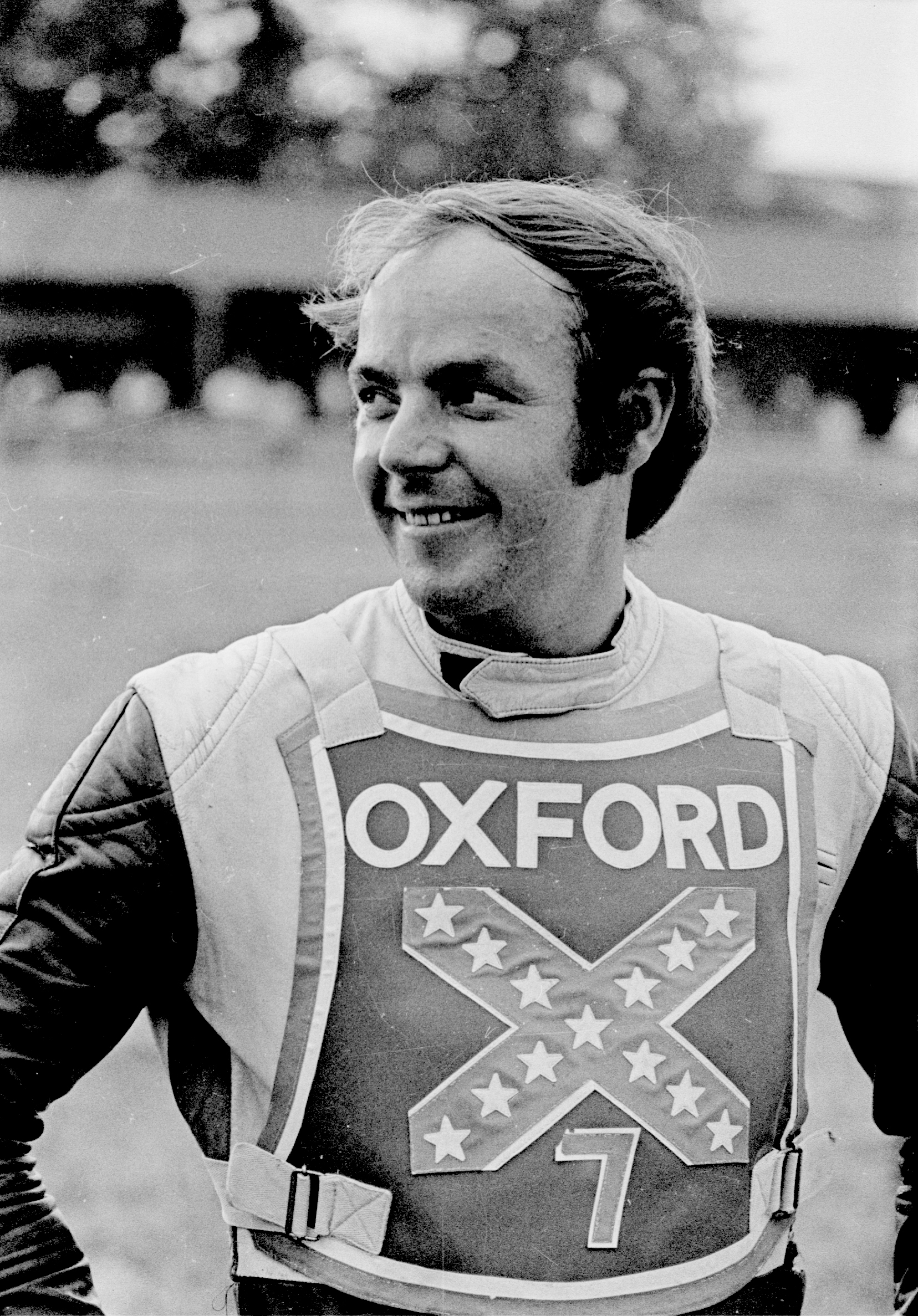
- Born: 26 March 1945; Wakefield, England
- Died: 7 August 1995 (aged 50)
- Nationality: British (English)

Career history
- 1962-1963: Belle Vue Aces
- 1962-1970: Sheffield Tigers
- 1971-1972: Wimbledon Dons
- 1973-1975: Oxford Rebels
- 1976: White City Rebels

Team honours
- 1962, 1963, 1964: Provincial Northern League Champion
- 1975: Midland Cup winner

John Dews (26 March 1945 – 7 August 1995) was a motorcycle speedway rider from England.

== Career ==
Born in Wakefield, West Yorkshire, England, Dews started his speedway career as a trainee at Belle Vue Aces, had his longest team history with Sheffield Tigers, scoring over 1,300 points for the club. Speedway rules required a change of team due to his averages and he moved to Wimbledon Dons for two years, before Oxford in 1973, as a replacement for Dave Hemus, He won the Radio Oxford Best Pairs match at Oxford in May 1974, partnering Richard Greer.

Dews was a member of the Midland Cup winning team in 1975, after drawn matches with Swindon Robins in the first round requiring reruns. He then moved with the Rebels under promoters Danny Dunton and Bob Dugard to White City Stadium in 1976, where he ended his racing career as a popular rider.

Dews rode 270 matches in his career, having 1033 rides, with a match average of 6.29. He went back to Sheffield to be the team manager in 1977 until 1980.

Dews died in August 1995, aged only 50, after a short illness.

== Gallery ==
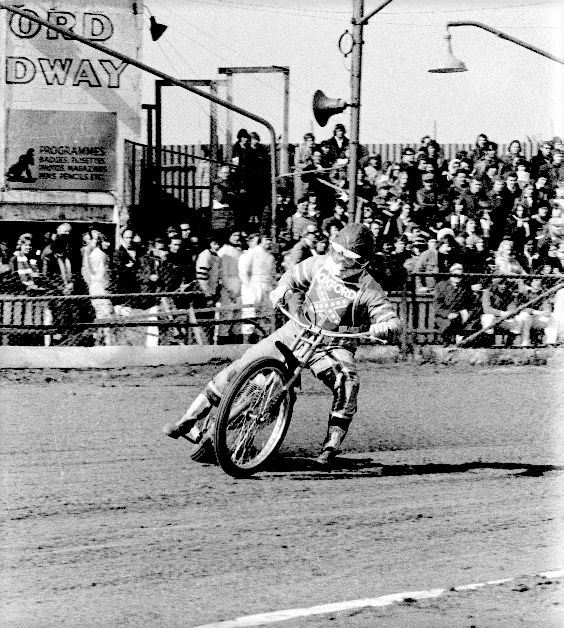
Dews in action at Oxford

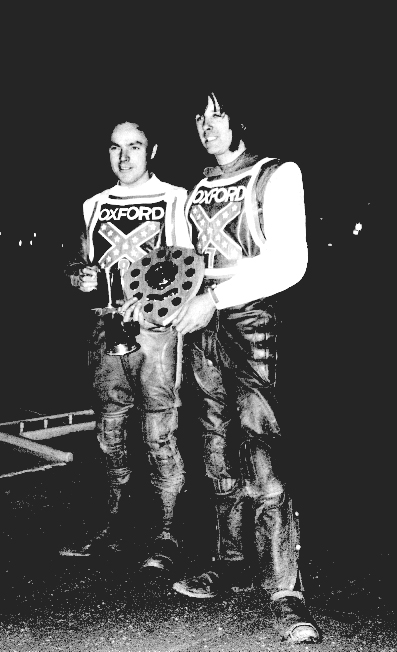
Oxford Best Pairs Champions
