= Provincial League (speedway) =

British speedway league

- Sport: Speedway
- Founded: 1960; 66 years ago
- Folded: 1964; 62 years ago
- Competitors: Varied
- Country: United Kingdom

The Provincial League was a league competition for speedway teams in the United Kingdom. The Provincial League created as a breakaway league from the National League and continued for five seasons between 1960 and 1964.

== History ==
The 'Provincial League' name had previously been used for the second tier of the National League in the 1930s, although the name was dropped after two seasons, when it was renamed to National League Division Two.

The new Provincial League was formed in the winter of 1959/60, when a group of promoters dissatisfied with the declining National League decided to form a breakaway league. Manchester businessman and sometime midget car driver Mike Parker had run a number of pirate meetings at Liverpool and Bradford and was involved with one at Cradley Heath in the summer of 1959. Interest was aroused by many people and a meeting was called in Manchester for like-minded people. A number of promoters and former riders including Reg Fearman and Ian Hoskins met to discuss re-introducing speedway to lapsed venues and form a strong League and Promoters Association. The Provincial League was formed under the rules of the Speedway Control Board (SCB) and Auto Cycle Union (ACU).

The league re-introduced speedway to many lost venues (particularly outside of London) and was a mostly a success, with crowds often outstripping the National League, with its established star names like Peter Craven of Belle Vue, and Swedish star Ove Fundin of Norwich.

In 1964 the Provincial League operated outside of Speedway Control Board authority following a major dispute over how Speedway should be run. The controversy was brought about by the refusal of Wolverhampton to move up to the National League, which only had six teams at the time, after winning the Provincial League title in 1963. This caused a split between the leagues, and the Provincial League was outlawed by the Speedway Control Board and all National League riders were forbidden to ride on Provincial tracks. Provincial League riders were warned by the Speedway Control board that they were in breach of ACU regulations and could be suspended from all competitive racing. They were also barred from the World Speedway Championship. The Provincial League objected and went black the 1964 season, racing under their own rules and arbitrator, and appointing their own officials and referees.

An enquiry was held that year set up by the Royal Automobile Club (RAC) and chaired by Lord Shawcross who decided that the SCB was acting illegally. He recommended that the SCB be re-formed with a new Secretary/Manager and a new Chairman appointed from the RAC. During the winter of 1964/65, meetings were held between the promoters of the two leagues and the SCB led to a reconciliation between the two bodies and the merger of the two leagues leading to the establishment of a single 18 team British League for the 1965 season. This reorganisation also led to the formation of the British Speedway Promoters Association.

== Champions ==
Season	Champions	Second	Third
1960	Rayleigh Rockets	Poole Pirates	Bristol Bulldogs
1961	Poole Pirates	Plymouth Devils	Stoke Potters
1962	Poole Pirates	Neath Welsh Dragons	Exeter Falcons
1963	Wolverhampton Wolves	Stoke Potters	Poole Pirates
1964	Newcastle Diamonds	Hackney Hawks	Wolverhampton Wolves

== See also ==
List of United Kingdom Speedway League Champions
