= 1975 New National League season =

British motorcycle speedway season

- League: New National League
- No. of competitors: 20
- Champions: Birmingham Brummies
- Knockout Cup: Eastbourne Eagles
- Individual: Laurie Etheridge
- Pairs: Newcastle Diamonds
- Highest average: Joe Owen
- Division/s above: 1975 British League

The 1975 New National League was contested as the second division/tier of Speedway in the United Kingdom when British League Division Two was renamed. It was subsequently named the National League. The change came about following unrest between some of the clubs and the speedway authorities in previous seasons.

== Summary ==
The league increased by one team for the fourth season in a row, despite the loss of three teams; the Barrow Bombers, Long Eaton Archers and Sunderland Gladiators. Sunderland closed for good but in November 1974, Ian Thomas bought the defunct Sunderland licence and transferred it to re-form the Newcastle Diamonds. Three other new teams entered, in addition to the Newcastle Diamonds and they were Crayford Kestrels (returning for their first season since 1970), while Mildenhall Fen Tigers and Paisley Lions both competed in their inaugural seasons. Paisley would race at a new track constructed around Love Street, home of St Mirren F.C..

Birmingham Brummies, winners of the last British League Division Two, retained their title and were promoted to the British League for 1976. Birmingham won the league by 5 points despite losing their leading rider Phil Herne to Newport in division 1. Birmingham relied heavily on Arthur Browning, Alan Grahame and Keith White, improved performances by Ricky Day and Carl Askew and solid seasons once again from John Hart and George Major.

Newcastle finished runner-up on their return to league action, with the Owen brothers Joe Owen and Tom Owen topping the league averages.

== Final table ==
Pos	Team	PL	W	D	L	Pts
1	Birmingham Brummies	38	29	1	8	59
2	Newcastle Diamonds	38	27	0	11	54
3	Stoke Potters	38	26	0	12	52
4	Eastbourne Eagles	38	25	0	13	50
5	Boston Barracudas	38	24	2	12	50
6	Workington Comets	38	23	2	13	48
7	Berwick Bandits	38	21	3	14	45
8	Crayford Kestrels	38	20	2	16	42
9	Ellesmere Port Gunners	38	19	1	18	39
10	Canterbury Crusaders	38	19	0	19	38
11	Bradford Barons	38	17	2	19	36
12	Coatbridge Tigers	38	17	1	20	35
13	Scunthorpe Saints	38	17	0	21	34
14	Rye House Rockets	38	13	2	23	28
15	Paisley Lions	38	14	0	24	28
16	Crewe Kings	37	13	1	23	27
17	Teesside Tigers	38	13	0	25	26
18	Peterborough Panthers	37	13	0	24	26
19	Mildenhall Fen Tigers	38	11	1	26	23
20	Weymouth Wizards	38	8	2	28	18

== Fixtures and results ==
Home \ Away	BER	BIR	BOS	BRA	CAN	COA	CRY	CK	EAS	EP	MIL	NEW	PAI	PET	RH	SCU	STO	TEE	WEY	WOR
Berwick		42–35	41–37	47–31	50–27	39–39	56–22	43–35	47–31	48–30	52–26	43–35	52–26	53–25	47–31	47–30	50–27	48–29	41–36	44–34
Birmingham	54–24		41–36	55–22	45–33	52–25	49–29	55–23	45–33	51–27	57–20	46–32	53–25	59–19	52–26	56–22	44–34	49–29	53–25	47–31
Boston	48–30	45–33		47–31	47–31	52–26	54–24	49–29	48–30	60–18	50–28	42–36	56–22	54–24	39–38	64–14	34–44	45–33	61–17	37–41
Bradford	51–27	36–42	39–39		43–35	48–30	49–29	48–30	42–36	47–29	51–27	45–33	40–38	47–31	54–24	53–25	45–33	43–35	63–15	39–39
Canterbury	61–17	49–28	45–32	55–23		52–26	49–29	42–36	40–37	43–35	53–23	38–40	59–19	60–18	44–34	55–23	43–35	49–29	43–35	37–41
Coatbridge	50–28	34–43	37–41	50–27	45–32		53–25	41–37	38–40	46–31	58–20	43–35	54–24	43–35	43–34	49–29	38–40	45–32	51–27	43–35
Crayford	58–20	43–35	46–30	59–19	47–31	45–31		48–30	38–40	57–20	50–28	37–41	55–23	53–25	46–32	43–35	50–28	48–30	50–27	57–21
Crewe	50–28	32–46	39–39	54–24	50–28	51–26	37–41		31–46	47–31	47–31	38–39	42–36	46–32	58–20	36–40	37–41	41–37	59–19	42–36
Eastbourne	50–28	45–33	52–26	63–15	48–30	55–23	55–23	55–23		53–24	61–17	37–40	60–18	59–19	52–26	57–21	52–26	53–25	43–34	46–32
Ellesmere Port	45–33	39–39	46–32	51–27	46–32	46–32	55–23	44–33	48–30		54–24	41–37	40–38	45–32	51–27	45–33	34–44	44–34	51–27	43–35
Mildenhall	46–32	26–52	31–47	49–29	44–34	40–38	39–38	36–41	37–41	41–37		41–37	57–20	37–41	39–39	37–41	21.5–55.5	51–27	46–32	40–37
Newcastle	54–24	38–40	47–31	62–16	49–29	49–29	46–32	50–28	44–34	40–38	49–29		46–32	52–26	52–26	47–29	44–34	50–28	54–24	42–36
Paisley	33–45	45–32	47–31	35–43	43–35	38–40	44–33	46–32	45–32	47–31	41–37	46–30		48–30	48–29	47–31	36–41	41–37	42–36	37–41
Peterborough	35–43	38–40	31–46	43–34	30–48	40–38	45–33	nh	44–34	41–37	42–36	37–41	47–29		47–31	40–38	40–38	47–31	50–28	38–40
Rye House	46–32	33–45	38–39	49–29	39–38	46–32	39–39	53–25	31–45	47–30	47–30	36–42	49–28	47–31		44–34	32–46	48–29	44–33	45–32
Scunthorpe	48–30	32–46	34–44	41–37	41–37	52–26	38–40	41–37	40–38	46–32	47–31	38–40	41–37	42–36	43–34		44–34	51–27	45–33	37–41
Stoke	42–36	48–30	44–34	49–29	53–25	48–30	36–42	54–24	54–24	53–25	51–27	41–37	58–20	56–21	44–34	58–20		49–29	46–32	52–26
Teesside	37–41	33–44	37–40	49–29	52–26	50–28	42–35	52–26	38–40	37–41	45–33	35–43	47–30	48–30	48–30	49–29	42–36		58–20	42–36
Weymouth	39–39	38–39	28–50	50–28	35–42	34–43	39–39	43–35	33–45	37–41	50–28	34–44	53–25	48–30	43–35	41–37	37–41	44–34		30–48
Workington	39–39	41–36	53–25	47–30	55–23	46–32	49–29	44–34	40–38	48–30	58–20	40–38	64–14	43–35	54–24	36.5–41.5	41–37	43–35	40–38	

Legend: Blue = home team win; Yellow = draw; Red = away team win.

== Top five riders (league averages) ==
	Rider	Nat	Team	C.M.A.
1	Joe Owen	(England)	Newcastle	10.89
2	Tom Owen	(England)	Newcastle	10.78
3	Alan Molyneux	(England)	Stoke	10.10
4	Paul Gachet	(England)	Eastbourne	10.08
5	Les Rumsey	(England)	Canterbury	10.01

== National League Knockout Cup ==
The 1975 National League Knockout Cup was the eighth edition (first under its new name) of the Knockout Cup for tier two teams. Eastbourne Eagles were the winners of the competition.

First round

Date	Team one	Score	Team two
15/04	Ellesmere Port	43-35	Coatbridge
11/04	Coatbridge	50-28	Ellesmere Port
14/04	Newcastle	44-34	Berwick
05/04	Berwick	40-38	Newcastle
21/03	Peterborough	42-36	Boston
16/03	Boston	40-38	Peterborough
14/04	Birmingham	51-27	Crayford
15/04	Crayford	37-40	Birmingham

Second round

Date	Team one	Score	Team two
05/05	Scunthorpe	38-40	Teesside
01/05	Teesside	45-32	Scunthorpe
30/05	Coatbridge	39-39	Newcastle
19/05	Newcastle	50-27	Coatbridge
10/05	Paisley	43-34	Workington
30/05	Workington	45-33	Paisley
05/05	Crewe	38-40	Bradford
14/05	Bradford	48-30	Crewe
09/05	Peterborough	49-29	Weymouth
29/04	Weymouth	50-28	Peterborough
11/05	Rye House	31-46	Birmingham
05/05	Birmingham	60-18	Rye House
10/05	Canterbury	40-37	Eastbourne
11/05	Eastbourne	49-29	Canterbury

Quarter-finals

Date	Team one	Score	Team two
07/08	Teesside	32-46	Newcastle
28/07	Newcastle	54-24	Teesside
24/08	Workington	47-31	Stoke
21/08	Stoke	42-36	Workington
23/09	Weymouth	42-36	Eastbourne
09/07	Bradford	47-31	Weymouth
14/07	Birmingham	41-37	Eastbourne
06/07	Eastbourne	45-33	Birmingham

Semi-finals

Date	Team one	Score	Team two
19/09	Workington	48-30	Newcastle
15/09	Newcastle	48-30	Workington
23/09	Weymouth	42-36	Eastbourne
21/09	Eastbourne	60-18	Weymouth
29/09 replay	Newcastle	37-41	Workington
26/09 replay	Workington	51-27	Newcastle

=== Final ===
First leg

17 October 1975

Workington Comets Mike Newton 11 Taffy Owen 11 Lou Sansom 10 Roger Wright 8 Robbie Gardner 5 Terry Kelly 1 Steve Lawson 1	47 – 31	Eastbourne Eagles Neil Middleditch 12 Paul Gachet 7 Mike Sampson 5 Eric Dugard 3 Pete Jarman 2 Colin Richardson 2 Mike Pither 0

Derwent Park

Second leg

19 October 1975

Eastbourne Eagles Neil Middleditch 10 Mike Sampson 10 Pete Jarman 10 Paul Gachet 8 Eric Dugard 7 Mike Pither 4 Colin Richardson 3	52 – 25	Workington Comets Lou Sansom 13 Robbie Gardner 6 Taffy Owen 4 Terry Kelly 1 Steve Lawson 1 Mick Newton 0 Roger Wright 0

Arlington Stadium

Eastbourne were declared Knockout Cup Champions, winning on aggregate 83–72.

== Riders' Championship ==
Laurie Etheridge won the Riders' Championship, held at Wimbledon Stadium on 27 September.

Pos.	Rider	Pts	Total
1	(England) Laurie Etheridge	3 2 2 3 3	13+3
2	(Scotland) Brian Collins	3 3 3 3 1	13+2
3	(England) Arthur Browning	2 2 3 1 2	10+3
4	(England) Les Rumsey	2 3 0 2 3	10+2
5	(England) Michael Lee	1 1 3 2 3	10+1
6	(England) John Jackson	3 1 3 1 1	9
7	(England) Tom Leadbitter	0 2 2 1 3	8
8	(England) Joe Owen	2 0 1 3 2	8
9	(England) Paul Gachet	3 3 fex 2 0	8
10	(England) Bob Coles	2 2 2 0 1	7
11	(England) Brian Clark	0 1 2 3 f	6
12	(England) Alan Molyneux	1 1 1 0 2	5
13	(England) Brian Foote	0 f 1 2 2	5
14	(England) Colin Meredith	1 0 1 1	4
15	(Australia) Lou Sansom	0 3 0 0 0	3
16	(England) Tony Childs	1 0 0 0 0	

- f=fell, r-retired, ex=excluded, ef=engine failure

== Pairs ==
The National League Pairs was held at Hyde Road on 17 May and was won by Newcastle Diamonds.

Group A
Pos	Team	Pts	Riders
1	Eastbourne	14	Gachet 9 Middleditch 5
2	Scunthorpe	10	McKinlay 6 Childs 4
3	Workington	8	Sansom 7 Gardner 1
4	Paisley	4	Sheldrick 4 Roynon 0

Group B
Pos	Team	Pts	Riders
1	Crayford	14	Sage 8 Etheridge 6
2	Birmingham	10	Hart 8 Browning 2
3	Bradford	9	Featherstone 6 Baugh 3
4	Rye House	3	Foote 3 Clarke 0

Group C
Pos	Team	Pts	Riders
1	Ellesmere P	12	Jackson 9 Goad 3
2	Peterborough	11	Clark 6 Matthews 5
3	Coatbridge	7	Collins 6 Gallacher 1
4	Stoke	6	Molyneux 4 Millen 2

Group D
Pos	Team	Pts	Riders
1	Newcastle	13	Havelock 8 Owen T 5
2	Crewe	10	Drury 8 Wasley 2
3	Teesside	9	Reading 5 Durham 4
4	Berwick	4	Gifford 4 Templeton W 0

Semi finals

- Ellesmere Port bt Eastbourne
- Newcastle bt Crayford

Final

- Newcastle bt Eastbourne

== Leading final averages ==
	Rider	Nat	Team	C.M.A.
1	Joe Owen	(England)	Newcastle	10.65
2	Tom Owen	(England)	Newcastle	10.65
3	Alan Molyneux	(England)	Stoke	10.14
4	Les Rumsey	(England)	Canterbury	9.90
5	Paul Gachet	(England)	Eastbourne	9.87

== Riders & final averages ==
Berwick

- Dave Gifford 8.58
- Graham Jones 7.65
- Colin Farquharson 7.41
- Steve Finch 6.75
- Willie Templeton 6.34
- Denny Morter 4.89
- Dave Trownson 4.86
- Bernie Hornby 4.85

Birmingham

- Arthur Browning 9.35
- Alan Grahame 8.38
- Keith White 8.22
- John Hart 8.00
- Keith Anderson 7.58
- Ricky Day 7.34
- George Major 7.31
- Carl Askew 6.91

Boston

- Michael Lee 9.04
- Bruce Forrester 8.22
- David Gagen 7.83
- Rob Hollingworth 7.30
- Billy Burton 7.19
- Les Glover 6.95
- Dave Piddock 6.17
- Rob Mouncer 6.13
- Trevor Whiting 4.53

Bradford

- Tony Featherstone 8.34
- Colin Meredith 7.92
- Dave Baugh 7.42
- Tony Boyle 7.11
- Steve Wilcock 5.75
- Andy Cowan 5.55
- Alan Knapkin 5.48
- Mick Fielding 4.49
- Brenton Langlois 4.34
- Dave Parkin 3.06
- Barry Weaver 1.82

Canterbury

- Les Rumsey 9.90
- Dave Gooderham 8.63
- Barney Kennett 8.23
- Graham Clifton 5.31
- Bob Spelta 5.11
- Jimmy Squibb 5.00
- Gerald Purkiss 4.85
- Terry Casserley 3.77

Coatbridge

- Brian Collins 9.46
- Mitch Shirra 8.37
- Jimmy Gallacher 7.54
- Grahame Dawson 6.39
- Mick McKeon 5.64
- Doug Templeton 4.94
- John Wilson 4.73
- Paul Heller 4.00
- Eddie Argall 3.90
- Derek Richardson 3.71
- Barry Booth 1.68

Crayford

- Laurie Etheridge 9.74
- Alan Sage 8.51
- Trevor Barnwell 7.72
- Pete Wigley 6.26
- Bob Young 5.86
- Les Ott 5.78
- Alan Johns 5.68
- George Barclay 5.34
- Dave Shepherd 4.92
- Bill Archer 4.11

Crewe

- Graham Drury 8.70
- Chris Turner 8.13
- Nigel Wasley 7.75
- Chris Emery 6.3
- Ricky Day 6.06
- Stuart Cope 5.83
- Les Collins 5.25
- Max Brown 4.99
- Geoff Ambrose 4.96
- Cliff Anderson 4.90
- Ian Robertson 3.27

Eastbourne

- Paul Gachet 9.87
- Neil Middleditch 9.62
- Steve Weatherley 8.07
- Pete Jarman 7.32
- Mike Sampson 7.28
- Eric Dugard 5.49
- Colin Richardson 5.24
- Terry Barclay 3.78

Ellesmere Port

- John Jackson 9.78
- Colin Goad 7.13
- Wayne Hughes 6.76
- Nicky Allott 6.41
- Duncan Meredith 5.78
- Mick McKeon 4.86
- Steve Casey 4.52
- Gerald Smitherman 4.37
- Barry Booth 4.00
- Andy Reid 3.68

Mildenhall

- Bob Coles 8.82
- Chris Julian 6.74
- Stan Stevens 6.02
- John Gibbons 5.93
- Kevin Jolly 5.76
- John McNeill 4.77
- Paul Clipstone 3.59
- Paul Gilbert 3.43
- Fred Mills 2.97

Newcastle

- Joe Owen 10.65
- Tom Owen 10.65
- Brian Havelock 6.72
- Ron Henderson 5.81
- Mike Watkin 5.59
- Robbie Blackadder 5.45
- Tim Swales 5.23
- Phil Micheledies 5.05

Paisley

- Sid Sheldrick 8.00
- Mike Fullerton 7.20
- Alan Bridgett 7.12
- Chris Roynon 6.00
- Tom Davie 5.26
- Bernie Foot 5.20
- Stuart Mountford 4.47
- Mick Sheldrick 4.00
- Geoff Snider 4.00

Peterborough

- Brian Clark 9.00
- Russ Osborne 7.14
- Roy Carter 6.67
- Ken Matthews 6.66
- Mike Cake 5.53
- Jack Walker 4.70
- Ian Clark 4.36
- Roy Sizmore 4.33
- Steve Taylor 3.52
- Phil Cornwell 1.33

Rye House

- Brian Foote 8.39
- Hugh Saunders 7.46
- Bob Cooper 6.75
- Kelvin Mullarkey 6.25
- Tiger Beech 5.69
- John Gibbons 5.25
- Bob Young 4.73
- Dingle Brown 4.62
- Karl Fiala 4.58
- Barry Duke 4.33
- Steve Clarke 3.87

Scunthorpe

- Tony Childs 8.35
- Keith Evans 7.52
- Ken McKinlay 6.46
- Andy Hines 5.99
- Colin Cook 5.91
- Tony Gillias 5.55
- Andy Sims 5.38
- Ray Watkins 4.24
- Chris Emery 4.13
- Ian Silk 2.09

Stoke

- Alan Molyneux 10.14
- Steve Bastable 8.04
- Steve Holden 7.92
- Andy Cusworth 7.52
- Jack Millen 6.96
- Phil Bass 6.93
- Jim Wells 6.55
- Mick Handley 6.09
- Alan Bridgett 4.62

Teesside

- Tom Leadbitter 9.40
- Doug Underwood 8.34
- Alan Emerson 8.33
- Roger Wright 7.68
- Dave Durham 6.05
- Pete Reading 5.69
- Harry Maclean 5.25
- Trevor Stead 3.44
- David Levings 3.08
- Colin Pestell 2.83
- Ian Silk 2.29

Weymouth

- Martin Yeates 8.31
- Brian Woodward 7.77
- Vic Harding 6.82
- Chris Robins 5.15
- Geoff Swindells 4.77
- Nigel Couzens 4.73
- Melvin Soffe 4.24
- Tony Freegard 3.59
- Ricky Owen 3.09
- Roger Stratton 2.86

Workington

- Lou Sansom 8.81
- Taffy Owen 8.37
- Robbie Gardner 7.38
- Kym Amundson 6.94
- Mick Newton .6.63
- Roger Wright 6.24
- Terry Kelly 6.07
- Steve Watson 4.42
- Steve Lawson 3.64

== See also ==
- List of United Kingdom Speedway League Champions
- Knockout Cup (speedway)
