= 1976 National League season =

British motorcycle speedway season

- League: National League
- No. of competitors: 18
- Champions: Newcastle Diamonds
- Knockout Cup: Newcastle Diamonds
- Individual: Joe Owen
- Pairs: Ellesmere Port Gunners
- Fours: Newcastle Diamonds
- Highest average: Joe Owen
- Division/s above: 1976 British League

The 1976 National League was contested as the second division of Speedway in the United Kingdom having been renamed from the previous season's moniker of New National League.

== Summary ==
The league was reduced from 20 teams down to 18, following the loss of three teams and gain of one. Birmingham Brummies moved up to the British League and Bradford Barons and Crewe Kings both closed down. Sadly for Crewe the team would never return. The additional team was the Oxford Cheetahs, who had returned to their traditional name following a three year period known as the Oxford Rebels. The Rebels team and promoters had moved to White City during the winter but Oxford were saved by new promoters Harry Bastable and Tony Allsop after a committee of fans had created a "Save Our Stadium" campaign over the previous winter.

Newcastle Diamonds comfortably won their first National League title, completing a cup double, and dropping only seven points. The Owen brothers Joe Owen and Tom Owen topped the averages for the second consecutive year. Joe finished with an 11+ average and won the British League Division Two Riders Championship and Newcastle completed the league and cup double.

== Final table ==
Pos	Team	PL	W	D	L	Pts
1	Newcastle Diamonds	34	30	1	3	61
2	Ellesmere Port Gunners	34	24	1	9	49
3	Workington Comets	34	20	1	13	41
4	Canterbury Crusaders	34	20	0	14	40
5	Rye House Rockets	34	17	2	15	36
6	Crayford Kestrels	34	17	1	16	35
7	Coatbridge Tigers	34	17	1	16	35
8	Eastbourne Eagles	34	17	0	17	34
9	Peterborough Panthers	34	16	2	16	34
10	Berwick Bandits	34	17	0	17	34
11	Stoke Potters	34	15	1	18	31
12	Boston Barracudas	34	15	1	18	31
13	Mildenhall Fen Tigers	34	15	1	18	31
14	Oxford Cheetahs	34	14	1	19	29
15	Weymouth Wizards	34	11	2	21	24
16	Paisley Lions	34	12	0	22	24
17	Scunthorpe Saints	34	11	1	22	23
18	Teesside Tigers	34	10	0	24	20

== Fixtures and results ==
Home \ Away	BER	BOS	CAN	COA	CRY	EAS	EP	MIL	NEW	OX	PAI	PET	RH	SCU	STO	TEE	WEY	WOR
Berwick		47–31	39–38	44–33	52–25	45–33	41–37	48–30	36–40	46–32	48–29	46–32	44–34	48–30	46–32	51–27	42–36	49–29
Boston	52–26		57–21	47–31	41–37	54–24	38–40	41–37	34–44	40–37	46–32	40–38	40–38	43–32	39–39	52–26	43–35	42–36
Canterbury	51–27	46–31		54–24	38–40	45–32	58–20	46–32	38–40	53–25	57–21	46–32	44–34	47–31	40–37	63–14	49–29	40–38
Coatbridge	48–29	51–26	56–22		60–18	45–32	40–37	56–22	32–46	40–38	43–35	47–31	42–35	47–31	41–37	53–24	56–19	38–40
Crayford	62–16	44–34	48–30	51–25		36–42	51–27	45–33	40–38	49–27	51–27	39–39	40–38	58–29	46–32	50–27	54–24	46–29
Eastbourne	50–26	42–36	53–24	59–19	57–21		50–28	45–33	38–40	49–29	54–24	41–36	45–33	59–19	52–26	46–32	55–23	41–35
Ellesmere Port	40–38	43–35	57–21	57–21	47–31	42–35		55–23	42–36	51–27	52–26	46–32	56–22	45–32	55–23	49–29	55–23	38.5–38.5
Mildenhall	42–36	38–40	55–23	41–37	40–37	50–28	34–44		41–37	48–30	50–28	38–40	48–30	43–35	40–38	49–28	48–30	41–37
Newcastle	43–35	53–25	62–16	52–26	53–25	55–23	48–30	54–24		54–24	55–22	47–31	57–21	57–21	53–25	60–18	57–21	46–32
Oxford	56–22	42–36	41–37	49–29	42–36	53–25	47–30	41–37	30–48		56–22	44–34	39–39	41–37	50–27	43–35	51–27	35–43
Paisley	35–43	52–25	38–40	29–49	43–35	41–37	32–46	53–24	25–53	48–30		49–29	43–35	48–29	40–37	50–27	48–30	49–29
Peterborough	47–31	44–33	47–31	39–39	60–18	49–29	36–42	49–29	36–42	40–0+	60–18		47–30	45–33	42–36	46–32	52–26	46–32
Rye House	59–19	48–30	38–40	53–23	40–38	44–33	36–39	49–29	39–39	46–32	59–19	53–25		53–25	42–35	50–28	54.5–23.5	55–23
Scunthorpe	41–36	50–28	38–40	48–29	41–37	48–30	38–40	47–31	25–53	43–35	46–31	37–41	14–16+		49–27	54–24	39–39	34–43
Stoke	53–25	43–35	43–35	42–36	43–33	43–35	40–38	45–33	29–49	45–33	57–21	41–37	42–36	38–40		40–38	37–41	55–23
Teesside	45–32	40–38	37–41	45–33	36–42	41–37	33–45	37–40	36–42	43–34	60–18	43–35	32–45	40–38	40–38		48–29	34–43
Weymouth	42–33	43–34	38–40	38–40	41–37	49–29	38–40	39–39	33–45	41–36	55–23	46–32	34–43	50–28	37–41	44–34		41–37
Workington	46–32	46–32	48–30	50–27	44–34	57–21	44–33	50–28	34–44	50–28	45–33	56–22	52–26	53–25	40–38	48–30	55–22	

Legend: Blue = home team win; Yellow = draw; Red = away team win.

+Oxford/Scunthorpe refused to ride

== Top five riders (league averages) ==
	Rider	Nat	Team	C.M.A.
1	Joe Owen	(England)	Newcastle	11.55
2	Tom Owen	(England)	Newcastle	10.28
3	Steve Weatherley	(England)	Eastbourne	10.27
4	John Jackson	(England)	Ellesmere Port	10.20
5	Laurie Etheridge	(England)	Crayford	9.96

== National League Knockout Cup ==
The 1976 Speedway Star Knockout Cup was the ninth edition of the Knockout Cup for tier two teams. Newcastle Diamonds were the winners of the competition.

First round

Date	Team one	Score	Team two
22/04	Oxford	48-30	Weymouth
20/04	Weymouth	40-38	Oxford

Second round

Date	Team one	Score	Team two
01/06	Ellesmere Port	46-32	Paisley
27/05	Stoke	37-41	Newcastle
24/05	Newcastle	59-19	Stoke
23/05	Mildenhall	38-40	Peterborough
22/05	Paisley	36-42	Ellesmere Port
21/05	Peterborough	42-36	Mildenhall
17/05	Scunthorpe	43-35	Berwick
16/05	Eastbourne	41-37	Oxford
16/05	Workington	46-32	Coatbridge
14/05	Coatbridge	33-45	Workington
13/05	Oxford	47-31	Eastbourne
11/05	Crayford	46-32	Boston
09/05	Boston	48-30	Crayford
02/05	Rye House	45-32	Canterbury
01/05	Berwick	45-32	Scunthorpe
01/05	Canterbury	44-34	Rye House
23/04	Coatbridge	52-25	Teesside
22/04	Teesside	46-32	Coatbridge

Quarter-finals

Date	Team one	Score	Team two
23/07	Workington	46-31	Boston
20/07	Ellesmere Port	50-28	Rye House
18/07	Rye House	38-39	Ellesmere Port
17/07	Berwick	48-30	Oxford
11/07	Boston	48-29	Workington
08/07	Oxford	40-38	Berwick
05/07	Newcastle	47-31	Peterborough
25/06	Peterborough	39-39	Newcastle

Semi-finals

Date	Team one	Score	Team two
05/09	Boston	42-35	Berwick
28/08	Berwick	49-29	Boston
17/08	Ellesmere Port	41-37	Newcastle
16/08	Newcastle	46-31	Ellesmere Port

=== Final ===
First leg

18 September 1976

Berwick Bandits Mike Hiftle 10 Graham Jones 10 Dave Gifford 9 Willie Templeton 5 Eddie Argall 5 Robin Adlington 4 Wayne Brown 0	43 – 35	Newcastle Diamonds Joe Owen 15 Tom Owen 14 Robbie Blackadder 3 Phil Michelidies 1 Andy Cusworth 1 Tim Swales 1 Ron Henderson R/R

Shielfield Park

Second leg

27 September 1976

Newcastle Diamonds Joe Owen 12 Tom Owen 12 Ron Henderson 6 Tim Swales 5 Andy Cusworth 5 Robbie Blackadder 4 Phil Michelidies 4	48 – 29	Berwick Bandits Eddie Argall 11 Roger Wright (guest) 6 Dave Gifford 6 Graham Jones 4 Willie Templeton 2 Peter Waite 0 Mike Hiftle R/R

Brough Park

Newcastle were declared Knockout Cup Champions, winning on aggregate 83–72.

== Riders' Championship ==
Joe Owen won the Riders' Championship, sponsored by Gauloises and held at Wimbledon Stadium on 2 October.

Pos.	Rider	Pts	Total
1	(England) Joe Owen	3 3 3 3 2	14
2	(England) John Jackson	3 3 0 3 3	12+3
3	(England) Ted Hubbard	1 2 3 3 3	12+2
4	(England) Alan Emerson	2 2 3 2 2	11
5	(England) Steve Weatherley	2 3 1 3 1	10
6	(England) Brian Clark	2 2 2 1 3	10
7	(Australia) Lou Sansom	3 0 2 2 2	9
8	(England) Rob Hollingworth	1 1 1 2 3	8
9	(England) Les Rumsey	3 0 2 1 1	7
10	(England) Bob Coles	1 1 2 1 2	7
11	(Scotland) Brian Collins	2 3 0 0 1	6
12	(England) Laurie Etheridge	1 2 3 0 0	6
13	(England) Martin Yeates	0 1 0 1 1	3
14	(England) Graham Jones	0 1 1 0 0	2
15	(Australia) Carl Askew (res)	0 2 0	2
16	(England) Keith Evans	0 0 1	1
17	(England) Les Collins	0	0
18	(England) Ian Williams (res)	0 0 0	0

- f=fell, r-retired, ex=excluded, ef=engine failure

== Pairs ==
The National League Pairs was held at Hyde Road on 5 June and was won by Ellesmere Port Gunners.

Group A
Pos	Team	Pts	Riders
1	Ellesmere P	11	Jackson 7 Turner 4
2	Eastbourne	10	Weatherley 9 Jarman 1
3	Peterborough	10	Clark 7 Featherstone 3
4	Teesside	5	Emerson 5 Reading 0

Group B
Pos	Team	Pts	Riders
1	Newcastle	15	Owen J 9 Owen T 6
2	Boston	9	Burton 5 Hollingworth 4
3	Scunthorpe	8	Featherstone 6 Baugh 3
4	Coatbridge	4	Dawson 3 Collins 1

Group C
Pos	Team	Pts	Riders
1	Workington	11	Sansom 6 Goad 5
2	Paisley	9	Farquharson 9 Sheldrick 0
3	Berwick	8	Hiftle 5 Adlington 3
4	Rye House	8	Hubbard 7 Foote 1

Group D
Pos	Team	Pts	Riders
1	Mildenhall	12	Coles 8 Jolly 4
2	Stoke	10	Collins L 8 Millen 2
3	Weymouth	9	Yeates 8 Harding 1
4	Crayford	5	Etheridge 4 Johns 1

Semi finals

- Ellesmere Port bt Workington
- Newcastle bt Mildenhall

Final

- Ellesmere Port bt Newcastle

== Fours ==
Newcastle won the fours championship final, held at King's Lynn Stadium on 17 July.

Semi finals

- SF1 = Ellesmere Port 17, Workington 15, Rye House 10, Peterborough 5
- SF2 = Newcastle 17, Eastbourne 13, Coatbridge 9, Boston 9

Final

Pos	Team	Pts	Riders
1	Newcastle	18	Owen T 6, Owen J 6, Cusworth 3, Michelides 3
2	Eastbourne	13	Weatherley 5, Sampson 4, Richardson 4, Dugard 0, Jarman 0
3	Ellesmere Port	12	Jackson 6, Gardner 3, Turner 2, Finch 1
4	Workington	5	Lawson 4, Goad 1, Havelock 0, Kelly 0

== Leading final averages ==
	Rider	Nat	Team	C.M.A.
1	Joe Owen	(England)	Newcastle	11.54
2	Tom Owen	(England)	Newcastle	10.43
3	Steve Weatherley	(England)	Eastbourne	10.35
4	John Jackson	(England)	Ellesmere Port	10.08
5	Laurie Etheridge	(England)	Crayford	9.87

== Riders & final averages ==
Berwick

- Graham Jones 8.12
- Dave Gifford 7.91
- Mike Hiftle 7.17
- Robin Adlington 6.84
- Willie Templeton 6.63
- Eddie Argall 6.54
- Keith Williams 2.00
- Peter Waite 1.80
- Wayne Brown 1.71

Boston

- Rob Hollingworth 9.63
- Billy Burton 8.26
- Paul Gilbert 6.58
- Stuart Cope 5.82
- Trevor Whiting 5.57
- Chris Emery 5.56
- Steve Clarke 5.28
- Ron Cooper 5.00
- Dave Allen 3.46

Canterbury

- Graham Banks 8.06
- Steve Koppe 7.85
- Les Rumsey 7.50
- Barney Kennett 6.84
- Graham Clifton 6.55
- Reg Luckhurst 6.51
- Bob Spelta 5.47
- Terry Casserley 5.13

Coatbridge

- Brian Collins 9.09
- Grahame Dawson 7.91
- Mick McKeon 6.79
- Jimmy Gallacher 5.68
- Derek Richardson 5.65
- Max Brown 5.18
- Doug Templeton 5.18
- Rob Maxfield 5.02
- Benny Rourke 4.83
- John Wilson 2.93

Crayford

- Laurie Etheridge 9.87
- Alan Sage 8.78
- Mike Broadbank 7.33
- Pete Wigley 7.22
- Alan Johns 6.54
- Trevor Barnwell 5.71
- Bill Archer 5.45
- Richard Davey 4.71
- Gary Spencer 4.10
- John Hooper 3.09
- Dave Shepherd 2.77

Eastbourne

- Steve Weatherley 10.35
- Eric Dugard 7.03
- Pete Jarman 6.75
- Colin Richardson 6.50
- Mike Sampson 6.49
- Ian Gledhill 6.43
- Steve Naylor 5.45
- Roger Abel 5.27
- Ian Fletcher 4.32

Ellesmere Port

- John Jackson 10.08
- Chris Turner 9.35
- Steve Finch 8.07
- Robbie Gardner 7.45
- Duncan Meredith 6.09
- Gerald Smitherman 5.80
- Phil Collins 4.33
- Geoff Jones 3.71
- Louis Carr 2.78

Mildenhall

- Bob Coles 9.21
- Kevin Jolly 8.41
- Trevor Jones 7.88
- Alan Cowland 6.24
- Fred Mills 5.67
- John Gibbons 5.54
- Stan Stevens 5.13
- Robert Henry 4.93
- Mick Bates 4.81
- Neil Leeks 3.54

Newcastle

- Joe Owen 11.54
- Tom Owen 10.43
- Ron Henderson 8.33
- Phil Micheledies 7.54
- Brian Havelock 7.51
- Andy Cusworth 7.40
- Robbie Blackadder 6.20
- Tim Swales 5.91

Oxford

- Carl Askew 8.03
- Brian Leonard 7.33
- Phil Bass 7.14
- Mick Handley 7.02
- Malcolm Corradine 6.10
- Roy Sizmore 5.91
- Jim Wells 5.88
- Kevin Young 5.47
- Steve Holden 3.69

Paisley

- Colin Farquharson 8.22
- Mick Fishwick 6.99
- Stuart Mountford 6.79
- Mike Fullerton 5.37
- Alan Bridgett 5.17
- Sid Sheldrick 5.10
- Malcolm Chambers 3.96
- Chris Roynon 3.91
- Mick Sheldrick 3.83
- Colin Caffrey 3.16
- Tom Davie 2.34

Peterborough

- Brian Clark 9.37
- Tony Featherstone 8.11
- Ian Clark 6.93
- Roy Carter 6.85
- Ken Matthews 6.53
- Steve Taylor 6.42
- Kevin Hawkins 5.33
- Nigel Couzens 5.11
- Alan Cowland 4.24
- Paul Cooper 4.19
- Russ Osborne 4.15

Rye House

- Ted Hubbard 9.17
- Kelvin Mullarkey 7.55
- Hugh Saunders 7.47
- Brian Foote 7.03
- Karl Fiala 6.73
- Bobby Garrad 6.13
- Bob Cooper 5.11
- Ashley Pullen 4.91

Scunthorpe

- Keith Evans 9.27
- Andy Hines 6.77
- Tony Boyle 5.97
- Phil Kynman 5.72
- Colin Cook 5.34
- Sid Sheldrick 5.10
- Ray Watkins 4.98
- Tony Gillias 4.75

Stoke

- Les Collins 9.31
- Jack Millen 7.90
- Malcolm Corradine 7.35
- Ricky Day 6.07
- Jim Brett 5.74
- Mick Newton 5.69
- Steve McDermott 5.33
- Tim Nunan 5.01
- Colin Meredith 4.82

Teesside

- Alan Emerson 8.41
- Tom Leadbitter 7.67
- Steve Wilcock 5.85
- Pete Reading 5.54
- Andy Cowan 5.27
- Pete Smith 4.92
- Nigel Close 4.78
- John Robson 2.95
- Martyn Cusworth 2.50

Weymouth

- Martin Yeates 8.69
- Vic Harding 7.18
- Chris Robins 7.07
- Gerald Purkiss 6.25
- Danny Kennedy 5.82
- Billy Spiers 5.32
- Garry May 3.51
- Trevor Vincent/Charley 3.94
- Jack Walker 3.54
- Roger Stratton 3.47

Workington

- Lou Sansom 8.77
- Steve Lawson 8.72
- Taffy Owen 8.07
- Colin Goad 7.67
- Brian Havelock 7.67
- Roger Wright 6.54
- Terry Kelly 5.57
- Chris Bevan 3.80
- Stewart Collin 3.16

== See also ==
- List of United Kingdom Speedway League Champions
- Knockout Cup (speedway)
