= 1973 British League Division Two season =

British motorcycle speedway season

- League: British League Division Two
- No. of competitors: 18
- Champions: Boston Barracudas
- Knockout Cup: Boston Barracudas
- Individual: Arthur Price
- North Eastern Trophy: Teesside Tigers
- Highest average: Lou Sansom
- Division/s above: British League (Div 1)

The 1973 British League Division Two season was the second tier of motorcycle speedway in Great Britain.

== Summary ==
The 1973 season saw the league expanded to 18 teams with the addition of Chesterton Potters. The team had last raced during the 1963 Provincial Speedway League season under the name of the Stoke Potters. Barrow Happy Faces became Barrow Bombers, Teesside Teessiders became Teesside Tigers.

Boston Barracudas won their first title and went on to win the league and cup double. Boston had finished runner-up to Crewe Kings the previous season, with decent season averages recorded by five riders Arthur Price, Jim Ryman, Carl Glover, Russ Osborne and Ray Bales. With a largely unchanged team, they went one place better by sealing the league title. Boston won easily, 14 points clear of their nearest rival, and four of the five riders improved their averages from 1972. Arthur Price also won the Riders' Championship.

== Final table ==
Pos	Team	PL	Home					Away					Pts
Pos	Team	PL	W	D	L	F	A	W	D	L	F	A	Pts
1	Boston Barracudas	33	17	0	0	853	471	12	0	4	590	653	58
2	Workington Comets	34	16	1	0	841	481	5	1	11	690	634	44
3	Eastbourne Eagles	34	17	0	0	791	532	2	2	13	762	558	40
4	Peterborough Panthers	34	16	0	1	813	518	3	1	13	731	592	39
5	Birmingham Brummies	34	16	0	1	867	456	3	0	14	734	585	38
6	Teesside Tigers	34	16	0	1	827	499	3	0	14	763	562	38
7	Bradford Northern	34	16	0	1	805	519	2	0	15	770	553	36
8	Crewe Kings	34	17	0	0	785	538	0	1	16	820	503	35
9	Long Eaton Rangers	33	14	0	2	743	499	2	1	14	831	493	33
10	Barrow Bombers	34	15	0	2	822	499	0	2	15	769	553	32
11	Sunderland Stars	34	15	1	1	777	548	0	1	16	833	489	32
12	Hull Vikings	34	10	3	4	707	613	3	2	13	775	550	31
13	Chesterton Potters	34	11	1	5	711	611	3	0	14	784	540	29
14	Ellesmere Port Gunners	34	11	0	6	737	586	3	0	14	781	543	28
15	Canterbury Crusaders	34	11	1	5	718	603	2	1	14	797	526	28
16	Scunthorpe Saints	34	12	1	4	727	598	0	0	17	828	495	25
17	Berwick Bandits	34	11	1	5	713	609	0	0	17	890	435	23
18	Rayleigh Rockets	34	9	3	5	733	592	0	0	17	823	509	21

== Fixtures and results ==
Home \ Away	BAR	BER	BIR	BOS	BRA	CAN	CHE	CK	EAS	EP	HV	LE	PET	RAY	SCU	SUN	TEE	WOR
Barrow		46–32	47–31	27–49	45–33	55–23	44–34	58–20	54–24	52–25	57–20	58–20	39–38	56–22	60–18	41–37	49–29	34–44
Berwick	41–37		42–35	37–41	43–35	39–38	51–27	48–29	37–41	38–40	37–41	43–35	49–29	50–28	41–37	42–35	36–42	39–39
Birmingham	56–22	53–25		36–42	48–30	55–23	49–28	52–26	41–37	48–30	55–23	57–21	47–30	55–22	56–22	63–15	40–38	56–22
Boston	55–22	47–31	57–21		49–28	49–29	55–23	44–34	48–30	57–21	45–33	56–22	42–36	50–28	56–22	50–28	46–32	47–31
Bradford	45–33	60–18	46–32	38–40		49–29	40–37	54–24	43–35	44–34	53–25	45–33	46–32	56–22	44–34	49–29	51–27	42–35
Canterbury	39–38	47–30	37–41	32–46	36–42		37–41	51–27	42–35	42–36	50–28	50–28	39–39	49–29	40–37	49–29	38–39	40–38
Chesterton	45–33	52–26	41–37	38–40	43–35	45–33		41–36	47–31	37–40	39–39	37–40	37–41	40–38	43–34	49–29	44–34	33–45
Crewe	42–36	48–30	39–38	42–36	46.5–31.5	52–26	53–25		48–30	42–36	48–30	53–25	43–35	48–30	42–36	50–27	46–32	43–35
Eastbourne	40–37	55–23	42–35	40–38	49–29	43–35	43–35	48–29		51–27	52–26	51–27	50–28	42–36	47–31	53–25	45–33	40–38
Ellesmere Port	49–28	46–32	38–40	38–39	52–26	31–47	35–43	41–37	49–29		36–42	54–24	46–32	41–37	48–30	57–20	41–37	35–43
Hull	39–39	60–18	38–40	43–34	42–35	39–39	37–41	48–30	39–39	41–37		46–32	32–45	40–37	40–37	43–35	38–40	42–35
Long Eaton	47–31	55–23	44–34	v–v	54–24	41–37	56–22	41–37	51–22	34–44	36–42		45–33	50–27	49–29	58–20	41–37	41–37
Peterborough	44–34	49–29	39–36	37–41	49–29	51–27	51–27	41–37	49–29	44–34	51–27	52–26		58–29	53–25	47–30	55–23	43–35
Rayleigh	43–35	52–26	45–33	38–40	36.5–41.5	36–42	41–37	39–39	34–44	56–22	39–39	39–39	50–28		52–26	47–31	48–30	38–40
Scunthorpe	48–30	54–24	42–36	34–43	45–33	51–27	51–27	55–23	44–34	44–34	43–35	36–42	19–59	40–38		39–39	49–29	33–45
Sunderland	44–34	54–24	40–37	31–47	40–38	59–19	43–35	53–25	39–39	51–27	45–33	56–22	45–33	45–33	49–29		42–36	41–37
Teesside	53–25	58–20	44–34	38–40	47–31	45–33	48–30	56–22	51–27	49–29	44–34	45–33	56–22	56–22	53–25	41–37		43–35
Workington	39–39	54–24	53–25	41–37	45–32	57–19	50–28	50–28	46–32	51–27	45–33	53–24	46–32	47–31	55–23	55–23	54–24	

Legend: Blue = home team win; Yellow = draw; Red = away team win.

== Top five riders (leading averages) ==
	Rider	Nat	Team	C.M.A.
1	Lou Sansom	(Australia)	Workington Comets	10.56
2	Alan Knapkin	(England)	Bradford Northern	10.04
3	Jack Millen	(New Zealand)	Sunderland	9.80
4	Carl Glover	(England)	Boston	9.56
5	Ken McKinlay	(Scotland)	Scunthorpe	9.50

== British League Division Two Knockout Cup ==
The 1973 British League Division Two Knockout Cup was the sixth edition of the Knockout Cup for tier two teams. Boston Barracudas were the winners of the competition.

First round

Date	Team one	Score	Team two
19/05	Canterbury	44-34	Eastbourne
13/05	Eastbourne	37-41	Canterbury

Second round

Date	Team one	Score	Team two
03/06	Boston	58-20	Crewe
04/06	Crewe	44-34	Boston
08/06	Peterborough	56-22	Barrow
05/06	Barrow	45-32	Peterborough
13/06	Bradford	48-29	Ellesmere Port
05/06	Ellesmere Port	42-35	Bradford
04/06	Birmingham	46-32	Scunthorpe
03/06	Scunthorpe	38-40	Birmingham
08/06	Workington	45-33	Berwick
09/06	Berwick	42-36	Workington
31/05	Teesside	48-30	Sunderland
08/06	Sunderland	38-40	Teesside
09/06	Rayleigh	46-32	Hull
30/05	Hull	43-34	Rayleigh
07/06	Long Eaton	48-30	Canterbury
09/06	Canterbury	42-36	Long Eaton

Quarter-finals

Date	Team one	Score	Team two
24/06	Boston	50-28	Peterborough
29/06	Peterborough	37-41	Boston
04/07	Bradford	48-30	Birmingham
02/07	Birmingham	47-31	Bradford
27/07	Workington	53-25	Teesside
26/07	Teesside	44-33	Workington
21/07	Rayleigh	49-29	Long Eaton
26/07	Long Eaton	36-42	Rayleigh

Semi-finals

Date	Team one	Score	Team two
19/08	Boston	46-32	Bradford
22/08	Bradford	43-35	Boston
30/08	Workington	60-18	Rayleigh
18/08	Rayleigh	43-35	Workington

Final first leg

23 September 1973

Boston Barracudas Carl Glover 15 Ray Bales 13 Arthur Price 10 Russ Osborne 10 Dave Piddock 5 David Gagen 5 Jim Ryman R/R	58 – 19	Workington Comets Lou Sansom 7 Malcolm Mackay 5 Kym Amundson 4 Steve Watson 3 Taffy Owen 0 Mitch Graham 0 Bernie Hornby 0

Boston Sports Stadium

Final second leg

28 September 1973

Workington Comets Lou Sansom 12 Malcolm Mackay 10 Mitch Graham 7 Taffy Owen 6 Kym Amundson 5 Steve Watson 6 Bernie Hornby 1	47 – 31	Boston Barracudas Carl Glover 16 Arthur Price 6 Ray Bales 4 Dave Piddock 2 Russ Osborne 1 David Gagen 1 Les Glover 1 Jim Ryman R/R

Derwent Park

Boston were declared Knockout Cup Champions, winning on aggregate 89–66.

== Leading final averages ==
	Rider	Nat	Team	C.M.A.
1	Lou Sansom	(Australia)	Workington	10.50
2	Alan Knapkin	(England)	Bradford Northern	10.03
3	Jack Millen	(New Zealand)	Sunderland	9.74
4	Ken McKinlay	(Scotland)	Scunthorpe	9.69
5	Carl Glover	(England)	Boston	9.62

== Riders' Championship ==
Arthur Price won the Rider's Championship, held at Wimbledon Stadium on 6 October.

Pos.	Rider	Pts	Total
1	(England) Arthur Price	3 2 1 3 3	12+3
2	(England) Bobby McNeil	2 3 3 1 3	12+2
3	(Australia) Lou Sansom	3 1 2 3 3	12+1
4	(England) Bruce Forrester	3 3 3 2 f	11
5	(England) Dave Baugh	3 2 3 3 f	11
6	(England) Mike Broadbanks	1 0 3 3 3	10
7	(England) Richard Greer	2 3 1 2 2	10
8	(Wales) Graham Drury	0 3 2 2 2	9
9	(England) Arthur Browning	1 1 2 1 2	7
10	(England) Barney Kennett	1 0 1 2 1	5
11	(England) Geoff Bouchard	0 2 0 1 2	5
12	(Scotland) Ken McKinlay	ef 2 2 0	4
13	(England) Dave Morton	2 1 ex	3
14	(New Zealand) Jim Wells (res)	2 0 0 1 0	3
15	(Scotland) Willie Templeton (res)	1 0 1 1	3
16	(England) Tom Owen	fx 0 f 1	1
17	(England) Dave Mills	1 f	1
18	(England) Bob Young (res)	1 f	1

- f=fell, r-retired, ex=excluded, ef=engine failure

== North Eastern Trophy ==
		M	W	D	L	Pts
1	Teesside	6	5	1	0	11
2	Sunderland	6	2	1	3	5
3	Hull	6	2	0	4	4
4	Berwick	6	2	0	4	4

Home \ Away	BER	HUL	SUN	TEE
Berwick		43–35	44–33	34–44
Hull	46–32		42–35	36–42
Sunderland	43–34	42–36		39–39
Teesside	57–21	40–38	40–38	

Legend: Blue = home team win; Yellow = draw; Red = away team win.

== Riders and final averages ==
Barrow

- Tom Owen 8.32
- Mike Sampson 8.31
- Terry Kelly 7.40
- Sid Sheldrick 6.98
- Chris Bailey 6.97
- Craig Pendlebury 6.50
- Joe Owen 6.21
- Chris Roynon 5.69
- Keith Evans 5.60

Berwick

- Doug Templeton 8.12
- Willie Templeton 7.38
- Andy Meldrum 7.09
- Graham Jones 4.81
- Chris Quigley 4.55
- Denny Morter 4.17
- Ettienne Olivier 4.15
- Rob Hollingworth 4.00
- Geoff Davies 2.98
- Dennis Jackson 2.14

Birmingham

- Arthur Browning 8.85
- Ted Howgego 8.62
- George Major 8.29
- John Hart 8.29
- Phil Herne 7.59
- Mike Lanham 7.23
- Malcolm Corradine 7.21
- Steve Wilson 5.78
- Terry Shearer 5.26
- Alan Grahame 3.29

Boston

- Carl Glover 9.62
- Arthur Price 9.14
- Jim Ryman 8.42
- Russ Osborne 7.85
- Dave Piddock 7.81
- Ray Bales 7.28
- David Gagen 6.94
- Tony Featherstone 6.88
- Les Glover 3.40

Bradford

- Alan Knapkin 10.03
- Dave Baugh 9.23
- Robin Adlington 7.93
- Tony Featherstone 7.74
- Brenton Langlois 5.71
- Mick Fairbairn 5.65
- Colin Meredith 5.37
- Mike Fullerton 4.75
- Tony Freegard 4.67
- Rob Maxfield 4.40
- Rod Chessell 3.45

Canterbury

- Barney Kennett 7.38
- Peter Murray 6.90
- Ted Hubbard 6.75
- Derek Cook 6.41
- Trevor Jones 6.33
- Graham Banks 5.96
- Dave Piddock 5.71
- Les Rumsey 5.71
- Gary Cottham Sr. 4.61
- Dave Gooderham 4.30

Chesterton

- Mike Broadbank 9.24
- Mick Handley 6.70
- Geoff Pusey 6.20
- Alan Bridgett 5.90
- Roger Parker 5.70
- Brian Woodward 5.52
- Cyril Francis 5.11
- Martin Yeates 4.76
- Nigel Wasley 4.15

Crewe

- John Jackson 8.55
- Geoff Ambrose 8.50
- Dave Morton 8.44
- Wayne Forrest 5.44
- Glyn Taylor 5.29
- Ian Cartwright 4.88
- Keith White 4.68
- Peter Thompson 3.78
- Cliff Anderson 3.26

Eastbourne

- Bobby McNeil 9.34
- Roger Johns 8.59
- Paul Gachet 7.32
- Trevor Geer 6.26
- Mike Vernam .5.62
- Neil Middleditch 4.82
- Eric Dugard 4.54
- Jimmy Squibb 4.17

Ellesmere Port

- Graham Drury 9.03
- Paul O'Neal 7.94
- Robbie Gardner 6.99
- Colin Goad 6.51
- Chris Morton 6.29
- Barry Booth 4.35
- Gerald Smitherman 4.24
- Roger Austin 4.14
- Wayne Hughes 3.40
- Paul Callaghan 2.29

Hull

- Dave Mills 9.29
- Tony Childs 8.49
- Alan Cowland 7.66
- Robin Amundson 7.60
- Dennis Gavros 5.55
- Pete Boston 4.58
- Dennis Wasden 4.42
- Kelvin Mullarkey 4.31
- Clark Facey 4.00
- Grahame Dawson 3.17
- Roger Austin 2.80
- Eddie Argall 1.94

Long Eaton

- Roger Mills 8.28
- Geoff Bouchard 8.20
- Norman Strachan 7.41
- Phil Bass 6.93
- Dave Harvey 6.18
- Alan Molyneux 5.55
- Alan Witt 5.55
- Joe Hughes 4.51
- Steve Bass 4.00
- Mick Moore 3.65
- Ian Teale 2.48

Peterborough

- Richard Greer 8.96
- John Davis 8.86
- Frank Smith 7.31
- Brian Clark 7.27
- Ted Howgego 6.40
- Roy Carter 6.07
- Jack Walker 5.72
- Roy Sizmore 4.00
- Ken Matthews 2.63

Rayleigh

- Peter Moore 8.30
- Bob Young 7.04
- Trevor Barnwell 6.59
- Dave "Tiger" Beech 6.12
- Les Ott 5.87
- Brian Foote 5.75
- Terry Stone 5.27
- Peter Cairns 4.96
- Pete Wigley 4.56
- Dingle Brown 4.29
- Steve Clarke 3.58

Scunthorpe

- Ken McKinlay 9.69
- Ian Hindle 8.18
- Dingle Brown 6.18
- Rod Haynes 5.87
- Jack Bywater 5.40
- Doug Underwood 4.64
- Rex Garrod 4.58
- Chris Emery 3.30

Sunderland

- Jack Millen 9.74
- Dave Gatenby 7.56
- Jim Wells 7.44
- Russ Dent 6.21
- George Barclay 6.10
- Terry Barclay 4.66
- Brian Havelock 4.64
- Peter Wrathall 4.07
- John Robson 1.14

Teesside

- Bruce Forrester 9.15
- Frank Auffret 8.61
- Roger Wright 7.47
- Pete Reading 6.85
- Dave Durham 6.35
- Tim Swales 6.12
- Russ Hodgson 5.38
- Tom Black 4.95
- Mick Moore 4.00

Workington

- Lou Sansom 10.50
- Malcolm MacKay 8.88
- Mitch Graham 8.07
- Taffy Owen 7.44
- Kym Amundson 5.51
- Steve Watson 5.41
- Bernie Hornby 3.57
- Darryl Stobbart 3.53

== See also ==
- List of United Kingdom Speedway League Champions
- Knockout Cup (speedway)
