= Steve Holden =

Steve Holden may refer to:

- Steve Holden (American football) (born 1951), American football player
- Steve Holden (speedway rider) (1952–2014), British speedway rider
- Stephen Holden (born 1941), American writer and critic
- S. D. Holden (Stephen Dewar Holden, 1870–1918), British engineer
- Steve Holden (One Life to Live), a fictional character from the American soap opera One Life to Live
