= Paisley Lions =

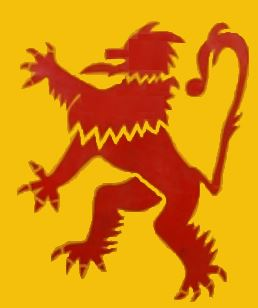

Club information
- Track address: Love Street; Paisley
- Country: Scotland
- Founded: 1975
- Closed: 1976

Club facts
- Colours: Red and Gold
- Track size: 391 metres (428 yd)

Paisley Lions were a motorcycle speedway team that participated in the British National League in 1975 and 1976. The team was based at Love Street in Paisley, Scotland, home of St Mirren F.C.

== History ==
In late 1974, Neil McFarlane, the promoter of the Coatbridge Tigers gained permission from the St Mirren FC directors to construct a speedway track aropund the football pitch. The club's colours were red and gold with a Rampant Lion and Paisley Lions were accepted into the 1975 New National League season.

The first meeting (during which the Lions raced against Birmingham Brummies) was held on 5 April 1975 in front of a crowd of over six thousand people. Sid Sheldrick led the parade on the first meet leading a lion cub called Leo on a chain.

The Lions did not enjoy a great deal of success, finishing fifteenth out of twenty clubs in the 1975 League season and sixteenth out of eighteen clubs in the 1976 National League season. Despite a brave effort by their supporters at the end of the 1976 season, the final meeting at Love Street was held on 25 September 1976 when the Lions beat Boston Barracudas 52–25.

The Paisley riders in that final meeting were: Stuart Mountford, Alan Bridgett, Mike Fishwick, Mike Fullerton, Mick Sheldrick, Colin Caffrey and Malcolm Chambers.

== Season summary ==
Year and league	Position	Notes
1975 New National League season	15th	
1976 National League season	16th	

== Notable riders ==
- Alan Bridgett
- Colin Caffrey
- Tommy Davie
- Bernie Foot
- Mike Fullerton
- Stuart Mountford
- Sid Sheldrick
- Mick Sheldrick
