= Jim Wells (speedway rider) =

New Zealand motorcycle racer (born 1951)

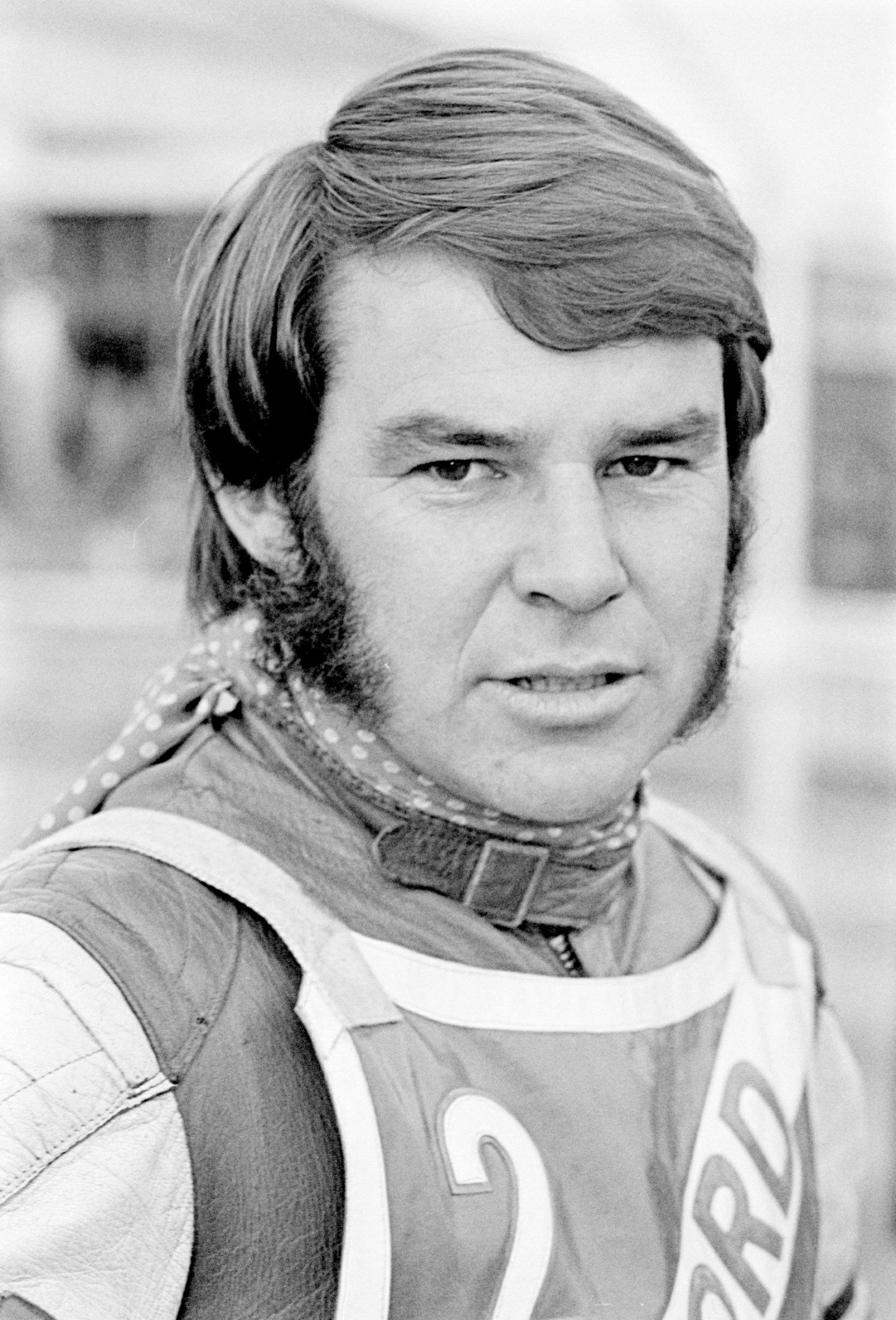
- Born: 6 March 1951 (age 75); Auckland, New Zealand
- Nationality: New Zealander

Career history
- 1972-1974: Sunderland Stars
- 1973: Halifax Dukes
- 1973: Cradley United
- 1974: Berwick Bandits
- 1975: Stoke Potters
- 1976: Oxford Cheetahs

Edward James Wells (born in Auckland, New Zealand) is a former motorcycle speedway rider in National League (speedway) and British League.

== Career ==
Wells is best known as a Sunderland Stars rider, where he rode for three seasons from 1972. The following season in 1973 saw him pick up some replacement riders with British League teams Cradley United and Halifax but he never did more at that level. In 1974, he very briefly held the track record at Sunderland in a time of 63.4, but it was quickly beaten by Birmingham Brummies John Hart in 63.2.

A transfer to Stoke Potters in 1975 saw Wells have a good season but he was to move on in 1976 with the same promoter, Harry Bastable to the newly reformed Oxford Cheetahs with Stoke teammate, Steve Holden

Before signing for Oxford, Teesside Tigers had attempted to sign Wells, but he would join Oxford, where he had his last season before retiring.

== After Speedway ==
Wells raced Bangers (a lesser form of stockcar racing) for three years. Before returning to New Zealand, he worked on the North Sea gas pipeline in Scotland. Back home, he worked in a car dealership. Married to Patricia, they have two children and three grandchildren.
