= Jordan Frampton =

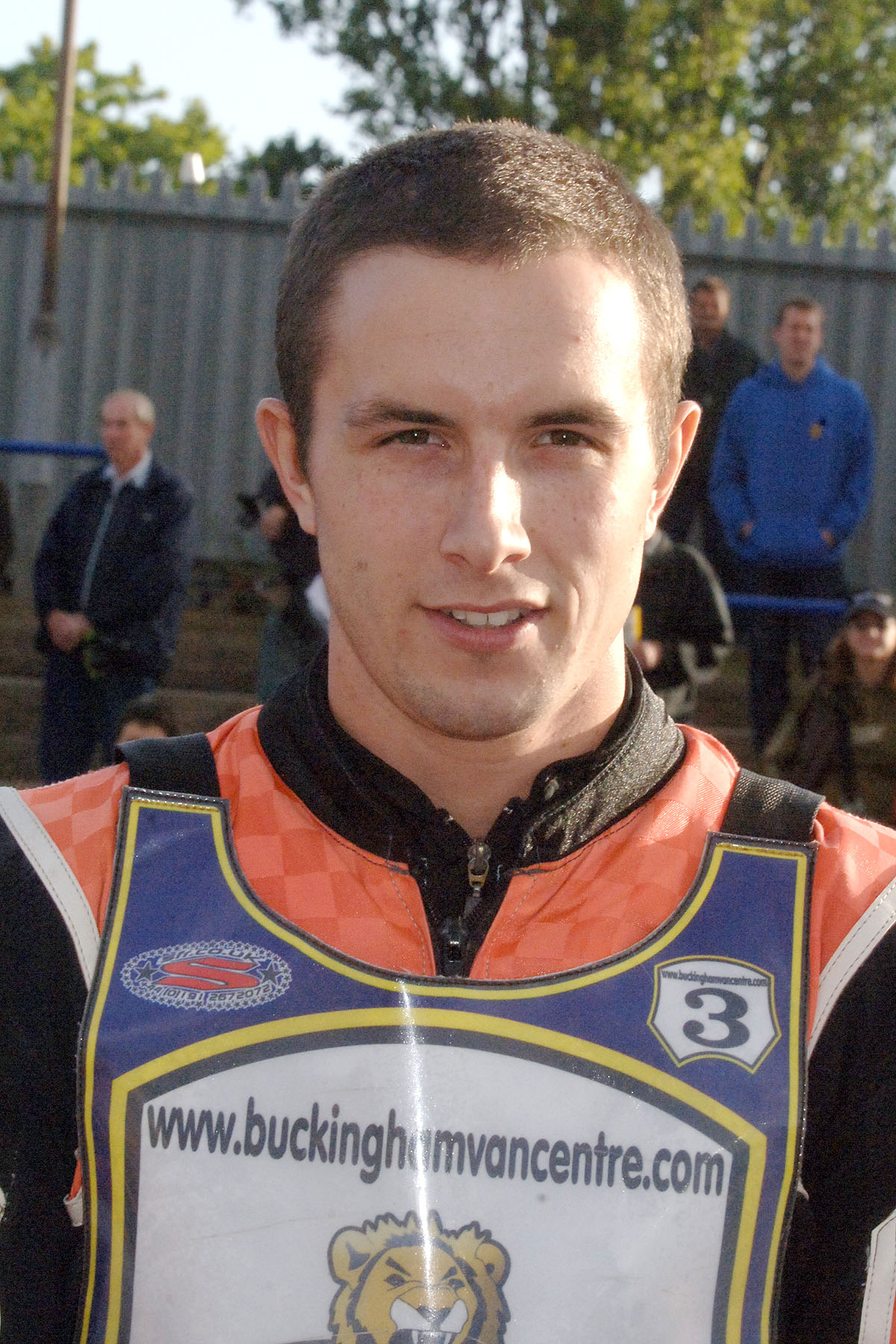
- Born: 8 March 1985 (age 41); Poole, England
- Nationality: British (English)

Career history

Great Britain
- 2004: Swindon Sprockets
- 2005: Sittingbourne Crusaders
- 2006: Mildenhall Fen Tigers
- 2006: Weymouth Wildcats
- 2007: Oxford Lions
- 2007–2008: Somerset Rebels
- 2008: Poole Pirates
- 2009: Newport Wasps
- 2009: Coventry Bees

Poland
- 2008: Rawicz

Team honours
- 2008: Premier League KO Cup

Jordan John Frampton (born 8 March 1985 in Poole, England) is a former motorcycle speedway rider from Great Britain.

== Career ==
Frampton started his speedway career in 2003, completing his first full season in 2004 with the Swindon Sprockets in the Conference League. In 2005, Frampton signed for the Sittingbourne Crusaders, also in the Conference League, where he established himself as a heat leader. At the start of 2006, Swindon and Sittingbourne dropped out of the Conference League and Frampton was left without a club until Premier League club Mildenhall Fen Tigers signed him later that year. He also ended the season riding for Weymouth Wildcats in their Conference Trophy team. The Somerset Rebels signed Frampton for their Premier League team in 2007, he also accepted an offer to ride for Oxford Lions in the Conference League. Frampton finished the year with a Premier League average of 4.89.

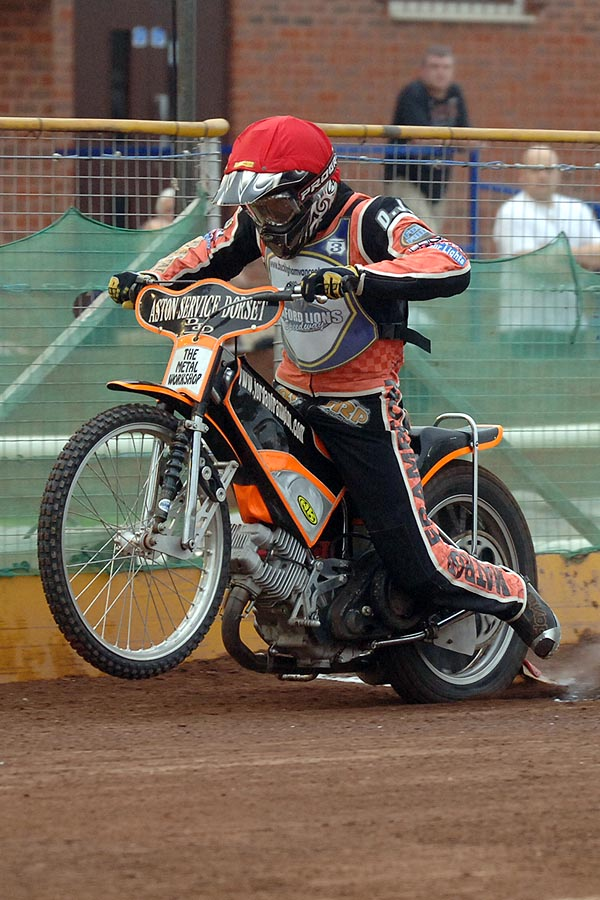
Frampton riding for Oxford in 2007

Frampton continued to ride for Somerset in the Premier League in 2008, and was also signed by his home town club, the Poole Pirates, as their number eight rider to cover for injured riders. He has also rode in Poland in 2008 for Kolejarz Rawicz. He helped Somerset win the Knockout Cup during 2008.

Frampton moved to the Newport Wasps in 2009 and doubled-up for Elite League team Coventry Bees. On 1 May 2009, it was announced he had signed a full contract with Coventry, to become a member of their asset base.

Frampton then retired from speedway in the early stages of the 2012 season.
