= Gordon Guasco =

Australian speedway rider

- Born: 24 November 1940; Sydney, New South Wales
- Died: 16 November 1970 (aged 29); Sydney, New South Wales
- Nickname: GG, Horse
- Nationality: Australian

Career history

Great Britain
- 1964: Sunderland Saints
- 1964-1966: Wolverhampton Wolves
- 1969-1970: Poole Pirates

Team honours
- 1969: British League Champion

Gordon Peter Guasco (born 24 November 1940 in Sydney, New South Wales - died, 16 November 1970 in Sydney) was a motorcycle speedway rider from Australia, who was a favourite at both the Sydney Showground Speedway and Liverpool Speedway. Guasco also rode in the United Kingdom between 1964 and 1969 for Sunderland, Wolverhampton and Poole.

== Early life ==
Guasco, known as "Smut" to his childhood friends, grew up in Horsley Park, then considered "the bush" but now a suburb of Sydney. The son of an Italian immigrant, Gordon attended Liverpool Boys' High School but left at the age of 14 to enter a sign writing apprenticeship.

Guasco's employer was a man named Des Lawrence who was also a well known Sydney speedway photographer. After Guasco started racing, it was Lawrence who suggested that he adopt the horse as his emblem to exploit his initials of "GG" (a long-held nickname for horses) and Horse was to be Guasco's nickname for the length of his racing career.

== Career ==
=== Australia ===
Guasco, who raced cycle speedway in his youth, started his senior speedway career at the Kembla Grange Speedway on the NSW South Coast in 1962, when he replaced rider John Hook in a handicap race and starting off scratch (pole) won in what was considered a reasonable time. Within just four months Guasco was starting as far back as 120 yards and challenging top riders Bob Sharp and Jim Airey for wins. Only a year after his first race he was the sole rider starting at the back of the field in handicap races (150 yards) with Sharp off 120 and Airey from 90.

In only his first start from the 150 mark, Guasco was forced to lay his bike down to avoid rider Bob Jameson who had fallen. Unfortunately for Guasco his laydown hardly slowed him and he slid into Jameson's bike and tumbled over it. He suffered a severely lacerated hand when it caught the bike's chain and also injured his leg. His injuries kept him out of the 1963 Australian Solo Championship, for which he was one of the favourites to win as it was held at the Sydney Showground.

After basing himself in England from 1964 to 1966, Guasco and his family returned to Australia in 1966, staying for just over two years before returning to England to ride in 1969. Other than continued success on track, Guasco's main achievement was to be convincing Frank Oliveri, the manager of the then new Liverpool Speedway in western Sydney, to add bikes to his racing programs.

=== England ===
Guasco, along with friend and fellow Australian rider Jim Airey were signed to race in England by Sunderland Saints promoter Mike Parker. After Sunderland were disbanded, both riders then transferred to the Wolverhampton Wolves where Guasco would stay until 1966 before he returned home to Australia for another two years.

In 1965 while riding for Wolverhampton, Guasco won through to the Intercontinental Final, which in the days before the Speedway Grand Prix was the last step before the World Final. In his best international result, Gordon Guasco missed out by a single point on qualifying for the World Final. In a run off for a reserve spot he was beaten by English rider Mike Broadbank.

After recapturing his form while back in Australia, Guasco negotiated for a return to England in 1969 with the Poole Pirates, who with "Horse" leading the way, were British League Champions in 1969. Poole failed to retain the title in 1970 and Guasco's own riding was considered more subdued than had been in 1969.

=== Grasstrack ===
During his time in the UK, Guasco also took part in a number of Grasstrack meetings. In 1966, he took part in the British Championship.

== Death ==
Guasco and his family returned to Sydney in 1970 to race in the Australian Speedway season, basing himself at the Liverpool Speedway. In a sad twist, Guasco, the man who had originally convinced management to run bikes at the speedway, was killed in a crash there on 8 November 1970. Guasco suffered severe head injuries after being struck from behind by another rider. He had laid his own bike down to avoid a fallen rider in front of him. For eight days, he lay unconscious in hospital before dying.

== Personal life ==
During the 1964-65 British winter, Guasco married Elaine Manshover and continued to work his trade as a signwriter. Together Gordon and Elaine have a daughter, Joely-Ann and Grandchildren Nicole, Matthew, Kieren and Kye who all now live on the Fraser Coast, QLD. Nicole and Matthew have recently become married to their partners.
