= Brian Collins (speedway rider) =

- Born: 13 May 1948; Edinburgh, Scotland
- Nationality: British (Scottish)

Career history
- 1966-1969, 1978-1980: Edinburgh/Coatbridge Monarchs
- 1970-1971: Wmbley Lions
- 1972-1973: Poole Pirates
- 1974-1977, 1984-1985: Coatbridge/Glasgow Tigers
- 1981-1983: Berwick Bandits

Individual honours
- 1975: National League Riders' runner-up
- 1975: Scottish Open Champion

Brian John Collins (born 13 May 1948 in Edinburgh, Scotland) is a former motorcycle speedway rider.

== Career ==
Collins spent the first four years of his British speedway career with Edinburgh Monarchs from 1966 to 1969, although they were known as Coatbridge from 1968 to 1969. In 1968, he top scored for Scotland against England in a test match.

In 1970 and 1971, Collins rode for Wembley after the London team bought the Coatbridge licence. In 1972 Wembley sent their entire team out on loan due to extra football fixtures stopping the speedway at Wembley and Collins moved to Poole Pirates for two years. He joined the Coatbridge/Glasgow Tigers in 1974 and won the Scottish Open Champion in 1975.

Also in 1975, Collins finished runner up in the 1975 The National League Riders Championship at Wimbledon. After two unbeaten rides, Collins came out against the only other unbeaten rider Paul Gachet. In their third heat, both Collins and Gachet were cut up before the first bend, Gachet's wheel being struck and, in holding his machine steady, the young Eagle found himself at the back. As he managed to pass Collins, his bike reared on the notorious second bend of Plough Lane and both he and Collins fell. Gachet was carried off and, in the re-run, Collins scored three points. Collins went out in the final heat needing only one point for a run-off and two for the crown. Lying second behind Les Rumsey, he fell on the third lap, remounted, but was too far behind to catch up. Then, Brian Clarke, in third place, fell off in the same spot and Collins went past him for the vital one point. With just two riders in the run-off Laurie Etheridge rode across Collins before the first bend and Collins picked himself up from the track and watched from the centre green as Etheridge completed four laps to become champion.

In 1978 and after spending three seasons with Glasgow, where he became the team captain, Collins returned to Edinburgh, which was his first club and rivals to Glasgow.

Collins rode the remainder of his career for Berwick Bandits and Glasgow again.
