= Grzegorz Szczepanik =

Polish speedway rider

- Born: 10 June 1953; Łańcut, Poland
- Nationality: Polish

Career history

Poland
- 1973-1975, 1977-1981: ROW Rybnik
- 1982: Kolejarz Opole

Great Britain
- 1976: Leicester Lions

Grzegorz Szczepanik (born 10 June 1953) is a Polish former motorcycle speedway rider.

== Career ==
Born in Rybnik, Szczepanik first rode in Poland in 1973 for the ROW Rybnik club.

After finishing eleventh in the Polish Junior Championship in 1974, Szczepanik signed for Leicester Lions in 1976, but after a season where he averaged below three points per match, he returned to Poland.

Szczepanik's last season in the Team Speedway Polish Championship was with Kolejarz Opole.
