= George Barclay (speedway rider) =

British speedway rider

- Born: 1 April 1935 (age 91); London, England
- Died: January 2026 - age 90.
- Nationality: British (English)

Career history
- 1967–1969: West Ham Hammers
- 1969: King's Lynn Starlets
- 1970: Rayleigh Rockets
- 1971–1974: Sunderland Stars/Gladiators
- 1973: Swindon Robins
- 1974: Rye House Rockets
- 1975: Crayford Kestrels

George A. Barclay (born 1 April 1935 in Elephant & Castle, London, England) is a former motorcycle speedway rider from England.

== Career ==
Barclay started his career with the West Ham Hammers in the British League, during the 1966 British League season. He left West Ham to sign for Rayleigh Rockets for the 1970 season.

Barclay joined the Sunderland Stars in 1971 and remained with them until their closure in 1974.

== After racing ==
Barclay has been the driving force of the opening of the National Speedway Museum in Broxbourne in Hertfordshire. It is believed Barclay passed away aged 90 in January 2026.
