= Crayford Kestrels =

Former British speedway team

- Crayford Kestrels Badge

Club information
- Track address: Crayford & Bexleyheath Stadium; Stadium Road; Crayford; Kent
- Country: England
- Founded: 1968
- Closed: 1983

Club facts
- Colours: Red, Black and Gold
- Track size: 242 metres (265 yd)

Major team honours
National League Fours Champions	1980

The Crayford Kestrels were a Speedway team which operated from 1968 until their closure in 1983. They were based at Crayford & Bexleyheath Stadium in Crayford.

== History ==
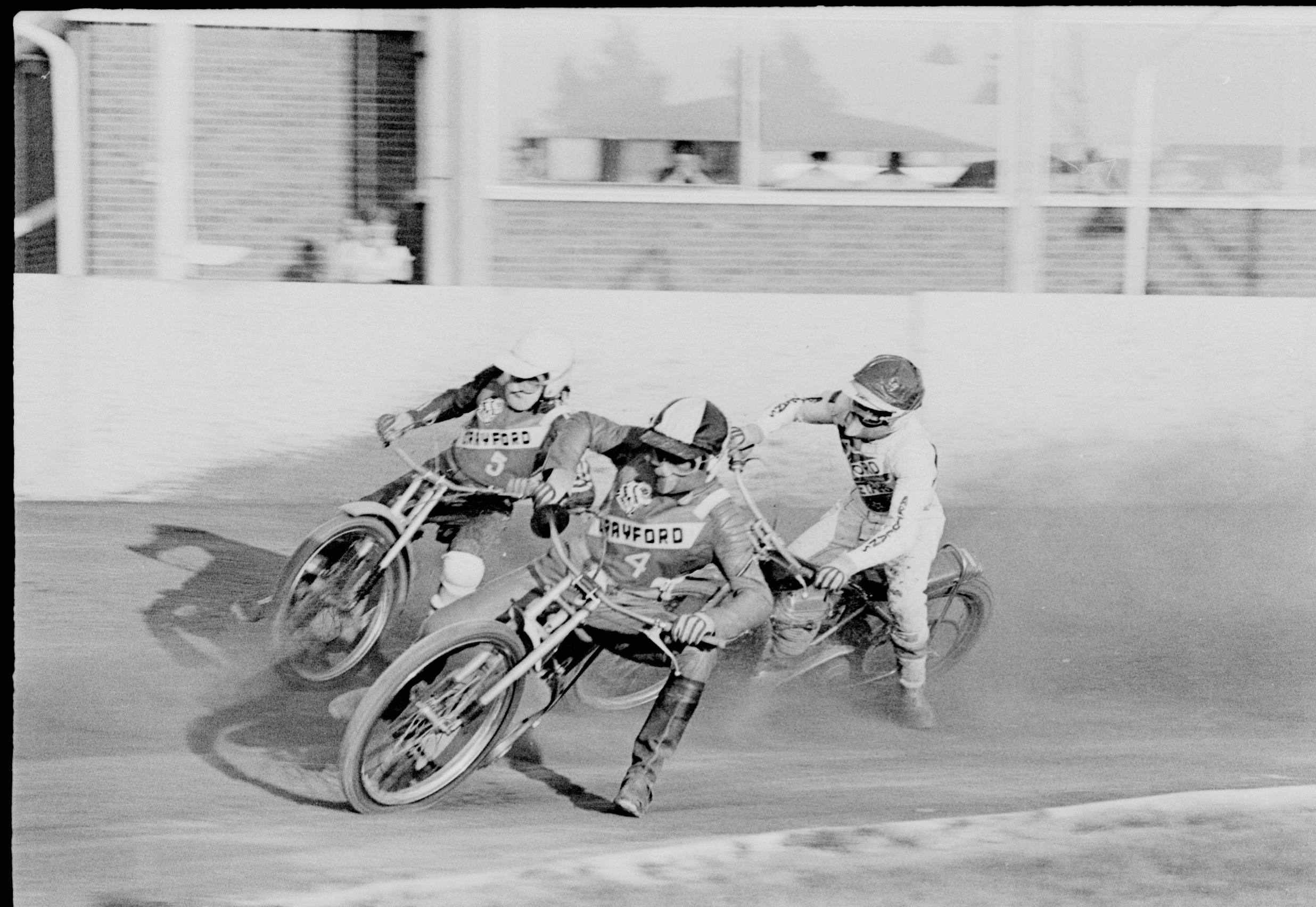
Crayford away at Oxford (1976)

Speedway meetings in Crayford were first held during 1935 and 1936 but soon ended and the sport would not return for over 30 years.

In 1967 a speedway circuit was constructed inside the greyhound track at the Crayford & Bexleyheath Stadium and promoter Johnnie Hoskins planned to bring the speedway team from Edinburgh to Crayford because Old Meadowbank had closed. However, the Edinburgh team moved to Coatbridge and Hoskins turned his attention to Canterbury. Bill Bridgett and Mike Parker of the Wolverhampton Wolves stepped in to promote the Crayford speedway Crayford were founder members of British League Division Two in 1968. The first signings were Mick Handley and Dave Parry (Wolves riders on loan) and the team finished in sixth place during its inaugural season.

The team known as the Crayford Highwaymen continued to race throughout the 1969 and 1970 seasons. Geoff Ambrose starred in 1969 when the team finished fourth in the league. However, after the 1970 season the team were disbanded with the promoters citing not being able to afford the new rider pay rates.

Speedway returned to the stadium in 1975 with a team nicknamed the Kestrels under the co-promotion of Peter Thorogood and Len Silver. The Kestrels would compete for nine years from 1975 to 1983.

The Kestrels won the Four-Team Championship, held at the East of England Arena on 27 July 1980; the team was Paul Woods, Les Rumsey, Steve Naylor, Alan Sage and Laurie Etheridge. However, arguably their most successful season was the third place finish during the 1983 National League season.

The team were forced to relocate for the 1984 season as the stadium was sold for redevelopment and for the 1984 season the team transferred the promotion to Hackney and ran a team called the Hackney Kestrels.

== Notable riders ==
- Geoff Ambrose
- Mick Handley
- Les Rumsey
- Barry Thomas
- Paul Woods

== Season summary ==
Year and league	Position	Notes
1968 British League Division Two season	6th	rode as the Highwaymen
1969 British League Division Two season	4th	rode as the Highwaymen
1970 British League Division Two season	14th	rode as the Highwaymen
1975 New National League season	8th	
1976 National League season	6th	
1977 National League season	10th	
1978 National League season	10th	
1979 National League season	12th	
1980 National League season	9th	Four-Team Championship winners
1981 National League season	10th	
1982 National League season	15th	
1983 National League season	3rd	

== See also ==
- Category:Crayford Kestrels riders
- List of defunct motorcycle speedway teams in the United Kingdom
