= Love Street (stadium) =

Former football stadium in Paisley, Scotland

St Mirren Park
- Love Street
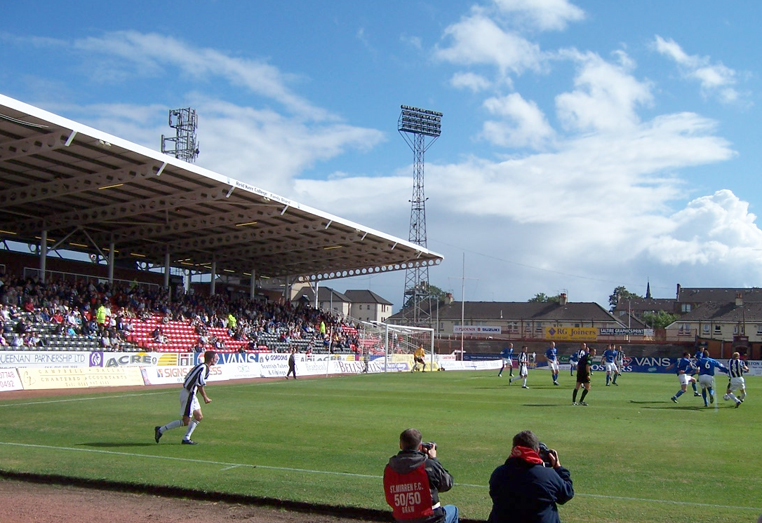

- Location in Renfrewshire
- Former names: Love Street Grounds; Greater Love Street Grounds
- Location: Paisley, Scotland
- Coordinates: 55°51′10″N 4°25′43″W
- Owner: St Mirren
- Capacity: 10,800
- Surface: Grass
- Field size: 110 x 70 yards

Construction
- Opened: 1894
- Expanded: 1921
- Closed: 2009

Tenants
- St Mirren F.C. (1894–2009); Morton F.C. (1949); Paisley Lions (1975–1976)

St Mirren Park, more commonly known as Love Street, was a football stadium located on Love Street in Paisley, Scotland. Until its closure in 2009, it was the home ground of St Mirren F.C.. At one time the stadium was capable of accommodating almost 50,000 spectators, but in its final years it had an all-seated capacity of 10,800.

The football grounds on Love Street were registered as Fullerton Park for St Mirren's first season there as they were originally rented from a Mr Fullerton. The ground's record attendance was 47,438 for a match against Celtic in 1949. St Mirren completed construction of their new St Mirren Park in December 2008. St Mirren played their last game at Love Street, against Motherwell, on 3 January 2009.

== Early years at Love Street ==
When St Mirren began to play on Love Street in the mid-1890s football clubs were still very much in their infancy and moved from ground to ground renting from local landowners. The best deal available was commonly a ten-year lease and by the time St Mirren arrived at Love Street, the club was only 17 years old and playing on its fifth rented ground. They had previously played on four sites in the north of Paisley; Shortroods Estate (1877 to 1878), Abingdon Park (1878 to 1879), Thistle Park, Greenhill Road (1879 to 1883), and Westmarch Estate, Greenhill Road (1883 to 1894). Paisley clubs Abercorn, who played at Underwood Park, and St Mirren joined the Scottish Football League when it started in 1890–91.

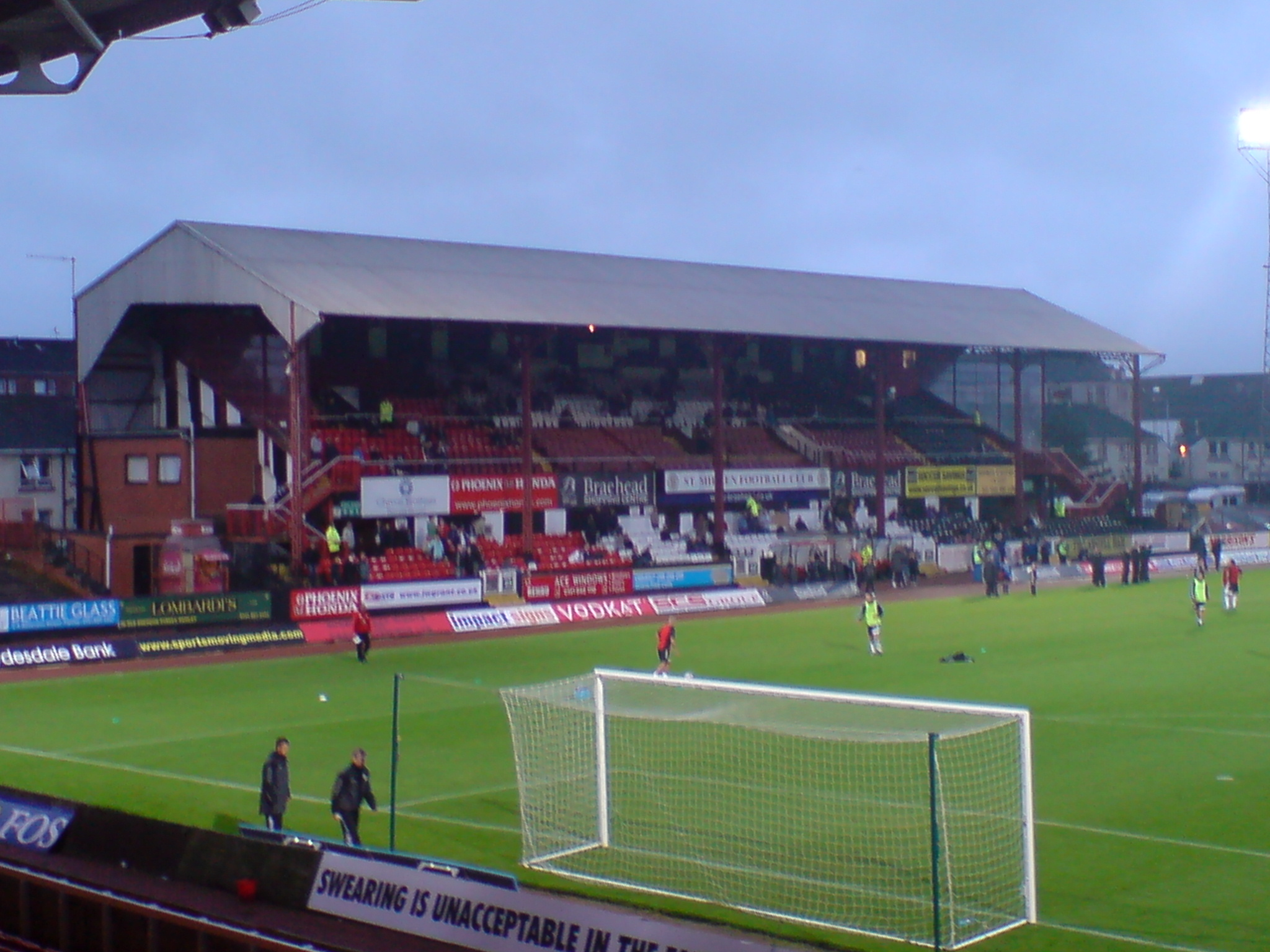
Old Main Stand

Following ten years playing at Westmarch, St Mirren moved in 1894 in response to a 100% rent increase by the landlord who appeared to have lost interest in hosting football on his land. The club found a former brickworks at the foot of Love Street which could be rented for an initial ten years on reasonable terms. The land at Westmarch had been laid out with two pitches, a grandstand and pavilion; the Love Street site was substantially smaller, barely wide enough to lay a football pitch with some spare ground behind the goals; it was poorly drained and without grass. However, it would give St Mirren the significant advantage of being nearer to Paisley town centre than any of the other football clubs in the town. Furthermore, the site was already well known to the townsfolk as an entertainment venue, as it was where travelling circuses set up their Big Top.

The original Love Street site housed the re-built club pavilion behind the Love Street end goal, and a new grandstand, squeezed along the full length of the pitch with five rows of seats and a total capacity of 1,000. St Mirren played their first home game at Love Street, a 3–0 defeat to Celtic, on 8 September 1894.

Shortly after the original ten-year lease ran out, the club was almost forced to move away from Love Street, much as it had already been from Westmarch. With the club approaching Mr Fullerton with an offer to buy the site, the landowner tried to take advantage of the situation by setting a lofty price, together with an ultimatum to either buy or face a hefty increase in rent. The club hastily looked for alternatives, and began negotiations with the owners of the Shortroods Estate where St Mirren had played for its first season. However, with the prospect of losing out altogether, Mr Fullerton backed down, reducing his asking price to £3,900 and thus Saints purchased and stayed at Love Street.

Over the course of the next fifteen years the club's aim was to expand the site by buying the land that bordered on two sides – towards the town and round onto Greenock Road. However, it was not until 1920 that the land was finally secured and St Mirren owned pretty much the site that it occupied through to its closure.

== Development of Love Street ==
With a large site now owned, and the football pitch about to be moved 40 yards towards the town, the club had plans in 1921 for a 60,000 capacity ground with a large oval sweep of earth embankments on three sides, with the fourth side taken up by a 4,500 seater grandstand set up above a 3,000 capacity terraced enclosure, with a 440-yard running track round the pitch. However, before building began, the Great Depression in the United Kingdom tightened its grip and costs more than doubled in the space of six months.

The part of the project to suffer most was the grandstand as the final price of the stadium rose from an estimate of £17,500, for the full plans, to around £30,000 for the scaled-down version that was completed six months later. The grandstand was reduced in size by almost two-thirds with the steel framework clad in corrugated sheeting to further reduce costs. The St Mirren Directors' intention was to eventually complete the original plans for a full-length grandstand on Love Street in stages as funds permitted, however this did not materialise.

After 1921 there were no major changes to the grounds until the late 1950s when the North Bank was covered and floodlights installed. Twenty years later new floodlight pylons were installed and plans appeared for redeveloping St Mirren Park as an all-seater stadium. There was also talk of incorporating airport car-parking, or a hotel, or commercial office space.

Love Street became a designated ground under the Safety of Sports Grounds Act in 1977, which prompted the local government to demand alterations. In the summer of 1979, the Love Street End terracing was knocked down and rebuilt ten yards from the goal. There was more talk of covering the new family enclosure at Cairter's Corner and installing a stadium clock and even one suggestion to re-locate in Renfrew (district) Council's proposed £200 million national stadium planned for a site across the railway line from Greenhill Road.

With the Scottish Football Association (SFA) preferring to redevelop Hampden Park, St Mirren remained at Love Street and seats were installed on the North Bank terrace in 1991. Four years later, after the owner of a large building company had joined the club's board of directors, the 3,015 seat Caledonia Stand was built in a deal that saw some of the club's land sold for development as housing. There were also plans to have a similar stand built at the Love Street End but the bottom fell out of the construction industry and there was the near closure of St Mirren in 1998.

St Mirren won the 1999–2000 Scottish First Division and were promoted to the Scottish Premier League (SPL) as First Division champions. In order to meet SPL regulations in their first season in the top flight, the club had to carry out further work on the stadium, installing seating on the Love Street terrace.

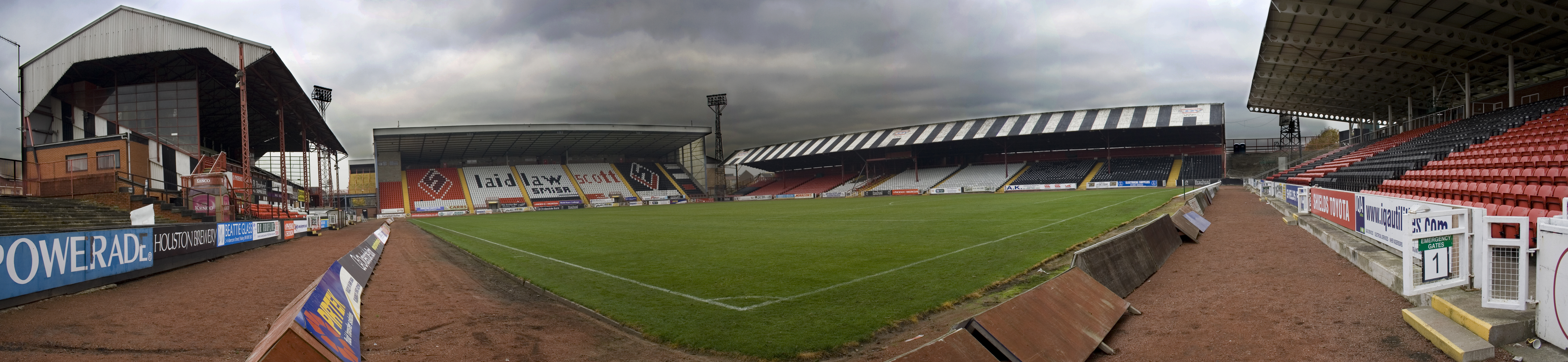
View from the old family end corner at Love Street

== The stands ==
At the time of the stadium closing, the 1921 main stand remained situated on the southern (town) side of the stadium. The largest stand was the West Stand (Caledonia Street), which housed away fans. The North Bank stand was sponsored by former shirt-sponsors LDV and was where the most vocal home fans usually sat. The most recently built stand, the East Stand, or Reid Kerr College Stand, was on the Love Street side of the stadium and became used as the home support's Family Stand .

== Floodlights ==
In the 1950s the club had a somewhat unique problem when it came to installing floodlights at Love Street. The ground was on the direct approach path for aircraft at near by Glasgow Airport which, at that time, was a mere three miles east, in Renfrew. This meant that as well as involving Paisley Town Council, Saints' plans also had to satisfy three Government departments - the Ministry of Civil Aviation, the Air Ministry and The Admiralty.

Initially there were roof-line lights set all the way along the newly built North Bank cover and the grandstand opposite. But, because the stand was considerably shorter than full-length there also had to be two pylons built to light the corners of the pitch on the stand side. And these could not be very tall because of the flight-path. They ended up therefore as two, strangely squat-looking, 40-foot pylons that weren't even as tall as the stand roof and had three rows of lights topped by a reflector shield.

These pylons had originally been used at either end of the covered terracing at Ibrox Park as Ibrox had the same issue being on the direct approach to Renfrew Airport from the east. These stunted floodlight pylons came to Love Street as part of the transfer negotiations that took central defender Willie Telfer to Rangers.

Nonetheless, there still came complaints from pilots that the pylon to the right of the stand was confusing their approach and a black-out order was imposed whilst aviation charts had this new landmark added. It then took a further eight months for the Air Ministry to run tests and finally pass the system fit for use. The first match under the floodlights was on 13 February 1959 against Peebles Rovers in the Scottish Cup, a match St Mirren won 10–0.

In 1966 the airport was moved to less than a mile north of St Mirren Park and its current site in Abbotsinch, Paisley; later becoming known as Glasgow Airport. Almost immediately the club was being asked by the media when they would install "proper" floodlights, as the system was not highly regarded. Club finances at the time were extremely tight, with only two full-time employees, and so there was no possibility that money could be spent on improving the floodlights.

It took until 1978, with a new set of Directors at the helm and a Development Fund put in motion that 90-foot high pylons were erected.

== Under-soil heating ==
One of the criteria for admittance to the SPL, following promotion in the 2005–06 season, was that the pitch was equipped with under-soil heating. As the club was already planning to move to a new site, it was faced with installing an expensive heating system that might only be used for one season, a financial burden they would struggle to meet. The Directors considered requesting a period of grace from the SPL, but in the end decided to go ahead with installing the system.

== Move to new stadium ==
On 16 August 2005 the Scottish Executive and Renfrewshire Council granted permission for the club to sell Love Street for supermarket development and allow the club to build a new stadium in Greenhill Road, Ferguslie Park, Paisley. The sale of their old ground financed the new stadium and cleared the financial debts of the club. In April 2007 it was announced that a deal had been struck with Tesco. Under this deal Tesco would pay for the construction of the new St Mirren Park, an 8,000-seat stadium. Work on the new ground started on 9 January 2008.

The last match to be played at Love Street, a goalless draw between St Mirren and Motherwell, took place before a sell-out crowd on 3 January 2009. The club officially moved into the new St Mirren Park on Wednesday 21 January 2009. The local authorities subsequently refused planning permission for a supermarket on the Love Street site. As of February 2012, it is planned to be used for housing.

== Attendance records ==
St Mirren played in five Scottish Cup semi-finals at home on the original Love Street Grounds. Crowds regularly reached 10,000 and peaked at 16,000 for the 1906 semi-final clash with Third Lanark. Following the ground's redevelopment, a visit of Rangers in the 1923–24 Scottish Cup took the ground attendance record above 40,000 for the first time and twelve months later Celtic came to Love Street and the attendance record rose to 47,428.

During the post-World War II boom in attendances, the record was broken again on 20 August 1949 with another visit by Celtic, this time in a Scottish League Cup match in front of a crowd of 47,438.

Once the Love Street End had been squared off, the capacity fell and the largest crowd was another visit of Celtic in the 1979–80 Scottish Cup fourth round replay when 27,166 squeezed inside, leaving huge queues on Love Street locked out.

At the time of closure, the all-seated capacity was 10,800. The highest attendance under that capacity was 10,261 for an SPL game against Dunfermline Athletic.

== Other football matches at Love Street ==
St Mirren hosted a women's football match at Love Street in 1895. The ground has been a regular venue for schoolboy internationals, Scottish Junior Cup semi-finals, and Scotland Under-21 internationals. In 1904 the Scottish Football League played the Irish Football League in front of 10,000 fans.

In 1923, 25,000 fans watched Scotland played Wales in the British Home Championship. Local rivals Morton played their home games at Love Street for part of 1949. The deal was that St Mirren got to keep the stand and enclosure takings from the games. Morton also played a Scottish Cup tie against Rangers at Love Street in 2000. In 1970, it was used as a venue for one match in the UEFA European Under-19 Football Championship hosted by Scotland.

=== International and other matches ===
- British Home Championship
  - Scotland 2, Wales 0, 17 March 1923. Attendance 25,000
- Inter-League International
  - Scottish Football League 3 Irish Football League 1, 7 February 1904. Attendance 10,000
- Under-23 International
  - Scotland 0 Northern Ireland 1, 28 April 1972.
- Under-21 Internationals
  - Scotland 2 Belgium 2, 18 November 1998. Attendance 5,087
  - Scotland 2 Bosnia and Herzegovina 0, 5 October 1999. Attendance 1,518
  - Scotland 1 Northern Ireland 1 6 September 2002. Attendance 2,351
- UEFA 23rd International Youth Tournament 1970
  - Bulgaria 3 Sweden 0, 18 May 1970
- Amateur International
  - Scotland 1 Wales 0, 29 February 1964
- 1995 UEFA Women's Championship qualification
  - Scotland 0 Belgium 3, 26 November 1995,
- Women's International
  - Scotland 0 England 4, 6 May 1990
- Scottish Challenge Cup Final
  - Hamilton Academical 3 Morton 2, 13 December 1992
- Scottish Junior Cup semi-finals
  - Pollok vs Tayport, 15 April 1996
  - Arthurlie vs Kilwinning Rangers, 30 April 1999
  - Johnstone Burgh vs Shotts Bob Accord, 5 May 2000
  - Renfrew vs Auchinleck Talbot, 6 April 2001
  - Renfrew vs Tayport, 12 April 2005
  - Arthurlie v Linlithgow Rose, 13 April 2007
- Schoolboy internationals
  - Under-16
    - Scotland 5 Northern Ireland 2, 1951
    - Scotland 1 Northern Ireland 0, 1963
    - Scotland 2 Northern Ireland 1, 1973
    - Scotland 0 England 1, 1984
    - Scotland 1 France 1, 1988
    - Scotland 1 Austria 0, 1999
    - Scotland 4 Switzerland 0, 2001
  - Under-17
    - Scotland 3 Switzerland 1, 1992
  - Under-18
    - Scotland 3 - 0 Wales 0, 1978
    - Scotland 2 England 1, 1981
    - Scotland 2 Republic of Ireland 4, 2003

== Other sports at Love Street ==
St Mirren was a Football and Athletic Club until 1905 and annual sports such as running and cycling events would have been a feature of the summer months. It is known that there was a Scottish Inter-Region rugby union match played there in 1897 and at least one dog handicap race run around the track in the early years of the 20th century.

St Mirren tried to introduce greyhound racing on a regular basis in the early 1930s, and spent money on upgrading the track. The first meeting was held on 14 October 1932 and the track was independent (unlicensed). However, only three weeks after the first race the SFA declared a ban on greyhound racing at football grounds and the club lost money on the venture. When the ban was lifted, and St Mirren was approached to resume racing, the club declined.

In 1938, a World Title Flyweight boxing match was scheduled to take place at the stadium involving Scotland's first-ever world champion boxer Benny Lynch. Again money was spent with an anticipated pay-back from a 30,000 crowd. The event turned sour when Lynch was stripped of his title in the days before the fight for failing by a large margin to make the weight. It went ahead as a non-title bout but Lynch's fans felt badly let down and the turnout was poor.

Paisley Lions speedway team raced in the British National Speedway League at Love Street for two seasons in 1975 and 1976. The first meeting was held on 5 April 1975 in front of a crowd of over 6,000. However, despite the meetings being well attended the club folded after two seasons. Their last meeting was held on 25 September 1976 when the Lions beat Boston Barracudas 52–25.

== See also ==
- Stadium relocations in Scottish football
