= John Wilson (speedway rider) =

Scottish speedway rider

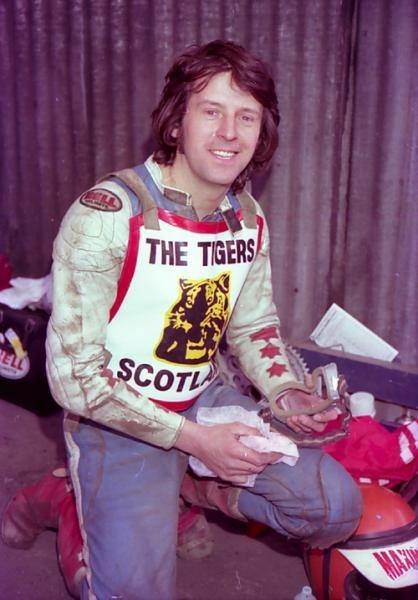
- Born: 22 October 1941; Glasgow, Scotland
- Nationality: British

Career history
- 1971: Sunderland Stars
- 1971-1973: Glasgow Tigers
- 1972: Barrow
- 1973: Berwick Bandits
- 1974-1976: Coatbridge Tigers

Individual honours
- 1975: Scottish Open Pairs Champion

John "Trapper" Wilson (born 22 October 1941 in Glasgow, Scotland) is a former motorcycle speedway rider.

== Biography ==
Wilson graduated to Speedway from Grasstrack racing. After some brief appearances with Sunderland Stars in 1971, he rode for the Glasgow Tigers speedway team from 1971 to 1977 (Relocated as Coatbridge Tigers from 1974)

Wilson appeared for the Scotland national team from 1973 through to 1975. In 1975, Wilson riding with Grahame Dawson, won the Scottish Open Pairs Championship.

Wilson also rode in four indoor Ice speedway events in Scotland during 1972 including the first event at Murrayfield riding for "Ayr Giants" against "Murrayfield" and the Scottish Open Pairs event in Aviemore, riding for Wembley Lions with partner Bert Harkins. Wilson rode three Long Track Speedway events at Motherwell finishing with a respectable eight points in the opening event.

== Post Speedway ==
Upon Wilson's retirement from his Speedway career, he has continued riding competitive off-road motorcycling in various forms including a return to grasstrack.
