= Geoff Ambrose =

British former motorcycle speedway rider

- Born: 26 July 1946 (age 80); Stoke-on-Trent, England
- Nationality: British (English)

Career history
- 1967–1971: Wolverhampton Wolves
- 1968–1969: Crayford Highwaymen
- 1972–1973: Leicester Lions
- 1973, 1975: Crewe Kings

Individual honours
- 1969: Second Division Riders Champion

Team honours
- 1972: Midland Cup

Geoffrey Ambrose (born 26 July 1946) is a former motorcycle speedway rider from England.

== Career ==
Born in Stoke-on-Trent, Ambrose began his career in 1967 with Wolverhampton Wolves, riding in two Division One matches. He stayed with Wolverhampton until the end of the 1971 season, also riding in Division Two for Crayford Highwaymen in 1968 and 1969.

Ambrose's best year was 1969, averaging over ten points per match for Crayford and over 6 for Wolverhampton, also winning the British League Division Two Riders Championship, held at Hackney Wick Stadium on 26 September. He represented a Young England side against Australasia and Czechoslovakia in 1969, and again in 1973, against Sweden.

In 1972, Ambrose moved on to Leicester Lions, and scored well until a series of knee injuries prompted his retirement from the sport. In 1973, he returned to racing with Crewe Kings in Division Two, also making four appearances for Leicester.

Ambrose retired early in the 1975 season to concentrate on his motorcycle dealership business in Crewe.

== Other pursuits ==
Ambrose was also a musician, and played in a band.
