= Chris Robins =

British former motorcycle speedway rider (born 1954)

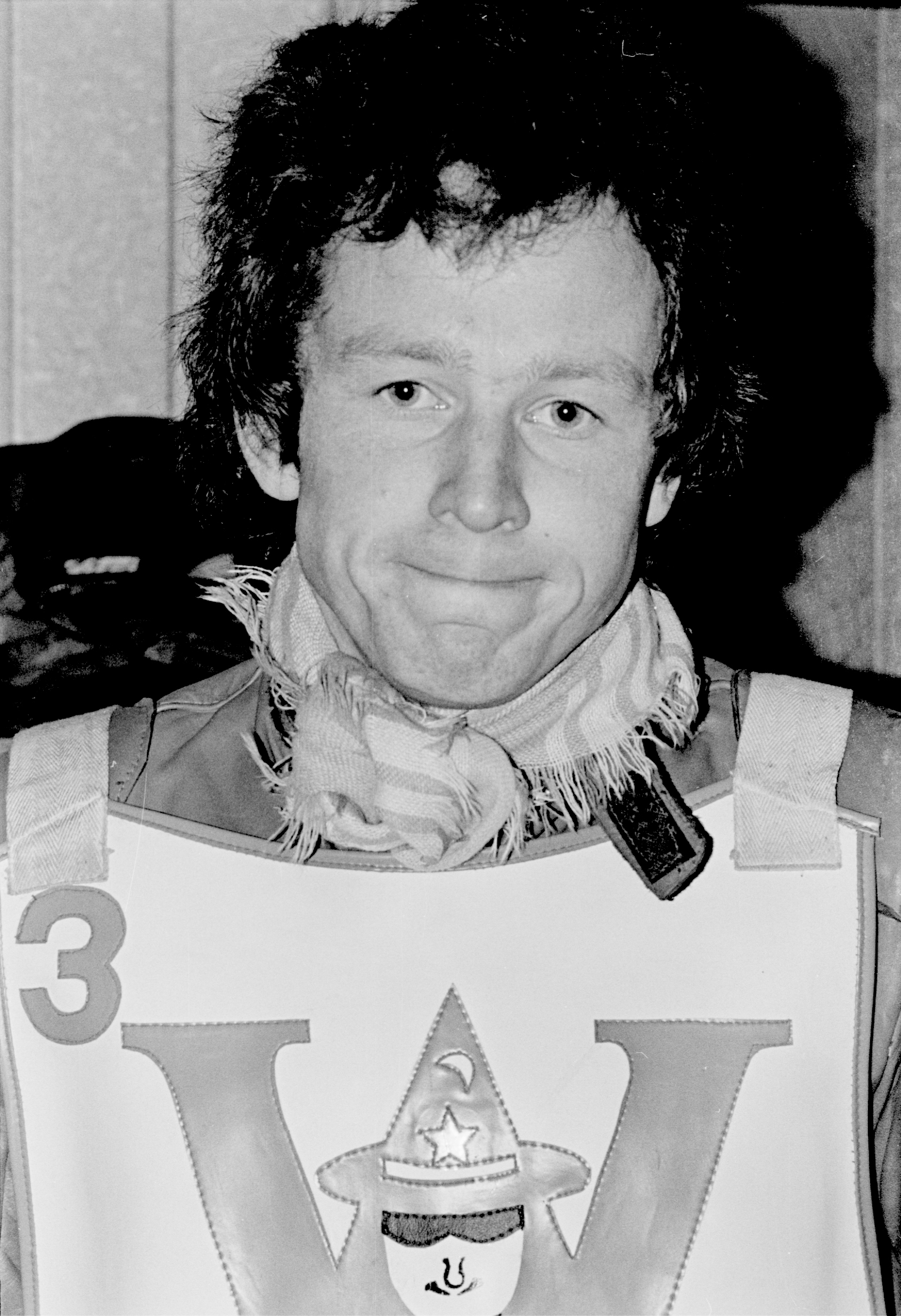
- Born: 2 January 1954 (age 72); Newton Abbott, Devon, England
- Nationality: British (English)

Career history
- 1975-1977: Weymouth Wizards
- 1977: Leicester Lions
- 1977: Newport Dragons
- 1978: Workington Comets
- 1978: Furness Flyers
- 1978-1980: Milton Keynes Knights

Christopher Michael Robins (born 2 January 1954) is a British former motorcycle speedway rider.

== Career ==
Born in Newton Abbott, Devon, Robins was a boxer as a schoolboy, and competed in the English Schoolboy Championships.

Robins took up speedway in late 1974, gaining his early experience riding on a beach near Barnstaple, and after riding in second half heats at Exeter, rode for Weymouth Wizards in the National League in 1975, averaging over five points in his first season.

In 1976, Robins averaged over seven for Weymouth, which led to a transfer in 1977 to British League Leicester Lions, also riding in the National League on loan to Newport Dragons.

After speculation that he would join Scunthorpe in 1978, Robins moved on to Workington Comets and then Furness Flyers before riding for Milton Keynes Knights. He retired in 1980 after only one match for the Knights.
