= Bob Cooper (speedway rider) =

British former motorcycle speedway rider

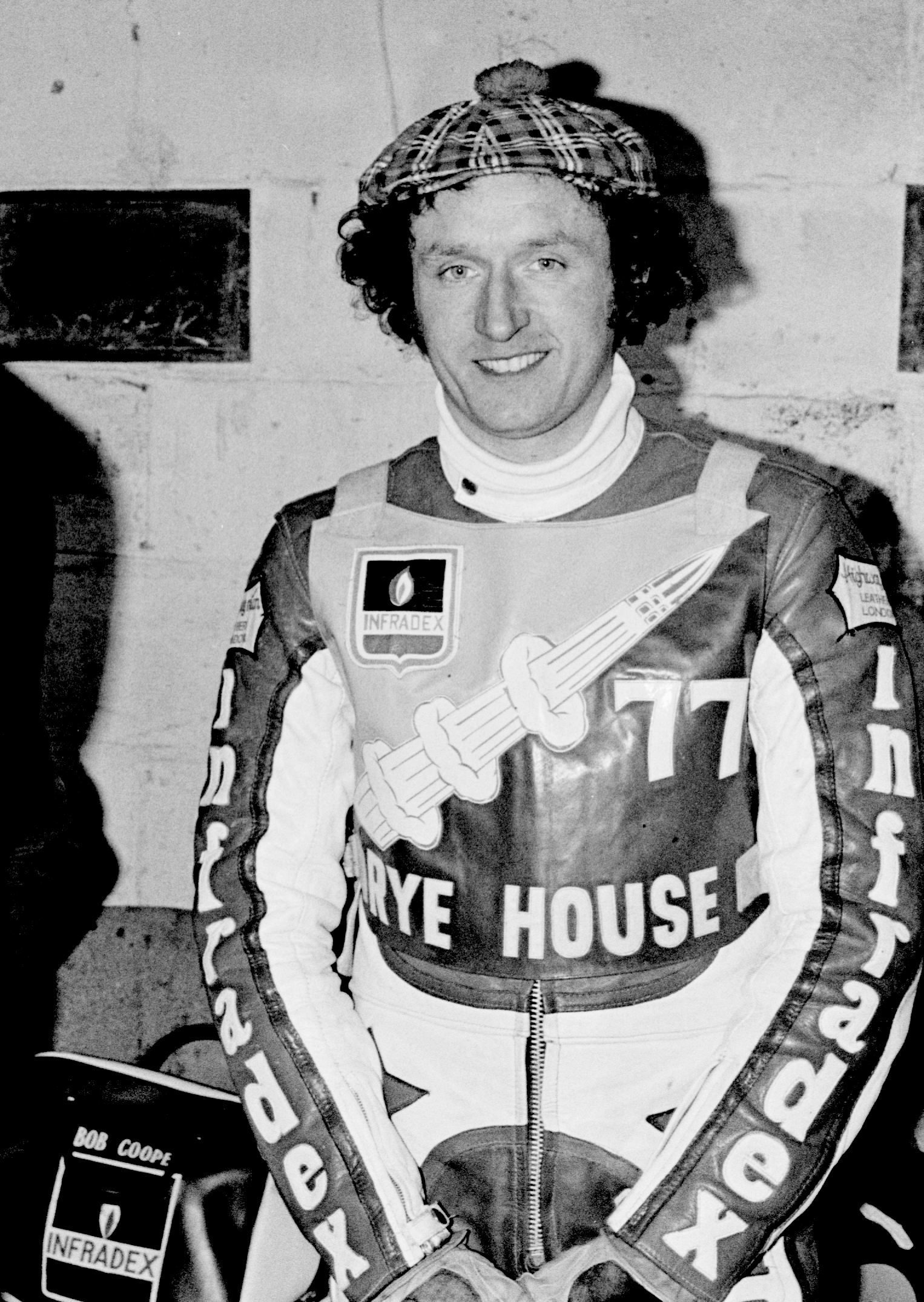
- Born: 23 June 1950 (age 76); Rugby, Warwickshire, England
- Nationality: British (English)

Career history
- 1974–1978: Rye House Rockets
- 1974–1975: Leicester Lions

Robert Charles Cooper (born 23 June 1950) is a British former motorcycle speedway rider who rode for Leicester Lions and Rye House Rockets.

== Career ==
Born in Rugby, Warwickshire, Cooper represented Central Midland Schools at cross-country running as a teenager. He combined his speedway career with his work as an engine fitter for Rolls-Royce.

After attending a training school at King's Lynn in 1971, Cooper made his competitive debut the following year in a 'Stars of Tomorrow' event at King's Lynn in 1972. In 1974, he signed for Leicester Lions, riding in the junior team, and was loaned out to Rye House Rockets, averaging 4.78 over his debut season, also riding in one match in the top division for Lions, but failing to score from three rides. He continued to ride for Rye House until 1978 and made two further appearances for Leicester in 1975. He made 128 appearances for Rye House, scoring 628 points.
