= Laurie Etheridge =

British motorcycle speedway rider

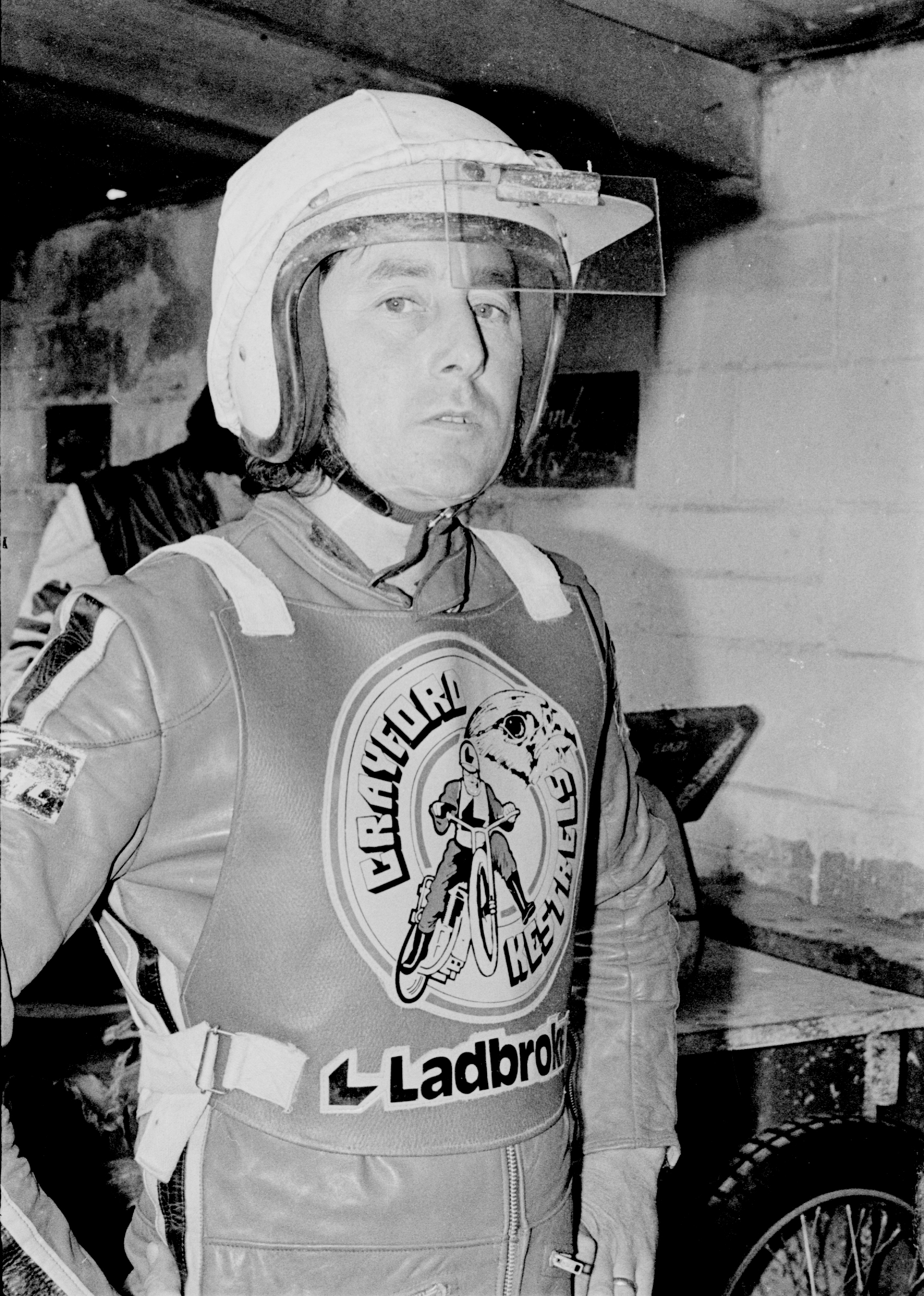
- Born: 12 September 1948 (age 78); Pulborough, England
- Nationality: British (English)

Career history
- 1967: Exeter Falcons
- 1968–1969: Rayleigh Rockets
- 1968–1980: Hackney Hawks
- 1975–1982: Crayford Kestrels
- 1979: Sheffield Tigers
- 1980–1981: Coventry Bees
- 1983: Canterbury Crusaders

Individual honours
- 1975: New National League Riders Champion

Team honours
- 1971: British League KO Cup Winner
- 1971, 1973: London Cup
- 1980: National League Fours Champion

Laurie Etheridge (born 12 September 1948 in Pulborough, England) is a former international motorcycle speedway rider from England. He earned one international cap for the England national speedway team.

== Career ==
Etheridge's first attempt at speedway, in 1963, was thwarted when his bike was stolen and he did not resume the sport until 1966.

In 1967, Etheridge signed for Exeter Falcons and managed three appearances for them in that season. His career really started the following year, when he was signed up for Hackney Hawks by Len Silver and their partner team Rayleigh Rockets. A good season for Rayleigh resulted in a full-time contract for Hackney.

Etheridge was a Crayford Kestrels regular for eight years from 1975, achieving nearly 300 league and cup appearances as a Kestrel. Crayford held a testimonial season for Etheridge in 1982.

In the 1975 National League Riders' Championship at Wimbledon on 27 September, Etheridge and Brian Collins both finished on 13 points but in the run-off for the title, Collins fell off in the first lap and Etheridge rode a solitary four laps to be crowned champion.

Etheridge was in the side when Crayford won their only trophy during the 1980 National League season. The Crayford team became the Fours Champions during the 1980 National League Four-Team Championship, however due to machine troubles, Etheridge didn't start a race in the final of the tournament.

Etheridge's last race was at Newcastle for Canterbury in 1983.

Notable performances:

- England v Russia (1974)
- National League Riders Champion (1975)
- National League series GB v Denmark (1978) – there was also a series against Australia
- National League Four Team Tournament (1980)
- Testimonial Year Crayford Kestrels v England (1982)

== Retirement ==
Post-speedway, Etheridge worked in industrial plumbing and central heating. He lives in West Sussex with his wife, Denise, and they have two married daughters and four grandchildren.
