= Lou Sansom =

Australian speedway rider

- Born: 29 November 1946 (age 79); Australia
- Nationality: Australian

Career history
- 1970–1973, 1975–1976: Workington Comets
- 1975: Hull Vikings
- 1976–1977: Birmingham Brummies

Individual honours
- 1973: British League Div 2 Leading average
- 1973: National League Riders' runner-up

Louis William Sansom (born 29 November 1946) is an Australian former international speedway rider.

== Speedway career ==
Sansom was capped by Australia and rode in the top two tiers of British Speedway from 1970 to 1977, riding for various clubs.

Sansom joined Workington Comets in 1970 and in 1973, he topped the league averages while riding for Workington Comets with a 10.56 average.

Sansom helped run the training schools at the Aspatria Speedway during the early 1970s.
