= Les Rumsey =

British speedway rider (1955–2026)

- Born: 27 July 1955; Canterbury, Kent, England
- Died: 27 February 2026 (aged 70)
- Nationality: British (English)

Career history
- 1972–1978, 1982–1983: Canterbury Crusaders
- 1975–1976, 1978: Exeter Falcons
- 1979: Cradley Heathens
- 1979: Oxford Cheetahs
- 1980: Crayford Kestrels
- 1980: Eastbourne Eagles
- 1981: Wolverhampton Wolves
- 1981–1982: Weymouth Wildcats
- 1981: Birmingham Brummies

Team honours
- 1978: National League Champion
- 1980: National League Fours Champion
- 1978: Spring Gold Cup

Leslie John Rumsey (27 July 1955 — 27 February 2026) was an English speedway rider.

== Biography ==
Rumsey rode in the top two tiers of British Speedway from 1972 to 1983, riding for various clubs. Rumsey signed for Canterbury Crusaders in 1972 and would spend seven years at the club becoming the club captain. In 1975, he finished in the top five averages during the 1975 New National League season. He then began to consistently ride as a heat leader for teams and was regarded as one of the National League's leading riders.

After the 1976 season, Rumsey stalled on signing the new contract offered by Wally Mawdsley because he was uncertain about his future in speedway but eventually decided to continue racing.

Rumsey scored a 10+ average for Canterbury in 1978, a 9.92 average for Oxford in 1979 and a 10.19 average in 1981 for Weymouth.

In 1980, Rumsey helped the Crayford Kestrels win the Fours Championship during the 1980 National League season.

In 1982, Rumsey returned to his first club Canterbury and finished his career with them after the 1983 season.

Rumsey died on 27 February 2026, at the age of 70.
