= Steve Holden (speedway rider) =

British speedway rider

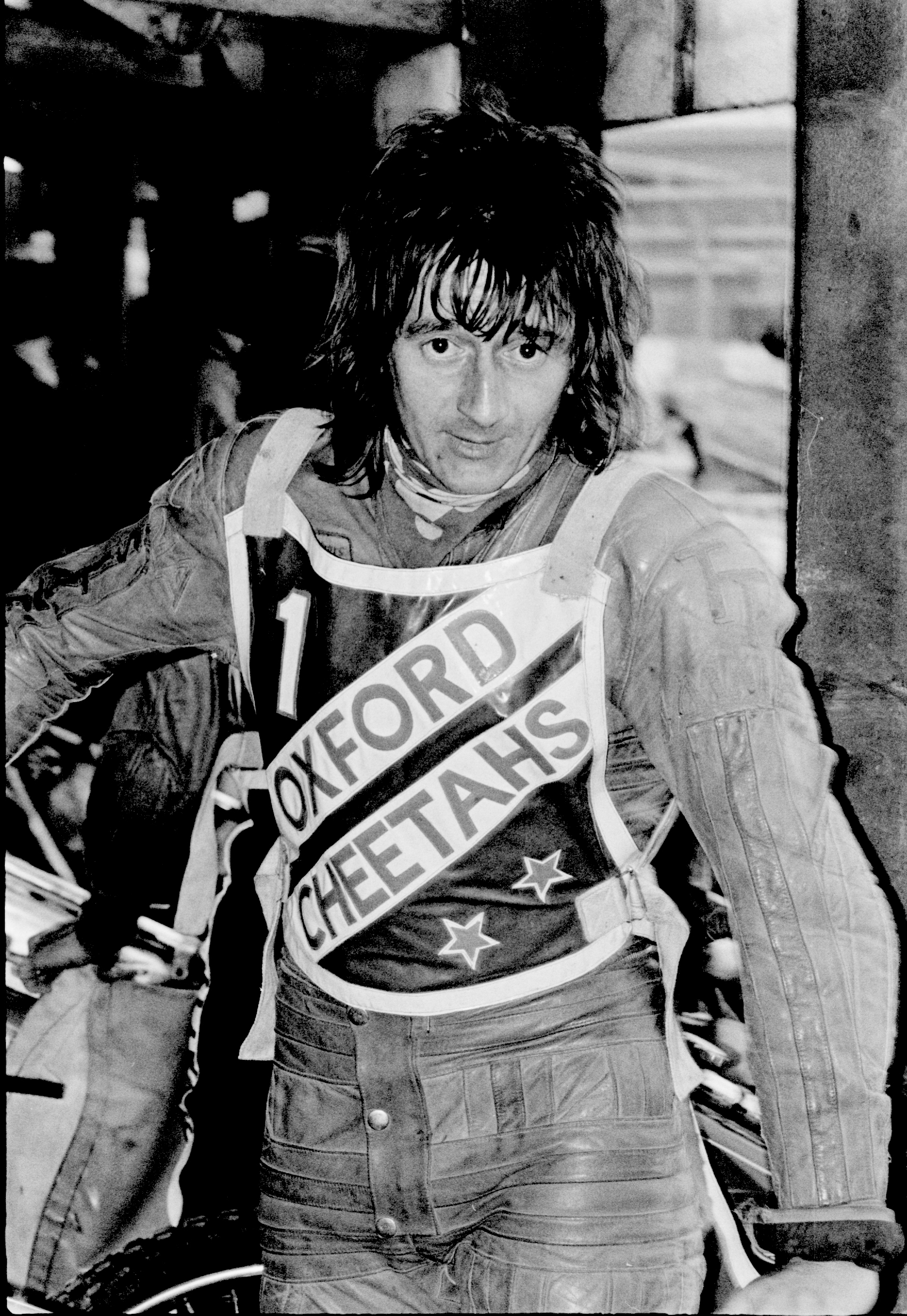
- Born: 12 December 1952; Liverpool, England
- Died: 13 December 2014 (aged 62)
- Nationality: British (English)

Career history
- 1973–1975: Chesterton/Stoke Potters
- 1975: Cradley Heathens
- 1976: Oxford Cheetahs

Steve Holden (12 December 1952 in Liverpool – 13 December 2014) was a motorcycle speedway rider from England.

== Career ==
Holden started his speedway career at Loomer Road Stadium, where for one season only, he rode for Chesterton Potters, riding in six meetings during the 1973 British League Division Two season and averaging 5.40 for the season.

Gaining a regular team place with Stoke Potters in 1974, Holden rode in 35 meetings, raising his average to 5.87. he continued to ride for Stoke during the 1975 New National League season despite initially agreeing to ride for Peterborough Panthers on loan. Over 14 meetings for Stoke and having 50 rides, he raised his points average to 7.92. He had two meetings for Cradley Heathens where he managed 5 rides.

Harry Bastable brought Holden to Oxford Cheetahs in their first year of National League in 1976. Steve became a crowd favourite, not just by riding but by living locally and getting involved off-track, such as dee-jaying at the Supporters Club, and, in Easter 1976, taking chocolate eggs to the children's ward of the John Radcliffe Hospital. With Cliff Anderson, he worked on track maintenance, looking after safety features such as boarding up the wire fencing, which had to be put up and taken down at every meeting so as not to obscure the view of the greyhound track on their race nights.

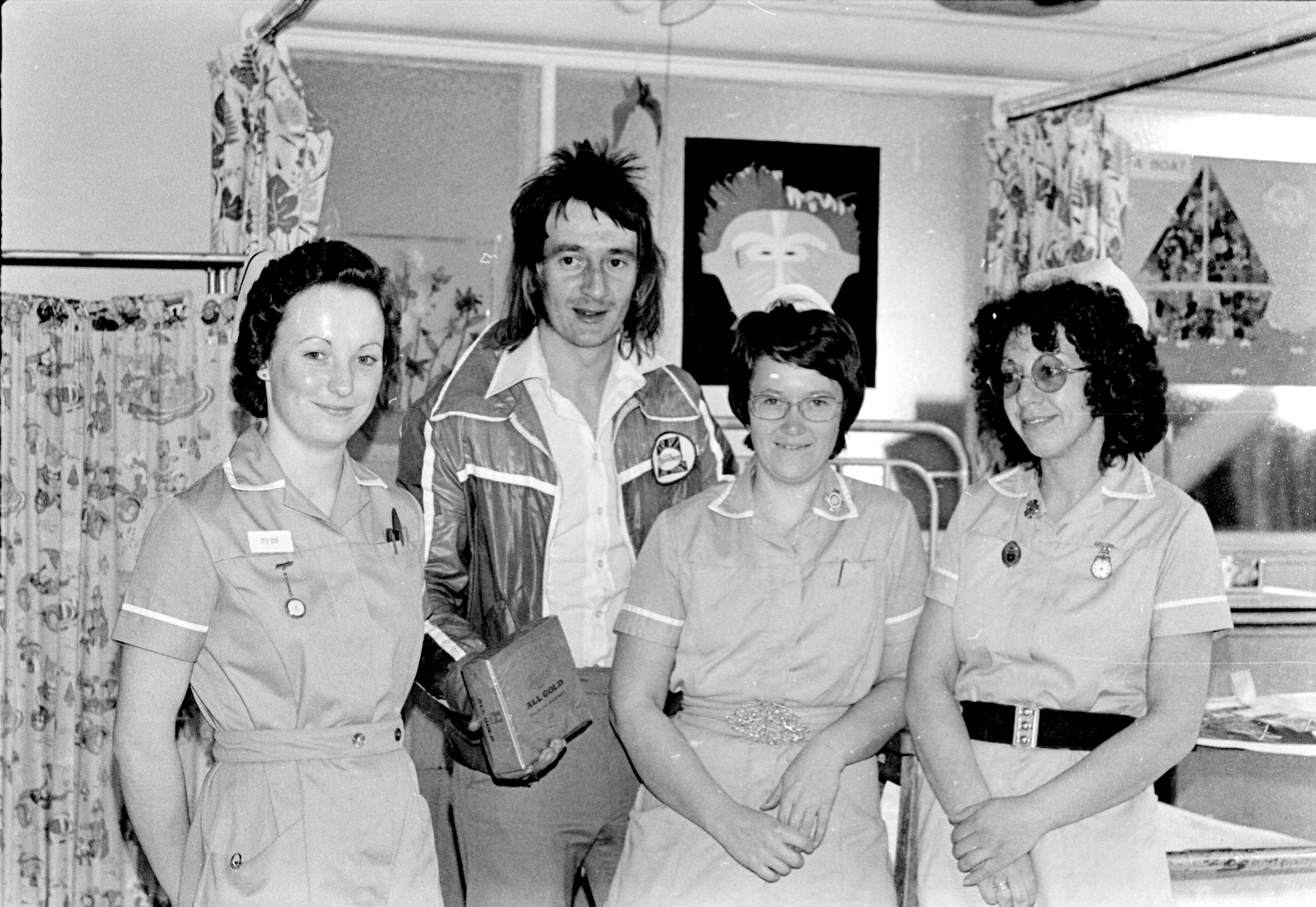
1976 Easter visit to Children's Ward

Before speedway, Holden had been a Private in the Royal Corps of Signals, following an apprenticeship as a Hydraulic Fitter.

Holden lived in Wolverhampton with his family until his death in hospital in the early hours of 13 December 2014.
