= Brian Foote =

British former motorcycle speedway rider

- Born: 29 December 1948 (age 77); Mitcham, England
- Nationality: British (English)

Career history
- 1968: Middlesbrough Teessiders
- 1969: Canterbury Crusaders
- 1969-1971: Romford Bombers
- 1970: Wembley Lions
- 1972: West Ham Bombers
- 1972-1973: Rayleigh Rockets
- 1972-1973: Leicester Lions
- 1974-1976: Rye House Rockets

Brian Allen Foote (born 29 December 1948) is a former motorcycle speedway rider from England.

== Career ==
Born in Mitcham, Foote's first experience of speedway was at Long Eaton in 1967, going on to ride in second half races at Leicester Lions in 1968, where his uncle Ron Wilson was the promoter. After a few appearances for Middlesbrough Teessiders in 1968, he rode for Canterbury Crusaders and Romford Bombers in 1969. He stayed with Romford in 1970 and also made his debut in the first division of the British League with Wembley Lions, averaging a respectable 4.8 points from two meetings.

Foote made his first appearance for the second division representative 'Young England' team in 1970, against Czechoslovakia, going on to further appearances in 1972. In 1971, he further improved for Romford, averaging eight points per match in the second division. Progress in 1972 for West Ham Bombers and Rayleigh Rockets saw him get further division one opportunities for Leicester Lions and Ipswich Witches, and in 1973, he rode in 21 league matches for Leicester, averaging just over three points.

Foote continued to score highly in the second division (later named the National League) for Rye House Rockets (where he also became club captain) until his retirement in 1976.
