= John Hart (speedway rider) =

British former motorcycle speedway rider (born 1941)

- Born: 22 January 1941 (age 85); Birmingham, England
- Nationality: British (English)

Career history
- 1960: Stoke Potters
- 1961-1966, 1971-1972: Cradley Heathens
- 1966-1967: Sheffield Tigers
- 1968-1970: Leicester Lions
- 1973-1975: Birmingham Brummies

Team honours
- 1961, 1963: Provincial League KO Cup Winner
- 1963: Provincial Midland League Winner
- 1974: British League Division Two Champion
- 1974: British League Division Two KO Cup Winner
- 1975: New National League Champion

John Philip Hart (born 22 January 1941) is a former motorcycle speedway rider from England.

== Career ==
Born in Birmingham, John Hart is the son of former rider and Birmingham promoter Tiger Hart. After initially racing stock cars from 1959, he began his speedway career in 1960 with Stoke Potters. Hart was the last to ride on Birmingham's Perry Barr track (at the Alexander Sports Stadium) before it closed to speedway in 1960.

Hart moved to Cradley Heathens in 1961, the team that he would ride for in eight seasons over the course of his career. In 1962 he represented England against an Overseas team, and also represented a Provincial League select against the National League. When the British League started in 1965, Hart was a heat leader with the Heathens, averaging close to eight points per match. In 1966 he transferred to Sheffield Tigers, where he spent two seasons before moving to Leicester Lions for three seasons in which he only missed one match.

In 1971, Hart returned to Cradley, but failed to repeat his earlier form over two seasons there and in 1973 dropped down to the Second Division with Birmingham Brummies, where was a consistent high scorer for three seasons before retiring in 1975.

Towards the end of his speedway career, Hart became a partner in the Compleat Angler public house at Wirksworth, Derbyshire.
