= Sunderland Stars =

British motorcycle speedway team

- Sunderland Stars Speedway Badge

Club information
- Track address: Sunderland Greyhound Stadium; Newcastle Road; East Boldon; Durham
- Country: England
- Founded: 1971
- Closed: 1974

Club facts
- Colours: Red, white and gold
- Track size: 310 yards (280 m)

The Sunderland Stars were a motorcycle speedway team who raced at the Sunderland Greyhound Stadium from 1971 until 1974 in the British League Division Two.

== History ==
Speedway arrived in Sunderland for the 1964 Provincial Speedway League season under the promotion of Mike Parker. The team was operational at the venue for part of one season only, when eight meetings were staged in 1964 under the "Saints" nickname. The Saints introduced Aussies Jim Airey and Gordon Guasco to British Speedway during 1964.

In 1971, Len Silver acting as promoter on behalf of Allied Presentations Ltd brought speedway back to Sunderland. The Stars competed in the 1971 British League Division Two season but finished 17th out of 17. This was followed by two seasons with 12th and 11th place finishes.

In 1974, the club came under the ownership of the Felton Speedway Promotions, set up by Mr & Mrs Fell and Alan Chorlton. The team nickname was changed from the Stars to the "Gladiators". It was also their final season before closure. In November 1974, Ian Thomas bought the defunct Sunderland licence and transferred it to re-form the Newcastle Diamonds.

== Season summary ==
Year and league	Position	Notes
1964 Provincial Speedway League	N/A	Saints, withdrew results expunged
1971 British League Division Two season	17th	Stars
1972 British League Division Two season	12th	Stars
1973 British League Division Two season	11th	Stars
1974 British League Division Two season	18th	Gladiators

== Notable riders ==
- (Australia) Jim Airey
- (England) George Barclay
- (England) Russ Dent
- (Australia) Gordon Guasco
- (England) Brian Havelock
- (England) Vic Harding
- (England) Jack Millen
