= Paul Gachet (speedway rider) =

British motorcycle racer (born 1955)

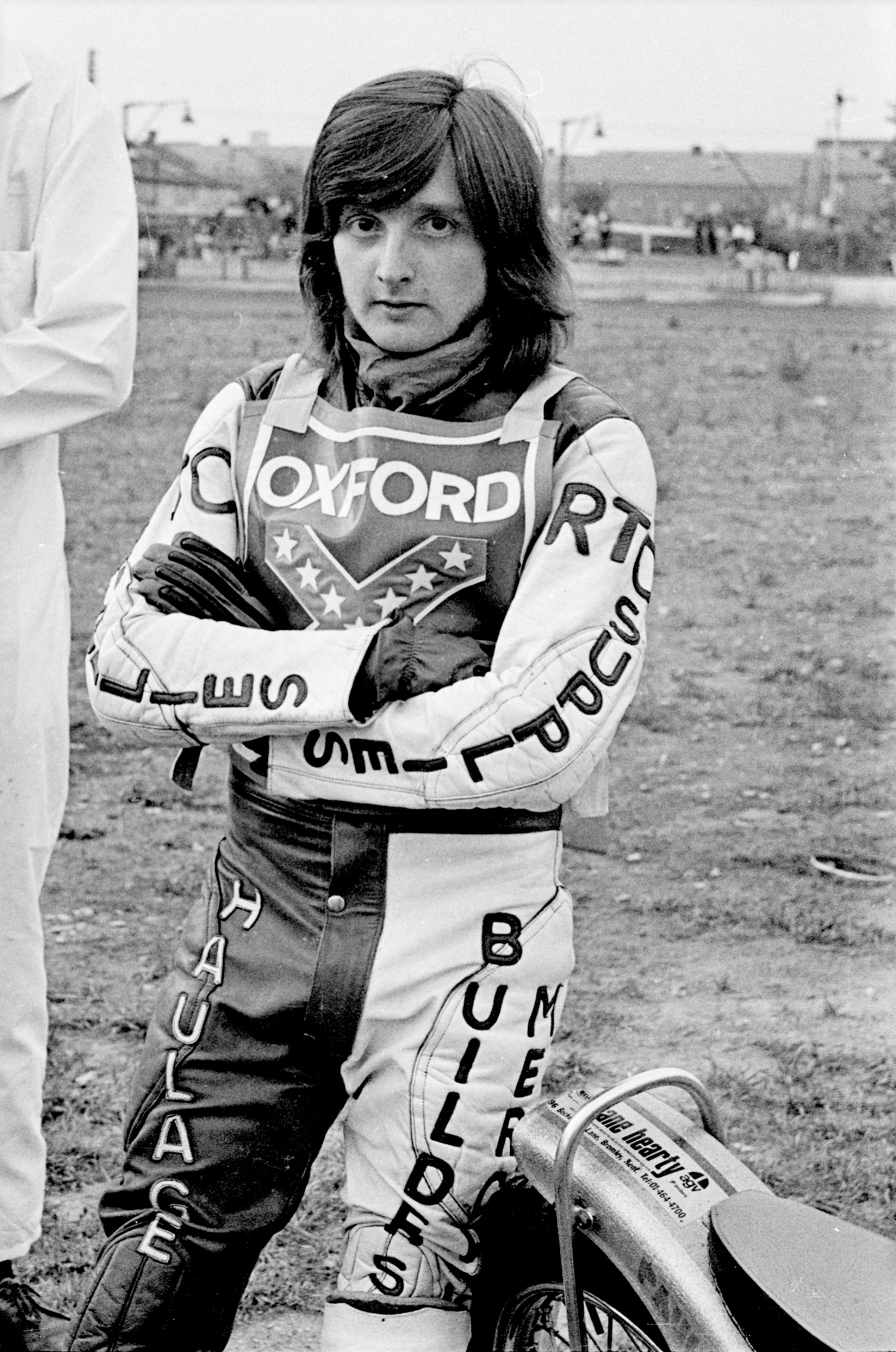
- Riding for Oxford Rebels
- Born: 23 April 1955; London
- Nationality: British

Career history
- 1972-1975: Eastbourne Eagles
- 1972-1975: Oxford Rebels
- 1973: Newport
- 1974: Wolverhampton Wolves
- 1976-1978: White City Rebels
- 1978: Mildenhall Fen Tigers

Team honours
- 1975: New National League KO Cup Winner
- 1975: Midland Cup Winner

Victor Paul Gachet (born 23 April 1955 in London) is a former motorcycle speedway rider from England.

== Career ==
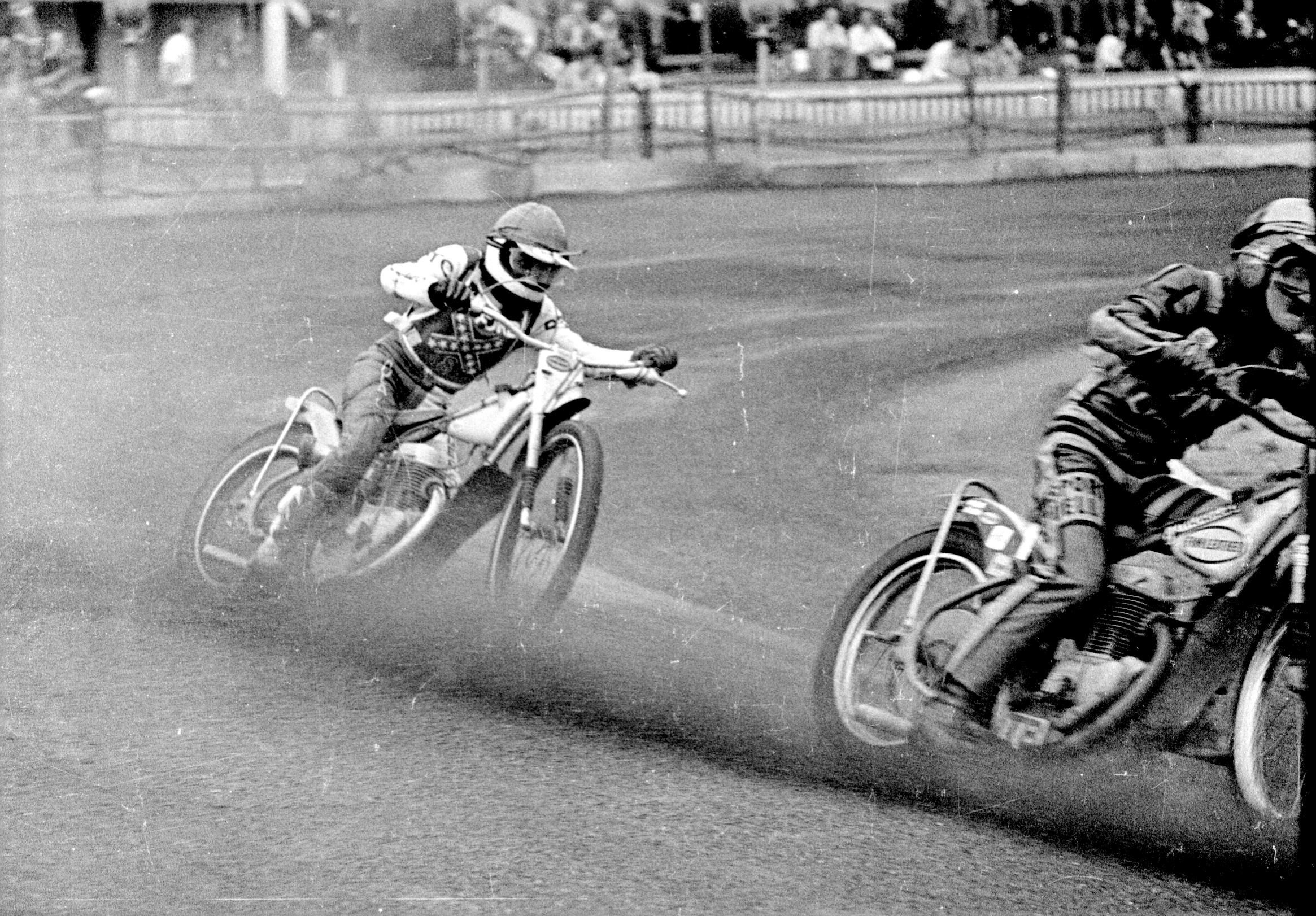
Riding for Oxford Rebels

Gachet started his career with Eastbourne Eagles in 1972 under promoter Bob Dugard and proceeded to spend four seasons with the club. In 1975, Gachet rode in the British League for the Oxford Rebels, again under co-promoter Bob Dugard.

In 1976, after threat of closure at Oxford, the team relocated to White City Stadium, where league speedway returned to White City for the first time since 1929. Gachet who worked at the stadium at the time, rode for the White City Rebels for three seasons.

For his last year in speedway, Gachet moved for his last year of racing to Mildenhall Fen Tigers.
