= 1979 British League season =

British speedway season

- League: British League
- No. of competitors: 18
- Champions: Coventry Bees
- Knockout Cup: Cradley Heath Heathens
- Individual: John Louis
- Gold Cup: Wimbledon Dons
- Midland Cup: Coventry Bees
- Northern League: Sheffield Tigers
- London Cup: Hackney Hawks
- Highest average: Scott Autrey
- Division/s below: 1979 National League

The 1979 Gulf British League season was the 45th season of the top tier of motorcycle speedway in the United Kingdom and the 15th season known as the British League.

== Summary ==
The league was sponsored by Gulf Oil for a fifth season. It comprised 18 teams - one fewer than the previous season. White City Rebels had folded and their riders became Eastbourne Eagles assets as Eastbourne were promoted from the National League. Bristol Bulldogs also dropped out after only two seasons back in the top flight.

Coventry Bees won the league for the second year running. Hull Vikings' second place was their best ever finish. The Coventry Bees team was similar to the previous season with a young 18 year-old Danish newcomer Tommy Knudsen replacing Jiří Štancl from the previous season. Alan Molyneux once again backed up the Coventry overseas contingent with a solid average. Cradley Heath won the Knockout Cup mainly thanks to their USA superstar Bruce Penhall. The Cradley team also had their own young Danish newcomer in 20 year-old Erik Gundersen and 20 year-old Hans Nielsen posted a 10 plus average for the season riding for Wolves. The future looked extremely bright for Denmark.

During the new British League Fours tournament a horrific accident took place at Hackney Wick Stadium on Friday 8 June. In the final heat between Hackney and Eastbourne all four riders were competing when Hackney's Vic Harding and Eastbourne's Steve Weatherley touched and their bikes became locked together. They were both thrown from their bikes into the fence and the metal post supporting one of the track lights. Both riders were taken to hospital but Harding died later that night and Weatherley was left paralysed. Further bad news filtered though in December after the season had finished, when Poole Pirate's Christer Sjösten died following serious injuries sustained in a race in Australia.

== Final table ==
Pos	Team	PL	W	D	L	Pts
1	Coventry Bees	34	26	0	8	52
2	Hull Vikings	34	24	2	8	50
3	Cradley Heath Heathens	34	24	0	10	48
4	King's Lynn Stars	34	22	1	11	45
5	Exeter Falcons	33	20	0	13	40
6	Halifax Dukes	34	18	0	16	36
7	Reading Racers	34	17	0	17	34
8	Swindon Robins	33	15	3	15	33
9	Wimbledon Dons	34	16	1	17	33
10	Belle Vue Aces	34	14	4	16	32
11	Wolverhampton Wolves	34	15	1	18	31
12	Poole Pirates	34	14	3	17	31
13	Sheffield Tigers	34	14	2	18	30
14	Birmingham Brummies	34	13	2	19	28
15	Ipswich Witches	34	12	2	20	26
16	Eastbourne Eagles	34	10	2	22	22
17	Leicester Lions	34	10	0	24	20
18	Hackney Hawks	34	9	1	24	19

M = Matches; W = Wins; D = Draws; L = Losses; Pts = Total Points

== Fixtures and results ==
Home \ Away	BV	BIR	COV	CH	EAS	EX	HAC	HAL	HV	IPS	KL	LEI	PP	RR	SHE	SWI	WIM	WOL
Belle Vue		39–39	42–36	42–36	46–32	38–40	46–32	42–36	29–49	47–31	40–38	44–33	47–31	43–35	38–40	39–39	39–39	39–39
Birmingham	28–50		38–40	37–41	38–40	40–38	46–32	59–19	38–40	32–45	40–38	41–37	39–38	42–36	49–29	38–40	43–35	41–37
Coventry	42–36	43–35		42–36	54–24	40–38	48–30	43–34	42–36	42–36	45–33	52–26	48–30	43–35	51–27	43–35	54–24	48–30
Cradley Heath	46–32	51–27	49–29		51–27	57–21	50–25	64–14	41–37	52–26	49–29	53–24	47–31	40–38	45–33	50–28	57–21	47–31
Eastbourne	38–40	36–42	43–35	36–41		49–28	51–27	44–34	50–27	39–39	35–43	48–30	39–39	37–41	50–28	31–47	42–36	32–46
Exeter	41–37	53–25	40–38	45–33	50–28		50–27	42–35	45–33	55–23	38–40	57–21	51–27	40–38	42–35	44–34	52–26	55–23
Hackney	41–37	46–31	43–35	37–41	38–40	43–35		34–44	33–45	41–37	36–42	42–36	41–37	46–32	39–39	29–49	22–56	44–34
Halifax	49–29	44–34	38–40	46–31	42–36	41–37	55–23		38–40	43–35	49–29	44.5–33.5	53–25	46–32	47–31	45–33	45–33	43–35
Hull	42–36	58–20	51–27	41–37	50–28	45–33	56–22	43–34		57–21	56–22	60–18	62–16	51–27	57–21	55–23	51–27	43–35
Ipswich	47–31	39–39	36–41	33–45	41–37	41–37	52–26	44–34	42–33		37–41	35–42	44–34	33–45	45–33	43–35	42–36	35–42
King's Lynn	43–35	41–37	50–28	47–31	53–25	45–33	55–23	38–40	40–38	42–36		40–38	42–36	49–29	58–20	44–34	52–26	44–34
Leicester	28–50	30–48	30–48	41–37	44–33	32–46	44–34	35–43	38–40	36–42	34–44		40–38	40–38	44–34	41–37	46–32	45–33
Poole	51–26	43–35	55–23	41–37	44–34	33–45	59–19	44–34	39–39	44–34	44–34	50–28		33–45	45–33	39–39	40–37	41–37
Reading	37–41	44–34	35–42	32–46	49–29	46–32	48–30	48–30	42–35	42–36	46–32	52–26	43–35		45–33	43–35	41–37	45–33
Sheffield	41–36	42–36	34–44	44–34	49–29	36–42	48–30	44–34	29–49	47–31	39–39	44–34	46–32	41–37		46–32	45–32	41–37
Swindon	41–37	49–29	37–41	40–38	48–30	38–39	46–31	40–38	39–39	46–32	38–40	59–19	36–42	45–33	50–27		40–38	46–32
Wimbledon	44–34	63–15	37–41	36–42	42–36	41–36	45–32	48–30	41–36	41–37	43–35	50–28	41–37	45–33	56–22	44–34		33–45
Wolverhampton	42–36	36–42	28–50	33–45	44–34	42–33	46–32	43–35	26–52	44–34	44–34	49–29	54–24	45–33	51–27	40–38	36–42	

Legend: Blue = home team win; Yellow = draw; Red = away team win.

== Top ten riders (league averages) ==
	Rider	Nat	Team	C.M.A.
1	Scott Autrey	(United States)	Exeter	10.91
2	Ivan Mauger	(New Zealand)	Hull	10.54
3	Phil Crump	(Australia)	Swindon	10.36
4	Michael Lee	(England)	King's Lynn	10.29
5	John Davis	(England)	Reading	10.22
6	Hans Nielsen	(Denmark)	Wolverhampton	10.16
7	Gordon Kennett	(England)	Eastbourne	10.13
8	Ole Olsen	(Denmark)	Coventry	10.03
9	Bruce Penhall	(United States)	Cradley	10.02
10	Dave Jessup	(England)	King's Lynn	9.80

== British League Knockout Cup ==
The 1979 Speedway Star British League Knockout Cup was the 41st edition of the Knockout Cup for tier one teams. Cradley Heath were the winners.

First round

Date	Team one	Score	Team two
16/06	Cradley Heath	66-42	Leicester
29/05	Leicester	40-68	Cradley Heath
20/04	Eastbourne	65-43	Ipswich
19/04	Ipswich	53-54	Eastbourne

Second round

Date	Team one	Score	Team two
10/09	Cradley Heath	78-29	Wimbledon
09/08	Wimbledon	54-53	Cradley Heath
06/07	Eastbourne	65-43	Reading
18/06	Birmingham	59-49	Swindon
16/06	Coventry	74-34	Poole
16/06	King's Lynn	53-55	Wolverhampton
16/06	Swindon	62-46	Birmingham
15/06	Poole	59-48	Coventry
15/06	Wolverhampton	56-52	King's Lynn
11/06	Reading	77-31	Eastbourne
02/06	Belle Vue	61-47	Exeter
01/06	Hull	81-25	Sheffield
31/05	Exeter	70-38	Belle Vue
31/05	Sheffield	60-48	Hull

Quarter-finals

Date	Team one	Score	Team two
24/09	Cradley Heath	71-37	Wolverhampton
21/09	Wolverhampton	52-56	Cradley Heath
20/08	Reading	53-55	Halifax
14/07	Halifax	79-29	Reading
03/08	Exeter	56-52	Swindon
18/07	Hull	75-34	Coventry
14/07	Coventry	60-48	Hull
14/07	Swindon	46-62	Exeter

Semi-finals

Date	Team one	Score	Team two
07/10	Halifax	49-59	Cradley Heath
06/10	Cradley Heath	43-23	Halifax
19/09	Hull	70-38	Exeter
17/09	Exeter	60-48	Hull

Final

First leg

15 October 1979

Cradley Heath Bruce Penhall 11 Alan Grahame 11 Phil Collins 9 Erik Gundersen 9 Dave Perks 9 Bobby Schwartz 6 Kristian Praestbro 4 John Hack 3	62 - 46	Hull Vikings Ivan Mauger 14 Bobby Beaton 13 Joe Owen 6 Dennis Sigalos 6 Frank Auffret 6 Nigel Close 1 Brian Havelock 0 Graham Drury 0

Second leg

31 October 1979

Hull Vikings Dennis Sigalos 13 Kelly Moran 8 Louis Carr 7 Bobby Beaton 6 Joe Owen 5 Frank Auffret 4 Nigel Close 4 Ivan Mauger 3	50 - 58	Cradley Heath Bruce Penhall 13 Bobby Schwartz 11 Kristian Praestbro 9 Phil Collins 9 Alan Grahame 6 Erik Gundersen 5 John Hack 5 Dave Perks 0

Cradley Heath were declared Knockout Cup Champions, winning on aggregate 120-96.

== Riders' Championship ==
John Louis won the British League Riders' Championship, held at Hyde Road on 20 October and sponsored by Gauntlet (Leyland Used Cars).

Pos.	Rider	Heat Scores	Total
1	(England) John Louis	2 3 3 3 3	14
2	(United States) Bruce Penhall	3 2 3 3 2	13
3	(England) Michael Lee	3 3 2 1 3	12
4	(England) Peter Collins	2 3 2 3 1	11
5	(New Zealand) Larry Ross	3 2 1 1 3	10
6	(Australia) Phil Crump	0 3 3 3 0	9
7	(Denmark) Hans Nielsen	2 2 1 2 2	9
8	(United States) Scott Autrey	1 1 3 1 2	8
9	(Denmark) Ole Olsen	2 2 0 2 1	7
10	(New Zealand) Ivan Mauger	1 R 2 0 1	6
11	(England) Malcolm Simmons	3 0 0 1 1	5
12	(Australia) John Titman	0 1 0 2 2	5
13	(England) Ian Cartright	1 1 1 2 0	5
14	(England) John Davis	0 1 2 0 1	4
15	(England) Andy Grahame	0 0 1 0 0	1
16	(England) Gordon Kennett	1 0 0 0 0	1

- ef=engine failure, f=fell, x=excluded r-retired

== Final leading averages ==
The top ten averages recorded at the end of the season.

	Rider	Nat	Team	C.M.A.
1	Scott Autrey	(United States)	Exeter	10.83
2	Ivan Mauger	(New Zealand)	Hull	10.38
3	Phil Crump	(Australia)	Swindon	10.34
4	John Davis	(England)	Reading	10.32
5	Hans Nielsen	(Denmark)	Wolverhampton	10.29
6	Michael Lee	(England)	King's Lynn	10.21
7	Ole Olsen	(Denmark)	Coventry	9.92
8	Gordon Kennett	(England)	Eastbourne	9.91
9	Bruce Penhall	(United States)	Cradley	9.88
10	Dave Jessup	(England)	King's Lynn	9.72

== Gold Cup ==
East Group

Team	PL	W	D	L	Pts
Ipswich	6	4	0	2	8
King's Lynn	6	4	0	2	8
Reading	6	2	0	4	4
Hackney	6	2	0	4	4

West Group

Team	PL	W	D	L	Pts
Wimbledon	6	4	1	1	9
Exeter	6	3	1	2	7
Eastbourne	6	3	0	3	6
Poole	6	1	0	5	2

East Group

Home \ Away	HAC	IPS	KL	REA
Hackney		39–38	42–36	35–43
Ipswich	44–34		40–38	42–36
King's Lynn	43–35	46–32		42–36
Reading	52–26	38–39	32–36	

Legend: Blue = home team win; Yellow = draw; Red = away team win.

West Group

Home \ Away	EAS	EX	PP	WIM
Eastbourne		40–38	43–35	37–40
Exeter	52–25		54–24	39–39
Poole	35–43	38–40		44–34
Wimbledon	44–33	49–29	48–30	

Legend: Blue = home team win; Yellow = draw; Red = away team win.

Final

Team one	Team two	Score
Ipswich	Wimbledon	41-37, 35-43

== Northern Trophy ==
		M	W	D	L	Pts
1	Sheffield	6	4	1	1	9
2	Halifax	6	3	0	3	6
3	Hull	6	2	1	3	5
4	Belle Vue	6	2	0	4	4

Home \ Away	BV	HAL	HUL	SHE
Belle Vue		40–37	38–40	43–35
Halifax	44–34		47–31	33–45
Hull	46–32	36–42		39–39
Sheffield	41–37	43–35	48–28	

Legend: Blue = home team win; Yellow = draw; Red = away team win.

== Midland Cup ==
Coventry won the Midland Cup for the fourth consecutive year. The competition consisted of six teams and was sponsored by the Trustee Savings Bank.

First round

Team one	Team two	Score
Birmingham	Swindon	32–46, 31–47
Wolverhampton	Cradley	39–38, 32–46

Semi final round

Team one	Team two	Score
Leicester	Swindon	44.5–33.5, 38–40
Coventry	Cradley	46–32, 34–44

Final

First leg

9 October 1979

Leicester Mike Farrell 12 John Boulger 8 John Titman 7 Chris Turner 4 Dave Gooderham 2 Tom Godal 2 Colin Cook 0	35–43	Coventry Ole Olsen 12 Alf Busk 12 Tommy Knudsen 7 Gary Guglielmi 7 Mick Bell 4 Mitch Shirra 1 Kevin Hawkins 0 Alan Molyneux r/r

Leicester Stadium

Second leg

13 October 1979

Coventry Ole Olsen 13 Mitch Shirra 8 Alf Busk 8 Tommy Knudsen 8 Gary Guglielmi 5 Mick Bell 5 Kevin Hawkins 3 Alan Molyneux r/r	50–28	Leicester John Titman 9 Colin Cook 7 John Boulger 6 Rob Henry 4 Ian Clark 1 Tom Godal 1 Mike Farrell 0

Brandon Stadium

Coventry won on aggregate 93–63

== London Cup ==
Hackney won the London Cup but the competition consisted of just Wimbledon and Hackney.

Results

Team	Score	Team
Hackney	44–34	Wimbledon
Wimbledon	43–35	Hackney

== Riders & final averages ==
Belle Vue

- (England) Peter Collins 9.76
- (England) Chris Morton 9.06
- (England) Les Collins 7.60
- (England) Dave Allen 6.00
- (West Germany) Karl Maier 5.56
- (Finland) Pekka Hautamaki 5.17
- (Czechoslovakia) Emil Sova 4.81
- (Australia) Rob Maxfield 4.25
- (England) Derek Richardson 4.21
- (England) Arnold Haley 3.08
- (England) Keith Bloxsome 0.86

Birmingham

- (Australia) Billy Sanders 9.15
- (Australia) Phil Herne 7.91
- (England) Andy Grahame 7.60
- (Denmark) Finn Jensen 6.14
- (England) Alan Emerson 5.90
- (Finland) Ari Koponen 5.05
- (England) Ray Wilson 5.05
- (England) Ted Howgego 4.33
- (Australia) Stuart Mountford 2.72

Coventry

- (Denmark) Ole Olsen 9.92
- (New Zealand) Mitch Shirra 9.13
- (England) Alan Molyneux 8.00
- (Denmark) Alf Busk 6.62
- (Denmark) Tommy Knudsen 6.41
- (Australia) Gary Guglielmi 5.93
- (England) Kevin Hawkins 5.73
- (England) Mick Bell 4.95

Cradley Heath

- (United States) Bruce Penhall 9.88
- (England) Alan Grahame 8.34
- (England) Phil Collins 7.85
- (United States) Bobby Schwartz 7.83
- (England) Steve Bastable 7.71
- (Denmark) Kristian Praestbro 7.54
- (Denmark) Erik Gundersen 7.35
- (England) Dave Perks 6.84
- (England) John Hack 4.77
- (England) Les Rumsey 4.76

Eastbourne

- (England) Gordon Kennett 9.91
- (Finland) Kai Niemi 8.76
- (England) Steve Weatherley 6.98
- (England) Dave Kennett 5.59
- (England) Trevor Geer 5.09
- (England) Eric Dugard 4.27
- (New Zealand) Roger Abel 3.91
- (England) Steve Naylor 3.75
- (England) Paul Woods 3.41
- (England) John Barker 3.09
- (Finland) Veijo Tuoriniemi 2.96

Exeter

- (United States) Scott Autrey 10.83
- (Czech Republic) Václav Verner 8.49
- (Zimbabwe) Peter Prinsloo 6.94
- (Czech Republic) Aleš Dryml Sr. 6.47
- (Czech Republic) Jan Verner 6.40
- (Australia) Steve Koppe 6.17
- (England) Nigel Boocock 6.06
- (Czech Republic) Zdeněk Kudrna 6.05

Hackney

- (Poland) Zenon Plech 7.78
- (Denmark) Bo Petersen 7.74
- (Denmark) Finn Thomsen 7.70
- (England) Barry Thomas 5.09
- (England) Vic Harding 4.33
- (England) Bobby McNeil 4.00
- (England) Sean Willmott 3.80
- (England) Keith White 3.63

Halifax

- (England) Ian Cartwright 8.95
- (England) Kenny Carter 8.13
- (Denmark) Mike Lohmann 7.59
- (Norway) Tormod Langli 6.93
- (Australia) Mick McKeon 6.87
- (Denmark) Klaus Lohmann 5.18
- (Australia) Merv Janke 4.84
- (England) Steve Wilcock 4.24

Hull

- (New Zealand) Ivan Mauger 10.38
- (Scotland) Bobby Beaton 8.62
- (United States) Kelly Moran 8.47
- (England) Joe Owen 8.40
- (United States) Dennis Sigalos 7.46
- (Wales) Graham Drury 6.75
- (England) Frank Auffret 6.01

Ipswich

- (England) John Louis 9.32
- (Australia) Billy Sanders 9.21
- (England) Tony Davey 7.51
- (England) Kevin Jolly 7.43
- (Sweden) Anders Michanek 7.33
- (England) Mike Lanham 6.43
- (England) Tim Hunt 4.95
- (Denmark) Preben Eriksen 4.45
- (England) Colin Cook 4.00
- (Czech Republic) Milan Spinka 3.76
- (England) Andy Hines 3.41
- (England) Nigel Flatman 3.27
- (England) Kevin Teager 2.10

King's Lynn

- (England) Michael Lee 10.21
- (England) Dave Jessup 9.72
- (Sweden) Richard Hellsen 8.58
- (England) Ian Turner 5.98
- (Denmark) Bent Rasmussen 5.24
- (England) David Gagen 5.00
- (England) Pete Smith 4.97
- (England) Derek Harrison 4.26
- (England) Bob Garrad 3.87
- (England) Rob Hollingworth 2.27

Leicester

- (Australia) John Titman 8.47
- (Finland) Ila Teromaa 6.28
- (Australia) Mike Farrell 5.99
- (Australia) John Boulger 5.88
- (England) Colin Cook 5.40
- (Norway) Tom Godal 4.75
- (Australia) John McNeill 4.14
- (England) Chris Turner 3.49
- (England) Robert Henry 3.47

Poole

- (England) Malcolm Simmons 9.04
- (United States) Ron Preston 8.58
- (Sweden) Christer Sjösten 6.49
- (England) Neil Middleditch 6.48
- (Australia) Danny Kennedy 6.06
- (Poland) Andrzej Tkocz 5.82
- (England) Martin Yeates 4.33
- (England) Kelvin Mullarkey 2.57

Reading

- (England) John Davis 10.32
- (Sweden) Jan Andersson 8.64
- (England) Terry Betts 7.75
- (England) Bernie Leigh 6.31
- (England) Melvyn Taylor 5.65
- (Norway) Reidar Eide 5.23
- (Australia) Bob Humphreys 5.16
- (Czech Republic) Jiří Štancl 5.12
- (England) Ashley Pullen 3.75

Sheffield

- (England) Reg Wilson 8.74
- (England) Doug Wyer 7.57
- (England) Craig Pendlebury 6.47
- (England) Eric Broadbelt 6.03
- (Netherlands) Henny Kroeze 4.92
- (England) Nicky Allott 4.84
- (England) Steve Finch 4.52
- (England) Phil White 4.37
- (England) Keith Evans 4.17
- (United States) Tommy Morley 3.61
- (England) Neil Collins 3.33

Swindon

- (Australia) Phil Crump 10.34
- (England) Bob Kilby 7.65
- (United States) Steve Gresham 6.98
- (England) Geoff Bouchard 6.30
- (England) Martin Ashby 6.06
- (Denmark) Steen Mastrup 5.92
- (Norway) Rolf Gramstad 4.66
- (England) Malcolm Holloway 3.52

Wimbledon

- (Poland) Edward Jancarz 9.26
- (New Zealand) Larry Ross 8.97
- (England) Roger Johns 7.89
- (Sweden) Stefan Salomonsso 7.38
- (Netherlands) Rudy Muts 6.91
- (England) Mick Hines 5.47
- (England) Colin Richardson 5.39
- (England) Richard Knight 4.35
- (New Zealand) Pat Pawson 1.86
- (England) Dave Brewer 1.38

Wolverhampton

- (Denmark) Hans Nielsen 10.29
- (Scotland) Jimmy McMillan 7.93
- (England) Dave Morton 6.81
- (Scotland) George Hunter 6.73
- (Sweden) Hasse Danielsson 6.39
- (New Zealand) Bruce Cribb 5.84
- (Norway) Edgar Stangeland 5.44
- (England) Dave Trownson 5.23
- (Norway) Trond Helge Skretting 3.52

== See also ==
- List of United Kingdom Speedway League Champions
- Knockout Cup (speedway)
