= 1981 British League season =

British speedway season

- League: British League
- No. of competitors: 16
- Champions: Cradley Heath Heathens
- Knockout Cup: Ipswich Witches
- League Cup: Coventry Bees
- Individual: Kenny Carter
- Midland Cup: Coventry Bees
- London Cup: Hackney Hawks
- Highest average: Bruce Penhall
- Division/s below: 1981 National League

The 1981 British League season was the 47th season of the top tier of motorcycle speedway in the United Kingdom and the 17th known as the British League.

== Summary ==
The league comprised 16 teams - one fewer than the previous season. Wolverhampton Wolves had dropped down to the National League.

American Bruce Penhall (who would be crowned world champion by the end of the season) topped the averages and helped Cradley Heathens win their first title. The Cradley team included Penhall, rising Danish star Erik Gundersen and British internationals Alan Grahame and Phil Collins. The league runner-up Ipswich Witches gained some consolation by winning the Knockout Cup.

The year saw a changing of the guard as a number of young riders broke through as heat leaders. American duo Penhall and Dennis Sigalos led Cradley Heath and Ipswich respectively, Danish trio Gundersen, Hans Nielsen and Tommy Knudsen all qualified for the World Final, and Kenny Carter finished as top Englishman in the World Final and won the League Riders' Championship.

== Final league table ==
Pos	Team	PL	W	D	L	Pts
1	Cradley Heathens	30	26	1	3	53
2	Ipswich Witches	30	21	4	5	46
3	Swindon Robins	30	19	3	8	41
4	Belle Vue Aces	30	19	1	10	39
5	Coventry Bees	30	18	0	12	36
6	Birmingham Brummies	30	13	1	16	27
7	Halifax Dukes	30	13	1	16	27
8	Hackney Hawks	30	12	2	16	26
9	Poole Pirates	30	12	2	16	26
10	Sheffield Tigers	30	13	0	17	26
11	Reading Racers	30	9	7	14	25
12	Hull Vikings	30	10	4	16	24
13	Eastbourne Eagles	30	10	3	17	23
14	King's Lynn Stars	30	10	2	18	22
15	Leicester Lions	30	11	0	19	22
16	Wimbledon Dons	30	7	3	20	17

M = Matches; W = Wins; D = Draws; L = Losses; Pts = Total Points

== Fixtures and results ==
Home \ Away	BV	BIR	COV	CH	EAS	HAC	HAL	HV	IPS	KL	LEI	PP	RR	SHE	SWI	WIM
Belle Vue		51–27	43–35	29–49	52–26	41–37	40–38	44–33	50–28	46–32	44–34	47–31	45–33	43–35	38–40	58–20
Birmingham	44–34		42–36	34–44	44–34	46–32	51–27	47–30	38–40	40–38	44–34	42–36	39–39	53–25	42–36	48–30
Coventry	47–31	53–25		26–52	45–33	45–33	48–30	51–27	42–36	42–36	44–34	44–34	42–35	50–28	37–41	43–35
Cradley Heath	40–26	47–31	44–33		58–20	40–38	48–30	52–26	47–30	46–32	49–29	52–26	50–28	47–30	43–35	47–31
Eastbourne	39–39	40–38	38–40	35–43		43–35	50–28	48–30	39–39	38–40	40–38	41–37	44–34	46–32	38–39	48–30
Hackney	43–34	47–31	41–37	38–40	42–36		43–35	55–23	38–40	43–35	38–40	36–42	46–32	49–29	38–40	42–36
Halifax	37–41	45–33	41–36	41–37	47–30	42–36		46–32	48–30	42–36	41–37	46–32	37–41	54–24	42–35	49–29
Hull	42–36	42–36	43–35	34–44	46–32	45–33	39–39		39–39	42–36	47–31	45–33	45–33	47–30	39–39	39–39
Ipswich	41–37	39–38	42–35	44–34	54–24	44–34	51–27	52–26		40–38	48–30	53–25	41–37	52–24	39–39	43–35
King's Lynn	29–49	47–31	34–44	37–41	36–42	42–36	46–32	49–29	38–40		35–43	53–25	39–39	49–29	34–44	54–24
Leicester	40–38	40–38	35–43	37–41	43–35	44–34	41–37	41–37	35–43	37–41		45–33	47–31	33–45	38–40	46–32
Poole	38–40	45–33	29–49	36–41	44–34	37–41	46–32	45–33	34–44	41–37	44.5–33.5		39–39	46–32	42–35	50–28
Reading	38–40	40–37	40–38	38–40	39–39	39–39	40–38	47–31	37–41	39–39	40–38	39–39		48–30	34–44	43–35
Sheffield	38–40	43–35	49–29	29–49	56–22	42–36	50–28	49–29	41–37	40–38	47–31	35–42	38–40		41–37	58–20
Swindon	41–37	46–32	42–36	42–36	51–27	38–40	42–36	40–14	39–39	43–35	49–29	42–36	41–36	47–30		38–40
Wimbledon	31–46	34–44	30–47	38–38	45–33	39–39	44–34	44–34	37–41	31–47	43–34	37–41	47–31	37–41	41–37	

Legend: Blue = home team win; Yellow = draw; Red = away team win.

== Top ten riders (league averages) ==
	Rider	Nat	Team	C.M.A.
1	Bruce Penhall	(United States)	Cradley	11.08
2	Kenny Carter	(England)	Halifax	10.50
3	Phil Crump	(Australia)	Swindon	10.39
4	Michael Lee	(England)	King's Lynn	10.34
5	Erik Gundersen	(Denmark)	Cradley	10.26
6	Chris Morton	(England)	Belle Vue	10.26
7	Jan Andersson	(Sweden)	Reading	10.02
8	Gordon Kennett	(England)	Eastbourne	9.95
9	Kelly Moran	(United States)	Eastbourne	9.83
10	Hans Nielsen	(Denmark)	Birmingham	9.83

== British League Knockout Cup ==
The 1981 Speedway Star British League Knockout Cup was the 43rd edition of the Knockout Cup for tier one teams. Ipswich Witches were the winners.

First round

Date	Team one	Score	Team two
04/06	Middlesbrough	43-53	Eastbourne
23/05	Berwick	39-57	Wimbledon
08/05	Peterborough	50-46	Halifax
04/05	Newcastle	40-56	Leicester
08/05	Edinburgh	49-47	Sheffield
12/04	Mildenhall	38-58	Poole
31/05	Rye House	34-62	Birmingham
03/05	Boston	47-48	Hull

Second round

Date	Team one	Score	Team two
08/07	Poole	49-47	Leicester
24/06	Hull	54-42	Belle Vue
23/06	Leicester	51-45	Poole
20/06	Cradley Heath	60-36	Eastbourne
14/06	Peterborough	38-58	Birmingham
13/06	Belle Vue	53-43	Hull
11/06	Wimbledon	40-56	Reading
08/06	Birmingham	63-33	Peterborough
08/06	Reading	55-41	Wimbledon
07/06	Eastbourne	49-47	Cradley Heath
30/05	Coventry	63-33	Hackney
30/05	Swindon	69-27	Edinburgh
29/05	Hackney	37-59	Coventry
01/05	Kings Lynn	47-49	Ipswich
21/05	Ipswich	53-43	Kings Lynn
12/06	Edinburgh	47-49	Swindon

Quarter-finals

Date	Team one	Score	Team two
03/09	Swindon	74-22	Leicester
25/08	Leicester	45-51	Swindon
20/08	Ipswich	54-42	Cradley Heath
12/08	Cradley Heath	48-48	Ipswich
03/08	Reading	51-45	Coventry
24/07	Birmingham	52-44	Hull
22/07	Hull	49-47	Birmingham
11/07	Coventry	49-45	Reading

Semi-finals

Date	Team one	Score	Team two
28/09	Reading	49-47	Birmingham
18/09	Birmingham	54-42	Reading
18/09	Swindon	46-50	Ipswich
10/09	Ipswich	57-39	Swindon

=== Final ===
First leg

16 October 1981

Birmingham Brummies Hans Nielsen 14 Kai Niemi 13 Andy Grahame 8 Bruce Cribb 8 Neil Evitts 4 Simon Wigg 0 Paul Thorp 0	47 - 49	Ipswich Witches Preben Eriksen 12 John Cook 11 Kevin Jolly 7 Dennis Sigalos 6 Tim Hunt 6 Mike Lanham 5 Nigel Flatman 2

Second leg

25 October 1981

Ipswich Witches Dennis Sigalos 11 John Cook 10 Preben Eriksen 8 Kevin Jolly 7 Mike Lanham 7 Tim Hunt 6 Nigel Flatman 2	51 - 45	Birmingham Brummies Hans Nielsen 17 Andy Grahame 17 Kai Niemi 8 Bruce Cribb 1 Neil Evitts 1 Mike Wilding 1 Paul Thorp 0

The Ipswich Witches were declared Knockout Cup champions, winning on aggregate 100-92.

== League Cup ==
The League Cup was inaugurated in 1981 with the 16 teams split into North and South sections comprising 8 teams each that met each other home and away. The winners of each section qualified for the two-legged final with Coventry Bees beating King's Lynn Stars in the final 120–70 on aggregate.

North Group

Home \ Away	BV	BIR	COV	CH	HAL	HUL	LEI	SHE
Belle Vue		54–42	47–49	51–45	50–45	51–45	51–45	46.5–49.5
Birmingham	51–45		42–54	35–61	66–30	51–5	49–47	68–28
Coventry	69–27	59–36		65–31	59–37	53–43	50–46	53–45
Cradley	55–41	58–38	57–39		65–31	63–33	53–43	54–42
Halifax	47–48	50–46	32–64	42–54		60–36	52–42	58–38
Hull	50–46	55–41	43–53	44–52	54–42		68–28	53–43
Leicester	54–42	42–54	47–49	42–54	60–36	59–37		54–42
Sheffield	47–49	49–47	57–39	51–45	50–46	49–47	53–43	

Legend: Blue = home team win; Yellow = draw; Red = away team win.

South Group

Home \ Away	EAS	HAC	IPS	KL	PP	REA	SWI	WIM
Eastbourne		50–45	39–56	38–57	55–41	47–49	50–46	59–37
Hackney	52–44		51–45	48–48	51–43	48–47	41–55	59–37
Ipswich	61–35	63–33		65–31	53–42	47–49	59–37	71–24
King's Lynn	53–43	52–44	58–38		50–46	50–46	55–40	66–29
Poole	55–41	64–32	53–43	48.5–47.5		56–40	54–42	62–34
Reading	55–40	59–37	57–38	54.5–41.5	63–33		64–32	55–41
Swindon	57–39	62–34	42–54	56–40	47–49	50–46		52–44
Wimbledon	40–56	49.5–46.5	44–52	46–50	52–44	40–56	46–49	

Legend: Blue = home team win; Yellow = draw; Red = away team win.

North Group

Pos	Team	PL	W	D	L	Pts
1	Coventry Bees	14	12	0	2	24
2	Cradley Heathens	14	11	0	3	22
3	Belle Vue Aces	14	7	0	7	14
4	Sheffield Tigers	14	7	0	7	14
5	Birmingham Brummies	14	6	0	8	12
6	Hull Vikings	14	5	0	9	10
7	Leicester Lions	14	4	0	10	8
8	Halifax Dukes	14	4	0	10	8

South Group

Pos	Team	PL	W	D	L	Pts
1	King's Lynn Stars	14	10	1	3	21
2	Reading Racers	14	10	0	4	20
3	Ipswich Witches	14	9	0	5	18
4	Poole Pirates	14	7	0	7	14
5	Swindon Robins	14	7	0	7	14
6	Hackney Hawks	14	5	1	8	11
7	Eastbourne Eagles	14	5	0	9	10
8	Wimbledon Dons	14	2	0	12	4

Final

Date	Team one	Score	Team two
10/10	Coventry	68–28	King's Lynn
11/10	King's Lynn	42–54	Coventry

== Riders' Championship ==
Kenny Carter won the British League Riders' Championship, held at Hyde Road on 17 October and sponsored by the Daily Mirror.

Pos.	Rider	Heat Scores	Total
1	(England) Kenny Carter	3 3 3 3 3	15
2	(England) Chris Morton	3 3 2 2 3	13+3
3	(United States) Shawn Moran	3 2 3 2 3	13+2
4	(Australia) Phil Crump	2 3 2 1 2	10
5	(England) Dave Jessup	1 2 1 3 2	9
6	(Denmark) Hans Nielsen	1 3 3 1 0	8
7	(United States) Dennis Sigalos	2 1 0 2 3	8
8	(United States) Bruce Penhall	2 2 1 1 2	8
9	(England) Les Collins	1 0 3 2 1	7
10	(England) Malcolm Simmons	2 0 1 3 1	7
11	(England) Gordon Kennett	1 2 2 0 1	6
12	(United States) Scott Autrey	3 0 1 0 1	5
13	(Sweden) Jan Andersson	0 1 2 0 2	5
14	(Denmark) Bo Petersen	0 1 0 3 0	4
15	(Denmark) Ole Olsen	0 1 0 1	2
16	(England) Joe Owen	0 0 0 0 0	0
17	(England) Gary O'Hare (res)	0 - - - -	0

- ef=engine failure, f=fell, x=excluded r-retired

== Final leading averages ==
	Rider	Nat	Team	C.M.A.
1	Bruce Penhall	(United States)	Cradley	11.01
2	Kenny Carter	(England)	Halifax	10.17
=3	Phil Crump	(Australia)	Swindon	10.30
=3	Michael Lee	(England)	King's Lynn	10.30
5	Jan Andersson	(Sweden)	Reading	10.26
6	Hans Nielsen	(Denmark)	Birmingham	9.80
7	Chris Morton	(England)	Belle Vue	9.75
8	Erik Gundersen	(Denmark)	Cradley	9.72
9	John Davis	(England)	Poole	9.70
10	Gordon Kennett	(England)	Eastbourne	9.67

== Midland Cup ==
Coventry won the Midland Cup. The competition consisted of five teams and was sponsored by the Trustee Savings Bank.

First round

Team one	Team two	Score
Birmingham	Swindon	39–39, 37–41

Semi final round

Team one	Team two	Score
Leicester	Coventry	33–44, 34–44
Swindon	Cradley	44–33, 32–46

Final

First leg

14 October 1981

Cradley Heath Erik Gundersen 12 Bruce Penhall 11 Alan Grahame 9 Phil Collins 3 John McNeill 2 Dave Shields 2 Bent Rasmussen 0	39–39	Coventry Ole Olsen 9 Tommy Knudsen 8 Gary Guglielmi 7 Keith White 6 Kevin Hawkins 5 Steve Wilcock 3 Mitch Shirra 1

Dudley Wood Stadium

Second leg

15 October 1981

Coventry Ole Olsen 12 Tommy Knudsen 8 Mitch Shirra 7 Keith White 7 Gary Guglielmi 6 Kevin Hawkins 4 Rob Hollingworth 1	45–33	Cradley Heath Bruce Penhall 12 Alan Grahame 12 Dave Shields 5 Erik Gundersen 3 Phil Collins 1 Bent Rasmussen 0 John McNeill 0

Brandon Stadium

Coventry won on aggregate 84–72

== London Cup ==
Hackney won the London Cup but the competition consisted of just Wimbledon and Hackney.

Results

Team	Score	Team
Wimbledon	43–36	Hackney
Hackney	46–32	Wimbledon

== Riders and final averages ==
Belle Vue

- (England) Chris Morton 9.75
- (New Zealand) Larry Ross 9.08
- (England) Peter Collins 7.33 (3 matches only)
- (England) Neil Collins 7.00
- (Australia) Rob Maxfield 6.95
- (Scotland) Jimmy McMillan 6.02
- (England) Louis Carr 5.60
- (Denmark) Mike Lohmann 5.58
- (United States) Larry Kosta 5.51
- (Denmark) Peter Ravn 4.74

Birmingham

- (Denmark) Hans Nielsen 9.80
- (England) Andy Grahame 8.64
- (Finland) Kai Niemi 7.44
- (Finland) Ari Koponen 6.41
- (Denmark) Finn Jensen 5.89
- (United States) Keith Chrisco 5.13
- (New Zealand) Bruce Cribb 5.06
- (England) Neil Evitts 4.93
- (Sweden) Hasse Danielsson 4.90
- (England) Paul Thorp 2.14

Coventry

- (Denmark) Ole Olsen 9.42
- (Denmark) Tommy Knudsen 9.41
- (New Zealand) Mitch Shirra 8.13
- (Australia) Gary Guglielmi 6.61
- (England) Kevin Hawkins 6.58
- (Denmark) Alf Busk 6.17
- (England) Keith White 5.55
- (England) Rob Hollingworth 5.46
- (England) Steve Wilcock 3.29

Cradley Heath

- (United States) Bruce Penhall 11.01
- (Denmark) Erik Gundersen 9.72
- (England) Alan Grahame 9.11
- (England) Phil Collins 7.58
- (Australia) David Shields 5.23
- (Denmark) Bent Rasmussen 5.00
- (Australia) John McNeill 3.86
- (England) Arnold Haley 0.70

Eastbourne

- (England) Gordon Kennett 9.67
- (United States) Kelly Moran 9.28
- (England) Paul Woods 6.96
- (England) Richard Greer 4.44
- (England) Trevor Geer 4.24
- (England) Dave Kennett 3.92
- (Finland) Olli Tyrväinen 3.75
- (Poland) Robert Słaboń 2.89
- (England) Eric Dugard 2.80

Hackney

- (Denmark) Bo Petersen 9.58
- (Denmark) Finn Thomsen 7.83
- (England) Sean Willmott 7.04
- (Poland) Zenon Plech 6.28
- (England) Barry Thomas 5.52
- (Poland) Roman Jankowski 5.19
- (England) Bob Garrad 4.94
- (England) Ted Hubbard 3.58
- (England) Ian Clark 3.13
- (England) Simon Aindow 1.06

Halifax

- (England) Kenny Carter 10.17
- (England) John Louis 7.82
- (England) Ian Cartwright 7.80
- (England) Craig Pendlebury 6.38
- (Poland) Piotr Pyszny 5.30
- (England) Doug Wyer 5.16
- (England) Dave Trownson 4.65
- (Australia) Steve Baker 3.55
- (Australia) Rob Ashton 2.98
- (England) Ian Westwell 0.92

Hull

- (Australia) Billy Sanders 9.18
- (New Zealand) Ivan Mauger 8.67
- (England) Joe Owen 7.28
- (Scotland) Bobby Beaton 5.56
- (Wales) Graham Drury 5.36
- (England) Frank Auffret 4.83
- (Australia) Rod Hunter 4.67
- (Denmark) John Eskildsen 4.62
- (New Zealand) David Bargh 4.11

Ipswich

- (United States) Dennis Sigalos 8.92
- (United States) John Cook 8.63
- (England) Kevin Jolly 8.07
- (Denmark) Preben Eriksen 6.98
- (England) Mike Lanham 6.62
- (England) Nigel Flatman 6.16
- (England) Tim Hunt 6.12

King's Lynn

- (England) Michael Lee 10.30
- (England) Dave Jessup 9.56
- (Sweden) Richard Hellsen 7.34
- (England) Melvyn Taylor 6.93
- (England) David Gagen 4.51
- (England) Craig Featherby 4.13
- (England) Nigel Sparshott 3.65
- (Sweden) Pierre Brannefors 3.16
- (Sweden) Hasse Danielsson 2.96
- (England) Dennis Mallett 2.42

Leicester

- (England) Les Collins 8.55
- (Australia) John Titman 7.44
- (Norway) Rolf Gramstad 7.03
- (Australia) Phil Herne 5.96
- (England) Colin Cook 5.83
- (Denmark) Finn Jensen 5.76
- (England) Pete Smith 4.90
- (England) Ian Clark 4.52
- (Australia) Steve Regeling 3.33

Poole

- (England) John Davis 9.70
- (United States) Scott Autrey 8.42
- (United States) Ron Preston 7.68
- (England) Kevin Smith 7.48
- (Australia) Danny Kennedy 7.41
- (Zimbabwe) Peter Prinsloo 6.56
- (England) Neil Middleditch 6.10
- (Australia) Les Sawyer 3.09
- (England) Pete Ellams 2.52
- (Australia) Malc Bedkober 1.28
- (Denmark) Claes Jensen 0.14

Reading

- (Sweden) Jan Andersson 10.26
- (England) John Davis 9.66
- (United States) Bobby Schwartz 9.31
- (England) Bernie Leigh 5.30
- (England) Tony Briggs 5.00
- (United States) Denny Pyeatt 4.86
- (England) Ashley Pullen 4.55
- (England) Ian Gledhill 3.82
- (Germany) Peter Wurterle 1.52

Sheffield

- (United States) Shawn Moran 8.27
- (England) Dave Morton 8.02
- (England) Eric Broadbelt 6.64
- (England) Phil White 5.78
- (England) Alan Molyneux 5.69
- (England) Reg Wilson 5.62
- (New Zealand) Wayne Brown 5.20
- (Australia) Mark Fiora 4.54
- (England) Paul Stead 2.33
- (England) Rob Carter 1.29

Swindon

- (Australia) Phil Crump 10.30
- (England) Steve Bastable 8.55
- (United States) Steve Gresham 7.52
- (Zimbabwe) Mike Ferreira 7.05
- (England) Malcolm Holloway 6.88
- (Denmark) Steen Mastrup 6.03
- (England) Martin Yeates 4.98
- (Sweden) Bjorn Andersson 4.70
- (England) Martin Satchell 1.78
- (Finland) Veijo Tuoriniemi 0.42

Wimbledon

- (England) Malcolm Simmons 8.37
- (Poland) Edward Jancarz 8.00
- (England) Roger Johns 6.92
- (England) Colin Richardson 6.84
- (United States) Brad Oxley 5.38
- (Sweden) Anders Eriksson 4.38
- (Netherlands) Rudy Muts 4.12
- (England) Peter Johns 2.48
- (England) Eric Dugard 2.30
- (England) Alan Mogridge 1.80

== See also ==
- List of United Kingdom Speedway League Champions
- Knockout Cup (speedway)
