= 1982 Individual Speedway World Championship =

Motorcycle speedway world championship season

Seasons
- ← 1981 1983 →

The 1982 Individual Speedway World Championship was the 37th edition of the official World Championship to determine the world champion rider.

The 1982 World Final was held in Los Angeles in the United States. This was the only time the Individual World Final was held outside of England or Europe before the advent of the Speedway Grand Prix series in 1995.

The 400 metres (440 yards) speedway track for the final was laid out over the Los Angeles Memorial Coliseum's existing athletics track. The event was held in front of a crowd of approximately 40,000 people, the largest ever motorcycle speedway attendance in the United States.

== Controversy ==
Heat 14 of the championship proved to be the most controversial race of the night, and one of the most controversial heats in the whole of speedway history. After a slow start which saw defending champion Bruce Penhall, and England's Kenny Carter in 3rd and 4th places behind 1976 World Champion Peter Collins and Australian Phil Crump, both riders fought their way past Crump and into 2nd and 3rd behind Collins. Carter moved under Penhall into 2nd place at the end of the 2nd lap, and both riders proceeded to bump each other down the front straight with Carter emerging in front. Carter then went wide through turn 1 which allowed Penhall to come back underneath him. Carter then fell coming onto the back straight and went through the fence causing the race to be stopped. Norwegian referee Torrie Kittlesen then excluded Carter from the race for causing the stoppage. Carter protested claiming that Penhall had hit him in the corner causing him to come off his bike and walked back to the start line in an effort to stop the re-run going ahead without him. Officials and his manager Ivan Mauger were then forced to remove Carter from the track.

Although not shown in the television broadcast of the event, amateur video footage shot from the stands in turns 1 & 2 vindicated Kittlesen's decision. The footage showed that Penhall and Carter did not touch in the turn and that the Englishman had gone down on his own, though years later the debate still rages on about who was at fault. In a television interview with American broadcaster Ken Squier soon after the heat, Kittlesen told that he excluded Carter as he believed the Englishman had fallen without help from Penhall. He also said that the rough riding such as seen from Penhall and Carter on the front straight was to be expected in a World Final. Phil Crump, who had the best view of the incident as he was directly behind the pair, allegedly agreed with the decision to exclude Carter.

Penhall went on to win the re-run from Collins and Crump. In a twist, the result in the re-run ultimately cost Collins' younger brother Les the World Championship in what was his first and only World Final appearance. Had Penhall finished second in Heat 14 behind Peter Collins, and with later results, he and Les Collins could have finished with 13 points each which would have seen the pair in a runoff for the championship. Les Collins had inflicted Penhall's only loss of the meeting when he out-rode the American in Heat 4 in what many believe was a major upset. Additionally, if Penhall had been excluded from Heat 14 and not Carter, Les Collins would have a small chance of winning the title as he had finished with a 2-point lead over third placed American Dennis Sigalos, however Carter would have had a good chance of winning a re-run Heat 14 which would give him a two-point advantage over Les Collins before they met, so Carter would have been favourite. Had Penhall only finished on 11 points he would have had a runoff with fellow American Kelly Moran for third place.

In another controversial decision, two races later Kittlesen excluded Czechoslovakia's Václav Verner after a clash with West Germany's Georg Hack, the incident being similar to the Penhall / Carter incident. However, on this occasion it was the rider who stayed on his bike, Verner, who was excluded (though video evidence available to Kittlesen at the time clearly showed Verner's back wheel taking out Hack's front wheel).

The controversy did not end there because Penhall then quit speedway immediately to pursue an acting career (specifically for a role in CHiPs). The decision angered many in speedway circles with calls for the American to be stripped of his title.

== First round ==
=== British qualification ===
- Top 16 Riders progress to British semi-finals

| Date | Venue | Winner | 2nd | 3rd |
Preliminary Round
| 13 April | Wessex Stadium, Weymouth | Simon Wigg | Ian Clark | Dave Perks |
| 25 April | Rye House Stadium, Hoddesdon | Bob Garrad | Nigel Flatman | Steve Naylor |
| 25 April | Boston Sports Stadium, Boston | Colin Cook | Mark Courtney | Rob Hollingworth |
| 27 April | Crayford & Bexleyheath Stadium, Crayford | Steve Wilcock | Mike Ferreira | Barry Thomas |
| 29 April | Oxford Stadium, Oxford | Derek Harrison | Tim Hunt | Neil Collins |
Quarter-Final
| 7 May | East of England Arena, Peterborough | Simon Wigg | Mark Courtney | Mike Ferreira |

=== Swedish qualification ===
- Top 8 in each heat to Swedish final

(7 May, Motala Arena, Motala)
| Pos | Rider | Points |
|---|---|---|
| 1 | Lillebror Johansson | 12 |
| 2 | Lennart Bengtsson | 12 |
| 3 | Anders Michanek | 12 |
| 4 | Bernt Persson | 10 |
| 5 | Åke Fridell | 10 |
| 6 | Börje Ring | 10 |
| 7 | Pierre Brannefors | 9 |
| 8 | Jan Ericsson | 9 |
| 9 | Conny Samuelsson | 8 |
| 10 | Per-Ove Gudmundsson | 8 |
| 11 | Lars Johansson | 8 |
| 12 | Åke Axelsson | 5 |
| 13 | Sören Brolin | 3 |
| 14 | Karl-Erik Claesson | 3 |
| 15 | Thomas Hydling | 2 |
| 16 | Peter Danielsson | 2 |

(9 May, Gislaved Motorbana, Gislaved)
| Pos | Rider | Points |
|---|---|---|
| 1 | Richard Hellsén | 14 |
| 2 | Hans Danielsson | 13 |
| 3 | Tommy Nilsson | 12 |
| 4 | Björn Andersson | 12 |
| 5 | Uno Johansson | 10 |
| 6 | Tommy Johansson | 9 |
| 7 | Anders Eriksson | 8 |
| 8 | Roger Gustavsson | 7 |
| 9 | Lars Hammarberg | 6 |
| 10 | Gert Carlsson | 6 |
| 11 | Lars Rosberg | 6 |
| 12 | Lars Ericsson | 5 |
| 13 | Anders Kling | 4 |
| 14 | Börje Klingberg | 4 |
| 15 | Ulf Blomqvist | 3 |
| 16 | Lars-Olov Karlsson | 1 |

=== Australian qualification ===
| Date | Event | Venue | Winner | 2nd | 3rd |
|---|---|---|---|---|---|
| 28 Nov 81 | Queensland Final | Pioneer Park Speedway, Ayr | Steve Koppe | Merv Janke | John Titman |
| 2 Jan | Southern Zone Final | Western International Raceway, Melbourne | Phil Crump | Danny Kennedy | Terry Tulloch |
| 3 Jan | Northern Zone Final | Rockhampton Showgrounds, Rockhampton | Gary Guglielmi | Billy Sanders | John Titman |

=== New Zealand qualification ===
| Date | Event | Venue | Winner | 2nd | 3rd |
|---|---|---|---|---|---|
| 16 Jan | South Island Final | Ruapuna Speedway, Christchurch | Larry Ross | Roger Wright | Alan Mason |
| 24 Jan | North Island Final | Kihikihi Speedway, Kihikihi | Mitch Shirra | David Bargh | John Goodall |

== Second round ==
=== Continental preliminary round ===
| Date | Venue | Winner | 2nd | 3rd |
|---|---|---|---|---|
| 24 April | (Netherlands) Olympic Stadium, Amsterdam | (Poland) Alfred Siekierka | (Czechoslovakia) Václav Verner | (Czechoslovakia) Petr Kucera |
| 25 April | (Czechoslovakia) Svítkov Stadium, Pardubice | (Czechoslovakia) Petr Ondrašík | (Soviet Union) Viktor Kuznetsov | (Czechoslovakia) Milan Špinka |
| 25 April | (Bulgaria) Speedway Stadium, Targovishte | (Poland) Roman Jankowski | (Soviet Union) Mikhail Starostin | (Czechoslovakia) Jan Verner |
| 26 April | (Socialist Federal Republic of Yugoslavia) Gradski stadion, Osijek | (West Germany) Josef Aigner | (Soviet Union) Valery Gordeev | (Bulgaria) Nikolaj Manev |

=== British semi-finals ===
- 14 May
- (England) Hackney Wick Stadium, London
- Top 8 to British final

| Pos. | Rider | Points |
|---|---|---|
| 1 | Les Collins | 15 |
| 2 | John Louis | 12 |
| 3 | Dave Jessup | 11 |
| 4 | Michael Lee | 11 |
| 5 | Paul Woods | 10 |
| 6 | Mike Ferreira | 9 |
| 7 | Kevin Jolly | 9 |
| 8 | Chris Morton | 8 |
| 9 | Gordon Kennett | 7 |
| 10 | Sean Willmott | 7 |
| 11 | Colin Richardson | 5 |
| 12 | Colin Cook | 4 |
| 13 | Kevin Smith | 4 |
| 14 | Robert Henry | 3 |
| 15 | Roger Johns | 3 |
| 16 | Derek Harrison | 2 |

- 14 May
- (England) Birchfield Ladbroke Stadium, Birmingham
- Top 8 to British final

| Pos. | Rider | Points |
|---|---|---|
| 1 | Alan Grahame | 13 |
| 2 | Kenny Carter | 12 |
| 3 | Andy Grahame | 12 |
| 4 | Phil Collins | 12 |
| 5 | Malcolm Holloway | 11 |
| 6 | Peter Collins | 9 |
| 7 | Simon Wigg | 9 |
| 8 | John Davis | 8 |
| 9 | Melvyn Taylor | 8 |
| 10 | Mark Courtney | 7 |
| 11 | Steve Bastable | 6 |
| 12 | Ian Cartwright | 5 |
| 13 | Dave Morton | 2 |
| 14 | Rob Hollingworth | 2 |
| 15 | Malcolm Simmons | 2 |
| 16 | Neil Collins | 1 |

== Third round ==
=== Continental quarter-finals ===
- Top 32 to Continental semi-finals

| Date | Venue | Winner | 2nd | 3rd |
|---|---|---|---|---|
| 9 May | (Austria) Stadion Wiener Neustadt | (West Germany) Karl Maier | (West Germany) Josef Aigner | (Soviet Union) Valery Gordeev |
| 9 May | (West Germany) Motodrom Halbemond, Norden | (West Germany) Egon Muller | (West Germany) Georg Hack | (Poland) Zenon Plech |
| 9 May | (West Germany) Rhein-Main Arena, Diedenbergen | (Netherlands) Henny Kroeze | (Poland) Leonard Raba | (Czechoslovakia) Václav Verner |
| 9 May | (Hungary) Hajdú Volán Stadion, Debrecen | (Czechoslovakia) Aleš Dryml Sr. | (Soviet Union) Mikhail Starostin | (Hungary) Zoltan Hajdu |

=== American Final ===
- 12 June 1982
- (United States) Veterans Memorial Stadium, Long Beach
- First 3 to Overseas final plus 1 reserve

| Pos. | Rider | Heat Scores | Total |
|---|---|---|---|
| 1 | Dennis Sigalos | 3,3,3,3,3 | 15 |
| 2 | Shawn Moran | 2,2,3,3,3 | 13+3 |
| 3 | Kelly Moran | 3,2,2,3,3 | 13+2 |
| 4 | Scott Autrey | 3,3,3,2,2 | 13+1 |
| 5 | John Cook | 1,3,1,3,2 | 10 |
| 6 | Mike Faria | 2,1,2,2,3 | 10 |
| 7 | Bobby Schwartz | 3,3,1,X,1 | 8 |
| 8 | Mike Curosco | 0,2,3,1,1 | 7 |
| 9 | Brad Oxley | 2,1,0,1,2 | 6 |
| 10 | Alan Christian | 2,F,2,1,0 | 5 |
| 11 | Gene Woods | 1,0,2,E,1 | 4 |
| 12 | Mike Bast | X,2,1,0,0 | 3 |
| 13 | Steve Lucero | 1,0,0,2,0 | 3 |
| 14 | Dave Sims | 0,E,1,0,1 | 2 |
| 15 | Steve Gresham | 1,1,0,-,- | 2 |
| 16 | Paul Orlandi | 0,1,F,-,- | 1 |
| R1 | Keith Christo | 2,2 | 4 |
| R2 | John Sandona | 0,1,0 | 1 |

=== British Final ===
- 2 June 1982
- (England) Brandon Stadium, Coventry
- First 8 to Overseas Final plus 1 reserve

| Placing | Rider | Total | 1 | 2 | 3 | 4 | 5 | 6 | 7 | 8 | 9 | 10 | 11 | 12 | 13 | 14 | 15 | 16 | 17 | 18 | 19 | 20 | Pts | Pos | 21 |
|---|---|---|---|---|---|---|---|---|---|---|---|---|---|---|---|---|---|---|---|---|---|---|---|---|---|
| 1 | (England) (7) Andy Grahame | 14 | | 3 | | | | | 3 | | | | | 3 | 3 | | | | | 2 | | | 14 | 1 | |
| 2 | (England) (9) Alan Grahame | 13 | | | 3 | | 2 | | | | | | 2 | | | | | 3 | | 3 | | | 13 | 2 | |
| 3 | (England) (14) Kenny Carter | 12 | | | | 2 | | 3 | | | | | 3 | | 2 | | | | | | | 2 | 12 | 3 | |
| 4 | (England) (12) Phil Collins | 11 | | | 2 | | | | | 3 | | 2 | | | 1 | | | | | | 3 | | 11 | 4 | |
| 5 | (England) (16) Chris Morton | 10 | | | | 3 | | | | 1 | 3 | | | | | | 2 | | | 1 | | | 10 | 5 | |
| 6 | (England) (5) Peter Collins | 10 | | 2 | | | 3 | | | | | 3 | | | | | 1 | | | | | 1 | 10 | 6 | |
| 7 | (England) (4) Les Collins | 9 | 0 | | | | | | | 2 | | | | 2 | | | | 2 | | | | 3 | 9 | 7 | |
| 8 | (England) (10) Dave Jessup | 8 | | | E | | | 2 | | | | | | 0 | | | 3 | | 3 | | | | 8 | 8 | |
| 9 | (England) (2) Michael Lee | 7 | 3 | | | | | 1 | | | | 1 | | | | 2 | | | | 0 | | | 7 | 9 | |
| 10 | (England) (1) Paul Woods | 6 | 2 | | | | 1 | | | | 1 | | | | 0 | | | | 2 | | | | 6 | 10 | |
| 11 | (Zimbabwe) (6) Mike Ferreira | 6 | | 1 | | | | 0 | | | 2 | | | | | | | 1 | | | 2 | | 6 | 11 | |
| 12 | (England) (13) John Davis | 5 | | | | 0 | 0 | | | | | | | 1 | | 3 | | | | | 1 | | 5 | 12 | |
| 13 | (England) (15) Simon Wigg | 4 | | | | 1 | | | 2 | | | 0 | | | | | | 0 | 1 | | | | 4 | 13 | |
| 14 | (England) (11) Malcolm Holloway | 3 | | | 1 | | | | 1 | | 0 | | | | | 1 | | | | | | 0 | 3 | 14 | |
| 15 | (England) (3) Kevin Jolly | 2 | 1 | | | | | | 0 | | | | 1 | | | | 0 | | | | 0 | | 2 | 15 | |
| 16 | (England) (8) John Louis | 0 | | 0 | | | | | | 0 | | | 0 | | | E | | | E | | | | 0 | 16 | |
| Placing | Rider | Total | 1 | 2 | 3 | 4 | 5 | 6 | 7 | 8 | 9 | 10 | 11 | 12 | 13 | 14 | 15 | 16 | 17 | 18 | 19 | 20 | Pts | Pos | 21 |

m - exclusion for exceeding two minute time allowance • t - exclusion for touching the tapes • x - other exclusion • e - retired or mechanical failure • f - fell • ns - non-starter • nc - non-classify

| gate A - inside | gate B | gate C | gate D - outside |

=== Australian Final ===
- 13 March 1982
- (Australia) Exhibition Ground, Brisbane
- Top 2 to Overseas final

| Pos. | Rider | Heat Scores | Total |
|---|---|---|---|
| 1 | Billy Sanders | 3,3,3,3,3 | 15 |
| 2 | Phil Crump | 3,3,3,3,2 | 14 |
| 3 | Gary Guglielmi | 1,3,3,3,1 | 11 |
| 4 | Steve Regeling | 2,2,1,3,3 | 11 |
| 5 | John Titman | 3,2,2,2,2 | 11 |
| 6 | Ron Schleib | 1,3,2,1,3 | 10 |
| 7 | Phil Herne | 2,2,3,2,1 | 10 |
| 8 | Neil Coddington | 3,1,2,0,2 | 8 |
| 9 | Glyn Taylor | 2,1,1,2,X | 6 |
| 10 | Peter Byrne | 1,0,0,0,3 | 4 |
| 11 | Les Sawyers | 2,X,0,2,0 | 4 |
| 12 | Mark Johns | 0,1,0,1,2 | 4 |
| 13 | Graeme Robertson | 0,2,0,1,1 | 4 |
| 14 | David Foot | 1,1,1,0,1 | 4 |
| 15 | Steve Baker | 0,0,2,0,0 | 2 |
| 16 | Peter Carswell | 0,0,1,1,0 | 2 |

=== New Zealand Final ===
- 27 February 1982
- (New Zealand) Ruapuna Speedway, Christchurch
- Top 2 to Overseas final

| Pos. | Rider | Total |
|---|---|---|
| 1 | Larry Ross | 15 |
| 2 | Ivan Mauger | 14 |
| 3 | Mitch Shirra | 13 |
| 4 | David Bargh | 12 |
| 5 | Alan Mason | 11 |
| 6 | Roger Wright | 10 |
| 7 | Max Brown | 9 |
| 8 | Greame Stapleton | 8 |
| 9 | Kevin Browne | 6 |
| 10 | Trevor Chapman | 5 |
| 11 | Graham Taylor | 4 |
| 12 | Greg Joynt | 4 |
| 13 | Gavin Rhodes | 4 |
| 14 | Lance Begbie | 2 |
| 15 | Steve Hann | 1 |
| 16 | Vayne Brown | 0 |
| R1 | Philip McClintock | 2 |
| R2 | Craig Blacket | 0 |

=== Danish Final ===
- 11 May 1982
- (Denmark) Fredericia Speedway Stadium, Fredericia
- First 6 to Nordic final

| Pos. | Rider | Total |
|---|---|---|
| 1 | Erik Gundersen | 13+3 |
| 2 | Bo Petersen | 13+2 |
| 3 | Hans Nielsen | 13+1 |
| 4 | Ole Olsen | 11 |
| 5 | Preben Eriksen | 10 |
| 6 | Tommy Knudsen | 10 |
| 7 | Finn Thomsen | 9 |
| 8 | Bent Rasmussen | 8 |
| 9 | Jens Rasmussen | 7 |
| 10 | Alf Busk | 7 |
| 11 | Finn Rune Jensen | 5 |
| 12 | Helge R. Hansen | 4 |
| 13 | Jens Henry Nielsen | 4 |
| 14 | John Eskildsen | 3 |
| 15 | Hans Albert Klinge | 3 |
| 16 | Rene Christiansen | 0 |

=== Norway Final ===
- (Norway) Geiteryggen Speedwaybane, Skien
- 9 May 1982, top 2 to Nordic final

| Pos. | Rider | Points |
|---|---|---|
| 1 | Dag Haaland | 14 |
| 2 | Roy Otto | 13 |
| 3 | Trond Helge Skretting | 12 |
| 4 | Sigvart Pedersen | 11 |
| 5 | Asgeir Berga | 11 |
| 6 | Geir Aasland | 10 |
| 7 | Kjell Gimre | 8 |
| 8 | Lars Otto Holt | 7 |
| 9 | Terje Tollefsen | 7 |
| 10 | Roar Rockvaldsen | 6 |
| 11 | Jörn Haugvaldstad | |

=== Finland Final ===
- (Finland) Eteläpuisto, Tampere
- 10 September 1981, top 2 (+1 seeded rider) to 1982 Nordic final

| Pos. | Rider | Total |
|---|---|---|
| 1 | Kai Niemi | 15 |
| 2 | Pekka Hautamaki | 14 |
| 3 | Veijo Tuoriniemi | 12 |
| 4 | Olli Turkia | 11 |
| 5 | Seppo Palomaki | 10 |
| 6 | Ossi Henriksson | 10 |
| 7 | Hannu Lehtonen | 9 |
| 8 | Isto Maja | 7 |
| 9 | Hannu Larronmaa (res) | 7 |
| 10 | Ari Koponen | 5 |
| 11 | Seppo Keskinen | 5 |
| 12 | Ismo Kivela | 4 |
| 13 | Heikki Makinen | 4 |
| 14 | Markku Parkkari | 1 |
| 15 | Esa Jamsalainen | 1 |
| 16 | Risto Jokinen (res) | 1 |
| 17 | Esa Mattila | 0 |
| 18 | Pentti Kallio | 0 |
| 19 | Kari Yrjanainen (res) | 0 |

=== Swedish finals ===
- (Sweden) Top 4 over three meetings + Jan Andersson (seeded) to Nordic final
- R1 (25 May, Gamla Målilla Motorstadion, Målilla)
- R2 (26 May, Gubbängens IP, Stockholm)
- R3 (27 May, Grevby Motorstadion, Mariestad)

| Pos. | Rider | R1 | R2 | R3 | Total |
|---|---|---|---|---|---|
| 1 | Richard Hellsén | 13 | 13 | 11 | 37 |
| 2 | Tommy Nilsson | 10 | 13 | 13 | 36 |
| 3 | Björn Andersson | 9 | 12 | 11 | 32 |
| 4 | Lillebror Johansson | 10 | 8 | 12 | 31+3 |
| 5 | Lennart Bengsson | 13 | 8 | 10 | 31+2 |
| 6 | Uno Johansson | 11 | 7 | 12 | 30 |
| 7 | Anders Michanek | 7 | 8 | 12 | 27 |
| 8 | Jan Ericsson | 9 | 9 | 8 | 26 |
| 9 | Hans Danielsson | 6 | 6 | 7 | 19 |
| 10 | Conny Samuelsson | 7 | 5 | 4 | 16 |
| 11 | Åke Fridell | 4 | 10 | 1 | 15 |
| 12 | Roger Gustavsson | 6 | 1 | 7 | 14 |
| 13 | Anders Eriksson | 9 | 2 | 2 | 13 |
| 14 | Börje Ring | 2 | 5 | 5 | 12 |
| 15 | Per-Ove Gudmundsson | 0 | 5 | 4 | 9 |
| 16 | Pierre Brannefors | 8 | 0 | 0 | 8 |
| 17 | Gert Carlsson | 0 | 4 | - | 4 |
| 18 | Sören Brolin | 0 | 0 | - | 0 |
| 19 | Tommy Johansson | 0 | - | - | 0 |

== Fourth round ==
=== Continental semi-finals ===
- 13 July
- (West Germany) Abensberger Stadion, Abensberg
- Top 8 to Continental final

| Pos. | Rider | Points |
|---|---|---|
| 1 | (Poland) Viktor Kuznetsov | 12+3 |
| 2 | (Poland) Marek Kepa | 12+2 |
| 3 | (Soviet Union) Rif Saitgareev | 11 |
| 4 | (Czechoslovakia) Václav Verner | 10 |
| 5 | (Netherlands) Henny Kroeze | 10 |
| 6 | (West Germany) Georg Hack | 10 |
| 7 | (Poland) Leonard Raba | 9 |
| 8 | (Czechoslovakia) Jindrich Dominik | 8 |
| 9 | (West Germany) Christian Brandt | 7 |
| 10 | (Poland) Wojciech Zabialowicz | 6 |
| 11 | (Czechoslovakia) Petr Kucera | 6 |
| 12 | (Soviet Union) Anatolij Maxsimov | 5 |
| 13 | (West Germany) Alois Wiesböck | 4 |
| 14 | (Poland) Zenon Plech | 4 |
| 15 | (Poland) Alfred Siekierka | 3 |
| 16 | (West Germany) Egon Müller | 0 |

- 13 July
- (Italy) Santa Marina Stadium, Lonigo
- Top 8 to Continental final

| Pos. | Rider | Points |
|---|---|---|
| 1 | (Soviet Union) Valerij Gordeev | 13 |
| 2 | (Italy) Francesco Biginato | 12 |
| 3 | (Czechoslovakia) Jiří Štancl | 11 |
| 4 | (Czechoslovakia) Aleš Dryml Sr. | 11 |
| 5 | (Poland) Edward Jancarz | 11 |
| 6 | (Soviet Union) Michail Starostin | 10 |
| 7 | (Italy) Gianni Famari | 9 |
| 8 | (West Germany) Josef Aigner | 8+3 |
| 9 | (Czechoslovakia) Emil Sova | 8+2 |
| 10 | (Poland) Roman Jankowski | 8+1 |
| 11 | (Hungary) Istvan Sziracky | 4 |
| 12 | (West Germany) George Gilgenreiner | 4 |
| 13 | (Hungary) Ferenc Farkas | 2 |
| 14 | (West Germany) Karl Maier | 2 |
| 15 | (Soviet Union) Piotr Belajev (res) | 2 |
| 16 | (Hungary) Zoltan Hajdu | 1 |
| 17 | (Hungary) Zoltán Adorján | 1 |
| 18 | (West Germany) Christoph Betzl (res) | 1 |

=== Overseas Final ===
- 4 July 1982
- (England) White City Stadium, London
- First 10 to Intercontinental final plus 1 reserve

| Placing | Rider | Total | 1 | 2 | 3 | 4 | 5 | 6 | 7 | 8 | 9 | 10 | 11 | 12 | 13 | 14 | 15 | 16 | 17 | 18 | 19 | 20 | Pts | Pos | 21 |
|---|---|---|---|---|---|---|---|---|---|---|---|---|---|---|---|---|---|---|---|---|---|---|---|---|---|
| 1 | (England) (2) Dave Jessup | 13 | 2 | | | | | 3 | | | | 3 | | | | 3 | | | | 2 | | | 13 | 1 | |
| 2 | (England) (16) Kenny Carter | 12 | | | | 1 | | | | 2 | 3 | | | | | | 3 | | | 3 | | | 12 | 2 | |
| 3 | (United States) (12) Bruce Penhall | 11 | | | 3 | | | | | 3 | | 2 | | | 3 | | | | | | 0 | | 11 | 3 | |
| 4 | (New Zealand) (10) Larry Ross | 10 | | | 2 | | | 1 | | | | | | 3 | | | 1 | | 3 | | | | 10 | 4 | |
| 5 | (England) (8) Andy Grahame | 8 | | 1 | | | | | | 1 | | | 2 | | | 3 | | | 1 | | | | 8 | 5 | |
| 6 | (United States) (13) Kelly Moran | 8 | | | | 2 | 1 | | | | | | | 1 | | 2 | | | | | 2 | | 8 | 6 | |
| 7 | (United States) (3) Dennis Sigalos | 8 | 0 | | | | | | 3 | | | | 0 | | | | 2 | | | | 3 | | 8 | 7 | |
| 8 | (Australia) (14) Phil Crump | 8 | | | | 0 | | 2 | | | | | 3 | | 0 | | | | | | | 3 | 8 | 8 | |
| 9 | (England) (5) Les Collins | 7 | | 3 | | | 2 | | | | | 1 | | | | | 0 | | | | | 1 | 7 | 9 | 3 |
| 10 | (England) (1) Peter Collins | 7 | 3 | | | | 0 | | | | 0 | | | | 2 | | | | 2 | | | | 7 | 10 | 2 |
| 11 | (United States) (6) Shawn Moran | 7 | | 2 | | | | 0 | | | 1 | | | | | | | 3 | | | 1 | | 7 | 11 | 1 |
| 12 | (England) (9) Alan Grahame | 6 | | | 1 | | 3 | | | | | | 1 | | | | | 0 | | 1 | | | 6 | 12 | |
| 13 | (New Zealand) (11) Ivan Mauger | 6 | | | 0 | | | | 2 | | 2 | | | | | 0 | | | | | | 2 | 6 | 13 | |
| 14 | (Australia) (15) Billy Sanders | 5 | | | | 3 | | | 1 | | | 0 | | | | | | 1 | 0 | | | | 5 | 14 | |
| 15 | (England) (4) Chris Morton | 5 | 1 | | | | | | | 0 | | | | 2 | | | | 2 | | | | 0 | 5 | 15 | |
| 16 | (England) (7) Phil Collins | 1 | | 0 | | | | | 0 | | | | | 0 | 1 | | | | | 0 | | | 1 | 16 | |
| R1 | (England) (R1) Michael Lee | 0 | | | | | | | | | | | | | | | | | | | | | 0 | R1 | |
| R2 | (United States) (R2) Scott Autrey | 0 | | | | | | | | | | | | | | | | | | | | | 0 | R2 | |
| R3 | (Australia) (R3) Gary Guglielmi | 0 | | | | | | | | | | | | | | | | | | | | | 0 | R3 | |
| R4 | (New Zealand) (R4) Mitch Shirra | 0 | | | | | | | | | | | | | | | | | | | | | 0 | R4 | |
| Placing | Rider | Total | 1 | 2 | 3 | 4 | 5 | 6 | 7 | 8 | 9 | 10 | 11 | 12 | 13 | 14 | 15 | 16 | 17 | 18 | 19 | 20 | Pts | Pos | 21 |

m - exclusion for exceeding two minute time allowance • t - exclusion for touching the tapes • x - other exclusion • e - retired or mechanical failure • f - fell • ns - non-starter • nc - non-classify

| gate A - inside | gate B | gate C | gate D - outside |

=== Nordic Final ===
- 4 July 1982
- (Denmark) Fjelsted Speedway Stadium, Harndrup
- First 6 to Intercontinental final + 1 reserve

| Pos. | Rider | Total |
|---|---|---|
| 1 | (Denmark) Hans Nielsen | 12+3 |
| 2 | (Denmark) Erik Gundersen | 12+2 |
| 3 | (Denmark) Bo Petersen | 11+3 |
| 4 | (Finland) Kai Niemi | 11+2 |
| 5 | (Denmark) Ole Olsen | 11+1 |
| 6 | (Sweden) Jan Andersson | 10+3 |
| 7 | (Denmark) Tommy Knudsen | 10+2 |
| 8 | (Sweden) Richard Hellsen | 10+1 |
| 9 | (Denmark) Preben Eriksen | 10+0 |
| 10 | (Sweden) Lillebror Johansson | 6 |
| 11 | (Sweden) Bjorn Andersson | 5 |
| 12 | (Finland) Ari Koponen | 5 |
| 13 | (Sweden) Tommy Nilsson | 3 |
| 14 | (Finland) Pekka Hautamaki | 2 |
| 15 | (Norway) Dag Haaland | 1 |
| 16 | (Norway) Roy Otto | 1 |

== Fifth round ==
=== Continental Final ===
- 25 July 1982
- (Poland) Alfred Smoczyk Stadium, Leszno
- First 5 to World final plus 1 reserve

| Placing | Rider | Total | 1 | 2 | 3 | 4 | 5 | 6 | 7 | 8 | 9 | 10 | 11 | 12 | 13 | 14 | 15 | 16 | 17 | 18 | 19 | 20 | Pts | Pos | 21 |
|---|---|---|---|---|---|---|---|---|---|---|---|---|---|---|---|---|---|---|---|---|---|---|---|---|---|
| 1 | (Czechoslovakia) (1) Jiří Štancl | 15 | 3 | | | | 3 | | | | 3 | | | | 3 | | | | 3 | | | | 15 | 1 | |
| 2 | (Poland) (10) Edward Jancarz | 11 | | | 2 | | | 3 | | | | | | 3 | | | 1 | | 2 | | | | 11 | 2 | 3 |
| 3 | (Czechoslovakia) (5) Václav Verner | 11 | | 3 | | | 1 | | | | | 3 | | | | | 2 | | | | | 2 | 11 | 3 | 2 |
| 4 | (West Germany) (16) Georg Hack | 10 | | | | 1 | | | | 2 | 1 | | | | | | 3 | | | 3 | | | 10 | 4 | |
| 5 | (Soviet Union) (13) Mikhail Starostin | 9 | | | | 2 | 0 | | | | | | | 2 | | 2 | | | | | 3 | | 9 | 5 | 3 |
| 6 | (Czechoslovakia) (2) Emil Sova | 9 | 1 | | | | | 2 | | | | 1 | | | | 3 | | | | 2 | | | 9 | 6 | 2 |
| 7 | (Netherlands) (15) Henny Kroeze | 8 | | | | 3 | | | 0 | | | 2 | | | | | | 3 | 0 | | | | 8 | 7 | |
| 8 | (Czechoslovakia) (9) Aleš Dryml Sr. | 8 | | | 1 | | 2 | | | | | | 3 | | | | | 2 | | X | | | 8 | 8 | |
| 9 | (Soviet Union) (7) Valery Gordeev | 7 | | 2 | | | | | 3 | | | | | 0 | 2 | | | | | X | | | 7 | 9 | |
| 10 | (Soviet Union) (11) Viktor Kuznetsov | 7 | | | 0 | | | | 1 | | 2 | | | | | 1 | | | | | | 3 | 7 | 10 | |
| 11 | (Czechoslovakia) (4) Jiří Dominik | 7 | 2 | | | | | | | 3 | | | | 1 | | | | 1 | | | | E | 7 | 11 | |
| 12 | (Poland) (12) Marek Kepa | 6 | | | 3 | | | | | 0 | | 0 | | | 1 | | | | | | 2 | | 6 | 12 | |
| 13 | (Poland) (8) Leonard Raba | 4 | | 1 | | | | | | 1 | | | 1 | | | 0 | | | 1 | | | | 4 | 13 | |
| 14 | (Italy) (3) Francesco Biginato | 3 | 0 | | | | | | 2 | | | | 0 | | | | 0 | | | | 1 | | 3 | 14 | |
| 15 | (Soviet Union) (14) Rif Saitgareev | 3 | | | | 0 | | 0 | | | | | 2 | | 0 | | | | | | | 1 | 3 | 15 | |
| 16 | (Italy) (6) Gianni Famari | 1 | | 0 | | | | 1 | | | 0 | | | | | | | E | | | 0 | | 1 | 16 | |
| R1 | (West Germany) (R1) Christian Brandt | 0 | | | | | | | | | | | | | | | | | | | | | 0 | R1 | |
| R2 | (Poland) (R2) Roman Jankowski | 0 | | | | | | | | | | | | | | | | | | | | | 0 | R2 | |
| R3 | (Poland) (R3) Wojciech Żabiałowicz | 0 | | | | | | | | | | | | | | | | | | | | | 0 | R3 | |
| Placing | Rider | Total | 1 | 2 | 3 | 4 | 5 | 6 | 7 | 8 | 9 | 10 | 11 | 12 | 13 | 14 | 15 | 16 | 17 | 18 | 19 | 20 | Pts | Pos | 21 |

m - exclusion for exceeding two minute time allowance • t - exclusion for touching the tapes • x - other exclusion • e - retired or mechanical failure • f - fell • ns - non-starter • nc - non-classify

| gate A - inside | gate B | gate C | gate D - outside |

=== Intercontinental Final ===
- 23 July 1982
- (Sweden) Vetlanda Motorstadion, Vetlanda
- First 11 to World final plus 1 reserve

| Placing | Rider | Total | 1 | 2 | 3 | 4 | 5 | 6 | 7 | 8 | 9 | 10 | 11 | 12 | 13 | 14 | 15 | 16 | 17 | 18 | 19 | 20 | Pts | Pos | 21 |
|---|---|---|---|---|---|---|---|---|---|---|---|---|---|---|---|---|---|---|---|---|---|---|---|---|---|
| 1 | (England) (7) Les Collins | 12 | | 3 | | | | | 2 | | | | | 3 | 3 | | | | | 1 | | | 12 | 1 | |
| 2 | (England) (3) Kenny Carter | 11 | 2 | | | | | | 3 | | | | 2 | | | | 2 | | | | 2 | | 11 | 2 | |
| 3 | (United States) (8) Dennis Sigalos | 10 | | 2 | | | | | | 3 | | | 3 | | | 2 | | | 0 | | | | 10 | 3 | 3 |
| 4 | (Denmark) (1) Hans Nielsen | 10 | 3 | | | | 1 | | | | 2 | | | | 2 | | | | 2 | | | | 10 | 4 | 2 |
| 5 | (United States) (13) Kelly Moran | 9 | | | | 3 | 3 | | | | | | | 0 | | 3 | | | | | 0 | | 9 | 5 | |
| 6 | (United States) (10) Bruce Penhall | 9 | | | 3 | | | 3 | | | | | | 1 | | | 1 | | 1 | | | | 9 | 6 | |
| 7 | (England) (16) Dave Jessup | 8 | | | | 2 | | | | 0 | 3 | | | | | | 3 | | | 0 | | | 8 | 7 | |
| 8 | (Finland) (9) Kai Niemi | 7 | | | 0 | | 2 | | | | | | 0 | | | | | 3 | | 2 | | | 7 | 8 | |
| 9 | (Australia) (12) Phil Crump | 7 | | | 1 | | | | | 1 | | 3 | | | 1 | | | | | | 1 | | 7 | 9 | |
| 10 | (Sweden) (2) Jan Andersson | 7 | 1 | | | | | 1 | | | | 1 | | | | 1 | | | | 3 | | | 7 | 10 | |
| 11 | (England) (11) Peter Collins | 6 | | | 2 | | | | 1 | | 0 | | | | | 0 | | | | | | 3 | 6 | 11 | 3 |
| 12 | (England) (6) Andy Grahame | 6 | | 0 | | | | 0 | | | 1 | | | | | | | 2 | | | 3 | | 6 | 12 | 2 |
| 13 | (Denmark) (4) Bo Petersen | 6 | 0 | | | | | | | 2 | | | | 2 | | | | 0 | | | | 2 | 6 | 13 | 1 |
| 14 | (New Zealand) (15) Larry Ross | 5 | | | | 1 | | | 0 | | | 0 | | | | | | 1 | 3 | | | | 5 | 14 | |
| 15 | (Denmark) (14) Ole Olsen | 4 | | | | 0 | | 2 | | | | | 1 | | 0 | | | | | | | 1 | 4 | 15 | |
| 16 | (Denmark) (5) Erik Gundersen | 3 | | 1 | | | 0 | | | | | 2 | | | | | 0 | | | | | 0 | 3 | 16 | |
| R1 | (Denmark) (R1) Tommy Knudsen | 0 | | | | | | | | | | | | | | | | | | | | | 0 | R1 | |
| R2 | (United States) (R2) Shawn Moran | 0 | | | | | | | | | | | | | | | | | | | | | 0 | R2 | |
| Placing | Rider | Total | 1 | 2 | 3 | 4 | 5 | 6 | 7 | 8 | 9 | 10 | 11 | 12 | 13 | 14 | 15 | 16 | 17 | 18 | 19 | 20 | Pts | Pos | 21 |

m - exclusion for exceeding two minute time allowance • t - exclusion for touching the tapes • x - other exclusion • e - retired or mechanical failure • f - fell • ns - non-starter • nc - non-classify

| gate A - inside | gate B | gate C | gate D - outside |

== World Final ==
- 28 August 1982
- (United States) Memorial Coliseum, Los Angeles.
- Referee: ( (Norway) ) Torrie Kittlesen
- Attendance: 40,000 (approx)

| Placing | Rider | Total | 1 | 2 | 3 | 4 | 5 | 6 | 7 | 8 | 9 | 10 | 11 | 12 | 13 | 14 | 15 | 16 | 17 | 18 | 19 | 20 | Pts | Pos |
|---|---|---|---|---|---|---|---|---|---|---|---|---|---|---|---|---|---|---|---|---|---|---|---|---|
| 1 | (United States) (13) Bruce Penhall | 14 | | | | 2 | 3 | | | | | | | 3 | | 3 | | | | | 3 | | 14 | 1 |
| 2 | (England) (15) Les Collins | 13 | | | | 3 | | | 3 | | | 1 | | | | | | 3 | 3 | | | | 13 | 2 |
| 3 | (United States) (4) Dennis Sigalos | 12 | 3 | | | | | | | 2 | | | | 2 | | | | 2 | | | | 3 | 12 | 3 |
| 4 | (United States) (1) Kelly Moran | 11 | 2 | | | | 1 | | | | 3 | | | | 3 | | | | 2 | | | | 11 | 4 |
| 5 | (England) (8) Kenny Carter | 10 | | 3 | | | | | | 3 | | | 3 | | | Fx | | | 1 | | | | 10 | 5 |
| 6 | (England) (10) Dave Jessup | 8 | | | 3 | | | 2 | | | | | | 0 | | | 3 | | 0 | | | | 8 | 6 |
| 7 | (Denmark) (16) Hans Nielsen | 8 | | | | 1 | | | | 0 | 2 | | | | | | 2 | | | 3 | | | 8 | 7 |
| 8 | (Sweden) (5) Jan Andersson | 8 | | 1 | | | 2 | | | | | 2 | | | | | 1 | | | | | 2 | 8 | 8 |
| 9 | (Czech Republic) (12) Jiří Štancl | 7 | | | 0 | | | | | 1 | | 3 | | | 1 | | | | | | 2 | | 7 | 9 |
| 10 | (Poland) (7) Edward Jancarz | 7 | | 2 | | | | | 2 | | | | | 1 | 2 | | | | | 0 | | | 7 | 10 |
| 11 | (Germany) (9) Georg Hack | 6 | | | 2 | | 0 | | | | | | 2 | | | | | 1 | | 1 | | | 6 | 11 |
| 12 | (Finland) (14) Kai Niemi | 5 | | | | 0 | | 3 | | | | | 1 | | 0 | | | | | | | 1 | 5 | 12 |
| 13 | (England) (2) Peter Collins | 5 | 1 | | | | | 0 | | | | 0 | | | | 2 | | | | 2 | | | 5 | 13 |
| 14 | (Australia) (11) Phil Crump | 4 | | | 1 | | | | 1 | | 1 | | | | | 1 | | | | | | 0 | 4 | 14 |
| 15 | (Czech Republic) (6) Václav Verner | 2 | | 0 | | | | 1 | | | 0 | | | | | | | x | | | 1 | | 2 | 15 |
| 16 | (Soviet Union) (3) Mikhail Starostin | 0 | 0 | | | | | | 0 | | | | 0 | | | | 0 | | | | 0 | | 0 | 16 |
| | (Czech Republic) (17) Emil Sova | 0 | | | | | | | | | | | | | | | | | | | | | 0 | |
| | (England) (18) Andy Grahame | 0 | | | | | | | | | | | | | | | | | | | | | 0 | |
| Placing | Rider | Total | 1 | 2 | 3 | 4 | 5 | 6 | 7 | 8 | 9 | 10 | 11 | 12 | 13 | 14 | 15 | 16 | 17 | 18 | 19 | 20 | Pts | Pos |

m - exclusion for exceeding two minute time allowance • t - exclusion for touching the tapes • x - other exclusion • e - retired or mechanical failure • f - fell • ns - non-starter • nc - non-classify

| gate A - inside | gate B | gate C | gate D - outside |

== Television ==
During the meeting, scenes for an episode of the American television drama series CHiPs were filmed in the pits. One of the stars of CHiPs was World Champion Bruce Penhall who portrayed cadet–probationary officer Bruce Nelson. The episode centered on Nelson winning the World Final, with Penhall acting as Nelson in between races. Actual television coverage of the meeting was also used in the episode, with dubbed over commentary. The episode, which was episode 5 of season 6 ("Speedway Fever") aired in the USA on November 7, 1982, was Penhall's debut in the series.

Penhall later admitted that it felt strange having a bodyguard and having to do make up for shoots in between races, stating that he was nervous enough riding in the World Final in front of his home crowd without the pressure of a television acting debut.
