= 1977 National League season =

British motorcycle speedway season

- League: National League
- No. of competitors: 19
- Champions: Eastbourne Eagles
- Knockout Cup: Eastbourne Eagles
- Individual: Colin Richardson
- Pairs: Boston Barracudas
- Fours: Peterborough Panthers
- Highest average: Tom Owen
- Division/s above: 1977 British League

The 1977 National League was contested as the second division of Speedway in the United Kingdom.

== Summary ==
Newport had moved down from the British League. Their riders were transferred to Bristol Bulldogs but they acquired new riders and were renamed Newport Dragons. Paisley Lions dropped out so the league had 19 teams, the same as the previous season. Part way through the season, Coatbridge Tigers relocated and changed name to Glasgow Tigers after being kicked out of Cliftonhill.

Eastbourne Eagles won the National League title, completing a league and cup double. Eastbournes's star rider was Colin Richardson, who won the Riders' Championship and averaged 10.70 for the season. He was backed up by Mike Sampson, who also surpassed a 10 average and Dave Kennett (8.37 average) and a member of Eastbourne's 1971 winning team.

Joe Owen, the leading rider of 1976 had moved from champions Newcastle Diamonds to join British League side Hull Vikings. Newcastle were unable to compensate for the loss and finished in 6th place, despite Joe's brother Tom Owen finishing top of the averages.

== Final table ==
Pos	Team	PL	W	D	L	Pts
1	Eastbourne Eagles	36	29	0	7	58
2	Rye House Rockets	36	24	3	9	51
3	Ellesmere Port Gunners	36	22	2	12	46
4	Canterbury Crusaders	36	23	0	13	46
5	Peterborough Panthers	36	22	0	14	44
6	Newcastle Diamonds	36	21	1	14	43
7	Boston Barracudas	36	20	0	16	40
8	Mildenhall Fen Tigers	36	16	4	16	36
9	Teesside Tigers	36	17	1	18	35
10	Crayford Kestrels	36	17	0	19	34
11	Glasgow Tigers	36	16	0	20	32
12	Newport Dragons	36	16	0	20	32
13	Oxford Cheetahs	36	15	1	20	31
14	Scunthorpe Saints	36	15	1	20	31
15	Edinburgh Monarchs	36	15	0	21	30
16	Workington Comets	36	14	1	21	29
17	Weymouth Wizards	36	11	3	22	25
18	Berwick Bandits	36	11	1	24	23
19	Stoke Potters	36	9	0	27	18

== Fixtures and results ==
Home \ Away	BER	BOS	CAN	CRY	EAS	ED	EP	GLA	MIL	ND	NW	OX	PET	RH	SCU	STO	TEE	WEY	WOR
Berwick		47–31	36–42	44–34	31–47	43–35	36–42	37–41	39–39	41–37	42–36	44–34	54–24	35–43	38–40	46–31	51–27	40–38	47–31
Boston	60–17		53–25	47–31	42–36	52–26	45–32	48–28	54–24	41–37	44–34	58–20	41–36	38–40	57–21	46–32	49–29	45–33	46–32
Canterbury	59–19	41–37		43–34	41–37	57–21	42–35	50–27	49–29	47–31	45–32	50–28	40–38	52–26	44–33	45–33	58–20	57–21	46–31
Crayford	47–31	43–34	44–34		29–49	52–26	46–30	54–23	50–28	40–36	47–31	49–29	48–30	37–38	48–30	41–37	52–26	45–33	56–22
Eastbourne	62–16	57–20	49–29	51–26		49–29	49–29	60–18	61–17	52–26	59–19	53–25	54–24	51–27	57–21	59–19	59–19	54–24	63–15
Edinburgh	53–25	45–33	37–41	44–34	30–48		31–47	42–36	40–38	35–42	52–26	43–33	54–24	38–40	40–38	40–37	52–25	45–33	45–33
Ellesmere Port	47–31	40–37	44–34	51–24	43–35	45–33		48–30	39–39	42–36	61–17	46–32	36–42	50–28	43–35	41–37	55–23	43–35	44–34
Glasgow/Coatbridge	45–33	43–11	49–29	39–37	32–46	44–34	38–40		54–24	37–41	47–31	42–36	48–29	38–40	45–33	46–32	52–25	45–33	50–28
Mildenhall	64–14	43–35	42–35	45–33	38–40	48–30	39–39	50–28		45–32	43–34	44–34	34–44	42–36	44–34	46–32	52–26	45–33	37–41
Newcastle	53–25	50–28	47–31	48–30	39–37	45–33	46–32	50–28	51–27		52–26	47–31	56–22	36–42	53–25	43–35	38–40	43–34	59–18
Newport	49–29	40–37	34–44	41–37	36–42	46–32	43–35	59–19	44–34	50–28		41–31	45–33	42–36	48–30	42–35	59–19	43–34	46–32
Oxford	53–24	38–40	41–37	47–31	44–34	43–35	43–35	60–18	39–39	41–37	58–19		51–27	38–37	38–40	44–34	53–25	44–33	51–27
Peterborough	60–18	42–36	43–35	53–25	42–36	47–31	42–36	56–22	53–25	40–38	52–26	51–27		44–34	57–21	44–34	43–35	55–23	49–29
Rye House	63–14	38–40	43–35	45–33	31–47	56–22	39–38	44–34	46–32	44–34	59–19	45–30	49–29		51–27	49–29	50–28	49–29	56–22
Scunthorpe	53–25	42–35	47–31	49–29	33–45	32–46	29–49	40–37	44–34	30–47	51–27	40–37	22–56	39–39		40–38	49–29	42–36	58–20
Stoke	52–26	40.5–37.5	38–40	38–40	24–54	37–41	38–40	42–36	34–44	33–45	47–31	41–37	33–45	38–40	48–29		32–45	43.5–33.5	41–37
Teesside	41–36	46–31	35–43	42–36	40–38	40–38	35–43	41–37	42–26	42–35	45–33	40–38	49–29	39–39	51–27	44–34		44–34	47–31
Weymouth	47–31	34.5–43.5	49–29	40–38	37–41	41–37	40–36	38–40	38–40	39–39	45–33	41–37	41–37	39–39	53–25	35–43	46–32		39–39
Workington	46–32	48–30	44–34	41–36	37–41	48–29	40–37	41–37	45–33	31–45	49–29	43–35	46–32	35–43	34–44	54–23	50–28	34–44	

Legend: Blue = home team win; Yellow = draw; Red = away team win.

== Top five riders (league averages) ==
	Rider	Nat	Team	C.M.A.
1	Tom Owen	(England)	Newcastle	11.01
2	Colin Richardson	(England)	Eastbourne	10.70
3	Martin Yeates	(England)	Oxford	10.59
4	John Jackson	(England)	Ellesmere Port	10.22
5	Mike Sampson	(England)	Eastbourne	10.18

== National League Knockout Cup ==
The 1977 National League Knockout Cup was the tenth edition of the Knockout Cup for tier two teams. Eastbourne Eagles were the winners of the competition.

First round

Date	Team one	Score	Team two
03/04	Eastbourne	55–23	Canterbury
23/04	Canterbury	26–52	Eastbourne
14/04	Oxford	44–34	Rye House
17/04	Rye House	44–34	Oxford
22/04	Edinburgh	48–30	Scunthorpe
25/04	Scunthorpe	43–34	Edinburgh
02/06 replay	Oxford	45–32	Rye House
29/05 replay	Rye House	42–36	Oxford

Second round

Date	Team one	Score	Team two
15/05	Eastbourne	54–23	Crayford
03/05	Crayford	35–43	Eastbourne
22/05	Newcastle	49–29	Glasgow
29/04	Glasgow	47–30	Newcastle
17/05	Ellesmere Port	46–32	Workington
03/06	Workington	42–36	Ellesmere Port
12/06	Oxford	50–28	Newport
23/06	Newport	41–37	Oxford
28/05	Berwick	46–32	Teesside
02/06	Teesside	44–34	Berwick
27/05	Edinburgh	44–34	Stoke
21/05	Stoke	40–38	Edinburgh
22/05	Boston	43–34	Weymouth
24/05	Weymouth	35–43	Boston
20/05	Peterborough	44–34	Mildenhall
22/05	Mildenhall	38–40	Peterborough

Quarter-finals

Date	Team one	Score	Team two
10/07	Eastbourne	54–24	Newcastle
08/08	Newcastle	34–43	Eastbourne
26/07	Ellesmere Port	46½-31½	Oxford
14/07	Oxford	37–41	Ellesmere Port
25/06	Berwick	46–32	Edinburgh
15/07	Edinburgh	41–37	Berwick
17/07	Boston	45–33	Peterborough
01/07	Peterborough	40–38	Boston

Semi-finals

Date	Team one	Score	Team two
25/09	Eastbourne	57–21	Ellesmere Port
02/09	Ellesmere Port	50–28	Eastbourne
27/08	Berwick	45–33	Boston
19/08	Boston	38–40	Berwick

=== Final ===
First leg

8 October 1977

Berwick Bandits Willie Templeton 9 Graham Jones 9 Dave Gifford 7 Mike Hiftle 6 Wayne Brown 5 Robin Adlington 4 Colin Caffrey 1	41–37	Eastbourne Eagles Colin Richardson 13 Mike Sampson 11 Steve Naylor 7 Eric Dugard 5 Paul Woods 1 Roger Abel 0 Dave Kennett 0

Shielfield Park

Second leg

23 October 1977

Eastbourne Eagles Colin Richardson 12 Mike Sampson 11 Steve Naylor 9 Eric Dugard 9 Dave Kennett 7 Roger Abel 7 Paul Woods 6	61–16	Berwick Bandits Brendan Shilleto (guest) 6 Graham Jones 5 Willie Templeton 2 Mike Hiftle 2 Ian Darling 1 Dave Gifford 0 Colin Caffrey 0

Arlington Stadium

Eastbourne were declared Knockout Cup Champions, winning on aggregate 98–57.

== Riders' Championship ==
Colin Richardson won the Riders' Championship, sponsored by Gauloises and held at Wimbledon Stadium on 24 September.

Pos.	Rider	Pts	Total
1	(England) Colin Richardson	3 3 3 3 3	15
2	(England) Martin Yeates	3 3 2 3 2	13+3
3	(England) Tom Owen	3 3 3 3 1	13+2
4	(England) Kelvin Mullarkey	3 2 3 2 2	12
5	(England) Rob Hollingworth	2 3 1 2 3	11
6	(England) John Jackson	2 3 1 2 3	10
7	(Australia) Steve Koppe	1 2 1 2 3	9
8	(England) Laurie Etheridge	2 1 0 2 2	7
9	(Australia) Stuart Mountford	0 0 2 1 2	5
10	(Scotland) Bert Harkins	1 1 1 1 1	5
11	(England) Alan Emerson	0 0 0 1 3	4
12	(Australia) Danny Kennedy	0 2 2 0 ex	4
13	(Wales) Brian Woodward	2 0 1 1 0	4
14	(Scotland) Brian Collins	0 1 2 0 0	3
15	(England) Bob Coles	1 1 0 ef 0	3
16	(England) Steve Lawson	1 0 f 0 1	2
17	(England) Ian Clark (res)	0	0

- f=fell, r-retired, ex=excluded, ef=engine failure

== Pairs ==
The National League Pairs was held at Hyde Road on 4 June and was won by Boston Barracudas.

Group A
Pos	Team	Pts	Riders
1	Oxford	10	Yeates 9 Handley 1
2	Eastbourne	9	Richardson 5 Dugard 4
3	Weymouth	9	Kennedy 6 Harding 3
4	Mildenhall	8	Coles 7 Gibbons 1

Group B
Pos	Team	Pts	Riders
1	Canterbury	12	Koppe 6 Banks 6
2	Stoke	10	Mountford 6 Nunan 4
3	Workington	10	Lawson 8 Havelock 2
4	Berwick	4	Jones 3 Gifford 1

Group C
Pos	Team	Pts	Riders
1	Newport	13	Brett 8 Woodward 5
2	Ellesmere P	12	Jackson 9 Finch 3
3	Newcastle	8	Owen T 4 Henderson 4
4	Edinburgh	3	Millen 2 Harkins 1

Group D
Pos	Team	Pts	Riders
1	Boston	13	Hollingworth 8 Cook 5
2	Coatbridge	13	Collins B 8 Dawson 5
3	Peterborough	7	Clark I 5 Couzens 2
4	Teesside	2	Wilcock 2 Emerson 0

Semi finals

- Boston bt Canterbury
- Newport bt Oxford

Final

- Boston bt Newport

== Fours ==
Peterborough won the fours championship final, held at the East of England Arena on 7 August.

Semi finals

- SF1 = Eastbourne 21, Stoke 12, Ellesmere Port 8, Boston 7
- SF2 = Canterbury 18, Peterborough 14, Newcastle 9, Oxford 7

Final

Pos	Team	Pts	Riders
1	Peterborough Panthers	17	Clark I 6, Hawkins 5, Hines 5, Flatman 1, Clark B 0
2	Canterbury Crusaders	14	Banks 6, Koppe 3, Spelta 3, Kennett 2
3	Eastbourne Eagles	13	Richardson 5, Sampson 5, Dugard 2, Abel 1
4	Stoke Potters	4	Mountford 2, Nunan 1, Gledhill 1, Robertson 0

== Leading final averages ==
	Rider	Nat	Team	C.M.A.
1	Tom Owen	(England)	Newcastle	10.82
2	Colin Richardson	(England)	Eastbourne	10.63
3	Martin Yeates	(England)	Oxford	10.53
4	Mike Sampson	(England)	Eastbourne	10.09
5	John Jackson	(England)	Ellesmere Port	10.07

== Riders & final averages ==
Berwick

- Graham Jones 7.85
- Robin Adlington 7.01
- Mike Hiftle 6.65
- Willie Templeton 5.76
- Dave Gifford 5.69
- Terry Kelly 4.44
- Keith Williams 4.00
- Noel Suckling 3.86
- Wayne Brown 3.85
- Colin Caffrey 3.47

Boston

- Rob Hollingworth 9.90
- Carl Glover 7.84
- Colin Cook 7.68
- Paul Gilbert 7.04
- Steve Clarke 6.48
- Billy Burton 6.27
- Dave Piddock 5.75
- Dave Allen 5.45
- Stuart Cope 5.37
- Ron Cooper 5.25

Canterbury

- Steve Koppe 8.83
- Graham Banks 8.29
- Les Rumsey 8.18
- Bob Spelta 7.37
- Barney Kennett 6.44
- Brendan Shiletto 6.09
- Terry Casserley 5.55
- Graham Clifton 4.66
- Brian Canning 4.32

Coatbridge/Glasgow

- Brian Collins 8.94
- Mick McKeon 7.95
- Grahame Dawson 7.65
- Rob Maxfield 7.13
- Derek Richardson 5.41
- Merv Janke 4.75
- Benny Rourke 4.57
- Jimmy Gallacher 4.35
- Nicky Hollingworth 2.87

Crayford

- Laurie Etheridge 9.41
- Alan Sage 8.63
- Colin Gooddy 8.53
- Alan Johns 5.47
- John Hooper 4.63
- Mike Bessant 4.18
- Richard Davey 4.17
- Garry May 3.78

Eastbourne

- Colin Richardson 10.63
- Mike Sampson 10.09
- Dave Kennett 8.37
- Eric Dugard 8.25
- Peter Jarman 7.50
- Roger Abel 7.32
- Paul Woods 6.85
- Steve Naylor 6.63

Edinburgh

- Bert Harkins 8.09
- Jack Millen 7.80
- Charlie Monk 7.31
- Steve McDermott 6.37
- Dave Trownson 6.15
- Colin Farquharson 5.75
- Alan Bridgett 4.58
- Alan Morrison 4.48
- Des Allen 3.53

Ellesmere Port

- John Jackson 10.07
- Steve Finch 8.83
- Dave Mortiboys 7.43
- Phil Collins 7.23
- Duncan Meredith 5.64
- James Moore 4.93
- John Williams 4.90
- Louis Carr 4.03
- Paul Sheard 3.20

Mildenhall

- Bob Coles 8.81
- Trevor Jones 7.05
- Robert Henry 6.66
- Mike Spink 6.40
- Mick Bates 6.22
- Neil Leeks 5.83
- John Gibbons 5.66
- Fred Mills 5.64
- Melvyn Taylor 4.63

Newcastle

- Tom Owen 10.82
- Robbie Blackadder 8.61
- Ron Henderson 7.72
- Phil Kynman 7.22
- Robbie Gardner 6.35
- Neil Coddington .06
- Phil Micheledies 4.75
- Eddie Argall 4.43
- Rob Maxfield 2.78
- Robin Dixon 2.19
- Nigel Crabtree 1.47

Newport

- Jim Brett 8.84
- Brian Woodward 8.31
- John Goodall 7.61
- Mike Broadbank 6.52
- Cliff Anderson 5.26
- Chris Robins 5.18
- Malc Bedkober 5.00
- Dave Shepherd 2.88

Oxford

- Martin Yeates 10.53
- Phil Bass 7.13
- Kevin Young 6.82
- Colin Meredith 6.71
- Brian Leonard 6.53
- Mick Handley .6.00
- Malcolm Holloway 5.90
- Pip Lamb 4.99
- Gerald Smitherman 3.83
- Richie Caulwell 3.31

Peterborough

- Andy Hines 7.83
- Ian Clark 7.47
- Kevin Hawkins 7.37
- Nigel Flatman 7.00
- Brian Clark 6.99
- Nigel Couzens 6.46
- Ken Matthews 6.26
- Peter Spink 4.33

Rye House

- Kelvin Mullarkey 9.14
- Ted Hubbard 9.02
- Bobby Garrad 8.07
- Hugh Saunders 7.32
- Karl Fiala 6.22
- Ashley Pullen 6.11
- Peter Tarrant 6.00
- Bob Cooper 4.79

Scunthorpe

- Nicky Allott 8.29
- Arthur Browning 7.69
- John McNeill 7.22
- Sid Sheldrick 5.86
- Dave Baugh 5.76
- Trevor Whiting 5.09
- Paul Cooper 4.80
- Phil White 4.75
- Danny Young 4.21

Stoke

- Stuart Mountford 8.15
- Tim Nunan 7.3
- Ian Gledhill 6.67
- Carl Askew 6.49
- Ian Robertson 6.26
- Mick Fishwick 5.65
- Steve McDermott 5.29
- Rob Dole 4.50
- Colin Farquharson 4.11
- Ian Jeffcoate 3.86
- Trevor Vincent/Charley 3.37

Teesside

- Alan Emerson 8.56
- Steve Wilcock 6.84
- Pete Reading 6.16
- Pete Smith 6.09
- Nigel Close 5.14
- Martyn Cusworth 4.95
- John Robson 4.80
- Mike Beaumont 4.67
- Harry Maclean 2.56

Weymouth

- Danny Kennedy 8.65
- Vic Harding 7.95
- Malcolm Corradine 7.91
- Chris Robins 6.14
- Sean Willmott 5.65
- Rob Jones 5.59
- Geoff Swindells 5.27
- Richard Evans 5.24
- Chris Julian 4.77
- Roger Stratton 4.58

Workington

- Steve Lawson 8.19
- Brian Havelock 7.82
- Mick Newton 6.47
- Ian Hindle 6.37
- Roger Wright 5.61
- Colin Goad 5.49
- Terry Kelly 4.65
- Mark Dickinson 3.14
- Chris Bevan 3.04
- Andy Reid 3.04

== See also ==
- List of United Kingdom Speedway League Champions
- Knockout Cup (speedway)
