= 1977 British Speedway Championship =

Speedway event

- Venue: Brandon Stadium, Coventry
- Start date: 13 July 1977

The 1977 British Speedway Championship was the 17th edition of the British Speedway Championship. The Final took place on 13 July at Brandon Stadium in Coventry, England. The Championship was won by Michael Lee.

The British Under 21 Championship was won by Les Collins.

== British Final ==
- 13 July 1977
- (England) Brandon Stadium, Coventry

Placing	Rider	Total	1	2	3	4	5	6	7	8	9	10	11	12	13	14	15	16	17	18	19	20	Pts	Pos	21
1	(England) (6) Michael Lee	14		3				2			3							3			3		14	1	
2	(England) (8) Dave Jessup	13		1						3			3			3			3				13	2	
3	(England) (16) Doug Wyer	12				3				2	2						3			2			12	3	
4	(England) (2) John Davis	10	3					0				2				2				3			10	4	
5	(England) (5) Keith White	10		2			2					3					1					2	10	5	
6	(England) (3) Chris Morton	9	X						3				2				2				2		9	6	
7	(England) (14) Bob Kilby	9				2		3					0		3							1	9	7	
8	(England) (11) Gordon Kennett	8			3				1		0					1						3	8	8	
9	(England) (1) Terry Betts	8	2				3				1				1				1				8	9	
10	(England) (9) Alan Wilkinson	7			2		1						1					2		1			7	10	
11	(England) (15) John Louis	6				1			2			0						1	2				6	11	
12	(England) (10) Martin Ashby	5			1			1						3			0		0				5	12	
13	(England) (7) Barry Thomas	2		T					0					0	2					0			2	13	
14	(England) (12) David Gagen	2			0					1		1			0						0		2	14	
15	(England) (4) Neil Middleditch	2	1							0				1				0				0	2	15	
16	(England) (13) Malcolm Simmons	0				F	-							-		-					-		0	16	
R1	(England) (R1) Mick Bell	3		0										2							1		3	R1	
R2	(England) (R2) Frank Smith	0					F									0							0	R2	
Placing	Rider	Total	1	2	3	4	5	6	7	8	9	10	11	12	13	14	15	16	17	18	19	20	Pts	Pos	21

m - exclusion for exceeding two minute time allowance • t - exclusion for touching the tapes • x - other exclusion • e - retired or mechanical failure • f - fell • ns - non-starter • nc - non-classify

gate A - inside	gate B	gate C	gate D - outside

== British Under 21 final ==
- 25 June 1977, Kingsmead Stadium, Canterbury

Pos	Rider	Pts
1	Les Collins	15
2	Phil Collins	12
3	Colin Richardson	11
4	Brendan Shilleto	10
5	Ian Gledhill	10
6	Paul Gilbert	9
7	Ian Clark	8
8	Bob Garrad	8
9	Neil Leeks	8
10	Dave Allen	8
11	Steve Naylor	5
12	Kevin Young	5
13	Pete Smith	4
14	Nigel Close	3
15	Chris Bevan	2
16	Dave Johnson (res)	2
17	Kevin Brice	0

== See also ==
- British Speedway Championship
