= Gerald Smitherman =

English motorcycle racer (born 1952)

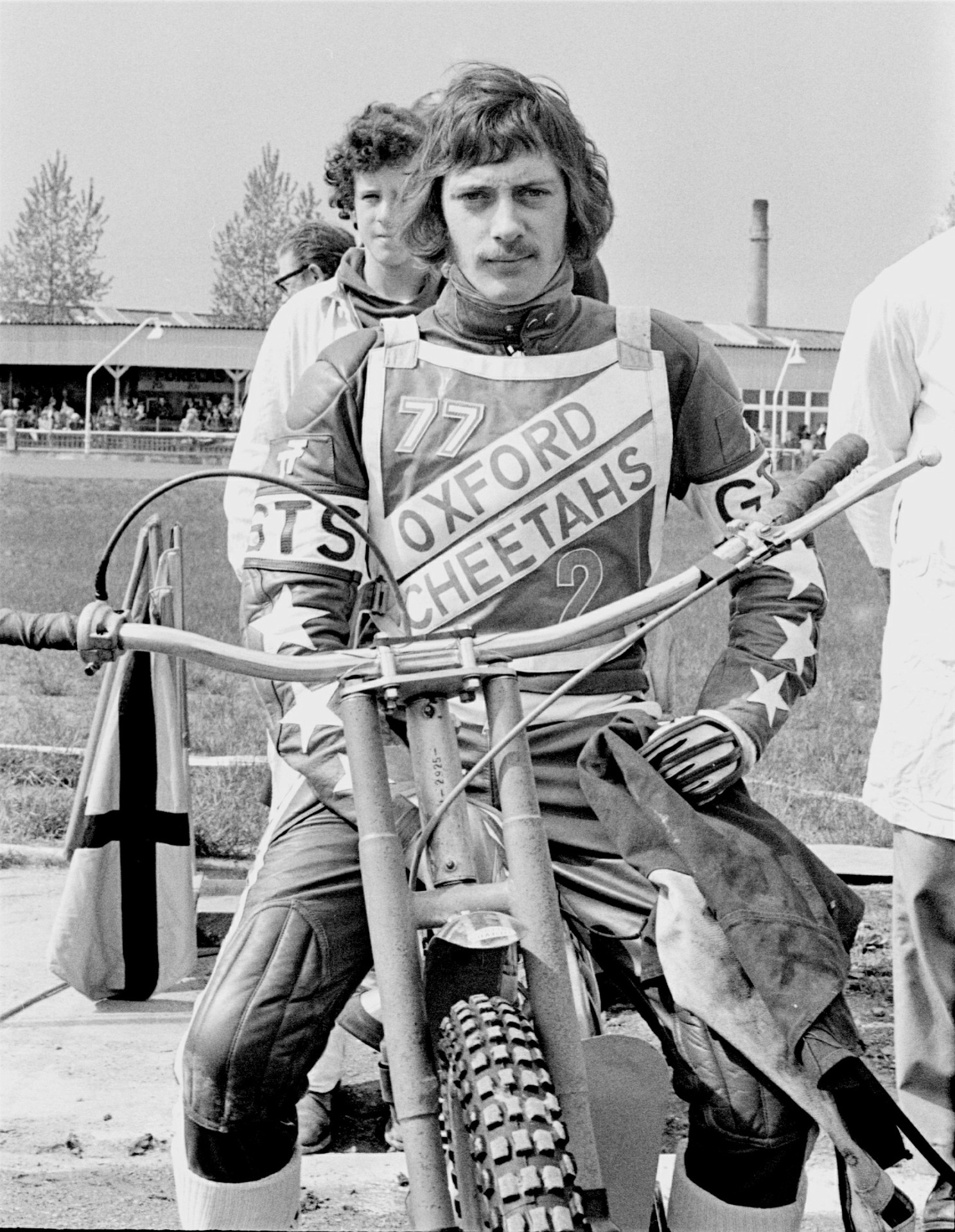
- Born: 24 June 1952 (age 74); Telford, England

Career history
- 1972: Cradley Heathens
- 1973-1976: Ellesmere Port Gunners
- 1977: Oxford Cheetahs

Gerald Smitherman (born 24 June 1952 in Telford, England) is a former motorcycle speedway rider from England.

== Career ==
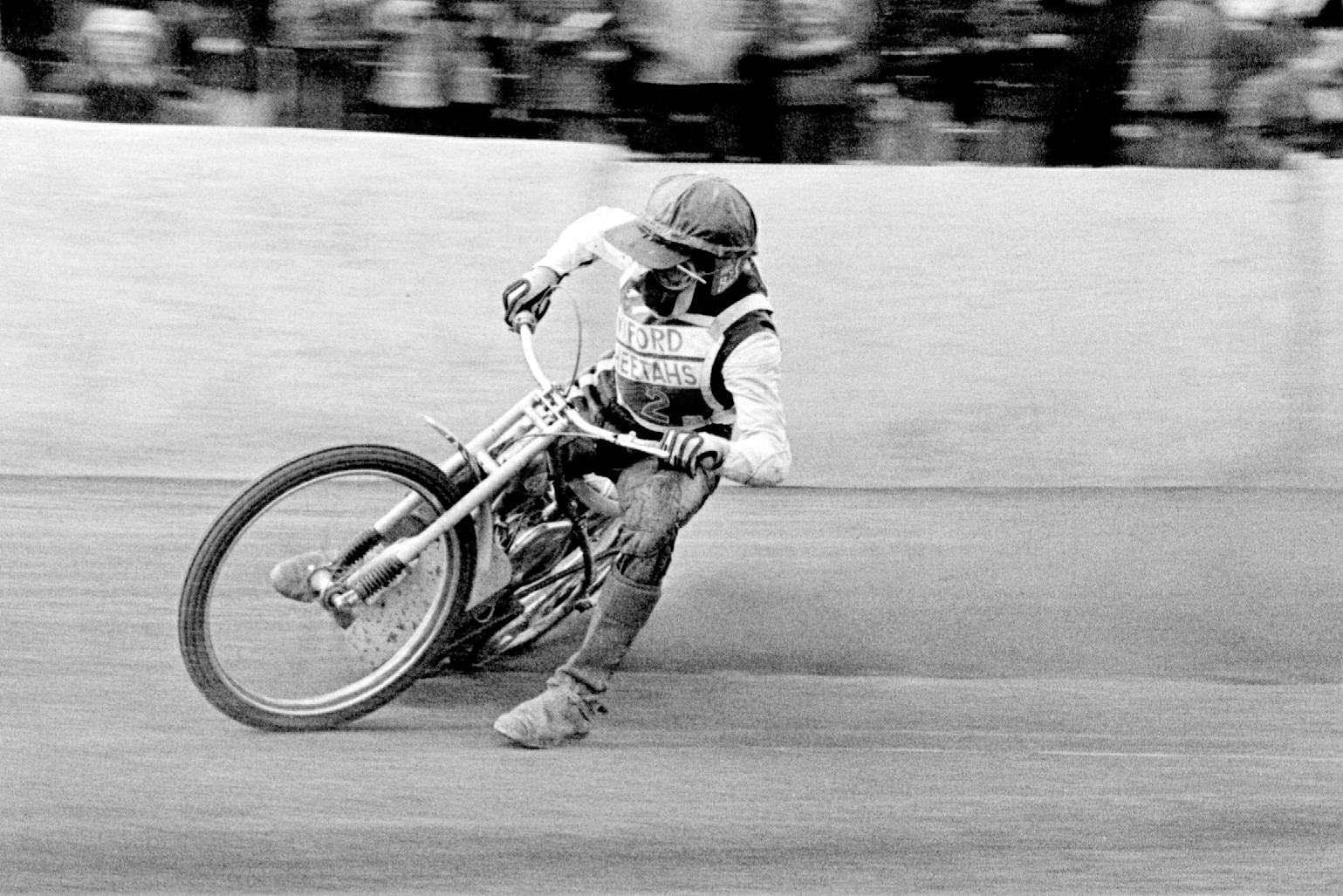
Gerald Smitherman racing for Oxford in 1977

The year 1972 saw Smitherman undertake the Cradley rider training school and compete in second half rides for the experience. During the 1972 British League season, Smitherman was thrown in the deep end due to injuries suffered by hs team and he represented Cradley Heathens.

Smitherman's career took off properly when he was signed for Ellesmere Port Gunners for the 1973 British League Division Two season. where he stayed for four years, returning decent averages in the middle ranks.

In his final year, Smitherman was signed over to Oxford Cheetahs to promoter Harry Bastable and competed for the Cheetahs during the 1977 National League season.

== After speedway ==
During his time as a rider, Smitherman had also made seats and continued with supplying accessories after retiring as GTS Products. For the 1991 World Speedway Final, he made the suits for Sam Ermolenko, Ronnie Corrie, Billy Hamill, Jan O. Pedersen and Per Jonson as well as pit crews. Married to Sherry, they have four daughters. Gerald took up squash, winning an Over-45 championship. He still follows speedway and provides accessories for today's riders as well as retro items.
