= Brian Clark (speedway rider) =

British motorcycle speedway rider

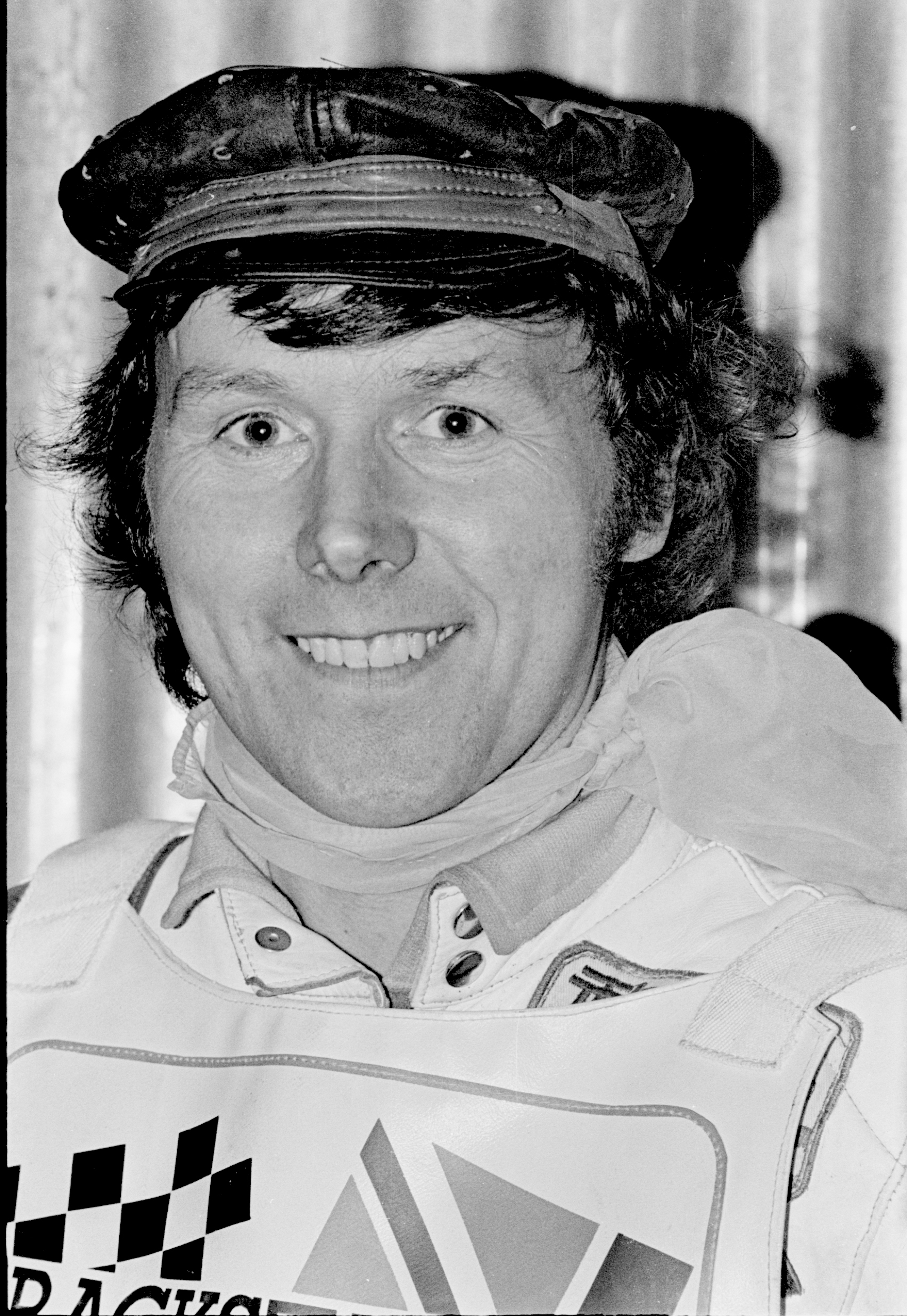
- Born: 18 March 1943 (age 83); Cheltenham, England
- Nationality: British (English)

Career history
- 1970–1979: Peterborough Panthers
- 1971: Oxford Cheetahs
- 1973–1975: Oxford Rebels
- 1973–1975: Cradley United
- 1976–1977: White City Rebels

Team honours
- 1977: fours championship

Brian Ashley Reader Clark (born 18 March 1943) is a former motorcycle speedway rider from England.

== Biography ==
Clark, born in Cheltenham, began his British leagues career riding a couple of times for Peterborough Panthers during the 1970 British League Division Two season.

Clark rode for ten consecutive years for Peterborough, becoming the club's leading rider and captain in 1975 and improving his season average to a high 9.37 during the 1976 National League season.

During his time at Peterborough, Clark won the fours championship in 1977, held at the East of England Arena on 7 August. He also rode for various other clubs in the top tier of speedway, notably for the Oxford Rebels / White City Rebels from 1975 to 1977.
