= Ashley Pullen =

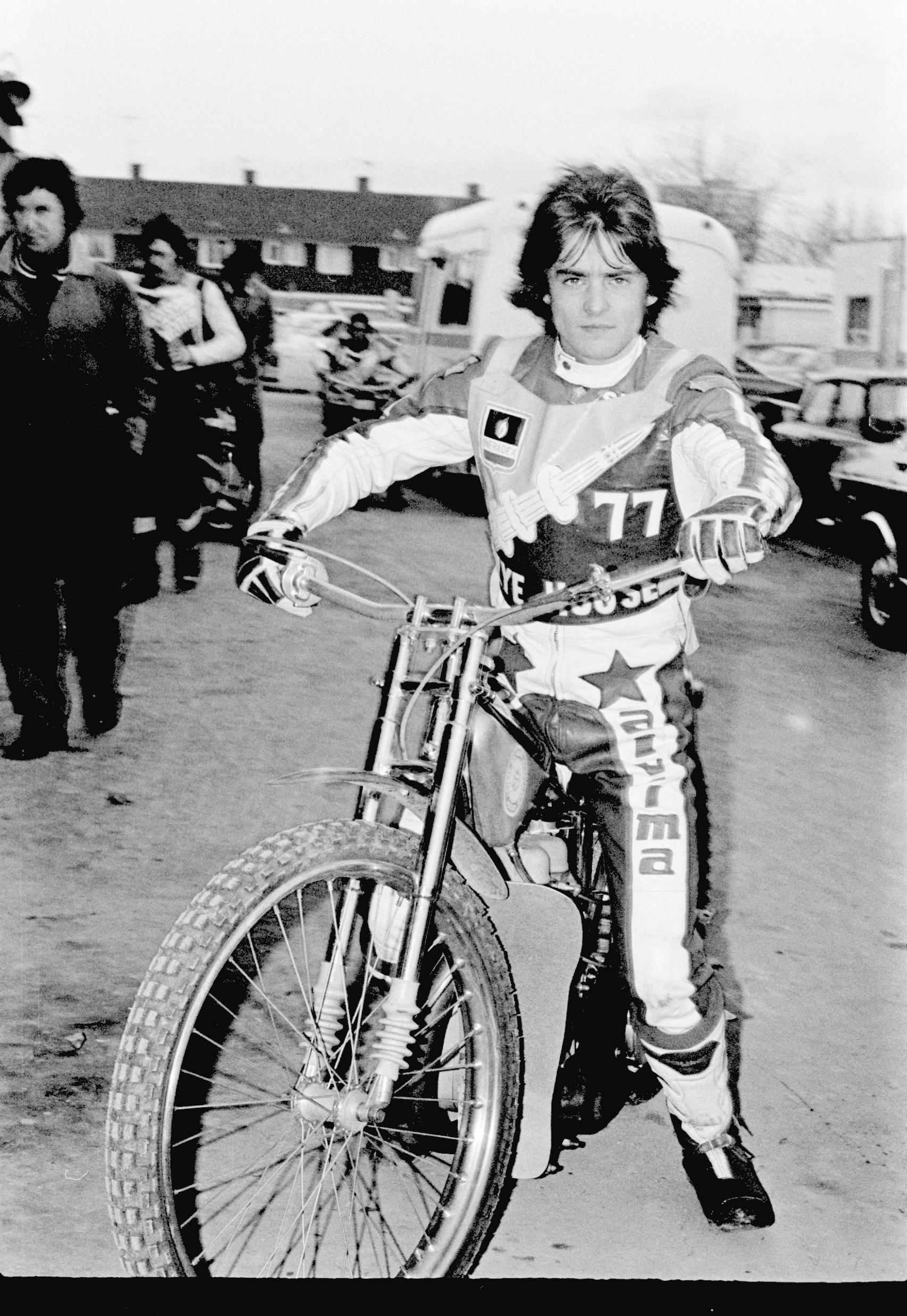
- Born: 18 February 1956; Oxford, England
- Died: 6 June 2002 (aged 46)
- Nationality: British (English)

Career history
- 1976–1980: Rye House Rockets
- 1978–1981, 1982: Reading Racers
- 1981–1982: Oxford Cheetahs
- 1982: Cradley Heathens
- 1983: Eastbourne Eagles
- 1983: Peterborough Panthers
- 1984: Stoke Potters
- 1985: Milton Keynes Knights

Team honours
- 1979: National League KO Cup Winner
- 1980: National League Champion

Ashley Lawrence Pullen (18 February 1956 – 6 June 2002) was a speedway rider from England.

== Career ==
Pullen born in Oxford, started his career in 1976, with Rye House Rockets in the National League. Pullen was a member of the Rye House team that completed the National League Championship and Knockout Cup double in 1980.

In 1981, Pullen rode a full season of top tier speedway with Reading Racers, during the 1981 British League season and moved from the reserve berth to the top five. He also first rode for Oxford Cheetahs in 1981. He enjoyed a full season with the Cheetahs during the 1982 National League season.

After riding for Peterborough Panthers in 1983, Pullen moved to Stoke Potters in 1984 before a final season at Milton Keynes Knights in 1985.

Pullen died from cancer in 2002.
