= Dave Trownson =

British motorcycle speedway rider

- Born: 28 February 1954 (age 72); Urmston, Greater Manchester
- Nationality: British (English)

Career history
- 1973–1974: Boston Barracudas
- 1974–1975: Berwick Bandits
- 1975–1980, 1984–1985: Wolverhampton Wolves
- 1976: Stoke Potters
- 1977–1987: Edinburgh Monarchs
- 1980, 1982–1983: Reading Racers
- 1981: Halifax Dukes
- 1988: Exeter Falcons

Team honours
- 1981: National League Knockout Cup Winner
- 1981: National League Fours Champion

Dave Trownson (born 28 February 1954) is a former motorcycle speedway rider from England.

== Biography ==
Trownson, born in Urmston, Greater Manchester, began his British leagues career riding a couple of times for Boston Barracudas during the 1973 British League Division Two season after being signed from Belle Vue Aces.

The following season, Trownson started riding for Boston reserves before securing a season-long loan deal with Berwick Bandits. He enjoyed his time at Berwick and did not want to return to Boston. After riding for Berwick in 1975 and making a few appearances for his new parent club Wolverhampton Wolves, he suffered a miserable 1976 season, struggling to gain selection and then breaking his arm.

Trownson began the 1977 National League season with Wolves but soon found a home at Edinburgh Monarchs, who had returned to speedway after a seven-year break.

Trownson not only became a regular with Edinburgh but soon emerged as fan's favourite, improving his season average for six consecutive years from 6.15 in 1977 to 9.21 in 1982. He was also part of the team that won the 1981 Knockout Cup and Fours championship final, held at the East of England Arena on 26 July 1981.

Trownson became the club's number 1 rider and would spend eleven years in total in Scotland until the end of the 1987 season.
