= Merv Janke =

Australian speedway rider

- Born: 7 November 1956 (age 70); Mount Morgan, Queensland, Australia
- Nationality: Australian

Career history
- 1977–1979: Glasgow Tigers
- 1979–1980, 1982: Halifax Dukes

Team honours
- 1980: Northern Trophy winner

Mervyn John Janke (born 7 November 1956) is an Australian former motorcycle speedway ride.

== Career ==
Janke started racing in the British leagues during the 1977 National League season, when riding for the Coatbridge/Glasgow Tigers. He improved significantly over the following seasons, topping the club's season averages in 1979, when recording 9.06.

In 1980, Janke joined Halifax Dukes in the top tier British League for the 1980 British League season, where he would stay until the end of the 1982 season.

Janke represented the Australia national speedway team on several occasions.
