= John McNeill (speedway rider) =

Australian speedway rider

- Born: 4 August 1955 (age 71); Melbourne, Victoria, Australia
- Nationality: Australian

Career history

Australia
- 1971: Victoria

Great Britain
- 1975–1976: Mildenhall Fen Tigers
- 1975, 1976: Newport
- 1976–1979: Leicester Lions
- 1977–1978: Scunthorpe Saints
- 1980: Hull Vikings
- 1980, 1982: Poole Pirates
- 1981: Swindon Robins
- 1981: Cradley Heathens
- 1982: Weymouth

Individual honours
- 1978: Victoria Champion

Team honours
- 1981: British League Champion

John Daniel McNeill (born 4 August 1955) is an Australian former motorcycle speedway rider.

== Speedway career ==
Born in Footscray, Victoria, McNeill took up motorcycle racing at Brooklyn Speedway, Melbourne in 1971. At the age of 16, he rode for the Victorian team touring Tasmania and broke the track speed record at Bendigo.

McNeill completed studies as an engineer before commencing his British speedway career four years later in 1975, signing with Mildenhall Fen Tigers for the New National League. After a three-month wait his big break came as several riders from Crewe Kings travelling together got lost travelling to the newly opened venue; McNeill was drafted quickly into the Crewe team as replacement winning two races and helping for an away team win. He became an overnight success, and being referred to as 'The Kid'. He also rode for Newport Wasps in the British League the same year.

After delaying his return to the UK in 1976 due to his father's ill health, McNeill arrived nearing the end of the season and rode for several teams without scoring a point. He signed for Leicester Lions in 1977, doubling up in the National League with Scunthorpe Saints, riding for both teams, he was a heat leader and top scorer for the Saint's until 1979 when he went full-time in the British League. In 1978, he won the Victoria State Championship and rode in three tests for Australasia at National League level, later representing the senior Australia team in test matches against England, and as a member of The Rest of The World team competing in America.

After breaking a leg in 1979, while riding as guest for Birmingham Brummies, McNeill bought himself out of his contract with Leicester Lions and in 1980 he moved on to Hull Vikings and then Poole Pirates, followed by a British League Championship-winning season with Cradley Heathens in 1981. His final season in British speedway was 1982, in which he rode for Weymouth. In 1983, McNeill spent a season in the Californian racing scene riding three times per week at Costa Mesa (Orange County fairground), Ventura, and San Bernardino, returning to Australia to place second in the Victorian Championship and qualifying for the national title. He sustained a serious back injury which ended his league career, but he returned to the track eighteen months later, and placed second in the Victorian Solo Championship, qualifying again for the national title (for the third time) where he finished in eighth place. He also then competed in further events in Australia, New Zealand, and San Francisco, and won the 'Drinksafe Motorcycle Individual' indoor event in Perth.

== After speedway ==
After retiring from the professional circuit, McNeill turned his hand to promoting speedway in Australia. He successfully promoted many international events at tracks such as the Melbourne Showgrounds, and the 'Mr Melbourne' meetings.

McNeill organised many top overseas riders and world champions to race in Australia during the 1980s and 1990s. His company 'Stadium Events Pty Ltd' conducted major events in Australia and New Zealand and staged an official Bi-Centennial event and the return of motorcycle racing at the Sydney Showgrounds in 1988. The company conducted events in Melbourne, Sydney and Perth, where they set a box office record in 1991 at the now defunct Burswood Dome of 31,031 people. The company also conducted International Supercross racing before focusing on equestrian events (Spirit of the Horse) and music.

McNeill currently resides at Collaroy Beach in Australia and is busy with several projects including the design of a bag free shopping system, Rubber Ties for bicycle carry racks and a self propelled snow ski unit for going up slopes where no lifts are available also rehearsing and playing guitar and singing in a Christian church band and at retirement villages in and around the Northern Beaches of Sydney.
