= Hans Danielsson =

Swedish speedway rider

- Born: 11 August 1958 (age 68); Gislaved, Sweden
- Nationality: Swedish

Career history

Sweden
- 1974-1982, 1984-1987: Lejonen
- 1983: Smederna

Great Britain
- 1978-1980: Wolverhampton Wolves
- 1981: Birmingham Brummies
- 1981: King's Lynn Stars

Individual honours
- 1980: Speedway World Championship reserve

Team honours
- 1978: Allsvenskan Div 2 Champion
- 1984: Allsvenskan Div 2 (South) Champion

Hans Danielsson also known as Hasse Danielsson (born 11 August 1958) is a former speedway rider from Sweden. He earned 15 caps for the Sweden national speedway team.

== Speedway career ==
Danielsson rode in the top tier of British Speedway from 1978 until 1981, riding for various clubs. He started his career at Wolverhampton Wolves from 1978 to 1980, although his 1980 season was delayed due to him completing his national service. He then rode for Birmingham Brummies and King's Lynn Stars in 1981.

Danielsson won the silver medal in 1981 and bronze medal in 1980 at the Swedish Championship.

Danielsson stood as reserve for the final of the Speedway World Championship in the 1980 Individual Speedway World Championship.
