= Rob Hollingworth =

British speedway rider

- Born: 31 December 1955 (age 70); Boston, Lincolnshire, England
- Nationality: British (English)

Career history
- 1973: Berwick Bandits
- 1974–1977, 1979–1982, 1984, 1986: Boston Barracudas
- 1975, 1979, 1982: King's Lynn Stars
- 1975–1978: Wolverhampton Wolves
- 1975, 1984: Poole Pirates
- 1976: White City Rebels
- 1978: Edinburgh Monarchs
- 1980–1981: Coventry Bees
- 1983: Scunthorpe Stags
- 1985: Mildenhall Fen Tigers

Team honours
- 1977: National League Pairs winner
- 1980: Midland League

Robert Hollingworth (born 31 December 1955) is a former motorcycle speedway rider from England.

== Career ==
Hollingworth started his British leagues career during the 1973 British League Division Two season, where he rode for Berwick Bandits. The following season, he joined Boston Barracudas and began to build his average over the next four years, culminating in an impressive 9.90 average during the 1977 National League season. He also secured the National League Pairs, partnering Colin Cook, during the 1977 National League season and rode for Wolverhampton Wolves in the highest league.

In 1978, Hollingsworth moved clubs joining Edinburgh Monarchs and although he finished top of the Scottish team's averages he experienced a moderate season and also struggled to perform for Wolves. He returned to Boston in 1979 and doubled up with King's Lynn Stars and then Coventry Bees in the British League. His form returned in Boston colours and he finished runner up in the 1980 National League Pairs Championship with Gary Guglielmi.

Hollingworth won the Lincolnshire Trophy on two occasions.

After a testimonial in 1984, Hollingsworth announced his retirement at the end of the season but changed his mind.

Hollingworth made further appearances, primarily in the Conference until 2003.
