= Ian Clark (speedway rider) =

British former motorcycle speedway rider

- Born: 23 December 1958 (age 67); Sandon, Essex, England
- Nationality: British (English)

Career history
- 1975-1979, 1985: Peterborough Panthers
- 1976: Cradley United
- 1976: Swindon Robins
- 1977: Birmingham Brummies
- 1977: White City Rebels
- 1980-1981: Leicester Lions
- 1981-1983: Hackney Hawks
- 1981-1982: Canterbury Crusaders
- 1983-1984: Oxford Cheetahs
- 1985: King's Lynn Stars
- 1986-1988: Milton Keynes Knights

Team honours
- 1977: National League Fours Champion

Ian Russell Clark (born 23 December 1958) is a British former motorcycle speedway rider.

== Career ==
Born in Sandon, Essex, Clark's early experience came in grasstrack, in which he was the British Schoolboy Champion in both 1973 and 1974. He took up speedway in 1973 at the training school at Hackney Wick, and made his competitive debut in 1975 for the Peterborough Panthers. During his five seasons with the Panthers, he was capped in the National League England team, and made several guest appearances in the British League.

In 1977, Clark helped the Peterborough Panthers win the Fours Championship during the 1977 National League season.

In 1980, Clark signed for British League Leicester Lions in a £2,750 transfer, reaching the semi-final of the World Championship the same year. In 1981, his performances were down on the previous year and he was sold to Hackney Hawks. In 1982, he primarily rode for Canterbury Crusaders, before spending two seasons with Oxford Cheetahs. He returned to Peterborough in 1985 before spending his final three seasons with Milton Keynes Knights. Clark still competes today in Grasstrack racing. He races in the GT140 class and in 2023, won the British GT140 Grasstrack Championship.
