= Robert Henry (speedway rider) =

- Born: 28 June 1954 (age 72); Exeter, England
- Nationality: British (English)

Career history
- 1976-1986: Mildenhall Fen Tigers
- 1976: Newport
- 1978: Swindon Robins
- 1979: Leicester Lions

Team honours
- 1979: National League Champions
- 1984: National League Fours winner

Robert Frank Henry (born 28 June 1954) is a former motorcycle speedway rider from England, who rode for Mildenhall Fen Tigers for eleven seasons, later going on to manage the team.

== Biography ==
Born in Exeter, Henry's first speedway races were in second-half events at Exeter Falcons in 1974.

In 1975, Henry moved on to Mildenhall Fen Tigers, and won the Suffolk Junior Open Championship. In 1976, he broke into the Mildenhall team and scored solidly, averaging close to five points per match, with one full maximum score. By 1979, he was established as one of Mildenhall's top riders, averaging close to nine points per match, and maintained consistently high scores for the team until his retirement in 1986. He was part of Mildenhall's National League winning team of 1979.

During his career, Henry also had a spell in the top flight British League, with Leicester Lions for whom he rode in nineteen matches in 1979. He was offered a place in the Leicester team in 1980 but decided to stay with Mildenhall.

In 1984, Henry helped the Mildenhall Fen Tigers win the Fours Championship during the 1984 National League season In 1985, he earned a testimonial meeting with Mildenhall and was the club captain at the time.

In 2011, Henry was appointed as team manager to the Fen Tigers, and went on to win the National League Knock Out Cup in his first season in charge.
