= Ian Gledhill =

British speedway rider

- Born: 12 August 1958; Diggle, Greater Manchester, England
- Died: 10 October 2015 (aged 57)
- Nationality: British (English)

Career history
- 1976–1978, 1981: Reading Racers
- 1976: Eastbourne Eagles
- 1977–1979: Stoke Potters
- 1979: Birmingham Brummies
- 1979, 1982: Cradley Heathens
- 1979: Wolverhampton Wolves
- 1979: Wimbledon Dons
- 1979: Hackney Hawks
- 1980–1981: Mildenhall Fen Tigers
- 1982: Oxford Cheetahs

Individual honours
- 1979: National League Riders' Champion

Team honours
- 1977: Spring Gold Cup Winner

Ian Gledhill (1958–2015) was a speedway rider from England.

== Speedway career ==
Gledhill rode in the top two tiers of British Speedway from 1976 to 1982, riding for various clubs. He began his career with Reading Racers from 1976 to 1978.

In 1979, Gledhill won the National League Riders' Champion, held at Wimbledon Stadium on 29 September.
