= Pete Smith (speedway rider, born 1957) =

British former motorcycle speedway rider (born 1957)

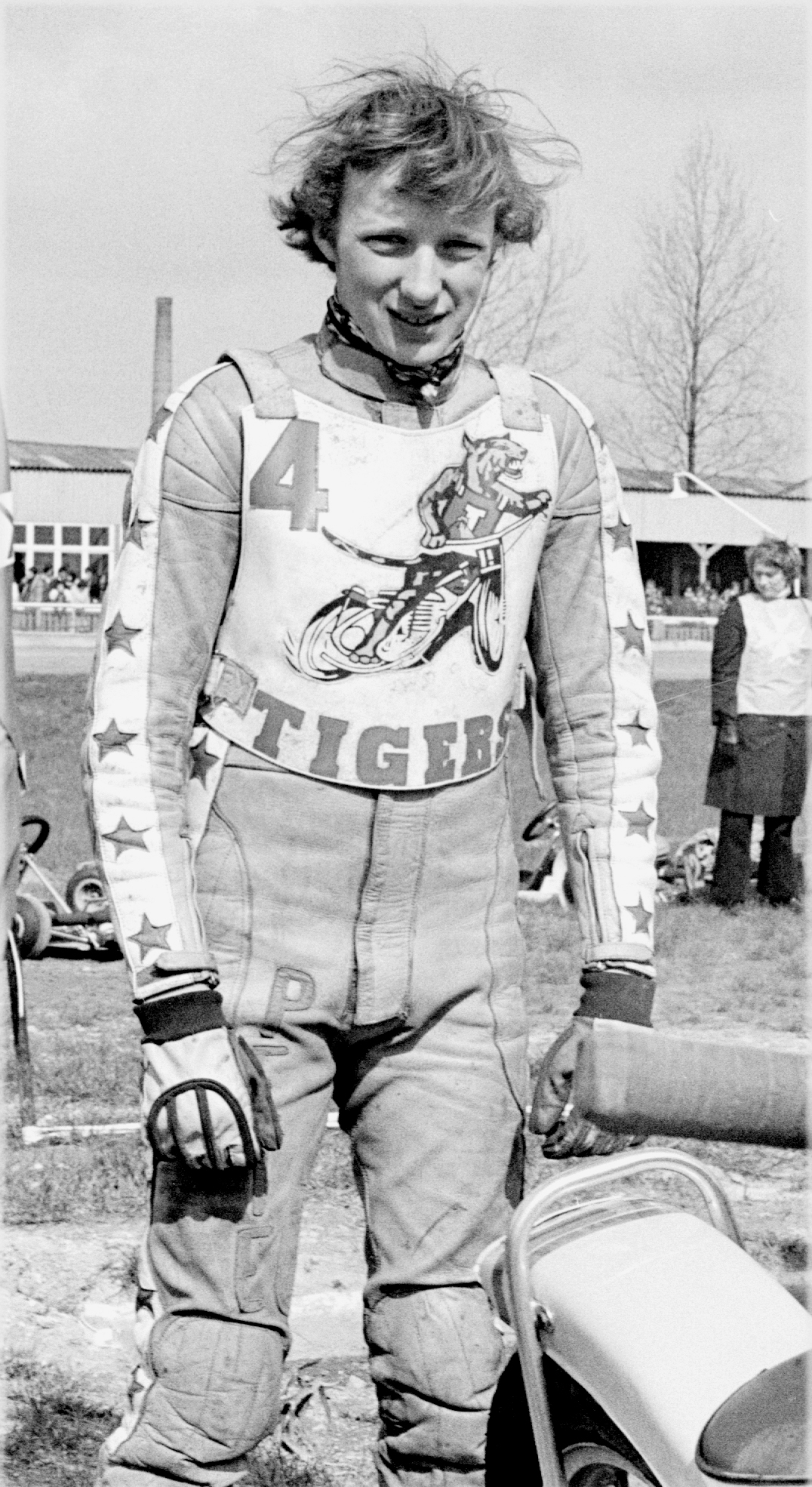
- Born: 12 March 1957 (age 69); Barnsley, England
- Nationality: British (English)

Career history
- 1975-1980: King's Lynn Stars
- 1975-1978, 1984: Teesside Tigers/Middlesbrough Tigers
- 1981: Leicester Lions
- 1981-1983, 1986: Stoke Potters
- 1985-1986: Long Eaton Invaders

Team honours
- 1980: Gauntlet Gold Cup

Peter Edward Smith (born 12 March 1957) is a former motorcycle speedway rider from England.

== Career ==
Born in Barnsley, Smith first rode at Boston in 1974 and was signed by British League King's Lynn Stars the following year. He had one match for the Stars in 1975 but most of his racing was in the National League on loan to Teesside Teessiders, for whom he did most of his racing until 1978.

By 1979, Smith had established himself as a regular member of the King's Lynn team, averaging close to five points per match. In 1981 he transferred to Leicester Lions, where he again averaged close to five points, also riding in the National League with Stoke Potters, where he established himself as a heat leader. Two seasons with Stoke followed before he returned to Middlesbrough in 1984, the Teessiders by now renamed Middlesbrough Tigers. He moved to Long Eaton Invaders in 1985, but by 1986 was only involved in a handful of matches. After a few outings for Stoke Potters in 1986 he retired from the sport for good.
