= Colin Cook (speedway rider) =

English motorcycle speedway rider

- Born: 29 August 1954 (age 72); Southwold, Suffolk, England
- Nickname: Cookie
- Nationality: British (English)

Career history
- 1975–1976: Scunthorpe Saints
- 1976–1979: Ipswich Witches
- 1977, 1984, 1986: Boston Barracudas
- 1979–1983: Leicester Lions
- 1984: Poole Pirates
- 1984: Sheffield Tigers
- 1984–1985: Swindon Robins
- 1985–1992: Exeter Falcons

Team honours
- 1977: National League Pairs
- 1978: British League KO Cup winner

Colin Cook (born 29 August 1954) is an English former motorcycle speedway rider who rode for Ipswich Witches and Leicester Lions in the British League, before spending eight successive seasons with the Exeter Falcons.

== Biography ==
Cook was born in Southwold in 1954. He took up speedway while working as a plant fitter, initially at Mildenhall, before joining Ipswich Witches in the mid-1970s. He was loaned out to National League team Scunthorpe Saints in 1975, averaging 5.91 in his first season.

After a further season at Scunthorpe, Cook moved on to the Boston Barracudas in 1977. A much improved season saw his average rise and he also won the National League Pairs Championship with Rob Hollingworth. In 1978, he was recalled by Ipswich and was part of the cup-winning team that year. Cook transferred to Leicester Lions early in the 1979 season for £2,500.

In 1982, Cook rose to the position of third heat-leader for the Lions, but his time at Leicester was hampered by injuries. After the Lions closed down in 1983, Cook moved back to Boston in 1984, where he became the club captain. A late withdraw by Boston in 1985, saw Cook switch to Exeter Falcons before spending the last eight years of his career with the Devon club. He retired at the end of the 1992 season.
