= Colin Richardson (speedway rider) =

British speedway rider

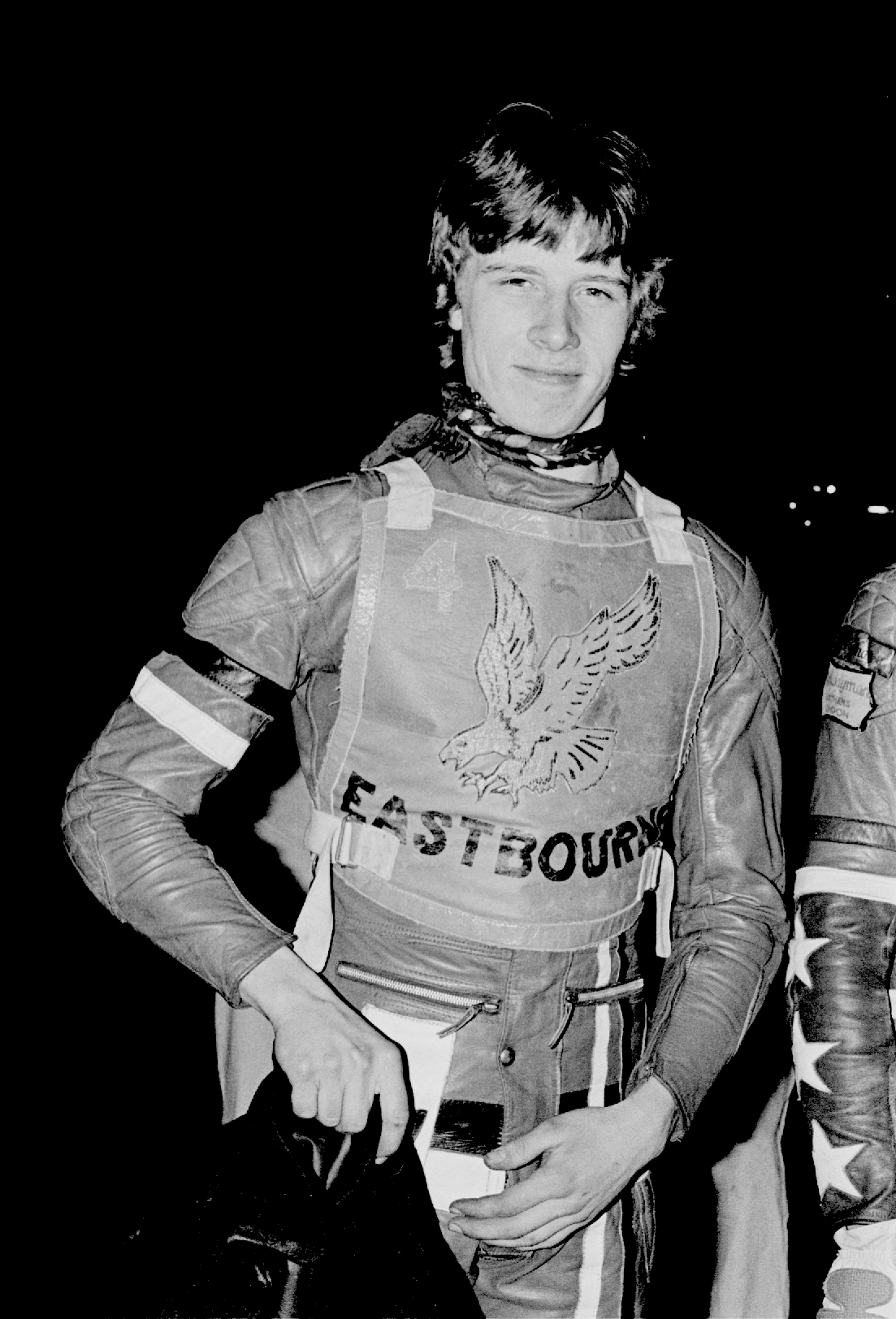
- Born: 24 November 1958 (age 67); Lambeth, London, England
- Nationality: British (English)

Career history
- 1975–1977, 1984–1986: Eastbourne Eagles
- 1976–1981: Wimbledon Dons
- 1982, 1983: King's Lynn Stars

Individual honours
- 1977: National League Riders Champion

Team honours
- 1986: League champion (tier 2)
- 1975, 1985, 1986: KO Cup (tier 2)
- 1979: Gauntlet Gold Cup

Colin Eric Richardson (born 24 November 1958 in London) is a former motorcycle speedway rider from England. He earned one international cap for the England national speedway team.

== Biography ==
Richardson was born on 24 November 1958 in Lambeth, London. He attended Wick Hill Secondary Modern School in Bracknell from 1970 to 1972 and then Garth Hill Comprehensive School, also in Bracknell, from 1973 to 1977.

Richardson's speedway career started when riding for Eastbourne Eagles in 1975 and Wimbledon Dons in 1976.

Richardson enjoyed a very successful 1977 winning the National League Riders' Championship, held at Wimbledon Stadium on 24 September 1977. In addition to the riders' title, he helped Eastbourne Eagles win the National League and Knockout cup double. The success continued with Wimbledon Dons in the top division because he won the Laurels on his home track.

In 1982, Richardson joined the King's Lynn Stars before returning to Eastbourne in 1984. In that year, Richardson took part in a three-Team Tournament raced at Eastbourne which included the hosts, Poole Pirates and Reading Racers. During Heat 1 Richardson was involved in a collision with New Zealand-born rider from the Reading Racers, Mitch Shirra, forcing Shirra into the perimeter safety fence. In 1986, he helped Eastbourne win the league and Knockout Cup double, although he did suffer injury and missed the latter part of the season.

Richardson represented England at full and Under-21 levels.

== Family ==
Richardson's son Lee was a speedway rider and had represented Great Britain, and was a former Speedway Grand Prix rider. On 13 May 2012, his son died of internal bleeding in a Wrocław hospital following a collision with a safety fence during a Polish League match.
