= 1954 Speedway National League Division Two =

British motorcycle speedway season

- League: National League Division Two
- No. of competitors: 11
- Champions: Bristol Bulldogs
- Southern Shield: Bristol Bulldogs
- Northern Shield: Lanarkshire Eagles
- Riders' Championship: Ken Middleditch
- Highest average: Ken McKinlay
- Division/s above: National League (Div 1)
- Division/s below: Southern League

The 1954 National League Division Two was the ninth post-war season of the second tier of motorcycle speedway in Great Britain.

== Summary ==
The Southern League was replaced by the Southern Area League which resulted in Division Two taking in teams from the defunct Southern League. Only St Austell Gulls declined to step up to the national level, whilst from the previous season Yarmouth Bloaters were not issued a racing licence and Stoke Potters withdrew. Bristol Bulldogs moved down from Division One to make 15 teams starting the season. However, Glasgow White City Tigers and Wolverhampton Wasps both suffered a series of poor results in the Northern Shield and both withdrew before the league campaign started.

Bristol Bulldogs won the league title. Bristol also won the early season Southern Shield, while Lanarkshire Eagles won the disrupted Northern Shield following the withdrawal of Glasgow and Wolverhampton.

Plymouth Devils withdrew after one league fixture and Edinburgh Monarchs withdrew mid-way through the 1954 season citing financial losses and their Managing Director Frank Varey also resigned.

== League ==
=== Final table ===
Pos	Team	M	W	D	L	Pts
1	Bristol Bulldogs	20	14	0	6	28
2	Poole Pirates	20	12	0	8	24
3	Swindon Robins	20	11	0	9	22
4	Leicester Hunters	20	11	0	9	22
5	Ipswich Witches	20	10	0	10	20
6	Exeter Falcons	20	10	0	10	20
7	Oxford Cheetahs	20	10	0	10	20
8	Coventry Bees	20	10	0	10	20
9	Southampton Saints	20	9	0	11	18
10	Lanarkshire Eagles	20	9	0	11	18
11	Rayleigh Rockets	20	4	0	16	8

- Glasgow White City Tigers, Wolverhampton Wasps withdrew before league racing
- Plymouth Devils, Edinburgh Monarchs withdrew, record expunged.

=== Fixtures and results ===
Home \ Away	BRI	COV	EX	IPS	LAN	LEI	OX	PP	RAY	SOT	SWI
Bristol		53–31	59–24	47–37	59–25	51–33	47–37	44.5–39.5	56–28	52–32	49–35
Coventry	43–41		45–38	48–36	57–27	37–46	38–46	43–41	52–31	53–31	35–48
Exeter	53–31	58–26		59–25	57–27	59–25	53–31	58–26	49–35	64–20	49–35
Ipswich	58–26	41–43	56–28		55–29	60–24	46–38	46–38	47–37	58–26	58–25
Lanarkshire	50–34	44–40	58–26	45–39		23–25	58–26	44–40	62–22	63–21	49–35
Leicester	39–45	37–47	62–22	45–39	54–30		56–28	54–30	62–22	54–30	39–45
Oxford	46–38	46–38	52–32	43–41	51–33	49–34		36–48	56–28	44–39	47–36
Poole	45–38	53–31	61–23	53–31	51–33	49–35	57–26		52–32	53–31	45–39
Rayleigh	39–45	40–44	54–30	37–47	49–35	37–47	56–28	33–51		46–38	41–43
Southampton	36–48	55–29	50–34	53–31	54–30	47–37	45–38	50–34	60–24		46–38
Swindon	39–45	57–27	49–35	62–22	49–17	38–46	45–39	54–30	50–34	48–36	

Legend: Blue = home team win; Yellow = draw; Red = away team win.

== Top five riders (league only) ==
	Rider	Nat	Team	C.M.A.
1	Ken McKinlay	(Scotland)	Leicester Hunters	10.88
2	Dick Bradley	(England)	Bristol Bulldogs	10.58
3	Ken Middleditch	(England)	Poole Pirates	10.03
5	Tommy Miller	(Scotland)	Coventry Bees	9.90
4	Bob Roger	(England)	Swindon Robins	9.58

== Shields ==
Southern Shield

Team	PL	W	D	L	Pts
Bristol	14	11	0	3	22
Exeter	14	10	0	4	20
Poole	13	8	0	5	16
Swindon	14	8	0	6	16
Rayleigh	14	6	0	8	12
Oxford	14	5	0	9	10
Southampton	14	4	0	10	8
Plymouth	13	3	0	10	6

Northern Shield

Team	PL	W	D	L	Pts
Lanarkshire	8	6	0	2	12
Coventry	8	5	1	2	11
Edinburgh	8	3	1	4	7
Ipswich	8	3	0	5	6
Leicester	8	2	0	6	4

Home \ Away	BRI	EX	OX	PLY	PP	RAY	SOT	SWI
Bristol		58–26	51–33	55–29	59–25	59–24	51–33	53–30
Exeter	47–36		58–26	55–28	49–35	63–21	52–31	51–33
Oxford	52–30	34–49		53–31	45–39	47–37	56–28	37–46
Plymouth	36–48	45–39	51–33		–	37–47	44–39	31–53
Poole	56–28	49–35	49–35	46–38		49–35	59–25	55–29
Rayleigh	40–44	54–30	45–39	46–38	35–46		51–33	50–32
So'ton	41–43	40–44	48–36	44–40	44–40	63–21		40–44
Swindon	33–51	31–53	46–38	61–22	53–31	48–36	52–32	

Legend: Blue = home team win; Yellow = draw; Red = away team win.

Home \ Away	COV	ED	GLA	IPS	LAN	LEI	WOL
Coventry		57–27	n/a	52–32	40–43	50–34	64–20
Edinburgh	42–42		47–36	48–35	43–40	51–33	n/a
Glasgow	32–51	38–45		n/a	n/a	n/a	n/a
Ipswich	47–37	54–30	48–36		32–52	46–38	n/a
Lanarkshire	41–43	55–29	58–25	55–29		66–18	n/a
Leicester	40–44	54–30	47–37	52–32	35–49		59–25
Wolves	30–54	49–35	n/a	n/a	28–56	38.5–44.5	

Legend: Blue = home team win; Yellow = draw; Red = away team win.

== Riders' Championship ==
Ken Middleditch won the National League Division Two Rider's Championship. The final was held at Hyde Road on 16 October.

Pos.	Rider	Pts
1	(England) Ken Middleditch	14
2	(Wales) Ian Williams	13
=3	(England) Bob Roger	11
=3	(England) Terry Small	11
=3	(England) Peter Robinson	11

== National Trophy ==
For the National Trophy see the 1954 Speedway National League.

== Midland Cup ==
For the Midland Cup see the 1954 Speedway National League.

== Riders and final averages ==
Bristol

- (England) Dick Bradley 10.58
- (England) Jack Unstead 8.71
- (England) Billy Hole 8.28
- (Australia) Chum Taylor 7.25
- (Wales) Tom Oakley 7.14
- (England) Johnny Hole 6.03
- (England) Roy Taylor 5.60
- (England) Geoff Pymar 5.31
- (Wales) Chris Boss 4.35
- (South Africa) Harry Serrurier 3.20
- (England) Cliff Cox 2.86

Coventry

- (Scotland) Tommy Miller 9.90
- (New Zealand) Charlie New 9.45
- (England) Peter Reason 6.86
- (England) Jim Lightfoot 6.61
- (England) Johnny Reason 6.56
- (England) Vic Emms 5.58
- (England) Reg Duval 5.60
- (England) Jack Hughes 5.38
- (England) Les Tolley 5.20
- (England) Derrick Tailby 4.30
- (Scotland) Bob Mark 4.92
- (England) Peter Brough 3.00
- (England) Jack Wright 2.33

Edinburgh (withdrew)

- (New Zealand) Dick Campbell 9.87
- (England) Don Cuppleditch 8.53
- (South Africa) Roy Bester 8.00
- (Scotland) Bert Clark 5.43
- (Scotland) Alf McIntosh 4.80
- (Scotland) Jimmy Cox 4.50
- (Scotland) Bob Mark 4.00
- (England) Eddie Lack 4.00
- (England) Bob Fletcher 3.73

Exeter

- (Australia) Jack Geran 8.57
- (England) Goog Hoskin 8.20
- (Australia) Hugh Geddes 7.67
- (England) John Hart 6.86
- (Australia) Neil Street 6.55
- (England) Alf Webster 5.94
- (England) Vic Gent 5.93
- (England) Don Hardy 5.13
- (England) Johnny Sargeant 5.03
- (New Zealand) Kevin Bock 3.33

Ipswich

- (Australia) Junior Bainbridge 9.32
- (England) Bert Edwards 8.85
- (New Zealand) Dick Campbell 8.45
- (Australia) Bob Sharp 6.38
- (England) Tich Read (George Snailum) 6.31
- (England) Reg Reeves 6.08
- (Australia) Johnny Chamberlain 5.89
- (England) Nobby Stock 5.44
- (England) Dennis Day 5.33
- (England) Len Silver 5.04
- (England) Sid Clark 5.03
- (England) Doug Papworth 3.68

Lanarkshire

- (England) Derick Close 9.30
- (Scotland) Tommy Miller 7.70
- (Australia) Ron Phillips 7.59
- (Scotland) Gordon McGregor 6.29
- (Scotland) Larry Lazarus 6.07
- (Scotland) Scott Hall 6.00
- (Australia) Bluey Scott 5.96
- (England) Johnny Green 5.46
- (England) Cyril Cooper 4.95
- (Scotland) Doug Templeton 3.20

Leicester

- (Scotland) Ken McKinlay 10.88
- (South Africa) Roy Bester 8.25
- (Scotland) Jock Grierson 7.61
- (England) Dennis Gray 6.53
- (England) Reg Fearman 6.38
- (England) Don Potter 6.26
- (England) Bill Griffiths 5.93
- (England) Len Williams 5.33
- (England) Alf Parker 5.09
- (England) Charlie Barsby 4.94
- (England) Lionel Watling (James Goldingay) 3.05

Oxford

- (England) Peter Robinson 8.85
- (England) Ronnie Genz 8.10
- (England) Bob Baker 6.34
- (New Zealand) Bill Thatcher 6.30
- (England) Kid Curtis 5.73
- (England) Bill Osborne 5.71
- (England) Bob Wells 5.45
- (England) Frank Johnson 5.24
- (England) Jim Gregory 4.87
- (New Zealand) Bob McFarlane 4.86
- (England) Dennis Newton 4.44

Plymouth (withdrew)

- (England) Pete Lansdale 9.00
- (England) Alan Smith 8.50
- (England) Vic Gent 7.33
- (New Zealand) Bill Thatcher 7.00
- (England) Ken Holmes 7.00
- (England) George Wall 5.14
- (Australia) Harold Bull 4.79
- (New Zealand) Kevin Hayden 4.26
- (Australia) Jack Gates 4.00
- (New Zealand) Hec Mayhead 4.00
- (New Zealand) Kevin Bock 3.80

Poole

- (England) Ken Middleditch 10.03
- (England) Bill Holden 9.26
- (England) Jimmy Squibb 7.76
- (England) Terry Small 6.92
- (England) Tony Lewis 6.55
- (England) Johnny Thomson 6.78
- (England) Allan Kidd 6.05
- (England) Norman Strachan 5.50
- (South Africa) Vern McWilliams 3.20
- (England) Fred Perkins 0.57

Rayleigh

- (England) Gerry Jackson 8.43
- (New Zealand) Peter Clark 8.20
- (England) Les McGillivray 7.37
- (England) Maury McDermott 5.81
- (England) Pete Lansdale 5.46
- (England) Tom O'Connor 4.73
- (England) Frank Bettis 4.49
- (New Zealand) Jules Benson 3.78
- (England) George Wall 3.53
- (England) Alby Smith 2.93
- (England) Norman Street 2.00

Southampton

- (England) Charlie May 7.33
- (England) Brian Hanham 6.92
- (New Zealand) Brian McKeown 6.82
- (Guernsey) Johnny Fitzparick 6.62
- (England) Ken Adams 6.46
- (England) Ernie Rawlins 6.22
- (England) Maury Mattingley 5.59
- (Australia) Ernie Brecknell (Ernest Blight) 5.41
- (England) Gerald Pugh 1.33

Swindon

- (England) Bob Roger 9.58
- (New Zealand) Mick Holland 8.00
- (England) George White 6.79
- (England) Ron Swaine 6.63
- (England) Danny Malone 6.32
- (Wales) Ian Williams 6.26
- (England) Bob Jones 5.49
- (England) Ray Harris 5.28
- (Australia) Gordon Leigh 4.15

== See also ==
List of United Kingdom Speedway League Champions
