= 1952 Speedway National League Division Two =

British motorcycle speedway season

- League: National League Division Two
- No. of competitors: 12
- Champions: Poole Pirates
- National Trophy (Div 2 final): Poole Pirates
- Midland Cup: Coventry Bees
- Highest average: Tommy Miller
- Division/s above: National League (Div 1)
- Division/s below: Southern League

The 1952 National League Division Two was the seventh post-war season of the second tier of motorcycle speedway in Great Britain.

== Summary ==
The post-war boom was now fading and the League was shortened to 12 teams with Division Three now defunct and continued only on a regional basis. Previous champions Norwich Stars had been promoted to Division One. Newcastle, Walthamstow and Halifax had closed whilst Fleetwood Flyers changed to Fleetwood Knights and ran only open meetings. Poole Pirates were the only new entrant, promoted from the former lower tier.

Poole Pirates won the title, having won Division Three in the previous season.

== Final table ==
Pos	Team	PL	W	D	L	Pts
1	Poole Pirates	44	31	1	12	63
2	Coventry Bees	44	25	5	14	55
3	Leicester Hunters	44	25	2	17	52
4	Cradley Heath Heathens	44	24	0	20	48
5	Glasgow White City Tigers	44	23	1	20	47
6	Edinburgh Monarchs	44	21	4	19	46
7	Ashfield Giants	44	19	3	22	41
8	Motherwell Eagles	44	19	2	23	40
9	Yarmouth Bloaters	44	20	0	24	40
10	Stoke Potters	44	18	1	25	37
11	Liverpool Chads	44	16	3	25	35
12	Oxford Cheetahs	44	11	2	31	24

== Fixtures & results ==
=== A fixtures ===
Home \ Away	ASH	COV	CH	ED	GLA	LEI	LIV	MOT	OX	PP	STO	YAR
Ashfield		42–42	51–33	53–31	36–48	50–34	47–37	32–51	47–37	48–36	50–34	52–32
Coventry	41–43		43–41	42–41	48–36	32–52	54–30	45–39	45–39	44–40	50–34	56–28
Cradley Heath	49–35	53–31		51–33	56–28	40–44	50–34	47–37	46–38	36–48	56–28	57–27
Edinburgh	43–41	53–31	55–29		53–31	42–42	42–42	46–38	54–30	37–47	56–28	54–30
Glasgow	42–42	47–37	49–35	56–28		49–35	56–28	43–41	56–28	49–35	53–31	58–26
Leicester	52–32	38–46	40–44	48–35	48–36		37–47	52–32	50–34	49–35	45–39	54–30
Liverpool	48–36	40–44	44–40	45–39	41–43	50–34		43–41	58–26	25–58	42–42	62–21
Motherwell	39–45	50–34	48–36	41–40	40–44	48–36	50–33		51–33	44–40	49–35	62–22
Oxford	52–32	44–40	51–30	52–32	53–29	38–45	38–46	41–43		33–51	44–40	51–33
Poole	58–26	59–25	69–15	48–36	61–23	50–34	60–24	62–22	42–42		64–20	62–22
Stoke	57–27	51–33	32–51	45–39	53–31	53–31	64–20	47–34	51–33	53–31		49–35
Yarmouth	54–30	55–29	50–34	35–49	56–28	38–46	61–23	49–35	52–32	44–40	45–39	

Legend: Blue = home team win; Yellow = draw; Red = away team win.

=== B fixtures ===
Home \ Away	ASH	COV	CH	ED	GLA	LEI	LIV	MOT	OX	PP	STO	YAR
Ashfield		43–41	41–42	43–41	45–38	35–49	44–40	43–41	60–24	35–49	56–28	51–33
Coventry	56–28		48–36	42–42	54–30	42–42	59–25	48–36	62–21	55–29	59–25	50–34
Cradley Heath	45–39	48–36		44–40	55–29	52–32	52–32	51–33	54–30	38–46	58–26	46–38
Edinburgh	61–23	39–45	44–40		46–38	53–29	50–34	45–39	59–25	46–38	59–25	47–37
Glasgow	47–37	38–46	40–44	46–38		38–45	61–23	45–39	59–24	45–38	52–32	56–28
Leicester	47–37	38–46	46–38	45–39	58–26		54–30	48–36	53–31	32–52	51–32	50–34
Liverpool	47–37	42–42	56–28	34–50	47–37	40–44		59–25	50–34	40–44	60–24	59–25
Motherwell	39–44	42–42	49–35	42–42	41–43	49–35	51–33		54–30	43–41	54–30	55–29
Oxford	42–42	32–52	35–49	43–41	35–49	37–47	44–40	41–43		24–60	51–33	46–38
Poole	55–29	52–32	57–27	54–30	56–28	59–25	60–24	60–24	66–18		67–17	68–16
Stoke	60–24	32–52	54–30	38–46	54–30	46–38	52–32	50–33	53–31	40–44		58–26
Yarmouth	65–19	47–37	55–29	54–30	57–27	56–28	67–17	62–22	64–20	58–26	44–40	

Legend: Blue = home team win; Yellow = draw; Red = away team win.

== Top Five Riders (League only) ==
	Rider	Nat	Team	C.M.A.
1	Tommy Miller	(Scotland)	Glasgow	10.91
2	Derick Close	(England)	Motherwell	10.57
3	Fred Brand	(England)	Yarmouth	9.82
4	Brian Crutcher	(England)	Poole	9.66
5	Ken Middleditch	(England)	Poole	9.63

== National Trophy Stage Two ==
- For Stage One - see Stage One
- For Stage Three - see Stage Three

The 1952 National Trophy was the 15th edition of the Knockout Cup. The Trophy consisted of three stages; stage one was for the third-tier clubs, stage two was for the second-tier clubs and stage three was for the top-tier clubs. The winner of stage one would qualify for stage two and the winner of stage two would qualify for the third and final stage. Poole won stage two and therefore qualified for stage three.

Second Division qualifying first round

Date	Team one	Score	Team two
05/06	Plymouth	57-51	Poole
02/06	Poole	67-41	Plymouth
24/05	Coventry	71-36	Motherwell
24/05	Stoke	71-37	Cradley Heath
23/05	Cradley Heath	67-41	Stoke
23/05	Motherwell	61-47	Coventry
19/05	Liverpool	71-37	Edinburgh
17/05	Edinburgh	67-41	Liverpool
13/05	Yarmouth	61-47	Leicester
09/05	Leicester	71-37	Yarmouth

Second Division Qualifying Second round

Date	Team one	Score	Team two
19/06	Oxford	53-55	Poole
09/06	Poole	78-30	Oxford
07/06	Coventry	52-55	Leicester
07/06	Stoke	55-52	Liverpool
06/06	Leicester	55-53	Coventry
02/06	Liverpool	75.5-32.5	Stoke
24/05	Glasgow Ashfield	52-56	Glasgow White City
21/05	Glasgow White City	65-43	Glasgow Ashfield

Second Division Qualifying semifinals

Date	Team one	Score	Team two
20/06	Leicester	46-62	Glasgow White City
18/06	Glasgow White City	53-55	Leicester
25/06	Poole	85-23	Liverpool

=== Second Division Qualifying final ===
First leg

30 June 1952

Poole Pirates Ken Middleditch 13 Brian Crutcher 12 Tony Lewis 11 Jimmy Squibb 11 Alan Kidd 8 Bill Holden 4 Terry Small 2 Roy Craighead 0	61 – 47	Glasgow White City Tigers Junior Bainbridge 14 Tommy Miller 13 Don Wilkinson 8 Ken McKinlay 8 Len Nicholson 4 Alf McIntosh 1 Peter Dykes 1 Stuart Irvine 0

Wimborne Road

Second leg

2 July 1952

Glasgow White City Tigers Ken McKinlay 16 Tommy Miller 15 Junior Bainbridge 12 Alf McIntosh 6 Len Nicholson 4 Don Wilkinson 3 Peter Dykes 3 Stuart Irvine 0	58 – 50	Poole Pirates Brian Crutcher 13 Jimmy Squibb 13 Ken Middleditch 12 Bill Holden 4 Terry Small 4 Alan Kidd 2 Tony Lewis 1 Roy Craighead 1

White City Stadium

== Midland Cup ==
Coventry won the Midland Cup, which consisted of eight teams. There was one team from division 1, five teams from division 2 and two teams from division 3.

First round

Team one	Team two	Score
Wolverhampton	Long Eaton	69–26, 59–37

Second round

Team one	Team two	Score
Leicester	Stoke	54–42, 42–53
Oxford	Wolverhampton	62–34, 45–51
Cradley	Coventry	50–46, 34–62

Semi final round

Team one	Team two	Score
Oxford	Coventry	25–71, 26–70
Birmingham	Leicester	70–26, 63–33

=== Final ===
First leg

6 October 1952

Birmingham Dan Forsberg 14 Arthur Payne 13 Ron Mountford 8 Lionel Watling 6 Eric Boothroyd 5 Cyril Page 4 Ivor Davies 2 Ron Mason 1	53–43	Coventry Johnnie Reason 13 Vic Emms 7 Peter Brough 5 Stan Williams 5 Les Hewitt 5 Derrick Tailby 5 Charlie New 2 Jack Wright 1

Perry Barr Stadium
Attendance: 20,000

Second leg

25 October 1952

Coventry Peter Brough 14 Vic Emms 12 Johnnie Reason 11 Les Hewitt 9 Derrick Tailby 7 John Yates 6 Cyril Cooper 5 Stan Williams 3	67–29	Birmingham Alan Hunt 7 Ron Mountford 6 Ron Mason 4 Ivor Davies 4 Cyril Page 4 Bill Jemison 3 Lionel Watling 1 Eric Boothroyd 0

Brandon Stadium
Attendance: 17,000

Coventry won on aggregate 110–82

== Riders & final averages ==
Ashfield

- (Scotland) Willie Wilson 8.29
- (England) Bruce Semmens 6.76
- (Scotland) Larry Lazarus 6.64
- (Australia) Chum Taylor 6.62
- (Australia) Jack Gates 6.16
- (Australia) Ron Phillips 6.07
- (England) Dick Howard 5.35
- (Australia) Merv Harding 4.19
- (England) Ron Johnson 4.18
- (England) Cyril Cooper 3.30
- (Scotland) Eric Liddell 1.76

Coventry

- (England) Vic Emms 9.48
- (Australia) Les Hewitt 9.05
- (England) Johnny Reason 7.83
- (New Zealand) Charlie New 6.93
- (England) Stan Williams 6.72
- (England) Peter Brough 6.21
- (England) Derrick Tailby 5.64
- (England) Jack Wright 4.42
- (England) John Yates 4.34
- (Australia) Lionel Levy 4.00

Cradley Heath

- (England) Harry Bastable 8.70
- (England) Brian Shepherd 8.24
- (England) Jim Tolley 7.41
- (England) Les Tolley 7.02
- (England) Phil Malpass 6.62
- (England) Fred Perkins 5.63
- (England) Dick Tolley 5.24
- (England) Guy Allott 5.16
- (England) Derek Braithwaite 5.08
- (England) Geoff Bennett 4.43
- (England) Wilf Willstead 2.00

Edinburgh

- (England) Don Cuppleditch 9.54
- (Scotland) Bob Mark 9.14
- (New Zealand) Dick Campbell 9.09
- (England) Harold Fairhurst 8.07
- (England) Eddie Lack 6.45
- (Australia) Keith Gurtner 5.68
- (England) Johnny Green 4.78
- (Scotland) Jimmy Cox 4.66
- (Scotland) Harry Darling 3.12
- (Scotland) Jock Scott 2.13

Glasgow

- (Scotland) Tommy Miller 10.91
- (Australia) Junior Bainbridge 8.15
- (Scotland) Ken McKinlay 8.14
- (Scotland) Alf McIntosh 5.88
- (New Zealand) Peter Dykes 5.50
- (England) Don Wilkinson 5.17
- (Australia) Bob Sharp 4.92
- (England) Len Nicholson 4.65
- (England) Jack Hodgson 4.27
- (England) Frank Hodgson 3.95
- (Scotland) Stuart Irvine 1.07

Leicester

- (England) Len Williams 9.14
- (Australia) Lionel Benson 8.48
- (Scotland) Jock Grierson 7.88
- (England) Joe Bowkis 6.29
- (England) Les Beaumont 6.26
- (England) Harwood Pike 6.10
- (England) Alf Parker 5.61
- (New Zealand) Laurie Holland 4.81
- (England) Charlie Barsby 4.15

Liverpool

- (England) Peter Robinson 9.13
- (England) Reg Duval 7.37
- (England) Tommy Allott 7.37
- (England) Don Potter 7.36
- (England) Harry Welch 6.77
- (England) Bill Griffiths 6.09
- (England) Len Read 5.79
- (England) Eric Smith 4.77
- (England) Alf Webster 4.52
- (Australia) Tommy Anderson 3.68
- (England) Val Morton 3.36

Motherwell

- (England) Derick Close 10.57
- (Scotland) Gordon McGregor 8.18
- (Australia) Noel Watson 7.51
- (Australia) Keith Gurtner 7.23
- (England) Will Lowther 5.53
- (England) Johnny Green 5.47
- (England) Stan Bradbury 5.21
- (England) Joe Crowther 4.80
- (Australia) Bluey Scott 4.17
- (Scotland) Scott Hall 3.29
- (Scotland) Bob Lindsay 3.00

Oxford

- (England) Jim Gregory 7.42
- (England) Jim Boyd 6.79
- (England) Harry Saunders 6.39
- (England) Bill Osborne 6.17
- (New Zealand) Frank Boyle 5.03
- (England) Bill Kemp 5.62
- (England) Herby King 4.92
- (England) Ron Wilson 4.50
- (England) Len Glover 3.83
- (England) Ernie Lessiter 1.00

Poole

- (England) Brian Crutcher 9.66
- (England) Ken Middleditch 9.63
- (England) Terry Small 8.75
- (England) Bill Holden 7.93
- (England) Tony Lewis 7.90
- (England) Jimmy Squibb 7.64
- (England) Johnny Thomson 6.93
- (England) Roy Craighead 6.63
- (England) Allan Kidd 6.40

Stoke

- (England) Ken Adams 8.50
- (England) Ron Peace 7.50
- (England) Reg Fearman 7.44
- (England) Les Jenkins 6.73
- (England) Ray Harris 5.64
- (Guernsey) Johnny Fitzparick 5.40
- (England) Fred Siggins 5.29
- (England) Peter Orpwood 5.25
- (England) Gil Blake 5.16
- (England) Derek Braithwaite 4.98

Yarmouth

- (England) Fred Brand 9.82
- (England) Bob Baker 9.62
- (England) Reg Reeves 6.77
- (England) Terry Courtnell 6.73
- (Australia) Johnny Chamberlain 5.53
- (England) Reg Morgan 5.38
- (Australia) Gundy Harris 4.76
- (England) Tip Mills 4.75
- (England) Vic Ridgeon 3.13
- (England) Roy Bowers 4.73
- (England) Stan Page 4.63

== See also ==
- List of United Kingdom Speedway League Champions
- Knockout Cup (speedway)
