= 1951 Speedway National League Division Two =

British speedway season

- League: National League Division Two
- No. of competitors: 16
- Champions: Norwich Stars
- National Trophy (Div 2 final): Norwich Stars
- Midland Cup: Leicester Hunters
- Central Shield: Cradley Heath
- Northern Shield: Edinburgh
- Southern Shield: Norwich Stars
- Highest average: Jack Young
- Division/s above: National League (Div 1)
- Division/s below: National League (Div 3)

The 1951 National League Division Two was the sixth post-war season of the second tier of motorcycle speedway in Great Britain.

== Summary ==
The League was extended again with 18 teams starting the season. New entrants were Motherwell Eagles and there were again three teams promoted from Division Three - the champions Oxford Cheetahs, third-place finishers Leicester Hunters and Liverpool Chads (despite finishing 8th). Plymouth Devils moved back down in the opposite direction.

Norwich Stars retained their league title, while Cradley Heath, Edinburgh and Norwich won the early season shield competitions.

Another rider was killed at the Firs Stadium (a fourth in five years). Twenty-one-year-old Bob Howes died after hitting the fence during a training practice race on 10 November 1951.

Southampton Saints and Sheffield Tigers resigned in mid-season and their records were expunged. Jimmy Baxter Director of Southern Speedways withdrew Southampton from the league largely due to 45% entertainment duty imposed by the government. and they had their results expunged.

== Final table ==
Pos	Team	PL	W	D	L	Pts
1	Norwich Stars	30	24	0	6	48
2	Leicester Hunters	30	19	0	11	38
3	Edinburgh Monarchs	30	18	0	12	36
4	Coventry Bees	30	16	3	11	35
5	Walthamstow Wolves	30	17	0	13	34
6	Halifax Dukes	30	17	0	13	34
7	Motherwell Eagles	30	16	1	13	33
8	Ashfield Giants	30	16	0	14	32
9	Hanley Potters	30	15	0	15	30
10	Glasgow White City Tigers	30	14	1	15	29
11	Yarmouth Bloaters	30	13	1	16	27
12	Oxford Cheetahs	30	12	2	16	26
13	Liverpool Chads	30	12	1	17	25
14	Fleetwood Flyers	30	9	2	19	20
15	Cradley Heath Heathens	30	9	0	21	18
16	Newcastle Diamonds	30	7	1	22	15

== Fixtures & results ==
Home \ Away	ASH	COV	CH	ED	FLE	GLA	HAL	HAN	LEI	LIV	MOT	NEW	NOR	OX	WAL	YAR
Ashfield		64–20	57–27	40–44	54–30	55–29	52–32	56–28	51–33	40–44	45–38	55–29	41–43	44–40	47–37	56–28
Coventry	51–31		57–27	51–32	60–23	42–42	52–32	36–48	43–41	44–40	59–25	57–27	45–39	43–41	44–40	63–21
Cradley	41–43	48–35		39–44	55–29	55–29	37–47	32–52	23–61	54–30	41–40	60–24	39–45	56–28	32–52	52–32
Edinburgh	46–38	38–45	61–23		58–26	55–29	55–29	55–29	37–47	50–34	36–48	64–20	37–47	51–33	48–36	52–32
Fleetwood	41–42	44–40	46–36	36–48		45–39	40–44	52–31	46–38	38–40	42–42	45–38	33–51	53–31	49–35	56–28
Glasgow	56–28	46–38	60–23	44–40	65–19		52–32	60–4	53–31	54–30	40–44	51–33	53–30	57–27	49–35	57–27
Halifax	48–36	41–43	50–34	54–30	60–24	55–29		58–26	39–45	47–37	60–24	56–28	51–33	48–36	43–41	57–27
Hanley	43–41	49–34	60–24	51–32	60–23	53–31	43–40		50–34	53–31	37–47	57–24	41–42	62–22	34–49	46–38
Leicester	49–35	44–40	55–29	47–37	57–27	51–33	40–44	47–37		58–26	52–32	60–24	48–36	50–34	48–36	55–29
Liverpool	47–37	42–42	34–50	41–43	51–32	47–37	39–45	50–34	54–30		41–43	61–23	34–49	52–32	49–35	51–33
Motherwell	41–43	43–41	43–41	40–42	55–29	50–34	53–31	55–29	43–41	34–50		40–44	46–38	61–23	47–37	65–19
Newcastle	40–44	40–43	43–41	32–52	42–42	45–39	44–40	30–54	36–47	50–34	28–56		36–48	37–46	50–34	57–27
Norwich	55–29	57–27	59–25	55–28	62–22	59–25	61–23	64–20	54–30	60–24	62–22	58–26		67–17	60–24	63–21
Oxford	56–28	42–42	45–39	45–38	61–23	47–37	48–36	49–35	32–52	50–34	53–31	55–29	40–44		33–47	50–34
Walthamstow	52–31	48–36	63–21	51–33	67–16	49–35	57–27	61–23	59–25	54–29	50–34	54–29	39–45	58–25		56–28
Yarmouth	60–24	44–38	48–35	37–47	63–18	46–38	53–31	51–33	50–34	49–35	49–35	52–31	44–40	42–42	46–38	

Legend: Blue = home team win; Yellow = draw; Red = away team win.

== Top five riders (league only) ==
	Rider	Nat	Team	C.M.A.
1	Jack Young	(Australia)	Edinburgh	11.72
2	Bob Leverenz	(Australia)	Norwich	10.84
3	Derick Close	(England)	Newcastle/Motherwell	10.71
4	Tommy Miller	(Scotland)	Glasgow Tigers	10.70
5	Arthur Forrest	(England)	Halifax	10.30

== National Trophy Stage Two ==
- For Stage One - see Stage One
- For Stage Three - see Stage Three

The 1951 National Trophy was the 14th edition of the Knockout Cup. The Trophy consisted of three stages; stage one was for the third division clubs, stage two was for the second division clubs and stage three was for the top-tier clubs. The winner of stage one would qualify for stage two and the winner of stage two would qualify for the third and final stage. Norwich won stage two and therefore qualified for stage three.

Second Division qualifying first round

Date	Team one	Score	Team two
14/05	Exeter	60-47	Oxford
10/05	Oxford	80-28	Exeter
09/05	Fleetwood	64-44	Newcastle
04/05	Southampton	60-48	Walthamstow
30/04	Newcastle	71-36	Fleetwood
30/04	Walthamstow	77-31	Southampton

Second Division Qualifying Second round

Date	Team one	Score	Team two
28/05	Cradley Heath	58-49	Coventry
26/05	Coventry	48-60	Cradley Heath
24/05	Oxford	61-47	Yarmouth
22/05	Yarmouth	63-44	Oxford
21/05	Newcastle	47-70	Norwich
19/05	Norwich	79-29	Newcastle
14/05	Walthamstow	81-26	Stoke Hanley
12/05	Edinburgh	77-29	Leicester
12/05	Stoke Hanley	59-49	Walthamstow
11/05	Leicester	46-62	Edinburgh
11/05	Motherwell	39-69	Halifax
09/05	Halifax	79-29	Motherwell
08/05	Glasgow Ashfield	70-38	Liverpool
07/05	Liverpool	62-46	Glasgow Ashfield
-	Glasgow	w/o	Sheffield

Second Division Qualifying quarterfinals

Date	Team one	Score	Team two
05/06	Glasgow Ashfield	71-37	Cradley Heath
30/05	Glasgow White City	64-44	Norwich
26/05	Edinburgh	68-40	Halifax
23/05	Halifax	68-39	Edinburgh
26/05	Norwich	14-4	Glasgow White City
11/06	Walthamstow	73-35	Yarmouth
09/06	Norwich	81-27	Glasgow White City
29/05	Yarmouth	57-51	Walthamstow

Second Division Qualifying semifinals

Date	Team one	Score	Team two
07/07	Norwich	67.5-40.5	Cradley Heath
11/06	Cradley Heath	83-25	Glasgow Ashfield
04/07	Halifax	71-37	Walthamstow
02/07	Walthamstow	74-34	Halifax

=== Second Division Qualifying final ===
First leg

28 July 1951

Norwich Stars Phil Clarke 17 Bob Leverenz 16 Paddy Mills 11 Fred Pawson 10 Jack Freeman 10 Alec Hunter 9 Fred Rogers 6 Bill Codling 4	83 – 25	Walthamstow Wolves Benny King 7 Pete Lansdale 6 Harry Edwards 5 Jimmy Grant 3 Alby Smith 2 Sid Clarke 1 Jim Boyd 1 Reg Reeves 0

The Firs Stadium

Second leg

30 July 1951

Walthamstow Wolves Jim Boyd 12 Benny King 12 Archie Windmill 7 Reg Reeves 6 Harry Edwards 5 Pete Lansdale 4 Sid Clarke 2 Jimmy Grant 2	50 – 58	Norwich Stars Bob Leverenz 18 Fred Rogers 10 Phil Clarke 9 Jack Freeman 7 Fred Pawson 6 Alec Hunter 6 Paddy Mills 2 Bill Codling 0

Walthamstow Stadium

== Shields ==
Southern Shield

Team	PL	W	D	L	Pts
Norwich	10	7	1	2	15
Walthamstow	10	6	0	4	12
Oxford	10	6	0	4	12
Southampton	10	5	1	4	11
Yarmouth	10	2	0	8	4
Coventry	10	1	0	9	2

Central Shield

Team	PL	W	D	L	Pts
Cradley Heath	10	7	0	3	14
Leicester	10	6	0	4	12
Halifax	10	5	1	4	11
Hanley	10	5	0	5	10
Sheffield	10	3	1	6	7
Liverpool	10	2	1	7	5

Home \ Away	COV	NOR	OX	SOT	WAL	YAR
Coventry		26–58	37–47	33–51	40–43	48–35
Norwich	55–27		51–33	61–23	56–28	63–21
Oxford	53–50	50–34		48–53	49–35	52–32
Southampton	51–33	42–42	43–41		34–50	68–16
Walthamstow	51–32	55–29	39–45	51–33		50–34
Yarmouth	55–29	23–61	36–48	54–30	28–56	

Legend: Blue = home team win; Yellow = draw; Red = away team win.

Home \ Away	CH	HAL	HAN	LEI	LIV	SHE
Cradley Heath		51–33	52–31	38–46	57–26	56–28
Halifax	41–43		56–28	54–30	55–29	51–33
Hanley	45–39	62–22		45–39	62–20	52–32
Leicester	54–30	57–27	52.5–31.5		61–23	50–34
Liverpool	34–50	33–51	49–35	46–38		42–42
Sheffield	36–48	42–42	48–36	44–40	50–34	

Legend: Blue = home team win; Yellow = draw; Red = away team win.

Northern Shield

Team	PL	W	D	L	Pts
Edinburgh	10	9	0	1	18
Glasgow	10	7	0	3	10
Newcastle	10	5	0	5	10
Motherwell	10	4	0	6	8
Ashfield	10	3	0	7	6
Fleetwood	10	2	0	8	4

Home \ Away	ASH	ED	FLE	GLA	MOT	NEW
Ashfield		30–54	53–31	40–44	61–23	38–46
Edinburgh	50–32		59–25	61–23	62–21	54–30
Fleetwood	43–41	29–55		35–49	39–44	45–39
Glasgow	57–27	42–41	56–28		51–32	47–37
Motherwell	39–45	27–57	46–38	46–35		42–41
Newcastle	47–35	38–44	58–26	47–37	52–32	

Legend: Blue = home team win; Yellow = draw; Red = away team win.

== Midland Cup ==
Leicester won the inaugural Midland Cup, which consisted of eight teams. There was one team from division 1, five teams from division 2 and two teams from division 3.

First round

Team one	Team two	Score
Hanley	Wolverhampton	67–29, 60–30

Second round

Team one	Team two	Score
Leicester	Long Eaton	75–21, 52–44
Oxford	Coventry	58–38, 37–59
Cradley	Hanley	57–39, 45–50

Semi final round

Team one	Team two	Score
Coventry	Leicester	49–45, 41–55
Birmingham	Cradley	65–30, 62–34

=== Final ===
First leg

13 October 1951

Birmingham Graham Warren 14 Alan Hunt 11 Ron Mountford 10 Eric Boothroyd 7 Lionel Watling 3 Cyril Page 2 Roy Browning 1 Jim Tolley 0	48–48	Leicester Len Williams 14 Les Beaumont 10 Fred Perkins 7 Johnny Carpenter 7 Lionel Benson 4 Laurie Holland 4 Harwood Pike 2 Vic Pitcher 0

Perry Barr Stadium

Second leg

19 October 1951

Leicester Len Williams 13 Lionel Benson 10 Fred Perkins 9 Johnny Carpenter 7 Les Beaumont 3 Harwood Pike 2 Laurie Holland 4 Jock Grierson 2	50–46	Birmingham Graham Warren 11 Alan Hunt 10 Eric Boothroyd 6 Ron Mountford 10 Cyril Page 4 Lionel Watling 3 Jim Tolley 2 Roy Browning 0

Leicester Stadium

Leicester won on aggregate 98–94

== Riders & final averages ==
Ashfield

- (England) Bruce Semmens 9.02
- (Australia) Merv Harding 8.57
- (Scotland) Willie Wilson 7.30
- (England) Cyril Cooper 6.20
- (Australia) Jack Gates 6.17
- (Australia) Ron Phillips 6.07
- (Scotland) Larry Lazarus 5.61
- (England) Ron Johnson 4.46
- (England) Bob Lovell 4.39
- (Scotland) Eric Liddell 2.74

Coventry

- (Australia) Les Hewitt 8.48
- (England) Bob Fletcher 8.21
- (England) Johnny Reason 8.04
- (England) Stan Williams 6.99
- (New Zealand) Charlie New 6.24
- (England) John Yates 5.91
- (England) Derrick Tailby 5.63
- (England) Jack Wright 5.85
- (England) Cyril Cooper 5.58
- (England) Peter Brough 5.26
- (England) Wilf Plant 4.73

Cradley Heath

- (England) Brian Shepherd 9.00
- (England) Laurie Schofield 6.76
- (England) Gil Craven 8.56
- (England) Phil Malpass 7.86
- (England) Guy Allott 6.55
- (England) Les Tolley 6.51
- (England) Harry Bastable 6.14
- (England) Dick Tolley 5.15
- (England) Dennis Hitchings 4.43
- (England) Wilf Willstead 4.00
- (England) Bill Clifton 3.52
- (Australia) Don Prettejohn 1.74

Edinburgh

- (Australia) Jack Young 11.72
- (England) Don Cuppleditch 8.45
- (New Zealand) Dick Campbell 8.15
- (Scotland) Bob Mark 7.36
- (England) Harold Fairhurst 7.11
- (England) Johnny Green 5.74
- (England) Eddie Lack 5.38
- (Scotland) Jim Turner 3.45
- (England) Harold Booth 3.00
- (Scotland) Jackie Campbell 2.53
- (Scotland) Jimmy Cox 2.45

Fleetwood

- (England) Norman Hargreaves 8.00
- (England) Wilf Jay 7.93
- (England) Don Potter 7.13
- (England) Alf Parker 6.25
- (England) Ray Harker 3.88
- (Scotland) Angus McGuire 3.40
- (England) Jeff Crawford 3.04
- (England) Ray Moore 2.51
- (England) Russ Pursehouse 2.09

Glasgow

- (Scotland) Tommy Miller 10.70
- (Australia) Junior Bainbridge 9.18
- (Australia) Norman Lindsay 5.86
- (England) Frank Hodgson 6.43
- (Scotland) Ken McKinlay 6.29
- (England) Jack Hodgson 6.09
- (England) Len Nicholson 4.62
- (Scotland) Jim Blyth 4.55
- (Scotland) Alf McIntosh 4.37

Halifax

- (England) Arthur Forrest 10.30
- (England) Vic Emms 9.03
- (England) Jack Hughes 7.70
- (England) Al Allison 6.08
- (England) Bill Crosland 5.71
- (England) Ray Johnson 5.18
- (England) Dyson Harper 4.86
- (Wales) Jack Dawson 4.59
- (England) George Stringer 2.71

Hanley

- (England) Ken Adams 8.71
- (Australia) Lindsay Mitchell 7.10
- (England) Gil Blake 6.65
- (Australia) Bill Harris 6.65
- (Guernsey) Johnny Fitzparick 6.36
- (England) Brian Pritchett 6.34
- (England) Les Jenkins 6.32
- (England) Ray Harris 5.80
- (England) Bill Bridgett 1.00

Leicester

- (England) Len Williams 9.42
- (Australia) Lionel Benson 8.43
- (England) Les Beaumont 8.24
- (England) Harwood Pike 7.93
- (England) Fred Perkins 6.86
- (England) Joe Bowkis 6.55
- (Scotland) Jock Grierson 6.17
- (England) Cyril Page 5.30
- (England) Ron Wilson 4.92
- (England) Johnny Carpenter 4.65
- (England) Vic Pitcher 3.45
- (New Zealand) Laurie Holland 3.30

Liverpool

- (England) Peter Robinson 8.80
- (England) Len Read 7.83
- (England) Reg Duval 7.43
- (England) Tommy Allott 7.39
- (England) Bill Griffiths 5.75
- (England) Harry Welch 5.50
- (England) Alf Webster 5.39
- (England) George Newton 4.23
- (Australia) Buck Whitby 3.71
- (England) Peter Craven 2.40

Motherwell

- (England) Derick Close 10.18
- (Scotland) Gordon McGregor 8.86
- (Australia) Keith Gurtner 8.37
- (Australia) Noel Watson 7.48
- (England) Joe Crowther 6.32
- (England) Bill Dalton 5.50
- (England) Will Lowther 5.20
- (England) Stan Bradbury 5.00
- (Australia) Bluey Scott 4.59
- (England) Danny Lee 2.35
- (Scotland) Bob Lindsay 2.24
- (Scotland) Bill Baird 1.95

Newcastle

- (England) Derick Close 10.25
- (England) Son Mitchell 6.80
- (England) Wal Morton 6.10
- (England) Herby King 6.00
- (England) Don Wilkinson 5.49
- (Australia) Jack Chignell 5.46
- (Australia) Don Lawson 4.56
- (England) Peter Orpwood 4.45
- (England) Norman Johnson 4.20
- (England) Johnny Green 4.19
- (Australia) Ernie Brecknell (Ernest Blight) 4.00
- (England) Roy Dook 2.93
- (Canada) Mike Tams 2.91

Norwich

- (Australia) Bob Leverenz 10.84
- (England) Phil Clarke 9.50
- (England) Fred Rogers 8.38
- (England) Paddy Mills (Horace Burke) 7.91
- (England) Fred Pawson 7.82
- (England) Jack Freeman 7.73
- (Australia) Alec Hunter 7.93
- (England) Bill Codling 5.88
- (Wales) Trevor Davies 1.00

Oxford

- (England) Pat Clark 9.10
- (England) Bill Kemp 7.23
- (England) Roger Wise 7.15
- (England) Bill Osborne 7.06
- (England) Ernie Rawlins 7.03
- (England) Harry Saunders 6.62
- (New Zealand) Frank Boyle 5.53
- (England) Cyril Quick 5.52
- (England) Eric Irons 5.49
- (New Zealand) Bob McFarlane 5.35
- (England) Herby King 3.64

Sheffield (withdrew mid-season)

- (England) Guy Allott 8.60
- (England) Tommy Allott 8.00
- (England) Len Williams 7.24
- (England) Peter Orpwood 6.10
- (England) Bill Dalton 5.89
- (New Zealand) Charlie New 5.40
- (England) Johnny Green 4.40
- (England) Jack Winstanley 4.32
- (England) Les Howe 2.60

Southampton (withdrew mid-season)

- (England) Jimmy Squibb 8.71
- (England) Tom Oakley 8.71
- (England) Roy Craighead 7.43
- (England) Harold McNaughton 6.71
- (England) Charlie May 6.43
- (England) Bill Holden 6.25
- (England) Bert Croucher 5.89
- (England) Les Wotton 3.16

Walthamstow

- (England) Pete Lansdale 9.03
- (England) Harry Edwards 8.21
- (England) Jim Boyd 8.11
- (England) Reg Reeves 7.92
- (England) Benny King 7.86
- (England) Jimmy Grant 6.73
- (England) Arch Windmill 6.49
- (England) Sid Clark 4.50
- (England) Alby Smith 2.96

Yarmouth

- (England) Fred Brand 9.57
- (England) Bob Baker 9.28
- (England) Reg Morgan 6.53
- (England) Cyril Quick 5.63
- (England) Tip Mills 4.75
- (England) Vic Ridgeon 4.45
- (England) Sid Hipperson 4.23
- (England) Stan Page 3.80
- (England) Johnny White 3.70
- (England) George Flower 2.59
- (England) Alby Thomas 1.73

== See also ==
- List of United Kingdom Speedway League Champions
- Knockout Cup (speedway)
