= 1953 Speedway National League Division Two =

British motorcycle speedway season

- League: National League Division Two
- No. of competitors: 9
- Champions: Coventry Bees
- Highest average: Tommy Miller
- Division/s above: National League (Div 1)
- Division/s below: Southern League

The 1953 National League Division Two was the eighth post-war season of the second tier of motorcycle speedway in Great Britain.

== Summary ==
The League was reduced at the start of the season again to 10 teams with Oxford Cheetahs dropping down to the Southern League whilst Ashfield Giants closed and Liverpool Chads folded mid-season.

Cradley Heath disbanded following the withdrawal of the promoter Eli Sumner due to financial issues, with the team moving to join the Wolverhampton Wasps (formerly of the Southern League).

Coventry Bees clinched their first title by a single point.

Wolverhampton rider Mike Rogers died on 6 June 1953, the day after receiving critical injuries at Monmore Green Stadium racing against Liverpool. The 22-year-old lost control of his bike and fell heavily before being transported to the Royal Hospital in Wolverhampton.

== Final table ==
Pos	Team	PL	W	D	L	Pts
1	Coventry Bees	32	19	1	12	39
2	Poole Pirates	32	18	2	12	38
3	Yarmouth Bloaters	32	18	0	14	36
4	Glasgow White City Tigers	32	16	2	14	34
5	Edinburgh Monarchs	32	15	1	16	31
6	Motherwell Eagles	32	15	0	17	30
7	Wolverhampton Wasps	32	13	1	18	27
8	Leicester Hunters	32	13	1	18	27
9	Stoke Potters	32	12	2	18	26

Liverpool Chads withdrew mid-season - record expunged.

== Fixtures & results ==
=== A fixtures ===
Home \ Away	COV	ED	GLA	LEI	LIV	MOT	PP	STO	WOL	YAR
Coventry		43–41	51–33	49–35	53–31	43–1	59–25	45–39	55–29	46–38
Edinburgh	52–32		43–41	46–38	62–22	53–31	36–48	55–27	53–31	60–24
Glasgow	41–43	58–26		42–42	57–27	59–25	49–35	57–27	51–33	45–39
Leicester	32–52	43–41	44–40		48–36	43–41	42–41	51–33	48–36	53–31
Liverpool	37–46	30–54	49–35	44–40		51–33	n/a	n/a	52–32	44–40
Motherwell	53–31	39–45	41–43	50–33	n/a		49–35	56–28	42–40	54–30
Poole	46–38	50–34	58–26	58–26	55–29	63–21		63–21	62–22	56–28
Stoke	42–41	57–27	50–34	50–34	49–35	59–22	42–42		45–39	39–45
Wolverhampton	40–43	51–33	40–44	54–30	52–32	49–35	42–41	52–32		40–44
Yarmouth	53–31	41–43	57–27	62–21	58–26	61–23	54–29	51–33	56–28	

Legend: Blue = home team win; Yellow = draw; Red = away team win.

=== B fixtures ===
Home \ Away	COV	ED	GLA	LEI	LIV	MOT	PP	STO	WOL	YAR
Coventry		45–39	51–33	54–30	n/a	38–46	54–30	61–23	32–52	49–35
Edinburgh	44–39		44–40	37–47	n/a	55–28	42–42	59–25	60–24	45–39
Glasgow	57–26	55–29		54–30	n/a	52.5–31.5	46–38	64–20	49–35	62–21
Leicester	30–54	47–37	48–36		n/a	46–38	45–39	38–46	41–43	43–41
Liverpool	n/a	n/a	37–47	n/a		n/a	n/a	n/a	n/a	n/a
Motherwell	57–27	48.5–34.5	43–41	53–30	n/a		43–41	67–17	50–34	62–22
Poole	50–34	55–29	47–37	56–27	n/a	58–26		68–16	46–38	59–25
Stoke	34–50	48–36	42–42	50–34	n/a	46–38	41–43		58–26	53–31
Wolverhampton	42–42	43–41	45–39	54–30	n/a	48–36	50–34	50–34		35–49
Yarmouth	48–36	54–30	58–26	58–26	n/a	61–23	50–34	51–33	46–37	

Legend: Blue = home team win; Yellow = draw; Red = away team win.

== Top Five Riders (League only) ==
	Rider	Nat	Team	C.M.A.
1	Tommy Miller	(Scotland)	Glasgow	10.81
2	Don Cuppleditch	(England)	Edinburgh	10.36
3	Fred Brand	(England)	Yarmouth	9.97
4	Derick Close	(England)	Motherwell	9.92
5	Len Williams	(England)	Leicester	9.78

== National Trophy ==
For the National Trophy see the 1953 Speedway National League.

== Midland Cup ==
For the Midland Cup see the 1953 Speedway National League.

== Riders & final averages ==
Coventry

- (New Zealand) Charlie New 9.08
- (England) Peter Brough 8.00
- (England) Johnny Reason 7.72
- (Australia) Les Hewitt 7.71
- (England) Vic Emms 6.60
- (England) Stan Williams 6.11
- (England) Reg Duval 6.73
- (England) Derrick Tailby 6.04
- (England) Jack Wright 5.51

Edinburgh

- (England) Don Cuppleditch 10.36
- (New Zealand) Dick Campbell 8.32
- (Scotland) Bob Mark 7.38
- (England) Harold Fairhurst 7.17
- (South Africa) Roy Bester 7.05
- (England) Eddie Lack 5.89
- (England) Jeff Crawford 3.62
- (England) Wilf Jay 3.34
- (Scotland) Harry Darling 3.20
- (Scotland) Jimmy Cox 2.85

Glasgow

- (Scotland) Tommy Miller 10.81
- (Australia) Junior Bainbridge 8.04
- (Scotland) Ken McKinlay 8.94
- (Scotland) Alf McIntosh 6.67
- (New Zealand) Peter Dykes 6.18
- (Scotland) Larry Lazarus 6.11
- (England) Don Wilkinson 5.13
- (Australia) Bob Sharp 4.79
- (England) Harry Welch 4.77
- (Scotland) Doug Templeton 2.67

Leicester

- (England) Len Williams 9.78
- (England) Reg Fearman 6.20
- (England) Dennis Parker 5.71
- (England) Charlie Barsby 5.69
- (England) Alf Parker 5.56
- (England) Fred Perkins 5.48
- (England) Jack Mountford 5.33
- (England) Roy Browning 5.22
- (England) Bill Griffiths 5.04
- (England) Lionel Watling (James Goldingay) 4.81
- (England) Harwood Pike 2.56
- (England) Ivor Brown 2.10

Liverpool (withdrew)

- (England) Peter Robinson 8.69
- (England) Bill Griffiths 7.19
- (Australia) Tommy Anderson 5.81
- (England) Harry Welch 5.64
- (South Africa) Fred Wills 5.61
- (England) Gil Blake 5.57
- (England) Tommy Allott 4.84
- (England) Cyril Cooper 3.51
- (England) Stan Bradbury 2.84
- (England) Johnny Greenwood 0.31

Motherwell

- (England) Derick Close 9.92
- (Scotland) Gordon McGregor 8.55
- (England) Cyril Cooper 8.50
- (Australia) Ron Phillips 7.32
- (Australia) Noel Watson 6.92
- (England) Johnny Green 6.60
- (England) Guy Allott 5.80
- (Scotland) Scott Hall 4.77
- (Australia) Bluey Scott 4.07
- (Scotland) Jimmy Tannock 3.20

Poole

- (England) Ken Middleditch 9.59
- (England) Terry Small 9.06
- (England) Brian Crutcher 8.80
- (England) Bill Holden 7.01
- (England) Tony Lewis 7.38
- (England) Jimmy Squibb 7.63
- (England) Buster Brown 5.95
- (England) Allan Kidd 5.51
- (England) Johnny Thomson 5.18
- (England) Norman Strachan 4.00

Stoke

- (England) Ken Adams 8.44
- (England) Reg Fearman 7.90
- (England) Don Potter 7.68
- (England) Jack Hughes 7.41
- (England) Les Jenkins 6.31
- (England) Ron Peace 6.17
- (Guernsey) Johnny Fitzparick 6.08
- (South Africa) Fred Wills 5.60
- (England) Ray Harris 5.05
- (England) Bill Dalton 4.85
- (England) Alf Parker 4.00
- (England) Paddy Mills 3.71
- (England) Allan Hailstone 2.21
- (Australia) Joey Peck 1.26

Wolverhampton

- (England) Harry Bastable 8.04
- (England) Brian Shepherd 8.00
- (England) Jim Tolley 7.75
- (England) Derek Braithwaite 6.78
- (England) Ivor Davies 6.38
- (England) Eric Irons 5.77
- (England) Les Tolley 5.59
- (England) Benny King 4.54
- (England) Phil Malpass 3.17
- (England) Harry Saunders 2.86
- (Australia) Bill Jemison 2.22
- (England) Harry Wardropper 1.67

Yarmouth

- (England) Fred Brand 9.97
- (Australia) Johnny Chamberlain 8.67
- (England) Reg Reeves 8.60
- (England) Bob Baker 7.88
- (England) Danny Dunton 7.20
- (England) Roy Bowers 6.58
- (England) Ronnie Genz 5.73
- (England) Arthur Bush 5.41
- (England) Terry Courtnell 5.13
- (England) George White 4.40
- (England) Reg Morgan 3.90
- (Australia) Gundy Harris 3.18
- (England) Vic Ridgeon 4.00

== See also ==
- List of United Kingdom Speedway League Champions
- Knockout Cup (speedway)
