= 1955 Speedway National League Division Two =

British motorcycle speedway season

- League: National League Division Two
- No. of competitors: 9
- Champions: Poole Pirates
- National Trophy (Div 2 final): Poole Pirates
- Highest average: Ken McKinlay
- Division/s above: National League (Div 1)
- Division/s below: Southern League

The 1955 National League Division Two was the tenth post-war season of the second tier of motorcycle speedway in Great Britain.

== Summary ==
The only change in the list of teams that finished the previous season was the replacement of Motherwell Eagles with Weymouth Scorchers. Poole Pirates won the title.

Weymouth Scorchers withdrew after 7 league fixtures, Bristol Bulldogs withdrew after 14 after the Bulldogs promoter George Allen pulled the plug on the team citing poor attendances.

== Final table ==
Pos	Team	M	W	D	L	Pts
1	Poole Pirates	32	23	0	9	46
2	Coventry Bees	32	19	0	3	38
3	Rayleigh Rockets	32	15	2	15	32
4	Oxford Cheetahs	32	15	1	16	31
5	Southampton Saints	32	15	0	17	30
6	Ipswich Witches	32	13	3	16	29
7	Leicester Hunters	32	14	0	18	28
8	Swindon Robins	32	14	0	18	28
9	Exeter Falcons	32	13	0	29	26

- Weymouth Scorchers and Bristol Bulldogs withdrew, records expunged.

== Fixtures & results ==
=== A Fixtures ===
Home \ Away	BRI	COV	EX	IPS	LEI	OX	PP	RAY	SOT	SWI
Bristol		n/a	55–41	59–37	n/a	49–47	n/a	50–46	57–39	n/a
Coventry	60–35		58–38	57–39	50–46	66–30	55–41	51–45	58–38	52–44
Exeter	51–45	57–39		63–33	64–32	59–37	47–49	53–43	66–30	47–49
Ipswich	65–31	61–35	70–26		53–43	62–34	58–38	62–34	65–31	64–32
Leicester	48–48	61–35	57–39	53–43		63–33	47–49	61–35	59–37	55–41
Oxford	50–46	61–35	52–44	55–41	55–41		52–44	63–33	56–40	47–49
Poole	67–28	67–29	60–36	55–41	63–33	74–22		55–41	66–30	71–25
Rayleigh	49–47	50–46	64–32	48–48	56–40	44–51	45–51		55–40	55–41
Southampton	n/a	47–49	49–47	67–29	48–47	56–40	35–61	63–33		44–52
Swindon	57–39	46–50	47–49	62–33	61–35	71–25	47–49	60–36	47–49	

Legend: Blue = home team win; Yellow = draw; Red = away team win.

=== B Fixtures ===
Home \ Away	COV	EX	IPS	LEI	OX	PP	RAY	SOT	SWI
Coventry		50–46	56–40	49–47	55–41	41–54	49–47	65–51	74–22
Exeter	60–36		66–30	67–29	63–33	46–49	52–44	52–44	46–50
Ipswich	47–49	51–45		54–42	48–48	54–42	48–48	58–38	51–45
Leicester	68–28	57–39	52–44		50–45	59–37	47–48	62–33	52–44
Oxford	54–41	56–40	54–42	54–42		59–37	52–44	44–52	49–47
Poole	54–42	51–45	53–43	55–41	76–19		56–40	62–34	52–44
Rayleigh	59–36	62–34	61–35	62–34	71–25	59–37		54–42	62–34
Southampton	52–44	54–42	50–43	53–43	54–42	50–46	56–40		51–45
Swindon	42–54	53–43	49–47	55–41	60–36	61–35	41–55	49–47	

Legend: Blue = home team win; Yellow = draw; Red = away team win.

== Top Five Riders (League only) ==
	Rider	Nat	Team	C.M.A.
1	Ken McKinlay	(Scotland)	Leicester	10.48
2	Jack Geran	(Australia)	Exeter	10.38
3	Dick Bradley	(England)	Bristol/Southampton	10.25
4	Ken Middleditch	(England)	Poole	9.96
5	Neil Street	(Australia)	Exeter	9.49

== National Trophy Stage One ==
- For Stage Two - see Stage Two

The 1955 National Trophy was the 18th edition of the Knockout Cup. The Trophy consisted of two stages; stage one was for the second-tier clubs, stage two was for the top-tier clubs. Poole won stage one and qualified for second and final stage.

Division Two First round

Date	Team one	Score	Team two
23/04	Rayleigh	48-60	Poole
22/04	Bristol	62-46	Ipswich
22/04	Weymouth	49-59	Southampton
21/04	Ipswich	81-27	Bristol
19/04	Southampton	70-38	Weymouth
18/04	Poole	69-39	Rayleigh

Division Two Second round

Date	Team one	Score	Team two
23/05	Exeter	55-53	Swindon
14/05	Coventry	75-33	Oxford
14/05	Swindon	66-42	Exeter
13/05	Leicester	49-59	Southampton
12/05	Ipswich	66-41	Poole
12/05	Oxford	66-42	Coventry
10/05	Southampton	59-49	Leicester
09/05	Poole	70-37	Ipswich

Division Two semifinals

Date	Team one	Score	Team two
13/06	Poole	68-40	Swindon
04/06	Coventry	54-54	Southampton
04/06	Swindon	62-46	Poole
31/05	Southampton	56-52	Coventry

=== Division Two final ===
First leg

21 June 1955

Southampton Saints Ernie Rawlins 14 Dick Bradley 12 Brian Hanham 3 Bluey Scott 7 Alby Golden 4 Charlie May 3 Cyril Roger (guest) 2 Johnny Fitzpatrick 1	46 – 62	Poole Pirates Ken Middleditch 16 Jim Squibb 14 Norman Strachan 7 Bill Holden 7 Terry Small 7 Ernie Brecknell 6 Alan Kidd 5 Tony Lewis 0

Banister Court Stadium

Second leg

27 June 1955

Poole Pirates Terry Small 16 Bill Holden 14 Alan Kidd 11 Jim Squibb 11 Ken Middleditch 7 Norman Strachan 7 Tony Lewis 6 Fred Parkins 1	73 – 35	Southampton Saints Dick Bradley 13 Ernie Rawlins 5 Bluey Scott 5 Frank Johnson (guest) 4 Charlie May 4 Johnny Fitzpatrick 3 Alby Golden 1 Brian Hanham 0

Wimborne Road

== Midland Cup ==
For the Midland Cup see the 1955 Speedway National League.

== Riders & final averages ==
Bristol (withdrew)

- (England) Dick Bradley 10.79
- (England) Billy Hole 7.87
- (England) Jack Unstead 6.81
- (England) Frank Johnson 5.38
- (England) Danny Dunton 4.14
- (England) Geoff Pymar 3.88
- (Wales) Chris Boss 3.23
- (England) Johnny Hole 2.40
- (England) Roy Taylor 2.40
- (England) Cliff Cox 1.12

Coventry

- (Scotland) Bob Mark 8.44
- (New Zealand) Charlie New 8.34
- (Scotland) Tommy Miller 7.47
- (England) Jim Lightfoot 7.10
- (England) Vic Emms 5.59
- (England) Johnny Reason 4.99
- (England) Peter Brough 4.31
- (England) Reg Duval 4.17
- (England) Nick Nicholls 4.16

Exeter

- (Australia) Jack Geran 10.38
- (Australia) Neil Street 9.49
- (England) Goog Hoskin 6.93
- (England) Johnny Sargeant 6.40
- (England) Billy Hole 5.62
- (England) Alf Webster 4.82
- (England) John Hart 4.63
- (England) Ron Barrett 4.32
- (England) Don Hardy 3.18
- (England) Francis Cann 2.63

Ipswich

- (England) Bert Edwards 9.45
- (Australia) Junior Bainbridge 8.28
- (England) Reg Reeves 8.08
- (England) Tich Read (George Snailum) 5.91
- (Australia) Bob Sharp 5.64
- (England) Danny Dunton 4.98
- (Scotland) Larry Lazarus 4.45
- (Australia) Bluey Scott 3.84
- (England) Len Silver 3.53
- (England) Cyril Cooper 3.14
- (England) Dennis Day 2.44
- (England) Ken Last 2.10

Leicester

- (Scotland) Ken McKinlay 10.48
- (Scotland) Gordon McGregor 7.26
- (England) Derick Close 6.71
- (England) Len Williams 6.29
- (England) Johnny Green 5.82
- (England) Charlie Barsby 5.10
- (Australia) Ron Phillips 4.82
- (England) Barry East 2.74

Oxford

- (England) Ronnie Genz 8.15
- (England) Bob Baker 7.47
- (England) Peter Robinson 7.39
- (England) Reg Trott 6.40
- (New Zealand) Bill Thatcher 5.86
- (England) Dennis Newton 5.44
- (England) Bob Wells 4.42
- (England) Kid Curtis 3.33
- (England) Maury Courtnell 1.82

Poole

- (England) Ken Middleditch 9.96
- (England) Bill Holden 8.54
- (England) Allan Kidd 7.22
- (England) Terry Small 7.14
- (England) Johnny Thomson 6.67
- (England) Jimmy Squibb 6.57
- (England) Tony Lewis 6.50
- (England) Norman Strachan 5.89
- (Australia) Ernie Brecknell (Ernest Blight) 3.73

Rayleigh

- (England) Jack Unstead 9.32
- (New Zealand) Peter Clark 8.99
- (England) Les McGillivray 7.69
- (England) Gerry Jackson 6.88
- (England) Pete Lansdale 6.57
- (England) Maury McDermott 5.26
- (England) Dennis Gray 4.55
- (Australia) Bill Longley 3.50
- (England) Frank Bettis 3.16
- (England) Eric Ebbs 2.86

Southampton

- (England) Dick Bradley 9.84
- (England) Ernie Rawlins 7.48
- (England) Brian Hanham 7.39
- (England) Charlie May 5.71
- (Australia) Bluey Scott 5.35
- (England) Maury Mattingley 5.30
- (Guernsey) Johnny Fitzparick 5.27
- (England) Alby Golden 5.17
- (Australia) Allan Quinn 4.74

Swindon

- (England) Bob Roger 8.81
- (England) George White 8.61
- (Wales) Ian Williams 8.16
- (England) Jimmy Gooch 6.98
- (England) Ron Swaine 5.76
- (England) Danny Malone 4.93
- (England) Bob Jones 3.41
- (England) Ray Harris 4.37
- (England) Ernie Lessiter 3.24

Weymouth (withdrew)

- (England) Ron Barrett 7.50
- (Australia) Ernie Brecknell (Ernest Blight) 6.86
- (England) Ken Adams 5.83
- (England) Danny Dunton 5.53
- (England) Frank Johnson 4.88
- (England) Ernie Lessiter 3.29
- (England) Gerald Pugh 2.15
- (England) Roy Bowers 1.82

== See also ==
List of United Kingdom Speedway League Champions
