= Scotland national speedway team =

Scottish national motorcycle speedway team

Scotland
- SWC Wins: 0 Best result World Pairs finalists (1970, 1971)

The Scotland national speedway team were one of the teams that competed in international team motorcycle speedway. Scottish riders now compete for the Great Britain team.

== History ==
The Scotland speedway team first competed in international competition in test matches during 1928. They continued to hold test matches every decade until their pool of riders diminished during the mid-1980s.

The team competed as a stand-alone nation four times at the Speedway World Team Cup, first at the 1974 Speedway World Team Cup, finishing third in British qualification round. Then again in 1975, 1976 and 1977. Previously in the World Team Cup from 1960 to 1969, any Scottish rider was eligible to represent Great Britain. This was also the case after their fourth appearance in 1977, although controversially some riders would also ride under the English flag.

Scotland's best achievement came in reaching the final of the Speedway World Pairs Championship in 1970 and 1971, a competition they competed in from 1969 to 1976.

== Major world finals ==
=== World Pairs Championship ===
| Year | Venue | Standings (Pts) | Riders | Pts |
|---|---|---|---|---|
| 1970 | (Sweden); Malmö; Malmö Stadion | 1. New Zealand (28); 2. Sweden (25); 3. England (19); 4. Scotland (18); 5. Czechoslovakia (11); 6. (Socialist Federal Republic of Yugoslavia) Yugoslavia (7); 7. Denmark (nc) | Jim McMillan | 10 |
| 1970 | (Sweden); Malmö; Malmö Stadion | 1. New Zealand (28); 2. Sweden (25); 3. England (19); 4. Scotland (18); 5. Czechoslovakia (11); 6. (Socialist Federal Republic of Yugoslavia) Yugoslavia (7); 7. Denmark (nc) | Bert Harkins | 8 |
| 1971 | (Poland); Rybnik; Rybnik Municipal Stadium | 1. Poland (30); 2. New Zealand (25); 3. Sweden (22); 4. Czechoslovakia (17); 5. Scotland (16); 6. (Socialist Federal Republic of Yugoslavia) Yugoslavia (10); 7. Austria (6) | Jim McMillan | 11 |
| 1971 | (Poland); Rybnik; Rybnik Municipal Stadium | 1. Poland (30); 2. New Zealand (25); 3. Sweden (22); 4. Czechoslovakia (17); 5. Scotland (16); 6. (Socialist Federal Republic of Yugoslavia) Yugoslavia (10); 7. Austria (6) | George Hunter | 5 |
| 1976 | (Sweden); Eskilstuna; Snälltorpet | 1. England (27); 2. Denmark (24); 3. Sweden (22); 4. Australia (16); 5. New Zealand (15); 6. Scotland (12); 7. Poland (10) | Jim McMillan | 10 |
| 1976 | (Sweden); Eskilstuna; Snälltorpet | 1. England (27); 2. Denmark (24); 3. Sweden (22); 4. Australia (16); 5. New Zealand (15); 6. Scotland (12); 7. Poland (10) | George Hunter | 2 |

== International caps ==
Since the advent of the Speedway Grand Prix era, international caps earned by riders is largely restricted to international competitions, whereas previously test matches between two teams were a regular occurrence. The list of caps includes Scottish select matches.

| Rider | Caps |
|---|---|
| Brady, Alistair | 1 |
| Beaton, Bobby | 15 |
| Beaton, Jim | 4 |
| Beaton, Mick | 3 |
| Burnett, Eric | 2 |
| Caffrey, Colin | 4 |
| Campbell, Andy | 1 |
| Collins, Brian | 13 |
| Darling, Ian | 1 |
| Duncan, Harry | 1 |
| Gallacher, Jim | 7 |
| Gilbertson, Ross | 4 |
| Grierson, Jock | 1 |
| Harkins, Bert | 19 |
| Hunter, George | 28 |
| Lambert, Roger | 2 |
| Landels Bill | 3 |
| Lawson, Steve | 2 |
| Lazarus, Larry | 2 |
| MacLean, Harry | 4 |
| MacKenzie, George | 2 |
| McDermott, Steve | 2 |
| McGregor, Gordon | 10 |
| McKinlay, Ken | 23 |
| McKinna, Charlie | 9 |
| McKinna, Kenny | 1 |
| McMillan, Bill | 4 |
| McMillan, Jim | 19 |
| McQueen, Drew | 4 |
| Mark, Bob | 7 |
| Meldrum, Andy | 8 |
| Michie, Lawrence | 1 |
| Miller, Tommy | 18 |
| Reid, Andy | 5 |
| Robertson, Wattie | 5 |
| Rourke, Benny | 3 |
| Stewart, Len | 1 |
| Tannock, Jimmy | 1 |
| Templeton, Doug | 22 |
| Templeton, Willie | 25 |
| Trownson, Dave | 1 |
| Waite, Peter | 1 |
| Wilson, Ian | 2 |
| Wilson, John | 5 |
| Wilson, Willie | 12 |
