= Jim McMillan (speedway rider) =

British speedway rider

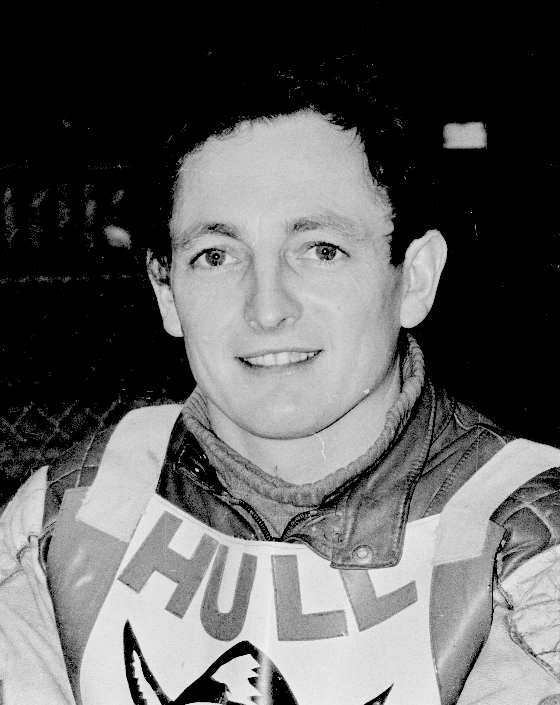
- Born: 3 December 1945 (age 80); Glasgow, Scotland
- Nationality: British (Scottish)

Career history
- 1966-1972, 1983: Glasgow Tigers
- 1973: Coatbridge Tigers
- 1974-1975: Hull Vikings
- 1976-1980: Wolverhampton Wolves
- 1981-1982: Belle Vue Aces
- 1984-1986: Berwick Bandits
- 1984: Oxford Cheetahs

Team honours
- 1982: British League Champion

James Dunn Templeton McMillan (born 3 December 1945), better known as Jim McMillan or Jimmy McMillan, is a retired Scottish motorcycle speedway rider. He earned 4 caps for the Scotland national speedway team, 31 caps for the Great Britain national speedway team and 28 caps for the England national speedway team.

== Biography ==
Born in Glasgow, McMillan worked as a sheet metal worker and took up speedway at the training school at Cowdenbeath in early 1966, following in the footsteps of two of his uncles who were also speedway riders - Doug Templeton and Willie Templeton. Later that year he broke into the Glasgow team in the British League and went on to average 3.54 points from thirteen matches. He rode more regularly in 1967 and added over a point to his average. He continued to progress in 1968, raising his average to 8.31, with three full maximum scores during the season. This led to his selection for the Great Britain team in the test series against Sweden, and also for the British Lions team that toured Australia in the Winter of 1968/1969. He went on to represent the British Lions 41 times, Great Britain 16 times, and Scotland in 31 matches (including captaining Scotland in the country's first ever match against Australia in 1969). In both the 1969 and 1970 seasons he averaged over ten points per match, and he captained the Tigers team. In 1972, he rode as a reserve in the World Final. After moving with the team to Coatbridge in 1973, he moved to Hull Vikings the following year and after two successful seasons for the club moved on to Wolverhampton Wolves in 1976, going on to ride for the team for five years. In 1981 he signed for Belle Vue Aces. With his average down to 5.44 at the end of the 1982 season he dropped down to the National League with Glasgow despite an attempt by Birmingham to sign him, averaging 9.85 in the lower division. Three seasons followed with Berwick Bandits before he retired at the end of the 1986 season.

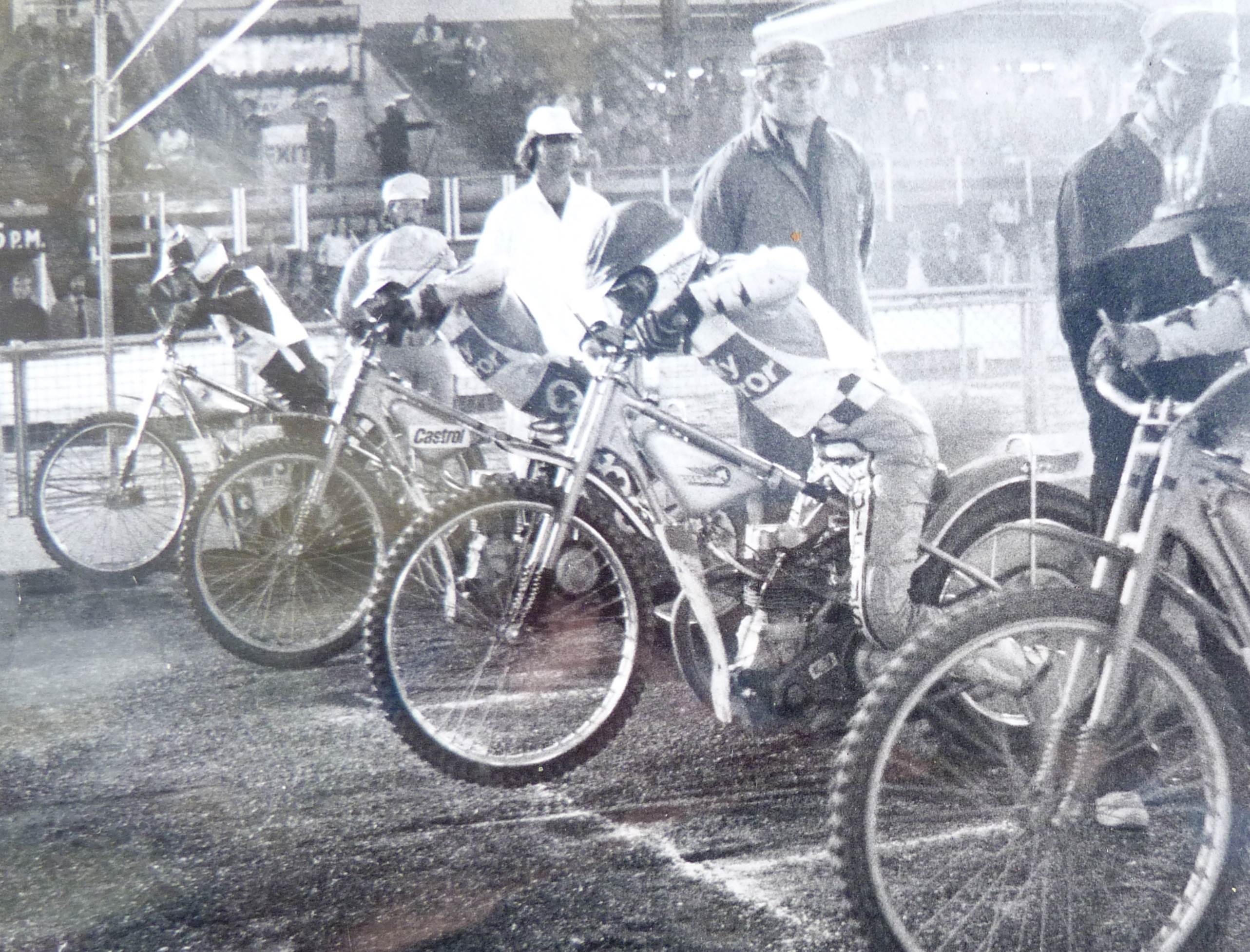
Heat 11, Grand Prix Final, White City. L-R Jim McMillan, Peter Collins, Kevin Holden, Billy Sanders

McMillan rode in the British League Riders' Championship five times between 1969 and 1974, his best finish a third place in 1971.

As well as riding in British speedway, McMillan rode in New Zealand, Poland, Norway, Sweden, Denmark, the United States, and Australia, where he finished as runner-up in the Queensland Championship in 1969/70.

After retiring from the sport, McMillan worked as a machine examiner and a Technical Adviser to the Speedway Control Bureau.

== World Final appearances ==
=== Individual World Championship ===
- 1972 - (England) London, Wembley Stadium - Reserve - 2pts

=== World Pairs Championship ===
- 1970 - (Sweden) Malmö, Malmö Stadion (with Bert Harkins) - 4th - 18pts (10)
- 1971 - (Poland) Rybnik, Rybnik Municipal Stadium (with George Hunter) - 5th - 16pts (11)
- 1976 - (Sweden) Eskilstuna, Snälltorpet (with George Hunter) - 6th - 12pts (10)
