= George Hunter (speedway rider) =

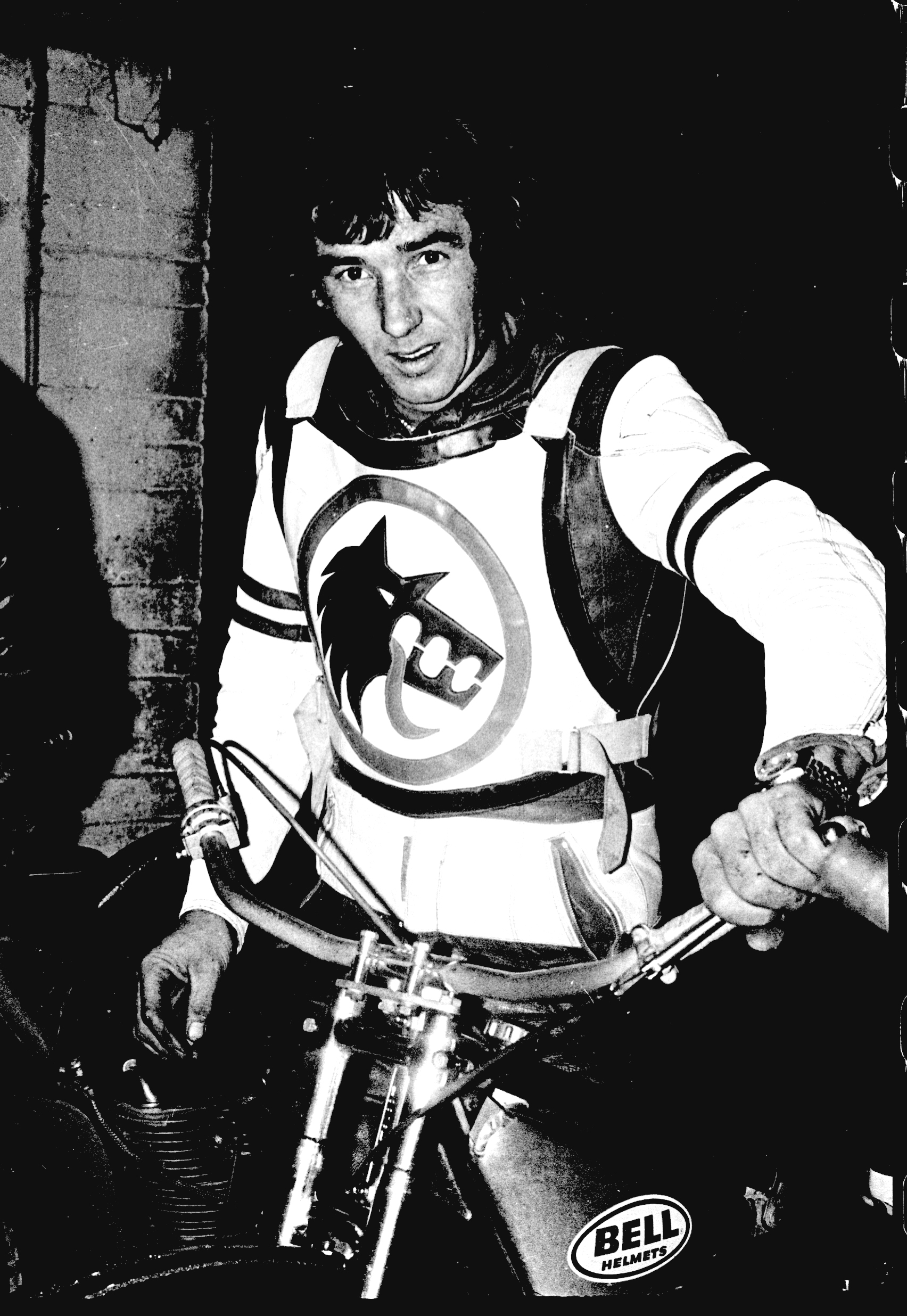
- Born: 30 January 1939; Ladybank, Fife, Scotland
- Died: 11 May 1999 (aged 60)
- Nationality: British (Scottish)

Career history
- 1958: Lanarkshire Eagles
- 1960-1967, 1980-1981, 1983: Edinburgh Monarchs
- 1968-1969: Coatbridge Monarchs
- 1970: Newcastle Diamonds
- 1971-1972: Glasgow Tigers
- 1972-1977, 1979-1980: Wolverhampton Wolves
- 1978-1979: Oxford Cheetahs
- 1982: Berwick Bandits

Individual honours
- 1964: Scottish Open Champion

Team honours
- 1973: Midland Cup
- 1981: National League KO Cup winner

George Hunter (30 January 1939 – 11 May 1999) was a motorcycle speedway rider. He earned 28 caps for the Scotland national speedway team, 17 international caps for the England national speedway team and 16 caps for the Great Britain team.

== Career ==
Hunter's early career was on grass. He joined Motherwell Speedway team in 1958 and moved to Edinburgh Monarchs in 1960. Known as the "Ladybank Express", he rode in 360 league matches for the Monarchs over his lifetime career.

In 1963, Hunter was leading the former world champion Peter Craven in the final race of a challenge match between Edinburgh and Belle Vue at Old Meadowbank when his engine seized. After taking evasive action Craven may have clipped Hunter's wheel before crashing through the fence and suffering fatal injuries.

Hunter narrowly missed out on being the 1963 Provincial League Riders Champion, suffering an engine failure while leading in the final. Ivan Mauger took the title.

Edinburgh became the Coatbridge Monarchs for the 1968 and 1969 seasons before Hunter left the club to join Newcastle Diamonds in 1970. In 1971, Newcastle dropped out of the league and most of Newcastle's riders were allocated to Reading Racers but Hunter along with Russ Dent and Mike Watkin were left without a club. Hunter switched to the Glasgow Tigers for 1971 and 1972 and completed two seasons with significant averages of 8.29 and 8.41 respectively.

Having been part of the Midland Cup winning Wolverhampton Wolves in 1973, Hunter might have expected to win it again in 1975 when Wolves only lost to Oxford Rebels by two points away and might have expected to win at home and thereby win on aggregate. However, Hunter was not present for the second leg at Monmore Green, Wolves lost at home by one point and on aggregate by three.

In 1976, Hunter was a British Finalist for the third time, having previously reached the final in 1966 and 1967.

Hunter retired in 1983.

== Personal life ==
Hunter was born in Ladybank, Fife, Scotland. He and his wife, Barbara, have a daughter, Natalie, and two sons, Scott and Gillian, from his first marriage. He died of cancer in 1999.

== World Final appearances ==
=== World Pairs Championship ===
- 1971 - (Poland) Rybnik, Rybnik Municipal Stadium (with Jim McMillan) - 5th - 16pts (5)
- 1976 - (Sweden) Eskilstuna, Eskilstuna Motorstadion (with Jim McMillan) - 6th - 12pts (2)
