= Parkneuk Sports Stadium =

Former Scottish sports venue

- Location: Milton Street, Motherwell, North Lanarkshire, Scotland
- Coordinates: 55°47′50″N 3°59′30″W
- Opened: 1949
- Closed: 1972

Parkneuk Sports Stadium was a greyhound racing and speedway track on Milton Street, Motherwell, North Lanarkshire, Scotland.

== History ==
The track was situated west of Milton Street and built in 1949, on the site of the Parkneuk Colliery pit numbers 1 and 2. It also went by the name of The Stadium and the Lanarkshire Speedway and Sports Stadium. The greyhound racing was independent (unaffiliated to a governing body) and opened on 15 October 1949.

In March 1950 the Speedway Control Board granted a licence for the Motherwell Eagles speedway team, despite the licence initially being refused. The stadium was designed with speedway in mind; the bends wide enough for six cars side by side The speedway supporters club numbered 6,000.

The stadium (in terms of greyhound racing) competed for many years with another independent greyhound track called the Clyde Valley Greyhound Track at the bottom of Airbles Road.

Greyhound racing ended in 1972 and the site today consists of the Daisy Park Community Centre and Our Lady of Good Aid Cathedral Primary School.

== See also ==
- Motherwell Eagles
