= 1971 Speedway World Pairs Championship =

4th edition of the World motorcycle speedway Pairs Championship

1971 World Pairs Championship

Seasons
- ← 1970 1972 →

The 1971 Speedway World Pairs Championship was the second FIM Speedway World Pairs Championship. The final took place on 11 July 1971 in Rybnik, Poland. The championship was won by Poland (maximum 30 points) who beat New Zealand (25 points) and Sweden (22 points).

== Semifinal 1 ==
- (Socialist Federal Republic of Yugoslavia) Matija Gubec Stadium, Krško
- 20 May

Pos.	Team	Rider	Points
1st	Czechoslovakia (? pts)	Václav Verner	?
1st	Czechoslovakia (? pts)	Pavel Mareš	?
2nd	Yugoslavia (? pts)	Ivan Molan	?
2nd	Yugoslavia (? pts)	Draško Oršic	?
3rd	Austria (23 pts)	Gunther Walla	16
3rd	Austria (23 pts)	Josef Haider	7
4	? (? pts)	?	?
4	? (? pts)	?	?
5	? (? pts)	?	?
5	? (? pts)	?	?
6	? (? pts)	?	?
6	? (? pts)	?	?
7	? (? pts)	?	?
7	? (? pts)	?	?

== Semifinal 2 ==
- (England) Leicester Stadium, Leicester
- 20 June

Pos.	Team	Rider	Points
1st	New Zealand (24 pts)	Ivan Mauger	16
1st	New Zealand (24 pts)	Barry Briggs	8
2nd	Sweden (22 pts)	Anders Michanek	16
2nd	Sweden (22 pts)	Sören Sjösten	6
3rd	Scotland (20 pts)	George Hunter	11
3rd	Scotland (20 pts)	Jim McMillan	9
4	England (19 pts)	Ray Wilson	13
4	England (19 pts)	Martin Ashby	6
5	Australia (17 pts)	John Boulger	10
5	Australia (17 pts)	Jim Airey	7
6	Norway (13 pts)	Reidar Eide	11
6	Norway (13 pts)	Øyvind S. Berg	2
7	Denmark (11 pts)	Ole Olsen	10
7	Denmark (11 pts)	Bent Nørregaard-Jensen	1

== World final ==
- (Poland) Rybnik Municipal Stadium, Rybnik
- 11 July 1971
- Referee: (West Germany) Georg Traunsburger

Placing	Pair / Rider Name	Total	1	2	3	4	5	6	7	8	9	10	11	12	13	14	15	16	17	18	19	20	21
1	Poland	30							10							20							30
1	(1) Andrzej Wyglenda	15	3			3				2			2				2			3
1	(2) Jerzy Szczakiel	15	2			2				3			3				3			2
2	New Zealand	25							10							19							25
2	(9) Ivan Mauger	12			3			2				1		3			0					3
2	(10) Barry Briggs	13			2			3				3		2			1					2
3	Sweden	22							6							13							22
3	(13) Anders Michanek	13				N			2			2				3			3		3
3	(14) Bernt Persson	9				1			3			0				2			2		1
4	Czechoslovakia	17							6							12							17
4	(3) Václav Verner	9	0				3				2			1				1			2
4	(4) Pavel Mareš	8	1				2				3			0				2			0
5	Scotland	16							2							8							16
5	(11) Jim McMillan	11			1				0				1		3			3					3
5	(12) George Hunter	5			0				1				N		2			0					2
6	Yugoslavia	10							6							8							10
6	(5) Ivan Molan	5		3			N			0					1				N			1
6	(6) Drasco Orsic	5		2			1			1					0				1			0
7	Austria	6							2							4							6
7	(7) Josef Haider	4		0				1			0					1				1			1
7	(8) Meinz Zimmerman	2		1				0			1					0				0			0
Placing	Pair / Rider Name	Total	1	2	3	4	5	6	7	8	9	10	11	12	13	14	15	16	17	18	19	20	21

m - exclusion for exceeding two minute time allowance • t - exclusion for touching the tapes • x - other exclusion • e - retired or mechanical failure • f - fell
ns - non-starter • nc - non-classify

gate A - inside	gate B	gate C	gate D - outside

Notes:

Two Poles Antoni Woryna (No. 15) and Jan Mucha (No. 16) were track reserves, but they did not start.

== See also ==
- 1971 Individual Speedway World Championship
- 1971 Speedway World Team Cup
- motorcycle speedway
- 1971 in sports
