= Midland Riders' Championship =

British motorcycle speedway competition

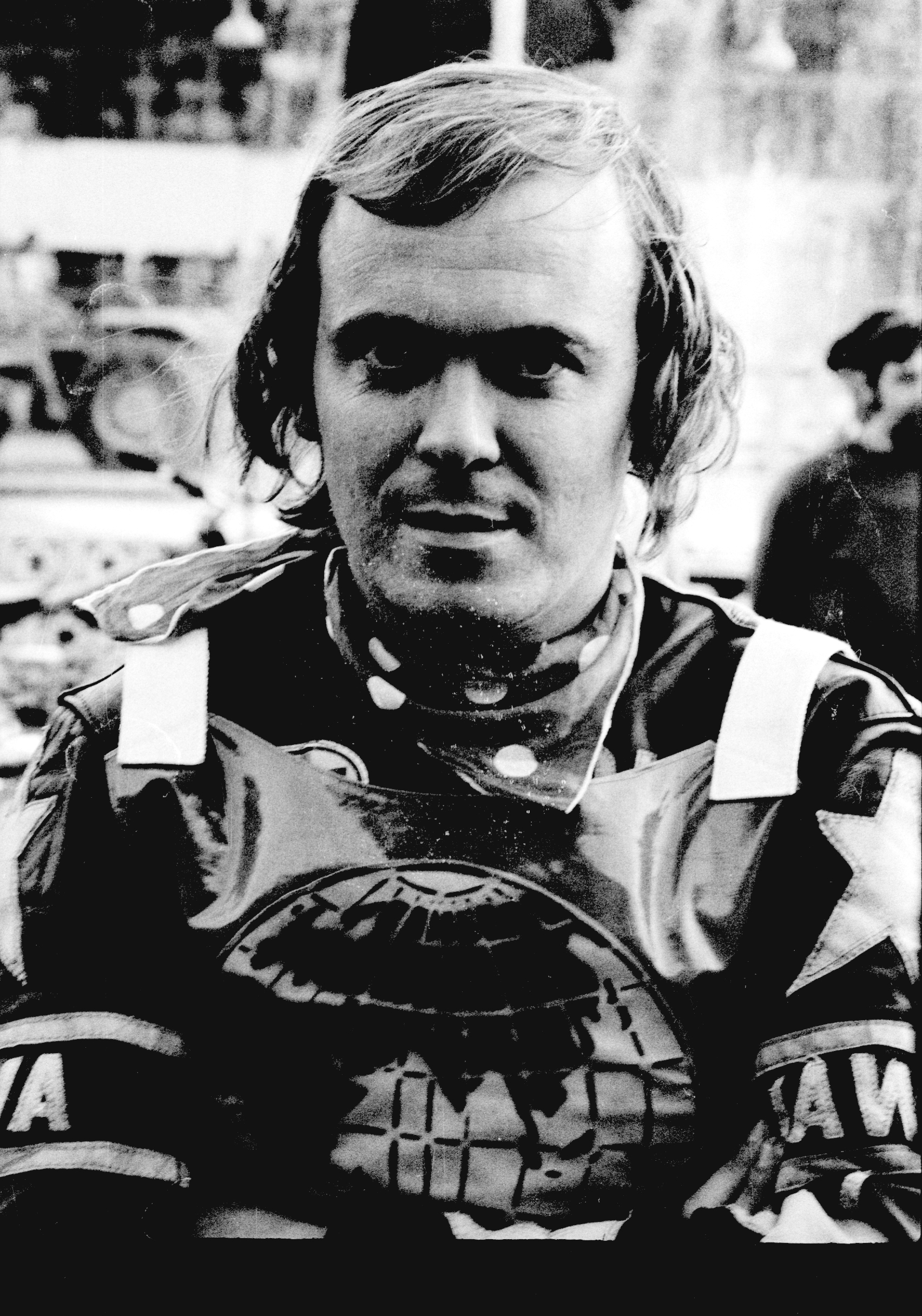
- Ole Olsen five times champion
- Sport: motorcycle speedway
- Founded: 1952
- Folded: 1987
- Country: United Kingdom

The Midland Riders' Championship was an individual speedway competition for top riders of teams from the Midlands.

== History ==
The Midland Riders' Championship was introduced in 1952. It was restricted to the riders who represented teams from the Midlands area. The competition was a significant competition at the time, due to the speedway teams from the Midlands being some of the leading teams in the United Kingdom (particularly in the 1980s) when Oxford, Coventry and Cradley Heath dominated UK speedway.

== Past winners ==
| Year | Winner | Team | Venue | Ref |
| 1952 | Len Williams ( (England) ) | Leicester Hunters | Leicester Stadium | |
| 1953 | Graham Warren ( (Australia) ) | Birmingham Brummies | Brandon Stadium | |
| 1954 | Ron Mountford ( (England) ) | Birmingham Brummies | Birchfield Ladbroke Stadium | |
| 1955 | Ken McKinlay ( (Scotland) ) | Leicester Hunters | Leicester Stadium | |
| 1956 | Ken McKinlay ( (Scotland) ) | Leicester Hunters | Brandon Stadium | |
| 1957 not staged due to consequences of the Suez Crisis | | | | |
| 1958 | Jack Geran ( (Australia) ) | Leicester Hunters | Oxford Stadium | |
| 1959 | Ken McKinlay ( (Scotland) ) | Leicester Hunters | Leicester Stadium | |
| 1960 | Henryk Żyto ( (Poland) ) | Coventry Bees | Brandon Stadium | |
| 1961 | Jack Geran ( (Australia) ) | Leicester Hunters | Abbey Stadium | |
| 1962 | Nigel Boocock ( (England) ) | Coventry Bees | Brandon Stadium | |
| 1963 | Arne Pander ( (Denmark) ) | Oxford Cheetahs | Oxford Stadium | |
| 1964 | Barry Briggs ( (New Zealand) ) | Swindon Robins | Oxford Stadium | |
| 1965 not included in the calendar | | | | |
| 1966 | Barry Briggs ( (New Zealand) ) | Swindon Robins | Brandon Stadium | |
| 1967 | Barry Briggs ( (New Zealand) ) | Swindon Robins | Brandon Stadium | |
| 1968 | Nigel Boocock ( (England) ) | Coventry Bees | Brandon Stadium | |
| 1969 | Norman Hunter ( (England) ) | Wolverhampton Wolves | Brandon Stadium | |
| 1970 | Barry Briggs ( (New Zealand) ) | Swindon Robins | Brandon Stadium | |
| 1971 | Ole Olsen ( (Denmark) ) | Wolverhampton Wolves | Brandon Stadium | |
| 1972 | Ole Olsen ( (Denmark) ) | Wolverhampton Wolves | Brandon Stadium | |
| 1973 | John Boulger ( (Australia) ) | Leicester Lions | Brandon Stadium | |
| 1974 | Dave Jessup ( (England) ) | Leicester Lions | Brandon Stadium | |
| 1975 | Ole Olsen ( (Denmark) ) | Wolverhampton Wolves | Brandon Stadium | |
| 1976 | Ole Olsen ( (Denmark) ) | Coventry Bees | Brandon Stadium | |
| 1977 final not staged due to bad weather | | | | |
| 1978 | Ole Olsen ( (Denmark) ) | Coventry Bees | Brandon Stadium | |
| 1979 | Hans Nielsen ( (Denmark) ) | Wolverhampton Wolves | Brandon Stadium | |
| 1980 | Scott Autrey ( (United States) ) | Swindon Robins | Brandon Stadium | |
| 1981 | Erik Gundersen ( (Denmark) ) | Cradley Heathens | Brandon Stadium | |
| 1982 | Erik Gundersen ( (Denmark) ) | Cradley Heathens | Brandon Stadium | |
| 1983 | Erik Gundersen ( (Denmark) ) | Cradley Heathens | Brandon Stadium | |
| 1984 | Lance King ( (United States) ) | Cradley Heathens | Brandon Stadium | |
| 1985 | Hans Nielsen ( (Denmark) ) | Oxford Cheetahs | Brandon Stadium | |
| 1986 | Tommy Knudsen ( (Denmark) ) | Coventry Bees | Oxford Stadium | |
