= Clyde Valley Greyhound Track =

Greyhound racing track in Motherwell, Scotland

- Location: Airbles Road, Motherwell, North Lanarkshire, Scotland
- Coordinates: 55°47′04″N 4°00′28″W
- Opened: 1932
- Closed: 1959

Clyde Valley Greyhound Track was a greyhound racing track on Airbles Road, Motherwell, North Lanarkshire, Scotland.

The racecourse was situated between Airbles Road and Hamilton Road on the edge of Logans Plantation (now Strathclyde Country Park). The sports ground opened to greyhound racing on 22 July 1932 and was independent (unaffiliated to a governing body). Boxing events and Speedway also took place here at various times. The final meeting took place in December 1959. It competed for many years with another independent track called the Parkneuk Sports Stadium on Milton Street.

The site became a bus depot which has since been demolished and is due to be replaced by a housing development.
