= 1976 Speedway World Pairs Championship =

7th official edition of the World motorcycle speedway Pairs Championship

1976 World Pairs Championship

Seasons
- ← 1975 1977 →

The 1976 Speedway World Pairs Championship was the seventh FIM Speedway World Pairs Championship. The final took place in Eskilstuna, Sweden. The championship was won by host England (27 points) who beat Denmark (24 points) and Sweden (22 points).

== Semifinal 1 ==
- (West Germany) Motodrom Halbemond, Norden
- 6 June

Placing	Pair / Rider Name	Total	1	2	3	4	5	6	7	8	9	10	11	12	13	14	15	16	17	18	19	20	21
1	Denmark	27							8							17							27
1	(13) Ole Olsen	16				3			1			3				3			3		3
1	(14) Finn Thomsen	11				2			2			1				2			2		2
2	New Zealand	25							9							19							25
2	(3) Ivan Mauger	14	3				3				2			3				3			0
2	(4) Barry Briggs	11	1				2				3			2				2			1
3	Australia	23							10							13							23
3	(9) Phil Crump	15			3			3				2		1			3					3
3	(10) John Boulger	8			2			2				0		E			2					2
4	West Germany	16							6							14							16
4	(5) Christoph Betzl	10		2			1			3					3				1			F
4	(6) Wilhelm Duden	6		3			0			1					1				X			1
5	Netherlands	13							4							9							13
5	(11) Henny Kroeze	13			1				3				3		2			1					3
5	(12) Frits Konning	0			0				E				0		0			0					0
6	Norway	10							2							4							10
6	(7) Dag Lövaas	6		0				1			1					1				3			0
6	(8) Reidar Eide	4		1				0			0					0				1			2
7	Finland	11							3							8							11
7	(1) Ila Teromaa	10	2			1				2			2				1			2
7	(2) Markku Helminen	1	0			0				0			1				0			0
Placing	Pair / Rider Name	Total	1	2	3	4	5	6	7	8	9	10	11	12	13	14	15	16	17	18	19	20	21

m - exclusion for exceeding two minute time allowance • t - exclusion for touching the tapes • x - other exclusion • e - retired or mechanical failure • f - fell
ns - non-starter • nc - non-classify

gate A - inside	gate B	gate C	gate D - outside

== Semifinal 2 ==
- (Hungary) Borsod Volán Stadion, Miskolc
- 6 June

Pos.	Team	Rider	Points
1st	England (30 pts)	John Louis	?
1st	England (30 pts)	Malcolm Simmons	?
2nd	Scotland (27 pts)	George Hunter	?
2nd	Scotland (27 pts)	Jim McMillan	?
3rd	Poland (22 pts)	Edward Jancarz	?
3rd	Poland (22 pts)	Jerzy Rembas	?
4	Hungary (17 pts)	?	?
4	Hungary (17 pts)	?	?
5	Italy (15 pts)	?	?
5	Italy (15 pts)	?	?
6	Yugoslavia (9 pts)	?	?
6	Yugoslavia (9 pts)	?	?
7	Austria (8 pts)	?	?
7	Austria (8 pts)	?	?

== World final ==
- (Sweden) Snälltorpet, Eskilstuna
- 17 June

Placing	Pair / Rider Name	Total	1	2	3	4	5	6	7	8	9	10	11	12	13	14	15	16	17	18	19	20	21
1	England	27							9							18							27
1	(9) John Louis	17			3			3				2		3			3					3
1	(10) Malcolm Simmons	10			2			1				3		1			2					1
2	Denmark	24							9							19							24
2	(5) Ole Olsen	16		3			2			3					3				3			2
2	(6) Finn Thomsen	8		1			3			2					2				E			0
3	Sweden	22							9							14							22
3	(13) Bengt Jansson	11				1			3			0				3			2		2
3	(14) Bernt Persson	11				3			2			1				1			1		3
4	Australia	16							7							13							16
4	(1) Phil Crump	10	3			2				1			3				1			0
4	(2) Billy Sanders	6	2			0				0			2				0			2
5	New Zealand	15							4							7							15
5	(7) Ivan Mauger	8		0				E			E					2				3			3
5	(8) Barry Briggs	7		2				2			1					0				1			1
6	Scotland	12							2							9							12
6	(3) Jim McMillan	10	1				1				3			2				2			1
6	(4) George Hunter	2	0				0				2			0				0			0
7	Poland	10							2							4							10
7	(11) Edward Jancarz	7			1				1				0		0			3					2
7	(12) Zenon Plech	3			0				0				1		1			1					E
Placing	Pair / Rider Name	Total	1	2	3	4	5	6	7	8	9	10	11	12	13	14	15	16	17	18	19	20	21

m - exclusion for exceeding two minute time allowance • t - exclusion for touching the tapes • x - other exclusion • e - retired or mechanical failure • f - fell
ns - non-starter • nc - non-classify

gate A - inside	gate B	gate C	gate D - outside

== See also ==
- 1976 Individual Speedway World Championship
- 1976 Speedway World Team Cup
- motorcycle speedway
- 1976 in sports
