= 1947 Speedway National League Division Three =

British motorcycle speedway season

- League: National League Division Three
- Season: 1947
- No. of competitors: 8
- Champions: Eastbourne Eagles
- Midlands vs. South Cup: Tamworth Hounds
- Highest average: Peter Robinson
- Division/s above: Division One; Division Two

The 1947 National League Division Three was the inaugural season of British speedway's National League Division Three Speedway in 1947 was restricted in terms of fixtures and attendances following the fallout from World War II.

With several new teams joining British Speedway in 1947, a third league tier was created for the first time. The new teams included the Cradley Heath Cubs, racing at Dudley Wood Stadium, Hanley Potters following an eight-year absence from British speedway and Exeter Falcons after a lease was signed by Motor Sports (Exeter) Ltd (led by Frank Buckland) with the landlords County Athletic Ground Company.

Eastbourne Eagles won the title in their first season of league speedway.

Peter Robinson of Southampton topped the averages.

== Final table ==
Pos	Team	P	W	D	L	F	A	Pts	Diff
1	Eastbourne Eagles	28	18	0	10	1260	1057	36	+203
2	Cradley Heath Cubs	28	18	0	10	1215	1116	36	+99
3	Southampton Saints	28	17	1	10	1113	1197	35	-84
4	Exeter Falcons	28	15	0	13	1193.5	1131.5	30	+62
5	Tamworth Hounds	28	12	0	16	1159	1179	24	-20
6	Hanley Potters	28	12	0	16	1113	1197	24	-84
7	Wombwell Colliers	28	12	0	16	1100	1225	24	-125
8	Plymouth Devils	28	7	1	20	995	1330	15	-335

=== A fixtures ===
Home \ Away	CH	EAS	EX	HAN	PLY	SOT	TAM	WOM
Cradley Heath		50–34	50–34	49–34	54–30	47–37	44–40	46–36
Eastbourne	58–24		49–32	55–29	56–27	35–46	54–27	51–33
Exeter	57–26	50–32		62–20	55–28	43–41	56–28	50–31
Hanley	41–43	43–40	49–33		59–23	43–40	49–34	47–33
Plymouth	40–42	30–54	40–43	41–42		39–44	41–43	43–40
Southampton	53–30	39–44	47.5–36.5	55–27	49–34		55–29	57–27
Tamworth	41–43	40–44	48–36	54–30	44–38	41–42		48–35
Wombwell	47–37	46–37	48–35	44–38	54–30	37–47	50–34	

Legend: Blue = home team win; Yellow = draw; Red = away team win.

=== B fixtures ===
Home \ Away	CH	EAS	EX	HAN	PLY	SOT	TAM	WOM
Cradley Heath		59–25	61–22	59–23	62–22	57–27	35–48	59–25
Eastbourne	55–28		50–33	48–32	52–29	48–34	44–39	52–30
Exeter	62–22	47–37		52–31	53–30	53–31	47–37	43–41
Hanley	37–47	36–46	54–23		63–20	57–26	35–49	45–36
Plymouth	45–33	47–37	44–40	47–36		42–42	44–40	54–29
Southampton	59–24	51–33	55–29	61–23	62–22		48–35	53–31
Tamworth	41–43	33–50	50–34	46–38	54–29	50–34		54–30
Wombwell	43–41	43–40	51–33	40–44	48–36	41–39	51–32	

Legend: Blue = home team win; Yellow = draw; Red = away team win.

== Leading averages ==
	Rider	Team	C.M.A.
1	Peter Robinson	Southampton	10.57
2	Cyril Roger	Exeter	10.34
3	Wally Green	Eastbourne	10.20
4	Basil Harris	Eastbourne	9.54
5	Bob Oakley	Southampton	9.37

== Midlands v. South Cup ==
Midlands Group

Home \ Away	CH	HAN	TAM	WOM
Cradley Heath		64–32	47–49	–
Hanley	55–39		48–48	64–32
Tamworth	54–42	60–35		49–35
Wombwell	45–51	40–54	54–42	

Legend: Blue = home team win; Yellow = draw; Red = away team win.

South Group

Home \ Away	EAS	EX	PLY	SOT
Eastbourne		34–62	60–34	57–39
Exeter	45–51		51–45	69–27
Plymouth	46–50	48–47		41–54
Southampton	57.5–38.5	61–34	60–36	

Legend: Blue = home team win; Yellow = draw; Red = away team win.

Final (5 Nov)

- Tamworth beat Eastbourne 55–41

== Riders and final averages ==
Cradley Heath

- Geoff Bennett 9.36
- Les Beaumont 8.40
- Eric Irons 7.44
- Jimmy Wright 7.04
- Bob Fletcher 6.90
- Alan Hunt 6.10
- Ray Beaumont 5.88
- Phil Malpass 5.03
- Frank Evans 4.34

Eastbourne

- Wally Green 10.20
- Basil Harris 9.46
- Jock Grierson 8.46
- Jimmy Coy 7.25
- Ken Tidbury 6.29
- Harry Saunders 5.71
- Ron Clarke 4.49
- Alan Briggs 3.71
- Bob Sivyer 3.20
- Eric Dunn 3.20
- Dennis Gray 3.00

Exeter

- Cyril Roger 10.31
- Don Hardy 7.86
- Stan Hodson 6.92
- Les Trim 6.62
- Allan Chambers 6.36
- Arthur Pilgrim 6.20
- Johnny Myson 6.18
- Sid Hazzard 6.08
- Bronco Slade 5.90
- Tom Crutcher 5.66
- Bill Williams 3.80

Hanley

- Dave Anderson 8.52
- Vic Pitcher 8.44
- Dick Howard 7.43
- Ray Harris 6.79
- Reg Gregory 6.15
- Les Jenkins 6.04
- Cyril Page 5.89
- Gil Blake 5.30
- George Fisher 5.23
- Bert Danner 3.89

Plymouth

- Ivan Kessell 7.81
- Stan Lanfear 7.55
- Alex Gray 6.84
- Charlie Challis 6.56
- Billy Newell 6.47
- Les Covell 5.71
- Len Read 5.10
- Doug Bell 4.26
- Jim Cashmore 4.20
- Bill Deegan 4.16
- Vic Gent 3.74
- Jack Milross 3.71
- Harold Sharpe 3.41
- Bill Sale 3.14

Southampton

- Peter Robinson 10.57
- Bob Oakley 9.37
- Jimmy Squibb 8.09
- George Bason 6.99
- Alf Kaines 6.47
- Pete Lansdale 6.22
- Bert Croucher 5.81
- Vic Collins 5.67
- Tony Buxey 3.73
- Matthew Hall 2.93
- Ron Lemon 2.80
- Bill Griffiths 2.40

Tamworth

- Steve Langton 8.00
- Arthur Payne 7.79
- Bill Harris 7.74
- Vic Pitcher 7.33
- Bill Dalton 6.67
- Ted Gibson 6.50
- Jack Baxter 6.64
- Cyril Page 6.27
- Charlie Oates 5.35
- Jack Ladd 5.18
- Fred Yates 4.89
- Jack Kidd 4.00
- Reg Challenger 2.29

Wombwell

- Harwood Pike 8.78
- Stan Hodson 8.15
- Len Tupling 7.88
- Bernard Tennant 7.11
- Bert Lacey 6.50
- Stan Beardsall 6.24
- Alf Elliott 6.12
- Red Hamley 6.03
- Bert Thomas 5.72
- Harry Modral 5.45
- Sam Marsland 5.38
- Ken Allick 5.33
- Jeff Bishop 4.79
- Gerry Williams 4.65
- Reg Challenger 4.00

== See also ==
- List of United Kingdom Speedway League Champions
- Knockout Cup (speedway)
