= 1970 Speedway World Pairs Championship =

3rd edition of the World motorcycle speedway Pairs Championship

1970 World Pairs Championship

Seasons
- ← 1969 1971 →

The 1970 Speedway World Pairs Championship was the first FIM Speedway World Pairs Championship. The final took place in Malmö, Sweden. The championship was won by New Zealand (28 points) who beat Sweden (25 points) and England (19 points).

== Semifinal 1 ==
- (England) Hyde Road, Manchester
- 6 May

Pos.	Team	Rider	Points
1st	New Zealand (27 pts)	Ivan Mauger	14
1st	New Zealand (27 pts)	Barry Briggs	13
2nd	Scotland (26 pts)	Bert Harkins	13
2nd	Scotland (26 pts)	Jim McMillan	13
3rd	England (23 pts)	Nigel Boocock	16
3rd	England (23 pts)	Eric Boocock	7
4	Australia (16 pts)	Jim Airey	11
4	Australia (16 pts)	Charlie Monk	5
5	Denmark (13 pts)	Ole Olsen	12
5	Denmark (13 pts)	Niels Weiss-Schelde	1
6	Norway (13 pts)	Reidar Eide	7
6	Norway (13 pts)	Øyvind S. Berg	6
7	West Germany (7 pts)	Rudolf Kastl	7
7	West Germany (7 pts)	Dieter Dauderer	0

== Semifinal 2 ==
- (Socialist Federal Republic of Yugoslavia) Kovinar Stadium, Maribor
- 17 May

Pos.	Team	Rider	Points
1st	Czechoslovakia (? pts)	Jiří Štancl	?
1st	Czechoslovakia (? pts)	Václav Verner	?
2nd	Poland (? pts)	Marian Spychała	?
2nd	Poland (? pts)	Paweł Mirowski	?
3rd	Yugoslavia (? pts)	Drago Perko	?
3rd	Yugoslavia (? pts)	Ivan Kos	?
4	Austria (? pts)	?	?
4	Austria (? pts)	?	?
5	Bulgaria (? pts)	?	?
5	Bulgaria (? pts)	?	?
6	East Germany (? pts)	?	?
6	East Germany (? pts)	?	?
7	Hungary (? pts)	?	?
7	Hungary (? pts)	?	?

== World final ==
- (Sweden) Malmö Stadion, Malmö
- 2 June

Placing	Pair / Rider Name	Total	1	2	3	4	5	6	7	8	9	10	11	12	13	14	15	16	17	18	19	20	21
1	New Zealand	28							10							20							28
1	(3) Ivan Mauger	12	2				2				2			3				3			E
1	(4) Ronnie Moore	16	3				3				3			2				2			3
2	Sweden	25							9							19							25
2	(11) Ove Fundin	15			3				3				3		3			E					3
2	(12) Bengt Jansson	10			1				2				2		2			1					2
3	England	19							5							10							19
3	(5) Nigel Boocock	6		1			0			1					0				3			1
3	(6) Eric Boocock	13		3			1			3					1				2			3
4	Scotland	18							5							11							18
4	(9) Jim McMillan	10			2			1				3		1			3					0
4	(10) Bert Harkins	8			0			2				2		0			2					2
5	Czechoslovakia	11							6							9							11
5	(1) Jiří Štancl	6	1			2				F			1				1			1
5	(2) Václav Verner	5	0			3				2			F				0			0
6	Yugoslavia	7							2							4							7
6	(13) Drasko Perko	6				1			0			1				1			1		2
6	(14) Ivan Kos	1+1				0			1			e				0			0		1
—^{a}	Denmark	17							5							11							17
—^{a}	(7) Ole Olsen	12		2				3			1					3				3			E
—^{a}	(8) Bent Nørregaard-Jensen	5		0				0			0					2				2			1
Placing	Pair / Rider Name	Total	1	2	3	4	5	6	7	8	9	10	11	12	13	14	15	16	17	18	19	20	21

m - exclusion for exceeding two minute time allowance • t - exclusion for touching the tapes • x - other exclusion • e - retired or mechanical failure • f - fell
ns - non-starter • nc - non-classify

gate A - inside	gate B	gate C	gate D - outside

Notes:

a. The Danish team weren't classified, because they were track reserve team who replaced Poland.

== See also ==
- 1970 Individual Speedway World Championship
- 1970 Speedway World Team Cup
- motorcycle speedway
- 1970 in sports
