= Will Lowther =

British motorcycle speedway rider

- Born: 11 February 1913; Low Fell, Gateshead
- Died: 10 October 1982 (aged 69)
- Nationality: British (English)

Career history
- 1936: Bristol Bulldogs
- 1937–1938: Harringay Tigers
- 1938: Lea Bridge Cubs
- 1939: Middlesbrough Bears
- 1939: Norwich Stars
- 1946–1949: Glasgow Lions/Tigers
- 1949–1950: Newcastle Magpies/Diamonds
- 1951–1952: Motherwell Eagles

William Atkinson Lowther (11 February 1913 – 10 October 1982) was a motorcycle speedway rider from England.

== Biography ==
Lowther, born in Low Fell, Gateshead, began racing speedway bikes on the grasstrack circuits in Newcastle. In 1936, after a trial with Southampton Saints he was offered a deal but chose to join Bristol Bulldogs, where he rode in the 1936 Provincial Speedway League season. He then signed on with New Cross Tamers.

However, the following season in 1937, Lowther started racing at Leicester and then Middlesbrough and Rye House respectively before competing in the league for Harringay Tigers. Lowther struggled at Harringay in the reserve berth, which led to him completing the 1983 season on loan with the Lea Bridge Cubs in division 2.

Lowther returned to Middlesbrough Bears in 1939 and enjoyed a good season up to the point when Middlesbrough withdrew from the league, recording an average of 8.25. He then found a home at Glasgow, known as the Lions at the time but the season ended early due to World War II.

It was not until after the war that Lowther's career took off, when league speedway finally returned to Glasgow for the 1946 Speedway Northern League season. He became a fans' favourite at Glasgow Tigers and would ride for them for the next four years becoming their number 1 rider and captain and recording averages of 9.67 and 9.28 respectively.

In late 1949, after ten years with the club, Lowther shocked Glasgow by handing in a transfer request citing the fact that he had not been chosen to ride for the Scotland national speedway team (riders based in Scotland were eligible for the team). He rode for Newcastle until returning to Scotland to ride for the Motherwell Eagles from 1951 to 1952, where he ended his career.
