= Motherwell Eagles =

British speedway team

Motherwell Eagles Lanarkshire Eagles

Club information
- Track address: The Stadium; Milton Street; Motherwell
- Country: Scotland
- Founded: 1951
- Closed: 1954

Club facts
- Colours: Black and Gold
- Track size: 430 yards (390 m)

Major team honours
Winners Northern Shield	1954

The Motherwell Eagles or Lanarkshire Eagles were a motorcycle speedway team based in Motherwell, Scotland, that participated in the British National League Division Two from 1951 and 1954.

== History ==
In March 1950 the Speedway Control Board granted a licence for the Motherwell Stadium, in Milton Street, Motherwell, which was used primarily for greyhound racing at the time. The licence had initially been refused but the stadium was designed with speedway in mind; the bends wide enough for six cars side by side. The supporters club numbered 6,000.

The first meeting was held on 14 July 1950 in a challenge match against Newcastle Diamonds before the Eagles joined the league in 1951. The Eagles started out in the British National League Division Two with veteran ex-Glasgow Tigers Will Lowther and Joe Crowther and ex-Edinburgh rider Danny Lee in the line up. Bill Baird, a pioneer Eagle, became the only rider to ride for all four Scottish teams starting as a Glasgow Tiger before moves to Edinburgh then Ashfield. The team was strengthened late in 1951 by the transfer of Derick Close from Newcastle. In 1952, Eagles rider Derek Close reached the final of the Speedway World Championship. The Eagles operated until the end of the 1954 season and would have run in 1955 but for the reluctance of teams in England to travel up to Scotland.

The top man was Derick Close, signed from the Newcastle Diamonds in 1951, and he was supported by Gordon McGregor, an ex- Glasgow Tiger, who was a founder Eagle in 1951. The team also featured Australians Keith Gurtner and Ron Phillips who transferred over when the Ashfield Giants left the League. Due to his never say die approach, the fans favourite was Bluey Scott, who joined the Eagles in 1951. Popular Australian Noel Watson, one of the earliest Eagles signings in 1950 along with Clive Gressor, was killed in his home country in 1953. Tommy Miller, one of the top Scottish speedway stars of the day, joined the Eagles in 1954 but moved on to the Coventry Bees mid-season.

Motherwell speedway closed down after the 1954 season due to financial losses of £500 for the season.

Speedway returned for a short spell in 1958 in a series of challenge matches, when Ian Hoskins established the Golden Eagles who featured Doug Templeton and Willie Templeton, Gordon Mitchell, Jimmy Tannock, Freddie Greenwell and gave a shale debut to George Hunter.

The site was redeveloped and was used briefly in 1971/72 for three long track events and a speedway meeting on a smaller circuit built on the centre green.

== Season summary ==
Year and league	Position	Notes
1951 Speedway National League Division Two	7th	
1952 Speedway National League Division Two	8th	
1953 Speedway National League Division Two	6th	
1954 Speedway National League Division Two	10th	rode as Lanarkshire Eagles

== Notable riders ==
- (England) Derick Close
- (England) Joe Crowther
- (Scotland) George Hunter
- (England) Will Lowther
- (Scotland) Gordon McGregor
- (Scotland) Tommy Miller
- (Australia) Bluey Scott
