= Willie Templeton =

British speedway rider

- Born: 12 September 1930; Maybole, South Ayrshire, Scottish
- Died: 15 August 2008 (aged 77); Kirkcaldy, Fife, Scotland
- Nationality: British (Scottish)

Career history
- 1958: Lanarkshire Eagles
- 1960–1964: Edinburgh Monarchs
- 1965–1971: Glasgow Tigers
- 1972–1978: Berwick Bandits

William Muir Templeton (12 September 1930 – 15 August 2008) was a motorcycle speedway rider from Scotland.

== Career ==
Templeton and his brother Doug first raced during the 1958 season in a series of challenge matches for Lanarkshire Eagles based in Motherwell. The pair raced grass track during 1959, before joining Edinburgh Monarchs for the new 1960 Provincial Speedway League.

They spent five seasons with Edinburgh from 1960 to 1965 before Willie finally separated from his brother by joining Glasgow Tigers during the 1965 British League season. He would ride of the club for seven seasons from 1965 until 1971 and during that time would ride in the same team as his two nephews Jim McMillan and Bill McMillan. For the 1970 British League season, his brother Doug also joined the club from Edinburgh Monarchs. All four family members were part of the team during the same season in 1970 and 1971.

In 1972, along with his brother Doug, Templeton joined Scottish rivals Berwick Bandits in the second division. He continued to ride for Berwick until his last season in 1978. He earned one international Scottish cap.
