= Joe Crowther =

English motorcycle speedway rider (1913–1991)

- Born: 27 April 1913; Stanley, County Durham, England
- Died: 22 February 1991 (aged 77)
- Nationality: British (English)

Career history
- 1939, 1946–1950: Glasgow Tigers
- 1951–1953: Motherwell Eagles

Joseph Cameron Crowther (27 April 1913 – 22 February 1991) was an English motorcycle speedway rider who had his greatest success in the period immediately after World War II.

== Career ==
Crowther was born in Stanley, County Durham on 27 April 1913. After early ambitions of becoming a jockey, he initially pursued a career as a footballer with Crook Town. His jobs before taking up speedway included a comedian in a travelling opera company and working for his father's butchery business. After first seeing speedway at Middlesbrough in 1937, where he was inspired by Frank Hodgson, he rode in grasstrack and junior speedway events at Newcastle, going on to ride for West Ham, Newcastle and Glasgow before the outbreak of war in 1939.

Crowther returned to Glasgow after the war, progressing to become the team's second highest points scorer in the 1947 season. He continued his good form in 1948, scoring 440 points. He stayed with Glasgow until 1951, at which point he was the team captain, when he requested a transfer to Motherwell Eagles, going on to ride for Motherwell for a few seasons before retiring. After retiring from racing he became team manager of the Leicester Hunters, also looking after the track at Leicester Stadium.

Crowther died on 22 February 1991, at the age of 77.
