= Doug Templeton =

Scottish motorcycle speedway rider

- Born: 18 June 1928; Maybole, South Ayrshire, Scotland
- Died: 21 December 2019 (aged 91); Scotland
- Nationality: British (Scottish)

Career history
- 1953: Glasgow White City Tigers
- 1954, 1958: Lanarkshire Eagles
- 1955: Belle Vue Aces
- 1956: Ipswich Witches
- 1960–1967: Edinburgh Monarchs
- 1968–1969, 1975–1976: Coatbridge Monarchs
- 1970–1971: Glasgow Tigers
- 1972–1974: Berwick Bandits

Douglas Templeton (18 June 1928 – 21 December 2019) was a motorcycle speedway rider from Scotland.

== Career ==
Templeton began racing for Glasgow White City Tigers during the 1953 Speedway National League Division Two season. The following year he joined the Lanarkshire Eagles (based in Motherwell) but the team disbanded after the 1954 season.

Templeton rode a couple of matches for Ipswich Witches in 1956 before missing the 1957 season. Doug and his brother Willie Templeton then raced during the 1958 season in a series of challenge matches for Lanarkshire Eagles. The pair raced grass track during 1959, before joining Edinburgh Monarchs for the new 1960 Provincial Speedway League.

The pair spent five seasons together with Edinburgh from 1960 to 1965 before Willie finally separated from his brother by joining Glasgow Tigers during the 1965 British League season. Doug continued to ride for Edinburgh and won the Scottish Open Championship in 1960 and 1962. He stayed loyal with the club through the turmoil of the Coatbridge years.

In 1970, as a Glasgow rider, Templeton teamed up with his brother and two nephews Jim McMillan and Bill McMillan. For the 1970 British League season, all four family members were part of the team during the same season in 1970 and 1971. In 1972, along with his brother Willie, he joined Scottish rivals Berwick Bandits in the second division. He continued to ride for Berwick until 1974 before appearing for Coatbridge in his 23rd and 24th seasons of 1975 and 1976.

Templeton earned international Scottish and British caps.
