= Dennis Gray (speedway rider) =

British motorcycle speedway rider

- Born: 19 June 1929; Colliers Wood, London, England
- Died: 27 January 2021 (aged 91); Swanage, Dorset
- Nationality: British (English)

Career history
- 1946–1953: Wimbledon Dons
- 1947: Eastbourne Eagles
- 1949: Oxford Cheetahs
- 1954: Leicester Hunters
- 1955: Rayleigh Rockets

Team honours
- 1947: league champion (tier 3)
- 1950, 1951: National Trophy

Dennis Howard Gray (19 June 1929 – 27 January 2021) was an international motorcycle speedway rider from England. He earned one international cap for the England national speedway team.

== Biography ==
Gray, born in Colliers Wood, London, began his British leagues career riding for Wimbledon Dons during the 1946 Speedway National League. He was aged just 17 when he made his debut and was the youngest rider in the league.

A protégé of Norman Parker, Gray was loaned to Eastbourne Eagles at the start of the 1947 season and made an immediate impact becoming their captain. He suffered a serious hand injury which curtailed his season but he did contribute to their league success during the 1947 Speedway National League Division Three season.

In 1948, Gray returned to Wimbledon but joined the Royal Air Force, which resulted in him missing the majority of the season. When he returned to speedway he was once again loaned out by Wimbledon but this time to Oxford Cheetahs, where he impressed topping the Oxford averages at 8.20 and was the highlight of a poor Oxford season. He finally earned a run in the Wimbledon team and was a regular from 1950 and effectively won the National Trophy for the team, after top scoring in both legs of the final. He starred again in the 1951 National Trophy final, was capped by England and remained a regular for Wimbledon. He suffered a serious crash in 1952, fracturing his skull and then broke his collarbone on his return. His form was never the same, having a poor season in 1953 before he was signed by Leicester Hunters for the 1954 season.

The serious injuries that Gray had suffered took their toll and his final season was in 1955 with the Rayleigh Rockets.
