= Terry Small =

British motorcycle speedway rider (1927 – 1983)

- Born: 6 January 1927; Southampton, England
- Died: 10 December 1983 (aged 56); Southampton, England
- Nationality: British (English)

Career history
- 1949–1956, 1958–1959: Poole Pirates
- 1957: Rayleigh Rockets

Team honours
- 1952, 1955: league champion (tier 2)
- 1952, 1955: National Trophy (tier 2)
- 1951: league champion (tier 3)

Terence Frank Small (6 January 1927 – 10 December 1983) was an international motorcycle speedway rider from England. He earned one international cap for the England national speedway team.

== Biography ==
Small, born in Southampton, raced grasstrack in Egypt, while serving with the British Army. He began his British leagues career riding for Poole Pirates during the 1949 Speedway National League Division Three season. He quickly became a regular in the team and made significant progress over the following two seasons, averaging an impressive 9.60 during the 1951 season. The 1951 season ended with honours as Poole won the league title.

Poole moved up a division in 1952 and Small was an integral part of the team when they won the league and cup double with relative ease. He became a fans favourite and was still with the club when they won another league and cup double during the 1955 season.

Small rode once for Rayleigh Rockets in 1957 before deciding to take a break form speedway. He returned to Poole for two more seasons from 1958 to 1959. When he retired, he had ridden 296 times for Poole and scored 2165 points. He was inducted into the Poole Hall of Fame in 1994.
