= Bill Holden (speedway rider) =

British speedway rider

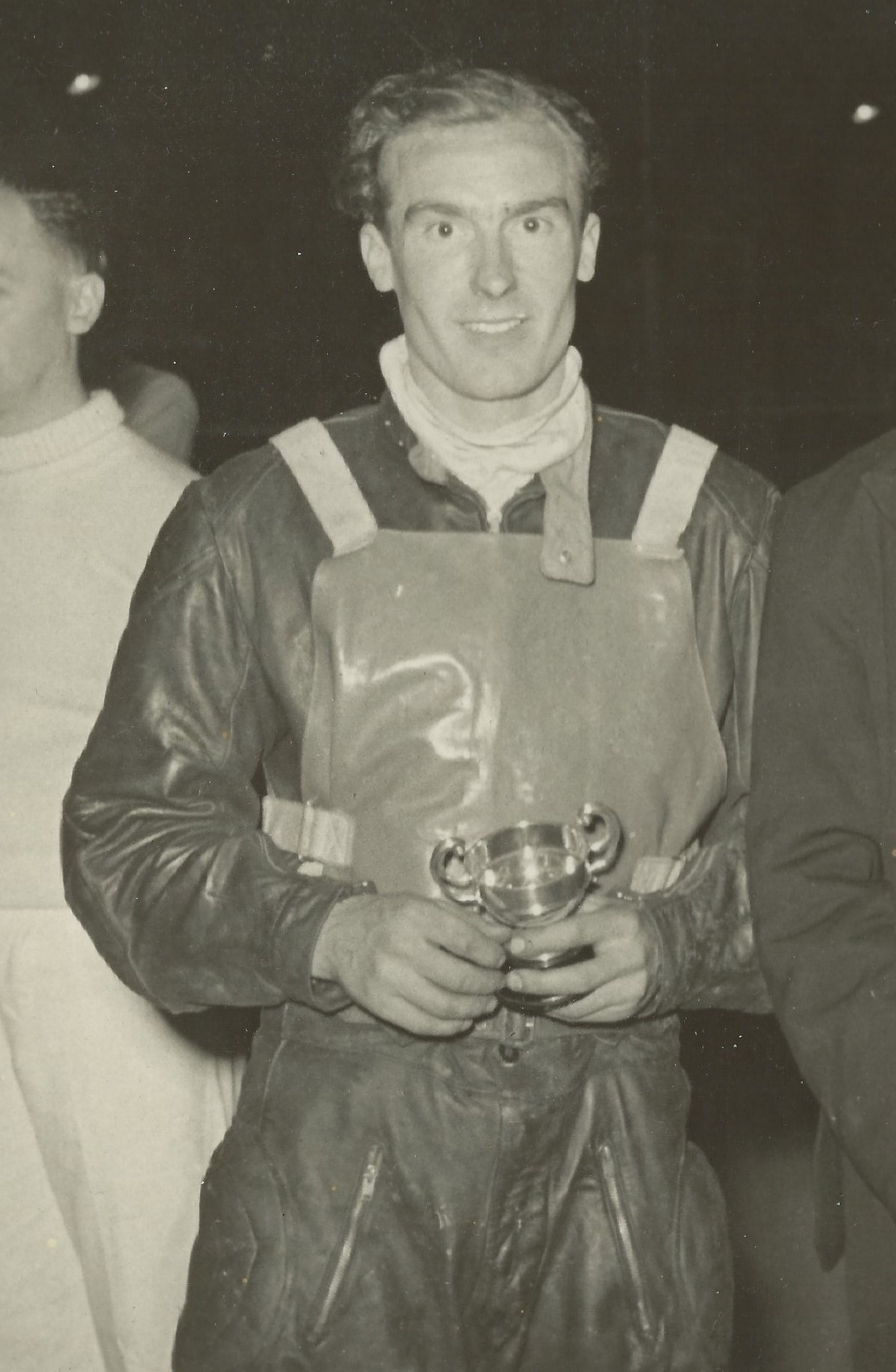
- Born: 8 March 1923; Blackburn, England
- Died: 14 March 2011 (aged 88)
- Nationality: British (English)

Career history
- 1950–1951, 1956–1957: Southampton Saints
- 1951–56, 1958: Poole Pirates

Team honours
- 1951: Division 3 champions
- 1952, 1955: Division 2 champions
- 1952, 1955, 1956: National Trophy (Div 2)

William Holden (8 March 1923 – 14 March 2011) was a motorcycle speedway rider from England.

== Career ==
Holden rode for Southampton Saints (1950-1951 and 1957), Poole Pirates 1951–1956 and 1958) and England (1952). He won the Division 3 championship with Poole in 1951 and the following year won the Division 2 title with Poole. In 1955, he won a third title when Poole won Division 2 again.

On 14 August 1951, Holden set a new track record at the Cornish Stadium, recording 67 seconds.

Holden is still regarded by some as one of the best riders ever to don the distinctive blue and white skull and crossbones race jacket of Poole. Holden was entered into the Poole Speedway Hall of Fame in 2008 having scored 1,599 points in 639 races.

== Personal life ==
Holden is uncle to former Exeter Falcons, Poole and England rider Kevin Holden and father to former Weymouth junior Paul Holden.
