= Bluey Scott =

Australian motorcycle speedway rider

- Born: 10 July 1929; Auburn, New South Wales
- Died: 27 February 2023 (aged 90); Burleigh Heads, Queensland
- Nationality: Australian

Career history
- 1951–1954: Motherwell/Lanarkshire Eagles
- 1955: Ipswich Witches
- 1955: Southampton Saints
- 1963–1964: Long Eaton Archers
- 1964: Middlesbrough Bears
- 1965–1966: Glasgow Tigers

Individual honours
- 1968: Queensland State Champion

Eric William Scott better known as Bluey Scott or Jack Scott (born 10 July 1929 – 27 February 2023) was a motorcycle speedway rider from Australia.

== Biography ==
Scott, born in Auburn, New South Wales, started racing in 1949. He began his British leagues career riding for Motherwell Eagles during the 1951 Speedway National League Division Two season. He joined Motherwell through his connection with his friend Jack Young.

Scott spent four seasons at Motherwell, although during the last season, the team were known as the Lanarkshire Eagles. He returned home to Australia for the winter of 1954 before learning that Motherwell were closing due to financial losses.

Subsequently, Scott was subject to interest from Coventry Bees but secured a transfer to Southampton Saints for the 1955 season and then finished the season with Ipswich Witches.

Scott returned to race in Australia and remained there until 1963, when he was signed by Reg Fearman for the Long Eaton Archers. He averaged 7.16 for Long Eaton before switching to Middlesbrough Bears in 1964.

Scott sealed an exchange transfer to Glasgow Tigers in 1965 for the inaugural British League season, trading places with Ray Cresp. His final season was with Glasgow in 1966.
