= Snälltorpet =

Former stadium in Eskilstuna, Sweden

- Location: Eskilstuna, Sweden
- Coordinates: 59°22′09″N 16°29′27″E
- Operator: Motorcycle speedway

Snälltorpet or the old Eskilstuna Motorstadion was a motorcycle speedway stadium located in Eskilstuna, Sweden. It was located close to the Tunavallen on the south side and is today housing surrounding the Granbarrsgatan road.

The stadium was the home arena of the team Smederna from 1952 to 2001. Smederna competed in the Swedish Speedway Team Championship. In 2001, the land was sold by Eskilstuna Municipality for housing and the team moved to the Smedstadion.

The venue hosted significant speedway events and was used for the final of the 1976 Speedway World Pairs Championship. It also hosted the Intercontinental final of the 1979 Speedway World Team Cup and five Swedish Championships in 1974, 1978, 1980, 1982 and 1989.
