= Junior Bainbridge =

Australian motorcycle speedway rider (1924 – 2000)

- Born: 26 April 1924; Melbourne, Australia
- Died: 5 November 2000 (aged 76); Melbourne, Australia
- Nationality: Australian

Career history
- 1947–1953: Glasgow Tigers
- 1954–1957: Ipswich Witches

Team honours
- 1952, 1953: Scottish Cup

Ronald Arthur Bainbridge (26 April 1924 – 5 November 2000) was an Australian motorcycle speedway rider. During his speedway career, he rode as Junior Bainbridge and earned nine international caps for the Australia national speedway team.

== Biography ==
Bainbridge, born in Melbourne, was spotted riding by Charlie Spinks in 1946. before beginning his British leagues career riding for Glasgow during the 1947 Speedway National League Division Two season. After two moderate seasons, his average improved significantly during 1949, when he hit 8.17 and then increased this to 8.68 in 1950. He became a crowd favourite and expectations were high when he rode for them.

Bainbridge reached the Championship round of the 1950 Individual Speedway World Championship and the 1951 Individual Speedway World Championship and averaged an impressive 9.18 in 1952 for Glasgow.

Bainbridge's final season at Glasgow was in the 1953 Speedway National League Division Two, because the following year he signed for Ipswich Witches at a cost of £500, to help clear the debts of the Scottish club.

Bainbridge would spend four years with the Suffolk club, recording 9.32 and topping the team's averages during his first season with them.

Bainbridge retired from British speedway after the 1957 season but returned to Australia and continued to ride for a few years, riding for Australia against England as late as January 1960.
