= Dick Campbell (speedway rider) =

New Zealand motorcycle speedway rider

- Born: 5 June 1923; Christchurch, New Zealand
- Died: November 1990 (aged 67)
- Nationality: New Zealander

Career history
- 1947: Belle Vue Aces
- 1947: Sheffield Tigers
- 1948–1954, 1961–1962: Edinburgh Monarchs
- 1954: Ipswich Witches

Team honours
- 1951: Northern Shield
- 1951: Scottish Cup

Richard Challiner Campbell (5 June 1923 – November 1990) was a New Zealand international motorcycle speedway rider. He earned six international caps for the New Zealand national speedway team.

== Biography ==
Campbell, born in Christchurch, New Zealand was a stunt rider on the 'wall of death' at fairgrounds and raced cars in South Africa before he travelled to Britain to begin his British leagues career riding for Belle Vue Aces during the 1947 Speedway National League season. He initially struggled and finished the season with the Sheffield Tigers in division 2.

In 1948, Campbell signed for Edinburgh Monarchs and would spend nine seasons with the club, spanning the years 1948 to 1962 and becoming one of Edinburgh's most legendary riders. He averaged 9.87 in 1954.

Campbell regularly reached the Championship round of the Speedway World Championship during the 1950s, and his only season away from Edinburgh was when they withdrew from the league in 1954, forcing him to see out the season at Ipswich Witches.

Campbell decided to race cars again in New Zealand from 1955 to 1960 but returned to Britain for two more seasons at Edinburgh from 1961 to 1962, topping the team's averages in 1961.
