= Don Cuppleditch =

British motorcycle speedway rider

- Born: 25 October 1923; Leeds, England
- Died: 20 December 2018 (aged 95); Australia
- Nationality: British (English)

Career history
- 1948–1954: Edinburgh Monarchs
- 1954–1955: Belle Vue Aces

Team honours
- 1951: Northern Shield
- 1951: Scottish Cup

Donald Dearnley Cuppleditch (25 October 1923 – 20 December 2018) was a motorcycle speedway rider from England.

== Biography ==
Cuppleditch, born in Leeds, was first noticed riding a form of speedway in early 1947, when attached to the Royal Lincolnshire Regiment and taking part in makeshift events overseas. He began his British leagues career riding for Edinburgh Monarchs during the 1948 Speedway National League Division Two season.

The following season, Cuppleditch improved as a rider and became an important part of the Scottish club's plans. He would ride for Edinburgh for seven years from 1948 to 1954 and recorded some impressive season averages including 9.54 in 1952 and 10.36 in 1953, the latter being the second best average in the entire division. In-between, he reached the Championship round of the 1952 Individual Speedway World Championship and 1953 Individual Speedway World Championship and won the International round meeting at Old Meadowbank on 18 July 1953.

Mid-way through the 1954 season, Cuppleditch's form attracted interest from the division one teams and West Ham Hammers failed in a bid to sign him before Belle Vue Aces were successful. Edinburgh withdrew from the league shortly afterwards due to the loss of their two best riders. He remained at Belle Vue until the end of the 1955 season.

After speedway, Cuppleditch would later emigrate to Australia.
