= Gordon McGregor (speedway rider) =

British speedway rider

- Born: 28 November 1921; Linlithgow, West Lothian, Scotland
- Died: 29 September 2001 (aged 79)
- Nationality: British (Scottish)

Career history
- 1947–1950, 1967: Glasgow Tigers
- 1951–1954: Motherwell/Lanarkshire Eagles
- 1955–1956: Leicester Hunters
- 1957–1962: Oxford Cheetahs
- 1963–1966: Belle Vue Aces
- 1967: Long Eaton Archers
- 1969: King's Lynn Starlets
- 1970: Doncaster Dragons
- 1971: Birmingham Brummies

Team honours
- 1963: National League

James Ramsay Gordon McGregor (28 November 1921 – 29 September 2001) was a motorcycle speedway rider from Scotland.

== Career ==
McGregor started racing in the British leagues during the 1947 Speedway National League Division Two season, when riding for the Glasgow Tigers but struggled to achieve a decent average during the first two seasons with the club.

During the 1949 season, McGregor improved significantly, almost doubling his average and in 1950 he helped his team finish runner-up in the league table. Despite a last successful season with the Tigers he switched to the Motherwell Eagles for the 1952 season. He would spend the next four years in Motherwell (becoming captain) before asking for a transfer in 1954. He moved south to join the Leicester Hunters for the 1955 Speedway National League Division Two season. During this period, he was consistently averaging over 8 and was a heat leader for his team.

In 1957, McGregor rode for the first time in the highest league of British Speedway with the Oxford Cheetahs. The step up made little difference as he continued to impress as a heat leader and averaged 8.31 in 1959. After six years with Oxford, he still had no silverware to his name but this changed when he joined the Belle Vue Aces in 1963. In his first season with the Manchester club he was a league champion. He remained with Belle Vue on the formation of the new British League in 1965.

During this period, McGregor was winning international caps and won 19 England national speedway team caps; Scottish riders competed for England at the time.

After the 1967 season, McGregor only made a handful of appearances over the next five years from 1967 to 1971, with the exception of a full season with Doncaster Dragons in 1970.
