= Ray New =

New Zealand speedway rider (1926–2001)

- Born: 14 November 1926; Auckland, New Zealand
- Died: 27 May 2001 (aged 74)
- Nationality: New Zealander

Career history

Great Britain
- 1950: Sheffield Tars
- 1951–1957: Coventry Bees
- 1958: Oxford Cheetahs

Individual honours
- 1960, 1961: New Zealand champion

Team honours
- 1953: National League Div 2 Champion
- 1952: Midland Cup
- 1954: Northern Shield

Raymond Charles New (14 November 1926 – 27 May 2001) was a New Zealand motorcycle speedway rider and promoter. During his United Kingdom career, he was known as Charlie New. He earned two caps for the New Zealand national speedway team.

== Career ==
New started racing in the British leagues during the 1950 Speedway National League Division Two season, when riding for the Sheffield Tars. He joined Coventry Bees in 1951 and stayed with them for seven years.

In 1960 and 1961, New became two times champion of New Zealand after winning the New Zealand Solo Championship.
