= Len Williams (speedway rider) =

- Born: 15 December 1920; Leicester, England
- Died: 15 June 2007 (aged 86); Sheffield, England
- Nationality: British (English)

Career history
- 1947–1951, 1960–1961: Sheffield Tigers/Tars
- 1951–1956: Leicester Hunters

Individual honours
- 1952: Midland Riders' Champion

Team honours
- 1947: British Speedway Cup (Div 2)
- 1951: Midland Cup

Leonard Frank Williams (15 December 1920 – 15 June 2007) was a British motorcycle speedway rider for Sheffield and Leicester.

== Career ==
Born in Leicester in December 1920, Williams served in the Royal Air Force before beginning his speedway career, joining at the outbreak of war aged seventeen as a mechanic, and being demobilized in 1945, by which time had risen to the rank of flying officer.

Williams' older brother Stan was captain of Sheffield Tigers, and tutored Len in the sport in 1947 while injured. By 1948, he had become a regular member of the Sheffield team, becoming a heat leader in 1949. He moved on to ride for Leicester Hunters (still his local team as he lived in Narborough), for a transfer fee of £1,000,

Williams narrowly missed out on qualifying for the 1951 Individual Speedway World Championship. In 1952, he was selected (along with his brother) for the England team to face Scotland, and also rode for Britain against an 'overseas' team. Williams won the inaugural Midland Riders' Championship in 1952.

Williams continued riding for the Hunters for six seasons between 1951 and 1956 and taking over from Cyril Page as captain, before retiring. In 1956, he was denied a second Midland Riders' Championship after narrowly losing out to teammate Ken McKinlay.

Williams came out of retirement to return to the Sheffield team in 1960, also riding in 1961, but only in home matches.

Williams died in June 2007 at the age of 86.
