= Peter Robinson (speedway rider) =

British motorcycle speedway rider (1919 – 1991)

- Born: 29 January 1919; High Wycombe, Buckinghamshire, England
- Died: 17 January 1991 (aged 71)
- Nationality: British (English)

Career history
- 1946: Wimbledon Dons
- 1947: Southampton Saints
- 1948–1950: Plymouth Devils
- 1951–1953: Liverpool Chads
- 1953–1956: Oxford Cheetahs

Arthur Peter Leslie Robinson (29 January 1919 – 17 January 1991) was a motorcycle speedway rider from England.

== Biography ==
Robinson, born in High Wycombe, joined Wimbledon Dons in 1946 but failed to break into the first team. The following season, he rode for Southampton Saints during the 1947 Speedway National League Division Three and made a significant impact by not only being Southampton's best rider but actually recording the best average in the entire division, hitting an impressive 10.57.

Robinson's form attracted interest from the big clubs and Robinson was allocated to the Wembley Lions for the 1948 season, before he switched to Plymouth Devils for three seasons from 1948 and 1950.

In 1951, Robinson joined Liverpool Chads and was their top rider for three seasons, averaging 8.80, 9.13 and 8.69 respectively. He also reached the Championship round of the 1951 Individual Speedway World Championship and the 1952 Individual Speedway World Championship.

When Liverpool folded in mid-season during 1952, Robinson found a new home at Oxford Cheetahs, where he finished his career after the 1956 season.
