= Tommy Miller (speedway rider) =

Scottish motorcycle speedway rider (1924–1975)

- Born: 22 February 1924; Blantyre, South Lanarkshire, Scotland
- Died: 12 June 1975 (aged 51); East Kilbride, Scotland
- Nationality: British (Scottish)

Career history
- 1950–1953: Glasgow White City Tigers
- 1954: Lanarkshire Eagles
- 1954–1956: Coventry Bees
- 1956: Oxford Cheetahs

Team honours
- 1952, 1953: Scottish Cup
- 1954: Northern Shield

Thomas Ogilvie Miller (2 February 1924 – 12 June 1975) was a motorcycle speedway rider from Scotland.

== Career ==
Miller was first noticed during the Scottish Winter training school and then won the best pairs championship at Bothwell Park during March 1950. He began racing for Glasgow White City Tigers during the 1950 Speedway National League Division Two season. He made an immediate impact by topping the team's averages and helping the team to a second-place finish in the league. The following season in 1951, he established himself as one of the league's leading riders with an impressive 10.70 average.

In 1953, Miller continued to impress and recorded a sequence of 17 league matches without being beaten by an opponent in any race and in 16 home matches that season only dropped three points. He also impressed during the qualification for the 1953 Individual Speedway World Championship. In 1954, Glasgow did not enter the league which forced Miller to look for a new team, he signed for Lanarkshire Eagles for £1,500, the highest sum paid for a rider by a Scottish club at the time, and despite better offers from English clubs. His time with the Motherwell club was not a happy one and he asked for a transfer in July 1954. After turning down a bid from Belle Vue Aces, he joined the defending league two champions Coventry Bees and would top the team averages by the end of the season.

After spending the 1955 season and the first half of the 1956 season with Coventry, Miller switched to Oxford Cheetahs for the remainder of 1956.

Miller earned 18 caps for the Scotland national speedway team (including Scottish select matches).

After speedway, Miller sold motor bikes and then cars but died aged 51.
