= Derick Close =

British speedway rider (1927–2021)

- Born: 13 May 1927; Bowes, County Durham, England
- Died: 4 October 2021 (aged 94)
- Nationality: British (English)

Career history
- 1947–1948: Middlesbrough Bears
- 1948, 1949–1951: Newcastle Diamonds
- 1951–1954: Motherwell/Lanarkshire Eagles
- 1955: Leicester Hunters

Derick Tallentire Close (13 May 1927 – 4 October 2021) was a British motorcycle speedway rider, who reached the final of Speedway World Championship in 1952.

== Career ==
Close was born in Bowes, County Durham. He started his career with the Middlesbrough Bears in 1947 followed by a short spell on loan with the Newcastle Diamonds at the start of 1948. He returned to the Bears and established himself in the team. In 1949, he rejoined Newcastle where he spent the next three seasons before joining the Lanarkshire Eagles mid season in 1951.

The 1952 season proved to be the best of Close's career after receiving a call up to ride for England, despite riding in National League Division Two, having never ridden in the top flight. He also reached the final of the Speedway World Championship. In 1953, he suffered a fractured skull and although he rode well again in 1954 he suffered a drop in form after joining the Leicester Hunters in 1955 and retired at the end of the season.

At retirement, Close had earned two international caps for the England national speedway team.

== World final appearances ==
- 1952 – (England) London, Wembley Stadium – 14th – 4pts
