= 1981 Individual Speedway World Championship =

Motorcycle speedway world championship season

Seasons
- ← 1980 1982 →

The 1981 Individual Speedway World Championship was the 36th edition of the official Motorcycle speedway World Championship to determine the world champion rider.

It was also the last of a record 26 times that London's world famous Wembley Stadium hosted the World Final. It also marked the final time that the stadium would be used for any speedway. In future years when the final was held in England, it would be held at the Odsal Stadium in Bradford until the advent of the Speedway Grand Prix series in 1995. The 1981 Final was held before a reported crowd of 92,500, just shy of the Wembley record of 95,000 set at the 1938 World Final.

Bruce Penhall became the first American to win the World Championship since Jack Milne in 1937. As a past World Championship winner at Wembley, the 74-year-old Milne was a special guest at the event and saw Penhall end America's 44 year Individual World Championship drought. Though he remained undefeated until his last ride when he only needed to finish 3rd to win the Championship (he finished that race in second behind his rival Kenny Carter), Penhall was forced to work hard for his maiden World Championship. In both Heat 7 and Heat 14 he was second for over 3½ laps behind Ole Olsen and Tommy Knudsen respectively before passing both in the run to the line. Olsen would defeat Knudsen in a runoff for second and third places after both finished on 12 points. The triple World Champion gaining some revenge on his younger countryman after Knudsen had defeated Olsen in the first heat of the meeting.

In Heat 6, Erik Gundersen set a new four lap record of 66.8 seconds for the track and as this was the final speedway meeting at Wembley it will forever be the track record.

== First round ==
=== New Zealand qualification ===
Event	Date	Venue	Winner	2nd	3rd
South Island Final	19 Jan	Ruapuna Speedway, Christchurch	Larry Ross	Tony Briggs	Ivan Mauger
North Island Final	?	Awapuni Speedway, Gisborne	Wayne Brown	Colin Farquharson	Martin Weygang

=== Australian qualification ===
Event	Date	Venue	Winner	2nd	3rd
Southern Zone Final	16 Jan	Speedway Park, Adelaide	Phil Crump	John Boulger	Mick McKeon
Northern Zone Final	12 Feb	Exhibition Ground, Brisbane	Gary Guglielmi	Neil Coddington	Billy Sanders

=== British qualification ===
Date	Venue	Winner	2nd	3rd
Preliminary Round
7 April	Wessex Stadium, Weymouth	Neil Middleditch	Simon Wigg	Kevin Smith
10 April	East of England Arena, Peterborough	Louis Carr	Kevin Hawkins	Nicky Allott
12 April	Rye House Stadium, Hoddesdon	Keith White	Melvyn Taylor	Bob Garrad
12 April	Boston Sports Stadium, Boston	Steve Lomas	David Gagen	Eric Broadbelt
14 April	Crayford & Bexleyheath Stadium, Crayford	Barry Thomas	Ian Gledhill	Dave Morton
Quarter-Final
27 April	Brough Park, Newcastle	Eric Broadbelt	Kevin Hawkins	Neil Middleditch

== Second round ==
=== Continental preliminary round ===
- Riders progress to Continental quarter-finals

Date	Venue	Winner	2nd	3rd
25 April	(Socialist Federal Republic of Yugoslavia) Petišovci Stadium, Lendava	(Austria) Herbert Szerecz	(West Germany) Alois Wiesböck	(Poland) Mariusz Okoniewski
26 April	(West Germany) Breitenthal Stadium, Krumbach	(Hungary) Ferenc Farkaš	(Czechoslovakia) Jan Verner	(Netherlands) Henny Kroeze
26 April	(Bulgaria) Shumen Motopista, Shumen	(Poland) Henryk Olszak	(Czechoslovakia) Ladislav Hradecky	(Poland) Andrzej Huszcza
26 April	(Czechoslovakia) Speedway Žarnovica, Žarnovica	(West Germany) Waldemar Bacik	(West Germany) Andreas Niedemaier	(West Germany) Kurt Prastbo

=== Australian Final ===
- 21 February 1981
- (Australia) Exhibition Ground, Brisbane
- First 8 to Australasian Final

Pos.	Rider	Total
1	Billy Sanders	14
2	Phil Crump	12
3	John Titman	10
4	Danny Kennedy	10
5	Phil Herne	9
6	Gary Guglielmi	8
7	Steve Regeling	8
8	Mick McKeon	8
9	John Boulger	7
10	Robert Maxfield	7
11	Steve Koppe	7
12	Neil Coddington	7
13	Tim Nunan	6
14	Bob Chitchcock	3
15	Glenn McDonald	2
16	Lou Sansom	2

=== New Zealand Final ===
- 6 February 1981
- (New Zealand) Meeanee Speedway, Napier
- First 8 to Australasian Final

Pos.	Rider	Heat Scores	Total
1	Ivan Mauger	3,3,3,3,3	15
2	Mitch Shirra	3,3,3,3,2	14
3	Larry Ross	3,3,2,2,3	13
4	Wayne Brown	1,3,3,3,1	11
5	Mike Fullerton	2,2,2,1,3	10
6	David Bargh	3,2,1,2,2	10
7	Tony Briggs	2,2,2,2,1	9
8	Greame Beardsley	1,1,3,2,1	8
9	John Goodall	0,1,1,3,3	8
10	Mark Dekok	2,1,2,0,0	5
11	Gavin Rhodes	2,1,1,1,0	5
12	Greg Joynt	0,2,1,0,2	5
13	Max Brown	1,0,0,0,2	3
14	Colin Farquharson	0,0,0,1,1	2
15	Alan Crosbie	0,0,0,1,0	1
16	Patrick Pawson	1,0,0,0,-	1
R1	Bruce Elvey	0	0
R2	Kym Mauger	ns	0

=== Swedish qualification ===
- Top 8 in each heat to Swedish final

(3 May, Motala Arena, Motala)
Pos	Rider	Points
1	Tommy Nilsson	14
2	Tommy Johansson	12
3	Hans Danielsson	12
4	Lillebror Johansson	11
5	Bo Wirebrand	10
6	Börje Klingberg	1
7	Björn Andersson	10
8	Gert Carlsson	7+3
9	Åke Axelsson	7+2
10	Lars Hammarberg	6
11	Thomas Hydling	5
12	Alf Trofast	5
13	Conny Samuelsson	4
14	Sören Karlsson	4
15	Tommy Steen	2
16	Bengt Gustavsson	1
17	Ulf Blomqvist (res)	0

(8 May, Grevby Motorstadion, Mariestad)
Pos	Rider	Points
1	Anders Michanek	14
2	Bernt Persson	13
3	Karl-Erik Claesson	12
4	Lennart Bengtsson	12
5	Åke Fridell	11
6	Pierre Brannefors	9
7	Lars Rosberg	8+3
8	Richard Hellsén	8+2
9	Uno Johansson	8+1
10	Bengt Jansson	5
11	Sören Brolin	4
12	Anders Eriksson (res)	4
13	Raymond Forsberg	3
14	Börje Ring	3
15	Jan Ericsson	3
16	Lars Ericsson	1
17	Per-Ove Gudmundsson	1
18	Håkan Andersson (res)	1

=== British semi-finals ===
- 13 May
- (England) Wimborne Road, Poole
- Top 8 to British final

Pos.	Rider	Points
1	Dave Jessup	13
2	Steve Bastable	13
3	Gordon Kennett	12
4	John Davis	11
5	Phil Collins	11
6	Kevin Jolly	9
7	Kevin Smith	9
8	Malcolm Simmons	9
9	Roger Johns	8
10	Bob Garrad	6
11	Paul Woods	5
12	Dave Morton	4
13	Neil Middleditch	4
14	Nigel Flatman	3
15	Andy Grahame	2
16	Alan Molyneux	0

- 14 May
- (England) Owlerton Stadium, Sheffield
- Top 8 to British final

Pos.	Rider	Points
1	Les Collins	14
2	Chris Morton	13
3	Kenny Carter	13
4	Michael Lee	11
5	Melvyn Taylor	11
6	John Louis	9
7	Ian Cartwright	9
8	Eric Broadbelt	8
9	Alan Grahame	7
10	Kevin Hawkins	6
11	Jim McMillan	6
12	Joe Owen	5
13	Peter Prinsloo	3
14	Doug Wyer	3
15	Reg Wilson	2
16	Ian Gledhill	0

== Third round ==
=== Continental quarter-finals ===
Top 32 to Continental semi-finals

Date	Venue	Winner	2nd	3rd
10 May	(Italy) Santa Marina Stadium, Lonigo	(Netherlands) Henny Kroeze	(West Germany) Georg Hack	(Czechoslovakia) Aleš Dryml Sr.
10 May	(West Germany) Breitwangbahn, Bopfingen	(West Germany) Egon Muller	(Poland) Zenon Plech	(Soviet Union) Valery Gordeev
10 May	(Hungary) Borsod Volán Stadion, Miskolc	(Poland) Roman Jankowski	(Czechoslovakia) Zdeněk Kudrna	(Hungary) Zoltan Adorjan
10 May	(Austria) Stadion Wiener Neustadt	(Poland) Jerzy Rembas	(Poland) Andrzej Huszcza	(Soviet Union) Mikhail Starostin

=== Australasian Final ===
- 28 February 1981
- (Australia) Liverpool City Raceway, Sydney
- First 4 to Overseas final plus 1 reserve

Pos.	Rider	Total
1	(New Zealand) Ivan Mauger	15
2	(Australia) Danny Kennedy	11+3
3	(New Zealand) Larry Ross	11+2
4	(Australia) Phil Herne	11+1
5	(Australia) Billy Sanders	10+3
6	(Australia) Phil Crump	10+2
7	(Australia) Gary Guglielmi	9
8	(New Zealand) Mitch Shirra	8
9	(Australia) John Titman	7
10	(Australia) Mick McKeon	7
11	(New Zealand) Tony Briggs	6
12	(New Zealand) Wayne Brown	5
13	(New Zealand) David Bargh	2
14	(Australia) Steve Regeling	2
15	(New Zealand) Mike Fullerton	1
16	(New Zealand) Graeme Beardsley	1
17	(Australia) Robert Maxfield (res)	1

=== American Final ===
- 30 May 1981
- (United States) Los Angeles Coliseum, Los Angeles
- First 4 to Overseas final

Placing	Rider	Total	1	2	3	4	5	6	7	8	9	10	11	12	13	14	15	16	17	18	19	20	Pts	Pos	21
1	(United States) (1) Bruce Penhall	15	3				3				3				3				3				15	1	
2	(United States) (9) Dennis Sigalos	13			3		1						3					3		3			13	2	3
3	(United States) (3) Kelly Moran	13	2						3				2				3				3		13	3	2
4	(United States) (5) Scott Autrey	10		2			0					3					2					3	10	4	3
5	(United States) (16) Shawn Moran	10				3				3	2						1			1			10	5	2
6	(United States) (13) Alan Christian	10				1	2							3		3					1		10	6	1
7	(United States) (15) Denny Pyeatt	10				2			2			2						2	2				10	7	0
8	(United States) (2) Mike Faria	8	0					3				1				2				2			8	8	
9	(United States) (8) Bobby Schwartz	7		3						2			1			0			1				7	9	
10	(United States) (11) Steve Gresham	7			2				1		1					1						2	7	10	
11	(United States) (6) David De Temple	6		1				2			0							1			2		6	11	
12	(United States) (4) Brad Oxley	4	1							1				2				0				0	4	12	
13	(United States) (14) Keith Chrisco	4				0		1					0		2							1	4	13	
14	(United States) (10) Steve Columbo	1			1			0						0			0		0				1	14	
15	(United States) (12) Jefrey Tomlin	0			0					0		0			0						0		0	15	
16	(United States) (7) Dubb Ferrell	0		0					F					-	-					-			0	16	
R1	(United States) (R1) Bobby McLain	1												1						0			1	R1	
R2	(United States) (R2) Dan McConnell	1													1								1	R2	
Placing	Rider	Total	1	2	3	4	5	6	7	8	9	10	11	12	13	14	15	16	17	18	19	20	Pts	Pos	21

m - exclusion for exceeding two minute time allowance • t - exclusion for touching the tapes • x - other exclusion • e - retired or mechanical failure • f - fell • ns - non-starter • nc - non-classify

gate A - inside	gate B	gate C	gate D - outside

=== British Final ===
- 3 June 1981
- (England) Brandon Stadium, Coventry
- First 8 to Overseas final plus 1 reserve

Placing	Rider	Total	1	2	3	4	5	6	7	8	9	10	11	12	13	14	15	16	17	18	19	20	Pts	Pos	21
1	(England) (3) Steve Bastable	13	2						3				3				3				2		13	1	3
2	(England) (2) Kenny Carter	13	3					2				3				2				3			13	2	2
3	(England) (5) John Louis	13		3			3					2					2					3	13	3	1
4	(England) (4) Les Collins	12	1							3				3				3				2	12	4	
5	(England) (10) Chris Morton	10			3			3						2			1		1				10	5	
6	(England) (6) Dave Jessup	9		2				1			1							2			3		9	6	
7	(England) (16) Michael Lee	8				3				1	3						0			1			8	7	
8	(England) (15) Ian Cartwright	7				2			0			1						1	3				7	8	
9	(England) (13) Malcolm Simmons	6				0	2							1		3					0		6	9	3
10	(England) (11) Eric Broadbelt	6			0				2		2					1						1	6	10	2
11	(England) (9) Phil Collins	6			2		0						2					0		2			6	11	1
12	(England) (7) Melvyn Taylor	5		1					1					0	3					0			5	12	
13	(England) (1) John Davis	5	-				1				0				2				2				5	13	
14	(England) (12) Gordon Kennett	5			1					2		0			1						1		5	14	
15	(England) (14) Kevin Smith	2				1		0					1		0							0	2	15	
16	(England) (8) Kevin Jolly	0		0						0			0			0			0				0	16	
R1	(England) (R1) Keith White	0	0																				0	R1	
Placing	Rider	Total	1	2	3	4	5	6	7	8	9	10	11	12	13	14	15	16	17	18	19	20	Pts	Pos	21

m - exclusion for exceeding two minute time allowance • t - exclusion for touching the tapes • x - other exclusion • e - retired or mechanical failure • f - fell • ns - non-starter • nc - non-classify

gate A - inside	gate B	gate C	gate D - outside

=== Norwegian Final ===
- 26 April 1981
- (Norway) Elgane Speedway, Varhaug
- First 2 to Nordic final

Pos.	Rider	Total
1	Rolf Gramstad	15
2	Audun Ove Olsen	13
3	Jorn Haufvalstad	12
4	Trond Helge Skretting	11
5	Dag Haaland	10
6	Ingve Madland	9
7	Terje Tollefsen	7
8	Kurt Ueland	7
9	Geir Aasland	7
10	Roy Otto	6
11	Asgeir Bjerga	6
12	Dagfin Jorgensen	5
13	Sigvart Pedersen	5
14	Kjell Gimre	5
15	Rolf Havirstad	2
16	Oddmund Bye	0

=== Danish Final ===
- 10 May 1981
- (Denmark) Fjelsted Speedway Stadium, Harndrup
- First 6 to Nordic final

Pos.	Rider	Total
1	Ole Olsen	15
2	Bo Petersen	13
3	Erik Gundersen	12+3
4	Tommy Knudsen	12+2
5	Hans Nielsen	12+1
6	Jens Henry Nielsen	8+3
7	Finn Thomsen	8+2
8	Preben Eriksen	8+1
9	Finn Rune Jensen	7
10	Mikael Lohmann	7
11	Bent Rasmussen	5
12	Steen Mastrup	5
13	Hans Ove Christiansen	4
14	Bent Juul Larsen	3
15	Svend Lund	0
16	Klaus Lohman	0
R1	Finn Lundahl	1

=== Finland Final ===
- (Finland) Pippo Speedway, Lahti
- 7 September 1980, top 2 (+1 seeded rider) to 1981 Nordic final

Pos.	Rider	Total
1	Kai Niemi	15
2	Ari Koponen	14
3	Veijo Tuoriniemi	12
4	Olli Tyrvainen	10
5	Veli Pekka Kunelius	10
6	Ilkka Teromaa	9
7	Pekka Hautamaki	8
8	Timo Kiansten	7
9	Markku Parkkari	7
10	Ossi Henriksson	6
11	Veikko Haapamaki	6
12	Hannu Larronmaa	5
13	Pekka Turkia	4
14	Markku Haapala	3
15	Ari Heinonen	1
16	Kari Yrjanainen (res)	1
17	Jarmo Puttonen (res)	1
18	Seppo Palomaki	1
19	Heimo Kaikko (res)	0

=== Swedish Final ===
- 17 May 1981
- (Sweden) Gislaved Motorbana, Gislaved
- First 4 to Nordic final, Jan Andersson seeded to Nordic final

Pos.	Rider	Total
1	Anders Michanek	12
2	Tommy Nilsson	11+3
3	Hans Danielsson	11+2
4	Bernt Persson	11+1
5	Bo Wirebrand	10+3
6	Börje Klingberg	10+2
7	Richard Hellsén	9
8	Björn Andersson	8
9	Lennart Bengtsson	7
10	Tommy Johansson	7
11	Pierre Brannefors	6
12	Åke Fridell	6
13	Gerd Carlsson	4
14	Lars Rosberg	4
15	Lillebror Johansson	3
16	Karl-Erik Claesson	1

== Fourth round ==
=== Continental semi-finals ===
- 13 June
- (West Germany) Ellermühle Speedway Stadium, Landshut
- Top 8 to Continental final

Pos.	Rider	Points
1	(Poland) Zenon Plech	12
2	(West Germany) Georg Hack	12
3	(Czechoslovakia) Milan Špinka	11
4	(Soviet Union) Valerij Gordeev	11
5	(Czechoslovakia) Jiří Štancl	11
6	(Czechoslovakia) Aleš Dryml Sr.	9
7	(West Germany) Egon Müller	9
8	(West Germany) Waldemar Bacik	8+3
9	(Czechoslovakia) Jan Verner	8+2
10	(Czechoslovakia) Jan Hadek	7
11	(West Germany) George Gilgenreiner (res)	5
12	(West Germany) Josef Aigner	4
13	(West Germany) Christoph Betzl	4
14	(Netherlands) Henny Kroeze	4
15	(Soviet Union) Anatolij Maximov	3
16	(Soviet Union) Viktor Kuznetsov	1
17	(Soviet Union) Piotr Pyszny	0
18	(West Germany) Wolfgang Mayr	0

- 14 June
- (Poland) Alfred Smoczyk Stadium, Leszno
- Top 8 to Continental final

Pos.	Rider	Points
1	(Poland) Edward Jancarz	11
2	(Poland) Jerzy Rembas	11
3	(Czechoslovakia) Zdenek Kudrna	11
4	(Poland) Roman Jankowski	10
5	(Poland) Marek Kepa	10
6	(Czechoslovakia) Petr Kucera	10
7	(Soviet Union) Grigory Khlinovsky	10
8	(Poland) Marek Towalski	9+3
9	(Poland) Henryk Olszak	9+2
10	(West Germany) Alois Wiesböck	7
11	(Soviet Union) Michail Starostin	6
12	(Poland) Andrzej Huszcza	4
13	(Soviet Union) Pavel Khlynovski	3
14	(Czechoslovakia) Václav Verner	2
15	(Austria) Heinrich Schatzer	2
16	(Hungary) Jozsef Sziraczki	1

=== Overseas Final ===
- 12 July 1981
- (England) White City Stadium, London
- First 10 to Intercontinental final plus 1 reserve

Placing	Rider	Total	1	2	3	4	5	6	7	8	9	10	11	12	13	14	15	16	17	18	19	20	Pts	Pos	21
1	(England) (14) Dave Jessup	13				3		3					3		3							1	13	1	
2	(England) (7) Chris Morton	11		2					1					3	2					3			11	2	
3	(United States) (9) Bruce Penhall	10			3		2						2					3		X			10	3	3
4	(United States) (13) Kelly Moran	10				1	3							1		2					3		10	4	2
5	(United States) (15) Dennis Sigalos	10				2			2			3						1	2				10	5	1
6	(New Zealand) (11) Larry Ross	9			2				3		3					1						0	9	6	
7	(England) (10) John Louis	9			0			1						2			3		3				9	7	
8	(England) (4) Michael Lee	9	2							2				0				2				3	9	8	
9	(England) (16) Kenny Carter	8				0				3	1						2			2			8	9	
10	(New Zealand) (5) Ivan Mauger	8		3			1					1					1					2	8	10	
11	(England) (1) Les Collins	7	3				0				2				1				1				7	11	
12	(England) (8) Steve Bastable	6		1						1			1			3			0				6	12	
13	(England) (6) Ian Cartwright	4		0				2			0							0			2		4	13	
14	(United States) (2) Scott Autrey	4	1					0				2				0				1			4	14	
15	(Australia) (12) Danny Kennedy	2			1					0		0			0						1		2	15	
16	(Australia) (3) Phil Herne	0	0						0				0				0				E		0	16	
Placing	Rider	Total	1	2	3	4	5	6	7	8	9	10	11	12	13	14	15	16	17	18	19	20	Pts	Pos	21

m - exclusion for exceeding two minute time allowance • t - exclusion for touching the tapes • x - other exclusion • e - retired or mechanical failure • f - fell • ns - non-starter • nc - non-classify

gate A - inside	gate B	gate C	gate D - outside

=== Nordic Final ===
- 2 June 1981
- (Sweden) Norrköping Motorstadion, Norrköping
- First 6 to Intercontinental final plus 1 reserve

Pos.	Rider	Heat Scores	Total
1	(Denmark) Tommy Knudsen	3,3,3,3,3	15
2	(Denmark) Hans Nielsen	2,3,3,2,3	13
3	(Denmark) Ole Olsen	2,3,2,3,2	12
4	(Denmark) Preben Eriksen	3,2,2,2,3	12
5	(Sweden) Jan Andersson	3,2,1,3,2	11
6	(Denmark) Erik Gundersen	2,1,3,3,1	10+3
7	(Denmark) Bo Petersen	3,3,0,2,2	10+ns
8	(Finland) Kai Niemi	1,1,1,2,3	8
9	(Finland) Ari Koponen	E,0,2,1,2	5
10	(Sweden) Tommy Nilsson	1,1,2,1,0	5
11	(Sweden) Hans Danielsson	1,2,0,1,1	5
12	(Norway) Audun Ove Olsen	1,1,1,1,0	4
13	(Norway) Rolf Gramstad	E,2,1,0,1	4
14	(Sweden) Bernt Persson	0,F,3,0,-	3
15	(Sweden) Anders Michanek	2,0,-,-,-	2
16	(Finland) Pekka Hautamäki	F,0,0,0,1	1
17	(Denmark) Finn Thomsen (Res)	0,0	0
18	(Sweden) Bo Wirebrand (Res)	0,0	0

== Fifth round ==
=== Continental Final ===
- 25 July 1981
- (Czechoslovakia) Marketa Stadium, Prague
- First 5 to World final plus 1 reserve

Pos.	Rider	Heat Scores	Total
1	(West Germany) Egon Müller	3,3,3,3,X	12+2+3
2	(Czechoslovakia) Aleš Dryml Sr.	3,0,3,3,3	12+3+2
3	(Poland) Edward Jancarz	3,2,2,2,3	12+2+1
4	(Czechoslovakia) Jiří Štancl	2,3,2,3,2	12+2+0
5	(Poland) Zenon Plech	2,3,3,3,1	12+E+E
6	(Poland) Henryk Olszak	2,1,2,1,3	9+3
7	(Czechoslovakia) Jan Verner	0,2,3,2,2	9+2
8	(Poland) Marek Kepa	3,1,1,2,1	8
9	(Poland) Roman Jankowski	1,3,1,1,0	6
10	(Czechoslovakia) Zdeněk Kudrna	1,1,0,1,3	6
11	(Czechoslovakia) Milan Špinka	0,2,2,2,-	6
12	(Czechoslovakia) Petr Kucera	2,0,X,1,2	5
13	(West Germany) Waldemar Bacik	0,1,1,0,1	3
14	(Poland) Marek Towalski	0,2,0,0,0	2
15	(West Germany) Georg Hack	1,X,F,0,-	1
16	(Soviet Union) Valery Gordeev	1,0,0,0,0	1
R1	(Czechoslovakia) Petr Ondrašík	0,2	2
R2	(Czechoslovakia) Antonín Kasper, Jr.	1	1

=== Intercontinental Final ===
- 25 July 1981
- (Denmark) Vojens Speedway Center, Vojens
- First 11 to World final plus 1 reserve

Placing	Rider	Total	1	2	3	4	5	6	7	8	9	10	11	12	13	14	15	16	17	18	19	20	Pts	Pos	21
1	(United States) (14) Bruce Penhall	15				3		3					3		3							3	15	1	
2	(Denmark) (10) Erik Gundersen	12			3			2						3			1		3				12	2	
3	(Denmark) (4) Hans Nielsen	11	3							2				2				2				2	11	3	3
4	(England) (8) Kenny Carter	11		3						1			2			3			2				11	4	2
5	(England) (16) Dave Jessup	10				1				3	3						0			3			10	5	
6	(Denmark) (15) Tommy Knudsen	9				2			1			2						3	1				9	6	
7	(England) (3) Michael Lee	8	1						3				1				3				F		8	7	
8	(Sweden) (5) Jan Andersson	8		1			1					3					2					1	8	8	
9	(England) (11) Chris Morton	8			2				2		2					2						0	8	9	
10	(New Zealand) (12) Larry Ross	7			1					0		1			2						3		7	10	
11	(Denmark) (2) Ole Olsen	6	2					1				0				1				2			6	11	
12	(Denmark) (13) Preben Eriksen	5				0	2							1		F					2		5	12	
13	(New Zealand) (9) Ivan Mauger	4			0		3						0					1		0			4	13	
14	(England) (7) John Louis	4		2					0					0	1					1			4	14	
15	(United States) (6) Dennis Sigalos	1		0				0			1							0			F		1	15	
16	(United States) (1) Kelly Moran	0	F				0				0				E				0				0	16	
R1	(Denmark) (R1) Bo Petersen	0																					0	R1	
R2	(England) (R2) Les Collins	0																					0	R2	
Placing	Rider	Total	1	2	3	4	5	6	7	8	9	10	11	12	13	14	15	16	17	18	19	20	Pts	Pos	21

m - exclusion for exceeding two minute time allowance • t - exclusion for touching the tapes • x - other exclusion • e - retired or mechanical failure • f - fell • ns - non-starter • nc - non-classify

gate A - inside	gate B	gate C	gate D - outside

== World Final ==
- 5 September 1981
- (England) Wembley Stadium, London.
- Referee: ( (Australia) ) Sam Bass
- Attendance: 92,500

Placing	Rider	Total	1	2	3	4	5	6	7	8	9	10	11	12	13	14	15	16	17	18	19	20	Pts	Pos
1	(United States) (11) Bruce Penhall	14			3				3		3					3						2	14	1
2	(Denmark) (3) Ole Olsen	12+3	2						2				3				2				3		12	2
3	(Denmark) (2) Tommy Knudsen	12+2	3					2				2				2				3			12	3
4	(Denmark) (10) Erik Gundersen	11			2			3						0			3		3				11	4
5	(England) (5) Kenny Carter	11		3			2					3					e					3	11	5
6	(Sweden) (12) Jan Andersson	9			1					2		1			3						2		9	6
7	(West Germany) (7) Egon Müller	9		1					1					3	2					2			9	7
8	(England) (16) Dave Jessup	7				3				3	e						e			1			7	8
9	(Denmark) (15) Hans Nielsen	6				2			0			0						2	2				6	9
10	(England) (9) Michael Lee	5			0		3						2					0		f			5	10
11	(England) (8) Chris Morton	5		2						1			1			1			0				5	11
12	(Poland) (1) Edward Jancarz	5	1				1				1				1				1				5	12
13	(New Zealand) (4) Larry Ross	4	0							t				1				3				0	4	13
14	(Czechoslovakia) (13) Aleš Dryml Sr.	3				0	0							2		0					1		3	14
15	(Poland) (6) Zenon Plech	3		f				0			2							1			0		3	15
16	(Czechoslovakia) (14) Jiří Štancl	3				1		1					0		0							1	3	16
Res	(Poland) (17) Henryk Olszak	0								0													0	Res
Res	(Denmark) (18) Preben Eriksen	0																					0	Res
Placing	Rider	Total	1	2	3	4	5	6	7	8	9	10	11	12	13	14	15	16	17	18	19	20	Pts	Pos

m - exclusion for exceeding two minute time allowance • t - exclusion for touching the tapes • x - other exclusion • e - retired or mechanical failure • f - fell • ns - non-starter • nc - non-classify

gate A - inside	gate B	gate C	gate D - outside
