= 1979 Australasian Individual Speedway Championship =

Seasons
- ← 1978 1980 →

The 1979 Australasian Individual Speedway Championship was the fourth annual Australasian Final for Motorcycle speedway riders from Australia and New Zealand as part of the qualification for the 1979 Speedway World Championship.

In the track's final season of operation, the 358 metres (392 yards) Rowley Park Speedway in Adelaide hosted the Australasian Final. Reigning Australian Champion Billy Sanders won the Final from Steve Koppe and John Titman. The final three qualifiers for the Commonwealth Final to be held at London's White City Stadium were Phil Crump, Ivan Mauger and Larry Ross. Later in 1979 Mauger would go on to win his record 6th World Championship at the Silesian Stadium in Chorzów, Poland.

Inaugural Australasian Final winner and local Rowley Park hero John Boulger failed on the night, scoring only 6 points from his 5 rides to finish in 11th place.

== 1979 Australasian Final ==
- 23 February
- Adelaide, Australia - Rowley Park Speedway
- Referee: ( (Norway) ) Torrie Kittlesen
- Qualification: First 6 plus 1 reserve to the Commonwealth Final in London, England

Pos.	Rider	Total
1	(Australia) Billy Sanders	13
2	(Australia) Steve Koppe	12
3	(Australia) John Titman	11+3
4	(Australia) Phil Crump	11+2
5	(New Zealand) Ivan Mauger	11+1
6	(New Zealand) Larry Ross	10+3
7	(New Zealand) Mitch Shirra	10+2
8	(Australia) Gary Guglielmi	8
9	(New Zealand) John Goodall	8
10	(Australia) Danny Kennedy	6
11	(Australia) John Boulger	6
12	(Australia) Glyn Taylor	6
13	(New Zealand) Tony Briggs (Res)	4
14	(New Zealand) Graeme Stapleton	2
15	(New Zealand) David Bargh (Res)	2
16	(New Zealand) Roger Wright	0

== See also ==
- Sport in Australia
- Motorcycle Speedway
