= 1980 British League season =

British motorcycle speedway season

- League: British League
- No. of competitors: 17
- Champions: Reading Racers
- Knockout Cup: Cradley Heath Heathens
- Individual: Les Collins
- Gold Cup: King's Lynn Stars
- Midland League: Coventry Bees
- Midland Cup: Cradley Heathens
- Northern Trophy: Halifax Dukes
- London Cup: Wimbledon Dons
- Highest average: Hans Nielsen
- Division/s below: 1980 National League

The 1980 British League season was the 46th season of the top tier of motorcycle speedway in the United Kingdom and the 16th season known as the British League.

== Summary ==
The league comprised 17 teams - one fewer than the previous season. Exeter Falcons had dropped down to the National League. Hackney Hawks underwent a dramatic transformation from being the bottom side in 1979 to title contenders in 1980, but their challenge faded in the last few weeks and Reading Racers were crowned champions for the second time.

Reading's success came down to three strong heat leaders, Swedish champion Jan Andersson, their new American signing Bobby Schwartz and England international John Davis. All three produced season averages around the 10 mark, which enabled the team to constantly pick up victories. Cradley Heathens successfully retained their Knockout Cup crown overcoming a huge first leg deficit in the final.

Hans Nielsen topped the averages for the first time in his career. Neither Ivan Mauger or Ole Olsen finished in the top 10 in averages, as well as both failing to qualify directly for that years’ World Final (Olsen went as reserve). The young American riders continued to improve as more arrived in Britain, with Bruce Penhall qualifying for the World Final and Dennis Sigalos pipping Mauger to be Hull Vikings' top scorer.

== Final table ==
Pos	Team	PL	W	D	L	Pts
1	Reading Racers	32	24	1	7	49
2	Hackney Hawks	32	23	0	9	46
3	Belle Vue Aces	32	21	1	10	43
4	Coventry Bees	32	20	2	10	42
5	Cradley Heath Heathens	32	20	0	12	40
6	Ipswich Witches	32	16	2	14	34
7	King's Lynn Stars	32	17	0	15	34
8	Swindon Robins	32	16	2	14	34
9	Poole Pirates	32	15	2	15	32
10	Halifax Dukes	32	15	1	16	31
11	Leicester Lions	32	14	0	18	28
12	Hull Vikings	32	11	5	16	27
13	Wimbledon Dons	32	12	2	18	26
14	Birmingham Brummies	32	11	1	20	23
15	Wolverhampton Wolves	32	9	2	21	20
16	Eastbourne Eagles	32	9	1	22	19
17	Sheffield Tigers	32	8	0	24	16

M = Matches; W = Wins; D = Draws; L = Losses; Pts = Total Points

== Fixtures and results ==
Home \ Away	BV	BIR	COV	CH	EAS	HAC	HAL	HV	IPS	KL	LEI	PP	RR	SHE	SWI	WIM	WOL
Belle Vue		41–37	40–38	42–36	53–25	49–29	44–34	43–35	44–34	40–38	41–37	45–33	43–35	47–30	52–25	46–31	41–37
Birmingham	37–41		35–43	45–33	33–45	44–34	41–37	44–34	42–36	34–44	41–37	41–37	32–46	41–37	35–43	46–32	36–42
Coventry	44–34	45–33		36.5–41.5	47–31	52–26	47–31	52–26	42–36	43–35	43–35	47–31	40–38	48–30	44–34	49–29	45–33
Cradley Heath	42–36	49–29	44.5–33.5		57–21	44–34	40–38	45–33	53–25	40–38	39–38	42–36	46–32	50–28	46–32	51–27	44–34
Eastbourne	45–33	37–41	47–31	45–31		34–43	41–37	37–41	40–38	42–36	31–47	34–44	26–52	46–32	30–48	39–39	41–37
Hackney	45–33	41–37	44–34	37–40	44–34		45–32	46–31	46–32	40–38	43–35	44–34	40–38	53–25	43–35	56–22	52–26
Halifax	46–32	44–34	37–41	40–38	52–26	38–39		48–30	44–34	42–36	43–35	42–36	39–39	49–29	42–36	40–38	51–27
Hull	38–40	51–27	39–39	42–36	46–32	38–40	32–46		39–39	41–37	42–36	39–39	40–38	60–18	42–36	44–33	41–36
Ipswich	41–36	54–24	43–35	46–32	48–30	49–28	56–22	43–35		40–38	48–30	45–33	31–47	59–19	48–30	50–27	38–40
King's Lynn	43–34	49–29	46–32	52–26	63–15	43–35	48–30	56–22	40–38		44–33	50–28	38–40	58–20	44–34	44–34	41–37
Leicester	37–41	46–32	42–36	40–38	49–29	38–40	51–27	43–35	42–36	40–38		42–36	32–46	48–30	38–40	45–33	43–35
Poole	43–35	43–35	37–41	48–30	46–32	45–32	57–21	39–39	47–31	41–37	41–37		38–40	44–34	44–34	43–35	43–32
Reading	47–31	45–33	43–35	40–38	52–26	47–31	48–30	43–35	56–22	52–26	53–25	47–31		54–24	38–40	53–25	49–29
Sheffield	27–51	38–40	31–47	48–30	46–32	38–40	34–43	43–35	37–41	43–35	28–50	34–43	41–37		45–33	41–37	44–34
Swindon	39–39	52–26	43–35	35–43	43–35	32–46	44–34	46–32	39–39	40–38	45–33	49–29	33–45	59–19		41–37	46–32
Wimbledon	36–42	43–35	39–39	44–34	47–31	37–41	51–24	47–31	40–37	40–38	44–34	47–31	35–43	49–29	43–35		40–38
Wolverhampton	49–29	39–39	36–42	34–43	43–34	34–43	42–36	39–39	37–41	36–42	43–35	44–34	27–51	61–17	35–43	44–34	

Legend: Blue = home team win; Yellow = draw; Red = away team win.

== Top ten riders (league averages) ==
	Rider	Nat	Team	C.M.A.
1	Peter Collins	(England)	Belle Vue	10.70
2	Hans Nielsen	(Denmark)	Wolverhampton	10.70
3	Dave Jessup	(England)	King's Lynn	10.52
4	Bo Petersen	(Denmark)	Hackney	10.46
5	Bruce Penhall	(United States)	Cradley	10.46
6	Michael Lee	(England)	King's Lynn	10.17
7	Chris Morton	(England)	Belle Vue	10.11
8	Jan Andersson	(Sweden)	Reading	10.08
9	Scott Autrey	(United States)	Swindon	9.97
10	Bobby Schwartz	(United States)	Reading	9.95

== British League Knockout Cup ==
The 1980 Speedway Star British League Knockout Cup was the 42nd edition of the Knockout Cup for tier one teams. Cradley Heath were the winners.

First round

Date	Team one	Score	Team two
06/05	Leicester	59-49	Poole
05/05	Poole	53-55	Leicester

Second round

Date	Team one	Score	Team two
17/07	Coventry	54-54	Birmingham
09/07	Cradley Heath	60-48	Kings Lynn
04/07	Wolverhampton	53-55	Sheffield
09/06	Birmingham	56-51	Coventry
06/06	Eastbourne	52.5-55.5	Swindon
05/06	Sheffield	56-52	Wolverhampton
03/06	Hull	67-41	Hackney
31/05	Belle Vue	60-48	Wimbledon
31/05	Halifax	57-50	Reading
31/05	Swindon	62-46	Eastbourne
30/05	Hackney	45-63	Hull
29/05	Wimbledon	57-51	Belle Vue
29/05	Ipswich	66-42	Leicester
27/05	Leicester	54-54	Ipswich
25/05	Kings Lynn	58-50	Cradley Heath
21/04	Reading	62-46	Halifax

Quarter-finals

Date	Team one	Score	Team two
03/09	Birmingham	76-30	Sheffield
23/08	Belle Vue	68-40	Hull
21/08	Cradley Heath	54-54	Reading
21/08	Sheffield	49-58	Birmingham
04/08	Reading	53-55	Cradley Heath
19/07	Swindon	63-45	Ipswich
17/07	Ipswich	55-53	Swindon
09/07	Hull	66-42	Belle Vue

Semi-finals

Date	Team one	Score	Team two
01/10	Cradley Heath	67-41	Birmingham
24/09	Belle Vue	59-49	Swindon
15/09	Birmingham	56-52	Cradley Heath
30/08	Swindon	56-52	Belle Vue

Final

First leg

11 October 1980

Belle Vue Aces Chris Morton 14 Rob Maxfield 14 Peter Collins 13 Pekka Hautamaki 10 Louis Carr 5 Steve Wilcock 5 Dave Allen 4 Derek Richardson 2	67 - 41	Cradley Heath Phil Collins 13 Alan Grahame 13 Erik Gundersen 7 Ila Teromaa 6 John Hack 1 Steve Lawson 1 Craig Featherby 0 Bruce Penhall R/R

Hyde Road Stadium

Second leg

29 October 1980

Cradley Heath Bruce Penhall 15 Erik Gundersen 13 Phil Collins 12 Alan Grahame 11 Andy Reid 9 Ila Teromaa 8 Steve Lawson 5 Craig Featherby 5	75 - 33	Belle Vue Aces Pekka Hautamaki 10 Louis Carr 10 Tony Boyle 6 John Williams 4 Chris Morton 2 (inj) Peter Collins 1 (inj) Dave Allen 0 Mark Lohmann R/R

Dudley Wood Stadium

Cradley Heath were declared Knockout Cup Champions, winning on aggregate 116-100.

== Riders' Championship ==
Les Collins won the British League Riders' Championship, held at Hyde Road on 18 October and sponsored by Gauntlet (Leyland Used Cars).

Pos.	Rider	Heat Scores	Total
1	(England) Les Collins	3 3 3 3 2	14
2	(United States) Bruce Penhall	1 2 3 3 3	12
3	(New Zealand) Larry Ross	3 3 1 2 2	11
4	(Sweden) Jan Andersson	2 1 3 3 1	10
5	(England) Peter Collins	2 1 2 2 3	10
6	(Denmark) Hans Nielsen	3 2 2 1 2	10
7	(England) Kenny Carter	3 3 0 0 3	9
8	(United States) Scott Autrey	2 2 1 0 3	8
9	(Denmark) Ole Olsen	2 3 1 1 0	7
10	(United States) Dennis Sigalos	0 0 2 2 2	6
11	(England) Steve Bastable	0 1 1 2 1	5
12	(England) John Louis	1 1 3 0 0	5
13	(Denmark) Bo Petersen	0 0 0 3 1	4
14	(England) Michael Lee	1 2 0 - -	3
15	(England) Malcolm Simmons	1 0 2 0 0	3
16	(England) Bernie Collier (res)	1 1 - - -	2
17	(England) Gordon Kennett	0 0 0 1 -	1
18	(England) Mike Wilding (res)	0 - - - -	0

- ef=engine failure, f=fell, x=excluded r-retired

== Final leading averages ==
	Rider	Nat	Team	C.M.A.
1	Hans Nielsen	(Denmark)	Wolverhampton	10.69
2	Peter Collins	(England)	Belle Vue	10.67
=3	Dave Jessup	(England)	King's Lynn	10.39
=3	Bruce Penhall	(United States)	Cradley	10.39
5	Bo Petersen	(Denmark)	Hackney	10.27
6	Michael Lee	(England)	King's Lynn	10.14
7	Chris Morton	(England)	Belle Vue	10.09
8	Jan Andersson	(Sweden)	Reading	10.04
9	Bobby Schwartz	(United States)	Reading	10.00
10	Scott Autrey	(United States)	Swindon	9.92

== Gold Cup ==
East Group

Team	PL	W	D	L	Pts
King's Lynn	6	4	1	1	9
Ipswich	6	4	0	2	8
Reading	6	3	1	2	7
Hackney	6	0	0	6	0

West Group

Team	PL	W	D	L	Pts
Poole	4	3	0	1	6
Eastbourne	4	2	0	2	4
Swindon	4	1	0	3	2

East Group

Home \ Away	HAC	IPS	KL	REA
Hackney		34–44	20–57	38–40
Ipswich	41–37		38–40	41–37
King's Lynn	58–20	27–51		41–37
Reading	54–23	44–34	39–39	

Legend: Blue = home team win; Yellow = draw; Red = away team win.

West Group

Home \ Away	EAS	PP	SWI
Eastbourne		40–38	50–28
Poole	42–36		43–35
Swindon	44–34	37–40	

Legend: Blue = home team win; Yellow = draw; Red = away team win.

Final

Team one	Team two	Score
Poole	King's Lynn	39-39, 36-41

== Midland Cup ==
Cradley Heath won the Midland Cup, sponsored by the Trustee Savings Bank. The competition consisted of six teams.

First round

Team one	Team two	Score
Swindon	Wolverhampton	43–35, 39–39
Cradley	Birmingham	51–27, 48–30

Semi final round

Team one	Team two	Score
Swindon	Coventry	41–37, 36–42
Leicester	Cradley	35–43, 30–48

== Midland League ==
Team	PL	W	D	L	Pts
Coventry	8	6	1	1	13
Cradley	8	5	0	3	10
Leicester	8	4	1	3	9
Birmingham	8	1	2	5	4
Wolverhampton	8	1	2	5	4

Home \ Away	BIR	COV	CH	LEI	WOL
Birmingham		36–42	36–42	40–37	39–39
Coventry	54–24		49–29	50–28	44–34
Cradley	55–23	44–34		37–41	45–33
Leicester	43–35	39–39	40–38		41–37
Wolverhampton	39–39	36–42	32–46	45–33	

Legend: Blue = home team win; Yellow = draw; Red = away team win.

Final

First leg

2 October 1980

Coventry Ole Olsen 13 Tommy Knudsen 8 Mitch Shirra 7 Alf Busk 5 Rob Henry 3 Alan Molyneux 1 Kevin Hawkins 1	38–40	Cradley Heath Bruce Penhall 12 Alan Grahame 7 Phil Collins 6 Ila Teromaa 6 Erik Gundersen 6 John Hack 2 Andy Reid 1

Brandon Stadium

Second leg

9 October 1980

Cradley Heath Phil Collins 12 Erik Gundersen 11 Bobby Schwartz (guest) 10 Alan Grahame 9 Steve Lawson 4 Ila Teromaa 2 John Hack 0	48–30	Coventry Mitch Shirra 9 Ole Olsen 8 Kevin Hawkins 5 Tommy Knudsen 4 Alf Busk 2 Rob Hollingworth 2 Alan Molyneux 0

Dudley Wood Stadium

Cradley Heath won on aggregate 88–68

== Northern Trophy ==
		M	W	D	L	Pts
1	Halifax	6	5	0	1	10
2	Belle Vue	6	4	0	2	8
3	Hull	6	2	0	4	4
4	Sheffield	6	1	0	5	2

Home \ Away	BV	HAL	HUL	SHE
Belle Vue		42–35	44–34	41–36
Halifax	41–36		40–38	47–31
Hull	45–33	37–41		38–40
Sheffield	38–39	34–44	37–40	

Legend: Blue = home team win; Yellow = draw; Red = away team win.

== London Cup ==
Wimbledon won the London Cup but the competition consisted of just Wimbledon and Hackney.

Results

Team	Score	Team
Wimbledon	43–35	Hackney
Hackney	42–36	Wimbledon

== Riders and final averages ==
Belle Vue

- (England) Peter Collins 10.67
- (England) Chris Morton 10.09
- (Australia) Rob Maxfield 7.69
- (Denmark) Mike Lohmann 6.33
- (England) Derek Richardson 6.24
- (Finland) Pekka Hautamaki 5.35
- (England) Louis Carr 5.17
- (United States) Larry Kosta 4.91
- (England) Dave Allen 4.25
- (England) Steve Wilcock 4.22

Birmingham

- (England) Steve Bastable 8.57
- (United States) Kelly Moran 8.24
- (England) Andy Grahame 7.39
- (Czech Republic) Zdeněk Kudrna 6.22
- (Australia) Phil Herne 6.09
- (Finland) Ari Koponen 5.97
- (Denmark) Finn Jensen 5.93
- (England) Alan Emerson 5.56
- (Czech Republic) Ladislav Hrádecký 3.70
- (England) Mick Blaynee 2.70

Coventry

- (Denmark) Ole Olsen 9.52
- (New Zealand) Mitch Shirra 8.54
- (Denmark) Tommy Knudsen 8.10
- (England) Alan Molyneux 6.83
- (England) Kevin Hawkins 6.27
- (Australia) Gary Guglielmi 5.83
- (Denmark) Alf Busk 5.61
- (England) Rob Hollingworth 4.00

Cradley Heath

- (United States) Bruce Penhall 10.39
- (England) Alan Grahame 8.32
- (England) Phil Collins 8.17
- (England) Dave Perks 8.13
- (Denmark) Erik Gundersen 8.09
- (Finland) Ila Teromaa 5.32
- (England) Steve Lawson 5.16
- (England) Mike Sampson 4.84
- (England) John Hack 4.23
- (England) Derek Harrison 4.05
- (England) Craig Featherby 1.78
- (England) Paul Bosley 0.73

Eastbourne

- (England) Gordon Kennett 9.71
- (Finland) Kai Niemi 8.35
- (England) Paul Woods 6.28
- (Finland) Veijo Tuoriniemi 6.12
- (England) Dave Kennett 5.57
- (England) Trevor Geer 4.87
- (England) Eric Dugard 4.64
- (England) Richard Greer 4.24
- (England) Steve Naylor 3.87
- (Sweden) Jan Davidsson 3.61
- (Norway) Sigvart Pedersen 1.81

Hackney

- (Denmark) Bo Petersen 10.27
- (Poland) Zenon Plech 8.12
- (Denmark) Finn Thomsen 7.76
- (England) Sean Willmott 5.49
- (England) Barry Thomas 5.29
- (Poland) Roman Jankowski 5.19
- (England) Keith White 4.94
- (Poland) Andrzej Huszcza 4.24

Halifax

- (England) Kenny Carter 8.92
- (England) Ian Cartwright 7.92
- (Australia) Mick McKeon 6.54
- (Australia) Merv Janke 6.06
- (Poland) Piotr Pyszny 5.80
- (England) Craig Pendlebury 5.39
- (Australia) Les Sawyer 3.50
- (England) Alan Stansfield 2.86

Hull

- (United States) Dennis Sigalos 9.32
- (New Zealand) Ivan Mauger 9.00
- (England) Joe Owen 7.57
- (Scotland) Bobby Beaton 6.68
- (United States) Shawn Moran 6.47
- (England) Frank Auffret 5.17
- (Australia) John McNeill 4.84
- (New Zealand) David Bargh 4.67
- (Australia) Rod Hunter 4.65
- (United States) John Cook 4.17

Ipswich

- (England) Kevin Jolly 9.09
- (England) John Louis 8.80
- (Australia) Billy Sanders 8.34
- (England) Mike Lanham 7.20
- (Denmark) Preben Eriksen 6.37
- (England) Nigel Flatman 5.82
- (England) Tim Hunt 5.77
- (England) Tony Davey 5.33
- (England) Kevin Teager 4.80
- (England) Andy Hines 4.72

King's Lynn

- (England) Dave Jessup 10.39
- (England) Michael Lee 10.14
- (Sweden) Richard Hellsen 8.95
- (England) Melvyn Taylor 6.52
- (Denmark) Bent Rasmussen 5.22
- (England) Pete Smith 4.26
- (England) Nigel Sparshott 3.82

Leicester

- (England) Les Collins 8.93
- (Australia) John Titman 7.69
- (Norway) Rolf Gramstad 7.42
- (Poland) Andrzej Huszcza 6.38
- (England) Mark Courtney 6.20
- (England) Bob Garrad 5.91
- (England) Colin Cook 5.60
- (England) Ian Clark 5.23

Poole

- (England) Malcolm Simmons 9.40
- (United States) Ron Preston 9.11
- (Zimbabwe) Peter Prinsloo 7.26
- (England) Neil Middleditch 6.96
- (Czech Republic) Vaclav Verner 6.76
- (Australia) Danny Kennedy 4.95
- (England) Martin Yeates 4.77
- (Australia) John McNeill 4.00
- (England) Kevin Bowen 1.11

Reading

- (Sweden) Jan Andersson 10.04
- (United States) Bobby Schwartz 10.00
- (England) John Davis 9.59
- (Czech Republic) Jiří Štancl 7.37
- (England) Bernie Leigh 5.87
- (England) Martin Ashby 5.30
- (England) Tony Briggs 4.98
- (England) Ashley Pullen 1.80

Sheffield

- (England) Reg Wilson 8.00
- (England) Doug Wyer 7.11
- (England) Eric Broadbelt 6.37
- (England) Phil White 6.20
- (Czechoslovakia) Aleš Dryml Sr. 5.56 (6 matches only)
- (England) Neil Collins 5.09
- (England) Nicky Allott 5.04
- (Denmark) Klaus Lohmann 4.86
- (Poland) Jan Ząbik 4.37
- (Netherlands) Henny Kroeze 3.67
- (England) Paul Stead 3.23

Swindon

- (United States) Scott Autrey 9.92
- (Australia) Phil Crump 9.59
- (England) Bob Kilby 7.41
- (United States) Steve Gresham 7.24
- (Czech Republic) Milan Špinka 6.53
- (Denmark) Steen Mastrup 5.54
- (Zimbabwe) Mike Ferreira 5.42
- (England) Malcolm Holloway 5.31
- (Australia) Bob Humphreys 5.00
- (England) John Barker 2.72
- (England) Nigel Boocock 2.00

Wimbledon

- (New Zealand) Larry Ross 9.12
- (England) Roger Johns 8.22
- (Poland) Edward Jancarz 8.08
- (England) Colin Richardson 6.36
- (Sweden) Stefan Salomonsson 5.82
- (England) Mick Hines 5.08
- (Netherlands) Rudy Muts 3.06
- (England) Peter Johns 2.46
- (England) Dave Brewer 2.24

Wolverhampton

- (Denmark) Hans Nielsen 10.69
- (Norway) Reidar Eide 7.08
- (Scotland) Jimmy McMillan 7.01
- (Czech Republic) Petr Ondrašík 5.85
- (New Zealand) Bruce Cribb 5.73
- (England) Dave Morton 5.36
- (Sweden) Hasse Danielsson 5.33
- (England) Billy Burton 5.07
- (England) Ivan Blacka 3.93
- (New Zealand) Wayne Brown 3.68
- (Denmark) Hans Christensen 2.62

== See also ==
- List of United Kingdom Speedway League Champions
- Knockout Cup (speedway)
