= 1981 Australasian Individual Speedway Championship =

Seasons
- ← 1980 none →

The 1981 Australasian Individual Speedway Championship was the sixth annual Australasian Final for Motorcycle speedway riders from Australia and New Zealand as part of the qualification for the 1981 Speedway World Championship.

This was the final time the Australasian Championship was staged. It was held at the 300 metres (330 yards) Liverpool City Raceway in Sydney. The Final was easily won by six time World Champion Ivan Mauger who scored a 15-point maximum to win his second Australasian Championship. Surprisingly, Australia's leading riders Phil Crump and reigning Australian Champion Billy Sanders (who was actually riding on his home track) failed to qualify for the Overseas Final to be held at the White City Stadium in London, England. Sanders won a runoff with Crump to be the reserve rider in London.

== 1981 Australasian Final ==
- February 28
- Sydney, Australia - Liverpool City Raceway
- Referee: ( (Australia) ) Sam Bass
- Qualification: First 4 plus 1 reserve to the Overseas Final in London, England

Pos.	Rider	Total
1	(New Zealand) Ivan Mauger	15
2	(Australia) Danny Kennedy	11+3
3	(New Zealand) Larry Ross	11+2
4	(Australia) Phil Herne	11+1
5	(Australia) Billy Sanders	10+3
6	(Australia) Phil Crump	10+2
7	(Australia) Gary Guglielmi	9
8	(New Zealand) Mitch Shirra	8
9	(Australia) John Titman	7
10	(Australia) Mick McKeon	7
11	(New Zealand) Tony Briggs	6
12	(New Zealand) Wayne Brown	5
13	(New Zealand) David Bargh	2
14	(Australia) Steve Regeling	2
15	(New Zealand) Mike Fullerton	1
16	(New Zealand) Graeme Beardsley	1
17	(Australia) Robert Maxfield (RES)	1

== See also ==
- Sport in Australia
- Motorcycle Speedway
