= 1980 Australasian Individual Speedway Championship =

Seasons
- ← 1979 1981 →

The 1980 Australasian Individual Speedway Championship was the fifth annual Australasian Final for Motorcycle speedway riders from Australia and New Zealand as part of the qualification for the 1980 Speedway World Championship.

The Final was held at the Ruapuna Speedway in Templeton, located just outside Christchurch in New Zealand. Billy Sanders won his second consecutive Australasian Final from John Titman and Larry Ross. As reigning World Champion Ivan Mauger was seeded directly to the Commonwealth Final at the Wimbledon Stadium in London, England and was not required to ride in Templeton, only two other riders (Mitch Shirra and Phil Crump) moved forward into the Commonwealth Final.

== Australasian final ==
- 2 February
- Templeton, New Zealand - Ruapuna Speedway
- Qualification: First 5 plus 1 reserve to the Commonwealth Final in London, England
- Reigning World Champion Ivan Mauger seeded directly to the Commonwealth Final

Pos.	Rider	Total
1	(Australia) Billy Sanders	15
2	(Australia) John Titman	13
3	(New Zealand) Larry Ross	12+3
4	(New Zealand) Mitch Shirra	12+2
5	(Australia) Phil Crump	11+3
6	(New Zealand) Tony Briggs	11+2
7	(Australia) Mike Farrell	10
8	(Australia) Phil Herne	8
9	(Australia) Steve Koppe	7
10	(Australia) Glyn Taylor	5
11	(Australia) Glenn McDonald	5
12	(New Zealand) Graeme Stapleton	3
13	(Australia) Keith Wright	2
14	(New Zealand) David Bargh	2
15	(New Zealand) Mike Fullerton	1
16	(New Zealand) Wayne Brown	1

== See also ==
- Sport in New Zealand
- Motorcycle Speedway
