= 1978 Australasian Individual Speedway Championship =

Seasons
- ← 1977 1979 →

The 1978 Australasian Individual Speedway Championship was the third annual Australasian Final for Motorcycle speedway riders from Australia and New Zealand as part of the qualification for the 1978 Speedway World Championship.

The Final took place at the 413 metres (452 yards) Western Springs Stadium in Auckland and was won by 18-year-old sensation Mitch Shirra. Mick McKeon finished second with John Titman and Mike Farrell the final qualifiers for the 1978 Intercontinental Final to be held at the Fredericia Speedway Center in Fredericia, Denmark.

1977 World Champion Ivan Mauger was not required to ride in Auckland as he had been seeded directly into the Intercontinental Final.

== Australasian Final ==
- February 18
- Auckland, New Zealand - Western Springs Stadium
- Qualification: First 4 to the Intercontinental Final in Fredericia, Denmark
- Reigning World Champion Ivan Mauger seeded directly to the Intercontinental Final.

Pos.	Rider	Total
1	(New Zealand) Mitch Shirra	13
2	(Australia) Mick McKeon	11½
3	(Australia) John Titman	11
4	(Australia) Mike Farrell	11
5	(New Zealand) Mike Fullerton	10
6	(Australia) Phil Herne	10
7	(Australia) John Boulger	9
8	(Australia) Billy Sanders	9
9	(New Zealand) Colin Farquharson	8
10	(New Zealand) Roger Wright	6½
11	(Australia) Robert Maxfield	6
12	(New Zealand) Larry Ross	6
13	(New Zealand) James Moore	5
14	(New Zealand) Colin Tucker	3
15	(New Zealand) Greg Joynt (Res)	1
16	(New Zealand) Alan Brown	0
17	(Australia) Lloyd Cross	0
18	(New Zealand) Cliff Anderson (Res)	0

== See also ==
- Sport in New Zealand
- Motorcycle Speedway
