= 1979 Individual Speedway World Championship =

Motorcycle speedway world championship season

Seasons
- ← 1978 1980 →

The 1979 Individual Speedway World Championship was the 34th edition of the official World Championship to determine the world champion rider.

In his 14th straight World Final appearance (dating back to 1966), New Zealand's Ivan Mauger won his 6th Speedway World Championship, breaking the previous record of 5 wins held by himself and legendary Swede Ove Fundin. Mauger scored 14 points to defeat local favourite Zenon Plech (13) and young English tearaway Michael Lee (11), with Lee the only rider to defeat Mauger on the day. Lee also had to defeat Kelly Moran (USA), Billy Sanders (Australia) and defending champion Ole Olsen in a runoff for third after all four riders finished on 11 points. This would prove to be the last appearance for Ivan Mauger as a rider in a World Final.

Qualification results.

== First round ==
=== British qualification ===
Similar to the previous season, the Sunday Mirror sponsored British qualifying rounds for the World Championship doubled up as qualifying rounds for the Berger-sponsored Grand Prix. Therefore, many non-British riders such as Scott Autrey and Ivan Mauger rode in these meetings scoring points towards the Grand Prix qualification - but their scores didn't count towards World Championship qualification. The Rye House track flooded so the event was moved to Hackney.

Date	Venue	Winner	2nd	3rd
Preliminary Round
8 April	Hackney Wick Stadium, London	Mike Lanham	Dave Perks	Bobby McNeil
8 April	Mildenhall Stadium, Mildenhall	Mick Hines	Geoff Bouchard	Alan Emerson
17 April	Crayford & Bexleyheath Stadium, Crayford	Mike Sampson	Colin Richardson	Bernie Leigh
17 April	Shielfield Park, Berwick	Steve Finch	Eric Broadbelt	Derek Richardson
23 April	Boston Sports Stadium, Boston	Steve Lomas	Malcolm Corradine	John Jackson
Qualifying Round
28 April	Abbey Stadium, Swindon	Phil Crump	Jan Andersson	Scott Autrey
28 April	The Shay, Halifax	Ivan Mauger	Ian Cartwright	Reg Wilson
28 April	Brandon Stadium, Coventry	Mitch Shirra	Alan Molyneux	John Davis
30 April	Smallmead Stadium, Reading	Jan Andersson	John Davis	Bruce Penhall
30 April	County Ground Stadium, Exeter	Scott Autrey	Phil Crump	Colin Richardson
30 April	Birchfield Ladbroke Stadium, Birmingham	Peter Collins	Billy Sanders	Alan Grahame
2 May	Wimborne Road, Poole	Ole Olsen	Dave Morton	Malcolm Simmons
2 May	The Boulevard, Hull	Ivan Mauger	Bobby Beaton	Kenny Carter
3 May	Wimbledon Stadium, London	Colin Richardson	Hans Nielsen	Bruce Penhall
3 May	Owlerton Stadium, Sheffield	Doug Wyer	Craig Pendlebury	Les Collins
4 May	Hackney Wick Stadium, London	John Davis	Mitch Shirra	Ole Olsen
4 May	Monmore Green, Wolverhampton	Kenny Carter	Jim McMillan	Bruce Cribb
4 May	Arlington Stadium, Eastbourne	Roger Johns	Kai Niemi	Dave Jessup
5 May	King's Lynn Stadium, King's Lynn	Michael Lee	Gordon Kennett	Mike Lanham
5 May	Dudley Wood Stadium, Dudley	Bruce Penhall	Scott Autrey	Steve Bastable
5 May	Hyde Road, Manchester	Doug Wyer	Larry Ross	Bobby Beaton
8 May	Leicester Stadium, Leicester	Michael Lee	John Titman	Ila Teromaa
10 May	Foxhall Stadium, Ipswich	Steve Bastable	John Louis	Andy Grahame

== Second round ==
=== Swedish qualification ===
- Top 5 in each heat to Swedish final

(6 May, Grevby Motorstadion Mariestad)
Pos	Rider	Points
1	Bernt Persson	13
2	Hans Danielsson	12
3	Bengt Jansson	11+3
4	Uno Johansson	11+2
5	Lars-Åke Andersson	11+1
6	Christer Sjösten	10
7	Lennart Bengtsson	9
8	Karl-Erik Claesson	8
9	Tomas Pettersson	8
10	Hasse Holmqvist	8
11	Kenneth Selmosson	7
12	Kjell Bergström	4
13	Thomas Hydling	3
14	Lars-Ove Lundgren	3
15	Stefan Hjort	2
16	Lars-Olof Karlsson	0
17	Ragnar Holm (res)	0

(6 May, Motala Arena Motala)
Pos	Rider	Points
1	Jan Andersson	15
2	Stefan Salmonsson	14
3	Sören Sjösten	12
4	Gert Carlsson	10
5	Kent Eriksson	9+3
6	Jan Johansson	9+ 2
7	Lillebror Johansson	8
8	Göran Waltersson	7
9	Conny Samuelsson	7
10	Åke Axelsson 6	6
11	Alf Trofast	6
12	Peter Johansson	5
13	Tommy Karlsson	5
14	Tord Löwdin	4
15	Lars Hedlund (res)	2
16	Jan Davidsson	1
17	Olle Nygren	0

(6 May, Målilla (Motorbana) Målilla)
Pos	Rider	Points
1	Bo Wirebrand	15
2	Tommy Nilsson	14
3	Tommy Johansson	11
4	Åke Fridell	11
5	Richard Hellsén	10+3
6	Per-Ove Gudmundsson	10+2
7	Rolf Sundberg	9
8	Sören Karlsson	8
9	Ingemar Andersson	7
10	Nils Eriksson	6
11	Tommy Steen	6
12	Börje Klingberg	5
13	Bengt Gustavsson	3
14	Torgil Roth	2
15	Sölve Larsson	1
16	Leif Johansson (res)	1
17	Bertil Andersson	1
18	Björn Persson (res)	1

=== Continental Preliminary round ===
- Riders progress to Continental quarter-finals

Date	Venue	Winner	2nd	3rd
22 April	(Czechoslovakia) Speedway Žarnovica, Žarnovica	(Czechoslovakia) Jiří Štancl	(Czechoslovakia) Petr Kučera	(Czechoslovakia) Jiří Jirout
22 April	(Austria) Stadion Wiener Neustadt	(Hungary) Laszlo Meszaroš	(Czechoslovakia) Ladislav Hrádecký	(West Germany) Karl Maier
22 April	(Italy) Giavera del Montello, Treviso	(West Germany) Waldemar Bacik	(Czechoslovakia) Jan Hadek	(Bulgaria) Nikolaj Manev
22 April	(West Germany) Rhein-Main Arena, Diedenbergen	(Netherlands) Henny Kroeze	(West Germany) Andrew Curworth	(Austria) Walter Grubmuller

=== British semi-finals ===
- 22 May
- (England) Leicester Stadium, Leicester
- Top 8 to British final

Pos.	Rider	Points
1	Peter Collins	14
2	Gordon Kennett	14
3	Doug Wyer	13
4	Michael Lee	12
5	Alan Molyneux	10
6	Steve Bastable	9
7	Jim McMillan	8
8	Mike Lanham	7
9	Alan Grahame	7
10	IanCartwright	6
11	Vic Harding	6
12	Joe Owen	5
13	Nicky Allott	4
14	Tom Owen	4
15	Kenny Carter	2
16	Bobby Beaton	0

- 23 May
- (England) Wimborne Road, Poole
- Top 8 to British final

Pos.	Rider	Points
1	Dave Morton	14
2	Dave Jessup	13
3	John Louis	11
4	John Davis	10
5	Chris Morton	10
6	Reg Wilson	10
7	Malcolm Simmons	9
8	Roger Johns	9
9	Ian Turner	9
10	Craig Pendlebury	6
11	Colin Richardson	5
12	Bruce Cribb	4
13	Kevin Jolly	4
14	Les Collins	3
15	Mick Hines	1
16	Trevor Geer	0

=== New Zealand Final ===
- 21 January 1979
- (New Zealand) Ruapuna Speedway, Christchurch
- First 8 to Australasian Final

Pos.	Rider	Heat Scores	Total
1	Larry Ross	3,3,3,3,3	15
2	Mitch Shirra	3,3,2,2,2	12
3	Ivan Mauger	2,3,E,3,3	11
4	Roger Wright	2,0,3,3,3	11
5	John Goodall	1,3,3,1,2	10
6	David Bargh	3,0,1,3,2	9
7	Tony Briggs	1,2,1,2,3	9
8	Graeme Stapleton	2,2,2,1,2	9
9	Mike Fullerton	3,1,3,0,1	8
10	James Moore	1,2,0,2,1	6
11	Colin Tucker	0,2,1,2,0	5
12	Patrick Pawson	0,1,2,1,0	4
13	Robin Adlington	0,1,2,0,1	4
14	Max Brown	1,1,0,0,0	2
15	John Brown	0,0,0,0,1	1
16	William Aulsford	ns	0
R1	Paul Fewings	2,1,0	3
R2	Gary Forscutt	0,1	1

=== Australian Final ===
- 11 February 1979
- (Australia) Olympic Park, Mildura
- First 8 to Australasian Final

Pos.	Rider	Total
1	Phil Crump	15
2	Danny Kennedy	13
3	John Boulger	11
4	John Titman	10
5	Steve Koppe	10
6	Billy Sanders	10
7	Gary Guglielmi	9
8	Glyn Taylor	9
9	Rob Maxfield	6
10	Phil Bass	5
11	Glen McDonald	5
12	Mike Farrell	4
13	John Langfield	4
14	David Shields	2
15	Ross Townson	2
16	Kym Amundson	2

== Third round ==
=== Continental quarter-finals ===
- Top 32 riders to Continental semi-finals

Date	Venue	Winner	2nd	3rd
6 May	(Hungary) Hajdú Volán Stadion, Debrecen	(Soviet Union) Mikhail Starostin	(Czechoslovakia) Jan Verner	(Hungary) Tibor Danka
6 May	(West Germany) Abensberger Stadion, Abensberg	(Czechoslovakia) Jiří Štancl	(Czechoslovakia) Václav Verner	(Soviet Union) Anatoly Maksimow
7 May	(Socialist Federal Republic of Yugoslavia) City Garden Stadium, Osijek	(Czechoslovakia) Petr Ondrašík	(Soviet Union) Valery Gordeev	(Netherlands) Henny Kroeze
7 May	(Czechoslovakia) Slaný Speedway Stadium, Slaný	(Czechoslovakia) Aleš Dryml Sr.	(Czechoslovakia) Zdeněk Kudrna	(Hungary) Istvan Sziracky

=== American semi-finals ===
- Top 16 to American final (two 32 rider meetings, held in 1978)

Date	Venue	Winner	2nd	3rd
16 September 1978	Santa Ana Stadium, Santa Ana	Denny Pyeatt	Bobby Schwartz	Mike Bloom
22 September 1978	Sacramento, Sacramento	Dennis Robinson	Mike Faria	Duane Yarrow

=== British Final ===
- 20 June 1979
- (England) Brandon Stadium, Coventry
- First 10 to Commonwealth Final plus 1 reserve

Placing	Rider	Total	1	2	3	4	5	6	7	8	9	10	11	12	13	14	15	16	17	18	19	20	Pts	Pos	21
1	(England) (9) Peter Collins	15			3		3						3					3		3			15	1	
2	(England) (8) Michael Lee	14		3						3			2			3			3				14	2	
3	(England) (7) Dave Jessup	12		2					3					2	3					2			12	3	
4	(England) (16) John Davis	11				3				2	3						2			1			11	4	
5	(England) (10) Doug Wyer	10			1			2						3			3		1				10	5	
6	(England) (11) Malcolm Simmons	10			2				2		1					2						3	10	6	
7	(England) (12) Roger Johns	8			F					1		3			1						3		8	7	
8	(England) (1) Gordon Kennett	7	3				E				0				2				2				7	8	
9	(England) (13) Alan Molyneux	7				2	1							1		1					2		7	9	
10	(England) (2) John Louis	6	2					3				1				0				0			6	10	3
11	(England) (6) Chris Morton	6		0				1			2							2			1		6	11	2
12	(England) (5) Reg Wilson	6		1			2					0					1					2	6	12	
13	(Scotland) (15) Jim McMillan	4				0			1			2						1	0				4	13	
14	(England) (14) Alan Grahame	3				1		0					1		0							1	3	14	
15	(England) (4) Mike Lanham	1	1							0				0				0				0	1	15	
16	(England) (3) Ian Turner	0	E						0				0				0				0		0	16	
R1	(England) (R1) Craig Pendlebury	0																					0	R1	
R2	(England) (R2) Ian Cartwright	0																					0	R2	
Placing	Rider	Total	1	2	3	4	5	6	7	8	9	10	11	12	13	14	15	16	17	18	19	20	Pts	Pos	21

m - exclusion for exceeding two minute time allowance • t - exclusion for touching the tapes • x - other exclusion • e - retired or mechanical failure • f - fell • ns - non-starter • nc - non-classify

gate A - inside	gate B	gate C	gate D - outside

=== Australasian Final ===
- 23 February 1979
- (Australia) Rowley Park Speedway, Adelaide
- Referee: (Australia) Sam Bass
- First 6 to Commonwealth final plus 1 reserve

Pos.	Rider	Total
1	(Australia) Billy Sanders	13
2	(Australia) Steve Koppe	12
3	(Australia) John Titman	11+3
4	(Australia) Phil Crump	11+2
5	(New Zealand) Ivan Mauger	11+1
6	(New Zealand) Larry Ross	10+3
7	(New Zealand) Mitch Shirra	10+2
8	(Australia) Gary Guglielmi	8
9	(New Zealand) John Goodall	8
10	(Australia) Danny Kennedy	6
11	(Australia) John Boulger	6
12	(Australia) Glyn Taylor	6
13	(New Zealand) Tony Briggs (Res)	4
14	(New Zealand) Graeme Stapleton	2
15	(New Zealand) David Bargh (Res)	2
16	(New Zealand) Roger Wright	0

=== Danish Final ===
- 6 May 1979
- (Denmark) Fjelsted Speedway Stadium, Harndrup
- First 4 to Nordic Final (Ole Olsen seeded to Nordic final)

Placing	Rider	Total	1	2	3	4	5	6	7	8	9	10	11	12	13	14	15	16	17	18	19	20	Pts	Pos	21
1	(Denmark) (5) Bo Petersen	14		3			2					3					3					3	14	1	3
2	(Denmark) (12) Finn Thomsen	14			3					3		2			3						3		14	2	2
3	(Denmark) (6) Mike Lohmann	12		2				2			3							3			2		12	3	3
4	(Denmark) (1) Hans Nielsen	12	3				3				2				1				3				12	4	2
5	(Denmark) (14) Finn Rune Jensen	11				3		3					3		0							2	11	5	
6	(Denmark) (7) Bent Rasmussen	10		F					2					3	2					3			10	6	
7	(Denmark) (15) Jens Henry Nielsen	10				2			3			1						2	2				10	7	
8	(Denmark) (10) Steen Mastrup	8			2			1						2			2		1				8	8	
9	(Denmark) (3) Helge Hansen	5	2						1				1				1				0		5	9	
10	(Denmark) (13) Svend Lund	5				0	1							E		3					1		5	10	
11	(Denmark) (4) Gunnar Svendsen	5	1							1				1				1				1	5	11	
12	(Denmark) (2) Finn Londal Jensen	4	0					0				0				2				2			4	12	
13	(Denmark) (16) Alf Busk	4				1				2	1						F			-			4	13	
14	(Denmark) (8) Kai Kristiansen	3		1						0			2			F			-				3	14	
15	(Denmark) (9) Kristian Præstbro	1			1		E						-					-		-			1	15	
16	(Denmark) (11) Ernst Bogh	0																					0	16	
Placing	Rider	Total	1	2	3	4	5	6	7	8	9	10	11	12	13	14	15	16	17	18	19	20	Pts	Pos	21

m - exclusion for exceeding two minute time allowance • t - exclusion for touching the tapes • x - other exclusion • e - retired or mechanical failure • f - fell • ns - non-starter • nc - non-classify

gate A - inside	gate B	gate C	gate D - outside

=== Norwegian Final ===
- To 3 riders to Nordic Final
- (Norway) Elgane, Varhaug

Pos.	Rider	Total
1	Reidar Eide	14
2	Rolf Gramstad	13
3	Audun Ove Olsen	11
4	Sigvart Pedersen	10
5	Tom Godal	10
6	Thoralf Holen	10
7	Tormod Langli	9
8	Edgar Stangeland	9
9	Trond Helge Skretting	8
10	Per Arne Hansen	6

=== Finland Final ===
- 3 selected riders to Nordic Final
- 13 August '78
- (Finland) Kärpänen Speedway, Lahti

Pos.	Rider	Total
1	Kai Niemi	12+3
2	Rauli Mäkinen	12+2
3	Martti Väyrynen	10
4	Veijo Tuoriniemi	10
5	Ari Koponen	10
6	Timo Kiansten	9
7	Esko Mylläri	8
8	Olli Turkia	7
9	Seppo Palomäki	7
10	Keijo Mylläri	6
11	Pekka Hautamäki	6
12	Ari Turkia	5
13	Ilkka Teromaa	5
14	Esa Mattila (res)	4
15	Pentti Mattila	3
16	Veikko Haapamäki	3
17	Pekka Paljakka	2
18	Jarmo Puttonen (res)	0

=== Swedish Final ===
- 29 May 1979
- (Sweden) Kumla Motorstadion, Kumla
- First 5 to Nordic Final + 1 reserve

Pos.	Rider	Total
1	Jan Andersson	15
2	Anders Michanek	12
3	Bernt Persson	11
4	Richard Hellsen	11
5	Ake Fridell	11
6	Lars-Åke Andersson	10
7	Bo Wirebrand	9
8	Uno Johansson	8
9	Stefan Salmonsson	7
10	Bengt Jansson	5
11	Hans Danielsson	5
12	Sören Sjösten	4
13	Tommy Nilsson	3
14	Lennart Bengsson (res)	3
15	Gert Carlsson	2
16	Kent Eriksson	1
17	Sören Karlsson	0

== Fourth round ==
=== Continental semi-finals ===
- 27 May
- (Italy) Santa Marina Stadium, Lonigo
- Top 8 to Continental final

Pos.	Rider	Points
1	(Czechoslovakia) Aleš Dryml Sr.	13
2	(Soviet Union) Viktor Kuznetsov	11
3	(Czechoslovakia) Jiří Štancl	11
4	(West Germany) Georg Hack	10
5	(Czechoslovakia) Jan Hadek	10
6	(Czechoslovakia) Petr Kucera	9
7	(Soviet Union) Anatolij Maximov	9
8	(Czechoslovakia) Václav Verner	9
9	(Czechoslovakia) Zdenek Kudrna	8
10	(Hungary) Istvan Sziraczki	6
11	(Italy) Giuseppe Marzotto	5
12	(Soviet Union) Vladimir Klytchov	5
13	(West Germany) Waldemar Bacik	4
14	(Czechoslovakia) Milan Špinka	2
15	(Austria) Herbert Szerecz	0
16	(Germany) Peter Lempenhauer	0

- 27 May
- (West Germany) Breitenthal Stadium, Krumbach
- Top 8 to Continental final

Pos.	Rider	Points
1	(Czechoslovakia) Jan Verner	15
2	(Netherlands) Henny Kroeze	14
3	(Soviet Union) Valerij Gordeev	12
4	(Czechoslovakia) Petr Ondrašík	11
5	(Hungary) Laszlo Meszaros	10
6	(Soviet Union) Michail Starostin	10
7	(West Germany) Christoph Betzl	9
8	(West Germany) Alois Wiesböck	9
9	(West Germany) Karl Maier	8
10	(Hungary) Janos Szöke	6
11	(Soviet Union) Vladimir Paznikov	5
12	(Netherlands) Henk Steman	4
13	(Soviet Union) Alexander Khaljavin	3
14	(England) Andy Cusworth	2
15	(West Germany) George Gilgenreiner	2
16	(Hungary) Tibor Danka	0

=== American Final ===
- 29 December 1978
- (United States) Santa Ana Stadium, Santa Ana
- First 2 to Intercontinental final plus 1 reserve

Pos.	Rider	Total
1	Bobby Schwartz	12+3
2	Mike Bast	12+2
3	Kelly Moran	12+1
4	Steve Gresham	12+0
5	Mike Faria	10
6	Steve McConnell	9
7	Bruce Penhall	8
8	Bill Cody	7
9	Rich McMurray	7
10	John Cook	6
11	Gary Hutchinson	6
12	Dennis Robinson	5
13	Duane Yarrow	5
14	Dave Faria	4
15	Denny Pyeatt	3
16	Mike Bloom	2

=== Commonwealth Final ===
- 1 July 1979
- (England) White City Stadium, London
- First 9 to Intercontinental final plus 1 reserve

Placing	Rider	Total	1	2	3	4	5	6	7	8	9	10	11	12	13	14	15	16	17	18	19	20	Pts	Pos	21
1	(England) (16) Michael Lee	14				3				3	2						3			3			14	1	3
2	(Australia) (11) Billy Sanders	14			3				3		3					2						3	14	2	2
3	(England) (13) Dave Jessup	12				2	2							2		3					3		12	3	
4	(New Zealand) (15) Larry Ross	11				1			2			3						3	2				11	4	
5	(New Zealand) (5) Ivan Mauger	11		3			3					2					1					2	11	5	
6	(England) (10) Peter Collins	10			2			2						3			2		1				10	6	
7	(Australia) (8) John Titman	9		2						1			2			1			3				9	7	
8	(England) (6) Gordon Kennett	8		F				3			1							2			2		8	8	
9	(England) (9) John Davis	7			1		1						3					F		2			7	9	
10	(England) (14) Malcolm Simmons	6				0		1					1		3							1	6	10	
11	(England) (4) Doug Wyer	5	3							2				F				-				-	5	11	
12	(England) (7) John Louis	4		1					0					1	2					F			4	12	
13	(Australia) (1) Phil Crump	2	2				0				-				-				-				2	13	
14	(England) (3) Roger Johns	2	1						1				E				0				-		2	14	
15	(Australia) (12) Steve Koppe	2			0					0		1			1						0		2	15	
16	(England) (2) Alan Molyneux	1	E					E				0				E				1			1	16	
R1	(Australia) (R1) Sean Willmott	0									0												0	R1	
R2	(England) (R2) Chris Morton	1																1				0	1	R2	
R3	(New Zealand) (R3) Mitch Shirra	1													0				0		1		1	R3	
Placing	Rider	Total	1	2	3	4	5	6	7	8	9	10	11	12	13	14	15	16	17	18	19	20	Pts	Pos	21

m - exclusion for exceeding two minute time allowance • t - exclusion for touching the tapes • x - other exclusion • e - retired or mechanical failure • f - fell • ns - non-starter • nc - non-classify

gate A - inside	gate B	gate C	gate D - outside

=== Nordic Final ===
- 5 June 1979
- (Sweden) Norrköping Motorstadion, Norrköping
- First 5 to Intercontinental final plus 1 reserve

Placing	Rider	Total	1	2	3	4	5	6	7	8	9	10	11	12	13	14	15	16	17	18	19	20	Pts	Pos	21
1	(Sweden) (1) Jan Andersson	13	3				2				3				3				2				13	1	3
2	(Denmark) (13) Hans Nielsen	13				2	3							3		3					2		13	2	2
3	(Denmark) (8) Finn Thomsen	12		3						3			3			2			1				12	3	3
4	(Denmark) (10) Ole Olsen	12			3			3						2			1		3				12	4	2
5	(Finland) (3) Kai Niemi	9	0						3				0				3				3		9	5	3
6	(Finland) (5) Ila Teromaa	9		2			1					3					0					3	9	6	2
7	(Denmark) (16) Bo Petersen	8				3				0	X						2			3			8	7	
8	(Sweden) (6) Bernt Persson	8		1				1			2							3			1		8	8	
9	(Sweden) (4) Anders Michanek	7	1							2				1				2				1	7	9	
10	(Denmark) (14) Mike Lohmann	6				X		2					2		2							E	6	10	
11	(Norway) (2) Reidar Eide	6	2					0				1				1				2			6	11	
12	(Norway) (11) Rolf Gramstad	5			0				2		1					F						2	5	12	
13	(Sweden) (15) Ake Fridell	4				1			0			2						1	0				4	13	
14	(Sweden) (9) Richard Hellsen	3			2		0						1					-		-			3	14	
15	(Finland) (7) Olli Turkia	2		0					1					0	1					F			2	15	
16	(Norway) (12) Audun Ove Olsen	2			1					1		0			0						0		2	16	
R1	(Sweden) (R1) Lars-Åke Andersson	1																		1			1	R1	
R2	(Sweden) (R2) Sören Karlsson	0															0						0	R2	
Placing	Rider	Total	1	2	3	4	5	6	7	8	9	10	11	12	13	14	15	16	17	18	19	20	Pts	Pos	21

m - exclusion for exceeding two minute time allowance • t - exclusion for touching the tapes • x - other exclusion • e - retired or mechanical failure • f - fell • ns - non-starter • nc - non-classify

gate A - inside	gate B	gate C	gate D - outside

== Fifth round ==
=== Continental Final ===
- 8 July 1979
- (West Germany) Rottalstadion, Pocking
- First 4 to World final plus 1 reserve
- Polish riders Zenon Plech, Edward Jancarz and Robert Słaboń seeded to World Final

Placing	Rider	Total	1	2	3	4	5	6	7	8	9	10	11	12	13	14	15	16	17	18	19	20	Pts	Pos	21
1	(West Germany) (9) Christoph Betzl	14			3		3						3					3		2			14	1	
2	(Soviet Union) (3) Mikhail Starostin	13	3						3				1				3				3		13	2	
3	(Czechoslovakia) (5) Zdeněk Kudrna	12		3			1					3					2					3	12	3	3
4	(West Germany) (14) Alois Wiesböck	12				3		3					2		3							1	12	4	2
5	(Czechoslovakia) (13) Petr Ondrašík	11				1	2							3		3					2		11	5	
6	(Soviet Union) (16) Valery Gordeev	10				2				1	3						1			3			10	6	
7	(Czechoslovakia) (11) Václav Verner	9			2				1		2					2						2	9	7	
8	(Czechoslovakia) (10) Jiří Štancl	7			1			1						2			0		3				7	8	
9	(Soviet Union) (12) Viktor Kuznetsov	7			0					2		2			2						1		7	9	
10	(Soviet Union) (15) Anatoly Maksimov	6				X			2			0						2	2				6	10	
11	(West Germany) (2) Karl Maier	6	2					2				1				X				1			6	11	
12	(West Germany) (4) Georg Hack	4	1							3				X				-				X	4	12	
13	(Czechoslovakia) (7) Jan Hadek	4		2					0					1	1					X			4	13	
14	(Hungary) (1) László Mészáros	2	X				0				1				0				1				2	14	
15	(Czechoslovakia) (8) Jan Verner	0		X						X			X			X			X				0	15	
16	(Czechoslovakia) (6) Aleš Dryml Sr.	0		X				-			-							-			-		0	16	
R1	(Hungary) (R1) Janosz Szoke	1						0			0							1			0		1	R1	
Placing	Rider	Total	1	2	3	4	5	6	7	8	9	10	11	12	13	14	15	16	17	18	19	20	Pts	Pos	21

m - exclusion for exceeding two minute time allowance • t - exclusion for touching the tapes • x - other exclusion • e - retired or mechanical failure • f - fell • ns - non-starter • nc - non-classify

gate A - inside	gate B	gate C	gate D - outside

=== Intercontinental Final ===
- 8 August 1979
- (England) White City Stadium, London
- First 9 to World Final plus 1 reserve

Placing	Rider	Total	1	2	3	4	5	6	7	8	9	10	11	12	13	14	15	16	17	18	19	20	Pts	Pos	21
1	(England) (14) Michael Lee	14				3		3					3		2							3	14	1	3
2	(England) (7) Peter Collins	14		3					3					2	3					3			14	2	2
3	(Denmark) (9) Finn Thomsen	10			2		3						1					3		1			10	3	3
4	(New Zealand) (8) Ivan Mauger	10		1						3			2			2			2				10	4	2
5	(England) (13) Dave Jessup	10				2	2							3		3					0		10	5	1
6	(Denmark) (4) Ole Olsen	9	3							1				1				2				2	9	6	
7	(Australia) (2) Billy Sanders	8	2					0				3				1				2			8	7	
8	(United States) (3) Kelly Moran	8	1						2				0				3				2		8	8	
9	(Australia) (10) John Titman	8			1			2						0			2		3				8	9	
10	(New Zealand) (6) Larry Ross	7		0				1			3							0			3		7	10	
11	(Finland) (15) Kai Niemi	6				1			1			2						1	1				6	11	
12	(England) (5) Gordon Kennett	5		2			1					1					1					0	5	12	
13	(England) (12) John Davis	4			3					0		0			0						1		4	13	
14	(Denmark) (16) Hans Nielsen	2				0				2	0						0			0			2	14	
15	(United States) (11) Bobby Schwartz	2			F				0		1					0						1	2	15	
16	(Sweden) (1) Jan Andersson	1	0				0				T				1				0				1	16	
R1	(England) (R1) Malcolm Simmons	2									2												2	R1	
Placing	Rider	Total	1	2	3	4	5	6	7	8	9	10	11	12	13	14	15	16	17	18	19	20	Pts	Pos	21

m - exclusion for exceeding two minute time allowance • t - exclusion for touching the tapes • x - other exclusion • e - retired or mechanical failure • f - fell • ns - non-starter • nc - non-classify

gate A - inside	gate B	gate C	gate D - outside

== World Final ==
- 2 September 1979
- (Poland) Silesian Stadium, Chorzów

Placing	Rider	Total	1	2	3	4	5	6	7	8	9	10	11	12	13	14	15	16	17	18	19	20	Pts	Pos
1	(New Zealand) (15) Ivan Mauger	14				3			3			2						3	3				14	1
2	(Poland) (7) Zenon Plech	13		3					1					3	3					3			13	2
3	(England) (5) Michael Lee	11+3		2			3					3					0					3	11	3
4	(United States) (3) Kelly Moran	11+2	1						2				3				2				3		11	4
5	(Australia) (4) Billy Sanders	11+1	3							3				1				2				2	11	5
6	(Denmark) (10) Ole Olsen	11+0			3			3						2			1		2				11	6
7	(Czech Republic) (11) Zdeněk Kudrna	8			2				0		3					3						0	8	7
8	(England) (16) Dave Jessup	8				E				1	2						3			2			8	8
9	(Poland) (12) Edward Jancarz	7			1					2		1			2						1		7	9
10	(Denmark) (13) Finn Thomsen	6				2	E							0		2					2		6	10
11	(England) (1) Peter Collins	6	2				2				1				1				E				6	11
12	(Australia) (14) John Titman	5				1		2					2		0							1	6	12
13	(Soviet Union) (2) Mikhail Starostin	3	0					1				0				1				1			3	13
14	(Germany) (6) Christoph Betzl	2		1				0			0							1			0		2	14
15	(Poland) (8) Robert Słaboń	2		0						0			1			0			1				2	15
16	(Germany) (9) Alois Wiesböck	1			0		1						0					0		0			1	16
	(Czech Republic) (17) Petr Ondrašík	0																					0	
	(New Zealand) (18) Larry Ross	0																					0	
Placing	Rider	Total	1	2	3	4	5	6	7	8	9	10	11	12	13	14	15	16	17	18	19	20	Pts	Pos

m - exclusion for exceeding two minute time allowance • t - exclusion for touching the tapes • x - other exclusion • e - retired or mechanical failure • f - fell • ns - non-starter • nc - non-classify

gate A - inside	gate B	gate C	gate D - outside
