= 1977 Australasian Individual Speedway Championship =

Seasons
- ← 1976 1978 →

The 1977 Australasian Individual Speedway Championship was the second annual Australasian Final for Motorcycle speedway riders from Australia and New Zealand as part of the qualification for the 1977 Speedway World Championship.

The Final took place at the 509 metres (557 yards) Sydney Showground. Four time World Champion Ivan Mauger was the winner after defeating Phil Crump and defending Australasian Champion John Boulger in a runoff after all three riders finished on 14 points. Billy Sanders finished fourth to get the last qualifying spot in the 1977 Intercontinental Final to be held at the White City Stadium in London, England.

Ivan Mauger would go on to win his record equalling 5th World Championship later in the year at the Ullevi stadium in Gothenburg, Sweden.

== Australasian Final ==
- February 19
- Sydney, Australia - Sydney Showground
- Qualification: First 4 to the Intercontinental Final in London, England

Pos.	Rider	Total
1	(New Zealand) Ivan Mauger	14+3
2	(Australia) Phil Crump	14+2
3	(Australia) John Boulger	14+1
4	(Australia) Billy Sanders	12
5	(Australia) Phil Herne	11
6	(New Zealand) Barry Briggs	9
7	(Australia) Ricky Day	9
8	(New Zealand) Mitch Shirra	8
9	(Australia) Mike Farrell	7
10	(Australia) John Titman	7
11	(New Zealand) Colin Farquharson	4
12	(New Zealand) Larry Ross	4
13	(New Zealand) Robin Adlington	3
14	(New Zealand) Mike Fullerton	3
15	(New Zealand) Roger Wright	1
16	(New Zealand) John Goodall	0

== See also ==
- Sport in Australia
- Motorcycle Speedway
