= 1976 Australasian Individual Speedway Championship =

Motorcycle speedway competition

Seasons
- ← none 1977 →

The 1976 Australasian Individual Speedway Championship was the inaugural Australasian Final, introduced for Motorcycle speedway riders from Australia and New Zealand as part of the qualification for the 1976 Speedway World Championship.

The Final took place at the 413 metres (452 yards) long Western Springs Stadium in Auckland. South Australian Champion John Boulger took out the Final from fellow Australians Billy Sanders and Phil Crump. The then four time World Champion Ivan Mauger finished fourth to grab the final spot in the 1976 Intercontinental Final at London's famous Wembley Stadium.

Mitch Shirra, who before the end of the 1970s would be riding for his native New Zealand (he was born in Auckland), actually rode as an Australian in this meeting complete with the Australian flag on his breast plate. Sixteen-year-old Shirra (who in late 1973 began riding at the age of 14 after lying about his age) was living in Sydney and considered the Liverpool International Speedway to be his home track.

== Australasian Final ==
- 21 February
- Auckland, New Zealand - Western Springs Stadium
- Referee:
- Qualification: First 4 to the Intercontinental Final in London, England

Pos.	Rider	Total
1	(Australia) John Boulger	14
2	(Australia) Billy Sanders	13
3	(Australia) Phil Crump	12
4	(New Zealand) Ivan Mauger	11+3
5	(Australia) Phil Herne	11+2
6	(Australia) Mitch Shirra	11+1
7	(New Zealand) Barry Briggs	8
8	(Australia) John Titman	8
9	(Australia) Ricky Day	6
10	(New Zealand) Colin Tucker	5
11	(Australia) John Langfield	4
12	(New Zealand) Larry Ross	4
13	(New Zealand) Colin Farquharson	4
14	(New Zealand) Graeme Stapleton	3
15	(New Zealand) Roy Trigg	2
16	(New Zealand) Paul Fewings	2
17	(New Zealand) D. Sincock (Res)	1
18	(New Zealand) Robin Adlington (Res)	1

== See also ==
- Sport in New Zealand
- Motorcycle Speedway
