= Neil Middleditch =

British motorcycle speedway rider

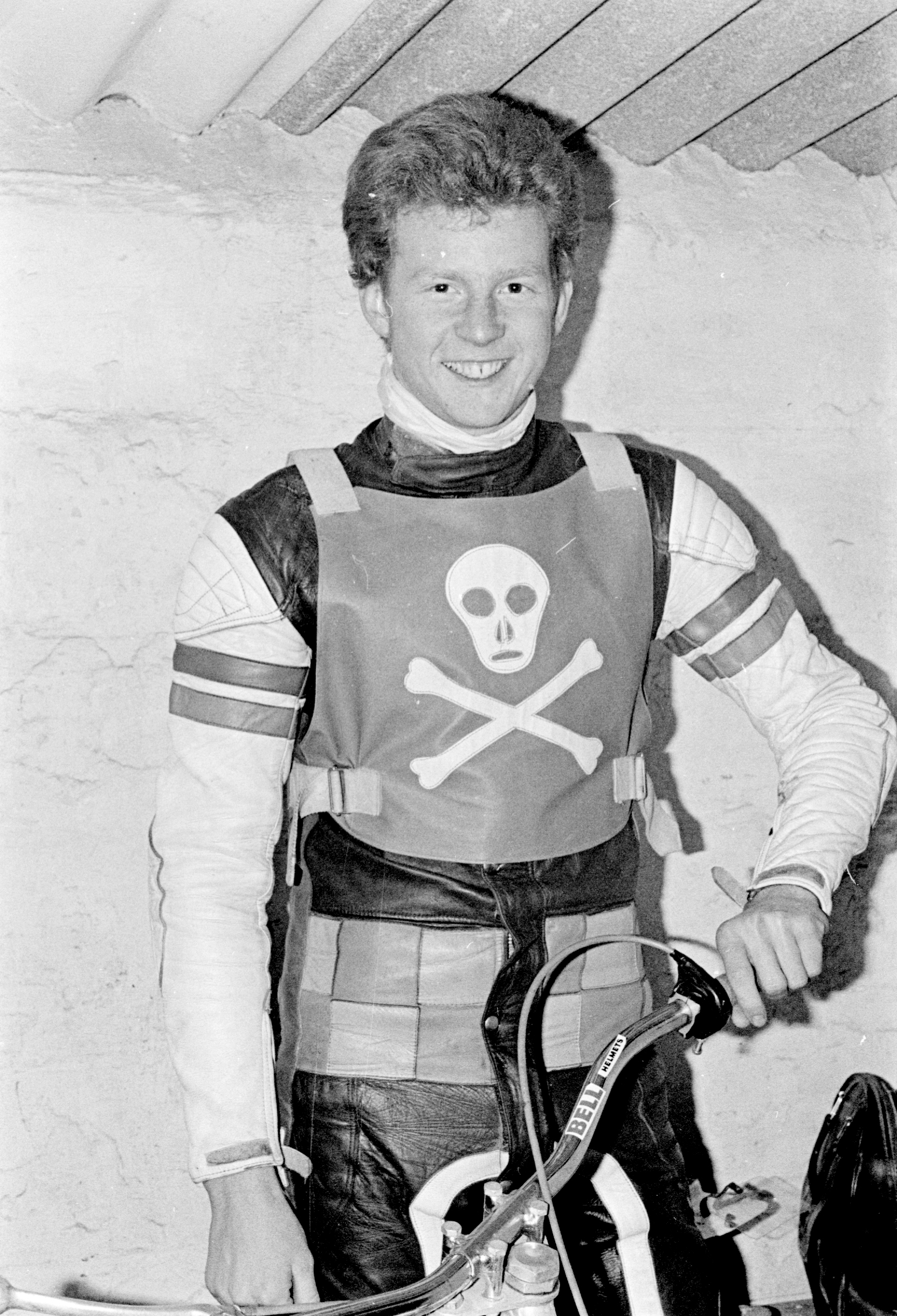
- Born: 7 January 1957 (age 69); Wimborne, England
- Nationality: British (English)

Career history
- 1973–1975: Eastbourne Eagles
- 1973: Coatbridge Tigers
- 1973, 1974: Exeter Falcons
- 1974: Wolverhampton Wolves
- 1974: Oxford Rebels
- 1974–1984: Poole Pirates
- 1985–1986: Reading Racers
- 1985–1986: Arena Essex Hammers

Individual honours
- 1975: British Under-21 Champion
- 1985: National League Riders Champion

Team honours
- 1975: New National League KO Cup Winner

Neil Middleditch (born 7 January 1957 in Wimborne, Dorset) is a former motorcycle speedway rider, who rode for England and was the team manager of Great Britain. He earned seven international caps for the England national speedway team and was the team manager of the Great Britain national speedway team from 2001 to 2008, a position he resumed from 2011 until 2013.

== Riding career ==
Middleditch grew up around speedway because his father Ken Middleditch was a former rider with the Poole Pirates. Neil Middleditch's riding career spanned from 1973 until 1986, riding for the Eastbourne Eagles, Poole Pirates, Reading Racers and the Arena Essex Hammers. In 1975 Middleditch became British Under-21 Champion and was third in the 1978 European Under-21 Championship final.

Middleditch won the National League Riders' Championship at Brandon Stadium, held on 10 August 1985.

== Management career ==
=== Poole Pirates ===
Middleditch became the Poole Pirates team manager in 1999 and by the end of the 2024 season he had steered the club to a total of 11 league titles, eight of which were in the top flight of British Speedway (2003-2004, 2008, 2011, 2013-2015 and 2018) and claimed back-to-back Championship (second tier) titles in 2021 and 2022, regaining it in 2024. 'Middlos' impressive trophy haul has been augmented by silverware successes in the Craven Shield in both 2001 and 2002 and again in 2006, and winning the Elite Shield in 2012, 2014-2017 and 2018 in the rebranded Charity Shield. He has Knockout cup victories in 2003-2004, 2010-2012, 2021-2022 (the first five in British speedway's top flight, the latter two at Championship level) and 2024, and also a British League cup title from 2003. He has steered the Pirates to three successive third competition team trophies, the first in 2022 labelled the Jubilee Cup was never completed against Leicester Lions, and was rebranded the BSN Series in 2023, with the Pirates crowned champions that year, a trophy they successfully defended in '24 to take Middlo's winners trophy count to a 31 in 25 active season's (as the 2020 campaign was cancelled due to COVID-19 restrictions)

=== Great Britain ===
Middleditch was appointed as team manager of Great Britain team in 2001 after the resignations of joint managers Colin Pratt and Eric Boocock. In 2004, Great Britain lost out on the World Cup by a single point with Middleditch at the helm. During the BSPA's 2007 annual general meeting, Middleditch announced that he wanted to continue as the Great Britain manager but recommended that 1992 world champion Gary Havelock should be his successor once he has retired from racing. In February 2008, Middleditch quit his role as the Great Britain manager after seven years in charge to focus on his family business. He later returned to the role from 2011 until 2013.
