= Mick McKeon (speedway rider) =

Australian speedway rider

- Born: 4 March 1954 (age 72); Perth, Australia
- Nationality: Australian

Career history
- 1975–1977: Coatbridge/Glasgow Tigers
- 1975: Ellesmere Port Gunners
- 1977–1980: Halifax Dukes

Individual honours
- 1978: Australasian Championship silver medal
- 1977, 1978, 1979, 1981, 1985, 1986: Western Australian champion

Team honours
- 1980: Northern Trophy

Michael John McKeon (born 4 March 1954) is an Australian former motorcycle speedway rider.

== Career ==
McKeon made his British leagues debut during the 1975 New National League season, where he rode for Coatbridge Tigers and Ellesmere Port Gunners. He continued to ride for Coatbridge during the 1976 and 1977 seasons, improving his average to 7.95.

It was also in 1977 that McKeon won the first of his six Western Australian titles and he was signed by Halifax Dukes for the 1977 British League season.

In 1978, McKeon represented the Australia national speedway team during the 1978 Speedway World Team Cup and won the silver medal at the 1978 Australasian Individual Speedway Championship. He rode again for Australia in the 1980 Speedway World Team Cup and would ride for Australia eleven times in total.

McKeon suffered a serious crash at Belle Vue Stadium, which left him with a fractured skull, leg and ribs. Although he did ride again, the injury ultimately led to him quitting British speedway. He retired in 1987.
