= John Boulger =

Australian speedway rider

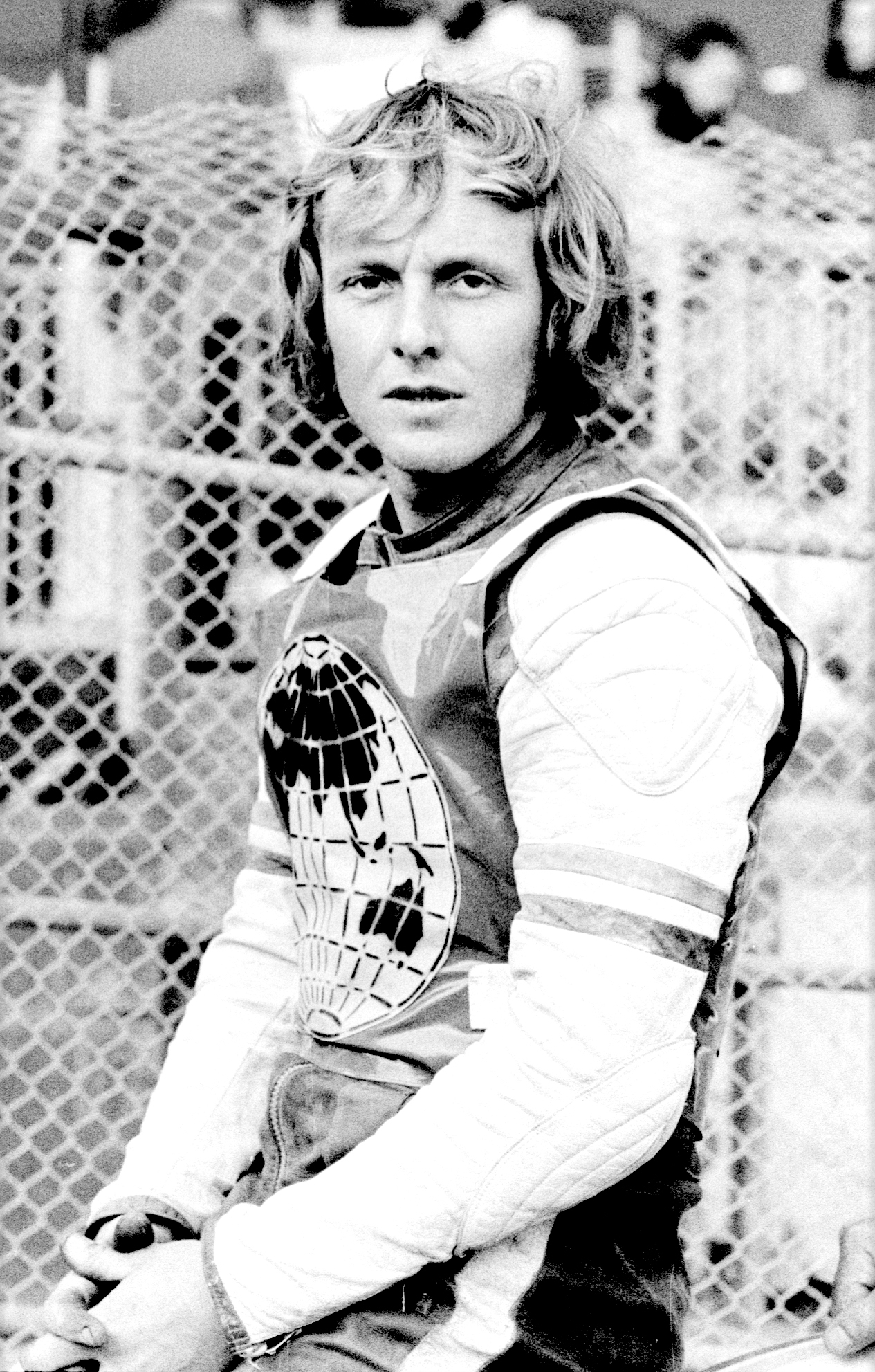
- Born: 18 June 1945 (age 81); Adelaide, South Australia
- Nickname: JB
- Nationality: Australian

Career history
- 1967: Long Eaton Archers
- 1968-1973, 1977-1979: Leicester Lions
- 1974-1976: Cradley United

Individual honours
- 1970, 1972, 1973, 1974, 1975, 1976, 1977, 1978, 1982: South Australian Champion
- 1971, 1973: Australian Champion
- 1973: Midland Riders' Champion
- 1974: Golden Gauntlets
- 1976: Australasian Champion
- 1982: Australian Long Track Champion

Team honours
- 1976: World Team Cup
- 1972: Midland Cup

John Boulger (born 18 June 1945 in Adelaide, South Australia) is a former international motorcycle speedway rider. Boulger won a record nine South Australian Championships (a record jointly held with Jack Young), as well as two Australian Solo Championships during his career. As part of the Australian team, Boulger won the 1976 World Team Cup as captain.

== Career summary ==
=== Australia ===
Boulger, whose father was a mechanic for international solo star Merv Harding, started his racing career in 1965 racing scrambles as a sidecar passenger with friend Brenton Hanks (which only lasted a year) before moving into speedway. His first race was at the Broken Hill Speedway in October 1966 where he lost an oil tank and seized the engine in his first meeting. He then got his break when he tagged along with leading Adelaide sidecar rider Len Bowes to the Northern Park Raceway in Melbourne. As a favour to Bowes, the promoter let Boulger ride just expecting him to make up the numbers, but everyone received a shock when Boulger broke the track record in his first ride.

Boulger's home track was the famed, 358 metres (392 yd) Rowley Park Speedway in Adelaide and he made his debut there on 29 October 1966. He quickly went from promising rookie to star rider within a couple of seasons.

After finishing second to Sydney's Jim Airey at the 509 metres (557 yd) Sydney Showground in 1970, Boulger won his first Australian Solo Championship in 1971 at Perth's ⅓ mile (586 metres (641 yd)) Claremont Speedway after a bold passing move on local favourite Chum Taylor in the last corner of the deciding heat to give him a 15-point maximum. He finished in third place at Rowley Park in 1972 behind Airey and Denmark's reigning World Champion Ole Olsen, and won his last title in 1973 at the Sydney Showground with a 15-point maximum, leaving defending champion and "King of the Royale" Airey languishing in fourth place. Boulger then finished the 1974 championship at the 425 metres (465 yd) Brisbane Exhibition Ground in second place behind local rider Steve Reinke to cap a four-year run where he never finished the Australian title off the podium. He would place once more finishing third in 1979 at the 302 metres (330 yd) Olympic Park Speedway in Mildura behind local favourites Phil Crump and Danny Kennedy.

During the 1970s, Boulger had a virtual stranglehold on the South Australian Solo Championship. He won his first title in 1970 before winning a record seven in a row between 1972 and 1978, all held at Rowley Park Speedway. He would win his ninth and last SA Championship at the new Speedway Park in 1982. Boulger's ninth SA title saw him equal the record of nine wins by Jack Young. As of 2016, this record still stands, with the next best record being five wins by Queenslander Troy Batchelor. Boulger narrowly missed equaling Young's record in 1981 when he finished second in the championship behind Tony Boyle at Speedway Park. Boulger was undefeated in his first three rides, and was leading his fourth race when his front forks broke forcing him to crash and not finish the race.

Boulger won the inaugural Australasian Championship at the Western Springs Stadium in Auckland, New Zealand in 1976 defeating Billy Sanders, Phil Crump and multiple World Champion Ivan Mauger (the Australasian Final was introduced as a World Championship qualifying round for Australian and New Zealand riders). He then went on to finish in a 3-way tie for first place in 1977 at the Sydney Showground with Mauger and Crump, before eventually finishing third after a runoff. Later in 1982 he won the Australian Long Track Championship in the South Australian town of Morgan in 1982.

Boulger retired from riding in 1984 and decided to stay in speedway, first by teaching young riders the art of racing a Solo motorbike, with many of his protégé's racing at the Sidewinders Junior Speedway in Adelaide which opened in 1978. Boulger has been a long time supporter of Sidewinders and during the early-mid 1980s was a mentor to a number of younger riders including Steve Baker, Mark Fiora, Shane Parker, Craig Hodgson and Shane Bowes, the son of Boulger's long time friend and the 1968 Australian Sidecar Champion Len Bowes.

In 1985, Boulger started racing Sprintcars before moving on to drive Speedcars with some success, including winning the prestigious "Harry Neale Memorial" at Speedway Park in 1987. Boulger would race for a few more seasons before retiring from the sport in the mid-1990s to concentrate on driving his taxi. After he retired from riding Solos in the early 1980s, Boulger raced somewhat successfully in Speedcars (Midgets) from the mid-1980s until the mid-1990s.

In 2011, Boulger was inducted into the Australian Speedway Hall of Fame and on 29 November 2014, Boulger was inducted into the Motorcycling South Australia Hall of Fame.

=== England ===
Boulger arrived in England in 1967 to ride for the Long Eaton Archers, scoring a paid 12 point maximum in just his third match. He was recommended to the Long Eaton management by British star Ray Wilson who had been on the lookout for Australian talent when he rode in Adelaide in 1967 and picked Boulger as a future star. Boulger appeared in 33 league matches during 1967 for Long Eaton, finishing with a 5.95 points average. In 1968, Long Eaton management moved the team to Leicester, where they would become the Leicester Lions and Boulger remained for six seasons, helping the Lions to second place in the 1971 British Speedway League and gradually improving his average to 9.46 by 1972. In 1973, he replaced Wilson as captain of the Lions and averaged 10.25 points to place 7th in the Riders' Championship. In 1974, Boulger moved to ride for Cradley United where he remained until 1976 before returning to Leicester in 1977. He would remain with the Lions until 1979 when he retired from British League racing in order to spend more time with his family and on his business interests in Adelaide.

=== International ===
Boulger captained the victorious Australian team at the 1976 Speedway World Team Cup held at London's White City Stadium. He also partnered Phil Crump in the 1974 World Pairs final at Hyde Road in Manchester, finishing in second place behind the Swedish pairing of Anders Michanek, and Sören Sjösten. Boulger and Crump finished fifth in the 1975 World Pairs final at the Olympic Stadium in Wrocław, Poland.

Boulger also qualified for two World Final's during his career. He finished 13th with six points in 1973 at the Silesian Stadium in Chorzów, Poland, in front of the largest speedway attendance in history, an estimated 130,000. Boulger also rode in the 1977 World Final at the Ullevi Stadium in Gothenburg, Sweden, where on a wet track he finished 12th with five points from his five rides.

== World Final Appearances ==
=== Individual World Championship ===
- 1973 – (Poland) Chorzów, Silesian Stadium – 13th – 6pts
- 1977 – (Sweden) Gothenburg, Ullevi – 12th – 5pts

=== World Pairs Championship ===
- 1974 - (England) Manchester, Hyde Road (with Phil Crump) - 2nd - 23pts (9)
- 1975 - (Poland) Wrocław, Olympic Stadium (with Phil Crump) - 5th - 19pts (9)

=== World Team Cup ===
- 1976 - (England) London, White City Stadium (with Phil Crump / Phil Herne / Billy Sanders / Garry Middleton) - Winner - 31pts (6)
