= Wayne Brown (speedway rider) =

New Zealand speedway rider

- Born: 2 December 1959; Wellington, New Zealand
- Died: 29 January 1991 (aged 31)
- Nationality: New Zealander

Career history
- 1976–1981: Berwick Bandits
- 1979–1980: Wolverhampton Wolves
- 1981–1982: Sheffield Tigers

Individual honours
- 1980: National League Riders' Champion
- 1981: Scottish Open Champion

Wayne Michael Brown (1959–1991) was a speedway rider from New Zealand. He earned three caps for the New Zealand national speedway team.

== Speedway career ==
Brown rode in the top two tiers of British Speedway from 1976 to 1982, riding for various clubs.

In 1980, Brown became the National League Riders' Champion, which was held at Wimbledon Stadium on 28 September 1980.

On 29 January 1991, Brown died in an industrial accident in his native New Zealand.
