= Steve Koppe =

Australian speedway rider

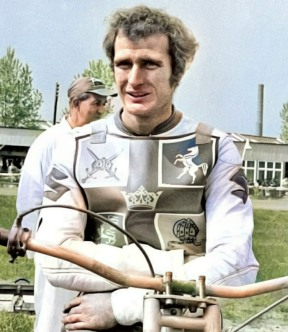
- Born: 16 April 1953 (age 73); Bowen, Queensland, Australia
- Nationality: Australian

Career history
- 1976–1978: Canterbury Crusaders
- 1976–1979: Exeter Falcons
- 1980: Swindon Robins

Individual honours
- 1978: National League Riders' Champion
- 1977, 1982: Queensland State Champion

Team honours
- 1978: National League Champion
- 1978: Spring Gold Cup Winner

Stephen Philip Koppe (born 16 April 1953) is an Australian former speedway rider.

== Speedway career ==
After joining Canterbury Crusaders for the 1976 season, Koppe rode in the top two tiers of British Speedway from 1976 to 1980, riding for various clubs.

In 1978, Koppe became the National League Riders' Champion, held at Wimbledon Stadium on 23 September.

In 1981, Koppe became the Queensland Champion.

== After Speedway ==
Koppe retired from the sport in 1989 and owned a motorcycle shop with a Suziki, Husaberg and KTM franchise. He is married to Roslyn with five children (and a daughter from a previous marriage), they live in Townsville North Queensland Australia. He is semi-retired from the franchise, letting his sons run the business and he supports their own ventures into motorcycle racing, with some success. His eldest son, Jarrod held numerous state and national dirt track titles, including the Super Motard Queensland title. His second son, Damien, was also successful and raced for Sheffield Tigers.
