= Danny Kennedy (speedway rider) =

Australian speedway rider

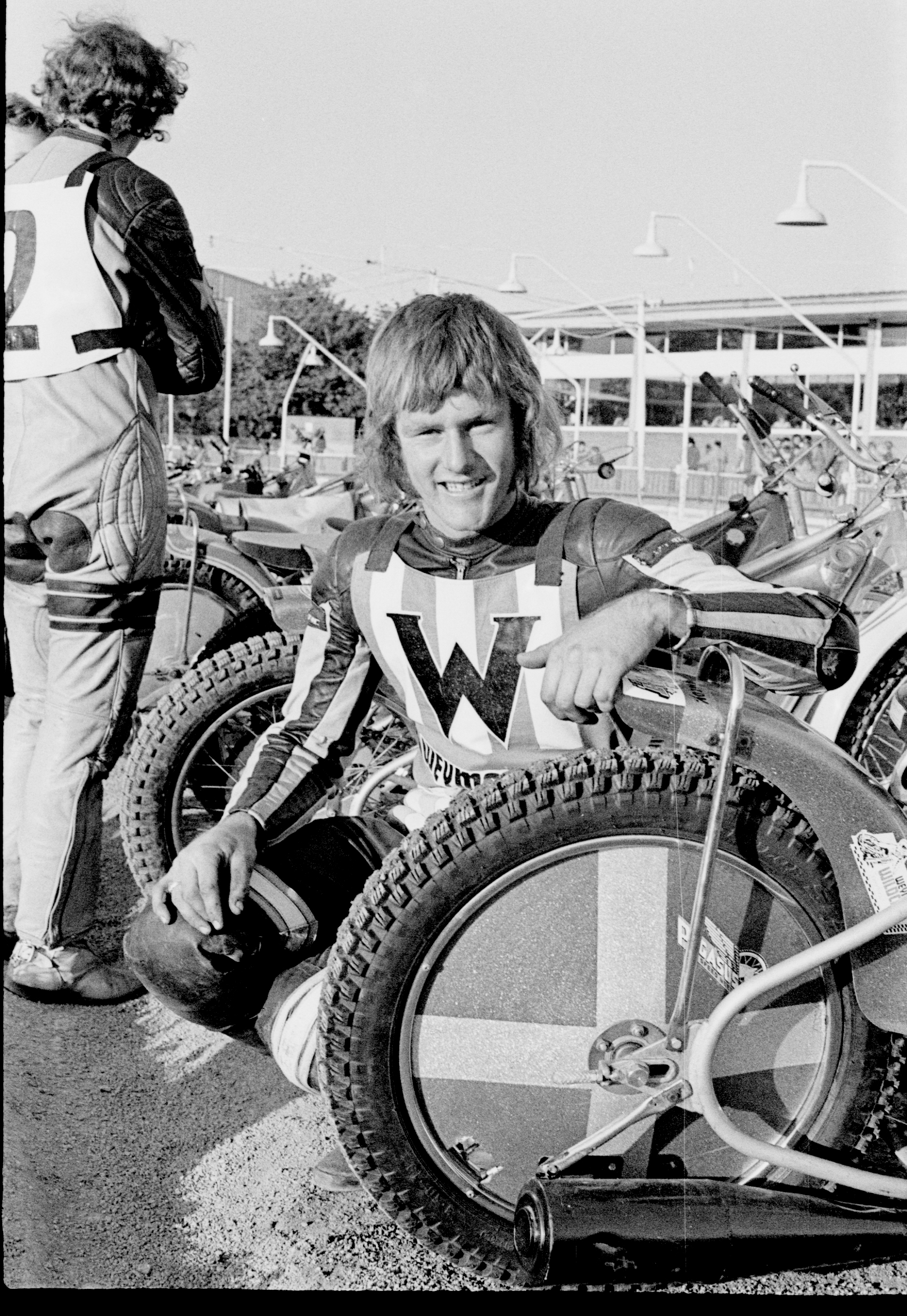
- Born: 18 June 1958; Ballarat, Australia
- Died: 14 June 1993 (aged 34)
- Nationality: Australian

Career history
- 1976: Newport
- 1976–1978: Weymouth Wizards/Wildcats
- 1977: Bristol Bulldogs
- 1978–1982: Poole Pirates

Individual honours
- 1981: Australasian Championship silver medal
- 1978: Warners Grand National
- 1976: Victorian State Champion

Daniel Gerard Kennedy (18 June 1958 – 14 June 1993) was an Australian motorcycle speedway rider.

== Career ==
Kennedy made his British leagues debut during the 1976 British League season, where he rode for Newport Wasps, after riding once match for Canterbury. He cracked his collar bone riding for the Crusaders. He also doubled up for Weymouth Wizards in the 1976 National League. In the 1975-76 Australian season, he won the Victorian Individual Speedway Championship.

Kennedy continued to double up, staying with Weymouth in the National League and hitting a 9.16 average during the 1978 National League season. In the British league, he rode for Bristol Bulldogs before joining Poole Pirates for the 1978 British League season.

In 1980, Kennedy represented the Australia national speedway team during the 1980 Speedway World Team Cup and won the silver medal at the 1981 Australasian Individual Speedway Championship. He rode again for Australia in the 1981 Speedway World Team Cup and would ride for Australia ten times in total.

Kennedy died of a brain tumour in 1993.
