= John Titman =

Australian speedway rider

- Born: 26 January 1951 (age 75); Brisbane, Queensland
- Nationality: Australian

Career history
- 1972–1973: Halifax Dukes
- 1975–1977: Exeter Falcons
- 1978–1981: Leicester Lions
- 1982–1983: Hackney Hawks
- 1984: Wimbledon Dons

Individual honours
- 1977: Australian Champion
- 1978, 1979, 1980, 1981, 1983, 1984, 1986: Queensland State Champion

Team honours
- 1986: Australian Best Pairs Champion

John Charles Titman (born 26 January 1951) is an Australian former motorcycle speedway rider who was Australian Champion in 1977.

== Biography ==
Born in Brisbane, Queensland, Titman initially worked as a mechanic, making his speedway debut at the Brisbane Exhibition Ground in April 1968. He made his British League debut with Halifax Dukes in 1972, and also made his international debut for Australia that year against the British Lions. In 1973, he averaged 6.92 from 38 matches, and became a regular member of the Australian team. In 1973 he finished in seventh place (with John Boulger) in the Australian qualifying round of the World Pairs championship. He also raced in Poland and New Zealand. He moved on to the Exeter Falcons in 1975.

Titman won the Australian Solo Championship in 1977 on his home track, the Brisbane Exhibition Ground. He also finished runner-up in the Australian championship to Phil Crump in 1975 at the Sydney Showground Speedway, and again in 1986 at the Pioneer Park Speedway in Ayr behind fellow Queenslander Troy Butler.

Titman signed for the Leicester Lions in 1978, becoming club captain in 1979. After falling to third in the Lions averages in 1981 and being stripped of the captaincy, he was transfer listed at the end of the season, and moved on to the Hackney Hawks in 1982. He moved on again in 1984 to the Wimbledon Dons, and this was his final season in British speedway.

During his career, Titman made the World Final on two occasions, finishing eighth in 1978 and ninth in 1979. Titman also rode in longtrack speedway, reaching the world final in 1983 and 1984. After returning home at the end of 1984, Titman continued to ride, captaining the Australian national team for a further three years.

In 2022, Titman was inducted into the Speedway Australia's Hall of Fame.

== Career record ==
All figures relate to the British League.

Year	Team	Matches	Rides	Points	Bonus	Total	Average	Full Maximum	Paid Maximum
1972	Halifax Dukes	34	119	101	19	120	4.03		
1973	Halifax Dukes	38	167	274	15	289	6.92		
1975	Exeter Falcons	32	127	165	22	187	5.89		1
1976	Exeter Falcons	37	155	251	20	271	6.99		
1977	Exeter Falcons	40	177	327	38	365	8.25	1	4
1978	Leicester Lions	40	175	375	16	391	8.94	6	2
1979	Leicester Lions	35	163	326	19	345	8.47	1	1
1980	Leicester Lions	31	129	227	21	248	7.69		1
1981	Leicester Lions	47	227	376	46	422	7.44	1	1
1982	Hackney Hawks	36	145	215	24	239	6.59		
1983	Hackney Hawks	41	167	233	28	251	6.25	1	1
1984	Wimbledon Dons	47	187	238	34	272	5.82		

== World Final Appearances ==
=== Individual World Championship ===
- 1978 - (United Kingdom) London, Wembley Stadium - 9th - 7pts
- 1979 - (Poland) Chorzów, Silesian Stadium - 12th - 5pts

=== World Pairs Championship ===
- 1979 - (Denmark) Vojens, Speedway Center (with Phil Crump) - 4th - 19pts (6)

== World Longtrack Championship ==
Finalist

- 1983 (Czech Republic) Mariánské Lázně 9pts (11th)
- 1984 (Germany) Herxheim 11pts (10th)
