= Ivan Mauger =

New Zealand speedway rider (1939–2018)

Ivan Mauger OBE
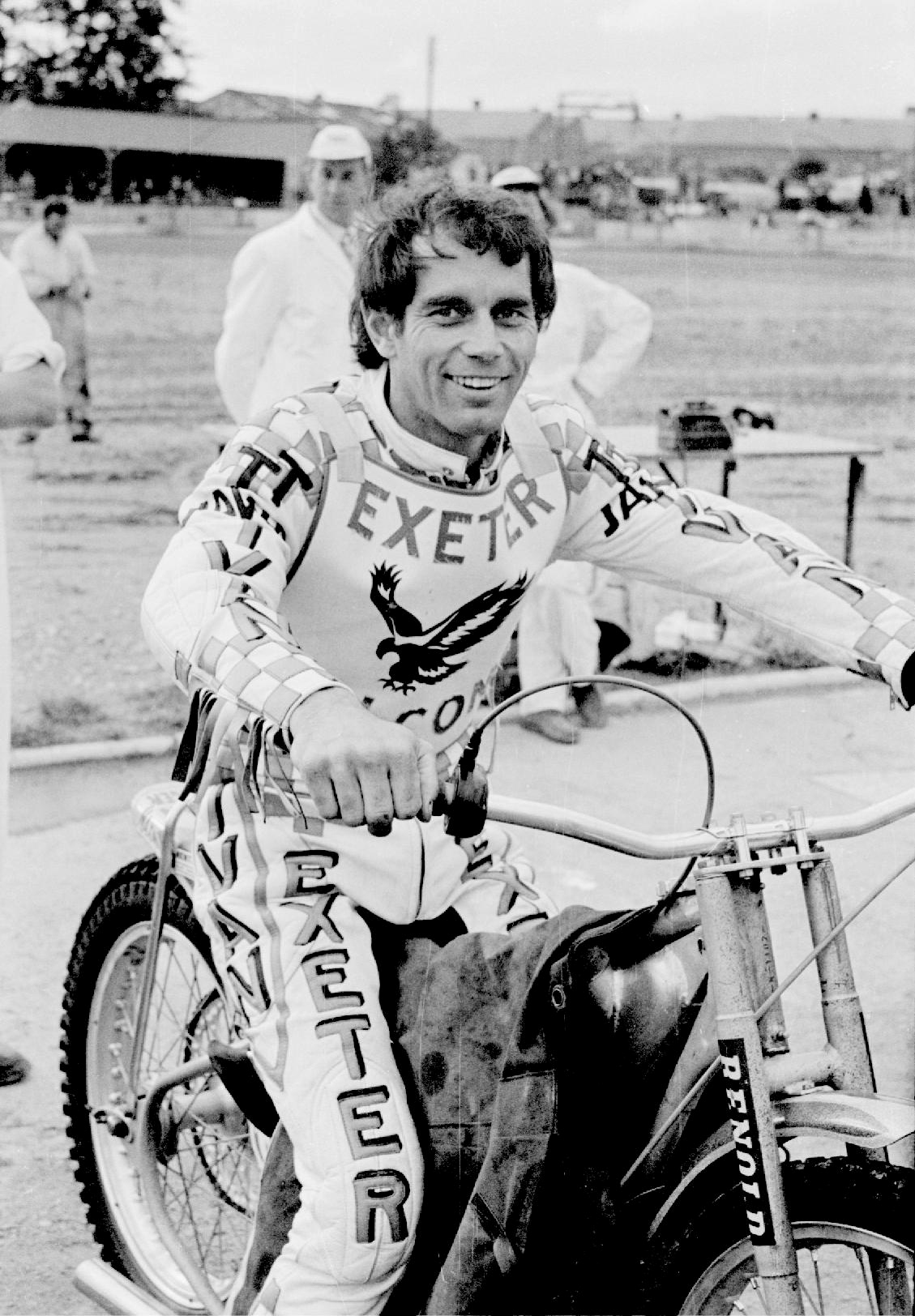
- Born: 4 October 1939; Christchurch, New Zealand
- Died: 16 April 2018 (aged 78); Gold Coast, Queensland, Australia
- Nickname: Sprouts; The Galloping Mauger
- Nationality: New Zealander

Career history
- 1957–1958, 1963: Wimbledon Dons
- 1957: Rye House Roosters
- 1963–1968: Newcastle Diamonds
- 1969–1972: Belle Vue Aces
- 1973–1977, 1984: Exeter Falcons
- 1978–1981: Hull Vikings

Individual honours
- 1968, 1969, 1970, 1972, 1977, 1979: World Champion
- 1971, 1972, 1976: Long Track World Champion
- 1962, 1963: Victorian State Champion
- 1962: Qld State Champion
- 1962: Australian Long Track Champion
- 1963, 1964: Provincial League Riders' Champion
- 1964, 1967, 1968, 1969, 1972, 1980: Northern Riders' Champion
- 1966, 1970, 1971, 1975: European Final winner
- 1968, 1970, 1971, 1972: British Champion
- 1970, 1971, 1972: Australasian Grand Prix winner
- 1970, 1971, 1972: Internationale
- 1970, 1971, 1972, 1973: Scottish Open Champion
- 1971, 1973: British League Riders Champion
- 1972: Manpower Trophy
- 1972: Superama
- 1973: WA State Champion
- 1973, 1980, 1981, 1983: King of Claremont
- 1973: Littlechild
- 1974, 1981: New Zealand Champion
- 1974: Pride of the East
- 1974: Brandonapolis
- 1975: Intercontinental Final winner
- 1975, 1978, 1979, 1980: Yorkshire TV Trophy
- 1977, 1981: Australasian Champion
- 1983, 1984, 1985, 1986: New Zealand Long track Champion
- 1986: West End Speedway International

Team honours
- 1968, 1971, 1972, 1979: World Team Cup winner
- 1969, 1970: World Pairs Champion
- 1964: Provincial League Champion
- 1970, 1971, 1972, 1974: British League Champion
- 1972: British League KO Cup Winner

Ivan Gerald Mauger OBE (4 October 1939 – 16 April 2018; last name pronounced "Major") was a New Zealand motorcycle speedway rider. He won a record six World Championships (Finals), a feat equalled only with the inclusion of the Speedway GP Championships by Bartosz Zmarzlik of Poland and Tony Rickardsson of Sweden. In 2010, Mauger was named an FIM Legend for his motorcycling achievements.

== Career ==
=== United Kingdom ===
Mauger first arrived in the UK as a 17-year-old aboard the SS Rangitoto, which docked at Tilbury in 1957, with his teenage bride Raye, renting a one-bedroom flat in Wimbledon around the corner from Plough Lane where Ronnie Moore and Barry Briggs were the star names. Inspired by Moore, Mauger's began racing at Plough Lane in the second-half 'faces of the future' races and assisted the groundsman. He only rode a handful of races for Wimbledon Dons during the 1957 and 1958 seasons.

A major breakthrough in Mauger's career occurred in 1963 when he returned to England with Raye and his young family to join Mike Parker's Provincial league team Newcastle Diamonds. He averaged 10.42 that season and won the Provincial League Riders' Championship, held at Hyde Road on 28 September 1963. He then won the Riders' Championship for the second successive year in 1964 and topped the league averages with an impressive 11.54 average and helping Newcastle win the league title. His 1965 season was interrupted after he broke an ankle riding in a league match.

In 1966, Mauger qualified for his first world final where he finished fourth, and won the first of his six record breaking World Championships in 1968. In 1968, he was considered the league's best rider and after a public falling out with Parker, Mauger put in a transfer request in December 1968, stating that the mental strain of riding with Newcastle was endangering his health.

Mauger joined the Belle Vue Aces in 1969, where he enjoyed his greatest league team achievements. As a Belle Vue Ace he won the title in 1970, 1971 and 1972. In 1969, Mauger finished with a British League record average of 11.67. He dropped only 13 points from his 37 completed League & Speedway Star KO Cup matches. During these matches, he recorded 22 full maximums, and three paid maximums.

Mauger joined the Exeter Falcons in 1973 and would spend five years at the club. In 1977 he equalled Ove Fundin's then-record of five World Championship wins. In 1978 he joined the Hull Vikings, winning his last and record sixth world title in 1979. He left Hull in 1981, but returned in 1984 at the age of 44 for Exeter where he competed in home meetings.

=== Australasia ===
In his home country of New Zealand, Mauger is considered a national sporting hero. He has won the New Zealand Championship on two occasions (1974 and 1981), and scored his first podium in the championship with second in 1959 behind then dual World Champion Barry Briggs.

Adelaide based Speedway promoter Kym Bonython signed Mauger to ride the 1960/61 Australian season based at the Rowley Park Speedway. Mauger had considerable success riding in Australia throughout his career. In 1962 he was the Australian Long Track Champion, as well as the Victorian and Queensland State Champion. He also finished runner up in the 1962 Australian Solo Championship in Rockhampton, Queensland. He would repeat his Victorian Championship win in 1963, and would finish third in the Australian Championship in the same year. Ten years later in 1973, Mauger would win the Western Australian State Championship, held at the Claremont Speedway in Perth.

Mauger credits advice he received from Australia's former World Champion Jack Young (whose home track was Rowley Park when Mauger was based for the season) for steering him on the path to becoming a World Champion himself. Young told Mauger that it isn't the fastest rider who wins the World Championship, it's the rider who at the end of the meeting had scored the most points and that to get there he had to conserve his bike to make sure he finished. Being the fastest rider didn't mean much if he led a race until half a lap from home but had pushed the bike beyond its limits and didn't finish. Ironically the same fate awaited Mauger in the 1961 Australian Long track Championship when his clutch gave out after leading 4½ laps, but he would make amends and win the title in 1962 at Port Pirie.

Mauger was the Australasian Grand Prix winner in 1971, 1972 and 1973 at the Liverpool Speedway in Sydney. He later would win the Australasian Championship in 1977 at the Sydney Showground Speedway, and in 1981 again at Liverpool. Mauger rode his last meeting in Australia back where he first rode in the country in Adelaide. Mauger rode in the South Australia 150 Jubilee at the Wayville Showground in 1986. There he was presented with the winners trophy by his idol Jack Young.

== International ==
Mauger is considered to be one of the best speedway riders of all-time and jointly holds the record for most Speedway World Championship wins with Sweden's Tony Rickardsson, and Poland's Bartosz Zmarzlik, with six wins each.

Mauger won the Individual Speedway World Championship in 1968, 1969, 1970, 1972, 1977 and 1979. He was runner up in 1971, 1973 and 1974, and third in 1967. Mauger's second place in 1971 at the Ullevi Stadium in Sweden was to the man whom he not only taught to ride a speedway bike but would become his great friend and rival throughout the 1970s, Denmark's Ole Olsen.

Representing New Zealand, Mauger was the Speedway World Pairs Champion in 1969 with Bob Andrews (1969 was the unofficial World Championship), and 1970 with Ronnie Moore. The 1970 Pairs Championship held at the Malmö Stadion in Malmö, Sweden, was the first official FIM World Championship held for Pairs. He would finish runner up in the championship in 1971, 1972, 1978 and 1981, before one last podium in 1984 when he finished third with Mitch Shirra.

Mauger was also the Speedway World Team Cup Champion in 1968, 1969 and 1971 while riding for Great Britain (the British team regularly consisted of riders from the Commonwealth nations). He would win the title again in 1979 as captain of New Zealand.

During his career, Mauger also raced in the World Long Track Championship, winning the title in 1971, 1972 and 1976, bringing his total of World Championships in speedway racing to 15. Mauger was also runner up at the Longtrack Championship in 1974 and 1975, beaten both times by West Germany's Egon Müller, who himself would go on to win the Speedway World Championship in 1983.

== Honours and awards ==
Mauger was appointed a Member of the Order of the British Empire (MBE) in the 1976 New Year Honours, for services to speedway riding. In the 1989 New Year Honours, he was promoted to Officer of the Order of the British Empire (OBE) for services to speedway sport.

Mauger was an inaugural inductee into the New Zealand Sports Hall of Fame in 1990. He was voted the prestigious Millennium Man of Speedway by the readers of Speedway Star and Vintage Speedway Magazine in December 1999. He was selected by the Olympic Committee to carry the Olympic Torch at the Sydney Games, an honour which he performed on 12 June 2000.

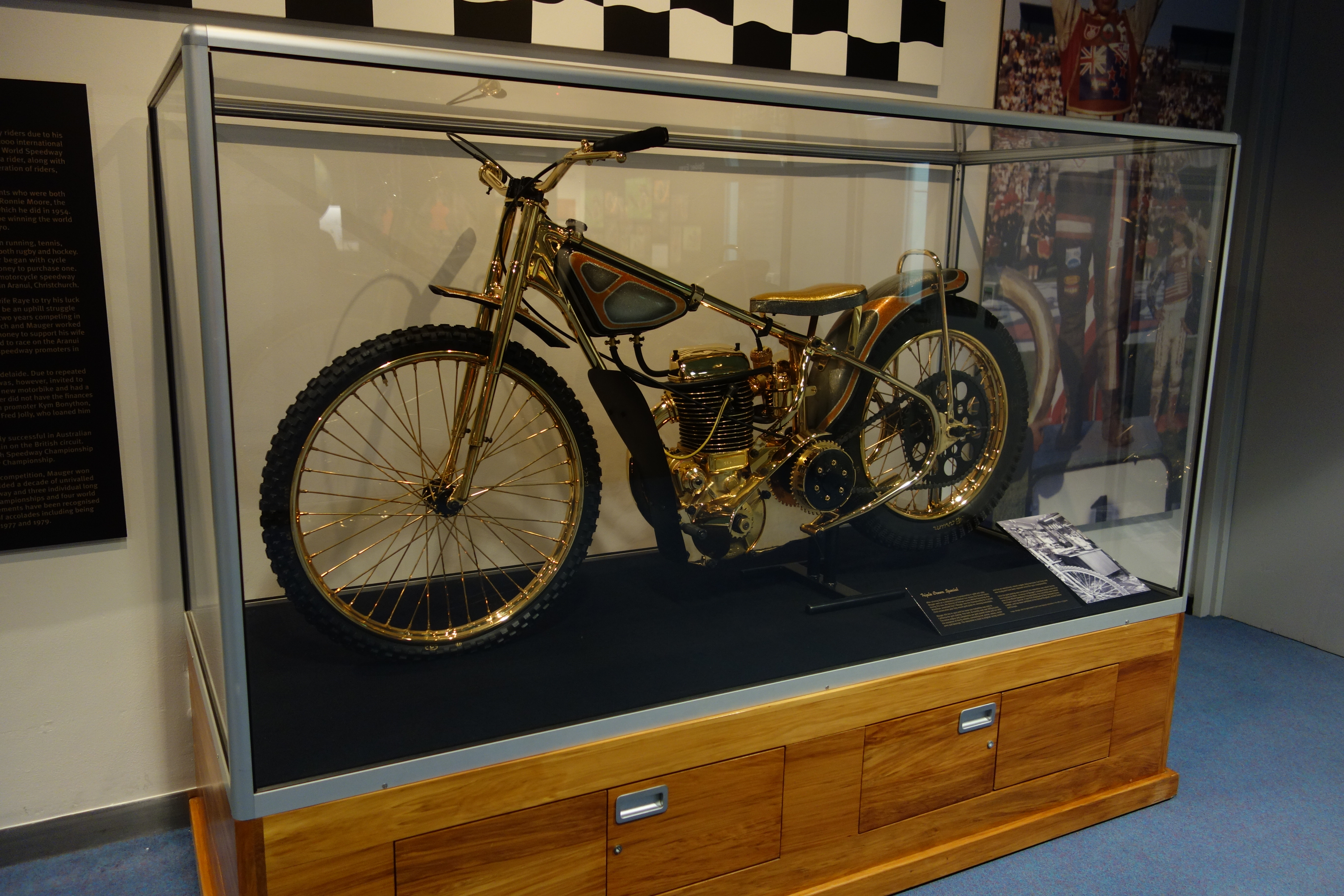
Triple Crown Special on display at Canterbury Museum

In 1970, two men in the USA named George Wenn and Ray Bokelman said that if Ivan Mauger won his third World Final in a row at Wrocław (Poland), they would have the winning bike gold plated. Mauger duly won the World Final that year, and true to their promise, the bike was taken to America and Gold plated, and so was born the "Triple Crown Special". The machine is on display at Canterbury Museum in Christchurch, New Zealand.

== Personal life ==
Mauger and his wife of over 60 years, Raye, lived on Australia's Gold Coast. He was an active supporter of speedway, attending many meetings throughout the Australian season, as well as the Speedway Grand Prix of New Zealand, held at the Western Springs Stadium in Auckland.

Mauger was president of World Speedway Riders' Association from 2007 to 2008. He died in Gold Coast, Queensland, Australia, on 16 April 2018.

== Titles ==
- World Champion: 1968, 1969, 1970, 1972, 1977, 1979 – R/Up 1971, 1973, 1974
- New Zealand Sportsperson of the Year (Halberg Award) 1977 and 1979.
- Long Track World Champion 1971, 1972, 1976 R/Up 1974, 1975
- World Pairs Champion 1969, 1970 R/Up 1971, 1972, 1978, 1981
- Speedway World Team Cup Champion 1968, 1971, 1972, 1979
- European Champion 1966, 1970, 1971, 1975
- British Champion 1968, 1970, 1971, 1972
- Intercontinental Champion 1975
- New Zealand Champion 1974, 1981
- New Zealand Long Track Champion 1983, 1984, 1985, 1986
- New Zealand South Island Champion 1977, 1981, 1983
- Australasian Champion 1977, 1981
- Australasian Grand Prix winner 1970, 1971, 1972
- Sunday Times King of Claremont winner 1973, 1980, 1981, 1983
- British-Nordic Champion 1968, 1971
- British League Riders Champion 1971, 1973
- Embassy Internationale Winner 1970, 1971, 1972
- Northern Riders Champion 1964, 1967, 1968, 1969, 1972, 1980
- Provincial League Riders Champion 1963, 1964
- Lubos Tomicek Memorial Trophy Winner 1971, 1972, 1973, 1979
- Silver Sash Match Race Champion 1968, 1969
- Golden Helmet Match Race Champion 1970
- Scottish Open Champion 1970, 1971, 1972, 1973
- Scotianapolis Winner 1969, 1970
- Welsh Open Champion 1964, 1973
- Westernapolis Winner 1968, 1968, 1971, 1972, 1973, 1975
- Leningrad Cup (USSR) Winner 1969
- Lokeren Memorial Trophy Winner 1970
- Golden Key of Bremen 1968, 1969, 1970, 1971, 1972, 1973, 1974, 1975
- Australian Long Track Champion 1962
- Victorian State Champion (Australia) 1962, 1963
- Queensland State Champion (Australia) 1962
- Western Australian State Champion 1973
- Yorkshire Television Trophy 1975, 1978, 1979, 1980
- Lada Indoor International 1979
- British Long Track Champion 1980
- World Champion of Champions Match Race Series 1989
- South Australian 150 Jubilee Trophy 1986

== Speedway World Final appearances ==
=== Individual World Championship ===
- 1966 – (Sweden) Gothenburg, Ullevi – 4th – 11pts
- 1967 – (England) London, Wembley Stadium – 3rd – 13pts
- 1968 – (Sweden) Gothenburg, Ullevi – Winner – 15pts
- 1969 – (England) London, Wembley Stadium – Winner – 14pts
- 1970 – (Poland) Wrocław, Olympic Stadium – Winner – 15pts
- 1971 – (Sweden) Gothenburg, Ullevi – 2nd – 12pts+3pts
- 1972 – (England) London, Wembley Stadium – Winner – 13pts+3pts
- 1973 – (Poland) Chorzów, Silesian Stadium – 2nd – 13pts + F
- 1974 – (Sweden) Gothenburg, Ullevi – 2nd – 11pts + 3pts
- 1975 – (England) London, Wembley Stadium – 4th – 12pts + 2pts
- 1976 – (Poland) Chorzó, Silesian Stadium – 4th – 11pts
- 1977 – (Sweden) Gothenburg, Ullevi – Winner – 14pts
- 1978 – (England) London, Wembley Stadium – 8th – 8pts
- 1979 – (Poland) Chorzów, Silesian Stadium – Winner – 14pts

=== World Pairs Championship ===
- 1969 – (Sweden) Stockholm, Gubbängens IP (with Bob Andrews) – Winner – 28pts (18)
- 1970 – (Sweden) Malmö, Malmö Stadion (with Ronnie Moore) – Winner – 28pts (12)
- 1971 – (Poland) Rybnik, Rybnik Municipal Stadium (with Barry Briggs) – 2nd – 25pts (12)
- 1972 – (Sweden) Borås, Ryavallen (with Ronnie Moore) – 2nd – 24pts (14)
- 1973 – (Sweden) Borås, Ryavallen (with Graeme Stapleton) – 7th – 10pts (8)
- 1974 – (England) Manchester, Hyde Road (with Barry Briggs) – 3rd – 21pts (17)
- 1976 – (Sweden) Eskilstuna, Snälltorpet (with Barry Briggs) – 5th – 15pts (8)
- 1977 – (England) Manchester, Hyde Road (with Larry Ross) – 5th – 17pts (16)
- 1978 – (Poland) Chorzów, Silesian Stadium (with Larry Ross) – 2nd – 24pts (12+2)
- 1979 – (Denmark) Vojens, Vojens Speedway Center (with Larry Ross) – 6th – 12pts (6)
- 1980 – (Socialist Federal Republic of Yugoslavia) Krško, Matija Gubec Stadium (with Larry Ross) – 5th – 16pts (11)
- 1981 – (Poland) Chorzów, Silesian Stadium (with Larry Ross) – 2nd – 22pts (12)
- 1983 – (Sweden) Gothenburg, Ullevi (with Larry Ross) – 7th – 11pts (7)
- 1984 – (Italy) Lonigo, Santa Marina Stadium (with Mitch Shirra) – 3rd – 25pts (9+2)
- 1985 – (Poland) Rybnik, Rybnik Municipal Stadium (with Mitch Shirra) – 4th – 15pts (8)

=== World Team Cup ===
- 1966 – (Poland) Wrocław, Olympic Stadium (with Barry Briggs / Terry Betts / Nigel Boocock / Colin Pratt) – 4th – 8pts (3)
- 1967 – (Sweden) Malmö, Malmö Stadion (with Ray Wilson / Barry Briggs / Eric Boocock / Colin Pratt) – 3rd= – 19pts (2)
- 1968 – (England) London, Wembley Stadium (with Barry Briggs / Nigel Boocock / Martin Ashby / Norman Hunter) – Winner – 40pts (12)
- 1969 – (Poland) Rybnik, Rybnik Municipal Stadium (with Martin Ashby / Nigel Boocock / Barry Briggs / Pete Smith) – 2nd – 27pts (9)
- 1970 – (England) London, Wembley Stadium (with Barry Briggs / Nigel Boocock / Eric Boocock / Ray Wilson) – 2nd – 31pts (9)
- 1971 – (Poland) Wrocław, Olympic Stadium (with Jim Airey / Ray Wilson / Barry Briggs / Ronnie Moore) – Winner – 37pts (10)
- 1972 – (West Germany) Olching, Olching Speedwaybahn (with Ray Wilson / Terry Betts / John Louis / Ronnie Moore) Winner – 36pts (11)
- 1979 – (England) London, White City Stadium (with Larry Ross / Mitch Shirra / Bruce Cribb / Roger Abel) – Winner – 35pts (9)

* 1966–1972 as a member of Great Britain. 1979 with New Zealand

== World Longtrack Championship ==
Finals

- 1971 – (Norway) Oslo (Champion) 27pts
- 1972 – (West Germany) Mühldorf (Champion) 30pts
- 1974 – (West Germany) Scheeßel (Second) 26pts
- 1975 – (Socialist Federal Republic of Yugoslavia) Gornja Radgona (Second) 22pts
- 1976 – (Czechoslovakia) Mariánské Lázně (Champion) 26pts
- 1977 – (Denmark) Aalborg (9th) 12pts
- 1978 – (West Germany) Mühldorf (4th) 24pts (lost a run-off to Peter Collins)
- 1979 – (Czechoslovakia) Mariánské Lázně (10th) 8pts
- 1980 – (Germany) Scheeßel (8th) 9pts
- 1981 – (Socialist Federal Republic of Yugoslavia) Gornja Radgona (11th) 6pts
- 1982 – (Denmark) Esbjerg (6th) 14pt
- 1983 – (Czechoslovakia) Mariánské Lázně (9th) 11pts
- 1984 – (West Germany) Herxheim (13th) 5pts
- 1985 – (Denmark) Esbjerg (15th) 4pts

== Grasstrack ==
Among Mauger's many honours he also took his share on grass. These included titles in the Bewdley Bonanza, the Lydden International and the Western Winner.

== Guinness Book of Records ==
- Most Individual Championship wins – 9 (6 Speedway / 3 Long track),
- First person to win World Speedway and Long track Championships in the same year – 1972,
- Only person to win 3 Individual World Championships in succession – 1968, 1969 and 1970,
- Most individual World Speedway wins – 6 (joint with Tony Rickardsson and Bartosz Zmarzlik)
- Most World Championship Finals appearances with 52,
- First person to win World Speedway, World Long track, World Pairs, and World Team Cup Championships (achieved in 1971 with World Long track win)
