= 1948 Speedway National League Division Two =

British motorcycle speedway season

- League: National League Division Two
- No. of competitors: 9
- Champions: Bristol Bulldogs
- National Trophy (Div 2 final): Birmingham Brummies
- Anniversary Cup: Birmingham Brummies
- Highest average: Fred Tuck
- Division/s above: National League (Div 1)
- Division/s below: National League (Div 3)

The 1948 National League Division Two was the third post-war season of the second tier of motorcycle speedway in Great Britain. Edinburgh Monarchs were new participants as the league was extended to 9 teams.

== Summary ==
Wigan Warriors were replaced by Fleetwood Flyers after just 3 away matches with their entire team transferring. A quickfire 19 days effort resulted in the concrete wall surrounding the Highbury Stadium pitch being demolished and a 30 feet wide track being constructed.

Bristol Bulldogs were crowned champions.

32-year-old Bill Wilson of the Middlesbrough Bears was fatally injured, on 3 July at Norwich and died two days later in hospital.

== Final table ==
Pos	Team	PL	W	D	L	Pts
1	Bristol Bulldogs	32	23	0	9	46
2	Birmingham Brummies	32	20	1	11	41
3	Middlesbrough Bears	32	18	2	12	38
4	Sheffield Tigers	32	17	1	14	35
5	Norwich Stars	32	17	0	15	34
6	Glasgow White City Tigers	32	14	3	15	31
7	Newcastle Diamonds	32	11	0	21	22
8	Fleetwood Flyers	32	10	1	21	21
9	Edinburgh Monarchs	32	10	0	22	20

- Wigan Warriors were replaced by Fleetwood Flyers after 3 away matches

== Fixtures & results ==
=== A fixtures ===
Home \ Away	BIR	BRI	ED	FLE	GLA	MID	NEW	NOR	SHE
Birmingham		39–44	59–25	40–44	53–31	42–42	50–34	51–33	57–27
Bristol	65–19		64–20	49–35	53–31	49–35	57–27	60–24	61–23
Edinburgh	43–41	38–46		45–39	39–44	45–39	29–55	39–45	47–36
Fleetwood	38–46	41–42	34–49		48–36	37–47	44–39	31–53	39–45
Glasgow	48–36	36–48	49–35	49–34		37–47	47–35	41–42	55–29
Middlesbrough	65–18	50–33	57–27	65–19	61–22		59–25	57–27	51–33
Newcastle	49–35	37–47	53–31	38–45	37–46	39–45		50–34	39–44
Norwich	50–34	56–28	56–28	45–37	53–31	39–45	54–30		62–21
Sheffield	50–34	43–40	60–23	48–36	55–28	45–39	46–38	45–39	

Legend: Blue = home team win; Yellow = draw; Red = away team win.

=== B fixtures ===
Home \ Away	BIR	BRI	ED	FLE	GLA	MID	NEW	NOR	SHE
Birmingham		62–22	58–26	62–22	65–19	64–19	66–18	58–26	58–26
Bristol	52–32		64–19	57–27	65–18	56–28	67–17	49–35	55–29
Edinburgh	33–51	53–31		42–41	52–32	56–27	45–39	33–51	39–44
Fleetwood	40–44	51–33	50–34		40–44	48–36	52–32	53–31	53–31
Glasgow	39–45	46–38	63–21	42–42		55–29	54–30	60–24	42–42
Middlesbrough	39–45	38–45	66–18	51–33	42–42		56–28	51–33	47–37
Newcastle	48–36	51–33	58–26	43–41	50–34	38–46		52–32	43–41
Norwich	40–44	34–50	52–32	53–30	66–18	39–45	54–30		46–38
Sheffield	38–45	51–32	64–20	54–30	34–50	57–27	66–18	53–31	

Legend: Blue = home team win; Yellow = draw; Red = away team win.

== Anniversary Cup (Div 2) ==
The Anniversary Cup for Division Two was run in a league format. Birmingham Brummies came out on top.

=== Final table ===
Pos	Team	PL	W	D	L	Pts
1	Birmingham Brummies	16	12	0	4	24
2	Sheffield Tigers	16	9	0	7	16
3	Bristol Bulldogs	16	8	0	8	16
4	Glasgow White City Tigers	16	8	0	8	16
5	Middlesbrough Bears	16	8	0	8	16
6	Norwich Stars	16	7	1	8	15
7	Fleetwood Flyers	16	7	1	8	15
8	Newcastle Diamonds	16	6	0	10	12
9	Edinburgh Monarchs	16	6	0	10	12

Home \ Away	BIR	BRI	ED	FLE	GLA	MID	NEW	NOR	SHE
Birmingham		59–37	69–27	51–45	69–27	60–36	61–34	53–43	43–53
Bristol	58–37		71–25	56–40	55–39	58–37	58–38	62–32	66–29
Edinburgh	39–57	64–32		58–38	47–49	58–38	57–27	52–44	53–42
Fleetwood	47–49	51–45	54–42		62–34	69–27	59–37	55–41	56–40
Glasgow	51–45	56–40	71–24	68–28		40–55	54–42	63–32	51–45
Middlesbrough	40–55	66–30	59–37	51–45	54–42		53–43	58–38	62–34
Newcastle	46–50	63–33	62–30	54–42	50–46	53–43		45–47	58–36
Norwich	44–51	69–27	73–23	47–47	64–32	66–30	60–35		56–40
Sheffield	54–42	56–40	69–27	55–41	69–27	70–26	55–41	60–36	

Legend: Blue = home team win; Yellow = draw; Red = away team win.

== Top five riders (league only) ==
	Rider	Nat	Team	C.M.A.
1	Fred Tuck	(England)	Bristol	10.20
2	Frank Hodgson	(England)	Middlesbrough	9.84
3	Graham Warren	(Australia)	Birmingham	9.84
4	Wilf Plant	(England)	Middlesbrough/Fleetwood	9.24
5	Jack Hunt	(New Zealand)	Newcastle	9.22

== National Trophy ==
The 1948 Trophy (sponsored by the Daily Mail) was the 11th edition of the Knockout Cup. The Qualifying event for Division 3 teams saw Southampton Saints win the final and qualify for the Elimination event. The Elimination event for Division 2 teams saw Birmingham Brummies win the final and qualify for the Quarter Finals proper.

Elimination Event First Round

Date	Team One	Score	Team Two
19/06	Birmingham	79-29	Southampton
15/06	Southampton	41-66	Birmingham
16/06	Glasgow White City	70-38	Edinburgh
19/06	Edinburgh	62-46	Glasgow White City

Elimination Second Round

Date	Team One	Score	Team Two
17/06	Sheffield	55-53	Norwich
19/06	Norwich	76-32	Sheffield
03/07	Birmingham	80-28	Glasgow White City
23/06	Glasgow White City	45.5-61.5	Birmingham
18/06	Bristol	65-43	Fleetwood
22/06	Fleetwood	69-39	Bristol
14/06	Newcastle	41-65	Middlesbrough
17/06	Middlesbrough	67-40	Newcastle

Elimination Third Round

Date	Team One	Score	Team Two
26/07	Birmingham	75-33	Fleetwood
13/07	Fleetwood	49-59	Birmingham
03/07	Norwich	66-41	Middlesbrough
01/07	Middlesbrough	53-54	Norwich

=== Elimination Final ===
First leg

31 July 1948

Norwich Stars Aussie Powell 15 Paddy Mills 12 Ted Bravery 9 Geoff Revett 9 Sid Littlewood 9 Phil Clarke 7 Jack Freeman 3 Reg Morgan 0	64 – 43	Birmingham Brummies Graham Warren 15 Charlie May 10 Doug McLachlan 6 Geoff Bennett 5 Buck Whitby 4 Arthur Payne 2 Stan Dell 1 Brian Wilson 0

The Firs Stadium

Second leg

2 August 1948

Birmingham Brummies Graham Warren 15 Arthur Payne 14 Stan Dell 13 Doug McLachlan 9 Brian Wilson 9 Geoff Bennett 8 Charlie May 6 Buck Whitby 5	79 – 28	Norwich Stars Paddy Mills 10 Ossie Powell 5 Phil Clarke 5 Geoff Revett 3 Ted Bravery 2 Sid Littlewood 2 Jack Freeman 1 Reg Morgan 0

Perry Barr Stadium

== Riders and final averages ==
Birmingham

- (Australia) Graham Warren 9.84
- (England) Stan Dell 8.57
- (Australia) Doug McLachlan 8.26
- (England) Geoff Bennett 7.91
- (Australia) Arthur Payne 7.53
- (England) Brian Wilson 6.79
- (England) Charlie May 6.55
- (Australia) Buck Whitby 5.94
- (England) Roy Dook 5.46
- (England) Dick Tolley 5.39

Bristol

- (England) Fred Tuck 10.20
- (England) Billy Hole 8.95
- (England) Nobby Stock 8.60
- (England) Mike Beddoe 8.45
- (England) Roger Wise 7.94
- (England) Jack Mountford 7.83
- (England) Eric Salmon 7.40
- (England) Cyril Quick 5.38
- (England) Johnny Hole 4.37
- (England) Ginger Nicholls 3.25
- (England) Graham Hole 1.67

Edinburgh

- (Australia) Bill Maddern 7.15
- (New Zealand) Dick Campbell 6.68
- (Australia) Clem Mitchell 6.00
- (England) Eddie Lack 6.00
- (England) Danny Lee 5.50
- (England) Dennis Parker 5.32
- (Australia) Keith Cox 4.96
- (Scotland) Bill Baird 4.74
- (Scotland) Bert Shearer 3.75
- (England) Nobby Downham 3.30
- (England) Don Cuppleditch 2.55

Fleetwood

- (England) Wilf Plant 9.47
- (England) Dick Geary] 9.03
- (England) Norman Hargreaves 7.46
- (England) Jack Gordon 6.06
- (England) Cyril Cooper 5.68
- (England) Reg Lambourne 5.18
- (England) Ron Hart 4.70
- (England) Ernie Appleby 4.54
- (England) Percy Brine 4.14
- (Australia) Dick Seers 2.40
- (England) Jack Winstanley 1.60

Glasgow

- (England) Joe Crowther 8.13
- (Australia) Bat Byrnes 7.80
- (England) Will Lowther 7.59
- (Australia) Buck Ryan 7.20
- (England) Harold Fairhurst 6.21
- (Australia) Norman Lindsay 5.98
- (Australia) Junior Bainbridge 5.57
- (Australia) Gruff Garland 5.00
- (England) Nobby Downham 4.87
- (Scotland) Gordon McGregor 3.83
- (Scotland) Angus McGuire 1.50

Middlesbrough

- (England) Frank Hodgson 9.84
- (England) Wilf Plant 8.88
- (England) Jack Hodgson 8.77
- (England) Geoff Godwin 7.77
- (England) Benny King 6.91
- (England) Billy Wilson 6.23
- (England) Derick Close 6.22
- (England) Tip Mills 5.94
- (England) Herby King 5.45
- (England) Frank Bettis 4.53
- (England) Joe Arthur 4.00
- (England) George Farmer 3.75
- (England) Dick Tolley 3.56

Newcastle

- (New Zealand) Jack Hunt 9.22
- (England) Wilf Jay 8.72
- (Australia) Charlie Spinks 8.17
- (England) Norman Evans 7.41
- (Australia) Ken Le Breton 6.80
- (England) Alec Grant 6.66
- (Australia) Keith Gurtner 4.80
- (England) Rol Stobbart 4.14
- (England) Maurice Stobbart 3.82
- (England) Ed Pye 3.52
- (England) Peter Lloyd 3.41
- (England) Fred Rogers 3.17
- (New Zealand) Danny Calder 3.09

Norwich

- (Australia) Bert Spencer 8.61
- (England) Paddy Mills (Horace Burke) 8.47
- (England) Phil Clarke 8.10
- (England) Ted Bravery 6.79
- (England) Fred Rogers 6.63
- (England) Sid Hipperson 6.50
- (England) Ossie Powell 6.35
- (England) Jack Freeman 6.04
- (Australia) Syd Littlewood 5.49
- (England) Geoff Revett 4.91
- (Northern Ireland) Paddy Hammond 4.00

Sheffield

- (England) Bruce Semmens 9.09
- (England) Tommy Bateman 8.33
- (England) Tommy Allott 7.31
- (England) Len Williams 7.16
- (Australia) Jack Bibby 6.94
- (England) Stan Williams 6.77
- (England) Danny Lee 4.71
- (England) Ken Sharples 4.55
- (England) John Duncan White 4.21
- (England) Bryan Gorman 2.60
- (South Africa) Henry Long 3.50
- (England) Alf Parker 1.56

== See also ==
- List of United Kingdom Speedway League Champions
- Knockout Cup (speedway)
