= 1974 British League Division Two season =

British motorcycle speedway season

- League: British League Division Two
- No. of competitors: 19
- Champions: Birmingham Brummies
- Knockout Cup: Birmingham Brummies
- Individual: Carl Glover
- Highest average: Phil Herne
- Division/s above: British League (Div 1)

The 1974 British League Division Two season was the second tier of motorcycle speedway in Great Britain. It was the final season of British League Division Two before it was renamed as the New National League.

== Summary ==
The league was again expanded by one team from 18 to 19 teams. Weymouth Wizards were the new addition to the league, returning to action after five years out. Additionally there were two in and two out; Hull Vikings had moved up to the British League swapping places with Coatbridge Tigers and also swapping their top riders. Rayleigh Rockets closed down but the promotion, riders and nickname moved to Rye House. It was the first season of league speedway at Rye House since the 1959 Southern Area League.

There were a few changes of nicknames; the Chesterton Potters changed their team name to the Stoke Potters, Bradford became the Barons, Sunderland became the Gladiators and Long Eaton raced as the Archers.

Birmingham Brummies won their first title, completing a league and cup double. Australian Phil Herne improved his average by over 3 points from the 1973 season and Arthur Browning also exceeded a 10 average, the two factors proved to be the catalyst for Birmingham's success. John Hart and George Major both scored heavily throughout the season too.

== Final table ==
Pos	Team	PL	Home					Away					Pts
Pos	Team	PL	W	D	L	F	A	W	D	L	F	A	Pts
1	Birmingham Brummies	35	17	1	0	917	485	9	2	6	711	611	55
2	Eastbourne Eagles	36	18	0	0	927.5	465.5	6	3	9	709	692	51
3	Boston Barracudas	36	18	0	0	841	560	5	2	11	667.5	734.5	48
4	Workington Comets	36	17	1	0	856	546	5	2	11	626	778	47
5	Crewe Kings	36	17	0	1	919.5	482.5	5	0	13	616	784	44
6	Teesside Tigers	36	15	1	2	834	568	4	0	14	614	788	39
7	Bradford Barons	36	17	0	1	787	614	2	1	15	552	849	39
8	Peterborough Panthers	34	14	0	2	740	507	4	1	13	579	822	37
9	Coatbridge Tigers	36	17	0	1	879	521	1	0	17	559	814	36
10	Canterbury Crusaders	36	15	0	3	796	578	3	0	15	597	794	36
11	Berwick Bandits	36	14	1	3	762	640	2	0	16	522	879	33
12	Barrow Bombers	36	12	2	4	810	589	3	0	15	592.5	807.5	32
13	Stoke Potters	36	15	0	3	815	588	1	0	17	574	830	32
14	Ellesmere Port Gunners	35	13	2	3	784	616	1	1	15	547	778	31
15	Long Eaton Archers	36	14	2	2	772	630	0	0	18	530	872	30
16	Rye House Rockets	36	12	0	6	745	651	1	0	17	484	915	26
17	Scunthorpe Saints	36	9	2	7	760	640	1	0	17	573	827	22
18	Sunderland Gladiators	36	10	0	8	755	647	1	0	17	476	923	22
19	Weymouth Wizards	36	10	0	8	711.5	687.5	0	0	18	486.5	913.5	20

== Fixtures and results ==
Home \ Away	BAR	BER	BIR	BOS	BRA	CAN	COA	CK	EAS	EP	LE	PET	RH	SCU	STO	SUN	TEE	WEY	WOR
Barrow		50–28	39–39	35–43	30–48	40–38	47–31	48–30	38–39	42–35	52–26	53–25	56–21	45–32*	48–30	55–23	44–34	49–28	39–39
Berwick	39–38		32–46	37–41	39–39	42–36	44–34	49–28	40–38	42–36	44–34	38–40	46–32	42–36	51–27	46–32	44–34	44–34	43–35
Birmingham	52–25	53–25		43–35	54–24	52–26	47–31	49–29	39–39	57–21	56–22	56–22	57–21	51–27	42–36	60–17	43–35	48–30	58–20
Boston	49–29	49–29	44–34		58–20	43–34	41–37	50–28	40–38	45–33	47–31	41–36	50–28	46–31	43–35	57–21	46–32	49–29	43–35
Bradford	42–36	43–35	26–51	48–30		48–30	49–28	42–36	40–38	42–36	40–37	49–29	50–28	41–37	41–37	44–34	44–34	54–24	44–34
Canterbury	49–29	49–29	29–48	42–36	55–23		41–09	46–32	34–44	59–19	50–28	32–46	48–30	44–34	45–33	46–31	46–32	43–35	38–40
Coatbridge	41–37	36–41	45–33	48–30	41–36	58–20		57–20	42–36	49–29	50–28	55–23	59–19	44–34	47–31	61–16	43–35	54–24	49–29
Crewe	61–17	61–17	40–37	52–26	52–26	52–26	51–27		55–23	54–24	49–29	55–23	48–30	46–32	54–24	49–29	52–26	50.5–26.5	38–40
Eastbourne	47–31	58–20	47–31	41.5–36.5	58–20	38–39	51–27	54–24		49–29	55–23	57–21	59–19	54–23	51–27	55–23	44–34	52–26	57–21
Ellesmere Port	48–29	48–29	39–39	30–47	49–29	44–34	40–38	37–41	39–39		45–32	41–37	56–22	42–36	38–40	47–31	49–29	52–26	40–38
Long Eaton	44–34	39–38	33–45	37–41	47–30	44–34	40–38	41–37	40–38	39–39		39–39	52–26	47–31	48–30	53–25	43–35	42–36	44–34
Peterborough	47–31	49–29	nh	42–36	45–33	29–49	50–28	37–41	43–35	nh	47–31		55–23	50–28	44–34	60–18	41–36	55–23	46–32
Rye House	42–36	50–28	31–46	40–38	50–28	44–33	41–36	37–40	28–49	48–30	40–38	33–44		47–30	47–31	42–35	37–41	50–28	38–40
Scunthorpe	38–40	37–41	31–47	39–39	53–24	43–35	58–20	35–43	32–46	31–47	44–34	42–35	52–25		48–30	56–22	32–46	50–27	39–39
Stoke	40–38	51–27	38–40	34–44	41–37	46–32	49–29	41–37	36–42	49–29	50–28	46–32	50–27	43–35		56–22	51–27	50–28	44–34
Sunderland	37–40	56–22	33–45	42–36	44–34	36–42	33–45	32–46	40–38	43–35	51–27	54–24	38–39	44–34	41–37		37–41	60–18	34–44
Teesside	54–24	58–20	40–38	39–39	34–44	47–31	51–27	46–31	37–40	41–37	44–34	50–28	44–34	50–28	44–34	52–26		52–26	51–27
Weymouth	36.5–41.5	47–31	20–58	41–36	41–37	35–42	41–36	41–37	30–48	44–34	50–28	34–44	50–27	45–33	48–30	38–39	37–41		33–45
Workington	41–37	45–33	44–34	44–34	58–20	53–25	40–38	42–36	39–39	44–34	58–20	47–31	45–33	46–32	50–28	46–32	55–22	59–18	

Legend: Blue = home team win; Yellow = draw; Red = away team win.
- *This fixture was later awarded as a Scunthorpe away win. Barrow had incorrectly used rider replacement.

== Top five riders (league averages) ==
	Rider	Nat	Team	C.M.A.
1	Phil Herne	(Australia)	Birmingham	10.78
2	Carl Glover	(England)	Boston	10.44
3	Mitch Graham	(England)	Workington	10.29
4	Arthur Browning	(England)	Birmingham	10.17
5	John Jackson	(England)	Crewe	10.07

== British League Division Two Knockout Cup ==
The 1974 British League Division Two Knockout Cup was the seventh edition of the Knockout Cup for tier two teams. Birmingham Brummies were the winners of the competition.

First round

Date	Team one	Score	Team two
02/04	Barrow	36-42	Stoke
29/04	Crewe	43-35	Workington
04/04	Stoke	46-31	Barrow
12/04	Sunderland	37-41	Teesside
18/04	Teesside	55-22	Sunderland
03/05	Workington	46-32	Crewe

Second round

Date	Team one	Score	Team two
25/05	Berwick	29-49	Workington
20/05	Birmingham	47-31	Long Eaton
19/05	Boston	49-28	Weymouth
22/05	Bradford	43-34	Ellesmere Port
04/05	Canterbury	44-34	Eastbourne
03/05	Coatbridge	55-23	Scunthorpe
05/05	Eastbourne	47-31	Canterbury
21/05	Ellesmere Port	52-26	Bradford
13/06	Long Eaton	37-40	Birmingham
24/05	Peterborough	52-26	Rye House
05/05	Rye House	36-42	Peterborough
27/05	Scunthorpe	44-34	Coatbridge
17/05	Stoke	51-27	Teesside
23/05	Teesside	32-45	Stoke
14/05	Weymouth	44-34	Boston
24/05	Workington	50-28	Berwick

Quarter-finals

Date	Team one	Score	Team two
01/07	Birmingham	48-30	Boston
14/07	Boston	39-39	Birmingham
02/08	Coatbridge	48-30	Stoke
14/07	Eastbourne	50-28	Workington
18/06	Ellesmere Port	40-38	Peterborough
21/06	Peterborough	46-31	Ellesmere Port
18/07	Stoke	40-38	Coatbridge
26/07	Workington	43-35	Eastbourne

Semi-finals

Date	Team one	Score	Team two
09/09	Birmingham	58-20	Peterborough
23/08	Coatbridge	48-29	Eastbourne
01/09	Eastbourne	56-21	Coatbridge
06/09	Peterborough	41-37	Birmingham

=== Final ===
First leg

20 October 1974

Eastbourne Eagles Paul Gachet 12 Martin Yeates 9 Neil Middleditch 8 Pete Jarman 7 Bobby McNeil 7 Mike Sampson 2 Trevor Geer 2	47 – 31	Birmingham Brummies Arthur Browning 11 Phil Herne 10 John Hart 4 George Major 4 Keith Anderson 1 Carl Askew 1 Ricky Day R/R

Arlington Stadium

Second leg

21 October 1974

Birmingham Brummies Phil Herne 12 Arthur Browning 11 George Major 10 John Hart 7 Keith Anderson 7 Ricky Day 2 Carl Askew 1	50 – 27	Eastbourne Eagles Pete Jarman 9 Neil Middleditch 8 Paul Gachet 7 Trevor Geer 2 Martin Yeates 1 Bobby McNeil 0 Mike Sampson 0

Perry Barr Stadium

Birmingham were declared Knockout Cup Champions, winning on aggregate 81–74.

== Leading final averages ==
	Rider	Nat	Team	C.M.A.
1	Phil Herne	(Australia)	Birmingham	10.48
2	Carl Glover	(England)	Boston	10.29
3	Arthur Browning	(England)	Birmingham	10.14
4	Mitch Graham	(England)	Workington	10.00
5	John Jackson	(England)	Crewe	9.95

== Riders' Championship ==
Carl Glover won the Rider's Championship, held at Wimbledon Stadium on 28 September.

Pos.	Rider	Pts	Total
1	(England) Carl Glover	2 3 3 3 2	13+3
2	(England) Ted Hubbard	3 3 3 2 2	13+2
3	(Australia) Phil Herne	3 1 2 3 3	12
4	(England) Mike Lanham	3 2 2 2 1	10
5	(England) Geoff Bouchard	1 2 2 3 2	10
6	(England) John Jackson	1 0 3 3 3	10
7	(England) Colin Meredith	2 2 2 2 1	9
8	(England) Mike Broadbanks	2 2 3 fx	7
9	(Wales) Graham Drury	0 0 1 2 3	6
10	(England) Brian Havelock (res)	1 3	4
11	(England) Bobby McNeil	1 3 fx	4
12	(Scotland) Ken McKinlay	1 3 fx	4
13	(New Zealand) Dave Gifford	2 1 0 0 0	3
14	(England) Brian Foote	0 1 1 1 0	3
15	(England) Tom Owen	1 1 f 1 r	3
16	(England) Bruce Forrester	3 0 f fx ex	2
17	(England) Bob Hughes (res)	1 1	1
18	(Scotland) Willie Templeton (res)	0 1 f ex 1	0
19	(England) Mitch Graham	0 ex	0

- f=fell, r-retired, ex=excluded, ef=engine failure

== Riders & final averages ==
Barrow

- Tom Owen 8.54
- Dave Baugh 8.46
- Terry Kelly 8.00
- Sid Sheldrick 7.77
- Paul O'Neal 7.37
- Joe Owen 7.36
- Chris Roynon 6.12
- Mick Sheldrick 3.40
- Graham Tattersall 2.74

Berwick

- Brian Havelock 7.70
- Willie Templeton 7.27
- Graham Jones 6.80
- Jim Wells 6.67
- Doug Templeton 6.59
- Denny Morter 6.00
- Alf Wells 5.84
- Colin Farquharson 5.67
- Dave Trownson 4.90
- Ian Wilson 3.76
- Robin Dixon 3.50

Birmingham

- Phil Herne 10.48
- Arthur Browning 10.14
- John Hart 8.99
- George Major 8.97
- Ricky Day 6.55
- Carl Askew 5.14
- Keith Anderson 5.02
- Alan Grahame 4.13

Boston

- Carl Glover 10.29
- Jim Ryman 8.07
- Russ Osborne 8.00
- David Gagen 7.15
- Rob Hollingworth 6.18
- Dave Piddock 5.89
- Les Glover 5.07
- Rob Mouncer 3.79
- Billy Burton 2.97

Bradford

- Alan Knapkin 9.33
- Tony Featherstone 8.66
- Colin Meredith 8.33
- Mick Fairbairn 5.98
- Mick Fishwick 5.63
- Eddie Argall 5.16
- Steve Wilcock 5.15
- Roger Austin 4.76
- Mick Fielding 4.74
- Dave Parkin 2.70

Canterbury

- Trevor Jones 8.84
- Ted Hubbard 8.13
- Dave Gooderham 7.28
- Roger Johns 6.93
- Barney Kennett 6.85
- Derek Cook 6.43
- Les Rumsey 6.38
- Graham Clifton 4.74
- Peter Murray 3.09
- Jimmy Squibb 3.08

Coatbridge

- Dave Gifford 8.82
- Brian Collins 8.66
- Robin Adlington 7.60
- Jimmy Gallacher 7.38
- Grahame Dawson 5.83
- John Wilson 5.15
- Eddie Argall 4.13
- Chris Quigley 4.00
- Mike Ferreira 3.33
- Jim Beresford 2.74

Crewe

- John Jackson 9.95
- Jack Millen 9.10
- Dave Morton 8.87
- Keith White 7.43
- Ian Cartwright 6.43
- Les Ott 6.06
- Cliff Anderson 5.72
- Wayne Forrest 4.59
- Mike Gardner 4.57
- Stuart Cope 2.91
- Paul Wells 2.12

Eastbourne

- Bobby McNeil 8.77
- Trevor Geer 8.46
- Paul Gachet 8.29
- Mike Sampson 7.79
- Neil Middleditch 7.72
- Pete Jarman 6.99
- Steve Weatherley 6.41
- Martin Yeates 6.26
- Eric Dugard 5.28

Ellesmere Port

- Graham Drury 9.31
- Colin Goad 8.32
- Steve Taylor 7.36
- Nigel Wasley 6.16
- Wayne Hughes 6.05
- Duncan Meredith 5.89
- Gerald Smitherman 5.20
- Nicky Allott 4.37
- Ken Stafford 3.60
- Steve Casey 2.71
- Ray Hassall 2.16

Long Eaton

- Geoff Bouchard 9.24
- Alan Molyneux 8.23
- Phil Bass 6.95
- Alan Witt 5.05
- Steve Finch 4.33
- James Bond 4.06
- Max Brown 3.90
- Dave Harvey 3.90
- Pip Austen 3.63
- Harry MacLean 2.97

Peterborough

- Mike Lanham 9.11
- Brian Clark 8.73
- Jack Walker 6.75
- Ken Matthews 6.31
- Roy Carter 6.29
- Steve Osborn 6.12
- Roy Sizmore 5.74
- Peter Thompson 4.85
- Eric Dugard 4.44
- Chris Drewett 4.14

Rye House

- Brian Foote 7.93
- Steve Clarke 7.45
- Clive Hitch 6.88
- Trevor Barnwell 6.71
- George Barclay 5.58
- Peter Moore 5.39
- Bob Young 5.31
- John Gibbons 5.29
- Bob Cooper 4.78
- Pete Wigley 4.36

Scunthorpe

- Tony Childs 8.82
- Ken McKinlay 8.13
- Doug Underwood 6.56
- Andy Sims 6.54
- Keith Evans 6.07
- Dingle Brown 6.04
- Chris Emery 6.03
- Jack Bywater 5.60
- Tim Swales 4.50
- Chris Doyle 4.14
- Roger Pascall 2.86

Stoke

- Mike Broadbank 9.37
- Geoff Pusey 7.46
- Brian Woodward 7.18
- Steve Bastable 6.00
- Alan Bridgett 5.97
- Steve Holden 5.87
- Nigel Wasley 5.64
- Andy Cusworth 5.22
- Mick Newton 2.67

Sunderland

- Jim Wells 7.92
- Brian Havelock 7.23
- Tim Swales 6.77
- George Barclay 6.43
- Russ Dent 6.15
- Andy Meldrum 6.07
- Dennis Gavros 5.00
- Brian Johnson 4.00
- Vic Harding 3.71
- John Robson 2.82
- Derek Fell 2.50

Teesside

- Bruce Forrester 9.39
- Dave Durham 7.87
- Pete Reading 7.73
- Roger Wright 7.12
- Russ Hodgson 6.42
- Alan Emerson 5.14
- Tony Swales 3.63
- Merv Salt 3.29

Weymouth

- Kelvin Mullarkey 7.19
- Bob Hughes 6.77
- Steve Lomas 6.36
- Nigel Couzens 5.64
- Geoff Swindells 5.51
- Clark Facey 4.88
- Russell Foot 4.88
- Glyn Facey 4.80
- Brian Paddington 4.28
- Mark Sawyers 3.47

Workington

- Mitch Graham 10.00
- Malcolm MacKay 8.77
- Taffy Owen 8.42
- Alan Cowland 7.28
- Steve Watson 5.54
- Darryl Stobbart 4.98
- Bernie Hornby 4.14
- Steve Lawson 1.68

== See also ==
- List of United Kingdom Speedway League Champions
- Knockout Cup (speedway)
