= Wigan (speedway) =

Motorcycle speedway team

Wigan speedway

Club information
- Track address: Poolstock Stadium (1947–1948); Woodhouse Lane Stadium (1952–1953)
- Country: England
- Founded: 1947
- Closed: 1960
- League: National League Division 2

Wigan were a British speedway team that existed from 1947 to 1960. They were based at the Poolstock Stadium, Park Street, Poolstock and the Woodhouse Lane Stadium, Woodhouse Lane in Wigan.

They were known as the Wigan Panthers and the Wigan Warriors at various times.

== History ==
An application to the Speedway Control Board on 1 January 1947 for a speedway licence was successful and speedway was to expected to start in Wigan at Springfield Park. However, it soon transpired that it was to be at Poolstock Stadium and a dirt track was constructed around the greyhound racing track in quick time. The first home fixture, which was an individual meeting was held on 4 April 1947.

The team known as Wigan Warriors first competed in the 1947 Speedway National League Division Two, finishing seventh from eight teams. The team lasted barely one season with the riders transferring to Fleetwood to become the Fleetwood Flyers during April of the 1948 Speedway National League Division Two season, after just three away fixtures had been completed. Jack Gordon and Norman Hargreaves were the mainstays of the team which also featured Reg Lambourne, Cyril Cooper and Jack Winstanley.

In 1952 and 1953, a team known as Wigan Panthers raced at the Woodhouse Lane Stadium, but there was no league racing.

In 1960, the Wigan Warriors returned to Poolstock for open meetings during the summer months.

== Season summary ==
Year and league	Position	Notes
1947 Speedway National League Division Two	7th	Warriors
1948 Speedway National League Division Two	N/A	Warriors withdrew, replaced by Fleetwood Flyers
