= Cleveland Park Stadium =

Racing venue in England

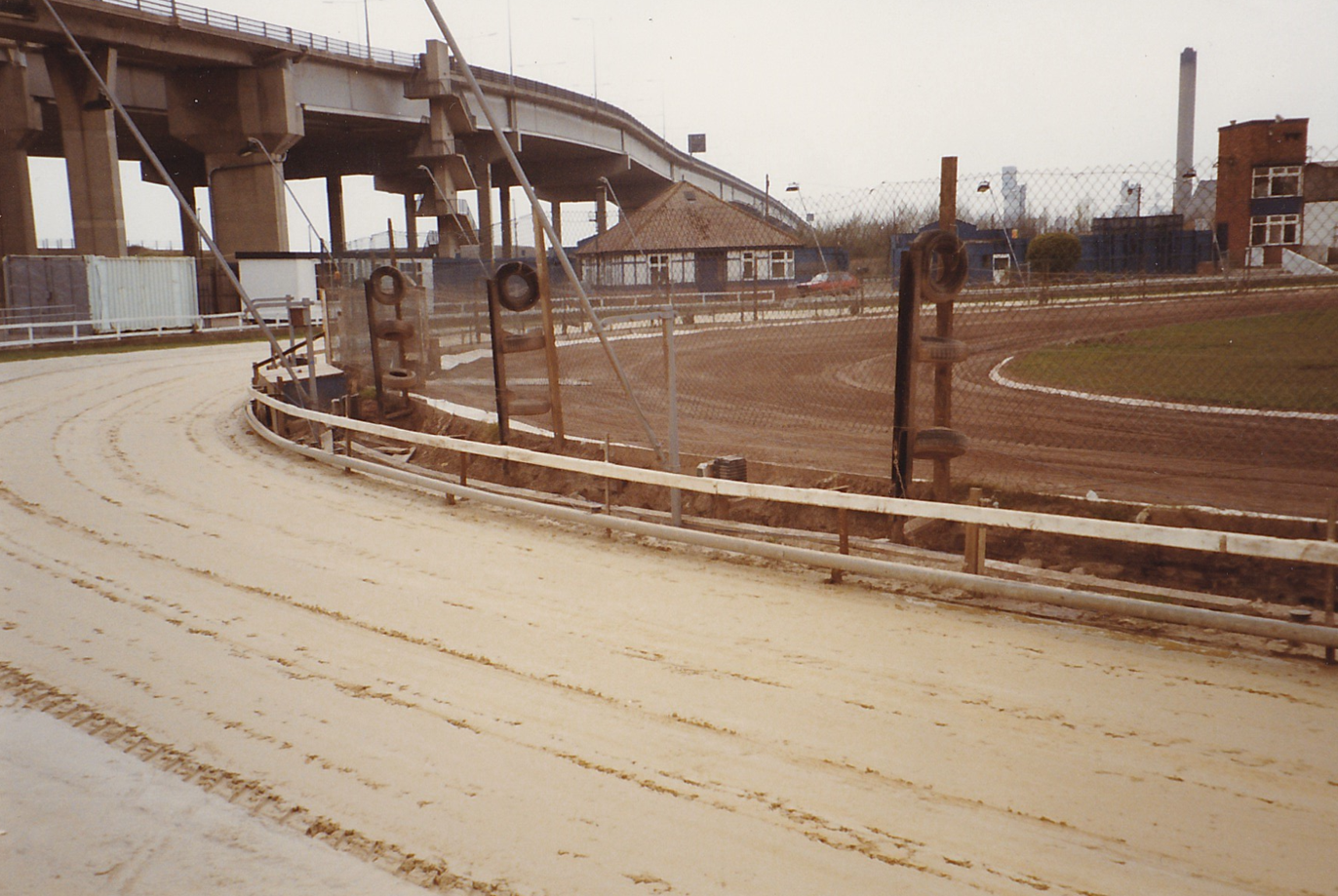
- Circa.1970
- Interactive map of Cleveland Park Stadium
- Location: Middlesbrough, England
- Coordinates: 54°33′54″N 1°15′52″W

Construction
- Opened: 1928
- Closed: 1996

Cleveland Park Stadium was a greyhound racing and speedway stadium in Middlesbrough, North Yorkshire. It was built in 1928 and demolished in 1996.

== Origins ==
The idea of constructing a greyhound track in Middlesbrough came from Jack French who formed the National Greyhounds Middlesbrough Ltd. An eleven-acre site of former allotments in the Ayresome Ward, south of the River Tees and directly south of the Tees Marshalling Yard Railways and Stockton Road Tramway was chosen in 1928.

Originally the greyhound track had a circumference of 412 yards (377 m) and used a Mono-Rail type hare system running on a bogie which would later be replaced by an 'Inside Sumner' in 1939.

== Opening ==
The first greyhound meeting was held on 19 May 1928, watched by an attendance of eight thousand. A greyhound called Just Alone won the first race over 500 yards with the meeting consisting of seven races including two hurdle races and two handicap races. Middlesbrough Speedway followed three months later on 23 August 1928. The first track star was a greyhound called Brilliant Gambler, who set multiple track records throughout 1928 and 1929.

== Pre war history ==
The stadium facilities included two enclosures both featuring members clubs, one on the home straight and another slightly larger one on the back straight. Between the first and second bends was the hare control and between the third and fourth bends was the tote control which opened later in 1936. The stewards box and offices were situated on the home straight before the first bend.

A greyhound called Cheerful Chinaman won his first race on 20 August 1928 and went on to win 138 races from 452 outings when retiring on 21 November 1934. (A record believed to be still held today). The first track champion was a greyhound called Brilliant Gambler an Irish import that held the track records over 470 and 650 yards.

In 1938 all greyhounds were owned by the company after privately owned greyhounds were phased out, a move designed to foil doping. Distances changed to 288, 500, 518 and 700 yards.

== Post war history ==
Totalisator turnover during 1946 equated to £656,386 and one year later a new Electro-Mechanical tote was installed.

In 1956 there was a triple dead heat between Law Maker, Red Bay and Spinach Lad in 30.36 over 518 yards, an excellent grading achievement by Racing Manager R W Burns. The feat was repeated three years later when Quarry Tanist, Sandboy & Skip Me crossed the line together on 12 July 1959. In 1961 the track hosted a heat of the BBC Television Trophy shown live on Sportsview.

Throughout the 1960s the raced on Wednesday and Saturday nights and the resident trainers were Harry Gendle and K Nelson. The principal event was the Cleveland Stayers Championship and amenities on offer to the public included four bars and three cafes.

Vic Abbott replaced R W Burns as Racing Manager and the decision was taken in 1967 to sand the bends replacing the grass. The entire track would be converted to sand in 1984. During 1978 Harry Gendle retired after 46 years as a trainer at the track.

The only major race win by a Middlesbrough greyhound came in 1982 when Irish Grand National champion Face The Mutt won the Scottish Grand National for trainer Reece before moving to Norah McEllistrim at Wimbledon Stadium the same year and completed the triple crown of by winning the English Grand National.

In 1985 a serious arson attack destroyed the main stand and Ross Searle took over from Vic Abbott. In 1987 the track hosted auctions for the first time but during 1990 the track suffered an exodus of trainers because a revamped Sunderland had opened.

== Closure ==
In September 1996 the site was sold and the track was demolished to make way for the Goals soccer centre football pitches and the Macmillan City Technology College extension (part of the Macmillan Academy).

== Track records ==
Extended content

=== Pre-Metric ===
Yards	Greyhound	Time (sec)	Date
240	Fred Thornley	14.82	14 October 1929
270	Hettys Heir	15.92	17 June 1936
280	Stockbroker	17.50	1 June 1938
288	Blue Dusty	16.61	28 September 1957
288	Lincolns Inn	16.18	24 July 1971
306	Sandys Peach	17.61	29 September 1956
470	Brilliant Gambler	27.59	1928
470	Brilliant Gambler	27.29	21 August 1929
475	Sea Knott	28.30	18 June 1928
475	Brilliant Gambler	28.21	18 June 1928
475	Brilliant Gambler	28.19	23 June 1928
475	Brilliant Gambler	28.01	1 August 1928
480	Daegrease	28.80	29 May 1937
500	Shanes Al	28.61	7 June 1965
500	Idle Sailor	28.48	24 September 1966
500	Malaria	27.96	6 July 1968
518	Boy Mack		30 August 1946
518	Dusky Guy	30.27	26 October 1946
518	Blue Dusty	29.70	9 July 1956
650	Brilliant Gambler	39.45	8 September 1928
650	Pennine Jock	38.81	2 July 1930
682	Stocky	41.71	19 July 1933
692	Captain Horner	43.88	13 August 1938
700	Maylin Justice	41.83	30 July 1962
700	Claudyne	39.75	11 July 1965
718	Sound Hero	42.96	23 June 1962
880	Student Life	52.23	26 April 1961
882	Kirkleatham Leader	57.46	6 May 1935
470 H	Corah Hill	28.61	2 July 1930
475 H	Burnebe	30.15	13 June 1928
650 H	Cleveland Lass	42.54	22 February 1930

=== Post-Metric ===
Metres	Greyhound	Time (sec)	Date
266	Mattie Jo	16.28	1989
266	Well Keeper	16.24	29 July 1991
266	Seaview	15.97	1 August 1994
282	Kipplings Fox	17.55	1976
450m	Move Along Myna	27.84	20 April 1988
450m	Ballynaught Five	27.82	1989
462m	Swift Linnet	28.36	4 March 1989
462m	Jubilee Rocco	28.18	18 June 1993
478m	Lazy John	29.59	1978
478m	Lucky Saint	29.25	11 June 1983
640m	Grace Line	40.79	4 October 1989
640m	Keiberwood Bob	40.26	23 September 1994
774m	Hollands Sand	50.91	12 November 1993
824m	Desert Tan	55.11	17 February 1988
836m	Dampit Pride	54.94	25 July 1990
847m	Ryehope Dawn	55.90	1987
