= Fleetwood Flyers =

English motorcycle speedway team

Club information
- Track address: Highbury Stadium; Park Avenue; Fleetwood; Lancashire
- Country: England
- Founded: 1948
- Closed: 1952
- League: National League Division Two

Club facts
- Colours: green and red
- Track record time: 63.8
- Track record date: 1948-06-29
- Track record holder: Dick Geary

Fleetwood Flyers were a speedway team in Fleetwood, England, that operated from 1948 until 1952. Home meetings were raced at Highbury Stadium, Park Avenue in Fleetwood.

== History ==
In March 1948, following a meeting of the Corporation Finance and General Purposes Committee, permission was granted to the speedway promoter Mr. J.Waxman to allow the football ground to be used for speedway. A quickfire 19 days effort resulted in the concrete wall surrounding the pitch being demolished and a 30 feet wide track being constructed. Flaxman paid £225 rent per year.

The Flyers first competed in the National League Division Two in 1948, when they replaced Wigan Warriors after three matches. The first home match was a fixture against Edinburgh Monarchs.

They competed in Division Two in 1949, 1950 and 1951.

In 1952, they dropped out of the league and operated on an open licence riding challenge matches as Fleetwood Knights.

== Season summary ==
Year and league	Position	Notes
1948 Speedway National League Division Two	8th	replaced Wigan Warriors
1949 Speedway National League Division Two	9th	
1950 Speedway National League Division Two	15th	
1951 Speedway National League Division Two	14th	

=== 1948 season ===
Extended content

The first three meetings of the season were run by Wigan Warriors. As the Warriors they lost two and won one meetings. The first meeting at home was against Edinburgh Monarchs on 14 April, which they lost 35–49 with Norman Hargreaves top scoring on ten points. The track had been made available for practice on the afternoon prior to the meeting and the Monarchs took advantage of the session whilst the home riders did not. The track record race time was set as 70.4 seconds in the second heat by Jack Gordon. The track record was broken at the next home meeting in at 68.8 seconds set by Sheffield Tigers rider Jack Bibby. The Flyers first victory came in an away meeting over Birmingham Brummies on 24 April. On 27 April Norwich Stars rider Syd Littlewood set a new track record of 66.8 seconds. In the 44–39 win over Newcastle Diamonds on 18 May the track record was again broken, by Wilf Plant at 65.4 seconds. As results gradually improved the track record was broken in the 48–36 win over Glasgow Tigers on 1 June, set by Dick Geary at 65.0 seconds. Bristol Bulldogs rider Fred Tuck broke the track record again on 15 June in a cup meeting at 64.8 seconds and he broke it again a week later in a National Trophy meeting at 64.6 seconds. On 29 June Flyers rider Dick Geary broke the track record for a second time, setting a new record of 63.8 seconds.

League results

- Norwich Stars 45 Wigan Warriors 37 (Firs Stadium, Norwich 27 March)
- Newcastle Diamonds 38 Wigan Warriors 45 (Brough Park Stadium, Newcastle-Upon-Tyne 5 April)
- Glasgow Tigers 49 Wigan Warriors 34 (White City Stadium, Glasgow 7 April)
- Fleetwood Flyers 35 Edinburgh Monarchs 49 (Highbury Stadium, Fleetwood 14 April)
- Sheffield Tigers 48 Fleetwood Flyers 36 (Owlerton Stadium, Sheffield 15 April)
- Fleetwood Flyers 39 Sheffield Tigers 49 (Highbury Stadium, Fleetwood 20 April)
- Birmingham Brummies 40 Fleetwood Flyers 44 (Alexander Stadium, Birmingham 24 April)
- Fleetwood Flyers 31 Norwich Stars 53 (Highbury Stadium, Fleetwood 27 April)
- Middlesbrough Bears 63 Fleetwood Flyers 19 (Cleveland Park, Middlesbrough 29 April)
- Fleetwood Flyers 38 Birmingham Brummies 46 (Highbury Stadium, Fleetwood 4 May)
- Edinburgh Monarchs 45 Fleetwood Flyers 39 (Old Meadowbank, Edinburgh 8 May)
- Fleetwood Flyers 41 Bristol Bulldogs 42 (Highbury Stadium, Fleetwood 11 May)
- Fleetwood Flyers 37 Middlesbrough Bears 47 (Highbury Stadium, Fleetwood 17 May)
- Fleetwood Flyers 44 Newcastle Diamonds 39 (Highbury Stadium, Fleetwood 18 May)
- Norwich Stars 53 Fleetwood Flyers 30 (Firs Stadium, Norwich 22 May)
- Fleetwood Flyers 48 Middlesbrough Bears 36 (Highbury Stadium, Fleetwood 25 May)
- Fleetwood Flyers 48 Glasgow Tigers 36 (Highbury Stadium, Fleetwood 1 June)
- Bristol Bulldogs 49 Fleetwood Flyers 35 (Knowle Stadium, Bristol 4 June)
- Edinburgh Monarchs 42 Fleetwood Flyers 41 (Old Meadowbank, Edinburgh 3 July)
- Fleetwood Flyers 40 Glasgow Tigers 44 (Highbury Stadium, Fleetwood 3 August)
- Sheffield Tigers 54 Fleetwood Flyers 30 (Owlerton Stadium, Sheffield 12 August)
- Birmingham Brummies 62 Fleetwood Flyers 22 (Alexander Stadium, Birmingham 28 August)
- Middlesbrough Bears 51 Fleetwood Flyers 33 (Cleveland Park, Middlesbrough 2 September)
- Fleetwood Flyers 53 Sheffield Tigers 31 (Highbury Stadium, Fleetwood 7 September)
- Fleetwood Flyers 51 Bristol Bulldogs 3 (Highbury Stadium, Fleetwood 14 September)
- Fleetwood Flyers 40 Birmingham Brummies 44 (Highbury Stadium, Fleetwood 21 September)
- Fleetwood Flyers 53 Norwich Stars 31 (Highbury Stadium, Fleetwood 28 September)
- Newcastle Diamonds 43 Fleetwood Flyers 41 (Brough Park Stadium, Newcastle 4 October)
- Fleetwood Flyers 50 Edinburgh Monarchs 34 (Highbury Stadium, Fleetwood 5 October)
- Glasgow Tigers 42 Wigan Warriors 42 (White City Stadium, Glasgow 6 October)
- Fleetwood Flyers 52 Newcastle Diamonds 32 (Highbury Stadium, Fleetwood 12 October)
- Bristol Bulldogs 57 Fleetwood Flyers 27 (Knowle Stadium, Bristol 15 October)

Cup results

- Newcastle Diamonds 54 Fleetwood Flyers 42 (Brough Park Stadium, Newcastle 19 April)
- Norwich Stars 47 Wigan Warriors 57 (Firs Stadium, Norwich 1 May)
- Sheffield Tigers 55 Fleetwood Flyers 41 (Owlerton Stadium, Sheffield 20 May)
- Birmingham Brummies 51 Fleetwood Flyers 45 (Alexander Stadium, Birmingham 29 May)
- Fleetwood Flyers 47 Birmingham Brummies 49 (Highbury Stadium, Fleetwood 8 June)
- Fleetwood Flyers 51 Bristol Bulldogs 45 (Highbury Stadium, Fleetwood 15 June)
- Fleetwood Flyers 62 Glasgow Tigers 34 (Highbury Stadium, Fleetwood 29 June)
- Fleetwood Flyers 54 Edinburgh Monarchs 42 (Highbury Stadium, Fleetwood 20 July)
- Fleetwood Flyers 59 Newcastle Diamonds 37 (Highbury Stadium, Fleetwood 27 July)
- Glasgow Tigers 68 Wigan Warriors 28 (White City Stadium, Glasgow 28 July)
- Fleetwood Flyers 69 Middlesbrough Bears 27 (Highbury Stadium, Fleetwood 10 August)
- Edinburgh Monarchs 58 Fleetwood Flyers 38 (Old Meadowbank, Edinburgh 14 August)
- Fleetwood Flyers 56 Sheffield Tigers 40 (Highbury Stadium, Fleetwood 17 August)
- Middlesbrough Bears 51 Fleetwood Flyers 45 (Cleveland Park, Middlesbrough 19 August)
- Fleetwood Flyers 55 Norwich Stars 41 (Highbury Stadium, Fleetwood 24 August)
- Bristol Bulldogs 56 Fleetwood Flyers 40 (Knowle Stadium, Bristol 17 September)

National Trophy results

- Bristol Bulldogs 65 Fleetwood Flyers 43 (Knowle Stadium, Bristol 18 June)
- Fleetwood Flyers 69 Bristol Bulldogs 39 (Highbury Stadium, Fleetwood 22 June)
- Fleetwood Flyers 39 Birmingham Brummies 59 (Highbury Stadium, Fleetwood 13 July)
- Birmingham Brummies 75 Fleetwood Flyers 33 (Alexander Stadium, Birmingham 19 July)

Challenge meetings

- Fleetwood Flyers 52 Stoke Potters 31 (Highbury Stadium, Fleetwood 2 August)
- Fleetwood Flyers 48 Sheffield Tigers 36 (Highbury Stadium, Fleetwood 16 October)

=== 1949 season ===
Extended content
- Friday 1 April 1949 Knowle Bristol Bulldogs 61 Fleetwood Flyers 22 (NLD2)
- Monday 11 April 1949 Brough Newcastle Magpies 45 Fleetwood Flyers 39 (NLD2)
- Wednesday 13 April 1949 Highbury Fleetwood Flyers 47 Newcastle Magpies 37 (NLD2) SH
- Saturday 16 April 1949 Dudley Wood Cradley Heath Heathens 50 Fleetwood Flyers 34 (NLD2)
- Wednesday 20 April 1949 Highbury Fleetwood Flyers 48 Southampton Saints 36 (NLD2) T Res RaceSH
- Wednesday 27 April 1949 Highbury Fleetwood Flyers 54 Walthamstow Wolves 30 (NLD2) SH
- Saturday 30 April 1949 Old Meadowbank, Edinburgh Monarchs 45 Fleetwood Flyers 39 (NLD2)
- Wednesday 4 May 1949 Highbury Fleetwood Flyers 46 Cradley Heath Heathens 38 (NLD2) SH
- Friday 6 May 1949 Knowle Bristol Bulldogs 67 Fleetwood Flyers 17 (NLD2)
- Monday 9 May 1949 Stanley Liverpool and Plymouth 58 Fleetwood Flyers 26 (Ch)
- Wednesday 11 May 1949 Highbury Fleetwood Flyers 46 Bristol Bulldogs 38 (NLD2) SH
- Tuesday 17 May 1949 Bannister Court Southampton Saints 41 Fleetwood Flyers 42 (NLD2)
- Wednesday 18 May 1949 Highbury Fleetwood Northern Trophy T Ht18
- Monday 23 May 1949 London Walthamstow Wolves 42 Fleetwood Flyers 42 (NLD2)
- Wednesday 25 May 1949 Highbury Fleetwood Flyers 53 Coventry Bees 29 (NLD2) T Novices R
- Thursday 26 May 1949 Owlerton Sheffield Tigers 60 Fleetwood Flyers 24 (NLD2)
- Saturday 28 May 1949 Brandon Coventry Bees 35 Fleetwood Flyers 49 (NLD2)
- Wednesday 1 June 1949 Highbury Fleetwood Flyers 51 Sheffield Tigers 33 (NLD2) SH
- Wednesday 8 June 1949 Highbury Fleetwood Flyers 57 Edinburgh Monarchs 27 (NLD2)
- Wednesday 15 June 1949 Highbury Fleetwood Flyers 64 Cradley Heath Heathens 18 (NLD2) SH
- Saturday 18 June 1949 Sun Street Stoke Potters 56 Fleetwood Flyers 52 (NT)
- Wednesday 22 June 1949 Highbury Fleetwood Flyers 69 Stoke Potters 38 (NT) SH
- Wednesday 29 June 1949 Highbury Fleetwood Flyers 61 Edinburgh Monarchs 44 (NT)
- Saturday 2 July 1949 Old MeadowbankEdinburgh Monarchs 57 Fleetwood Flyers 51(NT)
- Wednesday 6 July 1949 Fleetwood World Championship Round T Run Off
- Thursday 7 July 1949 Owlerton Sheffield Tigers 43 Fleetwood Flyers 40 (NLD2)
- Friday 9 July 1949 Knowle Bristol Bulldogs 73 Fleetwood Flyers 35 (NT)
- Tuesday 12 July 1949 Glasgow Ashfield Giants 45 Fleetwood Flyers 39 (NLD2)
- Wednesday 13 July 1949 Highbury Fleetwood Flyers 46 Bristol Bulldogs 60 (NT) SH
- Saturday 16 July 1949 Brandon Coventry Bees 46 Fleetwood Flyers 38 (NLD2)
- Wednesday 20 July 1949 Highbury Fleetwood Flyers V Bristol Bulldogs (NLD2) Postponed
- Monday 25 July 1949 Brough Park, Newcastle Magpies 49 Fleetwood Flyers 35 (NLD2)
- Wednesday 27 July 1949 Highbury Fleetwood Flyers 46 Sheffield Tigers 38 (NLD2) SH
- Monday 1 August 1949 Highbury Fleetwood Flyers 38 Glasgow Tigers 46 (NLD2)
- Tuesday 2 August 1949 Glasgow Ashfield Giants 45 Fleetwood Flyers 38 (NLD2)
- Wednesday 3 August 1949 Highbury Fleetwood Flyers 30 Norwich Stars 53 (NLD2)
- Saturday 6 August 1949 Firs Norwich Stars 58 Fleetwood Flyers 26 (NLD2)
- Monday 8 August 1949 Highbury Fleetwood Flyers 39 Bristol Bulldogs 44 (NLD2)
- Wednesday 10 August 1949 White City Glasgow Tigers 68 Fleetwood Flyers 16 (NLD2)
- Saturday 13 August 1949 Highbury Fleetwood Flyers 45 Ashfield Giants 39 (NLD2)
- Wednesday 17 August 1949 Highbury Fleetwood Flyers 41 Walthamstow 43 (NLD2) SH
- Friday 19 August 1949 Dudley Wood Cradley Heath Heathens 44 Fleetwood Flyers 40 (NLD2)
- Wednesday 24 August 1949 Highbury Fleetwood Flyers 49 Southampton Saints 35 (NLD2)
- Saturday 27 August 1949 Firs Norwich Stars 48 Fleetwood Flyers 34 (NLD2)
- Wednesday 31 August 1949 Highbury Fleetwood Flyers 35 Norwich Stars 49 (NLD2) SH
- Wednesday 7 September 1949 Highbury Fleetwood Flyers 63 Coventry Bees 31 (NLD2) TSH Fin
- Saturday 10 September 1949 Old Meadowbank, Edinburgh Monarchs 58 Fleetwood Flyers 26 (NLD2)
- Wednesday 14 September 1949 Highbury Fleetwood Flyers 53 Newcastle Magpies 31 (NLD2) SH
- Saturday 17 September 1949 Odsal Halifax Dukes 57 Fleetwood Flyers 27 (C)
- Monday 19 September 1949 London Walthamstow Wolves 62 Fleetwood Flyers 21 (NLD2)
- Tuesday 20 September 1949 Bannister Court Southampton Saints 51 Fleetwood Flyers 33 (NLD2)
- Wednesday 21 September 1949 Highbury Fleetwood Flyers 35 Edinburgh Monarchs 49 (NLD2) SH
- Monday 26 September 1949 County Ground, Exeter Falcons 7 Fleetwood Flyers 17 (SHC)
- Wednesday 28 September 1949 Highbury Fleetwood Flyers 56 Glasgow Tigers 28 (NLD2) SH
- Saturday 1 October 1949 Highbury Fleetwood Flyers 38 Halifax Dukes 46 (Ch)
- Wednesday 5 October 1949 White City Stadium, Glasgow Tigers 51 Fleetwood Flyers 33 (NLD2)
- Wednesday 12 October 1949 Highbury Fleetwood Flyers 52 Ashfield Giants 30 (NLD2) SH

=== 1950 season ===
Extended content
- Monday 10 April 1950 Brough Newcastle Diamonds 54 Fleetwood Flyers 30 (NS)
- Wednesday 12 April 1950 White City Glasgow Tigers 55 Fleetwood Flyers 28 (NS)
- Saturday 15 April 1950 Sun Street Stoke Potters 49 Fleetwood Flyers 34 (NS)
- Saturday 22 April 1950 Old Meadowbank, Edinburgh Monarchs 58 Fleetwood Flyers 26 (NS)
- Saturday 29 April 1950 Highbury Fleetwood Flyers v Newcastle Diamonds (NS) Cancelled / Abandoned
- Tuesday 2 May 1950 Saracen Park, Ashfield Giants 58 Fleetwood Flyers 25 (NS)
- Wednesday 3 May 1950 Highbury Fleetwood Flyers 43 Ashfield Giants 39 (NS)
- Wednesday 10 May 1950 Highbury Fleetwood Flyers 41 Sheffield Tars 42 (NS)
- Friday 12 May 1950 The Shay Halifax Dukes 56 Fleetwood Flyers 28 (NS)
- Saturday 13 May 1950 Highbury Fleetwood Flyers 33 Halifax Dukes 49 (NS)
- Monday 15 May 1950 Stanley Liverpool Chads 47 Fleetwood Flyers 37 (Cha)
- Wednesday 17 May 1950 Highbury Fleetwood Flyers 38 Stoke Potters 46 (NS)
- Friday 19 May 1950 Owlerton Sheffield Tars 52 Fleetwood Flyers 32 (NS)
- Saturday 20 May 1950 Highbury Fleetwood Flyers 47 Glasgow Tigers 37 (NS)
- Wednesday 24 May 1950 Highbury Fleetwood Flyers 43 Edinburgh Monarchs 41 (NS)
- Saturday 27 May 1950 Firs Norwich Stars 63 Fleetwood Flyers 44 (NT)
- Wednesday 31 May 1950 Highbury Fleetwood Flyers 48 Norwich Stars 59 (NT)
- Wednesday 7 June 1950 Highbury Fleetwood Flyers 39 Halifax Dukes 45 (NLD2)
- Wednesday 14 June 1950 Highbury Fleetwood Flyers 52 Newcastle Diamonds 32 (NS)
- Wednesday 21 June 1950 Highbury Fleetwood Flyers 57 Yarmouth Bloaters 27 (NLD2)
- Saturday 24 June 1950 Sun Street Stoke Potters 38 Fleetwood Flyers 46 (NLD2)
- Wednesday 28 June 1950 Highbury Avenue Fleetwood Four Team Challenge
- Saturday 1 July 1950 Old Meadowbank, Edinburgh Monarchs 50 Fleetwood Flyers 33 (NLD2)
- Wednesday 5 July 1950 Fleetwood World Championship Round
- Friday 7 July 1950 Blackbird Road Leicester Hunters 47 Fleetwood Flyers 37 (Ch)
- Wednesday 12 July 1950 Highbury Fleetwood Flyers 40 Walthamstow Wolves 44 (NLD2)
- Saturday 15 July 1950 Highbury Fleetwood Flyers v Glasgow Tigers (NLD2) Rained Off
- Monday 17 July 1950 London Walthamstow Wolves 54 Fleetwood Flyers 30 (NLD2)
- Wednesday 19 July 1950 Highbury Fleetwood Flyers 37 Ashfield Giants 46 (NLD2)
- Saturday 22 July 1950 Highbury Fleetwood Flyers 40 Glasgow Tigers 44 (NLD2)
- Wednesday 26 July 1950 Highbury Fleetwood Flyers 58 Leicester Hunters 26 (Ch)
- Saturday 29 July 1950 Highbury Fleetwood Flyers 46 Plymouth Devils 38 (NLD2)
- Wednesday 2 August 1950 Highbury Fleetwood Flyers 34 Coventry Bees 50 (NLD2)
- Saturday 5 August 1950 Highbury Fleetwood Flyers 55 Liverpool Chads 41 (Ch)
- Wednesday 9 August 1950 Highbury Fleetwood Flyers 50 Stoke Potters 34 (NLD2)
- Saturday 12 August 1950 Highbury Fleetwood Flyers 54 Newcastle Diamonds 30 (NLD2)
- Wednesday 16 August 1950 Highbury Fleetwood Flyers 47 Norwich Stars 37 (NLD2)
- Saturday 19 August 1950 Firs Norwich Stars 69 Fleetwood Flyers 15 (NLD2)
- Tuesday 22 August 1950 Caister Road Yarmouth Bloaters 59 Fleetwood Flyers 25 (NLD2)
- Saturday 26 August 1950 Highbury Fleetwood Flyers 39 Southampton Saints 45 (NLD2)
- Thursday 31 August 1950 Pennycross Plymouth Devils 57 Fleetwood Flyers 27 (NLD2)
- Saturday 2 September 1950 Brandon Coventry Bees 59 Fleetwood Flyers 25 (NLD2)
- Wednesday 6 September 1950 Highbury Fleetwood Flyers v Cradley Heath Heathens (NLD2) Rained Off
- Friday 8 September 1950 Highbury Fleetwood Flyers 37 Cradley Heath Heathens 47 (NLD2)
- Monday 11 September 1950 Dudley Wood Cradley Heath Heathens 58 Fleetwood Flyers 26 (NLD2)
- Wednesday 13 September 1950 Highbury Fleetwood Flyers 54 SheffieldTigers 30 (NLD2)
- Friday 15 September 1950 Bannister Court Southampton Saints 56 Fleetwood 28 (NLD2)
- Tuesday 19 September 1950 Saracen Park, Ashfield Giants 35 Fleetwood Flyers 49 (NLD2)
- Wednesday 20 September 1950 Highbury Fleetwood Flyers 42 Edinburgh Monarchs 42 (NLD2)
- Wednesday 27 September 1950 White City Glasgow Tigers 56 Fleetwood Flyers 28 (NLD2)
- Monday 2 October 1950 Stanley Liverpool Chads 55 Fleetwood Flyers 40 (Ch)
- Wednesday 4 October 1950 The Shay, Halifax Dukes 51 Fleetwood Flyers 33 (NLD2)
- Thursday 5 October 1950 Owlerton Sheffield Tigers 68 Fleetwood Flyers 18 (NLD2)
- Monday 9 October 1950 Brough Park, Newcastle Diamonds 60 Fleetwood Flyers 23 (NLD2)

=== 1951 season ===
Extended content
- Friday 23 March 1951 Brough Newcastle Diamonds 58 Fleetwood Flyers 26 (North Trophy)
- Wednesday 28 March 1951 White City Glasgow Tigers 56 Fleetwood Flyers 28 (North Trophy)
- Tuesday 3 April 1951 Saracen Park, Ashfield Giants 53 Fleetwood Flyers 31 (North Shield)
- Friday 6 April 1951 The Stadium Lanarkshire Eagles 46 Fleetwood Flyers 38 (North Shield)
- Wednesday 11 April 1951 Highbury Fleetwood Flyers 43 Glasgow Ashfield 41 (NorthT)
- Saturday 14 April 1951 Old Meadowbank, Edinburgh Monarchs 59 Fleetwood Flyers 25 (NorthSh)
- Wednesday 18 April 1951Highbury Fleetwood Flyers 45 Newcastle Diamonds 39 (NT)
- Wednesday 25 April 1951 Highbury Fleetwood Flyers 29 Edinburgh Monarchs 55 (NS)
- Saturday 28 April 1951 Highbury Fleetwood Flyers 35 Glasgow Tigers 49 (NT)
- Monday 30 April 1951 Brough Park, Newcastle Diamonds 71 Fleetwood Flyers 36 (NatT)
- Wednesday 2 May 1951 Highbury Fleetwood Fliers 39 Lanarkshire Eagles 44 (NT)
- Wednesday 9 May 1951 Highbury Fleetwood Flyers 64 Newcastle Diamonds 44 (NatT)
- Wednesday 16 May 1951 Highbury Fleetwood Flyers 48 Liverpool Chads 60 (LC)
- Saturday 19 May 1951 Old Meadowbank, Edinburgh Monarchs 58 Fleetwood Flyers 26 (NLD2)
- Wednesday 23 May 1951 Highbury Fleetwood Flyer 46 Leicester Hunters 38 (NLD2)
- Monday 28 May 1951 Stanley Liverpool Chads 51 Fleetwood Flyers 32 (NLD2)
- Wednesday 30 May 1951 Highbury Fleetwood Flyers 46 Cradley Heath 36 (NLD2)
- Wednesday 6 June 1951 Highburgh Fleetwood Flyers 38 Liverpool Chads 40 (NLD2)
- Saturday 9 June 1951 Brandon Coventry Bees 34 Fleetwood Flyers 29 (NLD2) (ABN)
- Wednesday 13 June 1951 Highbury Fleetwood Flyers 71 America 26 (C)
- Saturday 16 June 1951 Sun Street Stoke Potters 60 Fleetwood Flyers 23 (NLD2)
- Monday 18 June 1951 London Walthamstow Wolves 67 Fleetwood Flyers 16 (NLD2)
- Wednesday 20 June 1951 Highbury Fleetwood Flyers 65 Southampton Saints 43 (Ch)
- Saturday 23 June 1951 Brandon Coventry Bees 60 Fleetwood Flyers 23 (NLD2)
- Wednesday 27 June 1951 Highbury Fleetwood Flyers 42 Lanarkshire Eagles 42 (NLD2)
- Friday 29 June 1951 Highbury Fleetwood Flyers 45 Glasgow Tigers 39 (NLD2)
- Wednesday 4 July 1951 Highbury Fleetwood Flyers 56 Yarmouth Bloaters 28 (NLD2)
- Thursday 5 July 1951 Cowley Oxford Cheetahs 61 Fleetwood Flyers 23 (NLD2)
- Wednesday 11 July 1951 Fleetwood World Championship Qualifying Round
- Saturday 14 July 1951 Firs Norwich Stars 62 Fleetwood Flyers 22 (NLD2)
- Tuesday 17 July 1951 Caister Road Yarmouth Bloaters 63 Fleetwood Flyers 18 (NLD2)
- Wednesday 18 July 1951 Highbury Fleetwood Flyers 53 All-American Touring Team 54 (Ch)
- Wednesday 25 July 1951 Highbury Fleetwood Flyers 33 Norwich Stars 51 (NLD2)
- Friday 27 July 1951 The Shay, Halifax Dukes 60 Fleetwood Flyers 24 (NLD2)
- Saturday 28 July 1951 Highbury Fleetwood Flyers 40 Halifax Dukes 44 (NLD2)
- Wednesday 1 August 1951 Highbury Fleetwood Flyers 41 Ashfield Giants 42 (NLD2)
- Monday 6 August 1951 Stanley Liverpool Chads 62 Fleetwood Flyers 45 (LC)
- Wednesday 8 August 1951 Highbury Fleetwood Flyers 52 Stoke Potters 31 (NLD2)
- Wednesday 15 August 1951 Highbury Fleetwood Flyers 44 Coventry Bees 40 (NLD2)
- Wednesday 22 August 1951 Highbury Fleetwood Flyers 49 Walthamstow Wolves 35 (NLD2)
- Friday 24 August 1951 Dudley Wood Cradley Heath 55 Fleetwood Flyers 29 (NLD2)
- Tuesday 28 August 1951 Saracen Park Ashfield Giants 19 Fleetwood Flyers 15 (NLD2)
- Wednesday 29 August 1951 Highbury Fleetwood Flyers 53 Odsal Tudors 54 (Ch)
- Friday 31 August 1951 The Stadium Lanarkshire Eagles 55 Fleetwood Fliers 29 (NLD2)
- Wednesday 5 September 1951 Highbury Fleetwood Flyers 36 Edinburgh Monarchs 48 (NLD2)
- Wednesday 12 September 1951 Highbury Fleetwood Flyers 53 Oxford Cheetahs 31 (NLD2)
- Monday 17 September 1951 Brough Park Newcastle Diamonds 42 Fleetwood Flyers 42 (NLD2)
- Wednesday 19 September 1951 Fleetwood Wilf Jay's Eight 44 Norman Hargreaves Eight 40 (Ch)
- Friday 21 September 1951 Blackbird Road Leicester Hunters 57 Fleetwood Flyers 27 (NLD2)
- Tuesday 25 September 1951 Saracen Park Ashfield Giants 54 Fleetwood Flyers 30 (NLD2)
- Wednesday 26 September 1951 Highbury Fleetwood Flyers 45 Newcastle Diamonds 38 (NLD2)
- Wednesday 3 October 1951 White City Glasgow Tigers 65 Fleetwood Flyers 19 (NLD2)

=== 1952 season ===
Extended content

In 1952 a number of open meetings were held with the team renamed the Fleetwood Knights.

- Wednesday 30 April 1952 Fleetwood Knights 43 Liverpool Chads 40 (Ch)
- Wednesday 7 May 1952 Fleetwood Knights 61 Stoke Potters 22
- Wednesday 21 May 1952 Fleetwood Knights 44 Leicester Hunters 40 (Ch)
- Wednesday28 May 1952 Fleetwood Knights 44 Coventry Bees 40 (WT)
- Wednesday 11 June 1952 Fleetwood Knights 50 Yarmouth Bloaters 34 (Ch)
- Wednesday 18 June 1952 Fleetwood Knights 56 Wolverhampton Wasps 28 (CH)
- Wednesday 25 June 1952 Fleetwood Knights 49 Ashfield Giants 35 (CH)
- Wednesday 9 July 1952 Fleetwood Championship
- Wednesday 16 July 1952 Fleetwood Knights 52 Cardiff Dragons 32 (CH)
- Wednesday 30 July 1952 Individual Championship
- Wednesday 6 August 1952 Best Pairs
- Wednesday 13 August 1952 Highbury Individual Championship Final
- Wednesday 20 August 1952 Fleetwood Knights 50 All Star Team 34 (Ch)
- Wednesday 27 August 1952 Fleetwood Knights 43 Liverpool Chads 41 (CH)
- Wednesday 2 September 1952 Best Pairs Meeting Details
- Wednesday 9 September 1952 Best Pairs (Rained Off?)

== Notable riders ==
The most notable rider who rode for the Flyers was Peter Craven who rode in one meeting in 1951.

=== Most appearances ===
The riders who made the most appearances for the Flyers were –

- Norman Hargreaves – 107 meetings (1948 – 28, 1949 – 27, 1950 – 24, 1951 – 28)
- Don Potter – 71 meetings (1949 – 19, 1950 – 24, 1951 – 28)
- Wilf Plant – 67 meetings (1948 – 23, 1949 – 20, 1950 – 24)
- Alf Parker – 52 meetings (1950 – 24, 1951 – 28)
- Ron Hart – 51 meetings (1948 – 28, 1949 – 14, 1950 – 2, 1952 – 7)
- Dick Geary – 44 meetings (1948 – 27, 1950 – 17)
- Wilf Jay – 43 meetings (1951 – 28, 1952 – 15)
- Jeff Crawford – 42 meetings (1951 – 27, 1952 – 15)
- Ernie Appleby – 39 meetings (1948 – 15, 1949 – 18, 1951 – 6)
- Ray Harker – 38 meetings (1951 – 26, 1952 – 12)
- Frank Malouf – 34 meetings (1948 – 1, 1949 – 28, 1950 – 2, 1951 – 1)
- Reg Lambourne – 28 meetings (1948–28)
- George Newton – 28 meetings (1949 – 27, 1950 – 1)
- Angus McGuire – 24 meetings (1950 – 3, 1951 – 21)
- Jack Gordon – 23 meetings (1948–23)
- Graham Williams – 21 meetings (1950–21)
- Geoff Culshaw – 20 meetings (1950 – 19, 1952 – 1)

== Highbury stadium ==
For many years a feature of the Highbury stadium was the 'setback' on the west side of the ground where part of the speedway track used to be. Both the main stand and the long covered standing area known as the Scratching Shed were set back from the pitch by a large gap, where there was formerly one corner of the track. This was the legacy of the speedway years.

In 2008 when a new West Stand was built, it was constructed over the set back area, close to the pitch. To construct the stand, the builders had to clear about 5,000 tonnes of cinder and ash still left over from the speedway track.
