= Brian Havelock =

British speedway rider (1942–2025)

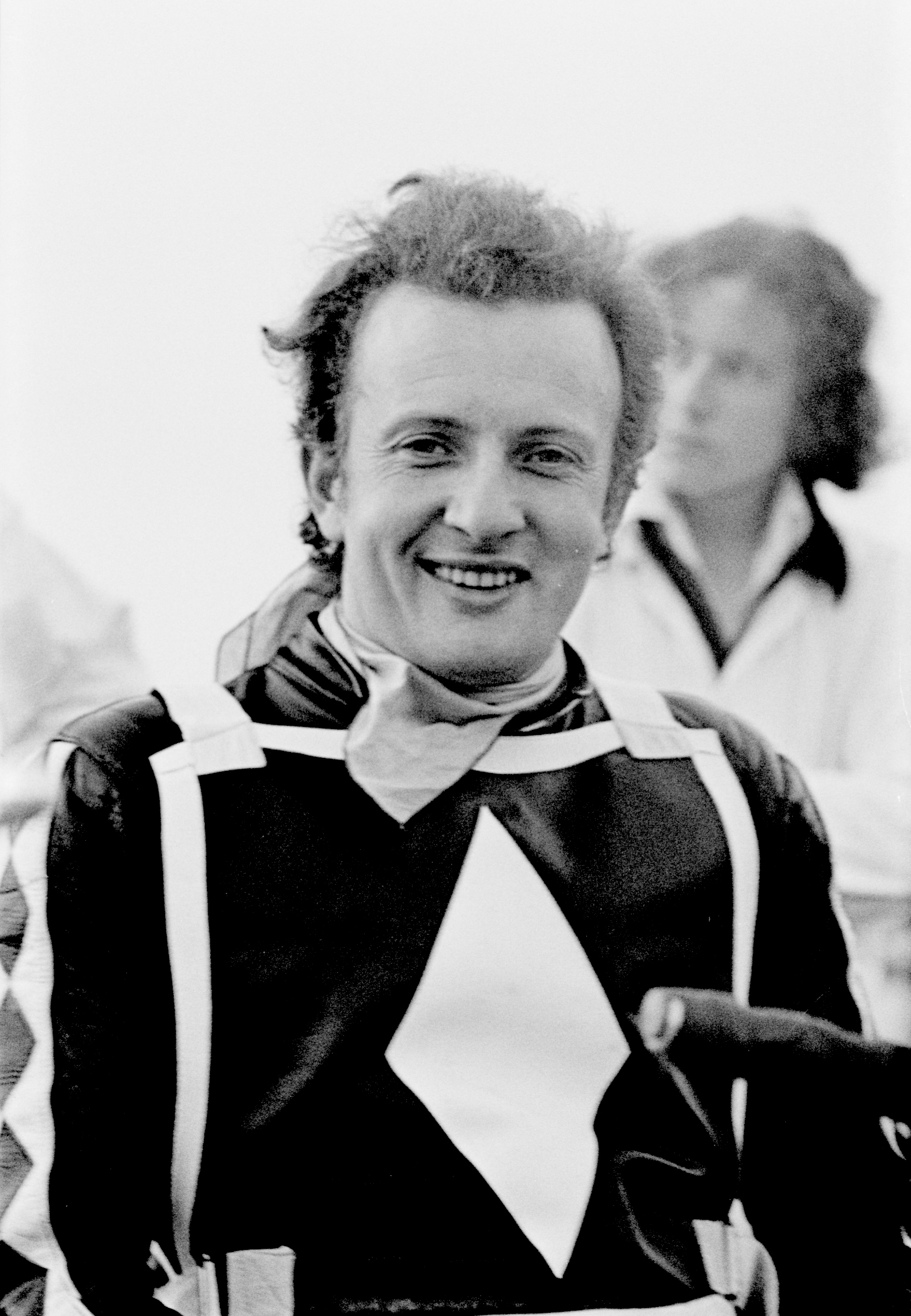
- Born: 9 May 1942; Yarm, England
- Died: 3 December 2025 (aged 83)
- Nationality: British (English)

Career history
- 1972: Teesside Teessiders
- 1973, 1974: Berwick Bandits
- 1973–1974: Sunderland Stars/Gladiators
- 1975–1976: Newcastle Diamonds
- 1975–1976: Hull Vikings
- 1976–1979: Workington Comets
- 1976: Exeter Falcons
- 1980–81, 1983: Middlesbrough Tigers
- 1982: Stoke Potters

Team honours
- 1975: National League Pairs Winner
- 1981: National League Champion

Robert Brian Havelock (9 May 1942 – 3 December 2025) was a British motorcycle speedway rider and the promoter of the Redcar Bears.

== Background ==
Havelock was born on 9 May 1942. He was married to Marjorie, with whom he had two children. His son Gary was the 1992 World Champion. He enjoyed competition fishing.

Havelock died on 3 December 2025, at the age of 83.

== Career ==
Havelock began his British leagues career with Teesside Teessiders in 1972 before joining Berwick Bandits, where he raced for two seasons from 1973 to 1974.

Havelock won the National League Pairs, partnering Tom Owen for the Newcastle Diamonds during the 1975 New National League season. He opened his own training school at Workington.

After his riding career, Havelock managed the Newcastle Diamonds.

After retiring from speedway, Havelock worked as a heating engineer.
