= Jack Hunt (speedway rider) =

New Zealand speedway rider (born 1922)

- Born: 6 April 1921; Auckland, New Zealand
- Died: 10 October 1991 (aged 70); Auckland, New Zealand

Career history

Great Britain
- 1947–1948: Newcastle Diamonds

Individual honours
- 1945, 1948: New Zealand champion

John Casement Hunt (6 April 1921 – 10 October 1991) was a New Zealand motorcycle speedway rider.

== Life and career ==
John Casement Hunt was born in Auckland on 6 April 1921, the son of Percy and Nellie Hunt. In 1945, he became champion of New Zealand after winning the New Zealand Solo Championship. He was one of the early overseas riders who travelled to the United Kingdom from New Zealand after World War II and started racing in the British leagues during the 1947 Speedway National League Division Two, when riding for the Newcastle Diamonds.

Hunt then went on to win a second New Zealand Championship in 1948 before returning to ride for Newcastle the same season. During the 1948 Speedway National League Division Two season, he topped the Newcastle team's averages, despite his season ending early after a serious accident in which he suffered a fractured shoulder and jaw.

Hunt died in Auckland on 10 October 1991, at the age of 70.
