= Arthur Browning (speedway rider) =

British speedway rider

- Born: 22 September 1944 (age 82); Birmingham, England
- Nationality: British (English)

Career history
- 1972–1976, 1981: Birmingham Brummies
- 1977–1980: Scunthorpe Saints/Stags
- 1979: Sheffield Tigers
- 1980: Wolverhampton Wolves
- 1981–1982: Stoke Potters

Team honours
- 1974, 1975: British League Division Two Champion
- 1974: British League Division Two KO Cup Winner

Arthur Kenneth Browning (born 22 September 1944) is a former speedway rider from England.

== Speedway career ==
Browning raced indoor speedway in 1972 before joining the Birmingham Brummies. He rode in the top two tiers of British Speedway from 1972 to 1982, riding for various clubs.

Browning was instrumental in helping the Brummies to win two league titles during the 1974 British League Division Two season and 1975 New National League season and he became the club's captain.
