= Rusty Hodgson =

British speedway rider

- Born: 29 March 1981 (age 45); Hutton Rudby, England
- Nationality: England

Career history
- 2006-: Redcar Bears

Team honours
- 2007: Young Shield Winner

Russell (Rust man) Frank Hodgson (born 29 March 1981) in Hutton Rudby, Cleveland, is a speedway rider in the United Kingdom, who rode with the Redcar Bears in the Premier League. He is the son of former Middlesbrough captain Russ Hodgson. His grandfather Frank Hodgson is also a former Bears captain.
