= Pete Reading =

British speedway rider

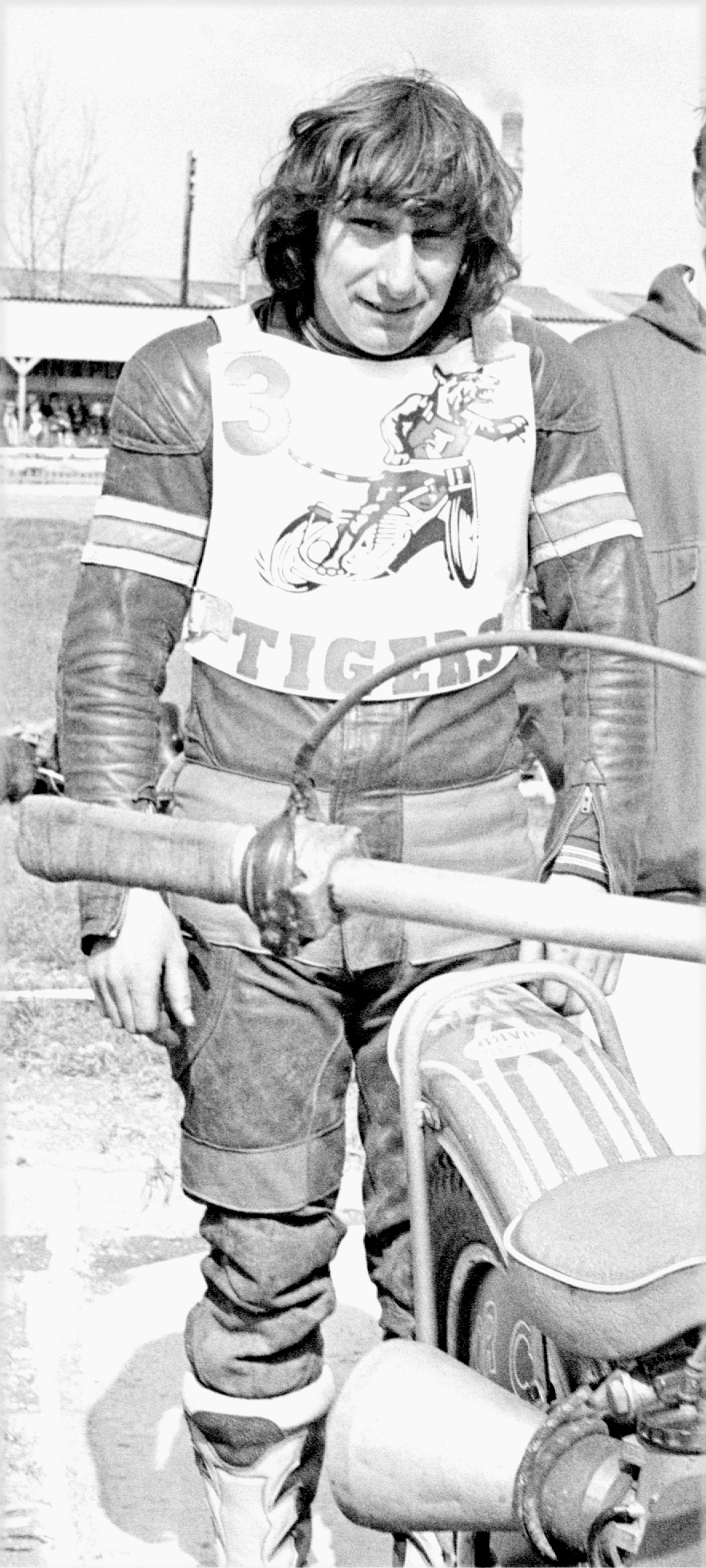
- Born: 10 April 1948 (age 78); Retford, Nottinghamshire, England
- Nationality: British (English)

Career history
- 1968–1980: Middlesbrough Teessiders/Bears; Teesside Teessiders/Tigers

Peter John Reading (born 10 April 1948) is a former motorcycle speedway rider from England.

== Biography ==
Reading, born in Retford, Nottinghamshire, was a member of the Leicester Cubs in early 1968 before he began his British leagues career riding for Middlesbrough Teessiders during the 1968 British League Division Two season season.

Reading became a Middlesbrough club legend because he spent 12 consecutive seasons with the club, earning a testimonial in 1977.

Reading steadily improved his average from 1968 through to 7.73 during the 1974 British League Division Two season, when the team were known as the Teesside Tigers.

Reading's last season was the 1980 National League season.
