= Highbury Stadium (Fleetwood) =

Football stadium in Fleetwood, Lancashire, England

- Highbury
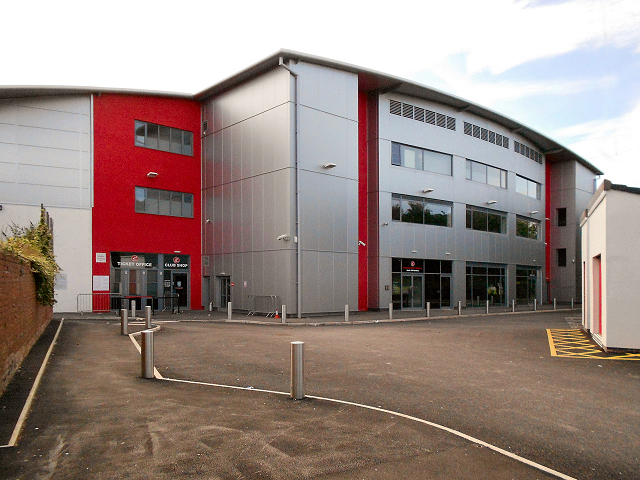

- Location within Fleetwood
- Full name: Highbury Stadium
- Location: Park Avenue, Fleetwood, FY7 6TX
- Coordinates: 53.9165°N 3.0247°W
- Owner: Wyre Borough Council
- Capacity: 5,327
- Surface: Grass
- Record attendance: 6,150 (13 November 1965)
- Field size: 115 × 71 yards (Google Earth)

Construction
- Built: 1939
- Opened: 1939
- Renovated: 2007–present

Tenants
- Fleetwood Town F.C. Fleetwood Flyers Blackpool F.C Reserves: 1939–present 1948–1952; 2006–2014

Highbury Stadium is a football stadium in Fleetwood, Lancashire, England, with Wyre Borough Council as the landlords. It is the home ground of Fleetwood Town and was also used for home matches by Blackpool F.C. reserves until 2014. As of the opening of the new Parkside Stand on 16 April 2011, the ground has a capacity of 5,327.

== History ==
The ground was opened in 1939, at the culmination of the most successful three-year period in the club's history, having completed a hat-trick of Lancashire Combination Cup wins. Until then the club had played on a ground next to the North Euston Hotel. It is situated on the south-west corner of the Memorial Park, just behind Highbury Avenue, after which it is named.

An unusual feature of the stadium was the 'setback' on the west side of the ground. Both the main stand and the long covered standing area known as the Scratching Shed were set back from the pitch by a large gap. This was the legacy of the short period from 1948 to 1952, when the stadium was used for speedway with Fleetwood Flyers riding in Division Two of the National Speedway league. In March 1948, following a meeting of the Corporation Finance and General Purposes Committee, permission was granted to the speedway promoter Mr. J.Waxman to allow the football ground to be used for speedway. A quickfire 19 days effort resulted in the concrete wall surrounding the pitch being demolished and a 30 feet wide track being constructed. Flaxman paid £225 rent per year. The team known as Fleetwood Flyers started the 1948 season as Wigan Warriors but moved to Fleetwood after racing a few away fixtures billed as Wigan. The Flyers raced in the National League Division Two from 1948 to 1951 without enjoying any great success. In 1952 the venue staged a number of open events with the team renamed the Fleetwood Knights. In 2008, when a new West Stand was built, it was constructed over the set back area, close to the pitch. To construct the stand, the builders had to clear about 5,000 tonnes of cinder and ash still left over from the speedway track.

== Ground redevelopment ==
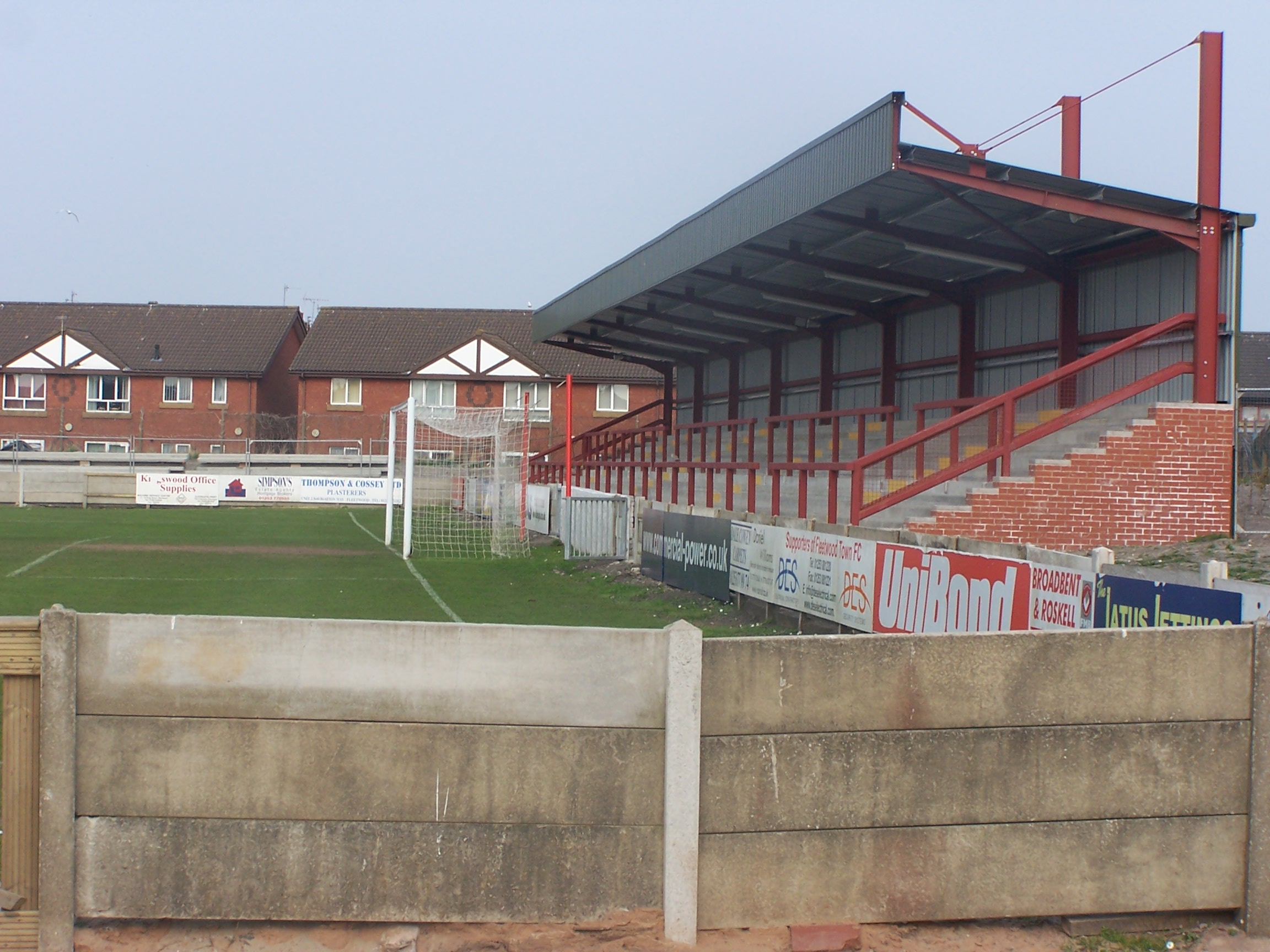
A view of the Percy Ronson Stand

In February 2007 the Percy Ronson Stand was opened. A £200,000-plus development, the stand is all terracing, and is the first new stand at the Highbury Stadium since 1939. Originally slated to hold 1,240, this figure was later revised downwards 50% by Lancashire County Council to the official capacity of 621. The stand, at the south side of the ground runs about two-thirds the width of the pitch.

On 31 July 2007, Fleetwood Town announced the "Stadium Development Plan," which includes:

1. The demolition of the Scratching Shed, to be replaced by a new west terrace similar to the Percy Ronson Stand, and also positioned close to the pitch.
2. Demolition of the current terrace at the north end of the ground with another terrace similar to the Percy Ronson Stand. However, this stand would run virtually the full width of the pitch, unlike the Percy Ronson Stand.
3. Demolition of the current social club on the east side of the ground, and development of a new 1,000 all-seater stand incorporating new changing rooms, four executive boxes, dining facilities, a supporters bar, a first floor cafeteria, an IT suite, ground floor community room, new club offices and a club shop.

The total cost of this three-staged final phase of the ground development was originally expected to be over £2M.

The plan was finalised in December 2007, with construction being planned in two phases.

- Phase One: This involves the first two items of the above plan - the demolition of the Scratching Shed, and the construction of the north and west terraces, together with temporary seating in the West Stand, car parking, and new Football League standard floodlights.
- Phase Two: This involves the third item in the above plan, the construction of the new Main Stand on the east side of the ground with social and changing facilities. The current main stand, a small construction set back from the pitch on the west side of the ground next to the Scratching Shed, will remain until the completion of Phase 2, as it holds the changing rooms.

Planning permission for Phase One was granted by Wyre Borough Council on 4 March 2008. Building work began on 28 April 2008 with clearing work behind the Park End Stand and continued with the demolition of the Scratching Shed, removal of the existing floodlights and clearance work on the main stand. On 23 August 2008 the new stands were opened for Fleetwood's inaugural Conference North match against Vauxhall Motors. The west stand, with its temporary seating, has a capacity of 550, and has been named the Highbury Stand. The stand at the Park end has a capacity of 1,473. It has been named the Memorial Stand to honour those who lost their lives in service of their country and the trawlermen lost at sea from the port of Fleetwood.

Phase Two, the construction of the new East Stand, was originally scheduled to begin during the close season in 2009, but was postponed by a year and the plans revised. A £125,000 project to re-lay the pitch and improve drainage was instead begun on 21 April 2009. This change was precipitated by a series of costly match postponements because of poor pitch conditions in 2008–09.

Plans for the new stand were revised and resubmitted in December 2009. The proposed capacity was increased to 2,000, which increased the ground capacity to over 5,500 and met the requirements of Football League membership. The stand, with a proposed price tag of £4 million, was designed with three levels of seating, five executive boxes (subsequently increased to seven) and a function suite. The ground floor is predominantly for use by club operations and was designed to house a community room and club shop. Planning permission was granted by Wyre Borough Council in March 2010, and development was set to begin during the 2010 close season. Construction began in May 2010, ahead of Fleetwood's Conference North Play-off Final against Alfreton Town, which they won 2–1. The stand, now named the Parkside Stand, was completed in spring 2011, and fully opened ahead of Fleetwood's 3–1 victory over Altrincham on 16 April 2011.
