= Phil Bass =

English motorcycle racer (born 1952)

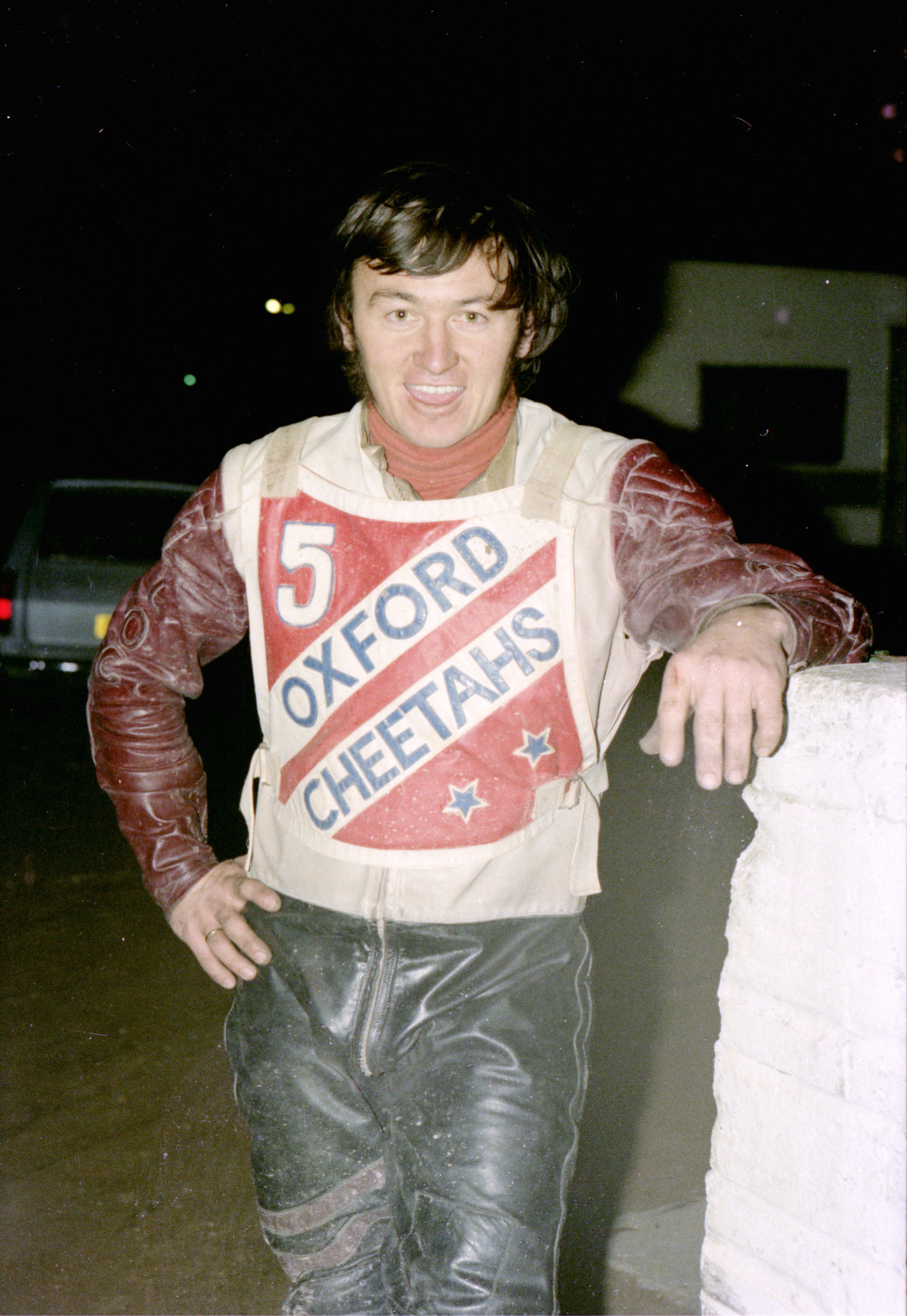
- Born: July 5, 1952; Banbury, England
- Died: 11 March 2006 (aged 53)

Career history
- 1972: Scunthorpe Saints
- 1973–1974: Long Eaton Rangers/Archers
- 1974, 1976: Cradley United
- 1975: Stoke Potters
- 1975: Sheffield Tigers
- 1975: Hull Vikings
- 1975–1976: Leicester Lions
- 1975–1976: Newport
- 1976: Oxford Cheetahs
- 1976: Swindon Robins
- 1977: Bristol Bulldogs
- 1978: Milton Keynes Knights

Phil Michael Robert Bass (17 November 1950 in Banbury, England - 11 March 2006) was a motorcycle speedway rider in National League (speedway) and British League.

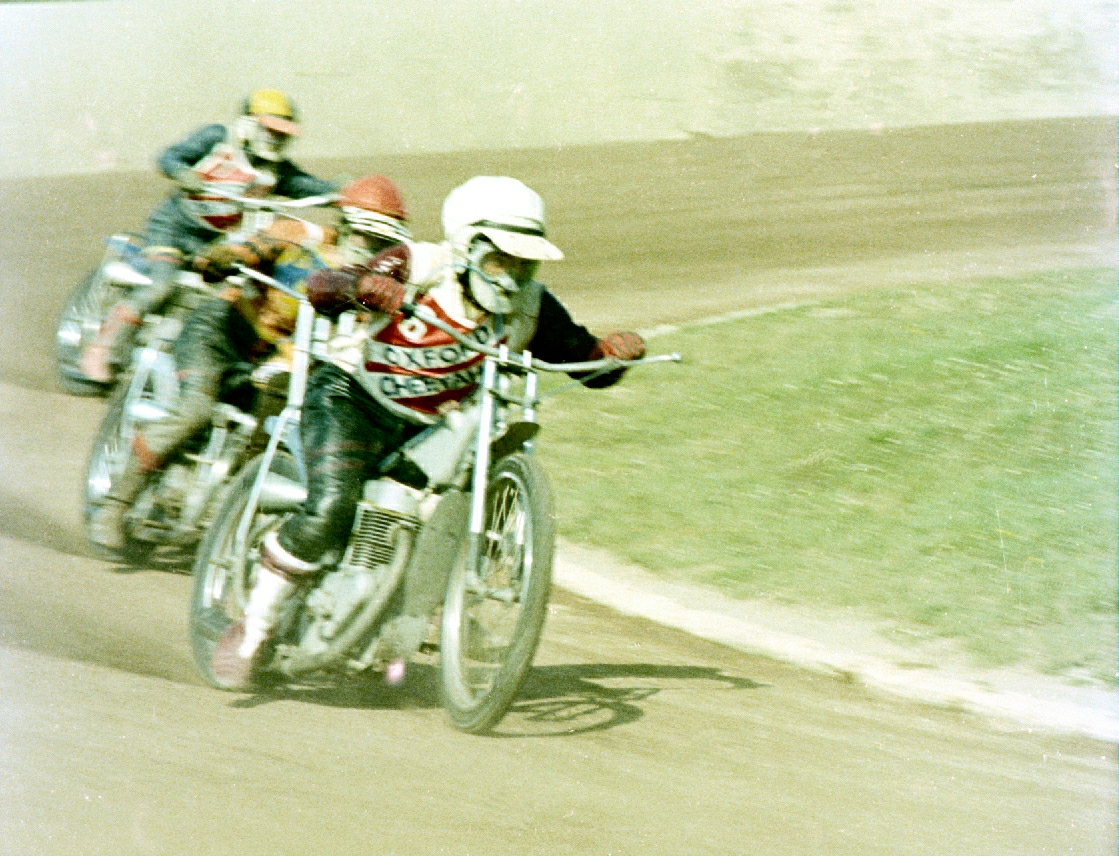
In Ht2, Phil Bass and Roy Sizmore sandwich Colin Ackroyd - Eastbourne 1976

== Career ==
Bass started his career with Scunthorpe Saints in 1972. He was the only rider to reach 200 points in what was a disappointing year for the Saints. His next two years were with Long Eaton Speedway The following year in 1973 he left Scunthorpe to ride for Long Eaton Rangers, where he would join his brother Steve Bass as a rider there.

Bass would have rides for British League teams but was never signed to ride as a full-time rider. As the 1975 season ended, Harry Bastable and Tony Allsopp, promoters at Stoke, moved the licence to Oxford for 1976, when Oxford Rebels moved to White City Stadium when it was feared the stadium would be demolished.
