= Woodhouse Lane Stadium =

Greyhound racing stadium in Wigan, England

- Interactive map of Woodhouse Lane Stadium
- Location: Woodhouse Lane, Wigan, England
- Coordinates: 53°33′19″N 2°39′20″W

Construction
- Opened: 17 March 1928
- Closed: April 1961

Woodhouse Lane Stadium was a greyhound racing and speedway stadium, located in Wigan.

== Origins ==
The stadium was constructed and opened in 1928, in only the second year of oval track greyhound racing in the United Kingdom. The stadium known as the Woodhouse Lane Stadium was located on the east side of Woodhouse Lane where it met Beech Hill Lane and the south side of Baytree Road. It was built on open farmland next door to the Springfield Park football ground.

== Opening ==
Racing started on 17 March 1928 and racing was independent (unaffiliated to a governing body). Wigan Borough F.C. resigned from the football league during the 1931–32 season. Shortly after Borough went out of business and a new club, Wigan Athletic F.C., was formed and continued to play their home games at Springfield Park. After lengthy negotiations, Wigan Athletic purchased the ground from the owners of the Woodhouse Lane Stadium for £2,800 with the proviso that greyhound racing never take place at Springfield Park.

The independent racing lasted for 33 years.

== Speedway ==
Speedway took place at the stadium in 1952 and 1953.

== Closure ==
The final meeting took place during April 1961 and became an athletics arena.
