= Wilf Plant =

- Born: 28 August 1914; Melton Mowbray, England
- Died: May 2001
- Nationality: British (English)

Career history
- 1937–1938: Wimbledon Dons
- 1937: Leicester Hounds
- 1938: Leeds Lions
- 1938: Nottingham
- 1939, 1946-1948: Middlesbrough Bears
- 1948–1950: Fleetwood Flyers
- 1951: Coventry Bees
- 1951–1952: Long Eaton Archers

Team honours
- 1947: National League Div 2 Champion
- 1946: Northern League Champion
- 1947: National Trophy (Div Two) Winner

Wilfred Graham Plant (28 August 1914 – May 2001) was a British motorcycle speedway rider.

== Career ==
Born in Melton Mowbray, Leicestershire, Plant gained his early racing experience in grasstrack. After practising from 1934 at Crayford, he started his speedway career at the Leicester Super track in 1936, winning the (unofficial) Midland Riders Championship, and joining New Cross in 1937. He moved team several times in the late 1930s, joining Wimbledon Dons later in 1937, Leeds in 1938, and Middlesbrough and then Edinburgh in 1939.

With the speedway leagues suspended during World War II, Plant worked in his garage in Asfordby repairing tractors. He returned to Middlesbrough in 1946, moving on to Fleetwood during the 1948 season, transferring for a record fee (at the time) of £1,000.

In 1949, Plant captained the unofficial British team that toured South Africa.

Plant signed for Coventry Bees, and towards the end of the 1951 season, joined Long Eaton Archers on loan, signing for the team in 1952, which was his last season, Plant retiring from the sport at the end of the season, although he did come out of retirement to ride in 'pirate' meetings at Long Eaton in 1954.

Plant's son Graham followed him into a career in speedway.
