= Middlesbrough Bears =

British motorcycle speedway team

Club information
- Track address: Cleveland Park Stadium; Stockton Road; Middlesbrough
- Country: England
- Founded: 1929
- Closed: 1996

Club facts
- Colours: Red and White Quarters
- Track size: 335 yards (306 m)

Major team honours
Northern League Champions	1946
NL tier 2 champions	1947, 1981
National Trophy Division 2	1947
National League Pairs	1980
National League Fours	1985, 1986

The Middlesbrough Bears were a British speedway team which operated under various names from 1929 until their closure in 1996.

== History ==
=== Origins and 1920s ===
Speedway arrived in Middlesbrough during 1928 when an attendance of 15,000 turned up for the inaugural meeting at the recently built Cleveland Park Stadium. The racing was arranged by Northern Speedways and a challenge match between Middlesbrough and Manchester resulted in 8,000 attending. The introduction was a success and the following season a company called Albion Auto racers of Stockport, Cheshire, took over and the team (not known as the Bears yet) were founder members of the 1929 Speedway English Dirt Track League, holding their first home fixture was on 16 May 1929 against Salford. However, on 12 July 1929, Dennis Atkinson suffered critical injuries following an accident at Cleveland Park, riding in a Golden Helmet meeting. He died the following day.

=== 1930s ===
The speedway licence was taken over by the Stadium's owners (the National Greyhounds, Middlesbrough) and although various meetings were held from 1930 to 1938, there was a complete absence of league racing until 1939.

Speedway returned to the stadium for the 1939 Speedway National League Division Two season. The club's general manager Vic Wieland signed star rider George Greenwood and nicknamed the team the Bears. Unfortunately events did not go to plan and Wieland withdrew the team citing poor attendances.

=== 1940s ===
The stadium staged a couple of open meetings in 1945, then saw competitive league speedway from 1946 until 1948. The Bears led by riders Frank Hodgson, Kid Curtis, Wilf Plant and Jack Hodgson won the Northern League in 1946 and then Division Two in 1947.

At the beginning of 1949 it was announced that the team would cease and the promotion would move to Newcastle to form the Newcastle Magpies, despite efforts from fans led by Jess Halliday, to keep the team in Middlesbrough.

=== 1960s ===
The Bears nickname was again used when the track re-opened in 1961 under the guidance of former rider turned promoter Reg Fearman, who was a multi track promoter and one of the brains behind setting up the Provincial League. Rider Eric Boothroyd led the team to a disappointing 10th-place finish. At the end of the 1964 season the Bears team moved to Halifax and the track staged challenge matches in 1965 and under former captain Eric Boothroyd's promotion in 1966 before folding. The track was used in the 1950s for amateur / club events and midget car racing.

The track opened again in 1968 but were renamed the Teesside Teessiders by promoter Ron Wilson who also ran Leicester although some record books incorrectly called them Middlesbrough Teessiders. Ron Wilson had changed the name to Teesside because he wanted it to be a new beginning and to take in the whole area not just Middlesbrough. They competed in the newly formed British League Division 2. Graham Plant won the 1968 British League Division Two Riders Championship.

=== 1970s ===
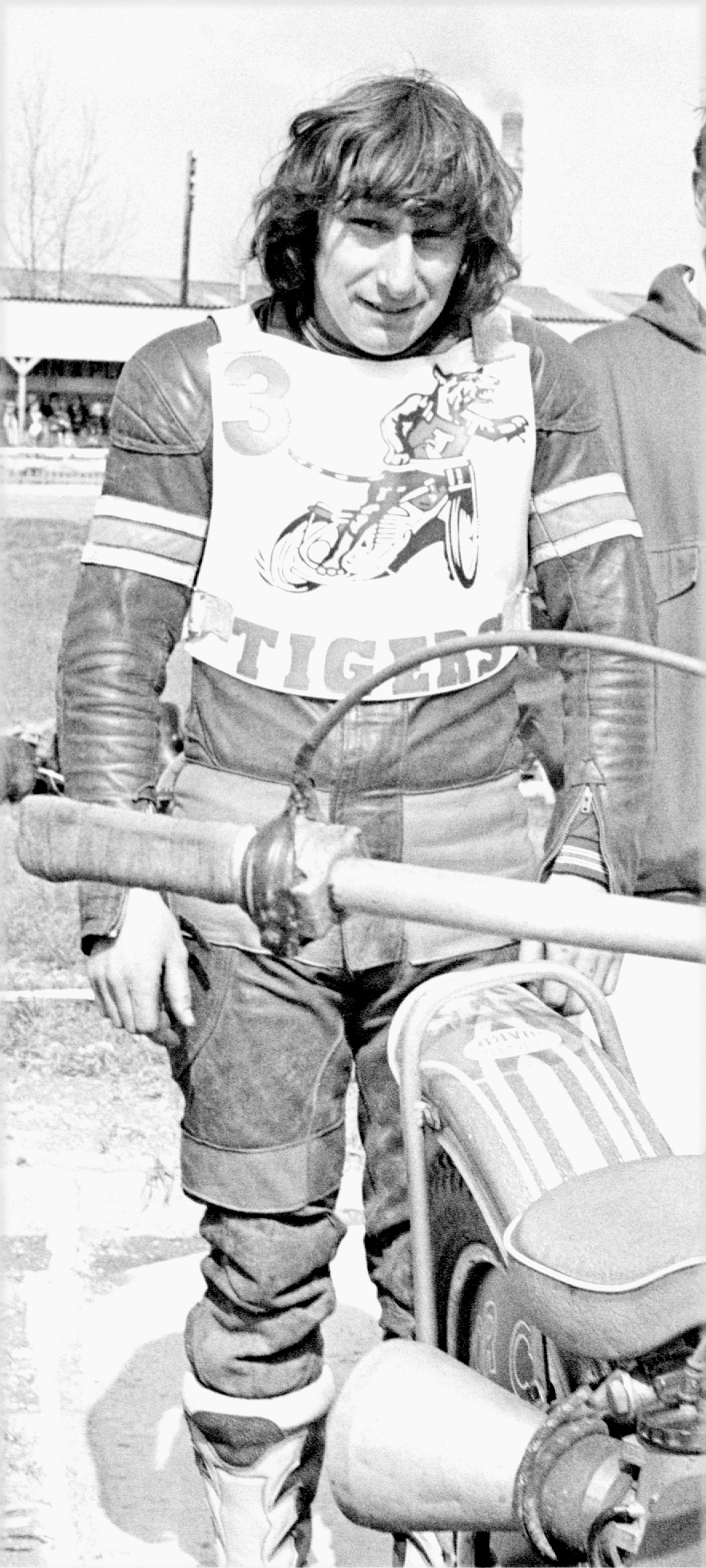
Pete Reading 1976

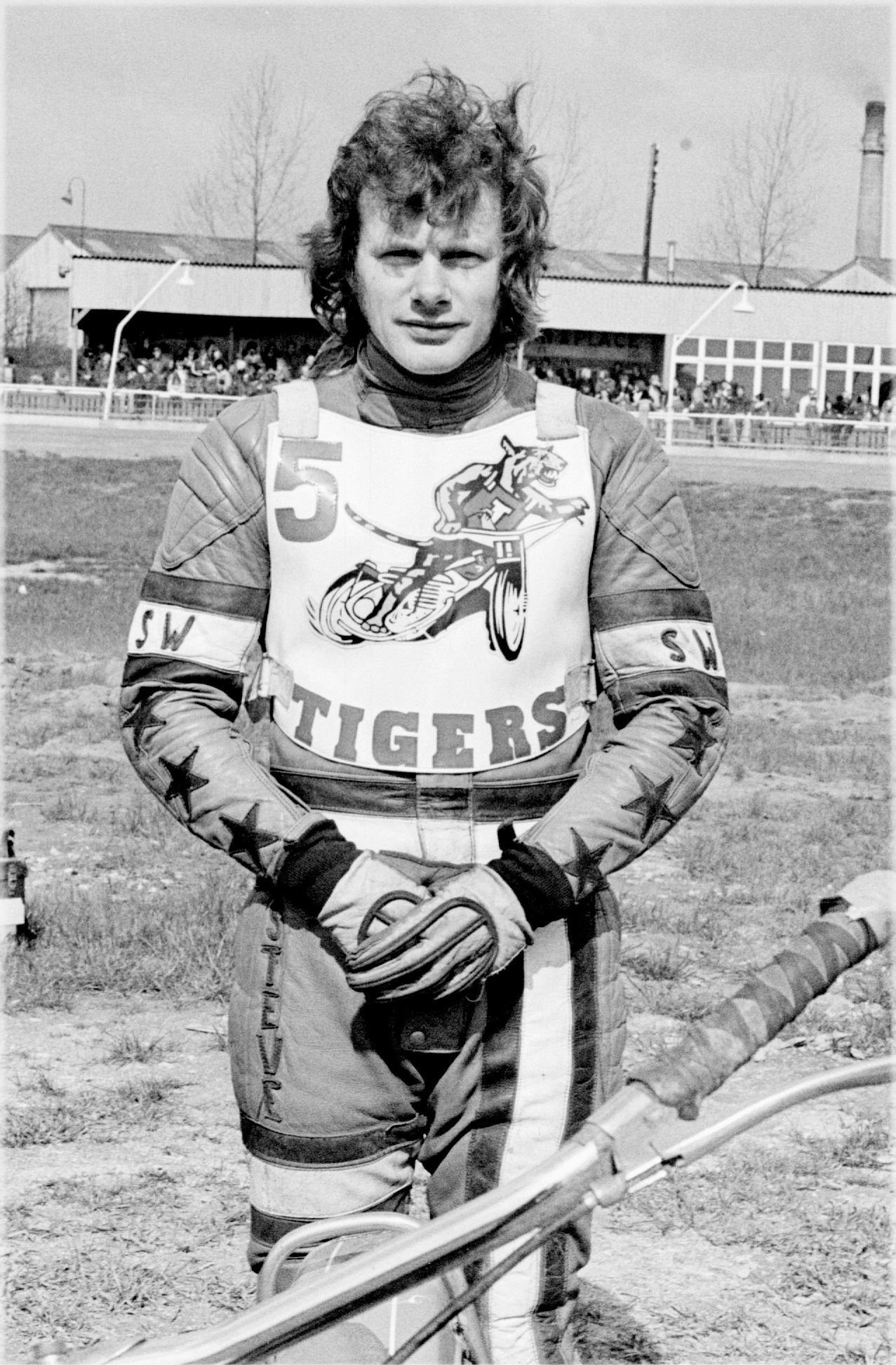
Steve Wilcock 1976

From 1970 to 1972, the Teesside Teessiders raced in division 2 but in 1973 they were again renamed, this time as the Teesside Tigers. The Tigers were members of the inaugural National League (as it was renamed in 1975). The following season was significant despite finishing last in the league because Steve Wilcock rode the first of his 15 seasons for the club and Pete Reading earned a testimonial in 1977. The team struggled for the remainder of the decade and in 1979 were renamed Middlesbrough Tigers, also a season which after 12 years turned out to be Ron Wilson's final one as he had opened up a new track at Milton Keynes in 1978.

=== 1980s ===
In 1980 Mark Courtney became British Junior Champion at Canterbury's Kingsmead Stadium, whilst he and Steve Wilcock won the British League Division 2 Riders Pairs Championship at Halifax the same season. The team were also losing Knockout Cup finalists to the homeless Berwick Bandits in a controversial last heat decider at Newcastle's Brough Park, with the match result dependent on the aggregate score. Success continued into 1981, with the Tigers becoming National League Champions.

The 1980s was a time that the team remained prominent finishing 3rd in both 1985 and 1986 and winning back to back National League Fours Championship in 1985 and 1986. The team saw riders the calibre of Gary Havelock, Martin Dixon, Mark Fiora and Geoff Pusey in support of Wilcock and Courtney. Wilcock earned a testimonial in 1985 and Pusey earned a testimonial in 1988.

There were individual success for Gary Havelock, when he became British Junior Champion at Stoke in 1985. However a major arson attack on the club's main stand in June 1985 at their Cleveland Park Stadium was a catastrophe. Initially crowds were healthy but as the 1980s progressed the club's fortunes on track dwindled, the stand was never replaced by the greyhound owners and there were yearly rumours that the land on which it stood was to be sold for redevelopment.

In 1989, the club reverted once again to the Middlesbrough Bears under a consortium led by promoter and former rider Tim Swales.

=== 1990s ===
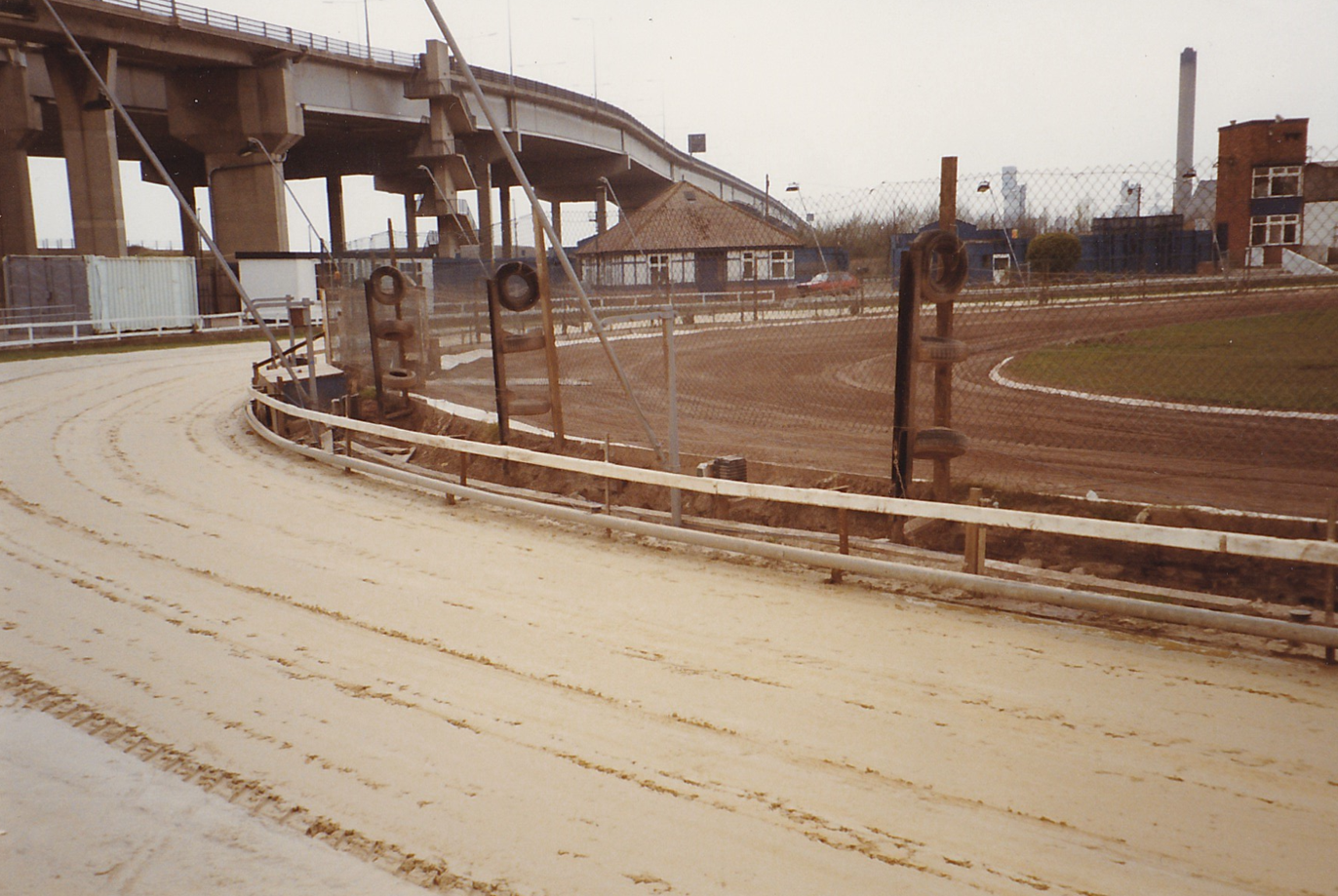
Cleveland Park

The 1990s started well with the Bears finishing runner-up to Poole Pirates in both the league and Knockout Cup but subsequent seasons failed to bring any silverware. Individual success was however achieved by Paul Bentley at Coventry in 1994, when he won the British League Division Two Riders Championship and Andy Howe also won the inaugural Academy League Riders Championship at Long Eaton that same season.

Permanent closure arrived in September 1996, when Cleveland Park was sold for re-development. The track was demolished to make way for the Goals soccer centre football pitches and the Macmillan City Technology College extension (part of the Macmillan Academy).

=== 2000s ===
In 2003 the Bears were revived, riding at Hull's Craven Park albeit racing in junior events against two teams from Hull and one from Scunthorpe. They competed in the Humber League and East Riding Cup and also raced at various 'away' tracks including Belle Vue (Manchester), Buxton, Edinburgh, Glasgow, King's Lynn, Newcastle, Oxford, Scunthorpe, Sheffield & Workington. After two years using Hull as a 'home' track they then relocated to Newcastle's Brough Park when the Newcastle Gems folded.

== Redcar Bears ==
In 2006 a new track opened at South Tees Motorsport Park South Bank, Middlesbrough on the site of an old steelworks and entered the Premier League under the name Redcar Bears.

== Notable riders ==
- (England) Paul Bentley
- (England) Eric Boocock
- (England) Kid Curtis
- (England) Martin Dixon
- (Australia) Mark Fiora
- (England) Bruce Forrester
- (England) George Greenwood
- (England) Gary Havelock
- (England) Frank Hodgson
- (England) Jack Hodgson
- (England) Tom Leadbitter
- (England) Jack Ormston
- (Australia) Shane Parker
- (England) Graham Plant
- (England) Wilf Plant
- (England) Geoff Pusey
- (England) Pete Reading
- (Australia) Steve Regeling
- (England) Pete Smith
- (England) Daz Sumner
- (England) Tim Swales
- (England) Steve Wilcock
- (England) Dave Younghusband

== Full season summary ==
Extended content

Year and league	Position	Notes
1929 Speedway English Dirt Track League	10th	
1939 Speedway National League	N/A	withdrew, results expunged
1946 Speedway Northern League	1st	champions
1947 Speedway National League Division Two	1st	champions & National Trophy (div 2)
1948 Speedway National League Division Two	3rd	
1961 Provincial Speedway League	10th	
1962 Provincial Speedway League	11th	
1963 Provincial Speedway League	11th	
1964 Provincial Speedway League	9th	
1968 British League Division Two season	3rd	Rode as the Teessiders
1969 British League Division Two season	9th	Rode as the Teessiders
1970 British League Division Two season	5th	Rode as Teesside Teessiders
1971 British League Division Two season	13th	Rode as Teesside Teessiders
1972 British League Division Two season	10th	Rode as Teesside Teessiders
1973 British League Division Two season	6th	Rode as Teesside Teessiders
1974 British League Division Two season	6th	Rode as Teesside Tigers
1975 New National League season	17th	Rode as Teesside Tigers
1976 National League season	18th	Rode as Teesside Tigers
1977 National League season	9th	Rode as Teesside Tigers
1978 National League season	18th	Rode as Teesside Tigers
1979 National League season	11th	
1980 National League season	3rd	
1981 National League season	1st	champions
1982 National League season	4th	
1983 National League season	7th	
1984 National League season	9th	
1985 National League season	3rd	
1986 National League season	3rd	
1987 National League season	9th	
1988 National League season	15th	
1989 National League season	13th	Reverted to the Bears
1990 National League season	2nd	
1991 British League Division Two season	8th	
1992 British League Division Two season	11th	
1993 British League Division Two season	7th	
1994 British League Division Two season	6th	
1995 Premier League speedway season	20th	
1996 Premier League speedway season	16th	
