= Tim Swales =

English motorcycle racer (born 1948)

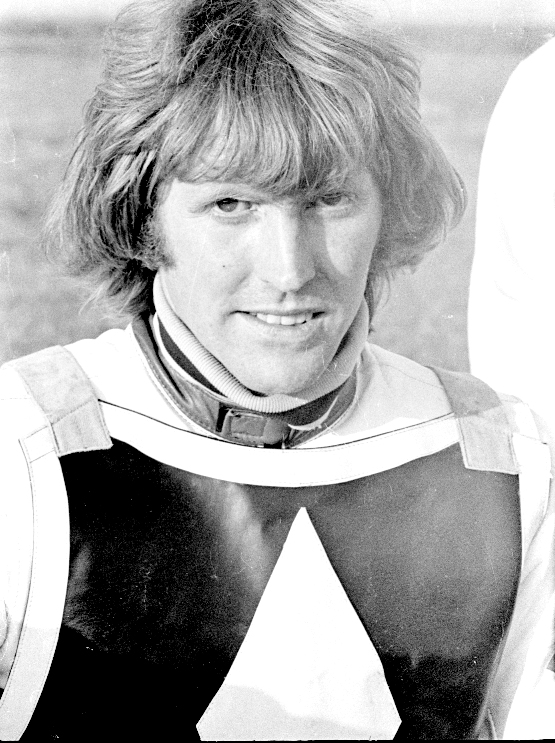
- Born: 25 February 1948 (age 78); Yarm, England

Career history
- 1969-1974: Teesside Tigers/Middlesbrough Tigers
- 1970, 1975-1976: Newcastle Diamonds
- 1970: Hackney Hawks
- 1971: Wolverhampton Wolves
- 1974: Scunthorpe Saints
- 1974: Sunderland Stars

Team honours
- 1976: National League Champion
- 1976: National League KO Cup Winner

Timothy Swales (born 25 February 1948) is a former motorcycle speedway rider from England.

== Career ==
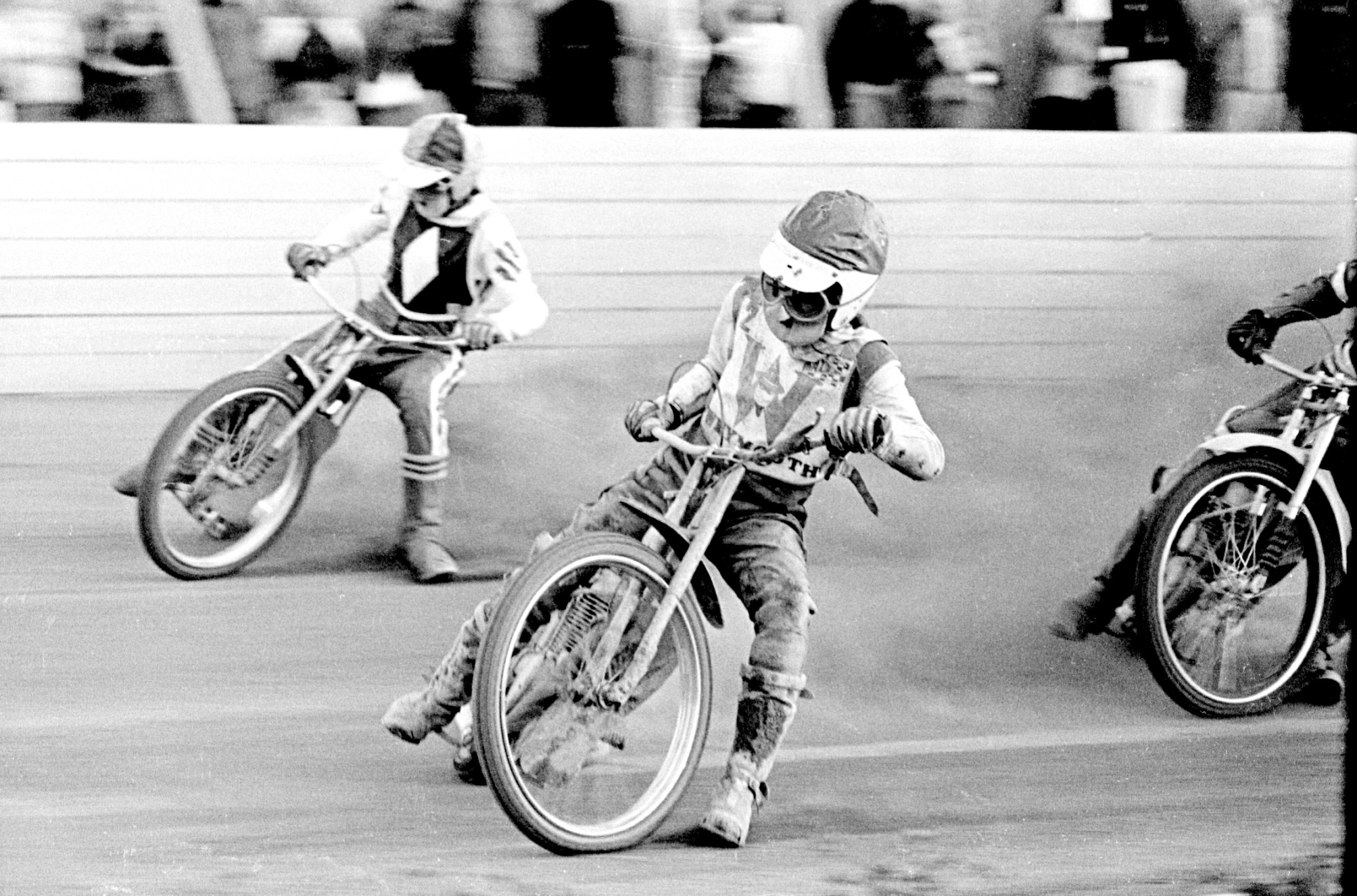
Tim Swales of Newcastle Diamonds and Chris Robins of Weymouth Wizards in 1975

Swales born in Yarm, made his speedway debut in second half reserve matches for Middlesbrough Teessiders in 1968, and began his British leagues career riding for Middlesbrough during the 1969 British League Division Two season.

Throughout his career, Swales rode mostly for the Teesside/Middlesbrough Teessiders/Tigers and Newcastle Diamonds with loans to other teams, turning in good scores in the middle ranks. Middlesbrough had been known as "Teessiders" (1968-1972) and "Tigers" (1973), becoming "Bears" in 1989, returning to an earlier nickname. He appeared on the cover of the Speedway Star (w/e 9 September 1972) with brother Tony.

Swales became a promoter at Redcar Bears, a role he was followed in by nephew, Jamie Swales. The Swales family was widely involved in speedway, Jack Swales (1963-1965 at Middlesbrough), Tony Swales (1970-1974 at Teesside), and Andrew, Stuart and Matthew.

Swales also had a spell as chair of the British Promoters' Speedway Association (BSPA) and served on the FIM.

Swales was married to Sally (who also had a spell co-promoting), and they have a son and daughter and grandchildren. The family business is a motor garage at Osmotherley. Swales served as a Councillor on the North Yorkshire Council, elected in 2004, representing the North Hambleton District and serving as Chairman 2014–2015.
