= Dennis Parker (speedway rider) =

British motorcycle speedway rider

- Born: 5 January 1925; Birmingham, England
- Died: 15 January 2008 (aged 83)
- Nationality: British (English)

Career history
- 1947: Sheffield Tigers
- 1948–1949: Edinburgh Monarchs
- 1950–1952: Belle Vue Aces
- 1953, 1956: Leicester Hunters

Team honours
- 1947: British Speedway Cup (tier 2)

Dennis Parker (5 January 1925 – 15 January 2008) was an international motorcycle speedway rider from England. He earned five international caps for the England national speedway team.

== Biography ==
Parker, born in Birmingham, rode on grasstrack before undertaking a speedway career. He began his British leagues career riding for Sheffield Tigers during the 1947 Speedway National League Division Two season and helped the team win the division 2 British Speedway Cup. The following season he signed for Edinburgh Monarchs and stayed with the Scottish club for two seasons. While at Edinburgh, he toured Australia during the 1948/49 winter and recorded some significant results, including finishing runner-up to Aub Lawson in the South Australian Individual Speedway Championship.

Parker's form at Edinburgh earned him a place in the England team against Australia for the 1949/50 winter test series and on his return to England, he signed a deal with the Belle Vue Aces (captained by his uncle Jack Parker) in the top division for the 1950.

After three seasons with Belle Vue, Parker signed to ride for the Leicester Hunters in March 1953. After one season with the club where he averaged 5.71, he told Leicester that he was retiring to concentrate on his haulage contracting business. However, he did return for a few rides during the 1956 season for Leicester.

== Family ==
Parker's uncles Norman and Jack Parker were international riders.
