= Frank Hodgson =

English motorcycle speedway rider

- Hodgson in 1951
- Born: 25 May 1908; Middlesbrough, England
- Died: 8 May 1983 (aged 74)
- Nationality: British (English)

Career history
- 1937: Nottingham
- 1937–1939: Hackney Wick Wolves
- 1946–1948: Middlesbrough Bears
- 1949–1950: Newcastle Diamonds
- 1950–1952: Glasgow Tigers

Team honours
- 1938, 1947: National League Div 2 Champion
- 1946: Northern League Champion
- 1937: Provincial Trophy
- 1937: Provincial League Coronation Cup
- 1947: National Trophy (Div Two) Winner

Frank Hodgson (25 May 1908 – 8 May 1983) was a motorcycle speedway rider from England, who rode for Hackney Wick Wolves and Middlesbrough Bears.

== Career ==
Born in Middlesbrough, Hodgson's first job in speedway was as a sign-writer at Hackney Wick Stadium in 1935. He had previously competed in grasstrack racing, and his early speedway experience was gained with the Amateur Riders' Club in Dagenham in 1936, where he also worked in the Ford factory. He signed for Nottingham in 1937, returning to Hackney Wick as a rider later that year. He was captain of Hackney's team in the second division in 1938 and 1939, before his career was interrupted by World War II, in which he served in the Royal Air Force. In 1946, he rode for Middlesbrough Bears, whom he also captained, his brother Jack Hodgson also a member of the team. A fractured spine at the start of the season kept him out of speedway for two months, but he returned later in the season, winning a round of the British Riders' Championship, and leading his team to the Northern League title.

Hodgson later moved on to Newcastle Diamonds, where he became the club captain. He suffered a serious spinal injury at the end of the 1949 season before returning in May 1950. Also in 1950, he joined Glasgow Tigers, missing the start of the 1952 season after falling from a ladder and breaking a rib.

Hodgson's son Russ and grandson Russell "Rusty" Hodgson both followed him into careers in speedway.
