= Tom Owen (speedway rider) =

British speedway rider

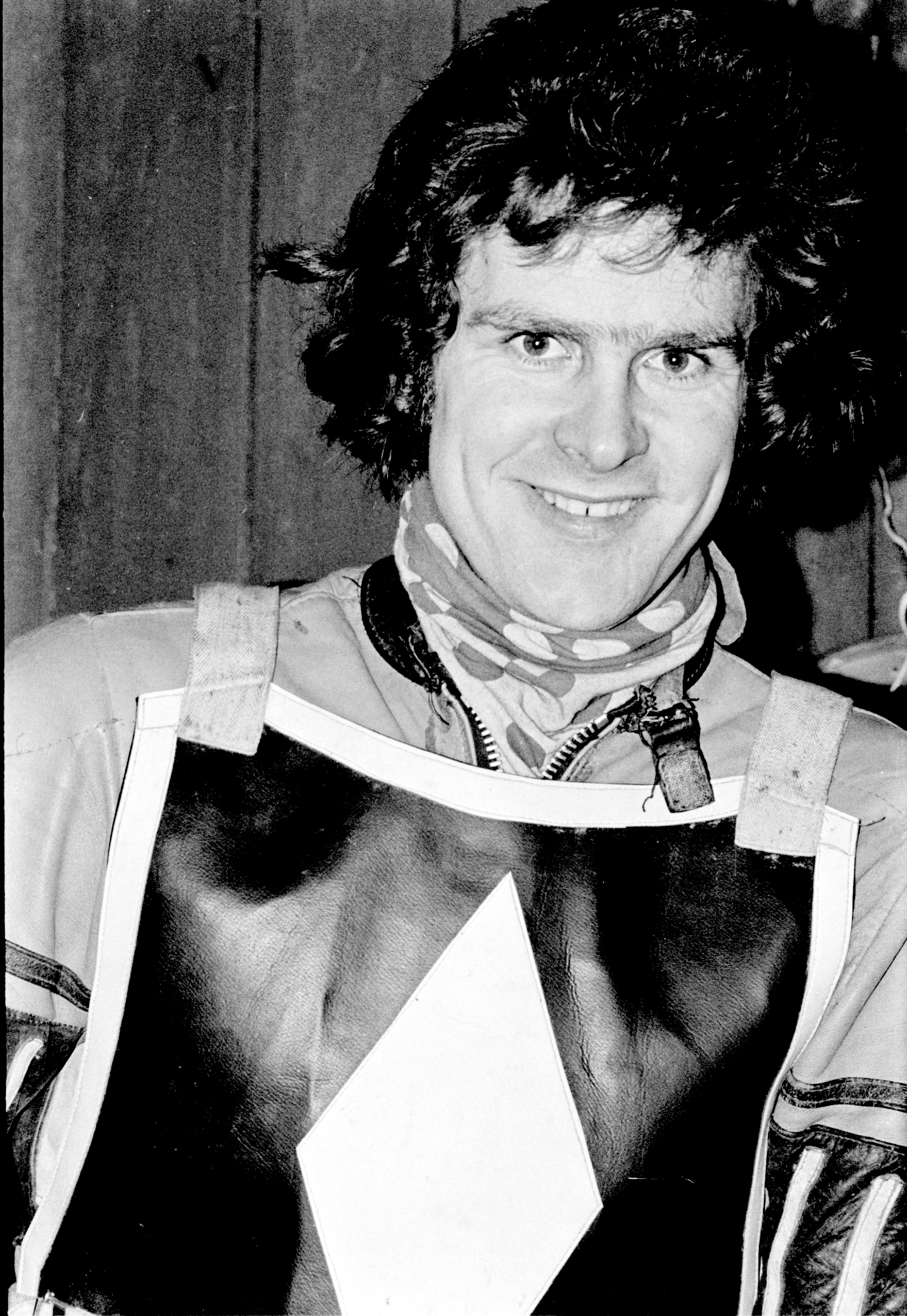
- Born: 19 June 1951 (age 75); Ormskirk, West Lancashire, England
- Nationality: British (English)

Career history
- 1972–1974: Barrow Happy Faces/Bombers
- 1974, 1976–1978, 1980: Hull Vikings
- 1974–1975: Newport
- 1975–1982, 1987: Newcastle Diamonds
- 1983–1986: Stoke Potters
- 1984: Wolverhampton Wolves

Individual honours
- 1977, 1978, 1979: NL leading average
- 1975: New National League Northern Riders Champion
- 1979: Warners Grand National Champion

Team honours
- 1976 1982 1983: National League Champion
- 1976 1982: National League KO Cup Winner
- 1975, 1984: National League Pairs Winner
- 1976: National League Four Team Champion
- 1975: Spring Gold Cup
- 1982 1983: National League Supernational Playoff Champion

Thomas John Owen (born 19 June 1951) is a former motorcycle speedway rider from England. He earned one international cap for the England national speedway team.

== Speedway career ==
Owen rode in the top two tiers of British Speedway from 1972 to 1987, riding for various clubs.

Owen won the National League Pairs, partnering Brian Havelock for the Newcastle Diamonds during the 1975 New National League season. In 1975 and 1976, he finished second to his younger brother Joe Owen in the league averages.

In 1976, Owen helped the Newcastle Diamonds win the treble of League, Knockout Cup and Fours Championship during the 1976 National League season.

Owen then topped the averages for three consecutive years in 1977, 1978 and 1979 becoming arguably the National League's leading rider during the period.

In 1984, Owen won the National League Pairs with Nigel Crabtree.
