= Jack Hodgson (speedway rider) =

British motorcycle speedway rider (1915 – 1989)

- Hodgson in 1951
- Born: 21 June 1915; Middlesbrough, England
- Died: September 1989 (aged 74); Northallerton, North Yorkshire, England
- Nationality: British (English)

Career history
- 1946–1948: Middlesbrough Bears
- 1949–1952: Glasgow Tigers
- 1949: Newcastle Magpies

Team honours
- 1946, 1947: League champion (tier 2)
- 1947: National trophy (tier 2)

John Thusson Hodgson (21 June 1915 – September 1989) was a motorcycle speedway rider from England.

== Biography ==
Hodgson, born in Middlesbrough, first started in speedway when he was one of the riders who turned up for the newly formed Middlesbrough Colts Club in 1939. His older brother Frank Hodgson was the team captain for the Hackney Wick Wolves senior side at the time.

Hodgson began his British leagues career riding for Middlesbrough Bears during the 1946 Speedway Northern League season, where he joined his brother Frank. The brothers won the league title with the team in 1946 and then completed the league and National trophy double in 1947. He remained with Middlesbrough for 1948 and recorded an 8.77 average.

In 1949, Middlesbrough dropped out of the league and were replaced by Newcastle Magpies, where Hodgson rode until September, before switching with Will Lowther in an exchange with Glasgow Tigers.

Hodgson spent the remainder of his career with Glasgow from 1950 to 1952, where he once again teamed up with his brother. He also reached the Championship round of the 1951 Individual Speedway World Championship.
