= Macmillan Academy =

Location
- Stockton Road; Middlesbrough, North Yorkshire, TS5 4AG; England; 54.5656°N 1.2633°W

Information
- Type: Academy
- Motto: "Inspiring Every Student to Succeed"
- Established: 1989 (as Macmillan CTC) 2006 (as Macmillan Academy)
- Local authority: Middlesbrough
- Department for Education URN: 130908 Tables
- Ofsted: Reports
- Principal: Phil Latham
- Head of School: Rachel Coning
- Gender: Mixed
- Age: 11 to 18
- Enrolment: 1564
Colour
- Website: www.macmillan-academy.org.uk

Macmillan Academy is an academy in Middlesbrough, North Yorkshire, England. The school was founded in 1989 as the Macmillan City Technology College, one of the first of 15 City Technology Colleges established in England. Its initial sponsors were the Macmillan Trust, a charity run by Macmillan Publishers, The school converted to academy status in 2006. An Ofsted inspection in 2007 rated the school as outstanding. As of 2020, its most recent full inspection was in 2013, when it was judged Good.

== History ==
The school opened in 1989 as Macmillan City Technology College along with the current buildings (now English and Mathematics). It later became Macmillan College. The current reception and dining hall were opened in the early 2000s and the school converted to academy status in 2006, along with a new building housing Science, Music and Physical Education.

== Notable alumni ==
- Steph McGovern – TV presenter
- Jacob Young – former Conservative MP for Redcar
- Sam Gowland – TV personality
- Lewis Boyce – Rugby union player
