= 1982 Speedway World Team Cup =

23rd edition of the annual motorcycle speedway World Cup competition

Seasons
- ← 1981 1983 →

The 1982 Speedway World Team Cup was the 23rd edition of the FIM Speedway World Team Cup to determine the team world champions.

The final took place on 15 August, at the White City Stadium in London. The United States won their first title.

== Qualification stage 1 ==
Day	Venue	Winner
Stage 1
16 May	(England) King's Lynn	England
16 May	(Norway) Varhaug	Denmark
16 May	(Italy) Lonigo	Czechoslovakia
16 May	(Hungary) Miskolc	Poland
26 June	(Czechoslovakia) Slaný	Czechoslovakia

=== Commonwealth round ===
- 16 May
- (England) King's Lynn, Norfolk Arena
- Referee: (Sweden) C. Ringstrom

Placing	Team / Rider name	Total	1	2	3	4	5	6	7	8	9	10	11	12	13	14	15	16	Pts	17	18	19	20
1	England	42	1	4	7	10	12	14	17	19	21	24	27	28	31	33	36	39		42	42	42	42
1	(13) Dave Jessup	11		3					3		2							3	11
1	(14) Kenny Carter	9	1							2		3					3		9
1	(15) Peter Collins	11			3			2						1		2			8	3
1	(16) Michael Lee	11				3	2						3		3				11
1	(20) Malcolm Simmons	0																	0
2	United States	41	3	5	7	9	12	15	17	20	23	25	27	30	32	35	37	39		41	41	41	41
2	(1) Bruce Penhall	10				2				3				3				2	10
2	(2) Dennis Sigalos	8			2				2				2				2		8
2	(3) Shawn Moran	9		2				3				2			2				9
2	(4) Kelly Moran	14	3				3				3					3			12	2
2	(17) Scott Autrey	0																	0
3	Australia	10	2	3	4	4	5	6	6	6	6	7	7	9	9	9	10	10		10	10	10	10
3	(5) Billy Sanders	3	2					1					0					0	3
3	(6) Phil Crump	5		1			1							2			1		5
3	(7) John Titman	1				0			0			1				0			1
3	(8) Gary Guglielmi	1			1					0	-				0				1
3	(18) Steve Baker	0									0								0
4	New Zealand	8	0	0	0	1	1	1	2	3	4	4	5	5	6	7	7	8		8	8	8	8
4	(9) Wayne Brown	1			0		0					-						1	1
4	(10) David Bargh	2				1		0			1						0		2
4	(11) Mitch Shirra	3		0						1			1			1			3
4	(12) Ivan Mauger	2	0						1					0	1				2
4	(19) Bruce Cribb	0										0							0
Placing	Team / Rider name	Total	1	2	3	4	5	6	7	8	9	10	11	12	13	14	15	16	Pts	17	18	19	20

M - exclusion for exceeding two-minute time allowance • T - exclusion for touching the tapes • X - other exclusion • E - retired or mechanical failure • F - fell

Helmet colours were permanent for each team (Red, Blue, White and Yellow/Black). Colours in diagrams indicate gate positions:
gate A – inside	gate B	gate C	gate D – outside

* England & USA to Intercontinental Final

=== Scandinavian round ===
- 16 May
- (Norway) Elgane, Varhaug

1st	2nd	3rd	4th
Denmark - 43; Erik Gundersen - 12; Hans Nielsen - 12; Ole Olsen - 10; Tommy Knudsen - 9 Bo Petersen - NS	Sweden - 23+3; Richard Hellsen - 8 Jan Andersson - 7+3; Tommy Nilsson - 4 Hans Danielsson - 3 Anders Eriksson - 1	Finland - 23+2; Kai Niemi - 10+2; Ari Koponen - 6 Olli Tyrväinen - 4 Pekka Hautamaki - 3 Olli Turkia - NS	Norway - 7 Dag Haaland - 3 Roy Otto - 3 Asgeir Bjerga - 1 Sigvart Pedersen - 0 Ingve Madland - NS

* Denmark & Sweden to Intercontinental Final

=== Continental round ===
- 16 May
- (Italy) Santa Marina Stadium, Lonigo

1st	2nd	3rd	4th
Czechoslovakia - 40; Petr Kucera - 11; Zdeněk Kudrna - 11; Aleš Dryml Sr. - 10; Milan Špinka - 6 Jan Verner - 2	Italy - 37; Francesco Biginato - 11; Gianni Famari - 10; Mauro Ferraccioli - 9 Armando Dal Chiele - 7 Luigi Bazan - NS	Netherlands - 13; Henny Kroeze - 4 Rudi Muts - 3 Piet Seur - 3 Henk Steman - 2 Leo Bathoorn - 1	Yugoslavia - 6 Albert Kocmut - 4 Stefan Kekec - 1 Vlado Kocuvan - 1 Krešo Omerzel - 0 Zvanco Pavlic - 0

* Czechoslovakia & Italy to Continental Semi-Final

- 16 May
- (Hungary) Borsod Volán Stadion, Miskolc

1st	2nd	3rd	4th
Poland - 40; Henryk Olszak - 12; Roman Jankowski - 10; Edward Jancarz - 9 Zenon Plech - 9 Piotr Pyszny - 0	Hungary - 24; Ferenc Farkas - 8 Zoltan Hajdu - 6 Istvan Sziraczki - 6 Zoltán Adorján - 4 Janos Oresko - NS	Bulgaria - 18; Nikolai Manev - 7 Orlin Janakiev - 5 Angel Eftimov - 4 Vesselin Markov - 2 Todor Stojanov - NS	Austria - 14; Hubert Fischbacher - 6 Herbert Szerecs - 3 Adi Funk - 2 Robert Funk - 2 Herbert Engelmaier - 1

* Poland & Hungary to Continental Semi-Final

Semi final

- 26 June
- (Czechoslovakia) Slaný Speedway Stadium, Slaný

Pos.	National team	Pts.	Riders
1st	Czechoslovakia	38	Aleš Dryml Sr. - 11; Petr Ondrašík - 9 Jiří Štancl - 9 Václav Verner - 9 Petr Kucera - NS
2nd	Poland	24	Roman Jankowski - 9 Henryk Olszak - 9 Edward Jancarz - 3 Zenon Plech - 3 Leonard Raba - 0
3rd	Italy	23	Francesco Biginato - 8 Gianni Famari - 6 Armando Dal Chiele - 5 Mauro Ferraccioli - 4 Luigi Bazan - NS
4	Hungary	11	Zoltan Hajdu - 4 Zoltán Adorján - 3 Istvan Sziraczki - 3 Ferenc Farkas - 0 Janos Oresko - 1

== Qualification stage 2 ==
=== Continental final ===
- 11 July
- (West Germany) Ellermühle Stadium, Landshut

Pos.	National team	Pts.	Riders
1st	Czechoslovakia	31+3	13.Aleš Dryml Sr. - 9 (3,3,2,1); 14.Jiří Štancl - 10+3 (1,3,3,3); 15.Václav Verner - 4 (2,f,1,1); 16.Petr Ondrašík - 8 (3,2,2,1); 20.Petr Kucera - NS
2nd	West Germany	31+2	1.Georg Hack - 7 (0,2,3,2); 2.Alois Wiesböck - 6 (3,0,3,0); 3.Egon Müller - 8+2 (2,3,f,3); 4.Karl Maier - 10 (3,1,3,3); 17.Georg Gilgenreiner - NS
3rd	Poland	19	9.Edward Jancarz - 6 (1,3,2,0); 10.Roman Jankowski - 6 (2,2,f,2); 11.Marek Kepa - 2 (1,1,-,0); 12.Henryk Olszak - 5 (2,1,0,2); 19.Jerzy Rembas - 0 (-,-,f,-)
4	Soviet Union	15	5.Viktor Kuznetsov - 5 (e,1,1,3); 6.Mikhail Starostin - 3 (f,0,2,1); 7.Valery Gordeev - 6 (1,2,1,2); 8.Rif Saitgareev - 0 (0,-,-,0); 18.Vladimir Paznikov - 1 (-,0,1,-)

=== Intercontinental final ===
- (Denmark) Speedway Center, Vojens
- 26 June
- Att: 9,500

Pos.	National team	Pts.	Riders
1st	United States	34	13.Bruce Penhall - 10 (3,3,2,2); 14.Dennis Sigalos - 5 (r,2,3,0); 15.Shawn Moran - 9 (3,3,2,1); 16.Kelly Moran - 10 (1,3,3,3); 20.Bobby Schwartz - NS
2nd	Denmark	28	9.Ole Olsen - 3 (0,1,1,1); 10.Alf Busk - NS; 11.Preben Eriksen - 7 (1,1,2,3); 12.Hans Nielsen - 8 (2,2,1,3); 19.Erik Gundersen - 10 (2,2,3,3)
3rd	England	25	1.Kenny Carter - 12 (3,3,3,3); 2.Dave Jessup - 4 (2,e,0,2); 3.Chris Morton - 6 (2,1,2,1); 4.Peter Collins - 3 (1,0,-,2); 17.Michael Lee - 0 (-,-,0,-)
4	Sweden	9	5.Jan Andersson - 3 (2,0,1,0); 6.Richard Hellsen - 3 (f,2,0,1); 7.Tommy Nilsson - 1 (f,1,0,0); 8.Bjorn Andersson - 1 (1,0,-,0); 18.Lillebror Johansson - 1 (-,-,1,-)

== World final ==
- (England) White City Stadium, London
- 15 August
- Att: 3,500
- Referee: (England) John Whitaker

Pos.	National team	Pts.	Riders
1st	United States	37	1.Bruce Penhall - 10 (3,2,3,2); 2.Bobby Schwartz - 9 (3,3,3,-); 3.Shawn Moran - 8 (3,1,1,3); 4.Kelly Moran - 10 (1,3,3,3); R Scott Autrey - 0 (-,-,-,0)
2nd	Denmark	24	1.Ole Olsen - 1 (0,1,-,-); 2.Hans Nielsen - 11 (3,3,3,2); 3.Erik Gundersen - 7 (2,3,2,e); 4.Preben Eriksen - 4 (f,-,2,2); R Tommy Knudsen - 1 (-,0,1,0)
3rd	West Germany	18	1.Georg Hack - 5 (2,2,f,1); 2.Karl Maier - 7 (1,2,1,3); 3.Egon Müller - 5 (2,2,0,1); 4.Alois Wiesböck - 0 (0,0,-,-); R Georg Gilgenreiner - 1 (-,-,0,1)
4	Czechoslovakia	17	1.Aleš Dryml Sr. - 7 (1,1,2,3); 2.Jiří Štancl - 4 (1,0,2,1); 3.Václav Verner - 6 (2,1,1,2); 4.Petr Ondrašík - 0 (0,-,0,-); R Antonín Kasper, Jr. - 0 (-,0,-,0)

== See also ==
- 1982 Individual Speedway World Championship
- 1982 Speedway World Pairs Championship
