= 1979 Speedway World Team Cup =

20th edition of the annual motorcycle speedway World Cup competition

Seasons
- ← 1978 1980 →

The 1979 Speedway World Team Cup was the 20th edition of the FIM Speedway World Team Cup to determine the team world champions.

The final took place on 16 September at the White City Stadium in London. New Zealand won their first title defeating defending champions Denmark, who finished in second place.

== Qualification Stage 1 ==
=== Commonwealth Round ===
- 20 May
- (England) Smallmead Stadium, Reading
- Referee: (Sweden) C.Bergstrom

Placing	Team / Rider name	Total	1	2	3	4	5	6	7	8	9	10	11	12	13	14	15	16	Pts	17	18	19	20
1	New Zealand	30	2	5	8	8	9	12	14	15	17	20	21	23	24	27	28	30		30	30	30	30
1	(13) Ivan Mauger	9		3					2		2							2	9
1	(14) Larry Ross	7	2							1		3					1		7
1	(15) Mitch Shirra	11			3			3						2		3			11
1	(16) Bruce Cribb	3				0	1						1		1				3
1	(20) Roger Abel	0																	0
2	United States	26	3	5	7	10	13	13	13	15	16	16	18	18	21	23	26	26		26	26	26	26
2	(9) Bruce Penhall	5			2		3					0						F	5
2	(10) Kelly Moran	7				3		E			1						3		7
2	(11) Bobby Schwartz	8		2						2			2			2			8
2	(12) Steve Gresham	6	3						F					T	3				6
2	(19) Dennis Sigalos	0																	0
3	England	22	0	1	2	4	6	7	8	11	11	13	16	17	19	19	21	22		22	22	22	22
3	(5) Malcolm Simmons	0	0					-					-					-	0
3	(6) Gordon Kennett	6		1			2							1			2		6
3	(7) Peter Collins	5				2			1			2				F			5
3	(8) Michael Lee	4			1					3	0				-				4
3	(18) Dave Jessup	7						1					3		2			1	7
4	Australia	18	1	1	1	2	2	4	7	7	10	11	11	14	14	15	15	18		18	18	18	18
4	(1) Phil Crump	7				1				0				3				3	7
4	(2) Billy Sanders	3			E				3				F				0		3
4	(3) Phil Herne	2		0				2				-			-				2
4	(4) John Titman	5	1				0				3					1			5
4	(17) John Boulger	1										1			0				1
Placing	Team / Rider name	Total	1	2	3	4	5	6	7	8	9	10	11	12	13	14	15	16	Pts	17	18	19	20

M - exclusion for exceeding two-minute time allowance • T - exclusion for touching the tapes • X - other exclusion • E - retired or mechanical failure • F - fell

Helmet colours were permanent for each team (Red, Blue, White and Yellow/Black). Colours in diagrams indicate gate positions:
gate A – inside	gate B	gate C	gate D – outside

* New Zealand and USA to Intercontinental Final

=== Scandinavian Round ===
- 20 May
- (Finland) Eteläpuisto, Tampere

1st	2nd	3rd	4th
Denmark - 39; Hans Nielsen - 12; Ole Olsen - 11; Mike Lohmann - 10; Bo Petersen - 4 Erik Gundersen - 2	Sweden - 32; Anders Michanek - 10; Bernt Persson - 9 Jan Andersson- 8 Tommy Nilsson - 3 Stefan Salomonsson - 2	Finland - 16; Kai Niemi - 7 Pekka Hautamaki - 4 Ari Koponen - 3 Olli Turkia - 2 Ila Teromaa - 0	Norway - 9 Tormod Langli - 6 Reidar Eide - 1 Tom Godal - 1 Rolf Gramstad - 1 Toralf Olen - 0

* Denmark and Sweden to Intercontinental Final

=== Continental Round ===
- 20 May
- (West Germany) Illerstadion, Kempten

1st	2nd	3rd	4th
Austria - 32; Herbert Szerecs - 10; Walter Grubmüler - 9 Adi Funk - 7 Hubert Fischbacher - 5 Gunther Walla - 1	Netherlands - 30; Frits Koppe - 9 Henny Kroeze - 8 Rudi Muts- 5 Frits Koning - 4 Henk Steman - 4	West Germany - 29; Waldemar Bacik - 9 Georg Hack - 9 Karl Maier - 8 Georg Gilgenreiner - 2 Wolfgang Mayr - 1	Yugoslavia - 5 Frank Hagar - 2 Ivan Vobujak - 2 Vlado Kocuvan - 1 Manfred Kosmut - 0 Jozef Mavsar - 0

* Austria and Netherlands to Continental Semifinal

- 20 May
- (Hungary) Borsod Volán Stadion, Miskolc

1st	2nd	3rd	4th
Soviet Union - 34; Mikhail Starostin - 11; Valery Gordeev - 9 Grigory Khlinovsky - 7 Sergey Denisov - 6 Vladimir Klychkov - 1	Hungary - 30; Laszlo Meszaros - 9 Istvan Sziraczki - 9 Janos Szoeke- 9 Tibor Danka - 1 Antal Tamcsu - 0	Italy - 25; Giuseppe Marzotto - 9 Paulo Noro - 7 Mauro Ferracciolo - 5 Francesco Biginato - 4	Bulgaria - 9 Atanasz Janakiev - 3 Orlin Janakiev - 3 Nikolai Manev - 2 Deter Kostov - 1 Angel Eftimov - 0

* Soviet Union and Hungary to Continental Semifinal

Semifinal

- 15 July
- (Czechoslovakia) Svítkova Stadion, Pardubice

Placing	Team / Rider name	Total	1	2	3	4	5	6	7	8	9	10	11	12	13	14	15	16	Pts	17	18	19	20
1	Soviet Union	45	3	6	6	9	12	15	18	21	24	27	30	33	36	39	42	45		45	45	45	45
1	(13) Mikhail Starostin	12		3					3		3							3	12
1	(14) Valery Gordeev	12	3							3		3					3		12
1	(15) Viktor Kuznetsov	9			F			3						3		3			9
1	(16) Grigory Khlinovsky	12				3	3						3		3				12
1	(20) Anatoly Maksimov	0																	0
2	Hungary	21	2	3	6	8	8	10	10	11	11	13	15	16	18	19	19	21		21	21	21	21
2	(1) Istvan Sziraczki	6				2				1				1				2	6
2	(2) Janos Szoeke	5			3				0				2				0		5
2	(3) Laszlo Meszaros	7		1				2				2			2				7
2	(4) Janos Jacob	2	2				0				-					-			2
2	(17) Antal Tamcsu	1									0					1			1
3	Netherlands	16	1	1	3	4	6	6	8	10	11	11	12	14	14	14	16	16		16	16	16	16
3	(5) Frits Koning	2	1					0					1					-	2
3	(6) Piet Seur	0		0			-							-			-		0
3	(7) Frits Koppe	3				1			2			F				F			3
3	(8) Henk Steman	5			2					2	1				0				5
3	(18) Rudi Muts	6					2							2			2	F	6
4	Austria	14	0	2	3	3	4	5	6	6	8	9	9	9	10	12	13	14		14	14	14	14
4	(9) Herbert Szerecs	4			1		1					1						1	4
4	(10) Adi Funk	4				0		1			2						1		4
4	(11) Hubert Fischbacher	4		2						0			E			2			4
4	(12) Walter Grubmüler	2	0						1					-	1				2
4	(19) Siegfried Eder	0												E					0
Placing	Team / Rider name	Total	1	2	3	4	5	6	7	8	9	10	11	12	13	14	15	16	Pts	17	18	19	20

M - exclusion for exceeding two-minute time allowance • T - exclusion for touching the tapes • X - other exclusion • E - retired or mechanical failure • F - fell

Helmet colours were permanent for each team (Red, Blue, White and Yellow/Black). Colours in diagrams indicate gate positions:
gate A – inside	gate B	gate C	gate D – outside

* Soviet Union and Hungary to Continental Final

== Qualifying Stage 2 ==
=== Continental Final ===
- 29 July
- (Poland) Olympic Stadium, Wrocław
- Att: 35,000

Placing	Team / Rider name	Total	1	2	3	4	5	6	7	8	9	10	11	12	13	14	15	16	Pts	17	18	19	20
1	Poland	40	3	6	9	12	15	18	21	24	26	29	30	33	34	37	39	40		40	40	40	40
1	(9) Zenon Plech	9			3		3					3						-	9
1	(10) Robert Słaboń	10				3		3			2						2		10
1	(11) Jerzy Rembas	10		3						3			1			3			10
1	(12) Edward Jancarz	9	3						3					3	-				9
1	(19) Andrzej Huszcza	2													1			1	2
2	Czechoslovakia	28	0	1	3	5	7	8	10	12	13	15	16	17	20	23	25	28		28	28	28	28
2	(1) Jiří Štancl	8				2				2				1				3	8
2	(2) Aleš Dryml Sr.	7			2				2				1				2		7
2	(3) Petr Ondrašík	2		1				1				-			-				2
2	(4) Zdeněk Kudrna	6	F				2				1					3			6
2	(17) Václav Verner	5										2			3				5
3	Soviet Union	27	2	4	5	6	7	9	10	11	12	13	16	18	20	22	25	27		27	27	27	27
3	(5) Valery Gordeev	9	2					2					3					2	9
3	(6) Mikhail Starostin	8		2			1							2			3		8
3	(7) Grigory Khlinovsky	5				1			1			1				2			5
3	(8) Viktor Kuznetsov	5			1					1	1				2				5
3	(18) Anatoly Maksimov	0																	0
4	Hungary	1	1	1	1	1	1	1	1	1	1	1	1	1	1	1	1	1		1	1	1	1
4	(13) Ferenc Farkas	0		0					0		0							-	0
4	(14) Laszlo Juhasz	1	1							0		0					0		1
4	(15) Zoltán Adorján	0			0			0						0		-			0
4	(16) Zoltan Hajdu	0				0	0						0		0				0
4	(20) Csaba Nagy	0														0		E	0
Placing	Team / Rider name	Total	1	2	3	4	5	6	7	8	9	10	11	12	13	14	15	16	Pts	17	18	19	20

M - exclusion for exceeding two-minute time allowance • T - exclusion for touching the tapes • X - other exclusion • E - retired or mechanical failure • F - fell

Helmet colours were permanent for each team (Red, Blue, White and Yellow/Black). Colours in diagrams indicate gate positions:
gate A – inside	gate B	gate C	gate D – outside

* Poland and Czechoslovakia to Final

=== Intercontinental Final ===
- 14 June
- (Sweden) Snälltorpet, Eskilstuna
- Att: 4,400

Placing	Team / Rider name	Total	1	2	3	4	5	6	7	8	9	10	11	12	13	14	15	16	Pts	17	18	19	20
1	New Zealand	29	0	3	5	8	11	14	14	16	17	20	22	24	26	26	26	29		29	29	29	29
1	(9) Ivan Mauger	11			2		3					3						3	11
1	(10) Larry Ross	7				3		3			1						0		7
1	(11) Mitch Shirra	7		3						2			2			0			7
1	(12) Bruce Cribb	4	0						0					2	2				4
1	(19) Roger Abel	0																	0
2	Denmark	27	2	5	5	5	7	10	12	13	13	13	16	16	19	22	25	27		27	27	27	27
2	(5) Ole Olsen	10	2					3					3					2	10
2	(6) Mike Lohmann	8		3			2							0			3		8
2	(7) Hans Nielsen	5				0			2			T				3			5
2	(8) Bo Petersen	4			0					1	-				3				4
2	(18) Bent Rasmussen	0									0								0
3	United States	22	2	3	5	6	7	7	9	9	12	15	15	17	19	20	20	22		22	22	22	22
3	(13) Kelly Moran	8		1					2		3							2	8
3	(14) Bruce Penhall	5	2					T				3					0		5
3	(15) Bobby Schwartz	5			2			0						2		1			5
3	(16) Steve Gresham	4				1	1						0		2				4
3	(20) Ron Preston	0																	0
4	Sweden	18	1	1	2	5	5	6	9	10	12	13	14	15	16	16	17	18		18	18	18	18
4	(1) Richard Hellsen	6				3				1				1				1	6
4	(2) Anders Michanek	6			1				3				1				1		6
4	(3) Jan Andersson	3		0				1				1			1				3
4	(4) Bernt Persson	3	1				0				2					0			3
4	(17) Bo Wirebrand	0																	0
Placing	Team / Rider name	Total	1	2	3	4	5	6	7	8	9	10	11	12	13	14	15	16	Pts	17	18	19	20

M - exclusion for exceeding two-minute time allowance • T - exclusion for touching the tapes • X - other exclusion • E - retired or mechanical failure • F - fell

Helmet colours were permanent for each team (Red, Blue, White and Yellow/Black). Colours in diagrams indicate gate positions:
gate A – inside	gate B	gate C	gate D – outside

* New Zealand and Denmark to World Final

== World Final ==
- 16 September
- (England) White City Stadium, London
- Referee: (West Germany) Gunther Sorber

Placing	Team / Rider name	Total	1	2	3	4	5	6	7	8	9	10	11	12	13	14	15	16	Pts	17	18	19	20
1	New Zealand	35	1	3	6	9	12	15	16	18	20	23	26	27	29	32	35	35		35	35	35	35
1	(9) Ivan Mauger	9			3		3					3						F	9
1	(10) Larry Ross	11				3		3			2						3		11
1	(11) Mitch Shirra	10		2						2			3			3			10
1	(12) Bruce Cribb	5	1						1					1	2				5
1	(19) Roger Abel	0																	0
2	Denmark	31	3	6	8	9	9	10	13	16	19	21	21	23	26	27	28	31		31	31	31	31
2	(13) Ole Olsen	12		3					3		3							3	12
2	(14) Hans Nielsen	9	3							3		2					1		9
2	(15) Mike Lohmann	6			2			1						2		1			6
2	(16) Finn Thomsen	4				1	0						-		3				4
2	(20) Bo Petersen	0											E						0
3	Czechoslovakia	19	0	1	1	1	2	4	6	7	8	9	11	14	15	17	17	19		19	19	19	19
3	(1) Jiří Štancl	6				0				1				3				2	6
3	(2) Zdeněk Kudrna	4			X				2				2				0		4
3	(3) Aleš Dryml Sr.	5		1				2				1			1				5
3	(4) Václav Verner	4	0				1				1					2			4
3	(17) Petr Ondrašík	0																	0
4	Poland	11	2	2	3	5	7	7	7	7	7	7	8	8	8	8	10	11		11	11	11	11
4	(5) Piotr Pyszny	4	2					0					1					1	4
4	(6) Zenon Plech	4		E			2							0			2		4
4	(7) Robert Słaboń	2				2			F			F				-			2
4	(8) Marek Cieślak	1			1					E	-				F				1
4	(18) Andrzej Tkocz	0									0					0			0
Placing	Team / Rider name	Total	1	2	3	4	5	6	7	8	9	10	11	12	13	14	15	16	Pts	17	18	19	20

M - exclusion for exceeding two-minute time allowance • T - exclusion for touching the tapes • X - other exclusion • E - retired or mechanical failure • F - fell

Helmet colours were permanent for each team (Red, Blue, White and Yellow/Black). Colours in diagrams indicate gate positions:
gate A – inside	gate B	gate C	gate D – outside

== See also ==
- 1979 Individual Speedway World Championship
- 1979 Speedway World Pairs Championship
