= 1980 Speedway World Team Cup =

21st edition of the annual motorcycle speedway World Cup competition

Seasons
- ← 1979 1981 →

The 1980 Speedway World Team Cup was the 21st edition of the FIM Speedway World Team Cup to determine the team world champions.

The final took place at the Vojens Speedway Center in Denmark. England won their eighth title to extend their record and the United States had their best performance to date finishing second. The defending champions New Zealand finished last in the British qualifying round.

== Qualification Stage 1 ==
Day	Venue	Winner
Qualification
17 May	(West Germany) Breitenthal Speedway Stadium, Krumbach	West Germany
18 May	(England) King's Lynn Stadium, King's Lynn	England
18 May	(Italy) Castiglione Olona, Varese	(Soviet Union) USSR
11 June	(Sweden) Kumla Motorstadion, Kumla	Denmark
29 June	(West Germany) Rodenbach Motodrom, Rodenbach	West Germany

=== Commonwealth Round ===
- 18 May
- (England) King's Lynn, Norfolk Arena
- Referee: (Sweden) G Bergstrom

Placing	Team / Rider name	Total	1	2	3	4	5	6	7	8	9	10	11	12	13	14	15	16	Pts	17	18	19	20
1	England	42	2	5	7	10	12	15	17	20	22	25	28	31	34	37	40	42		42	42	42	42
1	(13) Peter Collins	9		3					2		2							2	9
1	(14) Michael Lee	11	2							3		3					3		11
1	(15) Dave Jessup	11			2			3						3		3			11
1	(16) Chris Morton	11				3	2						3		3				11
1	(20) John Louis	0																	0
2	United States	31	3	3	6	8	11	13	16	16	19	21	22	24	26	28	30	31		31	31	31	31
2	(9) Bruce Penhall	9			3		3					2						1	9
2	(10) Scott Autrey	9				2		2			3						2		9
2	(11) Bobby Schwartz	3		X						E			1			2			3
2	(12) Dennis Sigalos	10	3						3					2	2				10
2	(19) Ron Preston	0																	0
3	Australia	14	1	2	3	4	5	5	6	7	8	8	10	10	10	10	11	14		14	14	14	14
3	(5) Billy Sanders	6	1					0					2					3	6
3	(6) Mick McKeon	3		1			1							0			1		3
3	(7) Phil Herne	1				1			F			-				-			1
3	(8) Danny Kennedy	3			1					1	1				0				3
3	(18) Gary Guglielmi	1							1			0				0			1
4	New Zealand	9	0	2	2	2	2	3	3	5	5	6	6	7	8	9	9	9		9	9	9	9
4	(1) Ivan Mauger	3				0				2				1				0	3
4	(2) Mitch Shirra	0			0				X				0				-		0
4	(3) Larry Ross	5		2				1				1			1				5
4	(4) Bruce Cribb	1	0				0				-					1			1
4	(17) Wayne Brown	0									0						0		0
Placing	Team / Rider name	Total	1	2	3	4	5	6	7	8	9	10	11	12	13	14	15	16	Pts	17	18	19	20

M - exclusion for exceeding two-minute time allowance • T - exclusion for touching the tapes • X - other exclusion • E - retired or mechanical failure • F - fell

Helmet colours were permanent for each team (Red, Blue, White and Yellow/Black). Colours in diagrams indicate gate positions:
gate A – inside	gate B	gate C	gate D – outside

* England & USA to Intercontinental Final

=== Scandinivian Round ===
- 11 June
- (Sweden) Kumla Motorstadion, Kumla

1st	2nd	3rd	4th
Denmark - 43; Ole Olsen - 12; Bo Petersen - 12; Tommy Knudsen - 11; Hans Nielsen - 6 Erik Gundersen - 2	Sweden - 31; Anders Michanek - 10; Jan Andersson- 9 Richard Hellsen - 6 Bengt Jansson - 5 Bernt Persson - 1	Finland - 18; Kai Niemi - 6 Ari Koponen - 5 Veijo Tuoriniemi - 4 Ila Teromaa - 3 Pekka Hautamaki - 0	Norway - 4 Dag Haaland - 2 Audun Ove Olsen - 1 Trond Helge Skretting - 1 Reidar Eide - 0 Rolf Gramstad - 0

* Denmark & Sweden to Intercontinental Final

=== Continental Round ===
- 18 May
- (Italy) Castiglione Olona, Varese

1st	2nd	3rd	4th
Soviet Union - 41; Grigory Khlinovsky - 12; Valery Gordeev - 11; Viktor Kuznetsov - 11; Mikhail Starostin - 7	Italy - 21; Francesco Biginato - 8 Giuseppe Marzotto- 5 Giovanni Brizzolari - 4 Mauro Ferraccioli - 4	Austria - 17; Herbert Szerecs - 7 Adi Funk - 5 Walter Grubmüler - 4 Herbert Engelmaier - 1	Bulgaria - 16; Nikolai Manev - 7 Angel Eftimov - 4 Orlin Janakiev - 4 Ivan Marenov - 1

* Soviet Union & Italy to Continental Semi-Final

- 17 May
- (West Germany) Breitenthal Speedway Stadium, Krumbach

1st	2nd	3rd	4th
West Germany - 40; Waldemar Bacik - 12; Georg Hack - 12; Christoph Betzl - 9 Egon Müller - 7	Netherlands - 29; Rudi Muts - 9 Frits Koppe- 7 Henk Steman - 6 Henny Kroeze - 5 Wil Stroes - 2	Hungary - 22; Istvan Sziraczki - 9 Laszlo Meszaros - 6 Zoltan Hajdu - 4 Janos Szoke - 3 Ferenc Farkash - 0	Yugoslavia - 5 Franc Zagar - 2 Stefan Kekec - 1 Ivan Vrbnjak - 1 Darko Tominac - 1 Vlado Kocuvan - 0

* West Germany & Netherlands to Continental Semi-Final

Semifinal

- 29 June
- (West Germany) Rodenbach Motodrom, Rodenbach

Placing	Team / Rider name	Total	1	2	3	4	5	6	7	8	9	10	11	12	13	14	15	16	Pts	17	18	19	20
1	West Germany	38	2	5	7	9	12	15	18	21	24	26	29	31	31	34	35	38		38	38	38	38
1	(13) Egon Muller	12		3					3		3							3	12
1	(14) Waldemar Bacik	8	2							3		2					1		8
1	(15) Georg Hack	10			2			3						2		3			10
1	(16) Alois Wiesböck	8				2	3						3		E				8
1	(20) Christoph Betzl	0																	0
2	Soviet Union	29	1	3	3	6	8	10	11	12	14	17	19	22	24	24	27	29		29	29	29	29
2	(5) Valery Gordeev	7	1					2					2					2	7
2	(6) Mikhail Starostin	10		2			2							3			3		10
2	(7) Nikolay Kornev	7				3			1			3				F			7
2	(8) Grigory Khlinovsky	5			0					1	2				2				5
2	(18) Viktor Kuznetsov	0																	0
3	Netherlands	17	3	4	5	6	7	7	9	11	11	11	12	13	16	17	17	17		17	17	17	17
3	(9) Rudi Muts	2			1		1					F						-	2
3	(10) Henk Steman	1				1		0			E						-		1
3	(11) Frits Koppe	5		1						2			1			1			5
3	(12) Henny Kroeze	9	3						2					1	3				9
3	(19) Wil Stroes	0															0	0	0
4	Italy	10	0	0	3	3	3	4	4	4	5	6	6	6	7	7	9	10		10	10	10	10
4	(1) Francesco Biginato	0				F				-				-				-	0
4	(2) Giuseppe Marzotto	5			3				0				0				2		5
4	(3) Mauro Ferraccioli	3		0				1				1			1				3
4	(4) Fausto Birbini	1	0				0				1					0			1
4	(17) Nicolo Andriolo	1								0				0				1	1
Placing	Team / Rider name	Total	1	2	3	4	5	6	7	8	9	10	11	12	13	14	15	16	Pts	17	18	19	20

M - exclusion for exceeding two-minute time allowance • T - exclusion for touching the tapes • X - other exclusion • E - retired or mechanical failure • F - fell

Helmet colours were permanent for each team (Red, Blue, White and Yellow/Black). Colours in diagrams indicate gate positions:
gate A – inside	gate B	gate C	gate D – outside

* West Germany & Soviet Union to Continental Final

== Qualification Stage 2 ==
Day	Venue	Winner
Stage 2
5 July	(Denmark) Speedway Center, Vojens	England
13 July	(West Germany) Hansa Stadium, Bremen	Poland

=== Continental Final ===
- 13 July
- (West Germany) Hansa Stadium, Bremen
- Referee: (Denmark) Mr. Kristensen

Placing	Team / Rider name	Total	1	2	3	4	5	6	7	8	9	10	11	12	13	14	15	16	Pts	17	18	19	20
1	Poland	36	2	5	8	10	12	13	15	18	20	23	25	28	30	32	33	36		36	36	36	36
1	(9) Zenon Plech	11			3		2					3						3	11
1	(10) Jerzy Rembas	5				2		1			2						-		5
1	(11) Roman Jankowski	10		3						3			2			2			10
1	(12) Edward Jancarz	9	2						2					3	2				9
1	(19) Andrzej Huszcza	1															1		1
2	Czechoslovakia	29	3	3	5	8	9	12	15	16	17	19	22	23	26	27	29	29		29	29	29	29
2	(1) Jiří Štancl	5				3				1				1				0	5
2	(2) Václav Verner	10			2				3				3				2		10
2	(3) Aleš Dryml Sr.	8		F				3				2			3				8
2	(4) Petr Ondrašík	6	3				1				1					1			6
2	(17) Zdeněk Kudrna	0																	0
3	West Germany	26	1	3	4	5	8	10	11	13	16	17	18	20	21	24	24	26		26	26	26	26
3	(13) Egon Müller	8		2					1		3							2	8
3	(14) Waldemar Bacik	4	1							2		1					F		4
3	(15) Georg Hack	8			1			2						2		3			8
3	(16) Alois Wiesböck	6				1	3						1		1				6
3	(20) Christoph Betzl	0																	0
4	Soviet Union	5	0	1	1	1	1	1	1	1	1	1	1	1	1	1	4	5		5	5	5	5
4	(5) Nikolay Kornev	0	0					0					0					-	0
4	(6) Valery Gordeev	1		1			0							0			-		1
4	(7) Mikhail Starostin	0				0			F			0				0			0
4	(8) Grigory Khlinovsky	0			0					0	0				0				0
4	(18) Viktor Kuznetsov	4															3	1	4
Placing	Team / Rider name	Total	1	2	3	4	5	6	7	8	9	10	11	12	13	14	15	16	Pts	17	18	19	20

M - exclusion for exceeding two-minute time allowance • T - exclusion for touching the tapes • X - other exclusion • E - retired or mechanical failure • F - fell

Helmet colours were permanent for each team (Red, Blue, White and Yellow/Black). Colours in diagrams indicate gate positions:
gate A – inside	gate B	gate C	gate D – outside

* Poland & Czechoslovakia to World Final

=== Intercontinental Final ===
- 5 July
- (Denmark) Speedway Center, Vojens
- Att: 8,000

Placing	Team / Rider name	Total	1	2	3	4	5	6	7	8	9	10	11	12	13	14	15	16	Pts	17	18	19	20
1	England	33	2	3	6	9	9	11	14	17	18	20	21	24	25	28	30	33		33	33	33	33
1	(1) Dave Jessup	12				3				3				3				3	12
1	(2) Peter Collins	9			3				3				1				2		9
1	(3) Chris Morton	6		1				2				2			1				6
1	(4) Michael Lee	6	2				0				1					3			6
1	(17) Kenny Carter	0																	0
2	United States	32	3	6	7	9	11	14	14	16	19	20	23	23	26	27	30	32		32	32	32	32
2	(5) Bruce Penhall	11	3					3					3					2	11
2	(6) Scott Autrey	8		3			2							E			3		8
2	(7) Bobby Schwartz	3				2			0			-				1			3
2	(8) Dennis Sigalos	9			1					2	3				3				9
2	(18) Kelly Moran	1										1							1
3	Denmark	25	1	1	3	4	7	8	9	10	12	15	17	19	21	23	24	25		25	25	25	25
3	(9) Ole Olsen	9			2		3					3						1	9
3	(10) Erik Gundersen	5				1		1			2						1		5
3	(11) Bo Petersen	4		E						-			2			2			4
3	(12) Hans Nielsen	6	1						1					2	2				6
3	(19) Tommy Knudsen	1								1									1
4	Sweden	5	0	2	2	2	3	3	5	5	5	5	5	5	5	5	5	5		5	5	5	5
4	(13) Jan Andersson	4		2					2		0							0	4
4	(14) Richard Hellsen	0	0							X		0					0		0
4	(15) Tommy Johansson	0			F			-						-		-			0
4	(16) Hans Danielsson	1				0	1						F		0				1
4	(20) Lillebror Johansson	0						E						E		0			0
Placing	Team / Rider name	Total	1	2	3	4	5	6	7	8	9	10	11	12	13	14	15	16	Pts	17	18	19	20

M - exclusion for exceeding two-minute time allowance • T - exclusion for touching the tapes • X - other exclusion • E - retired or mechanical failure • F - fell

Helmet colours were permanent for each team (Red, Blue, White and Yellow/Black). Colours in diagrams indicate gate positions:
gate A – inside	gate B	gate C	gate D – outside

* England & USA to World Final

== World Final ==
- 21 September
- POL Olympic Stadium, Wrocław
- Att: 55,000

Placing	Team / Rider name	Total	1	2	3	4	5	6	7	8	9	10	11	12	13	14	15	16	Pts	17	18	19	20
1	England	40	2	5	8	10	13	15	18	21	24	27	28	29	32	35	38	40		40	40	40	40
1	(1) Dave Jessup	8				2				3				1				2	8
1	(2) Peter Collins	10			3				3				1				3		10
1	(3) Chris Morton	11		3				2				3			3				11
1	(4) Michael Lee	11	2				3				3					3			11
1	(17) John Davis	0																	0
2	United States	29	3	5	5	6	8	11	11	13	14	14	17	20	22	24	26	29		29	29	29	29
2	(5) Bruce Penhall	12	3					3					3					3	12
2	(6) Scott Autrey	9		2			2							3			2		9
2	(7) Bobby Schwartz	3				1			0			-				2			3
2	(8) Dennis Sigalos	5			0					2	1				2				5
2	(18) Ron Preston	0										0							0
3	Poland	15	0	1	3	6	6	7	8	8	10	12	12	14	14	14	14	15		15	15	15	15
3	(13) Roman Jankowski	5		1					1		2							1	5
3	(14) Andrzej Huszcza	2	F							-		2					0		2
3	(15) Zenon Plech	5			2			1						2		F			5
3	(16) Edward Jancarz	3				3	0						-		0				3
3	(20) Jerzy Rembas	0								E			0						0
4	Czechoslovakia	12	1	1	2	2	3	3	5	6	6	7	9	9	10	11	12	12		12	12	12	12
4	(9) Václav Verner	3			1		1					1						E	3
4	(10) Aleš Dryml Sr.	1				X		0			-						1		1
4	(11) Petr Ondrašík	3		0						-			2			1			3
4	(12) Jiří Štancl	4	1						2					0	1				4
4	(19) Zdeněk Kudrna	1								1	0								1
Placing	Team / Rider name	Total	1	2	3	4	5	6	7	8	9	10	11	12	13	14	15	16	Pts	17	18	19	20

M - exclusion for exceeding two-minute time allowance • T - exclusion for touching the tapes • X - other exclusion • E - retired or mechanical failure • F - fell

Helmet colours were permanent for each team (Red, Blue, White and Yellow/Black). Colours in diagrams indicate gate positions:
gate A – inside	gate B	gate C	gate D – outside

== See also ==
- 1980 Individual Speedway World Championship
- 1980 Speedway World Pairs Championship
