= 1977 Individual Long Track World Championship =

Long track motorcycle racing event

The 1977 Individual Long Track World Championship was the seventh edition of the FIM speedway Individual Long Track World Championship. The event was held on 11 September 1977 in Aalborg, Denmark.

The world title was won by Anders Michanek of Sweden.

== Final Classification ==
Pos	Rider	Heat Pts	Heat Pts	Heat Pts	Heat Pts	Heat Pts	Total Pts
1	(Sweden) Anders Michanek	5	4	5	2	4	20
2	(West Germany) Hans Siegl	3	2	5	3	5	18
3	(Denmark) Ole Olsen	5	5	1	4	3	18
4	(Czechoslovakia) Jiří Štancl	4	2	3	4	2	15
5	(West Germany) Joachim Kall	5	3	3	3	-	14
6	(West Germany) Alois Wiesböck	4	3	5	1	-	13
7	(Denmark) Kristian Præstbro	3	5	3	1	E	12
8	(Czechoslovakia) Aleš Dryml Sr.	2	1	4	5	E	12
9	(New Zealand) Ivan Mauger	4	4	4	0	E	12
10	(West Germany) Georg Hack	2	4	ef	5	E	11
11	(West Germany) Christoph Betzl	3	5	1	0	E	9
12	(Czechoslovakia) Zdeněk Kudrna	1	1	4	2	E	8
13	(West Germany) Hans Wassermann	ef	3	2	E	E	5
14	(Czechoslovakia) Jan Verner	2	0	2	E	E	4
15	(Czechoslovakia) Václav Verner	1	0	2	E	E	3
16	(West Germany) Jan Kater	0	1	1	E	E	2
17	(Austria) Otto Lantenhammer	ef	2	ef	E	E	2
18	(West Germany) Egon Müller	ef	0	ef	E	E	0

Key

- E = eliminated (no further ride)
- f = fell
- ef = engine failure
