= 1978 Speedway World Team Cup =

19th edition of the annual motorcycle speedway World Cup competition

Seasons
- ← 1977 1979 →

The 1978 Speedway World Team Cup was the 19th edition of the FIM Speedway World Team Cup to determine the team world champions.

The final took place at the Ellermühle Speedway Stadium in Landshut, West Germany. Denmark won their first title defeating defending champions England, who finished in second place.

== Qualification Stage 1 ==
=== British & Commonwealth Round ===
- May 21
- (England) Smallmead Stadium, Reading
- Referee: (England) A. Humphrey

| Placing | Team / Rider name | Total | 1 | 2 | 3 | 4 | 5 | 6 | 7 | 8 | 9 | 10 | 11 | 12 | 13 | 14 | 15 | 16 | Pts | 17 | 18 | 19 | 20 |
| 1 | England | 43 | 3 | 6 | 9 | 12 | 15 | 18 | 21 | 24 | 26 | 26 | 29 | 32 | 35 | 38 | 41 | 43 | | 43 | 43 | 43 | 43 |
| 1 | (5) Malcolm Simmons | 11 | 3 | | | | | 3 | | | | | 3 | | | | | 2 | 11 |
| 1 | (6) Peter Collins | 12 | | 3 | | | 3 | | | | | | | 3 | | | 3 | | 12 |
| 1 | (7) Dave Jessup | 9 | | | | 3 | | | 3 | | | 0 | | | | 3 | | | 9 |
| 1 | (8) Gordon Kennett | 11 | | | 3 | | | | | 3 | 2 | | | | 3 | | | | 11 |
| 1 | (18) John Davis | 0 | | | | | | | | | | | | | | | | | 0 |
| 2 | Australia | 21 | 0 | 2 | 2 | 2 | 3 | 5 | 7 | 9 | 12 | 15 | 16 | 18 | 18 | 19 | 21 | 21 | | 21 | 21 | 21 | 21 |
| 2 | (1) Phil Crump | 4 | | | | E | | | | 2 | | | | 2 | | | | 0 | 4 |
| 2 | (2) Phil Herne | 0 | | | 0 | | | | - | | | | - | | | | - | | 0 |
| 2 | (3) John Boulger | 7 | | 2 | | | | 2 | | | | 3 | | | F | | | | 7 |
| 2 | (4) Billy Sanders | 2 | 0 | | | | 1 | | | | - | | | | | 1 | | | 2 |
| 2 | (17) John Titman | 8 | | | | | | | 2 | | 3 | | 1 | | | | 2 | | 8 |
| 3 | United States | 20 | 1 | 1 | 3 | 5 | 7 | 8 | 9 | 10 | 11 | 13 | 15 | 15 | 17 | 17 | 17 | 20 | | 20 | 20 | 20 | 20 |
| 3 | (9) Scott Autrey | 9 | | | 2 | | 2 | | | | | 2 | | | | | | 3 | 9 |
| 3 | (10) Steve Gresham | 4 | | | | 2 | | 1 | | | 1 | | | | | | - | | 4 |
| 3 | (11) Bruce Penhall | 3 | | 0 | | | | | | 1 | | | 2 | | | 0 | | | 3 |
| 3 | (12) Mike Curoso | 4 | 1 | | | | | | 1 | | | | | 0 | 2 | | | | 4 |
| 3 | (19) Jim Gresham | 0 | | | | | | | | | | | | | | | 0 | | 0 |
| 4 | New Zealand | 12 | 2 | 3 | 4 | 5 | 5 | 5 | 5 | 5 | 5 | 6 | 6 | 7 | 8 | 10 | 11 | 12 | | 12 | 12 | 12 | 12 |
| 4 | (13) Larry Ross | 2 | | 1 | | | | | 0 | | 0 | | | | | | | 1 | 2 |
| 4 | (14) Mitch Shirra | 4 | 2 | | | | | | | 0 | | 1 | | | | | 1 | | 4 |
| 4 | (15) Bruce Cribb | 4 | | | 1 | | | F | | | | | | 1 | | 2 | | | 4 |
| 4 | (16) Roger Abel | 2 | | | | 1 | - | | | | | | - | | 1 | | | | 2 |
| 4 | (20) Cliff Anderson | 0 | | | | | | | | | | | 0 | | | | | | 0 |
| Placing | Team / Rider name | Total | 1 | 2 | 3 | 4 | 5 | 6 | 7 | 8 | 9 | 10 | 11 | 12 | 13 | 14 | 15 | 16 | Pts | 17 | 18 | 19 | 20 |

M - exclusion for exceeding two-minute time allowance • T - exclusion for touching the tapes • X - other exclusion • E - retired or mechanical failure • F - fell

Helmet colours were permanent for each team (Red, Blue, White and Yellow/Black). Colours in diagrams indicate gate positions:
| gate A – inside | gate B | gate C | gate D – outside |

* England and Australia to Intercontinental Final

=== Scandinavian Round ===
- June 4
- (Finland) Tampere Stadium, Tampere
- Att: 2,000

| 1st | 2nd | 3rd | 4th |
|---|---|---|---|
| Denmark - 34; Finn Thomsen - 11; Mike Lohmann - 9 Hans Nielsen - 8 Ole Olsen - 6 | Sweden - 33; Bernt Persson - 11; Jan Andersson - 9 Tommy Nilsson - 9 Sören Karlsson - 2 Bo Wirebrand - 2 | Finland - 21; Kai Niemi - 7 Seppo Palomaki - 5 Ila Teromaa - 5 Rauli Makinen - 4 Ari Koponen - 0 | Norway - 6 Rolf Gramstad - 4 Sigvart Pedersen - 1 Trond Helge Skretting - 1 Audun Ove Olsen - 0 Stein Roar Pedersen - 0 |

* Denmark and Sweden to Intercontinental Final

=== Continental Round ===
- May 21
- (Austria) Stadion Wiener Neustadt, Wiener Neustadt

| 1st | 2nd | 3rd | 4th |
|---|---|---|---|
| West Germany - 38; Alois Wiesböck - 12; Georg Hack - 9 Hans Wassermann - 9 Egon Müller - 8 | Italy - 29; Giuseppe Marzotto - 10; Francesco Biginato - 7 Mauro Ferraccioli - 7 Sandro Pastorelli - 5 | Hungary - 15; Laszlo Meszaros - 6 Istvan Sziraczki - 6 Janos Oresko - 2 Janos Jakob - 1 | Austria - 14; Josef Haider - 6 Adi Funk - 3 Herbert Szerecs - 2 Gunther Walla - 2 Hubert Fischbacher - 1 |

* West Germany and Italy to Continental Semifinal

- May 21
- (Socialist Federal Republic of Yugoslavia) Mladost Stadum, Prelog

| Placing | Team / Rider name | Total | 1 | 2 | 3 | 4 | 5 | 6 | 7 | 8 | 9 | 10 | 11 | 12 | 13 | 14 | 15 | 16 | Pts | 17 | 18 | 19 | 20 |
| 1 | Soviet Union | 32 | 0 | 3 | 3 | 6 | 8 | 10 | 13 | 16 | 18 | 20 | 21 | 23 | 24 | 27 | 29 | 32 | | 32 | 32 | 32 | 32 |
| 1 | (5) Grigory Khlinovsky | 6 | F | | | | | 2 | | | | | 1 | | | | | 3 | 6 |
| 1 | (6) Vladimir Paznikov | 9 | | 3 | | | 2 | | | | | | | 2 | | | 2 | | 9 |
| 1 | (7) Mikhail Starostin | 11 | | | | 3 | | | 3 | | | 2 | | | | 3 | | | 11 |
| 1 | (8) Nikolay Kornev | 6 | | | F | | | | | 3 | 2 | | | | 1 | | | | 6 |
| 1 | (18) Oleg Rakhimov | 0 | | | | | | | | | | | | | | | | | 0 |
| 2 | (Netherlands) Nederlands | 32 | 3 | 5 | 8 | 10 | 13 | 16 | 18 | 19 | 22 | 23 | 26 | 26 | 28 | 30 | 30 | 32 | | 32 | 32 | 32 | 32 |
| 2 | (9) Henk Steman | 7 | | | 3 | | 3 | | | | | 1 | | | | | | - | 7 |
| 2 | (10) Henny Kroeze | 8 | | | | 2 | | 3 | | | 3 | | | | | | X | | 8 |
| 2 | (11) Frits Koning | 5 | | 2 | | | | | | 1 | | | - | | | 2 | | | 5 |
| 2 | (12) Frits Koppe | 7 | 3 | | | | | | 2 | | | | | 0 | 2 | | | | 7 |
| 2 | (19) Rudi Muts | 5 | | | | | | | | | | | 3 | | | | | 2 | 5 |
| 3 | Bulgaria | 27 | 2 | 3 | 5 | 6 | 7 | 8 | 9 | 11 | 12 | 15 | 17 | 20 | 23 | 23 | 26 | 27 | | 27 | 27 | 27 | 27 |
| 3 | (1) Angel Eftimov | 7 | | | | 1 | | | | 2 | | | | 3 | | | | 1 | 7 |
| 3 | (2) Orlin Janakiev | 8 | | | 2 | | | | 1 | | | | 2 | | | | 3 | | 8 |
| 3 | (3) Nikolai Cvetkov | 8 | | 1 | | | | 1 | | | | 3 | | | 3 | | | | 8 |
| 3 | (4) Atanas Stojanov | 4 | 2 | | | | 1 | | | | 1 | | | | | F | | | 4 |
| 3 | (17) Nikolai Parvanov | 0 | | | | | | | | | | | | | | | | | 0 |
| 4 | (Socialist Federal Republic of Yugoslavia) Yugoslavia | 5 | 1 | 1 | 2 | 2 | 2 | 2 | 2 | 2 | 2 | 2 | 2 | 3 | 3 | 4 | 5 | 5 | | 5 | 5 | 5 | 5 |
| 4 | (13) Vlado Kocuvan | 0 | | 0 | | | | | 0 | | 0 | | | | | | | 0 | 0 |
| 4 | (14) Stefan Kekec | 2 | 1 | | | | | | | 0 | | 0 | | | | | 1 | | 2 |
| 4 | (15) Djuro Fleten | 3 | | | 1 | | | 0 | | | | | | 1 | | 1 | | | 3 |
| 4 | (16) Ivan Posedi | 0 | | | | 0 | 0 | | | | | | 0 | | 0 | | | | 0 |
| 4 | (20) Darko Tominac | 0 | | | | | | | | | | | | | | | | | 0 |
| Placing | Team / Rider name | Total | 1 | 2 | 3 | 4 | 5 | 6 | 7 | 8 | 9 | 10 | 11 | 12 | 13 | 14 | 15 | 16 | Pts | 17 | 18 | 19 | 20 |

M - exclusion for exceeding two-minute time allowance • T - exclusion for touching the tapes • X - other exclusion • E - retired or mechanical failure • F - fell

Helmet colours were permanent for each team (Red, Blue, White and Yellow/Black). Colours in diagrams indicate gate positions:
| gate A – inside | gate B | gate C | gate D – outside |

* Soviet Union and Nederlands to Continental Semifinal

Semifinal

- July 17
- (West Germany) Abensberg Stadion, Abensberg
- Att: 18,000

| Placing | Team / Rider name | Total | 1 | 2 | 3 | 4 | 5 | 6 | 7 | 8 | 9 | 10 | 11 | 12 | 13 | 14 | 15 | 16 | Pts | 17 | 18 | 19 | 20 |
| 1 | Soviet Union | 34 | 2 | 2 | 4 | 7 | 10 | 12 | 14 | 15 | 18 | 21 | 22 | 25 | 28 | 29 | 32 | 34 | | 34 | 34 | 34 | 34 |
| 1 | (9) Grigory Khlinovsky | 10 | | | 2 | | 3 | | | | | 3 | | | | | | 2 | 10 |
| 1 | (10) Vladimir Paznikov | 0 | | | | | | | | | | | | | | | | | 0 |
| 1 | (11) Nikolay Kornev | 3 | | X | | | | | | 1 | | | 1 | | | 1 | | | 3 |
| 1 | (12) Mikhail Starostin | 10 | 2 | | | | | | 2 | | | | | 3 | 3 | | | | 10 |
| 1 | (19) Valery Gordeev | 11 | | | | 3 | | 2 | | | 3 | | | | | | 3 | | 11 |
| 2 | West Germany | 27 | 0 | 3 | 6 | 8 | 8 | 8 | 11 | 14 | 14 | 16 | 19 | 20 | 20 | 22 | 24 | 27 | | 27 | 27 | 27 | 27 |
| 2 | (1) Georg Hack | 9 | | | | 2 | | | | 3 | | | | 1 | | | | 3 | 9 |
| 2 | (2) Egon Muller | 11 | | | 3 | | | | 3 | | | | 3 | | | | 2 | | 11 |
| 2 | (3) Waldemar Bacik | 5 | | 3 | | | | F | | | | 2 | | | 0 | | | | 5 |
| 2 | (4) Alois Wiesböck | 2 | 0 | | | | 0 | | | | X | | | | | 2 | | | 2 |
| 2 | (17) Georg Gilgenreiner | 0 | | | | | | | | | | | | | | | | | 0 |
| 3 | (Netherlands) Nederlands | 20 | 3 | 4 | 5 | 6 | 8 | 11 | 11 | 11 | 13 | 13 | 15 | 15 | 16 | 19 | 19 | 20 | | 20 | 20 | 20 | 20 |
| 3 | (5) Henny Kroeze | 9 | 3 | | | | | 3 | | | | | 2 | | | | | 1 | 9 |
| 3 | (6) Rudi Muts | 3 | | 1 | | | 2 | | | | | | | F | | | F | | 3 |
| 3 | (7) Frits Koppe | 4 | | | | 1 | | | 0 | | | - | | | | 3 | | | 4 |
| 3 | (8) Henk Steman | 4 | | | 1 | | | | | 0 | 2 | | | | 1 | | | | 4 |
| 3 | (18) Frits Koning | 0 | | | | | | | | | | 0 | | | | | | | 0 |
| 4 | Italy | 15 | 1 | 3 | 3 | 3 | 4 | 5 | 6 | 8 | 9 | 10 | 10 | 12 | 14 | 14 | 15 | 15 | | 15 | 15 | 15 | 15 |
| 4 | (13) Francesco Biginato | 4 | | 2 | | | | | 1 | | 1 | | | | | | | 0 | 4 |
| 4 | (14) Giuseppe Marzotto | 5 | 1 | | | | | | | 2 | | 1 | | | | | 1 | | 5 |
| 4 | (15) Mauro Ferraccioli | 3 | | | 0 | | | 1 | | | | | | 2 | | 0 | | | 3 |
| 4 | (16) Sandro Pastorelli | 3 | | | | 0 | 1 | | | | | | E | | 2 | | | | 3 |
| 4 | (20) Dario Famari | 0 | | | | | | | | | | | | | | | | | 0 |
| Placing | Team / Rider name | Total | 1 | 2 | 3 | 4 | 5 | 6 | 7 | 8 | 9 | 10 | 11 | 12 | 13 | 14 | 15 | 16 | Pts | 17 | 18 | 19 | 20 |

M - exclusion for exceeding two-minute time allowance • T - exclusion for touching the tapes • X - other exclusion • E - retired or mechanical failure • F - fell

Helmet colours were permanent for each team (Red, Blue, White and Yellow/Black). Colours in diagrams indicate gate positions:
| gate A – inside | gate B | gate C | gate D – outside |

* Soviet Union and West Germany to Continental Final

== Qualification Stage 2 ==
=== Continental Final ===
- July 29
- (Soviet Union) Leningrad Speedway Stadium, Leningrad

| Placing | Team / Rider name | Total | 1 | 2 | 3 | 4 | 5 | 6 | 7 | 8 | 9 | 10 | 11 | 12 | 13 | 14 | 15 | 16 | Pts | 17 | 18 | 19 | 20 |
| 1 | Poland | 31 | 1 | 2 | 5 | 8 | 8 | 11 | 14 | 17 | 17 | 17 | 20 | 23 | 25 | 27 | 29 | 31 | | 31 | 31 | 31 | 31 |
| 1 | (1) Edward Jancarz | 11 | | | | 3 | | | | 3 | | | | 3 | | | | 2 | 11 |
| 1 | (2) Marek Cieślak | 11 | | | 3 | | | | 3 | | | | 3 | | | | 2 | | 11 |
| 1 | (3) Bolesław Proch | 6 | | 1 | | | | 3 | | | | 0 | | | 2 | | | | 6 |
| 1 | (4) Andrzej Huszcza | 1 | 1 | | | | - | | | | 0 | | | | | - | | | 1 |
| 1 | (17) Jerzy Rembas | 2 | | | | | 0 | | | | | | | | | 2 | | | 2 |
| 2 | Czechoslovakia | 27 | 0 | 3 | 5 | 5 | 6 | 8 | 9 | 9 | 12 | 15 | 17 | 18 | 21 | 24 | 27 | 27 | | 27 | 27 | 27 | 27 |
| 2 | (5) Jiří Štancl | 4 | E | | | | | 2 | | | | | 2 | | | | | E | 4 |
| 2 | (6) Jan Verner | 8 | | 3 | | | 1 | | | | | | | 1 | | | 3 | | 8 |
| 2 | (7) Václav Verner | 7 | | | | E | | | 1 | | | 3 | | | | 3 | | | 7 |
| 2 | (8) Aleš Dryml Sr. | 8 | | | 2 | | | | | 0 | 3 | | | | 3 | | | | 8 |
| 2 | (18) Petr Ondrašík | 0 | | | | | | | | | | | | | | | | | 0 |
| 3 | Soviet Union | 22 | 3 | 5 | 6 | 7 | 9 | 10 | 12 | 14 | 15 | 17 | 18 | 20 | 20 | 21 | 21 | 22 | | 22 | 22 | 22 | 22 |
| 3 | (13) Nikolay Kornev | 5 | | 2 | | | | | 2 | | 1 | | | | | | | - | 5 |
| 3 | (14) Mikhail Starostin | 7 | 3 | | | | | | | 2 | | 2 | | | | | 0 | | 7 |
| 3 | (15) Vladimir Smirnov | 2 | | | 1 | | | 1 | | | | | | - | | - | | | 2 |
| 3 | (16) Grigory Khlinovsky | 2 | | | | 1 | - | | | | | | 1 | | 0 | | | | 2 |
| 3 | (20) Valery Gordeev | 6 | | | | | 2 | | | | | | | 2 | | 1 | | 1 | 6 |
| 4 | West Germany | 16 | 2 | 2 | 2 | 4 | 7 | 7 | 7 | 8 | 10 | 11 | 11 | 11 | 12 | 12 | 13 | 16 | | 16 | 16 | 16 | 16 |
| 4 | (9) Waldemar Bacik | 7 | | | 0 | | 3 | | | | | 1 | | | | | | 3 | 7 |
| 4 | (10) Georg Hack | 5 | | | | 2 | | F | | | 2 | | | | | | 1 | | 5 |
| 4 | (11) Georg Gilgenreiner | 1 | | 0 | | | | | | 1 | | | F | | | 0 | | | 1 |
| 4 | (12) Alois Wiesböck | 3 | 2 | | | | | | 0 | | | | | 0 | 1 | | | | 3 |
| 4 | (19) - | 0 | | | | | | | | | | | | | | | | | 0 |
| Placing | Team / Rider name | Total | 1 | 2 | 3 | 4 | 5 | 6 | 7 | 8 | 9 | 10 | 11 | 12 | 13 | 14 | 15 | 16 | Pts | 17 | 18 | 19 | 20 |

M - exclusion for exceeding two-minute time allowance • T - exclusion for touching the tapes • X - other exclusion • E - retired or mechanical failure • F - fell

Helmet colours were permanent for each team (Red, Blue, White and Yellow/Black). Colours in diagrams indicate gate positions:
| gate A – inside | gate B | gate C | gate D – outside |

* Poland and Czechoslovakia to World Final

=== Intercontinental Final ===
- June 18
- (England) Hyde Road, Manchester
- Referee: (Norway) Tore Kittilsen

| Placing | Team / Rider name | Total | 1 | 2 | 3 | 4 | 5 | 6 | 7 | 8 | 9 | 10 | 11 | 12 | 13 | 14 | 15 | 16 | Pts | 17 | 18 | 19 | 20 |
| 1 | England | 33 | 0 | 1 | 4 | 5 | 7 | 10 | 13 | 16 | 17 | 20 | 23 | 25 | 28 | 31 | 33 | 33 | | 33 | 33 | 33 | 33 |
| 1 | (1) Peter Collins | 6 | | | | 1 | | | | 3 | | | | 2 | | | | E | 6 |
| 1 | (2) Malcolm Simmons | 11 | | | 3 | | | | 3 | | | | 3 | | | | 2 | | 11 |
| 1 | (3) Michael Lee | 10 | | 1 | | | | 3 | | | | 3 | | | 3 | | | | 10 |
| 1 | (4) Dave Jessup | 0 | 0 | | | | - | | | | - | | | | | - | | | 0 |
| 1 | (17) John Davis | 6 | | | | | 2 | | | | 1 | | | | | 3 | | | 6 |
| 2 | Denmark | 25 | 2 | 5 | 6 | 6 | 9 | 10 | 11 | 13 | 15 | 15 | 15 | 18 | 18 | 20 | 23 | 25 | | 25 | 25 | 25 | 25 |
| 2 | (5) Mike Lohmann | 5 | 2 | | | | | 1 | | | | | E | | | | | 2 | 5 |
| 2 | (6) Ole Olsen | 12 | | 3 | | | 3 | | | | | | | 3 | | | 3 | | 12 |
| 2 | (7) Finn Thomsen | 3 | | | | 0 | | | 1 | | | - | | | | 2 | | | 3 |
| 2 | (8) Hans Nielsen | 5 | | | 1 | | | | | 2 | 2 | | | | 0 | | | | 5 |
| 2 | (18) Alf Busk | 0 | | | | | | | | | | 0 | | | | | | | 0 |
| 3 | Sweden | 23 | 3 | 5 | 7 | 10 | 11 | 11 | 13 | 14 | 17 | 18 | 19 | 19 | 20 | 20 | 20 | 23 | | 23 | 23 | 23 | 23 |
| 3 | (13) Anders Michanek | 10 | | 2 | | | | | 2 | | 3 | | | | | | | 3 | 10 |
| 3 | (14) Jan Andersson | 5 | 3 | | | | | | | 1 | | 1 | | | | | 0 | | 5 |
| 3 | (15) Christer Sjösten | 2 | | | 2 | | | E | | | | | | 0 | | 0 | | | 2 |
| 3 | (16) Bernt Persson | 6 | | | | 3 | 1 | | | | | | 1 | | 1 | | | | 6 |
| 3 | (20) Sören Karlsson | 0 | | | | | | | | | | | | | | | | | 0 |
| 4 | Australia | 15 | 1 | 1 | 1 | 3 | 3 | 5 | 5 | 5 | 5 | 7 | 9 | 10 | 12 | 13 | 14 | 15 | | 15 | 15 | 15 | 15 |
| 4 | (9) Phil Crump | 1 | | | 0 | | 0 | | | | | - | | | | | | 1 | 1 |
| 4 | (10) John Titman | 5 | | | | 2 | | 2 | | | 0 | | | | | | 1 | | 5 |
| 4 | (11) John Boulger | 2 | | 0 | | | | | | 0 | | | 2 | | | - | | | 2 |
| 4 | (12) Phil Herne | 3 | 1 | | | | | | 0 | | | | | - | 2 | | | | 3 |
| 4 | (19) Mick McKeon | 4 | | | | | | | | | | 2 | | 1 | | 1 | | | 4 |
| Placing | Team / Rider name | Total | 1 | 2 | 3 | 4 | 5 | 6 | 7 | 8 | 9 | 10 | 11 | 12 | 13 | 14 | 15 | 16 | Pts | 17 | 18 | 19 | 20 |

M - exclusion for exceeding two-minute time allowance • T - exclusion for touching the tapes • X - other exclusion • E - retired or mechanical failure • F - fell

Helmet colours were permanent for each team (Red, Blue, White and Yellow/Black). Colours in diagrams indicate gate positions:
| gate A – inside | gate B | gate C | gate D – outside |

* England and Denmark to World Final

== World Final ==
- September 16
- (West Germany) Landshut, Stadion Ellermühle
- Referee: (Norway) Tore Kittilsen
- Att: 7,000

| Placing | Team / Rider name | Total | 1 | 2 | 3 | 4 | 5 | 6 | 7 | 8 | 9 | 10 | 11 | 12 | 13 | 14 | 15 | 16 | Pts | 17 | 18 | 19 | 20 |
| 1 | Denmark | 37 | 2 | 4 | 7 | 10 | 12 | 13 | 16 | 19 | 22 | 23 | 26 | 27 | 30 | 32 | 35 | 37 | | 37 | 37 | 37 | 37 |
| 1 | (13) Ole Olsen | 10 | | 2 | | | | | 3 | | 3 | | | | | | | 2 | 10 |
| 1 | (14) Mike Lohmann | 9 | 2 | | | | | | | 3 | | 1 | | | | | 3 | | 9 |
| 1 | (15) Finn Thomsen | 7 | | | 3 | | | 1 | | | | | | 1 | | 2 | | | 7 |
| 1 | (16) Hans Nielsen | 11 | | | | 3 | 2 | | | | | | 3 | | 3 | | | | 11 |
| 1 | (20) Kristian Præstbro | 0 | | | | | | | | | | | | | | | | | 0 |
| 2 | England | 27 | 3 | 3 | 4 | 4 | 7 | 10 | 10 | 12 | 13 | 16 | 18 | 21 | 22 | 25 | 27 | 27 | | 27 | 27 | 27 | 27 |
| 2 | (5) Malcolm Simmons | 8 | 3 | | | | | 3 | | | | | 2 | | | | | E | 8 |
| 2 | (6) Dave Jessup | 5 | | 0 | | | - | | | | | | | 3 | | | 2 | | 5 |
| 2 | (7) Peter Collins | 6 | | | | 0 | | | 0 | | | 3 | | | | 3 | | | 6 |
| 2 | (8) Gordon Kennett | 3 | | | 1 | | | | | 2 | - | | | | - | | | | 3 |
| 2 | (18) Michael Lee | 5 | | | | | 3 | | | | 1 | | | | 1 | | | | 5 |
| 3 | Poland | 19 | 1 | 4 | 4 | 6 | 7 | 7 | 8 | 9 | 9 | 9 | 9 | 11 | 13 | 14 | 15 | 16 | | 19 | 19 | 19 | 19 |
| 3 | (1) Edward Jancarz | 9 | | | | 2 | | | | 1 | | | | 2 | | | | 1 | 6 | 3 |
| 3 | (2) Zenon Plech | 1 | | | 0 | | | | 1 | | | | 0 | | | | - | | 1 |
| 3 | (3) Marek Cieślak | 5 | | 3 | | | | 0 | | | | 0 | | | 2 | | | | 5 |
| 3 | (4) Jerzy Rembas | 3 | 1 | | | | 1 | | | | 0 | | | | | 1 | | | 3 |
| 3 | (17) Andrzej Huszcza | 1 | | | | | | | | | | | | | | | 1 | | 1 |
| 4 | Czechoslovakia | 18 | 0 | 1 | 3 | 4 | 4 | 6 | 8 | 8 | 10 | 12 | 13 | 13 | 13 | 13 | 13 | 16 | | 18 | 18 | 18 | 18 |
| 4 | (9) Jiří Štancl | 9 | | | 2 | | 0 | | | | | 2 | | | | | | 3 | 7 | 2 |
| 4 | (10) Jan Verner | 5 | | | | 1 | | 2 | | | 2 | | | | | | X | | 5 |
| 4 | (11) Václav Verner | 2 | | 1 | | | | | | 0 | | | 1 | | | 0 | | | 2 |
| 4 | (12) Aleš Dryml Sr. | 2 | F | | | | | | 2 | | | | | 0 | 0 | | | | 2 |
| 4 | (19) Petr Ondrašík | 0 | | | | | | | | | | | | | | | | | 0 |
| Placing | Team / Rider name | Total | 1 | 2 | 3 | 4 | 5 | 6 | 7 | 8 | 9 | 10 | 11 | 12 | 13 | 14 | 15 | 16 | Pts | 17 | 18 | 19 | 20 |

M - exclusion for exceeding two-minute time allowance • T - exclusion for touching the tapes • X - other exclusion • E - retired or mechanical failure • F - fell

Helmet colours were permanent for each team (Red, Blue, White and Yellow/Black). Colours in diagrams indicate gate positions:
| gate A – inside | gate B | gate C | gate D – outside |

== See also ==
- 1978 Individual Speedway World Championship
- 1978 Speedway World Pairs Championship
