= 1976 Individual Long Track World Championship =

Motorcycle championship

The 1976 Individual Long Track World Championship was the sixth edition of the FIM speedway Individual Long Track World Championship. The event was held on 12 September 1976 in Mariánské Lázně, Czech Republic which was Czechoslovakia at the time.

The world title was won by Ivan Mauger of New Zealand for a third time.

== Final Classification ==
Pos	Rider	Heat Pts	Heat Pts	Heat Pts	Heat Pts	Heat Pts	Total Pts
1	(New Zealand) Ivan Mauger	6	6	6	6	2	26
2	(Denmark) Ole Olsen	4	6	6	6	3	25
3	(West Germany) Egon Müller	4	4	3	4	6	21
4	(West Germany) Alois Wiesböck	6	6	2	3	4	21
5	(Czechoslovakia) Jiří Štancl	4	4	4	3	1	16
6	(Czechoslovakia) Zdeněk Kudrna	3	4	3	4	f	14
7	(Sweden) Anders Michanek	3	3	4	2	E	12
8	(West Germany) Christoph Betzl	6	3	e.f	1	E	10
9	(West Germany) Josef Angermüller	1	2	4	2	E	9
10	(Czechoslovakia) Václav Verner	2	3	2	1	E	8
11	(New Zealand) Barry Briggs	1	x	6	f	E	7
12	(England) Don Godden	0	2	3	e.f	E	5
13	(Czechoslovakia) Emil Sova	2	1	2	E	E	5
14	(West Germany) Hans Wassermann	2	1	1	E	E	4
15	(West Germany) Wilhelm Duden	3	0	1	E	E	4
16	(Norway) Edgar Stangeland	1	2	0	E	E	3
17	(Czechoslovakia) Stanislav Kubíček	0	0	1	E	E	1
18	(Sweden) Conny Samuelsson	0	1	-	E	E	1
19	(Czechoslovakia) Jan Verner	-	-	0	E	E	0

Key

- E = eliminated (no further ride)
- f = fell
- e.f = engine failure
