= 1978 Individual Long Track World Championship =

Long track motorcycle racing event

The 1978 Individual Long Track World Championship was the eighth edition of the FIM speedway Individual Long Track World Championship. The event was held on 10 September 1978 in Mühldorf, West Germany.

The world title was won by Egon Müller of West Germany for third time after he defeated Alois Wiesböck in a run off for the gold medal. Ivan Mauger was unbeaten in his first four rides but then suffered engine problems and Peter Collins would have won the title but in his last race his chain broke and he had to push his bike over the line for one point.

== Final Classification ==
Pos	Rider	Heat Pts	Heat Pts	Heat Pts	Heat Pts	Heat Pts	Heat Pts	Total Pts
1	(West Germany) Egon Müller	4	3	4	5	5	5	26
2	(West Germany) Alois Wiesböck	5	4	4	4	4	5	26
3	(England) Peter Collins	5	4	4	5	5	1	24
4	(New Zealand) Ivan Mauger	5	5	5	5	2	2	24
5	(Denmark) Ole Olsen	3	3	5	4	4	4	23
6	(West Germany) Georg Hack	4	4	2	1	3	5	19
7	(West Germany) Karl Maier	5	2	3	4	3	ef	17
8	(Czechoslovakia) Jiri Jirout	0	2	3	ef	3	4	12
9	(Czechoslovakia) Jiří Štancl	3	ef	4	3	ns	1	11
10	(Czechoslovakia) Aleš Dryml Sr.	2	2	0	2	1	3	10
11	(United States) Scott Autrey	2	2	x	5	0	ef	9
12	(Denmark) Kristian Præstbro	3	1	1	0	3	1	9
13	(Czechoslovakia) Jan Verner	0	3	1	2	2	1	9
14	(England) Don Godden	1	1	2	2	2	0	8
15	(Czechoslovakia) Zdeněk Kudrna	0	1	1	1	3	1	7
16	(West Germany) Wilhelm Duden	0	2	3	ef	ef	ns	5
17	(Austria) Otto Lantenhammer	-	-	-	-	1	-	1

- ef = engine failure
- ns = Non starter
- x = excluded

== Run Off ==
- Gold medal - Müller beat Wiesböck
- Bronze medal - Collins beat Mauger
