= 1974 Individual Ice Speedway World Championship =

Motorcycle ice speedway race

Seasons
- ← 1973 1975 →

The 1974 Individual Ice Speedway World Championship was the ninth edition of the World Championship.

The winner was Milan Špinka of the Czechoslovakia.

== Final ==
- March 10
- SWE Nassjo

Pos.	Rider	Points	Details
1	(Czechoslovakia) Milan Špinka	15	
2	(Soviet Union) Vladimir Tsybrov	14	
3	(Soviet Union) Gabdrakhman Kadyrov	13	
4	(Soviet Union) Sergey Tarabanko	10	
5	(Soviet Union) Boris Samorodov	10	
6	(Sweden) Bo Kingren	10	
7	(Sweden) Hans Johansson	8	
8	(Czechoslovakia) Miroslav Verner	8	
9	(Sweden) Hans Dekker	6	
10	(Soviet Union) Vladimir Kochetov	6	
11	(Czechoslovakia) Stanislav Kubíček	5	
12	(Soviet Union) Anatoly Sukhov	5	
13	(Czechoslovakia) Zdeněk Kudrna	4	
14	(Czechoslovakia) Jan Verner	3	
15	(Austria) Thromund Strobl	3	
16	(Czechoslovakia) Aleš Dryml Sr.	0	
R1	(Sweden) Lars Dahlin	0	
