= Jiří Štancl =

Czech speedway rider (born 1949)

- Born: 18 November 1949 (age 77); Prague, Czechoslovakia
- Nationality: Czechoslovak

Career history

Czechoslovakia
- 1969–1985: Rudá Hvězda Praha

Great Britain
- 1976, 1978: Coventry Bees
- 1979–1980, 1982: Reading Racers

Individual honours
- 1970, 1972, 1973, 1974, 1975, 1976, 1977, 1978, 1979, 1980, 1981, 1983: Czech National Champion
- 1974, 1976, 1978, 1981, 1982: Golden Helmet of Pardubice
- 1982: Continental Champion

Team honours
- 1978, 1980: British League Champion
- 1976, 1978: Midland Cup

Jiří Štancl (born 18 November 1949) is a Czech former international motorcycle speedway rider. He earned 39 international caps for the Czechoslovakia national speedway team.

== Career ==
Štancl was born on 18 November 1949 in Prague, Czechoslovakia. He reached the final of the Speedway World Championship on nine occasions between 1971 and 1984, finishing a career best 9th in 1982 in Los Angeles.

Štancl won the Czechoslovak National Championship twelve times, has appeared in the World Team Cup finals on seven occasions and in the Speedway World Pairs Championship finals seven times.

In 1974, Štancl represented his country in a test series against England. This was also the first time that he reached the world longtrack final. He would go on to compete in 12 consecutive finals.

Štancl won the famed Golden Helmet of Pardubice in 1974, 1976, 1978, 1981 and 1982 and was also twice runner-up at the World Longtrack Championships in 1983 and 1985.

In the British leagues, Štancl rode for the Coventry Bees and Reading Racers.

== Family ==
Štancl's son, George, is also a rider.

== World Final appearances ==
=== Individual Speedway World Championship ===
- 1971 – (Sweden) Gothenburg, Ullevi - 13th - 3pts
- 1976 – (Poland) Chorzów, Silesian Stadium - 10th - 6pts
- 1977 – (Sweden) Gothenburg, Ullevi - 14th - 3pts
- 1978 – (England) London, Wembley Stadium - 15th - 2pts
- 1980 – (Sweden) Gothenburg, Ullevi - 13th - 5pts
- 1981 – (England) London, Wembley Stadium - 16th - 3pts
- 1982 – (United States) Los Angeles Memorial Coliseum - 9th - 7pts
- 1983 – (Germany) Norden, Motodrom Halbemond - 16th - 1pt
- 1984 – (Sweden) Gothenburg, Ullevi - 15th - 1pt

=== Speedway World Pairs Championship ===
- 1970 – (Sweden) Malmö, Malmö Stadion (with Václav Verner) - 5th - 11pts (6)
- 1972 – (Sweden) Borås, Ryavallen (with Jan Holub I) - 6th - 12pts (7)
- 1973 – (Sweden) Borås, Ryavallen (with Petr Ondrašík) - 6th - 11pts (9)
- 1977 – (England) Manchester, Hyde Road (with Jan Verner) - 4th - 17pts (11)
- 1978 – (Poland) Chorzów, Silesian Stadium (with Jan Verner) - 4th - 18pts (9)
- 1982 – (Australia) Sydney, Liverpool City Raceway (with Aleš Dryml) - 7th - 8pts (5)
- 1984 – (Italy) Lonigo, Pista Speedway (with Aleš Dryml - 6th - 10pts (5)

=== Speedway World Team Cup ===
- 1970 – (England) London, Wembley Stadium] (with Zdeněk Majstr / Václav Verner / Miloslav Verner / Jan Holub) - 4th - 3pts (0)
- 1977 – (Poland) Wrocław, Olympic Stadium (with Václav Verner / Jan Verner / Aleš Dryml) - 3rd - 23pts (8)
- 1978 – (West Germany) Landshut, Ellermühle Stadium (with Václav Verner / Jan Verner / Aleš Dryml) - 4th - 16+2pts (7+2)
- 1979 – (England) London, White City Stadium (with Zdeněk Kudrna / Aleš Dryml / Václav Verner ) - 3rd - 19pts (6)
- 1980 – (Poland) Wrocław, Olympic Stadium (with Zdeněk Kudrna / Aleš Dryml / Václav Verner / Petr Ondrašík) - 4th - 12pts (4)
- 1982 – (England) London, White City Stadium (with Aleš Dryml / Václav Verner / Petr Ondrašík / Antonín Kasper Jr.) - 4th - 17pts (4)
- 1983 – (Denmark) Vojens, Speedway Center (with Aleš Dryml / Václav Verner / Antonín Kasper Jr. / Petr Ondrašík) - 4th - 3pts (2)

=== Individual Longtrack World Championship ===
- 1974 – (West Germany) Scheeßel - 11th - 9pts
- 1975 – (Socialist Federal Republic of Yugoslavia) Gornja Radgona - 11th - 9pts
- 1976 – (Czechoslovakia) Mariánské Lázně - 5th - 16pts
- 1977 – (Denmark) Aalborg - 4th - 15pts
- 1978 – (West Germany) Mühldorf - 9th - 11pts
- 1979 – (Czechoslovakia) Mariánské Lázně - 4th - 17pts
- 1980 – (West Germany) Scheeßel - 13th - 6pts
- 1981 – (Socialist Federal Republic of Yugoslavia) Gornja Radgona - 10th - 6pts
- 1982 – (Denmark) Esbjerg (Korskro) - 17th - 4pts
- 1983 – (Czechoslovakia) Mariánské Lázně - 2nd - 20pts
- 1984 – (West Germany) Herxheim bei Landau/Pfalz - 8th - 9pts
- 1985 – (Denmark) Esbjerg (Korskro) - 2nd - 19pts
