= 1977 Individual Ice Speedway World Championship =

Motorcycle ice speedway race

Seasons
- ← 1976 1978 →

The 1977 Individual Ice Speedway World Championship was the 12th edition of the World Championship The Championship was held on 5/6 March 1977 in Inzell, Germany.

The winner was Sergey Tarabanko of the Soviet Union for the third successive year.

== Final ==
- March 5–6
- FRG Inzell

Pos.	Rider	Points	Details
1	(Soviet Union) Sergey Tarabanko	27	
2	(Sweden) Conny Samuelsson	26	
3	(Czechoslovakia) Zdeněk Kudrna	24	
4	(Soviet Union) Aleksandr Scherbakov	23	
5	(Sweden) Kurt Westlund	21	
6	(Czechoslovakia) Jan Verner	16	
7	(Austria) Walter Wartbikhler	16	
8	(Netherlands) Roelof Thijs	15	
9	(West Germany) Hans Siegl	13	
10	(Soviet Union) Vladimir Subbotin	13	
11	(Sweden) Hans Johansson	11	
12	(Soviet Union) Nikolay Kostyunin	10	
13	(West Germany) Leonard Osvald	10	
14	(Soviet Union) Sergey Yarovoy	4	
15	(West Germany) Helmut Weber	4	
16	(Soviet Union) Vladimir Chapalo	2	
R1	(West Germany) Rainer Scherzel	2	
R2	(West Germany) Albert Stickl	0	

== See also ==
- 1977 Individual Speedway World Championship in classic speedway
