= Aleš Dryml =

Aleš Dryml may refer to:

- Aleš Dryml Sr. (born 1953), Czech speedway rider
- Aleš Dryml Jr. (born 1979), Czech speedway rider
