= 1978 Individual Ice Speedway World Championship =

Motorcycle ice speedway race

Seasons
- ← 1977 1979 →

The 1978 Individual Ice Speedway World Championship was the 13th edition of the World Championship The Championship was held on 4/5 March 1978 in Assen in the Netherlands.

The winner was Sergey Tarabanko of the Soviet Union for the fourth successive year.

== Classification ==
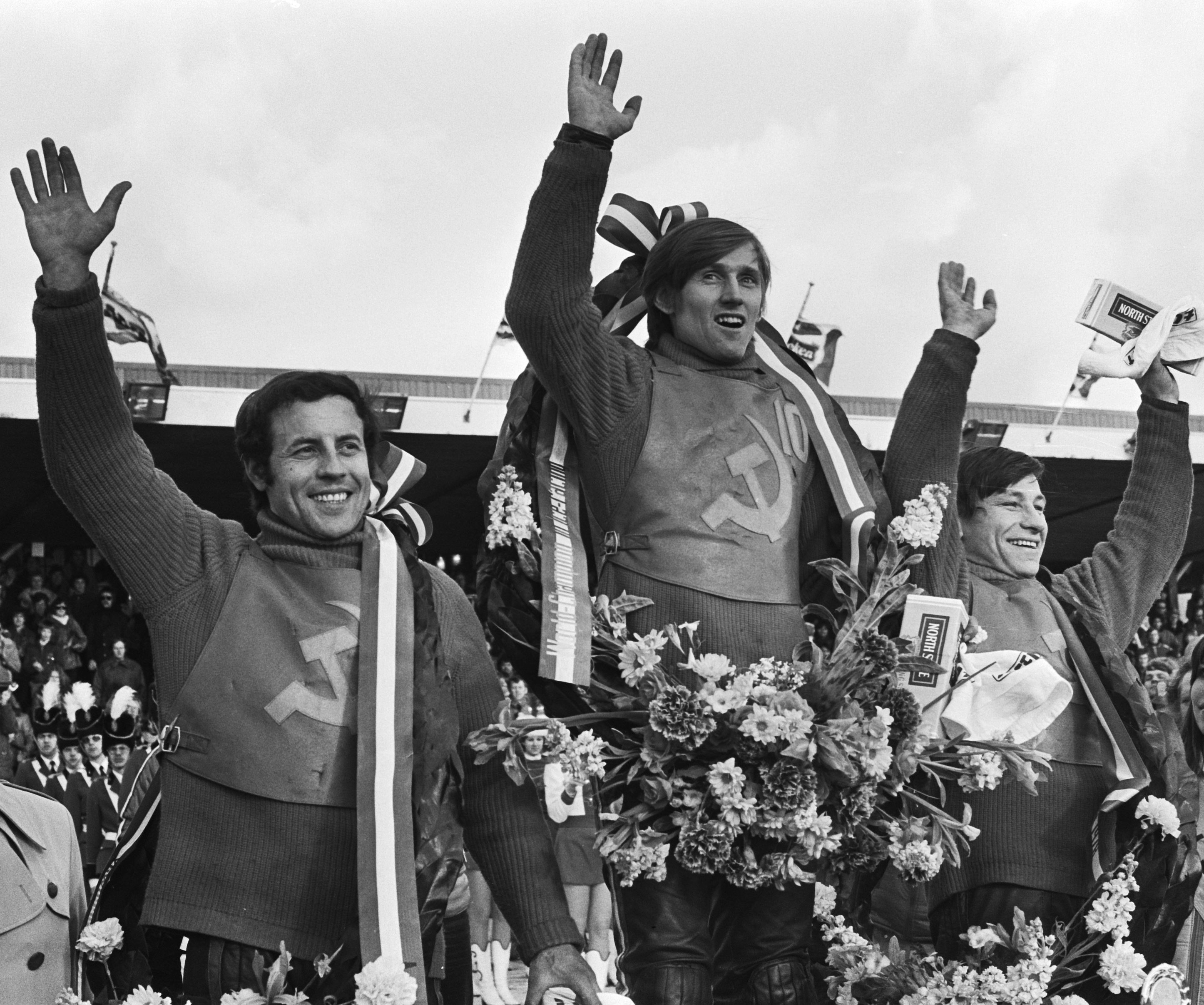
1978 medal winners Anatoly Gladychev, Sergei Tarabanko, Anatoly Bondarenko.

| Pos | Rider | Pts |
|---|---|---|
| 1 | (Soviet Union) Sergey Tarabanko | 28(15+13) |
| 2 | (Soviet Union) Anatoly Bondarenko | 24(14+10) |
| 3 | (Soviet Union) Anatoly Gladyshev | 23(13+10) |
| 4 | (Soviet Union) Vladimir Subbotin | 20(12+8) |
| 5 | (Sweden) Conny Samuelsson | 19(10+9) |
| 6 | (West Germany) Hans Siegl | 19(8+11) |
| 7 | (Soviet Union) Vladimir Serbin | 18(9+9) |
| 8 | (Soviet Union) Vladimir Lioubich | 18(8+10) |
| 9 | (West Germany) Leonard Oswald | 13(5+8) |
| 10 | (Austria) Walter Wartbichler | 11(2+9) |
| 11 | (Czechoslovakia) Zdeněk Kudrna | 10(4+6) |
| 12 | (Czechoslovakia) Jiri Jirout | 10(4+6) |
| 13 | (Sweden) Per-Olof Serenius | 9(6+3) |
| 14 | (Sweden) Hans Johnasson | 8(5+3) |
| 15 | (Sweden) Bo Kindgren | 5(2+3) |
| 16 | (Netherlands) Roelof Thijs | 2(-+2) |
| 17 | (Czechoslovakia) Milan Špinka (res) | 2(0+2) |
| 18 | (New Zealand) Bruce Cribb (res) | 0(0+0) |

== See also ==
- 1978 Individual Speedway World Championship in classic speedway
