= 1976 Individual Ice Speedway World Championship =

Motorcycle ice speedway race

Seasons
- ← 1975 1977 →

The 1976 Individual Ice Speedway World Championship was the 11th edition of the World Championship The Championship was held on 6/7 March 1976 in Assen in the Netherlands.

The winner was Sergey Tarabanko of the Soviet Union for the second successive year.

== Classification ==
Pos	Rider	Pts
1	(Soviet Union) Sergey Tarabanko	28(15+13)
2	(Czechoslovakia) Milan Špinka	27(13+14)
3	(Sweden) Conny Samuelsson	26(13+13)
4	(Soviet Union) Sergei Jarovoi	25(11+14)
5	(Sweden) Börje Sjöbom	19(10+9)
6	(Sweden) Kurt Westlund	19
7	(Czechoslovakia) Zdeněk Kudrna	18
8	(Soviet Union) Vladimir Tsibrov	14(8+6)
9	(Czechoslovakia) Jan Verner	12(6+6)
10	(Czechoslovakia) Aleš Dryml Sr.	10
11	(Czechoslovakia) Stanislav Kubíček	9
12	(Netherlands) Roelof Thijs	9
13	(Soviet Union) Vladimir Smirnov	8
14	(Soviet Union) Viktor Petrunin	5
15	(Netherlands) Hank Jager	4
16	(Sweden) Hans Johansson	3
17	(Germany) Rainer Scherzl	3(2+1)
18	(Soviet Union) Vyacheslav Dubinin	0

== See also ==
- 1976 Individual Speedway World Championship in classic speedway
