= 1973 Individual Ice Speedway World Championship =

World championship edition of Ice Speedway

Seasons
- ← 1972 1974 →

The 1973 Individual Ice Speedway World Championship was the eighth edition of the World Championship.

The winner was Gabdrakhman Kadyrov of the Soviet Union for the sixth time.

== Final ==
- March 10–11
- FRG Inzell

Pos.	Rider	Points	Details
1	(Soviet Union) Gabdrakhman Kadyrov	29	
2	(Soviet Union) Boris Samorodov	25	
3	(Soviet Union) Vladimir Paznikov	24	
4	(Sweden) Hans Johansson	23	
5	(Soviet Union) Vladimir Chapalo	21	
6	(Czechoslovakia) Milan Špinka	21	
7	(Soviet Union) Anatoly Sukhov	20	
8	(East Germany) Otto Barth	15	
9	(West Germany) Hans Siegl	14	
10	(Czechoslovakia) Antonín Šváb Sr.	13	
11	(Czechoslovakia) Jan Verner	11	
12	(Sweden) Per Lennart Eriksson	8	
13	(Sweden) Sven Sigurd	6	
14	(Sweden) Bo Kingren	4	
15	(West Germany) Christoph Betzl	3	
16	(Czechoslovakia) Václav Verner	3	
