= Sergey Tarabanko =

Russian ice speedway rider

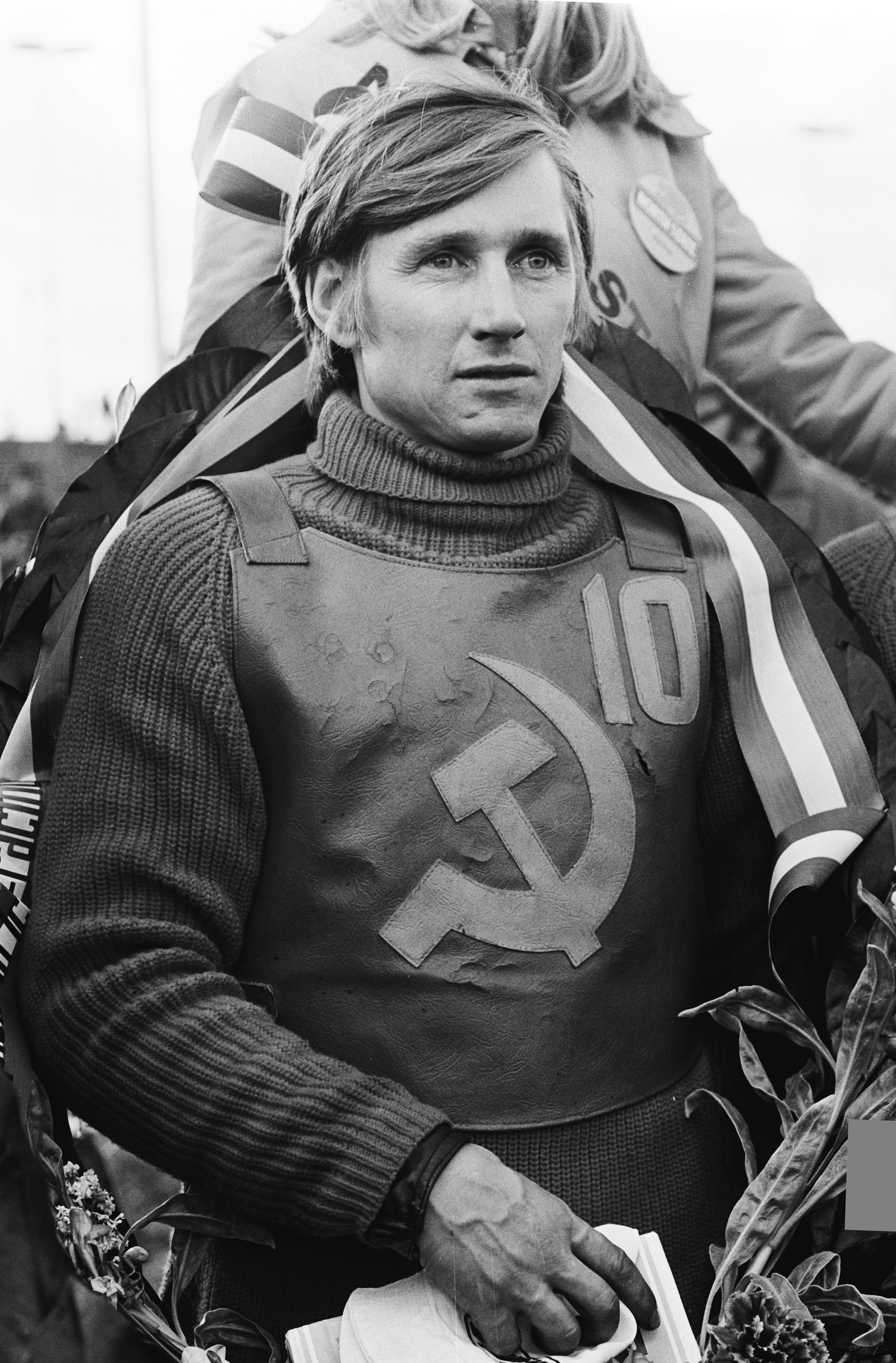
- Sergey Tarabanko at the 1978 World Championships

Personal information
- Full name: Sergey Aleksandrovich Tarabanko
- Born: 25 August 1949 (age 77) Moscow, Russia

Sport
- Sport: Ice speedway
Medal record
Representing the Soviet Union
World Ice Championships
Gold medal – first place	1975 Moscow	Individual
Gold medal – first place	1976 Assen	Individual
Gold medal – first place	1977 Inzell	Individual
Gold medal – first place	1978 Assen	Individual
Gold medal – first place	1979 Inzell	Team
Gold medal – first place	1980 Kalinin	Team
Silver medal – second place	1980 Kalinin	Individual
Gold medal – first place	1981 Assen	Team

Sergey Aleksandrovich Tarabanko (Russian: Сергей Александрович Тарабанько, born 25 August 1949) is a retired Russian ice speedway rider who won seven world titles between 1975 and 1981.

== Biography ==
Tarabanko was born in Moscow, but was soon moved to Kirovsk and then Angarsk, where he started training in cross-country motorcycle racing. After working as a turner at a factory, between 1968 and 1972 he served in the army.

Tarabanko won four consecutive World Ice Championships from 1975 to 1978.

In 1975, Tarabanko graduated from the University of Pedagogy in Chita. He then worked as a test driver for a Jawa Motors factory in Novosibirsk, and in 1977 moved to Moscow to coach motorcycle racers. He participated in the 1988 Winter Olympics as a driver of the Soviet Olympic team and later worked as the head of the CSKA racing team in Moscow.

== World Final appearances ==
=== Individual Ice Speedway World Championship ===
- 1974 - (Sweden) Nässjö - 4th - 10pts
- 1975 - (Soviet Union) Moscow - Winner - 30pts
- 1976 - (Netherlands) Assen - Winner
- 1977 - (West Germany) Inzell - Winner
- 1978 - (Netherlands) Assen - Winner
- 1980 - (Soviet Union) Kalinin - 2nd
