= 1975 Individual Ice Speedway World Championship =

World ice speedway event

Seasons
- ← 1974 1976 →

The 1975 Individual Ice Speedway World Championship was the tenth edition of the World Championship.

The winner was Sergey Tarabanko of the Soviet Union.

== Final ==
- 22–23 February
- (Soviet Union) Lenin Stadium, Moscow,

Pos.	Rider	Points	Details
1	(Soviet Union) Sergey Tarabanko	30	
2	(Soviet Union) Vladimir Tsybrov	27	
3	(Soviet Union) Sergey Kazakov	24	
4	(Soviet Union) Vyacheslav Dubinin	23	
5	(Soviet Union) Vladimir Smirnov	22	
6	(Soviet Union) Vladimir Chapalo	20	
7	(Netherlands) Roelof Thijs	17	
8	(Soviet Union) Valery Raspopin	15	
9	(Czechoslovakia) Zdeněk Kudrna	12	
10	(Soviet Union) Anatoly Sukhov	11	
11	(Sweden) Bo Kingren	10	
12	(Czechoslovakia) Milan Špinka	8	
13	(Czechoslovakia) Jan Verner	8	
14	(Czechoslovakia) Miroslav Verner	6	
15	(Czechoslovakia) Stanislav Kubíček	5	
16	(Sweden) Hahs Johansson	2	
R1	(Sweden) Karl-Evar Vattmann	0	
