= Pekka Hautamäki =

Finnish speedway rider

- Born: 9 June 1955 (age 71); Seinäjoki, Finland
- Nationality: Finnish

Career history

Great Britain
- 1978: Cradley Heathens
- 1979–1980: Belle Vue Aces

Sweden
- 1983: Brassarna
- 1984: Piraterna
- 1986: Gamarna

Individual honours
- 1981: Finnish Championship silver medal

Pekka Heikki Hautamäki (born 9 June 1955) is a Finnish former motorcycle speedway rider. He earned 7 caps for the Finland national speedway team.

== Career ==
Hautamäki made his British leagues debut in 1978, when he joined Cradley Heath for the 1978 British League season.

The following season, Hautamäki moved to ride for the Belle Vue Aces. Also in 1979, he represented the Finland national speedway team during the 1979 Speedway World Team Cup. His career at Belle Vue came to an end in early 1981, when he was offered as part of a transfer exchange with Sheffield Tigers.

Hautamäki established himself as a regular member of Finnish national squad and went on to compete in the next five Speedway World Cups, in 1980, 1981, 1982, 1983 and 1984.

Hautamäki also won the silver medal at the Finnish Individual Speedway Championship.
