= Petr Kučera =

Czech speedway rider

- Born: 12 May 1953 (age 73); Czechoslovakia
- Nationality: Czech

Career history

Czechoslovakia
- 19??: ČSAD Plzeň

Individual honours
- 1975: Czechoslovak Championship silver

Petr Kučera (born 12 May 1953) is a Czech former motorcycle speedway rider. He was capped by the Czechoslovak national speedway team.

== Career ==
Kučera competed in the individual championship of Czechoslovakia and won the silver medal in 1975.

Kučera represented the Czechoslovak national team during the Speedway World Team Cup in 1973, 1975, 1976, and 1982.

Like many Czech riders of the time, the Czechsolovak authorities rarely allowed riders to compete for British league teams but they did allow club sides such as Prague to tour the United Kingdom, which allowed Kučera to race in Britain in 1980.

Kučera reached the final of the Continental Speedway final as part of the 1981 Individual Speedway World Championship.

Kučera also rode grasstrack speedway and twice reached the final of the European Grasstrack Championship.
