= Zdeněk Kudrna =

Czech speedway rider (1946–1982)

- Born: 2 September 1946; Čisovice, Czechoslovakia
- Died: 1 June 1982 (aged 35)
- Nickname: Kermit
- Nationality: Czech

Career history

Czechoslovakia
- 1975–1982: Rudá Hvězda Praha

Great Britain
- 1979: Exeter Falcons
- 1980, 1982: Birmingham Brummies

Individual honours
- 1977, 1979: Ice World Championship bronze medal
- 6 times: Czechoslovak Ice racing champion
- 1979: Westernapolis

Zdeněk Kudrna (2 September 1946 – 1 June 1982) was a Czech speedway rider. He reached the Speedway World Championship final in 1979 and also finished third in the Individual Ice Racing World Championship twice, in 1977 and 1979. Kudrna was Czech Ice Racing champion six times, after the last of which he was awarded title Sportsman of the Year by the Czech Motorcycle Federation.

== Career ==
In 1974, Kudrna represented his country in a test series against England.

Kudrna was subject to several failed signing attempts with Cradley Heath Heathens and Bristol Bulldogs when he was due to race in Britain for the 1978 season. He eventually rode in the UK for the Exeter Falcons in 1979 with compatriots Aleš Dryml Sr., Jan Verner and Václav Verner. Also in 1979, he finished seventh Speedway World Championship final and was a member of the Czechoslovak team that finished third in the Speedway World Team Cup.

1980 saw Kudrna move to the Birmingham Brummies, where he was nicknamed Kermit due to his bright green leathers. The Czechoslovak authorities refused him permission to ride in the UK in 1981 but in 1982 he returned to the Brummies.

== World Final Appearances ==
=== Individual World Championship ===
- 1978 – (England) London, Wembley Stadium - Reserve - did not ride
- 1979 – (Poland) Chorzów, Silesian Stadium - 7th - 8pts

=== World Team Cup ===
- 1979 – (England) London, White City Stadium (with Jiří Štancl / Aleš Dryml Sr. / Václav Verner) - 3rd - 19pts (4)
- 1980 – (Poland) Wrocław, Olympic Stadium (with Jiří Štancl / Aleš Dryml Sr. / Václav Verner / Petr Ondrašík) - 4th - 12pt (1)

=== World Longtrack Championship ===
- 1976 – (Czechoslovakia) Mariánské Lázně 6th 14pts
- 1977 – (Denmark) Aalborg 12th 8pts
- 1978 – (West Germany) Mühldorf 15th 7pts
- 1979 – (Czechoslovakia) Mariánské Lázně 16th 2pts
- 1980 – (West Germany) Scheeßel 8th 9pts
- 1981 – (Socialist Federal Republic of Yugoslavia) Gornja Radgona 14th 4pts

=== Individual Ice Speedway World Championship ===
- 1974 – (Sweden) Nässjö 13th 4pts
- 1975 – (Soviet Union) Moscow 9th 12pts
- 1976 – (Netherlands) Assen 7th 18pts
- 1977 – (West Germany) Inzell 3rd 24pts
- 1978 – (Netherlands) Assen 11th 10pts
- 1979 – (West Germany) Inzell 3rd 26pts
- 1980 – (Soviet Union) Kalinin 4th 22pts
- 1981 - (Netherlands) Assen 4th 25pts
- 1982 - (West Germany) Inzell 4th

== Death ==
On 31 May 1982, Kudrna was racing in a grasstrack meeting in Stadskanaal, the Netherlands. He had already qualified to go through to the next round when midway through the final race, his throttle stuck open and he crashed full speed into the barrier. A wooden stake holding the fence impaled him. Despite being rushed to hospital, Kudrna died the next day from his injuries.

== See also ==
- Rider deaths in motorcycle speedway

== See also ==
- Czech Republic national speedway team
- Individual Ice Racing World Championship
