= Václav Verner =

Czech speedway racer (1949–2018)

- Born: 6 May 1949; Prague, Czechoslovakia
- Died: 13 March 2018 (aged 68); Prague, Czech Republic
- Nationality: Czech

Career history

Czechoslovakia
- 1970–1981: Rudá Hvězda Praha

Great Britain
- 1977–1979 & 1993–1995: Exeter Falcons
- 1980, 1982–1983: Poole Pirates
- 1996: Ryde Wight Wizards

Individual honours
- 1971: Czechoslovak champion
- 1980, 1982, 1984: Speedway World Championship finalist
- 1978: Yorkshire TV Trophy winner

Team honours
- 1978: Spring Gold Cup

Václav Verner (6 May 1949 – 13 March 2018) was a Czech speedway rider. He earned 42 international caps for the Czechoslovakia national speedway team.

== Speedway career ==
Verner was the individual champion of Czechoslovakia, after winning the Czechoslovak Championship in 1971, finished runner-up five time (1970, 1976, 1977, 1978, 1980) and third twice (1975, 1981).

In 1974, Verner represented his country in a test series against England.

Verner first rode in the top tier of British Speedway for Exeter Falcons in 1977.

Verner later rode for Poole Pirates and Exeter Falcons.

== World Final Appearances ==
=== Individual World Championship ===
- 1980 - (Sweden) Gothenburg, Ullevi - Reserve - did not ride
- 1982 - (United States) Los Angeles Memorial Coliseum - 15th - 2pts
- 1984 - (Sweden) Gothenburg, Ullevi - 16th - 0pts

=== World Pairs Championship ===
- 1970 - (Sweden) Malmö, Malmö Stadion (with Jiří Štancl) - 5th - 11pts (5)
- 1971 - (Poland) Rybnik, Rybnik Municipal Stadium (with Pavel Mareš) - 4th - 17pts (9)

=== World Team Cup ===
- 1970 - (England) London, Wembley Stadium (with Zdeněk Majstr / Jiří Štancl / Miloslav Verner / Jan Holub) - 4th - 3pts (3)
- 1977 - (Poland) Wrocław, Olympic Stadium (with Jiří Štancl / Jan Verner / Aleš Dryml) - 3rd - 23pts (5)
- 1978 - (West Germany) Landshut, Ellermühle Stadium (with Jiří Štancl / Jan Verner / Aleš Dryml Sr.) - 4th - 16+2pts (2)
- 1979 - (England) London, White City Stadium (with Zdeněk Kudrna / Aleš Dryml Sr. / Jiří Štancl) - 3rd - 19pts (4)
- 1980 - (Poland) Wrocław, Olympic Stadium (with Zdeněk Kudrna / Aleš Dryml Sr. / Jiří Štancl / Petr Ondrašík) - 4th - 12pts (3)
- 1982 - (England) London, White City Stadium (with Aleš Dryml Sr. / Jiří Štancl / Petr Ondrašík / Antonín Kasper Jr.) - 4th - 17pts (6)
- 1983 - (Denmark) Vojens, Speedway Center (with Aleš Dryml Sr. / Jiří Štancl / Antonín Kasper Jr. / Petr Ondrašík) - 4th - 3pts (1)

=== Individual Ice Speedway World Championship ===
- 1973 (West Germany) Inzell, 16th – 3pts
- 1984 (Soviet Union) Moscow, 15th

== Family ==
Verner's brother Jan and uncle Miloslav were also international speedway riders.

== Death ==
Verner died in 2018 after a long illness.
