= Michael Lee (speedway rider) =

British motorcycle speedway rider

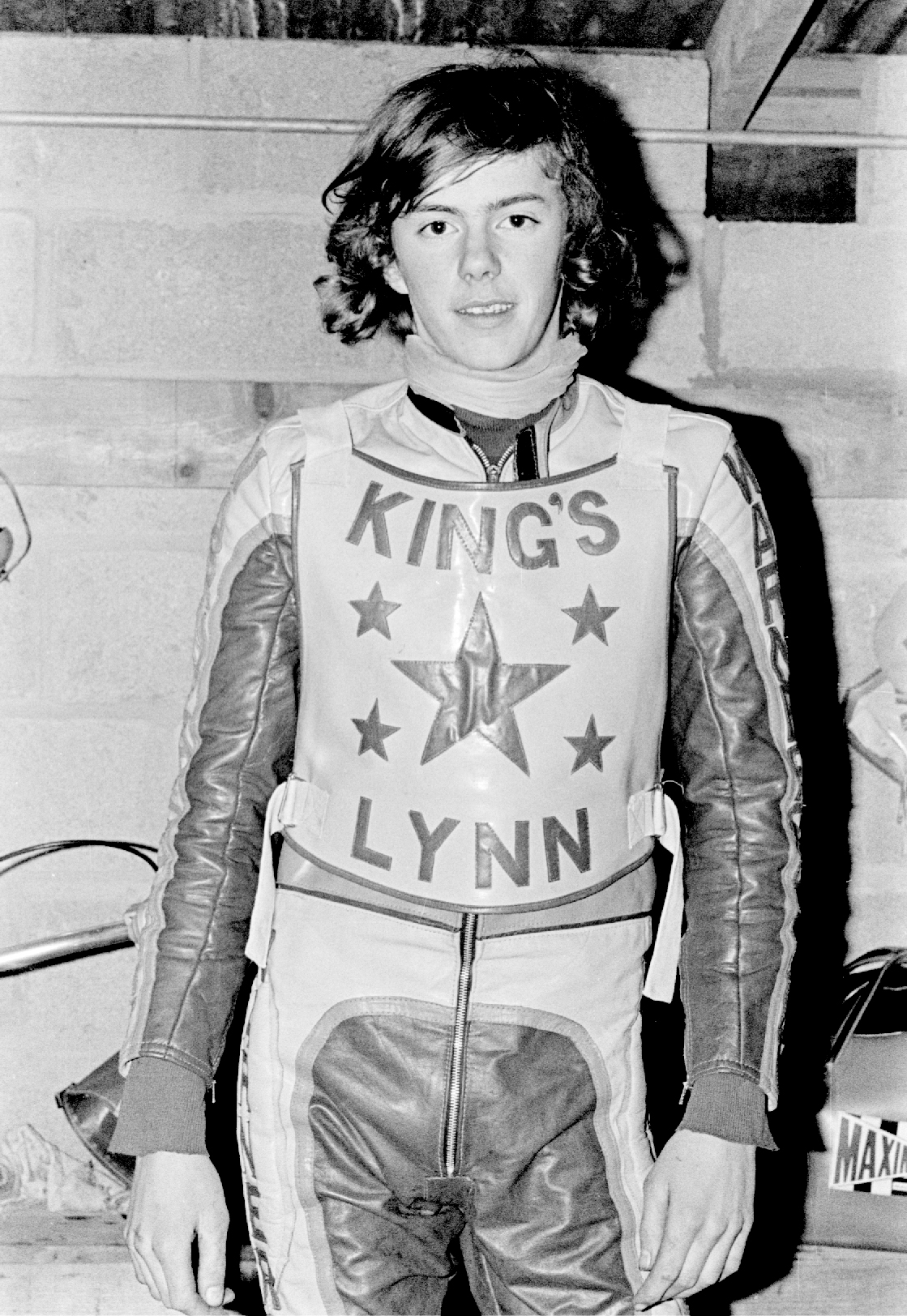
- Born: 11 December 1958 (age 67); Cambridge, England
- Nationality: British (English)

Career history
- 1975: Boston Barracudas
- 1975–1982, 1985–1986, 1991: King's Lynn Stars
- 1983–1984: Poole Pirates

Individual honours
- 1980: World Champion
- 1981: Long Track World Champion
- 1977, 1978: British Champion
- 1976: British Junior Champion
- 1979: Commonwealth Champion
- 1979: Intercontinental Champion
- 1977: Westernapolis
- 1979: Internationale
- 1980: Daily Mirror Grand Prix
- 1980: Silver Plume
- 1981, 1983: Pride of the East

Team honours
- 1977, 1980: World Team Cup Winner
- 1977: British League KO Cup Winner
- 1980: Gauntlet Gold Cup

Michael Andrew Lee (born 11 December 1958) is a British former international speedway rider who won the World Championship in 1980. He earned 72 international caps for the England national speedway team.

== Career ==
Born in Cambridge, England, Lee began his professional speedway career in 1975 with Boston Barracudas (on loan from parent club King's Lynn Stars) in the second division of speedway in the United Kingdom, the National League. In his first season, he recorded an impressive average points score of 9.13, he also rode part-time for his parent club King's Lynn.

In 1976, Lee moved full-time to British League team King's Lynn and finished the season with an average of 9.22, he was also the British Junior Champion that year.

At the end of the 1977 season, Lee had become the top scorer in the British League with an average of 10.64. He also won the first of his two British Speedway Championship titles. Lee won the World Team Cup with England and he had also made his first appearance in a World Championship Final.

In 1979, Lee finished third in the World Finals, beating Kelly Moran, Billy Sanders and Ole Olsen in a run-off race to claim the bronze medal. The next year, Lee won the World Championship in Gothenburg for the only time, finishing ahead of King's Lynn team mate Dave Jessup. He was also triumphant again with England in the World Team Cup. In 1981, he became the first British rider to win the World Long Track Championship, taking the title in Gornja Radgona ahead of Christoph Betzl and Anders Michanek. He continued to ride for King's Lynn until the end of the 1982 season.

Lee opted for a change in clubs in 1983 and moved to the Poole Pirates. He had another successful year, finishing with and average of 10.43. At the start of the 1984 season Lee was involved in an incident that would result in him being banned from speedway for a year. In a cup match against former club King's Lynn, Lee was excluded mid-race for a starting offence in heat 5 and returned to the pits in the wrong direction, allegedly causing the other riders to take evasive action. Despite the three other riders and the home promoter giving evidence that he had posed no danger, the Speedway Control Board fined him and banned him for five years, although this was later reduced on appeal. Many people at the time, including Lee himself, felt that the incident and the length of the ban had been used as a pretext to force him out of the sport.

In 1983, Lee appeared in his last World Final at the Motodrom Halbemond in Norden, West Germany. Installed as one of the pre-meeting favourites in what was described as the most open World Final for a number of years, Lee finished third on 11 points behind local favourite Egon Müller (15) and Australia's Billy Sanders (12). Lee also finished second as part of the English team at the 1983 World Team Cup Final in Vojens, Denmark.

After his ban ended, Lee returned to King's Lynn for two seasons, but he was given another fine after he didn't show up to a match in June 1986 and he seemingly quit the sport. Lee made his comeback to speedway on 16 February 1991, riding in the West End Speedway International at the Wayville Showground in Adelaide, South Australia where he finished fourth in the Final behind local rider Shane Bowes, Todd Wiltshire, and Swede Dennis Lofqvist. He then finished third behind Wiltshire and Troy Butler in the "Mr Melbourne" meeting at the Royal Melbourne Showgrounds, before heading back to England to take up a short-lived stint with King's Lynn.

== Personal life ==
Lee was convicted of growing cannabis for his own use in 2007 but avoided a jail term. He was subsequently fined for possession of cannabis and amphetamines in July 2013. On 8 October 2013, Lee was charged with rape and other sexual offences but was cleared of the charges at a trial in May 2014.

== World Final appearances ==
=== Individual World Championship ===
- 1977 - (Sweden) Gothenburg, Ullevi - 4th - 12pts + 2pts
- 1978 - (England) London, Wembley Stadium - 7th - 9pts
- 1979 - (Poland) Chorzów, Silesian Stadium - 3rd - 11pts +3pts
- 1980 - (Sweden) Gothenburg, Ullevi - Winner - 14pts
- 1981 - (England) London, Wembley Stadium - 10th - 5pts
- 1983 - (West Germany) Norden, Motodrom Halbemond - 3rd - 11pts

=== World Pairs Championship ===
- 1979 - (Denmark) Vojens, Speedway Center (with Malcolm Simmons) - 2nd - 24pts (15)

=== World Team Cup ===
- 1977 - (Poland) Wrocław, Olympic Stadium (with Peter Collins / Malcolm Simmons / Dave Jessup / John Davis) - Winner - 37pts (9)
- 1978 - (West Germany) Landshut, Ellermühle Stadium (with Malcolm Simmons / Dave Jessup / Peter Collins / Gordon Kennett) - 2nd - 27pts (5)
- 1980 - (Poland) Wrocław, Olympic Stadium (with Peter Collins / Dave Jessup / Chris Morton) - Winner - 40pts (11)
- 1983 - (Denmark) Vojens, Speedway Center (with Kenny Carter / Dave Jessup / Chris Morton / Peter Collins) - 2nd - 29pts (11)

== World Longtrack Championship ==
Finalist

- 1979 – (Czechoslovakia) Mariánské Lázně 9pts (9th)
- 1980 – (West Germany) Scheeßel 8pts (11th)
- 1981 – (Socialist Federal Republic of Yugoslavia) Gornja Radgona 23pts (Champion)
- 1983 – (Czechoslovakia) Mariánské Lázně 11pts (7th)

== Family ==
Michael Lee is the son of former well known British Scrambler Andy Lee.
