= Hansa Stadium =

Former stadium in Bremen, Germany

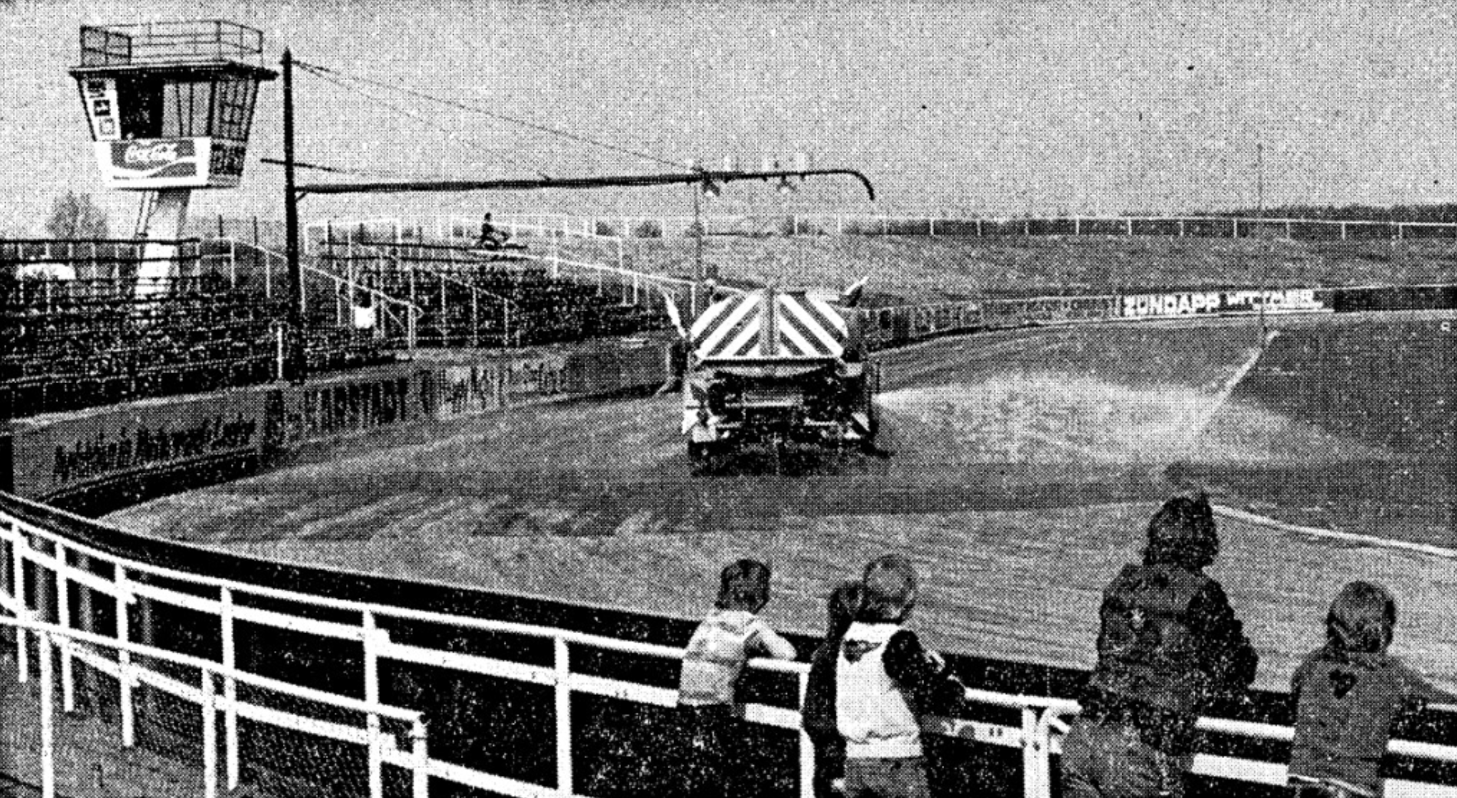
- The Hansa Stadium in 1978
- Location: Am Hansastadion, 28277 Bremen-Obervieland, Germany
- Coordinates: 53°02′42″N 8°49′39″E
- Capacity: 15,000
- Opened: 20 September 1953
- Length: 0.398 km (0.247 mi)

The Hansa Stadium was a multi-use stadium used primarily for motorcycle speedway, in the south of Bremen, Germany. It was located in the Kattenturm district of Bremen, off the Arsterdamm street. It was one of the largest sports venues in Bremen with up to 15,000 seats.

== History ==
In May 1952, the Motorsport Club (MSC) Hansa was founded and they leased the 28,000 square meter site of the former Potthast brickworks at Arsterdamm 70. Construction on a track began in December 1952, with club members filling the disused clay pit on the site with building rubble and war debris. The track was 398 meters long, ten meters wide on the straights and 15 meters wide on the curves, making it the only northern German sand track that met international regulations at the time of its opening. At times there was a football pitch for VfB Komet Bremen inside the speedway track.

The first race in the new Hansastadion was held on 20 September 1953, with 8,000 spectators. The stadium was a significant venue for major speedway events, including qualifying rounds of the Speedway World Championship in 1974, 1977 and 1985 and qualifying rounds of the Speedway World Team Cup in 1975 and 1980. Additionally, the semi-final of the 1983 Speedway World Pairs Championship was held at the stadium. From 1973, MSC Hansa took part in the then new Speedway Bundesliga.

A comprehensive renovation of the stadium took place in the spring of 1978; the capacity of the stands was increased to 15,000. The racetrack itself was renovated by a British specialist company. After the reopening, the Master of Speedway competition took place for the first time.

The decline of the MSC Hansa, and with it the Hansastadion, began in the early 1980s. Fuel and motorcycle prices rose sharply and race attendances dropped. In the wake of the emerging environmental movement, high-emission motorsport was also seen as a contributor to environmental problems and the requirements for holding noise-intensive events became increasingly stricter. MSC Hansa deregistered its team from the Bundesliga in the spring of 1983. In addition, after the death of the farmer Wilhelm Bredehöft, who had leased the stadium site to the club, a dispute arose over its continued use.

The property was put up for sale at 2.2 million German marks and several years later in March 1991, Bremer Gewerbebau GmbH offered the site to commercial users for purchase and the stadium was demolished.
