= Milan Špinka =

Czech speedway rider (1951–2024)

- Born: 5 May 1951; Pardubice, Czechoslovakia
- Died: 14 August 2024 (aged 73); Czech Republic
- Nationality: Czech

Career history

Czechoslovakia
- 1970–1983: Rudá Hvězda Praha

Great Britain
- 1979: Ipswich Witches
- 1979–1980, 1983: Swindon Robins

Individual honours
- 1974: Ice Speedway World Champion
- 1973: Golden Helmet of Pardubice

Milan Špinka (5 May 1951 – 14 August 2024) was a Czech speedway rider. He earned ten international caps for the Czechoslovakia national speedway team.

== Speedway career ==
Špinka won the gold medal at the Individual Ice Speedway World Championship in the 1974 Individual Ice Speedway World Championship. He also won a silver and bronze medal at the Championships.

In 1970, Špinka was selected for the Czechoslovakia junior team for their tour of Britain. In 1974, he represented his country in a test series against England.

Špinka rode in two world longtrack finals in 1973 and 1974.

Špinka rode in the top tier of British Speedway from 1979 to 1983, riding for Ipswich Witches and Swindon Robins.

== World final appearances ==
=== Individual Ice Speedway World Championship ===
- 1971 (West Germany) Inzell, 3rd – 21pts
- 1973 (West Germany) Inzell, 6th – 21pts
- 1974 (Sweden) Nässjö, champion – 15 pts
- 1975 (Soviet Union) Moscow, 12th – 8pts
- 1976 (Netherlands) Assen, 2nd – 27pts
- 1978 (Netherlands) Assen, 17th – 2pts
- 1980 (Soviet Union) Kalinin, 11th – 10pts
- 1981 (Netherlands) Assen, 14th – 6pts

=== World Longtrack Championship ===
- 1973 – (Norway) Oslo, 10th – 7pts
- 1974 - (West Germany) Scheeßel 14th - 4 pts

== Personal life and death ==
Špinka's father, Miloslav, was also an international speedway rider.

Špinka died on 14 August 2024, at the age of 73.
