= Vladimir Smirnov (speedway rider) =

Soviet speedway rider

- Born: 28 February 1946 (age 80); Soviet Union
- Nationality: Soviet Union /Russian

Team honours
- 1971: Speedway World Team Cup silver medal
- 1969: Speedway World Team Cup bronze medal

Vladimir Smirnov (born 28 February 1946) is a Russian former international speedway rider. He represented the Soviet Union.

== Speedway career ==
Smirnov won a bronze medal at the Speedway World Team Cup in the 1969 Speedway World Team Cup. Two years later, he won a silver medal in the 1971 Speedway World Team Cup and rode in the test series against England.

Smirnov was a leading ice rider and rode for Leningrad.

Smirnov later concentrated on ice speedway and reached two world finals in 1975 and 1976.

== World final appearances ==
=== World Team Cup ===
- 1969 - (Poland) Rybnik, Rybnik Municipal Stadium (with Gennady Kurilenko / Viktor Trofimov / Valeri Klementiev / Yury Dubinin) - 3rd - 23pts (9)
- 1971 - (Poland) Wrocław, Olympic Stadium (with Grigory Khlinovsky / Vladimir Gordeev / Viktor Trofimov / Anatoly Kuzmin) - 2nd - 22pts (7)

=== Ice World Championship ===
- 1975 – (Soviet Union) Moscow, 5th – 22pts
- 1976 – (Netherlands) Assen, 13th – 8pts
