= Sergey Yarovoy =

Kazakhstani serial killer and rapist (born 1963)

- Born: Sergey Alekseevich Yarovoy; 1963 (age 62–63); Kaskelen, Almaty Region, Kazakh SSR or Balkhash, Karaganda Region, Kazakh SSR
- Other names: "The Bloody Paramedic" "The Opytnoye Pole Chikatilo" "The Kazakh Chikatilo"
- Conviction: Murder x7
- Penalty: 4 years imprisonment (1990); 15 years imprisonment (1994); Life imprisonment (2011)

Details
- Victims: 7–8
- Span of crimes: 1994; 2006 – 2008
- Country: Kazakhstan, possibly Russia
- States: Almaty, East Kazakhstan; Novosibirsk (suspected)
- Date apprehended: For the last time on 24 July 2009
- Imprisoned at: Black Berkut Prison, Jitiqara, Kostanay Region

Sergey Alekseevich Yarovoy (Russian: Сергей Алексеевич Яровой; born 1963), known as The Bloody Paramedic (Russian: Кровавый фельдшер), is a Kazakhstani serial killer and rapist. Initially convicted of the rape-murder of a woman in 1994 and sentenced to 15 years imprisonment, he was paroled in 2004 and resumed killing two years later, murdering six children, teenage girls and women in Ust-Kamenogorsk and the village of Opytnoye Pole.

For the latter crimes, Yarovoy was convicted and sentenced to life imprisonment.

== Early life ==
Sergey Yarovoy was born in 1963, with different sources giving his birthplace either as Kaskelen or Balkhash. He was raised in a seemingly normal family, and after finishing the 8th grade, he moved to Almaty in the late 1970s and enrolled into medical school. In 1981, he was drafted into the Soviet Army, and after demobilization, he resumed his studies and graduated with the certification of a paramedic.

Soon after this, Yarovoy started working at a hospital in Almaty, where he was regarded positively by co-workers and his direct supervisors alike. He also married to a woman named Elena and had two children with her sometime in the mid-1980s.

By the end of the decade, however, Yarovoy's personality underwent a drastic shift and he developed an addiction to collecting and watching pornographic content. According to his wife's testimony, in 1989, he developed various sexual perversions and demanded that she engage in unconventional types of sex with him – his wife refused, subsequently divorced him and took the children with her.

== Murders ==
=== Initial crimes ===
Following the divorce, Yarovoy resigned from his workplace and started living on the streets. In 1990, he was found guilty of raping a woman in Boralday, for which he was sentenced to 3 years imprisonment. After serving it out in full, he returned to the town, and only a few months later, he raped and murdered a woman there.

Yarovoy was quickly arrested, tried and convicted for this, receiving a 15-year sentence. He was then transferred to serve it in a penal colony near Ust-Kamenogorsk, in East Kazakhstan.

=== Parole ===
After serving 10 years in prison, Yarovoy was paroled in 2004 and moved in with his elderly mother – who suffered from an unspecified mental illness. For the next five years, both he and his mother lived in a variety of places around Ust-Kamenogorsk, predominantly rented apartments, as well as a dacha in the village of Opytnoye Pole.

During this period, Yarovoy was officially jobless, making a living via stealing or doing casual labor. By the late 2000s, he became a member of a religious sect that supplied him with food and job opportunities – in exchange, he was required to periodically travel to Almaty and to Novosibirsk Oblast in neighboring Russia to proselytize to others.

=== Serial murders ===
Between August 2006 and 2008, Yarovoy committed a series of at least 9 rapes and 6 murders against children and women in Ust-Kamenogorsk and Opytnoye Pole. His modus operandi consisted of attacking victims in deserted areas such as vacant lots or near railroad tracks, sneaking up on them and hitting them on the back of the head with a blunt object such as a steel pipe. If the victim was knocked out successfully, he would then rape and sometimes beat them to death. He had no definitive victim type, as he killed both children, teenagers and women with age ranges from 8 to 50, with differing physical features and ethnicities. According to Yarovoy, they only thing that mattered was if there were no possible witnesses to an attack.

His first confirmed victim was a woman he attacked in August 2006 along a railway station that led to the village of Shmelev Log, just outside Ust-Kamenogorsk. After raping her, Yarovoy struck her multiple times with a metal bar in her vital organs, after which he disposed of the body in a nearby pit and covered it with branches and dirt.

Less than a year later, in June 2007, he lured away 8-year-old Irina Shertsobaeva from her family home's yard to an abandoned barn, on the premises of showing her some kittens. According to investigators, Yarovoy then raped the girl and subjected her to all kinds of physical abuse before strangling her to death – Yarovoy himself disputed this, claiming that he had no time to rape Shertsobaeva as she started screaming and threatening to call her father.

Over the next few days, Yarovoy committed at least four separate attacks, killing 16-year-old schoolgirl Ekaterina Zlydareva and raping three other women, who survived the assaults. One of these victims, Natalya Ushakova, managed to convince him that she was willing to be his girlfriend and that they would meet again tomorrow. Yarovoy seemingly believed her and let her go without harming her further, allowing her to escape.

A few months later, he came across a woman late at night who was in a hurry to catch a train on the "Zashchita" railway station. Yarovoy caught up with her and threw her to the ground, but the victim fiercely resisted him, causing them both to roll down an embankment. Once they reached the bottom, Yarovoy managed to put his hand over her mouth, get on top of her and hit her with a rock. He then raped the woman and subsequently killed her before fleeing the area.

In the summer of 2008, Yarovoy killed a 16-year-old teenage girl and a 30-year-old woman near Opytnoye Pole, both of which occurred within a short time frame of one another.

== Arrest and confessions ==
On 24 July 2009, Yarovoy was arrested on Seyfullina Street in Almaty while attempting to attack another girl. Shortly after his capture, he readily confessed to the investigators about the murders and expressed willingness to cooperate with them. For the following few months, Yarovoy was taken under escort to the crime scenes and demonstrated how he carried out the murders, as well as where he had buried the victims' remains.

In subsequent interrogations, Yarovoy stated that he only killed victims who resisted his rapes, leaving the compliant ones alive. He was additionally questioned about a similar rape-murder that occurred over the border in Novosibirsk, as a watchman of a local cooperative described seeing a man believed to be the killer that greatly resembled Sergey Yarovoy. While he never admitted involvement and was never charged in this case, Yarovoy claimed that he was indeed in the city at the time the crime was committed to do missionary work.

== Trial, sentence and imprisonment ==
Despite pointing out the crime scenes and recalling almost every detail about each murder, Yarovoy suddenly recanted his confession in the fall of 2009 and began to feign insanity. At his lawyer's request, he was ordered to undergo a psychiatric evaluation. While he was initially ruled sane, he was soon after interned at a mental institution after experiences symptoms of psychosis.

Yarovoy was again declared sane to stand trial in late 2010, after which he was charged by the court in Ust-Kamenogorsk. The trial began behind closed doors in January 2011, and during court hearings, Yarovoy insisted that he was being framed and that he was at the wrong place at the wrong time. Supposedly, the real killer was an Asian man wearing a medical mask and a black cap that was the true culprit, with Yarovoy claiming that the police falsely charged him and put him in prison, where he was beaten and raped by other inmates.

His claims were disregarded due to the amount of exhaustive evidence that indicated his guilt. As a result, on 4 April 2011, Sergey Yarovoy was found guilty on all counts and sentenced to life imprisonment. He was then transferred to serve out his sentence at the Black Berkut Prison in Jitiqara, where he remains to this day.

== See also ==
- List of serial killers by country
- List of serial rapists
