= Dave Jessup =

British motorcycle speedway rider

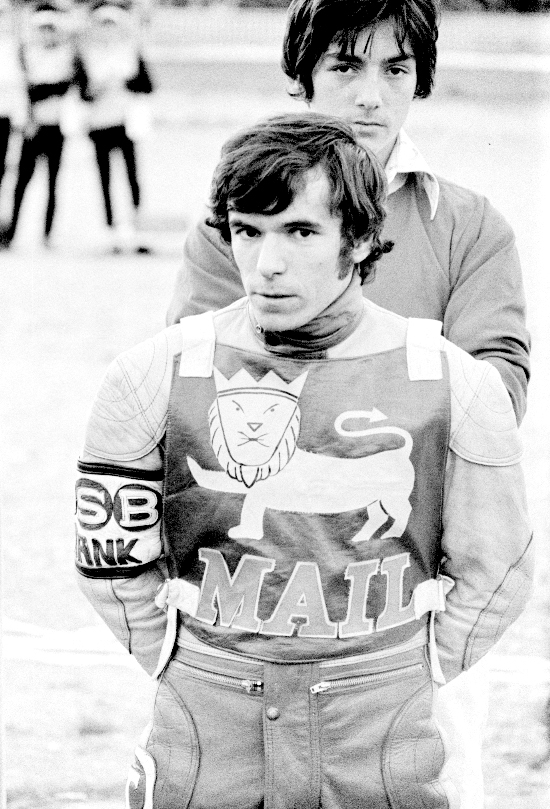
- Born: 7 March 1953 (age 73); Ipswich, England
- Nationality: British (English)

Career history
- 1969: Eastbourne Eagles
- 1970: West Ham Hammers
- 1970-1971: Wembley Lions
- 1972-1975: Leicester Lions
- 1976-1978: Reading Racers
- 1979-1981, 1984-1985: King's Lynn Stars
- 1982-1983: Wimbledon Dons
- 1986-1987: Mildenhall Fen Tigers

Individual honours
- 1980: British Champion
- 1980: Commonwealth Champion
- 1981, 1982: Overseas Champion
- 1970: British League Div 2 Riders Champion
- 1974: Midland Riders' Championship
- 1974: The Laurels
- 1974, 1980: Littlechild Trophy
- 1975, 1983: London Riders' Championship
- 1976: Yorkshire Television Trophy
- 1976, 1981: Spring Classic
- 1976, 1980: Superama
- 1979, 1980: Pride of the East
- 1979: Brandonapolis
- 1980: Blue Riband
- 1980: Internationale
- 1983, 1984: South African Champion

Team honours
- 1980: Speedway World Pairs Championship
- 1974, 1977, 1980: World Team Cup
- 1972, 1974: Midland Cup
- 1977: Spring Gold Cup
- 1980: Gauntlet Gold Cup
- 1987: National League Pairs Championship winner
- 1987: National League Fours Championship winner

David John Jessup (born 7 March 1953) is an English former motorcycle speedway rider. He was a world championship runner-up, world pairs champion, world cup winner and British champion. He earned 97 international caps for the England national speedway team.

== Career ==
Jessup commenced his speedway career in 1969, when he rode for Eastbourne Eagles recording 6.62 average during the 1969 British League Division Two season. The following season, he won the British League Division Two Riders Championship, held at Hackney Wick Stadium on 25 September 1970. Jessup was aged just 17 at the time. He also rode for Wembley Lions in the British League.

In 1972, Jessup joined Leicester Lions and spent four years with the Midlands club. In 1974, he won the first of three World Team Cups with the England national speedway team and in 1975, he won the London Riders' Championship in 1975, despite being in his fourth and final season with Leicester. He recorded an average of 10.45 in his last season with Leicester.

In 1976, Jessup joined Reading Racers and was their top rider for three seasons. In 1977, he helped England win the World Cup to earn a second winners medal. In 1977 and 1978, Jessup finished second in the British Speedway Championship to Michael Lee and the following year finished third behind Peter Collins and Michael Lee.

In 1979, Jessup switched to King's Lynn Stars after rejecting a new deal with Reading and joined up with Michael Lee as a teammate. The transfer to King's Lynn set a new British transfer record of £20,000 at the time.

In 1980, Jessup completed his best ever season. He finished runner-up in the Speedway World Championship to fellow countryman Michael Lee. The same season, he won the World Pairs Championship with Peter Collins, the World Cup with England and became British Speedway champion.

Jessup continued to perform at the highest level in 1981 and moved to join Wimbledon Dons for the 1982 British League season, where he topped the London team's averages for both 1982 and 1983. He returned to King's Lynn for the 1984 British League season but struggled to retain the form he had for the previous decade.

In 1986, Jesup dropped a division to join the Mildenhall Fen Tigers after leaving the Stars. The following year in 1987, he won the National League Pairs, partnering Melvyn Taylor for Mildenhall, during the 1987 National League season. He also helped Mildenhall win the Fours Championship during the 1987 season.

When Jessup retired in 1988, he had earned a remarkable 97 England caps and had reached six world finals.

== World final appearances ==
=== Individual World Championship ===
- 1974 – (Sweden) Gothenburg, Ullevi - 13th - 5pts
- 1978 – (England) London, Wembley Stadium - 4th - 11pts + 2pts
- 1979 – (Poland) Chorzów, Silesian Stadium - 8th - 8pts
- 1980 – (Sweden) Gothenburg, Ullevi - 2nd - 12pts + 3pts
- 1981 – (England) London, Wembley Stadium - 8th - 7pts
- 1982 – (United States) Los Angeles, Memorial Coliseum - 6th - 8pts

=== World Pairs Championship ===
- 1974 – (England) Manchester, Hyde Road (with Peter Collins) - 4th - 20pts (8)
- 1980 – (Socialist Federal Republic of Yugoslavia) Krško, Matija Gubec Stadium (with Peter Collins) - Winner - 29pts (15)
- 1981 – (Poland) Chorzów, Silesian Stadium (with Chris Morton) - 6th - 17pts (7)

=== World Team Cup ===
- 1974 – (Poland) Chorzów, Silesian Stadium (with Peter Collins / John Louis / Malcolm Simmons) - Winner - 42pts (10)
- 1977 – (Poland) Wrocław, Olympic Stadium (with Peter Collins / Michael Lee / John Davis / Malcolm Simmons) - Winner - 37pts (9)
- 1978 – (West Germany) Landshut, Stadion Ellermühle (with Malcolm Simmons / Peter Collins / Gordon Kennett / Michael Lee) - 2nd - 27pts (5)
- 1980 – (Poland) Wrocław, Olympic Stadium (with Peter Collins / Chris Morton / Michael Lee) - Winner - 40pts (8)
- 1981 – (West Germany) Olching, Olching Speedwaybahn (with Chris Morton / Kenny Carter / John Davis / Gordon Kennett) - 2nd - 29pts (3)
- 1983 – (Denmark) Vojens, Speedway Center (with Kenny Carter / Michael Lee / Chris Morton / Peter Collins) - 2nd 29pts (2)
