= Conny Samuelsson =

Swedish speedway rider

- Born: 15 August 1947 (age 79); Rumskulla, Sweden
- Nationality: Swedish

Career history
- 1964-1999: Njudungarna / Vetlanda
- 1969: Oxford Cheetahs

Individual honours
- 1977: Ice Speedway World Championship silver medal
- 1976: Ice Speedway World Championship bronze medal

Team honours
- 1986, 1987: Elitserien Champion
- 1976: Allsvenskan Champion
- 1966, 1975: Allsvenskan Div 2 Champion

Erik Tage Conny Samuelsson (born 15 August 1947) is a former international motorcycle speedway rider from Sweden. He earned 9 caps for the Sweden national speedway team.

== Speedway career ==
Samuelsson won the silver medal at the Individual Ice Speedway World Championship in the 1977 Individual Ice Speedway World Championship. He had won a bronze medal the previous year in the 1976 Individual Ice Speedway World Championship.

Samuelsson rode in the top tier of British Speedway in 1969 riding for Oxford Cheetahs. It was the only club outside of the Njudungarna team that he ever rode for, although he was allocated to Sheffield Tigers in 1971 but the deal did not materialise. He spent 35 years riding for Njudungarna.

== World final appearances ==
=== Ice World Championship ===
- 1969 – (West Germany) Inzell, 13th – 7pts
- 1970 – (Sweden) Nässjö, 4th – 14pts
- 1971 – (West Germany) Inzell, 9th – 16pts
- 1972 – (Sweden) Nässjö, 13th – 5pts
- 1976 – (Netherlands) Assen, 3rd – 26pts
- 1977 – (West Germany) Inzell, 2nd – 26pts
- 1978 – (Netherlands) Assen, 5th – 19pts
- 1979 – (West Germany) Inzell, 13th – 5pts
