= Jan Verner =

Czech motorcycle speedway racer

- Born: 3 March 1951 (age 75); Mladá Boleslav, Czechoslovakia
- Nationality: Czech

Career history

Czechoslovakia
- 1972–1985: Rudá Hvězda Praha

Great Britain
- 1978, 1979: Exeter Falcons
- 1980, 1982: Swindon Robins
- 1982: Cradley Heathens

Individual honours
- 1977: World Championship finalist
- 1977: Continental Final Champion

Team honours
- 1982: British League Cup
- 1978: Spring Gold Cup

Jan Verner (born 3 March 1951) is a Czech former speedway rider. He earned nine international caps for the Czechoslovakia national speedway team.

== Speedway career ==
Verner reached the final of the Speedway World Championship in the 1977 Individual Speedway World Championship.

In 1974, Verner represented his country in a test series against England. In 1980, he was part of the Prague team that toured the United Kingdom.

Verner rode in the top tier of British Speedway from 1978–1982, riding for various clubs.

== World final appearances ==
=== Individual World Championship ===
- 1977 – (Sweden) Gothenburg, Ullevi – 15th – 1pt
- 1978 – (England) London, Wembley Stadium – 12th – 5pts

=== World Pairs Championship ===
- 1977 – (England) Manchester, Hyde Road (with Jiří Štancl) – 4th – 17pts (6)
- 1978 – (Poland) Chorzów, Silesian Stadium (with Jiří Štancl) – 4th – 18pts
- 1981 – (Poland) Chorzów, Silesian Stadium (with Aleš Dryml Sr.) – 4th – 18pts

=== World Team Cup ===
- 1977 – (Poland) Wrocław, Olympic Stadium (with Jiří Štancl / Václav Verner / Aleš Dryml) – 3rd – 23pts (5)
- 1978 – (West Germany) Landshut, Ellermühle Stadium (with Jiří Štancl / Václav Verner / Aleš Dryml) – 4th – 16+2pts (5)

=== World Longtrack Championship ===
- 1976 – (Czechoslovakia) Mariánské Lázně 19th 0pts
- 1977 – (Denmark) Aalborg 14th 4pts
- 1978 – (West Germany) Mühldorf 13th 9pts

=== Individual Ice Speedway World Championship ===
- 1972 – (Sweden) Nässjö 14th 4pts
- 1973 – (West Germany) Inzell 11th 11pts
- 1975 – (Soviet Union) Moscow 13th 8pts
- 1976 – (Netherlands) Assen 9th 12pts
- 1977 – (West Germany) Inzell 6th 16pts
- 1985 – (Netherlands) Assen, 9th

== Family ==
Verner's brother Václav and his uncle Miloslav were also international speedway riders.
