= Rolf Gramstad =

Norwegian speedway rider

- Born: 5 January 1957 (age 69); Sandnes, Norway
- Nationality: Norwegian

Career history
- 1978–1979: Swindon Robins
- 1980–1981: Leicester Lions

Individual honours
- 1981: Nordic Long Track Champion

Rolf Gramstad (born 5 January 1957) is a former motorcycle speedway rider from Norway. He earned five caps for the Norway national speedway team.

== Biography ==
Gramstad was born in Sandnes, Norway in 1957. He rode for Vienna in 1977, gaining his first cap for Norway later that year and was taken on trial by Birmingham Brummies. He first raced in the British League with Swindon Robins in 1978, and after two season moved to Leicester Lions for a transfer fee of £6,500. From a starting point of reserve he became a heat leader by the end of his first season, averaging over 7.4. In 1981, he won the Nordic Long Track Championship.

Gramstad's career was ended on 6 September 1981 by a freak accident while competing in grasstrack at Berghaupten, in West Germany, which left him paralysed. Czech rider Zdenek Kudrna, making a practice start, smashed violently into the rear of Gramstad, who had stopped on the inside of the back straight after completing a practice race. Gramstad was preparing for a practice start before returning to the pits. Having damaged three vertebrae in the collision with Kudrna, Gramstad was taken for surgery to a hospital at Strasbourg, France. He later received further treatment at a hospital in Sheffield, England. By the end of the year, Gramstad was able to walk with crutches, and within two years of the accident walked unaided down the aisle at his wedding. However, he was unable to race again.
