= Aleš Dryml Sr. =

Czech speedway rider (born 1953)

- Born: 10 June 1953 (age 73); Kolín, Czechoslovakia
- Nationality: Czech

Career history

Czechoslovakia
- 1979, 1981, 1991: Zlatá Přilba Pardubice
- 1983-1985: SVS Pardubice

Great Britain
- 1978, 1979: Exeter Falcons
- 1980: Sheffield Tigers
- 1982: Birmingham Brummies

Individual honours
- 1989, 1991: Long Track World Championship silver medal
- 1982, 1993, 1994, 1995: Czech Longtrack Championship

Aleš Dryml Sr. (born 10 June 1953) is a Czech former motorcycle speedway rider who competed in speedway, longtrack and grasstrack racing. He earned 32 international caps for the Czechoslovakia national speedway team.

== Career ==
Dryml reached fourteen World Longtrack world championship finals, finishing second in 1989 and 1991.

Dryml rode in the top tier of British Speedway from 1978 to 1982, riding for Exeter Falcons, Sheffield Tigers and Birmingham Brummies.

== Family ==
Dryml has two sons Aleš and Lukáš who both also compete in Speedway.

== World Final appearances ==
=== Individual World Championship ===
- 1980 - (Sweden) Gothenburg, Ullevi - 12th - 5pts
- 1981 - (England) London, Wembley Stadium - 14th - 3pts

=== World Pairs Championship ===
- 1981 - (Poland) Chorzów, Silesian Stadium (with Jan Verner) - 4th - 18pts (12)
- 1982 - (Australia) Sydney, Liverpool City Raceway (with Jiří Štancl) - 7th - 8pts (3)
- 1984 - (Italy) Lonigo, Santa Marina Stadium (with Jiří Štancl) - 6th - 10pts (5)

=== World Team Cup ===
- 1977 - (Poland) Wrocław, Olympic Stadium (with Václav Verner / Jan Verner / Jiří Štancl) - 3rd - 23pts (5)
- 1978 - (West Germany) Landshut, Ellermühle Stadium (with Jiří Štancl / Václav Verner / Jan Verner) - 4th - 16+2pts (2)
- 1979 - (England) London, White City Stadium (with Zdeněk Kudrna / Jiří Štancl / Václav Verner) - 3rd - 19pts (5)
- 1980 - (Poland) Wrocław, Olympic Stadium (with Zdeněk Kudrna / Jiří Štancl / Václav Verner / Petr Ondrašík) - 4th - 12pts (1)
- 1982 - (England) London, White City Stadium (with Jiří Štancl / Václav Verner / Petr Ondrašík / Antonín Kasper Jr.) - 4th - 17pts (7)
- 1983 - (Denmark) Vojens, Speedway Center (with Jiří Štancl / Václav Verner / Antonín Kasper Jr. / Petr Ondrašík) - 4th - 3pts (0)

=== Ice World Championship ===
- 1974 – (Sweden) Nässjö, 16th
- 1976 – (Netherlands) Assen, 10th

== Czechoslovak Individual Speedway Champion ==
- 1974 (Czech Republic) (18th) 6.5pts
- 1975 (Czech Republic) (8th) 32pts
- 1976 (Czech Republic) (17th) 9pts
- 1977 (Czech Republic) (4th) 67pts
- 1978 (Czech Republic) (5th) 60pts
- 1979 (Czech Republic) (4th) 61pts
- 1980 (Czech Republic) (4th) 67pts
- 1981 (Czech Republic) (Second) 55pts (after run-off)
- 1982 (Czech Republic) (Champion) 51pts
- 1983 (Czech Republic) (Third) 47pts
- 1984 (Czech Republic) (Champion) 75pts
- 1985 (Czech Republic) (Second) 66pt

== World Longtrack Championship ==
Finals

- 1977 (Denmark) Aalborg (8th) 12pts
- 1978 (Germany) Mühldorf (10th) 10pts
- 1979 (Czech Republic) Mariánské Lázně (11th) 8pts
- 1983 (Czech Republic) Mariánské Lázně (6th) 14pts
- 1984 (Germany) Herxheim (7th) 10pts
- 1985 (Denmark) Esbjerg (14th) 4pts
- 1989 (Czech Republic) Mariánské Lázně (Second) 37pts
- 1990 (Germany) Herxheim (12th) 10pts
- 1991 (Czech Republic) Mariánské Lázně (Second) 21pts
- 1992 (Germany) Pfarrkirchen (6th) 13pts
- 1993 (Germany) Mühldorf (6th) 13pts
- 1994 (Czech Republic) Mariánské Lázně (5th) 16pts
- 1995 (Germany) Scheeßel (8th) 17pts
- 1996 (Germany) Herxheim (15th) 4pts

Semi-finals

- 1980 (Socialist Federal Republic of Yugoslavia) Gornja Radgona (11th) 7pts
- 1982 (Germany) Jubeck (16th) 3pts

Qualifying round

- 1981 (Germany) Harsewinkel (12th) 6pts
