= Ellermühle Speedway Stadium =

Stadium in Landshut, Germany

- Location: Flugplatzstrasse 10, D-84034 Landshut, Germany
- Coordinates: 48°30′45″N 12°02′37″E
- Capacity: 12,000
- Opened: 17 August 1975
- Length: 0.39 km (0.24 mi)

The Ellermühle Speedway Stadium also known as the OneSolar Arena is a 12,000-capacity motorcycle speedway stadium and driving safety facility, 10 km west of Landshut in Germany. The site is directly next to Flugplatz Landshut (Landshut Airport), which should not be confused as Munich airport.

== Speedway ==
The stadium is owned by the Landshut Automobile Club. It is the home venue of the speedway team called AC Landshut or the Landshut Devils who race in the Team Speedway Polish Championship.

The Mayor Josef Deimer and ADAC President Franz Stadler opened the stadium on 17 August 1975. The stadium has hosted various international events including the 1978 Speedway World Team Cup and the German Grand Prix during the 1997 Speedway Grand Prix season.

In 2012, the name OneSolar Arena was used due to a new sponsor OneSolar International. The associated buildings of the stadium have a definitive look because of the use of solar panels.

On 28 July 2018, the 390 metre track record was broken by Martin Smolinski, who recorded 66.1 sec.

In 2024, the venue hosted a round of the 2024 Speedway Grand Prix (the World Championship). It was be the first time since 1997 that a Grand Prix round has been held at the track.

== Driver safety ==
The stadium is also used as an ADAC training facility and the Landshut Traffic Watch also uses the site for this purpose.
