= 1977 Individual Speedway World Championship =

Motorcycle speedway world championship season

Seasons
- ← 1976 1978 →

The 1977 Individual Speedway World Championship was the 32nd edition of the official World Championship to determine the world champion rider.

History was made in the 1977 final when Ivan Mauger of New Zealand equalled Ove Fundin's title record of five World Championship wins. Mauger had gone close to equalling the record before and finally achieved it in Sweden, the home of Fundin. In a decisive 18th heat re-run Mauger won from his nearest challenger Ole Olsen (the latter riding on his spare bike saw his title hopes end). In the original start Olsen was leading Mauger when he was forced to lay his bike down to avoid hitting John Boulger and damaged his jawa bike. Defending champion Peter Collins won his last ride to claim the silver medal despite riding with a broken left leg, but Olsen won the bronze medal run-off against young English rider Michael Lee.

Qualifying results.

== First round ==
=== British Preliminary round ===
- Riders progress to British quarter-finals

Date	Venue	Winner	2nd	3rd
21 April	Oxford Stadium, Oxford	Paul Tyrer	Geoff Bouchard	Martin Yeates
30 April	Loomer Road, Newcastle-under-Lyme	Robbie Gardner	John Jackson	Carl Glover
1 May	Rye House Stadium, Hoddesdon	Karl Fiala	Les Collins	Mike Lanham
5 May	Somerton Park, Newport	Steve Weatherley	Barney Kennett	Steve Lomas

=== New Zealand qualification ===
Date	Venue	Winner	2nd	3rd
North Island Final
12 January	Western Springs Stadium, Auckland	John Goodall	Mike Fullerton	Jack Millen
South Island Final
3 January	Ruapuna Speedway, Templeton	Roger Wright	Larry Ross	Paul Fewings

== Second round ==
=== New Zealand semi-final ===
Date	Venue	Winner	2nd	3rd
20 January	Ruapuna Speedway, Templeton	Ivan Mauger	Larry Ross	Barry Briggs

=== Australian qualification ===
Date	Venue	Winner	2nd	3rd
New South Wales Round
27 November	Sydney Showground, Sydney	Ricky Day	Billy Sanders	Mitch Shirra
Queensland qualification
28 November	Carina Speedway, Bundaberg	John Titman	Neil Coddington	Owen Hall
Victorian qualification
8 January	Northern Park Raceway, Melbourne	Phil Crump	Danny Kennedy	Rob Jones
Southern qualification
17 January	Rowley Park, Adelaide	John Boulger	Tony Boyle	Bob Maxfield
28 January	Rowley Park, Adelaide	Phil Crump	John Boulger	Tony Boyle
New South Wales qualification
11 February	Jerilderie Park, Tomago	Phil Crump	Phil Herne	Billy Sanders
West Australian qualification
21 February	Claremont Speedway, Perth	Glyn Taylor	Neil Webb	Les Leisk
Northern Zone Final
23 February	Exhibition Ground, Brisbane	Neil Coddington	Steve Koppe	Mike Farrell

=== Continental Preliminary round ===
- Riders progress to Continental semi-finals.

Josef Angermüller was killed during the first preliminary round at the San Savino Speedway Park after falling and colliding with a concrete post.

Date	Venue	Winner	2nd	3rd
24 April	(Italy) San Savino, Civitanova Marche	(Italy) Paolo Noro	(Czechoslovakia) Jan Hadek	(Czechoslovakia) Jiří Štancl
25 April	(West Germany) Breitwangbahn, Bopfingen	(East Germany) Georg Hack	(Czechoslovakia) Jiri Jirout	(East Germany) Hans Ziegl

=== British quarter-finals ===
- Top 32 progress to British semi-finals

Date	Venue	Winner	2nd	3rd
14 May	The Shay, Halifax	Chris Pusey	Doug Wyer	John Louis
16 May	Dudley Wood Stadium, Dudley	Gordon Kennett	George Hunter	Bob Kilby
18 May	King's Lynn Stadium, King's Lynn	Michael Lee	Paul Tyrer	Chris Morton
20 May	Hackney Wick Stadium, London	Malcolm Simmons	Martin Yeates	Dave Jessup

== Third round ==
=== British semi-finals ===
- 27 June
- (England) Birchfield Ladbroke Stadium, Birmingham
- Top 8 to British final

Pos.	Rider	Points
1	Terry Betts	13
2	Michael Lee	11
3	Alan Wilkinson	10+3
4	Martin Ashby	10+2
5	Neil Middleditch	10+1
6	Barry Thomas	9
7	Gordon Kennett	9
8	David Gagen	9
9	Bobby Beaton	8
10	Trevor Geer	8
11	Chris Pusey	8
12	Ray Wilson	7
13	Bobby McNeil	4
14	Graham Drury	3
15	Steve Finch	1
16	Paul Tyrer	0

- 29 June
- (England) Wimborne Road, Poole
- Top 8 to British final

Pos.	Rider	Points
1	Dave Jessup	15
2	Doug Wyer	14
3	Malcolm Simmons	13
4	John Davis	12
5	Bob Kilby	10
6	Keith White	9
7	Chris Morton	9
8	John Louis	8
9	Martin Yeates	7
10	Ian Turner	6
11	Reg Wilson	5
12	Jim McMillan	4
13	Dave Gooderham	4
14	Bernie Leigh	3
15	George Hunter	1
16	John Jackson	0

=== New Zealand Final ===
- 12 February 1977
- (New Zealand) Western Springs Stadium, Auckland
- First 8 to Australasian final

Pos.	Rider	Heat Scores	Total
1	Larry Ross	3,2,3,3,3	14
2	Ivan Mauger	X,3,3,3,3	12
3	Robin Adlington	2,3,2,2,3	12
4	Barry Briggs	1,1,3,3,3	11
5	John Goodall	3,3,1,3,1	11
6	Roger Wright	1,3,2,2,2	10
7	Colin Farquharson	2,2,3,2,1	10
8	Mike Fullerton	3,1,2,1,2	9
9	Colin Tucker	3,0,1,2,2	8
10	Paul Fewings	2,1,0,1,1	5
11	Max Brown	1,0,2,0,1	4
12	Allan Brown	0,2,1,1,F	4
13	James Moore	0,F,X,1,2	3
14	Malcolm Chambers	2,F,0,-,-	2
15	Bruce Spargo	0,1,0,0,0	1
16	John Bargh	0,-,0,0,0	0
R1	Merv Hodgson	1,1,0	2
R2	Bruce Mitchell	2,0	2

=== Australian Final ===
- 25 February 1977
- (Australia) Jerilderie Park Speedway, Tomago
- First 8 to Australasian final

Pos.	Rider	Total
1	Phil Crump	15
2	Phil Herne	13
3	Billy Sanders	13
4	John Boulger	11
5	Mike Farrell	10
6	John Titman	9
7	Ricky Day	9
8	Mitch Shirra	8
9	Stuart Mountford	7
10	Danny Kennedy	7
11	Tony Boyle	7
12	Paul O'Neil	4
13	Robin Amundson	3
14	Mick McKeon	2
15	John Williams	2
16	Robert Maxfield	0

=== Finland Final ===
- 29 August '76
- (Finland) Turku Hippodrome, Turku
- 4 selected for Nordic Final

Pos.	Rider	Total
1	Ilkka Teromaa	13
2	Veli Pekka Teromaa	12+3
3	Markku Helminen	12+2
4	Kai Niemi	11
5	Rauli Mäkinen	11
6	Seppo Palomäki	11
7	Esko Mylläri	10
8	Ari Koponen	
9	Esa Mattila	7
10	Pekka Hautamäki	5
11	Ismo Kivelä	5
12	Pentti Mattila	5
13	Olli Turkia	4
14	Keijo Mylläri	3
15	Veli Pekka Kunelius	2
16	Veikko Haapamäki	0
17	Veijo Tuoriniemi (res)	0

=== Norwegian Final ===
- 17 April 1977
- (Norway) Sandnes Stadion, Sandnes
- First 5 to Nordic Final

Pos.	Rider	Total
1	Tormod Langli	15
2	Rolf Gramstad	12
3	Stein R.Pedersen	12
4	Jan Gravningen	11
5	Edgar Stangeland	11
6	Tom Godal	
7	Ingve Madland	
8	Trond Helge Skretting	
9	Geir Aasland	

=== Danish Final ===
- 19 May 1977
- (Denmark) Speedway Center, Fredericia
- First 5 to Nordic Final (Ole Olsen seeded to Nordic final)

Pos.	Rider	Total
1	Finn Thomsen	13
2	Erling Rasmussen	12+3
3	Bo Petersen	12+2
4	Gunnar Svendsen	11
5	Finn Rune Jensen	9+3
6	Bent Nørregaard-Jensen	9+2
7	Bent Rasmussen	8
8	Frank Mastrup	8
9	Kaj Kristiansen	7
10	Knud Ellegaard	7
11	Jens Erik Krause Kjaer	7
12	Kurt Bøgh	6
13	Frank Hansen	5
14	Jorgen Walther Johansen	5
15	Otto Larsen	1
16	Preben Rosenkilde	0

=== Continental quarter-finals ===
- Top 32 to Continental semi-finals

Date	Venue	Winner	2nd	3rd
1 May	(West Germany) Hansa Stadium, Bremen	(Poland) Edward Jancarz	(Poland) Marek Cieślak	(West Germany) Egon Muller
8 May	(Austria) Stadion Wiener Neustadt	(Czechoslovakia) Jiří Štancl	(Austria) Siegfried Eder	(Poland) Jerzy Szczakiel
7 May	(Czechoslovakia) Slaný Speedway Stadium, Slaný	(Soviet Union) Sergey Dyuzhev	(Poland) Zenon Plech	(Poland) Jerzy Rembas
8 May	(Hungary) Hajdú Volán Stadion, Debrecen	(Austria) Walter Grubmuller	(Soviet Union) Sergey Uchov	(Czechoslovakia) Václav Verner

== Fourth Round ==
=== Swedish qualification ===
- Top 5 in each heat to Swedish final

(6 May, Avestavallen, Avesta)
Pos	Rider	Points
1	Sören Karlsson	15
2	Jan Andersson	14
3	Jan Simensen	13
4	Karl-Erik Claesson	11
5	Eddie Davidsson	10
6	Lars-Åke Andersson	9
7	Lars Hedlund	9
8	Roger Björkman	8
9	Lars Ericsson	8
10	Jan Holmqvist	5
11	Åke Dovhed]	
12	Leif Johansson	4
13	Björn Persson	3
14	Harald Sandberg (res)	3
15	Bo Wirebrand	2
16	Bernt Johansson	0
17	Tommy Karlsson 0	0

(7 May, Motala Arena, Motala)
Pos	Rider	Points
1	Hasse Holmqvist	14
2	Richard Hellsén	13
3	Christer Sjösten	12
4	Bengt Jansson	12
5	Börje Klingberg	11
6	Conny Samuelsson	9
7	Olle Nygren	8
8	Stephan Johansson	7
9	Therje Henriksson	6
10	Kenneth Selmosson	6
11	Fredrik Lindqvist	5
12	Dirk van der Voet	5
13	Bo Jansson	4
14	Jan Davidsson	4
15	Göran Waltersson	3
16	Per-Olov Dovhjort	1

(8 May, Ljungheden, Västervik)
Pos	Rider	Points
1	Bernt Persson	14
2	Sören Sjösten	14
3	Tommy Johansson	13
4	Tommy Nilsson	13
5	Åke Fridell	9+3
6	Stefan Salmonsson	9+2
7	Willy Karlsson	8
8	Sven Nilsson	8
9	Tomas Pettersson	7
10	Bengt Larsson	7
11	Karl-Fredrik Lindgren	6
12	Börje Ohlsson	4
13	Kjell Bergström	3
14	Nils Eriksson (res)	2
15	Roy Dantanus	2
16	Stefan Hjort	1
17	Per-Åke Gerhardsson (res)	0
18	Göran Hedberg	0

=== American Final ===
- 29 July 1977
- (United States) Costa Mesa Speedway, Los Angeles
- First 2 to Intercontinental final

Pos.	Rider	Total
1	Mike Bast	14
2	Bruce Penhall	13+3
3	Scott Autrey	13+2
4	Steve Bast	11
5	Rick Woods	10
6	Alan Christian	9
7	Mike Curoso	9
8	Dennis Sigalos	8
9	Steve Gresham	8
10	Duane Yarrow	7
11	Larry Shaw	6
12	Rich McMurray	5
13	Dennis Robinson	5
14	Ron McGill	1
15	Dave Faria	1

=== Nordic Final ===
- 29 May 1977
- (Finland) Eteläpuisto, Tampere
- First 4 to Intercontinental final

Pos.	Rider	Total
1	(Denmark) Ole Olsen	15
2	(Finland) Ila Teromaa	14
3	(Denmark) Finn Thomsen	12
4	(Finland) Kai Niemi	12
5	(Denmark) Bo Petersen	10
6	(Norway) Tom Godal	10
7	(Denmark) Finn Jensen	9
8	(Norway) Tormod Langli	8
9	(Denmark) Gunnar Svendsen	7
10	(Finland) Markku Helminen	5
11	(Denmark) Erling Rasmussen	5
12	(Norway) Trond Helge Skretting	4
13	(Finland) Esa Mattila (Res)	3
14	(Finland) Rauli Mäkinen (Res)	2
15	(Norway) Geir Aasland	1
16	(Finland) Pentti Mattila (Res)	1
17	(Norway) Ingve Madland	0
18	(Finland) Ari Koponen	0
19	(Norway) Stein R Pedersen	0

=== Australasian Final ===
- 19 February 1977
- (Australia) Sydney Showground Speedway, Sydney
- First 4 to Intercontinental final

Placing	Rider	Total	1	2	3	4	5	6	7	8	9	10	11	12	13	14	15	16	17	18	19	20	Pts	Pos	21
1	(New Zealand) (5) Ivan Mauger	14		3			3					3					2					3	14	1	3
2	(Australia) (1) Phil Crump	14	3				2				3				3				3				14	2	2
3	(Australia) (16) John Boulger	14				3				3	2						3			3			14	3	1
4	(Australia) (9) Billy Sanders	12			3		1						3					3		2			12	4	
5	(Australia) (12) Phil Herne	11			2					2		2			2						3		11	5	
6	(New Zealand) (4) Barry Briggs	9	1							1				3				2				2	9	6	
7	(Australia) (3) Ricky Day	9	2						3				2				1				1		9	7	
8	(Australia) (13) Mitch Shirra	8				1	0							2		3					2		8	8	
9	(Australia) (6) Mike Farrell	7		2				3			1							1			0		7	9	
10	(Australia) (14) John Titman	7				2		2					1		1							1	7	10	
11	(New Zealand) (7) Colin Farquharson	4		1					2					0	0					1			4	11	
12	(New Zealand) (10) Larry Ross	4			1			1						1			0		1				4	12	
13	(New Zealand) (15) Robin Adlington	3				0			0			1						0	2				3	13	
14	(New Zealand) (11) Mike Fullerton	3			0				1		0					2						E	3	14	
15	(New Zealand) (8) Roger Wright	1		0						0			E			1			0				1	15	
16	(New Zealand) (2) John Goodall	0	0					0				0				0				0			0	16	
R1	(Australia) (R1) Stuart Mountford	0																					0	R1	
R2	(Australia) (R2) Paul O'Neil	0																					0	R2	
Placing	Rider	Total	1	2	3	4	5	6	7	8	9	10	11	12	13	14	15	16	17	18	19	20	Pts	Pos	21

m - exclusion for exceeding two minute time allowance • t - exclusion for touching the tapes • x - other exclusion • e - retired or mechanical failure • f - fell • ns - non-starter • nc - non-classify

gate A - inside	gate B	gate C	gate D - outside

=== British Final ===
- 13 July 1977
- (England) Brandon Stadium, Coventry
- First 5 plus Peter Collins (seeded) to Intercontinental final.

Placing	Rider	Total	1	2	3	4	5	6	7	8	9	10	11	12	13	14	15	16	17	18	19	20	Pts	Pos	21
1	(England) (6) Michael Lee	14		3				2			3							3			3		14	1	
2	(England) (8) Dave Jessup	13		1						3			3			3			3				13	2	
3	(England) (16) Doug Wyer	12				3				2	2						3			2			12	3	
4	(England) (2) John Davis	10	3					0				2				2				3			10	4	
5	(England) (5) Keith White	10		2			2					3					1					2	10	5	
6	(England) (3) Chris Morton	9	X						3				2				2				2		9	6	
7	(England) (14) Bob Kilby	9				2		3					0		3							1	9	7	
8	(England) (11) Gordon Kennett	8			3				1		0					1						3	8	8	
9	(England) (1) Terry Betts	8	2				3				1				1				1				8	9	
10	(England) (9) Alan Wilkinson	7			2		1						1					2		1			7	10	
11	(England) (15) John Louis	6				1			2			0						1	2				6	11	
12	(England) (10) Martin Ashby	5			1			1						3			0		0				5	12	
13	(England) (7) Barry Thomas	2		T					0					0	2					0			2	13	
14	(England) (12) David Gagen	2			0					1		1			0						0		2	14	
15	(England) (4) Neil Middleditch	2	1							0				1				0				0	2	15	
16	(England) (13) Malcolm Simmons	0				F	-							-		-					-		0	16	
R1	(England) (R1) Mick Bell	3		0										2							1		3	R1	
R2	(England) (R2) Frank Smith	0					F									0							0	R2	
Placing	Rider	Total	1	2	3	4	5	6	7	8	9	10	11	12	13	14	15	16	17	18	19	20	Pts	Pos	21

m - exclusion for exceeding two minute time allowance • t - exclusion for touching the tapes • x - other exclusion • e - retired or mechanical failure • f - fell • ns - non-starter • nc - non-classify

gate A - inside	gate B	gate C	gate D - outside

=== Continental semi-finals ===
- 29 May
- (Poland) Stadion żużlowy, Gorzów
- Top 8 to Continental final

Pos.	Rider	Points
1	(Poland) Jerzy Rembas	13+3
2	(Poland) Boguslaw Nowak	13+2
3	(Poland) Jan Mucha	11+3
4	(Czechoslovakia) Václav Verner	11+2
5	(Czechoslovakia) Jan Verner	11+1
6	(Soviet Union) Alexander Juchov	11+0
7	(Soviet Union) Vladimir Rozhanchuck	8
8	(Soviet Union) Grigory Khlinovsky	8
9	(Poland) Andrzej Jurczynski	7
10	(Poland) Zenon Plech	6
11	(Hungary) Istvan Sziraczki	5
12	(Poland) Mieczyslaw Wozniak	5
13	(Poland) Ryszard Fabiszewski (res)	5
14	(Hungary) Laszlo Meszaros	3
15	(Soviet Union) Sergej Djuchev	1
16	(Czechoslovakia) Jindrich Dominik	1
17	(Soviet Union) Pavel Khlynovski	0

- 29 May
- (West Germany) Motodrom Halbemond, Norden
- Top 8 to Continental final

Pos.	Rider	Points
1	(Poland) Marek Cieslak	15
2	(West Germany) Egon Müller	13
3	(Poland) Edward Jancarz	13
4	(Czechoslovakia) Jiří Štancl	13
5	(Soviet Union) Gregorij Ivanov	10
6	(Bulgaria) Angel Eftimov	9
7	(Netherlands) Henny Kroeze	9
8	(Czechoslovakia) Jan Hadek	9
9	(Austria) Hubert Fischbacher	6
10	(Poland) Zdzislaw Dobrucki	5
11	(Soviet Union) Nikolaj Kornev	5
12	(Austria) Siegfried Eder	4
13	(Netherlands) Frits Koning	3
14	(Poland) Henryk Glücklich	3
15	(Soviet Union) Alexander Rachimov	2
16	(Poland) Andrzej Tkocz	2

== Fifth round ==
=== Swedish Final ===
- (Sweden) First 4 over three meetings to World final plus 1 reserve
- R1 (24 May, Vetlanda Motorstadion, Vetlanda)
- R2 (25 May, Norrköping Motorstadion, Norrköping)
- R3 (26 May, Snälltorpet, Eskilstuna)

Pos.	Rider	R1	R2	R3	Total
1	Anders Michanek	15	15	14	44
2	Bengt Jansson	13	11	14	38
3	Bernt Persson	12	14	6	32
4	Tommy Nilsson	10	8	12	30
5	Sören Karlsson	8	11	10	29
6	Jan Andersson	6	9	12	27
7	Richard Hellsén	11	9	7	27
8	Christer Sjösten	9	6	9	24
9	Sören Sjösten	6	8	7	21
10	Tommy Johansson	7	7	5	19
11	Hasse Holmqvist	7	5	3	15
12	Jan Simensen	3	6	6	15
13	Åke Fridell	4	6	4	14
14	Karl-Erik Claesson	4	3	6	13
15	Börje Klingberg	4	0	3	7
16	Eddie Davidsson	1	2	2	5
17	Lars-Åke Andersson	0	-	-	0
18	Conny Samuelsson	-	0	-	0

=== Continental Final ===
- 25 July 1977
- (Soviet Union) Anatoly Stepanov Stadium, Tolyatti
- First 5 to World Final plus 1 reserve

Placing	Rider	Total	1	2	3	4	5	6	7	8	9	10	11	12	13	14	15	16	17	18	19	20	Pts	Pos	21
1	(Czechoslovakia) (9) Jan Verner	13			1		3						3					3		3			13	1	3
2	(West Germany) (4) Egon Muller	13	3							3				3				1				3	13	2	2
3	(Czechoslovakia) (6) Jiří Štancl	13		3				3			3							2			2		13	3	1
4	(Poland) (12) Edward Jancarz	11			3					2		2			3						1		11	4	
5	(Poland) (13) Jan Mucha	11				2	2							2		2					3		11	5	
6	(Soviet Union) (10) Vladimir Rozhanchuk	10			2			2						0			3		3				10	6	
7	(Soviet Union) (11) Grigory Khlinovsky	9			0				2		2					3						2	9	7	
8	(Poland) (14) Bogusław Nowak	7				3		1					2		1							T	7	8	
9	(Poland) (7) Jerzy Rembas	6		0					3					1	F					2			6	9	
10	(Czechoslovakia) (2) Jan Hadek	5	2					0				1				1				1			5	10	
11	(Bulgaria) (8) Angel Jeftimov	3		2						1			F			-			-				3	11	
12	(Netherlands) (15) Henny Kroeze	2				1			1			F						-	-				2	12	
13	(Poland) (16) Marek Cieślak	1				0				F	1						E			E			1	13	
14	(Soviet Union) (5) Georgy Ivanov	1		1			F					-					-					-	1	14	
15	(Poland) (3) Andrzej Jurczyński	0	F						0				F				F				-		0	15	
16	(Czechoslovakia) (1) Václav Verner	0	F				-				-				-				-				0	16	
R1	(Soviet Union) (R1) Nikolay Kornev	5									E	3			2								5	R1	
R2	(Soviet Union) (R2) Nikolay Dubrovin	1					1																1	R2	
Placing	Rider	Total	1	2	3	4	5	6	7	8	9	10	11	12	13	14	15	16	17	18	19	20	Pts	Pos	21

m - exclusion for exceeding two minute time allowance • t - exclusion for touching the tapes • x - other exclusion • e - retired or mechanical failure • f - fell • ns - non-starter • nc - non-classify

gate A - inside	gate B	gate C	gate D - outside

=== Intercontinental Final ===
- 21 August 1977
- (England) White City Stadium, London
- First 7 to World Final

Placing	Rider	Total	1	2	3	4	5	6	7	8	9	10	11	12	13	14	15	16	17	18	19	20	Pts	Pos	21
1	(England) (1) Peter Collins	15	3				3				3				3				3				15	1	
2	(Denmark) (15) Ole Olsen	13				3			2			3						3	2				13	2	
3	(Australia) (12) Billy Sanders	12			2					3		2			2						3		12	3	3
4	(England) (11) Michael Lee	12			1				3		2					3						3	12	4	2
5	(New Zealand) (4) Ivan Mauger	9	2							0				3				2				2	9	5	
6	(Australia) (16) John Boulger	9				2				2	1						1			3			9	6	
7	(Denmark) (3) Finn Thomsen	8	E						0				3				3				2		8	7	
8	(England) (9) John Davis	7			3		2						0					X		2			7	8	3
9	(England) (5) Dave Jessup	7		3			1					1					2					F	7	9	F
10	(Finland) (8) Ila Teromaa	6		1						1			1			2			1				6	10	
11	(England) (7) Doug Wyer	6		2					1					2	0					1			6	11	
12	(Finland) (14) Kai Niemi	5				1		0					2		1							1	5	12	
13	(England) (6) Keith White	4		0				3			0							1			0		4	13	
14	(United States) (13) Bruce Penhall	3				0	0							1		1					1		3	14	
15	(Australia) (10) Phil Crump	2			0			2						E			0		0				2	15	
16	(United States) (2) Mike Bast	1	T					1				0				0				0			1	16	
R1	(England) (R1) Trevor Geer	1	1																				1	R1	
Placing	Rider	Total	1	2	3	4	5	6	7	8	9	10	11	12	13	14	15	16	17	18	19	20	Pts	Pos	21

m - exclusion for exceeding two minute time allowance • t - exclusion for touching the tapes • x - other exclusion • e - retired or mechanical failure • f - fell • ns - non-starter • nc - non-classify

gate A - inside	gate B	gate C	gate D - outside

== World Final ==
- 2 September 1977
- (Sweden) Ullevi, Gothenburg
- Referee: ( (Norway) ) Torrie Kittelsen

Placing	Rider	Total	1	2	3	4	5	6	7	8	9	10	11	12	13	14	15	16	17	18	19	20	Pts	Pos
1	(New Zealand) (7) Ivan Mauger	14		3					2					3	3					3			14	1
2	(England) (14) Peter Collins	13				3		3					2		2							3	13	2
3	(Denmark) (9) Ole Olsen	12+3			2		3						3					3		1			12	3
4	(England) (16) Michael Lee	12+2				2				3	3						2			2			12	4
5	(Denmark) (3) Finn Thomsen	10	2						3				1				1				3		10	5
6	(Sweden) (13) Bengt Jansson	8				1	1							2		3					2		9	6
7	(West Germany) (1) Egon Müller	8	3				2				0				F				3				8	7
8	(Sweden) (5) Anders Michanek	8		2			E					3					3					E	8	8
9	(Australia) (11) Billy Sanders	7			3				1		2					0						E	6	9
10	(Sweden) (4) Tommy Nilsson	6	0							2				E				2				2	6	10
11	(Sweden) (12) Bernt Persson	6			1					1		2			1						1		6	11
12	(Australia) (2) John Boulger	5	1					2				E				2				F			5	12
13	(Poland) (6) Edward Jancarz	4		1				1			1							1			0		4	13
14	(Czech Republic) (15) Jiří Štancl	3				0			0			1						0	2				3	14
15	(Czech Republic) (8) Jan Verner	1		0						0			0			1			X				1	15
16	(Poland) (10) Jan Mucha	0			0			0						1			E		X				1	16
R1	(Sweden) (R1) Sören Karlsson	0																					0	R1
R2	(Poland) (R2) Bogusław Nowak	0																					0	R2
Placing	Rider	Total	1	2	3	4	5	6	7	8	9	10	11	12	13	14	15	16	17	18	19	20	Pts	Pos

m - exclusion for exceeding two minute time allowance • t - exclusion for touching the tapes • x - other exclusion • e - retired or mechanical failure • f - fell • ns - non-starter • nc - non-classify

gate A - inside	gate B	gate C	gate D - outside
