= 1978 Individual Speedway World Championship =

Motorcycle speedway world championship season

Seasons
- ← 1977 1979 →

The 1978 Individual Speedway World Championship was the 33rd edition of the official World Championship to determine the world champion rider.

Ole Olsen won his third world crown. The final was sponsored by the Sunday Mirror and was attended by 86,500. Gordon Kennett took silver on the day of his 25th birthday and American Scott Autrey won the bronze medal run-off defeating Dave Jessup and Jerzy Rembas. Dave Jessup was effectively denied a World title when after leading in heat 3 he suffered a bike malfunction and finished last in the heat. He then scored 11 points from his remaining rides which would have been enough to take the crown if he had won heat 3.

Qualification results.

== Second round ==
=== Australian qualifying ===
- Top 16 to Australian final

Date	Venue	Winner	2nd	3rd
? '77	?	Danny Kennedy	Rod Hunter	John McNeill
26 Nov '77	Carina Speedway, Bundaberg	Billy Sanders	Phil Herne	Paul O'Neil
10 Dec '77	Showground Speedway, Sydney	Billy Sanders	Phil Herne	Paul O'Neil
6 Jan	Claremont Speedway, Perth	Lloyd Cross	Les Leisk	Neil Webb
13 Jan	Rowley Park, Adelaide	John Boulger	Tony Boyle	Rob Maxfield
27 Jan	Rowley Park, Adelaide	John Boulger	Danny Kennedy	Tony Boyle
30 Jan	Showground Speedway, Sydney	John Titman	Phil Herne	Billy Sanders

=== New Zealand qualifying ===
- Top 16 to New Zealand final

Date	Venue	Winner	2nd	3rd
5 Feb	Ruapuna Speedway, Christchurch	Larry Ross	Barry Briggs	James Moore

=== British preliminary round ===
- Rider progress to British qualifying round

Date	Venue	Winner	2nd	3rd
16 April	Rye House Stadium, Hoddesdon	Ted Hubbard	Kelvin Mullarkey	Vic Harding
16 April	Boston Sports Stadium, Boston	Steve Weatherley	Tom Owen	Chris Turner
20 April	Cleveland Park, Middlesbrough	Mike Sampson	Phil Collins	Paul Tyrer
23 April	Mildenhall Stadium, Mildenhall	Martin Yeates	Richard Greer	Bob Coles
27 April	Oxford Stadium, Oxford	Dave Perks	Geoff Bouchard	Steve Finch

=== Continental preliminary round ===
- Riders progress to Continental quarter-finals

Date	Venue	Winner	2nd	3rd
22 April	(Czechoslovakia) Slaný Speedway Stadium, Slaný	(Poland) Boleslaw Proch	(Poland) Jerzy Kochman	(Netherlands) Rudi Muts
23 April	(Socialist Federal Republic of Yugoslavia) Kovinar Stadium, Maribor	(Czechoslovakia) Jan Hádek	(Italy) Sandro Pastoreli	(Bulgaria) Angel Jeftimov

=== Swedish qualification ===
- Top 5 in each heat to Swedish final

(5 May, Avestavallen, Avesta)
Pos	Rider	Points
1	Anders Michanek	15
2	Christer Sjösten	11
3	Börje Klingberg	11
4	Gert Carlsson	11
5	Tomas Pettersson	10
6	Karl-Erik Claesson	9
7	Roger Björkman	9
8	Åke Fridell	8
9	Lars-Olof Karlsson	7
10	Åke Axelsson	7
11	Leif Johansson	6
12	Peter Johansson	5
13	Therje Henriksson	4
14	Bertil Andersson	2
15	Börje Ohlsson (res)	2
16	Hans Frisk	1
17	Willy Karlsson	0
18	Jan Holmqvist	0

(7 May, Målilla Motorbana, Malilla)
Pos	Rider	Points
1	Tommy Nilsson	15
2	Sören Karlsson	13
3	Stefan Salmonsson	13
4	Lillebror Johansson	11
5	Bo Wirebrand	9+3
6	Lars Ericsson	9+2
7	Olle Nygren	8
8	Sven Nilsson	8
9	Bengt Larsson	6
10	Thord Löwdin	5
11	Kenneth Selmosson	4
12	Weine Ström	4
13	Tommy Johansson	3
14	Björn Persson (res)	3
15	Karl-Fredrik Lindgren	3
16	Bengt Gagner	3
17	Åke Andersson (res)	2
18	Åke Dovhed	0

(7 May, Gamla Galgberget, Visby)
Pos	Rider	Points
1	Jan Andersson	14
2	Conny Samuelsson	13
3	Sören Sjösten	13
4	Hasse Holmqvist	12
5	Bernt Persson	12
6	Lars-Åke Andersson	9+3
7	Rolf Sundberg	9+2
8	Kjell Bergström	7
9	Hans Danielsson	7
10	Jan Davidsson	6
11	Torgil Roth	6
12	Håkan Karlsson	5
13	Richard Hellsén	2
14	Eddie Davidsson	1

== Third round ==
=== Continental quarter-finals ===
- Top 32 to Continental semi-finals

Date	Venue	Winner	2nd	3rd
7 May	(Italy) Castiglione Olona Speedway, Varese	(West Germany) Egon Muller	(Soviet Union) Grigory Khlinovsky	(Poland) Jerzy Rembas
7 May	(Hungary) Borsod Volán Stadion, Miskolc	(Soviet Union) Mikhail Starostin	(Poland) Andrzej Huszcza	(Czechoslovakia) Václav Verner
7 May	(West Germany) Breitenthal Stadium, Krumbach	(West Germany) Georg Hack	(Czechoslovakia) Ales Dryml, Sr	(Soviet Union) Nikolay Kornev
7 May	(Poland) Municipal Stadium, Częstochowa	(Poland) Marek Cieślak	(Czechoslovakia) Jiří Štancl	(Czechoslovakia) Zdeněk Kudrna

=== British qualifying round ===
The British qualifying rounds for the World Championship doubled up as qualifying rounds for the Volkswagen/Daily Mirror Grand Prix. Therefore, many non-British riders rode in these meetings scoring points towards the Volkswagen/Daily Mirror Grand Prix qualification - but their scores didn't count towards World Championship qualification. The top 32 British riders qualified for the British semi-finals.

Date	Venue	Winner	2nd	3rd
11 May	Wimbledon Stadium, London	Peter Collins	Bob Kilby	Dave Jessup
11 May	Owlerton Stadium, Sheffield	Ivan Mauger	Doug Wyer	Steve Bastable
12 May	Hackney Wick Stadium, London	Dave Jessup	Terry Betts	Finn Thomsen
13 May	Hyde Road, Manchester	Peter Collins	Chris Morton	Bobby Beaton
13 May	King's Lynn Stadium, King's Lynn	Michael Lee	John Titman	Malcolm Simmons
13 May	Brandon Stadium, Coventry	Alan Molyneux	Keith White	Billy Sanders
15 May	Smallmead Stadium, Reading	Gordon Kennett	Billy Sanders	John Davis
15 May	County Ground Stadium, Exeter	Phil Crump	Václav Verner	Mike Farrell
15 May	Birchfield Ladbroke Stadium, Birmingham	Ray Wilson	John Titman	Mike Lanham
16 May	Leicester Stadium, Leicester	Scott Autrey	John Titman	Les Collins
17 May	Wimborne Road, Poole	Tony Davey	Václav Verner	Malcolm Simmons
17 May	White City Stadium, London	Kai Niemi	Gordon Kennett	Ila Teromaa
17 May	The Boulevard, Hull	Ivan Mauger	Bobby Beaton	Graham Drury
18 May	Abbey Stadium, Swindon	Peter Collins	Jan Andersson	Dave Perks
18 May	Foxhall Stadium, Ipswich	John Louis	Michael Lee	Tony Davey
19 May	Monmore Green, Wolverhampton	Gordon Kennett	Hans Nielsen	Jim McMillan
19 May	Knowle Stadium, Bristol	Joe Owen	Tormod Langli	Reg Wilson
20 May	Dudley Wood Stadium, Dudley	Alan Grahame	John Davis	Bruce Cribb
20 May	The Shay, Halifax	Eric Broadbelt	Ian Cartwright	Phil Collins

=== Finland Final ===
- First 2 to Nordic Final 1978
- (Finland) 14 August 1977, Eteläpuisto, Tampere

Pos.	Rider	Total
1	Kai Niemi	14
2	Ilkka Teromaa	13
3	Rauli Mäkinen	12
4	Seppo Palomäki	12
5	Markku Helminen	11
6	Pekka Paljakka	10
7	Pekka Hautamäki	9
8	Timo Kiansten	8
9	Olli Turkia	8
10	Veijo Tuoriniemi	6
11	Veli Pekka Kunelius	6
12	Ari Koponen	3
13	Keijo Mylläri	3
14	Esa Mattila	3
15	Raimo Posti	2
16	Jorma Karjalainen	0

=== Norwegian Final ===
- (Norway) 3 riders to Nordic Final

=== Swedish Final ===
- 30 May 1978
- (Sweden) Kumla Motorstadion, Kumla
- First 7 to Nordic Final + 1 reserve

Pos.	Rider	Total
1	Anders Michanek	14
2	Jan Andersson	14
3	Bernt Persson	11
4	Tommy Nilsson	11
5	Lars Ericsson	10
6	Sören Karlsson	10
7	Christer Sjösten	10
8	Bo Wirebrand	8
9	Bengt Jansson	6
10	Stefan Salomonsson	6
11	Hasse Holmqvist	5
12	Conny Samuelsson	5
13	Borje Klingberg	4
14	Gert Carlsson	3
15	Tommy Pettersson	1
16	Sören Sjösten	1
17	Lars-Åke Andersson	1

=== Danish Final ===
- 15 May 1978
- (Denmark) Fjelsted Speedway Stadium, Harndrup
- First 2 to Nordic Final (Ole Olsen and Finn Thomsen seeded through)

Pos.	Rider	Total
1	Bent Rasmussen	13+3
2	Kristian Præstbro	13+2
3	Hans Nielsen	12+3
4	Mike Lohmann	12+2
5	Alf Busk	12+1
6	Bo Petersen	10
7	Finn Rune Jensen	9
8	Knud Ellegaard	8
9	Klaus Lohmann	6
10	Kurt Bøgh	4
11	Steen Mastrup	4
12	Arne Kruse	4
13	Erling Rasmussen	3
14	Gunnar Svendsen	3
15	Bent Nørregaard-Jensen	3
16	Jens Kjaer	2

=== Australian Final ===
- 4 February 1978
- (Australia) Brisbane Exhibition Ground, Brisbane
- To 8 to Australasian Final

Pos.	Rider	Total
1	John Titman	15
2	Lloyd Cross	13
3	Mick McKeon	12
4	John Boulger	11
5	Mike Farrell	9
6	Phil Herne	9
7	Billy Sanders	9
8	Robert Maxfield	8
9	Glenn McDonald	7
10	Phil Crump	7
11	Wayne Forrest	6
12	Tony Boyle	5
13	Danny Kennedy	4
14	Ricky Day	3
15	Phil Bass	2
16	Stuart Mountford	0

=== New Zealand Final ===
- 11 February 1978
- (New Zealand) Te Marua Speedway, Wellington
- To 8 to Australasian Final

Pos.	Rider	Heat Scores	Total
1	Larry Ross	3,3,3,3,3	15
2	Barry Briggs	2,3,3,2,2	12
3	Mike Fullerton	1,3,2,3,3	12
4	Mitch Shirra	3,2,E,3,3	11
5	Roger Wright	2,3,3,1,2	11
6	Colin Tucker	3,2,2,2,2	11
7	Colin Farquharson	1,1,3,2,3	10
8	James Moore	3,1,0,0,2	6
9	Allan Brown	0,0,2,3,1	6
10	Greg Joynt	1,2,2,0,0	5
11	Paul Fewinks	2,2,0,1,F	5
12	Max Brown	F,0,1,2,1	4
13	Gavin Miller	2,1,1,0,0	4
14	Cliff Anderson	0,0,1,1,1	3
15	Patrick Pawson	1,E,1,1,0	3
16	Kris Berrigan	0,1,0,0,1	2

== Fourth round ==
=== British semi-finals ===
- 12 July
- (England) Wimborne Road, Poole
- Top 8 to British final

Pos.	Rider	Points
1	Tony Davey	12
2	Gordon Kennett	12
3	Dave Jessup	11
4	John Davis	11
5	Steve Bastable	10
6	John Louis	10
7	Malcolm Simmons	10
8	Alan Grahame	9
9	Terry Betts	8
10	Bob Kilby	7
11	Trevor Geer	6
12	Neil Middleditch	4
13	Mike Lanham	4
14	Colin Richardson	4
15	Eric Broadbelt	2
16	Geoff Bouchard	1

- 13 July
- (England) Owlerton Stadium, Sheffield
- Top 8 to British final

Pos.	Rider	Points
1	Peter Collins	15
2	Chris Morton	13
3	Michael Lee	13
4	Les Collins	10
5	Reg Wilson	10
6	Dave Morton	9
7	Doug Wyer	8
8	Jim McMillan	7
9	Phil Collins	7
10	Bobby Beaton	6
11	Dave Perks	5
12	Ian Cartwright	5
13	Keith White	4
14	Alan Molyneux	4
15	Richard Greer	3
16	Ray Wilson	1

=== American selection ===
- No qualifying, the AMA selected two riders to represent the US in the Intercontinental final.

=== Australasian Final ===
- 12 February 1978
- (New Zealand) Western Springs Stadium, Auckland
- First 4 to Intercontinental Final, Ivan Mauger seeded through

Pos.	Rider	Heat Scores	Total
1	(New Zealand) Mitch Shirra	2,2,3,3,3	13
2	(Australia) Mick McKeon	3,3,2.5,2,1	11.5
3	(Australia) John Titman	2,3,T,3,3	11
4	(Australia) Mike Farrell	3,1,1,3,3	11
5	(New Zealand) Mike Fullerton	1,3,3,1,2	10
6	(Australia) Phil Herne	1,2,2,3,2	10
7	(Australia) John Boulger	3,3,2,T,1	9
8	(Australia) Billy Sanders	3,T,3,F,3	9
9	(New Zealand) Colin Farquharson	0,2,2,2,2	8
10	(New Zealand) Roger Wright	1,1,2.5,1,1	6.5
11	(Australia) Robert Maxfield	1,1,1,2,1	6
12	(New Zealand) Larry Ross	2,E,E,2,2	6
13	(New Zealand) James Moore	2,1,1,1,0	5
14	(New Zealand) Colin Tucker	0,2,1,0,0	3
15	(New Zealand) Allan Brown	0,0,0,0,0	0
16	(Australia) Lloyd Cross	F,-,-,-,-	0
R1	(New Zealand) Greg Joynt	0,0,1,T	1
R2	(New Zealand) Cliff Anderson	0,0,0	0

=== Nordic Final ===
- 8 June 1978
- (Sweden) Norrköping Motorstadion, Norrköping
- First 9 to Intercontnental Final

Placing	Rider	Total	1	2	3	4	5	6	7	8	9	10	11	12	13	14	15	16	17	18	19	20	Pts	Pos	21
1	(Denmark) (2) Ole Olsen	15	3					3				3				3				3			15	1	
2	(Sweden) (7) Bernt Persson	14		3					3					3	3					2			14	2	
3	(Denmark) (9) Finn Thomsen	11			2		2						3					3		1			11	3	3
4	(Finland) (15) Kai Niemi	11				3			2			2						1	3				11	4	2
5	(Finland) (4) Ila Teromaa	10	2							3				2				2				1	10	5	
6	(Sweden) (8) Tommy Nilsson	10		2						2			2			2			2				10	6	
7	(Denmark) (13) Kristian Præstbro	9				1	3							1		1					3		9	7	
8	(Sweden) (16) Anders Michanek	8				2				1	2						3			0			8	8	
9	(Sweden) (3) Jan Andersson	6	1						0				1				2				2		6	9	3
10	(Norway) (6) Tom Godal	6		1				1			3							0			1		6	10	2
11	(Sweden) (11) Sören Karlsson	6			3				1		0					0						2	6	11	1
12	(Denmark) (14) Bent Rasmussen	5				0		0					0		2							3	5	12	
13	(Sweden) (10) Christer Sjösten	4			0			2						0			1		1				4	13	
14	(Sweden) (1) Lars Ericsson	3	0				1				1				1				0				3	14	
15	(Norway) (5) Audun Ove Olsen	1		0			0					1					0					0	1	15	
16	(Norway) (12) Stein Roar Pedersen	1			1					0		0			0						0		1	16	
Placing	Rider	Total	1	2	3	4	5	6	7	8	9	10	11	12	13	14	15	16	17	18	19	20	Pts	Pos	21

m - exclusion for exceeding two minute time allowance • t - exclusion for touching the tapes • x - other exclusion • e - retired or mechanical failure • f - fell • ns - non-starter • nc - non-classify

gate A - inside	gate B	gate C	gate D - outside

=== Continental semi-finals ===
- 28 May
- (West Germany) Rottalstadion, Pocking
- Top 8 to Continental final

Pos.	Rider	Points
1	(West Germany) Hans Wassermann	15
2	(Czechoslovakia) Jiří Štancl	13
3	(Poland) Marek Cieslak	11
4	(Poland) Boleslaw Proch	11
5	(Czechoslovakia) Emil Sova	10
6	(Czechoslovakia) Zdenek Kudrna	9
7	(Poland) Piotr Pyszny	9
8	(Soviet Union) Nikolaj Kornev	8
9	(West Germany) Georg Hack	8
10	(Czechoslovakia) Aleš Dryml Sr.	7
11	(Poland) Jerzy Kochman	5
12	(Soviet Union) Vladimir Paznikov	5
13	(Czechoslovakia) Karel Vobornik	3
14	(Czechoslovakia) Petr Kucera	2
15	(Netherlands) Rudy Muts	2
16	(Netherlands) Frits Koppe	1

- 28 May
- (West Germany) Motodrom Halbemond, Norden
- Top 8 to Continental final

Pos.	Rider	Points
1	(West Germany) Alois Wiesböck	15
2	(West Germany) Egon Müller	14
3	(Poland) Ryszard Fabiszewski	12
4	(Czechoslovakia) Jan Verner	9
5	(Italy) Francesco Biginato	9
6	(Hungary) Istvan Sziraczki	9
7	(Poland) Jerzy Rembas	9
8	(Czechoslovakia) Petr Ondrašík	9
9	(Poland) Boguslav Nowak	8
10	(Czechoslovakia) Václav Verner	8
11	(Poland) Andrzej Huszcza	5
12	(Soviet Union) Michail Starostin	4
13	(Soviet Union) Grigory Khlinovsky	4
14	(Hungary) Laszlo Meszaros	3
15	(Czechoslovakia) Jan Hadek	1
16	(Czechoslovakia) Jiri Jirout	1

== Fifth round ==
=== British Final ===
- 16 August 1978
- (England) Brandon Stadium, Coventry
- First 4 to World Final

Placing	Rider	Total	1	2	3	4	5	6	7	8	9	10	11	12	13	14	15	16	17	18	19	20	Pts	Pos	21
1	(England) (7) Michael Lee	14		3					3					3	3					2			14	1	
2	(England) (5) Dave Jessup	12		2			3					1					3					3	12	2	
3	(England) (16) Malcolm Simmons	11				0				3	3						2			3			11	3	
4	(England) (9) Gordon Kennett	10			2		2						2					3		1			10	4	3
5	(England) (1) Steve Bastable	10	3				1				2				1				3				10	5	2
6	(England) (12) Chris Morton	10			E					2		3			2						3		10	6	1
7	(England) (13) Tony Davey	8				3	0							2		3					0		8	7	
8	(England) (15) John Davis	8				2			2			2						2	0				8	8	
9	(England) (10) Les Collins	7			3			0						1			1		2				7	9	
10	(England) (6) Peter Collins	6		1				3			E							E			2		6	10	
11	(England) (8) Reg Wilson	6		0						0			3			2			1				6	11	
12	(England) (2) Doug Wyer	4	1					2				X				1				E			4	12	
13	(England) (14) Alan Grahame	4				1		1					0		0							2	4	13	
14	(Scotland) (4) Jim McMillan	3	2							1				0				T				0	3	14	
15	(England) (11) John Louis	3			1				0		1					0						1	3	15	
16	(England) (3) Dave Morton	3	0						1				1				0				1		3	16	
R3	(England) (R3) Mick Bell	1																1					1	R3	
Placing	Rider	Total	1	2	3	4	5	6	7	8	9	10	11	12	13	14	15	16	17	18	19	20	Pts	Pos	21

m - exclusion for exceeding two minute time allowance • t - exclusion for touching the tapes • x - other exclusion • e - retired or mechanical failure • f - fell • ns - non-starter • nc - non-classify

gate A - inside	gate B	gate C	gate D - outside

=== Continental Final ===
- 2 July 1978
- (Czechoslovakia) Markéta Stadium, Prague
- First 6 to World Final plus 1 reserve

Placing	Rider	Total	1	2	3	4	5	6	7	8	9	10	11	12	13	14	15	16	17	18	19	20	Pts	Pos	21
1	(West Germany) (5) Hans Wassermann	14		3			2					3					3					3	14	1	
2	(Czechoslovakia) (9) Jiří Štancl	14			3		3						3					3		2			14	2	
3	(Poland) (11) Marek Cieślak	11			1				3		3					3						1	11	3	
4	(Czechoslovakia) (16) Petr Ondrašík	11				3				2	1						2			3			11	4	
5	(Czechoslovakia) (1) Jan Verner	11	3				1				2				2				3				11	5	
6	(Poland) (7) Jerzy Rembas	9		2					0					3	3					1			9	6	
7	(Czechoslovakia) (8) Zdeněk Kudrna	9		1						3			2			1			2				9	7	
8	(Poland) (2) Boleslaw Proch	8	2					2				2				2				0			8	8	
9	(West Germany) (14) Alois Wiesböck	6				2		3					F		1							0	6	9	
10	(Italy) (4) Francesco Biginato	6	1							1				0				2				2	6	10	
11	(Hungary) (10) Janosz Sziracky	5			0			1						2			1		1				5	11	
12	(Soviet Union) (13) Nikolay Kornev	4				1	0							1		0					2		4	12	
13	(Czechoslovakia) (6) Emil Sova	4		0				0			0							1			3		4	13	
14	(Poland) (3) Ryszard Fabiszewski	4	0						2				1				0				1		4	14	
15	(West Germany) (12) Egon Muller	2			2					0		E			E						-		2	15	
16	(Poland) (15) Piotr Pyszny	2				X			1			1						0	0				2	16	
R1	(Poland) (R1) Bogusław Nowak	0																					0	R1	
R2	(West Germany) (R2) Georg Hack	0																					0	R2	
Placing	Rider	Total	1	2	3	4	5	6	7	8	9	10	11	12	13	14	15	16	17	18	19	20	Pts	Pos	21

m - exclusion for exceeding two minute time allowance • t - exclusion for touching the tapes • x - other exclusion • e - retired or mechanical failure • f - fell • ns - non-starter • nc - non-classify

gate A - inside	gate B	gate C	gate D - outside

=== Intercontinental Final ===
- 2 July 1978
- (Denmark) Speedway Center, Fredericia
- First 7 to World Final + 1 reserve

Placing	Rider	Total	1	2	3	4	5	6	7	8	9	10	11	12	13	14	15	16	17	18	19	20	Pts	Pos	21
1	(Denmark) (3) Ole Olsen	13	2						3				2				3				3		13	1	3
2	(New Zealand) (11) Ivan Mauger	13			3				2		2					3						3	13	2	2
3	(United States) (1) Scott Autrey	11	3				X				3				2				3				11	3	3
4	(Finland) (16) Ila Teromaa	11				3				3	1						1			3			11	4	2
5	(Sweden) (13) Jan Andersson	11				2	2							3		2					2		11	5	1
6	(Sweden) (9) Anders Michanek	10			2		1						3					3		1			10	6	
7	(Australia) (5) John Titman	10		2			3					1					2					2	10	7	
8	(Sweden) (6) Bernt Persson	9		3				3			0							2			1		9	8	
9	(Finland) (2) Kai Niemi	8	1					2				2				1				2			8	9	
10	(United States) (12) Steve Gresham	7			X					1		3			3						X		7	10	
11	(Denmark) (4) Finn Thomsen	5	0							2				2				E				1	5	11	
12	(Australia) (15) Mike Farrell	5				1			1			0						1	2				5	12	
13	(Australia) (10) Mick McKeon	3			1			1						1			0		0				3	13	
14	(Denmark) (8) Kristian Præstbro	2		0						0			1			0			1				2	14	
15	(New Zealand) (7) Mitch Shirra	1		1					F					-	-					-			1	15	
16	(Sweden) (14) Tommy Nilsson	1				0		0					0		1							0	1	16	
R1	(Denmark) (R1) Bert Rasmussen	0					0								0								0	R1	
R2	(Denmark) (R2) Tom Jenssen	0												0						0			0	R2	
Placing	Rider	Total	1	2	3	4	5	6	7	8	9	10	11	12	13	14	15	16	17	18	19	20	Pts	Pos	21

m - exclusion for exceeding two minute time allowance • t - exclusion for touching the tapes • x - other exclusion • e - retired or mechanical failure • f - fell • ns - non-starter • nc - non-classify

gate A - inside	gate B	gate C	gate D - outside

== World Final ==
- 2 September 1978
- (England) Wembley Stadium, London

Placing	Rider	Total	1	2	3	4	5	6	7	8	9	10	11	12	13	14	15	16	17	18	19	20	Pts	Pos	21
1	(Denmark) (15) Ole Olsen	13				3			2			2						3	3				13	1	
2	(England) (13) Gordon Kennett	12				2	3							2		2					3		12	2	
3	(United States) (2) Scott Autrey	11	3					2				1				3				2			11	3	3
4	(England) (12) Dave Jessup	11			E					3		3			3						2		11	4	2
5	(Poland) (9) Jerzy Rembas	11			3		1						3					1		3			11	5	1
6	(England) (1) Malcolm Simmons	10	2				2				2				2				2				10	6	
7	(England) (6) Michael Lee	9		3				1			3							2			0		9	7	
8	(New Zealand) (14) Ivan Mauger	8				F		3					2		0							3	8	8	
9	(Australia) (16) John Titman	7				1				2	F						3			1			7	9	
10	(Sweden) (3) Anders Michanek	7	1						3				0				2				1		7	10	
11	(Finland) (4) Ila Teromaa	6	0							1				3				F				2	6	11	
12	(Czechoslovakia) (11) Jan Verner	5			2				1		1					0						1	5	12	
13	(Poland) (8) Marek Cieślak	5		2						0			1			1			1				5	13	
14	(Sweden) (10) Jan Andersson	3			1			0						1			1		0				3	14	
15	(Czechoslovakia) (7) Jiří Štancl	2		1					0					0	1					0			2	15	
16	(Czechoslovakia) (5) Petr Ondrašík	0		F			0					0					0					0	0	16	
R1	(England) (R1) Steve Bastable	0																					0	R1	
R2	(Sweden) (R2) Bernt Persson	0																					0	R2	
R3	(Czechoslovakia) (R3) Zdeněk Kudrna	0																					0	R3	
Placing	Rider	Total	1	2	3	4	5	6	7	8	9	10	11	12	13	14	15	16	17	18	19	20	Pts	Pos	21

m - exclusion for exceeding two minute time allowance • t - exclusion for touching the tapes • x - other exclusion • e - retired or mechanical failure • f - fell • ns - non-starter • nc - non-classify

gate A - inside	gate B	gate C	gate D - outside
