= 1975 Individual Speedway World Championship =

Motorcycle speedway world championship season

Seasons
- ← 1974 1976 →

The 1975 Individual Speedway World Championship was the 30th edition of the official World Championship to determine the world champion rider.

Ole Olsen won his second World title in front of 81,000 at Wembley Stadium in London with a 15-point maximum from his five rides. Defending champion Anders Michanek finished second and England's John Louis won the run-off for the bronze medal, defeating four time world champion Ivan Mauger. Some criticism was aimed at the track surface which was described as dusty and dry.

== Format changes ==
The format of the Championship changed for the 1975 event. This time the British riders (not including Commonwealth riders for the first time) were allowed four places in the World Final to be held in England. All other nations had to go through the European Final route to provide the remaining 12 riders for the World Final. The European Final qualification route included a new Intercontinental Final which feature riders from the United States for the first time for many years.

== First round ==
=== Swedish qualifying ===
- Top 5 in each heat to Swedish final

(1 May, Motorbanen Hagalund Lindesberg)
Pos	Rider	Points
1	Bernt Persson	14
2	Tommy Jansson	14
3	Sören Sjösten	12
4	Eddie Davidsson	12
5	Bo Josefsson	11
6	Richard Hellsén	10
7	Bo Wirebrand	9
8	Kjell Bergström	8
9	Åke Dovhed	6
10	Sven Nilsson	6
11	Berndt Johansson	5
12	Bengt Larsson	4
13	Sven-Olof Lindh	4
14	Sune Stark	2
15	Ragnar Holm	2
16	Gunnar Ärlevik	1

(1 May, Målilla (Motorbana) Målilla)
Pos	Rider	Points
1	Jan Simensen	15
2	Christer Sjösten	13
3	Bengt Jansson	12
4	Conny Samuelsson	11
5	Åke Andersson	11
6	Peter Smith	10
7	Tommy Nilsson	9
8	Jan Johansson	8
9	Sigvard Johansson	7
10	Lars-Inge Hultberg	7
11	Karl-Erik Claesson	4
12	Stefan Johansson	3
13	Billy Syrén	3
14	Leif Mellberg	2
15	Sven-Erik Andersson	2
16	Bo Åstrand	1
17	Bertil Andersson (res)	1

(1 May, Gamla Galgberget Visby)
Pos	Rider	Points
1	Tommy Johansson	15
2	Hasse Holmqvist	14
3	Sören Karlsson	13
4	Jan Andersson	12
5	Leif Enecrona	9
6	Stefan Salmonsson	8
7	Lars-Åke Andersson	8
8	Stephan Johansson	8
9	Dirk van der Voet	8
10	Gunnar Malmqvist	7
11	Börje Klingberg	6
12	Christer Löfqvist	4
13	Curt Nyqvist	4
14	Käll Haage	2
15	Tommy Wedén	2
16	Eskil Jonsson	0
17	Rolf Jacobsson (res)	0

=== Continental qualifying ===
- Riders progress to Continental quarter-finals

Date	Venue	Winner	2nd	3rd
4 May	(Austria) Stadion Wiener Neustadt, Wiener Neustadt	(West Germany) Alois Wiesböck	(Austria) Adi Funk	(Czechoslovakia) Josef Minarik
4 May	(Italy) La Favorita, Sarego	(East Germany) Otto Barth	(Italy) Giuseppe Marzotto	(Bulgaria) Angeł Eftimov

== Second round ==
=== British/Commonwealth preliminary round ===
- Riders progress to British/Commonwealth qualifying round

Date	Venue	Winner	2nd	3rd
19 April	Kingsmead Stadium, Canterbury	Bob Humphreys	Les Rumsey	Nigel Wasley
22 April	Wessex Stadium, Weymouth	Paul Gachet	Trevor Geer	Ian Cartwright
27 April	Rye House Stadium, Hoddesdon	Phil Herne	Joe Owen	Alan Sage
30 April	Odsal Stadium, Bradford	Terry Kelly	Sid Sheldrick	Geoff Bouchard

=== Continental quarter-finals ===
- Top 32 to Continental semi-finals

Date	Venue	Winner	2nd	3rd
18 May	(West Germany) Breitenthal Stadium, Krumbach	(Czechoslovakia) Jan Hadek	(Poland) Marek Cieślak	(Soviet Union) Valery Gordeev
18 May	(Socialist Federal Republic of Yugoslavia) Matija Gubec Stadium, Krško	(Poland) Henryk Glücklich	(Czechoslovakia) Josef Minarik	(Soviet Union) Vladimir Nesterov
18 May	(Czechoslovakia) Trade Union Stadium, Ostrava	(Czechoslovakia) Jiří Štancl	(Soviet Union) Vladimir Gordeev	(Poland) Paweł Waloszek
18 May	(Hungary) Borsod Volán Stadion, Miskolc	(Poland) Edward Jancarz	(Hungary) Isztvan Sziracki	(Soviet Union) Viktor Trofimov

=== Norwegian Final ===
- 14 September 1974
- (Norway) Nærbø, Nærbø
- Top 2 (+1 seeded) to Nordic final 1975

Pos.	Rider	Points
1	Dag Lövaas	14
2	Edgar Stangeland	13
3	Ulf Lövaas	13
4	Reidar Eide	11
5	Oyvind S. Berg	11

=== Finland Final ===
- (Finland) Eteläpuisto, Tampere
- 25 August 1974, first (+1 seeded riders) to 1975 Nordic final

Pos.	Rider	Total
1	Kari Vuoristo	15
2	Matti Olin	14
3	Veli Pekka Teromaa	13
4	Kai Niemi	12
5	Markku Helminen	10
6	Ari Hiljanen	9
7	Pekka Paljakka	9
8	Seppo Palomäki	7
9	Seppo Santala	6
10	Juhani Eronen	5
11	Esa Mattila	5
12	Reino Santala	5
13	Pekka Kortelainen	2
14	Harry Skofeldt	2
15	Erkki Etelatahti	1
16	Pentti Mattila	1

=== Danish Final ===
- Top 3 to Nordic final

=== Swedish Final ===
- 21 May 1975
- (Sweden) Norrköping Motorstadion, Norrköping
- First 8 to Nordic Final

Placing	Rider	Total	1	2	3	4	5	6	7	8	9	10	11	12	13	14	15	16	17	18	19	20	Pts	Pos
1	(Sweden) (1) Tommy Jansson	14	3				3				3				2				3				14	1
2	(Sweden) (5) Anders Michanek	13		3			2					3					3					2	13	2
3	(Sweden) (14) Bernt Persson	13				3		3					3		3							1	13	3
4	(Sweden) (4) Sören Karlsson	12	1							3				3				3				2	12	4
5	(Sweden) (2) Tommy Johansson	11	2					2				2				2				3			11	5
6	(Sweden) (7) Bengt Jansson	10		2					3					2	1					2			10	6
7	(Sweden) (8) Sören Sjösten	10		1						2			2			3			2				10	7
8	(Sweden) (10) Hasse Holmqvist	7			3			1						0			2		0				6	8
9	(Sweden) (16) Christer Sjösten	5+3				2				1	0						1			1			5	9
10	(Sweden) (3) Åke Andersson	5+2	0						1				1				0				3		5	10
11	(Sweden) (9) Bo Josefsson	4			2		0						0					2		0			4	11
12	(Sweden) (15) Eddie Davidsson	4				0			2			1						1	0				4	12
13	(Sweden) (13) Jan Simensen	4				1	1							1		0					1		4	13
14	(Sweden) (12) Stefan Salomonsson	3			1					0		0			0						2		3	14
15	(Sweden) (6) Leif Enecrona	1		0				0			1							0			0		1	15
16	(Sweden) (11) Conny Samuelsson	0			0				0		-					-						-	0	16
	(Sweden) (17) Peter Smith	2									2											0	2	
	(Sweden) (18) Richard Hellsen	1														1							1	
Placing	Rider	Total	1	2	3	4	5	6	7	8	9	10	11	12	13	14	15	16	17	18	19	20	Pts	Pos

m - exclusion for exceeding two minute time allowance • t - exclusion for touching the tapes • x - other exclusion • e - retired or mechanical failure • f - fell • ns - non-starter • nc - non-classify

gate A - inside	gate B	gate C	gate D - outside

== Third round ==
=== Continental semi-finals ===
- 29 May
- (West Germany) Olching Speedwaybahn, Olching
- Top 8 to Continental final

Pos.	Rider	Points
1	(Soviet Union) Valerij Gordeev	15
2	(Poland) Edward Jancarz	12
3	(Poland) Zenon Plech	12
4	(Soviet Union) Michail Starostin	10
5	(West Germany) Manfred Poschenreider	10
6	(Soviet Union) Viktor Trofimov	10
7	(Poland) Boguslaw Nowak	9
8	(Poland) Marek Cieslak	9
9	(Poland) Andrzej Jurczynski	8
10	(Netherlands) Henny Kroeze	8
11	(Soviet Union) Vladimir Rozanchuk	5
12	(Czechoslovakia) Jan Hadek	4
13	(Czechoslovakia) Jan Klokocka	4
14	(Soviet Union) Georgij Markatanov	2
15	(Hungary) Istvan Sziraczki	2
16	(Poland) Andrzej Wyglenda	0
17	(Hungary) Janos Szöke (res)	0

- 31 May
- (Czechoslovakia) Markéta Stadium, Prague
- Top 8 to Continental final

Pos.	Rider	Points
1	(Poland) Piotr Bruzda	12
2	(Czechoslovakia) Jan Verner	11
3	(Soviet Union) Vladimir Gordeev	11
4	(Poland) Paweł Waloszek	10
5	(Poland) Henryk Glücklich	10
6	(Soviet Union) Viktor Kalmykov	10
7	(Soviet Union) Nikolaj Kornev	10
8	(Czechoslovakia) Jiří Štancl	9+3
9	(Czechoslovakia) Franciszek Stach	9+2
10	(Soviet Union) Vladimir Nesterov	8
11	(Soviet Union) Georgij Ivanov	5
12	(Czechoslovakia) Petr Kucera	5
13	(Czechoslovakia) Václav Verner	4
14	(Poland) Andrzej Tkocz	4
15	(Czechoslovakia) Josef Minarik	1
16	(Poland) Jerzy Szczakiel	1

=== British/Commonwealth qualifying round ===
- Top 5 Commonwealth riders to Intercontinental final, top 32 British riders to British semi-finals

Date	Venue	Winner	2nd	3rd
16 May	Somerton Park, Newport	Bob Kilby	Tom Owen	John Boulger
16 May	Mmonmore Green, Wolverhampton	Ivan Mauger	Arthur Price	Chris Morton
17 May	The Shay, Halifax	Chris Pusey	Dave Morton	Charlie Monk
19 May	County Ground Stadium, Exeter	Ivan Mauger	Steve Reinke	Martin Ashby
19 May	Smallmead Stadium, Reading	Terry Betts	Bob Humphreys	Bobby Beaton
20 May	Leicester Stadium, Leicester	Ray Wilson	Billy Sanders	Bob Valentine
21 May	Wimborne Road, Poole	Malcolm Simmons	Paul Tyrer	Neil Street
21 May	The Boulevard, Hull	Bruce Cribb	Jim McMillan	John Boulger
24 May	King's Lynn Stadium, King's Lynn	Ray Bales	Mick Hines	Terry Betts
24 May	Brandon Stadium, Coventry	Nigel Boocock	George Hunter	Malcolm Simmons
29 May	Owlerton Stadium, Sheffield	Ray Wilson	Chris Morton	Carl Glover
29 May	Oxford Stadium, Oxford	Phil Herne	Dave Jessup	Richard Greer
29 May	Foxhall Stadium, Ipswich	John Louis	Billy Sanders	Jim McMillan
30 May	Wimbledon Stadium. London	Peter Collins	Colin Gooddy	Eric Broadbelt
30 May	Hackney Wick Stadium, London	Dave Morton	Ray Wilson	Billy Sanders
31 May	Abbey Stadium, Swindon	Ivan Mauger	Martin Ashby	Barry Thomas
31 May	Dudley Wood Stadium, Dudley	Arthur Price	George Hunter	John Boulger
31 May	Hyde Road, Manchester	Alan Wilkinson	Chris Morton	Peter Collins

=== Nordic Final ===
- 1 June 1975
- (Norway) Geiteryggen Speedwaybane, Skien
- First 9 to Intercontinental Final

Pos.	Rider	Heat Scores	Total
1	(Denmark) Ole Olsen	3,2,3,3,3	14
2	(Sweden) Tommy Jansson	2,3,2,3,3	13
3	(Norway) Dag Lovaas	3,0,3,3,3	12+3
4	(Sweden) Bernt Persson	2,3,2,3,2	12+2
5	(Norway) Reidar Eide	3,3,1,2,1	10
6	(Sweden) Tommy Johansson	2,1,3,1,3	10
7	(Sweden) Hasse Holmqvist	1,2,2,1,2	8
8	(Sweden) Anders Michanek	F,1,3,2,2	8
9	(Sweden) Bengt Jansson	0,3,0,2,2	7
10	(Norway) Edgar Stangeland	0,2,1,2,1	6
11	(Finland) Ila Teromaa	2,2,1,0,F	5
12	(Denmark) Finn Thomsen	3,F,0,0,1	4
13	(Sweden) Sören Sjösten	1,1,1,1,E	4
14	(Sweden) Sören Karlsson	1,0,2,0,0	3
15	(Finland) Kari Vuoristo	0,0,0,1,0	1
16	(Denmark) Bent Nørregaard-Jensen	F,-,-,-,-	0
R1	(Norway) Tormod Langli	1,0	1
R2	(Norway) Helge Langli	1,0,1	2

== Fourth round ==
=== British semi-finals ===
- 24 June
- (England) Leicester Stadium, Leicester
- Top 8 to British final

Pos.	Rider	Points
1	(England) Martin Ashby	15
2	(England) Malcolm Simmons	14
3	(England) Bob Kilby	11
4	(Scotland) Jim McMillan	10
5	(England) Gordon Kennett	10
6	(England) John Louis	10
7	(England) Doug Wyer	9
8	(England) Chris Morton	8
9	(Scotland) Bobby Beaton	6
10	(England) Frank Auffret	5
11	(Scotland) George Hunter	5
12	(England) Mike Lanham	5
13	(England) Eric Broadbelt	3
14	(England) Arthur Price	2
15	(England) Colin Gooddy	2
16	(England) Roger Johns	1

- 24 June
- (England) Owlerton Stadium, Sheffield
- Top 8 to British final

Pos.	Rider	Points
1	(England) Ray Wilson	15
2	(England) Dave Jessup	13
3	(England) Peter Collins	11
4	(England) Dave Morton	11
5	(England) Alan Wilkinson	10
6	(England) Tony Davey	9
7	(England) Carl Glover	8
8	(England) Chris Pusey	8
9	(England) Nigel Boocock	8
10	(England) Terry Betts	5
11	(England) Kevin Holden	4
12	(England) Alan Grahame	4
13	(England) Ray Bales	4
14	(England) Tom Owen	4
15	(England) Trevor Hedge	3
16	(England) Paul Tyrer	2

=== Intercontinental Final ===
- 3 June 1975
- (Sweden) Ullevi, Gothenburg
- First 8 to European Final plus 1 reserve

Placing	Rider	Total	1	2	3	4	5	6	7	8	9	10	11	12	13	14	15	16	17	18	19	20	Pts	Pos
1	(New Zealand) (2) Ivan Mauger	14	2					3				3				3				3			14	1
2	(Sweden) (11) Anders Michanek	12			2				3		3					1						3	12	2
3	(Sweden) (13) Bernt Persson	11+3				3	3							0		2					3		11	3
4	(Denmark) (1) Ole Olsen	11+2	3				1				2				2				3				11	4
5	(United States) (6) Scott Autrey	9		3				2			1							2			1		9	5
6	(Sweden) (9) Tommy Jansson	9			3		2						2					1		1			9	6
7	(Norway) (14) Reidar Eide	8+3				2		1					3		0							2	8	7
8	(Australia) (3) Phil Crump	8+2	1						2				1				2				2		8	8
9	(Sweden) (7) Tommy Johansson	8+1		1					0					2	3					2			8	9
10	(Norway) (4) Dag Lovaas	7	0							3				1				3				0	7	10
11	(Australia) (12) John Boulger	4			1					0		2			1						0		4	11
12	(Australia) (8) Billy Sanders	4		0						2			0			0			2				4	12
13	(Sweden) (16) Bengt Jansson	4				0				1	0						3			0			4	13
14	(Sweden) (5) Hasse Holmqvist	4		2			0					1					0					1	4	14
15	(United States) (10) Steven Gresham	3			0			0						3			0		F				3	15
16	(New Zealand) (15) Barry Briggs	1				1			-			-						-	-				1	16
	(Sweden) (17) Kenneth Selmonsson	0																					0	
	(Sweden) (18) Jan Andersson	2							1			0						0	1				2	
Placing	Rider	Total	1	2	3	4	5	6	7	8	9	10	11	12	13	14	15	16	17	18	19	20	Pts	Pos

m - exclusion for exceeding two minute time allowance • t - exclusion for touching the tapes • x - other exclusion • e - retired or mechanical failure • f - fell • ns - non-starter • nc - non-classify

gate A - inside	gate B	gate C	gate D - outside

=== Continental Final ===
- 22 June 1975
- (Soviet Union) Leningrad Speedway Stadium, Leningrad
- First 8 to European Final

Placing	Rider	Total	1	2	3	4	5	6	7	8	9	10	11	12	13	14	15	16	17	18	19	20	Pts	Pos
1	(Poland) (6) Edward Jancarz	12		3				1			3							2			3		12	1
2	(Soviet Union) (4) Valery Gordeev	11	3							0				2				3				3	11	2
3	(Soviet Union) (15) Viktor Kalmykov	11				3			3			3						0	2				11	3
4	(Soviet Union) (10) Vladimir Gordeev	10			3			3						1			0		3				10	4
5	(Poland) (13) Marek Cieślak	10				0	2							3		3					2		10	5
6	(Poland) (8) Henryk Glücklich	10		1						3			1			2			3				10	6
7	(Soviet Union) (2) Viktor Trofimov	10	2					2				2				1				3			10	7
8	(Poland) (1) Zenon Plech	7+3	1				1				1				3				1				7	8
9	(Soviet Union) (16) Nikolay Kornev	7+2				1				2	2						1			2			8	9
10	(Poland) (5) Piotr Bruzda	7+1		2			0					1					2					2	7	10
11	(Czechoslovakia) (9) Jiri Stancl	7+0			0		3						3					1		0			7	11
12	(Soviet Union) (12) Mikhail Starostin	6			1					2		0			2						1		6	12
13	(Czechoslovakia) (14) Jan Verner	5				2		0					2		1							0	5	13
14	(Poland) (11) Bogusław Nowak	5			2				2		0					0						1	5	14
15	(Poland) (3) Paweł Waloszek	1	0						1				0				0				0		1	15
16	(East Germany) (7) Manfred Poschenreider	1		0					0					0	0					1			1	16
	(Poland) (17) Andrzej Jurczyński	0																					0	
	(Poland) (18) Franciszek Stach	0																					0	
Placing	Rider	Total	1	2	3	4	5	6	7	8	9	10	11	12	13	14	15	16	17	18	19	20	Pts	Pos

m - exclusion for exceeding two minute time allowance • t - exclusion for touching the tapes • x - other exclusion • e - retired or mechanical failure • f - fell • ns - non-starter • nc - non-classify

gate A - inside	gate B	gate C	gate D - outside

== Fifth round ==
=== British Final ===
- 30 July 1975
- (England) Brandon Stadium, Coventry
- First 4 to World Final plus 1 reserve

Placing	Rider	Total	1	2	3	4	5	6	7	8	9	10	11	12	13	14	15	16	17	18	19	20	Pts	Pos
1	(England) (6) John Louis	15		3				3			3							3			3		15	1
2	(England) (8) Peter Collins	13+3		2						2			3			3			3				13	2
3	(England) (9) Malcolm Simmons	13+2			3		3						2					2		3			13	3
4	(England) (12) Ray Wilson	11+3			F					3		3			3						2		11	4
5	(England) (3) Martin Ashby	11+2	3						3				1				3				1		11	5
6	(England) (10) Chris Pusey	10			1			2						3			2		2				10	6
7	(England) (11) Tony Davey	9			2				2		1					1						3	9	7
8	(England) (1) Gordon Kennett	6	2				1				2				1				0				6	8
9	(England) (2) Dave Jessup	6	0					0				2				2				2			6	9
10	(England) (4) Doug Wyer	5	1							1				2				1				0	5	10
11	(Scotland) (7) Jim McMillan	5		1					1					0	2					1			5	11
12	(England) (13) Bob Kilby	5				2	2							1		0					0		5	12
13	(England) (14) Chris Morton	5				3		1					0		0							1	5	13
14	(England) (5) Dave Morton	3		0			E					1					0					2	3	14
15	(England) (16) Alan Wilkinson	2				1				0	F						1			0			2	15
16	(England) (15) Carl Glover	1				0			0			0						0	1				1	16
	(England) (17) Nigel Boocock	0																					0	
	(Scotland) (18) Bobby Beaton	0																					0	
Placing	Rider	Total	1	2	3	4	5	6	7	8	9	10	11	12	13	14	15	16	17	18	19	20	Pts	Pos

m - exclusion for exceeding two minute time allowance • t - exclusion for touching the tapes • x - other exclusion • e - retired or mechanical failure • f - fell • ns - non-starter • nc - non-classify

gate A - inside	gate B	gate C	gate D - outside

=== European Final ===
- 24 August 1975
- (Poland) Polonia Bydgoszcz Stadium, Bydgoszcz
- First 12 to World Final plus 1 reserve

Placing	Rider	Total	1	2	3	4	5	6	7	8	9	10	11	12	13	14	15	16	17	18	19	20	Pts	Pos	21
1	(New Zealand) (12) Ivan Mauger	14			3					3		3			3						2		14	1	3
2	(Denmark) (3) Ole Olsen	14	2						3				3				3				3		14	2	2
3	(Australia) (9) Phil Crump	11			2		3						1					2		3			11	3	
4	(Sweden) (6) Anders Michanek	10		3				0			3							3			1		10	4	
5	(Poland) (2) Henryk Glücklich	9	3					1				1				2				2			9	5	
6	(Sweden) (13) Tommy Jansson	8				2	1							2		3					0		8	6	
7	(Soviet Union) (14) Valery Gordeev	8				0		3					2		1							2	8	7	
8	(Soviet Union) (10) Viktor Trofimov	8			X			2						3			1		2				8	8	
9	(Sweden) (16) Bernt Persson	7				3				2	0						2			E			7	9	
10	(Poland) (1) Edward Jancarz	7	1				2				2				2				0				7	10	
11	(Poland) (7) Zenon Plech	6		2					2					1	0					1			6	11	
12	(Poland) (15) Marek Cieślak	6				1			1			2						1	1				6	12	
13	(Soviet Union) (8) Vladimir Gordeev	5		0						1			0			1			3				5	13	
14	(United States) (4) Scott Autrey	3	0							0				0				0				3	3	14	
15	(Norway) (11) Reidar Eide	3			1				0		1					0						1	3	15	
16	(Soviet Union) (5) Viktor Kalmykov	1		1			0					-					0					0	1	16	
R1	(Sweden) (R1) Tommy Johansson	0																					0	R1	
R2	(Soviet Union) (R2) Nikolay Kornev	0																					0	R2	
Placing	Rider	Total	1	2	3	4	5	6	7	8	9	10	11	12	13	14	15	16	17	18	19	20	Pts	Pos	21

m - exclusion for exceeding two minute time allowance • t - exclusion for touching the tapes • x - other exclusion • e - retired or mechanical failure • f - fell • ns - non-starter • nc - non-classify

gate A - inside	gate B	gate C	gate D - outside

== World Final ==
- 6 September 1975
- (England) Wembley Stadium, London.
- Referee: ( (Norway) ) Torrie Kittelsen

Placing	Rider	Total	1	2	3	4	5	6	7	8	9	10	11	12	13	14	15	16	17	18	19	20	Pts	Pos
1	(Denmark) (14) Ole Olsen	15				3		3					3		3							3	15	1
2	(Sweden) (16) Anders Michanek	13				1				3	3						3			3			13	2
3	(England) (10) John Louis	12+3			2			2						3			2		3				12	3
4	(New Zealand) (6) Ivan Mauger	12+2		3				1			2							3			3		12	4
5	(England) (11) Peter Collins	10			3				3		0					3						1	10	5
6	(Australia) (1) Phil Crump	10	3				3				1				1				2				10	6
7	(England) (5) Malcolm Simmons	10		2			2					3					1					2	10	7
8	(Soviet Union) (15) Viktor Trofimov	8				2			1			2						2	1				8	8
9	(Sweden) (8) Tommy Jansson	8		1						2			2			2			0				7	9
10	(Sweden) (3) Bernt Persson	5	0						2				1				0				2		5	10
11	(England) (7) Ray Wilson	5		0					0					1	2					2			5	11
12	(Poland) (2) Edward Jancarz	4	2					0				1				1				0			4	12
13	(Soviet Union) (4) Valery Gordeev	4	1							1				2				0				0	4	13
14	(Poland) (9) Zenon Plech	4			1		1						0					1		1			4	14
15	(Poland) (13) Marek Cieślak	1				0	0							0		0					1		1	15
16	(Poland) (12) Henryk Glücklich	0			0					0		0			0						0		0	16
	(England) (17) Martin Ashby	0																					0	
	(Soviet Union) (18) Vladimir Gordeev	0																					0	
Placing	Rider	Total	1	2	3	4	5	6	7	8	9	10	11	12	13	14	15	16	17	18	19	20	Pts	Pos

m - exclusion for exceeding two minute time allowance • t - exclusion for touching the tapes • x - other exclusion • e - retired or mechanical failure • f - fell • ns - non-starter • nc - non-classify

gate A - inside	gate B	gate C	gate D - outside
