= 1976 Polish speedway season =

Motorcycle racing competition

The 1976 Polish Speedway season was the 1976 season of motorcycle speedway in Poland.

== Individual ==
=== Polish Individual Speedway Championship ===
The 1976 Individual Speedway Polish Championship final was held on 22 June at Gorzów.

Pos.	Rider	Club	Total	Points
1	Zdzisław Dobrucki	Leszno	14	(3,2,3,3,3)
2	Jerzy Rembas	Gorzów Wlkp.	12	(3,3,3,d,3)
3	Edward Jancarz	Gorzów Wlkp.	11	(3,2,3,d,3)
4	Jan Mucha	Świętochłowice	8	(w,3,2,1,2)
5	Andrzej Tkocz	Rybnik	8	(2,1,1,2,2)
6	Jerzy Szczakiel	Opole	7	(1,3,w,3,0)
7	Piotr Bruzda	Wrocław	7	(w,1,1,3,2)
8	Jan Ząbik	Toruń	7	(2,w,2,2,1)
9	Marek Cieślak	Częstochowa	6	(w,0,1,3,2)
10	Bogusław Nowak	Gorzów Wlkp.	6	(d,2,1,2,1)
11	Jerzy Kowalski	Leszno	5	(2,3,0,0,0)
12	Wojciech Kaczmarek	Gniezno	5	(3,2,0,u,w)
13	Zbigniew Jąder	Leszno	5	(1,0,2,1,1)
14	Bernard Jąder	Leszno	4	(0,1,2,0,1)
15	Piotr Pyszny	Rybnik	3	(2,0,0,1,w)
16	Paweł Waloszek	Świętochłowice	1	(0,1,0,0,0)
17	Czesław Piwosz	Leszno	1	(1,0,u,–,–)
18	Mieczysław Woźniak (res)	Gorzów Wlkp.	7	(1,3,3)

=== Golden Helmet ===
The 1976 Golden Golden Helmet (Polish: Turniej o Złoty Kask, ZK) organised by the Polish Motor Union (PZM) was the 1976 event for the league's leading riders.

Calendar

Date	Venue	Winner
Quarter-Finals
2 V	Zielona Góra	Antoni Fojcik (Rybnik)
2 V	Bydgoszcz	Jerzy Rembas (Gorzów Wlkp.)
2 V	Gdańsk	Edward Jancarz (Gorzów Wlkp.)
2 V	Toruń	Henryk Glücklich (Bydgoszcz)
Semi-Finals
13 V	Rybnik	Andrzej Jurczyński (Częstochowa)
13 V	Wrocław	Edward Jancarz (Gorzów Wlkp.)
Finals
24 VI	Opole	Jan Mucha (Świętochłowice)
1 VII	Leszno	Jerzy Rembas (Gorzów Wlkp.)
15 VII	Gorzów Wlkp.	Marek Cieślak (Częstochowa)
29 VII	Częstochowa	Marek Cieślak (Częstochowa)

Final classification

Pos.	Rider	Club	Total	OPO	LES	GOR	CZE
1	Marek Cieślak	Włókniarz Częstochowa	54	12	12	15	15
2	Edward Jancarz	Stal Gorzów Wlkp.	49	13	13	11	12
3	Jerzy Rembas	Stal Gorzów Wlkp.	42	5	14	13	10
4	Jan Mucha	Śląsk Świętochłowice	39	13	7	11	8
5	Zygmunt Studziński	Motor Lublin	29	5	6	7	11
6	Jerzy Kowalski	Unia Leszno	29	9	13	6	1
7	Piotr Bruzda	Sparta Wrocław	27	8	9	6	4
8	Mieczysław Woźniak	Stal Gorzów Wlkp.	26	8	-	10	8
9	Jerzy Szczakiel	Kolejarz Opole	24	10	8	6	-
10	Bernard Jąder	Unia Leszno	23	3	7	7	6
11	Andrzej Jurczyński	Włókniarz Częstochowa	20	-	-	8	12
12	Zbigniew Jąder	Unia Leszno	16	-	8	4	4
13	Czesław Piwosz	Unia Leszno	13	-	6	1	6
14	Zbigniew Filipiak	Falubaz Zielona Góra	11	8	3	-	-
15	Paweł Waloszek	Śląsk Świętochłowice	11	9	2	-	-
16	Czesław Goszczyński	Włókniarz Częstochowa	9	1	3	-	5
17	Zenon Urbaniec	Włókniarz Częstochowa	9	-	-	-	9
18	Henryk Glücklich	Polonia Bydgoszcz	8	8	-	-	-
19	Leszek Marsz	Wybrzeże Gdańsk	8	3	5	-	-
20	Daniel Chmielewski	Włókniarz Częstochowa	5	-	-	-	5
21	Jerzy Padewski	Stal Gorzów Wlkp.	5	-	-	5	-
22	Ryszard Fabiszewski	Stal Gorzów Wlkp.	5	-	-	5	-
23	Marian Michaliszyn	Polonia Bydgoszcz	5	1	4	-	-
24	Bogusław Nowak	Stal Gorzów Wlkp.	4	-	-	4	-
25	Zygfryd Kostka	Sparta Wrocław	4	-	-	-	4

=== Junior Championship ===
- winner - Wiesław Patynek

=== Silver Helmet ===
- winner - Mariusz Okoniewski

=== Bronze Helmet ===
- winner - Alfred Siekierka

== Pairs ==
=== Polish Pairs Speedway Championship ===
The 1976 Polish Pairs Speedway Championship was the 1976 edition of the Polish Pairs Speedway Championship. The final was held on 22 August at Gdańsk.

Pos	Team	Pts	Riders
1	Stal Gorzów Wlkp.	29	Jerzy Rembas 15, Edward Jancarz 14
2	Sparta Wrocław	22	Robert Słaboń 10, Ryszard Jany 12
3	Włókniarz Częstochowa	22	Andrzej Jurczyński 7, Marek Cieślak 15
4	ROW Rybnik	15	Piotr Pyszny 5, Andrzej Tkocz 10
5	Wybrzeże Gdańsk	15	Henryk Żyto 8, Leszek Marsz 7
6	Śląsk Świętochłowice	13	Jan Mucha 11, Jerzy Kochman 2
7	Stal Toruń	10	Janusz Plewiński 10, Jerzy Kniaź 0

== Team ==
=== Team Speedway Polish Championship ===
The 1976 Team Speedway Polish Championship was the 1976 edition of the Team Polish Championship.

Stal Gorzów Wielkopolski won the gold medal for the second successive year. The team included Edward Jancarz, Zenon Plech, Bogusław Nowak, Ryszard Fabiszewski and Jerzy Rembas.

=== First League ===
Pos	Club	Pts	W	D	L	+/−
1	Stal Gorzów Wielkopolski	29	14	1	3	+231
2	Włókniarz Częstochowa	25	12	1	5	+205
3	Unia Leszno	17	8	1	9	+1
4	Kolejarz Opole	17	8	1	9	–29
5	Polonia Bydgoszcz	16	8	0	10	+59
6	Sparta Wrocław	16	7	2	9	+38
7	ROW Rybnik	16	8	0	10	–104
8	Stal Toruń	16	8	0	10	–143
9	Wybrzeże Gdańsk	14	7	0	11	–70
10	Falubaz Zielona Góra	14	7	0	11	–188

=== Second League ===
Pos	Club	Pts	W	D	L	+/−
1	Motor Lublin	36	18	0	2	+512
2	Śląsk Świętochłowice	30	15	0	5	+383
3	Unia Tarnów	18	9	0	11	–112
4	Gwardia Łódź	18	9	0	11	–138
5	Start Gniezno	14	7	0	13	–190
6	Stal Rzeszów	4	2	0	18	–455
