= 1977 Speedway World Team Cup =

18th edition of the annual motorcycle speedway World Cup competition

Seasons
- ← 1976 1978 →

The 1977 Speedway World Team Cup was the 18th edition of the FIM Speedway World Team Cup to determine the team world champions.

The final took place at the Stadion Olimpijski (Wrocław) in Poland. England bounced back to winning ways by recording a record seventh title success. England exacted revenge on defending champions Australia by knocking them out in the British qualifying round.

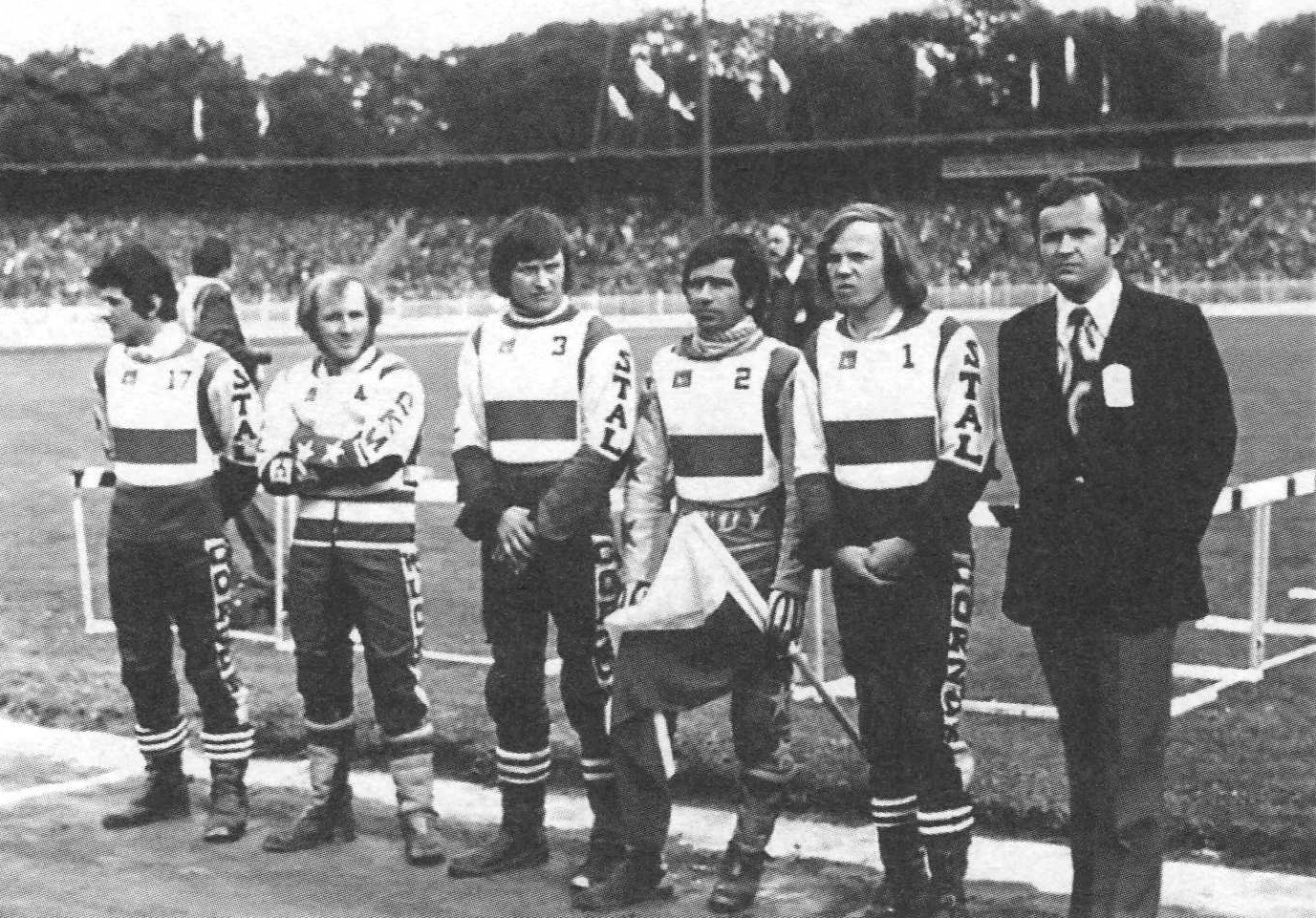
Silver medal winners Poland: Ryszard Fabiszewski, Marek Cieślak, Bogusław Nowak, Edward Jancarz, Jerzy Rembas

== Qualification ==
=== British & Commonwealth Round ===
- 19 June
- (England) Smallmead Stadium, Reading
- Referee: (Sweden) C Bergstrom

Placing	Team / Rider name	Total	1	2	3	4	5	6	7	8	9	10	11	12	13	14	15	16	Pts	17	18	19	20
1	England	42	3	6	8	10	13	16	17	20	23	24	27	30	33	36	39	42		42	42	42	42
1	(5) Dave Jessup	12	3					3					3					3	12
1	(6) Malcolm Simmons	12		3			3							3			3		12
1	(7) John Davis	6				2			1			-				3			6
1	(8) Peter Collins	11			2					3	3				3				11
1	(18) Michael Lee	1										1							1
2	Australia	33	2	4	7	8	10	12	15	16	18	21	23	25	27	29	31	33		33	33	33	33
2	(1) John Boulger	6				1				1				2				2	6
2	(2) Phil Crump	10			3				3				2				2		10
2	(3) Billy Sanders	9		2				2				3			2				9
2	(4) Phil Herne	8	2				2				2					2			8
2	(17) Mitch Shirra	0																	0
3	Scotland	13	0	1	1	1	1	1	3	5	6	8	9	10	11	12	12	13		13	13	13	13
3	(13) Jim McMillan	5		1					2		1							1	5
3	(14) Bobby Beaton	4	E							2		2					0		4
3	(15) Brian Collins	2			0			X						1		1			2
3	(16) Bert Harkins	2				0	0						1		1				2
3	(20) Benny Rourke	0																	0
4	New Zealand	8	1	1	2	5	6	7	7	7	7	7	7	7	7	7	8	8		8	8	8	8
4	(9) Larry Ross	2			1		1					0						0	2
4	(10) Bruce Cribb	5				3		1			0						1		5
4	(11) Robin Adlington	0		0						0			0			0			0
4	(12) Dave Gifford	1	1						-					0	-				1
4	(19) John Goodall	0																	0
Placing	Team / Rider name	Total	1	2	3	4	5	6	7	8	9	10	11	12	13	14	15	16	Pts	17	18	19	20

M - exclusion for exceeding two-minute time allowance • T - exclusion for touching the tapes • X - other exclusion • E - retired or mechanical failure • F - fell

Helmet colours were permanent for each team (Red, Blue, White and Yellow/Black). Colours in diagrams indicate gate positions:
gate A – inside	gate B	gate C	gate D – outside

- England to Final

=== Scandinavian Round ===
- 19 June
- (Norway) Geiteryggen Speedwaybane, Skien

1st	2nd	3rd	4th
Sweden - 37; Bernt Persson - 11; Tommy Nilsson - 10; Bengt Jansson - 9 Anders Michanek - 5 Jan Andersson - 2	Denmark - 28; Ole Olsen - 12; Mike Lohmann - 7 Alf Busk - 5 Finn Jensen - 3 Bo Petersen - 1	Finland - 25; Kai Niemi - 8 Ila Teromaa - 8 Rauli Makinen - 5 Markku Helminen - 4	Norway - 5 Tom Godal - 2 Audun Ove Olsen - 2 Jan Terje Gravningen - 1 Tormod Langli - 0

- Sweden to Final

=== Continental Round ===
QuarterFinal

- 21 May
- (West Germany) Ellermühle Stadium, Landshut

1st	2nd	3rd	4th
West Germany - 42; Egon Müller - 12; Christoph Betzl - 11; Hans Wassermann - 9 Alois Wiesböck - 7 Georg Gilgenreiner - 3	Netherlands - 24; Frits Koppe - 8 Henny Kroeze - 8 Henk Steman - 4 Frits Koning - 3 Rudi Muts - 1	Austria - 19; Hubert Fischbacher - 6 Walter Grubmuler - 5 Adi Funk - 4 Gunther Walla - 4	Hungary - 11; Janos Berki - 5 Herbert Szerecs - 5 Laszlo Meszaros - 1 Janos Szoeke - 0

- West Germany and Nederlands to Continental Semifinal

QuarterFinal

- 22 May
- (Socialist Federal Republic of Yugoslavia) City Garden Stadium, Osijek

1st	2nd	3rd	4th
Czechoslovakia - 41; Jan Verner - 12; Ivon Vobornik - 9 Aleš Dryml Sr. - 7 Josef Minarik - 7 Jan Klokocka - 6	Bulgaria - 28; Orlin Janakiev - 8 Grigory Adarov - 7 Angel Eftimov - 7 Nikolai Manev - 6	Italy - 25; Luigi Biginato - 7 Paolo Noro - 7 Francesko Barbetta - 6 Fabio Pastorelli - 5	Yugoslavia - 2 Stefan Kecek - 1 Vlado Kocuvan - 1 Djuro Fleten - 0 ? Goniniak - 0

- Czechoslovakia and Bulgaria to Continental Semifinal

SemiFinal

- 22 May
- (Hungary) Borsod Volán Stadion, Miskolc

1st	2nd	3rd	4th
Czechoslovakia - 40; Jiří Štancl - 11; Jan Verner - 11; Aleš Dryml Sr. - 9 Josef Minarik - 7 Jan Hadek - 2	West Germany - 33; Christoph Betzl - 11; Hans Wassermann - 10; Alois Wiesböck - 9 Georg Gilgenreiner - 3	Netherlands - 18; Frits Koppe - 5 Frits Koning - 4 Henk Steman - 4 Rudi Muts - 3 Henny Kroeze - 2	Bulgaria - 5 Nikolai Manev - 2 Ivan Dupalov - 1 Angel Eftimov - 1 Orlin Janakiev - 1

- Czechoslovakia and West Germany to Continental Final

Final

- 9 July
- (Czechoslovakia) Marketa Stadium, Prague
- Att: 12,000

Placing	Team / Rider name	Total	1	2	3	4	5	6	7	8	9	10	11	12	13	14	15	16	Pts	17	18	19	20
1	Czechoslovakia	32	2	3	6	8	8	10	13	15	18	20	22	23	25	28	31	32		32	32	32	32
1	(9) Jiří Štancl	6			3		0					2						1	6
1	(10) Václav Verner	10				2		2			3						3		10
1	(11) Jan Verner	8		1						2			2			3			8
1	(12) Aleš Dryml Sr.	8	2						3					1	2				8
1	(19) Jan Hadek	0																	0
2	Poland	30	3	5	7	7	9	10	12	13	15	16	19	22	23	25	27	30		30	30	30	30
2	(5) Zenon Plech	10	3					1					3					3	10
2	(6) Edward Jancarz	9		2			2							3			2		9
2	(7) Jan Mucha	0				0			-			-				-			0
2	(8) Jerzy Rembas	6			2					1	2				1				6
2	(18) Bogusław Nowak	5							2			1				2			5
3	West Germany	28	0	3	3	6	9	12	12	15	16	19	19	21	24	25	26	28		28	28	28	28
3	(1) Egon Müller	10				3				3				2				2	10
3	(2) Christoph Betzl	0			0				0				0				-		0
3	(3) Hans Wassermann	12		3				3				3			3				12
3	(4) Alois Wiesböck	2	0				-				1					1			2
3	(17) Georg Gilgenreiner	4					3										1		4
4	Soviet Union	6	1	1	2	3	4	4	5	5	5	5	6	6	6	6	6	6		6	6	6	6
4	(13) Sergey Dyuzhev	1		0					1		0							-	1
4	(14) Grigory Khlinovsky	1	1							0		0					0		1
4	(15) Vladimir Paznikov	1			1			0						0		0			1
4	(16) Vladimir Rozhanchuk	3				1	1						1		0				3
4	(20) Nikolay Kornev	0																0	0
Placing	Team / Rider name	Total	1	2	3	4	5	6	7	8	9	10	11	12	13	14	15	16	Pts	17	18	19	20

M - exclusion for exceeding two-minute time allowance • T - exclusion for touching the tapes • X - other exclusion • E - retired or mechanical failure • F - fell

Helmet colours were permanent for each team (Red, Blue, White and Yellow/Black). Colours in diagrams indicate gate positions:
gate A – inside	gate B	gate C	gate D – outside

- Czechoslovakia and Poland to Final

== World Final ==
- 18 September
- (Poland) Olympic Stadium, Wrocław
- Att: 55,000

Placing	Team / Rider name	Total	1	2	3	4	5	6	7	8	9	10	11	12	13	14	15	16	Pts	17	18	19	20
1	England	37	1	4	6	8	11	12	14	16	19	22	23	26	29	32	35	37		37	37	37	37
1	(13) Peter Collins	10		3					2		3							2	10
1	(14) Malcolm Simmons	3	1							2		-					-		3
1	(15) Michael Lee	9			2			1						3		3			9
1	(16) Dave Jessup	9				2	3						1		3				9
1	(20) John Davis	6										3					3		6
2	Poland	25	0	1	4	7	9	11	14	17	17	19	21	21	22	23	25	25		25	25	25	25
2	(1) Jerzy Rembas	6				3				3				0				E	6
2	(2) Edward Jancarz	10			3				3				2				2		10
2	(3) Bogusław Nowak	6		1				2				2			1				6
2	(4) Marek Cieslak	2	0				2				0					-			2
2	(17) Ryszard Fabiszewski	1														1			1
3	Czechoslovakia	23	2	4	4	5	6	6	7	8	10	11	14	16	18	20	20	23		23	23	23	23
3	(5) Jiří Štancl	8	2					0					3					3	8
3	(6) Václav Verner	5		2			1							2			0		5
3	(7) Jan Verner	5				1			1			1				2			5
3	(8) Aleš Dryml Sr.	5			0					1	2				2				5
3	(18) Petr Ondrašík	0																	0
4	Sweden	11	3	3	4	4	4	7	7	7	8	8	8	9	9	9	10	11		11	11	11	11
4	(9) Bengt Jansson	2			1		0					0						1	2
4	(10) Anders Michanek	5				0		3			1						1		5
4	(11) Tommy Nilsson	0		0						-			-			E			0
4	(12) Bernt Persson	4	3						0					1	0				4
4	(19) Sören Karlsson	0								0			0						0
Placing	Team / Rider name	Total	1	2	3	4	5	6	7	8	9	10	11	12	13	14	15	16	Pts	17	18	19	20

M - exclusion for exceeding two-minute time allowance • T - exclusion for touching the tapes • X - other exclusion • E - retired or mechanical failure • F - fell

Helmet colours were permanent for each team (Red, Blue, White and Yellow/Black). Colours in diagrams indicate gate positions:
gate A – inside	gate B	gate C	gate D – outside

== See also ==
- 1977 Individual Speedway World Championship
- 1977 Speedway World Pairs Championship
