= Marek Cieślak =

Polish motorcycle speedway rider and coach

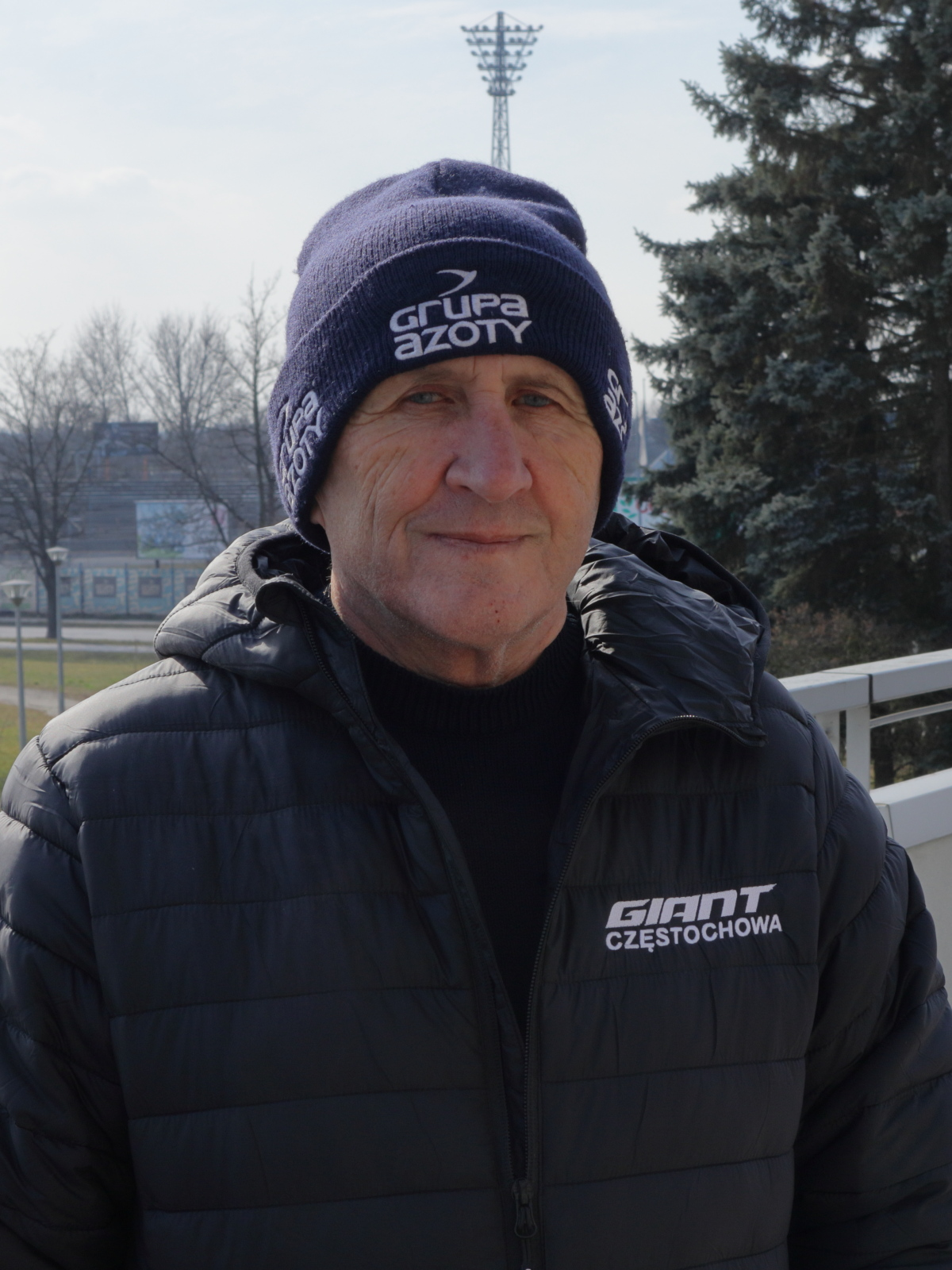
- Cieślak in 2007
- Born: 28 June 1950 (age 76); Milanówek, Poland
- Nationality: Polish

Current club information
- Career status: Coach
- Coach: ŻKS ROW Rybnik
- Manager: Poland team manager (2007–2020)

Career history

Poland
- 1968–1986: Częstochowa

Great Britain
- 1977–1978: White City

Individual honours
- 1976: Golden Helmet Winner

Team honours
- 1974: Polish League Champion
- 1977: British League Champion

Marek Kazimierz Cieślak (born 28 June 1950) is a former speedway rider and current coach. He earned 29 international caps for the Poland national speedway team.

== Career ==
Cieślak rode two seasons in the British leagues after joining White City Rebels for the 1977 British League season.

Cieślak won a second consecutive silver medal at the Speedway World Team Cup in the 1977 Speedway World Team Cup.

In 2007, Cieślak was a manager of Poland national team. Poland won Speedway World Cup and Team U-21 World Championship. After victory in SWC, on 30 July 2007 Polish president Lech Kaczyński honoured him Knight's Cross of Order of Polonia Restituta for prominent contributions for development of Polish speedway sport and for achievement in training work. In 2010, Cieślak was awarded the Officer's Cross of the Polonia Restituta for outstanding contribution to the development of speedway in Poland, for achievements in training and coaching.

== World Final appearances ==
=== Individual World Championship ===
- 1975 – (England) London, Wembley Stadium – 15th – 1 pt
- 1976 – (Poland) Chorzów, Silesian Stadium – 13th – 4 pts
- 1978 – (England) London, Wembley Stadium – 13th – 5 pts

=== World Team Cup ===
- 1972 – (West Germany) Olching, Olching Speedwaybahn (with Zenon Plech / Paweł Waloszek / Henryk Glücklich / Zdzisław Dobrucki) – 3rd – 21pts (0)
- 1975 – (West Germany) Norden, Motodrom Halbemond (with Henryk Glücklich / Edward Jancarz / Zenon Plech / Jerzy Rembas) – 4th – 9pt (4)
- 1976 – (England) London, White City Stadium (with Edward Jancarz / Zenon Plech / Jerzy Rembas / Bolesław Proch) – 2nd – 28pts (7)
- 1977 – (Poland) Wrocław, Olympic Stadium (with Jerzy Rembas / Edward Jancarz / Bogusław Nowak / Ryszard Fabiszewski) – 2nd – 25pts (2)
- 1978 – (West Germany) Landshut, Ellermühle Stadium (with Edward Jancarz / Zenon Plech / Jerzy Rembas / Andrzej Huszcza) – 3rd – 16+3pts (5)
- 1979 – (England) London, Wembley Stadium (with Zenon Plech / Piotr Pyszny / Robert Słaboń / Andrzej Tkocz) – 4th – 11pts (1)

== Manjor results ==
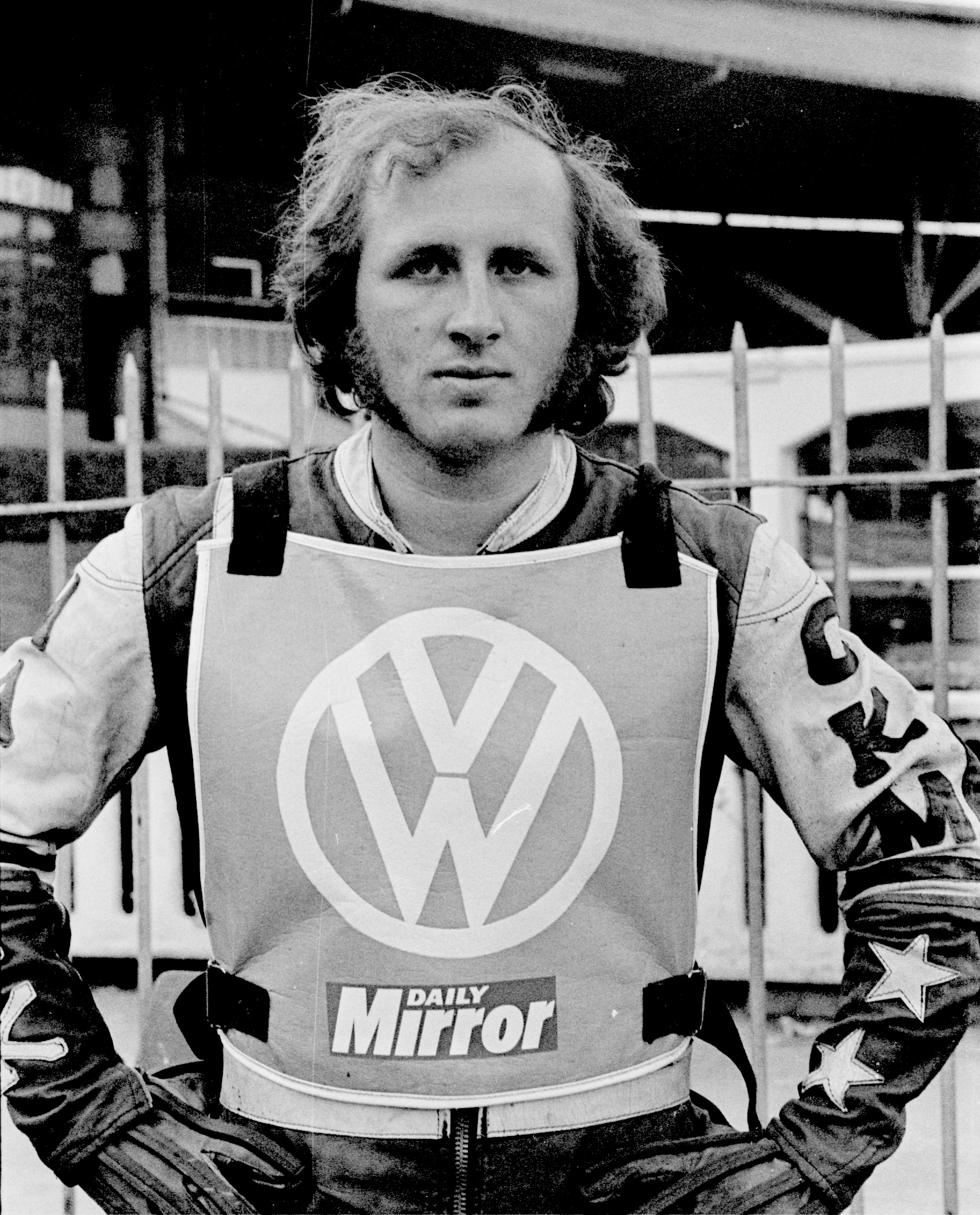
Cieślak in 1976

=== Individual Polish Championship ===
- 1971 – 14th place
- 1972 – 6th place
- 1975 – Silver medal
- 1976 – 10th place
- 1979 – 16th place

=== Polish Pairs Championship ===
- 1976 – Bronze medal
- 1978 – 4th place

=== Polish League Championship ===
- 1974 – Polish Champion
- 1975 – Silver medal

=== Poland Golden Helmet ===
- 1972 – 3rd place (72 points)
- 1973 – 7th place (53 points)
- 1975 – 5th place (59 points)
- 1976 – Winner (54 points)

=== Poland Silver Helmet (U-21) ===
- 1969 – 2nd place
- 1972 – 3rd place

== See also ==
- Poland national speedway team
