= Edward Jancarz =

Polish speedway rider (1946–1992)

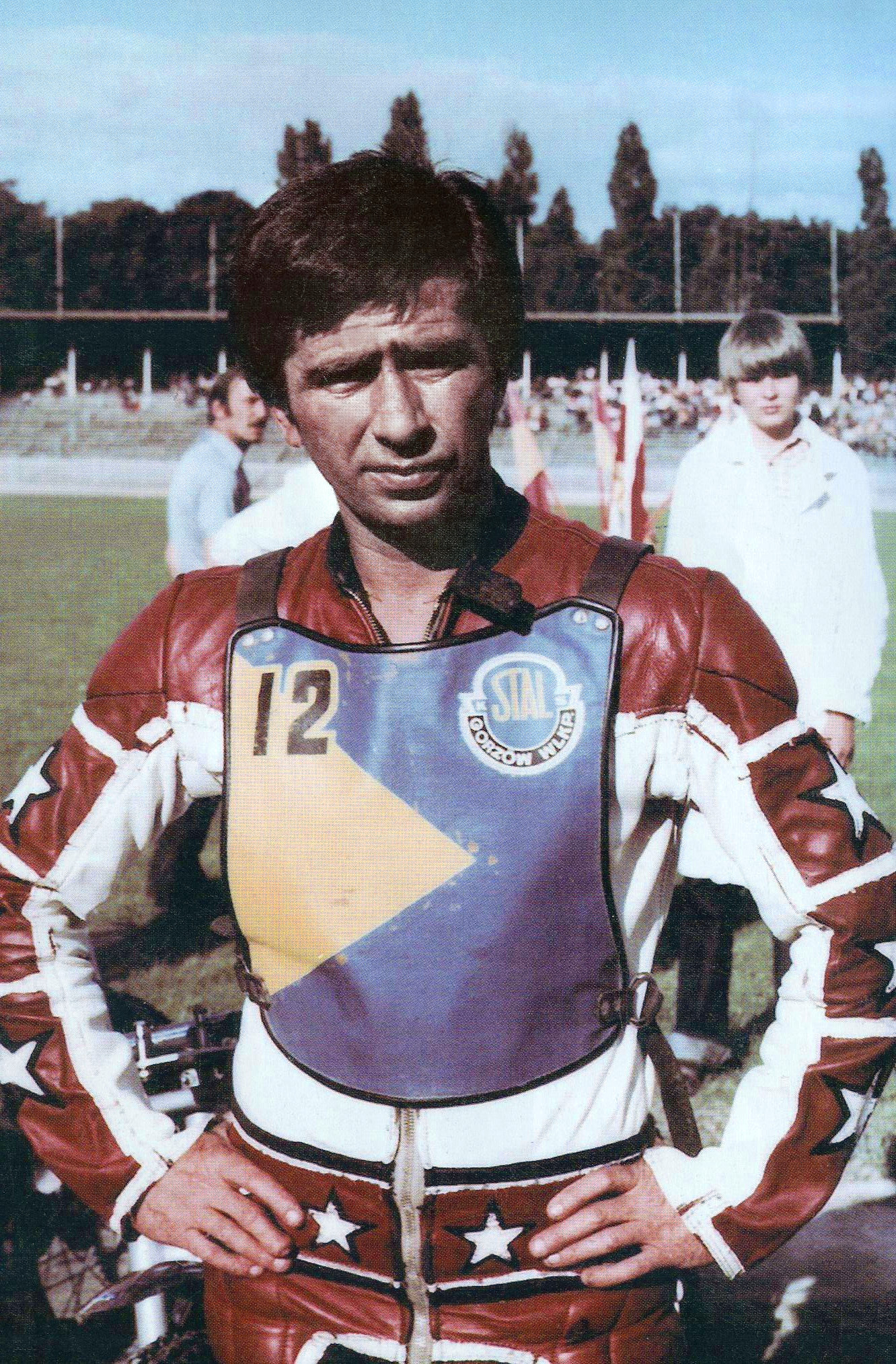
- Born: 20 August 1946; Gorzów Wielkopolski, Poland
- Died: 11 January 1992 (aged 45)
- Nationality: Polish

Career history

Poland
- 1965–1985: Gorzów

Great Britain
- 1977–1982: Wimbledon

Individual honours
- 1968: World individual championship bronze
- 1975, 1983: Polish Champion
- 1975: Continental Final Champion
- 1977: Internationale
- 1969, 1972, 1975: Poland Golden Helmet Winner
- 1967: Poland Silver Helmet Winner

Team honours
- 1969: World Team Cup winner
- 1969, 1973, 1975, 1976, 1977, 1978, 1983: Polish League Champion
- 1979: Gauntlet Gold Cup

Edward 'Ed' Jancarz (20 August 1946 – 11 January 1992) was a Polish international speedway rider. He earned 76 international caps for the Poland speedway team.

== Career ==
Jancarz participated in ten Speedway World Championship finals, his highest placing being in his first final in 1968, when he finished on the rostrum in third place after a run-off with Russian rider Gennady Kurilenko. He was also a member of the Polish World Team Cup winning team of 1969.

Jancarz reached the final of the Speedway World Pairs Championship in the 1975 Speedway World Pairs Championship at the Olympic Stadium in Wrocław, winning a silver medal riding with Piotr Bruzda.

Jancarz rode in the UK for the Wimbledon Dons between 1977–1982, winning the Internationale at Wimbledon in his first season, and in Poland for Stal Gorzów. He won the prestigious Embassy Internationale, at Wimbledon in 1977.

After his riding career ended, Jancarz was a speedway coach. He was trainer in Stal Gorzów, KKŻ Krosno and Poland national speedway team.

== Death ==
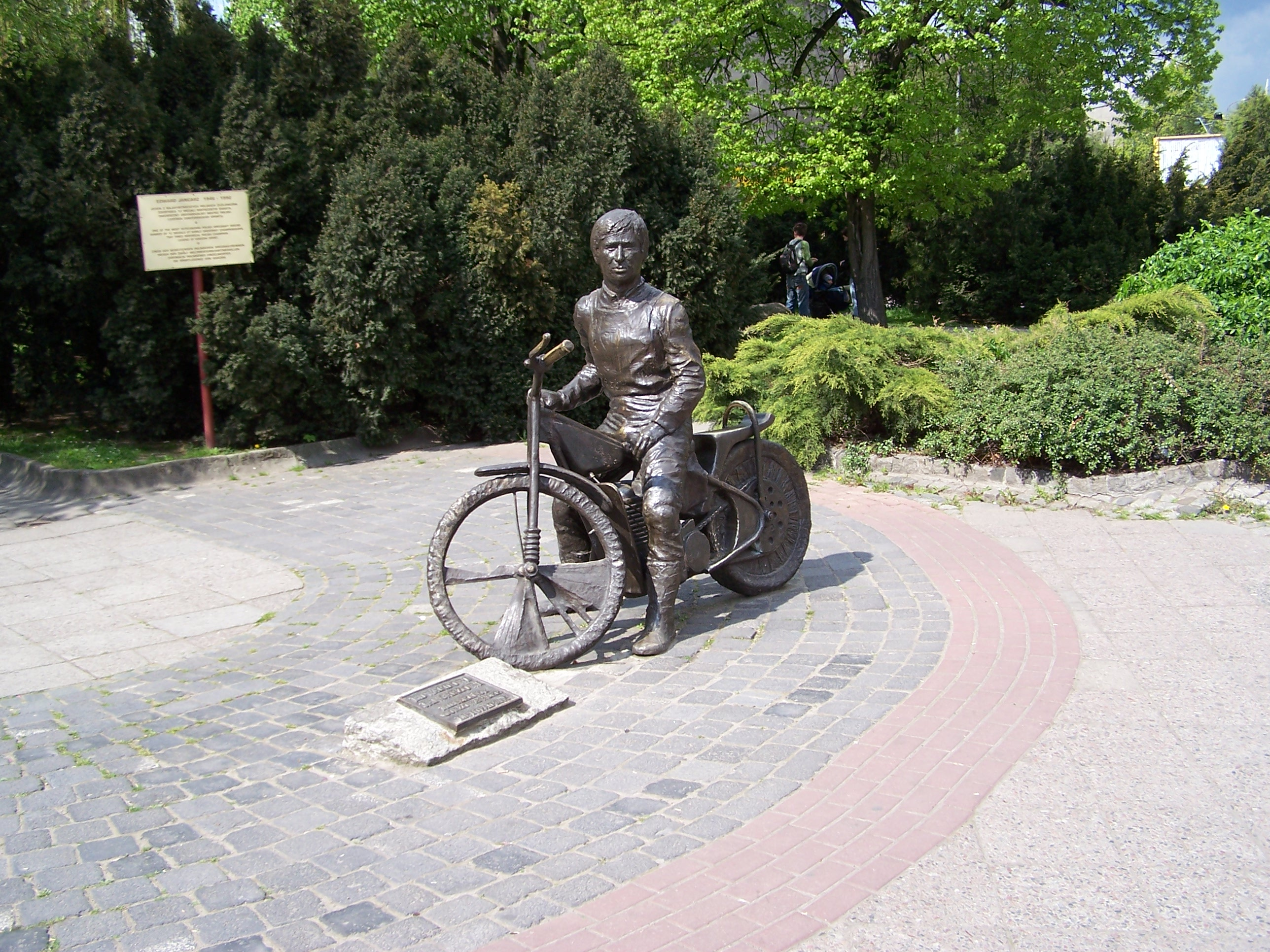
Jancarz Monument

On 11 January 1992, Jancarz was fatally stabbed by his second wife, Katarzyna, during a domestic dispute after she confronted him about his alcoholism. He was 45 years old.

Since his death, the Edward Jancarz Memorial has been a semi-annual meeting at the speedway that carries his name, the Edward Jancarz Stadium in Gorzów Wielkopolski. To date, 2010 World Champion Tomasz Gollob is the only Polish rider to win the memorial, having done so in 1998 and 1999

Jancarz was the first speedway rider in the World to have a monument dedicated to them. The Monument of Edward Jancarz was built in 2005 and is in the city centre of Gorzów Wielkopolski.

== World Final appearances ==
=== Individual World Championship ===
- 1968 – (Sweden) Gothenburg, Ullevi - 3rd - 11pts + 3pts
- 1969 – (England) London, Wembley Stadium - 6th - 9pts
- 1973 – (Poland) Chorzów, Silesian Stadium - 11th - 6pts
- 1974 – (Sweden) Gothenburg, Ullevi - Reserve - 1pt
- 1975 – (England) London, Wembley Stadium - 12th - 4pts
- 1976 – (Poland) Chorzów, Silesian Stadium - 12th - 5pts
- 1977 – (Sweden) Gothenburg, Ullevi - 13th - 4pts
- 1979 – (Poland) Chorzów, Silesian Stadium - 9th - 7pts
- 1981 – (England) London, Wembley Stadium - 12th - 5pts
- 1982 – (United States) Los Angeles, Memorial Coliseum - 10th - 7pts

=== World Pairs Championship ===
- 1974 – (England) Manchester, Hyde Road (with Zenon Plech) - 5th - 18pts (6)
- 1975 – (Poland) Wrocław, Olympic Stadium (with Piotr Bruzda) - 2nd - 23pts (15)
- 1976 – (Sweden) Eskilstuna, Snälltorpet (with Zenon Plech) - 7th - 10pts (7)
- 1978 – (Poland) Chorzów, Silesian Stadium (with Bolesław Proch) - 5th - 15pts (13)
- 1979 – (Denmark) Vojens, Speedway Center (with Zenon Plech) - 3rd - 20pts (13)
- 1980 – (Socialist Federal Republic of Yugoslavia) Krško, Matija Gubec Stadium (with Zenon Plech) - 2nd - 22pts (15)
- 1981 – (Poland) Chorzów, Silesian Stadium (with Zenon Plech) - 3rd - 21pts (6)

=== World Team Cup ===
- 1968 – (England) London, Wembley Stadium (with Edmund Migoś / Paweł Waloszek / Andrzej Wyglenda / Henryk Glücklich) - 3rd - 19pts (6)
- 1969 – (Poland) Rybnik, Rybnik Municipal Stadium (with Andrzej Wyglenda / Stanisław Tkocz / Henryk Glucklich / Andrzej Pogorzelski) - Winner - 31pts (11)
- 1971 – (Poland) Wrocław, Olympic Stadium (with Paweł Waloszek / Henryk Glücklich / Antoni Woryna / Andrzej Wyglenda) - 3rd - 19pts (4)
- 1973 – (England) London, Wembley Stadium (with Paweł Waloszek / Zenon Plech / Jerzy Szczakiel) - 4th - 8pts (2)
- 1975 – (West Germany) Norden, Motodrom Halbemond (with Henryk Glucklich / Zenon Plech / Marek Cieślak / Jerzy Rembas) - 4th - 9pts (1)
- 1976 – (England) London, White City Stadium (with Zenon Plech / Marek Cieślak]/ Jerzy Rembas / Bolesław Proch) - 2nd - 28pts (9)
- 1977 – (Poland) Wrocław, Olympic Stadium (with Jerzy Rembas / Bogusław Nowak / Marek Cieślak / Ryszard Fabiszewski) - 2nd - 25pts (10)
- 1978 – (West Germany) Landshut, Ellermühle Stadium (with Zenon Plech / Marek Cieślak / Jerzy Rembas / Andrzej Huszcza) - 3rd - 16+3pts (6+3)
- 1980 – (Poland) Wrocław, Olympic Stadium (with Zenon Plech / Roman Jankowski / Andrzej Huszcza / Jerzy Rembas) - 3rd - 15pt (3)
