= Alan Wilkinson (speedway rider) =

British speedway rider (1949–2020)

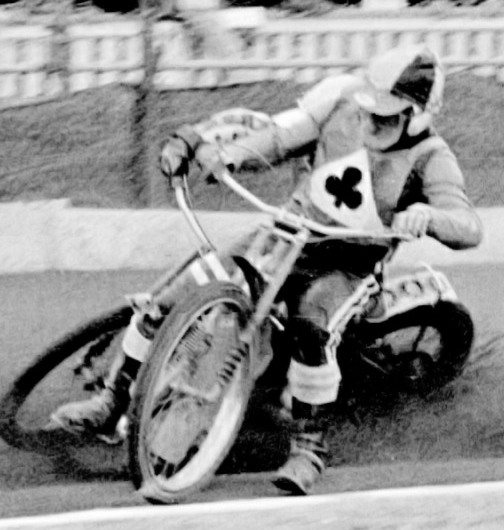
- Born: 3 May 1949; Penrith, Cumbria, England
- Died: 24 July 2020 (aged 71)

Career history
- 1970-1971: Rochdale Hornets
- 1971-1978: Belle Vue Aces

Individual honours
- 1975, 1977: British Championship finalist

Team honours
- 1971, 1972: British League Champion
- 1972, 1973, 1975: British League KO Cup Winner
- 1975, 1976, 1977, 1978: Northern Trophy

John Alan Wilkinson (3 May 1949 – 24 July 2020) was a motorcycle speedway rider from England. He earned 12 international caps for the England national speedway team.

== Speedway career ==
Wilkinson rode in the top tier of British Speedway from 1970 to 1978, riding for various clubs.

Wilkinson began his league career with Rochdale Hornets during the 1970 British League Division Two season, going on to captain the team before claiming a full time place in the Belle Vue Aces team.

Wilkinson reached the final of the British Speedway Championship on two occasions in 1975 and 1977.

During 1978, Wilkinson was paralysed when crashing into the wooden boards that surrounded the track, while riding for Belle Vue Aces.
