= Markku Helminen =

Finnish speedway rider

- Born: 16 October 1946; Lahti, Finland
- Died: March 2016
- Nationality: Finnish

Career history

Finland
- 197?-1976: Salpausselan

Great Britain
- 1977: Wolverhampton Wolves
- 1977: Leicester Lions

Iiro Markku Verner Helminen (16 October 1946 – March 2016), better known simply as Markku Helminen, was a Finnish former motorcycle speedway rider. He earned three caps for the Finland national speedway team.

== Career ==
Born in Lahti, Helminen began his career in the early 1970s in Finland with the Salpausselan team, and also represented Finland in international competition.

In 1977, Helminen signed for British League team Wolverhampton Wolves and then Leicester Lions. He rode in 22 matches for the Lions, averaging just over three points per match, before being released. He rode in one match for Wolverhampton Wolves the same year.
