= Rudy Muts =

Dutch speedway rider

- Born: 10 April 1956 (age 70); Hilversum, Netherlands
- Nationality: Dutch

Career history

Great Britain
- 1977–1981: Wimbledon Dons

Individual honours
- 1979: Dutch champion

Team honours
- 1979: Gauntlet Gold Cup

Frederik Rudolph Muts (born 10 April 1956) is a former motorcycle speedway rider from the Netherlands. He earned 18 caps for the Netherlands national speedway team.

== Career ==
Muts came to prominence after reaching the final of the Speedway Under-21 World Championship in 1977.

Muts made his British leagues debut in 1977, when he joined Wimbledon Dons for the 1977 British League season.

In 1978, Muts continued to ride for Wimbledon and improved his average considerably. The following season in 1979, he spent another season with the London club during the 1979 British League season and became the champion of the Netherlands, when winning the national individual title. He had two more seasons with Wimbledon (1980 and 1981) but his average dropped off. He was due to return for Swindon Robins for the 1983 season but this did not materialise.

Muts represented the Netherlands national team for six editions of the World Cup from 1977 to 1982. He also rode for the Netherlands in the Speedway World Pairs Championship.
