= Jerzy Rembas =

Polish speedway rider (born 1956)

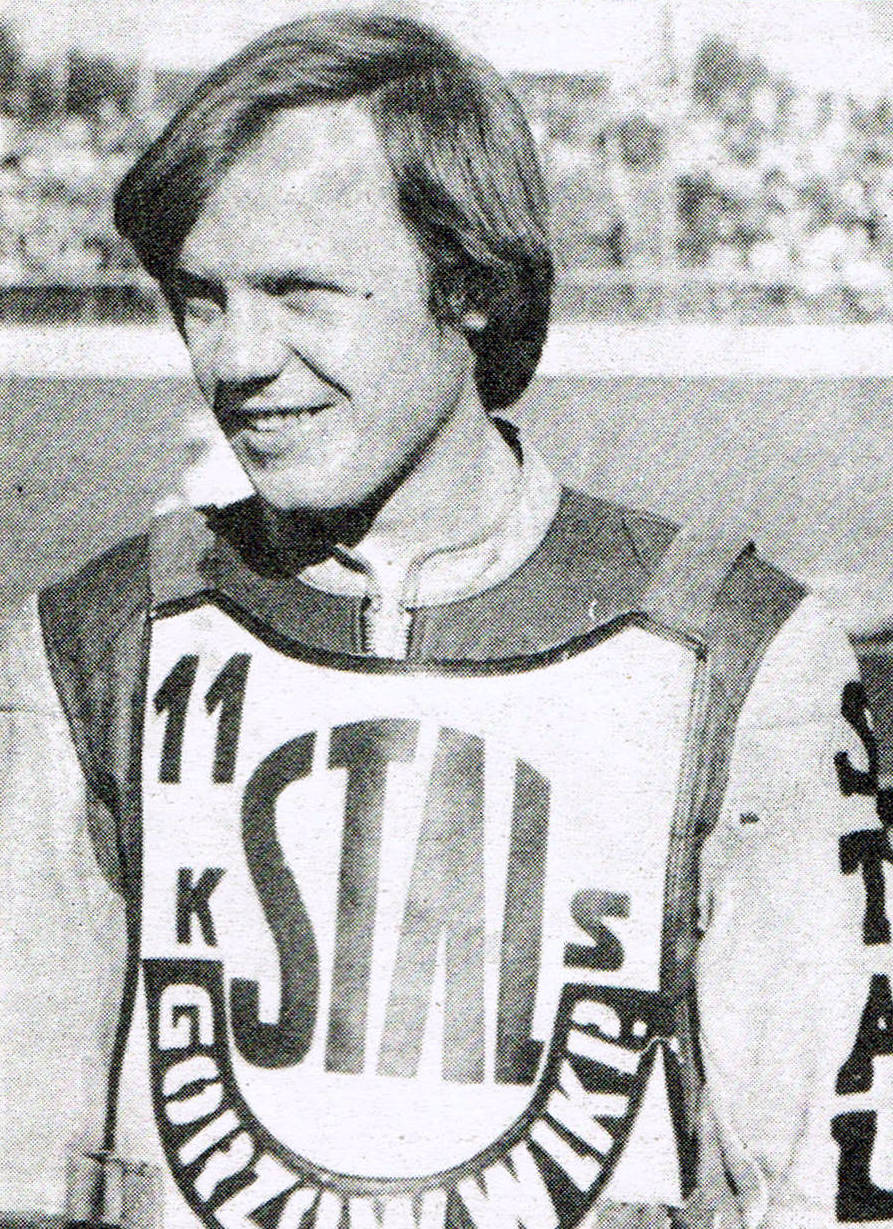
- Born: 18 April 1956 (age 70); Gorzów Wielkopolski, Poland
- Nationality: Polish

Career history

Poland
- 1972–1989: Stal Gorzów

Great Britain
- 1978: Leicester Lions
- 1981: Wimbledon Dons

Individual honours
- 1974: Polish Junior Champion
- 1977: Poland Golden Helmet Winner

Team honours
- 1973, 1975, 1976, 1977, 1978, 1983: Polish League Champion

Jerzy Rembas (born 18 April 1956 in Gorzów Wielkopolski, Poland) is a former international motorcycle speedway rider from Poland. He earned 40 international caps for the Poland national speedway team.

== Career ==
Rembas appeared in the Speedway World Championship finals twice, missing out on a rostrum place after finishing third in the third-place run-off to Scott Autrey and Dave Jessup.

Rembas rode for Stal Gorzów in Poland from 1971 until his retirement in 1990. He rode for Leicester Lions in the British League in 1978 and Wimbledon Dons in 1981.

== World Final appearances ==
=== Individual World Championship ===
- 1976 – (Poland) Chorzów, Silesian Stadium – 14th – 3pts
- 1978 – (England) London, Wembley Stadium – 5th – 11pts + 1pt

=== World Team Cup ===
- 1975 – (West Germany) Norden, Motodrom Halbemond (with Henryk Glücklich / Zenon Plech / Edward Jancarz / Marek Cieślak ) – 4th – 9pt (2)
- 1976 – (England) London, White City Stadium (with Edward Jancarz / Zenon Plech / Marek Cieślak / Bolesław Proch) – 2nd – 28pts (5)
- 1977 – (Poland) Wrocław, Olympic Stadium (with Edward Jancarz / Bogusław Nowak / Marek Cieślak / Ryszard Fabiszewski) – 2nd – 25pts (6)
- 1978 – (West Germany) Landshut, Ellermühle Stadium (with Edward Jancarz / Zenon Plech / Marek Cieślak / Andrzej Huszcza) – 3rd – 16+3pts (3)
- 1980 – (Poland) Wrocław, Olympic Stadium (with Zenon Plech / Roman Jankowski / Andrzej Huszcza / Edward Jancarz) – 3rd – 15pt (0)
