= Piotr Bruzda =

Polish speedway rider

- Born: 21 March 1946; Środa Śląska, Poland
- Died: 22 January 1997 (aged 50)
- Nationality: Polish

Career history
- 1965-1981: WTS Sparta Wrocław

Individual honours
- 1968: Poland Silver Helmet Winner

Team honours
- 1975: Speedway World Pairs Championship silver medal

Piotr Bruzda (1946–1997) was an international speedway rider from Poland.

== Speedway career ==
Bruzda reached the final of the Speedway World Pairs Championship in the 1975 Speedway World Pairs Championship at the Olympic Stadium in Wrocław, winning a silver medal riding with Edward Jancarz.

== World Final appearances ==
=== World Pairs Championship ===
- 1975 - (Poland) Wrocław, Olympic Stadium (with Edward Jancarz) - 2nd - 23pts (15)
