= Carl Glover =

British motorcycle speedway rider

- Born: 11 October 1952 (age 74); Sheffield, England
- Nationality: British (English)

Career history
- 1971-1974, 1977: Boston Barracudas
- 1974-1977: Sheffield Tigers
- 1977-1978: King's Lynn Stars

Individual honours
- 1974: Second Division Riders Champion

Team honours
- 1973: British League Division Two Champion
- 1973: British League Div Two KO Cup Winner
- 1974, 1977: British League KO Cup Winner
- 1974: Northern Trophy Winner

Carl Glover (born 11 October 1952) is a former motorcycle speedway rider from England. He earned one international cap for the England national speedway team and later managed the national team in 1984.

== Biography ==
Born in Sheffield, Glover worked as a baker before taking up speedway in 1969 on Mablethorpe sands. After riding in second half races at Sheffield in 1970, he made his league debut the following year with Boston Barracudas in the British League Division Two, averaging over seven points from 36 matches. Three further seasons with Boston followed, and in the 1973 season he averaged 9.62, scoring six full maximum and seven paid maximum scores on his way to winning the league and cup double.

Glover improved further in 1974, averaging 10.29, with eleven full maximum scores. He also won the Second Division Riders Final at Wimbledon in 1974. Glover was a regular member of the Division Two representative 'Young England' team between 1971 and 1974.

Glover had made his Division One debut in 1971 for West Ham Hammers, and one-off matches followed in 1973 for Halifax Dukes, Reading Racers, Swindon Robins, and Wolverhampton Wolves. In 1974 he doubled up on a more regular basis with Sheffield Tigers, averaging 6.4 from eleven matches. In 1975 he made the move to the top division full-time with Sheffield, and also made his debut in the full England team. A drop in form in 1977 saw him transferred to King's Lynn Stars, and he also rode again in Division Two for Boston, but he never regained his earlier form and announced his retirement in July 1978, intending to ride in the German league. He came out of retirement for a single match for Sheffield in 1980.

After retiring from racing, Glover became manager of the Sheffield Tigers team, and later managed the England team.

== Family ==
Carl's brother Les Glover was also a professional speedway rider.
