= Carina Speedway =

Speedway stadium in Queensland, Australia

- Location: 104 Alex, Alex Walker Rd, Alloway QLD 4670, Australia
- Coordinates: 24°58′34″S 152°23′44″E
- Opened: 16 June 1966
- Length: 0.46 km (0.29 mi)

Carina Speedway is a speedway venue, approximately 12 kilometres south from the centre of Bundaberg, in Queensland, Australia. It is located off the Goodwood Road, on Alex Walker Road. It is primarily used for stock cars.

== History ==
The track was opened on 16 June 1966 by the Bundaberg Speedway Association.

The venue grew in size and raced midget cars, sidecars and speedcars and held the 1975 Australian Formula 500 Speedcar Championship.

It also became a significant venue for motorcycle speedway and held important events, including a qualifying round of the 1977 Speedway World Championship (on 28 November 1976) and had previously held the Queensland Solo Championship during the 1966/1967 season.

The venue closed in June 2006 but re-opened under new management in 2015. Another closure followed but in 2022 racing returned.
