= Lars Ericsson =

Swedish former motorcycle speedway rider

- Born: 16 April 1956 (age 70); Torsby, Sweden
- Nationality: Swedish

Career history

Sweden
- 1975-1976, 1980-1985: Solkatterna
- 1977-1979: Indianerna

Great Britain
- 1978: Leicester Lions

Team honours
- 1984: Allsvenskan Div 1 Champion
- 1982: Allsvenskan Div 1 (North) Champion
- 1981: Allsvenskan Div 2 (North) Champion
- 1976: Allsvenskan Div 3 (South) Champion

Lars Ericsson also spelt Ericson (born 16 April 1956) is a Swedish former motorcycle speedway rider.

== Career ==
Born in Torsby, Ericsson rode in the Swedish Third Division in 1976 for Solkatterna, moving up to the Swedish top flight in 1977 with Indianerna. He competed in the 1977 Individual Speedway Junior European Championship, finishing seventh. In 1978, he was signed by Leicester Lions, but he failed to score consistently and was released after riding in seven matches.

In the British leagues, Ericsson rode for Leicester Lions during the 1978 British League season but struggled and was dropped from the team.
