= Mike Farrell (speedway rider) =

Australian speedway rider

- Born: 20 April 1955 (age 71); Brisbane, Queensland, Australia
- Nationality: Australian

Career history
- 1975–1978: Exeter Falcons
- 1979–1980: Leicester Lions

Team honours
- 1978: Spring Gold Cup

Michael Farrell (born 20 April 1955) is an Australian former motorcycle speedway rider who rode for the Exeter Falcons and Leicester Lions. He earned 12 international caps for the Australia national speedway team.

== Career ==
Farrell rode in short-track and scrambling competition in the late 1960s and early 1970s before taking up speedway, while also working as a motorcycle mechanic. He won the Queensland Junior Championship in 1974 and also the Barrier Reef Championship.

During the 1974–75 British Lions tour of Australia , Farrell was spotted in a North Qld vs Great Britain meeting by Lions team manager Wally Mawdsley and made his British League debut with the Exeter Falcons in 1975 alongside then four time World Champion Ivan Mauger. A broken wrist meant that he missed most of the 1976 season but he progressed on his return, reaching the Intercontinental Final in 1978. He requested a transfer at the end of the season and in 1979 joined his friend John Titman at Leicester Lions. A hand injury limited his season and the following season only lasted until April, when he suffered a broken leg while riding in a Midland League match against Birmingham, complications from the injury ending his career.

== Career record ==
All figures relate to the British League.

Year	Team	Matches	Rides	Points	Bonus	Total	Average	Full Maximum	Paid Maximum
1975	Exeter Falcons	36	134	130	28	158	4.72		
1976	Exeter Falcons	2	7	9	3	12	6.86		
1977	Exeter Falcons	38	142	196	34	230	6.48		
1978	Exeter Falcons	33	131	188	33	221	6.75	2	1
1979	Leicester Lions	33	144	190.5	25	215.5	5.99		
