= Bogusław Nowak =

Polish speedway rider (1952–2024)

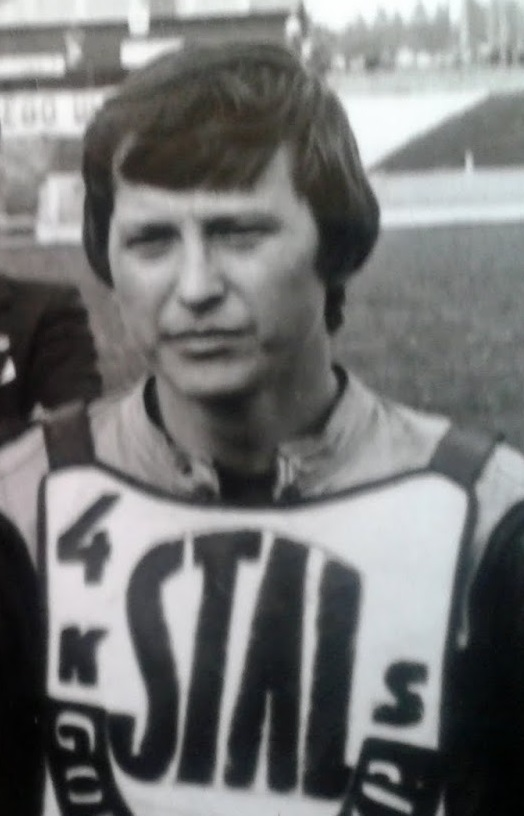
- Born: 29 January 1952; Gorzów Wielkopolski, Poland
- Died: 10 July 2024 (aged 72); Gorzów Wielkopolski, Poland
- Nationality: Polish

Career history
- 1970-1984: Stal Gorzów Wielkopolski
- 1985-1988: Unia Tarnów

Individual honours
- 1977: Polish Champion

Team honours
- 1977: Speedway World Team Cup silver medal
- 1973, 1975, 1976, 1977, 1978, 1983: Polish League Champion

Bogusław Nowak (29 January 1952 – 10 July 2024) was a Polish international speedway rider.

== Speedway career ==
Although he did not ride in Britain, Nowak toured the United Kingdom during Poland's 1973 tour when the Poles created significant interest over their fearless riding styles.

Nowak won a silver medal at the Speedway World Team Cup in the 1977 Speedway World Team Cup. He also stood as reserve for the 1977 Individual Speedway World Championship after finishing eighth in the Continental final.

In 1988, Nowak was involved in an accident while racing, after which he used a wheelchair.

Nowak died on 10 July 2024.

== World final appearances ==
=== World Team Cup ===
- 1977 - (Poland) Wrocław, Olympic Stadium (with Edward Jancarz / Marek Cieślak / Jerzy Rembas / Ryszard Fabiszewski) - 2nd - 25pts
