= Ryszard Fabiszewski =

Polish speedway rider

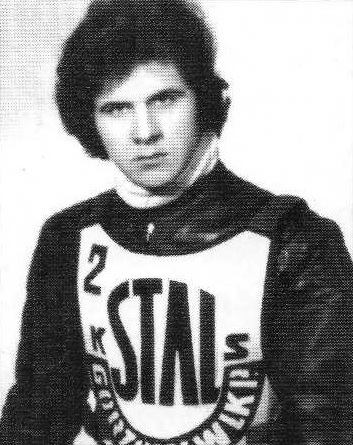
- Born: 15 May 1952 (age 74); Gorzów Wielkopolski, Poland
- Nationality: Polish

Career history
- 1971-1982: Stal Gorzów Wielkopolski
- 1983-1984: Polonia Bydgoszcz

Team honours
- 1977: Speedway World Team Cup silver medal
- 1973, 1975, 1976, 1977, 1978: Polish League Champion

Ryszard Fabiszewski (born 15 May 1952) is a former international speedway rider from Poland.

== Speedway career ==
Although he did not ride in Britain, Fabiszewski toured the United Kingdom during Poland's 1973 tour when the Poles created significant interest over their fearless riding styles.

Fabiszewski won a silver medal at the Speedway World Team Cup in the 1977 Speedway World Team Cup.

== World final appearances ==
=== World Team Cup ===
- 1977 - (Poland) Wrocław, Olympic Stadium (with Edward Jancarz / Marek Cieślak / Jerzy Rembas / Bogusław Nowak) - 2nd - 25pts
