= Christer Sjösten =

Swedish speedway rider

- Born: 2 September 1948; Avesta Municipality, Sweden
- Died: 9 December 1979 (aged 31); Royal Brisbane Hospital, Australia
- Nationality: Swedish

Career history

Sweden
- 1969-1970, 1979: Masarna
- 1971: Indianerna
- 1972: Smederna
- 1973-1974: Lindarna
- 1975-1978: Bysarna
- 1979: Getingarna

Great Britain
- 1971: Wembley Lions
- 1972: Exeter Falcons
- 1973: Coatbridge Tigers
- 1975-1979: Poole Pirates

Team honours
- 1975: Allsvenskan Champion

Christer Sjösten (2 September 1948 – 9 December 1979) was an international motorcycle speedway rider from Sweden. He earned eight caps for the Sweden national speedway team.

== Speedway career ==
Sjösten was a four-time Swedish finalist, winning in 1972, 1974, 1975 and 1977. He rode in the top tier of British Speedway from 1971 to 1979, riding for Wembley, Exeter, Coatbridge and Poole.

In the Swedish Speedway Team Championship, Sjösten rode for Masarna, Indianerna, Smederna, Lindarna, Bysarna and Getingarna.

Sjösten died at the Royal Brisbane Hospital in Australia on 9 December 1979, following a serious accident at the Brisbane Exhibition Speedway during a tournament 8 days earlier. Following his death, his older brother Sören Sjösten (one of the world's leading riders) retired.

== See also ==
- Rider deaths in motorcycle speedway
