= Geoff Bouchard =

British former motorcycle speedway rider

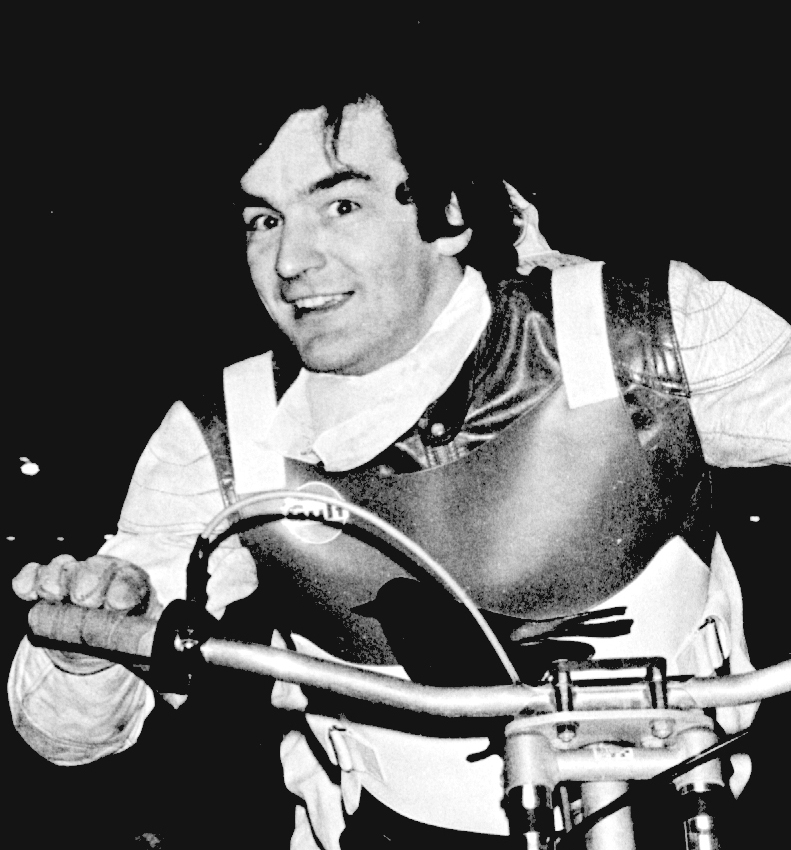
- Born: 5 September 1948 (age 78); Leicester, England
- Nationality: British (English)

Career history
- 1970–1974: Long Eaton Rangers/Archers
- 1971: Cradley Heathens
- 1971–1972: Wolverhampton Wolves
- 1972: Leicester Lions
- 1973: Reading Racers
- 1973–1979: Swindon Robins

Geoffrey Alan Bouchard (born 5 September 1948) is a former motorcycle speedway rider from England.

== Biography ==
Bouchard was born in Leicester in 1948. After initially competing in trials and sidecar racing, he took up speedway in 1969 at Long Eaton, and broke into the Long Eaton team in 1970, riding in the second tier of the British League. By 1971, his average rose to over eight points, his performances earned him rides in the top division for Cradley Heathens, Wolverhampton Wolves, Leicester Lions, Reading Racers, and Swindon Robins between 1971 and 1973. He made the Swindon team for nine matches in each of the 1973 and 1974 seasons, and became a full-time Swindon rider in 1975, averaging 4.12 from 34 matches. He stayed at Swindon until 1979, becoming a consistent second-string scorer.

Bouchard was included in the Young England team on several occasions between 1971 and 1974, and competed in the Second Division (2nd Division) Riders Final in 1973 and 1974, finishing fifth in the latter. At the beginning of the 1976 season, Bouchard's wife gave birth to twin boys.

Bouchard retired from racing in 1979 after suffering a punctured lung in an accident at Leicester. He then acted as machine examiner at Leicester Stadium until speedway closed down in Leicester in 1983.
