= Tom Godal =

Norwegian speedway rider

- Born: 6 July 1953 (age 73); Notodden, Norway
- Nationality: Norwegian

Career history

Norway
- 1977: Larvik

Great Britain
- 1977-1978: Halifax Dukes
- 1978-1979: Leicester Lions

Tomas Godal (born 6 July 1953) is a former motorcycle speedway rider from Norway. He earned two caps for the Norway national speedway team.

== Biography ==
Born in Notodden, Godal gained his early experience in Norway, and finished fourth in the Norwegian Championship in 1975.

In 1977, Godal signed for Halifax Dukes, moving on to Leicester Lions in April 1978. Never averaging above five points in a season, his last year in British speedway was 1979.
