= Jan Hádek =

Czech speedway rider

- Born: 4 September 1945 (age 81); Czechoslovakia
- Nationality: Czech

Team honours
- 1974: World Pairs finalist

Jan Hádek (born 4 September 1945) is a Czech former speedway rider. He is grandfather of the speedway rider Michael Hádek.

== Speedway career ==
Hádek partnered Jan Holub I to the World Pairs final at the 1974 Speedway World Pairs Championship, which was won by Sweden.

In 1977, the Bristol Bulldogs team manager Pat Tapson unsuccessfully asked the Czech authorities to allow Hádek and Holub to compete in the British leagues.

Hádek reached the semi-final of the FIM Long Track World Championship in 1979 and appeared in five national longtrack finals in 1977, 1978, 1979, 1980 and 1982.

== World Final appearances ==
=== World Pairs Championship ===
- 1974 – (England) Manchester, Hyde Road (with Jan Holub I) – 7th – 6pts (3)
