= 1980 British Speedway Championship =

Seasons
- ← 1979 1981 →

The 1980 British Speedway Championship was the 20th edition of the British Speedway Championship. The Final took place on 4 June at Brandon in Coventry, England. The Championship was won by Dave Jessup, who scored a 15-point maximum. Former two-time champion Michael Lee finished as the runner-up, with Phil Collins in third.

== British Final ==
- 4 June 1980
- (England) Brandon Stadium, Coventry

Pos.	Rider	Heat Scores	Total
1	(England) Dave Jessup	(3,3,3,3,3)	15
2	(England) Michael Lee	(3,3,3,3,2)	14
3	(England) Phil Collins	(1,2,2,3,3)	11
4	(England) Peter Collins	(3,3,0,3,1)	10
5	(England) Gordon Kennett	(2,2,2,2,2)	10
6	(England) John Louis	(3,1,3,1,1)	9
7	(England) John Davis	(X,2,1,2,3)	8
8	(England) Chris Morton	(0,1,1,2,3)	7
9	(England) Melvyn Taylor	(2,1,X,2,2)	7
10	(England) Reg Wilson	(2,2,1,1,0)	6+3
11	(Scotland) Bobby Beaton	(0,1,3,0,2)	6+2
12	(England) Ian Cartwright	(1,0,2,1,1)	5
13	(England) Dave Morton	(1,3,0,0,0)	4
14	(England) Kevin Jolly	(2,0,1,0,1)	4
15	(Rhodesia) Peter Prinsloo	(2,1,0,1,0)	4
16	(England) Mike Lanham	(0,0,0,0,0)	0

== British Under 21 final ==
Mark Courtney won the British Speedway Under 21 Championship. The final was held at Kingsmead Stadium on 12 July.

Pos.	Rider	Points
1	Mark Courtney	14
2	Kevin Smith	12
3	John Barker	11+3
4	Bob Garrad	11+2
5	Tim Hunt	9
6	Neil Collins	9
7	Nigel Sparshott	8
8	Nigel Flatman	8
9	Paul Stead	7
10	Peter Carr	7
11	Mark Baldwin	6
12	Dennis Mallett	6
13	Steve Crockett	5
14	Charlie McKinna	3
15	Martin Hewlett	3
16	Mark Bilner	1

== See also ==
- British Speedway Championship
- 1980 Individual Speedway World Championship
