= 1979 British Speedway Championship =

Speedway event

- Venue: Brandon Stadium, Coventry
- Start date: 20 June

The 1979 British Speedway Championship was the 19th edition of the British Speedway Championship. The Final took place on 20 June at Brandon Stadium in Coventry, England. The Championship was won by Peter Collins, who scored a 15-point maximum. Former two-time champion Michael Lee finished as the runner-up, with Dave Jessup in third.

== British Final ==
- 20 June 1979
- (England) Coventry

| Placing | Rider | Total | 1 | 2 | 3 | 4 | 5 | 6 | 7 | 8 | 9 | 10 | 11 | 12 | 13 | 14 | 15 | 16 | 17 | 18 | 19 | 20 | Pts | Pos | 21 |
|---|---|---|---|---|---|---|---|---|---|---|---|---|---|---|---|---|---|---|---|---|---|---|---|---|---|
| 1 | (England) (9) Peter Collins | 15 | | | 3 | | 3 | | | | | | 3 | | | | | 3 | | 3 | | | 15 | 1 | |
| 2 | (England) (8) Michael Lee | 14 | | 3 | | | | | | 3 | | | 2 | | | 3 | | | 3 | | | | 14 | 2 | |
| 3 | (England) (7) Dave Jessup | 12 | | 2 | | | | | 3 | | | | | 2 | 3 | | | | | 2 | | | 12 | 3 | |
| 4 | (England) (16) John Davis | 11 | | | | 3 | | | | 2 | 3 | | | | | | 2 | | | 1 | | | 11 | 4 | |
| 5 | (England) (10) Doug Wyer | 10 | | | 1 | | | 2 | | | | | | 3 | | | 3 | | 1 | | | | 10 | 5 | |
| 6 | (England) (11) Malcolm Simmons | 10 | | | 2 | | | | 2 | | 1 | | | | | 2 | | | | | | 3 | 10 | 6 | |
| 7 | (England) (12) Roger Johns | 8 | | | F | | | | | 1 | | 3 | | | 1 | | | | | | 3 | | 8 | 7 | |
| 8 | (England) (1) Gordon Kennett | 7 | 3 | | | | E | | | | 0 | | | | 2 | | | | 2 | | | | 7 | 8 | |
| 9 | (England) (13) Alan Molyneux | 7 | | | | 2 | 1 | | | | | | | 1 | | 1 | | | | | 2 | | 7 | 9 | |
| 10 | (England) (2) John Louis | 6 | 2 | | | | | 3 | | | | 1 | | | | 0 | | | | 0 | | | 6 | 10 | 3 |
| 11 | (England) (6) Chris Morton | 6 | | 0 | | | | 1 | | | 2 | | | | | | | 2 | | | 1 | | 6 | 11 | 2 |
| 12 | (England) (5) Reg Wilson | 6 | | 1 | | | 2 | | | | | 0 | | | | | 1 | | | | | 2 | 6 | 12 | |
| 13 | (Scotland) (15) Jim McMillan | 4 | | | | 0 | | | 1 | | | 2 | | | | | | 1 | 0 | | | | 4 | 13 | |
| 14 | (England) (14) Alan Grahame | 3 | | | | 1 | | 0 | | | | | 1 | | 0 | | | | | | | 1 | 3 | 14 | |
| 15 | (England) (4) Mike Lanham | 1 | 1 | | | | | | | 0 | | | | 0 | | | | 0 | | | | 0 | 1 | 15 | |
| 16 | (England) (3) Ian Turner | 0 | E | | | | | | 0 | | | | 0 | | | | 0 | | | | 0 | | 0 | 16 | |
| R1 | (England) (R1) Craig Pendlebury | 0 | | | | | | | | | | | | | | | | | | | | | 0 | R1 | |
| R2 | (England) (R2) Ian Cartwright | 0 | | | | | | | | | | | | | | | | | | | | | 0 | R2 | |
| Placing | Rider | Total | 1 | 2 | 3 | 4 | 5 | 6 | 7 | 8 | 9 | 10 | 11 | 12 | 13 | 14 | 15 | 16 | 17 | 18 | 19 | 20 | Pts | Pos | 21 |

m - exclusion for exceeding two minute time allowance • t - exclusion for touching the tapes • x - other exclusion • e - retired or mechanical failure • f - fell • ns - non-starter • nc - non-classify

| gate A - inside | gate B | gate C | gate D - outside |

== British Under 21 final ==
Kenny Carter won the British Speedway Under 21 Championship. The final was held at Kingsmead Stadium on 23 June.

| Pos. | Rider | Points |
|---|---|---|
| 1 | Kenny Carter | 12+3 |
| 2 | Nigel Flatman | 12+2 |
| 3 | Melvyn Taylor | 12+1 |
| 4 | Peter Ellams | 11 |
| 5 | Mark Courtney | 10 |
| 6 | John Barker | 9 |
| 7 | Tim Hunt | 8 |
| 8 | Paul Embley | 8 |
| 9 | Kevin Smith | 7 |
| 10 | Richard Knight | 6 |
| 11 | Dennis Mallett | 5 |
| 12 | Keith Bloxsome | 5 |
| 13 | Charlie McKinna | 5 |
| 14 | Martin Dixon | 4 |
| 15 | Rob Dolman | 4 |
| 16 | Peter Tarrant | 3 |

== See also ==
- British Speedway Championship
