= 1985 British Speedway Championship =

Seasons
- ← 1984 1986 →

The 1985 British Speedway Championship was the 25th edition of the British Speedway Championship. The Final took place on 12 June at Brandon in Coventry, England. The Championship was won by Kenny Carter, who scored a 15-point maximum. John Davis was second, while Kelvin Tatum completed the rostrum in third place.

== British Championship ==
=== Qualifying ===
Qualification Round 1

- 17 April 1985
- (England) Long Eaton

Pos.	Rider	Points	Details
1	Trevor Banks	13	
2	Dave Perks	13	
3	Louis Carr	11	
4	Joe Owen	10	
5	Colin Cook	10	
6	Steve Schofield	9	
7	Julian Parr	9	
8	David Tyler	8	
9	Kevin Smart	7	
10	Nigel Sparshott	6	
11	Chris Pidcock	5	
12	David Biles	5	
13	Graham Drury	4	
14	Nigel Flatman	4	
15	Colin Richardson	2	
16	John Proctor	1	
17	Pete Smith	0	

Qualification Round 2

- 18 April 1985
- (England) Middlesbrough

Pos.	Rider	Points	Details
1	Steve Wilcock	14	
2	Geoff Pusey	12	
3	Mike Spink	11	
4	Andy Buck	10	
5	Andy Reid	10	
6	Phil White	9	
7	Martin Dixon	8	
8	Robert Henry	8	
9	Paul Bosley	7	
10	Steve Lawson	6	
11	Paul Clarke	6	
12	Dave Morton	6	
13	Derek Harrison	5	
14	Derek Richardson	4	
15	Gary Havelock	4	
16	Paul Stead	0	
17	Roland Tebbs	0	

Qualification Round 3

- 19 April 1985
- (Scotland) Edinburgh

Pos.	Rider	Points	Details
1	David Blackburn	14	
2	Bruce Cribb ( (New Zealand) )	12	
3	Paul Thorp	12	
4	Bobby Beaton ( (Scotland) )	12	
5	Eric Monaghan	10	
6	Martin Hagon	10	
7	Charlie McKinna ( (Scotland) )	10	
8	Jim McMillan	10	
9	Dave Trownson	5	
10	Sean Courtney	5	
11	Billy Burton	4	
12	Eric Broadbelt	4	
13	Steve Collins	4	
14	Mark Crang	3	
15	Barrie Dixon	3	
16	Steve Cook	2	
17	Martin Scarisbrick	0	

Qualification Round 4

- 19 April 1985
- (England) Peterborough

Pos.	Rider	Points	Details
1	Carl Blackbird	14	
2	Tim Hunt	13	
3	Kevin Hawkins	12	
4	Keith White	10	
5	Martin Goodwin	10	
6	Malcolm Holloway	9	
7	Ian Clark	8	
8	Gordon Kennett	8	
9	Ian Barney	7	
10	Gerald Short	6	
11	Andy Hines	6	
12	Dave Allan	6	
13	Keith Teager	5	
14	Carl Baldwin	4	
15	Alan Sage	2	
16	Alan Farmer	0	

=== Quarter-final ===
- 28 April 1985
- (England) King's Lynn

Pos.	Rider	Points	Details
1	Carl Blackbird	13	
2	Melvyn Taylor	13	
3	Tim Hunt	12	
4	Bruce Cribb ( (New Zealand) )	11	
5	Mike Spink	10	
6	Louis Carr	9	
7	David Blackburn	9	
8	Jamie Luckhurst	8	
9	Kevin Hawkins	7	
10	Dave Perks	7	
11	Trevor Banks	7	
12	Andrew Silver	5	
13	Mike Ferreira ( (Zimbabwe) )	3	
14	Paul Thorp	3	
15	Steve Wilcock	3	
16	Geoff Pusey	0	
17	Peter Chapman	0	

=== Semi finals ===
Semi Final 1

- 19 May 1985
- (England) Halifax

Pos.	Rider	Points	Details
1	Kenny Carter	14	
2	John Davis	14	
3	Neil Collins	12	
4	Phil Collins	10	
5	Neil Evitts	9	
6	Tim Hunt	9	
7	Peter Collins	9	
8	Andy Campbell	8	
9	Mark Courtney	7	
10	Sean Willmott	7	
11	Peter Carr	5	
12	Richard Knight	5	
13	Louis Carr	4	
14	Kevin Jolly	3	
15	Carl Blackbird	2	
16	Kenny McKinna ( (Scotland) )	2	
17	Ian Sutcliffe	0	

Semi Final 2

- 22 May 1985
- (England) Cradley Heath

Pos.	Rider	Points	Details
1	Andy Grahame	14	
2	Kelvin Tatum	13	
3	Simon Cross	12	
4	Chris Morton	12	
5	Andy Smith	11	
6	Les Collins	9	
7	Alan Grahame	7	
8	Dave Jessup	7	
9	Steve Bastable	7	
10	Jamie Luckhurst	6	
11	Mike Spink	5	
12	Jeremy Doncaster	5	
13	Melvyn Taylor	5	
14	David Blackburn	2	
15	Paul Woods	2	
16	Bruce Cribb ( (New Zealand) )	0	
17	Nigel Leaver	0	
18	John Bostin	0	

=== Final ===
- 12 June 1985
- (England) Brandon Stadium, Coventry

Placing	Rider	Total	1	2	3	4	5	6	7	8	9	10	11	12	13	14	15	16	17	18	19	20	Pts	Pos	21
1	(England) (2) Kenny Carter	15	3					3				3				3				3			15	1	
2	(England) (12) John Davis	14			3					3		2			3						3		14	2	
3	(England) (8) Kelvin Tatum	12		3						1			3			2			3				12	3	
4	(England) (9) Phil Collins	11			1		3						2					3		2			11	4	
5	(England) (6) Chris Morton	9		1				2			3							2			1		9	5	
6	(England) (16) Neil Collins	9				1				2	2						3			1			9	6	
7	(England) (3) Andy Smith	7	2						1				0				2				2		7	7	
8	(England) (5) Les Collins	6		2			0					0					1					3	6	8	3
9	(England) (13) Simon Cross	6				0	2							3		1					0		6	9	2
10	(England) (14) Neil Evitts	6				3		0					1		0							2	6	10	1
11	(England) (10) Peter Collins	5			2			1						1			E		1				5	11	
12	(England) (15) Tim Hunt	5				2			F			1						0	2				5	12	
13	(England) (11) Andy Grahame	4			0				3		0					0						1	4	13	
14	(England) (1) Dave Jessup	4	1				1				1				1				0				4	14	
15	(England) (7) Andy Campbell	4		0					2					0	2					0			4	15	
16	(England) (4) Alan Grahame	3	0							F				2				1				E	3	16	
R1	(England) (R1) Steve Bastable	0																					0	R1	
R2	(England) (R2) Mark Courtney	0																					0	R2	
Placing	Rider	Total	1	2	3	4	5	6	7	8	9	10	11	12	13	14	15	16	17	18	19	20	Pts	Pos	21

m - exclusion for exceeding two minute time allowance • t - exclusion for touching the tapes • x - other exclusion • e - retired or mechanical failure • f - fell • ns - non-starter • nc - non-classify

gate A - inside	gate B	gate C	gate D - outside

== British Under 21 final ==
Carl Blackbird won the British Speedway Under 21 Championship. The final was held at Kingsmead Stadium on 15 June.

Pos.	Rider	Points
1	Carl Blackbird	15
2	Dave Mullett	12+3
3	Andy Smith	12+2
4	Jamie Luckhurst	10
5	Nigel De'Ath	10
6	Gary Havelock	9
7	Simon Cross	9
8	Andy Galvin	7
9	Paul Whittaker	7
10	Andrew Silver	6
11	Paul Clarke	6
12	Carl Baldwin	4
13	David Smart	4
14	Kevin Price	3
15	Neville Tatum	2
16	Lawrie Bloomfield (res)	2
17	Jeremy Luckhurst	1
18	Mark Terry (res)	1

== See also ==
- British Speedway Championship
- 1985 Individual Speedway World Championship
