= 1978 British Speedway Championship =

Speedway event

- Venue: Brandon Stadium, Coventry
- Start date: 16 August 1978

The 1978 British Speedway Championship was the 18th edition of the British Speedway Championship. The Final took place on 16 August at Brandon Stadium in Coventry, England. The Championship was won by Michael Lee.

The British Under 21 Championship was won by Phil Collins.

== British Final ==
- 16 August 1978, Brandon Stadium, Coventry

Placing	Rider	Total	1	2	3	4	5	6	7	8	9	10	11	12	13	14	15	16	17	18	19	20	Pts	Pos	21
1	(England) (7) Michael Lee	14		3					3					3	3					2			14	1	
2	(England) (5) Dave Jessup	12		2			3					1					3					3	12	2	
3	(England) (16) Malcolm Simmons	11				0				3	3						2			3			11	3	
4	(England) (9) Gordon Kennett	10			2		2						2					3		1			10	4	3
5	(England) (1) Steve Bastable	10	3				1				2				1				3				10	5	2
6	(England) (12) Chris Morton	10			E					2		3			2						3		10	6	1
7	(England) (13) Tony Davey	8				3	0							2		3					0		8	7	
8	(England) (15) John Davis	8				2			2			2						2	0				8	8	
9	(England) (10) Les Collins	7			3			0						1			1		2				7	9	
10	(England) (6) Peter Collins	6		1				3			E							E			2		6	10	
11	(England) (8) Reg Wilson	6		0						0			3			2			1				6	11	
12	(England) (2) Doug Wyer	4	1					2				X				1				E			4	12	
13	(England) (14) Alan Grahame	4				1		1					0		0							2	4	13	
14	(Scotland) (4) Jim McMillan	3	2							1				0				T				0	3	14	
15	(England) (11) John Louis	3			1				0		1					0						1	3	15	
16	(England) (3) Dave Morton	3	0						1				1				0				1		3	16	
R3	(England) (R3) Mick Bell	1																1					1	R3	
Placing	Rider	Total	1	2	3	4	5	6	7	8	9	10	11	12	13	14	15	16	17	18	19	20	Pts	Pos	21

m - exclusion for exceeding two minute time allowance • t - exclusion for touching the tapes • x - other exclusion • e - retired or mechanical failure • f - fell • ns - non-starter • nc - non-classify

gate A - inside	gate B	gate C	gate D - outside

== British Under 21 final ==
- 24 June 1978, Rye House Stadium, Hoddesdon

Pos	Rider	Pts
1	Phil Collins	15
2	Ian Gledhill	10+3
3	Bob Garrad	10+2
4	Melvyn Taylor	10+1
5	Steve Naylor	9
6	John Hack	9
7	Pip Lamb	9
8	Brendan Shilleto	8
9	Nigel Flatman	8
10	Kenny Carter	7
11	Louis Carr	5
12	Paul Woods	5
13	Neil Leeks	5
14	Sean Willmott	5
15	Derek Harrison	3
16	Mike Spink	2
17	Dave Shepherd (res)	0

== See also ==
- British Speedway Championship
