= 1981 British Speedway Championship =

Seasons
- ← 1980 1982 →

The 1981 British Speedway Championship was the 21st edition of the British Speedway Championship. The Final took place on 3 June at Brandon in Coventry, England. The Championship was won by Steve Bastable, who beat Kenny Carter and John Louis in a run-off for the title. The top eight riders qualified for the next stage of the World Championship, the 1981 Overseas Final.

== British Final ==
- 3 June 1981
- (England) Brandon Stadium, Coventry

Placing	Rider	Total	1	2	3	4	5	6	7	8	9	10	11	12	13	14	15	16	17	18	19	20	Pts	Pos	21
1	(England) (3) Steve Bastable	13	2						3				3				3				2		13	1	3
2	(England) (2) Kenny Carter	13	3					2				3				2				3			13	2	2
3	(England) (5) John Louis	13		3			3					2					2					3	13	3	1
4	(England) (4) Les Collins	12	1							3				3				3				2	12	4	
5	(England) (10) Chris Morton	10			3			3						2			1		1				10	5	
6	(England) (6) Dave Jessup	9		2				1			1							2			3		9	6	
7	(England) (16) Michael Lee	8				3				1	3						0			1			8	7	
8	(England) (15) Ian Cartwright	7				2			0			1						1	3				7	8	
9	(England) (13) Malcolm Simmons	6				0	2							1		3					0		6	9	3
10	(England) (11) Eric Broadbelt	6			0				2		2					1						1	6	10	2
11	(England) (9) Phil Collins	6			2		0						2					0		2			6	11	1
12	(England) (7) Melvyn Taylor	5		1					1					0	3					0			5	12	
13	(England) (1) John Davis	5	-				1				0				2				2				5	13	
14	(England) (12) Gordon Kennett	5			1					2		0			1						1		5	14	
15	(England) (14) Kevin Smith	2				1		0					1		0							0	2	15	
16	(England) (8) Kevin Jolly	0		0						0			0			0			0				0	16	
R1	(England) (R1) Keith White	0	0																				0	R1	
Placing	Rider	Total	1	2	3	4	5	6	7	8	9	10	11	12	13	14	15	16	17	18	19	20	Pts	Pos	21

m - exclusion for exceeding two minute time allowance • t - exclusion for touching the tapes • x - other exclusion • e - retired or mechanical failure • f - fell • ns - non-starter • nc - non-classify

gate A - inside	gate B	gate C	gate D - outside

== British Under 21 final ==
Rob Lightfoot won the British Speedway Under 21 Championship. The final was held at Kingsmead Stadium on 4 July.

Pos.	Rider	Points
1	Rob Lightfoot	14
2	Peter Carr	13
3	Neil Evitts	11
4	Martin Hewlett	10
5	Charlie McKinna	10
6	Dennis Mallett	10
7	Simon Wigg	9
8	Andy Hibbs	7
9	Wayne Jackson	7
10	Martin Dixon	6
11	Paul Evitts	5
12	Paul Stead	5
13	Jamie Luckhurst	4
14	Andy Buck	3
15	Dave Mullett (res)	3
16	Peter Tarrant	2
17	Rob Tilbury (res)	1
18	Nigel Sparshott	0

== See also ==
- British Speedway Championship
- 1981 Individual Speedway World Championship
