= 1972 British Speedway Championship =

Speedway event

- Venue: Brandon Stadium, Coventry
- Start date: 2 August 1972

The 1972 British Speedway Championship was the 12th edition of the British Speedway Championship. The final took place on 2 August at Brandon Stadium in Coventry, England. The Championship was won by Ivan Mauger.

The British Under 21 Championship was won by Allan Emmett.

== British Final ==
- 2 August 1972, Brandon Stadium, Coventry

Placing	Rider	Total	1	2	3	4	5	6	7	8	9	10	11	12	13	14	15	16	17	18	19	20	Pts	Pos	21
1	(New Zealand) (6) Ivan Mauger	14		3				3			3							2			3		14	1	
2	(England) (12) Nigel Boocock	12			3					2		2			3						2		12	2	
3	(New Zealand) (4) Barry Briggs	11	1							3				3				1				3	11	3	3
4	(England) (8) John Louis	11		2						1			3			3			2				11	4	E
5	(England) (9) Eric Boocock	10			2		2						1					3		2			10	5	3
6	(Scotland) (2) Jim McMillan	10	3					1				3				0				3			10	6	2
7	(England) (15) Terry Betts	9				3			2			1						0	3				9	7	
8	(England) (10) Ray Wilson	7			T			2						1			3		1				7	8	
9	(England) (11) Dave Jessup	7			1				3		T					2						1	7	9	
10	(Australia) (13) John Boulger	7				0	3							2		1					1		7	10	
11	(England) (3) Martin Ashby	6	2						1				2				1				0		6	11	
12	(England) (16) Arnold Haley	5				1				0	1						2			1			5	12	
13	(Australia) (5) Garry Middleton	4		1			1					0					0					2	4	13	
14	(England) (1) Peter Collins	3	0				E				2				1				0				3	14	
15	(England) (7) Trevor Hedge	2		0					E					0	2					0			2	15	
16	(New Zealand) (14) Ronnie Moore	2				2		E					0		0							0	2	16	
R1	(England) (R1) Pete Bailey	0			0																		0	R1	
R2	(England) (R2) Norman Hunter	0									F												0	R2	
Placing	Rider	Total	1	2	3	4	5	6	7	8	9	10	11	12	13	14	15	16	17	18	19	20	Pts	Pos	21

m - exclusion for exceeding two minute time allowance • t - exclusion for touching the tapes • x - other exclusion • e - retired or mechanical failure • f - fell • ns - non-starter • nc - non-classify

gate A - inside	gate B	gate C	gate D - outside

== British Under 21 final ==
- 24 June 1972, Kingsmead Stadium, Canterbury

Pos	Rider	Pts
1	Allan Emmett	14
2	Gordon Kennett	12
3	Tony Davey	11+3
4	Trevor Barnwell	11+2
5	Dave Piddock	10
6	Alan Sage	9
7	Dave Kennett	9
8	Barney Kennett	8
9	John Davis	7
10	Roger Johns	7
11	Robbie Gardener	6
12	Bobby McNeil	5
13	Carl Glover	4
14	Frank Auffret	4
15	Trevor Geer	3
16	Mike Lanham (res)	1
17	Phil Bass	0
18	Rod Haynes (res)	0

== See also ==
- British Speedway Championship
