= 1975 British Speedway Championship =

Speedway event

- Venue: Brandon Stadium, Coventry
- Start date: 30 July 1975

The 1975 British Speedway Championship was the 15th edition of the British Speedway Championship. The Final took place on 30 July at Brandon Stadium in Coventry, England. The Championship was won by John Louis.

The British Under 21 Championship was won by Neil Middleditch.

== British Final ==
- 30 July 1975, Brandon Stadium, Coventry

Placing	Rider	Total	1	2	3	4	5	6	7	8	9	10	11	12	13	14	15	16	17	18	19	20	Pts	Pos
1	(England) (6) John Louis	15		3				3			3							3			3		15	1
2	(England) (8) Peter Collins	13+3		2						2			3			3			3				13	2
3	(England) (9) Malcolm Simmons	13+2			3		3						2					2		3			13	3
4	(England) (12) Ray Wilson	11+3			F					3		3			3						2		11	4
5	(England) (3) Martin Ashby	11+2	3						3				1				3				1		11	5
6	(England) (10) Chris Pusey	10			1			2						3			2		2				10	6
7	(England) (11) Tony Davey	9			2				2		1					1						3	9	7
8	(England) (1) Gordon Kennett	6	2				1				2				1				0				6	8
9	(England) (2) Dave Jessup	6	0					0				2				2				2			6	9
10	(England) (4) Doug Wyer	5	1							1				2				1				0	5	10
11	(Scotland) (7) Jim McMillan	5		1					1					0	2					1			5	11
12	(England) (13) Bob Kilby	5				2	2							1		0					0		5	12
13	(England) (14) Chris Morton	5				3		1					0		0							1	5	13
14	(England) (5) Dave Morton	3		0			E					1					0					2	3	14
15	(England) (16) Alan Wilkinson	2				1				0	F						1			0			2	15
16	(England) (15) Carl Glover	1				0			0			0						0	1				1	16
	(England) (17) Nigel Boocock	0																					0	
	(Scotland) (18) Bobby Beaton	0																					0	
Placing	Rider	Total	1	2	3	4	5	6	7	8	9	10	11	12	13	14	15	16	17	18	19	20	Pts	Pos

m - exclusion for exceeding two minute time allowance • t - exclusion for touching the tapes • x - other exclusion • e - retired or mechanical failure • f - fell • ns - non-starter • nc - non-classify

gate A - inside	gate B	gate C	gate D - outside

== British Under 21 final ==
- 28 June 1975, Kingsmead Stadium, Canterbury

Pos	Rider	Pts
1	Neil Middleditch	13+3
2	Steve Weatherley	13+2
3	Joe Owen	12+3
4	Michael Lee	12+2
5	Andy Hines	12+1
6	Billy Burton	8
7	Robert Hollingworth	8
8	Kevin Jolly	8
9	Duncan Meredith	7
10	Steve Finch	5
11	Andy Sims	5
12	Steve Bastable	4
13	Gerald Purkiss	4
14	Ian Silk	4
15	Tom Davie	2
16	Mike Bessant	1
17	Steve Gibson (res)	1
18	John Hopper (res)	0

== See also ==
- British Speedway Championship
