= 1987 National League season =

Second tier of speedway racing in the United Kingdom

- League: National League
- No. of competitors: 16
- Champions: Eastbourne Eagles
- Knockout Cup: Eastbourne Eagles
- Individual: Andrew Silver
- Pairs: Mildenhall Fen Tigers
- Fours: Mildenhall Fen Tigers
- Highest average: Andrew Silver
- Division/s above: 1987 British League

In 1987 the National League, also known as British League Division Two, was the second tier of speedway racing in the United Kingdom.

== Team changes ==
Glasgow Tigers were without a home so they joined the 1987 season based at Workington's Derwent Park.

== Mid-season withdrawals ==
On 1 August, Boston Barracudas withdrew after a heavy home defeat to Eastbourne. On 13 September, Glasgow Tigers (now called Workington Tigers) held their last fixture against Wimbledon. Both Glasgow-Workington and Boston had their results expunged.

== Summary ==
The league champions that year were Eastbourne Eagles.

== Final table ==
Pos	Team	PL	W	D	L	Pts
1	Eastbourne Eagles	30	22	0	8	44
2	Mildenhall Fen Tigers	30	20	1	9	41
3	Milton Keynes Knights	30	19	1	10	39
4	Stoke Potters	30	18	1	11	37
5	Peterborough Panthers	30	18	0	12	36
6	Berwick Bandits	30	17	1	22	35
7	Wimbledon Dons	30	14	2	14	30
8	Poole Pirates	30	15	0	15	30
9	Middlesbrough Tigers	30	13	3	14	29
10	Edinburgh Monarchs	30	13	2	15	28
11	Newcastle Diamonds	30	12	2	16	26
12	Arena Essex Hammers	30	12	1	17	25
13	Canterbury Crusaders	30	11	1	18	23
14	Exeter Falcons	30	11	1	18	23
15	Long Eaton Invaders	30	8	1	21	17
16	Rye House Rockets	30	8	1	21	17

== Fixtures and results ==
Home \ Away	AE	BER	CAN	EAS	ED	EX	LE	MID	MIL	MK	NEW	PET	PP	RH	STO	WIM
Arena Essex		37–41	41–36	38–40	39–38	49–27	53–25	41–36	36–42	34–44	37–40	38–40	41–35	39–39	37–41	46–31
Berwick	42–36		48–30	42–35	51–27	60–18	63–14	52–26	43–35	45–33	47–30	50–28	57–21	60–18	44–33	40–36
Canterbury	34–43	55–23		43–35	40–38	44–34	52–26	35–41	35–43	42–36	50–28	44–34	42–36	42–36	34–44	39–39
Eastbourne	50–28	53–25	57–21		55–22	56–22	54–23	53–25	40–38	43–35	50–28	52–26	54–24	55–23	57–21	42–36
Edinburgh	40–38	43–34	59–19	38–39		54–24	46–32	49–29	39–39	34–44	44–34	44–34	43–35	46–31	43–35	42–35
Exeter	34–44	45–33	54–24	41–37	39–39		43–35	41–37	36–42	47–31	41–37	37–41	39–36	49–29	41–37	44–34
Long Eaton	37–41	46–31	37–41	42–35	50–28	44–34		39–39	38–40	34–44	35–43	42–36	43–34	37–41	47–31	42–35
Middlesbrough	39–38	44–34	47–31	33–45	49–29	52–26	40–37		37–41	39–39	41–36	44–33	40–38	55–23	40–38	43–35
Mildenhall	47–31	50–28	48–30	45–33	47–31	44–34	48–30	54–24		38–40	43–35	51–27	47–31	49–29	40–38	41–37
Milton Keynes	40–38	46–32	49–29	36–42	50–28	48–30	42–35	42–36	44–34		43–35	43–35	43–35	57–21	45–33	43–35
Newcastle	42–36	47–31	43–35	34–44	37–41	44–34	55–23	39–39	44–34	41–37		41–37	40–38	43–34	35–43	39–39
Peterborough	47–31	54–24	51–27	40–38	44–34	55–23	51–27	54–24	44–34	40–38	44–34		48–30	59–19	55–23	47–31
Poole	43–34	40–38	51–27	44–34	47–31	47–31	42–36	45–33	42–36	42–36	47–31	41–36		54–24	48–30	37–41
Rye House	36–39	29–49	43–35	33–45	41–36	46–32	43–34	40–36	33–39	43–34	46–31	34–44	36–42		32–46	36–42
Stoke	43–35	39–39	50–28	43–35	46–32	62–16	43–34	47–30	43–35	23–55	45–33	40–35	53–25	56–22		44–34
Wimbledon	38–40	43–35	51–27	38–40	43.5–34.5	41–37	41–36	52–26	40–38	42–36	49–29	42–36	48–29	56–22	38–40	

Legend: Blue = home team win; Yellow = draw; Red = away team win.

== National League Knockout Cup ==
The 1987 National League Knockout Cup was the 20th edition of the Knockout Cup for tier two teams. Eastbourne Eagles were the winners of the competition for the third successive year.

First round

Date	Team one	Score	Team two
24/05	Mildenhall	66-30	Rye House
17/05	Rye House	24-24a	Mildenhall
25/04	Berwick	64-32	Newcastle
20/04	Newcastle	51-44	Berwick

a=Abandoned

Second round

Date	Team one	Score	Team two
10/07	Peterborough	57-39	Middlesbrough
21/06	Glasgow	47-49	Edinburgh
21/06	Peterborough	34-32a	Middlesbrough
20/06	Berwick	65-31	Long Eaton
19/06	Edinburgh	65-31	Glasgow
18/06	Middlesbrough	56-40	Peterborough
17/06	Long Eaton	51-45	Berwick
17/06	Mildenhall	64-31	Exeter
16/06	Poole	51-45	Eastbourne
15/06	Exeter	51-45	Mildenhall
14/06	Eastbourne	62-33	Poole
01/06	Arena Essex	52-44	Wimbledon
30/05	Canterbury	61-35	Boston
25/05	Rye House	47-48	Mildenhall
20/05	Wimbledon	48-48	Arena Essex
16/05	Stoke	60-36	Milton Keynes
12/05	Milton Keynes	50-46	Stoke
10/05	Boston	50-46	Canterbury

a=Abandoned

Quarter-finals

Date	Team one	Score	Team two
01/08	Stoke	49-29	Peterborough
31/07	Edinburgh	45-50	Eastbourne
25/07	Berwick	46-50	Mildenhall
25/07	Canterbury	54-42	Arena Essex
25/07	Eastbourne	56-40	Edinburgh
24/07	Peterborough	50-46	Stoke
09/07	Arena Essex	60-36	Canterbury
01/07	Mildenhall	61-35	Berwick

Semi-finals

Date	Team one	Score	Team two
31/08	Mildenhall	60-36	Arena Essex
23/08	Eastbourne	57-39	Stoke
20/08	Arena Essex	51-45	Mildenhall
15/08	Stoke	53-42	Eastbourne

Final

First leg

27 September 1987

Mildenhall Fen Tigers Melvyn Taylor 12 Dave Jessup 11 David Jackson 10 Glen Baxter 8 Eric Monaghan 5 Richard Green 4 Lee Farthing 0	50 – 46	Eastbourne Eagles Martin Dugard 14 Gordon Kennett 13 Andy Buck 9 Dean Standing 5 Dean Barker 2 Keith Pritchard 2 Darren Standing 1

Mildenhall Stadium

Second leg

4 October 1987

Eastbourne Eagles Dean Standing 11 Andy Buck 11 Gordon Kennett 10 Martin Dugard 9 Dean Barker 6 Keith Pritchard 5 Darren Standing 2	54 – 41	Mildenhall Fen Tigers Melvyn Taylor 12 Dave Jessup 11 David Jackson 11 Richard Green 5 Eric Monaghan 1 Paul Blackbird 1 Glen Baxter 0

Arlington Stadium

Eastbourne were declared Knockout Cup Champions, winning on aggregate 100–91.

== Riders' Championship ==
Andrew Silver won the Riders' Championship. The final sponsored by Jawa Moto & Barum was held on 12 September 1987 at Brandon Stadium.

Pos.	Rider	Pts	Total
1	(England) Andrew Silver	3 3 3 3 3	15
2	(England) Nigel Crabtree	3 3 3 3 2	14
3	(England) David Blackburn	2 2 1 3 2	10+3
4	(England) Les Collins	1 3 3 2 1	10+2
5	(England) David Biles	1 2 2 2 3	10+1
6	(England) Dave Mullett	2 1 2 2 2	9
7	(England) Martin Dixon	3 2 2 1 0	8
8	(England) Dave Jessup	ef 3 3 2 0	8
9	(England) Kevin Jolly	2 0 1 1 3	7
10	(England) Martin Dugard	3 2 0 fr 2	7
11	(England) Trevor Banks	0 1 2 3 0	6
12	(England) Paul Woods	1 1 1 0 3	6
13	(England) Steve Lawson	2 0 0 1 1	4
14	(England) Nigel Sparshott	0 0 1 0 1	2
15	(England) Ian Barney	0 1 0 0 1	2
16	(England) Rob Woffinden	1 tex ef 1 0	2
17	(England) Wayne Broadhurst	r	0

- f=fell, r-retired, ex=excluded, ef=engine failure t-touched tapes

== Pairs ==
The National League Pairs was held at Wimborne Road on 26 July and was won by Mildenhall Fen Tigers.

Semi finals

- Peterborough (Hawkins & Barney) bt Stoke (Crabtree & Stead) 6-3
- Mildenhall (Jessup & Taylor) bt Eastbourne (Kennett & Dugard) 6-3

Final

- Mildenhall bt Peterborough 6-3

== Fours ==
Mildenhall won the fours championship final. The first semi final was held at Peterborough on 9 August but the remaining semi final and final were cancelled due to heavy rain. The re-run was not held until 16 October at Hackney.

Semi finals

- SF1 = Mildenhall 18, Arena Essex 16, Berwick 8, Poole 6
- SF2 = 1 Eastbourne, 2 Wimbledon, 3 Middlesbrough 4 Peterborough

Final

Pos	Team	Pts	Riders
1	Mildenhall Fen Tigers	31	Taylor 10, Monaghan 9, Jackson 6, Jessup 6
2	Arena Essex Hammers	30	Silver 12, Goodwin 10, G Chessell 5 M Chessell 3
3	Eastbourne Eagles	27	Buck 8, Kennett 8, Dean Standing 4, Pritchard 4 Dugard 3
4	Wimbledon Dons	7	Tatum 5, Johns 1 Simpson 1, Jolly 0, Mussett 0

== Leading averages ==
Rider	Team	Average
Andrew Silver	Arena Essex	10.66
Martin Dugard	Eastbourne	10.40
Melvyn Taylor	Mildenhall	10.38
Nigel Crabtree	Stoke	10.20
Martin Dixon	Middlesbrough	10.01
Les Collins	Edinburgh	9.96
Dave Jessup	Mildenhall	9.92
Steve Schofield	Poole	9.54
Kevin Jolly	Wimbledon	9.48
Gordon Kennett	Eastbourne	9.40

== Riders & final averages ==
Arena Essex

- Andrew Silver 10.66
- Martin Goodwin 8.91
- Nigel Leaver 6.76
- Gary Chessell 6.18
- Ian Humphreys 4.55
- Steve Bishop 4.06
- Mark Chessell 2.98
- Lawrie Bloomfield 2.73
- Simon Wolstenholme 2.00

Berwick

- Charlie McKinna 8.08
- Steve McDermott 8.00
- Phil White 7.88
- Rob Woffinden 7.68
- Rob Grant Sr. 6.93
- Ian Stead 6.85
- Wayne Ross 6.45
- Sean Courtney 6.06
- Paul McHale 4.57

Boston (withdrew from league)

- Andy Hines 8.17
- Carl Baldwin 6.35
- Phil White 5.81
- Andy Fisher 4.96
- Wally Hill 3.60
- Jonathan Cooper 3.32
- Gary Clegg 3.29
- Jamie Young 3.27
- Chris Mulvihill 1.75

Canterbury

- Dave Mullett 8.62
- Mike Spink 7.51
- Rob Tilbury 7.15
- Paul Whittaker 6.93
- Paul Evitts 6.33
- Mark Lyndon 5.63
- Richard Pettman 3.95
- Carl Chalcraft 3.76
- Jimmy Goodsell 2.00

Eastbourne

- Martin Dugard 10.40
- Gordon Kennett 9.40
- Andy Buck 8.66
- Dean Standing 7.33
- Keith Pritchard 7.02
- Dean Barker 5.16
- Darren Standing 4.30
- Steve Chambers 4.00

Edinburgh

- Les Collins 9.96
- Doug Wyer 8.40
- Brett Saunders 7.77
- Dave Trownson 6.90
- Chris Cobby 6.15
- Scott Lamb 5.55
- Phil Jeffrey 4.73
- Jamie Young 2.87
- Ray Taaffe 2.82
- Colin Smith 1.00
- Shaun Bickley 0.71

Exeter

- Alan Rivett 7.59
- Colin Cook 7.44
- David Smart 7.43
- Kevin Price 6.81
- Michael Coles 5.09
- Andy Sell 4.66
- Dave Gibbs 4.46
- Tony Mattingley 3.77

Glasgow/Workington (withdrew from league)

- Steve Lawson 8.48
- Gordon Whitaker 7.16
- Martin McKinna 5.35
- Jacko Irving 4.63
- Derek Cooper 3.35
- Geoff Powell 3.10
- Jim Graham 2.59

Long Eaton

- Glenn Doyle 8.50
- Nigel Sparshott 7.72
- Keith White 7.33
- Gerald Short 7.02
- Glyn Taylor 6.14
- Miles Evans 6.00
- Richie Owen 4.78
- Ian Stead 4.00
- Rob Carter 3.52
- Kevin Price 3.31
- Mark Ferry 2.30
- Mark Hepworth 1.84

Middlesbrough

- Martin Dixon 10.01
- Mark Fiora 8.89
- Steve Wilcock 7.56
- Peter McNamara 5.40
- Ashley Norton 5.18
- Andy Buck 4.97
- Mark Burrows 4.38
- Geoff Pusey 4.06

Mildenhall

- Melvyn Taylor 10.38
- Dave Jessup 9.92
- Eric Monaghan 7.90
- Dave Jackson 6.42
- Richard Green 5.91
- Glen Baxter 5.28
- Lee Farthing 4.08
- Rob Parish 3.40

Milton Keynes

- Kevin Smart 8.51
- Trevor Banks 8.48
- Keith White 8.19
- Andy Hines 7.27
- Mark Carlson 6.96
- Troy Butler 6.83
- Peter Lloyd 6.46
- Ian Clark 5.09

Newcastle

- David Blackburn 8.90
- Tom Owen 7.31
- Dave Morton 7.22
- Mark Courtney 7.18
- Gary O'Hare 5.42
- Shane Bowes 4.69
- Bernie Collier 4.67
- Paul Cooper 1.69

Peterborough

- Ian Barney 9.16
- Kevin Hawkins 8.69
- Nigel Flatman 7.63
- Carl Baldwin 7.35
- Craig Hodgson 6.23
- Jamie Habbin 6.17
- Pete Chapman 6.09
- Rob Fortune 5.08

Poole

- Steve Schofield 9.54
- David Biles 9.16
- Martin Yeates 7.66
- Kevin Smith 7.33
- Wayne Barrett 4.08
- Peter Read 3.53
- Will James 3.39
- Nigel Newman 2.90

Rye House

- Paul Woods 8.11
- Barry Thomas 6.93
- Jamie Luckhurst 6.40
- Kevin Brice 5.10
- Linden Warner 4.99
- Kevin Teager 4.81
- Gary Rolls 4.44
- Rob Parish 4.15
- Steve Bryenton 4.00
- Julian Parr 3.51

Stoke

- Nigel Crabtree 10.20
- Darren Sumner 8.03
- Graham Jones 7.94
- Paul Stead 7.38
- Mike Wilding 6.34
- Derek Richardson 5.16
- Bobby Duncan 3.71

Wimbledon

- Kevin Jolly 9.48
- Roger Johns 9.02
- Neville Tatum 8.56
- Jeremy Luckhurst 6.06
- Alan Farmer 5.27
- Terry Mussett 5.00
- Nathan Simpson 4.36
- Mark Fordham 3.79
- Mark Lyndon 3.46

== See also ==
- List of United Kingdom Speedway League Champions
- Knockout Cup (speedway)
