= 1971 British Speedway Championship =

Speedway event

- Venue: Brandon Stadium, Coventry
- Start date: 16 June 1971

The 1971 British Speedway Championship was the 11th edition of the British Speedway Championship. The final took place on 16 June at Brandon Stadium in Coventry, England. The Championship was won by Ivan Mauger.

The British Under 21 Championship was won by Ian Turner.

== British Final ==
- 16 June 1971, Brandon Stadium, Coventry

Placing	Rider	Total	1	2	3	4	5	6	7	8	9	10	11	12	13	14	15	16	17	18	19	20	Pts	Pos
1	(New Zealand) (7) Ivan Mauger	14		3					3					3	3					2			14	1
2	(New Zealand) (2) Barry Briggs	13	3					2				2				3				3			13	2
3	(England) (6) Tony Lomas	12		0				3			3							3			3		12	3
4	(Scotland) (16) Bert Harkins	9				2				2	2						3			0			9	4
5	(England) (15) Ray Wilson	8				3			1			3						1	0				8	5
6	(England) (5) Martin Ashby	8		2			2					1					1					2	8	6
7	(New Zealand) (9) Ronnie Moore	7			1		0						3					2		1			7	7
8	(England) (13) Dave Younghusband	7				0	3							1		2					1		7	8
9	(England) (11) Bob Kilby	7			2				2		1					1						1	7	9
10	(England) (4) Eric Boocock	6	0							3				0				T				3	6	10
11	(Australia) (12) Jim Airey	6			3					1		0			2						0		6	11
12	(England) (8) Nigel Boocock	6		1						X			2			0			3				6	12
13	(Wales) (10) Howard Cole	6			0			1						2			2		1				6	13
14	(Australia) (1) Geoff Curtis	6	2				1				0				1				2				6	14
15	(Australia) (3) John Boulger	4	1						0				1				0				2		4	15
16	(England) (14) Arnold Haley	1				1		0					0		0							0	1	16
	(New Zealand) (17) Bill Andrew	0																0					0	
	(Australia) (18) Garry Middleton	0																					0	
Placing	Rider	Total	1	2	3	4	5	6	7	8	9	10	11	12	13	14	15	16	17	18	19	20	Pts	Pos

m - exclusion for exceeding two minute time allowance • t - exclusion for touching the tapes • x - other exclusion • e - retired or mechanical failure • f - fell • ns - non-starter • nc - non-classify

gate A - inside	gate B	gate C	gate D - outside

== British Under 21 final ==
- 14 July 1971, Abbey Stadium, Swindon

Pos	Rider	Pts
1	Ian Turner	15
2	Dave Jessup	14
3	Peter Ingram	11
4	Malcolm Shakespeare	10
5	Tony Davey	9
6	Malcolm Ballard	8
7	Doug Wyer	8
8	Jimmy Gallacher	8
9	Geoff Bouchard	7
10	Gordon Kennett	7
11	John Jackson	5
12	Peter Collins	5
13	Alan Wilkinson	4
14	Malcolm Mackay	3
15	Paul Tyrer	2
16	Graham Banks	2
17	Richard Greer (res)	1
18	Alistair Brady (res)	0

== See also ==
- British Speedway Championship
