= 1970 British Speedway Championship =

Speedway event

- Venue: West Ham Stadium, London
- Start date: 9 June 1970

The 1970 British Speedway Championship was the 10th edition of the British Speedway Championship. The final took place on 9 June at West Ham Stadium in London, England. The Championship was won by Ivan Mauger.

The British Under 21 Championship was won by Barry Thomas.

== British Final ==
- 9 June 1970, West Ham Stadium, London

Placing	Rider	Total	1	2	3	4	5	6	7	8	9	10	11	12	13	14	15	16	17	18	19	20	Pts	Pos
1	(New Zealand) (13) Ivan Mauger	14				2	3							3		3					3		14	1
2	(New Zealand) (4) Ronnie Moore	13	3							3				2				2				3	13	2
3	(New Zealand) (3) Roy Trigg	12+3	1						3				3				3				2		12	3
4	(England) (2) Arnold Haley	12+2	2					3				3				2				2			12	4
5	(New Zealand) (6) Barry Briggs	10		3				0			3							3			1		10	5
6	(England) (16) Trevor Hedge	9				3				1	2						2			1			9	6
7	(Australia) (7) Jim Airey	8		0					1					1	3					3			8	7
8	(Australia) (14) John Boulger	8				1		2					1		2							2	8	8
9	(England) (11) Nigel Boocock	7			3				2		0					1						1	7	9
10	(England) (12) Chris Pusey	6			2					2		2			0						0		6	10
11	(Australia) (1) Charlie Monk	5	0				2				1				1				1				5	11
12	(England) (8) Martin Ashby	5		1						0			2			0			2				5	12
13	(England) (10) Ray Wilson	5			0			1						0			1		3				5	13
14	(Wales) (5) Howard Cole	2		2			0					0					0					0	2	14
15	(England) (9) Terry Betts	2			1		1						0					0		X			2	15
16	(Scotland) (15) Jim McMillan	2				0			0			1						1	0				2	16
	(England) (17) Bob Kilby	0																					0	
	(England) (18) Tommy Roper	0																					0	
Placing	Rider	Total	1	2	3	4	5	6	7	8	9	10	11	12	13	14	15	16	17	18	19	20	Pts	Pos

m - exclusion for exceeding two minute time allowance • t - exclusion for touching the tapes • x - other exclusion • e - retired or mechanical failure • f - fell • ns - non-starter • nc - non-classify

gate A - inside	gate B	gate C	gate D - outside

== British Under 21 final ==
- 19 August 1970, Abbey Stadium, Swindon

Pos	Rider	Pts
1	Barry Thomas	14+3
2	Dave Jessup	14+2
3	Mick Bell	13
4	John Jackson	11
5	Bobby Beaton	11
6	Malcolm Shakespeare	10
7	Graham Miles	8
8	Ian Turner	7
9	Graham Banks	7
10	Gordon Kennett	6
11	Paul Tyrer	4
12	Alan Bridgett	3
13	Sid Sheldrick	3
14	Malcolm Mackay (res)	3
15	George Devonport	2
16	Shawn Murtough (res)	2
17	Mac Woolford (res)	1
18	Steve Waplington	0
19	Barry Duke	0

== See also ==
- British Speedway Championship
