= 1969 British Speedway Championship =

Speedway event

- Venue: West Ham Stadium, London
- Start date: 5 August 1969

The 1969 British Speedway Championship was the ninth edition of the British Speedway Championship. The final took place on 5 August 1969 at West Ham Stadium in London, England. The Championship was won by Barry Briggs.

The British Under 21 Championship was won by Graham Plant.

== British Final ==
- 9 June 1969, West Ham Stadium, London

Placing	Rider	Total	1	2	3	4	5	6	7	8	9	10	11	12	13	14	15	16	17	18	19	20	Pts	Pos	21
1	(New Zealand) (9) Barry Briggs	15			3		3						3					3		3			15	1	
2	(England) (3) Nigel Boocock	13	3						3				2				3				2		13	2	3
3	(New Zealand) (6) Ronnie Moore	13		3				2			3							2			3		13	3	2
4	(New Zealand) (2) Ivan Mauger	11	0					3				3				3				2			11	4	
5	(Scotland) (4) Ken McKinlay	11	2							3				2				1				3	11	5	
6	(Wales) (11) Howard Cole	9			2				1		2					2						2	9	6	
7	(England) (16) Arnold Haley	8				3				2	1						2			X			8	7	3
8	(England) (7) Eric Boocock	8		1					2					1	3					1			8	8	2
9	(Australia) (13) Garry Middleton	8				2	2							3		1					T		8	9	1
10	(Australia) (10) Charlie Monk	6			1			1						0			1		3				6	10	
11	(England) (8) Martin Ashby	4		0						1			1			X			2				4	11	
12	(England) (5) Trevor Hedge	4		2			1					1					0					0	4	12	
13	(Scotland) (14) Jim McMillan	4				1		0					0		2							1	4	13	
14	(England) (15) Colin Pratt	3				E			T			2						0	1				3	14	
15	(England) (1) Ray Wilson	3	1				F				1				1				0				3	15	
16	(England) (12) Roy Trigg	1			0					E		0			0						1		1	16	
R1	(England) (R1) James Bond	0							0														0	R1	
R2	(England) (R2) Clive Hitch	0																					0	R2	
R3	(England) (R3) Martin Ashby	0																					0	R3	
Placing	Rider	Total	1	2	3	4	5	6	7	8	9	10	11	12	13	14	15	16	17	18	19	20	Pts	Pos	21

m - exclusion for exceeding two minute time allowance • t - exclusion for touching the tapes • x - other exclusion • e - retired or mechanical failure • f - fell • ns - non-starter • nc - non-classify

gate A - inside	gate B	gate C	gate D - outside

== British Under 21 final ==
- 2 October 1969, Wimbledon Stadium, London

Pos	Rider	Heats	SF	F
1	Graham Plant	3	x	3
2	Geoff Ambrose	3	x	2
3	Mick Bell	3	x	1
4	Martyn Piddock	2	3	0
5	Bobby Beaton	1	2	x
6	Ian Turner	2	1	x
7	Phil Pratt	2	0	x
8	Ray Carter	1	x	x
9	Malcolm Shakespeare	1	x	x

== See also ==
- British Speedway Championship
