= 1976 British Speedway Championship =

Speedway event

- Venue: Brandon Stadium, Coventry
- Start date: 2 June 1976

The 1976 British Speedway Championship was the 16th edition of the British Speedway Championship. The Final took place on 2 June at Brandon Stadium in Coventry, England. The Championship was won by Malcolm Simmons.

The British Under 21 Championship was won by Michael Lee.

== British Final ==
- 2 June 1976, Brandon Stadium, Coventry

Placing	Rider	Total	1	2	3	4	5	6	7	8	9	10	11	12	13	14	15	16	17	18	19	20	Pts	Pos
1	(England) (9) Malcolm Simmons	15			3		3						3					3		3			15	1
2	(England) (3) Chris Morton	13	2						3				2				3				3		13	2
3	(England) (6) Doug Wyer	13		3				3			3							2			2		13	3
4	(England) (12) Peter Collins	12			2					3		3			3						1		12	4
5	(England) (5) John Louis	11		2			2					2					2					3	11	5
6	(England) (7) Dave Jessup	10		1					2					3	2					2			10	6
7	(Scotland) (2) Jim McMillan	8	3					1				1				3				0			8	7
8	(England) (15) Terry Betts	7				3			1			0						0	3				7	8
9	(England) (13) Ray Wilson	5				2	1							0		2					0		5	9
10	(England) (11) Bob Kilby	5			1				0		2					1						1	5	10
11	(England) (16) John Davis	5				0				2	1						1			1			5	11
12	(England) (10) Dave Morton	4			0			2						2			0		0				4	12
13	(Scotland) (14) George Hunter	4				1		0					0		1							2	4	13
14	(England) (1) Mike Lanham	3	1				0				0				0				2				3	14
15	(England) (4) Reg Wilson	3	0							1				1				1				0	3	15
16	(England) (8) Chris Pusey	2		0						0			1			0			1				2	16
R1	(England) (R1) John Harrhy	0																					0	R1
Placing	Rider	Total	1	2	3	4	5	6	7	8	9	10	11	12	13	14	15	16	17	18	19	20	Pts	Pos

m - exclusion for exceeding two minute time allowance • t - exclusion for touching the tapes • x - other exclusion • e - retired or mechanical failure • f - fell • ns - non-starter • nc - non-classify

gate A - inside	gate B	gate C	gate D - outside

== British Under 21 final ==
- 25 September 1976, Kingsmead Stadium, Canterbury

Pos	Rider	Pts
1	Michael Lee	15
2	Steve Weatherley	14
3	Colin Richardson	12+3
4	Graham Clifton	12+2
5	Steve Finch	11
6	Les Collins	10
7	Karl Fiala	8
8	Kevin Jolly	8
9	Andy Hines	7
10	Andy Cusworth	6
11	Jim Brett	3
12	Paul Gilbert	3
13	Gerald Purkiss	3
14	Mick Bates	3
15	Bob Garrad	3
16	Trevor Whiting	2
17	Alan Diprose (res)	0

== See also ==
- British Speedway Championship
