= 1973 British Speedway Championship =

Speedway event

- Venue: Brandon Stadium, Coventry
- Start date: 21 June 1973

The 1973 British Speedway Championship was the 13th edition of the British Speedway Championship. The final took place on 21 June at Brandon Stadium in Coventry, England. The Championship was won by Ray Wilson.

The British Under 21 Championship was won by Peter Collins.

== British Final ==
- 21 June 1973, Brandon Stadium, Coventry

Placing	Rider	Total	1	2	3	4	5	6	7	8	9	10	11	12	13	14	15	16	17	18	19	20	Pts	Pos	21
1	(England) (15) Ray Wilson	15				3			3			3						3	3				15	1	
2	(Australia) (10) Bob Valentine	12			3			3						2			2		2				12	2	3
3	(England) (13) Peter Collins	12				2	3							3		2					2		12	3	2
4	(Australia) (3) John Boulger	12	2						1				3				3				3		12	4	1
5	(New Zealand) (2) Ivan Mauger	10	3					1				3				3				T			10	5	
6	(England) (7) Eric Boocock	9		2					2					0	3					2			9	6	
7	(England) (8) Tony Davey	9		3						2			2			1			1				9	7	
8	(England) (16) Rick France	9				1				2	2						1			3			9	8	
9	(England) (6) John Louis	7		F				0			3							3			1		7	9	
10	(England) (4) Martin Ashby	6	1							3				1				1				0	6	10	
11	(Australia) (5) Garry Middleton	5		1			0					1					0					3	5	11	
12	(England) (14) Peter Smith	5				0		2					1		1							1	5	12	
13	(England) (9) Terry Betts	4			1		2						F					F		1			4	13	
14	(England) (11) Mick Bell	4			2				0		0					0						2	4	14	
15	(England) (1) Malcolm Simmons	2	0				1				1				0				0				2	15	
16	(Scotland) (12) Jim McMillan	2			0					0		0			2						0		2	16	
R1	(England) (R1) Chris Pusey	0																					0	R1	
Placing	Rider	Total	1	2	3	4	5	6	7	8	9	10	11	12	13	14	15	16	17	18	19	20	Pts	Pos	21

m - exclusion for exceeding two minute time allowance • t - exclusion for touching the tapes • x - other exclusion • e - retired or mechanical failure • f - fell • ns - non-starter • nc - non-classify

gate A - inside	gate B	gate C	gate D - outside

== British Under 21 final ==
- 16 June 1973, Kingsmead Stadium, Canterbury

Pos	Rider	Pts
1	Peter Collins	13
2	Barney Kennett	13
3	David Gagen	12
4	Dave Piddock	11
5	Ian Hindle	9
6	Bobby McNeil	8
7	Paul Gachet	8
8	John Davis	7
9	Carl Glover	7
10	Colin Meredith	6
11	Trevor Geer	6
12	Les Rumsey	5
13	Terry Barclay	4
14	Tim Ballard	3
15	Peter Cairns	3
16	Eric Dugard	2
17	Keith White (res)	0

== See also ==
- British Speedway Championship
