= 1974 British Speedway Championship =

Speedway event

- Venue: Brandon Stadium, Coventry
- Start date: 12 June 1974

The 1974 British Speedway Championship was the 14th edition of the British Speedway Championship. The Final took place on 12 June at Brandon Stadium in Coventry, England. The Championship was won by Eric Boocock.

The British Under 21 Championship was won by Chris Morton.

== British Final ==
- 12 June 1974, Brandon Stadium, Coventry

Placing	Rider	Total	1	2	3	4	5	6	7	8	9	10	11	12	13	14	15	16	17	18	19	20	Pts	Pos	21
1	(England) (14) Eric Boocock	13				3		3					2		2							3	13	1	
2	(England) (11) Terry Betts	12			3				3		2					2						2	12	2	
3	(England) (8) Dave Jessup	11		3						1			3			1			3				11	3	
4	(Australia) (5) John Boulger	10		2			3					3					2					0	10	4	
5	(New Zealand) (13) Ivan Mauger	9				2	E							3		3					1		9	5	
6	(England) (1) Nigel Boocock	8	2				2				0				3				1				8	6	
7	(Scotland) (7) Jim McMillan	8		1					2					1	1					3			8	7	
8	(England) (12) Peter Collins	8			0					3		2			0						3		8	8	
9	(England) (16) John Louis	8				0				0	3						3			2			8	9	
10	(England) (4) Ray Wilson	7	1							2				T				3				1	7	10	
11	(New Zealand) (6) Barry Briggs	6		0				1			1							2			2		6	11	
12	(Australia) (10) Billy Sanders	5			1			2						1			1		0				5	12	
13	(England) (15) Malcolm Simmons	5				1			E			1						1	2				5	13	
14	(England) (9) Reg Wilson	4			2		1						X					F		1			4	14	
15	(Australia) (2) Bob Valentine	3	3					X				F				E				-			3	15	
16	(England) (3) Martin Ashby	2	0						1				1				0				0		2	16	
R1	(England) (R1) Frank Smith	0												0									0	R1	
R2	(England) (R2) Roger Hill	0																		0			0	R2	
Placing	Rider	Total	1	2	3	4	5	6	7	8	9	10	11	12	13	14	15	16	17	18	19	20	Pts	Pos	21

m - exclusion for exceeding two minute time allowance • t - exclusion for touching the tapes • x - other exclusion • e - retired or mechanical failure • f - fell • ns - non-starter • nc - non-classify

gate A - inside	gate B	gate C	gate D - outside

== British Under 21 final ==
- 29 June 1974, Kingsmead Stadium, Canterbury

Pos	Rider	Pts
1	Chris Morton	15
2	Steve Bastable	13
3	Neil Middleditch	12
4	Keith White	10
5	Andy Sims	10
6	Ian Cartwright	9
7	Eric Dugard	7
8	Robert Hollingworth	7
9	Wayne Hughes	7
10	Joe Owen	6
11	Les Rumsey	6
12	Ian Hindle	5
13	Steve Weatherley	5
14	Nigel Wasley	4
15	Martin Yeates	3
16	Paul Gachet	1
17	Russell Foot (res)	0

== See also ==
- British Speedway Championship
