= 2026 British Speedway Championship =

Medalists
gold medal	Robert Lambert
silver medal	Charles Wright
bronze medal	Leon Flint

The 2026 British Speedway Championship was the 66th edition of the British Speedway Championship. Robert Lambert was the defending champion, having won the title in 2025.

The competition consisted of one semi-final and a final. The semi-final was held at Beaumont Park Stadium, Leicester, on Sunday 19 July. The final was held at the National Speedway Stadium in Manchester on Saturday 15 August. and was once again won by Lambert. He beat Charles Wright, Leon Flint and Cooper Rushen in the final. Wright secured his place as wildcard for the 2027 British Speedway Grand Prix by finishing second.

The British Under 21 final was held on 7 June in Redcar and was won by Cooper Rushen. He defeated Jody Scott, Ace Pijper and William Cairns in the final.

The British Under 19 final was held on 19 September in Plymouth and was won by Jody Scott. He scored a 15-point maximum.

== Results ==
=== The final ===
- (England) National Speedway Stadium, Manchester
- 15 August 2026

Pos.	Rider	Heat scores	Points	SF	Final
1	Robert Lambert	3,3,3,3,3	15	-	3
2	Charles Wright	2,3,2,3,1	11	-	2
3	Leon Flint	3,3,3,1,0	10	2	1
4	Cooper Rushen	2,2,3,1,2	10	3	0
5	Dan Thompson	2,2,2,2,2	10	1	
6	Anders Rowe	1,2,1,2,3	9	0	
7	Tom Brennan	1,0,3,1,3	8		
8	Adam Ellis	3,1,2,0,2	8		
9	Danny King	3,0,2,2,0	7		
10	Ace Pijper	0,1,1,3,2	7		
11	Chris Harris	2,2,0,2,1	7		
12	Jason Edwards	0,3,0,1,1	5		
13	William Cairns	1,0,1,3,0	5		
14	Drew Kemp	0,1,0,0,3	4		
15	Jake Mulford	1,1,1,0,0	3		
16	Jody Scott	0,0,0,0,1	1		

=== Under 21 final ===
- (England) Ecco Arena, Redcar
- 7 June 2026

Pos.	Rider	Heat scores	Points	SF	Final
1	Cooper Rushen	3,2,3,1,3	12	-	3
2	Jody Scott	1,3,2,3,2	11	2	2
3	Ace Pijper	3,3,2,0,3	11	3	1
4	William Cairns	3,2,3,3,1	12	-	0
5	Jordy Loftus ( (Australia) )	2,2,3,2,2	11	1	
6	Max Perry	3,3,F,2,2	10	0	
7	Vinnie Foord	2,1,2,2,3	10		
8	Luke Harrison	2,R,3,0,3	8		
9	Freddy Hodder	2,0,X,3,1	6		
10	Ryan Ingram	1,3,1,0,1	6		
11	Ollie Binns	1,1,2,0,2	6		
12	Charlie Southwick	F,1,2,1,2	6		
13	Stene Pijper (res)	-,2,1,-,0	3		
14	Harry Fletcher	R,F,2,1,0	2		
15	Seth Norman	0,R,1,2,0	2		
16	Lee Harrison (res)	-,-,1,1,-	2		
17	Senna Summers	1,F,-,-,0	1		
18	Harry Sadler	1,F,F,R,-	0		

=== Under 19 final ===
- (England) Plymouth Coliseum, Plymouth
- 19 September 2026

Pos.	Rider	Heat scores	Points
1	Jody Scott	3,3,3,3,3	15
2	Cooper Rushen	3,3,3,3,2	14
3	Luke Harrison	3,3,2,2,3	13
4	William Cairns	3,2,3,1,3	12
5	Ryan Ingram	2,2,1,3,2	10
6	Jordy Loftus ( (Australia) )	2,1,3,2,2	10
7	Ashton Vale	1,3,1,3,1	9
8	Stene Pijper	0,1,2,1,3	7
9	Seth Norman	2,1,0,2,0	5
10	Charlie Southwick	2,2,0,1,X	5
11	Ollie Binns	1,0,1,2,1	5
12	Liam Greens	1,0,2,1,F	4
13	Casper Kluczniak	F,2,1,0,0	3
14	Harry Fletcher	1,F,2,0,F	3
15	Anika Loftus ( (Australia) )	0,1,0,0,0	1
16	Emerson Betty	R,0,0,0,1	1
