= Allan Emmett =

English speedway rider

- Born: 3 July 1952 (age 74); Edmonton, London
- Nationality: British (English)

Career history

Great Britain
- 1970–1973: Rayleigh Rockets
- 1972–1974: Hackney Hawks
- 1974: Rye House Rockets

Individual honours
- 1972: British Under 21 champion

Allan G. Emmett (born 3 July 1952) is a former motorcycle speedway rider from England.

== Career ==
Emmett made his British leagues debut during the 1970 British League Division Two season, when he rode for Rayleigh Rockets.

The following season in 1971, while still riding for Rayleigh, Emmett improved his average significantly. On 24 June 1972, he won the gold medal at the British Speedway Under 21 Championship, held at Kingsmead Stadium in Canterbury. He was a heat leader with Rayleigh.

Emmett represented the England national speedway team in against Australasia in 1972.
