= Robert Lightfoot (speedway rider) =

- Born: 16 July 1963 (age 63); Coventry, England
- Nationality: British (English)

Career history
- 1979–1982: Stoke Potters
- 1980–1983: Leicester Lions

Individual honours
- 1981: British Junior Champion

Robert James Lightfoot (often known as Rob Lightfoot, born 16 July 1963) is a British former grasstrack and motorcycle speedway rider.

== Biography ==
Born in Coventry, Lightfoot is the son of Jim Lightfoot, who also had a career in speedway, riding for Coventry Bees and Long Eaton Archers. He initially excelled as a junior grasstrack rider, winning several tournaments including the Welsh Open Championship (1979–1980), the Sportac Spectacular (1978), and the Worcester and Cotswold Club Championship (1979).

Lightfoot began his speedway career in 1979, making his debut for Stoke Potters later that year. In 1980 he signed for Leicester Lions, riding in two inter-league cup matches, and was loaned back to Stoke, for whom he rode in 20 National League matches that year, averaging 3.39. He also rode in Leicester's junior team in the Anglia Junior League, and won the Anglia Junior League Riders' Championship in 1980. In 1981 he won the British Junior Championship at Canterbury, the 1981 'Pride of the Potteries', and averaged over 6.5 for Stoke on the National League.

Lightfoot's career was interrupted in 1982 by a crash in which he broke his neck. On his return in 1983, he rode in second-half races at Leicester, and made a handful of senior appearances for the Lions, but a string of crashes took their toll and he retired at the end of the 1983 season.
