= Neil Collins (speedway rider) =

British motorcycle speedway rider

- Born: 15 October 1961 (age 65); Manchester, England
- Nationality: British (English)

Career history
- 1978: Ellesmere Port Gunners
- 1979: Nottingham Outlaws
- 1979, 2001: Workington Comets
- 1979–1980, 1984–1988, 1995: Sheffield Tigers
- 1980–1981: Edinburgh Monarchs
- 1981, 1996, 2001, 2003: Belle Vue Aces
- 1982–1983: Leicester Lions
- 1989–1990: Wolverhampton Wolves
- 1992, 1997: Glasgow Tigers
- 1993-1994: Long Eaton Invaders
- 1998: Stoke Potters
- 1999–2000: Swindon Robins
- 2002, 2004: Somerset Rebels
- 2003: Hull Vikings
- 2005–2006: Newport Wasps

Individual honours
- 1981: Grand National Winner

Team honours
- 1981, 2000: NL/PL Knockout Cup
- 1981, 2001: NL/PL Fours
- 2000: Young Shield

Neil Jeffrey Collins (born 15 October 1961 in Manchester, England) is a former motorcycle speedway rider from England.

== Career ==
Collins started his British leagues career with Ellesmere Port Gunners during the 1978 National League season. The very next season in 1979, he rode in the top tier of speedway for the Sheffield Tigers and doubled up the following season with the Edinburgh Monarchs in tier 2. He won his first silverware during the 1981 National League season, winning the Knockout Cup and helping the Monarchs win the Fours Championship.

After two seasons with Leicester Lions, Collins returned to Sheffield in 1984, which turned out to be the season when Collins won a silver medal with the England national speedway team, after finishing runner-up in the World Team Cup final. He remained at Sheffield for five more seasons before signing for in Wolverhampton Wolves in 1989. After Wolves he became a bit of a journeyman rider, appearing for multiple clubs but he remained a solid rider with a reliable average for most teams he rode for. In 1999 he joined Swindon Robins and the following season won the 2000 Knockout Cup and Young Shield.

Collins' final two seasons with Newport Wasps still saw him riding with an average of 7.45 and 6.88 respectively. In 2007, which would have been his thirtieth season he could not find a team place by the start of the season, largely due to the reduction in the points limit for team building purposes. Left without a club he decided to retire after 29 years in the sport. When Neil retired he had broken the record for domestic appearances (1,132) in British Speedway, overtaking the record previously held by his brother Les Collins (1,084). He had also reached eight British finals and earned 19 international caps for the England.

== Family ==
Collins has four brothers all of whom were speedway riders, Peter, Phil, Les and Stephen. His nephews Aidan and Chris were also riders but have both retired from the sport.

Married to wife Annette, they have two children, Louis and Hannah.

== World Final appearances ==
=== World Team Cup ===
- 1984 - (Poland) Leszno, Alfred Smoczyk Stadium (with Chris Morton / Peter Collins / Simon Wigg / Phil Collins) - 2nd - 24pts (2)
