= Roy Trigg =

British speedway rider

- Born: 29 April 1943 (age 83); Morden, Surrey, England
- Nationality: British (English)

Career history
- 1961: New Cross Rangers
- 1961–1964: Wimbledon Dons
- 1962: Poole Pirates
- 1964–1966: Hackney Hawks
- 1967: Oxford Cheetahs
- 1968–1972: Cradley Heathens
- 1973–1974: Newport

Individual honours
- 1966, 1969, 1970: Victorian State Champion (Aust)

Team honours
- 1962: Provincial League Champion
- 1962: Provincial Southern League Champion
- 1974: Spring Gold Cup Winner

Roy Richard Trigg (born 29 April 1943, in Morden, Surrey) is a former motorcycle speedway rider from England. He earned 31 international caps for the England national speedway team and five caps for the Great Britain team.

== Career ==
Trigg was noticed as a teenager by the Wimbledon Dons management who signed him up but immediately loaned him out to lower league Poole Pirates. In 1963 he was recalled by his parent team Wimbledon Dons. In 1964 the new Hackney Hawks promoter Len Silver signed him on a full transfer. He stayed with the Hawks for two seasons but was forced out of the team when Bengt Jansson was signed.

After leaving the Hackney, Trigg spent a season with the Oxford Cheetahs before moving on to Cradley Heath where he spent the next five seasons. It was with Cradley he was threatened with a gun by Garry Middleton. Middleton tried to forcefully dive under Trigg but Trigg saw him and slowed down, leaving Middleton to shoot straight past him into the safety fence. Middleton then went into the pits into his toolbox and pulled out a handgun. He had to be dragged from the pits to avoid further trouble.

After being called into the England team during July 1968 as a late replacement, Trigg played a pivotal part in the win against the Soviet Union.

In 1970, Trigg finished third in the British Speedway Championship final. For the last two seasons of his career, he rode with Newport.

After he finished his British career, Trigg emigrated to New Zealand. He rode as a New Zealander in the inaugural Australasian Final in 1976. He finished in 15th place with two points.
