= Kenny Carter =

British speedway rider

- Born: 28 March 1961; Halifax, England
- Died: 21 May 1986 (aged 25); Halifax, England
- Nationality: British (English)

Career history
- 1978: Newcastle Diamonds
- 1978–1985: Halifax Dukes
- 1986: Bradford Dukes

Individual honours
- 1984, 1985: British Champion
- 1981, 1982: British League Riders' Champion
- 1979: British Junior Champion
- 1980,1981: Dews Trophy
- 1981: Golden Gala Italy
- 1981: Northern Riders' Championship
- 1981: Star of Anglia
- 1982: Second City Trophy
- 1982, 1985: Golden Hammer
- 1983: Brandonapolis
- 1983: Golden Gaunlets
- 1983, 1985: Daily Mirror/Weslake 16-Lapper

Team honours
- 1983: World Pairs Champion
- 1980: Northern Trophy

Kenneth Malcolm Carter (28 March 1961 – 21 May 1986), was a British motorcycle speedway rider. He was a World Pairs champion and British champion. On Wednesday, 21 May 1986, he shot dead his wife, Pam, and then killed himself, orphaning their two young children in the process.

== Career ==
Carter was born in Halifax, West Yorkshire. He started his career in Britain doubling up for Halifax Dukes during the 1978 British League season and the Newcastle Diamonds during the 1978 National League season. In 1979, he won the British Speedway Under 21 Championship and enjoyed a solid season for Halifax, averaging 8.13.

In 1980, Carter topped the Halifax team averages and represented them in the British League Riders' Championship.

Carter took on six-time World Champion Ivan Mauger as his manager in 1981, who set him up with a Weslake bike. This new regime would bear fruit and this would prove to be Carter’s breakthrough season. He recorded the second highest league average of 10.17, only behind world champion Bruce Penhall. He qualified for the British Final for the first time and surprised many by finishing joint top scorer on the night, before losing the run-off for the title to Swindon’s Steve Bastable. He was chosen to represent his country in that year’s World Team Cup Final in Germany, where he would score nine points as England finished runners-up to Denmark. Carter’s year would culminate by reaching the final of the 1981 Individual Speedway World Championship, held in front of 92,500 fans at Wembley Stadium. He finished the night as top Briton in fifth, although he had been in strong contention for a rostrum place until a mechanical failure in his fourth ride. He capped a successful year by winning the British League Riders' Championship, held at Hyde Road on 17 October 1981.

Carter's good form continued into 1982, topping the British League averages for Halifax, and succuessfully defending his British League Rider’s Championship, scoring a 15 point maximum. He had been the favourite to claim the British Title, but finished third behind Andy and Alan Grahame. Throughout the year Carter had developed a heated rivalry with defending world champion Bruce Penhall, defined by a number of on-track clashes for both club and country.

Carter would again qualify for the World Final, which was held for the first time on Penhall’s home soil in Los Angeles. Both he and Penhall were viewed as the main contenders for that year’s title. Carter won his first three rides, and was leading the classification at that stage, one point ahead of Penhall. Their meeting in heat 14 would prove both decisive and controversial. Both riders fought aggressively for third place after bad starts. On lap 3, Penhall drew to the inside of Carter in the first bend, the pair then attempted to go side-by-side through bend 2 onto the back straight, but Carter fell and went underneath the retaining fence. From the outside, it appeared Penhall had initiated contact which had caused the fall, but the referee Torrie Kittlesen decided there had been no contact and Carter was excluded from the heat as the cause of the race stoppage. A furious Carter then appealed to the referee by phone in front of the watching TV cameras, but failed to change his mind. He then told Kittlesen that his decision had cost him the World Championship. Following this, Carter walked onto the track and stood at the starting tapes in an attempt to prevent the re-run heat going ahead without him, with most of the 40,000 strong crowd at the Los Angeles Coliseum (who were firmly behind home town hero Penhall) booing him loudly. Carter then had to be physically removed from the track by security personnel and his manager Ivan Mauger. Carter would end the night in fifth place, whilst Penhall went on to win the title before announcing his retirement on the podium. Meanwhile video camera footage from various sources proved Carter had not been touched by Penhall when he fell and the referee was, in fact, correct in his exclusion of Carter. This was also corroborated by Mauger who later admitted he was 'embarrassed' at his involvement in Carter's unwarranted protests and also of the comments made to Kittelsen.

In 1983, Carter became the World Pairs Champion with Peter Collins. He would once agin be unsuccessful in his world championship bid, finishing fifth again (for the third successive year) during the 1983 Individual Speedway World Championship at Norden in West Germany.

Carter's 1984 season was thrown into jeapordy when Carter broke his leg in April. He was expected to be out for several months and forgo his world title hopes for another year. But Carter would stun everyone by qualifying for the British Final, competing in the semi-final with his leg in plaster and having to be carried to and from his bike. In the Final itself, heavy rain saw many of the established riders label track conditions as unsafe and push for the meeting to be postponed. Carter however campaigned heavily for the meeting to go ahead, and reportedly clashed with his competitors in the dressing room over his outspoken opinions. The meeting would eventually go ahead, and in what was viewed as the finest moment of his career, Carter would finally claim his first British title, still wearing a protective boot and walking on crutches. Although this achievement increased his popularity with the fans, it further strained an already frosty relationship with his England colleagues. It would come at a cost however, the fitness of his leg worsened through the summer and he dropped out of the World Championship at the Intercontinental Final stage.

1985 brought similar disappointment. Carter successfully defended his British Title by scoring a 15 point maximum. He was widely tipped to finally claim the World Title, which was to be held at Odsal Stadium in Bradford just 11 miles from his home. But fate would intervene once again, he was injured in a crash in the Intercontinental Final in Sweden and failed to qualify for the second year running.

At the end of that season, Halifax were evicted from The Shay due to rising rent costs, so for the following year Carter and the club moved to neighbouring Bradford. His 1986 season started with controversy. He was due to appear before the Speedway Control Bureau for assaulting England colleague Peter Collins, following a clash during a league match against the Belle Vue Aces. As a result of this misdemeanour he lost the England captaincy. Away from the track Kenny had split from his wife Pam, and she was in the process of applying for divorce and full custody of their children, citing his controlling behaviour as the main reason.

On the 21 May 1986, Carter was in residence at his and Pamela’s home at Grey Horse Farm, Bradshaw, whilst she was residing elsewhere. Carter convinced Pamela he would be out and that she could safely attend the property to get possessions for herself and their children, however he, apparently, hid his van in a barn and waited. When the unsuspecting Pamela entered the property Carter shot her (allegedly shooting her again as she attempted to flee), before returning indoors and turning the gun on himself and taking his own life in the process.

Carter was the older brother of Grand Prix motorcycle road racer Alan Carter.

== World Final Appearances ==
=== Individual World Championship ===
- 1981 – (England) London, Wembley Stadium – 5th – 11pts
- 1982 – (United States) Los Angeles, Memorial Coliseum – 5th – 10pts
- 1983 – (Germany) Norden, Motodrom Halbemond – 5th – 10pts

=== World Pairs Championship ===
- 1982 – (Australia) Sydney, Liverpool City Raceway (with Peter Collins) – 2nd – 22pts (7)
- 1983 – (Sweden) Gothenburg, Ullevi (with Peter Collins) – Winner – 25pts (15)
- 1985 – (Poland) Rybnik, Rybnik Municipal Stadium (with Kelvin Tatum) – 2nd – 27pts (14)

=== World Team Cup ===
- 1981 – (West Germany) Olching, Speedway Stadion Olching (with Dave Jessup / Chris Morton / John Davis / Gordon Kennett) – 2nd – 29pts (9)
- 1983 – (Denmark) Vojens, Speedway Center (with Michael Lee / Dave Jessup / Chris Morton / Peter Collins) – 2nd – 29pts (8)
