= Roger Johns =

English speedway rider

- Born: 1 March 1954 (age 72); Epsom, Surrey, England
- Nationality: British (English)

Career history
- 1970–1973: Eastbourne Eagles
- 1971, 1973, 1985: Wolverhampton Wolves
- 1972, 1973: Oxford Rebels
- 1972, 1973: Reading Racers
- 1974: Canterbury Crusaders
- 1974–1989: Wimbledon Dons
- 1990, 1991: Rye House Rockets

Individual honours
- 1979: British Championship finalist

Team honours
- 1971: British League Division Two Champion
- 1974, 1975, 1978, 1980, 1983, 1985: London Cup
- 1979: Gauntlet Gold Cup

Roger Johns (born 1 March 1954) is a former international motorcycle speedway rider from England. He earned two international caps for the England national speedway team.

== Speedway career ==
Johns reached the final of the British Speedway Championship in 1979. He rode in the top tier of British Speedway from 1970–1991, riding for various clubs.

Johns first major success came during the 1971 British League Division Two season, when he was crowned a league champion with Eastbourne Eagles. Over three seasons (1971 to 1973) he improved his average significantly, culminating in an 8.59 average in 1973.

The majority of Johns' career was spent with Wimbledon Dons, whom he signed for £2,000 in January 1974 in readiness for the 1974 British League season. He helped Wimbledon win six London Cups from 1974 to 1985.
