= Melvyn Taylor =

British motorcycle speedway rider

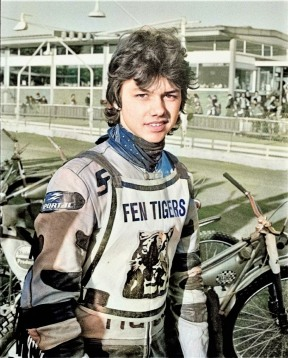
- Born: 26 April 1961 (age 65); West Row, Suffolk, England
- Nationality: British (English)

Career history
- 1977-1979, 1985-1988, 1992: Mildenhall Fen Tigers
- 1980-1983, 1988: King's Lynn Stars
- 1978-1979: Reading Racers
- 1984-1985: Oxford Cheetahs
- 1988: Ipswich Witches
- 1989-1991: Rye House Rockets

Individual honours
- 1980, 1981: British Speedway Championship finalist
- 1982: Golden Sovereign winner
- 1987: Blue Riband winner

Team honours
- 1985: British League Champion
- 1985: British League KO Cup winner
- 1979: National League Champions
- 1987: National League Pairs Winner
- 1987: National League Fours Winner
- 1980: Gauntlet Gold Cup Winner
- 1980: Inter League Knockout Cup Winner

Melvyn Roy Taylor (born 26 April 1961) is a former speedway rider from England.

== Speedway career ==
Taylor started his career at Mildenhall Fen Tigers in 1977 before riding in the top tier of British Speedway for King's Lynn Stars and Reading Racers in 1978. In 1980, he reached the Commonwealth final, which formed part of the 1980 Individual Speedway World Championship. He reached the final of the 1980 British Speedway Championship and the 1981 British Speedway Championship, finishing ninth and 12th respectively.

In 1984, Taylor was signed by Oxford Cheetahs who bought him from King's Lynn for £12,000. The Oxford team had returned to the British League and the other signings to start as the top-five riders for the season were Hans Nielsen for a record £30,000, Simon Wigg for £25,000, Marvyn Cox for £15,000 and Jens Rasmussen, with Ian Clark and Nigel Sparshott at 6 & 7. After a mid table finish in 1984, he was part of the Oxford team that won the league and cup double during a 1985 British League season. Taylor competed in the first leg of the cup final.

In 1987, Taylor won the National League Pairs, partnering Dave Jessup for the Mildenhall, during the 1987 National League season. He also won the Fours Championship with Mildenhall, during the 1987 season.

After spells at Ipswich Witches and Rye House Rockets, Taylor returned to Mildenhall for one final season in 1992.
