= Ian Cartwright (speedway rider) =

English speedway rider

- Born: 25 July 1954 (age 72); Crayke, North Yorkshire
- Nationality: British (English)

Career history
- 1973–1974: Crewe Kings
- 1974–1982: Halifax Dukes

Individual honours
- 1980, 1981: British Championship finalist

Team honours
- 1980: Northern Trophy

Ian Thompson Cartwright (born 25 July 1954) is a former motorcycle speedway rider from England.

== Speedway career ==
Cartwright, a product of the Halifax training scheme, began his league career with Crewe Kings during the 1973 British League Division Two season. The following season he continued to ride for Crewe but was also introduced to the top tier of British Speedway with the Halifax Dukes.

Cartwright would spend the remainder of his career with Halifax, riding for them from 1974 to 1982. During his nine years with the club, his average peaked in 1979 at 8.95

Cartwright reached the final of the British Speedway Championship on two occasions in 1980 and 1981.

At retirement, Cartwright had earned six international caps for the England national speedway team.
