= Martin Dixon (speedway rider) =

English speedway rider

- Born: 30 May 1961 (age 65); Hartlepool, England
- Nationality: British (English)

Career history
- 1978–1982, 1985–1989, 1996: Teesside/Middlesbrough Tigers/Bears
- 1981: Birmingham Brummies
- 1982–1983: Halifax Dukes
- 1984–1985, 1999: King's Lynn Stars
- 1986: Belle Vue Aces
- 1990–1991: Newcastle Diamonds
- 1992–1997: Long Eaton Invaders
- 1998: Stoke Potters
- 1998: Berwick Bandits
- 2000–2001: Swindon Robins
- 2002: Glasgow Tigers

Individual honours
- 1995: British Championship finalist

Team honours
- 1981: National League Champion
- 1997: Pairs Championship winner
- 1985, 1986, 1997: National League Fours Champion

Martin Dixon (born 30 May 1961) is a former motorcycle speedway rider from England.

== Speedway career ==
Dixon rode in the top tier of British Speedway from 1977 to 2002, riding for various clubs.

In 1985, Dixon helped the Middlesbrough Tigers win the Fours Championship during the 1985 National League season. The following season, in 1986, he helped the Middlesbrough win the Fours Championship again, during the 1986 National League season.

Dixon reached the final of the British Speedway Championship in 1995.

In 1997, Dixon won the Premier League Pairs Championship partnering Carl Stonehewer, while riding for Long Eaton Invaders, during the 1997 Premier League speedway season. He was also part of the Long Eaton four that won the Premier League Four-Team Championship, which was held on 3 August 1997, at the East of England Arena.
