= Arnold Haley =

British speedway rider

- Born: 15 September 1942; Leeds, England
- Died: 28 March 2003 (aged 60); Leeds, England
- Nationality: British (English)

Career history
- 1965-1978, 1980: Sheffield Tigers
- 1979: Belle Vue Aces
- 1979: Workington Comets
- 1980: Exeter Falcons
- 1980: Edinburgh Monarchs
- 1981: Cradley Heathens

Individual honours
- 1969, 1970, 1971, 1972: British Championship finalist
- 1969: World final reserve

Team honours
- 1974: Knockout Cup
- 1973, 1974: Northern Trophy

Arnold Haley (15 September 1942 – 28 March 2003) was an international motorcycle speedway rider from England. At retirement he had earned 33 international caps for the England national speedway team and 6 caps for Great Britain.

== Speedway career ==
Haley rode in the top tier of British Speedway from 1965 to 1981, riding for various clubs.

Haley spent fourteen seasons with Sheffield Tigers from 1965 to 1978. He was instrumental in helping Sheffield win the British League Knockout Cup during the 1974 British League season. In 1979, he signed for Belle Vue Aces but he struggled to find form before being loaned out to Workington Comets. His unhappy time at Belle Vue came to a quick end when he transferred to Exeter Falcons.

Haley reached the final of the British Speedway Championship on four occasions in 1969, 1970, 1971 and 1972.
