= Ian Turner (speedway rider) =

English speedway rider

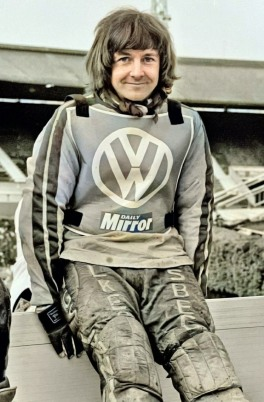
- Speedway rider
- Born: 10 February 1949 (age 77); Isleham, Cambridgeshire, England
- Nationality: British (English)

Career history
- 1969–1970: King's Lynn Starlets
- 1970, 1980: Boston Barracudas
- 1970–1980: King's Lynn Stars

Individual honours
- 1979: British Championship finalist
- 1971: British Junior Champion

Team honours
- 1977: British League KO Cup winner
- 1973: Spring Gold Cup Winner
- 1978: Inter League Knockout Cup Winner

Ian Douglas Turner (born 10 October 1949) is a former motorcycle speedway rider from England.

== Speedway career ==
On 14 July 1971, Turner won the British Speedway Under 21 Championship, held at the Abbey Stadium in Swindon. While riding for King's Lynn in 1973, he broke his arm in a crash.

Turner reached the final of the British Speedway Championship in 1979. He rode in the top tier of British Speedway from 1969 to 1980, riding primarily for King's Lynn Stars.

Turner retired in 1980 but was tempted back to ride a few matches for Boston Barracudas by promoter, Cyril Crane. He appeared in about 12 meetings, with a final appearance against Mildenhall Fen Tigers when he scored maximum points from five rides.

== Retirement ==
Post speedway, Turner drove lorries for a living and rode a Harley for a hobby. He has lived in Spalding since 1971.
