= Phil Collins (speedway rider) =

Retired English motorcycle speedway rider

- Born: 2 June 1960 (age 66); Manchester, England
- Nationality: British (English)

Career history
- 1976–1978: Ellesmere Port Gunners
- 1977–1986: Cradley Heathens

Individual honours
- 1978: British Under-21 Champion
- 1983: Overseas Champion

Team honours
- 1981, 1983: British League Champions
- 1979, 1980, 1982, 1983, 1986 (shared): British League KO Cup Winners
- 1982, 1984, 1986 (shared): League Cup Winners
- 1980, 1983, 1984: Midland Cup

Philip David Collins (born 2 June 1960 in Manchester, England) is a former motorcycle speedway rider. He finished runner-up with England in the World Team Cup final in 1984 and third in 1985. He was British Under-21 Champion in 1978. His transfer from Ellesmere Port to Cradley Heath in 1978 for £15,000 was a record transfer fee at the time.

== Career ==
Collins started his British leagues career with Ellesmere Port Gunners during the 1976 National League season. The very next season in 1977, he rode a couple of times in the top tier of speedway for the first time with Cradley Heath, while doubling up with Ellesmere Port in tier 2. In 1978, he became the British Under 21 champion and his transfer to Cradley Heath at the end of the season for £15,000 set a new British transfer record. From 1979, he rode exclusively for Cradley Heath.

Collins won his first team silverware during the 1979 British League season, winning the Knockout Cup and then repeated the success the following year, as well as winning the 1980 Midland Cup.

In 1981, Collins reached the first of his three World Longtrack finals, finishing sixth, won another Knockout Cup and helped Cradley win the league title. The Cradley team at the time were one of the strongest during that era and were led by Bruce Penhall and Erik Gundersen and they then won the Knockout Cup and League Cup in 1982. The 1983 British League season saw Cradley dominate again and Collins was part of the team that won another league title, Knockout Cup and Midland Cup. It was also during 1983 that Collins reached the final of the 1983 Individual Speedway World Championship.

Collins' last season was in 1986 and when he retired he had earned 55 international caps for the England national speedway team and 1 cap for Great Britain, in addition to reaching seven British finals.

== World final appearances ==
=== Individual World Championship ===
- 1983 – (West Germany) Norden, Motodrom Halbemond – 13th – 4pts
- 1985 – (England) Bradford, Odsal Stadium – Reserve – did not ride

=== World Team Cup ===
- 1984 – (Poland) Leszno, Alfred Smoczyk Stadium (with Chris Morton / Peter Collins / Simon Wigg / Neil Collins) – 2nd – 24pts (7)
- 1985 – USA Long Beach, Veterans Memorial Stadium (with Jeremy Doncaster / Kelvin Tatum / Richard Knight / John Davis) – 3rd – 13pts (2)

== World Longtrack Finals ==
- 1981 – (Socialist Federal Republic of Yugoslavia) Gornja Radgona 14pts (6th)
- 1982 – (Denmark) Esbjerg 0pts (18th)
- 1986 – (West Germany) Pfarrkirchen 5pts (13th)

== Family ==
Phil has four brothers all of whom were speedway riders, 1976 World Champion Peter, Les who finished second behind defending champion and home town hero Bruce Penhall at the 1982 World Final in Los Angeles, Neil and Stephen. His nephews Aidan and Chris were also riders but have both retired from the sport. Collins also has three daughters: Grace, Abigail, and Lillian Collins.
