= Nigel Flatman =

English speedway rider

- Born: 30 March 1960 (age 66); Felixstowe, England
- Nationality: British (English)

Career history
- 1977–1980, 1986–1987, 1989–1990: Peterborough Panthers
- 1977–1988: Ipswich Witches
- 1988: Poole Pirates

Individual honours
- 1979: British Under 21 silver

Team honours
- 1984: British League champion
- 1981, 1984: British League Knockout Cup winner
- 1977, 1978: National League Fours winner

Nigel William Flatman (born 30 March 1960) is a former motorcycle speedway rider from England.

== Career ==
Flatman made his British leagues debut during the 1977 National League season, where he rode for Peterborough Panthers. He helped Peterborough win the Fours Championship during the 1977 season.

The following season in 1978, Flatman was part of the Peterborough team that won the Fours championship. In 1979, he won the silver medal at the British Speedway Under 21 Championship behind Kenny Carter and was the leading rider at Peterborough.

By 1980, Flatman was also a regular rider for Ipswich Witches and reached the final of the Speedway Under-21 World Championship. He then rode exclusively for Ipswich and won the Knockout Cup in 1981 and the league and cup double during the 1984 British League season. He continued to ride for Ipswich and doubled up with Peterborough in the National league. He rode 12 consecutive years for Ipswich before having two final seasons with Peterborough in 1989 and 1990.
