= Mick Bell =

British former motorcycle speedway rider

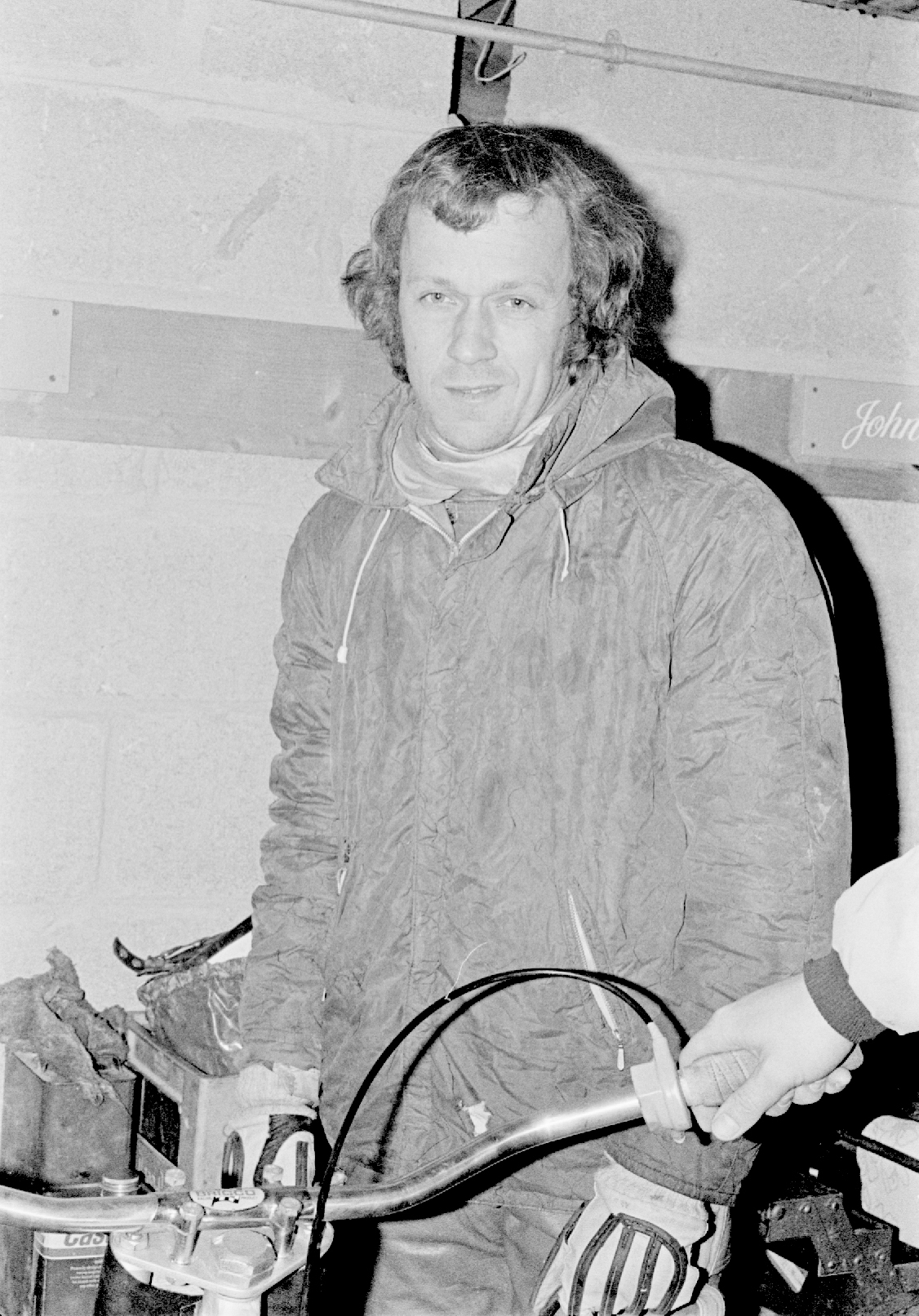
- Mick Bell pictured in 1975
- Born: 14 October 1945 (age 81); Oxford, England
- Nationality: British (English)

Career history
- 1968–1970: Oxford Cheetahs
- 1969, 1971–1973, 1975–1976: Reading Racers
- 1974: Leicester Lions
- 1977–1979: Coventry Bees

Individual honours
- 1969: Second Division Riders runner-up

Team honours
- 1973, 1978, 1979: British League Champion
- 1972: Spring Gold Cup Winner
- 1974, 1977, 1978, 1979: Midland Cup Winner

Michael John Bell (born 14 October 1945) is a former motorcycle speedway rider from England.

== Career ==
Born in Oxford, Bell made his debut for Oxford Cheetahs in 1968. In 1969 he doubled up for Oxford in Division One and Reading Racers in Division Two, averaging over nine points for Reading. He also represented Young England against Australasia and Czechoslovakia in 1969. After a further season with Oxford, he returned to the now First Division Reading in 1971, where his performances steadily improved, averaging over six points in the 1972 season.

Bell won a qualifying round of the World Speedway Championship at Coatbridge in 1973, and reached the British Final the same year. He won a British League title in 1973 with Reading before moving on to Leicester Lions in 1974 on loan, but returned to Reading in 1975 when the club re-opened at Smallmead. In 1977, he moved on to Coventry Bees where spent three seasons before retiring from the sport.

Bell returned to Reading as team manager in 1980. He later acted as team manager for Swindon Robins and Somerset Rebels.
