= Mike Lanham =

British former motorcycle speedway rider (born 1951)

- Born: 2 August 1951 (age 75); Ipswich, England
- Nationality: British (English)

Career history
- 1972: West Ham Hammers
- 1972-1982: Ipswich Witches
- 1972-1973: Birmingham Brummies
- 1974: Peterborough Panthers
- 1983: Eastbourne Eagles
- 1983: Leicester Lions

Team honours
- 1975, 1976: British League Champion
- 1976, 1978, 1981: British League KO Cup winner
- 1976: Spring Gold Cup

Michael William Lanham (born 2 August 1951) is a former motorcycle speedway rider from England, who had a long career with Ipswich Witches.

== Career ==
Lanham took up speedway in 1971 at the training school at Rye House, and was given a competitive ride the same year by Canterbury Crusaders. He won the BSSC Junior Trophy in his first season. In 1972, he was given rides by West Ham Hammers, Glasgow Tigers, Birmingham Brummies (for whom he rode in 24 matches at an average close to six points), and Ipswich Witches, the team for which he would go on to ride for eleven seasons until 1982.

In 1973, Lanham continued to split his racing between Birmingham and Ipswich and, in 1974, doubled up for Peterborough Panthers. In 1983, he moved to Eastbourne Eagles and later Leicester Lions. A broken arm, leg, and pelvis in a crash while racing towards the end of the season at Leicester Stadium put him in hospital for five weeks and led to his retirement from the sport.

Lanham rode in the Second Division 'Young England' team in 1973 and 1974. He reached the British Final in 1976, 1979, and 1980.

== Family ==
Lanham's son Leigh followed him into a career in speedway.
