= Tony Davey =

British motorcycle speedway rider

- Born: 15 August 1951 (age 75); Framsden, Suffolk, England
- Nickname: Shrimp
- Nationality: British (English)

Career history
- 1970-1980: Ipswich Witches

Individual honours
- 1973, 1975, 1978: British Championship finalist

Team honours
- 1975, 1976: British League Champion
- 1976, 1978: British League KO Cup winner
- 1971: British League Div II KO Cup winner
- 1976: Spring Gold Cup
- 1977: Inter League Knockout Cup

Anthony Thomas Davey (born 15 August 1951) is a former motorcycle speedway rider from England. He earned 11 international caps for the England national speedway team.

== Speedway career ==
Davey rode in the top tier of British Speedway from 1970 to 1980, riding for Ipswich Witches for the entire ten-year period. In 1972, he suffered a serious hand injury but went on to reach the final of the British Speedway Championship on three occasions in 1973, 1975 and 1978.

Davey recorded two 9 plus average seasons for Ipswich; 9.93 in 1971 and 9.60 in 1978.

== Post speedway ==
After speedway, Davey joined his brother Jim in running the Evergreen Garage at Crowfield for over forty years.
