= Garry Middleton =

Australian speedway rider

- Born: 19 July 1948; Corowa, New South Wales, Australia
- Died: 23 November 1994 (aged 46)
- Nationality: Australian

Career history
- 1967, 1975: King's Lynn Stars
- 1967: Belle Vue Aces
- 1967-1968: Wimbledon Dons
- 1969: Newcastle Diamonds
- 1969-1971: Hackney Hawks
- 1972: Oxford Rebels
- 1973: Coventry Bees
- 1976: Birmingham Brummies
- 1977: Leicester Lions

Team honours
- 1976: World Team Cup
- 1968, 1971: British League KO Cup
- 1968, 1971: London Cup Winner

Garry David Middleton (born 19 July 1948 Corowa, New South Wales - 23 November 1994) was an Australian motorcycle speedway rider.

== Career ==
Middleton first came to Britain in 1967 and rode for a short time with the Belle Vue Aces and the King's Lynn Stars before getting a permanent ride with the Wimbledon Dons. He stayed with the Dons for the 1968 season, but in 1969 he moved to the Hackney Hawks. He rode for the Hawks from 1969 until 1971. In 1972, he moved to the Oxford Rebels following a contract dispute with promoter Len Silver. Middleton also raced as an International rider for Australia. After a season with Coventry Bees in 1973, the Midlands club were unable to locate him for the 1974 season.

In 1975, Middleton re-signed for King's Lynn despite efforts from another of his former clubs Coventry to sign him.

== Middleton incidents ==
Middleton was nicknamed 'Cass the Gas' as he was a real showman and made his feelings known about a variety of subjects.

In 1969, Middleton was involved in an incident with Roy Trigg at Cradley Heath. Garry tried to forcefully dive under Roy but Roy saw him and slowed down, leaving Middleton to shoot straight past him into the safety fence. Middleton then went into the pits into his toolbox and pulled out a handgun. He had to be dragged from the pits to avoid further trouble. He nursed a broken shoulder during the 1969 season and was involved in several high profile incidents.

In 1971, in a meeting against then World Champion Ole Olsen, Olsen was riding so well that he was unbeaten, passing people almost for fun. In the second half of the meeting, Middleton, to entertain the crowd, jokingly strapped two broom handles to his handlebar to stop Olsen passing him. The match referee did not share his sense of humour and fined him.

== World Final appearances ==
=== World Team Cup ===
- 1976 - (England) London, White City Stadium (with John Boulger / Phil Crump / Billy Sanders / Phil Herne) - Winner - 31pts (0)
