= Bobby Beaton (speedway rider) =

British and Scottish motorcycle speedway rider (born 1952)

- Born: 14 May 1952 (age 74); Blantyre, Scotland
- Nationality: British (Scottish)

Career history
- 1968–1972, 1986–1988: Glasgow Tigers
- 1973: Coatbridge Tigers
- 1974-1981: Hull Vikings
- 1982–1984: Newcastle Diamonds
- 1982-1983: Belle Vue Aces
- 1984-1985: Edinburgh Monarchs

Individual honours
- 1980: British Championship finalist

Team honours
- 1979: Inter-League Four Team Tournament
- 1982, 1983: National League Champion
- 1982: National League KO Cup Winner
- 1982, 1983: National League Supernational Playoff Winner
- 1982, 1983: National League Four Team Champion

John Robert Thompson Beaton (born 14 May 1952) is a former international motorcycle speedway rider from Scotland.

== Speedway career ==
Beaton rode in the top tier of British Speedway from 1968 to 1985, riding for various clubs. He reached the final of the British Speedway Championship in 1980.

In 1982, Beaton helped the Newcastle Diamonds win the Fours Championship during the 1982 National League season and he repeated the success the following year during the 1983 National League season.

At retirement, Beaton had earned 15 international caps for Scotland national speedway team and one cap for the Great Britain national speedway team.

== Family ==
Beaton's younger brother Jim was a speedway rider and his older brother George was a junior rider before he was killed in a car crash in 1972. His father Jimmy Beaton Sr. was a promoter at Glasgow Tigers.
