= Kevin Jolly (speedway rider) =

British motorcycle speedway rider

- Born: 29 January 1958 (age 68); Eye, Suffolk, England
- Nickname: Nugget
- Nationality: British (English)

Career history
- 1975-1976: Mildenhall Fen Tigers
- 1976-1982, 1988: Ipswich Witches
- 1983-1986, 1988: King's Lynn Stars
- 1986: Boston Barracudas
- 1986, 1988: Swindon Robins
- 1987, 1988: Wimbledon Dons
- 1989, 1991: Peterborough Panthers
- 1990: Milton Keynes Knights

Individual honours
- 1980, 1981, 1982: British Championship finalist
- 1978: World U21 silver

Team honours
- 1976: British League Champion
- 1976, 1978, 1981: British League KO Cup winner
- 1976: Spring Gold Cup
- 1977: Inter League Knockout Cup
- 1989: Fours Championship winner

Kevin Jolly (born 29 January 1958) is an English former motorcycle speedway rider. He earned six international caps for the England national speedway team.

== Speedway career ==
Jolly rode in the top tier of British Speedway from 1975-1990, riding for various clubs.

After leaving Ipswich Witches, Jolly signed for King's Lynn Stars, where he rode from 1983 to 1986 and again in 1988. He also rode for Boston Barracudas in 1986 and was the club captain.

Jolly reached the final of the British Speedway Championship on three occasions in 1980, 1981 and 1982.

In 1989, Jolly helped the Peterborough Panthers win the Fours Championship during the 1989 National League season.
