= Reg Wilson =

British motorcycle speedway rider

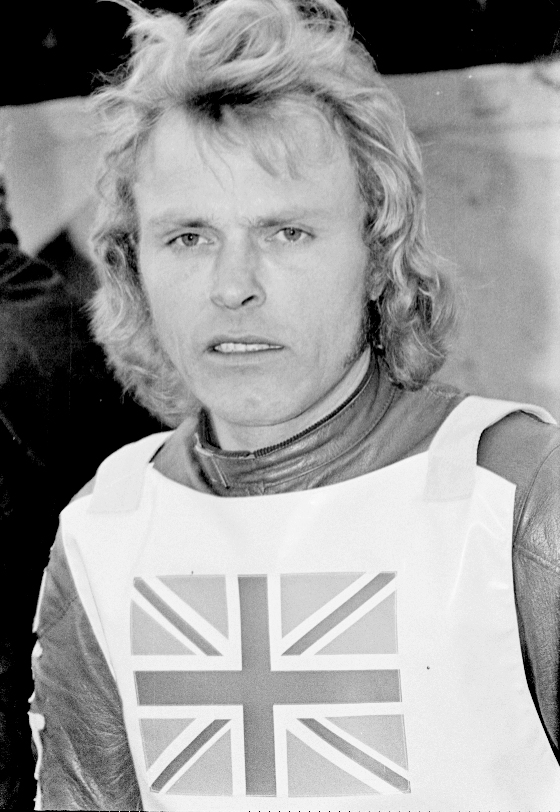
- Born: 26 January 1948 (age 78); Sheffield, England
- Nationality: British (English)

Career history
- 1969-1986: Sheffield Tigers
- 1970: Workington Comets
- 1971: Hull Vikings
- 1984: Newcastle Diamonds
- 1985-6: Birmingham Brummies

Individual honours
- 1978: Northern Riders' Championship

Team honours
- 1974: British League KO Cup winner
- 1974, 1979: Northern Trophy

Reginald Wilson (born 26 January 1948 in Sheffield, England) is a former motorcycle speedway rider. He earned seven international caps for the England national speedway team and 16 caps for the Great Britain team and later was a team manager of the Sheffield Tigers.

== Career ==
Wilson spent 18 years riding at the Owlerton club and attained a respectable average of 7.42, scoring a club record 3510.5 points including bonuses in the process.

Wilson began his British leagues career riding during the 1969 British League season and made an appearance in the Knockout Cup final for Sheffield. He completed Division two seasons with Workington Comets and Hull Vikings before becoming a regular Sheffield rider in 1972.

Wilson helped Sheffield win the 1974 Knockout Cup and won the 1978 Northern Riders' Championship.

Wilson was the team manager from 1992 until 2007. In a recent poll of all the Sheffield riders ever he came in the top three.
