= Dave Morton =

British motorcycle speedway rider

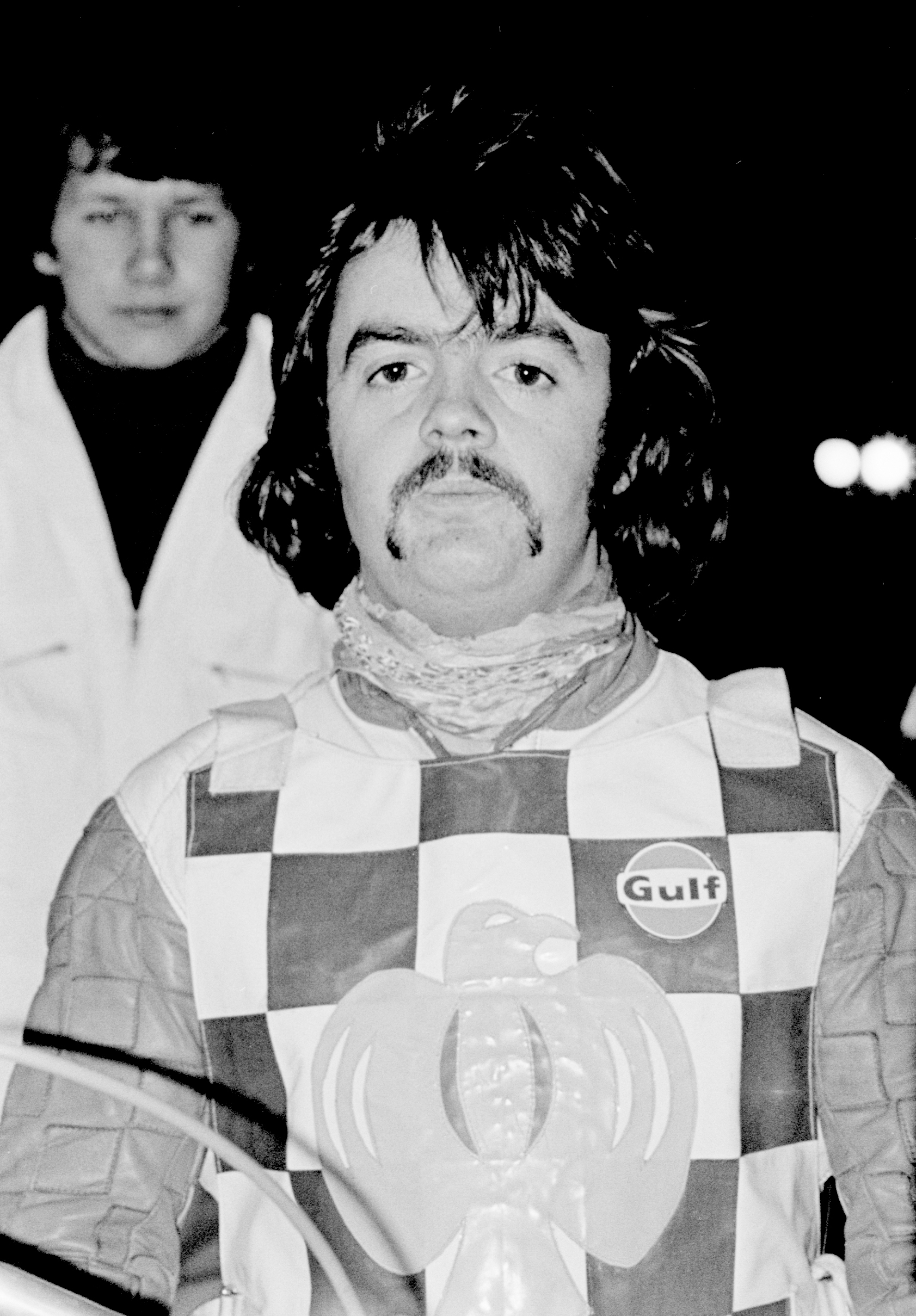
- Born: 24 September 1953 (age 73); Eccles, England
- Nationality: British (English)

Career history
- 1971–1974: Crewe Kings
- 1973–1977: Hackney Hawks
- 1978–1980: Wolverhampton Wolves
- 1981–1985: Sheffield Tigers
- 1985: Ellesmere Port Gunners
- 1986-1987: Newcastle 'Federation Specials'/Diamonds
- 1988: Long Eaton Invaders

Individual honours
- 1975: New Zealand Champion

Team honours
- 1972: British League Div 2 Winner
- 1972: British League Div 2 KO Cup Winner
- 1985: National League Champion

David James Morton (born 24 September 1953 in Eccles, Lancashire) is a former international motorcycle speedway rider from England. He earned 18 international caps for the England national speedway team.

== Career ==
Morton started his career with the Crewe Kings during the 1971 British League Division Two season. He was signed by Hackney Hawks in 1973 from Crewe Kings. He won the British Best Pairs in 1975 and his best domestic season on an individual basis was the 1976 British League season, when he recorded an impressive 10.28 league average for Hackney.

Morton almost missed the entire 1977 season with a broken leg. He requested a transfer in 1978 and was swapped for Finn Thomsen from Wolverhampton Wolves, where he rode for three seasons.

Morton won the New Zealand Championship in 1975. He was also British Finalist (1975, 1976, 1978, 1980) and New Zealand Champion (1975).

Morton retired in 1988.

== Personal life ==
Morton's brother Chris was also a speedway rider and the third most England and British capped rider of all time.

Morton now works for Swissport (formerly Servisair) at Manchester Airport as a technician on the ground support equipment for the aircraft when they are at the airport terminal. He lives in Manchester with his partner, Bernadette.

Morton likes music, especially blues and rock and bluegrass and plays a bit of banjo. He is the author of a memoir about his time in Speedway, Tapes, Breaks and Heartaches.
