= Steve Bastable =

British motorcycle speedway rider

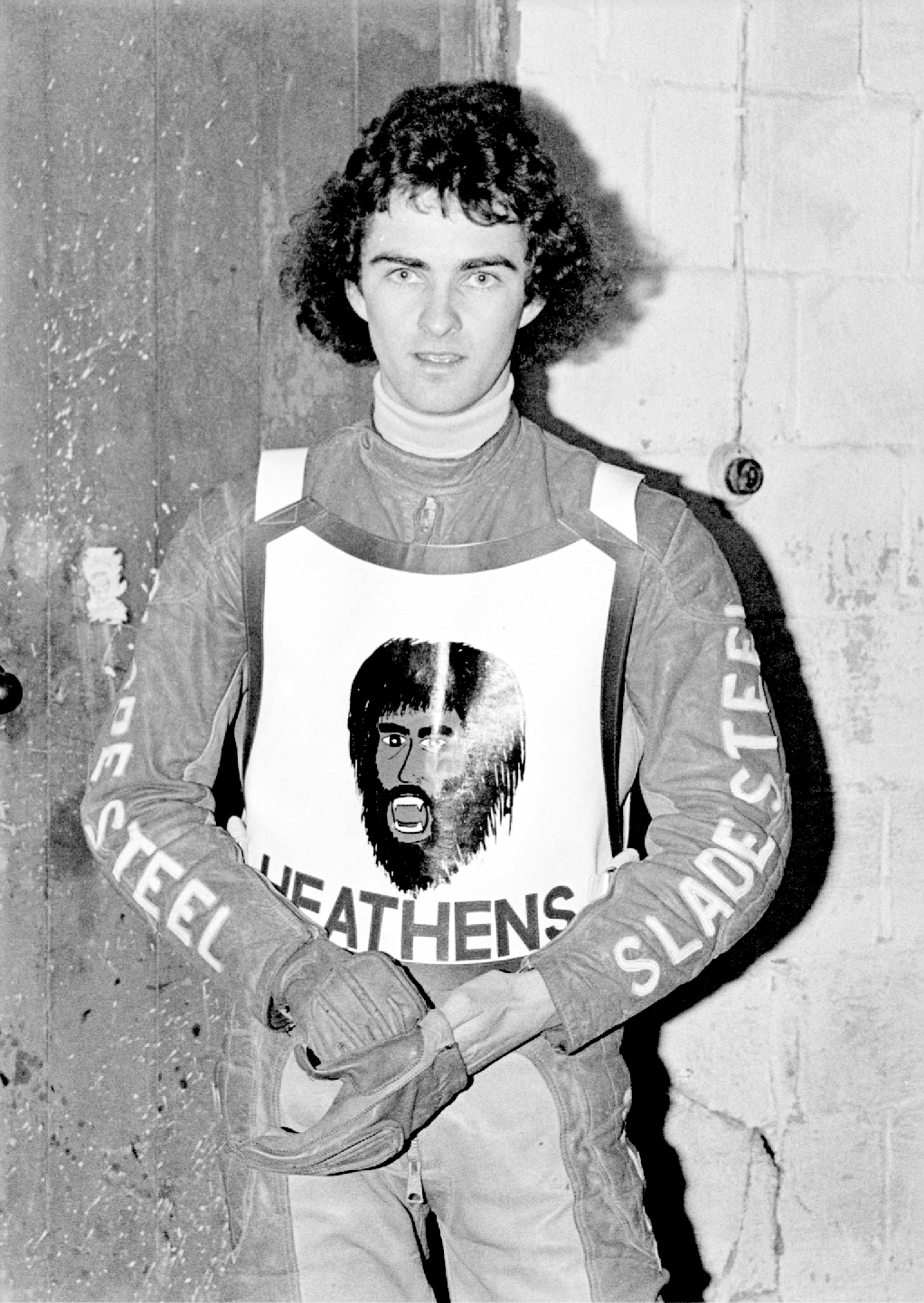
- Born: 16 September 1956 (age 70); Birmingham, England
- Nationality: British (English)

Career history
- 1974–1975, 1988: Stoke Potters
- 1974–1979, 1986: Cradley United/Heathens
- 1979–1980: Birmingham Brummies
- 1981–1982: Swindon Robins
- 1983–1985: Coventry Bees
- 1987: Bradford Dukes

Individual honours
- 1981: British Champion

Team honours
- 1986 (shared): British League KO Cup Winner
- 1978: British League Pairs Champion
- 1985, 1986 (shared): British League Cup Winner

Stephen Henry Bastable (born 16 September 1956, in Birmingham) is a former motorcycle speedway rider from England.

== Family ==
Bastable's father Henry, was also a speedway rider.

== Career ==
Bastable spent the majority of his career with the Cradley Heathens but in three years with the Coventry Bees he scored almost one thousand points.

In 1978, Bastable won the British League Pairs Championship with Bruce Penhall, during the 1978 British League season. Three years later, he won the 1981 British Speedway Championship and the same season joined Swindon Robins as the team captain. He joined Coventry Bees in 1983.

In 1988, Bastable won the National League Pairs, partnering Graham Jones for the Stoke Potters, during the 1988 National League season.

At retirement, Bastable had earned 18 international caps for the England national speedway team.

== World Final Appearances ==
- 1978 - (England) London, Wembley Stadium - Reserve - did not ride
