= Doug Wyer =

British motorcycle speedway rider

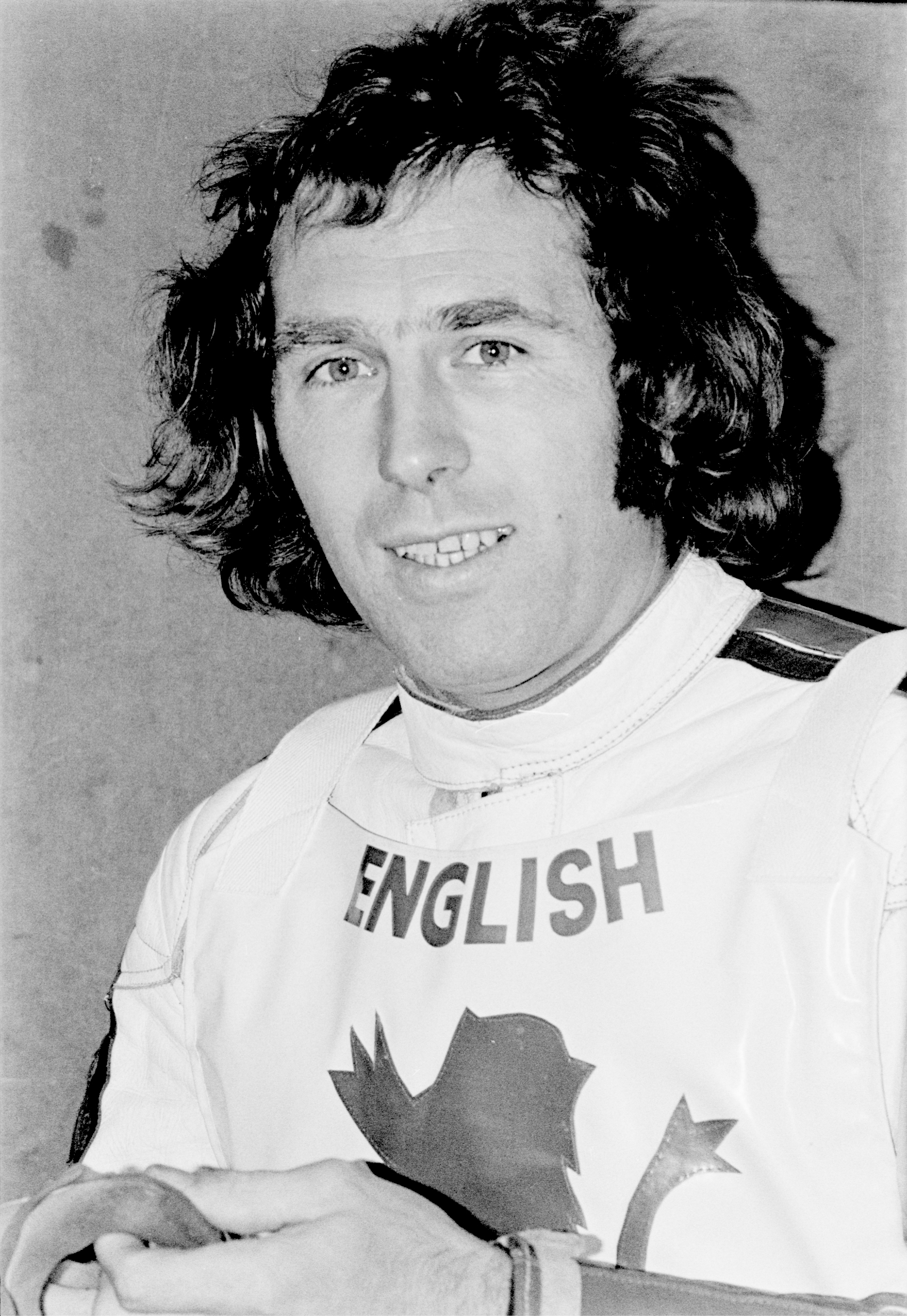
- Born: 16 August 1947 (age 79); Nottingham, England
- Nationality: British (English)

Career history
- 1969: Doncaster Stallions
- 1969–1980, 1986: Sheffield Tigers
- 1970–1971: Berwick Bandits
- 1981–1985: Halifax Dukes
- 1985: Birmingham Brummies
- 1986–1988: Edinburgh Monarchs

Individual honours
- 1976, 1979: Northern Riders' champion
- 1980: South Australian Champion
- 1977: Skol Northern Masters

Team honours
- 1974: British League KO Cup winner
- 1986: National League Pairs Champion
- 1973, 1974, 1979: Northern Trophy

Douglas Wyer (born 16 August 1947 in Nottingham, Nottinghamshire, England) is a former international motorcycle speedway rider who reached the final of the Speedway World Championship in 1976. He earned 46 international caps for the England national speedway team and 14 caps for the Great Britain team.

== Career ==
After initially riding for Doncaster Stallions, Wyer was loaned out to Berwick Bandits by his parent club Sheffield Tigers. Wyer rode for Young Lions against Great Britain on 6 April 1976 at Leicester Stadium and remained a Sheffield rider until 1980.

In 1980, Wyer won the South Australian Championship at the then new Speedway Park in Adelaide. The 430 metres (470 yd) long Speedway Park was a different track than Wyer was used to as its surface is clay rather than the dirt/shale track he rode in at home.

Wyer won the National League Pairs, partnering Les Collins for the Edinburgh Monarchs, during the 1986 National League season.

== World Final Appearances ==
- 1976 - (Poland) Chorzów, Silesian Stadium - 7th - 8 pts
