= Gordon Kennett =

English speedway rider (1953–2023)

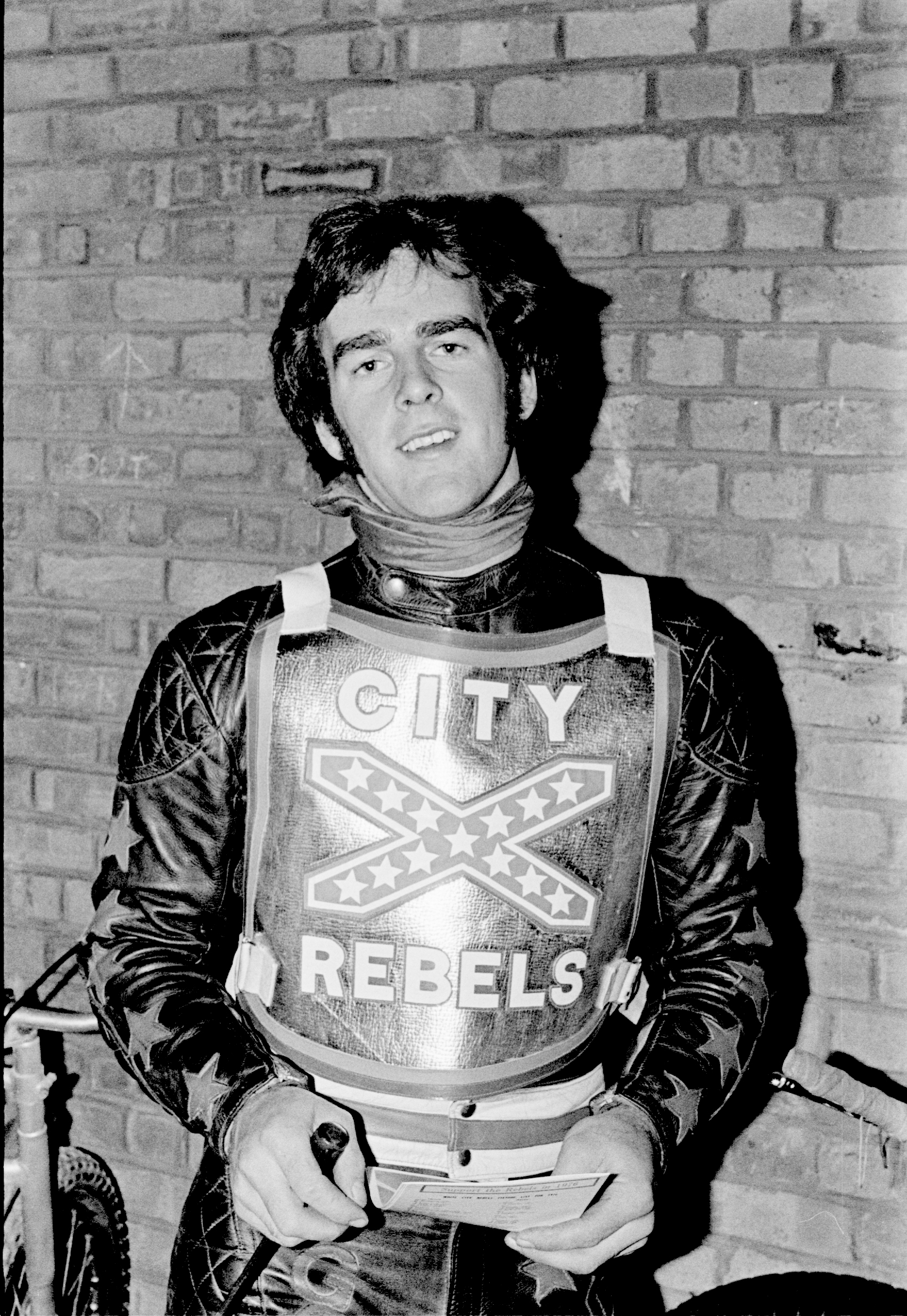
- Kennett in 1976
- Born: 2 September 1953; Bromley, England
- Died: 11 September 2023 (aged 70); Canary Islands
- Nationality: British (English)

Career history
- 1970–1972, 1979–1982, 1985–1990: Eastbourne Eagles
- 1970, 1984: Wimbledon Dons
- 1971: Hackney Hawks
- 1972–1975: Oxford Rebels
- 1976–1978: White City Rebels
- 1971, 1983: King's Lynn Stars
- 1985: Swindon Robins
- 1991–1992: Milton Keynes Knights
- 1993: Exeter Falcons
- 1993–1994: Wolverhampton Wolves

Individual honours
- 1976: London Riders' Champion
- 1977: Pride of the Midlands
- 1978: Olympique

Team honours
- 1978: World Pairs Champion
- 1977: British League Champion
- 1975: Midland Cup Winner
- 1971, 1986, 1987: National League Champion
- 1985, 1986, 1987: National League Knockout Cup Winner

Gordon William Kennett (2 September 1953 – 11 September 2023) was an English motorcycle speedway rider. In 1978, he won the World Pairs Championship and finished runner-up to Ole Olsen in the 1978 Individual Speedway World Championship, at Wembley. He earned 53 international caps for the England national speedway team.

== Career ==
Kennett began his speedway career during the 1970 British League Division Two season, after he joined the Eastbourne Eagles. He soon established himself as a heat leader and the following season in 1971, was instrumental in helping Eastbourne win the league title. Kennett, along with Malcolm Ballard and his brother Dave Kennett formed a strong trio of riders at the top of the Eastbourne averages.

In 1972, Kennett continued to ride for Eastbourne and made his first Oxford appearance in the higher league, riding for the rebranded Oxford Rebels. Oxford paid a National League record fee of £1,500 at the time for his services. He stayed with Oxford for the next three seasons, scoring solidly but the team underperformed until 1975, when they won the Midland Cup in a dramatic competition that saw home and away draws with Swindon Robins, requiring reruns and a home and away victory over Wolverhampton Wolves to secure the trophy. On an individual basis he reached the British Speedway Championship final for the first time in 1975.

In 1976, Kennett moved with the team known as the White City Rebels, that switched from Oxford to White City. He was captain and impressed averaging 9.69 and topping the team's averages and was now regarded as one of the sport's leading riders. In 1977, he averaged 10.41 and helped White City Rebels win the British League. He had one final season with White City, during the 1978 British League season before the team folded. However, it was during this season that Kennett recorded his greatest achievements, becoming a World Pairs champion with Malcolm Simmons and finishing second in the World Championship on 2 September 1978.

In 1979, Kennett returned to his first club Eastbourne, topping the team averages for the next four years. He was a regular rider for England and would go on to earn 53 caps during his career.

The next couple of seasons, Kennett rode for King's Lynn Stars and Wimbledon Dons before returning to Eastbourne again in 1985. He was now riding National League speedway and finished top of the league averages and won the Knockout Cup in the 1985 National League season. The success at Eastbourne continued, as he won the "double double" of league and cup in 1986 and 1987. He continued to be the number one rider at Eastbourne until the end of the 1990 season. His final season was his 25th, when he appeared for Wolverhampton Wolves in the 1994 British League.

== Personal life and death ==
Brothers Dave Kennett and Barney Kennett also rode, as did his nephew Edward Kennett (son of Dave) and also represented Great Britain in the Speedway World Cup.

After retiring in 1995, Kennett worked as a car mechanic. He was later a team manager for the Oxford Cheetahs, during the years that they had no home.

Kennett lived in Bexhill with his wife, Susan. He died 11 September 2023, at the age of 70, while in the Canary Islands.

== World Final appearances ==
=== Individual World Championship ===
- 1978 - (England) - London, Wembley Stadium - 2nd - 12pts

=== World Pairs Championship ===
- 1978 - (Poland) Chorzów, Silesian Stadium (with Malcolm Simmons) - Winner - 24pts (9)

=== World Team Cup ===
- 1978 - (West Germany) Landshut, Ellermühle Stadium (with Malcolm Simmons / Dave Jessup / Peter Collins / Michael Lee) - 2nd - 27pts (3)
- 1981 - (West Germany) Olching, Speedway Stadion Olching (with Dave Jessup / Chris Morton / Kenny Carter / John Davis) - 2nd - 29pts (1)
