= British Speedway Championship =

Annual motorcycle speedway competition

- Current season, competition or edition: 2026 British Speedway Championship
- Sport: Speedway
- Founded: 1961
- Country: Great Britain
- Most recent champion: Robert Lambert

The British Speedway Championship is an annual motorcycle speedway competition open to British national speedway riders. The winner of the event becomes the British Speedway Champion.

== History ==
Inaugurated in 1961 as a qualifying round of the Speedway World Championship it was open to riders from Britain and the British dominions. It was initially dominated by riders from New Zealand such as Barry Briggs and Ivan Mauger because of the British Final forming part of the World Speedway championship qualifying rounds. Briggs and Mauger were multiple world champions. It was not until 1975 that the final was restricted to British riders. Countries such as Australia and New Zealand then held their own World Individual Speedway championship qualifying rounds. In the first dozen finals, it was only won twice by a British born rider, both times by Peter Craven.

Australians Rory Schlein and Jason Crump rode under an ACU (British) licence.

== British Champions ==
Year	Winner	Runner-Up	Third
1961	Barry Briggs ( (New Zealand) )	Peter Craven	Ronnie Moore ( (New Zealand) )
1962	Peter Craven	Barry Briggs ( (New Zealand) )	Ronnie Moore ( (New Zealand) )
1963	Peter Craven	Barry Briggs ( (New Zealand) )	Nigel Boocock
1964	Barry Briggs ( (New Zealand) )	Ken McKinlay	Ron How
1965	Barry Briggs ( (New Zealand) )	Nigel Boocock	Ken McKinlay
1966	Barry Briggs ( (New Zealand) )	Ivan Mauger ( (New Zealand) )	Colin Pratt
1967	Barry Briggs ( (New Zealand) )	Ivan Mauger ( (New Zealand) )	Eric Boocock
1968	Ivan Mauger ( (New Zealand) )	Barry Briggs ( (New Zealand) )	Eric Boocock
1969	Barry Briggs ( (New Zealand) )	Nigel Boocock	Ronnie Moore ( (New Zealand) )
1970	Ivan Mauger ( (New Zealand) )	Ronnie Moore ( (New Zealand) )	Roy Trigg
1971	Ivan Mauger ( (New Zealand) )	Barry Briggs ( (New Zealand) )	Tony Lomas
1972	Ivan Mauger ( (New Zealand) )	Nigel Boocock	Barry Briggs ( (New Zealand) )
1973	Ray Wilson	Bob Valentine ( (Australia) )	Peter Collins
1974	Eric Boocock	Terry Betts	Dave Jessup
1975	John Louis	Peter Collins	Malcolm Simmons
1976	Malcolm Simmons	Chris Morton	Doug Wyer
1977	Michael Lee	Dave Jessup	Doug Wyer
1978	Michael Lee	Dave Jessup	Malcolm Simmons
1979	Peter Collins	Michael Lee	Dave Jessup
1980	Dave Jessup	Michael Lee	Phil Collins
1981	Steve Bastable	Kenny Carter	John Louis
1982	Andy Grahame	Alan Grahame	Kenny Carter
1983	Chris Morton	Michael Lee	Andy Grahame
1984	Kenny Carter	Andy Grahame	Dave Jessup
1985	Kenny Carter	John Davis	Kelvin Tatum
1986	Neil Evitts	Phil Collins	Jeremy Doncaster
1987	Kelvin Tatum	Neil Evitts	Simon Wigg
1988	Simon Wigg	Kelvin Tatum	Chris Morton
1989	Simon Wigg	Kelvin Tatum	Alan Grahame
1990	Kelvin Tatum	Simon Cross	Jeremy Doncaster
1991	Gary Havelock	Kelvin Tatum	Chris Louis
1992	Gary Havelock	Martin Dugard	Andy Smith
1993	Andy Smith	Joe Screen	Gary Havelock
1994	Andy Smith	Joe Screen	Steve Schofield
1995	Andy Smith	Joe Screen	Dean Barker
1996	Joe Screen	Chris Louis	Carl Stonehewer
1997	Mark Loram	Chris Louis	Sean Wilson
1998	Chris Louis	Joe Screen	Paul Hurry
1999	Mark Loram	Joe Screen	Chris Louis
2000	Chris Louis	Paul Hurry	Martin Dugard
2001	Mark Loram	Stuart Robson	Martin Dugard
2002	Scott Nicholls	Lee Richardson	David Howe
2003	Scott Nicholls	Dean Barker	David Norris
2004	Joe Screen	David Norris	Mark Loram
2005	Scott Nicholls	Chris Harris	Joe Screen
2006	Scott Nicholls	Joe Screen	Simon Stead
2007	Chris Harris	David Howe	Scott Nicholls
2008	Scott Nicholls	Edward Kennett	Tai Woffinden
2009	Chris Harris	Edward Kennett	Tai Woffinden
2010	Chris Harris	Scott Nicholls	Ben Barker
2011	Scott Nicholls	Chris Harris	Tai Woffinden
2012	Scott Nicholls	Chris Harris	Tai Woffinden
2013	Tai Woffinden	Scott Nicholls	Chris Harris
2014	Tai Woffinden	Craig Cook	Ben Barker
2015	Tai Woffinden	Craig Cook	Danny King
2016	Danny King	Craig Cook	Robert Lambert
2017	Craig Cook	Steve Worrall	Rory Schlein ( (Australia) )
2018	Robert Lambert	Dan Bewley	Craig Cook
2019	Charles Wright	Danny King	Craig Cook
2020	Rory Schlein ( (Australia) )	Richard Lawson	Jason Crump ( (Australia) )
2021	Adam Ellis	Dan Bewley	Charles Wright
2022	Dan Bewley	Tom Brennan	Craig Cook
2023	Dan Bewley	Steve Worrall	Ben Barker
2024	Dan Bewley	Tai Woffinden	Tom Brennan
2025	Robert Lambert	Charles Wright	Dan Bewley
2026	Robert Lambert	Charles Wright	Leon Flint

== Medals classification ==
Pos	Rider	Gold	Silver	Bronze
1.	Scott Nicholls	7	2	1
2.	Barry Briggs ( (New Zealand) )	6	4	1
3.	Ivan Mauger ( (New Zealand) )	4	2	
4.	Chris Harris	3	3	1
5.	Dan Bewley	3	2	1
6.	Tai Woffinden	3	1	4
7.	Mark Loram	3		1
	Andy Smith	3		1
	Robert Lambert	3		1
10.	Joe Screen	2	6	1
11.	Kelvin Tatum	2	3	1
12.	Michael Lee	2	3	
13.	Chris Louis	2	2	2
14.	Kenny Carter	2	1	1
15.	Peter Craven	2	1	
16.	Simon Wigg	2		1
	Gary Havelock	2		1
18.	Craig Cook	1	3	3
19.	Dave Jessup	1	2	3
20.	Charles Wright	1	2	1
21.	Peter Collins	1	1	1
	Chris Morton	1	1	1
	Andy Grahame	1	1	1
	Danny King	1	1	1
25.	Eric Boocock	1		2
	Malcolm Simmons	1		2
27.	Neil Evitts	1	1	
28.	John Louis	1		1
	Rory Schlein ( (Australia) )	1		1
30.	Ray Wilson	1		
	Steve Bastable	1		
	Adam Ellis	1		

== See also ==
- British Speedway Under 19 Championship
- British Speedway Under 21 Championship
- Speedway in the United Kingdom
