= Kingsmead Stadium =

Former sports venue in Canterbury, England

- Interactive map of Kingsmead Stadium
- Location: North-east Canterbury
- Coordinates: 51.286°N 1.086°E

Construction
- Opened: 1958
- Closed: 1999

Kingsmead Stadium was a greyhound racing and motorcycle speedway track and Association football ground in Canterbury. It was host to Canterbury City F.C. and the Canterbury Crusaders speedway team.

The stadium closed in 1999 and was demolished, making way for a residential development.

== Origins ==
The stadium was built on top of a rubbish dump site sandwiched between the Great Stour which flowed to the north and south of the stadium. Access was on the west side of the Kingsmead Road. It opened for football on 30 August 1958 and was also used by Canterbury City F.C., it also doubled up as an athletics track.

== Speedway ==
On 18 May 1968 the speedway track opened for business with the Canterbury Crusaders taking on the Belle Vue Colts. In 1977, the speedway promoters Johnnie Hoskins and Wally Mawdsley had to go to court in order to keep the track open after complaints of noise from local residents. However, the team was forced to disband on 31 October 1987 when the Canterbury Council refused to renew the lease.

== Greyhound racing ==
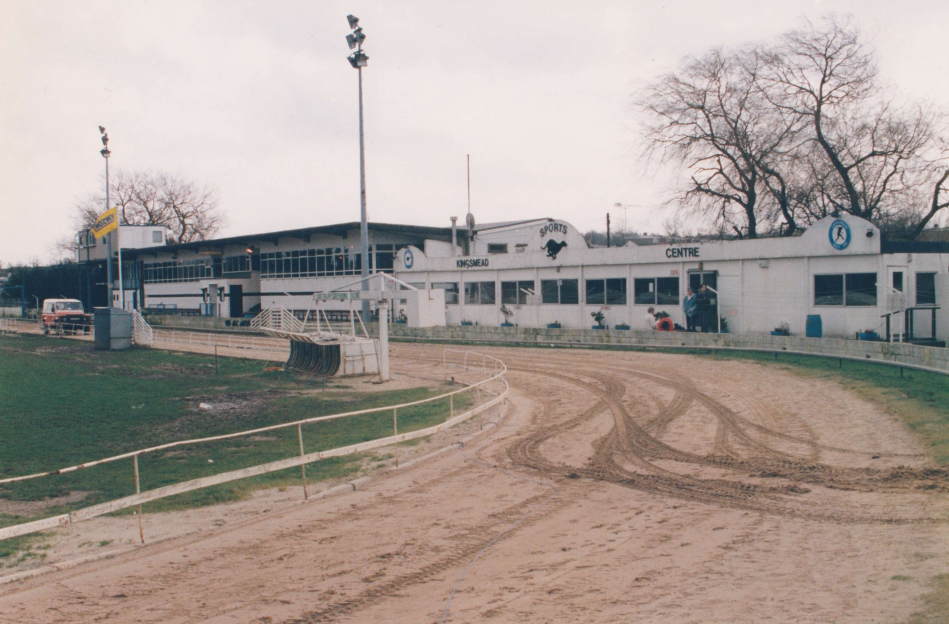
Canterbury Greyhound track, Kingsmead Stadium c.1980

The introduction of greyhound racing was problematic as the track encountered issues over the track surface. A wider 398 metres circumference oval was quickly constructed to replace the original track dimensions. The speedway had ended on 31 October 1987 and the greyhounds started just two months earlier on 28 August. The General Manager was Wally Mawdsley (also one of the speedway promoters) and the Racing Manager was Frank Baldwin (soon to be replaced by David Day) when racing began and later Steve Hibbard.

The stadium applied and gained a National Greyhound Racing Club licence under the permit scheme. Race days were Tuesday, Thursday and Friday evenings, trials were held on Monday mornings and the original circumference was 357 m (1,171 ft) with distances of 400, 578 and 757 metres with an 'Outside Sumner' hare. There were kennels for 82 greyhounds and the public facilities included three bars, a refreshment room and a 150 seated restaurant.

The track experienced unprecedented success for a small track after recruiting Irishman John McGee Sr., McGee also known as Ginger McGee had worked for Fred Wiseman before taking out a trainer's licence and joining Canterbury. The McGee trained Hit the Lid won the 1988 English Greyhound Derby for the stadium.

The track secured a lucrative Bookmakers Afternoon Greyhound Service (BAGS) contract and Hit The Lid was announced the 1988 Greyhound of the year and McGee claimed two consecutive Trainer of the year titles in 1988 & 1989. The Thames Silver Salver previously run at Southend Stadium was introduced by Canterbury as the main competition in 1988 and it was to take place in the summer renamed just the Silver Salver.

Trainer Patsy Byrne joined the track and trained Juvenile champion Druids Johno; the black dog was half owned by Prince Edward, Earl of Wessex. The half share had been given to the Prince by Byrne during a charity meeting at Canterbury, all prize money would go to the Royal Marines Benevolent Fund. It was the same year that black dog was the beaten favourite in the 1990 English Greyhound Derby Final.

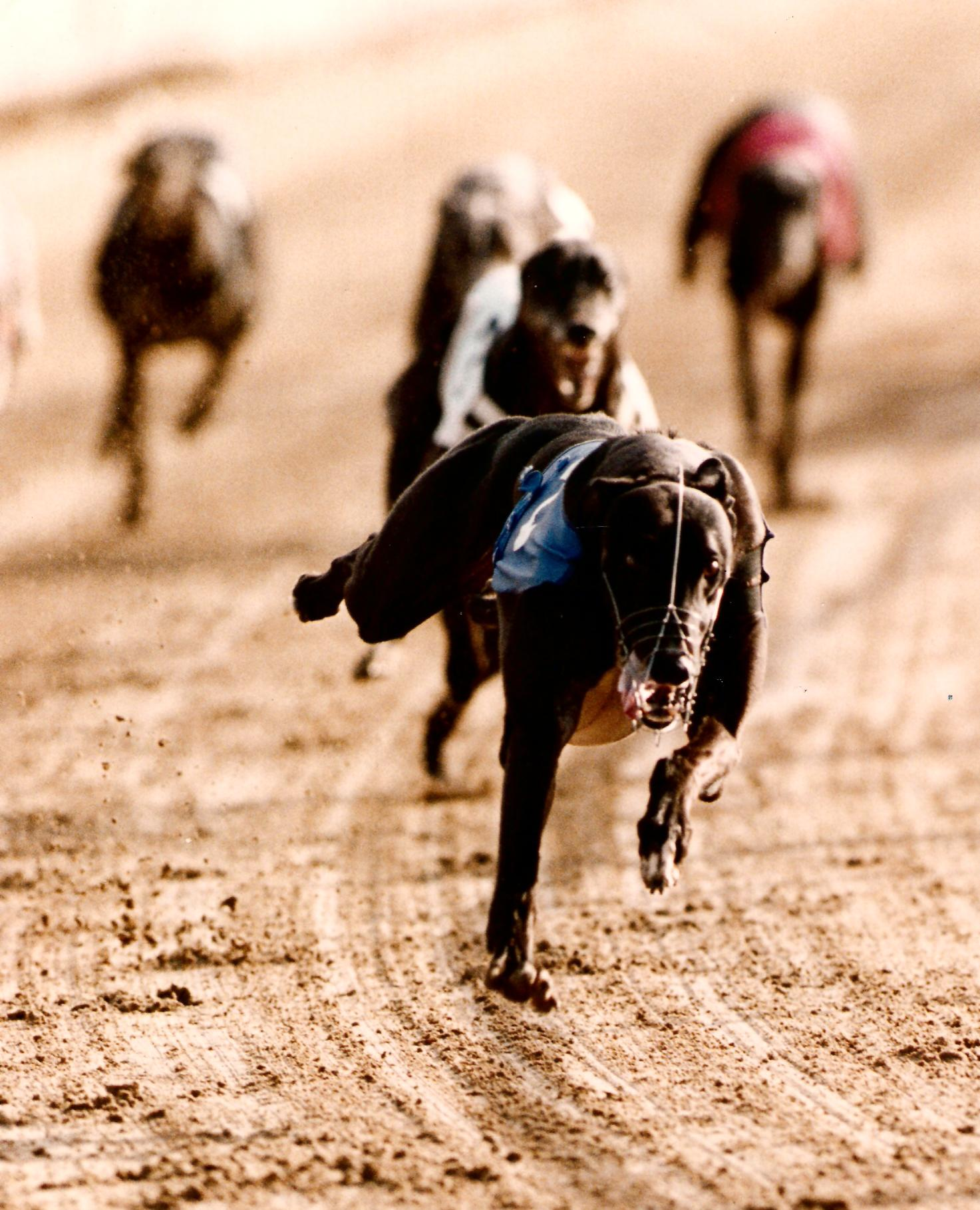
Laurels champion Glengar Ranger

In 1991 Glengar Ranger won the Laurels. The following year, Canterbury played host to a new TV channel called Sportscast and Glengar Ranger reached the 1992 English Greyhound Derby final to put the seal on another progressive year.

== Closure ==
In 1995 the track was refused a betting licence, forcing trainers to march on council offices in protest. A reprieve arrived, but clearly there were problems with the local council. A year later plans were rejected for a redevelopment proposal for houses and a hotel, but it was known that further plans would be submitted.

In October 1997 a development brief was approved and in 1998 it was revised to include 140 residential units. On 30 October 1999 racing came to an end at Kingsmead Stadium. The site was soon demolished, and today it is where Ambleside Place and Westwood Drive is situated.

== Track records ==
Distance metres	Greyhound	Time	Date
245	Glenvale Boy	14.75	03.03.1989
275	Cora Hill	16.43	1994
400	Westwood Ho	25.45	1987
400	Straight Through	25.45	1987
400	Bluefalls Boy	25.45	1988
400	Glaires Fever	25.45	1988
410	Ballinlough	25.12	29.03.1988
430	Union Decree	26.55	04.04.1999
430	Union Decree	26.33	25.04.1999
450	Tip For Glory	27.23	21.10.1988
450	Burgess Bard	27.18	08.04.1991
480	Paradise Slippy	28.97	1994
578	Bedemar Zelda	37.15	1987
645	Run on Terry	39.94	29.03.1988
675	Liberal Idea	41.88	1994
757	Denes Mutt	50.43	1987
850	Proud to Run	54.30	1987
850	Minnies Siren	54.18	11.11.1989
880	Back Before Dawn	56.34	1994
1045	Deenside Madam	69.86	23.10.1989
450 H	Emerald Trail	27.70	30.06.1989
480 H	Cassies Street	29.54	1994
625 H	El Tenor	39.50	25.04.1999
645 H	Razmac Dancer	41.29	10.07.1990
645 H	Brosna River	41.27	28.08.1990
