= 1980 Individual Long Track World Championship =

Long track motorcycle racing event

Seasons
- ← 1979 1981 →

The 1980 Individual Long Track World Championship was the tenth edition of the FIM speedway Individual Long Track World Championship. The event was held on 14 September 1980 at Scheeßel in West Germany.

The World title was won by Karl Maier of West Germany. The Championship consisted of four qualifying rounds at Harsewinkel, Korskro, Hamburg-Farmsen, Pfarrkirchen won by Bruce Penhall, Ivan Mauger, Egon Müller and Georg Hack respectively and two semi finals in Jübek and Gornja Radgona won by Ole Olsen and Josef Aigner.

== Final Classification ==
Pos	Rider	Heat Pts	Heat Pts	Heat Pts	Heat Pts	Heat Pts	Pts
1	(West Germany) Karl Maier	5	3	5	5	5	23
2	(West Germany) Egon Müller	5	4	4	3	2	18
3	(West Germany) Josef Aigner	3	3	5	1	4	16
3	(West Germany) Christoph Betzl	4	5	1	3	3	16
5	(West Germany) Georg Hack	f	5	4	4	1	14
6	(West Germany) Wilhelm Duden	4	2	ef	5	E	11
7	(New Zealand) Ivan Mauger	5	ef	2	2	E	9
8	(Czechoslovakia) Zdeněk Kudrna	1	4	2	2	E	9
9	(Denmark) Ole Olsen	1	4	3	0	E	8
10	(England) Michael Lee	2	3	2	1	E	8
11	(England) Peter Collins	3	1	3	0	E	7
12	(Czechoslovakia) Jiří Štancl	3	ef	3	E	E	6
13	(England) Chris Morton	0	1	4	E	E	5
14	(Czechoslovakia) Milan Špinka	2	2	1	E	E	5
15	(Netherlands) Fritz Koning	1	2	ef	E	E	3
16	(Sweden) Anders Michanek	2	ef	ef	E	E	2
17	(United States) Bruce Penhall	ef	0	0	E	E	0
18	(West Germany) Alois Wiesböck	4	5	5	4	0	18 (disq)+

+ Alois Wiesböck finished third but was disqualified because his engine was found to be over the prescribed limit. Bronze medals were awarded to both Betzl and Aigner.
