= 1976 Individual Speedway World Championship =

Motorcycle speedway world championship season

Seasons
- ← 1975 1977 →

The 1976 Individual Speedway World Championship was the 31st edition of the official World Championship to determine the world champion rider.

England's Peter Collins became the first British World Speedway Champion since Peter Craven had won in 1962. Fellow Englishman Malcolm Simmons finished second with Australia's Phil Crump finishing third. 1976 was the first time since 1952 that no rider from either New Zealand or Sweden finished on the podium in the World Final.

Qualifying results.

== First round ==
=== British Preliminary round ===
- Riders progress to British qualifying round

Date	Venue	Winner	2nd	3rd
3 April	Shielfield Park, Berwick	Taffy Owen	Tom Owen	Graham Jones
10 April	Kingsmead Stadium, Canterbury	Reg Luckhurst	Ted Hubbard	Graham Banks
11 April	Mildenhall Stadium, Mildenhall	Kevin Jolly	Andy Cusworth	Laurie Etheridge
13 April	Wessex Stadium, Weymouth	Tony Featherstone	Bob Coles	Barney Kennett

=== British qualifying round ===
- Riders progress to British quarter finals

Date	Venue	Winner	2nd	3rd
22 April	Owlerton Stadium, Sheffield	Trevor Geer	Alan Grahame	Paul Tyrer
23 April	Monmore Green, Wolverhampton	Alan Molyneux	Brian Havelock	Bob Coles
24 April	Abbey Stadium, Swindon	Dave Perks	Steve Bastable	Tom Owen
24 April	Dudley Wood Stadium, Dudley	Bobby McNeil	Mick Hines	Mick Bell

== Second round ==
=== Swedish qualification ===
- Top 5 in each heat to Swedish final

(6 May, Kumla Motorstadion Kumla)
Pos	Rider	Points
1	Bernt Persson	15
2	Tommy Nilsson	13
3	Sören Sjösten	12
4	Bo Jansson	12
5	Bengt Jansson	11
6	Jan Simensen	10
7	Gunnar Malmqvist	8
8	Leif Enecrona	8
9	Börje Klingberg	6
10	Bernt Johansson	4
11	Bo Andersson	4
12	Peter Smith	4
13	Sven-Inge Svensson	4
14	Therje Henriksson	3
15	Kjell Bergström	2
16	Benny Ekberg	2
17	Eskil Jonsson	1
18	Harald Sandberg	0

(9 May, Målilla (Motorbana) Målilla )
Pos	Rider	Points
1	Lars Jansson	15
2	Bo Wirebrand	13
3	Per-Åke Gerhardsson	12
4	Tommy Johansson	11
5	Sven Nilsson	10
6	Richard Hellsén	9
7	Karl-Erik Claesson	8
8	Eddie Davidsson	7
9	Lars Larsson	7
10	Bo Josefsson	6
11	Willy Karlsson	4
12	Tomas Pettersson	4
13	Jan Andersson	3
14	Stefan Salmonsson	3
15	Sigvard Johansson	3
16	Lars-Inge Hultberg	3
17	Peter Carlsson	2
18	Sune Stark	0

(9 May, Motorbanen Hagalund Lindesberg)
Pos	Rider	Points
1	Tommy Jansson	15
2	Hasse Holmqvist	13
3	Christer Sjösten	12
4	Sören Karlsson	11
5	Lars-Åke Andersson	10+3
6	Per-Olof Dovhjort	10+2
7	Claes-Ingvar Svensson	8
8	Kenneth Selmosson	8
9	Bengt Larsson	7
10	Lars-Olof Karlsson	6
11	Bertil Andersson	5
12	Leif Johansson	5
13	Ragnar Holm	5
14	Leif Mellberg	2
15	Stephan Johansson	1
16	Åke Dovhed	1
17	Kari Vuoristo	1
18	Curt Nyqvist	0

=== New Zealand qualification ===
- Top 16 to New Zealand final

Date	Venue	Winner	2nd	3rd
South Island Final
6 December, '75	Oreti Park Speedway, Invercargill	Larry Ross	Graeme Stapleton	Denis Sincock
North Island Final
10 January	Showgrounds, Palmerston North	Colin Farquharson	Colin Tucker	Roy Trigg

=== Australian qualification ===
Date	Venue	Winner	2nd	3rd
New South Wales Round
22 November '75	Liverpool Speedway, Green Valley	Billy Sanders	Phil Herne	Mitch Shirra
28 November '75	Jerilderie Park Speedway, Tomago	Phil Herne	Terry Southerland	Mitch Shirra
29 November '75	Sydney Showground, Sydney	Mitch Shirra	Phil Herne	Billy Sanders
Queensland Qualification
6 December '75	Brisbane Exhibition Ground, Brisbane	Mike Farrell	Ron Henderson	Darryl McLean
Southern Territory Qualification
9 January	Rowley Park Speedway, Adelaide	John Boulger	Ray Snider	Robin Amundson
Victoria Qualification
17 January	Northern Park Raceway, Melbourne	Danny Kennedy	Rob Jones	John Dewhurst
Northern District
23 January	Rowley Park Speedway, Adelaide	Phil Crump	John Boulger	Kym Amundson
31 January	Sydney Showground, Sydney	Billy Sanders	Mike Farrell	John Langfield
7 February	Brisbane Exhibition Ground, Brisbane	Mike Farrell	John Titman	Garry Middleton

=== British quarter-finals ===
- Top 32 to British semi-finals

Date	Venue	Winner	2nd	3rd
3 May	Birchfield Ladbroke Stadium, Birmingham	Peter Collins	Chris Pusey	Alan Molyneux
5 May	Wimborne Road, Poole	Dave Jessup	Dave Morton	Arthur Price
8 May	Hyde Road, Manchester	Alan Grahame	John Davis	Michael Lee
8 May	King's Lynn Stadium, King's Lynn	Malcolm Simmons	Chris Morton	Doug Wyer

=== Continental Preliminary round ===
- Riders progress to Continental quarter-finals

Date	Venue	Winner	2nd	3rd
25 April	(Italy) La Favorita, Sarego	(West Germany) Hans Wassermann	(Czechoslovakia) Evzen Erban	(Czechoslovakia) Karel Vobornik
25 April	(Austria) Stadion Wiener Neustadt	(West Germany) Georg Gilgenreiner	(West Germany) Alois Wiesböck	(Austria) Hubert Fischbaher

== Third round ==
=== American qualifying ===
- 3 June
- (United States) Santa Clara County Fairgrounds, San Jose
- Top 16 to American Final

=== New Zealand Final ===
- 14 February, Ruapuna Speedway, Templeton
- Top 8 to Australasian final

Pos.	Rider	Total
1	Ivan Mauger	14+3
2	Barry Briggs	14+2
3	Larry Ross	11+3
4	Roy Trigg	11+2
5	Graeme Stapleton	10
6	Paul Fewings	10
7	Colin Tucker	10
8	Colin Farquharson	7
9	Dennis Sincock	6
10	Robin Adlington	6
11	Merv Salt	5
12	Paul Church	4
13	Kevin Burt	3
14	Paul Wells	3
15	Graeme Stewart	3
16	Bruce Mitchell	2
17	Mike Fullerton	1

=== Australian Final ===
- 13 February 1976, Rowley Park Speedway, Adelaide
- Top 8 to Australasian Final

Pos.	Rider	Total
1	Phil Crump	15
2	John Langfield	13
3	Phil Herne	12
4	John Boulger	12
5	Mitch Shirra	10
6	John Titman	9
7	Ticky Day	9
8	Billy Sanders	8
9	Mick McKeon	8
10	Mike Farrell	6
11	Robin Amundson	5
12	Robert Maxfield	4
13	Ron Henderson	3
14	Rod Chessell	3
15	Ray Snider	2
16	Dene Davies	1
17	Paul Scanlon	0

=== Swedish Final ===
- The final was initially started on 20 May at Gubbängens IP but had to be abandoned following the fatal crash of Tommy Jansson.
- 25 May 1976
- Linköping Motorstadion, Linköping
- Top 8 to Nordic final

Placing	Rider	Total	1	2	3	4	5	6	7	8	9	10	11	12	13	14	15	16	17	18	19	20	Pts	Pos
1	(Sweden) (9) Bernt Persson	14			3		3						2					3		3			14	1
2	(Sweden) (14) Anders Michanek	11				X		3					3		3							2	11	2
3	(Sweden) (2) Sören Karlsson	11	3					2				3				2				1			11	3
4	(Sweden) (3) Bengt Jansson	11	2						3				1				3				2		11	4
5	(Sweden) (10) Jan Simensen	10			2			0						3			2		3				10	5
6	(Sweden) (16) Tommy Nilsson	10				3				1	3						1			2			10	6
7	(Sweden) (13) Sören Sjösten	10				2	1							1		3					3		10	7
8	(Sweden) (4) Christer Sjösten	8	F							3				2				0				3	8	8
9	(Sweden) (5) Cal-Erik Claesson	8		3			2					2					0					1	8	9
10	(Sweden) (6) Lars-Like Andersson	6		2				1			2							1			0		6	10
11	(Sweden) (1) Eddie Davidsson	6	1				0				1				2				2				6	11
12	(Sweden) (15) Richard Hellsen	5				0			1			1						2	1				5	12
13	(Sweden) (8) Sven Nilsson	2		0						2			0			0			0				2	13
14	(Sweden) (7) Per-Olof Dovhjort	1		1					-					0	-					0			1	14
15	(Sweden) (11) Bo Wirebrand	1			1				-		0					-						-	1	15
16	(Sweden) (12) Kenneth Selmolsson	1			0					0		0			0						1		1	16
	(Sweden) (17) Bengt Larsson	1							0							1							1	
	(Sweden) (18) Gunnar Malmqvist	3							2						1							0	3	
Placing	Rider	Total	1	2	3	4	5	6	7	8	9	10	11	12	13	14	15	16	17	18	19	20	Pts	Pos

m - exclusion for exceeding two minute time allowance • t - exclusion for touching the tapes • x - other exclusion • e - retired or mechanical failure • f - fell • ns - non-starter • nc - non-classify

gate A - inside	gate B	gate C	gate D - outside

=== Danish Final ===
- 25 April 1976
- (Denmark) Speedway Center, Vojens
- Top 2 to Nordic final

Pos.	Rider	Total
1	Finn Thomsen	15
2	Kurt Bøgh	12+3
3	Jan Henningsen	12+2
4	Leif Rasmusen	12+1
5	Finn Rune Jensen	11
6	Gunnar Svendsen	10
7	Bent Nørregaard-Jensen	10
8	Mike Lohmann	8
9	Kristian Præstbro	8
10	Jens Erik Krause Kjaer	4
11	Knud Ellegaard	4
12	Ernst Bøgh	4
13	Erling Rasmussen	3
14	Godtfred Andreasen	3
15	Jorgen Walther Johansen	2
16	Kaj Kristensen	2

=== Finland Final ===
- Top 1 to Nordic final
- 17 Sep '75,
- (Finland) Kärpänen speedway, Lahti

Pos.	Rider	Total
1	Ilkka Teromaa	15
2	Kai Niemi	13
3	Olli Turkia	12
4	Kari Vuoristo	11
5	Rauli Mäkinen	11
6	Teuvo Sirenius	8
7	Pekka Paljakka	7
8	Esko Mylläri	7
9	Esa Mattila	7
10	Ismo Kivelä (res)	7
11	Pentti Mattila	6
12	Veli Pekka Teromaa	5
13	Matti Vayrynen	4
14	Seppo Palomäki	3
15	Kari Lindevall	2
16	Heikki Ahonen	0
17	Esa Jamsalainen (res)	0

=== Norwegian Final ===
- 25 April 1976
- (Norway) Geiteryggen Speedwaybane, Skien
- First 3 to Nordic Final

Pos.	Rider	Total
1	Reidar Eide	15
2	Dag Lovaas	14
3	Edgard Stangeland	13
4	Audun Ove Olsen	11
5	Øyvind S. Berg	11
6	Jan Terje Gravningen	10
7	Kjell Gimre	9
8	Helge Langli	9
9	Tormod Langli	6
10	Tom Godal	5
11	Ingve Madland	4
12	Stein Pedersen	4
13	Askild Malmin	3
14	Jorn Flatha	2
15	Sigvard Pedersen	2
16	Per Hetland	1

=== British semi-finals ===
- 18 May
- (England) Leicester Stadium, Leicester
- Top 8 to British final

Pos.	Rider	Points
1	Malcolm Simmons	14
2	Bob Kilby	13
3	John Louis	13
4	Dave Jessup	12
5	John Davis	11
6	Reg Wilson	9
7	Chris Morton	9
8	George Hunter	8
9	Gordon Kennett	7
10	Tom Owen	6
11	Arthur Price	5
12	Richard Greer	5
13	Tony Davey	4
14	Alan Molyneux	3
15	Paul Tyrer	1
16	Kevin Holden	0

- 19 May
- (England) White City, London
- Top 8 to British final

Pos.	Rider	Points
1	Peter Collins	15
2	Jim McMillan	14
3	Doug Wyer	12
4	Mike Lanham	11
5	Dave Morton	10
6	Ray Wilson	10
7	Terry Betts	9
8	Chris Pusey	9
9	Michael Lee	8
10	Steve Weatherley	7
11	Frank Auffret	5
12	Arthur Browning	4
13	Dave Perks	3
14	Carl Glover	2
15	Geoff Pusey	1
16	Steve Lomas	0

=== Continental quarter-finals ===
- Top 32 to Continental semi-finals

Date	Venue	Winner	2nd	3rd
15 May	(Czechoslovakia) Trade Union Stadium, Ostrava	(Soviet Union) Mikhail Starostin	(Soviet Union) Vladimir Gordeev	(Soviet Union) Viktor Trofimov
15 May	(Socialist Federal Republic of Yugoslavia) Mladost Stadium, Prelog	(Italy) Giuseppe Marzotto	(Soviet Union) Viktor Kuznetsov	(Bulgaria) Angel Eftimov
16 May	(West Germany) Rottalstadion, Pocking	(West Germany) Egon Müller	(West Germany) Christoph Betzl	(Soviet Union) Valery Gordeev
16 May	(Hungary) Hajdú Volán Stadion, Debrecen	(Czechoslovakia) Vaclav Hejl	(Italy) Paolo Noro	(Czechoslovakia) Václav Verner

== Fourth round ==
=== Continental semi-finals ===
- 30 May
- (West Germany) Breitenthal Speedway Stadium, Krumbach
- Top 8 to Continental final

Pos.	Rider	Points
1	(West Germany) Egon Müller	15
2	(Soviet Union) Valerij Gordeev	11
3	(West Germany) Christoph Betzl	11
4	(Czechoslovakia) Jiří Štancl	11
5	(West Germany) Hans Wassermann	11
6	(Czechoslovakia) Jan Klokocka	10
7	(Soviet Union) Grigory Khlinovsky	9
8	(Soviet Union) Vladimir Smirnov	9
9	(Czechoslovakia) Josef Minarik	8
10	(Soviet Union) Viktor Selivanov	6
11	(Czechoslovakia) Václav Verner	6
12	(Czechoslovakia) Vaclav Hejl	5
13	(Czechoslovakia) Petr Ondrašík	5
14	(Czechoslovakia) Evzen Erban	1
15	(West Germany) Franz Lang	1
16	(Italy) Paulo Noro	1
17	(Italy) Peter Lempenauer (res)	0

- 30 May
- (Poland) Stadion Wybrzeże, Gdańsk
- Top 8 to Continental final

Pos.	Rider	Points
1	(Soviet Union) Viktor Kuznetsov	13
2	(Italy) Giuseppe Marzotto	13
3	(Soviet Union) Vladimir Gordeev	11
4	(Soviet Union) Viktor Trofimov	11
5	(Soviet Union) Nikolaj Kornev	10
6	(Soviet Union) Michail Starostin	10
7	(Czechoslovakia) Jan Hadek	9
8	(Soviet Union) Georgij Ivanov	9
9	(Soviet Union) Sergej Djuchev	8
10	(Austria) Hubert Fischbacher	6
11	(West Germany) Josef Angermüller	4
12	(Czechoslovakia) Emil Sova	4
13	(Soviet Union) Vladimir Paznikov	4
14	(Czechoslovakia) Petr Kucera	3
15	(Czechoslovakia) Jan Verner	3
16	(Bulgaria) Angel Eftimov	1

=== Australasian Final ===
- 21 February 1976
- (New Zealand) Western Springs Stadium, Auckland
- Top 4 to Intercontinental final

Pos.	Rider	Heat Scores	Total
1	(Australia) John Boulger	3,3,2,3,3	14
2	(Australia) Billy Sanders	2,3,3,3,2	13
3	(Australia) Phil Crump	3,3,3,X,3	12
4	(New Zealand) Ivan Mauger	3,2,X,3,3	11+3
5	(Australia) Phil Herne	3,2,1,2,3	11+2
6	(Australia) Mitch Shirra	2,3,2,3,1	11+1
7	(New Zealand) Barry Briggs	X,1,3,2,2	8
8	(Australia) John Titman	X,2,2,2,2	8
9	(Australia) Ricky Day	1,1,3,0,1	6
10	(New Zealand) Colin Tucker	2,2,1,0,0	5
11	(New Zealand) Colin Farqhuarson	1,E,1,2,1	5
12	(Australia) John Langfield	X,1,2,1,0	4
13	(New Zealand) Larry Ross	2,1,0,1,E	4
14	(New Zealand) Graeme Stapleton	0,0,E,1,2	3
15	(New Zealand) Roy Trigg	1,0,0,0,1	2
16	(New Zealand) Paul Fewlings	0,0,1,0,0	1
R1	(New Zealand) Dennis Sincock		1
R2	(New Zealand) Robin Adlington		1

=== American Final ===
- 4 June
- (United States) Cal-Expo Rodeo Arena, Sacramento
- Winner to Intercontinental Final, Autrey won a three rider race-off

Pos.	Rider	Total
1	Scott Autrey	?+3
2	William Mike Curoco	?+2
3	Steve Gresham	?+1

=== British Final ===
- 2 June 1976
- (England) Brandon Stadium, Coventry
- First 5 to Intercontinental Final

Placing	Rider	Total	1	2	3	4	5	6	7	8	9	10	11	12	13	14	15	16	17	18	19	20	Pts	Pos
1	(England) (9) Malcolm Simmons	15			3		3						3					3		3			15	1
2	(England) (3) Chris Morton	13	2						3				2				3				3		13	2
3	(England) (6) Doug Wyer	13		3				3			3							2			2		13	3
4	(England) (12) Peter Collins	12			2					3		3			3						1		12	4
5	(England) (5) John Louis	11		2			2					2					2					3	11	5
6	(England) (7) Dave Jessup	10		1					2					3	2					2			10	6
7	(Scotland) (2) Jim McMillan	8	3					1				1				3				0			8	7
8	(England) (15) Terry Betts	7				3			1			0						0	3				7	8
9	(England) (13) Ray Wilson	5				2	1							0		2					0		5	9
10	(England) (11) Bob Kilby	5			1				0		2					1						1	5	10
11	(England) (16) John Davis	5				0				2	1						1			1			5	11
12	(England) (10) Dave Morton	4			0			2						2			0		0				4	12
13	(Scotland) (14) George Hunter	4				1		0					0		1							2	4	13
14	(England) (1) Mike Lanham	3	1				0				0				0				2				3	14
15	(England) (4) Reg Wilson	3	0							1				1				1				0	3	15
16	(England) (8) Chris Pusey	2		0						0			1			0			1				2	16
R1	(England) (R1) John Harrhy	0																					0	R1
Placing	Rider	Total	1	2	3	4	5	6	7	8	9	10	11	12	13	14	15	16	17	18	19	20	Pts	Pos

m - exclusion for exceeding two minute time allowance • t - exclusion for touching the tapes • x - other exclusion • e - retired or mechanical failure • f - fell • ns - non-starter • nc - non-classify

gate A - inside	gate B	gate C	gate D - outside

=== Nordic Final ===
- 2 June 1976
- (Sweden) Norrköping Motorstadion, Norrköping
- Top 6 to Intercontinental final

Placing	Rider	Total	1	2	3	4	5	6	7	8	9	10	11	12	13	14	15	16	17	18	19	20	Pts	Pos	21
1	(Denmark) (4) Ole Olsen	14	3							3				3				3				2	14	1	
2	(Sweden) (14) Anders Michanek	13				3		3					3		3							1	13	2	
3	(Sweden) (10) Bengt Jansson	12			3			2						1			3		3				12	3	
4	(Norway) (12) Dag Lovaas	11			2					2		3			1						3		11	4	
5	(Sweden) (7) Bernt Persson	10		3					0					2	2					3			10	5	
6	(Sweden) (5) Sören Sjösten	10		2			1					2					2					3	10	6	
7	(Sweden) (6) Sören Karlsson	8		1				0			3							2			2		8	7	3
8	(Norway) (13) Edgar Stangeland	8				2	3							0		2					1		8	8	2
9	(Finland) (2) Ila Teromaa	8	2					1				0				3				2			8	9	1
10	(Denmark) (3) Finn Thomsen	6	0						3				2				1				0		6	10	
11	(Norway) (1) Reidar Eide	6	1				2				2				0				1				6	11	
12	(Sweden) (15) Tommy Nilsson	5				0			2			1						0	2				5	12	
13	(Finland) (11) Markku Helminen	4			1				1		1					1						0	4	13	
14	(Sweden) (9) Karl Erik Claesson	2			0		0						0					1		1			2	14	
15	(Sweden) (8) Jan Simensen	1		0						1			-			0			0				1	15	
16	(Sweden) (16) Christer Sjösten	1				1				0	0						0			0			1	16	
R1	(Sweden) (R1) Lars-Åke Andersson	1											1										1	R1	
R2	(Sweden) (R2) Thomas Pettersson	0																					0	R2	
Placing	Rider	Total	1	2	3	4	5	6	7	8	9	10	11	12	13	14	15	16	17	18	19	20	Pts	Pos	21

m - exclusion for exceeding two minute time allowance • t - exclusion for touching the tapes • x - other exclusion • e - retired or mechanical failure • f - fell • ns - non-starter • nc - non-classify

gate A - inside	gate B	gate C	gate D - outside

== Fifth round ==
=== Intercontinental Final ===
- 26 June 1976
- (England) Wembley Stadium, London
- First 8 to World Final

Placing	Rider	Total	1	2	3	4	5	6	7	8	9	10	11	12	13	14	15	16	17	18	19	20	Pts	Pos
1	(England) (11) Peter Collins	12+3			0				3		3					3						3	12	1
2	(New Zealand) (9) Ivan Mauger	12+2			1		3						2					3		3			12	2
3	(Australia) (1) Phil Crump	11+3	3				1				2				2				3				11	3
4	(England) (7) Malcolm Simmons	11+2		3					0					3	3					2			11	4
5	(England) (8) Chris Morton	10		2						2			3			1			2				10	5
6	(England) (5) Doug Wyer	10		1			2					3					2					2	10	6
7	(United States) (10) Scott Autrey	9			2			2						1			3		1				9	7
8	(England) (6) John Louis	8+3		0				3			0							2			3		8	8
9	(Sweden) (16) Anders Michanek	8+2				3				3	1						0			1			8	9
10	(Australia) (12) John Boulger	7			3					1		2			1						T		7	10
11	(Australia) (3) Billy Sanders	7	2						2				1				1				1		7	11
12	(Denmark) (13) Ole Olsen	6				X	E							2		2					2		6	12
13	(Sweden) (15) Bengt Jansson	4				2			1			1						X	0				4	13
14	(Sweden) (4) Bernt Persson	3	1							0				0				1				1	3	14
15	(Norway) (2) Dag Lovaas	1	0					1				0				0				0			1	15
16	(Sweden) (14) Sören Sjösten	1				1		0					E		-							-	1	16
	(England) (17) Trevor Geer	0													0							0	0	
	(England) (18) Barry Thomas	0																			0		0	
Placing	Rider	Total	1	2	3	4	5	6	7	8	9	10	11	12	13	14	15	16	17	18	19	20	Pts	Pos

m - exclusion for exceeding two minute time allowance • t - exclusion for touching the tapes • x - other exclusion • e - retired or mechanical failure • f - fell • ns - non-starter • nc - non-classify

gate A - inside	gate B	gate C	gate D - outside

=== Continental Final ===
- 20 June 1976
- (Soviet Union) Leningrad Speedway Stadium, Leningrad

Placing	Rider	Total	1	2	3	4	5	6	7	8	9	10	11	12	13	14	15	16	17	18	19	20	Pts	Pos
1	(West Germany) (6) Egon Müller	9		3				3			3												9	1
2	(Czechoslovakia) (4) Jiří Štancl	8	3							3				2									8	2
3	(Soviet Union) (9) Valery Gordeev	7			1		3						3										7	3
4	(Soviet Union) (7) Vladimir Gordeev	7		1					3					3									7	4
5	(Soviet Union) (11) Grigory Khlinovsky	6			2				2		2												6	5
6	(Soviet Union) (14) Georgy Ivanov	6				3		1					2										6	6
7	(Czechoslovakia) (12) Jan Hadek	6			3					1		2											6	7
8	(Soviet Union) (15) Viktor Kuznetsov	4				0			1			3											4	8
9	(Soviet Union) (13) Nikolay Kornev	4				2	2							0									4	9
10	(Soviet Union) (5) Vladimir Smirnov	4		2			1					1											4	10
11	(Soviet Union) (16) Viktor Trofimov	4				1				2	1												4	11
12	(Italy) (10) Giuseppe Marzotto	3			0			2						1									3	12
13	(West Germany) (2) Hans Wassermann	2	2					0				0											2	13
14	(West Germany) (8) Christoph Betzl	1		0						0			1										1	14
15	(Czechoslovakia) (3) Jan Klokocka	1	1						0				0										1	15
16	(Soviet Union) (1) Mikhail Starostin	0	0				0				0												0	16
R1	(Soviet Union) (R1) Sergey Dyuzhev	0																					0	R1
R2	(Czechoslovakia) (R2) Josef Minarik	0																					0	R2
Placing	Rider	Total	1	2	3	4	5	6	7	8	9	10	11	12	13	14	15	16	17	18	19	20	Pts	Pos

m - exclusion for exceeding two minute time allowance • t - exclusion for touching the tapes • x - other exclusion • e - retired or mechanical failure • f - fell • ns - non-starter • nc - non-classify

gate A - inside	gate B	gate C	gate D - outside

== World Final ==
- 5 September 1976
- (Poland) Silesian Stadium, Chorzów
- Top 8 to World final & 1 reserve

Placing	Rider	Total	1	2	3	4	5	6	7	8	9	10	11	12	13	14	15	16	17	18	19	20	Pts	Pos
1	(England) (11) Peter Collins	14			3				3		3					3						2	14	1
2	(England) (15) Malcolm Simmons	13				2			2			3						3	3				13	2
3	(Australia) (13) Phil Crump	12				3	3							2		1					3		12	3
4	(New Zealand) (5) Ivan Mauger	11		3			E					2					3					3	11	4
5	(Poland) (9) Zenon Plech	11			1		2						3					2		3			11	5
6	(England) (7) John Louis	9		2					1					1	3					2			9	6
7	(England) (10) Doug Wyer	8			0			3						3			1		1				8	7
8	(West Germany) (1) Egon Müller	8	3				1				2				2				F				8	8
9	(United States) (2) Scott Autrey	7	2					2				1				2				0			7	9
10	(Czechoslovakia) (12) Jiří Štancl	6			2					2		0			1						1		6	10
11	(England) (16) Chris Morton	6				1				1	1						2			1			6	11
12	(Poland) (6) Edward Jancarz	5		1				1			0							1			2		5	12
13	(Poland) (4) Marek Cieślak	4	0							3				0				E				1	4	13
14	(Poland) (3) Jerzy Rembas	3	1						0				2				0				0		3	14
15	(Soviet Union) (8) Valery Gordeev	1		0						0			1			0			X				1	15
16	(Soviet Union) (14) Vladimir Gordeev	0				0		0					0		0							0	0	16
R1	(Sweden) (R1) Anders Michanek	2																	2				2	R1
R2	(Soviet Union) (R2) Grigory Khlinovsky	0																					0	R2
Placing	Rider	Total	1	2	3	4	5	6	7	8	9	10	11	12	13	14	15	16	17	18	19	20	Pts	Pos

m - exclusion for exceeding two minute time allowance • t - exclusion for touching the tapes • x - other exclusion • e - retired or mechanical failure • f - fell • ns - non-starter • nc - non-classify

gate A - inside	gate B	gate C	gate D - outside
