= 1976 Intercontinental final =

1976 Intercontinental Final

Seasons
- ← 1975 1977 →

The 1976 Intercontinental Final was the second running of the Intercontinental Final as part of the qualification for the 1976 Speedway World Championship. From 1976 it replaced the European Final as the last qualifying stage for riders from Scandinavia, the USA and from the Commonwealth nations

The Final took place at the famous Wembley Stadium in London. England's "Golden Boy" Peter Collins defeated then four-time World Champion Ivan Mauger in a runoff to claim the Final and go into the World Final at the Silesian Stadium in Chorzów, Poland as the clear favourite. Collins' form would continue in Chorzów as he would go on to win his only individual World Championship. After both riders finished the Intercontinental Final on 11 points, Australia's Phil Crump defeated England's Malcolm Simmons in a runoff for third place.

The surprise of the meeting was reigning World Champion Ole Olsen who sensationally failed to qualify for the World Final. Nearly always a strong performer at Wembley, on this occasion Olsen could only score 6 points from his five rides to finish in 12th place. The other surprise was 1974 World Champion Anders Michanek who had finished runner-up to Olsen in the World Final at Wembley in 1975. Michanek was defeated in a runoff by England's John Louis for 8th place and the last spot in the World Final. As a result, the Swede would only be a reserve in Poland.

== 1976 Intercontinental Final ==
- 26 June
- (United Kingdom) London, Wembley Stadium
- Referee:
- Qualification: Top 8 plus 1 reserve to the World Final in Chorzów, Poland.

Pos.	Rider	Total
1	(England) Peter Collins	12+3
2	(New Zealand) Ivan Mauger	12+2
3	(Australia) Phil Crump	11+3
4	(England) Malcolm Simmons	11+2
5	(England) Chris Morton	10
6	(England) Doug Wyer	10
7	(United States) Scott Autrey	9
8	(England) John Louis	8+3
9	(Sweden) Anders Michanek	8+2
10	(Australia) John Boulger	7
11	(Australia) Billy Sanders	7
12	(Denmark) Ole Olsen	6
13	(Sweden) Bengt Jansson	4
14	(Sweden) Bernt Persson	3
15	(Norway) Dag Lovaas	1
16	(Sweden) Soren Sjosten	
17	(England) Trevor Geer (Res)	0
18	(England) Barry Thomas (Res)	0

== Classification ==
Placing	Rider	Total	1	2	3	4	5	6	7	8	9	10	11	12	13	14	15	16	17	18	19	20	Pts	Pos
1	(England) (11) Peter Collins	12+3			0				3		3					3						3	12	1
2	(New Zealand) (9) Ivan Mauger	12+2			1		3						2					3		3			12	2
3	(Australia) (1) Phil Crump	11+3	3				1				2				2				3				11	3
4	(England) (7) Malcolm Simmons	11+2		3					0					3	3					2			11	4
5	(England) (8) Chris Morton	10		2						2			3			1			2				10	5
6	(England) (5) Doug Wyer	10		1			2					3					2					2	10	6
7	(United States) (10) Scott Autrey	9			2			2						1			3		1				9	7
8	(England) (6) John Louis	8+3		0				3			0							2			3		8	8
9	(Sweden) (16) Anders Michanek	8+2				3				3	1						0			1			8	9
10	(Australia) (12) John Boulger	7			3					1		2			1						T		7	10
11	(Australia) (3) Billy Sanders	7	2						2				1				1				1		7	11
12	(Denmark) (13) Ole Olsen	6				X	E							2		2					2		6	12
13	(Sweden) (15) Bengt Jansson	4				2			1			1						X	0				4	13
14	(Sweden) (4) Bernt Persson	3	1							0				0				1				1	3	14
15	(Norway) (2) Dag Lovaas	1	0					1				0				0				0			1	15
16	(Sweden) (14) Soren Sjosten	1				1		0					E		-							-	1	16
	(England) (17) Trevor Geer	0													0							0	0	
	(England) (18) Barry Thomas	0																			0		0	
Placing	Rider	Total	1	2	3	4	5	6	7	8	9	10	11	12	13	14	15	16	17	18	19	20	Pts	Pos

m - exclusion for exceeding two minute time allowance • t - exclusion for touching the tapes • x - other exclusion • e - retired or mechanical failure • f - fell • ns - non-starter • nc - non-classify

gate A - inside	gate B	gate C	gate D - outside

== See also ==
- Motorcycle Speedway
