= 1975 Intercontinental final =

1975 Intercontinental Final

Seasons
- ← none 1976 →

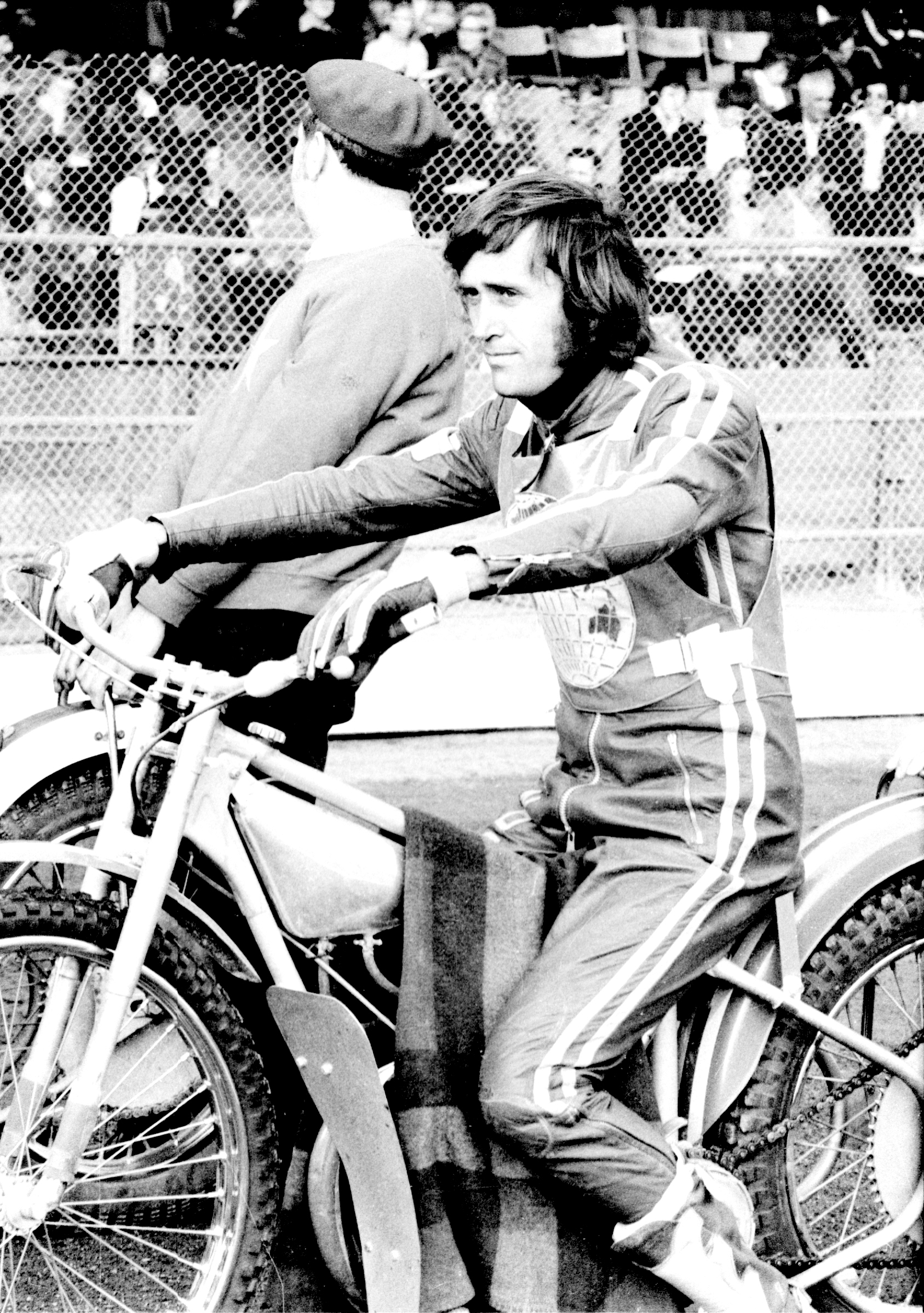
Anders Michanek during the 1975 Intercontinental Final

The 1975 Intercontinental Final was the inaugural Intercontinental Final, introduced for Motorcycle speedway riders as part of the qualification for the 1975 Speedway World Championship.

Four time World Champion Ivan Mauger became the first Intercontinental Final winner, defeating reigning World Champion Anders Michanek by two points at the Ullevi Stadium in Gothenburg. Another Swede Bernt Persson defeated Ole Olsen in a runoff for third place. Later in the year Olsen would go on to win his second World title at London's Wembley Stadium.

== 1975 Intercontinental Final ==
- 3 June
- (Sweden) Gothenburg, Ullevi
- Qualification: Top 8 plus 1 reserve to the European Final in Bydgoszcz, Poland.

Pos.	Rider	Total
1	(New Zealand) Ivan Mauger	14
2	(Sweden) Anders Michanek	12
3	(Sweden) Bernt Persson	11+3
4	(Denmark) Ole Olsen	11+2
5	(United States) Scott Autrey	9
6	(Sweden) Tommy Jansson	9
7	(Norway) Reidar Eide	8+3
8	(Australia) Phil Crump	8+2
9	(Sweden) Tommy Johansson	8+1
10	(Norway) Dag Lovaas	7
11	(Australia) John Boulger	4
12	(Australia) Billy Sanders	4
13	(Sweden) Bengt Jansson	4
14	(Sweden) Hasse Holmqvist	4
15	(United States) Steven Gresham	3
16	(Sweden) Jan Andersson (Res)	2
17	(New Zealand) Barry Briggs	1
18	(Sweden) Kenneth Selmonsson (Res)	0

== Classification ==
Placing	Rider	Total	1	2	3	4	5	6	7	8	9	10	11	12	13	14	15	16	17	18	19	20	Pts	Pos
1	(New Zealand) (2) Ivan Mauger	14	2					3				3				3				3			14	1
2	(Sweden) (11) Anders Michanek	12			2				3		3					1						3	12	2
3	(Sweden) (13) Bernt Persson	11+3				3	3							0		2					3		11	3
4	(Denmark) (1) Ole Olsen	11+2	3				1				2				2				3				11	4
5	(United States) (6) Scott Autrey	9		3				2			1							2			1		9	5
6	(Sweden) (9) Tommy Jansson	9			3		2						2					1		1			9	6
7	(Norway) (14) Reidar Eide	8+3				2		1					3		0							2	8	7
8	(Australia) (3) Phil Crump	8+2	1						2				1				2				2		8	8
9	(Sweden) (7) Tommy Johansson	8+1		1					0					2	3					2			8	9
10	(Norway) (4) Dag Lovaas	7	0							3				1				3				0	7	10
11	(Australia) (12) John Boulger	4			1					0		2			1						0		4	11
12	(Australia) (8) Billy Sanders	4		0						2			0			0			2				4	12
13	(Sweden) (16) Bengt Jansson	4				0				1	0						3			0			4	13
14	(Sweden) (5) Hasse Holmqvist	4		2			0					1					0					1	4	14
15	(United States) (10) Steven Gresham	3			0			0						3			0		F				3	15
16	(New Zealand) (15) Barry Briggs	1				1			-			-						-	-				1	16
	(Sweden) (17) Kenneth Selmonsson	0																					0	
	(Sweden) (18) Jan Andersson	2							1			0						0	1				2	
Placing	Rider	Total	1	2	3	4	5	6	7	8	9	10	11	12	13	14	15	16	17	18	19	20	Pts	Pos

m - exclusion for exceeding two minute time allowance • t - exclusion for touching the tapes • x - other exclusion • e - retired or mechanical failure • f - fell • ns - non-starter • nc - non-classify

gate A - inside	gate B	gate C	gate D - outside

== See also ==
- Sport in Sweden
- Motorcycle Speedway
