= 1978 Intercontinental final =

1978 Intercontinental Final

Seasons
- ← 1977 1979 →

The 1978 Intercontinental Final was the fourth running of the Intercontinental Final as part of the qualification for the 1978 Speedway World Championship. The 1978 Final was run on 2 June at the Fredericia Speedway Center in Fredericia, Denmark, and was the last qualifying stage for riders from Scandinavia, the USA and from the Commonwealth nations for the World Final to be held at the Wembley Stadium in London, England (as the World Final was in England, riders from the United Kingdom were only required to qualify through the British Final held in August).

In a battle of the masters, reigning and five time World Champion Ivan Mauger went head to head with Denmark's own two time World Champion Ole Olsen. The Dane emerged victorious, defeating his friend and mentor in a runoff to claim the Final after both had finished the meeting on 13 points. Finishing in a surprise third place was American Scott Autrey who defeated Finland's Ilka Teromaa and Sweden's rising star Jan Andersson in a runoff to claim the final place on the podium. Before the meeting, Autrey had been expected to do well enough to qualify for the World Final, but wasn't expected to claim a podium finish.

Ole Olsen would later go on to win his third World title at Wembley.

== 1978 Intercontinental Final ==
- 2 July
- (Denmark) Fredericia, Fredericia Speedway Center
- Referee:
- Qualification: Top 7 plus 1 reserve to the World Final in London, England.

Pos.	Rider	Total
1	(Denmark) Ole Olsen	13+3
2	(New Zealand) Ivan Mauger	13+2
3	(United States) Scott Autrey	11+3
4	(Finland) Ila Teromaa	11+2
5	(Sweden) Jan Andersson	11+1
6	(Sweden) Anders Michanek	10
7	(Australia) John Titman	10
8	(Sweden) Bernt Persson	9
9	(Finland) Kai Niemi	8
10	(United States) Steve Gresham	7
11	(Denmark) Finn Thomsen	6
12	(Australia) Mike Farrell	5
13	(Australia) Mick McKeon	3
14	(Denmark) Kristian Praestbro	2
15	(New Zealand) Mitch Shirra	1
16	(Sweden) Tommy Nilsson	1

== See also ==
- Motorcycle Speedway
