= Josef Aigner =

West German speedway rider

- Born: 19 June 1959 (age 67); Olching, West Germany
- Nationality: German

Career history

West Germany
- 1980: Olching

Individual honours
- 1982: West German Champion
- 1980: World Long Track bronze medal
- 1981, 1982, 1984: World Long Track finalist

Josef Aigner (born 19 June 1959) is a former international speedway rider from West Germany.

== Speedway career ==
Aigner was a champion of West Germany, winning the West German Championship in 1982.

Aigner has also reached the final of the Individual Speedway Long Track World Championship on four occasions in 1980, 1981, 1982 and 1984. He won a bronze medal in the 1980 final.

== World final appearances ==
=== World Longtrack Championship ===
- 1980 – (Germany) Scheeßel 3rd 16pts
- 1981 – (Socialist Federal Republic of Yugoslavia) Gornja Radgona 7th 13pts
- 1982 – (Denmark) Esbjerg 15th 4pts
- 1984 – (West Germany) Herxheim 14th 5pts
