= 1977 Intercontinental final =

1977 Intercontinental Final

Seasons
- ← 1976 1978 →

The 1977 Intercontinental Final was the third running of the Intercontinental Final as part of the qualification for the 1977 Speedway World Championship. The 1977 Final was run on 21 August at the White City Stadium in London, England, and the last qualifying stage for riders from Scandinavia, the USA and from the Commonwealth nations, though as the World Final was held at the Ullevi stadium in Gothenburg, Sweden, the Swedish riders qualified for the World Final through the Swedish Final held in June.

Reigning World Champion Peter Collins put in an almost flawless performance to claim his second straight Intercontinental Final with a 15-point maximum, though he did make it hard on himself with some poor gating followed by some brilliant riding. Ole Olsen bounced back from his 1976 Intercontinental Final failure by finishing second, while in a battle of the youngsters, 21-year-old Australian Billy Sanders defeated England's 18-year-old British Champion Michael Lee in a runoff for third place after both riders finished on 12 points.

Ivan Mauger, who finished in 5th place at White City, would go on to win the World Championship in Sweden. It was to be his 5th World title win equalling the record held by Sweden's Ove Fundin who was on hand to congratulate the New Zealand rider.

== 1977 Intercontinental Final ==
- 21 August
- (United Kingdom) London, White City Stadium
- Referee:
- Qualification: Top 7 to the World Final in Gothenburg, Sweden.

| Pos. | Rider | Total |
|---|---|---|
| 1 | (England) Peter Collins | 15 |
| 2 | (Denmark) Ole Olsen | 13 |
| 3 | (Australia) Billy Sanders | 12+3 |
| 4 | (England) Michael Lee | 12+2 |
| 5 | (New Zealand) Ivan Mauger | 9 |
| 6 | (Australia) John Boulger | 9 |
| 7 | (Denmark) Finn Thomsen | 8 |
| 8 | (England) John Davis | 7+3 |
| 9 | (England) Dave Jessup | 7+2 |
| 10 | (Finland) Ilka Teromaa | 6 |
| 11 | (England) Doug Wyer | 6 |
| 12 | (Finland) Kai Niemi | 5 |
| 13 | (England) Keith White | 4 |
| 14 | (United States) Bruce Penhall | 3 |
| 15 | (Australia) Phil Crump | 2 |
| 16 | (United States) Mike Bast | 1 |

== See also ==
- Motorcycle Speedway
