= 1977 Speedway World Pairs Championship =

8th official edition of the World motorcycle speedway Pairs Championship

1977 World Pairs Championship

Seasons
- ← 1976 1978 →

The 1977 Speedway World Pairs Championship was the eighth FIM Speedway World Pairs Championship. The final took place in Manchester, England and was sponsored by Kawasaki. The championship was won by host England (28 points) who beat Sweden and West Germany (both 18 points).

== Semifinal 1 ==
- (Italy) Santa Marina Stadium, Lonigo
- 12 June

Placing	Pair / Rider Name	Total	1	2	3	4	5	6	7	8	9	10	11	12	13	14	15	16	17	18	19	20	21
1	Sweden	25							8							17							25
1	(13) Bernt Persson	14				3			2			3				2			3		1
1	(14) Anders Michanek	11				2			1			1				3			2		2
2	New Zealand	23							6							13							23
2	(11) Ivan Mauger	18			3				3				3		3			3					3
2	(12) Larry Ross	5			0				0				0		1			2					2
3	Czechoslovakia	21							8							13							21
3	(9) Jan Verner	12			1			3				2		1			3					2
3	(10) Jiří Štancl	9			2			2				0		2			0					3
4	Poland	20							8							16							20
4	(3) Edward Jancarz	12	3				3				2			X				1			3
4	(4) Marek Cieślak	8	2				X				3			3				E			F
5	Italy	17							2							10							17
5	(1) Giuseppe Marzotto	10	0			0				3			2				2			3
5	(2) Francesco Biginato	7	1			1				2			1				1			1
6	Hungary	11							6							9							11
6	(5) Laszlo Meszaros	1		0			1			0					0				0			0
6	(6) Herbert Szerecs	10		3			2			1					2				1			1
7	Austria	9							4							6							9
7	(7) Adi Funk	8		2				1			1					1				2			1
7	(8) Hubert Fischbacher	1		1				0			0					0				0			0
Placing	Pair / Rider Name	Total	1	2	3	4	5	6	7	8	9	10	11	12	13	14	15	16	17	18	19	20	21

m - exclusion for exceeding two minute time allowance • t - exclusion for touching the tapes • x - other exclusion • e - retired or mechanical failure • f - fell
ns - non-starter • nc - non-classify

gate A - inside	gate B	gate C	gate D - outside

== Semifinal 2 ==
- (West Germany) Rottalstadion, Pocking
- 12 June

Pos.	Team	Rider	Points
1st	West Germany (25 pts)	Egon Müller	16
1st	West Germany (25 pts)	Hans Wassermann	10
2nd	Australia (24 pts)	Billy Sanders	14
2nd	Australia (24 pts)	Phil Crump	10
3rd	Finland (21 pts)	Ila Teromaa	14
3rd	Finland (21 pts)	Kai Niemi	7
4	Denmark (18 pts)	Ole Olsen	12
4	Denmark (18 pts)	Finn Thomsen	6
5	Netherlands (17 pts)	Henny Kroeze	13
5	Netherlands (17 pts)	Henk Steman	4
6	Norway (10 pts)	Tormod Langli	5
6	Norway (10 pts)	Jan Terje Gravningen	5
7	West Germany B (9 pts)	Christoph Betzl	7
7	West Germany B (9 pts)	Fritz Lang	2

== World final ==
- (England) Hyde Road, Manchester
- 2 July

Placing	Pair / Rider Name	Total	1	2	3	4	5	6	7	8	9	10	11	12	13	14	15	16	17	18	19	20	21
1	England	28							10							20							28
1	(5) Peter Collins	15		3			3			3					3				1			2
1	(6) Malcolm Simmons	13		2			2			2					2				2			3
2	Sweden	18							7							11							18
2	(1) Anders Michanek	16+3	3			3				1			3				3			3
2	(2) Bernt Persson	2	X			1				0			0				E			1
3	West Germany	18							4							14							18
3	(3) Egon Müller	11+2	2				1				3			3				2			0
3	(4) Hans Wassermann	7	1				0				2			2				X			2
4	Czechoslovakia	17							9							13							17
4	(9) Jiří Štancl	11			3			3				2		X			2					1
4	(10) Jan Verner	6			1			2				1		1			1					0
5	New Zealand	17							5							10							17
5	(13) Ivan Mauger	16				2			3			3				2			3		3
5	(14) Larry Ross	1				0			0			0				0			0		1
6	Finland	14							5							9							14
6	(11) Ila Teromaa	7			2				2				1		0			F					2
6	(12) Kai Niemi	7			0				1				2		1			3					0
7	Australia	12							1							6							12
7	(7) Phil Crump	10		1				E			1					3				2			3
7	(8) Billy Sanders	2		E				-			X					1				0			1
Placing	Pair / Rider Name	Total	1	2	3	4	5	6	7	8	9	10	11	12	13	14	15	16	17	18	19	20	21

m - exclusion for exceeding two minute time allowance • t - exclusion for touching the tapes • x - other exclusion • e - retired or mechanical failure • f - fell
ns - non-starter • nc - non-classify

gate A - inside	gate B	gate C	gate D - outside

== See also ==
- 1977 Individual Speedway World Championship
- 1977 Speedway World Team Cup
- motorcycle speedway
- 1977 in sports
