= 1982 Individual Long Track World Championship =

Long track motorcycle racing event

The 1982 Individual Long Track World Championship was the 12th edition of the FIM speedway Individual Long Track World Championship. The event was held on 19 September 1982 at the Korskro Motor Center in Esbjerg in Denmark.

The world title was won by Karl Maier of West Germany for the second time.

== Final Classification ==
Pos	Rider	Heat Pts	Heat Pts	Heat Pts	Heat Pts	Heat Pts	Total Pts
1	(West Germany) Karl Maier	4	5	5	5	5	24
2	(West Germany) Alois Wiesböck	5	5	5	4	3	22
3	(West Germany) Egon Müller	3	4	5	5	4	21
4	(West Germany) Georg Gilgenreiner	1	5	4	3	2	15
5	(England) Peter Collins	5	3	4	3	0	15
6	(New Zealand) Ivan Mauger	5	1	3	4	1	14
7	(Denmark) Ole Olsen	3	4	2	2	E	11
8	(Sweden) Anders Michanek	2	2	3	2	E	9
9	(Denmark) Hans Nielsen	0	3	4	1	E	8
10	(West Germany) Christoph Betzl	1	2	3	1	E	7
11	(West Germany) Georg Hack	2	3	2	0	E	7
12	(Switzerland) Marcel Gerhard	1	4	1	0	E	6
13	(England) Simon Wigg	4	1	ef	E	E	5
14	(England) Chris Morton	0	2	2	E	E	4
15	(West Germany) Josef Aigner	2	1	1	E	E	4
16	(United States) Bobby Schwartz	4	0	f/x	E	E	4
17	(Czechoslovakia) Jiří Štancl	3	0	1	E	E	4
18	(England) Phil Collins	0	0	ef	E	E	0

- E = eliminated (no further ride)
- f = fell
- ef = engine failure
- x = excluded
