= Fredericia Speedway Stadium =

Former stadium in Fredericia, Denmark

Fredericia Stadium
- Location: Baldersparken 31, 7000 Fredericia, Denmark
- Coordinates: 55°34′23″N 9°45′34″E
- Owner: Fredericia Municipality
- Opened: 1967
- Closed: 1987
- Length: 0.37 km (0.23 mi)

Fredericia Speedway Stadium (Danish: Fredericia Stadion) was a speedway track in the centre of Fredericia, Denmark. The track was located between the Baldersvej and Nymarksvej roads, where the present day housing estate of Baldersparken stands. The stadium was a significant venue for major speedway events, including the final of the 1987 Speedway World Team Cup.

== History ==
The stadium opened in 1967, with the Fredericia Motor Klub organising the speedway meetings. The stadium hosted the speedway team known as the Fredericia Speedway, who raced in the Danish Speedway League and were champions of Denmark in 1974 and 1975, while based at the stadium.

In addition to the World Team Cup final the stadium hosted-

List of major meetings

- 13 August 1967, Nordic team final round of the 1967 Speedway World Team Cup.
- 20 June 1971, Nordic team final of the 1971 Speedway World Team Cup.
- 26 September 1971, Danish Championship final.
- 24 June 1973, Nordic team final of the 1973 Speedway World Team Cup.
- 4 August 1974, British-Nordic-American final.
- 5 September 1974, Danish Championship final.
- 25 May 1975, World Pairs Championship semifinal.
- 19 May 1977, Danish World Championship qualification.
- 31 May 1977, Danish Championship final.
- 2 July 1978, 1978 Intercontinental final.
- 23 September 1979, Danish Championship final.
- 19 August 1985, Danish Championship final.

On 16 August 1987, Jan O. Pedersen recorded a new track record, which would also be the last.

Due to its central location in the town and noise levels, the venue was limited to the number of meetings that could be held. The same problem eventually caused the track to close in late 1987 and lay idle for over twenty years. It was later sold to a private developer and demolished for housing.
