= Olching Bird Park =

- Interactive map of Olching Bird Park
- 48°12′30″N 11°19′15″E
- Date opened: 1982
- Location: Olching, Germany
- Land area: 2 hectares (4.9 acres)
- No. of animals: 600
- No. of species: 150
- Website: https://www.vogelpark-olching.de

Olching Bird Park (German: Birdpark Olching) is located in Olching, 20 km north west of Munich. On an area of 20,000 m^{2}, a wide range of different species can be found: from the little tiger finch to cranes, storks and many brightly coloured parrots.

The amazing area of the so-called Amper river is a particular feature that distinguishes the park from others. All aviaries have natural plants which underline the naturalness of the park. A main objective of the park association is the breeding of native birds and a large zone is defined as a retreat for the local wildlife.

For the visitors there is also a typical Bavarian beer garden in the park as well as a playground for younger guests. The operator of the bird park is the Bird Lover's Association of Olching.

== History ==
The Bird Association of Olching was founded in 1968 and has 120 members. AT the beginning the area was privately used - only by the birders for their ever-growing collection. In 1982 the park was opened to the public. Dogs are permitted. Guided tours may be arranged on request.
