= 1978 Speedway World Pairs Championship =

9th edition of the World motorcycle speedway Pairs Championship

1978 World Pairs Championship

Seasons
- ← 1977 1979 →

The 1978 Speedway World Pairs Championship was the ninth FIM Speedway World Pairs Championship. The final took place in Chorzów, [oland. The championship was won by England who beat New Zealand after Run-Off (both 24 points). Bronze medal was won by Denmark (21 points).

== Semifinal 1 ==
- (Norway) Geiteryggen Speedwaybane, Skien
- 11 June

Pos.	Team	Rider	Points
1st	Denmark (28 pts)	Ole Olsen	17
1st	Denmark (28 pts)	Finn Thomsen	11
2nd	New Zealand (25 pts)	Ivan Mauger	14
2nd	New Zealand (25 pts)	Larry Ross	11
3rd	Sweden (22 pts)	Anders Michanek	15
3rd	Sweden (22 pts)	Jan Andersson	7
4	Australia (17 pts)	Phil Crump	11
4	Australia (17 pts)	Phil Herne	6
5	Finland (15 pts)	Ila Teromaa	10
5	Finland (15 pts)	Kai Niemi	5
6	Netherlands (12 pts)	Henny Kroeze	6
6	Netherlands (12 pts)	Rudi Muts	6
7	Norway (6 pts)	Audun Ove Olsen	5
7	Norway (6 pts)	Trond Helge Skretting	1

== Semifinal 2 ==
- (Hungary) Gázvezeték Street Sports Complex, Debrecen
- 11 June

Pos.	Team	Rider	Points
1st	England (30 pts)	Malcolm Simmons	15
1st	England (30 pts)	Gordon Kennett	15
2nd	Czechoslovakia (24 pts)	Jiří Štancl	13
2nd	Czechoslovakia (24 pts)	Jan Verner	11
3rd	West Germany (22 pts)	Hans Wassermann	16
3rd	West Germany (22 pts)	Georg Hack	6
4	Italy (17 pts)	Giuseppe Marzotto	11
4	Italy (17 pts)	Mauro Ferracioli	6
5	Hungary (16 pts)	Istvan Sziraczky	12
5	Hungary (16 pts)	Janos Oresko	4
6	Austria (10 pts)	Adi Funk	7
6	Austria (10 pts)	Walter Grubmuller	3
7	Yugoslavia (3 pts)	Djuro Fleten	2
7	Yugoslavia (3 pts)	Josef Mauser	1

== World final ==
- (Poland) Silesian Stadium, Chorzów
- 25 June

Placing	Pair / Rider Name	Total	1	2	3	4	5	6	7	8	9	10	11	12	13	14	15	16	17	18	19	20	21
1	England	24							9							16							24
1	(5) Malcolm Simmons	15+3		3			3			0					3				3			3
1	(6) Gordon Kennett	9		2			1			3					1				1			1
2	New Zealand	24							10							16							24
2	(1) Ivan Mauger	12+2	3			2				2			1				3			1
2	(2) Larry Ross	12	2			3				1			2				2			2
3	Denmark	21							8							13							21
3	(11) Ole Olsen	16			2				3				3		2			3					3
3	(12) Finn Thomsen	5			1				2				0		E			1					1
4	Czechoslovakia	18							3							11							18
4	(3) Jiří Štancl	9	1				0				1			2				2			3
4	(4) Jan Verner	9	0				2				2			3				0			2
5	Poland	15							4							10							15
5	(7) Edward Jancarz	13		1				2			3					2				3			2
5	(8) Bolesław Proch	2		0				1			0					1				0			0
6	West Germany	13							2							10							13
6	(13) Georg Hack	8				1			1			3				3			0		0
6	(14) Hans Wassermann	5				0			0			2				0			2		1
7	Sweden	11							6							8							11
7	(9) Börje Klingberg	1			0			0				0		1			0					0
7	(10) Jan Andersson	10			3			3				1		E			1					2
Placing	Pair / Rider Name	Total	1	2	3	4	5	6	7	8	9	10	11	12	13	14	15	16	17	18	19	20	21

m - exclusion for exceeding two minute time allowance • t - exclusion for touching the tapes • x - other exclusion • e - retired or mechanical failure • f - fell
ns - non-starter • nc - non-classify

gate A - inside	gate B	gate C	gate D - outside

== See also ==
- 1978 Individual Speedway World Championship
- 1978 Speedway World Team Cup
- motorcycle speedway
- 1978 in sports
