= 1981 Individual Long Track World Championship =

Long track motorcycle racing event

The 1981 Individual Long Track World Championship was the 11th edition of the FIM speedway Individual Long Track World Championship. The event was held on 20 September 1981 in Gornja Radgona in the Slovenia, which was Yugoslavia at the time.

The world title was won by Michael Lee of England. Ivan Mauger crashed in heat 7 and was taken to hospital.

== Final Classification ==
Pos	Rider	Heat Pts	Heat Pts	Heat Pts	Heat Pts	Heat Pts	Total Pts
1	(England) Michael Lee	3	5	5	5	5	23
2	(West Germany) Christoph Betzl	5	4	5	5	1	20
3	(Sweden) Anders Michanek	4	4	4	4	3	19
4	(West Germany) Georg Gilgenreiner	1	5	5	4	4	19
5	(West Germany) Egon Müller	5	3	3	3	2	16
6	(England) Phil Collins	4	5	2	3	0	14
7	(West Germany) Josef Aigner	3	4	4	2	E	13
8	(West Germany) Hans Otto Pingel	5	3	4	ef	E	12
9	(England) Peter Collins	3	2	3	2	E	10
10	(Czechoslovakia) Jiří Štancl	1	3	1	1	E	6
11	(New Zealand) Ivan Mauger	4	2	ns	ns	E	6
12	(West Germany) Georg Hack	2	0	3	ef	E	5
13	(West Germany) Karl Maier	2	1	2	E	E	5
14	(Czechoslovakia) Zdeněk Kudrna	2	2	ns	E	E	4
15	(Socialist Federal Republic of Yugoslavia) Stefan Kekec	0	1	2	E	E	3
16	(Socialist Federal Republic of Yugoslavia) Vlado Kocuvan	0	0	1	E	E	1
17	(West Germany) Alois Wiesböck	ef	1	ef	E	E	1
18	(West Germany) Wilhelm Duden	ef	0	E	E	ef	0

- E = eliminated (no further ride)
- f = fell
- ef = engine failure
- ns = non starter
