= 1979 Individual Long Track World Championship =

Long track motorcycle racing event

- Venue: Mariánské Lázně
- Location: Czechoslovakia
- Start date: September 9, 1979
- Competitors: 18 from 7 nations
- Winning score: 21

Medalists
gold medal	Alois Wiesböck	West Germany
silver medal	Anders Michanek	Sweden
bronze medal	Ole Olsen	Denmark

The 1979 Individual Long Track World Championship was the ninth edition of the FIM speedway Individual Long Track World Championship. The event was held on 9 September 1979 in Mariánské Lázně in the Czech Republic, which was Czechoslovakia at the time.

The world title was won by Alois Wiesböck of West Germany.

== Final Classification ==
Pos	Rider	Heat Pts	Heat Pts	Heat Pts	Heat Pts	Heat Pts	Total Pts
1	(West Germany) Alois Wiesböck	5	4	5	5	2	21
2	(Sweden) Anders Michanek	4	5	5	5	1	20
3	(Denmark) Ole Olsen	2	5	4	3	5	19
4	(Czechoslovakia) Jiří Štancl	4	3	3	3	4	17
5	(West Germany) Georg Hack	2	4	3	4	3	16
6	(West Germany) Karl Maier	4	5	2	2	0	13
7	(West Germany) Egon Müller	5	4	3	0	E	12
8	(Denmark) Kristian Præstbro	3	0	4	4	E	11
9	(England) Michael Lee	0	3	4	2	E	9
10	(New Zealand) Ivan Mauger	1	1	5	1	E	8
11	(Czechoslovakia) Aleš Dryml Sr.	5	2	ef	1	E	7
12	(England) Peter Collins	3	2	2	0	E	7
13	(West Germany) Christoph Betzl	3	2	1	E	E	6
14	(West Germany) Wilhelm Duden	1	3	2	E	E	6
15	(Denmark) Alf Busk	2	0	1	E	E	3
16	(Czechoslovakia) Zdeněk Kudrna	1	1	0	E	E	2
17	(Italy) Francesco Biginato	0	0	1	E	E	1
18	(West Germany) Walter Grubmuller	0	1	0	E	E	1

- E = eliminated (no further ride)
- ef = engine failure
