= Georg Gilgenreiner =

German speedway rider

- Born: 28 August 1948 (age 78); Lenggries, Germany
- Nationality: German

Career history

West Germany
- 1980: Krumbach

Individual honours
- 1980: West German Champion
- 1981, 1982: World Long Track finalist

Team honours
- 1981: World Pairs finalist

Georg Gilgenreiner (born 28 August 1948) is a former international speedway rider from Germany.

== Speedway career ==
Gilgenreiner was champion of West Germany in 1980 at the German Individual Speedway Championship.

Gilgenreiner reached the final of the Speedway World Pairs Championship in the 1981 Speedway World Pairs Championship. He has also reached the final of the Individual Speedway Long Track World Championship on two occasions in 1981 and 1982.

Gilgenreiner rode in the final of the 1981 and 1982 World Team Cup.

== World Final appearances ==
=== World Pairs Championship ===
- 1981 - (Poland) Chorzów, Silesian Stadium (with Egon Müller) - 7th - 3pts

=== World Team Cup ===
- 1981 - (West Germany) Olching, Speedway Stadion Olching (with Egon Müller / Karl Maier / Georg Hack) - 3rd - 28pts (5)
- 1982 - (England) London, White City Stadium (with Karl Maier / Georg Hack / Egon Müller / Alois Wiesböck) - 3rd - 18pts (1)

=== World Longtrack Championship ===
- 1981 – (Socialist Federal Republic of Yugoslavia) Gornja Radgona 4th 19pts
- 1982 – (Denmark) Esbjerg 4th 15pts
