= Alois Wiesböck =

German speedway rider

- Born: 31 July 1950 (age 76); Niederbergkirchen, West Germany
- Nationality: German

Career history

West Germany
- 1974–1979: Bopfingen
- 1982, 1987: Pocking

Great Britain
- 1979: Reading Racers

Individual honours
- 1979: Long Track World Champion
- 1974, 1976, 1978, 1981: West German Longtrack champion

Alois Wiesböck (born 31 July 1950), in Niederbergkirchen, is a former Long track motorcycle racing world champion and international motorcycle speedway rider from Germany. He earned 24 international caps for the West German national speedway team.

== Career ==
Wiesböck was winner of the Individual Speedway Long Track World Championship in 1979.

Wiesböck was also a four-time West German Longtrack champion in 1974, 1976, 1978 and 1981.

Wiesböck rode in Great Britain during the 1979 British League season as a rider for the Reading Racers but only rode in two matches.

Wiesböck rode in the final of the 1981 and 1982 World Team Cup.

== World Final appearances ==
=== Individual World Championship ===
- 1979 - (Poland) Chorzów, Silesian Stadium - 16th - 1pt

=== World Team Cup ===
- 1982 - (England) London, White City Stadium (with Georg Hack / Karl Maier / Egon Müller / Georg Gilgenreiner) - 3rd - 18pts (0)

== World Longtrack Championship ==
- 1974 - (West Germany) Scheeßel (3rd) 21pts
- 1975 - (Czechoslovakia) Mariánské Lázně (4th) 21pts
- 1977 - (Denmark) Aalborg (6th) 18pts
- 1978 - (West Germany) Mühldorf (2nd) 26pts
- 1979 - (Czechoslovakia) Mariánské Lázně (Champion) 19pts
- 1980 - (West Germany) Scheeßel (Disq+)
- 1981 - (Socialist Federal Republic of Yugoslavia) Gornja Radgona (17th) 1pt
- 1982 - (Denmark) Esbjerg (2nd) 22pts
- 1983 - (Czechoslovakia) Mariánské Lázně (4th) 16pts
- 1986 - (West Germany) Pfarrkirchen (17th) 0pts
- 1987 - (West Germany) Mühldorf (11th) 6 pts

+ disqualified after finishing third for having an oversize engine
