= Hans Wassermann =

German speedway rider

- Born: 1 September 1953 (age 73); Kraftisried, West Germany
- Nationality: German

Career history

Germany
- 1971: Krumbach

Great Britain
- 1977-1978: Reading Racers

Individual honours
- 1975, 1976, 1977: World Long Track finalist

Team honours
- 1977: World Pairs bronze medal
- 1977: Spring Gold Cup Winner

Hans Wassermann (born 1 September 1953) is a former international speedway rider from West Germany. He earned 15 international caps for the West German national speedway team.

== Speedway career ==
Wassermann won a bronze medal at the Speedway World Pairs Championship in the 1977 Speedway World Pairs Championship. He has also reached the final of the Individual Speedway Long Track World Championship on three occasions in 1975, 1976 and 1977.

Wassermann rode in the top tier of British Speedway from 1977 to 1978, riding for Reading Racers.

== World Final appearances ==
=== World Pairs Championship ===
- 1977 - (England) Manchester, Hyde Road (with Egon Müller) - 3rd - 18pts
- 1978 - (Poland) Chorzów, Silesian Stadium (with Georg Hack) - 6th - 13pts
