= Christoph Betzl =

German speedway rider

- Born: 13 February 1949 (age 77); Rott am Inn, Germany
- Nationality: German

Career history

West Germany
- 1980: Landshut

Great Britain
- 1975: Poole Pirates

Individual honours
- 1979: Speedway World Championship finalist
- 1979: Continental Final Champion
- 1974, 1975, 1976, 1977, 1979, 1980, 1981, 1982: World Long Track finalist

Christoph Betzl (born 13 February 1949) is a German former international speedway rider. He earned 24 international caps for the West German national speedway team.

== Speedway career ==
Betzl reached the final of the Speedway World Championship in the 1979 Individual Speedway World Championship representing West Germany. He has also reached the final of the Individual Speedway Long Track World Championship on eight occasions in 1974, 1975, 1976, 1977, 1979, 1980, 1981 and 1982. He won a bronze medal in the 1980 final and a silver medal in the 1981 final.

Betzl was part of the German team that competed in an eight match tour of Britain in 1975. This was the same season that he rode in British Speedway leagues, riding for Poole Pirates.

== World final appearances ==
=== Individual World Championship ===
- 1979 – (Poland) Chorzów, Silesian Stadium – 14th – 2pts

=== World Pairs Championship ===
- 1975 - (Poland) Wrocław, Olympic Stadium (with Fritz Baur) - 6th - 10pts (6)

=== World Longtrack Championship ===
- 1974 – (West Germany) Scheeßel 12th 8pts
- 1975 – (Socialist Federal Republic of Yugoslavia) Gornja Radgona 5th 17pts
- 1976 – (Czechoslovakia) Mariánské Lázně 8th 10pts
- 1977 – (Denmark) Aalborg 11th 9pts
- 1979 – (Czechoslovakia) Mariánské Lázně 13th 6pts
- 1980 – (West Germany) Scheeßel 3rd 16pts
- 1981 – (Socialist Federal Republic of Yugoslavia) Gornja Radgona 2nd 20pts
- 1982 – (Denmark) Esbjerg 10th 7pts

=== Individual Ice Speedway World Championship ===
- 1971 - (West Germany) Inzell 14th 4pts
- 1973 – (West Germany) Inzell 15th 3pts
