= Steve Gresham =

American speedway rider

- Born: 18 August 1954 (age 72); Santa Monica, United States
- Nationality: American

Career history
- 1974: Hull Vikings
- 1975–1976: Newport
- 1977–1978: Bristol Bulldogs
- 1979–1981, 1983: Swindon Robins
- 1982: Reading Racers

Team honours
- 1975: Spring Gold Cup

Steven Richard Gresham (born 18 August 1954) is a former motorcycle speedway rider from the United States. He earned 20 caps for the United States national speedway team.

== Career ==
Gresham made his British League debut in 1974, when he joined the Hull Vikings for the 1974 British League season. The following season, he switched to Newport Wasps and stayed with the Welsh club for two years, improving his average to 7.41. In 1977, he joined the Bristol Bulldogs for the 1977 and 1978 seasons.

During 1978, Gresham surpassed a nine-point average for Bristol and represented the United States national speedway team in the 1978 Speedway World Team Cup. The following season, he was again part of the USA team that competed at the 1979 Speedway World Team Cup and was due to represent the United States in the 1979 Speedway World Pairs Championship, but was stranded at Heathrow Airport and failed to make the event.

In Britain, Gresham rode for Swindon Robins from 1979 to 1981 and again in 1983, and for Reading Racers in 1982.
