= Scott Autrey =

American motorcycle racer (born 1953)

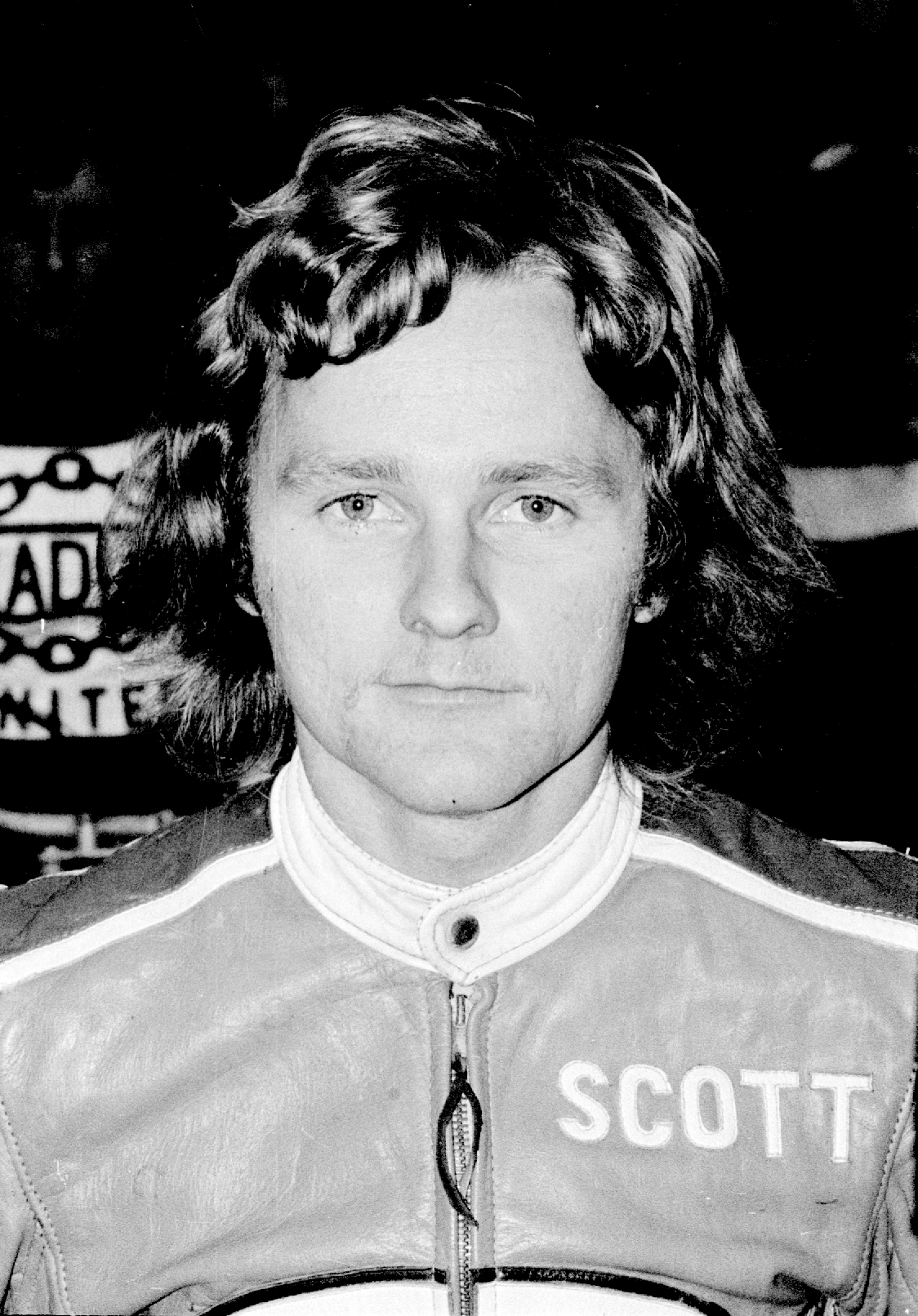
- Born: Scott Brian Autrey; 9 July 1953 (age 73); Maywood, California, U.S.
- Nationality: American

Career history
- 1973-1979: Exeter Falcons
- 1980: Swindon Robins
- 1981-1982: Poole Pirates

Individual honours
- 1978: Daily Mirror Golden Hammer
- 1978, 1979, 1980: Strongbow Golden Gauntlets
- 1978, 1979: Daily Express Spring Classic
- 1979: Daily Mirror/Berger Grand Prix
- 1980: Midland Riders Champion

Team honours
- 1974: British League Winner
- 1978: Spring Gold Cup Winner
- 1982: World Team Cup winner

Scott Brian Autrey (born July 9, 1953) is an American former professional motorcycle speedway rider. In 1976, he became the first American rider to reach a speedway world final since Ernie Roccio in 1951. He earned 22 caps for the United States national speedway team.

== Motorcycle racing career ==
Born in Maywood, California, Autrey began his motorcycle racing career in 1964 by competing in flat track racing at Perris Auto Speedway. In 1968, he had a major off-road racing victory when he won the 100cc class in the Rosarita Grand Prix in Mexico. He also competed in road racing, placing second in the novice road race class held before the 1971 Daytona 200.

In 1972, Autrey finished second in the United States Speedway National Championship. After witnessing the 1972 Individual Speedway World Championship in Wembley Stadium, he made the decision to concentrate fully on speedway racing. In 1973, Autrey was recommended by Ivan Mauger to join the Exeter Falcons in England, where he stayed for seven years.

In 1980, Autrey joined Swindon Robins, before moving on to Poole Pirates from 1981 to 1982.

Autrey finished third in the 1978 World Speedway Championship at Wembley and won the World Team Cup with the USA in 1982. He retired from the sport at the end of 1982 at a relatively young age.

== Automobile racing career ==
After his two-wheeled racing career ended, Autrey became a NASCAR driver who made one Winston Cup start. He also competed in the Winston West Series part-time. His lone Cup race came in 1985, when Autrey started 29th in the forty-one car field, where he dropped out late with transmission issues. He finished 34th as a result. In eleven West Series starts, he scored four top-ten finishes.

== World Final appearances ==
=== Individual World Championship ===
- 1976 - (Poland) Chorzów, Silesian Stadium - 9th - 7pts
- 1978 - (England) London, Wembley Stadium - 3rd - 11pts + 3pts

=== World Team Cup ===
- 1980 - (Poland) Wrocław, Olympic Stadium (with Bruce Penhall / Dennis Sigalos / Bobby Schwartz / Ron Preston) - 2nd - 29pts (9)
- 1982 - (England) London, White City Stadium (with Bruce Penhall / Bobby Schwartz / Kelly Moran / Shawn Moran) - Winner - 34pts (0)

=== World Longtrack Final ===
- 1978 (Germany) Mühldorf (11th) 9pts
