= Olching =

- Municipality
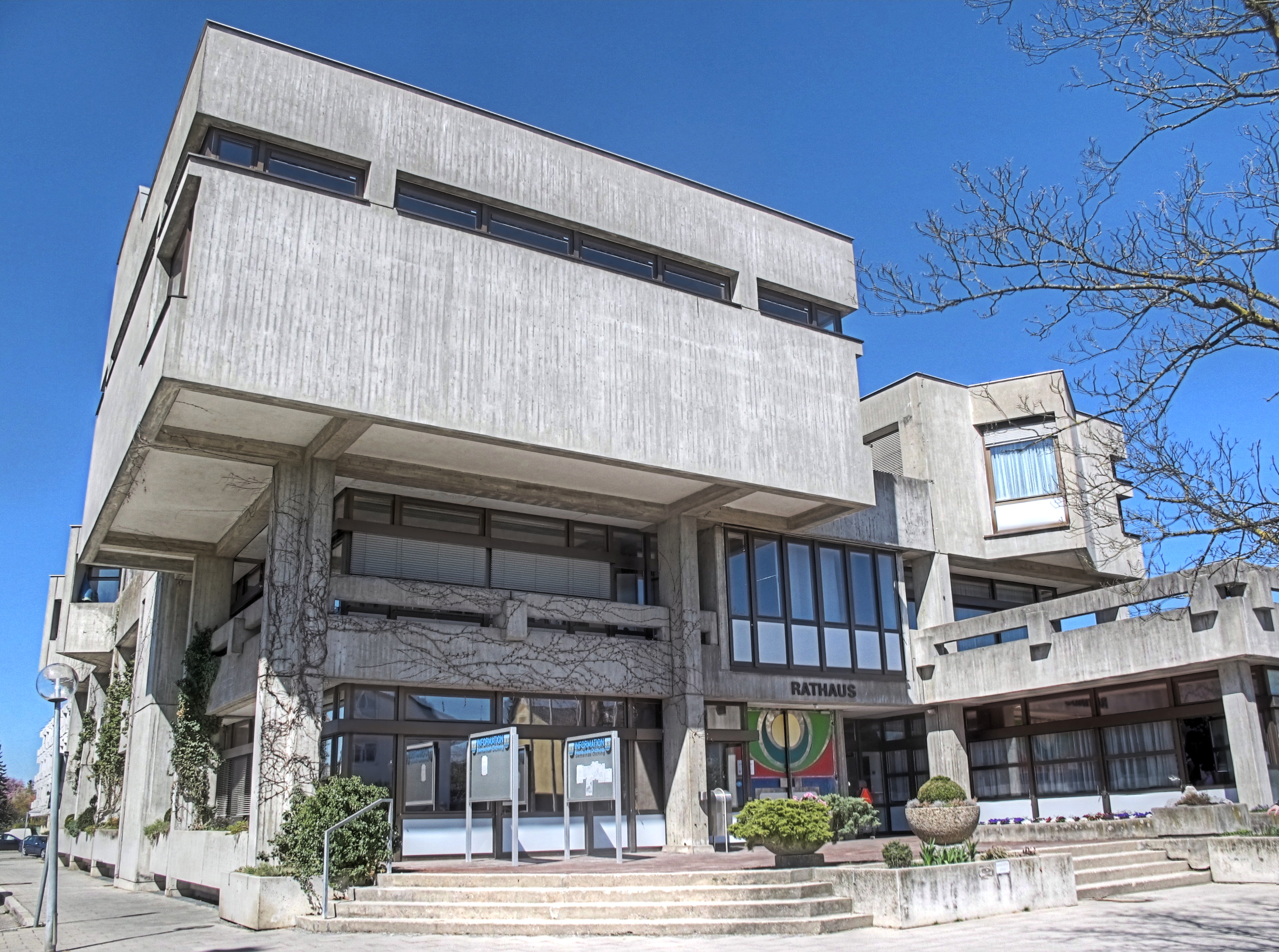
- Town hall

- Coat of arms

- Location of Olching within Fürstenfeldbruck district
- Interactive map of Olching
- Location within Germany Location within Bavaria
- Coordinates: 48°12′N 11°19′E
- Country: Germany
- State: Bavaria
- Admin. region: Oberbayern
- District: Fürstenfeldbruck

Government
  - Mayor (2026–32): Maximilian Gigl (CSU)

Area
  - Total: 29.92 km^{2} (11.55 sq mi)
- Elevation: 503 m (1,650 ft)

Population (2025-12-31)
  - Total: 27,418
  - Density: 916.4/km^{2} (2,373/sq mi)
- Time zone: UTC+01:00 (CET)
  - Summer (DST): UTC+02:00 (CEST)
- Postal codes: 82140
- Dialling codes: 08142
- Vehicle registration: FFB
- Website: www.olching.de

Olching (German pronunciation: [ˈɔlçɪŋ]; Central Bavarian: Oiching) is a town in the district of Fürstenfeldbruck, and suburb to Munich in Bavaria, Germany. It is situated approximately 20 km (12 mi) northwest of Munich.

== Geography ==
Olching lies approximately halfway between Dachau and Fürstenfeldbruck, and stretches along both sides of the River Amper. There are two picturesque man-made lakes to the east of Olching, namely the Olchinger See (Lake Olching) and the eponymous Kleiner See (Small Lake), both of which border on the neighbouring municipality of Gröbenzell.

In recent years, Olching has expanded considerably through new building work to meet the demand for housing outside Munich while taking advantage of its good communications, which allow a reasonable commute for those still working in the city and its outskirts. These new developments, especially Schwaigfeld, located north-east of the town centre — close to Olching's motorway exit — have attracted controversy amongst some locals for their apparently inconsistent planning and sometimes eclectic architecture.

The ongoing influx of younger families into these new developments would appear to show that they have become a significant part of the modern Olching community, and the developments continue to grow and generate their own infrastructure improvements. A small shopping centre was opened in Schwaigfeld in January 2008.

== Neighbouring communities ==
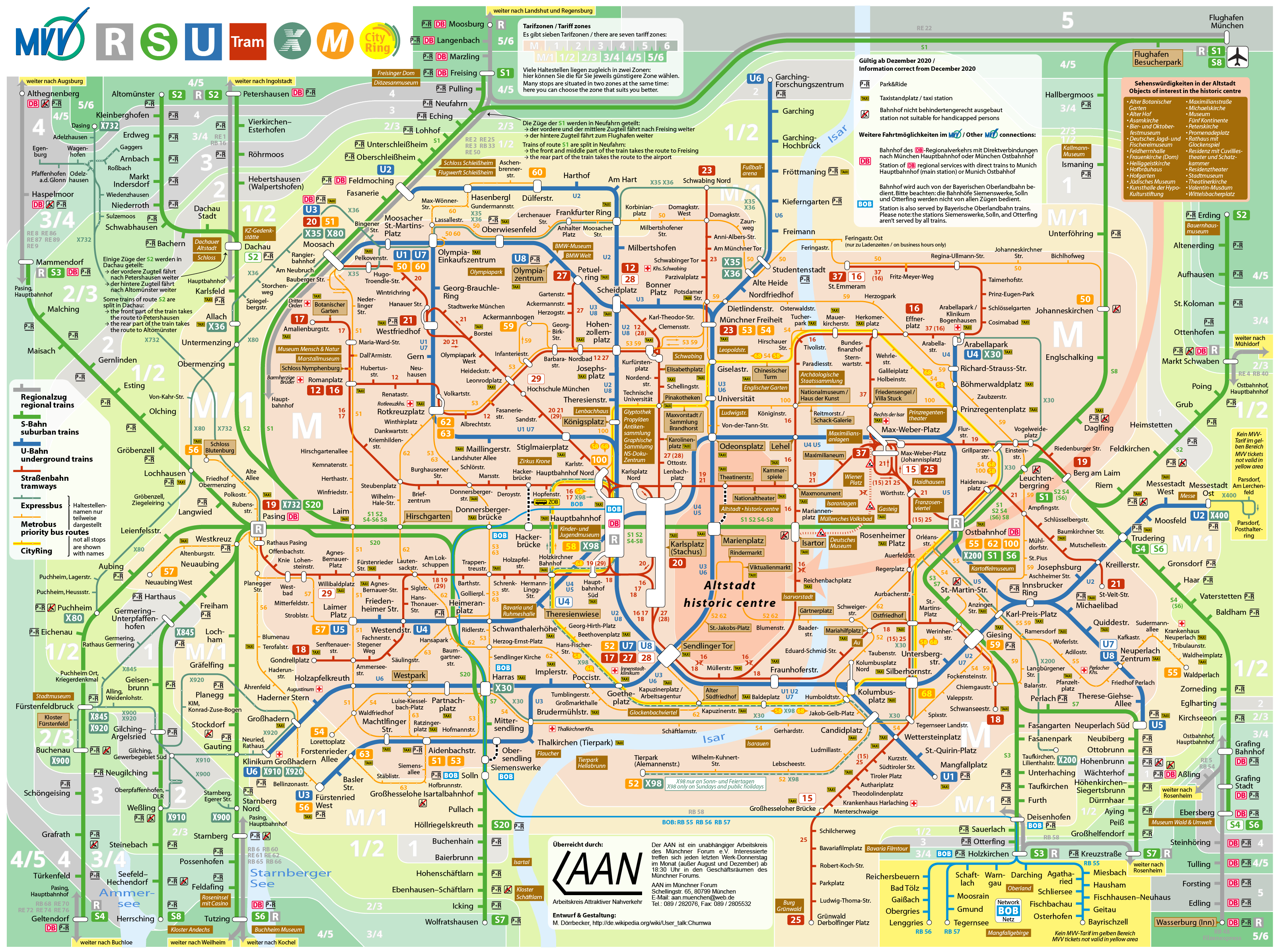
Public transport network around Munich including the suburban train line that connects to Olching

Olching is bordered to the west by Maisach, in the north by Bergkirchen, in the East by Gröbenzell and the outskirts of metropolitan Munich, to the south by Puchheim, Eichenau and in the south-west by Emmering and Fürstenfeldbruck. The municipality of Olching is now (since 1978) made up of four main municipalities, namely Olching, Esting (including Neu-Esting), Geiselbullach and Graßlfing.

== Communications ==
Olching is located near the Autobahn A8 exits Dachau/Fürstenfeldbruck and Lochhausen/Langwied, as well as the Autobahn A99. The Munich trunk ring road B471 also has 2 exits for Olching.

The River Amper is neither navigable to leisure craft nor to goods traffic. Smaller watercraft such as dinghies and kayaks are however frequently underway in the summer months.

=== Public transport ===
Olching is connected to the Munich S-Bahn network on the line. It takes about 20 minutes to München Hauptbahnhof (Munich Central Station). The line is part of the MVV, or Münchener Verkehrsverbund, which is a unified tariff zone that includes local buses, trams, and underground trains (U-Bahnen) in the Munich area.

Olching station is located on - but not served by - the DB Munich–Augsburg mainline which also carries significant goods traffic. For express train travel, residents of Olching may travel via Munich Pasing and Munich Hauptbahnhof

== Climate ==
Olching lies in the transitional zone between the humid Atlantic climate and the dry continental climates. Other significant factors affecting the weather are the Alps, which act as south-central European border, and the Danube, which is a regional meteorological divide. Due to this constellation, the weather in the region is quite changeable.

=== Foehn ===
The so-called foehn is a weather phenomenon particular to the region near to the Alps that occasionally brings warmer and drier air from the south to Olching, potentially occurring at any time of year. This is accompanied by extremely good visibility, in particular the much-clichéd Bavarian blue and white sky, and the Bavarian Alps may be clearly visible, apparently close by, although they are approximately 100 kilometres (60 mi) away to the south. Some people suffer from headaches and circulatory problems as a result of the foehn.

== History ==
=== Early records ===
Olching is an old bavarii settlement and was first mentioned in the Early Middle Ages. In 740 the Agilolfingian duke Tassilo II of Bavaria bestowed the town, together with its church and flour mill, to the Benediktbeuern Abbey (the authenticity of this document is contested). The early Gothic church was replaced by the Romanesque basilica St. Peter und Paul in 1903.

In 1258 Louis II, Duke of Bavaria founded a monastery as a form of penance for the execution of his wife Maria von Brabant, who had wrongfully been convicted of adultery. This monastery was relocated from Aibling to Olching in 1262. The monastery was relocated to Fürstenfeldbruck only one year later, either due to flooding or structural problems. The Fürstenfeld Abbey owned several estates in Olching until the period of secularization in Bavaria in 1802/1803.

Olching suffered severely as a consequence of the Thirty Years' War, particularly after the city of Munich was taken by Gustavus Adolphus of Sweden in 1632. Only nine out of formerly 67 estates remained in Olching after 1648.

=== Developments in the 19th century ===
In 1821 Olching (which had until then been administered by Dachau) was transferred to the newly founded Rentamt of Fürstenfeldbruck, and in 1823 it also came under the jurisdiction of Fürstenfeldbruck.

In 1834 the first school was established in Olching.

Until 1839 Olching was still very rural with about 50 farms and approximately 300 inhabitants. This changed with the construction of the railway line between Munich to Augsburg. The line between Munich and Olching was completed on 27 October 1839 and the rail service commenced the following year. At the same time a wood pulp factory opened in Olching, which in turn led to a strong influx of workers.

=== The 20th century ===
The predominantly working class population had a large influence on the social and political culture of Olching during the 20th century. During the Weimar Republic the municipal council was solely dominated by left-wing parties. However, for some of these left-wing politicians, such as SPD-mayor Josef Tauscheck, their political beliefs had serious repercussions due to the rise of the right in Germany in the 1920s and 1930s. Some experienced a great degree of harassment, for others it led to internment in the infamous concentration camps after 1933. Just as in the rest of Germany the National Socialists also gained a large following in Olching in the run-up to and during the Third Reich.

During an allied air raid on 22 February 1944, 22 people were killed, including two of the approximately 1000 forced laborers located in and around Olching during the war.

After World War II about 5,000 Heimatvertriebene (expellees), mainly from Silesia and Czechoslovakia, arrived in Olching. In 1950 these new citizens made up 25% of the population of Olching and they contributed towards the dynamic development of Olching in the post-war era.

The erstwhile rural appearance of Olching has changed over time, as the cityscape of Olching is becoming more and more dominated by businesses and blocks of flats. Many of Olching's citizens use the S-Bahn to commute to work in Munich, which was built for the 1972 Summer Olympics. In 1978 Esting, Geiselbullach, and Graßlfing were merged into the larger community of Olching and this has contributed towards a continuous population growth, especially since the development of the Schwaigfeld area in the early 2000s.

Olching was named a city on 19 June 2011.

=== Coat of Arms ===
Olching's coat of arms originates from the year 1951. The swept blue bar in the lower part symbolises the river Amper, which flows through Olching and is of major significance for the town. The reed in the middle reminds that Olching was once marshland; the head of wheat symbolises the agriculture and land cultivation. The upper part displays the chequered blue and white Bavarian standard.

== Population ==
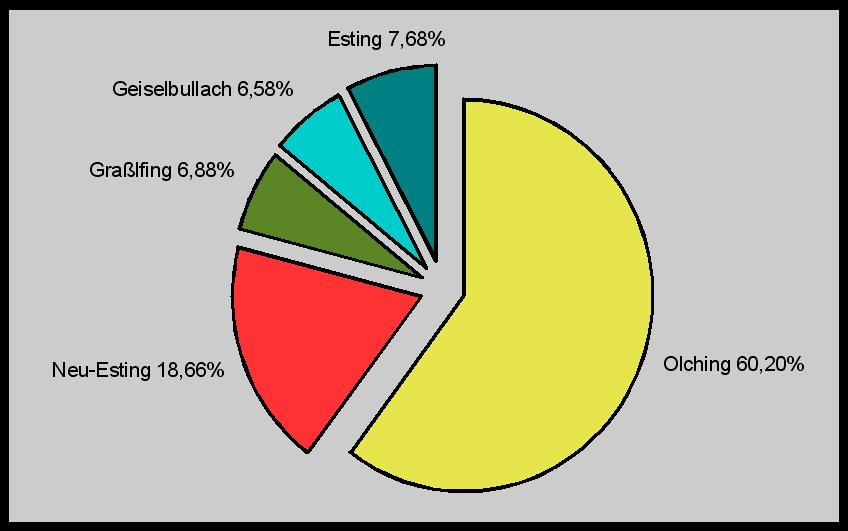
Olching's population of 21,934 in December 1997 with a breakdown of the five individual communities

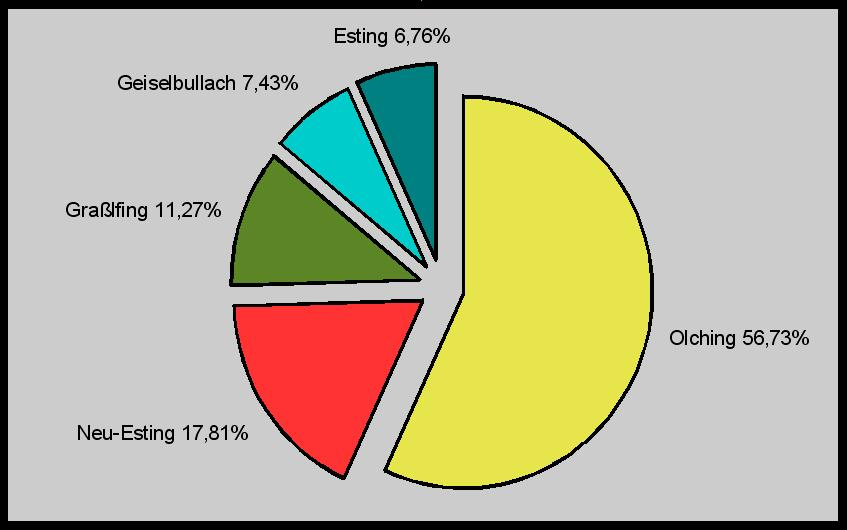
Olching's population of 24,474 in December 2007, which shows the population growth in Geiselbullach and Graßlfing due to the development of the Schwaigfeld area

The current figure (August 2009) for the population of Olching is 24,582. In the past ten years, the population has grown by 10% and is expected by local officials to rise to 25,750 by 2010. This development is mainly driven by the importance of Munich as a centre of employment and by a wish to avoid the higher urban property prices which have been driven by Munich's continuing economic success.

=== Demographics ===
At present approximately 9% of the current population are of non-German origin.

=== Politics ===
The Olching Gemeinderat, or local council, has 30 seats. Since the latest local elections on 2 March 2008 it is made up as follows:

- CSU—12 seats (+2)
- SPD—7 seats (+4)
- FWO—6 seats (-2)
- Grüne—3 seats (+1)
- FW-GEO—1 seat (-3)
- ÖDP—1 seat (-1)

The numbers in brackets indicate the gains and losses since the previous election in March 2002.

=== Religion and worship ===
Amongst the adult population, the declared religious affiliation (which has fiscal consequences in Germany) breaks down as follows:

- 12,772 are Roman Catholic,
- 3,975 are Protestant,
- 7,456 are of other religious (Hindu, Muslim etc.) denominations or of no religion.

==== Churches ====
In the centre of Olching, the skyline and Haupstrasse are dominated by the catholic church, there is a smaller protestant/Lutheran church near to the station and a modern catholic church in New Esting:

- St. Peter und Paul (Olching)
- St. Elisabeth v. Thüringen (Olching New Esting)
- Evangelisch-Lutherische Johanneskirche (Olching)
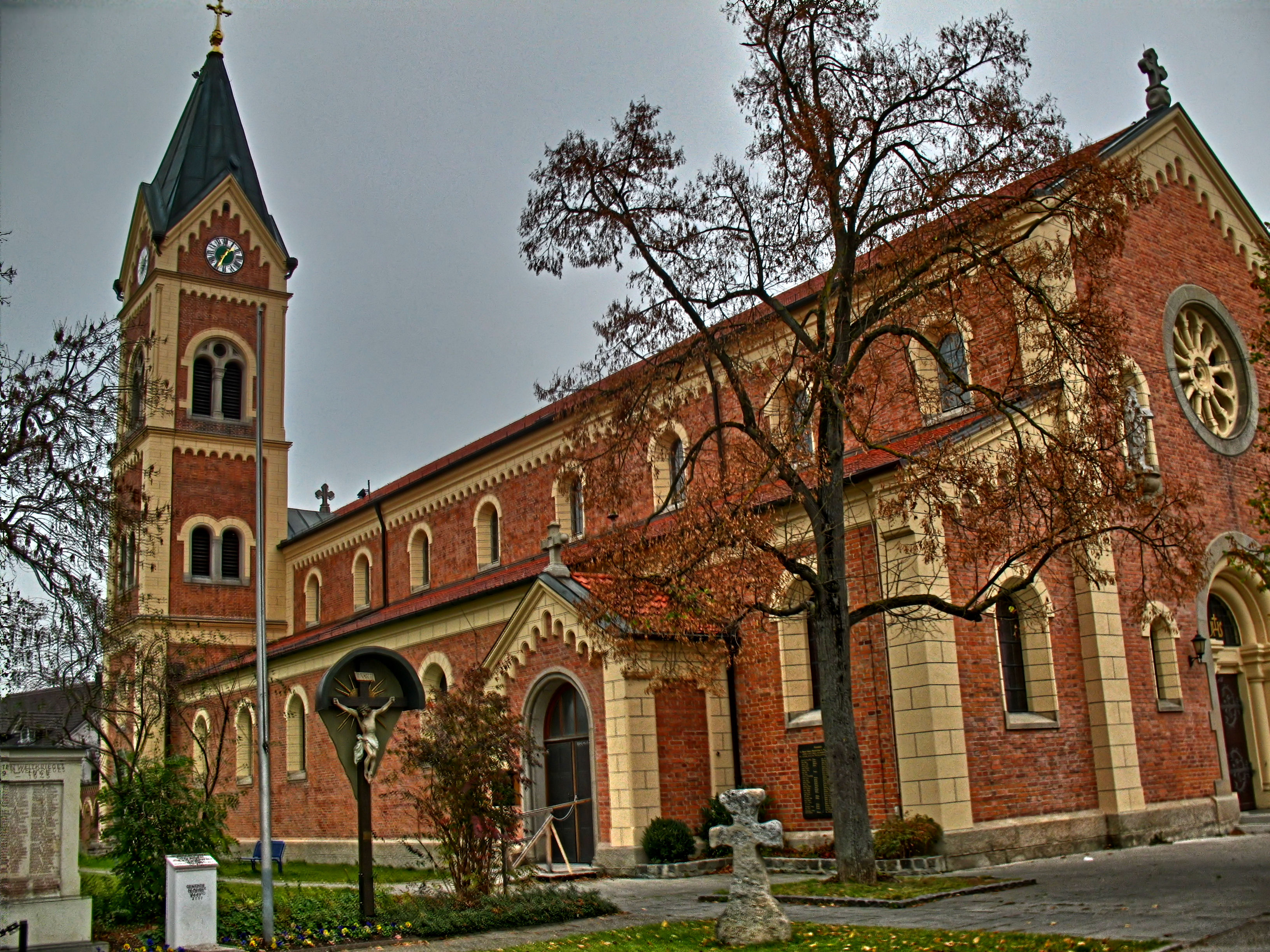
St. Peter und Paul

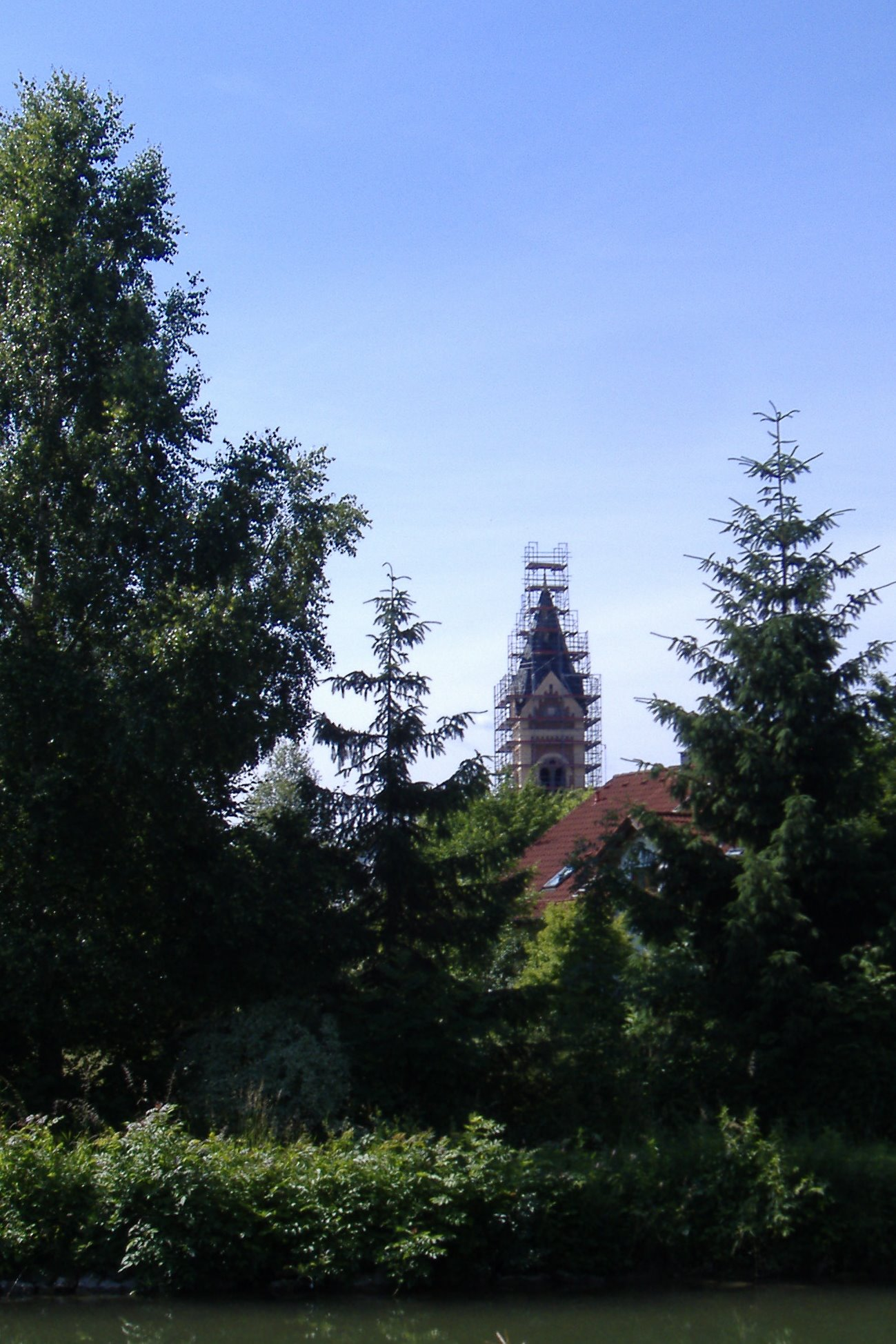
St Peter & Paul pictured in 2008 during renovation work

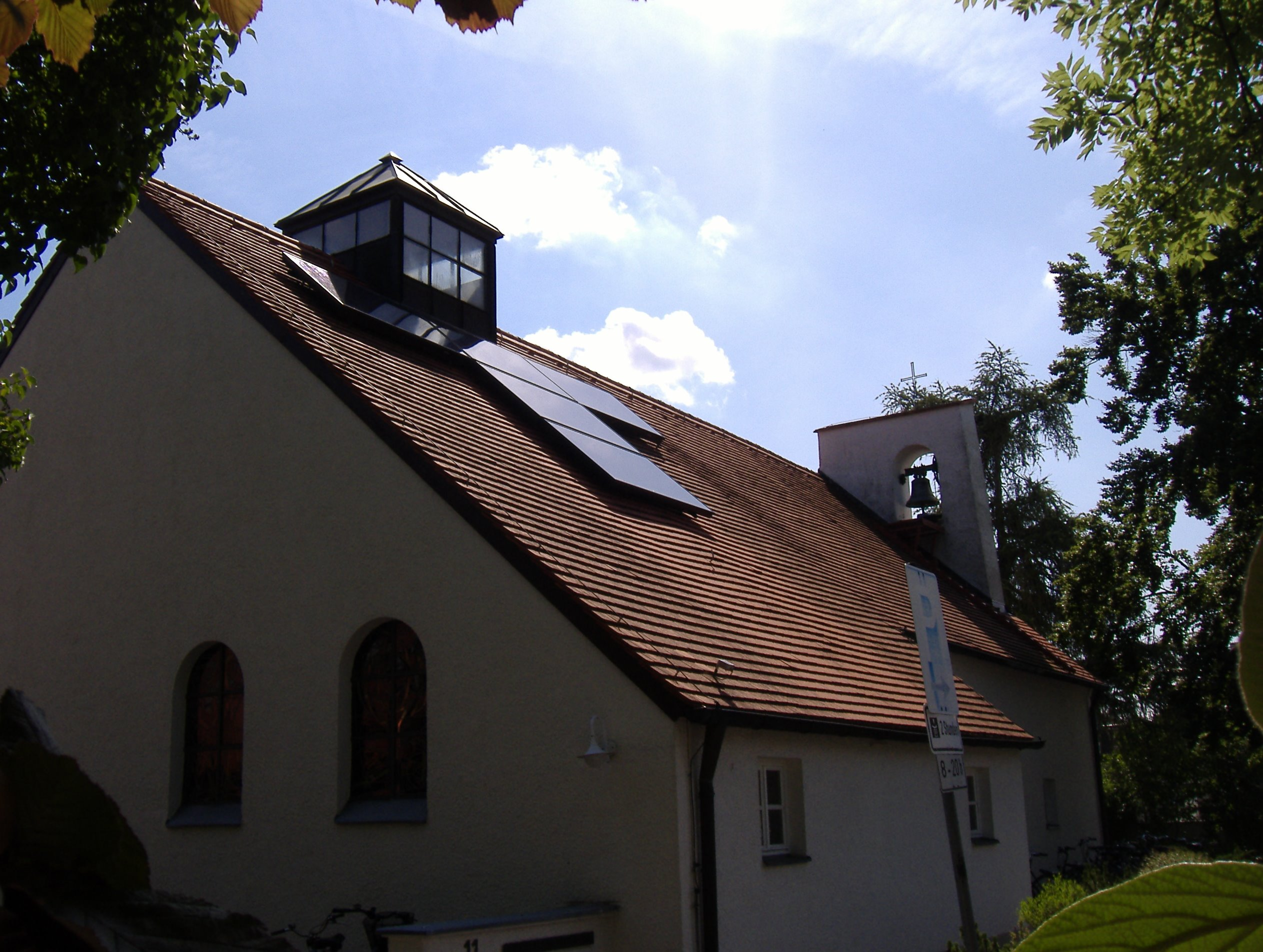
Johanneskirche in Olching's Wolfstrasse

==== Other religious groups and organisations ====
As well as groups such as kindergartens, attached to and or supported by the church community, other groups of various denominations are present and active in Olching:

- Brot des Lebens e.V. (Olching)
- Christliche Gemeinde Olching e. V. (Olching)
- CVJM Ortsgruppe Olching (Olching)
- Ev. Pfarramt I (Olching)
- Kath. Kindergarten St. Elisabeth (Olching)
- Kath. Pfarramt Esting (Olching)
- Kindergarten (Olching Wolfstrasse)
- Kloster der Franziskanerinnen (Olching)
- Kolpingfamilie (Olching)
- Missionskreis Maria Mater Dei e. V. (Olching)
- Pfarrgemeinderat St. Peter und Paul (Olching)
- Türkisch-Islamischer Verein Fürstenfeldbruck und Umgebung (Olching)
- Vincentiusverein (Olching)

== Education ==
=== Primary and secondary education ===
The main schools in Olching are

- Grundschule Olching (primary school),
- Grundschule Graßlfing (primary school),
- Grund- und Hauptschule Esting (primary school and secondary school),
- Montessori Grund- und Hauptschule (primary school and secondary school),
- Gymnasium Olching (secondary school), and the
- Hauptschule an der Heckenstraße (secondary school).

=== Others ===
Other educational establishments in Olching include

- Volkshochschule Olching, (mainly) adult education and evening classes in all fields
- 3klang GmbH - Musikschule aus Olching
- Ev. Bildungswerk im Landkreis (Pfarramt Olching), Evangelical Church education centre
- Musikschule Olching und Esting, Music School

== Economy ==
Olching has two larger business parks: One larger in the north called Gewerbepark Geiselbullach and another in the south along the Johann-G.-Gutenberg Straße. In Geiselbullach there are many logistics companies including a warehouse from Amazon Logistics.

In Olching are multiple solar power plants and a waste incineration plant which provides electric power and district heating to Olching an surrounding municipalities.

== Leisure ==
=== Sports clubs ===
Olching is well known for its motorcycle speedway club and track, MSC Olching and the Olching Speedwaybahn. It hosts a number of events, including international motorcycling events, including the finals of the 1972 Speedway World Team Cup and the 1981 Speedway World Team Cup. Olching is also known for its attractive golf course which lies between Olching and Geiselbullach. There are also championship—and leisure—minigolf courses located at separate, neighbouring clubs.

There are also a number of sports clubs, including SC Olching, SV Esting, and the TSV Geiselbullach.

=== Natural recreation areas and leisure facilities ===
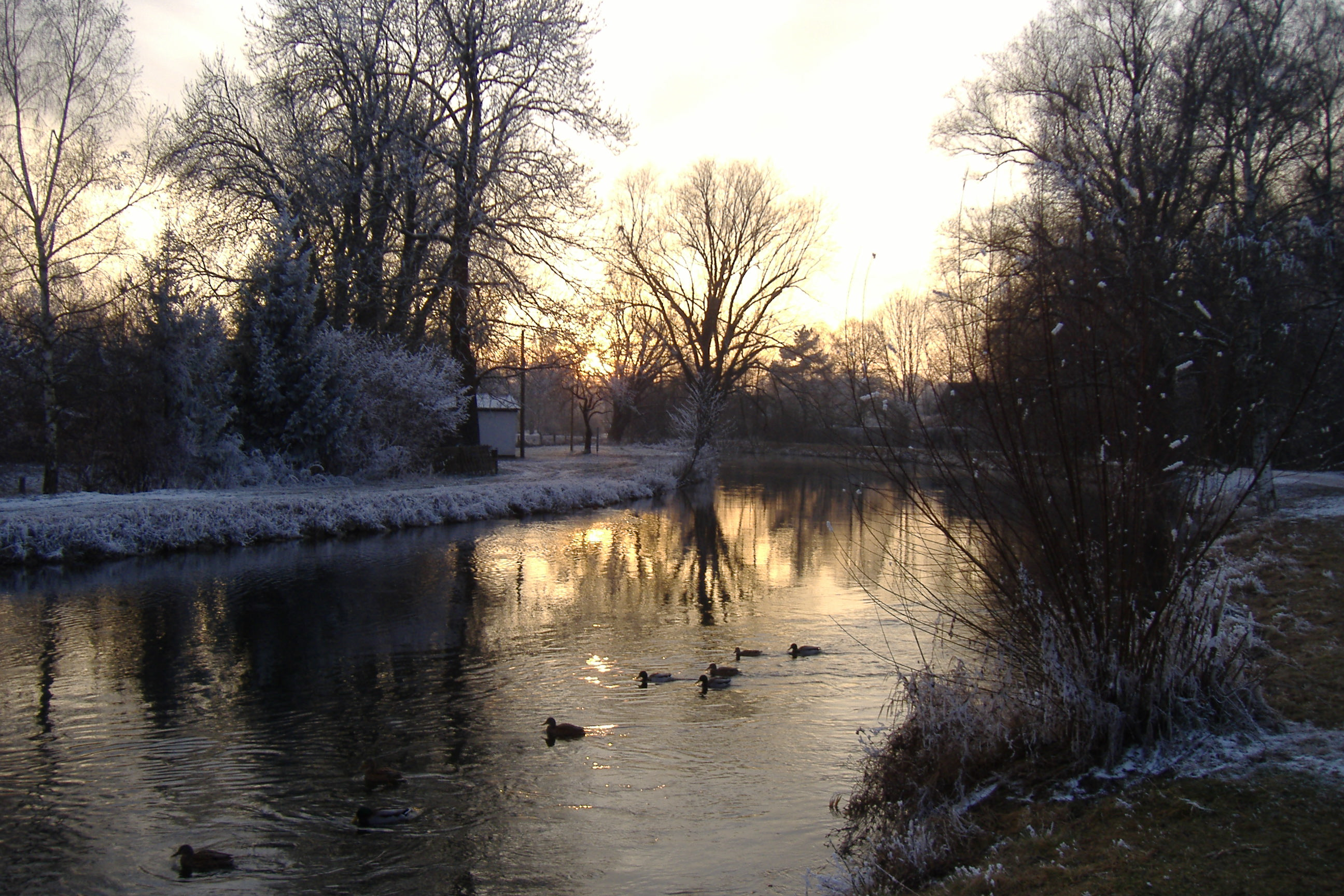
Mühlbach in Winter

Furthermore, the river Amper, its backwater Mühlbach and the local bird-park Vogelpark Olching, open spring to autumn, offer idyllic walks and views to locals and visitors. Nearby is the Schuttberg; (rubble-hill), a little hill between Olching and Esting (situated next to the Tony-März-Stadion, the home ground of SC Olching). Nowadays this mound is a popular spot for children, teenagers and adults alike for town-centre sledging during the winter.

Right next to the Schuttberg is the Volksfestplatz, (a fairground), a site which acts in the off-season as a cycle practice range, incorporates a go-kart training area, has a small skate-park and hosts monthly flea-markets throughout the summer. It is most popular, however, when it is used for the Olchinger Volksfest, which is Olching's very own Oktoberfest in May/June.

A further popular spot is the Olchinger See, which is a picturesque lake that attracts plenty of visitors from the surrounding area.

In 2024 construction work for a Spa in the norther business park began.

Olching has a communal indoor swimming pool, two minigolf courses, a large golf course and a bowling centre.

=== KOM Kulturwerkstatt am Olchinger Mühlbach ===
A listed building originating from 1877 that was sympathetically renovated and opened in 2004 for cultural events of all sorts. Located at the western end of the Hauptstrasse, its various intimate rooms are used for exhibitions, chamber and classical music performances, and seminars and meetings by various Olching clubs.

=== Events ===
==== Carnival Parade; Faschingsumzug ====
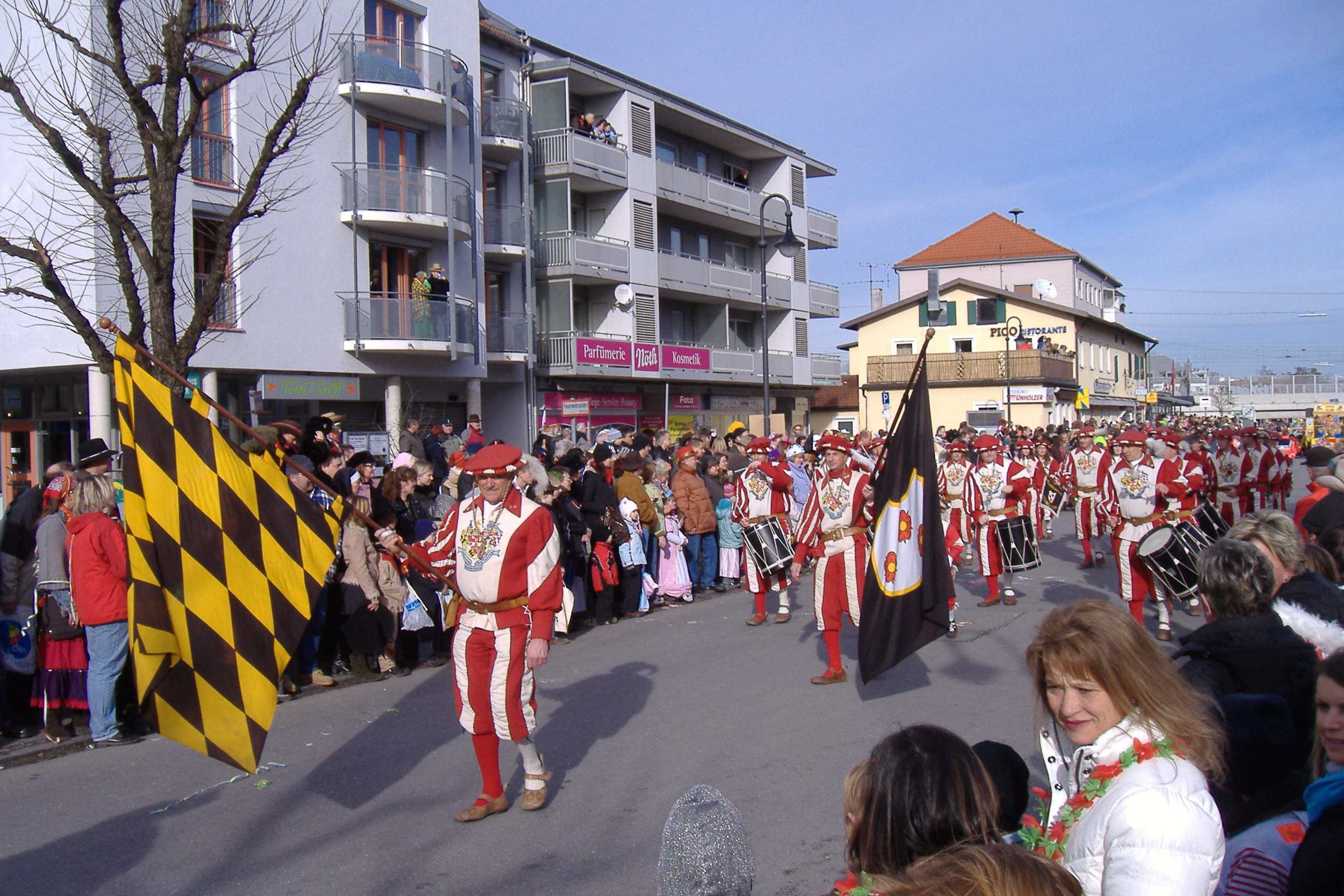
The Opening of the Olchinger Carnival Parade 2008

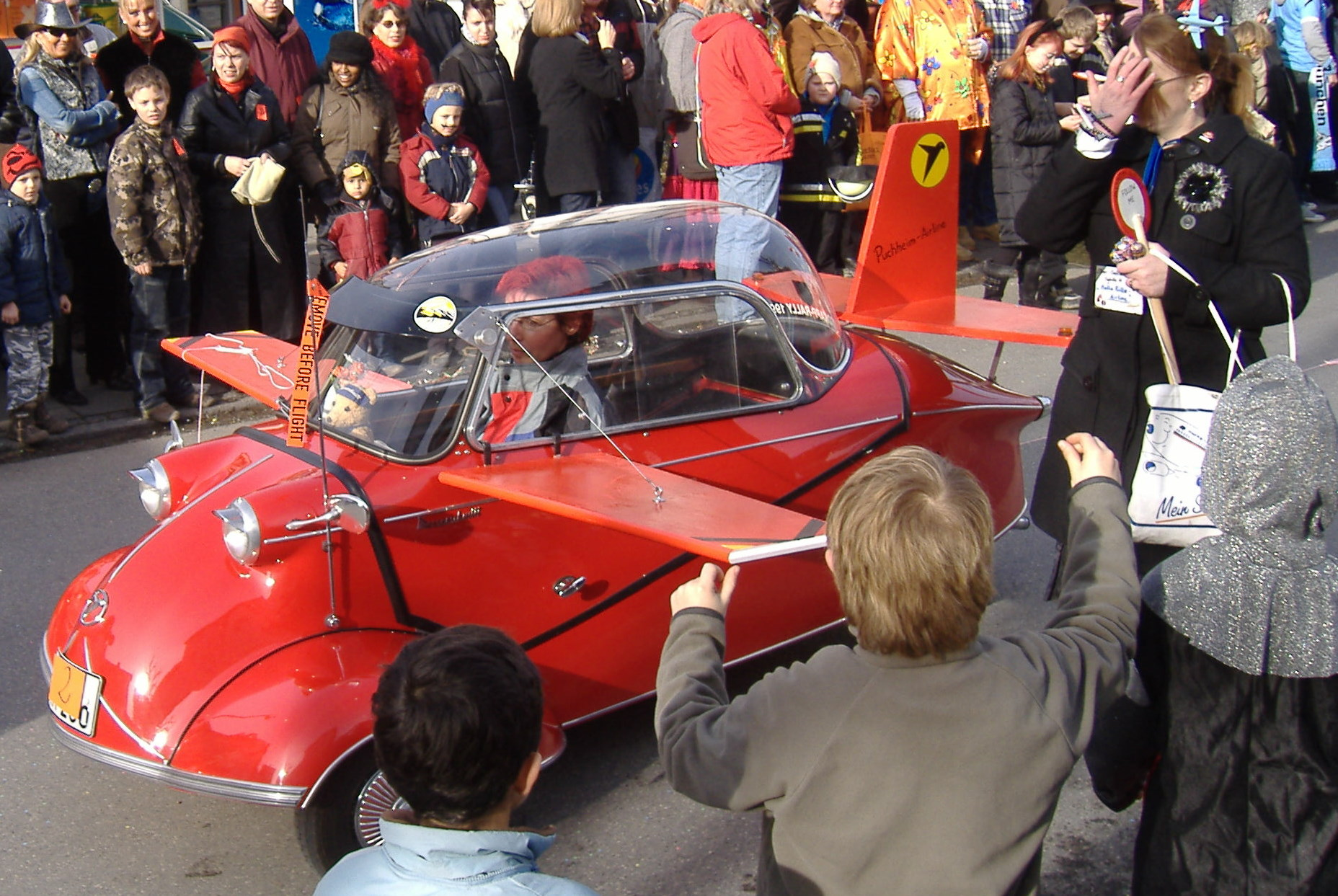
Messerschmidt Bubble Car at the Carnival Parade 2008

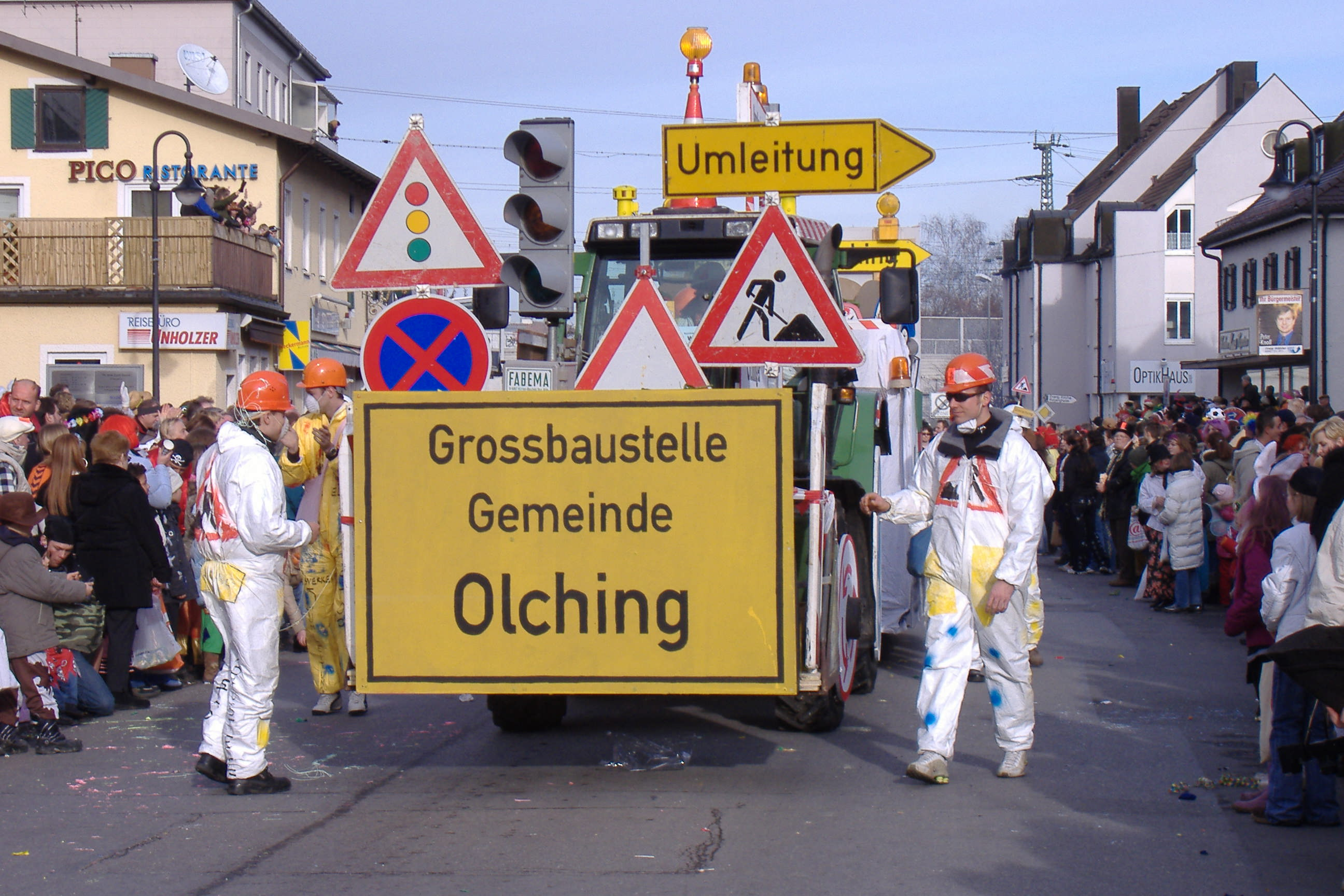
'Grossbaustelle' Carnival Float at the Carnival Parade 2008

The carnival parade (Faschingsumzug) takes place annually on Shrove Tuesday at 2:00 pm and has a long tradition in Olching. The first procession was organised by the so-called young farmers' club (Burschenverein) in 1923. Between 1938 and 1952, these parades were suspended due to the political environment and other factors such as World War II. It was only in 1953 when six masked men—three of them musicians—took to the streets on Faschingsdienstag that this tradition was reinstated on a regular basis.

The procession grew ever bigger due to the involvement of local clubs and groups. Over the course of time, the procession in Olching has become the largest in Upper Bavaria. Since 1953 it has only been cancelled on three occasions: In 1962 as a mark of respect for the victims of the catastrophic surge-tide in Hamburg; in 1990 due to a hurricane-force storm called Wiebke; and in 1991 due to the first Gulf War.

Over the following years as many as 30,000–40,000 spectators have attended this spectacle regularly in the hope of catching a handful of sweets that are thrown from the floats for the children and to laugh at the politically and satirically themed floats as the procession moves down the High Street (Hauptstrasse) in Olching.

==== Easter Fire; Osterfeuer ====
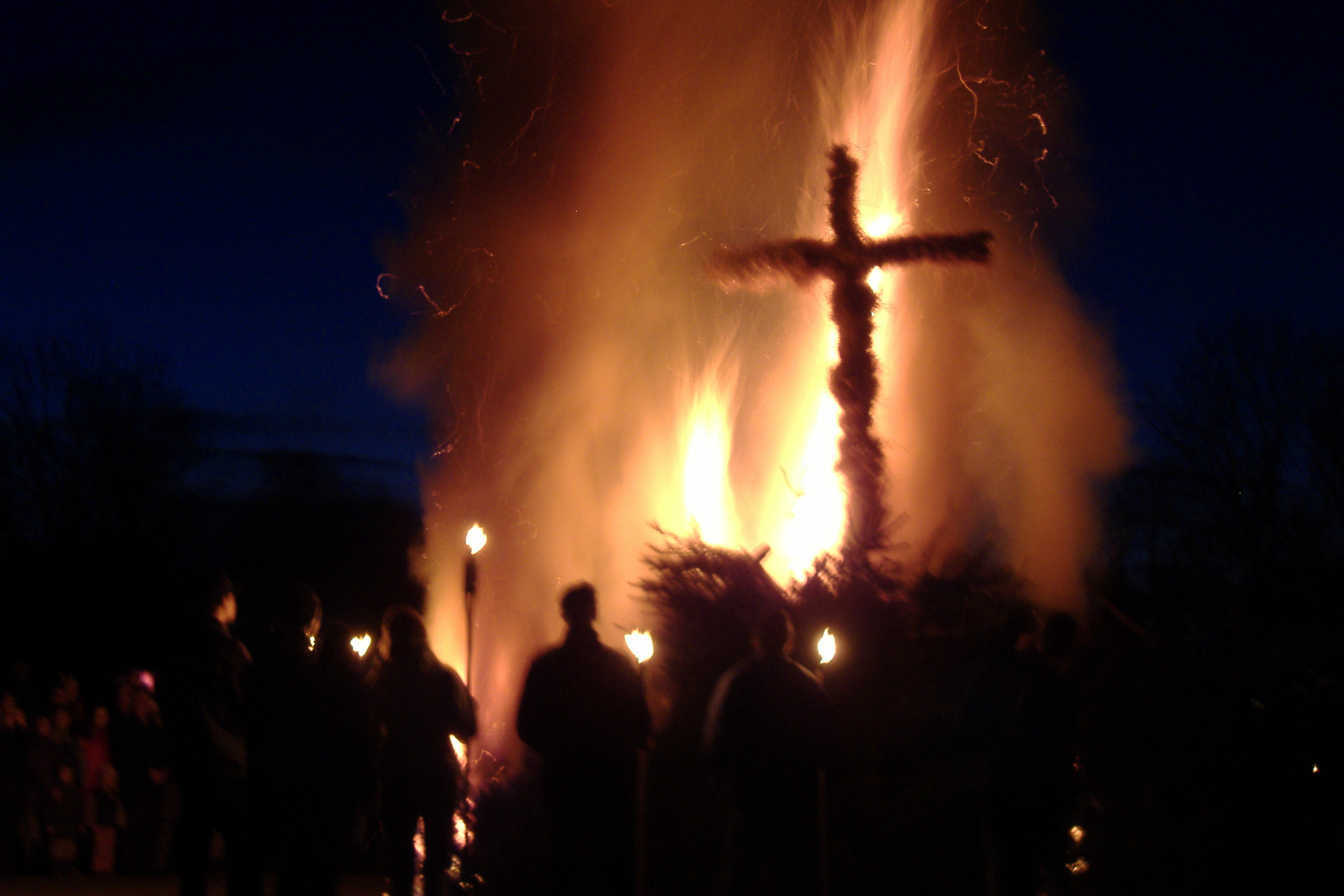
Osterfeuer, Easter Fire in Olching 2008

A tradition that is more widespread in northern and central parts of Germany, the Easter Fire, (Ger.), is also traditionally celebrated in Olching on the town's fairground (see below), the so-called Volksfestplatz. A large bonfire is lit after dusk on Easter Saturday. Spectators of the event can also browse the numerous stalls while the Olching volunteer fire brigade Freiwillige Feuerwehr manage the fire.

There is also an unofficial competition between neighboring communities and families, (typically in more rural areas) to see who can set up the largest fire. This is done to dispose of superfluous wood (including remaining Christmas trees) while earning donations for local charitable groups and organizations.

The origin of this festival in Germany is a mixture of pagan celebrations intended to drive away the winter and its evils, and Christian beliefs (another name for this celebration in parts of Bavaria and Austria is Judasfeuer (literally: Judas fire)).

==== Fair; Volksfest ====
The fair (Volksfest) in Olching takes place annually during the second holiday week of Whitsun (Pfingsten). The fair consists of rides, stalls, food and entertainment, and a large beer tent, which are set up on the Volksfestplatz (fairground). There are various themed events in the beer tent, including a regional boxing fight night. The community organises a broad range of events during the festival, including a popular large firework display, usually on the first Monday of the fair. The day of Corpus Christi is usually a raceday, which takes place at the Speedwaybahn as part of the festivities.

== Notable people ==
- Roman Neumayer (c. 1930–2015), ice hockey executive, coach and player, lived and died here
- Martin Smolinski, is a German international motorcycle speedway and Grasstrack rider who has represented the German speedway team at senior level. He is a former World Long Track champion and European Grasstrack champion

== Twin towns – sister cities ==
Olching is twinned with:

- Feurs, France
- Tuchola, Poland
