= Georg Hack =

West German speedway rider (1950–2026)

- Born: 20 February 1950; Landshut, Bavaria, West Germany
- Died: 2 November 2026 (aged 76)

Career history

West Germany
- 1974: Bopfingen
- 1975–1986: Landshut

Great Britain
- 1978–1979, 1983: Ipswich Witches

Individual honours
- 1982: Speedway World Championship finalist
- 1977, 1978, 1979, 1980, 1981, 1982, 1983, 1985: World Long Track finalist

Georg Hack (20 February 1950 – 2 November 2026) was a German international speedway rider. He earned 26 international caps for the West German national speedway team.

== Speedway career ==
Hack reached the final in the 1982 Individual Speedway World Championship, representing West Germany. He also reached the final of the Individual Speedway Long Track World Championship on eight occasions during the period 1977–1985.

Hack rode in the final of the 1981 and 1982 World Team Cup.

Hack rode in the top tier of British Speedway for Ipswich Witches.

== Personal Life ==
Hack was born on 2 February 1950 in Landshut, West Germany, and died on 2 November 2026, at the age of 76.

== World final appearances ==
=== Individual World Championship ===
- 1982: (United States) Los Angeles, Memorial Coliseum – 11th – 6pts
- 1984: (Sweden) Gothenburg, Ullevi – Reserve – Did not ride

=== World Pairs Championship ===
- 1978: (Poland) Chorzów, Silesian Stadium (with Hans Wassermann) – 6th – 13pts

=== World Team Cup ===
- 1981: (West Germany) Olching, Speedway Stadion Olching (with Egon Müller / Karl Maier / Georg Gilgenreiner) – 3rd – 28pts (5)
- 1982: (England) London, White City Stadium (with Karl Maier / Egon Müller / Alois Wiesböck / Georg Gilgenreiner) – 3rd – 18pts (5)
