= 1979 National League season =

British motorcycle speedway season

- League: National League
- No. of competitors: 19
- Champions: Mildenhall Fen Tigers
- Knockout Cup: Rye House Rockets
- Individual: Ian Gledhill
- Pairs: Milton Keynes Knights
- Fours: Ellesmere Port Gunners
- Highest average: Tom Owen
- Division/s above: 1979 British League

The 1979 National League was contested as the second division/tier of Speedway in the United Kingdom.

== Summary ==
The league was reduced from 20 teams to 19 from the previous season. White City Rebels closure saw their riders move to Eastbourne Eagles, who moved up to the British League and Barrow Furness Flyers dropped out. Teesside Tigers changed their name to Middlesbrough Tigers and Scunthorpe Saints changed their name to Scunthorpe Stags and left the Quibell Park Stadium for Ashby Ville Stadium. Long Eaton Stadium saw the return of speedway under the promotion of Dan McCormick but his decision to call the team the "Nottingham Outlaws" upset the supporters club.

Tom Owen of Newcastle topped the averages for the third consecutive year and Ian Gledhill, riding for Stoke won the Riders' Championship but both Newcastle and Stoke finished well behind Mildenhall Fen Tigers and Rye House Rockets in the league table. In a season that would go down to the last match, Mildenhall won their first title in their history. The consistency of four riders, Ray Bales, Mick Hines, Melvyn Taylor and Robert Henry was the crucial factor to their success.

There was a controversial end to the season when Rye House visited Mildenhall, needing a draw to win the title. Needing a 5-1 in the last heat to tie the match, Rocket Karl Fiala's exclusion prompted team-mate Bob Garrad to withdraw from the re-run in protest. Mildenhall went on to win at bottom club Scunthorpe Saints in the last match of the season to win the title by one point.

== Final table ==
Pos	Team	PL	W	D	L	Pts
1	Mildenhall Fen Tigers	36	30	0	6	60
2	Rye House Rockets	36	29	1	6	59
3	Oxford Cheetahs	36	24	1	11	49
4	Berwick Bandits	36	21	3	12	45
5	Milton Keynes Knights	36	21	0	15	42
6	Newcastle Diamonds	36	20	0	16	40
7	Glasgow Tigers	36	19	0	17	38
8	Peterborough Panthers	36	18	2	16	38
9	Ellesmere Port Gunners	36	18	1	17	37
10	Canterbury Crusaders	36	17	2	17	36
11	Middlesbrough Tigers	36	17	1	18	35
12	Crayford Kestrels	36	16	0	20	32
13	Stoke Potters	36	15	2	19	32
14	Nottingham Outlaws	36	14	1	21	29
15	Workington Comets	36	14	1	21	29
16	Boston Barracudas	36	13	2	21	28
17	Edinburgh Monarchs	36	13	1	22	27
18	Weymouth Wildcats	36	9	1	26	19
19	Scunthorpe Stags	36	4	1	31	9

== Fixtures and results ==
Home \ Away	BER	BOS	CAN	CRY	ED	EP	GLA	MID	MIL	MK	NEW	NOT	OX	PET	RH	SCU	STO	WEY	WOR
Berwick		52–25	57–21	45–33	55–23	44–34	40–38	52–26	45–33	50–28	46–32	54–24	60–18	53–25	39–39	57–21	48–30	57–20	56–22
Boston	36–42		39–39	59–19	51–26	31–46	43–35	33–45	50–28	53–25	38–40	37–41	42–36	44–34	39–38	48–30	42–35	45–33	46–32
Canterbury	34–44	45–33		43–35	55–23	46–32	49–29	45–33	42–36	42–36	47–31	53–25	38–39	39–39	35–43	63–15	43–35	43–35	59–19
Crayford	45–33	53–25	41–37		40–38	45–33	49–29	40–37	30–47	40–38	33–45	48–29	34–44	46–31	31–47	60–18	47–31	40–38	45–33
Edinburgh	40.5–37.5	49–28	48–30	41–37		46–31	41–37	40–38	29–49	35–43	36–41	47–31	36–42	35–43	33–45	59–19	38–40	46–32	48–30
Ellesmere Port	39–39	45–33	46–32	43–35	51–26		49–29	48–30	36–42	45–33	43–35	40–38	45–32	56–22	38–40	60–16	56–22	56–22	49–29
Glasgow	45–33	52–25	52–26	46–30	51–27	51–27		62–16	47–31	41–37	43–35	52–26	41–37	44–33	45–32	51–27	50–27	51–27	53–25
Middlesbrough	42–36	41–37	40–38	38–40	33–44	43–35	50–27		34–43	48–30	44–34	46–32	45–33	43–35	34–44	42–36	56–22	42–36	47–31
Mildenhall	59–18	48–30	46–32	60–18	49–29	50–28	55–23	55–23		50–27	54–24	55–23	52–26	42–35	43–34	60–18	49–29	52–26	56–22
Milton Keynes	52–26	47–31	46–32	46–32	45–32	49–29	54–24	46–32	36–41		35–42	46–31	38–39	41–37	41–36	51–26	43–35	43–35	39–38
Newcastle	41–37	54–24	51–26	54–24	57–21	41–37	45–33	43–35	37–41	38–40		38–40	37–41	55–23	36–42	59–18	50–28	46–31	40–38
Nottingham	39–39	45–33	35–43	45–33	47–31	48–30	52–26	49–28	36.5–41.5	37–41	40–38		33–45	44–34	36–42	46–32	48–30	43–35	51–27
Oxford	49–29	53–24	46–32	48–30	54–23	53–24	52–26	52–26	40–37	38–40	41–37	43–34		50–28	37–41	57–21	58–20	58–20	57–21
Peterborough	45–33	39–39	49–29	51–27	55–23	46–32	46–32	46–32	35–43	43–35	37–41	41–37	41–36		41–37	57–21	49–29	52–26	46–32
Rye House	49–27	60–18	53–25	60–18	55–22	61–17	54–24	57–21	46–32	40–38	51–27	47–31	45–33	45–33		59–18	58–20	60–18	47–31
Scunthorpe	38–39	36–40	37–40	37–41	39–39	38–40	36–42	36–42	32–45	37–41	37–40	41–37	31–45	41–36	25–53		32–42	44–34	41–37
Stoke	40–38	41–37	49–29	42–36	42–36	40–38	42–36	39–39	32–45	38–40	33–44	44–34	38–40	36–42	47–31	58–19		52–26	50–28
Weymouth	37–41	53–25	37–41	42–36	56–21	37–41	41–36	38–40	29–49	40–38	41–37	46–32	39–39	36–42	26–52	46–32	33.5–44.5		41–37
Workington	42–36	44–34	50–28	43–35	36–42	42–36	49–29	43–34	38–40	45–33	43–35	46–32	42–36	47–31	37–41	54–23	39–39	47–31	

Legend: Blue = home team win; Yellow = draw; Red = away team win.

== National League Knockout Cup ==
The 1979 National League Knockout Cup was the 12th edition of the Knockout Cup for tier two teams. Rye House Rockets were the winners of the competition.

First round

Date	Team one	Score	Team two
29/04	Rye House	56-22	Weymouth
22/05	Weymouth	34-44	Rye House
20/04	Edinburgh	46-32	Boston
10/06	Boston	44-34	Edinburgh

Second round

Date	Team one	Score	Team two
03/06	Rye House	54-24	Glasgow
08/06	Glasgow	47-31	Rye House
15/06	Workington	46-30	Middlesbrough
14/06	Middlesbrough	45-32	Workington
10/06	Mildenhall	53-25	Ellesmere Port
08/06	Ellesmere Port	41-37	Mildenhall
19/06	Crayford	44-34	Edinburgh
06/07	Edinburgh	39-39	Crayford
09/06	Berwick	60-18	Scunthorpe
04/06	Scunthorpe	38-40	Berwick
14/06	Oxford	45-33	Peterborough
08/06	Peterborough	34-44	Oxford
18/06	Newcastle	57-21	Canterbury
26/05	Canterbury	39-39	Newcastle
12/06	Milton Keynes	50-28	Stoke
09/06	Stoke	42-36	Milton Keynes

Quarter-finals

Date	Team one	Score	Team two
15/07	Rye House	59-19	Workington
29/06	Workington	49-29	Rye House
25/07	Mildenhall	56-22	Crayford
10/07	Crayford	39-39	Mildenhall
?	Berwick	51-27	Oxford
05/07	Oxford	44-34	Berwick
09/07	Newcastle	53-25	Milton Keynes
10/07	Milton Keynes	35-42	Newcastle

Semi-finals

Date	Team one	Score	Team two
27/08	Rye House	44-34	Mildenhall
26/08	Mildenhall	38-40	Rye House
22/09	Berwick	47-31	Newcastle
19/08	Newcastle	46-32	Berwick

=== Final ===
First leg

14 October 1979

Rye House Rockets Bob Garrad 10 Karl Fiala 10 Kelvin Mullarkey 10 Ashley Pullen 9 Ted Hubbar 8 Peter Tarrant 6 Simon Aindow 1	54 – 24	Berwick Bandits Wayne Brown 8 Nigel Close 6 Graham Jones 3 Mike Fullerton 3 Roger Wright 2 Phil Kynman 2 Rob Grant 0

Rye House Stadium

Second leg

27 October 1979

Berwick Bandits Roger Wright 10 Wayne Brown 10 Nigel Close 8 Graham Jones 4 Mike Caroline 4 Rob Grant 4 Phil Kynman 0	40 – 38	Rye House Rockets Karl Fiala 11 Bob Garrad 7 Kelvin Mullarkey 7 Ashley Pullen 5 Ted Hubbard 5 Peter Tarrant 3 Simon Aindow 0

Shielfield Park

Rye House were declared Knockout Cup Champions, winning on aggregate 92–64.

== Riders' Championship ==
Ian Gledhill won the Riders' Championship, sponsored by Gauloises and held at Wimbledon Stadium on 29 September 1979.

Pos.	Rider	Pts	Total
1	(England) Ian Gledhill	3 3 3 3 2	14
2	(England) Steve Wilcock	2 2 3 3 2	12
3	(England) Andy Grahame	1 3 2 3 2	11+3
4	(England) Nigel Boocock	2 2 3 1 3	11+2
5	(England) Alan Emerson	1 1 1 3 3	9
6	(England) Karl Fiala	3 1 2 2 1	9
7	(England) Rob Hollingworth	0 3 3 1 1	8
8	(England) John Jackson	3 2 1 2 0	8
9	(England) Les Rumsey	1 2 2 0 3	8
10	(England) Ray Bales	3 0 0 2 3	8
11	(England) Nigel Flatman	2 1 2 1 2	8
12	(England) Dave Perks	2 3 1 ret 1	7
13	(England) Steve Lawson	0 0 1 2 0	3
14	(England) Steve Naylor	0 1 0 1 1	3
15	(England) Brian Woodward	1 f 0 0 0	1
16	(England) Graham Jones	0 0 0 0 0	0
17	(England) Dave Brewer (res)	0	0

- f=fell, r-retired, ex=excluded, ef=engine failure

== Pairs ==
The National League Pairs was held at The Shay on 21 July and was won by Milton Keynes Knights.

Group A
Pos	Team	Pts	Riders
1	Milton Keynes	13	Humphreys 9 Grahame 4
2	Mildenhall	13	Hines 8 Taylor 5
3	Crayford	7	Naylor 5 Etheridge 2
4	Edinburgh	5	Mouncer 2 Stansfield 1

Group B
Pos	Team	Pts	Riders
1	Nottingham	15	Perks 8 Sampson 7
2	Boston	9	Allen 6 Featherstone 3
3	Rye House	6	Pullen 4 Fiala 2
4	Workington	6	Havelock 6 Dickinson 0

Group C
Pos	Team	Pts	Riders
1	Newcastle	12	Owen T 7 Blackadder 5
2	Middlesbrough	11	Wilcock 9 Courtney 2
3	Glasgow	9	Richardson 6 Lawson 3
4	Berwick	4	Fullerton 3 Jones 1

Group D
Pos	Team	Pts	Riders
1	Ellesmere P	11	Finch 6 Jackson 5
2	Stoke	11	Burton 6 Gledhill 5
3	Canterbury	11	Boocock 9 Sheard (G) 2
4	Oxford	1	Rumsey 1 Hunter 0

Semi finals

- Milton Keynes bt Newcastle
- Ellesmere Port bt Nottingham

Final

- Milton Keynes bt Ellesmere Port

== Fours ==
Ellesmere Port Gunners won the fours championship final, held at the East of England Arena on 29 July.

Semi finals

- SF1 = Peterborough 18, Ellesmere Port 14, Rye House 12, Oxford 4
- SF2 = Mildenhall 18, Berwick 11, Newcastle 10, Boston 9

Final

Pos	Team	Pts	Riders
1	Ellesmere Port Gunners	17	Jackson 6, Carr L 6, Finch 5, Ellams 0, Monaghan 0
2	Mildenhall Fen Tigers	15	Hines 5, Bales 4, Taylor 3, Henry 3
3	Peterborough Panthers	9	Gooderham 4, Flatman 2, Hines 1, Spink 1, Clark B 1
4	Berwick Bandits	7	Brown 5, Close 2, Kynman 0, Jones 0, Matthews 0

== Final leading averages ==
The top ten averages of the National League.

	Rider	Nat	Team	C.M.A.
1	Tom Owen	(England)	Newcastle Diamonds	11.18
2	George Hunter	(Scotland)	Oxford Cheetahs	10.86
3	Dave Perks	(England)	Nottingham Outlaws	10.13
4	Les Rumsey	(England)	Oxford Cheetahs	9.78
5	Mike Sampson	(England)	Nottingham Outlaws	9.62
6	Andy Grahame	(England)	Milton Keynes Knights	9.57
7	Steve Finch	(England)	Ellesmere Port Gunners	9.52
8	Ray Bales	(England)	Mildenhall Fen Tigers	9.51
9	Mick Hines	(England)	Mildenhall Fen Tigers	9.31
10	John Jackson	(England)	Ellesmere Port Gunners	9.27

== Riders & final averages ==
Berwick

- Steve McDermott 9.13
- Wayne Brown 9.00
- Mike Fullerton 7.71
- Graham Jones 7.58
- Nigel Close 7.24
- Phil Kynman 6.20
- Roger Wright 6.16
- Mike Caroline 4.36
- Rob Grant Sr. 4.00

Boston

- David Gagen 9.27
- Rob Hollingworth 8.91
- Dave Allen 8.23
- Tony Featherstone 6.12
- Dennis Mallett 4.85
- Andy Fisher 4.48
- Dave Mortiboys 3.80
- Andy Hibbs 3.67
- Colin Ackroyd 2.60

Canterbury

- Mike Ferreira 8.35
- Nigel Boocock 8.32
- Barney Kennett 7.17
- Dave Piddock 7.00
- Tim Hunt 6.93
- Roger Abel 5.08
- Mick Wilde 4.13
- Graham Clifton 4.11
- Peter Christopher 4.00
- Neil Farnish 3.92
- Tony Reynolds 2.67

Crayford

- Steve Naylor 9.03
- Alan Sage 8.14
- Laurie Etheridge 8.00
- Paul Woods 7.63
- Les Rumsey 4.76
- Richard Davey 4.26
- Paul Gilbert 3.53
- Paul Hollingsbee 3.37
- John Hooper 3.31
- Jack Bibby 0.94

Edinburgh

- Dave Trownson 7.78
- Steve Lomas 7.18
- Bert Harkins 6.72
- Brian Collins 6.56
- Alan Bridgett 5.51
- Ivan Blacka 5.30
- Benny Rourke 5.25
- Rob Mouncer 5.21
- Roger Lambert 3.03

Ellesmere Port

- Steve Finch 9.52
- John Jackson 9.27
- Louis Carr 6.95
- John Williams 5.98
- Pete Ellams 5.23
- Eric Monaghan 4.69
- Robert Craven 4.00
- Paul Tyrer 3.83
- Paul Embley 3.80
- Peter Carr 2.44

Glasgow

- Merv Janke 9.06
- Steve Lawson 9.06
- Derek Richardson 8.05
- Andy Reid 6.25
- Colin Caffrey 6.12
- Charlie McKinna 5.89
- Jim Beaton 5.76
- Keith Bloxsome 5.23

Middlesbrough

- Steve Wilcock 8.97
- Malcolm Corradine 7.88
- Geoff Pusey 6.96
- Mark Courtney 6.92
- Martin Dixon 5.02
- Martyn Cusworth 4.76
- Paul Stead 3.77
- Mike Sanderson 1.90

Mildenhall

- Ray Bales 9.51
- Mick Hines 9.31
- Melvyn Taylor 9.06
- Robert Henry 8.87
- Mike Spink 6.58
- Mick Bates 6.52
- Richard Knight 5.66
- Mark Baldwin 4.96

Milton Keynes

- Andy Grahame 9.57
- Bob Humphreys 9.29
- Derek Harrison 8.04
- Malcolm Holloway 5.96
- David Ashby 5.43
- Harry Maclean 4.41
- Greg McNeill 3.93
- Chris Robins 3.59

Newcastle

- Tom Owen 11.18
- Robbie Blackadder 7.93
- Rod Hunter 7.86
- Graeme Stapleton 6.57
- David Bargh 5.91
- Neil Coddington 5.75
- Nigel Crabtree 4.72
- Paul Brown 1.90
- Mick Easton 1.60

Nottingham

- Dave Perks 10.13
- Mike Sampson 9.62
- Kevin Hawkins 8.03
- Glenn MacDonald 5.28
- Les Sawyer 5.07
- Nigel Wasley 4.83
- Craig Featherby 4.82
- John Homer 3.19
- Mark Williams 1.07

Oxford

- George Hunter 10.86
- Les Rumsey 9.78
- Pip Lamb 9.27
- John Hack 6.81
- Carl Askew 6.62
- John Barker 6.47
- Mick Handley 5.32
- Colin Ackroyd 3.15
- Rob Dole 2.60

Peterborough

- Nigel Flatman 8.52
- Richard Greer 7.50
- Dave Gooderham 7.33
- Andy Hines 7.26
- Ian Clark 6.71
- Nigel Couzens 6.06
- Brian Clark 5.77
- Peter Spink 5.70
- Steve Popely 4.41
- Paul Tapp 4.00
- Ken Matthews 3.69

Rye House

- Karl Fiala 9.20
- Bobby Garrad 9.11
- Kelvin Mullarkey 8.71
- Kevin Smith 8.19
- Ted Hubbard 8.16
- Ashley Pullen 7.34
- Hugh Saunders 6.57
- Peter Tarrant 5.23

Scunthorpe

- Phil White 7.59
- Arthur Browning 7.28
- Rob Maxfield 6.77
- Arthur Price 4.73
- Kevin Teager 4.18
- Trevor Whiting 3.78
- Stuart Cope 3.25
- Ian Jeffcoate 3.19
- Phil Cain 2.78
- Rob Woffinden 2.50

Stoke

- Ian Gledhill 8.21
- Billy Burton 7.06
- Tony Lomas 6.76
- Chris Turner 6.42
- Ian Robertson 6.19
- Stuart Mountford 6.17
- Nicky Allott 5.57
- Frank Smith 5.53
- Alan MacLean 3.33
- Ian Jeffcoate 2.94
- Paul Evitts 2.31

Weymouth

- Brian Woodward 8.01
- Doug Underwood 7.19
- Bob Coles 7.09
- Malcolm Shakespeare 6.23
- Terry Tulloch 4.74
- Garry May 4.20
- Kevin Bowen 3.70
- Nigel Davis 3.24
- Mark DeKok 2.15

Workington

- Alan Emerson 8.99
- Brian Havelock 7.58
- Arnold Haley 6.87
- Ian Hindle 6.7
- Mark Dickinson 6.54
- Neil Collins 6.13
- Andy Margarson
- Mick Blaynee 3.88
- Des Wilson 3.60
- Tim Nichol 1.91

== See also ==
- List of United Kingdom Speedway League Champions
- Knockout Cup (speedway)
