= Louis Carr (speedway rider) =

English speedway rider

- Born: 28 January 1960 (age 66); Preston, England
- Nationality: British (English)

Career history
- 1976–1980, 1985: Ellesmere Port Gunners
- 1979: Hull Vikings
- 1979, 1984: Exeter Falcons
- 1979: Birmingham Brummies
- 1979: Cradley Heathens
- 1979, 1980: Swindon Robins
- 1979: Poole Pirates
- 1979: Coventry Bees
- 1980–1983, 1988, 1995: Belle Vue Aces
- 1984, 1988: Wolverhampton Wolves
- 1985–1987: Ipswich Witches
- 1988–1990: Stoke Potters
- 1991–1994: Sheffield Tigers

Individual honours
- 1986: British Championship finalist

Team honours
- 1982: British League Champion
- 1985: National League Champion
- 1985: National League Best Pairs
- 1979, 1990: National League Fours Champion
- 1983: British League Cup Winner

John Louis Carr (born 28 January 1960) is a former speedway rider from England.

== Speedway career ==
Carr reached the final of the British Speedway Championship in 1986. He rode in the top tier of British Speedway from 1976–1995, riding for various clubs.

In 1979, Carr helped the Ellesmere Port Gunners win the Fours Championship during the 1979 National League season.

In 1985, Carr won the National League Pairs partnering Joe Owen for Ellesmere Port, during the 1985 National League season.

Eleven years later in 1990, Carr would win a second fours championship with Stoke Potters.

== Family ==
Carr's brother Peter was also a speedway rider.
