= John Jackson (speedway rider) =

British speedway rider

- Born: 26 June 1952 (age 74); Chester, Cheshire, England
- Nationality: British (English)

Career history
- 1970–1974: Crewe Kings
- 1970, 1972: King's Lynn Stars
- 1971: Oxford Cheetahs
- 1973–1975: Halifax Dukes
- 1975–1982: Ellesmere Port Gunners
- 1976: Wolverhampton Wolves
- 1983: Stoke Potters

Individual honours
- 1976, 1978: National League Riders' runner-up

Team honours
- 1972: British League Div 2 Winner
- 1972: British League Div 2 KO Cup Winner
- 1976, 1978: National League Pairs Winner
- 1979: National League Fours Champion

John Jackson (born 26 June 1952) is a former speedway rider from England.

== Speedway career ==
Jackson rode in the top two tiers of British Speedway from 1970 to 1983, riding for various clubs.

Jackson was instrumental in helping the Crewe Kings to win the league title during the 1972 British League Division Two season. He consistently appeared in the leading averages throughout the 1970s.

From 1975 to 1982, Jackson was the leading rider for Ellesmere Port Gunners. He won the National League Pairs, partnering Chris Turner for the Ellesmere Port, during the 1976 National League season. He won another Pairs championship, partnering Steve Finch, during the 1978 National League season.

In 1979, Jackson helped the Ellesmere Port win the Fours Championship during the 1979 National League season.
