= 1978 National League season =

British motorcycle speedway season

- League: National League
- No. of competitors: 20
- Champions: Canterbury Crusaders
- Knockout Cup: Eastbourne Eagles
- Individual: Steve Koppe
- Pairs: Ellesmere Port Gunners
- Fours: Peterborough Panthers
- Highest average: Tom Owen
- Division/s above: 1978 British League

The 1978 National League was contested as the second division of Speedway in the United Kingdom.

== Summary ==
Newport Dragons dropped out of the league after just one season of second tier racing following a dispute over rent at Somerton Park.

Ttwo new entrants – Milton Keynes Knights and Barrow Furness Flyers – saw the league expanded to twenty teams. Weymouth changed their nickname from Wizards to Wildcats.

Former Leicester and Teesside promoter Ron Wilson brought speedway to Milton Keynes with a team called the Knights who would race at the Milton Keynes Greyhound Stadium (known in speedway circles as the Groveway).

Canterbury Crusaders won the National League title. Although equal on points with Newcastle Diamonds they won by virtue of the fact that their race points difference was greater than their rival. It was Canterbury's second title win in eight years, previously winning in 1970. The Crusaders were led by heavy scoring from Les Rumsey and Riders' Champion Steve Koppe, while Newcastle's Tom Owen topped the averages for the second consecutive year.

Earlier in the season 18 year-old junior rider Chris Prime was representing Newcastle when he was killed in the National League match against Mildenhall on 3 April.

== Final table ==
Pos	Team	PL	W	D	L	Pts
1	Canterbury Crusaders	38	30	0	8	60
2	Newcastle Diamonds	38	29	2	7	60
3	Rye House Rockets	38	27	0	11	54
4	Eastbourne Eagles	38	25	1	12	51
5	Ellesmere Port Gunners	38	24	0	14	48
6	Peterborough Panthers	38	22	1	15	45
7	Oxford Cheetahs	38	20	4	14	44
8	Stoke Potters	38	21	1	16	43
9	Glasgow Tigers	38	19	1	18	39
10	Crayford Kestrels	38	16	2	20	34
11	Berwick Bandits	38	17	0	21	34
12	Mildenhall Fen Tigers	38	16	1	21	33
13	Weymouth Wildcats	38	16	0	22	32
14	Workington Comets	38	16	0	22	32
15	Edinburgh Monarchs	38	15	1	22	31
16	Milton Keynes Knights	38	12	6	20	30
17	Boston Barracudas	38	13	2	23	28
18	Teesside Tigers	38	12	0	26	24
19	Scunthorpe Saints	38	9	2	27	20
20	Barrow Furness Flyers	38	8	2	28	18

== Fixtures and results ==
Home \ Away	BAR	BER	BOS	CAN	CRY	EAS	ED	EP	GLA	MIL	MK	NEW	OX	PET	RH	SCU	STO	TEE	WEY	WOR
Barrow		52–25	41–37	28–50	43–35	39–39	33–45	35–43	40–37	20–58	39–39	24–54	34–44	35–43	36.5–41.5	48–30	34–43	44–34	43–35	41–37
Berwick	45–33		52–26	42–36	50–28	46–32	54–24	46–31	53–25	44–34	37–41	37–41	48–29	56–22	40–38	57–21	55–23	54–24	47–31	45–33
Boston	48–29	45–32		35–42	42–35	40–38	34–44	37–41	40–37	42–36	40–38	41–37	39–39	26–51	37–41	46–32	43–35	49–29	45–33	38–40
Canterbury	53–25	59–19	53–25		56–22	45–33	51–27	47–31	53–25	48–30	47–31	36–42	44–34	49–29	59–17	48–30	40–38	48–30	50–28	47–31
Crayford	53–25	52–25	47–31	37–41		34–44	44–34	47–31	55–23	48–29	42–36	39–39	41–37	45–33	32–44	54–24	52–25	44–34	49–28	49–29
Eastbourne	54–24	61–17	42–35	48–29	58–20		46–31	46–32	57–21	54–24	61–17	42–35	51–27	46–32	54–24	56–22	56–20	57–20	49–26	54–23
Edinburgh	50–28	55–22	63–14	36–42	40–38	32–46		29–49	41–37	35–43	37–40	32–46	41–37	43–35	36–42	45–33	46–32	46–32	40–36	53–25
Ellesmere Port	61–17	53–25	50–28	40–38	44–34	48–30	46–31		48–30	45–32	46–32	43–35	50–28	40–38	43–35	38–16	52–26	53–25	50–28	46–32
Glasgow	45–33	49–27	53–22	33–45	42–36	45–33	48–30	37–40		49–28	45–33	40–38	41–37	51–27	41–37	49–29	44–34	50–28	42–36	46–32
Mildenhall	50–28	50–28	47–30	35–43	56–22	38–40	38–40	37–41	55–23		54–24	36–42	45–33	48–30	45–33	41–36	41–37	38–40	51–27	53–25
Milton Keynes	57–20	41–37	39–39	31–47	43–35	42–35	39–39	43–35	39–39	44–34		26–52	39–39	38–40	37–41	39–39	33–45	48–30	41–37	40–38
Newcastle	52–26	57–21	50–28	42–36	52–25	40–38	61–17	41–37	62–16	40–38	47–31		32–45	49–29	37–41	48–30	53–25	56–22	45–32	48–30
Oxford	62.5–15.5	61–17	55–23	41–37	57–21	42–36	51–27	50–28	58–19	39–39	58–20	39–39		38–40	43–35	47–31	43–35	50–27	42–35	57–21
Peterborough	56–22	51–27	44–34	36–42	54–24	47–31	51–27	51–27	51–27	43–35	47–30	33–45	56–22		41–37	44–34	39–39	50–28	55–23	56–22
Rye House	59–19	54–24	60–18	42–36	48–30	42–36	54–24	40–38	58–20	40–38	59–19	45–33	46–31	46–32		50–28	52–26	58–20	45–33	57–21
Scunthorpe	45–33	48–30	43–35	31–47	39–39	37–41	50–28	40–38	38–40	35–43	46–30	35–43	28–50	42–36	36–42		35–43	42–36	34–43	43–35
Stoke	53–25	57–21	56–22	29–49	57–21	48–30	51–27	42–36	54–24	42–36	41–37	38–40	45–33	44–34	47–31	47–31		55–23	43–35	43–35
Teesside	48–30	50–28	36–42	42–36	34–44	33–45	41–37	40–38	46–31	40–37	38–40	36–41	38–40	44–34	36–42	42–36	47–31		34–44	44–34
Weymouth	54–24	49–28	51–27	32–45	41–37	28–50	41–37	50–28	46–32	42–36	54–24	34–44	43–35	32–45	42–36	56–22	38–40	57–21		45–32
Workington	40–38	49–28	53–25	33–45	51–27	43–35	47–31	41–36	37–41	48–30	49–29	38–40	52–26	35–43	40–38	58–20	40–38	53–25	42–35	

Legend: Blue = home team win; Yellow = draw; Red = away team win.

== National League Knockout Cup ==
The 1978 National League Knockout Cup was the 11th edition of the Knockout Cup for tier two teams. Eastbourne Eagles were the winners of the competition for the second successive year.

First round

Date	Team one	Score	Team two
13/05	Stoke	51–27	Workington
12/05	Workington	40–38	Stoke
29/05	Newcastle	43–33	Teesside
01/06	Teesside	39–39	Newcastle
21/05	Rye House	58–20	Milton Keynes
23/05	Milton Keynes	26–52	Rye House
19/05	Ellesmere Port	47–31	Berwick
21/05	Berwick	35–42	Ellesmere Port

Second round

Date	Team one	Score	Team two
11/06	Eastbourne	57–21	Scunthorpe
12/06	Scunthorpe	28–47	Eastbourne
23/06	Peterborough	43–35	Barrow
20/06	Barrow	33–45	Peterborough
08/06	Oxford	47–31	Stoke
10/06	Stoke	43–35	Oxford
25/06	Mildenhall	56–21	Newcastle
26/06	Newcastle	40–38	Mildenhall
11/06	Rye House	52–26	Glasgow
16/06	Glasgow	39–39	Rye House
04/07	Crayford	46–32	Edinburgh
30/06	Edinburgh	40–38	Crayford
17/06	Canterbury	48–27	Weymouth
20/06	Weymouth	37–41	Canterbury
07/07	Ellesmere Port	54–23	Boston
25/06	Boston	36–42	Ellesmere Port

Quarter-finals

Date	Team one	Score	Team two
06/08	Eastbourne	45–30	Peterborough
11/08	Peterborough	39–38	Eastbourne
10/08	Oxford	43–34	Mildenhall
09/07	Mildenhall	40–38	Oxford
09/07	Rye House	44–34	Crayford
18/07	Crayford	39–39	Rye House
12/08	Canterbury	55–23	Ellesmere
28/07	Ellesmere	48–30	Canterbury

Semi-finals

Date	Team one	Score	Team two
27/08	Eastbourne	56–22	Oxford
07/09	Oxford	32–45	Eastbourne
24/09	Rye House	57–20	Canterbury
30/09	Canterbury	41–37	Rye House

=== Final ===
First leg

22 October 1978

Eastbourne Eagles Dave Kennett 10 Mike Sampson 9 Steve Naylor 9 Eric Dugard 8 Roger Abel 6 Paul Woods 4 Ian Fletcher 0	46–32	Rye House Rockets Bob Garrad 11 Ted Hubbard 7 Ashley Pullen 6 Kelvin Mullarkey 4 Kevin Smith 2 Karl Fiala 1 Hugh Saunders 1

Arlington Stadium

Second leg

29 October 1978

Rye House Rockets Ted Hubbard 10 Kelvin Mullarkey 9 Bob Garrad 9 Hugh Saunders 5 Karl Fiala 4 Kevin Smith 4 Ashley Pullen 0	41–37	Eastbourne Eagles Eric Dugard 11 Dave Kennett 7 Mike Sampson 6 Roger Abel 4 Paul Woods 4 Steve Naylor 3 Ian Fletcher 2

Rye House Stadium

Eastbourne were declared Knockout Cup Champions, winning on aggregate 83–73.

== Riders' Championship ==
Steve Koppe won the Riders' Championship, held at Wimbledon Stadium on 23 September 1978.

Pos.	Rider	Pts	Total
1	(Australia) Steve Koppe	3 3 3 2 3	14
2	(England) John Jackson	3 3 2 2 3	13
3	(England) Ted Hubbard	3 2 2 3 2	12+3
4	(England) Dave Gooderham	1 2 3 3 3	12+2
5	(England) Ray Bales	2 0 3 3 3	11
6	(England) Tom Owen	1 1 2 3 2	9
7	(England) Arthur Price	3 2 2 1 1	9
8	(England) Danny Kennedy	0 1 3 2 2	8
9	(England) Laurie Etheridge	2 3 0 1 1	7
10	(England) Tony Lomas	1 1 1 2 1	6
11	(England) Graham Jones	1 3 1 0 0	5
12	(England) Rob Hollingworth	0 2 1 1 0	4
13	(Scotland) George Hunter	2 1	3
14	(England) Steve Wilcock (res)	1 1 0 1	3
15	(England) Nicky Allott	0 0 0 0 2	2
16	(England) Mike Sampson	2	2
17	(England) Steve Lawson	0 0 0 0 0	0

== Pairs ==
The National League Pairs was held at The Shay on 15 July and was won by Ellesmere Port.

Group A
Pos	Team	Pts	Riders
1	Newcastle	15	Owen T 9 Blackadder 6
2	Stoke	10	Lomas 6 Harrhy 4
3	Crayford	6	Etheridge 3 Sage 3
4	Oxford	5	Hunter 3 Hack 2

Group B
Pos	Team	Pts	Riders
1	Eastbourne	11	Sampson 9 Naylor 2
2	Peterborough	10	Gooderham 8 Hines A 2
3	Workington	9	Price 6 Maxfield 3
4	Berwick	6	Jones 4 Hiftle 2

Group C
Pos	Team	Pts	Riders
1	Canterbury	13	Rumsey 7 Koppe 6
2	Edinburgh	8	Hollingworth 4 Lomas 4
3	Mildenhall	8	Coles 4 Taylor 4
4	Scunthorpe	7	White 4 Allott 3

Group D
Pos	Team	Pts	Riders
1	Ellesmere P	15	Jackson 9 Finch 6
2	Rye House	8	Fiala 5 Hubbard 3
3	Glasgow	7	Lawson 5 Janke 2
4	Weymouth	5	Kennedy 4 Shakespeare 1

Semi finals

- Newcastle bt Canterbury
- Ellesmere Port bt Eastbourne

Final

- Ellesmere Port bt Newcastle

== Fours ==
Peterborough won the fours championship final for the second successive year, held at the East of England Arena on 30 July.

Semi finals

- SF1 = Stoke 13, Peterborough 12, Newcastle 12, Edinburgh 10
- SF2 = Canterbury 16, Weymouth 12, Ellesmere Port 12, Eastbourne 8

Final

Pos	Team	Pts	Riders
1	Peterborough Panthers	18	Couzens 6, Flatman 5, Hunt 4, Gooderham 3
2	Stoke Potters	12	Robertson 4, Lomas 3, Harrhy 3, Mountford 2
3	Canterbury Crusaders	9	Koppe 4, Clifton 3, Ferreira 2, Rumsey 0
4	Ellesmere Port Gunners	9	Ellams 4, Collins 3, Carr L 2, Finch 0, Jackson 0

== Top Five Riders ==
	Rider	Nat	Team	C.M.A.
1	Tom Owen	(England)	Newcastle	10.82
2	Bob Humphreys	(Australia)	Milton Keynes	10.59
3	John Jackson	(England)	Ellesmere Port	10.36
4	Les Rumsey	(England)	Canterbury	9.81
5	Mike Sampson	(England)	Eastbourne	9.74

== Riders & final averages ==
Barrow

- Charlie Monk 8.20
- Geoff Pusey 7.22
- Chris Bevan 6.82
- Andy Reid 5.53
- Chris Roynon 5.01
- Ken Murray 4.23
- Mark Courtney 3.61
- Chris Robins 3.13
- Malcolm Chambers 2.29
- Gary Pottenger 2.29
- Les Race 1.74
- Dave Butt 1.73
- Des Wilson 1.25

Berwick

- Graham Jones 8.79
- Roger Wright 7.66
- Mike Hiftle 6.40
- Willie Templeton 6.12
- Mike Fullerton 6.02
- Dave Gifford 5.62
- Colin Caffrey 4.25
- Wayne Brown 3.94
- Ian Darling 2.72

Boston

- Gary Guglielmi 8.38
- Tony Boyle 7.95
- Steve Clarke 7.11
- Dave Allen 7.02
- Paul Gilbert 6.50
- Stuart Cope 5.36
- Andy Fisher 5.33
- Craig Featherby 5.26
- Dave Mortiboys 4.94
- Ron Cooper 4.13
- Roger Lambert 4.00
- Keith Bloxsome 3.79
- Dennis Mallett 2.93

Canterbury

- Les Rumsey 9.81
- Steve Koppe 9.68
- Graham Banks 8.11
- Mike Ferreira 7.65
- Bob Spelta 7.54
- Graham Clifton 7.48
- Brendan Shiletto 6.58
- Barney Kennett 6.48
- Dave Piddock 5.65
- Derek Hole 3.71

Crayford

- Laurie Etheridge 9.34
- Alan Sage 8.63
- Alan Johns 6.28
- Pete Wigley 5.19
- Richard Davey 5.18
- Tony Featherstone 5.02
- John Hooper 4.36

Eastbourne

- Mike Sampson 9.74
- Dave Kennett 8.93
- Eric Dugard 8.88
- Roger Abel 7.40
- Steve Naylor 7.31
- Paul Woods 6.64
- Colin Ackroyd 5.94
- John Barker 5.78

Edinburgh

- Rob Hollingworth 7.39
- Bert Harkins 7.17
- Steve Lomas 6.93
- Dave Trownson 6.55
- Brian Collins 6.04
- Steve McDermott 6.00
- Ivan Blacka 5.11
- Alan Morrison 4.67
- Alan Bridgett 4.75
- Mark Stokes 2.00

Ellesmere Port

- John Jackson 10.36
- Steve Finch 9.28
- Phil Collins 8.70
- John Williams 5.77
- Louis Carr 5.73
- Paul Tyrer 5.13
- Pete Ellams 4.39
- Steve Taylor 4.06
- Neil Collins 2.87

Glasgow

- Steve Lawson 7.93
- Derek Richardson 7.52
- Merv Janke 7.51
- Benny Rourke 6.68
- Colin Farquharson 4.64
- Jim Beaton 4.49
- Charlie McKinna 3.54
- Keith Bloxsome 3.50
- Terry Kelly 3.48
- Mick Newton 2.97

Mildenhall

- Ray Bales 9.12
- Bob Coles 8.35
- Melvyn Taylor 8.35
- Robert Henry 6.47
- Neil Leeks 6.31
- Mike Spink 6.26
- Mick Bates 5.43
- Richard Knight 4.31

Milton Keynes

- Bob Humphreys 10.59
- Derek Harrison 6.87
- Chris Robins 6.52
- Andy Grahame 6.17
- Malcolm Holloway 5.39
- Cliff Anderson 4.93
- Phil Bass 4.82
- Harry Maclean 4.57
- Richard Evans 3.04

Newcastle

- Tom Owen 10.82
- Robbie Blackadder 9.10
- Kenny Carter 7.58
- Robbie Gardner 7.40
- Graeme Stapleton 6.55
- Rod Hunter 6.54
- Neil Coddington 4.16
- Nigel Crabtree 3.56

Oxford

- George Hunter 9.53
- David Shields 8.75
- John Hack 7.37
- Carl Askew 7.08
- Colin Meredith 6.87
- Pip Lamb 6.39
- James Moore 5.81
- Mick Handley 5.47
- Les Sawyer 3.26

Peterborough

- Dave Gooderham 8.36
- Ian Clark 8.03
- Andy Hines 7.97
- Nigel Flatman 7.48
- Kevin Hawkins 6.67
- Tim Hunt 6.54
- Brian Clark 6.38
- Nigel Couzens 6.07
- Peter Spink 4.74

Rye House

- Ted Hubbard 9.32
- Kelvin Mullarkey 9.11
- Karl Fiala 7.81
- Hugh Saunders 7.74
- Bobby Garrad 7.52
- Ashley Pullen 6.86
- Peter Tarrant 4.85
- Bob Cooper 4.84
- Kevin Smith 4.82

Scunthorpe

- Nicky Allott 9.03
- John McNeill 7.96
- Arthur Browning 6.03
- Phil White 5.63
- Mick Handley 4.29
- Danny Boyle 4.00
- Trevor Whiting 4.00
- Danny Young 3.47
- Paul Cooper 2.77
- John Priest 2.24

Stoke

- Tony Lomas 9.07
- Ian Gledhill 7.45
- John Harrhy 6.98
- Stuart Mountford 6.93
- Ian Robertson 6.89
- Tim Nunan 6.20
- Frank Smith 6.05
- Ian Jeffcoate 4.20

Teesside

- Steve Wilcock 7.94
- Nigel Close 7.39
- Pete Smith 7.23
- Pete Reading 6.13
- Martyn Cusworth 4.75
- Peter Spink 4.46
- Martin Dixon 4.09
- Bob Watts 3.79
- John Robson 3.14
- Dave Gatenby 2.90

Weymouth

- Danny Kennedy 9.16
- Malcolm Shakespeare 7.49
- Sean Willmott 6.96
- Malcolm Corradine 6.76
- Geoff Swindells 6.56
- Gary Ford 5.46
- Mick Conroy 3.77
- Nigel Davis 2.83

Workington

- Arthur Price 8.63
- Brian Havelock 8.39
- Rob Maxfield 7.66
- Ian Hindle 6.40
- Mark Dickinson 5.14
- David Coles 4.82
- Andy Margarson 4.79
- Des Wilson 4.43
- Tony Childs 3.27

== See also ==
- List of United Kingdom Speedway League Champions
- Knockout Cup (speedway)
