= 1972 British League Division Two season =

British motorcycle speedway season

- League: British League Division Two
- No. of competitors: 17
- Champions: Crewe Kings
- Knockout Cup: Crewe Kings
- Individual: Phil Crump
- North Eastern Trophy: Berwick Bandits
- Highest average: Phil Crump
- Division/s above: British League (Div 1)

The 1972 British League Division Two season was the second tier of motorcycle speedway in Great Britain.

== Summary ==
The league still consisted of 17 teams with two teams leaving the league and two teams entering. The Rochdale Hornets had disbanded for good at the end of the previous season, whilst Ipswich Witches moved up to the British League. Two newly created teams Ellesmere Port Gunners and Scunthorpe Saints joined the league. The Romford Bombers promotion and team moved to the West Ham Stadium replacing the defunct West Ham Hammers at the stadium but halfway through the season, they moved again to become Barrow Happy Faces as their sponsor at the time was Duckhams Oil - its happy face logo was prominently displayed on the team's race jackets.

Crewe Kings won their first title and completed the league and cup double. Crewe were led by their Australian Phil Crump who finished top of the league averages and won the Riders' Championship. John Jackson also finished with an impressive average, as did their new signing Australian international Garry Flood. Flood would only ride the one season in speedway and would go on to win eight Australian Motocross Championships.

== Final table ==
Pos	Team	PL	Home					Away					Pts
Pos	Team	PL	W	D	L	F	A	W	D	L	F	A	Pts
1	Crewe Kings	32	15	0	1	834	413	7	1	8	610	628	45
2	Boston Barracudas	32	16	0	0	785	461	5	1	10	580	666	43
3	Peterborough Panthers	32	14	0	2	738	508	7	0	9	574	671	42
4	Rayleigh Rockets	32	15	1	0	771	474	2	3	11	562	686	38
5	Eastbourne Eagles	32	15	1	0	771	469	3	1	12	552	691	38
6	Birmingham Brummies	32	15	1	0	782	462	3	0	13	541	653	37
7	Workington Comets	32	15	0	1	777	468	3	0	13	531	715	36
8	Hull Vikings	32	12	0	4	673	574	4	0	12	550	695	32
9	Barrow Happy Faces	32	13	0	3	712	532	2	1	13	548	698	31
10	Teesside Teessiders	32	14	1	1	728	516	0	2	14	490	754	31
11	Bradford Northern	32	13	0	3	710	530	2	0	14	517	729	30
12	Sunderland Stars	32	13	1	2	702	541	0	1	15	478	765	28
13	Canterbury Crusaders	32	11	0	5	717	526	2	1	13	512	734	27
14	Berwick Bandits	32	11	3	2	671	575	1	0	15	485	755	27
15	Ellesmere Port Gunners	32	11	0	5	667	575	1	0	15	489	754	24
16	Long Eaton Rangers	32	10	2	4	655	589	1	0	15	449	796	24
17	Scunthorpe Saints	32	5	1	10	580	663	0	0	16	402	841	11

== Fixtures and results ==
Home \ Away	BAR	BER	BIR	BOS	BRA	CAN	CK	EAS	EP	HV	LE	PET	RAY	SCU	SUN	TEE	WOR
Barrow/Romford/WH		46–32	43–35	43–35	48–29	42–36	44–33	45–32	55–23	38–40	53–25	37–41	43–35	43–34	45–33	51–27	36–42
Berwick	42–36		31–46	45–33	49–29	39–39	39–39	40–37	42–36	40–38	55–23	37–41	39–39	40–38	46–32	46–32	41–37
Birmingham	42–36	48–29		39–39	51–27	48–30	43–35	48–30	52–26	44–34	62–15	57–21	43–35	57–20	54–24	45–32	49–29
Boston	55–23	54–24	46–32		53–25	55–23	47–31	43–35	44–33	45–33	46–32	51–27	42–36	51–26	50–28	55–23	48–30
Bradford	42–36	46–31	36–41	43–35		52–26	34–40	38–40	44–34	44–34	48–30	42–35	42–36	56–22	58–20	43–34	42–36
Canterbury	48–30	51–26	34–44	46–32	44–34		36–40	40–38	44–34	35–43	50–27	37–41	36–42	63–15	45–32	49–29	59–19
Crewe	51–27	45–33	61–17	54–24	49–29	58–19		59–19	44–34	51–27	56–22	37–41	58–20	61–17	50–28	51–27	49–29
Eastbourne	46–32	51–26	40–36	47–31	58–20	46–32	41–37		56–21	53–24	42–36	48–30	39–39	55–22	55–23	43–34	51–26
Ellesmere Port	41–37	39–36	46–32	31–46	45–33	38–40	38–40	36–42		38–40	45–32	42–36	40–38	54–24	46–31	47–31	41–37
Hull	48–30	50–28	43–35	29–49	36–42	41–37	41–36	40–38	44–34		50–28	35–43	44–34	48–30	40–38	46–32	38–40
Long Eaton	34–43	44–33	39–38	38–40	41–37	43–35	31–47	43–35	44–34	45–33		35–43	39–39	45–33	51–26	39–39	44–34
Peterborough	43–35	43–35	49–29	37–41	46–32	44–34	45–33	52–25	52–26	51–27	48–30		37–41	49–29	46–31	47–31	49–29
Rayleigh	50–28	57–21	51–27	49–28	46–32	47–30	40–38	39–39	51–27	41–36	52–26	45–33		59–19	40–38	53–25	51–27
Scunthorpe	32–46	35–43	43–35	28–50	35–43	34–44	30–48	39.5–37.5	31–46	32–46	36–42	39–38	42–36		39–39	49–28	36–42
Sunderland	42–35	42–36	41–36	43–35	44–34	44–34	34–43	36–42	49–28	47–30	51–27	48–30	43–35	57–21		39–39	42–36
Teesside	39–39	49–29	42–36	44–34	40–38	45–33	37–40	46–32	55–22	47–31	51–27	47–31	48–30	52–26	47–30		39–38
Workington	43–35	55–23	50–28	50–28	44–33	58–20	48–30	47–31	47–31	44–34	51–27	34–43	51–27	51–26	53–25	51–27	

Legend: Blue = home team win; Yellow = draw; Red = away team win.

== Top five riders (league averages) ==
	Rider	Nat	Team	C.M.A.
1	Phil Crump	(Australia)	Crewe	11.10
2	Geoff Maloney	(England)	Rayleigh	10.53
3	Richard Greer	(England)	Peterborough	9.98
4	John Harrhy	(England)	Peterborough	9.93
5	John Jackson	(England)	Crewe	9.91

== British League Division Two Knockout Cup ==
The 1972 British League Division Two Knockout Cup (sponsored by the Speedway Express) was the fifth edition of the Knockout Cup for tier two teams. Crewe Kings were the winners of the competition.

First round

Date	Team one	Score	Team two
01/05	Crewe	49-29	Ellesmere Port
02/05	Ellesmere Port	33-45	Crewe

Second round

Date	Team one	Score	Team two
05/06	Crewe	59-19	Scunthorpe
04/06	Scunthorpe	19-59	Crewe
04/06	Sunderland	55-23	Workington
09/06	Workington	46-31	Sunderland
25/06	Eastbourne	50-28	Long Eaton
08/06	Long Eaton	38-40	Eastbourne
04/06	Boston	46-32	Rayleigh
17/06	Rayleigh	43-35	Boston
09/06	Peterborough	52-26	Barrow
13/06	Barrow	36-42	Peterborough
07/06	Bradford	52-26	Berwick
10/06	Berwick	39-38	Bradford
05/06	Birmingham	43-35	Canterbury
10/06	Canterbury	41-37	Birmingham
08/06	Teesside	48-30	Hull
07/06	Hull	40-38	Teesside

Quarter-finals

Date	Team one	Score	Team two
03/07	Crewe	53-25	Sunderland
03/07	Sunderland	42-36	Crewe
09/07	Eastbourne	45-33	Boston
02/07	Boston	40-38	Eastbourne
07/07	Peterborough	36-14	Bradford
05/07	Bradford	45-33	Peterborough
03/07	Birmingham	48-30	Teesside
06/07	Teesside	41-37	Birmingham

Semi-finals

Date	Team one	Score	Team two
31/07	Crewe	47-31	Eastbourne
30/07	Eastbourne	44-34	Crewe
04/08	Peterborough	43-35	Birmingham
14/08	Birmingham	42-36	Peterborough

=== Final ===
First leg

4 September 1972

Crewe Kings John Jackson 12 Garry Flood 10 Phil Crump 9 Dave Parry 7 Dai Evans 6 Garry Moore 4 Peter Nicholas 3	51 – 27	Peterborough Panthers Roy Carter 11 Brian Clark 6 John Davis 4 John Amies 3 David Ashby 1 Ted Howgego 1 Frank Smith 1 Richard Greer R/R

British Railways Sports Ground

Second leg

10 September 1972

Peterborough Panthers Richard Greer 11 Roy Carter 10 Brian Clark 6 John Davis 5 Ted Howgego 4 David Ashby 3 John Amies 1	40 – 38	Crewe Kings Phil Crump 12 John Jackson 10 Garry Flood 8 Garry Moore 6 Dai Evans 2 Dave Parry 0 Peter Nicholas 0

East of England Showground

Crewe were declared Knockout Cup Champions, winning on aggregate 89–67.

== Leading final averages ==
	Rider	Nat	Team	C.M.A.
1	Phil Crump	(Australia)	Crewe	11.13
2	Geoff Maloney	(England)	Rayleigh	10.34
=3	Richard Greer	(England)	Peterborough	10.03
=3	John Jackson	(England)	Crewe	10.03
5	Malcolm Ballard	(England)	Eastbourne	9.94

== Riders' Championship ==
Phil Crump won the Rider's Championship, held at Wimbledon Stadium on 14 October.

Pos.	Rider	Pts	Total
1	(Australia) Phil Crump	r 3 3 3 3	12+3
2	(England) Arthur Price	3 2 3 2 2	12+2
3	(England) Bob Coles	3 3 1 1 3	11+3
4	(Scotland) Ross Gilbertson	3 3 2 3 fex	11+disq
5	(England) Roger Mills	1 2 2 3 2	10
6	(England) Malcolm Ballard	f 0 3 3 3	9
7	(Australia) Bob Young	1 1 2 2	9
8	(Scotland) Doug Templeton	2 1 2 2 1	8
9	(England) George Major	1 0 3 2 2	8
10	(England) Dave Baugh	2 1 ex 1 3	7
11	(England) Paul Tyrer	2 3 ex ex 0	5
12	(Wales) Taffy Owen	1 0 2 0 1	4
13	(England) Dave Durham	1 1 0 1 1	4
14	(England) Richard Greer	0 2 1 0 1	4
15	(England) Russ Dent	2 0 0 1 0	3
16	(England) Tony Childs	0 2 0 0 0	2
17	(England) John Jackson (res)	1	0
18	(England) Ray Watkins (res)	0 0	0

- f=fell, r-retired, ex=excluded, ef=engine failure

== North Eastern Trophy ==
		M	W	D	L	Pts
1	Berwick	6	4	1	1	9
2	Teesside	6	3	1	2	7
3	Hull	6	2	1	3	5
4	Sunderland	6	0	3	3	3

Home \ Away	BER	HUL	SUN	TEE
Berwick		48–30	46–31	48–30
Hull	33–44		46–31	49–29
Sunderland	39–39	39–39		39–39
Teesside	43–35	50–28	44–33	

Legend: Blue = home team win; Yellow = draw; Red = away team win.

== Riders' final averages ==
Barrow

- Bob Coles 8.61
- Mike Sampson 8.35
- Mike Watkin 6.75
- Tom Owen 5.36
- Ian Hindle 4.95
- Chris Roynon 4.57
- Bobby Campbell 4.36
- Keith Evans 4.33
- Alan Mackie 3.69

Berwick

- Jimmy Gallacher 8.35
- Andy Meldrum 8.35
- Doug Templeton 8.31
- Willie Templeton 7.27
- Jim Beaton 6.34
- Graham Jones 4.26
- George Beaton 4.00
- Geoff Davies 3.87
- Dennis Jackson 3.07
- Alistair Brady 2.53

Birmingham

- Pete Bailey 9.57
- Arthur Browning 9.42
- George Major 7.87
- Terry Shearer 7.55
- Mick Hines 7.34
- Malcolm Corradine 6.00
- Mike Lanham 5.94
- Cliff Emms 5.83
- Archie Wilkinson 5.00
- Mike Gardner 4.32
- Steve Wilson 3.84

Boston

- Arthur Price 9.10
- Jim Ryman 8.58
- Russ Osborne 7.72
- Carl Glover 7.38
- Tony Featherstone 6.38
- Ray Bales 6.27
- Vic Cross 5.87
- Jack Bywater 5.23

Bradford

- Dave Baugh 8.69
- Alan Knapkin 8.11
- Robin Adlington 7.89
- Colin Meredith 5.92
- Alf Wells 5.92
- Alan Bridget 5.82
- Barry Meeks 4.81
- Sid Sheldrick 4.73
- Mick Fielding 3.88
- Mick Fairbairn 3.54

Canterbury

- Ross Gilbertson 9.46
- Graham Banks 7.62
- Ted Hubbard 7.26
- Dave Piddock 7.03
- Bob Hughes 6.46
- Barney Kennett 6.25
- Les Rumsey 4.87
- Trevor Jones 4.31
- Charlie Benham 3.49
- Mike Vernam 3.33
- Gary Cottham Sr. 3.20

Crewe

- Phil Crump 11.13
- John Jackson 10.03
- Garry Flood 8.40
- Dai Evans 7.12
- Dave Morton 6.60
- Dave Parry 5.76
- Peter Nicholas 5.00
- Garry Moore 4.56

Eastbourne

- Malcolm Ballard 9.94
- Gordon Kennett 8.68
- Bobby McNeil 7.84
- Roger Johns 7.24
- Reg Trott 5.60
- Trevor Geer 5.51
- Derek Cook 5.42
- Paul Gachet 5.14
- Simon Bruce 3.91

Ellesmere Port

- Paul Tyrer 8.47
- Graham Drury 6.56
- Colin Goad 6.42
- Robbie Gardner 6.40
- Cyril Francis 5.65
- Ian Gills 5.41
- Chris Blythe 4.50
- Paul Callaghan 4.45
- Geoff Pusey 1.90

Hull

- Tony Childs 9.03
- Dave Mills 8.59
- Robin Amundson 7.73
- Stan Stevens 6.76
- Dennis Gavros 5.71
- Bryan Loakes 5.40
- Pete Boston 4.95
- Clark Facey 4.54
- Dennis Wasden 4.31
- Colin Tucker 4.15
- Bernie Hornby 1.82

Long Eaton

- Geoff Bouchard 8.06
- Roger Mills 7.95
- Joe Hughes 6.29
- Steve Bass 5.77
- Chris Harrison 4.42
- Peter Jarvis 4.05
- Cliff Emms 3.40
- Phil Whittaker 3.39
- Gil Farmer 3.06
- Ian Champion 2.67
- Brian Woodhouse 1.56

Peterborough

- Richard Greer 10.03
- John Harrhy 9.93 (7 matches only)
- John Davis 8.13
- Roy Carter 8.12
- Clive Noy 6.63
- Ted Howgego 6.57
- Alan Witt 5.09
- Brian Clark 5.05
- Pete Saunders 5.04
- Frank Smith 4.67
- John Amies 4.12
- David Ashby 3.89

Rayleigh

- Geoff Maloney 10.34
- Bob Young 8.74
- Brian Foote 8.67
- Allan Emmett 8.21
- Trevor Barnwell 6.22
- Dingle Brown 6.12
- Dave "Tiger" Beech 5.90
- Nigel Rackett 5.12
- Ivan Miller 5.04
- Peter Claridge 4.38
- Terry Stone 3.79

Scunthorpe

- Brian Maxted 6.36
- Terry Kelly 6.00
- Ray Watkins 5.80
- Phil Bass 5.78
- Doug Underwood 5.08
- Ian Wilson 5.00
- Rod Haynes 4.79
- Brian Osborn 4.07
- Alan Bellham 3.70
- John Bowerman 3.67
- Peter Taylor 2.82

Sunderland

- Jack Millen 8.69
- Graeme Smith 8.29
- Russ Dent 7.25
- George Barclay 6.88
- Dave Gatenby 5.27
- Peter Wrathall 4.16
- Jim Wells 3.81

Teesside

- Roger Wright 8.56
- Dave Durham 7.90
- Bruce Forrester 7.35
- Frank Auffret 6.93
- Pete Reading 6.54
- Tim Swales 5.97
- Mick Moore 5.79
- Tony Swales 4.32
- Maxwell Clift .3.00

Workington

- Taffy Owen 8.8
- Lou Sansom 8.53
- Malcolm MacKay 8.47
- Mitch Graham 6.43
- Kym Amundson 5.89
- Steve Watson 5.13
- Dave Kumeta 4.04
- Darryl Stobbart 4.00
- Lindsay Davies 3.71

== See also ==
- List of United Kingdom Speedway League Champions
- Knockout Cup (speedway)
