= Branney =

Branney is a surname. Notable people with the surname include:

- Craig Branney (born 1982), English motorcycle speedway rider
- John Branney (born 1985), English motorcycle speedway rider, brother of Craig
