= British League Division Two Pairs Championship =

Speedway competition

- Sport: Speedway
- Founded: 1975
- Folded: 1994
- Country: United Kingdom

Notes
- replaced by the Premier League Pairs Championship

The British League Division Two Pairs Championship, named the National League Pairs Championship in the years that the second division was known as the National League was a motorcycle speedway contest between the top two riders from each club competing in the British League Division Two/New National League/National League in the United Kingdom.

== Winners ==
Year	Winners	Runners-up
National League Pairs
1975	Newcastle Diamonds (Tom Owen & Brian Havelock)	Ellesmere Port Gunners (John Jackson & Colin Goad)
1976	Ellesmere Port Gunners (John Jackson & Chris Turner)	Newcastle Diamonds (Tom Owen & Joe Owen)
1977	Boston Barracudas (Rob Hollingworth & Colin Cook)	Newport Dragons (Jim Brett & Brian Woodward)
1978	Ellesmere Port Gunners (John Jackson & Steve Finch)	Newcastle Diamonds (Tom Owen & Robbie Blackadder)
1979	Milton Keynes Knights (Andy Grahame & Bob Humphreys)	Ellesmere Port Gunners (John Jackson & Steve Finch)
1980	Middlesbrough Tigers (Mark Courtney & Steve Wilcock)	Boston Barracudas (Rob Hollingworth & Gary Guglielmi)
1981	Canterbury Crusaders (Mike Ferreira & Denzil Kent)	Berwick Bandits (Wayne Brown & Steve McDermott)
1982	Weymouth Wildcats (Martin Yeates & Simon Wigg)	Long Eaton Invaders (Alan Molyneux & Dave Perks)
1983	Weymouth Wildcats (Martin Yeates & Simon Cross)	Glasgow Tigers (Jim McMillan & Steve Lawson)
1984	Stoke Potters (Nigel Crabtree & Tom Owen)	Berwick Bandits (Bruce Cribb & Steve McDermott)
1985	Ellesmere Port Gunners (Joe Owen & Louis Carr)	Poole Pirates (Martin Yeates & Stan Bear)
1986	Edinburgh Monarchs (Les Collins & Doug Wyer)	Hackney Kestrels (Barry Thomas & Andy Galvin)
1987	Mildenhall Fen Tigers (Dave Jessup & Melvyn Taylor)	Peterborough Panthers (Ian Barney & Kevin Hawkins)
1988	Stoke Potters (Graham Jones & Steve Bastable)	Poole Pirates (Steve Schofield & David Biles)
1989	Stoke Potters (Nigel Crabtree & Eric Monaghan)	Mildenhall Fen Tigers (Preben Eriksen & Peter Glanz)
1990	Hackney Kestrels (Steve Schofield & Andy Galvin)	Exeter Falcons (Steve Regeling & Peter Jeffrey)
1991 to 1993 competition not held
British League Division Two Pairs
1994	Swindon Robins (Tony Olsson & Tony Langdon)	Glasgow Tigers (Nigel Crabtree & David Walsh)

== See also ==
- List of United Kingdom Speedway Pairs champions
- Speedway in the United Kingdom
- Elite League Pairs Championship
