= 1985 National League season =

British speedway season

- League: National League
- No. of competitors: 19
- Champions: Ellesmere Port Gunners
- Knockout Cup: Eastbourne Eagles
- Individual: Neil Middleditch
- Pairs: Ellesmere Port Gunners
- Fours: Middlesbrough Tigers
- London Cup: Wimbledon Dons
- Highest average: Gordon Kennett
- Division/s above: 1985 British League

The 1985 National League was contested as the second division of motorcycle speedway in the United Kingdom.

== Team changes ==
A new team called the Barrow Blackhawks entered the league but only staged a handful of fixtures. The team failed to meet the minimum points limit resulting in the league authorities stopping their participation. Scunthorpe Stags withdrew from the league in May.

Weymouth Wildcats promoters Peter Ansell and Mervyn Stewkesbury, moved their team to Poole for the start of the 1985 season, following the closure of the Poole Pirates due to financial debts. The team raced as the Poole Wildcats.

Boston Barracudas promoter Cyril Crane withdrew the team from the league just days before the start of the season when Crane relinquished his interests.

Wimbledon Dons, Eastbourne Eagles and Exeter Falcons all dropped down from the British League to join the National League. Ellesmere Port Gunners and Birmingham Brummies made their returns to British Speedway in the National League.

== Summary ==
The league title became a dramatic three horse race between Poole Wildcats, Middlesbrough Tigers and Ellesmere Port Gunners. All three teams entered October with only away matches left. Poole were two points ahead of Middlesbrough but had one meeting left, with Middlesbrough having two matches in hand. Ellesmere Port were two points behind Middlesbrough but had four meetings left. The Gunners won away at strugglers Long Eaton and Edinburgh to draw level with Poole, and Middlesbrough won at Stoke to leave all three level. Ellesmere Port drew their penultimate fixture at Peterborough who had previously won every home match whilst Poole lost heavily at Berwick to rule them out of the running. Then tragedy struck Ellesmere Port at Birmingham, having lost the KO Cup final only two days previous. With Middlesbrough losing at Eastbourne on the same night, a victory would have given the Thornton Road outfit the title. Leading by 6 points after 8 heats, top scorer Joe Owen crashed and suffered a severe back injury which was to leave him paralysed. The subsequent 0-5 and loss of their best rider saw Birmingham fight back to win leaving Middlesbrough needing a win at Glasgow to snatch the title. It wasn't until November in the last meeting of the year that the showdown took place. Glasgow were second bottom due to their dreadful away record, but were not a bad outfit at home and kept the scores level after 10 heats. Disaster struck for the away side as Steve Wilcock crashed out and Glasgow took the 5-1. Trailing by four points going into the last heat, Martin Dixon bit the dust and the title was lost. Ellesmere Port Gunners were champions.

Barrow Blackhawks and Scunthorpe Stags withdrew in May and had their results expunged. Ellesmere Port Gunners closed after the fateful night in Birmingham, never to return.

== Final table ==
Pos	Team	PL	W	D	L	Pts
1	Ellesmere Port Gunners	36	25	2	9	52
2	Poole Wildcats	36	25	1	10	51
3	Middlesbrough Tigers	36	25	1	10	51
4	Wimbledon Dons	36	23	1	12	47
5	Hackney Kestrels	36	22	0	14	44
6	Arena Essex Hammers	36	20	2	14	42
7	Peterborough Panthers	36	19	2	15	40
8	Stoke Potters	36	20	0	16	40
9	Berwick Bandits	36	19	1	16	39
10	Eastbourne Eagles	36	18	2	16	38
11	Milton Keynes Knights	36	16	1	19	33
12	Exeter Falcons	36	16	0	20	32
13	Rye House Rockets	36	15	0	21	30
14	Birmingham Brummies	36	14	1	21	29
15	Mildenhall Fen Tigers	36	14	0	22	28
16	Canterbury Crusaders	36	14	0	22	28
17	Glasgow Tigers	36	10	2	24	22
18	Long Eaton Invaders	36	9	2	25	20
19	Edinburgh Monarchs	36	9	0	27	18

== Fixtures and results ==
Home \ Away	AE	BER	BIR	CAN	EAS	ED	EP	EX	GLA	HAC	LE	MID	MIL	MK	PET	PP	RH	STO	WIM
Arena Essex		40–38	44–34	38–40	41–37	52–26	40–38	48–29	55–23	44–34	53–25	38–39	46–32	40–37	54–24	43–35	44–34	44–33	42–35
Berwick	55–23		50–28	49–28	38–39	53–25	38–40	56–22	53–24	41–37	44–34	39–39	46–32	49–29	55–23	53–24	57–21	43–34	50–28
Birmingham	46–32	52–26		43–35	39–39	40–38	41–36	47–31	49–29	36–38	37–40	35–43	46–32	44–34	34–43	44–34	44–33	38–40	38–39
Canterbury	36–41	33–45	37–41		43–35	49–29	34–44	42–36	52–26	44–34	54–24	32–46	40–38	43–35	53–25	36–42	51–27	37–41	42–36
Eastbourne	42–36	47–31	41–37	43–35		58–20	39–39	52–26	50–28	44–34	43–35	47–31	46–31	43–35	41–37	42–35	38–40	41–37	37–41
Edinburgh	35–43	37–41	52–26	40–38	36–41		36–41	50–28	48–29	30–45	37–41	37–41	42–36	37–41	46–31	37–41	43–34	50–27	37–41
Ellesmere Port	54–24	34–41	58–20	55–22	50–28	52–26		43–35	54–24	41–37	52–26	48–29	43–35	54–24	46–32	45–33	56–22	44–34	53–25
Exeter	49–29	57–21	37–41	43–35	42–35	48–30	49–29		56–22	50–28	50–28	48–30	51–27	58–20	55–23	38–40	48–30	59–19	51–27
Glasgow	39–39	32–46	35–43	50–28	38–39	42–36	37–38	46–32		47–31	48–30	41–37	35–43	46–32	41–37	46–32	49–28	38–39	39–39
Hackney	45–33	50–27	56–22	54–24	50–28	58–20	39–38	43–35	62–16		57–1	48–29	55–23	55–23	53–25	37–41	49–29	44–34	44–34
Long Eaton	39–39	52–26	41–36	37–41	43–35	38–40	36–42	44–34	56–22	37–40		38–39	48–30	39–39	46–32	27–51	33–44	37–40	35–43
Middlesbrough	41–37	40–38	46–32	57–21	45–33	50–28	40–38	52–26	54–24	50–28	52–26		43–34	46–30	47–31	45–33	49–29	51–27	41–37
Mildenhall	38–40	51–27	40–38	42–36	45–33	53–25	34–44	53–25	51–27	44–34	52–26	49–28		41–37	36–41	32–45	47–31	35–3	35–43
Milton Keynes	39–38	46–32	41–37	41–36	39–37	45–33	35–43	47–31	51–27	37–41	47–31	47–31	49–29		44–34	40–37	42–36	42–36	30.5–47.5
Peterborough	50–28	48–30	65–0	42–35	43–35	50–28	39–39	40–38	55–23	49–28	52–26	44–34	65–0	41–37		44–34	54–24	42–36	40–38
Poole Wildcats	49–29	45–32	50–27	51–27	51–27	56–22	40–38	53–25	53–25	43–35	56–22	40–38	51–27	57–21	39–39		55–23	55–23	56–22
Rye House	43–35	42–36	49–29	32–36	39–37	57–21	43–35	57–21	54–24	23–54	47–30	36–41	38–40	51–26	41–36	38–40		51–25	40–37
Stoke	37–41	43–35	48–30	51–26	40–38	45–33	36–41	51–27	47–31	44–34	46–32	37–40	42–36	43–35	39–21	40–38	45–33		46–32
Wimbledon	51–27	44–33	43–35	52–26	44–34	52–26	44–34	47–31	63–15	45–33	48–29	40–37	55–23	47–31	52–26	37–41	47–31	41–37	

Legend: Blue = home team win; Yellow = draw; Red = away team win.

== Top five riders (league averages) ==
	Rider	Nat	Team	C.M.A.
1	Gordon Kennett	(England)	Eastbourne	10.46
2	Joe Owen	(England)	Ellesmere Port	10.46
3	Mike Ferreira	(Zimbabwe)	Wimbledon	10.03
4	Stan Bear	(Australia)	Poole	9.89
5	Carl Blackbird	(England)	Mildenhall	9.82

== National League Knockout Cup ==
The 1985 National League Knockout Cup was the 18th edition of the Knockout Cup for tier two teams. Eastbourne Eagles were the winners of the competition.

First round

Date	Team one	Score	Team two
24/04	Wimbledon	62-16	Poole
23/04	Poole	38-40	Wimbledon
06/05	Canterbury	45-33	Eastbourne
03/05	Peterborough	45-33	Arena Essex
28/04	Eastbourne	47-31	Canterbury
26/04	Edinburgh	38.5-38.5	Ellesmere Port
25/04	Ellesmere Port	43-35	Edinburgh
23/04	Barrow	18-24a	Exeter
22/04	Exeter	58-20	Barrow
21/04	Birmingham	50-28	Glasgow
19/04	Glasgow	42-36	Birmingham
18/04	Arena Essex	55-23	Peterborough

a=Abandoned (power failure, result stood)

Second round

Date	Team one	Score	Team two
26/06	Wimbledon	43-35	Arena Essex
24/06	Exeter	50.5-27.5	Berwick
20/06	Arena Essex	40-38	Wimbledon
08/06	Berwick	57-21	Exeter
26/05	Eastbourne	50-28	Milton Keynes
21/05	Milton Keynes	36-42	Eastbourne
06/05	Birmingham	38-39	Ellesmere Port
05/05	Mildenhall	42-35	Hackney
04/05	Stoke	33-45	Middlesbrough
03/05	Hackney	44-34	Mildenhall
02/05	Middlesbrough	48-30	Stoke

Quarter-finals

Date	Team one	Score	Team two
18/08	Berwick	33-45	Ellesmere Port
16/08	Ellesmere Port	56-22	Berwick
11/08	Eastbourne	44-33	Wimbledon
07/08	Wimbledon	39-39	Eastbourne
14/07	Middlesbrough	45-33	Rye House
12/07	Hackney	47-31	Long Eaton
05/06	Long Eaton	33-45	Hackney
02/06	Rye House	37-41	Middlesbrough

Semi-finals

Date	Team one	Score	Team two
27/09	Hackney	49-29	Ellesmere Port
26/09	Ellesmere Port	50-28	Hackney
12/09	Middlesbrough	48-30	Eastbourne
25/08	Eastbourne	49-29	Middlesbrough

=== Final ===
First leg

13 October 1985

Eastbourne Eagles Gordon Kennett 10 Colin Richardson 10 Martin Dugard 8 Andy Buck 7 Paul Clarke 6 Chris Mulvihill 4 Keith Pritchard 1	46 – 32	Ellesmere Port Gunners Joe Owen 9 Louis Carr 9 Dave Morton 8 David Walsh 4 Miles Evans 1 Phil Alderman 1 Richie Owen 0

Arlington Stadium

Second leg

18 October 1985

Ellesmere Port Gunners Louis Carr 13 Joe Owen 9 Dave Morton 9 David Walsh 4 Gary O'Hare 2 Phil Alderman 2 Richie Owen 2	41 – 37	Eastbourne Eagles Gordon Kennett 12 Andy Buck 9 Colin Richardson 7 Martin Dugard 4 Paul Clarke 2 Chris Mulvihill 2 Keith Pritchard 1

Ellesmere Port Stadium

Eastbourne were declared Knockout Cup Champions, winning on aggregate 83–73.

== Riders' Championship ==
Neil Middleditch won the Riders' Championship. The final was held on 10 August at Brandon Stadium.

Pos.	Rider	Pts	Total
1	(England) Neil Middleditch	3 3 2 3 3	14
2	(England) Kevin Hawkins	2 3 2 3 3	13
3	(England) Trevor Banks	3 2 3 2 2	12
4	(Australia) Stan Bear	3 fx 2 2 3	10
5	(England) Doug Wyer	3 3 0 0 3	9
6	(England) Gordon Kennett	2 3 3 ef 0	8
7	(England) Dave Mullett	0 1 3 2 2	8
8	(England) Nigel De'ath	0 2 0 3 2	7
9	(England) Louis Carr	2 ex 1 3 1	7
10	(England) Dave Perks	1 1 3 0 1	6
11	(England) Steve McDermott	2 2 0 1 0	5
12	(Zimbabwe) Mike Ferreira	0 0 1 2 2	5
13	(England) Carl Baldwin	1 0 2 1 1	5
14	(England) Tom Owen	1 1 1 1 1	5
15	(England) Steve Lawson	1 2 0 1 t	4
16	(England) Steve Wilcock	0 1 1 0 0	2
17	(England) Mike Bacon (res)	0	0

- f=fell, r-retired, ex=excluded, ef=engine failure

== Pairs ==
The National League Pairs was held at Hackney Wick Stadium on 15 September and was won by Ellesmere Port Gunners.

Pos	Team	Pts	Riders
1	Wimbledon	20	Ferreira 11, Johns 9
2	Ellesmere P	20	Carr L 11, Owen J 9
3	Poole	18	Yeates 12, Bear 6
4	Peterborough	15	Hawkins 11, Poole 4
5	Middlesbrough	15	Dixon 9, Wilcock 6
6	Hackney	15	Galvin 10, Banks 5
7	Rye House	14	Silver 8, Stevens 6
8	Arena Essex	13	Middleditch 11, Cheshire 2

Pos	Team	Pts	Riders
9	Canterbury	13	Mullett 10, Tilbury 3
10	Exeter	12	Cook 10, Maxfield 2
11	Mildenhall	11	Taylor 8, Baldwin 3
12	Stoke	10	Thorp 8, Owen T 2
13	Berwick	10	McDermott 8, McMillan 2
14	Birmingham	9	Wyer 9, White P 0
15	Eastbourne	9	Kennett 9, Richardson 0
16	Milton Keynes	8	White K 8, De'ath 0

Semi finals

- Poole bt Wimbledon
- Ellesmere Port bt Peterborough

Final

- Ellesmere Port bt Poole

== Fours ==
Middlesbrough Tigers won the fours championship final, held at the East of England Arena on 21 July.

Semi finals

- SF1 = Hackney 18, Stoke 12, Berwick 10, Wimbledon 8
- SF2 = Middlesbrough 17, Peterborough 12, Poole 11, Arena Essex 8

Final

Pos	Team	Pts	Riders
1	Middlesbrough Tigers	17	Havelock 7, Fiora, Pusey, Wilcock, Dixon
2	Peterborough Panthers	12	Barney 8
3	Hackney Kestrels	10	Banks 5
4	Stoke Potters	9	Crabtree 5, Thorp 2, Owen 1, Wilding 0, Sumner 0

== Leading averages ==
Rider	Team	Average
Gordon Kennett	Eastbourne	10.47
Joe Owen	Ellesmere Port	10.47
Mike Ferreira	Wimbledon	9.82
Stan Bear	Poole	9.79
Carl Blackbird	Mildenhall	9.64
Roger Johns	Wimbledon	9.64
Neil Middleditch	Arena Essex	9.47
Steve Lawson	Glasgow	9.39
Louis Carr	Ellesmere Port	9.37
Kevin Smith	Poole	9.32

== London Cup ==
Wimbledon won the London Cup but the competition consisted of just Wimbledon and Hackney. It was also the first time that the competition had been competed for by second tier teams.

Results

Team	Score	Team
Hackney	42–35	Wimbledon
Wimbledon	43–35	Hackney

== Riders & final averages ==
Arena Essex

- Neil Middleditch 9.47
- Martin Goodwin 7.42
- Bob Humphreys 6.96
- David Cheshire 6.90
- David Smart 6.29
- Alan Sage 5.63
- Gary Chessell 4.77
- Ian Humphreys 2.44
- Sean Barker 2.12

Barrow (withrew from the league)

- Paul Price 4.40
- Kevin Armitage 4.00
- Gary O'Hare 3.76
- Eric Broadbelt 3.37
- Terry Kelly 1.87
- Bob Coles 1.71
- Gary Clegg 1.33
- Wayne Jackson 1.00

Berwick

- Jimmy McMillan 8.24
- Steve McDermott 7.70
- Bruce Cribb 7.56
- Charlie McKinna 7.56
- Rob Grant Sr. 7.06
- Sean Courtney 5.87
- Phil Kynman 5.27
- Jacko Irving 4.00

Birmingham

- Doug Wyer 8.57
- Reg Wilson 7.50
- Phil White 7.39
- Paul Evitts 6.03
- Paul Stead 5.90
- Linden Warner 4.50
- Mark Stevenson 4.43
- Ian M Stead 3.45
- Julian Parr 2.80

Canterbury

- Dave Mullett 8.78
- Mike Spink 7.97
- Rob Tilbury 6.44
- Neville Tatum 5.72
- Bill Barrett 5.64
- Steve Bryenton 5.16
- Lawrie Bloomfield 4.26
- Mark Terry 2.13

Eastbourne

- Gordon Kennett 10.47
- Colin Richardson 8.66
- Andy Buck 7.26
- Martin Dugard 5.69
- Keith Pritchard 5.63
- Paul Clarke 5.49
- Chris Mulvihill 4.38
- Derek Harrison 3.18
- Dean Standing 1.21

Edinburgh

- Brett Saunders 7.46
- Bobby Beaton 7.39
- Steve Finch 7.02
- Dave Trownson 6.13
- Phil Jeffrey 5.70
- Billy Burton 5.04
- Mark Burrows 4.18
- Alan Mason 3.76
- Gordon Whitaker 3.24
- Roger Lambert 2.97
- Scott Lamb 1.92

Ellesmere Port

- Joe Owen 10.47
- Louis Carr 9.37
- Dave Morton 8.03
- David Walsh 6.73
- Gary O'Hare 6.00
- Miles Evans 5.76
- Phil Alderman 5.37
- Richie Owen 4.78

Exeter

- Colin Cook 7.74
- Rob Maxfield 7.74
- Nigel Sparshott 7.39
- Steve Bishop 7.14
- Kevin Price 6.91
- Michael Coles 6.28
- Mike Semmonds 5.30
- Dave Roberts 2.42

Glasgow

- Steve Lawson 9.39
- Martin McKinna 6.60
- Andy Reid 5.99
- Kenny Brailsford 4.50
- David Cassels 4.23
- Jim Beaton 4.21
- Brian Collins 4.05
- Geoff Powell 4.00
- Colin Caffrey 3.65

Hackney

- Trevor Banks 8.19
- Andy Galvin 8.02
- Paul Whittaker 7.76
- Paul Bosley 7.52
- Alan Mogridge 7.32
- Barry Thomas 7.29
- Richard Pettman 4.98

Long Eaton

- Chris Pidcock 8.14
- Dave Perks 8.09
- David Tyler 7.06
- Paul Stead 6.54
- Graham Drury 5.97
- Alan Molyneux 5.91
- Gerald Short 5.85
- Pete Smith 4.78
- John Proctor 4.54
- John Frankland 4.44
- Mark Stevenson 4.00
- Derek Cooper 2.70

Middlesbrough

- Steve Wilcock 9.23
- Martin Dixon 8.93
- Mark Fiora 8.57
- Gary Havelock 7.33
- Jim Burdfield 6.72
- Geoff Pusey 6.04
- Mark Crang 3.83
- Ian Wedgwood 3.02
- Roland Tebbs 1.54

Mildenhall

- Carl Blackbird 9.64
- Melvyn Taylor 7.84
- Carl Baldwin 7.82
- Robert Henry 7.46
- Andy Hines 7.20
- Rob Hollingworth 5.84
- Dave Jackson 5.45
- Richard Green 3.92
- Rob Parish 3.26
- Wally Hill 2.54

Milton Keynes

- Keith White 8.55
- Nigel De'ath 8.48
- David Blackburn 6.28
- Derek Richardson 5.94
- Kevin Smart 5.70
- Mark Chessell .55
- Ashley Pullen 4.00
- Rob Wall 3.58
- Peter McNamara 3.53
- Rob Price 1.94

Peterborough

- Kevin Hawkins 9.12
- Mick Poole 7.52
- Dave Allen 7.27
- Ian Clark 6.73
- Ian Barney 6.00
- Keith Bloxsome 5.92
- Adrian Hume 4.81
- Pete Chapman 2.82

Poole

- Stan Bear 9.79
- Kevin Smith 9.32
- Martin Yeates 8.40
- David Biles 6.39
- Marcus Bisson 6.09
- Guy Wilson 5.98
- Ray Dole 5.96
- Dave Gibbs 3.95

Rye House

- Andrew Silver 8.61
- Alastair Stevens 7.37
- Rob Woffinden 6.84
- Bobby Garrad 6.34
- Kelvin Mullarkey 5.91
- Kevin Brice 4.41
- Neil Cotton 4.33
- Keith Millard 3.11
- Gary Rolls 3.11
- Nigel Leaver 2.10

Scunthorpe

- Andy Buck 9.64
- Rob Woffinden 7.54
- Steve Finch 7.50
- Derek Richardson 5.78
- Julian Parr 4.57
- Mark Burrows 4.40
- Peter McNamara 1.93

Stoke

- Nigel Crabtree 8.69
- Tom Owen 8.36
- Paul Thorp 7.38
- Graham Jones 5.70
- Mike Wilding 5.53
- Ian Stead 5.33
- Daz Sumner 4.82
- Nigel Harrhy 3.45

Wimbledon

- Mike Ferreira 9.82
- Roger Johns 9.64
- Jamie Luckhurst 8.34
- Kevin Teager 6.45
- Peter Johns 5.09
- Jeremy Luckhurst 4.94
- Mark Baldwin 4.73

== See also ==
- List of United Kingdom Speedway League Champions
- Knockout Cup (speedway)
