= Ashby Ville Stadium =

Former stadium in Scunthorpe, England

- Location: Scunthorpe, England
- Coordinates: 53°33′56″N 0°37′03″W
- Owner: North Lincolnshire Council
- Operator: Scunthorpe speedway BriSCA Formula 1 Stock Cars
- Opened: 1979
- Closed: 1993
- Length: 315 m (0.196 mi)

Ashby Ville Stadium was a multi-purpose stadium in Scunthorpe, North Lincolnshire, owned by North Lincolnshire Council and primarily used for motorcycle speedway and stock car racing.

== History ==
During the 1978 National League season, the Scunthorpe Saints speedway team were told to vacate the Quibell Park Stadium by North Lincolnshire Council. Ongoing issues surrounding the track and conflict with the athletics club had led to the speedway promoter Brian Osborn looking for a new home even before being evicted. Osborn brought in fellow promoters Ted Hornsby and Jim Streets to help with the transition.

The search for a new site for the 1979 season ended when the North Lincolnshire Council agreed to the building of a stadium on a seven-acre area of land in the south east of Scunthorpe, near the cooling towers of the steelworks. The area was known as Ashby Ville due to the name of the nearby lake. The construction started in early part of 1979, with floodlights and a portable stand being added in an attempt to get the stadium ready for an Easter opening.

After a successful application to the Speedway Control Board for a licence, the stadium duly opened by Easter, with the first fixture being held on 6 May 1979, featuring a challenge match against Middlesbrough Bears. The speedway team changed their name from the Saints to the Stags to mark the new era.

In January 1985, the now speedway promoter Tony Nicholls secured a 35-year freehold lease and announced optimistic plans to build an auction centre, restaurant and transport cafe and also bring stockcars and BMX racing to Ashby Ville. However, although work started on improving the facilities, Nicholls ran into financial problems and the speedway team was disbanded during May 1985.

Despite the end of speedway at the venue, it still held BriSCA Formula 1 Stock Cars and there were hopes to introduce greyhound racing. The Borough council repossessed the site from Nicholls, who had debts of over £10,000 with them.

The stadium then sat empty for several years and was marked as a possible venue for a new football stadium for Scunthorpe United in 1986 and as a music concert venue in 1988. It also served as a home venue for the Scunthorpe Steelers American Football team in the late 1980s and as a banger racing circuit in the early 1990s.

By 1992, the stadium was earmarked for demolition because plans for a new shopping centre materialised. The Lakeside shopping complex was subsequently constructed and the stadium demolished in 1993.
