= Louis Carr (disambiguation) =

Louis Carr may refer to:

- Louis Carr (entrepreneur) (born 1956), president of BET Media Group
- Louis Carr (speedway rider) (born 1960), speedway rider

== See also ==
- Louis Carré (disambiguation)
