= National League Four-Team Championship =

Speedway competition in Britain

- Sport: Speedway
- Founded: 1976
- Folded: 1994
- Country: United Kingdom

Notes
- replaced by the Premier League Four-Team Championship

The National League Four-Team Championship was a contest between teams competing in the second tier of speedway in the United Kingdom. Teams were grouped into fours, with one rider from each team in each race. The winners and second place of each group compete for the Championship in the final. It was known as the National League Four-Team Championship from 1976 until 1990, and as the British League Division Two Four-Team Championship from 1991 until 1994, reflecting the different names used for the league.

In 1995, a new competition called the Premier League Four-Team Championship replaced this league. However because division 1 and 2 merged for the 1995 and 1996 seasons, the event was run as the only Fours championship. From 1997 it reverted back to an event for tier two teams only.

== Winners ==
Year	Winners	2nd Place	3rd Place	4th Place
1976	Newcastle Diamonds	Eastbourne Eagles	Ellesmere Port Gunners	Workington Comets
1977	Peterborough Panthers	Canterbury Crusaders	Eastbourne Eagles	Stoke Potters
1978	Peterborough Panthers	Stoke Potters	Canterbury Crusaders	Ellesmere Port Gunners
1979	Ellesmere Port Gunners	Mildenhall Fen Tigers	Peterborough Panthers	Berwick Bandits
1980	Crayford Kestrels	Rye House Rockets	Ellesmere Port Gunners	Stoke Potters
1981	Edinburgh Monarchs	Newcastle Diamonds	Middlesbrough Tigers	Wolverhampton Wolves
1982	Newcastle Diamonds	Mildenhall Fen Tigers	Middlesbrough Tigers	Rye House Rockets
1983	Newcastle Diamonds	Mildenhall Fen Tigers	Milton Keynes Knights	Long Eaton Invaders
1984	Mildenhall Fen Tigers	Stoke Potters	Milton Keynes Knights	Boston Barracudas
1985	Middlesbrough Tigers	Peterborough Panthers	Hackney Kestrels	Stoke Potters
1986	Middlesbrough Tigers	Arena Essex Hammers	Hackney Kestrels	Mildenhall Fen Tigers
1987	Mildenhall Fen Tigers	Arena Essex Hammers	Eastbourne Eagles	Wimbledon Dons
1988	Peterborough Panthers	Mildenhall Fen Tigers	Eastbourne Eagles	Poole Pirates
1989	Peterborough Panthers	Stoke Potters	Exeter Falcons	Eastbourne Eagles
1990	Stoke Potters	Poole Pirates	Hackney Kestrels	Ipswich Witches
1991	Arena Essex Hammers	Edinburgh Monarchs	Long Eaton Invaders	Milton Keynes Knights
1992	Peterborough Panthers	Edinburgh Monarchs	Rye House Rockets	Glasgow Tigers
1993	Edinburgh Monarchs	Swindon Robins	Long Eaton Invaders	Rye House Rockets
1994	Oxford Cheetahs	Long Eaton Invaders	Peterborough Panthers	Edinburgh Monarchs

== See also ==
- List of United Kingdom Speedway Fours Champions
- Speedway in the United Kingdom
