= Ellesmere Port Stadium =

Former stadium in Cheshire, England

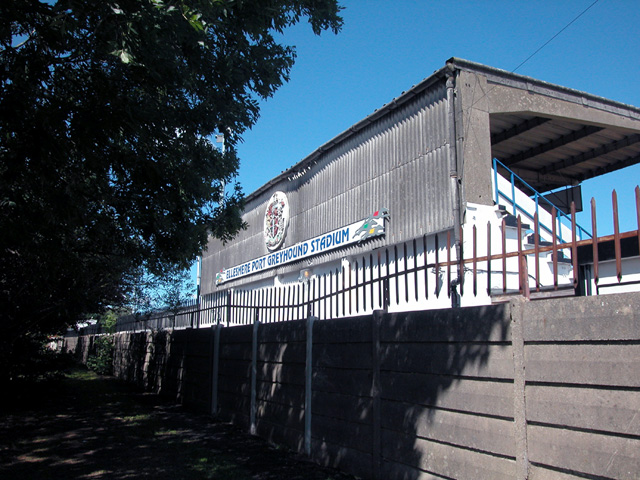
- The stadium in 2005
- Location: Thornton Road, Wirral, Cheshire
- Owner: Ellesmere Port and Neston Borough Council

Construction
- Opened: 1968
- Closed: 2014

Ellesmere Port Stadium was opened initially as a football stadium with speedway and then greyhound racing following. It was located on Thornton Road, Ellesmere Port, in the Wirral, Cheshire, England. It was often referred to as Thornton Road Stadium. The nearby M53 motorway opened in 1975.

== Origins ==
The stadium was constructed to replace Ellesmere Port Town's York Street ground that disappeared as part of a Council funded town centre redevelopment. The 2,000 capacity stadium was owned and built by Ellesmere Port and Neston Borough Council. It was officially opened in September 1968 by former player and at the time Manchester City Manager Joe Mercer, who was born and grew up close to where the stadium was built. Wrexham provided the opposition in a floodlit friendly match before 1,025 people.

== Football ==
The move to the new stadium however coincided with a dramatic fall by the club. Promoted to the Northern Premier League in 1971, increasing financial difficulties led to the club resigning in 1973 and dropping down into the much lower level Lancashire Combination and the Mid-Cheshire League in 1976, folding in 1978.

It is claimed that the popularity of speedway and the move to a stadium located away from the town centre contributed to their demise. York Street attendances averaged 3,000 in the late 1960's but dwindled to less than 200 by 1978.

Further attempts to restore senior football to the town came in the form of Ellesmere Port & Neston (1981-1989) and a new Ellesmere Port Town (1992-1994) both of whom had spells in the North West Counties League based at the stadium. After this local teams would occasionally use the ground and also important cup games were played required.

== Speedway ==
The Ellesmere Port Gunners opened the speedway track on March 28th 1972, with Ian Turner, the British Speedway Under 21 Championship officiating followed by a 39-39 draw with Sunderland. Racing took place at under the promotion of Wally Mawdsley, of Canterbury, Bristol and Arena -Essex fame.

They were resident from 1972 until 1982, and again in 1985. In 1983 the Gunners dropped out of the league despite reaching the previous season's Knock Out Cup Final and assurances by promoter Richard Park that the team would continue racing at Thornton Road amidst rising costs.

The club was resurrected for one season in 1985 and went on to win the title during the 1985 National League season. and were runners up in the Knockout Cup. The track record was set twice on the same night during the Knock-Out Cup Final 1st-leg. The Gunners Louis Carr recording a time of 69.1 seconds. Unsustainable losses however were incurred and the Gunners did not return in 1986. The final Speedway meeting a took place on Boxing Day 1985 when a 39 all draw suited both parties in the Past and Present team match.

== Greyhound Racing ==
Greyhound racing started at 7-30pm on 29 February 1988 on the converted speedway track. It was seen as a direct replacement for the Chester greyhound stadium, which closed in January 1987. A 15 year lease was given by the council to the Ellesmere Port Greyhound Company, the first promoter was Mr. Trevor Andrews of Stoke on Trent.

Over 500 people attended the first races on the coldest night of the year exacerbated by high winds. Go Ben Go won the first race over 310 yards. Mr. Denis Jones of Leeswood his owner confirmed that "his dogs had raced at eight tracks and Ellesmere Port was by far the best".

The racing was independent (not affiliated to the National Greyhound Racing Club) and was known as a flapping track, the nickname given to independent tracks. Racing took place on Monday and Saturday evenings. The track circumference was 410 yards, with original race distances of 310, 525, 650 and 710 yards. The hare system was an 'Inside Sumner' and the track had long straights and exceptionally wide bends. The main annual events were the Cheshire Oaks and Whitbread Open.

At the beginning of 2001 the then promoters, Track Star Promotions went into liquidation and the stadium stood empty for the majority of the year. Two companies, one proposing a return of speedway racing and another greyhounds vied for council approval. Greyhounds were given the go ahead and speedway refused on the grounds of noise and general disturbance, and the possibility the development could lead to the loss of the stadium's football pitch.

Emergency repairs were ordered due to the state of the stadium in 2007 and a 125 year lease was signed in 2008. In 2013, £170,000 was spent in upgrading by Liverpool-based entrepreneur Phillip Warren who had bought the rights to promote at the stadium, including new racing facilities and kennels.

== Closure ==
The stadium closed on June 1st 2014, a dog called Rumple winning the last race. In 2015 Galliford Try Partnerships bought the 10-acre former dog racing site from Cheshire West & Chester Council for £3.65m. The council retained the freehold interest in the site. The council worked alongside Warren's company Ellesmere Port Greyhound Stadium on the sale.

In June 2018 Galliford Try Partnerships began sales at their Chase Park development which provided a mix of 141 new homes. Chase Park was chosen to reflect the greyhound racing heritage.

The development included the construction of 30% affordable homes which the council purchased from Galliford once completed. Of these 35 were available for shared ownership, 10 for affordable rent and 11 for outright sale. Over £7m was invested by Sanctuary Homes, with part funding from Homes England, to provide the 56 properties.
