= Chris Turner (speedway rider) =

British motorcycle speedway rider (born 1958)

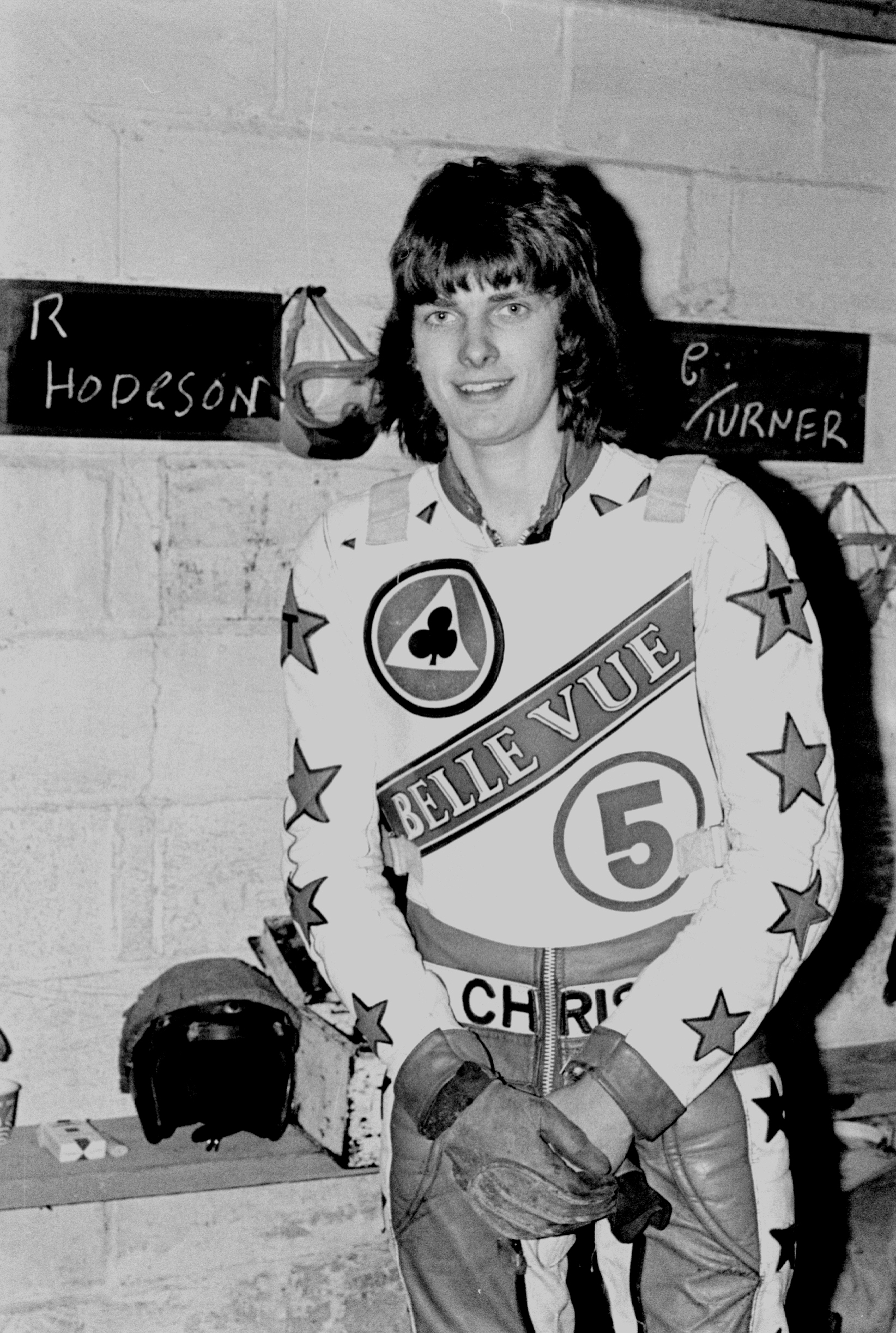
- Born: 28 May 1958 (age 68); Crewe, England
- Nationality: British (English)

Career history
- 1975–1978: Belle Vue Aces
- 1975: Crewe Kings
- 1976: Ellesmere Port Gunners
- 1979: Leicester Lions
- 1979: Stoke Potters
- 1980: Boston Barracudas
- 1980: King's Lynn Stars
- 1980–1983: Edinburgh Monarchs

Team honours
- 1976: National League Best Pairs Champion
- 1977, 1978: Northern Trophy
- 1981: National League KO Cup Winner
- 1981: National League Fours Winner

Christopher Turner (born 28 May 1958) is a former motorcycle speedway rider from England.

== Biography ==
Born in Crewe, Cheshire, Turner took up speedway at the age of fourteen at the training school at Belle Vue. He also competed in grasstrack racing as a junior. He made his competitive debut for Belle Vue in a challenge match in 1974, and in 1975 spent most of the season with Crewe Kings in the National League, also riding in a few matches for Belle Vue.

In 1976, Turner rode for Ellesmere Port Gunners in the National League for whom he averaged more than nine points per match, as well as riding in the British League for Belle Vue, for whom he averaged over five points. He won the National League Pairs with Ellesmere in 1976. In 1977 and 1978, he was a regular part of Belle Vue's British League team, before signing for Leicester Lions in 1979. He struggled to score well and was loaned to National League Stoke Potters for much of the season, although he was recalled by the Lions later in the season.

In 1980, Turner rode for Boston Barracudas, and also rode for King's Lynn Stars in the British League, although having averaged below three points for the Stars it proved to be his last spell in the top flight. He moved on to Edinburgh Monarchs for whom he rode until his retirement in 1983.

In 1981, Turner helped the Edinburgh Monarchs win the Fours Championship during the 1981 National League season.

Turner represented England at National League level against Scotland in 1981 and 1982.
