= Steve Finch =

British speedway rider

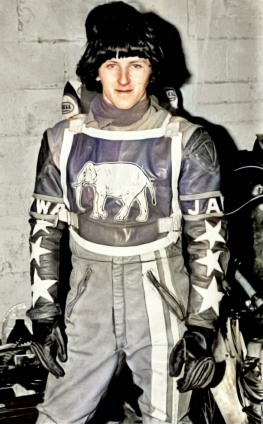
- Born: 8 January 1958 (age 68); Middlestown, England
- Nationality: British (English)

Career history
- 1974: Long Eaton Archers
- 1975, 1986–1987: Berwick Bandits
- 1975–1977, 1983–1984: Halifax Dukes
- 1976–1982: Ellesmere Port Gunners
- 1978, 1980: Belle Vue Aces
- 1979–1980: Sheffield Tigers
- 1981: Wimbledon Dons
- 1985: Scunthorpe Stags
- 1985: Edinburgh Monarchs
- 1986: Birmingham Brummies

Individual honours
- 1978: World U21 finalist

Team honours
- 1978: National League Pairs winner
- 1979: National League Fours winner
- 1978, 1979: Northern Trophy winner

Steve Finch (born 8 January 1958) is a former motorcycle speedway rider from England.

== Career ==
Finch started his British leagues career during the 1974 British League Division Two season, where he rode for Long Eaton Invaders. He rode for Berwick Bandits in 1975, in addition to appearing for Halifax Dukes in the highest league.

In 1976, Finch once again doubled up for Halifax but joined Ellesmere Port for the 1977 National League season and he began to forge a reputation as one of the top riders in the National league, surpassing a nine average in the 1979 and 1980 seasons.

In 1978, Finch won the British League Division Two Pairs Championship with John Jackson and reached the final of the 1978 Individual Speedway Junior European Championship, finishing just outside the medals in fourth place.

In 1979, Finch helped the Ellesmere Port win the Fours Championship during the 1979 season.

After averaging 9.92 during the 1980 National League season, Finch continued to ride in the National league for Ellesmere Port in 1981 and 1982 and then various other clubs until the end of the 1987 season.
