= Louis Carré =

Louis Carré is the name of:

- Louis Carré (art dealer) (1897–1977), French art dealer
- Louis Carré (footballer) (1925–2002), Belgian footballer
- Louis Carré (mathematician) (1663–1711), French mathematician

== See also ==
- Louis Carr (disambiguation)
