= John Branney =

British speedway rider

- Born: 7 November 1985 (age 41); Whitehaven, England
- Nationality: British (English)

Career history
- 2003-2004: Newcastle Gems
- 2007: Berwick Bandits
- 2006-2010: Workington Comets
- 2010: Glasgow Tigers

Team honours
- 2008: Young Shield
- 2005: Conference League Champion

John James Branney (born 7 November 1985 in Whitehaven, Cumbria) is a former motorcycle speedway rider from England.

== Career ==
Branney rode for the Workington Comets in the Premier League from 2006 to 2010.

== Family ==
Branney's brother Craig was also a professional speedway rider.
