= Neil Leeks =

British former motorcycle speedway rider (born 1959)

- Born: 10 September 1959 (age 65); Ipswich, England
- Nationality: British (English)

Career history
- 1976-1978: Mildenhall Fen Tigers
- 1978: Leicester Lions

Neil Spencer Leeks (born 10 September 1959) is a British former motorcycle speedway rider who rode for Mildenhall Fen Tigers and Leicester Lions.

== Career ==
Born in Ipswich, Leeks made his debut in the National League for Mildenhall in 1976. In 1977, he established himself as a regular member of the Mildenhall Team and the following season also rode in the British League on loan to Leicester Lions, where he averaged just over three points from six matches.

Leeks represented England at National League level in 1977 against Australasia, scoring ten points in the fifth Test at Mildenhall. Injury hampered his riding and he retired at the end of the 1978 season.
