= Craig Branney =

British speedway rider

- Born: 31 July 1982 (age 44); Whitehaven, England
- Nationality: British (English)

Career history
- 2001, 2007: Workington Comets
- 2003, 2009: Newcastle Diamonds
- 2002, 2005: Hull Vikings
- 2004-2005: Oxford Cheetahs
- 2006, 2010: Berwick Bandits
- 2009: Stoke Potters

Team honours
- 2005: Conference League

Craig Harry Branney (born 31 July 1982 in Whitehaven, Cumbria) is a former motorcycle speedway rider from England.

== Career ==
Branney rode for the Oxford Silver Machine from 2004 to 2005 and then Berwick Bandits before joining Workington Comets in the Premier League in 2007. He missed the 2008 season because of a broken leg. In July 2009, Branney joined the Stoke Potters. His final season was in 2010 with the Berwick Bandits.

From 2011 to 2015, Branney was a Director at the Northside Speedway.

== Family ==
Branney's brother John also rode for the Workington Comets.
