= Rob Grant Sr. =

British motorcycle speedway rider

- Born: 17 February 1959 (age 67); Throckley, Newcastle upon Tyne
- Nationality: British (English)

Career history
- 1978–1991, 2002: Berwick Bandits
- 1984: Edinburgh Monarchs

Team honours
- 1980, 1989: Knockout Cup

Robert Grant Sr. (born 17 February 1959) is a former motorcycle speedway rider from England.

== Biography ==
Grant, born in Throckley, rode as a junior in the Berwick Bandits team before beginning his British leagues career riding one meeting for the first team during the 1978 National League season. The following season in 1979, he won the Berwick Bandits Stars of Tomorrow event and began to break into the Berwick first team.

Grant enjoyed a successful 1980 season participating as a regular team member and helping the Bandits win the Knockout Cup. Despite the problems encountered by his team in 1981 Grant became a fan's favourite improving his season average to 6.95 in 1981.

The only time during his career that Grant did not ride for Berwick was when he rode six matches for Edinburgh Monarchs in 1984.

Grant would ride 14 consecutive years for Berwick from 1978 to 1991 and in that time would win a second Knockout Cup with Berwick in 1989.

Grant made a short lived comeback during the 2001 season, at the age of 43.

== Family ==
Grant's father Alec and son Rob Jr. were both professional speedway riders.
