= Ellesmere Port Gunners =

Club information
- Track address: Ellesmere Port Stadium; Thornton Road; Ellesmere Port; Wirral
- Country: England
- Founded: 1972
- Closed: 1985
- Team manager: Ian Thomas, Joe Shaw
- Team captain: Steve Finch; John Jackson; Eric Monaghan
- League: British League Division Two; National League

Club facts
- Colours: Red and Yellow
- Track size: 389 metres (425 yd)

Major team honours
National League Champions	1985
National League Best Pairs Champions	1976, 1978, 1985
National League Fours Champions	1979

Ellesmere Port Gunners were an English speedway team in Ellesmere Port, Wirral, which operated at the Ellesmere Port Stadium from 1972 until their closure in 1985.

== History ==
The inaugural league season for the team was during the 1972 British League Division Two season in which they finished in 15th place. The first track record on the 424 yard track was 76.0 seconds, set by John Jackson on 2 May 1972. The team continued to operate from 1972 until 1982 continuously competing in Division Two for 11 years, with a best place finish of 2nd in 1976.

Ellesmere Port finished runner-up to Newcastle Diamonds during the 1976 National League season led by number 1 rider John Jackson. For the 1977 National League season, the Gunners were installed as favourites to win the league but the team managed by co-promoter Joe Shaw failed to live up to expectations and finished third. A rider died on the Ellesmere Port track on 3 December 1977. Stuart Shirley lost his life on a Saturday morning training school after a collision.

At the end of the 1978 season the Gunners sold their star rider Phil Collins to Cradley Heath for £15,000, which set a new British transfer record at the time.

In 1983 the Gunners dropped out of the league despite reaching the previous season's KO Cup final and assurances by promoter Richard Park that the team would continue racing at Thornton Road amidst rising costs.

The club was resurrected for one season in 1985 and went on to win the title during the 1985 National League season. They won the title after beating Poole Pirates and Middlesbrough Tigers by just one point. The team also reached the final of the Knockout Cup but lost to Eastbourne Eagles. The eventual track record went twice on the same night during the Knock-Out Cup Final 1st-leg. Gordon Kennett of Eastbourne clocked 69.2 only to be beaten by The Gunners Louis Carr in the very next heat with a time of 69.1.

The speedway track was replaced by a greyhound racing track in late 1987.

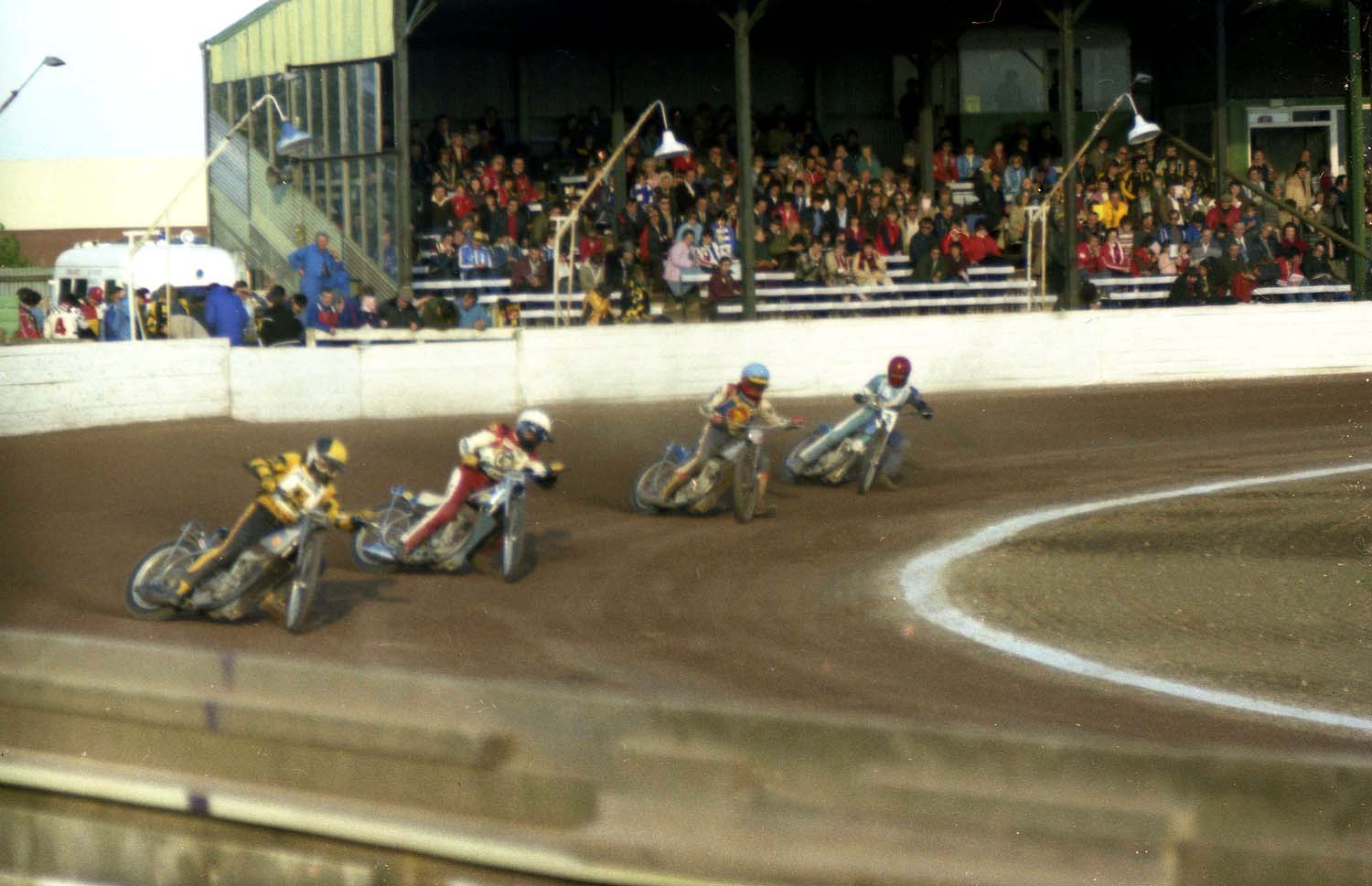
Ellesmere Port racing away at Boston on 31 May 1981

== Notable riders ==
- Louis Carr
- Phil Collins
- Graham Drury
- Steve Finch
- Colin Goad
- John Jackson
- Eric Monaghan
- Dave Morton
- Joe Owen
- Chris Turner
- Paul Tyrer
- David Walsh

== Season summary ==
Extended content

Year and league	Position	Notes
1972 British League Division Two season	15th	
1973 British League Division Two season	14th	
1974 British League Division Two season	14th	
1975 New National League season	9th	
1976 National League season	2nd	
1977 National League season	3rd	
1978 National League season	5th	
1979 National League season	9th	
1980 National League season	10th	
1981 National League season	11th	
1982 National League season	3rd	
1985 National League season	1st	Champions
