= Karl Fiala =

British speedway rider (born 1956)

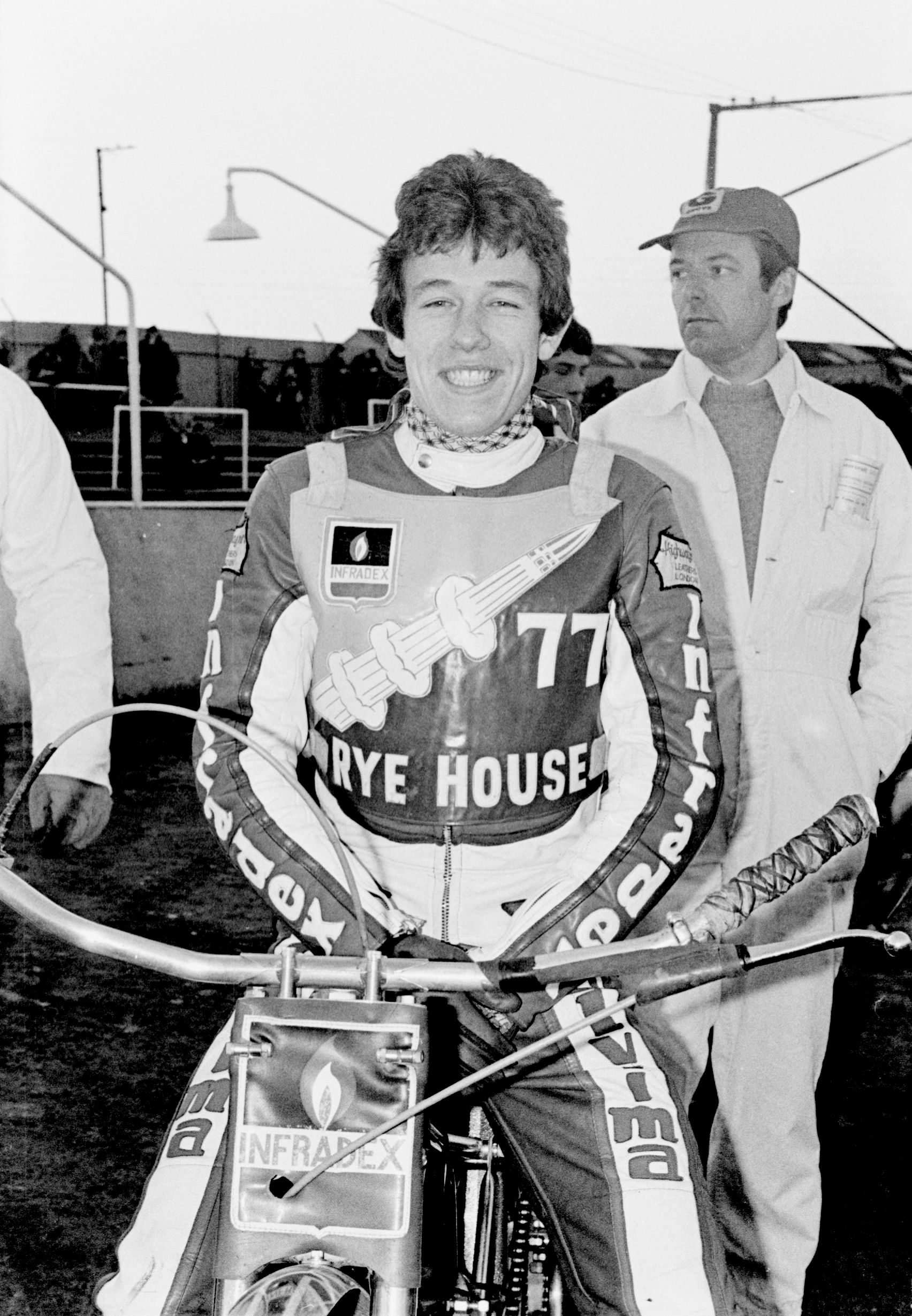
- Fiala in 1977
- Born: 30 January 1956 (age 70); Harlow, England
- Nationality: British (English)

Career history
- 1975-1980: Rye House Rockets
- 1976-1980: Hackney Hawks

Team honours
- 1979: National League KO Cup Winner
- 1980: National League Champion

Karol Roman Fiala (born 30 January 1956) better known as Karl Fiala, is a former motorcycle speedway rider from England.

== Career ==
Fiala began grasstrack racing in 1973 and began his league racing career with Rye House Rockets during the 1975 National League season. The following season, he doubled up with parent club Hackney Hawks, for whom he rode sporadically.

On 1 May 1977, Fiala won a World Championship qualifying round at Rye House with a 15-point maximum. Fiala continued to ride primarily for Rye House and won the silver hemlet match race twice in 1979 and helped his team win the 1979 Knockout Cup.

The 1980 season resulted in Fiala helping Rye House to win against Middlesbrough Bears on 9 October, with a paid 15 point maximum. He won the last race of the match to secure the league title for Rye House during the 1980 National League season.

== Personal life ==
Fiala also worked as an engineer for a company that made Life Support and Anaesthetic Equipment.

In 1988, Fiala joined a Direct Mail Print Company and, in 2002, started his own business in this line, which is still running today. A keen squash player until knee-joint problems forced retirement from league competition.
