= Colin Goad =

British civil servant

Sir Colin Goad
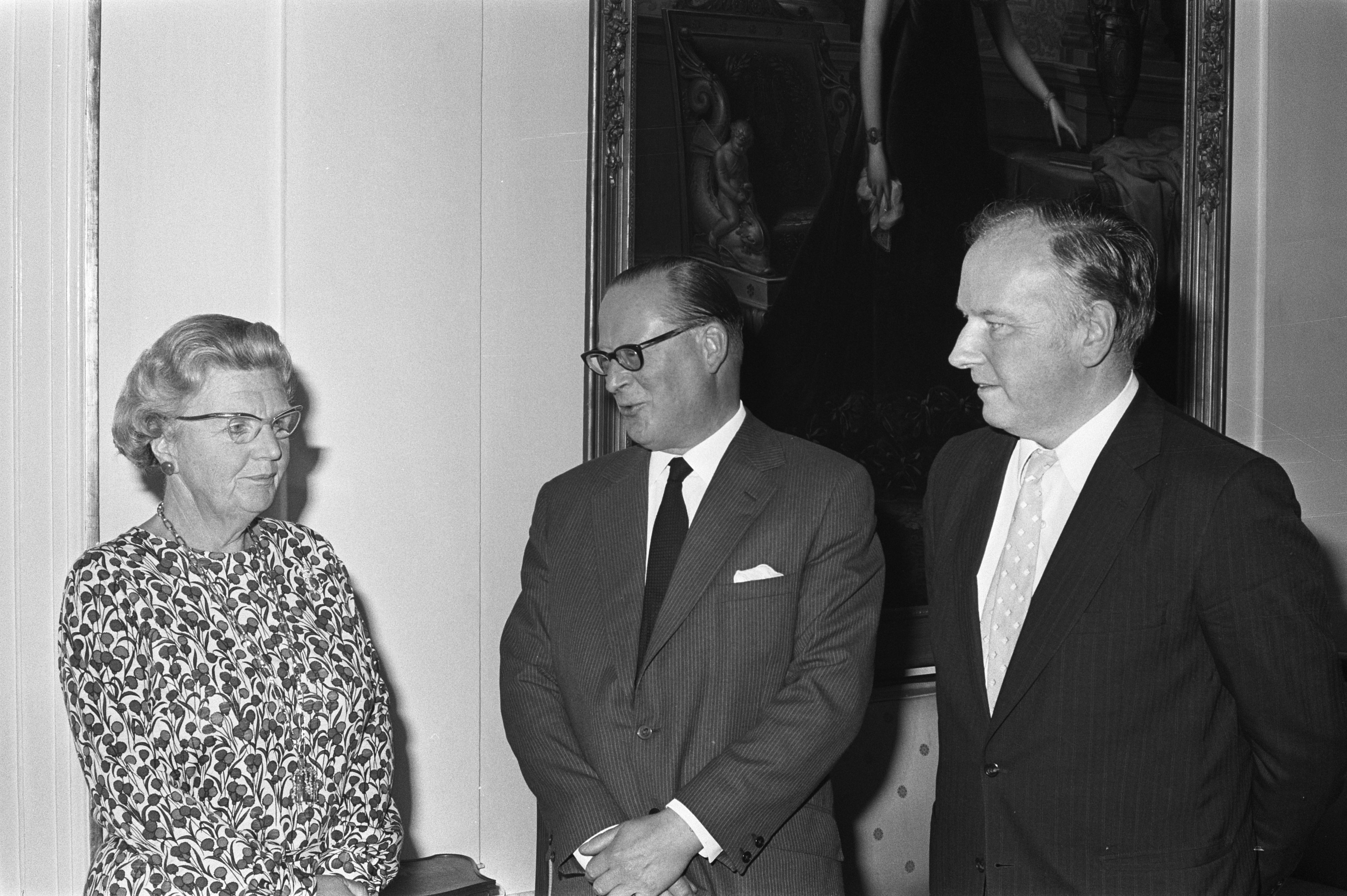
- Colin Goad (middle), 1972

4th Secretary General of the International Maritime Organization
- In office 1 January 1968 – 31 December 1973
- Preceded by: Jean Roullier
- Succeeded by: Chandrika Prasad Srivastava

Sir Colin Goad (1914–1998) was a British civil servant who served as Secretary-General of the International Maritime Organization, then known as the Inter-Governmental Maritime Consultative Organization (IMCO). He served as Secretary-General from 1968 to 1973.

== Life and career ==
Goad was born on 31 December 1914 in Cirencester, Gloucestershire. He was educated at Cirencester Grammar School and then studied history at Gonville and Caius College, Cambridge University.

In 1937 Goad joined the British Civil Service, working at the Department for Transport. He was promoted to Under-Secretary in 1963. In January 1959 he attended the First Assembly of the IMCO. Goad worked on the organization's maritime safety committee before being Deputy Secretary General and serving in this role between 1963 and 1968.

Goad was appointed Secretary-General of the organization on 1 January 1968. In 1967 Goad remarked that the Torrey Canyon oil spill had a significant influence on the development of IMCO as the organization developed environmental rules (later to be the MARPOL Convention}. In 1969, Goad gave a speech at the International Legal Conference on Marine Pollutan damage which outlined IMCO's technical mandate and legal purview to improve maritime safety and protect the marine environment.

Goad served as Secretary-General until 31 December 1973 and then worked for the ship registries of Liberia and the Marshall Islands.

He died in Cirencester on 15 March 1998.

== Honours ==
On 15 June 1974 Goad was appointed Knight Commander of the Order of St Michael and St George.

== Legacy ==
His papers are held in the Bodleian Library.
