= Paul Tyrer =

British motorcycle speedway rider

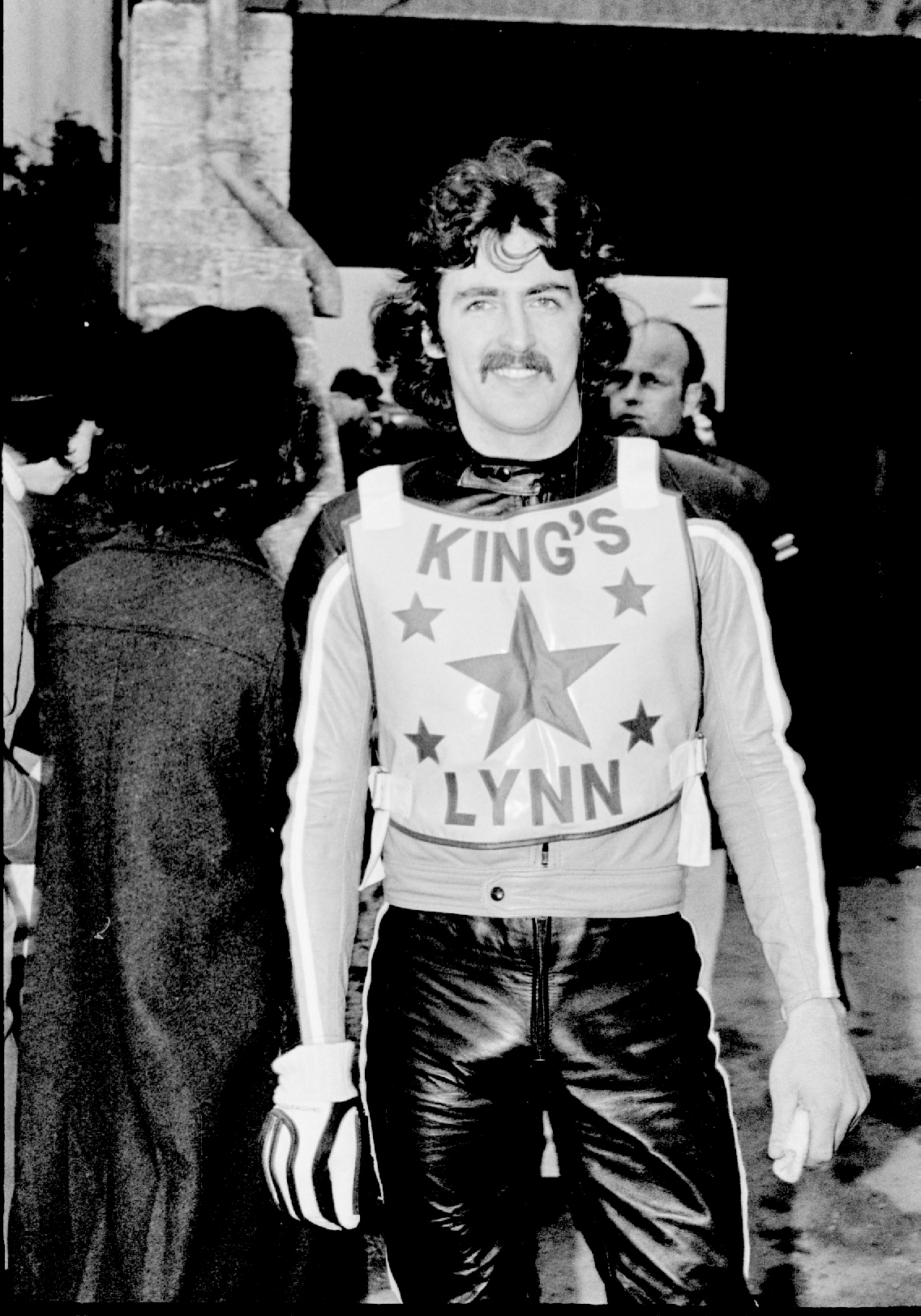
- Born: 5 December 1952 (age 73); Manchester, England
- Nationality: British (English)

Career history
- 1970–1971: Rochdale Hornets
- 1972–1976: Belle Vue Aces
- 1972, 1978–1979: Ellesmere Port Gunners
- 1977: King's Lynn Stars
- 1978: Bristol Bulldogs

Team honours
- 1972: League champion
- 1972, 1973, 1975, 1977: Knockout Cup
- 1975, 1976: Northern Trophy

Paul David Tyrer (born 5 December 1952) is a former international motorcycle speedway rider from England. He earned one international cap for the England national speedway team.

== Biography ==
Tyrer, born in Manchester, began his British leagues career riding for Rochdale Hornets during the 1970 British League Division Two season. The following season in 1971, he improved his league average to 8.71 in just his second season of racing.

Tyrer began to appear for Belle Vue Aces in the top league in 1972 and contributed towards their league and cup double winning season, although he spent most of the season with Ellesmere Port Gunners, where he topped the averages for his team.

Tyrer spent the next four years at Belle Vue, winning the 1973 and 1975 Knockout Cups before signing for King's Lynn Stars in 1977 and winning a fourth Knockout Cup title.

After starting the 1978 season with Bristol Bulldogs, Tyrer dropped to the National League to ride for his former club Ellesmere Port, with whom he raced his final season in 1979.
