= Graham Jones (speedway rider, born 1947) =

British motorcycle speedway rider

- Born: 28 December 1947 (age 78); Lowestoft, Suffolk, England
- Nationality: British (English)

Career history
- 1971: Boston Barracudas
- 1972–1981: Berwick Bandits

Team honours
- 1980: Knockout Cup (tier 2)

Graham Alan Jones (born 28 December 1947) is a former motorcycle speedway rider from England.

== Biography ==
Jones, born in Lowestoft, Suffolk, began his British leagues career riding for Boston Barracudas during the 1971 British League Division Two season.

The following season in 1972, Jones initially was loaned to Berwick Bandits before signing for them and would remain with the Northumberland club for the rest of his career. He would become a fan's favourite and by the time he retired would also be regarded as a club legend.

Jones started with a season average of 4.26 in 1972 and improved to a high of 8.79 during the 1978 season. He helped the Bandits win their first trophy, the British League Division Two Knockout Cup during the 1980 National League season.
