= Berwick Bandits =

British speedway team

Club information
- Track address: Shielfield Park; Tweedmouth; Berwick-On-Tweed
- Country: England
- Founded: 1968; 58 years ago
- Promoter: Sarah Bullman & Steven Dews
- Team manager: Stewart Dickson
- Team captain: Jye Etheridge
- League: SGB Championship; National Development League
- Website: www.berwickspeedway.com

Club facts
- Colours: Black and Gold
- Track size: 386 metres (422 yd)
- Track record time: 62.9 seconds
- Track record date: 21 October 2020
- Track record holder: Dan Bewley

Current team
Rider	CMA
(Denmark) Peter Kildemand
(Norway) Lasse Fredriksen
(Australia) Nick Morris
(Sweden) Victor Palovaara
(Australia) Jye Etheridge (capt)
(England) Jack Smith
(Australia) Reid Battye

Major team honours
Gold Cup winners (tier 1)	1991
KO Cup winners (tier 2)	1980, 1989
Four-Team championship (tier 2)	2002, 2012
Division Three winners (tier 3)	1994, 1995
KO Cup winners (tier 3)	1995

The Berwick Bandits are a British speedway club, based in Berwick-upon-Tweed. They currently compete in the SGB Championship, racing at Shielfield Park, with home matches usually taking place on Saturday evenings. They used to run a second team in the National Development League, known as the Berwick Bullets.

== History ==
=== 1960s ===
The start of speedway in Berwick began in late 1967, when speedway promoter Danny Taylor left the Glasgow Tigers after one season due to travel problems from Glasgow to his chicken farm business in Jedburgh. He announced that he was in negotiation with Berwick Rangers to use Shielfield Park.

Berwick's debut season coincided with the inaugural British League Division Two season in 1968. Berwick's first home fixture was a challenge match against Newcastle Colts on 18 May 1968. The team struggled during their first two seasons finishing last in 1968 and 14th in 1969.

=== 1970s ===
Berwick competed in all nine seasons of the British League division 2 or the National League as it was called from 1975. The team only achieved mediocrity but the fans saw several number 1 riders including Doug Wyer, Graham Jones and Steve McDermott. The team did manage a fourth place finish and a Knockout Cup final appearance in 1979.

=== 1980s ===
The team finally won their first silverware during the 1980 National League season after winning the Division 2 Knockout Cup. Strong performances from McDermott and Wayne Brown also saw the team finish fourth; Brown was also the national league riders champion in 1980. The success achieved in 1980 was remarkable because the team raced knowing that they had been given notice to leave the stadium in September. the team raced their final fixtures at Brough Park including the second leg of the Knockout Cup. The football team unsuccessfully attempted to buy the speedway team during October 1980.

In 1981, the Bandits remained homeless and carried on riding home fixtures at Barrow, Workington and Glasgow before being forced to quit NL racing after a protest from Edinburgh boss Mike Parker. The Bandits were, however, allowed to defend their KO Cup, reaching the final against Edinburgh, which the Monarchs won.

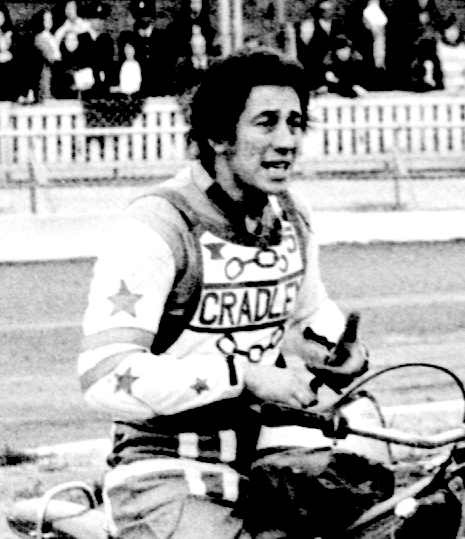
Bruce Cribb

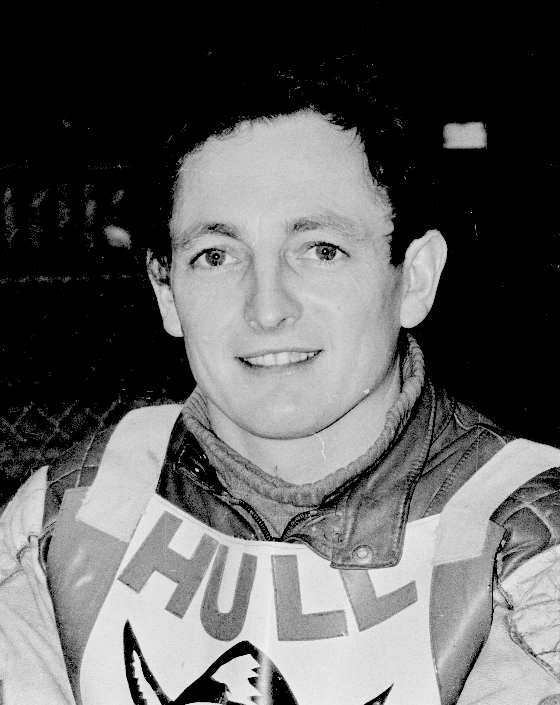
Jim McMillan

Work began in January 1982 on a new stadium at the Berrington Lough Stadium near Ancroft, Northumberland The first meeting was held on 24 April 1982, when Berwick defeated Edinburgh. From 1982 to 1988, Berwick were difficult to beat at home but gained little success, Bruce Cribb and Jim McMillan came and went by the time Mark Courtney and David Blackburn arrived. The pair helped the team win Knockout Cup for only the second time in their history but the team's talisman Steve McDermott had retired and missed the victory. McDerrmott was also national league riders champion in 1983.

=== 1990s ===
During the 1991 British League season (the team's only top flight season, whilst owned by Entrepreneur Terry Lindon) they won the Gold Cup. However, events deteriorated, with the club racing in tier 2 the following season and then missing the 1993 season only running two open meetings during that year. The team returned as an Academy team in 1994 and won two successive division three championships. The last meeting staged at Berrington Lough was the Academy League KO Cup Final against Stoke Potters on 21 October 1995.

The team had raced 13 years at Berrington Lough but due to its remote location the club were always fighting an uphill battle to maintain good attendances and make a profit. They did however win the British League Division Two Knockout Cup and Gold Cup while at the stadium. When the greyhound racing lease at Shielfield Park was ended by Berwick Rangers in 1995, the Berwick speedway promoter Mike Hope took the lease and the Bandits left Berrington Lough for their original home. On 9 July 1995, bikes returned to Shielfield Park for the first time in 15 years so that council officials could carry out noise tests, and on 17 August 1996, the Bandits started their second spell at the Tweedmouth track. The team moved back to the second tier called the Premier League in 1997 and ran a junior team in the third tier.

=== 2000s ===
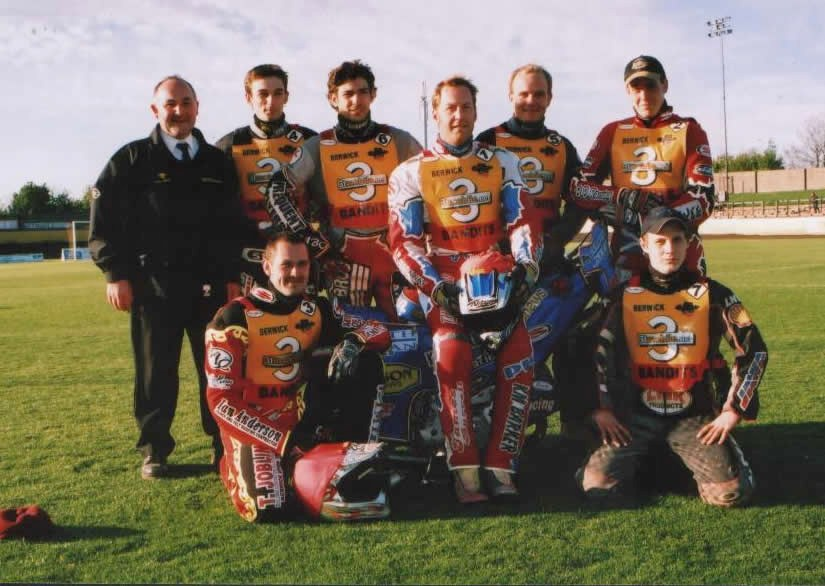
The 2003 Bandits team

Stability had returned to the club and Berwick's quad of Paul Bentley, Adrian Rymel, Michal Makovský and Claus Kristensen won the Premier League Four-Team Championship in 2002.

In 2005, the team finished 2nd in the Premier League and reached the semi-finals of the Knockout Cup and Young Shield. After an awful 2007, the Bandits made the final of the Young Shield, losing out to Workington Comets in what turned out to be promoter Peter Waite's last meeting in charge. In 2009, a new short-lived promotion came in, spearheaded by longtime supporter and North Berwick butcher John Anderson and Cornhill shopkeeper Linda Waite.

=== 2010s ===
Lynda Waite stepped down as promoter in 2010 and after her departure, John Anderson announced the new investor was George Hepburn, owner of Berwick building contractor George Hepburn and Son Ltd. It was then announced that Dave Peet (team manager, late-2008 to mid-2010) had departed from the club and had been replaced by the track curator and staff manager Ian Rae. Rae's association with speedway in Berwick-upon-Tweed extended back to his role as stadium manager at their Berrington Lough Stadium, followed by several years – up until 2001 – as team manager. The team recorded consecutive mid-table finishes from 2010 to 2014 but did win the Premier League Four-Team Championship for a second time in 2012.

In 2015, the Bandits owner John Anderson announced mid-season, amid a run of poor results and dwindling attendances, that it was time for someone new to take over or liquidate of the club's assets. Eventually three new associate directors (Michael Mullan, Dennis Hush and Darren Amers) came aboard, and the Bandits declared their intention to continue but the three resigned citing the incumbent owner's reluctance to change.

In 2016, John Anderson and his fellow directors Ryan Anderson and George Hepburn sold the club to 2016 team manager Scott Courtney, his younger brother Jamie Courtney and 1992 world champion Gary Havelock. The turmoil at the top was mirrored on the track with continual team changes and a bottom of the league finish in 2017.

In 2018, Havelock left the club and in 2019, Scott Courtney took a 'back-seat role' in the club, leaving his brother Jamie, along with new co-promoters Gary Flint and Steven Dews. In 2019, Berwick narrowly missed out on a play-off spot for the second season running.

=== 2020s ===
Following a season lost to the COVID-19 pandemic,(The only meeting that year being the British U21 final ran behind closed doors and live streamed) the Bandits returned to race in the SGB Championship. The track underwent changes in specifications during 2024.

== Season Summary (Bandits) ==
Extended content

Year and League	Position	Notes
1968 British League Division Two	10th	
1969 British League Division Two	14th	
1970 British League Division Two	16th	
1971 British League Division Two	8th	
1972 British League Division Two	14th	
1973 British League Division Two	17th	
1971 British League Division Two	11th	
1975 New National League	7th	
1976 National League	10th	
1977 National League	18th	
1978 National League	11th	
1979 National League	4th	
1980 National League	4th	Knockout Cup Winners
1981 National League	N/A	Withdrew, Results Expunged
1982 National League	9th	
1983 National League	8th	
1984 National League	5th	
1985 National League	9th	
1986 National League	14th	
1987 National League	6th	
1988 National League	5th	
1989 National League	3rd	Knockout Cup Winners
1990 National League	6th	
1991 British League	5th	
1992 British League Division Two	2nd	
1994 British League Division Three	1st	League Winners
1995 Academy League	1st	League & Knockout Cup Winners
1996 Conference League	3rd	
1997 Premier League	13th	
1998 Premier League	12th	
1999 Premier League	7th	
2000 Premier League	12th	
2001 Premier League	12th	
2002 Premier League	4th	
2003 Premier League	5th	
2004 Premier League	9th	
2005 Premier League	2nd	
2006 Premier League	11th	
2007 Premier League	15th	
2008 Premier League	6th	
2009 Premier League	12th	
2010 Premier League	8th	
2011 Premier League	9th	
2012 Premier League	10th	
2013 Premier League	10th	
2014 Premier League	4th	
2015 Premier League	10th	
2016 Premier League	10th	
SGB Championship 2017	10th	
SGB Championship 2018	5th	
SGB Championship 2019	5th	
SGB Championship 2021	9th	
SGB Championship 2022	8th	
SGB Championship 2023	8th	
SGB Championship 2024	9th	
SGB Championship 2025	5th	

== Season Summary (Juniors) ==
Extended content

Berwick Bullets formerly Berwick Border Raiders are the development side to the Bandits. For the 2021 National League season, the team was Leon Flint and Kyle Bickley (the two riders named as the reserves for the main team in 2021) with the remaining five riders being: Greg Blair, Ben Rathbone, Ryan MacDonald, Kieran Douglas, and Mason Watson.

Year and league	Position	Notes
1997 Conference League	2nd	Border Raiders
2021 National Development League	2nd	Bullets
2022 National Development League	3rd	PO semi, Bullets
2023 National Development League	8th	Bullets

== Riders previous seasons ==
Extended content

2006 team

- (Poland) Jacek Rempała
- (Poland) Stanisław Burza
- (Sweden) Andreas Bergström
- (Czech Republic) Michal Makovsky
- (England) Craig Branney
- (England) David Meldrum
- (England) Lee Smethills
- (England) Danny Warwick

2007 team

- (Poland) Jacek Rempała
- (Poland) Stanisław Burza
- (Sweden) Andreas Bergström
- (Czech Republic) Michal Makovsky
- (Netherlands) Theo Pijper
- (England) David Meldrum
- (England) Sam Martin

Also rode

- (England) Jamie Robertson
- (England) Benji Compton
- (Poland) Sebastian Trumiński
- (England) John Branney
- (England) Michael Coles

2008 team

- (Czech Republic) Adrian Rymel
- (Czech Republic) Michal Makovsky
- (Finland) Tero Aarnio
- (Hungary) Tamas Sike
- (Italy) Guglielmo Franchetti
- (England) Paul Clews
- (England) Scott Smith

Also Rode:

- (Scotland) Adam McKinna
- (England) Tony Atkin
- (Hungary) Norbert Magosi
- (Denmark) Henning Bager

2009 team

- (Czech Republic) Michal Makovsky
- (Czech Republic) Josef Franc
- (Finland) Tero Aarnio
- (England) Paul Clews
- (Italy) Guglielmo Franchetti
- (Poland) Stanislaw Burza
- (Hungary) Tamas Sike

Also rode

- (Germany) Frank Facher
- (Scotland) William Lawson
- (Scotland) Greg Blair
- (England) Danny Warwick

2010 team

- (Czech Republic) Adrian Rymel
- (New Zealand) Jade Mudgway
- (Czech Republic) Michal Makovsky
- (England) Lee Complin
- (England) Paul Clews
- (Poland) Michal Rajkowski
- (Poland) Marcin Rempała
- (Poland) Grzegorz Stróżyk

Also Rode

- (England) Craig Branney
- (Denmark) Anders Anderson

2011 team

- (Sweden) Sebastian Aldén
- (Sweden) Ludvig Lindgren
- (Sweden) Linus Eklof
- (Czech Republic) Josef Franc
- (England) Lee Complin
- (Australia) Mitchell Davey
- (New Zealand) Jade Mudgway

Also Rode

- (Australia) Kozza Smith
- (Sweden) Alexander Edberg
- (Czech Republic) Hynek Štichauer
- (Hungary) Tamas Sike
- (Denmark) Charlie Gjedde

2012 team

- (England) Ricky Ashworth
- (Australia) Matthew Wethers
- (France) David Bellego
- (Australia) Kozza Smith
- (Sweden) Robin Aspgren
- (Sweden) Alex Edberg
- (Denmark) Nicki Barrett

Also rode

- (Sweden) Alex Edberg

2013 team

- (England) Ricky Ashworth
- (England) Jason King
- (England) Lee Complin
- (France) David Bellego
- (Sweden) Seb Alden
- (Australia) Micky Dyer
- (Denmark) Klaus Jakobsen

Also rode

- (England) Liam Carr
- (Sweden) Alex Edberg
- (Czech Republic) Lubos Tomicek

2014 team

- (Denmark) Claus Vissing
- (Australia) Matthew Wethers
- (Australia) Kevin Doolan
- (Czech Republic) Matej Kus
- (France) David Bellego
- (England) Liam Carr
- (Denmark) Steen Jensen

Also rode

- (England) Paul Starke
- (Scotland) James McBain

2015 team

- (England) Ben Barker
- (Denmark) Claus Vissing
- (Denmark) Thomas Jørgensen
- (Australia) Kevin Doolan
- (England) Richard Hall
- (Sweden) Anders Mellgren
- (Argentina) Coty Garcia

Also rode

- (Slovenia) Matic Voldrih
- (Czech Republic) Hynek Štichauer
- (England) Luke Crang
- (Sweden) Alex Edberg

2016 team

- (Denmark) Thomas Jørgensen
- (Sweden) Sebastian Aldén
- (Australia) Kevin Doolan
- (Netherlands) Theo Pijper
- (Australia) Matthew Wethers
- (Netherlands) Romano Hummel
- (England) Liam Carr

also rode

- (Austria) Dany Gappmaier
- (Denmark) Henning Bager
- (Poland) Dawid Stachyra
- (Sweden) Anders Mellgren
- (England) Tom Perry

2019 team

- (Australia) Aaron Summers
- (Sweden) Thomas H. Jonasson
- (Australia) Jye Etheridge
- (Australia) Kevin Doolan
- (Austria) Dany Gappmaier
- (Argentina) Coty Garcia
- (England) Leon Flint

2021 team

- (Denmark) Kasper Andersen
- (England) Kyle Bickley
- (Australia) Jye Etheridge
- (England) Leon Flint
- (Austria) Dany Gappmaier
- (Denmark) Nikolaj Busk Jakobsen
- (Australia) Aaron Summers

Also Rode

- (Argentina) Coty Garcia

2022 team

- (Australia) Jye Etheridge
- (England) Leon Flint
- (England) Chris Harris (C)
- (Denmark) Jonas Knudsen
- (Netherlands) Theo Pijper
- (Wales) Nathan Stoneman
- (United States) Ricky Wells

Also Rode

- (England) Kyle Bickley
- (Australia) Ty Proctor

== Notable riders ==
- (England) Paul Bentley
- (England) David Blackburn
- (England) Wayne Brown
- (New Zealand) Bruce Cribb
- (England) Mark Courtney
- (Australia) Kevin Doolan
- (England) Rob Grant Sr.
- (England) Graham Jones
- (Scotland) Kevin Little
- (Czech Republic) Michal Makovský
- (England) Steve McDermott
- (Scotland) Jim McMillan
- (Czech Republic) Adrian Rymel
- (Scotland) Willie Templeton
- (England) Doug Wyer

== See also ==
- Category:Berwick Bandits riders
