= List of United Kingdom Speedway Fours Champions =

British speedway competition

The List of United Kingdom Speedway Fours Champions is the list of teams and riders who have won the United Kingdom's Fours Championship that corresponded to the relevant league at the time. The list is split into three divisions, the top tier, the second tier and third tier, all three divisions have been known in various guises such as National League and Premier League, etc. This list gives a complete listing of the winners for each season.

During some years there was only one or two divisions, such as 1995 and 1996, when the top two tiers of speedway merged.

== Fours Champions (chronological order) ==
=== Tier One ===
- British League Four-Team Championship 1993–1994
- Premier League Four-Team Championship 1995–1996
- Elite League Four-Team Championship 1997

=== Tier Two ===
- National League Four-Team Championship 1976-1994
- Premier League Four-Team Championship 1997–2016
- SGB Championship Fours 2017–present

=== Tier Three ===
- Conference League Four-Team Championship 2003–2008
- National League Fours 2009–2018
- NDL Fours 2019–present

== List of winners ==
Year	Tier one	Year	Tier two	Year	Tier three
1976	not held	1976	Newcastle Diamonds		
1977	not held	1977	Peterborough Panthers		
1978	not held	1978	Peterborough Panthers		
1979	not held	1979	Ellesmere Port Gunners		
1980	not held	1980	Crayford Kestrels		
1981	not held	1981	Edinburgh Monarchs		
1982	not held	1982	Newcastle Diamonds		
1983	not held	1983	Newcastle Diamonds		
1984	not held	1984	Mildenhall Fen Tigers		
1985	not held	1985	Middlesbrough Tigers		
1986	not held	1986	Middlesbrough Tigers		
1987	not held	1987	Mildenhall Fen Tigers		
1988	not held	1988	Peterborough Panthers		
1989	not held	1989	Peterborough Panthers		
1990	not held	1990	Stoke Potters		
1991	not held	1991	Arena Essex Hammers		
1992	not held	1992	Peterborough Panthers		
1993	Reading Racers	1993	Edinburgh Monarchs		
1994	Poole Pirates	1994	Oxford Cheetahs		
1995	Cradley Heath	1995	Div 1&2 merged		
1996	Oxford Cheetahs	1996	Div 1&2 merged		
1997	Peterborough Panthers	1997	Long Eaton Invaders		
1998	not held	1998	Peterborough Panthers		
1999	not held	1999	Sheffield Tigers		
2000	not held	2000	Sheffield Tigers		
2001	not held	2001	Workington Comets		
2002	not held	2002	Berwick Bandits		
2003	not held	2003	Swindon Robins	2003	Rye House Raiders
2004	not held	2004	Workington Comets	2004	Mildenhall Fen Tigers
2005	not held	2005	Somerset Rebels	2005	Weymouth Wildcats
2006	not held	2006	Workington Comets	2006	Stoke Spitfires
2007	not held	2007	Isle of Wight Islanders	2007	Scunthorpe Scorpions
2008	not held	2008	Workington Comets	2008	Weymouth Wildcats
2009	not held	2009	Workington Comets	2009	not held
2010	not held	2010	Birmingham Brummies	2010	not held
2011	not held	2011	Ipswich Witches	2011	Dudley Heathens
2012	not held	2012	Berwick Bandits	2012	Mildenhall Fen Tigers
2013	not held	2013	Edinburgh Monarchs	2013	Dudley Heathens
2014	not held	2014	Somerset Rebels	2014	Cradley Heathens
2015	not held	2015	Edinburgh Monarchs	2015	Birmingham Brummies
2016	not held	2016	Plymouth Devils	2016	Rye House Raiders
2017	not held	2017	Peterborough Panthers	2017	not held
2018	not held	2018	Peterborough Panthers	2018	not held
2019	not held	2019	Somerset Rebels	2019	Stoke Potters
2020	not held	2020	cancelled due to COVID-19 pandemic	2020	cancelled due to COVID-19 pandemic
2021	not held	2021	not held	2021	not held
2022	not held	2022	not held	2022	not held
2023	not held	2023	not held	2023	not held
2024	not held	2024	not held	2024	not held
