= 1980 National League season =

British motorcycle speedway season

- League: National League
- No. of competitors: 20
- Champions: Rye House Rockets
- Knockout Cup: Berwick Bandits
- Individual: Wayne Brown
- Pairs: Middlesbrough Tigers
- Fours: Crayford Kestrels
- Highest average: Dave Perks
- Division/s above: 1980 British League

The 1980 National League was contested as the second division of Speedway in the United Kingdom.

== Summary ==
The league was increased from 19 teams to 20 from the previous season. Exeter Falcons dropped down from the British League to join the 19 incumbent sides.

Rye House Rockets who had been pipped to the title in the previous season in the last meeting, won the title by just one point from Newcastle Diamonds to win their first National League title. Rye House had managed to retain all of their top riders from the previous season and the solid performances of Bob Garrad, Karl Fiala, Kelvin Mullarkey and Kevin Smith for the second year running made up for the disappointment of 1979. Newcastle's second-place finish was remarkable bearing in mind that they had lost the league's leading rider Tom Owen to Hull Vikings in the highest division. Despite signing 1979 Riders' champion Ian Gledhill, the defending champions Mildenhall suffered after losing Melvyn Taylor and Mick Hines to other teams.

== Final table ==
Pos	Team	PL	W	D	L	Pts
1	Rye House Rockets	38	31	0	7	62
2	Newcastle Diamonds	38	30	1	7	61
3	Middlesbrough Tigers	38	27	2	9	56
4	Berwick Bandits	38	24	1	13	49
5	Edinburgh Monarchs	38	23	2	13	48
6	Boston Barracudas	38	23	2	13	48
7	Mildenhall Fen Tigers	38	21	2	15	44
8	Peterborough Panthers	38	21	0	17	42
9	Crayford Kestrels	37	20	1	16	41
10	Ellesmere Port Gunners	38	20	1	17	41
11	Glasgow Tigers	38	19	2	17	40
12	Exeter Falcons	38	17	1	20	35
13	Scunthorpe Stags	38	15	1	22	31
14	Nottingham Outlaws	38	14	2	22	30
15	Oxford Cheetahs	38	14	1	23	29
16	Stoke Potters	38	14	0	24	28
17	Weymouth Wildcats	37	13	1	23	27
18	Canterbury Crusaders	38	10	4	24	24
19	Milton Keynes Knights	38	8	2	28	18
20	Workington Comets	38	2	0	36	4

- Crayford v Weymouth fixture was never ridden.

== Fixtures and results ==
Home \ Away	BER	BOS	CAN	CRY	ED	EP	EX	GLA	MID	MIL	MK	NEW	NOT	OX	PET	RH	SCU	STO	WEY	WOR
Berwick		33–45	47–31	51–27	51–27	52–26	56–22	40–37	47–31	52–26	56–22	39–36	45–33	62–16	49–29	47–30	54–24	54–23	54–23	59–18
Boston	58–20		52–26	50–28	46–32	39–39	40–37	52–26	38–40	45–33	56–22	33–44	51–27	52–26	41–37	41–37	44–33	41–37	44–34	60–17
Canterbury	37–39	39–39		34–44	40–38	48–29	37–41	45–32	39–39	36–41	48–30	39–39	36–42	46–31	42–36	36–42	39–39	47–31	36–41	44–34
Crayford	41–34	41–37	55–22		38–39	54–24	58–20	40–38	41–37	41–37	45–33	37–41	46–32	43–35	59–19	35–43	50–28	52–25	n–h	65–12
Edinburgh	39–39	41–37	41–36	40–38		45–33	47–30	50–28	43–35	45–33	43–35	32–45	52–26	51–26	42–36	45–33	42–36	50–27	41–37	61–17
Ellesmere Port	52–26	38–40	38–40	43–35	50–28		53–25	46–32	41–37	42–36	52–26	41–37	50–28	44–33	53–25	42–36	55–23	50–28	49–29	62–16
Exeter	37–41	43–35	54–24	43–34	51–27	42–35		48–30	34–43	44–34	52–26	38–40	51–27	53–25	51–27	36–42	63–15	44–34	40–38	58–20
Glasgow	40–37	43–34	41–37	39–39	48–30	47–31	54–24		51–27	46–32	54–24	40–38	47–31	37–40	52–26	57–21	57–21	42–36	49–28	62–16
Middlesbrough	42.5–34.5	58–18	47–31	42–36	49–28	40–38	52–26	44–34		47–31	43–35	48–29	50–28	44–34	55–23	38–40	44–33	63–15	51–27	57–21
Mildenhall	41–37	42–36	40–38	41–37	45–33	43–34	46–32	49–29	39–39		46–31	33–45	40–38	52–25	38–40	38–40	50–28	53–25	55.5–22.5	62–16
Milton Keynes	38–40	28–49	40–38	38–40	35–43	40–38	39–39	39–39	31–47	48–29		30–47	41–37	45–33	36–42	26–52	33–44	43–35	50–28	57–20
Newcastle	42–36	47–31	42–36	47–31	48–30	45–33	48–30	53–25	38–40	53–25	56–22		49–29	60–17	48–29	49–29	53–25	54–24	41–37	59–19
Nottingham	44–34	33–45	48–30	36–42	36–42	33–45	43–34	44–34	36–42	39–39	44–34	43–35		46–32	54–24	40–38	44–34	35–42	43–35	59–19
Oxford	45–33	36–41	39–38	40–38	39–39	50–28	49–29	45–32	34–44	28–49	51–27	32–45	43–34		31–47	34–43	43–35	37–40	40–38	50–28
Peterborough	44–34	41–37	48–30	44–34	52–26	38–40	45–33	43–35	42–36	38–40	47–30	37–41	48–30	53–25		37–41	42–36	40–38	49–29	60–18
Rye House	50–28	47–29	56–22	40–38	52–26	48–30	58–20	59–19	43–35	47–31	57–21	45–32	52–26	50–27	56–22		53–25	56–22	54–24	63–13
Scunthorpe	34–44	42–36	46–32	35–43	35–42	46–32	50–28	44–34	42–36	29–49	44–34	35–43	42–36	37–40	45–33	34–44		46–31	43–35	52–25
Stoke	29–48	41–37	35–43	39–38	35–43	40–38	50–28	39–36	29–49	42–36	49–29	37–40	43–34	43–34	38–39	27–51	38–40		41–37	54–24
Weymouth	41–37	37–41	39–38	41–36	50–28	40–38	48–30	38–40	32–45	37–41	45–33	31–47	39–39	47–31	37–41	36–41	38–18	48–30		62–16
Workington	28–47	23–55	40–37	35–43	30–48	26–49	35–43	26–52	27–49	30–48	40–38	20–58	38–40	35–43	34–44	31–46	33–45	36–42	33–44	

Legend: Blue = home team win; Yellow = draw; Red = away team win.

nh = not held

== National League Knockout Cup ==
The 1980 National League Knockout Cup was the 13th edition of the Knockout Cup for tier two teams. Berwick Bandits were the winners of the competition for the first time, having been runners-up three times in the previous four seasons.

First round

Date	Team one	Score	Team two
03/05	Berwick	52-26	Newcastle
28/04	Newcastle	41-37	Berwick
25/05	Mildenhall	45-33	Rye House
26/05	Rye House	44-34	Mildenhall
04/05	Boston	54-24	Stoke
05/05	Stoke	27-51	Boston

Second round

Date	Team one	Score	Team two
07/06	Berwick	46-32	Ellesmere Port
13/06	Ellesmere Port	42-36	Berwick
23/05	Edinburgh	42-34	Glasgow
25/05	Glasgow	40-37	Edinburgh
01/06	Mildenhall	46-32	Nottingham
18/06	Nottingham	37-41	Mildenhall
07/06	Canterbury	44-33	Milton Keynes
10/06	Milton Keynes	40-38	Canterbury
19/06	Middlesbrough	51-27	Scunthorpe
29/06	Scunthorpe	37-40	Middlesbrough
05/06	Oxford	40-37	Weymouth
27/06	Weymouth	40-38	Oxford
08/06	Boston	59-19	Workington
11/07	Workington	26-52	Boston
13/06	Peterborough	42-25	Crayford
22/07	Crayford	41-37	Peterborough

Quarter-finals

Date	Team one	Score	Team two
20/07	Berwick	47-31	Edinburgh
18/07	Edinburgh	39-39	Berwick
23/07	Mildenhall	51-27	Canterbury
26/07	Canterbury	44-34	Mildenhall
24/07	Middlesbrough	45-33	Oxford
06/08	Oxford	32-46	Middlesbrough
31/08	Boston	50-27	Peterborough
12/09	Peterborough	39-39	Boston

Semi-finals

Date	Team one	Score	Team two
06/09	Berwick	52-26	Mildenhall
07/09	Mildenhall	41-37	Berwick
18/09	Middlesbrough	54-24	Boston
05/10	Boston	42-36	Middlesbrough

=== Final ===
First leg

26 October 1980

Middlesbrough Tigers Brian Havelock 10 Mike Spink 10 Steve Wilcock 9 Mark Courtney 6 Geoff Pusey 4 Martin Dixon 3 John Clegg 0	42 – 36	Berwick Bandits Mike Fullerton 11 Steve McDermott 9 Brett Saunders 6 Mike Caroline 5 Rob Grant 3 Nigel Close 2 Wayne Brown R/R

Cleveland Park Stadium

Second leg

29 October 1980

Berwick Bandits Steve McDermott 15 Mike Fullerton 9 Nigel Close 8 Rob Grant 8 Brett Saunders 3 Mike Caroline 0 Wayne Brown R/R	43 – 34	Middlesbrough Tigers Mark Courtney 11 Steve Wilcock 9 Geoff Pusey 6 Martin Dixon 6 Mike Spink 2 John Clegg 0 Alan Armstrong 0

Brough Park* (Berwick evicted from Shielfield Park)

Berwick were declared Knockout Cup Champions, winning on aggregate 79–76.

== Riders' Championship ==
Wayne Brown won the Riders' Championship, sponsored by Toshiba and held at Wimbledon Stadium on 28 September 1980.

Pos.	Rider	Pts	Total
1	(New Zealand) Wayne Brown	3 3 3 3 2	14
2	(England) Martin Yeates	2 1 3 3 3	12
3	(England) Steve Finch	2 2 2 3 3	12
4	(Australia) Gary Guglielmi	3 0 3 1 3	10
5	(England) Paul Woods	2 3 3 2	10
6	(Zimbabwe) Mike Ferreira	3 1 2 2 2	10
7	(England) Mike Sampson	3 2 2 2 1	10
8	(England) Rob Maxfield	0 3 0 2 3	8
9	(Australia) Rod Hunter	1 1 3 1	6
10	(England) Kelvin Mullarkey	1 2 1 1 1	6
11	(England) Steve Wilcock	2 0 0 2 1	5
12	(England) Andy Hines	1 1 2 1 0	5
13	(England) Phil White	1 0 1 1 2	5
14	(England) Ray Bales	3 1 0	4
15	(England) Derek Harrison	0 2 0 0 0	2
16	(England) Graham Knowler	1 0 0 0	1
17	(England) Keith Yorke	0	0

- f=fell, r-retired, ex=excluded, ef=engine failure

== Pairs ==
The National League Pairs was held at The Shay on 19 July and was won by Middlesbrough Tigers.

Group A
Pos	Team	Pts	Riders
1	Middlesbrough	11	Wilcock 6 Courtney 5
2	Ellesmere P	10	Finch 5 Jackson 5
3	Rye House	9	Garrad 7 Mullarkey 2
4	Weymouth	6	Woodward 6 Yeates 0

Group B
Pos	Team	Pts	Riders
1	Boston	13	Guglielmi 7 Hollingworth 6
2	Canterbury	9	Ferreira 5 Hubbard 4
3	Oxford	9	Perks 9 Hack 0
4	Edinburgh	5	Trownson 3 Lambert 2

Group C
Pos	Team	Pts	Riders
1	Crayford	12	Naylor 8 Woods 4
2	Exeter	9	Maxfield 7 Boocock 2
3	Berwick	9	Close 6 Brown 3
4	Scunthorpe	6	Browning 3 White 3

Group D
Pos	Team	Pts	Riders
1	Peterborough	11	Hines 6 Greer 5
2	Newcastle	11	Richardson 6 Blackadder 5
3	Mildenhall	7	Henry 4 Gledhill 2
4	Glasgow	7	Lawson 5 Reid 2

Semi finals

- Middlesbrough bt Crayford
- Boston bt Peterborough

Final

- Middlesbrough bt Boston

== Fours ==
Crayford Kestrels won the fours championship final, held at the East of England Arena on 27 July.

Semi finals

- SF1 = Crayford 17, Ellesmere Port 16, Berwick 8, Boston 7
- SF2 = Rye House 18, Stoke 15, Glasgow 8, Oxford 7

Final

Pos	Team	Pts	Riders
1	Crayford Kestrels	14	Rumsey 7, Woods 4, Naylor 3, Sage 0, Etheridge 0
2	Rye House Rockets	13	Garrad 4 Mullarkey 4, Smith 3, Pullen 2, Fiala 0
3	Ellesmere Port Gunners	12	Carr L 5, Jackson 3, Carr P 2, Finch 2, Ellams 0
4	Stoke Potters	9	Burton 6, Sawyer 2, Boyle 1, Stead 0, Evitts 0

== Leading final averages ==
	Rider	Nat	Team	C.M.A.
1	Dave Perks	(England)	Oxford Cheetahs	10.82
2	Paul Woods	(England)	Crayford Kestrels	10.47
3	Mike Ferreira	(Zimbabwe)	Canterbury Crusaders	10.32
4	Steve Wilcock	(England)	Middlesbrough Tigers	10.28
5	Steve Lawson	(England)	Glasgow Tigers	10.17

== Riders & final averages ==
Berwick

- Wayne Brown 9.49
- Steve McDermott 9.06
- Mike Fullerton 7.63
- Roger Wright 7.43
- Nigel Close 7.32
- Graham Jones 6.36
- Mike Caroline 5.71
- Brett Saunders 5.57
- Rob Grant Sr. 5.41

Boston

- David Gagen 9.80
- Gary Guglielmi 9.33
- Rob Hollingworth 8.57
- Steve Lomas 8.10
- Dennis Mallett 7.09
- Chris Turner 6.87
- Tony Featherstone 6.19
- Michael Holding 4.52
- Ian Turner 4.49
- Mike Spinks 4.04
- Chris Cole 2.24

Canterbury

- Mike Ferreira 10.32
- Barney Kennett 7.90
- Ted Hubbard 7.66
- Denzil Kent 6.64
- Dave Piddock 4.83
- Kevin Brice 3.65
- Rob Dolman 3.42
- Tony Reynolds 2.77
- Kevin Howland 2.22
- Simon Franks 1.25

Crayford

- Paul Woods 10.47
- Steve Naylor 8.02
- Les Rumsey 7.72
- Alan Sage 6.89
- Laurie Etheridge 6.00
- Mike Pither 5.30
- Alan Johns 5.12
- Paul Gilbert 3.68

Edinburgh

- George Hunter 8.88
- Dave Trownson 8.40
- Neil Collins 8.13
- Brian Collins 6.09
- Benny Rourke 5.97
- Harry Maclean 5.18
- Roger Lambert 5.13
- Arnold Haley 4.76

Ellesmere Port

- Steve Finch 9.92
- Louis Carr 8.57
- John Jackson 8.46
- Eric Monaghan 5.24
- John Williams 5.23
- Phil Alderman 5.16
- Pete Ellams 5.03
- Peter Carr 4.70
- Paul Embley 4.13

Exeter

- Rob Maxfield 9.09
- Nigel Boocock 8.64
- John Barker 8.50
- Martin Hewlett 6.39
- John Williams 6.26
- Arnold Haley 5.83
- Tony Garard 5.76
- Dave Brewer 4.17
- Tony Sanford 3.92
- Phil Vance 1.78

Glasgow

- Steve Lawson 10.17
- Alan Emerson 8.72
- Andy Reid 8.02
- Jim Beaton 5.84
- Charlie McKinna 5.61
- Kenny McKinna 5.36
- Colin Caffrey 5.08
- Ray Palmer 4.89
- Andy Campbell 2.83
- Steve Mildoon 1.75

Middlesbrough

- Steve Wilcock 10.28
- Mark Courtney 9.18
- Brian Havelock 7.71
- Mike Spink 7.48
- Geoff Pusey 6.98
- Martin Dixon 6.68
- Bernie Collier 4.35

Mildenhall

- Ray Bales 8.97
- Robert Henry 8.64
- Mick Bates 7.60
- Ian Gledhill 7.04
- Richard Knight 6.19
- Andy Warne 5.33
- Mark Bilner 5.24
- Carl Baldwin 4.47
- Mark Baldwin 4.47

Milton Keynes

- Bob Humphreys 8.81
- Graham Plant 6.34
- Nigel Sparshott 6.06
- Andy Hibbs 5.96
- Bert Harkins 5.86
- Mick Blaynee 5.66
- Barry Allaway 4.63
- Nigel Davis 4.39
- Graham Clifton 3.56
- Robbie Vigus 3.79
- Steve Payne 2.17

Newcastle

- Rod Hunter 9.28
- Robbie Blackadder 8.54
- David Bargh 8.32
- Derek Richardson 7.61
- Nigel Crabtree 6.50
- Keith Bloxsome 6.4
- Paul Brown 2.82

Nottingham

- Mike Sampson 9.88
- Ivan Blacka 7.85
- Glenn MacDonald 7.56
- Craig Featherby 7.45
- Mark Collins 5.37
- Arthur Price 4.84
- Steve Sant 3.62
- Mark Williams 3.60
- Pete Bacon 3.43
- John Homer 2.98

Oxford

- Dave Perks 10.82
- Derek Harrison 8.75
- Bruce Cribb 7.42
- John Hack 6.87
- Colin Ackroyd 5.62
- Steve Crockett 4.68
- Mick Fletcher 4.36
- Kevin Bowen 4.29
- Mick Handley 4.00
- John Grahame 3.91
- Andy Passey 1.52

Peterborough

- Andy Hines 8.81
- Nigel Flatman 8.73
- Richard Greer 8.19
- Mick Hines 7.66
- Adrian Pepper 4.59
- Andy Fisher 4.57
- Nigel Couzens 4.41
- Andy Buck 4.32
- Ian Barney 1.58

Rye House

- Bobby Garrad 9.85
- Karl Fiala 9.45
- Kelvin Mullarkey 9.29
- Kevin Smith 8.43
- Ashley Pullen 6.84
- Peter Tarrant 5.78
- Andy Fines 4.07
- Carl Squirrell 3.03
- Barry King 2.40

Scunthorpe

- Phil White 9.07
- Arthur Browning 8.59
- Nicky Allott 7.08
- Kevin Teager 5.31
- Rob Woffinden 4.03
- John Priest 4.00
- Ian Jeffcoate 3.94
- Ian Westwell 3.88
- Graham Mortimer 2.96

Stoke

- Billy Burton 8.02
- Tony Boyle 7.26
- Paul Stead 6.47
- Les Sawyer 5.99
- Alan MacLean 5.70
- Neil Evitts 4.78
- Ian Robertson 4.64
- Rod North 4.58
- Mike Wilding 3.86
- Rob Lightfoot 3.34

Weymouth

- Martin Yeates 9.30
- Brian Woodward 7.68
- Simon Wigg 6.60
- Bob Coles 6.25
- Chris Pusey 5.94
- Malcolm Corradine 5.50
- Mark DeKok 4.93
- Terry Tulloch 4.22
- Geoff Swindells 2.78

Workington

- Ian Hindle 6.65
- Ian Robertson 5.16
- Steve Regeling 4.51
- Des Wilson 4.51
- Wayne Jackson 4.43
- Mark Dickinson 4.06
- Terry Kelly 3.68
- Chris Roynon 3.50
- Kevin Clapham 3.45
- Andy Margarson 2.76

== See also ==
- List of United Kingdom Speedway League Champions
- Knockout Cup (speedway)
