= 1981 National League season =

British motorcycle speedway season

- League: National League
- No. of competitors: 19
- Champions: Middlesbrough Tigers
- Knockout Cup: Edinburgh Monarchs
- Individual: Mike Ferreira
- Pairs: Canterbury Crusaders
- Fours: Edinburgh Monarchs
- Highest average: Mike Ferreira
- Division/s above: 1981 British League

The 1981 National League was contested as the second division/tier of Speedway in the United Kingdom.

== Summary ==
The league started with 20 teams with Nottingham Outlaws dropping out after the BSPA refused an application by promoter Maurice Jones to run during 1981. However, Wolverhampton Wolves joined having moved down from the British League. Wolves promoter Mike Parker was replaced by Dan McCormick for the 1981 season.

Berwick Bandits were forced to quit after 26 league meetings, their record being expunged. Middlesbrough Tigers comfortably won their first ever title.

Exeter Falcons rider Tony Sanford died following an accident at the County Ground Stadium on 7 September. He was racing in a match against Milton Keynes when he hit a barrier near the final bend. A memorial trophy was held in subsequent years in his memory.

== Final table ==
Pos	Team	PL	W	D	L	Pts
1	Middlesbrough Tigers	36	30	1	5	61
2	Weymouth Wildcats	36	26	1	9	53
3	Newcastle Diamonds	36	25	1	10	51
4	Edinburgh Monarchs	36	25	0	11	50
5	Glasgow Tigers	36	24	0	12	48
6	Boston Barracudas	36	22	0	14	44
7	Exeter Falcons	36	22	0	14	44
8	Mildenhall Fen Tigers	36	20	0	16	40
9	Peterborough Panthers	36	19	1	16	39
10	Crayford Kestrels	36	19	0	17	38
11	Ellesmere Port Gunners	36	18	1	17	37
12	Oxford Cheetahs	36	18	1	17	37
13	Wolverhampton Wolves	36	14	1	21	29
14	Canterbury Crusaders	36	14	1	21	29
15	Stoke Potters	36	14	0	22	28
16	Rye House Rockets	36	11	0	25	22
17	Scunthorpe Stags	36	6	1	29	13
18	Workington Comets	36	6	1	29	13
19	Milton Keynes Knights	36	4	0	32	8

== Fixtures and results ==
Home \ Away	BER	BOS	CAN	CRY	ED	EP	EX	GLA	MID	MIL	MK	NEW	OX	PET	RH	SCU	STO	WEY	WOL	WOR
Berwick		n/a	n/a	44–34	n/a	n/a	44–34	n/a	n/a	n/a	46–32	37–41	n/a	46–31	55–23	57–21	n/a	37–41	n/a	n/a
Boston	45–33		47–30	57–21	47–31	51–27	48–30	53–25	40–38	50–28	53–25	43–35	51–27	42–36	47–31	52–26	51–27	51–27	40–38	55–23
Canterbury	38–40	36–42		40–38	39–38	35–43	43–35	41–37	31–46	35–43	43–35	34–44	41–37	44–34	45–33	53–25	36–42	35–43	32–45	60–18
Crayford	42–36	44–34	47–31		37–40	47–30	54–24	40–38	25–52	50–28	44–34	39–38	42–36	43–35	55–23	60–18	39–38	40–37	51.5–26.5	63–15
Edinburgh	42–36	50.5–27.5	41–35	47–30		49–29	47–31	48–29	37–41	58–20	53–13	36–42	42–36	51–27	50–27	43–30	41–37	46–32	49–29	62–16
Ellesmere Port	44–34	40–38	48–30	56–22	45–33		51–26	37–41	30–48	55–23	60–18	50–8	39–39	43–34	51–27	57–21	52–26	37–41	55–22	63–14
Exeter	47–31	44–34	48–30	62–16	45–33	43–35		47–31	49–29	47–31	58–20	44–34	51–27	53–25	57–21	59–19	40–35	43–35	51–27	52–26
Glasgow	46–32	44–34	46–32	58–20	52–25	58–20	50–28		40–38	41–34	47–31	41–35	41–37	47–30	46–32	55–23	55–22	40–38	54.5–23.5	55–23
Middlesbrough	48–30	57–21	55–23	51–27	51–27	55–22	45–33	48–29		42–36	58–19	43–35	54–24	55–23	44–34	59–19	41–37	46–32	55–23	63–15
Mildenhall	42–36	38–40	41–37	50–28	34–44	44–34	46–32	53–25	38–40		45–33	38.5–39.5	40–38	48–28	41–37	47–31	48–30	53–25	57–20	48–30
Milton Keynes	43–35	38–40	41–37	35–43	34–44	37–41	38–40	38–40	32–46	34–44		36–42	37–41	33–45	40–38	34–41	37–40	27–51	36–42	52–26
Newcastle	45–32	45–32	44–34	55–23	44–34	58–20	50–27	51–27	39–39	60–18	53–24		49–29	50–28	52–26	54–24	47–31	44–34	42–36	53–25
Oxford	44–34	42–36	37–40	44–34	43–35	46–30	41–37	42–36	33–45	35–43	49–29	36–42		42–36	43–35	43–35	44–34	34–43	44–34	62–15
Peterborough	40–38	52–26	44–33	54–24	34–44	44–34	43–35	48–30	48–29	44–34	56–22	43–35	52–26		42–36	47–31	54–24	45–33	44–33	58–20
Rye House	42–36	42–35	48–30	43–35	33–44	45–33	34–44	31–46	37–41	38–39	51–27	45–33	37–41	59–19		55–22	41–36	34–44	37–41	63–15
Scunthorpe	n/a	24–54	38–40	36–42	35–43	42–36	35–43	44–34	31–47	40–38	49–29	38–40	34–43	39–39	28–49		31–47	26–52	33–45	44–33
Stoke	42–36	43–35	38–40	35–39	38–40	37–41	40–37	37–41	23–54	28–50	48–30	40–38	41–37	37–4`	48–30	56–22		37–41	45–33	57–21
Weymouth	42–36	49–29	44–34	43–35	40–38	52–26	50–28	51–27	45–33	54–24	56–22	48–30	44–34	47–31	54–24	47–31	53–25		39–39	63–15
Wolverhampton	45–32	42–36	36–42	48–29	35–43	44–34	46–32	32–45	28–50	48–30	41–37	31–46	36–39	44–34	55–23	60–18	38–40	37–41		51–27
Workington	32–45	46–32	39–39	41–35	29–49	36–42	36–42	28–49	24–54	33–45	36–42	36–40	37–41	42–36	49–29	47–31	34–44	36–42	41–36	

Legend: Blue = home team win; Yellow = draw; Red = away team win.

== National League Knockout Cup ==
The 1981 National League Knockout Cup was the 14th edition of the Knockout Cup for tier two teams. Edinburgh Monarchs were the winners of the competition.

First round

Date	Team one	Score	Team two
29/03	Mildenhall	58-38	Canterbury
04/04	Canterbury	52-44	Mildenhall
17/04	Ellesmere Port	47-49	Wolverhampton
19/04	Wolverhampton	43-53	Ellesmere Port
23/04	Middlesbrough	69-27	Glasgow
29/05	Glasgow	55-40	Middlesbrough
11/04	Stoke	51-45	Milton Keynes
07/04	Milton Keynes	38-58	Stoke

Second round

Date	Team one	Score	Team two
29/05	Edinburgh	65-31	Exeter
01/06	Exeter	56-40	Edinburgh
04/06	Oxford	59-34	Scunthorpe
01/06	Scunthorpe	46-49	Oxford
07/06	Mildenhall	76-20	Ellesmere Port
29/05	Ellesmere Port	30-64	Mildenhall
29/05	Peterborough	70-26	Rye House
07/06	Rye House	32-64	Peterborough
06/06	Berwick	53-42	Newcastle
08/06	Newcastle	52-44	Berwick
09/06	Weymouth	74-20	Workington
29/05	Workington	31-59	Weymouth
07/06	Boston	69-27	Crayford
02/06	Crayford	42-51	Boston
07/06	Middlesbrough	55-41	Stoke
06/06	Stoke	48-48	Middlesbrough

Quarter-finals

Date	Team one	Score	Team two
14/08	Edinburgh	65-31	Oxford
13/08	Oxford	41-54	Edinburgh
05/07	Mildenhall	61-35	Peterborough
26/06	Peterborough	49-47	Mildenhall
17/07	Berwick	51-45	Weymouth
14/07	Weymouth	48-48	Berwick
02/08	Boston	57-39	Middlesbrough
?	Middlesbrough	45-51	Boston

Semi-finals

Date	Team one	Score	Team two
27/09	Edinburgh	64-32	Mildenhall
11/09	Mildenhall	46-50	Edinburgh
14/10	Berwick	64-32	Boston
27/09	Boston	58½-37½	Berwick

=== Final ===
First leg

21 October 1981

Berwick Bandits Steve McDermott 13 Wayne Brown 11 Mike Caroline 9 Rob Grant 6 Brett Saunders 5 Brian Collins 3 Jim Beaton 2	49 – 46	Edinburgh Monarchs Dave Trownson 10 Neil Collins 9 Ivan Blacka 9 Chris Turner 8 George Hunter 7 Scott Robson 3 Ian Westwell 0

Brough Park

Second leg

6 November 1980

Edinburgh Monarchs George Hunter 13 Dave Trownson 11 Ivan Blacka 11 Neil Collins 7 Chris Turner 7 Roger Lambert 6 Ian Westwell 0	55 – 40	Berwick Bandits Charlie McKinna (guest) 14 Steve McDermott 9 Mike Caroline 7 Rob Grant 5 Brett Saunders 3 Brian Collins 2 Jim Beaton 0

Powderhall Stadium

Edinburgh were declared Knockout Cup Champions, winning on aggregate 101–89.

== Riders' Championship ==
Mike Ferreira won the Riders' Championship, held at Wimbledon Stadium on 26 September 1981.

Pos.	Rider	Pts	Total
1	(Zimbabwe) Mike Ferreira	3 3 3 3 3	15
2	(England) Simon Wigg	1 3 3 3 3	13
3	(New Zealand) Bruce Cribb	3 3 2 0 3	11
4	(England) Dave Perks	3 1 2 2 2	10
5	(England) Neil Collins	2 3 2 2 1	10
6	(England) Steve Wilcock	2 2 1 2 2	9
7	(England) Steve Lawson	2 0 3 3	8
8	(England) Barry Thomas	2 0 3 2 1	8
9	(England) Kelvin Mullarkey	0 2 1 3 2	8
10	(England) Steve Finch	0 2 2 1	6
11	(New Zealand) Wayne Brown	3 2	5
12	(England) Ian Gledhill	0 2 1 1	4
13	(England) Rob Maxfield	1 1 1 1 0	4
14	(England) David Gagen	2 0 1 0	3
15	(New Zealand) David Bargh	1 1 1 0	3
16	(Australia) Bob Humphreys	1 0 0	1
17	(England) John Barclay	1	1
18	(England) Neville Moore	0	0

- f=fell, r-retired, ex=excluded, ef=engine failure

== Pairs ==
The National League Pairs was held at The Shay on 18 July and was won by Canterbury Crusaders.

Group A
Pos	Team	Pts	Riders
1	Mildenhall	13	Gledhill 9 Bales 4
2	Middlesbrough	11	Wilcock 8 Dixon 3
3	Rye House	6	Mullarkey 6 Naylor 0
4	Edinburgh	5	Turner 4 Collins N 1

Group B
Pos	Team	Pts	Riders
1	Wolverhampton	13	Cribb 8 Evitts 5
2	Glasgow	10	Lawson 8 McKinna 2
3	Oxford	7	Perks 5 Harrison 2
4	Peterborough	6	Greer 6 Buck 0

Group C
Pos	Team	Pts	Riders
1	Berwick	11	Brown 9 McDermott 2
2	Newcastle	11	Hunter 7 Bargh 4
3	Weymouth	8	Yeates 5 Wigg 3
4	Exeter	6	Maxfield 6 Hewlett 0

Group D
Pos	Team	Pts	Riders
1	Canterbury	12	Ferreira 9 Kent 5
2	Crayford	12	Thomas 7 Sage 5
3	Boston	7	Gagen 4 Lomas 3
4	Ellesmere P	3	Jackson 2 Finch 1

Semi finals

- Canterbury bt Wolverhampton
- Berwick bt Mildenhall

Final

- Canterbury bt Berwick

== Fours ==
Edinburgh Monarchs won the fours championship final, held at the East of England Arena on 26 July.

Semi finals

- SF1 = Wolverhampton 16, Edinburgh 16, Mildenhall 13, Crayford 3
- SF2 = Middlesbrough 16, Newcastle 16, Peterborough 11, Weymouth 4

Final

Pos	Team	Pts	Riders
1	Edinburgh Monarchs	15	Turner 4, Collins 4, Trownson 4, Blacka 3
2	Newcastle Diamonds	13	Bargh 5, Emerson 3, Hunter 3, Blackadder 2
3	Middlesbrough Tigers	11	Courtney 5, Pusey 3, Wilcock 2, Havelock 1
4	Wolverhampton Wolves	9	Burton 5, Evitts 2, Stead 2, Cribb 0

== Leading final averages ==
	Rider	Nat	Team	C.M.A.
1	Mike Ferreira	(Zimbabwe)	Canterbury Crusaders	10.87
2	Steve Lawson	(England)	Glasgow Tigers	10.55
3	Mark Courtney	(England)	Middlesbrough Tigers	10.44
4	Les Rumsey	(England)	Weymouth	10.19
5	Dave Perks	(England)	Oxford Cheetahs	10.13

== Riders & final averages ==
Berwick (withdrew from league)

- Wayne Brown 9.24
- Steve McDermott 8.40
- Rob Grant Sr. 6.95
- Mike Caroline 5.94
- Brian Collins 5.38
- Brett Saunders 5.05
- Roger Wright 4.92
- Graham Jones 4.61
- Jim Beaton 4.00
- Ian Anderson 1.26

Boston

- David Gagen 8.84
- Steve Lomas 8.84
- Steve Regeling 8.47
- Rob Hollingworth 8.45
- Dennis Mallett 6.35
- Mike Spinks 5.95
- Michael Holding 5.23
- Keven Dye 4.31
- Chris Cole 3.45

Canterbury

- Mike Ferreira 10.87
- Denzil Kent 7.75
- Barney Kennett 6.81
- Mark Martin 4.69
- Darryl Simpson 4.43
- Kevin Brice 4.21
- Brendan Shiletto 4.07
- Jamie Luckhurst 3.78
- Rob Dolman 3.30
- Graham Knowler 2.67

Crayford

- Barry Thomas 9.02
- Alan Sage 7.88
- Laurie Etheridge 6.90
- Mike Pither 5.72
- Trevor Barnwell 5.70
- Mike Spinks 4.83
- Paul Hollingsbee 4.47
- Keith Pritchard 4.15
- Paul Bosley 2.24

Edinburgh

- Neil Collins 9.68
- Dave Trownson 8.57
- George Hunter 8.45
- Chris Turner 7.49
- Ivan Blacka 7.07
- Benny Rourke 5.85
- Roger Lambert 5.27
- Guy Robson 2.77
- Ian Westwell 2.27

Ellesmere Port

- Billy Burton 8.63
- Steve Finch 8.14
- Peter Carr 7.49
- John Jackson 7.34
- Rob Ashton 6.51
- Phil Alderman 5.98
- Eric Monaghan 5.98
- Paul Embley 4.81
- Paul Price 3.11
- Andrew Reeves 1.68

Exeter

- Rob Maxfield 9.07
- Bob Coles 8.24
- Martin Hewlett 8.10
- John Barker 7.85
- Les Sawyer 7.68
- Andy Campbell 6.53
- Keith Wright 6.00
- John Williams 5.99
- Keith Millard 4.30
- Tony Sanford 3.20

Glasgow

- Steve Lawson 10.55
- Charlie McKinna 8.04
- Kenny McKinna 7.57
- Nigel Close 7.08
- Harry Maclean 6.02
- Colin Caffrey 5.80
- Andy Reid 5.52
- Ray Palmer 4.44
- Alan Mason 2.74

Middlesbrough

- Mark Courtney 10.44
- Steve Wilcock 9.95
- Martin Dixon 8.28
- Brian Havelock 7.20
- Mike Spink 7.18
- Geoff Pusey 6.71
- Bernie Collier 5.05
- Peter Tarrant 3.60
- Alan Armstrong 3.54

Mildenhall

- Robert Henry 8.59
- Ray Bales 8.35
- Mick Bates 8.25
- Ian Gledhill 7.89
- Richard Knight 7.24
- Carl Baldwin 4.48
- Andy Warne 3.78
- Mark Bilner 3.73
- Carl Blackbird 2.77

Milton Keynes

- Bob Humphreys 9.14
- Graham Plant 6.38
- Andy Hibbs 6.00
- Mick Blaynee 4.77
- Barry Allaway 4.41
- Mark Baldwin 4.36
- Steve Payne 4.30
- Nigel Davis 4.20
- Brett Alderton 4.15

Newcastle

- David Bargh 9.04
- Rod Hunter 8.68
- Robbie Blackadder 8.40
- Alan Emerson 8.07
- Keith Bloxsome 6.87
- Glenn MacDonald 5.54
- Kym Mauger 2.92

Oxford

- Dave Perks 10.13
- Derek Harrison 9.40
- Colin Ackroyd 8.12
- Paul Evitts 5.31
- Arthur Price 4.51
- John Grahame 4.14
- Mick Handley .4.04
- Mick Fletcher 3.94
- Alan MacLean 1.44

Peterborough

- Richard Greer 8.20
- Andy Hines 8.04
- Dave Allen 7.69
- Mick Hines 7.58
- Andy Fisher 6.08
- Nigel Couzens 5.97
- Andy Buck 5.32
- Ian Barney 4.91

Rye House

- Bobby Garrad 8.85
- Kelvin Mullarkey 8.27
- Steve Naylor 7.67
- Kevin Bowen 5.05
- Peter Johns 4.71
- Peter Tarrant 4.62
- Marvyn Cox 4.57
- Garry Monk 4.51
- Barry King 4.20
- Tony Garard 2.18

Scunthorpe

- Kevin Teager 7.56
- Nicky Allott 7.51
- Mark DeKok 5.71
- Tony Featherstone 5.33
- Rob Woffinden 5.19
- Tony Childs 3.62
- Graeme Beardsley 3.45
- Julian Parr 2.99
- Phil Kynman 2.73

Stoke

- Pete Smith 8.28
- Mike Sampson 7.97
- Arthur Browning 6.68
- Rob Lightfoot 6.55
- Mark Collins 6.29
- Rod North 6.11
- Steve Sant 6.06
- Ian Robertson 3.87

Weymouth

- Les Rumsey 10.19
- Martin Yeates 10.12
- Simon Wigg 10.07
- Brian Woodward 7.11
- Malcolm Shakespeare 7.02
- Terry Tulloch 5.91
- Steve Crockett 5.68
- Steve Schofield 5.64
- Bob Coles 5.22

Wolverhampton

- Bruce Cribb 9.99
- Les Rumsey 8.77
- Neil Evitts 7.80
- Billy Burton 6.74
- Tony Boyle 5.95
- Paul Stead 5.51
- Mike Wilding 4.11
- Rob Carter 3.55
- John Hough 3.49
- Steve Crockett 1.41

Workington

- Terry Kelly 6.97
- Wayne Jackson 6.22
- Mark Dickinson 5.67
- Guy Wilson 4.47
- Des Wilson 4.42
- Kevin Clapham 3.67
- David Blackburn 3.51
- John Frankland 2.69
- Michael Irving 0.89

== See also ==
- List of United Kingdom Speedway League Champions
- Knockout Cup (speedway)
