= 1982 National League season =

British motorcycle speedway season

- League: National League
- No. of competitors: 19
- Champions: Newcastle Diamonds
- Knockout Cup: Newcastle Diamonds
- Individual: Joe Owen
- Pairs: Weymouth Wildcats
- Fours: Newcastle Diamonds
- Highest average: Joe Owen
- Division/s above: 1982 British League

In 1982 the National League, also known as British League Division Two, was the second tier of speedway racing in the United Kingdom.

== Summary ==
Long Eaton Invaders replaced Workington Comets, after the latter withdrew from the league before the start of the season. Wolverhampton Wolves were unable to form a team and would not race for two seasons.

The league champions were Newcastle Diamonds.

Milton Keynes rider Brett Alderton was killed in an accident during the second half of a league meeting at King's Lynn. The 18-year old Australian sustained a fatal head injury on 17 April.

== Final table ==
Pos	Team	PL	W	D	L	Pts
1	Newcastle Diamonds	36	30	0	6	60
2	Mildenhall Fen Tigers	36	26	1	9	53
3	Ellesmere Port Gunners	36	25	0	11	50
4	Middlesbrough Tigers	36	24	1	11	49
5	Weymouth Wildcats	36	22	1	13	45
6	Rye House Rockets	36	22	0	14	44
7	Long Eaton Invaders	36	20	1	15	41
8	Boston Barracudas	36	19	1	16	39
9	Berwick Bandits	36	18	1	17	37
10	Exeter Falcons	36	17	0	19	34
11	Glasgow Tigers	36	16	0	20	32
12	Milton Keynes Knights	36	14	1	21	29
13	Peterborough Panthers	36	13	2	21	28
14	Edinburgh Monarchs	36	14	0	22	28
15	Crayford Kestrels	36	13	0	23	26
16	Canterbury Crusaders	36	12	1	23	25
17	Scunthorpe Stags	36	11	2	23	24
18	Stoke Potters	36	11	1	24	23
19	Oxford Cheetahs	36	7	3	26	17

== Fixtures and results ==
Home \ Away	BER	BOS	CAN	CRY	ED	EP	EX	GLA	LE	MID	MIL	MK	NEW	OX	PET	RH	SCU	STO	WEY
Berwick		55–41	64–32	55–40	63–33	43–53	65–31	54–42	73–23	42–53	67–29	55–40	50–45	72–24	61–35	64–31	63–33	55–40	47–49
Boston	53–40		57–39	66–30	59–37	47–49	64–32	57–39	47–48	49–47	49–47	62–34	50–46	66–30	50–46	50–46	60–36	61–35	58–38
Canterbury	41–55	62–34		52–43	44–52	47–49	53–43	62–34	52–44	48–48	45–51	49–45	38–58	36–60	49–47	53–43	57–39	53–43	42–53
Crayford	55–41	49–46	45–51		53–43	69–26	49–47	56–38	46–50	41–54	46–50	76–20	43–52	65–29	51–44	47–49	55–41	70–26	58–37
Edinburgh	43–53	44–52	52–41	50–45		54–42	53–41	51–44	47–49	52–44	34–62	46–50	51–45	73–23	53–42	44–51	41–47	57–39	52–44
Ellesmere Port	61–35	60–36	56–40	68–28	57–39		57–39	70–26	58–38	67–29	46–50	58–38	51–45	60–36	55–41	59–37	71–25	57–39	58–38
Exeter	55–41	57–39	57–39	66–30	59–37	58–38		73–23	52.5–43.5	52–44	45–51	58–38	45–50	67–28	64–32	34–19	51–45	61–35	52–44
Glasgow	53–43	53–43	60–36	46–49	51–44	50–46	52–43		63–32	55–40	52–44	50–42	38–58	50–45	50–46	54–41	62–34	64–31	51–45
Long Eaton	60–36	47–49	52–44	59–37	60–36	58–38	61–35	63–33		63–33	52–44	60–36	40–6	70–26	61–35	47–49	68–28	57–38	61–35
Middlesbrough	62–34	56–39	56–39	56–40	58–35	56–40	70–26	59–37	51–45		55–41	71–25	44–52	67–29	60–36	57–39	64–32	54–42	57–39
Mildenhall	72–24	53–43	57–38	72–24	66–30	55–41	74–22	68–28	60–36	60–35		60–36	49–47	63–33	62–34	61–35	62–34	75–21	61–35
Milton Keynes	53–42	55–41	39–57	62–34	43–53	47–48	50–45	56–40	51–45	44–52	47–49		42–53	58–37	50–46	52–43	49–46	59–37	49–47
Newcastle	60–36	63–33	71–25	72–24	59–37	70–26	61–35	69–27	55–41	66–30	61–35	63–33		74–22	72–24	67–28	64–32	52–44	66–30
Oxford	50–46	39–57	49–46	50–45	47–48	45–51	47–48	53–43	48–48	47–49	43–53	48–48	32–64		48–48	47–49	44–51	55–41	45–51
Peterborough	56–40	53–43	54–42	64–32	50–44	47–49	55–41	64–32	51–45	46–50	48–48	62–34	41–55	56–40		54–42	60–36	53–42	34–62
Rye House	64–32	59–37	55–40	64–31	57–38	56–40	61–34	63–33	52–43	53–41	49–47	54–41	49–37	64–32	52–44		58–38	73–23	54–41
Scunthorpe	48–48	48–48	58–37	57–39	49–47	44–52	59–37	63–33	39–57	43–53	50–46	47–49	40–56	50–46	50–46	51–45		47–49	41–55
Stoke	43–53	49–47	49–47	50–45	54–42	45–51	61–35	49–47	37–48	46–50	44–52	54–42	35–61	31–64	50–46	53–42	55–40		48–48
Weymouth	59–37	53–43	61–35	61–35	57–39	56–40	62–34	56–39	56–40	61–35	58–38	55–41	45–51	62–34	53–43	59–37	52–44	64–32	

Legend: Blue = home team win; Yellow = draw; Red = away team win.

== Top five riders (league averages) ==
	Rider	Nat	Team	C.M.A.
1	Joe Owen	(England)	Newcastle	11.09
2	Simon Wigg	(England)	Weymouth	10.67
3	Steve Lawson	(England)	Glasgow	10.40
4	Rod Hunter	(Australia)	Newcastle	10.22
5	Bob Garrad	(England)	Rye House	9.86

== National League Knockout Cup ==
The 1982 National League Knockout Cup was the 15th edition of the Knockout Cup for tier two teams. Newcastle Diamonds were the winners of the competition.

First round

Date	Team one	Score	Team two
11/05	Milton Keynes	47-49	Oxford
06/05	Oxford	54-42	Milton Keynes
27/04	Weymouth	60-36	Canterbury
24/04	Canterbury	54-42	Weymouth

Second round

Date	Team one	Score	Team two
24/06	Oxford	39-56	Mildenhall
07/06	Scunthorpe	51-45	Peterborough
31/05	Rye House	35-25	Crayford
31/05	Long Eaton	67-29	Berwick
29/05	Berwick	67-29	Long Eaton
26/05	Edinburgh	53-43	Ellesmere Port
26/05	Mildenhall	62-34	Oxford
25/05	Crayford	33-62	Rye House
24/05	Newcastle	55-41	Middlesbrough
23/05	Boston	59-37	Stoke
22/05	Stoke	42-54	Boston
21/05	Ellesmere Port	60-36	Edinburgh
21/05	Peterborough	58-38	Scunthorpe
20/05	Middlesbrough	53-43	Newcastle
18/05	Weymouth	62-34	Exeter
17/05	Exeter	60-36	Weymouth
30/06 replay	Long Eaton	62-34	Berwick
06/06 replay	Berwick	67-29	Long Eaton

Quarter-finals

Date	Team one	Score	Team two
07/08	Berwick	64-32	Ellesmere Port
30/07	Ellesmere Port	69-26	Berwick
29/07	Weymouth	53-43	Peterborough
26/07	Newcastle	62-34	Boston
18/07	Boston	47-49	Newcastle
11/07	Rye House	60-35	Mildenhall
10/07	Mildenhall	56-39	Rye House
02/07	Peterborough	48-48	Weymouth

Semi-finals

Date	Team one	Score	Team two
05/09	Rye House	59-37	Ellesmere Port
31/08	Weymouth	35-61	Newcastle
20/08	Ellesmere Port	71-25	Rye House
16/08	Newcastle	63-32	Weymouth

=== Final ===
First leg

10 October 1982

Ellesmere Port Gunners John Jackson 13 Steve Finch 12 Eric Monaghan 11 Phil Alderman 6 Rob Maxfield 4 Billy Burton 4 Glen Parrott 1	51 – 45	Newcastle Diamonds Joe Owen 15 Rod Hunter 14 Bobby Beaton 8 Tom Owen 5 Keith Bloxsome 2 Alan Emerson 1 Robbie Foy 0

Ellesmere Port Stadium

Second leg

11 October 1982

Newcastle Diamonds Joe Owen 15 Rod Hunter 14 Alan Emerson 12 Tom Owen 11 Keith Bloxsome 11 Bobby Beaton 10 Robbie Foy 0	73 – 23	Ellesmere Port Gunners Eric Monaghan 7 Steve Finch 5 John Jackson 3 Phil Alderman 3 Billy Burton 2 Glen Parrott 2 Rob Maxfield 1

Brough Park

Newcastle were declared Knockout Cup Champions, winning on aggregate 118–74.

== Riders' Championship ==
Joe Owen won the Riders' Championship, sponsored by the Daily Mirror and held at Wimbledon Stadium on 18 September 1982.

Pos.	Rider	Pts	Total
1	(England) Joe Owen	3 3 3 3 2	14
2	(England) Steve Lomas	3 3 3 3	12
3	(England) Bob Garrad	1 3 2 3 2	11
4	(England) Andy Hines	2 3 2 3	10
5	(England) Keith White	0 1 2 3 3	9
6	(England) Derek Harrison	2 3 2 1 1	9
7	(England) Steve Lawson	2 0 1 2 3	8
8	(England) Andy Campbell	1 2 3 1 1	8
9	(England) Dave Trownson	0 2 1 2 2	7
10	(England) Alan Molyneux	2 2 2 0	6
11	(England) Martin Yeates	3 0 0 0 2	5
12	(England) Barry Thomas	3 0 1 1 0	5
13	(England) Steve Wilcock	3 1 1 0	5
14	(England) Barney Kennett	1 1 2 0 1	5
15	(England) John Jackson	2 1 0 1 0	4
16	(England) Steve McDermott	1 0 0 1	2

== Pairs ==
The National League Pairs were held in Swindon on 28 August and was won by Weymouth Wildcats.

Group A
Pos	Team	Pts	Riders
1	Weymouth	15	Yeates 8 Wigg 7
2	Boston	8	Hollingworth 6 Lomas 2
3	Glasgow	7	Lawson 4 McKinna 3
4	Crayford	6	Thomas 3 Sage 3

Group B
Pos	Team	Pts	Riders
1	Newcastle	15	Hunter 9 Owen J 6
2	Mildenhall	9	Bales 5 Harrison 4
3	Peterborough	9	Allen 5 Hines 4
4	Berwick	0	McDermott 0 Cribb 0

Group C
Pos	Team	Pts	Riders
1	Middlesbrough	11	Dixon 9 Wilcock 2
2	Milton K	11	Featherby 8 White 3
3	Ellesmere P	8	Jackson 5 Finch 3
4	Canterbury	6	Kennett 5 Clark 1

Group D
Pos	Team	Pts	Riders
1	Long Eaton	13	Perks 8 Molyneux 5
2	Rye House	11	Garrad 6 Cox 5
3	Exeter	7	Campbell 5 Millard 2
4	Edinburgh	5	Trownson 5 Blacka 0

Semi finals

- Weymouth bt Middlesbrough
- Long Eaton bt Newcastle

Final

- Weymouth bt Long Eaton

== Fours ==
Newcastle Diamonds won the fours championship final, held at the East of England Arena on 25 July.

Semi finals

- SF1 = Newcastle 16, Middlesbrough 12, Ellesmere Port 10, Peterborough 10
- SF2 = Mildenhall 15, Rye House 14, Oxford 12, Exeter 7

Final

Pos	Team	Pts	Riders
1	Newcastle	17	Owen 6, Beaton 4, Hunter 4, Emerson 3
2	Mildenhall	15	Henry 5, Knight 5, Bales 4, Harrison 1
3	Middlesbrough	13	Dixon 5, Wilcock 4, Pusey 2, Spink 2
4	Rye House	3	Mullarkey 2, Naylor 1, Garrad 0, Bryenton 0

== Leading final averages ==
	Rider	Nat	Team	C.M.A.
1	Joe Owen	(England)	Newcastle	11.01
2	Steve Lawson	(England)	Glasgow	10.40
3	Simon Wigg	(England)	Weymouth	10.36
4	Rod Hunter	(Australia)	Newcastle	10.12
5	Bob Garrad	(England)	Rye House	9.85

== Riders & final averages ==
Berwick

- Steve McDermott 8.83
- Bruce Cribb 7.85
- Brian Collins 7.24
- George Hunter 7.23
- Paul Thorp 6.47
- Rob Grant Sr. 6.12
- Mike Caroline 5.45
- Rob Carter 2.75

Boston

- Steve Lomas 9.17
- David Gagen 9.09
- Rob Hollingworth 8.86
- Dennis Mallett 5.94
- David Blackburn 4.71
- Guy Wilson 4.68
- Peter Framingham 4.19
- Robbie McGregor 3.60
- Chris Cole 2.97

Canterbury

- Barney Kennett 8.66
- Denzil Kent 7.74
- Ian Clark 7.64
- Darryl Simpson 5.18
- Keith Pritchard 4.46
- Kevin Brice 4.36
- Nigel Couzens 4.36
- Mark Martin 3.74

Crayford

- Barry Thomas 8.75
- Trevor Banks 7.62
- Mike Spinks 6.83
- Alan Sage 6.48
- Alan Mogridge 5.96
- Laurie Etheridge 5.67
- Paul Bosley 5.22
- Mike Pither 5.02
- Trevor Barnwell 3.53
- Chris Tritton 3.23
- Andy Galvin 2.40

Edinburgh

- Dave Trownson 9.21
- Eric Broadbelt 7.05
- Brett Saunders 7.03
- Ivan Blacka 6.54
- Benny Rourke 6.00
- Chris Turner 5.95
- Mark Fiora 5.69
- Roger Lambert 4.36
- Ian Westwell 2.87
- Sean Courtney 2.53

Ellesmere Port

- John Jackson 9.15
- Steve Finch 8.56
- Rob Maxfield 7.26
- Eric Monaghan 6.97
- Phil Alderman 5.98
- Billy Burton 5.98
- Glen Parrott 4.91
- Rob Tate 4.63

Exeter

- John Barker 9.07
- Les Sawyer 8.56
- Andy Campbell 8.38
- Keith Millard 8.18
- Bob Coles 6.54
- Keith Wright 4.67
- Steve Bishop 4.37
- Mike Semmonds 3.72
- Dave Brewer 3.43

Glasgow

- Steve Lawson 10.40
- Kenny McKinna 8.78
- Colin Caffrey 5.92
- Harry Maclean 4.53
- Rob Carter .86
- Kym Mauger 3.67
- Alan Mason 3.65
- Martin McKinna 2.64
- Des Wilson 1.71

Long Eaton

- Alan Molyneux 9.35
- Paul Stead 8.41
- Dave Perks 7.94
- Nigel Close 6.63
- Paul Evitts 6.46
- Nicky Allott 6.20
- Mark Summerfield 5.03
- David Blackburn 4.56

Middlesbrough

- Martin Dixon 9.39
- Steve Wilcock 9.27
- Mike Spink 7.67
- Geoff Pusey 7.34
- Paul Price 5.21
- Rob Woffinden 4.86
- Alan Armstrong 4.33
- Peter Spink 3.61
- Bernie Collier 1.64

Mildenhall

- Derek Harrison 9.33
- Ray Bales 8.78
- Richard Knight 8.32
- Mick Bates 7.65
- Robert Henry 7.62
- Carl Baldwin 7.59
- Andy Warne 4.48
- Carl Blackbird 4.44

Milton Keynes

- Keith White 8.09
- Andy Hibbs 8.00
- Craig Featherby 7.25
- Nigel Sparshott 7.03
- Steve Payne 6.29
- Tony Featherstone 5.60
- Paul Clarke 4.08

Newcastle

- Joe Owen 11.01
- Rod Hunter 10.12
- Bobby Beaton 9.01
- Alan Emerson 7.81
- Keith Bloxsome 7.35
- Tom Owen 7.12
- Robbie Foy 3.65
- Barry Shearer 1.47

Oxford

- Ashley Pullen 7.73
- Graham Drury 7.54
- Colin Ackroyd 7.42
- Simon Cross 6.88
- Kevin Smart 5.13
- Wayne Jackson 5.10
- Brian Woodward 4.83
- John Frankland 4.50
- Gary Chessell 3.90
- Bill Barrett 3.14
- Mick Handley 3.06
- Mick Fletcher 2.15

Peterborough

- Andy Hines 8.64
- Dave Allen 8.26
- Mick Hines 7.33
- Andy Buck 6.38
- Andy Fisher 5.49
- Ian Barney 5.38
- Neil Cotton 3.06

Rye House

- Bobby Garrad 9.85
- Marvyn Cox 8.87
- Kelvin Mullarkey 7.78
- Steve Naylor 7.72
- Peter Johns 4.95
- Andy Fines 4.68
- Steve Bryenton 4.31
- Garry Monk 3.04

Scunthorpe

- Mike Wilding 7.88
- Kevin Teager 7.18
- Nigel Crabtree 7.07
- Rob Woffinden 5.97
- Derek Richardson 5.74
- Julian Parr 5.45
- Terry Kelly 5.11
- Ian Gibson 4.13
- Mark DeKok 4.09

Stoke

- Rod North 7.24
- Pete Smith 6.91
- Mark Collins 6.53
- Mike Sampson 6.05
- Ian Robertson 6.01
- Brian Havelock 5.69
- Arthur Browning 5.36
- Pete Ellams 5.31
- Jim Burdfield 4.41
- Steve Sant 3.32

Weymouth

- Simon Wigg 10.36
- Martin Yeates 8.46
- Steve Schofield 7.10
- Terry Tulloch 6.72
- Les Rumsey 6.39
- Stan Bear 6.00
- John McNeill 5.69
- Steve Crockett 3.56
- Mark Minett 2.86
- Rob Mather 2.85

== See also ==
- List of United Kingdom Speedway League Champions
- Knockout Cup (speedway)
