= 1983 National League season =

British motorcycle speedway season

- League: National League
- No. of competitors: 18
- Champions: Newcastle Diamonds
- Knockout Cup: Exeter Falcons
- Individual: Steve McDermott
- Pairs: Weymouth Wildcats
- Fours: Newcastle Diamonds
- Highest average: Joe Owen
- Division/s above: 1983 British League

The 1983 National League was the second tier of motorcycle speedway racing in the United Kingdom.

== Summary ==
Ellesmere Port Gunners dropped out of the league despite reaching the previous season's KO Cup final and assurances by promoter Richard Park that the team would continue racing at Thornton Road amidst rising costs.

The winning team was Newcastle Diamonds.

After the tragedy of losing a rider the previous season Milton Keynes endured a second loss when their rider Craig Featherby was killed in a crash at Peterborough in a National League match on 16 September. Featherby hit a lamp standard after being thrown from the bike.

== Final table ==
Pos	Team	PL	W	D	L	Pts
1	Newcastle Diamonds	34	25	1	8	51
2	Mildenhall Fen Tigers	34	23	2	9	48
3	Crayford Kestrels	34	23	0	11	46
4	Weymouth Wildcats	34	19	2	13	40
5	Scunthorpe Stags	34	19	2	13	40
6	Milton Keynes Knights	34	19	1	14	39
7	Middlesbrough Tigers	34	18	3	13	39
8	Berwick Bandits	34	17	0	17	34
9	Edinburgh Monarchs	34	16	1	17	33
10	Exeter Falcons	34	16	0	18	32
11	Rye House Rockets	34	15	1	18	31
12	Peterborough Panthers	34	14	2	18	30
13	Glasgow Tigers	34	14	1	19	29
14	Oxford Cheetahs	34	14	1	19	29
15	Canterbury Crusaders	34	12	2	20	26
16	Boston Barracudas	34	12	1	21	25
17	Stoke Potters	34	10	1	23	21
18	Long Eaton Invaders	34	9	1	24	19

== Fixtures and results ==
Home \ Away	BER	BOS	CAN	CRY	ED	EX	GLA	LE	MID	MIL	MK	NEW	OX	PET	RH	SCU	STO	WEY
Berwick		55–41	55–41	44–52	62–34	51–45	55–41	53–43	51–45	57–39	61–34	50–46	65–31	60–36	57–39	52–44	54–42	53–43
Boston	50–46		59–37	61–35	54–42	39.5–36.5	50–46	50–46	50–46	48–48	36–60	44–52	46–50	49–47	50–45	44–52	49–47	49–47
Canterbury	50–46	56–40		47–48	55–41	46–50	59–37	51–45	56–40	43–53	45–51	49–47	49–44	55–41	58–37	48–48	67–29	52–43
Crayford	58–38	75–21	61–34		59–37	62–34	59–36	71–25	60–36	60–36	64–32	58–38	61–35	66–30	50–44	52–44	73–23	54–42
Edinburgh	57–38	74–22	57–39	46–50		61–35	48–48	50–46	66–30	49–47	49–47	34–62	72–23	59–37	53–43	59–36	64–31	50–46
Exeter	46–49	68–28	70–25	56–39	53–43		54–42	67–29	64–32	45–51	50–46	54–42	64–31	74–22	55–41	55–41	62–34	61–35
Glasgow	49–47	64–32	57–37	47–49	67–29	55–41		68–28	46–50	50–46	61–35	50–45	51–45	49–45	59–37	65–31	59–37	46–50
Long Eaton	51–45	54–42	68–28	39–57	42–54	49–47	53–42		53–42	42–54	37–59	46–50	48–48	57–39	47–49	54–41	54–42	41–55
Middlesbrough	64–32	63–33	48–48	50–46	54–41	56–40	55–40	51–45		63–33	48–48	51–45	56–40	60–36	56–40	52–44	56–39	52–44
Mildenhall	53–42	59–37	53–43	62–34	59–37	60–36	54–42	58–25	53–43		51–44	49–47	53–43	58–38	55–40	55–40	59–37	51–44
Milton Keynes	61–35	60–35	50–46	53.5–42.5	55–41	58–38	52–44	63–33	59–37	47–49		43–53	57–39	55–41	51–44	52–43	66–30	49–47
Newcastle	57–39	61–33	49–47	54–41	66–30	63–33	62–34	56–40	57–39	49–46	64–32		63–33	60–36	50–45	55–41	54–42	56–40
Oxford	53–43	49–47	53–43	53–43	41–55	52–44	49–47	53–43	51–45	46–50	56–40	47–49		50–46	49–47	51–45	55–41	43–53
Peterborough	61–35	60–36	53–43	51–45	56–39	67–29	63–33	49–47	48–48	51–45	64–32	47–49	51–45		60–36	52–44	65–31	47–49
Rye House	52–44	58–38	59–37	49–46	54–42	60–35	58–36	62–34	47–49	51–45	59–36	45–51	54–42	64–32		48–48	59–34	55–40
Scunthorpe	55–41	56–40	56–39	49–47	68–21	56–40	51–44	59–36	49–47	50–45	58.5–37.5	49–47	50–46	61–35	56–40		58–38	54–42
Stoke	49–47	68–28	60–36	46–50	63–33	53–43	55–41	48–47	42–53	45–51	59–37	47–49	55–41	48–48	50–46	46–50		45–51
Weymouth	53–43	64–32	51–45	51–44	49–47	61–35	48–47	66–30	61–35	48–48	44–50	48–48	54–42	65–31	60–36	55–41	62–34	

Legend: Blue = home team win; Yellow = draw; Red = away team win.

== Top five riders (league averages) ==
	Rider	Nat	Team	C.M.A.
1	Joe Owen	(England)	Newcastle	11.18
2	Martin Yeates	(England)	Weymouth	10.41
3	Rod Hunter	(Australia)	Newcastle	10.39
4	Bobby Beaton	(Scotland)	Newcastle	10.12
5	Jim McMillan	(Scotland)	Glasgow	10.03

== National League Knockout Cup ==
The 1983 National League Knockout Cup was the 16th edition of the Knockout Cup for tier two teams. Exeter Falcons were the winners of the competition.

First round

Date	Team one	Score	Team two
19/04	Crayford	45-50	Mildenhall
17/04	Mildenhall	55-41	Crayford
01/04	Oxford	51-45	Milton Keynes
29/03	Milton Keynes	47-49	Oxford

Second round

Date	Team one	Score	Team two
22/06	Long Eaton	58-38	Berwick
09/06	Oxford	45-51	Rye House
05/06	Berwick	61-35	Long Eaton
27/05	Peterborough	57-39	Mildenhall
25/05	Mildenhall	58-38	Peterborough
23/05	Newcastle	61-35	Scunthorpe
22/05	Rye House	51-45	Oxford
22/05	Scunthorpe	43-53	Newcastle
20/05	Edinburgh	50-46	Middlesbrough
30/04	Canterbury	45-51	Exeter
24/04	Boston	45-51	Weymouth
22/04	Glasgow	62-34	Stoke
19/04	Weymouth	58-38	Boston
16/04	Stoke	55-41	Glasgow
14/04	Middlesbrough	55-41	Edinburgh
11/04	Exeter	70-26	Canterbury

Quarter-finals

Date	Team one	Score	Team two
15/08	Exeter	64-32	Rye House
14/08	Rye House	55-41	Exeter
23/07	Berwick	45-50	Newcastle
19/07	Weymouth	65-31	Glasgow
03/07	Mildenhall	67-25	Middlesbrough
27/06	Newcastle	53-42	Berwick
11/06	Glasgow	41-54	Weymouth
09/06	Middlesbrough	47-49	Mildenhall

Semi-finals

Date	Team one	Score	Team two
02/10	Mildenhall	66-30	Exeter
12/09	Exeter	74-21	Mildenhall
12/09	Newcastle	54-42	Weymouth
02/08	Weymouth	55-41	Newcastle

=== Final ===
First leg

10 October 1983

Exeter Falcons Kevin Price 10 Rob Maxfield 9 Keith Millard 9 Steve Bishop 8 Rob Ashton 7 Bob Coles 6 Alun Rossiter 3	52 – 43	Weymouth Wildcats Martin Yeates 13 Steve Schofield 10 Simon Cross 9 Stan Bear 9 Gordon Humphreys 1 Chris Martin 1 David Biles 0

County Ground Stadium

Second leg

11 October 1983

Weymouth Wildcats Steve Schofield 15 Martin Yeates 12 Simon Cross 11 Stan Bear 6 Gordon Humphreys 3 David Biles 3 Chris Martin 2	52 – 44	Exeter Falcons Rob Ashton 10 Alun Rossiter 10 Keith Millard 9 Bob Coles 7 Rob Maxfield 5 Kevin Price 2 Steve Bishop 1

Wessex Stadium

Exeter were declared Knockout Cup Champions, winning on aggregate 96–95.

== Riders' Championship ==
Steve McDermott won the Riders' Championship, sponsored by the FSO Cars and held at Wimbledon Stadium on 24 September 1983.

Pos.	Rider	Pts	Total
1	(England) Steve McDermott	3 2 3 3 2	13+3
2	(England) Richard Knight	2 3 3 2 3	13+2
3	(England) Martin Yeates	3 2 1 3 3	12
4	(England) Marvyn Cox	3 3 2 3 0	11
5	(England) Steve Wilcock	f 3 1 3 3	10
6	(England) Dave Perks	2 0 2 2 2	8
7	(England) Dave Trownson	0 1 3 1 2	7
8	(England) Keith Millard	3 2 0 2 0	7
9	(England) Nigel Crabtree	0 3 2 1 1	7
10	(England) Joe Owen	2 ef 3 2 fexc	7
11	(England) Barney Kennett	1 1 2 1 1	6
12	(Scotland) Jim McMillan	2 2 0 1 0	5
13	(England) Barry Thomas	1 1 1 0 1	4
14	(England) Tom Owen	0 1 1 0 2	4
15	(England) Keith White	0 0 0 0 3	3
16	(England) Nigel Sparshott	1 0 0 0 0	1

- f=fell, r-retired, ex=excluded, ef=engine failure

== Pairs ==
The National League Pairs was held at Hyde Road on 4 June and was won by Weymouth Wildcats for the second consecutive season.

Group A
Pos	Team	Pts	Riders
1	Newcastle	15	Owen J 8 Hunter 7
2	Stoke	8	Jackson 5 Owen T 3
3	Berwick	7	McDermott 6 Cribb 1
4	Scunthorpe	6	Crabtree 6 Hollingworth 0

Group B
Pos	Team	Pts	Riders
1	Glasgow	14	McMillan 9 Lawson 5
2	Peterborough	10	Allen 6 Pullen 4
3	Middlesbrough	9	Wilcock 5 Spink 4
4	Canterbury	3	Mullarkey 3 Kennett 0

Group C
Pos	Team	Pts	Riders
1	Weymouth	14	Yeates 7 Cross 7
2	Crayford	9	Bosley 5 Thomas 4
3	Rye House	6	Cox 4 Garrad 2
4	Edinburgh	5	Fiora 5 Hunter 0

Group D
Pos	Team	Pts	Riders
1	Mildenhall	11	Harrison 6 Knight 5
2	Boston	9	Lomas 6 Gagen 3
3	Milton K	9	McKinna 9 White 0
4	Long Eaton	6	Stead 6 Molyneux 0

Semi finals

- Weymouth bt Newcastle
- Glasgow bt Mildenhall

Final

- Weymouth bt Glasgow

== Fours ==
Newcastle Diamonds won the fours championship final for the second successive year, held at the East of England Arena on 24 July.

Semi finals

- SF1 = Newcastle 15, Milton Keynes 13, Middlesbrough 13, Crayford 7
- SF2 = Mildenhall 21, Long Eaton 11, Edinburgh 8, Weymouth 7

Final

Pos	Team	Pts	Riders
1	Newcastle Diamonds	21	Emerson 6, Hunter 5, Owen 5, Scarisbrick 3, Beaton 2
2	Mildenhall Fen Tigers	17	Knight 5, Harrison 5, Baldwin 4, Henry 3
3	Milton Keynes Knights	6	Pendlebury 2, White 1, Clarke 1, McKinna 1, Mallett 1
4	Long Eaton Invaders	4	Perks 2, Molyneux 1, Stead 1, Frankland 0, Evitts 0

== Final leading averages ==
Rider	Team	Average
Joe Owen	Newcastle	11.10
Rod Hunter	Newcastle	10.51
Martin Yeates	Weymouth	10.39
Bobby Beaton	Newcastle	10.20
Steve Lawson	Glasgow	10.00
Jim McMillan	Glasgow	9.85
Marvyn Cox	Rye House	9.83
Barry Thomas	Crayford	9.69
Steve Wilcock	Middlesbrough	9.48
Steve McDermott	Berwick	9.43
Bob Garrad	Rye House	9.28

== Riders & final averages ==
Berwick

- Steve McDermott 9.43
- Bruce Cribb 8.30
- Brian Collins 6.33
- Paul Thorp 6.20
- Rob Grant Sr. 5.87
- Mike Caroline 5.58
- Phil Jeffrey 4.36
- Robin Hampton 3.43

Boston

- Steve Lomas 7.93
- David Gagen 7.75
- Billy Burton 6.40
- Phil Alderman 5.67
- David Blackburn 5.21
- Dennis Mallett 4.94
- Peter Framingham 4.37
- Pete Chapman 4.31
- Guy Wilson 3.92
- Michael Holding 2.83

Canterbury

- Denzil Kent 8.20
- Barney Kennett 7.56
- Kelvin Mullarkey 7.43
- Andy Hibbs 6.70
- Jamie Luckhurst 6.27
- Dave Mullett 5.66
- Laurie Etheridge 5.54
- Kevin Brice 5.47
- Keith Pritchard 4.91

Crayford

- Barry Thomas 9.69
- Paul Bosley 7.88
- Kevin Teager 7.56
- Andy Galvin 6.72
- Alan Sage 6.63
- Alan Mogridge 6.59
- Trevor Banks 6.46

Edinburgh

- Dave Trownson 8.74
- Mark Fiora 7.77
- Brett Saunders 7.44
- George Hunter 6.96
- Chris Turner 6.90
- Roger Lambert 6.10
- Glyn Taylor 6.07
- Sean Courtney 4.68
- Chris Kelly 2.83
- Scott Cook 2.35

Exeter

- Keith Millard 8.73
- Rob Maxfield 7.88
- Rob Ashton 7.35
- Alun Rossiter 7.12
- Steve Bishop 7.03
- Kevin Price 6.28
- Bob Coles 5.74

Glasgow

- Steve Lawson 10.00
- Jimmy McMillan 9.85
- Kenny McKinna 9.00
- Andy Reid 8.23
- Colin Caffrey 5.64
- David Cassels 4.95
- Jim Beaton 4.00
- Martin McKinna 3.74
- Geoff Powell 3.57
- Miles Evans 3.40
- David Walsh 2.88

Long Eaton

- Dave Perks 8.14
- Alan Molyneux 8.09
- Paul Stead 7.86
- Paul Evitts 5.64
- John Frankland 5.21
- Mark Stevenson 4.63
- Nicky Allot 3.50
- David Tyler 2.58
- John Proctor 1.18

Middlesbrough

- Steve Wilcock 9.48
- Mike Spink 8.66
- Geoff Pusey 6.72
- Brian Havelock 6.16
- Rob Woffinden 5.92
- Paul Price 5.48
- Ashley Norton 4.77
- Peter Nightingale 2.98
- Mark Crang 2.88

Mildenhall

- Derek Harrison 9.22
- Richard Knight 8.98
- Carl Baldwin 8.23
- Robert Henry 7.00
- Carl Blackbird 6.42
- Dave Jackson 4.78
- Andy Warne 4.11
- Ian Farnham 2.34
- Rob Parish 1.80

Milton Keynes

- Craig Featherby 8.66
- Keith White 8.56
- Steve Payne 8.51
- Charlie McKinna 7.84
- Chris Pidcock 6.09
- Paul Clarke 5.57
- Dennis Mallett 5.02
- Peter Framingham 5.00
- Steve Mildoon 2.78
- Rob Wall 2.37

Newcastle

- Joe Owen 11.10
- Rod Hunter 10.51
- Bobby Beaton 10.20
- Alan Emerson 7.20
- Martin Scarisbrick 5.74
- Bernie Collier 3.60
- Dave Wild 3.05
- Lawrie Bloomfield 2.52
- Paul McHale 2.47
- Neal Barnsley 1.80
- Greg DeKok 1.63

Oxford

- Nigel Sparshott 8.06
- Graham Drury 7.79
- Ian Clark 7.28
- Mike Wilding 7.13
- Kevin Smart 6.35
- Wayne Jackson 5.40
- Nigel De'ath 5.36
- Steve Crockett 4.71
- Mark Summerfield 4.17
- Mark Chessell 1.65

Peterborough

- Ashley Pullen 8.74
- Dave Allen 8.09
- Mick Hines 7.22
- Ian Barney 6.53
- Andy Buck 6.44
- Mike Spinks 5.37
- Neil Cotton 4.89
- Dale Watson 2.36

Rye House

- Marvyn Cox 9.83
- Bobby Garrad 9.28
- Steve Naylor 8.00
- Peter Johns 7.03
- Kerry Gray 5.73
- Steve Bryenton 5.70
- Andrew Silver 4.69
- Kevin Bowen 4.60
- Chris Chaplin 2.89
- Terry Broadbank 2.87
- John Barclay 1.27

Scunthorpe

- Nigel Crabtree 9.10
- Andy Fisher 7.59
- Rob Hollingworth 7.15
- Craig Pendlebury 6.91
- Julian Parr 6.56
- Derek Richardson 6.28
- Ian Gibson 5.68
- Kevin Armitage 5.29
- Mark DeKok 4.00

Stoke

- Tom Owen 8.98
- Pete Smith 7.35
- John Jackson 6.66
- Ian Robertson 5.16
- Gary O'Hare 4.91
- Jim Burdfield 4.80
- Steve Sant 3.95
- Gary Johnson 3.00
- Richie Owen 2.60

Weymouth

- Martin Yeates 10.39
- Steve Schofield 8.97
- Simon Cross 8.35
- Stan Bear 7.18
- Rob Mather 5.83
- Gordon Humphreys 4.40
- Chris Martin 4.11
- David Biles 2.87
- Ian Humphreys 2.17

== See also ==
- List of United Kingdom Speedway League Champions
- Knockout Cup (speedway)
