= 1984 National League season =

British motorcycle speedway season

- League: National League
- No. of competitors: 16
- Champions: Long Eaton Invaders
- Knockout Cup: Hackney Kestrels
- Individual: Ian Barney
- Pairs: Stoke Potters
- Fours: Mildenhall Fen Tigers
- Highest average: Steve Lawson
- Division/s above: 1984 British League

The 1984 National League was contested as the second division of motorcycle speedway in the United Kingdom.

== Summary ==
A new team called the Arena Essex Hammers, promoted by Wally Mawdsley joined the league. Crayford Kestrels moved to Hackney Wick Stadium to become the Hackney Kestrels.

The title was won by the Long Eaton Invaders who finished just one point clear of the Mildenhall Fen Tigers. Remarkably the Long Eaton Invaders had gone from finishing last in 1983 to first in 1984 under former rider Vic White. He had been brought in as the team manager and had signed Graham Drury and Chris Pidcock to support Dave Perks, Paul Stead and David Tyler.

== Final table ==
Pos	Team	PL	W	D	L	Pts
1	Long Eaton Invaders	30	21	1	8	43
2	Mildenhall Fen Tigers	30	19	4	7	42
3	Stoke Potters	30	17	3	10	37
4	Hackney Kestrels	30	16	0	14	32
5	Berwick Bandits	30	15	1	14	31
6	Boston Barracudas	30	15	1	14	31
7	Milton Keynes Knights	30	14	1	15	29
8	Rye House Rockets	30	14	0	16	28
9	Middlesbrough Tigers	30	13	2	15	28
10	Scunthorpe Stags	30	13	2	15	28
11	Glasgow Tigers	30	13	2	15	28
12	Canterbury Crusaders	30	13	1	16	27
13	Weymouth Wildcats	30	13	0	17	26
14	Arena Essex Hammers	30	11	3	16	25
15	Peterborough Panthers	30	12	0	18	24
16	Edinburgh Monarchs	30	10	1	19	21

== Fixtures and results ==
Home \ Away	AE	BER	BOS	CAN	ED	GLA	HAC	LE	MID	MIL	MK	PET	RH	SCU	STO	WEY
Arena Essex		51–27	37–41	42–32	41–37	40–38	41–36	41–36	40–38	39–39	31–47	46–31	41–36	37–37	32–46	48–30
Berwick	38–40		49–29	44–34	40–38	48–30	47–31	41–37	46–32	40–37	46–32	44–34	43–34	44–34	37–41	51–37
Boston	51–27	50–28		40–36	54–24	47–31	40–34	41–37	49–29	38–40	40–38	60–18	47–31	41–37	41–37	57–21
Canterbury	49–29	47–31	54–24		45–32	39–39	42–36	35–43	44–34	40–37	45–33	51–27	45–33	42–36	44–34	50–28
Edinburgh	47–31	40–38	45–32	42–34		36–41	44–34	37–41	34–43	38–40	39–38	54–24	41–37	51–26	39–39	36–42
Glasgow	39–39	40–38	47–31	48–30	34–44		45–33	38–39	47–31	41–37	49–29	57–21	43–35	41–36	45–33	48–30
Hackney	44–34	44–34	46–32	47–31	47–31	43–35		42–36	46–32	37–41	46–32	53–25	48–30	55–23	45–33	45–32
Long Eaton	48–30	45–32	57–21	44–34	47–31	49–29	41–37		50–28	36–42	50–28	50–25	47–31	58–20	47–31	41–36
Middlesbrough	46–31	36–42	43–35	50–28	40–37	45–32	42–36	39–39		37–41	40–38	51–27	52–26	41–36	39–39	48–30
Mildenhall	48–30	39–39	39–39	50–28	45–33	52–26	54–24	44–34	47–31		39–39	48–30	44–34	41–36	42–36	51–27
Milton Keynes	40–38	38–40	55–23	40–38	49–29	51–27	47–30	37–41	41–37	42–36		55–2	41–37	43–35	40–38	46–31
Peterborough	44–34	41–37	43–34	45–33	44–34	53–25	42–34	38–40	43–35	36–42	44–34		52–25	41–37	38–40	41–37
Rye House	43–34	44–32	52–26	42–36	58–20	43–35	42–36	44–34	37–40	44–34	44–33	44–22		45–33	43–35	47–31
Scunthorpe	46–32	41–36	50–27	43–35	43–35	43–35	36–41	42–36	41–37	41–36	52–26	49–29	42–35		39–39	41–36
Stoke	48–30	44–34	44–34	44–34	50–28	53–25	42–36	36–42	47–30	49–29	44–33	53–25	43–35	42–36		55–23
Weymouth	39.5–38.5	42–35	46–32	47–31	44–34	45–32	38–40	38–40	52–26	38–40	51–27	41–37	50–28	44–33	40–38	

Legend: Blue = home team win; Yellow = draw; Red = away team win.

== Top five riders (league averages) ==
	Rider	Nat	Team	C.M.A.
1	Steve Lawson	(England)	Glasgow	10.41
2	Martin Yeates	(England)	Weymouth	10.35
3	Steve Wilcock	(England)	Middlesbrough	9.89
4	Tom Owen	(England)	Stoke	9.77
5	Steve McDermott	(England)	Berwick	9.74

== National League Knockout Cup ==
The 1984 National League Knockout Cup was the 17th edition of the Knockout Cup for tier two teams. Hackney Kestrels were the winners of the competition.

First round

Date	Team one	Score	Team two
08/06	Peterborough	48-30	Arena Essex
31/05	Arena Essex	41-37	Peterborough
11/05	Peterborough	42-36	Arena Essex
26/04	Arena Essex	42-36	Peterborough
26/04	Middlesbrough	52-26	Scunthorpe
22/04	Boston	40-38	Edinburgh
21/04	Berwick	44-34	Glasgow
21/04	Stoke	39-38	Long Eaton
20/04	Edinburgh	46-32	Boston
20/04	Glasgow	33-44	Berwick
18/04	Long Eaton	45-33	Stoke
17/04	Weymouth	34-44	Canterbury
16/04	Scunthorpe	43-35	Middlesbrough
15/04	Mildenhall	44-34	Milton Keynes
15/04	Rye House	36-42	Hackney
14/04	Canterbury	39-39	Weymouth
13/04	Hackney	53-25	Rye House
10/04	Milton Keynes	41-37	Mildenhall

Quarter-finals

Date	Team one	Score	Team two
28/07	Canterbury	44-34	Peterborough
20/07	Edinburgh	35-43	Berwick
20/07	Peterborough	47-30	Canterbury
18/05	Hackney	51-27	Mildenhall
17/05	Middlesbrough	55-23	Long Eaton
13/05	Mildenhall	44-34	Hackney
05/05	Berwick	43-35	Edinburgh
02/05	Long Eaton	48-30	Middlesbrough

Semi-finals

Date	Team one	Score	Team two
07/09	Peterborough	53-25	Hackney
27/08	Hackney	54-24	Peterborough
26/07	Middlesbrough	41-37	Berwick
21/07	Berwick	46-31	Middlesbrough

=== Final ===
First leg

21 September 1984

Hackney Kestrels Barry Thomas 11 Trevor Banks 11 Paul Bosley 7 Andy Galvin 6 Kevin Teager 5 Paul Whittaker 5 Linden Warner 1	46 – 32	Berwick Bandits Jim McMillan 13 Bruce Cribb 12 David Walsh 3 Dennis Gallagher 3 Eric Broadbelt 1 Mick Caroline 0 Steve McDermott R/R

Hackney Wick Stadium

Second leg

29 September 1984

Berwick Bandits Jim McMillan 12 Bruce Cribb 12 David Walsh 10 Dennis Gallagher 3 Craig Pendlebury 3 Mick Caroline 0 Steve McDermott R/R	40 – 37	Hackney Kestrels Barry Thomas 11 Trevor Banks 7 Kevin Teager 6 Paul Bosley 5 Andy Galvin 5 Paul Whittaker 3 Linden Warner 0

Berrington Lough Stadium

Hackney were declared Knockout Cup Champions, winning on aggregate 83–72.

== Riders' Championship ==
Ian Barney won the Riders' Championship. The final was originally held at Wimbledon Stadium on 23 September but was abandoned after eight heats due to rain. The Championship was restaged on 13 October at East of England Arena.

Pos.	Rider	Total
1	(England) Ian Barney	14+3
2	(England) Dave Perks	14+ef
3	(England) Martin Yeates	12+3
4	(England) Andy Buck	12+2
5	(England) Steve Wilcock	10
6	(England) Colin Cook	8
7	(England) Tom Owen	8
?	(England) Alan Sage	
?	(England) Bob Garrad	
?	(Australia) Mark Fiora	
?	(England) Barry Thomas	
?	(New Zealand) Bruce Cribb	4
?	(England) Keith White	
?	(England) Jamie Luckhurst	
?	(England) Steve Lawson	
?	(England) Carl Baldwin	

== Pairs ==
The National League Pairs was held at Hackney Wick Stadium on 30 June and was won by Stoke Potters.

Top 4 Qualifying
Pos	Team	Pts	Riders
1	Stoke	20	Owen T 12, Crabtree 8
2	Berwick	18	Cribb 11, McDermott 7
3	Weymouth	18	Yeates, Biles 6
4	Mildenhall	18	Blackbird, Bales 7

Semi finals

- Stoke bt Mildenhall
- Berwick bt Weymouth

Final

- Stoke bt Berwick

== Fours ==
Mildenhall won the fours championship final, held at the East of England Showground on 22 July.

Semi finals

- SF1 = Boston 16, Stoke 13, Canterbury 10, Berwick 9
- SF2 = Mildenhall 23 Milton Keynes 10, Middlesbrough 8, Hackney 7

Final

Pos	Team	Pts	Riders
1	Mildenhall Fen Tigers	19	Bales 6, Henry 5, Blackbird 5, Baldwin 3
2	Stoke Potters	15	Crabtree 5, Thorp 4, Owen 4, Evitts 2
3	Milton Keynes Knights	11	White 4, Blackburn 4, Payne 2, De'Ath 1, Framingham 0
4	Boston Barracudas	3	Burton 2, Wilson 1, Cook 0, Hollingworth 0

== Leading averages ==
Rider	Team	Average
Steve Lawson	Glasgow	10.38
Martin Yeates	Weymouth	10.35
Steve McDermott	Berwick	9.97
Tom Owen	Stoke	9.86
Steve Wilcock	Middlesbrough	9.71
Nigel Crabtree	Stoke	9.56
Bobby Beaton	Edinburgh	9.30
Bruce Cribb	Berwick	9.24
Alun Rossiter	Weymouth	9.23
Carl Baldwin	Mildenhall	9.11
Mark Fiora	Edinburgh	9.10

== Riders & final averages ==
Arena Essex

- Bob Humphreys 7.19
- Alan Sage 7.19
- Martin Goodwin 7.10
- David Smart 6.25
- Bill Barrett 6.02
- David Cheshire 5.61
- Jeremy Luckhurst 4.81
- Peter Johns 4.77
- Steve Collins 1.33

Berwick

- Steve McDermott 9.97
- Bruce Cribb 9.24
- Jimmy McMillan 8.73
- Charlie McKinna 6.65
- Phil Kynman 6.21
- Craig Pendlebury 5.40
- David Walsh 5.34
- Rob Grant Sr. 5.10
- Mike Caroline 3.64
- Dennis Gallagher 3.64
- Paul Cooper 3.58
- Jacko Irving 2.50

Boston

- Colin Cook 7.26
- Rob Hollingworth 7.16
- Guy Wilson 7.11
- David Gagen 7.03
- Dennis Mallett 6.67
- Billy Burton 6.44
- Paul Clarke 5.63
- Steve Lomas 5.14
- Pete Chapman 4.40

Canterbury

- Jamie Luckhurst 8.11
- Alan Mogridge 7.69
- Dave Mullett 7.61
- Barney Kennett 6.73
- Rob Tilbury 5.72
- Kevin Brice 5.59
- Andy Fines 5.16
- Keith Pritchard 5.13
- Neville Tatum 4.79

Edinburgh

- Bobby Beaton 9.30
- Mark Fiora 9.10
- Dave Trownson 7.67
- Craig Pendlebury 6.39
- Sean Courtney 6.00
- Roger Lambert 5.85
- Brett Saunders 5.40
- Paul McHale 4.48
- Phil Jeffrey 4.31
- Martin Johnson 2.78

Glasgow

- Steve Lawson 10.38
- Andy Reid 7.64
- Brian Collins 6.58
- Colin Caffrey 6.11
- Martin McKinna 5.44
- Jim Beaton 4.55
- David Cassels 3.26
- Tam Baggley 2.75
- Barry Ayres 2.67
- Geoff Powell 2.59

Hackney

- Trevor Banks 8.46
- Barry Thomas 8.44
- Kevin Teager 7.34
- Andy Galvin 6.01
- Mark Terry 5.22
- Linden Warner 5.16
- Paul Whittaker 4.98

Long Eaton

- Dave Perks 8.99
- Paul Stead 8.75
- Graham Drury 8.50
- David Tyler 7.37
- Chris Pidcock 6.96
- Miles Evans 5.83
- Mark Stevenson 5.41
- John Frankland 5.35

Middlesbrough

- Steve Wilcock 9.71
- Mike Spink 8.50
- Geoff Pusey 7.26
- Paul Price 5.70
- Pete Smith 4.87
- Mark Crang 4.75
- Jim Burdfield 4.68
- Ashley Norton 4.24
- Rob Carter 3.22
- John Place 2.06

Mildenhall

- Carl Baldwin 9.11
- Carl Blackbird 8.97
- Robert Henry 8.42
- Ray Bales 7.89
- Dave Jackson 5.29
- Wally Hill 4.64
- Rob Parish 3.70
- Ian Farnham 2.67

Milton Keynes

- Keith White 8.84
- Kevin Smart 8.39
- David Blackburn 7.36
- Paul Clarke 6.75
- Nigel De'ath 6.38
- Steve Payne 5.89
- Peter Framingham 5.18
- Rob Wall 4.94
- Chris Hunt 2.93

Peterborough

- Mick Hines 7.51
- Dave Allen 6.98
- Ian Barney 6.96
- Andy Fisher 6.36
- Keith Millard 6.25
- Adrian Hume 5.86
- Mike Spinks 4.65
- Neil Cotton 4.32
- Lawrie Bloomfield 3.90
- Mike Smart 2.56

Rye House

- Bobby Garrad 8.69
- Andrew Silver 7.79
- Steve Naylor 7.69
- Kelvin Mullarkey 7.10
- Kerry Gray 5.71
- Steve Bryenton 5.46
- Chris Chaplin 4.93
- Michael Keepe 3.86
- Mark Chessell 3.70
- Gary Rolls 3.31

Scunthorpe

- Julian Parr 8.11
- Andy Buck 7.80
- Rob Woffinden 7.65
- Derek Richardson 7.5
- Paul Evitts 6.64
- Mike Wilding 6.06
- Kevin Armitage 5.54
- Ian Gibson 4.73
- Mark Burrows 3.94
- Richie Owen 2.43

Stoke

- Tom Owen 9.86
- Nigel Crabtree 9.56
- Paul Thorp 7.26
- Paul Evitts 6.47
- Steve Bishop 5.47
- Ashley Pullen 5.46
- Graham Jones 5.09
- Phil Alderman 5.00
- Ian Stead 4.25

Weymouth

- Martin Yeates 10.35
- Alun Rossiter 9.23
- David Biles 7.06
- John Barker 6.84
- Kevin Price 5.21
- Gordon Humphreys 4.28
- Mike Semmonds 4.10
- Michael Coles 3.78
- Ian Humphreys 3.62
- Dave Gibbs 3.55
- Terry Mussett 2.92
- Wayne Barrett 1.09

== See also ==
- List of United Kingdom Speedway League Champions
- Knockout Cup (speedway)
