= Joe Owen =

British motorcycle speedway rider (born 1956)

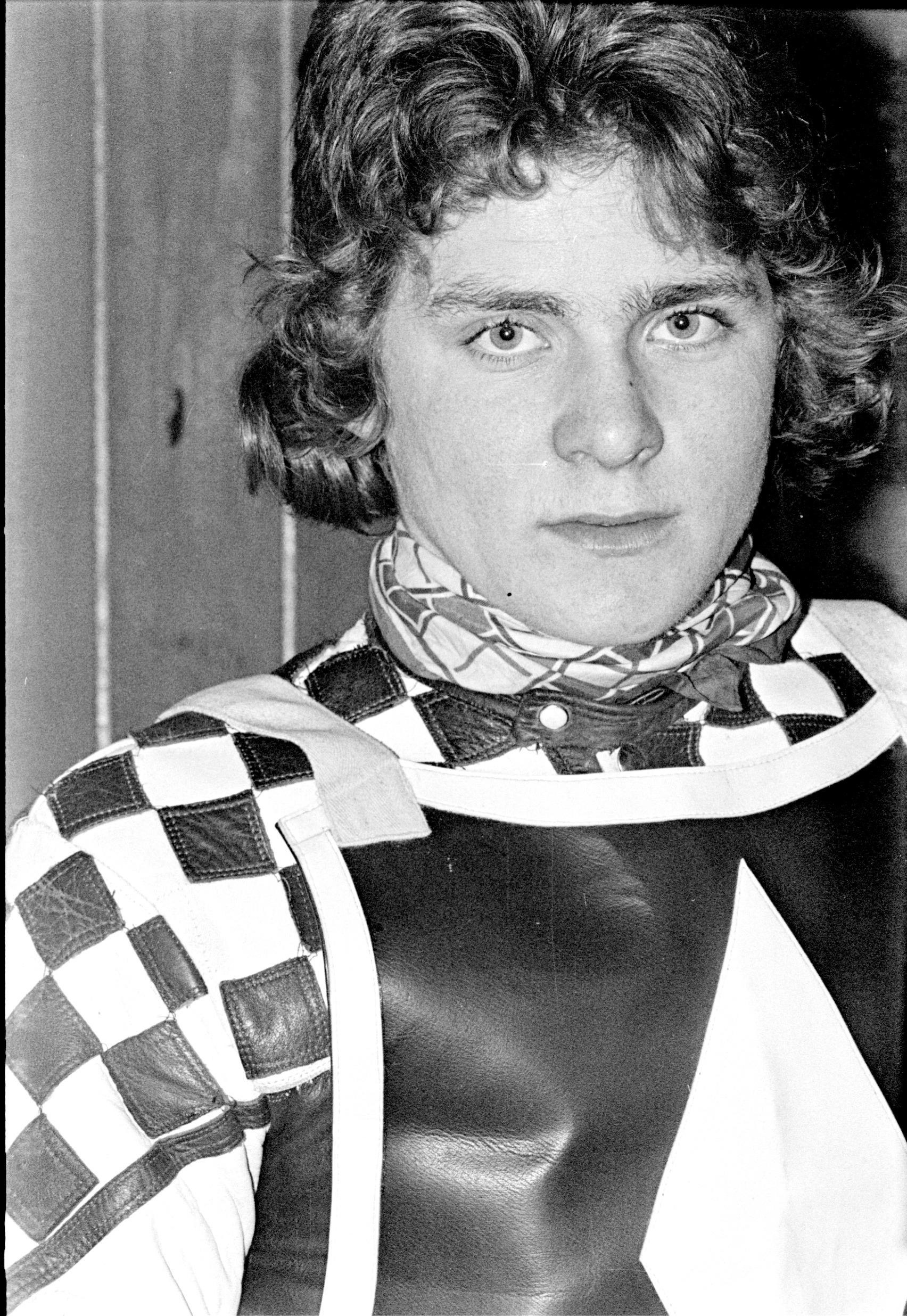
- Owen in 1976
- Born: 13 September 1956 (age 70); Ormskirk, Lancashire, England
- Nationality: British (English)

Career history
- 1973–1974: Barrow Bombers
- 1974: Belle Vue Aces
- 1975–1976, 1982–1984: Newcastle Diamonds
- 1975–1981: Hull Vikings
- 1982: Cradley Heathens
- 1982–1983: Leicester Lions
- 1985: Ellesmere Port Gunners

Individual honours
- 1976, 1982: National League Riders Champion
- 1979: Daily Mirror/Weslake 16-Lapper

Team honours
- 1976, 1982, 1983, 1985: National League Champion
- 1976, 1982, 1983: National League Four Team Champion
- 1976, 1982: National League KO Cup Winner
- 1985: National League Best Pairs
- 1982, 1983: National League Supernational Playoff Champion

Joseph William Owen (born 13 September 1956) is a British motorcycle speedway rider from England. He earned three international caps for the Great Britain national speedway team.

== Career ==
Owen was born on 13 September 1956, in Ormskirk. He took up speedway at age 14, at the training school of the Belle Vue Aces. In 1973, he made his competitive debut, for Barrow Bombers in the British League second division.

By 1974, Owen averaged over seven points per match and rode in the Young England team in matches against Australasia and Poland. In 1975, he moved to Newcastle Diamonds and rode in the top division for Hull Vikings, for which he would go on to ride until 1981. He again represented Young England in 1975 and finished as runner-up in the British Junior Championship.

During the 1976 National League season, Owen won the National League Riders Final, and experienced an outstanding season. In addition to the riders title, he also won the Fours Championship and topped the league averages with a remarkable 11.55 average. He finished as runner-up in the European Under-21 Championship in 1977.

Owen returned to Newcastle in the National League in 1982, also riding on loan at Leicester Lions in the British League in 1982. In 1982, he won the National League Rider's Championship, held at Wimbledon Stadium on 18 September for the second time and the fours championship for a second time.

The following season in 1983, Owen won the fours championship for the third time.

In 1985, Owen moved on to Ellesmere Port Gunners in what proved to be his final season, in which the Gunners won the National League and Owen won the National League Best Pairs title with Louis Carr. A crash at Birmingham in 1985 ended his career and left him paralysed.

Owen went on to represent the full England team on several occasions.
