= Alan Emerson =

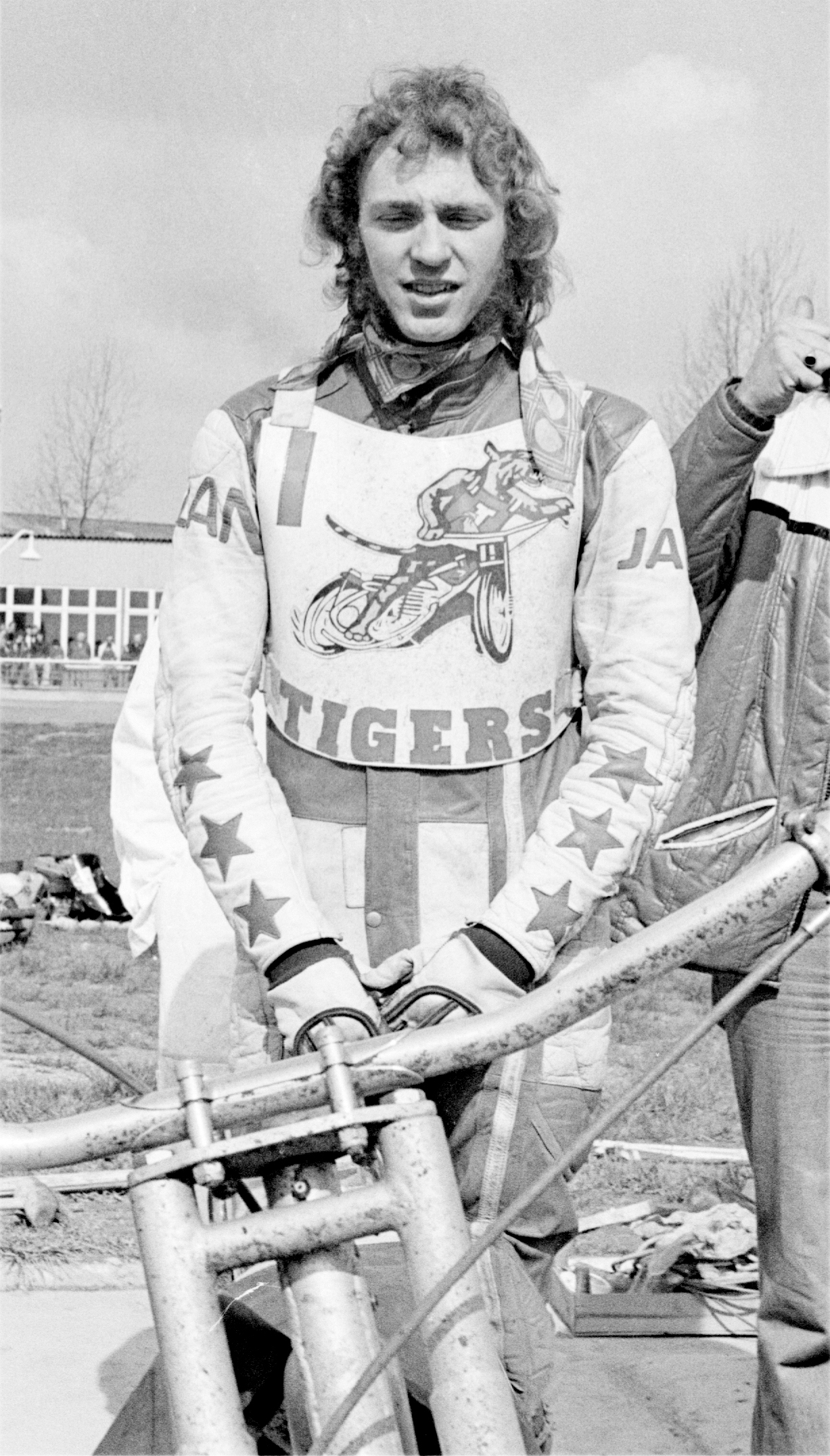
- Born: 29 May 1957 (age 69); Haltwhistle, England
- Nationality: British (English)

Career history
- 1973-1977: Teesside Tigers
- 1975: Wolverhampton Wolves
- 1975-1976: Leicester Lions
- 1977: Belle Vue Aces
- 1978-1980: Birmingham Brummies
- 1979: Workington Comets
- 1980: Glasgow Tigers
- 1981-1983: Newcastle Diamonds
- 1981: Hull Vikings

Team honours
- 1982, 1983: National League Champion
- 1982: National League KO Cup Winner
- 1982, 1983: National League Supernational Playoff Winner
- 1982, 1983: National League Four Team Champion

Robert Alan Emerson (born 29 May 1957), generally known as Alan Emerson is a British former motorcycle speedway rider.

== Career ==
Born in Haltwhistle, Northumberland, Emerson had second half rides at Workington, Belle Vue, and Teesside before making his competitive debut in 1973 for Teesside Tigers. He also competed regularly in grasstrack.

In 1975, Emerson had his first rides in British speedway's top flight with Leicester Lions, the team he also rode for in 1976, doubling up with Teesside.

In 1978, Emerson had his first of three seasons with Birmingham Brummies, doubling up in 1979 with Workington Comets and Glasgow Tigers respectively. In 1981, he moved on to Newcastle Diamonds, where he rode for three seasons before retiring from the sport.

In 1982, Emerson helped the Newcastle win two Fours Championships during the 1982 National League season and the 1983 National League season.
