= Mike Ferreira =

Zimbabwean speedway rider (1955–2014)

- Born: 21 November 1955; Salisbury, Rhodesia
- Nationality: Zimbabwean

Career history
- 1974: Coatbridge Tigers
- 1978–1981: Canterbury Crusaders
- 1978: Exeter Falcons
- 1980–1982: Swindon Robins
- 1983–1985: Wimbledon Dons

Individual honours
- 1982: British Speedway Championship finalist
- 1981: National League Riders' Champion
- 1985: The Laurels

Team honours
- 1978: National League Champion
- 1981: National League Pairs Champion

Michaal John Ferreira (1955–2014) was a Zimbabwean motorcycle speedway rider.

== Career ==
Ferreira rode in the top two tiers of British Speedway from 1974 to 1985, riding for various clubs.

During the 1981 National League season, Ferreira topped the league averages and became the National League Riders' Champion, held at Wimbledon Stadium on 26 September. He also doubled up with Crusaders teammate and fellow Zimbabwean Denzil Kent to win the National League Pairs.

Ferreira reached the final of the British Speedway Championship in 1982.
