= Rod Hunter (speedway rider) =

Australian speedway rider

- Born: 25 April 1956 (age 70); Melbourne, Australia
- Nationality: Australian

Career history
- 1978–1984, 1989: Newcastle Diamonds
- 1978, 1980–1981: Hull Vikings
- 1979, 1982–1983: Belle Vue Aces
- 1980: Coventry Bees
- 1982: Eastbourne Eagles
- 1985: Halifax Dukes
- 1990: Middlesbrough Bears

Individual honours
- 1983: Victorian State Champion

Team honours
- 1982, 1983: National League Champion
- 1982: National League KO Cup Winner
- 1982, 1983: National League Supernational Playoff Winner
- 1982, 1983: National League Four Team Champion

Roderick Norman Hunter (born 25 April 1956) is an Australian former speedway rider. He earned two caps for the Australia national speedway team.

== Speedway career ==
Hunter rode in the top two tiers of British Speedway from 1978 to 1990, riding for various clubs.

Hunter was one of the leading National League riders and finished in the top ten averages in 1982, 1983 and 1990. He was also the Australian Longtrack Champion in 1978 and 1983.

In 1982, Hunter helped the Newcastle Diamonds win two Fours Championship during the 1982 National League season and the 1983 National League season.

In 1989, Hunter returned to ride for Newcastle again.
