= Canterbury Crusaders (speedway) =

British motorcycle speedway team

Club information
- Track address: Kingsmead Stadium; Kingsmead Road; Canterbury; Kent
- Country: England
- Founded: 1968
- Closed: 1987

Club facts
- Colours: Blue and Gold
- Track size: 360 metres (390 yd)

Major team honours
NL/BL tier 2 champions	1970, 1978
British League Div Two KO Cup winners	1968
National League Pairs champions

The Canterbury Crusaders were a motorcycle speedway team who operated from the Kingsmead Stadium, Kingsmead Road, Canterbury from 1968 to 1987. For all of their 20-year existence, the Crusaders operated at the second level of British league speedway, in British League Division Two and the National League.

== History ==
=== Origins and 1960s ===
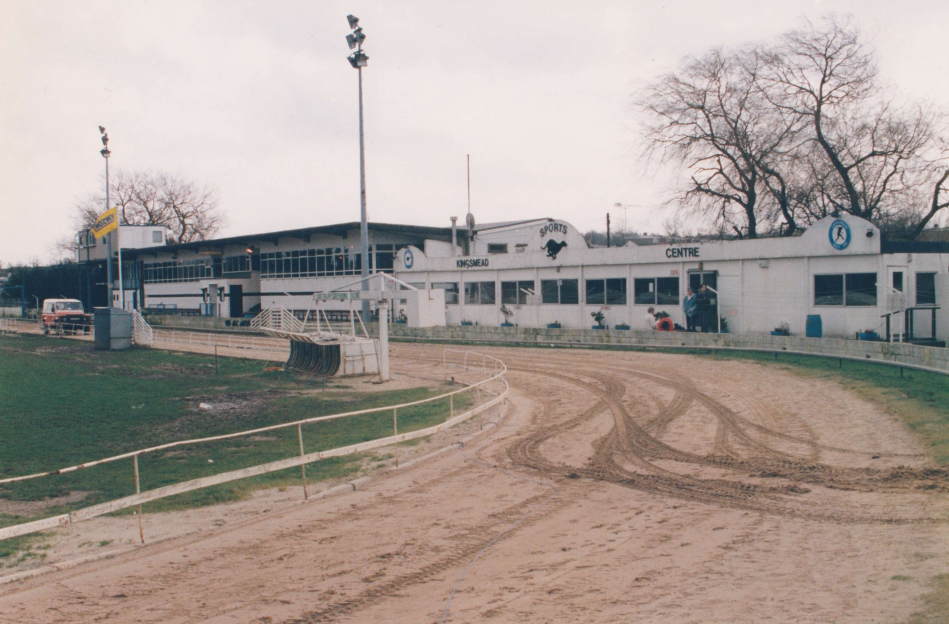
Kingsmead Stadium

In early 1968 speedway promoter Johnnie Hoskins held a test fixture for councillors to make a judgement on the noise levels and whether to allow speedway to take place around Kingsmead Stadium. After speedway was given the green light, the team known as the Crusaders were founder members of British League Division Two. The first league meeting at Kingsmead, on 18 May 1968, saw the Crusaders narrowly lose a British League Division Two fixture 38–39 to Belle Vue Colts. The Colts and the Crusaders had contested the first ever Division Two fixture ten days previously at Belle Vue on 8 May, when the Colts won 55–23. In their inaugural season the team, led by Peter Murray and Barry Crowson, won the Knockout Cup, defeating Reading Racers in the final.

=== 1970s ===
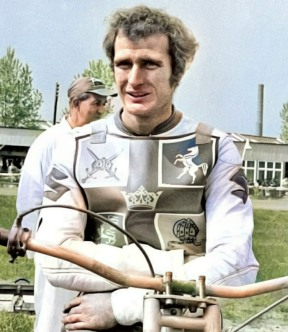
Steve Koppe

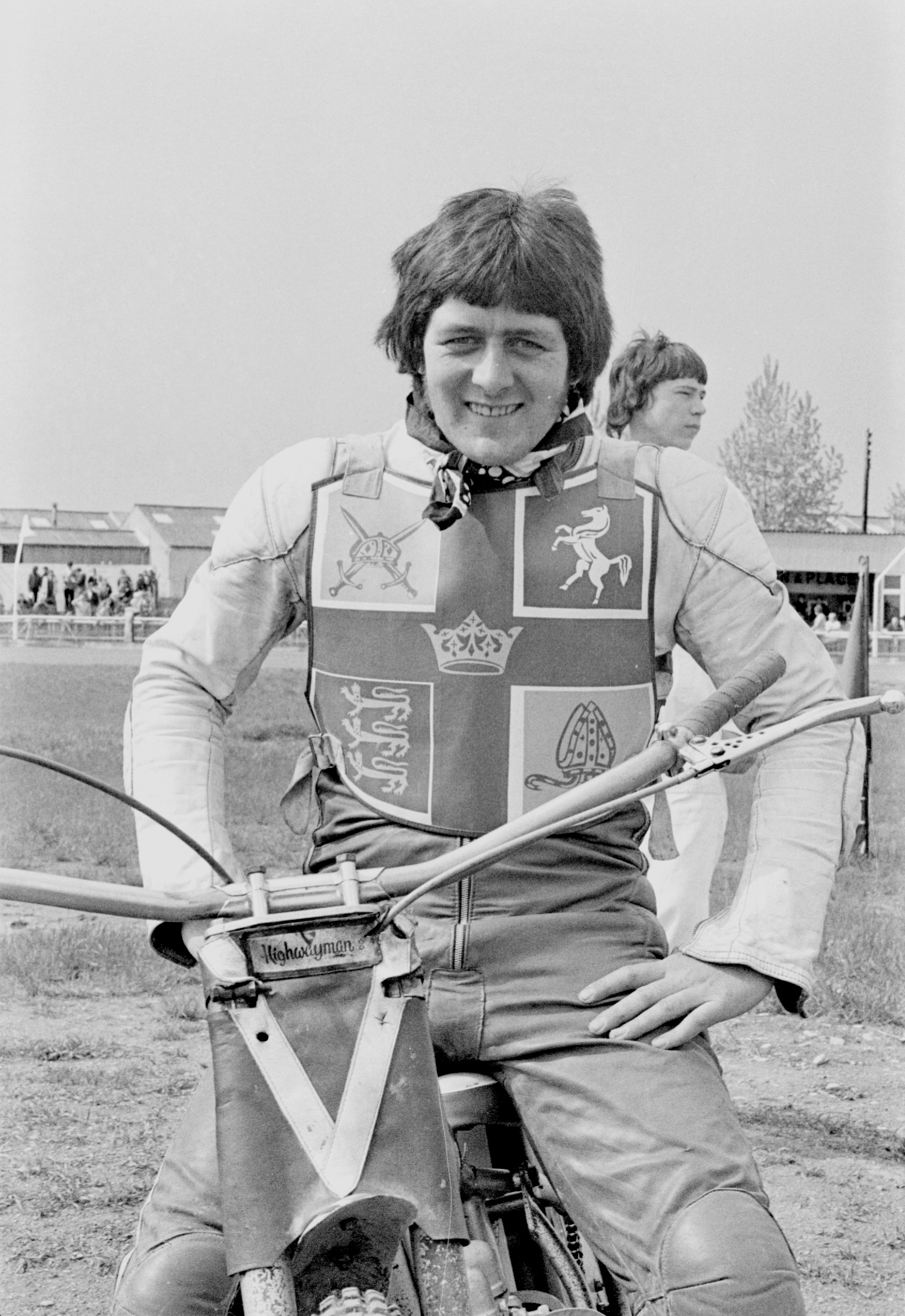
Barney Kennett

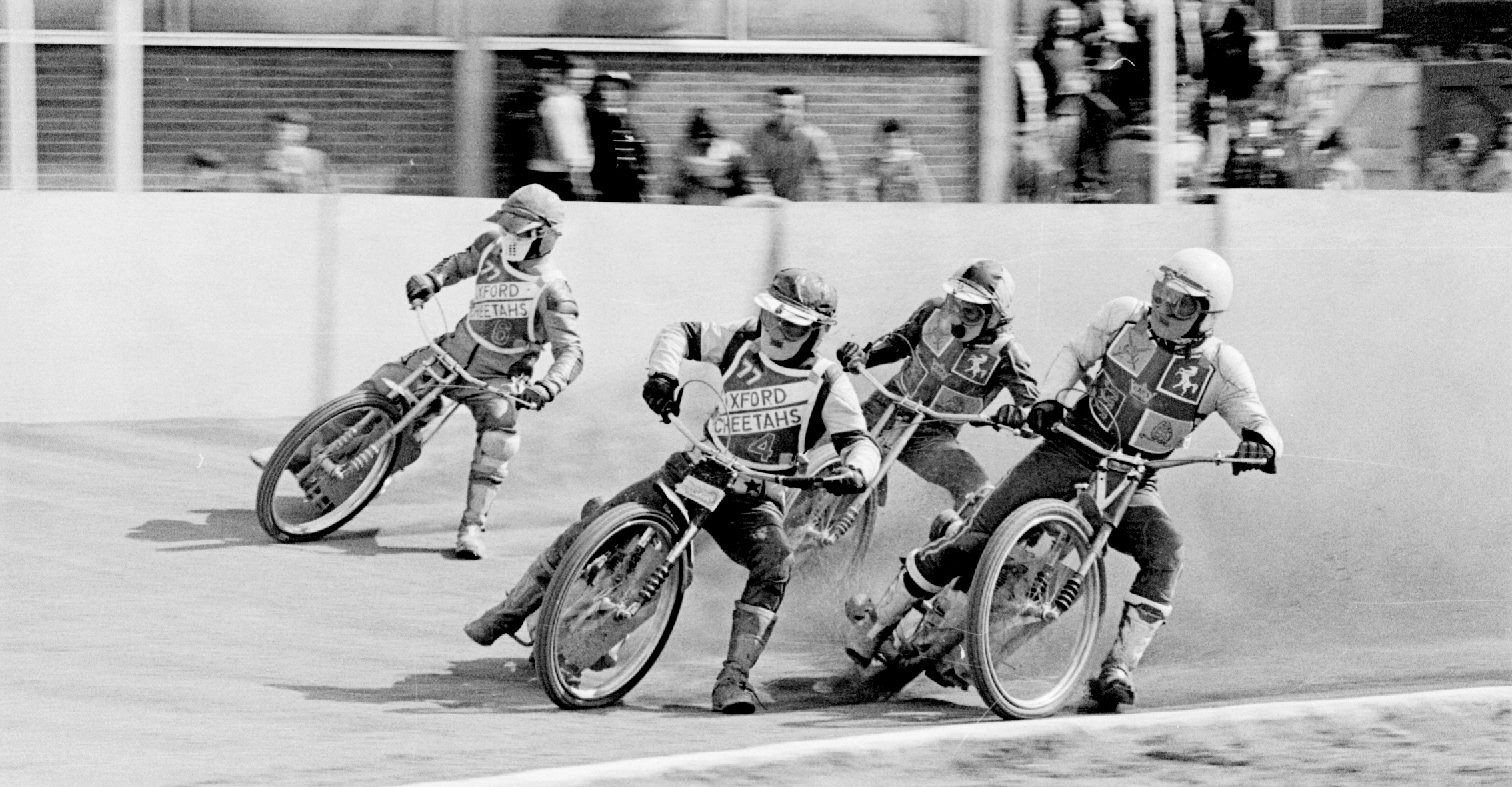
Crusaders away at Oxford in 1977

In just their third season in 1970, the Crusaders' won their first league title despite losing Peter Murray and Martyn Piddock. New Zealander Graeme Smith was signed from Hackney, Barry Crowson returned and Barry Thomas improved significantly to help Canterbury win the league by two points clear of Eastbourne Eagles.

The next five seasons from 1971 to 1975, were a struggle for the Crusaders with a best finish of 10th. Barney Kennett, Steve Koppe and Les Rumsey were brought in during this period and helped the Crusaders recover to consecutive 4th places.

In 1977, the promoters Johnnie Hoskins and Wally Mawdsley had to go to court in order to keep the Kingsmead track open after complaints of noise from local residents. The following year during the 1978 National League season, the Crusaders managed to win a second championship. Although finishing equal on 60 points with Newcastle Diamonds, they won by virtue of the fact that their race points difference was greater than their rival. The Crusaders scoring was led by Rumsey, Riders' champion Koppe and Mike Ferreira. The season was tainted by the death of rider Graham Banks during a grasstrack meeting.

=== 1980s ===
The 1981 season brought an individual title for Zimbabwean Mike Ferreira and a pairs championship success for Ferreira and his countrymate Denzil Kent. The team's performances were significantly less successful as hey failed to climb into the top ten from 1980 to 1987. The leading rider for the Crusaders at the time was Dave Mullett.

In 1986, Wally Mawdsley retired and the lease was taken over by Chris Galvin (father of Andy Galvin). Galvin would allow the Canterbury riders to practice on his Iwade training track but the team was forced to disband on 31 October 1987, when the Canterbury Council refused to renew the Kingsmead Stadium lease.

The final Crusaders fixture took place at Kingsmead on 31 October 1987, when Canterbury defeated Rye House Rockets 49–29 in the second leg of the Kent/Herts Trophy. Greyhound racing continued at Kingsmead until 1999 but the site is now a housing estate.

== Notable riders ==
The longest serving rider was Barney Kennett who rode for the Crusaders from 1971 until 1984.

- Graham Banks
- Nigel Boocock
- Barry Crowson
- Mike Ferreira
- Ted Hubbard
- Barney Kennett
- Denzil Kent
- Steve Koppe
- Dave Mullett
- Peter Murray
- Les Rumsey
- Graeme Smith
- Barry Thomas

== Season summary ==
Extended content

Year and league	Position	Notes
1968 British League Division Two season	7th	Knockout Cup winner
1969 British League Division Two season	6th	
1970 British League Division Two season	1st	Champions
1971 British League Division Two season	14th	
1972 British League Division Two season	13th	
1973 British League Division Two season	15th	
1974 British League Division Two season	10th	
1975 New National League season	10th	
1976 National League season	4th	
1977 National League season	4th	
1978 National League season	1st	Champions
1979 National League season	10th	
1980 National League season	18th	
1981 National League season	14th	Pairs winners
1982 National League season	16th	
1983 National League season	15th	
1984 National League season	12th	
1985 National League season	16th	
1986 National League season	15th	
1987 National League season	13th	

== See also ==
- Category:Canterbury Crusaders (speedway) riders
- List of defunct motorcycle speedway teams in the United Kingdom
