= Keith Millard (speedway rider) =

English speedway rider (born 1964)

- Born: 18 November 1964 (age 62); Newent, Gloucestershire, England
- Nationality: British (English)

Career history

Great Britain
- 1981–1984: Exeter Falcons
- 1982: Swindon Robins
- 1983: Poole Pirates
- 1984: Peterborough Panthers
- 1985: Rye House Rockets
- 1987: Milton Keynes Knights

Individual honours
- 1983: British Under 21 champion

Team honours
- 1983: National League KO Cup Winner

Keith John Millard (born 18 November 1964) is a former motorcycle speedway rider from England.

== Career ==
Millard made his British leagues debut during the 1981 National League season aged just 17 years of age, when he rode for Exeter Falcons.

The following season in 1982, Millard improved his average significantly and also made a couple of appearances for Swindon Robins. In 1983, he won the gold medal at the British Speedway Under 21 Championship and was the leading rider at Exeter. He helped Exeter win the 1983 Knockout Cup.

During two seasons with Peterborough Panthers and Rye House Rockets respectively, Millard's form dipped and he did not ride in 1986. His final season was in 1987.
