= Dave Perks =

British speedway rider

- Born: 16 December 1951 (age 74); Halesowen, West Midlands, England
- Nationality: British (English)

Career history
- 1972–1981: Cradley Heathens/United
- 1979: Nottingham Outlaws
- 1980–1981, 1984: Oxford Cheetahs
- 1982–1985, 1989: Long Eaton Invaders
- 1982–1983: Reading Racers
- 1986: Newcastle Federation Specials
- 1987: Stoke Potters

Individual honours
- 1980: Highest league average
- 1984: National League Riders' runner-up

Team honours
- 1979: British League KO Cup Winner
- 1984: National League Champion

David Ernest Perks (born 16 December 1951) is a former speedway rider from England.

== Speedway career ==
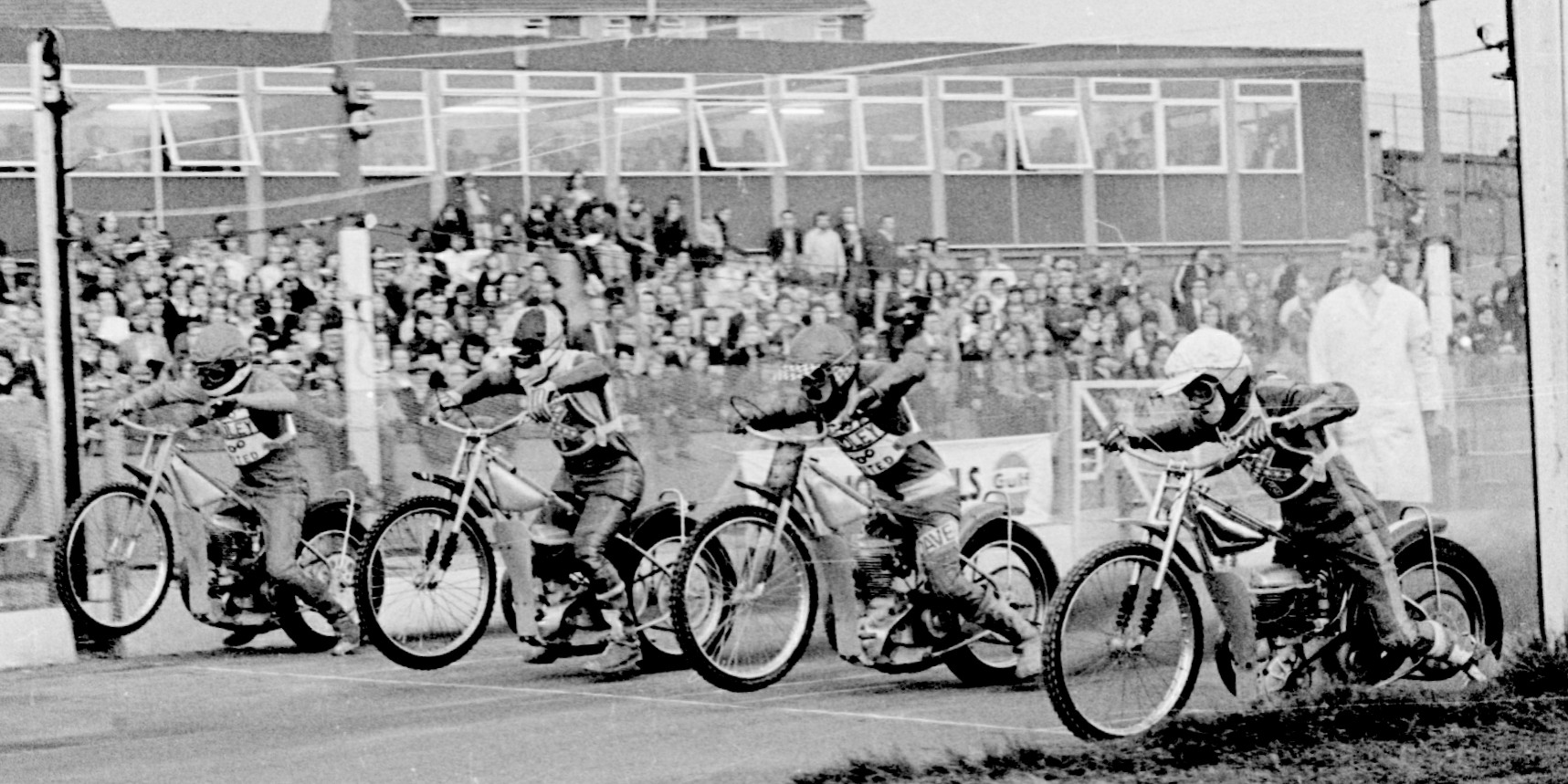
Perks (second from right) racing for Cradley at home to Oxford, British League 1975

Perks rode in the top two tiers of British Speedway from 1972 to 1987, riding for various clubs.

Perks began a cycle speedway career with a team called the Oldbury Lions and after one appearance for Scunthorpe Saints joined the Cradley Heathens in 1972. He won the Ivor Hughes Trophy for best novice during his inaugural season at Dudley Wood.

In 1980, Perks joined Oxford Cheetahs and topped the league averages during the 1980 National League season with a 10.82 season average before sustaining a serious back injury in July. He became the club captain and exceeded a ten point average again during the 1981 National League season. He returned to Long Eaton in 1982 but never reached the heights of his two years at Oxford.

In 1984, Perks won the silver medal at the National League Riders' Championship. Perks captained Newcastle Diamonds in 1986.
