= Brett Saunders =

Australian motorcycle speedway rider

- Born: 9 November 1961 (age 65); Sydney, Australia
- Nationality: Australian

Career history
- 1980: Nottingham Outlaws
- 1980: Workington Comets
- 1980–1981: Berwick Bandits
- 1981, 1993: Sheffield Tigers
- 1982–1992: Edinburgh Monarchs
- 1993: Middlesbrough Bears

Team honours
- 1980: National League Knockout Cup Winner

Brett Gavin Saunders (born 9 November 1961) is a former motorcycle speedway rider from Australia.

== Biography ==
Saunders, born in Sydney, began his British leagues career riding for Berwick Bandits during the 1980 National League season, although he did make an early season appearance for the Nottingham Outlaws. His debut season ended well after he participated in the Knockout Cup final and contributed to the winning side.

The following season, Saunders nearly won a second consecutive knockout cup with Berwick, reaching the final but losing to rivals Edinburgh Monarchs. In 1982, he then joined Edinburgh and improved his season average to 7.03.

Saunders became a regular with Edinburgh and also emerged as a fan's favourite, improving his season average to 7.46 by the end of the 1985 season. By 1988, he was starting his seventh consecutive season with the club and was rewarded with the captaincy and in 1989 he recorded a 8.24 career best average for the season.

After eleven years with the Scottish club, Saunders rode one final season in 1993, riding for Sheffield Tigers and Middlesbrough Bears on loan respectively.
