= Kelvin Mullarkey =

British speedway rider

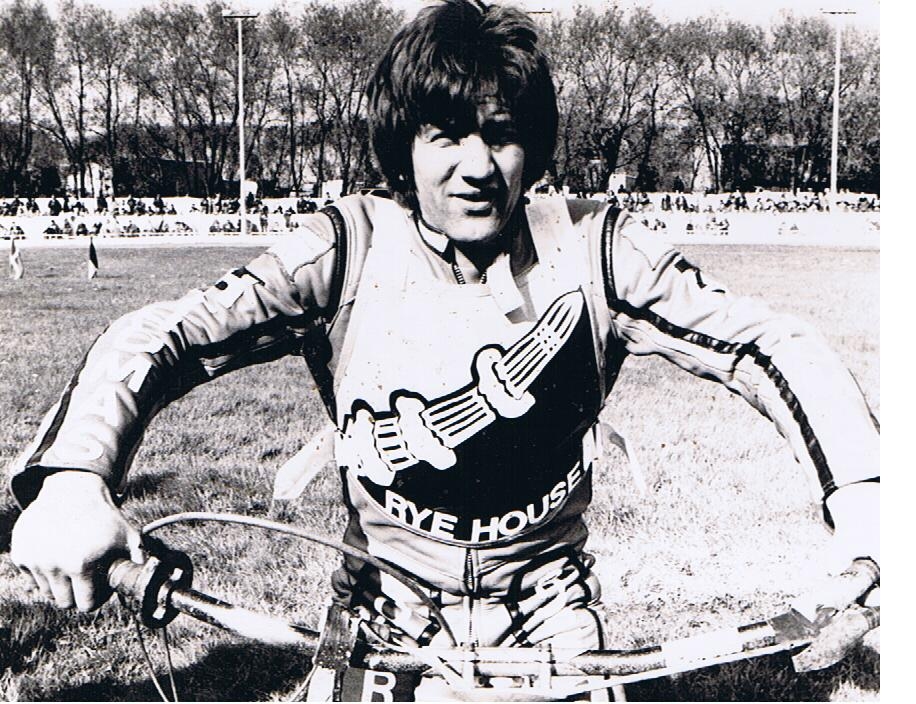
- Born: 29 March 1951; Chelmsford, Essex, England
- Died: 12 June 2018 (aged 67); West Row, Suffolk, England
- Nationality: British (English)

Career history
- 1971, 1973–1974: King's Lynn Stars
- 1973: Hull Vikings
- 1974: Weymouth Wizards
- 1975–1982, 1984–1985, 1989–1990: Rye House Rockets
- 1975: Cradley United
- 1977: Wolverhampton Wolves
- 1978–1979: Poole Pirates
- 1983–1984: Canterbury Crusaders
- 1986, 1988: Mildenhall Fen Tigers

Team honours
- 1980: National League Champion
- 1979: National League KO Cup Winner

Kelvin John Mullarkey (29 March 1951 – 12 June 2018) was a motorcycle speedway rider from England.

== Career ==
Mullarkey started his career with King's Lynn Stars in 1971.

Mullarkey spent most of his career with Rye House Rockets in the National League.

Mullarkey raced for nine consecutive seasons without missing a single meeting for Rye House from 1975 to 1983.

Mullarkey continued his career with the Canterbury Crusaders 1983 and 1984 seasons.
