= British League Division Two Knockout Cup =

- Formerly: National Trophy
- Sport: Speedway
- Founded: 1968
- Folded: 1994
- Replaced by: Premier League Knockout Cup
- Country: United Kingdom
- Last champion: Glasgow Tigers

The British League Division Two Knockout Cup (known as the National League Knockout Cup between 1976 and 1990 in line with the name of the league) was a motorcycle speedway Knockout Cup competition in the United Kingdom governed by the Speedway Control Bureau (SCB), in conjunction with the British Speedway Promoters' Association (BSPA). The teams from the second and lowest tier of league racing, the British League Division Two, took part. Similar competitions have been held within the leagues that succeeded the British League.

== Competition format ==
The competition was run on a knockout principle; teams drawn together race home and away matches against each other, with the aggregate score deciding the result. In the event of the aggregate score being level, the teams again raced home and away against each other until the tie was decided by an aggregate win.

== Winners ==
Year	Winners	Runners-up
British League Division Two Knockout Cup
1968	Canterbury Crusaders	Reading Racers
1969	Belle Vue Colts	Crewe Kings
1970	Ipswich Witches	Berwick Bandits
1971	Ipswich Witches	Crewe Kings
1972	Crewe Kings	Peterborough Panthers
1973	Boston Barracudas	Workington Comets
1974	Birmingham Brummies	Eastbourne Eagles
New National League Knockout Cup
1975	Eastbourne Eagles	Workington Comets
National League Knockout Cup
1976	Newcastle Diamonds	Berwick Bandits
1977	Eastbourne Eagles	Berwick Bandits
1978	Eastbourne Eagles	Rye House Rockets
1979	Rye House Rockets	Berwick Bandits
1980	Berwick Bandits	Middlesbrough Tigers
1981	Edinburgh Monarchs	Berwick Bandits
1982	Newcastle Diamonds	Ellesmere Port Gunners
1983	Exeter Falcons	Weymouth Wildcats
1984	Hackney Kestrels	Berwick Bandits
1985	Eastbourne Eagles	Ellesmere Port Gunners
1986	Eastbourne Eagles	Mildenhall Fen Tigers
1987	Eastbourne Eagles	Mildenhall Fen Tigers
1988	Hackney Kestrels	Wimbledon Dons
1989	Berwick Bandits	Poole Pirates
1990	Poole Pirates	Middlesbrough Bears
British League Division Two Knockout Cup
1991	Arena Essex Hammers	Glasgow Tigers
1992	Peterborough Panthers	Rye House Rockets
1993	Glasgow Tigers	Swindon Robins
1994	Glasgow Tigers	Edinburgh Monarchs

== See also ==
- Knockout Cup (speedway) for full list of winners and competitions
