= Bob Coles =

British motorcycle speedway rider

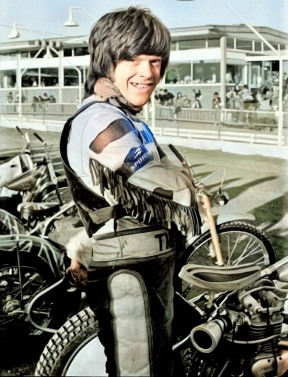
- Born: 12 February 1944 (age 82); Exeter, England
- Nationality: British (English)

Career history
- 1968-1969: Plymouth Devils
- 1970-1973, 1977 1981-1984: Exeter Falcons
- 1971: Romford Bombers
- 1972: West Ham Hammers
- 1972, 1985: Barrow Happy Faces/Blackhawks
- 1974-1976: Newport
- 1975-1978: Mildenhall Fen Tigers
- 1978: Bristol Bulldogs
- 1979-1981: Weymouth Wildcats
- 1979: Poole Pirates
- 1979: Cradley Heathens
- 1979: Hackney Hawks

Team honours
- 1983: National League KO Cup
- 1974, 1975: Spring Gold Cup

Robert John Coles (born 12 February 1944) is a former international motorcycle speedway rider from England. He earned one international cap for the England national speedway team.

== Biography ==
Coles first rode in the British speedway leagues for Plymouth Devils during the 1968 British League Division Two season. However, he was not a regular starter for the south west team until the following season in 1969.

In 1970, Plymouth dropped out of the league, so Coles switched to rival club Exeter Falcons in the British League (the highest division of the United Kingdom at the time). While at Exeter in 1971, he doubled up with Romford Bombers in division 2 and recorded an average of 8.06. However, his season was curtailed by an accident that saw him break his leg. The 1972 season was a turbulent one, in terms of his team place, he had a solid season for Exeter but in division 2 he followed the Romford relocation of the team to West Ham Hammers. Then in mid-season, West Ham folded and were replaced by Barrow Happy Faces (the name was courtesy of their sponsor at the time was Duckhams Oil - its happy face logo was prominently displayed on the team's race jackets). During the turmoil Coles recorded his best average to date, which was 8.61.

After four seasons with Exeter, Coles joined the Newport for the 1974 British League season and would double up for Mildenhall Fen Tigers in the National League. He stayed with Mildenhall from 1975 to 1978, where he topped the Mildenhall team averages during three of his four seasons with the club and became the club captain. Coles joined Weymouth Wildcats in 1980 but poor form as team captain in 1981 led to his transfer back to his old club Exeter. His form returned and he finally won a team honour during the 1983 National League season, when he helped Exeter win the Knockout Cup.

== Personal life ==
Coles' son Michael and grandson Connor both became professional speedway riders.
