= Denzil Kent =

Zimbabwean speedway rider (born 1961)

- Born: 26 October 1961 (age 65); Bulawayo, Rhodesia
- Nationality: Zimbabwean

Career history
- 1979: Oxford Cheetahs
- 1980–1983: Canterbury Crusaders
- 1980: Hull Vikings
- 1981–1982: Swindon Robins
- 1983–1984: Eastbourne Eagles

Team honours
- 1981: National League Pairs Champion

Denzil William Kent (born 26 October 1961) is a former motorcycle speedway rider from Zimbabwe.

== Career ==
Kent started his British leagues career during the 1979 National League season, but only rode a handful of times for Oxford and Glasgow. The following season, he signed for Canterbury Crusaders and rode the entire season recording an average of 6.64.

During the 1981 National League season, Kent improved his average to 7.75, to finish second in the Crusaders averages behind teammate and fellow Zimbabwean Mike Ferreira, who was the leagues top scorer. The pair went on to win the National League Pairs that season.

Kent continued to ride for Canterbury and topped the team's averages after the 1983 National League season. He also rode a few times for Eastbourne Eagles, in the top division called the British League at the time. His final season in Britain was with Eastbourne for the 1984 season.
