= Barry Thomas (speedway rider) =

British motorcycle speedway rider

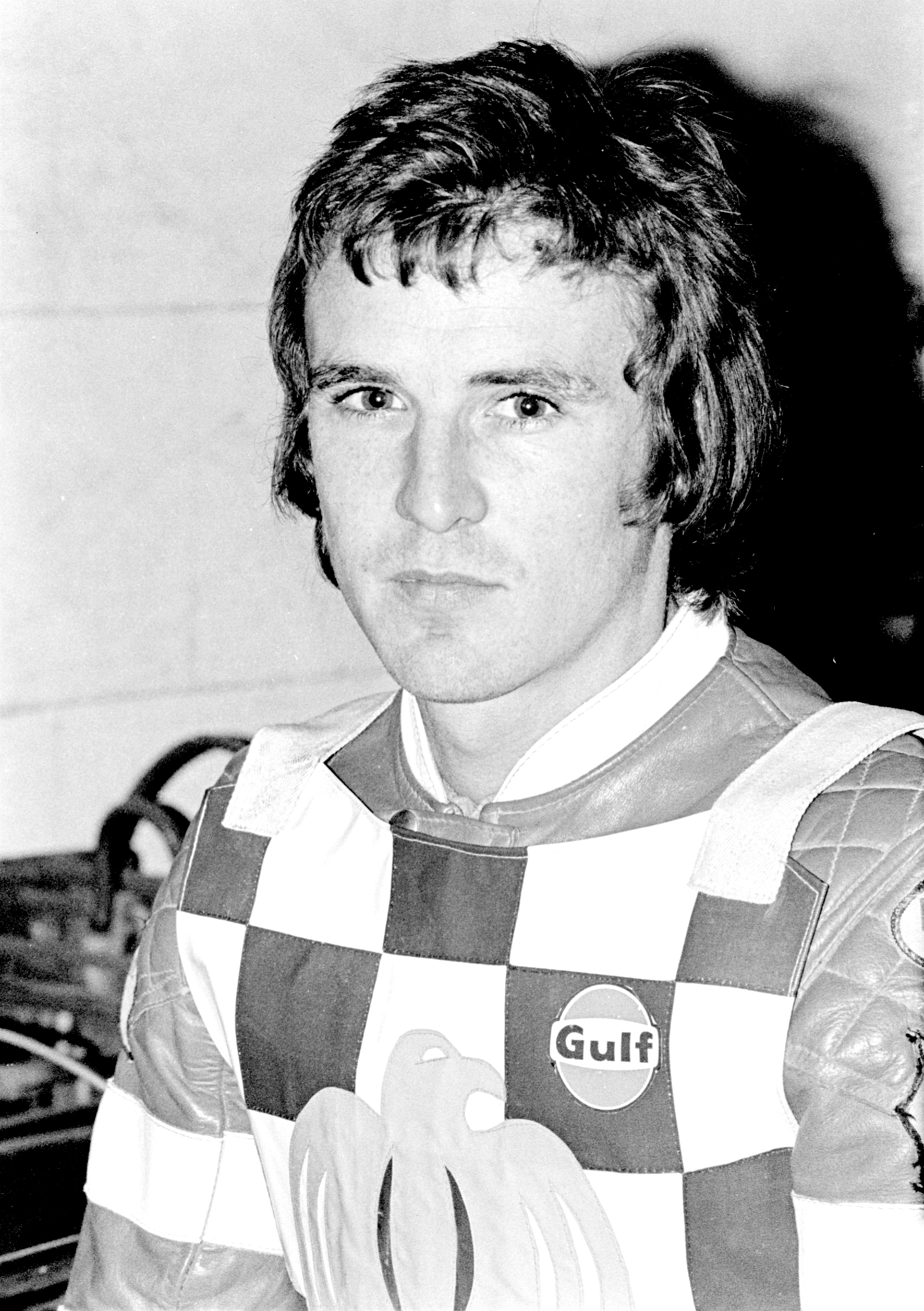
- Born: 29 October 1951 (age 75); Harrow, London, England
- Nickname: Thommo
- Nationality: British (English)

Career history
- 1969–1970: Canterbury Crusaders
- 1970–1983, 1984–1989: Hackney Hawks
- 1981–1983: Crayford Kestrels
- 1984: Reading Racers
- 1987: Rye House Rockets

Individual honours
- 1970: British Under-21 Champion
- 1972: Individual Gold Cup
- 1973, 1974: London Riders' Championship

Team honours
- 1971: KO Cup winner (tier 1)
- 1971, 1973: London Cup
- 1971, 1988: League champion (tier 2)
- 1984, 1988: KO Cup winner (tier 2)

Barry John Thomas (born 29 October 1951, Harrow, Middlesex) is a former motorcycle speedway rider. He spent 20 consecutive seasons at the Hackney Wick Stadium and earned 26 international caps for the England national speedway team.

== Career ==
Although originally preferring Junior Grasstrack, Thomas was first spotted during interval demonstration rides at the home of the West Ham Hammers with friend and rival Dave Jessup, following which, he signed for the Canterbury Crusaders. He progressed through to heat leader status in his very first season averaging 6.03 and in 1970 helped the Crusaders win the league title. The form shown during his first season prompted Hackney Hawks promoter Len Silver to buy him for the Hawks in 1970.

Thomas was given plenty of advice and help from Garry Middleton who helped him with any bike problems he had which resulted in him winning the British Junior Championship in that first season at Hackney.

Thomas also twice won the prestigious London Riders' Championship in 1973 and 1974 and became a regular representing his country in the test matches.

Thomas became Hackney Captain in 1975 and played a part in the signing of Polish Champion Zenon Plech. Although he never became one of the world’s leading riders and never reached a world final, he established himself as a successful British League heat leader. Fans enjoyed his racing style, scoring the majority of his points through overtaking opposing riders after characteristically poor starts. In 1979, he was awarded a testimonial in recognition of ten years’ service.

In 1981, after a couple of poor seasons, Thomas dropped into the National League with the Crayford Kestrels but continued his Hackney career as reserve. However, in 1984 Crayford were forced to close and the promotion moved the team to Hackney to compete in the National League as the Hackney Kestrels and Thommo returned full-time to Hackney again as captain.

In 1989, Thomas was awarded a record-breaking second testimonial, being the only rider to ever spend 20 consecutive years at one speedway club.

Thomas has since made one or two special appearances; most notably in 2001 he made a special one-off appearance for a Hackney team in a meeting at Rye House Stadium, having never ridden a bike for thirteen years and after a further ten years won a veteran speedway event at Lydd speedway in 2011.
