= Barney Kennett =

British motorcycle racer

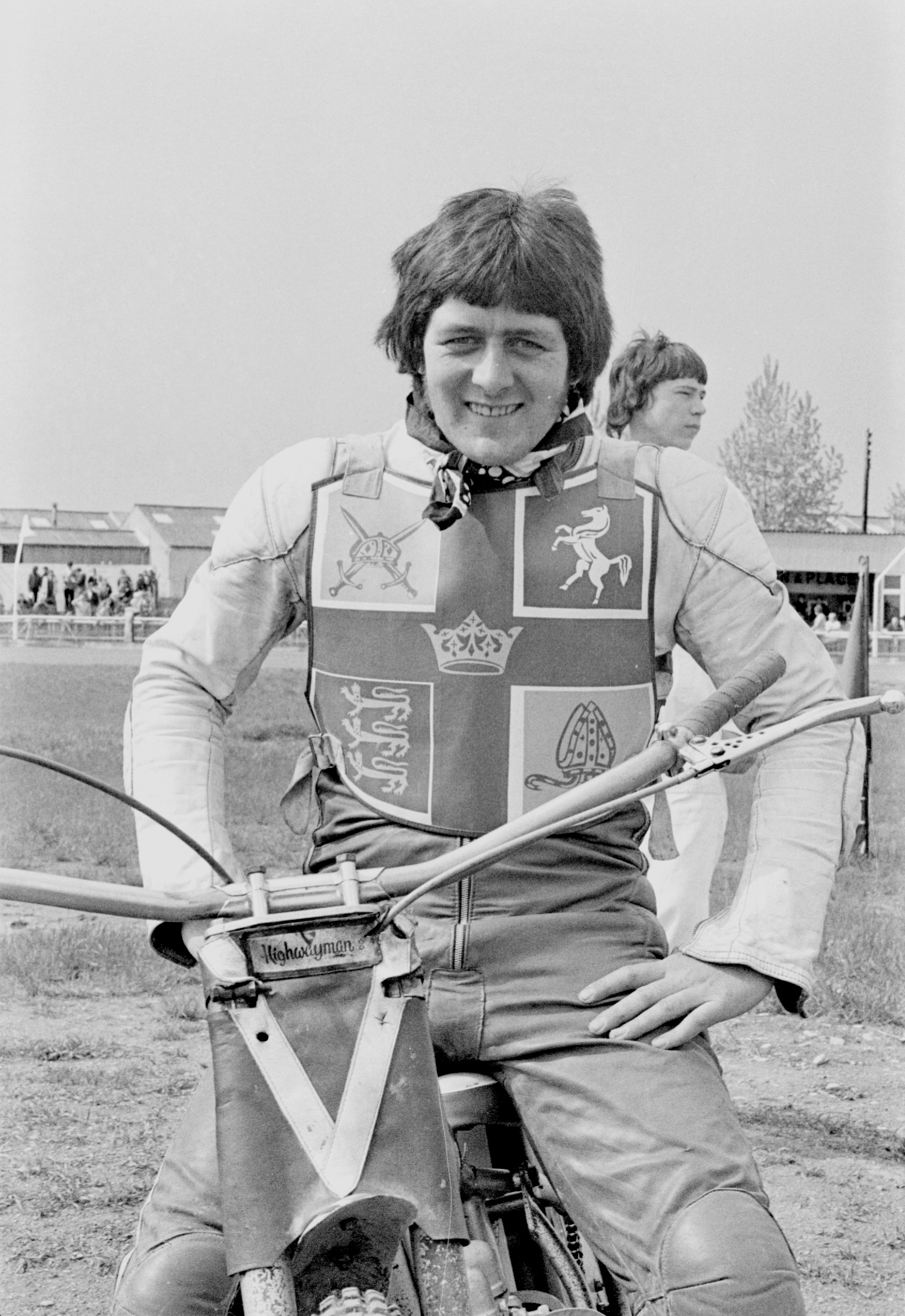
- Born: 15 March 1955 (age 71); Orpington, England
- Nationality: British (English)

Career history
- 1971–1984: Canterbury Crusaders
- 1973–1975: Hackney Hawks
- 1975: Oxford Rebels
- 1975–76: Newport
- 1978: Sheffield Tigers
- 1979: Belle Vue Aces
- 1979: Poole Pirates
- 1980–1983: Eastbourne Eagles
- 1980: Reading Racers

Team honours
- 1973: London Cup
- 1978: National League Champion

Brian Kennett better known as Barney Kennett (born 1955) is a former motorcycle speedway rider from England, who raced in the British National League. Born in Orpington, he is part of a speedway family which includes brothers Gordon Kennett and Dave Kennett, and nephew Edward Kennett.

== Career ==
Kennett was the longest serving rider for the Canterbury Crusaders, riding from 1971 to 1984.

In 1973, Kennett was runner-up to Peter Collins in the British Under 21 Speedway Championship and first repeseneted England in September 1973. The same year he became the most expensive Division Two rider in a transfer deal. Hackney Hawks boss Len Silver paid a record £1500.01 to Canterbury Crusaders, adding the 1p to beat the record paid previously by Oxford Rebels for Gordon Kennett, his brother, to transfer from Eastbourne Eagles. Despite this deal, Johnny Hoskins, boss of the Crusaders, wrote-in a loan-back clause, meaning that Canterbury Crusaders could still call on Kennett to ride for them.

== Post career ==
From 2022, Kennett became an ambassador for the World Speedway Riders Association (WSRA) and is known to members as "Mr Selfie", always ready with his phone camera to record events.
