= British League Division Two =

Second division British speedway racing league

- Sport: Speedway
- Founded: 1968
- Folded: 1994
- Competitors: Varied
- Country: United Kingdom

The British League Division Two was created in 1968 and was the second tier of speedway racing in the United Kingdom until the restructuring of British speedway in 1995. It was renamed the New National League in 1975 and the National League between 1976 and 1990.

== History ==
After the formation of the British League in 1965, riders wanting to break into teams found it more difficult to do so. The idea of forming a second division was suggested and in 1968 the idea became a reality when ten teams formed the league. The ten teams were: Belle Vue Colts, Berwick Bandits, Canterbury Crusaders, Crayford Highwaymen, Middlesbrough Teessiders, Nelson Admirals, Plymouth Devils, Rayleigh Rockets, Reading Racers and the Weymouth Eagles.

The league was renamed the New National League (to avoid confusion with the original National League) in 1975 after promoters of the Division Two tracks decided to form their own league after they became dissatisfied with the way the league was being run by the British Speedway Promoters' Association and the name was shortened to the National League in 1976. It was again named the British League Division Two in 1991 and a system of promotion and relegation was introduced between the British League and the British League Division Two. The league existed until 1994 when the top two league divisions of speedway in the UK were amalgamated for the 1995 and 1996 seasons. In 1997 the Premier League became the second tier when the Elite League was formed.

== Champions ==
Season	Champions	Second
1968	Belle Vue Colts	Nelson Admirals
1969	Belle Vue Colts	Reading Racers
1970	Canterbury Crusaders	Eastbourne Eagles
1971	Eastbourne Eagles	Bradford Northern
1972	Crewe Kings	Boston Barracudas
1973	Boston Barracudas	Workington Comets
1974	Birmingham Brummies	Eastbourne Eagles
in 1975, it was renamed the New National League
1975	Birmingham Brummies	Newcastle Diamonds
from 1976-1990, it was named the National League
1976	Newcastle Diamonds	Ellesmere Port Gunners
1977	Eastbourne Eagles	Rye House Rockets
1978	Canterbury Crusaders	Newcastle Diamonds
1979	Mildenhall Fen Tigers	Rye House Rockets
1980	Rye House Rockets	Newcastle Diamonds
1981	Middlesbrough Tigers	Weymouth Wildcats
1982	Newcastle Diamonds	Mildenhall Fen Tigers
1983	Newcastle Diamonds	Mildenhall Fen Tigers
1984	Long Eaton Invaders	Mildenhall Fen Tigers
1985	Ellesmere Port Gunners	Poole Wildcats
1986	Eastbourne Eagles	Poole Wildcats
1987	Eastbourne Eagles	Mildenhall Fen Tigers
1988	Hackney Kestrels	Poole Pirates
1989	Poole Pirates	Wimbledon Dons
1990	Poole Pirates	Middlesbrough Bears
in 1991, the name reverted to British League Division Two
1991	Arena Essex Hammers	Glasgow Tigers
1992	Peterborough Panthers	Berwick Bandits
1993	Glasgow Tigers	Long Eaton Invaders
1994	Glasgow Tigers	Long Eaton Invaders

== See also ==
- List of United Kingdom Speedway League Champions
