= List of Leicester Lions riders =

The following is a list of motorcycle speedway riders who have been part of the Leicester Lions first team in league or cup matches, excluding guest riders, both in the team's original era of 1968-1983, and from the team's revival in 2011.

== 1968-1983 ==
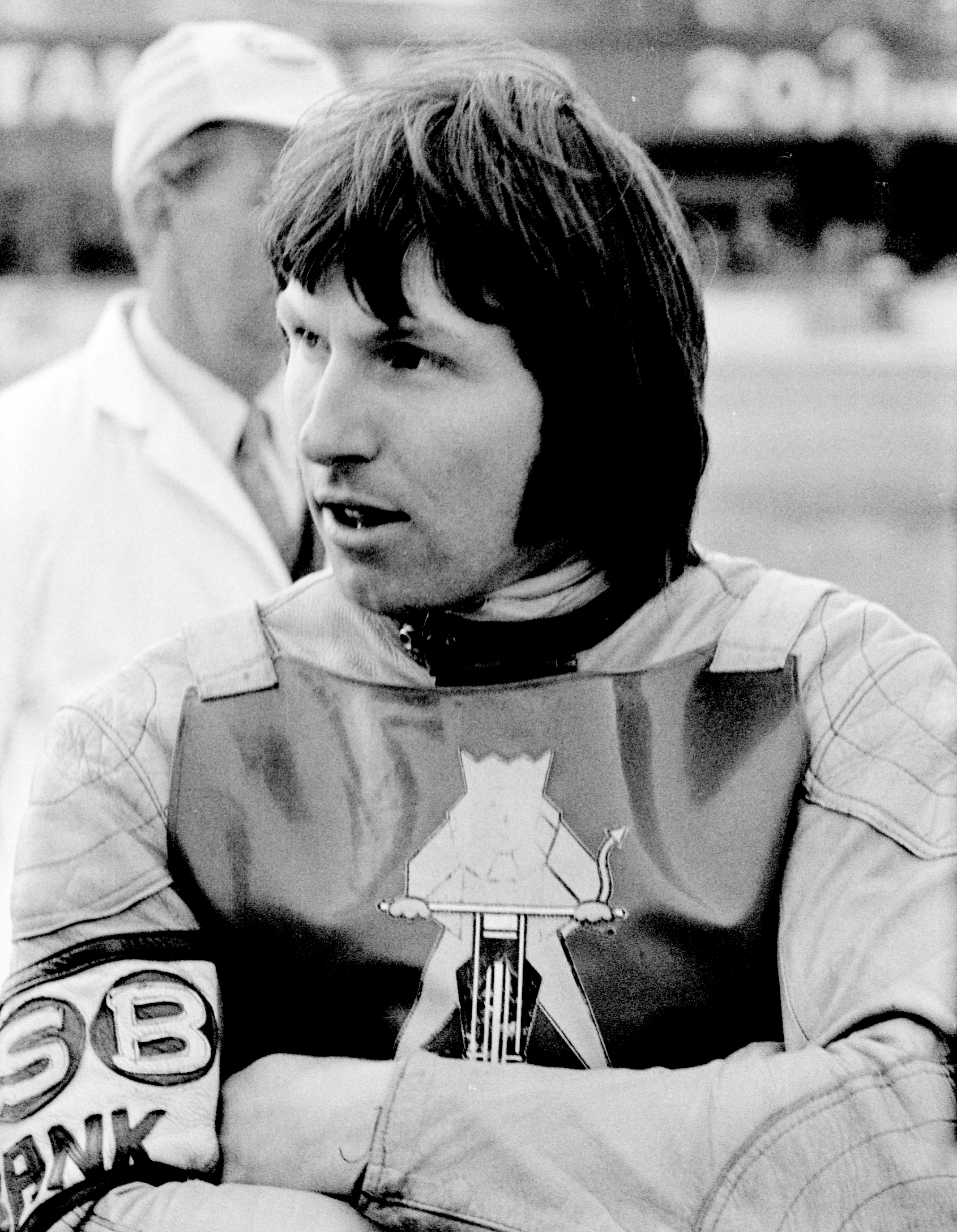
Ray Wilson

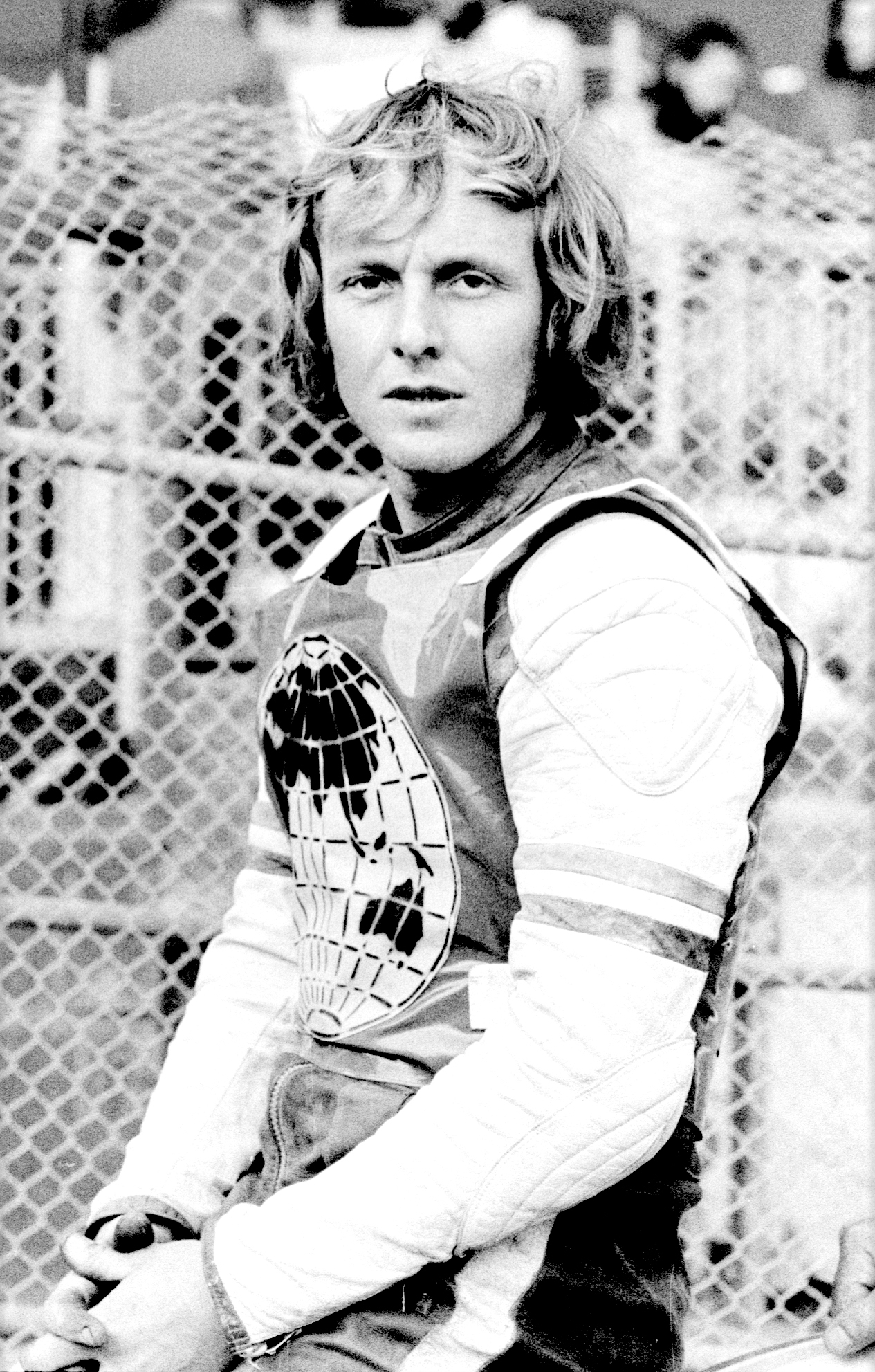
John Boulger

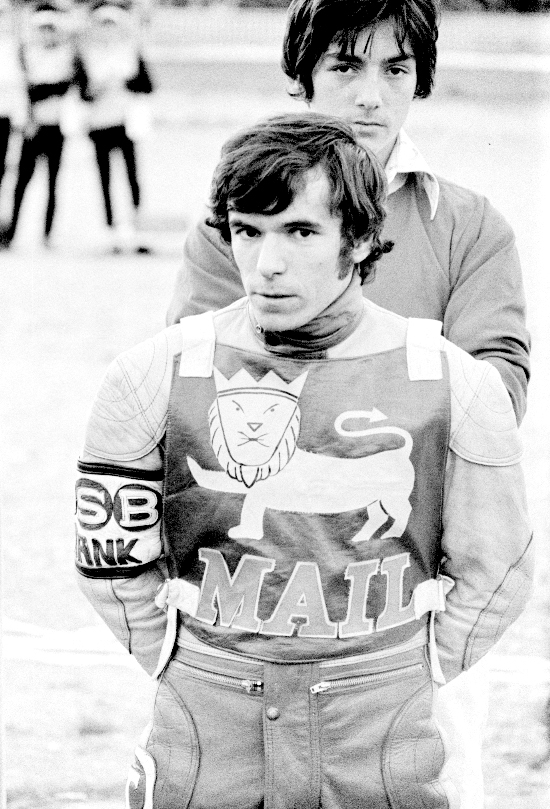
Dave Jessup

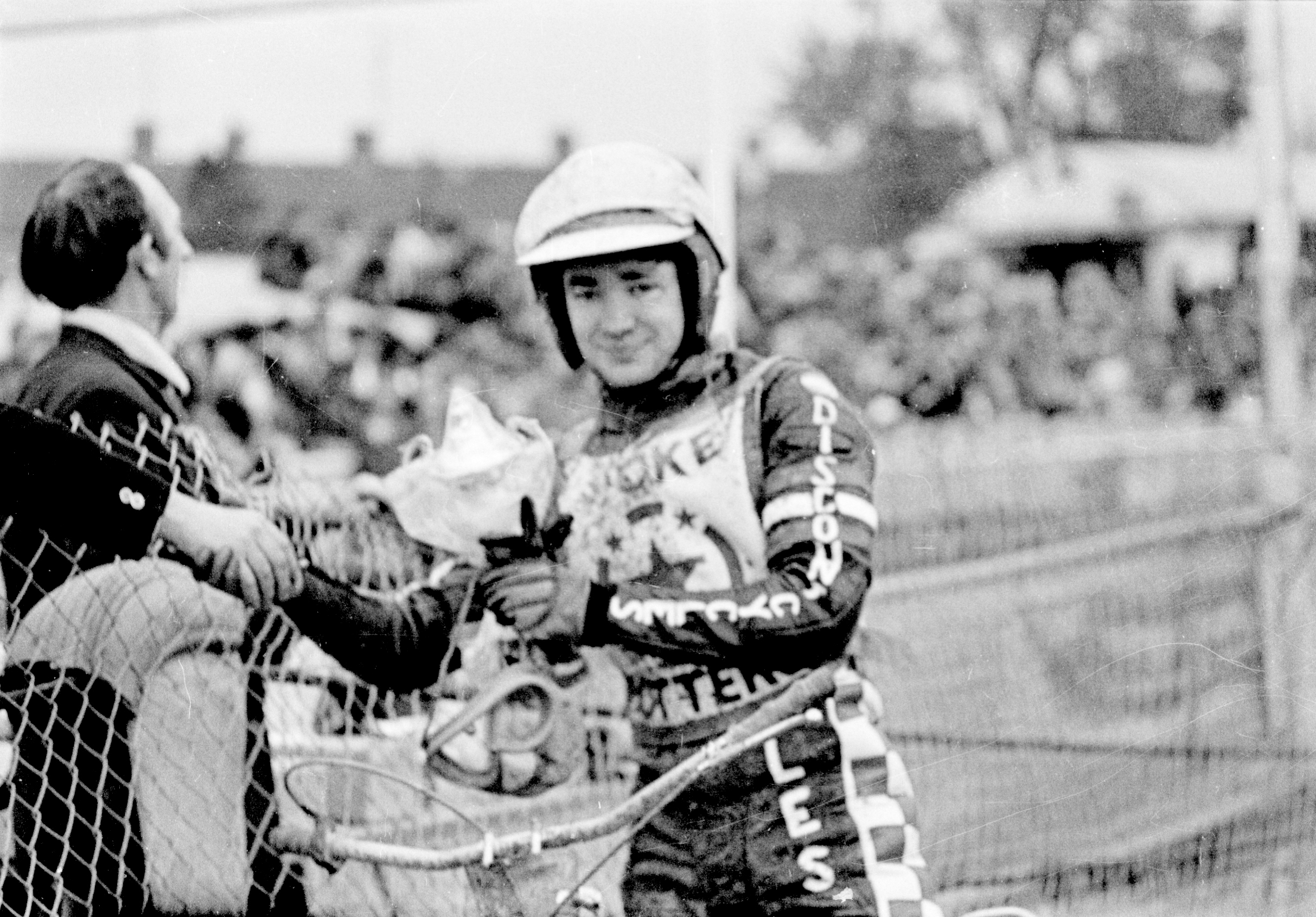
Les Collins

- Geoff Ambrose (England) 1972-1973
- Frank Auffret (England) 1972-1975
- Ray Bales (England) 1977-1978
- Malcolm Ballard (England) 1974
- Phil Bass 1978
- Mick Bell (England) 1974
- Tom Black (New Zealand) 1974
- David Blackburn (England) 1983
- Ernst Bøgh (Denmark) 1976
- John Boulger (Australia) 1968-1973, 1977-1979
- Malcolm Brown (England) 1969-1974
- Ian Clark (England) 1980-1981
- Les Collins (England) 1980-1983
- Neil Collins (England) 1982-1983
- Colin Cook (England) 1979-1983
- Bob Cooper (England) 1974-1975
- Mark Courtney (England) 1980-1983
- Alan Cowland (England) 1970-1972
- Dene Davies (Australia) 1968
- Reidar Eide (Norway) 1976-1977
- Alan Emerson (England) 1976
- Lars Ericsson (Sweden) 1978
- Mike Farrell (Australia) 1979-1980
- Tony Featherstone 1976
- Mark Fiora (Australia) 1983
- Garry Flood (Australia) 1972
- Brian Foote (England) 1968-1973
- Bruce Forrester (England) 1969-1975
- Adi Funk (Austria) 1977
- Bobby Garrad (England) 1980
- Tom Godal (Norway) 1978-1979
- Rolf Gramstad (Norway) 1980-1981
- Derek Harrison (England) 1982
- John Hart (England) 1968-1970
- Markku Helminen (Finland) 1977
- Robert Henry (England) 1979
- Phil Herne (Australia) 1981-1983
- Andrzej Huszcza (Poland) 1980-1981
- Finn Jensen (Denmark) 1981-1983
- Dave Jessup (England) 1972-1975
- DeWayne Keeter (United States) 1969
- Mike Lanham (England) 1983
- Tom Leadbitter (England) 1968-1971
- Neil Leeks (England) 1978
- Les Leisk (Australia) 1977
- Brian Leonard (England) 1975
- Robert Lightfoot (England) 1980-1983
- Tony Lomas (England) 1975-1976
- George Major (England) 1968-1969
- Steen Mastrup (Denmark) 1983
- John McNeill (Australia) 1977-1979
- Colin Meredith (England) 1978
- Anders Michanek (Sweden) 1968
- Garry Middleton (Australia) 1977
- Roger Mills (England) 1968
- Eric Monaghan (England) 1983
- Bernd Odermatt (Germany) 1980
- Joe Owen (England) 1982-1983
- Tommy Pettersson (Sweden) 1977
- Graham Plant (England) 1968-1971
- Bolesław Proch (Poland) 1977
- Steve Regeling (Australia) 1980-1983
- Jerzy Rembas (Poland) 1978
- Chris Robins (England) 1977-1978
- Malcolm Shakespeare (England) 1971-1973
- Pete Smith (England) 1981
- Norman Storer (England) 1968-1975
- Chris Sully (England) 1978-1980
- Mark Summerfield (England) 1982
- Grzegorz Szczepanik (Poland) 1976
- Ila Teromaa (Finland) 1975-1979
- Pepe Teromaa (Finland) 1976-1977
- John Titman (Australia) 1978-1981
- Chris Turner (England) 1979
- Doug Underwood (Australia) 1975-1977
- Phil Vance (Wales) 1980-1982
- Keith White (England) 1973-1974
- Vic White (England) 1968
- Ray Wilson (England) 1968-1976

== 2011 onwards ==
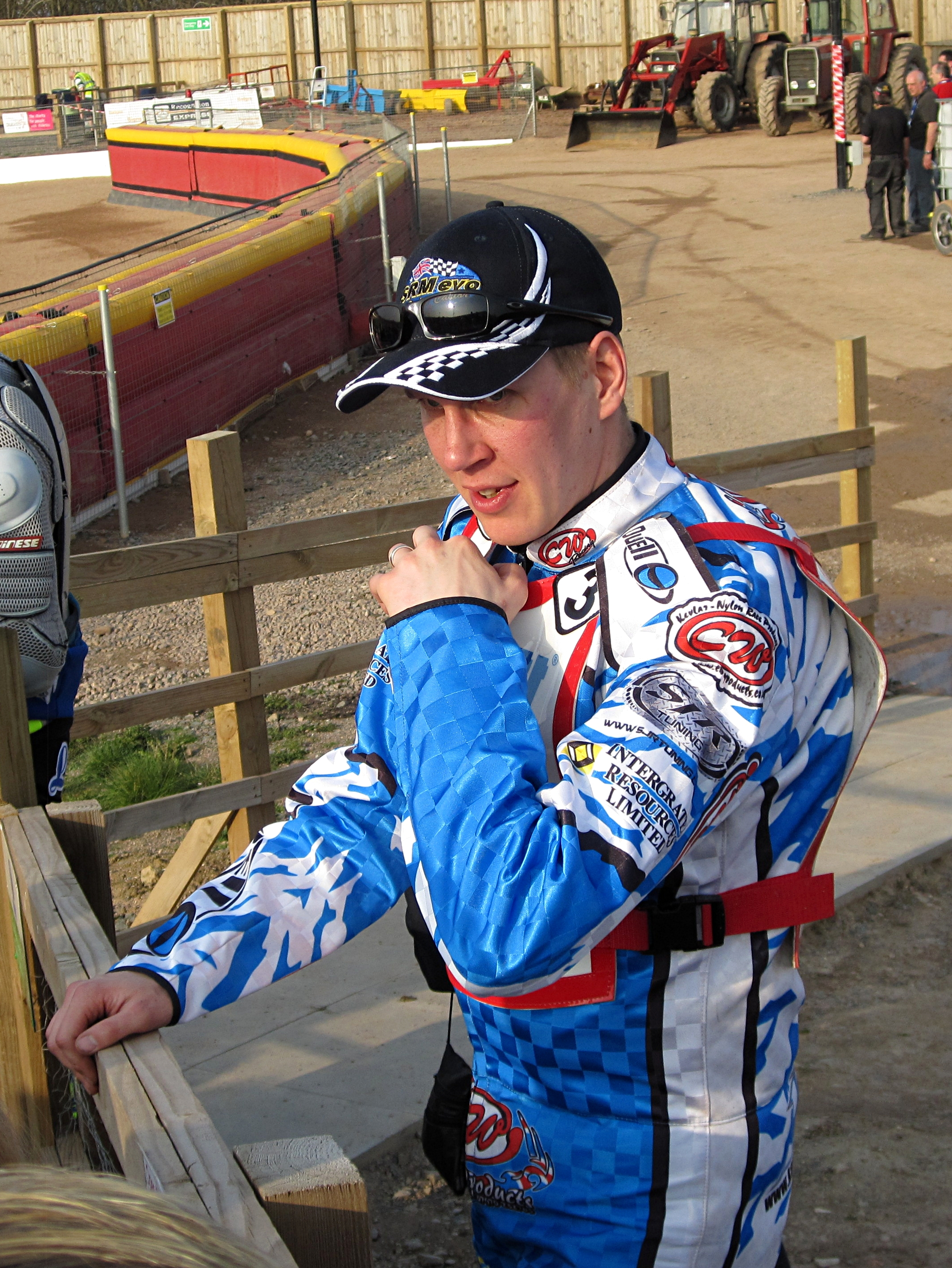
Kauko Nieminen

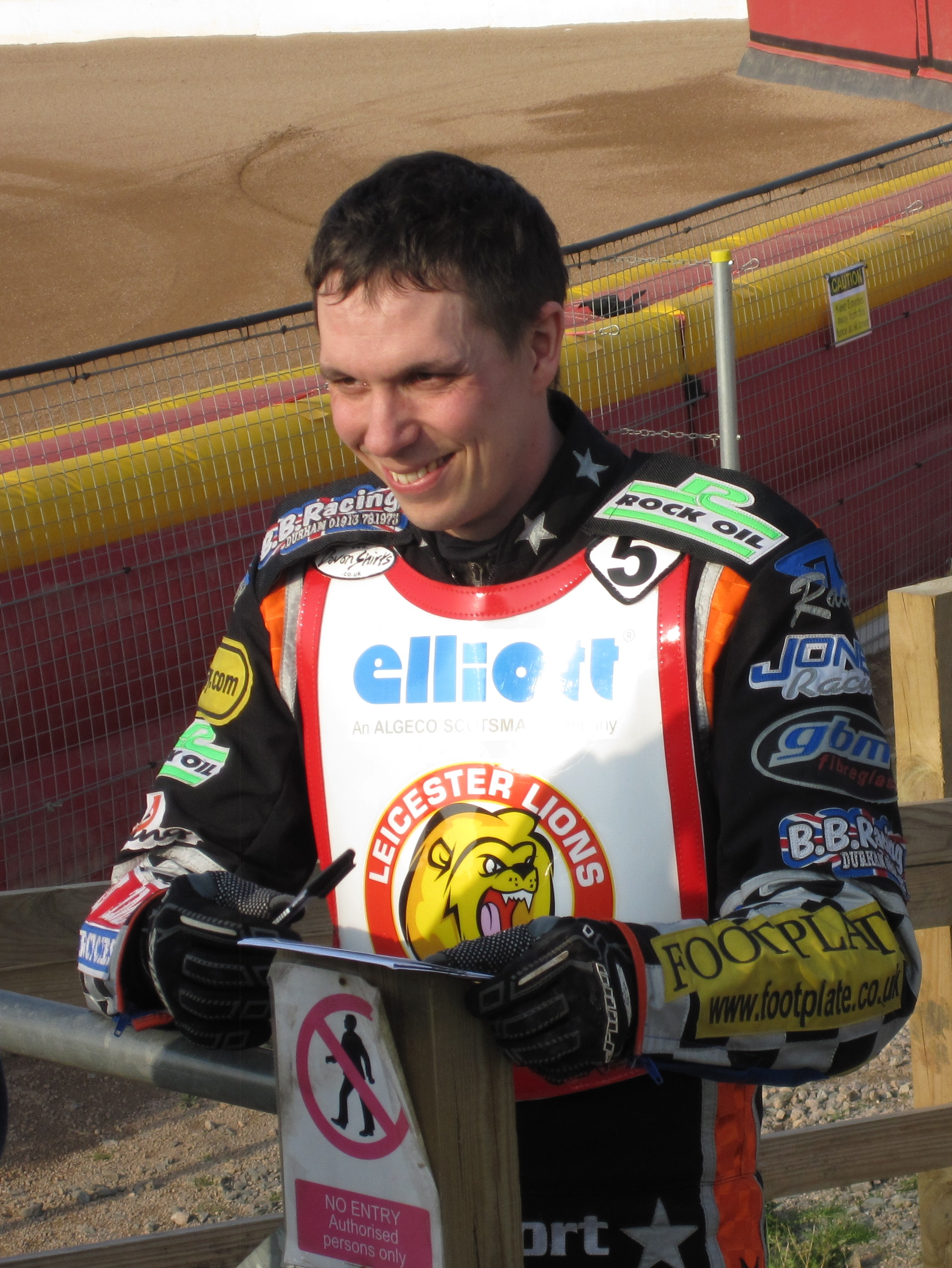
Magnus Karlsson

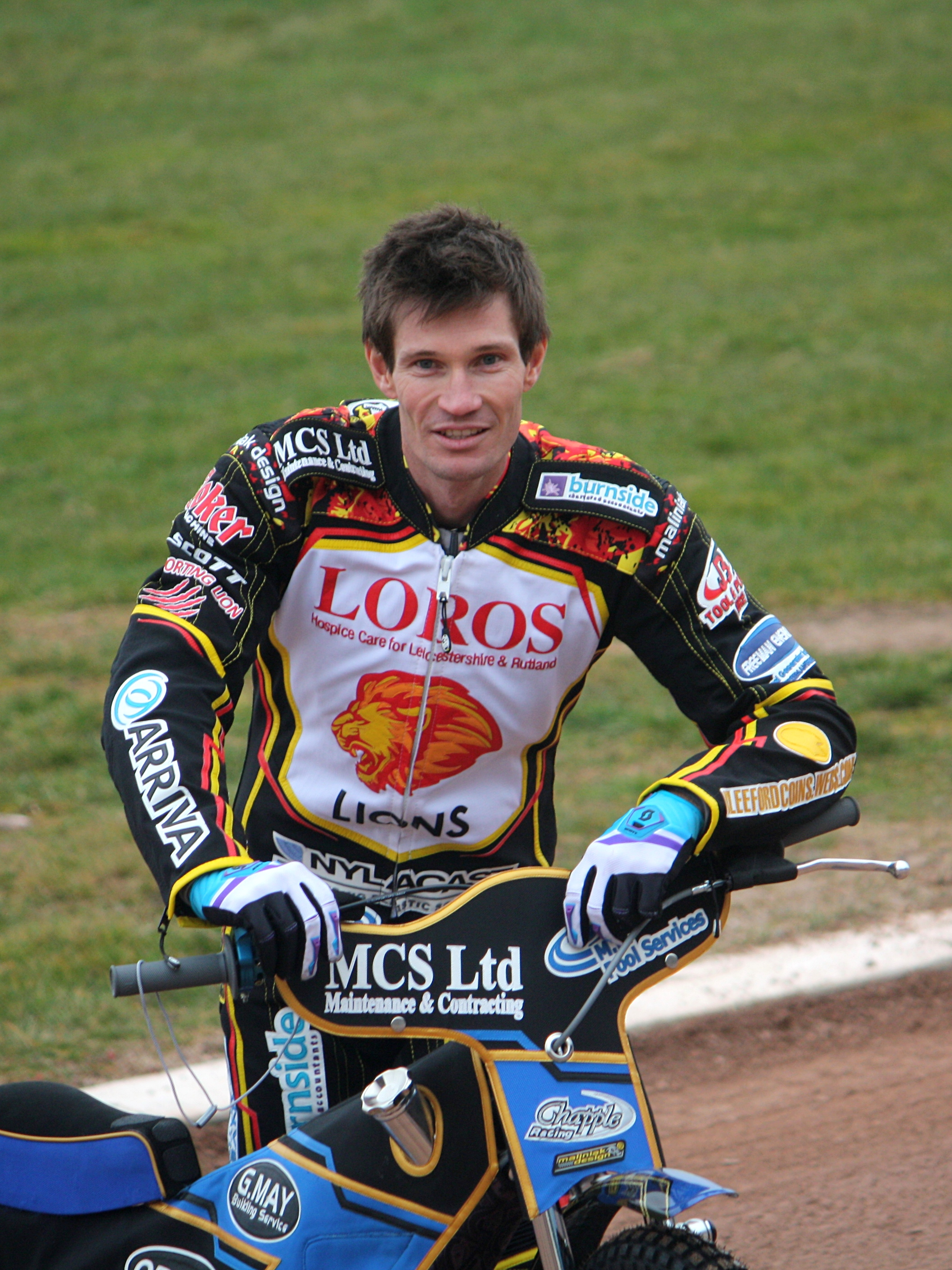
Jason Doyle

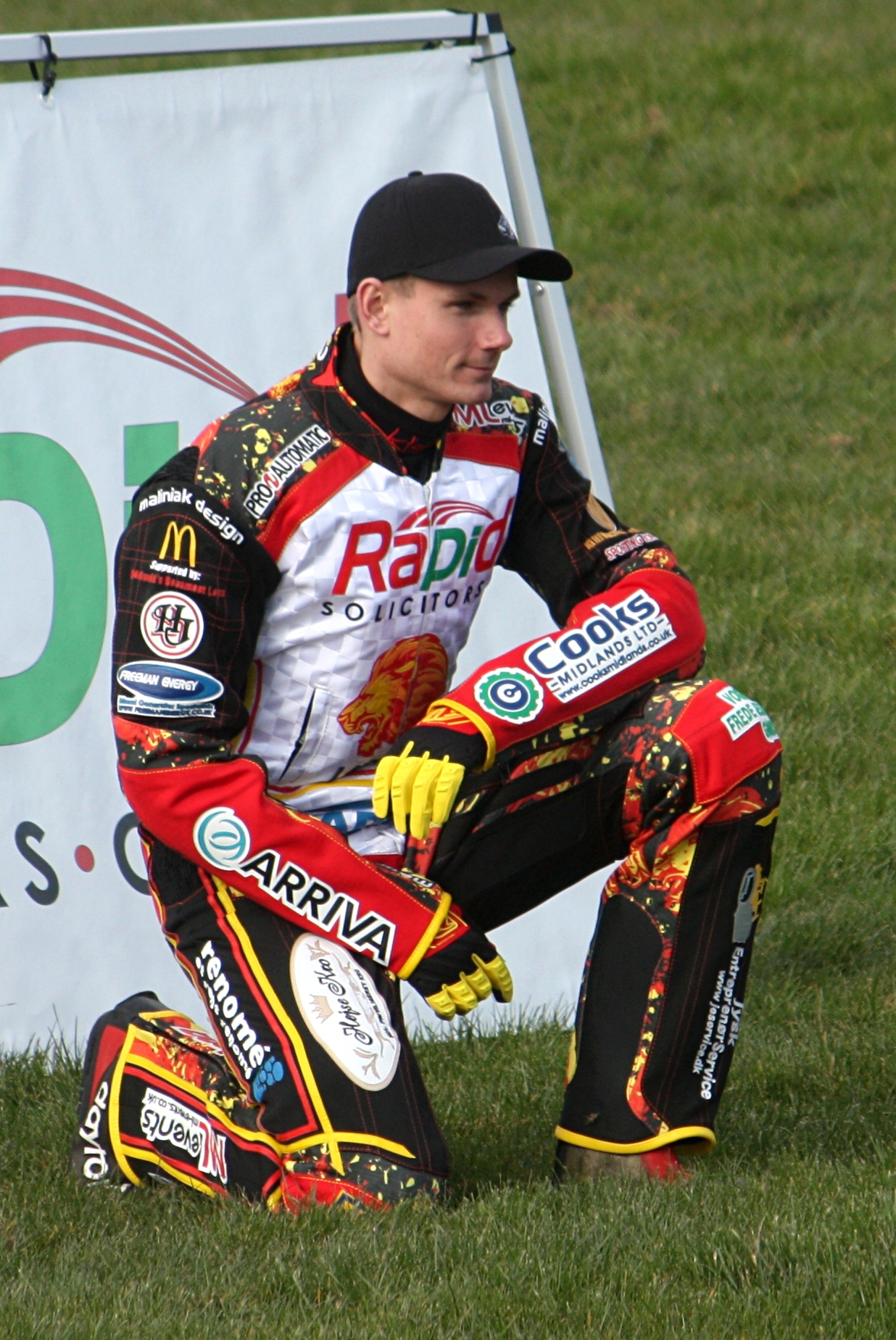
Patrick Hougaard

- Hans Andersen (Denmark) 2018
- Josh Auty (England) 2015–2017, 2018
- Danny Ayres (England) 2017
- Henning Bager (Denmark) 2011
- Josh Bates (England) 2014, 2017, 2019
- Viktor Bergström (Sweden) 2011
- Kenneth Bjerre (Denmark) 2018
- Lasse Bjerre (Denmark) 2012–2013, 2014
- Lewis Blackbird (England) 2012–2013
- Ilya Bondarenko (Russia) 2011
- Robert Branford (Australia) 2013
- Lewis Bridger (England) 2015
- Krzysztof Buczkowski (Poland) 2014
- Max Clegg (England) 2014
- Jamie Courtney (England) 2011
- Sergey Darkin (Russia) 2011
- Kevin Doolan (Australia) 2013
- Ryan Douglas (Australia) 2019
- Jason Doyle (Australia) 2014–2015
- Alex Edberg (Sweden) 2013
- Linus Eklöf (Sweden) 2012, 2013
- Jason Garrity (England) 2011
- Kacper Gomólski (Poland) 2017
- Jan Graversen (Denmark) 2011-2013
- Richard Hall (England) 2011
- Patrick Hougaard (Denmark) 2014, 2016
- Kyle Hughes (England) 2012
- Magnus Karlsson (Sweden) 2011-2012
- Danny King (England) 2017–2018
- Nicolai Klindt (Denmark) 2014, 2016
- Mads Korneliussen (Denmark) 2014
- Todd Kurtz (Australia) 2018
- Simon Lambert (England) 2012, 2015
- Joe Lawlor (England) 2019
- Ludvig Lindgren (Sweden) 2016
- Peter Ljung (Sweden) 2014
- Jari Mäkinen (Finland) 2012
- Sam Masters (Australia) 2015
- Mikkel Michelsen (Denmark) 2015
- Connor Mountain (England) 2018, 2019
- Kyle Newman (England) 2017–2018
- Scott Nicholls (England) 2018, 2019
- Simon Nielsen (Denmark) 2012–2013
- Kauko Nieminen (Finland) 2011-2013
- Kim Nilsson (Sweden) 2017
- John Oliver (Australia) 2011
- Bjarne Pedersen (Denmark) 2015
- Ellis Perks (England) 2019
- Tom Perry (England) 2014
- Krystian Pieszczek (Poland) 2018
- Ty Proctor (Australia) 2019
- Paweł Przedpełski (Poland) 2017
- Erik Riss (Germany) 2017
- Stuart Robson (England) 2018
- Adam Roynon (England) 2013
- James Sarjeant (England) 2013, 2018
- Paul Starke (England) 2016
- Simon Stead (England) 2014
- Aaron Summers (Australia) 2016
- Richard Sweetman (Australia) 2011
- Piotr Świderski (Poland) 2015
- Jack Thomas (England) 2019
- Mathieu Trésarrieu (France) 2011
- Sebastian Ułamek (Poland) 2016
- Grzegorz Walasek (Poland) 2015–2016
- Davey Watt (Australia) 2016
- Ricky Wells (United States) 2018
- Richie Worrall (England) 2019
- Szymon Woźniak (Poland) 2015–2016
- Charles Wright (England) 2011, 2018
