= 1971 British League Division Two season =

British motorcycle speedway season

- League: British League Division Two
- No. of competitors: 17
- Champions: Eastbourne Eagles
- Knockout Cup: Ipswich Witches
- Individual: John Louis
- Highest average: John Louis
- Division/s above: British League (Div 1)

The 1971 British League Division Two season was the second tier/division motorcycle speedway in Great Britain.

== Summary ==
The league continued with 17 teams in its fourth season despite Reading Racers moving up to Division One and two teams dropping out because there were three new entrants to the league.

Doncaster Dragons disbanded for good, with the promotion and some of the riders moving to Birmingham and re-forming the Birmingham Brummies, who had last raced in 1957. The Crayford Highwayman also dropped out and the Middlesbrough Teessiders changed their name to Teesside Teessiders. Birmingham were one of the new entrants along with Sunderland Stars (who last raced in 1964 as the Saints). Hull Vikings were the final new entrant when Ian Thomas brought speedway back to Hull, to race at the Boulevard Stadium.

Eastbourne Eagles won their first league title since their 1959 Southern Area League success. Despite losing their leading rider Dave Jessup to division 1, the Eastbourne Eagles triumphed by bringing in new signing Malcolm Ballard to support the Kennett brothers Gordon and Dave.

== Final table ==
| Pos | Team | PL | Home | | | | | Away | | | | | Pts |
| Pos | Team | PL | W | D | L | F | A | W | D | L | F | A | Pts |
|---|---|---|---|---|---|---|---|---|---|---|---|---|---|
| 1 | Eastbourne Eagles | 32 | 15 | 0 | 1 | 800 | 438 | 7 | 3 | 6 | 594 | 649 | 47 |
| 2 | Bradford Northern | 32 | 16 | 0 | 0 | 778 | 468 | 5 | 1 | 10 | 592 | 651 | 43 |
| 3 | Ipswich Witches | 32 | 14 | 1 | 1 | 746 | 495 | 6 | 2 | 8 | 599 | 646 | 43 |
| 4 | Boston Barracudas | 32 | 15 | 0 | 1 | 744 | 503 | 3 | 3 | 10 | 568 | 670 | 39 |
| 5 | Rayleigh Rockets | 32 | 12 | 2 | 2 | 688 | 555 | 6 | 0 | 10 | 589 | 654 | 38 |
| 6 | Hull Vikings | 32 | 12 | 2 | 2 | 703 | 542 | 4 | 0 | 12 | 589 | 657 | 34 |
| 7 | Crewe Kings | 32 | 15 | 1 | 0 | 826 | 418 | 1 | 0 | 15 | 475 | 766 | 33 |
| 8 | Berwick Bandits | 32 | 16 | 0 | 0 | 784.5 | 461.5 | 0 | 0 | 16 | 514 | 734 | 32 |
| 9 | Rochdale Hornets | 32 | 14 | 0 | 2 | 700 | 544 | 2 | 0 | 14 | 477 | 767 | 32 |
| 10 | Long Eaton Rangers | 32 | 13 | 2 | 1 | 690 | 555 | 0 | 1 | 15 | 505 | 735 | 29 |
| 11 | Birmingham Brummies | 32 | 13 | 1 | 2 | 704 | 541 | 0 | 2 | 14 | 463 | 784 | 29 |
| 12 | Romford Bombers | 32 | 12 | 0 | 4 | 700 | 542 | 1 | 0 | 15 | 519.5 | 724.5 | 26 |
| 13 | Teesside Teessiders | 32 | 12 | 0 | 4 | 707.5 | 536.5 | 1 | 0 | 15 | 483.5 | 762.5 | 26 |
| 14 | Canterbury Crusaders | 32 | 12 | 2 | 2 | 705 | 540 | 0 | 0 | 16 | 458 | 789 | 26 |
| 15 | Workington Comets | 32 | 11 | 0 | 5 | 701 | 547 | 1 | 1 | 14 | 533 | 703 | 25 |
| 16 | Peterborough Panthers | 32 | 11 | 1 | 4 | 691 | 553 | 0 | 0 | 16 | 482 | 764 | 23 |
| 17 | Sunderland Stars | 32 | 9 | 1 | 6 | 635 | 600 | 0 | 0 | 16 | 398 | 847 | 19 |

== Fixtures and results ==
| Home \ Away | BER | BIR | BOS | BRA | CAN | CK | EAS | HV | IPS | LE | PET | RAY | RH | ROM | SUN | TEE | WOR |
|---|---|---|---|---|---|---|---|---|---|---|---|---|---|---|---|---|---|
| Berwick | | 58–20 | 41–36 | 42–36 | 46–32 | 56–21 | 49–29 | 45–33 | 46–32 | 45–33 | 49–29 | 49–29 | 60–18 | 56–22 | 51–27 | 45.5–32.5 | 46–32 |
| Birmingham | 42–36 | | 43–35 | 42–35 | 44–34 | 50–28 | 39–39 | 41–37 | 47–30 | 44–34 | 52–26 | 36–42 | 36–42 | 43–35 | 52–26 | 51–27 | 42–35 |
| Boston | 52–26 | 50–28 | | 44–33 | 47–31 | 53–25 | 45–33 | 42–36 | 37–41 | 43–35 | 45–33 | 41–37 | 44–34 | 45–33 | 56–22 | 55–23 | 45–33 |
| Bradford | 45–33 | 54–24 | 54–24 | | 57–21 | 54–24 | 52–26 | 41–37 | 47–31 | 53–25 | 41–37 | 43–35 | 46–32 | 46–32 | 54–23 | 48–30 | 43–34 |
| Canterbury | 45–33 | 54–24 | 39–39 | 42–36 | | 48–30 | 36–41 | 35–42 | 39–39 | 45–33 | 47–31 | 40–38 | 46–32 | 44–34 | 56–22 | 47–30 | 42–36 |
| Crewe | 48–30 | 62–16 | 50–28 | 43–35 | 55–23 | | 54–24 | 46–32 | 46–32 | 55–19 | 56–22 | 49–29 | 55–23 | 54–24 | 61–17 | 53–25 | 39–39 |
| Eastbourne | 49–29 | 57–21 | 49–28 | 42–33 | 58–20 | 54–23 | | 46–32 | 46–31 | 54–23 | 53–25 | 36–40 | 44–34 | 50–28 | 59–19 | 58–20 | 45–32 |
| Hull | 42–36 | 39–39 | 35–43 | 39–39 | 45–33 | 47–31 | 41–37 | | 34–44 | 46–32 | 43–35 | 45–33 | 51–27 | 47–30 | 51–27 | 55–23 | 43–33 |
| Ipswich | 42–36 | 55–22 | 43–34 | 37–41 | 48–29 | 45–32 | 39–39 | 42–35 | | 49–29 | 49–29 | 40–38 | 58–19 | 45–33 | 55–22 | 44–34 | 55–23 |
| Long Eaton | 45–33 | 39–39 | 39–39 | 40–38 | 47–31 | 50–27 | 36–41 | 42–36 | 41–37 | | 45–33 | 40–38 | 48–29 | 40–38 | 53–25 | 40–38 | 45–33 |
| Peterborough | 44–34 | 50–28 | 39–39 | 37–41 | 54–24 | 47–30 | 38–39 | 35–43 | 29–48 | 41–37 | | 43–35 | 48–30 | 42–36 | 57–21 | 44–33 | 43–35 |
| Rayleigh | 44–34 | 42–36 | 36–42 | 43–35 | 43–35 | 38–39 | 39–39 | 45–33 | 39–39 | 44–34 | 41–37 | | 53–25 | 45–30 | 44–34 | 49–29 | 43–34 |
| Rochdale | 45–33 | 43–35 | 40–38 | 52–26 | 44–34 | 41–37 | 41–37 | 40–38 | 41–37 | 50–28 | 56–22 | 37–40 | | 41–37 | 50–28 | 38–40 | 41–34 |
| Romford | 43–35 | 46–32 | 44–34 | 33–45 | 49–29 | 48–30 | 37–40 | 40–38 | 36–42 | 45–33 | 41–36 | 37–40 | 50–28 | | 51–27 | 51–27 | 49–26 |
| Sunderland | 46–32 | 40–38 | 32–39 | 42–36 | 42–36 | 40–38 | 31–46 | 38–40 | 43–35 | 38–38 | 49–28 | 36–41 | 37–40 | 42–36 | | 41–37 | 38–40 |
| Teesside | 54–24 | 45–33 | 44–34 | 37–41 | 58–20 | 42–35 | 35–43 | 43–35 | 38–40 | 43–34 | 48–30 | 36–42 | 44–33 | 47.5–30.5 | 49–28 | | 44–34 |
| Workington | 48–30 | 50–28 | 42–36 | 36–42 | 52–26 | 53–25 | 37–41 | 36–42 | 37–41 | 40–38 | 49–29 | 46–32 | 47–31 | 37–41 | 48–30 | 43–35 | |

Legend: Blue = home team win; Yellow = draw; Red = away team win.

== Top five riders (league averages) ==
| | Rider | Nat | Team | C.M.A. |
|---|---|---|---|---|
| 1 | John Louis | (England) | Ipswich | 11.29 |
| 2 | Alan Knapkin | (England) | Bradford Northern | 10.26 |
| 3 | Alan Wilkinson | (England) | Rochdale | 10.15 |
| 4 | Reg Wilson | (England) | Hull | 9.93 |
| 5 | Peter Collins | (England) | Rochdale | 9.83 |

== British League Division Two Knockout Cup ==
The 1971 British League Division Two Knockout Cup (sponsored by the Speedway Express) was the fourth edition of the Knockout Cup for tier two teams. Ipswich Witches were the winners of the competition for the second successive year.

First round

| Date | Team one | Score | Team two |
|---|---|---|---|
| 29/04 | Long Eaton | 46-31 | Birmingham |
| 24/05 | Birmingham | 39-39 | Long Eaton |
| 30/04 | Rochdale | 47-31 | Hull |
| 05/05 | Hull | 38-39 | Rochdale |

Second round

| Date | Team one | Score | Team two |
|---|---|---|---|
| 12/06 | Ipswich | 57-21 | Peterborough |
| 11/06 | Peterborough | 33-45 | Ipswich |
| 11/06 | Workington | 46-31 | Sunderland |
| 06/06 | Sunderland | 37-31 | Workington |
| 06/06 | Eastbourne | 47-31 | Canterbury |
| 12/06 | Canterbury | 39-39 | Eastbourne |
| 07/06 | Crewe | 54-24 | Berwick |
| 12/06 | Berwick | 50-28 | Crewe |
| 09/06 | Bradford | 47-31 | Teesside |
| 10/06 | Teesside | 38-40 | Bradford |
| 11/06 | Rochdale | 45-33 | Long Eaton |
| 10/06 | Long Eaton | 43-35 | Rochdale |
| 06/06 | Boston | 49-28 | Romford |
| 12/06 | Romford | 42-36 | Boston |

Quarter-finals

| Date | Team one | Score | Team two |
|---|---|---|---|
| 29/07 | Ipswich | 43-35 | Rayleigh |
| 24/07 | Rayleigh | 37-41 | Ipswich |
| 23/07 | Workington | 51-27 | Eastbourne |
| 25/07 | Eastbourne | 45-31 | Workington |
| 19/07 | Crewe | 47-31 | Bradford |
| 28/07 | Bradford | 46-32 | Crewe |
| 23/07 | Rochdale | 41-37 | Boston |
| 18/07 | Boston | 40-38 | Rochdale |

Semi-finals

| Date | Team one | Score | Team two |
|---|---|---|---|
| 16/08 | Crewe | 49-29 | Rochdale |
| 29/08 | Workington | 38-40 | Ipswich |
| 02/09 | Ipswich | 50-28 | Workington |
| 03/09 | Rochdale | + | Crewe |

+ rained off, tie awarded to Ipswich

=== Final ===
First leg

11 October 1971

| Crewe Kings Phil Crump 10 John Jackson 6 Jack Millen 6 Dai Evans 6 Garry Moore 5 Dave Parry 4 Barry Meeks 4 | 41 – 37 | Ipswich Witches John Louis 14 Tony Davey 11 Peter Prinsloo 9 Pete Bailey 2 Clive Noy 1 Ted Howgego 0 Ray Watkins 0 |

British Railways Sports Ground

Second leg

14 October 1971

| Ipswich Witches John Louis 12 Tony Davey 12 Peter Prinsloo 9 Pete Bailey 8 Clive Noy 7 Ted Howgego 5 Ray Watkins 2 | 55 – 23 | Crewe Kings John Jackson 7 Jack Millen 7 Phil Crump 6 Barry Meeks 2 Dai Evans 1 Garry Moore 1 Dave Parry 0 |

Foxhall Stadium

Ipswich were declared Knockout Cup Champions, winning on aggregate 92–64.

== Leading final averages ==
| | Rider | Nat | Team | C.M.A. |
|---|---|---|---|---|
| 1 | John Louis | (England) | Ipswich | 11.31 |
| 2 | Alan Knapkin | (England) | Bradford Northern | 10.17 |
| 3 | Alan Wilkinson | (England) | Rochdale | 10.08 |
| 4 | Tony Davey | (England) | Ipswich | 9.93 |
| 5 | Malcolm Mackay | (England) | Workington | 9.81 |

== Riders' Championship ==
John Louis won the Rider's Championship, held at Hackney Wick Stadium on 2 October.

| Pos. | Rider | Pts | Total |
|---|---|---|---|
| 1 | (England) John Louis | 3 3 2 3 3 | 14 |
| 2 | (England) Malcolm Shakespeare | 2 3 3 3 2 | 13 |
| 3 | (Guernsey) Hugh Saunders | 3 3 2 2 2 | 12 |
| 4 | (England) Peter Collins | ex 2 3 3 3 | 11 |
| 5 | (Australia) Phil Crump | 1 1 3 3 3 | 11 |
| 6 | (England) Arthur Price | 3 2 fx 2 3 | 10 |
| 7 | (England) George Major | 2 1 2 2 1 | 8 |
| 8 | (England) Reg Wilson | r 2 f 2 2 | 6 |
| 9 | (England) Russ Dent | 1 1 3 1 0 | 6 |
| 10 | (England) Doug Wyer | 0 3 2 0 0 | 5 |
| 11 | (Scotland) Ross Gilbertson | 3 r 1 1 0 | 5 |
| 12 | (England) Dave Baugh | 2 0 1 1 1 | 5 |
| 13 | (England) Malcolm Mackay | 2 f 1 0 1 | 4 |
| 14 | (England) Bruce Forrester | 1 0 0 1 1 | 3 |
| 15 | (England) Kevin Holden | 0 2 f 0 0 | 2 |
| 16 | (England) Roger Mills (res) | 2 | 2 |
| 17 | (England) Malcolm Ballard | r 1 r | 1 |
| 18 | (England) Richard Greer (res) | 0 | 0 |

- f=fell, r-retired, ex=excluded, ef=engine failure

== Riders' final averages ==
Berwick

- Doug Wyer 9.69
- Maury Robinson 7.97
- Andy Meldrum 7.24
- Alistair Brady 7.03
- Peter Kelly 5.77
- Alan Paynter 5.42
- Bobby Campbell 4.75
- Jim Beaton 4.14
- George Beaton 3.36

Birmingham

- George Major 8.90
- Terry Shearer 8.40
- Archie Wilkinson 6.27
- Chris Harrison 6.08
- Malcolm Corradine 5.47
- Cliff Emms 5.45
- Ian Wilson .4.65
- Gunther 'Hec' Haslinger 4.41

Boston

- Arthur Price 8.92
- Jim Ryman 8.32
- Carl Glover 7.27
- Russ Osborne 6.65
- Jack Bywater 6.48
- Tony Featherstone 6.04
- Vic Cross 5.39
- Ray Bales 5.28
- Graham Jones 2.50

Bradford

- Alan Knapkin 10.17
- Alf Wells 9.02
- Dave Baugh 8.49
- Dave Schofield 7.54
- Robin Adlington 7.13
- Sid Sheldrick 5.15
- Alan Bridgett 4.82
- Brian Murray 4.43
- Peter Thompson 4.35
- Stan Dewhurst 1.91

Canterbury

- Ross Gilbertson 8.93
- Graham Banks 8.03
- Dave Piddock 6.75
- Graeme Smith 6.32
- Graeme Stapleton 6.29
- Phil Pratt 6.09
- Ted Hubbard 5.44
- Bob Tabet 4.76
- Barney Kennett 4.09
- John Hammond 4.00
- Mike Barkaway 2.84

Crewe

- Phil Crump 8.98
- John Jackson 8.32
- Dai Evans 7.72
- Jack Millen 6.61
- Ian Bottomley 6.48
- Barry Meeks 5.71
- Garry Moore 5.31
- Dave Parry 5.21

Eastbourne

- Malcolm Ballard 8.74
- Gordon Kennett 8.70
- Dave Kennett 7.49
- Laurie Sims 7.10
- Reg Trott 6.99
- Roger Johns 6.89
- Bobby McNeil 6.82
- Mac Woolford 6.67

Hull

- Reg Wilson 9.69
- Tony Childs 9.22
- George Devonport 7.71
- Colin Tucker 6.20
- Robin Amundson 5.94
- Dennis Wasden 5.14
- Pete Boston 4.47
- Ian Bottomley 4.39
- Peter Baldock 3.29

Ipswich

- John Louis 11.31
- Tony Davey 9.93
- Pete Bailey 8.20
- Peter Prinsloo 5.25
- Clive Noy 5.10
- Ron Bagley 5.01
- Ted Howgego 4.85
- Ted Spittles 4.32
- Stan Pepper 3.70

Long Eaton

- Malcolm Shakespeare 9.80
- Roger Mills 9.41
- Geoff Bouchard 8.26
- Gil Farmer 4.42
- Peter Wrathall 4.42
- Phil Whittaker 4.36
- Steve Bass 3.77
- Ian Champion 3.45
- Gerry Scott 2.47

Peterborough

- Andy Ross 9.02
- Richard Greer 7.95
- Roy Carter 6.73
- John Davis 5.85
- Joe Hughes 5.81
- John Stayte 5.59
- Alan Witt 5.51
- Pete Saunders 5.47
- Brian Clark 5.13

Rayleigh

- Hugh Saunders 9.41
- Geoff Maloney 7.38
- Bob Young 6.67
- Allan Emmett 6.44
- Nigel Rackett 6.38
- Dingle Brown 5.93
- Terry Stone 4.65
- Dave "Tiger" Beech 4.33

Rochdale

- Alan Wilkinson 10.08
- Peter Collins 9.80
- Paul Tyrer 7.92
- Ken Moss 5.41
- Graham Drury 5.40
- Colin Goad 4.69
- Robbie Gardner 4.66
- Terry Kelly 4.27
- Paul Callaghan 2.51
- Clive Johnson 2.34

Romford

- Kevin Holden 8.94
- Bob Coles 8.06
- Brian Foote 8.00
- Stan Stevens 6.60
- Mike Sampson 6.14
- Mike Vernam 6.11
- Colin Sanders 5.78
- Charlie Benham 5.22
- Ian Gills 4.78
- Terry Shearer 4.59
- Bruce Edgar 3.00

Sunderland

- Russ Dent 8.16
- George Barclay 7.21
- John Goodall 6.43
- Peter Wrathall 4.92
- Alan Mackie 4.42
- Brian Whaley 4.13
- John Lynch 4.05
- Gerry Richardson 4.00
- John Knock 3.83

Teesside

- Bruce Forrester 8.33
- Tim Swales 7.04
- Dave Durham 7.00
- Bob Jameson 6.31
- Terry Lee 6.09
- Frank Auffret 5.92
- Pete Reading 5.45
- Tony Swales 4.97
- Dene Davies 4.62
- Mick Moore 4.46

Workington

- Malcolm MacKay 9.81
- Taffy Owen 8.60
- Lou Sansom 7.87
- Ken Vale 5.89
- Dave Kumeta 4.92
- Kym Amundson 4.71
- Bernie Hornby 4.32
- Geoff Penniket 4.15
- Chris Blythe 3.93
- Steve Watson 3.57

== See also ==
- List of United Kingdom Speedway League Champions
- Knockout Cup (speedway)
