= 1973 British League season =

British speedway season

- League: British League
- No. of competitors: 18
- Champions: Reading Racers
- Knockout Cup: Belle Vue Aces
- Individual: Ivan Mauger
- London Cup: Hackney Hawks
- Midland Cup: Wolverhampton Wolves
- Spring Gold Cup: King's Lynn Stars
- Highest average: Anders Michanek
- Division/s below: British League (Div 2)

The 1973 British League season was the 39th season of the top tier of motorcycle speedway in the United Kingdom and the ninth season of the British League.

== Summary ==
Glasgow Tigers relocated to become Coatbridge Tigers.

The Reading Racers won their first title, ending the dominance of Belle Vue Aces who could only finish in sixth place. Swede Anders Michanek was in imperious form, going undefeated at Reading Stadium (which was in its final year as a venue). He finished with an 11.36 average ahead of the four time world champion Ivan Mauger on 11.29. In addition to Michanek the Reading team was boosted by high scoring from Norwegian Dag Lövaas and Australian Geoff Curtis. In a sensational finish to the 1973 Knockout Cup final Reading were beaten by Belle Vue in a run-off for the Cup after an aggregate draw over two legs.

Reading's success had a sour note after the season had finished when Geoff Curtis returned to Australia for the Australian season and was killed in a race at the Sydney Showground in December.

== Final table ==
Pos	Team	PL	W	D	L	Pts
1	Reading Racers	34	25	1	8	51
2	Sheffield Tigers	34	22	3	9	47
3	King's Lynn Stars	34	20	3	11	43
4	Leicester Lions	34	21	0	13	42
5	Ipswich Witches	34	19	2	12	41
6	Belle Vue Aces	34	19	1	14	39
7	Wolverhampton Wolves	34	18	1	15	37
8	Exeter Falcons	34	16	3	15	35
9	Halifax Dukes	34	16	2	16	34
10	Newport Wasps	34	16	0	18	32
11	Oxford Rebels	34	14	2	18	30
12	Wimbledon Dons	34	14	1	19	29
13	Swindon Robins	34	13	3	18	29
14	Poole Pirates	34	13	2	19	28
15	Coventry Bees	34	13	0	21	26
16	Hackney Hawks	34	11	4	19	26
17	Coatbridge Tigers	34	12	1	21	25
18	Cradley United	34	7	4	23	18

M = Matches; W = Wins; D = Draws; L = Losses; Pts = Total Points

== Fixtures and results ==
Home \ Away	BV	COV	CH	EX	GLA	HAC	HAL	IPS	KL	LEI	NW	OX	PP	RR	SHE	SWI	WIM	WOL
Belle Vue		59–19	50–27	42–36	38–37	55–23	51–27	51–27	51–27	54–22	52–26	53–25	48–30	55–23	38–40	46–32	55–22	44–34
Coventry	42–35		32–46	46–32	52–26	41–37	58–20	36–42	42–36	43–35	40–38	50–28	41–36	30–48	40–38	41–37	42–36	37–41
Cradley	39–39	45–33		36–42	37–41	41–37	42–35	39–39	40–38	33–45	44–34	38–40	35–43	30–48	36–41	48–30	32–45	36–42
Exeter	28–50	55–23	45–32		59–19	56–22	42–36	39–39	39–38	35–43	56–22	49–29	45–33	46–32	49–29	50–28	46–32	41–37
Glasgow/Coatbridge	34–40	42–35	47–31	40–37		52–26	38–40	46–32	41–37	42–36	46–31	49–29	36–42	40–37	39–39	37–41	43–35	38–40
Hackney	41–37	46–31	39–39	44–34	43–35		43–35	39–39	30–48	41–37	45–33	48–30	36–42	28–50	39–39	48–30	38–40	52–26
Halifax	44–34	42–36	44–34	40–38	47–31	49–29		46–32	39–39	43–35	40–38	46–32	36–42	41–37	37–40	45–33	43–35	40–38
Ipswich	45–33	48–30	48–30	46–32	49–29	40–37	53–25		51–27	42–36	48–30	51–27	47–31	44–34	42–34	47–31	55–23	44–34
King's Lynn	45–33	47–31	47–31	58–20	47–31	40–36	37–41	40–38		48–30	39–38	55–23	43–35	36–42	41–37	41–37	54–24	45–33
Leicester	46–32	47–31	52–25	52–26	50–28	49–29	49–29	42–36	36–42		44–33	49–29	51–27	46–32	45–33	42–36	45–33	43–35
Newport	41–37	56–22	54–24	42.5–34.5	43–35	51–27	56–22	49–29	45–33	53–25		43–34	57–21	33–45	44–34	48–30	52–26	40–38
Oxford	40–38	40–38	59–19	45–33	50–28	43–35	48–29	37–41	39–39	44–34	51–26		42–36	30–48	38–40	44–34	47–30	52–26
Poole	29–49	54–24	42–36	37–41	47–31	54–24	48–30	43–35	36–42	38–40	45–33	39–39		36–42	38–40	38–40	44–34	43–35
Reading	46–32	52–26	53–25	58–20	55–22	47–31	59–19	50–28	39–39	44–34	47–31	45–33	41–37		37–41	47–31	54–24	41–37
Sheffield	48–30	46–32	47–31	53–25	59–19	57–21	39–39	56–22	52–26	45–33	57–21	56–22	50–28	43–35		51–27	51–26	51–26
Swindon	42–35	44–34	39–39	39–39	43–35	37–41	42–36	40–38	33–45	35–43	40–38	40–38	39–39	35–43	44–34		42–36	41–37
Wimbledon	46–32	41–37	46–32	42–36	52–26	39–39	41–37	39–38	35–43	35–43	45–33	55–23	45–33	35–43	45–33	46–32		38–40
Wolverhampton	55–23	40–38	43–35	39–39	42–36	45–33	45–33	40–38	45–33	43–35	40–38	41–37	44–34	38–40	42–36	38–40	40–37	

Legend: Blue = home team win; Yellow = draw; Red = away team win.

== Top ten riders (league averages) ==
	Rider	Nat	Team	C.M.A.
1	Anders Michanek	(Sweden)	Reading	11.55
2	Ivan Mauger	(New Zealand)	Exeter	11.30
3	Ole Olsen	(Denmark)	Wolverhampton	11.10
4	Eric Boocock	(England)	Halifax	10.52
5	Dag Lövaas	(Norway)	Reading	10.37
6	Malcolm Simmons	(England)	King's Lynn	10.33
7	John Boulger	(Australia)	Leicester	10.25
8	Chris Pusey	(England)	Belle Vue	10.24
9	Martin Ashby	(England)	Swindon	10.11
10	John Louis	(England)	Ipswich	10.07

== British League Knockout Cup ==
The 1973 Speedway Star British League Knockout Cup was the 35th edition of the Knockout Cup for tier one teams. Belle Vue were the winners after Peter Collins of Belle Vue defeated Anders Michanek of Reading in a race-off because the tie had finished 78–78 on aggregate.

First round

Date	Team one	Score	Team two
28/04	Belle Vue	48–30	Oxford
28/04	Coventry	44–34	Reading
27/04	Hackney	43–35	Swindon
26/04	Oxford	41–37	Belle Vue

Second round

Date	Team one	Score	Team two
25/06	Reading	56–22	Coatbridge
22/06	Coatbridge	41–37	Reading
15/06	Wolverhampton	43–35	Exeter
14/06	Sheffield	29–49	Belle Vue
12/06	Leicester	36–42	Kings Lynn
02/06	Belle Vue	43–35	Sheffield
02/06	Halifax	49–29	Wimbledon
30/05	Poole	40–38	Cradley Heath
26/05	Kings Lynn	42–36	Leicester
18/05	Newport	45–33	Ipswich
17/05	Ipswich	41–37	Newport
17/05	Wimbledon	37–41	Halifax
12/05	Cradley Heath	37–41	Poole
12/05	Swindon	43–35	Hackney
07/05	Exeter	37–41	Wolverhampton
28/07	Swindon	52–25	Hackney
15/06	Hackney	43–35	Swindon

Quarter-finals

Date	Team one	Score	Team two
01/09	Swindon	39–39	Wolverhampton
17/08	Newport	45–33	Reading
17/08	Wolverhampton	43–35	Swindon
13/08	Halifax	41–37	Belle Vue
10/08	Poole	39–39	Kings Lynn
30/07	Reading	55–23	Newport
18/07	Belle Vue	57–21	Halifax
23/06	Kings Lynn	47–31	Poole

Semi-finals

Date	Team one	Score	Team two
26/09	Belle Vue	48–30	Wolverhampton
14/09	Wolverhampton	42–36	Belle Vue
05/09	Kings Lynn	40–38	Reading
03/09	Reading	52–26	Kings Lynn

Final

First leg

1 October 1973

Reading Racers Anders Michanek 11 Dag Lövaas 11 Geoff Curtis 9 Mick Bell 7 Richard May 4 Bobby McNeil 4 Bernie Leigh 2	47–31	Belle Vue Aces Peter Collins 12 Paul Tyrer 7 Eric Broadbelt 6 John Louis (guest) 3 Alan Wilkinson 2 Sören Sjösten 1 Chris Morton 0

Reading Stadium

Second leg

24 October 1973

Belle Vue Aces Peter Collins 10 Jim McMillan (guest) 8 Alan Wilkinson 8 Sören Sjösten 8 Eric Broadbelt 7 Paul Tyrer 6 Chris Morton 0	47–31	Reading Racers Anders Michanek 12 Dag Lövaas 8 Mick Bell 6 Mitch Graham 5 Trevor Geer 0 Bernie Leigh 0 Geoff Curtis R/R

Hyde Road Stadium

Match finished 78–78 on aggregate. Belle Vue won race-off.

== Riders' Championship ==
Ivan Mauger won the British League Riders' Championship for the second time, it was held at Hyde Road on 3 October and was sponsored by Player's No.10.

Pos.	Rider	Heat Scores	Total
1	(New Zealand) Ivan Mauger	3 3 3 3 2	14
2	(England) Ray Wilson	1 3 1 3 3	11
3	(Sweden) Anders Michanek	3 2 EX 3 3	11
4	(Denmark) Ole Olsen	3 3 3 2 EX	11
5	(England) Arnie Haley	2 1 2 3 3	11
6	(England) Martin Ashby	3 3 3 EX 1	10
7	(Scotland) Jim McMillan	2 2 1 2 3	10
8	(England) John Louis	1 1 2 2 2	8
9	(Sweden) Sören Sjösten	1 2 3 1 F	7
10	(England) Trevor Hedge	0 2 2 2 EF	6
11	(Australia) Garry Middleton	2 0 0 1 2	5
12	(England) Barry Thomas	2 1 0 0 2	5
13	(England) Malcolm Simmons	1 0 2 1 1	4
14	(Norway) Reidar Eide	0 1 1 0 1	3
15	(Wales) Kid Brodie	0 0 1 1 1	3
16	(New Zealand) Bill Andrew (res)	0 0 - - -	0
17	(England) Pete Smith	0 EF - 0 0	0

- ef=engine failure, f=fell, x=excluded

== Leading final averages ==
Both Anders Michanek and Ivan Mauger recorded perfect 12 point average scores at home for the season, meaning they were unbeaten by any opposing rider on their own track in League competition.

	Rider	Nat	Team	C.M.A.
1	Anders Michanek	(Sweden)	Reading	11.36
2	Ivan Mauger	(New Zealand)	Exeter	11.29
3	Ole Olsen	(Denmark)	Wolverhampton	10.82
4	Chris Pusey	(England)	Belle Vue	10.55
5	Eric Boocock	(England)	Halifax	10.32
6	Malcolm Simmons	(England)	King's Lynn	10.26
7	John Boulger	(Australia)	Leicester	10.24
8	Martin Ashby	(England)	Swindon	10.18
9	John Louis	(England)	Ipswich	10.06
10	Dag Lövaas	(Norway)	Reading	10.06
11	Terry Betts	(England)	King's Lynn	9.95
12	Reidar Eide	(Norway)	Newport	977
13	Christer Löfqvist	(Sweden)	Poole	9.58
14	Ray Wilson	(England)	Leicester	9.44
15	Bernt Persson	(Sweden)	Cradley United	9.38
16	Bob Valentine	(Australia)	Sheffield	9.30
17	Dave Jessup	(England)	Leicester	9.24
18	Tommy Jansson	(Sweden)	Wimbledon	9.19
19	Howard Cole (a.k.a. Kid Brodie)	(Wales)	Cradley United	9.12
20	Peter Collins	(England)	Belle Vue	9.08

== London Cup ==
Hackney won the London Cup for just the third time but there were now only two teams remaining in London.

Results

Team	Score	Team
Wimbledon	40–37	Hackney
Hackney	45–33	Wimbledon

== Midland Cup ==
Wolverhampton won the Midland Cup. The competition consisted of six teams.

First round

Team one	Team two	Score
Swindon	Oxford	51–27, 38–40
Coventry	Cradley	36–42, 32–46

Semi final round

Team one	Team two	Score
Leicester	Cradley	45–33, 56–22
Wolverhampton	Swindon	43–35

Final first leg

5 October 1973

Wolverhampton Ole Olsen 14 George Hunter 9 Tony Clarke 8 Gary Peterson 5 Tom Leadbitter 3.5 Ken Eyre 3 Jon Erskine r/r	42.5–35.5	Leicester Ray Wilson 11 John Boulger 9 Dave Jessup 7 Malcolm Shakespeare 6 Norman Storer 1.5 Bruce Forrester 1 Malcolm Brown 0

Monmore Green Stadium

Final Second leg

9 October 1973

Leicester John Boulger 11 Ray Wilson 10 Norman Storer 7 Malcolm Brown 5 Malcolm Shakespeare 4 Dave Jessup 2 Bruce Forrester 0	39–39	Wolverhampton Ole Olsen 14 Tony Clarke 8 George Hunter 6 Gary Peterson 6 Ken Eyre 3 Tom Leadbitter 2 Jon Erskine r/r

Leicester Stadium

Wolverhampton won on aggregate 81.5–74.5

== Spring Gold Cup ==
		M	W	D	L	Pts
1	King's Lynn	10	7	1	2	15
2	Ipswich	10	6	1	3	13
3	Wimbledon	10	6	0	4	12
4	Hackney	10	4	1	5	9
5	Poole	10	2	2	6	6
6	Reading	10	2	1	7	5

Home \ Away	HAC	IPS	KL	PP	REA	WIM
Hackney		47–31	33–44	38–38	41–37	45–33
Ipswich	54–23		41–37	47–31	43–35	54–24
King's Lynn	45–33	47–31		50–28	48–30	43–35
Poole	43–35	39–39	37–41		46–32	36–39
Reading	46–32	33–45	39–39	42–36		36–42
Wimbledon	36–42	46–32	40–37	43–35	44–34	

Legend: Blue = home team win; Yellow = draw; Red = away team win.

== Riders and final averages ==
Belle Vue

- (England) Chris Pusey 10.55
- (England) Peter Collins 9.08
- (Sweden) Sören Sjösten 8.73
- (England) Eric Broadbelt 7.00
- (England) Alan Wilkinson 6.94
- (England) Paul Tyrer 6.21
- (England) Chris Morton 5.67
- (England) Ian Hindle 5.16
- (England) Terry Kelly 3.52
- (England) Geoff Pusey 3.05

Coatbridge

- (Scotland) Jimmy McMillan 9.01
- (Scotland) Bobby Beaton 8.00
- (Sweden) Christer Sjösten 6.38
- (New Zealand) Dave Gifford 5.03
- (Scotland) Jimmy Gallacher 4.82
- (New Zealand) Robin Adlington 4.55
- (Norway) Kjell Gimre 4.13
- (Scotland) Alistair Brady 1.79

Coventry

- (England) Nigel Boocock 8.59
- (Australia) Garry Middleton 8.33
- (England) John Harrhy 8.32
- (England) Alan Jay 6.31
- (England) Les Owen 5.55
- (England) Pete Bailey 4.83
- (Sweden) Soren Karlsson 4.65
- (England) Roger Hill 3.44
- (England) Cliff Emms 3.26
- (England) Frank Smith 3.20
- (Germany) Gerhard Uhlenbrock 2.53

Cradley Heath

- (Sweden) Bernt Persson 9.38
- (Wales) Howard Cole (Kid Brodie) 9.12
- (Norway) Ulf Lövaas 6.62
- (New Zealand) Bruce Cribb 5.77
- (England) Colin Gooddy 4.85
- (England) Pete Jarman 4.49
- (England) Dave Perks 4.46
- (England) Malcolm Corradine 4.40
- (Sweden) Lars-Inge Hultberg 3.44
- (England) Dave Harvey 2.50

Exeter

- (New Zealand) Ivan Mauger 11.29
- (England) Tony Lomas 7.57
- (United States) Scott Autrey 6.38
- (England) Kevin Holden 6.00
- (New Zealand) Frank Shuter 5.80
- (England) Chris Julian 5.34
- (England) Mike Sampson 4.74
- (England) Bob Coles 4.48

Hackney

- (Sweden) Bengt Jansson 8.86
- (England) Barry Thomas 7.83
- (Sweden) Tommy Nilsson 6.41
- (England) Dave Kennett 5.55
- (England) Geoff Maloney 5.44
- (England) Hugh Saunders 5.40
- (England) Laurie Etheridge 5.29
- (England) Barney Kennett 4.31

Halifax

- (England) Eric Boocock 10.32
- (Australia) John Titman 6.92
- (Australia) Charlie Monk 6.31
- (New Zealand) Bill Andrew 6.25
- (England) Mike Hiftle 5.63
- (Australia) Les Sharpe 5.14
- (England) Dave Gatenby 4.19
- (England) John Jackson 3.28
- (Norway) Per Hansen 2.33
- (Norway) Jan Terje Gravningen 1.22

Ipswich

- (England) John Louis 10.06
- (England) Tony Davey 7.46
- (Australia) Billy Sanders 7.43
- (England) Mick Hines 6.09
- (Sweden) Olle Nygren 5.87
- (England) Alan Sage 5.68
- (England) Ted Howgego 3.20

King's Lynn

- (England) Malcolm Simmons 10.26
- (England) Terry Betts 9.95
- (England) Ian Turner 6.28
- (Australia) Bob Humphreys 6.07
- (England) Barry Crowson 5.44
- (England) Eddie Reeves 5.35
- (England) Arthur Price 4.82
- (England) Ray Bales 4.71
- (England) David Gagen 4.22

Leicester

- (Australia) John Boulger 10.24
- (England) Ray Wilson 9.44
- (England) Dave Jessup 9.24
- (England) Malcolm Shakespeare 5.80
- (England) Malcolm Brown 4.67
- (England) Norman Storer 4.37
- (England) Bruce Forrester 4.21
- (England) Brian Foote 3.09

Newport

- (Norway) Reidar Eide 9.77
- (England) Graham Plant 7.39
- (England) Roy Trigg 7.37
- (Australia) Neil Street 7.28
- (England) Peter Ingram 6.01
- (Australia) Geoff Mudge 4.79
- (England) Jimm Tebby 3.93
- (England) Alan Cowland 3.62

Oxford

- (Sweden) Hasse Holmqvist 7.77
- (England) Bob Kilby 7.32
- (England) Gordon Kennett 6.42
- (England) John Davis 6.19
- (England) Malcolm Ballard 6.09
- (England) Tony Lomas 5.81
- (England) John Dews 5.72
- (New Zealand) Rick Timmo 5.38
- (England) Roger Johns 4.80
- (England) Eddie Reeves 3.24

Poole

- (Sweden) Christer Löfqvist 9.58
- (England) Pete Smith 8.30
- (Norway) Odd Fossengen 7.18
- (Poland) Antoni Woryna 6.49
- (Scotland) Brian Collins 5.93
- (Sweden) Bosse Wirebrand 5.36
- (Australia) Jim Ryman 4.34
- (England) Norman Strachan 3.70
- (England) Martin Yeates 2.40
- (England) Dave Buttigieg 2.10

Reading

- (Sweden) Anders Michanek 11.36
- (Norway) Dag Lövaas 10.06
- (Australia) Geoff Curtis 8.23
- (England) Richard May 6.05
- (England) Mick Bell 5.83
- (England) Bobby McNeil 5.28
- (England) Bernie Leigh 4.46
- (New Zealand) Jack Millen 3.20

Sheffield

- (Australia) Bob Valentine 9.30
- (England) Arnold Haley 7.78
- (England) Reg Wilson 7.72
- (England) Doug Wyer 7.36
- (Sweden) Bengt Larsson 7.06
- (England) Bob Paulson 6.92
- (England) Rick France 6.85

Swindon

- (England) Martin Ashby 10.18
- (England) Norman Hunter 7.34
- (Norway) Edgar Stangeland 6.81
- (England) Mike Keen 6.67
- (England) Geoff Bouchard 4.90
- (England) Brian Leonard 4.25
- (England) Clive Hitch 4.18
- (England) Mick Handley 3.58
- (England) David Ashby 2.48
- (United States) Sumner McKnight 0.94
- (England) Billy Wall 0.50

Wimbledon

- (Sweden) Tommy Jansson 9.19
- (England) Trevor Hedge 7.74
- (Scotland) Bert Harkins 6.95
- (New Zealand) Graeme Stapleton 6.75
- (Australia) Neil Cameron 5.09
- (England) Tony Clarke 5.09
- (England) Reg Luckhurst 4.72
- (England) Rob Jones 3.06
- (England) Roland Duke 2.09

Wolverhampton

- (Denmark) Ole Olsen 10.82
- (Scotland) George Hunter 7.93
- (England) Jon Erskine 6.73
- (New Zealand) Gary Peterson 5.99
- (England) Tom Leadbitter 5.47
- (England) Colin 'Spike' Burton 4.67
- (England) Dave Baugh 4.63
- (England) Tony Clarke 4.55
- (New Zealand) Dave Gifford 4.33
- (England) Ken Eyre 3.82
- (England) Tony Freegard 2.95

== See also ==
- List of United Kingdom Speedway League Champions
- Knockout Cup (speedway)
