= 1974 British League season =

British speedway season

- League: British League
- No. of competitors: 17
- Champions: Exeter Falcons
- Knockout Cup: Sheffield Tigers
- Individual: Peter Collins
- Spring Gold Cup: Newport
- Midland Cup: Leicester Lions
- London Cup: Wimbledon Dons
- Northern Trophy: Sheffield Tigers
- Highest average: Ole Olsen
- Division/s below: British League (Div 2)

The 1974 British League season was the 40th season of the top tier of motorcycle speedway in the United Kingdom and the tenth season known as the British League.

== Summary ==
The 1973 Champions Reading didn't compete as they no longer had a stadium, following the closure of Reading Stadium and Hull Vikings replaced them. The league was reduced to seventeen teams when the Coatbridge Tigers dropped down to Division Two. Overseas riders that rode in other leagues abroad were banned which meant that top Swedish riders such as Anders Michanek, Bernt Persson, Tommy Jansson and Christer Löfqvist didn't compete.

The Exeter Falcons won their first title. They were headed by the legendary four time world champion Ivan Mauger and backed up well by Scott Autrey (8.32), Tony Lomas (7.29) and Kevin Holden (7.26).

At the end of the season Oxford Rebels finished four points above the Hull Vikings courtesy of a protest over Hull's victory against the Rebels. Hull were later re-awarded the points after a close season hearing and moved above the Rebels.

== Final table ==
| Pos | Team | PL | W | D | L | Pts |
|---|---|---|---|---|---|---|
| 1 | Exeter Falcons | 32 | 25 | 1 | 6 | 51 |
| 2 | Belle Vue Aces | 32 | 23 | 0 | 9 | 46 |
| 3 | Ipswich Witches | 32 | 22 | 1 | 9 | 45 |
| 4 | Sheffield Tigers | 32 | 21 | 0 | 11 | 42 |
| 5 | King's Lynn Stars | 32 | 20 | 1 | 11 | 41 |
| 6 | Newport | 32 | 17 | 3 | 12 | 37 |
| 7 | Halifax Dukes | 32 | 14 | 3 | 15 | 31 |
| 8 | Wimbledon Dons | 32 | 14 | 1 | 17 | 29 |
| 9 | Hackney Hawks | 32 | 13 | 2 | 17 | 28 |
| 10 | Leicester Lions | 32 | 13 | 1 | 18 | 27 |
| 11 | Wolverhampton Wolves | 32 | 13 | 1 | 18 | 27 |
| 12 | Swindon Robins | 32 | 12 | 2 | 18 | 26 |
| 13 | Cradley United | 32 | 12 | 1 | 19 | 25 |
| 14 | Poole Pirates | 32 | 12 | 1 | 19 | 25 |
| 15 | Coventry Bees | 32 | 12 | 0 | 20 | 24 |
| 16 | Hull Vikings | 32 | 10 | 0 | 22 | 20 |
| 17 | Oxford Rebels | 32 | 10 | 0 | 22 | 20 |

M = Matches; W = Wins; D = Draws; L = Losses; Pts = Total Points

== Fixtures and results ==
| Home \ Away | BV | COV | CH | EX | HAC | HAL | HV | IPS | KL | LEI | NEW | OX | PP | SHE | SWI | WIM | WOL |
|---|---|---|---|---|---|---|---|---|---|---|---|---|---|---|---|---|---|
| Belle Vue | | 59–19 | 50–28 | 46–32 | 49–29 | 54–24 | 52–26 | 48–30 | 56–22 | 51–27 | 45–33 | 42–36 | 48–30 | 46–32 | 53–25 | 53–25 | 43–35 |
| Coventry | 45–32 | | 43–35 | 40–38 | 36–42 | 44–34 | 48–30 | 36–42 | 35–43 | 28–50 | 42–36 | 40–35 | 43–35 | 34–43 | 42–36 | 42–36 | 38–40 |
| Cradley | 35–43 | 43–35 | | 37–41 | 29–49 | 44–34 | 42–36 | 35–43 | 38–40 | 38–40 | 39–39 | 38–40 | 49–29 | 41–37 | 44–33 | 49–29 | 47–30 |
| Exeter | 44–34 | 50–28 | 43–35 | | 49–29 | 56–22 | 51–24 | 42–36 | 44–34 | 49–29 | 43–35 | 50–28 | 53–25 | 45–33 | 46–32 | 50–28 | 45–33 |
| Hackney | 37–41 | 43–35 | 42–36 | 38–40 | | 39–39 | 48–30 | 30–47 | 38–40 | 47–28 | 40–38 | 41–37 | 43–35 | 37–41 | 49–29 | 49–29 | 49–29 |
| Halifax | 31–47 | 40–38 | 43–35 | 40–38 | 46–32 | | 42–36 | 42–36 | 47–31 | 42–36 | 39–39 | 42–36 | 50–28 | 35–43 | 49–29 | 52–26 | 54–24 |
| Hull | 60–09 | 58–20 | 37–41 | 34–44 | 44–34 | 49–29 | | 31–46 | 36–42 | 42–36 | 51–27 | 40–38 | 58–20 | 45–33 | 48–30 | 38–40 | 37–41 |
| Ipswich | 54–24 | 41–37 | 53–25 | 36–41 | 48–30 | 48–30 | 44–34 | | 44–33 | 44–34 | 51–27 | 48–30 | 50–28 | 40–38 | 40–38 | 56–22 | 44–34 |
| King's Lynn | 41–37 | 49–29 | 38–40 | 40–38 | 42–36 | 51–27 | 42–36 | 39–39 | | 46–32 | 51–27 | 42–36 | 41–37 | 43–35 | 44–34 | 55–23 | 49–29 |
| Leicester | 40–38 | 47–31 | 48–30 | 39–39 | 42–36 | 35–43 | 51–27 | 37–41 | 43–35 | | 41–37 | 46–32 | 44–34 | 23–55 | 53–25 | 51–27 | 36–42 |
| Newport | 41–37 | 52–26 | 51–27 | 37–41 | 45–33 | 40–38 | 45–33 | 51–27 | 47–31 | 50–28 | | 41–37 | 57–21 | 44–34 | 42–36 | 51–27 | 48–30 |
| Oxford | 32–46 | 48–29 | 36.5–41.5 | 38–40 | 34–44 | 41–37 | 50–28 | 30–48 | 48–30 | 47–31 | 34–44 | | 52–26 | 35–43 | 36–42 | 43–34 | 47–31 |
| Poole | 37–41 | 36–42 | 45–33 | 38–40 | 44–34 | 41–37 | 43–34 | 42–36 | 42–36 | 43–34 | 40–38 | 45–32 | | 45–33 | 43–35 | 43–35 | 38–40 |
| Sheffield | 40–38 | 44–34 | 62–16 | 51–27 | 61–17 | 51–27 | 42–36 | 43–35 | 47–31 | 56–22 | 52–26 | 58–20 | 52–26 | | 55–23 | 57–21 | 53–25 |
| Swindon | 38–40 | 45–33 | 49–29 | 38–40 | 41–37 | 39–39 | 49–29 | 40–38 | 41–37 | 44–34 | 39–39 | 32–46 | 46–32 | 44–34 | | 45–33 | 44–34 |
| Wimbledon | 35–43 | 49–29 | 45–32 | 43–35 | 50–27 | 55–23 | 50–27 | 41–37 | 33–41 | 40–38 | 51–27 | 48–30 | 39–39 | 46–31 | 55–23 | | 51–27 |
| Wolverhampton | 43–35 | 31–46 | 38.5–39.5 | 37–41 | 39–39 | 45–32 | 40–38 | 36–42 | 36–42 | 43–35 | 33–45 | 46–32 | 39–37 | 40–37 | 43–35 | 44–34 | |

Legend: Blue = home team win; Yellow = draw; Red = away team win.

== Top ten riders (league averages) ==
| | Rider | Nat | Team | C.M.A. |
|---|---|---|---|---|
| 1 | Ole Olsen | (Denmark) | Wolverhampton | 11.21 |
| 2 | Ivan Mauger | (New Zealand) | Exeter | 11.15 |
| 3 | Phil Crump | (Australia) | Newport | 10.77 |
| 4 | Peter Collins | (England) | Belle Vue | 10.73 |
| 5 | John Louis | (England) | Ipswich | 10.73 |
| 6 | Terry Betts | (England) | King's Lynn | 10.26 |
| 7 | Dag Lövaas | (Norway) | Hackney | 10.15 |
| 8 | Martin Ashby | (England) | Swindon | 10.10 |
| 9 | John Boulger | (Australia) | Cradley | 9.94 |
| 10 | Eric Boocock | (England) | Halifax | 9.92 |

== British League Knockout Cup ==
The 1974 Speedway Star British League Knockout Cup was the 36th edition of the Knockout Cup for tier one teams. Sheffield were the winners.

First round

| Date | Team one | Score | Team two |
|---|---|---|---|
| 20/04 | Cradley United | 40–38 | Wolverhampton |
| 19/04 | Ipswich | 50–28 | Oxford |
| 12/04 | Wolverhampton | 48–30 | Cradley United |
| 21/03 | Oxford | 40–37 | Ipswich |

Second round

| Date | Team one | Score | Team two |
|---|---|---|---|
| 07/06 | Wolverhampton | 36–42 | Kings Lynn |
| 04/06 | Wimbledon | 38–40 | Ipswich |
| 30/05 | Ipswich | 52–26 | Wimbledon |
| 29/05 | Hull | 38–40 | Sheffield |
| 25/05 | Coventry | 42–36 | Leicester |
| 22/05 | Belle Vue | 53–25 | Halifax |
| 18/05 | Kings Lynn | 45–33 | Wolverhampton |
| 17/05 | Hackney | 40–38 | Poole |
| 15/05 | Poole | 42–36 | Hackney |
| 13/05 | Halifax | 35–43 | Belle Vue |
| 09/05 | Sheffield | 52–26 | Hull |
| 07/05 | Leicester | 43–35 | Coventry |
| 27/04 | Swindon | 40–38 | Newport |
| 26/04 | Newport | 42–36 | Swindon |

Quarter-finals

| Date | Team one | Score | Team two |
|---|---|---|---|
| 31/07 | Poole | 38–40 | Kings Lynn |
| 20/07 | King's Lynn | 38–40 | Poole |
| 16/07 | Leicester | 38–40 | Ipswich |
| 08/07 | Sheffield | 46–32 | Newport |
| 06/07 | Belle Vue | 44–32 | Exeter |
| 05/07 | Newport | 35–43 | Sheffield |
| 20/06 | Ipswich | 42–36 | Leicester |
| 10/06 | Exeter | 46–32 | Belle Vue |
| 24/08 | Kings Lynn | 42–36 | Poole |
| 21/08 | Poole | 45–32 | Kings Lynn |

Semi-finals

| Date | Team one | Score | Team two |
|---|---|---|---|
| 09/09 | Sheffield | 46–32 | Poole |
| 04/09 | Poole | 37–40 | Sheffield |
| 29/08 | Ipswich | 50–28 | Exeter |
| 19/08 | Exeter | 42–36 | Ipswich |

=== Final ===
First leg

6 October 1974

| Ipswich Witches John Louis 11 Billy Sanders 10 Tony Davey 6 Mick Hines 5 Ted Howgego 3 Alan Sage 2 Trevor Jones 0 | 37–41 | Sheffield Tigers Arnie Haley 13 Bob Valentine 11 Doug Wyer 8 Reg Wilson 6 Craig Pendlebury 2 Bob Paulson 1 Carl Glover 0 |

Foxhall Stadium

Second leg

7 October 1974

| Sheffield Tigers Bob Valentine 11 Arnie Haley 8 Doug Wyer 8 Craig Pendlebury 8 Reg Wilson 7 Carl Glover 6 Bob Paulson 1 | 49–29 | Ipswich Witches John Louis 13 Tony Davey 9 Billy Sanders 3 Mick Hines 2 Ted Howgego 1 Mike Lanham 1 Alan Sage 0 |

Owlerton Stadium

Sheffield Tigers were declared Knockout Cup Champions, winning on aggregate 90-65.

== Riders' Championship ==
Peter Collins won the British League Riders' Championship held at Hyde Road on 19 October.

| Pos. | Rider | Heat Scores | Total |
|---|---|---|---|
| 1 | (England) Peter Collins | 3 3 3 3 3 | 15 |
| 2 | (New Zealand) Ivan Mauger | 2 2 3 3 2 | 12 |
| 3 | (Australia) Phil Crump | 1 3 2 3 3 | 12 |
| 4 | (England) John Louis | 3 2 1 2 3 | 11 |
| 5 | (Australia) Bob Valentine | 3 1 2 2 3 | 11 |
| 6 | (England) Dave Jessup | 2 3 1 2 2 | 10 |
| 7 | (England) Martin Ashby | 1 2 2 1 2 | 8 |
| 8 | (Scotland) George Hunter | 2 0 3 2 0 | 7 |
| 9 | (New Zealand) Barry Briggs | 0 2 EF 3 2 | 7 |
| 10 | (Scotland) Jim McMillan | 1 3 0 1 1 | 6 |
| 11 | (Australia) John Boulger | 2 1 2 EF 1 | 6 |
| 12 | (England) Eric Boocock | 0 1 3 0 1 | 5 |
| 13 | (England) Bob Kilby | 3 F R 1 0 | 4 |
| 14 | (Norway) Dag Lövaas | 0 0 1 1 1 | 3 |
| 15 | (England) Terry Betts | 1 0 1 0 0 | 2 |
| 16 | (England) Nigel Boocock | 0 1 0 0 EF | 1 |

- ef=engine failure, f=fell, x=excluded

== Final leading averages ==
| | Rider | Nat | Team | C.M.A. |
|---|---|---|---|---|
| 1 | Ole Olsen | (Denmark) | Wolverhampton | 11.39 |
| 2 | Peter Collins | (England) | Belle Vue | 10.98 |
| 3 | Ivan Mauger | (New Zealand) | Exeter | 10.88 |
| 4 | Phil Crump | (Australia) | Newport | 10.79 |
| 5 | John Louis | (England) | Ipswich | 10.79 |
| 6 | Terry Betts | (England) | King's Lynn | 10.32 |
| 7 | Dag Lövaas | (Norway) | Hackney | 10.17 |
| 8 | Martin Ashby | (England) | Swindon | 10.09 |
| 9 | John Boulger | (Australia) | Cradley | 10.06 |
| 10 | Bob Valentine | (Australia) | Sheffield | 9.92 |
| 11 | Malcolm Simmons | (England) | King's Lynn | 9.78 |
| 13 | Sören Sjösten | (Sweden) | Belle Vue | 9.72 |
| 14 | Jim McMillan | (Scotland) | Hull | 9.71 |
| 15 | Dave Jessup | (England) | Leicester | 9.66 |
| 15 | Eric Boocock | (England) | Halifax | 9.61 |
| 17 | Reidar Eide | (Norway) | Newport | 9.42 |
| 18 | Billy Sanders | (Australia) | Ipswich | 9.34 |
| 19 | Ray Wilson | (England) | Leicester | 9.34 |
| 20 | Barry Briggs | (New Zealand) | Wimbledon | 9.30 |

== Spring Gold Cup ==
East Group

| Team | P | W | D | L | Pts |
|---|---|---|---|---|---|
| Ipswich | 6 | 5 | 0 | 1 | 10 |
| King's Lynn | 6 | 3 | 1 | 2 | 7 |
| Hackney | 6 | 2 | 1 | 3 | 5 |
| Wimbledon | 6 | 1 | 0 | 5 | 2 |

West Group

| Team | PL | W | D | L | Pts |
|---|---|---|---|---|---|
| Newport | 6 | 5 | 0 | 1 | 10 |
| Exeter | 6 | 3 | 0 | 3 | 6 |
| Oxford | 6 | 3 | 0 | 3 | 6 |
| Poole | 6 | 1 | 0 | 5 | 2 |

East Group

| Home \ Away | HAC | IPS | KL | WIM |
|---|---|---|---|---|
| Hackney | | 31–47 | 36–42 | 41–37 |
| Ipswich | 45–33 | | 40–37 | 48–30 |
| King's Lynn | 39–39 | 37–41 | | 50–28 |
| Wimbledon | 38–40 | 40–38 | 36–42 | |

Legend: Blue = home team win; Yellow = draw; Red = away team win.

West Group

| Home \ Away | EX | NEW | OX | PP |
|---|---|---|---|---|
| Exeter | | 36–42 | 48–30 | 51–27 |
| Newport | 55–23 | | 54–24 | 55–22 |
| Oxford | 49–29 | 44–34 | | 41–37 |
| Poole | 36–42 | 35–43 | 43–35 | |

Legend: Blue = home team win; Yellow = draw; Red = away team win.

Final

| Team one | Team two | Scores |
|---|---|---|
| Ipswich | Newport | 44–34, 30–48 |

== Midland Cup ==
Leicester won the Midland Cup. The competition consisted of six teams.

First round

| Team one | Team two | Score |
|---|---|---|
| Oxford | Swindon | 41–37, 34–44 |
| Coventry | Cradley | 39–39, 28–50 |

Semi final round

| Team one | Team two | Score |
|---|---|---|
| Leicester | Swindon | 41–37, 41–37 |
| Cradley | Wolverhampton | 32–46, 38–40 |

Final first leg

8 October 1974

| Leicester Ray Wilson 11 Dave Jessup 9 Frank Auffret 9 Bob Coles (guest) 4 Malcolm Brown 4 Mick Bell 3 Norman Storer 2 | 42–36 | Wolverhampton John Boulger (guest) 14 George Hunter 10 Malcolm Shakespeare 8 Bengt Andersson 3 Colin Meredith 1 Tom Leadbitter 0 Tony Featherstone 0 |

Leicester Stadium

Final second leg

11 October 1974

| Wolverhampton Eric Broadbelt (guest) 12 George Hunter 9 Malcolm Shakespeare 6 Tom Leadbitter 4 Bengt Andersson 2 Colin Meredith 2 Finn Thomsen 0 | 35–43 | Leicester Dave Jessup 10 Ray Wilson 9 Arthur Price (guest) 8 Frank Auffret 6 Norman Storer 5 Mick Bell 5 Malcolm Brown 0 |

Monmore Green Stadium

Leicester won on aggregate 85–71

== London Cup ==
Wimbledon won the London Cup but there were now only two teams remaining in London.

Results

| Team | Score | Team |
|---|---|---|
| Wimbledon | 46–32 | Hackney |
| Hackney | 39–39 | Wimbledon |

== Northern Trophy ==
| | | M | W | D | L | Pts |
|---|---|---|---|---|---|---|
| 1 | Sheffield | 6 | 5 | 0 | 1 | 10 |
| 2 | Belle Vue | 6 | 4 | 0 | 2 | 8 |
| 3 | Halifax | 6 | 2 | 1 | 3 | 5 |
| 4 | Hull | 6 | 0 | 1 | 5 | 1 |

| Home \ Away | BV | HAL | HUL | SHE |
|---|---|---|---|---|
| Belle Vue | | 44–34 | 53–25 | 43–34 |
| Halifax | 41–36 | | 52–25 | 34–44 |
| Hull | 37–41 | 39–39 | | 29–48 |
| Sheffield | 46–32 | 48–30 | 54–24 | |

Legend: Blue = home team win; Yellow = draw; Red = away team win.

== Riders and final averages ==
Belle Vue

- (England) Peter Collins 10.98
- (Sweden) Sören Sjösten 9.72
- (England) Chris Pusey 8.68
- (England) Paul Tyrer 7.47
- (England) Chris Morton 7.24
- (England) Alan Wilkinson 6.49
- (England) Geoff Pusey 4.15
- (England) Terry Kelly 3.24
- (England) Ian Hindle 2.73

Coventry

- (England) Nigel Boocock 8.50
- (England) John Harrhy 6.70
- (England) Alan Jay 5.96
- (Finland) Matti Olin 5.78
- (Sweden) Olle Nygren 4.97
- (England) Roy Carter 4.50
- (England) Frank Smith 4.34
- (New Zealand) Robin Adlington 2.13
- (England) Jeff Shirley 1.75

Cradley Heath

- (Australia) John Boulger 10.06
- (Wales) Howard Cole (Kid Brodie) 7.70
- (New Zealand) Bruce Cribb 6.19
- (Hungary) Sándor Lévai 5.79
- (England) Arthur Price 5.56
- (England) Russell Osborne 4.70
- (England) Malcolm Corradine 4.14
- (England) Dave Perks 4.00
- (England) Dave Younghusband 3.33
- (England) Steve Bastable 2.09

Exeter

- (New Zealand) Ivan Mauger 10.88
- (United States) Scott Autrey 8.32
- (England) Mike Sampson 7.79
- (England) Tony Lomas 7.29
- (England) Kevin Holden 7.26
- (Australia) Steve Reinke 5.57
- (England) Chris Julian 5.52
- (New Zealand) Frank Shuter 4.76
- (England) Peter Thompson 4.23

Hackney

- (Norway) Dag Lövaas 10.17
- (England) Barry Thomas 7.78
- (England) Dave Morton 6.34
- (England) Steve Lomas 5.76
- (England) Hugh Saunders 5.37
- (England) Dave Kennett 5.33
- (England) Laurie Etheridge 5.29
- (England) Geoff Maloney 4.48

Halifax

- (England) Eric Boocock 9.61
- (England) Rick France 7.50
- (Australia) Charlie Monk 7.20
- (England) Graham Plant 7.01
- (Netherlands) Henny Kroeze 5.43
- (England) Dave Gatenby 4.81
- (England) Mike Hiftle 4.75
- (Wales) Graham Drury 2.77
- (England) John Jackson 2.61

Hull

- (Scotland) Jimmy McMillan 9.71
- (Scotland) Bobby Beaton 7.77
- (England) Mitch Graham 5.73
- (England) Tommy Roper 5.52
- (England) Tom Owen 5.14
- (Germany) Josef Angermuller 5.11
- (England) Robbie Gardner 5.09
- (New Zealand) Dave Gifford 4.14

Ipswich

- (England) John Louis 10.79
- (Australia) Billy Sanders 9.34
- (England) Tony Davey 8.29
- (Sweden) Olle Nygren 6.19
- (England) Mick Hines 5.53
- (England) Mike Lanham 5.18
- (England) Ted Howgego 4.80
- (England) Trevor Jones 4.50
- (England) Alan Sage 4.29

King's Lynn

- (England) Terry Betts 10.32
- (England) Malcolm Simmons 9.78
- (England) Ian Turner 6.36
- (England) Barry Crowson 5.81
- (England) Ray Bales 5.25
- (Australia) Bob Humphreys 4.87
- (England) Eddie Reeves 4.77

Leicester

- (England) Dave Jessup 9.66
- (England) Ray Wilson 9.34
- (England) Frank Auffret 6.46
- (England) Mick Bell 5.77
- (England) Norman Storer 5.41
- (New Zealand) Tom Black 3.45
- (England) Keith White 3.29
- (England) Malcolm Brown 2.62

Newport

- (Australia) Phil Crump 10.79
- (Norway) Reidar Eide 9.42
- (Australia) Neil Street 7.70
- (England) Tom Owen 5.26
- (England) Bob Coles 5.08
- (England) Roy Trigg 4.76
- (Australia) Geoff Mudge 4.36
- (England) Jim Tebby 4.15

Oxford

- (England) Bob Kilby 8.32
- (England) Gordon Kennett 7.32
- (Norway) Ulf Lövaas 6.89
- (England) John Davis 6.86
- (England) Richard Greer 6.76
- (England) John Dews 5.18
- (England) Bobby McNeil 4.15
- (England) Trevor Geer 4.00
- (New Zealand) Rick Timmo 3.72
- (Netherlands) Henk Steman 1.60

Poole

- (England) Eric Broadbelt 8.58
- (England) Pete Smith 7.28
- (England) Richard May 6.31
- (England) Colin Gooddy 6.29
- (Poland) Antoni Woryna 5.27
- (England) Mike Cake 2.54
- (England) Martin Yeates 2.29

Sheffield

- (Australia) Bob Valentine 9.92
- (England) Reg Wilson 9.23
- (England) Doug Wyer 9.13
- (England) Bob Paulson 7.24
- (England) Arnold Haley 6.98
- (England) Carl Glover 6.40
- (England) Craig Pendlebury 5.91
- (England) Rod Haynes 4.70

Swindon

- (England) Martin Ashby 10.09
- (Norway) Edgar Stangeland 7.97
- (England) Norman Hunter 6.37
- (England) Bernie Leigh 5.10
- (England) Mike Keen 4.55
- (England) David Ashby 4.51
- (England) Mick Handley 4.06
- (England) Brian Leonard 3.58
- (England) Geoff Bouchard 2.50

Wimbledon

- (New Zealand) Barry Briggs 9.30
- (England) Trevor Hedge 7.09
- (New Zealand) Graeme Stapleton 6.64
- (Scotland) Bert Harkins 5.84
- (England) Roger Johns 5.45
- (Australia) Neil Cameron 5.17
- (England) Reg Luckhurst 5.02
- (England) Rob Jones 3.03

Wolverhampton

- (Denmark) Ole Olsen 11.39
- (Scotland) George Hunter 8.04
- (England) Ken Eyre 6.53
- (England) Tom Leadbitter 5.38
- (Denmark) Finn Thomsen 4.28
- (England) Malcolm Shakespeare 4.04
- (England) Colin Meredith 3.20
- (Sweden) Bengt Andersson 2.59
- (England) Tony Freegard 2.33

== See also ==
- List of United Kingdom Speedway League Champions
- Knockout Cup (speedway)
