= Geoff Curtis =

Australian speedway rider

- Born: 26 April 1943; Sydney, Australia
- Died: 15 December 1973 (aged 30); Sydney, Australia
- Nationality: Australian

Career history
- 1969: Crewe Kings
- 1970: Newcastle Diamonds
- 1971–1973: Reading Racers

Individual honours
- 1971: British Speedway Championship finalist

Team honours
- 1973: British League Champion
- 1972: Spring Gold Cup Winner
- 1972: Metropolitan Gold Cup Winner

Geoffrey Curtis (26 April 1943 – 15 December 1973) was a motorcycle speedway rider from Australia.

== Speedway career ==
Curtis joined Crewe Kings in 1969 before joining Newcastle Diamonds for the 1970 season.

Curtis was a finalist at the British Speedway Championship in 1971 and helped Reading Racers win the British League title in 1973.

Just two months after helping Reading become the British champions, Curtis was killed in a race at the Sydney Showground Speedway.

== See also ==
Rider deaths in motorcycle speedway
