= Crewe Kings =

Defunct British motorcycle speedway team

Club information
- Track address: BR Sports Ground, Earle Street; Crewe
- Country: England
- Founded: 1969
- Closed: 1975
- League: Div 2 / National League

Club facts
- Colours: Red and White
- Track size: 399 metres (436 yd)
- Track record time: 68.0
- Track record date: 12 August 1975
- Track record holder: Dave Morton

Major team honours
| British League Div 2 champions | 1972 |
| British League Div 2 KO Cup winners | 1972 |

The Crewe Kings was a British Speedway team which operated in Crewe, Cheshire from 1969 until its closure in 1975.

== History ==
=== Origins ===
A speedway track operated for a short time in the late 1920s / early 1930s, at the London Midland Region (L.M.R) Sports Ground, as it was known at the time. Previously also used as a cycling, athletics track and cricket pitch.

=== 1960s ===
In 1969, Maurice Littlechild of Allied Presentations formed a team to compete in the British league system. The set up costs exceeded £10,000 and the team were given the nickname the Crewe Kings. The track was a 434-metre-long (475 yd) banked shale surfaced oval and was built on what was previously an athletics ground. Littlechild also promoted the Rayleigh Rockets, the Sunderland Stars and the Reading Racers.

The team joined division two for their inaugural season and finished 7th during the 1969 British League Division Two season. Geoff Curtis starred with a 10.10 average for the year and helped the Kings reach the final of the Div 2 Knockout Cup.

=== 1970s ===
The Kings placed 7th in both the 1970 and 1971 seasons, the latter after signing Australian Phil Crump for his first season in British speedway.

Littlechild died on 12 July 1972 - a year when the Kings achieved the League and Cup double, led by Crump, John Jackson, and Garry Flood. Crump also won the Division Two riders championship and Ken Adams took over the team until the end of the season.

In 1973, Len Silver took over on behalf of Allied Presentations but Crump left and the team failed to emulate the success of 1972. The Earle Street track established itself as the fastest track in the United Kingdom. Originally 470 yards long, it was feared by many riders but was shortened to 436 yards in 1971, both versions had their track records in the Guinness Book of Records for the fastest average speeds.

The club started to run into financial difficulties at the end of 1974 with Dave Parry taking over in 1975 before closing at the end of the 1975 season. Former rider Charles Scarbrough ran the training school for two more years.

The track's site is now the location of the Grand Junction retail park. A memorial plaque to Crewe Kings was unveiled in the nearby Kings Arms pub on 17 September 2010.

== Notable riders ==
- (England) Les Collins
- (Australia) Phil Crump
- (Australia) Geoff Curtis
- (Australia) Garry Flood
- (England) John Jackson
- (England) Dave Morton

== Season summary ==
| Year and league | Position | Notes |
|---|---|---|
| 1969 British League Division Two season | 7th | |
| 1970 British League Division Two season | 7th | |
| 1971 British League Division Two season | 7th | |
| 1972 British League Division Two season | 1st | Champions & Knockout Cup winners |
| 1973 British League Division Two season | 8th | |
| 1974 British League Division Two season | 5th | |
| 1975 New National League season | 16th | |

== See also ==
- Category:Crewe Kings riders
