= John Hack (speedway rider) =

English motorcycle racer (born 1959)

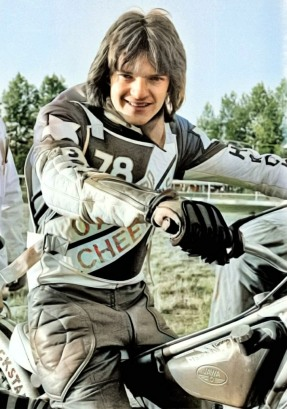
- Born: 29 May 1959 (age 67); Manchester, England

Career history
- 1977-1980: Cradley Heathens
- 1977: Glasgow Tigers
- 1978-1980: Oxford Cheetahs

Team honours
- 1980: British League KO Cup Winner
- 1980: Midland Cup

John Hack (born 29 May 1959) is a former motorcycle speedway rider from England.

== Career ==
Hack was an outstanding Cycle Speedway rider with Blackley, a team in Manchester from 1973 to 1976. His honours included a place in the 1975 British Senior Championship semi-final and a place in the 1976 British Junior Championship final. He was Blackley's top scorer in their 1975 winning British Junior Team Championship.

Taking up Speedway with Stoke Potters in National League in October 1976, Hack was signed for British League side Cradley Heathens in 1977, having made a positive impression while attending their training school. He started with second-half rides on a two-valve bike before buying a Weslake and soon making his National League debut for Glasgow Tigers (speedway) away at Canterbury in September 1977. As the 1977 season ended, he was awarded the Ivor Hughes Trophy as Cradley's most promising junior.

In 1978, Hack transferred to Oxford Cheetahs and quickly achieved a position as a heat leader, taking seven consecutive 5-1s, partnering another newcomer to the team, David Shields. Hack missed some of the 1979 season after breaking his ankle and left Oxford in 1980 after being called up by his parent club Cradley.

Hack retired from racing after a life-threatening accident at Monmore Green Stadium in Wolverhampton put him in a coma for two weeks. Arthur Browning (speedway rider) had lost control of his bike on a greasy track, with his machine colliding with Hack and sending him crashing into a lamppost (a similar incident had seen the death of Gary Peterson (speedway rider) at Monmore in 1975, also during a match against Oxford). The injuries he suffered included a fractured skull, broken ribs and a broken leg and for a time he was not expected to survive. He still suffers certain effects from the accident currently.

== After speedway ==
Hack worked in the family's greengrocery business then at Remploy for 23 years. He no longer has any involvement with speedway. Hack has a daughter, Gemma, and a son, Daniel. In 2010, he attended a reunion of Oxford riders.
