= Phil Vance =

British former motorcycle speedway rider (born 1962)

- Born: 23 November 1962 (age 63); Cardiff, Wales
- Nationality: British

Career history
- 1979: Boston Barracudas
- 1980: Leicester Lions
- 1980: Scunthorpe Stags
- 1980: Exeter Falcons
- 1981: Rye House Rockets
- 1984: Wimbledon Dons

Philip Howard Vance (born 23 November 1962) is a British former motorcycle speedway rider.

== Career ==
Born in Cardiff, Vance was signed by King's Lynn Stars in 1979, riding in their successful Anglia Junior League team but never for their senior team, although he made a few appearances in the National League for Boston Barracudas and Scunthorpe Stags. In 1980, he transferred to Leicester Lions, riding in the junior team and made one appearance for the club in the British League, failing to score. He spent most of the season on loan to Exeter Falcons in the National League.

In 1981, Vance rode in five matches for Rye House Rockets but only score eleven points in total in what proved to be his final season apart from two guest appearances for Wimbledon Dons in 1984 and 1987.
