= Bob Garrad =

British speedway rider

- Born: 18 January 1960 (age 66); Chelmsford, England
- Nationality: British (English)

Career history
- 1976–1986: Rye House Rockets
- 1977–1978, 1981–1983: Hackney Hawks
- 1979: King's Lynn Stars
- 1980: Leicester Lions
- 1984: Poole Pirates

Team honours
- 1979: National League KO Cup Winner
- 1980: National League Champion

Bobby David Garrad (born 18 January 1960 in Chelmsford, Essex) is a former motorcycle speedway rider from England.

== Career ==
Garrad spent most of his career with Rye House Rockets in the National League. He became the club captain of the Rockets.

Garrad was considered to be one of the best prospects in British speedway in his early days at Rye House after finishing third in the British Under 21 Championship in 1978. He also finished third in the National League Riders Championship in 1982.
