= Garry Flood =

Australian speedway rider

Gary Flood
- Born: 1952 (age 73–74)
- Nationality: Australian

Career history
- 1972-1973: Crewe Kings
- 1972: Swindon Robins
- 1972: King's Lynn Stars
- 1972: Wolverhampton Wolves

Team honours
- 1972: British League Div 2 Winner
- 1972: British League Div 2 KO Cup Winner

Gary Flood (born 1952) is a former motocross and motorcycle speedway rider from Australia, who was and eight-time motocross champion of Australia and was capped by Australasia in speedway.

== Motocross career ==
Flood won eight Australian Motocross Championships. (125cc; 1969, 1970, 1973, 250cc; 1969, 1974 500cc; 1969, 1971, 1974)

== Speedway career ==
Flood rode in Britain for just one season in 1972, initially for Leicester Lions, joint top scoring in a match against Peterborough Panthers, but riding most of the season with Crewe Kings, for whom he averaged over eight points from 41 matches, including ten paid maximum scores. He also had rides in the top division with Swindon Robins, King's Lynn Stars, and Wolverhampton Wolves, and represented Australasia in a series against England in 1972. 1972 proved to be his only season in British speedway, with Flood returning to Australia after a couple of challenge matches for Crewe in April 1973. In 1973, he rode in Australia for Victoria.
