= Roger Mills (speedway rider) =

English speedway rider (born 1948)

- Born: 7 December 1948 (age 77); Walsall, West Midlands, England
- Nationality: British (English)

Career history
- 1967: Long Eaton Archers
- 1968: Leicester Lions
- 1969-1970: Middlesbrough Teessiders
- 1971-1973: Long Eaton Rangers
- 1971: Hackney Hawks
- 1972: King's Lynn Stars
- 1973: Newport

Roger John Mills (born 7 December 1948) is a former motorcycle speedway rider from England.

== Career ==
Mills rode in two matches for Sheffield Tigers and Long Eaton Archers in 1967 before joining the newly formed Leicester Lions in 1968. He rode in seventeen British League Division One matches for Leicester that year, averaging 2.58, dropping down to the second division in 1969 with Middlesbrough Teessiders, for whom he averaged over seven points in two seasons there. In 1971, wanting to ride for a team closer to his home, he moved to Long Eaton Rangers, for whom he continued to score highly until his retirement at the end of the 1973 season.

Mills represented Great Britain at junior level and England at Division Two level.
