= Mick Hines =

British motorcycle speedway rider

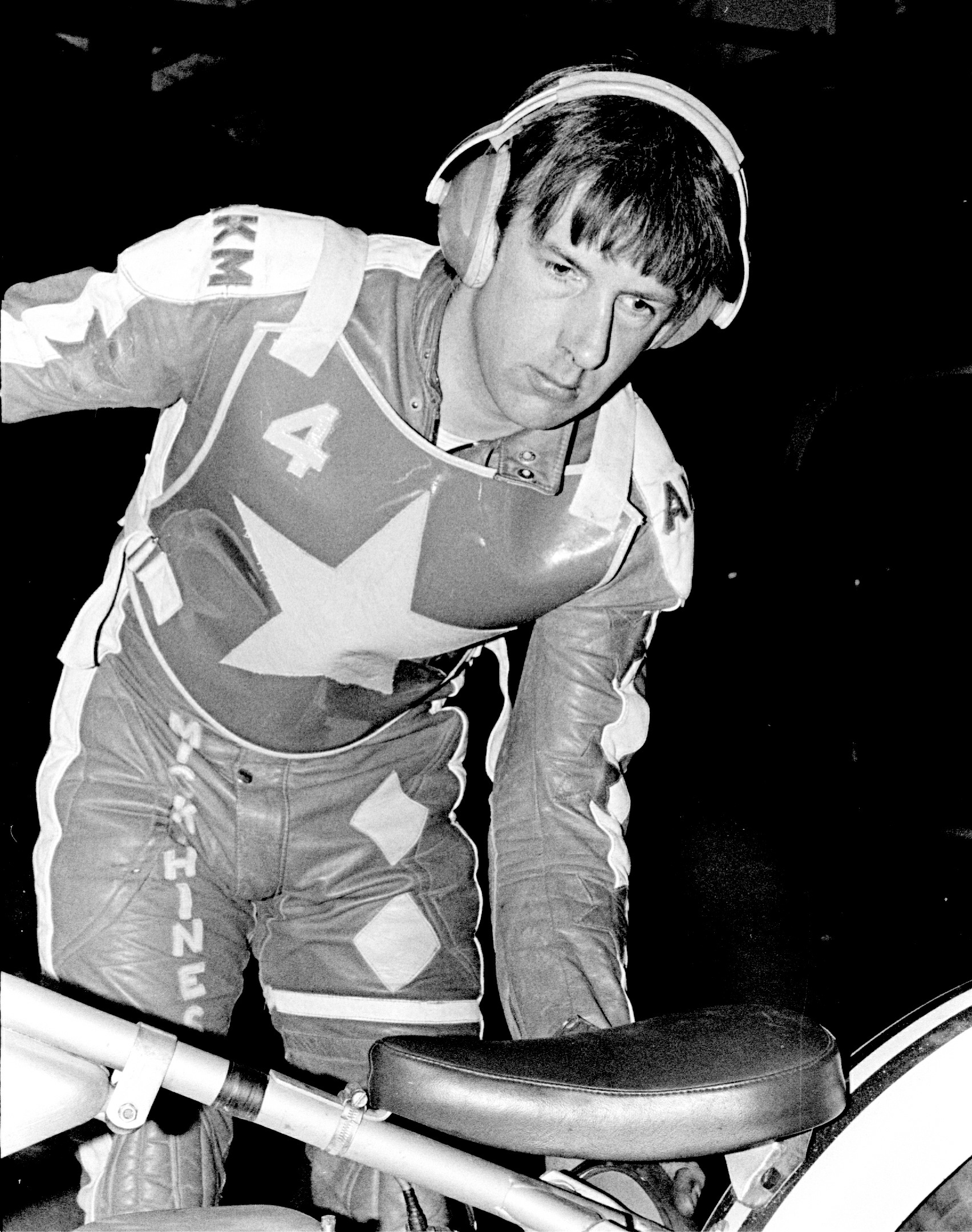
- Born: 7 October 1944 (age 82); Hintlesham, Suffolk, England
- Nationality: British (English)

Career history
- 1972: Birmingham Brummies
- 1972–1975: Ipswich Witches
- 1976–1979: Wimbledon Dons
- 1979: Mildenhall Fen Tigers
- 1980–1984: Peterborough Panthers
- 1980–1982, 1985: Eastbourne Eagles
- 1985: Canterbury Crusaders

Team honours
- 1975: League champion (tier 1)
- 1978, 1980: London Cup
- 1979: League champion (tier 2)
- 1979: Gauntlet Gold Cup

Michael Gordon Hines (born 7 October 1944) is a former motorcycle speedway rider from England.

== Biography ==
Hines, born in Hintlesham, Suffolk, was a forklift maintenance worker before getting into speedway at the late age of 27. He had previously raced on the scrambling tracks of Suffolk. He began his British leagues career riding on loan for Birmingham Brummies during the 1972 British League Division Two season and during his debut season impressed, recording a season average of 7.34. His rookie season was so successful that he rode a couple of times for his parent club Ipswich Witches in the first division.

Hines remained with Ipswich for the next three seasons riding against many of the world's best riders in the British League and helped the team win the 1975 league title and the 1976 double of league and cup.

In 1976, Hines joined Wimbledon Dons and won the London Cup with them in 1978 and 1980. In 1979, he was loaned to Mildenhall Fen Tigers and played a pivotal role in helping the Suffolk club win the 1979 National league title.

Hines joined Eastbourne Eagles from Wimbledon in 1980 but was soon loaned out to Peterborough Panthers, where he spent for the latter part of his career from 1980 to 1984, topping the team's averages in his last season for them.
