= Kevin Holden =

British speedway rider

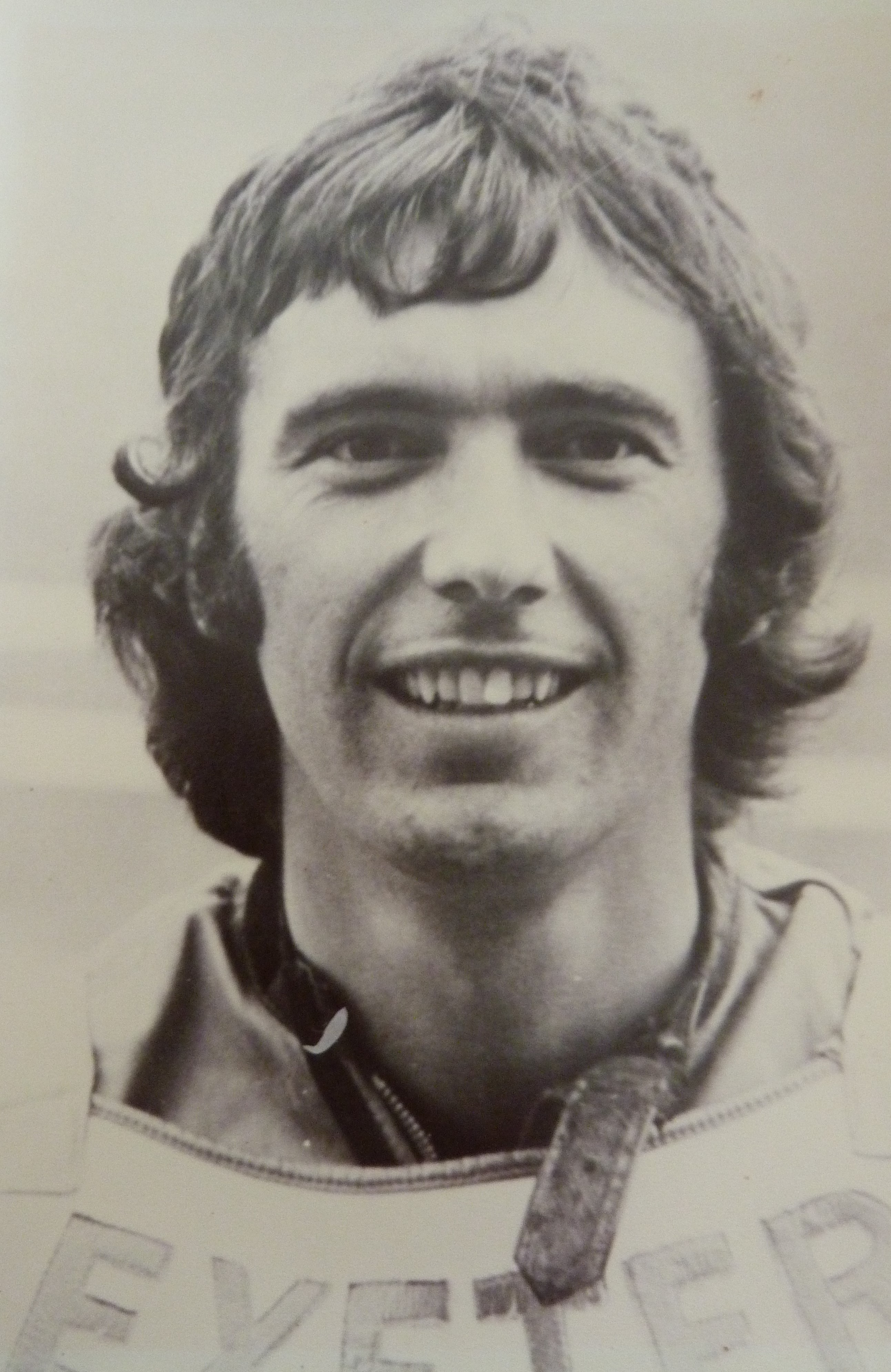
- Born: 30 July 1950; Southampton, England
- Died: 27 April 1977 (aged 26)
- Nationality: British (English)

Career history
- 1970–1971: Romford Bombers
- 1970: Newport Wasps
- 1971–1976: Exeter Falcons
- 1972: West Ham Hammers
- 1977: Poole Pirates

Team honours
- 1974: British League Champion

Kevin George Holden (30 July 1950 – 27 April 1977) was a motorcycle speedway rider from England. He earned five international caps for the England national speedway team and seven caps for the Great Britain team.

== Speedway career ==
Kevin Holden was the nephew of Poole, Southampton and England rider Bill Holden and cousin to Paul Holden, who later rode for Weymouth juniors. Kevin rode in the top tier of British Speedway from 1972 to 1977, riding for various clubs.

Holden signed for Romford Bombers on 26 March 1970. In his first season he achieved an average of 4.65 and won the Best Pairs Gold Trophy with his race-partner Barry Crowson. In his second season with the 'Bombers' Holden emerged as their number one rider securing and end of season average of 8.95 along with winning the Skol Lager Trophy at Rye House and the Spring Cup Classic at Romford, both in April with 15 and 13 points respectively. On 26 June, he made his Young England debut at Ipswich, contributing 8+3 points in a resounding victory over Young Sweden. Again individual honours went his way in June first winning the Carnival Rosebowl at Romford with a 15-point maximum and then, in August, he finished second to Hugh Saunders, with 14 points, in the London Riders Championship. To top off his season, Holden gained more test caps in August, this time against a Young Czechoslovakia, top scoring with 15+1 and 14+1 at Ipswich. On 6 September he made his first division debut with Exeter, scoring three points in a defeat against Swindon. The Romford Bombers finished 12th in the second tier of British Speedway in 1971. He was selected for the Young England team that was to tour South Africa in the winter of 1971, however the tour was cancelled.

With Romford closing, Holden was transferred to West Ham in what was to be their final season. His season started well with a third place in a World Championship Preliminary Round at Peterborough in April and a second victory in the Skol Lager Trophy meeting at Rye House, taking a 15-point maximum. West Ham closed its doors on 23 May after a defeat against Hull. Holden won the last ever race at Custom House, co-held the track record and averaged 8.17 points in his 12 outings with the club. Some of the team transferred to Barrow, however Holden opted to join Exeter Falcons in the first division.

On 5 June, Holden beat Phil Woodcock in a run-off for the final Exeter team place and went on to score 6 points in their 51–27 victory over Ipswich. In September he took his first paid maximum in a victory over Wimbledon. Despite a poor season for the Falcons, Holden's debut year was a great success ending up fourth in the averages with a respectable 6.06.

Starting the 1973 with a new bike, Holden's average dipped to 6.00 in a season where he was an ever-present in the Exeter first team which also included new signings Ivan Mauger and Scott Autrey. Holden was again disappointed that a trip to New Zealand was cancelled.

Holden was an integral part of the Exeter Falcons team that won the league during the 1974 British League season, scoring a season average of 7.26. In April he finished fourth behind Ivan Mauger, Barry Briggs and Phil Herne in a world championship round at Exeter. After an 11-point haul at Wimbledon he reached the semi-final stage of the British Championship where he disappointingly failed to reach the final after scoring 4 points at Sheffield. However, his victory in the Express and Echo Championship at Exeter in May was undoubtedly the highpoint of his career. With a 14-point score Holden took victory over world class opponents Malcolm Simmons (13), John Boulger (13), Phil Crump (11) and Ole Olsen (10). This win secured him an England first team place scoring 1 point (from 1 ride) in his debut against Sweden at King's Lynn, he took a paid maximum (6+3 from 3 rides) against Poland at Exeter and top scored with 15+2 (6 rides), whilst partnering Peter Collins, against the USSR at Wolverhampton. Despite being knocked out of the league cup competition by Ipswich, Exeter went onto win the league title.

A tour to Australia finally came to fruition during the winter of 1974–5. Joining Chris Morton, Nigel Boocock, Reg Wilson, Doug Wyer, Jim MacMillan and Eric Broadbelt, Holden's tour was not a great success scoring 0, 4+2, 0, 0, 7+1, 2+1 and 1 points across the seven test matches against the Aussies. He fared little better in solo events. Although he classed the trip as valuable, the poor performance was, in part, down to being so homesick.

The 1975 season was a mixed-bag and despite securing his place as the third heat leader at Exeter (alongside Mauger and Autrey) with a final average of 7.51 his season was cut-short with a broken leg sustained at Cradley in August.

Holden was anxious to move away from Exeter however the great support that he received from the Falcons fans during his injury saw him return to the County Ground in 1976. Again, a British Final place eluded him however, his great individual successes of the season was qualifying for the Marlboro Southern Riders Final at Reading, finishing sixth in the Westernopolis at Exeter with 8 points and reaching the Daily Mirror Grand Prix final at White City. En route to this major final, Holden finished second to Malcolm Simmons with 12.5 points at Poole and did well in qualifying rounds at Exeter (11), Coventry (8) and Newport (11). Up against the best riders in the world Kevin scored a creditable five points in the final. His club season ended with a 6.45 average, the team finished third in the title race.

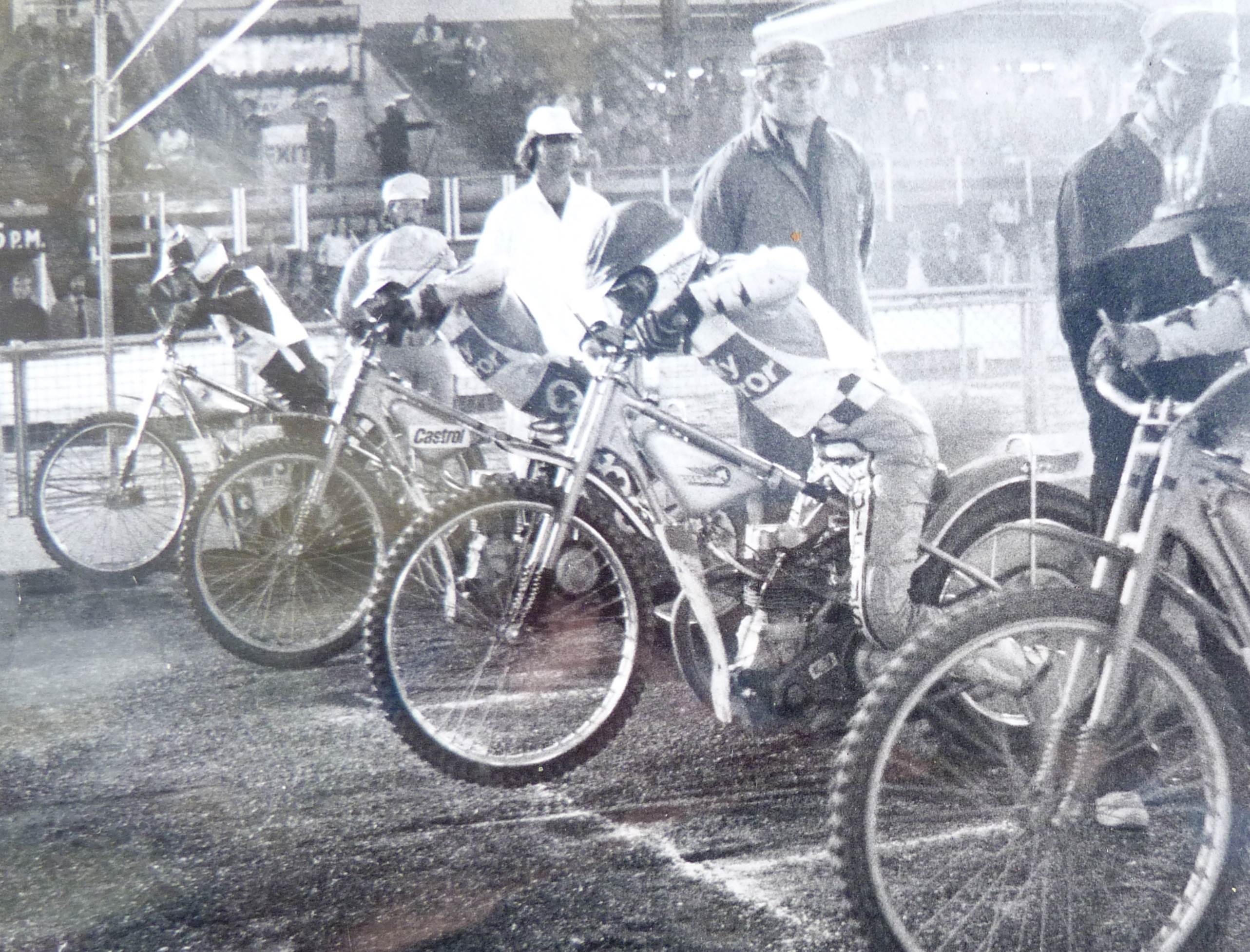
Heat 11, Grand Prix Final, White City. L-R Jim McMillan, Peter Collins, Kevin Holden, Billy Sanders

At the beginning of the 1977 season, Holden moved to Poole Pirates from Exeter, following in the footsteps of his uncle Bill who rode for the Pirates in the 1950s. He started the season in great form taking a maximum 12 points against Wimbledon at Poole in March. He was hitting over a nine-point average but was killed during the home match against Reading on 27 April. After sliding into the fence, he ruptured a blood vessel of the heart.

The tributes in the speedway press read 'The Sport has Lost a Great Bloke and 'Holden Killed as he aimed for the Top'. Ivan Mauger described it as 'a terrible tragedy' while the world champion Peter Collins noted it was 'a sad loss to us all'. Kevin was buried at St John the Baptist church at North Baddesley in Hampshire.

== See also ==
- Rider deaths in motorcycle speedway
