= Frank Auffret =

British former motorcycle speedway rider

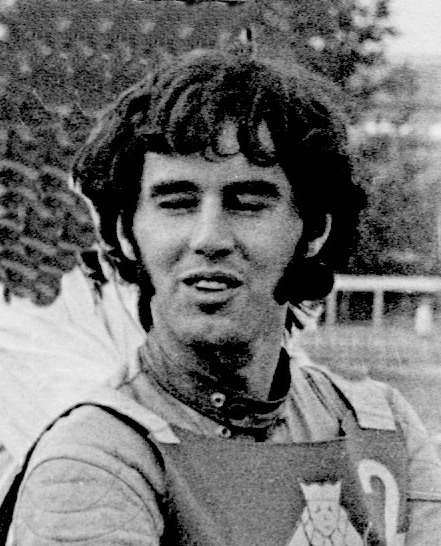
- Auffret, riding for Leicester
- Born: 23 December 1950 (age 75); Middlesbrough, England
- Nationality: British (English)

Career history
- 1970: Hackney Hawks
- 1971-1973, 1982: Teesside Teessiders/Tigers
- 1973: Halifax Dukes
- 1973-1975: Leicester Lions
- 1976-1981: Hull Vikings

Team honours
- 1974: Midland Cup Winner

Frank Joseph Auffret (born 23 December 1950) is a former motorcycle speedway rider from England. Auffret earned six international caps for the England national speedway team.

== Career ==
Born in Middlesbrough, Auffret entered the sport via cycle speedway, and after winning the Tyneside Cycle Speedway Championship in 1967, he took up the motorized form of the sport. He first rode in second half races at Middlesbrough Teessiders in 1969 and made his league debut in 1970 for Hackney Hawks in division one, riding in two heats but failing to score, also riding for Rayleigh Rockets.

Auffret was given a chance in the Teesside first team during May 1971, after promoter Ron Wilson dropped Pete Reading. He established himself in the Teesside team in the second division in 1971, and his average improved to 8.62 in 1973. He was selected for the Young England team in 1972 and 1973. In 1973, he also rode in the top division for Leicester Lions and Halifax Dukes, and signed for Leicester in 1974, averaging almost 6.5 in division one. He stayed with Leicester in 1975 but insisted on being put on the transfer list for the 1976 season. He represented the full England team in 1974 and 1975. In 1976, he moved on to Hull Vikings, riding for them for six seasons until their closure in 1981.

Auffret made three appearances for Middlesbrough Tigers in 1982 before retiring from the sport.

== After speedway ==
After his speedway career, Auffret gained a diploma in Management Studies and Marketing from Teesside University and worked in local government before becoming a website designer.
