= Bruce Forrester (speedway rider) =

- Born: 12 October 1940; Leicester, England
- Died: 9 November 2006 (aged 66)
- Nationality: British (English)

Career history
- 1969-1975: Middlesbrough/Teesside Teessiders/Tigers
- 1970-1974: Leicester Lions
- 1975: Boston Barracudas

Bruce John Forrester (12 October 1940 – 9 November 2006) was a British motorcycle speedway rider.

== Biography ==
Born in Leicester, Forrester initially pursued a career as a footballer, and was on the books of Leeds United F.C. (where he played in the 'A' team alongside Jack Charlton) and Hinckley Athletic F.C. before being forced to retire due to a series of knee injuries. He took up grasstrack and then speedway in 1967 at the training school at King's Lynn and rode in second half races at Leicester Stadium in 1969, leading to a team place with Middlesbrough Teessiders, reaching heat leader status the following year and becoming team captain. In 1970, he made his Division One debut for Leicester Lions and made occasional appearances in the top flight until 1974, riding in eight matches for the Lions in 1973 at an average of 4.21. He represented the 'Young England' Division Two representative team in 1971, later going on to captain the team, and receiving 28 caps in total. Also in 1971, he won the Silver Helmet competition.

In 1975, with his motorcycle shop in Leicester taking up more of his time, and after a dispute with the Teesside management, he switched from Teesside to Boston Barracudas, where he continued to score well, but he retired from speedway at the end of the season.

Forrester competed in three Second Division Riders Championship finals, in 1971, 1973, and 1974, his best result being fourth place in 1973.

Forrester died on 9 November 2006 after suffering from Alzheimer's disease for several years.

Redcar Bears award the Bruce Forrester Memorial Trophy each year in recognition of his contribution to speedway in Middlesbrough.
