= Hugh Saunders (speedway rider) =

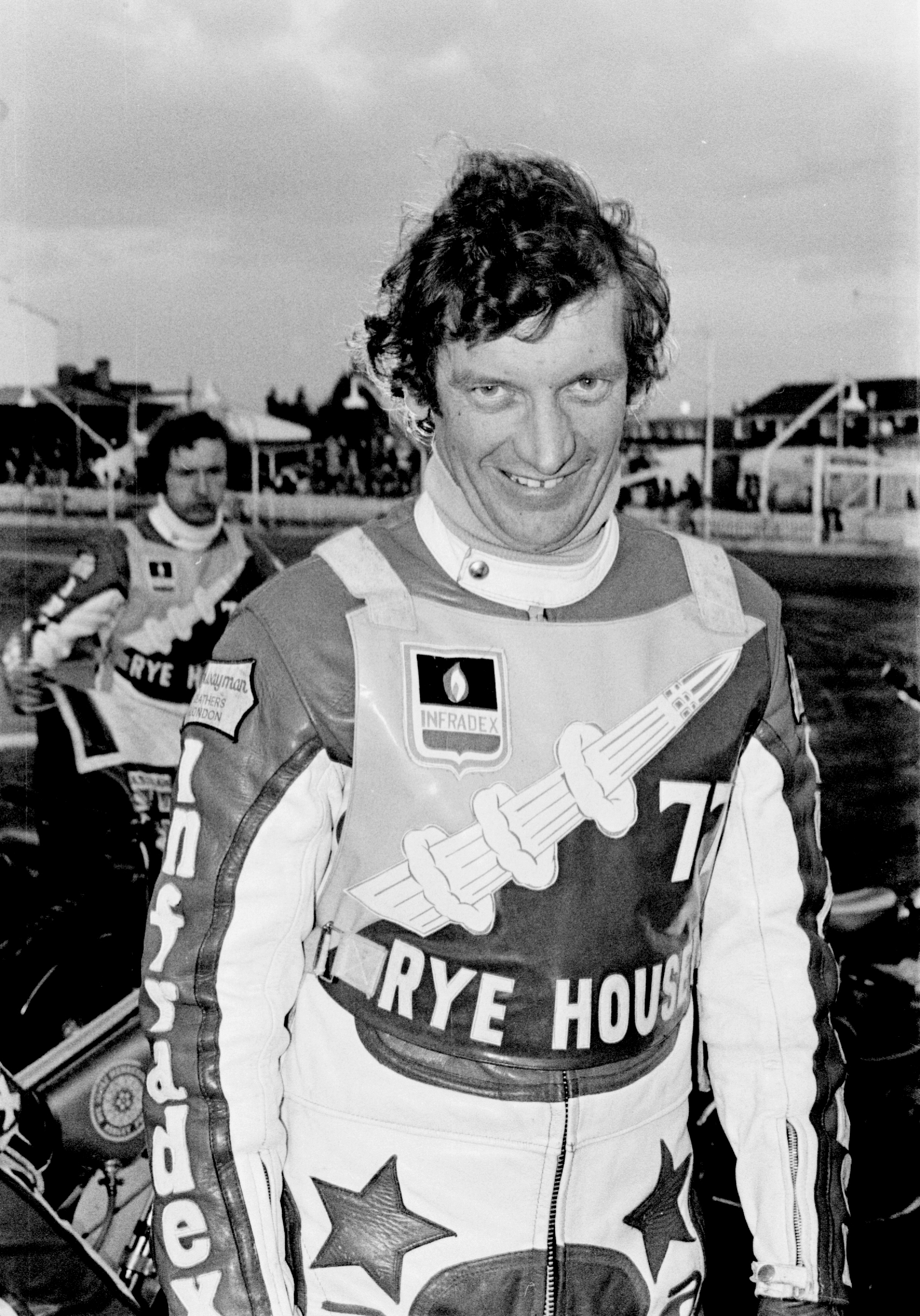
- Born: 25 November 1944 (age 81); Guernsey, Channel Islands
- Nationality: British (Channel Islander)

Career history
- 1969–1970: Eastbourne Eagles
- 1970–1971: Rayleigh Rockets
- 1970–1974: Hackney Hawks
- 1975–1979: Rye House Rockets

Team honours
- 1971: British League KO Cup Winner
- 1979: National League KO Cup Winner
- 1971, 1973: London Cup Winner

Hugh Saunders (born 25 November 1944) is a former speedway rider from Guernsey, who competed in the National League.

== Career ==
Saunders started his speedway career with Eastbourne Eagles where he rode for two seasons. He then moved to Rayleigh Rockets where he rode for the next two seasons, before Rye House Rockets for five seasons as the stadium was sold and team relocated under the promotion of Len Silver. With Len Silver, Saunders rode for other teams run by this promoter, namely Hackney Hawks in the interim between Rayleigh and Rye House.

In his final season in the sport in 1979, Saunders won the National League Knockout Cup with Rye House. On 17 September 1979, racing at Newcastle's Brough Park, he dislocated his ankle and ended his career. A year later he returned for his own testimonial, to ride as reserve in a team of old friends named, for the day, the "Hughgonuts" but broke his leg in his first outing and missed the rest of the event and the post-match celebrations.
