= Tom Leadbitter =

British motorcycle speedway rider

- Born: 8 September 1945; Lichfield, England
- Died: May 1995 (aged 50)
- Nationality: British (English)

Career history
- 1967: Long Eaton Archers
- 1968, 1970-1971: Leicester Lions
- 1968-1970: Middlesbrough Teessiders
- 1969: Newcastle Diamonds
- 1972-1975: Wolverhampton Wolves
- 1975-1976: Teesside Tigers
- 1977: Bristol Bulldogs

Team honours
- 1973: Midland Cup

Thomas William Leadbitter (8 September 1945 – May 1995) was a British scrambles, motorcycle speedway and grasstrack rider. He earned two international caps for the England national speedway team.

== Biography ==
Born in Lichfield, Staffordshire, Leadbitter was a successful grasstrack racer before taking up speedway in 1966 at the training school at Long Eaton. After a single match for Glasgow Tigers in 1966 he rode in four matches for Long Eaton Archers in 1967. In 1968 he was signed by newly formed Leicester Lions, but only made one appearance for the team that season, spending most of it on loan to Middlesbrough Teessiders.

In 1969, Leadbitter progressed with Middlesbrough, averaging close to nine points per match, and had ridden in four matches in the top division as a guest for Newcastle Diamonds. In 1970, he stayed with Middlesbrough as well as riding in several matches for his parent club Leicester, and was recalled to a full team place for the Lions in 1971. He competed in the Second Division Riders Championship in 1970, finishing in fifth place.

At the end of the season, Leadbitter transferred to Wolverhampton Wolves where he spent four seasons, establishing himself as a solid scorer, although in 1975 his rides for Wolves were limited and he returned to Teesside in the National League where he averaged over nine points and recorded five full maximum and three paid maximum scores in 33 matches. After a second season back with Teesside in 1976 he moved on to Bristol Bulldogs in 1977, his final season before retiring. He was a part of the 1973 Wolves Midland Cup winning team.

Leadbitter represented England against the Soviet Union in 1974, and represented Young England against Scotland in 1975.

Leadbitter was also a top scrambles rider, winning the British Scrambles Championship in 1970 and 1972. He also rode in grasstrack events in France and Germany.
