= Malcolm Ballard =

British former motorcycle speedway rider

- Born: 6 August 1948; Catsfield, East Sussex
- Nationality: British (English)

Career history
- 1971-1972: Eastbourne Eagles
- 1971: Cradley Heathens
- 1971: Newport Wasps
- 1971: Hackney Hawks
- 1972-1973: Oxford Rebels
- 1974: Poole Pirates
- 1974: Leicester Lions

Team honours
- 1971: British League Division Two Champion

Malcolm J. Ballard (born 6 August 1948) is a former motorcycle speedway rider from England.

== Career ==
Ballard learned to ride a speedway bike at Eastbourne's winter training school, and signed for Division Two Eastbourne Eagles in 1971. He averaged over 8.7 in his first season, which also saw him get Division One opportunities with Cradley Heathens, Newport Wasps, and Hackney Hawks. In 1972, his average rose to almost 10 points per match, and he doubled up in Division One with Oxford Rebels, averaging over 6.

Ballard was selected for the Young England (Division Two) team that won a series against Sweden in 1972, and injury prevented him travelling with the Great Britain team that toured Australia the following Winter. He moved to Oxford full-time in 1973, and again averaged over 6. In 1974 he rode for Poole Pirates, but departed after a few matches following a row with management, and signed for Leicester Lions after the promoter Ron Wilson made a substantial bid for his services. He struggled to score consistently, partly due to mechanical problems, and retired from the sport before the season ended.

In 2007, Ballard joined Lewis Bridger's pit crew.
