= Malcolm Shakespeare =

British speedway rider

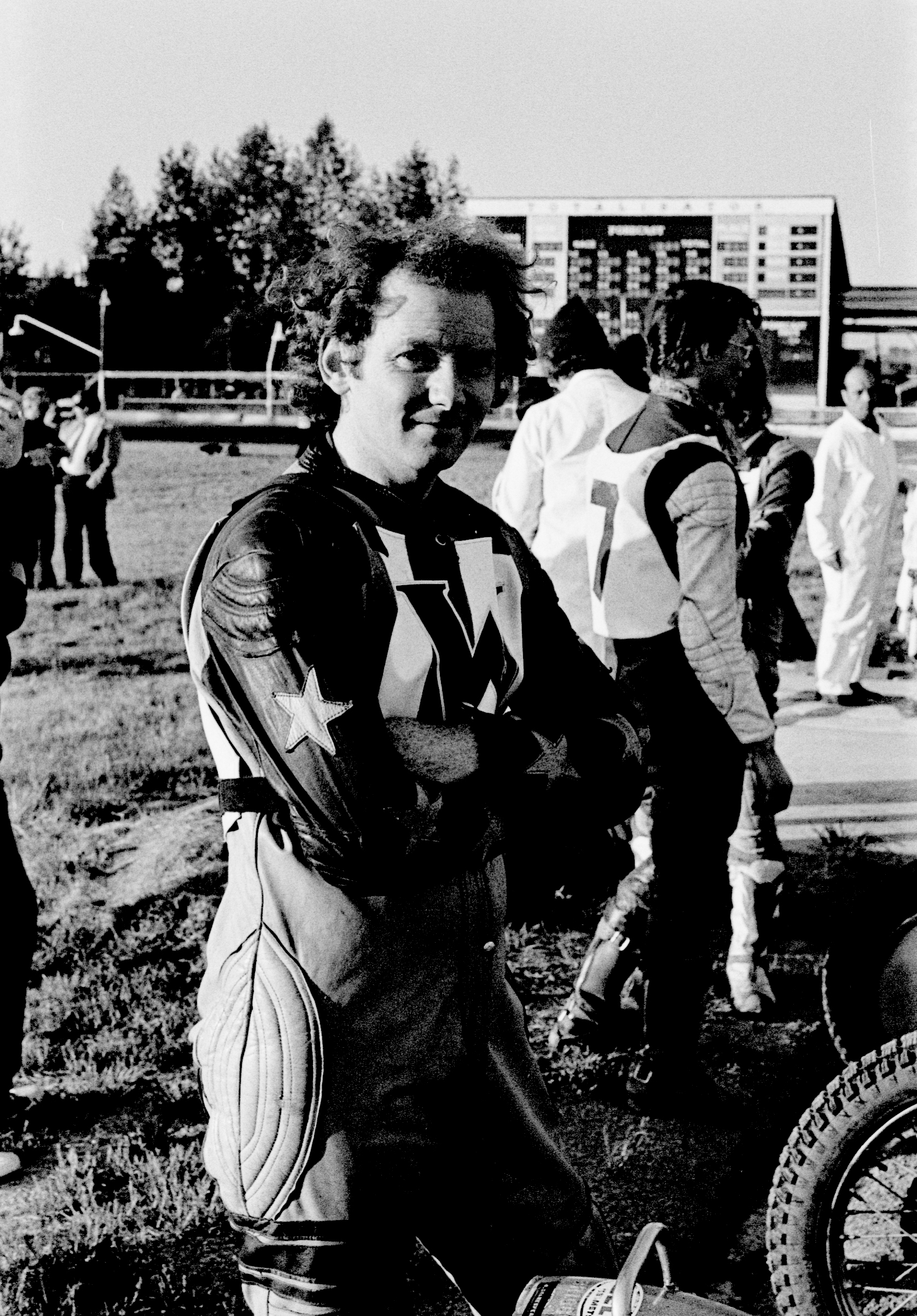
- Born: 25 April 1950 (age 76); West Bromwich, England
- Nationality: British (English)

Career history
- 1969-1971: Long Eaton Rangers
- 1970: Cradley Heathens
- 1971-1973: Leicester Lions
- 1974-1976: Wolverhampton Wolves
- 1976: Stoke Potters
- 1977: Birmingham Brummies
- 1978-1979, 1981: Weymouth Wildcats
- 1978: Hackney Hawks

Individual honours
- 1971: Second Division Riders runner-up

Team honours
- 1972: Midland Cup

Terence Malcolm Shakespeare (born 25 April 1950) is a former motorcycle speedway rider from England.

== Career ==
Born in West Bromwich, Shakespeare had a second half ride at Cradley Heath before making his league debut in 1969 with Long Eaton Rangers in the second division of the British League. After making his Division One debut in 1970 with Cradley Heathens, he had a longer run in the top flight in 1971 with Leicester Lions, averaging close to 4.5 from seven matches. Also in 1971, he finished runner-up in the Second Division Riders Championship. He was selected to represent Young England in 1971 against Czechoslovakia.

In 1972, Shakespeare stepped up to the top division on a full-time basis with Leicester and by the end of the following season his average had risen to almost six points. In 1974 he transferred to Wolverhampton Wolves where he spent three seasons, before moving to Birmingham Brummies in 1977. In 1978 and 1979, he rode for Weymouth Wildcats. After missing the 1980 season, he returned for a final season with Weymouth in 1981.

Shakespeare represented both England (19 caps) and Great Britain (1 cap) at National League level.
