= Ray Bales =

British former motorcycle speedway rider

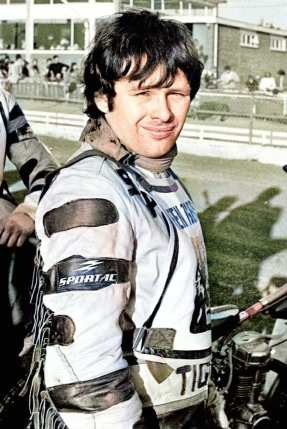
- Ray Bales - speedway rider for Mildenhal Fen Tigers
- Born: 11 June 1951 (age 75); Norwich, England
- Nationality: British (English)

Career history
- 1971–1973: Boston Barracudas
- 1972–1976: King's Lynn Stars
- 1977–1978: Leicester Lions
- 1978–1982, 1984: Mildenhall Fen Tigers

Team honours
- 1973: British League Division Two Champion
- 1973: British League Div Two KO Cup Winner
- 1979: National League Champion
- 1984: Fours Championship winner

Raymond H. Bales (born 11 June 1951) is a former motorcycle speedway rider from England.

== Biography ==
Born in Norwich, Bales is the son of former international rider Billy Bales. He took up speedway after a successful career in cycle speedway, in which he rode for Tottenham Kangaroos and also represented England.

Bales' first speedway experience was at Boston in 1970 and he rode in nine matches for Boston Barracudas in Division Two in 1971. He was a regular member of the Boston team in 1972 and 1973, winning the league and cup double there, and made his Division One debut for King's Lynn Stars in 1972.

Bales rode regularly for King's Lynn in 1973 and made the move full-time in 1974, averaging over five points per match in the top flight between 1974 and 1976. In 1977, he moved on to Leicester Lions, where he struggled despite riding in every match, averaging below 4, and moved down to the National League with Mildenhall Fen Tigers in 1978, scoring well until the end of the 1982 season.

After missing the 1983 season, Bales returned to Mildenhall for a final season in 1984. In 1984, he helped Mildenhall win the Fours Championship during the 1984 National League season

Bales represented Young England against Sweden in 1973.
