= 1978 British League season =

British speedway season

- League: British League
- No. of competitors: 19
- Champions: Coventry Bees
- Knockout Cup: Ipswich Witches
- Individual: Ole Olsen
- Pairs: Cradley Heath & Coventry Bees
- Spring Gold Cup: Exeter Falcons
- Midland Cup: Coventry Bees
- London Cup: Wimbledon Dons
- Northern League: Belle Vue Aces
- Highest average: Malcolm Simmons
- Division/s below: 1978 National League

The 1978 Gulf British League season was the 44th season of the top tier of speedway in the United Kingdom and the 14th season known as the British League.

== Summary ==
The list of nineteen teams that competed in the league was identical to the previous season. The league was sponsored by Gulf Oil for a fourth season.

Coventry Bees won their second title and their first for ten years. Belle Vue Aces were runners-up for the fourth time in five seasons and would receive a double blow when losing in the final of the Knockout Cup. Two time world champion Ole Olsen was in sensational form for Coventry and made the difference throughout the season. Olsen would also seal his third world individual crown by the end of the season. The Coventry side consisted of an array of overseas riders including Olsen and fellow Dane Alf Busk, New Zealander Mitch Shirra, Australian Gary Guglielmi and Jiří Štancl from Czechoslovakia.

== League table ==
Pos	Team	M	W	D	L	Pts
1	Coventry Bees	36	27	0	9	54
2	Belle Vue Aces	36	26	0	10	52
3	Hull Vikings	36	22	2	12	46
4	Wimbledon Dons	36	22	1	13	45
5	Cradley Heathens	36	21	1	14	43
6	Ipswich Witches	36	21	1	14	43
7	Exeter Falcons	36	20	1	15	41
8	Sheffield Tigers	36	19	2	15	40
9	Bristol Bulldogs	36	19	0	17	38
10	Poole Pirates	36	17	3	16	37
11	Leicester Lions	36	17	0	19	34
12	Halifax Dukes	36	14	3	19	31
13	King's Lynn Stars	36	14	2	20	30
14	Reading Racers	36	13	3	20	29
15	White City Rebels	36	12	3	21	27
16	Swindon Robins	36	12	3	21	27
17	Wolverhampton Wolves	36	11	1	24	23
18	Birmingham Brummies	36	11	1	24	23
19	Hackney Hawks	36	10	1	25	21

M = Matches; W = Wins; D = Draws; L = Losses; Pts = Total Points

== Fixtures and results ==
Home \ Away	BV	BIR	BRI	COV	CH	EX	HAC	HAL	HV	IPS	KL	LEI	PP	RR	SHE	SWI	WC	WIM	WOL
Belle Vue		49–29	36–42	42–36	40–38	52–26	51–27	48–30	47–31	38–40	42–36	43–35	47–31	46–32	42–36	47–31	44–34	43–35	52–26
Birmingham	37–41		46–32	41–37	38–40	45–33	37–41	57–21	40–38	30–48	50–28	43–35	39–39	41–37	48–30	47–31	34–43	29–49	41–37
Bristol	52–26	42–36		43–35	46–31	41–37	45–33	47–31	44–34	45–33	40–38	54–24	51–27	55–23	49–29	47–31	41–37	38–41	44–33
Coventry	43–35	48–30	39–38		40–37	45–33	56–22	48–30	48–30	41–37	48–30	45–31	53–25	54–24	45–33	53–25	47–31	46–32	41–37
Cradley Heath	43–35	57–20	50–28	40–37		51–27	45–33	48–30	53–25	41–37	34.5–43.5	50–28	42–36	40–38	50–28	52–26	45.5–32.5	43–35	44–34
Exeter	40–38	52–26	46–32	37–41	47–31		56–22	61–17	56–22	45–33	56–21	52–26	47–31	53–25	53–25	53–25	52–26	49–29	47–31
Hackney	38–40	45–33	44–34	36–42	38–40	39–39		47–31	38–40	35–43	37–41	40–38	40–38	35–43	41–37	51–27	39–36	38–40	43–35
Halifax	41.5–36.5	41–37	44–34	36–42	43–35	41–36	48–29		45–33	39–39	50–28	51–27	49–27	58–20	37–41	50–28	46–32	37–41	54–24
Hull	54–24	57–21	48–30	55–22	46–32	44–33	52–26	41–37		42–36	52–26	48–29	41–37	44–33	49–29	49–29	47–31	50–28	48–30
Ipswich	46–32	48–30	56–22	35–42	44–31	42–36	43–35	51–27	46–32		42–36	50–28	41–37	39–38	51–27	50–28	48–30	43–35	41–37
King's Lynn	36–42	54–24	49–29	42–35	42–36	43–35	49–29	46–32	36–41	55–23		37–41	39–39	39–39	36–42	47–31	52–26	40–38	44–34
Leicester	32–46	43–35	39–38	37–41	37–41	41–36	48–30	48–30	55–23	46–32	42–36		43–35	40–38	51–27	46–32	42–36	43–35	48–30
Poole	35–43	53–25	46–32	38–40	44–34	45–33	49–29	46–32	48–30	42–36	43–34	45–33		41–37	51–27	43–35	53–25	39–39	43–35
Reading	35–43	45–33	44–33	38–40	38–40	40–37	53–24	46–32	39–39	39–37	43–35	43–35	38–40		42–36	39–39	34–43	40–38	43–35
Sheffield	40–37	41–37	42–35	40–38	43–35	50–28	53–25	42–36	44–34	40–38	46.5–31.5	44–34	43–35	44–34		54–24	39–39	46–32	42–36
Swindon	37–41	44–34	41–36	26–52	40–37	35–43	42–36	39–39	34–44	42–36	47–31	48–30	42–36	40–38	39–39		36–42	41–37	41–37
White City	35–43	45–33	41–37	43–34	39–39	36–42	40–38	39–39	36–42	31–47	40–37	29–49	38–40	42–36	51–27	42–29		36–42	46–32
Wimbledon	38–40	61–17	39–38	41–37	44–33	40–37	53–24	47–30	44–33	43–35	42–36	51–27	42–36	56–22	52–26	50–28	47–31		36–42
Wolverhampton	38–40	40–37	38–39	27–51	40–38	38–39	41–37	41–37	39–39	53–25	41–37	40–37	45–33	36–42	44–34	36–42	42–36	28–50	

Legend: Blue = home team win; Yellow = draw; Red = away team win.

== Top ten riders (league averages) ==
	Rider	Nat	Team	C.M.A.
1	Malcolm Simmons	(England)	Poole	10.78
2	Ole Olsen	(Denmark)	Coventry	10.71
3	Scott Autrey	(United States)	Exeter	10.45
4	Peter Collins	(England)	Belle Vue	10.44
5	Michael Lee	(England)	King's Lynn	10.40
6	Chris Morton	(England)	Belle Vue	10.31
7	Dave Jessup	(England)	Reading	10.24
8	Billy Sanders	(Australia)	Ipswich	10.23
9	Phil Crump	(Australia)	Bristol	9.99
10	Ivan Mauger	(New Zealand)	Hull	9.91

== British League Knockout Cup ==
The 1978 Speedway Star British League Knockout Cup was the 40th edition of the Knockout Cup for tier one teams. Ipswich Witches were the winners.

First round

Date	Team one	Score	Team two
29/04	Kings Lynn	40-38	Hull
26/04	Hull	39-39	Kings Lynn
10/04	Exeter	44-34	Coventry
08/04	Coventry	44-34	Exeter
17/04	Birmingham	37-41	Poole
12/04	Poole	48-30	Birmingham
15/06	Coventry	37.5-40.5	Exeter
01/06	Exeter	48-30	Coventry

Second round

Date	Team one	Score	Team two
19/07	Poole	49-29	Swindon
15/07	Swindon	37-41	Poole
09/06	Hackney	51-26	Kings Lynn
03/06	Kings Lynn	31-46	Hackney
06/07	Sheffield	45-33	Exeter
	Exeter	52-26	Sheffield
10/06	Swindon	36-42	Poole
21/06	Poole	36-42	Swindon
03/06	Belle Vue	44-34	Wimbledon
08/06	Wimbledon	41-37	Belle Vue
23/06	Bristol	35-43	Leicester
06/06	Leicester	39-39	Bristol
10/06	Cradley Heath	38-40	Reading
05/06	Reading	37-41	Cradley Heath
13/06	White City	52-26	Halifax
10/06	Halifax	43-34	White City
09/06	Wolverhampton	40-38	Ipswich
08/06	Ipswich	43-34	Wolverhampton

Quarter-finals

Date	Team one	Score	Team two
09/08	White City	23-54	Ipswich
05/08	Belle Vue	44-34	Poole
04/08	Poole	34-43	Belle Vue
29/07	Cradley Heath	48-30	Leicester
27/07	Ipswich	52-26	White City
21/07	Hackney	34-44	Exeter
11/07	Leicester	39-39	Cradley Heath
17/07	Exeter	58-20	Hackney

Semi-finals

Date	Team one	Score	Team two
14/09	Ipswich	44-34	Cradley Heath
13/09	Cradley Heath	40-38	Ipswich
26/08	Belle Vue	57-21	Exeter
25/08	Exeter	51-27	Belle Vue

=== Final ===
First leg

14 October 1978

Belle Vue Aces Peter Collins 15 Chris Morton 14 Les Collins 5 Chris Turner 2 Steve Finch 1 Jim Brett 1 Uno Johansson 1	39 - 39	Ipswich Witches Mike Lanham 9 John Louis 8 Tony Davey 7 Colin Cook 6 Kevin Jolly 5 Billy Sanders 4 Tim Hunt 0

Second leg

19 October 1978

Ipswich Witches Georg Hack 10 Billy Sanders 9 John Louis 9 Tony Davey 9 Mike Lanham 7 Kevin Jolly 6 Colin Cook 4	53 - 25	Belle Vue Aces Peter Collins 10 Chris Morton 8 Les Collins 4 Chris Turner 1 Eric Dugard (guest) 1 Derek Richardson 1 Uno Johansson 0

Ipswich were declared Knockout Cup Champions, winning on aggregate 92-64.

== Riders' Championship ==
Ole Olsen won the British League Riders' Championship for the fourth time (and third in a row), it was held at Hyde Road on 21 October and sponsored by British Leyland Cars.

Pos.	Rider	Heat Scores	Total
1	(Denmark) Ole Olsen	1 3 3 3 3	13
2	(England) Peter Collins	2 2 3 3 2	12+3
3	(England) Steve Bastable	3 2 3 3 1	12+2
4	(New Zealand) Larry Ross	1 3 3 1 3	11
5	(United States) Scott Autrey	2 3 2 2 1	10
6	(England) Malcolm Simmons	3 3 0 1 3	10
7	(Australia) Billy Sanders	2 1 1 2 3	9
8	(Australia) John Titman	3 1 2 3 0	9
9	(England) Ian Cartright	0 2 1 2 2	7
10	(Australia) Phil Crump	0 2 2 1 2	7
11	(England) Doug Wyer	3 0 1 1 2	7
12	(New Zealand) Ivan Mauger	2 1 0 2 EF	5
13	(Australia) Phil Herne	0 0 2 R 1	3
14	(England) Andy Heyes (res)	0 1 F R 0 1 0	2
15	(England) Michael Lee	1 R - - -	1
16	(Denmark) Hans Nielsen	FX 1 0 0 -	1
17	(England) Dave Jessup	R - - - -	0

- ef=engine failure, f=fell, x=excluded r-retired

== Pairs ==
The British League Pairs Championship sponsored by Gauloises, was held at Foxhall Stadium on 12 October and was jointly won by Cradley Heath Heathens and Coventry Bees. The meeting was abandoned after 14 heats due to fog but the result stood.

Pos	Team	Pts	Riders
1	Cradley Heath	18	Steve Bastable 10, Bruce Penhall 8
1	Coventry	18	Ole Olsen 10, Mitch Shirra 8
3	Belle Vue	12	Peter Collins 10, Chris Morton 2
4	Ipswich	11	Billy Sanders 8, Tony Davey 3
5	Exeter	10	Scott Autrey 5, Reidar Eide 5
6	Reading	8	Dave Jessup 5, John Davis 3
7	King's Lynn	7	Terry Betts 4, Michael Lee 3

== Leading final averages ==
	Rider	Nat	Team	C.M.A.
1	Malcolm Simmons	(England)	Poole	10.77
2	Ole Olsen	(Denmark)	Coventry	10.56
3	Peter Collins	(England)	Belle Vue	10.41
4	Scott Autrey	(United States)	Exeter	10.40
5	Michael Lee	(England)	King's Lynn	10.23
6	Dave Jessup	(England)	Reading	10.20
7	Chris Morton	(England)	Belle Vue	10.11
8	Billy Sanders	(Australia)	Ipswich	9.94
9	Phil Crump	(Australia)	Bristol	9.92
10	Ivan Mauger	(New Zealand)	Hull	9.77

== Spring Gold Cup ==
East Group

Team	PL	W	D	L	Pts
King's Lynn	6	4	1	1	9
Ipswich	6	4	1	1	9
Reading	6	2	1	3	5
Hackney	6	0	1	5	1

West Group

Team	PL	W	D	L	Pts
Exeter	6	4	0	2	8
Poole	6	3	1	2	7
Wimbledon	6	3	0	3	6
Bristol	6	1	0	5	2

East Group

Home \ Away	HAC	IPS	KL	REA
Hackney		39–39	38–40	38–40
Ipswich	45–33		39–38	46–32
King's Lynn	45.5–32.5	51–26		46–32
Reading	44–34	30–48	39–39	

Legend: Blue = home team win; Yellow = draw; Red = away team win.

West Group

Home \ Away	BRI	EX	PP	WIM
Bristol		41–37	38–40	43–35
Exeter	44–34		58–20	42–36
Poole	44–34	37–41		41–37
Wimbledon	56–22	57–21	48–30	

Legend: Blue = home team win; Yellow = draw; Red = away team win.

Final

Team one	Team two	Score
King's Lynn	Exeter	43-35, 25-53

== Midland Cup ==
Coventry won the Midland Cup for the third consecutive year. The competition consisted of six teams.

First round

Team one	Team two	Score
Swindon	Leicester	16–26, 27–51
Wolverhampton	Birmimgham	38–40, 47–30

Semi final round

Team one	Team two	Score
Cradley	Leicester	44–34, 26–52
Wolverhampton	Coventry	36–42, 36–42

Final

First leg

3 October 1978

Leicester John Boulger 10 John Titman 9 Ila Teromaa 9 John McNeill 5 Jerzy Rembas 2 Tom Godal 2 Chris Sully 0	37–41	Coventry Mitch Shirra 10 Ole Olsen 9 Mick Bell 6 Gary Guglielmi 6 Alf Buck 4 Martin Yeates (guest) 4 Alan Molyneux 2

Leicester Stadium

Second leg

14 October 1978

Coventry Ole Olsen 12 Mitch Shirra 12 Jiri Stancl 9 Alan Molyneux 8 Alf Buck 5 Mick Bell 5 Stuart Cope 1	52–26	Leicester John Titman 7 Jerzy Rembas 7 John Boulger 5 John McNeill 4 Tom Godal 2 Chris Sully 1 Ila Teromaa r/r

Brandon Stadium

Coventry won on aggregate 93–63

== Northern Trophy ==
		M	W	D	L	Pts
1	Belle Vue	6	5	0	1	10
2	Halifax	6	4	0	2	8
3	Sheffield	6	2	0	4	4
4	Hull	6	1	0	5	2

Home \ Away	BV	HAL	HUL	SHE
Belle Vue		44–34	40–38	43–35
Halifax	40–38		45–33	46–32
Hull	36–42	36–42		42–36
Sheffield	38–40	43–34	46–32	

Legend: Blue = home team win; Yellow = draw; Red = away team win.

== London Cup ==
Wimbledon won the London Cup but White City did not compete and therefore the competition consisted of just two teams.

Results

Team	Score	Team
Hackney	39–38	Wimbledon
Wimbledon	55–23	Hackney

== Riders and final averages ==
Belle Vue

- (England) Peter Collins 10.41
- (England) Chris Morton 10.11
- (England) Les Collins 8.00
- (England) Alan Wilkinson 7.73
- (England) Steve Finch 4.90
- (England) Jim Brett 4.52
- (England) Chris Turner 4.45
- (Australia) Rob Maxfield 4.36
- (England) Derek Richardson 4.30
- (England) Keith Bloxsome 1.14

Birmingham

- (Australia) Phil Herne 8.56
- (England) Ray Wilson 8.30
- (England) Ted Howgego 6.80
- (England) Richard Greer 6.66
- (Finland) Ari Koponen 5.05
- (Sweden) Bengt Jansson 4.94
- (England) Alan Emerson 4.31
- (Denmark) Finn Jensen 4.17

Bristol

- (Australia) Phil Crump 9.92
- (United States) Steve Gresham 9.15
- (Norway) Tormod Langli 7.29
- (England) Nigel Boocock 5.90
- (New Zealand) Bruce Cribb 5.32
- (Netherlands) Henny Kroeze 5.12
- (Netherlands) Henk Steman 4.69
- (Sweden) Sören Sjösten 4.49
- (Australia) Tony Garard 3.65
- (England) Paul Tyrer 3.48

Coventry

- (Denmark) Ole Olsen 10.56
- (New Zealand) Mitch Shirra 9.49
- (England) Alan Molyneux 7.85
- (Denmark) Alf Busk 6.23
- (Czech Republic) Jiří Štancl 6.07
- (Australia) Gary Guglielmi 5.60
- (England) Mick Bell 4.94
- (England) Frank Smith 4.24
- (England) Dave Mortiboys 2.86

Cradley Heath

- (England) Steve Bastable 9.51
- (United States) Bruce Penhall 9.26
- (England) Alan Grahame 8.21
- (Denmark) Kristian Praestbro 6.56
- (New Zealand) Bruce Cribb 6.22
- (England) Phil Collins 5.44
- (England) Dave Perks 5.23
- (Finland) Pekka Hautamaki 5.22
- (Australia) Dave Shields 5.05
- (England) Arthur Price 3.68

Exeter

- (United States) Scott Autrey 10.40
- (Norway) Reidar Eide 8.44
- (Czech Republic) Václav Verner 8.35
- (Zimbabwe) Peter Prinsloo 7.01
- (Australia) Mike Farrell 6.75
- (Australia) Steve Koppe 6.09
- (England) Les Rumsey 6.06
- (Czech Republic) Jan Verner 5.86

Hackney

- (Denmark) Finn Thomsen 7.70
- (England) Keith White 6.70
- (England) Barry Thomas 6.54
- (England) Vic Harding 6.28
- (Denmark) Bo Petersen 6.14
- (England) Bobby McNeil 5.27
- (England) Ted Hubbard 5.24
- (England) Malcolm Shakespeare 4.00
- (Denmark) Bent Rasmussen 3.65
- (England) Billy Spiers 1.60

Halifax

- (England) Ian Cartwright 8.35
- (Denmark) Mike Lohmann 8.06
- (England) Mitch Graham 7.45
- (Australia) Mick McKeon 6.19
- (England) Eric Broadbelt 5.98
- (England) Chris Pusey 5.83
- (England) Kenny Carter 5.40
- (Denmark) Klaus Lohmann 4.81

Hull

- (New Zealand) Ivan Mauger 9.77
- (England) Joe Owen 9.06
- (Scotland) Bobby Beaton 7.26
- (United States) Kelly Moran 7.01
- (England) Tom Owen 6.74
- (Wales) Graham Drury 6.63
- (England) Frank Auffret 6.49
- (England) Phil Kynman 5.04
- (Australia) Rod Hunter 2.33

Ipswich

- (Australia) Billy Sanders 9.94
- (England) Tony Davey 9.60
- (England) John Louis 9.03
- (England) Kevin Jolly 6.82
- (England) Colin Cook 4.79
- (England) Ted Howgego 4.40
- (England) Mike Lanham 3.94
- (England) Tim Hunt 3.09

King's Lynn

- (England) Michael Lee 10.23
- (England) Terry Betts 8.10
- (England) Ian Turner 7.01
- (Sweden) Richard Hellsen 5.93
- (England) David Gagen 5.79
- (England) Carl Glover 4.44
- (England) Pete Smith 4.35
- (England) Billy Spiers 3.57
- (Netherlands) Frits Koppe 3.37
- (Denmark) Bent Rasmussen 3.30
- (England) Derek Harrison 2.09

Leicester

- (Australia) John Titman 8.94
- (Finland) Ila Teromaa 8.70
- (Australia) John Boulger 8.41
- (Norway) Tom Godal 4.94
- (Poland) Jerzy Rembas 4.84
- (Australia) John McNeill 4.47
- (England) Colin Meredith 4.33
- (England) Neil Leeks 3.06
- (England) Chris Sully 2.12
- (Sweden) Lars Ericsson 2.00

Poole

- (England) Malcolm Simmons 10.77
- (England) Neil Middleditch 7.67
- (Sweden) Christer Sjösten 7.25
- (United States) Mike Curoso 6.46
- (Australia) Danny Kennedy 6.03
- (England) Martin Yeates 6.00
- (England) Kelvin Mullarkey 5.62
- (Poland) Andrzej Tkocz 4.51
- (England) Colin Gooddy 3.36

Reading

- (England) Dave Jessup 10.20
- (England) John Davis 8.93
- (Germany) Hans Wassermann 5.91
- (England) Bernie Leigh 5.90
- (England) Melvyn Taylor 4.53
- (New Zealand) Roger Abel 4.00
- (Australia) Bob Humphreys 3.69
- (Poland) Henryk Glücklich 2.94
- (England) Kevin Bowen 2.56

Sheffield

- (England) Doug Wyer 9.35
- (England) Reg Wilson 8.59
- (Sweden) Bernt Persson 6.93
- (England) Nicky Allott 6.65
- (England) Craig Pendlebury 6.45
- (Sweden) Bosse Wirebrand 3.35
- (Australia) Tony Boyle 3.20
- (England) Billy Burton 2.94
- (England) Phil White 2.53

Swindon

- (England) Bob Kilby 8.44
- (Sweden) Jan Andersson 8.05
- (England) Martin Ashby 7.68
- (England) Geoff Bouchard 6.55
- (England) David Ashby 4.39
- (Norway) Rolf Gramstad 4.00
- (England) Robert Henry 3.17
- (Poland) Jerzy Trzeszkowski 2.42
- (England) Malcolm Holloway 2.29
- (Denmark) Steen Mastrup 1.88
- (England) Richard Evans 1.60
- (Poland) Leonard Raba 0.00

White City

- (England) Gordon Kennett 9.52
- (Finland) Kai Niemi 7.17
- (England) Steve Weatherley 6.67
- (England) Dave Kennett 5.48
- (Poland) Marek Cieślak 5.16
- (Poland) Andrzej Jurczynski 5.05
- (England) Trevor Geer 4.95
- (England) Paul Gachet 4.66

Wimbledon

- (New Zealand) Larry Ross 9.29
- (Poland) Edward Jancarz 8.61
- (England) Roger Johns 7.82
- (England) Mick Hines 7.26
- (Sweden) Stefan Salomonsson 6.67
- (Netherlands) Rudy Muts 6.53
- (England) Colin Richardson 6.46
- (New Zealand) Graeme Stapleton 3.56

Wolverhampton

- (Denmark) Hans Nielsen 8.85
- (Scotland) Jimmy McMillan 8.58
- (England) Dave Morton 8.58
- (Norway) Edgar Stangeland 4.37
- (Wales) Brian Woodward 3.87
- (Sweden) Hasse Danielsson 3.70
- (Denmark) Knud Ellegaard 3.62
- (England) Steve Lomas 2.56

== See also ==
- List of United Kingdom Speedway League Champions
- Knockout Cup (speedway)
