= 1977 British League season =

British speedway season

- League: British League
- No. of competitors: 19
- Champions: White City Rebels
- Knockout Cup: King's Lynn Stars
- Individual: Ole Olsen
- Pairs: Ipswich Witches
- Spring Gold Cup: Reading Racers
- Midland Cup: Coventry Bees
- London Cup: White City Rebels
- Northern Trophy: Belle Vue Aces
- Highest average: Michael Lee
- Division/s below: 1977 National League

The 1977 Gulf British League season was the 43rd season of the top tier of motorcycle speedway in the United Kingdom and the 13th season known as the British League.

== Summary ==
Newport had dropped down to the National League but their riders transferred to the Bristol Bulldogs so the league retained 19 teams. Cradley Heath reverted to their nickname of Heathens after four years of being called United. The league was sponsored by Gulf Oil for a third season.

White City Rebels won the title in only their second season of existence. The London team caused a surprise with their consistent form throughout the season with heavy scoring of Gordon Kennett leading the team. The success came from a group of five other riders hitting around a seven average to support Kennett. The five were Englishmen Mike Sampson, Steve Weatherley and Trevor Geer, Pole Marek Cieślak and Finn Kai Niemi. Wolverhampton Wolves signed 18 year-old Danish rider Hans Nielsen.

Kevin Holden of Poole Pirates had started the season in great form for his new club, following his move from Exeter Falcons. He was hitting over a 9-point average but sadly was killed during the home match against Reading on 27 April. After sliding into the fence he ruptured a blood vessel of the heart.

== Final table ==
Pos	Team	PL	W	D	L	Pts
1	White City Rebels	36	27	1	8	55
2	Exeter Falcons	36	25	3	8	53
3	Reading Racers	36	25	3	8	53
4	Ipswich Witches	36	25	1	10	51
5	Belle Vue Aces	36	19	3	14	41
6	King's Lynn Stars	36	19	2	15	40
7	Cradley Heathens	36	20	0	16	40
8	Coventry Bees	36	19	1	16	39
9	Wimbledon Dons	36	17	2	17	36
10	Poole Pirates	36	17	2	17	36
11	Swindon Robins	36	17	1	18	35
12	Bristol Bulldogs	36	17	0	19	34
13	Sheffield Tigers	36	16	2	18	34
14	Hull Vikings	36	15	0	21	30
15	Wolverhampton Wolves	36	14	0	22	28
16	Hackney Hawks	36	13	1	22	27
17	Halifax Dukes	36	12	0	24	24
18	Birmingham Brummies	36	8	0	28	16
19	Leicester Lions	36	6	0	30	12

M = Matches; W = Wins; D = Draws; L = Losses; Pts = Total Points

== Fixtures and results ==
Home \ Away	BV	BIR	BRI	COV	CH	EX	HAC	HAL	HV	IPS	KL	LEI	PP	RR	SHE	SWI	WC	WIM	WOL
Belle Vue		44–34	41–37	47–31	54–23	25–53	51–27	51–27	38–39	26–52	45–33	56.5–21.5	47–31	39–39	46–32	46–32	37–41	39–39	50–28
Birmingham	33–45		43–35	41–37	38–40	35–42	40–38	43–32	38–40	31–47	36–42	44–34	35–43	37–41	40–38	41–37	34–44	41–37	25–53
Bristol	40–38	47–31		59–19	48–30	35–42	48–30	43–35	47–31	44–34	43–34	58–20	45–33	57–21	43–35	42–36	40–38	36–41	42–36
Coventry	39–39	46–31	48–30		42–36	42–36	57–21	44–34	58–20	45–32	45–33	57–20	47–30	45–32	54–24	43–35	31–47	48–29	46–32
Cradley Heath	36–42	49–29	51–26	40–38		43–35	55–23	52–25	44–33	37–41	41–33	48–29	50–27	41–37	50–28	36–42	33.5–44.5	48–30	38–40
Exeter	32–46	58–20	54–23	52–26	57–21		52–26	48–30	53–25	53–25	47–31	52–26	56–21	59–19	42–36	56–22	46–32	42–36	54–24
Hackney	42–36	44–34	43–35	35–39	25–53	41–37		39–32	42–36	48–30	33–45	47–31	42–36	33–45	46–32	50–28	37.5–40.5	45–33	41–37
Halifax	32–46	52–26	45–33	48–30	36–42	34–44	54–24		48–30	44–34	40–38	49–29	48–30	36–42	46–32	49–28	38–40	41–36	37–41
Hull	36–42	51–27	42–36	44–33	44–34	36–42	48–30	48–30		44–34	38–40	41–37	47–31	31–47	52–26	41–37	38–40	43–35	52–26
Ipswich	41–37	49–28	44–34	46–32	43–35	41–37	47–30	44–34	44–34		45–33	54–24	58–20	49–29	46–32	47–31	41–37	44–34	55–23
King's Lynn	42–35	43–35	45–33	43–34	37–41	38–40	49–28	52–26	52–26	38–40		44–33	47–31	42–36	48–30	47–31	39–39	41–37	42–36
Leicester	36–42	44–34	35–42	27–51	38–40	33–45	42–36	45–33	43–35	36–42	36–42		38–40	37–41	36–42	41–37	37–40	40–37	34–44
Poole	41–36	44–33	55–23	48–30	36–42	50–28	50–27	53–25	48–30	33–41	39–39	54–24		42–36	48–30	42–36	35–43	44–34	40–38
Reading	42–36	52–26	49–29	40–38	40–38	39–39	47–31	57–21	42–36	42–36	43–35	49–29	39–39		49–29	44–34	43–35	47–31	43–35
Sheffield	49–29	46–32	49–29	43–35	42–36	39–39	39–39	43–35	44.5–33.5	49–29	43–35	42–35	46–32	37–40		54–23	51–27	44–34	45–33
Swindon	50–28	47–31	51–27	44.5–33.5	41–37	39–39	51–27	62–15	46–32	41–37	40–38	43–35	47–31	32–46	52–26		46–32	50–27	50–28
White City	43–35	49–29	49–26	40–37	51–27	47–31	61–17	53–24	54–24	42–36	37–41	50–28	46–32	36–41	46–32	52–26		42–36	42–36
Wimbledon	40–38	48–30	43–35	47–31	48–30	41–36	47–31	50–27	47–31	39–39	44–34	43–35	47–31	42–36	43–35	39–38	38–40		43–35
Wolverhampton	37–41	43–35	47–31	35–43	35–40	31–47	40–38	52–26	39–38	37–41	44–33	39–38	36–42	31–47	48–30	40–38	35–43	40–38	

Legend: Blue = home team win; Yellow = draw; Red = away team win.

== Top ten riders (league averages) ==
	Rider	Nat	Team	C.M.A.
1	Michael Lee	(England)	King's Lynn	10.64
2	Ivan Mauger	(New Zealand)	Exeter	10.62
3	Peter Collins	(England)	Belle Vue	10.49
4	Gordon Kennett	(England)	White City	10.41
5	Ole Olsen	(Denmark)	Coventry	10.40
6	Billy Sanders	(Australia)	Ipswich	10.39
7	Anders Michanek	(Sweden)	Cradley	10.35
8	Dave Jessup	(England)	Reading	10.27
9	Malcolm Simmons	(England)	Poole	10.22
10	John Davis	(England)	Reading	9.84

== British League Knockout Cup ==
The 1977 Speedway Star British League Knockout Cup was the 39th edition of the Knockout Cup for tier one teams. King's Lynn Stars were the winners.

First round

Date	Team one	Score	Team two
18/05	Poole	41-37	Reading
25/04	Exeter	50-28	Swindon
25/04	Reading	43-35	Poole
15/04	Wolverhampton	51-27	Leicester
12/04	Leicester	40-38	Wolverhampton

Second round

Date	Team one	Score	Team two
23/07	Halifax	38-40	Reading
22/07	Wolverhampton	41-37	Kings Lynn
28/06	White City	51-27	Birmingham
20/06	Birmingham	34-44	White City
18/06	Coventry	57-21	Exeter
18/06	Kings Lynn	55-23	Wolverhampton
17/06	Bristol	56-22	Wimbledon
16/06	Wimbledon	48-30	Bristol
13/06	Exeter	38-40	Coventry
09/06	Sheffield	46-32	Hackney
08/06	Hull	46-32	Cradley Heath
11/06	Cradley Heath	42-36	Hull
03/06	Hackney	49-29	Sheffield
02/06	Ipswich	38-40	Belle Vue
30/05	Reading	53-25	Halifax

Quarter-finals

Date	Team one	Score	Team two
22/08	Reading	51-27	Belle Vue
08/08	White City	50-28	Coventry
06/08	Kings Lynn	42-36	Hackney
05/08	Bristol	52-26	Hull
03/08	Coventry	43-35	White City
03/08	Hull	49-29	Bristol
29/07	Hackney	34-44	Kings Lynn

Semi-finals

Date	Team one	Score	Team two
14/10	Bristol	42-36	Reading
10/10	Reading	47-31	Bristol
24/09	Kings Lynn	44-34	White City
21/09	White City	42-34	Kings Lynn

Final

First leg

24 October 1977

Reading Racers John Davis 10 Dave Jessup 8 Hans Wassermann 7 Bengt Jansson 6 Doug Underwood 4 Bob Humphreys 3 Ian Gledhill 2	40 - 38	King's Lynn Stars Michael Lee 15 Terry Betts 12 Carl Glover 5 Ian Turner 5 Richard Hellsen 1 Billy Spiers 0 David Gagen 0

Smallmead Stadium

Second leg

26 October 1977

King's Lynn Stars Terry Betts 10 Michael Lee 7 Richard Hellsen 7 David Gagen 6 Ian Turner 6 Billy Spiers 3 Carl Glover 2	41 - 37	Reading Racers Dave Jessup 15 John Davis 8 Bengt Jansson 6 Doug Underwood 4 Bob Humphreys 3 Hans Wassermann 1 Ian Gledhill 0

King's Lynn Stadium

King's Lynn Stars were declared Knockout Cup Champions, winning on aggregate 79-77.

== Riders' Championship ==
Ole Olsen won the British League Riders' Championship for the third time, it was held at Hyde Road on 15 October and sponsored by Leyland Cars.

Pos.	Rider	Heat Scores	Total
1	(Denmark) Ole Olsen	3 3 3 3 3	15
2	(England) Peter Collins	3 3 3 2 3	14
3	(England) Michael Lee	3 2 2 3 3	13
4	(New Zealand) Ivan Mauger	3 2 2 2 3	12
5	(Finland) Ila Teromaa	2 3 1 3 2	11
6	(Poland) Edward Jancarz	2 1 3 2 1	9
7	(Scotland) Jim McMillan	1 3 1 1 2	8
8	(England) Doug Wyer	1 0 2 2 2	7
9	(England) Bob Kilby	0 2 3 1 1	7
10	(England) Dave Jessup	2 0 2 1 0	5
11	(Australia) Phil Herne	1 1 0 3 0	5
12	(England) Chris Pusey	0 2 1 0 1	4
13	(England) Gordon Kennett	1 1 1 0 1	4
14	(England) Ray Wilson	0 EF 0 1 2	3
15	(Australia) Billy Sanders	EF 1 0 0 0	1
16	(Wales) Graham Drury	2 0 0 0 0	2

- ef=engine failure, f=fell, x=excluded

== Pairs ==
The British League Pairs Championship was held at Foxhall Stadium on 29 September and was won by Ipswich Witches for the second consecutive year.

Pos	Team	Pts	Riders
1	Ipswich Witches	26	Billy Sanders 14, John Louis 12
2	King's Lynn Stars	23	Michael Lee 18, David Gagen 5
3	White City Rebels	20	Gordon Kennett 13, Steve Weatherley 7
4	Wolverhampton Wolves	17	Jim McMillan 10, Finn Thomsen 7
5	Reading Racers	17	Dave Jessup 10, John Davis 7
6	Belle Vue Aces	12	Alan Wilkinson 8, Chris Morton 4
7	Sheffield Tigers	11	Craig Pendlebury 6, Doug Wyer 5

== Spring Gold Cup ==
East Group

Team	PL	W	D	L	Pts
Reading	6	5	0	1	10
Ipswich	6	4	0	2	8
King's Lynn	6	2	0	4	4
Hackney	6	1	0	5	2

West Group

Team	PL	W	D	L	Pts
Poole	6	5	0	1	10
Exeter	6	3	0	3	6
Bristol	6	2	0	4	4
Wimbledon	6	2	0	4	4

East Group

Home \ Away	HAC	IPS	KL	REA
Hackney		31–46	41–37	37–41
Ipswich	46–32		45–33	36–42
King's Lynn	43–35	37–41		44–34
Reading	49–29	41–37	50–28	

Legend: Blue = home team win; Yellow = draw; Red = away team win.

West Group

Home \ Away	BRI	EX	PP	WIM
Bristol		38–39	54–24	55–22
Exeter	43–35		35–43	43–34
Poole	52–25	46–32		50–28
Wimbledon	44–33	45–32	37–41	

Legend: Blue = home team win; Yellow = draw; Red = away team win.

Final

Team one	Team two	Score
Poole	Reading	42-36, 30-48

== Final leading averages ==
	Rider	Nat	Team	C.M.A.
1	Michael Lee	(England)	King's Lynn	10.59
2	Ole Olsen	(Denmark)	Coventry	10.52
3	Ivan Mauger	(New Zealand)	Exeter	10.50
4	Peter Collins	(England)	Belle Vue	10.46
5	Gordon Kennett	(England)	White City	10.41
6	Anders Michanek	(Sweden)	Cradley	10.35
7	Dave Jessup	(England)	Reading	10.32
8	Malcolm Simmons	(England)	Poole	10.27
9	Billy Sanders	(Australia)	Ipswich	10.18
10	John Davis	(England)	Reading	9.80

== Midland Cup ==
Coventry won the Midland Cup for the second consecutive year. The competition consisted of six teams and was sponsored by the Trustee Savings Bank.

First round

Team one	Team two	Score
Birmingham	Swindon	36–42, 26–52
Leicester	Cradley	38–40, 31–47

Semi final round

Team one	Team two	Score
Coventry	Swindon	54–24, 48–29
Cradley	Wolverhampton	51–27, 38–40

Final

First leg

28 September 1977

Coventry Mitch Shirra 11 Ole Olsen 10 Tommy Nilsson 8 Mick Bell 6 Alan Molyneux 5 Frank Smith 4 Alf Busk 3	47–31	Cradley Heath Bruce Cribb 11 Bob Valentine 8 Steve Bastable 5 Larry Ross (guest) 4 Arthur Price 2 Dave Perks 1 Anders Michanek r/r

Brandon Stadium

Second leg

29 September 1977

Cradley Heath Bruce Cribb 12 Steve Bastable 6 Bob Valentine 5 Les Collins (guest) 5 Arthur Price 4 Dave Perks 4 Bernt Persson r/r	36–42	Coventry Mitch Shirra 13 Ole Olsen 12 Alan Molyneux 9 Tommy Nilsson 6 Mick Bell 1 Alf Busk 1 Frank Smith 0

Dudley Wood Stadium

Coventry won on aggregate 89–67

== Northern Trophy ==
		M	W	D	L	Pts
1	Belle Vue	4	4	0	0	8
2	Sheffield	5	3	0	2	6
3	Hull	5	2	0	3	4
4	Halifax	6	1	0	5	2

Home \ Away	BV	HAL	HUL	SHE
Belle Vue		52–26	n–h	n–h
Halifax	33–45		51–26	37–41
Hull	36–42	51–27		46–32
Sheffield	34–44	47–30	53–24	

Legend: Blue = home team win; Yellow = draw; Red = away team win.

== London Cup ==
White City Rebels won the London Cup. Two of their fixtures doubled up as League and Knockout Cup matches.

Pos	Team	P	W	D	L	F	A	Pts
1	White City	4	3	0	1	161	150	6
2	Wimbledon	4	2	1	1	170	141	5
3	Hackney	4	0	1	3	136	176	1

Results

Team	Score	Team
White City	42–36	Wimbledon
White City	46–32	Hackney
Wimbledon	51–27	Hackney
Wimbledon	44–33	White City
Hackney	38–40	White City
Hackney	39–39	Wimbledon

== Riders and final averages ==
Belle Vue

- (England) Peter Collins 10.46
- (England) Chris Morton 8.96
- (England) Alan Wilkinson 8.56
- (England) Les Collins 7.87
- (England) Russ Hodgson 5.90
- (England) Derek Richardson 5.07
- (England) Chris Turner 4.18
- (Denmark) Kristian Praestbro 3.72
- (England) Jim Brett 3.61
- (England) Steve Lawson 2.30

Birmingham

- (England) Ray Wilson 8.74
- (England) Alan Grahame 6.36
- (England) Richard Greer 5.58
- (Australia) Lou Sansom 5.00
- (Norway) Jan Terje Gravningen 4.95
- (England) Malcolm Shakespeare 4.75
- (Australia) Carl Askew 4.56
- (Australia) Stuart Mountford 4.10
- (Denmark) Finn Jensen 3.44

Bristol

- (Australia) Phil Crump 9.77
- (Australia) Phil Herne 9.23
- (United States) Steve Gresham 7.12
- (Norway) Tormod Langli 6.39
- (England) Nigel Boocock 6.06
- (England) Phil Bass 4.61
- (Australia) Danny Kennedy 4.56
- (Norway) Edgar Stangeland 3.71
- (England) Tom Leadbitter 3.19
- (Australia) Tony Garard 3.17
- (Wales) Brian Woodward 2.00

Coventry

- (Denmark) Ole Olsen 10.52
- (New Zealand) Mitch Shirra 8.22
- (England) Alan Molyneux 7.92
- (England) Mick Bell 7.79
- (Denmark) Alf Busk 6.38
- (Sweden) Tommy Nilsson 6.23
- (England) Frank Smith 3.85
- (England) Dave Mortiboys 2.00

Cradley Heath

- (Sweden) Anders Michanek 10.35
- (Sweden) Bernt Persson 8.34
- (England) Steve Bastable 7.86
- (New Zealand) Bruce Cribb 6.54
- (Australia) Bob Valentine 6.50
- (England) Dave Perks 6.00
- (England) Arthur Price 5.61

Exeter

- (New Zealand) Ivan Mauger 10.50
- (United States) Scott Autrey 9.13
- (Czech Republic) Václav Verner 8.59
- (Australia) John Titman 8.25
- (Australia) Mike Farrell 6.48
- (Australia) Steve Koppe 6.33
- (Zimbabwe) Peter Prinsloo 6.21
- (Austria) Walter Grubmuller 4.00

Hackney

- (England) Dave Morton 8.67 (5 matches only)
- (England) Keith White 7.45
- (England) Barry Thomas 6.51
- (England) Ted Hubbard 6.34
- (Denmark) Bent Rasmussen 4.68
- (England) Vic Harding 4.19
- (England) Tony Featherstone 4.07
- (England) Laurie Etheridge 3.88

Halifax

- (England) Chris Pusey 8.11
- (Netherlands) Henny Kroeze 7.37
- (Denmark) Mike Lohmann 7.14
- (England) Ian Cartwright 6.13
- (England) Graham Plant 6.10
- (Australia) Mick McKeon 4.83
- (England) Steve Finch 4.81
- (Norway) Tom Godal 3.80
- (England) Geoff Pusey 2.81

Hull

- (Wales) Graham Drury 8.63
- (Scotland) Bobby Beaton 8.01
- (England) Joe Owen 6.61
- (England) Tom Owen 6.00
- (United States) Mike Curoso 5.44
- (England) Frank Auffret 5.23
- (England) Mitch Graham 4.69
- (England) Phil Kynman 3.05

Ipswich

- (Australia) Billy Sanders 10.18
- (England) John Louis 9.50
- (England) Tony Davey 7.97
- (England) Andy Hines 5.40
- (England) Kevin Jolly 5.24
- (England) Ted Howgego 5.13
- (England) Mike Lanham 5.07
- (England) Dave Gooderham 4.62

King's Lynn

- (England) Michael Lee 10.59
- (England) Terry Betts 9.78
- (England) Ian Turner 7.36
- (England) David Gagen 5.93
- (Sweden) Richard Hellsen 5.17
- (England) Carl Glover 4.48
- (England) Paul Tyrer 4.07
- (England) Billy Spiers 3.25
- (England) Billy Burton 2.17

Leicester

- (Finland) Ila Teromaa 8.92
- (Australia) John Boulger 8.42
- (Australia) Garry Middleton 6.68
- (Poland) Bolesław Proch 5.17
- (Finland) Pepe Teromaa 4.74
- (Australia) Doug Underwood 4.04
- (Sweden) Tommy Pettersson 4.00
- (England) Ray Bales 3.89
- (Finland) Markku Helminen 3.33
- (Norway) Reidar Eide 3.24
- (Austria) Adi Funk 2.96
- (England) Chris Robins 2.96
- (Australia) John McNeill 2.29

Poole

- (England) Malcolm Simmons 10.27
- (Sweden) Christer Sjösten 7.47
- (England) Eric Broadbelt 7.02
- (England) Neil Middleditch 6.30
- (England) Colin Gooddy 5.54
- (England) Richard May 4.98
- (England) Pete Smith 4.56
- (England) Martin Yeates 4.52

Reading

- (England) Dave Jessup 10.32
- (England) John Davis 9.80
- (Sweden) Bengt Jansson 6.80
- (Australia) Bob Humphreys 6.05
- (England) Bernie Leigh 5.88
- (Germany) Hans Wassermann 5.58
- (Poland) Bolesław Proch 4.85
- (Australia) Doug Underwood 4.37
- (England) Ian Gledhill 3.26
- (Australia) Glyn Taylor 2.53

Sheffield

- (England) Doug Wyer 9.15
- (England) Reg Wilson 8.84
- (England) Craig Pendlebury 6.56
- (England) Arnold Haley 5.43
- (England) Keith Evans 5.05
- (Australia) Tony Boyle 4.31
- (England) Carl Glover 3.95
- (England) Billy Burton 3.25

Swindon

- (England) Martin Ashby 9.72
- (England) Bob Kilby 8.74
- (Sweden) Jan Andersson 7.61
- (England) Bobby McNeil 6.67
- (England) Geoff Bouchard 5.49
- (Sweden) Soren Karlsson 5.48
- (England) David Ashby 4.77
- (England) Kevin Young 3.04

White City

- (England) Gordon Kennett 10.41
- (England) Mike Sampson 7.35
- (England) Steve Weatherley 7.32
- (Poland) Marek Cieślak 7.15
- (Finland) Kai Niemi 6.85
- (England) Trevor Geer 6.84
- (England) Ian Clark 5.07
- (England) Dave Kennett 4.70

Wimbledon

- (Poland) Edward Jancarz 9.61
- (England) Mick Hines 7.80
- (England) Colin Richardson 7.74
- (New Zealand) Larry Ross 7.32
- (Sweden) Stefan Salomonsso 5.47
- (England) Roger Johns 5.46
- (New Zealand) Graeme Stapleton 4.23
- (England) Brendan Shiletto 3.67
- (Netherlands) Rudy Muts 2.80
- (England) Rob Jones 2.40

Wolverhampton

- (Scotland) Jimmy McMillan 8.68
- (Denmark) Finn Thomsen 8.17
- (Denmark) Hans Nielsen 7.25
- (Scotland) George Hunter 5.70
- (Sweden) Sören Sjösten 5.33
- (England) Rob Hollingworth 4.69
- (England) Steve Lomas 2.76

== See also ==
- List of United Kingdom Speedway League Champions
- Knockout Cup (speedway)
