= 1976 British League season =

British speedway season

- League: British League
- No. of competitors: 19
- Champions: Ipswich Witches
- Knockout Cup: Ipswich Witches
- Individual: Ole Olsen
- Pairs: Ipswich Witches
- Spring Gold Cup: Wimbledon Dons
- Midland Cup: Coventry Bees
- Northern Trophy: Belle Vue Aces
- Highest average: John Louis
- Division/s below: 1976 National League

The 1976 Gulf British League season was the 42nd season of the top tier of speedway in the United Kingdom and the 12th season known as the British League.

== Summary ==
The White City Rebels made their debut as did 1975 National League champions Birmingham Brummies. Oxford Cheetahs dropped down a division with White City inheriting both their riders and their nickname. The league was sponsored by Gulf Oil for a second season.

Ipswich Witches won their second consecutive title. The Witches team was once again headed by John Louis and Billy Sanders but this time Tony Davey also scored well with an average of 8.37, resulting in a comfortable league title success for the Suffolk team. The team then went on to claim the double on 28 October by winning the Knockout Cup.

Wimbledon Dons had the worst possible start to a season when their leading rider and the man touted to be a world champion Tommy Jansson died during a 1976 Individual Speedway World Championship meeting in Stockholm, on 20 May.

== Final table ==
Pos	Team	PL	W	D	L	Pts
1	Ipswich Witches	36	27	1	8	55
2	Belle Vue Aces	36	23	2	11	48
3	Exeter Falcons	36	23	2	11	48
4	Coventry Bees	36	21	2	13	44
5	Swindon Robins	36	19	4	13	42
6	Reading Racers	36	19	3	14	41
7	Hackney Hawks	36	20	0	16	40
8	Newport	36	19	1	16	39
9	Cradley United	36	19	1	16	39
10	Poole Pirates	36	18	1	17	37
11	Wolverhampton Wolves	36	18	1	17	37
12	Hull Vikings	36	18	0	18	36
13	White City Rebels	36	16	3	17	35
14	King's Lynn Stars	36	16	3	17	35
15	Halifax Dukes	36	14	1	21	29
16	Wimbledon Dons	36	12	3	21	27
17	Sheffield Tigers	36	13	1	22	27
18	Birmingham Brummies	36	7	0	29	14
19	Leicester Lions	36	5	1	30	11

M = Matches; W = Wins; D = Draws; L = Losses; Pts = Total Points

== Fixtures and results ==
Home \ Away	BV	BIR	COV	CH	EX	HAC	HAL	HV	IPS	KL	LEI	NEW	PP	RR	SHE	SWI	WC	WIM	WOL
Belle Vue		45–33	47–31	48–30	36–42	48–29	44–34	41–37	38–40	47–31	54–24	55–23	43–35	39–39	50–28	47–31	48–30	54–24	49–29
Birmingham	35–43		35–43	33–45	31–47	39–37	39–38	34–44	41–37	34–44	41–37	41–37	37–39	27–51	44–34	42–36	34–44	34–44	37–41
Coventry	40–38	45–33		47–31	41–37	51–37	47–31	41–37	41–37	44–34	50–28	52–26	52–26	46–2	42–35	54–24	47–31	46.5–31.5	53–25
Cradley Heath	48–30	52–26	39–39		40–38	42–36	41–37	39–38	45–33	43–35	44–34	43–35	47–31	40–38	43–35	40–38	41–37	48–30	37–41
Exeter	46–31	45–33	40–36	41–37		45–33	41–37	43–35	45–33	46–32	43–35	45–33	50–28	40–38	47–30	40–38	44–33	45–33	46–32
Hackney	38–40	50–28	41–37	43–35	45–33		44–34	42–35	29–49	41–36	40–38	42–36	46–32	45–30	45–32	41–37	41–36	45–33	43–35
Halifax	35–43	51–27	41.5–35.5	47–31	39–39	48–30		40–38	38–40	44–33	44–34	40–38	45–33	45–33	40–38	47–31	38–40	43–35	46–32
Hull	36–42	52–26	51–27	37–41	45–33	46–32	45–33		36–42	40–38	45–32	40–36	53–25	44–33	43–35	38–40	43–34	46–32	57–21
Ipswich	41–37	45–33	54–24	47–30	46–32	49–29	56–22	49–29		47–31	48–30	46–32	48–30	50–28	46–32	53–25	42–36	42–36	44–34
King's Lynn	39–39	54–24	49–29	47–31	36–39	49–29	43–35	41–37	44–34		50–27	46–32	51–27	40–38	52–26	39–39	42–36	41–37	35–43
Leicester	38–40	42–36	38–40	35–43	38–40	36–42	44–34	32–46	36–42	39–39		50–28	35–43	30–47	41–37	35–43	35–43	43–35	36–41
Newport	45–33	52.5–24.5	44–34	43–35	41–37	44–34	59–19	42–36	47–31	49–29	48–30		50–28	41–36	46–32	45–32	46–32	45–33	54–24
Poole	38–39	42–36	49–29	41–37	43–34	43–35	58–20	41–37	37–41	55–23	59–19	41–37		38–40	44–34	42–36	41–37	46–32	50–27
Reading	40–38	47–31	42–36	48–30	43–35	35–43	56–22	42–36	38–40	41–37	52–26	39–39	52–26		50–28	47–31	39–39	42–36	42–36
Sheffield	48–30	43–35	46–32	42–35	42–36	43–35	45–33	36–42	40–38	40–38	43–35	31–47	43–35	37–41		45–33	44–34	39–39	38–40
Swindon	40–38	52–26	39–39	45–33	39–39	42–35	51–27	45–33	39–39	45–33	44–34	54–24	48–30	41–37	53–25		47–31	52–25	52–26
White City	46–32	51–27	45–33	53–25	46–32	42–36	60–18	33.5–44.5	42–36	38–40	51–27	49–29	39–39	41–37	43–35	35–43		45–33	35–43
Wimbledon	35–43	44–34	38–40	40–38	42–35	38–39	48–30	45–33	34–44	40–37	54–24	47–31	43–35	40–38	52–26	38–40	39–39		39–39
Wolverhampton	31–46	50–26	46–32	40–38	38–40	38–40	49–29	43–35	32–46	40–38	42–36	46–32	37–41	32–46	44–34	41–37	47–31	42–36	

Legend: Blue = home team win; Yellow = draw; Red = away team win.

== Top ten riders (league averages) ==
	Rider	Nat	Team	C.M.A.
1	John Louis	(England)	Ipswich	11.10
2=	Ivan Mauger	(New Zealand)	Exeter	11.00
2=	Ole Olsen	(Denmark)	Coventry	11.00
4	Peter Collins	(England)	Belle Vue	10.98
5	Phil Crump	(Australia)	Newport	10.68
6	Dave Jessup	(England)	Reading	10.42
7	Malcolm Simmons	(England)	Poole	10.30
8	Dave Morton	(England)	Hackney	10.28
9	John Boulger	(Australia)	Cradley	9.93
10	Martin Ashby	(England)	Swindon	9.89

== British League Knockout Cup ==
The 1976 Speedway Star British League Knockout Cup was the 38th edition of the Knockout Cup for tier one teams. Ipswich Witches were the winners.

First round

Date	Team one	Score	Team two
04/05	Leicester	39–39	Halifax
29/04	Wimbledon	48–30	Birmingham
26/04	Birmingham	38–40	Wimbledon
10/04	Coventry	48–30	Wolverhampton
09/04	Wolverhampton	38–39	Coventry
27/03	Halifax	41–37	Leicester

Second round

Date	Team one	Score	Team two
31/07	Belle Vue	49–29	Wimbledon
01/07	Coventry	46–32	White City
27/06	Halifax	46–32	Hull
24/06	Wimbledon	35–43	Belle Vue
21/06	Exeter	46–32	Newport
12/06	Cradley Heath	34–44	Ipswich
10/06	Ipswich	39–38	Cradley Heath
09/06	Hull	44.5-33.5	Halifax
04/06	Hackney	40–38	Reading
04/06	Newport	47–31	Exeter
03/06	Sheffield	36–42	Kings Lynn
02/06	Poole	42–36	Swindon
31/05	Reading	37–41	Hackney
29/05	Swindon	54–24	Poole
26/05	White City	49–29	Coventry
22/05	Kings Lynn	42–36	Sheffield

Quarter-finals

Date	Team one	Score	Team two
18/09	Halifax	47–31	Hackney
03/09	Hackney	41–37	Halifax
26/08	Ipswich	45–33	Swindon
23/08	Belle Vue	45–33	Newport
18/08	White City	38–40	Kings Lynn
14/08	Kings Lynn	44–34	White City
13/08	Newport	40–38	Belle Vue
24/07	Swindon	44–34	Ipswich

Semi-finals

Date	Team one	Score	Team two
03/10	Halifax	42–35	Kings Lynn
02/10	Belle Vue	41–37	Ipswich
30/09	Ipswich	43–35	Belle Vue
29/09	Kings Lynn	46–32	Halifax

=== Final ===
First leg

17 October 1976

King's Lynn Stars Michael Lee12 Ian Turner 11 Terry Betts 7 David Gagen 3 Ray Bales 3 Richard Hellsen 1 Adi Funk 0	36–41	Ipswich Witches John Louis 11 Dave Gooderham 8 Tony Davey 7 Billy Sanders 6 Mike Lanham 4 Ted Howgego 3 Kevin Jolly 2

King's Lynn Stadium

Second leg

28 October 1976

Ipswich Witches John Louis 12 Billy Sanders 10 Tony Davey 8 Dave Gooderham 7 Mike Lanham 7 Ted Howgego 3 Kevin Jolly 3	50–27	King's Lynn Stars Terry Betts 10 Michael Lee 9 Ian Turner 5 Richard Hellsen 2 Billy Spiers 1 Pete Smith 0 David Gagen 0

Foxhall Stadium

Ipswich Witches were declared Knockout Cup Champions, winning on aggregate 91-63.

== Riders' Championship ==
Ole Olsen won the British League Riders' Championship for the second time, it was held at Hyde Road on 16 October and sponsored by Leyland Cars.

Pos.	Rider	Heat Scores	Total
1	(Denmark) Ole Olsen	3 3 3 3 3	15
2	(England) Peter Collins	3 2 3 3 3	14
3	(England) John Louis	3 3 3 2 2	13
4	(England) Martin Ashby	3 2 3 2 2	12
5	(England) Dave Jessup	2 3 2 3 1	11
6	(Australia) Phil Crump	0 3 1 1 3	8
7	(New Zealand) Barry Briggs	0 2 2 2 0	6
8	(Finland) Ila Teromaa	1 2 3 EF -	6
9	(England) Chris Pusey	EF 0 2 1 3	6
10	(England) Doug Wyer	1 2 1 0 1	5
11	(England) Gordon Kennett	1 1 1 EF 2	5
12	(New Zealand) Ivan Mauger	2 1 EF 2 -	5
13	(England) Dave Morton	2 EF 0 1 1	4
14	(England) Mick Hines (res)	1 2 0 - -	3
15	(England) Terry Betts	1 0 1 0 EF	2
16	(England) Malcolm Simmons	2 F R - -	2
17	(Scotland) Jim McMillan	0 1 0 0 0	1
18	(Australia) John Boulger (res)	F - - - -	0

- ef=engine failure, f=fell, x=excluded

== Pairs ==
The British League Pairs Championship was held at Foxhall Stadium on 19 October and was won by Ipswich Witches.

Pos	Team	Pts	Riders
1	Ipswich Witches	22	John Louis 12, Billy Sanders 10
2	Coventry Bees	21	Ole Olsen 14, Mitch Shirra 7
2	Belle Vue Aces	21	Peter Collins 15, Chris Morton 6
2	Cradley United	21	John Boulger 11, Bruce Cribb 10
5	Poole Pirates	18	Malcolm Simmons 15, Eric Broadbelt 3
6	Hackney Hawks	12	Dave Morton 6, Zenon Plech 6
7	Sheffield Tigers	8	Doug Wyer 5, Reg Wilson 3

== Final leading averages ==
	Rider	Nat	Team	C.M.A.
1	John Louis	(England)	Ipswich	11.08
2	Peter Collins	(England)	Belle Vue	11.06
3	Ole Olsen	(Denmark)	Coventry	11.05
4	Ivan Mauger	(New Zealand)	Exeter	10.86
5	Phil Crump	(Australia)	Newport	10.67
6	Dave Jessup	(England)	Reading	10.35
7	Dave Morton	(England)	Hackney	10.18
8	Malcolm Simmons	(England)	Poole	10.17
9	Martin Ashby	(England)	Swindon	9.88
10	John Boulger	(Australia)	Cradley	9.79

== Spring Gold Cup ==
East Group

Team	PL	W	D	L	Pts
Ipswich	8	7	0	1	14
Reading	8	5	0	3	10
White City	8	4	0	4	8
Hackney	8	3	0	5	6
King's Lynn	8	1	0	7	2

West Group

Team	PL	W	D	L	Pts
Wimbledon	6	4	0	2	8
Poole	6	4	0	2	8
Newport	6	3	0	3	6
Exeter	6	1	0	5	2

East Group

Home \ Away	HAC	IPS	KL	REA	WC
Hackney		23–55	41–37	45–33	41–37
Ipswich	41–37		51–27	40–38	47–31
King's Lynn	45–33	37–41		36–42	37–41
Reading	44–34	45–33	47–31		41–37
White City	42–36	37–41	40–38	48–30	

Legend: Blue = home team win; Yellow = draw; Red = away team win.

West Group

Home \ Away	EX	NEW	PP	WIM
Exeter		42–35	33–44	36–41
Newport	42–36		44–34	47–31
Poole	45–33	40–38		42–36
Wimbledon	41–36	46–32	46–32	

Legend: Blue = home team win; Yellow = draw; Red = away team win.

Final

Team one	Team two	Score
Wimbledon	Ipswich	40–38, 62–42

== Midland Cup ==
Coventry won the Midland Cup. The competition consisted of six teams.

First round

Team one	Team two	Score
Swindon	Leicester	49–29, 44–34
Cradley	Coventry	35–43, 28–50

Semi final round

Team one	Team two	Score
Wolverhampton	Swindon	44–34, 36–42
Birmingham	Coventry	31–47, 28–50

Final

First leg

17 October 1976

Coventry Jiri Stancl 17 Mitch Shirra 11 Ole Olsen 9 Alan Molyneux 7 Frank Smith 4 John Haarhy 2 Nigel Boocock r/r	50–28	Wolverhampton Jim McMillan 10 Bruce Cribb (guest) 7 George Hunter 6 John Jackson 3 Bob Valentine (guest) 2 Leif Berlin 0 Tony Gillias (guest) 0

Brandon Stadium

Second leg

22 October 1976

Wolverhampton Rob Hollingworth 11 Bruce Cribb (guest) 7 Jim McMillan 6 George Hunter 6 John Jackson 5 Steve Bastable (guest) 2 Leif Berlin 2	39–37	Coventry Jiri Stancl 12 Ole Olsen 12 Mitch Shirra 7 Frank Smith 4 Alan Molyneux 2 John Haarhy 0 Nigel Boocock r/r

Monmore Green Stadium

Coventry won on aggregate 87–67

== Northern Trophy ==
		M	W	D	L	Pts
1	Belle Vue	6	5	1	0	11
2	Sheffield	6	3	0	3	6
3	Halifax	6	2	2	2	6
4	Hull	6	0	1	5	0

Home \ Away	BV	HAL	HUL	SHE
Belle Vue		39–39	48–30	51–27
Halifax	37–41		40–38	40–38
Hull	36–42	39–39		38–40
Sheffield	38–40	55–23	46–32	

Legend: Blue = home team win; Yellow = draw; Red = away team win.

== Riders and final averages ==
Belle Vue

- (England) Peter Collins 11.06
- (England) Chris Morton 9.53
- (England) Alan Wilkinson 7.56
- (England) Les Collins 6.34
- (England) Paul Tyrer 5.75
- (Denmark) Kristian Praestbro 5.37
- (England) Chris Turner 5.18
- (England) Russ Hodgson 4.41
- (England) Geoff Pusey 3.83

Birmingham

- (England) Alan Grahame 8.00
- (Australia) Garry Middleton 6.71
- (Sweden) Sören Sjösten 6.69
- (Australia) Lou Sansom 6.07
- (Norway) Jan Terje Gravningen 5.23
- (England) Arthur Browning 4.99
- (Australia) Bob Valentine 4.72
- (Norway) Audun Ove Olsen 4.37
- (Australia) Carl Askew 1.78
- (Australia) Ricky Day 1.00

Coventry

- (Denmark) Ole Olsen 11.05
- (New Zealand) Mitch Shirra 8.26
- (Czech Republic) Jiří Štancl 6.81
- (England) Alan Molyneux 6.67
- (England) Nigel Boocock 6.53
- (England) John Harrhy 4.64
- (England) Frank Smith 4.60
- (England) Ian Hindle 2.10

Cradley Heath

- (Australia) John Boulger 9.79
- (Sweden) Bernt Persson 9.16
- (New Zealand) Bruce Cribb 7.72
- (England) Arthur Price 5.71
- (England) Dave Perks 5.21
- (England) Steve Bastable 5.20
- (England) Nigel Wasley 3.16

Exeter

- (New Zealand) Ivan Mauger 10.86
- (United States) Scott Autrey 9.24
- (Australia) John Titman 6.99
- (England) Kevin Holden 6.45
- (Australia) Steve Koppe 5.16
- (Australia) Geoff Mudge 4.86
- (Zimbabwe) Peter Prinsloo 3.54
- (England) Les Rumsey 3.48
- (Poland) Kazimierz Adamczak 2.23

Hackney

- (England) Dave Morton 10.18
- (Poland) Zenon Plech 7.92
- (England) Barry Thomas 6.67
- (England) Keith White 6.33
- (England) Laurie Etheridge 5.51
- (England) Trevor Hedge 5.37
- (England) Steve Lomas 4.95
- (England) Ted Hubbard 4.80
- (England) Dave Kennett 4.18

Halifax

- (England) Chris Pusey 8.74
- (Netherlands) Henny Kroeze 7.69
- (England) Graham Plant 7.49
- (Australia) Charlie Monk 5.98
- (England) Ian Cartwright 5.87
- (Denmark) Mike Lohmann 4.95
- (England) Andy Cusworth 4.46
- (England) Grahame Dawson 4.00
- (England) Mick Newton 3.29
- (England) Steve Finch 3.14

Hull

- (New Zealand) Barry Briggs 8.94
- (England) Joe Owen 8.86
- (Germany) Egon Müller 8.75
- (Scotland) Bobby Beaton 7.55
- (England) Mitch Graham 7.50
- (England) Frank Auffret 6.17
- (United States) Mike Curoso 6.07
- (Wales) Graham Drury 5.88
- (England) Tom Owen 5.69

Ipswich

- (England) John Louis 11.08
- (Australia) Billy Sanders 9.44
- (England) Tony Davey 8.37
- (England) Mike Lanham 6.21
- (England) Ted Howgego 5.87
- (England) Dave Gooderham 5.71
- (England) Kevin Jolly 4.21
- (England) Trevor Jones 3.87
- (England) Andy Hines 3.70

King's Lynn

- (England) Terry Betts 9.71
- (England) Michael Lee 9.43
- (England) Ian Turner 7.83
- (England) David Gagen 5.68
- (England) Ray Bales 5.40
- (Sweden) Richard Hellsen 4.56
- (England) Billy Burton 3.85
- (Denmark) Jan Henningsen 3.50
- (Austria) Adi Funk 2.80

Leicester

- (England) Ray Wilson 9.28
- (Norway) Reidar Eide 7.89
- (Finland) Ila Teromaa 7.86
- (England) Tony Lomas 5.08
- (Australia) Doug Underwood 4.53
- (England) Alan Emerson 3.86
- (Finland) Pepe Teromaa 3.08
- (Poland) Grzegorz Szczepanik 2.37
- (Denmark) Ernst Bøgh 0.76

Newport

- (Australia) Phil Crump 10.67
- (Australia) Phil Herne 9.70
- (United States) Steve Gresham 7.41
- (Wales) Brian Woodward 6.15
- (England) Bob Coles 5.00
- (Australia) Neil Street 4.90
- (Norway) Tormod Langli 4.71
- (Australia) Danny Kennedy 4.62
- (Poland) Kazimierz Adamczak 4.17
- (England) Barney Kennett 3.92

Poole

- (England) Malcolm Simmons 10.17
- (England) Eric Broadbelt 7.14
- (Sweden) Christer Sjösten 6.67
- (England) Pete Smith 6.16
- (England) Neil Middleditch 5.05
- (England) Richard May 5.04
- (England) Martin Yeates 4.32

Reading

- (England) Dave Jessup 10.35
- (England) John Davis 9.33
- (England) Bernie Leigh 6.75
- (Australia) Bob Humphreys 6.42
- (Poland) Bolesław Proch 5.37
- (England) Mick Bell 5.16
- (Poland) Eugeniusz Blaszak 3.67
- (England) Ian Gledhill 2.32

Sheffield

- (England) Doug Wyer 9.62
- (England) Reg Wilson 8.51
- (England) Keith Evans 5.80
- (England) Craig Pendlebury 5.36
- (England) Carl Glover 5.23
- (Sweden) Bengt Larsson 3.72
- (England) Les Glover 3.21
- (Australia) Tony Boyle 3.08
- (England) Nicky Allott 3.03

Swindon

- (England) Martin Ashby 9.88
- (England) Bob Kilby 9.22
- (England) Bobby McNeil 7.62
- (Sweden) Jan Andersson 6.46
- (Sweden) Soren Karlsson 6.38
- (England) Geoff Bouchard 6.02
- (England) Norman Hunter 5.52
- (England) David Ashby 3.89
- (England) Cliff Anderson 2.00

White City

- (England) Gordon Kennett 9.69
- (Norway) Dag Lövaas 7.76
- (England) Richard Greer 7.07
- (England) Trevor Geer 6.67
- (England) Steve Weatherley 6.00
- (England) Paul Gachet 5.34
- (England) Brian Clark 5.05
- (Finland) Kai Niemi 4.85
- (Sweden) Richard Hellsen 3.41

Wimbledon

- (Sweden) Tommy Jansson 10.25 (only 8 matches)
- (England) Mick Hines 7.32
- (Norway) Edgar Stangeland 7.27
- (New Zealand) Larry Ross 7.24
- (Sweden) Stefan Salomonsson 4.14
- (England) Colin Richardson 4.10
- (England) Barry Crowson 4.05
- (England) Roger Johns 3.91
- (England) Brendan Shiletto 2.13

Wolverhampton

- (Scotland) Jimmy McMillan 8.97
- (Denmark) Finn Thomsen 7.58
- (Scotland) George Hunter 7.55
- (England) John Jackson 4.95
- (England) Rob Hollingworth 4.89
- (Denmark) Leif Berlin 3.84
- (Italy) Giuseppe Marzotto 3.22

== See also ==
- List of United Kingdom Speedway League Champions
- Knockout Cup (speedway)
