= 1977 Individual Speedway Junior European Championship =

European motorcycle speedway event

European Under-21 Championship
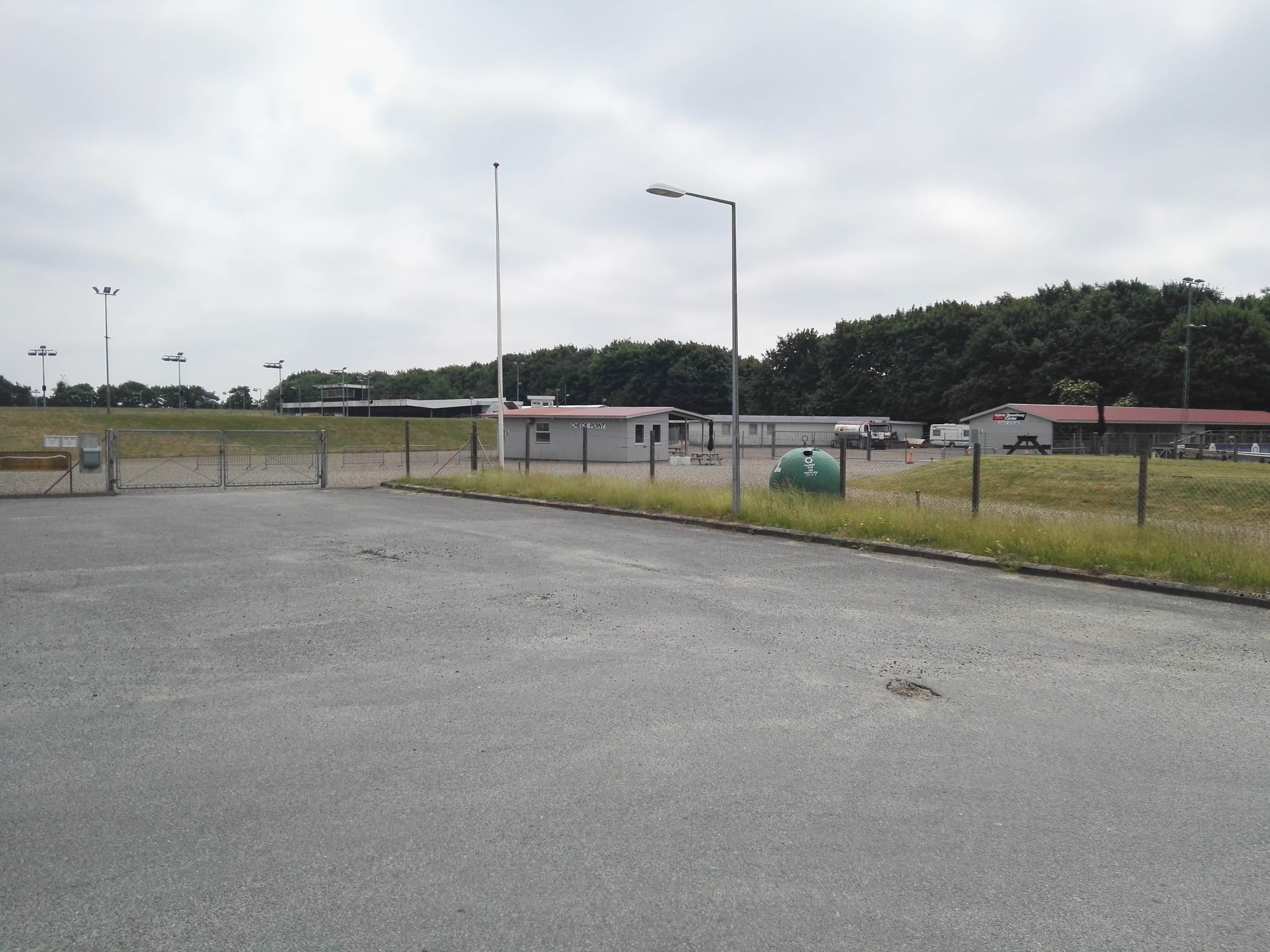
- The new Vojens Speedway Center hosted the inaugural Championship
- Venue: Vojens Speedway Center
- Location: Vojens, Denmark
- Start date: 24 July 1977

The 1977 Individual Speedway Junior European Championship was the inaugural edition of the European Under-21 Championships.

The Championship was won by Alf Busk.

== European Final ==
- 24 July 1977
- (Denmark) Vojens Speedway Center, Vojens
- only 12 heats - abandoned due to rain, result stands

Placing	Rider	Total	1	2	3	4	5	6	7	8	9	10	11	12	13	14	15	16	17	18	19	20	Pts	Pos
1	(Denmark) (16) Alf Busk	9				3				3	3												9	1
2	(England) (1) Joe Owen	8	3				3				2												8	2
3	(England) (13) Les Collins	7				2	2							3									7	3
4	(Soviet Union) (3) Zaytun Gafurov	6	1						2				3										6	4
5	(Denmark) (2) Hans Nielsen	6	2					1				3											6	5
6	(West Germany) (8) Peter Lempenhauer	6		3						1			2										6	6
7	(Sweden) (10) Lars Ericsson	6			3			2						1									6	7
8	(Poland) (14) Mariusz Okoniewski	4				0		3					1										4	8
9	(Sweden) (4) Lillebror Johansson	4	0							2				2									4	9
10	(Poland) (11) Andrzej Huszcza	3			0				3		0												3	10
11	(West Germany) (12) Franz Kreimoser	3			1					0		2											3	11
12	(Soviet Union) (6) Aleksandr Halyavin	3		2				X			1												3	12
13	(Czechoslovakia) (9) Jiri Svoboda	3			2		1						0										3	13
14	(Netherlands) (15) Rudy Muts	2				1			1			X											2	14
15	(Bulgaria) (5) Nikolaj Manev	2		1			0					1											2	15
16	(Italy) (7) Paulo Noro	0		0					0					0									0	16
R1	(England) (R1) Neil Middleditch	0																					0	R1
R2	(England) (R2) Keith White	0																					0	R2
Placing	Rider	Total	1	2	3	4	5	6	7	8	9	10	11	12	13	14	15	16	17	18	19	20	Pts	Pos

m - exclusion for exceeding two minute time allowance • t - exclusion for touching the tapes • x - other exclusion • e - retired or mechanical failure • f - fell • ns - non-starter • nc - non-classify

gate A - inside	gate B	gate C	gate D - outside
