= Mike Sampson =

British speedway rider (born 1945)

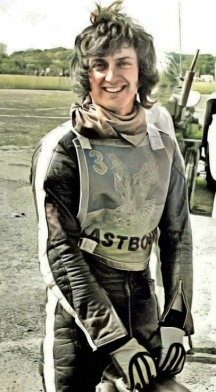
- Born: 8 August 1945 (age 81); Exeter, England
- Nationality: British (English)

Career history
- 1971: Romford Bombers
- 1972: West Ham Hammers
- 1972–1973: Barrow Happy Faces/Bombers
- 1972–1975: Exeter Falcons
- 1974–1978: Eastbourne Eagles
- 1977–1978: White City Rebels
- 1979–1980: Nottingham Outlaws
- 1979–1980: Cradley Heathens
- 1981–1982: Stoke Potters

Team honours
- 1974, 1977: British League Champion
- 1977: National League Champion
- 1975, 1977, 1978: New/National League KO Cup Winner

Mike Sampson (born 8 August 1945) is a former speedway rider from England.

== Speedway career ==
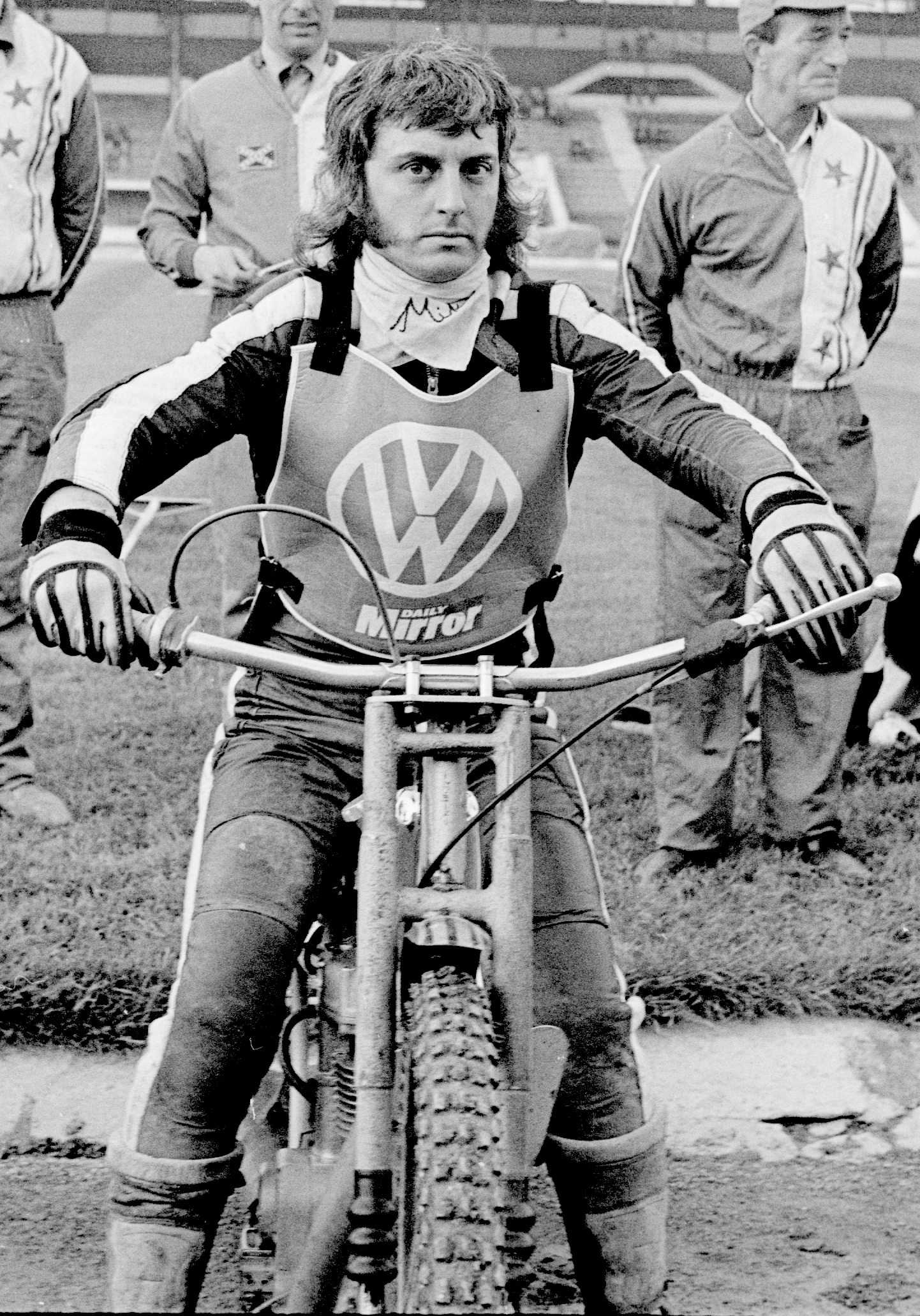
Mike Sampson

Sampson rode in the top tier of British Speedway from 1971 to 1982, riding for multiple clubs. He started his career at Romford Bombers before going on to ride for West Ham Hammers and Barrow.

Sampson was a member of the Exeter Falcons team that won the 1974 British League and doubled up for Eastbourne Eagles in division 2.

Sampson continued to ride for Eastbourne and also rode for the White City Rebels team that won the 1977 British League. In 1978, Sampson won the Daily Mirror Sword title.

In 1979, Sampson rode for Nottingham Outlaws and in 1980 for Cradley Heathens before finishing his career with Stoke Potters from 1981 to 1982 as the club captain.
