= White City Rebels =

English former motorcycle speedway team, based in London

Club information
- Track address: White City Stadium; Wood Lane; London
- Country: England
- Founded: 1929
- Closed: 1978

Club facts
- Colours: Red, White and Blue
- Track size: 420 yards (380 metres)

Major team honours
British League Champions	1977

The White City Rebels were a motorcycle speedway team who operated from the White City Stadium, Wood Lane in London, England.

== History ==
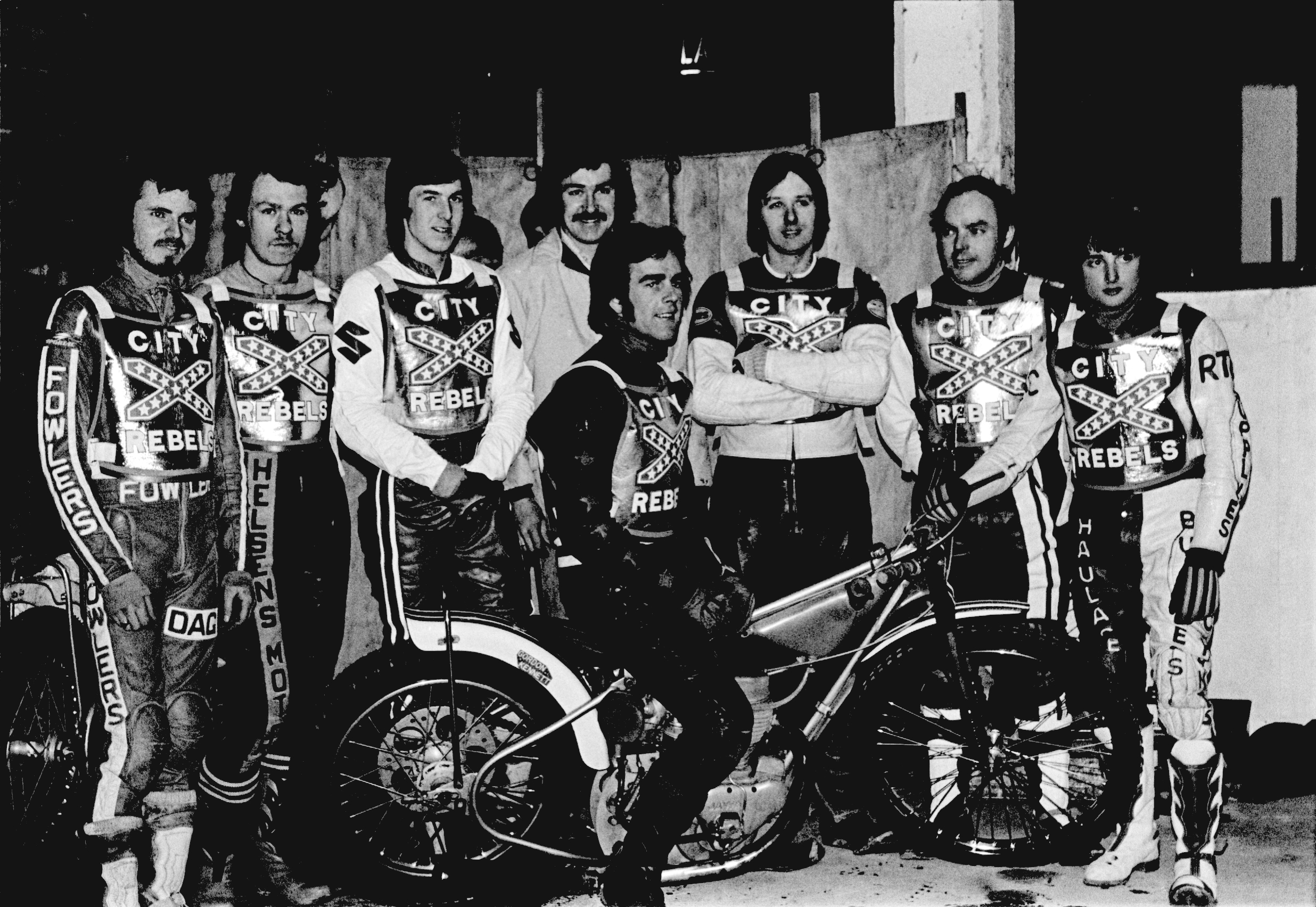
Opening night as the Rebels in 1976

In 1928 the new sport known as dirt track arrived from Australia and the White City Stadium brought speedway to the newly regenerated greyhound stadium. After holding a series on open meetings a team was created and White City were inaugural members of the Southern League in 1929 but only raced for the one season. The White City team were due to race in the 1930 Southern League, but they withdrew from the league before it started due to track reconstruction.

The stadium then ran once again using an open licence and held occasional one-off meetings between (1953–1958, 1961).

In 1976 a new league team was formed, from the Oxford Rebels team. They re-opened in 1976 under the promoters Danny Dunton and Bob Dugard. They were managed by Danny Dunton's son, Lee Dunton. They had previously raced at Oxford as the Oxford Rebels, but a threat of track closure and sell-off for development in 1975 caused the promoters to seek a new venue.

The Rebels retained the majority of the Oxford riders and Gordon Kennett led the team to a 15th place finish during the 1976 British League season. In 1977, White City Rebels won the title, winning 27 league fixtures during the 1977 British League season ending with 55 points in only their second season of existence. The London team caused a surprise with their consistent form throughout the season with heavy scoring of Gordon Kennett, supported by a group of five other riders hitting around a seven average to support Kennett. The five were Englishmen Mike Sampson, Steve Weatherley and Trevor Geer, Pole Marek Cieślak and Finn Kai Niemi.

With much the same team the Rebels could only manage a 15th place finish in 1978. The White City Stadium hosted three World Cup finals in 1976, 1979 and 1982.

The team closed after only three seasons due to poor crowds levels, despite being the 1977 champions of the British League. The teams riders and assets were sold to Eastbourne Eagles.

From 1979 to 1983 the stadium used an Open Licence and hosted a number of high-profile Speedway World Championship qualifying rounds, including the Overseas and Intercontinental Finals during the 1970s, and 1980s. It also hosted the Final of the Speedway World Team Cup in 1976, 1979 and 1982.

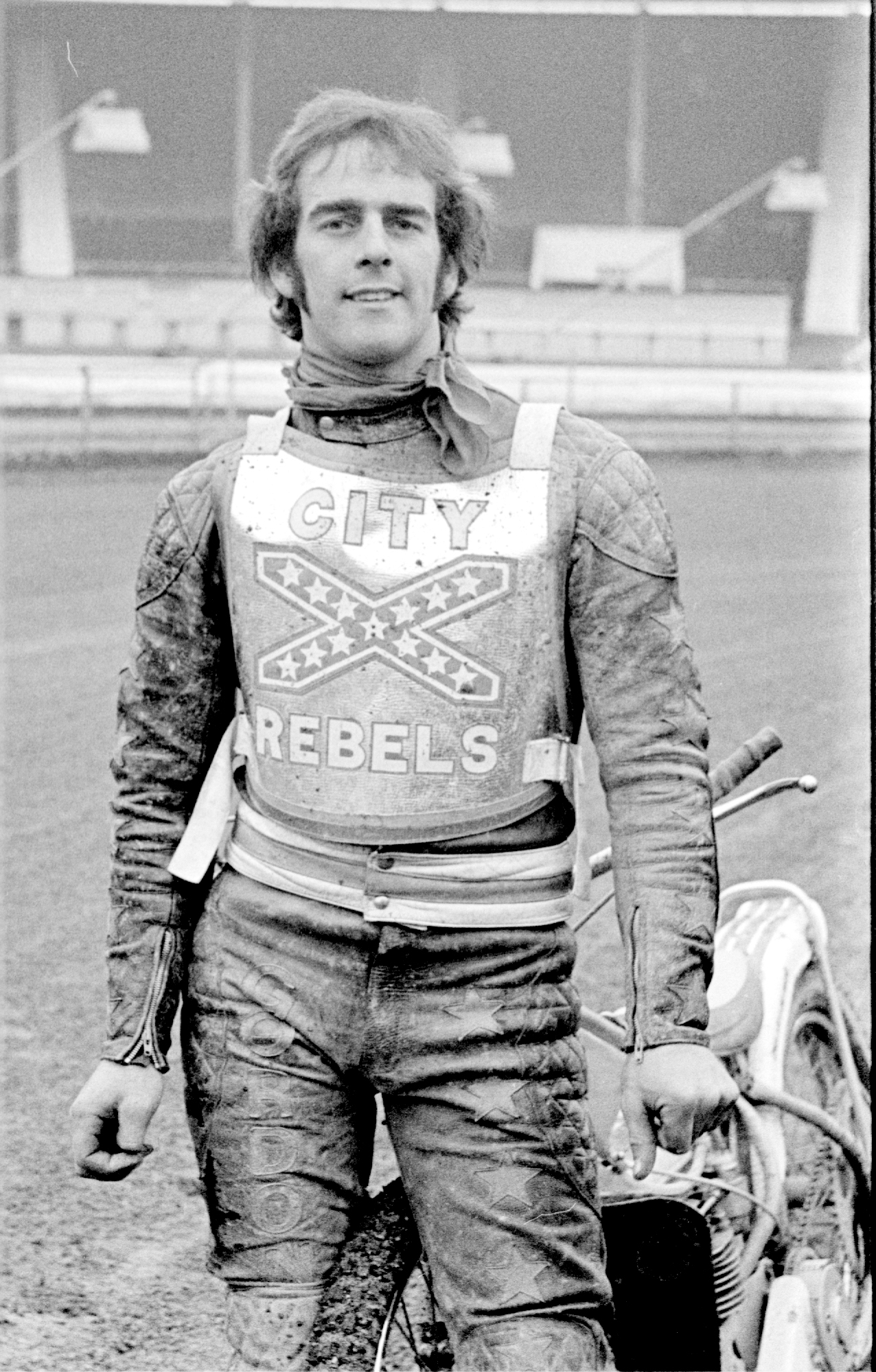
Gordon Kennett in Rebels colours

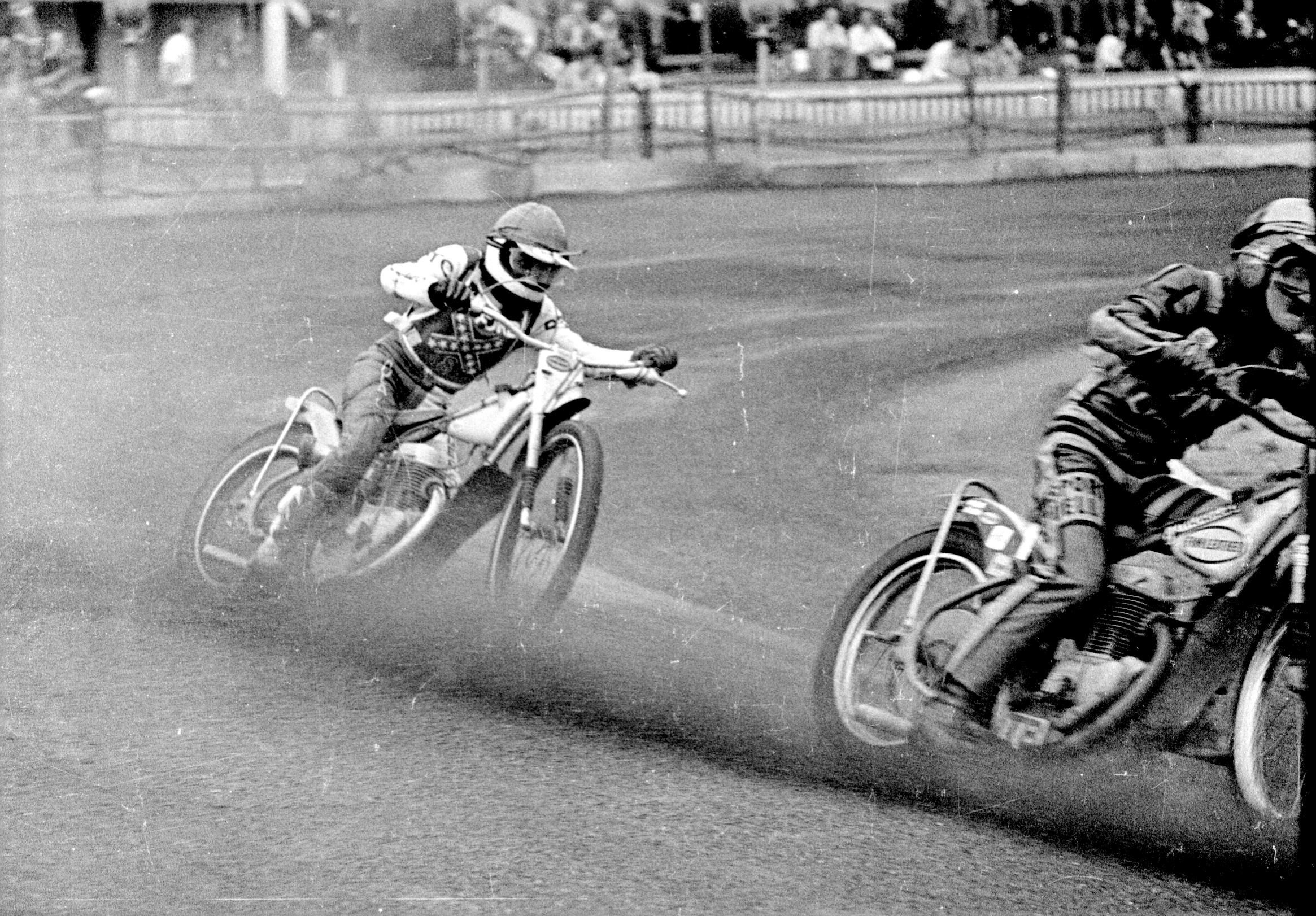
Paul Gachet riding for the Rebels

== Notable riders ==
- Marek Cieślak
- Trevor Geer
- Gordon Kennett
- Kai Niemi
- Mike Sampson
- Steve Weatherley

== Season summary ==
Extended content

Year and league	Position	Notes
1929 Speedway Southern League	7th	
1976 British League season	13th	
1977 British League season	1st	Champions
1978 British League season	15th	
