= Derek Harrison (speedway rider) =

British former motorcycle speedway rider (born 1959)

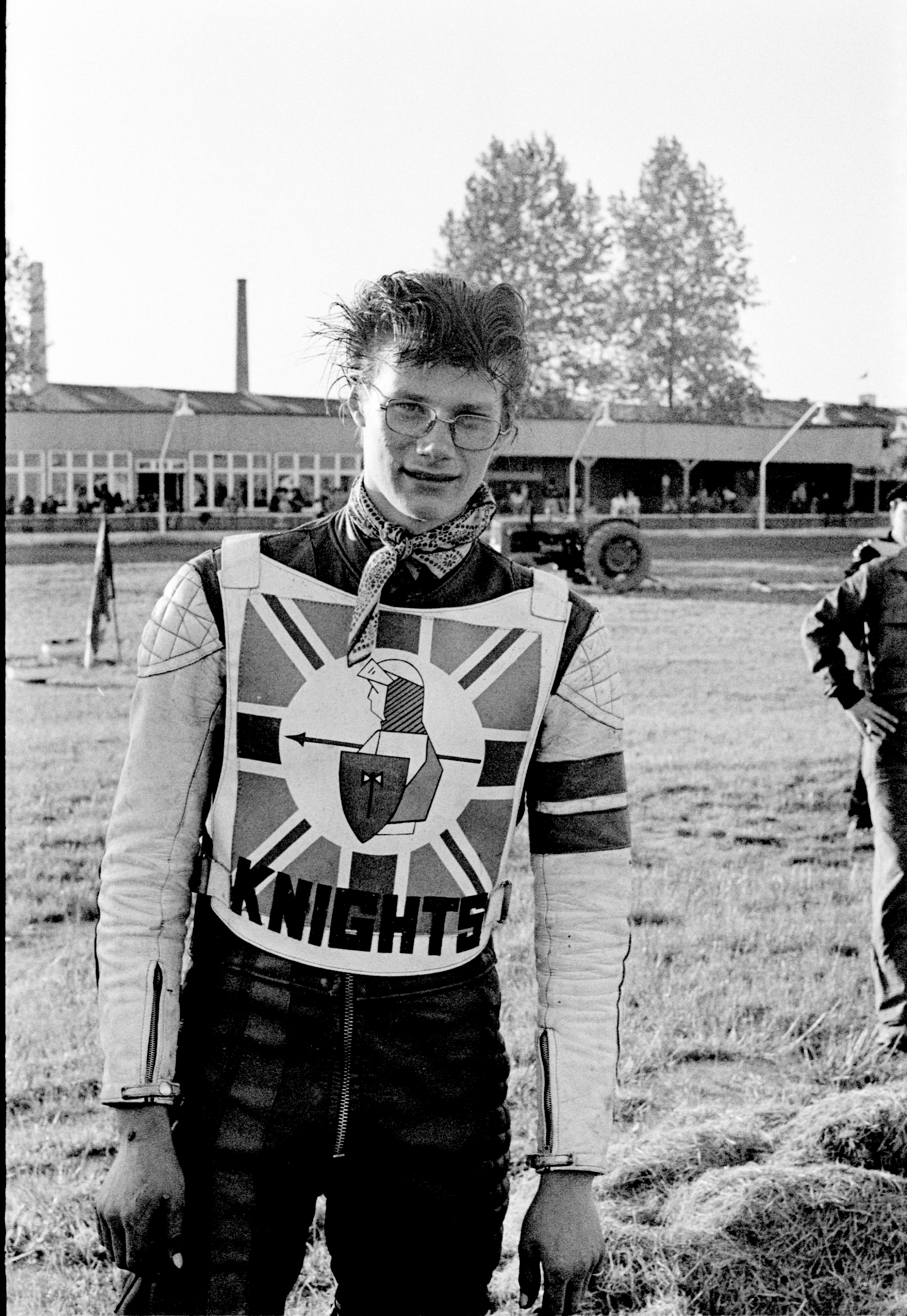
- British speedway rider
- Born: 1 May 1959 (age 67); Brandon, Suffolk, England
- Nationality: British (English)

Career history
- 1976: Boston Barracudas
- 1978-1979: Milton Keynes Knights
- 1978-1980: King's Lynn Stars
- 1980-1981: Oxford Cheetahs
- 1980: Cradley Heathens
- 1982-1983: Mildenhall Fen Tigers
- 1982: Leicester Lions
- 1984: Peterborough Panthers
- 1985: Eastbourne Eagles

Derek Charles Ernest Harrison (born 1 May 1959) is a former motorcycle speedway rider from England.

== Career ==
Harrison, born in Brandon, Suffolk, began his career in 1976 with Boston Barracudas. Between 1978 and 1980, he rode for both his parent club King's Lynn Stars in the British League and between 1978 and 1979 rode in the National League (NL) with Milton Keynes Knights. In 1980, he transferred to Cradley Heathens and also rode in the National League on loan for Oxford Cheetahs in 1980 and 1981.

In 1982 and 1983, Harrison rode for Mildenhall Fen Tigers in the NL as well as spells with Leicester Lions, Reading Racers, and Birmingham Brummies in the top flight. In 1984, he transferred to Peterborough Panthers for a transfer fee of £10,000 before spending his final season with Eastbourne Eagles.

Harrison represented England at National League level in two matches against Scotland in 1979.
