= Milton Keynes Knights =

British speedway team

Club information
- Track address: Groveway (1978–1988); Elfield Park (1989–1992)
- Country: England
- Founded: 1978
- Closed: 1992

Club facts
- Colours: Red, white and blue
- Track size: 307 yards

Major team honours
National League Pairs	1979
Midland Development League	2012, 2014

The Milton Keynes Knights are a former Speedway team, which operated from 1978 until their closure in 1992. The team were revived from 2012 to 2018 racing at various venues outside of Milton Keynes.

== History ==
=== Origins and 1970s ===
Former Leicester and Teesside promoter Ron Wilson brought speedway to Milton Keynes in 1978 with a team called the Knights who would race at the Milton Keynes Greyhound Stadium in Ashland (known in speedway circles as the Groveway). The first meeting was an individual meeting on 28 March, with the opening ceremony conducted by Johnnie Hoskins but the first team match was on 4 April against Oxford Cheetahs.

The inaugural league season ended with a 16th-place finish during the 1978 National League season, The team would have finished lower had it not been for the riding of Bob Humphreys. The following season was much better with the team improving to 5th and claiming the 1979 National League Pairs, held at The Shay on 21 July, courtesy of Humphreys and Andy Grahame.

=== 1980s ===
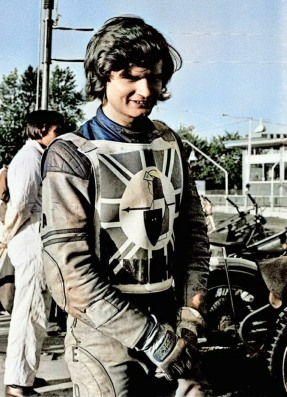
Andy Grahame

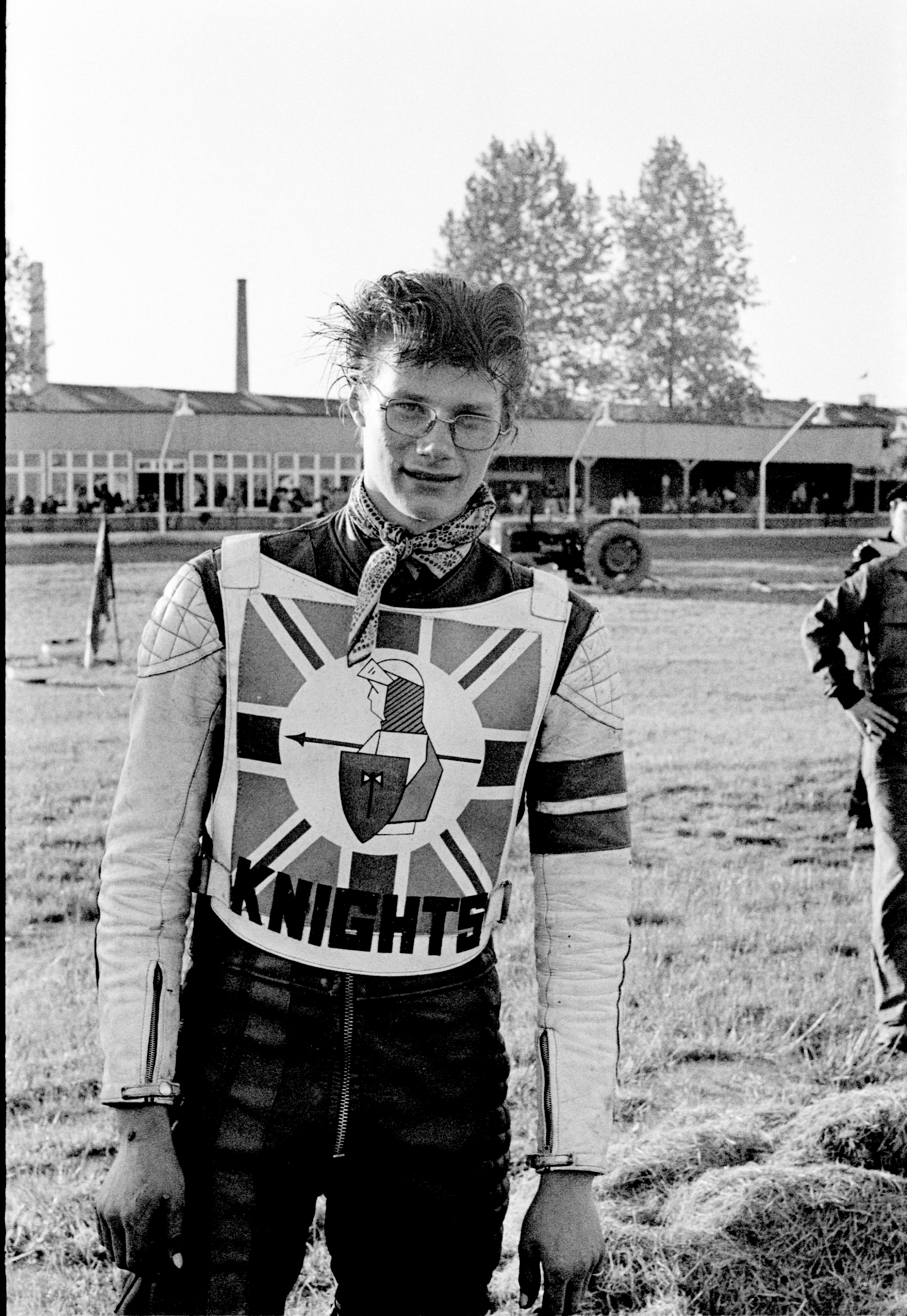
Derek Harrison

The team continued to compete in division 2 (known as the National League at the time) but lost Grahame and Derek Harrison, leaving the Knights struggling to 19th place out of 20. A best place finish of 3rd in 1987 was the highlight of the decade. The leading Knights riders during the period was Keith White.

In November 1988, promoter Terry Cheney moved the Knights out of the Groveway following issues with the landlords. In early 1989 work began on a new site at Elfield Park, which already housed a speedway training school known as Bleak Hall. Terry Cheney entered into negotiations with the Milton Keynes Development Corporation and Milton Keynes Borough Council. After an agreement for a two-year lease was reached, a significant sum was spent adding facilities including terrapin buildings. The first match at Elfield Park took place on 18 April against Peterborough Panthers.

Unfortunately the first season at their new home resulted in a last place 18th.

=== 1990s ===
The 1990 season was worse than the last, with the Knights only managing six league wins all season. With the return of Australian Troy Butler in 1991 and Ted Jarvis coming in as promoter, the situation seemed to be improving until financial debts resulted in a temporary suspension enforced by the BSPA.

In 1992, the club was taken over by former team manager Roger Jones and Colin Hill but the BSPA withdrew the speedway licence following complaints over the state of the track and several days later on 24 June, the club was wound-up.

=== 2010s ===
The Knights returned in 2012, competing in the junior/amateur Midland Development League, with home matches staged initially staged at Rye House Stadium. The Knights continued to track share until 2018, having raced out of Mildenhall and Peterborough. They won the league in both 2012 and 2014.

== Season summary ==
Extended content

Year and league	Position	Notes
1978 National League season	16th	
1979 National League season	5th	
1980 National League season	19th	
1981 National League season	19th	
1982 National League season	12th	
1983 National League season	6th	
1984 National League season	7th	
1985 National League season	11th	
1986 National League season	8th	
1987 National League season	3rd	
1988 National League season	6th	
1989 National League season	18th	
1990 National League season	17th	
1991 British League Division Two season	17th	
1992 British League Division Two season	N/A	results expunged

== Notable riders ==
- (Australia) Troy Butler
- (England) Andy Grahame
- (England) Derek Harrison
- (England) Bob Humphreys
- (England) Keith White

== See also ==
- List of United Kingdom Speedway League Champions
- Knockout Cup (speedway)
