= Vic Harding =

Motorcycle speedway rider

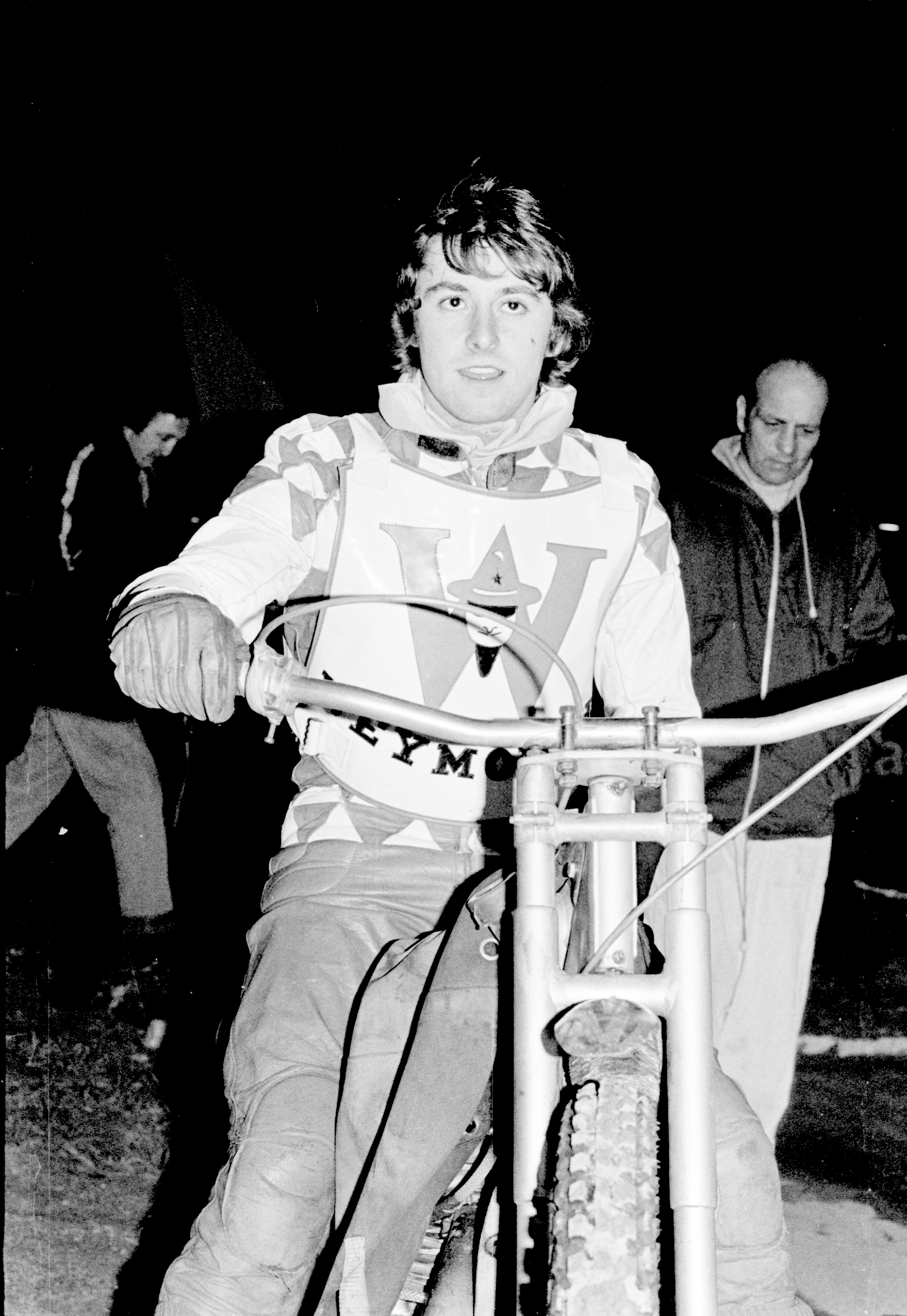
- Born: 5 July 1952; East Ham, London, England
- Died: 8 June 1979 (aged 26)
- Nationality: British (English)

Career history
- 1974: Sunderland Gladiators
- 1975-1977: Weymouth Wizards
- 1975: Exeter Falcons
- 1977-1979: Hackney Hawks
- 1977: Crayford Kestrels

Victor John Harding (5 July 1952 in East Ham, London – 8 June 1979 Whipps Cross, London) was a motorcycle speedway rider.

== Career ==
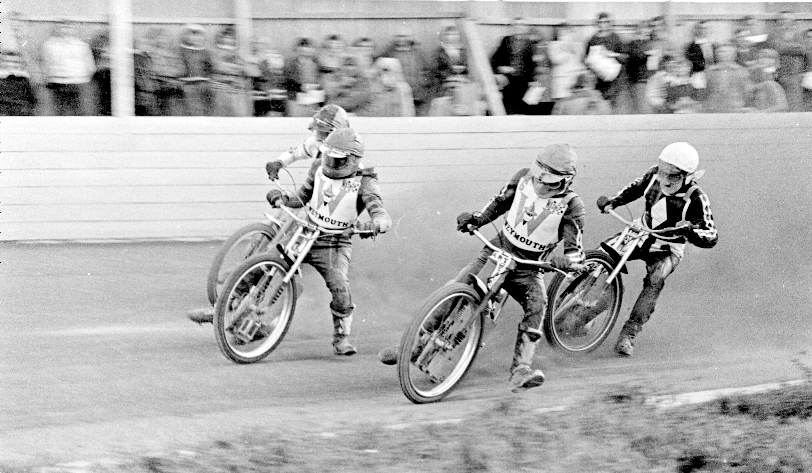
Vic Harding (left) in action for Weymouth during 1975

Harding began at the Rye House training school in 1970 run by Len Silver and spent several seasons trying to break into a league team.

In 1974, the Sunderland Gladiators handed Harding the chance. In 1975, he moved to Weymouth Wizards. He became the club captain at Weymouth.

In 1977, Len Silver signed Harding for the Hackney Hawks from Weymouth and spent most of that season as reserve. In 1978, he began improving so much that by 1979, he was a heat leader.

== Death ==
Tragedy struck on 8 June 1979 when Harding was killed whilst riding for Hackney at Hackney Wick Stadium, Waterden Road. He was in a heat as a replacement for Bo Petersen, but during the race, he was involved in a terrible crash with Steve Weatherley. Harding was killed and Weatherley was left with a broken back and paraplegia.

Following this tragic accident, the Hawks hosted a Vic Harding Memorial Trophy every season in Harding's honour. It was in fact the last ever meeting hosted by the Hackney Hawks.

== See also ==
- Rider deaths in motorcycle speedway
