= Alf Busk =

Danish speedway rider

- Born: 16 April 1958 (age 68); Silkeborg, Denmark
- Nationality: Danish

Career history
- 1977-1982: Coventry Bees
- 1983-1985: Swindon Robins
- 1985: Sheffield Tigers

Individual honours
- 1977: European Junior Champion

Team honours
- 1978, 1979: British League Champion
- 1981: British League Cup
- 1977, 1978, 1979, 1981, 1982: Midland Cup
- 1980: Midland League

Alf Busk (born 16 April 1958) is a Danish former speedway rider. He earned eight caps for the Denmark national speedway team.

== Speedway career ==
Busk won the gold medal at the Individual Speedway Junior European Championship in the 1977 Individual Speedway Junior European Championship.

Busk rode in the top tier of British Speedway from 1977 to 1985, riding for Coventry Bees, Sheffield Tigers and Swindon Robins.

Busk's career at Coventry resulted in two league championship titles, one league cup and five Midland Cup wins.

== World final appearances ==
=== World Longtrack Championship ===
- 1979 – (Czech Republic) Mariánské Lázně 15th 3pts

== European final appearances ==
=== European Under-21 ===
- 1977 - (Denmark) Vojens, Vojens Speedway Center - 1st - 9pts
