= Richard Greer =

British motorcycle speedway rider

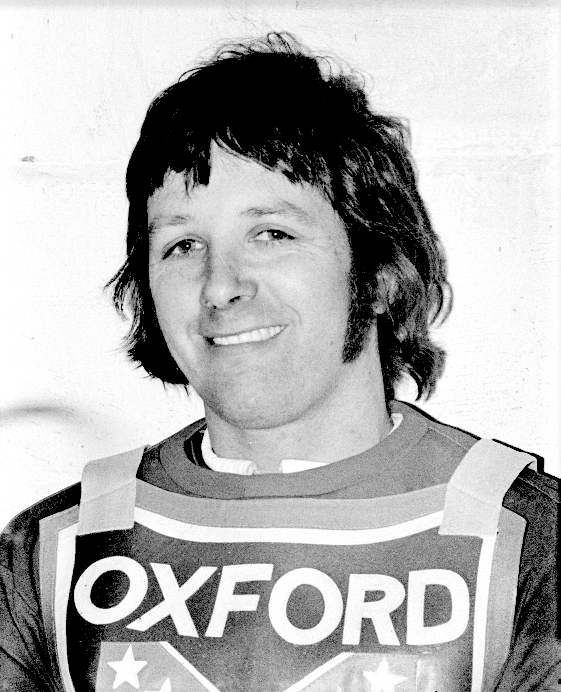
- Born: 29 November 1946 (age 79); Peterborough, England

Current club information
- Career status: Track Curator, Alwalton

Career history
- 1970-1973, 1979-1981: Peterborough Panthers
- 1971: Oxford Cheetahs
- 1973: Reading Racers
- 1974-1975: Oxford Rebels
- 1976: White City Rebels
- 1977-1979: Birmingham Brummies
- 1980-1981: Eastbourne Eagles

Individual honours
- 1974: Oxford Best Pairs (with John Dews)

Team honours
- 1975: Midland Cup winner

Richard Greer is a former motorcycle speedway rider in the 1970s and 1980s.

== Career ==
Greer, who completed seven years in Peterborough Panthers colours was a member of the inaugural team of 1970, and is one of only eight riders that have scored more than 2,000 points for the club in their 51-year history to date.

Greer rode for Peterborough between 1970 and 1973 before moving up to the top sphere of racing with Oxford Rebels, White City Rebels and Birmingham Brummies. He attained heat leader status with all three clubs and was team captain for Peterborough Panthers, White City Rebels and Birmingham Brummies in his time.

Greer's first match with Oxford was on 21 March 1974, where he impressed with 10 points and Oxford beating Ipswich Witches 40-37 in a Knock-Out Cup match. He matched that point performance away to Hull Vikings and another Oxford victory 41-37.Later, in May, with John Dews (speedway rider), he won the Radio Oxford Best Pairs Tournament. In a side affected by injuries, Greer continued to perform, scoring a maximum against Coventry Bees on 27 June.

In 1975, Greer was part of the Midland Cup winning Oxford Rebels, which saw exciting draws against Swindon Robins home and away, requiring reruns, and an amazing away win against Wolverhampton Wolves to clinch the cup. He joined White City Rebels in 1976.

Two serious injuries restricted Greer's career however, and he returned to spearhead the Panthers from 1979 to complete another three seasons for his home town, before retiring at the end of the 1981 season. At retirement, he had earned four international caps for the England national speedway team.

Greer rode in 234 official matches for Peterborough scoring 2,088 points for an impressive career average of 8.39, scoring 35 paid and full maximums along the way, a figure surpassed by only two other Panthers.

When he retired from racing, Greer became a regular at Peterborough and became Clerk of the Course at Alwalton, later also becoming an FIM official at that level, officiating in that position at several British Grand Prix at Cardiff and the World Cup held at Eastbourne. Keeping a connection to speedway, he was the Peterborough Panthers co-promoter in 2021 and was the president of Peterborough Speedway Supporters Club.

== Personal life ==
Greer played ice hockey for 15 years for a veterans team, in countries such as Czech Republic, Canada, Ireland, Holland and Germany.

Greer's wife, Joan, died in 2014; they had been married for 46 years.
