= David Ashby (speedway rider) =

English speedway rider (1949–2015)

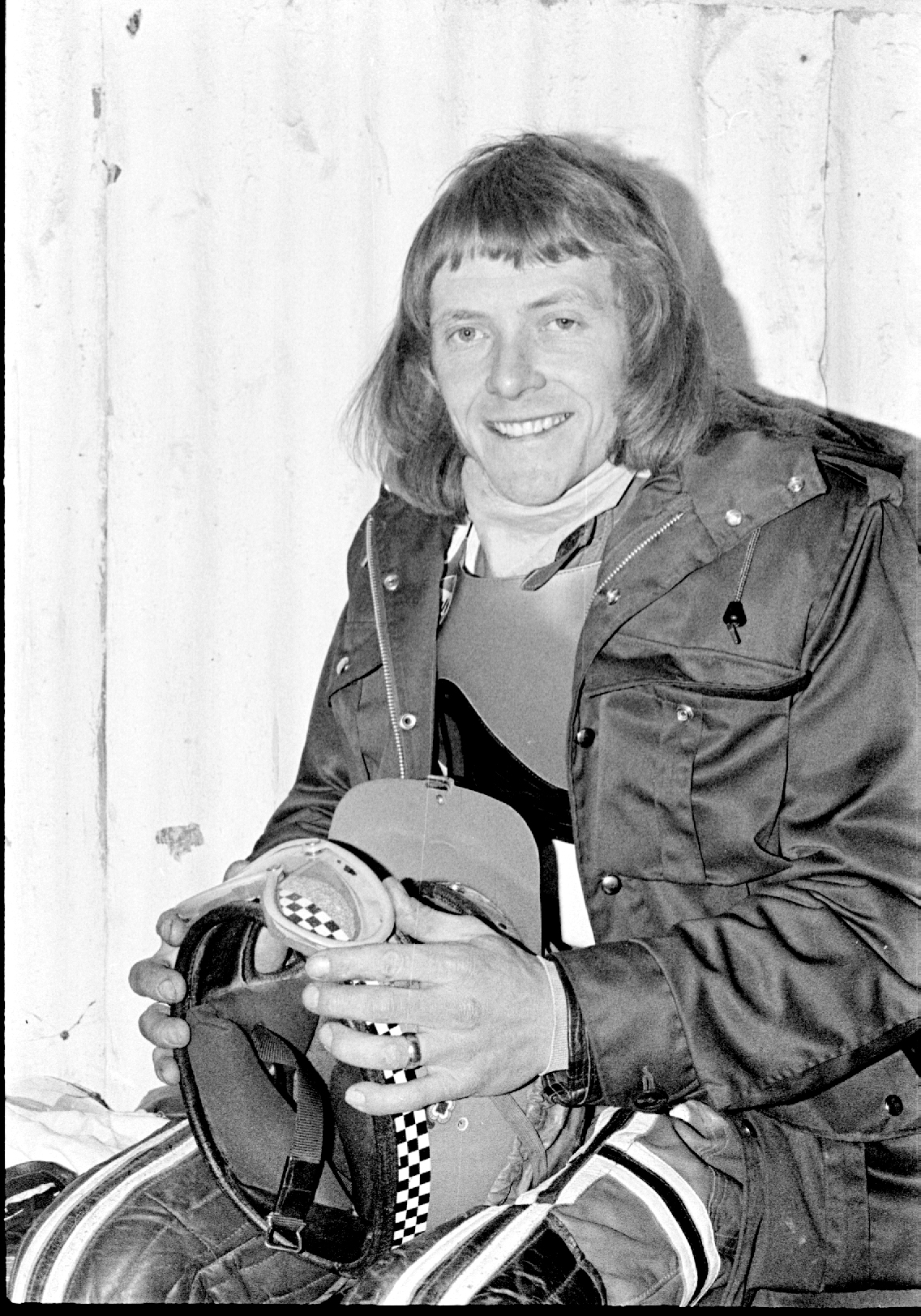
- Born: 11 November 1949; Marlborough, England
- Died: 16 September 2015 (aged 65)
- Nationality: British (English)

Career history
- 1972-1979: Swindon Robins
- 1972, 1980: Peterborough Panthers
- 1979: Milton Keynes Knights

David John Ashby (11 November 1949 – 16 September 2015) was an English motorcycle speedway rider.

== Career ==
Born in Marlborough, England, Ashby rode for Swindon Robins between 1972 and 1978, making 151 appearances, and had spells riding for Peterborough Panthers and Milton Keynes Knights. He retired in 1980.

== Personal life and death ==
Ashby died of cancer on 16 September 2015, aged 65.

His brother, Martin, was also a speedway rider. His two sons, Lee and Jamie, rode motocross with their dad, David, acting as mechanic.
