= Doug Underwood (speedway rider) =

Australian speedway rider (1946–2024)

- Born: 28 May 1946; Perth, Western Australia, Australia
- Died: 14 May 2024 (aged 77); Perth, Western Australia, Australia
- Nationality: Australian

Career history
- 1972: Hull Vikings
- 1972–1974: Scunthorpe Saints
- 1973: Swindon Robins
- 1975: Teesside Tigers
- 1975–1977: Leicester Lions
- 1977–1979: Reading Racers
- 1979: Weymouth Wildcats

Team honours
- 1977: Spring Gold Cup Winner

Douglas Richard Underwood (28 May 1946 – 14 May 2024) was an Australian motorcycle speedway rider.

== Biography ==
Born in Perth, Western Australia, Underwood's early racing experience was in scrambles, finishing runner-up in the 1969 West Australian Scrambles Championship and tenth in the 1970 Australian Scrambles Championship (in the unlimited class). In 1971 he took up speedway, and after riding at Claremont Speedway in 1971–72, rode in the second division in Britain in 1972 for Scunthorpe Saints (now called the Scunthorpe Scorpions).

After averaging over five points per match in his debut season, Underwood improved to over 6.5 in 1974, which together with some impressive performances at Leicester Stadium attracted interest from top flight Leicester Lions, who signed him in 1975. He rode for Leicester in the British League and Teesside Tigers in the National League in 1975. He rode again for Leicester in 1976 but during the 1977 season he transferred to Reading Racers, for whom he rode until 1979. when he transferred to Weymouth Wildcats. He retired at the end of the 1979 season.

Underwood rode internationally for Australia against the British Lions in both 1971–72 and 1974–75. He also rode in the Young Australasia team against England in 1974.

Underwood was a carpenter by trade, and also competed in rifle shooting, representing Western Australia in the Air Cadets Rifle Shooting Championship. As a result of his time shooting he was deaf in one ear.

Underwood later suffered from Parkinson's disease. He died in Perth on 14 May 2024, at the age of 77.
