= Graham Drury =

Welsh motorcycle speedway rider (1952–2024)

- Born: 13 February 1952; Wrexham District, Wales
- Died: 26 January 2024 (aged 71)
- Nationality: British (Welsh)

Career history
- 1971: Rochdale Hornets
- 1972–1974: Ellesmere Port Gunners
- 1974: Halifax Dukes
- 1975: Crewe Kings
- 1975–1981: Hull Vikings
- 1975: Cradley Heathens
- 1975: Exeter Falcons
- 1982–1983: Oxford Cheetahs
- 1984–1985: Long Eaton Invaders

Team honours
- 1984: National League Champion

Malcolm Graham Keith Drury (13 February 1952 – 26 January 2024) was a Welsh international motorcycle speedway rider and team manager. He earned one international cap for the England national speedway team (with no Welsh national team, Welsh riders represented England).

== Biography ==
Drury was born in Wales, joined the Belle Vue training school and was a regional grass track champion before moving into conventional speedway. He began his British leagues career riding for Rochdale Hornets during the 1971 British League Division Two season. The following season he joined Ellesmere Port Gunners, where he would spend the next two seasons progressing to a 9.03 average in 1973 and 9.31 in 1974 His performances in 1974 led to a call up for Halifax Dukes in the highest division (the British League) during the same season.

In 1975, Drury joined Crewe Kings for the 1975 New National League season and topped the team's averages for the season. Another move in 1976, saw him joining the Hull Vikings for his first full season in the top tier. In 1977, he topped the team averages for Hull and was their leading rider and then over the next three seasons was an ever present for the team until the 1980 season.

In 1980, Drury made the decision to race in West Germany, which was unusual because most of the world's riders raced in the British leagues at the time.

Drury returned to Hull for the 1981 season before switching to Oxford Cheetahs in 1982 for the National league season. After two years at Oxford he had a contractual dispute, which later led him to becoming a magistrate in Oswestry. Following the dispute with Oxford who were in the process of moving up a division and changing the face of speedway in terms of spending, he joined Long Eaton where he finished his riding career and started his managerial career.

After retiring as a rider, Drury became involved in several speedway pursuits including promoting ice meetings at Telford and becoming a team manager for several clubs including Long Eaton, Mildenhall Fen Tigers, Workington Comets and Birmingham Brummies. Drury died on 26 January 2024, at the age of 71.
