= Trevor Geer =

English motorcycle speedway rider (born 1953)

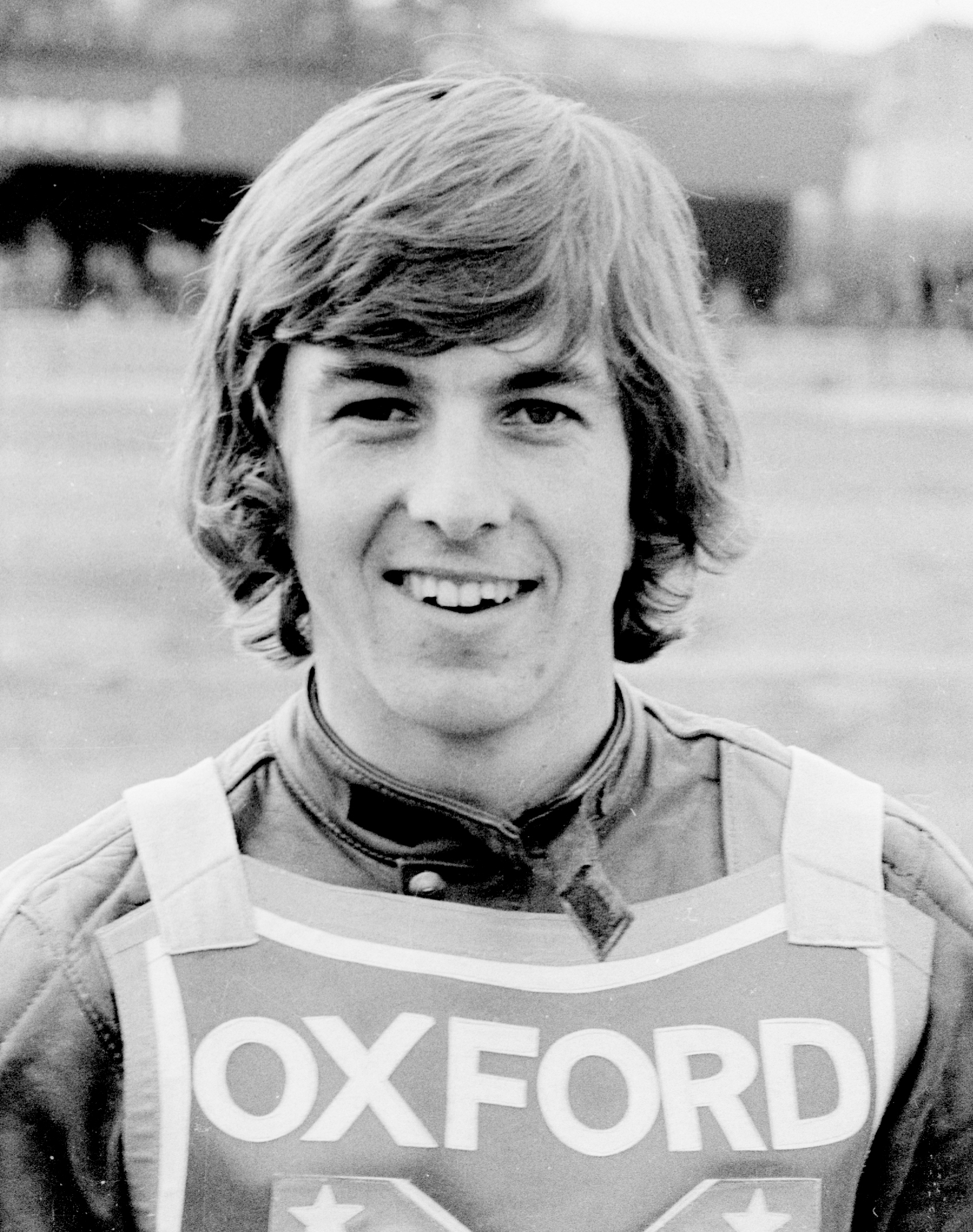
- Born: 24 June 1953 (age 73); Polegate, England
- Nationality: British (English)

Career history
- 1971-1975, 1979-1981, 1983: Eastbourne Eagles
- 1974-1975, 1980: Oxford Rebels/Cheetahs
- 1976-1978: White City Rebels

Team honours
- 1975: Midland Cup winner
- 1977: British League Champion

Trevor Geer is a former motorcycle speedway rider, from England.

== Career ==
Geer began racing in the British leagues for Eastbourne Eagles during the 1971 British League Division Two season. He helped the Eagles win the league title in his debut season despite only appearing four times for the club.

Geer began to double up for the Oxford Cheetahs from 1974. He and Ole Olsen came second in the Radio Oxford Best Pairs in 1974. He started his full-time British League career with Oxford in 1975 and was part of the Midland Cup winning team.

After five years with Eastbourne, Geer transferred to the Oxford Rebels in 1976 but when the city's Cowley Stadium was threatened with closure, Geer and other team members left to form the White City Rebels. In 1979, he returned to race for the Eagles again and completed his last season in 1983 before retiring due to problems with injuries.

After retiring, Geer became the team manager for the Eastbourne Eagles.
