= Steve Weatherley =

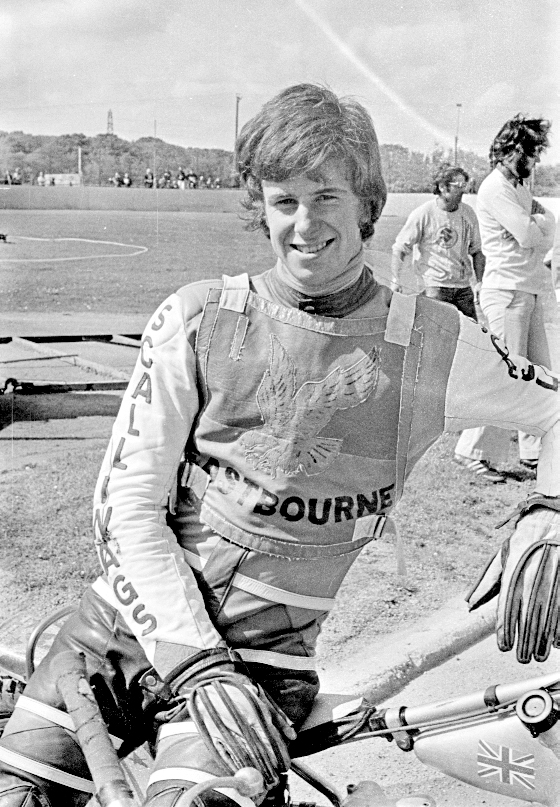
- Born: 26 November 1957 (age 68); Dartford, England
- Nationality: British (English)

Career history
- 1974-1976, 1979: Eastbourne Eagles
- 1974: Wolverhampton Wolves
- 1975: Poole Pirates
- 1975: Cradley United
- 1975: Oxford Rebels
- 1975: Hull Vikings
- 1976-1978: White City Rebels

Team honours
- 1975: New National League KO Cup Winner
- 1977: British League Champion

Stephen John Weatherley (born 26 November 1957) is a former motorcycle speedway rider from England, who was twice runner-up in the British Speedway Under 21 Championship.

== Career ==
Weatherley rode primarily for the Eastbourne Eagles and the White City Rebels, who won the British League in 1977.

On 8 June 1979, Weatherley was paralysed whilst riding for Eastbourne at Hackney Wick Stadium, Waterden Road. He was involved in a terrible crash with Vic Harding. Harding was killed and Weatherley was left with a broken back. He has used a wheelchair since the crash.

== Family ==
Weatherley's nephew, Lee Richardson (1979–2012) was an international speedway rider.
