= Brian Woodward (speedway rider) =

Welsh speedway rider (1952–2022)

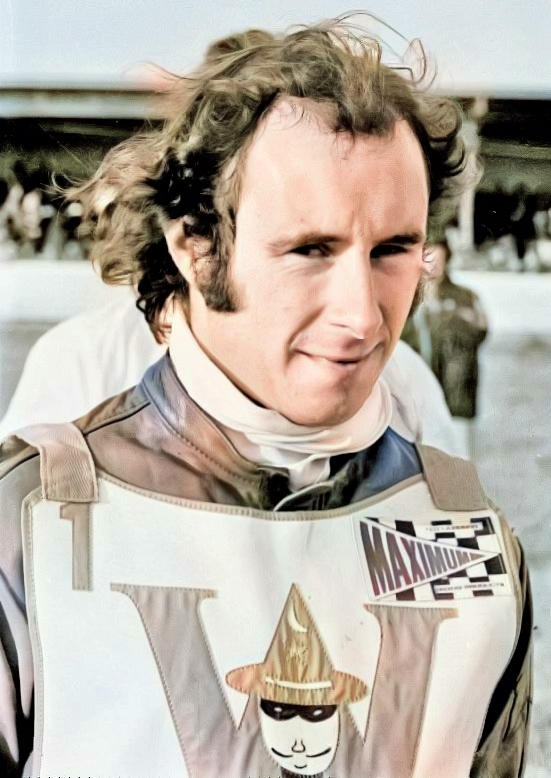
- Born: 9 May 1952; Monmouth, Wales
- Died: 13 November 2022 (aged 70)
- Nationality: British (Welsh)

Career history
- 1972-1976: Newport Wasps
- 1973: Chesterton Potters
- 1974: Stoke Potters
- 1975: Weymouth Wizards
- 1977: Newport Dragons
- 1977: Bristol Bulldogs
- 1978: Wolverhampton Wolves
- 1979: Reading Racers
- 1979-1981: Weymouth Wildcats
- 1980: Birmingham Brummies
- 1982: Oxford Cheetahs

Brian John Woodward (9 May 1952 – 13 November 2022) was a motorcycle speedway rider from Wales, who rode in the National League (speedway) and British League.

== Career ==
Woodward was born on 9 May 1952 in Monmouth, Wales.

Woodward appeared on the front cover of the Speedway Star 25 August 1973 with teammate Mike Broadbank. Although born a Welshman, Woodward rode for Young England against a Young Czechoslovakia team in 1974 in an almost whitewash test series, England winning 5.5 -1.5. He rode in only one test, at Birmingham (Perry Barr).

1975 saw Woodward riding as a Weymouth Wizards under promoter Harry Davis (father of John Davis). In 1977, he signed for Bristol Bulldogs. When he returned in 1979, it was as a Weymouth Wildcats with new promoter Len Silver.

In 1979, in the Sunday Mirror World Championship Qualifying Round at Boston, Woodward picked up 11 points from five rides, finishing fifth. He finished his career at Oxford.

Woodward died on 14 November 2022.
