= Keith White (speedway rider) =

British motorcycle speedway rider

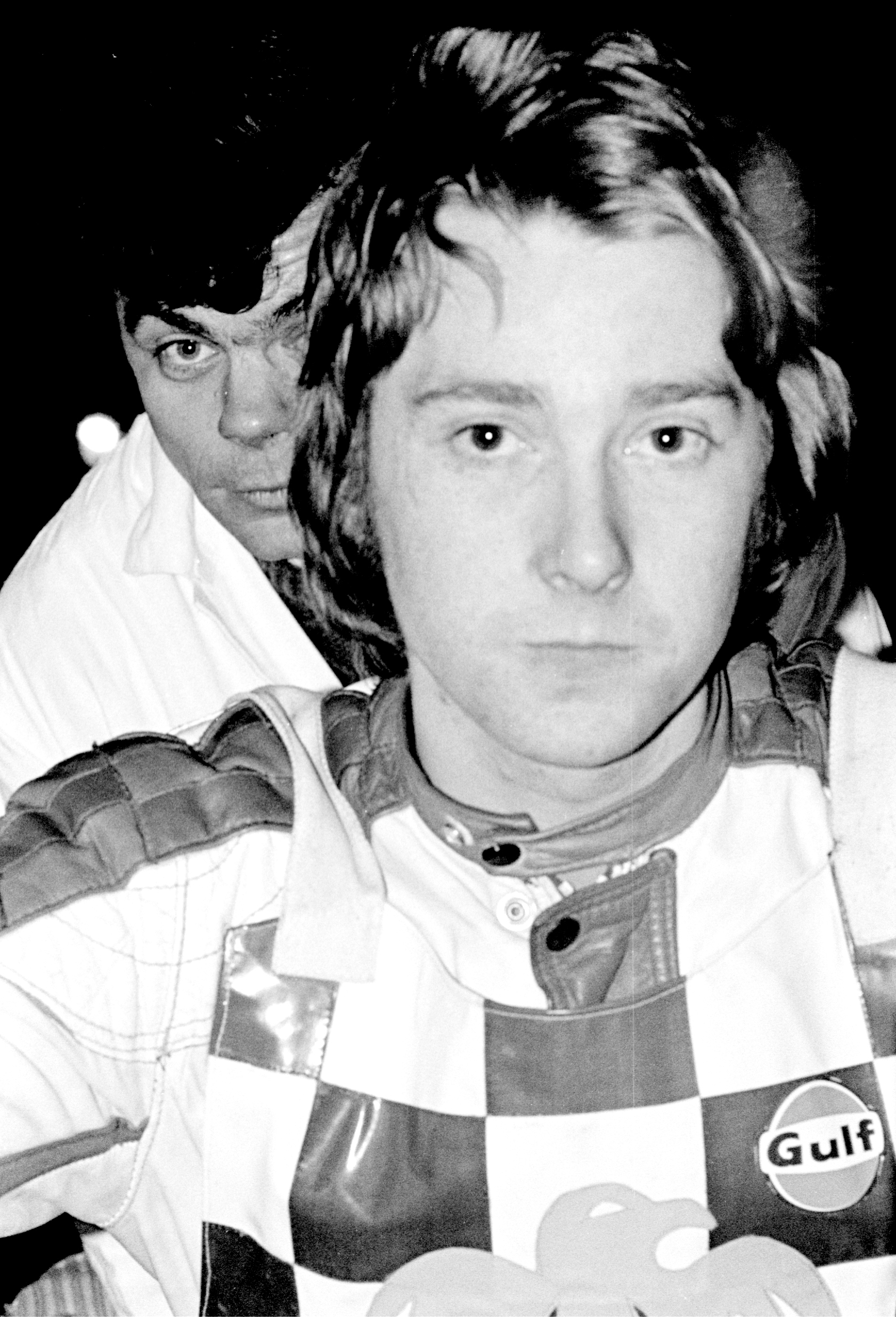
- Born: 27 August 1958 (age 68); Hackney, England
- Nationality: British (English)

Career history
- 1972: Peterborough Panthers
- 1973-1974: Crewe Kings
- 1973-1975: Leicester Lions
- 1974: Poole Pirates
- 1975: Birmingham Brummies
- 1976-1980: Hackney Hawks
- 1981-1984: Coventry Bees
- 1982-1987: Milton Keynes Knights
- 1987-1990: Long Eaton Invaders

Individual honours
- 1978: London Riders' Championship

Team honours
- 1975: New National League Champion
- 1981: British League Cup
- 1981: Midland Cup

Keith White (born 27 August 1958) is a former international speedway rider from England. He earned seven international caps for the England national speedway team.

== Career ==
White first rode for Leicester but started his league career with the Peterborough Panthers in the National League. White showed promise whilst at the Crewe Kings and his form prompted the Leicester Lions to call on his services in the British League. He was then signed on a full contract by the Hackney Hawks to ride full-time in the top flight in 1976.

After four seasons with Hackney, in the last of which he won the London Riders' Championship, White moved on to the Coventry Bees as well as riding for the Milton Keynes Knights in the National League. He retired in 1990 after a poor start to the season (due to injuries) with the Long Eaton Invaders.

== Family ==
His father Vic White rode and was often Keith's team manager throughout his career.
